= 1985 Australian Football Championships =

Australian football tournament

Tournament information
- Sport: Australian football
- Location: Adelaide and Perth, Australia
- Dates: 14 May 1985–16 July 1985
- Format: Round Robin
- Teams: 3

Final champion
- South Australia

The 1985 Australian Football Championships was an Australian rules football series between representative teams of the three major football states. Games involving Victoria were played under State of Origin rules, whilst the match between Western Australia and South Australia involved players based in their respective states at the time. The competition drew controversy when the result of the game between Victoria and South Australia, originally a 57 point win to Victoria, was overturned and awarded to South Australia as a result of Victoria fielding too many players when coach Kevin Sheedy snuck Shane Heard into the squad and into the team as an extra player. The competition was won by South Australia, and it was their first Australian championship since 1911.

== Results ==
=== Game 1 ===
Home team	Home team score	Away team	Away team score	Ground	Crowd	Date	Time	Broadcast Network
South Australia	11.10 (76)	Victoria	20.13 (133)	Football Park	44,287	14 May 1985	8:00pm	Seven

- Match awarded to South Australia at a National Football League appeal hearing on 16 June 1985. Victoria forfeited the match but retained the percentage in relation to points scored for and against.
- Fos Williams Medal: Peter Motley (South Australia)

=== Game 2 ===
Home team	Home team score	Away team	Away team score	Ground	Crowd	Date	Time	Broadcast Network
South Australia	30.18 (198)	Western Australia	16.15 (111)	Subiaco Oval		15 June 1985		

- Fos Williams Medal: Craig Bradley (South Australia)
- Simpson Medal: Craig Bradley (South Australia)

=== Game 3 ===
Home team	Home team score	Away team	Away team score	Ground	Crowd	Date	Time	Broadcast Network
Victoria	19.16 (130)	Western Australia	9.11 (65)	Subiaco Oval	38,000	16 July 1985		

- Simpson Medal: Dale Weightman (Victoria)
- E. J. Whitten Medal: Paul Roos (Victoria)
- Tassie Medal: Dale Weightman (Victoria)

== Standings ==
1985 Australian Championship
Pos	Team	Pld	W	L	D	PF	PA	PP	Pts
1	South Australia	2	2	0	0	274	244	112.3	4
2	Victoria	2	1	1	0	263	141	186.5	2
3	Western Australia	2	0	2	0	176	328	53.7	0

== All-Australian Team ==
Following completion of the series, the best players over the three games were selected in the All-Australian team.

1985 All-Australian team
B:	Garry Foulds (Vic)	Gary Pert (Vic)	Terry Daniher (Vic)
HB:	Rod Lester-Smith (WA)	Paul Roos (Vic)	Peter Motley (SA)
C:	Craig Bradley (SA)	Geoff Raines (Vic)	Gary Buckenara (WA)
HF:	Dermott Brereton (Vic)	Stephen Kernahan (SA)	Mark Harvey (Vic)
F:	Leon Baker (WA)	Roger Merrett (Vic)	John Platten (SA)
Foll:	Mark Lee (Vic)	Russell Greene (Vic)	Dale Weightman (Vic)
Int:	Malcolm Blight (SA)	Michael Mitchell (WA)	
Coach:	Kevin Sheedy (Vic)		

== Squads ==
South Australia

Coach/es: Neil Balme
Captain/s: Malcolm Blight
Vice Captain/s:
Deputy Vice Captain/s:
Both Games

- Michael Aish (Norwood)
- Craig Bradley (Carlton)
- Matthew Campbell (North Adelaide)
- Stephen Kernahan (Glenelg)
- Garry McIntosh (Norwood)
- Peter Motley (Carlton)
- John Platten (Centrals)
- Michael Redden (North Adelaide)
- Keith Thomas (Norwood)

vs Victoria

- Greg Anderson (Port Adelaide)
- Tony Antrobus (North Adelaide)
- Michael Bennett (South Adelaide)
- Stephen Connelly (Central District)
- Johnston
- Martin Leslie (Port Adelaide)
- Greg Phillips (Port Adelaide)
- Neville Roberts (Norwood)
- Dwayne Russell (Port Adelaide)
- Paul Weston (Essendon)
- Robin White (Melbourne)

vs Western Australia

- Malcolm Blight (Woodville)
- Greg Anderson (Port Adelaide)
- Peter Bubner (Central District)
- Richard Cousins (Central District)
- Rohan Helyar (Norwood)
- Andrew Jarman (North Adelaide)
- Bruce Lindsay (West Torrens)
- Chris McDermott (Glenelg)
- Mark Naley (South Adelaide)
- John Schneebichler (South Adelaide)
- Tom Warhurst (Norwood)
- Greg Whittlesea (Sturt)
Victoria

Coach: Kevin Sheedy
Both Games

- Dermott Brereton (Hawthorn)
- Russell Greene (Hawthorn)
- Roger Merrett (Essendon)
- Richard Osborne (Fitzroy)
- Dale Weightman (Richmond)

vs South Australia

- Gary Ablett (Geelong)
- Shane Heard (Essendon)
- Gerard Healy (Sydney)
- Mark Lee (Richmond)
- Darren Williams (Essendon)
- Paul Van Der Haar (Essendon)
- Mark Yeates (Geelong)

vs Western Australia

- Tom Alvin (Carlton)
- Ricky Barham (Collingwood)
- Andrew Bews (Geelong)
- Alan Ezard (Essendon)
- Garry Foulds (Essendon)
- Mark Harvey (Essendon)
- Tony Lockett (St Kilda)
- Simon Madden (Essendon)
- Merv Neagle (Sydney)
- Gary Pert (Fitzroy)
- Geoff Rainesc
- Paul Roos (Fitzroy)
- Brian Royal (Footscray)
- Bernard Toohey (Geelong)
- Stephen Wallis (Footscray)
- Kevin Walsh (Essendon)
- Tim Watson (Essendon)

Other Squad Members

- David Ackerly (Sydney)
- Mark Bos (Geelong)
- Rod Carter (Sydney)
- Terry Daniher (Essendon)
- Bernie Evans (Carlton)
- Glenn Hawker (Essendon)
- Doug Hawkins (Footscray)
- Gerard Healy (Melbourne)
- Chris Mew (Hawthorn)
- Brian Taylor (Collingwood)
- Brian Wilson (Melbourne)
Western Australia

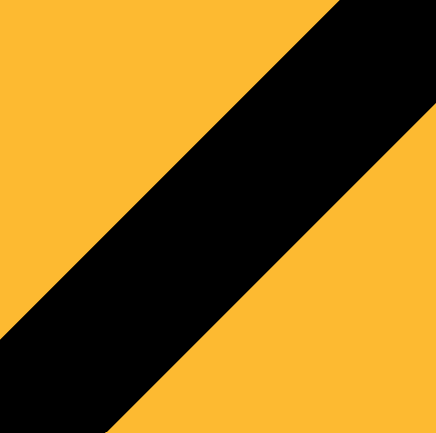

Coach/es: John Todd
Captain/s: Don Langsford, Ross Glendinning
Vice Captain/s:
Deputy Vice Captain/s:
Both Games

- Clinton Browning (East Fremantle)
- Michael Mitchell (Claremont)
- Garry Sidebottom (Swan Districts)

vs South Australia

- Don Langsford (Swan Districts)
- Mark Bairstow (South Fremantle)
- Phil Bradmore (West Perth)
- Michael Brennan (East Fremantle)
- Gavin Carter (South Fremantle)
- Kevin Caton (Swan Districts)
- Bryan Cousins(Perth)
- Jon Fogarty (Swan Districts)
- Paul Harding (East Fremantle)
- Dwayne Lamb (Subiaco)
- Murray Rance (Swan Districts)
- Stephen Richardson (Swan Districts)
- Phil Scott (Subiaco)
- Bill Skwirowski (Swan Districts)
- Colin Waterson (East Fremantle)
- Greg Wilkinson (Subiaco)
- Peter Wilson (East Fremantle)
- Murray Wrensted (East Fremantle)

vs Victoria

- John Annear (Claremont)
- Leon Baker (Swan Districts)
- Simon Beasley (Swan Districts)
- Wayne Blackwell (Claremont)
- Gary Buckenara (Subiaco)
- Allen Daniels (Footscray)
- Ross Glendinning (East Perth)
- Brad Hardie (Footscray)
- Craig Holden (Swan Districts)
- Ken Hunter (Carlton)
- Jim Krakouer (North Melbourne)
- Rod Lester-Smith (Hawthorn)
- Brian Peake (East Fremantle)
- Andrew Purser (Footscray)
- Mike Richardson (Collingwood)
- Maurice Rioli (Richmond)
- Jim Sewell (Footscray)
- Allan Sidebottom (Swan Districts)
- Robert Wiley (Perth)
