= 1984 VFL grand final =

Grand final of the 1984 Victorian Football League season

1984 VFL Grand Final

Hawthorn	Essendon
12.9 (81)	14.21 (105)
	1	2	3	4
HAW	6.1 (37)	8.6 (54)	10.8 (68)	12.9 (81)
ESS	2.4 (16)	3.11 (29)	5.15 (45)	14.21 (105)
- Date: 29 September 1984
- Stadium: Melbourne Cricket Ground, Melbourne, Australia
- Attendance: 92,685

Broadcast in Australia
- Network: Seven Network
- Commentators: Peter Landy, Lou Richards, Bob Skilton

The 1984 VFL Grand Final was an Australian rules football game contested between the Essendon Football Club and Hawthorn Football Club, held at the Melbourne Cricket Ground in Melbourne on 29 September 1984. It was the 88th annual grand final of the Victorian Football League, staged to determine the premiers for the 1984 VFL season. The match, attended by 92,685 spectators, was won by Essendon by a margin of 24 points, marking that club's 13th premiership victory.

== Background ==
It was a grand final rematch of the previous season's grand final in which Hawthorn defeated Essendon by a then record 83 points.

Essendon topped the home and away season ladder a game clear of their grand final opponents; however, Hawthorn won both home and away contests between the two teams. Despite having won 12 premierships, Essendon's most recent premiership had been in 1965 over St Kilda, who were coached by current Hawthorn coach Allan Jeans.

In the finals series, the Hawks defeated Carlton by 30 points in the qualifying final, and beat the Bombers by eight points in the second semi-final to advance to the grand final. Essendon then faced Collingwood in the preliminary final, demolishing the Magpies by a record 133 points on the back of a 28-goal performance to advance to the grand final.

== Match summary ==
=== First quarter ===
Hawthorn dominated the game early. Captain Leigh Matthews had the first goal on the scoreboard within thirty seconds of the opening bounce, and Colin Robertson, utilising his pace, added two more. Essendon had hoped to throw Hawthorn off balance early by playing Roger Merrett in the ruck and shifting Simon Madden, by now one of the finest ruckmen in the VFL, to full-forward. Hawthorn countered his by putting Ian Paton in the ruck and moving Michael Byrne to full-forward. Madden consequently languished in Essendon's forward line doing nothing while the ball was spending more time at the other end of the ground. Sheedy soon moved Madden back to the ruck, but at quarter time Hawthorn led by 21.

=== Second quarter ===
Goals to Ken Judge and Matthews saw Hawthorn increase their lead to 32 points. Essendon, despite getting more possession, made little impact in front of goals, but when the Bombers kicked their third for the match, by Billy Duckworth, they remained in touch and trailed by 25 points at the half-time break.

=== Third quarter ===
The third quarter was a low-scoring affair, more notable for the changes to field positions that Essendon coach Kevin Sheedy applied in an attempt to stem the flow of Hawthorn goals. While common today, at the time it was very unusual for a coach to make such radical changes as shifting backline players to the forward line and vice versa. Paul Weston was shifted from defence to centre half-forward, captain Terry Daniher was moved to defence, while another defender, Peter Bradbury, was moved to half-forward. With these positional changes, Essendon managed to get within three goals of the lead, but Dermott Brereton kicked a late goal for Hawthorn to give them a 23-point lead going into the final term.

=== Fourth quarter ===
Essendon got off to the perfect start in the final quarter. Madden, who had been ordinary for much of the game, won the opening bounce. The ball fell to Williams, who kicked the ball forward, where Baker was in the perfect position to run onto the spilled ball from a marking contest and kick his third goal of the match. Minutes later, Bradbury kicked a goal from the back of a pack. Essendon's charge continued when the ball made its way to Duckworth at half forward who passed it to an unmanned Mark Thompson who put it through from 40 metres out directly in front. The Bombers hit the front in spectacular fashion when, from the resultant centre bounce, Williams kicked towards the right half-forward flank. The ball bounced favourably for Baker, who evaded Hawks defender David O'Halloran with a brilliant blind turn and booted his fourth goal, to the delight of Essendon fans.

Hawthorn was back in front when Peter Curran goaled from a 15-metre penalty but Essendon soon regained their advantage when Roger Merrett took a pack mark in the goal square before converting. Weston extended Essendon's lead to 11 points minutes later and then Tim Watson goaled twice to seal the comeback win for Essendon. The Bombers kicked 9.6 in the final term to break free from the Hawks. It would not be until 2009 that another team would win the grand final from a three-quarter time deficit. The 23-point three quarter time deficit is the largest ever overcome to achieve victory in a Grand Final in VFL/AFL history. (North Melbourne overcame a 27-point three quarter time deficit to draw the 1977 VFL Grand Final).

The Norm Smith Medal was awarded to Duckworth for being judged the best player afield. Watson, Baker, Mark Harvey, Shane Heard and Neil Clarke were also prominent for the Bombers, while Richard Loveridge, Gary Ayres, Peter Schwab, Terry Wallace and Chris Mew were the best for Hawthorn.

Essendon's win ended an 18-year streak during which only Hawthorn, Richmond, Carlton and North Melbourne had won the premiership.

The attendance of 92,685 was the smallest at an MCG grand final for 29 years. The match was the first grand final played in the aftermath of the off-field dispute between the League, which wanted to stage the grand final at VFL Park, and the Melbourne Cricket Club and the Cain state government, which wanted to stage the grand final at the MCG. Under the terms agreed to in early 1984, an area in the Members' and Olympic Stands was set aside for 44,000 MCC and VFL Park members, but only 31,000 attended, leaving a large vacant area at the top of the Olympic Stand. Uncertainty about the new arrangements, accusations that the demand for members tickets had been overestimated, and breezy and cool conditions in the wake of a heavy overnight hailstorm were all considered to have discouraged many spectators from attending.

Ten players from this game later went on to become senior VFL/AFL coaches.

== Teams ==
Hawthorn	Essendon

Hawthorn
B:	7 Gary Ayres	8 David O'Halloran	32 Colin Robertson
HB:	6 Rod Lester-Smith	2 Chris Mew	30 Peter Schwab
C:	9 Robert DiPierdomenico	16 Terry Wallace	4 Peter Russo
HF:	1 Ken Judge	23 Dermott Brereton	25 Peter Curran
F:	20 Michael McCarthy	3 Leigh Matthews (c)	22 Richard Loveridge
Foll:	21 Michael Byrne	17 Michael Tuck	29 Russell Greene
Int:	12 Ian Paton	26 Rodney Eade	
Coach:	Allan Jeans		

Essendon
B:	10 Garry Foulds	22 Billy Duckworth	28 Paul Weston
HB:	36 Peter Bradbury	30 Kevin Walsh	33 Glenn Hawker
C:	1 Merv Neagle	4 Leon Baker	9 Shane Heard
HF:	32 Tim Watson	5 Terry Daniher (c)	18 Paul Van Der Haar
F:	15 Alan Ezard	27 Simon Madden	7 Frank Dunell
Foll:	25 Roger Merrett	8 Neil Clarke	13 Darren Williams
Int:	38 Mark Harvey	26 Mark Thompson	
Coach:	Kevin Sheedy		

== Scorecard ==
1984 VFL Grand Final
Saturday, 29 September 2:30pm	Hawthorn	def. by	Essendon	MCG (crowd: 92,685)
6.1 (37); 8.6 (54); 10.8 (68); 12.9 (81)	Q1; Q2; Q3; Final	2.4 (16); 3.11 (29); 5.15 (45); 14.21 (105)	Umpires: James, Sawers; Norm Smith Medal: Billy Duckworth; Television broadcast: Seven Network; National anthem: Slim Dusty
Matthews 4 Brereton, Robertson 2 Curran, Judge, Loveridge, Tuck 1	Goals	4 Baker; 2 Duckworth, Watson; 1 Daniher, Bradbury, Thompson, Merrett, Weston, Neagle
Schwab, Loveridge, Ayres, Mew, Wallace, Matthews	Best	Duckworth, Watson, Harvey, Hawker, Baker, Clarke, Weston, Heard

=== Statistics ===
Hawthorn	81–105	Essendon
(12.9)		(14.21)

Position	Player	Disps	Goals
Back	Gary Ayres	17	
Back	David O'Halloran	9	
Back	Colin Robertson	12	2
Half-back	Rod Lester-Smith	13	
Half-back	Chris Mew	13	
Half-back	Peter Schwab	15	
Centre	Robert DiPierdomenico	13	
Centre	Terry Wallace	26	
Centre	Peter Russo	18	
Half-forward	Ken Judge	13	1
Half-forward	Dermott Brereton	14	2
Half-forward	Peter Curran	3	1
Forward	Michael McCarthy	7	
Forward	Leigh Matthews (c)	16	4
Forward	Richard Loveridge	22	1
Ruck	Michael Byrne	10	
Ruck-rover	Michael Tuck	8	1
Rover	Russell Greene	22	
Interchange
Interchange	Ian Paton	13	
Interchange	Rodney Eade	8	
Coach:
Allan Jeans

Position	Player	Disps	Goals
Back	Garry Foulds	16	
Back	Billy Duckworth	19	2
Back	Paul Weston	18	1
Half-back	Peter Bradbury	13	1
Half-back	Kevin Walsh	6	
Half-back	Glenn Hawker	19	
Centre	Merv Neagle	21	1
Centre	Leon Baker	20	4
Centre	Shane Heard	23	
Half-forward	Tim Watson	22	2
Half-forward	Terry Daniher (c)	18	1
Half-forward	Paul Vander Haar	7	
Forward	Alan Ezard	13	
Forward	Simon Madden	11	
Forward	Frank Dunell	11	
Ruck	Roger Merrett	18	1
Ruck-rover	Neil Clarke	18	
Rover	Darren Williams	23	
Interchange:
Interchange	Mark Harvey	20	
Interchange	Mark Thompson	11	1
Coach:
Kevin Sheedy

NOTE: Disps = Total disposals (kicks + handpasses)

== See also ==
- 1984 VFL season

== Bibliography ==
- Main, Jim (2001). More than a century of AFL Grand Finals. Pennon Publishing. ISBN 1-877029-00-9.
- Atkinson, Graeme; Atkinson, Brant (2009). The Complete Book of AFL Finals. Scoresby: The Five Mile Press. ISBN 978-1-74211-275-6.
- Ross, Jim, ed. (1996). 100 Years of Australian Football 1897–1996: The Complete Story of the AFL, All the Big Stories, All the Great Pictures, All the Champions, Every AFL Season Reported. Ringwood: Viking. ISBN 0-670-86814-0.
