= 1985 VFL grand final =

Grand final of the 1985 Victorian Football League season

1985 VFL Grand Final

Essendon	Hawthorn
26.14 (170)	14.8 (92)
	1	2	3	4
ESS	6.4 (40)	11.9 (75)	15.11 (101)	26.14 (170)
HAW	5.1 (31)	9.3 (57)	11.5 (71)	14.8 (92)
- Date: 28 September 1985
- Stadium: Melbourne Cricket Ground
- Attendance: 100,042
- Favourite: Essendon
- Umpires: Cameron & Robinson

Accolades
- Norm Smith Medallist: Simon Madden (Essendon)
- Jock McHale Medallist: Kevin Sheedy

Broadcast in Australia
- Network: Seven Network
- Commentators: Peter Landy; Lou Richards; Bob Skilton

The 1985 VFL Grand Final was an Australian rules football game contested between the Essendon Football Club and Hawthorn Football Club, held at the Melbourne Cricket Ground in Melbourne on 28 September 1985. It was the 89th annual grand final of the Victorian Football League, staged to determine the premiers for the 1985 VFL season. The match, attended by 100,042 spectators, was won by Essendon by a margin of 78 points, marking that club's 14th premiership victory.

== Background ==
It was the third consecutive year in which the two clubs met in the premiership decider, with Hawthorn having won the 1983 VFL Grand Final and Essendon having won the 1984 VFL Grand Final

At the conclusion of the home and away season, Essendon had finished first on the VFL ladder with 19 wins and 3 losses. Hawthorn had finished third (behind Footscray) with 15 wins, 6 losses and a draw.

In the finals series in the lead-up to the game, Hawthorn defeated Footscray in the Qualifying Final before meeting the Bombers in the second semi-final, which Essendon convincingly won by 40 points. The Hawks then met Footscray again in the preliminary final, which they won by 10 points to advance to the grand final. The Bombers advanced straight to the grand final on the back of their second semi-final win.

== Teams ==
Hawthorn defender Peter Schwab was available to take his place in the Hawthorn lineup after he was cleared by the VFL Tribunal after he was reported for allegedly willfully wasting time in the club's preliminary final win against Footscray.

Essendon	Hawthorn

Essendon
B:	26 Mark Thompson	28 Paul Weston	22 Billy Duckworth
HB:	10 Garry Foulds	30 Kevin Walsh	33 Glenn Hawker
C:	2 Bryan Wood	32 Tim Watson	8 Neil Clarke
HF:	5 Terry Daniher (c)	25 Roger Merrett	38 Mark Harvey
F:	4 Leon Baker	3 Paul Salmon	18 Paul Van Der Haar
Foll:	27 Simon Madden	13 Darren Williams	14 Tony Elshaug
Int:	17 Stephen Carey	15 Alan Ezard	
Coach:	Kevin Sheedy		

Hawthorn
B:	7 Gary Ayres	2 Chris Mew	30 Peter Schwab
HB:	15 Russell Morris	6 Rod Lester-Smith	29 Russell Greene
C:	9 Robert DiPierdomenico	16 Terry Wallace	4 Peter Russo
HF:	34 John Kennedy	23 Dermott Brereton	1 Ken Judge
F:	20 Michael McCarthy	19 Jason Dunstall	3 Leigh Matthews (c)
Foll:	28 Chris Langford	37 Robert Handley	22 Richard Loveridge
Int:	17 Michael Tuck	8 David O'Halloran	
Coach:	Allan Jeans		

== Match summary ==
The grand final is often remembered for a wild bench-clearing brawl which broke out on the wing soon after the opening bounce.

Essendon edged ahead early and increased its margin slightly at each of the changes, leading by nine points at quarter time, 18 points at half time and 30 points at three quarter time. The Bombers then scored a record 11.3 (69) in the final quarter to completely blow the game open. Paul Salmon kicked six goals for Essendon and Roger Merrett five.

Forward Dermott Brereton starred for the Hawks with eight goals, the most ever in a losing grand final side (a record that stood until Gary Ablett's current record of nine goals in Geelong's losing 1989 VFL Grand Final against Hawthorn). Brereton was also reported three times in the game — he later received a three match suspension for striking arising from the first quarter brawl.

The Norm Smith Medal was awarded to Essendon's Simon Madden for being judged the best player afield.

At the conclusion of the game, the 332nd and final game of Hawks great Leigh Matthews' 16-year career, Matthews then wiping away tears was chaired off the ground by his teammates.

Essendon coach Kevin Sheedy said after the game to his players "It took you five years to play four quarters of football, but I'm patient. It was a wonderful effort of football, the way football should be played."

Hawthorn would play in five of the next six grand finals, including winning the 1986 VFL Grand Final, while Essendon would have to wait until the 1993 AFL Grand Final before their next premiership success.

=== Scoreboard ===
1985 VFL Grand Final
Saturday, 28 September (14:30 (UTC+10))	Essendon	def.	Hawthorn	MCG, Melbourne (crowd: 100,042)	Report
6.4 (40); 11.9 (75); 15.11 (101); 26.14 (170)	Q1; Q2; Q3; Final	5.1 (31); 9.3 (57); 11.5 (71); 14.8 (92)	Umpires: P Cameron & I Robinson; Norm Smith Medal: Simon Madden (Essendon); Television broadcast: Seven Network
Salmon 6, Merrett 5, Harvey 4, Watson 3, Baker 2, Ezard 2, Williams 2, Duckworth, Thompson	Goals	Brereton 8, DiPierdomenico, Judge, Lester-Smith, Loveridge, Matthews, McCarthy
Madden, Salmon, Baker, Thompson, Clarke	Best	Brereton, O'Halloran, Morris, Lester-Smith, Wallace
Hawker (striking)	Reports	Brereton (rough conduct; striking (twice))
Dermott Brereton's eight goals set a new VFL Grand Final record, which stood until 1989.; The match was the final played by Hawthorn's Leigh Matthews who retired following 332 matches for the club.

== Tribunal ==
- Brereton (Hawthorn) by field umpire Robinson for unduly rough play against Van Der Haar (Essendon) in the first quarter. Charge not sustained.
- Brereton (Hawthorn) by goal umpire Andrews for allegedly striking Daniher (Essendon) in the first quarter. Brereton was suspended for three matches.
- Brereton (Hawthorn) by field umpire Robinson and boundary umpire Sporton for allegedly striking Harvey (Essendon) in the final quarter. Charge not sustained.
- Hawker (Essendon) by boundary umpire Sporton for allegedly striking DiPierdomenico in the first quarter. Charge not sustained.

== See also ==
- 1985 VFL season

== Bibliography ==
- The Official statistical history of the AFL 2004
- Ross, J. (ed), 100 Years of Australian Football 1897–1996: The Complete Story of the AFL, All the Big Stories, All the Great Pictures, All the Champions, Every AFL Season Reported, Viking, (Ringwood), 1996. ISBN 0-670-86814-0
