= Tom Alvin =

Australian rules footballer

Personal information
- Born: 21 April 1962 (age 64)
- Height: 183 cm (6 ft 0 in)
- Weight: 81 kg (179 lb)

Playing career
Years	Club	Games (Goals)
1984-1994	Carlton	218 (95)

Career highlights
- VFL Premiership player: 1987; Carlton Hall of Fame inductee 1999

Tom Alvin (born 21 April 1962) is a former Australian rules footballer who played for the Carlton Football Club in the Australian Football League (AFL).

Recruited from Bairnsdale in the Latrobe Valley Football League, Alvin was easily identifiable on the field with his flowing black hair and determined, aggressive style of play, becoming a cult figure during his time with the Blues.

== AFL career ==
Due to Bairnsdale being in Footscray's recruiting zone, Alvin was chased by the Bulldogs but ended up at Carlton. He was among a host of Carlton players making their senior Victorian Football League (VFL) debut in round 1 of the 1984 VFL season against North Melbourne at Waverley Park. Other players making their debut alongside Alvin included Wayne Blackwell, Warren Ralph, David Honybun and Fraser Murphy. In his second season, he was named in the Victorian squad for the state of origin game against South Australia, before making his debut for Victoria against Western Australia.

Alvin started his career at the Blues as a defensive half-back flanker, however when Robert Walls replaced David Parkin as coach at the start of the 1986 season, Alvin was promoted into a midfield role. Alvin had one of his best seasons in the AFL, with the Blues making it to the Grand Final (losing to Hawthorn by 42 points) and being selected to play State of Origin for Victoria.

In 1987 Carlton had an outstanding season, losing only four matches by a combined total of 56 points. Carlton finished the season one game clear of second placed Hawthorn, thereby earning a week's rest before the second semi-final. After a tight struggle, the Blues beat the Hawks in the second semi-final to move straight into the Grand Final.

After a tight, bruising first quarter, Carlton ran away with the game, eventually winning by 33 points. Alvin was one of the best Blues afield, completely outclassing Hawthorn champion Gary Buckenara.

Alvin played with the Blues until the end of the 1994 season, when he retired after 218 games. He stayed in the game for a couple of years, captain-coaching Sandringham in the Victorian Football Association (VFA) in 1995 and 1996.

In 1999 Alvin was inducted into the Carlton Football Club Hall of Fame in recognition of his achievements with the club.
