= List of athletes who came out of retirement =

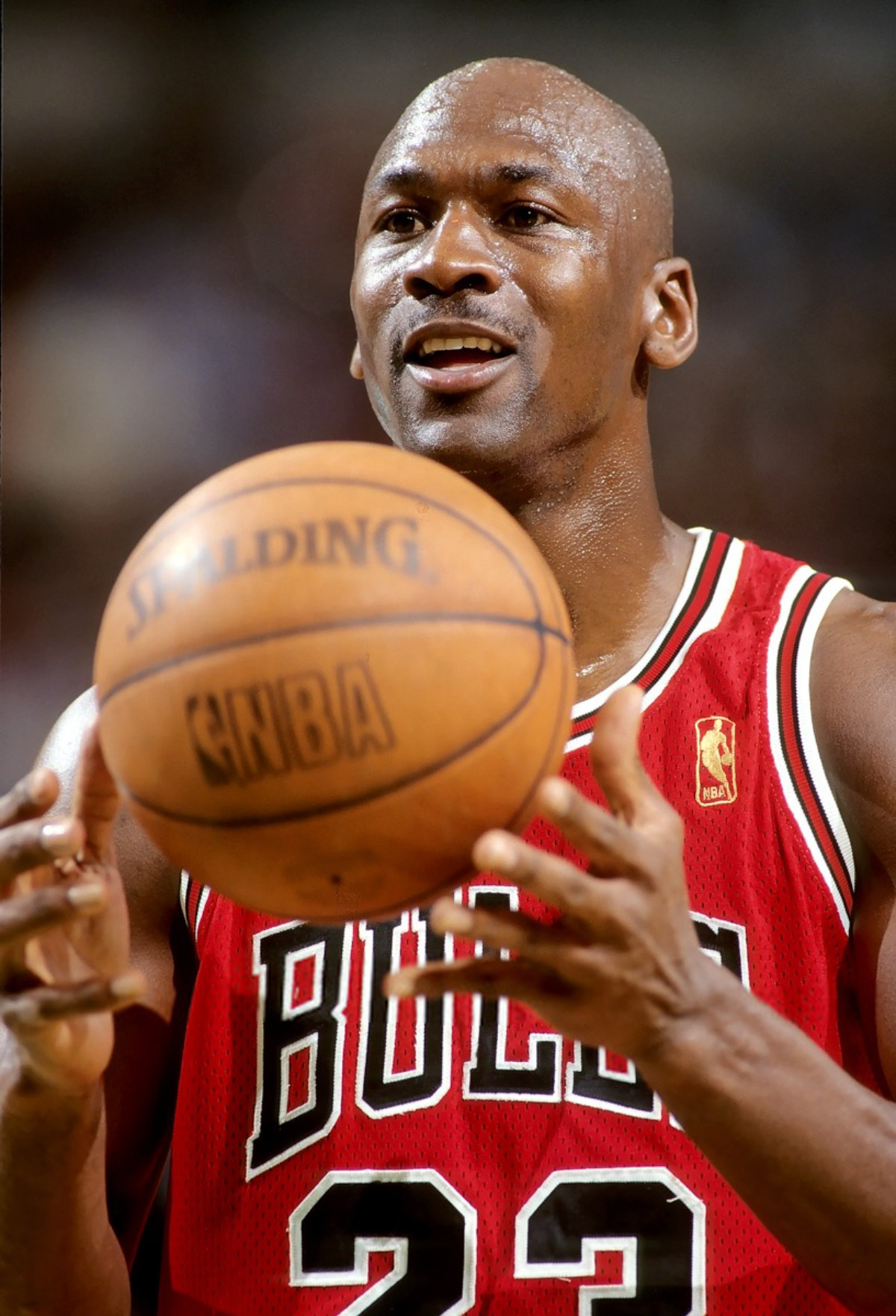
Michael Jordan in 1997 playing in the National Basketball Association after returning from a retirement of nearly two years; during that post-retirement stint, he led the Chicago Bulls to three NBA championships in three seasons.

In most cases, when a professional athlete announces retirement, he or she retires and then never returns to playing professional sports; however, in rare instances there are some athletes who came out of retirement. The following list shows such athletes in addition to any noteworthy achievements that they earned during their playing career after returning from retirement. It includes only professional athletes who announced retirement, were retired for at least one full season or year, and then returned to play their sport in at least one regular season contest. The list does not include players who sat out at least one full season due to injury and then returned to play without having ever officially announced retirement, nor does it include players whose careers were interrupted because of military service or incarceration. It also excludes free agents who were unable to find a team for at least a season and signed with a team at a later point without having ever officially announced retirement. Also excluded are those who continued their careers in senior tours as is the case in tennis, snooker and golf.

== American football ==
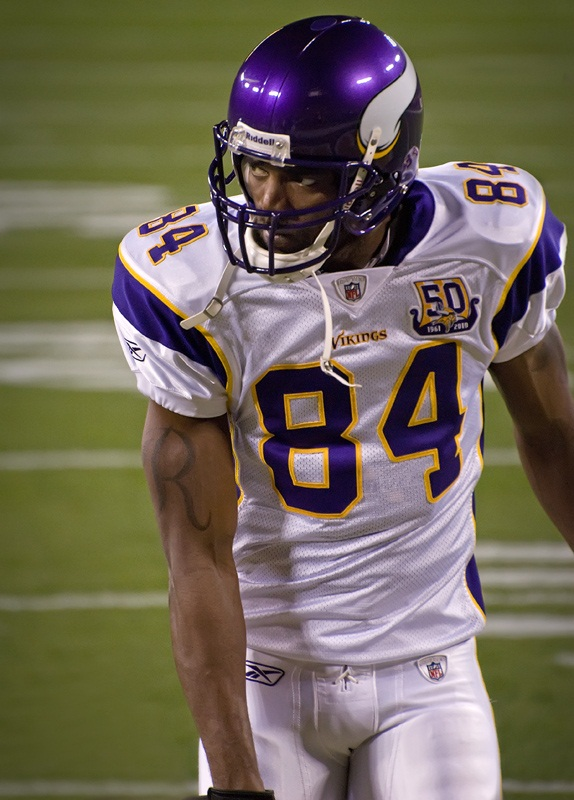
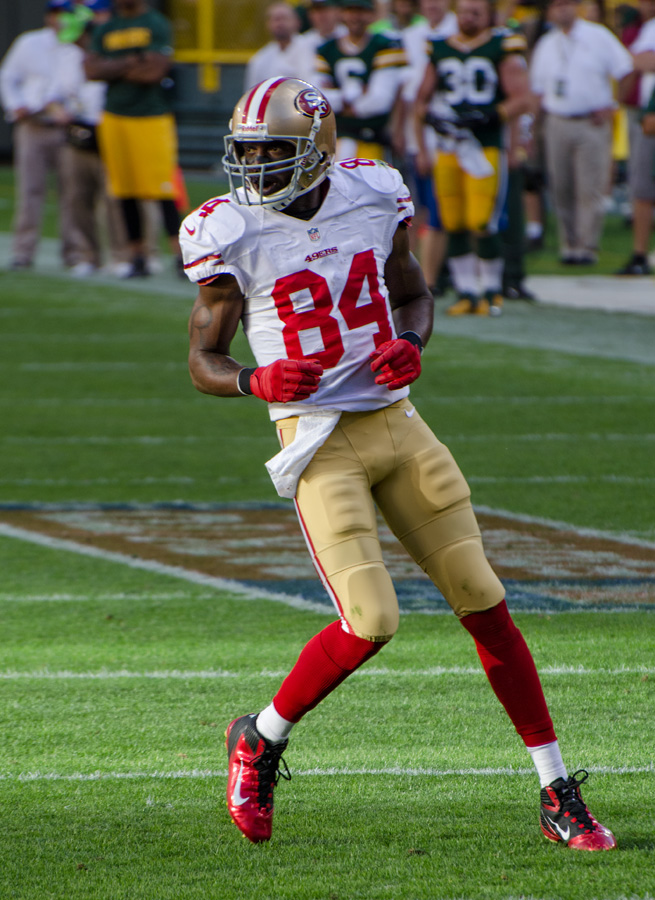
Randy Moss with the Minnesota Vikings in 2010 (left) and the San Francisco 49ers in 2012 (right) after having announced his retirement before the intervening season
- Maxie Baughan (1960–1970, 1974)
- Tom Brady (2000–21, 2022)
- Ross Brupbacher (1970–72, 1976)
- Randall Cunningham (1985–1995, 1997–2001)
- Anthony Davis (2010–14, 2016)
- Steve DeBerg (1977–1993, 1998)
- Aaron Donald (2014–2023, 2026–present)
- Kyle Emanuel (2015–18, 2020)
- Carl Etelman (1924–27, 1929)
- Russ Francis (1975–80, 1982–89)
- Rob Gronkowski (2010–2018, 2020–2021)
- Charles Haley (1986–96, 1998–99)
- Bill Hewitt (1932–39, 1943)
- Ed "Too Tall" Jones (1974–78, 1980–89)
- Marshawn Lynch (2007–2015, 2017–19)
- Rueben Mayes (1986–90, 1992–93)
- Rolando McClain (2010–12, 2014–15)
- Randy Moss (1998–2010, 2012)
- Bronko Nagurski (1930–37, 1943)
- Red Pearlman (1919–1922, 1924)
- Jim Ramey (1979–1985, 1987)
- Manny Rapp (1934, 1937, 1942)
- John Riggins (1971–79, 1981–85)
- Philip Rivers (2004–20, 2025)
- Deion Sanders (1989–2000, 2004–05)
- John Tosi (1939–1942, 1944, 1946)
- Eric Weddle (2007–2019, 2021)
- Reggie White (1984–1998, 2000)
- Ricky Williams (1999–2003, 2005–2011)
- Jason Witten (2003–2017, 2019–2020)

== Association football (soccer) ==
- Pelé (1956–1974, 1975–1977)
- Johan Cruyff (1964–1978, 1979–1984)
- Zico (1971–1989, 1991–1994)
- Diego Maradona (1976–1994, 1995–1997)
- Alan Judge (1978–1997, 2002–2004)
- Aldair (1985–2005, 2007–2008)
- Romário (1985–2007, 2009, 2024–present)
- Jens Lehmann (1987–2010, 2011)
- Marc Overmars (1990–2004, 2008–2009)
- Rivaldo (1990–2014, 2015)
- Roberto Carlos (1991–2012, 2015)
- Dida (1992–2010, 2012–2015)
- Stephen Carr (1993–2008, 2009–2013)
- Paul Scholes (1993–2011, 2012–2013)
- Juan Sebastián Verón (1994–2012, 2013–2014, 2017)
- Landon Donovan (1999–2014, 2016, 2018)
- Ben Foster (2000–2022, 2023)
- Arjen Robben (2000–2019, 2020–2021)
- Adebayo Akinfenwa (2001–2022, 2023)
- Dani Osvaldo (2005–2016, 2020)
- Robbie Rogers (2005–2013, 2013–2017)
- Wojciech Szczęsny (2009–2024, 2024–present)

== Australian rules football ==
- Gary Ablett Sr. (1982, 1984–1990, 1991–1996)
- Tony Lockett (1983–1999, 2002)
- Tim Watson (1977–1991, 1993–1994)
- Paul Salmon (1983–2000, 2002)
- Peter Hudson (1967–1974, 1977)
- Stuart Dew (1997–2006, 2008–2009)
- James McDonald (1997–2010, 2012)
- Shane Heard (1977–1987, 1991)
- Nathan Ablett (2005–2007, 2011)
- Peter McKenna (1965–1975, 1977)
- Shane Mumford (2008–2017, 2019–2021)
- Dermott Brereton (1982–1992, 1994–1995)
- Scott Hodges (1991–1993, 1996)
- Martin Clarke (2007–2009, 2012–2014)

== Baseball ==
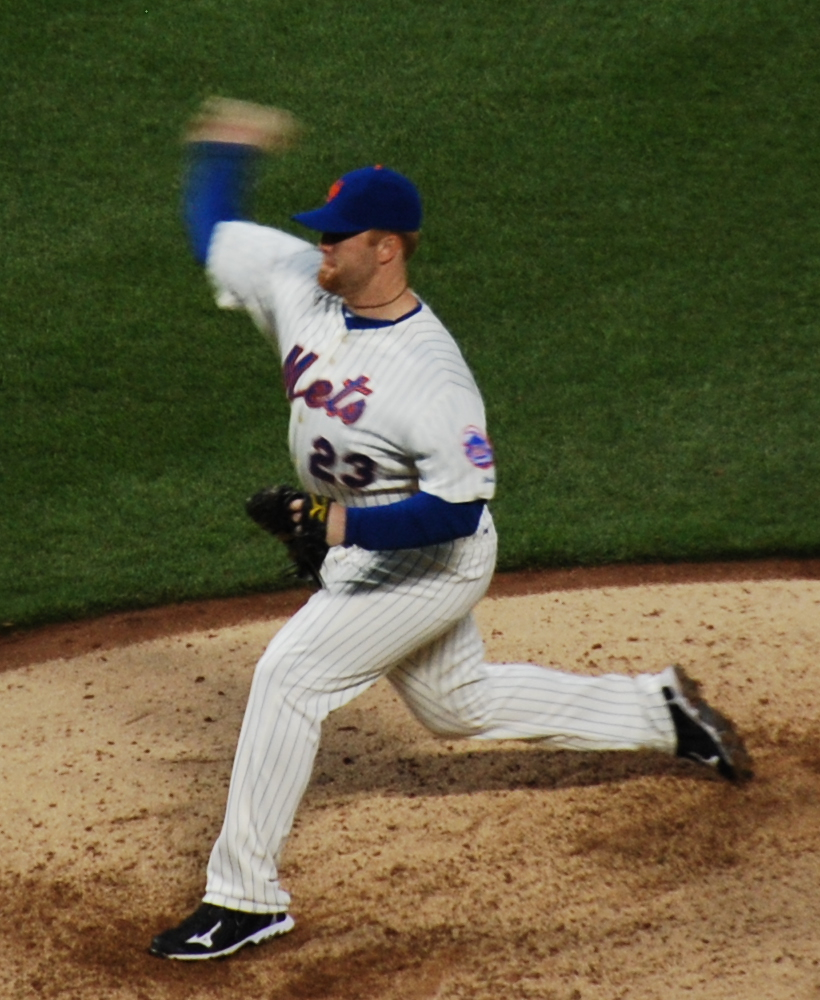
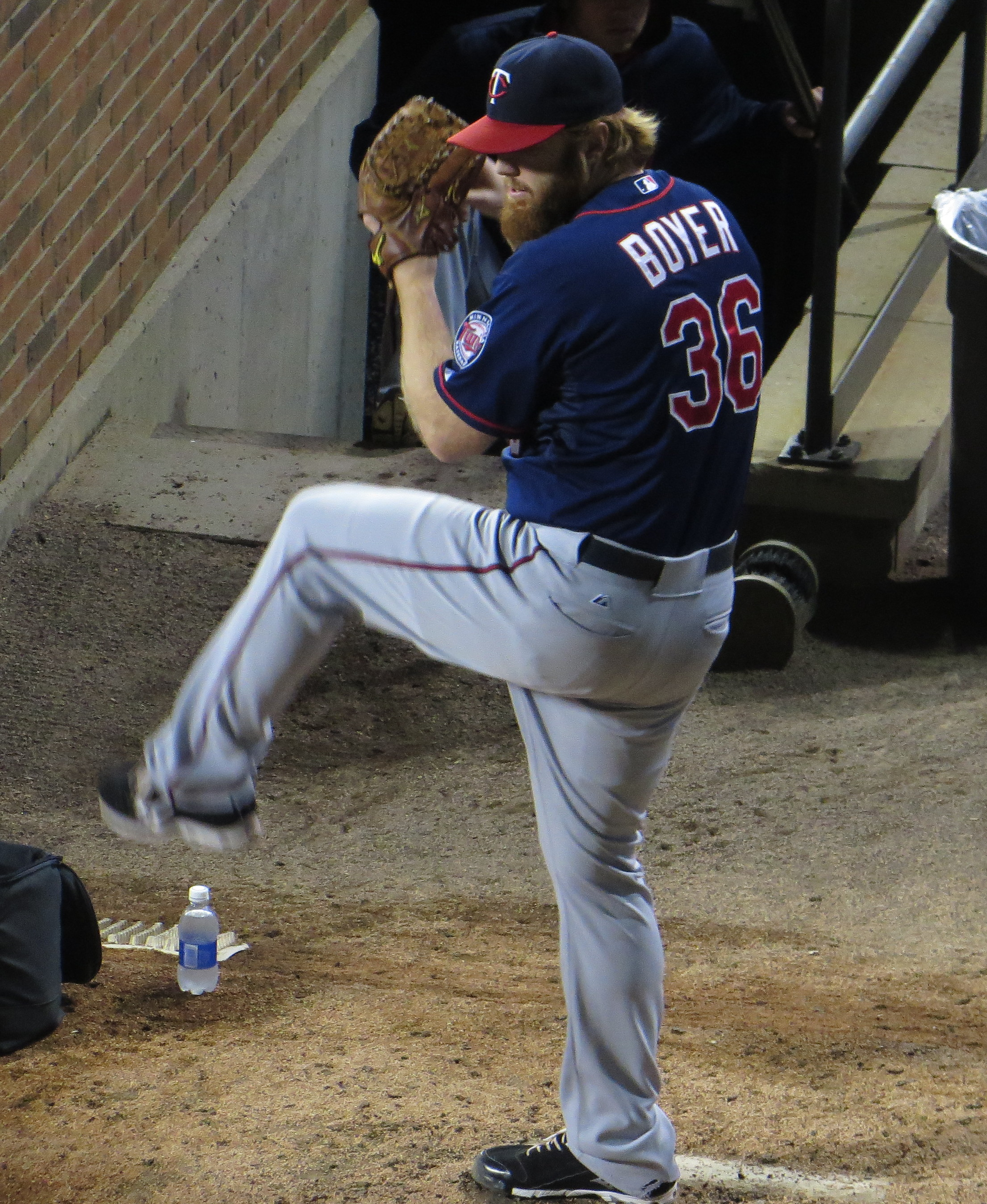
Blaine Boyer with the New York Mets in 2011 (left) and the Minnesota Twins in 2015 (right) before and after retiring and working at a brokerage firm.
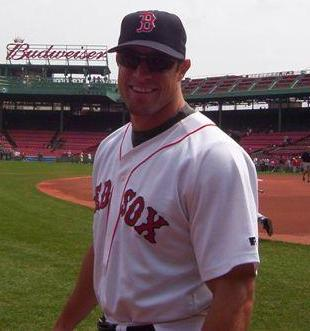
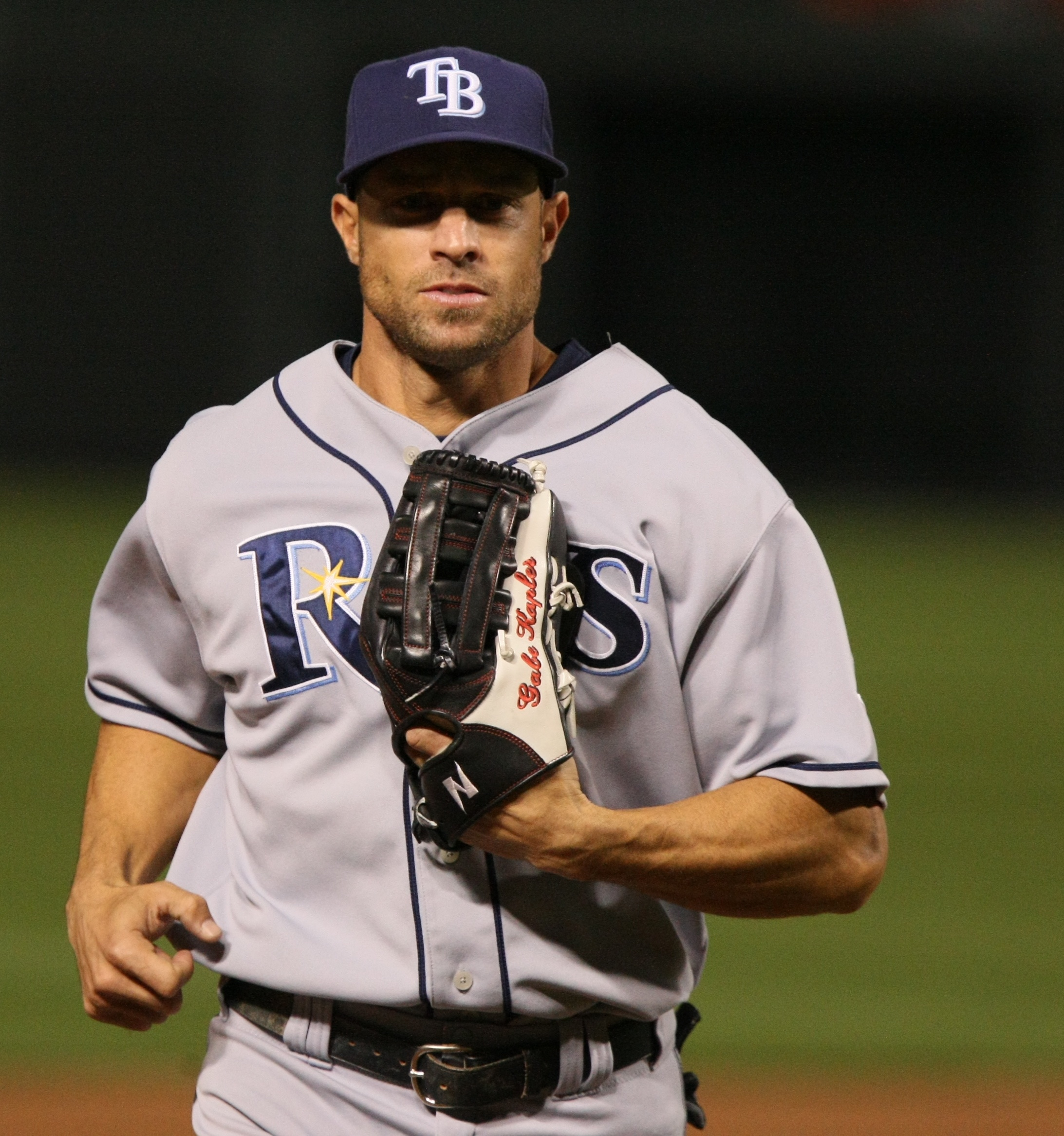
Gabe Kapler with the Boston Red Sox in 2004 (left) and the Tampa Bay Rays in 2009 (right) before and after having retired and served as a Minor League Baseball manager.
- Ed Abbaticchio (1897–1905, 1907–1910)
- Daniel Bard (2009–2013, 2020–2023)
- Chief Bender (1903–1917, 1925)
- Yogi Berra (1946–1963, 1965) (Note: Berra was a coach with the New York Mets when, in 1965, he played four games at catcher.)
- Joe Blanton (2004–2013, 2015–2017)
- Jim Bouton (1962–1970, 1978)
- Blaine Boyer (2005–2011, 2014–2018)
- Dan Brouthers (1879–1896, 1904)
- Chris Chambliss (1971–1986, 1988) (Note: Chambliss came out of retirement only for the stated purpose of retiring as a member of the New York Yankees after a single plate appearance.)
- Ben Chapman (1930–1941, 1944–1946)
- Fred Clarke (1894–1911, 1913–1915) (Note: Clarke was the manager of the Pittsburgh Pirates when he inserted himself into 12 games from 1913–1915.)
- David Cone (1986–2001, 2003)
- Tony Conigliaro (1964–1971, 1975)
- Dizzy Dean (1930–1941, 1947) (Note: Dean was a broadcaster for the St. Louis Browns when, in 1947, he signed a $1 contract to pitch the final game of the season.)
- Mike Donlin (1899–1906, 1908, 1911–1912, 1914)
- Jim Eisenreich (1982–1984, 1987–1998)
- Kevin Elster (1986–1998, 2000)
- Jimmie Foxx (1925–1942, 1944–1945)
- Jerry Grote (1963–1978, 1981)
- Chris Hammond (1990–1998, 2002–2006)
- Emmet Heidrick (1898–1904, 1908)
- Babe Herman (1926–1937, 1945)
- Jackie Jensen (1950–1959, 1961)
- Gabe Kapler (1998–2006, 2008–2010)
- Marc Kroon (1995, 1997–1998, 2004)
- Hod Lisenbee (1937–1932, 1936, 1945)
- Frank Miller (1913, 1916–1919, 1922–1923)
- Minnie Miñoso (1949–1964, 1976, 1980) (Note: Miñoso had a total of ten at bats between his two comeback seasons as a publicity stunt arranged by Chicago White Sox owner Bill Veeck.)
- Charley O'Leary, (1904–1913, 1934) (Note: O'Leary asked into a 1934 game as a 58-year-old coach with the St. Louis Browns and singled in his sole turn at bat, later scoring a run. (The 21-year gap between his original retirement and final appearance is the widest in pro sports history.))
- Jim O'Rourke (1872–1893, 1904) (Note: In 1904, at 54 years old, New York Giants manager John McGraw granted O'Rourke's request to play in a single game. He became the oldest player to play an entire MLB game.)
- Rube Oldring (1905–1916, 1918)
- Joe Page (1944–1950, 1954)
- Satchel Paige (1926–1953, 1965) (Note: Paige pitched in one game in 1965 as a publicity stunt arranged by Kansas City Athletics owner Charles O. Finley.)
- Troy Percival (1995–2005, 2007–2009)
- Andy Pettitte (1995–2010, 2012–2013)
- Ryne Sandberg (1981–1994, 1996–1997)
- Paul Shuey (1994–2003, 2007)
- J. T. Snow (1992–2006, 2008) (Note: Snow came out of retirement only for the stated purpose of retiring as a member of the San Francisco Giants after a brief on-field appearance.)
- Luis Sojo (1990–2001, 2003)
- Dave Stieb (1979–1993, 1998)
- George Strickland (1950–1957, 1959–1960)
- Sam Thompson (1885–1898, 1906)
- Salomón Torres (1993–1997, 2002–2008)
- Clay Touchstone (1928–1929, 1945)
- Hal Trosky (1933–1941, 1943, 1946)
- Arky Vaughan (1932–1943, 1947–1948)
- Lloyd Waner (1927–1942, 1944)

== Basketball ==
- Jonathan Bender (1999–2006, 2009–2010)
- Bob Cousy (1950–1963, 1969–1970)
- Dave Cowens (1970–1980, 1982–83)
- Carlos Delfino (1998–2013, 2017–2025)
- Richie Guerin (1956–1967, 1968–1970)
- Danny Ildefonso (1998–2015, 2023)
- Kevin Johnson (1987–1998, 1999–2000)
- Magic Johnson (1979–1991, 1996)
- Michael Jordan (1984–1993, 1995–1998, 2001–2003)
- George Mikan (1946–1954, 1956)
- Sidney Moncrief (1979–1989, 1990–91)
- John Salley (1986–1996, 1999–2000)
- Robert Reid (1977–1982, 1983–1991)
- Brandon Roy (2006–2011, 2012–13)
- Saulius Štombergas (1992–2007, 2009–2010)
- Rasheed Wallace (1995–2010, 2012–2013)
- Kelly Williams (2006–2019, 2021–present)
- Kevin Willis (1984–2005, 2006–07)

== Boxing ==
- Joe Louis (1934–48, 1950–51)
- Muhammad Ali (1960–1979, 1980–1981)
- Sugar Ray Leonard (1977–1982, 1983–1984, 1986–1987, 1988–1991, 1996–1997)
- George Foreman (1969–1977, 1987–1997)
- Mike Tyson (2024)
- Alexis Arguello (1985, 1994–95)
- Wilfredo Gomez (1988–89)
- Manny Pacquiao (1995–2021, 2025)
- Ricky Hatton (2025)

== Cricket ==
- Imran Khan (1971–1987, 1988–1992)
- Ray Illingworth
- Shahid Afridi

== Cycling ==
- Lance Armstrong (1992–2005, 2009–2011)

== Ice hockey ==
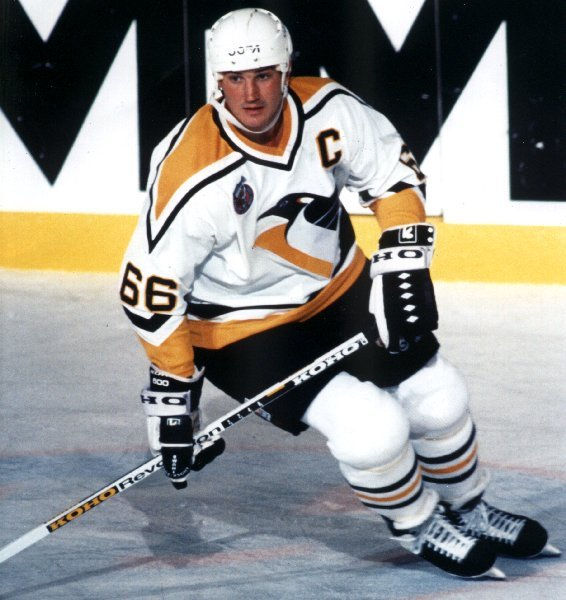
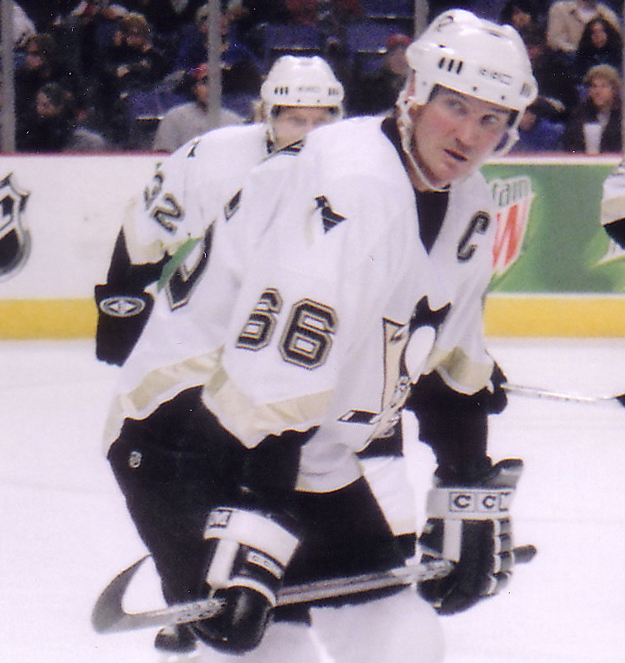
Mario Lemieux in 1992 (left) and 2005 (right) before and after retiring due to Hodgkin lymphoma and other injuries.
- Helmuts Balderis (1973–1985, 1989–1990, 1991–1996)
- Barry Beck (1977–1986, 1989–1990)
- Carl Brewer (1957–1965, 1967–1974, 1979–1980)
- Alexandre Daigle (1993–2000, 2002–2010)
- Ron Ellis (1964–1975, 1977–1981)
- Mike Fisher (1999–2017, 2018)
- Dominik Hasek (1980–2002, 2003–2008, 2009–2011)
- Gordie Howe (1946–1971, 1973–1980, 1997)
- Guy Lafleur (1971–1985, 1988–1991)
- Claude Lemieux (1983–2004, 2008–2009)
- Mario Lemieux (1984–1997, 2000–2006)
- Ted Lindsay (1944–1960, 1964–1965)
- Dickie Moore (1951–1963, 1964–1965, 1967–1968)
- Mark Pavelich (1980–1989, 1991)
- Jim Peplinski (1980–1989, 1995)
- Jacques Plante (1952–1965, 1968–1975)
- Gary Roberts (1985–1996, 1997–2009)
- Al Secord (1978–1990, 1994–1996)
- Steve Smith (1983–1997, 1998–2000)

== Mixed martial arts ==
- Tito Ortiz (1997–2012, 2014–present)
- Randy Couture (1997–2006, 2007–2011)
- Chuck Liddell (1998–2010, 2018)
- Fedor Emelianenko (2000–2012, 2015–present)
- Georges St-Pierre (2002–2013, 2017)
- Urijah Faber (2003–2016, 2019)
- Brock Lesnar (2007–2011, 2016)
- Alexander Gustafsson (2006–2019, 2020–present)

== Motorsports ==
- Neil Bonnett (1974–1990, 1993–1994)
- Ryan Dungey (2006–2017, 2022)
- Niki Lauda (1971–1979, 1982–1985)
- Fred Lorenzen (1956, 1960–1967, 1970–1972)
- Mark Martin (1981–1983, 1986–2006, 2007–2013)
- Michael Schumacher (1991–2006, 2010–2012)

== Professional wrestling ==
- “Stone Cold” Steve Austin (1989–2003, 2022)
- Bob Backlund (1973–1986, 1988–2001, 2007–2018)
- Christian Cage (1995–2014, 2020–present)
- CM Punk (1997–2014, 2021–present)
- Bryan Danielson (1999–2016, 2018–present)
- Bret Hart (1978–2000, 2010–2011)
- Dwayne Johnson (1996–2004, 2011–2019, 2023–present)
- Edge (1992–2011, 2020–present)
- Ric Flair (1972–2008, 2009–2011, 2022)
- Mick Foley (1986–2000, 2004–2012)
- Terry Funk (1965–1997, 1997–1999, 2000–2011, 2013–2016, 2017)
- Bill Goldberg (1997–2004, 2016–2025)
- Lioness Asuka (1980–1989, 1994–2005)
- Shawn Michaels (1984–1998, 2000, 2002–2010, 2018)
- Chigusa Nagayo (1980–1989, 1993–2005, 2008, 2013–2016, 2024)
- Roddy Piper (1969–1999, 2003, 2005–2006, 2009–2011)
- Saraya (2005–2017, 2022–present)
- Ricky Steamboat (1976–1994, 2009–2010, 2022)
- Trish Stratus (2000–2006, 2018, 2019, 2022–present)
- Sting (1985–2016, 2020–2024)

== Rugby union ==
- Andy Goode (1998–2015, 2015–2016, 2020)
- Peter Rogers (1990–2004, 2007–2008)

== Ski jumping ==
- Janne Ahonen (1992–2008, 2009–2011, 2013–2018)

== Swimming ==
- Brent Hayden (2002–12, 2019–present)
- Michael Phelps (2000–12, 2014–16)
- Dara Torres (1984–92, 2000, 2007–12)

== Tennis ==
- Björn Borg (1973–1983, 1991–1993)
- Martina Hingis (1994–2002, 2006–2007, 2013–2017)
- Kim Clijsters (1997–2007, 2009–2012, 2020–2022)
- Justine Henin (1999–2008, 2010–2011)
- Serena Williams (1995–2022, 2026–present)
- Caroline Wozniacki (2005–2020, 2023–present)
