= Paul Vander Haar =

Australian rules footballer

Personal information
- Born: 7 March 1958 (age 68)
- Original team: Ringwood
- Height: 192 cm (6 ft 4 in)
- Weight: 93 kg (205 lb)

Playing career^{1}
| Years | Club | Games (Goals) |
| 1977–1990 | Essendon | 201 (278) |
- ^{1} Playing statistics correct to the end of 1990.

Career highlights
- Victorian state of origin representative 1978, 1982, 1985; Essendon premiership player 1984, 1985

Paul Vander Haar (born 7 March 1958) is a former Australian rules footballer who played for the Essendon Football Club in the Australian Football League (AFL).

Known as the 'Flying Dutchman' due to his heritage and spectacular high marking, Vander Haar was considered one of the most exciting players of his era. However, his at times reckless approach to going for the ball meant that during his 13-year career at the top level, Vander Haar would miss over one third of the games Essendon played, mainly due to a number of serious injuries.

Vander Haar was one of five children (Peter, Paul, Chris, Jackie and Ann Marie) born to Dutch migrants Johan Vander Haar and his wife Lidy.

Growing up in the eastern suburbs, he played his junior football at Ringwood Football Club and was educated at Whitefriars College. During his playing career, his surname was normally spelled as three words: Van Der Haar.

After some persuasion from Essendon coach Bill Stephen, Vander Haar joined the Bombers in 1977, and he was named as the VFL's Recruit of the Year (now known as AFL Rising Star award). He also won the club's Best First-Year Player award and was runner-up in the Crichton Medal, Essendon's best and fairest award. In 1978, his form was negatively affected by neck and back injuries resulting from a trail-bike accident. He returned from this serious injury to be one of Essendon's star players, achieving State selection for Victoria and was runner-up in Essendon's best and fairest in 1982.

Vander Haar played much of his football in the key position of centre half-forward but was also used in defence.

Vander Haar was one of the most important players in the champion Essendon team of the 1980s, which played in finals in 8 of 11 years. This included grand final appearances in 1983–1985 and back-to-back premierships in 1984 and 1985. Vander Haar was also a fine exponent of the torpedo punt, once kicking a goal from such a kick at an estimated 72.5 metres (238 feet), one of the longest goals in VFL/AFL history.

In 1985, Vander Haar kicked a career-best 46 goals, 9 of them in a single game in round 21. He earned 12 Brownlow Medal votes for the year. Out of the Essendon players, this was second only to Tim Watson. Despite his goal-scoring feats, he played as a defender in their Grand Final victory that year. Vander Haar was runner-up (for the 3rd time in his career) in the Essendon best and fairest in 1985. He also represented Victoria in 1985.

Injury again struck early in 1986 when he broke his leg. He only managed a total of 10 games in his next two seasons. His playing career was hampered further in 1987 and 1988 by numerous injuries.

In 1989, Essendon finished second on the ladder in the home-and-away season. He kicked 5 goals in the winning Qualifying Final team against Geelong. Vander Haar was back to his best when, in the Second Semi-Final against the reigning premiers Hawthorn, he was knocked out by Hawthorn enforcer Dermott Brereton. The concussion was serious enough for Vander Haar to miss the preliminary final against Geelong in which Essendon were thrashed. To this day, Vander Haar harbours no ill feelings towards Brereton, and he even built a pool and spa for him a couple of years later. "That's the way the game was. I was the unfortunate one on the wrong end of it," he said.

Vander Haar's final match was the 1990 AFL Grand Final, which Essendon lost to Collingwood by 48 points.

In Kevin Sheedy's book Sheeds: A Touch of Cunning, Sheedy wrote "He (Vander Haar) was one of the most courageous footballers I ever saw". Sheedy also wrote "The best four players I coached in the early days were Terry Daniher, Tim Watson, Simon Madden and Paul Vander Haar, in no particular order".

Since retiring, Vander Haar has followed in his father's footsteps as a tradesman, installing family swimming pools and spas around southern Victoria.

Vander Haar's son Todd plays football for Surrey Park, and he is a member of the James Hird Academy.

In 2002, he was named as one of the top 60 Champions of Essendon.

In June 2015, Vander Haar was inducted into the Essendon Hall of Fame.
