= 1979 SANFL season =

- Teams: 10
- Premiers: Port Adelaide; 25th premiership
- Minor premiers: Central District; 1st minor premiership
- Magarey Medallist: John Duckworth; Central District (44 votes)
- Ken Farmer Medallist: Glynn Hewitt; Woodville (83 goals)

Attendance
- Matches played: 116
- Total attendance: 1,042,254 (8,985 per match)
- Highest: 50,428 (Grand Final, Port Adelaide vs. South Adelaide)

The 1979 South Australian National Football League season was the 100th season of the top-level Australian rules football competition in South Australia.

The final five was Central Districts, Port Adelaide, South Adelaide, Norwood and Woodville. Woodville was competing in the finals for the first time, but lost the Elimination Final to Norwood. Central Districts won their first minor premiership, but lost both its finals, first to Port then to South.

== Ladder ==
1979 SANFL ladder
Pos	Team	Pld	W	L	D	PF	PA	PP	Pts
1	Central District	22	15	6	1	2304	2116	52.13	31
2	Port Adelaide (P)	22	14	8	0	2112	1892	52.75	28
3	South Adelaide	22	14	8	0	2052	1956	51.20	28
4	Norwood	22	11	11	0	2339	1966	54.33	22
5	Woodville	22	10	12	0	2131	2043	51.05	20
6	North Adelaide	22	10	12	0	2134	2360	47.49	20
7	Glenelg	22	9	12	1	2111	2184	49.15	19
8	West Torrens	22	9	12	1	1959	2267	46.36	19
9	Sturt	22	9	13	0	2131	2331	47.76	18
10	West Adelaide	22	7	14	1	2244	2402	48.30	15

Rules for classification: 1) points; 2) percentage; 3) number of points for
(P) Premiers

== Finals series ==
=== Grand Final ===
1979 SANFL Grand Final
Sunday, 30 September (2:10pm)	Port Adelaide	def.	South Adelaide	Football Park (crowd: 50,428)
5.0 (30); 5.3 (33); 9.7 (61); 9.9 (63)	Q1; Q2; Q3; Final	0.0 (0); 3.7 (25); 3.8 (26); 3.14 (32)
This is South Adelaide's last grand final appearance to date.
