= Sam Dunell =

Australian rules football player (born 1990)

Personal information
- Full name: Samuel Luke Dunell
- Born: 21 February 1990 (age 36)
- Original team: Bendigo Bombers (VFL)/Old Melburnians(VAFA)
- Draft: 12, 2012 Rookie Draft, St Kilda
- Height: 189 cm (6 ft 2 in)
- Weight: 84 kg (185 lb)

Playing career^{1}
Years	Club	Games (Goals)
2012–2014	St Kilda	12 (1)
- ^{1} Playing statistics correct to the end of 2014.

Samuel Luke Dunell (born 21 February 1990) is an Australian rules football player who played 12 games over 3 seasons for the St Kilda Football Club in the Australian Football League (AFL) He was recruited by the Williamstown in the Victorian Football League (VFL) from 2015-2019 where he played 100 games for them, kicking 158 goals. He played for Victoria against SA in 2016 and was twice named in the VFL Team of the Year. He finished 2nd in the VFL Liston trophy in 2015 capping off the season with an all conquering premiership win against Box Hill at Docklands. At one stage he was considered the best player in the VFL. He was Club leading goalkicker in 2015 with 41 majors and 2016 with 37 goals, and was runner-up for Williamstown Football Club best and fairest in 2015 and in third place in 2016. He received life membership in 2019 after his final game for Williamstown. He returned to Sandringham Football Club in 2020 and won there Best n Fairest after being runnerup twice in 2013 and 2014.

== AFL ==
Dunell was recruited by St Kilda in the 2012 Rookie Draft, with pick 12. He made his debut in Round 16, 2012, against Brisbane Lions at the Gabba. He is the son of Frank Dunell, a premiership player for Essendon.

== Cricket ==
Dunell vice-captained Under 12 cricket for Victoria alongside current Australian fast bowler James Pattinson. He then vice-captained the first eleven cricket team at Melbourne Grammar School. He also played seconds premier cricket for Essendon Cricket Club until 2011 when he decided to play professional football.
