= Billy Duckworth =

Australian rules footballer

Personal information
- Born: 21 February 1959 (age 67)
- Original team: West Perth
- Height: 187 cm (6 ft 2 in)
- Weight: 85 kg (187 lb)

Playing career^{1}
Years	Club	Games (Goals)
1980–1981, 1991-1992	West Perth	51 (25)
1982–1990	Essendon	126 (64)
Total		177 (89)
- ^{1} Playing statistics correct to the end of 1990.

Career highlights
- 1984 Norm Smith Medalist; West Australian state of origin representative; Dual premiership player with Essendon, 1984 and 1985

William Keith 'Billy' Duckworth (born 21 February 1959) is a former Australian rules footballer who played with Essendon in the VFL and West Perth in the West Australian Football League. He is best known for winning the 1984 Norm Smith Medal. His brother John also played league football.

Duckworth appeared 35 times for the Cardinals (as they were known up to 1982) before being recruited by Essendon. He played as an aggressive defender, often seen at the fullback position. His heroics in the 1984 Grand Final win over Hawthorn earned him best on ground recognition and he won another premiership with the Bombers the following season. Duckworth retired in 1990 and returned to West Perth.

== Statistics ==
Legend
G	Goals	K	Kicks	D	Disposals	T	Tackles
B	Behinds	H	Handballs	M	Marks
#	Played in that season's premiership team

Season	Team	No.	Games	Totals							Averages (per game)							Votes
Season	Team	No.	Games	G	B	K	H	D	M	T	G	B	K	H	D	M	T	Votes
1982	Essendon	22	20	6	4	145	100	245	48	—N/a	0.3	0.2	7.3	5.0	12.3	2.4	—N/a	5
1983	Essendon	22	11	1	1	59	53	112	15	—N/a	0.1	0.1	5.4	4.8	10.2	1.4	—N/a	0
1984^{#}	Essendon	22	24	3	2	229	83	312	56	—N/a	0.1	0.1	9.5	3.5	13.0	2.3	—N/a	2
1985^{#}	Essendon	22	6	2	1	59	34	93	22	—N/a	0.3	0.2	9.8	5.7	15.5	3.7	—N/a	1
1986	Essendon	22	14	14	13	129	50	179	40	—N/a	1.0	0.9	9.2	3.6	12.8	2.9	—N/a	1
1987	Essendon	22	14	15	7	107	47	154	42	26	1.1	0.5	7.6	3.4	11.0	3.0	1.9	0
1988	Essendon	22	20	15	6	179	84	263	63	28	0.8	0.3	9.0	4.2	13.2	3.2	1.4	3
1989	Essendon	22	13	7	7	115	53	168	45	19	0.5	0.5	8.9	4.1	12.9	3.5	1.5	1
1990	Essendon	22	4	1	2	30	11	41	8	2	0.3	0.5	7.5	2.8	10.3	2.0	0.5	0
Career			126	64	43	1052	515	1567	339	75	0.5	0.3	8.3	4.1	12.4	2.7	1.5	13

== Honours and achievements ==
Team

- 2× VFL premiership player (Essendon): 1984, 1985
- 4× McClelland Trophy (Essendon): 1984, 1985, 1989, 1990

Individual

- Norm Smith Medal: 1984
- State of Origin (Western Australia): 1987
