= Frank Dunell =

Australian rules footballer

Personal information
- Born: 17 March 1958 (age 68)
- Original team: Windsor-Zillmere (QAFL)
- Height: 185 cm (6 ft 1 in)
- Weight: 85 kg (187 lb)

Playing career^{1}
Years	Club	Games (Goals)
1979–1986	Essendon	100 (57)
1987–1988	Brisbane Bears	15 (4)
Total		115 (61)
- ^{1} Playing statistics correct to the end of 1988.

Frank Dunell (born 17 March 1958) is a former Australian rules footballer who played with the Essendon Bombers and the Brisbane Bears in the Victorian Football League (VFL).

Originally from Queensland Australian Football League (QAFL) club Windsor-Zillmere, Dunell was recruited by the Essendon Bombers and made his senior VFL debut in 1979.

Dunell played in many positions during his career, including half back, the wing, forward pocket and at full forward. He was first recruited as a high flying forward from Windsor Zillmere however his mosT consistent form was found when he played down back. He missed the 83 grand final against the Hawks along with Ron Andrews and both played major roles in winning the reserve grade final against Collingwood that day. It was in the forward pocket where he played in Essendon's 1984 premiership. That year he also was a member of Essendon's night premiership team. In 1985 he incurred an injury to his knee just before seasons end missing the all conquering performance against the Hawks. He played more games than anyone else in the bombers most successful era (1983-86) and he remained with the club until the end of the 1986 VFL season when he returned home to Brisbane and became a member of the Brisbane Bears original squad for the 1987 VFL season. Dunell spent two injury interrupted seasons with Brisbane before retiring at the end of the 1988 season. He was the first Queenslander to win a VFL premiership and was later recognised as a member of the QLD Origin team of the century.

Dunell has coached in the VAFA since his retirement firstly as a player coach with St Bernards in 1991-1993 where he took them to A Grade after winning the B-Grade premiership. He then coached various sides in North Old Boys, Old Essendon, Old Melbournians and finally Old Geelong. He was the senior coach of the VAFA State under 23 team and in 2005 took the All Australian Amateur team to Ireland to play against the All Ireland team as the head coach. After coaching he has since become a Board member of the VAFA occupying roles as Vice President and Treasurer.

Dunell's son Sam played for Australian Football League (AFL) club St Kilda.
