= David Honybun =

Australian rules footballer (born 1962)

Personal information
- Full name: David Honybun
- Born: 3 April 1962 (age 64)
- Original team: Coleambally (MFL)
- Height: 196 cm (6 ft 5 in)
- Weight: 91 kg (201 lb)
- Position: Ruckman

Playing career^{1}
Years	Club	Games (Goals)
1984	Carlton	5 (2)
1988–1992	Richmond	55 (39)
Total		60 (41)
- ^{1} Playing statistics correct to the end of 1992.

David Honybun (born 3 April 1962) is a former Australian rules footballer who played with Carlton and Richmond in the Victorian Football League (VFL) and Australian Football League (AFL).

Originally from Coleambally in the New South Wales-based Murray Football League (MFL), Honybun attended Scotch College and the University of Melbourne, where he played for Melbourne University Blacks in the Victorian Amateur Football Association (VAFA).

Honybun represented the VAFA against the Victorian Football Association (VFA) in 1982 before moving to Carlton where he made his senior VFL debut in 1984.
