= Michael McCarthy (Australian footballer) =

Australian rules footballer

Personal information
- Born: 10 October 1957 (age 69)
- Original team: Frankston YCW
- Height: 193 cm (6 ft 4 in)
- Weight: 89 kg (196 lb)

Playing career^{1}
Years	Club	Games (Goals)
1978–1986	Hawthorn	99 (65)
1987–1988	Brisbane Bears	27 (9)
1989, 1990	Frankston	14 (19)
1989	Sandringham	2 (1)
Total		142 (94)
- ^{1} Playing statistics correct to the end of 1988.

Michael McCarthy (born 10 October 1957) is a former Australian rules footballer who played with Hawthorn and the Brisbane Bears in the Victorian Football League (VFL).

McCarthy played most of his football across half back but could also play up forward when required.

McCarthy won Hawthorn's reserves Best and Fairest in 1980, was a premiership player with Hawthorn in 1978 and 1983 and played in losing grand finals in 1984 and 1985.

In 1987 he joined Brisbane for their inaugural VFL season and played with the club for two years.
