= John Duckworth (footballer) =

Australian rules footballer

Personal information
- Full name: Arthur John Duckworth
- Nickname: Whatsa
- Born: 19 January 1949 (age 77); Lake Grace, Western Australia
- Original team: Dudinin
- Height: 193 cm (6 ft 4 in)
- Weight: 96 kg (212 lb)

Playing career^{1}
Years	Club	Games (Goals)
1970, 1974–76	Fitzroy	58 (24)
1977–78, 1981–83, 1985	West Perth	117 (39)
1979–1980	Central District	42 (56)
Total		217 (119)

Representative team honours
Years	Team	Games (Goals)
1977–1978	Western Australia	3 (0)
	South Australia	3 (?)
- ^{1} Playing statistics correct to the end of 1985.

Career highlights
- Magarey Medal 1979; Central District leading goalkicker 1979

Arthur John Duckworth (born 19 January 1949) is a former Australian rules footballer who played for Fitzroy in the Victorian Football League (VFL), West Perth in the West Australian National Football League (WANFL), and Central District in the South Australian National Football League (SANFL). He is the older brother of former Essendon footballer Billy Duckworth.

Born in Western Australia, Duckworth started his football career in Victoria with Fitzroy. He had been in Melbourne due to National Service training and after approaching Fitzroy found himself recruited for the 1970 season. Duckworth played 11 games that year but did not play again until 1974 as a result of both his military commitments and a stint in Vietnam. His last VFL season was in 1976 and the following year he returned to Western Australia where he joined West Perth. He played 44 games over two years, during this time he represented his state at interstate football.

In 1979 he was picked up by SANFL club Central District and in his debut season won the Magarey Medal, topped the club's goalkicking and played interstate football for his second state. A ruptured kidney at the start of the 1980 season kept him out for most of the year and at the end of the season he decided to return to West Perth to finish his career. He played 42 games for Central District and finished with a total of 120 games for West Perth. John was known as the longest kick seen in VFL and was regularly seen to kick over 80 metres including one at Waverley of over 90 metres. The pack would stand too close to John and then turn and run after the ball.
