= David O'Halloran =

Australian rules footballer

Personal information
- Full name: David Neil O'Halloran
- Born: 8 September 1955
- Died: 11 April 2013 (aged 57); Merimbula, New South Wales
- Original team: Ivanhoe Grammar
- Debut: 1976, Hawthorn vs. St Kilda
- Height: 185 cm (6 ft 1 in)
- Weight: 92 kg (203 lb)

Playing career^{1}
Years	Club	Games (Goals)
1976–1985	Hawthorn	160 (19)
- ^{1} Playing statistics correct to the end of 1985.

David Neil O'Halloran (8 September 1955 – 11 April 2013) was an Australian rules footballer who played with Hawthorn in the Victorian Football League (VFL).

Recruited from Ivanhoe Grammar School, O'Halloran debuted for Hawthorn in 1976 as a defender and was a premiership player that year. Nicknamed "Rubber", O'Halloran won another premiership with Hawthorn in 1983 and after being on the losing grand final team two years later he left Hawthorn, finishing with 160 games. A Victorian representative in interstate football, O'Halloran was selected in the 1982 'Team of the Year' by the VFL.

== Death ==
Married with two children, O'Halloran died from a heart attack while cycling on 11 April 2013 at age 57.
