= Glenn Hawker =

Australian rules footballer

Personal information
- Full name: Glenn Hawker
- Born: 17 March 1961 (age 65)
- Original team: Kaniva
- Height: 185 cm (6 ft 1 in)
- Weight: 84 kg (185 lb)

Playing career^{1}
Years	Club	Games (Goals)
1978–1988	Essendon	200 (172)
1989–1991	Carlton	27 (26)
Total		227 (198)
- ^{1} Playing statistics correct to the end of 1991.

Glenn Hawker (born 17 March 1961) is a former Australian rules footballer. A classy right footer for the Essendon Football Club during the late 1970s and 1980s, Hawker played 200 games for the Bombers, including their 1984 and 1985 premiership sides, before finishing his career with rival team Carlton. He was originally from Kaniva, Victoria.

In 2025, he was named at Number 25 in Don The Stat's Top 100 Essendon Players Since 1980.
