= Roger Merrett =

Australian rules footballer (born 1960)

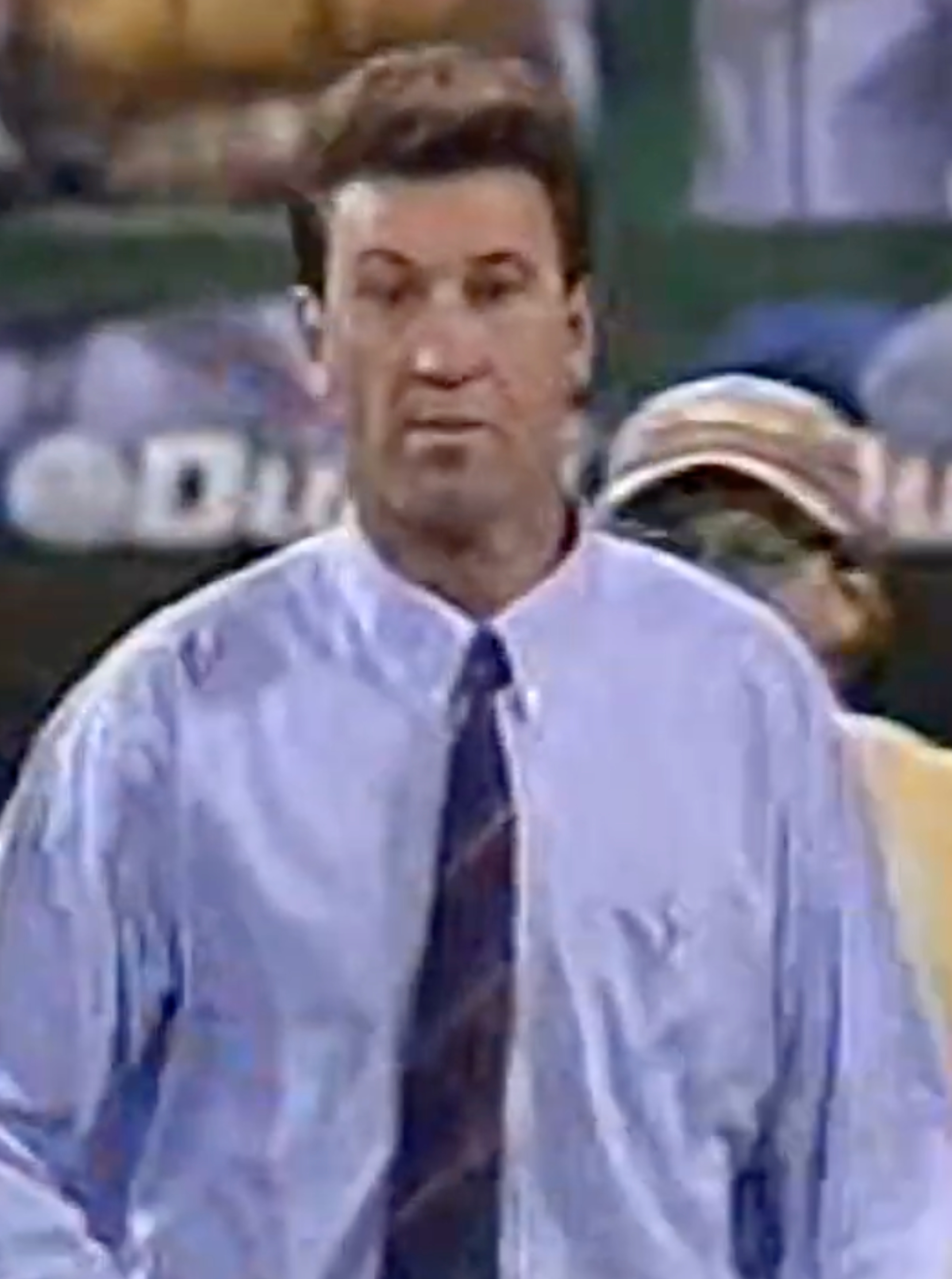
- Merrett in April 1996

Personal information
- Born: 19 April 1960 (age 66)
- Original team: Kaniva
- Debut: Round 1, 1 April 1978, Essendon vs. South Melbourne, at Windy Hill
- Height: 195 cm (6 ft 5 in)
- Weight: 100 kg (220 lb)
- Positions: Full forward, ruckman

Playing career^{1}
Years	Club	Games (Goals)
1978–1987	Essendon	149 (148)
1988–1996	Brisbane Bears	164 (285)
Total		313 (433)

Coaching career
Years	Club	Games (W–L–D)
1998	Brisbane Lions	11 (3–7–1)
- ^{1} Playing statistics correct to the end of 1996.

Career highlights
- VFL debut for Essendon on 1 April 1978 vs South Melbourne at Windy Hill; VFL Gardiner Medallist 1982; Essendon Premiership player 1984, 1985; Brisbane Bears captain 1990–1996; Brisbane Bears leading goalkicker 1993–1995; Victorian State of Origin Captain 1985; Queensland State Captain 1991

Roger Merrett (born 19 April 1960) is a former Australian rules footballer who played in two Victorian Football League premiership sides with the Essendon Football Club in the mid-1980s before moving to the fledgling Brisbane Bears, later captaining the new club for seven seasons. He ended his career as the games record holder for the Brisbane Bears, in addition to being the last VFL/AFL player from the 1970s to retire from professional football.

== Playing career ==
=== Essendon ===
Merrett was a strong competitor for the Essendon Football Club during the first part of his playing career from 1978 to 1987. For Essendon, he played 149 games and kicked a total of 148 goals. Merrett was also a member of Essendon's premiership teams in 1984 and 1985.

=== Brisbane Bears ===
He moved to the Brisbane Bears in 1988 as captain. Merrett became a strong and inspirational captain of the Bears, at first alternating in the ruck with Mark Mickan. After John Hutton's inconsistent form at full-forward reached an end, Merrett's tired legs were moved permanently to the position where he was able to use his height and kicking abilities to spearhead the club as their leading goalkicker for many seasons before Alastair Lynch proved a suitable replacement. Merrett retired from his playing career at the end of the 1996 season.

Merrett played a total of 164 games and kicked a total of 285 goals for Brisbane Bears from 1988 until 1996.

He played on for many years, earning the nickname Roger the Dodger (with reference to his age) before his eventual retirement.

== Coaching career ==
=== Brisbane Lions ===
Merrett held coaching ambitions for much of his career, and after his retirement from his playing career at the end of the 1996 season, he was immediately recruited by his senior coach John Northey to fill an assistant coaching role at the Brisbane Lions (formed on 1 November 1996 from a merger between the Brisbane Bears and the Fitzroy Football Club). However, relations between the two men were cool, and half-way through the 1998 season, with the Lions at the bottom of the ladder, Northey was sacked as senior coach and Merrett was appointed caretaker senior coach of Brisbane Lions for the rest of the 1998 season. Merrett then led Brisbane Lions to three wins, one draw and seven losses of the remaining eleven games in the 1998 season to still finish in last place on the ladder, which was the sixteenth position for the wooden spoon. At the end of the 1998 season, Merrett was however not retained as Brisbane Lions senior coach and was replaced by Australian football legend Leigh Matthews. Merrett has not been closely involved in football since, outside of occasional club functions at Brisbane and Essendon.

== Life after football ==
Merrett now lives on the Gold Coast, Queensland, where he operates a post office. He also provides special comments for ABC Radio broadcasts of Brisbane Lions home matches.

The Brisbane Lions' award for their best-and-fairest player over a season, the Merrett–Murray Medal, is partly named after him.

For 2009 AFLQ season, Merrett was part-time assistant coach for AFLQ power house, Southport Sharks.

On 18 January 2011, Merrett suffered a stroke, thought to be related to a hereditary heart condition.

In 2016, he joined the Bond University Bullsharks in a volunteer capacity and to assist his son Ben who took on the reserves coaching job.
