= Colin Waterson (footballer) =

Australian rules footballer (born 1959)

Personal information
- Full name: Colin Waterson
- Born: 25 June 1959 (age 67)
- Original team: Nullawil
- Height: 192 cm (6 ft 4 in)
- Weight: 89 kg (196 lb)

Playing career^{1}
Years	Club	Games (Goals)
1978, 1980–81	Richmond	13 (9)
- ^{1} Playing statistics correct to the end of 1981.

Colin Waterson (born 25 June 1959) is a former Australian rules footballer who played with Richmond in the Victorian Football League (VFL).

In 1982 he moved to Western Australia where he continued to play football for East Fremantle in the West Australian Football League (WAFL).
