= Paul Weston (footballer) =

Australian rules footballer

Personal information
- Full name: Paul L. Weston
- Born: 9 April 1957 (age 69); Adelaide, South Australia
- Original team: Glengowrie High School
- Height: 188 cm (6 ft 2 in)
- Weight: 85 kg (187 lb)
- Positions: Centre, key defender

Playing career^{1}
Years	Club	Games (Goals)
1973–1982	Glenelg	196 (176)
1983–1985	Essendon	60 (12)
1986–1988	West Torrens	49 (21)
1989	Norwood	23 (8)
Total		328 (217)

Representative team honours
Years	Team	Games (Goals)
	South Australia	13

Coaching career^{3}
Years	Club	Games (W–L–D)
1986–1988	West Torrens	66 (24–42–0)
- ^{1} Playing statistics correct to the end of 1989.^{3} Coaching statistics correct as of 1988.

Career highlights
- Club: 2x VFL premiership: 1984, 1985; 2x Glenelg best and fairest: 1976, 1980; West Torrens best and fairest: 1987; Glenelg captain: 1979–1982; West Torrens captain-coach: 1986–1988; Representative: Fos Williams Medal: 1982; South Australia captain: 1981–1982; Overall: South Australian Football Hall of Fame: 2002

Paul L. Weston (born 9 April 1957) is a former Australian rules footballer who played with Essendon in the Victorian Football League (VFL) as well as Glenelg, West Torrens and Norwood in the South Australian National Football League (SANFL) during the 1970s and 1980s.

== Early career ==
Weston started his career at Glenelg whilst still studying at Glengowrie High School. He quickly established himself as a key player, winning the club best and fairest in 1976 and taking the captaincy in 1979 at only 21 years of age. However, premiership success was elusive; during his time with the Tigers, Weston was a member of five losing grand finals – in 1974, 1975, 1977, 1981 and 1982. Frustrated by the lack of premiership success in his home state, Weston decided to try his luck in Victoria. Essendon won the race to recruit Weston and he relocated to Melbourne in January 1983 to begin training with the club. However, there was a disagreement with the transfer fee; Glenelg had asked for AUD 175,000, but Essendon's offer was around AUD 90,000. The case was taken to the National Football League Appeals Board, which in March 1983 set an undisclosed compromise fee that both Essendon and Glenelg were expected to agree on. Weston said afterward: "I am very relieved and happy ... I can now get on with the business of playing football instead of worrying about court cases."

== Success ==
Weston had played mostly as a centreman at Glenelg, but became a key defender while at Essendon. Weston made an immediate impression at his new club, winning the most consistent player award in his first season. But it seemed the curse of losing grand finals had followed him; Essendon were thrashed by Hawthorn in the 1983 VFL Grand Final. Weston, and Essendon, had their revenge when they won back-to-back premierships against Hawthorn in 1984 and 1985. He was a South Australian State of Origin representative and won a Fos Williams Medal in 1982 for his performance against Western Australia at Football Park. Weston returned to South Australia in 1986 to take up a captain-coach role at West Torrens for three seasons, one of the last of his kind. He finished his football career with Norwood.
