= Shane Heard =

Australian rules footballer

Personal information
- Full name: Shane Heard
- Born: 28 July 1958 (age 68)
- Original teams: Horsham Homers, Horsham DFNL
- Height: 177 cm (5 ft 10 in)
- Weight: 79 kg (174 lb)

Playing career^{1}
Years	Club	Games (Goals)
1977–87, 1991	Essendon	168 (39)
- ^{1} Playing statistics correct to the end of 1991.

Shane Heard (born 28 July 1958) is a former Australian rules footballer who played with Essendon in the VFL/AFL. He was recruited from the Horsham Homers Football Club in the Horsham District Football League.

Heard started his career in 1977 and developed into a high quality tagger.

Heard played in the 1983 VFL grand final loss to Hawthorn and was a member of Essendon's 1984 VFL Premiership team, playing on the wing, tagging Robert DiPierdomenico.

Heard missed out on the 1985 Essendon premiership when he pulled his hamstring in the last training session prior to the grand final.

He retired at the end of the 1987 season but was lured back to the club in 1991 for one final year. Where he was regularly regarded for his unbelievable tagging ability.

Heard played in the 1992 and 1993 Ainslie premiership teams, prior to returning to the Wimmera region.
