= Simon Madden =

Australian rules footballer, born 1957

Personal information
- Full name: Simon John Madden
- Born: 30 December 1957 (age 68)
- Original team: St Christopher's
- Height: 198 cm (6 ft 6 in)
- Weight: 99 kg (218 lb)
- Position: Ruckman/Tall forward

Playing career^{1}
Years	Club	Games (Goals)
1974–1992	Essendon	378 (575)

Representative team honours
Years	Team	Games (Goals)
	Victoria	17 (21)
- ^{1} Playing statistics correct to the end of 1992.

Career highlights
- Club: 2x VFL Premiership: 1984, 1985; 3x All-Australian: 1983, 1987–1988; 6× VFL team of the year: 1983–1984, 1987–1990; 4x Essendon best and fairest: 1977, 1979, 1983–1984; 3x Essendon leading goalkicker 1980, 1982, 1991; Norm Smith Medal: 1985; Essendon captain 1980–1981; Team of the Century; Australian Football Hall of Fame; Representative: Simpson Medal: 1990; 3x Victoria Captain: 1989–1991

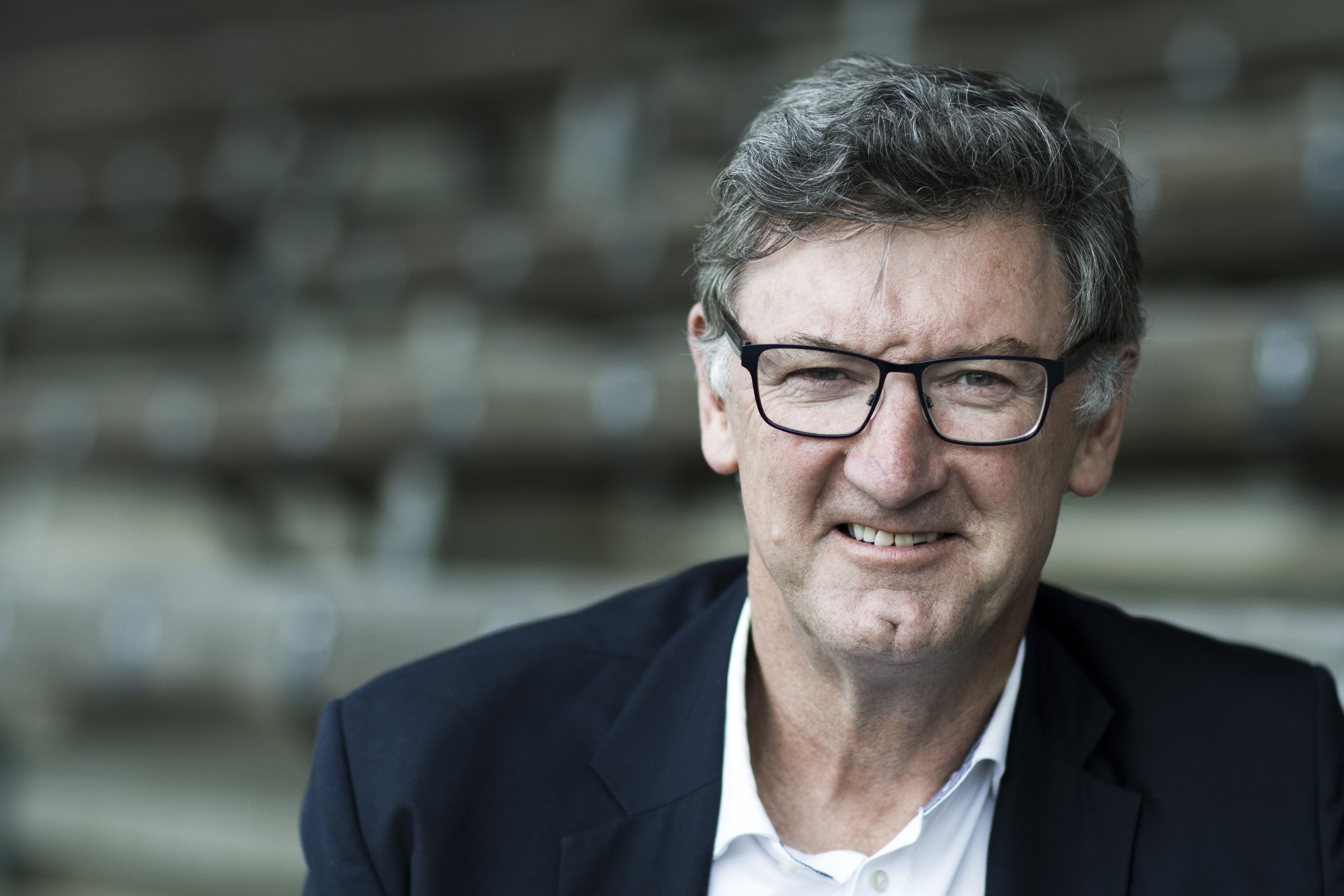
Simon Madden, former AFL player & Founder, Simon Madden Consulting

Simon John Madden (born 30 December 1957) is a former Australian rules footballer who played his entire 19-season career with the Essendon Football Club from 1974 until 1992. Madden is one of the most decorated players in the club's history and widely regarded as one of the finest ruckmen to ever play the game.

== Early life ==
Madden was born in Melbourne; he attended primary school at St Christopher's in Airport West and had his secondary schooling at St. Bernard's College in Essendon, a school renowned for its sporting prowess. He then studied teaching at the Institute of Catholic Education (now the Australian Catholic University).

His younger brother Justin played football for Carlton and later became a Victorian state politician.

== AFL career ==
In all, he played 378 senior matches, the second-most by any Essendon player (behind Dustin Fletcher), and eighth-most in league history (behind Brent Harvey, Michael Tuck, Shaun Burgoyne, Kevin Bartlett, Dustin Fletcher, Scott Pendlebury and Robert Harvey). In addition to playing in the ruck, Madden was a handy part-time forward, kicking 575 goals in his career, a club record that stood until it was broken in 2003 by full-forward Matthew Lloyd.

Madden won four Essendon best and fairest awards (1977, 1979, 1983 and 1984) and captained the side in the 1980 and 1981 seasons. He played in the back-to-back premiership sides in 1984 and 1985, winning the Norm Smith Medal for best on ground in the 1985 Grand Final. In 1986, Madden rejected an unheard-of offer for a 3-year contract totalling $550,000 (~$1.73 million in 2023 terms) by the eccentric Geoffrey Edelsten on behalf of the Sydney Swans, instead choosing to remain with Essendon for his entire career. Regarding the offer, Madden replied, "You can take the boy out of Essendon, but you can't take Essendon out of the boy." However, Madden estimated that, in 2009 dollars (when he was interviewed) and taking into account the cost of buying a house, etc., it was actually the equivalent of $4.4 million over three years. However, Madden claimed that he never regretted the decision.

He was named in the All-Australian Team on three occasions (1983, 1987 and 1988). Madden captained the Victorian interstate team in 1989–91, and in 1990 received the Simpson Medal for best on ground in the Victoria vs. Western Australia match played in Perth.

He was named in the ruck in Essendon's Team of the Century and named as the fifth-best player ever to play for the club in the "Champions of Essendon" list.

After his playing days were over, Madden had a brief stint as ruck coach for Carlton. He was with the Blues for the 1993 season, in which they made the grand final but lost to Madden's former club, Essendon.

He was president of the AFL Players' Association from 1985 until 1989.

== Statistics ==
Legend
G	Goals	K	Kicks	D	Disposals	T	Tackles
B	Behinds	H	Handballs	M	Marks	H/O	Hit-outs
#	Played in that season's premiership team

Led the league after finals only

Season	Team	No.	Games	Totals								Averages (per game)								Votes
Season	Team	No.	Games	G	B	K	H	D	M	T	H/O	G	B	K	H	D	M	T	H/O	Votes
1974	Essendon	27	6	18	8	52	8	60	28	—N/a	0	3.0	1.3	8.7	1.3	10.0	4.7	—N/a	0.0	2
1975	Essendon	27	19	37	29	138	19	157	59	—N/a	29	1.9	1.6	7.7	1.1	8.7	3.3	—N/a	4.8	0
1976	Essendon	27	20	28	18	123	43	166	78	—N/a	86	1.4	0.9	6.2	2.2	8.3	3.9	—N/a	4.5	3
1977	Essendon	27	20	33	11	234	81	315	126	—N/a	378	1.7	0.6	11.7	4.1	15.8	6.3	—N/a	19.9	25
1978	Essendon	27	22	40	25	199	72	271	138	—N/a	301	1.8	1.1	9.0	3.3	12.3	6.3	—N/a	14.3	7
1979	Essendon	27	23	39	31	220	106	326	158	—N/a	263	1.7	1.3	9.6	4.6	14.2	6.9	—N/a	11.4	3
1980	Essendon	27	21	45	27	176	95	271	111	—N/a	211	2.1	1.3	8.4	4.5	12.9	5.3	—N/a	10.0	5
1981	Essendon	27	19	36	34	135	69	204	89	—N/a	236	1.9	1.8	7.1	3.6	10.7	4.7	—N/a	12.4	7
1982	Essendon	27	21	49	25	142	74	216	92	—N/a	230	2.3	1.2	6.8	3.5	10.3	4.4	—N/a	11.0	7
1983	Essendon	27	26	26	16	235	156	391	179	—N/a	812	1.0	0.6	9.0	6.0	15.0	6.9	—N/a	31.2	22
1984^{#}	Essendon	27	24	27	17	177	137	314	151	—N/a	699	1.1	0.7	7.4	5.7	13.1	6.3	—N/a	29.1	14
1985^{#}	Essendon	27	20	19	21	163	123	286	136	—N/a	322	1.0	1.1	8.2	6.2	14.3	6.8	—N/a	16.1	11
1986	Essendon	27	23	25	11	182	112	294	114	—N/a	338	1.1	0.5	7.9	4.9	12.8	5.0	—N/a	14.7	4
1987	Essendon	27	14	9	4	85	65	150	69	12	252	0.6	0.3	6.1	4.6	10.7	4.9	0.9	18.0	1
1988	Essendon	27	22	31	8	183	95	278	138	27	257	1.4	0.4	8.3	4.3	12.6	6.3	1.2	11.7	16
1989	Essendon	27	25	33	16	239	81	320	138	28	350	1.3	0.6	9.6	3.2	12.8	5.5	1.1	14.0	3
1990	Essendon	27	23	30	16	195	6	2616	116	22	225	1.3	0.7	8.5	2.9	11.3	5.0	1.0	9.8	4
1991	Essendon	27	23	42	15	203	71	274	122	14	209	1.8	0.7	8.8	3.1	11.9	5.3	0.6	9.1	5
1992	Essendon	27	7	8	2	39	18	57	21	3	28	1.1	0.3	5.6	2.6	8.1	3.0	0.4	4.0	0
Career			378	575	334	3120	1491	4611	2063	106	5226	1.5	0.9	8.3	3.9	12.2	5.5	0.9	14.7	139

== Honours and achievements ==
Team

- 2× VFL premiership player (Essendon): 1984, 1985
- 4× McClelland Trophy (Essendon): 1984, 1985, 1989, 1990

Individual

- Norm Smith Medal: 1985
- 3× All-Australian team: 1983, 1987, 1988
- 6× VFL Team of the Year: 1983, 1984, 1987, 1988, 1989, 1990
- 4× Crichton Medal: 1977, 1979, 1983, 1984
- 3× Essendon leading goalkicker: 1980, 1982, 1991
- Essendon captain: 1980–1981
- Essendon Team of the Century 1897-1996
- Australian Football Hall of Fame: 1996 Inductee
- Simpson Medal: 1990
- E. J. Whitten Medal: 1990
- 5× State of Origin (Victoria): 1983, 1984, 1989 (c), 1990 (c), 1991 (c)

== Life After AFL ==
Madden has an extended background in education and worked as a teacher for 15 years, attaining the position of Vice Principal.

Madden was President of the AFL Players' Association from 1985 to 1989.

Madden became head coach of St. Bernards Old Collegians Football Club in 2005.

He now spends a considerable amount of time in the classic rock band Better Late Than Never playing at local pubs and clubs with a group of long-term friends.
