= Leon Baker =

Australian rules footballer

Personal information
- Full name: Leon Francis Baker
- Born: 17 August 1956 (age 70)
- Original teams: Avenel, Sandhurst, South Bunbury
- Height: 183 cm (6 ft 0 in)
- Weight: 85 kg (13 st 5 lb)

Playing career^{1}
Years	Club	Games (Goals)
1981–1983	Swan Districts (WAFL)	64 (100)
1984–1988	Essendon (VFL)	86 (70)
Total		150 (170)
- ^{1} Playing statistics correct to the end of 1988.

Career highlights
- 2× AFL premiership player: 1984, 1985; Swan Districts premierships 1982, 1983; Swan Medal 1983; All Australian Team 1985; WA State of Origin Team 1984,1985,1986

Leon Francis Baker (born 17 August 1956) is a former Australian rules footballer who represented Essendon in the Victorian Football League (VFL) and Swan Districts in the West Australian Football League (WAFL) during the 1980s.

Baker started playing senior football quite late by modern standards and was recruited by Swan Districts when he was 24 years old after playing many years of football in the country leagues including Cairnsfor Souths Balaclava in Queensland and South Bunbury in Western Australia. Regarded as a highly skilled and fearless player he slotted easily into the South Bunbury team that Won the 1980 Grand Final with Baker playing on a half forward flank. He then moved to Swan Districts in 1981 and had an immediate impact at the club. Swan Districts went on to win the next two grand finals (1982 and 1983) with Baker playing in the centre and once at full forward. Baker was awarded the 1983 Swan Medal for being the club's fairest and best player.

Essendon Football Club then recruited Baker in 1984 where he played until 1988. A dual premiership player, Baker held down the centreman position in both the 1984 and 1985 grand finals. He came second in the club's fairest and best award for both years. Baker remained with the Bombers until the end of the 1988 season with injuries hampering his career toward the end. Swan Districts named Baker in their team of the century. Baker began coaching after retirement and has coached Gippsland club, Maffra and the Port Douglas Crocodiles in 1993.

In 2025, Baker was named at Number 9 in Don The Stat's Top 100 Essendon Players Since 1980.
