= Peter Bradbury =

Australian rules footballer

Personal information
- Born: 2 July 1958 (age 68)
- Original team: Port Melbourne (VFA)
- Height: 183 cm (6 ft 0 in)
- Weight: 84 kg (185 lb)

Playing career^{1}
Years	Club	Games (Goals)
1983–1986	Essendon	49 (19)
1986–1987	Collingwood	23 (6)
Total		72 (25)
- ^{1} Playing statistics correct to the end of 1987.

Peter Bradbury (born 2 July 1958) is a former Australian rules footballer who played with Essendon and Collingwood in the VFL during the 1980s.

A half-back flanker, Bradbury was a premiership player at Essendon in 1984.

He played in the 1984 Grand Final against Hawthorn.

He missed out on selection in their premiership side the following season and, in 1986, was traded to Collingwood as Essendon needed to make room for Geoff Raines.
