= Tim Watson =

Australian rules footballer (born 1961)

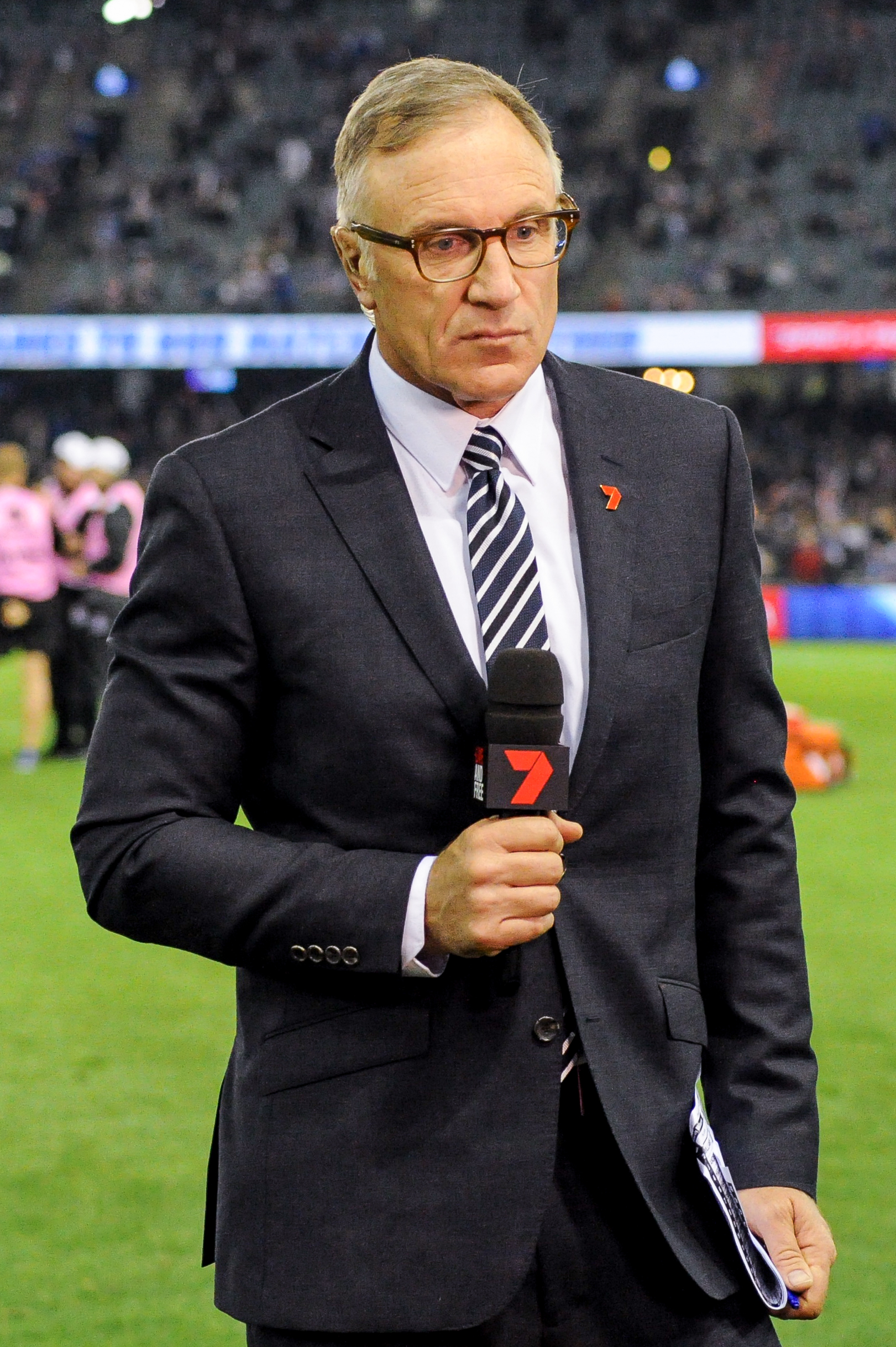
- Watson with Channel 7 in 2017

Personal information
- Full name: Timothy Michael Watson
- Nicknames: Watto, Whispers, The Whisp
- Born: 13 July 1961 (age 65); Dimboola, Victoria, Australia
- Original team: Dimboola
- Height: 185 cm (6 ft 1 in)
- Weight: 96 kg (212 lb)
- Positions: Half-forward flank, ruck-rover

Playing career^{1}
Years	Club	Games (Goals)
1977–1991	Essendon	282 (307)
1992	West Coast	0 (0)
1993–1994	Essendon	25 (28)
Total		307 (335)

Representative team honours^{2}
Years	Team	Games (Goals)
1983–1991	Victoria	12 (76)

Coaching career^{3}
Years	Club	Games (W–L–D)
1999–2000	St Kilda	44 (12–31–1)
- ^{1} Playing statistics correct to the end of 1994.^{2} Representative statistics correct as of 1985.^{3} Coaching statistics correct as of 2000.

Career highlights
- 3× VFL/AFL Premiership: 1984, 1985, 1993; VFLPA MVP (Leigh Matthews Trophy): 1989; 4× Essendon Best & Fairest: 1980, 1985, 1988, 1989; 2 x VFL Team of the Year: 1983, 1989; Essendon captain: 1989–1991; AFC Night Series Premiership 1981, 1984; Australian Football Hall of Fame; Essendon Team of the Century (Ruck Rover); Champions of Essendon: #6

Timothy Michael Watson (born 13 July 1961) is a former AFL player for Essendon & West Coast, former senior coach for St Kilda and current broadcaster for more than 30 years, with the Seven Network from 1992–2024 & 1116 SEN radio.

After retiring from the game, he also continued working in the Australian football industry as a coach.

Watson was the fourth-youngest player ever to play in the VFL/AFL competition and made a comeback after retirement which included another premiership.

Watson has been a prominent and popular sports journalist and media personality.

== Playing career ==
=== Essendon ===
Watson made his VFL debut in 1977 for Essendon at the age of fifteen years and 305 days, the fourth-youngest player in the history of the League.

Watson won the Essendon best-and-fairest award four times (1980, 1985, 1988 and 1989). In 1989, he won the AFL Players Association MVP award, now known as the Leigh Matthews Trophy.

Watson played the ruck-rover in Essendon's 1984 and 1985 grand final victories. He was made captain in 1989 and held that position until 1991, before retiring from the game due to the injury problems that had plagued the later part of his career. In the 1992 pre-season draft, Watson was recruited by the West Coast Eagles even though he had signalled his intention to retire. He never played a game for the club, instead continuing a commentary role with the Seven Network for 1992, which included working as a boundary rider in that year's grand final, which the Eagles won.

==== Comeback ====
Early in the 1993 season, Essendon senior coach Kevin Sheedy lured Watson out of retirement. Although Watson was not as fit as he had once been, and was never able to recapture his top form, he played a vital role in the forward line, kicking some important goals throughout the year. His experience in what was a very young team was instrumental in helping Essendon win an unexpected premiership that year.

After the 1994 season, Watson retired for good as a player, having played 307 games and kicked 335 goals for Essendon. He was also a member of Essendon's 1984, 1985 and 1993 premiership teams.

Since his retirement, Watson was named the sixth-greatest player to ever play for Essendon in the "Champions of Essendon" list, and he was named ruck-rover in their "Team of the Century".

== Coaching career ==
=== St Kilda Football Club senior coach (1999–2000) ===
Watson became senior coach of the St Kilda Football Club, when he replaced Stan Alves, after Alves was sacked at the end of the 1998 season. Watson was then the senior coach of the St Kilda Football Club in the 1999 season and the 2000 season. His success was limited, with the side winning only 12 of the 44 matches they played while he was in charge, including drawing once and losing 31, bringing the winning percentage to 27 percent. In the 1999 season, St Kilda finished tenth on the ladder with ten wins and twelve losses. In the 2000 season, St Kilda won only two games for the entire season, with one draw and 19 losses, where they finished 16th (last on the ladder) for the wooden spoon, and Watson resigned during the middle of the 2000 season, where he would step down at season's end, forgoing the final year of his three-year contract. Watson was then replaced by Malcolm Blight as St Kilda Football Club senior coach.

== Statistics ==
=== Playing statistics ===
Legend
G	Goals	K	Kicks	D	Disposals	T	Tackles
B	Behinds	H	Handballs	M	Marks

Season	Team	No.	Games	Totals							Averages (per game)						
Season	Team	No.	Games	G	B	K	H	D	M	T	G	B	K	H	D	M	T
1977	Essendon	32	16	16	10	136	69	205	36	—N/a	1.0	0.7	8.5	4.3	12.8	2.3	—N/a
1978	Essendon	32	19	11	8	162	94	256	40	—N/a	0.6	0.4	8.5	4.9	13.5	2.1	—N/a
1979	Essendon	32	23	34	27	223	111	334	82	—N/a	1.5	1.2	9.7	4.8	14.5	3.6	—N/a
1980	Essendon	32	22	42	25	337	199	536	94	—N/a	1.9	1.1	15.3	9.0	24.4	4.3	—N/a
1981	Essendon	32	17	15	21	246	111	357	52	—N/a	0.9	1.2	14.5	6.5	21.0	3.1	—N/a
1982	Essendon	32	22	24	31	384	153	537	85	—N/a	1.1	1.4	17.5	7.0	24.4	3.9	—N/a
1983	Essendon	32	26	27	20	442	171	613	115	—N/a	1.0	0.8	17.0	6.6	23.6	4.4	—N/a
1984†	Essendon	32	22	25	22	327	142	469	118	—N/a	1.1	1.0	14.9	6.5	21.3	5.4	—N/a
1985†	Essendon	32	24	27	25	352	183	535	99	—N/a	1.1	1.0	14.7	7.6	22.3	4.1	—N/a
1986	Essendon	32	3	0	2	40	26	66	6	—N/a	0.0	0.7	13.3	8.7	22.0	2.0	—N/a
1987	Essendon	32	7	5	8	84	29	113	18	13	0.7	1.1	12.0	4.1	16.1	2.6	1.9
1988	Essendon	32	19	24	17	300	136	436	92	22	1.3	0.9	15.8	7.2	22.9	4.8	1.2
1989	Essendon	32	24	23	15	334	205	539	99	39	1.0	0.6	13.9	8.5	22.5	4.1	1.6
1990	Essendon	32	21	19	21	262	156	418	93	26	0.9	1.0	12.5	7.4	19.9	4.4	1.2
1991	Essendon	32	17	15	13	192	139	331	65	13	0.9	0.8	11.3	8.2	19.5	3.8	0.8
1992	West Coast	33	0	—	—	—	—	—	—	—	—	—	—	—	—	—	—
1993†	Essendon	32	16	26	11	154	101	255	58	26	1.6	0.7	9.6	6.3	15.9	3.6	1.6
1994	Essendon	32	9	2	0	65	35	100	24	12	0.2	0.0	7.2	3.9	11.1	2.7	1.3
Career			307	335	276	4040	2060	6100	1176	151	1.1	0.9	13.2	6.7	19.9	3.8	1.3

=== Coaching statistics ===
Legend
W	Wins	L	Losses	D	Draws	W%	Winning percentage	LP	Ladder position	LT	League teams

Season	Team	Games	W	L	D	W %	LP	LT
1999	St Kilda	22	10	12	0	45.5%	10	16
2000	St Kilda	22	2	19	1	11.4%	16	16
Career totals		44	12	31	1	28.4%		

== Media career ==
Like many past players, Watson has become a media personality, serving as a sports presenter on Seven News in Melbourne as well as having a special comments role on Seven's AFL coverage.

He has also appeared on many football-related TV shows: as a sports columnist in The Age newspaper, and from 2004 until 2013 as a co-host on the Morning Glory show with Andrew Maher on Melbourne radio station 1116 SEN.

In November 2013, Watson resigned from 1116 SEN to spend more time at the Seven Network; it was later announced that he would replace Sandy Roberts as weeknight sport presenter on Seven News in Melbourne. In 2015, Watson returned to the breakfast shift at 1116 SEN.

In November 2024, Watson announced his retirement from the Seven Network. Rebecca Maddern has been confirmed as his replacement.

== Personal life ==
During the late 1970s, Watson's older brother Larry also played at Essendon as well as Fitzroy before moving to Adelaide to play with West Adelaide in 1981, going on to win the SANFL premiership with Wests in 1983.

In 1993, Watson was named 'Victorian Father of the Year'. In the 2002 National Draft, his son, Jobe Watson, was drafted by Essendon under the father–son rule. Tim and Jobe were both coached by Kevin Sheedy. Tim also has a younger brother Rick who currently lives in Tocumwal in New South Wales.

Tim is married to Susie Watson; their children include son Jobe and daughters Billie, Tess and Grace.
