= Neil Clarke (Australian footballer) =

Australian rules footballer

Personal information
- Born: 28 August 1957
- Died: 29 March 2003 (aged 45)
- Original team: Ringwood
- Height: 177 cm (5 ft 10 in)
- Weight: 80 kg (176 lb)

Playing career^{1}
Years	Club	Games (Goals)
1977–1987	Essendon	135 (35)
- ^{1} Playing statistics correct to the end of 1987.

Neil 'Nobby' Clarke (28 August 1957 – 29 March 2003) was an Australian rules footballer who played with Essendon in the Victorian Football League (VFL).

A defender, Clarke was also given many tagging roles during his career. He won Essendon's 'Best Clubman' in their premiership year of 1984 and played 135 VFL games. Clarke had been known to have been suffering from depression.
