= Peter Landy =

Australian television presenter and sports commentator

Peter Landy (born 1943) is an Australian retired television presenter and sports broadcaster, best known for his long association with the Seven Network and his extensive commentary of Australian rules football.

== Early life and education ==
Landy was educated at the Jesuit Xavier College in Melbourne. He was a passionate supporter of the Hawthorn Football Club from his youth, an interest that originally sparked his connection to the sport.

== Broadcasting career ==
Landy began his broadcasting career in the early 1960s at Radio 3UL in Warragul, where he coordinated horse racing and football broadcasts. He subsequently moved to Melbourne's 3UZ in 1966 as a midnight-dawn presenter before taking on roles as a reporter and news presenter. In 1967, Landy joined 3AK and transitioned into television with GTV-9 in Melbourne.

In 1971, Landy moved to the Seven Network in Melbourne, where he established himself as a prominent sports reporter and commentator. He was widely regarded as a legendary voice in Australian football, known for his unflappable presence and descriptive storytelling. Landy commentated nine consecutive VFL Grand Finals for Seven from 1978 to 1986, working closely alongside fellow commentators Lou Richards and Bob Skilton. He later served as the primary host of Seven's 1988 VFL Grand Final broadcast.

Beyond Australian rules football, Landy was a versatile broadcaster who called tennis, boxing, and several Olympic Games, with a particular focus on rowing events. In the early 1980s, he helped introduce Australian rules football to American audiences by hosting customised broadcast shows for ESPN, explaining the sport's rules and nuances.

During the 1990s, Landy returned to commentary and hosting duties with the Seven Network, presenting football coverage and working as a newsreader. He later appeared on the Nine Network as a boxing commentator during the 2006 Commonwealth Games in Melbourne.

== Personal life ==
Landy was a competitive athlete in his own right, actively participating in rowing and long-distance running. Outside of sports, his hobbies have included playing jazz on the clarinet and saxophone, as well as restoring vintage automobiles.
