= Richard Loveridge =

Australian rules footballer (born 1963)

Personal information
- Born: 15 January 1963 (age 63); Brisbane, Queensland
- Original team: Scotch College
- Height: 178 cm (5 ft 10 in)
- Weight: 70 kg (154 lb)

Playing career^{1}
Years	Club	Games (Goals)
1982–1989	Hawthorn	136 (119)
- ^{1} Playing statistics correct to the end of 1989.

Richard Loveridge (born 15 January 1963) is a former Australian rules footballer who played with Hawthorn in the Victorian Football League (VFL) during the 1980s.

Playing as a rover who was handy near goals, Loveridge was a regular member of the Hawthorn side and was a premiership player in 1983 and 1986. The 1986 VFL season was Loveridge's best; he kicked a career-high 26 goals and finished tenth in the Brownlow Medal count. At the end of the 1989 VFL season, he announced his retirement from football.

Loveridge is a lawyer, having studied at the University of Melbourne. He is a partner of Herbert Smith Freehills, and has served as a member of the AFL Tribunal for more than ten years.

In October 2020, Loveridge was appointed as Chair of the Ormond College Council.

Loveridge is a keen surfer. In 1999 he wrote a surfing guide, Surfing Victoria: The Ultimate Guide.
