= Kevin Walsh (Australian rules footballer) =

Australian rules footballer

Personal information
- Born: 9 February 1962 (age 64)
- Original team: North Ringwood
- Height: 195 cm (6 ft 5 in)
- Weight: 92 kg (203 lb)

Playing career^{1}
Years	Club	Games (Goals)
1981–1991	Essendon	162 (20)
- ^{1} Playing statistics correct to the end of 1991.

Kevin Walsh (born 9 February 1962) is a former Australian rules footballer who played with Essendon in the VFL during the 1980s.

A centre half back, Walsh was a dual premiership player with Essendon in 1984 and 1985. He also played in their losing 1983 grand final. He won an E. J. Whitten Medal in 1986 for his performance for Victoria in a State of Origin game against South Australia. He also earned All Australian selection for his efforts. Walsh earned life membership at Essendon Football Club in 1992.
