= Darren Williams (Australian footballer) =

Australian rules footballer

Personal information
- Born: 13 October 1960 (age 66)
- Original team: Vermont
- Height: 185 cm (6 ft 1 in)
- Weight: 76 kg (168 lb)

Playing career^{1}
Years	Club	Games (Goals)
1979, 1983–89	Essendon	109 (94)
- ^{1} Playing statistics correct to the end of 1989.

Darren Williams (born 13 October 1960) is a former Australian rules footballer who played with Essendon in the VFL during the 1980s.

After winning a Morrish Medal for his performance for Essendon in the under-19s, he made his senior debut in 1979. At the season's end he went to Western Australia where he played with East Fremantle and didn't return to Essendon until 1983. A rover, Williams was a premiership player in 1984 and 1985, also representing Victoria in both seasons.
