= Garry Foulds =

Australian rules footballer

Personal information
- Born: 13 May 1956 (age 70)
- Original team: St Bernards / West Essendon
- Debut: Round 8, 1974, Essendon vs. Fitzroy, at Lake Oval
- Height: 188 cm (6 ft 2 in)
- Weight: 78 kg (172 lb)
- Position: Utility

Playing career^{1}
Years	Club	Games (Goals)
1974–1989	Essendon	300 (140)
- ^{1} Playing statistics correct to the end of 1989.

Garry Foulds (born 13 May 1956) is a former Australian rules footballer who played 300 games for the Essendon Football Club between 1974 and 1989. Described as "a ball magnet", Foulds spent the majority of his career playing on the wing or floating across the half-back line. He made his Victorian Football League (VFL) debut against Fitzroy in round 8 1974, after playing in the Essendon under–19s. He struggled to hold his place in the side before becoming a regular in 1977. Foulds was part of Essendon's Grand Final winning sides over Hawthorn in 1984 and 1985, along with playing in the 1983 Grand Final loss against the same opposition.

== Biography ==
While he attended St Bernard's College [college of fellow VFL/AFL 300 gamers, Simon and Justin Madden in Melbourne, Foulds played with West Essendon juniors in the Essendon District Football League. Then Essendon senior Victorian Football League [now AFL] captain, Des Tuddenham convinced Foulds to train with Essendon. "I was playing under-17s at the time and had just got home from training. My brother told me Des Tuddenham was at the door but I didn't believe him so I didn't bother to check. He came again and said he was waiting for me — I thought I would play along and went out to check and got the biggest shock of my life," Foulds said. By the end of the week he was training with Essendon and was playing in the under–19s.

He spent two years playing reserves and under–19s football before he made his senior debut in round 8 1974, against Fitzroy at Lake Oval. He struggled to hold his place in the side in the coming seasons, until he had a breakout season in 1977. The year saw him often win the ball across half-back or the midfield. Some experts said that Foulds would often have an "uncanny ability to be in the right play at the right time," and was a "dangerous player when he had the ball." His teammate Robert Shaw said that Foulds had "one of the best kicks you would ever see. He was over six feet tall and had real pace so he could carry the ball." In response, Foulds said: "I just used to try and sum up situations and if I thought my opponent was running to the wrong place I would go the other way." His last Australia Football League [AFL] coach Kevin Sheedy, was full of praise for Foulds: "He was a very accomplished footballer. I put him to full-forward and against Richmond in 1981 and he kicked seven goals on Francis Bourke," Sheedy said. "He was a very smart footballer — not a crash and bang type of player but very calculating. He was unselfish, a good team man."

Despite being only one of five players to play 300 matches for the Essendon Football Club, Foulds says the 1984 Grand Final victory over Hawthorn was "probably his greatest memory," and was "more satisfying than playing 300 games." Commenting further on the 1984 victory he said: "After being at Essendon for 10 years, it was a pretty big achievement to know that we had won a Grand Final." Foulds was also a part of Essendon's 1983 Grand Final loss to Hawthorn and their 1985 victory over the same opposition.

Though Foulds played 300 games, he was not an iconic figure at the club. "When I played at Essendon I wasn't in the media much and it suited me and enabled me to concentrate on football. I was happy playing the game. I enjoyed playing and the people I played with and the friends I made out of football," said Foulds.

In 2025, Garry Foulds was named at Number 23 in Don The Stat's Top 100 Essendon Players Since 1980.
