= Alan Ezard =

Australian rules footballer, born 1963

Personal information
- Nickname: Alan Ezard
- Born: 15 April 1963 (age 63); Broadford, Victoria
- Original team: Broadford/Coburg
- Height: 173 cm (5 ft 8 in)
- Weight: 68 kg (150 lb)
- Positions: Forward pocket, rover

Playing career^{1}
| Years | Club | Games (Goals) |
| 1983–1993 | Essendon | 184 (200) |

Representative team honours^{2}
| Years | Team | Games (Goals) |
| 1985–1991 | Victoria | 3 (?) |
- ^{1} Playing statistics correct to the end of 1993.^{2} Representative statistics correct as of 1991.

Career highlights
- Essendon best and fairest, 1991; Premiership player, 1984, 1985; EJ Whitten Medal, 1991; Essendon leading goalkicker, 1986

Alan Ezard (born 15 April 1963) is a former Australian rules footballer who played in the VFL/AFL. Nicknamed 'The Lizard', he played 184 games for 200 goals, retiring in 1993.

Originally from Broadford, Victoria, Ezard made his debut with the Essendon Football Club in 1983 and made a name for himself as a very strong mark for a 173 cm man, playing mostly in the forward pocket or as a rover. He played numerous State of Origin games for Victoria, winning an EJ Whitten Medal in the 1991 match against South Australia. Ezard was Essendon's leading goalkicker in 1986 and won the club's best and fairest in 1991. He also played in four Grand Finals (1983, 1984, 1985, 1990), the second and third of which were premiership wins.

Ezard has a nephew, James, who played for the Port Adelaide Football Club in the mid-2000s and won the SANFL's highest individual honour in 2009, the Magarey Medal playing for West Adelaide.

In 2007 Ezard was the senior coach of the Pascoe Vale Football Club in the Essendon District Football League. Ezard coached Hoppers Crossing Football Club in the Western Region Football League in season 2010 and has been appointed senior coach of Hillside Football Club for season 2012. Ezard was appointed senior coach of the La Trobe University Football Club in 2015.
