= 1984 VFL season =

88th season of the Victorian Football League (VFL)

1984 VFL premiership season
- Teams: 12
- Premiers: Essendon; 13th premiership
- Minor premiers: Essendon; 11th minor premiership
- Night series: Essendon; 2nd Night series win
- Brownlow Medallist: Peter Moore; Melbourne (24 votes)
- Coleman Medallist: Bernie Quinlan; Fitzroy (104 goals)

Attendance
- Matches played: 138
- Total attendance: 3,394,571 (24,598 per match)
- Highest: 92,685

The 1984 VFL season was the 88th season of the Victorian Football League (VFL), the highest level senior Australian rules football competition in Victoria. The season featured twelve clubs, ran from 31 March until 29 September, and comprised a 22-game home-and-away season followed by a finals series featuring the top five clubs.

The premiership was won by the Essendon Football Club for the 13th time, after it defeated Hawthorn by 24 points in the 1984 VFL Grand Final.

== Night series ==
Essendon defeated Sydney 13.11 (89) to 5.8 (38) in the final.

== Home-and-away season ==
=== Round 1 ===
Home team	Home team score	Away team	Away team score	Venue	Crowd	Date
Hawthorn	17.22 (124)	Sydney	13.11 (89)	Princes Park	13,888	31 March 1984
Footscray	18.14 (122)	Richmond	11.17 (83)	Western Oval	25,013	31 March 1984
Collingwood	18.12 (120)	Melbourne	15.17 (107)	Victoria Park	32,471	31 March 1984
Geelong	23.10 (148)	Fitzroy	15.9 (99)	Kardinia Park	22,260	31 March 1984
St Kilda	14.13 (97)	Essendon	19.20 (134)	Moorabbin Oval	26,019	31 March 1984
North Melbourne	9.8 (62)	Carlton	31.13 (199)	VFL Park	36,504	31 March 1984

=== Round 2 ===
Home team	Home team score	Away team	Away team score	Venue	Crowd	Date
Essendon	16.14 (110)	Hawthorn	17.14 (116)	Windy Hill	23,824	7 April 1984
Collingwood	22.17 (149)	St Kilda	7.14 (56)	Victoria Park	26,647	7 April 1984
Richmond	15.17 (107)	North Melbourne	14.9 (93)	MCG	25,004	7 April 1984
Fitzroy	16.15 (111)	Carlton	18.13 (121)	Junction Oval	22,202	7 April 1984
Geelong	16.9 (105)	Footscray	9.11 (65)	VFL Park	24,114	7 April 1984
Sydney	16.16 (112)	Melbourne	13.20 (98)	SCG	8,131	8 April 1984

=== Round 3 ===
Home team	Home team score	Away team	Away team score	Venue	Crowd	Date
St Kilda	18.8 (116)	Sydney	22.13 (145)	Moorabbin Oval	15,127	14 April 1984
Carlton	15.7 (97)	Geelong	19.12 (126)	Princes Park	27,738	14 April 1984
Melbourne	20.12 (132)	Hawthorn	20.18 (138)	MCG	25,557	14 April 1984
North Melbourne	14.17 (101)	Footscray	25.14 (164)	Arden Street Oval	14,174	14 April 1984
Essendon	26.13 (169)	Collingwood	16.10 (106)	Windy Hill	28,101	14 April 1984
Fitzroy	16.9 (105)	Richmond	22.19 (151)	VFL Park	25,888	14 April 1984

=== Round 4 ===
Home team	Home team score	Away team	Away team score	Venue	Crowd	Date
Collingwood	15.13 (103)	Sydney	17.4 (106)	Victoria Park	22,519	21 April 1984
Richmond	14.13 (97)	Carlton	23.13 (151)	MCG	45,710	21 April 1984
Melbourne	14.7 (91)	Essendon	17.24 (126)	VFL Park	31,535	21 April 1984
Hawthorn	23.21 (159)	St Kilda	14.15 (99)	Princes Park	15,081	23 April 1984
Geelong	9.11 (65)	North Melbourne	11.13 (79)	Kardinia Park	26,574	23 April 1984
Fitzroy	21.14 (140)	Footscray	9.16 (70)	Junction Oval	20,280	23 April 1984

=== Round 5 ===
Home team	Home team score	Away team	Away team score	Venue	Crowd	Date
Richmond	12.14 (86)	Essendon	20.15 (135)	MCG	55,141	25 April 1984
Carlton	9.17 (71)	Collingwood	10.16 (76)	VFL Park	68,082	25 April 1984
Footscray	13.16 (94)	Hawthorn	22.9 (141)	Western Oval	19,988	28 April 1984
North Melbourne	16.17 (113)	Melbourne	14.14 (98)	MCG	23,292	28 April 1984
St Kilda	10.11 (71)	Geelong	15.12 (102)	Moorabbin Oval	16,892	28 April 1984
Sydney	17.17 (119)	Fitzroy	15.14 (104)	SCG	10,967	29 April 1984

=== Round 6 ===
Home team	Home team score	Away team	Away team score	Venue	Crowd	Date
Footscray	11.18 (84)	Sydney	11.11 (77)	Western Oval	15,236	5 May 1984
Collingwood	15.18 (108)	North Melbourne	12.15 (87)	Victoria Park	25,156	5 May 1984
Carlton	15.14 (104)	St Kilda	13.12 (90)	Princes Park	18,513	5 May 1984
Melbourne	23.10 (148)	Geelong	12.13 (85)	MCG	27,685	5 May 1984
Fitzroy	13.15 (93)	Essendon	22.12 (144)	Junction Oval	20,270	5 May 1984
Hawthorn	11.15 (81)	Richmond	17.18 (120)	VFL Park	31,259	5 May 1984

=== Round 7 ===
Home team	Home team score	Away team	Away team score	Venue	Crowd	Date
Essendon	12.10 (82)	Footscray	16.8 (104)	Windy Hill	21,196	12 May 1984
Hawthorn	20.15 (135)	Fitzroy	16.8 (104)	Princes Park	14,189	12 May 1984
Geelong	11.17 (83)	Collingwood	19.14 (128)	Kardinia Park	25,876	12 May 1984
Melbourne	16.9 (105)	Carlton	18.14 (122)	MCG	41,073	12 May 1984
North Melbourne	14.17 (101)	St Kilda	22.16 (148)	VFL Park	18,066	12 May 1984
Sydney	17.20 (122)	Richmond	18.21 (129)	SCG	14,794	13 May 1984

=== Round 8 ===
Home team	Home team score	Away team	Away team score	Venue	Crowd	Date
North Melbourne	18.19 (127)	Sydney	19.20 (134)	Arden Street Oval	10,759	19 May 1984
Fitzroy	12.9 (81)	Melbourne	13.14 (92)	Junction Oval	12,712	19 May 1984
Carlton	12.11 (83)	Hawthorn	23.13 (151)	Princes Park	31,946	19 May 1984
St Kilda	13.11 (89)	Footscray	9.17 (71)	Moorabbin Oval	18,100	19 May 1984
Richmond	15.19 (109)	Collingwood	13.17 (95)	MCG	70,889	19 May 1984
Essendon	19.19 (133)	Geelong	14.6 (90)	VFL Park	39,962	19 May 1984

=== Round 9 ===
Home team	Home team score	Away team	Away team score	Venue	Crowd	Date
Richmond	24.8 (152)	St Kilda	12.16 (88)	MCG	30,402	26 May 1984
Hawthorn	21.17 (143)	North Melbourne	13.8 (86)	Princes Park	12,975	26 May 1984
Collingwood	15.19 (109)	Fitzroy	11.16 (82)	Victoria Park	25,578	26 May 1984
Essendon	16.17 (113)	Carlton	9.12 (66)	Windy Hill	27,312	26 May 1984
Footscray	11.15 (81)	Melbourne	23.21 (159)	VFL Park	20,056	26 May 1984
Sydney	16.15 (111)	Geelong	7.27 (69)	SCG	13,572	27 May 1984

=== Round 10 ===
Home team	Home team score	Away team	Away team score	Venue	Crowd	Date
Melbourne	15.13 (103)	Richmond	11.10 (76)	MCG	43,712	2 June 1984
Geelong	17.11 (113)	Hawthorn	11.19 (85)	Kardinia Park	14,290	2 June 1984
North Melbourne	15.16 (106)	Essendon	16.12 (108)	Arden Street Oval	16,690	2 June 1984
Footscray	15.10 (100)	Collingwood	13.17 (95)	Western Oval	25,618	2 June 1984
St Kilda	11.17 (83)	Fitzroy	22.15 (147)	VFL Park	20,618	2 June 1984
Sydney	12.15 (87)	Carlton	20.19 (139)	SCG	25,062	3 June 1984

=== Round 11 ===
Home team	Home team score	Away team	Away team score	Venue	Crowd	Date
Essendon	20.15 (135)	Sydney	14.10 (94)	Windy Hill	21,739	9 June 1984
St Kilda	13.13 (91)	Melbourne	19.13 (127)	Moorabbin Oval	20,080	9 June 1984
Richmond	16.15 (111)	Geelong	17.21 (123)	MCG	38,183	9 June 1984
Fitzroy	25.16 (166)	North Melbourne	23.14 (152)	Junction Oval	14,607	11 June 1984
Carlton	22.11 (143)	Footscray	16.13 (109)	Princes Park	29,982	11 June 1984
Collingwood	14.8 (92)	Hawthorn	18.16 (124)	VFL Park	62,339	11 June 1984

=== Round 12 ===
Home team	Home team score	Away team	Away team score	Venue	Crowd	Date
North Melbourne	14.10 (94)	Richmond	16.14 (110)	Arden Street Oval	10,242	16 June 1984
Melbourne	21.17 (143)	Sydney	5.16 (46)	MCG	24,871	16 June 1984
Footscray	13.11 (89)	Geelong	10.13 (73)	Western Oval	16,233	16 June 1984
Hawthorn	12.21 (93)	Essendon	6.10 (46)	Princes Park	25,772	16 June 1984
St Kilda	11.6 (72)	Collingwood	11.12 (78)	Moorabbin Oval	17,648	16 June 1984
Carlton	9.13 (67)	Fitzroy	10.12 (72)	VFL Park	24,639	16 June 1984

=== Round 13 ===
Home team	Home team score	Away team	Away team score	Venue	Crowd	Date
Hawthorn	13.12 (90)	Melbourne	15.17 (107)	Princes Park	20,416	23 June 1984
Collingwood	12.17 (89)	Essendon	19.9 (123)	Victoria Park	32,701	23 June 1984
Richmond	11.15 (81)	Fitzroy	14.14 (98)	MCG	26,707	23 June 1984
Geelong	4.17 (41)	Carlton	10.18 (78)	Kardinia Park	21,769	23 June 1984
Footscray	11.11 (77)	North Melbourne	9.8 (62)	VFL Park	12,945	23 June 1984
Sydney	15.11 (101)	St Kilda	19.12 (126)	SCG	10,392	24 June 1984

=== Round 14 ===
Home team	Home team score	Away team	Away team score	Venue	Crowd	Date
Carlton	23.14 (152)	Richmond	4.13 (37)	Princes Park	21,643	30 June 1984
St Kilda	4.6 (30)	Hawthorn	19.20 (134)	Moorabbin Oval	12,523	30 June 1984
North Melbourne	16.11 (107)	Geelong	19.11 (125)	MCG	11,050	30 June 1984
Footscray	13.13 (91)	Fitzroy	11.11 (77)	Western Oval	14,473	30 June 1984
Essendon	14.15 (99)	Melbourne	7.14 (56)	VFL Park	46,753	30 June 1984
Sydney	14.16 (100)	Collingwood	19.17 (131)	SCG	14,917	1 July 1984

=== Round 15 ===
Home team	Home team score	Away team	Away team score	Venue	Crowd	Date
Melbourne	18.9 (117)	North Melbourne	10.14 (74)	MCG	17,204	7 July 1984
Geelong	15.12 (102)	St Kilda	13.11 (89)	Kardinia Park	10,861	7 July 1984
Fitzroy	9.14 (68)	Sydney	14.12 (96)	Junction Oval	8,368	7 July 1984
Essendon	14.10 (94)	Richmond	7.19 (61)	Windy Hill	16,993	7 July 1984
Hawthorn	16.14 (110)	Footscray	10.16 (76)	Princes Park	11,169	7 July 1984
Collingwood	9.16 (70)	Carlton	14.13 (97)	VFL Park	48,218	7 July 1984

=== Round 16 ===
Home team	Home team score	Away team	Away team score	Venue	Crowd	Date
Essendon	20.7 (127)	Fitzroy	9.12 (66)	Windy Hill	17,749	14 July 1984
Richmond	14.13 (97)	Hawthorn	28.17 (185)	VFL Park	27,274	14 July 1984
Sydney	16.17 (113)	Footscray	12.15 (87)	SCG	10,644	15 July 1984
Geelong	20.10 (130)	Melbourne	15.18 (108)	Kardinia Park	21,448	21 July 1984
North Melbourne	14.17 (101)	Collingwood	21.20 (146)	MCG	27,181	21 July 1984
St Kilda	16.9 (105)	Carlton	13.6 (84)	Moorabbin Oval	17,102	21 July 1984

=== Round 17 ===
Home team	Home team score	Away team	Away team score	Venue	Crowd	Date
Richmond	12.19 (91)	Sydney	3.10 (28)	MCG	13,041	28 July 1984
Fitzroy	11.11 (77)	Hawthorn	10.7 (67)	Junction Oval	6,920	28 July 1984
Collingwood	6.19 (55)	Geelong	4.5 (29)	Victoria Park	22,306	28 July 1984
Carlton	7.10 (52)	Melbourne	3.8 (26)	Princes Park	17,847	28 July 1984
Footscray	3.14 (32)	Essendon	4.10 (34)	Western Oval	16,771	28 July 1984
St Kilda	5.12 (42)	North Melbourne	5.14 (44)	VFL Park	12,643	28 July 1984

=== Round 18 ===
Home team	Home team score	Away team	Away team score	Venue	Crowd	Date
Footscray	16.16 (112)	St Kilda	11.13 (79)	Western Oval	13,356	4 August 1984
Collingwood	19.14 (128)	Richmond	12.20 (92)	Victoria Park	24,067	4 August 1984
Melbourne	17.18 (120)	Fitzroy	22.20 (152)	MCG	20,236	4 August 1984
Hawthorn	21.14 (140)	Carlton	16.12 (108)	Princes Park	23,968	4 August 1984
Geelong	12.17 (89)	Essendon	19.22 (136)	VFL Park	31,675	4 August 1984
Sydney	17.6 (108)	North Melbourne	18.15 (123)	SCG	8,538	5 August 1984

=== Round 19 ===
Home team	Home team score	Away team	Away team score	Venue	Crowd	Date
Geelong	16.17 (113)	Sydney	14.8 (92)	Kardinia Park	10,752	11 August 1984
Carlton	12.18 (90)	Essendon	15.12 (102)	Princes Park	26,863	11 August 1984
St Kilda	11.15 (81)	Richmond	10.14 (74)	Moorabbin Oval	11,025	11 August 1984
North Melbourne	17.20 (122)	Hawthorn	7.9 (51)	Arden Street Oval	8,274	11 August 1984
Melbourne	15.13 (103)	Footscray	20.15 (135)	MCG	18,019	11 August 1984
Fitzroy	14.19 (103)	Collingwood	9.7 (61)	VFL Park	25,656	11 August 1984

=== Round 20 ===
Home team	Home team score	Away team	Away team score	Venue	Crowd	Date
Fitzroy	20.11 (131)	Geelong	14.9 (93)	Junction Oval	9,518	18 August 1984
Essendon	22.6 (138)	St Kilda	13.5 (83)	Windy Hill	13,882	18 August 1984
Carlton	16.15 (111)	North Melbourne	14.14 (98)	Princes Park	15,463	18 August 1984
Melbourne	9.17 (71)	Collingwood	15.13 (103)	MCG	31,847	18 August 1984
Richmond	12.13 (85)	Footscray	9.11 (65)	VFL Park	13,013	18 August 1984
Sydney	11.19 (85)	Hawthorn	25.24 (174)	SCG	8,276	19 August 1984

=== Round 21 ===
Home team	Home team score	Away team	Away team score	Venue	Crowd	Date
Geelong	14.29 (113)	Richmond	9.9 (63)	Kardinia Park	15,926	25 August 1984
North Melbourne	15.21 (111)	Fitzroy	26.9 (165)	MCG	20,086	25 August 1984
Hawthorn	16.23 (119)	Collingwood	15.14 (104)	Princes Park	22,031	25 August 1984
Footscray	14.9 (93)	Carlton	7.16 (58)	Western Oval	20,890	25 August 1984
Melbourne	14.16 (100)	St Kilda	9.8 (62)	VFL Park	14,079	25 August 1984
Sydney	23.17 (155)	Essendon	14.15 (99)	SCG	12,173	26 August 1984

=== Round 22 ===
Home team	Home team score	Away team	Away team score	Venue	Crowd	Date
Fitzroy	24.20 (164)	St Kilda	15.17 (107)	Junction Oval	15,156	1 September 1984
Essendon	27.7 (169)	North Melbourne	19.17 (131)	Windy Hill	21,002	1 September 1984
Collingwood	16.18 (114)	Footscray	9.17 (71)	Victoria Park	32,023	1 September 1984
Carlton	20.19 (139)	Sydney	15.13 (103)	Princes Park	20,319	1 September 1984
Richmond	21.19 (145)	Melbourne	18.9 (117)	MCG	21,565	1 September 1984
Hawthorn	25.14 (164)	Geelong	14.11 (95)	VFL Park	31,609	1 September 1984

== Ladder ==
(P)	Premiers
	Qualified for finals

#	Team	P	W	L	D	PF	PA	%	Pts
1	Essendon (P)	22	18	4	0	2556	1994	128.2	72
2	Hawthorn	22	17	5	0	2724	2069	131.7	68
3	Carlton	22	13	9	0	2332	2014	115.8	52
4	Collingwood	22	13	9	0	2260	2072	109.1	52
5	Fitzroy	22	11	11	0	2405	2345	102.6	44
6	Geelong	22	11	11	0	2112	2239	94.3	44
7	Footscray	22	11	11	0	1992	2123	93.8	44
8	Richmond	22	10	12	0	2157	2373	90.9	40
9	Melbourne	22	9	13	0	2328	2233	104.3	36
10	Sydney	22	9	13	0	2223	2522	88.1	36
11	North Melbourne	22	5	17	0	2174	2661	81.7	20
12	St Kilda	22	5	17	0	1904	2522	75.5	20

Rules for classification: 1. premiership points; 2. percentage; 3. points for
Average score: 102.9
Source: AFL Tables

== Finals series ==
=== Finals week 1 ===
	Qualifying final
Saturday, 8 September (2:30 pm)	Hawthorn 18.14 (122)	def.	Carlton 13.14 (92)	VFL Park (crowd: 55,947)	Report

	Elimination final
Sunday, 9 September (2:30 pm)	Collingwood 23.15 (153)	def.	Fitzroy 15.17 (107)	MCG (crowd: 73,994)	Report

=== Finals week 2 ===
	Semi-finals
SF1: Saturday, 15 September (2:30 pm)	Carlton 14.9 (93)	def. by	Collingwood 17.16 (118)	VFL Park (crowd: 70,634)	Report
SF2: Sunday, 16 September (2:30 pm)	Essendon 15.15 (105)	def. by	Hawthorn 16.17 (113)	MCG (crowd: 76,514)	Report

=== Preliminary final ===
	Preliminary final
Saturday, 22 September (2:30 pm)	Essendon 28.6 (174)	def.	Collingwood 5.11 (41)	VFL Park (crowd: 73,550)	Report
Essendon' 133-point victory is the biggest win in a VFL/AFL final.

=== Grand final ===
	Grand final
Saturday, 29 September (2:50 pm)	Essendon 14.21 (105)	def.	Hawthorn 12.9 (81)	MCG (crowd: 92,685)	Report
This was the second consecutive Grand final featuring Hawthorn and Essendon.; The Bombers won their first VFL premiership in 19 years. Their last quarter score of 9.6 (60) was a Grand final record until surpassed the following year.; Kevin Sheedy won his first Jock McHale Medal.

== Season notes ==
- Fitzroy became the only side to make the finals after winning only one of its first nine games, until Carlton achieved the same feat in 2026.
- Essendon's 133-point win over Collingwood in the Preliminary Final is the largest win in any VFL/AFL final and the first 100-point loss by Collingwood since 1943 when they were depleted by war.
- In Round 17, shocking weather saw the lowest aggregate score for a round since 1961, with a combined total of only 577 points or an approximate average score of 6.12 (48).

== Awards ==
- The Brownlow Medal was awarded to Peter Moore of Melbourne.
- The Coleman Medal was awarded to Bernie Quinlan of Fitzroy.
- The VFL Players Association MVP Award, now known as the Leigh Matthews Trophy, was awarded to Russell Greene of Hawthorn.
- The Norm Smith Medal was awarded to Billy Duckworth of Essendon.
- The wooden spoon was "awarded" to St Kilda.
- North Melbourne 17.19 (121) defeated Richmond 7.11 (53) in the under 19's grand final, held as a curtain-raiser to the Reserves Grand final on 29 September at the Melbourne Cricket Ground.
- Melbourne 11.15 (81) defeated Carlton 6.9 (45) in the Reserves Grand final, held as a curtain-raiser to the grand final on 29 September at the Melbourne Cricket Ground.

== Sources ==
- 1984 VFL season at AFL Tables
- 1984 VFL season at Australian Football
