= 1985 VFL finals series =

1985 premiership season
- Date: 7–28 September 1985
- Teams: 5
- Premiers: Essendon (14th premiership)
- Runners-up: Hawthorn (9th grand final)
- Minor premiers: Essendon (12th minor premiership)

Attendance
- Matches played: 6
- Total attendance: 385,589 (64,265 per match)
- Highest: 100,042 (Grand Final, Essendon vs. Hawthorn)

The 1985 Victorian Football League finals series was the 89th annual edition of the VFL/AFL final series, the Australian rules football tournament staged to determine the winner of the 1985 VFL Premiership season. The series ran over four weekends in September 1985, culminating with the 1985 VFL Grand Final at the Melbourne Cricket Ground on 28 September 1985.

The top five teams from the 1985 VFL Premiership season qualified for the finals series, which was played using the McIntyre final five system.

== Matches ==
The system used for the 1985 VFL finals series was the McIntyre final five system, which had been used continuously by the VFL since 1972.

=== Week one (qualifying and elimination finals) ===
==== Elimination final (Carlton vs North Melbourne) ====
The opening match of the 1985 VFL finals series saw fourth-placed Carlton host fifth-placed North Melbourne in the elimination final at VFL Park. This marked the sixth final between the two sides, having previously met in the second semi-final in 1979.

Scorecard

Elimination final
Saturday, 7 September (8:10pm)	Carlton	def. by	North Melbourne	VFL Park (crowd: 49,126)	Report
3.6 (24); 10.10 (70); 14.10 (94); 16.11 (107)	Q1; Q2; Q3; Final	2.3 (15); 6.3 (39); 12.5 (77); 20.6 (126)	Umpires: Cameron, Robinson; Television broadcast: Seven Network
Maclure 3 Harmes 2 Madden 1	Goals	4 McCann; 3 Glendinning; 2 Schimmelbusch, Demetriou; 1 Jonas
Madden, Maclure, Marcou, Johnston	Best	Holt, Larkin, Schimmelbusch
Blackwell (bruised ankle)	Injuries	P Krakouer (bruised thigh), Ramsey (bruised thigh), Demetriou (bruised jaw)
Nil	Reports	Demetriou (striking), McDonald (striking)

==== Qualifying final (Footscray vs Hawthorn) ====
The Qualifying final saw second-placed Footscray host Hawthorn at the MCG. This marked the second VFL final between the two sides - having previously met in the 1961 VFL Grand Final, which was won by Hawthorn. The Bulldogs were playing in their first VFL finals series since 1976.

===== Teams =====
The line-ups below were as published in The Football Record.

Footscray
B:	3 Mark Kellett	8 Rick Kennedy	45 Michael Ford
HB:	49 Brian Cordy	32 Peter Foster	4 Brad Hardie
C:	51 Michael McLean	24 Stephen Wallis	7 Doug Hawkins
HF:	20 Jim Edmond (c)	37 Neil Peart	27 Stephen MacPherson
F:	21 Tony Buhagiar	18 Simon Beasley	9 Les Bamblett
Foll:	1 Andrew Purser	17 Phil Maylin	33 Brian Royal
Int:	2 Jim Sewell	11 Allen Daniels	43 Rod MacPherson
Int:	14 Robert Groenewegen	29 Neil Cordy	
Coach:	Michael Malthouse		

Hawthorn
B:	7 Gary Ayres	2 Chris Mew	29 Russell Greene
HB:	15 Russell Morris	6 Rod Lester-Smith	30 Peter Schwab
C:	9 Robert DiPierdomenico	16 Terry Wallace	4 Peter Russo
HF:	34 John Kennedy	23 Dermott Brereton	11 Gary Buckenara
F:	28 Chris Langford	19 Jason Dunstall	3 Leigh Matthews(c)
Foll:	21 Michael Byrne	37 Robert Handley	22 Richard Loveridge
Int:	25 Peter Curran	39 Paul Abbott	
Coach:	Allan Jeans		

Footscray made no late changes to the starting line-up, selecting Allen Daniels and Jim Sewell as the interchange players. Hawthorn also made no changes to the starting line-up, but replaced the named interchange players - Paul Abbott and Peter Curran- with emergencies Rodney Eade and Colin Robertson.

===== Match Summary =====
Scorecard

Qualifying final
Sunday, 8 September (2:30pm)	Footscray	def. by	Hawthorn	MCG (crowd: 58,367)	Report
2.3 (15); 3.5 (23); 6.11 (47); 8.14 (62)	Q1; Q2; Q3; Final	6.5 (41); 11.11 (77); 15.16 (106); 22.23 (155)	Umpires: Sawers, Howlett; Television broadcast: Seven Network
Bamblett, Beasley 2 Edmond, S MacPherson, Royal, Peart 1	Goals	5 Dunstall; 3 Byrne, Brereton; 2 Matthews; 1 Buckenara
Hardie, Bamblett, Hawkins, Wallis, Royal	Best	Wallace, Lester-Smith, Morris, Greene, Mew, Langford, Dunstall
Daniels (strained ankle)	Injuries	DiPierdomenico (calf)
Nil	Reports	Nil

=== Week two (semi-finals) ===
==== First semi-final (Footscray vs North Melbourne) ====
The first semi-final saw Footscray host North Melbourne at the MCG. This was the first meeting between the two clubs in a VFL final.

===== Teams =====
The line-ups below were as published in The Football Record.

Footscray
B:	4 Brad Hardie	8 Rick Kennedy	45 Michael Ford
HB:	49 Brian Cordy	32 Peter Foster	3 Mark Kellett
C:	17 Phil Maylin	24 Stephen Wallis	7 Doug Hawkins
HF:	51 Michael McLean	37 Neil Peart	9 Les Bamblett
F:	21 Tony Buhagiar	18 Simon Beasley	20 Jim Edmond (c)
Foll:	1 Andrew Purser	11 Allen Daniels	33 Brian Royal
Int:	2 Jim Sewell	27 Stephen MacPherson	43 Rod MacPherson
Int:	14 Robert Groenewegen	29 Neil Cordy	
Coach:	Michael Malthouse		

North Melbourne
B:	30 Roy Ramsay	16 Stephen McCann	49 Darren Crocker
HB:	27 Keith Greig	13 John Law	15 Ross Smith
C:	28 Andrew Demetriou	7 Darren Steele	2 John Holt
HF:	45 Peter Jonas	4 Ross Glendinning	20 Wayne Schimmelbusch (c)
F:	48 Mark Arceri	6 Ian Fairley	8 Phil Krakouer
Foll:	25 Donald McDonald	9 Matthew Larkin	3 Jim Krakouer
Int:	56 Paul Spargo	37 Michael Passmore	29 Peter German
Int:	17 Kym Hodgeman	32 David Dwyer	
Coach:	John Kennedy		

North suffered a major blow before the game when captain Wayne Schimmelbusch was omitted after failing to recover from a torn thigh muscle in time, and ended up being replaced by Kym Hodgeman, with Paul Spargo and David Dwyer being confirmed as the interchange players. Footscray also made one change to its line-up, omitting Neil Peart and replacing him with Jim Sewell. Robert Groenewegen and Stephen MacPherson were the confirmed interchange players.

===== Match Summary =====
Under pressure against a North Melbourne team buzzing from its come-from-behind win against Carlton in the elimination final, the Bulldogs responded after their previous week's Qualifying final thrashing to end the Kangaroos' season and record their first VFL final victory since 1961.

The loss of Schimmelbusch was somewhat mitigated by the return of suspended rover Jim Krakouer, who ended up being among North's best players. The first half was filled with free-flowing and vigorous play, as both sides traded goals. By mid-way through the first quarter, Footscray were down two players when Ford and Kellett came off injured within minutes of each other; the former when he was met solidly by Larkin and was stretchered off with concussion, and the latter when he came off the ground with suspected cruciate ligament damage. Despite this, the Bulldogs managed to go into half-time with a three-point lead. The game up to this point had been characterized by swings of momentum as one team would kick a string of goals in a few minutes, then the other would do the same.

The critical period of the game occurred early in the third quarter, starting at the five-minute mark when Beasley, who had comprehensively outplayed his opponent Fairley, took a superb pack mark. From the set shot, he slotted his fifth to bring up his 100th goal of the season, to the delight of fans and teammates. Then a minute later Daniels, a much-improved player from the previous week, smothered an attempted clearing kick from North defender Law and snapped his second goal. Further goals from Bamblett, Beasley and Royal capped off a ten-minute purple patch for Footscray that pushed the lead out beyond 30 points

After the game Bulldogs coach Michael Malthouse expressed his delight with his team's turnaround in form:

Last week the guys were genuinely embarrassed and they were out today to make amends. We don't want to over emphasise revenge but we will be thinking about Hawthorn and just try to do the right things. [... The players] realise that finals are more intense. The sides that win finals are played by guys who want to do it together. Next week will be a different game at a different venue. We have six days to analyse what we will do.

Scorecard

First semi-final
Sunday, 15 September (2:30pm)	Footscray	def.	North Melbourne	MCG (crowd: 56,112)	Report
3.1 (19); 9.8 (62); 14.16 (100); 19.23 (137)	Q1; Q2; Q3; Final	4.3 (27); 9.5 (59); 11.9 (75); 16.11 (107)	Umpires: James, Robinson; Television broadcast: Seven Network
Beasley 7 Royal 5 Daniels, Edmond 2 Hawkins, Bamblett, Buhagiar 1	Goals	3 J Krakouer; 2 Glendinning, Larkin, Holt; 1 P Krakouer, McCann, Demetriou, Jonas, Arceri, Spargo, Fairley
Hawkins, Wallis, Royal, Maylin, Foster, B Cordy, Daniels	Best	Larkin, Holt, McDonald, J Krakouer, Steele
Nil	Injuries	Nil
Nil	Reports	Nil
This marked Footscray's first VFL final win since 1961

==== Second semi-final (Essendon vs Hawthorn) ====
The second semi-final saw minor premiers Essendon host Hawthorn at VFL Park. The match was the fourth time the clubs had played in a final having contested the 1983 grand final as well as the second semi-final and grand final of 1984.

Scorecard

Second semi-final
Saturday, 14 September (7:25pm)	Essendon	def.	Hawthorn	VFL Park (crowd: 67,063)	Report
4.4 (28); 4.8 (32); 11.14 (80); 14.18 (102)	Q1; Q2; Q3; Final	3.2 (20); 6.2 (38); 6.3 (39); 9.8 (62)	Umpires: Cameron, Ryan; Television broadcast: Seven Network
Foulds 3 Merrett, Thompson 2 Baker 1	Goals	2 Brereton, Kennedy; 1 Buckenara
Watson	Best	Mew
Nil	Injuries	Nil
Nil	Reports	Nil

=== Week three (preliminary finals) ===
==== Preliminary final (Footscray vs Hawthorn) ====
The Preliminary final saw Footscray host Hawthorn at VFL Park on Saturday, 21 September. This marked the third final between the two sides and second in this series, having previously met in the Qualifying final two weeks earlier.

Scorecard

Preliminary final
Saturday, 21 September (2:30pm)	Footscray	def. by	Hawthorn	VFL Park (crowd: 55,246)	Report
4.4 (28); 6.6 (42); 10.7 (67); 15.9 (99)	Q1; Q2; Q3; Final	3.2 (20); 7.4 (46); 10.8 (68); 16.13 (109)	Umpires: James, Sawers; Television broadcast: Seven Network
Beasley 3 Edmond 2 Royal, Buhagiar 1	Goals	4 Judge, Dunstall; 2 Matthews; 1 Brereton
Hardie, Hawkins, Purser	Best	Loveridge, Judge, Ayres, Wallace
Nil	Injuries	Nil
Nil	Reports	Nil

=== Week four (Grand Final) ===
This was the third consecutive VFL Grand Final contested between Hawthorn and Essendon.

Grand final
28 September (2:30 pm)	Essendon	def.	Hawthorn	MCG (crowd: 100,042)	Report
6.4 (40); 11.9 (75); 15.11 (101); 26.14 (170)	Q1; Q2; Q3; Final	5.1 (31); 9.3 (57); 11.5 (71); 14.8 (92)	Umpires: Cameron, Robinson; Norm Smith Medal: Simon Madden; Television broadcast: Seven Network
Salmon 6 Merrett 5 Harvey 4 Watson 3 Baker, Ezard, Williams 2 Thompson, Duckworth 1	Goals	8 Brereton; 1 Matthews, McCarthy, Loveridge, Judge, Lester-Smith, DiPierdomenico
Madden, Merrett, Watson, Salmon, Baker, Thompson, Williams	Best	Brereton, Lester-Smith, Kennedy, Morris, O'Halloran
Nil	Injuries	Nil
Nil	Reports	Nil
Essendon won its 14th VFL premiership and achieved back-to-back VFL premierships for the fourth time.; The Bombers broke their Grand final record last quarter score from the previous season, kicking 11 goals 3 behinds.

== Bibliography ==
- Atkinson, Graeme; Atkinson, Brant (2009). The Complete Book of AFL Finals (4th ed.). Scoresby, Victoria: The Five Mile Press. ISBN 9781742112756.
