= 1986 Australian Football Championships =

Australian rules football series

Tournament information
- Sport: Australian football
- Location: Adelaide and Perth, Australia
- Dates: 13 May 1986–8 July 1986
- Format: Round Robin
- Teams: 3

Final champion
- Western Australia

The 1986 Australian Football Championships was an Australian rules football series between representative teams of the three major football states. Games involving Victoria were played under State of Origin rules, whilst the match between Western Australia and South Australia involved players based in their respective states at the time. The competition was won by Western Australia.

== Results ==
=== Game 1 ===
Home team	Home team score	Away team	Away team score	Ground	Crowd	Date	Time	Broadcast Network
South Australia	18.17 (125)	Victoria	17.13 (115)	Football Park	43,143	13 May 1986		

- E. J. Whitten Medal: Kevin Walsh (Victoria)
- Fos Williams Medal: Craig Bradley (South Australia)

=== Game 2 ===
Home team	Home team score	Away team	Away team score	Ground	Crowd	Date	Time	Broadcast Network
Western Australia	18.19 (127)	South Australia	12.16 (88)	Football Park		27 May 1986		

- Fos Williams Medal: Andrew Jarman (South Australia)

=== Game 3 ===
Home team	Home team score	Away team	Away team score	Ground	Crowd	Date	Time	Broadcast Network
Western Australia	21.11 (137)	Victoria	20.14 (134)	Subiaco Oval	39,863	8 July 1986		

- Simpson Medal: Brad Hardie (Western Australia)
- E. J. Whitten Medal: Dale Weightman (Victoria)
- Tassie Medal: Brad Hardie (Western Australia)

== Standings ==
1986 Australian Championship
Pos	Team	Pld	W	L	D	PF	PA	PP	Pts
1	Western Australia	2	2	0	0	264	222	118.9	4
2	South Australia	2	1	1	0	213	242	88.0	2
3	Victoria	2	0	2	0	249	262	95.0	0

== Squads ==
Western Australia

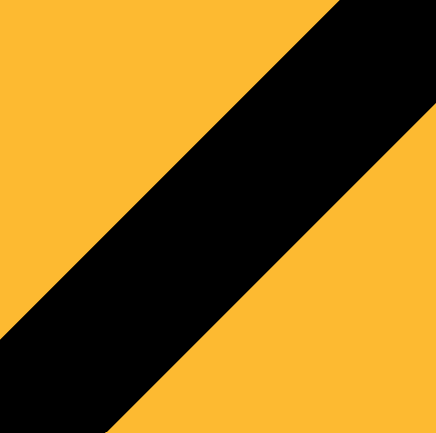

Coach: Ron Alexander
Both Games

- Mark Bairstow (South Fremantle)
- Shane Ellis (East Fremantle)
- Paul Harding (East Fremantle)
- Laurie Keene (Subiaco)
- Dean Laidley (West Perth)
- Dwayne Lamb (Subiaco)
- Andrew Macnish (Subiaco)
- Geoff Miles( Claremont)
- Michael Mitchell) (Claremont)
- Brian Peake (East Fremantle)
- Peter Sartori (Swan Districts)
- Colin Waterson (East Fremantle)
- Peter Wilson (East Fremantle)

vs South Australia

- Darren Bewick (West Perth)
- George Christie (Subiaco)
- Warren Dean (Subiaco)
- Steve Malaxos (Claremont)
- Darrell Panizza (Claremont)
- Brian Taylor (Subiaco)
- Robert Wiley (Perth)
- Greg Wilkinson (Subiaco)
- Murray Wrensted (East Fremantle)

vs Victoria

- Leon Baker (Essendon)
- Wayne Blackwell (Carlton)
- Gary Buckenara (Hawthorn)
- Peter Davidson (Claremont)
- Ross Glendinning (North Melbourne)
- Brad Hardie (Footscray)
- Rod Lester-Smith (Hawthorn)
- Phil Narkle (St Kilda)
- Maurice Rioli (Richmond)
South Australia

Coach: Graham Cornes

Both Games

- Michael Aish (captain) (Norwood)
- Matthew Campbell (North Adelaide)
- Grenville Dietrich (North Adelaide)
- Grantley Fielke (West Adelaide)
- Mark Naley (South Adelaide)
- John Paynter (Sturt)

vs Victoria

- Greg Anderson (Port Adelaide)
- David Bolton (Sydney)
- Craig Bradley (Carlton)
- Neil Craig (Sturt)
- Stephen Kernahan (Carlton)
- Bruce Lindsay (West Torrens)
- Chris McDermott (Glenelg)
- Tony McGuinness (Footscray)
- Max Parker (Woodville)
- Greg Phillips (Collingwood)
- John Platten (Hawthorn)
- Michael Redden (North Adelaide)
- Scott Salisbury (Glenelg)
- Keith Thomas (Norwood)
- Craig Williams (West Adelaide)
- Mark Williams (Port Adelaide)

vs Western Australia

- Richard Cousins (Central District)
- Tony Hall (Glenelg)
- Andrew Jarman (North Adelaide)
- David Robertson (North Adelaide)

Other Squad Members

- Danny Hughes (Melbourne)
Victoria

Coach: Kevin Sheedy
Both Games

- Tom Alvin (Carlton)
- Dermott Brereton (Hawthorn)
- Dennis Carroll (Sydney)
- Robert DiPierdomenico (Hawthorn)
- Garry Foulds (Essendon)
- Gerard Healy (Sydney)
- Gary Pert (Fitzroy)
- Trevor Poole (Richmond)
- Paul Salmon (Essendon)
- Dale Weightman (Richmond)
- Greg Williams (Sydney)

vs South Australia

- Roger Merrett (captain) (Essendon)
- Steven Clark (Essendon)
- Peter Dean (Carlton)
- Mark Harvey (Essendon)
- Glenn Hawker (Essendon)
- Shane Heard (Essendon)
- Richard Loveridge (Hawthorn)
- Paul Meldrum (Carlton)
- Geoff Raines (Collingwood)
- Kevin Walsh (Essendon)
- Mark Yeates (]Geelong)

vs Western Australia

- Terry Daniher (captain) (Essendon)
- Andrew Bews (]Geelong)
- Wayne Harmes (Carlton)
- Rick Kennedy (Footscray)
- Justin Madden (Carlton)
- Darren Millane (Collingwood)
- Tony Morwood (Sydney)
- Paul Roos (Fitzroy)
- Brian Royal (Footscray)
- Brian Taylor (Collingwood)
- Mark Thompson (Essendon)

Other Squad Members

- David Ackerly (North Melbourne)
- Graeme Atkins (North Melbourne)
- Denis Banks (Collingwood)
- Doug Barwick (Fitzroy)
- Mark Bos (Geelong)
- Billy Brownless (]Jerilderie)
- David Cloke (Collingwood)
- Peter Daicos (Collingwood)
- Anthony Daniher (Sydney)
- Bernie Evans (Carlton)
- Alan Ezard (Essendon)
- Robert Flower (Melbourne)
- Danny Frawley (St Kilda)
- Peter German (North Melbourne)
- Russell Greene (Hawthorn)
- Doug Hawkins (Footscray)
- Greg Healy (Melbourne)
- Wayne Johnston (Carlton)
- John Kennedy (Hawthorn)
- Chris Langford (Hawthorn)
- Matthew Larkin (North Melbourne)
- John Law (North Melbourne)
- Tony Lockett (St Kilda)
- Simon Madden (Essendon)
- Scott McIvor (Fitzroy)
- Shane Morwood (Collingwood)
- John Mossop (]Geelong)
- Merv Neagle (Sydney)
- Stephen Newport (Melbourne)
- Michael Pickering (Richmond)
- Michael Roach (Richmond)
- Terry Wallace (Hawthorn)
