= 1985 Brownlow Medal =

- Winner: Brad Hardie (Footscray); 22 votes

Television/radio coverage
- Network: Seven Network

The 1985 Brownlow Medal was the 58th year the award was presented to the player adjudged the fairest and best player during the Victorian Football League (VFL) home and away season. Brad Hardie of the Footscray Football Club won the medal by polling twenty-two votes during the 1985 VFL season.

== Leading votegetters ==
	Player	Votes
1st	Brad Hardie (Footscray)	22
2nd	Justin Madden (Carlton)	21
3rd	Paul Roos (Fitzroy)	16
=4th	Brian Royal (Footscray)	15
=4th	Matthew Larkin (North Melbourne)	15
=4th	Stephen Wallis (Footscray)	15
=4th	Greg Williams (Geelong)	15
=4th	Tim Watson (Essendon)	15
	Gary Ablett (Geelong)*	15
=9th	Maurice Rioli (Richmond)	14
=9th	Tom Alvin (Carlton)	14
	Jim Krakouer (North Melbourne)*	14

* The player was ineligible to win the medal due to suspension by the VFL Tribunal during the year.
