= 1980 WAFL season =

Australian rules football season

- Teams: 8
- Premiers: South Fremantle; 10th premiership
- Minor premiers: Swan Districts; 3rd minor premiership
- Sandover Medallist: Stephen Michael (South Fremantle)
- Bernie Naylor Medallist: Simon Beasley (Swan Districts)
- Matches played: 88

The 1980 WAFL season was the 96th season of the West Australian Football League in its various incarnations.

The season saw the league drop the word 'national' from its official name for the first time in fifty years, reverting to the title in use from 1908 to 1930. It also saw reigning premiers East Fremantle embark on the most rapid slide by any reigning premier since Subiaco went from first to last in 1916. Handicapped by the loss of Mario Turco to North Melbourne and Doug Green to retirement, along with injuries to Jim Sewell, Graham Carter, Swan Districts recruit Mark Olsen and Rod Lester-Smith and form lapses by Tony Buhagiar and Ian Thomson, the blue and whites also lost classy Essendon recruit Darren "Daisy" Williams who returned to Victoria for personal reasons after two matches. Old Easts were to win only five matches all season, and were in danger of their first wooden spoon for eighty-two years before a win in their penultimate game put them safely ahead of Subiaco, who had another disastrous season plagued by financial problems whereby calls to "Save Subi" were opposed by calls from opponents to "Flog Subi", leading to the worst record by any WA(N)FL club for twelve seasons.

In contrast, Swan Districts had the best start to a WAFL season for twenty-one years, winning their first thirteen matches and gaining a $2000 bonus from Marlboro for winning their first twelve – with a further $200 if they could achieve a perfect home-and-away season. Swans were overpowered at the "business end" by the Mal Brown-coached South Fremantle, who were unbeaten apart from a five-game slump between the fifth and ninth rounds. The Bulldogs' play late in the season is regarded as some of the finest ever seen in the WAFL, a claim substantiated by their thrashing top VFL club Carlton by 91 points in Escort Championships during March – easily the biggest win by a non-VFL club therein and in fact the biggest loss by a VFL club until the AFC Night Series was restricted thereto. The win over Carlton was impressive because Carlton fielded their Premiership team from 1979 and South Fremantle had many young reserve players in their team like Wayne Henwood, Daryl Stokes, John Townsend and others. Brad Hardie was only 16 years old.

== Home-and-away season ==
=== Round 1 (Easter weekend) ===
	Round 1
Saturday, 5 April	Subiaco 8.9 (57)	def. by	West Perth 17.16 (118)	Subiaco Oval (crowd: 9148)
Saturday, 5 April	South Fremantle 23.23 (161)	def.	Perth 16.21 (117)	Fremantle Oval (crowd: 11128)
Monday, 7 April	Claremont 11.17 (83)	def. by	East Perth 13.13 (91)	Claremont Oval (crowd: 15066)
Monday, 7 April	Swan Districts 24.17 (161)	def.	East Fremantle 6.14 (50)	Bassendean Oval (crowd: 14906)
Mal Brown's skill in moving rover Noel Carter to the centre and the inexperienced Ross Sweetman onto Bosustow ensures South Fremantle fight back after having had only three scoring shots to sixteen late in the opening quarter.; In their first game after the 1979 premiership, East Fremantle suffer the worst loss to that point in their history - an ominous sign for the season but a record comprehensively beaten the following year. Craig Holden holds 1979 leading goalkicker Kevin Taylor to 0.2 (2).

=== Round 2 ===
	Round 2
Saturday, 12 April	West Perth 15.11 (101)	def. by	South Fremantle 15.18 (108)	Leederville Oval (crowd: 11755)
Saturday, 12 April	East Perth 19.10 (124)	def. by	Swan Districts 21.20 (146)	Perth Oval (crowd: 17,490)
Saturday, 12 April	East Fremantle 15.21 (111)	def. by	Claremont 24.14 (158)	East Fremantle Oval (crowd: 9556)
Saturday, 12 April	Perth 27.20 (182)	def.	Subiaco 12.10 (82)	Lathlain Park (crowd: 5784)
Swan Districts show their maturity by warding off two major challenges from East Perth – who take the lead during their third quarter and get within eight points halfway through the last – owing to a superb roving division led by Neesham and Mike Richardson.; The playing of Peake at centre half-forward does not help East Fremantle as their star has only four possessions before being moved into the centre and Claremont build up a lead they easily maintain.

=== Round 3 ===
	Round 3
Saturday, 19 April	Swan Districts 22.23 (155)	def.	Perth 13.20 (98)	Bassendean Oval (crowd: 10190)
Saturday, 19 April	Subiaco 8.14 (62)	def. by	East Perth 23.17 (155)	Subiaco Oval (crowd: 5104)
Saturday, 19 April	West Perth 21.15 (141)	def.	Claremont 9.12 (66)	Leederville Oval (crowd: 8752)
Saturday, 19 April	East Fremantle 10.14 (74)	def. by	South Fremantle 28.13 (181)	East Fremantle Oval (crowd: 11212)
A brilliant display in windy and showery weather dominated by long handballing gives Old Easts a third successive thrashing and shows a below-strength Bulldogs as already better than 1979.; West Perth, led by Chris Stasinowsky and centre half-forward Ron Alderton, annihilate Claremont in wet conditions during the last quarter, kicking 12.2 (74) to 1.2 (8).

=== Round 4 ===
	Round 4
Saturday, 26 April	South Fremantle 25.17 (167)	def.	Subiaco 13.8 (86)	Fremantle Oval (crowd: 7284)
Saturday, 26 April	Claremont 20.18 (138)	def. by	Swan Districts 23.19 (157)	Claremont Oval (crowd: 14547)
Saturday, 26 April	East Perth 15.14 (104)	def. by	East Fremantle 20.22 (142)	Perth Oval (crowd: 10012)
Saturday, 26 April	Perth 15.17 (107)	def. by	West Perth 27.12 (174)	Lathlain Park (crowd: 10205)
A fine display by the returning Wayne Cormack and improved form by Ken Judge gives East Fremantle a first win and a short-lived hope of moving back to the top. Old Easts jumped the Royals with the first five goals and, despite further injuries that leave Rod Lester-Smith crippled, are never headed.

=== Round 5 ===
	Round 5
Saturday, 3 May	South Fremantle 22.11 (143)	def. by	Claremont 21.18 (144)	Fremantle Oval (crowd: 13028)
Saturday, 3 May	Subiaco 8.15 (63)	def. by	Swan Districts 27.32 (194)	Subiaco Oval (crowd: 6590)
Saturday, 3 May	Perth 18.22 (130)	def.	East Perth 16.10 (106)	Lathlain Park (crowd: 8672)
Saturday, 3 May	West Perth 26.24 (180)	def.	East Fremantle 11.9 (75)	Leederville Oval (crowd: 11217)
South Fremantle claim a behind was missed – which would have produced the league's first draw for six seasons – but the appeal was rejected when it was seen that Claremont's Kevin Worthington was given a free kick whilst a shot by South's Basil Campbell hit a goalpost.; The 32 behinds is the most Swan Districts have ever scored in a WAFL match, beating by five the previous record against East Perth from 1955.

=== Round 6 ===
	Round 6
Saturday, 10 May	Claremont 28.15 (183)	def.	Subiaco 14.11 (95)	Claremont Oval (crowd: 5613)
Saturday, 10 May	East Fremantle 16.16 (112)	def. by	Perth 22.11 (143)	East Fremantle Oval (crowd: 7420)
Saturday, 10 May	Swan Districts 27.20 (182)	def.	West Perth 8.8 (56)	Bassendean Oval (crowd: 22350)
Saturday, 10 May	East Perth 21.12 (138)	def.	South Fremantle 18.8 (116)	Perth Oval (crowd: 10857)
In front of the biggest-ever crowd at Bassendean and Swans' biggest home-and-away attendance at any venue, Swan Districts become the second team after West Perth in 1941 to win consecutive matches by over 100 points.; An all-in-brawl leads to four reports for Subiaco half-forward Frank Bucknall who gets six matches on one of the busiest nights for the WAFL Tribunal with seven players on report.

=== Round 7 ===
	Round 7
Saturday, 17 May	West Perth 13.21 (99)	def. by	East Perth 12.14 (86)	Leederville Oval (crowd: 14860)
Saturday, 17 May	Perth 20.12 (132)	def. by	Claremont 29.17 (191)	Lathlain Park (crowd: 9693)
Saturday, 17 May	South Fremantle 15.18 (108)	def. by	Swan Districts 22.15 (147)	Fremantle Oval (crowd: 19279)
Saturday, 17 May	Subiaco 20.25 (145)	def.	East Fremantle 9.13 (67)	Subiaco Oval (crowd: 4658)
In winning their first match, Subiaco record their biggest win against the reigning premier club until 1993, beating 76 points from 1968 (Note: The game when Austin Robertson kicked 15.11 (101).) They do this despite losing spearhead Peter Munro after kicking five in the first quarter and then Gary Buckenara.

=== Round 8 ===
	Round 8
Saturday, 24 May	East Perth 19.20 (134)	def.	Claremont 14.13 (97)	Perth Oval (crowd: 12596)
Saturday, 24 May	West Perth 22.18 (150)	def.	Subiaco 15.13 (103)	Leederville Oval (crowd: 8103)
Saturday, 24 May	Perth 19.17 (131)	def. by	South Fremantle 21.25 (151)	Lathlain Park (crowd: 8566)
Saturday, 24 May	East Fremantle 15.16 (106)	def. by	Swan Districts 29.17 (191)	East Fremantle Oval (crowd: 8348)
After being fifteen points behind at quarter-time, Swan Districts produce a devastating second half to stay unbeaten with a percentage of 179.41, as East Fremantle apply virtually no pressure.; The aggregate of 204 points in the second half – Swan Districts 22.8 (140) and East Fremantle 10.4 (64) – constitutes a record for any half of WA(N)FL football.

=== Round 9 (Foundation Day) ===
	Round 9
Saturday, 31 May	Perth 16.18 (114)	def. by	Swan Districts 19.17 (131)	Lathlain Park (crowd: 11316)
Saturday, 31 May	East Perth 28.11 (179)	def.	Subiaco 12.20 (92)	Perth Oval (crowd: 6680)
Monday, 2 June	Claremont 18.15 (123)	def.	West Perth 7.10 (52)	Claremont Oval (crowd: 13479)
Monday, 2 June	South Fremantle 14.21 (105)	def. by	East Fremantle 16.17 (113)	Fremantle Oval (crowd: 12487)
The presence of the injured Peake and a return to form by their small men gives East Fremantle a desire completely lacking in other games of 1980 and allows them to overpower their Fremantle rivals in a hard-running game – producing unfulfilled hopes of a revival.

=== Round 10 ===
	Round 10
Saturday, 7 June	South Fremantle 18.16 (124)	def.	West Perth 12.22 (94)	Fremantle Oval (crowd: 10976)
Saturday, 7 June	Swan Districts 16.21 (117)	def.	East Perth 12.12 (84)	Bassendean Oval (crowd: 19237)
Saturday, 7 June	Claremont 24.18 (162)	def.	East Fremantle 15.15 (105)	Claremont Oval (crowd: 9016)
Saturday, 7 June	Subiaco 13.17 (95)	def. by	Perth 16.17 (113)	Subiaco Oval (crowd: 4989)
11.6 (72) from Warren Ralph puts paid to hopes of a blue and white revival and reveals a new WAFL star, as the Tigers kick 12.4 (76) to 4.0 (24) after Old Easts drew to within five points early in the final quarter.

=== Round 11 ===
	Round 11
Saturday, 14 June	Subiaco 9.23 (77)	def. by	South Fremantle 16.19 (115)	Subiaco Oval (crowd: 4932)
Saturday, 14 June	Swan Districts 20.14 (134)	def.	Claremont 13.7 (85)	Bassendean Oval (crowd: 12870)
Saturday, 14 June	East Fremantle 16.14 (110)	def. by	East Perth 25.18 (168)	East Fremantle Oval (crowd: 6028)
Saturday, 14 June	West Perth 16.19 (115)	def.	Perth 10.17 (77)	Leederville Oval (crowd: 7352)
Swan Districts win their sixteenth match in succession as former Sandover winner and six-goal ruck-rover Graham Melrose shows leadership qualities for a team depleted by interstate calls.; Controversial West Perth ruckman Ben Jager proves he has improved beyond his formerly criticised disposal as he proves a worthy leader for a Cardinal team minus captain Fong and vice-captain Heal.

=== Round 12 ===
	Round 12
Saturday, 21 June	Claremont 3.4 (22)	def. by	South Fremantle 8.13 (61)	Claremont Oval (crowd: 6716)
Saturday, 21 June	East Perth 8.13 (61)	def. by	Perth 14.14 (98)	Perth Oval (crowd: 5048)
Saturday, 21 June	Swan Districts 7.12 (54)	def.	Subiaco 5.13 (43)	Bassendean Oval (crowd: 6105)
Saturday, 21 June	East Fremantle 7.8 (50)	def. by	West Perth 9.13 (67)	East Fremantle Oval (crowd: 3860)
On a day where 45.4 millimetres (1.79 in) of rain fell in Perth, Claremont's normally powerful attack kick the lowest WAFL score between 1969 and 1994, with Phil Krakouer kicking 3.2 of the 3.4 after Claremont, against all advice, kicked into a strong wind on winning the toss and conceded 4.3 (27) in sixteen minutes when the ground remained dry.; This also remains Claremont's lowest score ever against the Bulldogs.

=== Round 13 ===
	Round 13
Saturday, 28 June	Subiaco 12.16 (88)	def. by	Claremont 29.20 (194)	Subiaco Oval (crowd: 6640)
Saturday, 28 June	Perth 25.19 (169)	def.	East Fremantle 20.19 (139)	Lathlain Park (crowd: 5926)
Saturday, 28 June	West Perth 17.11 (113)	def. by	Swan Districts 16.19 (115)	Leederville Oval (crowd: 15847)
Saturday, 28 June	South Fremantle 24.18 (162)	def.	East Perth 10.14 (74)	Fremantle Oval (crowd: 11526)
Swan Districts win their eighteenth consecutive match dating back to late 1979, the best opening to a WAFL season since East Perth won the first seventeen in 1959; West Perth suffer the first of three heartbreaking losses for that cost them a finals berth, as Swans' superb fighting qualities see them win after being behind all afternoon.; Despite East Fremantle kicking 9.10 (64) in the final quarter, Perth's wingers Cam Shepherd and Alan Johnson had inflicted too much damage for the reigning premiers.

=== Round 14 ===
	Round 14
Saturday, 12 July	East Perth 11.19 (85)	def.	West Perth 9.11 (65)	Perth Oval (crowd: 6744)
Saturday, 12 July	Claremont 18.15 (123)	def.	Perth 10.18 (78)	Claremont Oval (crowd: 4945)
Saturday, 12 July	Swan Districts 10.8 (68)	def. by	South Fremantle 11.21 (87)	Bassendean Oval (crowd: 9791)
Saturday, 12 July	East Fremantle 17.22 (124)	def.	Subiaco 9.12 (66)	East Fremantle Oval (crowd: 2830)
South Fremantle's supremacy in the wet, with wingman Geoff O'Brien and Maurice Rioli superb, virtually seals the top two and ends Swans' hopes of an unbeaten season.

=== Round 15 ===
	Round 15
Saturday, 19 July	Claremont 19.14 (128)	def.	East Perth 12.6 (78)	Claremont Oval (crowd: 12580)
Saturday, 19 July	South Fremantle 20.20 (140)	def.	Perth 15.16 (106)	Fremantle Oval (crowd: 8258)
Saturday, 19 July	Subiaco 13.9 (87)	def.	West Perth 13.8 (86)	Subiaco Oval (crowd: 4795)
Saturday, 19 July	Swan Districts 19.18 (132)	def.	East Fremantle 17.11 (113)	Bassendean Oval (crowd: 9972)
Subiaco gain their second and last win in a game with no score for twenty minutes in the last quarter - remarkable in such a high-scoring era in fine, if windy, weather.

=== Round 16 ===
	Round 16
Saturday, 26 July	West Perth 13.14 (92)	def. by	South Fremantle 13.15 (93)	Leederville Oval (crowd: 7979)
Saturday, 26 July	East Perth 19.11 (125)	def.	Swan Districts 6.13 (49)	Perth Oval (crowd: 8182)
Saturday, 26 July	Perth 25.17 (167)	def.	Subiaco 9.8 (62)	Lathlain Park (crowd: 3061)
Saturday, 26 July	East Fremantle 10.9 (69)	def. by	Claremont 11.12 (78)	East Fremantle Oval (crowd: 4946)
Despite a stirring fightback after losing Adamson, Ellen and Logan before the game, West Perth lose by one point for the second successive match and East Perth move within a narrow percentage gap of claiming their place in the four.

=== Round 17 ===
	Round 17
Saturday, 2 August	Swan Districts 20.20 (140)	def.	Perth 12.14 (86)	Bassendean Oval (crowd: 9877)
Saturday, 2 August	Subiaco 13.10 (88)	def. by	East Perth 21.23 (149)	Subiaco Oval (crowd: 5138)
Saturday, 2 August	West Perth 16.15 (111)	def. by	Claremont 20.22 (142)	Leederville Oval (crowd: 12117)
Saturday, 2 August	East Fremantle 18.10 (118)	def. by	South Fremantle 21.22 (148)	East Fremantle Oval (crowd: 10880)
A return to form with 7.6 (48) by Warren Ralph – who had been hopeless in the wet – and the dominance of Moss and Hunter ensure Claremont of a win that puts West Perth out of the four for the first time during 1980.

=== Round 18 ===
	Round 18
Saturday, 9 August	South Fremantle 17.21 (123)	def.	Subiaco 7.14 (56)	Fremantle Oval (crowd: 6016)
Saturday, 9 August	Perth 13.19 (97)	def. by	West Perth 17.17 (119)	Lathlain Park (crowd: 5222)
Saturday, 9 August	Claremont 11.12 (78)	def. by	Swan Districts 14.19 (103)	Claremont Oval (crowd: 9961)
Saturday, 9 August	East Perth 27.10 (172)	def.	East Fremantle 13.16 (94)	Perth Oval (crowd: 5612)
Despite having Moss, Jim and Phil Krakouer and Ralph all well held, Claremont are only one point behind early in the last quarter before Swans show their ability under pressure and win well.

=== Round 19 ===
	Round 19
Saturday, 16 August	Subiaco 19.17 (131)	def. by	Swan Districts 26.14 (170)	Subiaco Oval (crowd: 5027)
Saturday, 16 August	Perth 10.9 (69)	def. by	East Perth 22.13 (145)	Lathlain Park (crowd: 6817)
Saturday, 16 August	South Fremantle 17.16 (118)	def.	Claremont 17.12 (114)	Fremantle Oval (crowd: 13138)
Saturday, 16 August	West Perth 21.25 (151)	def.	East Fremantle 11.13 (79)	Leederville Oval (crowd: 9034)
With Alan Watling kicking an equal career-best seven goals in this 250th match, West Perth run over hapless East Fremantle with 10.7 (67) to 2.3 (15) in the third quarter, but poor second and final quarters question their finals hopes in critics' eyes.; Subiaco, after being 86 points behind at half-time, kick 17.8 (110) to 10.3 (63) in the second half to reveal a question mark upon most of their football during 1980. Despite playing most of the second half at centre-half-forward with Stan Nowotny at full-forward, Simon Beasley kicks nine for Swans.

=== Round 20 ===
	Round 20
Saturday, 23 August	Swan Districts 21.16 (142)	def.	West Perth 14.15 (99)	Bassendean Oval (crowd: 12873)
Saturday, 23 August	East Perth 22.5 (137)	def. by	South Fremantle 21.15 (141)	Perth Oval (crowd: 14565)
Saturday, 23 August	Claremont 27.16 (178)	def.	Subiaco 13.13 (91)	Claremont Oval (crowd: 5462)
Saturday, 23 August	East Fremantle 25.13 (163)	def.	Perth 22.14 (146)	East Fremantle Oval (crowd: 4010)
Don Haddow, the last remaining player from South's 1970 premiership team, kick 7.4 (46) and leads well to fill the unfamiliar role of full-forward that had caused the Bulldogs trouble.; East Perth made a late charge from 41 points behind, led by Paul Arnold, that fails owing to weaknesses on the flanks and young ruckman Ironmonger's immobility around the ground.; With Ralph equaling his best performance of 11.6 (72) and Phil Krakouer unstoppable with his superb disposal, Claremont kick 18.9 (117) to 5.2 (32) after a promising first half by the Lions.

=== Round 21 ===
	Round 21
Saturday, 30 August	South Fremantle 18.14 (122)	def.	Swan Districts 10.16 (76)	Fremantle Oval (crowd: 15980)
Saturday, 30 August	West Perth 20.16 (136)	def.	East Perth 17.4 (106)	Leederville Oval (crowd: 14427)
Saturday, 30 August	Perth 15.12 (102)	def. by	Claremont 18.18 (126)	Lathlain Park (crowd: 5807)
Saturday, 30 August	Subiaco 18.13 (121)	def. by	East Fremantle 19.33 (147)	Subiaco Oval (crowd: 3412)
West Perth produce a superb team effort that sees them in the four early in the last quarter before several goals from Murray Couper reduce the margin and re-establish East Perth's place.; East Fremantle equal the second highest number of behinds in a senior WAFL match; Subiaco's colts kicked the embarrassing score of 1.16 (22), but scored 12.7 (79) against the same opponent the following weekend.

== Ladder ==
1980 ladder
Pos	Team	Pld	W	L	D	PF	PA	PP	Pts
1	Swan Districts	21	18	3	0	2764	2023	136.6	72
2	South Fremantle (P)	21	17	4	0	2674	2085	128.2	68
3	Claremont	21	13	8	0	2613	2194	119.1	52
4	East Perth	21	11	10	0	2501	2224	112.5	44
5	West Perth	21	11	10	0	2319	2104	110.2	44
6	Perth	21	7	14	0	2462	2691	91.5	28
7	East Fremantle	21	5	16	0	2161	2948	73.3	20
8	Subiaco	21	2	19	0	1790	3015	59.4	8

Rules for classification: 1) points; 2) percentage; 3) number of points for.
(P) Premiers

== Finals ==
=== First semi-final ===
	First semi-final
Saturday, 6 September	Claremont 15.10 (100)	def. by	East Perth 19.18 (132)	Subiaco Oval (crowd: 30,184)
Despite the loss of decorated centreman Phil Kelly, Steve Curtis' blanketing of Phil Krakouer after the first fifteen minutes and the dominance of key forward Paul Arnold and Grant Campbell gives East Perth a clear win.

=== Second semi-final ===
	Second semi-final
Saturday, 13 September	Swan Districts 11.12 (78)	def. by	South Fremantle 11.22 (88)	Subiaco Oval (crowd: 34,575)
In a fiery match, South Fremantle show they remained Western Australia's wet-weather specialists by keeping Swan Districts to 2.9 (21) after half-time as rain began and the pressure intensified.

=== Preliminary final ===
	Preliminary final
Saturday, 20 September	Swan Districts 28.13 (181)	def.	East Perth 15.15 (105)	Subiaco Oval (crowd: 34,193)
Record attendance for a WA(N)FL Preliminary Final; Swans beat Subiaco's 1959 record for the highest score in a WA(N)FL final by two points, showing the gap between the top two and the rest. East Perth cannot counter the centreline of Keith and Phil Narkle and Mike Smith, nor Graham Melrose and Beasley who finish with 16.1 between them.

== Grand final ==
1980 WAFL Grand Final
Saturday, 27 September	South Fremantle	def.	Swan Districts	Subiaco Oval (crowd: 46,208)
3.6 (24); 11.13 (79); 17.16 (118); 23.18 (156)	Q1; Q2; Q3; Final	2.2 (14); 3.7 (25); 8.7 (55); 15.8 (98)	Umpires: John Morris, Bob Phillips; Simpson Medal: Maurice Rioli (South Fremantle)
Carter 4, Hardie 3, Outhwaite 3, Vigona 3, Morley 2, Shaw 2, Michael 2, Rioli 2, O'Brien, Campbell Delmenico	Goals	Richardson 3, Neesham 2, Hoyer 2, Solin 2, Beasley 2, Holmes 2, Holden, Phil Narkle
Rioli, Carter, McKay, Michael, Vigona, Delmenico	Best	Neesham, Boucher, Skwirowski, Gillespie, Solin, Richardson
South Fremantle, on a winning streak dating back to Round 10, give what is often regarded as the finest display in any WAFL Grand Final to thrash Swan Districts, playing in their first Grand Final since 1965.
