= 1979 WANFL Grand Final =

The 1979 WANFL Grand Final was an Australian rules football game contested between the East Fremantle and South Fremantle Football Clubs, held at Subiaco Oval on 22 September 1979. It was the 49th annual Grand Final of the Western Australian National Football League, staged to determine the premiers for the 1979 WANFL season. The match, attended by 52,781 spectators, the record crowd for a football match at Subiaco, was won by East Fremantle by a margin of 33 points, marking that club's 25th premiership victory.

== Build up ==
Throughout the 1979 season, Claremont was the strongest side in the league, winning the minor premiership and defeating both Fremantle clubs during the home and away season. When finals came around though, both East Fremantle and South Fremantle hit form. Souths defeated the minor premiers in the second semi final to advance directly to the Grand Final, whilst East narrowly (2pts) overcame East Perth in the first semi final before comfortably (4 goals) beating Claremont in the Preliminary Final. It was East Fremantle's second Grand Final appearance in three years and the first of South's three successive Grand Final appearances.

== Match summary ==
The match is often cited as one of the greatest Grand Finals of all time (in any State League). It was typified by two players in particular, Kevin Taylor of East Fremantle (who kicked seven goals from a midfield position and claimed the Simpson Medal) and Maurice Rioli of South Fremantle. The game was a see sawing affair in which both teams both took and gave away potential match winning leads. In the end it was East Fremantle who had more poise and went on to win the match.

== Match ==
1979 WANFL Grand Final
Saturday, 22 September 1979 | South Fremantle | def. by | East Fremantle | Subiaco Oval (crowd: 52,781 (record))
4.5 (29); 8.10 (58); 14.14 (98); 16.16 (112) | Q1; Q2; Q3; Final | 3.5 (23); 10.13 (73); 13.16 (94); 21.19 (145) | Umpires: Ross Capes, John Morris; Simpson Medal: Kevin Taylor
Bauskis 5 Vigona, Morley 3 Mountain 2 Rioli, Carter, Haddow 1 | Goals | 7 Taylor; 4 Turco, Thomson; 3 Buhagiar; 1 Judge, Sims, Sewell
Mountain, Michael, Bauskis, Morley, Cavanagh, Rioli | Best | Buhagiar, Peake, Taylor, D Green, S Green, Carrott

== Attendance ==
The official game attendance of 52,781 was the record for the largest turn out to an Australian rules football game in Western Australia until 2018.

== Teams line-ups ==
=== East Fremantle ===
Backs: Andrew Purser, Roger Crouch, Mal Dobson

Half-backs: Merv Carrott, Doug Green, Peter LeCras

Centres: Rod Lester-Smith, Stephen Green, John Sims

Half-forwards: Mario Turco, Jim Sewell, Wayne Cormack

Forwards: Ken Judge, Ian Thomson, Kevin Taylor

Ruck: Graeme Carter, Brian Peake, Tony Buhagiar

Interchange: Robbie Johnson, Graham Kickett
