= Ian Williams (footballer, born 1957) =

Australian rules footballer

Personal information
- Born: 1 July 1957 (age 69)
- Original team: Swan Districts
- Height: 180 cm (5 ft 11 in)
- Weight: 80 kg (176 lb)

Playing career^{1}
| Years | Club | Games (Goals) |
| 1983–1985 | Footscray | 33 (45) |
- ^{1} Playing statistics correct to the end of 1985.

Ian Williams (born 1 July 1957) is a former Australian rules footballer who played for Footscray in the Victorian Football League (VFL).

Williams started his career in the West Australian Football League, with Swan Districts. He represented Western Australia in an interstate match against South Australia at Football Park in 1980.

Recruited by Footscray before the 1982 season, Williams did not come and entangled himself with WAFL authorities by intending to work in Port Hedland and play for Port Hedland Panthers in the De Grey league, which would have meant he faced a two-year ban had he actually played after injury.

Williams played his first VFL season in 1983 and was the Bulldogs’ third leading goal-kicker with 31 goals from 17 games, behind Simon Beasley and Jim Edmond. He had a memorable finish to the season, kicking five goals in a win over Fitzroy in round 20, then booting the winning goal against St Kilda the following round. His goal came in the dying minutes, when scores were level. He made a further 13 appearances in 1984 and three in 1985.
