= Ian Thomson (Australian rules footballer) =

Australian rules footballer (born 1949)

Personal information
- Full name: Ian Peter Thomson
- Born: 6 September 1949 (age 77)
- Height: 189 cm (6 ft 2 in)
- Weight: 88 kg (194 lb)

Playing career^{1}
Years	Club	Games (Goals)
1967–1978	East Perth	89 (75)
1973–1976	South Melbourne	74 (61)
1979–1982	East Fremantle	45 (127)

Representative team honours
Years	Team	Games (Goals)
1971	Western Australia	1 (2)
- ^{1} Playing statistics correct to the end of 1982.

Career highlights
- East Fremantle premiership 1979; East Fremantle leading goal-kicker 1981

Ian Peter Thomson (born 6 September 1949) is a former Australian rules footballer who played with South Melbourne in the Victorian Football League (VFL). He also played for East Perth and East Fremantle in the West Australian Football League (WAFL).

Thomson, a key position player, started his career at East Perth in 1967. He represented Western Australia in an interstate match against Victoria at Subiaco Oval on 17 July 1971.

Before the beginning of the 1973 VFL season, Thomson was in talks to join Fitzroy, but was signed by South Melbourne. He played 20 games in his first year, as a centre half-back. In 1974 he appeared in all 22 rounds and took a club high 120 marks. Used up forward for much of the year, Thomson also kicked 24 goals. He broke an ankle bone in a 1975 pre-season practice match, which kept him out of the side until round five, then towards the end of the season suffered a knee injury, which restricted him to 13 games that season. The next year he played 19 games and had a six-goal haul against St Kilda at Moorabbin Oval.

In 1977 and 1978, Thomson was back at East Perth. He was only playing suburban football early in the 1979 season when he got recruited by East Fremantle, where he was used as a forward. It was at full-forward that he kicked four goals for East Fremantle in their 1979 WANFL Grand Final win over South Fremantle. With prolific goal scoring teammate Kevin Taylor at South Melbourne, Thomson topped East Fremantle's goal-kicking in 1981.
