= Roy Ramsay =

Roy Ramsay may refer to:

- Roy Ramsay (footballer) (born 1956), Australian rules footballer
- Roy Ramsay (sailor) (1912–?), Bahamian Olympic sailor
