= Leo Dwyer =

Australian rules footballer

Personal information
- Full name: Leo Joseph Dwyer
- Born: 9 May 1907; Murchison, Victoria
- Died: 11 November 1995 (aged 88)
- Original team: Murchison
- Height: 172 cm (5 ft 8 in)
- Weight: 67 kg (148 lb)
- Position: Wingman

Playing career^{1}
Years	Club	Games (Goals)
1925–29, 1934–35	North Melbourne	71 (3)
- ^{1} Playing statistics correct to the end of 1935.

Leo Joseph Dwyer (9 May 1907 – 11 November 1995) was an Australian rules footballer who played with North Melbourne in the Victorian Football League (VFL).

Dwyer, a wingman, played eight games in North Melbourne's debut VFL season in 1925. Despite being in a struggling team, Dwyer polled well in the Brownlow Medal and had his best finish in 1928 when he was equal third.

When he went to Yarraville, without a clearance, he had to sit out of football for two years in order to get a permit to back come to North Melbourne. A four time Victorian representative, he resumed his VFL career in 1934 but would play only four more games with the club.

He then returned home to Murchison and led the local team to a Goulburn Valley Football League grand final in 1936, which they lost. He also won the 1936 GVFL's Morrison Medal that, which was awarded to the season's best and fairest player.

His son Laurie Dwyer as well as two grandsons, Anthony and David, all played for North Melbourne. He was also the uncle of West Australian Football League players Keith and Roy Harper, who both won Simpson Medals.

== See also ==
- 1927 Melbourne Carnival
