= David Dwyer =

Australian rules footballer

Personal information
- Full name: David Dwyer
- Born: 15 March 1964 (age 62)
- Original team: St Oliver's
- Height: 182 cm (6 ft 0 in)
- Weight: 80 kg (176 lb)
- Position: Winger

Playing career^{1}
| Years | Club | Games (Goals) |
| 1984–1991 | North Melbourne | 72 (37) |
- ^{1} Playing statistics correct to the end of 1991.

David Dwyer (born 15 March 1964) is a former Australian rules footballer who played with North Melbourne in the Victorian/Australian Football League (AFL).

== Early life and family ==
Dwyer attended St Joseph's College in North Melbourne and played football for St Oliver's.

He comes from a family with a strong connection to the North Melbourne Football Club. His father, Laurie Dwyer, is on the wing in North Melbourne's Team of the Century, and his grandfather, Leo Dwyer, played 71 games for North Melbourne. He also has a younger brother, Anthony Dwyer, who played for North Melbourne in the 1990s.

== Career ==
A wingman like his father, Dwyer came into the North Melbourne team in the 1984 VFL season and made 19 appearances.

Dwyer kicked the winning goal for North Melbourne in the club's round three win over Carlton at Princes Park in 1985. Carlton led by 16 points in time-on, but North Melbourne's Ross Glendinning managed two quick goals, which were followed by a 35th-minute goal to Dwyer, who had marked from a Tony Furey kick. The siren sounded as soon as the ball was bounced in the centre, which gave North Melbourne a 22.15 (147) to 22.13 (145) win. The season would end up being curtailed by injury; a stress fracture in his foot kept him out of the side for much of the year, but he played in both of North Melbourne's finals games.

In the 1986 season, Dwyer played 17 league games, a year when North Melbourne missed out on the finals only on percentage. Against Collingwood at Victoria Park in round 14, Dwyer broke his nose and suffered a concussion when he collided with umpire Ian Robinson.

He made 10 appearances in 1987, then didn't feature at all in the 1988 season, but did play in the reserves, which his father coached. This was followed by just one appearance in 1990 and three in 1991, his final season.
