= Chris Egan (footballer) =

Australian rules footballer, born 1986

Personal information
- Born: 26 October 1986 (age 40)
- Original team: Rumbalara Football Club/Murray U18
- Debut: Round 8, 15 May 2005, Collingwood vs. Richmond, at Melbourne Cricket Ground

Playing career^{1}
Years	Club	Games (Goals)
2005–2008	Collingwood	27 (22)
- ^{1} Playing statistics correct to the end of 2008.

Chris Egan (born 26 October 1986) is a former professional Australian rules footballer who played for the Collingwood Football Club in the Australian Football League (AFL).

== Career ==
Egan was picked up by Collingwood with their first round draft pick, tenth overall, in the 2004 AFL draft. He had represented Victoria Country in the 2004 AFL National Under 18 Championships.

Egan made his debut for Collingwood against Richmond in round 8 of the 2005 AFL season, and only missed two games for the remainder of the year.

He played a total of 24 games for 21 goals in 2005 and 2006, but only played three games in the following two seasons before being delisted in September 2008.

In early 2010, Egan signed with the Echuca Football Club which plays in the Goulburn Valley Football League.

== Personal life ==
Chris Egan is the nephew of Phil Egan, who played for Richmond and Melbourne, and also Les Bamblett who played for Footscray and Melbourne.
