= Westmeadows Football Club =

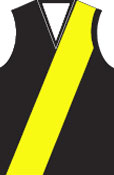
- The kit is black with a yellow sash
- Nickname: The Tigers
- Founded: 1970
- League: Essendon District Football League
- Home ground: Willowbrook Reserve, Westmeadows
- Website: westmeadowstigers.com

The Westmeadows Football Club is an Australian rules football club located 19 km north west of Melbourne in the suburb of Westmeadows and is affiliated with the Essendon District Football League.

After meetings with local community members the club was founded in 1970, as a junior club fielding Under 11's and currently fields six under-age teams.

The Senior club was established in 1977.

Westmeadows only Senior Grand Final success was in 1984 when the club defeated Ascot Vale by forty points at Windy Hill to win the B Grade premiership.

== Senior Premierships (2) ==
- 1984.
- 2026

=== VFL / AFL Players ===
- Kevin McGuire, Andrew Krakouer, Corey McKernan, Anthony Dwyer - North Melbourne;
- Anthony McGregor - Fitzroy;
- Scott Wynd and Craig Ellis - Footscray;
- Jordan Bannister and Andrew Welsh - Essendon;
- Dane Swan - Collingwood;
