= Rod MacPherson =

Australian rules footballer

Personal information
- Full name: Rod MacPherson
- Born: 21 September 1963 (age 63)
- Original team: Clarence
- Height: 177 cm (5 ft 10 in)
- Weight: 80 kg (176 lb)

Playing career^{1}
Years	Club	Games (Goals)
1982–1986	Footscray	43 (24)
1987	Brisbane Bears	7 (3)
Total		50 (27)
- ^{1} Playing statistics correct to the end of 1987.

Rod MacPherson (born 21 September 1963) is a former Australian rules footballer who played with Footscray and the Brisbane Bears in the Victorian Football League (VFL).

MacPherson started his career at Footscray in 1982, the same year that younger brother Stephen made his debut for the club. A utility, he kicked a goal in each of his first three league appearances and finished the year with seven games. The Tasmanian would never play more than 11 games in a single season at Footscray but played some good football in 1986 to average 19 disposals.

He badly injured his anterior cruciate ligament during a reserves final in 1986 and opted to have the ligament replaced with artificial fibre. When he returned to action in 1987 it was at a new club, Brisbane, with whom he would play seven games that year. It would be his last season in the VFL, as his leg became infected and he again needed surgery on his knee.

From 2000 to 2004, MacPherson was coach of the Bendigo Pioneers in the TAC Cup.
