= Rick Kennedy =

Personal information
- Full name: Richard Kennedy
- Born: 11 December 1960 (age 65)
- Original team: Traralgon (GLVFL)
- Height: 188 cm (6 ft 2 in)
- Weight: 83 kg (183 lb)
- Position: Fullback

Playing career^{1}
Years	Club	Games (Goals)
1981–1991	Footscray	158 (34)
- ^{1} Playing statistics correct to the end of 1991.

Career highlights
- Footscray captain: (1986–1988)

Rick Kennedy (born 11 December 1960) is a former Australian rules footballer who played for the Footscray Football Club in the Australian Football League (AFL).

Kennedy was appointed captain of Footscray in 1986 after former captain Jim Edmond departed for Sydney. Footscray team manager Stephen Nash commented that while losing Edmond's experience was difficult (he had played 150 games for Footscray), he was confident Kennedy would fill the role. Kennedy played most of his career as a fullback represented Victoria at a State of Origin game in 1986. A tough and physical player, he was regularly sent to the VFL Tribunal.

== Statistics ==
Legend
G	Goals	K	Kicks	D	Disposals	T	Tackles
B	Behinds	H	Handballs	M	Marks

Season	Team	No.	Games	Totals							Averages (per game)						
Season	Team	No.	Games	G	B	K	H	D	M	T	G	B	K	H	D	M	T
1981	Footscray	54	14	2	1	133	60	193	33	—N/a	0.1	0.1	9.5	4.3	13.8	2.4	—N/a
1982	Footscray	8	13	1	1	105	62	167	32	—N/a	0.1	0.1	8.1	4.8	12.8	2.5	—N/a
1983	Footscray	8	11	5	2	58	57	115	21	—N/a	0.5	0.2	5.3	5.2	10.5	1.9	—N/a
1984	Footscray	8	20	8	4	181	83	264	44	—N/a	0.4	0.2	9.1	4.2	13.2	2.2	—N/a
1985	Footscray	8	17	0	1	121	56	177	37	—N/a	0.0	0.1	7.1	3.3	10.4	2.2	—N/a
1986	Footscray	8	18	2	1	153	53	206	64	—N/a	0.1	0.1	8.5	2.9	11.4	3.6	—N/a
1987	Footscray	8	20	2	1	143	77	220	62	14	0.1	0.1	7.2	3.9	11.0	3.1	0.7
1988	Footscray	8	15	6	0	114	50	164	40	13	0.4	0.0	7.6	3.3	10.9	2.7	0.9
1989	Footscray	8	12	5	1	72	37	109	24	13	0.4	0.1	6.0	3.1	9.1	2.0	1.1
1990	Footscray	8	7	3	0	23	20	43	15	1	0.4	0.0	3.3	2.9	6.1	2.1	0.1
1991	Footscray	8	11	0	0	68	66	134	44	13	0.0	0.0	6.2	6.0	12.2	4.0	1.2
Career			158	34	12	1171	621	1792	416	54	0.2	0.1	7.4	3.9	11.3	2.6	0.8
