= Andrew Krakouer (footballer, born 1971) =

Personal information
- Born: 9 July 1971 (age 55)
- Original team: Westmeadows
- Debut: Round 17, 29 July 1989, North Melbourne vs. Hawthorn, at VFL Park
- Height: 178 cm (5 ft 10 in)
- Weight: 80 kg (176 lb)

Playing career^{1}
Years	Club	Games (Goals)
1989–1990	North Melbourne	8 (8)
- ^{1} Playing statistics correct to the end of 1990.

Andrew L. Krakouer (born 9 July 1971) is an Indigenous Australian former Australian rules footballer who played for North Melbourne in the Australian Football League.

He is the younger brother of Jim and Phil Krakouer and the uncle of Andrew J. Krakouer, who played for Richmond and Collingwood.

Andrew now runs a successful caretaking and gardening business called Menang Caretaking.
