= Anthony Dwyer =

Australian rules footballer

Personal information
- Full name: Anthony Dwyer
- Born: 1 January 1970 (age 56)
- Original team: Westmeadows (EDFL)
- Height: 185 cm (6 ft 1 in)
- Weight: 80 kg (176 lb)

Playing career^{1}
Years	Club	Games (Goals)
1990–1996	North Melbourne	30 (27)
- ^{1} Playing statistics correct to the end of 1996.

Anthony Dwyer (born 1 January 1970) is a former Australian rules footballer who played with North Melbourne in the Australian Football League (AFL) during the 1990s.

Recruited from Essendon District Football League (EDFL) club Westmeadows, Dwyer joined his brother David at North Melbourne in 1990 and played two games late in the season. He and his brother were the third generation of their family to play in the VFL/AFL, following their grandfather Leo and father Laurie.

After not playing a senior game in 1991, Dwyer made 16 appearances in 1992, kicking 21 goals. Dwyer struggled to break into North Melbourne's senior side over the next three seasons but in 1995 played in two AFL finals matches and participated in North Melbourne's reserves premiership.
