= Ian Fairley =

Australian rules footballer

Personal information
- Born: 18 September 1964 (age 62)
- Original team: Williamstown (VFA)
- Height: 189 cm (6 ft 2 in)
- Weight: 92 kg (203 lb)

Playing career^{1}
Years	Club	Games (Goals)
1983–1996	North Melbourne	217 (149)
- ^{1} Playing statistics correct to the end of 1996.

Career highlights
- North Melbourne Premiership player 1996

Ian Fairley (born 18 September 1964) is a former Australian rules footballer who played for North Melbourne during the 1980s and 1990s. A utility player, he was the club's leading goalkicker in 1989 and retired after winning the 1996 Grand Final with North Melbourne in which he kicked the final goal of the game. He is the father of Zachary Fairley

Before playing for North Melbourne, Fairley played for Williamstown in the Victorian Football Association. In 1980, he notably kicked eight goals against Box Hill in his senior VFA debut, at the age of only 15 years 9 months. Despite the performance, he was dropped from the senior team the following week, to ensure he remained eligible to play finals for the Thirds. Fairley played 38 senior games for the VFA Seagulls from his debut in 1980 until early in the 1983 season when he crossed to North, kicking 85 goals and played in Williamstown's Seconds premiership side in 1980 and was runner-up in the Thirds best and fairest award the same year. He was runner-up in the Seniors' best and fairest in 1981 as well as the leading goalkicker with a total of 39 and was also awarded a trophy for the most consistent player. Fairley was named in a forward pocket in the WFC 1980's Team of the Decade.

== Statistics ==
Legend
G	Goals	K	Kicks	D	Disposals	T	Tackles
B	Behinds	H	Handballs	M	Marks

Season	Team	No.	Games	Totals							Averages (per game)							Votes
Season	Team	No.	Games	G	B	K	H	D	M	T	G	B	K	H	D	M	T	Votes
1983	North Melbourne	37	6	15	5	27	9	36	10	—N/a	2.5	0.8	4.5	1.5	6.0	1.7	—N/a	0
1984	North Melbourne	6	9	27	16	79	13	92	48	—N/a	3.0	1.8	8.8	1.4	10.2	5.3	—N/a	0
1985	North Melbourne	6	5	4	2	34	10	44	13	—N/a	0.8	0.4	6.8	2.0	8.8	2.6	—N/a	0
1986	North Melbourne	6	17	18	9	165	54	219	68	—N/a	1.1	0.5	9.7	3.2	12.9	4.0	—N/a	0
1987	North Melbourne	6	21	26	13	184	60	244	95	14	1.2	0.6	8.8	2.9	11.6	4.5	0.7	3
1988	North Melbourne	6	14	12	14	137	38	175	64	10	0.9	1.0	9.8	2.7	12.5	4.6	0.7	1
1989	North Melbourne	6	18	28	11	150	62	212	67	14	1.6	0.6	8.3	3.4	11.8	3.7	0.8	2
1990	North Melbourne	6	14	7	0	123	41	164	38	14	0.5	0.0	8.8	2.9	11.7	2.7	1.0	1
1991	North Melbourne	6	21	1	1	178	62	240	72	15	0.0	0.0	8.5	3.0	11.4	3.4	0.7	0
1992	North Melbourne	6	16	5	5	132	33	165	36	7	0.3	0.3	8.3	2.1	10.3	2.3	0.4	0
1993	North Melbourne	6	14	3	0	101	33	134	22	13	0.2	0.0	7.2	2.4	9.6	1.6	0.9	0
1994	North Melbourne	6	19	2	0	185	51	236	59	11	0.1	0.0	9.7	2.7	12.4	3.1	0.6	0
1995	North Melbourne	6	19	0	0	152	56	208	38	11	0.0	0.0	8.0	2.9	10.9	2.0	0.6	0
1996†	North Melbourne	6	24	1	0	162	69	231	68	12	0.0	0.0	6.8	2.9	9.6	2.8	0.5	0
Career			217	149	76	1809	591	2400	698	121	0.7	0.4	8.3	2.7	11.1	3.2	0.7	7
