= Allen Daniels =

Australian rules footballer

Personal information
- Full name: Allen William Daniels
- Born: 21 April 1959 (age 67)
- Height: 177 cm (5 ft 10 in)
- Weight: 83 kg (183 lb)
- Position: Wingman

Playing career^{1}
Years	Club	Games (Goals)
1979–84, 1987	Claremont	105
1985–86	Footscray	32 (21)
1987–88	Perth	34
- ^{1} Playing statistics correct to the end of 1988.

Allen William "Shorty" Daniels (born 21 April 1959) is a former Australian rules footballer who played for Footscray in the Victorian Football League (VFL). He also played with Claremont and Perth in the West Australian Football League (WAFL).

Daniels, a five time Western Australian interstate representative, was a Claremont premiership player in 1981 when he came off the interchange bench in the Grand Final win over South Fremantle. He represented Australia in the 1984 International Rules series.

After transferring to Footscray, Daniels appeared in all but one of their 25 games in the 1985 VFL season, including three finals. He kicked two goals in the Semi Final victory over North Melbourne and also played in the Preliminary Final loss to Hawthorn.

A wingman, he struggled in 1986 with a groin injury and returned to Claremont the following year. He didn't see out the 1987 season at Claremont and instead crossed to Perth where he finished his career.
