= Les Bamblett =

Australian rules footballer

Personal information
- Full name: Les Bamblett
- Born: 5 August 1963 (age 63)
- Original team: Lemnos
- Height: 178 cm (5 ft 10 in)
- Weight: 85 kg (187 lb)
- Position: Forward

Playing career^{1}
Years	Club	Games (Goals)
1983	Melbourne	11 (12)
1984–1988	Footscray	37 (59)
Total		48 (71)
- ^{1} Playing statistics correct to the end of 1988.

Les Bamblett (born 5 August 1963) is a former Australian rules footballer who played with Melbourne and Footscray in the Victorian Football League (VFL).

An Indigenous Australian, Bamblett played as a forward and who won the 1982 Morrish Medal, as the best and fairest player in the VFL Under 19's competition. The following year he made his senior debut, against Collingwood in the opening round of the 1983 VFL season, kicking two goals. He made a further 10 appearances that year.

Bamblett trained at Richmond in the 1984 pre-season but they couldn't come to an agreement with Melbourne on a transfer fee. He instead joined West Australian Football League club Claremont for the 1984 season. Clearance issues meant he was unable to play a senior game and upon receiving an offer from Footscray, returned to Victoria during the season.

He kicked 51 goals for Footscray in 1985, to finished second in his club's goal-kicking behind Simon Beasley. His 24 games that season included three finals. Over the next three years he struggled with injuries and was only able to add a further six games to his tally.

Two of his nephews, Chris Egan and Andrew Lovett, both played in the Australian Football League.
