= Laurie Dwyer =

Australian rules footballer

Personal information
- Full name: Lawrence Joseph Dwyer
- Born: 6 November 1938
- Died: 17 October 2016 (aged 77)
- Original team: North Colts
- Height: 173 cm (5 ft 8 in)
- Weight: 65 kg (143 lb)

Playing career^{1}
| Years | Club | Games (Goals) |
| 1956–1970 | North Melbourne | 201 (34) |
- ^{1} Playing statistics correct to the end of 1970.

Lawrence Joseph Dwyer (6 November 1938 – 17 October 2016) was an Australian rules footballer who played for North Melbourne.

Dwyer came close to winning a Brownlow Medal on a few occasions, finishing second in 1961 and again in 1967 as well as placing third in 1960. He was a Syd Barker Medalist in 1961 and 1967, and was selected on the wing in North Melbourne's official 'Team of the Century'. Many supporters nicknamed Dwyer as "twinkletoes" because of his prowess as a ballroom dancer. Dwyer was part of the 1975 Premiership as a non-player, as he was North's runner in his distinctive fluro orange tracksuit top.

During the 1960s and 1970s Dwyer ran a sportgoods store in Pascoe Vale and entered into the hotel business in Brunswick in the 1980s. Two of his sons also played for North Melbourne, Anthony and David.

He won the Jack Titus Award in 1999. Dwyer died on 17 October 2016 at the age of 77.

== See also ==
- Australian football at the 1956 Summer Olympics
