= Peter Cameron (umpire) =

Australian rules football field umpire

Peter Peter Cameron (born 1951) is a former Australian rules football field umpire, who umpired 306 matches between 1977 and 1993 in the Australian Football League, including nineteen finals and three AFL Grand Final appearances. Since completing his umpiring career, he has continued to maintain a public presence through appearances in the E. J. Whitten Legends Game. He also worked at schools in Melbourne Victoria Australia including Wandin Yallock Primary School and Wallarano Primary School.

He retired from teaching in 2017.

== Umpiring career ==
Cameron began his umpiring career in 1977, the 279th field umpire to participate in VFL/AFL football. He quickly established a reputation as a fine umpire and practical joker, with one umpire remembering that he used to "cut the crotches out of our (underpants)." After just two years as an umpire, he received his first taste of the big time, being selected to officiate the night Grand Final between Collingwood and Hawthorn. It was another six years before he was appointed to his first day Grand Final, umpiring the Essendon-Hawthorn match of 1985. In all, Cameron officiated in three-day Grand Finals (1985, 1986 and 1988) and four-night Grand Finals (1979, 1981, 1985 and 1988), and at least one VFA Grand Final. Cameron finally retired in 1993, aged 42.

During his career, Cameron also won the Bishop Shield, an award given to the AFL Umpires' Association's most outstanding field umpire for the year. He received this award in 1985.

== Post umpiring ==
Cameron remained in the public eye due to his status as a long-serving umpire. He went on to work with a number of local football leagues in their umpiring departments, most notably and recently as Director of Umpires in the Yarra Valley Mountain District Football League. He has also appeared in several E.J. Whitten Legends Games, and has emerged as an outspoken critic of the bounce in football.
