= Kevin Taylor (Australian footballer) =

Australian rules footballer (born 1958)

Personal information
- Full name: Kevin James Taylor
- Born: 15 September 1958 (age 68)
- Original team: Carnamah
- Height: 180 cm (5 ft 11 in)
- Weight: 67 kg (10 st 8 lb)
- Positions: Rover, forward pocket

Playing career^{1}
Years	Club	Games (Goals)
1978–80, 1982–84	East Fremantle (WAFL)	97 (254) (Note: These tallies refer to premiership matches (home-and-away and finals matches) only.)
1981	South Melbourne (VFL)	14 (24)
1984	Fitzroy (VFL)	1 (1)
1985–86	Swan Districts (WAFL)	31 (72)
1987	West Torrens (SANFL)	33 (56)
Total		176 (407)

Representative team honours
Years	Team	Games (Goals)
1982-84	Western Australia	5 (7)
- ^{1} Playing statistics correct to the end of 1987.

Kevin James Taylor (born 15 September 1958) is a former Indigenous Australian rules footballer who played for South Melbourne and Fitzroy in the Victorian Football League (VFL), East Fremantle and Swan Districts in the West Australian Football League (WAFL), and West Torrens in the South Australian National Football League (SANFL).

A rover who could also play in the forward pocket, Taylor made his senior debut for East Fremantle in the WAFL in 1978 and won a Simpson Medal for his performance in the 1979 Grand Final, when he kicked seven goals, including his 100th for the season. Taylor’s goal kicking in the home-and-away season that year earned him the Bernie Naylor Medal and he finished the season with 102 goals.

In 1981 Taylor moved to Victoria to play for South Melbourne. He kicked 24 goals from his fourteen games, including a bag of five against North Melbourne at Arden Street Oval, before returning to East Fremantle. Fitzroy acquired his services in 1984 but Taylor played only one game for the VFL Lions before he returned to East Fremantle, kicking four goals in their Grand Final loss to Swan Districts. Taylor was then recruited by Swan Districts following the 1984 season and played at Bassendean Oval in both 1985 and 1986. He had a reasonable first season and a stunning opener with 25 kicks and five goals form the centre against East Perth in 1986, but by mid-season Taylor’s form declined so badly that he was first relegated to the reserves and then dropped entirely. At the end of 1986, a season that saw Swans fall from a mini-dynasty to last place, Taylor left and moved to struggling SANFL club West Torrens in 1987.

Taylor was a Western Australian interstate representative from 1982 to 1984, winning the Simpson Medal for best on ground against South Australia in 1982 and gaining All-Australian selection in 1983.
