= Brad Hardie =

Australian rules footballer

Personal information
- Full name: Bradley John Hardie
- Born: 10 October 1962 (age 64); East Fremantle, Western Australia
- Original team: Hilton Park Juniors
- Draft: No. 16, 1982 interstate draft
- Position: Utility

Playing career^{1}
Years	Club	Games (Goals)
1979–1984, 1993	South Fremantle (WAFL)	140 (308)
1985–1986	Footscray	47 (28)
1987–1991	Brisbane Bears	101 (192)
1992	Collingwood	2 (2)
Total		290 (530)

Representative team honours
Years	Team	Games (Goals)
1982–1988	Western Australia	9 (2)
1991	Queensland	1

International team honours
1984–1986	Australia	? (?)
- ^{1} Playing statistics correct to the end of 1992.

Career highlights
- Brownlow Medal: 1985; Charles Sutton Medal: 1986; 2× Brisbane Bears leading Goalkicker: 1989, 1990; WAFL Premiership player: 1980; Australian Football Hall of Fame inductee: 2019; All-Australian: 1986; 2× Tassie Medal: 1984, 1986; 2× Simpson Medal: 1984, 1986

Bradley John Hardie (born 10 October 1962) is a former Australian rules footballer who represented Footscray, Brisbane Bears, and Collingwood in the Australian Football League (AFL) as well as South Fremantle in the West Australian Football League (WAFL). Stocky built with bright red hair, Hardie was a versatile, attacking footballer who could play either as a forward or a defender; he won the game's highest individual honour, the Brownlow Medal, playing in the back pocket, but also led the goalkicking at Brisbane and South Fremantle.

== Early life ==
Hardie was born in East Fremantle, Western Australia. At the age of 15, he suffered burns to 45 percent of his body in a backyard accident. Throughout his playing career, Hardie wore long sleeves to hide the burn scars..

Hardie's brother Wayne played for East Fremantle.

== Playing career ==
=== South Fremantle ===
Hardie made his league debut for South Fremantle Football Club in the WAFL in 1979 as a 16-year-old. The following year he was a member of their premiership team. Starting the game on the interchange bench, he was a major contributor with three goals.

In 1982 Hardie was awarded the AW Walker Medal for the fairest and best player for South Fremantle. In 1984 Hardie was appointed captain of South Fremantle and also was the equal leading goalkicker. Representing Western Australia, he won both the Simpson Medal for the best player in the WA vs Victoria State of Origin game and the Tassie Medal for the best player in the State of Origin series and was named in the Australian side that toured Ireland. He would repeat each of these feats in 1986. He is the only player to be awarded two Tassie Medals.

=== Footscray ===
After 140 games for South Fremantle, he transferred to the Victorian Football League (VFL) to play for Footscray in 1985. He claimed the Brownlow Medal, only the second player since Haydn Bunton Sr. to win the award in his first VFL season, and the third West Australian after Graham Moss and Ross Glendinning.

Hardie's free-running style of play did not always sit well with Footscray coach Mick Malthouse, a disciplinarian who favoured teamwork over individual skill. There were signs of trouble between them during the Round 16 match against Richmond at the Western Oval when Hardie was ordered to the bench during the second quarter. Richmond had employed a blocking strategy to cut off his attacking play from defence, which saw the Tigers take a three-point lead into the half-time break. However, Hardie was returned to the field in the third quarter and ended up being among Footscray's best in a 27-point win. Things came to a head during Footscray's Round 21 match against Carlton at VFL Park. During the third quarter, Footscray coach Malthouse ordered Hardie off the field, reportedly frustrated with his lack of defensive accountability on his opponents. In response, Hardie took off his jumper and waved it defiantly at Malthouse. Footscray went on to lose the match by 79 points, which virtually ended their chances of participating in the finals series. Hardie left the ground straight after the game and was placed under a media ban by the club. He failed to attend a 10 a.m. training session the following day. That Monday, Hardie and Malthouse met for a two-hour discussion, after which Malthouse denied that there was a rift between him and Hardie.

Hardie was selected to play against Hawthorn in what would turn out to be his last game for Footscray. The Hawks, eventual premiers that season, won by 70 points, bringing to a sorry end a season that had begun with great promise. From an individual perspective, Hardie had an outstanding season, winning his second Tassie Medal, Footscray's best and fairest and earning an All-Australian selection. But by October, it was clear that Hardie had fallen out with Malthouse, and he publicly vowed not to play again for Footscray while Malthouse was coach.

At the same time, Footscray were preparing to press charges against the newly formed Brisbane Bears over allegations that they were planning to "poach" Hardie. At the club's AGM in December, star full-forward Simon Beasley urged club members who were angry about Hardie's intended departure to think through the issue before becoming too emotionally involved. Beasley, for his part, supported Malthouse and felt that Hardie's actions were detrimental to team harmony.

=== Brisbane Bears ===
Rejecting an offer to return home and join the newly formed West Coast Eagles, he was one of the few big name signings for the Brisbane Bears in their inaugural season in 1987 and stayed with the club until 1991. He was leading goalkicker for the Bears in 1989 and 1990 and set a record of 9 goals in a game against Carlton in 1989. He was the first player to play 100 games for Brisbane.

=== Collingwood ===
With dramatic off-field problems at Brisbane, involving company collapses, rescues and restructures and on-field failure with consecutive wooden spoons, Hardie was traded to Collingwood at the end of 1991, but only managed to play 2 matches in 1992.

After returning to Perth in 1993 he rejoined South Fremantle and again topped the goalkicking list. He would retire having played 297 senior games, 150 in the VFL/AFL, 139 for South Fremantle in the WAFL and 8 state games. He was drafted by the Sydney Swans in the mid-year draft of 1993, but did not play a game for the club.

== Media career ==
Hardie retired in 1994 and joined the media as a sports talkback radio host and commentator with Perth radio station 6PR. In addition to his radio commitments, Hardie also writes a weekly feature article for the Sunday Times and an AFL blog called "Harden Up" for the Sydney Morning Herald.

Hardie has spoken at corporate and sporting events as a motivational speaker and hosted government, corporate and sporting events across Australia as a master of ceremonies.

== Personal life ==
In November 2007, it was reported that Hardie's Brownlow medal had been seized and offered for sale by a government agency as payment for one of his debts. However, Hardie denied that he was in financial trouble or that it had any relation to gambling debts. After a magistrate had approved the sale in June 2008, it was reported that businessman Brian Cleary, to whom Hardie had sold his Brownlow medal in 1996 under a loan agreement, tried to stop the sale of the medal, despite the court order ruling that Cleary would receive any money made at the auction surplus to the value of Hardie's debts.

In November 2010, Hardie was convicted of four taxation offenses: two charges of misusing an ABN and two of tax fraud. He admitted he collected more than $26,000 in GST but did not forward it to the Australian Taxation Office. Deputy Chief Magistrate Dan Muling fined Hardie $1200 and placed him on a 12-month good-behaviour bond.
