= John Holt (Australian footballer) =

Australian footballer

Personal information
- Full name: John Holt
- Born: 29 September 1962 (age 64)
- Original team: The Basin
- Height: 183 cm (6 ft 0 in)
- Weight: 79 kg (174 lb)
- Position: Half-forward

Playing career^{1}
Years	Club	Games (Goals)
1981–88	North Melbourne	71 (78)
- ^{1} Playing statistics correct to the end of 1988.

John Holt (born 29 September 1962) is a former Australian rules footballer who played with North Melbourne in the Victorian Football League (VFL).
