= Graeme Atkins =

Australian rules footballer

Personal information
- Full name: Graeme Atkins
- Born: 30 October 1963 (age 63)
- Original team: South Melbourne Districts
- Height: 179 cm (5 ft 10 in)
- Weight: 73 kg (161 lb)
- Position: Rover

Playing career^{1}
Years	Club	Games (Goals)
1982–1986	North Melbourne	61 (39)
1987–1989	Collingwood	21 (14)
Total		82 (53)
- ^{1} Playing statistics correct to the end of 1989.

Graeme Atkins (born 30 October 1963) is a former Australian rules footballer who played for North Melbourne and Collingwood in the Victorian Football League (VFL). Originally recruited from South Melbourne Districts, Atkins played as a rover. He made his debut in round 3, 1982 against Fitzroy at the Junction Oval and he had 11 disposals for the match. In total, Atkins played 61 games and kicked 39 goals for North Melbourne between 1982 and 1986 before standing down early in 1987 to achieve a clearance to Collingwood. After moving to Collingwood, Atkins played 21 games and kicked 14 goals between 1987 and 1989. He played 18 games in his first season at Collingwood but a knee injury restricted him to just three games in his final two seasons. Atkins polled two Brownlow Medal votes in his final season for North Melbourne in 1986 when he also played an equal high 19 games for the season. His final VFL match was in round 16, 1989 against Hawthorn at Princes Park.
