= Peter Davidson (footballer) =

Australian rules footballer (1960–2024)

Personal information
- Full name: Peter Alan Davidson
- Born: 29 August 1963
- Died: 16 April 2024 (aged 60); Collie, Western Australia, Australia
- Original team: Claremont
- Height: 183 cm (6 ft 0 in)
- Weight: 80 kg (176 lb)

Playing career^{1}
Years	Club	Games (Goals)
1983-1986	Claremont	66 (22)
1987	West Coast Eagles	2 (0)
1990	Brisbane Bears	7 (3)
1992	East Perth	7 (1)
Total		81 (27)
- ^{1} Playing statistics correct to the end of 1990.

Peter Alan Davidson (29 August 1963 – 16 April 2024) was an Australian rules footballer who played with the West Coast Eagles and Brisbane Bears in the Victorian/Australian Football League (VFL/AFL).

Davidson was signed up by West Coast for their inaugural season in 1987 after strong performances in the West Australian Football League (WAFL) for Claremont, with whom he won a 'Fairest and Best' award in 1985. He had also represented Western Australia in a state match against Victoria at Subiaco in 1986. At West Coast, Davidson suffered from soft tissue injuries and managed just two appearances, prompting him to retire from the Victorian Football League (VFL) at the end of the season.

However Davidson returned in 1990 with Brisbane and in his first game kicked two goals against Geelong. A wingman, Davidson did not play again until late in the season but put together five successive games to finish the year and performed well against Sydney with 28 disposals and five tackles.

Davidson left Brisbane after just one season but continued playing football in the WAFL with East Fremantle and was a member of their 1992 premiership team.

Davidson died from cancer on 16 April 2024, at the age of 60.
