= Mark Kellett =

Australian rules footballer

Personal information
- Full name: Mark Kellett
- Born: 29 July 1960 (age 66)
- Original team: Melbourne Fourths
- Height: 188 cm (6 ft 2 in)
- Weight: 91 kg (201 lb)
- Position: Defender

Playing career^{1}
Years	Club	Games (Goals)
1979–1982	St Kilda	55 (7)
1983–1986	Footscray	63 (3)
1988–1990	Sydney	37 (1)
Total		155 (11)
- ^{1} Playing statistics correct to the end of 1990.

Mark Kellett (born 29 July 1960) is a former Australian rules footballer who played with St Kilda, Footscray and Sydney in the Victorian/Australia Football League (VFL/AFL).

Kellett was 18 when he made his debut for St Kilda, midway through the 1979 VFL season. A tall defender, he didn't experience a win until his 14th game and became an important player for the Saints down back. He played the first 17 games of the 1980 season and missed just two matches in 1981. He would later serve on St Kilda's board.

In 1983 he crossed to Footscray and made 20 appearances in his first season. He played in both of Footscray's finals in 1985.

After leaving Footscray, Kellett moved to Sydney for work purposes but in 1988 was convinced by the Swans to resume his career. He spent three seasons with Sydney before retiring for good.
