= Stephen McCann =

Australian rules footballer

Personal information
- Born: 31 May 1958 (age 68)
- Original team: Geraldton
- Height: 192 cm (6 ft 4 in)
- Weight: 96 kg (212 lb)

Playing career^{1}
Years	Club	Games (Goals)
1977–1988	North Melbourne	226 (201)
- ^{1} Playing statistics correct to the end of 1988.

Career highlights
- VFL Premiership player: (1977); 1983 All-Australian (State carnival); Four-time Victorian representative

Stephen McCann (born 31 May 1958) is a former Australian rules footballer who played for North Melbourne in the Victorian Football League (VFL) during the 1980s. He was a key position player and ruckman for the Kangaroos and a premiership player in 1977.
