= Neil Peart (footballer) =

Australian rules footballer (born 1958)

Personal information
- Full name: Neil Peart
- Born: 5 October 1958 (age 68)
- Original team: Northcote (VFA)
- Height: 188 cm (6 ft 2 in)
- Weight: 95 kg (209 lb)
- Position: Defender

Playing career^{1}
Years	Club	Games (Goals)
1982	Collingwood	13 (0)
1983–1984	Richmond	31 (2)
1985	Footscray	9 (5)
1986–1987	Richmond	9 (7)
Total		62 (14)
- ^{1} Playing statistics correct to the end of 1987.

Neil Peart (born 5 October 1958) is a former Australian rules footballer who played with Collingwood, Richmond and Footscray in the Victorian Football League (VFL) during the 1980s.

Initially a VFA player at Northcote, Peart was a key defender; while at Northcote, Peart finished second for the Field Medal (best and fairest in VFA Division 2) in 1981. He spent the 1982 VFL season playing for Collingwood before being traded to Richmond the following season. In 1984 he was twice voted best on ground at the Brownlow Medal count, for his efforts against North Melbourne and Hawthorn.

In 1985 he was at Footscray, where he would play nine VFL games, including a qualifying final and preliminary final.

When Peart returned to Richmond in 1986, this meant he had switched clubs four times in five seasons. He could only add another nine games to his career tally in his second stint at Richmond.
