= Michael Passmore =

Australian rules footballer (born 1964)

Personal information
- Full name: Michael Passmore
- Born: 20 December 1964 (age 61)
- Original team: Boronia
- Height: 187 cm (6 ft 2 in)
- Weight: 80 kg (176 lb)

Playing career^{1}
Years	Club	Games (Goals)
1984–88	North Melbourne	42 (1)
- ^{1} Playing statistics correct to the end of 1988.

Michael Passmore (born 20 December 1964) is a former Australian rules footballer who played with North Melbourne in the Victorian Football League (VFL).
