= Mario Turco =

Australian rules footballer

Personal information
- Full name: Mario Turco
- Born: 21 March 1956 (age 70)
- Original teams: East Fremantle, (WAFL)

Playing career^{1}
Years	Club	Games (Goals)
1974–79, 1983–85	East Fremantle	121 (131)
1980–82	North Melbourne	9 (9)
- ^{1} Playing statistics correct to the end of 1985.

Mario Turco (born 21 March 1956) is a former Australian rules footballer who played for the East Fremantle Football Club in the West Australian Football League and for the North Melbourne Football Club in the Victorian Football League (VFL).

== Career ==
Turco played for the WA Schoolboys that won the national championships in 1971 and made his debut for East Fremantle in 1974 and was a member of their 1979 and 1985 WAFL Premiership winning teams. He was recruited by North Melbourne in 1980, but only played nine games for them over three seasons.
