= Jim Sewell =

Australian rules footballer and manager

Personal information
- Full name: James Vernon Sewell
- Born: 3 February 1955 (age 71); Geraldton, Western Australia
- Original team: Geraldton
- Height: 188 cm (6 ft 2 in)
- Weight: 80 kg (176 lb)
- Position: Key positions

Playing career^{1}
Years	Club	Games (Goals)
1976–82	East Fremantle	141 (373)
1983–86	Footscray	76 (62)
- ^{1} Playing statistics correct to the end of 1986.

James Vernon Sewell (born 3 February 1955) is a former Australian rules footballer who played for Footscray in the Victorian Football League (VFL) during the 1980s.

Born in Geraldton, Sewell commenced his senior football career with West Australian Football League (WAFL) club East Fremantle and was centre half forward in their 1979 premiership team with a reputation for high flying marks. When he crossed to Footscray in 1983 he was used initially as a full-back but the following season Sewell played up forward, kicking 28 goals. He was a losing Preliminary Finalist in 1985, kicking two goals in the loss to Hawthorn.

A regular Western Australian representative, Sewell played in the original 1977 State of Origin game and the 1979 Perth State of Origin Carnival.

Following his retirement from football, Sewell served as the Football Manager of the Brisbane Bears.
