= Stephen Wallis =

Australian rules footballer

Personal information
- Full name: Stephen Wallis
- Born: 27 October 1964 (age 62); Leongatha, Victoria
- Original team: Leongatha (GFL)
- Height: 183 cm (6 ft 0 in)
- Weight: 80 kg (176 lb)

Playing career^{1}
Years	Club	Games (Goals)
1983–1996	Footscray	261 (57)

Representative team honours
Years	Team	Games (Goals)
1985, 1991	Victoria	3 (0)
- ^{1} Playing statistics correct to the end of 1996.

Career highlights
- Footscray captain: 1989

Stephen "Wally" Wallis (born 27 October 1964) is a former Australian rules footballer who represented the Footscray Football Club in the Victorian Football League (VFL). He currently holds the club record for most consecutive games from debut.

Originally from Leongatha, Victoria, Wallis arrived at the Footscray in 1982 and suffered an injury in a reserves game which kept him out for the rest of the season. He made his senior VFL debut in 1983 and became a solid defender and occasional midfielder. During this time he completed his schooling at Trinity Grammar, commuting to Kew from Maidstone.

In 1989, Wallis was appointed captain of the Bulldogs, and became a representative of Victoria in State of Origin. Midway through 1991 he suffered a broken wrist, forcing him to miss the rest of the season, but returned in 1992 to help the Bulldogs to the finals. However, injury struck again early in the following year when he badly injured his knee.

In 1996, he announced his retirement and played his last game in a three-point loss to Essendon (which is documented in the film Year of the Dogs).

His son Mitch Wallis was drafted in the 2010 national draft under the father–son rule.

== Statistics ==
Season	Team	No.	Games	Totals							Averages (per game)						
Season	Team	No.	Games	G	B	K	H	D	M	T	G	B	K	H	D	M	T
1983	Footscray	24	22	7	13	287	226	513	102	—N/a	0.3	0.6	13.0	10.3	23.3	4.6	—N/a
1984	Footscray	24	22	7	12	292	160	452	76	—N/a	0.3	0.5	13.3	7.3	20.5	3.5	—N/a
1985	Footscray	24	25	6	10	464	158	622	178	—N/a	0.2	0.4	18.6	6.3	24.9	7.1	—N/a
1986	Footscray	24	22	6	6	325	142	467	112	—N/a	0.3	0.3	14.8	6.5	21.2	5.1	—N/a
1987	Footscray	24	22	3	6	329	145	474	68	46	0.1	0.3	15.0	6.6	21.5	3.1	2.1
1988	Footscray	24	13	7	1	156	121	277	36	19	0.5	0.1	12.0	9.3	21.3	2.8	1.5
1989	Footscray	24	22	3	1	247	181	428	80	33	0.1	0.0	11.2	8.2	19.5	3.6	1.5
1990	Footscray	24	19	1	1	216	186	402	73	24	0.1	0.1	11.4	9.8	21.2	3.8	1.3
1991	Footscray	24	10	0	1	106	90	196	40	19	0.0	0.1	10.6	9.0	19.6	4.0	1.9
1992	Footscray	24	24	12	1	343	185	528	112	43	0.5	0.0	14.3	7.7	22.0	4.7	1.8
1993	Footscray	24	4	0	0	50	30	80	22	7	0.0	0.0	12.5	7.5	20.0	5.5	1.8
1994	Footscray	24	23	3	1	245	125	370	83	34	0.1	0.0	10.7	5.4	16.1	3.6	1.5
1995	Footscray	24	12	2	0	115	60	175	43	18	0.2	0.0	9.6	5.0	14.6	3.6	1.5
1996	Footscray	24	21	0	1	224	117	341	76	22	0.0	0.0	10.7	5.6	16.2	3.6	1.0
Career			261	57	54	3399	1926	5325	1101	265	0.2	0.2	13.0	7.4	20.4	4.2	1.6
