= Simon Beasley =

Australian rules footballer, born 1956

Personal information
- Full name: Simon Francis Beasley
- Born: 26 July 1956 (age 70)
- Original team: University (WAAFL)
- Debut: Round 1, 1982, Footscray vs. Essendon, at Windy Hill
- Height: 195 cm (6 ft 5 in)
- Weight: 102 kg (225 lb)

Playing career^{1}
Years	Club	Games (Goals)
1978–1981	Swan Districts	80 (292)
1982–1989	Footscray	154 (575)
Total		234 (867)

Representative team honours
Years	Team	Games (Goals)
1981–1985	Western Australia	4 (9)
- ^{1} Playing statistics correct to the end of 1989.

Career highlights
- Coleman Medal: (1985); Bernie Naylor Medal: (1980 - tied); 2× Swan Districts leading goalkicker 1980, 1981; 7× Footscray leading goalkicker: (1982, 1983, 1984, 1985, 1986, 1987, 1988); Footscray Team of the Century; Simpson Medal: (1981); West Australian Football Hall of Fame, inducted 2007

Simon Francis Beasley (born 26 July 1956) is a former Australian rules footballer who played for the Swan Districts Football Club in the West Australian Football League (WAFL) and for the Footscray Football Club in the Victorian Football League (VFL).

A pale and slightly-built full forward, Beasley is the Western Bulldogs' leading career goalkicker and also holds the record for kicking the most goals in the VFL between 1980 and 1989. He is also one of two footballers (the other being George Moloney) to have kicked 100 or more goals in a season in both the WAFL and VFL/AFL competitions.

Beasley worked as a stockbroker for various firms during and after his playing days. In 2002, he became a licensed bookmaker and started his own company, which ceased after he was banned in 2009 for improper conduct. Beasley returned to bookmaking in 2018 as director of the company BEAZABET.

== Early career ==
Beasley grew up in Western Australia and attended Guildford Grammar School. He then studied at the University of Western Australia, from where he graduated with a Bachelor of Commerce. During his university days, Beasley played football for the University Club in the then Western Australian Amateur Football League before joining Swan Districts in 1978. He soon established himself as a full forward of note, tying for the 1980 Bernie Naylor Medal with Warren Ralph, eventually finishing the season with 97 goals.

1981 was a special season individually for Beasley, kicking over 100 goals for the first time and finishing the season with 119 goals, second behind Ralph. He also won the Simpson Medal for his six-goal performance in the State of Origin clash against Victoria. During this period, a number of fellow West Australian footballers were moving across the Nullarbor to try their luck in the VFL, and it seemed certain Beasley would do the same.

== Playing career at Footscray ==
Beasley moved to Melbourne at the end of 1981 and found work with as a stockbroker with Randall & Co, and signed with Footscray in the VFL. He made his senior debut in the opening round of the 1982 VFL season against Essendon at Windy Hill. Beasley had a forgettable day, barely touching the ball and getting hit in the face by Essendon enforcer Ron Andrews. The Bulldogs lost by 109 points, and would eventually end up taking out the wooden spoon. However, Beasley did not take long to establish himself as a prominent full-forward, kicking 12 goals against Geelong in Round 16 and ending his debut season with a very respectable 82 goals in an under-performing side, finishing second only behind North Melbourne’s leading goal kicker Malcolm Blight.

From there, Footscray gradually began to rebuild, first by luring Carlton administrator Shane O'Sullivan as general manager in October 1982 and then in 1983 fielding up to 15 new players, including fellow Western Australian Andrew Purser and future club stalwarts Stephen Wallis, Brian Royal and Peter Foster. The Bulldogs' performances improved dramatically; although they still suffered the odd thrashing (with 100+ point losses to Essendon and North Melbourne) they were sitting in fifth at the end of Round 12, and after falling to ninth by Round 20, finished the season strongly to end in seventh place on the ladder with ten wins. From an individual perspective, Beasley was unable to match his previous season's goal tally, finishing with 69 majors from 20 games, but was nonetheless consistent, with his best effort being a seven-goal haul against Fitzroy in Round 9 at VFL Park, and three games where he kicked six goals.

The unexpected resignation of popular former player and coach Ian Hampshire in January 1984 (presumably over a pay dispute as the club's financial woes were well-known at the time) heralded the arrival of recently retired Richmond defender Mick Malthouse, who would begin a coaching career that would eventually span over three decades. The Bulldogs again finished seventh on the ladder in 1984, this time with 11 wins. Beasley began the season in spectacular fashion, with hauls of 11 against Richmond in Round 1, eight against Geelong in Round 2, and five against North Melbourne in Round 3. But almost just as quickly his form fell away, being held goalless against Hawthorn and Fitzroy.

In 1985, the Bulldogs rose up the ladder, finishing in second place at the end of the home-and-away season before losing to Hawthorn in the Preliminary Final. Beasley played a key role, taking out the Coleman Medal with 93 goals during the home-and-away season, his personal best. He reached the century mark with a seven-goal performance in the First Semi-Final against North Melbourne and ended the season with 105 goals, becoming only the second Bulldog after Kelvin Templeton to kick 100 goals in a season.

The following year his career was affected by a dispute with former club Swan Districts, who demanded $50,000 from the Bulldogs to keep Beasley in Victoria as the WAFL Swans believed his lease had expired – though nothing was actually given.

In 1988, Beasley kicked 82 goals to overtake Templeton as the Bulldogs’ most prolific goal scorer. However, after a major back injury in the pre-season Beasley played in the reserves for the first three rounds of 1989. He did return in the fourth round and kicked six goals the following week against Melbourne, but the following four rounds saw only six further goals and his knee and back injuries forced Beasley into retirement in June.

Beasley remains the highest goal kicker in the Bulldogs’ history and also kicked the most goals during the 1980s in the VFL.

== Life after football ==
In 1997, Beasley was appointed as one of the founding directors for the Trevor Barker Foundation, which in partnership with Challenge provides a holiday facility in Torquay for children going through cancer and their families. He stepped aside in 2010.

In July 1999, Beasley was dismissed from his position of associate director at Credit Suisse First Boston for apparent breaches of compliance related to having business interests outside work. Beasley, who had worked for CSFB since 1993, said he would contest the charges.

In 2006 Beasley was appointed to host the Western Region Football League's show on Channel 31, renamed The Simon Beasley Show.

Beasley obtained his bookmaker license in 2002 and set up his own betting company. In 2009, he was charged with breaching a number of betting regulations between April 2006 and October 2008. Specifically, he had taken 1,598 bets totalling $3.8 million in turnover without lodging them with racing authorities. Beasley pleaded guilty, was fined AUD$50,000 and suspended for four years before making a return to bookmaking in 2018.

== Playing statistics ==
Legend
G	Goals	K	Kicks	D	Disposals	T	Tackles
B	Behinds	H	Handballs	M	Marks

Led the league for the season only
Led the league after finals only
Led the league after season and finals

Season	Team	No.	Games	Totals							Averages (per game)						
Season	Team	No.	Games	G	B	K	H	D	M	T	G	B	K	H	D	M	T
1982	Footscray	18	21	82	67	181	48	229	120	—N/a	3.9	3.2	8.6	2.3	10.9	5.7	—N/a
1983	Footscray	18	20	69	37	136	34	170	92	—N/a	3.5	1.9	6.8	1.7	8.5	4.6	—N/a
1984	Footscray	18	18	61	37	128	16	144	99	—N/a	3.4	2.1	7.1	0.9	8.0	5.5	—N/a
1985	Footscray	18	25	105	41	172	23	195	127	—N/a	4.2	1.6	6.9	0.9	7.8	5.1	—N/a
1986	Footscray	18	22	88	48	156	23	179	111	—N/a	4.0	2.2	7.1	1.0	8.1	5.0	—N/a
1987	Footscray	18	21	73	47	146	32	178	124	3	3.5	2.2	7.0	1.5	8.5	5.9	0.1
1988	Footscray	18	21	82	29	142	15	157	107	3	3.9	1.4	6.8	0.7	7.5	5.1	0.1
1989	Footscray	18	6	15	15	39	8	47	33	2	2.5	2.5	6.5	1.3	7.8	5.5	0.3
Career			154	575	321	1100	199	1299	813	8	3.7	2.1	7.1	1.3	8.4	5.3	0.2
