= Stephen MacPherson =

Australian rules footballer and coach

Stephen Macpherson

Personal information
- Born: 2 December 1964 (age 61)
- Original team: Clarence (TANFL)
- Height: 178 cm (5 ft 10 in)
- Weight: 87 kg (192 lb)

Playing career^{1}
Years	Club	Games (Goals)
1982–1995	Footscray	188 (152)
- ^{1} Playing statistics correct to the end of 1995.

Career highlights
- 2× AFL Reserves Premiership player: (1988, 1994); Tasmanian Football Hall of Fame, inducted 2005

Stephen Macpherson (born 2 December 1964) is a former Australian rules footballer who played for the Footscray Football Club in the Australian Football League (AFL).

He became coach of the Greenvale Football Club, affiliated with the Essendon District Football League in 2004, steering them to multiple finals appearance over his six years at the club. Greenvale won the grand final in 2007, and played off in but lost the last three grand final matches in 2008, 2009 and 2010. At the end of the 2010 season he was the longest-serving coach of any side in the EDFL.

At the senior football presentation night of Greenvale Football Club on 9 October 2010, Macpherson declared that he was officially stepping down as senior coach of the club. He had previously advised in 2009 that he would be leaving the club altogether at the end of the 2010 season, regardless of the outcome. At this point in time he has been succeeded by ex-North Melbourne Kangaroos player Anthony Rock who will undertake coaching the club in season 2011.

Macpherson's son Darcy was drafted with the 21st pick in the 2016 rookie draft. Western Bulldogs chose not to take him under the father–son rule. He made his debut for the Gold Coast Suns in Round 7, 2016.

When the Tasmanian Football Hall of Fame was established in 2005, Macpherson was one of the inaugural inductees.

His nephew Isaac Gold is following in his footsteps, winning the 2023 Premiership for the Mosman Park Football Club Colts.
