= Jim Edmond =

Australian rules footballer (born 1958)

Personal information
- Full name: Jim Edmond
- Born: 3 September 1958 (age 68); Glasgow, Scotland
- Original team: Bairnsdale
- Height: 183 cm (6 ft 0 in)
- Weight: 89 kg (196 lb)
- Position: Forward

Playing career^{1}
Years	Club	Games (Goals)
1977–85	Footscray	154 (226)
1986	Sydney	17 (19)
1987–88	Brisbane Bears	17 (42)
Total		188 (287)
- ^{1} Playing statistics correct to the end of 1988.

Jim Edmond (born 3 September 1958 in Glasgow, Scotland) is a former Australian rules footballer.

Originally from Bairnsdale Football Club, Edmond made his senior debut for Footscray Football Club in the Victorian Football League (VFL) in 1977. Winning the club goalkicking award in 1981 with 25 goals, Edmond was Footscray captain from 1983 to 1985. After playing in three finals matches for Footscray in 1985, Edmond left the club over a contractual dispute.

Edmond transferred to the Sydney Swans for the 1986 VFL season, before moving to Brisbane Bears for their inaugural season in 1987. Edmond spent two seasons at Brisbane, playing 17 games before his retirement at the end of the 1988 VFL season.

His elder brother Bob also played in the VFL and was a dual Commonwealth Games silver medalist in weightlifting.

== Statistics ==
Legend
G	Goals	K	Kicks	D	Disposals	T	Tackles
B	Behinds	H	Handballs	M	Marks

Season	Team	No.	Games	Totals							Averages (per game)						
Season	Team	No.	Games	G	B	K	H	D	M	T	G	B	K	H	D	M	T
1977	Footscray	20	16	14	17	166	47	213	62	—N/a	0.9	1.1	10.4	2.9	13.3	3.9	—N/a
1978	Footscray	20	9	4	4	94	22	116	32	—N/a	0.4	0.5	10.4	2.4	12.9	3.6	—N/a
1979	Footscray	20	10	8	13	104	26	130	30	—N/a	0.8	1.3	10.4	2.6	13.0	3.0	—N/a
1980	Footscray	20	20	24	27	236	83	319	98	—N/a	1.2	1.4	11.8	4.2	16.0	4.9	—N/a
1981	Footscray	20	19	25	21	186	82	268	99	—N/a	1.3	1.1	9.8	4.3	14.1	5.2	—N/a
1982	Footscray	20	21	46	23	264	66	330	108	—N/a	2.2	1.1	12.6	3.1	15.7	5.1	—N/a
1983	Footscray	20	18	41	29	193	84	277	86	—N/a	2.3	1.6	10.7	4.7	15.4	4.8	—N/a
1984	Footscray	20	19	26	30	232	66	298	98	—N/a	1.4	1.6	12.2	3.5	15.7	5.2	—N/a
1985	Footscray	20	22	38	25	277	68	345	122	—N/a	1.7	1.1	12.6	3.1	15.7	5.5	—N/a
1986	Sydney	8	17	19	26	132	52	184	70	—N/a	1.1	1.5	7.8	3.1	10.8	4.1	—N/a
1987	Brisbane Bears	20	12	34	20	97	27	124	53	11	2.8	1.7	8.1	2.3	10.3	4.4	0.9
1988	Brisbane Bears	20	5	8	11	37	23	60	25	4	1.6	2.2	7.4	4.6	12.0	5.0	0.8
Career			188	287	246	2018	646	2664	883	15	1.5	1.3	10.7	3.4	14.2	4.7	0.9
