= John Law (Australian footballer) =

Personal information
- Born: 8 January 1959 (age 67)
- Original team: Strathbogie
- Height: 185 cm (6 ft 1 in)
- Weight: 91 kg (201 lb)

Playing career^{1}
Years	Club	Games (Goals)
1978–1989	North Melbourne	219 (9)
- ^{1} Playing statistics correct to the end of 1989.

John Law (born 8 January 1959) is a former Australian rules footballer who represented North Melbourne in the Victorian Football League (VFL).

Known for his uncompromising and direct style of play, Law spent most of his career on the half back flank and captained North Melbourne in both 1988 and 1989. He was also a sports teacher during his playing days and would later become Head of Junior School at Presbyterian Ladies' College, Melbourne.
