= Roy Ramsay (footballer) =

Australian rules footballer

Personal information
- Full name: Roy Ramsay
- Born: 3 January 1956 (age 70)
- Original team: Broadmeadows
- Height: 180 cm (5 ft 11 in)
- Weight: 82 kg (181 lb)

Playing career^{1}
Years	Club	Games (Goals)
1976–1981	North Melbourne	53 (0)
1982	Essendon	3 (0)
1983–1986	North Melbourne	70 (11)
Total		126 (11)
- ^{1} Playing statistics correct to the end of 1986.

Roy Ramsay (born 3 January 1956) is a former Australian rules footballer who played with North Melbourne and Essendon in the Victorian Football League (VFL).

Ramsay, one of 10 children, attended Broadmeadows Technical College and played for Broadmeadows Football Club prior to his recruitment by North Melbourne. Playing as a back pocket specialist, Ramsay's first stint at North Melbourne was from 1976 to 1981, during which time he never managed to play more than nine games in a season. He did play in four finals, including North Melbourne's 1979 preliminary final loss to Collingwood, but didn't feature in any of their three grand final appearances.

In 1982, Ramsay played for Essendon, but was restricted mainly to the reserves, where he won a best and fairest award.

Ramsay returned to North Melbourne in 1983 and became a regular fixture in the team, playing 23 games that year, 21 in 1984 and 19 in 1985. He played seven games in the 1986 VFL season, then didn't make any appearances the following year, troubled by a shoulder injury. In 1988 he left the club for Victorian Football Association club Port Melbourne.

Ramsay is a cousin of Bill Swan, a former VFA footballer who is the father of Brownlow Medalist Dane Swan.
