= Rod Lester-Smith =

Australian rules footballer and coach

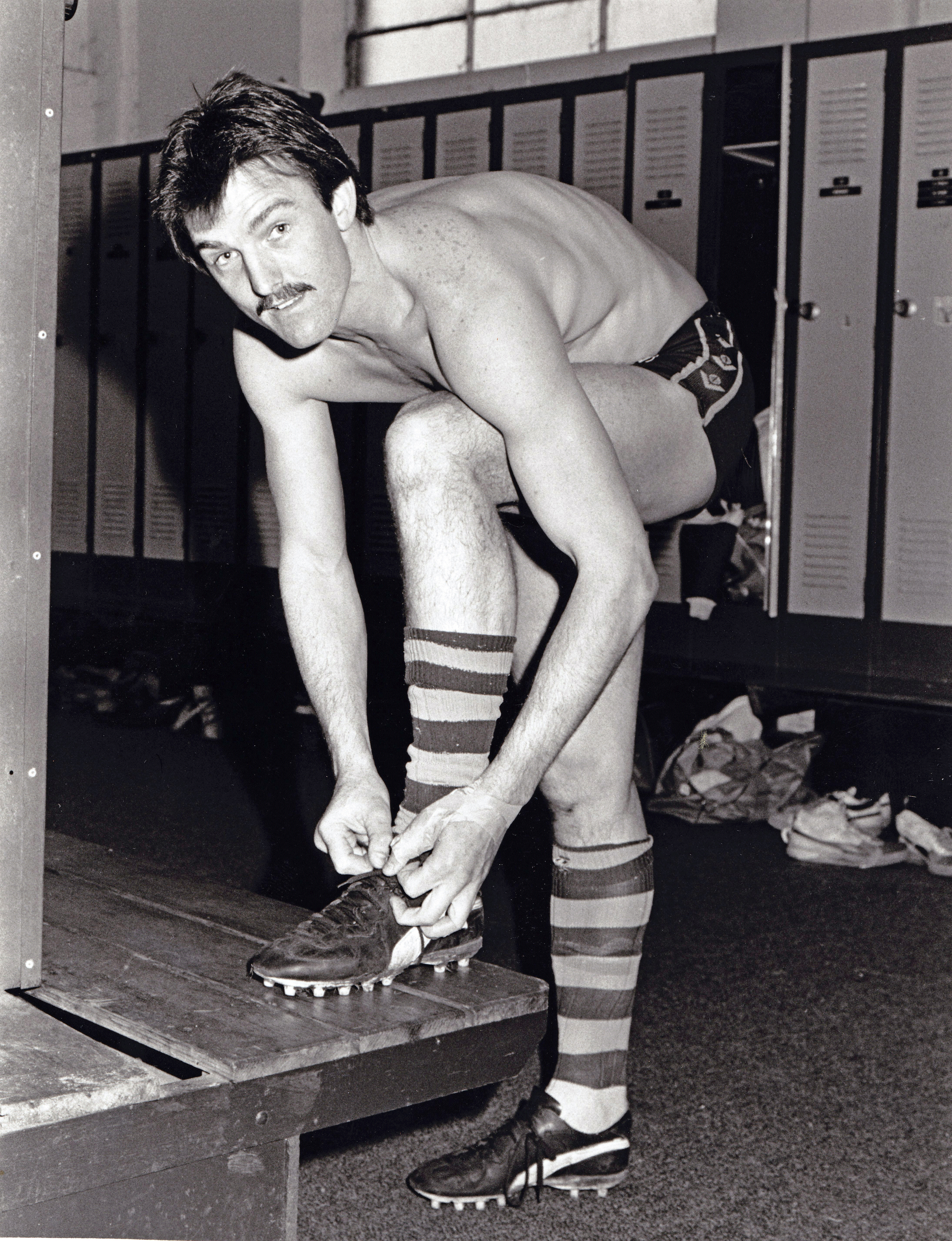

Personal information
- Nickname: Snuffy
- Born: 18 July 1959 (age 67)
- Draft: No. 10, 1982 interstate draft
- Height: 188 cm (6 ft 2 in)
- Weight: 89 kg (196 lb)
- Position: Defender

Playing career^{1}
Years	Club	Games (Goals)
1978–83, 1993	East Fremantle	97 (81)
1984–87	Hawthorn	70 (23)
1988–91	Brisbane Bears	39 (15)
Total		206 (119)

Representative team honours
Years	Team	Games (Goals)
1981–87	Western Australia	4
1991	Queensland	1
- ^{1} Playing statistics correct to the end of 1993.

Career highlights
- WAFL premiership 1979; All-Australian 1985; AFL reserves premiership (captain) 1991

Rod Lester-Smith (born 18 July 1959) is a former Australian Rules Footballer who played with East Fremantle in the West Australian Football League, as well as Hawthorn and the Brisbane Bears in the VFL/AFL. He was also a member of the 1985 All-Australian team.

Tall, pacy and strong overhead, Lester-Smith endured more than his fair share of injury woes during six seasons at East Fremantle. He managed 89 games in his first stint with the Sharks, played mostly on the wing. He was also a member of the famous 1979 WAFL premiership team.

Drafted to Hawthorn in 1982, Lester-Smith spent most of his time at half back and was unlucky not to play in a winning grand final team during Hawthorn's dominance in the 1980s. Lester-Smith played in grand final losses in 1984 and 1985; when Hawthorn won the flag in 1986, he was a last minute omission from the grand final team.

A Western Australian and Queensland interstate representative, Lester-Smith was selected as an All-Australian representative in 1985 under coach Kevin Sheedy. In the same year, he was Hawthorn's top vote getter at the Brownlow Medal count. In 1988, Lester-Smith crossed to the Brisbane Bears where he celebrated his 100th VFL/AFL game with a 66 point win over Geelong at Carrara. Having missed out on finals for the league in 1991 and in his final game for the club, Lester-Smith answered an SOS from former Hawthorn teammate, then reserves coach Rodney Eade. He captained the Bears to a historic reserves premiership claiming the first AFL premiership flag to travel outside of Victoria.

Upon returning home, Lester-Smith finished his playing career with one season back at East Fremantle. He then made the quick transition to football manager where he had immediate success with the Sharks winning premierships in 1992 and 1994 under close friend and former teammate Ken Judge.

Lester-Smith was later recruited as a development coach, assistant coach and football manager at the West Coast Eagles from 1995 to 2001 under Mick Malthouse, followed by Ken Judge.

After several years out of the game, he returned to East Fremantle where he coached the club for part of the 2003 and 2004 season.
