= Tony Buhagiar =

Australian rules footballer (born 1955)

Personal information
- Full name: Anthony Francis Buhagiar
- Born: 3 October 1955 (age 71); Western Australia
- Height: 166 cm (5 ft 5 in)
- Weight: 74 kg (163 lb)
- Position: Rover

Playing career^{1}
Years	Club	Games (Goals)
1973–1980, 1986	East Fremantle	138 (274)
1981–1984	Essendon	83 (135)
1985	Footscray	25 (36)
Total		246 (445)
- ^{1} Playing statistics correct to the end of 1986.

Anthony Francis "Tony" Buhagiar (born 3 October 1955) is a retired Australian rules footballer who played in the Victorian Football League (VFL).

A pint-sized rover, he made his senior debut for West Australian National Football League club East Fremantle in the early 1970s as a free-spirited 16-year-old. By 1979 he had become a premiership player, represented Western Australia at state of origin and gained All-Australian selection.

In 1981 he crossed the Nullarbor Plain and joined Victorian Football League club Essendon. One of only three players to debut for the Bombers that year he had an immediate impact on his new team kicking 42 goals to be their leading goalkicker, winning their best first-year player award, coming third in The Age's player of the year award, and eighth in the Brownlow Medal. He was also a member of Essendon's night premiership, a mid-week knockout competition played on a Tuesday night during the season.

As his career with Essendon progressed, the awards continued to flow including being the team's leading vote getter in the 1982 Brownlow Medal, most determined player in 1983 and state selection again in 1984. Although small in stature (166 cm and 74 kg), the courageous rover/goalsneak became a crowd favourite and was affectionately known as "The Budgie".

In his four years with Essendon, Buhagiar played in seven finals games and was among the team's best players in five of them, proving his reliability in big games. He was a part of Essendon's ill-fated 1983 grand final team, which suffered the biggest loss in grand final history until that time.

Essendon were to avenge their defeat in the following year's grand final, but it was to be without the "Budgie", who, after an injury interrupted season, was named only as an emergency.

Disappointed at having missed the Premiership, Buhagiar decided to return home to East Fremantle, but was talked into resurrecting his VFL career with Footscray. He played the 1985 season with the Bulldogs, which include three more finals, and finished the season with a handy 36 goals. He returned to East Fremantle in 1986.

Buhagiar was a board member of the Fremantle Football Club from 2000 until 2009.
