= Ken Judge =

Australian rules footballer, born 1958

Personal information
- Born: 15 January 1958
- Died: 15 January 2016 (aged 58); Perth, Western Australia
- Original team: East Fremantle (WAFL)
- Draft: No. 7, 1981 interstate draft
- Debut: Round 1, 1983, Hawthorn vs. Fitzroy, at Junction Oval

Playing career^{1}
Years	Club	Games (Goals)
1975–1982, 1987	East Fremantle (WAFL)	120 (263) (Note: These tallies refer to premiership matches (home-and-away and finals matches) only.)
1983–1986	Hawthorn	72 (158)
1987–1988	Brisbane Bears	17 (18)
Total		201 (439)

Coaching career
Years	Club	Games (W–L–D)
1991–1994	East Fremantle (WAFL)	91 (51–40–0)
1996–1999	Hawthorn	89 (37–50–2)
2000–2001	West Coast	44 (12–31–1)
- ^{1} Playing statistics correct to the end of 1988.

Career highlights
- WAFL premiership player: 1979; VFL premiership player: 1983; Hawthorn best first year player 1983; WAFL premiership coach: 1992, 1994

Ken Judge (15 January 1958 – 15 January 2016) was an Australian rules footballer and coach.

== Playing career ==
=== East Fremantle Football Club ===
Judge played 120 games for East Fremantle in the Western Australian Football League and was an important member of Old Easts' team in the 1979 grand final win over archrival South Fremantle, one of the most famous grand finals in Western Australian footy folklore.

=== Hawthorn Football Club ===
Recruited by Hawthorn, Judge played 72 games from 1983 until 1986, and made an immediate impact playing in a premiership in his first season and winning the Hawks' Best First Year Player award. Judge also played in the Grand Finals of 1984 and 1985 but struggled for selection in 1986.

=== Brisbane Bears ===
He moved to the Brisbane Bears, where he played another 17 games without making much impact in 1987 and 1988.

== Coaching career ==
=== East Fremantle ===
Judge retired from playing at the end of 1988 and returned to Western Australia to take up various coaching roles. As a coach, he enjoyed premiership success with his former club, East Fremantle, in 1992 and 1994.

=== Carlton assistant coach (1995) ===
In 1995, Judge was appointed as an assistant coach at Carlton, Carlton had the most successful premiership season to that time. On the strength of a recommendation from Carlton Football Club senior coach David Parkin, who was also a former Hawthorn captain and premiership coach.

=== Hawthorn senior coach (1996-1999) ===
Judge was appointed senior coach of Hawthorn from 1996 until 1999, finishing 8th and therefore reaching the finals in his first year. However, in the following years Hawthorn struggled and finished 15th in the 1997 season and 13th in the 1998 season before just missing out of the finals in 1999, finishing 9th. Judge then resigned as Hawthorn senior coach, with a year to run on his contract. Judge was then replaced by Peter Schwab as Hawthorn Football Club senior coach.

=== West Coast (2000-2001) ===
Judge then returned to Western Australia as senior coach of the West Coast Eagles, after Mick Malthouse stepped down as West Coast Eagles senior coach at the end of the 1999 season. Judge coached West Coast Eagles for the 2000 and 2001 AFL seasons. He was unsuccessful during his time there, where West Coast Eagles under Judge finished 13th in the 2000 season and 14th in the 2001 season before he was sacked at the end of the 2001 season and replaced by John Worsfold as West Coast Eagles senior coach.

== Radio career ==
Following the end of his coaching career, Judge worked for the Australian Broadcasting Corporation (ABC) as a sports commentator for ABC Radio Grandstand. In 2009, he apologised for an on-air gaffe when he referred to fellow commentator Jon Dorotich as "bigger than Hitler's last gas bill".

== Death ==
Judge died on his 58th birthday in Perth, Western Australia on 15 January 2016 from multiple myeloma. He had been diagnosed with the blood condition in mid-2010 and had undergone several bouts of chemotherapy treatment. He was laid to rest on 25 January in Perth.
