= Matthew Larkin =

Australian rules footballer

Personal information
- Full name: Matthew Larkin
- Born: 19 August 1964 (age 62)
- Original team: Boronia
- Height: 180 cm (5 ft 11 in)
- Weight: 90 kg (198 lb)

Playing career^{1}
Years	Club	Games (Goals)
1984–1993	North Melbourne	172 (143)
- ^{1} Playing statistics correct to the end of 1993.

Matthew Larkin (born 19 August 1964) is a former Australian rules footballer who played for the North Melbourne Football Club.

A midfielder, Larkin appeared 172 times for the Kangaroos in the VFL/AFL between 1984 and 1993. He captained the club for three seasons in the early 1990s.

From 1985 until 1988 he won three of the four North Melbourne best and fairest awards. He had been recruited from Boronia.
