= Brian Royal =

Australian rules footballer (born 1961)

Personal information
- Full name: Brian Royal
- Nickname: Choco
- Born: 12 December 1961 (age 64)
- Original team: Bairnsdale (LVFL)
- Height: 175 cm (5 ft 9 in)
- Weight: 79 kg (174 lb)
- Position: Rover

Playing career^{1}
Years	Club	Games (Goals)
1983–1993	Footscray	199 (299)
- ^{1} Playing statistics correct to the end of 1993.

Career highlights
- Charles Sutton Medal: 1983; All-Australian team: 1986

Brian Royal (born 12 December 1961) is a former Australian rules footballer who played for the Footscray Football Club (Western Bulldogs) in the Australian Football League (AFL).

In his first year for the Bulldogs, Royal won the Charles Sutton Medal, the Club's Best and Fairest award and went on to have an extremely distinguished career. Royal represented his state on seven occasions and was an All-Australian representative. His career came to an abrupt end on 199 games and 299 goals due to a ruptured Achilles tendon against Essendon late in the 1993 season.

Royal went on to enjoy a long career in coaching at AFL level, as a highly regarded assistant coach at several clubs, including Melbourne, St Kilda, Richmond and the Western Bulldogs – the last two with Terry Wallace as senior coach.

Royal is now coaching in the Victorian Amateur Football Association (VAFA), for the Beaumaris Football Club.
