= Ross Glendinning =

Australian rules footballer (born 1956)

Personal information
- Born: 17 September 1956 (age 70); Subiaco, Western Australia
- Height: 188 cm (6 ft 2 in)
- Weight: 89 kg (196 lb)

Playing career^{1}
| Years | Club | Games (Goals) |
| 1974–1977 | East Perth | 56 (2) |
| 1978–1986 | North Melbourne | 190 (214) |
| 1987–1988 | West Coast | 40 (111) |
| Total | | 286 (327) |

Representative team honours
| Years | Team | Games (Goals) |
| 1977–1988 | Western Australia | 15 (44) |
| | Victoria | 2 (0) |

Coaching career
| Years | Club | Games (W–L–D) |
| 1996–1997 | Western Australia | 2 (0) |
- ^{1} Playing statistics correct to the end of 1988.

Career highlights
- Brownlow Medal: (1983); 2× Syd Barker Medal: (1982, 1983); West Coast captain: (1987–1988); 2× West Coast leading goalkicker: (1987, 1988); All-Australian team: (1983); Australian Football Hall of Fame, inducted 2000; West Australian Football Hall of Fame, inducted 2004; North Melbourne Team of the Century (centre half-back)

Ross William Glendinning (born 17 September 1956) is a former Australian rules footballer who played for the East Perth Football Club in the West Australian National Football League (WANFL) and for the North Melbourne Football Club and the West Coast Eagles in the Victorian Football League (VFL).

Solidly built but agile and skilful in equal measure, Glendinning was considered one of the finest key-position players of his era. Inducted into the Australian Football Hall of Fame in 2000, he was West Coast's inaugural captain. The Ross Glendinning Medal is named in his honour and is awarded to the player judged best afield in the Western Australian derby between West Coast and Fremantle each AFL season.

== Playing career ==
Glendinning started his senior football career with East Perth in the Western Australian National Football League (WANFL). He joined under the father–son rule, his father Gus having played 69 games for the Royals from 1941 to 1951. Ross played 56 games for East Perth from 1974 to 1977.

He joined North Melbourne in 1978, after being denied a clearance from East Perth in 1977. He twice won the club's Best and Fairest award and in 1983, winning the Brownlow Medal after finishing second the previous year. Strongly built, he could play at centre half-forward or centre half-back.

When West Coast was formed in 1986, Glendinning returned to his home state and was appointed the club's inaugural captain. Playing mainly at centre half-forward, he was the club's leading goal kicker in 1987 and 1988.

== Post-football career ==
Following retirement, Glendinning was an expert commentator for Channel 7 from 1989 till 1998 while also serving as a panelist on the sportsworld football panel.

In March 2000, while serving as Fremantle's match committee chairman, Glendinning attracted attention for making remarks on television claiming Essendon's star full-forward Matthew Lloyd was suspect under physical pressure. Essendon coach Kevin Sheedy showed a video of the interview to his players in the lead-up to the match at Subiaco Oval. For the record, Essendon won the match by 36 points and would go on to claim the premiership at the end of the season, losing only one game along the way.

In recent years, Glendinning returned to the West Coast Eagles as corporate relations manager.

== Honours ==
Glendinning has been inducted into the WA Hall of Champions (1994), the Australian Football Hall of Fame (2000), the WA Football Hall of Fame (2004) and the North Melbourne Hall of Fame (2012). He was named at centre half-back in the North Melbourne Football Club's Team of the Century. In addition, the Ross Glendinning Medal is named in his honour and is awarded to the player judged best afield in the West Australian derby between West Coast and Fremantle each AFL season.

He was the coach of the Western Australia Australian rules football team in the 1996 and 1997 State of Origin matches against South Australia and The Allies, losing both games.

== Personal life ==
Glendinning is married to Kerry and has three daughters.
