= 1985 VFL season =

89th season of the Victorian Football League (VFL)

1985 VFL premiership season
- Teams: 12
- Premiers: Essendon; 14th premiership
- Minor premiers: Essendon; 12th minor premiership
- Night series: Hawthorn; 2nd Night series win
- Brownlow Medallist: Brad Hardie (Footscray)
- Coleman Medallist: Simon Beasley (Footscray)

Attendance
- Matches played: 138
- Total attendance: 3,113,173 (22,559 per match)
- Highest: 100,042

The 1985 VFL season was the 89th season of the Victorian Football League (VFL), the highest level senior Australian rules football competition in Victoria.

The season featured twelve clubs, ran from 23 March until 28 September, and comprised a 22-game home-and-away season followed by a finals series featuring the top five clubs. The season was the first to feature premiership matches on Friday nights.

The premiership was won by the Essendon Football Club for the 14th time and second time consecutively, after it defeated Hawthorn by 78 points in the 1985 VFL Grand Final.

== Night series ==
Hawthorn defeated Essendon 11.11 (77) to 10.8 (68) in the final.

== Home-and-away season ==
=== Round 1 ===
Home team	Home team score	Away team	Away team score	Venue	Crowd	Date
North Melbourne	15.13 (103)	Collingwood	21.15 (141)	MCG	65,628	29 March 1985
St Kilda	8.18 (66)	Sydney	26.20 (176)	Moorabbin Oval	20,910	30 March 1985
Essendon	21.11 (137)	Richmond	18.12 (120)	Windy Hill	22,802	30 March 1985
Carlton	17.10 (112)	Footscray	22.10 (142)	Princes Park	26,873	30 March 1985
Melbourne	20.8 (128)	Fitzroy	14.18 (102)	MCG	20,910	30 March 1985
Geelong	20.8 (128)	Hawthorn	14.16 (100)	VFL Park	20,776	30 March 1985

=== Round 2 ===
Home team	Home team score	Away team	Away team score	Venue	Crowd	Date
Richmond	12.16 (88)	Sydney	13.14 (92)	MCG	24,113	6 April 1985
Geelong	14.12 (96)	Collingwood	18.11 (119)	Kardinia Park	32,966	6 April 1985
St Kilda	2.17 (29)	Carlton	25.19 (169)	Moorabbin Oval	18,655	6 April 1985
Hawthorn	25.20 (170)	Melbourne	14.18 (102)	Princes Park	17,278	8 April 1985
Fitzroy	8.15 (63)	Essendon	24.22 (166)	Victoria Park	17,093	8 April 1985
Footscray	20.14 (134)	North Melbourne	16.12 (108)	VFL Park	24,056	8 April 1985

=== Round 3 ===
Home team	Home team score	Away team	Away team score	Venue	Crowd	Date
Essendon	17.12 (114)	Hawthorn	15.10 (100)	VFL Park	41,694	23 March 1985
Richmond	31.25 (211)	St Kilda	14.14 (98)	MCG	17,753	13 April 1985
Footscray	26.14 (170)	Geelong	16.9 (105)	Western Oval	23,259	13 April 1985
Collingwood	19.9 (123)	Melbourne	16.17 (113)	Victoria Park	22,896	13 April 1985
Carlton	22.13 (145)	North Melbourne	22.15 (147)	Princes Park	20,404	13 April 1985
Sydney	18.12 (120)	Fitzroy	26.15 (171)	SCG	10,204	14 April 1985

- The average score by each team this round was 134.8, which stands as the VFL/AFL record.
- The match between Essendon and Hawthorn was played as a standalone season opener as part of the celebrations of Victoria's sesquicentenary, with the teams playing for a silver cup presented by premier John Cain. The cup was similar in style to the VFL premiership cup, with engraving marking it as the "Premier's Trophy."

=== Round 4 ===
Home team	Home team score	Away team	Away team score	Venue	Crowd	Date
North Melbourne	16.15 (111)	St Kilda	11.6 (72)	MCG	12,895	20 April 1985
Fitzroy	12.14 (86)	Richmond	15.13 (103)	Victoria Park	11,056	20 April 1985
Carlton	24.17 (161)	Geelong	13.11 (89)	Princes Park	19,894	20 April 1985
Essendon	13.8 (86)	Collingwood	12.10 (82)	Windy Hill	26,550	20 April 1985
Melbourne	14.18 (102)	Footscray	12.11 (83)	VFL Park	20,797	20 April 1985
Sydney	5.14 (44)	Hawthorn	8.15 (63)	SCG	7,860	21 April 1985

=== Round 5 ===
Home team	Home team score	Away team	Away team score	Venue	Crowd	Date
Melbourne	18.13 (121)	Carlton	13.14 (92)	MCG	53,067	25 April 1985
St Kilda	19.12 (126)	Fitzroy	18.14 (122)	VFL Park	20,480	25 April 1985
Hawthorn	21.23 (149)	Richmond	29.14 (188)	Princes Park	17,268	27 April 1985
Geelong	16.23 (119)	North Melbourne	14.9 (93)	Kardinia Park	16,492	27 April 1985
Collingwood	15.15 (105)	Sydney	13.12 (90)	Victoria Park	23,306	27 April 1985
Footscray	18.17 (125)	Essendon	11.18 (84)	Western Oval	33,677	27 April 1985

=== Round 6 ===
Home team	Home team score	Away team	Away team score	Venue	Crowd	Date
Melbourne	20.11 (131)	North Melbourne	20.12 (132)	MCG	23,815	4 May 1985
Fitzroy	15.12 (102)	Hawthorn	19.16 (130)	Victoria Park	9,231	4 May 1985
St Kilda	16.12 (108)	Geelong	15.21 (111)	Moorabbin Oval	16,000	4 May 1985
Essendon	27.14 (176)	Carlton	8.19 (67)	Windy Hill	22,644	4 May 1985
Richmond	16.10 (106)	Collingwood	13.10 (88)	VFL Park	58,733	4 May 1985
Sydney	25.11 (161)	Footscray	11.17 (83)	SCG	9,537	5 May 1985

=== Round 7 ===
Home team	Home team score	Away team	Away team score	Venue	Crowd	Date
Hawthorn	28.15 (183)	St Kilda	8.9 (57)	Princes Park	8,762	11 May 1985
Geelong	12.13 (85)	Melbourne	5.10 (40)	Kardinia Park	15,000	11 May 1985
Collingwood	11.15 (81)	Fitzroy	25.10 (160)	Victoria Park	22,964	11 May 1985
Richmond	15.11 (101)	Footscray	23.13 (151)	MCG	36,250	11 May 1985
North Melbourne	22.20 (152)	Essendon	14.9 (93)	VFL Park	37,125	11 May 1985
Sydney	11.17 (83)	Carlton	12.16 (88)	SCG	12,507	12 May 1985

=== Round 8 ===
Home team	Home team score	Away team	Away team score	Venue	Crowd	Date
North Melbourne	11.8 (74)	Sydney	6.10 (46)	MCG	14,572	18 May 1985
Collingwood	8.9 (57)	Hawthorn	6.10 (46)	Victoria Park	20,731	18 May 1985
Carlton	11.18 (84)	Richmond	9.13 (67)	Princes Park	21,777	18 May 1985
Footscray	11.7 (73)	Fitzroy	12.15 (87)	Western Oval	16,952	18 May 1985
Geelong	8.11 (59)	Essendon	10.15 (75)	Kardinia Park	23,102	18 May 1985
Melbourne	16.10 (106)	St Kilda	7.12 (54)	VFL Park	16,282	18 May 1985

=== Round 9 ===
Home team	Home team score	Away team	Away team score	Venue	Crowd	Date
Essendon	23.15 (153)	Melbourne	9.17 (71)	Windy Hill	19,985	25 May 1985
Richmond	16.15 (111)	North Melbourne	18.19 (127)	MCG	31,347	25 May 1985
Hawthorn	17.24 (126)	Footscray	16.11 (107)	Princes Park	16,686	25 May 1985
St Kilda	20.17 (137)	Collingwood	24.18 (162)	Moorabbin Oval	22,348	25 May 1985
Fitzroy	19.9 (123)	Carlton	18.16 (124)	VFL Park	29,455	25 May 1985
Sydney	13.11 (89)	Geelong	16.21 (117)	SCG	12,577	26 May 1985

=== Round 10 ===
Home team	Home team score	Away team	Away team score	Venue	Crowd	Date
Melbourne	15.19 (109)	Sydney	14.8 (92)	MCG	16,749	1 June 1985
Fitzroy	17.15 (117)	North Melbourne	19.14 (128)	Victoria Park	11,333	1 June 1985
Carlton	9.14 (68)	Hawthorn	22.15 (147)	Princes Park	25,424	1 June 1985
St Kilda	18.12 (120)	Essendon	21.20 (146)	Moorabbin Oval	16,536	1 June 1985
Richmond	10.10 (70)	Geelong	18.12 (120)	VFL Park	24,849	1 June 1985
Footscray	16.10 (106)	Collingwood	12.8 (80)	MCG	45,408	2 June 1985

=== Round 11 ===
Home team	Home team score	Away team	Away team score	Venue	Crowd	Date
Melbourne	15.11 (101)	Richmond	17.19 (121)	MCG	31,606	8 June 1985
Footscray	15.21 (111)	St Kilda	13.12 (90)	Western Oval	17,538	8 June 1985
Essendon	17.11 (113)	Sydney	11.5 (71)	Windy Hill	17,652	8 June 1985
North Melbourne	17.11 (113)	Hawthorn	17.11 (113)	MCG	39,084	10 June 1985
Geelong	17.8 (110)	Fitzroy	20.21 (141)	Kardinia Park	20,000	10 June 1985
Collingwood	13.9 (87)	Carlton	16.14 (110)	VFL Park	56,604	10 June 1985

=== Round 12 ===
Home team	Home team score	Away team	Away team score	Venue	Crowd	Date
Collingwood	9.10 (64)	North Melbourne	14.17 (101)	Victoria Park	19,573	15 June 1985
Hawthorn	17.15 (117)	Geelong	13.10 (88)	Princes Park	11,377	15 June 1985
Richmond	10.9 (69)	Essendon	23.12 (150)	MCG	36,851	15 June 1985
Footscray	13.8 (86)	Carlton	5.9 (39)	Western Oval	20,707	15 June 1985
Fitzroy	11.15 (81)	Melbourne	6.11 (47)	VFL Park	14,668	15 June 1985
Sydney	23.21 (159)	St Kilda	13.14 (92)	SCG	7,811	16 June 1985

=== Round 13 ===
Home team	Home team score	Away team	Away team score	Venue	Crowd	Date
Essendon	21.14 (140)	Fitzroy	16.17 (113)	Windy Hill	18,398	22 June 1985
Collingwood	12.13 (85)	Geelong	13.13 (91)	Victoria Park	16,852	22 June 1985
Carlton	20.19 (139)	St Kilda	16.11 (107)	Princes Park	13,534	22 June 1985
Melbourne	12.9 (81)	Hawthorn	11.31 (97)	MCG	16,406	22 June 1985
North Melbourne	9.21 (75)	Footscray	11.11 (77)	VFL Park	22,319	22 June 1985
Sydney	19.23 (137)	Richmond	8.12 (60)	SCG	9,504	23 June 1985

=== Round 14 ===
Home team	Home team score	Away team	Away team score	Venue	Crowd	Date
North Melbourne	10.15 (75)	Carlton	22.19 (151)	MCG	32,861	28 June 1985
Fitzroy	13.17 (95)	Sydney	11.14 (80)	Victoria Park	9,953	29 June 1985
St Kilda	12.9 (81)	Richmond	17.15 (117)	Moorabbin Oval	14,243	29 June 1985
Geelong	17.22 (124)	Footscray	23.8 (146)	Kardinia Park	17,000	29 June 1985
Melbourne	12.13 (85)	Collingwood	23.19 (157)	MCG	29,154	29 June 1985
Hawthorn	15.11 (101)	Essendon	21.11 (137)	VFL Park	48,880	29 June 1985

=== Round 15 ===
	Round 15
Saturday, 6 July (2:10 pm)	Geelong 16.8 (104)	def. by	Carlton 19.16 (130)	Kardinia Park (crowd: 19,813)	Report
Saturday, 6 July (2:10 pm)	Collingwood 11.12 (78)	def. by	Essendon 13.11 (89)	Victoria Park (crowd: 26,014)	Report
Saturday, 6 July (2:10 pm)	Richmond 21.16 (142)	def.	Fitzroy 17.16 (118)	MCG (crowd: 19,794)	Report
Saturday, 6 July (2:10 pm)	Footscray 26.13 (169)	def.	Melbourne 6.13 (49)	Western Oval (crowd: 15,328)	Report
Saturday, 6 July (2:10 pm)	Hawthorn 23.18 (156)	def.	Sydney 12.11 (83)	Princes Park (crowd: 8,694)	Report
Saturday, 6 July (2:10 pm)	St Kilda 11.9 (75)	def. by	North Melbourne 21.13 (139)	VFL Park (crowd: 11,829)	Report
Footscray won their sixth consecutive game and recorded the biggest win in the club's history to date, in the 120-point thrashing of Melbourne. Full-forward Simon Beasley registered 10 or more goals for the third time in his career, ending up with 12 goals 3 behinds. The Bulldogs' record winning margin would stand until the 2021 AFL season.

=== Round 16 ===
Home team	Home team score	Away team	Away team score	Venue	Crowd	Date
Fitzroy	16.13 (109)	St Kilda	18.10 (118)	Victoria Park	8,735	13 July 1985
Richmond	17.11 (113)	Hawthorn	27.18 (180)	MCG	23,522	13 July 1985
Essendon	17.10 (112)	Footscray	13.10 (88)	Windy Hill	28,144	20 July 1985
North Melbourne	12.19 (91)	Geelong	20.11 (131)	MCG	17,686	20 July 1985
Carlton	14.15 (99)	Melbourne	5.9 (39)	VFL Park	17,920	20 July 1985
Sydney	17.21 (123)	Collingwood	29.11 (185)	SCG	12,172	21 July 1985

=== Round 17 ===
Home team	Home team score	Away team	Away team score	Venue	Crowd	Date
Geelong	14.18 (102)	St Kilda	12.9 (81)	Kardinia Park	11,989	27 July 1985
Footscray	15.15 (105)	Sydney	11.13 (79)	Western Oval	13,026	27 July 1985
Collingwood	13.8 (86)	Richmond	11.12 (78)	Victoria Park	20,336	27 July 1985
Carlton	18.12 (120)	Essendon	10.8 (68)	Princes Park	28,786	27 July 1985
North Melbourne	17.12 (114)	Melbourne	16.14 (110)	MCG	10,787	27 July 1985
Hawthorn	19.20 (134)	Fitzroy	8.14 (62)	VFL Park	13,197	27 July 1985

=== Round 18 ===
Home team	Home team score	Away team	Away team score	Venue	Crowd	Date
Essendon	25.16 (166)	North Melbourne	8.14 (62)	Windy Hill	18,894	3 August 1985
Carlton	19.13 (127)	Sydney	14.9 (93)	Princes Park	15,717	3 August 1985
St Kilda	13.16 (94)	Hawthorn	20.15 (135)	Moorabbin Oval	10,911	3 August 1985
Melbourne	12.14 (86)	Geelong	21.18 (144)	MCG	16,421	3 August 1985
Fitzroy	14.21 (105)	Collingwood	14.10 (94)	Victoria Park	15,958	3 August 1985
Footscray	25.16 (166)	Richmond	17.6 (108)	VFL Park	16,205	3 August 1985

=== Round 19 ===
Home team	Home team score	Away team	Away team score	Venue	Crowd	Date
Fitzroy	10.12 (72)	Footscray	12.5 (77)	Victoria Park	11,022	10 August 1985
St Kilda	7.8 (50)	Melbourne	8.11 (59)	Moorabbin Oval	11,779	10 August 1985
Hawthorn	15.6 (96)	Collingwood	8.16 (64)	Princes Park	15,799	10 August 1985
Richmond	11.14 (80)	Carlton	23.15 (153)	MCG	24,125	10 August 1985
Essendon	13.11 (89)	Geelong	8.16 (64)	VFL Park	34,614	10 August 1985
Sydney	12.22 (94)	North Melbourne	14.15 (99)	SCG	9,215	11 August 1985

=== Round 20 ===
Home team	Home team score	Away team	Away team score	Venue	Crowd	Date
North Melbourne	16.20 (116)	Richmond	9.12 (66)	Arden St Oval	7,341	17 August 1985
Geelong	13.13 (91)	Sydney	9.10 (64)	Kardinia Park	12,422	17 August 1985
Footscray	5.13 (43)	Hawthorn	5.8 (38)	Western Oval	21,828	17 August 1985
Carlton	12.15 (87)	Fitzroy	8.11 (59)	Princes Park	16,902	17 August 1985
Melbourne	15.7 (97)	Essendon	17.10 (112)	MCG	22,193	17 August 1985
Collingwood	17.18 (120)	St Kilda	9.15 (69)	VFL Park	15,709	17 August 1985

=== Round 21 ===
Home team	Home team score	Away team	Away team score	Venue	Crowd	Date
Essendon	27.22 (184)	St Kilda	14.7 (91)	Windy Hill	14,133	24 August 1985
Collingwood	9.10 (64)	Footscray	15.19 (109)	Victoria Park	21,724	24 August 1985
North Melbourne	17.22 (124)	Fitzroy	17.14 (116)	MCG	14,581	24 August 1985
Hawthorn	15.17 (107)	Carlton	12.12 (84)	Princes Park	31,484	24 August 1985
Geelong	12.7 (79)	Richmond	16.15 (111)	VFL Park	16,174	24 August 1985
Sydney	24.21 (165)	Melbourne	14.13 (97)	SCG	7,942	25 August 1985

=== Round 22 ===
Home team	Home team score	Away team	Away team score	Venue	Crowd	Date
Hawthorn	23.21 (159)	North Melbourne	14.11 (95)	Princes Park	16,449	31 August 1985
Fitzroy	14.13 (97)	Geelong	17.18 (120)	Victoria Park	9,120	31 August 1985
Richmond	20.12 (132)	Melbourne	13.13 (91)	MCG	17,158	31 August 1985
St Kilda	12.12 (84)	Footscray	8.18 (66)	Moorabbin Oval	14,236	31 August 1985
Carlton	12.9 (81)	Collingwood	11.9 (75)	VFL Park	37,027	31 August 1985
Sydney	11.12 (78)	Essendon	24.21 (165)	SCG	12,180	1 September 1985

== Ladder ==
(P)	Premiers
	Qualified for finals

#	Team	P	W	L	D	PF	PA	%	Pts
1	Essendon (P)	22	19	3	0	2755	1991	138.4	76
2	Footscray	22	16	6	0	2417	2000	120.9	64
3	Hawthorn	22	15	6	1	2647	2024	130.8	62
4	Carlton	22	15	7	0	2430	2104	115.5	60
5	North Melbourne	22	13	8	1	2379	2431	97.9	54
6	Geelong	22	12	10	0	2277	2263	100.6	48
7	Collingwood	22	10	12	0	2197	2180	100.8	40
8	Richmond	22	9	13	0	2362	2590	91.2	36
9	Fitzroy	22	7	15	0	2301	2452	93.8	28
10	Sydney	22	6	16	0	2219	2349	94.5	24
11	Melbourne	22	6	16	0	1965	2527	77.8	24
12	St Kilda	22	3	19	0	1899	2937	64.7	12

Rules for classification: 1. premiership points; 2. percentage; 3. points for
Average score: 105.5
Source: AFL Tables

== Finals series ==
=== Finals week 1 ===
	Elimination final
Saturday, 7 September (2:30 pm)	Carlton 16.11 (107)	def. by	North Melbourne 20.6 (126)	VFL Park (crowd: 49,126)	Report

	Qualifying final
Sunday, 8 September (2:30 pm)	Footscray 8.14 (62)	def. by	Hawthorn 22.23 (155)	MCG (crowd: 58,367)	Report

=== Finals week 2 ===
	Semi-finals
SF1: Sunday, 15 September (2:30 pm)	Footscray 19.23 (137)	def.	North Melbourne 16.11 (107)	MCG (crowd: 56,112)	Report
SF2: Saturday, 14 September (2:30 pm)	Essendon 14.18 (102)	def.	Hawthorn 9.8 (62)	VFL Park (crowd: 67,063)	Report

=== Preliminary final ===
	Preliminary final
Saturday, 21 September (2:30 pm)	Hawthorn 16.13 (109)	def.	Footscray 15.9 (99)	VFL Park (crowd: 55,246)	Report

=== Grand final ===
	Grand final
Saturday, 28 September (2:50 pm)	Essendon 26.14 (170)	def.	Hawthorn 14.8 (92)	MCG (crowd: 100,042)	Report
Essendon won its 14th VFL/AFL Premiership; This marked the third consecutive Grand final contested by Essendon and Hawthorn.; Essendon's last quarter score of 11 goals 3 behinds (69 points) beat the previous year's record last quarter score.; Kevin Sheedy won his second Jock McHale Medal.

== Season notes ==
- In the first three rounds, St Kilda set an unwanted record of three consecutive losses by 100 points (110, 140 and 113 points). Their percentage at the end of the round was only 34.7.
- In a televised reserves match between Collingwood and the Sydney Swans at the Lake Oval in South Melbourne on Sunday, 28 April, Collingwood reserves full-back John Bourke kicked Swans ruckman Patrick Foy in the groin in response to Foy tagging him throughout the game. As field umpire Phil Waight went to report Bourke for the incident, Bourke kicked and pushed Waight, then made contact with the Collingwood runner and jumped into the stands to attack a Swans fan before being escorted off the field. Bourke was found guilty at the Tribunal of kicking an umpire, kicking and assault, and was given the longest suspension in VFL/AFL history - 10 years plus 16 matches (239 matches), which was commuted in 1992 to six years plus 16 matches (151 matches). He was later charged with two counts of assault by Victoria Police, convicted on both counts in the Prahran Magistrates Court, and fined $2000 plus costs.
- In round 10, Geelong trailed at each change by 1, 10 and 13 points, but then kicked 11.5 (71) to 1.2 (8) in the last quarter to beat Richmond by 50 points. Their 50-point margin is the largest by a team outscored for each of the first three quarters.
- A violent brawl in the round 12 match between Hawthorn and Geelong led to veteran Hawthorn champion Leigh Matthews being charged with assaulting Geelong's Neville Bruns by Victoria Police.
- On the week of round 18, the Sydney Swans club was bought by Geoffrey Edelsten and became the first privately owned VFL club. Earlier in the season, Perth businessmen Alan Delany and John Watts had attempted to buy lowly St. Kilda and relocate them to Perth.
- In round 18, Essendon led North Melbourne 18.8 (116) to 2.4 (16) at half-time. This was the largest half-time lead since round 2 of 1931, when led by Richmond 17.9 (111) to North Melbourne's 0.5 (5).
- Collingwood player Andrew Witts wore jumper No. 65 during the first of his seven games with the Magpies – the highest regular jumper number in senior VFL/AFL history.
- In round 20, the Arden Street Oval hosted its last senior VFL match. The venue had been used by North Melbourne throughout its time in the VFL, except for 1965 when the club was based in Coburg. A total of 529 VFL senior matches were played at the ground that was formerly overshadowed by a massive gasometer on Macaulay Road.

== Awards ==
- The Leigh Matthews Trophy was awarded to Greg Williams of Geelong.
- The Norm Smith Medal was awarded to Simon Madden of Essendon.
- Hawthorn won the reserves premiership. Hawthorn 18.16 (114) defeated Carlton 16.12 (108) in the grand final, held as a curtain-raiser to the seniors Grand Final on 28 September at the Melbourne Cricket Ground.

== Sources ==
- 1985 VFL season at AFL Tables
- 1985 VFL season at Australian Football
