= 1975 VFL grand final =

Grand final of the 1975 Victorian Football League season

1975 VFL Grand Final

Hawthorn	North Melbourne
9.13 (67)	19.8 (122)
	1	2	3	4
HAW	2.2 (14)	5.6 (36)	7.7 (49)	9.13 (67)
NM	4.2 (26)	9.2 (56)	12.6 (78)	19.8 (122)
- Date: 27 September 1975
- Stadium: Melbourne Cricket Ground
- Attendance: 110,551
- Favourite: Hawthorn
- Umpires: Kevin Smith
- Coin toss won by: North Melbourne

Broadcast in Australia
- Network: Seven Network, ABC-TV
- Commentators: Mike Williamson; Lou Richards

The 1975 VFL grand final was an Australian rules football game contested between the North Melbourne Football Club and the Hawthorn Football Club, held at the Melbourne Cricket Ground in Melbourne on 27 September 1975. It was the 78th annual Grand Final of the Victorian Football League, staged to determine the premiers for the 1975 VFL season. The match, attended 110,551 spectators, was won by North Melbourne by a margin of 55 points, marking that club's first premiership victory and becoming the last of the 12 VFL teams to win a flag, 50 years after its debut season.

== Background ==
North Melbourne had finished runners up the previous season, having been defeated by Richmond in the 1974 VFL grand final, and were the only team never to have won a premiership. It was Hawthorn's first appearance in a grand final since defeating St Kilda in 1971.

North Melbourne lost six of the first nine games of the season before a form recovery which saw it win eleven of the next thirteen games. At the conclusion of the regular home-and-away season, Hawthorn finished first on the ladder with 17 wins and 5 losses, and North Melbourne had finished third (behind Carlton) with 14 wins and 8 losses.

In the finals series leading up to the grand final, North Melbourne defeated Carlton by 20 points in the qualifying final before being beaten by Hawthorn by 11 points in the second semi-final. They then met Richmond in the preliminary final which they won by 17 points to advance to the grand final. Hawthorn advanced straight to the grand final from their win in the second semi-final.

Hawthorn captain Peter Crimmins was not included Hawthorn's grand final team, having suffered testicular cancer through the year. He had not played a senior game since round 7, but declared himself fit having played after playing five reserves games, including one final. Both the selection committee and Hawthorn's supporters were divided over whether he should play, and ultimately the match committee decided against playing him, with coach John Kennedy admitting they were fearful a knock could affect him. As he explained later: "It was very hard, it was a unique situation ... Peter wanted to play. The committee was divided. He didn't play. We'll never know what might have happened if he had played."

== Teams ==
Hawthorn	North Melbourne

Hawthorn
B:	12 Peter Welsh	15 Kelvin Moore	6 Michael Moncrieff
HB:	1 Bohdan Jaworskyj	24 Peter Knights	20 Ian Bremner
C:	28 Stuart Trott	4 Kelvin Matthews	2 Geoff Ablett
HF:	32 Shane Murphy	14 Alan Martello	25 John Hendrie
F:	31 Bernie Jones	48 Michael Cooke	22 Barry Rowlings
Foll:	23 Don Scott (a/c)	17 Michael Tuck	3 Leigh Matthews
Res:	13 Leon Rice	30 Des Meagher	
Coach:	John Kennedy, Sr.		

North Melbourne
B:	34 Ross Henshaw	23 David Dench (vc)	38 Frank Gumbleton
HB:	8 Brent Crosswell	15 Malcolm Blight	5 John Rantall
C:	27 Keith Greig	11 John Burns	40 Peter Chisnall
HF:	20 Wayne Schimmelbusch	6 Arnold Briedis	4 Sam Kekovich
F:	28 Gary Farrant	2 Doug Wade	18 Paul Feltham
Foll:	22 Mick Nolan	32 Barry Davis (c)	44 Barry Cable
Res:	10 Barry Goodingham (dvc)	13 Gary Cowton	
Coach:	Ron Barassi		

Umpires

The umpiring panel for the match, comprising one field umpire, two boundary umpires and two goal umpires is given below. This was the last grand final with one field umpire officiating.

1975 VFL Grand Final umpires
Position			Emergency
Field:	Kevin Smith (1)		
Boundary:	Kevin Mitchell (5)	Geoffrey Willcox (2)	
Goal:	Leslie Robinson (3)	Richard Sankey (5)	

Numbers in brackets represent the number of grand finals umpired, including 1975.

== Match summary ==
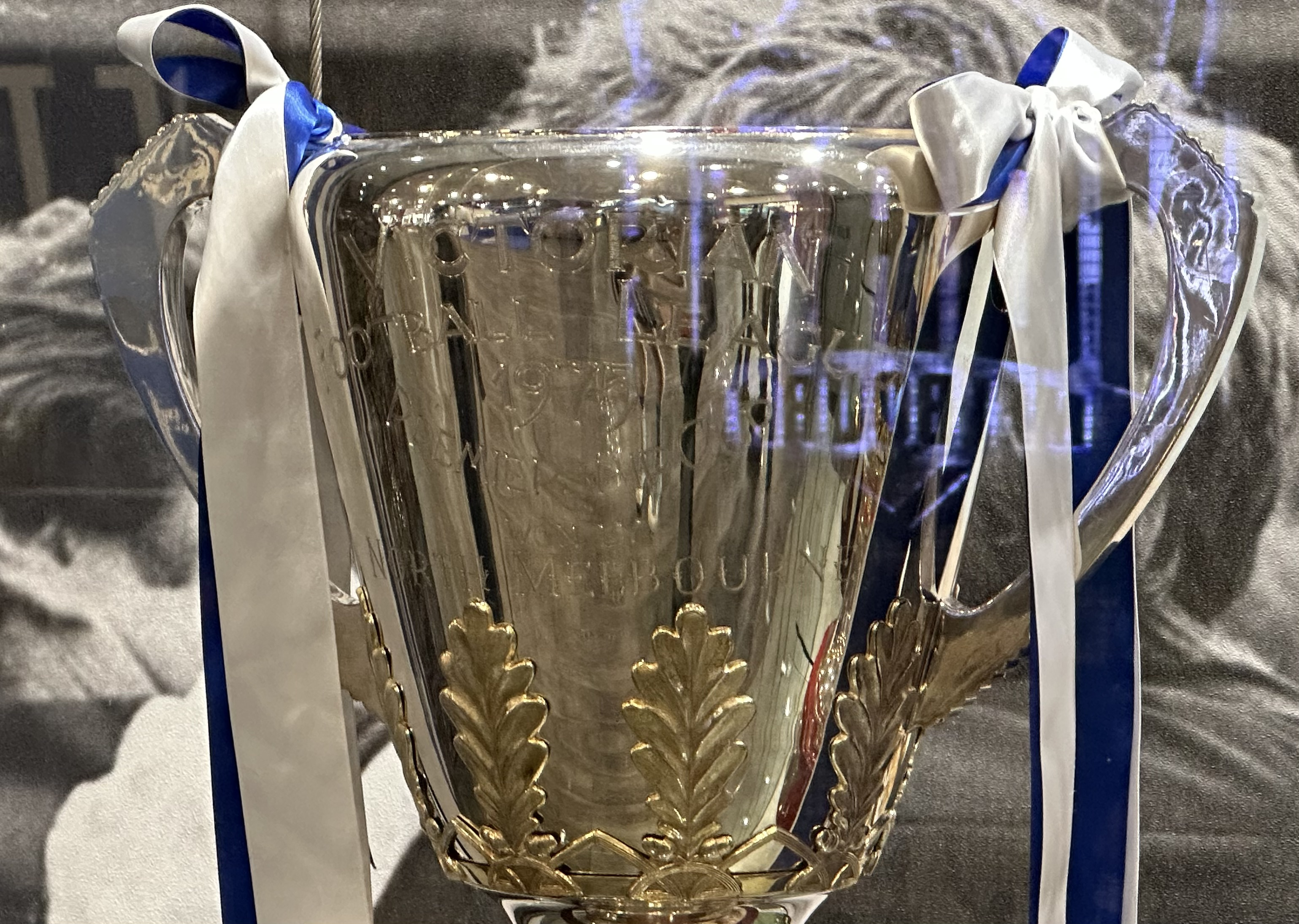
The 1975 VFL premiership trophy

North Melbourne was on top from the beginning of the game, accumulating nine goals by half time to Hawthorn's five. After half time, North Melbourne dominated, with its last six goals of the match extending the margin from 24 points to 61. The final winning margin of 55 points was the greatest in a grand final since 1957.

Contributing strongly for North Melbourne were Brent Crosswell, John Rantall, Keith Greig, John Burns, David Dench, Mick Nolan, Sam Kekovich and Doug Wade. Arnold Briedis was North Melbourne's leading goalkicker, kicking five goals. Peter Knights stood out for Hawthorn.

The selection of full-forward Michael Cooke proved to be disastrous for Hawthorn. He had made his senior debut in the second semi-final, kicking four goals for which he kept his spot in the side. However, Cooke struggled in the grand final and was replaced without managing a kick. He never played another senior game.

== Aftermath ==
For North Melbourne, it was the final league game for captain Barry Davis, full-forward Wade and the versatile Gary Farrant.
It was also the last time John Rantall played with North Melbourne as he returned to South Melbourne the following season.

Trailing by 20 points at half time, Hawthorn coach John Kennedy's famously delivered his "Don't think, do" speech, an impassioned plea to his players before the second half. As he recalled, "It was born out of desperation. We had some academics in the team who did a lot of thinking, so I, more or less in exasperation, said 'Don't think, do!" Although the speech failed to rouse his team to victory, it remains one of the most famous events in Kennedy's coaching career.

The 1975 match was the first of three grand finals played between Hawthorn and North Melbourne over a four year period, the others played in 1976 and 1978.

== Scorecard ==
Grand final
Saturday, 27 September (2:30 pm)	Hawthorn	def. by	North Melbourne	Melbourne Cricket Ground (crowd: 110,551)	Report
2.2 (14); 5.6 (36); 7.7 (49); 9.13 (67)	Q1; Q2; Q3; Final	4.2 (26); 9.2 (56); 12.6 (78); 19.8 (122)	Umpires: Smith; Television broadcast: Seven Network, ABC TV
Martello, Moncrieff 2 Rowlings, K Matthews, Trott, Meagher, Scott '1	Goals	5 Briedis; 4 Burns, Wade; 2 Schimmelbusch; 1 Kekovich, Crosswell, Blight, Feltham
Knights, Martello, Bremner, Moore, Jaworskyj, Scott	Best	Rantall, Crosswell, Greig, Burns, Dench, Cable, Henshaw, Chisnall, Kekovich
Moore (ankle)	Injuries	Nil
Welsh (striking)	Reports	Chisnall (striking)
Gate takings: $308,172 (record)

== Bibliography ==
- Atkinson, Graeme; Atkinson, Brant (2009). The Complete Book of AFL Finals (4th ed.). Scoresby, Victoria: The Five Mile Press. ISBN 9781742112756.
- Hutchinson, G. & Ross, J. (eds), The Clubs: The Complete History of Every Club in the VFL/AFL, Viking, (Ringwood), 1998. ISBN 0 670 87858 8
- Ross, J. (ed), 100 Years of Australian Football 1897–1996: The Complete Story of the AFL, All the Big Stories, All the Great Pictures, All the Champions, Every AFL Season Reported, Viking, (Ringwood), 1996. ISBN 0-670-86814-0

== See also ==
- 1975 VFL season
