= 1976 VFL grand final =

Grand final of the 1976 Victorian Football League season

1976 VFL Grand Final

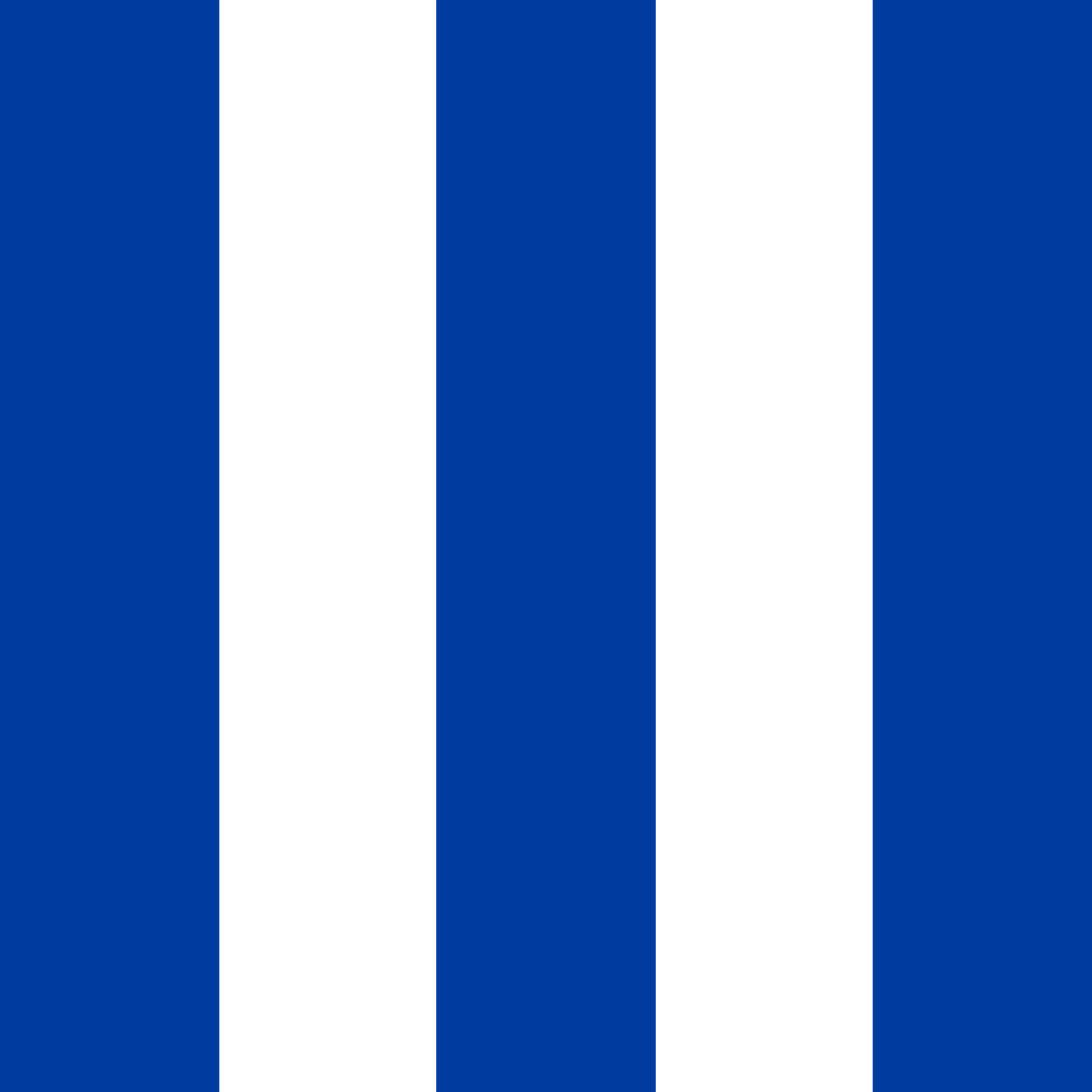
Hawthorn	North Melbourne
13.22 (100)	10.10 (70)
	1	2	3	4
HAW	5.6 (36)	9.12 (66)	10.18 (78)	13.22 (100)
NM	4.2 (26)	7.5 (47)	10.8 (68)	10.10 (70)
- Date: 25 September 1976
- Stadium: Melbourne Cricket Ground
- Attendance: 110,143
- Umpires: Kevin Smith, Bill Deller

Accolades
- Jock McHale Medallist: John Kennedy Sr.

Broadcast in Australia
- Network: Seven Network
- Commentators: Mike Williamson; Lou Richards

The 1976 VFL grand final was an Australian rules football game contested between the Hawthorn Football Club and North Melbourne Football Club at the Melbourne Cricket Ground on 25 September 1976. It was the 79th annual grand final of the Victorian Football League, staged to determine the premiers for the 1976 VFL season. The match, attended by 110,143 spectators, was won by Hawthorn by a margin of 30 points, marking that club's third premiership victory.

== Background ==
This was the third of five successive grand final appearances for North Melbourne, and North Melbourne was the reigning premier after having defeated Hawthorn in the 1975 VFL grand final.

At the conclusion of the home-and-away season, Hawthorn had finished second (behind Carlton) on the ladder with 16 wins and 6 losses. North Melbourne had finished third with 15 wins and 7 losses. During the season Hawthorn played North Melbourne in two home and away games, winning by 22 and 8 points respectively.

In the finals series leading up to the grand final, North Melbourne lost to Hawthorn by 20 points in the qualifying final before defeating Geelong by 33 points in the first semi-final. They then met Carlton in the preliminary final which they won by one point to advance to the grand final. Hawthorn, after their win in the qualifying final, defeated Carlton by 17 points in the second semi-final to advance to the grand final.

== Teams ==
Hawthorn	North Melbourne

Hawthorn
B:	11 Brian Douge	15 Kelvin Moore	31 Bernie Jones
HB:	20 Ian Bremner	24 Peter Knights	8 David O'Halloran
C:	2 Geoff Ablett	22 Barry Rowlings	26 Rodney Eade
HF:	10 David Polkinghorne	14 Alan Martello	4 Kelvin Matthews
F:	6 Michael Moncrieff	25 John Hendrie	19 Alan Goad
Foll:	23 Don Scott (c)	17 Michael Tuck	3 Leigh Matthews (vc)
Res:	13 Leon Rice	43 Peter Murnane	
Coach:	John Kennedy, Sr.		

North Melbourne
B:	21 John Byrne	23 David Dench (vc)	30 Frank Gumbleton
HB:	36 Steven Icke	13 Gary Cowton	5 Darryl Sutton
C:	18 Paul Feltham	11 John Burns	27 Keith Greig (c)
HF:	20 Wayne Schimmelbusch (dvc)	28 Terry Moore	15 Malcolm Blight
F:	1 Peter Keenan	8 Brent Crosswell	17 Graham Melrose
Foll:	22 Mick Nolan	7 Mark Dawson	9 Barry Cable
Res:	34 Ross Henshaw	40 Peter Chisnall	
Coach:	Ron Barassi		

Umpires

The umpiring panel for the match, comprising two field umpires, two boundary umpires and two goal umpires is given below. This was the first VFL grand final to feature two field umpires.

1976 VFL Grand Final umpires
Position			Emergency
Field:	Bill Deller (2)	Kevin Smith (2)	
Boundary:	Howard Fox (1)	Kevin Mitchell (6)	
Goal:	Kevin Barker (1)	Brian Pratt (1)	

Numbers in brackets represent the number of grand finals umpired, including 1976.

== Match summary ==
North Melbourne went into the match with a defensive gameplan; captain Keith Greig was minding Hawthorn's dangerous rover Leigh Matthews, and similarly attacking-minded players Malcolm Blight and Steven Icke also found themselves playing in defence. Hawthorn started the better, with Leigh Matthews kicking the first goal of the game after five minutes. Late in the first quarter, Matthews struck Greig on the forehead sending him to the ground, and was reported. Greig was knocked out again later in the match, yet in spite of these heavy blows still played well enough to be among North Melbourne's best players on the day.

The second quarter was for the most part even as both sides went goal for goal, but Kelvin Matthews and captain Don Scott kicked vital goals to give Hawthorn a 19-point lead at half time. Had they kicked for goal more accurately – star forward John Hendrie was especially inaccurate, kicking one goal and six behinds for the match – Hawthorn could easily have opened a six-goal lead.

After 10 minutes of the third quarter, North Melbourne coach Ron Barassi made the move of substituting Brent Crosswell on for Peter Keenan, which immediately provided North Melbourne with a forward target. Hawthorn continued to be inaccurate in the forward line, kicking one goal and six behinds for the quarter, and by three-quarter time North Melbourne and managed to close the margin to just ten points.

In the final quarter, Hawthorn kept North Melbourne goalless. Greig suffered another heavy blow from Matthews, while Peter Knights and David O'Halloran each took big marks for Hawthorn. Hawthorn added three goals for the quarter and eventually ran out 30-point winners. It was the club's third premiership win under coach John Kennedy.

== Aftermatch ==
Hawthorn's win was dedicated to former captain Peter Crimmins, who was dying from cancer at just 28. Before the game, Crimmins sent a telegram which Kennedy read to the team:

"Good luck to you and all the boys. It will be a long, hard, 100 minutes but I am sure you will be there at the end. Regards, Peter Crimmins."

Kennedy implored his players to "Do it for the little fella", and later stated that he believed his team was never going to lose. The night of the grand final, some players took the premiership cup to Crimmins' house to let him share in the celebrations. A press photographer accompanied them, and a famous photo was published in the newspapers showing a wasted, reclining, yet beaming Crimmins holding the premiership cup surrounded by his jubilant teammates. The victory became popularly known as 'Crimmo's Cup' in recognition of the inspiration Crimmins provided to his team. Crimmins died just three days after the game, aged 28.

This was Kennedy's last game as Hawthorn coach. He was later appointed coach of North Melbourne in 1985, and in his five seasons there he coached the club to the finals twice.

The 1976 grand final was North Melbourne's third of five consecutive grand finals, while Hawthorn's next appearance in a grand final was two years later (again against North Melbourne), in 1978.

== Match Scorecard and Details ==
1976 VFL grand final
Saturday, 25 September 2:30pm	Hawthorn	def.	North Melbourne	MCG (crowd: 110,143)
5.6 (36); 9.12 (66); 10.18 (78); 13.22 (100)	Q1; Q2; Q3; Final	4.2 (26); 7.5 (47); 10.8 (68); 10.10 (70)	Umpires: Smith, Deller; Television broadcast: Seven Network
3 Moncrieff; 2 K. Matthews, Hendrie, Goad; 1 L. Matthews, Scott, Rowlings, Martello	Goals	2 Cable, Icke, Burns; 1 Cowton, Byrne, Moore, Melrose
Knights, Hendrie, Douge, Rowlings	Best	Dench, Greig, Cable, Icke, Blight
L. Matthews for striking Greig	Reports

== Bibliography ==
- Atkinson, Graeme; Atkinson, Brant (2009). The Complete Book of AFL Finals. Scoresby: The Five Mile Press. ISBN 978-1-74211-275-6.
- Ross, J. (ed), 100 Years of Australian Football 1897–1996: The Complete Story of the AFL, All the Big Stories, All the Great Pictures, All the Champions, Every AFL Season Reported, Viking, (Ringwood), 1996. ISBN 0-670-86814-0

== See also ==
- 1976 VFL season
- Peter Crimmins
