= 1984 Hawthorn Football Club season =

60th season in the Victorian Football League

Hawthorn Football Club
1984 season
- President: Ron Cook
- Coach: Allan Jeans
- Captain: Leigh Matthews
- Home ground: Princes Park
- VFL season: 17–5 (2nd)
- Finals series: Grand Final (lost to Essendon 81–105)
- Best and Fairest: Russell Greene
- Leading goalkicker: Leigh Matthews (77)
- Highest home attendance: 92,685 (Grand Final vs. Essendon)
- Lowest home attendance: 11,178 (Round 15 vs. Footscray)
- Average home attendance: 28,459

The 1984 season was the Hawthorn Football Club's 60th season in the Victorian Football League and 83rd overall. Hawthorn entered the season as the defending VFL Premiers. Hawthorn qualified for their third consecutive finals series. Hawthorn qualified for their second consecutive Grand Final. It was the second time they advanced to the Grand Final in two consecutive seasons since 1976. They faced Essendon in a rematch of last years Grand Final with a chance to repeat as premiers. Hawthorn led 68–45 at 3-quarter time but Essendon kicked 9 goals to 2 in the fourth quarter to run over the top and win 105–81. This was their first Grand Final loss since 1975.

== Fixture ==
=== Premiership season ===
**Rd**	**Date and local time**	**Opponent**	**Scores** (Hawthorn's scores indicated in **bold**)			**Venue**	**Attendance**	**Record**
**Rd**	**Date and local time**	**Opponent**	Home	Away	Result	**Venue**	**Attendance**	**Record**
1	Saturday, 31 March (2:10 pm)	Sydney	**17.22 (124)**	13.11 (89)	Won by 35 points	Princes Park (H)	14,369	1–0
2	Saturday, 7 April (2:10 pm)	Essendon	16.14 (110)	**17.14 (116)**	Won by 6 points	Windy Hill (A)	22,841	2–0
3	Saturday, 14 April (2:10 pm)	Melbourne	20.12 (132)	**20.18 (138)**	Won by 6 points	Melbourne Cricket Ground (A)	25,557	3–0
4	Monday, 23 April (2:10 pm)	St Kilda	**23.21 (159)**	14.15 (99)	Won by 60 points	Princes Park (H)	14,125	4–0
5	Saturday, 28 April (2:10 pm)	Footscray	13.16 (94)	**22.9 (141)**	Won by 47 points	Western Oval (A)	19,988	5–0
6	Saturday, 5 May (2:10 pm)	Richmond	**11.15 (81)**	17.18 (120)	Lost by 39 points	VFL Park (H)	31,259	5–1
7	Saturday, 12 May (2:10 pm)	Fitzroy	**20.15 (135)**	16.8 (104)	Won by 31 points	Princes Park (H)	14,134	6–1
8	Saturday, 19 May (2:10 pm)	Carlton	12.11 (83)	**23.13 (151)**	Won by 68 points	Princes Park (A)	31,944	7–1
9	Saturday, 26 May (2:10 pm)	North Melbourne	**21.17 (143)**	13.8 (86)	Won by 57 points	Princes Park (H)	12,975	8–1
10	Saturday, 2 June (2:10 pm)	Geelong	17.11 (113)	**11.19 (85)**	Lost by 28 points	Kardinia Park (A)	14,290	8–2
11	Monday, 11 June (2:10 pm)	Collingwood	14.8 (92)	**18.16 (124)**	Won by 32 points	VFL Park (A)	62,339	9–2
12	Saturday, 16 July (2:10 pm)	Essendon	**12.21 (93)**	6.10 (46)	Won by 47 points	Princes Park (H)	25,726	10–2
13	Saturday, 23 June (2:10 pm)	Melbourne	**13.12 (90)**	15.17 (107)	Lost by 17 points	Princes Park (H)	20,422	10–3
14	Saturday, 30 June (2:10 pm)	St Kilda	4.6 (30)	**19.20 (134)**	Won by 104 points	Moorabbin Oval (A)	12,523	11–3
15	Saturday, 7 July (2:10 pm)	Footscray	**16.14 (110)**	10.16 (76)	Won by 34 points	Princes Park (H)	11,178	12–3
16	Saturday, 14 July (2:10 pm)	Richmond	14.13 (97)	**28.17 (185)**	Won by 88 points	VFL Park (A)	27,274	13–3
17	Saturday, 28 July (2:10 pm)	Fitzroy	11.11 (77)	**10.7 (67)**	Lost by 10 points	Junction Oval (A)	6,920	13–4
18	Saturday, 4 August (2:10 pm)	Carlton	**21.14 (140)**	16.12 (108)	Won by 32 points	Princes Park (H)	23,368	14–4
19	Saturday, 11 August (2:10 pm)	North Melbourne	17.20 (122)	**7.9 (51)**	Lost by 71 points	Arden Street Oval (A)	8,274	14–5
20	Sunday, 19 August (2:10 pm)	Sydney	11.19 (85)	**25.24 (174)**	Won by 89 points	Sydney Cricket Ground (A)	8,276	15–5
21	Saturday, 25 August (2:10 pm)	Collingwood	**16.23 (119)**	15.14 (104)	Won by 15 points	Princes Park (H)	22,173	16–5
22	Saturday, 1 September (2:10 pm)	Geelong	**25.14 (164)**	14.11 (95)	Won by 69 points	VFL Park (H)	31,609	17–5

=== Finals series ===
**Rd**	**Date and local time**	**Opponent**	**Scores** (Hawthorn's scores indicated in **bold**)			**Venue**	**Attendance**
**Rd**	**Date and local time**	**Opponent**	Home	Away	Result	**Venue**	**Attendance**
Qualifying final	Saturday, 8 September (2:30 pm)	Carlton	**18.14 (122)**	13.14 (92)	Won by 30 points	VFL Park (H)	55,947
2nd semi-final	Sunday, 16 September (2:30 pm)	Essendon	15.15 (105)	**16.17 (113)**	Won by 8 points	Melbourne Cricket Ground (A)	76,514
Grand Final	Saturday, 29 September (2:50 pm)	Essendon	**12.9 (81)**	14.21 (105)	Lost by 24 points	Melbourne Cricket Ground (H)	92,685

== Ladder ==
(P)	Premiers
	Qualified for finals

#	Team	P	W	L	D	PF	PA	%	Pts
1	Essendon (P)	22	18	4	0	2556	1994	128.2	72
2	Hawthorn	22	17	5	0	2724	2069	131.7	68
3	Carlton	22	13	9	0	2332	2014	115.8	52
4	Collingwood	22	13	9	0	2260	2072	109.1	52
5	Fitzroy	22	11	11	0	2405	2345	102.6	44
6	Geelong	22	11	11	0	2112	2239	94.3	44
7	Footscray	22	11	11	0	1992	2123	93.8	44
8	Richmond	22	10	12	0	2157	2373	90.9	40
9	Melbourne	22	9	13	0	2328	2233	104.3	36
10	Sydney	22	9	13	0	2223	2522	88.1	36
11	North Melbourne	22	5	17	0	2174	2661	81.7	20
12	St Kilda	22	5	17	0	1904	2522	75.5	20

Rules for classification: 1. premiership points; 2. percentage; 3. points for
Average score: 102.9
Source: AFL Tables
