= 1977 Hawthorn Football Club season =

53rd season in the Victorian Football League

Hawthorn Football Club
1977 season
- President: Phil J. Ryan
- Coach: David Parkin
- Captain: Don Scott
- Home ground: Princes Park
- VFL season: 17–5 (2nd)
- Finals series: Preliminary Final (lost to North Melbourne 45–112)
- Best and Fairest: Leigh Matthews
- Leading goalkicker: Peter Hudson (110)
- Highest home attendance: 64,048 (Semi-final vs. North Melbourne)
- Lowest home attendance: 8,234 (Round 16 vs. Fitzroy)
- Average home attendance: 27,217

The 1977 season was the Hawthorn Football Club's 53rd season in the Victorian Football League and 76th overall. Hawthorn entered the season as the defending VFL Premiers. Hawthorn qualified for finals for the fourth consecutive season. Hawthorn were eliminated by North Melbourne in the Preliminary final 45–112.

== Fixture ==
=== Premiership season ===
Rd	Date and local time	Opponent	Scores (Hawthorn's scores indicated in bold)			Venue	Attendance	Record
Rd	Date and local time	Opponent	Home	Away	Result	Venue	Attendance	Record
1	Saturday, 2 April (2:10 pm)	North Melbourne	**13.14 (92)**	23.14 (152)	Lost by 60 points	Princes Park (H)	20,943	0–1
2	Monday, 11 April (2:10 pm)	Richmond	19.6 (120)	**17.17 (119)**	Lost by 1 point	Melbourne Cricket Ground (A)	42,192	0–2
3	Saturday, 16 April (2:10 pm)	Geelong	6.14 (50)	**15.15 (105)**	Won by 55 points	Kardinia Park (A)	19,548	1–2
4	Saturday, 23 April (2:10 pm)	Carlton	**13.18 (96)**	12.11 (83)	Won by 13 points	Princes Park (H)	30,505	2–2
5	Saturday, 30 April (2:10 pm)	Fitzroy	12.14 (86)	**21.16 (142)**	Won by 56 points	Junction Oval (A)	10,428	3–2
6	Saturday, 7 May (2:10 pm)	St Kilda	**25.41 (191)**	16.7 (103)	Won by 88 points	Princes Park (H)	12,698	4–2
7	Saturday, 14 May (2:10 pm)	Footscray	8.13 (61)	**20.11 (131)**	Won by 70 points	Western Oval (A)	17,935	5–2
8	Saturday, 21 May (2:10 pm)	South Melbourne	7.13 (55)	**18.7 (115)**	Won by 60 points	Lake Oval (A)	11,443	6–2
9	Saturday, 28 May (2:10 pm)	Collingwood	**16.12 (108)**	22.10 (142)	Lost by 34 points	Princes Park (H)	35,042	6–3
10	Saturday, 4 June (2:10 pm)	Melbourne	16.19 (115)	**19.13 (127)**	Won by 12 points	Melbourne Cricket Ground (A)	21,586	7–3
11	Monday, 13 June (2:10 pm)	Essendon	**23.25 (163)**	8.9 (57)	Won by 106 points	Princes Park (H)	26,770	8–3
12	Saturday, 18 June (2:10 pm)	North Melbourne	6.11 (47)	**6.12 (48)**	Won by 1 point	Arden Street Oval (A)	9,027	9–3
13	Saturday, 25 June (2:10 pm)	Richmond	**9.12 (66)**	7.10 (52)	Won by 14 points	VFL Park (H)	34,820	10–3
14	Saturday, 2 July (2:10 pm)	Carlton	9.8 (62)	**7.6 (48)**	Lost by 14 points	Princes Park (A)	26,363	10–4
15	Saturday, 9 July (2:10 pm)	Geelong	**28.23 (191)**	13.6 (84)	Won by 107 points	Princes Park (H)	10,016	11–4
16	Saturday, 16 July (2:10 pm)	Fitzroy	**20.14 (134)**	11.12 (78)	Won by 56 points	Princes Park (H)	8,234	12–4
17	Saturday, 23 July (2:10 pm)	St Kilda	11.11 (77)	**24.19 (163)**	Won by 86 points	VFL Park (A)	20,469	13–4
18	Saturday, 30 July (2:10 pm)	Footscray	**18.10 (118)**	15.14 (104)	Won by 14 points	Princess Park (H)	10,348	14–4
19	Saturday, 6 August (2:10 pm)	South Melbourne	**10.18 (78)**	16.7 (103)	Lost by 25 points	VFL Park (H)	30,253	14–5
20	Saturday, 13 August (2:10 pm)	Collingwood	13.21 (99)	**15.15 (105)**	Won by 6 points	Victoria Park (A)	33,558	15–5
21	Saturday, 20 August (2:10 pm)	Melbourne	**16.14 (110)**	14.15 (99)	Won by 11 points	Princes Park (H)	8,880	16–5
22	Saturday, 27 August (2:10 pm)	Essendon	19.16 (130)	**25.18 (168)**	Won by 38 points	Windy Hill (A)	14,325	17–5

=== Finals Series ===
Rd	Date and local time	Opponent	Scores (Hawthorn's scores indicated in bold)			Venue	Attendance
Rd	Date and local time	Opponent	Home	Away	Result	Venue	Attendance
Qualifying final	Saturday, 3 September (2:30 pm)	North Melbourne	**19.11 (125)**	12.15 (87)	Won by 38 points	Melbourne Cricket Ground (H)	64,068
Second semi-final	Saturday, 10 September (2:30 pm)	Collingwood	17.10 (112)	**16.14 (110)**	Lost by 2 points	Melbourne Cricket Ground (A)	87,421
Preliminary final	Saturday, 17 September (2:30 pm)	North Melbourne	**5.15 (45)**	16.16 (112)	Lost by 67 points	VFL Park (H)	61,242

== Ladder ==
(P)	Premiers
	Qualified for finals

#	Team	P	W	L	D	PF	PA	%	Pts
1	Collingwood	22	18	4	0	2560	1959	130.7	72
2	Hawthorn	22	17	5	0	2618	1959	133.6	68
3	North Melbourne (P)	22	15	7	0	2124	1803	117.8	60
4	Richmond	22	14	7	1	2370	2085	113.7	58
5	South Melbourne	22	13	8	1	2148	1942	110.6	54
6	Carlton	22	13	9	0	2081	1859	111.9	52
7	Footscray	22	10	11	1	2170	2141	101.4	42
8	Geelong	22	8	14	0	1930	2333	82.7	32
9	Essendon	22	7	14	1	2085	2518	82.8	30
10	Fitzroy	22	6	16	0	2072	2474	83.8	24
11	Melbourne	22	5	17	0	2117	2492	85.0	20
12	St Kilda	22	3	17	2	1966	2676	73.5	16

Rules for classification: 1. premiership points; 2. percentage; 3. points for
Average score: 99.4
Source: AFL Tables
