= De La Salle College, Malvern =

De La Salle College

Location
- 1318 High Street; 9 Northbrook Avenue; Malvern, Victoria 3144; Australia
- 37°51′21″S 145°1′55″E

Information
- Type: Independent, single-sex
- Motto: Latin: Deo Duce (With God As Leader)
- Denomination: Roman Catholic (Lasallian)
- Established: 1912
- Principal: Michael Iliott
- Years: 7–12
- Gender: Boys
- Colours: Blue and gold
- Affiliation: Associated Catholic Colleges
- Website: www.delasalle.vic.edu.au

De La Salle College Malvern is a Catholic independent school for boys in the Melbourne suburb of Malvern, established in 1912 by the De La Salle Brothers, a religious order based on the teachings of Jean-Baptiste de la Salle. The college is a member of the Associated Catholic Colleges and is on two campuses (Tiverton and Kinnoull) located in Malvern.

== Timeline ==
- 1911 – Father Simon Hegarty CM, parish priest of Malvern, announced that a boys school was to be established, conducted by the Brothers of Christian Schools.

Father Simon Hegarty

- 1912 – On 4 February, Brother Dunstan Drumm, Brother Leopold Loughran and Brother Jerome Foley arrived in Melbourne from Waterford, Ireland. The following day, they commenced teaching 54 boys in the Parish Hall. On Easter Tuesday, Archbishop Thomas Carr blessed the new school in Stanhope Street, Armadale.
- 1926 – The Brothers were operating a junior (primary), senior and boarding school. The first edition of the college magazine Blue and Gold was published, and the first student to complete his leaving certificate finished.
- 1929 – The house Manresa on the corner of Stanhope Street and Dalny Street was purchased and the Tower Building was erected, and later blessed and opened by Archbishop Daniel Mannix. The old Stanhope Street, Armadale building was sold to the Melbourne and Metropolitan Tramways Trust. The Old Collegians' Association was formed.

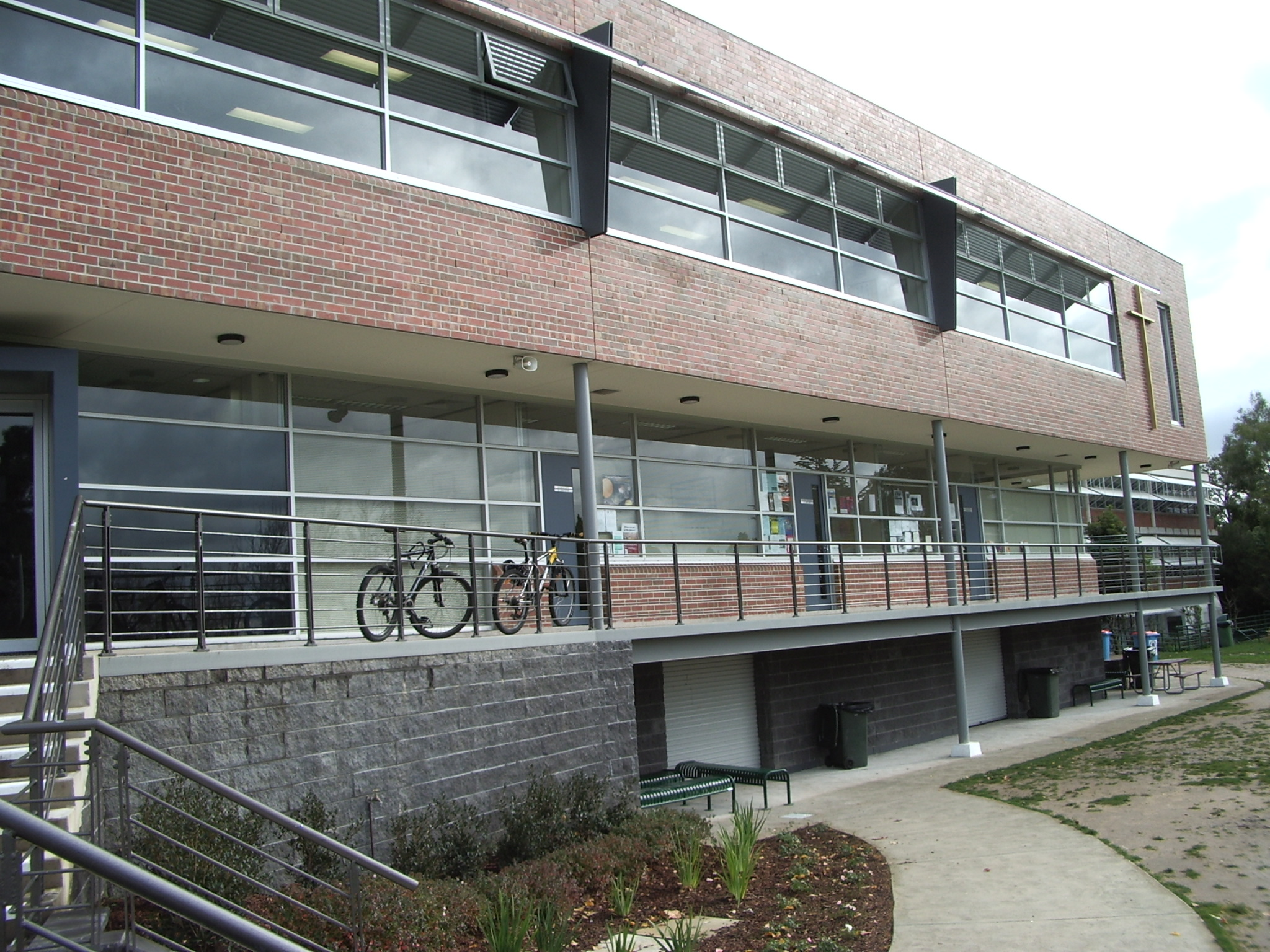
The Old Collegians Wing

- 1937 – The boarding school closed with many boarders enrolling at St Bede's College, established in 1938 in Mentone by the De La Salle Brothers.
- 1944 – Two-classroom buildings on the corner of Stanhope Street and Dalny Street was constructed on the site of a tennis court.
- 1946 – The Old Collegians' Association was reformed after it lapsed during the Second World War.
- 1947 – Robert Myers, a 14-year-old student, was shot and killed at Puckapunyal during simulated cadet night battle. The coroner delivered an open finding.
- 1948 – The World War II shrine was erected on Stanhope Street.
- 1954 – On 21 March, Archbishop Mannix officially opened Kinnoull (named after Kinnoull Hill), the then preparatory school for the College.
- 1959 – Gardens to the east of the homestead Kinnoull were removed to create what is now known as Kinnoull Oval.
- 1960 – The new senior school, on High Street, now the Brother Oswald Murdoch Building, was erected. The Fathers' Association was formed.
- 1962 – The former Gymnasium and Hall, now the Performing Arts Centre, was erected.
- 1967 – Kinnoull homestead was demolished.
- 1969 – Paul Jackson was expelled for distributing anti-war leaflets outside the College.
- 1972 – Manresa was demolished and the Brothers moved to a new residence on High Street. The now Brother Jerome Foley Library and the now Brother Dunstan Drumm Administration building was opened on High Street. Father Les Troy, CM, was appointed College Chaplain.
- 1983 – The Lasallian Award was introduced by the Old Collegians' Association.
- 1984 – The Brother Peter Duffy Memorial Building was opened and the Kinnoull Campus became the Senior School for Years 11 and 12.
- 1987 – The Brother Stanislaus Carmody Centre for the Arts and Technology was opened.
- 1988 – The Brother James Taylor Gymnasium was opened.
- 1990 – The Brother Damian Harvey Building was opened.
- 1995 – The High Street campus was renamed, Tiverton, after the former Brothers' residence on Stanhope Street (which, in turn, was named after Tiverton, Devonshire).
- 2004 – The Old Collegians' building was opened on the Kinnoull campus and the Year 10 students move to that campus.
- 2007 – The Old Collegians' Association executive committee was reformed.
- 2009 – The St Miguel Theatre and Peppercorn Café attached to the Brother Adrian Fitzgerald Building (colloquially known as the Chapel Building) was opened.
- 2012 – Centenary celebrations and publication of a pictorial history "With Faith and Zeal Resplendent" by Nicholas Quin and Steven Stefanopoulos.
- 2014 – The College's first lay principal Peter Houlihan, was appointed.
- 2019 – The third Campus, Holy Eucharist was opened at 1241 Dandenong Road, Malvern East, as an exclusive Year 9 campus.
- 2019 – Final Year 4 students.
- 2024 – Final Year 5 students.
- 2025 – Final Year 6 students. The Holy Trinity campus closed. The Kinnoull campus became a middle school for Years 7–9, and the Tiverton campus became a senior school for Years 10–12.

== Campuses ==
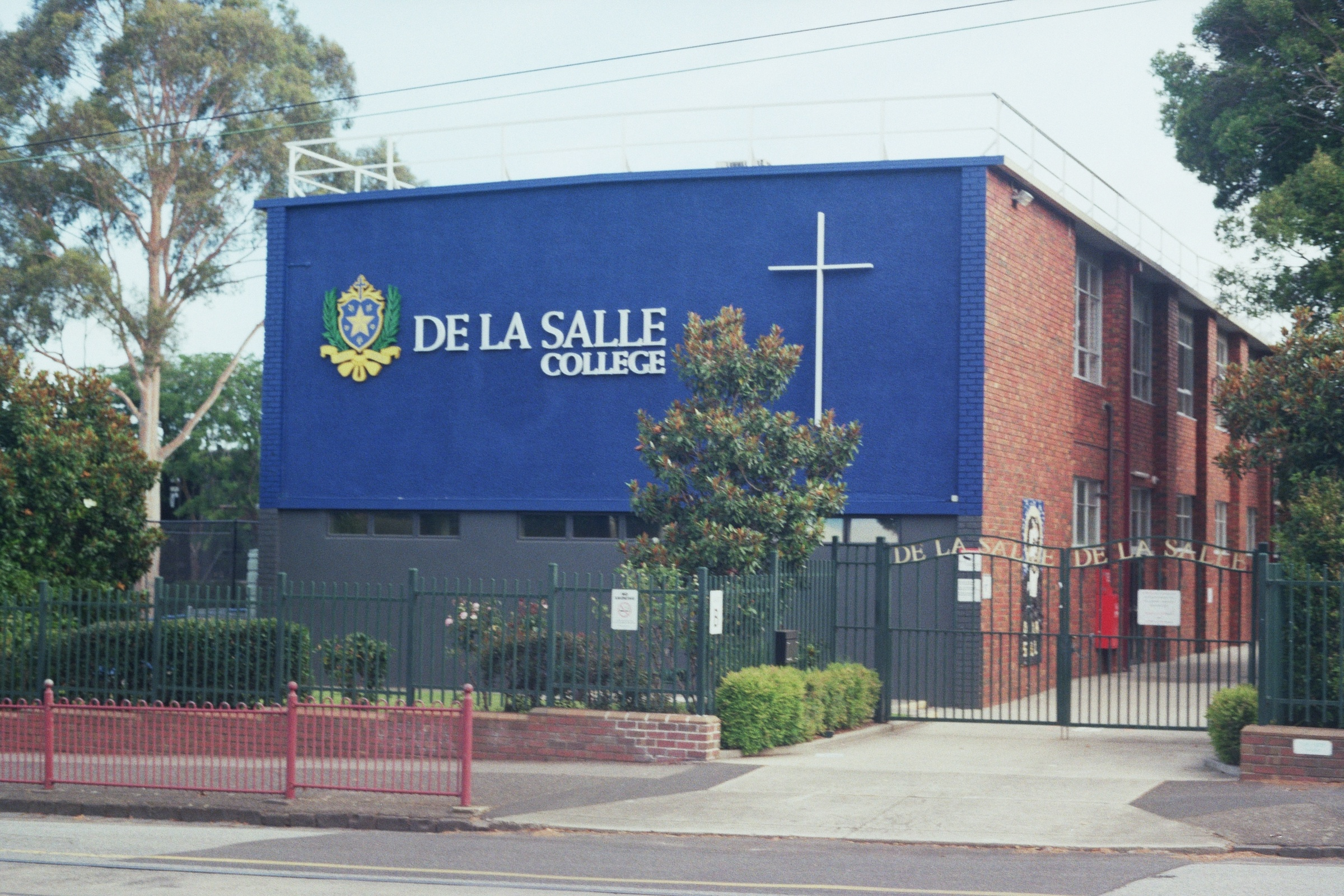
De La Salle Malvern campus

There are two campuses, Tiverton and Kinnoull, all in Malvern. Because of their proximity and for government funding reasons they are considered one campus.

The Kinnoull Campus is adjacent to the Malvern Cricket Ground at the end of Northbrook Avenue and Sorrett Avenue. The site was purchased in 1955, and was initially a junior campus for Grades 3 – Form 2 (Year 8). Facilities include a chapel, Saint Miguel lecture theatre, amphitheatre, library, oval, and a cafeteria style canteen.

Tiverton Campus is located on High Street and is home to Years 10–12 students. Facilities include a Performing Arts Centre, gymnasium, weights room, basketball courts, chapel, library and dedicated arts and technology spaces. The Rheims Centre is an advanced technical and science space opened in 2018.

== Curriculum ==
De La Salle College offers its senior students multiple pathways including the Victorian Certificate of Education (VCE) and VET and VCAL

VCE results 2012-2025
Year	Rank	Median study score	Scores of 40+ (%)	Cohort size
2012	136	31	8.2	217
2013	176	30	7.8	244
2014	186	30	6.4	241
2015	175	30	6.7	216
2016	232	29	5.3	226
2017	178	30	6.4	217
2018	115	32	7.2	207
2019	138	31	7.8	193
2020	165	30	8.5	200
2021	118	31	10.3	218
2022	240	29	5.4	160
2023	132	31	7.5	192
2024	202	30	5	184
2025	98	32	9.6	178

== Sport ==
As a member of the Associated Catholic Colleges, interschool competition is offered to year 7–12 students in:

- Athletics
- Australian Rules Football
- Basketball
- Chess
- Cricket
- Cross country running
- Golf
- Swimming
- Hockey
- Soccer
- Table tennis
- Tennis
- Volleyball

ACC matches are timetabled into the school week. Students are also involved in state and national level competitions in athletics, snow sports and weightlifting.

=== ACC premierships ===
De La Salle has won the following ACC premierships.

- Athletics (26) – 1944, 1945, 1946, 1947, 1963, 1964, 1965, 1967, 1973, 1978, 1979, 1980, 1981, 1982, 1984, 1985, 1993, 1994, 1995, 1996, 1997, 1998, 1999, 2000, 2002, 2016
- Basketball (2) – 1992, 2008
- Cricket (20) – 1932, 1934, 1939, 1945, 1951, 1954, 1956, 1957, 1959, 1973, 1975, 1989, 1990, 1992, 1993, 2010, 2011, 2014, 2016, 2017
- Cross Country (7) – 1993, 1994, 2000, 2001, 2002, 2003, 2004, 2013
- Football (18) – 1935, 1936, 1939, 1941, 1942, 1943, 1944, 1945, 1947, 1958, 1960, 1977, 1987, 1989, 1990, 2002, 2003, 2008
- Golf (5) – 2010, 2011, 2013, 2017, 2019
- Handball (2) – 1942, 1948
- Hockey (2) – 1998, 2019
- Soccer – 1984, 2011
- Swimming (20) – 1942, 1943, 1952, 1953, 1956, 1957, 1958, 1974, 1975, 1976, 1978, 1979, 1980, 1981, 1982, 1983, 1993, 1996, 2018, 2019
- Tennis (13) – 1934, 1935, 1944, 1948, 1949, 1951, 1954, 1985, 1986, 1987, 1988, 1989, 2000

== Mission Action Day ==
On the final day of term 1, students participate in Mission Action Day (formerly Charity Action Day), which consists of a 13 km walk from Kooyong Stadium to T.H. King Oval, Glen Iris and back.

The walk is usually completed in two hours, with students sponsored for completing the walk, thereby raising much needed funds for schools in third-world countries, including the Philippines and Indonesia. This event has raised $30,000 AUD in 2021.

== Yaluwo ==
The De La Salle 'Yaluwo' are a group of recently graduated Year 12 students who travel to Sri Lanka to work on projects that help the Sri Lankan Lasallian community at Diyagala Boys Town. Money raised by the students throughout the year goes towards the completion of the projects.

The De La Salle students work as labourers for approximately four weeks and while they are doing so, live with the De La Salle Brothers and immerse themselves in the community they are helping. This is an alternate way for students to celebrate their year 12 graduation whilst contributing to underprivileged communities. All students must commit to the immersion at the start of their year 12-year and raise a minimum amount per student for the building projects. Students also cover their own transport and living costs.

== Patron saint ==
St. Jean-Baptiste De La Salle was born in Reims, France on 30 April 1651. He was 29 years old when he realised that the educational system of his day was inadequate to meet the needs of poor children. To provide a Christian and human education that would be practical and effective, La Salle founded a religious community of men, the Institute of the Brothers of the Christian Schools (Fratres Scholarum Christianarum), dedicated to the instruction of youth.

After many hardships, Jean-Baptiste De La Salle died on Good Friday, 7 April 1719. He was canonised a saint of the Catholic Church in 1900 and declared "Universal Patron of All Teachers" by Pope Pius XII in 1950. The feast of St. Jean-Baptiste De La Salle is celebrated on 15 May by the worldwide La Sallian movement of approximately 1 million students in over 85 countries.

== Royal Commission into Institutional Responses to Child Sexual Abuse 2013–17 ==
The Royal Commission estimated that 13.8 percent of De La Salle Brothers, Australia wide, were alleged perpetrators of child sexual abuse. De La Salle Malvern are known to have had two brothers actively offending whilst teaching at the college. One, Brother Frank 'Ibar' Terrence Keating, was sentenced in 2018 to five years and three months in jail for indecently assaulting eight students between 1969 and 1977. Historian Edward Duyker, a Fellow of the Australian Academy of the Humanities who gave evidence to the Royal Commission, has drawn attention to the presence of other paedophile Brothers who resided at the college and abused boys next door at St Joseph's Primary School, Malvern, in the 1960s. He has also documented sexual abuse, alleged abuse, or concealment of abuse by other Brothers, as well as child sexual abuse offences committed by former students of De La Salle College, Malvern (including a school captain), who joined the De La Salle Brothers or the priesthood.

== Houses ==
There are four Houses:

- St Mark's (red)
- St Edwin's (green)
- St Leo's (blue)
- St Austin's (yellow)

Years 10–12 are arranged in houses.

== Classroom saints ==
Years 7 and 8 classrooms are named after the following patron saints or significant people in the history of the College.

=== Benilde ===
Peter Romancon (Brother Benildus) was born in Thuret, France, on 14 June 1805. He worked quietly and effectively as a teacher and principal, educating boys – many of whom had never been to school before – in Saugues, an isolated village on a barren plateau in southern France. It was said of him that he was "always cheerful" in the daily routine of school. He died at Saugues on 13 August 1862, and was declared Blessed on 4 April 1942. He was canonised on 29 October 1967, and his feast day is 13 August.

=== Dunstan ===
Brother Dunstan Drumm was born in Ireland on 11 July 1880 in Ardee, County Louth, and arrived in Australia in 1912. He became the first Headmaster of De La Salle College and remained in that position from 1912–1917. He then taught in New South Wales, eventually returning to Ireland in 1922 where he taught in schools there and in England. He died on 24 September 1952 and is buried in Kintbury, UK.

=== Hegarty ===
Father Simon Hegarty CM arrived at St Joseph's Parish Church in Malvern in 1895 and was instrumental in negotiating the appointment of the De La Salle Brothers to Malvern to open a school for boys. His term as Parish Priest ended in 1914 when he volunteered as War Chaplain. He later returned to his homeland, Ireland, where he died on Christmas Eve 1935.

=== Jerome ===
Brother Jerome Foley was born in Ireland on 9 August 1886 and is one of the original three brothers who commenced De La Salle College, Malvern, on 5 February 1912. He is the longest-serving Headmaster of the College from 1929–1946, which was followed by his appointment as Provincial of the De La Salle Brothers from 1929–1958. Brother Jerome died on 9 September 1975, and is buried in the Brothers Cemetery at Oakhill College in Sydney. Behind a somewhat gruff exterior, Brother Jerome concealed a sensitive heart. He had an uncanny knack for bringing badgering or cajoling them. He nurtured a whole group of young men remarkable for their academic achievements and for their loyalty to the church.

=== Roland ===
Nicholas Roland, born in Rheims on 2 December 1642, founded the congregation of the Holy Infant (Child) Jesus. As the spiritual Father of Saint John Baptist De La Salle, he approached him as his executor and begged him to secure the approval of the congregation of the Sister of the Infant Jesus, which he founded for the instruction and salvation of poor and abandoned children. He died on 27 April 1678. His feast day is 27 April.

== Notable alumni ==
=== Arts, academia, entertainment and media ===
- Jason Donovan – Former Neighbours actor and musician who sold more than 3 million albums in the UK
- Peter Drake AO – Emeritus Professor, Foundation Vice Chancellor, Australian Catholic University, Order of Australia
- Edward Duyker OAM – historian, author and fellow of the Australian Academy of the Humanities. Numerous awards include Order of Australia and Ordre des Palmes Académiques.
- Archimede Fusillo – author
- Paul Hogan – butler of US reality show Joe Millionaire
- Jules Lund – presenter on Getaway, in 2010 he joined Fifi Box to host drive nationally on Austereo's Fox FM, a role which saw him win Best Newcomer at the 2011 Australian Commercial Radio Awards.
- Stephen McIntyre – Associate Professor of Music, University of Melbourne, renowned pianist
- Gerald Murnane – fiction writer frequently nominated for Nobel Prize for literature
- Tony Stewart – sound recordist, one of the Balibo Five murdered by the Indonesian military in 1975
- Geoffrey Tozer – classical pianist
- Alphonse Gangitano – Melbourne gangland killings

=== Religion ===
- Eric D'Arcy – late Archbishop of Hobart (1988–1999)
- Anthony Ireland – Archbishop of Hobart (from 2025)

=== Law ===
- Tony Pagone – judge of the Federal Court of Australia; until 21 June 2013 he was a judge of the Supreme Court of Victoria
- Bernard Teague AO – Supreme Court Judge, former president of The Law Institute of Victoria, Victorian Legal Personality of the Year 1985, Officer of the Order of Australia 2008, appointed to head royal commission into Victoria's bushfires in February 2009, and was created an Officer of the Order of Australia in the Australia Day Honours, 2009
- John Harber Phillips AC, QC (18 October 1933 – 7 August 2009) – appointed as Chief Justice of the Supreme Court of Victoria in 1991; barrister, author, and judge. Best known for defending Lindy Chamberlain against the charge of murdering baby Azaria. Later became the first director of public prosecutions of Victoria and director of National Crime Authority
- Greg Barns – barrister
- Bruce Anthony Chamberlain AM (9 August 1939 – 1 October 2005) – 17th President of the Legislative Council of Victorian Parliament and former school captain. Member of the Order of Australia.

=== Politics ===
- James Ingram AO – former Australian diplomat and former executive director of the United Nations World Food Program

=== Business ===
- Michael Luscombe – CEO of Woolworths, Australian retail conglomerate

=== Sport ===
VFL/AFL Players:

- Jack Higgins – Richmond
- Brayden Maynard (2014) – Collingwood
- Fletcher Roberts – Western Bulldogs, premiership player 2016
- Jarryd Lyons (2010) – Adelaide, Gold Coast, Brisbane Lions
- Corey Maynard – Melbourne Football Club
- Daniel Hughes (2004) – Melbourne
- Thomas Murphy (2003) – Hawthorn
- Andrew Carrazzo (2001) – Carlton
- Trent Croad (1997) – Hawthorn, Fremantle Hawks Premiership Player 2008
- Brian Stynes (1990) – Melbourne
- Barry Breen – St Kilda Grand Final Legend, 301 game veteran, Sydney Swans manager of operations
- Pat Cash Sr. – Hawthorn Footballer and father of Wimbledon Winner Pat Cash
- Jamie Duursma – Sydney Swans, Brisbane Bears, Melbourne
- Frank Dimattina – Richmond. Player then team manager and father of Western Bulldogs player Paul Dimattina
- Jack Dyer OAM (15 November 1913 – 23 August 2003) – Richmond Captain/Coach, AFL Hall of Fame Legend 1996, AFL Team of the Century
- Bob Johnson – Melbourne
- Bernie Jones – Hawthorn, Essendon – Hawks 1976 Premiership Player
- Peter Murnane – Hawthorn – 1976, 1978 Premiership Player
- Peter O'Donohue – Hawthorn – Player and Coach
- John Kennedy Sr. – Hawthorn – Hawthorn premiership coach 1961, 1971, 1976. Icon of the game. Team of the Century Coach
- John Kennedy Jr. – Hawthorn – Premiership Player for Hawthorn 1983, 1986, 1988, 1989
- Felix Russo – St Kilda
- Michael Nugent – Richmond
- Terry Waters – Collingwood Captain 1970/1971
- Paul Cooper – Hawthorn
- Roger Ellingworth – Melbourne, Hawthorn
- Kevin Sheedy – Richmond football club. Essendon football coach Premiership coach 1984/85, 1993, 2000, Greater Western Sydney coach 2013

Sport – Other:

- Ashton Agar (2011) – Australian Test Cricketer, made 98 on debut holding a number of world records
- Wes Agar – Cricketer
- Danny Nikolic – Jockey
- Michael Beer (2002) – Australian test cricketer
- Michael Valkanis – Footballer, South Melbourne, AEL, Adelaide United, capped once for Australia
- Brian Stynes – Gaelic Footballer and premiership all-star award winner 1995
- Adrian Kebbe – Weightlifter, Australian Commonwealth Games Silver Medal at the 1978 Commonwealth Games
- Damian Brown – Weightlifter, Australian Olympic weightlifter and flag bearer at the 2002 Commonwealth Games
- Simon Heffernan – Weightlifter, silver medalist at the 2006 Commonwealth Games, twice Australia Day ambassador
- Andrew Collett – Olympic judo player
- Seb Gotch – cricket
- Ben Ayre – basketball
