= 1976 Hawthorn Football Club season =

52nd season in the Victorian Football League

Hawthorn Football Club
1976 season
- President: Phil J. Ryan
- Coach: John Kennedy, Sr.
- Captain: Don Scott
- Home ground: Princes Park
- VFL season: 16–6 (2nd)
- Finals Series: Premiers (Defeated North Melbourne 100–70)
- Best and Fairest: Leigh Matthews
- Leading goalkicker: Michael Moncrieff (97)
- Highest home attendance: 110,143 (Grand Final vs. North Melbourne)
- Lowest home attendance: 7,567 (Round 18 vs. Melbourne)
- Average home attendance: 28,559

The 1976 season was the Hawthorn Football Club's 52nd season in the Victorian Football League and 75th overall. Hawthorn qualified for finals for the third consecutive season. Hawthorn qualified for the Grand Final for the second consecutive season. In the Grand Final, Hawthorn faced North Melbourne for the second consecutive season. Hawthorn won their third VFL premiership defeating North Melbourne 100–70. This was their first premiership since 1971.

== Fixture ==
=== Premiership season ===
Rd	Date and local time	Opponent	Scores (Hawthorn's scores indicated in bold)			Venue	Attendance	Record
Rd	Date and local time	Opponent	Home	Away	Result	Venue	Attendance	Record
1	Saturday, 3 April (2:10 pm)	St Kilda	13.11 (89)	**16.15 (111)**	Won by 22 points	Moorabbin Oval (A)	22,879	1–0
2	Saturday, 10 April (2:10 pm)	North Melbourne	**20.11 (131)**	16.13 (109)	Won by 22 points	Princes Park (H)	15,479	2–0
3	Saturday, 17 April (2:10 pm)	Collingwood	**25.22 (172)**	12.12 (84)	Won by 88 points	Princes Park (H)	23,965	3–0
4	Saturday, 24 April (2:10 pm)	Footscray	**14.20 (104)**	14.8 (92)	Won by 12 points	VFL Park (H)	27,040	4–0
5	Saturday, 1 May (2:10 pm)	Essendon	10.15 (75)	**14.10 (94)**	Won by 19 points	Windy Hill (A)	14,389	5–0
6	Saturday, 8 May (2:10 pm)	Carlton	**7.20 (62)**	15.12 (102)	Lost by 40 points	Princes Park (H)	27,889	5–1
7	Saturday, 15 May (2:10 pm)	Melbourne	14.13 (97)	**21.19 (145)**	Won by 48 points	Melbourne Cricket Ground (A)	25,876	6–1
8	Saturday, 22 May (2:10 pm)	South Melbourne	**20.16 (136)**	11.10 (76)	Won by 60 points	Princes Park (H)	7,827	7–1
9	Saturday, 29 May (2:10 pm)	Fitzroy	**18.15 (123)**	14.12 (96)	Won by 27 points	Princes Park (H)	8,971	8–1
10	Saturday, 5 June (2:10 pm)	Richmond	13.10 (88)	**15.10 (100)**	Won by 20 points	Melbourne Cricket Ground (A)	29,608	9–1
11	Monday, 14 June (2:10 pm)	Geelong	**11.22 (88)**	11.10 (76)	Won by 12 points	Princes Park (H)	33,692	10–1
12	Saturday, 19 June (2:10 pm)	St Kilda	**13.19 (97)**	18.14 (122)	Lost by 25 points	Princes Park (H)	14,294	10–2
13	Saturday, 26 June (2:10 pm)	North Melbourne	9.13 (67)	**10.15 (75)**	Won by 8 points	Arden Street Oval (A)	16,230	11–2
14	Saturday, 3 July (2:10 pm)	Footscray	5.7 (37)	**17.15 (117)**	Won by 80 points	Western Oval (A)	13,307	12–2
15	Saturday, 10 July (2:10 pm)	Collingwood	16.11 (107)	**18.11 (119)**	Won by 12 points	VFL Park (A)	27,353	13–2
16	Saturday, 17 July (2:10 pm)	Essendon	**15.17 (107)**	18.15 (123)	Lost by 16 points	Princes Park (H)	16,579	13–3
17	Saturday, 24 July (2:10 pm)	Carlton	17.14 (116)	**11.19 (85)**	Lost by 31 points	Princes Park (A)	26,378	13–4
18	Saturday, 31 July (2:10 pm)	Melbourne	**16.17 (113)**	14.11 (95)	Won by 18 points	Princes Park (H)	7,567	14–4
19	Saturday, 7 August (2:10 pm)	South Melbourne	12.11 (83)	**13.19 (97)**	Won by 14 points	VFL Park (A)	18,640	15–4
20	Saturday, 14 August (2:10 pm)	Fitzroy	12.19 (91)	**14.10 (94)**	Won by 3 points	Junction Oval (A)	10,417	16–4
21	Saturday, 21 August (2:10 pm)	Richmond	**11.16 (82)**	17.12 (114)	Lost by 32 points	Princes Park (H)	13,674	16–5
22	Saturday, 28 August (2:10 pm)	Geelong	13.18 (96)	**10.11 (71)**	Lost by 25 points	Kardinia Park (A)	22,916	16–6

=== Finals Series ===
Rd	Date and local time	Opponent	Scores (Hawthorn's scores indicated in bold)			Venue	Attendance
Rd	Date and local time	Opponent	Home	Away	Result	Venue	Attendance
Qualifying final	Saturday, 4 September (2:30 pm)	North Melbourne	**14.19 (103)**	12.11 (83)	Won by 20 points	Melbourne Cricket Ground (H)	64,148
Semi-final	Saturday, 11 September (2:30 pm)	Carlton	9.16 (70)	**12.15 (87)**	Won by 17 points	VFL Park (A)	60,105
Grand Final	Saturday, 25 September (2:50 pm)	North Melbourne	**13.22 (100)**	10.10 (70)	Won by 30 points	Melbourne Cricket Ground (H)	110,143

== Ladder ==
(P)	Premiers
	Qualified for finals

#	Team	P	W	L	D	PF	PA	%	Pts
1	Carlton	22	16	5	1	2245	1690	132.8	66
2	Hawthorn (P)	22	16	6	0	2323	2035	114.2	64
3	North Melbourne	22	15	7	0	2041	1748	116.8	60
4	Geelong	22	12	10	0	2251	2166	103.9	48
5	Footscray	22	11	10	1	1958	2023	96.8	46
6	Melbourne	22	11	11	0	2319	2333	99.4	44
7	Richmond	22	10	12	0	2192	2224	98.6	40
8	South Melbourne	22	9	13	0	2223	2364	94.0	36
9	St Kilda	22	9	13	0	2056	2282	90.1	36
10	Essendon	22	9	13	0	1987	2253	88.2	36
11	Fitzroy	22	7	15	0	2005	2161	92.8	28
12	Collingwood	22	6	16	0	2033	2354	86.4	24

Rules for classification: 1. premiership points; 2. percentage; 3. points for
Average score: 97.1
Source: AFL Tables
