= Lurch =

Lurch may refer to:

== Entertainment ==
- Lurch (The Addams Family), fictional butler in the 1960s American television series
- Lurch McDuck, fictional character, Scrooge McDuck's cousin, in the 1968 Disney story
- Lurch (EP), released in 1990 by Steel Pole Bath Tub

== Games ==
- Lurch (cards), in card games like Cribbage when a player or team loses with a particularly low score
- a synonym for Lourche, a lost 17th century French board game, surviving only in the phrase "left in the lurch"

== Nickname ==
- Björn Andersson (handballer) (born 1950), Swedish former handball player
- Gene Brabender (1941-1996), American Major League Baseball pitcher
- Barry Goodingham (born 1945), former Australian rules footballer
- Robert Jackson, musician with the band New Birth
- John O'Neill (rugby league) (1943-1999), Australian rugby league player

== Other uses ==
- Jerk (physics), also known as lurch, the rate of change of acceleration
- Lurch, an Ankole-Watusi steer holding world record for horn circumference

== See also ==
- Big Lurch (born 1976), rapper and convicted murderer and cannibal
