= Terry Moore (Australian footballer) =

Australian rules footballer

Personal information
- Full name: Terry Moore
- Born: 6 August 1951 (age 75); Nuriootpa, South Australia
- Original team: Central District
- Height: 196 cm (6 ft 5 in)
- Weight: 93 kg (205 lb)
- Position: Ruckman

Playing career^{1}
Years	Club	Games (Goals)
1976–77	North Melbourne	40 (16)
1979–80	Hawthorn	21 (10)
Total		61 (26)
- ^{1} Playing statistics correct to the end of 1980.

Terry Moore (born 6 August 1951) is a former Australian rules footballer who played with North Melbourne and Hawthorn in the Victorian Football League (VFL).

Moore, originally from Nuriootpa, started his career in 1968 at South Australian National Football League (SANFL) club Central District and represented South Australia at the 1972 Perth Carnival. After standing out of the game in 1975 while he awaited a clearance, Moore joined North Melbourne in 1976 and was centre half forward in their Grand Final losing team that year. He played one further season at North Melbourne before crossing to Hawthorn.

== Personal life ==
Terry had two sons: Josh, who was a contestant on the ninth season of Big Brother Australia, and Toby, whose death in 2012 prompted Josh to leave the show.
