= Mark Dawson (footballer) =

Australian rules footballer

Personal information
- Born: 22 August 1953 (age 73)
- Original team: St Dominic's
- Height: 177 cm (5 ft 10 in)
- Weight: 70 kg (154 lb)
- Position: Utility

Playing career^{1}
Years	Club	Games (Goals)
1972–78	North Melbourne	59 (58)
1979	Port Adelaide	19 (25)
Total		78 (83)
- ^{1} Playing statistics correct to the end of 1979.

Career highlights
- Port Adelaide premiership player (1979)

Mark Dawson (born 22 August 1953) is a former Australian rules footballer who played with North Melbourne in the Victorian Football League (VFL) during the 1970s.

Dawson was recruited to North Melbourne from St Dominic's and struggled to make regular appearances in the seniors due to the quality within the side. He had his best year in 1976 when he kicked 26 goals and was a rover in the 1976 VFL Grand Final loss to Hawthorn. Despite playing in the winning 1978 Preliminary Final team he was dropped for the Grand Final and never played VFL football again.

After turning down an offer from South Australian National Football League (SANFL) club Woodville Football Club, Dawson was traded by North Melbourne to fellow SANFL club Port Adelaide in 1979 in return for Russell Ebert.
