= Chisnall =

Chisnall is a surname. Notable people with the surname include:

- Dave Chisnall (born 1980), English darts player
- David Chisnall (1948–2013), English rugby league player
- Eric Chisnall (born 1946), English rugby league player
- Peter Chisnall (born 1949), Australian rules footballer
- Phil Chisnall (1942–2021), English footballer
