= Barry Goodingham =

Australian rules footballer

Personal information
- Full name: Barry Goodingham
- Born: 9 May 1945 (age 81)
- Original team: Edithvale-Aspendale
- Height: 199 cm (6 ft 6 in)
- Weight: 99 kg (218 lb)

Playing career^{1}
Years	Club	Games (Goals)
1967–75	North Melbourne	158 (47)
1976–77	South Melbourne	30 (12)
1978–80	Woodville	48 (9)
Total		236 (68)
- ^{1} Playing statistics correct to the end of 1980.

Barry Goodingham (born 9 May 1945) was a regular first ruckman for the North Melbourne Football Club and South Melbourne in the Victorian Football League (VFL) during the late 1960s and early 1970s.

Nicknamed 'Lurch', due to his resemblance to the butler in the television sitcom The Addams Family, he captained North Melbourne in 1971.

Recruited from Edithvale-Aspendale, where he played in their 1965 Morningron Peninsula premiership, he was selected in North Melbourne's first Premiership team in 1975, where he shared the ruck duties with team mate, Mick Nolan. He enjoys a life membership of the North Melbourne Football Club.

Goodingham finished his VFL career with a two-year stint at South Melbourne, traded in a deal that sent Peter Keenan to North Melbourne. He then went to South Australia and played for three years for Woodville, the last two as playing coach.
