= Peter Welsh (footballer, born 1954) =

Australian rules footballer

Personal information
- Full name: Peter James Welsh
- Nickname: Woosha
- Born: 24 January 1954
- Died: 18 July 2008 (aged 54)
- Original team: Yinnar
- Height: 180 cm (5 ft 11 in)
- Weight: 90 kg (198 lb)
- Positions: Back pocket, utility

Playing career^{1}
Years	Club	Games (Goals)
1973–1978	Hawthorn	79 (9)
1980–1984	Richmond	46 (45)
Total		125 (54)
- ^{1} Playing statistics correct to the end of 1984.

Peter James Welsh (24 January 1954 – 18 July 2008) was an Australian rules footballer who played for Hawthorn and Richmond in the Victorian Football League (VFL).

A utility player who was used mainly in the back pocket, Welsh started his VFL career in 1973 with Hawthorn and played in their 1975 Grand Final loss to North Melbourne. He crossed to Richmond in 1980 and was a member of their side which won the premiership that season. Welsh was on occasions pushed forward and kicked 22 goals in 1981.

Welsh died on 18 July 2008 after a long illness. He was the son of Collingwood footballer Bill Welsh.
