= Bill Welsh (footballer, born 1924) =

Australian footballer (1924–2019)

Personal information
- Full name: William Charles Welsh
- Born: 3 August 1924; Trafalgar, Victoria
- Died: 10 December 2019 (aged 95)
- Original team: Yinnar / Morwell
- Height: 178 cm (5 ft 10 in)
- Weight: 86 kg (190 lb)

Playing career^{1}
Years	Club	Games (Goals)
1950	Collingwood	8 (8)
- ^{1} Playing statistics correct to the end of 1950.

William Charles Welsh (3 August 1924 – 10 December 2019) was an Australian rules footballer who played with Collingwood in the Victorian Football League (VFL). He was the father of Hawthorn and Richmond player Peter Welsh.

Originally from Yinnar, Welsh came to Collingwood via Morwell, a club in the Central Gippsland Football League. Welsh, a half forward, played eight league games for Collingwood in the early rounds of the 1950 VFL season.

He got a clearance back to Morwell mid-season and ended the year with a starring role in their grand final win over Warragul. After captain-coaching Morwell in 1951, Welsh was put in charge of Traralgon for the 1952 season. He continued to captain-coach Traralgon in 1953, then didn't reapply for the position the following season, although he did remain as a player.
