= Paul Cooper (Australian footballer) =

Australian rules footballer

Personal information
- Full name: Paul Cooper
- Born: 6 April 1968 (age 58)
- Original team: De La Salle
- Height: 183 cm (6 ft 0 in)
- Weight: 86 kg (190 lb)
- Position: Defender

Playing career^{1}
Years	Club	Games (Goals)
1990–1996	Hawthorn	81 (9)
- ^{1} Playing statistics correct to the end of 1996.

Paul Cooper (born 6 April 1968) is a former Australian rules footballer who played with Hawthorn in the Australian Football League (AFL) during the 1990s.

Cooper played his football in defence, where he was a consistent ball winner. He had a strong debut season in 1990 and got his first taste of September action, with 19 disposals in an elimination final loss to Melbourne at the MCG. The following year he could only manage seven games, all in the second half of the season and missed out on Hawthorn's finals campaign which saw them win their ninth premiership.

From 1993 to 1995, Cooper was a regular fixture in the Hawthorn team, with the aging stars of the 1980s retiring from the game and freeing up spaces in the side. He had his best season in 1993 when he put together 396 disposals, at just under 20 a game.

== Statistics ==
Legend
G	Goals	K	Kicks	D	Disposals	T	Tackles
B	Behinds	H	Handballs	M	Marks

Season	Team	No.	Games	Totals							Averages (per game)							Votes
Season	Team	No.	Games	G	B	K	H	D	M	T	G	B	K	H	D	M	T	Votes
1990	Hawthorn	32	15	1	1	189	58	247	48	13	0.1	0.1	12.6	3.9	16.5	3.2	0.9	0
1991	Hawthorn	26	7	0	1	64	20	84	21	7	0.0	0.1	9.1	2.9	12.0	3.0	1.0	0
1992	Hawthorn	26	6	2	2	62	17	79	19	9	0.3	0.3	10.3	2.8	13.2	3.2	1.5	1
1993	Hawthorn	26	20	3	2	296	100	396	88	31	0.2	0.1	14.8	5.0	19.8	4.4	1.5	0
1994	Hawthorn	26	16	2	4	154	64	218	51	24	0.1	0.2	9.6	4.0	13.6	3.2	1.5	0
1995	Hawthorn	26	15	1	0	181	64	245	57	24	0.1	0.0	12.1	4.3	16.3	3.8	1.6	0
1996	Hawthorn	26	2	0	0	17	11	28	4	3	0.0	0.0	8.5	5.5	14.0	2.0	1.5	0
Career			81	9	10	963	334	1297	288	111	0.1	0.1	11.9	4.1	16.0	3.6	1.4	1
