= Shane Murphy (footballer) =

Australian rules footballer

Personal information
- Full name: Shane Murphy
- Born: 1 December 1955 (age 70)
- Original team: Kew Amateurs
- Height: 183 cm (6 ft 0 in)
- Weight: 82 kg (181 lb)
- Position: Forward

Playing career^{1}
Years	Club	Games (Goals)
1975–1978	Hawthorn	14 (15)
- ^{1} Playing statistics correct to the end of 1978.

Shane Murphy (born 1 December 1955) is a former Australian rules footballer who played with Hawthorn in the Victorian Football League (VFL) during the 1970s.

Murphy, a forward, made his VFL debut against Essendon in the final round of the 1975 VFL season and kicked three goals. He performed well enough in Hawthorn's first final to be selected as a half forward flanker in the grand final.

A former Kew Amateur, he put together four appearances in 1976 but was wasteful in front of goals, kicking 12 behinds for just three goals.

After playing just twice in 1977, Murphy played another finals campaign in 1978 but lost his place in the grand final to Norm Goss. He never played another game for Hawthorn and ended up at De La Salle.
