= Michael Cooke (footballer) =

Australian rules footballer

Personal information
- Full name: Michael Cooke
- Born: 17 December 1953 (age 72)
- Original team: Old Carey
- Height: 189 cm (6 ft 2 in)
- Weight: 85 kg (187 lb)
- Position: Forward

Playing career^{1}
Years	Club	Games (Goals)
1975	Hawthorn	2 (4)
- ^{1} Playing statistics correct to the end of 1975.

Michael Cooke (born 17 December 1953) is a former Australian rules footballer who played with Hawthorn in the Victorian Football League (VFL).

Cooke was the first Hawthorn player to make his league debut in a final. Due to indifferent form, full-forward Michael Moncrieff was moved by coach John Kennedy to defence for the 1975 semi-final against North Melbourne at Waverley Oval and Cooke was called up to fill the full-forward position. An Old Carey player, he had put in some impressive performances at full-forward in the reserves, where he teamed up well with his brother, centre half-forward Robert.

Cooke's four goals in the semi-final helped Hawthorn book a spot in the premiership decider, for which he kept his spot in the side. Cooke struggled in the grand final and was replaced without managing a kick. He never played another senior game and finished his career at Olinda.
