= Bohdan Jaworskyj =

German-born Australian rules footballer

Personal information
- Born: 14 March 1947 (age 79); Bochum, Allied-occupied Germany
- Original team: North Adelaide (SANFL)
- Height: 185 cm (6 ft 1 in)
- Weight: 86 kg (190 lb)

Playing career^{1}
Years	Club	Games (Goals)
1965–1972	North Adelaide	150 (28)
1973–1975	Hawthorn	67 (3)
1976–1978	North Adelaide	58 (19)
Total		275 (50)
- ^{1} Playing statistics correct to the end of 1975.

Bohdan 'Bugs' Jaworskyj (born 14 March 1947 in Germany) is a former Australian rules footballer who played for Hawthorn in the VFL during the 1970s. He also played over 200 games with North Adelaide in the SANFL and is a half back flanker in their official 'Team of the Century'.

German born Jaworskyj, who had a Ukrainian father and Russian mother, emigrated to Australia when he was aged three. He first played for North Adelaide in 1965 and went on to spend eight seasons with the club, including premierships in 1971 and 1972. A half back, he was also a member of the North Adelaide team which won the Championship of Australia in 1972 where they defeated Carlton by one point in the Grand Final at Adelaide Oval.

A four-time South Australian interstate representative, Jaworskyj was easy to spot on the field with his blonde hair and stocky build. In 1973 he joined Hawthorn and soon established his place on the half back flank. He played every game in 1974 and 1975, his last game in their losing 1975 Grand Final side. He finished his career back at North Adelaide where in his final season he brought up his 200-game milestone for the club.
