= Michael Luscombe =

Australian businessman

Michael Gerard Luscombe (22 July 1953 – 27 April 2018) was an Australian businessman. He was the CEO and managing director of Woolworths, the largest retail company in Australia, from 2006 until 2011.

== Early life ==
Luscombe was educated at De La Salle College, Malvern and Monash University. He graduated with a Bachelor of Economics in 1978.

== Professional career ==
Luscombe began working for Woolworths in 1978 as a graduate trainee in the company's store at Mount Buller in Victoria. He progressed through the company gradually, and became Victorian operations manager in 1990. In 1991, he became national manager for banking at the ANZ Bank. In 2004, he was appointed director of supermarkets at Woolworths, and oversaw the company's takeover of more than 150 new stores.

In October 2006, Luscombe was announced as the new CEO of Woolworths. During his time as CEO, Luscombe faced pressure from Australia's consumer watchdog, the Australian Competition & Consumer Commission, over the company's practice of using planning laws to object to the construction of supermarkets by its competitors.

In August 2009, Luscombe announced the launch of Masters Home Improvement, a hardware retailing business to take on Wesfarmers' Bunnings chain. At that time, he stated to the financial press that Masters was expected to be profitable in two to three years. In January 2016, Woolworths announced the cessation of the Masters business after the expenditure of in excess of $2 billion. Financial analysts expect further losses of approximately $1 billion in closing down the business.

On 4 April 2011, Luscombe announced that he would be retiring as CEO of Woolworths in October.

== Death ==
Luscombe died on 27 April 2018 from Creutzfeldt–Jakob disease.
