= John Hendrie (Australian footballer) =

Australian rules footballer (born 1953)

Personal information
- Full name: John Charles Hendrie
- Born: 11 June 1953 (age 73)
- Original teams: Moyhu, Scotch College
- Height: 188 cm (6 ft 2 in)
- Weight: 87 kg (192 lb)

Playing career^{1}
Years	Club	Games (Goals)
1972–1982	Hawthorn	197 (254)
- ^{1} Playing statistics correct to the end of 1982.

Career highlights
- 2× VFL premiership player: 1976, 1978

John Hendrie (born 11 June 1953) is a former Australian rules footballer who played with Hawthorn in the VFL during the 1970s.

"Bomber" Hendrie attended Scotch College, Melbourne from 1968 to 1971 and was a member of the first XVIII for three years, being vice-captain of the premiership winning side in his final year.

A half forward, Hendrie was a good mark and had a sweeping left foot kick. He kicked 2 goals 8 behinds in the 1976 grand final and The Age newspaper journalists voted him best on ground.

Hendrie finished equal third in the 1975 Brownlow Medal and his highest scoring season was 52 goals in 1977. A dual premiership player with Hawthorn in 1976 and 1978, he also represented Victoria in state of origin matches in 1977 and 1978. In round 21 of the 1978 season, he kicked the winning goal against Geelong.

He struggled to get a senior game with Hawthorn in the last two years of his career, playing eight games in 1981 and only one in 1982. He had offers to join Footscray but took the advice of Allan Jeans to finish his VFL career at Hawthorn. After business took him to Sydney, he played with the North Shore Australian Football Club in the Sydney competition.

Hendrie also played 45 first XI games for Hawthorn East Melbourne Cricket Club in the Melbourne District Cricket Association between 1971-72 and 1977-78.

== Honours and achievements ==
Hawthorn

- 2 × VFL premiership player: 1976, 1978
- Minor premiership: 1975

Individual

- Hawthorn life member
