= Michael Nugent (Australian footballer) =

Australian rules footballer

Personal information
- Full name: Michael Nugent
- Born: 20 March 1959 (age 67)
- Original team: De La Salle
- Height: 196 cm (6 ft 5 in)
- Weight: 92 kg (203 lb)

Playing career^{1}
Years	Club	Games (Goals)
1980–81	Richmond	16 (2)
- ^{1} Playing statistics correct to the end of 1981.

Michael Nugent (born 20 March 1959) is a former Australian rules footballer who played with Richmond in the Victorian Football League (VFL).
