= Alan Goad =

Australian rules footballer

Personal information
- Born: 22 September 1954 (age 72)
- Original team: Korumburra
- Height: 179 cm (5 ft 10 in)
- Weight: 80 kg (176 lb)

Playing career^{1}
Years	Club	Games (Goals)
1972–1982	Hawthorn	138 (129)
- ^{1} Playing statistics correct to the end of 1982.

Alan Goad (born 22 September 1954) is a former Australian rules footballer who played with Hawthorn in the VFL.

A rover, Goad was a premiership player in 1976, kicking 2 goals in Hawthorn's grand final win over North Melbourne. He was often battling to keep his spot in the side due to the strength of the Hawks during the 1970s and spent the 1978 season in the reserves, winning the Gardiner Medal.
