= Kelvin Matthews =

Australian rules footballer

Personal information
- Full name: Kelvin Matthews
- Born: 15 December 1953 (age 72)
- Original team: Chelsea
- Height: 179 cm (5 ft 10 in)
- Weight: 94 kg (207 lb)
- Position: Centre

Playing career^{1}
Years	Club	Games (Goals)
1972–1978	Hawthorn	97 (99)
1978–1982	Geelong	58 (70)
Total		155 (169)
- ^{1} Playing statistics correct to the end of 1982.

Career highlights
- 1976 premiership player; 1974 Victorian state team

Kelvin Matthews (born 15 December 1953) is a former Australian rules footballer. He is the brother of Leigh Matthews, whom he played with at Hawthorn. Kelvin was a centreman and was a member of the Hawks' 1976 premiership side.

Slightly smaller than his brother, Kelvin was heavier and skilful enough to represent Victoria in an interstate game in 1974.

In a match against Fitzroy in 1977, Kelvin kicked eight goals and Leigh six.

Kelvin also did Aussie Rules coaching sessions in the Riverina township of Ganmain in the 1970s.
