= Ian Bremner =

Australian rules footballer

Personal information
- Born: 11 April 1947 (age 79)
- Original team: Pearcedale
- Height: 180 cm (5 ft 11 in)
- Weight: 81 kg (179 lb)
- Position: Half back flank

Playing career^{1}
| Years | Club | Games (Goals) |
| 1966 | Collingwood | 1 (0) |
| 1967–1976 | Hawthorn | 158 (6) |
| Total | | 159 (6) |
- ^{1} Playing statistics correct to the end of 1976.

Career highlights
- 2× VFL premiership player: 1971, 1976

Ian Bremner (born 11 April 1947) is a former Australian rules footballer who represented Collingwood and Hawthorn in the Victorian Football League (VFL) during the 1960s and 1970s.

Recruited from Pearcedale, Bremner started his career at Collingwood in 1965 and played consistently in reserves before making his senior debut in the last home and away game of 1966. After playing just one game his was delisted. He was snapped up by Hawthorn who could see his potential. He established himself as a tough half back flanker, his blond hair stould out in crowded packs. A plumber by profession he would park his van at the site of coach John Kennedy training venue and sleep in it to combat the early starts.

He was a premiership player in 1971, losing grand finalist in 1975 and a premiership player again in 1976.

Bremner moved to Tasmania and had a stint coaching North Hobart in the TANFL for the 1977 and 1978 seasons.

== Honours and achievements ==
Hawthorn

- 2× VFL premiership player: 1971, 1976
- 2× Minor premiership: 1971, 1975

Individual

- Hawthorn life member
