= Roger Ellingworth =

Australian rules footballer

Personal information
- Born: 14 December 1962 (age 63)
- Original teams: St Peters, East Bentleigh
- Debut: 1981
- Height: 184 cm (6 ft 0 in)
- Weight: 72 kg (159 lb)

Playing career^{1}
Years	Club	Games (Goals)
(1981–1984)	Melbourne	41 (20)
(1986)	Hawthorn	1 (0)
- ^{1} Playing statistics correct to the end of 1986.

Roger Ellingworth (born 14 December 1962) is a former Australian rules footballer who played in the Victorian Football League during the 1980s. He played 41 games for Melbourne between 1981 and 1984 and a single game for Hawthorn in 1986. He was recruited from St Peters Junior Football Club in East Bentleigh, Victoria.
