= Gary Cowton =

Australian rules footballer

Personal information
- Born: 30 December 1952 (age 73); Geelong, Victoria
- Original team: Benalla (O&MFL)
- Debut: 1971, North Melbourne vs. Collingwood, at Victoria Park
- Height: 188 cm (6 ft 2 in)
- Weight: 93 kg (205 lb)

Playing career^{1}
Years	Club	Games (Goals)
1971–1978	North Melbourne	129 (34)
1979–1980	Footscray	40 (4)
1981	South Melbourne	8 (0)
1983–1984	North Melbourne	22 (1)
Total		199 (39)
- ^{1} Playing statistics correct to the end of 1984.

Career highlights
- North Melbourne premiership player 1975, 1977

Gary Cowton (born 30 December 1952) is a former Australian rules footballer who played for North Melbourne in the Victorian Football League (VFL) as well as having stints with Footscray and South Melbourne.

Cowton, often known as "Crazy Horse", was a utility player and was a key member of the successful North Melbourne side of the 1970s. He played in five successive grand finals, winning two of them. The first, in 1975 was as a reserve, in 1977 he played on the half back flank in their drawn game and premiership win.

After his football career, Gary completed his Bachelor of Business Degree, majoring in Macro Economics at La Trobe University Bendigo. His career in the Australian Public Service began in 1998 with the Aboriginal and Torres Strait Islander Commission (ATSIC) (1990–2005). He served in West Kimberley at Derby, WA and the East Kimberley at Kununurra, WA and then Cairns, QLD which included Cape York.

Whilst in Cairns, Gary was sponsored by AFL PNG and traveled to Papua New Guinea for some AFL clinics.

Cowton stood as a Senate Candidate for the Australian Capital Territory in the 2019 Federal Election.

Cowton, after postgraduate studies, lectured Economics in China Universities from 2012-2019. Cowton also conducted post-graduate lectures and IELTS courses.
