= Mick Nolan (Australian footballer) =

Australian rules footballer (1949–2008)

Personal information
- Full name: Michael Francis Nolan
- Born: 9 November 1949
- Died: 27 May 2008 (aged 58)
- Original teams: Tarrawingee O&KFL, Wangaratta Rovers (O&MFL)
- Height: 194 cm (6 ft 4 in)
- Weight: 140 kg (309 lb)

Playing career^{1}
Years	Club	Games (Goals)
1973–1980	North Melbourne	107 (40)
- ^{1} Playing statistics correct to the end of 1980.

Career highlights
- 1967 best & fairest, Tarrawingee: 1971, 1972 best & fairest, Wangaratta Rovers, 1971, 1972 Wangaratta Rovers (OMFL) Premierships; VFL Premiership player: (1975); 1982 Mayne Tigers QAFL Premiership captain/coach; 2006 - O&KFNL - Hall of Fame; 2009 - Wangaratta Rovers Hall of Fame; Queensland AFL - Hall of Fame; 2024 - O&MFNL Hall of Fame

Michael Francis Nolan (9 November 1949 – 27 May 2008) was an Australian rules footballer who played for the North Melbourne Football Club in the Victorian Football League (VFL). Because of his weight of 135 kg and height of 194 cm, Nolan was dubbed "The Galloping Gasometer" by commentator Lou Richards. Until the emergence of Aaron Sandilands (only 120 kg) in the early 2000s, Nolan was the heaviest ruckman to play VFL/AFL football. He was nevertheless surprisingly agile and regarded as one of the best "palm" ruckmen of the 1970s. Nolan had a long kick and was unusually effective, for a big man, in picking up the ball at ground level.

As a child in Tarrawingee, Victoria, Nolan supported St Kilda and had the ambition of playing in their first ever premiership. He was recruited by North Melbourne from Wangaratta Rovers and made his senior debut in 1973.

North Melbourne rover Barry Cable said that Nolan was the best tap ruckman he had played with, because of his ability to palm the ball directly into Cable's hands. Nolan's efforts were rewarded with a place in the Kangaroos' team for the 1975 VFL Grand Final, a game in which he dominated the ruck, playing a crucial part in North's first premiership. Nolan finished third that year in voting for the Kangaroos' best and fairest, the Syd Barker Medal. This in itself was remarkable, given that nine members of the 1975 Kangaroos team were later included in the Australian Football Hall of Fame.

In a famous incident, during a game against Carlton at Arden Street, Carlton player Mark Maclure while running for the ball, decided to run into Nolan, who stood his ground and looked likely to be knocked over. However, Maclure bounced off Nolan and fell to the ground, while Nolan casually went about the game as if nothing had happened.

Despite playing 19 games in 1977, Nolan did not play in the 1977 VFL Grand Final, after being replaced in the ruck by Peter Keenan in the semi-final. He played in the reserves the following week, injuring his shoulder and ruling him out of making the senior grand final team.

After Nolan finished his career with North Melbourne in 1980, he was recruited by then VFL president Allen Aylett, to move to Queensland, to develop Australian rules in that rugby-dominated state. Nolan coached the Mayne Tigers in the QAFL from 1981 to 1986, winning a flag in 1982. Nolan also served as captain and coach of the Queensland state team.

Nolan died on 27 May 2008 from cancer and was buried at Pinnaroo Cemetery in Brisbane.
