= Peter Chisnall =

Australian rules footballer

Personal information
- Full name: Peter Chisnall
- Born: 22 January 1949 (age 77)
- Original team: Corowa
- Height: 175 cm (5 ft 9 in)
- Weight: 78 kg (172 lb)

Playing career^{1}
Years	Club	Games (Goals)
1968–1976	North Melbourne	80 (14)
- ^{1} Playing statistics correct to the end of 1976.

Career highlights
- VFL premiership player: 1975

Peter Chisnall (born 22 January 1949) is a former Australian rules footballer for North Melbourne Football Club.

Chisnall, from Corowa originally, played for the North Melbourne Football Club from 1968 to 1970, during the struggling years for the club. After a dispute with North Melb he left North and played 22 games for VFA club Sandringham 1971 - 72. However, he came back in 1974 and played an important role as a wingman. In the 1975 Grand Final he accumulated 16 kicks, 2 marks and 6 handballs: a total of 24 possessions.

As a loyal North Melbourne player during his career, he was one of North Melbourne Football Club supporters favorite players, who played a total of 80 games for the club, both during the struggling years and the successful years.

During his football career at North Melbourne Football Club, he balanced his football career with his occupation as a butcher.

Chisnall also had three stints as a coach in the Tasmanian Football League, firstly as playing coach of New Norfolk in 1977 and 1978 and was later wooed back in 1990 as non-playing coach to the then struggling New Norfolk club (which had been on the brink of bankruptcy only twelve months earlier and had been on the bottom of the ladder for some years). In 1986, between his engagements at New Norfolk, Chisnall coached Port Melbourne in the Victorian Football Association.

Chisnall's appointment generated great optimism and feeling within the Derwent Valley community and attendances rose sharply as his Eagles team rose to great heights and were, at one stage, ladder leaders before falling away late in the season to be comprehensively defeated by Sandy Bay by 89-points in the 1990 TFL Elimination Final.

Chisnall's teams however could not match the same level of intensity as what they'd showed early on in his stint and after two disappointing seasons in 1991 and 1992 in which New Norfolk missed the finals, an increasingly erratic and frustrated Chisnall (who had gotten so riled up in one match against Clarence at Boyer Oval that he was seen to jump the fence into the main grandstand and engage in physical altercation with a Clarence reserves player) resigned from his post at season's end.

After applying for, but being overlooked for the vacant Hobart senior coaching position vacated by Mark Browning, he was to spend the 1993 season as a boundary-rider on ABC-Television's TFL Statewide League broadcasts, Chisnall signed on as senior coach of Launceston Football Club for their TFL Statewide League debut season in 1994.

It was not to be a happy stint for Chisnall as Launceston were woefully out of their depth at statewide league level and the club won just two matches (one as a result of an opposition team playing an unregistered player and losing the points) from thirty-six matches until the end of the 1995 season when Chisnall stood down.

Chisnall has since had no further involvement in Tasmanian football and was last known to be living in country Victoria and running a hotel.
