= Bernie Jones =

Australian rules footballer

Personal information
- Full name: Bernard Matthew Jones
- Born: 3 May 1953
- Died: 20 June 2022 (aged 69)
- Original team: De La Salle
- Height: 197 cm (6 ft 6 in)
- Weight: 92 kg (203 lb)

Playing career^{1}
Years	Club	Games (Goals)
1973–1977	Hawthorn	65 (31)
1978	Essendon	13 (11)
1979–1980	Hawthorn	8 (1)
Total		86 (43)
- ^{1} Playing statistics correct to the end of 1980.

Bernie Jones (3 May 1953 – 20 June 2022) was an Australian rules footballer who played for Hawthorn and Essendon in the VFL during the 1970s.

A ruckman, Jones played in two Grand Finals in his first stint with Hawthorn, the first in 1975 which they lost and the other the following season which they won. In 1978 he crossed to Essendon for the season before returning to Hawthorn where he played until his retirement in 1980.

Jones's son, Dylan, played for the Sandringham Football Club in the Victorian Football League in 2010.
