= Leigh Matthews =

Australian rules footballer (born 1952)

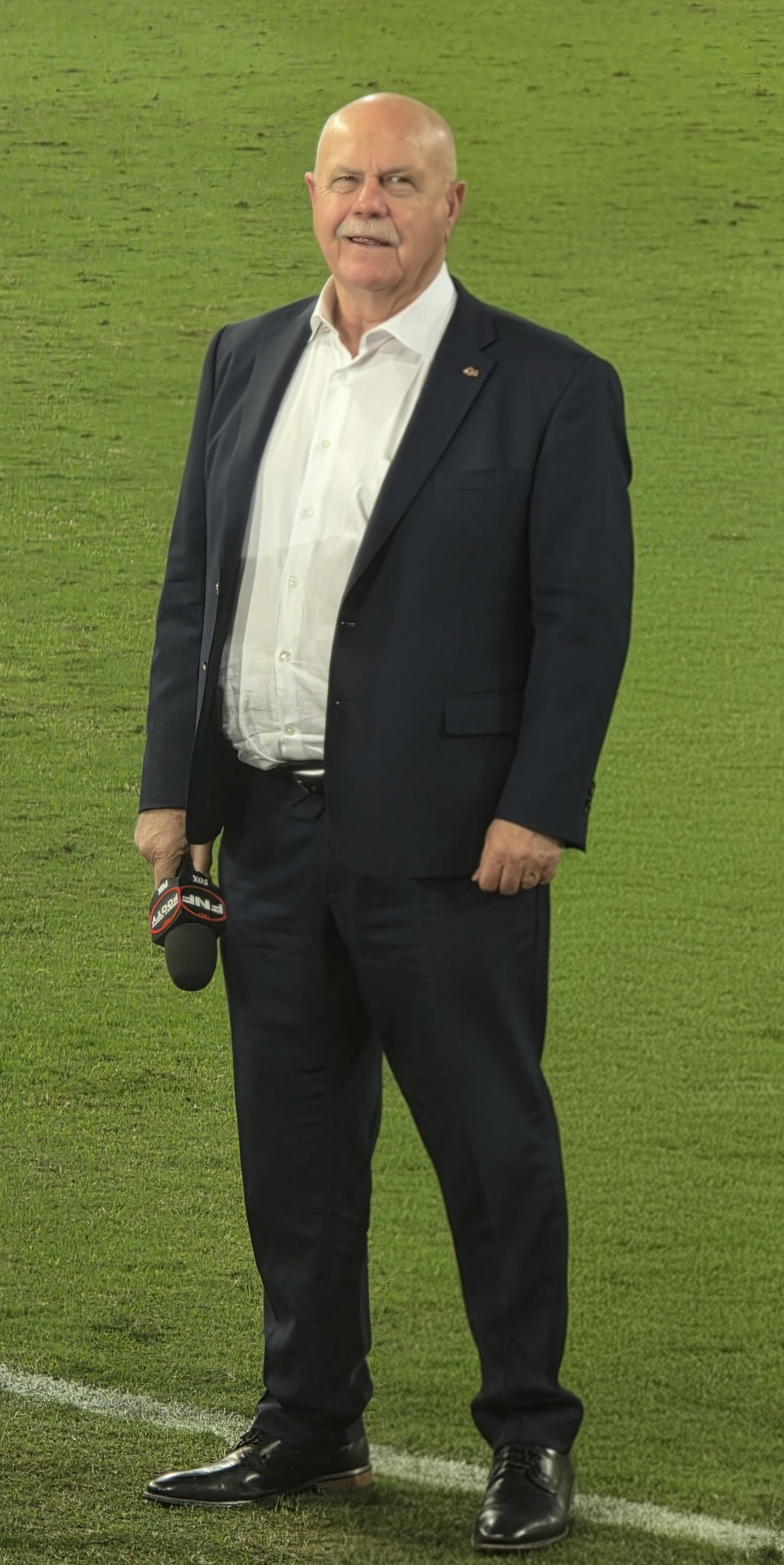
- Matthews working for Fox Footy in 2025

Personal information
- Full name: Leigh Raymond Matthews
- Nicknames: Lethal, Barney Rubble
- Born: 1 March 1952 (age 74); Frankston, Victoria, Australia
- Original team: Chelsea (MPNFL)
- Height: 178 cm (5 ft 10 in)
- Weight: 86 kg (190 lb)
- Position: Midfielder/Forward

Playing career^{1}
Years	Club	Games (Goals)
1969–1985	Hawthorn	332 (915)

Representative team honours
Years	Team	Games (Goals)
1971–1982	Victoria	14 (29)

Coaching career^{3}
Years	Club	Games (W–L–D)
1986–1995	Collingwood	224 (125–94–5)
1999–2008	Brisbane Lions	237 (142–92–3)
1997–1998	Representative; Victoria	2 (2–0–0)
1998	Australia	2 (1–1–0)
Total		465 (270–187–8)
- ^{1} Playing statistics correct to the end of 1985.^{3} Coaching statistics correct as of 2008.

Career highlights
- Playing: 4× VFL premiership player: 1971, 1976, 1978, 1983; VFL premiership captain: 1983; 8× Peter Crimmins Perpetual Memorial Trophy: 1971, 1972, 1974, 1976–1978, 1980, 1982; VFLPA MVP Award (Leigh Matthews Trophy): 1982; Award renamed in 2002 in Matthews honour; Coleman Medal: 1975; All-Australian team: 1972; 2× VFL Team of the Year: 1982, 1983; 6× Hawthorn leading goalkicker: 1973, 1975, 1981–1984; Hawthorn captain: 1981–1985; AFL Team of the Century; Hawthorn Team of the Century; Championship of Australia Championship: 1971; NFL Night Series championship: 1976; AFC Night Series premiership: 1977; VFL Night Series premiership: 1969; 2× Australian National Football Carnival Championship: 1972, 1975; Captain of Victoria; Coaching: 4× AFL premiership coach: 1990, 2001–2003; 3× All-Australian team: 2001–2003; AFL team of the year: 1990; AFLCA Coaching Legend Award: 2013; Hall of Fame: Australian Football Hall of Fame – Legend status; Sport Australia Hall of Fame - Legend Status; Hawthorn Hall of Fame – Legend status; Collingwood Hall of Fame; Brisbane Lions Hall of Fame

Leigh Raymond Matthews (born 1 March 1952) is a former Australian rules football player and coach. He played for Hawthorn in the Victorian Football League (VFL) and coached Collingwood and the Brisbane Lions in the VFL and the renamed Australian Football League (AFL).

As a player, Matthews won four VFL premierships with Hawthorn in 1971, 1976, 1978 and 1983. As a coach, he won four AFL premierships, one with Collingwood in 1990 and a three-peat with Brisbane between 2001 and 2003.

Squat, short-legged and barrel-chested, Matthews earned the iconic nickname "Lethal Leigh" due to his physical as well as skillful style of play. He is officially recognized as the "best player of the 20th century" according to the AFL, is a 'Legend' in the Australian Football Hall of Fame, named in the Hawthorn and AFL teams of the century, and is one of the most successful AFL coaches of all time. Following his coaching career, Matthews has had multiple media roles, most notably as an AFL commentator on television with the Seven Network, and on radio with 3AW.

== Early life ==
Matthews played his junior football at the Chelsea Football Club. He was part of a footballing family: Matthews' brother Kelvin played 155 games at Hawthorn and Geelong. Matthews was married and had his first child at 18.

== Playing career ==
=== 1960s ===
Matthews joined Hawthorn in January 1969, aged sixteen and having already played senior suburban football. He made his senior debut for the Hawks in Round 16 of the 1969 season against Melbourne as a forward pocket, crumbing around the feet of Hawthorn's champion full forward, Peter Hudson. Matthews kicked a goal with his first kick and went on to kick at least one goal in each of his five games that year, winning the club's Best First Year Player award. By midway through 1970, Matthews had earned a regular place in the team as a rover rotating forward. He was immediately impressive, kicking 20 goals from 16 games for the season.

=== 1970s ===
Though still a teenager, Matthews became one of the most important players in a dominant Hawthorn team in 1971. He developed an uncanny ability to win contests, especially near the goals. He kicked 43 goals at an average of 1.9 in 1971 and earned his first of fourteen Victorian guernseys, his first of eight Hawthorn best and fairest awards, and his first of four playing premiership medallions.

On 17 July 1971, Matthews notoriously felled one of the game's fairest and best rovers, Barry Cable, with an elbow to the head. This was the first in a series of occasional violent lapses that punctuated, and ultimately soiled, Matthews' stellar career, culminating in his conviction for criminal assault arising out of an on-field incident in 1985.

In Round 2 of 1972, Matthews destroyed North Melbourne for the first of what would end up being many times during his playing career. He kicked 8 goals in the absence of Hudson (who suffered a season-ending knee injury the previous week). Matthews kicked another six goals against South Melbourne in Round 18 and finished the season with 45 goals at 2.1 per game; additionally, he won his second club best and fairest—all this before his 21st birthday.

Matthews made his presence felt early again in 1973 with an amazing 11-goal haul against Essendon in Round 3, also amassing 42 possessions in the same game. The rest of his season was comparatively quiet; however, his total of 51 goals from 19 games was an impressive figure given the increased time he spent in the midfield. By 1974, Matthews had become one of the toughest and most damaging players in the game. Strong, quick and almost impossible to tackle, Matthews regularly turned matches with brilliant solo efforts. Against Collingwood in a semi-final, Matthews proved the difference with 7 goals from 24 disposals. He went on to win his third best and fairest, averaging 21.8 disposals and kicking 52 goals for the season.

After six seasons in the VFL, Matthews established himself as a superstar of the competition in 1975, winning the Coleman Medal as the League's leading goal kicker, with 67 goals (68 including finals), while averaging 22.9 disposals per game. While 67 goals was an unusually low tally, it was a rare result for a non-full forward to lead the competition. He started the season brilliantly with 47 goals in the first 12 games, including five bags of 5 or more. His 6 goals from 28 kicks in Round 9 against Footscray was a highlight. He was unable to maintain this pace in the second half of the season and could manage only 21 goals in his last 11 appearances. Hawthorn made the grand final; however, they fell to North Melbourne, with Matthews going goalless on the day.

Another brilliant season in 1976 confirmed Matthews as one of the best players in the game. He kicked more goals than most full-forwards, while also being one of the most effective ball-winners in the game. For the season, Matthews kicked 71 goals at 3.2 per game and averaged 22.5 disposals, winning his fourth best and fairest. His best game for the year came in a qualifying final against North Melbourne, when he had 31 kicks and kicked 7 goals from 13 scoring shots. It was an immense performance in a hard-fought win. Hawthorn again played North in the grand final, and although Matthews was not amongst the best this time, his second premiership medal was just reward for a brilliant season.

In the 1977 season, Matthews went from being from one of the best players in the league to one of the best of all time, with what was among the greatest individual seasons by any player in history. Matthews posted career highs in kicks, marks, handballs and goals, averaging 27.1 disposals per game and kicking 91 goals at 3.8 per game. In Round 5 he kicked 6 goals and shared a tally of 14 goals with his brother Kelvin Mathews (8 goals) against Fitzroy. He had 41 disposals in Round 10 against Melbourne, but the peak of Matthews' form came during the last eight games of the home-and-away season, during which he averaged 29.8 disposals and 5.1 goals. He kicked 7 goals and had 30-plus disposals three times in seven weeks and finished the season with another 30 disposals and 6 goals against Essendon in Round 22. He won Hawthorn's best and fairest for the fifth time. Matthews' 91 goals that year was a record for goals kicked by a non-full-forward until it was broken in 1990 by Collingwood's Peter Daicos (whom Matthews was then coaching).

Matthews' performances in 1978 further confirmed his status as the game's number-one player, as he added another 71 goals to his career tally and averaged 25.5 disposals and a career-high 6.4 marks in a year that saw him win his sixth best and fairest and his third premiership medallion. The Hawks again played North Melbourne in the 1978 VFL Grand Final, but this time a best-afield display of 28 disposals and 4 goals by Matthews ensured the win for Hawthorn.

Matthews was on track for another stellar season in 1979 before injury forced him out of all but two of the last 10 games of the year. A 7-goal performance against Richmond in Round 5 was a highlight in a season that saw him spend less time in front of goals and more in the midfield.

=== 1980s ===
In 1980, Matthews became the captain of Hawthorn, a position he held until his retirement in 1985. He was also selected as captain of the Victorian State of Origin team for the only time in his career, and he won his seventh club best and fairest. This year, Matthews spent less time in the forward line, and while it was the first time since 1971 that he averaged fewer than two goals per game, his 26.9 disposals per game was the second-highest in the league.

Hawthorn opened the 1981 season against Melbourne in Round 1 and Matthews, under a slight injury cloud, lined up at full-forward to great effect. In a dominating performance, he took 10 marks and kicked 11 goals. Matthews missed five games between Rounds 3 and 8 before returning to his customary role, alternating between the forward line and midfield for the rest of the season. He maintained impressive form for most of the year, averaging 23.5 disposals and 3 goals in his 16 games. Matthews finished the season as Hawthorn's leading goal kicker and would continue this feat for the next four consecutive years.

After three seasons interrupted by injury and inconsistent form, Matthews returned to his best in 1982, winning the inaugural Players' Association Most Valuable Player award (which was later renamed, in Matthews' honour, to the Leigh Matthews Trophy). He kicked 7 goals in Round 16 against North Melbourne and two weeks later against Collingwood kicked 8 more and had 25 disposals. Matthews averaged 22.5 disposals and 3.4 goals per game for the year and won his eighth Hawthorn best and fairest award.

Matthews earned the nickname "Lethal" for his reputation for giving (and taking) very hard bumps, and in 1982 this reputation was enhanced to the point of legend when he famously collided with a behind post at Windy Hill and broke it. A piece of the post (measuring about one metre) broke off, hitting the boundary umpire, after Matthews ran into its base. It is believed that, to comply with a VFL directive, groundsmen at Windy Hill had glued an extension to the top of the post which broke loose after Matthews collided with it. At the time, commentator Lou Richards called him a "He-Man" due to his large size and strength.

Going into his fifteenth season in the VFL, Matthews showed no signs of slowing down in 1983. He averaged 22.3 disposals and 2.9 goals in his first twelve games before, in Round 15, he made the move to full-forward and remained there for the rest of the season. He went on to kick at least three goals in each of the last 10 games of the year, including the grand final, in which he kicked 6 goals and 5 behinds in his fourth premiership win. For the season, he averaged 20.1 disposals and 3.6 goals per game.

The two best Hawthorn players I've ever coached? There are two, and I wouldn't separate them. They were Graham Arthur and Leigh Matthews.

— John Kennedy Sr.

=== Retirement ===
The 1985 season was Matthews' last as a player. During a wild game versus Geelong which was marred by numerous brawls and reports, Matthews struck his opponent Neville Bruns in an off-the-ball incident, breaking Bruns' jaw. Geelong's Steve Hocking exacted swift retribution, breaking Matthews' nose, and an all-in melee ensued. No report was laid by umpires against Matthews. However, the 'behind play' incident had been captured on camera. After much public outcry, the VFL launched an investigation and subsequently deregistered Matthews for four weeks. He was also charged with assault and fined $1,000. His conviction was later overturned on appeal. The charge remains the only time a top-level player has been charged for an on-field incident.

Matthews' 332nd and final game was the 1985 grand final loss to Essendon.

Upon retirement, Matthews had scored 915 goals, which remains the highest VFL/AFL tally by a non-full-forward. At the time of his retirement, it was the fourth-highest tally by any player; he is now ninth in the all-time list. Matthews also accrued 202 Brownlow Medal votes in his career, currently the tenth-most of all time. His tally is the third most by a player who has not won the award, behind Scott Pendlebury and Joel Selwood.

== Coaching career ==
=== Collingwood ===
Following his retirement, Matthews turned to coaching, becoming assistant coach at the Collingwood Football Club before taking over the head coaching role as senior coach from Bob Rose after three rounds in 1986. Matthews guided Collingwood to finish sixth at the end of the 1986 season, just missing out on the finals with twelve wins and ten losses. In the 1987 season, Collingwood under Matthews did not fare much better, where they finished twelfth at the end of the season with seven wins and fifteen losses.

In the 1988 season, Matthews guided Collingwood to finish second on the ladder, but they were eliminated by Melbourne in the semi-final. The following year, Matthews guided Collingwood to finish fifth on the ladder, but they were again knocked out by Melbourne, this time in the elimination final. In the 1990 grand final, the first under the new AFL banner, Collingwood defeated Essendon, ending its 32-year premiership drought generally referred to as "the Colliwobbles".

In the 1991 season, Collingwood under Matthews just missed out on the finals, where they finished seventh on the ladder. The next season, Matthews guided Collingwood to finish third on the ladder, but they were eliminated by St Kilda in the elimination final. In 1993, Collingwood under Matthews just missed out on the finals, where they finished eighth on the ladder. Matthews returned Collingwood to the finals in 1994 after they finished eighth on the ladder, but were eliminated by the eventual premiers West Coast in the qualifying final.

Matthews was sacked as Collingwood senior coach at the end of the 1995 season, following an unsuccessful year where Collingwood finished tenth on the ladder, thereby missing out on the finals. After the sacking, Matthews stated, “I can see where they're coming from, so there's animosity. Sometimes you just need a change and sometimes the easiest position to change is the coaching position”. Matthews was replaced by Collingwood premiership captain Tony Shaw as Collingwood senior coach. Matthews coached a total of 224 games in ten seasons with 125 wins, 94 losses and 5 draws for a winning percentage of fifty-five percent with the Magpies. Under Matthews' guidance, Collingwood won one premiership in 1990, Matthews' fifth premiership medallion, and for which he would later be retrospectively awarded one of his four Jock McHale Medals.

Matthews supported the planned merger between Hawthorn and Melbourne in 1996.

=== Brisbane Lions ===
After three years, Matthews was coaxed out of retirement by the struggling Brisbane Lions, who had finished sixteenth, the last on the ladder for the 1998 wooden spoon. Matthews became the senior coach of Brisbane Lions for the 1999 season, when he replaced caretaker senior coach Roger Merrett, who replaced John Northey after Northey was sacked in the middle of the 1998 season. Matthews' impact at the Lions was immediate, lifting the team from bottom to third on the ladder in 1999 and making the finals, but they were eliminated by eventual premiers the Kangaroos in the preliminary final. The Lions made the finals again in 2000, before being eliminated by Carlton in the semi-final by 82 points.

In 2001, Matthews famously used the Predator quote, "if it bleeds, we can kill it", to inspire his team for its Round 10 game against Essendon, who sat atop the ladder, was the defending premier, and had lost only two of its previous 34 games. Brisbane finished as 28-point victors. Throughout the remainder of the season, the Lions were undefeated, eventually meeting and once again defeating Essendon in the 2001 grand final for their sixteenth consecutive win, and their first AFL premiership in club history. This would be the first of three consecutive premierships for the Lions under Matthews, defeating Collingwood in both the 2002 grand final and the 2003 grand final. These wins gave Matthews a total of eight premiership medallions as a player or coach. His tenure crested at this point. A bid for a fourth consecutive premiership was brought undone by Port Adelaide in the 2004 grand final, when the Lions lost by 40 points.

In the 2005 season, the Lions finished eleventh on the ladder with ten wins and twelve losses, missing the finals for the first time under Matthews. During the year, after his mother died, Matthews took a leave of absence for one game, which was coached by assistant coach John Blakey. Blakey filled in as caretaker coach in the absence of Matthews for the Round 18 game against the Western Bulldogs, which the Lions lost. In the 2006 season, the Lions did not fare much better, when their form dropped further as they finished thirteenth (third-last) on the ladder with seven wins and fifteen losses. In the 2007 season, the Lions under Matthews finished tenth on the ladder with nine wins, two draws and eleven losses. That year, Matthews coached his 200th game with the club, making him the first person to play or coach 200 games with three clubs. In the 2008 season, the Lions finished tenth on the ladder again for the second straight year in a row, this time with ten wins and twelve losses.

Matthews resigned from his position as Brisbane Lions senior coach on 1 September 2008, at the end of the 2008 season, stating that he "felt the time was right". Matthews was then replaced by Michael Voss as Brisbane Lions senior coach.

Matthews coached Brisbane Lions to a total of 237 games with 142 wins, 92 losses and 3 draws with a winning percentage of 60 percent. Matthews' coaching style at the Lions was reportedly incredibly strict, although obviously successful. Despite his four premierships as a coach, Matthews never coached a team to the minor premiership—though he did finish second with Collingwood twice and second with Brisbane three times.

== Post-coaching career ==
In 2013, Matthews was appointed as Football Director on the Brisbane Lions Board, remaining in the role until stepping down in 2017 due to his commitments in the media industry. Since 2017, he has continued to serve as a member of the Brisbane Lions Board. Matthews was selected to present the premiership cup to the Lions after their victory in the 2024 AFL Grand Final, their first premiership since Matthews' three-peat.

The Brisbane Lions have won 3 x AFL Premierships since Matthews became a Brisbane Lions director - 2024, 2025, 2026.

== Statistics ==
=== Playing statistics ===
Legend
G	Goals	K	Kicks	D	Disposals
B	Behinds	H	Handballs	M	Marks
#	Played in that season's premiership team	†	Led the league for the season

VFL playing statistics
Season	Team	No.	Games	Totals						Averages (per game)						Votes
Season	Team	No.	Games	G	B	K	H	D	M	G	B	K	H	D	M	Votes
1969	Hawthorn	32	5	7	4	60	15	75	6	1.4	0.8	12.0	3.0	15.0	1.2	2
1970	Hawthorn	32	16	20	27	249	48	297	53	1.3	1.7	15.6	3.0	18.6	3.3	3
1971^{#}	Hawthorn	32	23	43	47	443	84	527	111	1.9	2.0	19.3	3.7	22.9	4.8	10
1972	Hawthorn	3	21	45	50	432	49	481	107	2.1	2.4	20.6	2.3	22.9	5.1	16
1973	Hawthorn	3	19	51	48^{†}	426	47	473	81	2.7	2.5	22.4	2.5	24.9	4.3	23
1974	Hawthorn	3	21	52	52	394	53	447	72	2.5	2.5	18.8	2.5	21.3	3.4	15
1975	Hawthorn	3	23	68^{†}	48	452	50	502	73	3.0	2.2	20.5	2.3	22.8	3.3	10
1976^{#}	Hawthorn	3	22	71	42	416	79	495	67	3.2	1.9	18.9	3.6	22.5	3.0	23
1977	Hawthorn	3	24	91	57^{†}	514	144	658	133	3.8	2.6^{†}	21.4	6.0	27.4	5.5	34
1978^{#}	Hawthorn	3	23	71	58	463	123	586	147	3.1	2.5	20.1	5.3	25.5	6.4	3
1979	Hawthorn	3	13	30	25	237	100	337	55	2.3	1.9	18.2	7.7	25.9	4.2	6
1980	Hawthorn	3	17	32	34	364	93	457	78	1.9	2.0	21.4^{†}	5.5	26.9	4.6	16
1981	Hawthorn	3	16	48	36	292	84	376	98	3.0	2.3	18.3	5.3	23.5	6.1	11
1982	Hawthorn	3	22	74	55	383	111	494	109	3.4	2.5	17.4	5.0	22.5	5.0	17
1983^{#}	Hawthorn	3	22	79	51	364	78	442	127	3.6	2.3	16.5	3.5	20.1	5.8	5
1984	Hawthorn	3	24	77	52	318	127	445	111	3.2	2.2	13.3	5.3	18.5	4.6	4
1985	Hawthorn	3	21	56	36	210	72	282	77	2.7	1.7	10.0	3.4	13.4	3.7	4
Career			332	915	722	6017	1357	7374	1505	2.8	2.2	18.2	4.1	22.3	4.5	202

== Head coaching record ==
Team	Year	Home and Away Season					Finals				
Team	Year	Won	Lost	Drew	Win %	Finish	Won	Lost	Drew	Win %	Result
COLL	1986	12	7	0	.632	6th out of 12	—	—	—	—	—
COLL	1987	7	15	0	.318	12th out of 14	—	—	—	—	—
COLL	1988	15	6	1	.705	2nd out of 14	0	2	0	.000	Lost to Melbourne in Semi Final
COLL	1989	13	9	0	.591	5th out of 14	0	1	0	.000	Lost to Melbourne in Elimination Final
COLL	1990	16	6	0	.727	2nd out of 14	3	0	1	.875	Defeated Essendon in Grand Final
COLL	1991	12	9	1	.568	7th out of 15	—	—	—	—	—
COLL	1992	16	6	0	.727	3rd out of 15	0	1	0	.000	Lost to St Kilda in Elimination Final
COLL	1993	11	9	0	.550	8th out of 15	—	—	—	—	—
COLL	1994	12	10	0	.545	8th out of 15	0	1	0	.000	Lost to West Coast in Elimination Final
COLL	1995	8	12	2	.409	10th out of 16	—	—	—	—	—
COLL total		122	89	4	.577		3	5	1	.389	
BRI	1999	16	6	0	.727	3rd out of 16	2	1	0	.667	Lost to North Melbourne in Preliminary Final
BRI	2000	12	10	0	.545	6th out of 16	1	1	0	.599	Lost to Carlton in Semi Final
BRI	2001	17	5	0	.773	2nd out of 16	3	0	0	1.000	Defeated Essendon in Grand Final
BRI	2002	17	5	0	.773	2nd out of 16	3	0	0	1.000	Defeated Collingwood in Grand Final
BRI	2003	14	7	1	.659	3rd out of 16	3	1	0	.750	Defeated Collingwood in Grand Final
BRI	2004	16	6	0	.727	2nd out of 16	1	1	0	.599	Lost to Port Adelaide in Grand Final
BRI	2005	10	11	0	.476	11th out of 16	—	—	—	—	—
BRI	2006	7	15	1	.326	13th out of 16	—	—	—	—	—
BRI	2007	9	11	2	.455	10th out of 16	—	—	—	—	—
BRI	2008	10	12	0	.455	10th out of 16	—	—	—	—	—
BRI total		128	88	3	.591		14	4	0	.778	
		250	177	7	.584		17	9	1	.648	

== Honours and achievements ==
=== Playing honours ===
Team

- 4× VFL premiership player (Hawthorn): 1971, 1976, 1978, 1983
- 2× Minor premiership (Hawthorn): 1971, 1975
- 2× Night Series Winner (Hawthorn): 1969, 1977

Individual

- VFLPA MVP Award (Later named the Leigh Matthews Trophy): 1982
- Coleman Medal: 1975
- All-Australian team: 1972
- Hawthorn Captain: 1981–1985
- 8× Peter Crimmins Medal: 1971, 1972, 1974, 1976, 1977, 1978, 1980, 1982
- 6× Hawthorn leading goalkicker: 1973, 1975, 1981, 1982, 1983, 1984
- Australian Football Media Association Player of the Year: 1982
- 2× Victoria Australian rules football team: 1972, 1975
- Australian Football League Team of the Century
- Hawthorn Football Club Team of the Century

=== Coaching honours ===
Team

- AFL Premiership coach (Collingwood): 1990
- 3× AFL Premiership coach (Brisbane Lions): 2001, 2002, 2003

Individual

- 4× Jock McHale Medal: 1990, 2001, 2002, 2003
- 3× All-Australian team: 2001, 2002, 2003
- Brisbane Lions Team of the Decade (1997–2006)

=== Hall of Fame/Life membership ===
- Australian Football Hall of Fame – Legend Status
- Hawthorn Football Club Hall of Fame – Legend Status
- Collingwood Hall of Fame (1990 premiership team)
- Brisbane Lions Hall of Fame
- Queensland Hall of Fame – Legend status
- Hawthorn life member
- Brisbane Lions life member

== Post-career honours ==
Matthews was named "Player of the Century" and inducted as an inaugural official Legend of the Australian Football Hall of Fame, the highest individual honour that can be bestowed upon a football personality. He was also named in both the AFL and Hawthorn teams of the century, in the forward pocket for the AFL and as rover for Hawthorn. In 2002, the AFLPA MVP award, of which Matthews was the inaugural recipient, was renamed the Leigh Matthews Trophy.

Matthews is one of only four Australian rules footballers recognised as a Legend of Australian Sport in the Sport Australia Hall of Fame, alongside Ron Barassi, Ted Whitten and Bob Skilton.

== Outside football ==
Before coaching the Brisbane Lions, Leigh Matthews made several media appearances as guest commentator. He since returned to perform special commentary of AFL matches on the Seven Network. Matthews commentated throughout the 2008 finals series as well as in the 2008 grand Final. He is also a commentator of the game for 3AW and a feature writer and commentator for the Herald Sun. He moved to Channel Nine in 2024 before leaving at the end of that year to move to Fox Footy in 2025.

== Bibliography ==
- Holmesby, Russell; Main, Jim (2011). The Encyclopedia of AFL Footballers: Every AFL/VFL Player Since 1987 (9th ed.). Bas Publishing.
