= 1976 VFL season =

80th season of the Victorian Football League (VFL)

1976 VFL premiership season
- Teams: 12
- Premiers: Hawthorn; 3rd premiership
- Minor premiers: Carlton; 13th minor premiership
- Brownlow Medallist: Graham Moss (Essendon)
- Coleman Medallist: Larry Donohue (Geelong)

Attendance
- Matches played: 138
- Total attendance: 3,288,470 (23,829 per match)
- Highest: 110,143

The 1976 VFL season was the 80th season of the Victorian Football League (VFL), the highest level senior Australian rules football competition in Victoria. The season featured twelve clubs, ran from 3 April until 25 September, and comprised a 22-game home-and-away season followed by a finals series featuring the top five clubs.

The premiership was won by the Hawthorn Football Club for the third time, after it defeated North Melbourne by 30 points in the 1976 VFL Grand Final.

== Background ==
In 1976, the VFL competition consisted of twelve teams of 18 on-the-field players each, plus two substitute players, known as the 19th man and the 20th man. A player could be substituted for any reason; however, once substituted, a player could not return to the field of play under any circumstances.

Teams played each other in a home-and-away season of 22 rounds; matches 12 to 22 were the "home-and-away reverse" of matches 1 to 11 (except that rounds 14 and 15 were the reverse of 4 and 3 respectively).

Once the 22 round home-and-away season had finished, the 1976 VFL Premiers were determined by the specific format and conventions of the "McIntyre final five system".

== Home-and-away season ==
=== Round 1 ===
Home team	Home team score	Away team	Away team score	Venue	Crowd	Date
Carlton	18.22 (130)	Collingwood	10.13 (73)	Princes Park	39,964	3 April 1976
North Melbourne	9.10 (64)	Melbourne	11.21 (87)	Arden Street Oval	17,986	3 April 1976
St Kilda	13.11 (89)	Hawthorn	16.15 (111)	Moorabbin Oval	22,879	3 April 1976
South Melbourne	23.15 (153)	Geelong	25.7 (157)	Lake Oval	15,173	3 April 1976
Richmond	16.21 (117)	Fitzroy	14.14 (98)	MCG	28,834	3 April 1976
Footscray	16.16 (112)	Essendon	16.17 (113)	Western Oval	25,274	3 April 1976

=== Round 2 ===
Home team	Home team score	Away team	Away team score	Venue	Crowd	Date
Hawthorn	20.11 (131)	North Melbourne	16.13 (109)	Princes Park	14,586	10 April 1976
Geelong	22.11 (143)	Richmond	14.11 (95)	Kardinia Park	20,443	10 April 1976
Fitzroy	14.17 (101)	St Kilda	15.15 (105)	Junction Oval	15,682	10 April 1976
Collingwood	16.27 (123)	South Melbourne	20.14 (134)	Victoria Park	25,410	10 April 1976
Melbourne	16.9 (105)	Footscray	23.15 (153)	MCG	26,707	10 April 1976
Essendon	12.16 (88)	Carlton	14.16 (100)	Windy Hill	26,687	10 April 1976

=== Round 3 ===
Home team	Home team score	Away team	Away team score	Venue	Crowd	Date
Footscray	20.14 (134)	South Melbourne	14.11 (95)	Western Oval	22,580	17 April 1976
Hawthorn	25.22 (172)	Collingwood	12.12 (84)	Princes Park	23,375	17 April 1976
Fitzroy	6.12 (48)	Carlton	14.13 (97)	VFL Park	32,648	17 April 1976
Essendon	15.8 (98)	Melbourne	20.13 (133)	Windy Hill	21,167	19 April 1976
Richmond	14.18 (102)	North Melbourne	12.11 (83)	MCG	41,413	19 April 1976
St Kilda	16.10 (106)	Geelong	12.14 (86)	Moorabbin Oval	26,931	19 April 1976

=== Round 4 ===
Home team	Home team score	Away team	Away team score	Venue	Crowd	Date
North Melbourne	17.15 (117)	St Kilda	14.12 (96)	Arden Street Oval	15,604	24 April 1976
Collingwood	16.18 (114)	Richmond	15.9 (99)	Victoria Park	27,009	24 April 1976
Geelong	19.12 (126)	Fitzroy	13.13 (91)	Kardinia Park	16,244	24 April 1976
South Melbourne	22.11 (143)	Essendon	16.13 (109)	Lake Oval	17,300	24 April 1976
Melbourne	17.12 (114)	Carlton	24.13 (157)	MCG	34,991	24 April 1976
Hawthorn	14.20 (104)	Footscray	14.8 (92)	VFL Park	27,040	24 April 1976

=== Round 5 ===
Home team	Home team score	Away team	Away team score	Venue	Crowd	Date
Fitzroy	15.13 (103)	Melbourne	17.13 (115)	Junction Oval	11,131	1 May 1976
Essendon	10.15 (75)	Hawthorn	14.10 (94)	Windy Hill	14,389	1 May 1976
Carlton	8.19 (67)	South Melbourne	9.12 (66)	Princes Park	20,327	1 May 1976
Richmond	12.17 (89)	Footscray	15.20 (110)	MCG	31,434	1 May 1976
St Kilda	19.19 (133)	Collingwood	16.6 (102)	Moorabbin Oval	28,737	1 May 1976
Geelong	15.6 (96)	North Melbourne	13.12 (90)	VFL Park	20,760	1 May 1976

=== Round 6 ===
Home team	Home team score	Away team	Away team score	Venue	Crowd	Date
Footscray	11.9 (75)	St Kilda	10.10 (70)	Western Oval	19,978	8 May 1976
Collingwood	14.13 (97)	Geelong	15.13 (103)	Victoria Park	23,428	8 May 1976
South Melbourne	16.12 (108)	Melbourne	21.10 (136)	Lake Oval	14,270	8 May 1976
North Melbourne	19.21 (135)	Fitzroy	9.9 (63)	Arden Street Oval	10,342	8 May 1976
Hawthorn	7.20 (62)	Carlton	15.12 (102)	Princes Park	27,055	8 May 1976
Richmond	17.17 (119)	Essendon	9.10 (64)	VFL Park	27,631	8 May 1976

=== Round 7 ===
Home team	Home team score	Away team	Away team score	Venue	Crowd	Date
Fitzroy	11.22 (88)	South Melbourne	12.15 (87)	Junction Oval	11,267	15 May 1976
Carlton	21.14 (140)	Richmond	9.15 (69)	Princes Park	30,095	15 May 1976
Melbourne	14.13 (97)	Hawthorn	21.19 (145)	MCG	25,876	15 May 1976
Geelong	13.17 (95)	Footscray	14.9 (93)	Kardinia Park	30,395	15 May 1976
St Kilda	9.15 (69)	Essendon	14.13 (97)	Moorabbin Oval	19,864	15 May 1976
North Melbourne	5.16 (46)	Collingwood	11.9 (75)	VFL Park	34,051	15 May 1976

=== Round 8 ===
Home team	Home team score	Away team	Away team score	Venue	Crowd	Date
Hawthorn	20.16 (136)	South Melbourne	11.10 (76)	Princes Park	7,674	22 May 1976
Footscray	7.3 (45)	North Melbourne	14.11 (95)	Western Oval	24,495	22 May 1976
Essendon	14.10 (94)	Geelong	12.12 (84)	Windy Hill	14,618	22 May 1976
Collingwood	15.11 (101)	Fitzroy	9.19 (73)	Victoria Park	16,880	22 May 1976
Richmond	14.11 (95)	Melbourne	9.15 (69)	MCG	22,145	22 May 1976
St Kilda	15.14 (104)	Carlton	9.12 (66)	VFL Park	15,148	22 May 1976

=== Round 9 ===
Home team	Home team score	Away team	Away team score	Venue	Crowd	Date
Melbourne	15.19 (109)	St Kilda	7.13 (55)	MCG	26,094	29 May 1976
South Melbourne	13.18 (96)	Richmond	13.10 (88)	Lake Oval	14,222	29 May 1976
Hawthorn	18.15 (123)	Fitzroy	14.12 (96)	Princes Park	8,784	29 May 1976
North Melbourne	8.10 (58)	Essendon	7.12 (54)	Arden Street Oval	19,990	29 May 1976
Geelong	14.18 (102)	Carlton	12.10 (82)	Kardinia Park	27,649	29 May 1976
Collingwood	10.16 (76)	Footscray	13.8 (86)	VFL Park	36,042	29 May 1976

=== Round 10 ===
Home team	Home team score	Away team	Away team score	Venue	Crowd	Date
St Kilda	12.27 (99)	South Melbourne	19.10 (124)	Moorabbin Oval	18,969	5 June 1976
Fitzroy	12.15 (87)	Footscray	13.13 (91)	Junction Oval	12,439	5 June 1976
Carlton	11.10 (76)	North Melbourne	11.15 (81)	Princes Park	24,492	5 June 1976
Richmond	13.10 (88)	Hawthorn	15.10 (100)	MCG	29,608	5 June 1976
Essendon	14.19 (103)	Collingwood	13.16 (94)	Windy Hill	25,450	5 June 1976
Geelong	19.8 (122)	Melbourne	13.15 (93)	VFL Park	27,469	5 June 1976

=== Round 11 ===
Home team	Home team score	Away team	Away team score	Venue	Crowd	Date
St Kilda	19.13 (127)	Richmond	15.6 (96)	Moorabbin Oval	21,681	12 June 1976
South Melbourne	14.11 (95)	North Melbourne	18.13 (121)	Lake Oval	19,008	12 June 1976
Melbourne	12.16 (88)	Collingwood	12.18 (90)	MCG	39,314	12 June 1976
Hawthorn	11.22 (88)	Geelong	11.10 (76)	Princes Park	33,594	14 June 1976
Footscray	11.15 (81)	Carlton	9.10 (64)	Western Oval	34,814	14 June 1976
Essendon	13.22 (100)	Fitzroy	16.14 (110)	VFL Park	25,558	14 June 1976

=== Round 12 ===
Home team	Home team score	Away team	Away team score	Venue	Crowd	Date
Hawthorn	13.19 (97)	St Kilda	18.14 (122)	Princes Park	14,072	19 June 1976
Geelong	23.17 (155)	South Melbourne	6.15 (51)	Kardinia Park	17,731	19 June 1976
Fitzroy	22.14 (146)	Richmond	13.12 (90)	Junction Oval	12,644	19 June 1976
Essendon	12.17 (89)	Footscray	12.7 (79)	Windy Hill	18,863	19 June 1976
Collingwood	12.10 (82)	Carlton	8.8 (56)	Victoria Park	28,537	19 June 1976
Melbourne	8.13 (61)	North Melbourne	22.14 (146)	VFL Park	20,529	19 June 1976

=== Round 13 ===
Home team	Home team score	Away team	Away team score	Venue	Crowd	Date
Footscray	7.10 (52)	Melbourne	14.20 (104)	Western Oval	13,464	26 June 1976
Carlton	11.19 (85)	Essendon	9.14 (68)	Princes Park	24,826	26 June 1976
North Melbourne	9.13 (67)	Hawthorn	10.15 (75)	Arden Street Oval	16,230	26 June 1976
Richmond	15.12 (102)	Geelong	14.14 (98)	MCG	28,608	26 June 1976
St Kilda	11.10 (76)	Fitzroy	13.17 (95)	Moorabbin Oval	17,861	26 June 1976
South Melbourne	17.19 (121)	Collingwood	11.16 (82)	VFL Park	28,537	26 June 1976

=== Round 14 ===
Home team	Home team score	Away team	Away team score	Venue	Crowd	Date
Footscray	5.7 (37)	Hawthorn	17.15 (117)	Western Oval	13,307	3 July 1976
Fitzroy	17.17 (119)	Geelong	13.18 (96)	Junction Oval	13,788	3 July 1976
Essendon	13.15 (93)	South Melbourne	12.6 (78)	Windy Hill	14,462	3 July 1976
St Kilda	10.12 (72)	North Melbourne	13.11 (89)	Moorabbin Oval	18,486	3 July 1976
Richmond	23.13 (151)	Collingwood	7.14 (56)	MCG	36,477	3 July 1976
Carlton	18.7 (115)	Melbourne	6.22 (58)	VFL Park	24,366	3 July 1976

=== Round 15 ===
Home team	Home team score	Away team	Away team score	Venue	Crowd	Date
North Melbourne	12.10 (82)	Richmond	11.11 (77)	Arden Street Oval	18,421	10 July 1976
Geelong	15.12 (102)	St Kilda	9.9 (63)	Kardinia Park	21,213	10 July 1976
Carlton	12.8 (80)	Fitzroy	10.16 (76)	Princes Park	25,340	10 July 1976
South Melbourne	20.16 (136)	Footscray	17.14 (116)	Lake Oval	12,226	10 July 1976
Melbourne	15.14 (104)	Essendon	18.11 (119)	MCG	25,009	10 July 1976
Collingwood	16.11 (107)	Hawthorn	18.11 (119)	VFL Park	27,353	10 July 1976

=== Round 16 ===
Home team	Home team score	Away team	Away team score	Venue	Crowd	Date
Collingwood	15.14 (104)	St Kilda	18.13 (121)	Victoria Park	22,680	17 July 1976
North Melbourne	22.13 (145)	Geelong	12.6 (78)	Arden Street Oval	19,334	17 July 1976
Melbourne	21.20 (146)	Fitzroy	15.16 (106)	MCG	16,187	17 July 1976
Hawthorn	15.17 (107)	Essendon	18.15 (123)	Princes Park	16,257	17 July 1976
South Melbourne	14.10 (94)	Carlton	15.10 (100)	Lake Oval	17,395	17 July 1976
Footscray	15.6 (96)	Richmond	12.19 (91)	VFL Park	22,795	17 July 1976

=== Round 17 ===
Home team	Home team score	Away team	Away team score	Venue	Crowd	Date
Fitzroy	11.7 (73)	North Melbourne	13.14 (92)	Junction Oval	12,614	24 July 1976
Essendon	8.15 (63)	Richmond	15.16 (106)	Windy Hill	21,585	24 July 1976
Carlton	17.14 (116)	Hawthorn	11.19 (85)	Princes Park	26,164	24 July 1976
St Kilda	17.16 (118)	Footscray	15.14 (104)	Moorabbin Oval	19,882	24 July 1976
Geelong	15.9 (99)	Collingwood	11.27 (93)	Kardinia Park	22,349	24 July 1976
Melbourne	11.13 (79)	South Melbourne	14.9 (93)	VFL Park	17,580	24 July 1976

=== Round 18 ===
Home team	Home team score	Away team	Away team score	Venue	Crowd	Date
Hawthorn	16.17 (113)	Melbourne	14.11 (95)	Princes Park	7,519	31 July 1976
Footscray	13.8 (86)	Geelong	10.14 (74)	Western Oval	16,069	31 July 1976
Collingwood	8.10 (58)	North Melbourne	9.8 (62)	Victoria Park	19,464	31 July 1976
South Melbourne	16.11 (107)	Fitzroy	11.14 (80)	Lake Oval	9,784	31 July 1976
Richmond	8.17 (65)	Carlton	22.16 (148)	MCG	39,744	31 July 1976
Essendon	12.7 (79)	St Kilda	17.15 (117)	VFL Park	26,572	31 July 1976

=== Round 19 ===
Home team	Home team score	Away team	Away team score	Venue	Crowd	Date
Melbourne	17.17 (119)	Richmond	13.11 (89)	MCG	16,585	7 August 1976
Carlton	22.19 (151)	St Kilda	7.8 (50)	Princes Park	19,356	7 August 1976
North Melbourne	8.13 (61)	Footscray	7.8 (50)	Arden Street Oval	13,719	7 August 1976
Geelong	18.8 (116)	Essendon	18.14 (122)	Kardinia Park	17,762	7 August 1976
Fitzroy	17.15 (117)	Collingwood	9.16 (70)	Junction Oval	12,247	7 August 1976
South Melbourne	12.11 (83)	Hawthorn	13.19 (97)	VFL Park	18,640	7 August 1976

=== Round 20 ===
Home team	Home team score	Away team	Away team score	Venue	Crowd	Date
Richmond	16.14 (110)	South Melbourne	12.12 (84)	MCG	20,817	14 August 1976
Fitzroy	12.19 (91)	Hawthorn	14.10 (94)	Junction Oval	10,417	14 August 1976
Essendon	10.9 (69)	North Melbourne	14.11 (95)	Windy Hill	22,474	14 August 1976
St Kilda	13.14 (92)	Melbourne	18.21 (129)	Moorabbin Oval	18,089	14 August 1976
Footscray	18.16 (124)	Collingwood	15.9 (99)	Western Oval	17,805	14 August 1976
Carlton	11.16 (82)	Geelong	5.12 (42)	VFL Park	35,279	14 August 1976

=== Round 21 ===
Home team	Home team score	Away team	Away team score	Venue	Crowd	Date
Hawthorn	11.16 (82)	Richmond	17.12 (114)	Princes Park	13,574	21 August 1976
Collingwood	20.20 (140)	Essendon	12.17 (89)	Victoria Park	19,036	21 August 1976
South Melbourne	15.18 (108)	St Kilda	10.6 (66)	Lake Oval	12,997	21 August 1976
Melbourne	22.18 (150)	Geelong	16.9 (105)	MCG	28,130	21 August 1976
North Melbourne	10.15 (75)	Carlton	18.16 (124)	Arden Street Oval	26,455	21 August 1976
Footscray	4.11 (35)	Fitzroy	3.16 (34)	VFL Park	15,638	21 August 1976

=== Round 22 ===
Home team	Home team score	Away team	Away team score	Venue	Crowd	Date
North Melbourne	19.14 (128)	South Melbourne	12.19 (91)	Arden Street Oval	14,196	28 August 1976
Geelong	13.18 (96)	Hawthorn	10.11 (71)	Kardinia Park	22,916	28 August 1976
Collingwood	17.11 (113)	Melbourne	18.20 (128)	Victoria Park	28,354	28 August 1976
Carlton	15.17 (107)	Footscray	15.17 (107)	Princes Park	27,958	28 August 1976
Fitzroy	15.20 (110)	Essendon	10.18 (78)	Junction Oval	11,721	28 August 1976
Richmond	21.14 (140)	St Kilda	14.22 (106)	VFL Park	27,249	28 August 1976

== Ladder ==
(P)	Premiers
	Qualified for finals

#	Team	P	W	L	D	PF	PA	%	Pts
1	Carlton	22	16	5	1	2245	1690	132.8	66
2	Hawthorn (P)	22	16	6	0	2323	2035	114.2	64
3	North Melbourne	22	15	7	0	2041	1748	116.8	60
4	Geelong	22	12	10	0	2251	2166	103.9	48
5	Footscray	22	11	10	1	1958	2023	96.8	46
6	Melbourne	22	11	11	0	2319	2333	99.4	44
7	Richmond	22	10	12	0	2192	2224	98.6	40
8	South Melbourne	22	9	13	0	2223	2364	94.0	36
9	St Kilda	22	9	13	0	2056	2282	90.1	36
10	Essendon	22	9	13	0	1987	2253	88.2	36
11	Fitzroy	22	7	15	0	2005	2161	92.8	28
12	Collingwood	22	6	16	0	2033	2354	86.4	24

Rules for classification: 1. premiership points; 2. percentage; 3. points for
Average score: 97.1
Source: AFL Tables

== Finals series ==
=== Finals week 1 ===
Home team	Score	Away team	Score	Venue	Crowd	Date
Geelong	14.18 (102)	Footscray	14.11 (95)	VFL Park	50,686	4 September
Hawthorn	14.19 (103)	North Melbourne	12.11 (83)	MCG	64,148	4 September

=== Finals week 2 ===
Home team	Score	Away team	Score	Venue	Crowd	Date
Geelong	8.12 (60)	North Melbourne	14.9 (93)	MCG	71,042	11 September
Carlton	9.16 (70)	Hawthorn	12.15 (87)	VFL Park	60,105	11 September

=== Preliminary final ===
Home team	Score	Away team	Score	Venue	Crowd	Date
Carlton	9.12 (66)	North Melbourne	10.7 (67)	VFL Park	69,234	18 September

=== Grand final ===
Home team	Score	Away team	Score	Venue	Crowd	Date
Hawthorn	13.22 (100)	North Melbourne	10.10 (70)	MCG	110,143	25 September

== Season notes ==
- The VFL introduced two field umpires per match.
- John Nicholls resigned as coach of Carlton three days before the VFL season commenced. Assistant coach Ian Thorogood was promoted to coach.
- The opening round match between South Melbourne and Geelong at the Lake Oval saw the Swans set a new record for the highest losing score on record, beating Melbourne's 1940 previous record.
- The Round 1 match between Carlton and Collingwood at Princes Park saw a massive all-in brawl that involved virtually every player from both sides, with Collingwood's Phil Carman the chief target.
- In Round 10, North Melbourne's Malcolm Blight kicked a booming torpedo punt 65–70 metres out from goal after the final siren at Princes Park, which sailed through for a goal that won the match for North Melbourne. HSV Channel 7 football commentator Michael Williamson exclaimed after the match, "I have seen it all, now. I have seen it all!!" ("The Sensational Seventies -- 1976." Screened on HSV 7 Melbourne in September 1979)
- The Round 21 match between Footscray and Fitzroy at VFL Park was the first match to provide the lowest two scores of a season.
- Collingwood "won" its maiden wooden spoon after seventy-nine years, leaving Carlton as the only foundation VFL team yet to finish last. Carlton would "win" its maiden wooden spoon twenty-six years later in 2002.
- Collingwood's six wins is the most by a wooden spooner in VFL/AFL history.

== Awards ==
- The 1976 VFL Premiership team was Hawthorn.
- The VFL's leading goalkicker was Larry Donohue of Geelong who kicked 105 goals (including 6 goals in the finals).
- The winner of the 1976 Brownlow Medal was Graham Moss of Essendon with 48 votes.
- Collingwood took the "wooden spoon" for the first time in 1976.
- The reserves premiership was won by Collingwood. Collingwood 23.17 (155) defeated North Melbourne 19.15 (129) in the grand final, held as a curtain-raiser to the seniors Grand Final at the Melbourne Cricket Ground on 25 September.

== Sources ==
- 1976 VFL season at AFL Tables
- 1976 VFL season at Australian Football
