= 2019 National Rugby Championship =

- Countries: Australia; Fiji
- Date: 31 August – 26 October
- Champions: Western Force
- Runners-up: Canberra Vikings
- Matches played: 31
- Attendance: 57,800 (average 1,865 per match)
- Highest attendance: 6,500 (Western Force 41-3 Canberra Vikings)

Official website
- www.rugby.com.au/competitions/nrc

The 2019 National Rugby Championship was the sixth season of the top flight of Australian domestic rugby union. The competition began on 31 August and concluded on 26 October. The match of the round was broadcast live each week on Fox Sports and Kayo Sports, with all matches streamed on rugby.com.au live. The championship featured eight professional teams, seven from Australia and one from Fiji.

== Teams ==
The eight teams for the 2019 NRC season include two from New South Wales, two from Queensland, and one each from Australian Capital Territory, Victoria, Western Australia, and Fiji:

Region	Team	Coach	Captain	Ref
Australian Capital Territory	Canberra Vikings	Nick Scrivener	Darcy Swain	
Fiji	Fijian Drua	Senirusi Seruvakula	Eremasi Radrodro	
New South Wales	NSW Country	Robert Taylor	Ned Hanigan	
New South Wales	Sydney	Chris Whitaker	Lalakai Foketi	
Queensland	Brisbane City	Jim McKay	Fraser McReight	
Queensland	Queensland Country	Rod Seib	Angus Scott-Young	
Victoria	Melbourne Rising	Pom Simona	Semisi Tupou	
Western Australia	Western Force	Tim Sampson	Ian Prior	

== Television coverage and streaming ==
One NRC match per round is broadcast live via Fox Sports. All matches are also shown live on the Kayo Sports and Rugby.com.au streaming platforms.

== Experimental Law Variations ==
Two new trial variations were included for the 2019 NRC.

- A 50:22 kick, whereby a team kicking the ball indirectly into touch (i.e. not on the full) is awarded the resulting lineout throw if the ball is kicked: (a) from within the team's own half and finds touch in the opposition's 22; or (b) from within the team's own 22 and finds touch in the opposition's half.
- A goal line drop-out, awarded to the defending team if an attacking player brings the ball into the in-goal and is held up.
NRC Law Variations 2019

Existing Law of the Game	Variation
Television Match Official / Global law trial: Law 5: 15. A match organiser may appoint a television match official (TMO), who uses technological devices to clarify situations relating to: 1. The grounding of the ball in in-goal.; 2. Touch or touch-in-goal in the act of grounding the ball or the ball being made dead.; 3. Where there is doubt as to whether a kick at goal has been successful.; 4. Where match officials believe an infringement may have occurred in the playing area leading to a try or preventing a try.; 5. Foul play, including sanctions.; 16. Any of the match officials, including the TMO, may recommend a review by the TMO. The reviews will take place in accordance with the TMO protocol.	Television match official to only be consulted about tries and in-goal plays.
Conversion: Law 8: 8. (d) [The kicker] takes the kick within 90 seconds (playing time) from the time the try was awarded, even if the ball rolls over and has to be placed again.; Sanction: Kick is disallowed.	Time limit reduced to 60 seconds for conversion kicks.
Penalty goal: Law 8: 21. The kick must be taken within 60 seconds (playing time) from the time the team indicated their intention to do so, even if the ball rolls over and has to be placed again.; Sanction: Kick is disallowed and a scrum is awarded.	Time limit reduced to 45 seconds for penalty kicks.
During a maul: Law 16: 8. The ball-carrier in a maul may go to ground provided that player makes the ball available immediately. Sanction: Scrum.; 9. All other players in a maul must endeavour to stay on their feet.; 10. All players in a maul must be caught in or bound to it and not just alongside it.; 11. Players must not: 1. Intentionally collapse a maul or jump on top of it.; 2. Attempt to drag an opponent out of a maul.; Sanction: Penalty.	Greater policing of this law, in order to discourage "hold up tackles", by ensuring that the tackler, who holds up a ball carrier in an effort to form a maul, does not collapse the maul as soon as it has formed.
Quick throw: Law 18: 5. A quick throw is disallowed and a lineout is awarded to the same team if: 1. A lineout had already been formed; or 2. The ball had been touched after it went into touch by anyone other than the player throwing in or the player who carried the ball into touch; or 3. A different ball is used from the one that originally went into touch.	Players will be allowed to take quick throw-ins regardless of whether someone else has touched the ball
Lineout: Law 18: 8. Where the game is restarted with a lineout and which team throws in ...	For a 50:22 kick, where the team in possession kicks the ball indirectly into touch from either: (a) within their own half to find touch in the opposition's 22; or (b) from within their own 22 to find touch in the opposition's half; then the throw in to the resulting lineout is awarded to the kicking team at the location where the ball reached the touchline.
Location of a penalty or free kick: Law 20: 2. A penalty or free-kick is taken from where it is awarded or anywhere behind it on a line through the mark and parallel to the touchlines. When a penalty or free-kick is taken at the wrong place, it must be re-taken.	Increased latitude will be given to where penalty and free kicks are to be taken
Ball held up in-goal: Law 21: 17. When a player carrying the ball is held up in the in-goal so that the player cannot ground or play the ball, the ball is dead. Play restarts with a five-metre scrum, in line with the place where the player was held up. The attacking team throws in.	Play restarts with a goal-line drop out awarded to the defending team. Rationale: To reward good defence and promote a faster rate of play.
Competition rule - Bonus point awarded for scoring 4 tries	Bonus point awarded if a winning team scores at least 3 more tries than its opponent. This particular system was first used in the French professional leagues during the 2007–08 northern hemisphere season.

== Regular season ==
The eight teams competed in a round-robin tournament for the regular season. During this section of the competition, teams also played for the Horan-Little Shield, a challenge trophy put on the line when a challenge is accepted by the holders or mandated by the terms of the competition.

The regular season standings were determined via a slightly modified version of the standard competition points system— the same system as was used for The Rugby Championship and Super Rugby—with a bonus point awarded to a winning team scoring at least 3 more tries than their opponent; and a bonus point awarded to a losing team defeated by a margin of 7 points or under. Four points were awarded for a win and none for a loss; two points were awarded to each team for a draw.

Each team's placement was based on its cumulative points total, including any bonus points earned. For teams level on table points, tiebreakers apply in the following order:

1. Difference between points for and against during the season.
2. Head-to-head match result(s) between the tied teams.
3. Total number tries scored during the season.

The top four teams at the end of the regular season qualified for the title play-offs in the form of semi-finals followed by a final to determine the champion team.

=== Standings ===
National Rugby Championship
#	Team	P	W	D	L	PF	PA	PD	TF	TA	TB	LB	Pts
1	Western Force	7	6	0	1	285	213	+72	45	31	4	0	28
2	Canberra Vikings	7	5	0	2	238	211	+27	36	33	2	0	22
3	Fijian Drua	7	3	2	2	231	214	+17	33	34	1	0	17
4	Brisbane City	7	3	1	3	214	199	+15	34	29	1	2	17
5	NSW Country HL	7	3	1	3	181	172	+9	28	26	0	2	16
6	Queensland Country	7	3	0	4	205	235	–30	30	35	1	2	15
7	Melbourne Rising	7	2	0	5	206	211	–5	30	33	1	2	11
8	Sydney	7	1	0	6	220	325	−105	34	50	1	1	6
Updated: 12 October 2019 Source: rugbyarchive.net • Teams 1 to 4 (Green background) at the end of the regular season qualify for the title playoffs. HL denotes the holder of the Horan-Little Shield.

=== Team progression ===
	NRC team progression						
Team	Round 1	Round 2	Round 3	Round 4	Round 5	Round 6	Round 7
Brisbane City	2 (4th)	7 (3rd)	8 (4th)	12 (2nd)	12 (4th)	13 (6th)	17 (4th)
Canberra Vikings	5 (1st)	5 (5th)	9 (3rd)	9 (4th)	14 (3rd)	18 (2nd)	22 (2nd)
Fijian Drua	2 (5th)	2 (6th)	4 (7th)	9 (5th)	9 (7th)	13 (5th)	17 (3rd)
Melbourne Rising	0 (8th)	0 (8th)	0 (8th)	5 (8th)	9 (6th)	10 (7th)	11 (7th)
NSW Country	4 (2nd)	8 (2nd)	10 (2nd)	11 (3rd)	15 (2nd)	16 (3rd)	16 (5th)
Queensland Country	1 (6th)	6 (4th)	6 (5th)	6 (6th)	10 (5th)	14 (4th)	15 (6th)
Sydney	1 (7th)	1 (7th)	6 (6th)	6 (7th)	6 (8th)	6 (8th)	6 (8th)
Western Force	4 (3rd)	9 (1st)	14 (1st)	19 (1st)	19 (1st)	23 (1st)	28 (1st)
The table above shows a team's progression throughout the season. For each round, their cumulative points total is shown with the overall log position in brackets.
Key:	win	draw	loss	bye			

=== Competition rounds ===
==== Round 1 ====
^{FS} 31 August	NSW Country	38–33	Sydney	Apex Oval, Dubbo
12.00pm AEST	Try: Vea (2) 2', 63'; Clements 8'; Sandell 12' m Bell 16', Grant 69' m Con: Kane (4/6) 3' 9' 17' 64'; Cards: Hanigan (YC) 49'	Summary	Try: Swinton 32'; Harrison 36' m Vui 50', Foketi 54'; Poidevin 79'; Con: Harrison (3/4) 33' 51' 55'; Donaldson (1/1) 79'	Attendance: 1,000; Referee: Angus Gardner (Australia)

31 August	Melbourne Rising	22–47	Canberra Vikings	Box Hill Rugby Club, Melbourne
1.30pm AEST	Try: Masters 55' m Tupou 63'; Haylett-Petty 80'; Con: Moloney (2/3) 64' 80'; Pen: Moloney (1/1) 4'	Summary	Try: Simone 8'; Hansen 12'; Muirhead 27'; Pulu 34', Samu 42' m Lolesio 59', Wright 75'; Con: Lonergan (6/7) 9' 13' 28' 35' 60' 76'	Attendance: 750; Referee: Damon Murphy (Australia)

31 August	Brisbane City	22–22	Fijian Drua	GPS Rugby Club, Brisbane
3.00pm AEST	Try: Paisami 9' m Tela 22'; Naivalu 38' m Chapman 76' m Con: Lucas (1/4) 22'	Summary	Try: Nacebe (2) 3' m, 62' m Veitayaki 29'; Con: Vularika (2/3) 30' 63'; Pen: Vularika (1/1) 19'	Attendance: 3,000; Referee: Nic Berry (Australia)

31 August	Western Force	50–49	Queensland Country	UWA Rugby Park, Perth
3.00pm AWST	Try: Jooste (2) 25', 57 m Tessmann 8'; McGregor 14'; Tizzano 34'; Hardman 47' m Lee-Warner 63'; Placid 74' m Con: Deegan (5/7) 9' 16' 35' 48' 64'; Ian Prior (0/1)	Summary	Try: Daugunu (2) 17', 22'; Fittock 2'; James 11'; Blyth 29'; McDermott 44'; Saifoloi 51'; Con: Saifoloi (7/7) 3' 12' 18' 23' 31' 45' 52'; Cards: Daugunu (YC) 74'	Attendance: 2,000; Referee: Graham Cooper (Australia)

==== Round 2 ====
Horan-Little Challenge	7 September	Fijian Drua	15–38	Western Force	ANZ Stadium, Suva
	3.00pm FJT	Try: Vularika 18'; Kurumudu 43'; Con: Nacebe (1/1) 23'; Pen: Nacebe (1/1) 23'	Summary	Try: Placid (3) 6' 12' m 69'; Ferris 24'; Ralston 38'; Strachan 59' m Con: Deegan (3/5) 7' 25' 39'; Prior (1/1) 70'	Attendance: 1,500; Referee: Aaron Pook (Australia)

^{FS} 7 September	Melbourne Rising	19–29	NSW Country	Bailey Reserve, Adelaide
3.30pm ACST	Try: Ukalele 4'; Haylett-Petty 40'; Marsters 58'; Con: Moloney (1/2) 40+1'; Tupou (1/1) 59'	Summary	Try: Blacklock (2) 1' 10'; Ah Wong 15'; Vest 32'; Clements 41'; Con: Kane (2/5) 11' 15'; Cards: Tafa (YC) 76'	Attendance: 2,000; Referee: Matthew Kellahan (Australia)

8 September	Brisbane City	52–26	Sydney	Bond University, Gold Coast
1.00pm AEST	Try: Luke (3) 5' m, 44' m, 66'; Henry 17', Fe'ao 22' m Wallis 63'; Konelio (2) 69' m 75' m Con: Henry (2/5) 19' 64'; Lucas (1/3) 68'; Pen: Henry (2) 2' 32'	Summary	Try: Graham (2) 19' m, 36'; Kioa 28'; Swinton 48'; Con: Edmed (3/4) 30' 37' 49'	Attendance: 1,500^{a} Referee: Reuben Keane (Australia)

8 September	Queensland Country	36–23	Canberra Vikings	Bond University, Gold Coast
3.00pm AEST	Try: Hoopert 5'; McDermott 23', Fittock 35' m Francis 53', Stewart 65' m Wilson 73' m Con: Gordon (3/5) 6' 24' 54'; Stewart (0/1); Cards: Gordon (YC) 80+1'	Summary	Try: Hansen (2) 26' m, 29' m Muirhead 39'; Con: Lonergan (1/3) 40'; Pen: Lonergan (2/2) 8' 50'; Cards: Wright (YC) 20'	Attendance: 1,500^{a} Referee: Brett Cronan (Australia)

==== Round 3 ====
^{FS} 14 September	Sydney	47–26	Queensland Country	Woollahra Oval, Sydney
12.00pm AEST	Try: Clark (2) 26' 33'; Foketi (2) 28' 65' m Gamble 2', Burey 51'; Graham 57'; Con: Harrison (6/7) 2' 27' 30' 35' 52' 58'	Summary	Try: McDermott 8'; Saifoloi 15'; Fittock 42'; Lucas 73' m Con: Saifoloi (3/4) 10' 16' 44'	Attendance: 500; Referee: Damon Murphy (Australia)

14 September	Canberra Vikings	36–35	Brisbane City	Viking Park, Canberra
2.00pm AEST	Try: Ross 17'; Gersekowski 21'; Muirhead 32'; Pulu 40' m, Wright 51'; Con: Lonergan (4/5) 18' 22' 32' 52'; Pen: Lonergan (1/1) 73'; Cards: Gersekowski (YC) 27'; Abra (YC) 65'	Summary	Try: Paenga-Amosa (2) 23' 62'; Penalty try 37'; Tela 46'; Tualima 71'; Con: Lucas (4/4) 24' 47' 63' 71'	Attendance: 1,000; Referee: Aaron Pook (Australia)

14 September	NSW Country	24–24	Fijian Drua	WIN Stadium, Wollongong
4.00pm AEST	Try: Horton 12' m Gordon 33' m Nawaqanitawase 40+6'; Grant 80+1'; Con: Kane (1/3) 40+8'; O'Shea 80+2'; Cards: Kane (YC) 73'	Summary	Try: Matawalu 7'; Radaniva 18'; Tabulawaki 46'; Con: Malele (3/3) 7' 19' 47'; Pen: Vularika (1/2) 70'; Cards: Malele (YC)	Attendance: 1,250; Referee: James Quinn (Australia)

Horan-Little Challenge	15 September	Western Force	38–19	Melbourne Rising	UWA Rugby Park, Perth
	3.00pm AWST	Try: Ralston (3) 3' m, 23' 32'; Stander 43', Ready 52'; Bardoul 79' m Con: Prior (4/5) 24' 34' 44' 53'; Deegan (0/1); Cards: Deegan (YC) 45'	Summary	Try: Iona 11'; Hardwick 46'; Fa'amausili 71' m Con: So'oialo (2/2) 12' 47'; Iona (0/1)	Attendance: 2,500; Referee: Jordan Way (Australia)

==== Round 4 ====
^{FS} 21 September	Fijian Drua	76–29	Sydney	Churchill Park, Lautoka
2.00pm FJT	Try: Dyer (2) 23' 44'; Radrodro (2) 46' 67'; Wainiqolo 71' 73'; Matawalu 6', Nasova 13'; Koroiduadua 76' m Tikotani 79', Navori 80' m Con: Tikotani (9/11) 7' 14' 24' 45' 47' 68' 72' 75' 80'; Pen: Tikotani (1/1) 39'	Summary	Try: Craig (2) 3' 17' m Foketi (2) 40' 42' m Gamble 57' m Con: Harrison (2/5) 4' 40'	Attendance: 2,750; Referee: Jordan Way (Australia)

Horan-Little Challenge	21 September	Western Force	45–28	Canberra Vikings	UWA Rugby Park, Perth
	3.00pm AWST	Try: Placid (2) 27' m, 53'; Ralston 2'; Thrush 8'; Stander 46' m Feke 67', Kaitu'u 71'; Con: Prior (5/7) 3' 9' 54' 68' 72'	Summary	Try: Muirhead 10'; L·Lonergan 31'; Ikatau 52'; Enever 62'; Con: Lolesio (4/4) 11' 33' 53' 64'; Cards: Samu (YC) 57'	Attendance: 1,500; Referee: Aaron Pook (Australia)

22 September	Melbourne Rising	49–7	Queensland Country	Mars Stadium, Ballarat
1.00pm AEST	Try: Marsters (2) 5' 18'; Tupou (2) 75' 80'; Potter 52', Iona 58'; Sooaemalelagi 66'; Con: So'oialo (7/7) 6' 19' 53' 60' 67' 78' 80'	Summary	Try: Saifoloi 45'; Con: Saifoloi (1/1) 46'	Attendance: 500; Referee: James Quinn (Australia)

22 September	Brisbane City	24–19	NSW Country	Ballymore, Brisbane
4.00pm AEST	Try: Chapman (2) 25' 73'; Paenga-Amosa 19'; Naivalu 30'; Con: Lucas (2/4) 20' 74'	Summary	Try: Nawaqanitawase 57'; Walton 80'; Grant 80+1'; Con: O'Shea (2/3) 80' 80+2'; Cards: Staniforth (YC) 24'	Attendance: 2,700; Referee: Graham Cooper (Australia)

==== Round 5 ====
^{FS} 28 September	Canberra Vikings	41–28	Fijian Drua	Viking Park, Canberra
12.00pm AEST	Try: Pulu (2) 12' m, 27' m Banks (2) 40' 66'; Wright 7' m Lonergan 51'; Hansen 75' m Con: Lonergan (2/5) 40' 52'; Kuenzle (1/2) 67'	Summary	Try: Dyer 17'; Radaniva 34'; Radrodro 45'; Narequva 78'; Con: Malele (3/3) 17' 35' 46'; Dyer (1/1) 79'	Attendance: 1,600; Referee: James Quinn (Australia)

28 September	Queensland Country	42–26	Brisbane City	Marley Brown Oval, Gladstone
4.00pm AEST	Try: Wilson (2) 11' 19'; McDermott (2) 24' 69'; Boardman 28'; Daugunu 58'; Con: Saifoloi (6/6) 12' 21' 26' 29' 59' 70'; Cards: Daugunu (YC) 78'	Summary	Try: Lucas (2) 39' 72'; Paenga-Amosa 55' m McReight 62'; Con: Lucas (3/4) 40' 63' 73'; Cards: Ryan Smith (YC) 18'	Attendance: 2,000; Referee: Aaron Pook (Australia)

29 September	Sydney	26–40	Melbourne Rising	Forshaw Park, Sydney
1.00pm AEST	Try: Vui 19'; Short 49'; C. Abel 69' m Marr 77'; Con: Harrison (3/4) 20' 70' 78'	Summary	Try: Rangi (2) 3' 15'; Marsters (2) 26' 53'; Acheson 39'; Tuimalealiifano 65' m Con: So'oialo (4/4) 5' 16' 28' 40', Iona (0/1); Cards: Marsters (YC) 69'	Attendance: 750; Referee: Reuben Keane (Australia)

Horan-Little Challenge	29 September	NSW Country	38–24	Western Force	Regional Stadium, Port Macquarie
	3.00pm AEST	Try: Nawaqanitawase 6'; Gordon 10'; Penalty try 31'; Ah Wong 59', Woollett 67'; Con: Mason (1/1) 7'; O'Shea (3/3) 11' 60' 68'; Pen: O'Shea (1/1) 78'; Cards: Champion de Crespigny (YC) 16'	Summary	Try: Tessmann 18'; Feke 42'; Kaitu'u 63'; Placid 70'; Con: Prior 19' (1/3); Andrew Deegan (1/1) 70'; Cards: Tessmann (YC) 23'	Attendance: 1,500; Referee: Dru Tonks (Australia)

==== Round 6 ====
^{FS} 5 October	Canberra Vikings	36–26	Sydney	Viking Park, Canberra
12.00pm AEST	Try: Wright (2) 31' 56' m Swain 4' m Hansen 7'; Banks 40+1' m Penalty try 74'; Con: Kuenzle (2/5) 7' 33'; Cards: Powell (YC) 15'	Summary	Try: Penalty try 14'; McCauley 20'; Sinclair 68'; Moore 80' m Con: Harrison (2/2) 21' 69'; Donaldson (0/1); Cards: Harrison (YC) 74'	Attendance: 1,000; Referee: Brett Cronan (Australia)

5 October	Melbourne Rising	36–40	Fijian Drua	Casey Fields, Melbourne
5.30pm AEST	Try: Tuimalealiifano (2) 18' 36' m Ukalele 9', Gibbon 32'; Penalty try 73'; Con: So'oialo (3/4) 11' 20' 33'; Pen: So'oialo (1/1) 62'	Summary	Try: Wainiqolo (2) 49' 75' m Nacebe 4', Reece 43'; Navuma 51'; Vularika 63'; Con: Malele (5/6) 6' 44' 50' 53' 64'; Cards: Nasova (YC) 60'	Attendance: 2,000; Referee: Jordan Way (Australia)

6 October	Queensland Country	21–14	NSW Country	Bond University, Gold Coast
3.00pm AEST	Try: Boardman 58'; James 68'; Stewart 74'; Con: Saifoloi (3/3) 59' 70' 75'; Cards: Hoopert (YC) 16'	Summary	Try: Gordon 19'; Tuala 24'; Con: O'Shea (2/2) 21' 25'	Attendance: 1,500; Referee: Damon Murphy (Australia)

6 October	Western Force	33–31	Brisbane City	UWA Rugby Park, Perth
3.00pm AWST	Try: Tessmann 10'; Placid 34'; Thrush 40+2'; Sheminant 46'; Kaitu'u 61' m Con: Deegan (4/5) 11' 35' 40+4' 46'; Cards: Orr (YC) 79'	Summary	Try: Luke (2) 76' m 79' m Uru 21'; Lucas 31'; Korczyk 67; Con: Hegarty (3/5) 22' 32' 68'; Cards: Konelio (YC) 60'	Attendance: 3,000; Referee: James Quinn (Australia)

==== Round 7 ====
11 October	Canberra Vikings	27–19	NSW Country	Viking Park, Canberra
6.00pm AEDT	Try: Pulu 11'; Ikitau 29'; Samu 43'; Banks 52'; Con: Lonergan (2/4) 44' 53'; Pen: Lonergan (1/1) 15'	Summary	Try: Nawaqanitawase 5'; Jones 57'; Gordon 64'; Con: O'Shea (2/3) 7' 65'; Cards: Horton (YC) 37'	Attendance: 1,500; Referee: Graham Cooper (Australia)

^{FS} 12 October	Sydney	33–57	Western Force	Woollahra Oval, Sydney
12.00pm AEDT	Try: Reilly 14'; Penalty try 53'; Harrison 64' m McCauley 72'; Con: Harrison (2/3) 15' 73'	Summary	Try: Fou (2) 22' 43'; Ralston (2) 38' 48' m Deegan 5', Lloyd 24'; Kaitu'u 57' m, Tizzano 67'; Miller 75' m Con: Deegan (5/6) 6' 23' 26' 44' 49'; Strachan (1/3) 68'; Cards: Placid (YC) 32'; Meo (YC) 72'	Attendance: 750; Referee: Dru Tonks (Australia)

12 October	Fijian Drua	26–24	Queensland Country	Lawaqa Park, Sigatoka
3.00pm FJT	Try: Dyer 23'; Kurumudu 31'; Waqatabu 39'; Wainiqolo 80' m Con: Malele (3/4) 24' 32' 40'; Cards: Viriviri (YC) 79'	Summary	Try: Wilson 9'; Fittock 13'; Penalty try 66'; Con: Saifoloi (2/2) 11' 14'; Pen: Saifoloi (1/2) 35'; Cards: Felemi (YC) 25'; Hockings (YC) 29'	Attendance: 2,500; Referee: James Quinn (Australia)

12 October	Brisbane City	24–21	Melbourne Rising	Easts Rugby Club, Brisbane
3.00pm AEST	Try: Tela 10' m Paenga-Amosa 15' m Lucas 33', Wallis 38'; Con: Hegarty (2/4) 34' 39'; Cards: Van Nek (YC) 40+2'; Naivalu (YC) 75'; Hegarty (YC) 78'	Summary	Try: Penalty try 40+2'; Leota 53'; Haisila 78'; Con: So'oialo (2/2) 54' 78'	Attendance: 2,250; Referee: Jordan Way (Australia)

== Title playoffs ==
Semi-finals
Western Force	42
Brisbane City	38
Canberra Vikings	28
Fijian Drua	27

Final
Western Force	41
Canberra Vikings	3

=== Semi-finals ===
^{FS} 19 October	Western Force	42–38	Brisbane City	UWA Rugby Park, Perth
12.00pm AWST	Try: Fines (2) 44' 54'; Fou (2) 49' 58'; Placid 8'; Deegan 39'; Con: Deegan (6/6) 9' 40' 45' 50' 55' 59'; Cards: Thrush (YC) 22'	Summary	Try: Ngauamo (2) 68' 76'; Uru 13'; Paenga-Amosa 22'; Henry 79'; Con: Hegarty (5/5) 14' 24' 68' 77' 79'; Pen: Hegarty (1/1) 49'	Attendance: 3,500; Referee: Damon Murphy (Australia)

^{FS} 20 October	Canberra Vikings	28–27	Fijian Drua	Viking Park, Canberra
3.00pm AEDT	Try: Wright (2) 42' 51'; Allen 47'; Banks 80+1'; Con: Lonergan (4/4) 43' 48' 52' 80+3'	Summary	Try: Naulago 12'; Vularika 30' m Ikanivere 37'; Navuma 63'; Con: Malele (2/4) 12' 38'; Pen: Malele (1/1) 3'	Attendance: 3,000; Referee: Graham Cooper (Australia)

=== Final ===
^{FS} 26 October	Western Force	41–3	Canberra Vikings	UWA Rugby Park, Perth
12.00pm AWST	Try: Lee-Warner (2) 30' c, 40' m Jooste 45' c Tessmann 58' c Thrush 67' m Placid 71' c Con: Deegan (4/6) 31', 46', 58', 72'; Pen: Deegan (1/1) 49'	Summary	Pen: Lonergan (1/1) 16'	Attendance: 6,500; Referee: Damon Murphy (Australia)

Western Force	Canberra Vikings

Team details

FB	15	Jack McGregor
RW	14	Byron Ralston
OC	13	Pama Fou	(substituted off) 60'
IC	12	Nick Jooste	(substituted off) 72'
LW	11	Jonah Placid
FH	10	Andrew Deegan (c)
SH	9	Issak Fines	(substituted off) 72'
N8	8	Brynard Stander
OF	7	Carlo Tizzano
BF	6	Henry Stowers	(substituted off) 58'
RL	5	Jeremy Thrush
LL	4	Fergus Lee-Warner	(substituted off) 72'
TP	3	Tom Sheminant	(substituted off) 68'
HK	2	Heath Tessmann	(substituted off) 58'
LP	1	Harrison Lloyd	(substituted off) 54'
Replacements:
HK	16	Andrew Ready	(substituted in) 58'
PR	17	Cameron Orr	(substituted in) 54'
PR	18	Dominic Hardman	(substituted in) 68'
LK	19	Ben Grant	(substituted in) 72'
FL	20	Tevin Ferris	(substituted in) 58'
SH	21	Rory O'Sullivan	(substituted in) 72'
FH	22	Chris Tuatara-Morrison	(substituted in) 72'
UB	23	Jake Strachan	(substituted in) 60'
Coach:
Tim Sampson

FB	15	Tom Banks	(substituted off) 72'
RW	14	Tom Wright
OC	13	Len Ikitau
IC	12	Irae Simone
LW	11	Andy Muirhead
FH	10	Noah Lolesio	(substituted off) 68'
SH	9	Ryan Lonergan	(substituted off) 54'
N8	8	Angus Allen	(substituted off) 61'
OF	7	Will Miller
BF	6	Pete Samu
RL	5	Nick Frost
LL	4	Blake Enever (c)	(substituted off) 49'
TP	3	Angus Wagner	(substituted off) 58'
HK	2	Lachlan Lonergan	(substituted off) 68'
LP	1	Bo Abra	(substituted off) 49'
Replacements:
HK	16	TP Luteru	(substituted in) 68'
PR	17	Fred Kaihea	(substituted in) 49'
PR	18	Tom Ross	(substituted in) 58'
LK	19	Will Sankey	(substituted in) 49'
FL	20	Luke Gersekowski	(substituted in) 61'
SH	21	Joe Powell	(substituted in) 54'
FH	22	Bayley Kuenzle	(substituted in) 68'
OB	23	Lincoln Smith	(substituted in) 72'
Coach:
Nick Scrivener

Man of the Match (Phil Waugh Medal):
Fergus Lee-Warner

Assistant Referees:
Graham Cooper (Australia)
Jordan Way (Australia)
Television match official:
Alexander Ninkov (Australia)

== Season attendances ==
Team	Matches hosted	Total	Average	Highest	Lowest
Brisbane City	4	9,450	2,363	3,000	1,500
Canberra Vikings	5	8,100	1,620	3,000	1,000
Fijian Drua	3	6,750	2,250	2,750	1,500
Melbourne Rising	4	5,250	1,313	2,000	500
NSW Country Eagles	3	3,750	1,250	1,500	1,000
Queensland Country	3	5,000	1,667	2,000	1,500
Sydney	3	2,000	667	750	500
Western Force	6	19,000	3,167	6,500	1,500
Totals (8 teams)	31	57,800	1,865	6,500	500

== NRC Division 2 ==
The NRC II tournament was hosted by Rugby Union South Australia on 26–29 September in Adelaide as a competition for member unions and regions in Rugby Australia without a pathway to professional rugby via the main National Rugby Championship. The tournament was a reprisal of sorts of the Australian Rugby Shield which had been disbanded ten years earlier, and most of the representative teams which had featured in the Shield were invited to participate in NRC Division 2 in 2019. The eight teams scheduled to play in the tournament were:

- Northern Territory Mosquitoes ^{^{W/D}}
- (New South Wales) NSW Country Cockatoos
- (Western Australia) Perth Gold
- Queensland Country Heelers
- South Australia Black Falcons
- South Australia U23
- Tasmania Jack Jumpers
- (Victoria (state)) Victoria Country Barbarians

=== Third place ===
29 September	Queensland Country Heelers	31–5	South Australia Black Falcons	Woodville, South Australia

=== Div 2 final ===
29 September	Perth Gold	15–5	NSW Country Cockatoos	Woodville, South Australia

== Notes ==
^^{FS} Fox Sports broadcast match.

^^{W/D} The Northern Territory Mosquitoes team was a late withdrawal from the NRC II for 2019 and did not compete in the tournament.
