= 1983 Hawthorn Football Club season =

59th season in the Victorian Football League

Hawthorn Football Club
1983 season
- President: Ron Cook
- Coach: Allan Jeans
- Captain: Leigh Matthews
- Home ground: Princes Park
- VFL season: 15–7 (2nd)
- Finals series: Premiers (Defeated Essendon 140–57)
- Best and Fairest: Terry Wallace
- Leading goalkicker: Leigh Matthews (79)
- Highest home attendance: 110,332 (Grand Final vs. Essendon)
- Lowest home attendance: 8,188 (Round 14 vs. St Kilda
- Average home attendance: 30,850

The 1983 season was the Hawthorn Football Club's 59th season in the Victorian Football League and 82nd overall. Hawthorn qualified for finals for the second consecutive season. Hawthorn qualified for their seventh Grand Final and their first since 1978. Hawthorn won their fifth premiership defeating Essendon 140–57 in the Grand Final. This was their first premiership since 1978.

== Fixture ==
=== Premiership season ===
Rd	Date and local time	Opponent	Scores (Hawthorn's scores indicated in bold)			Venue	Attendance	Record
Rd	Date and local time	Opponent	Home	Away	Result	Venue	Attendance	Record
1	Saturday, 26 March (2:10 pm)	Fitzroy	16.16 (112)	**20.11 (131)**	Won by 19 points	Junction Oval (A)	15,626	1–0
2	Monday, 4 April (2:10 pm)	Sydney	**9.16 (70)**	5.15 (45)	Won by 25 points	Princes Park (H)	16,295	2–0
3	Saturday, 9 April (2:10 pm)	St Kilda	6.6 (42)	**26.15 (171)**	Won by 129 points	Moorabbin Oval (A)	19,227	3–0
4	Saturday, 16 April (2:10 pm)	Footscray	12.25 (97)	**17.16 (118)**	Lost by 21 points	Princes Park (A)	16,504	3–1
5	Saturday, 24 April (2:10 pm)	Collingwood	9.19 (73)	**14.11 (95)**	Won by 22 points	Victoria Park (A)	28,506	4–1
6	Saturday, 30 April (2:10 pm)	Richmond	**12.16 (88)**	15.16 (106)	Lost by 18 points	VFL Park (H)	33,096	4–2
7	Saturday, 7 May (2:10 pm)	North Melbourne	**13.13 (91)**	21.16 (142)	Lost by 51 points	Princes Park (H)	13,958	4–3
8	Saturday, 14 May (2:10 pm)	Essendon	**20.17 (137)**	14.11 (95)	Won by 42 points	Princes Park (H)	21,835	5–3
9	Saturday, 21 May (2:10 pm)	Carlton	15.14 (104)	**14.12 (96)**	Lost by 8 points	Princes Park (A)	30,660	5–4
10	Saturday, 28 May (2:10 pm)	Melbourne	16.13 (109)	**27.9 (171)**	Won by 62 points	VFL Park (A)	23,989	6–4
11	Saturday, 4 June (2:10 pm)	Geelong	**12.16 (88)**	14.11 (95)	Lost by 7 points	Princes Park (H)	13,482	6–5
12	Saturday, 11 June (2:10 pm)	Fitzroy	**25.17 (167)**	21.8 (134)	Won by 33 points	Princes Park (H)	20,708	7–5
13	Sunday, 19 June (2:10 pm)	Sydney	11.12 (78)	**15.20 (110)**	Won by 32 points	Sydney Cricket Ground (A)	10,084	8–5
14	Saturday, 25 June (2:10 pm)	St Kilda	**21.17 (143)**	9.20 (74)	Won by 69 points	Princes Park (H)	8,188	9–5
15	Saturday, 2 July (2:10 pm)	Footscray	9.6 (60)	**13.11 (89)**	Won by 29 points	VFL Park (A)	15,750	10–5
16	Saturday, 16 July (2:10 pm)	Collingwood	**19.23 (137)**	14.16 (100)	Won by 37 points	Princes Park (H)	28,484	11–5
17	Saturday, 23 July (2:10 pm)	Richmond	11.16 (82)	**22.14 (146)**	Won by 64 points	Melbourne Cricket Ground (A)	31,084	12–5
18	Saturday, 30 July (2:10 pm)	North Melbourne	12.18 (90)	**15.7 (97)**	Won by 7 points	Arden Street Oval (A)	17,720	13–5
19	Saturday, 6 August (2:10 pm)	Essendon	23.18 (156)	**16.14 (110)**	Lost by 46 points	Windy Hill (A)	19,237	13–6
20	Saturday, 13 August (2:10 pm)	Carlton	**15.22 (112)**	20.9 (129)	Lost by 17 points	Princes Park (H)	28,476	13–7
21	Saturday, 20 August (2:10 pm)	Melbourne	**25.22 (172)**	8.9 (57)	Won by 115 points	VFL Park (H)	21,192	14–7
22	Saturday, 27 August (2:10 pm)	Geelong	11.11 (77)	**24.13 (157)**	Won by 80 points	Kardinia Park (A)	12,245	15–7

=== Finals series ===
Rd	Date and local time	Opponent	Scores (Hawthorn's scores indicated in bold)			Venue	Attendance
Rd	Date and local time	Opponent	Home	Away	Result	Venue	Attendance
Qualifying Final	Saturday, 3 September (2:30 pm)	Fitzroy	**19.13 (127)**	19.9 (123)	Won by 4 points	Melbourne Cricket Ground (H)	58,288
Second Semi-Final	Saturday, 10 September (2:10 pm)	North Melbourne	**13.10 (88)**	6.12 (48)	Won by 40 points	VFL Park (H)	41,063
Grand Final	Saturday, 24 September (2:50 pm)	Essendon	**20.20 (140)**	8.9 (57)	Won by 83 points	Melbourne Cricket Ground (H)	110,332

== Ladder ==
(P)	Premiers
	Qualified for finals

#	Team	P	W	L	D	PF	PA	%	Pts
1	North Melbourne	22	16	6	0	2789	2183	127.8	64
2	Hawthorn (P)	22	15	7	0	2675	2078	128.7	60
3	Fitzroy	22	15	7	0	2608	2059	126.7	60
4	Essendon	22	15	7	0	2664	2215	120.3	60
5	Carlton	22	13	9	0	2360	2244	105.2	52
6	Collingwood	22	12	10	0	2315	2247	103.0	48
7	Footscray	22	10	12	0	2102	2428	86.6	40
8	Melbourne	22	9	13	0	2220	2557	86.8	36
9	Geelong	22	8	14	0	1932	2197	87.9	32
10	Richmond	22	7	15	0	2124	2392	88.8	28
11	Sydney	22	7	15	0	2068	2670	77.5	28
12	St Kilda	22	5	17	0	2150	2737	78.6	20

Rules for classification: 1. premiership points; 2. percentage; 3. points for
Average score: 106.1
Source: AFL Tables
