= Fijian Latui =

- Union: Fiji Rugby Union
- Founded: 2019; 7 years ago
- Grounds: ANZ Stadium; Cakobau Park; Churchill Park
- Coach: Senirusi Seruvakula
- League: Global Rapid Rugby

Union website
- www.fijirugby.com

The Fijian Latui was a professional rugby union team based in Suva that plays in the Global Rapid Rugby competition.

Officially launched in March 2019, the Latui played four Pacific Showcase matches during May and June 2019, before joining the inaugural Global Rapid Rugby tournament in 2020.

It was originally expected that the team would compete in 2019 for Rapid Rugby's A$1 million first prize, but the tournament launch was postponed for a year due to the shortened time frame following World Rugby approval in November 2018. The Showcase Series was arranged for 2019 instead.

== Name ==
Latui, in Fijian, refers to the Fiji goshawk, a small hawk found in that country. The Latui can hunt its prey with either a stealthy glide or a rapid flapping attack.

== Squad ==
The Latui team was drawn mainly from players based locally in Fiji. The squad for the 2020 season is:

Fijian Latui – 2020 Global Rapid Rugby
Hooker: (Fiji) Tevita Ikanivere; (Fiji) **Ratunaisa Navuma**; (Fiji) Manoa Mocelutu; Prop: (Fiji) Livai Natave; (Fiji) **Joeli Veitayaki Jr.**; (Fiji) Penijamini Makutu; (Fiji) Jone Koroi; (Fiji) Mateo Qolisese; (Fiji) Timoci Sauvoli; Lock: (Fiji) Sailasa Kerekere; (Fiji) Soro Tuifagalele; (Fiji) Peni Naruma (Note: Naruma, Naimasi, Tela, Tikoirotuma , Raiyala and Malele (Rd 1).); (Fiji) Chris Minimbi; (Fiji) Epeli Radaniva; Backrow: (Fiji) Elia Canakaivata; (Fiji) **Eremasi Radrodro**; (Fiji) Filimoni Seru; (Fiji) Kelepi Naimasi; (Fiji) Raikabula Momoedonu	Scrum-half: (Fiji) Simione Kuruvoli; (Fiji) Aminiasi Natoga; (Fiji) Leone Nawai; Fly-half: (Fiji) Jone Manu; (Fiji) **Caleb Muntz**; (Fiji) **Teti Tela**; Centre: (Fiji) **Cyril Reece**; (Fiji) **Asaeli Tikoirotuma**; (Fiji) **John Stewart**; (Fiji) Apisalome Vota; (Fiji) **Seru Vularika** (c); Wing: (Fiji) Epeli Momo; (Fiji) Lepani Raiyala; (Fiji) Nacanieli Narequva; (Fiji) Jiuta Wainiqolo; Fullback: (Fiji) Meli Nakarawa; (Fiji) Osea Waqa; (Fiji) **Enele Malele**
Notes: The initial 33-man squad was named in February 2020. Players joining in subsequent rounds were:
**Bold** denotes player is internationally capped. (c) Denotes team captain. ^{1} denotes marquee player.

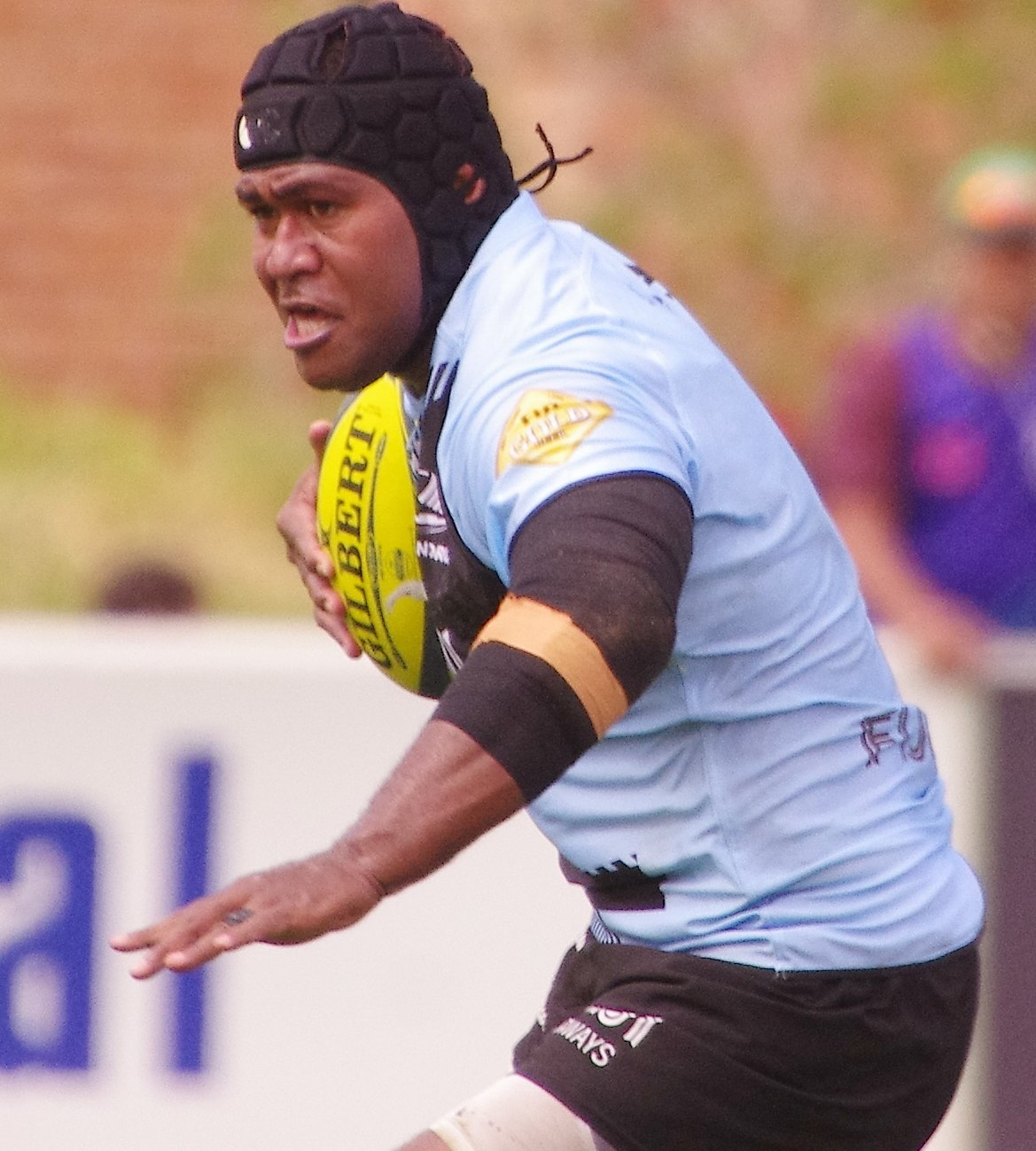
Prop Joeli Veitayaki Jnr

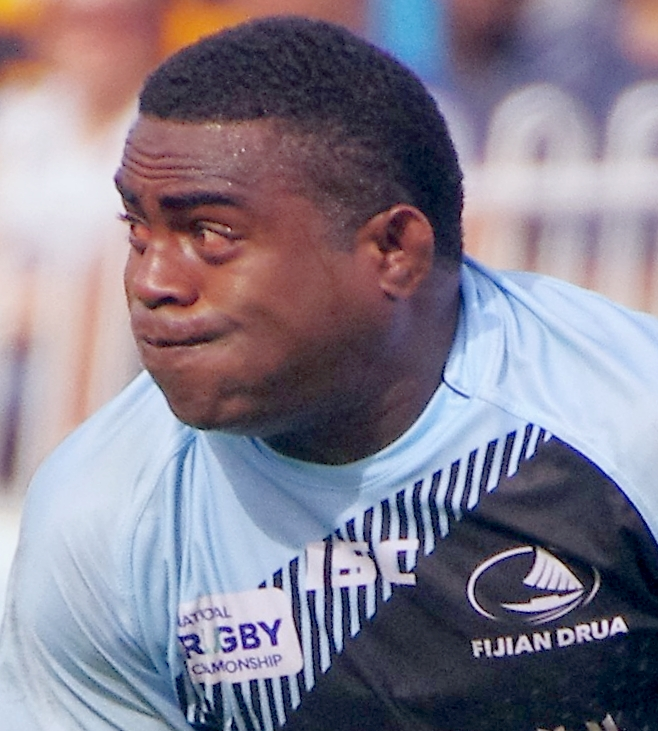
Hooker Ratunaisa Navuma

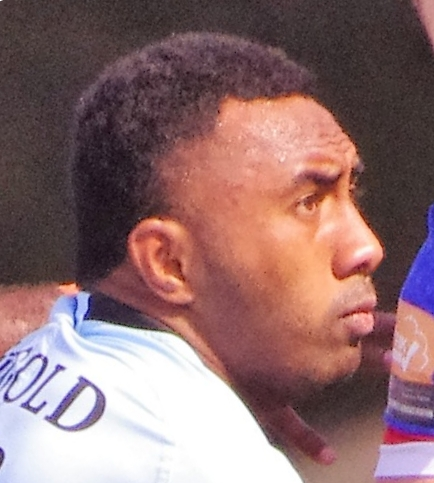
Five-eighth Seru Vularika

== Records ==
=== Season standings ===
Global Rapid Rugby

Year	Pos	Pld	W	D	L	PF	PA	+/−	BP	Pts	Play-offs
2019 ^{*}	2nd	4	2	0	2	114	135	−21	2	10	—N/a

Notes:

^* 2019 Rapid Rugby matches in the Pacific showcase.

=== Head coaches ===
- Senirusi Seruvakula (2019–present)

=== Captains ===
- Mosese Voka (2019)
- Seru Vularika (2020)

== See also ==
- Rugby union in Fiji
