= Australian Rugby Shield =

- Sport: Rugby Union football
- Inaugural season: 2000
- Number of teams: 8
- Country: Australia
- Holders: ACT/Southern New South Wales Griffins (2022)
- Most titles: NSW Country Cockatoos (4 titles)
- Broadcast partner: ABC (former)
- Related competition: (Victoria (state)) Dewar Shield; (Australian Capital Territory) John I Dent Cup; Queensland Premier Rugby; (Western Australia) RugbyWA Premier Grade; (New South Wales) Shute Shield; (South Australia) SARU Premier Grade; (Tasmania) Tasmanian Rugby Union; Northern Territory Rugby Union

The Australian Rugby Shield is a rugby union competition in Australia. It was launched in 2000 by the Australian Rugby Union (ARU), now Rugby Australia (RA). The competition was intended to unearth new talent outside of the existing rugby strongholds of Sydney and Brisbane. The competition was suspended after the 2008 season, but has since been revived.

The tournament was an important step in the development of rugby union in Australia, and provided an opportunity for Rugby Australia to identify and unearth talented players nationally. It provided regional teams and developing unions with a regular schedule to compete against each other at a higher level than would normally be possible within their individual states or territories.

Conducted under rules and regulations similar to the Super Rugby, the competition aimed to assist players, coaches, managers and referees in their professional development. It provided a pathway to full representative level including education in coaching, selecting and refereeing.

== History ==
The Australian Rugby Shield was first contested in 2000, with six teams playing a single round robin over five weekends and the top two teams playing in the final. The teams in the inaugural season were the Adelaide Black Falcons, Darwin Mosquitoes, Melbourne Axemen, New South Wales Country Cockatoos, Perth Gold, and Queensland Country Heelers. The New South Wales and Queensland Country teams met in the final, played as the curtain-raiser to the Bledisloe Cup match held at Stadium Australia in front of a record rugby crowd of 109,874. Queensland Country won in an upset, 23-17.

New South Wales Country went on to win the next two titles, before Perth claimed their first Australian Rugby Shield in 2003. A first-past-the-post system was put in place in 2004, eliminating the requirement for a final. In 2006, two additional teams were added, the Tasmania Jack Jumpers and the ACT & Southern NSW Vikings team that won the Australian Rugby Shield on their first attempt. The competition was split into two pools in a three-week round robin competition with the winners and runners up in each pool progressing to the semi-finals (27 May 2006) and cross-pool Final (3 June 2006). Contracted Super Rugby and academy players were excluded.

In 2007, the tournament reverted to a 6-team home-and-away round-robin tournament, without Perth and the Vikings. These two teams were excluded as the ARU determined that the local competitions were sufficient to foster talent for the new Australian Rugby Championship teams, the Perth Spirit and Canberra Vikings, respectively.

At the end of 2008, and citing the difficult economic environment, the ARU declared that the 2009 Australian Rugby Shield would be suspended. The involvement of the Australia A team in the Pacific Nations Cup was also cancelled.

=== NRC Division 2 (2018−2020) ===
An Emerging States Championship was formed in 2018 for representative teams from smaller rugby unions within Australia. There had been no regular competition for these teams since the demise of Australian Rugby Shield a decade earlier. The new tournament was hosted by Rugby Union South Australia in Adelaide and featured the South Australia Black Falcons, Victoria Country Barbarians, Northern Territory Mosquitoes and Tasmania Jack Jumpers. The Black Falcons were the inaugural winners. The tournament was rebranded as NRC Division 2 for 2019, with eight representative teams invited:

- New South Wales Country Cockatoos
- Northern Territory Mosquitoes
- (Western Australia) Perth Gold
- Queensland Country Heelers
- South Australia Black Falcons
- (South Australia) South Australian U23
- Tasmania Jack Jumpers
- (Victoria (state)) Victoria Country Barbarians

Year	Teams	Champion	Runner-up	Third	Fourth
2018	4	South Australia	Tasmania	Northern Territory	(Victoria (state)) Victoria Country
2019	7	(Western Australia) Perth Gold	New South Wales Country	Queensland Country	South Australia
2020	Cancelled due to COVID-19 pandemic				

=== Revival of the Competition ===
During the coronavirus pandemic, Rugby Australia suffered severe economic hardship, nearing bankruptcy. These financial issues were quickly turned around by a new board and led to the reintroduction of the Australian Rugby Shield and Australia ‘A’ competitions from the 2022 season.

Held in Adelaide, teams participated from ACT & Southern New South Wales, New South Wales Country, Outback Queensland, Queensland Country, Rugby Tasmania, Rugby Victoria & Rugby Western Australia.

The ACT and Southern New South Wales Griffins were crowned champions defeating NSW Country 34–31 in the Grand Final at Brighton Oval, Adelaide.

The 2022 Australian Rugby Shield also had a women's competition, with Victoria defeating all who stood before them.

Following the conclusion of the 2022 edition, Rugby Australia came under scrutiny for not promoting the competition enough, resulting a lack of awareness in the rugby community it was taking place. Critics did praise the return of the competition as a whole, calling it a significant step in growing rugby union in regional areas.

== 2025 tournament ==
The 2025 Australian Rugby Shield was held from 25–28 September at Newcastle Regional No. 2 Sportsground in Newcastle, New South Wales. Fourteen representative teams from seven Australian states and territories competed, comprising eight men's teams and six women's teams.

The men's competition was divided into two pools of four teams, with each team playing the others in its pool once. The pool winners advanced to the Shield Final, while the remaining teams contested classification matches against the corresponding-ranked team from the opposite pool.

Pool A consisted of the NSW Country Cockatoos, Hunter Wildfires Development, Tasmania Jack Jumpers, and Queensland Suburban.

Pool B featured the defending champions Queensland Country Heelers, NSW Subbies, Australian Defence Rugby Union, and South Australia Black Falcons.

The women's competition featured a single pool, with each team playing three matches before the top two teams advanced to the Shield Final.

In the men's Grand Final on 5 October 2025, the Queensland Country Heelers defeated the NSW Country Cockatoos 39–31 to win their third Australian Rugby Shield title. NSW Subbies defeated Hunter Wildfires Development 55–33 to finish third, the Australian Defence Rugby Union defeated Tasmania Jack Jumpers 29–5 to claim fifth place, and South Australia Black Falcons defeated Queensland Suburban 42–5 to finish seventh.

The women's Shield Final was contested between ACT & SNSW Kestrels and Sydney Women after both teams finished the pool stage undefeated. Sydney Women defeated the Kestrels 19–17 in the final to claim their first Australian Rugby Shield women's title. Queensland Country Orchids defeated South Australia Black Falcons 24–12 to finish third, while NSW Country Corellas defeated Queensland Suburban Kelpies 39–3 to claim fifth place.

=== Men's pool standings ===
Pool A
Pos	Team	P	W	D	L	+/−	BP	Pts
1	NSW Country Cockatoos	3	3	0	0	87	2	14
2	Hunter Wildfires Development	3	2	0	1	45	1	9
3	Tasmania Jack Jumpers	3	1	0	2	−87	1	5
4	Queensland Suburban	3	0	0	3	−45	1	1

Pool B
Pos	Team	P	W	D	L	+/−	BP	Pts
1	Queensland Country Heelers	3	2	0	1	90	4	12
2	NSW Subbies	3	2	0	1	11	3	11
3	Australian Defence Rugby Union	3	2	0	1	−37	1	9
4	South Australia Black Falcons	3	0	0	3	−64	1	1

=== Women's standings ===
Pos	Team	P	W	D	L	+/−	BP	Pts
1	ACT & SNSW Kestrels	3	3	0	0	83	3	15
2	Sydney Women	3	3	0	0	48	1	13
3	Queensland Country Orchids	3	2	0	1	18	2	10
4	South Australia Black Falcons	3	1	0	2	−64	0	4
5	Queensland Suburban Kelpies	3	0	0	3	−51	1	1
6	NSW Country Corellas	3	0	0	3	−34	0	0

== Television coverage ==
From 2000 to 2008, the competition was broadcast on national television by the digital channel ABC2. It showcased two of the Australian Rugby Shield matches each round.

In 2022, games were only available to watch via YouTube. This contributed to the criticism that Rugby Australia received in relation to the lack of the promotion this tournament received.

== Participating teams ==
- (South Australia) South Australian Black Falcons
- (Australian Capital Territory) ACT & Southern New South Wales Griffins
- (Victoria (state)) Victorian Axemen
- New South Wales Country Cockatoos
- (Western Australia) Perth Gold
- Queensland Country Heelers
- Tasmania Jack Jumpers
- Northern Territory Mosquitos

== Men's Champions ==
- 2000 Queensland Country Heelers
- 2001 New South Wales Country Cockatoos
- 2002 New South Wales Country Cockatoos
- 2003 Perth Gold
- 2004 New South Wales Country Cockatoos
- 2005 Perth Gold
- 2006 ACT & Southern New South Wales Griffins
- 2007 Victorian Axemen
- 2008 New South Wales Country Cockatoos
- 2009–2021 Not played
- 2022 ACT & Southern New South Wales Griffins
- 2023 ACT & Southern New South Wales Griffins
- 2024 Queensland Country Heelers
- 2025 Queensland Country Heelers

== Women's Champions ==
- 2022 Victoria Women
- 2023 NSW Country Corellas
- 2024 ACT & SNSW Kestrels
- 2025 Sydney Women

== See also ==
- Australian Provincial Championship (defunct)
- Australian Rugby Championship (defunct)
- National Rugby Championship
- Super Rugby
