= Isaac Lucas =

Isaac Lucas may refer to:

- Isaac Benson Lucas (1867–1940), Attorney General of Ontario, Canada
- Isaac Lucas (rugby union) (born 1999), Australian rugby union player for the Queensland Reds
