= Enele =

Enele is a given name. Notable people with the name include:

- Enele Maʻafu (c. 1816–1881), Tongan chief
- Enele Malele (born 1990), Fijian rugby union player
- Enele Sopoaga (born 1956), Tuvaluan diplomat and politician
- Enele Taufa (born 1984), Tongan rugby union player

== See also ==
- Daniel Enele Kwanairara (1947–2012), Solomon Islands politician
