= Mick Byrne (Australian footballer and rugby union coach) =

Australian rules footballer

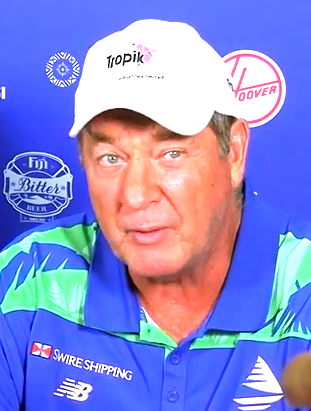
- Born: Michael Byrne; 2 December 1958 (age 67)
- Height: 200 cm (6 ft 7 in)
- School: St Paul's College, Manly

Rugby union career
Coaching career
- Years: Team
- 2002–2005: Scotland (Skills coach)
- 2004–2005: Saracens (Skills coach)
- 2004–2005: New Zealand (Skills coach)
- 2009–2011: Japan (Assist. Coach)
- 2012–2014: Auckland Blues (Assist. Coach)
- 2016–2019: Australia (Assist. Coach)
- 2020: Austin Gilgronis (Director of Rugby)
- 2021: Canada women's sevens (Interim Head Coach)
- 2021–2024: Fijian Drua (Head Coach)
- 2024–2026: Fiji (Head Coach)
Australian rules football career
Personal information
- Original team: North Shore (Sydney)
- Height: 200 cm (6 ft 7 in)
- Weight: 86 kg (190 lb)
- Position: Ruckman
Playing career^{1}
Years	Club	Games (Goals)
1977–1982	Melbourne	56 (41)
1982–1986	Hawthorn	90 (97)
1987–1989	Sydney Swans	21 (12)
Total		167 (150)
Representative team honours
Years	Team	Games (Goals)
1988	New South Wales	
Coaching career
Years	Club	Games (W–L–D)
1991–1993	Sydney (Assistant Coach)	
1994–1997	North Shore	
1998–2001	NSW-ES Bulldogs	
1998–2001	NSW State of Origin	
- ^{1} Playing statistics correct to the end of 1989.
Career highlights
- Hawthorn premiership player, 1983; 5th in Brownlow Medal, 1983

Michael Byrne (born 2 December 1958), nicknamed Mick the Kick, is an Australian former Australian rules footballer and now rugby union coach, who specialises in kicking and team skills. As a youngster, Byrne developed as a ruckman playing for the North Shore Football Club in Sydney.He was later recruited by the Melbourne Demons. Byrne played with Melbourne, Hawthorn and Sydney in the Victorian Football League (VFL) from 1977 to 1989, before turning to coaching in the early 1990s. After a career in AFL spanning almost thirty years, Byrne became a rugby union coach. His most recent appointment was head coach of the Fiji national team from 2024 to 2026.

== AFL career ==
A 200 cm tall ruckman, Byrne started his career at Melbourne in 1977 and one game into his sixth season with the club decided to cross to Hawthorn. Byrne kicked 8 goals straight in his debut game for the Hawks against Footscray in 1982. He finished the year with 47 goals. In 1983, Byrne finished equal fifth in the Brownlow Medal and was a member of Hawthorn's premiership side, kicking three goals in the Grand Final.

He holds the Hawthorn record for the most behinds in a VFL/AFL game without a goal, after kicking 0.8 in a game against Melbourne in 1985. In the history of the league, only Stuart Spencer and Tom Allen are known to have kicked more behinds without a goal (11).

Byrne moved to Sydney in 1987, playing 21 games for the Swans before his retirement at the end of the 1989 VFL season. In all Byrne played 167 league games and kicked 150 goals.

After resting, Byrne turned to coaching, first in an assistant role for the Swans (the club he last played for), before stepping up as head coach for North Shore in 1994. In 1998 he became head coach of University side Bulldogs in New South Wales where he remained until 2001 before a change of codes saw Byre become more active in rugby union.

== Rugby union coaching ==
=== Early years ===
Byrne's career in rugby union first began in 1998, where while still coaching AFL, when he joined the Brumbies as a part-time consultant, which later led to Byrne joining the Wallabies as a kicking coaching in the build up to the World Cup winning campaign in 1999.

In 2001, he left Australia where he took up various consultancy stints; firstly South Africa in 2001, before heading to Europe in 2002 to take on a skills based role with the Scottish national team between 2002 and 2005. During that he also worked alongside Matt Williams at Leinster Rugby Club on a part-time basis throughout the 2002–03 season. In 2003, Byrne, as well as Williams, left Leinster to focus solely Scotland

His consultancy also took Byrne to England, where for a season, he consulted for Rod Kafer at Saracens until Kafer left his post halfway through the 2004/2005 season.

==== New Zealand, Australia ====
In May 2005, Byrne left Scotland following an appointment to become skills and kicking coach at New Zealand, which saw him in the role for over a decade.

During his tenure as at New Zealand, Byrne won two Rugby World Cups (2011, 2015), eight Tri Nations / Rugby Championship trophies (2005, 2006, 2007, 2008, 2010, 2012, 2013, 2014) and a British and Irish Lions tour (2005).

Alongside his duties in New Zealand, Byrne also worked along Japan to help develop the emerging rugby nations, helping them to 2011 Rugby World Cup qualification, 3 consecutive Asian Cup titles (2009–2011), and their first ever Pacific Nations Cup title in 2011.

After winning the World Cup in 2011 with the All Blacks, Byrne became involved with Auckland-based Super Rugby team the Blues while simultaneously remaining inside the All Blacks coaching team, and occasionally consulted with the Canadian women's sevens team between 2013 and 2016.

When Byrne left New Zealand in December 2015 after winning the 2015 Rugby World Cup, the team had accrued a win percentage above eighty-seven percent and is often praised as having deep involvement in building the "All Blacks Empire".

Several months after leaving New Zealand with a desire to be closer to his family in Brisbane, Byrne was hired as a skills coach for the Wallabies in July 2016 on a four-year contract, working alongside coach Michael Cheika.

Unfortunately, during his four years with the Wallabies, the team failed to win a single major trophy, however, did win the Mandela Challenge Plate (2016, 2017, 2018), the Puma Trophy (2016, 2017, 2018, 2019), the James Bevan Trophy (2016, 2017), the Hopetoun Cup (2016) and the Trophée des Bicentenaires (2016).

Byrne was with the Wallabies from July 2016 to March 2020.

Record of national team during tenure as Skills Coach
Team	Span	Played	Won	Drawn	Lost	Win %
New Zealand	May 2005 – December 2015, 10 years, 7 months	146	128	2	16	87.67%
Australia	July 2016 – March 2020, 3 years, 8 months	49	23	2	24	46.94%

=== Post Australia and New Zealand ===
Following the 2019 Rugby World Cup and Byrnes departure from the Wallabies set-up, Byrne took up a post with newly formed Major League Rugby side Austin Gilgronis in the USA. However, his stint as Director of Rugby was cut short, due to the COVID-19 pandemic.

In February 2021, Byrne was named interim head coach of the Canadian Women's 7s team, which would see him take the side to the delayed 2020 Summer Olympics, where his side only managed to earn one victory and failed to pass into the medal stage of the tournament.

==== Fiji ====
On 24 September 2021, Byrne was announced as the head coach of the Fijian Drua ahead there inaugural season in the Super Rugby. It is the first role Byrne has had as a head coach of a major professional team in rugby union.

In his first season in charge, the Drua only managed to win two games, coming against fellow Pacific team Moana Pasifika and Australian side Melbourne Rebels. However, by the second season in charge in 2023, Byrne managed to turn the team around to be more consistent, making the play-off for the first time with six victories; including a win over the defending, and later defended, champions Crusaders.

After a successful 2023 Rugby World Cup campaign for the Fijian national side, hype grew for the Drua in the Super Rugby, where for a second season in a row, the Drua progressed to the play-offs, only to fall in the quarter-finals again like in 2023.

Byrne's success saw his name be considered for the vacant Flying Fijian head coaching role, and in April 2024, Byrne was confirmed as head coach of Fiji.

His first match in charge was an uncapped match against the Barbarians at Twickenham, losing 45–32. However, in his first test match, an away match against Georgia, Byrne led the side to a 21–12 victory, before later going on to lose to New Zealand in an touring match in USA, 47–5.

Later that year, Fiji topped their group in the Pacific Nations Cup, before going onto the defeat the United States in the semi-finals (22–3) and later Japan (41–17) to win their first Pacific Nations Cup title since 2018.

Byrne also led Fiji to an historic first away victory over Wales (24–19) in Cardiff during their 2024 November tour.

In 2025, Fiji came within minutes of securing an away victory over Australia, before conceding in the last play of the game to loose 21–18. Byrne did however lead Fiji to a 29–14 win over Scotland a week later, before later going on to retain their PNC title.

In April 2026, it was announced that Byrne and the Fiji Rugby Union (FRU) had mutually agreed to part ways. Earlier in the year, it was reported that Byrne been unwell and told RNZ Pacific the FRU was reviewing his condition. In June 2026, Byrne told Nine.com.au that he was disappointed that health issues were rumoured as the reason for his departure from the Fiji coaching role, and stated that he was not released by the FRU because of any health issues, for which a medical report seen by Nine.com.au cleared him of "performing professional duties". Byrne said the reason he was removed from the role was so that "Fiji Rugby could move in a new direction."

Veteran rugby commentator and friend of Byrne, Greg Clark, said in July 2026 that Byrne was removed from coaching Fiji by the FRU to make way for a local coach.

Sporting positions
Preceded by Simon Raiwalui	Fiji National Rugby Union Coach; 2024–2026	Succeeded by (Fiji) Senirusi Seruvakula (interim)
