= Stephen Copping =

Australian rules footballer

Personal information
- Born: 3 August 1956 (age 70)
- Original team: Glenelg (SANFL)
- Draft: No. 20, 1981 interstate draft
- Debut: Round 1, 1982, Essendon vs. Footscray, at Windy Hill
- Height: 180 cm (5 ft 11 in)
- Weight: 80 kg (176 lb)

Playing career^{1}
Years	Club	Games (Goals)
1982–1984	Essendon	42 (88)
1974–1981 & 1985-1986	Glenelg	246 (460)
- ^{1} Playing statistics correct to the end of 1986.

Stephen Copping (born 3 August 1956) is a former Australian rules footballer who played with Essendon in the Victorian Football League (VFL) and Glenelg in the South Australian National Football League (SANFL) during the 1980s.

After finishing as Glenelg's joint leading goal kicker in 1979 and outright in 1981, Essendon recruited Copping and he made his senior VFL debut in the opening round of the 1982 VFL season. He finished the year with 45 goals, a tally which included four from their Elimination Final loss to North Melbourne. The following season he had another good year in front of goals, kicking 42 goals, with a career best haul of seven against Footscray at home and two further bags of six.

A South Australian interstate representative, Copping won a Fos Williams Medal for his efforts against Victoria at Football Park in 1982.

Copping returned to Glenelg in 1985 and topped their goal kicking once more with 83 goals and played in their premiership team. Glenelg went back to back in 1986 and Copping again featured in their side. In 2004 he was inducted into the club's 'Hall of Fame'
