= 1983 VFL grand final =

Grand final of the 1983 Victorian Football League season

1983 VFL Grand Final

Hawthorn	Essendon
20.20 (140)	8.9 (57)
	1	2	3	4
HAW	5.6 (36)	12.10 (82)	16.18 (114)	20.20 (140)
ESS	3.0 (18)	4.1 (25)	4.3 (27)	8.9 (57)
- Date: 24 September 1983
- Stadium: Melbourne Cricket Ground, Melbourne, Australia
- Attendance: 110,332
- Umpires: Nash & Smith

Ceremonies
- National anthem: Glenn Shorrock

Accolades
- Norm Smith Medallist: Colin Robertson (Hawthorn)
- Jock McHale Medallist: Allan Jeans

Broadcast in Australia
- Network: Seven Network
- Commentators: Lou Richards (commentator); Peter Landy (commentator); Bob Skilton (expert commentator); Stephen Phillips (boundary reporter)

The 1983 VFL Grand Final was an Australian rules football game contested between the Hawthorn Football Club and Essendon Football Club, held at the Melbourne Cricket Ground in Melbourne on 24 September 1983. It was the 87th annual Grand Final of the Victorian Football League, staged to determine the premiers for the 1983 VFL season. The match, attended by 110,332 spectators, was won by Hawthorn by a margin of 83 points, marking that club's fifth premiership victory. This VFL Grand Final was the first of seven consecutive VFL Grand Final appearances for Hawthorn, continuing all the way to 1989.

== Background ==
It was Essendon's first Grand Final appearance since losing the 1968 VFL Grand Final, while it was Hawthorn's first appearance since winning the 1978 VFL Grand Final. The Bombers had not won a flag since winning the 1965 VFL Grand Final.

At the conclusion of the home and away season, Hawthorn had finished second on the VFL ladder (one game behind North Melbourne) with 15 wins and 7 losses. Essendon had finished fourth, also with 15 wins and 7 losses, but with an inferior percentage.

In the finals series leading up to the Grand Final, the Bombers defeated Carlton by 33 points in the Elimination Final before defeating Fitzroy in the First Semi-Final by 23 points. They advanced to the Grand Final after comfortably beating North Melbourne by 86 points in the Preliminary Final. The Hawks defeated Fitzroy in the Qualifying Final by just 4 points and then defeated North Melbourne by 40 points to progress to the Grand Final.

== Teams ==
Hawthorn	Essendon

Hawthorn
B:	7 Gary Ayres	46 Chris Mew	8 David O'Halloran
HB:	29 Russell Greene	20 Michael McCarthy	34 John Kennedy
C:	30 Peter Schwab	16 Terry Wallace	26 Rodney Eade
HF:	11 Gary Buckenara	23 Dermott Brereton	24 Peter Knights
F:	3 Leigh Matthews (c)	21 Michael Byrne	22 Richard Loveridge
Foll:	12 Ian Paton	17 Michael Tuck	32 Colin Robertson
Int:	9 Robert DiPierdomenico	1 Ken Judge	
Coach:	Allan Jeans		

Essendon
B:	9 Shane Heard	28 Paul Weston	17 Stephen Carey
HB:	10 Garry Foulds	30 Kevin Walsh	36 Peter Bradbury
C:	33 Glenn Hawker	1 Merv Neagle	2 Bryan Wood
HF:	23 Rene Kink	25 Roger Merrett	43 Alan Ezard
F:	42 Darren Williams	5 Terry Daniher (c)	18 Paul Van Der Haar
Foll:	27 Simon Madden	32 Tim Watson	20 Tony Buhagiar
Int:	24 Stephen Copping	12 Cameron Clayton	
Coach:	Kevin Sheedy		

== Match summary ==
Despite losing Gary Buckenara to a knee injury in the opening minutes, Hawthorn asserted their strength early leading by 18 points at quarter time. They then completely dominated the rest of the game, scoring seven goals to one in the second quarter and holding the Bombers goalless in the third quarter, whilst adding four goals of their own. Captain Leigh Matthews kicked six goals and the Hawks had nine other goal kickers. The Norm Smith Medal was awarded to Hawthorn's Colin Robertson for being judged the best player afield.

The margin of victory was at the time the biggest in Grand Final history, beating the record which had been set by Richmond in the 1980 VFL Grand Final, and stood until it was broken by Hawthorn in the 1988 VFL Grand Final.

This match was the first in what was to be an all-time record run of seven consecutive Grand Final appearances by the Hawks. It was also the first of three consecutive Grand Finals to be contested between these teams, with the Bombers winning the 1984 VFL Grand Final and 1985 VFL Grand Final.

=== Scoreboard ===
1983 VFL Grand Final
Saturday, 24 September (14:30 (UTC+10))	Hawthorn	def.	Essendon	MCG, Melbourne (crowd: 110,332)	Report
5.6 (36); 12.10 (82); 16.18 (114); 20.20 (140)	Q1; Q2; Q3; Final	3.0 (18); 4.1 (25); 4.3 (27); 8.9 (57)	Umpires: N. Nash & K. Smith; Norm Smith Medal: Colin Robertson (Hawthorn); Television broadcast: Seven Network; National anthem: Glenn Shorrock
Matthews 6, Byrne 3, Greene 2, Judge 2, Loveridge 2, Kennedy, Knights, O'Halloran, Tuck, Wallace	Goals	Daniher 2, Copping, Ezard, Kink, Madden, Walsh, Wood
Robertson, Mew, Tuck, Matthews, Kennedy, Greene, Knights, Ayres, Wallace, Eade	Best	Daniher, Foulds, Madden, Heard
Buckenara (knee)	Injuries	Carey (shoulder)
Judge (striking), Byrne (striking)	Reports	Merrett (striking – two incidents)
The match was broadcast live on ESPN in the USA, with Ron Barrassi hosting the broadcast for US viewers.; Hawthorn's 83 point winning margin was a then VFL Grand Final record, beating the previous record of 81 points (1980).

== Tribunal ==
- Merrett (Essendon) by field umpire Nash for striking Wallace (Hawthorn) with a fist to the stomach in the third quarter. Merrett was suspended for two matches.
- Merrett (Essendon) by field umpire Smith for allegedly striking Matthews (Hawthorn) with a right hand to the face in the third quarter. Charge not sustained.
- Judge (Hawthorn) by field umpire Smith for allegedly striking Hawker (Essendon) with a right fist to the hear in the second quarter. Charge not sustained.
- Byrne (Hawthorn) by field umpire Nash for allegedly striking Van Der Haar (Essendon) with both hands to the face in the second quarter. Charge not sustained.

== Bibliography ==
- The Official statistical history of the AFL 2004
- Ross, J. (ed), 100 Years of Australian Football 1897–1996: The Complete Story of the AFL, All the Big Stories, All the Great Pictures, All the Champions, Every AFL Season Reported, Viking, (Ringwood), 1996. ISBN 0-670-86814-0

== See also ==
- 1983 VFL season
