= Eremasi Radrodro =

Rugby union player

- Full name: Eremasi Navari Radrodro
- Born: 17 September 1987 (age 39)
- Height: 6 ft 2 in (188 cm)
- Weight: 242 lb (110 kg)

Rugby union career
- Position: Back-row
International career
Years	Team	Apps	(Points)
2016	Fiji	4	(5)

Eremasi Navari Radrodro (born 17 September 1987) is a Fijian rugby union player and former international.

Radrodro is a native of Batiki island in the Lomaiviti archipelago.

A back-row forward, Radrodro has played locally for Nadroga, where he has family from, as well as Suva based club Fijian Latui. In 2016, he was capped four times for Fiji, including a Test at Twickenham against England. He spent a season in France's Pro D2 with Vannes in 2017–18 and captained Fijian Drua in the 2019 National Rugby Championship.

== See also ==
- List of Fiji national rugby union players
