= Jack Grant (rugby union) =

Australian rugby union player

- Born: 24 January 1994 (age 32) Beverley, East Yorkshire, England
- Height: 180 cm (5 ft 11 in)
- Weight: 85 kg (187 lb; 13 st 5 lb)

Rugby union career
- Position: Scrum-half
- Current team: Waratahs
Youth career
- Orange City Lions
Amateur team(s)
Years	Team	Apps	(Points)
2013–2014; 2016	Norths		
2015–	Easts		
Senior career
Years	Team	Apps	(Points)
2017	Sydney Rays	5	(0)
2018–2019	NSW Country Eagles	9	(20)
2020	NTT Red Hurricanes	1	(0)
2021–2022	Waratahs	20	(15)
2023	Ealing Trailfinders	4	(15)
2024-2025	Waratahs	17	(5)
- Correct as of 31 May 2025

Jack Grant (born 24 January 1994) is an Australian rugby union player who plays for the Waratahs in the Super Rugby. His playing position is scrum-half. He was named in the Waratahs squad for the 2021 Super Rugby AU season. He previously represented the Sydney Rays in the 2017 National Rugby Championship, the NSW Country Eagles in the 2018 and 2019 National Rugby Championships and NTT Red Hurricanes in the 2019–20 Top League in Japan.

Grant was born in the town of Beverley in England's northeastern county of East Yorkshire. He attended St Stanislaus' College, Bathurst and began playing semi-professional club rugby with Norths in Sydney's Shute Shield.
