= Rugby union in the Northern Territory =

Amateur rugby union in Australia

- Governing body: Northern Territory Rugby Union
- Representative team: NT Mosquitoes
- First played: Darwin, 24th January, 1916
- Registered players: 395

Club competitions
- Darwin (Northern Territory Rugby Union) (Central Australian Rugby Union) (Katherine Rugby Union); Alice Springs; Katherine; Hosted competitions: Darwin Hottest 7s (annual Rugby 7s tournament)

Rugby union is a mostly amateur sport within the Northern Territory in Australia. The game is run by the Northern Territory Rugby Union, composed of representatives from clubs, regional rugby unions, referees, and affiliated bodies for schools and junior rugby.

There is no professional rugby team based in NT but the annual Hottest 7s tournament held in the capital city Darwin, draws teams from around Australia and overseas, and awards prize money to the winners.

== History of rugby union in the Northern Territory ==
The first rugby union match played in Darwin was in 1916. The game was between Town and Vestees, originally planned for New Year's Day 1916, it was postponed after original plans to involve sailors from a visiting warship fell through. Vestey's won 9 to Darwin's 3 on Monday 24 January. However, after the initial fanfare, the NT Football Association (Australian rules football) commenced a month later and its popular weekly matches took the limelight off rugby for over half a century.

Efforts were made after World War I to organise matches against visiting warships in the 1920s however the arrival of rugby league in the 1920s was a further setback to organised rugby.

A rugby union competition in Darwin was started in the reconstruction phase following Cyclone Tracy. A New Zealander named David Cooper advertised for other interested players which led to the founding of the Northern Territory Rugby Union in 1975. The first Darwin club rugby competition match was played on 2 October 1976 at Alawa Oval between the South Darwin Rabbitohs and the RSL Dragons (now the Darwin Dragons).

From 1983 onward, the Bushratz RUFC from Jabiru played in the Darwin 2nd grade competition, and also briefly in the Katherine competition in 2009. However, due to a shortage of player numbers (as of 2013), the club no longer takes part in these competitions.

In 1984, the Alice Springs club competition was started by the Central Australian Rugby Union. The Katherine club competition was established by the Katherine Rugby Union in 1987. Katherine also later briefly fielded a composite team in the Darwin competition, but found the logistics associated with the travel distance difficult to sustain.

In 1989, the inaugural Territory 7s tournament was held in Darwin and won by Fijian team Duavata. The annual tournament was renamed the Hottest 7s in 2005, and the organizers in 2013 claimed it was the richest rugby sevens tournament in the Southern Hemisphere with a prize pool of $65,000.

The East Arnhem Rugby Union was created in Nhulunbuy in 2004, with a junior rugby competition played during the Dry Season between April and August. Teams from East Arnhem (initially under the name of Gove Rugby) have regularly entered tournaments such as the Darwin Hottest 7s and Singapore CC 7s.

== Participation ==
Registered players
2019	2023/24
2,837	395

== Club competitions ==
=== Darwin ===
The Darwin club rugby competition runs from March to September since switching from Wet Season to Dry Season in 2003, and is administered by the Northern Territory Rugby Union. There are six clubs based in the Darwin metropolitan area that have 1st and 2nd grade open teams, and juniors from under 7 to under 17.
Some clubs also have a women's team.

- Casuarina Cougars
- Darwin Dragons
- Palmerston Crocs
- South Darwin Rabbitohs
- Swampdogs
- University Pirates

=== Alice Springs ===
The Alice Springs club rugby competition runs over the summer from November to April and is administered by the Central Australian Rugby Union. There are four clubs (as of 2013) with one open grade team each:

- Alice Springs Eagles
- Dingo Cubs
- Federal Devils
- Kiwi Warriors

=== Katherine ===
The Katherine club rugby competition runs over the Wet Season from October to April and is administered by the Katherine Rugby Union. There are four clubs (as of 2013) with one open grade team each:

- Barbarians Rugby Union Football Club
- Brahmans Rugby Union Football Club
- Pirates Rugby Union Football Club
- Tindal Lions Rugby Union Football Club
Mosquitoes colours

== Representative teams ==
Senior and junior representative teams are selected from players within the Northern Territory each year to compete against representative rugby teams from other Australian states and territories. The senior men's team is known as the Mosquitoes and the senior women's team is known as the Goannas. Team colours are ochre, black and white.

The Mosquitoes competed in the Australian Rugby Shield prior to the cancellation of the competition after the 2008 season.

From 2018 an additional competition was formed for teams from so-called "Minor States", called the Emerging States Championship, featuring the Mosquitoes, Adelaide Black Falcons, Victoria Country Barbarians and the Tasmania Jack Jumpers. The first Competition was held in Adelaide in September 2018, and the Black Falcons were the inaugural winners.
