= Colin Robertson (footballer) =

Australian rules footballer

Personal information
- Born: 19 June 1957 (age 69)
- Original team: Wynyard (NWFU)
- Height: 182 cm (72 in)
- Weight: 81 kg (179 lb)

Playing career^{1}
Years	Club	Games (Goals)
1980–1986	Hawthorn	116 (62)
- ^{1} Playing statistics correct to the end of 1986.

Career highlights
- Hawthorn premiership player 1983; Norm Smith Medal 1983; Tassie Medal 1987

Colin Robertson (born 19 June 1957) is a former Australian rules footballer who represented Hawthorn in the Victorian Football League (VFL) during the 1980s.

A hard running player, Robertson was a versatile footballer who could play across half back, on wing or on the ball. Robertson spent six seasons with Tasmanian club Wynyard, playing in premierships with the club in 1975 and 1979 before joining Hawthorn the following season. Robertson became a key part of the club's dominance during the early 1980s. In the 1983 VFL Grand Final he became the first Tasmanian to win the Norm Smith Medal after a superb tagging job on Essendon's dangerous rover Tim Watson.

In 1987 Robertson returned to Tasmania to captain the Burnie Hawks in the Tasmanian State League for three seasons. In the last season he was Captain-Coach. He was non-playing coach of Wynyard in 1991 and 1992.

In June 2011 Robertson was upgraded to Legend status in the Tasmanian Football Hall of Fame.

== Statistics ==
Legend
G	Goals	K	Kicks	D	Disposals	T	Tackles
B	Behinds	H	Handballs	M	Marks
#	Played in that season's premiership team

Season	Team	No.	Games	Totals							Averages (per game)							Votes
Season	Team	No.	Games	G	B	K	H	D	M	T	G	B	K	H	D	M	T	Votes
1980	Hawthorn	32	11	3	6	94	50	144	20	—N/a	0.3	0.5	8.5	4.5	13.1	1.8	—N/a	3
1981	Hawthorn	32	18	17	12	218	111	329	54	—N/a	0.9	0.7	12.1	6.2	18.3	3.0	—N/a	7
1982	Hawthorn	32	19	13	14	199	150	349	70	—N/a	0.7	0.7	10.5	7.9	18.4	3.7	—N/a	5
1983^{#}	Hawthorn	32	17	3	6	182	142	324	50	—N/a	0.2	0.4	10.7	8.4	19.1	2.9	—N/a	2
1984	Hawthorn	32	23	14	14	258	188	446	68	—N/a	0.6	0.6	11.2	8.2	19.4	3.0	—N/a	0
1985	Hawthorn	32	14	6	3	127	104	231	33	—N/a	0.4	0.2	9.1	7.4	16.5	2.4	—N/a	2
1986	Hawthorn	32	14	6	2	111	117	228	30	—N/a	0.4	0.1	7.9	8.4	16.3	2.1	—N/a	6
Career			116	62	57	1189	862	2051	325	—N/a	0.5	0.5	10.3	7.4	17.7	2.8	—N/a	25

== Honours and achievements ==
Team

- VFL premiership player (Hawthorn): 1983
- McClelland Trophy (Hawthorn): 1986

Individual

- Norm Smith Medal: 1983
- Tasmanian Football Hall of Fame: 2005 Inductee
- Tasmanian Football Hall of Fame – Legend Status: 2011
