= Serupepeli Vularika =

Fijian rugby union player (born 1990)

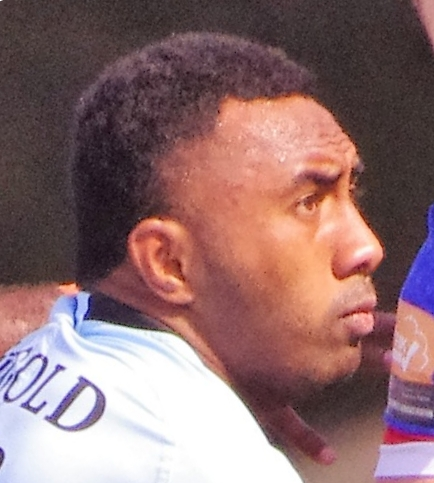
- Vularika representing Fijian Drua in the National Rugby Championship, September 2018
- Born: 29 April 1990 (age 36) Rewa, Fiji
- Height: 160 cm (5 ft 3 in)
- Weight: 81 kg (179 lb; 12 st 11 lb)
- School: Lelean Memorial School

Rugby union career
- Position(s): Scrum-half, Centre, Fly-half
- Current team: Fijian Drua
Senior career
Years	Team	Apps	(Points)
2018–	Fijian Drua	14	(40)
2019–2020	Fijian Latui	3	(0)
2021	LA Giltinis	8	(13)
- Correct as of 10 February 2022
International career
Years	Team	Apps	(Points)
2015–2018	Fiji Warriors	12	(106)
2016–2020	Fiji	12	(0)
- Correct as of 10 February 2022

Serupepeli Vularika (born 29 April 1990) is a Fijian rugby union player, currently playing for the LA Giltinis of Major League Rugby (MLR). His preferred position is scrum-half or Centre.

== Professional career ==
Vularika signed for the LA Giltinis during the 2021 Major League Rugby season in April 2021. He had previously represented the Fijian Drua in the 2018 and 2019 National Rugby Championship. He also has 12 caps for the Fiji national team, making his debut in 2016.
