= Adelaide Black Falcons =

Australian rugby union club, based in Adelaide

South Australia
- Union: South Australian Rugby Union
- Location: Adelaide, Australia
- Region: South Australia
- Ground: Coopers Stadium
- League: NRC Div.2
Team kit

The Black Falcons is a representative rugby union team based in Adelaide, South Australia. The team is selected from the best senior club players in South Australia and represents the state in matches against other Australian representative teams. They currently play in the Emerging States Championship against Tasmania, Victoria Country and the Northern Territory. The Black Falcons previously competed in the Australian Rugby Shield run by the Australian Rugby Union.

== History ==
The Black Falcons team traces its history back to the South Australian representative rugby union side that first played in 1933.

The seven-a-side South Australian Black Falcons team played at the Adelaide International Sevens tournament in the 1990s.

The name Adelaide Black Falcons was adopted for the team's entry into the Australian Rugby Shield competition in 2000. The Adelaide team played in every Shield competition until the competition folded following the 2008 season. While the Black Falcons did not win any Shield titles, the team performed consistently well with a number of players making the annual Shield Merit Team as a result.

The Black Falcons regularly play invitational matches against other states, with the team being picked out of the top 2 divisions of the men's state league.

== Notable past players ==
David Campese captained the Black Falcons at the Adelaide International Sevens tournament in 1998.

== Kit ==
The Black Falcons wear a black, red and gold kit with the letters SA on the back in red representing South Australia.

The kit manufacturers were BLK until the 2017 season, and since then have been manufactured by O'Neills.

== National Rugby Championship ==
From 2018 an additional competition was formed for teams from so-called "Minor States", called the NRC Division 2, featuring the Black Falcons, Victoria Country Barbarians, Northern Territory Mosquitoes and Tasmania Jack Jumpers. The first Competition was held in Adelaide (at the AA Bailey Reserve in Clarence Gardens) in September 2018, and the Black Falcons were the inaugural winners.

== Current squad ==
The squad for the 2019 NRC II season:

Adelaide Black Falcons squad – NRC 2019 (Note: Initial squad was named in September.)
Forwards: Blair Marshall - Captain - Burnside; Bron Lett - Adelaide University; Clark Skeldon - Brighton; Frederick Samuel - Burnside; Jack Cook - Brighton; Jaden Phillips - Brighton; Kiru Brown - Burnside; Lewis Adcock - Woodville; Liam Smith - Onkaparinga; Rhys Gurd - Brighton; Rian Murphy - Brighton; Sene Faasoa - Onkaparinga; Stevan Stanojevic - Southern Suburbs	Backs: Connor McCarthy - Southern Suburbs; Isaac Allum-Henson - Burnside; Jack Johns - Southern Suburbs; Joe Tuilawaki - Brighton; Kaedan O'Neill - Onkaparinga; Kurt McKinley - Onkaparinga; Kyle Fleetwood-Pieper - Old Collegians; Nathan Evans - Onkaparinga; Pita Bulewa - Brighton; Tere Kaue - Port Adelaide; Treymaine Butler - Brighton; Tristan Coetzer - Old Collegians; Notes:
**Bold** denotes player is internationally capped. (c) Denotes team captain. ^{1} denotes marquee player.

== Juniors ==
The Junior Falcons Under 20s team compete in the Southern States Championship against all the other Southern states of Australia. The Under 18s Schoolboys team play in the National Schoolboy Division 2 Championships (Which they are the Champion of), while the Under 16s and Under 14s Falcons play in games against other Junior Representative Teams. The FalconsUnder 12s play in the Primary School Sports Australia National Championships.

== Honours ==
- 2007 Darwin Hottest Sevens Buff Plate Champions
- 2018 Emerging States Championship Champions
