= Pama Fou =

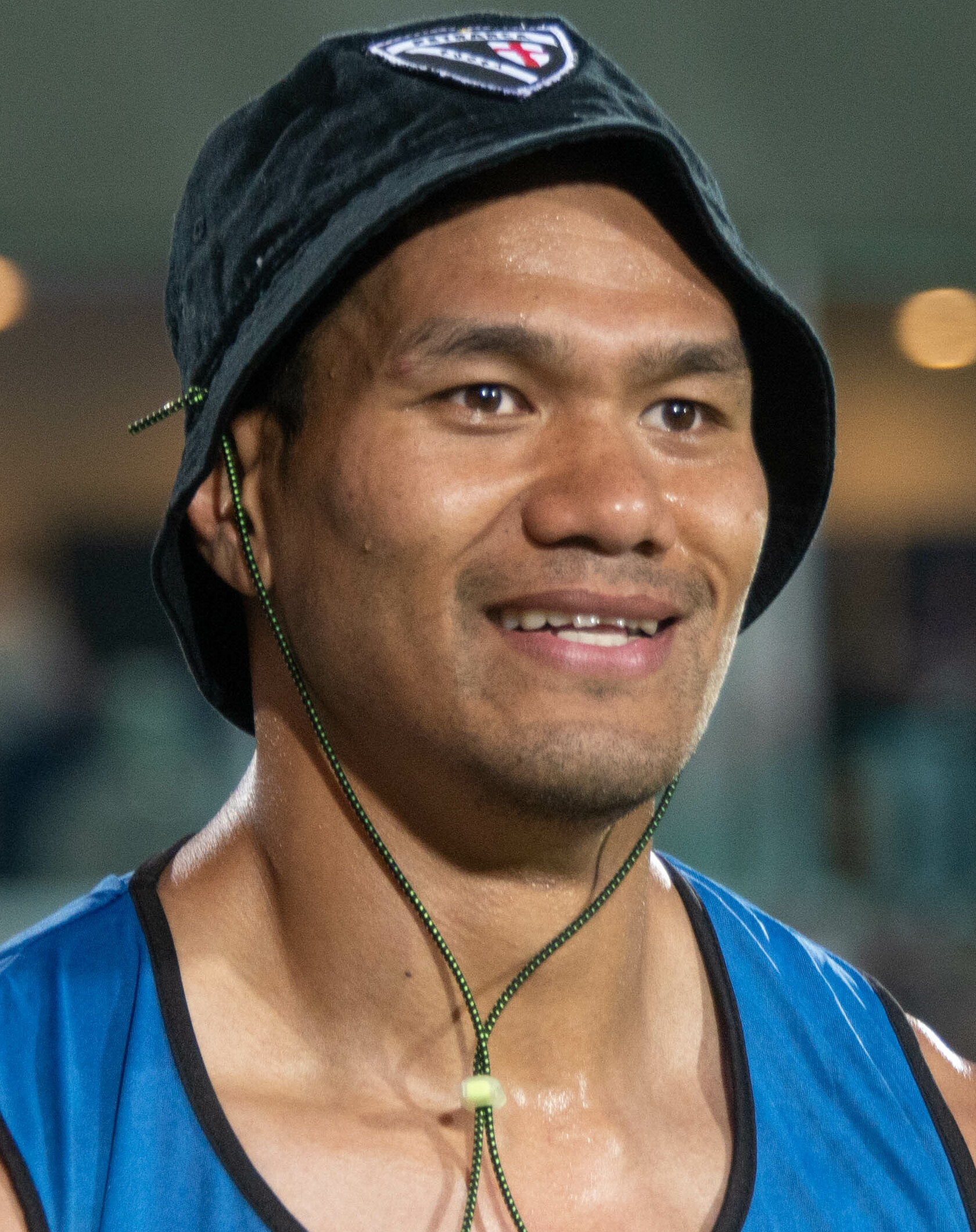
- Born: 6 September 1990 (age 36) Auckland, New Zealand
- Height: 1.96 m (6 ft 5 in)
- Weight: 91 kg (201 lb; 14 st 5 lb)

Rugby union career
Senior career
Years	Team	Apps	(Points)
2017–2018	Melbourne Rebels	0	(0)
2018–2019	Eastwood	29	(65)
2018	Sydney Rays	1	(0)
2019	Western Force	5	(20)
2021−2024	Petrarca Padova	45	(100)
National sevens team
Years	Team		Comps
2011-2016	Australia 7s		27

Pama Fou (born 6 September 1990) was a professional rugby union player. His usual position was as a Utility back and he played for italian team Petrarca Padova in Top10.

He represented Australia in Sevens Rugby. Born in Auckland, New Zealand and playing for Souths at a senior level, he debuted for Australia in October 2011. As of December 2015, he currently has 25 caps.

Pama Fou represented Queensland and made the Australian Institute of Sport squad in volleyball as a teenager before a persistent shoulder injury forced him to quit the sport aged 19. Two years later, coach Michael O'Connor plucked Pama from Brisbane rugby club Souths. Pama has played on the Sevens World Series circuit 14 times since making his debut at the 2011 Gold Coast Sevens and has been likened as the Sevens version of Wallaby superstar Israel Folau. Despite missing the 2013/14 HSBC Sevens World Series with injury, Pama was named in the 2014 Commonwealth Games squad and memorably scored the winning try in the come-from-behind win over Wales in the Cup Quarter-Finals.

In 2016 Fou signed with the Melbourne Rebels to play Super Rugby starting in 2017; he was given leave to train with the Australian Sevens, however a knee injury interrupted his Olympic preparations. In July 2016 he re-signed with the Rebels on a one-year contract. In summer 2021 he signed for Italian Serie A Elite team Petrarca Padova until 2024.

== Super Rugby statistics ==
As of 15 July 2018

Season	Team	Games	Starts	Sub	Mins	Tries	Cons	Pens	Drops	Points	Yel	Red
2017	Rebels	0	0	0	0	0	0	0	0	0	0	0
2018	Rebels	0	0	0	0	0	0	0	0	0	0	0
Total		0	0	0	0	0	0	0	0	0	0	0
