= Jordan Luke =

Australian rugby union player

- Born: 1993 or 1994 (age 32–33) Australia
- Height: 179 cm (5 ft 10 in)
- Weight: 88 kg (194 lb; 13 st 12 lb)

Rugby union career
- Position: Wing
Senior career
Years	Team	Apps	(Points)
2017	Perth Spirit	2	(0)
2019–	Brisbane City	7	(25)
- Correct as of 15 June 2020
Super Rugby
Years	Team	Apps	(Points)
2020–	Force		
- Correct as of 15 June 2020

Jordan Luke (born 1993 or 1994 in Australia) is an Australian rugby union player who plays on the wing for the Force in the Super Rugby AU competition. He was named in the Force squad for the Super Rugby AU competition in 2020.
