= Isaac Lucas (rugby union) =

Australian rugby union player

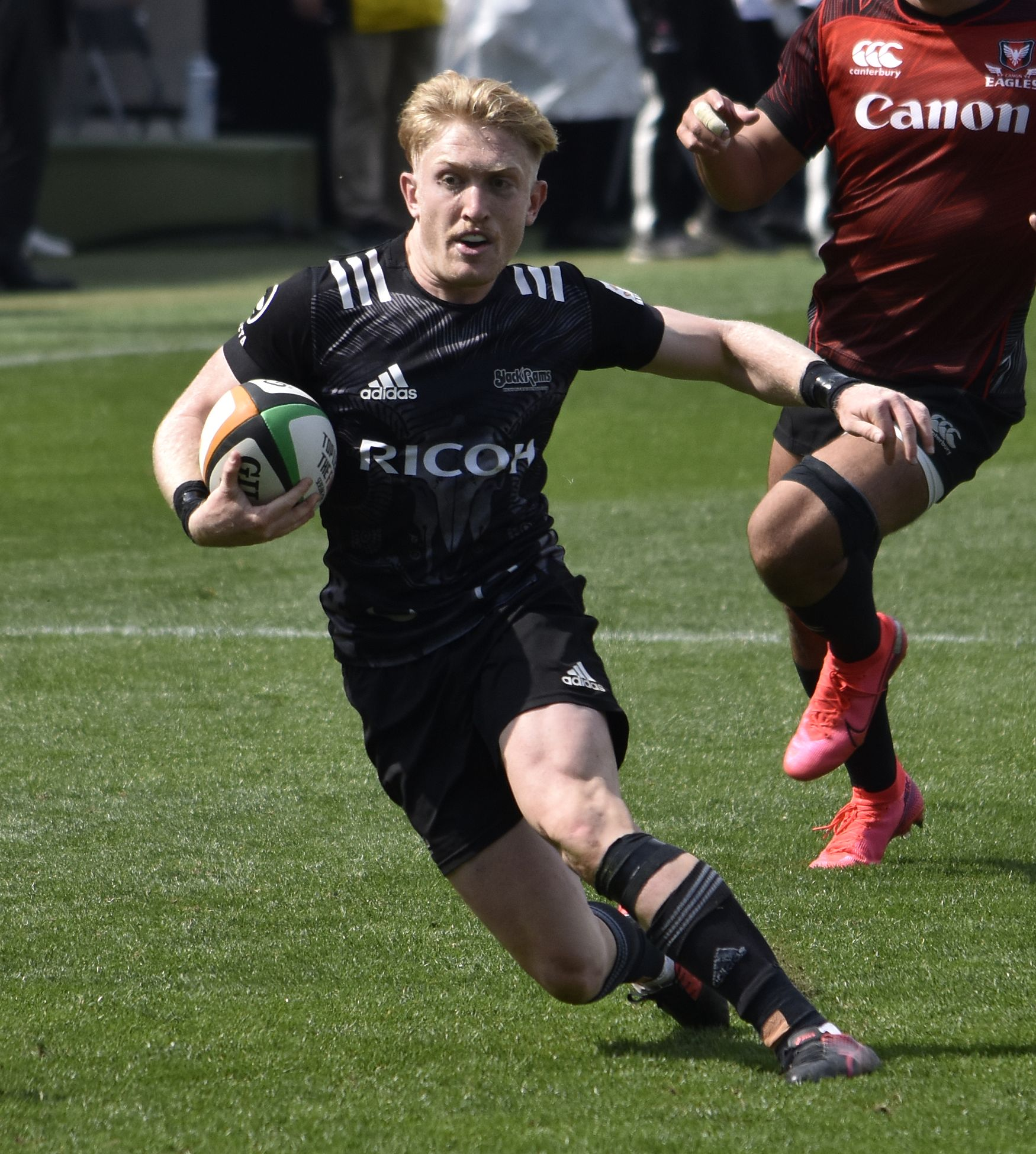
- Born: 11 February 1999 (age 27) Brisbane, Queensland, Australia
- Height: 184 cm (6 ft 0 in)
- Weight: 84 kg (185 lb; 13 st 3 lb)
- School: St Joseph's College, Gregory Terrace
- Notable relatives: Ben; Matt; Tom

Rugby union career
- Position(s): Centre, Fullback, Flyhalf
- Current team: Black Rams Tokyo
Senior career
Years	Team	Apps	(Points)
2019	Brisbane City	8	(25)
2019–2020	Reds	15	(15)
2021–	Black Rams Tokyo	78	(173)
- Correct as of 23 May 2026
International career
Years	Team	Apps	(Points)
2018–2019	Australia U20	9	(31)
Medal record
Men's rugby union
Representing Australia
Oceania U20 Championship
Winner	2019 Gold Coast
Junior World Cup
Runner-up	2019 Argentina

Isaac Lucas (born 11 February 1999) is an Australian rugby union player who is currently contracted to Ricoh Black Rams in Japanese rugby union. Lucas' primary position is fullback but he has made numerous appearances at flyhalf throughout his career. He was named in the Reds squad for week 2 in 2019.

== Career statistics ==
=== Club ===
As of 23 May 2026.

Statistics by club, season and competition
Club	Season	League						
Club	Season	Division	Apps	Tries	Con.	Pen.	Drop	Points
Brisbane City	2019	National Rugby Championship	8	4	10	0	0	25
Reds	2019	Super Rugby	8	1	0	0	0	5
Reds	2020	Super Rugby	7	2	0	0	0	10
Reds	Total		15	3	0	0	0	15
Black Rams Tokyo	2021	Top League	8	2	0	0	0	10
Black Rams Tokyo	2022	Japan Rugby League One	12	7	8	1	0	54
Black Rams Tokyo	2022–23	Japan Rugby League One	16	4	3	1	0	29
Black Rams Tokyo	2023–24	Japan Rugby League One	17	5	0	0	0	25
Black Rams Tokyo	2024–25	Japan Rugby League One	6	2	0	0	0	10
Black Rams Tokyo	2025–26	Japan Rugby League One	19	9	0	0	0	45
Black Rams Tokyo	Total		78	29	11	2	0	173
Career total			101	36	21	2	0	213
