= Northern Territory Rugby Union =

NTRU
- Sport: Rugby union
- Founded: 1975
- RA affiliation: 1978
- Website: www.ntrugby.com.au

The Northern Territory Rugby Union, or NTRU, is the governing body for the sport of rugby union within the Northern Territory in Australia. It is a member of Rugby Australia.

The Northern Territory Rugby Union manages competitions in several age groups and divisions, involving clubs from Darwin, Alice Springs, Katherine, and Nhulunbuy.

The NTRU also hosts the annual Hottest 7s tournament in Darwin, which draws Rugby 7s teams from around Australia and overseas and awards prize money to the winners.

Rugby union in Darwin started after Cyclone Tracy when there were many young men involved in the clean up and reconstruction of the city. The NTRU was founded in 1975.

The First Grade competition is contested by 5 teams from the Darwin area.

- Casuarina Cougars
- Darwin Dragons
- Palmerstown Crocs
- South Darwin Rabbitohs
- University Pirates

== See also ==
- Rugby union in the Northern Territory
- List of Australian club rugby union competitions
