= Senirusi Seruvakula =

Fiji international rugby union player & coach

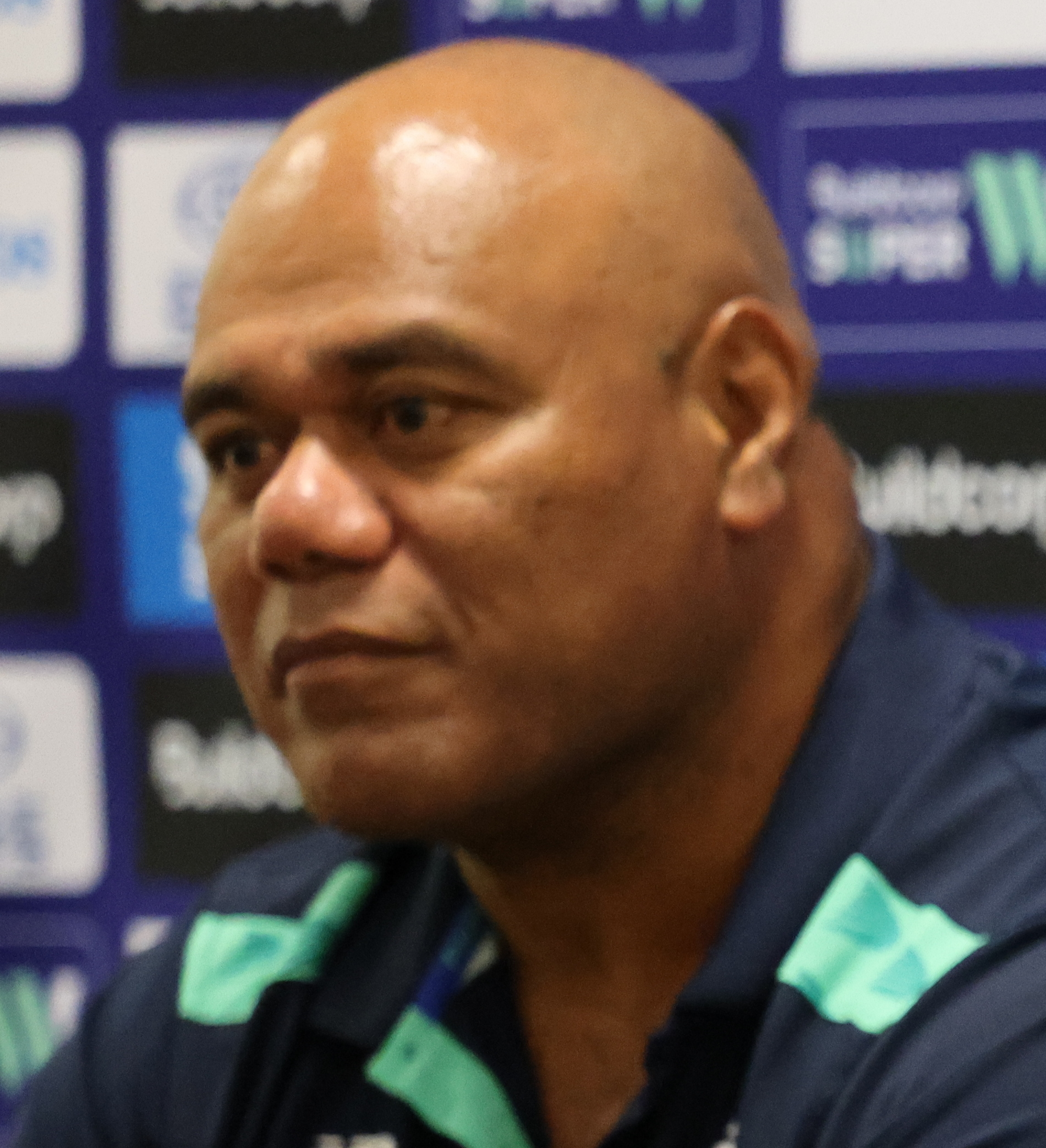
- Born: 12 November 1969 (age 57)

Rugby union career
- Position: Flanker
Senior career
Years	Team	Apps	(Points)
	Châteauneuf-du-Pape		(0)
Provincial / State sides
Years	Team	Apps	(Points)
	Naitasiri		(0)
International career
Years	Team	Apps	(Points)
2002	Fiji	1	(0)
Coaching career
- Years: Team
- 2017–2019: Fijian Drua
- 2019–2020: Fijian Latui
- 2015: Fiji Warriors
- 2020–present: Fiji Women
- 2022: Fijiana Drua
- 2026: Fiji (Interim)

Senirusi Seruvakula (born 12 November 1969) is a Fijian rugby union coach. He is currently the head coach of the Fiji women's national rugby union team.

== Rugby career ==
Seruvakula played for the Brothers Rugby Club in Brisbane for seven years. He made only one international appearance for Fiji in 2002 against Samoa. He spent four years with Hong Kong's DeA Tigers, and had a stint with Châteauneuf-du-Pape in France's Fédérale 1 competition.

=== Coaching ===
Seruvakula coached the Fijian Drua from 2017 to 2019. He led them to win the 2018 National Rugby Championship. He has also coached the Fijian Latui in the Global Rapid Rugby competition, and the Fiji Warriors.

Seruvakula was appointed as Head Coach of the Fiji women's national rugby union team in 2020. In 2022, He led the Fijiana Drua to win the Super W title in only their first year of competition.

In April 2026, following the departure of Mick Byrne, Seruvakula was appointed interim head coach of the Fiji national team. In October was relieved of his duties with the Fiji men's team after the Fiji Rugby Union (FRU) announced the appointment of new head coach Jake White.

Sporting positions
Preceded by Mick Byrne	Fiji National Rugby Union Coach (Interim); 2026	Succeeded by Jake White
