= Darwin Hottest Sevens =

Rugby sevens tournament in Darwin, Australia

Hottest 7s in the World
- Formerly: Territory 7s (1989–2004)
- Sport: Rugby 7s
- Founded: 1989
- No. of teams: 40+
- Venues: Darwin, Australia
- Most recent champions: Tabadamu (Croc Cup); Classic Wallaroos (Jabiru Cup)
- Sponsor: Heineken
- Website: hottest7s.com

The Darwin Hottest Sevens, known as the Hottest 7s in the World or the Hottest 7s, is a rugby sevens tournament held annually in Darwin, Australia on a weekend in early October. The event is sponsored by Heineken and is hosted by the Northern Territory Rugby Union. The tournament draws club teams and national teams from many countries around the world, including New Zealand, Papua New Guinea, Fiji, Samoa, England, Singapore, Malaysia, Japan and Australia.

The competition began in 1989, as the Territory Sevens, with the inaugural event being won by Fijian team, Duavata. The tournament was re-branded as the Hottest 7s in 2005, and has been supported by the Northern Territory Government since 2009. The organisers in 2013 claimed it was the richest rugby sevens tournament in the Southern Hemisphere with a prize pool of $65,000. The tournament was cancelled in 2020, but returned in 2021.

== Format ==
The tournament attracts around forty to fifty teams each year. As of 2014, there were thirty-two men's teams and eight women's teams.

In the men's competition the top eight teams are seeded and eight pools of four teams each are drawn, with each team playing all others in their pool once. The top two teams from each pool advance to the Cup/Plate bracket, and the bottom two teams from each group enter the Bowl/Shield bracket. There are quarter-finals, semi-finals and finals matches in each bracket to decide the winners of the Croc Cup, Buff Plate, Barra Bowl, and Gecko Shield trophies.

For the women's competition, two pools of four teams each are drawn, with each team playing all others in their pool once to determine the seedings for the finals matches. There are quarter-finals, semi-finals and a final to decide the winner of the Jabiriu Cup.

== Winners ==
The Hottest Sevens tournament trophy winners are listed below (results from 1989 to 2004 are for the Territory Sevens):

=== Croc Cup competition ===
- 2022 – Tabadamu (Fiji)
- 2021 – Tabadamu (Fiji)
- 2020 – not contested
- 2019 – Miwatj Stallions
- 2018 – Borneo Eagles
- 2017 – Darwin Stallions (NZ)
- 2016 – Tabadamu (Fiji)
- 2015 – Borneo Eagles
- 2014 – Hong Kong
- 2013 – Auckland
- 2012 – Borneo Eagles
- 2011 – Borneo Eagles
- 2010 – Borneo Eagles
- 2009 – Samoa Barbarians
- 2008 – South Sea Drifters (Fiji)
- 2007 – South Sea Drifters (Fiji)
- 2006 – Fiji Barbarians
- 2005 – Aussie Spirit
- 2004 – Darwin Dingoes
- 2003 – Potoroos
- 2002 – Hong Kong
- 2001 – NZ Batt 3
- 2000 – Fiji Services
- 1999 – Darwin Dingoes
- 1998 – Potoroos
- 1997 – Potoroos
- 1996 – Burnside
- 1995 – Sydney University
- 1994 – Duavata
- 1993 – Hong Kong
- 1992 – Duavata
- 1991 – Sydney University
- 1990 – AIS
- 1989 – Duavata

=== Buff Plate competition ===
- 2022 – Pristine Warriors
- 2021 – Strait Balas 7s
- 2020 – not contested
- 2019 – Western Sydney Two Blues
- 2018 – Darwin Stallions (NZ)
- 2017 – Australian Development VII
- 2016 – Brisbane Fiji
- 2015 – NT Mosquitos
- 2014 – Country King Browns
- 2013 – Papua New Guinea
- 2012 – NT Mosquitos
- 2011 – Western Wolfpack
- 2010 – NT Mosquitos
- 2009 – Randwick
- 2008 – NT Mosquitos
- 2007 – Adelaide Black Falcons
- 2006 – Aussie Legends
- 2005 – Potoroos
- 2004 – Burnside
- 2003 – Casuarina
- 2002 – South Darwin
- 2001 – South Darwin
- 2000 – University Pirates
- 1999 – Albatross
- 1998 – Aussie Signs
- 1997 – South Darwin
- 1996 – Palmerston Crocs
- 1995 – HMAS Albatross
- 1994 – Bayside
- 1993 – RSL Dragons
- 1992 – Singapore Cricket Club
- 1991 – Singapore Cricket Club
- 1990 – Crocs
- 1989 – Phantoms

=== Barra Bowl competition ===
- 2022 – Northern Marlins
- 2021 – East Arnhem
- 2020 – not contested
- 2019 – Casuarina Cougars
- 2018 – Gumatji Cavaliers
- 2017 – Narraro (Fiji)
- 2016 – Burnside (Adelaide)
- 2015 – Noosa Dolphins
- 2014 – Southern Lions
- 2013 – East Arnhem
- 2012 – Bungendore Mudchooks
- 2011 – East Arnhem
- 2010 – Alice Springs
- 2009 – Darwin Dingoes
- 2008 – Alice Springs
- 2007 – Brahmans
- 2006 – Ironsides (Army)
- 2005 – Full Damage
- 2004 – Dragons Green
- 2003 – Swampdogs
- 2002 – Singapore Cricket Club
- 2001 – Poddles
- 2000 – Poddles
- 1999 – Lions
- 1998 – Dragons
- 1997 – Aussie Signs
- 1996 – Airport Hotel Cougars
- 1995 – Pints
- 1994 – RSL Dragons
- 1993 – Lions
- 1992 – Pandata Panthers
- 1991 – Darwin U21
- 1990 – Cougars

=== Gecko Shield competition ===
- 2022 – South Darwin
- 2021 – not contested
- 2020 – not contested
- 2019 – Central Crewsaders
- 2018 – Northern NSW Hogs
- 2017 – Honkers (Aust)
- 2016 – East Arnhem
- 2015 – Central Crusaderz
- 2014 – University
- 2013 – South Darwin
- 2012 – Groote Eylandt
- 2011 – Palmerston
- 2010 – Brahmans Boks
- 2009 – Groote Eylandt
- 2008 – Groote Eylandt

=== Player of the tournament ===
- 2020 – not contested
- 2019 – Abele Atunaisa (Legends Tabadamu)
- 2018 – Celia Dranes (France Development women)
- 2017 – Penitoa Finau (Darwin Stallions)
- 2016 – Mahalia Murphy (Tribe 7s women)
- 2015 – Junior Laloifi (Tribe 7s)
- 2014 – Jamie Hood (Hong Kong)
- 2013 – Jona Tuitoga (Auckland)
- 2012 – Richie Ah Chong (Borneo Eagles)
- 2011 – Philip Tuigimala (Borneo Eagles)
- 2010 – Rocky Khan (Borneo Eagles)
- 2009 – Ofisa Treviranus (Samoa Barbarians)
- 2008 – Lepani Nabuliwaqa (South Sea Drifters)
- 2007 – David Eri (PNG Barbarians)
- 2006 – Lepani Nabuliwaqa (South Sea Drifters)
- 2005 – Nick Reily (Aussie Spirit)
- 2004 – Kenny Niki (Dingoes)
- 2003 – Peter Hewat (Potoroos)

=== Jabiru Women's Cup competition ===
- 2021 – Classic Wallaroos/1st Nations Development
- 2021 – Reds/Queensland Academy of Sport
- 2020 – not contested
- 2019 – Miwatj/Festerville Industries Stallions
- 2018 – France Development
- 2017 – Australian Women's Development VII
- 2016 – Tribe 7s
- 2015 – Tribe 7s (invitational team – Aust.)
- 2014 – Hong Kong
- 2013 – Sunnybank
- 2012 – Aussie Pearls
- 2011 – Eastsyde 7's
- 2010 – Queensland
- 2009 – Zonnators
- 2008 – Arrongatahi NZ
- 2007 – Northern Territory Invitations
- 2004 – University Pirates
- 2003 – University Pirates
- 2002 – Hong Kong
- 2001 – Casuarina
- 2000 – Pints Dragons
- 1999 – NTIS
- 1998 – Pints Dragons
- 1997 – University Pirates
- 1996 – Casuarina Cougars
- 1995 – Palmerston Sweethearts

=== Jacana Women's Plate competition ===
- 2022 – not contested
- 2021 – not contested
- 2020 – not contested
- 2019 – University Pirates
- 2018 – not contested
- 2017 – Central Queensland Dingoes
- 2016 – not contested
- 2015 – Sydney University
