= Enele Malele =

Fijian rugby union player (born 1990)

- Full name: Tikotani Enele Malele
- Born: 26 September 1990 (age 36) Suva, Fiji
- Height: 188 cm (6 ft 2 in)
- Weight: 89 kg (196 lb; 14 st 0 lb)
- School: Suva Grammar School

Rugby union career
- Position(s): Fullback, Fly-half
Senior career
Years	Team	Apps	(Points)
2018–2019	Fijian Drua	11	(76)
2019–2020	Fijian Latui	5	(10)
- Correct as of 10 February 2022
International career
Years	Team	Apps	(Points)
2018–2019	Fiji Warriors	6	(19)
- Correct as of 10 February 2022

Enele Malele (born 26 September 1990) is a Fijian professional rugby union player. He plays as a Fullback, Winger or Flyhalf for the Austin Herd in Major League Rugby, previously playing for Fijian Drua in the Australian National Rugby Championship and Fijian Latui in Global Rapid Rugby.
