= Ratunaisa Navuma =

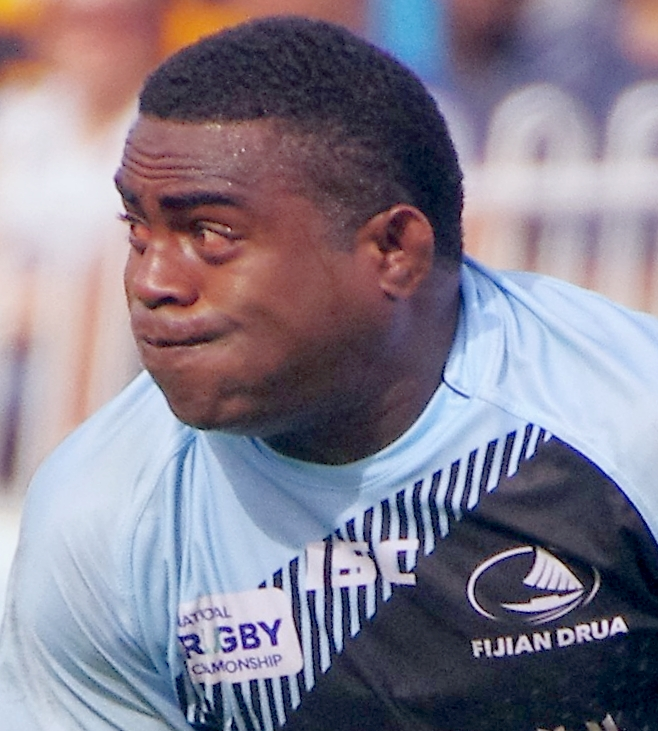
- Born: 20 November 1993 (age 32)

Rugby union career
- Position: Hooker
Senior career
| Years | Team | Apps | (Points) |
| 2017–19 | Fijian Drua | | |
International career
| Years | Team | Apps | (Points) |
| 2017–18 | Fiji | 2 | (0) |

Ratunaisa Navuma (born 20 November 1993) is a Fijian international rugby union player.

== Biography ==
Navuma comes from the village of Tilivalevu, situated on the rugged hills outside Sigatoka.

A hooker, Navuma gained his first Fiji call up in 2017 for the end of year internationals in Europe, debuting for the Flying Fijians off the bench against Canada. He was capped a second time the following year in a home Test against Georgia.

Navuma played for Fijian Drua during the team's period competing in Australia's National Rugby Championship and serves as captain of Nadroga in domestic rugby. He has also played for the Tovolea club.

== See also ==
- List of Fiji national rugby union players
