= 1983 VFL season =

87th season of the Victorian Football League (VFL)

1983 VFL premiership season
- Teams: 12
- Premiers: Hawthorn; 5th premiership
- Minor premiers: North Melbourne; 3rd minor premiership
- Night series: Carlton; 1st Night series win
- Brownlow Medallist: Ross Glendinning; North Melbourne (24 votes)
- Coleman Medallist: Bernie Quinlan; Fitzroy (106 goals)

Attendance
- Matches played: 138
- Total attendance: 3,638,017 (26,362 per match)
- Highest: 110,332

The 1983 VFL season was the 87th season of the Victorian Football League (VFL), the highest-level senior Australian rules football competition in Victoria.

The season featured twelve clubs, ran from 26 March until 24 September, and comprised a 22-game home-and-away season followed by a finals series featuring the top five clubs.

Before the season, the South Melbourne Football Club, which had played its home games in Sydney, New South Wales, in 1982, formally relocated its operations to Sydney and was renamed the Sydney Swans.

The Hawthorn Football Club won the premiership for the fifth time after it defeated Essendon by 83 points in the 1983 VFL Grand Final.

== Night series ==
Carlton defeated Richmond 14.16 (100) to 10.6 (66) in the final.

== Home-and-away season ==
=== Round 1 ===
Home team	Home team score	Away team	Away team score	Venue	Crowd	Date
North Melbourne	14.16 (100)	St Kilda	12.15 (87)	Arden Street Oval	18,496	26 March 1983
Fitzroy	16.16 (112)	Hawthorn	20.11 (131)	Junction Oval	15,626	26 March 1983
Carlton	20.16 (136)	Richmond	11.10 (76)	Princes Park	28,108	26 March 1983
Melbourne	19.11 (125)	Collingwood	20.15 (135)	MCG	72,274	26 March 1983
Geelong	15.16 (106)	Footscray	11.9 (75)	VFL Park	18,377	26 March 1983
Sydney	17.9 (111)	Essendon	15.20 (110)	SCG	12,001	27 March 1983

=== Round 2 ===
Home team	Home team score	Away team	Away team score	Venue	Crowd	Date
Collingwood	14.12 (96)	Geelong	15.11 (101)	Victoria Park	34,851	2 April 1983
Richmond	15.10 (100)	Melbourne	18.11 (119)	MCG	41,889	2 April 1983
Footscray	14.15 (99)	Carlton	12.10 (82)	Western Oval	20,414	2 April 1983
Hawthorn	9.16 (70)	Sydney	5.15 (45)	Princes Park	16,159	4 April 1983
Essendon	20.11 (131)	St Kilda	10.10 (70)	Windy Hill	27,566	4 April 1983
North Melbourne	6.7 (43)	Fitzroy	12.16 (88)	VFL Park	23,788	4 April 1983

=== Round 3 ===
Home team	Home team score	Away team	Away team score	Venue	Crowd	Date
Geelong	13.16 (94)	Richmond	6.10 (46)	Kardinia Park	23,643	9 April 1983
Footscray	16.15 (111)	Melbourne	11.13 (79)	Western Oval	20,608	9 April 1983
St Kilda	6.6 (42)	Hawthorn	26.15 (171)	Moorabbin Oval	19,227	9 April 1983
Fitzroy	14.13 (97)	Essendon	7.14 (56)	Junction Oval	19,823	9 April 1983
Carlton	13.19 (97)	Collingwood	11.21 (87)	VFL Park	69,596	9 April 1983
Sydney	5.15 (45)	North Melbourne	27.23 (185)	SCG	11,831	10 April 1983

=== Round 4 ===
Home team	Home team score	Away team	Away team score	Venue	Crowd	Date
North Melbourne	18.19 (127)	Richmond	14.19 (103)	Arden Street Oval	14,822	16 April 1983
Fitzroy	17.23 (125)	Sydney	6.16 (52)	Junction Oval	10,738	16 April 1983
Hawthorn	12.25 (97)	Footscray	17.16 (118)	Princes Park	16,026	16 April 1983
Essendon	20.21 (141)	Collingwood	17.15 (117)	Windy Hill	27,888	16 April 1983
Melbourne	13.12 (90)	Carlton	14.15 (99)	MCG	38,544	16 April 1983
St Kilda	11.13 (79)	Geelong	13.12 (90)	VFL Park	20,826	16 April 1983

=== Round 5 ===
Home team	Home team score	Away team	Away team score	Venue	Crowd	Date
Collingwood	9.19 (73)	Hawthorn	14.11 (95)	Victoria Park	28,506	23 April 1983
Carlton	9.11 (65)	Fitzroy	18.17 (125)	Princes Park	25,971	23 April 1983
Sydney	24.16 (160)	St Kilda	21.11 (137)	SCG	11,276	24 April 1983
Geelong	16.14 (110)	Melbourne	18.13 (121)	Kardinia Park	27,645	25 April 1983
Richmond	17.12 (114)	Footscray	18.8 (116)	MCG	51,651	25 April 1983
Essendon	20.8 (128)	North Melbourne	17.21 (123)	VFL Park	47,722	25 April 1983

=== Round 6 ===
Home team	Home team score	Away team	Away team score	Venue	Crowd	Date
Melbourne	18.18 (126)	Sydney	12.21 (93)	MCG	22,590	30 April 1983
Essendon	27.19 (181)	Footscray	7.7 (49)	Windy Hill	25,151	30 April 1983
Collingwood	19.16 (130)	North Melbourne	15.18 (108)	Victoria Park	28,016	30 April 1983
Carlton	12.13 (85)	Geelong	14.11 (95)	Princes Park	25,480	30 April 1983
St Kilda	15.12 (102)	Fitzroy	22.11 (143)	Moorabbin Oval	16,154	30 April 1983
Hawthorn	12.16 (88)	Richmond	15.16 (106)	VFL Park	33,096	30 April 1983

=== Round 7 ===
Home team	Home team score	Away team	Away team score	Venue	Crowd	Date
Hawthorn	13.13 (91)	North Melbourne	21.16 (142)	Princes Park	13,945	7 May 1983
Fitzroy	11.10 (76)	Geelong	9.13 (67)	Junction Oval	18,770	7 May 1983
Richmond	16.16 (112)	Essendon	21.11 (137)	MCG	49,707	7 May 1983
Footscray	11.16 (82)	Collingwood	14.4 (88)	Western Oval	31,479	7 May 1983
Melbourne	16.12 (108)	St Kilda	11.9 (75)	VFL Park	25,192	7 May 1983
Sydney	18.10 (118)	Carlton	22.17 (149)	SCG	15,432	8 May 1983

=== Round 8 ===
	Round 8
Saturday, 14 May (2:10 pm)	St Kilda 12.17 (89)	def. by	Carlton 22.13 (145)	Moorabbin Oval (crowd: 19,016)	Report
Saturday, 14 May (2:10 pm)	Collingwood 16.11 (107)	def.	Richmond 8.11 (59)	VFL Park (crowd: 58,780)	Report
Saturday, 14 May (2:10 pm)	Hawthorn 20.17 (137)	def.	Essendon 14.11 (95)	Princes Park (crowd: 21,835)	Report
Saturday, 14 May (2:10 pm)	Melbourne 12.15 (87)	def. by	Fitzroy 18.18 (126)	MCG (crowd: 33,758)	Report
Saturday, 14 May (2:10 pm)	North Melbourne 29.15 (189)	def.	Footscray 11.8 (74)	Arden Street Oval (crowd: 15,556)	Report
Saturday, 14 May (2:10 pm)	Geelong 11.18 (84)	def. by	Sydney 16.14 (110)	Kardinia Park (crowd: 17,650)	Report
North Melbourne broke the record for their highest League score in front of over 15,000 supporters at Arden Street Oval. After going into the main break with a 39-point lead and coach Barry Cable urging them be more ruthless, they piled on 12 goals in the third quarter to extend the lead to over 100 points. The play of brothers Jim and Phil Krakouer was a particular highlight, combining with Kym Hodgeman to kick 13 goals between them.; Playing in the forward pocket due to knee difficulties, Fitzroy captain Garry Wilson kicked six goals to help the Lions pull away to a 39-point win over Melbourne, who had stayed in the game for three-quarters despite missing a number of senior players and losing key forward Kelvin Templeton as a late withdrawal.

=== Round 9 ===
Home team	Home team score	Away team	Away team score	Venue	Crowd	Date
Geelong	12.12 (84)	North Melbourne	18.16 (124)	Kardinia Park	21,802	21 May 1983
Essendon	22.17 (149)	Melbourne	17.13 (115)	Windy Hill	19,850	21 May 1983
Carlton	15.14 (104)	Hawthorn	14.12 (96)	Princes Park	30,750	21 May 1983
St Kilda	16.12 (108)	Richmond	13.15 (93)	Moorabbin Oval	20,686	21 May 1983
Fitzroy	13.21 (99)	Footscray	22.13 (145)	VFL Park	22,336	21 May 1983
Sydney	18.13 (121)	Collingwood	14.16 (100)	SCG	15,305	22 May 1983

=== Round 10 ===
Home team	Home team score	Away team	Away team score	Venue	Crowd	Date
Richmond	16.10 (106)	Sydney	14.10 (94)	MCG	21,047	28 May 1983
Footscray	17.26 (128)	St Kilda	11.16 (82)	Western Oval	19,247	28 May 1983
Essendon	15.19 (109)	Geelong	15.7 (97)	Windy Hill	20,782	28 May 1983
Collingwood	10.17 (77)	Fitzroy	13.15 (93)	Victoria Park	32,820	28 May 1983
North Melbourne	29.19 (193)	Carlton	11.16 (82)	Arden Street Oval	22,776	28 May 1983
Melbourne	16.13 (109)	Hawthorn	27.9 (171)	VFL Park	23,988	28 May 1983

=== Round 11 ===
Home team	Home team score	Away team	Away team score	Venue	Crowd	Date
Melbourne	18.17 (125)	North Melbourne	20.19 (139)	MCG	25,249	4 June 1983
Fitzroy	20.16 (136)	Richmond	16.18 (114)	Junction Oval	16,153	4 June 1983
Hawthorn	12.16 (88)	Geelong	14.11 (95)	Princes Park	13,465	4 June 1983
St Kilda	21.18 (144)	Collingwood	24.16 (160)	Moorabbin Oval	25,153	4 June 1983
Carlton	15.11 (101)	Essendon	19.12 (126)	VFL Park	60,619	4 June 1983
Sydney	17.19 (121)	Footscray	15.12 (102)	SCG	10,710	5 June 1983

=== Round 12 ===
Home team	Home team score	Away team	Away team score	Venue	Crowd	Date
Footscray	15.12 (102)	Geelong	14.7 (91)	Western Oval	25,382	11 June 1983
St Kilda	15.14 (104)	North Melbourne	20.15 (135)	Moorabbin Oval	15,467	11 June 1983
Hawthorn	25.17 (167)	Fitzroy	21.8 (134)	Princes Park	20,559	11 June 1983
Essendon	23.18 (156)	Sydney	13.5 (83)	Windy Hill	20,535	13 June 1983
Richmond	21.15 (141)	Carlton	13.13 (91)	MCG	48,243	13 June 1983
Collingwood	12.15 (87)	Melbourne	10.8 (68)	VFL Park	55,380	13 June 1983

=== Round 13 ===
Home team	Home team score	Away team	Away team score	Venue	Crowd	Date
St Kilda	13.13 (91)	Essendon	21.12 (138)	VFL Park	30,616	18 June 1983
Geelong	15.11 (101)	Collingwood	13.7 (85)	Kardinia Park	25,808	18 June 1983
Melbourne	18.15 (123)	Richmond	15.19 (109)	MCG	28,468	18 June 1983
Fitzroy	34.16 (220)	North Melbourne	10.10 (70)	Junction Oval	19,770	18 June 1983
Carlton	26.15 (171)	Footscray	12.10 (82)	Princes Park	23,710	18 June 1983
Sydney	11.12 (78)	Hawthorn	15.20 (110)	SCG	10,084	19 June 1983

=== Round 14 ===
Home team	Home team score	Away team	Away team score	Venue	Crowd	Date
North Melbourne	11.16 (82)	Sydney	7.8 (50)	Arden Street Oval	7,408	25 June 1983
Hawthorn	21.17 (143)	St Kilda	9.20 (74)	Princes Park	8,190	25 June 1983
Essendon	8.10 (58)	Fitzroy	9.11 (65)	Windy Hill	22,925	25 June 1983
Melbourne	14.15 (99)	Footscray	12.13 (85)	MCG	19,306	25 June 1983
Collingwood	15.10 (100)	Carlton	6.9 (45)	Victoria Park	27,778	25 June 1983
Richmond	11.4 (70)	Geelong	10.9 (69)	VFL Park	17,339	25 June 1983

=== Round 15 ===
Home team	Home team score	Away team	Away team score	Venue	Crowd	Date
Footscray	9.6 (60)	Hawthorn	13.11 (89)	VFL Park	15,750	2 July 1983
Carlton	9.13 (67)	Melbourne	15.16 (106)	Princes Park	19,300	2 July 1983
Geelong	9.14 (68)	St Kilda	18.12 (120)	Kardinia Park	11,459	2 July 1983
Collingwood	16.8 (104)	Essendon	13.9 (87)	Victoria Park	33,614	2 July 1983
Richmond	16.18 (114)	North Melbourne	21.12 (138)	MCG	23,622	2 July 1983
Sydney	23.9 (147)	Fitzroy	17.15 (117)	SCG	10,315	3 July 1983

=== Round 16 ===
Home team	Home team score	Away team	Away team score	Venue	Crowd	Date
Footscray	12.12 (84)	Richmond	15.14 (104)	Western Oval	15,006	9 July 1983
North Melbourne	19.14 (128)	Essendon	16.11 (107)	Arden Street Oval	22,340	9 July 1983
Fitzroy	13.11 (89)	Carlton	18.16 (124)	VFL Park	31,757	9 July 1983
St Kilda	20.9 (129)	Sydney	14.16 (100)	Moorabbin Oval	17,861	16 July 1983
Melbourne	10.19 (79)	Geelong	10.13 (73)	MCG	34,155	16 July 1983
Hawthorn	19.23 (137)	Collingwood	14.16 (100)	Princes Park	28,595	16 July 1983

=== Round 17 ===
Home team	Home team score	Away team	Away team score	Venue	Crowd	Date
North Melbourne	24.8 (152)	Collingwood	14.14 (98)	VFL Park	41,098	23 July 1983
Richmond	11.16 (82)	Hawthorn	22.14 (146)	MCG	31,084	23 July 1983
Footscray	16.11 (107)	Essendon	18.17 (125)	Western Oval	20,708	23 July 1983
Geelong	11.7 (73)	Carlton	15.18 (108)	Kardinia Park	17,657	23 July 1983
Fitzroy	20.18 (138)	St Kilda	22.17 (149)	Junction Oval	15,335	23 July 1983
Sydney	18.17 (125)	Melbourne	16.16 (112)	SCG	11,094	24 July 1983

=== Round 18 ===
Home team	Home team score	Away team	Away team score	Venue	Crowd	Date
Essendon	6.14 (50)	Richmond	19.10 (124)	Windy Hill	18,050	30 July 1983
Collingwood	12.10 (82)	Footscray	9.19 (73)	Victoria Park	20,743	30 July 1983
Carlton	17.17 (119)	Sydney	11.9 (75)	Princes Park	17,868	30 July 1983
St Kilda	11.15 (81)	Melbourne	14.14 (98)	Moorabbin Oval	20,218	30 July 1983
North Melbourne	12.18 (90)	Hawthorn	15.7 (97)	Arden Street Oval	17,720	30 July 1983
Geelong	7.7 (49)	Fitzroy	16.15 (111)	VFL Park	14,718	30 July 1983

=== Round 19 ===
Home team	Home team score	Away team	Away team score	Venue	Crowd	Date
Sydney	10.15 (75)	Geelong	20.21 (141)	SCG	12,752	5 August 1983
Fitzroy	22.29 (161)	Melbourne	11.9 (75)	Junction Oval	13,870	6 August 1983
Essendon	23.18 (156)	Hawthorn	16.14 (110)	Windy Hill	19,315	6 August 1983
Carlton	25.18 (168)	St Kilda	8.13 (61)	Princes Park	19,203	6 August 1983
Richmond	11.13 (79)	Collingwood	13.11 (89)	MCG	81,966	6 August 1983
Footscray	10.11 (71)	North Melbourne	25.14 (164)	VFL Park	12,028	6 August 1983

=== Round 20 ===
Home team	Home team score	Away team	Away team score	Venue	Crowd	Date
Collingwood	28.14 (182)	Sydney	18.12 (120)	Victoria Park	18,772	13 August 1983
North Melbourne	16.20 (116)	Geelong	11.18 (84)	Arden Street Oval	11,093	13 August 1983
Footscray	19.11 (125)	Fitzroy	14.15 (99)	Western Oval	14,688	13 August 1983
Melbourne	19.10 (124)	Essendon	21.15 (141)	MCG	38,620	13 August 1983
Hawthorn	15.22 (112)	Carlton	20.9 (129)	Princes Park	28,504	13 August 1983
Richmond	9.11 (65)	St Kilda	21.14 (140)	VFL Park	21,811	13 August 1983

=== Round 21 ===
Home team	Home team score	Away team	Away team score	Venue	Crowd	Date
Carlton	18.18 (126)	North Melbourne	13.15 (93)	Princes Park	32,610	20 August 1983
St Kilda	13.16 (94)	Footscray	16.4 (100)	Moorabbin Oval	15,680	20 August 1983
Fitzroy	19.13 (127)	Collingwood	7.21 (63)	Junction Oval	24,104	20 August 1983
Hawthorn	25.22 (172)	Melbourne	8.9 (57)	VFL Park	21,192	20 August 1983
Geelong	12.11 (83)	Essendon	26.9 (165)	Kardinia Park	20,110	20 August 1983
Sydney	10.13 (73)	Richmond	15.24 (114)	SCG	11,475	21 August 1983

=== Round 22 ===
Home team	Home team score	Away team	Away team score	Venue	Crowd	Date
Geelong	11.11 (77)	Hawthorn	24.13 (157)	Kardinia Park	11,214	27 August 1983
Footscray	17.12 (114)	Sydney	10.12 (72)	Western Oval	13,369	27 August 1983
Collingwood	24.11 (155)	St Kilda	14.8 (92)	Victoria Park	19,016	27 August 1983
North Melbourne	21.22 (148)	Melbourne	10.15 (75)	Arden Street Oval	10,603	27 August 1983
Richmond	12.21 (93)	Fitzroy	19.13 (127)	MCG	27,310	27 August 1983
Essendon	18.10 (118)	Carlton	8.19 (67)	VFL Park	64,232	27 August 1983

== Ladder ==
(P)	Premiers
	Qualified for finals

#	Team	P	W	L	D	PF	PA	%	Pts
1	North Melbourne	22	16	6	0	2789	2183	127.8	64
2	Hawthorn (P)	22	15	7	0	2675	2078	128.7	60
3	Fitzroy	22	15	7	0	2608	2059	126.7	60
4	Essendon	22	15	7	0	2664	2215	120.3	60
5	Carlton	22	13	9	0	2360	2244	105.2	52
6	Collingwood	22	12	10	0	2315	2247	103.0	48
7	Footscray	22	10	12	0	2102	2428	86.6	40
8	Melbourne	22	9	13	0	2220	2557	86.8	36
9	Geelong	22	8	14	0	1932	2197	87.9	32
10	Richmond	22	7	15	0	2124	2392	88.8	28
11	Sydney	22	7	15	0	2068	2670	77.5	28
12	St Kilda	22	5	17	0	2150	2737	78.6	20

Rules for classification: 1. premiership points; 2. percentage; 3. points for
Average score: 106.1
Source: AFL Tables

== Finals series ==
=== Finals week 1 ===
Home team	Score	Away team	Score	Venue	Attendance	Date
Essendon	17.12 (114)	Carlton	12.9 (81)	Waverley Park	65,881	Saturday, 3 September
Hawthorn	19.13 (127)	Fitzroy	19.9 (123)	MCG	58,288	Saturday, 3 September

=== Finals week 2 ===
Home team	Score	Away team	Score	Venue	Attendance	Date
North Melbourne	6.12 (48)	Hawthorn	13.10 (88)	Waverley Park	41,063	Saturday, 10 September
Fitzroy	12.14 (86)	Essendon	16.13 (109)	MCG	81,090	Saturday, 10 September

=== Preliminary final ===
Home team	Score	Away team	Score	Venue	Attendance	Date
North Melbourne	12.6 (78)	Essendon	25.14 (164)	Waverley Park	63,785	Saturday, 17 September

=== Grand final ===
Home team	Score	Away team	Score	Venue	Attendance	Date
Hawthorn	20.20 (140)	Essendon	8.9 (57)	MCG	110,332	Saturday, 24 September

== Season notes ==
- In Round 4, St Kilda played Paul Morwood, Jack Lynch and Silvio Foschini without their clearances from the Sydney Swans being finalised. Had they beaten Geelong, they would have forfeited the points under the laws at the time.
- North Melbourne's 150-point loss to Fitzroy in Round 13 more than doubled the previous biggest loss by a minor premier of 69 points, which had occurred in 1952 and 1974.
- In Fitzroy's Round 17 game with St Kilda, a record quarter aggregate of 19.7 (121) – Fitzroy 12.6 (78), St. Kilda 7.1 (43) – was kicked during the second quarter.
- In Round 19, Kevin Bartlett became the first player to play 400 VFL games, after having in Round 11 of 1981 become the first to reach 350 games.

== Awards ==
- The Brownlow Medal was awarded to Ross Glendinning of North Melbourne.
- The Coleman Medal was awarded to Bernie Quinlan of Fitzroy.
- The VFL Players Association MVP Award, now known as the Leigh Matthews Trophy, was awarded to Terry Daniher of Essendon.
- The Norm Smith Medal was awarded to Colin Robertson of Hawthorn.
- The "Wooden Spoon" was "awarded" to St Kilda.
- The under 19s premiership won by Melbourne
- The reserves premiership was won by Essendon. Essendon 19.14 (128) defeated Collingwood 15.9 (99) in the grand final, held as a curtain-raiser to the seniors Grand Final on 24 September.

== Sources ==
- 1983 VFL season at AFL Tables
- 1983 VFL season at Australian Football
