= List of North Melbourne Football Club players =

This is a list of North Melbourne Football Club players who have made one or more appearance in the Australian Football League (known as the Victorian Football League until 1990) and AFLW.

== North Melbourne Football Club players ==
Key
Order	Players are listed in order of debut
Seasons	Includes North Melbourne only careers and spans from the season of the player's debut to the year in which they played their final game for North Melbourne
Debut	Debuts are for VFL/AFL regular season and finals series matches only
Games Goals	Statistics are for VFL/AFL regular season and finals series matches only and are correct to the end of the 2026 AFL season and round 8 of the 2026 AFL Women's season.
^{^}	Currently listed players

== Men ==
=== 1920s ===
Debut Year	Shinboner	Player	Games	Goals	Years
1925	1	Harry Clapson	7	3	1925
1925	2	Jock Doherty	4	3	1925
1925	3	Wels Eicke	21	0	1925–1926
1925	4	Archie Giles	13	2	1925–1926
1925	5	Chris Gomez	10	0	1925
1925	6	Alf Goonan	7	12	1925–1926
1925	7	Harold Johnston	37	32	1925–1927
1925	8	Alf Lambe	58	2	1925–1928
1925	9	Johnny Lewis	150	142	1925–1927, 1929–1935
1925	10	Duncan Lindsay	27	31	1925–1926
1925	11	Curly Linton	30	2	1925–1927
1925	12	Jacky Lock	36	3	1925–1928
1925	13	Bill McIntosh	6	0	1925
1925	14	Fred Metcalf	39	68	1925–1927
1925	15	Bill Russ	59	16	1925–1928
1925	16	Billy Smith	12	1	1925–1926
1925	17	Tim Trevaskis	64	26	1925–1929
1925	18	Dave Walsh	47	0	1925–1927
1925	19	Frank Melville	13	3	1925, 1929
1925	20	Joe Kirkley	2	0	1925–1926
1925	21	Jack Lynch	62	57	1925–1927, 1932–1935
1925	22	Fred Rutley	11	21	1925, 1930
1925	23	Teddy Shorten	6	4	1925–1926
1925	24	Charlie Healy	81	23	1925–1930
1925	25	Allan McCasker	3	0	1925
1925	26	Lindsay Meeking	1	1	1925
1925	27	Joe Wood	13	29	1925–1926
1925	28	Harry Greensmith	2	0	1925
1925	29	Ray Harper	2	0	1925
1925	30	Gerry Britt	21	10	1925–1927
1925	31	Leo Dwyer	71	3	1925–1929, 1934–1935
1925	32	Don Watson	31	0	1925–1929
1925	33	Clarrie Nolan	44	31	1925–1928
1926	34	Gerry Donnelly	14	5	1926, 1930
1926	35	Harry Barnes	8	2	1926
1926	36	Joe Lovett	33	27	1926–1928
1926	37	Jack O'Sullivan	9	5	1926–1927
1926	38	Jack Nolan	9	10	1926
1926	39	Johnny Gregory	156	5	1926–1935
1926	40	George Bolt	16	0	1926–1927
1926	41	Jack Eudey	3	0	1926
1926	42	Joe Paul	14	5	1926–1930
1926	43	Arthur Hutchinson	4	2	1926
1926	44	Charles Cameron	122	19	1926–1934
1926	45	Roy Day	4	4	1926–1927
1926	46	Jack Sanders	1	0	1926
1927	47	Syd Barker Sr.	9	1	1927
1927	48	Tommy Jenkins	3	4	1927
1927	49	Arthur Lowe	41	2	1927–1929
1927	50	Max Pitchford	51	15	1927–1930
1927	51	Charlie Tyson	38	38	1927–1929
1927	52	George Morrissey Jr.	4	0	1927–1928
1927	53	Fred Coulsell	1	0	1927
1927	54	Billy Lynch	36	4	1927–1929
1927	55	Norm Davis	2	1	1927
1927	56	John Dowling	49	79	1927–1931
1927	57	Bill McDowell	11	7	1927–1928
1927	58	Bill Stevens	6	12	1927
1927	59	Bill McCabe	42	10	1927–1931
1927	60	Frank Donnellan	18	8	1927, 1931–1932
1927	61	Ed Bray	6	9	1927, 1929
1927	62	Jim Morton	1	0	1927
1927	63	Arthur Staveley	8	1	1927–1928
1928	64	Peter Brown	9	7	1928
1928	65	Frank Coutts	4	6	1928
1928	66	Jack Morrissey	29	0	1928–1930
1928	67	Laurie Murphy	15	3	1928–1929
1928	68	Lachlan Richards	2	1	1928
1928	69	Bob Smith	16	0	1928
1928	70	Tommy Dea	35	1	1928–1930
1928	71	Edgar Jones	2	0	1928
1928	72	Len McConnell	16	5	1928
1928	73	Orm Saunders	13	14	1928–1929
1928	74	Ben Kavanagh	22	35	1928–1929
1928	75	Teddy Briggs	14	13	1928–1930
1928	76	George Styles	1	0	1928
1928	77	Dick Wright	2	0	1928
1928	78	Norm Dugdell	6	8	1928–1929
1928	79	Artie Malberg	3	0	1928
1929	80	Joe Bruce	1	0	1929
1929	81	Percy Evans	2	0	1929
1929	82	Don Gibson	3	0	1929
1929	83	Neville Heffernan	6	4	1929–1930
1929	84	Arthur Mason	2	1	1929
1929	85	Claude Rowe	2	1	1929
1929	86	Jim Adamson	180	13	1929–1941
1929	87	Ted Clauscen	25	0	1929–1930
1929	88	George Dykes	8	1	1929–1930
1929	89	Bill Johnstone	3	0	1929
1929	90	Neal Thompson	1	0	1929
1929	91	Cliff Tyson	1	0	1929
1929	92	Ed Cooke	11	10	1929–1930, 1932
1929	93	Dave Nelson	7	2	1929
1929	94	Bob Oswald	5	1	1929
1929	95	Cyril Kemp	30	5	1929–1931
1929	96	Hughie Price	3	1	1929
1929	97	Dave Farrell	3	0	1929
1929	98	Frank Ludlow	3	5	1929
1929	99	Bill Campbell	2	0	1929
1929	100	Wally Carter	137	32	1929–1940
1929	101	John Thompson	14	1	1929–1930
1929	102	Gerry Tuite	4	0	1929

=== 1930s ===
Debut Year	Shinboner	Player	Games	Goals	Years
1930	103	Roy Atkins	14	4	1930
1930	104	Ray Clarke	1	0	1930
1930	105	Leo Credlin	1	0	1930
1930	106	Jim Heenan	8	1	1930
1930	107	Frank Holmes	3	0	1930
1930	108	George Jerram	77	10	1930–1932, 1934–1935
1930	109	Bob Mathews	58	32	1930–1934
1930	110	Bert Peters	17	3	1930–1931
1930	111	Mowbray Weir	19	10	1930–1931
1930	112	Jack Donovan	6	3	1930
1930	113	Frank Wells	37	4	1930, 1934–1935
1930	114	Fred Dean	5	2	1930
1930	115	Joe Knott	16	0	1930–1931
1930	116	Rupe Perrett	5	0	1930
1930	117	Alex Clarke	15	0	1930–1931, 1933
1930	118	Dick O'Shea	14	8	1930–1931
1930	119	Arthur Smith	2	0	1930
1930	120	Bill Spry	9	0	1930–1931
1930	121	Syd Barker Jr.	41	4	1930–1933
1930	122	Joe McElholum	8	2	1930–1931
1930	123	Clarrie Semmel	4	0	1930
1930	124	Harold Davidson	4	0	1930
1930	125	Wal McGrath	2	1	1930
1930	126	Hector Moir	12	6	1930–1931
1930	127	Paul Clarke	1	0	1930
1930	128	Arthur Morley	5	0	1930–1931
1931	129	Ted Cusack	16	5	1931–1933
1931	130	Charlie Gaudion	77	9	1931–1937
1931	131	Len Hooke	9	13	1931
1931	132	Neville Huggins	86	21	1931–1935
1931	133	Ray Jackson	30	2	1931–1932
1931	134	Jim Kennedy	1	0	1931
1931	135	Bill Brodie	6	0	1931, 1934
1931	136	Ben Whittam	34	6	1931–1933, 1937–1938
1931	137	Dave Ferguson	7	0	1931
1931	138	Les Jones	2	0	1931
1931	139	Dave Holliday	3	1	1931
1931	140	Frank Crapper	27	56	1931, 1935–1939
1931	141	Harold Hooke	11	0	1931
1931	142	George Peters	6	3	1931
1931	143	Steve Bloomer	7	4	1931
1931	144	Les Brennan	11	11	1931
1931	145	Bill Purcell	10	6	1931
1931	146	Selwyn Baker	37	42	1931–1934
1931	147	Jack Wrout	53	52	1931–1936
1931	148	Bill Lewis	4	0	1931–1932
1932	149	Les Allen	41	103	1932–1934
1932	150	Thomas Leather	16	11	1932–1933
1932	151	Max Millen	8	7	1932
1932	152	Jack Smith	62	26	1932–1937
1932	153	Dick Taylor	40	25	1932–1934
1932	154	Jack Welsh	12	2	1932
1932	155	Arthur Batchelor	3	0	1932
1932	156	Tom Fitzmaurice	54	196	1932–1935
1932	157	Ted Llewellyn	50	31	1932–1935
1932	158	Frank Pearce	20	1	1932–1933
1932	159	Jack Patterson	31	27	1932, 1934–1935
1932	160	Ken Bracken	1	0	1932
1932	161	Hugh Carroll	9	1	1932
1932	162	Tom Dunne	8	0	1932–1933
1932	163	Dinny Dowd	2	0	1932
1932	164	Jack Webb	1	0	1932
1932	165	Frank Morgan	2	0	1932
1932	166	Johnny Edwards	5	0	1932–1933
1933	167	Jim Bicknell	57	7	1933–1934, 1936–1938
1933	168	Jack Gaudion	3	0	1933, 1935
1933	169	Jack Haskett	3	0	1933
1933	170	Jack Diprose	19	0	1933–1934
1933	171	Ted Wintle	1	0	1933
1933	172	Roy Pope	9	4	1933
1933	173	Len Johnson	5	3	1933
1933	174	Leo Tyrrell	22	7	1933–1939
1933	175	Ted Ellis	85	41	1933–1939
1933	176	Bert Clarke	4	2	1933
1933	177	Charlie Skinner	114	7	1933–1942
1933	178	Trevor Wallace	13	0	1933–1934
1933	179	Jim Bolwell	1	0	1933
1933	180	Geoff Fox	1	0	1933
1933	181	Dick May	9	4	1933–1934
1934	182	Alf Egan	15	7	1934–1935
1934	183	Lloyd Johnson	40	32	1934–1938
1934	184	Ray Mead	12	0	1934
1934	185	Horrie Stevens	1	0	1934
1934	186	Wally Guy	8	4	1934
1934	187	Keith Long	18	6	1934–1935
1934	188	Tom Sleightholm	1	0	1934
1934	189	Len Brown	3	0	1934
1934	190	Keith Chamberlain	2	0	1934
1934	191	Ken McKernan	3	0	1934–1935
1934	192	Dudley Cassidy	29	66	1935–1937
1934	193	Ernie Hammond	4	0	1935
1934	194	Jack Anderson	59	10	1935–1939
1934	195	Jim Jeffers	2	3	1935
1934	196	Bill Findlay	168	352	1935–1945
1935	197	Charlie Bartling	13	1	1935–1936
1935	198	Percy Purcell	3	1	1935
1935	199	Beres Reilly	8	2	1935–1936
1935	200	Cairo Dixon	18	0	1935–1936
1935	201	Jock Cordner	88	8	1935–1941
1935	202	Clem McCann	2	0	1935
1935	203	Bill Jones	10	9	1935–1936
1935	204	Mick Maroney	1	0	1935
1935	205	Jack Parker	1	0	1935
1935	206	Harry Hardiman	6	5	1935, 1938
1935	207	Jimmy Tate	2	2	1935
1935	208	Mo Shapir	3	2	1935
1935	209	Des Rowan	1	1	1935
1936	210	Tom Brooker	2	2	1936
1936	211	Dave Burke	20	8	1936–1937, 1939
1936	212	Roy Deller	30	6	1936–1937, 1944
1936	213	Arthur Duncan	3	1	1936
1936	214	Horrie Farmer	19	23	1936–1937
1936	215	Roy Sitch	63	2	1936–1940
1936	216	Reg Taylor	3	0	1936
1936	217	Bernie Guthrie	16	9	1936–1937
1936	218	Alf Hacker	24	0	1936, 1938, 1943
1936	219	Don Kemp	99	15	1936–1943, 1946–1947
1936	220	Ron McLeod	28	13	1936–1938
1936	221	Garmah Jones	1	0	1936
1936	222	Len Smith	13	4	1936–1937
1936	223	Bill Montgomery	61	3	1936–1942
1936	224	Jim Steigenberger	9	3	1936–1937
1936	225	Frank Neenan	5	2	1936
1936	226	Herb Jones	65	5	1936–1944
1936	227	Joe Rogers	17	1	1936–1937
1936	228	Alan Crawford	77	39	1936–1938, 1943–1945, 1948–1949
1937	229	Roy Lyons	12	6	1937–1938, 1940
1937	230	Eddie Morcom	75	18	1937–1939, 1944–1945
1937	231	Syd Dyer	155	321	1937–1947
1937	232	Frank Penney	9	7	1937
1937	233	Frank Stubbs	66	17	1937–1941, 1945–1946
1937	234	Stewart Anderson	14	20	1937–1938
1937	235	Mick McFarlane	43	4	1937–1940
1937	236	Col Mitchell	12	10	1937–1939
1937	237	Sel Murray	108	411	1937–1944, 1948
1937	238	Harry Green	46	28	1937–1942, 1946
1937	239	Bruce Gregory	1	0	1937
1937	240	Cliff Hough	1	0	1937
1937	241	George Kennedy	80	124	1937–1942, 1946–1948
1938	242	Keith Forbes	31	50	1938–1939
1938	243	Les Jacobs	3	0	1938
1938	244	John Baker	28	4	1938–1940
1938	245	Ossy Parks	64	4	1938–1942
1938	246	Chris Lamborn	5	0	1938
1938	247	Dally O'Brien	137	63	1938–1949
1938	248	Bill Jory	1	1	1938
1938	249	Allen Turner	6	4	1938–1939
1938	250	Jim Stewart	35	19	1938–1941
1938	251	Ron Rann	6	0	1938–1939
1939	252	Jack Harrison	92	20	1939–1947
1939	253	Neil Jeffrey	6	2	1939
1939	254	Arnold Maltby	2	0	1939
1939	255	Bill Wells	14	4	1939–1940, 1943–1944
1939	256	Tom Roulent	77	17	1939–1941, 1944–1945
1939	257	George Coward	13	1	1939–1941
1939	258	Reg Ryan	66	0	1939–1940, 1946–1950
1939	259	Charlie Pierce	1	0	1939
1939	260	Eric Clark	2	1	1939
1939	261	Geoff Dalley	2	1	1939

=== 1940s ===
Debut Year	Shinboner	Player	Games	Goals	Years
1940	262	Jock McCorkell	167	5	1940–1942, 1946–1953
1940	263	Jack Ryan	9	2	1940–1941
1940	264	Len Thomas	6	9	1940
1940	265	Laurie Davies	9	3	1940
1940	266	Merv Bolger	3	0	1940
1940	267	Vin Hogan	7	0	1940, 1942
1940	268	Norm Tomkinson	2	2	1940
1940	269	Syd Slater	39	27	1940–1945
1940	270	Col Spratling	18	7	1940–1941, 1943
1940	271	Geoff Willis	36	3	1940–1944
1940	272	Ray Bromley	2	0	1940
1940	273	Vin Casey	8	2	1940–1943
1940	274	Neil Hasell	2	0	1940
1940	275	Trevor Jones	1	1	1940
1940	276	Ray Wynd	4	3	1940–1941
1940	277	Jack Kenny	1	0	1940
1941	278	Dick Abikhair	60	2	1941–1945
1941	279	Bill Dunn	3	0	1941
1941	280	Jim Reid	12	3	1941–1942
1941	281	Harold Arthur	9	2	1941, 1944–1945
1941	282	Dick Chirgwin	15	2	1941–1943
1941	283	Brian Geary	11	1	1941
1941	284	Les Foote	134	105	1941–1951
1941	285	Ron Howell	9	2	1941–1942
1941	286	Jack Allister	58	54	1941–1945
1941	287	Les Crosbie	44	1	1941–1944
1941	288	Bill Sharp	3	0	1941–1942
1941	289	George Brock	4	3	1941
1941	290	Bill Gerrand	2	1	1941
1941	291	Syd Jackson	4	0	1941–1942
1941	292	Jack Matthews	3	1	1941
1941	293	Alec Stewart	3	1	1941–1942
1942	294	Teddy Long	10	7	1942, 1946
1942	295	Ron Smith	33	1	1942–1944
1942	296	Ian McTaggart	4	5	1942
1942	297	Joe Foden	3	0	1942
1942	298	Keith Miller	7	0	1942
1942	299	Allan Montgomery	3	0	1942
1942	300	Frank Anderson	8	5	1942, 1944
1942	301	Dan Kearney	3	0	1942
1942	302	Alf Crump	84	83	1942–1948
1942	303	Ray Bamford	2	0	1942
1942	304	Jack Bennett	26	1	1942–1946
1942	305	Lawrie Blades	2	0	1942
1942	306	Gordon Green	1	0	1942
1942	307	Kevin Hurley	2	1	1942
1942	308	John Lander	2	2	1942
1942	309	Charlie Peterson	1	2	1942
1942	310	Arch Hamilton	1	0	1942
1943	311	Jack Boldiston	7	0	1943
1943	312	Harry Chalmers	10	0	1943
1943	313	Kevin Dynon	149	83	1943–1954
1943	314	Jack Moran	30	1	1943–1945
1943	315	Dick Day	2	0	1943
1943	316	Ted Wellington	1	0	1943
1943	317	Alby Williams	3	0	1943
1943	318	Lance Dobson	21	6	1943–1944
1943	319	Basil Bretherton	4	0	1943
1943	320	Phil Dunstone	13	15	1943–1944
1943	321	Syd McGain	12	0	1943, 1945
1943	322	Stan Attenborough	8	0	1943–1944
1943	323	Ron Cooper	2	1	1943
1943	324	George Garlick	8	0	1943–1944
1943	325	Jim Patterson	25	20	1943–1944, 1946–1947
1943	326	Vince Cross	4	0	1943–1945
1943	327	Mick Pullen	4	1	1943, 1946
1944	328	Don Condon	131	218	1944–1951
1944	329	Jack Hunter	7	13	1944–1945
1944	330	Keith McKenzie	130	12	1944–1951
1944	331	Allan Wilson	1	0	1944
1944	332	Herbie Wood	10	1	1944–1945
1944	333	Eric Haggis	4	0	1944
1944	334	Fred Fairweather	54	14	1944–1946
1944	335	Ken Watkins	5	0	1944
1944	336	Alf Clay	31	16	1944–1946
1944	337	Ted Thomas	11	0	1944–1945
1944	338	Ted Turner	16	1	1944–1946
1944	339	Harold Daly	2	0	1944
1944	340	Cam Bogie	19	2	1944–1945
1944	341	Clive Smith	2	0	1944
1944	342	Ted Jarrard	130	11	1944–1953
1945	343	Alfie Evans	3	0	1945
1945	344	Bill Hager	3	0	1945
1945	345	Jack Crane	18	0	1945–1946
1945	346	Jack Doherty	14	0	1945
1945	347	Jim Malone	102	24	1945–1952
1945	348	Pat Dalton	1	0	1945
1945	349	Leo Francis	78	11	1945–1951
1945	350	Pat Kelly	104	4	1945, 1948–1955
1945	351	Roy Quinn	19	5	1945–1946
1945	352	Tom Crane	1	0	1945
1946	353	Dick Flynn	1	0	1946
1946	354	Jack Sexton	4	1	1946
1946	355	Bob Drummond	5	0	1946
1946	356	Ted Atkinson	3	0	1946
1946	357	Pat Gill	2	0	1946
1946	358	Ted Larsen	72	0	1946, 1948–1949, 1952–1954
1946	359	Stan Radloff	60	6	1946–1950
1946	360	Milton Clark	2	0	1946
1946	361	Frank Connellan	29	10	1946–1947
1946	362	Jack Norris	1	0	1946
1946	363	Ron Moran	1	0	1946
1946	364	Les Reeves	116	8	1946–1953
1946	365	Ted Bourke	5	0	1946–1947
1946	366	Dick Molloy	19	3	1946–1947
1946	367	Wally Perry	2	0	1946
1946	368	Joe Malone	10	2	1946–1947
1946	369	Bill McMaster	3	0	1946
1946	370	Tom Hayes	2	0	1946
1946	371	Jackie Huggard	7	3	1946
1946	372	Jim Kirby	1	0	1946
1946	373	Allan Maas	15	1	1946–1948
1946	374	Frank Stephens	14	16	1946–1947
1946	375	Ron Allan	14	4	1946,1948–1949
1946	376	Frank Steane	1	3	1946
1947	377	Don Coulton	6	0	1947
1947	378	Fred Hill	2	0	1947
1947	379	Harold Winberg	7	0	1947
1947	380	Jock Lineen	53	1	1947,1949–1954
1947	381	Terry Walsh	27	8	1947–1948
1947	382	Jack Lyons	24	0	1947–1948
1947	383	Chris Carroll	13	18	1947–1948
1947	384	Harry Somerville	6	8	1947
1947	385	George Kokkin	19	1	1947, 1949–1950
1947	386	Neville Stibbard	6	1	1947–1948
1947	387	Maurie Edwards	3	0	1947
1947	388	Kevin Slattery	8	2	1947
1947	389	Frank Jeeves	65	25	1947–1952, 1954
1947	390	Graham Dunscombe	5	1	1947
1947	391	Kevin Hayes	5	0	1947
1947	392	Les Hill	2	0	1947
1947	393	Jim Kuhl	10	0	1947–1948
1947	394	Col Thornton	59	19	1947–1953
1947	395	Rob McEwen	1	0	1947
1947	396	Brian Williamson	1	0	1947
1947	397	Gerald Marchesi	92	112	1947–1954
1948	398	Claude Curtin	4	7	1948
1948	399	John Reeves	102	36	1948–1955
1948	400	Richard Maddocks	5	3	1948
1948	401	Jock Spencer	153	475	1948–1957
1948	402	Lionel Upton	5	1	1948
1948	403	Jack Hedley	31	15	1948–1950
1948	404	Doug Johnson	20	3	1948–1949
1948	405	Vic Lawrence	121	21	1948–1955
1948	406	Bill Harvey	2	0	1948
1948	407	Roy Eliason	5	0	1948–1949
1948	408	Gordon Yea	2	2	1948
1949	409	Jim Bradford	9	8	1949
1949	410	Ernie O'Rourke	9	6	1949
1949	411	Eric Parkes	74	2	1949–1955
1949	412	Laurie Shipp	33	3	1949–1951
1949	413	Lindsay Baglin	5	2	1949
1949	414	Tim Robb	34	51	1949–1951
1949	415	Les Mogg	75	41	1949–1954
1949	416	Kevin McMahon	119	11	1949–1951, 1953–1959
1949	417	Bob Brooker	107	41	1949–1956

=== 1950s ===
Debut Year	Shinboner	Player	Games	Goals	Years
1950	418	Kevin Smith	40	48	1950–1955
1950	419	Alec Albiston	7	6	1950
1950	420	Bill Milroy	7	0	1950–1951
1950	421	Bryan Martyn	73	16	1950–1951, 1953–1958
1951	422	Jack Clark	2	0	1951
1951	423	Jack Cuffe	3	0	1951, 1953
1951	424	Gerry Bahen	8	1	1951
1951	425	Bill Bourke	5	0	1951
1951	426	Ron Fletcher	21	0	1951–1952
1951	427	Oscar Skalberg	9	1	1951–1952
1951	428	Jack Edwards	114	1	1951–1959
1951	429	Percy Johnson	52	4	1951–1955
1951	430	Bill Thomas	4	0	1951–1952
1951	431	Neil Doolan	103	18	1951–1960
1952	432	Allen Aylett	220	311	1952–1964
1952	433	John Brady	118	44	1952–1959
1952	434	Mick Grambeau	56	53	1952–1955
1952	435	Laurie Icke	57	0	1952–1955
1952	436	Jack O'Halloran	75	56	1952–1956
1952	437	Kevin Easton	28	29	1952–1956
1952	438	Peter Hamilton	55	0	1952–1957
1952	439	Noel Alford	24	38	1952–1953
1952	440	Kevin Corcoran	1	0	1952
1953	441	Brian Johnson	44	6	1953–1956
1953	442	Ron Walsh	14	1	1953, 1955, 1957
1953	443	Reg Grant	16	8	1953–1955
1954	444	Len Templar	60	54	1954–1957
1954	445	Garry English	71	3	1954–1959
1954	446	Al Mantello	107	25	1954–1962
1954	447	Tom McLean	9	1	1954–1956
1954	448	Gerald Eastmure	121	129	1954–1961
1954	449	Graham Walker	1	0	1954
1954	450	Roy Files	10	12	1954, 1956
1954	451	James Russell	34	3	1954–1958
1954	452	Ian Jones	6	0	1954–1955
1955	453	Peter Curtis	2	1	1955
1955	454	Keith Goullet	1	1	1955
1955	455	Jack Lawrence	9	3	1955, 1957
1955	456	Bobby Burt	11	2	1955–1957
1955	457	John Joiner	11	0	1955–1956
1955	458	Peter Marchesi	3	0	1955
1955	459	Max Ritchie	55	7	1955–1960
1955	460	John Dugdale	248	358	1955–1970
1955	461	Bill Reddick	12	0	1955–1956
1955	462	John Wymer	2	0	1955
1955	463	Norm Dean	30	6	1955–1958
1955	464	Norm Neeson	5	0	1955–1956
1955	465	Brian O'Halloran	9	1	1955, 1958
1955	466	Bill Barton	2	2	1955–1956
1955	467	John Ford	13	2	1955–1956
1955	468	Ron James	7	5	1955–1957
1956	469	Keith Batchelor	21	0	1956–1957
1956	470	Charlie Marendaz	6	0	1956
1956	471	Peter O'Sullivan	24	7	1956–1958
1956	472	Noel Teasdale	178	71	1956–1967
1956	473	Ken Dean	159	17	1956–1967
1956	474	Dal Dozzi	4	0	1956
1956	475	Fred Macquire	15	2	1956–1959
1956	476	Ian Crewes	2	0	1956
1956	477	Laurie Dwyer	201	34	1956–1958, 1960–1964, 1966–1970
1956	478	Colin Crampton	6	1	1956–1957
1956	479	Keith Wilson	2	0	1956
1956	480	Des Tobin	1	0	1956
1957	481	Bill McCabe	13	0	1957–1959
1957	482	Ray Murphy	20	3	1957–1958
1957	483	Tom Quade	3	0	1957–1958
1957	484	Keith Robertson	69	9	1957–1958, 1960–1963
1957	485	Merv Williams	7	4	1957–1958
1957	486	Rod McKindlay	5	0	1957–1959
1957	487	Peter Schofield	50	111	1957–1960
1957	488	Bob Wiltshire	36	4	1957–1959
1957	489	Kevin Meade	4	0	1957–1958
1957	490	Ivor Witnish	3	0	1957
1957	491	Tom Pelly	10	3	1957–1958
1957	492	Vin Bourke	1	0	1957
1957	493	Michael Gaudion	152	44	1957–1967
1957	494	Bob Pattinson	1	0	1957
1958	495	Ken Fyffe	37	3	1958–1961
1958	496	Frank Stephenson	30	6	1958–1960
1958	497	John Waddington	132	30	1958–1966
1958	498	Brian Cahill	23	10	1958–1961
1958	499	Frank Galle	19	2	1958–1960
1958	500	Barrie Somerville	3	1	1958
1959	501	Noel Anderson	1	0	1959
1959	502	Alan Carr	66	13	1959–1966
1959	503	Peter Dow	18	8	1959–1961
1959	504	Don Palmer	50	23	1959–1964
1959	505	Brian Turner	43	0	1959–1961
1959	506	Jock O'Brien	33	0	1959–1961
1959	507	Jim Little	7	2	1959
1959	508	Robin Poole	28	0	1959–1961
1959	509	Mick Cooke	16	5	1959–1960
1959	510	Barry Cheatley	81	3	1959–1964
1959	511	John Jenkins	71	44	1959–1964
1959	512	Warren Mercer	1	0	1959
1959	513	Ron Mills	8	0	1959–1960

=== 1960s ===
Debut Year	Shinboner	Player	Games	Goals	Years
1960	514	Derek Cowen	30	1	1960–1962
1960	515	John Dalgleish	9	1	1960–1961
1960	516	Barry Goring	12	0	1960
1960	517	Graham Ryan	43	5	1960–1962, 1965
1960	518	Fred Robinson	15	3	1960–1962
1960	519	Dennis Railton	35	2	1960–1963
1960	520	Paul Rowe	15	0	1960–1962
1960	521	Barry Kelly	16	0	1960–1962
1960	522	Graeme Taggart	1	0	1960
1960	523	Adrian Perry	41	0	1960–1965
1960	524	Ken Snell	56	21	1960–1965
1960	525	Daryl O'Brien	135	8	1960, 1962–1969
1961	526	Keith Hollands	2	0	1961
1961	527	Dave Meehan	1	0	1961
1961	528	Michael Pickering	6	8	1961–1962
1961	529	Tom Carey	1	0	1961
1961	530	Ian Hughes	11	7	1961–1962
1961	531	Adrian Beer	4	0	1961
1961	532	Rod Ward	15	12	1961–1962
1961	533	Graeme Saunders	10	0	1961–1962
1961	534	Mike Darby	9	0	1961–1962
1961	535	Bob Hancock	6	2	1961–1963
1961	536	Ian McGregor	2	0	1961, 1964
1961	537	Frank Goode	73	107	1961–1967
1962	538	Barney Howard	2	1	1962
1962	539	John Ibrahim	85	50	1962–1968
1962	540	Bernie McCarthy	148	80	1962–1971
1962	541	Peter Steward	126	10	1962–1964, 1966–1970
1962	542	Ron Fitzpatrick	1	0	1962
1962	543	Bill Serong	16	8	1962
1962	544	Doug Woolley	6	0	1962
1962	545	Barry Allan	61	18	1962–1967
1962	546	Barry McAuliffe	41	0	1962–1966
1962	547	Bob Andrews	10	15	1962–1963
1962	548	Murray Clapham	1	1	1962
1962	549	Brian Wicks	5	5	1962
1963	550	Tom Allison	106	61	1963–1970
1963	551	Mike Delanty	54	12	1963–1966
1963	552	Viv Peterson	8	8	1963–1964
1963	553	Bob Stewart	7	0	1963
1963	554	Peter Agrums	11	4	1963–1964
1963	555	Terry Benton	77	3	1963–1969
1963	556	Graeme O'Donnell	16	18	1963–1964
1963	557	Bob Goode	20	0	1963–1966
1963	558	Bob Wright	1	0	1963
1963	559	Roland Crosby	10	3	1963–1964
1963	560	Maurie Wood	97	77	1963–1971
1964	561	Ken Delaland	1	0	1964
1964	562	Dick Hallo	8	0	1964
1964	563	Barry Harrison	1	0	1964
1964	564	Bob Pascoe	53	37	1964–1967
1964	565	Frank Pomeroy	10	0	1964
1964	566	Arthur Karanicolas	69	55	1964–1968
1964	567	Peter Davison	4	0	1964
1964	568	Mick Dowdle	98	89	1964–1971
1965	569	Bert Johnson	31	5	1965–1968
1965	570	Geoff Jones	3	0	1965
1965	571	Ross Price	3	3	1965
1965	572	Dennis McGrath	36	6	1965–1968
1965	573	Tony Thiessen	4	0	1965
1965	574	Gavan McCarthy	2	0	1965
1965	575	Rod Dell	18	9	1965–1969
1965	576	Ray Davies	25	1	1965–1968
1965	577	Bob Hirst	3	1	1965
1965	578	Barry Gavin	6	2	1965–1966
1965	579	Dave Rogers	9	2	1965–1966
1966	580	Mike Quade	16	9	1966–1968
1966	581	Ray Johnston	60	13	1966–1970
1966	582	Noel McKernan	11	1	1966–1968
1967	583	Gary Farrant	138	88	1967–1971, 1973–1975
1967	584	Barry Goodingham	158	47	1967–1975
1967	585	Barry Pascoe	15	1	1967
1967	586	Ian Thompson	17	29	1967–1969
1967	587	Mick Evans	14	22	1967–1968
1967	588	Mick Howell	53	15	1967–1970
1967	589	Michael Redenbach	59	40	1967–1973
1967	590	Denis Pagan	120	5	1967–1974
1967	591	Ray Taylor	80	26	1967–1972
1967	592	Reg Sanders	7	8	1967, 1969–1970
1967	593	Garry Cameron	1	0	1967
1967	594	Ken Hill	2	0	1967
1967	595	Len Peterson	8	0	1967–1968
1967	596	Les Cameron	4	0	1967–1968
1967	597	John Scholes	30	35	1967–1971
1968	598	Peter Chisnall	80	14	1968–1970, 1974–1976
1968	599	Doug Farrant	70	110	1968–1971, 1973
1968	600	Rod Hughes	3	0	1968
1968	601	Brian Backhouse	6	2	1968
1968	602	Michael Gargan	3	2	1968
1968	603	Barry Leslie	4	1	1968
1968	604	Graham Heal	5	0	1968
1968	605	Sam Kekovich	124	228	1968–1976
1968	606	Ken Montgomery	189	2	1968–1981
1968	607	Robert Peterson	79	109	1968, 1970–1974
1968	608	Kevin Sykes	3	0	1968
1968	609	Jeff Hopgood	42	18	1968–1973
1968	610	Kerry Haywood	55	5	1968–1972
1969	611	Geoff Bryant	45	16	1969–1971
1969	612	Lindsay Jacob	2	2	1969
1969	613	David Pretty	58	12	1969–1973
1969	614	Rod Elliott	15	9	1969–1971
1969	615	John Duthie	11	5	1969–1972
1969	616	Noel Fincher	15	0	1969–1970
1969	617	Frank Dimattina	14	16	1969–1970
1969	618	David Dench	275	29	1969–1984
1969	619	Dick Ivey	1	0	1969
1969	620	Brian Neal	5	10	1969–1970

=== 1970s ===
Debut Year	Shinboner	Player	Games	Goals	Years
1970	621	Barry Cable	115	133	1970, 1974–1977
1970	622	Wolfgang Dietrich	5	0	1970
1970	623	Frank Gumbleton	147	19	1970–1979
1970	624	John Perry	57	26	1970–1974
1970	625	Phil Ryan	106	56	1970–1976
1970	626	Alan Bloomfield	13	7	1970–1971
1970	627	Paul Feltham	128	78	1970–1976
1970	628	Brian Devitt	7	1	1970
1970	629	Ross Beale	9	0	1970–1971
1970	630	Glenn Joseph	40	12	1970–1973
1971	631	Keith Greig	294	48	1971–1985
1971	632	Athol Hodgetts	9	15	1971–1972
1971	633	Rob Smith	48	48	1971–1977
1971	634	Vin Doolan	45	30	1971–1974
1971	635	Brian Mulvihill	24	25	1971–1972
1971	636	Gary Cowton	151	35	1971–1978, 1983–1984
1971	637	Ross Henshaw	167	11	1971–1983
1971	638	Leo Groenewegen	5	2	1971
1971	639	Brian Hall	11	0	1971–1972
1971	640	Phil Baker	97	116	1971–1975, 1977–1979
1971	641	Stan Mitchell	18	10	1971–1972
1971	642	Bill Nunn	24	2	1971–1973
1971	643	Ian Lasslett	2	0	1971
1972	644	Arnold Briedis	161	279	1972–1983
1972	645	John Douglas	12	8	1972, 1975–1976
1972	646	Russell Muir	40	6	1972–1975
1972	647	Mark Dawson	59	58	1972–1978
1972	648	Brian Symes	2	0	1972
1972	649	Neil Brown	2	0	1972
1972	650	Michael Hawking	3	5	1972
1972	651	Peter Robinson	9	1	1972
1972	652	Ron Montgomery	1	0	1972
1972	653	Phil Doherty	11	19	1972–1973
1973	654	Barry Davis	71	54	1973–1975
1973	655	John Rantall	70	2	1973–1975
1973	656	Wayne Schimmelbusch	306	354	1973–1987
1973	657	Doug Wade	59	223	1973–1975
1973	658	Darryl Sutton	91	65	1973, 1976–1980
1973	659	Mick Nolan	107	40	1973–1980
1973	660	John Burns	95	68	1973–1976, 1978
1973	661	Dick Michalczyk	24	3	1973–1975
1973	662	John White	1	0	1973
1973	663	David Craig	1	0	1973
1973	664	Michael Stilo	1	0	1973
1974	665	Brad Smith	24	12	1974–1975
1974	666	Malcolm Blight	178	444	1974–1982
1974	667	Peter Taylor	1	0	1974
1974	668	John Moylan	30	1	1974–1978
1974	669	Dennis Munari	13	1	1974–1977
1974	670	Shane Zantuck	5	3	1974–1976
1975	671	Graham Melrose	111	138	1975–1979
1975	672	Steven Icke	120	33	1975–1981
1975	673	Brent Crosswell	76	108	1975–1979
1975	674	John Byrne	98	71	1975–1982
1976	675	Terry Moore	40	16	1976–1977
1976	676	Paul O'Donoghue	1	0	1976
1976	677	Robert Briedis	9	0	1976–1978
1976	678	Gary Gray	2	0	1976
1976	679	Peter Keenan	51	18	1976–1978
1976	680	Colin Seery	2	3	1976
1976	681	John Frazer	10	27	1976–1977
1976	682	Bill Nettlefold	51	22	1976–1979
1976	683	Adrian Gallagher	1	0	1976
1976	684	Xavier Tanner	100	68	1976–1983
1976	685	Roy Ramsay	123	11	1976–1981, 1983–1986
1977	686	John Cassin	78	83	1977–1981
1977	687	Tony May	2	0	1977
1977	688	Glen Scanlon	4	0	1977
1977	689	Stan Alves	40	14	1977–1979
1977	690	Kerry Good	74	150	1977–1983
1977	691	Stephen McCann	226	201	1977–1988
1977	692	Mark Williams	4	0	1977–1978
1977	693	Alan Jarrott	79	31	1977–1981
1977	694	Maurice Boyse	50	50	1977–1981
1977	695	Craig Davis	10	20	1977–1978
1978	696	Ross Glendinning	190	214	1978–1986
1978	697	Daryl Schimmelbusch	47	27	1978–1981
1978	698	Brendan Burnett	6	0	1978
1978	699	Ray Huppatz	19	21	1978, 1980
1978	700	Doug Smith	54	17	1978–1983
1978	701	Roger Podolczak	15	13	1978–1981
1978	702	Daryl Cumming	1	0	1978
1978	703	Stephen Easton	31	31	1978–1981
1978	704	John Law	219	9	1978–1989
1978	705	Glenn Payne	13	7	1978–1981
1979	706	Kevin Bryant	58	38	1979–1984
1979	707	Graham Cornes	5	10	1979
1979	708	Gary Dempsey	122	39	1979–1984
1979	709	Russell Ebert	25	15	1979
1979	710	Shane Bond	9	8	1979–1980
1979	711	John Murphy	9	8	1979–1980

=== 1980s ===
Debut Year	Shinboner	Player	Games	Goals	Years
1980	712	Michael Reeves	23	21	1980–1981
1980	713	Mario Turco	9	9	1980, 1982
1980	714	Brian Wilson	39	17	1980–1981
1980	715	Rodney Wright	22	15	1980–1982
1980	716	Danny Murphy	1	0	1980
1981	717	Kym Hodgeman	91	133	1981–1985
1981	718	Phil Kelly	61	42	1981–1985
1981	719	Peter Spencer	24	32	1981–1982
1981	720	Kevin McGuire	18	1	1981–1985
1981	721	Darryl Henderson	11	0	1981–1982
1981	722	Peter Jonas	82	115	1981, 1983–1988
1981	723	Andrew Demetriou	103	47	1981–1987
1981	724	Glenn Dugdale	23	6	1981–1984
1981	725	Steve Goulding	2	2	1981
1981	726	Dean Dugdale	30	12	1981–1985
1981	727	John Holt	71	78	1981–1988
1981	728	Peter Smith	36	1	1981–1986
1982	729	Bruce Abernethy	43	21	1982–1983
1982	730	Craig Holden	29	2	1982–1983
1982	731	Jim Krakouer	134	229	1982–1989
1982	732	Phil Krakouer	141	224	1982–1989
1982	733	Graeme Atkins	61	39	1982–1984, 1986
1982	734	Phil Carman	13	27	1982
1982	735	Donald McDonald	155	165	1982–1992
1982	736	Brad Nimmo	13	0	1982–1983
1983	737	Tony Furey	41	29	1983–1985
1983	738	Ian Fairley	217	149	1983–1996
1983	739	Stephen Buckley	2	1	1983
1983	740	Brendan Ryan	17	18	1983, 1985–1986
1983	741	Jon Collins	24	9	1983–1985
1984	742	Ian Dunstan	6	4	1984
1984	743	Paul Johnson	5	2	1984
1984	744	Grant Thomas	7	1	1984
1984	745	David Dwyer	72	37	1984–1991
1984	746	Mark Lisle	37	14	1984–1989
1984	747	Angelo Petraglia	5	5	1984
1984	748	Craig Brittain	5	2	1984
1984	749	Ross Smith	224	36	1984–1996
1984	750	Darren Steele	119	31	1984–1992
1984	751	Peter Densley	11	4	1984
1984	752	Bill Berry	12	0	1984–1985
1984	753	Brendan Mutimer	7	3	1984
1984	754	Michael Passmore	42	1	1984–1988
1984	755	Matthew Larkin	172	143	1984–1993
1984	756	Tim Harrington	20	2	1984–1986
1984	757	Peter German	185	201	1984–1994
1984	758	Mark Arceri	70	102	1984–1990
1985	759	Steve Hickey	37	2	1985–1988
1985	760	Rick Norman	12	10	1985–1986
1985	761	Rod Lewis	1	1	1985
1985	762	Rohan Robertson	26	7	1985–1988
1985	763	Shane Robertson	4	1	1985
1985	764	Darren Crocker	165	119	1985–1998
1985	765	Doug Koop	5	4	1985–1986
1985	766	Jamie Stevenson	16	8	1985–1989
1985	767	Paul Spargo	81	109	1985–1992
1986	768	David Ackerly	53	5	1986–1989
1986	769	Darren Harris	51	28	1986–1991
1986	770	Jason Love	45	69	1986–1989
1986	771	David Ceglar	7	2	1986–1987
1986	772	John McCarthy	92	101	1986–1992
1986	773	Ben Buckley	74	15	1986–1993
1986	774	Robert Saggers	3	5	1986
1987	775	Dale Holmes	3	0	1987
1987	776	John Mossop	37	15	1987–1988
1987	777	Brett Allison	219	276	1987–1999
1987	778	Dean McRae	81	25	1987–1992
1987	779	Shaun Smith	47	38	1987–1992
1987	780	Paul Bryce	48	26	1987–1990
1987	781	Alastair Clarkson	93	61	1987–1995
1987	782	Robert Kerr	6	0	1987–1988
1987	783	Craig Sholl	235	165	1987–2000
1987	784	Mark Hepburn	56	29	1987–1990
1987	785	Jeff Chandler	50	4	1987–1992
1988	786	Kevin Hughes	1	0	1988
1988	787	Michael Murphy	3	0	1988
1988	788	Wayne Schwass	184	97	1988–1997
1988	789	Mick Martyn	287	16	1988–2002
1988	790	Mark O'Donoghue	2	2	1988
1988	791	John Longmire	200	511	1988–1999
1988	792	Darren Ogier	2	3	1988
1988	793	Anthony Rock	178	138	1988–1998
1988	794	Brenton Harris	2	0	1988
1988	795	Brett MacKenzie	1	0	1988
1988	796	Jose Romero	89	98	1988–1994
1989	797	Steven Venner	4	0	1989
1989	798	Warwick Angus	13	3	1989–1991
1989	799	Derek Kickett	12	12	1989
1989	800	Tim McGrath	7	0	1989, 1991
1989	801	Wayne Carey	244	671	1989–2001
1989	802	Leigh Tudor	8	6	1989–1992
1989	803	Liam Pickering	22	8	1989–1992
1989	804	Andrew Krakouer	8	8	1989–1990
1989	805	Anthony Stevens	292	127	1989–2004

=== 1990s ===
Debut Year	Shinboner	Player	Games	Goals	Years
1990	806	Mark Brayshaw	32	2	1990–1992
1990	807	Steven Hamilton	6	1	1990
1990	808	Michael Gallagher	38	6	1990–1992
1990	809	Anthony Dwyer	30	27	1990–1996
1991	810	Peter Mann	39	12	1991–1994
1991	811	Damien Murray	2	0	1991
1991	812	Mark Roberts	125	150	1991–1999
1991	813	Justin Staritski	25	4	1991–1992
1991	814	Carl Dilena	10	8	1991–1992
1992	815	Kristian Bardsley	5	4	1992–1993
1992	816	Richard Dennis	13	6	1992
1992	817	Glenn Archer	311	143	1992–2007
1992	818	Marty Christensen	2	1	1992
1992	819	Alex Ishchenko	70	12	1992–1995
1992	820	Glenn Page	5	0	1992
1992	821	Adam McCarthy	15	3	1992, 1994
1992	822	Mark Attard	3	2	1992
1993	823	John Blakey	224	72	1993–2002
1993	824	Brendan Bower	2	3	1993
1993	825	Greg Eppelstun	1	0	1993
1993	826	Dean Laidley	99	4	1993–1997
1993	827	Jason Daniltchenko	29	18	1993–1997
1993	828	Robert Pyman	16	8	1993–1995
1993	829	Adrian McAdam	36	92	1993–1995
1993	830	Corey McKernan	196	250	1993–2001, 2004
1993	831	Brad Sholl	2	0	1993–1994
1994	832	David King	241	145	1994–2004
1994	833	Trent Nichols	33	39	1994–1996
1994	834	Stuart Anderson	61	20	1994–1997
1994	835	Gareth John	1	0	1994
1994	836	Warren Campbell	19	17	1994–1995
1994	837	John Barnett	6	4	1994–1995
1994	838	Matthew Capuano	82	24	1994–2000
1995	839	Matthew Armstrong	43	18	1995–1996
1995	840	Keenan Reynolds	12	2	1995–1996
1995	841	Robert Scott	113	58	1995–2000
1995	842	Glenn Freeborn	55	27	1995–1998
1995	843	Mark Stevens	21	20	1995–1997
1995	844	Adam Simpson	306	83	1995–2009
1995	845	Paul Geister	3	0	1995
1996	846	Peter Bell	123	120	1996–2000
1996	847	Bradley Plain	1	1	1996
1996	848	Sam McFarlane	2	0	1996
1996	849	Scott Welsh	36	30	1996–1999
1996	850	Eric Lissenden	2	1	1996
1996	851	Glenn Gorman	2	0	1996
1996	852	Danny Stevens	15	7	1996–1999
1996	853	Brent Harvey	432	518	1996–2016
1997	854	Brett Chandler	44	6	1997–2000
1997	855	Martin Pike	81	19	1997–2000
1997	856	Anthony Mellington	20	19	1997–1999
1997	857	Julian Kirzner	3	5	1997
1997	858	Paul Wynd	3	0	1997
1997	859	Evan Hewitt	33	22	1997–2000
1997	860	Byron Pickett	120	81	1997–2002
1997	861	Chris Groom	5	1	1997–1998
1998	862	Winston Abraham	72	104	1998–2001
1998	863	Brady Anderson	27	2	1998–2000
1998	864	Shannon Grant	243	323	1998–2008
1998	865	Jason McCartney	107	15	1998–2003
1998	866	Stuart Cochrane	50	11	1998–2002
1998	867	Dion Miles	2	1	1998
1998	868	Shannon Watt	155	9	1998-2009
1999	869	Shane Clayton	99	51	1999–2004
1999	870	Gary Dhurrkay	21	20	1999–2000
1999	871	Adam Lange	28	22	1999–2002
1999	872	Brady Rawlings	245	62	1999–2011
1999	873	Cameron Mooney	11	2	1999
1999	874	Kent Kingsley	12	10	1999–2000
1999	875	Shannon Motlop	54	31	1999–2003

=== 2000s ===
Debut Year	Shinboner	Player	Games	Goals	Years
2000	876	Matthew Burton	77	33	2000–2003
2000	877	David Calthorpe	13	10	2000
2000	878	Ryan Pagan	3	0	2000
2000	879	Leigh Colbert	104	14	2000–2005
2000	880	Troy Makepeace	139	37	2000–2006
2000	881	John Spaull	8	5	2000–2001
2000	882	Brad Stephens	2	0	2000
2001	883	Daniel Harris	149	44	2001–2009
2001	884	Drew Petrie	316	428	2001–2016
2001	885	Sav Rocca	101	234	2001–2006
2001	886	Jess Sinclair	142	45	2001–2008
2001	887	Dylan Smith	11	1	2001–2002
2001	888	Corey Jones	157	216	2001–2010
2001	889	Rick Olarenshaw	1	0	2001
2001	890	Joe McLaren	12	6	2001
2001	891	Digby Morrell	40	47	2001–2003
2001	892	Lindsay Smith	1	1	2001
2001	893	David Teague	33	4	2001–2003
2001	894	Leigh Harding	141	157	2001–2010
2001	895	Daniel Motlop	47	53	2001–2005
2001	896	Mark Hilton	1	0	2001
2002	897	John Baird	46	7	2002–2005
2002	898	Mark Porter	55	7	2002–2004
2002	899	Ben Robbins	40	7	2002–2003
2003	900	Leigh Brown	118	64	2003–2008
2003	901	Jeremy Clayton	8	6	2003–2004
2003	902	Daniel Wells	243	150	2003–2016
2003	903	David Hale	129	119	2003–2010
2003	904	David Bourke	1	1	2003
2003	905	Ashley Watson	7	1	2003–2005
2003	906	Michael Firrito	275	29	2003–2016
2003	907	Michael Stevens	44	16	2003–2005
2004	908	Eddie Sansbury	40	21	2004–2008
2004	909	Blake Grima	15	3	2004–2008
2004	910	Chad Jones	6	1	2004-2006
2004	911	Shane Harvey	3	4	2004
2004	912	Callum Urch	8	1	2004–2006
2005	913	Lance Picioane	15	2	2005
2005	914	Daniel Pratt	116	9	2005–2011
2005	915	Nathan Thompson	60	135	2005–2008
2005	916	Hamish McIntosh	107	59	2005–2012
2005	917	Jesse Smith	27	3	2005–2008
2005	918	Brent LeCras	6	1	2005–2006
2005	919	Justin Perkins	4	0	2005
2005	920	David Trotter	7	2	2005–2007
2006	921	Josh Gibson	65	2	2006–2009
2006	922	Kasey Green	39	15	2006–2007
2006	923	Jonathan Hay	8	0	2006
2006	924	Cameron Thurley	5	0	2006
2006	925	Joel Perry	8	0	2006
2006	926	Ben Schwarze	11	2	2006
2006	927	Andrew Swallow	224	80	2006–2017
2006	928	Jade Rawlings	3	2	2006
2006	929	Ed Lower	42	16	2006–2010
2006	930	Daniel McConnell	4	0	2006
2006	931	Brad Moran	3	0	2006–2007
2007	932	Matt Campbell	82	79	2007–2012
2007	933	Lachlan Hansen	151	81	2007–2017
2007	934	Matt Riggio	10	0	2007–2009
2007	935	Lindsay Thomas	205	325	2007–2017
2007	936	Aaron Edwards	78	122	2007–2012
2007	937	Leigh Adams	104	72	2007–2014
2007	938	Scott McMahon	124	28	2007–2015
2007	939	Djaran Whyman	3	4	2007
2008	940	Sam Power	39	2	2008–2009
2008	941	Scott Thompson	241	7	2008–2019
2008	942	Ben Ross	14	4	2008–2010
2008	943	Josh Smith	11	2	2008–2010
2008	944	Alan Obst	5	0	2008–2009
2008	945	Gavin Urquhart	41	3	2008–2011
2008	946	Ben Davies	2	0	2008
2008	947	Todd Goldstein	315	157	2008–2023
2009	948	Jack Ziebell	258	183	2009-2023
2009	949	Ben Warren	29	34	2009–2012
2009	950	Levi Greenwood	74	26	2009–2014
2009	951	Nathan Grima	86	1	2009–2015
2009	952	Sam Wright	136	58	2009–2019
2009	953	Cruize Garlett	32	9	2009–2012
2009	954	Liam Anthony	58	27	2009–2014

=== 2010s ===
Debut Year	Shinboner	Player	Games	Goals	Years
2010	955	Ryan Bastinac	121	66	2010–2015
2010	956	Ben Cunnington	238	98	2010-2023
2010	957	Nathan O'Keefe	2	1	2010
2010	958	Robbie Tarrant	174	44	2010–2021
2010	959	Jamie Macmillan	167	46	2010–2020
2010	960	Ben Speight	10	7	2010–2011
2010	961	Marcus White	2	0	2010
2011	962	Shaun Atley	234	45	2011–2021
2011	963	Ben McKinley	2	0	2011
2011	964	Cameron Pedersen	16	20	2011–2012
2011	965	Cameron Richardson	8	1	2011
2011	966	Kieran Harper	40	37	2011–2015
2011	967	Luke Delaney	26	1	2011–2013
2011	968	Aaron Mullett	85	31	2011–2017
2011	969	Aaron Black	50	64	2011–2016
2012	970	Cameron Delaney	6	0	2012–2013
2012	971	Brad McKenzie	37	6	2012–2016
2012	972	Sam Gibson	130	51	2012–2017
2013	973	Taylor Hine	14	0	2013
2013	974	Ben Jacobs	64	10	2013–2018
2013	975	Majak Daw	54	43	2013–2020
2013	976	Will Sierakowski	7	1	2013
2013	977	Taylor Garner	49	37	2013–2021
2014	978	Nick Dal Santo	62	16	2014–2016
2014	979	Luke McDonald^	236	19	2014–
2014	980	Daniel Currie	4	3	2014–2015
2014	981	Robin Nahas	34	35	2014–2016
2014	982	Joel Tippett	7	0	2014–2016
2014	983	Ben Brown	130	287	2014–2020
2014	984	Max Warren	1	0	2014–2015
2014	985	Kayne Turner	130	61	2014–2023
2014	986	Mason Wood	65	76	2014–2020
2015	987	Shaun Higgins	108	96	2015–2020
2015	988	Jarrad Waite	60	125	2015–2018
2015	989	Trent Dumont	113	26	2015–2021
2016	990	Jed Anderson	89	28	2016–2022
2016	991	Farren Ray	4	1	2016
2016	992	Corey Wagner	8	0	2016–2017
2016	993	Ryan Clarke	40	8	2016–2018
2017	994	Mitchell Hibberd	4	0	2017
2017	995	Nathan Hrovat	39	21	2017–2019
2017	996	Declan Mountford	12	3	2017–2017
2017	997	Braydon Preuss	8	5	2017–2017
2017	998	Jy Simpkin^	196	87	2017–
2017	999	Marley Williams	60	5	2017–2020
2017	1000	Sam Durdin	22	1	2017–2020
2017	1001	Ed Vickers-Willis	21	0	2017–2020
2017	1002	Daniel Nielson	7	0	2017–2018
2017	1003	Cameron Zurhaar^	166	210	2017–
2017	1004	Nick Larkey^	157	323	2017–
2017	1005	Josh Williams	2	1	2017–2017
2017	1006	Ben McKay	71	1	2017–2023
2018	1007	Luke Davies-Uniacke^	154	56	2018–
2018	1008	Billy Hartung	13	6	2018
2018	1009	Paul Ahern	24	6	2018–2020
2018	1010	Tom Murphy	9	1	2018–2019
2018	1011	Alex Morgan	2	0	2018
2019	1012	Will Walker	6	4	2018—2020
2019	1013	Aaron Hall	58	18	2019–2023
2019	1014	Jasper Pittard	33	5	2019–2020
2019	1015	Jared Polec	42	20	2019–2022
2019	1016	Bailey Scott	116	35	2019–2026
2019	1017	Dom Tyson	6	1	2019–2021
2019	1018	Tom Campbell	12	7	2019–2022
2019	1019	Tarryn Thomas	69	56	2019–2023
2019	1020	Curtis Taylor	76	33	2019–2024
2019	1021	Kyron Hayden	17	0	2019–2022

=== 2020s ===
Debut Year	Shinboner	Player	Games	Goals	Years
2020	1022	Josh Walker	54	6	2020–2022
2020	1023	Aiden Bonar	28	0	2020–2023
2020	1024	Jack Mahony	44	18	2020–2023
2020	1025	Tristan Xerri^	95	33	2020–
2020	1026	Lachlan Hosie	5	3	2020
2020	1027	Flynn Perez	24	1	2020–2023
2021	1028	Aidan Corr^	90	1	2021–
2021	1029	Charlie Lazzaro	39	5	2021–2024
2021	1030	Connor Menadue	7	0	2021
2021	1031	Tom Powell^	99	34	2021–
2021	1032	Jaidyn Stephenson	68	54	2021–2024
2021	1033	Lachie Young	39	1	2021–2023
2021	1034	Will Phillips	50	8	2021–2025
2021	1035	Atu Bosenavulagi	17	1	2021–
2021	1036	Eddie Ford	40	31	2021–2025
2021	1037	Charlie Comben^	70	9	2021–
2021	1038	Phoenix Spicer	12	2	2021–2023
2022	1039	Callum Coleman-Jones	28	9	2022–2026
2022	1040	Hugh Greenwood	38	7	2022–2024
2022	1041	Jason Horne-Francis	17	4	2022
2022	1042	Paul Curtis^	98	135	2022–
2022	1043	Miller Bergman	16	0	2022–2025
2022	1044	Jackson Archer^	26	0	2022–
2022	1045	Kallan Dawson	19	1	2022–2025
2022	1046	Josh Goater^	18	0	2022–
2023	1047	Griffin Logue^	49	2	2023–
2023	1048	Harry Sheezel^	89	37	2023–
2023	1049	Liam Shiels	33	7	2023–2024
2023	1050	Daniel Howe	11	2	2023
2023	1051	Darcy Tucker	48	9	2023—2025
2023	1052	Blake Drury	10	3	2023–2024
2023	1053	George Wardlaw^	55	18	2023–
2023	1054	Cooper Harvey^	17	11	2023-
2023	1055	Robert Hansen Jr.	20	7	2023-2026
2024	1056	Zane Duursma	38	28	2024—2026
2024	1057	Zac Fisher^	26	2	2024—
2024	1058	Colby McKercher^	62	18	2024—
2024	1059	Toby Pink^	37	7	2024—
2024	1060	Dylan Stephens^	61	10	2024—
2024	1061	Bigoa Nyuon	3	0	2024
2024	1062	Tyler Sellers	2	0	2024
2024	1063	Riley Hardeman^	27	1	2024—
2024	1064	Wil Dawson^	18	0	2024—
2024	1065	Brynn Teakle	15	10	2024—2025
2025	1066	Caleb Daniel^	46	0	2025—
2025	1067	Jack Darling^	44	60	2025—
2025	1068	Jacob Konstanty^	33	18	2025—
2025	1069	Finn O'Sullivan^	41	6	2025—
2025	1070	Luke Parker^	45	15	2025—
2025	1071	Matt Whitlock^	5	3	2025—
2025	1072	Finnbar Maley	7	4	2025
2025	1073	Zac Banch^	12	8	2025—
2025	1074	Geordie Payne^	3	3	2025—
2025	1075	Cooper Trembath^	26	41	2025—
2026	1076	Tom Blamires^	17	3	2026—
2026	1077	Lachy Dovaston^	6	3	2026—
2026	1078	Charlie Spargo^	19	12	2026—
2026	1079	Taylor Goad^	2	0	2026—

== Women ==
Updated to round 8, 2026

Debut Year	Shinboner	Player	Games	Goals	Years
2019	1	Sophie Abbatangelo	42	29	2019–2022 (S7)
2019	2	Kaitlyn Ashmore	33	17	2019–2022 (S6)
2019	3	Daisy Bateman	34	22	2019–2022 (S6)
2019	4	Nicole Bresnehan^	64	0	2019–
2019	5	Jenna Bruton^	88	14	2019–
2019	6	Alison Drennan	7	1	2019
2019	7	Jess Duffin	19	1	2019–2022 (S6)
2019	8	Jasmine Garner^	97	95	2019–
2019	9	Brittany Gibson	14	3	2019–2022 (S6)
2019	10	Kate Gillespie-Jones	24	5	2019–2021
2019	11	Jasmine Grierson	19	0	2019–2021
2019	12	Danielle Hardiman	30	0	2019–2022 (S7)
2019	13	Moana Hope	7	8	2019
2019	14	Emma Humphries	6	0	2019–2020
2019	15	Emma Kearney^	85	10	2019–
2019	16	Emma King^	89	55	2019–
2019	17	Georgia Nascawen	2	0	2019
2019	18	Tahlia Randall^	98	98	2019–
2019	19	Ashleigh Riddell^	93	21	2019–
2019	20	Jamie Stanton	7	0	2019
2019	21	Jess Trend	14	1	2019–2020
2019	22	Elisha King	10	3	2019–2022 (S6)
2019	23	Chloe Haines	1	0	2019
2019	24	Courteney Munn	2	4	2019
2019	25	Beth Lynch	8	2	2019–2021
2019	26	Daria Bannister	24	14	2019–2022 (S6)
2019	27	Taylor Mesiti	2	0	2019–2020
2020	28	Ellie Gavalas	41	13	2020–2023
2020	29	Aileen Gilroy	28	0	2020–2022 (S6)
2020	30	Vivien Saad	16	0	2020–2021
2020	31	Sarah Wright	61	1	2020–2025
2020	32	Abbey Green	2	2	2020
2020	33	Tahni Nestor	9	0	2020–2021
2020	34	Mia King^	74	9	2020–
2021	35	Isabella Eddey^	81	37	2021–
2021	36	Alice O'Loughlin^	67	53	2021–
2021	37	Grace Campbell	13	2	2021–2022 (S7)
2021	38	Brooke Brown	24	1	2021–2022 (S7)
2021	39	Georgia Hammond	1	0	2021–2021
2022 (S6)	40	Tess Craven^	67	17	2022 (S6)–
2022 (S6)	41	Jasmine Ferguson^	73	0	2022 (S6)–
2022 (S6)	42	Kimberley Rennie^	72	2	2022 (S6)–
2022 (S6)	43	Amy Smith^	60	6	2022 (S6)–
2022 (S6)	44	Alexia Hamilton	2	0	2022 (S6)
2022 (S7)	45	Taylah Gatt^	50	6	2022 (S7)–
2022 (S7)	46	Charli Granville	4	2	2022 (S7)–2023
2022 (S7)	47	Sophia McCarthy	4	1	2022 (S7)–2023
2022 (S7)	48	Erika O'Shea^	57	2	2022 (S7)–
2022 (S7)	49	Vikki Wall^	47	28	2022 (S7)–
2022 (S7)	50	Ella Maurer	1	0	2022 (S7)
2022 (S7)	51	Zoe Savarirayan	4	0	2022 (S7)–2024
2022 (S7)	52	Hannah Bowey	4	0	2022 (S7)–2023
2023	53	Lulu Pullar	13	3	2023–2024
2023	54	Eliza Shannon^	39	0	2023–
2023	55	Kate Shierlaw^	45	48	2023–
2023	56	Ruby Tripodi^	46	8	2023–
2023	57	Ailish Considine	1	0	2023
2023	58	Niamh Martin	16	8	2023–2025
2024	59	Libby Birch^	36	0	2024–
2024	60	Lucy Burke	1	0	2024
2025	61	Blaithin Bogue^	23	34	2025–
2025	62	Ariana Hetherinton	5	0	2025
2025	63	Eilish Sheerin^	16	8	2025–
2025	64	Amy Gavin Mangan^	15	4	2025–
2025	65	Ella Slocombe	1	0	2025
2026	66	Claire Mahony^	7	0	2026–
2026	67	Abby Favell^	2	0	2026–
2026	68	Kristie-Lee Weston-Turner^	2	0	2026–

== See also ==
- List of North Melbourne Football Club coaches
