= Reginald Taylor =

Reginald Taylor may refer to:

- Reginald Taylor (cricketer) (1909–1984), English cricketer
- Sir Reginald Taylor (engineer) (1895–1971), British civil engineer and civil servant

== See also ==
- Reggie Taylor (born 1977), American baseball outfielder
- Reggie Taylor (Canadian football) (born 1964), Canadian football player
- Reg Taylor (1908–1982), Australian rules footballer
