= Syd Jackson =

Syd Jackson may refer to:

- Syd Jackson (speedway rider) (c. 1908–?), British speedway rider
- Syd Jackson (footballer, born 1944), Aboriginal Australian rules footballer for East Perth and Carlton
- Syd Jackson (footballer, born 1917) (1917–2000), Australian rules footballer for North Melbourne
- Syd Jackson (Māori activist) (1939–2007), Māori activist, unionist, and leader
- Syd Jackson (politician) (1889–1941), Australian politician
