= Meeking =

Meeking is a surname. Notable people with the surname include:

- Antonio Meeking (born 1981), American basketball player
- Basil Meeking (1929–2020), New Zealand Roman Catholic bishop
- Gordon Meeking (1890–1965), Canadian ice hockey player
- Harry Meeking (1894–1971), Canadian ice hockey player
- Lindsay Meeking (1903–1960), Australian rules footballer
