= Seery =

Seery is a surname of Irish origin. Notable people with the surname include:

- Colin Seery (born 1957), Australian rules footballer
- Emmett Seery (1861–1930), American baseball player
- Eva Seery (1874–1937), Australian political organiser
- John Seery (born 1941), American artist
- Neil Seery (born 1979), Irish mixed martial artist
- Thomas Seery (born 1945), American lawyer and politician
