= Spratling =

Spratling is a surname. Notable people with the surname include:

- Col Spratling (1918–2006), Australian rules footballer
- Huw Spratling (born 1949), British composer
- William Spratling (1900–1967), American silversmith and artist
- William P. Spratling (1863–1915), American neurologist
