= Ronald Walsh =

Ronald or Ron Walsh may refer to:

- Bunna Walsh (Ronald William Walsh, 1933–2022), Australian politician
- Ron Walsh (1932–2003), Australian VFL player

== Fictional characters ==
- Ron Walsh, in the US soap opera One Life to Live, played by Timothy Adams
