= William Reddick =

William Reddick may refer to:

- William Reddick (politician) (1812–1885), Irish-American businessman, politician and philanthropist
- William H. Reddick (1840–1903), American Civil War Medal of Honor recipient
- Bill Reddick (footballer) (William Thomas Reddick, 1935–2008), Australian rules footballer
- Bill Reddick (artist), Canadian artist
- Josh Reddick (William Joshua Reddick, born 1987), American baseball outfielder
