= Ron Moran =

Australian rules footballer

Personal information
- Full name: Ronald James Moran
- Born: 18 February 1926; West Melbourne, Victoria
- Died: 26 February 1997 (aged 71)
- Height: 184 cm (6 ft 0 in)
- Weight: 89 kg (196 lb)

Playing career^{1}
Years	Club	Games (Goals)
1946	North Melbourne	1 (0)
- ^{1} Playing statistics correct to the end of 1946.

Ronald James Moran (18 February 1926 – 26 February 1997) was an Australian rules footballer who played a single game with North Melbourne in the Victorian Football League (VFL).

He was he younger brother of Jack Moran who also played for North Melbourne.

Prior to playing with North Melbourne, Moran served in the Royal Australian Air Force during World War II.
