= Doug Woolley =

Australian rules footballer

Personal information
- Full name: Doug Woolley
- Born: 26 March 1940 (age 86)
- Original team: Bayswater
- Height: 180 cm (5 ft 11 in)
- Weight: 79 kg (174 lb)

Playing career^{1}
Years	Club	Games (Goals)
1962	North Melbourne	6 (0)
- ^{1} Playing statistics correct to the end of 1962.

Doug Woolley (born 26 March 1940) is a former Australian rules footballer who played with North Melbourne in the Victorian Football League (VFL).
