= Stan Mitchell (Australian footballer) =

Australian rules footballer

Personal information
- Full name: Stan Mitchell
- Born: 20 February 1952 (age 74)
- Original team: Oak Park
- Height: 180 cm (5 ft 11 in)
- Weight: 75 kg (165 lb)

Playing career^{1}
Years	Club	Games (Goals)
1971–72	North Melbourne	18 (10)
- ^{1} Playing statistics correct to the end of 1972.

Stan Mitchell (born 20 February 1952) is a former Australian rules footballer who played with North Melbourne in the Victorian Football League (VFL).
