= Tom Sleightholm =

Australian rules footballer (1916–2004)

Personal information
- Full name: Thomas Leonard Anzac Sleightholm
- Born: 14 June 1916; Richmond, Victoria
- Died: 18 May 2004 (aged 87); Yarrawonga, Victoria
- Original team: Maribyrnong

Playing career^{1}
Years	Club	Games (Goals)
1934	North Melbourne	1 (0)
- ^{1} Playing statistics correct to the end of 1934.

Thomas Leonard Anzac Sleightholm (14 June 1916 – 18 May 2004) was an Australian rules footballer who played with North Melbourne in the Victorian Football League (VFL).
