= Morrie Davidson =

Australian rules footballer, born 1910

Personal information
- Full name: Maurice Davidson
- Born: 1904; Melbourne, Victoria
- Died: 11 July 1970 (aged 65–66); Kew, Victoria

Playing career^{1}
Years	Club	Games (Goals)
1930	North Melbourne	4 (0)
- ^{1} Playing statistics correct to the end of 1930.

Maurice Davidson (Note: Davidson was previously thought to be known as Harold Davidson in official league records until January 2024.) (1904 – 11 July 1970) was an Australian rules footballer who played with North Melbourne in the Victorian Football League (VFL).
