= Brian Devitt =

Australian rules footballer

Personal information
- Full name: Brian Devitt
- Born: 5 April 1948 (age 78)
- Original team: WA University
- Height: 193 cm (6 ft 4 in)
- Weight: 96 kg (212 lb)

Playing career^{1}
Years	Club	Games (Goals)
1970	North Melbourne	7 (1)
- ^{1} Playing statistics correct to the end of 1970.

Brian Devitt (born 5 April 1948) is a former Australian rules footballer who played with North Melbourne in the Victorian Football League (VFL).
