= Frank Melville =

Australian rules footballer, born 1903

Personal information
- Full name: Frank Bruce Melville
- Born: 8 February 1903; North Melbourne, Victoria
- Died: 18 January 1971 (aged 67); Queensland
- Height: 185 cm (6 ft 1 in)
- Weight: 84 kg (185 lb)

Playing career^{1}
Years	Club	Games (Goals)
1925, 1929	North Melbourne	13 (3)
1930	Williamstown (VFA)	3 (0)
- ^{1} Playing statistics correct to the end of 1930.

Frank Bruce Melville (8 February 1903 – 18 January 1971) was an Australian rules footballer who played with North Melbourne in the Victorian Football League (VFL).
