= Noel McKernan =

Australian rules footballer

Personal information
- Full name: Noel McKernan
- Born: 4 December 1945 (age 80); Melbourne, Vic
- Height: 175 cm (5 ft 9 in)
- Weight: 70 kg (154 lb)
- Positions: Rover, wing, back pocket

Playing career^{1}
Years	Club	Games (Goals)
1966–68	North Melbourne	11 (1)
- ^{1} Playing statistics correct to the end of 1968.

Noel McKernan (born 4 December 1945) is a former Australian rules footballer who played with North Melbourne in the Victorian Football League (VFL).

First played with Doutta Stars Under 17's in 1961, in the Essendon District Football League. In 1962, he captained a Premiership team.

Played with Essendon Under 19 in 1963 and 1964 and played in a Under 19's Grand Final at Bacchus Marsh against Carlton; because of a draw in the VFL Preliminary Final.

Played in Essendon seconds in 1965, and transferred midway through 1966 to North Melbourne. At North Melbourne, he played in the 1966 VFL Night Premiership bringing the total VFL games played to 14. McKernan played in the North Melbourne seconds premiership in 1967 and was transferred to Preston in the VFA midway through the 1968 season.

McKernan played in Preston's 1968 and 1969 premiership under the coaching of Alan Joyce.
