= Ron Fletcher (footballer) =

Australian rules footballer

Personal information
- Full name: Ron Fletcher
- Born: 29 April 1927
- Died: 19 September 2011 (aged 84)
- Original team: Wonthaggi / Preston
- Height: 185 cm (6 ft 1 in)
- Weight: 85 kg (187 lb)
- Position: Ruck

Playing career^{1}
| Years | Club | Games (Goals) |
| 1951–52 | North Melbourne | 21 (0) |
- ^{1} Playing statistics correct to the end of 1952.

Ron Fletcher (29 April 1927 – 19 September 2011) was an Australian rules footballer who played with North Melbourne in the Victorian Football League (VFL).
