= Dave Farrell (footballer) =

Australian rules footballer, born 1905

Personal information
- Full name: David Farrell
- Born: 24 December 1905
- Died: 21 June 1974 (aged 68)
- Height: 179 cm (5 ft 10 in)

Playing career^{1}
Years	Club	Games (Goals)
1929	North Melbourne	3 (0)
- ^{1} Playing statistics correct to the end of 1929.

David Farrell (24 December 1905 – 21 June 1974) was an Australian rules footballer who played with North Melbourne in the Victorian Football League (VFL).
