= Ray Mead (footballer) =

Australian rules footballer (1913–2001)

Personal information
- Full name: Ray Mead
- Born: 12 April 1913
- Died: 17 May 2001 (aged 88)

Playing career^{1}
Years	Club	Games (Goals)
1934	North Melbourne	12 (0)
- ^{1} Playing statistics correct to the end of 1934.

Ray Mead (12 April 1913 – 17 May 2001) was an Australian rules footballer who played with North Melbourne in the Victorian Football League (VFL).
