= Lawrie Blades =

Australian rules footballer

Personal information
- Full name: Laurence Blades
- Born: 19 August 1916; Carlton, Victoria
- Died: 10 February 2006 (aged 89)
- Height: 168 cm (5 ft 6 in)
- Weight: 70 kg (154 lb)

Playing career^{1}
Years	Club	Games (Goals)
1942	North Melbourne	2 (0)
- ^{1} Playing statistics correct to the end of 1942.

Laurence Blades (19 August 1916 – 10 February 2006) was an Australian rules footballer who played with North Melbourne in the Victorian Football League (VFL).
