= George Dykes =

Australian rules footballer, born 1903

Personal information
- Full name: George Dykes
- Born: 23 September 1903
- Died: 25 December 1978 (aged 75)
- Original team: Seymour

Playing career^{1}
Years	Club	Games (Goals)
1929–30	North Melbourne	8 (1)
- ^{1} Playing statistics correct to the end of 1930.

George Dykes (23 September 1903 – 25 December 1978) was an Australian rules footballer who played with North Melbourne in the Victorian Football League (VFL).
