= Garry Cameron =

Australian rules footballer

Personal information
- Full name: Garry Cameron
- Born: 5 April 1948 (age 78)
- Original team: St Albans
- Height: 192 cm (6 ft 4 in)
- Weight: 89 kg (196 lb)

Playing career^{1}
Years	Club	Games (Goals)
1967	North Melbourne	1 (0)
- ^{1} Playing statistics correct to the end of 1967.

Garry Cameron (born 5 April 1948) is a former Australian rules footballer who played with North Melbourne in the Victorian Football League (VFL).
