= Phil Dunstone =

Australian rules footballer, born 1914

Personal information
- Full name: Phillip Samuel Dunstone
- Born: 4 October 1914; Collingwood, Victoria
- Died: 19 September 2000 (aged 85)
- Height: 170 cm (5 ft 7 in)
- Weight: 71 kg (157 lb)

Playing career^{1}
Years	Club	Games (Goals)
1943–44	North Melbourne	13 (15)
- ^{1} Playing statistics correct to the end of 1944.

Phillip Samuel Dunstone (4 October 1914 – 19 September 2000) was an Australian rules footballer who played with North Melbourne in the Victorian Football League (VFL).

His football career ended after he enlisted to serve in the Royal Australian Air Force in World War II and he was posted to serve in Papua New Guinea.
