= Bob Oswald =

Australian rules footballer, born 1909

Personal information
- Full name: Robert Dent Oswald
- Born: 4 April 1909; Williamstown, Victoria
- Died: 5 December 1981 (aged 72); Altona, Victoria

Playing career^{1}
Years	Club	Games (Goals)
1929	North Melbourne	5 (1)
- ^{1} Playing statistics correct to the end of 1929.

Robert Dent Oswald (4 April 1909 – 5 December 1981) was an Australian rules footballer who played with North Melbourne in the Victorian Football League (VFL).

== Family ==
The son of William Dent Oswald (1890-), and Margaret Ann Oswald (1885-1969), née Carl, Robert Dent Oswald was born at Williamstown, Victoria on 4 April 1909.

He married Elwyn Carnegie Edwards (1912-2006) in 1931. He married Hazel Doreen Webb (1920-1967) in 1944.

== Football ==
He played 5 games for the North Melbourne First XVIII in 1929.

== Military service ==
Oswald served in the Australian Army for two separate periods during World War II.

== Death ==
He died at Altona, Victoria on 5 December 1981.
