= Roland Crosby =

Australian rules footballer

Personal information
- Full name: Roland Crosby
- Born: 15 February 1944
- Died: 8 April 2008 (aged 64)
- Original team: Shepparton
- Height: 183 cm (6 ft 0 in)
- Weight: 92 kg (203 lb)

Playing career^{1}
Years	Club	Games (Goals)
1963–64	North Melbourne	10 (3)
- ^{1} Playing statistics correct to the end of 1964.

Roland Crosby (full name Rowland Lance Crosby) (15 February 1944 – 8 April 2008) was an Australian rules footballer.

This summary of his football career is from the website gvleague.com.au:

"During the 1950s a budding sports star from Shepparton named Rowland Crosby contracted rheumatic fever and because of the concern about his illness, hopes faded for his sporting future. But his love of sport was intense. The young Crosby fought valiantly as a youth and his strength showed out to beat the illness and excel at all sports. He would eventually play 308 games of senior football, have a distinguished coaching record and become a great football personality. By the time he left school to work in his father’s butcher shop he was recognised as a star footballer in the making and under Tom Hafey’s tutelage became a top Shepparton player. He developed into a big strong player who was known as “Rugged Rowland”. He was also a quality express bowler on the cricket field. After playing 45 games of football with Shepparton, he came under the notice of the VFL talent scouts and in 1963 was recruited by the North Melbourne Kangaroos where he played 10 games before choosing to return to his home town. He coached Shepparton East in the Murray League in 1966 and then returned to the GVL as he was appointed as coach of the Lemnos Swans.His Swans coaching career over four seasons and 95 games was highlighted by a famous premiership in 1970, the first for the swans in the GVL. Rowland had star qualities as a player and a coach whose mantra was “I’ll show you the way and you get behind me”. He had the ability to attract top players who would give their all for the popular “Cros”. His next coaching job was with Tatura where he coached for three seasons and played 66 games. He then had a stint coaching Devonport in Tasmania, and on his return to Shepparton he was non playing coach for three seasons at Shepparton and two seasons at Shepparton United. When the Winfield Country Championships commenced in 1978 Rowland became a selector for the GVL and when the team won the championship in the very first year, “Cros” was hooked on representative football. That commenced a long involvement with the GVL in interleague football. He coached the League team for a total of fifteen games from1981 through to 1986. His most successful year was 1984 when Rowland coached the GVL to defeat the Geelong League to win the Country Championship grand final. Rowland love being involved in football and took a position with the Melbourne Football Club as country development officer. He was also honoured to be chosen to coach the Victorian Country Football League representative team. He, with other 200 game players was instrumental in forming the GVFL 200 club. Rowland Crosby was a household name in the Goulburn Valley. He gained a reputation as a tough competitor who had great ability and reached the top of his sport as a country footballer through his talent and ability to organise, mentor and get the best out of footballers. He was a successful sportsman who gave his all to the teams he coached and the League he loved. The Goulburn Valley League now officially recognises that wonderful contribution by inducting Rowland Crosby into the GVL Hall of Fame."

Rowland played with North Melbourne in the Victorian Football League (VFL) in 1963 and 1964.

Wife: Barbara June Crosby (nee Keenan) (1945-2007). Children: Shaun, Kerri, Leigh and Scott.
