= Laurie Shipp =

Australian rules footballer (1929–2020)

Personal information
- Full name: Leslie Lawrence Shipp
- Born: 27 September 1929
- Died: 18 April 2020 (aged 90)
- Original team: Moe
- Height: 185 cm (6 ft 1 in)
- Weight: 83 kg (183 lb)

Playing career^{1}
Years	Club	Games (Goals)
1949–51	North Melbourne	33 (3)
- ^{1} Playing statistics correct to the end of 1951.

Leslie Lawrence 'Laurie' Shipp (27 September 1929 – 18 April 2020) was an Australian rules footballer who played with North Melbourne in the Victorian Football League (VFL).
