= George Kokkin =

Australian rules footballer

Personal information
- Full name: George Kokkin
- Born: 17 November 1925
- Died: 17 July 2008 (aged 82)
- Height: 175 cm (5 ft 9 in)
- Weight: 76 kg (168 lb)

Playing career^{1}
Years	Club	Games (Goals)
1947, 1949–50	North Melbourne	19 (1)
- ^{1} Playing statistics correct to the end of 1950.

George Kokkin (17 November 1925 – 17 July 2008) was an Australian rules footballer who played with North Melbourne in the Victorian Football League (VFL).
