= Ken Bracken =

Australian rules footballer, born 1903

Personal information
- Full name: Ken Bracken
- Born: 24 August 1903
- Died: 25 February 1978 (aged 74)
- Original team: St George
- Height: 180 cm (5 ft 11 in)
- Weight: 70 kg (154 lb)

Playing career^{1}
| Years | Club | Games (Goals) |
| 1932 | North Melbourne | 1 (0) |
- ^{1} Playing statistics correct to the end of 1932.

Ken Bracken (24 August 1903 – 25 February 1978) was an Australian rules footballer who played with North Melbourne in the Victorian Football League (VFL).
