= Brian Mulvihill =

Australian rules footballer

Personal information
- Full name: Brian David Mulvihill
- Born: 17 November 1946; Surrey, England
- Died: 8 July 2013 (aged 66); South Australia
- Height: 193 cm (6 ft 4 in)
- Weight: 97 kg (214 lb)
- Position: Forward

Playing career^{1}
Years	Club	Games (Goals)
1965–1970	West Torrens	89 (200)
1971–1972	North Melbourne	24 (25)
1973–1975	West Torrens	47 (186)
1976–1977	Woodville	24 (62)
- ^{1} Playing statistics correct to the end of 1977.

Brian David Mulvihill (17 November 1946 – 8 July 2013) was an Australian rules footballer who played with North Melbourne in the Victorian Football League (VFL). He also played for West Torrens and Woodville in the South Australian National Football League (SANFL).

Mulvihill was a key forward and took home the West Torrens goal-kicking honours every year from 1966 to 1969. His efforts in 1969 were enough to earn him selection in The Advertiser's 'Team of the Year' as a centre half forward.

He spent two seasons at North Melbourne, putting together 15 games in his first year for a return of 16 goals. Used at times as a half back flanker, he kicked nine goals from his name games in 1972.

In 1973, Mulvihill returned to West Torrens and topped their goal-kicking that season as well as in 1974 for the sixth time to equal the club record. His career best tally in a game was 12 goals against Woodville, the club at which he finished his career.

Brian Mulvihill died in July 2013.
