= Dave Meehan =

Australian rules footballer (1940–2019)

Personal information
- Full name: David James Meehan
- Born: 18 April 1940; Swan Hill
- Died: 28 November 2019 (aged 79); Portland Victoria
- Original team: Lalbert
- Height: 196 cm (6 ft 5 in)
- Weight: 100 kg (220 lb)

Playing career^{1}
Years	Club	Games (Goals)
1961	North Melbourne	1 (0)
- ^{1} Playing statistics correct to the end of 1961.

Dave Meehan (18 April 1940 – 28 November 2019) was an Australian rules footballer who played with North Melbourne in the Victorian Football League (VFL).
