= Glenn Joseph =

Australian rules footballer

Personal information
- Full name: Glenn Joseph
- Born: 6 December 1952 (age 73)
- Original team: Jacana
- Height: 191 cm (6 ft 3 in)
- Weight: 93 kg (205 lb)

Playing career^{1}
Years	Club	Games (Goals)
1970–73	North Melbourne	40 (12)
- ^{1} Playing statistics correct to the end of 1973.

Glenn Joseph (born 6 December 1952) is a former Australian rules footballer who played with North Melbourne in the Victorian Football League (VFL).
