= Roy Pope =

Australian rules footballer, born 1914

Personal information
- Full name: Roy Pope
- Born: 15 June 1914
- Died: 14 February 2004 (aged 89)

Playing career^{1}
Years	Club	Games (Goals)
1933	North Melbourne	9 (4)
- ^{1} Playing statistics correct to the end of 1933.

Roy Pope (15 June 1914 – 14 February 2004) was an Australian rules footballer who played with North Melbourne in the Victorian Football League (VFL).
