= Norm Tomkinson =

Australian rules footballer, born 1917

Personal information
- Full name: Norm Tomkinson
- Born: 11 December 1917
- Died: 18 July 2002 (aged 84)
- Original team: South Kensington
- Height: 178 cm (5 ft 10 in)
- Weight: 76 kg (168 lb)

Playing career^{1}
Years	Club	Games (Goals)
1940	North Melbourne	2 (2)
- ^{1} Playing statistics correct to the end of 1940.

Norm Tomkinson (11 December 1917 – 18 July 2002) was an Australian rules footballer who played with North Melbourne in the Victorian Football League (VFL).
