= Ross Beale =

Australian rules footballer

Personal information
- Full name: Ross Beale
- Born: 21 May 1952 (age 74)
- Height: 188 cm (6 ft 2 in)
- Weight: 86 kg (190 lb)

Playing career^{1}
Years	Club	Games (Goals)
1970–71	North Melbourne	9 (0)
- ^{1} Playing statistics correct to the end of 1971.

Ross Beale (born 21 May 1952) is a former Australian rules footballer who played with North Melbourne in the Victorian Football League (VFL).
