= Bill Sharp (footballer) =

Australian rules footballer, born 1915

Personal information
- Full name: William Henry Sharp
- Born: 27 August 1915; South Yarra, Victoria
- Died: 6 May 2006 (aged 90)
- Height: 175 cm (5 ft 9 in)
- Weight: 65 kg (143 lb)

Playing career^{1}
Years	Club	Games (Goals)
1938–40, 1945	St Kilda	27 (6)
1940	Sandringham (VFA)	8 (4)
1941–42	North Melbourne	3 (0)
- ^{1} Playing statistics correct to the end of 1945.

William Henry Sharp (27 August 1915 – 6 May 2006) was an Australian rules footballer who played with St Kilda and North Melbourne in the Victorian Football League (VFL).

After making his VFL debut in 1938, Sharp transferred to Victorian Football Association (VFA) club Brighton in 1939 before returning to St Kilda in 1940 and then moving to North Melbourne in 1941.

Sharp's football career was interrupted by his service in the Royal Australian Air Force during the Second World War.
