= Michael Gargan =

Australian rules footballer

Personal information
- Full name: Michael Gargan
- Born: 2 December 1947 (age 78)
- Original team: Sale
- Height: 183 cm (6 ft 0 in)
- Weight: 76 kg (168 lb)

Playing career^{1}
| Years | Club | Games (Goals) |
| 1968 | North Melbourne | 3 (2) |
- ^{1} Playing statistics correct to the end of 1968.

Michael Gargan (born 2 December 1947) is a former Australian rules footballer who played with North Melbourne in the Victorian Football League (VFL).
