= Teddy Briggs =

Australian rules footballer (1909–1963)

Personal information
- Full name: Teddy Briggs
- Born: 16 July 1909
- Died: 29 August 1963 (aged 54)
- Height: 183 cm (6 ft 0 in)
- Weight: 91 kg (201 lb)

Playing career^{1}
Years	Club	Games (Goals)
1928–30	North Melbourne	14 (13)
- ^{1} Playing statistics correct to the end of 1930.

Teddy Briggs (16 July 1909 – 29 August 1963) was an Australian rules footballer who played with North Melbourne in the Victorian Football League (VFL).
