= Jack Eudey =

Australian rules footballer, born 1906

Personal information
- Full name: Jack Joseph Eudey
- Born: 3 January 1906; Ballarat East, Victoria
- Died: 15 August 1977 (aged 71); Ferntree Gully, Victoria
- Original team: Laurels
- Height: 175 cm (5 ft 9 in)
- Weight: 85 kg (187 lb)

Playing career^{1}
Years	Club	Games (Goals)
1926	North Melbourne	3 (0)
- ^{1} Playing statistics correct to the end of 1926.

Jack Joseph Eudey (3 January 1906 – 15 August 1977) was an Australian rules footballer who played with North Melbourne in the Victorian Football League (VFL).
