= Brian Neal =

Australian rules footballer

Personal information
- Full name: Brian Neal
- Born: 14 May 1948 (age 78)
- Original team: Glenroy
- Height: 185 cm (6 ft 1 in)
- Weight: 81 kg (179 lb)

Playing career^{1}
Years	Club	Games (Goals)
1969–70	North Melbourne	5 (10)
- ^{1} Playing statistics correct to the end of 1970.

Brian Neal (born 14 May 1948) is a former Australian rules footballer who played with North Melbourne in the Victorian Football League (VFL).
