= Allan McCasker =

Australian rules footballer, born 1902

Personal information
- Full name: Allan Crombie McCasker
- Born: 6 October 1902; Warracknabeal, Victoria
- Died: 29 July 1983 (aged 80); Preston, Victoria

Playing career^{1}
Years	Club	Games (Goals)
1923–25	Northcote (VFA)	18 (7)
1925	North Melbourne	3 (0)
- ^{1} Playing statistics correct to the end of 1925.

Allan Crombie McCasker (6 October 1902 – 29 July 1983) was an Australian rules footballer who played for the North Melbourne Football Club in the Victorian Football League (VFL).

He later served in the Royal Australian Air Force during World War II.
