= Stan Attenborough =

Australian rules footballer, born 1915

Personal information
- Full name: Thomas Stanley Attenborough
- Born: 19 October 1915; Bunbury, Western Australia
- Died: 18 April 1972 (aged 56); Kerang, Victoria
- Original team: Yallourn
- Height: 165 cm (5 ft 5 in)
- Weight: 64 kg (141 lb)

Playing career^{1}
Years	Club	Games (Goals)
1943–44	North Melbourne	8 (0)
- ^{1} Playing statistics correct to the end of 1944.

Thomas Stanley Attenborough (19 October 1915 – 18 April 1972) was an Australian rules footballer who played with North Melbourne in the Victorian Football League (VFL).

Attenborough won the 1945 Morwell Wartime Football Club best and fairest award, when playing in the Central Gippsland Wartime Football League.
