= Paul Johnson (Australian footballer, born 1962) =

Australian rules footballer (born 1962)

Personal information
- Full name: Paul Johnson
- Born: 29 April 1962 (age 64)
- Height: 182 cm (6 ft 0 in)
- Weight: 82 kg (181 lb)

Playing career^{1}
Years	Club	Games (Goals)
1984	North Melbourne	5 (2)
- ^{1} Playing statistics correct to the end of 1984.

Paul Johnson (born 29 April 1962) is a former Australian rules footballer who played with North Melbourne in the Victorian Football League (VFL).
