= Frank Penney =

Australian rules footballer, born 1914

Personal information
- Full name: Frank Henry Penney
- Born: 7 January 1914; Ballarat, Victoria
- Died: 19 January 2009 (aged 95)
- Height: 185 cm (6 ft 1 in)
- Weight: 88 kg (194 lb)

Playing career^{1}
Years	Club	Games (Goals)
1937	North Melbourne	9 (7)
- ^{1} Playing statistics correct to the end of 1937.

Frank Henry Penney (7 January 1914 – 19 January 2009) was an Australian rules footballer who played with North Melbourne in the Victorian Football League (VFL).

Penney served in the Australian Army during World War II after enlisting in Geraldton, Western Australia.
