= Peter Davison (footballer) =

Australian rules footballer (born 1944)

Personal information
- Full name: Peter Davison
- Born: 15 November 1944 (age 81)
- Original team: Oak Park
- Height: 180 cm (5 ft 11 in)
- Weight: 76 kg (168 lb)

Playing career^{1}
Years	Club	Games (Goals)
1964	North Melbourne	4 (0)
- ^{1} Playing statistics correct to the end of 1964.

Peter Davison (born 15 November 1944) is a former Australian rules footballer who played with North Melbourne in the Victorian Football League (VFL). His jumper number was 39.
