= Tom Hayes (Australian footballer) =

Australian rules footballer

Personal information
- Full name: Thomas Daniel Hayes
- Born: 25 October 1921; Yarrawonga, Victoria
- Died: 8 May 2010 (aged 88); Western Australia
- Original team: West Brunswick
- Height: 175 cm (5 ft 9 in)
- Weight: 73 kg (161 lb)

Playing career^{1}
Years	Club	Games (Goals)
1946	North Melbourne	2 (0)
- ^{1} Playing statistics correct to the end of 1946.

Thomas Daniel Hayes (25 October 1921 – 8 May 2010) was an Australian rules footballer who played with North Melbourne in the Victorian Football League (VFL).
