= Reg Sanders =

Australian rules footballer

Personal information
- Full name: Reg Sanders
- Born: 1 January 1947 (age 79); Melbourne, Victoria, Australia
- Died: 12 May 2024
- Original team: Numurkah Football Club
- Height: 185 cm (6 ft 1 in)
- Weight: 83 kg (183 lb)

Playing career^{1}
Years	Club	Games (Goals)
1967, 1969–70	North Melbourne	7 (8)
- ^{1} Playing statistics correct to the end of 1970.

Reg Sanders (born 1 January 1947) is a former Australian rules footballer who played with North Melbourne in the Victorian Football League (VFL).
