= Lloyd Johnson (footballer) =

Australian rules footballer (1913–2004)

Personal information
- Full name: Lloyd Harry Johnson
- Born: 13 December 1913; Flemington, Victoria
- Died: 26 February 2004 (aged 90)
- Original team: Myers / Pascoe Vale
- Height: 173 cm (5 ft 8 in)
- Weight: 68 kg (150 lb)

Playing career^{1}
Years	Club	Games (Goals)
1934–38	North Melbourne	40 (32)
- ^{1} Playing statistics correct to the end of 1938.

Lloyd Harry Johnson (13 December 1913 – 26 February 2004) was an Australian rules footballer who played with North Melbourne in the Victorian Football League (VFL).
