= Lachlan Richards =

Australian rules footballer

Personal information
- Full name: Lachlan Adrian Russell Richards
- Born: 21 December 1900
- Died: 9 April 1930 (aged 29); Ocean Island, Gilbert and Ellice Islands
- Original team: Cowangie

Playing career^{1}
Years	Club	Games (Goals)
1928	North Melbourne	2 (1)
- ^{1} Playing statistics correct to the end of 1928.

Lachlan Adrian Russell Richards (21 December 1900 – 9 April 1930) was an Australian rules footballer who played with North Melbourne in the Victorian Football League (VFL).

In 1930 Richards was working for the British Phosphate Commission on Ocean Island when he died after being hit by a runaway truck whilst waiting to return to Australia.
