= Arthur Staveley =

Australian rules footballer, born 1908

Personal information
- Full name: Arthur Staveley
- Born: 24 July 1908
- Died: 3 February 1977 (aged 68)
- Height: 169 cm (5 ft 7 in)
- Weight: 69 kg (152 lb)

Playing career^{1}
Years	Club	Games (Goals)
1927–1928	North Melbourne	8 (1)
- ^{1} Playing statistics correct to the end of 1928.

Arthur Staveley (24 July 1908 – 3 February 1977) was an Australian rules footballer who played for the North Melbourne Football Club in the Victorian Football League (VFL).
