= Jim Kirby (footballer) =

Australian rules footballer

Personal information
- Full name: James Francis Kirby
- Born: 21 December 1922; Geelong, Victoria
- Died: 24 August 1998 (aged 75)
- Height: 169 cm (5 ft 7 in)
- Weight: 66 kg (146 lb)

Playing career^{1}
| Years | Club | Games (Goals) |
| 1946 | North Melbourne | 1 (0) |
- ^{1} Playing statistics correct to the end of 1946.

James Francis Kirby (21 December 1922 – 24 August 1998) was an Australian rules footballer who played with North Melbourne in the Victorian Football League (VFL).
