= Peter Dow =

Australian rules footballer

Personal information
- Full name: Peter Dow
- Born: 11 October 1939
- Died: 20 January 2008 (aged 68)
- Original team: Tyntynder
- Height: 183 cm (6 ft 0 in)
- Weight: 73 kg (161 lb)

Playing career^{1}
Years	Club	Games (Goals)
1959, 1961	North Melbourne	18 (8)
- ^{1} Playing statistics correct to the end of 1961.

Peter Dow (11 October 1939 – 20 January 2008) was an Australian rules footballer who played with North Melbourne in the Victorian Football League (VFL).

Peter Dow had two grandsons play AFL football with Paddy Dow at Carlton and Thomson Dow at Richmond.
