= Ian McTaggart =

Australian rules footballer

Personal information
- Full name: James Ian McTaggart
- Born: 10 May 1920; Dimboola, Victoria
- Died: 8 November 1964 (aged 44); Heidelberg West, Victoria
- Height: 185 cm (6 ft 1 in)
- Weight: 94 kg (207 lb)

Playing career^{1}
Years	Club	Games (Goals)
1941	Williamstown (VFA)	7 (8)
1942	North Melbourne	4 (5)
1945	Williamstown (VFA)	2 (0)
1945	Preston (VFA)	5 (3)
- ^{1} Playing statistics correct to the end of 1942.

James Ian McTaggart (10 May 1920 – 8 November 1964) was an Australian rules footballer who played with North Melbourne in the Victorian Football League (VFL).
