= Orm Saunders =

Australian rules footballer, born 1907

Personal information
- Full name: Ormond Henry John Saunders
- Born: 29 June 1907; Dandenong, Victoria
- Died: 22 June 1978 (aged 70); Frankston, Victoria
- Original team: Mulgrave
- Height: 178 cm (5 ft 10 in)
- Weight: 75 kg (165 lb)

Playing career^{1}
Years	Club	Games (Goals)
1928–29	North Melbourne	13 (14)
- ^{1} Playing statistics correct to the end of 1929.

Ormond Henry John Saunders (29 June 1907 – 22 June 1978) was an Australian rules footballer who played with North Melbourne in the Victorian Football League (VFL).
