= Des Rowan =

Australian rules footballer, born 1914

Personal information
- Full name: Desmond Kevin Rowan
- Born: 8 May 1914; Footscray, Victoria
- Died: 21 January 1972 (aged 57); Coburg, Victoria

Playing career^{1}
Years	Club	Games (Goals)
1935	North Melbourne	1 (1)
- ^{1} Playing statistics correct to the end of 1935.

Desmond Kevin Rowan (8 May 1914 – 21 January 1972) was an Australian rules footballer who played with North Melbourne in the Victorian Football League (VFL).
