= Bill Brodie =

Australian rules footballer, born 1908

Personal information
- Full name: Bill Brodie
- Born: 13 September 1908
- Died: 2 August 1999 (aged 90)
- Original team: Railways
- Height: 180 cm (5 ft 11 in)
- Weight: 73 kg (161 lb)

Playing career^{1}
Years	Club	Games (Goals)
1931, 1934	North Melbourne	6 (0)
- ^{1} Playing statistics correct to the end of 1934.

Bill Brodie (13 September 1908 – 2 August 1999) was an Australian rules footballer who played with North Melbourne in the Victorian Football League (VFL).

Brodie was coach of South Mildura Football Club in 1956.
