= John Moylan (footballer) =

Australian rules footballer

Personal information
- Full name: John Moylan
- Born: 11 January 1953 (age 73)
- Original teams: Dookie, University Blues
- Height: 183 cm (6 ft 0 in)
- Weight: 84 kg (185 lb)
- Position: Halfback

Playing career^{1}
Years	Club	Games (Goals)
1974–78	North Melbourne	30 (1)
1979–80	Footscray	21 (1)
Total		51 (2)
- ^{1} Playing statistics correct to the end of 1980.

John Moylan (born 11 January 1953) is a former Australian rules footballer who played with North Melbourne and Footscray in the Victorian Football League (VFL).
