= Pat Gill =

Australian rules footballer (1920–2002)

Personal information
- Full name: Pat Gill
- Born: 3 November 1920
- Died: 14 January 2002 (aged 81)
- Original team: Casterton
- Height: 173 cm (5 ft 8 in)
- Weight: 76 kg (168 lb)

Playing career^{1}
Years	Club	Games (Goals)
1946	North Melbourne	2 (0)
- ^{1} Playing statistics correct to the end of 1946.

Pat Gill (3 November 1920 – 14 January 2002) was an Australian rules footballer who played with North Melbourne in the Victorian Football League (VFL).

His father George "Leather" Gill played 7 games for Geelong in 1915.

His uncle Frank Gill who was a highly decorated player for Carlton, represented Victoria, as well being a Carlton Captain, best and fairest winner, and a premiership player in 1938.
