= Glenn Payne =

Australian rules footballer

Personal information
- Full name: Glenn Payne
- Born: 24 September 1958 (age 68)
- Height: 178 cm (5 ft 10 in)
- Weight: 76 kg (168 lb)

Playing career^{1}
Years	Club	Games (Goals)
1978–81	North Melbourne	13 (7)
- ^{1} Playing statistics correct to the end of 1981.

Glenn Payne (born 24 September 1958) is a former Australian rules footballer who played with North Melbourne in the Victorian Football League (VFL).
