= Kevin Meade =

Australian rules footballer

Personal information
- Full name: Kevin Meade
- Born: 24 March 1935 (age 91)
- Original team: St Arnaud
- Height: 178 cm (5 ft 10 in)
- Weight: 76 kg (168 lb)

Playing career^{1}
Years	Club	Games (Goals)
1957–58	North Melbourne	4 (0)
- ^{1} Playing statistics correct to the end of 1958.

Kevin Meade (born 24 March 1935) is a former Australian rules footballer who played with North Melbourne in the Victorian Football League (VFL).
