= Ted Wellington =

Australian rules footballer

Personal information
- Full name: Edward Matthew Wellington
- Born: 20 November 1921
- Died: 7 June 2004 (aged 82); Shepparton
- Height: 175 cm (5 ft 9 in)
- Weight: 74 kg (163 lb)

Playing career^{1}
Years	Club	Games (Goals)
1943	North Melbourne	1 (0)
- ^{1} Playing statistics correct to the end of 1943.

Edward Matthew Wellington (20 November 1921 – 7 June 2004) was an Australian rules footballer who played with North Melbourne in the Victorian Football League (VFL).
