= Steven Venner =

Australian rules footballer

Personal information
- Full name: Steven Venner
- Born: 5 September 1969 (age 57)

Playing career^{1}
Years	Club	Games (Goals)
1989	North Melbourne	4 (0)
- ^{1} Playing statistics correct to the end of 1989.

Steven Venner (born 5 September 1969) is a former Australian rules footballer who played for North Melbourne in the Victorian Football League (VFL) in 1989. He was recruited from Redan, Victoria, a suburb of Ballarat. After being delisted by North, Venner crossed to Williamstown in the VFA where he played 42 games and kicked 5 goals from 1992 to 1994, including the 1992 grand final against Sandringham at Princes Park.
