= John Wymer (footballer) =

Australian rules footballer

Personal information
- Full name: John Wymer
- Born: 25 January 1933
- Died: 15 June 2005 (aged 72)
- Original team: Korumburra
- Height: 192 cm (6 ft 4 in)
- Weight: 89 kg (196 lb)

Playing career^{1}
Years	Club	Games (Goals)
1955	North Melbourne	2 (0)
- ^{1} Playing statistics correct to the end of 1955.

John Wymer (25 January 1933 – 15 June 2005) was an Australian rules footballer who played with North Melbourne in the Victorian Football League (VFL).
