= Rod Dell =

Australian rules footballer

Personal information
- Born: 9 November 1946 (age 79)
- Original team: Jacana
- Height: 196 cm (6 ft 5 in)
- Weight: 87 kg (192 lb)

Playing career^{1}
Years	Club	Games (Goals)
1965–1969	North Melbourne	18 (9)
- ^{1} Playing statistics correct to the end of 1969.

Rod Dell (born 9 November 1946) is a former Australian rules football player. Dell played 18 games for North Melbourne in the Victorian Football League between 1965 and 1969.
