= Bill Thomas (footballer, born 1930) =

Australian rules footballer

Personal information
- Full name: Bill Thomas
- Born: 21 January 1930 (age 96)
- Height: 173 cm (5 ft 8 in)
- Weight: 70 kg (154 lb)

Playing career^{1}
Years	Club	Games (Goals)
1951–52	North Melbourne	4 (0)
- ^{1} Playing statistics correct to the end of 1952.

Bill Thomas (born 21 January 1930) is a former Australian rules footballer who played with North Melbourne in the Victorian Football League (VFL).
