= Vin Casey =

Australian rules footballer

Personal information
- Full name: Vincent Anthony Casey
- Born: 5 May 1918
- Died: 16 September 1981 (aged 63); Geelong, Victoria
- Height: 177 cm (5 ft 10 in)
- Weight: 74 kg (163 lb)

Playing career^{1}
| Years | Club | Games (Goals) |
| 1940–43 | North Melbourne | 8 (2) |
- ^{1} Playing statistics correct to the end of 1943.

Vincent Anthony Casey (5 May 1918 – 16 September 1981) was an Australian rules footballer who played with North Melbourne in the Victorian Football League (VFL).
