= Mowbray Weir =

Australian rules footballer, born 1908

Personal information
- Full name: Arthur Mowbray Weir
- Born: 24 November 1908; Traralgon, Victoria
- Died: 26 January 1976 (aged 67); Preston, Victoria
- Original team: Poowong
- Height: 177 cm (5 ft 10 in)
- Weight: 80 kg (176 lb)

Playing career^{1}
Years	Club	Games (Goals)
1930–31	North Melbourne	19 (10)
- ^{1} Playing statistics correct to the end of 1931.

Arthur Mowbray Weir (24 November 1908 – 26 January 1976) was an Australian rules footballer who played with North Melbourne in the Victorian Football League (VFL).

Weir later served in the Royal Australian Air Force during World War II.
