= Wally Perry =

Australian rules footballer

Personal information
- Full name: Walter Leslie Perry
- Born: 21 May 1922; Collingwood, Victoria
- Died: 20 March 2000 (aged 77)
- Height: 170 cm (5 ft 7 in)
- Weight: 65 kg (143 lb)

Playing career^{1}
Years	Club	Games (Goals)
1946	North Melbourne	2 (0)
- ^{1} Playing statistics correct to the end of 1946.

Walter Leslie Perry (21 May 1922 – 20 March 2000) was an Australian rules footballer who played with North Melbourne in the Victorian Football League (VFL).

Perry served in the Australian Army and the Royal Australian Air Force during World War II.
