= Glenn Scanlan =

Australian rules footballer

Personal information
- Full name: Glenn Lawrence Scanlan
- Born: 7 April 1956 (age 70)
- Original team: Coorparoo
- Height: 180 cm (5 ft 11 in)
- Weight: 76 kg (168 lb)

Playing career^{1}
Years	Club	Games (Goals)
1977	North Melbourne	4 (0)
1978	Footscray	5 (4)
Total		9 (4)
- ^{1} Playing statistics correct to the end of 1978.

Glenn Scanlan (born 7 April 1956) is a former Australian rules footballer who played with North Melbourne and Footscray in the Victorian Football League (VFL).
