= Harold Hooke =

Australian rules footballer, born 1911

Personal information
- Full name: Harold Hooke
- Born: 9 May 1911
- Died: 23 December 1978 (aged 67)

Playing career^{1}
Years	Club	Games (Goals)
1931	North Melbourne	11 (0)
- ^{1} Playing statistics correct to the end of 1931.

Harold Hooke (9 May 1911 – 23 December 1978) was an Australian rules footballer who played with North Melbourne in the Victorian Football League (VFL).
