= Frank Steane =

Australian rules footballer (1925–2017)

Personal information
- Full name: Francis William Steane
- Born: 22 February 1925
- Died: 4 August 2017 (aged 92); Melbourne, Victoria, Australia
- Original team: North Melbourne Colts
- Height: 164 cm (5 ft 5 in)
- Weight: 64 kg (141 lb)

Playing career^{1}
| Years | Club | Games (Goals) |
| 1946 | North Melbourne | 1 (3) |
- ^{1} Playing statistics correct to the end of 1946.

Francis William Steane (22 February 1925 – 4 August 2017) was an Australian rules footballer who played with North Melbourne in the Victorian Football League (VFL). Part of the list of players to score his first goal with his first kick. Steane died in Royal Melbourne Hospital on 4 August 2017, at the age of 92.
