= Rod Hughes (footballer, born 1946) =

Australian rules footballer

Personal information
- Full name: Rod Hughes
- Born: 21 March 1946 (age 80)
- Height: 178 cm (5 ft 10 in)
- Weight: 78 kg (172 lb)

Playing career^{1}
| Years | Club | Games (Goals) |
| 1968 | North Melbourne | 3 (0) |
- ^{1} Playing statistics correct to the end of 1968.

Rod Hughes (born 21 March 1946) is a former Australian rules footballer who played with North Melbourne in the Victorian Football League (VFL).
