= Stan Radloff =

Australian rules footballer (1919–2009)

Personal information
- Full name: Stanley Arthur Radloff
- Born: 31 July 1919; North Melbourne, Victoria
- Died: 28 May 2009 (aged 89); North Melbourne, Victoria
- Original team: Ascot Vale
- Height: 170 cm (5 ft 7 in)
- Weight: 73 kg (161 lb)
- Position: Centre

Playing career^{1}
Years	Club	Games (Goals)
1946–50	North Melbourne	60 (6)
- ^{1} Playing statistics correct to the end of 1950.

Stanley Arthur Radloff (31 July 1919 – 28 May 2009) was an Australian rules footballer who played with North Melbourne in the Victorian Football League (VFL).

Prior to playing with North Melbourne, Radloff served in the Australian Army during World War II.
