= Ron James (footballer, born 1933) =

Australian rules footballer

Personal information
- Full name: Ron James
- Born: 5 April 1933 (age 93)
- Height: 191 cm (6 ft 3 in)
- Weight: 89 kg (196 lb)

Playing career^{1}
| Years | Club | Games (Goals) |
| 1955–57 | North Melbourne | 7 (5) |
- ^{1} Playing statistics correct to the end of 1957.

Ron James (born 5 April 1933) is a former Australian rules footballer who played with North Melbourne in the Victorian Football League (VFL).
