= Roger Podolczak =

Australian rules footballer

Personal information
- Full name: Roger Peter Podolczak
- Born: 18 April 1958 (age 68)
- Original team: Sunbury
- Height: 177 cm (5 ft 10 in)
- Weight: 75 kg (165 lb)

Playing career^{1}
Years	Club	Games (Goals)
1978–81	North Melbourne	15 (13)
- ^{1} Playing statistics correct to the end of 1981.

Roger Peter Podolczak (born 18 April 1958) is a former Australian rules footballer who played with North Melbourne in the Victorian Football League (VFL). Podolczak is also an avid coin collector .
