= Ken Delaland =

Australian rules footballer

Personal information
- Full name: Ken Delaland
- Born: 1 April 1942 (age 84)
- Original team: Redan
- Height: 175 cm (5 ft 9 in)
- Weight: 80 kg (176 lb)

Playing career^{1}
Years	Club	Games (Goals)
1964	North Melbourne	1 (0)
- ^{1} Playing statistics correct to the end of 1964.

Ken Delaland (born 1 April 1942) is a former Australian rules footballer who played with North Melbourne in the Victorian Football League (VFL).
