= Viv Peterson =

Australian rules footballer

Personal information
- Full name: Vivian Bruce Peterson
- Born: 14 February 1942 (age 84)
- Original team: University High School Old Boys
- Height: 166 cm (5 ft 5 in)
- Weight: 67 kg (148 lb)

Playing career^{1}
Years	Club	Games (Goals)
1963–64	North Melbourne	8 (8)
1965	Preston (VFA)	7 (26)
- ^{1} Playing statistics correct to the end of 1964.

Vivian Bruce Peterson (born 14 February 1942) is a former Australian rules footballer who played with North Melbourne in the Victorian Football League (VFL).
