= Wolfgang Dietrich (footballer) =

Australian rules footballer

Personal information
- Full name: Wolfgang Dietrich
- Born: 20 May 1949 (age 77)
- Original team: Brunswick
- Height: 185 cm (6 ft 1 in)
- Weight: 81 kg (179 lb)

Playing career^{1}
Years	Club	Games (Goals)
1970	North Melbourne	5 (0)
- ^{1} Playing statistics correct to the end of 1970.

Wolfgang Dietrich (born 20 May 1949) is a former Australian rules footballer who played with North Melbourne in the Victorian Football League (VFL).
