= Barrie Somerville =

Australian rules footballer

Personal information
- Full name: Barrie Somerville
- Born: 5 March 1941 (age 85)
- Original team: Lucknow
- Height: 174 cm (5 ft 9 in)
- Weight: 63 kg (139 lb)

Playing career^{1}
Years	Club	Games (Goals)
1958	North Melbourne	3 (1)
- ^{1} Playing statistics correct to the end of 1958.

Barrie Somerville (born 5 March 1941) is a former Australian rules footballer who played for the North Melbourne Football Club in the Victorian Football League (VFL).

Somerville was only 17 when he played his three games of VFL football. He had been recruited from Lucknow in the Bairnsdale District FL after he kicked 119 goals in the 1957 season.

City life didn't agree with him and he eventually returned to Lucknow. In 1964 and 1965 he again topped the Bairnsdale DFL goalkicking for Lucknow.
