= Brian Backhouse =

Australian rules footballer

Personal information
- Full name: Brian Backhouse
- Born: 7 May 1948
- Died: 13 September 2003 (aged 55)
- Original team: Colac Imperials
- Height: 177 cm (5 ft 10 in)
- Weight: 73 kg (161 lb)

Playing career^{1}
Years	Club	Games (Goals)
1968	North Melbourne	6 (2)
- ^{1} Playing statistics correct to the end of 1968.

Brian Backhouse (7 May 1948 – 13 September 2003) was an Australian rules footballer who played with North Melbourne in the Victorian Football League (VFL).

Backhouse, a rover, was recruited from Colac Imperials. He made six league appearances for North Melbourne, all in the 1968 VFL season. At the end of the year he was delisted by North Melbourne and later played at Waverley.
