= Ken Snell =

Australian rules footballer

Personal information
- Full name: Ken Snell
- Born: 15 August 1942
- Original team: Glenroy
- Height: 185 cm (6 ft 1 in)
- Weight: 72 kg (159 lb)
- Position: Half Forward

Playing career^{1}
Years	Club	Games (Goals)
1960–65	North Melbourne	56 (21)
- ^{1} Playing statistics correct to the end of 1965.

Ken Snell (born 15 August 1942) is a former Australian rules footballer who played with North Melbourne in the Victorian Football League (VFL).
