= Hugh Carroll =

Australian rules footballer, born 1909

Personal information
- Full name: Hugh Carroll
- Born: 28 May 1909
- Died: 21 July 1969 (aged 60)
- Original team: Ultima
- Height: 178 cm (5 ft 10 in)
- Weight: 85 kg (187 lb)

Playing career^{1}
Years	Club	Games (Goals)
1932	North Melbourne	9 (1)
- ^{1} Playing statistics correct to the end of 1932.

Hugh Carroll (28 May 1909 – 21 July 1969) was an Australian rules footballer who played with North Melbourne in the Victorian Football League (VFL).
