= Wal McGrath =

Australian rules footballer, born 1910

Personal information
- Full name: Walter Ernest Edward McGrath
- Born: 9 June 1910; Kiewa, Victoria
- Died: 6 October 1999 (aged 89); Tallangatta, Victoria

Playing career^{1}
Years	Club	Games (Goals)
1930	North Melbourne	2 (1)
- ^{1} Playing statistics correct to the end of 1930.

Walter Ernest Edward McGrath (9 June 1910 – 6 October 1999) was an Australian rules footballer who played with North Melbourne in the Victorian Football League (VFL).
