= Bob Pattinson =

Australian rules footballer

Personal information
- Full name: Robert David Pattinson
- Born: 14 May 1933
- Died: 2 November 1963 (aged 30)
- Original team: Coburg Juniors
- Height: 177 cm (5 ft 10 in)
- Weight: 76 kg (168 lb)

Playing career^{1}
| Years | Club | Games (Goals) |
| 1957 | North Melbourne | 1 (0) |
- ^{1} Playing statistics correct to the end of 1957.

Robert David Pattinson (14 May 1933 – 2 November 1963) was an Australian rules footballer who played with North Melbourne in the Victorian Football League (VFL). In the Victorian Football League, he was the 6,853rd player to appear, and he was the 494th player to play in the VFL for North Melbourne.
