= Joe McElholum =

Australian rules footballer, born 1910

Personal information
- Full name: Joseph McElholum
- Born: 6 April 1910; North Melbourne, Victoria
- Died: 15 August 1998 (aged 88); Deniliquin, New South Wales
- Height: 179 cm (5 ft 10 in)
- Weight: 78 kg (172 lb)

Playing career^{1}
Years	Club	Games (Goals)
1930–31	North Melbourne	8 (2)
1932	Yarraville (VFA)	4 (1)
- ^{1} Playing statistics correct to the end of 1932.

Joseph McElholum (6 April 1910 – 15 August 1998) was an Australian rules footballer who played with North Melbourne in the Victorian Football League (VFL).

McElohum later served in the Australian Army for three years during World War II.
