= Lindsay Baglin =

Australian rules footballer

Personal information
- Full name: Lindsay Gordon Baglin
- Born: 2 March 1929 (age 97)
- Original team: Newport / Williamstown Presbyterians
- Height: 180 cm (5 ft 11 in)
- Weight: 73 kg (161 lb)

Playing career^{1}
Years	Club	Games (Goals)
1947	Footscray	1 (0)
1949	North Melbourne	5 (2)
Total		6 (2)
- ^{1} Playing statistics correct to the end of 1949.

Lindsay Gordon 'Don' Baglin (born 2 March 1929) is a former Australian rules footballer who played with Footscray and North Melbourne in the Victorian Football League (VFL).
