= Tony May =

Australian rules footballer (born 1954)

Personal information
- Full name: Tony May
- Born: 17 May 1954 (age 72)
- Original team: Maryborough
- Height: 187 cm (6 ft 2 in)
- Weight: 85.5 kg (188 lb)

Playing career^{1}
Years	Club	Games (Goals)
1977	North Melbourne	2 (0)
1978	Melbourne	2 (1)
Total		4 (1)
- ^{1} Playing statistics correct to the end of 1978.

Tony May (born 17 May 1954) is a former Australian rules footballer who played with North Melbourne and Melbourne in the Victorian Football League (VFL).
