= Bob Goode =

Australian rules footballer (born 1943)

Personal information
- Full name: Bob Goode
- Born: 28 October 1943 (age 83)
- Original team: Yarrawonga
- Height: 183 cm (6 ft 0 in)
- Weight: 81 kg (179 lb)

Playing career^{1}
Years	Club	Games (Goals)
1963–66	North Melbourne	20 (0)
- ^{1} Playing statistics correct to the end of 1966.

Bob Goode (born 28 October 1943) is a former Australian rules footballer who played with North Melbourne in the Victorian Football League (VFL).
