= Eric Parkes =

Australian rules footballer

Personal information
- Full name: Ronald Eric Parkes
- Born: 30 September 1926; Yarraville, Victoria
- Died: 20 July 2004 (aged 77)
- Original team: Yarraville
- Height: 178 cm (5 ft 10 in)
- Weight: 72 kg (159 lb)
- Position: Defense

Playing career^{1}
| Years | Club | Games (Goals) |
| 1949–55 | North Melbourne | 74 (2) |
- ^{1} Playing statistics correct to the end of 1955.

Ronald Eric Parkes (30 September 1926 – 20 July 2004) was an Australian rules footballer who played with North Melbourne in the Victorian Football League (VFL).
