= Ray Clarke (Australian footballer) =

Australian rules footballer

Personal information
- Full name: Raymond George Clarke
- Born: 19 July 1908; Toora, Victoria
- Died: 23 October 1971 (aged 63); Maryborough, Queensland

Playing career^{1}
Years	Club	Games (Goals)
1930	North Melbourne	1 (0)
- ^{1} Playing statistics correct to the end of 1930.

Raymond George Clarke (19 July 1908 – 23 October 1971) was an Australian rules footballer who played with North Melbourne in the Victorian Football League (VFL).
