= Peter Robinson (Australian footballer) =

Australian rules footballer

Personal information
- Full name: Peter Robinson
- Born: 15 February 1953 (age 73)
- Original team: Jacana
- Height: 185 cm (6 ft 1 in)
- Weight: 86 kg (190 lb)

Playing career^{1}
Years	Club	Games (Goals)
1972	North Melbourne	9 (1)
- ^{1} Playing statistics correct to the end of 1972.

Peter Robinson (born 15 February 1953) is a former Australian rules footballer who played with North Melbourne in the Victorian Football League (VFL).
