= Brendan Mutimer =

Australian rules footballer

Personal information
- Full name: Brendan Mutimer
- Born: 19 October 1963 (age 63)
- Original team: Boronia
- Height: 182 cm (6 ft 0 in)
- Weight: 75 kg (165 lb)

Playing career^{1}
Years	Club	Games (Goals)
1984	North Melbourne	7 (3)
- ^{1} Playing statistics correct to the end of 1984.

Brendan Mutimer (born 19 October 1963) is a retired Australian rules footballer who played for North Melbourne in the Victorian Football League (VFL).
