= Norm Dugdell =

Australian rules footballer, born 1906

Personal information
- Full name: Norm Dugdell
- Born: 17 November 1906
- Died: 10 January 1979 (aged 72)
- Height: 174 cm (5 ft 9 in)
- Weight: 75 kg (165 lb)

Playing career^{1}
Years	Club	Games (Goals)
1928–29	North Melbourne	6 (8)
- ^{1} Playing statistics correct to the end of 1929.

Norm Dugdell (17 November 1906 – 10 January 1979) was an Australian rules footballer who played with North Melbourne in the Victorian Football League (VFL).
