= Jacky Lock =

Australian rules footballer, born 1901

Personal information
- Full name: Jack Oak Lock
- Born: 29 March 1901; Kensington, Victoria, Australia
- Died: 11 August 1965 (aged 64); Parkville, Victoria, Australia
- Height: 174 cm (5 ft 9 in)
- Weight: 79 kg (174 lb)

Playing career^{1}
Years	Club	Games (Goals)
1925–28	North Melbourne	36 (3)
- ^{1} Playing statistics correct to the end of 1928.

Jack Oak Lock (29 March 1901 – 11 August 1965) was an Australian rules footballer who played with North Melbourne in the Victorian Football Association (VFA) and in the Victorian Football League (VFL), and with Williamstown Football Club in the Victorian Football Association (VFA).

== Family ==
The son of Alfred Samuel Francis Lock (1870-1937), and Mary Ann Lock (1868-1939), née Wood, Jack Oak Lock was born in Kensington, Victoria on 29 March 1901.

He married Euphemia Victoria Bowen, née McNaughton, in 1940.

== Football ==
=== North Melbourne (VFA) ===
Recruited from the North Melbourne Juniors (VJFA) in 1921.

=== North Melbourne (VFL) ===
He played on the wing in North Melbourne's first-ever match in the VFL — against Geelong on 2 May 1925.

=== Williamstown (VFA) ===
On 9 April 1930 he was cleared from North Melbourne to Williamstown. He only played in three matches, and was one of the 38 different players who played in the team's 21 matches in the 1930 season.
