= Robin Poole =

Australian rules footballer

Personal information
- Full name: Robin Cornelius Poole
- Born: 10 January 1938 (age 88)
- Original team: Tyntynder
- Height: 179 cm (5 ft 10 in)
- Weight: 81 kg (179 lb)

Playing career^{1}
Years	Club	Games (Goals)
1959–61	North Melbourne	28 (0)
- ^{1} Playing statistics correct to the end of 1961.

Robin Cornelius Poole (born 10 January 1938) is a former Australian rules footballer who played with North Melbourne in the Victorian Football League (VFL).
