= Ron Rann =

Australian rules footballer, born 1913

Personal information
- Full name: Ronald John Rann
- Born: 25 August 1913; Footscray, Victoria
- Died: 20 March 2006 (aged 92); Perth, Western Australia
- Height: 180 cm (5 ft 11 in)
- Weight: 66 kg (146 lb)

Playing career^{1}
Years	Club	Games (Goals)
1938–39	North Melbourne	6 (0)
1940–41, 1945	Yarraville (VFA)	
- ^{1} Playing statistics correct to the end of 1945.

Ronald John Rann (25 August 1913 – 20 March 2006) was an Australian rules footballer who played with North Melbourne in the Victorian Football League (VFL).
