= Bill McIntosh =

Australian rules footballer

Personal information
- Full name: William George McIntosh
- Born: 2 November 1898; North Melbourne, Victoria
- Died: 25 June 1963 (aged 64); Parkville, Victoria

Playing career^{1}
Years	Club	Games (Goals)
1925	North Melbourne	6 (0)
- ^{1} Playing statistics correct to the end of 1925.

William George McIntosh (2 November 1898 – 25 June 1963) was an Australian rules footballer who played with North Melbourne in the Victorian Football League (VFL).
