= Bob Wright (Australian footballer) =

Australian rules footballer (1943–2019)

Personal information
- Full name: Bob Wright
- Born: 8 January 1943
- Died: 24 October 2019 (aged 76)
- Original team: Brunswick City
- Height: 188 cm (6 ft 2 in)
- Weight: 80 kg (176 lb)

Playing career^{1}
Years	Club	Games (Goals)
1963	North Melbourne	1 (0)
- ^{1} Playing statistics correct to the end of 1963.

Bob Wright (8 January 1943 – 24 October 2019) was an Australian rules footballer who played with North Melbourne in the Victorian Football League (VFL).
