= Rod Ward =

Australian rules footballer

Personal information
- Full name: Rod Ward
- Born: 28 October 1937 (age 89)
- Original team: Glenroy
- Height: 183 cm (6 ft 0 in)
- Weight: 73 kg (161 lb)

Playing career^{1}
Years	Club	Games (Goals)
1961–62	North Melbourne	15 (12)
- ^{1} Playing statistics correct to the end of 1962.

Rod Ward (born 28 October 1937) is a former Australian rules footballer who played with North Melbourne in the Victorian Football League (VFL).
