= Mick Maroney =

Australian rules footballer, born 1910

Personal information
- Full name: Michael Francis Maroney
- Born: 1 November 1910; Wangaratta, Victoria
- Died: 5 March 1972 (aged 61); Dandenong, Victoria
- Original team: Wangaratta

Playing career^{1}
Years	Club	Games (Goals)
1935	North Melbourne	1 (0)
- ^{1} Playing statistics correct to the end of 1935.

Michael Francis Maroney (1 November 1910 – 5 March 1972) was an Australian rules footballer who played with North Melbourne in the Victorian Football League (VFL).

Maroney was a leading sprinter in his youth, notably winning the Wangaratta Gift as an 18 year old in 1930.

He later served in the Australian Army during World War II.
