= Barry McAuliffe =

Australian rules footballer (born 1943)

Personal information
- Full name: Barry McAuliffe
- Born: 18 October 1943 (age 83)
- Original team: University High School
- Height: 183 cm (6 ft 0 in)
- Weight: 79 kg (174 lb)

Playing career^{1}
Years	Club	Games (Goals)
1962–1966	North Melbourne	41 (0)
- ^{1} Playing statistics correct to the end of 1966.

Barry McAuliffe (born 18 October 1943) is a former Australian rules footballer who played for the North Melbourne Football Club in the Victorian Football League (VFL).
