= Brendan Burnett =

Australian rules footballer

Personal information
- Full name: Brendan Burnett
- Born: 2 August 1957 (age 69)
- Original team: Assumption
- Height: 182 cm (6 ft 0 in)
- Weight: 77 kg (170 lb)

Playing career^{1}
Years	Club	Games (Goals)
1978	North Melbourne	6 (0)
- ^{1} Playing statistics correct to the end of 1978.

Brendan Burnett (born 2 August 1957) is a former Australian rules footballer who played with North Melbourne in the Victorian Football League (VFL).
