= Les Cameron =

Australian rules footballer

Personal information
- Full name: Les Cameron
- Born: 18 June 1946 (age 80)
- Original team: St Albans
- Height: 183 cm (6 ft 0 in)
- Weight: 83 kg (183 lb)

Playing career^{1}
Years	Club	Games (Goals)
1967–68	North Melbourne	4 (0)
- ^{1} Playing statistics correct to the end of 1968.

Les Cameron (born 18 June 1946) is a former Australian rules footballer who played with North Melbourne in the Victorian Football League (VFL).

Following the end of his VFL career, Cameron played for Birchip in the North Central Football League.
