= Bill Jory =

Australian rules footballer, born 1919

Personal information
- Full name: William Brian Jory
- Born: 26 April 1919; Natimuk, Victoria
- Died: 27 December 2007 (aged 88)
- Height: 173 cm (5 ft 8 in)
- Weight: 73 kg (161 lb)

Playing career^{1}
Years	Club	Games (Goals)
1938	North Melbourne	1 (1)
- ^{1} Playing statistics correct to the end of 1938.

William Brian Jory (26 April 1919 – 27 December 2007) was an Australian rules footballer who played with North Melbourne in the Victorian Football League (VFL).
