= Merv Williams =

Australian rules footballer

Personal information
- Full name: Merv Williams
- Born: 18 December 1937
- Died: 16 November 2014 (aged 76)
- Original team: Flemington / Kensington
- Height: 191 cm (6 ft 3 in)
- Weight: 99 kg (218 lb)

Playing career^{1}
Years	Club	Games (Goals)
1957–58	North Melbourne	7 (4)
- ^{1} Playing statistics correct to the end of 1958.

Merv Williams (18 December 1937 – 16 November 2014) was an Australian rules footballer who played with North Melbourne in the Victorian Football League (VFL). He transferred to Williamstown in 1961 and played with the Seagulls until the end of 1966, totaling 72 games and 79 goals. He appeared in the losing VFA grand finals of 1961 and 1964 against Yarraville and Port Melbourne, respectively. He was awarded 'Town's best utility player award in 1962 and was later Seconds coach and assistant coach to Ted Whitten in 1975.
