= Joe Kirkley =

Australian rules footballer, born 1903

Personal information
- Full name: Joseph Kirkley
- Born: 13 April 1903; Carlton, Victoria
- Died: 14 February 1971 (aged 67); Wagga Wagga, New South Wales

Playing career^{1}
Years	Club	Games (Goals)
1925–26	North Melbourne	2 (0)
- ^{1} Playing statistics correct to the end of 1926.

Joseph Kirkley (13 April 1903 – 14 February 1971) was an Australian rules footballer who played with North Melbourne in the Victorian Football League (VFL).
