= Bill McMaster (footballer, born 1922) =

Australian rules footballer

Personal information
- Full name: William Harold McMaster
- Born: 15 March 1922; Flemington, Victoria
- Died: 3 October 2017 (aged 95)
- Height: 179 cm (5 ft 10 in)
- Weight: 80 kg (176 lb)

Playing career^{1}
Years	Club	Games (Goals)
1946	North Melbourne	3 (0)
- ^{1} Playing statistics correct to the end of 1946.

William Harold McMaster (15 March 1922 – 3 October 2017) was an Australian rules footballer who played with North Melbourne in the Victorian Football League (VFL).

Prior to his VFL career, he served in the Australian Army in World War II.
