= Frank Connellan =

Australian rules footballer

Personal information
- Full name: Frank Connellan
- Born: 4 January 1923
- Died: 28 September 1998 (aged 75)
- Original team: West Melbourne
- Height: 188 cm (6 ft 2 in)
- Weight: 86 kg (190 lb)

Playing career^{1}
Years	Club	Games (Goals)
1946–47	North Melbourne	29 (10)
- ^{1} Playing statistics correct to the end of 1947.

Frank Connellan (4 January 1923 – 28 September 1998) was an Australian rules footballer who played with North Melbourne in the Victorian Football League (VFL).
