= Harry Somerville =

Australian rules footballer

Personal information
- Full name: Harold John Somerville
- Born: 2 July 1923; Warrnambool, Victoria
- Died: 21 January 1998 (aged 74)
- Original team: Warrnambool
- Height: 170 cm (5 ft 7 in)
- Weight: 72 kg (159 lb)

Playing career^{1}
Years	Club	Games (Goals)
1947	North Melbourne	6 (8)
- ^{1} Playing statistics correct to the end of 1947.

Harold John Somerville (2 July 1923 – 21 January 1998) was an Australian rules footballer who played with North Melbourne in the Victorian Football League (VFL).
