= Bill Stevens (footballer, born 1908) =

Australian rules footballer

Personal information
- Full name: Bill Stevens
- Born: 8 June 1908
- Died: 11 August 1981 (aged 73)
- Original team: Preston

Playing career^{1}
Years	Club	Games (Goals)
1927	North Melbourne	6 (12)
- ^{1} Playing statistics correct to the end of 1927.

Bill Stevens (8 June 1908 – 11 August 1981) was an Australian rules footballer who played with North Melbourne in the Victorian Football League (VFL).
