= Warren Mercer =

Australian rules footballer

Personal information
- Full name: Warren Mercer
- Born: 15 December 1941
- Died: 26 August 1975 (aged 33)
- Original team: Mentone
- Height: 174 cm (5 ft 9 in)
- Weight: 69 kg (152 lb)

Playing career^{1}
Years	Club	Games (Goals)
1959	North Melbourne	1 (0)
- ^{1} Playing statistics correct to the end of 1959.

Warren Mercer (15 December 1941 – 26 August 1975) was an Australian rules footballer who played with North Melbourne in the Victorian Football League (VFL).
