= Ivor Witnish =

Australian rules footballer

Personal information
- Full name: Ivor Witnish
- Born: 23 May 1934 (age 92)
- Original team: Yarraburn
- Height: 171 cm (5 ft 7 in)
- Weight: 64 kg (141 lb)

Playing career^{1}
| Years | Club | Games (Goals) |
| 1957 | North Melbourne | 3 (0) |
- ^{1} Playing statistics correct to the end of 1957.

Ivor Witnish (born 23 May 1934) is a former Australian rules footballer who played with North Melbourne in the Victorian Football League (VFL).
