= Ron Montgomery =

Australian rules footballer

Personal information
- Full name: Ron Montgomery
- Born: 25 July 1952 (age 74)
- Original team: Oak Park
- Height: 188 cm (6 ft 2 in)
- Weight: 90 kg (198 lb)

Playing career^{1}
Years	Club	Games (Goals)
1972	North Melbourne	1 (0)
- ^{1} Playing statistics correct to the end of 1972.

Ron Montgomery (born 25 July 1952) is a former Australian rules footballer who played with North Melbourne in the Victorian Football League (VFL).
