= Ray Wynd =

Australian rules footballer

Personal information
- Full name: Ray Wynd
- Born: 6 January 1921
- Died: 19 February 2003 (aged 82)
- Height: 173 cm (5 ft 8 in)
- Weight: 76 kg (168 lb)

Playing career^{1}
Years	Club	Games (Goals)
1940–41	North Melbourne	4 (3)
- ^{1} Playing statistics correct to the end of 1941.

Ray Wynd (6 January 1921 – 19 February 2003) was an Australian rules footballer who played with North Melbourne in the Victorian Football League (VFL).
