= Garmah Jones =

Australian rules footballer, born 1915

Personal information
- Full name: Thomas Togarmah Jones
- Born: 21 February 1915; Horsham, Victoria
- Died: 20 December 1998 (aged 83)
- Original team: Pascoe Vale South
- Height: 178 cm (5 ft 10 in)
- Weight: 73 kg (161 lb)

Playing career^{1}
Years	Club	Games (Goals)
1936	North Melbourne	1 (0)
- ^{1} Playing statistics correct to the end of 1936.

Thomas Togarmah Jones (21 February 1915 – 20 December 1998) was an Australian rules footballer who played with North Melbourne in the Victorian Football League (VFL).
