= Reginald Taylor (engineer) =

Sir Reginald William Taylor, CMG (1 December 1895 – 19 October 1971), known informally as Rex Taylor, was a British civil engineer and civil servant who worked in several British colonies.

== Early life and education ==
Reginald William Taylor was born on 1 December 1895 to John Edward Taylor and his wife Mary Houldsworth, née Alexander. He attended St Lawrence College in Ramsgate before studying at University College London, graduating with a Bachelor of Science degree.

== Career ==
After serving in France during the First World War, he began working for the Public Works Department in the Uganda Protectorate in 1921. He moved to the equivalent department in Colonial Nigeria in 1938, and became Director of Public Works in that colony from 1947 to 1951, when he became Director of Public Works in the Colony and Protectorate of Kenya. In 1954, he became Engineer-in-Chief to the Crown Agents for Overseas Governments and Administrations, before retiring in 1961. His publications included Aerodrome Construction (1945) and Nigerian Highways (1951).

Taylor was appointed a Companion of the Order of St Michael and St George in 1951 and a Knight Bachelor seven years later. He died on 19 October 1971, survived by his wife, Ruth du Boulay, daughter of Dr W. J. Tyson, FRCP, FRCS. They had two sons, including the academic Jonathan Taylor. Sir George Seel wrote in an obituary of Taylor in The Times that he was "a widely experienced and talented civil engineer".
