= Ray Davies (footballer, born 1946) =

Australian rules footballer

Personal information
- Full name: Ray Davies
- Born: 18 April 1946 (age 80)
- Height: 183 cm (6 ft 0 in)
- Weight: 75 kg (165 lb)

Playing career^{1}
Years	Club	Games (Goals)
1965–68	North Melbourne	25 (1)
- ^{1} Playing statistics correct to the end of 1968.

Ray Davies (born 18 April 1946) is a former Australian rules footballer who played with North Melbourne in the Victorian Football League (VFL).
