= Billy Smith (Australian footballer) =

Australian rules footballer

Personal information
- Full name: Billy Smith
- Born: 31 July 1894
- Died: 28 August 1953 (aged 59)
- Height: 184 cm (6 ft 0 in)
- Weight: 87 kg (192 lb)

Playing career^{1}
Years	Club	Games (Goals)
1925–26	North Melbourne	12 (1)
- ^{1} Playing statistics correct to the end of 1926.

Billy Smith (31 July 1894 – 28 August 1953) was an Australian rules footballer who played with North Melbourne in the Victorian Football League (VFL).
