= Brian Cahill (footballer) =

Australian rules footballer

Personal information
- Full name: Brian Cahill
- Born: 22 November 1938
- Died: 28 July 1999 (aged 62)
- Position: Full-forward

Playing career^{1}
Years	Club	Games (Goals)
1958–61	North Melbourne	23 (10)
- ^{1} Playing statistics correct to the end of 1961.

Brian Cahill (22 November 1938 – 28 July 1999) was an Australian rules footballer who played with North Melbourne in the Victorian Football League (VFL).

After leaving North Melbourne, Cahill joined Brunswick in the Victorian Football Association.
