= Jack Boldiston =

Australian rules footballer

Personal information
- Full name: John Walter Boldiston
- Born: 26 April 1921
- Died: 7 January 2015 (aged 93)
- Original team: Hawthorn Methodists
- Height: 179 cm (5 ft 10 in)
- Weight: 84 kg (185 lb)

Playing career^{1}
Years	Club	Games (Goals)
1943	North Melbourne	7 (0)
- ^{1} Playing statistics correct to the end of 1943.

John Walter Boldiston (26 April 1921 – 7 January 2015) was an Australian rules footballer who played with North Melbourne in the Victorian Football League (VFL).
