= Ian Lasslett =

Australian rules footballer

Personal information
- Full name: Ian Frank Lasslett
- Born: 7 August 1949 (age 77)
- Original team: Upwey-Tecoma
- Height: 184 cm (6 ft 0 in)
- Weight: 79 kg (174 lb)

Playing career^{1}
| Years | Club | Games (Goals) |
| 1971 | North Melbourne | 2 (0) |
- ^{1} Playing statistics correct to the end of 1971.

Ian Lasslett (born 7 August 1949) is a former Australian rules footballer who played with North Melbourne in the Victorian Football League (VFL).
