= Barry Goring =

Australian rules footballer

Personal information
- Full name: Barry Goring
- Born: 26 November 1940 (age 85)
- Original team: North Colts
- Height: 184 cm (6 ft 0 in)
- Weight: 85 kg (187 lb)

Playing career^{1}
Years	Club	Games (Goals)
1960	North Melbourne	12 (0)
- ^{1} Playing statistics correct to the end of 1960.

Barry Goring (born 26 November 1940) is a former Australian rules footballer who played for the North Melbourne Football Club in the Victorian Football League (VFL).
