= Frank Ludlow (footballer) =

Australian rules footballer, born 1902

Personal information
- Full name: Frank Ludlow
- Born: 17 April 1902
- Died: 3 June 1957 (aged 55)
- Original team: Northcote
- Height: 185 cm (6 ft 1 in)
- Weight: 79 kg (174 lb)

Playing career^{1}
Years	Club	Games (Goals)
1929	North Melbourne	3 (5)
- ^{1} Playing statistics correct to the end of 1929.

Frank Ludlow (17 April 1902 – 3 June 1957) was an Australian rules footballer who played with North Melbourne in the Victorian Football League (VFL).
