= Barney Howard =

Australian rules footballer

Personal information
- Full name: Barney Howard
- Born: 11 November 1941 (age 84)
- Original team: Ulverstone
- Height: 185 cm (6 ft 1 in)
- Weight: 83 kg (183 lb)

Playing career^{1}
Years	Club	Games (Goals)
1962	North Melbourne	2 (1)
- ^{1} Playing statistics correct to the end of 1962.

Barney Howard (born 11 November 1941) is a former Australian rules footballer who played for the North Melbourne Football Club in the Victorian Football League (VFL).
