= Les Crosbie =

Australian rules footballer, born 1914

Personal information
- Full name: Leslie James Crosbie
- Born: 21 September 1914; Victoria
- Died: 14 October 2006 (aged 92); Southport, QLD
- Original team: Northcote
- Height: 184 cm (6 ft 0 in)
- Weight: 93 kg (205 lb)
- Position: Ruck

Playing career^{1}
Years	Club	Games (Goals)
1941–44	North Melbourne	44 (1)
- ^{1} Playing statistics correct to the end of 1944.

Les Crosbie (21 September 1914 – 14 October 2006) was an Australian rules footballer who played with North Melbourne in the Victorian Football League (VFL).
