= Tom Carey (footballer) =

Australian rules footballer

Personal information
- Full name: Thomas Anthony Carey
- Born: 9 June 1941
- Died: 18 May 2009 (aged 67)
- Original team: Shepparton United
- Height: 185 cm (6 ft 1 in)
- Weight: 76 kg (168 lb)

Playing career^{1}
Years	Club	Games (Goals)
1961	North Melbourne	1 (0)
- ^{1} Playing statistics correct to the end of 1961.

Thomas Anthony Carey (9 June 1941 – 18 May 2009) was an Australian rules footballer who played with North Melbourne in the Victorian Football League (VFL).
