= Dick Hallo =

Australian rules footballer

Personal information
- Full name: Dick Hallo
- Born: 31 January 1941
- Died: 20 June 2009 (aged 68)
- Height: 188 cm (6 ft 2 in)
- Weight: 86 kg (190 lb)

Playing career^{1}
Years	Club	Games (Goals)
1964	North Melbourne	8 (0)
- ^{1} Playing statistics correct to the end of 1964.

Dick Hallo (31 January 1941 – 20 June 2009) was an Australian rules footballer who played with North Melbourne in the Victorian Football League (VFL).
