= Mick Evans =

Australian rules footballer

Personal information
- Full name: Mick Evans
- Born: 22 July 1947 (age 79)
- Original team: North Colts
- Height: 173 cm (5 ft 8 in)
- Weight: 70 kg (154 lb)

Playing career^{1}
Years	Club	Games (Goals)
1967–68	North Melbourne	14 (22)
- ^{1} Playing statistics correct to the end of 1968.

Mick Evans (born 22 July 1947) is a former Australian rules footballer who played with North Melbourne in the Victorian Football League (VFL).

Following his departure from North Melbourne, Evans played for Portland Football Club in the Western Border Football League.

Currently he is working as a Consultant for Granite Consulting.
