= Les Jacobs =

Australian rules footballer, born 1913

Personal information
- Full name: Les Jacobs
- Born: 10 June 1913
- Died: 22 September 2004 (aged 91)
- Original team: Brunswick
- Height: 180 cm (5 ft 11 in)
- Weight: 73 kg (161 lb)

Playing career^{1}
Years	Club	Games (Goals)
1938	North Melbourne	3 (0)
- ^{1} Playing statistics correct to the end of 1938.

Les Jacobs (10 June 1913 – 22 September 2004) was an Australian rules footballer who played with North Melbourne in the Victorian Football League (VFL).
