= Eric Haggis =

Australian rules footballer, born 1915

Personal information
- Full name: Eric Alfred Haggis
- Born: 29 April 1915; Beaufort, Victoria
- Died: 6 March 1964 (aged 48)
- Height: 178 cm (5 ft 10 in)
- Weight: 87 kg (192 lb)

Playing career^{1}
Years	Club	Games (Goals)
1944	North Melbourne	4 (0)
- ^{1} Playing statistics correct to the end of 1944.

Eric Alfred Haggis (29 April 1915 – 6 March 1964) was an Australian rules footballer who played with North Melbourne in the Victorian Football League (VFL).
