= Paul Clarke (Australian footballer) =

Australian rules footballer, born 1909

Personal information
- Full name: Paul Edward Clarke
- Born: 23 January 1909; Geelong, Victoria
- Died: 12 November 1969 (aged 60); Parkville, Victoria
- Original team: University / Geelong College

Playing career^{1}
Years	Club	Games (Goals)
1930	North Melbourne	1 (0)
- ^{1} Playing statistics correct to the end of 1930.

Paul Edward Clarke (23 January 1909 – 12 November 1969) was an Australian rules footballer who played with North Melbourne in the Victorian Football League (VFL).
