= Alf Lambe =

Australian rules footballer, born 1904

Personal information
- Full name: Alfred James Lambe
- Born: 28 June 1904; Collingwood, Victoria
- Died: 29 April 1976 (aged 71); Parkville, Victoria
- Height: 177 cm (5 ft 10 in)
- Weight: 74 kg (163 lb)
- Position: Defence

Playing career^{1}
| Years | Club | Games (Goals) |
| 1925–1928 | North Melbourne | 58 (2) |
| 1931–1932 | Footscray | 32 (0) |
| Total | | 90 (2) |
- ^{1} Playing statistics correct to the end of 1932.

Alfred James Lambe (28 June 1904 – 29 April 1976) was an Australian rules footballer who played for the North Melbourne Football Club and Footscray Football Club in the Victorian Football League (VFL).
