= Ken McKernan =

Australian rules footballer

Personal information
- Full name: Kenneth Ferguson McKernan
- Born: 9 August 1911; Shepparton, Victoria
- Died: September 2009 (age 98); Surfers Paradise, Queensland
- Height: 182 cm (6 ft 0 in)
- Weight: 79 kg (174 lb)

Playing career^{1}
| Years | Club | Games (Goals) |
| 1934–35 | North Melbourne | 3 (1) |
- ^{1} Playing statistics correct to the end of 1935.

Kenneth Ferguson McKernan (9 August 1911 – September 2009) was an Australian rules footballer who played with North Melbourne in the Victorian Football League (VFL).
