= Colin Seery =

Australian rules footballer

Personal information
- Full name: Colin Joseph Seery
- Born: 1 October 1957 (age 69)
- Original team: St Albans
- Height: 182 cm (6 ft 0 in)
- Weight: 77 kg (170 lb)

Playing career^{1}
Years	Club	Games (Goals)
1976	North Melbourne	2 (3)
1980–81	Footscray	11 (4)
Total		13 (7)
- ^{1} Playing statistics correct to the end of 1981.

Colin Seery (born 1 October 1957) is a former Australian rules footballer who played with North Melbourne and Footscray in the Victorian Football League (VFL).
