= Bill Reddick (footballer) =

Australian rules footballer

Personal information
- Full name: William Thomas Reddick
- Born: 11 November 1935
- Died: 17 July 2008 (aged 72)
- Height: 183 cm (6 ft 0 in)
- Weight: 92 kg (203 lb)

Playing career^{1}
Years	Club	Games (Goals)
1955–56	North Melbourne	12 (0)
- ^{1} Playing statistics correct to the end of 1956.

William Thomas Reddick (11 November 1935 – 17 July 2008) was an Australian rules footballer who played with North Melbourne in the Victorian Football League (VFL).
