= Reg Taylor =

Australian rules footballer, born 1910

Personal information
- Full name: William Reginald Taylor
- Born: 19 March 1908; Eaglehawk, Victoria
- Died: 5 August 1982 (aged 74); Kew, Victoria
- Original team: Williamstown
- Height: 173 cm (5 ft 8 in)
- Weight: 70 kg (154 lb)

Playing career^{1}
Years	Club	Games (Goals)
1932–35	Williamstown (VFA)	57 (6)
1936	North Melbourne	3 (0)
1936–38	Williamstown (VFA)	35 (1)
- ^{1} Playing statistics correct to the end of 1938.

William Reginald Taylor (19 March 1908 – 5 August 1982) was an Australian rules footballer who played with North Melbourne in the Victorian Football League (VFL) and Williamstown in the Victorian Football Association (VFA).

== Family ==
The son of Thomas Edgar Taylor (1885-1931) and Ildica Eunice "Hilda" Taylor (1889-1953), née Phillips, later Mrs. William Robert Keam, Williams Reginald Taylor was born at Eaglehawk, Victoria on 19 March 1908.

Taylor married Dorothea (a.k.a. Dorothy) Helen "Dossie" Reid (1910–1965), later Mrs. Maximillian Mackrill, on 11 June 1929. They had two children together. They separated in 1936, and divorced in 1940.

He married Veronica Therese Kavanagh (1920–1984) in 1941.

== Sprinting ==
Taylor was a sprinter who competed in professional races in the early 1930s, including winning the Bruthen Gift in 1933.

== Football ==
Taylor commenced his senior football career with Williamstown in 1932 and playing mostly in the centre he established himself as a key member of the side, being appointed as vice-captain in 1935.

In 1936 Taylor transferred to North Melbourne and played the first three rounds of the season but was then dropped to the reserves. In July he transferred back to Williamstown where he played until the end of the 1938 season.
