= Lindsay Meeking =

Australian rules footballer (1903–1960)

Personal information
- Full name: Samuel Michael Lindsay Meeking
- Born: 12 January 1903; Geelong, Victoria
- Died: 16 May 1960 (aged 57); Balwyn, Victoria

Playing career^{1}
Years	Club	Games (Goals)
1923–24	North Melbourne (VFA)	22 (5)
1925	North Melbourne	1 (1)
- ^{1} Playing statistics correct to the end of 1925.

Samuel Michael Lindsay Meeking (12 January 1903 – 16 May 1960) was an Australian rules footballer who played with North Melbourne in the Victorian Football League (VFL).

== Death ==
He died (suddenly) at his residence in Balwyn, Victoria on 16 May 1960.
