= Syd Jackson (footballer, born 1917) =

Australian rules footballer, born 1917

Personal information
- Full name: Syd Jackson
- Born: 14 May 1917
- Died: 9 December 2000 (aged 83)
- Height: 179 cm (5 ft 10 in)
- Weight: 81 kg (179 lb)

Playing career^{1}
| Years | Club | Games (Goals) |
| 1941–42 | North Melbourne | 4 (0) |
- ^{1} Playing statistics correct to the end of 1942.

Syd Jackson (14 May 1917 – 9 December 2000) was an Australian rules footballer who played with North Melbourne in the Victorian Football League (VFL).
