= Ron Walsh =

Australian rules footballer (born 1932)

Personal information
- Full name: Ronald George Walsh
- Born: 12 September 1932
- Died: 1 March 2003 (aged 70)
- Original team: Happy Valley
- Height: 180 cm (5 ft 11 in)
- Weight: 85 kg (187 lb)

Playing career^{1}
Years	Club	Games (Goals)
1953, 1955, 1957	North Melbourne	14 (1)
- ^{1} Playing statistics correct to the end of 1957.

Ronald George Walsh (12 September 1932 – 1 March 2003) was an Australian rules footballer who played with North Melbourne in the Victorian Football League (VFL).
