= Jack Moran (Australian footballer) =

Australian rules footballer, born 1919

Personal information
- Full name: John Thomas Moran
- Born: 23 March 1919; West Melbourne, Victoria
- Died: 27 May 1979 (aged 60); Brunswick, Victoria
- Original team: West Melbourne
- Height: 180 cm (5 ft 11 in)
- Weight: 73 kg (161 lb)

Playing career^{1}
Years	Club	Games (Goals)
1943–45	North Melbourne	30 (1)
1947	Port Melbourne (VFA)	2 (0)
- ^{1} Playing statistics correct to the end of 1947.

John Thomas Moran (23 March 1919 – 27 May 1979) was an Australian rules footballer who played with North Melbourne in the Victorian Football League (VFL).
