= Col Spratling =

Australian rules footballer, born 1918

Personal information
- Full name: Colin Bruce Spratling
- Born: 23 April 1918; Preston, Victoria
- Died: 9 May 2006 (aged 88)
- Height: 174 cm (5 ft 9 in)
- Weight: 67 kg (148 lb)

Playing career^{1}
Years	Club	Games (Goals)
1940–41, 1943	North Melbourne	18 (7)
- ^{1} Playing statistics correct to the end of 1943.

Colin Bruce Spratling (23 April 1918 – 9 May 2006) was an Australian rules footballer who played with North Melbourne in the Victorian Football League (VFL).
