= 1998 Ansett Australia Cup =

- Season: 1998
- Teams: 16
- Winners: North Melbourne (2nd title)
- Matches played: 15
- Michael Tuck Medallist: Wayne Carey, (North Melbourne)

The 1998 AFL Ansett Australia Cup was the Australian Football League competition played in its entirety before the Australian Football League's 1998 Premiership Season began. It culminated the Final in March 1998. The AFL National Cup is also sometimes referred to as the pre-season cup because it is played in its entirety before the Premiership Season begins.

== Games ==
=== Round of 16 ===
| Home team | Home team score | Away team | Away team score | Ground | Crowd | Date | Local Time | AEDT Time |
|---|---|---|---|---|---|---|---|---|
| Carlton | 11.8 (74) | North Melbourne | 17.17 (119) | North Hobart Oval | 9,563 | Saturday 21 February 1998 | 2:00 PM | 2:00 PM |
| Brisbane | 18.17 (125) | Fremantle | 16.7 (103) | Newlands Cricket Ground, Cape Town, South Africa | 10,123 | Sunday, 22 February 1998 | 2:00 PM | 11:00 PM |
| Adelaide | 17.10 (112) | Richmond | 15.18 (108) | Football Park | 17,923 | Monday, 23 February 1998 | 8:00 PM | 8:30 PM |
| West Coast | 13.12 (90) | Collingwood | 5.6 (36) | Subiaco | 17,535 | Wednesday, 25 February 1998 | 5:00 PM | 8:00 PM |
| Port Adelaide | 14.15 (99) | St. Kilda | 18.11 (119) | Football Park | 17,024 | Friday 27 February 1998 | 8:00 PM | 8:30 PM |
| Hawthorn | 7.10 (52) | Essendon | 19.11 (125) | Waverley Park | 34,536 | Saturday, 28 February 1998 | 8:00 PM | 8:00 PM |
| Sydney | 14.9 (93) | Melbourne | 15.15 (105) | Basin Reserve, Wellington, New Zealand | 7,820 | Sunday, 1 March 1998 | 2:00 PM | 12:00 PM |
| Geelong | 12.9 (81) | Western Bulldogs | 22.12 (144) | Waverley Park | 10,509 | Monday, 2 March 1998 | 8:00 PM | 8:00 PM |

=== Quarter Finals ===
| Home team | Home team score | Away team | Away team score | Ground | Crowd | Date | Local Time | AEDT Time |
|---|---|---|---|---|---|---|---|---|
| Brisbane | 18.17 (125) | Adelaide | 10.10 (70) | Gabba | 11,871 | Friday, 6 March 1998 | 7:00 PM | 8:00 PM |
| North Melbourne | 16.14 (110) | Essendon | 8.15 (63) | M.C.G. | 30,850 | Saturday, 7 March 1998 | 8:00 PM | 8:00 PM |
| West Coast | 10.4 (64) | St. Kilda | 24.18 (162) | Waverley Park | 15,817 | Sunday, 8 March 1998 | 8:00 PM | 8:00 PM |
| Melbourne | 13.10 (88) | Western Bulldogs | 9.10 (64) | Waverley Park | 13,537 | Monday, 9 March 1998 | 8:00 PM | 8:00 PM |

=== Semi Finals ===
| Home team | Home team score | Away team | Away team score | Ground | Crowd | Date | Local Time | AEDT Time |
|---|---|---|---|---|---|---|---|---|
| Brisbane | 8.7 (55) | North Melbourne | 14.16 (100) | Waverley Park | 10,015 | Friday 13 March 1998 | 8:00 PM | 8:00 PM |
| St. Kilda | 15.12 (102) | Melbourne | 9.11 (65) | Waverley Park | 28,054 | Saturday, 14 March 1998 | 8:00 PM | 8:00 PM |

=== Final ===
| Home team | Home team score | Away team | Away team score | Ground | Crowd | Date | Local Time | AEDT Time |
|---|---|---|---|---|---|---|---|---|
| North Melbourne | 14.13 (97) | St. Kilda | 12.11 (83) | Waverley Park | 63,898 | Saturday 21 March 1998 | 8:05 PM | 8:05 PM |

== Teams ==
North Melbourne
| B: | 13 Martin Pike | 4 Mick Martyn | 11 Glenn Archer |
| HB: | 12 John Blakey | 5 Jason McCartney | 34 David King |
| C: | 6 Shannon Grant | 10 Anthony Stevens | 28 Byron Pickett |
| HF: | 17 Glenn Freeborn | 18 Wayne Carey (Capt) | 24 Craig Sholl |
| F: | 26 Peter Bell | 35 John Longmire | 15 Winston Abraham |
| Foll: | 16 Matthew Capuano | 8 Robert Scott | 3 Anthony Rock |
| Int: | Damian Houlihan | 14 Brady Anderson | 23 Chris Groom |
| Int: | 37 Adam Simpson | 20 Anthony Mellington | 38 Danny Stevens |
| Coach: | Denis Pagan | | |

St. Kilda
| B: | 1 Justin Peckett | 13 David Sierakowski | 8 Max Hudghton |
| HB: | 7 Nicky Winmar | 15 Darryl Wakelin | 18 Jason Cripps |
| C: | 29 Andrew Thompson | 35 Robert Harvey | 5 Austinn Jones |
| HF: | 2 Tony Brown | 23 Stewart Loewe (Co-Capt) | 22 Matthew Lappin |
| F: | 27 Luke Beveridge | 25 Barry Hall | 12 Shane Wakelin |
| Foll: | 10 Peter Everitt | 19 Steven Sziller | 3 Nathan Burke (Co-Capt) |
| Int: | 11 Gavin Mitchell | 17 Rod Keogh | 20 Matthew Young |
| Int: | 42 Brett Cook | 26 Joe McLaren | 21 Ben Thompson |
| Coach: | Stan Alves | | |

== Knock-Out Chart ==
Round Of 16
Carlton | 74
North Melbourne | 119
Brisbane | 125
Fremantle | 103
Adelaide | 112
Richmond | 108
West Coast | 90
Collingwood | 36
Port Adelaide | 99
St. Kilda | 119
Hawthorn | 52
Essendon | 125
Sydney | 93
Melbourne | 105
Geelong | 81
Western Bulldogs | 144

Quarterfinals
Brisbane | 125
Adelaide | 70
North Melbourne | 110
Essendon | 63
West Coast | 64
St. Kilda | 162
Melbourne | 88
Western Bulldogs | 64

Semifinals
Brisbane | 55
North Melbourne | 100
St. Kilda | 102
Melbourne | 65

Final
North Melbourne | 14 | 13 | 97
St. Kilda | 12 | 11 | 83

== Scorecard ==
North Melbourne vs St Kilda
| Team | Q1 | Q2 | Q3 | Final |
|---|---|---|---|---|
| North Melbourne | 4.2 (26) | 6.6 (42) | 9.7 (61) | 14.13 (97) |
| St Kilda | 3.4 (22) | 9.8 (62) | 11.11 (77) | 12.11 (83) |
| Venue: | | Waverley Park, Melbourne | | |
| Date: | | Saturday, 21 March 1998 | | |
| Attendance: | | 63,898 | | |
| Umpires: | | | | |
| Goal scorers: | North Melbourne | Carey 5, Abraham 3, Blakey, Grant 2, Scott, Sholl | | |
| Goal scorers: | St. Kilda | Loewe 3, Everitt, Sierakowski 2, Jones, Winmar, Keogh, Sziller, Hall | | |
| Best: | North Melbourne | Carey, Abraham, Pike, Archer, A.Stevens, Grant | | |
| Best: | St. Kilda | Jones, Loewe, Sziller, Lappin, Winmar | | |
| Reports: | | | | |
| Injuries: | | Nill | | |
| Coin toss winner: | | | | |
| Michael Tuck Medal: | | Wayne Carey, North Melbourne | | |
| Australian television broadcaster: | | Seven Network, commentators: Sandy Roberts & Ian Robertson | | |
| National Anthem: | | | | |

== Final Placings ==
1. North Melbourne
2. St. Kilda
3. Melbourne
4. Brisbane
5. Western Bulldogs
6. Essendon
7. Adelaide
8. West Coast
9. Richmond
10. Sydney
11. Port Adelaide
12. Fremantle
13. Carlton
14. Geelong
15. Hawthorn
16. Collingwood

== See also ==
- List of Australian Football League night premiers
- 1998 AFL season
