= 1999 AFL Grand Final =

Grand final of the 1999 Australian Football League season

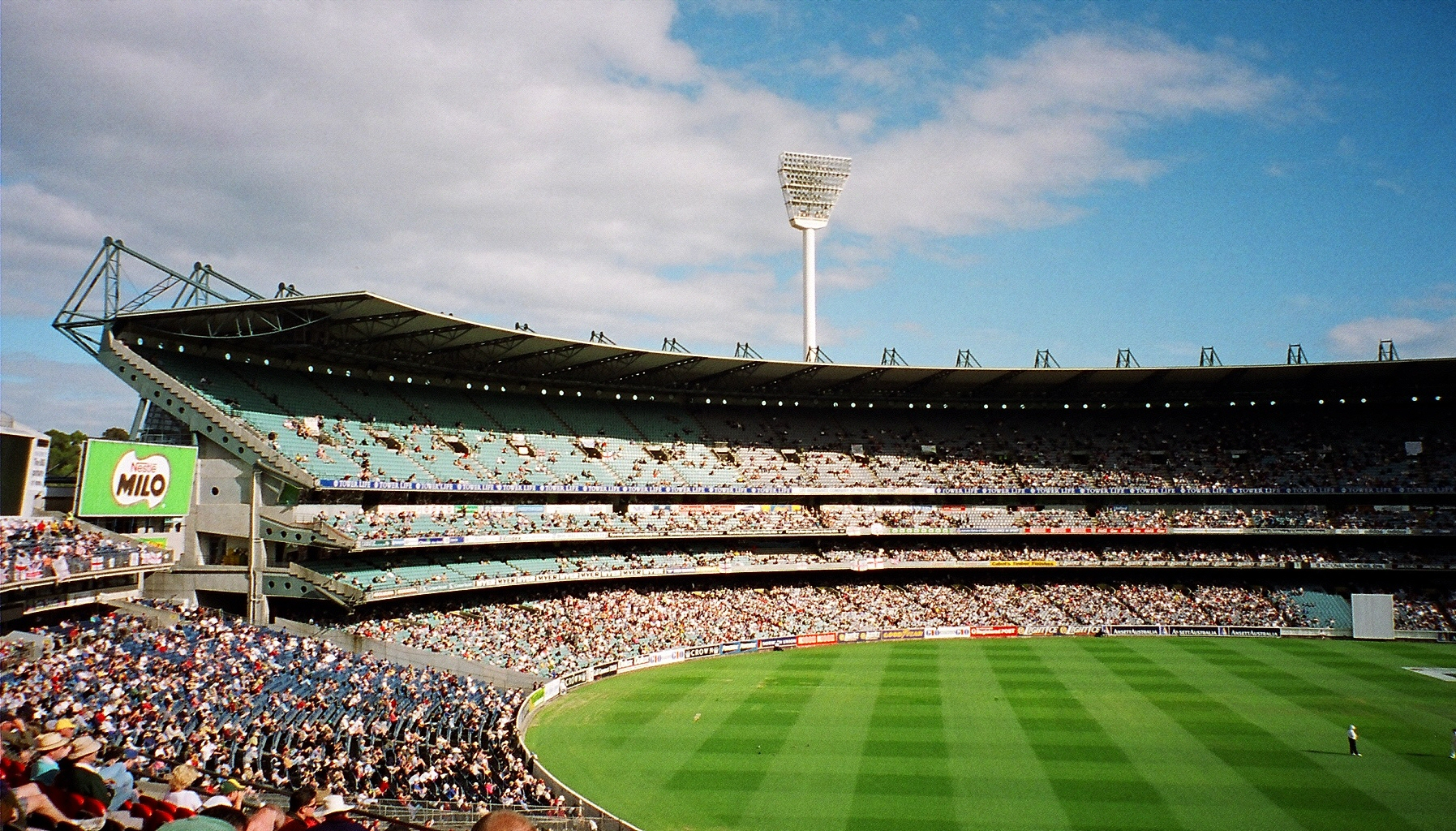
- The Melbourne Cricket Ground, where the 1999 AFL Grand Final took place.

Kangaroos	Carlton
19.10 (124)	12.17 (89)
	1	2	3	4
KAN	3.3 (21)	9.4 (58)	15.6 (96)	19.10 (124)
CAR	1.3 (9)	5.8 (38)	7.11 (53)	12.17 (89)
- Date: 25 September 1999
- Stadium: Melbourne Cricket Ground
- Attendance: 94,228
- Favourite: Kangaroos
- Umpires: Scott McLaren, Andrew Coates, Brett Allen
- Coin toss won by: Kangaroos
- Kicked toward: Punt Road End

Ceremonies
- Pre-match entertainment: Human Nature
- National anthem: Human Nature

Accolades
- Norm Smith Medallist: Shannon Grant (Kangaroos)
- Jock McHale Medallist: Denis Pagan

Broadcast in Australia
- Network: Seven Network
- Commentators: Bruce McAvaney (host and commentator); Sandy Roberts (commentator); Ian Robertson (commentator); Jason Dunstall (expert commentator); Gerard Healy (expert commentator); Robert DiPierdomenico (boundary rider); Richard Osborne (boundary rider)

The 1999 AFL Grand Final was an Australian rules football game contested between the Kangaroos Football Club and the Carlton Football Club in the annual grand final of the Australian Football League (formerly the Victorian Football League), staged to determine the premiers for the 1999 AFL season. The match, attended by 94,228 spectators, was won by the Kangaroos by a margin of 35 points (the second consecutive year in which the premiership decider was determined by that margin). It was the club's fourth and (as of 2026) most recent premiership victory.

== Background ==
This was the Kangaroos' second consecutive appearance in a grand final, with Carlton back again having won the 1995 AFL Grand Final.

It was not a grand final matchup that was widely anticipated prior to the finals, with the top placed Essendon Bombers clearly the standout team of the home & away season and heavily backed to reach the grand final against another top four aspirant. While the second placed Kangaroos qualified for the grand final with a preliminary final victory over the Brisbane Lions, the sixth placed Carlton Blues upset the Bombers to qualify as their grand final opponents in one of the biggest boilovers in finals history.

The Kangaroos finished the 1999 home-and-away season in second position with 17 wins and 5 losses, and although they had still conceded the most points against out of the top-10 teams on the ladder, this was largely due to the first 4 games of the season where key players were injured. They finished first in offense with 2463 points kicked. They were a game behind Essendon, with the Brisbane Lions, Western Bulldogs, West Coast, Carlton, Port Adelaide and Sydney making up the final eight. Carlton had finished with a record of 12 wins and ten losses, becoming only the third club (after Melbourne in 1900) and South Melbourne in 1899 to reach the grand final after finishing sixth on the ladder.

The Kangaroos progressed to the grand final after a 45-point win over Brisbane in the preliminary final. Carlton's unexpected preliminary final win against Essendon meant that the Kangaroos went into the grand final as heavy favourites.

== Teams ==
Kangaroos	Carlton

Kangaroos
B:	28 Byron Pickett	12 John Blakey	4 Mick Martyn
HB:	15 Winston Abraham	11 Glenn Archer	13 Martin Pike
C:	7 Adam Simpson	26 Peter Bell	6 Shannon Grant
HF:	33 Brett Allison	18 Wayne Carey (c)	29 Brent Harvey
F:	24 Craig Sholl	31 Corey McKernan	19 Cameron Mooney
Foll:	16 Matthew Capuano	34 David King	10 Anthony Stevens
Int:	44 Shannon Motlop	23 Shane Clayton	35 John Longmire
Int:	30 Scott Welsh		
Coach:	Denis Pagan		

Carlton
B:	14 Michael Sexton	43 Anthony Koutoufides	39 Ang Christou
HB:	21 Craig Bradley (c)	1 Stephen Silvagni	23 Dean Rice
C:	15 Ben Nelson	7 Brett Ratten	18 Justin Murphy
HF:	29 Simon Beaumont	8 Lance Whitnall	5 Andrew McKay
F:	36 Aaron Hamill	22 Glenn Manton	12 Matthew Lappin
Foll:	24 Matthew Allan	20 Fraser Brown	16 Scott Camporeale
Int:	3 Kris Massie	9 Adrian Hickmott	33 Matthew Hogg
Int:	45 Anthony Franchina		
Coach:	David Parkin		

== Match summary ==
Despite the Kangaroos entering the match as the strong short-priced favourite, Carlton seemed the better team in the opening 10 minutes and scored the first goal of the match when Brett Ratten seized an opportunity at the six minute mark after an errant kickout from the Kangaroos David King. This, however, was all they had to show for their efforts, as Glenn Archer, Byron Pickett and Mick Martyn stood up to nearly everything Carlton threw at them inside North's defensive zone. The Kangaroos, who were without suspended defender Jason McCartney, then kicked three goals in six minutes to go into the first break with a 12-point lead.

Carlton fought back in the second quarter to regain the lead by 8 points with goals to Fraser Brown, Scott Camporeale and Matthew Lappin, and it looked like the Blues had the momentum until the Kangaroos ruckman Corey McKernan booted two inspirational goals, the first from 65 metres out and the second from a tight angle just a minute later. The Kangaroos had regained control, but the Blues were still well in the game with the half time margin only 20 points.

The Kangaroos extended their lead in the third quarter when Winston Abraham kicked an easy goal before Carlton midfielder Justin Murphy injured his knee. The Blues managed to reduce the deficit to 13 points before the Kangaroos then added goals through McKernan and Shannon Motlop. Matthew Lappin turned the ball over running towards goal, which resulted in a Peter Bell goal to the Kangaroos and an eventual 43 point lead at three quarter time.

The last quarter was a rather pedestrian affair. Early goals to Bell and Motlop cemented the Kangaroos victory, before Carlton were allowed some late goals to somewhat reduce the margin. In the end, despite both teams having 29 scoring shots, the Kangaroos ran out 35 point winners. Carlton's best was probably Stephen Silvagni, who kept Wayne Carey to just 2 goals. But winners on the day were hard to find for Carlton, who in the eyes of many had already played their 'grand final' the week before, and as such performed admirably. Kangaroo's Shannon Grant won the Norm Smith Medal for best on ground with 19 possessions and 4 goals. Grant had come under heavy criticism for his performance in the previous grand final, which the Kangaroos had lost. After missing out on a wonderful opportunity against Adelaide in 1998, the Kangaroos had redeemed themselves by taking the 1999 flag.

== Scorecard ==
1999 AFL Grand Final
Saturday, 25 September 1999 3:00 pm AEST	Kangaroos	def.	Carlton	Melbourne Cricket Ground (crowd: 94,228)
3.3 (21); 9.4 (58); 15.6 (96); 19.10 (124)	Q1; Q2; Q3; Final	1.3 (9); 5.8 (38); 7.11 (53); 12.17 (89)	Umpires: McLaren, Coates, Allen; Norm Smith Medal: Shannon Grant; Television broadcast: Seven Network; National anthem: Human Nature
Bell 4, Grant 4, McKernan 3, Abraham 2, Carey 2, Motlop 2, Sholl, Welsh	Goals	Camporeale 2, Lappin 2, Whitnall 2, Allan, Beaumont, Brown, Hamill, Ratten, Rice
Grant, Pickett, Martyn, Archer, Bell, Capuano, Simpson	Best	McKay, Camporeale, Lappin, Rice, Ratten, Sexton
Nil	Injuries	Murphy (knee)
Nil	Reports	Nil
Kangaroos won the toss and elected to kick to the Punt Road end

== Epilogue ==
As of the 2025 season this remains the last time either Carlton or the Kangaroos have appeared in a grand final. After Richmond met Adelaide in 2017, these became the longest grand final droughts for any AFL club. They would both proceed to the preliminary finals in 2000, but lost to Essendon and Melbourne respectively.

The Kangaroos would struggle with consistency (not helped by the abrupt 2002 departure of captain Wayne Carey), playing finals in 2002, 2005, 2007 and 2008 within the next decade.

After reaching the semi-final in 2001, Carlton would swiftly fall to the bottom of the ladder in 2002, claiming their first wooden spoon in their history, and the last of all the Victorian teams to do so. They would be found guilty of breaching their salary cap, which saw them stripped them of early draft picks for two years, hindering their short-term rebuild, fined $930,000 and club president John Elliott removed from his position. They would not make finals again until 2009.

For the season's minor premiers, Essendon, it was a bitter pill to swallow that they were unable to compete in this grand final. Coach Kevin Sheedy forced the Essendon playing group to attend the match as spectators to ponder “what might have been”. They would go on to have their own success just a year later in the 2000 AFL Grand Final.

While Carlton's unexpected feat of reaching the grand final in 1999 has undoubtedly gone into Australian Football folklore, the finals system at the time was widely criticised for allowing a team that had finished as low as 6th to reach the grand final after losing its first finals match (a similar instance also occurred the year prior, with the 5th placed Adelaide Crows advancing on to ultimately win the 1998 premiership despite losing in the first week of the finals). Carlton were beaten by the Brisbane Lions in the qualifying final, yet still progressed to the second week of the finals to play the West Coast Eagles. This match, which was won by Carlton, also created a lot of controversy as the Eagles, who subsequently finished a place higher than Carlton and won its first finals match, had earned the right to host the final in Perth, yet were forced to play the match at the MCG due to a contractual agreement with the AFL that required at least one match to be played at that venue every week of the finals.

The AFL acted quickly, and in the 2000 season the finals system was changed, requiring the need for teams that finished between 5th-8th after the home & away season needing to win all their finals matches to reach the grand final (a loss in any week would see them eliminated).

The MCG finals contract was also renegotiated, with only the grand final to be committed to the MCG, freeing up higher ranked teams to be able to host finals matches in their home state should they be entitled to. This came after 2004, when the Brisbane Lions were forced to play preliminary final at the MCG, instead of at their home venue before losing the grand final to the Port Adelaide Football Club.

That finals system was in place until the end of the 2025 AFL season, with only three teams reaching the grand final from below fourth position since 2000. The Western Bulldogs in 2016 made the grand final after finishing seventh on the ladder, yet did so without losing any finals and ultimately went on to win the premiership. Greater Western Sydney qualified for the 2019 grand final after finishing in sixth position. The Western Bulldogs qualified in 2021 after finishing in fifth position. Their second time doing this and first time without a pre-finals bye. The Brisbane Lions qualified in 2024 after finishing fifth position. They ended up winning in the grand final against the minor premiers.

== See also ==
- 1999 AFL season
