= David King (footballer, born 1972) =

Australian rules footballer

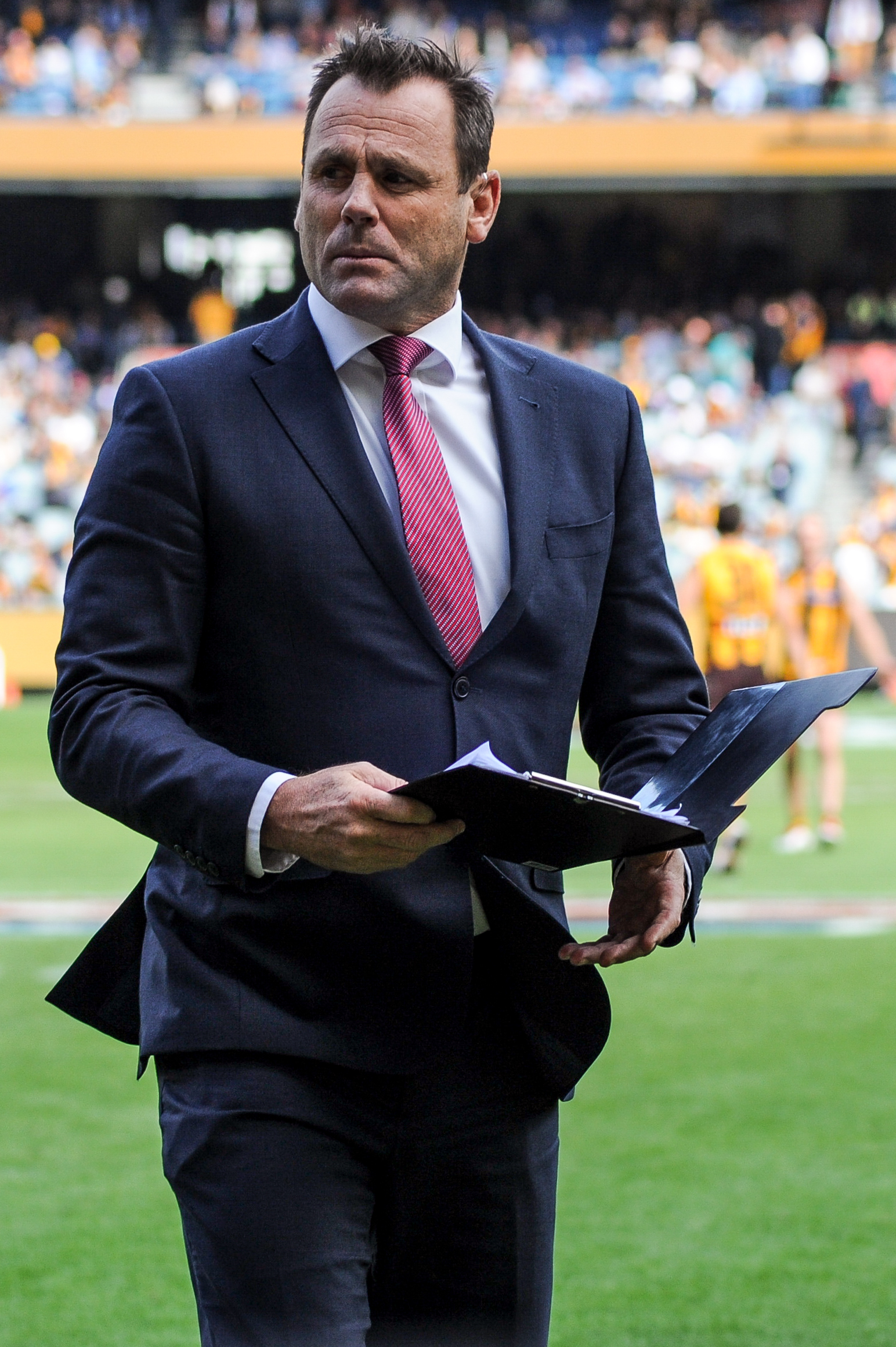
- King with Fox Footy in April 2017

Personal information
- Full name: David King
- Nickname: Kingy
- Born: 7 March 1972 (age 54)
- Original team: Port Melbourne/Assumption College
- Draft: 46th overall, 1993 AFL draft
- Height: 183 cm (6 ft 0 in)
- Weight: 94 kg (207 lb)
- Position: Midfielder/Defender

Playing career^{1}
Years	Club	Games (Goals)
1994–2004	North Melbourne	241 (145)

Representative team honours^{2}
Years	Team	Games (Goals)
1997–1999	Victoria	? (?)

International team honours^{2}
2000–2001	Australia	? (?)
- ^{1} Playing statistics correct to the end of 2004.^{2} Representative statistics correct as of 2001.

Career highlights
- 2× AFL premiership player: 1996, 1999; 2× All-Australian Team: (1997, 1998)

David King (born 7 March 1972) is a former Australian rules footballer who played for the North Melbourne Football Club in the Australian Football League (AFL). After his playing career, he became a radio and television football commentator.

== Football career ==
He debuted for the Kangaroos in 1994 after being recruited from Port Melbourne Football Club at the age of 22. He went on to play 241 games and kicked 145 goals, winning premierships in 1996 and 1999.

He represented Victoria in State of Origin on more than one occasion, including in 1998. He is notable for holding a VFL/AFL record by playing in preliminary finals for seven consecutive years (along with teammates John Blakey, Wayne Carey, Mick Martyn, Corey McKernan & Craig Sholl) from his debut year in 1994 to 2000.

He was twice an AFL All-Australian and retired at the end of the 2004 season. He then joined the Richmond Football Club as an assistant coach in 2005.

== Post-playing career ==
He is currently a commentator for Fox Footy and SEN 1116. King was awarded the Most Outstanding Television Special Comments award at the 2012 AFL Media Awards. He also is a panellist on the Fox Footy show First Crack.

== Legal issues ==
On 19 February 2015, Australian media reported that King was being investigated by police about successful bets he made predicting the winner of the 2014 AFL Rising Star award.

On 14 January 2019, King was fined for fleeing the scene of a car crash and drink driving in Melbourne in October 2018. King was driving his grey Nissan X-Trail at 12.10am on 3 October when he crashed into a stationary taxi at Southbank. Police later arrested King nearby at Crown Casino, after which he blew a blood alcohol reading of 0.10—twice the legal limit—fined $1200, had his licence suspended for 10 months, and had an interlock device fitted to his car.

== Statistics ==
Legend
G	Goals	K	Kicks	D	Disposals	T	Tackles
B	Behinds	H	Handballs	M	Marks
#	Played in that season's premiership team

Season	Team	No.	Games	Totals							Averages (per game)						
Season	Team	No.	Games	G	B	K	H	D	M	T	G	B	K	H	D	M	T
1994	North Melbourne	34	19	4	11	154	66	220	21	21	0.2	0.6	8.1	3.5	11.6	1.1	1.1
1995	North Melbourne	34	22	8	5	228	90	318	42	21	0.4	0.2	10.4	4.1	14.5	1.9	1.0
1996^{#}	North Melbourne	34	25	5	2	280	115	395	79	31	0.2	0.1	11.2	4.6	15.8	3.2	1.2
1997	North Melbourne	34	23	8	5	348	73	421	67	23	0.3	0.2	15.1	3.2	18.3	2.9	1.0
1998	North Melbourne	34	22	10	12	322	86	408	54	28	0.5	0.5	14.6	3.9	18.5	2.5	1.3
1999^{#}	North Melbourne	34	21	8	8	286	74	360	64	21	0.4	0.4	13.6	3.5	17.1	3.0	1.0
2000	North Melbourne	34	25	27	11	399	105	504	92	50	1.1	0.4	16.0	4.2	20.2	3.7	2.0
2001	North Melbourne	34	19	19	11	291	99	390	64	28	1.0	0.6	15.3	5.2	20.5	3.4	1.5
2002	North Melbourne	34	22	22	23	308	87	395	70	34	1.0	1.0	14.0	4.0	18.0	3.2	1.5
2003	North Melbourne	34	21	26	27	286	51	337	99	44	1.2	1.3	13.6	2.4	16.0	4.7	2.1
2004	North Melbourne	34	22	8	9	271	65	336	94	37	0.4	0.4	12.3	3.0	15.3	4.3	1.7
Career			241	145	124	3173	911	4084	746	338	0.6	0.5	13.2	3.8	16.9	3.1	1.4
