= 1996 AFL Grand Final =

Grand final of the 1996 Australian Football League season

North Melbourne	Sydney
19.17 (131)	13.10 (88)
	1	2	3	4
NM	3.2 (20)	8.7 (55)	12.14 (86)	19.17 (131)
SYD	6.2 (38)	8.5 (53)	9.7 (61)	13.10 (88)
- Date: 28 September 1996
- Stadium: Melbourne Cricket Ground
- Attendance: 93,102
- Favourite: North Melbourne
- Umpires: Gavin Dore (156), Mark Nash (63), Bryan Sheehan (223)

Ceremonies
- Pre-match entertainment: A collection of past singers

Accolades
- Norm Smith Medallist: Glenn Archer (North Melbourne)

Broadcast in Australia
- Network: Seven Network
- Commentators: Bruce McAvaney (host and commentator); Sandy Roberts (commentator); Leigh Matthews (expert commentator); Robert DiPierdomenico (boundary rider); Neil Kerley (boundary rider)

The 1996 AFL Grand Final was an Australian rules football game contested between the North Melbourne Football Club and the Sydney Swans, held at the Melbourne Cricket Ground in Melbourne on 28 September 1996. It was the 100th annual grand final of the Australian Football League (formerly the Victorian Football League), staged to determine the premiers for the 1996 AFL season. The match, attended by 93,102 people, was won by North Melbourne by 43 points.

== Background ==
Sydney were playing in a grand final for the first time since relocating from South Melbourne. It was the Swans' first appearance in a premiership decider since losing the 1945 VFL Grand Final, while it was North Melbourne's first since losing the 1978 VFL Grand Final.

At the conclusion of the home-and-away season, Sydney had finished first on the AFL ladder with 16 wins and 5 losses and one draw, winning the McClelland Trophy (aka the minor premiership). North Melbourne had finished second with 16 wins and 6 losses.

The lead-up to the game was dominated by the tribunal case of Sydney defender Andrew Dunkley, who was to be the Swans' match-up for star Kangaroos forward Wayne Carey. On the Wednesday before the grand final, Dunkley was reported on video evidence – which was still relatively uncommon practice at the time – for striking Essendon's James Hird in the previous week's preliminary final. On the Thursday before the game, Sydney successfully obtained a Supreme Court injunction to prevent the case from being heard until after the grand final, with the judge ruling that requiring Dunkley to face the tribunal only one day after learning of the charge and two days before the grand final would deny him natural justice and deny him the time required to prepare a defence. Consequently, Dunkley was free to play. When Dunkley ultimately faced the tribunal, he was suspended for three weeks.

== Match summary ==
The AFL's centenary year was crowned by North Melbourne, who made amends for the disappointment of three successive failed finals campaigns. The Kangaroos won their third flag despite a slow start. Led by bullocking defender Glenn Archer and superstars Corey McKernan and Wayne Carey, the Kangaroos were hellbent in their premiership quest.

The Swans started well to lead by 18 points at quarter-time. When Jason Mooney scored early in the second quarter, the Swans' lead extended to 24 points. However, Glenn Freeborn's move to the forward line sparked the Kangaroos, with Freeborn kicking three goals for the quarter and Darren Crocker and Brett Allison each kicking one, and by half time the Kangaroos led by two points.

North Melbourne dominated the third quarter, with two goals to Craig Sholl and one each to Peter Bell and Crocker, which saw them leading by 25 points at three-quarter-time.

The Kangaroos kicked the first two goals of the final quarter through Anthony Stevens and Mark Roberts to effectively kill the contest. The two teams traded goals until the end of the game, with North ultimately triumphing by 43 points.

Tony Lockett tried hard for the Swans in his first and only grand final, booting six goals. Paul Roos was playing in his 314th game of VFL/AFL football. He continues to hold the record for the most games played before participating in his first grand final.

The Norm Smith Medal was awarded to Archer for being judged the best player afield.

== Teams ==
North Melbourne	Sydney

North Melbourne
B:	8 Robert Scott	4 Mick Martyn	11 Glenn Archer
HB:	2 Wayne Schwass	6 Ian Fairley	12 John Blakey
C:	34 David King	37 Adam Simpson	7 Dean Laidley
HF:	17 Glenn Freeborn	18 Wayne Carey (c)	33 Brett Allison
F:	24 Craig Sholl	31 Corey McKernan	27 Darren Crocker
Foll:	16 Matthew Capuano	3 Anthony Rock	10 Anthony Stevens
Int:	5 Stuart Anderson	22 Mark Roberts	26 Peter Bell
Coach:	Denis Pagan		

Sydney
B:	7 Brad Seymour	6 Andrew Dunkley	30 Mark Bayes
HB:	39 Adam Heuskes	1 Paul Roos	19 Michael O'Loughlin
C:	27 Wade Chapman	8 Daryn Cresswell	9 Shannon Grant
HF:	34 Troy Luff	17 Jason Mooney	3 Dale Lewis
F:	5 Craig O'Brien	4 Tony Lockett	11 Stuart Maxfield
Foll:	15 Greg Stafford	12 Kevin Dyson	14 Paul Kelly (c)
Int:	24 Derek Kickett	32 Daniel McPherson	29 Simon Garlick
Coach:	Rodney Eade		

== Scoreboard ==
1996 AFL Grand Final
Saturday, 28 September (2:45 pm)	North Melbourne	def.	Sydney	MCG (crowd: 93,102)	Report
3.2 (20); 8.7 (55); 12.14 (86); 19.17 (131)	Q1; Q2; Q3; Final	6.2 (38); 8.5 (53); 9.7 (61); 13.10 (88)	Umpires: Dore, Nash, Sheehan; Norm Smith Medal: Glenn Archer; Television broadcast: Seven Network
Crocker 3, Freeborn 3, Allison 2, Roberts 2, Sholl 2, Stevens 2, Bell, Carey, Fairley, Rock, Simpson	Goals	Lockett 6, Luff 2, O'Loughlin 2, Cresswell, Kickett, Mooney
Archer, Rock, McKernan, Stevens, Carey, Sholl, Schwass	Best	Roos, Heuskes, Lewis, Cresswell, Luff, Kelly
Nil	Injuries	Nil
Nil	Reports	Nil
