= Paul Kelly (Australian rules footballer) =

Australian rules footballer (born 1969)

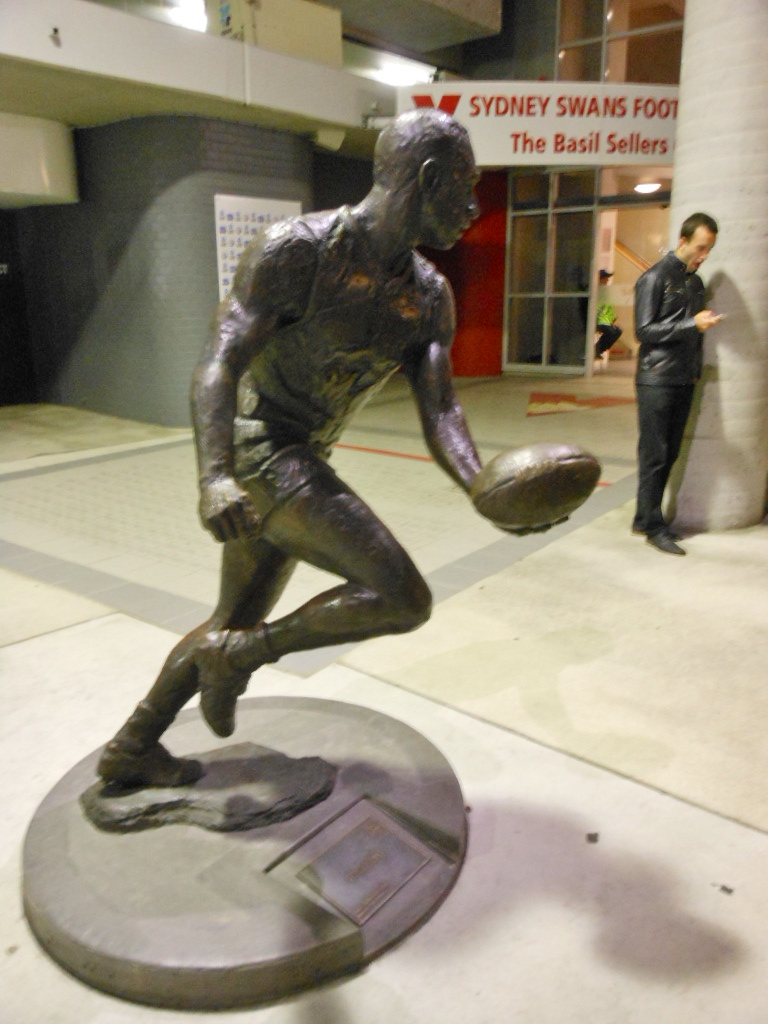
- Bronze statue of Kelly at the Sydney Cricket Ground

Personal information
- Born: 28 July 1969 (age 57); West Wyalong, New South Wales
- Original team: Wagga Tigers (RFL)
- Height: 179 cm (5 ft 10 in)
- Weight: 83 kg (183 lb)
- Position: Midfielder

Playing career^{1}
Years	Club	Games (Goals)
1990–2002	Sydney	234 (200)
- ^{1} Playing statistics correct to the end of 2002.

Career highlights
- Brownlow Medal: 1995; All-Australian team: 1995, 1996, 1997; Bob Skilton Medal 1992, 1993, 1996, 1997; Sydney captain: 1993-2002; Australian Football Hall of Fame (inducted 2007); Sydney Team of the Century (forward, vice-captain)

Paul Kelly (born 28 July 1969) is a former Australian rules footballer, winner of the Brownlow Medal and captain of the Sydney Swans for ten seasons. He was and still is known to Swans fans everywhere as "Captain Courageous".

Born and raised in Wagga Wagga, New South Wales, Kelly attended St Michael's School and initially played rugby league for Wagga Brothers but turned to Australian rules football at age 15.

Recruited to the AFL by the Swans, Kelly made his debut in 1990 after being the best player in his school; was appointed captain in 1993 at just 23 years of age; won the Brownlow Medal (the AFL's highest individual honour) in 1995; won club best and fairests in 1992, 1993, 1996 and 1997; received All-Australian selection in 1995, 1996 and 1997 (the last two as captain); and earned the AFL Players Association's Robert Rose Award for Most Courageous Player in 1994, 1995, 1996, 1997 and 2000 (second only to Glenn Archer).

Kelly led the Swans to the AFL Grand Final in 1996—its first since 1945—and was considered one of the best players in the competition during the mid-1990s, but from 1998 onwards he was severely hampered by injuries. Kelly retired after 234 AFL games and served as the Swans runner in 2003 before retiring to his farm near Wagga Wagga. His autobiography, Swan Song, was published in 2003 and covers the period until his retirement from football. His No. 14 jumper was retired for 5 years before it was brought out again, this time to be worn by Craig Bird. The current wearer of the no. 14 jumper at the Swans is co-captain Callum Mills.

In 2005, Kelly was on hand to present the premiership cup to Paul Roos and Barry Hall after the Swans' nail-biting 4-point Grand Final win.

In 2006, he presented the 2006 Brownlow Medal to former teammate Adam Goodes.

He was inducted into the Australian Football Hall of Fame in July 2007.

== Statistics ==
Legend
G	Goals	K	Kicks	D	Disposals	T	Tackles
B	Behinds	H	Handballs	M	Marks

Season	Team	No.	Games	Totals							Averages (per game)						
Season	Team	No.	Games	G	B	K	H	D	M	T	G	B	K	H	D	M	T
1990	Sydney	45	10	2	4	48	43	91	15	8	0.2	0.4	4.8	4.3	9.1	1.5	0.8
1991	Sydney	14	20	14	20	219	173	392	52	51	0.7	1.0	11.0	8.7	19.6	2.6	2.6
1992	Sydney	14	22	8	16	310	216	526	63	73	0.4	0.7	14.1	9.8	23.9	2.9	3.3
1993	Sydney	14	20	11	6	269	153	422	55	67	0.6	0.3	13.5	7.7	21.1	2.8	3.4
1994	Sydney	14	18	15	12	226	206	432	70	42	0.8	0.7	12.6	11.4	24.0	3.9	2.3
1995	Sydney	14	22	15	11	285	153	438	68	77	0.7	0.5	13.0	7.0	19.9	3.1	3.5
1996	Sydney	14	25	18	13	371	205	576	128	70	0.7	0.5	14.8	8.2	23.0	5.1	2.8
1997	Sydney	14	23	26	30	376	178	554	100	40	1.1	1.3	16.3	7.7	24.1	4.3	1.7
1998	Sydney	14	16	27	11	229	108	337	64	28	1.7	0.7	14.3	6.8	21.1	4.0	1.8
1999	Sydney	14	21	28	25	267	137	404	86	29	1.3	1.2	12.7	6.5	19.2	4.1	1.4
2000	Sydney	14	8	10	2	67	38	105	31	16	1.3	0.3	8.4	4.8	13.1	3.9	2.0
2001	Sydney	14	11	13	11	117	48	165	52	28	1.2	1.0	10.6	4.4	15.0	4.7	2.5
2002	Sydney	14	18	13	13	200	135	335	61	65	0.7	0.7	11.1	7.5	18.6	3.4	3.6
Career			234	200	174	2984	1793	4777	845	594	0.9	0.7	12.8	7.7	20.4	3.6	2.5

== Honours and achievements ==
**Brownlow Medal votes**
Season	Votes
1990	—
1991	—
1992	4
1993	11
1994	11
**1995**	**21**
1996	14
1997	21
1998	1
1999	7
2000	—
2001	3
2002	10
**Total**	**103**
Key:
Green / **Bold** = Won

- **199Team**
  - McClelland Trophy (Sydney): 1996
- **Individual**
  - Brownlow Medal: 1995
  - Bob Skilton Medal (Sydney Swans Best & Fairest): 1992, 1993, 1996, 1997
  - All-Australian: 1995, 1996, 1997
  - AFLPA Best Captain Award: 1999
  - AFLPA Robert Rose Most Courageous Player Award: 1994, 1995, 1996, 1997, 2000
  - Sydney Swans Captain: 1993–2002
  - **Sydney Swans Team of the Century – forward pocket (vice-captain)**
  - Australian Football Hall of Fame inductee: 2007
