= Blakey's Shoe Protectors =

British manufacturer of metal shoe and boot protectors

Blakey's Shoe Protectors (marketed as Blakey's Segs) are British made metal plates and studs fitted to the soles and heels of shoes and boots to slow wear and improve durability. The products were invented in 1880 by the engineer John Blakey and were produced for more than a century at the Armley Malleable Ironworks in Leeds before manufacture was transferred to Walsall under H. Goodwin (Castings) Ltd.

== History ==
John Blakey introduced the first commercial forms of metal heel and sole protectors in 1880 and established their manufacture at the Armley Malleable Ironworks in Leeds. The factory developed into a sizeable local industry, supported by extensive advertising and national distribution. Promotional material from the early twentieth century shows a wide range of product lines directed at workers, children and fashion footwear.

Blakey's produced shoe hardware in Leeds for more than one hundred years. In 2014 the business, along with its machinery, was acquired by H. Goodwin (Castings) Ltd. and moved to Walsall. Production continues there for domestic and international markets.

== Products ==
The term "seg" derives from the phrase "segment of steel". Blakey's products consist of metal plates, hobs and studs designed to take abrasion in place of the leather sole. The range is organised by size and shape. Standard seg sizes run from No. 1 to No. 9, with published dimensions from both manufacturer and retailers. Rubber variants appear in the range for applications where a non-metallic option is desirable.

Blakey's manufactures heel plates, toe plates, quarter tips and combined sets intended for work boots, parade boots and general footwear. Fitting involves positioning the plate on the sole and securing it with the supplied nails or screws.

Castings are produced in Walsall using sand moulds and controlled metalworking processes. The firm retains long established patterns and shapes that have remained in use since the nineteenth century.

== Uses ==
Blakey's protectors have long been used to prolong the life of footwear subjected to frequent wear. Workers in industrial occupations historically adopted segs to extend the lifespan of their boots. They also have a sustained role in military and parade footwear, supported by the availability of dedicated heel and toe plate sets for ammunition and drill boots.

Blakey's products also appear in fashion and subcultural contexts. Leeds Museums notes their association with youth styles and the characteristic metallic click created by metal plates on hard pavements.

== Manufacture and heritage ==
H. Goodwin (Castings) Ltd. produces the Blakey's range in Walsall, continuing a British manufacturing tradition that dates back to the nineteenth century. Foundry processes involve preparing sand moulds, pouring molten metal, fettling castings and carrying out inspection before packing.

The former Armley Malleable Ironworks retains architectural traces of the Blakey's enterprise, including ghost signage. Leeds Museums and Galleries preserves extensive archives of original packaging, artwork and catalogues that document the development of the brand and its role in everyday footwear maintenance.

== Collections ==
Blakey's products appear in museum collections of twentieth century footwear and shoe repair equipment. Jersey Heritage records examples of the firm's hardware in assorted shoe parts gathered for preservation.

== See also ==
- Heel tap
- Hobnail
- Shoe repair
- Sole (shoe)
