= 1997 Brownlow Medal =

- Winner: Robert Harvey (St Kilda); 26 votes

Television/radio coverage
- Network: Seven Network

The 1997 Brownlow Medal was the 70th year the award was presented to the player adjudged the fairest and best player during the Australian Football League (AFL) home-and-away season. Robert Harvey of the St Kilda Football Club won the medal by polling twenty-six votes during the 1997 AFL season. Despite polling more votes than Harvey, Chris Grant of the Western Bulldogs was ineligible due to suspension.

== Leading vote-getters ==
	Player	Votes
	Chris Grant (Western Bulldogs)*	27
1st	Robert Harvey (St Kilda)	26
=2nd	Peter Matera (West Coast)	21
=2nd	Paul Kelly (Sydney)	21
=4th	Nathan Burke (St Kilda)	18
=4th	Mark Ricciuto (Adelaide)	18
6th	Brad Sholl (Geelong)	16
=7th	Andrew Wills (Fremantle)	15
=7th	Craig Bradley (Carlton)	15
=9th	Paul Salmon (Hawthorn)	13
=9th	Nathan Buckley (Collingwood)	13
	Darren Jarman (Adelaide)*	13
	Dale Lewis (Sydney)*	13

* The player was ineligible to win the medal due to suspension by the AFL Tribunal during the year.
