= 1996 Brownlow Medal =

- Location: World Congress Centre
- Winners: Michael Voss (Brisbane Bears); James Hird (Essendon); 21 votes

Television/radio coverage
- Network: Seven Network

The 1996 Brownlow Medal was the 69th year the award was presented to the player adjudged the fairest and best player during the Australian Football League (AFL) home and away season.

Michael Voss of the Brisbane Bears and James Hird of the Essendon Football Club both won the medal by polling twenty-one votes during the 1996 AFL season.

Corey McKernan of the North Melbourne Football Club polled the same number of votes as Voss and Hird, but due to a tribunal suspension during the year, he was deemed ineligible to win the award. This caused some to call for the rules to be changed to allow suspended players to still be eligible. The eligibility rules have remained the same since then, relying on the fairest section of fairest and best to continue to exclude suspended players from being able to win the award. McKernan went on to be a member of North Melbourne's winning 1996 AFL Grand Final team, something that both Voss and Hird said that they would prefer over winning the medal.

In the lead-up to the count, the AFL requested that the previous year's winner, Paul Kelly, attend the count in person at the World Congress Centre in Melbourne rather than via video link from Sydney. This caused a betting plunge on Kelly.

== Leading vote-getters ==
Position	Player	Votes
=1st	Michael Voss (Brisbane Bears)	21
=1st	James Hird (Essendon)	21
	Corey McKernan (North Melbourne)*	21
=3rd	Chris Grant (Footscray)	20
=3rd	Nathan Burke (St Kilda)	20
5th	Garry Hocking (Geelong)	19
6th	Paul Salmon (Hawthorn)	18
=7th	Justin Charles (Richmond)	17
=7th	Stewart Loewe (St Kilda)	17
=7th	Guy McKenna (West Coast)	17
=7th	Robert Harvey (St Kilda)	17

* The player was ineligible to win the medal due to suspension by the AFL Tribunal during the year.
