= Johnny Get Angry (horse) =

New Zealand Thoroughbred racehorse

- Sire: Tavistock
- Grandsire: Montjeu
- Dam: Luminova
- Damsire: Zabeel
- Sex: Gelding
- Foaled: 9 Nov 2017
- Country: New Zealand
- Colour: Bay
- Breeder: Greenwich Stud (NZ)
- Owner: Denis Pagan
- Trainer: Denis Pagan
- Record: 9: 1–1–2
- Earnings: $1,268,675

Major wins
- Victoria Derby (2020)

Johnny Get Angry (foaled 9 November 2017) is a Group 1 winning New Zealand bred thoroughbred racehorse who is most notable for winning the 2020 Victoria Derby.

== Background ==
Johnny Get Angry was Denis Pagan's first race-horse.
