= Winston Abraham =

Australian rules footballer (born 1974)

Personal information
- Full name: Winston Errol Abraham
- Born: 29 September 1974 (age 52); Narrogin
- Original team: Perth (WAFL)
- Debut: Round 1, 1995, Fremantle vs. Richmond, at the MCG

Playing career^{1}
Years	Club	Games (Goals)
1995–1997	Fremantle	38 (55)
1998–2001	Kangaroos	72 (104)
Total		110 (159)
- ^{1} Playing statistics correct to the end of 2001.

Career highlights
- AFL premiership player: 1999; Mark of the Year 1998; Pre-season premiership 1998; State of origin Western Australia

Winston Errol Abraham (born 29 September 1974) is an Australian rules footballer. During his AFL career he played as a half forward.

== Early career ==
Abraham played in the Western Australian Sunday Football League for Thornlie and Kelmscott. He then played for Perth in the West Australian Football League, playing only 8 games before being recruited by the Fremantle Football Club

== AFL ==
He was a member of the Fremantle Dockers inaugural squad and played in the Round 1 match against the Richmond Tigers at the MCG. He was noted for his pace and ability to kick freak goals. In 1998, he moved to the Kangaroos, winning the Mark of the Year in his first season, and played in their 1999 Premiership side.

In the first home and away game of 2001, he suffered an injury that would ultimately end his career. In a freak incident, less than a minute after he entered the ground, he ran into a stationary James Hird (who had taken a mark more than a second earlier) and on falling landed awkwardly and damaged his left knee. After injuring the knee, he walked off the ground. He was delisted at the end of that season, after it became apparent that surgery to his knee had not been successful.

== Coaching ==
He was assistant coach at the Perth Football Club, his original club, in 2006.

In 2008, Abraham was coach of Western Australian Sunday Football League team Kelmscott.

== Playing statistics ==
Legend
G	Goals	K	Kicks	D	Disposals	T	Tackles
B	Behinds	H	Handballs	M	Marks

Season	Team	No.	Games	Totals							Averages (per game)						
Season	Team	No.	Games	G	B	K	H	D	M	T	G	B	K	H	D	M	T
1995	Fremantle	15	12	23	12	86	34	120	29	22	1.9	1.0	7.2	2.8	10.0	2.4	1.8
1996	Fremantle	15	13	16	19	125	33	158	44	35	1.2	1.5	9.6	2.5	12.2	3.4	2.7
1997	Fremantle	15	13	16	13	93	37	130	29	14	1.2	1.0	7.2	2.8	10.0	2.2	1.1
1998	North Melbourne	15	25	40	30	234	105	339	56	48	1.6	1.2	9.4	4.2	13.6	2.2	1.9
1999	Kangaroos	15	23	37	23	186	102	288	56	28	1.6	1.0	8.1	4.4	12.5	2.4	1.2
2000	Kangaroos	15	23	27	17	166	86	252	51	37	1.2	0.7	7.2	3.7	11.0	2.2	1.6
2001	Kangaroos	15	1	0	0	0	0	0	0	0	0.0	0.0	0.0	0.0	0.0	0.0	0.0
Career			110	159	114	890	397	1287	265	184	1.4	1.0	8.1	3.6	11.7	2.4	1.7
