= Brad Seymour =

Australian rules footballer

Personal information
- Born: 3 May 1976 (age 50); Wagga Wagga, New South Wales
- Original team: Wagga Tigers (Riverina Football League)
- Height: 186 cm (6 ft 1 in)
- Weight: 88 kg (194 lb)
- Position: Defender

Playing career^{1}
Years	Club	Games (Goals)
1994–2003	Sydney	133 (12)
- ^{1} Playing statistics correct to the end of 2003.

Brad Seymour (born 3 May 1976) is a former Australian rules footballer. A defender from Wagga Wagga, Seymour spent his entire ten-year career with the Sydney Swans and played in the 1996 AFL Grand Final.
