= Bryan Martyn =

Australian rules footballer

Personal information
- Full name: Charles Bryan Martyn
- Born: 27 December 1930
- Died: 9 June 2002 (aged 71)
- Original team: Kensington
- Height: 191 cm (6 ft 3 in)
- Weight: 90 kg (198 lb)

Playing career^{1}
| Years | Club | Games (Goals) |
| 1950–1958 | North Melbourne | 73 (16) |
- ^{1} Playing statistics correct to the end of 1958.

Charles Bryan Martyn (27 December 1930 – 9 June 2002) was an Australian rules footballer who played with North Melbourne in the VFL during the 1950s.

Martyn won the 1957 Syd Barker Medal for being judged North Melbourne's best and fairest player, an award that his son Mick would later win twice.

He died from cancer on 9 June 2002, aged 71. Just days prior to his death, his son Mick got special AFL approval to wear the guernsey number 30 in his father's honour, which was the number Bryan wore for the latter half of his career. Mick said, "I didn't want to do it (wear Bryan's number) after he died. It was the greatest night of my life. It was better than winning a premiership. I wore two jumpers because I wanted to send one down with him, down the grave."
