= Andrew Dunkley =

Australian rules footballer

Personal information
- Full name: Andrew Dunkley
- Born: 29 June 1968 (age 58); South Gippsland
- Original team: North Launceston (TFL)/Devon Bombers (VIC)
- Height: 192 cm (6 ft 4 in)
- Weight: 100 kg (220 lb)
- Position: Defender

Playing career^{1}
Years	Club	Games (Goals)
1992–2002	Sydney	217 (11)

Representative team honours^{2}
Years	Team	Games (Goals)
1998	Victoria	? (?)
- ^{1} Playing statistics correct to the end of 2002.^{2} Representative statistics correct as of 1998.

Andrew Dunkley (born 29 June 1968) is a former Australian rules footballer who represented Sydney in the Australian Football League (AFL). He also represented Victoria in State of Origin in 1998.

== AFL career ==
Dunkley played most of his career at full-back at a time when champion forwards such as Tony Lockett, Wayne Carey, Tony Modra, Gary Ablett Sr., Jason Dunstall and various others graced the field. He was renowned for his competitiveness as well as his ordinary kicking skills. Dunkley was selected to play for the Swans in the 1996 AFL Grand Final, but took the field in controversial circumstances. On the Wednesday before the Grand Final, Dunkley was reported on video evidence – which was still relatively uncommon practice at the time – for striking Essendon's James Hird in the previous week's preliminary final. On the Thursday, Sydney successfully obtained a Supreme Court injunction to prevent the case from being heard until after the Grand Final, with the judge ruling that requiring Dunkley to face the tribunal only one day after learning of the charge and two days before the Grand Final would deny him natural justice and deny him the time required to prepare a defence. Consequently, Dunkley was free to play. When Dunkley ultimately faced the tribunal, he was suspended for three weeks.

== Post-AFL and personal life ==
After finishing his AFL career, Dunkley moved back to Victoria with his family where he played for and coached Leongatha Football Club. He is married to Lisa and has one daughter Lara who plays for the Queensland Firebirds in the Super Netball League, and two sons – Josh who currently plays for the Brisbane Lions in the AFL and Kyle who previously played AFL for the Melbourne Football Club and now plays for Brisbane Lions VFL team (2023).
