= Jason Mooney (Australian footballer) =

Australian rules footballer (born 1973)

Personal information
- Born: 5 June 1973 (age 53); Wagga Wagga, New South Wales
- Original team: Turvey Park (Riverina Football League)
- Height: 191 cm (6 ft 3 in)
- Weight: 95 kg (209 lb)

Playing career^{1}
Years	Club	Games (Goals)
1992 – 1998	Sydney	97 (51)
1999 – 2001	Geelong	32 (50)
Total		129 (101)
- ^{1} Playing statistics correct to the end of 2001.

Jason Mooney (born 5 June 1973) is a former Australian rules footballer who played with the Sydney and Geelong Football Clubs in the Australian Football League (AFL).

Mooney made his debut for Sydney in 1992 and played mostly as a defender and in the ruck. He played an important part in Sydney's 1996 Finals campaign, kicking three goals in their six-point Qualifying Final win over Hawthorn in the absence of star forward Tony Lockett. He was used as a centre half-forward in the 1996 Grand Final but finished on the losing team.

In the 1998 AFL draft he was traded to Geelong and kicked 33 goals in his debut season, finishing just one goal short of topping their goalkicking that year. His tally included a career best bag of five against Essendon in Round 11.

He is the older brother of Geelong premiership player Cameron Mooney and played alongside him in 2000 and 2001. His career was plagued by knee injuries and it ended his AFL career in 2001.
