= Glenn Freeborn =

Australian rules footballer

Personal information
- Nickname: Freezer
- Born: 6 February 1973 (age 53)
- Original team: Woodville-West Torrens (SANFL)
- Debut: Round 5, 30 April 1995, North Melbourne vs. Carlton, at the MCG

Playing career^{1}
| Years | Club | Games (Goals) |
| 1995–1998 | North Melbourne | 55 (27) |
| 1999–2003 | Collingwood | 83 (42) |
| Total | | 138 (69) |
- ^{1} Playing statistics correct to the end of 2003.

Career highlights
- North Melbourne premiership player 1996

Glenn Freeborn (born 6 February 1973) is a former Australian rules footballer for both North Melbourne (1995–1998) and Collingwood (1999–2003) in the Australian Football League (AFL). Originally drafted by Melbourne, Freeborn was delisted without playing a game. A durable utility, Freeborn is best known for his three goals in the Kangaroos' 1996 premiership triumph over Sydney. Many onlookers believe that Freeborn's three second term goals swung the game North Melbourne's way.

Upon reaching the Magpies at the end of 1998, Freeborn slotted in perfectly, playing the role of the sweeper across halfback, and was quite successful despite the team's lack of success. After a patchy 2000, Freeborn hit back over the following two seasons, missing only two matches as his side rose up the ladder and into the finals in 2002, whereupon the club then found their way into their first Grand Final since their famed victory in 1990.

In the match in the wet against Brisbane, Freeborn was outstanding off halfback and through the midfield, and again reaffirmed himself as one of the players the club would rely on for a cool head under pressure.

Surprisingly, Freeborn found it difficult to crack it for a regular place in the Magpies' 2003 line up, tipped out despite some reasonable early season form by the youth of Richard Cole, Rhyce Shaw and Matthew Lokan. Many believed that despite playing only three matches for the season, the club would have been well served had they opted to select the experience of Freeborn during the finals series, which ended with a crushing defeat by the Lions in the grand final.

Following his role in Williamstown's Victorian Football League premiership over Box Hill in 2003, Freeborn retired from football.

== Statistics ==
Legend
| G | Goals | K | Kicks | D | Disposals | T | Tackles |
| B | Behinds | H | Handballs | M | Marks |

| Season | Team | No. | Games | Totals | | | | | | | Averages (per game) | | | | | | |
| Season | Team | No. | Games | G | B | K | H | D | M | T | G | B | K | H | D | M | T |
|---|---|---|---|---|---|---|---|---|---|---|---|---|---|---|---|---|---|
| 1995 | North Melbourne | 17 | 9 | 4 | 5 | 51 | 47 | 98 | 15 | 14 | 0.4 | 0.6 | 5.7 | 5.2 | 10.9 | 1.7 | 1.6 |
| 1996† | North Melbourne | 17 | 19 | 13 | 14 | 129 | 92 | 221 | 35 | 31 | 0.7 | 0.7 | 6.8 | 4.8 | 11.6 | 1.8 | 1.6 |
| 1997 | North Melbourne | 17 | 18 | 5 | 8 | 92 | 64 | 156 | 15 | 28 | 0.3 | 0.4 | 5.1 | 3.6 | 8.7 | 0.8 | 1.6 |
| 1998 | North Melbourne | 17 | 9 | 5 | 1 | 38 | 37 | 75 | 13 | 13 | 0.6 | 0.1 | 4.2 | 4.1 | 8.3 | 1.4 | 1.4 |
| 1999 | Collingwood | 9 | 22 | 16 | 13 | 192 | 116 | 308 | 60 | 33 | 0.7 | 0.6 | 8.7 | 5.3 | 14.0 | 2.7 | 1.5 |
| 2000 | Collingwood | 9 | 13 | 11 | 6 | 115 | 81 | 196 | 53 | 15 | 0.8 | 0.5 | 8.8 | 6.2 | 15.1 | 4.1 | 1.2 |
| 2001 | Collingwood | 9 | 22 | 6 | 3 | 188 | 152 | 340 | 99 | 34 | 0.3 | 0.1 | 8.5 | 6.9 | 15.5 | 4.5 | 1.5 |
| 2002 | Collingwood | 9 | 23 | 8 | 7 | 163 | 157 | 320 | 69 | 54 | 0.3 | 0.3 | 7.1 | 6.8 | 13.9 | 3.0 | 2.3 |
| 2003 | Collingwood | 9 | 3 | 1 | 1 | 16 | 18 | 34 | 9 | 7 | 0.3 | 0.3 | 5.3 | 6.0 | 11.3 | 3.0 | 2.3 |
| Career | | | 138 | 69 | 58 | 984 | 764 | 1748 | 368 | 229 | 0.5 | 0.4 | 7.1 | 5.5 | 12.7 | 2.7 | 1.7 |
