= Dale Lewis (footballer) =

Australian rules footballer, born 1969

Personal information
- Full name: Dale Lewis
- Born: 4 May 1969 (age 57); Swan Hill, Victoria
- Original team: North Ballarat
- Height: 190 cm (6 ft 3 in)
- Weight: 84 kg (185 lb)

Playing career^{1}
Years	Club	Games (Goals)
1990–2001	Sydney	182 (186)
- ^{1} Playing statistics correct to the end of 2001.

Dale Lewis (born 4 May 1969) is a former Australian rules footballer who represented Sydney in the 1990s and early 2000s.

== Early life and career ==
A Hawthorn supporter, Lewis moved with his family from Swan Hill to Ballarat when he was eight years old, and except for his time at the Swans, he was an itinerant footballer.

Lewis played junior football with North Ballarat and made his senior debut with the Roosters in 1988 before spending two summer seasons playing with Darwin club St Mary's, alongside future Essendon champion Michael Long.

In 1989, Lewis played alongside brother Wes in Torquay’s premiership side and returned to North Ballarat for the 1990 season.

By this time almost every AFL club was aware of his prodigious talents and lined up to secure his services in the mid-season draft. On his 21st birthday Lewis received a call from childhood hero Peter Knights, who inquired whether Lewis was able to play for him at Tasmanian club Devonport. He also received a call from Brisbane Bears recruiter Shane O'Sullivan who said the Bears wanted to take Lewis as the number one selection at the pre-season draft.

Just before the 1990 mid-season draft, Lewis kicked seven goals for North Ballarat in an inter-league game and caught the eye of scouts. He trained with six clubs in the next few weeks before the Swans made him their first pick.

While Lewis was keen to play AFL, he wanted to play for a Victorian club. Shortly before getting drafted, he met football manager John Reid in Melbourne, who told Lewis that if the Bears did not list him, the Swans would and if he didn't like it he could stand out of League football for two years. As it turned out, Brisbane named South Australian Laurence Schache and the Swans, true to their word, took Lewis at number two.

Lewis made his AFL debut against Footscray at the Western Oval in Round 15 of the 1990 AFL season. He played up on the wing against Leon Cameron, who would also enjoy a long and successful AFL career. Lewis scored a goal with his first kick, courtesy of a handpass from teammate David Murphy.

Over his career, Lewis would be used in a range of positions. He even played one game at full-back on Melbourne’s Allen Jakovich.

At the time of his arrival, Sydney was a team falling apart in the post-Edelsten era. While Lewis showed flashes of individual brilliance and established himself as a regular senior player, it was usually in a losing team. In 1993, he missed out on the victory against Melbourne that broke a 26-game losing streak due to injury.

At the end of 1993, Lewis returned to Melbourne, where his parents ran two hotels, and asked to be traded. But a deal with North Melbourne fell through just before the trading deadline. Lewis stuck with the Swans and was rewarded with their form turning around. The Swans finished the 1996 Home and Away season in top spot. In the Preliminary Final against Essendon, with the Swans trailing by 2 goals late in the match Lewis kicked a goal after marking in the goal square. The Swans won that match by 1 point. A week later, Lewis played in the 1996 AFL Grand Final.

In 1997, Lewis played for Victoria against South Australia.

== After football ==
After retiring as a footballer, Lewis began a career in broadcasting. He was a commentator on Australia's Seven Network and appeared on the sports program The Fat. Lewis was also a member of the Talking League team on Australian radio station 2UE.

In 2002, Lewis made the claim that he thought "75% of AFL players would have 'done'/[taken] illicit drugs" at some point in their career. This was met with an immediate backlash and denials within the AFL industry, but years later was seen to have been prescient and possibly also accurate.

Lewis had a stint as coach of Norwood in 2005. He has worked in Adelaide as part of the Triple M radio breakfast show and as an AFL commentator.

Lewis has taken on a role of head coach of the Burnside Jets Basketball Team as of 2020.
