= Denis Pagan =

Australian rules footballer, born 1947

Personal information
- Full name: Denis Leslie Pagan
- Born: 24 September 1947 (age 79)
- Original team: Carlton U19
- Height: 183 cm (6 ft 0 in)
- Weight: 85 kg (187 lb)

Playing career^{1}
Years	Club	Games (Goals)
1967–1974	North Melbourne	120 (5)
1975–1976	South Melbourne	23 (0)
1978	Port Melbourne	3 (5)
1979–1980	Yarraville	14 (23)
Total		160 (33)

Representative team honours
Years	Team	Games (Goals)
1971	Victoria	

Coaching career^{3}
Years	Club	Games (W–L–D)
1993–2002	North Melbourne	240 (150–90–0)
2003–2007	Carlton	104 (25–77–2)
Total		344 (175–167–2)
- ^{1} Playing statistics correct to the end of 1976.^{3} Coaching statistics correct as of 2007.

Career highlights
- AFL Premiership coach: 1996, 1999; All-Australian Team coach: 1999; North Melbourne Team of the Century: coach

Denis Leslie Pagan (born 24 September 1947) is a former Australian rules football coach and player in the VFL/AFL. He led North Melbourne to AFL premierships as coach in 1996 and 1999.

== Playing career ==
=== North Melbourne ===
Pagan played 120 games for the North Melbourne Football Club between 1967 and 1974, kicking 5 goals, mainly due to his permanent spot as a hard-nosed defender in the back pocket. He represented Victoria in interstate matches in 1971.

After the Grand Final loss to Richmond in 1974, Pagan was pushed out of North Melbourne by senior coach Ron Barassi and Pagan's dwindling form and the club's reassessment of its squad in the aftermath of 1974 loss was the factor that caused Pagan's departure from North Melbourne Football Club.

=== South Melbourne ===
Pagan then moved to South Melbourne for two seasons from 1975 until 1976, playing 23 games and kicking 0 goals. However, these events did not deter Pagan from his dedication to the North Melbourne football club, despite Barassi's authoritative coaching style.

=== Port Melbourne Football Club (VFA) ===
In 1978, Pagan played for Port Melbourne in the Victorian Football Association.

== Coaching career ==
=== Early coaching career ===
Pagan's coaching career began when he took the role of captain-coach of the Yarraville Football Club in the VFA second division in 1979. He piloted the team to the 1980 minor premiership and Grand Final, but the club lost the Grand Final against Brunswick. Pagan then returned to North Melbourne, and had great success as its Under-19s coach over the following decade. Pagan led the team to nine consecutive Under-19s Grand Finals from 1983 to 1991, resulting in five premierships: in 1984, 1987, 1988, 1990 and 1991. After the AFL's Under-19s competition was disbanded at the end of 1991, Pagan was signed by the Essendon Football Club, where he led its reserves team to the Victorian State Football League premiership in 1992.

=== North Melbourne Football Club ===
Pagan returned again to North Melbourne in the 1993 season, and was appointed senior coach. He had an immediate impact at the Kangaroos, taking the side to the finals that year. Pagan led North Melbourne to a premiership in 1996. Pagan also led North Melbourne to the 1998 AFL Grand Final but fell short and lost to Adelaide. Pagan then led North Melbourne to another premiership in 1999 and reached at least the preliminary final every year from 1994 to 2000.

He was known for pioneering a successful tactic which was termed "Pagan's Paddock", based around his key forward Wayne Carey. The coaching strategy involved moving all forwards out of the 50-metre arc and midfielders bombing the ball into empty space. The key forwards would run with the flight of the ball to take a mark or running goal.

By the end of his term at North Melbourne, he had established an impeccable reputation as a senior AFL coach and the longest serving coach in the club's history. His worst season at North Melbourne was in the 2001 season, when the club missed the finals for the only time during his 10-year term at the club.

Pagan quit as senior coach of North Melbourne Football Club at the end of the 2002 season, despite the team finishing 7th, which was a better result than expected after Wayne Carey left the club at the beginning of the year after his much-publicised affair. Pagan then went to sign a lucrative deal with the Carlton Football Club. Pagan was then replaced by Dean Laidley as senior coach of North Melbourne.

=== Carlton Football Club ===
At the end of 2002, Pagan was appointed senior coach of the Carlton Football Club, replacing Wayne Brittain, after Brittain was sacked when Carlton under Brittain finished sixteenth (last-on the ladder position) for the wooden spoon in the 2002 season. Brittain had a year remaining on his contract, and was paid out by the club. Pagan's attempt to rebuild the side was not helped by the fact the club had been hit with salary cap breaches which prevented the club from rebuilding its playing list in the short term. As a result of these penalties, in Pagan's first season as Carlton Football Club senior coach in the 2003 season, Carlton under Pagan endured another unsuccessful season, finishing fifteenth (second-last) on the ladder with four wins and eighteen losses. Employing a recycled player policy in an attempt to rebuild the team for the 2004 season where Pagan led Carlton to eleventh on the ladder with ten wins and twelve losses, which was Carlton's highest placing under Pagan, and carried this into a pre-season premiership in the 2005 Wizard Cup. However, this proved to be a false dawn, when Carlton under Pagan ended up receiving two consecutive wooden spoons in the 2005 season with four wins, one draw and seventeen losses, and in the 2006 season with three wins, one draw and eighteen losses. There were talks that he may have been sacked at this point, in a club board meeting coup led by club president Graham Smorgon; however, it was decided to extend his contract until the end of the 2008 season.

Carlton under Pagan did not improve much in the 2007 season, sitting at fourteenth on the ladder after Round 16, 2007 with four wins and twelve losses. Between Rounds 12 and 16, Carlton suffered five consecutive heavy defeats, the last of which was a 117-point defeat against the Brisbane Lions at the Gabba in Round 16, 2007. It proved to be the nail in the coffin for Pagan and his job, and Pagan was sacked as Carlton Football Club senior coach the following day on 23 July 2007. He was not bitter at the club's decision, and wanted to go on record that he would never have quit as the coach of the Carlton Football Club. Pagan was replaced by assistant coach Brett Ratten as caretaker senior coach for the remainder of the 2007 season, who was eventually appointed full-time senior coach of Carlton. Pagan had a year to go on his contract which was paid out in full by the club.

In 2014, Pagan stated in the Sydney Morning Herald that coaching Carlton was "a very difficult assignment", also taking into consideration the fact that the club had lost valuable draft picks in the wake of the salary cap breaches. In 2021, Pagan in a radio interview with SEN described his tenure as senior coach of Carlton as a “snake pit” because of "Divisions and disunity" at the club that he experienced. In 2022, Pagan further elaborated by stating "When I was at Carlton I don't think I've ever seen a bigger mess. It was like going to work every day and a little bloke hiding behind the door with a sledgehammer and whacking you around the chin. They didn't have a great list, they didn't have any money, the place was in turmoil, there was factions and splits everywhere. It was a great club and it just disintegrated. It was the biggest regret without any doubt whatsoever".

== Post coaching-career ==
In 2008, Pagan became a board member at North Melbourne Football Club. However, after the 2008 season he left the position to coach the Northern Knights in the TAC under 18s competition for one season only.

In 2020, Pagan was the horse trainer of Victoria Derby winner Johnny Get Angry.

== Legacy and reception ==
Pagan has been described as a "meticulous planner, an inspirational leader of men and for the relentless pursuit of excellence". Beyond dispute is the indelible mark Pagan has left on the game of Australian football". He ranks 16th on the list of most senior VFL/AFL games coached and a two-time premiership coach. Pagan's coaching philosophies have also been described as being based upon "communication, teaching, people management and leadership". In 2018, Pagan was inducted as coaching legend in the AFL Coaches Association awards in recognition of the significant achievement and excellence over his time of a former AFL coach.

Former North Melbourne captain Wayne Carey who played under Pagan in Pagan's tenure as senior coach of North Melbourne described Pagan as the man to "turn the place around" where "He'd clean the place out," and under Pagan players would have a go, if they didn't have a go, they wouldn't be in the side. "He'd tell you how it is, he'd tell everyone within the club where they're at. "It's hard-nosed basic training."

Former North Melbourne and Carlton player Corey McKernan who played under Pagan in both Pagan's tenures as senior coach of North Melbourne and Carlton both praised and was critical of Pagan, where Pagan was famously tough on his players and it wore McKernan down over the years stating "he and Pagan had a deep respect, but by the end it was a non-working relationship" furthermore "there was an enormous amount of respect for Pagan, but at the end of the day it wasn’t getting the best out of one another,” and "I wasn't enjoying my football and wasn't enjoying the environment that we were playing in" and “Our relationship didn’t work in the end but trust me, for the stuff we did together I am incredibly grateful and I think of the habits Denis has taught me".

Former Carlton Football Club Captain Anthony Koutoufides who played under Pagan in Pagan's tenure as senior coach of Carlton was critical of Pagan by stating "he was unfair on players and had an outdated game plan, which the players did not believe in".

Former North Melbourne player Adam Simpson who played under Pagan in Pagan's tenure as senior coach of North Melbourne praised Pagan by stating “What I wanted to do was just prove myself to Denis, that I was a good player, that I could handle whatever he put in front of me ... it didn't take a lot to get the best out of me, because I just wanted to please him”.

Former North Melbourne player John Longmire who played under Pagan in Pagan's tenure as senior coach of North Melbourne praised Pagan by stating “He got the best out of his players because he knew which players to push, and push in some instances really hard. But also which players to put an arm around and when”.

Legendary AFL coach Mick Malthouse has also praised Pagan by stating “I had a great respect for Denis’ capabilities as a coach. From a distance, probably his greatest strength was that he had no fear”.

== Statistics ==
=== Playing statistics ===
Legend
G	Goals	K	Kicks	D	Disposals	T	Tackles
B	Behinds	H	Handballs	M	Marks

Season	Team	No.	Games	Totals							Averages (per game)						
Season	Team	No.	Games	G	B	K	H	D	M	T	G	B	K	H	D	M	T
1967	North Melbourne	45	7	2	5	55	1	56	11	—N/a	0.3	0.7	7.9	0.1	8.0	1.6	—N/a
1968	North Melbourne	26	16	3	4	243	8	251	53	—N/a	0.2	0.3	15.2	0.5	15.7	3.3	—N/a
1969	North Melbourne	17	19	0	0	295	10	305	69	—N/a	0.0	0.0	15.5	0.5	16.1	3.6	—N/a
1970	North Melbourne	17	17	0	0	274	20	294	63	—N/a	0.0	0.0	16.1	1.2	17.3	3.7	—N/a
1971	North Melbourne	17	16	0	0	278	20	298	65	—N/a	0.0	0.0	17.4	1.3	18.6	4.1	—N/a
1972	North Melbourne	17	18	0	0	280	13	293	66	—N/a	0.0	0.0	15.6	0.7	16.3	3.7	—N/a
1973	North Melbourne	17	12	0	0	146	13	159	22	—N/a	0.0	0.0	12.2	1.1	13.3	1.8	—N/a
1974	North Melbourne	17	15	0	0	171	19	190	17	—N/a	0.0	0.0	11.4	1.3	12.7	1.1	—N/a
1975	South Melbourne	6	7	0	0	77	7	84	10	—N/a	0.0	0.0	12.8	1.2	14.0	1.7	—N/a
1976	South Melbourne	6	16	0	0	165	24	189	27	—N/a	0.0	0.0	10.3	1.5	11.8	1.7	—N/a
Career			143	5	9	1984	135	2119	403	—N/a	0.0	0.1	14.0	1.0	14.9	2.8	—N/a

=== Coaching statistics ===
Legend
W	Wins	L	Losses	D	Draws	W%	Winning percentage	LP	Ladder position	LT	League teams

Season	Team	Games	W	L	D	W %	LP	LT
1993	North Melbourne	21	13	8	0	61.9%	3	15
1994	North Melbourne	24	14	10	0	58.3%	3	15
1995	North Melbourne	25	16	9	0	64.0%	6	16
1996	North Melbourne	25	19	6	0	76.0%	2	16
1997	North Melbourne	25	14	11	0	56.0%	7	16
1998	North Melbourne	25	18	7	0	72.0%	1	16
1999	Kangaroos	25	20	5	0	80.0%	2	16
2000	Kangaroos	25	15	10	0	60.0%	4	16
2001	Kangaroos	22	9	13	0	40.9%	13	16
2002	Kangaroos	23	12	11	0	52.2%	7	16
2003	Carlton	22	4	18	0	18.2%	15	16
2004	Carlton	22	10	12	0	45.5%	11	16
2005	Carlton	22	4	17	1	20.5%	16	16
2006	Carlton	22	3	18	1	15.9%	16	16
2007	Carlton	16	4	12	0	25.0%	15	16
Career totals		344	175	167	2	51.2%		
