= Anthony Stevens =

Australian footballer

Personal information
- Nickname: Stevo
- Born: 2 July 1971 (age 55)
- Original team: Waaia
- Draft: No. 18, 1988 national draft
- Height: 178 cm (5 ft 10 in)
- Weight: 81 kg (179 lb)

Playing career^{1}
Years	Club	Games (Goals)
1989–2004	North Melbourne	292 (127)
- ^{1} Playing statistics correct to the end of 2004.

Career highlights
- 2x North Melbourne Premiership Player: (1996, 1999); All-Australian Team : (1998); Victorian State of Origin Player: (1998); 2x North Melbourne Best and Fairest: (1997, 1999); Named in the North Melbourne Team of the Century (Ruck Rover); Named as an Australian Football Hall of Fame member (2017)

Anthony Stevens (born 2 July 1971) is a former Australian rules footballer who played for the North Melbourne Kangaroos. He was named as ruck rover in the club's official 'Team of the Century'.

Stevens was a member of North Melbourne premiership sides in 1996 and 1999. In 1998, he was an All-Australian; additionally, in the same year, he represented Victoria at State of Origin football. He was a Best and Fairest winner for his club twice, in 1997 and 1999.

Stevens lost two litres of blood and had two operations after injuries caused when falling glass hit Stevens outside the Redback Brewery Hotel in North Melbourne on 11 March 2000. Stevens suffered a 20-centimetre gash from the corner of his mouth along his right cheek and down the side of his mouth.

In 2002, he was involved in a much-publicised controversy involving Wayne Carey after it was revealed that Carey had been having an extramarital affair with his wife Kelli Stevens.

After Stevens retired at the end of the 2004 season, he and former Kangaroos teammate Glenn Archer played a match for the Caulfield Grammarians Football Club. Stevens accepted an ambassadorship with the VCFL, and played with Benalla in the Goulburn Valley Football League for a number of years.

== Personal life ==
In March 2002, it was widely publicised that Stevens's wife Kelli and Stevens's teammate Wayne Carey were having an extramarital affair. Kelli and Anthony Stevens divorced in 2008.

Stevens' son, River Stevens, was drafted by North Melbourne in November 2024.

== Statistics ==
Legend
G	Goals	K	Kicks	D	Disposals	T	Tackles
B	Behinds	H	Handballs	M	Marks

Season	Team	No.	Games	Totals							Averages (per game)						
Season	Team	No.	Games	G	B	K	H	D	M	T	G	B	K	H	D	M	T
1989	North Melbourne	58	4	0	3	41	20	61	8	11	0.0	0.8	10.3	5.0	15.3	2.0	2.8
1990	North Melbourne	46	13	4	6	149	51	200	30	31	0.3	0.5	11.5	3.9	15.4	2.3	2.4
1991	North Melbourne	10	12	2	2	135	58	193	19	11	0.2	0.2	11.3	4.8	16.1	1.6	0.9
1992	North Melbourne	10	13	11	10	149	71	220	26	39	0.8	0.8	11.5	5.5	16.9	2.0	3.0
1993	North Melbourne	10	21	9	11	330	118	448	36	66	0.4	0.5	15.7	5.6	21.3	1.7	3.1
1994	North Melbourne	10	24	8	11	341	191	532	64	57	0.3	0.5	14.2	8.0	22.2	2.7	2.4
1995	North Melbourne	10	20	14	8	304	137	441	65	49	0.7	0.4	15.2	6.9	22.1	3.3	2.5
1996	North Melbourne	10	24	19	15	385	156	541	86	59	0.8	0.6	16.0	6.5	22.5	3.6	2.5
1997	North Melbourne	10	25	10	7	453	129	582	94	66	0.4	0.3	18.1	5.2	23.3	3.8	2.6
1998	North Melbourne	10	25	8	6	442	101	543	90	74	0.3	0.2	17.7	4.0	21.7	3.6	3.0
1999	Kangaroos	10	25	12	7	429	117	546	98	72	0.5	0.3	17.2	4.7	21.8	3.9	2.9
2000	Kangaroos	10	12	4	4	145	63	208	50	32	0.3	0.3	12.1	5.3	17.3	4.2	2.7
2001	Kangaroos	10	15	1	5	238	104	342	68	71	0.1	0.3	15.9	6.9	22.8	4.5	4.7
2002	Kangaroos	10	19	10	6	276	99	375	85	65	0.5	0.3	14.5	5.2	19.7	4.5	3.4
2003	Kangaroos	10	20	10	8	275	155	430	92	63	0.5	0.4	13.8	7.8	21.5	4.6	3.2
2004	Kangaroos	10	20	5	3	262	109	371	86	52	0.3	0.2	13.1	5.5	18.6	4.3	2.6
Career			292	127	112	4354	1679	6033	997	818	0.4	0.4	14.9	5.8	20.7	3.4	2.8
