= John Blakey =

Australian rules footballer

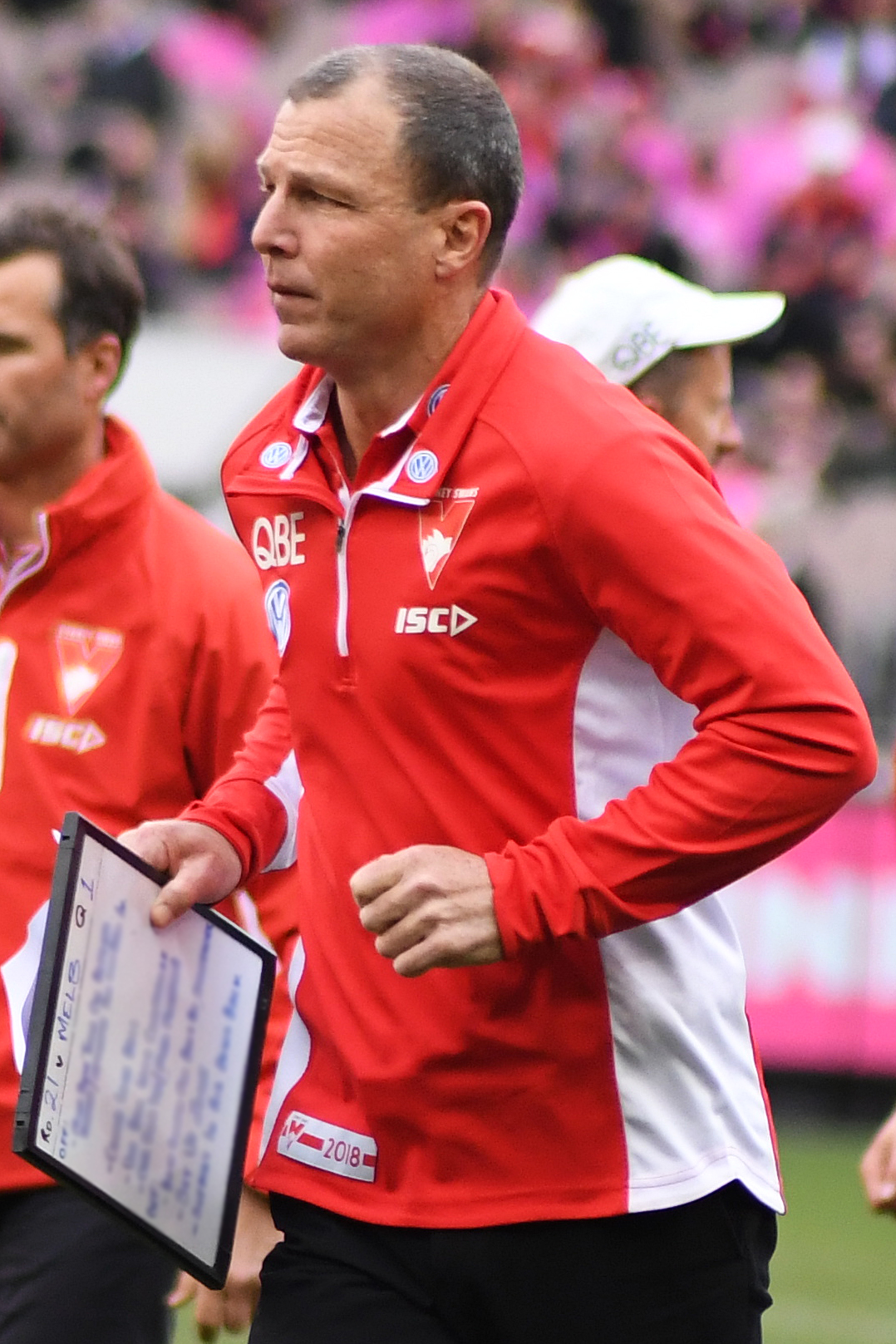
- Blakey with Sydney in August 2018

Personal information
- Full name: John Blakey
- Born: 24 July 1966 (age 60)
- Original team: East Doncaster
- Height: 187 cm (6 ft 2 in)
- Weight: 83 kg (183 lb)
- Positions: Midfielder, defender

Playing career^{1}
Years	Club	Games (Goals)
1985–1992	Fitzroy	135 (38)
1993–2002	North Melbourne	224 (72)
Total		359 (110)

Coaching career
Years	Club	Games (W–L–D)
2005	Brisbane Lions	1 (0–1–0)
- ^{1} Playing statistics correct to the end of 2002.

Career highlights
- 2× AFL premiership player: 1996, 1999; Victorian State of Origin Player: (1998)

John Blakey (born 24 July 1966) is a former Australian rules footballer who played 359 games in the Australian Football League.

== Football career ==
=== Playing ===
Recruited from Doncaster East Football Club, Blakey debuted for the Fitzroy Football Club in 1985, and went on to be used in a variety of midfield positions. He went on to play 135 games (for 38 goals) with the Fitzroy Lions until 1992. He switched to the North Melbourne Football Club in 1993 and went on to be a stalwart for the club. He played in the 1996 and 1999 premiership sides and went on to play 224 games for 72 goals until he retired in 2002 at 36 years of age. His total of 359 games places him 14th on the list of most games in VFL/AFL football and has played the most games in the VFL/AFL without playing in a draw. He also played in a record seven consecutive preliminary finals for the Kangaroos (along with teammates Wayne Carey, David King, Mick Martyn, Corey McKernan & Craig Sholl) from 1994 to 2000.

He represented Victoria in State of Origin in 1998.

=== Coaching and support ===
Following his retirement, Blakey became the assistant coach at the Brisbane Lions in 2003 and coached the team when he filled in as caretaker interim senior coach in the absence of regular senior coach Leigh Matthews whose mother had died, for one game in Round 18, 2005 against the Western Bulldogs in which the Lions lost. In 2007, he moved to the Sydney Swans where he served as Coaching Director and Head of Development, remaining there until the end of the 2020 season when he returned to North Melbourne as senior assistant coach.

== Statistics ==
=== Playing statistics ===
Legend
G	Goals	K	Kicks	D	Disposals	T	Tackles
B	Behinds	H	Handballs	M	Marks

Season	Team	No.	Games	Totals							Averages (per game)						
Season	Team	No.	Games	G	B	K	H	D	M	T	G	B	K	H	D	M	T
1985	Fitzroy	54	4	0	1	21	21	42	7	—	0.0	0.3	5.3	5.3	10.5	1.8	—
1986	Fitzroy	18	23	2	3	166	135	301	66	—	0.1	0.1	7.2	5.9	13.1	2.9	—
1987	Fitzroy	18	11	2	0	67	64	131	24	12	0.2	0.0	6.1	5.8	11.9	2.2	1.1
1988	Fitzroy	18	20	6	7	198	159	357	87	24	0.3	0.4	9.9	8.0	17.9	4.4	1.2
1989	Fitzroy	18	20	7	5	216	136	352	66	28	0.4	0.3	10.8	6.8	17.6	3.3	1.4
1990	Fitzroy	18	19	6	6	205	129	334	67	20	0.3	0.3	10.8	6.8	17.6	3.5	1.1
1991	Fitzroy	18	20	8	11	210	142	352	59	23	0.4	0.6	10.5	7.1	17.6	3.0	1.2
1992	Fitzroy	18	18	7	13	181	109	290	66	38	0.4	0.7	10.1	6.1	16.1	3.7	2.1
1993	North Melbourne	12	17	3	4	144	87	231	38	22	0.2	0.2	8.5	5.1	13.6	2.2	1.3
1994	North Melbourne	12	24	8	7	222	129	351	72	33	0.3	0.3	9.3	5.4	14.6	3.0	1.4
1995	North Melbourne	12	25	11	13	236	151	387	92	27	0.4	0.5	9.4	6.0	15.5	3.7	1.1
1996	North Melbourne	12	24	9	12	225	129	354	74	33	0.4	0.5	9.4	5.4	14.8	3.1	1.4
1997	North Melbourne	12	24	6	9	218	107	325	70	33	0.3	0.4	9.1	4.5	13.5	2.9	1.4
1998	North Melbourne	12	25	10	12	258	118	376	97	27	0.4	0.5	10.3	4.7	15.0	3.9	1.1
1999	North Melbourne	12	25	11	3	271	118	389	101	17	0.4	0.1	10.8	4.7	15.6	4.0	0.7
2000	North Melbourne	12	25	10	8	299	158	457	128	26	0.4	0.3	12.0	6.3	18.3	5.1	1.0
2001	North Melbourne	12	22	1	5	225	189	414	119	18	0.0	0.2	10.2	8.6	18.8	5.4	0.8
2002	North Melbourne	12	13	3	0	62	62	124	35	14	0.2	0.0	4.8	4.8	9.5	2.7	1.1
Career			359	110	119	3424	2143	5567	1268	395	0.3	0.3	9.5	6.0	15.5	3.5	1.2

=== Coaching statistics ===
Legend
W	Wins	L	Losses	D	Draws	W%	Winning percentage	LP	Ladder position	LT	League teams

Season	Team	Games	W	L	D	W %	LP	LT
2005*	Brisbane Lions	1	0	1	0	0.0%	—N/a	16
Career totals		1	0	1	0	0.0%		

* = Caretaker Coach

== Personal life ==
Blakey's son, Nick, was drafted by the Sydney Swans in the 2018 AFL draft.
