= Matthew Lappin =

Australian rules footballer, born 1976

Personal information
- Full name: Matthew Lappin
- Nickname: Skinny
- Born: 17 February 1976 (age 50); Australia
- Original teams: Chiltern, Wangaratta
- Height: 184 cm (6 ft 0 in)
- Weight: 77 kg (170 lb)

Playing career^{1}
Years	Club	Games (Goals)
1994–1998	St Kilda	55 (26)
1999–2007	Carlton	196 (221)
Total		251 (247)
- ^{1} Playing statistics correct to the end of 2007.

Career highlights
- Carlton Leading Goalkicker 2001; International rules series 2001, 2005, 2006; All-Australian 2004; AFL Mark of the Year 1999

Matthew Lappin (born 17 February 1976) is a former professional Australian rules footballer who played for the St Kilda Football Club and the Carlton Football Club in the Australian Football League (AFL).

Lappin played in Chiltern's losing 1992 and 1993 O&KFL senior football grand final sides, alongside his cousin, Nigel Lappin, prior to being picked up at number 40 by St. Kilda in the 1993 AFL draft. Debuting with St Kilda in 1994, Lappin was known as a half-back flanker.

Lappin played in 17 of 22 matches in the 1997 season home and away rounds in which St Kilda qualified in first position for the 1997 Finals Series, winning the club's 2nd minor premiership and 1st McClelland Trophy.

At the end of the 1998 season, Lappin moved to Carlton, where in the first quarter of the club's round 1 match against Essendon he took a specky on the goal-line which would go on to win the Mark of the Year for 1999.

Throughout his playing career, Lappin was recognised on the field due to his lightly built frame, for which he attracted the nickname "Skinny".

Following his retirement from playing, Lappin remained with Carlton as an assistant coach, as well as acting as a playing assistant coach with the Northern Bullants (as a VFL- listed player). He served as Carlton's forward line coach from 2008 until 2010. In 2011, he shifted into an assistant coaching role at Collingwood.

On 22 August 2015 Lappin played for the Gold Coast Suns reserves team as a result of the team's player shortages due to injuries.

He then served as an AFL coach for the JLC at Hillcrest Christian College Queensland.

Lappin has since been signed on as the Southport Sharks QAFLW head coach for the 2025 season.

== Statistics ==
Legend
G	Goals	K	Kicks	D	Disposals	T	Tackles
B	Behinds	H	Handballs	M	Marks

Season	Team	No.	Games	Totals							Averages (per game)						
Season	Team	No.	Games	G	B	K	H	D	M	T	G	B	K	H	D	M	T
1994	St Kilda	37	9	1	1	78	36	114	23	9	0.11	0.11	8.67	4	12.67	2.56	1
1995	St Kilda	22	3	0	0	23	14	37	7	3	0	0	7.67	4.67	12.33	2.33	1
1996	St Kilda	22	7	0	0	60	51	111	28	9	0	0	8.57	7.29	15.86	4	1.29
1997	St Kilda	22	20	20	19	154	135	289	57	35	1	0.95	7.7	6.75	14.45	2.85	1.75
1998	St Kilda	22	20	20	19	154	135	289	57	35	1	0.95	7.7	6.75	14.45	2.85	1.75
1999	Carlton	12	25	33	21	246	149	395	115	25	1.32	0.84	9.84	5.96	15.8	4.6	1
2000	Carlton	12	24	33	21	280	145	425	114	44	1.38	0.88	11.67	6.04	17.71	4.75	1.83
2001	Carlton	12	23	49	33	301	139	440	128	37	2.13	1.43	13.09	6.04	19.13	5.57	1.61
2002	Carlton	12	21	22	20	207	120	327	77	32	1.05	0.95	9.86	5.71	15.57	3.67	1.52
2003	Carlton	12	22	10	3	284	119	403	103	47	0.45	0.14	12.91	5.41	18.32	4.68	2.14
2004	Carlton	12	22	23	7	323	122	445	114	42	1.05	0.32	14.68	5.55	20.23	5.18	1.91
2005	Carlton	12	22	25	14	239	132	371	104	45	1.14	0.64	10.86	6	16.86	4.73	2.05
2006	Carlton	12	19	5	9	253	134	387	116	38	0.26	0.47	13.32	7.05	20.37	6.11	2
2007	Carlton	12	18	21	12	162	95	257	92	25	1.17	0.67	9	5.28	14.28	5.11	1.39
Career			251	247	167	2715	1472	4187	1121	414	0.95	0.65	10.31	5.77	16.09	4.20	1.57

== Personal life ==
Lappin's first daughter Olivia was born on 4 December 1998. One of his other daughters, Sunny, is an AFLW player with the Gold Coast Suns.

He is the cousin of Nigel Lappin, who played for the Brisbane Bears and Brisbane Lions.
