= Adam Simpson =

Australian rules footballer and coach

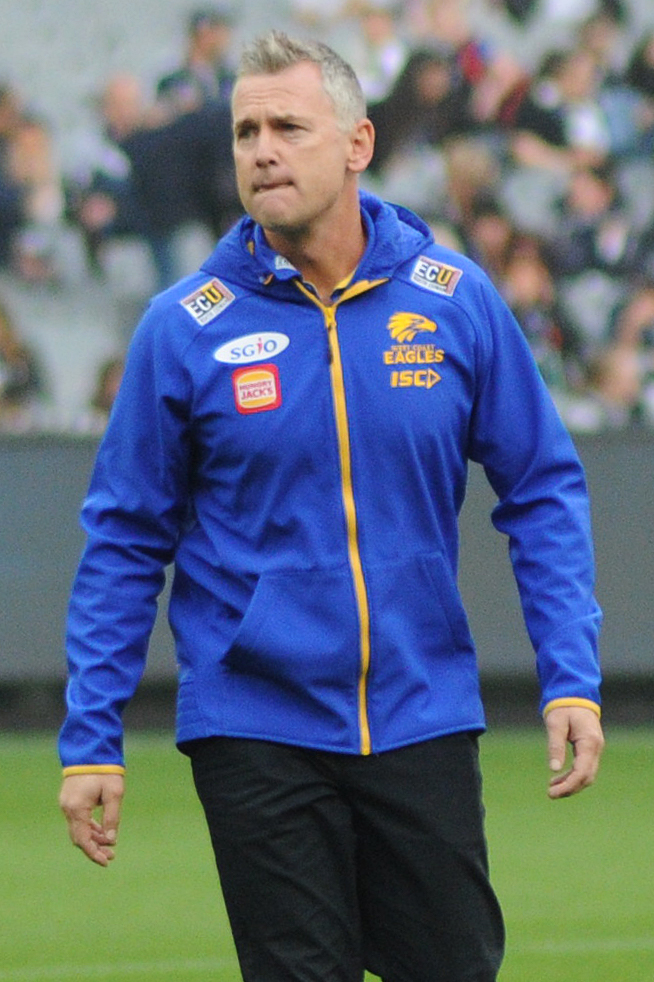
- Simpson with West Coast in April 2018

Personal information
- Full name: Adam Simpson
- Nickname: Simmo
- Born: 16 February 1976 (age 50)
- Original team: Eltham (DVFL)/Northern Knights (TAC Cup)
- Draft: No. 14, 1993 national draft
- Height: 185 cm (6 ft 1 in)
- Weight: 86 kg (190 lb)
- Positions: Midfielder, defender

Playing career^{1}
Years	Club	Games (Goals)
1995–2009	North Melbourne	306 (83)

International team honours
Years	Team	Games (Goals)
2002–2003	Australia	4 (0)

Coaching career^{3}
Years	Club	Games (W–L–D)
2014–2024	West Coast	242 (122–119–1)
- ^{1} Playing statistics correct to the end of 2009.^{3} Coaching statistics correct as of round 17, 2024.

Career highlights
- Club: 2× AFL premiership player: 1996, 1999; AFL Rising Star nominee: 1996; Syd Barker Medal: 2002; All-Australian team: 2002; North Melbourne captain: 2004–2008; Coaching: AFL premiership coach: 2018; All-Australian team: 2018

Adam Simpson (born 16 February 1976) is a former Australian rules footballer and coach. A left-footed midfielder, his playing career for North Melbourne spanned from 1995 to 2009, where he played 306 games. He coached West Coast from 2014 until parting ways during the 2024 season, having led them to the 2018 premiership.

From Melbourne, Simpson played junior football for Eltham and the Northern Knights before being recruited to North Melbourne at the 1993 National Draft. He made his debut during the 1995 season, and won a premiership the following year, during which he was also nominated for the AFL Rising Star award. Another premiership followed in 1999, and in 2002, Simpson was named in the All-Australian team and also won North Melbourne's best and fairest award, the Syd Barker Medal. He was appointed club captain in 2004, and held the position until stepping down at the end of the 2008 season, with his span including a preliminary final in 2007. Simpson played his 300th game in 2009, the third North Melbourne player to do so, and finished his career towards the end of the season. He was appointed coach of West Coast in October 2013, replacing John Worsfold.

== Early life ==
Simpson grew up in the north-eastern suburbs of Melbourne where he played junior football for Eltham in the suburban Diamond Valley Football League. He also played under-18 football for Northern Knights. Simpson also had a stint in the East Gippsland town of Sale where he was part of an under 15's premiership under coach Vince Moro.

As a child, Simpson supported the Carlton Football Club, the club whom he would play his final AFL game against in 2009.

He attended school at St Helena Secondary College.

== Playing career ==
=== North Melbourne ===
Simpson was recruited by North Melbourne at the 1993 National Draft. He made his senior debut for the club against the Eagles in round 18 at Princes Park during the 1995 season. The following season, he played for North Melbourne in the 1996 AFL Grand Final win over Sydney. Earlier in the season, he was nominated for the Rising Star award. Simpson also played a key midfield role for North Melbourne when the team won the 1999 Grand Final. In 2002, he won the club best and fairest award (Syd Barker Medal) and he was named in the All-Australian team.

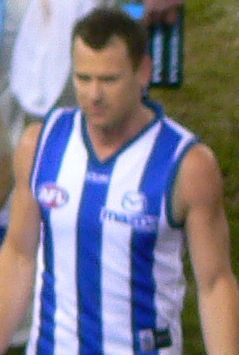
Simpson with North Melbourne in 2007

Simpson was appointed club captain in 2004, and he led the Kangaroos into the finals the following year.

In 2005, the skipper narrowly missed recording a fifth consecutive top-three finish in the club best and fairest. He finished 4th, one vote behind 3rd and 2 votes shy of second. That year he missed two games with a punctured lung, but he still tallied over 400 disposals for the season with his industrious playmaking style.

Round 5, 2007, he racked up a career equalling high 41 disposals, including a goal, in the Roos 16 point win against Geelong at Kardinia Park. Weeks later, he played his 250th game against Carlton in a home game at Carrara on the Gold Coast. North Melbourne won the game 22-13 (147) to 20-10 (130). Simpson had 20 disposals. At the end of the game, his teammates celebrated his 250 milestone by chairlifting him from the field.

On 5 November 2008, Adam Simpson announced he was stepping down as captain but he would continue playing in 2009. Brent Harvey became the new captain.

In April 2009. Simpson, Daniel Pratt and five other North Melbourne players admitted to producing a YouTube video entitled "The Adventures of Little Boris". The video was of a rubber chicken named Boris performing sexual acts on the carcass of a chicken. Simpson and Pratt were fined $5000 each by North Melbourne.

Simpson retired during the 2009 season. With North Melbourne out of finals contention, Simpson announced his retirement on 27 July 2009. He played the last of his 306 games on Friday night against Carlton in round 18 at Docklands on 31 July He ended his playing career after 15 seasons in the same round he made his debut. Simpson played every game during the North Melbourne 1996 and 1999 premiership seasons, and during his career he missed seven games as a regular player. He was the third player to notch 300 games for North Melbourne.

Simpson played for North Melbourne Football Club from 1995 until 2009 for a total of 306 games and kicked 83 goals. Simpson was also a member of North Melbourne Premiership teams in 1996 and 1999.

== Coaching career ==
=== Hawthorn Football Club assistant coach (2010-2013) ===
After his retirement from his playing career at the end of the 2009 season, Simpson began his coaching career as an assistant coach under senior coach Alastair Clarkson at Hawthorn in the 2010 AFL season, and he was the midfield & forward coach for the Hawks when the club won the premiership in the 2013 AFL Grand Final.

=== West Coast Eagles senior coach (2014-2024) ===
In October 2013, the West Coast Eagles appointed Simpson as senior coach for the 2014 season. He replaced John Worsfold who stood down after a disappointing 2013 season. Simpson was selected ahead of applicants Scott Burns, Leigh Tudor and Peter Sumich. In his first year as senior coach, the Eagles under Simpson finished 9th at the end of the 2014 AFL season, just missing out of the finals. The following year in the 2015 AFL season, Simpson and the Eagles surprised many commentators by their performance when the club finished 2nd at the end home & away rounds. Simpson then coached the West Coast Eagles to the 2015 AFL Grand Final, which they fell short and lost to Hawthorn by a margin of 46 points with the final score Hawthorn 16.11 (107) to West Coast Eagles 8.13 (61).

In the following two seasons the Eagles made the finals, bowing out in the elimination final and the semi-final in 2016 and 2017 respectively.

In Round 2, 2018 against Western Bulldogs at Docklands Stadium, West Coast Eagles forwards coach Jaymie Graham served as caretaker coach of the team after Simpson was forced to return to Perth due to a family health drama.

In the 2018 AFL season, Simpson coached the West Coast Eagles to a premiership in the 2018 AFL Grand Final, when West Coast Eagles defeated Collingwood by a margin of five points, with the final score West Coast Eagles 11.13 (79) to Collingwood 11.8 (74).

After three consecutive years without making the finals, including one 'horror' season in 2023, where West Coast Eagles finished last on the ladder, on July 9th, 2024, in the middle of the 2024 season, after Round 17, 2024, with no improvement in on-field performance with the Eagles sitting at sixteenth (third-last) on the ladder, Simpson stood down as senior coach of the West Coast Eagles in a mutual agreement with the club that Simpson's 11-year tenure as senior coach would come to an end, effective immediately. Simpson was replaced by assistant coach Jarrad Schofield as caretaker senior coach for the remainder of the 2024 season.

=== Carlton Football Club (2026-present) ===
Simpson has served a part-time role at the Carlton Football Club from 2026. Simpson is the Director of Coaching and was an advisor to former senior coach Michael Voss.

== Statistics ==
=== Playing statistics ===
Legend
G	Goals	K	Kicks	D	Disposals	T	Tackles
B	Behinds	H	Handballs	M	Marks

Season	Team	No.	Games	Totals							Averages (per game)							Votes
Season	Team	No.	Games	G	B	K	H	D	M	T	G	B	K	H	D	M	T	Votes
1995	North Melbourne	37	2	0	0	5	6	11	1	1	0.0	0.0	2.5	3.0	5.5	0.5	0.5	0
1996	North Melbourne	37	25	16	8	164	94	258	46	35	0.6	0.3	6.6	3.8	10.3	1.8	1.4	0
1997	North Melbourne	37	19	5	7	153	82	235	46	23	0.3	0.4	8.1	4.3	12.4	2.4	1.2	0
1998	North Melbourne	37	19	9	10	175	112	287	46	45	0.5	0.5	9.2	5.9	15.1	2.4	2.4	0
1999	Kangaroos	7	25	5	9	409	136	545	113	54	0.2	0.4	16.4	5.4	21.8	4.5	2.2	7
2000	Kangaroos	7	25	5	6	376	116	492	87	83	0.2	0.2	15.0	4.6	19.7	3.5	3.3	0
2001	Kangaroos	7	21	3	0	309	146	455	88	60	0.1	0.0	14.7	7.0	21.7	4.2	2.9	2
2002	Kangaroos	7	23	7	10	403	162	565	105	72	0.3	0.4	17.5	7.0	24.6	4.6	3.1	7
2003	Kangaroos	7	21	11	6	327	205	532	126	45	0.5	0.3	15.6	9.8	25.3	6.0	2.1	9
2004	Kangaroos	7	22	4	8	317	227	544	118	73	0.2	0.4	14.4	10.3	24.7	5.4	3.3	10
2005	Kangaroos	7	21	3	1	230	183	413	84	63	0.1	0.0	11.0	8.7	19.7	4.0	3.0	7
2006	Kangaroos	7	19	2	2	226	210	436	96	58	0.1	0.1	11.9	11.1	22.9	5.1	3.1	3
2007	Kangaroos	7	25	4	4	327	283	610	104	110	0.2	0.2	13.1	11.3	24.4	4.2	4.4	13
2008	North Melbourne	7	21	4	5	238	267	505	77	77	0.2	0.2	11.3	12.7	24.0	3.7	3.7	7
2009	North Melbourne	7	18	5	4	199	243	442	95	76	0.3	0.2	11.1	13.5	24.6	5.3	4.2	7
Career			306	83	80	3858	2472	6330	1232	875	0.3	0.3	12.6	8.1	20.7	4.0	2.9	72

=== Coaching statistics ===
Team	Year	Regular season					Finals			
Team	Year	Won	Lost	Ties	Win %	Finish	Won	Lost	Win %	Result
WCE	2014	11	11	0	.500	9th (out of 18)	—	—	—	—
WCE	2015	16	5	1	.750	2nd (out of 18)	2	1	.667	Lost 2015 AFL Grand Final
WCE	2016	16	6	0	.727	6th (out of 18)	0	1	.000	Lost Elimination Final
WCE	2017	12	10	0	.545	8th (out of 18)	1	1	.500	Lost Semi Final
WCE	2018	15	6	0	.714	2nd (out of 18)	3	0	1.000	Won 2018 AFL Grand Final
WCE	2019	15	7	0	.682	5th (out of 18)	1	1	.500	Lost Semi Final
WCE	2020 (Note: The 2020 season was played with 17 home-and-away matches per team (down from 22) and 16-minute quarters with time on (down from 20-minute quarters with time on) due to the impact of the COVID-19 pandemic.)	12	5	0	.706	5th (out of 18)	0	1	.000	Lost Elimination Final
WCE	2021	10	12	0	.455	9th (out of 18)	—	—	—	—
WCE	2022	2	20	0	.091	17th (out of 18)	—	—	—	—
WCE	2023	3	20	0	.130	18th (out of 18)	—	—	—	—
WCE	2024	3	13	0	.186	16th (out of 18)	—	—	—	Resigned after round 18.
Total		123	119	1	.573		7	5	.583	

== Honours and achievements ==
=== Playing honours ===
Team

- AFL Premiership (North Melbourne): 1996, 1999
- McClelland Trophy (North Melbourne): 1998
- Pre-Season Cup Winner (North Melbourne): 1995, 1998

Individual

- All-Australian: 2002
- Syd Barker Medal: 2002
- North Melbourne F.C. Captain: 2004–2008
- International Rules Team: 2002, 2003
- AFL Rising Star Nominee:1996

=== Coaching honours ===
Team

- AFL Premiership (West Coast): 2018

Individual

- Jock McHale Medal: 2018
- All-Australian: 2018

== Personal life ==
Simpson married his high-school sweetheart, whom he met in Year 11, and he has four children.
