= Corey McKernan =

Australian rules footballer (born 1973)

Personal information
- Born: 19 December 1973 (age 52)
- Original team: Westmeadows
- Debut: Round 17, 1993, North Melbourne vs. St Kilda, at the MCG
- Height: 197 cm (6 ft 6 in)
- Weight: 108 kg (238 lb)

Playing career^{1}
Years	Club	Games (Goals)
1993–2001	North Melbourne	182 (233)
2002–2003	Carlton	41 (60)
2004	North Melbourne	14 (17)
Total		237 (310)
- ^{1} Playing statistics correct to the end of 2004.

Career highlights
- AFL Premiership: 1996, 1999; AFLPA MVP (Leigh Matthews Trophy): 1996; All-Australian team: 1996; Carlton Best and Fairest: 2002; Carlton leading goal kicker: 2002; AFL Rising Star nominee: 1994

Corey McKernan (born 19 December 1973) is a former Australian rules footballer who played for the North Melbourne Kangaroos and Carlton Blues in the Australian Football League (AFL). A dual Premiership player, a one-time All-Australian at North Melbourne, and a one-time club best and fairest winner and leading goalkicker at Carlton, McKernan was at one time considered to be one of the very best players in the country. He is the older brother to Shaun McKernan, who played with Adelaide Crows, Essendon, and St Kilda.

== Early years ==
McKernan grew up in Melbourne's western suburbs and was recruited to North Melbourne from Westmeadows Football Club in the Essendon District Football League as a 197 cm, 105 kg mobile ruckman, prior to the 1993 AFL season. In his first season at AFL level, he played just one game, a loss to St Kilda in Round 17.

== North Melbourne ==
=== 1994 ===
The following year, 1994, McKernan had an impressive start to his AFL Career, after being elevated by coach Denis Pagan to the starting line-up. He quickly gained a reputation as a mobile and agile ruckman who was a strong overhead mark and a potent part-time forward. At the end of the season, he polled the most votes in the Norwich Rising Star award, but he was ineligible to win the award due to a suspension he received earlier in the year, a fact that would be echoed two years later in the 1996 Brownlow Medal count.

=== 1996 ===
After another solid season in 1995 in which he continued to improve, McKernan took his game to a new level in 1996. Alternating between the ruck and forward line, McKernan was dominant, often turning games with his high leap, ability to regularly take contested marks, and long kicking. Not to be overshadowed by his superstar captain Wayne Carey, at season's end the AFL Players Association awarded him with the Most Valuable Player award (now known as the Leigh Matthews Trophy). Disappointingly for McKernan, he polled the then equal-most votes in the game's highest individual honour, the Brownlow Medal, but was ineligible to win the medal due to an earlier suspension that season. North Melbourne went on to win the 1996 AFL Premiership, with McKernan typically magnificent in the Grand Final against Sydney, recording a career-high 29 disposals in the grand final. To add to his list of honours, McKernan was named as the first ruck in the All-Australian team, and some experts had him ahead of teammate Carey as the best player in the league.

=== 1997 to 1999 ===
In Round 1 of 1997, Wayne Carey was seriously injured and missed the following 11 weeks. With Carey absent, McKernan in just his fourth full season, became the most important player at the club. Though still consistent and effective, he could not repeat his inspirational efforts of the previous year. In North Melbourne's Preliminary Final defeat against St Kilda, McKernan dislocated his shoulder in the opening minutes and watched from the sidelines as his team went down by 31 points. The following year was disappointing for both McKernan and the Kangaroos; however, 1999 became another premiership year for North Melbourne, as McKernan returned to some good form, leading the team in marks and kicking 34 goals from his 24 games. He finished the season with three goals in North Melbourne's 39-point Grand Final win over Carlton.

=== 2000 and 2001 ===
Later in his career, McKernan became more of a forward and backup ruckman, while Matthew Burton accepted most of the ruck duties for the Kangaroos. However, McKernan still finished second in the Kangaroos' goalkicking in both 2000 and 2001, with 40 and 38 goals, respectively. He kicked a career-high eight goals against Geelong in Round 19 of 2000—a game in which he also claimed eight marks, 23 disposals, and 11 hit-outs.

== Carlton ==
In 2002, McKernan was traded to Carlton, where he played the next two seasons. His first season at Carlton was amongst his best since 1996. He led the Blues in hit-outs and goals, and he claimed his first and only club best and fairest award.

== Back to North Melbourne ==
After a disappointing 2003 at Carlton, McKernan returned to the Kangaroos for one last season in 2004, after which he retired due to injury and poor form.

== Playing statistics ==
Legend
G	Goals	K	Kicks	D	Disposals	T	Tackles
B	Behinds	H	Handballs	M	Marks	H/O	Hit-outs

Season	Team	No.	Games	Totals								Averages (per game)							
Season	Team	No.	Games	G	B	K	H	D	M	T	H/O	G	B	K	H	D	M	T	H/O
1993	North Melbourne	31	1	0	0	5	1	6	1	2	3	0.0	0.0	5.0	1.0	6.0	1.0	2.0	3.0
1994	North Melbourne	31	21	22	19	181	113	294	110	12	183	1.0	0.9	8.6	5.4	14.0	5.2	0.6	8.7
1995	North Melbourne	31	25	19	14	202	130	332	116	6	198	0.8	0.6	8.1	5.2	13.3	4.6	0.2	7.9
1996	North Melbourne	31	24	33	30	312	111	423	154	17	284	1.4	1.3	13.0	4.6	17.6	6.4	0.7	11.8
1997	North Melbourne	31	22	22	14	237	79	316	134	13	143	1.0	0.6	10.8	3.6	14.4	6.1	0.6	6.5
1998	North Melbourne	31	21	25	15	185	72	257	91	18	240	1.2	0.7	8.8	3.4	12.2	4.3	0.9	11.4
1999	Kangaroos	31	24	34	22	253	98	351	151	14	324	1.4	0.9	10.5	4.1	14.6	6.3	0.6	13.5
2000	Kangaroos	31	23	40	22	231	80	311	135	15	150	1.7	1.0	10.0	3.5	13.5	5.9	0.7	6.5
2001	Kangaroos	31	21	38	15	160	52	212	99	11	98	1.8	0.7	7.6	2.5	10.1	4.7	0.5	4.7
2002	Carlton	2	22	40	26	170	69	239	94	27	214	1.8	1.2	7.7	3.1	10.9	4.3	1.2	9.7
2003	Carlton	2	19	20	16	110	44	154	61	12	163	1.1	0.8	5.8	2.3	8.1	3.2	0.6	8.6
2004	Kangaroos	5	14	17	9	89	28	117	55	23	146	1.2	0.6	6.4	2.0	8.4	3.9	1.6	10.4
2005	Kangaroos	5	0	0	0	0	0	0	0	0	0	0.0	0.0	0.0	0.0	0.0	0.0	0.0	0.0
Career			237	310	202	2135	877	3012	1201	170	2146	1.3	0.9	9.0	3.7	12.7	5.1	0.7	9.1
