= Glenn Archer =

Australian rules footballer, born 1973

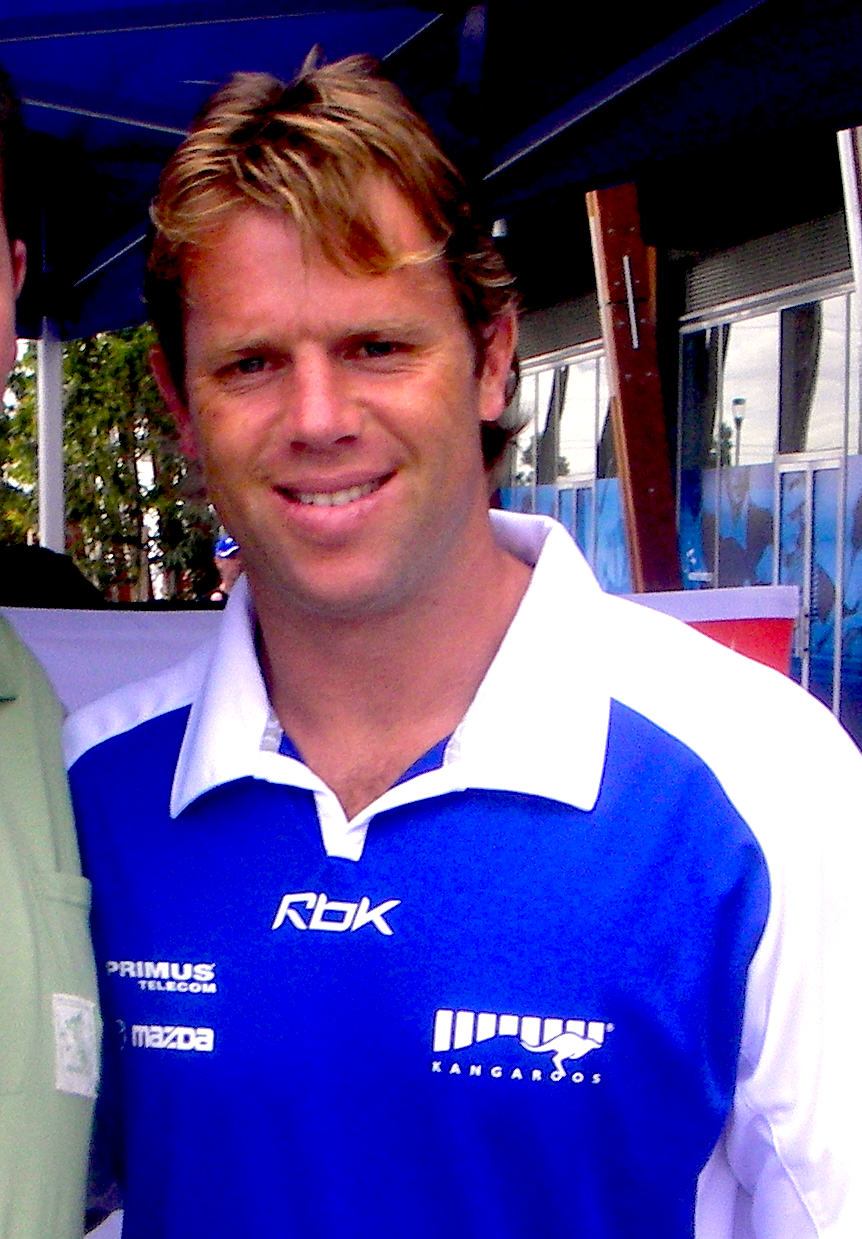
- Archer in 2006

Personal information
- Full name: Glenn Archer
- Nickname: Arch
- Born: 24 March 1973 (age 53); Victoria, Australia
- Original team: Noble Park
- Height: 182 cm (6 ft 0 in)
- Weight: 91 kg (201 lb)
- Position: Defender

Playing career^{1}
Years	Club	Games (Goals)
1992–2007	North Melbourne	311 (148)

Representative team honours
Years	Team	Games (Goals)
1996–1998	Victoria	3 (?)
- ^{1} Playing statistics correct to the end of 2007.

Career highlights
- 2× AFL premiership player: 1996, 1999; 3× All-Australian team: 1996, 1998, 2002; Norm Smith Medal: 1996; 6× Robert Rose Award: 1998–1999, 2002–2003, 2005–2006; Madden Medal: 2007; North Melbourne Team of the Century; AFL Rising Star nominee: 1993; Shinboner of the Century

Glenn Archer (born 24 March 1973) is a former professional Australian rules footballer who played his entire career with the North Melbourne Football Club.

Archer had a reputation as one of the most courageous players ever to play the game. The AFL Players Association awarded him the Robert Rose Award for Most Courageous Player six times in nine years between 1998 and 2006, the most of any player in the award's history. In recognition as one of the best players in the AFL, Archer achieved All-Australian selection three times and also represented Victoria in State of Origin.

Archer is a former North Melbourne Football Club player, a dual-premiership and Norm Smith Medallist, he holds the third most games record for North Melbourne, is a member of the North Melbourne Team of the Century and is recognised with the title the "Shinboner of the Century" as the North Melbourne player who most embodies the Shinboner spirit.

== Early life ==
He supported the Collingwood Football Club. He played senior football with the Noble Park Football Club. Then lightly framed but hard at the ball Archer trialled with North Melbourne's under 19s; however, he was not a standout performer. Although the Carlton Football Club had some interest in recruiting him, North Melbourne rookie listed him as a long term prospect. He attended Carwatha College, Noble Park (Melbourne, VIC).

== Football career ==
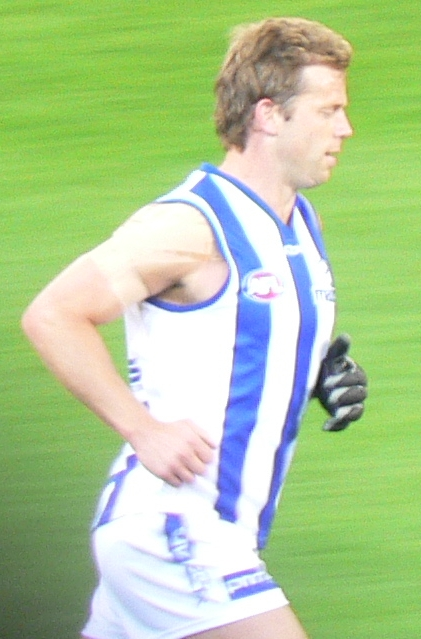
Archer playing for North Melbourne during the 2007 AFL Season

Debuting in 1992, Archer was an inconsistent and undersized player.

=== Breakout season – 1996 ===
Continuous work on his 182 cm frame resulted in a weight increase to 94 kilograms in 1996, and led to his becoming a more notable on-field presence and a more consistent performer.

In 1996, Archer was offered a lucrative 3-year contract worth $450,000 over three years from the Sydney Swans, which he turned down. The man behind the deal, Ron Joseph, is now "Arch's" manager.

Also in 1996, he won All-Australian selection, and was named best on ground in the Kangaroos 1996 premiership team, winning the Norm Smith Medal. Although Archer was part of the losing Grand Final squad to Adelaide in 1998, Archer tasted premiership success once more in 1999. Amongst winning other awards from his club and the AFL, Archer was voted "Shinboner of the Century" by North Melbourne in 2005 (Shinboners being a nickname the North Melbourne Football Club).

=== 2007 season and retirement ===
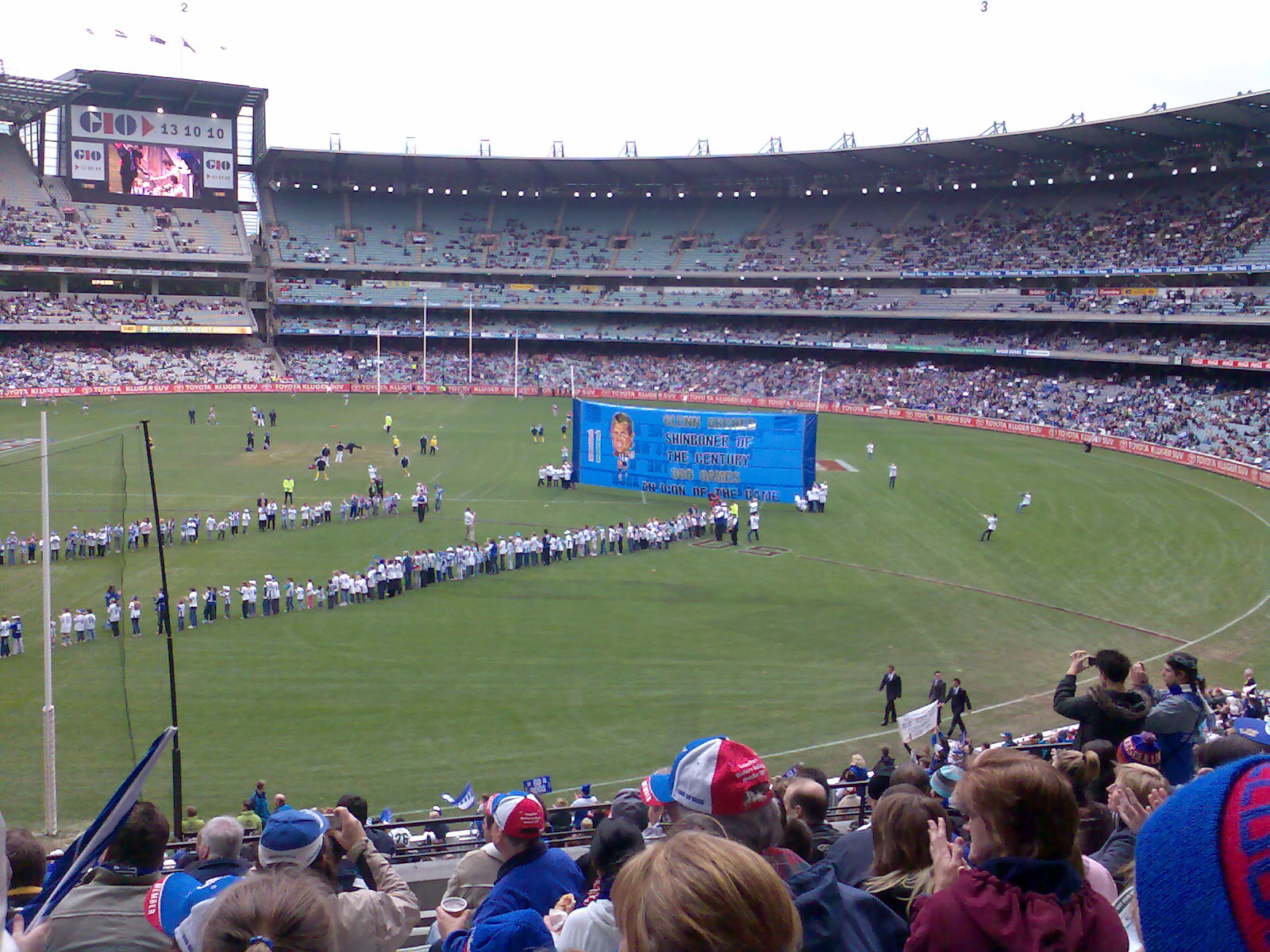
300 children lined up in a Guard of Honour for Glenn Archer's 300th career game in 2007.

2007 had several developments for Glen Archer. The North Melbourne Football Club saw newfound success in part due to an influx of youth and the maturation of a number of second-tier players. Archer had a renaissance of his own performance as a player, with notable outings on a number of occasions.

During Round 13, against the Western Bulldogs, Archer celebrated his AFL milestone 300th game with another excellent performance. At this game, 300 kids lined up to create a 'Guard of Honour' for the champion in respect for his career so far and 300th game.

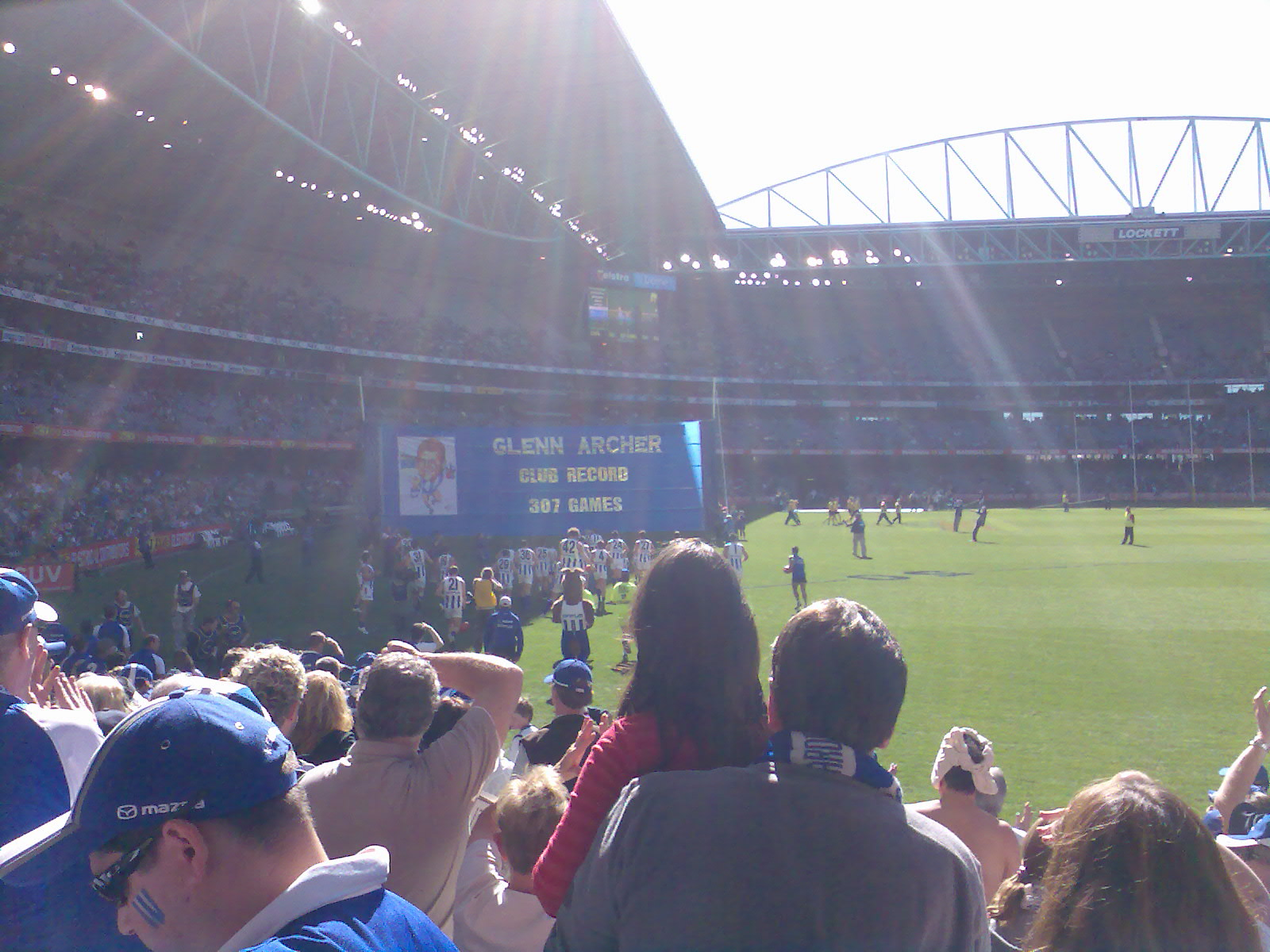
The banner at Archer's record breaking game against Carlton ("Glenn Archer / Club Record / 307 Games")

On Saturday 25 August 2007 in a game against Carlton at Telstra Dome, Archer passed Wayne Schimmelbusch as the Kangaroos' games record-holder, playing his 307th in a career that began during Schimmelbusch's final year as coach in 1992. When asked about the record, Archer commented: "Schimma's a legend of our club and of the AFL, and when I walked into the club 17 years ago and saw Wayne Schimmelbusch's name up on the wall with 306 games, I never thought I'd come anywhere near that. It's certainly a bit surreal for me". Archer's eventual tally of 311 games was surpassed by the current record-holder Brent Harvey in Round 12, 2011.

Archer was inducted into the Australian Football Hall of Fame on 13 June 2012.

== Post-AFL career ==
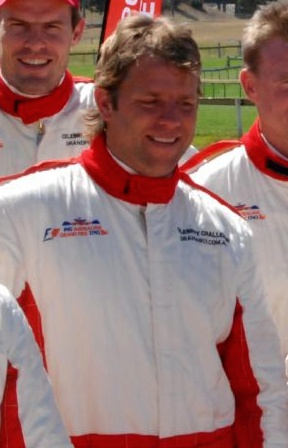
Archer as a celebrity racer at an event prior to the 2008 Australian Grand Prix.

Archer owns his own business with a former AFL player and North Melbourne teammate, Leigh Colbert, called Kode Entertainment Group. As of 2023, he runs a tree-removalist business.

Archer is currently a director of Stride Sports Management.

He and former Kangaroos teammate Anthony Stevens played a match for the Caulfield Grammarians Football Club.

Before season 2008, the Archer–Hird Medal was created honouring Archer and former Essendon Football Club star James Hird. Since 2008, the medal has been awarded to the player showing the most determination, courage and skill in matches between the Kangaroos and the Bombers.

Archer played for the Warrandyte Football Club in the 3rd division of the Victorian Eastern Football League in the 2010 season.

Archer is an Executive Producer on the Australian film Blinder, released in 2013. Shot around Torquay, Victoria, the film is about a legendary former local footballer Tom Dunn of the Torquay Tigers. Once embroiled in a major club scandal, Dunn returns home after ten years away, to clear his name and pull the club back together.

Archer's son, Jackson, was drafted with a father–son selection at the 2021 AFL draft by North Melbourne. He made his debut in Round 15 against the Adelaide Crows in 2022.

== Legal Issues ==
In June 2017, Archer was charged by police with unlawful assault after attacking a 47-year-old runner who reportedly had been abusing him. The incident took place at an oval in Heidelberg, Victoria where Archer was watching his son play in a junior football game. Archer denied having had assaulted the man and said he had left before police had arrived. Police had stated that the victim suffered minor injuries but didn't require any treatment. In a statement by the North Melbourne Football Club the next day, Archer said "I would like to apologise unreservedly for my involvement in what transpired at a junior football match in Heidelberg on Sunday." He was required to appear at Heidelberg Magistrates' Court on 1 September 2017, having been charged by police with assault.

At the court case, Archer was convicted and fined $2,000 in addition to paying $955 restitution for his victim's glasses, although the magistrate denied him the opportunity to tell his story.

At the appeal hearing on 18 February 2019, the judge annulled the conviction, replaced the $2,000 fine with a request to donate $2,000 to a children's charity, and placed Archer on a 12-month good-behavior bond. Restitution remained at $955.

In 2023, Archer is set to face charges of dangerous driving after hitting a cyclist while driving a tow truck. The incident occurred on Rosanna Road in the Melbourne suburb of Heidelberg, and the cyclist in question was hospitalized after the incident. Archer faced the Magistrates Court in July 2023 and was convicted on a single charge of reckless driving and fined $1,500. His driver's licence was not revoked.

== Statistics ==
Legend
G	Goals	K	Kicks	D	Disposals	T	Tackles
B	Behinds	H	Handballs	M	Marks
#	Played in that season's premiership team

Season	Team	No.	Games	Totals							Averages (per game)							Votes
Season	Team	No.	Games	G	B	K	H	D	M	T	G	B	K	H	D	M	T	Votes
1992	North Melbourne	11	9	1	0	60	13	73	20	10	0.1	0.0	6.7	1.4	8.1	2.2	1.1	0
1993	North Melbourne	11	20	11	4	160	81	241	78	36	0.6	0.2	8.0	4.1	12.1	3.9	1.8	1
1994	North Melbourne	11	21	3	5	142	124	266	55	30	0.1	0.2	6.8	5.9	12.7	2.6	1.4	3
1995	North Melbourne	11	22	28	8	174	110	284	62	41	1.3	0.4	7.9	5.0	12.9	2.8	1.9	1
1996^{#}	North Melbourne	11	24	24	11	226	107	333	98	42	1.0	0.5	9.4	4.5	13.9	4.1	1.8	5
1997	North Melbourne	11	21	15	12	173	89	262	80	26	0.7	0.6	8.2	4.2	12.5	3.8	1.2	4
1998	North Melbourne	11	22	6	6	217	70	287	93	30	0.3	0.3	9.9	3.2	13.0	4.2	1.4	9
1999^{#}	Kangaroos	11	23	14	8	241	78	319	99	34	0.6	0.3	10.5	3.4	13.9	4.3	1.5	0
2000	Kangaroos	11	17	6	2	197	52	249	85	29	0.4	0.1	11.6	3.1	14.6	5.0	1.7	0
2001	Kangaroos	11	20	5	3	192	80	272	71	54	0.3	0.2	9.6	4.0	13.6	3.6	2.7	7
2002	Kangaroos	11	22	8	7	210	70	280	95	54	0.4	0.3	9.5	3.2	12.7	4.3	2.5	5
2003	Kangaroos	11	17	10	5	145	59	204	62	29	0.6	0.3	8.5	3.5	12.0	3.6	1.7	0
2004	Kangaroos	11	14	0	0	107	27	134	46	21	0.0	0.0	7.6	1.9	9.6	3.3	1.5	0
2005	Kangaroos	11	22	7	2	277	77	354	104	61	0.3	0.1	12.6	3.5	16.1	4.7	2.8	2
2006	Kangaroos	11	15	1	1	176	39	215	87	35	0.1	0.1	11.7	2.6	14.3	5.8	2.3	0
2007	Kangaroos	11	22	4	4	238	76	314	102	42	0.2	0.2	10.8	3.5	14.3	4.6	1.9	1
Career			311	143	78	2935	1152	4087	1237	574	0.5	0.3	9.4	3.7	13.1	4.0	1.8	38

== Honours and achievements ==
Team

- 2× AFL premiership player (North Melbourne/Kangaroos): 1996, 1999
- McClelland Trophy (North Melbourne): 1998

Individual

- Shinboner of the Century – Nominated 2005
- Norm Smith Medal: 1996
- 6× Robert Rose Award – AFLPA most courageous player: 1998, 1999, 2002, 2003, 2005, 2006 (shared with Brett Kirk)
- 3× All-Australian team: 1996, 1998, 2002
- 3× State of Origin (Victoria): 1996, 1997, 1998
- AFLPA Madden Medal: 2007
- North Melbourne Team of the Century (Selected in 2001) – Back Pocket
- Australian Football Hall of Fame – 2012 Inductee
- AFL Rising Star nominee: 1993 (Round 12)
