= Mick Martyn (Australian footballer) =

Australian rules footballer

Personal information
- Full name: Michael Martyn
- Born: 31 August 1968 (age 58)
- Original team: Newport Central
- Height: 190 cm (6 ft 3 in)
- Weight: 105 kg (231 lb)
- Position: Defender

Playing career^{1}
Years	Club	Games (Goals)
1988–2002	North Melbourne	287 (16)
2003	Carlton	13 (0)
Total		300 (16)
- ^{1} Playing statistics correct to the end of 2003.

Career highlights
- 2× AFL premiership player: 1996, 1999; 2x Syd Barker Medal 1989, 1991; 2x North Melbourne pre-season premiership teams 1995, 1998; Michael Tuck Medal 1995

Michael Martyn (born 31 August 1968) is a former Australian rules footballer who played for North Melbourne and Carlton in the Australian Football League (AFL). He is the son of Bryan Martyn, who also played for North Melbourne, and is a relative of early Carlton champion Paddy O'Brien. He is an AFL life member.

After retiring from the AFL Mick played a season with Spotswood in the W.R.F.L.

== Early life ==
Martyn was born with a cleft palate disorder which does not allow him to speak normally or fluently. He attended St. Paul's College in North Altona.

== North Melbourne Football Club ==
Martyn was drafted to the Kangaroos under the father–son rule. He notched up his first league game against Geelong but did not come on until the third quarter, where he lined up on Gary Ablett Sr. In 1995, he was awarded the Michael Tuck Medal after the Kangaroos beat the Adelaide Crows in the 1995 Ansett Cup. In 2002, he gained permission by the AFL to wear his father's number 30 jumper, as it would be the last match his father ever witnessed before dying a few days later. Mick said, "I didn't want to do it (wear Bryan's number) after he died. It was the greatest night of my life. It was better than winning a premiership. I wore two jumpers because I wanted to send one down with him, down the grave." Martyn won two premierships with the Kangaroos in 1996 and 1999 until he was delisted by the Kangaroos at the end of the 2002 season.

== Bali bombings ==
Martyn was injured in the 2002 Bali bombings, where he received burns to the back of his scalp. He had been drinking with Jason McCartney at Paddy's bar at the time of the attack. After exiting the building, he and McCartney left the scene and were admitted to hospital, McCartney suffering more life-threatening injuries. Martyn caused some controversy in 2004, commenting on radio station Triple M that after the Bali bombings "it wasn't the blue and white in my corner; it was the navy blue".

== Carlton Football Club ==
At the 2002 draft, with Denis Pagan needing a "gorilla" at full-back, Martyn was drafted by Carlton to play for the 2003 season. He played a handful of games to notch up his 300th match against Essendon in Round 18 2003 at the MCG, where Carlton lost by 34 points; after the match, he was chaired off the ground. However, that turned out to be his last match; he announced his retirement after the serious knee injury he suffered the next week at training.

== Playing statistics ==
Legend
G	Goals	K	Kicks	D	Disposals	T	Tackles
B	Behinds	H	Handballs	M	Marks

Season	Team	No.	Games	Totals							Averages (per game)						
Season	Team	No.	Games	G	B	K	H	D	M	T	G	B	K	H	D	M	T
1988	North Melbourne	50	21	1	0	205	51	256	55	24	0.0	0.0	9.8	2.4	12.2	2.6	1.1
1989	North Melbourne	4	18	3	4	224	75	299	57	13	0.2	0.2	12.4	4.2	16.6	3.2	0.7
1990	North Melbourne	4	15	0	0	114	38	152	27	11	0.0	0.0	7.6	2.5	10.1	1.8	0.7
1991	North Melbourne	4	22	1	0	209	84	293	75	12	0.0	0.0	9.5	3.8	13.3	3.4	0.5
1992	North Melbourne	4	18	5	6	124	81	205	47	15	0.3	0.3	6.9	4.5	11.4	2.6	0.8
1993	North Melbourne	4	19	1	0	136	54	190	40	11	0.1	0.0	7.2	2.8	10.0	2.1	0.6
1994	North Melbourne	4	21	0	0	116	72	188	42	7	0.0	0.0	5.5	3.4	9.0	2.0	0.3
1995	North Melbourne	4	17	2	1	87	91	178	35	6	0.1	0.1	5.1	5.4	10.5	2.1	0.4
1996	North Melbourne	4	25	1	1	155	111	266	67	14	0.0	0.0	6.2	4.4	10.6	2.7	0.6
1997	North Melbourne	4	25	0	0	201	66	267	62	19	0.0	0.0	8.0	2.6	10.7	2.5	0.8
1998	North Melbourne	4	20	0	0	150	58	208	51	11	0.0	0.0	7.5	2.9	10.4	2.6	0.6
1999	Kangaroos	4	21	0	0	153	76	229	54	16	0.0	0.0	7.3	3.6	10.9	2.6	0.8
2000	Kangaroos	4	15	1	0	101	42	143	43	7	0.1	0.0	6.7	2.8	9.5	2.9	0.5
2001	Kangaroos	4	11	0	1	73	33	106	25	11	0.0	0.1	6.6	3.0	9.6	2.3	1.0
2002	Kangaroos	4/30	19	1	1	111	42	153	36	14	0.1	0.1	5.8	2.2	8.1	1.9	0.7
2003	Carlton	10	13	0	0	52	34	86	22	8	0.0	0.0	4.0	2.6	6.6	1.7	0.6
Career			300	16	14	2211	1008	3219	738	199	0.1	0.0	7.4	3.4	10.7	2.5	0.7
