= Craig Sholl =

Australian rules footballer

Personal information
- Born: 30 December 1967 (age 58)
- Original team: Horsham
- Height: 189 cm (6 ft 2 in)
- Weight: 91 kg (201 lb)

Playing career^{1}
| Years | Club | Games (Goals) |
| 1987–2000 | North Melbourne | 235 (165) |
- ^{1} Playing statistics correct to the end of 2000.

Career highlights
- Wimmera FL Reserves best & fairest: 1985; Syd Barker Medal: 1991; Victorian State Representative Team: 1991, 1992, 1993 & 1994; North Melbourne Premiership side: 1996 & 1999; Goulburn Valley FL best & fairest/Morrison Medal: 2001; Goulburn Valley FL Premiership Side - Echuca FNC: 2001 & 2002

Craig Sholl (born 30 December 1967) is a former Australian Rules footballer who played for Essendon Under 19's in 1986, then with the North Melbourne Kangaroos from 1987 onwards.

He won a premiership with the club in 1996 and the Syd Barker Medal in 1991, which he drew with Mick Martyn.

Sholl played his 200th game for the Kangaroos in the 1998 Grand Final which they lost to the Adelaide Crows.

Sholl played in the 1999 Grand Final against Carlton, kicking an early goal and assisting another.

His final game was the 2000 preliminary final against Melbourne in which he kicked seven goals.

== Playing statistics ==
Legend
| G | Goals | K | Kicks | D | Disposals | T | Tackles |
| B | Behinds | H | Handballs | M | Marks |

| Season | Team | No. | Games | Totals | | | | | | | Averages (per game) | | | | | | |
| Season | Team | No. | Games | G | B | K | H | D | M | T | G | B | K | H | D | M | T |
|---|---|---|---|---|---|---|---|---|---|---|---|---|---|---|---|---|---|
| 1987 | North Melbourne | 51 | 4 | 0 | 1 | 26 | 13 | 39 | 8 | 4 | 0.0 | 0.3 | 6.5 | 3.3 | 9.8 | 2.0 | 1.0 |
| 1988 | North Melbourne | 51 | 0 | — | — | — | — | — | — | — | — | — | — | — | — | — | — |
| 1989 | North Melbourne | 41 | 4 | 0 | 1 | 26 | 13 | 39 | 8 | 4 | 0.0 | 0.3 | 6.5 | 3.3 | 9.8 | 2.0 | 1.0 |
| 1990 | North Melbourne | 24 | 13 | 4 | 3 | 165 | 52 | 217 | 33 | 33 | 0.3 | 0.2 | 12.7 | 4.0 | 16.7 | 2.5 | 2.5 |
| 1991 | North Melbourne | 24 | 22 | 4 | 5 | 275 | 116 | 391 | 86 | 46 | 0.2 | 0.2 | 12.5 | 5.3 | 17.8 | 3.9 | 2.1 |
| 1992 | North Melbourne | 24 | 21 | 4 | 2 | 278 | 144 | 422 | 69 | 45 | 0.2 | 0.1 | 13.2 | 6.9 | 20.1 | 3.3 | 2.1 |
| 1993 | North Melbourne | 24 | 21 | 4 | 8 | 243 | 95 | 338 | 58 | 34 | 0.2 | 0.4 | 11.6 | 4.5 | 16.1 | 2.8 | 1.6 |
| 1994 | North Melbourne | 24 | 24 | 4 | 6 | 290 | 109 | 399 | 84 | 32 | 0.2 | 0.3 | 12.1 | 4.5 | 16.6 | 3.5 | 1.3 |
| 1995 | North Melbourne | 24 | 19 | 1 | 3 | 163 | 80 | 243 | 37 | 15 | 0.1 | 0.2 | 8.6 | 4.2 | 12.8 | 1.9 | 0.8 |
| 1996 | North Melbourne | 24 | 23 | 35 | 23 | 223 | 109 | 332 | 84 | 48 | 1.5 | 1.0 | 9.7 | 4.7 | 14.4 | 3.7 | 2.1 |
| 1997 | North Melbourne | 24 | 25 | 40 | 34 | 201 | 113 | 314 | 122 | 40 | 1.6 | 1.4 | 8.0 | 4.5 | 12.6 | 4.9 | 1.6 |
| 1998 | North Melbourne | 24 | 24 | 24 | 28 | 182 | 84 | 266 | 76 | 53 | 1.0 | 1.2 | 7.6 | 3.5 | 11.1 | 3.2 | 2.2 |
| 1999 | Kangaroos | 24 | 22 | 30 | 15 | 159 | 68 | 227 | 70 | 29 | 1.4 | 0.7 | 7.2 | 3.1 | 10.3 | 3.2 | 1.3 |
| 2000 | Kangaroos | 24 | 13 | 15 | 13 | 67 | 30 | 97 | 37 | 15 | 1.2 | 1.0 | 5.2 | 2.3 | 7.5 | 2.8 | 1.2 |
| Career | | | 235 | 165 | 142 | 2298 | 1026 | 3324 | 772 | 398 | 0.7 | 0.6 | 9.8 | 4.4 | 14.1 | 3.3 | 1.7 |
