= List of North Melbourne Football Club individual awards and records =

This is a list of individual awards achieved by the North Melbourne Football Club since its foundation in 1869.

== V/AFL Individual honours ==
=== Tassie Medal ===
- 1958 – Allen James Aylett

=== Norm Smith Medal ===
- 1996 – Glenn Archer
- 1999 – Shannon Grant

=== Brownlow Medal ===
- 1965 – Noel Teasdale
- 1973 – Keith Greig
- 1974 – Keith Greig
- 1978 – Malcolm Blight
- 1983 – Ross Glendinning

=== Michael Tuck Medal ===
- 1995 – Mick Martyn
- 1998 – Wayne Carey

=== EJ Whitten Medal ===
- 1999 – Brent Harvey

=== Graham Moss Medal ===
- 1998 – Peter Bell

=== Simpson Medal ===
- 1960 – Allen Aylett

=== Jim Stynes Medal ===
- 2003 – Brent Harvey

=== Lou Richards Medal ===
- 2007 – Brent Harvey
- 2008 – Brent Harvey

=== Leigh Matthews Trophy ===
- 1995 – Wayne Carey
- 1996 – Corey McKernan
- 1998 – Wayne Carey

=== Jock McHale Medal ===
- 1975 – Ron Barassi
- 1977 – Ron Barassi
- 1996 – Denis Pagan
- 1999 – Denis Pagan

=== Gardiner Medal ===
- 1932 – George Franke
- 1945 – Harold Arthur
- 1951 – Neil Doolan
- 1961 – Jock O'Brien
- 1970 – Michael Redenbach
- 1977 – Darryl Schimmelbusch
- 1996 – Trent Nichols

=== Morrish Medal ===
- 1950 – Noel Alford
- 1958 – Norman Bowler
- 1964 – Peter Gowans
- 1972 – Ian Kilmartin
- 1978 – Stephen Simpson
- 1984 – Tony Liberatore
- 1986 – David Ross
- 1987 – Wayne Schwass
- 1988 – Tim McGrath
- 1990 – Clinton Watson

=== AFLPA Best First Year Player Award ===
- 2003 – Daniel Wells
- 2023 - Harry Sheezel

=== Marn Grook Award ===
- 2004 – Daniel Wells

=== Robert Rose Award ===
- 1998 – Glenn Archer
- 1999 – Glenn Archer
- 2002 – Glenn Archer
- 2003 – Glenn Archer
- 2005 – Glenn Archer
- 2006 – Glenn Archer

=== Madden Medal ===
- 2007 – Glenn Archer

=== Herald Sun Player of the Year Award ===
- 2008 – Brent Harvey

=== Norm Goss Medal ===
- 2008 – Josh Smith

=== Polly Farmer Medal ===
- 2008 – Matt Campbell

=== Jack Titus Award ===
- 1978 – Jack Adams
- 1986 – Jim Hannan
- 1990 – John Dugdale
- 1993 – Keith McKenzie
- 1999 – Laurie Dwyer

=== Jason McCartney Medal ===
- 2008 – Drew Petrie

=== Archer–Hird Medal ===
- 2009 – Brent Harvey

== AFLW Individual Awards ==
=== AFLW Best & Fairest ===
- 2025 – Ash Riddell

=== AFLW AFLPA MVP ===
- 2020 – Jasmine Garner
- 2023 – Jasmine Garner
- 2025 – Jasmine Garner

=== AFLW Coaches Association Awards ===
- 2020 – Jasmine Garner
- 2022 (S7) – Jasmine Garner
- 2023 – Jasmine Garner
- 2025 – Ash Riddell

=== AFLW Grand Final Best on Ground Award ===
- 2024 – Jasmine Garner
- 2025 – Eilish Sheerin

=== AFLW Senior Coach of the Year ===
- 2024 – Darren Crocker
- 2025 – Darren Crocker

== Rising Star ==
=== Rising Star Award ===
- 1998 – Byron Pickett
- 2023 – Harry Sheezel

=== Rising Star Nominees ===
- 1993 – Glenn Archer
- 1994 – Corey McKernan
- 1995 – Stuart Anderson; Matthew Capuano
- 1996 – Peter Bell; Adam Simpson
- 1998 – Evan Hewitt; Byron Pickett
- 2000 – Adam Lange
- 2001 – Daniel Harris
- 2003 – Daniel Motlop; Daniel Wells
- 2004 – Michael Firrito
- 2006 – Brad Moran; Andrew Swallow
- 2007 – Scott McMahon; Jesse Smith
- 2008 – Gavin Urqhart
- 2009 – Jack Ziebell
- 2010 – Ryan Bastinac; Sam Wright
- 2013 – Aaron Mullett
- 2014 – Luke McDonald
- 2016 - Ryan Clarke
- 2019 - Bailey Scott, Cameron Zurhaar, Tarryn Thomas, Nick Larkey
- 2020 - Curtis Taylor
- 2022 - Jason Horne-Francis
- 2023 - Harry Sheezel

=== AFLW Rising Star Nominees ===
- 2019 – Courteney Munn
- 2021 – Daisy Bateman
- 2022 (S6) – Mia King, Bella Eddey

== Mark and Goal of the Year ==
=== Mark of the Year ===
- 1978 – Phil Baker
- 1991 – Brett Allison
- 1998 – Winston Abraham
- 2016 - Majak Daw

=== Goal of the Year ===
- 1976 – Keith Greig
- 1978 – Phil Baker
- 1986 – Jim Krakouer
- 1988 – Matthew Larkin
- 2004 – Daniel Wells

=== AFLW Mark of the year ===
- 2022(S6) – Tahlia Randall

== Goalkickers ==
=== Association Top Goalkicker ===
- 1885 – Dick Houston (35 goals)
- 1910 – Frank Caine (75 goals)
- 1918 – Thos Stevens (54 goals)

=== Leading Goalkicker Medal ===
- 1941 – Sel Murray (88 goals)

=== Coleman Medal ===
- 1972 – Doug Wade (103 Goals)
- 1982 – Malcolm Blight (103 Goals)
- 1990 – John Longmire (98 Goals)

== Team of the Century ==
=== AFL Team of the Century ===
- Keith Greig (wing)

=== Indigenous Team of the Century ===
- Barry Cable (coach)
- Jim Krakouer (forward pocket)
- Byron Pickett (interchange)

=== Greek Team of the Century ===
- Andrew Demetriou (wing)
- Arthur Karanicolas
- Dr. Con Mitropoulos (doctor)

=== Italian Team of the Century ===
- Ron Barassi (coach)
- Saverio Rocca (full-forward)

== All Australians ==
=== Sporting Life Team of the Year ===
- 1949 – Les Foote
- 1954 – John Brady

=== National All Australians ===
- 1958 – Allan Aylett; John Dugdale
- 1961 – Allan Aylett
- 1966 – Noel Teasdale
- 1969 – Peter Steward
- 1979 – Graham Cornes; Darryl Sutton
- 1980 – Darryl Sutton
- 1983 – Keith Greig; Stephen McCann; Ross Glendinning

=== V/AFL Teams of the Year ===
- 1982 – Malcom Blight; Gary Dempsey; Ross Glendinning
- 1983 – Ross Glendinning
- 1984 – Ross Glendinning; Kym Hodgeman
- 1986 – Jim Krakouer
- 1987 – Jim Krakouer
- 1988 – Matthew Larkin
- 1990 – John Longmire

=== AFL All Australians ===
- 1993 – Wayne Carey (captain)
- 1994 – Wayne Carey
- 1995 – Wayne Carey
- 1996 – Glenn Archer; Wayne Carey; Corey McKernan
- 1997 – David King
- 1998 – Wayne Carey (captain); Glenn Archer; David King; Anthony Stevens
- 1999 – Wayne Carey (captain); Peter Bell; Byron Pickett; Denis Pagan (coach)
- 2000 – Wayne Carey (captain); Brent Harvey
- 2002 – Glenn Archer; Adam Simpson
- 2005 – Shannon Grant; Brent Harvey
- 2007 – Brent Harvey
- 2008 – Brent Harvey
- 2011 – Drew Petrie
- 2013 – Scott Thompson
- 2015 – Todd Goldstein
- 2018 – Shaun Higgins
- 2019 – Ben Brown; Ben Cunnington
- 2023 – Nick Larkey

=== AFLW All Australians ===
- 2019 – Jess Duffin; Emma Kearney; Jasmine Garner; Emma King
- 2020 – Emma Kearney (Vice Captain); Jasmine Garner; Ash Riddell
- 2021 – Jasmine Garney; Emma Kearney
- 2022 (S6) – Emma Kearney; Ash Riddell; Jasmine Garner
- 2022 (S7) – Emma Kearney; Jasmine Garner
- 2023 – Emma Kearney, Jasmine Garner, Ash Riddell
- 2024 – Ash Riddell; Jasmine Garner; Alice O’Loughlin
- 2025 – Jasmine Garner; Ash Riddell; Tahlia Randall; Bláithín Bogue

== Representative sides ==
=== State representatives ===
- 1879 – Arthur Ley (VFA); Frank Lording (VFA); Billy McLean(VFA); Jimmy Robertson (VFA)
- 1881 – Levy (VFA); Ley (VFA); Frank Lording (VFA); Neeley (VFA); Patterson (VFA); Shaw (VFA); Walker (VFA); Wedd (VFA)
- 1891 – L. Carroll (VFA)
- 1924 – John Lewis (VFA vice-captain)
- 1925 – John Lewis (VFL); Dave Walsh (VFL)
- 1926 – John Lewis (VFL); Curly Linton (VFL); Bill Russ (VFL); Dave Walsh (VFL)
- 1927 – Leo Dwyer (VFL); Bill Russ (VFL); Dave Walsh (VFL)
- 1928 – Leo Dwyer (VFL)
- 1929 – Charles Cameron (VFL); Leo Dwyer (VFL)
- 1930 – Charles Cameron (VFL); John Lewis (VFL)
- 1931 – Charles Cameron (VFL); John Lewis (VFL)
- 1932 – Charles Cameron (VFL); Charlie Gaudion (VFL); Johnny Gregory (VFL); John Lewis (VFL)
- 1933 – Jimmy Adamson (VFL); Selwyn Baker (VFL); Charlie Gaudion (VFL); George Kennedy (VFL); Jack Wrout (VFL)
- 1934 – Charlie Gaudion (VFL); Jack Wrout (VFL)
- 1935 – Charlie Gaudion (VFL); John Lewis (VFL)
- 1936 – Charlie Gaudion (VFL captain)
- 1937 – Wally Carter (VFL); Roy Deller (VFL); Ted Ellis (VFL)
- 1938 – Jock Cordner (VFL)
- 1939 – Jimmy Adamson (VFL); Jock Cordner (VFL); George Kennedy (VFL); Sel Murray (VFL)
- 1941 – Sel Murray (VFL); Frank Stubbs (VFL)
- 1945 – Alan Crawford (VFL); Bill Findlay (VFL)
- 1946 – Syd Dyer (VFL); Les Foote (VFL)
- 1947 – Kevin Dynon (VFL); Les Foote (VFL)
- 1948 – Kevin Dynon (VFL); Keith McKenzie (VFL)
- 1949 – Kevin Dynon (VFL); Les Foote (VFL); Jock Lineen (VFL); Jock McCorkell (VFL)
- 1950 – Les Foote (VFL); Ted Jarrard (VFL)
- 1951 – Bob Brooker (VFL); Les Foote (VFL); Ted Jarrard (VFL); Keith McKenzie (VFL); Les Reeves (VFL)
- 1952 – Vic Lawrence (VFL); Les Mogg (VFL); Jock Spencer (VFL)
- 1953 – Kevin Dynon (VFL); Ted Jarrard (VFL)
- 1954 – John Brady (VFL); Neil Doolan (VFL)
- 1955 – Kevin McMahon (VFL); Jock Spencer (VFL)
- 1956 – Kevin McMahon (VFL); Jock Spencer (VFL)
- 1957 – Allen Aylett (VFL); John Brady (VFL); Gerald Eastmure (VFL); Neil Doolan (VFL); Bryan Martyn (VFL)
- 1958 – Allen Aylett (VFL); John Dugdale (VFL); Noel Teasdale (VFL)
- 1959 – Allen Aylett (VFL); John Brady (VFL); Jack Edwards (VFL); Gerald Eastmure (VFL); Albert Mantello (VFL); Noel Teasdale (VFL)
- 1960 – Allen Aylett (VFL); John Dugdale (VFL); Laurie Dwyer (VFL); Gerald Eastmure (VFL); Noel Teasdale (VFL); John Waddington (VFL)
- 1961 – Allen Aylett (VFL); Noel Teasdale (VFL)
- 1962 – Keith Robertson (VFL)
- 1963 – Allen Aylett (VFL); Noel Teasdale (VFL)
- 1964 – John Ibrahim (VFL); John Waddington (VFL)
- 1965 – Tom Allison (VFL) Noel Teasdale (VFL)
- 1966 – Alan Killigrew (VFL coach); Michael Gaudion (VFL); Bob Pascoe (VFL); Noel Teasdale (VFL)
- 1967 – Laurie Dwyer (VFL); Peter Steward (VFL); Noel Teasdale (VFL)
- 1968 – Peter Steward (VFL)
- 1969 – Sam Kekovich (Vic); Peter Steward (VFL)
- 1970 – Bernie McCarthy (VFL); Peter Steward (VFL)
- 1971 – Keith Greig (VFL); Denis Pagan (VFL)
- 1972 – Keith Greig (VFL)
- 1973 – Barry Davis (VFL captain); David Dench (VFL); Keith Greig (VFL); John Rantall (VFL)
- 1974 – Arnold Briedis (VFL); Keith Greig (VFL); John Rantall (VFL)
- 1975 – Malcolm Blight (VFL); Keith Greig (VFL)
- 1976 – Barry Cable (VFL)
- 1977 – Malcolm Blight (Vic); John Bryne (Vic); John Cassin (Vic); David Dench (Vic); Ross Henshaw (Vic); Steven Icke (Vic)
- 1978 – Keith Greig (Vic captain); Malcolm Blight (Vic); Peter Keenan (Vic); Ken Montgomery (Vic); Wayne Schimmelbusch (Vic)
- 1979 – Malcolm Blight (Vic captain); Darryl Sutton (Tas captain); Wayne Schimmelbusch (Vic SoS captain); Graham Cornes (SA)
- 1980 – Arnold Briedis (Vic); Gary Dempsey (Vic); Keith Greig (Vic); Stephen McCann (Vic); Wayne Schimmelbusch (Vic); Darryl Sutton (Tas)
- 1981 – Malcolm Blight (Vic captain); Gary Dempsey (Vic); Ross Glendinning (Vic); Wayne Schimmelbusch (Vic)
- 1982 – Ross Glendinning (Vic); Stephen McCann (Vic); Wayne Schimmelbusch (Vic)
- 1983 – Andrew Demetriou (Vic); David Dench (Vic); Ross Glendinning (Vic); Keith Greig Vic); Stephen McCann (Vic); Wayne Schimmelbusch (Vic)
- 1984 – Ross Glendinning (Vic); Keith Greig Vic); Stephen McCann (Vic)
- 1987 – Schimmelbusch (Vic captain); Matthew Larkin (Vic);
- 1988 – Brett Allison (ACT); Ross Smith (Vic) Matthew Larkin (Vic)
- 1989 – Matthew Larkin (Vic); Mick Martyn (Vic); Wayne Schwass (Vic)
- 1990 – Brett Allison (Vic); Wayne Carey (NSW); Michael Gallagher (Vic); John Longmire (NSW); Mick Martyn (Vic); Jose Romero (Vic)
- 1991 – Peter German (Vic); Matthew Larkin (Vic) Anthony Rock (Vic); Craig Sholl (Vic)
- 1992 – Wayne Carey (SA); Craig Sholl (Vic)
- 1993 – Wayne Carey (NSW captain); Brett Allison (NSW); Ben Buckley (Tasmania); Alex Ishchenko (WA); Dean Laidley (WA); John Longmire (NSW); Mark Roberts (NSW); Anthony Rock (Vic); Wayne Schwass (Vic); Ross Smith (Vic)
- 1994 – Craig Sholl (Vic)
- 1995 – Brett Allison (Allies); Dani Laidley (WA); Wayne Schwass (Vic); Anthony Stevens (Vic)
- 1996 – Glenn Archer (Vic), Dani Laidley (WA); Corey McKernan (Vic); Anthony Stevens (Vic)
- 1997 – Brett Allison (Allies); Glenn Archer (Vic); Anthony Stevens (Vic)
- 1999 – Brent Harvey (Vic); David King (Vic)
- 2008 – Brent Harvey (Vic)

=== International representatives ===
- 1967 – John Dugdale; Laurie Dwyer
- 1968 – Daryl O'Brien; John Dugdale
- 1984 – Ross Glendinning
- 1990 – Brett Allison
- 1998 – Wayne Carey (Captain); Anthony Stevens
- 1999 – Wayne Carey (Captain); Peter Bell; Anthony Stevens
- 2000 – Brent Harvey; David King
- 2001 – Brent Harvey; David King
- 2002 – Adam Simpson
- 2003 – Brent Harvey; Jess Sinclair; Adam Simpson; Daniel Wells
- 2004 – Brady Rawlings
- 2005 – Brent Harvey; Shannon Grant; Troy Makepeace; Daniel Wells
- 2008 – Brent Harvey (Captain); Matt Campbell; Michael Firrito (Goalkeeper); Drew Petrie; Daniel Wells
- 2011 – Andrew Swallow
- 2013 – Daniel Wells (Captain); Lindsay Thomas
- 2014 – Brent Harvey
- 2017 – Robbie Tarrant; Ben Brown; Shaun Higgins

== Australian Football Hall of Fame ==
=== Legends ===
- Ron Barassi
- Malcolm Blight
- Russell Ebert

=== Coaches ===
- John Kennedy, Sr.

=== Players ===
- Glenn Archer
- Allen Aylett
- Wayne Carey
- Barry Davis
- Gary Dempsey
- David Dench
- Wels Eicke
- Tom Fitzmaurice
- Les Foote
- Ross Glendinning
- Keith Greig
- Brent Harvey
- John Rantall
- Wayne Schimmelbusch
- Anthony Stevens
- Noel Teasdale
- Doug Wade
- Johnny Lewis

=== Media ===
- Ron Casey

== Club records ==
=== Highest V/AFL Scores ===
Rank	Score	Result	Opponent	Year	Ground
1	229	35.19 (229) – 16.9 (105)	Sydney	1993	Princes Park
2	209	32.17 (209) – 9.14 (68)	Richmond	1990	Melbourne Cricket Ground
3	204	30.24 (204) – 15.11 (101)	Fitzroy	1995	Princes Park
4	200	31.14 (200) – 10.13 (73)	Melbourne	1990	Melbourne Cricket Ground
5	193	29.19 (193) – 11.16(82)	Carlton	1983	Arden Street Oval

=== Highst AFLW Scores ===
Rank	Score	Result	Opponent	Year	Ground
1	114	18.6 (114) – 2.2 (14)	Fremantle	2025	Fremantle Oval
2	88	13.10 (88) – 3.2. (20)	Sydney	2025	York Park
3	87	14.3 (87) – 4.3 (27)	Sydney	2024	North Hobart Oval
3	87	13.9 (87) – 3.6 (24)	Port Adelaide	2023	Arden Street Oval
3	87	13.9 (87) – 2.3 (15)	Port Adelaide	2025	Arden Street Oval

=== Greatest V/AFL winning margins ===
Rank	Margin	Opponent	Score	Year	Ground
1	152	Preston	23.21 (159) – 1.1 (7)	1910	Murray Park
2	141	Richmond	32.17 (209) – 9.14 (68)	1990	Melbourne Cricket Ground
3	140	Sydney	27.23 (185) – 5.15 (45)	1983	Sydney Cricket Ground
4	131	Footscray	26.12 (168) – 5.7 (37)	1996	Melbourne Cricket Ground
5	129	Melbourne	25.22 (168) – 6.7 (43)	1981	Waverley Park

=== Greatest AFLW winning margins ===
Rank	Margin	Opponent	Score	Year	Ground
1	100	Fremantle	18.6 (114) – 2.2 (14)	2025	Fremantle Oval
2	72	Port Adelaide	13.9 (87) – 2.3 (15	2025	Arden Street Oval
3	69	Carlton	12.7 (79) – 1.4 (10)	2024	Princes Park
4	68	Sydney	13.10 (88) – 3.2 (20)	2025	York Park
5	66	Sydney	9.13 (67) – 0.1 (1)	2022 (S7)	Punt Road

=== Unbeaten streaks ===
Rank	Games	Sequence start	Sequence end
1	49	Rnd 17, 1914	2nd Semi Final, 1919
2	12	1st Semi Final 1977	Rnd 8, 1978
3	11	Rnd 14, 1998	2nd Preliminary Final, 1998
4	10	Rnd 5, 1999	Rnd 14, 1999
4	10	Rnd 1, 1912	Rnd 10, 1912

== Individual records ==
=== Most goals in a game ===
Rank	Goals	Player	Opponent	Year
1	14	John Longmire	Melbourne	1990
2	12	John Longmire	Richmond	1990
2	12	Frank Caine	Preston	1910
3	11	Wayne Carey	Melbourne	1996
3	11	Malcolm Blight	Footscray	1981
3	11	Jock Spencer	South Melbourne	1950

=== Most goals in a season ===
Rank	Goals	Player	Year
1	103	Doug Wade	1974
1	103	Malcolm Blight	1982
2	98	John Longmire	1990
3	91	John Longmire	1991
4	88	Sel Murray	1941

=== V/AFL Games Played (Above 250 games) ===
Rank	Games	Player	Years Played
1	432	Brent Harvey	1996-2016
2	316	Drew Petrie	2001-2016
3	315	Todd Goldstein	2008-2023
4	311	Glen Archer	1992-2007
5	306	Adam Simpson	1995-2009
5	306	Wayne Schimmelbusch	1973-1987
7	294	Keith Greig	1971-1985
8	292	Anthony Stevens	1989-2004
9	287	Mick Martyn	1988-2002
10	280	Jack Ziebell	2009-2023
11	275	David Dench	1969-1984
11	275	Michael Firrito	2003-2016
Correct to round 8, 2026

=== V/AFL Goals Kicked (Above 300 goals) ===
Rank	Goals	Player	Years Played
1	671	Wayne Carey	1989-2001
2	518	Brent Harvey	1996-2016
3	511	John Longmire	1988-95;1997-99
4	475	Jock Spencer	1948-1957
5	444	Malcolm Blight	1974-1982
6	428	Drew Petrie	2001-2016
7	411	Sel Murray	1937-44; 1948
8	358	John Dugdale	1955-1970
9	354	Wayne Schmmelbusch	1973-1987
10	352	Bill Findlay	1935-1945
11	325	Lindsay Thomas	2007-2017
12	321	Syd Dyer	1937-1947
13	300	Nick Larkey	2017-
Correct to round 8, 2026

=== AFLW Games Played (Above 50) ===
Rank	Games	Player	Years Played
1	90	Tahlia Randall	2019-
2	89	Jasmine Garner	2019-
3	85	Ash Riddell	2019-
4	83	Emma King	2019-
5	81	Jenna Bruton	2019-
6	79	Emma Kearney	2019-
7	74	Bella Eddey	2021-
8	72	Mia King	2020-
9	65	Jasmine Ferguson	2022 (S6)-
10	64	Kim Rennie	2022 (S6)-
10	64	Nicole Bresnehan	2019-
12	61	Sarah Wright	2020-
13	60	Amy Smith	2021-
14	59	Alice O'Loughlin	2021-
15	55	Tess Craven	2022-
16	50	Erika O'Shea	2022 (S7)-
Correct to end of 2025 season

=== AFLW Goals Scored (Above 20) ===
Rank	Goals	Player	Years Played
1	89	Jasmine Garner	2019-
2	82	Tahlia Randall	2019-
3	53	Emma King	2019-
4	46	Alice O'Loughlin	2021-
5	40	Kate Shierlaw	2023-
6	32	Bella Eddey	2021-
7	29	Sophie Abbatangelo	2019-2022 (S7)
8	25	Vikki Wall	2022-
8	25	Bláithín Bogue	2025-
Correct to end of 2025 season
