= List of North Melbourne Football Club leading goalkickers =

The following is a list of North Melbourne Football Club leading goalkickers in each season of the Australian Football League (formerly the Victorian Football League).

== VFL/AFL ==
| Season | Player(s) | Goals |
|---|---|---|
| 1925 | Joe Woods | 27 |
| 1926 | Fred Metcalf | 26 |
| 1927 | Charlie Tyson | 23 |
| 1928 | Clarrie Nolan | 24 |
| 1929 | John Dowling | 28 |
| 1930 | Bob Mathews | 29 |
| 1931 | Johnny Lewis | 25 |
| 1932 | Tom Fitzmaurice | 62 |
| 1933 | Tom Fitzmaurice (2) | 60 |
| 1934 | Tom Fitzmaurice (3) | 63 |
| 1935 | Johnny Lewis (2) | 23 |
| 1936 | Dudley Cassidy | 48 |
| 1937 | Stewart Anderson | 18 |
| 1938 | Sel Murray | 56 |
| 1939 | Sel Murray (2) | 78 |
| 1940 | Sel Murray (3) | 58 |
| 1941 | Sel Murray (4) | 88 |
| 1942 | Sel Murray (5) | 42 |
| 1943 | Bill Findlay | 43 |
| 1944 | Bill Findlay (2) | 55 |
| 1945 | Bill Findlay (3) | 49 |
| 1946 | Syd Dyer | 55 |
| 1947 | Syd Dyer (2) | 47 |
| 1948 | Don Condon | 38 |
| 1949 | Jock Spencer | 65 |
| 1950 | Jock Spencer (2) | 86 |
| 1951 | Jock Spencer (3) | 57 |
| 1952 | Jock Spencer (4) | 51 |
| 1953 | Gerald Marchesi | 49 |
| 1954 | Jock Spencer (5) | 38 |
| 1955 | Jock Spencer (6) | 68 |
| 1956 | Jock Spencer (7) | 40 |
| 1957 | John Dugdale | 37 |
| 1958 | John Dugdale (2) | 57 |
| 1959 | Peter Schofield | 47 |
| 1960 | John Dugdale (3) | 38 |
| 1961 | John Dugdale (4) | 47 |
| 1962 | John Dugdale (5) | 44 |
| 1963 | John Dugdale (6) | 30 |
| 1964 | John Dugdale (7) | 46 |
| 1965 | Frank Goode | 38 |
| 1966 | Frank Goode (2) | 49 |
| 1967 | Gary Farrant | 26 |
| 1968 | Doug Farrant | 35 |
| 1969 | Sam Kekovich | 56 |
| 1970 | Gary Farrant (2) | 32 |
| 1971 | Sam Kekovich (2) | 35 |
| 1972 | Vin Doolan | 19 |
| 1972 | Sam Kekovich (3) | 19 |
| 1973 | Doug Wade | 73 |
| 1974 | Doug Wade (2) | 103 |
| 1975 | Doug Wade (3) | 47 |
| 1976 | Wayne Schimmelbusch | 43 |
| 1977 | Brent Crosswell | 42 |
| 1978 | Malcolm Blight | 77 |
| 1979 | Malcolm Blight (2) | 60 |
| 1980 | Arnold Briedis | 53 |
| 1981 | Malcolm Blight (3) | 70 |
| 1982 | Malcolm Blight (4) | 103 |
| 1983 | Jim Krakouer | 44 |
| 1983 | Phil Krakouer | 44 |
| 1984 | Donald McDonald | 38 |
| 1985 | Phil Krakouer (2) | 35 |
| 1986 | Jim Krakouer (2) | 32 |
| 1987 | Phil Krakouer (3) | 43 |
| 1988 | Jim Krakouer (3) | 35 |
| 1989 | Ian Fairley | 28 |
| 1990 | John Longmire | 98 |
| 1991 | John Longmire (2) | 91 |
| 1992 | John Longmire (3) | 64 |
| 1993 | John Longmire (4) | 75 |
| 1994 | John Longmire (5) | 78 |
| 1995 | Wayne Carey | 65 |
| 1996 | Wayne Carey (2) | 82 |
| 1997 | Brett Allison | 43 |
| 1998 | Wayne Carey (3) | 80 |
| 1999 | Wayne Carey (4) | 76 |
| 2000 | Wayne Carey (5) | 69 |
| 2001 | Sav Rocca | 48 |
| 2002 | Sav Rocca (2) | 50 |
| 2003 | Leigh Harding | 33 |
| 2004 | Sav Rocca (3) | 49 |
| 2005 | Nathan Thompson | 52 |
| 2006 | Nathan Thompson (2) | 54 |
| 2007 | Corey Jones | 46 |
| 2008 | David Hale | 37 |
| 2009 | Drew Petrie | 27 |
| 2010 | Lindsay Thomas | 29 |
| 2011 | Drew Petrie (2) | 48 |
| 2012 | Drew Petrie (3) | 58 |
| 2013 | Lindsay Thomas (2) | 53 |
| 2014 | Drew Petrie (4) | 50 |
| 2015 | Drew Petrie (5) | 42 |
| 2015 | Jarrad Waite | 42 |
| 2016 | Ben Brown | 41 |
| 2017 | Ben Brown (2) | 63 |
| 2018 | Ben Brown (3) | 61 |
| 2019 | Ben Brown (4) | 64 |
| 2020 | Cameron Zurhaar | 18 |
| 2021 | Nick Larkey | 42 |
| 2022 | Nick Larkey (2) | 38 |
| 2023 | Nick Larkey (3) | 71 |
| 2024 | Nick Larkey (4) | 46 |
| 2025 | Nick Larkey (5) | 41 |
| 2026 | Nick Larkey (6) | 45 |

== AFL Women's ==
| Season | Player(s) | Goals |
|---|---|---|
| 2019 | Moana Hope | 9 |
| 2019 | Emma King | 9 |
| 2020 | Kaitlyn Ashmore | 9 |
| 2021 | Sophie Abbatangelo | 9 |
| 2021 | Jasmine Garner | 9 |
| 2022 (S6) | Jasmine Garner (2) | 11 |
| 2022 (S7) | Tahlia Randall | 12 |
| 2023 | Tahlia Randall (2) | 21 |
| 2024 | Alice O'Loughlin | 19 |
| 2025 | Blaithin Bogue | 25 |
