= List of North Melbourne Football Club coaches =

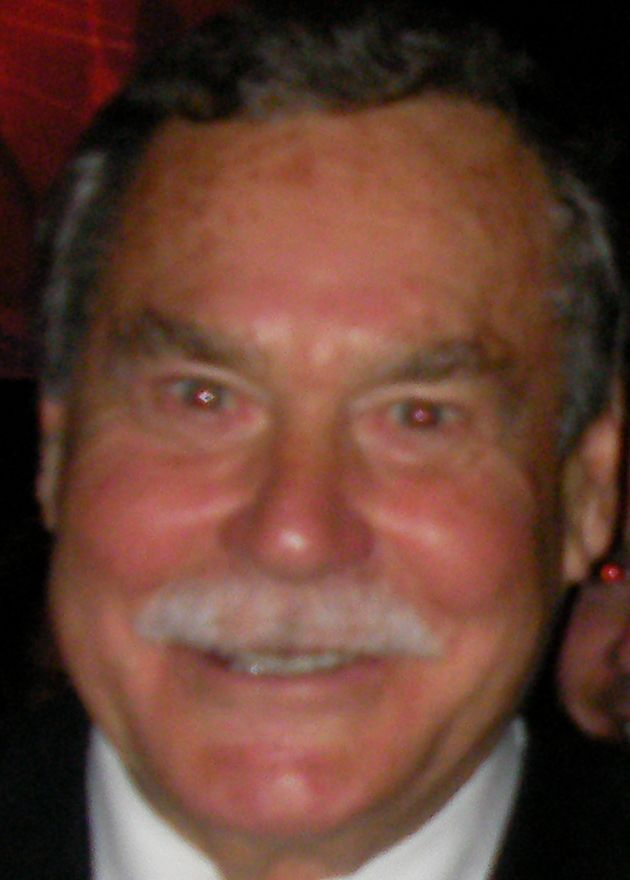
Ron Barrassi is the most successful coach in North Melbourne Football Club history.

The North Melbourne Football Club, also known as the Kangaroos, is an Australian Football League club based in North Melbourne, just 2 kilometres (1.2 mi) north of Melbourne metropolitan area. The North Melbourne Football Club was formed in 1869. It was purportedly established to satisfy the needs of local cricketers who were keen to keep themselves fit and healthy over the winter months. They entered the Victorian Football League (VFL) in 1925 after 48 years in the Victorian Football Association (VFA).

Wels Eicke became the first coach of the Kangaroos in the 1925 season, he resigned four games into the 1926 season. In terms of tenure, Denis Pagan has coached more games (240) and seasons (10) than any other coach in the club's history. He coached the Kangaroos to two AFL Premierships in the 1996 season and then again in the 1999 season. In terms of successfulness, Ron Barassi has been more successful (65.91% win–loss record) than any other coach in the club's history. There have been seven coaches in the North Melbourne Football Club's history that have been inducted to the Australian Football Hall of Fame. There have been eleven captain-coaches in Kangaroos history. First, in 1925, coach Wels Eicke become the first captain-coach in Kangaroos history. He played only 21 games for the Kangaroos and coached 20 of those games.

== Key ==
#	Number of coaches (Note: A running total of the number of coaches of the Kangaroos. Thus any coach who has two separate terms as head coach is only counted once)
GC	Games coached
W	Wins
L	Losses
D	Draws
P	Premierships
R	Runners Up
W–L %	Win–loss percentage
	Inducted to the Australian Football Hall of Fame
	Played as a captain-coach
	Both captain-coach and hall of famer.

Statistics are correct to the end of round 22, 2022.

== VFL/AFL ==
#	Name	Term	Home & Away					Finals					Overall					Awards	Ref
#	Name	Term	GC	W	L	D	W–L %	GC	W	L	P	R	GC	W	L	D	W–L %	Awards	Ref
1	Wels Eicke	1925–1926	20	5	15	0	25.00	0	0	0	0	0.00	20	5	15	0	25.00		
2	Stan Thomas	1926	1 (Note: Thomas coached the Kangaroos for a single match in 1926, while a replacement coach was found after the resignation of Wells Eicke.)	0	1	0	0.00	0	0	0	0	0.00	1	0	1	0	0.00		
3	Gerry Donnelly	1926	14	0	13	1	0.00	0	0	0	0	0.00	14	0	13	1	0.00		
4	Syd Barker, Sr.	1927	18	3	15	0	16.67	0	0	0	0	0.00	18	3	15	0	16.67		
5	Charlie Tyson	1928–1929	23	5	18	0	21.74	0	0	0	0	0.00	23	5	18	0	21.74		
6	Paddy Noonan	1929	13	1	12	0	7.69	0	0	0	0	0.00	13	1	12	0	7.69		
7	Johnny Lewis	1930	18	1	17	0	5.56	0	0	0	0	0.00	18	1	17	0	5.56		
8	Norm Clark	1931	10	0	10	0	0.00	0	0	0	0	0.00	10	0	10	0	0.00		
9	John Pemberton	1931	8	0	8	0	0.00	0	0	0	0	0.00	8	0	8	0	0.00		
10	Dick Taylor	1932–1934	42	14	27	1	34.52	0	0	0	0	0.00	42	14	27	1	34.52		
11	Charlie Cameron	1932	4 (Note: Cameron coach for four games as Dick Taylor out suspended for four weeks for elbowing opponent.)	1	3	0	25.00	0	0	0	0	0.00	4	1	3	0	25.00		
12	Tom Fitzmaurice	1934–1935	16	0	16	0	0.00	0	0	0	0	0.00	8	0	8	0	0.00		
13	Paddy Scanlan	1935–1937	46	8	38	0	17.39	0	0	0	0	0.00	46	8	38	0	17.39		
14	Keith Forbes	1938–1939	34	11	23	0	32.35	0	0	0	0	0.00	34	11	23	0	32.35		
15	Ted Cusack	1939	2 (Note: Cusack coached final two games of season after Keith Forbes out suspended for threatening umpire.)	1	1	0	50.00	0	0	0	0	0.00	2	1	1	0	50.00		
16	Len Thomas	1940	12	4	8	0	33.33	0	0	0	0	0.00	12	4	8	0	33.33		
17	Jim Adamson	1940	6	0	6	0	0.00	0	0	0	0	0.00	6	0	6	0	0.00		
18	Bob McCaskill	1941–1942	25	8	17	0	32.00	0	0	0	0	0.00	25	8	17	0	32.00		
19	Bill Findlay	1942–1943	22	7	14	1	34.09	0	0	0	0	0.00	22	7	14	1	34.09		
0	Bob McCaskill	1944–1947	77	35	42	0	45.45	1	0	1	0	0.00	78	35	43	0	44.87		
20	Wally Carter	1948–1953	116	61	55	0	52.57	5	2	3	0	40.00	121	63	58	0	52.07		
21	Jock McCorkell	1954–1955	37	14	22	1	39.19	1	0	1	0	0.00	38	14	23	1	36.84		
22	Charlie Gaudion	1956–1957	36	11	25	0	30.56	0	0	0	0	0.00	36	11	25	0	30.56		
0	Wally Carter	1958–1962	92	35	57	1	38.04	2	1	1	0	50.00	94	36	58	0	38.30		
23	Alan Killigrew	1963–1966	70	27	42	1	39.29	0	0	0	0	0.00	70	27	42	1	39.29	1965 Golden Fleece Night Premiership winning coach 1966 Golden Fleece Night Premiership winning coach 1966 State Carnival Winning Coach	
24	Keith McKenzie	1966–1970	82	23	58	1	28.66	0	0	0	0	0.00	82	23	58	1	28.66		
25	Brian Dixon	1971–1972	44	6	37	1	14.77	0	0	0	0	0.00	44	6	37	1	14.77		
26	Ron Barassi	1973–1980	198	130	65	3	66.41	23	12	10	1	52.17	221	142	75	4	65.15	1975 Premiership winning coach 1975 National Champions winning coach 1976 McClelland Trophy; 1977 Premiership winning coach 1978 McClelland Trophy; 1980 Escort Cup winning coach	
27	Ray Jordon	1976	1 (Note: Jordon coached the Kangaroos for a single match in Round 21, 1976.)	0	1	0	0.00	0	0	0	0	0.00	1	1	0	0	100.00		
28	John Dugdale	1977	1 (Note: Dugdale coached the Kangaroos for a single match in Round 12, 1977)	0	1	0	0.00	0	0	0	0	0.00	1	0	1	0	0.00		
29	Malcolm Blight	1981	16	6	10	0	37.50	0	0	0	0	0.00	16	6	10	0	37.50		
30	Barry Cable	1981–1984	76	40	36	0	52.63	4	1	3	0	25.00	80	41	39	0	51.25	McClelland Trophy 1983	
31	John Kennedy, Sr.	1985–1989	113	55	55	3	50.00	3	1	2	0	33.33	116	56	57	3	48.28		
32	Wayne Schimmelbusch	1990–1992	66	31	35	0	46.97	0	0	0	0	0.00	66	31	35	0	46.97		
33	Denis Pagan	1993–2002	240	150	90	0	62.50	22	14	8	2	63.64	262	164	98	2	62.60	1995 Ansett Cup winning coach 1996 Premiership winning coach 1998 Ansett Cup winning coach 1998 McClelland Trophy; 1999 Premiership winning coach	
34	Dean Laidley	2003–2009	149	72	75	2	48.99	5	1	4	0	20.00	154	73	79	2	47.40		
35	Darren Crocker	2009, 2015, 2016	15	6	8	1	35.00	0	0	0	0	0.00	10	3	6	1	35.00		
36	Brad Scott	2010-2019	158	86	72	0	54.67	7	4	3	0	57.14	211	106	105	0	50.25		
37	Rhyce Shaw	2019–2020	29	10	19	0	34.48	0	0	0	0	0.00	29	10	19	0	34.48		
38	David Noble	2021–2022	38	5	32	1	14.47	0	0	0	0	0.00	38	5	32	1	14.47		
39	Leigh Adams	2022 (Note: Adams replaced Noble as caretaker coach for the last six games of the 2022 season.)	5	1	4	0	20.00	0	0	0	0	0.00	5	1	4	0	20.00		
40	Alastair Clarkson	2023–2026	82	20	61	1	25.00	0	0	0	0	0.00	82	20	61	1	25.00		
41	Brett Ratten	2023 (Note: Ratten coached for 10 games while Clarkson took a break for mental health reasons during the 2023 season.)	10	0	10	0	0.00	0	0	0	0	0.00	10	0	10	0	0.00		

== AFL Women's ==
Season(s)	Coach	Notes
2019–2020	Scott Gowans	
2021–	Darren Crocker	2024 and 2025 premiership coach
