= List of North Melbourne Football Club premiership results =

This is a list of North Melbourne Football Club premiership results since the club's inception in 1869.

== VFA premierships ==
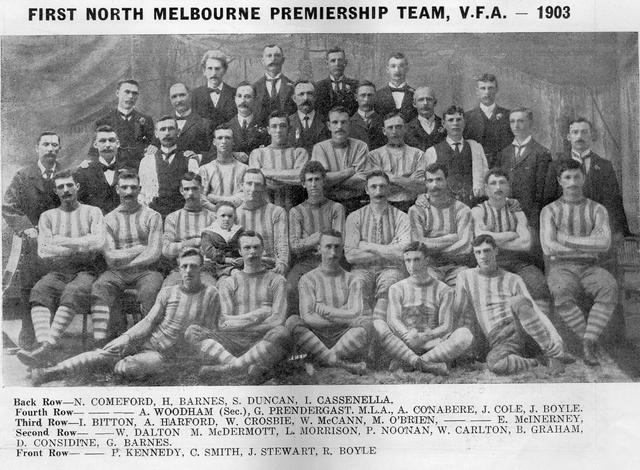
1903 VFA premiership side.

1903 VFA Challenge Final	G	B	Total
North Melbourne	7	6	48
Richmond	3	9	27
Venue: East Melbourne Cricket Ground	Crowd: 20,000		

1904 VFA Challenge Final	G	B	Total
North Melbourne	-	-	Forfeit ^{1}
Richmond	-	-	-
Venue: None	Crowd: 0		

1910 VFA Challenge Final	G	B	Total
North Melbourne	9	14	68
Brunswick	5	9	39
Venue: Arden St Oval	Crowd: 28,000		

1914 VFA Final	G	B	Total
North Melbourne	12	14	86
Footscray	7	9	51
Venue: East Melbourne Cricket Ground	Crowd: 12,000		

1915 VFA Final	G	B	Total
North Melbourne	11	10	76
Brunswick	3	10	28
Venue: Arden St Oval	Crowd: 8,000		

1918 VFA Final	G	B	Total
North Melbourne	18	13	121
Prahran	3	10	28
Venue: Arden St Oval	Crowd: 7,000		

^{1} The Challenge Final was scratched and North Melbourne were awarded the premiership after Richmond objected to the umpire chosen for the match and refused to play.

== Under 19 premierships ==
1946 VFL Under-19s Grand Final	G	B	Total
North Melbourne	11	9	75
Carlton	5	12	42
Venue: Warringal Park	Crowd: ?		

1976 VFL Under-19s Grand Final	G	B	Total
North Melbourne	16	13	109
Richmond	15	16	106
Venue: Melbourne Cricket Ground	Crowd: ?		

1984 VFL Under-19s Grand Final	G	B	Total
North Melbourne	17	19	121
Richmond	7	11	53
Venue: Melbourne Cricket Ground	Crowd: ?		

1987 VFL Under-19s Grand Final	G	B	Total
North Melbourne	13	16	94
Richmond	13	11	89
Venue: Melbourne Cricket Ground	Crowd: ?		

1988 VFL Under-19s Grand Final	G	B	Total
North Melbourne	18	16	124
Essendon	6	5	41
Venue: Melbourne Cricket Ground	Crowd: ?		

1990 AFL Under-19s Grand Final	G	B	Total
North Melbourne	16	12	108
Melbourne	5	14	44
Venue: Melbourne Cricket Ground	Crowd: ?		

1991 AFL Under-19s Grand Final	G	B	Total
North Melbourne	14	15	99
Collingwood	8	13	61
Venue: VFL Park	Crowd: ?		

Note: Prior to the establishment of the U-19s comp in 1946, North Melbourne fielded a successful Colts side in a local fixture which was responsible for developing junior stars like Dally O'Brien, Les Foote, Don Condon, Kevin Dynon and Keith McKenzie

== Reserve premierships ==
1947 VFL Reserves Grand Final	G	B	Total
North Melbourne	16	13	109
Richmond	14	10	94
Venue: Melbourne Cricket Ground	Crowd: ?		

1957 VFL Reserves Grand Final	G	B	Total
North Melbourne	14	13	97
Fitzroy	13	15	93
Venue: Melbourne Cricket Ground	Crowd: ?		

1967 VFL Reserves Grand Final	G	B	Total
North Melbourne	15	13	103
Richmond	10	19	79
Venue: Melbourne Cricket Ground	Crowd: ?		

1978 VFL Reserves Grand Final	G	B	Total
North Melbourne	17	29	131
Hawthorn	11	13	79
Venue: ?	Crowd: ?		

1979 VFL Reserves Grand Final	G	B	Total
North Melbourne	13	14	92
Collingwood	9	13	67
Venue: VFL Park	Crowd: 6047		

1995 AFL Reserves Grand Final	G	B	Total
North Melbourne	13	16	94
Sydney	11	14	80
Venue: Melbourne Cricket Ground	Crowd: ?		

1996 AFL Reserves Grand Final	G	B	Total
North Melbourne	23	18	156
Essendon	7	10	52
Venue: Melbourne Cricket Ground	Crowd: ?		

== Night and pre-season premierships ==
1965 VFL Night Series Grand Final	G	B	Total
North Melbourne	14	13	97
Carlton	9	3	57
Venue: Lake Oval	Crowd: 37,750		

1966 VFL Night Series Grand Final	G	B	Total
North Melbourne	20	12	132
Hawthorn	12	7	79
Venue: Lake Oval	Crowd: 22,800		

1980 VFL Night Series Grand Final	G	B	Total
North Melbourne	8	9	57
Collingwood	7	12	54
Venue: Waverley Park	Crowd: 50,478		

1995 AFL Pre-season Grand Final	G	B	Total
North Melbourne	14	9	93
Adelaide	8	15	63
Venue: Waverley Park	Crowd: 39,393		

1998 AFL Pre-season Grand Final	G	B	Total
North Melbourne	14	13	97
St Kilda	12	11	83
Venue: Waverley Park	Crowd: 49,874		

== VFL/AFL premierships ==
1975 VFL Grand Final	G	B	Total
North Melbourne	19	8	122
Hawthorn	9	13	67
Venue: Melbourne Cricket Ground	Crowd: 110,551		

1977 VFL Grand Final Replay	G	B	Total
North Melbourne	21	25	151
Collingwood	19	10	124
Venue: Melbourne Cricket Ground	Crowd: 98,366		

1996 AFL Grand Final	G	B	Total
North Melbourne	19	17	131
Sydney	13	10	88
Venue: Melbourne Cricket Ground	Crowd: 93,102		

1999 AFL Grand Final	G	B	Total
North Melbourne	19	10	124
Carlton	12	17	89
Venue: Melbourne Cricket Ground	Crowd: 94,228		

== Champions of Australia ==
1975 Championship of Australia	G	B	Total
North Melbourne	17	15	117
Norwood	5	11	41
Venue: Football Park	Crowd: 17,576		

Note: The Champions of Australia series was discontinued after 1975. As a result, North Melbourne retains both the Winfield Cup as a permanent memento of the victory, and retains the perpetual Australia Cup.
