= Bosustow =

Bosustow is a surname. Notable people with the surname include:

- Bob Bosustow (1934–1997), Australian rules footballer
- John Bosustow (1817–1880), American politician
- Nick Bosustow (1940–2022), American film producer, son of Stephen
- Peter Bosustow (1957–2025), Australian rules footballer, son of Bob
- Stephen Bosustow (1911–1981), Canadian-born American film producer
