= List of kicks after the siren in the VFL/AFL =

In Australian rules football, if a player takes a mark or is awarded a free kick before the siren sounds to end a quarter, and the siren sounds before the player takes a set shot, the player is allowed to take the kick after the siren. Often, the result of this kick is of little consequence, but if the player is within range of goal, any score will count towards the final result.

The right to take a set shot after the final bell was enshrined in the Laws of the Game prior to the 1889 season; prior to this, the ball was declared dead (and any opportunity for a set shot lost) once the bell sounded. In years past, when it was still common for spectators to run onto the field as soon as matches were over, it was not uncommon for players to have to take these shots from within the flood of incoming spectators. The kick after the siren has often been said to be one of the great spectacles of Australian rules football, alongside the high mark and on-field crowd celebrations after a player kicks 100 goals for a season.

Below is a list of occasions in the Australian Football League (known as the Victorian Football League until 1990) where game results have been decided by set shots taken after the final siren, a play similar to the buzzer-beater in basketball. These are highly memorable and often go down in football folklore.

== Goal to win ==
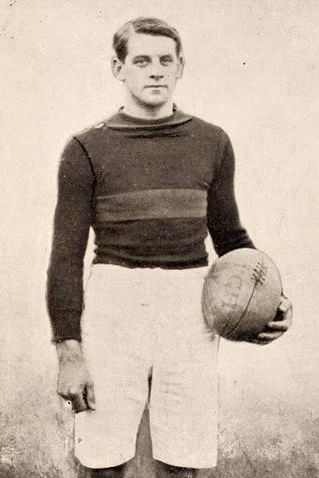
St Kilda's Billy Schmidt is the first known player to have kicked a goal to win after the siren. His set shot attempt led the Saints to victory over Carlton in round 15, 1913.

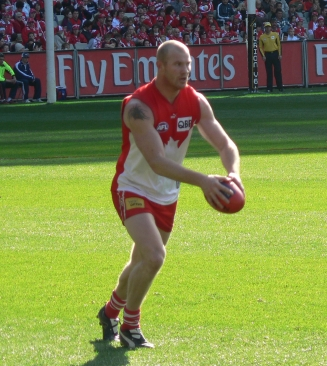
Barry Hall is the first player to have kicked a goal after the siren to win on two occasions. Hall achieved the feat for St Kilda against Hawthorn in round 21, 2001—incidentally, his last game for the club—before repeating his heroics for Sydney in its round 3, 2005 clash against the Brisbane Lions.

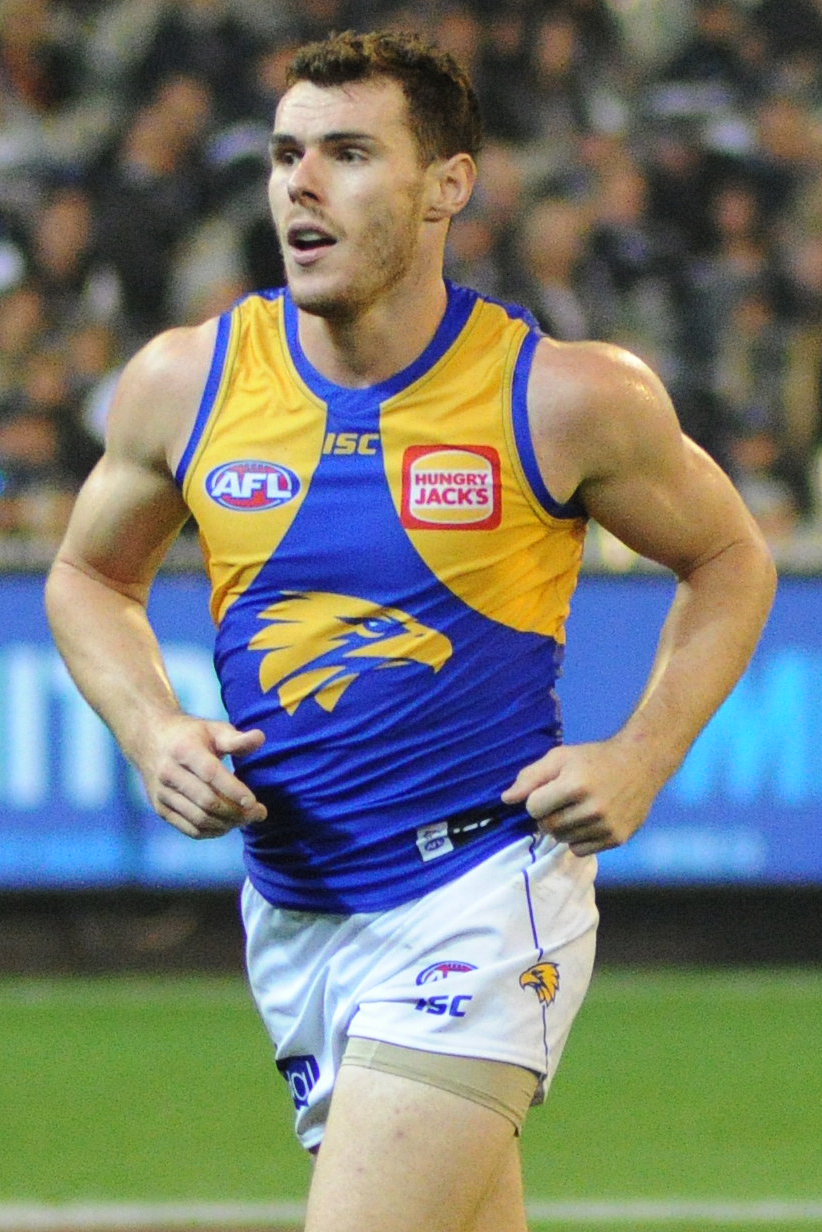
West Coast's Luke Shuey is the only player to have kicked a goal to win after the siren in extra time in the VFL/AFL. His goal from a free kick in the 2017 elimination final allowed the Eagles to progress past Port Adelaide.

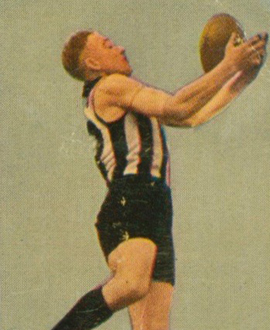
Collingwood's Alan Ryan is the first known player to have kicked a goal to draw a match after the siren. His goal from a free kick tied the scores in the Magpies' round 2, 1935 match against Fitzroy.

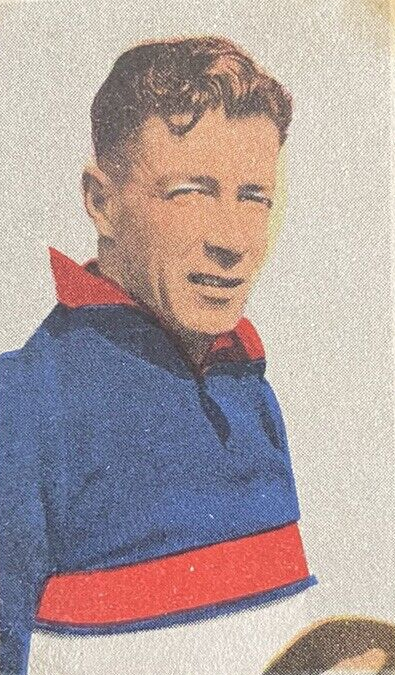
Footscray's Harry Hickey is the first known player to have kicked a behind to win after the siren. His set shot attempt in the Bulldogs' round 18, 1944 match over Carlton not only led his side to victory, but also secured Footscray's spot in the next week's finals series, ironically at the expense of the Blues.

Players to have kicked a goal to win a match after the final siren
Player	Club	Opponent	Rd.	Year	Final score	Ref.
Billy Schmidt	St Kilda	Carlton	15	1913	10.10 (70) d. 11.3 (69)	
Jimmy Gordon	Essendon	University	16	1913	9.8 (62) d. 8.12 (60)	
Eric Fleming	Geelong	Fitzroy	12	1924	9.14 (68) d. 9.11 (65)	
Doug Strang	Richmond	Carlton	14	1932	13.13 (91) d. 12.14 (86)	
Terry Brain	South Melbourne	Collingwood	14	1933	13.11 (89) d. 12.11 (83)	
Ron Cooper	Carlton	Essendon	7	1939	10.18 (78) d. 10.12 (72)	
Jack Wrout	Carlton	North Melbourne	14	1939	11.13 (79) d. 10.13 (73)	
Bill Wood	Footscray	Richmond	15	1946	14.15 (99) d. 12.21 (93)	
Jock Spencer	North Melbourne	Geelong	7	1949	8.13 (61) d. 8.7 (55)	
Bill Nolan	South Melbourne	St Kilda	13	1952	6.8 (44) d. 5.8 (38)	
John Peck	Hawthorn	Collingwood	13	1960	7.16 (58) d. 7.15 (57)	
Blair Campbell	Richmond	South Melbourne	17	1966	10.12 (72) d. 10.11 (71)	
Bill Ryan	Geelong	Collingwood	1	1967	13.13 (91) d. 13.12 (90)	
Doug Wade	North Melbourne	Collingwood	16	1973	11.10 (76) d. 10.11 (71)	
Malcolm Blight	North Melbourne	Carlton	10	1976	11.15 (81) d. 11.10 (76)	
Alan Stoneham	Footscray	Fitzroy	21	1976	4.11 (35) d. 3.16 (34)	
Robert Elliott	St Kilda	North Melbourne	14	1978	18.16 (124) d. 19.7 (121)	
John Roberts	South Melbourne	Geelong	1	1980	13.10 (88) d. 12.13 (85)	
Paul Sarah	Richmond	St Kilda	19	1981	10.11 (71) d. 9.11 (65)	
Alastair Clarkson	North Melbourne	Melbourne	15	1987	16.16 (112) d. 15.20 (110)	
Stephen Kernahan	Carlton	North Melbourne	22	1987	20.9 (129) d. 19.11 (125)	
Gary Buckenara	Hawthorn	Melbourne	PF	1987	11.14 (80) d. 10.18 (78)	
Rod Jameson	Adelaide	Fitzroy	12	1991	7.8 (50) d. 7.5 (47)	
Bill Brownless	Geelong	Footscray	QF	1994	15.16 (106) d. 15.11 (101)	
Gary Ablett Sr.	Geelong	North Melbourne	PF	1994	16.13 (109) d. 14.19 (103)	
Quenton Leach	Fremantle	Brisbane Lions	8	1997	14.14 (98) d. 15.3 (93)	
Peter Burgoyne	Port Adelaide	Carlton	21	2000	12.16 (88) d. 12.11 (83)	
Ben Dixon	Hawthorn	Carlton	17	2001	15.6 (96) d. 13.15 (93)	
Barry Hall	St Kilda	Hawthorn	22	2001	13.11 (89) d. 13.9 (87)	
Daryn Cresswell	Sydney	Kangaroos	4	2002	15.13 (103) d. 14.16 (100)	
Jeff Farmer	Fremantle	Melbourne	8	2002	14.10 (94) d. 13.11 (89)	
Peter Riccardi	Geelong	Carlton	11	2002	15.10 (100) d. 14.12 (96)	
Jared Poulton	Port Adelaide	Sydney	15	2002	14.10 (94) d. 13.14 (92)	
Chris Tarrant	Collingwood	Adelaide	7	2003	18.6 (114) d. 16.13 (109)	
Barry Hall (2)	Sydney	Brisbane Lions	3	2005	13.9 (87) d. 11.15 (81)	
Justin Longmuir	Fremantle	St Kilda	21	2005	12.8 (80) d. 11.9 (75)	
Jordan McMahon	Richmond	Melbourne	18	2009	12.14 (86) d. 12.10 (82)	
Karmichael Hunt	Gold Coast	Richmond	16	2012	13.12 (90) d. 13.10 (88)	
Tom Hawkins	Geelong	Hawthorn	19	2012	18.10 (118) d. 17.14 (116)	
Nic Naitanui	West Coast	North Melbourne	8	2013	12.18 (90) d. 13.10 (88)	
Ashley McGrath	Brisbane Lions	Geelong	13	2013	15.13 (103) d. 14.14 (98)	
Sam Lloyd	Richmond	Sydney	8	2016	14.17 (101) d. 15.10 (100)	
David Mundy	Fremantle	Richmond	8	2017	10.12 (72) d. 10.10 (70)	
Gary Rohan	Sydney	Essendon	14	2017	11.20 (86) d. 12.13 (85)	
Luke Shuey	West Coast	Port Adelaide	EF	2017	12.6 (78) d. 10.16 (76) (Note: After extra time.)	
Zach Tuohy	Geelong	Melbourne	18	2018	16.4 (100) d. 14.14 (98)	
Jeremy McGovern	West Coast	Port Adelaide	21	2018	9.8 (62) d. 9.4 (58)	
Robbie Gray	Port Adelaide	Carlton	7	2020	9.10 (64) d. 9.7 (61)	
Jack Newnes	Carlton	Fremantle	12	2020	5.10 (40) d. 5.6 (36)	
Zac Bailey	Brisbane Lions	Collingwood	3	2021	11.7 (73) d. 11.6 (72)	
Gary Rohan (2)	Geelong	Western Bulldogs	14	2021	12.11 (83) d. 11.12 (78)	
Max Gawn	Melbourne	Geelong	23	2021	12.9 (81) d. 12.5 (77)	
Jordan Dawson	Adelaide	Port Adelaide	3	2022	15.6 (96) d. 13.14 (92)	
Noah Anderson	Gold Coast	Richmond	17	2022	14.10 (94) d. 13.14 (92)	
Jamie Elliott	Collingwood	Essendon	19	2022	12.8 (80) d. 11.10 (76)	
Dan Houston	Port Adelaide	Essendon	16	2023	11.12 (78) d. 10.14 (74)	
Mac Andrew	Gold Coast	Essendon	22	2024	13.9 (87) d. 12.14 (86)	
Nasiah Wanganeen-Milera	St Kilda	Melbourne	20	2025	15.6 (96) d. 13.12 (90)	
Cameron Zurhaar	North Melbourne	Gold Coast	11	2026	17.9 (111) d. 16.9 (105)	

== Goal to draw ==
Players to have kicked a goal to draw a match after the final siren
Player	Club	Opponent	Rd.	Year	Final score	Ref.
Alan Ryan	Collingwood	Fitzroy	2	1935	14.9 (93) drew 14.9 (93)	
Ron Baggott	Melbourne	Collingwood	16	1935	10.19 (79) drew 11.13 (79)	
Stephen MacPherson	Footscray	North Melbourne	20	1987	18.17 (125) drew 18.17 (125)	
Ray Windsor	Brisbane Bears	West Coast	5	1992	14.8 (92) drew 13.14 (92)	
Ashley Sampi	West Coast	Western Bulldogs	11	2003	19.10 (124) drew 19.10 (124)	
Daniel Bradshaw	Brisbane Lions	Essendon	19	2009	12.15 (87) drew 13.9 (87)	
Mitch McGovern	Adelaide	Collingwood	19	2017	16.7 (103) drew 15.13 (103)	
Dylan Moore	Hawthorn	Collingwood	8	2026	13.15 (93) drew 15.3 (93)	

== Behind to win ==
Players to have kicked a behind to win a match after the final siren
Player	Club	Opponent	Rd.	Year	Final score	Ref.
Harry Hickey	Footscray	Carlton	18	1944	12.17 (89) d. 13.10 (88)	
Ken Newland	Geelong	Collingwood	20	1972	17.10 (112) d. 17.9 (111)	
Tony Lockett	Sydney	Essendon	PF	1996	10.10 (70) d. 10.9 (69)	
Jimmy Bartel	Geelong	Hawthorn	17	2009	15.9 (99) d. 14.14 (98)	
Michael Walters	Fremantle	Brisbane Lions	10	2019	10.13 (73) d. 10.12 (72)	

== Behind to draw ==
Players to have kicked a behind to draw a match after the final siren
Player	Club	Opponent	Rd.	Year	Final score	Ref.
Gerry Donnelly	North Melbourne	Hawthorn	13	1926	10.10 (70) drew 10.10 (70)	
Matthew Lloyd	Essendon	Western Bulldogs	14	2002	17.16 (118) drew 18.10 (118)	
Tom Hawkins	Geelong	Greater Western Sydney	15	2017	10.8 (68) drew 10.8 (68)	

== Missed opportunities ==
A list of instances where a player had a shot at goal after the siren to win or draw the game but missed, resulting in a loss, or instances where a player has had a kick after the siren with scores level but failed to score. This list does not include instances where an opportunity for a set-shot after the siren is passed up in favour of playing on.

Players to have missed an opportunity to win or draw a match after the final siren
Player	Team	Opponent	Rd.	Year	Final score	Outcome	Ref.
George Holden	Fitzroy	Collingwood	17	1915	8.11 (59) lost to 8.13 (61)	Behind	
Fred Metcalf	North Melbourne	Geelong	3	1927	8.5 (53) lost to 7.13 (55)	No score (out on the full)	
Ron Barassi Sr.	Melbourne	Geelong	10	1940	22.19 (151) lost to 24.10 (154)	Behind	
Col Williamson	St Kilda	Geelong	2	1941	11.19 (85) lost to 13.9 (87)	No score (fell short)	
Jack Pimm	Collingwood	Geelong	15	1948	10.13 (73) lost to 10.18 (78)	Behind	
Fred Flanagan	Geelong	Richmond	7	1950	9.20 (74) lost to 12.7 (79)	No score (fell short)	
Harvey Stevens	Footscray	Richmond	13	1954	6.9 (45) lost to 6.13 (49)	No score (out on the full)	
Ralph Rogerson	Fitzroy	Carlton	7	1964	8.11 (59) lost to 8.12 (60)	No score (fell short)	
Alex Jesaulenko	Carlton	Richmond	SF	1972	8.13 (61) drew 8.13 (61)	No score (fell short)	
Malcolm Blight	North Melbourne	Hawthorn	12	1977	6.11 (47) lost to 6.12 (48)	No score (out on the full)	
Warren Ralph	Carlton	Collingwood	5	1984	9.17 (71) lost to 10.16 (76)	Behind	
Robert Scott	Geelong	Sydney	6	1988	16.15 (111) lost to 17.12 (114)	Behind (hit the goal post)	
Simon Beasley	Footscray	Brisbane Bears	7	1988	9.17 (71) lost to 10.12 (72)	Behind	
Steven Clark	Melbourne	Essendon	11	1991	12.8 (80) lost to 12.14 (86)	No score (fell short)	
Stephen Kernahan	Carlton	Essendon	2	1993	19.18 (132) drew 20.12 (132)	No score (out on the full)	
David King	North Melbourne	Hawthorn	QF	1994	15.24 (114) d. 13.13 (91) (Note: King's attempt came at the end of regular time, when the scores were locked at North Melbourne 12.19 (91) to Hawthorn 13.13 (91). The Kangaroos added 3.5 (23) to the Hawks' no score in extra time.)	No score (fell short)	
Ben Allan	Fremantle	Footscray	5	1995	14.12 (96) lost to 14.14 (98)	No score (fell short)	
Marcus Picken	Brisbane Lions	Adelaide	9	2001	18.14 (122) lost to 19.13 (127)	No score (fell short)	
Nick Dal Santo	St Kilda	Sydney	5	2002	8.8 (56) drew 8.8 (56)	No score (fell short)	
Jarrad Waite	Carlton	Port Adelaide	4	2005	16.13 (109) drew 15.19 (109)	No score (fell short)	
Matthew Egan	Geelong	Melbourne	20	2005	15.9 (99) lost to 14.16 (100)	Behind	
Daniel Motlop	Port Adelaide	St Kilda	16	2006	8.12 (60) lost to 8.16 (64)	Behind	
Brad Johnson	Western Bulldogs	North Melbourne	9	2008	16.14 (110) lost to 16.17 (113)	Behind	
Jack Riewoldt	Richmond	St Kilda	7	2008	16.11 (107) lost to 17.8 (110)	No score (fell short)	
Brad Johnson	Western Bulldogs	Geelong	9	2009	17.12 (114) lost to 17.14 (116)	Behind	
Nick Riewoldt	St Kilda	Essendon	20	2009	16.12 (108) lost to 16.14 (110)	Behind	
Justin Westhoff	Port Adelaide	Gold Coast	5	2011	15.11 (101) lost to 15.14 (104)	Behind	
Hayden Ballantyne	Fremantle	West Coast	18	2011	9.10 (64) lost to 8.17 (65)	Behind (hit the goal post)	
Adam Goodes	Sydney	Essendon	20	2011	14.15 (99) lost to 15.10 (100)	Behind	
Hamish McIntosh	North Melbourne	Essendon	1	2012	15.12 (102) lost to 14.20 (104)	Behind	
David Mundy	Fremantle	Geelong	20	2014	11.13 (79) lost to 12.9 (81)	Behind	
Tom Lynch	Gold Coast	Melbourne	19	2016	9.10 (64) lost to 9.12 (66)	No score (fell short)	
Isaac Smith	Hawthorn	Geelong	QF	2016	12.11 (83) lost to 12.13 (85)	Behind	
Jayden Hunt	Melbourne	Geelong	1	2018	13.16 (94) lost to 14.13 (97)	No score (fell short)	
Harry Taylor	Geelong	Western Bulldogs	15	2018	15.11 (101) lost to 16.7 (103)	Behind	
David Myers	Essendon	Sydney	8	2019	10.12 (72) lost to 11.11 (77)	No score (fell short)	
Tom McCartin	Sydney	Greater Western Sydney	5	2021	10.9 (69) lost to 9.17 (71)	No score (fell short)	
Adam Kennedy	Greater Western Sydney	North Melbourne	13	2021	14.10 (94) drew 14.10 (94)	No score (fell short)	
Dion Prestia	Richmond	Sydney	11	2022	15.10 (100) lost to 16.10 (106)	No score (fell short)	
Oliver Florent	Sydney	Port Adelaide	4	2023	9.10 (64) lost to 9.12 (66)	No score (fell short)	
Logan McDonald	Sydney	Fremantle	16	2024	14.14 (98) lost to 15.9 (99)	No score (fell short)	
Mitch McGovern	Carlton	Collingwood	21	2024	11.15 (81) lost to 12.12 (84)	No score (out on the full)	
Jack Crisp	Collingwood	Geelong	8	2025	12.15 (87) lost to 13.12 (90)	Behind	
Talor Byrne	Carlton	Collingwood	6	2026	12.11 (83) lost to 13.10 (88)	Behind	
Dylan Moore	Hawthorn	Collingwood	23	2026	13.14 (92) drew 13.14 (92)	No score (fell short)	
Tim Membrey	Collingwood	Western Bulldogs	WF	2026	14.9 (93) lost to 14.12 (96)	Behind	

== Non-premiership matches ==
=== Goal to win ===
Players to have kicked a goal to win a match after the final siren
Player	Club	Opponent	Competition	Rd.	Year	Final score	Ref.
Kerry Good	North Melbourne	Collingwood	Escort Championships	GF	1980	8.9 (57) d. 7.12 (54)	
Jack Riewoldt	Richmond	Hawthorn	NAB Cup	3	2013	0.13.7 (85) d. 0.13.6 (84) (Note: From 2003 to 2017, AFL pre-season matches allowed teams to score nine points for a 'super goal' kicked from beyond the 50-metre arc.)	
Ed Langdon	Fremantle	Collingwood	JLT Community Series	3	2017	1.11.12 (87) d. 1.12.4 (85)	

=== Goal to draw ===
Players to have kicked a goal to draw a match after the final siren
Player	Club	Opponent	Competition	Rd.	Year	Final score	Ref.
Mark Williams	Essendon	St Kilda	NAB Cup	1	2011	0.5.8 (38) drew 0.6.2 (38)	

=== Behind to win ===
Players to have kicked a behind to win a match after the final siren
Player	Club	Opponent	Competition	Rd.	Year	Final score	Ref.
Luke Russell	Gold Coast	Hawthorn	NAB Cup	1	2013	0.4.6 (30) d. 0.4.5 (29)	

== Miscellany ==
There are at least four instances in the elite competition where kicks were taken after the final siren cannot be categorised into the above lists.

In round 2 of the 1911 VFL season, Geelong's Bert Whittington was awarded a free kick moments before the bell was rung in his team's clash against Melbourne. His after-the-bell set shot was touched over the line, which, under the rules of the time, would have resulted in no score as the ball was considered 'dead' as soon as it touched another player's hands. However, as field umpire Lardie Tulloch had not heard the bell, he gave the 'all clear' signal to the goal umpire to signal one behind, resulting in a 54-apiece drawn match. Melbourne protested the result, but it was dismissed by the league.

In round 17 of the 1928 VFL season, St Kilda's Bert Smedley had possession of the ball when timekeepers rang the final bell. However, field umpire Reginald Devine had not yet heard the bell, which allowed Smedley to continue his dash and kick an on-the-run goal that put the Saints one point ahead of opponents Melbourne. After a pitch invasion and minutes of deliberation between match officials and timekeepers, St Kilda was ultimately declared the victor. Melbourne opted to protest the result, recognising that while they had little chance of the protest being upheld, the very notion of challenging the decision would emphasise to the league the importance of louder sounding bells at venues. Following two hours of evidence, the league decided to dismiss the protest, in spite of all witnesses admitting the goal was kicked after the bell, and boundary umpire James Blair describing St Kilda's bell as "putrid".

In the 1990 Foster's Cup – the AFL's pre-season competition – Essendon's Paul Salmon goaled after the siren in his side's quarter-final match against Fitzroy to level the scores at 46-apiece. Seemingly unaware that the fixture was a knockout match, many of the 8,000-strong crowd at Waverley Park invaded the playing surface after Salmon's kick, assuming the match had finished. Rather, the match was to be decided in extra time via two halves of five minutes. Essendon added one goal in the overtime period to win the match by six points and progress to the next round of the tournament.

In round 5 of the 2006 AFL season, St Kilda's Steven Baker was the beneficiary of an after-the-siren free kick awarded in controversial circumstances at the end of his side's match against Fremantle at Aurora Stadium. In a passage of play that occurred after the siren sounded inaudibly, Baker scored a behind to tie the game, and received an illegal bump. He elected to cancel the behind and take a set-shot, which (with the umpires having now heard the siren) was a true after-the-siren kick. He scored another behind, drawing the scores level at 94-apiece. However, four days later, Fremantle successfully challenged to have the result of the game amended to 94–93, reflecting the scoreline when the siren originally sounded. This decision cancelled Baker's kick. This incident has been dubbed 'Sirengate'.

== See also ==
- Fitzroy's Colin Benham's "in-off the small boy" goal (Lake Oval, 30 June 1934)
- Buzzer beater (basketball)
- Last-minute goal (soccer)
- List of Hail Mary passes in American football
