= Bob Bosustow =

Australian rules footballer

Personal information
- Full name: Robert Albert Bosustow
- Born: 8 June 1934
- Died: 28 December 1997 (aged 63)
- Original team: Perth
- Height: 178 cm (5 ft 10 in)
- Weight: 86 kg (190 lb)

Playing career^{1}
Years	Club	Games (Goals)
1955–56	Carlton	20 (4)
- ^{1} Playing statistics correct to the end of 1956.

Robert Albert Bosustow (8 June 1934 – 28 December 1997) was an Australian rules footballer who played with Carlton in the Victorian Football League (VFL).

Born in Perth he was recruited by the Perth Football Club and was seen as a young talent playing on the wing and half back. Bosustow's name was put forward by former Carlton captain Ern Henfry and Carlton signed him . He had a two year career at Carlton playing a total of 20 senior games. He played mainly out of the back pocket, unable to push forward because of club champions of Bruce Comben and John James.

Unable to establish himself as a regular in the Carlton side he accepted an offer to Captain-coach Euroa in the Waranga NE FL for three years (1957-1959). He led the team to back to back premierships, 1957-1958 before missing the finals in 1959. While playing at Euroa he had chronic thigh problems. He then returned to Perth.

Bob played for Kelmscott in the South Suburban Murray Football League in 1961 and remained with the club coaching until 1964.

== Family ==
His son Peter also played for Carlton in the 1980s. His brother in law is Tom Allison and his nephew is Brett Allison.
