= Alan Ryan (disambiguation) =

Alan Ryan (born 1940) is a British professor and lecturer.

Alan Ryan may also refer to:

- Alan Ryan (horror writer) (1943–2011), American author and editor
- Alan Ryan (footballer) (1909–1980), Australian rules footballer
- Alan Ryan, Real IRA member killed in 2012; see Real Irish Republican Army

== See also ==
- Allan Ryan (disambiguation)
