= Robert Mathews =

Robert Mathews may refer to:

- Robert Hamilton Mathews (1841–1918), Australian anthropologist and linguist who studied Australian Aborigines
- Robert Henry Mathews (1877–1970), Australian missionary and sinologist
- Robert Jay Mathews (1953–1984), American neo-Nazi leader
- Robert L. Mathews (c. 1887–1947), American football player and coach
- Bobby Mathews (1851–1898), baseball player
- Bob Mathews (footballer) (1912–1989), Australian rules footballer
- Bobby Mathews (general), Indian Army officer

== See also ==
- Robert Matthews (disambiguation)
- Robert Mathew (1911–1966), British barrister and politician
- Robert Matthew (disambiguation)
