= Keith McKenzie =

Keith McKenzie may refer to:

- Keith McKenzie (American football) (born 1973), former American football linebacker and defensive end
- Keith McKenzie (Australian footballer) (1922–2018), Australian rules footballer
