= Alan Atkinson =

Alan Atkinson may refer to:

- Alan Atkinson (footballer)
- Alan Atkinson (historian)
