= Robert Matthew (disambiguation) =

Robert Matthew or Mathew may refer to:

- Robert Matthew (1906–1975), Scottish architect
- Robert Mathew (1911–1966), British barrister

== See also ==
- Robert Matthew-Walker (born 1939), English composer, writer, editing marketer and broadcaster
- Robert Matthews (disambiguation)
- Robert Mathews (disambiguation)
