= Robert Matthews =

Robert Matthews may refer to:

== Sports ==
- Robert William Matthews (1897–1987), Welsh footballer
- Robert Matthews (athlete) (1961–2018), British paralympic athlete
- Rob Matthews (footballer) (born 1970), English former footballer

== Religion ==
- Robert Matthews (religious figure) (1778–1841), self-styled American prophet
- Robert J. Matthews (1926–2009), LDS religious educator

== Others ==
- Robert Matthews (scientist) (born 1959), British physicist, mathematician, computer scientist and journalist
- Robert Charles Matthews (1871–1952), Canadian politician
- Robert F. Matthews Jr. (1923–2010), American politician
- Robert Jay Mathews (1953–1984), American neo-Nazi leader
- Robert Matthews, recipient of a Pew Fellowship from the Pew Center for Arts & Heritage
- Bob Matthews, a character in 23 Paces to Baker Street

== See also ==
- Robert Mathews (disambiguation)
- Robert Matthew (disambiguation)
