= Allan Ryan =

Allan Ryan may refer to:

- Allan Ryan (attorney) (1945−2023), American attorney
- Allan A. Ryan Jr. (1903−1981), New York Senator and financier

== See also ==
- Alan Ryan (disambiguation)
