= Michael Mitchell (Australian rules footballer) =

Australian rules footballer (born 1961)

Personal information
- Born: 25 November 1961 (age 64)
- Original team: Carnarvon Juniors / Claremont (WAFL)
- Height: 173 cm (5 ft 8 in)
- Weight: 66 kg (146 lb)

Playing career^{1}
Years	Club	Games (Goals)
1982–1986	Claremont	89 (135)
1987–1991	Richmond	81 (103)
Total		170 (238)
- ^{1} Playing statistics correct to the end of 1991.

Career highlights
- All-Australian (with Claremont) 1985, 1986; Sandover Medal 1984; Mark of the Year 1990; Goal of the Year 1990; 100 Tiger Treasures "Goal of the Century"

Michael Mitchell (born 25 November 1961) is an Indigenous former Australian rules footballer for the Claremont Football Club in the West Australian Football League (WAFL) and the Richmond Football Club in the VFL/AFL.

Mitchell was originally from Carnarvon, Western Australia (WA).

== Playing career ==
=== Claremont ===
Mitchell began his senior career with Claremont Football Club in the West Australian Football League. He won the Sandover Medal in 1984 before achieving All-Australian selection in 1985 and 1986.

=== Richmond ===
In May 1986 he signed a three–year contract with Richmond in the Victorian Football League beginning from the 1987 VFL season. He was regarded as one of the most exciting footballers in the VFL of the late 1980s and early 1990s, albeit during poor seasons for Richmond as a club. His play featured pace and a high leap.

In 1990, Mitchell achieved both Mark of the Year and Goal of The Year awards in the same year, becoming, as of 2024, only the second player in the history of the competition to do so (with Carlton's Peter Bosustow pulling off the feat in 1981).

A lightly built player, Mitchell was, however, known as a strong tackler and for his ability to chase down opponents. His career was cut short by several head injuries and concussions sustained during his later playing years.

== Retirement ==
At the end of his AFL career, Mitchell returned to Western Australia.

== Bibliography ==
- Hogan P: The Tigers Of Old, Richmond FC, Melbourne 1996
