= Bill Lewis (footballer, born 1909) =

Australian rules footballer, born 1909

Personal information
- Full name: John Joseph Lewis
- Born: 3 September 1909; Carlton, Victoria
- Died: 3 August 1949 (aged 39); Royal Melbourne Hospital, Parkville, Victoria
- Height: 191 cm (6 ft 3 in)
- Weight: 83 kg (183 lb)

Playing career^{1}
Years	Club	Games (Goals)
1931–32	North Melbourne	4 (0)
- ^{1} Playing statistics correct to the end of 1932.

John Joseph "Bill" Lewis (3 September 1909 – 3 August 1949) was an Australian rules footballer who played with North Melbourne in the Victorian Football League (VFL).

== Family ==
The son of Joseph Lewis, and Mary Agnes Lewis, née Lewis, John Joseph Lewis was born at Carlton, Victoria on 3 September 1909.

His brother, John Francis "Johnny" Lewis (1901–1973), played VFA and VFL football for North Melbourne, and VFL football for Melbourne.

He married Nellie May Ottaway (1912–1986) in 1940.

== Death ==
He died on 3 August 1949 at the Royal Melbourne Hospital in Parkville, Victoria from the head injuries he sustained from an altercation at St Kilda on Saturday, 30 July 1949.
