= Mark of the Year (SANFL) =

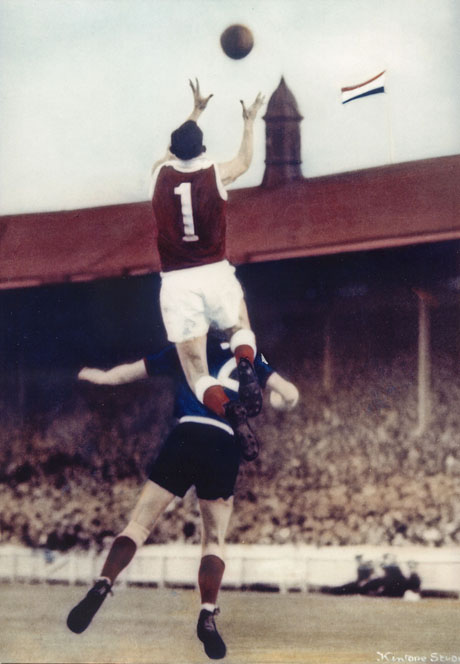
Ian McKay's mark during the 1952 SANFL Grand Final.

The annual South Australian National Football League (SANFL) Mark of the Year competition (currently known for sponsorship reasons as the Skilled Careers Mark of the Year) is a sporting award that celebrates each season's best mark. A mark is the action of a player cleanly catching a kicked ball that has travelled more than 15 metres (49 ft) without the ball hitting the ground.

== Winners ==
Designated Mark of the Year for the SANFL by the Adelaide Advertiser.

Year	Winner	Team
1914	Harold Oliver	Port Adelaide
1952	Ian McKay	North Adelaide
1960	Brian Luke	Port Adelaide
1974	Ken Whelan	Sturt
1980	Michael Farquhar	Glenelg
1989	Rudi Mandemaker	Central Districts
2013	Taite Silverlock	West Adelaide
2015	Taite Silverlock	West Adelaide
2017	Lewis Hender	North Adelaide
2018	Jono Beech	West Adelaide
2020	Lachie Jones	Woodville-West Torrens
2021	Cameron Craig	North Adelaide

== See also ==
- Spectacular mark
- Mark of the Year
