= Jared Poulton =

Australian rules footballer

Personal information
- Born: 21 April 1977 (age 49)
- Original team: Port Adelaide Magpies (SANFL)
- Debut: Round 1, 28 March 1999, Port Adelaide vs. Sydney Swans, at Sydney Cricket Ground

Playing career^{1}
Years	Club	Games (Goals)
1999–2005	Port Adelaide	88 (20)
- ^{1} Playing statistics correct to the end of 2005.

Jared Poulton (born 21 April 1977) is a former Australian rules footballer in the Australian Football League.

Debuting with the Port Adelaide Football Club in 1999, he was noted as an impact player and when Port was playing well in 2004. Poulton cemented his spot in the side until a hamstring injury led him to miss the finals series of that year and ultimately, a premiership win.

In 2002, Poulton became the 35th player in VFL/AFL history to kick a winning goal after the siren, against the Sydney Swans.

Poulton retired in 2005 after playing just one game for the year, with 88 games to his credit.

After that he went back to the SANFL to play for the Port Adelaide Magpies alongside fellow Power teammate Byron Pickett.
