= Mark of the Year =

Australian Football League award

- Awarded for: The best mark taken each season in the Australian Football League
- Sponsored by: Four'N Twenty
- Country: Australia
- Presented by: Australian Football League
- First award: 2001
- Currently held by: Nick Watson
- Website: afl.com.au/mark-of-the-year
- Related: Goal of the Year

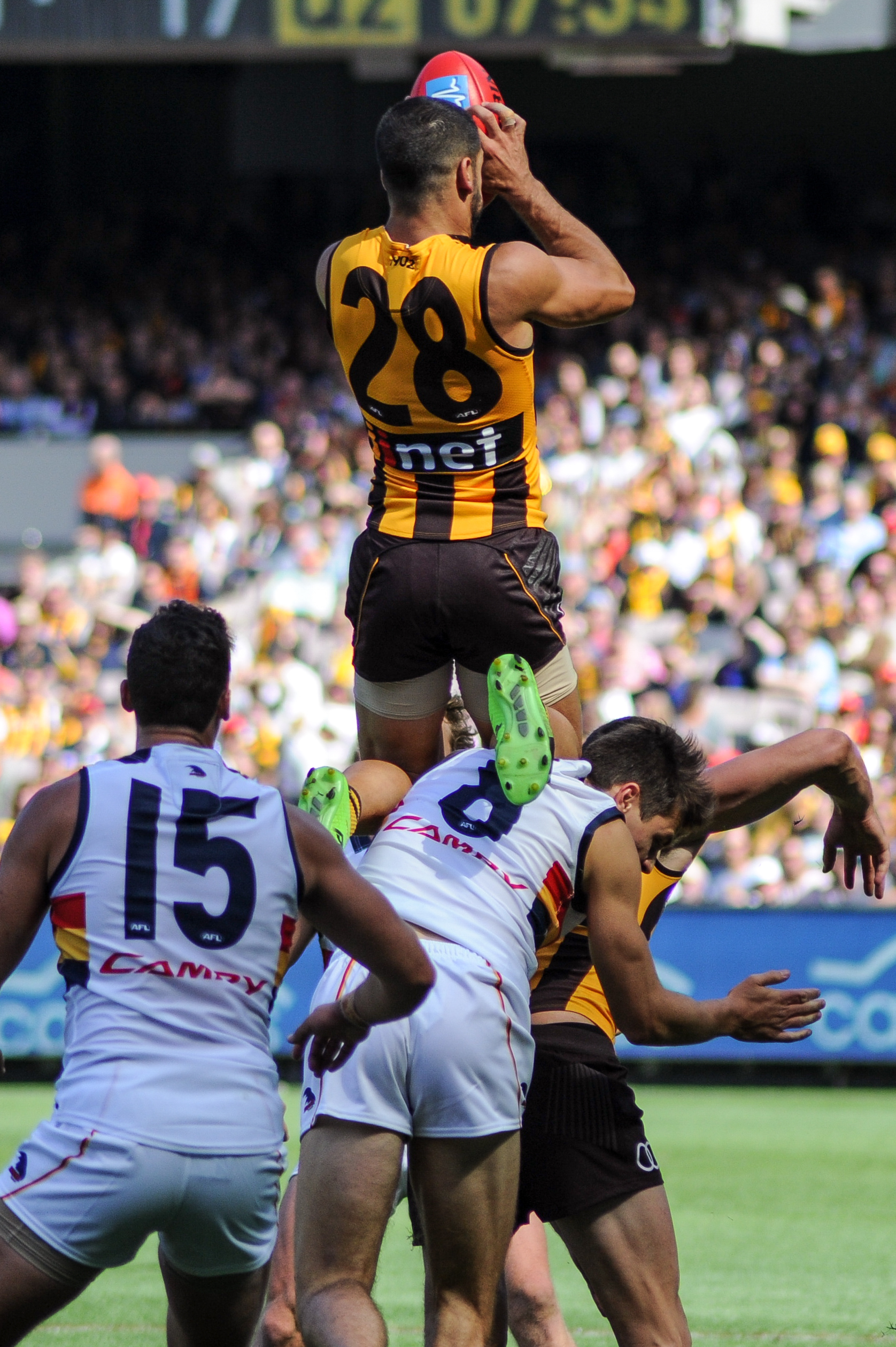
Marks where one player jumps upon another's back for height – known as "spectacular marks" – are often named Mark of the Year.

In Australian rules football, a player can take a mark by catching the ball from a kick, which earns protection from tackles. In the Australian Football League (AFL), the mark subjectively judged the best in each season is named Mark of the Year.

The award is almost always given to spectacular marks – those where one player jumps upon another's back to reach the ball. Although there are no formal rules prescribing what a good mark is, some important factors are how high the player leaps, how long he stays in the air, whether his catch is clean, whether he catches the ball with extended arms, and how dramatic his fall is.

The competition was inspired by a famous mark taken by Carlton's Alex Jesaulenko in the 1970 VFL grand final. Following Jesaulenko's mark, two football television shows – Channel Seven's World of Sport and The Winners on the ABC – began awarding the title "mark of the year" to the best marks as judged by their panels of football experts. The two shows would often choose different winners. Seven's award was more prestigious because the winning player received a car, but the ABC's edition only bestowed lesser prizes like mugs and bicycles – a disparity bemoaned by several players who only won the latter.

The award is run in conjunction with the Goal of the Year contest, which recognises the best goal kicked during an AFL season. Two players have won both the mark and goal awards in the same season: Peter Bosustow (1981) and Michael Mitchell (1990).

== History ==
The competition was initiated following Alex Jesaulenko's mark over Graeme "Jerker" Jenkin in the 1970 VFL Grand Final; the medal awarded to the winner now bears his name. During the 1970s and early 1980s, the award was decided by a panel of football experts on Seven's World of Sport. During the 1980s and 1990s, the winning mark was determined by selected football journalists and experts. With minor modifications, the current selection process was first used in the 1998 season.

In 2001, the AFL itself began operating an official Mark of the Year award in competition with Seven, which became the more prominent award. Certain sources, like the AFL Record Season Guide, only acknowledge these official winners as having taken Marks of the Year. Chris Tarrant's mark in Round 10, 2001, was previously used as the basis of the silhouette for the Mark of the Year logo despite, ironically, being beaten to the honour by Gary Moorcroft's Round 14 mark, considered by many to be one of the best marks of all time.

== Eligibility and prizes ==
The competition is open to players in the AFL, Australian rules football's highest league. As of 2024, winners receive a prize of A$50,000 in cash, a $10,000 donation to their junior club, two million Velocity Points for air travel (valued at approximately $40,000–$80,000 depending on how they are used), and the Alex Jesaulenko Medal. The prizes are sponsored by National Australia Bank and Virgin Australia.

For the majority of the competition's existence, the overall winner has been rewarded with a car, typically the model of whichever auto manufacturer was sponsoring the award at the time. In 1983, Carlton's Ken Hunter won a Holden Commodore SL/X for his mark of the year. The following year's winner, Sydney's Wayne Carroll, scored a Nissan Bluebird TRX for his effort. Richmond's Michael Mitchell received a Ford Laser in 1990 for his win following a phone-in poll that attracted 250,000 callers. Throughout Toyota Australia's sponsorship of the competition in the mid-2000s, players were often granted use of the latest Toyota vehicle (such as the Kluger or Aurion) for 12 months, alongside a $5,000 donation to their grassroots club.

Such is the ongoing public association between taking mark of the year and winning "the car", multiple players have believed such a prize was still awarded more than a decade after its cessation.

== Selection process ==
After each round of the regular AFL season, three "mark of the week" nominations are selected by the AFL. Members of the public are then invited to vote for a weekly winner on the AFL website. Weekly polls can occasionally be subject to vote brigading by supporters of larger clubs, which has led to highly favoured marks being overlooked for the weekly prize by more underwhelming nominations. Under the current sponsorship arrangement with Four'n Twenty, weekly voters go in the draw to win $5,000, a pie warmer and a year's worth of meat pies.

After the regular season's end, the title is given to a single mark; at times, the eligibility process has extended into the finals series. The potential winner is not restricted to players who won mark of the week; indeed, in 2010, the two favourites both came in round 21, and although the public voted Brendon Goddard as mark of the week, the selection panel named Liam Jurrah as mark of the year. As of 2023, the AFL game analysis committee selects the three finalists from a list of 29 (the 24 weekly winners, plus five additional marks selected by AFL Media) based on a 5–4–3–2–1 vote given by each member of the committee.

The overall winner, currently announced on Brownlow Medal night, is then determined by a combination of committee voting (counted for 10 votes) and public voting (counted for one vote). At one stage, the overall winner was determined purely by the public, which led to widespread outrage in 2017 when Essendon's Joe Daniher took out the title over a mark taken by Collingwood's Jeremy Howe, which many deemed to be one of the greatest of all time. Howe's manager at the time claimed that his player lost up to $40,000 in endorsements and image rights based on the unexpected loss. The league amended the voting process following the public debate.

=== Debate surrounding finals exclusion ===
Because the award is traditionally awarded on Brownlow Medal night, which takes place on the Monday before the AFL grand final, the award for both Goal and Mark of the Year is not currently considered for marks and goals taken during the finals series, although this hasn't always been the case. This drew the ire of the press and fans alike in 2024 when Isaac Heeney was ineligible for the Mark of the Year in what is considered one of the greatest marks of all time, which he took in a qualifying final; similar complaints have been made regarding exceptional finals goals for the Goal of the Year counterpart. Ironically, the Alex Jesaulenko Medal itself was inspired by a famous mark he took in the 1970 VFL Grand Final, which, under the current rules, would not have been eligible for the award (had it existed at the time).

== VFL/AFL winners ==
=== Official recipients ===
Table of winners
| Year | Winner | Club | Opposition | Rd. | Venue |
|---|---|---|---|---|---|
| 2001 | Gary Moorcroft | Essendon | Western Bulldogs | 14 | Docklands Stadium |
| 2002 | Jonathan Brown | Brisbane | Hawthorn | 17 | Melbourne Cricket Ground |
| 2003 | Chris Tarrant | Collingwood | Geelong | 18 | Docklands Stadium |
| 2004 | Ashley Sampi | West Coast | Melbourne | 7 | Melbourne Cricket Ground |
| 2005 | Luke McPharlin | Fremantle | West Coast | 3 | Subiaco Oval |
| 2006 | Brad Ottens | Geelong | Sydney | 5 | Stadium Australia |
| 2007 | Michael Newton | Melbourne | Kangaroos | 17 | Docklands Stadium |
| 2008 | Matthew Lloyd | Essendon | Melbourne | 18 | Melbourne Cricket Ground |
| 2009 | Brett Burton | Adelaide | Carlton | 22 | Docklands Stadium |
| 2010 | Liam Jurrah | Melbourne | Port Adelaide | 21 | Football Park |
| 2011 | Andrew Krakouer | Collingwood | Adelaide | 9 | Docklands Stadium |
| 2012 | Jeremy Howe | Melbourne | Sydney | 8 | Sydney Cricket Ground |
| 2013 | Jamie Elliott | Collingwood | Port Adelaide | 14 | Football Park |
| 2014 | Chad Wingard | Port Adelaide | St Kilda | 12 | Adelaide Oval |
| 2015 | Nic Naitanui | West Coast | Geelong | 9 | Subiaco Oval |
| 2016 | Majak Daw | North Melbourne | Collingwood | 18 | Docklands Stadium |
| 2017 | Joe Daniher | Essendon | St Kilda | 17 | Docklands Stadium |
| 2018 | Isaac Heeney | Sydney | Melbourne | 21 | Melbourne Cricket Ground |
| 2019 | Liam Ryan | West Coast | Melbourne | 9 | Perth Stadium |
| 2020 | Sam Walsh | Carlton | Port Adelaide | 7 | The Gabba |
| 2021 | Shai Bolton | Richmond | Geelong | 8 | Melbourne Cricket Ground |
| 2022 | Mitch Georgiades | Port Adelaide | Fremantle | 16 | Perth Stadium |
| 2023 | Harry Himmelberg | Greater Western Sydney | Adelaide | 1 | Sydney Showground Stadium |
| 2024 | Bobby Hill | Collingwood | North Melbourne | 14 | Docklands Stadium |
| 2025 | Sam Darcy | Western Bulldogs | Melbourne | 22 | Melbourne Cricket Ground |
| 2026 | Nick Watson | Hawthorn | West Coast | 24 | Perth Stadium |

=== Channel Seven and ABC recipients ===
Table of winners
| Year | Winner | Club | Opposition | Rd. | Venue | Ref. |
|---|---|---|---|---|---|---|
| 1970 | Alex Jeasualenko (Seven) | Carlton | Collingwood | GF | MCG | |
| 1971 | Peter Knights (1) (Seven) | Hawthorn | | | | |
| 1972 | Peter Knights (2) (Seven) | Hawthorn | Footscray | | | |
| 1973 | Alan Atkinson (Seven) | Collingwood | Hawthorn | 21 | Waverley Park | |
| 1974 | Billy Picken (1) (Seven) | Collingwood | Richmond | 9 | Melbourne Cricket Ground | |
| 1975 | Peter Knights (3) (Seven) | Hawthorn | Carlton | | Princes Park | |
| 1976 | Billy Picken (2) (Seven) | Collingwood | St Kilda | 16 | Victoria Park | |
| 1977 | Trevor Barker (1) (Seven) | St Kilda | South Melbourne | | | |
| 1978 | Peter Moore (Seven) | Collingwood | Carlton | 18 | Princes Park | |
| 1979 | Trevor Barker (Seven) | St Kilda | Essendon | | | |
| 1979 | Michael Roach (ABC) | Richmond | Hawthorn | 5 | Melbourne Cricket Ground | |
| 1980 | Alex Jesaulenko (ABC) | St Kilda | Essendon | 4 | Moorabbin Oval | |
| 1981 | Peter Bosustow (Seven) | Carlton | Geelong | 18 | Princes Park | |
| 1981 | Ricky Barham (ABC) | Collingwood | Essendon | 18 | MCG | |
| 1982 | Geoff Raines (Seven) | Richmond | Fitzroy | 2 | Melbourne Cricket Ground | |
| 1982 | Geoff Raines (ABC) | Richmond | Fitzroy | 2 | Melbourne Cricket Ground | |
| 1983 | Ken Hunter (Seven) | Carlton | Richmond | 1 | Princes Park | |
| 1983 | Peter Bosustow (ABC) | Carlton | Collingwood | 3 | Waverley Park | |
| 1984 | Wayne Carroll (Seven) | Sydney | Footscray | 16 | Sydney Cricket Ground | |
| 1984 | Denis Banks (ABC) | Collingwood | Footscray | 10 | Western Oval | |
| 1985 | Gary Ablett, Sr. | Geelong | North Melbourne | 5 | Kardinia Park | |
| 1985 | Peter Knights (4) (ABC) | Hawthorn | Carlton | 10 | Princes Park | |
| 1986 | Tony Morwood (Seven) | Sydney | Fitzroy | SF | Melbourne Cricket Ground | |
| 1986 | Alan Ezard (ABC) | Essendon | Carlton | 5 | Waverley Park | |
| 1987 | Warwick Capper (ABC) | Sydney | North Melbourne | 10 | Sydney Cricket Ground | |
| 1988 | Stephen Silvagni | Carlton | Collingwood | 14 | Melbourne Cricket Ground | |
| 1989 | Alastair Lynch | Fitzroy | North Melbourne | 16 | Melbourne Cricket Ground | |
| 1990 | Michael Mitchell | Richmond | Fitzroy | 5 | Melbourne Cricket Ground | |
| 1991 | Brett Allison | North Melbourne | Collingwood | 11 | Melbourne Cricket Ground | |
| 1992 | Nicky Winmar | St Kilda | Essendon | 16 | Melbourne Cricket Ground | |
| 1993 | Tony Modra | Adelaide | North Melbourne | 8 | Football Park | |
| 1994 | Gary Ablett, Sr. (2) | Geelong | Collingwood | 7 | Melbourne Cricket Ground | |
| 1995 | Shaun Smith | Melbourne | Brisbane Lions | 22 | The Gabba | |
| 1996 | Ben Hart | Adelaide | St Kilda | 8 | Football Park | |
| 1997 | Tony Modra (2) | Adelaide | North Melbourne | 17 | Football Park | |
| 1998 | Winston Abraham | North Melbourne | Port Adelaide | 18 | Manuka Oval | |
| 1999 | Matthew Lappin | Carlton | Essendon | 1 | Melbourne Cricket Ground | |
| 2000 | Tony Modra (3) | Fremantle | Geelong | 1 | Subiaco Oval | |

== AFL Women's winners ==
=== Official recipients ===
Table of winners
| Year | Winner | Club | Opposition | Rd. | Venue |
|---|---|---|---|---|---|
| 2017 | Darcy Vescio | Carlton | Western Bulldogs | 5 | Princes Park |
| 2018 | Tayla Harris | Carlton | Collingwood | 1 | Princes Park |
| 2019 | Tayla Harris (2) | Carlton | Brisbane | 6 | Princes Park |
| 2020 | Rebecca Privitelli | Greater Western Sydney | Gold Coast | 1 | Blacktown ISP Oval |
| 2021 | Danielle Ponter | Adelaide | Western Bulldogs | 8 | Norwood Oval |
| 2022 (S6) | Tahlia Randall | North Melbourne | Western Bulldogs | 3 | Arden Street Oval |
| 2022 (S7) | Chloe Scheer | Geelong | North Melbourne | 4 | York Park |
| 2023 | Courtney Hodder | Brisbane | Gold Coast | 7 | Carrara Stadium |
| 2025 | Sarah Hosking | Richmond | Collingwood | 10 | Victoria Park |

== Similar competitions ==
State leagues such as the South Australian National Football League and the West Australian Football League hold their own mark of the year competitions each season, with public voting determining the overall winner. Many other semi-professional and amateur Australian rules football leagues also run an equivalent competition, with the increasing prevalence of league-wide web broadcasting allowing for a more comprehensive nomination process. Nation-wide promotions are also intermittently run, encouraging local footballers of all age groups to submit their home videos.
