= Alan Atkinson (footballer) =

Australian rules footballer, born 1951

Personal information
- Born: 20 October 1951 (age 75)
- Original team: Hamilton

Playing career^{1}
Years	Club	Games (Goals)
1970–1978	Collingwood	134 (49)
1980	Footscray	6 (3)
Total		140 (52)
- ^{1} Playing statistics correct to the end of 1980.

Alan Atkinson (born 20 October 1951) is a former Australian rules footballer who played in the Victorian Football League (VFL).

Atkinson was recruited by Collingwood from Hamilton, and made his debut in 1970. Despite playing 134 games for the Pies, Atkinson failed to make a Grand Final appearance when opportunities arose. He was tall, but not a solidly built player. He played on the wing and at half-forward during his career. In round 21 of the 1973 season, he took one of the most spectacular marks of all time, which was awarded "VFL Mark of the Year". In 1980 he played six games when the Bulldogs picked him up.
