= Doug Farrant =

Australian rules footballer

Personal information
- Full name: Douglas Ian Farrant
- Born: 2 April 1949 (age 77)
- Original team: Cohuna
- Height: 189 cm (6 ft 2 in)
- Weight: 91 kg (201 lb)

Playing career^{1}
Years	Club	Games (Goals)
1968–1973	North Melbourne	70 (110)
1974–1979	Perth	119 (181)
- ^{1} Playing statistics correct to the end of 1979.

Douglas Ian Farrant (born 2 April 1949) is a former Australian rules footballer who played with North Melbourne Football Club in the Victorian Football League (VFL) and Perth in the Western Australian National Football League (WANFL).

Farrant, a Cohuna recruit, was the full-forward in North Melbourne's 1967 reserves premiership. He topped North Melbourne's goal-kicking in 1968 with 35 goals. His brother, Gary Farrant, finished second.

He was traded to Perth at the end of the 1973 VFL season, one of four players who headed west so that North Melbourne could secure Barry Cable. Just as he had done for North Melbourne, Farrant was the leading goal-kicker at Perth in his first season, with 55 goals. He was a member of Perth's 1976 and 1977 premiership sides.
