= Gary Farrant =

Australian rules footballer

Personal information
- Full name: Gary Farrant
- Born: 7 September 1946 (age 80)
- Original team: Cohuna
- Height: 183 cm (6 ft 0 in)
- Weight: 80 kg (176 lb)

Playing career^{1}
Years	Club	Games (Goals)
1967–1975	North Melbourne	138 (88)
- ^{1} Playing statistics correct to the end of 1975.

Career highlights
- VFL premiership player: 1975

Gary Farrant (born 7 September 1946) is a former Australian rules footballer for North Melbourne Football Club and was a regular defender during the late 1960s until 1971.

During 1972 he went back to his home club Cohuna Football Club and also return to his farming commitments. However, he was persuaded by Ron Barassi to come back to the club and returned to the club in 1973. Gary Farrant was a member of North Melbourne's first VFL Premiership, where he played at centre half back. This was his final year at North Melbourne. He also had a brother Doug Farrant, who was a forward at North Melbourne.
