= Stan Thomas (coach) =

Australian rules footballer

Stan Thomas MBE JP

Personal information
- Full name: Stanley Claude Thomas
- Born: July 1893; Ballarat
- Died: 5 September 1974 (aged 81); Hampton
- Original team: North Melb (VFA)
- Position: Half Back

Playing career
Years	Club	Games (Goals)
1922–24	North Melbourne (VFA)	4 (0)

Coaching career
Years	Club	Games (W–L–D)
1926	North Melbourne	1 (0–1–0)

Stanley Claude Thomas ( July 1893 – 5 September 1974) was an Australian football administrator who coached North Melbourne to one senior game in 1926 after their inaugural coach Wels Eicke resigned mid-season.

== Early life ==
Thomas was born in Ballarat and moved to Melbourne where he had employment with the Victorian Railways as a fitter and turner. A keen sportsman, especially athletics Thomas played some football with the junior clubs in the inner suburbs of Melbourne. He played with North Juniors before trying his luck at Williamstown.

He enlisted with the army in 1916 and was sent to fight in France. He had a bout in hospital suffering from illness and returned to Australia in 1919. As an athlete he won the Korumburra Gift and was responsible for founding the Footscray Harriers.

Thomas played for North Melbourne in the Victorian Football Association. He had an interest with off field administration, North saw potential and in 1922 he was made Vice President. When the club transferred to the VFL, Thomas was the club secretary.

== Coaching ==
After three disappointing team efforts Wels Eicke resigned from the position as coach. The decision was sudden enough to catch the administration on the hop. Club secretary Stan Thomas coached the club at short notice. The team had to an 8-point loss against Geelong at Arden St. The following week the club appointed Gerry Donnelly as Captain Coach for the rest of the year.

== Administration ==
Thomas spent five years as secretary before resigning. In 1931 he was elected secretary of the Footscray Football Club. He was known for his organising ability. Thomas did not sort re-election for 1935.

== Awards ==
Stan was made a life member of the North Melbourne Football Club, and he was appointed MBE in 1960 for "services to ex-servicemen". He was also a justice of the peace.

== Death ==
Stan died at home in Hampton in 1974. He was cremated and interred at Springvale Botanical Cemetery.
