= Neil Doolan =

Australian rules footballer and coach

Personal information
- Born: 27 January 1933
- Died: 22 December 2012 (aged 79)
- Original team: Happy Valley
- Height: 178 cm (5 ft 10 in)
- Weight: 70 kg (154 lb)

Playing career^{1}
Years	Club	Games (Goals)
1951–1960	North Melbourne	103 (18)
- ^{1} Playing statistics correct to the end of 1960.

Neil Doolan (27 January 1933 – 22 December 2012) was an Australian rules footballer who played with North Melbourne in the Victorian Football League (VFL).

Doolan played as both a wingman and centreman during his career, first appearing for North Melbourne in the 1951 season. He played most of that year however in the reserves competition and won the Gardiner Medal for the league's best and fairest player. Doolan represented Victoria twice at interstate football.
