= Tom Allison (Australian footballer) =

Australian rules footballer (born 1944)

Personal information
- Born: 29 February 1944 (age 82)
- Original team: West Coburg
- Height: 175 cm (5 ft 9 in)
- Weight: 72 kg (159 lb)

Playing career^{1}
Years	Club	Games (Goals)
1963–1970	North Melbourne	106 (61)

Representative team honours^{2}
Years	Team	Games (Goals)
1965	Victoria	1 (?)
- ^{1} Playing statistics correct to the end of 1970.^{2} Representative statistics correct as of 1965.

Tom Allison (born 29 February 1944) is a former Australian rules footballer who played for North Melbourne Football Club in the Victorian Football League (VFL). He played 106 games and kicked 61 goals for North Melbourne between 1963 and 1970.

Allison was recruited from West Coburg and played one match for Victoria in 1965. After his retirement, Allison became captain-coach of Canberra Australian National Football League side Belconnen and also played for and coached the Australian Capital Territory. He attended St Kevin's College, Melbourne.

Allison's son Brett also played for North Melbourne. Tom Alison is also the uncle of Peter Bosustow
