= Stewart Anderson (footballer) =

Australian rules footballer, born 1911

Personal information
- Full name: Glen Stewart Anderson
- Born: 1910
- Died: 7 August 1962 (aged 51–52)
- Original team: Hamilton
- Height: 180 cm (5 ft 11 in)
- Weight: 74 kg (163 lb)

Playing career^{1}
| Years | Club | Games (Goals) |
| 1933–1935 | St Kilda | 20 (21) |
| 1937–1938 | North Melbourne | 14 (20) |
| Total | | 34 (41) |
- ^{1} Playing statistics correct to the end of 1938.

Glen Stewart Anderson (1910 – 7 August 1962) was an Australian rules footballer who played with St Kilda and North Melbourne in the Victorian Football League (VFL).

Anderson spent three seasons at St Kilda, after arriving to the club from Hamilton. He spent the 1936 season as playing coach of Oakleigh, in the Victorian Football Association. Cleared to North Melbourne, Anderson kicked 18 goals in 1937, all from his opening five games of the year. It was enough to see him finish as the season's leading goal-kicker for North Melbourne. His tally remains the equal lowest in the club's history to win the goal-kicking award, having been equaled by Cameron Zurhaar during the 2020 season over 80 years later.
