= John Brady (footballer) =

Australian rules footballer (1932–2022)

Personal information
- Born: 20 February 1932
- Died: 4 October 2022 (aged 90)
- Original teams: Benalla, Shepparton (GVFL)
- Height: 185 cm (6 ft 1 in)
- Weight: 83 kg (183 lb)

Playing career^{1}
Years	Club	Games (Goals)
1952–1959	North Melbourne	118 (44)
- ^{1} Playing statistics correct to the end of 1959.

John Brady (20 February 1932 – 4 October 2022) was an Australian rules footballer who played with North Melbourne in the VFL during the 1950s, after being signed by them in 1952 from the Benalla Football Club.

Brady was originally from Wangaratta and played with Imperials Football Club in the Wangaratta Junior Football League, prior to moving to Benalla with his family.

A key position player, Brady was North Melbourne's Syd Barker Medalist in 1954 and placed equal fourth in that year's Brownlow Medal count. He captained North from 1957 to his retirement at the end of the 1959 season. During his career he also represented Victoria at interstate football.

After a year at Ararat, Brady returned to Shepparton as captain-coach of City United and led them to the 1962 Goulburn Valley Football League premiership.
