= Alan Ryan (footballer) =

Australian rules footballer, born 1911

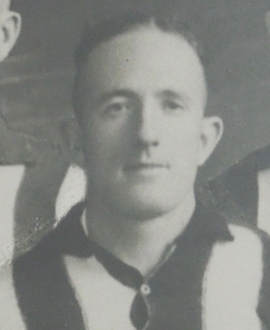
- Ryan during his time at Collingwood

Personal information
- Full name: Alan James Ryan
- Nicknames: Ginger, Mick
- Born: 3 June 1911
- Died: 26 October 1980 (aged 69)
- Original team: Preston (VFA)
- Height: 178 cm (5 ft 10 in)
- Weight: 79 kg (174 lb)

Playing career^{1}
Years	Club	Games (Goals)
1932–1933	Melbourne	13 (0)
1934–1938	Collingwood	29 (5)
Total		42 (5)
- ^{1} Playing statistics correct to the end of 1938.

Alan James Ryan (3 June 1911 – 26 October 1980) was an Australian rules footballer who played with Melbourne and Collingwood in the Victorian Football League (VFL).

In a match for Collingwood against Fitzroy Football Club in 1935, Ryan had to kick for goal from 35 metres out after the final siren with Collingwood trailing by six points (a goal would draw the match). Hundreds of spectators ran onto the ground while Ryan was lining up for goal and just as he was about to kick, a police trooper on horseback rode in front of Ryan, startling him. The horse reared but Ryan was still able to clear the trooper to kick the goal.

In 1939 Ryan was cleared to play for Brunswick in the Victorian Football Association.

== Sources ==
- Atkinson, G. (1982). Everything you ever wanted to know about Australian rules football but couldn't be bothered asking. The Five Mile Press: Melbourne. ISBN 0 86788 009 0.
