= Cameron Zurhaar =

Australian rules footballer

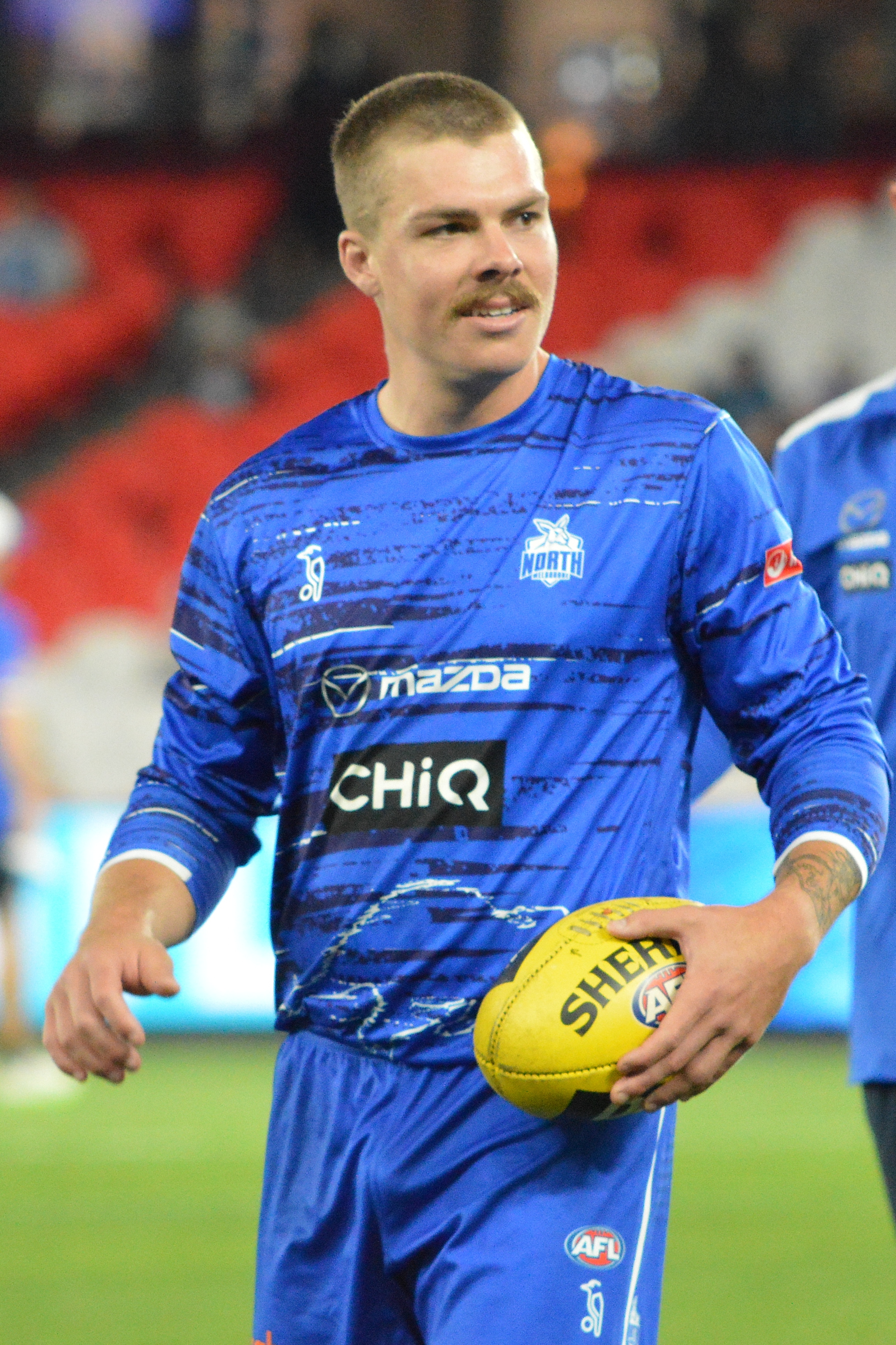
- Zurhaar in March 2026

Personal information
- Full name: Cameron Zurhaar
- Nicknames: Bull, Cam
- Born: 22 May 1998 (age 28)
- Original team: East Fremantle (WAFL)/Wesley College (PSA)
- Draft: No. 11, 2017 rookie draft
- Debut: Round 17, 2017, North Melbourne vs. Port Adelaide, at Adelaide Oval
- Height: 190 cm (6 ft 3 in)
- Weight: 96 kg (212 lb)
- Position: Forward/Defender

Club information
- Current club: North Melbourne
- Number: 44

Playing career^{1}
Years	Club	Games (Goals)
2017–	North Melbourne	164 (208)
- ^{1} Playing statistics correct to the end of round 22, 2026.

Career highlights
- North Melbourne leading goalkicker: 2020; AFL Rising Star nominee: 2019; 22under22 team: 2019

Cameron Zurhaar (born 22 May 1998) is a professional Australian rules footballer playing for the North Melbourne Football Club in the Australian Football League.

== Early life ==
Zurhaar grew up in Perth, the son of Perth businessman Stephen Zurhaar. He attended school at Wesley College in South Perth and played junior football for Melville Hawks, part of the East Fremantle junior district.

His surname is of Dutch origin.

== AFL career ==
Zurhaar was drafted by North Melbourne with its first selection and eleventh overall in the 2017 rookie draft. He made his debut against Port Adelaide at Adelaide Oval in round 17 of the 2017 season.

In a Round 7 win over Carlton in 2019, Zurhaar kicked a game-high 5 goals en route to winning the Round 7 Rising Star nomination. He finished his third season at the Kangaroos having kicked 26 goals across 19 games in a breakout season. His nickname amongst the North Melbourne supporter base is the 'Bull', a reference to his ferocious attack on the football.

Zurhaar was North Melbourne's leading goalkicker for the COVID-19 affected 2020 AFL season kicking 18 goals across 16 games. His 18 goals remains the equal lowest tally to win North's leading goalkicker award, tying with Stewart Anderson's record set in 1937.

Round 18 of the 2022 AFL season saw Zurhaar kick a career high six goals during North Melbourne's four-point win over Richmond. He kicked his 100th AFL goal in the same match.

In July 2024, Zurhaar signed a five-year contract extension, keeping him at North Melbourne until at least the end of 2029.

Zurhaar kicked a goal after the final siren to win the game for North Melbourne against Gold Coast in round 11, 2026, capping off a 43-point comeback for his team.

== Personal life ==
Zurhaar is a hobby chef and outside of football runs popular Instagram page ‘Bull’s Cooking.’

== Statistics ==
Updated to the end of round 22, 2026.

Legend
G	Goals	K	Kicks	D	Disposals	T	Tackles
B	Behinds	H	Handballs	M	Marks

Season	Team	No.	Games	Totals							Averages (per game)							Votes
Season	Team	No.	Games	G	B	K	H	D	M	T	G	B	K	H	D	M	T	Votes
2017	North Melbourne	44	4	2	3	22	14	36	9	7	0.5	0.8	5.5	3.5	9.0	2.3	1.8	0
2018	North Melbourne	44	5	2	5	30	22	52	5	14	0.4	1.0	6.0	4.4	10.4	1.0	2.8	0
2019	North Melbourne	44	19	26	12	138	98	236	78	62	1.4	0.6	7.3	5.2	12.4	4.1	3.3	6
2020 (Note: The 2020 season was played with 17 home-and-away matches per team (down from 22) and 16-minute quarters with time on (down from 20-minute quarters with time on) due to the impact of the COVID-19 pandemic.)	North Melbourne	44	16	18	11	102	53	155	46	39	1.1	0.7	6.4	3.3	9.7	2.9	2.4	0
2021	North Melbourne	44	20	31	23	163	72	235	75	58	1.6	1.2	8.2	3.6	11.8	3.8	2.9	1
2022	North Melbourne	44	19	34	26	155	71	226	72	31	1.8	1.4	8.2	3.7	11.9	3.8	1.6	3
2023	North Melbourne	44	16	20	19	159	99	258	39	36	1.3	1.2	9.9	6.2	16.1	2.4	2.3	2
2024	North Melbourne	44	22	29	18	187	123	310	89	61	1.3	0.8	8.5	5.6	14.1	4.0	2.8	1
2025	North Melbourne	44	22	38	24	168	64	232	85	47	1.7	1.1	7.6	2.9	10.5	3.9	2.1	1
2026	North Melbourne	44	21	8	11	205	109	314	117	33	0.4	0.5	9.8	5.2	15.0	5.6	1.6	0
Career			164	208	152	1329	725	2054	615	388	1.3	0.9	8.1	4.4	12.5	3.8	2.4	14
