= Danielle Laidley =

Australian rules footballer, born 1967

Personal information
- Born: 27 March 1967 (age 59)
- Original team: West Perth (WAFL)
- Debut: Round 1, 29 March 1987, West Coast vs. Richmond, at Subiaco Oval
- Position: Half-back

Playing career^{1}
| Years | Club | Games (Goals) |
| 1984–1992 | West Perth | 70 (22) |
| 1987–1992 | West Coast | 52 (11) |
| 1993–1997 | North Melbourne | 99 (4) |
| Total | | 221 (37) |

Representative team honours^{2}
| Years | Team | Games (Goals) |
| 1988, 1996 | Western Australia | 2 (0) |

Coaching career^{3}
| Years | Club | Games (W–L–D) |
| 2003–2009 | North Melbourne | 149 (72–75–2) |
- ^{1} Playing statistics correct to the end of 1997.^{2} Representative statistics correct as of 1996.^{3} Coaching statistics correct as of 2010.

Career highlights
- North Melbourne premiership player: 1996 AFL Grand Final; Western Australia state of origin representative 1996, 1998

Danielle May Laidley (born Dean James Laidley; 27 March 1967) is a former Australian rules football coach and player, who played for the West Coast Eagles and North Melbourne in the Australian Football League (AFL) from 1987 to 1997, including in North Melbourne's 1996 premiership team, and was coach of North Melbourne from 2003 to 2009.

In May 2020, Laidley was outed as transgender after a police officer leaked photographs of her in police custody.

== Early life ==
Laidley was born on 27 March 1967 as Dean Laidley and grew up in Balga, Western Australia, a working-class northern suburb of Perth.

Lightly built, Laidley first played senior football at the West Perth Football Club in the West Australian Football League, and was recruited to be part of the West Coast Eagles' inaugural VFL squad in 1987.

== VFL/AFL playing career ==
=== West Coast Eagles (1987–1992) ===
Laidley made her VFL debut for the West Coast Eagles in Round 1, 1987, against Richmond at Subiaco Oval. As an aggressive half-back line player and known as "The Junkyard Dog", Laidley was known for her commitment to the contest and to winning the ball. Her career suffered a major setback during the 1990 season when she required a knee reconstruction and found it hard to break back into the team, missing West Coast's 1992 premiership win.

Laidley played a total of 52 games and kicked 11 goals for West Coast Eagles from 1987 until 1992.

=== North Melbourne (1993–1997) ===
At the end of 1992, Laidley was traded to North Melbourne. A trademark of her play was the execution of the strategy of either kicking out or receiving uncontested a short kick-out to the back pocket, a strategy which was later widely adopted by other clubs. Laidley was also part of the North Melbourne premiership side in 1996.

Laidley played a total of 99 games and kicked 4 goals for North Melbourne from 1993 until 1997.

== Coaching career ==
=== Early career (1998–2002) ===
After retiring from the AFL, Laidley took up coaching, beginning with the Weston Creek team in the AFL Canberra competition.

Her first AFL coaching role was with Collingwood as an assistant coach under Mick Malthouse, where she was involved in the club's 2002 AFL Grand Final loss.

=== North Melbourne (2003–2009) ===
After the resignation of Denis Pagan as senior coach, Laidley was recruited as the senior coach of the Kangaroos for the 2003 season. In her first two years, the team finished 10th. She coached the Kangaroos to the finals for her first time as coach in the 2005 season, but the club was defeated by Port Adelaide in an elimination final. In the 2006 season they regressed and finished 14th. Laidley's ferocity as a player transferred into her coaching style, with her team said to embody the "Shinboner Spirit" of determination and never giving up. She was also seen on occasion to be aggressive towards her playing group.

During a 2006 match against St Kilda, a Kangaroos supporter had a confrontation with Laidley, with the team putting up consistently poor performances. The supporter twice made remarks to which Laidley responded with an honest summation "we are all hurting", later inviting the supporter to the club rooms to see how badly the players were feeling due to their onfield performance. The footage was captured on television and broadcast nationally. The supporter died by suicide later that night, unrelated to the incident with Laidley.

Laidley took the Kangaroos to the finals for the second time in 2007. At the end of the year, her contract was due for renewal. Former Kangaroos star Wayne Carey criticised Laidley and argued that another former teammate, John Longmire, should replace her. After a forthright response by Laidley that referenced Carey's personal scandals, Carey responded by describing her as arrogant and also called her aloof, saying she generally did not acknowledge her old teammates. Despite Melbourne Football Club making advances to secure her as coach, Laidley's contract with the Kangaroos – now going by their former name, North Melbourne – was renewed for two years. She took North Melbourne to the finals again in 2008.

After a mid-season review in 2009 and following a string of losses, Laidley resigned as senior coach of North Melbourne on 16 June 2009, one round before what would have been her 150th game as coach. Laidley was replaced by assistant coach Darren Crocker as caretaker senior coach of North Melbourne for the rest of the 2009 season.

=== Port Adelaide (2010–2011) ===
In September 2009, Laidley joined the coaching group at the Port Adelaide Football Club.

After one season as an assistant to Mark Williams and later Matthew Primus, Laidley announced that she would return to Melbourne in 2011 for family reasons, but said she was available to work as an opposition scout and analysis based in Melbourne for Port Adelaide. However, on 27 October 2010, Port Adelaide announced that she would continue on as an assistant coach based four days in Adelaide and three days in Melbourne a week in the 2011 season. She interviewed for the Essendon Football Club senior coach position when it was left vacant by the sacking of Matthew Knights but was unsuccessful.

=== St Kilda (2011–2013) ===
In early November 2011, Laidley was announced as the new midfield coach of the St Kilda Football Club. Of the move, St Kilda's head of football, Chris Pelchen, said that Laidley "has a wealth of knowledge as a former player and coach in [her] own right. [Her] experience will genuinely assist the development of the whole player list at the Saints."

=== Carlton (2013–2015) ===
Laidley signed with Carlton as midfield assistant coach on 31 October 2013. With the appointment of Brendon Bolton in 2015, Laidley left Carlton.

== Statistics ==
=== Playing statistics ===
Legend
| G | Goals | K | Kicks | D | Disposals | T | Tackles |
| B | Behinds | H | Handballs | M | Marks |

| Season | Team | No. | Games | Totals | | | | | | | Averages (per game) | | | | | | | Votes |
| Season | Team | No. | Games | G | B | K | H | D | M | T | G | B | K | H | D | M | T | Votes |
|---|---|---|---|---|---|---|---|---|---|---|---|---|---|---|---|---|---|---|
| 1987 | West Coast | 15 | 10 | 2 | 5 | 119 | 24 | 143 | 37 | 6 | 0.2 | 0.5 | 11.9 | 2.4 | 14.3 | 3.7 | 0.6 | 0 |
| 1988 | West Coast | 15 | 11 | 6 | 4 | 139 | 29 | 168 | 44 | 11 | 0.5 | 0.4 | 12.6 | 2.6 | 15.3 | 4.0 | 1.0 | 0 |
| 1989 | West Coast | 15 | 10 | 0 | 3 | 116 | 60 | 176 | 40 | 15 | 0.0 | 0.3 | 11.6 | 6.0 | 17.6 | 4.0 | 1.5 | 0 |
| 1990 | West Coast | 15 | 7 | 1 | 0 | 93 | 45 | 138 | 23 | 1 | 0.1 | 0.0 | 13.3 | 6.4 | 19.7 | 3.3 | 0.1 | 5 |
| 1991 | West Coast | 15 | 0 | — | — | — | — | — | — | — | — | — | — | — | — | — | — | — |
| 1992 | West Coast | 15 | 14 | 2 | 5 | 158 | 90 | 248 | 30 | 13 | 0.1 | 0.4 | 11.3 | 6.4 | 17.7 | 2.1 | 0.9 | 2 |
| 1993 | North Melbourne | 7 | 17 | 1 | 2 | 209 | 60 | 269 | 35 | 23 | 0.1 | 0.1 | 12.3 | 3.5 | 15.8 | 2.1 | 1.4 | 6 |
| 1994 | North Melbourne | 7 | 24 | 0 | 0 | 302 | 137 | 439 | 77 | 16 | 0.0 | 0.0 | 12.6 | 5.7 | 18.3 | 3.2 | 0.7 | 4 |
| 1995 | North Melbourne | 7 | 23 | 0 | 2 | 272 | 131 | 403 | 82 | 24 | 0.0 | 0.1 | 11.8 | 5.7 | 17.5 | 3.6 | 1.0 | 3 |
| 1996† | North Melbourne | 7 | 24 | 2 | 1 | 240 | 130 | 370 | 64 | 29 | 0.1 | 0.0 | 10.0 | 5.4 | 15.4 | 2.7 | 1.2 | 0 |
| 1997 | North Melbourne | 7 | 11 | 1 | 0 | 78 | 32 | 110 | 24 | 10 | 0.1 | 0.0 | 7.1 | 2.9 | 10.0 | 2.2 | 0.9 | 0 |
| Career | | | 151 | 15 | 22 | 1726 | 738 | 2464 | 456 | 148 | 0.1 | 0.1 | 11.4 | 4.9 | 16.3 | 3.0 | 1.0 | 20 |

=== Coaching statistics ===
Legend
| W | Wins | L | Losses | D | Draws | W% | Winning percentage | LP | Ladder position | LT | League teams |

| Season | Team | Games | W | L | D | W % | LP | LT |
|---|---|---|---|---|---|---|---|---|
| 2003 | Kangaroos | 22 | 11 | 10 | 1 | 52.3% | 10 | 16 |
| 2004 | Kangaroos | 22 | 10 | 12 | 0 | 45.5% | 10 | 16 |
| 2005 | Kangaroos | 23 | 13 | 10 | 0 | 56.5% | 5 | 16 |
| 2006 | Kangaroos | 22 | 7 | 15 | 0 | 31.8% | 14 | 16 |
| 2007 | Kangaroos | 25 | 15 | 10 | 0 | 60.0% | 4 | 16 |
| 2008 | North Melbourne | 23 | 12 | 10 | 1 | 54.3% | 7 | 16 |
| 2009 (Note: Laidley resigned as coach in 2009. Darren Crocker coached the club for the remainder of the season.) | North Melbourne | 12 | 4 | 8 | 0 | 33.3% | 13 | 16 |
| Career totals | | 149 | 72 | 75 | 2 | 49.0% | | |

== Personal life ==
Laidley underwent a gender transition from 2019, and changed her name to Danielle May Laidley. After an unauthorised outing by a police officer in May 2020, she was obliged to reveal this to the public. The outing occurred after Laidley was arrested and charged with one count of stalking. She did not apply for bail. She was allegedly found with 0.43 grams of methamphetamine in her bra at the time of her arrest. A Victoria Police officer distributed photos of Laidley in women's clothing taken while she was in custody. In December, the officer was charged with unauthorised access and disclosure of police information as well as misconduct in public office. Three other officers were accused of the same breach. In November 2020, Laidley was placed into a diversion program and given an "adjourned undertaking with no conviction recorded" on the stalking charge.

Laidley was previously married to Joanna, with whom she has three children. She has since (as of September 2023) reconciled with Donna Leckie, whom she had dated on-and-off prior to her marriage. In 2021 Laidley became involved with the North Melbourne Football Club again, tossing the coin at the 2022 AFLW Pride Round game against the GWS Giants, and attending other club events with North Melbourne players and management. Her memoir, Don't Look Away, co-written with Konrad Marshall, was released in August 2022. Danielle Laidley: Two Tribes, a documentary about her life, premiered on Stan in September 2023.
