= Don Condon =

Australian rules footballer

Personal information
- Full name: Donald Roy Condon
- Born: 12 March 1923; Melbourne, Victoria
- Died: 15 February 1996 (aged 72)
- Original team: Carlton Brewery
- Height: 171 cm (5 ft 7 in)
- Weight: 66 kg (146 lb)

Playing career^{1}
Years	Club	Games (Goals)
1941	Brighton (VFA)	20 (55)
1944–1951	North Melbourne	131 (218)
1951	Brighton (VFA)	13 (39)
Total		164 (312)
- ^{1} Playing statistics correct to the end of 1951.

Career highlights
- North Melbournel leading goalkicker: 1948 (38 goals)

Donald Roy Condon (12 March 1923 – 15 February 1996) was an Australian rules footballer in the Victorian Football League, (VFL).

Condon began his senior career in the throw-pass era Victorian Football Association with Brighton, playing there in 1941 and kicking 55 goals. Condon enlisted in the Australian Army in December 1941, serving for the remainder of the duration of World War II.

In 1944 Condon moved to the VFL, trialling unsuccessfully with Essendon before joining North Melbourne. He played with North Melbourne for just over seven years from 1944 until May 1951, and won the Syd Barker Medal as North Melbourne Football Club's best player in 1946. He returned to Brighton in May 1951 and played out the rest of the season there.

He was life member of the North Melbourne Football Club.
