= Syd Dyer =

Australian rules footballer, born 1916

Personal information
- Born: 25 May 1916
- Died: 7 April 1976 (aged 59)
- Original team: South Kensington
- Height: 170 cm (5 ft 7 in)
- Weight: 76 kg (168 lb)

Playing career^{1}
Years	Club	Games (Goals)
1937–1947	North Melbourne	155 (321)
1948	Prahran	16 (51)
1949-1952	Warracknabeal	69 (?)
- ^{1} Playing statistics correct to the end of 1947.

Syd Dyer (25 May 1916 – 7 April 1976), also referred to as Sid Dyer, was an Australian rules footballer who played for North Melbourne in the Victorian Football League (VFL).

Dyer twice finished equal sixth in the annual Brownlow Medal count, first in 1939 and again in 1946. He won the Syd Barker Medal in 1939 for North Melbourne's best and fairest player and also twice topped their goalkicking, in 1946 with 55 goals and the following season with 47.
