= John Dugdale (footballer) =

Australian rules footballer

Personal information
- Born: 8 March 1936 (age 90); North Melbourne, Victoria
- Original team: North Melbourne Colts
- Height: 182 cm (6 ft 0 in)
- Weight: 82 kg (181 lb)

Playing career^{1}
| Years | Club | Games (Goals) |
| 1955–1970 | North Melbourne | 248 (358) |

Coaching career
| Years | Club | Games (W–L–D) |
| 1977 | North Melbourne | 1 (0–1–0) |
- ^{1} Playing statistics correct to the end of 1970.

Career highlights
- North Melbourne leading goalkicker 1957, 1958, 1960-1964; All Australian 1958; North Melbourne captain 1968 - 1970; Syd Barker Medal 1968; Australian Football World Tour "Galahs" representative 1967 and 1968

John Dugdale (born 8 March 1936) is a former Australian rules footballer who played for North Melbourne in the Victorian Football League (VFL). He shares with Jock Spencer the club record of seven times topping their season ending goalkicking charts. From 1957 until 1964, Dugdale was North Melbourne's top goalkicker in all but one season.

A 1958 All Australian, Dugdale was captain of the Kangaroos from 1968 to 1970. He won a Best and Fairest in his first season as captain. He played a total of 248 games between 1955 and 1970, scoring 358 goals.

He was named in the forward pocket in North Melbourne's official 'Team of the Century'
