= Bob Mathews (footballer) =

Australian rules footballer, born 1912

Personal information
- Full name: Robert Mathews
- Born: 26 August 1912; Foster, Victoria
- Died: 14 April 1989 (aged 76)
- Original team: Melrose
- Height: 175 cm (5 ft 9 in)
- Weight: 75 kg (165 lb)

Playing career^{1}
Years	Club	Games (Goals)
1930–1934	North Melbourne	58 (32)
1935	Essendon	2 (0)
Total		60 (32)
- ^{1} Playing statistics correct to the end of 1935.

Robert Mathews (26 August 1912 – 14 April 1989) was an Australian rules footballer who played with North Melbourne and Essendon in the Victorian Football League (VFL).

Mathews was a back pocket defender, but started as a forward and topped North Melbourne's goal-kicking in the 1930 VFL season, with 29 goals. He switched clubs in 1935, joining Essendon, but would only make two appearances for the club. After leaving Essendon he played for La Mascotte.

Mathews later served in the Royal Australian Air Force during the later part of World War II.
