= Fred Metcalf =

Australian rules footballer

Personal information
- Full name: John Federate Metcalf
- Born: 27 July 1899; Eaglehawk, Victoria
- Died: 10 May 1975 (aged 75); Box Hill, Victoria
- Original team: North Melbourne (VFA)
- Height: 188 cm (6 ft 2 in)
- Weight: 76 kg (168 lb)

Playing career^{1}
Years	Club	Games (Goals)
1925–1927	North Melbourne	39 (68)
- ^{1} Playing statistics correct to the end of 1927.

John Federate "Fred" Metcalf (27 July 1899 – 10 May 1975) was an Australian rules footballer who played with North Melbourne in the Victorian Football League (VFL).

Metcalf was already an established player at North Melbourne when they left the Victorian Football Association for the VFL in 1925. He played a prominent part in their win over Geelong in the opening round of the 1925 VFL season, with a club best three goals. By the end of the season he had amassed 21 goals, to finish third in North Melbourne's goal-kicking. The following year he was their leading goal-kicker, with 26 goals.
