= Peter Bosustow =

Australian rules footballer (1957–2025)

Personal information
- Full name: Peter Robert Bosustow
- Nickname: Buzz
- Born: 27 October 1957; Carlton, Victoria, Australia
- Died: 28 April 2025 (aged 67); Murdoch, Western Australia, Australia
- Original team: East Victoria Park
- Height: 1.85 m (6 ft 1 in)
- Weight: 85 kg (187 lb)

Playing career
Years	Club	Games (Goals)
1975–80, 1984–87	Perth	141 (379)
1981–1983	Carlton	65 (146)
Total		206 (525)

Career highlights
- 81 goal and 81 Mark of the year only player in history to do it in a premiership season

Peter Robert Bosustow (27 October 1957 – 28 April 2025) was an Australian rules footballer with the Perth Football Club in the West Australian Football League (WAFL) and the Carlton Football Club in the Victorian Football League (VFL).

== Career ==
Bosustow commenced his footballing career with Perth in 1975 and played in two premiership sides in 1976 and 1977. After six seasons, Bosustow was recruited to Carlton where he played in the 1981, 1982 and 1983 VFL seasons. After being suspended for four matches at the end of the 1983 season, Bosustow left Carlton to return to the Demons where he played in the WAFL from 1984 until his retirement from the game in 1987.

Bosustow played a total of 141 games with Perth, kicking 378 goals, and was named on a half-forward flank in Perth's 'Team of the Century' (1899 to 1999). Bosustow also played eight state games for Western Australia, kicking 17 goals.

== Character and legacy ==
Known as 'The Buzz', Bosustow was a flamboyant character who regularly took big marks. Despite only playing 65 games over three seasons in the VFL, he kicked 146 goals and played in two premiership sides in 1981 and 1982. He is best remembered in the VFL for winning both Mark and Goal of the Year in 1981, one of only two players to accomplish this, with Richmond's Michael Mitchell achieving the feat in 1990. At Princes Park, Bosustow flew high above a pack at full-forward to take a screamer on his chest to claim the Mark of the Year. Goal of the Year came at VFL Park: Bosustow smothered a clearing kick from a defender 15 metres around from the behind post, regathered the ball, and swung around on one step to kick a high goal over his shoulder.

== Personal life and death ==
Bosustow's father, Bob Bosustow, played with Carlton in the mid-1950s.

His son, Brent Bosustow, played 15 games for South Fremantle in the WAFL between 2003 and 2007 and one game for Swan Districts in 2007. He was named the best and fairest player in South Fremantle Colts' 2003 premiership season. Brents Career peaked with a spot on the 2009 grand final team of the D Grade Manning Rippers. And his daughter Brooke Warren had three children Josh, Mia and Nicole Warren

Bosustow died following a battle with cancer on 28 April 2025, at the age of 67.

== See also ==
- List of VFL/AFL players by ethnicity
