= Brett Allison =

Australian rules footballer, born 1968

Personal information
- Full name: Brett Allison
- Born: 26 May 1968 (age 58)
- Original team: Belconnen
- Height: 182 cm (6 ft 0 in)
- Weight: 78 kg (172 lb)

Playing career^{1}
Years	Club	Games (Goals)
1987–1999	North Melbourne	219 (276)
2000	Sydney Swans	9 (9)
Total		228 (285)
- ^{1} Playing statistics correct to the end of 2000.

Career highlights
- 2× AFL premiership player: 1996, 1999; Mark of the Year: 1991; Pre-season premiership: 1995, 1998; 7× State of origin player New South Wales

Brett Allison (born 26 May 1968) is a former Australian rules footballer who played for the North Melbourne Football Club and the Sydney Swans in the VFL/AFL. He served as the head of development at the Melbourne Football Club from 2013 to 2016.

Allison played as a crumbing forward pocket or half-forward flanker and is perhaps best remembered for his Mark of the Year in 1991, as well as being a premiership player in 1996 and 1999. He was known for his front and square ability to get the ball and sharp shooting around goals.

At the end of 1997 Allison was involved in talks that could have had him moving back to Sydney, however this deal fell through and he played his 200th for North in 1998.

At the end of 1999, he was released by North Melbourne and picked up by Sydney, finally retiring at the end of the 2000 season. At the end of his career he had played 228 games and kicked 285 goals and is one of the most successful football exports from the ACT.

Among Allison's honours apart from his '91 Mark of the Year and his two premiership medals are his 7 State of Origin appearances as well as a pre-season premiership in 1995.

Brett Allison's father Tom Allison also played for North Melbourne.

== Playing statistics ==
Legend
G	Goals	K	Kicks	D	Disposals	T	Tackles
B	Behinds	H	Handballs	M	Marks

Season	Team	No.	Games	Totals							Averages (per game)						
Season	Team	No.	Games	G	B	K	H	D	M	T	G	B	K	H	D	M	T
1987	North Melbourne	33	5	0	3	30	18	48	7	5	0.0	0.6	6.0	3.6	9.6	1.4	1.0
1988	North Melbourne	33	22	21	10	238	117	355	51	27	1.0	0.5	10.8	5.3	16.1	2.3	1.2
1989	North Melbourne	33	12	8	1	95	54	149	19	17	0.7	0.1	7.9	4.5	12.4	1.6	1.4
1990	North Melbourne	33	22	29	21	217	81	298	42	20	1.3	1.0	9.9	3.7	13.5	1.9	0.9
1991	North Melbourne	33	18	19	14	159	78	237	47	19	1.1	0.8	8.8	4.3	13.2	2.6	1.1
1992	North Melbourne	33	14	17	11	140	73	213	34	22	1.2	0.8	10.0	5.2	15.2	2.4	1.6
1993	North Melbourne	33	21	21	16	199	95	294	35	33	1.0	0.8	9.5	4.5	14.0	1.7	1.6
1994	North Melbourne	33	23	35	31	198	103	301	46	35	1.5	1.3	8.6	4.5	13.1	2.0	1.5
1995	North Melbourne	33	25	39	17	164	99	263	41	30	1.6	0.7	6.6	4.0	10.5	1.6	1.2
1996	North Melbourne	33	13	23	15	104	59	163	25	12	1.8	1.2	8.0	4.5	12.5	1.9	0.9
1997	North Melbourne	33	24	43	21	183	82	265	40	20	1.8	0.9	7.6	3.4	11.0	1.7	0.8
1998	North Melbourne	33	9	10	3	35	18	53	12	5	1.1	0.3	3.9	2.0	5.9	1.3	0.6
1999	Kangaroos	33	11	11	6	70	28	98	22	9	1.0	0.5	6.4	2.5	8.9	2.0	0.8
2000	Sydney	15	9	9	7	57	14	71	23	3	1.0	0.8	6.3	1.6	7.9	2.6	0.3
Career			228	285	176	1889	919	2808	444	257	1.3	0.8	8.3	4.0	12.3	1.9	1.1
