= Johnny Lewis (footballer) =

Australian rules footballer, born 1901

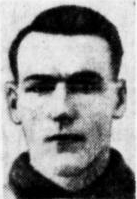

Personal information
- Full name: John Francis Lewis
- Born: 13 September 1901; West Melbourne, Victoria
- Died: 3 July 1973 (aged 71); Kew, Victoria
- Original team: North Melbourne (VFA)
- Height: 191 cm (6 ft 3 in)
- Weight: 99 kg (218 lb)
- Position: Ruckman

Playing career^{1}
Years	Club	Games (Goals)
1921–1924	North Melbourne (VFA)	36 (26)
1925–1935	North Melbourne	150 (142)
1936–1938	Melbourne	46 (18)

Representative team honours
Years	Team	Games (Goals)
	Victoria	10 (7)

Coaching career
Years	Club	Games (W–L–D)
1930	North Melbourne	18 (1–17–0)
- ^{1} Playing statistics correct to the end of 1938.

Career highlights
- North Melbourne captain 1930–1931; North Melbourne leading goalkicker 1931, 1935; North Melbourne best and fairest 1935

John Francis Lewis (13 September 1901 – 3 July 1973) was an Australian rules footballer in the (then) Victorian Football League, playing for both North Melbourne and Melbourne clubs.

Lewis, 191 cm and 99 kg, was a tough, hard ruckman who could carry the rucking load for the team during tough periods.

In 1926, Lewis applied for a clearance to coach the Rutherglen Football Club in the Ovens and Murray Football League, but his clearance was refused by North Melbourne.

In 1996 Lewis was inducted into the Australian Football Hall of Fame.

His brother, John Joseph "Bill" Lewis (1909–1949), played VFL football for North Melbourne. Lewis's great-grandson Daniel Venables played for the West Coast Eagles in the Australian Football League.
