= Jock Spencer =

Australian rules footballer

Personal information
- Full name: Thomas Spencer
- Born: 15 December 1928
- Died: 15 April 2003 (aged 74)
- Original team: North Kensington
- Height: 185 cm (6 ft 1 in)
- Weight: 78 kg (172 lb)

Playing career^{1}
Years	Club	Games (Goals)
1948–1957	North Melbourne	153 (475)
- ^{1} Playing statistics correct to the end of 1957.

Thomas 'Jock' Spencer (15 December 1928 – 15 April 2003) was an Australian rules footballer who played for North Melbourne in the Victorian Football League. He was named at full-forward in North Melbourne's official 'Team of the Century'.

Spencer started his league career in 1948 and the following season topped North Melbourne's goalkicking for the first of seven times with 65 goals. A consistent performer up forward, Spencer topped the club's goalkicking every season to 1956 with the exception of 1953 when he only managed to play four games.

He had his most prolific year in front of goal in 1950 when he kicked 86 goals and finished runner up behind John Coleman in the league's goalkicking charts. In round 16 against South Melbourne he kicked a career best 11 goals, the first double figure bag of goals in a game by a North Melbourne player. The record was equaled in 1981 by Malcolm Blight and passed by John Longmire in 1990. Spencer was a member of North Melbourne's 1950 VFL grand final side but his three goals couldn't prevent his side from going down to Essendon. He won the North Melbourne Best and Fairest in 1951.

North Melbourne visited Bolton Park, Wagga Wagga in 1952 and defeated a combined Albury & District Football League side, with Spencer kicking 18 goals.

Spencer regularly represented Victoria at interstate level, most notably at the 1956 Perth Carnival where he was the leading goalkicker with 17 goals.

His final league tally of 475 goals was a club record until surpassed by John Longmire during the 1990s.

He topped the Goulburn Valley Football League goal kicking with Shepparton United Football Club in 1963 (71) and 1965 (61) and kicked 81 goals in 1964, then retired after the 1965 season.

== Links ==
- Jock Spencer's playing statistics from AFL Tables
- Jock Spencer at AustralianFootball.com
