= Keith McKenzie (Australian footballer) =

Australian rules footballer and coach (1922–2018)

Personal information
- Full name: Keith Alexander McKenzie
- Born: 26 April 1922; South Melbourne, Victoria
- Died: 8 January 2018 (aged 95)
- Original team: North Melbourne Colts

Playing career^{1}
Years	Club	Games (Goals)
1944–1951	North Melbourne	130 (12)
1952–1954	Moorabbin (VFA)	46 (21)
Total		176 (33)

Coaching career
Years	Club	Games (W–L–D)
1966–1970	North Melbourne	82 (23–57–2)
1972, 1975	Carlton	2 (2–0–0)
Total		84 (25–57–2)
- ^{1} Playing statistics correct to the end of 1954.

Keith Alexander McKenzie (26 April 1922 – 8 January 2018) was an Australian rules footballer who played for North Melbourne in the Victorian Football League (VFL).

== Family ==
The son of Thomas Frederick McKenzie (1896–1955) and Olive Frances McKenzie (1896–1991), née Solly, Keith Alexander McKenzie was born at South Melbourne on 26 April 1922.

== War Service ==
McKenzie enlisted to serve in the Royal Australian Air Force with his parents' permission in June 1941, aged 19. He served in Darwin and then New Guinea as a flight rigger with the 77th Squadron before moving back to Melbourne so serve at the 1st Aircraft Depot at Laverton in early 1944.

== Football ==
McKenzie started his football career with the North Melbourne Colts before he enlisted, and joined North Melbourne at the start of the 1944 season. He won the Syd Barker Medal, awarded to North Melbourne's best and fairest player for the season, in his third year at the club and went on to represent Victoria five times.

After finishing his playing career, McKenzie went on to coach both North Melbourne and Carlton.
