= Scott Thompson (footballer, born 1986) =

Australian rules footballer (born 1986)

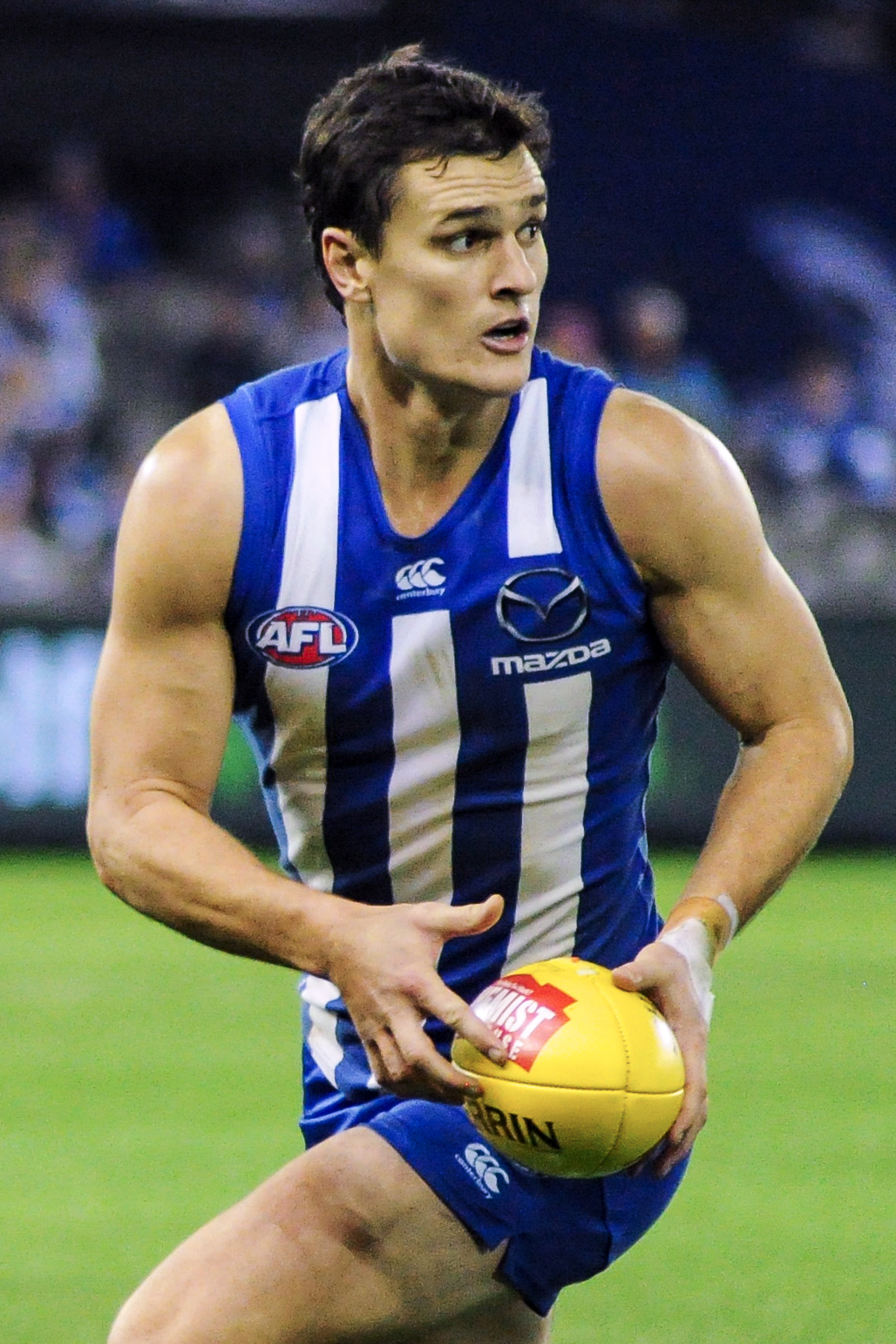
- Thompson playing for North Melbourne in April 2018

Personal information
- Full name: Scott D. Thompson
- Born: 9 May 1986 (age 40); Geelong, Victoria
- Original team: Geelong VFL
- Draft: No. 37, 2007 national draft
- Height: 193 cm (6 ft 4 in)
- Weight: 96 kg (212 lb)
- Position: Full back

Club information
- Current club: North Melbourne
- Number: 16

Playing career^{1}
Years	Club	Games (Goals)
2008–2019	North Melbourne	241 (7)
- ^{1} Playing statistics correct to the end of 2019.

Career highlights
- 2013 All-Australian team; Syd Barker Medal: 2013

Scott D. Thompson (born 9 May 1986) is a former Australian rules footballer who played for the North Melbourne Football Club in the Australian Football League (AFL). He was selected 37th overall in the 2007 AFL draft by North Melbourne.

== Early career ==
As a teenager, Thompson starred in the Geelong Football League. Playing his preferred position of full back, Thompson played a key role in Geelong's VFL premiership side in 2007, his heroic actions stopping a key forward about 30 kg heavier than him in the 2006 grand final, has become legend at his local club, South Barwon.

Thompson has said that playing on the big forwards of the GFL gave him a platform to build his whole AFL career on.

== North Melbourne ==
Thompson made his debut for the Kangaroos in 2008, playing 6 games for the season.

Thompson played every game in 2009, his best season to date. He claimed some big scalps, including Port Adelaide's Warren Tredrea, Magpie Jack Anthony, Essendon veteran Matthew Lloyd and Brisbane spearhead Daniel Bradshaw, whom he kept goalless in 103 minutes of playing time in Round 10. Thompson has been dubbed 'Mr. Annoying,' as several of his opponents have been sent to the tribunal for responding to his niggling tactics, including Cameron Mooney and Jack Anthony, who headbutted him in the groin.

On 22 May 2010, Thompson was the centre of attention when he bumped over Western Bulldog Barry Hall whilst tying his shoelace, triggering an ugly altercation between Hall and several other Kangaroos players. Hall reacted to the taunts by putting Thompson in a headlock and was subsequently reported for both wrestling and rough conduct.

All Australian team selector, Gerard Healy commented that Thompson's incredible performance this year is unheralded to date, and suggested that he was a definite contender for full back on the All Australian team.

Thompson scored his first AFL goal in 2010 against West Coast and scored 2 the following year against Sydney.

Thompson was runner up for The Syd Barker Medal (NMFC Best and Fairest) in 2009 and 2012. He finished second to Captain Andrew Swallow on both occasions.

In 2012, Thompson also recorded a career high in disposals (39) against GWS.

In 2013, Thompson was announced in North Melbournes leadership group for the 2013 season and onwards with Andrew Swallow, Drew Petrie, Jack Ziebell, Daniel Wells and Brent Harvey. He won the 2013 Syd Barker Medal, tying with teammate Daniel Wells.

Thompson had a great start to his 2014 season, including holding Lance Franklin goalless in the side's road win against Sydney in Round 4. However, Thompson finished the season disappointingly, but enhancing his offensive game was a huge positive for him.

Thompson retired at the end of the 2019 season and celebrated a win in his final game. He was still playing some good footy, as his career concluded.

== Statistics ==
Legend
G	Goals	K	Kicks	D	Disposals	T	Tackles
B	Behinds	H	Handballs	M	Marks

Season	Team	No.	Games	Totals							Averages (per game)							Votes
Season	Team	No.	Games	G	B	K	H	D	M	T	G	B	K	H	D	M	T	Votes
2008	North Melbourne	37	6	0	0	44	27	71	27	8	0.0	0.0	7.3	4.5	11.8	4.5	1.3	0
2009	North Melbourne	16	22	0	0	170	178	348	102	57	0.0	0.0	7.7	8.1	15.8	4.6	2.6	0
2010	North Melbourne	16	22	1	2	165	215	380	87	54	0.0	0.1	7.5	9.8	17.3	4.0	2.5	4
2011	North Melbourne	16	22	2	2	197	196	393	102	60	0.1	0.1	9.0	8.9	17.9	4.6	2.7	1
2012	North Melbourne	16	21	0	3	184	203	387	123	48	0.0	0.1	8.8	9.7	18.4	5.9	2.3	6
2013	North Melbourne	16	19	2	0	228	144	372	124	42	0.1	0.0	12.0	7.6	19.6	6.5	2.2	4
2014	North Melbourne	16	24	1	1	226	171	397	138	47	0.0	0.0	9.4	7.1	16.5	5.8	2.0	4
2015	North Melbourne	16	24	0	0	203	146	349	114	44	0.0	0.0	8.5	6.1	14.5	4.8	1.8	0
2016	North Melbourne	16	19	0	1	164	111	275	94	32	0.0	0.1	8.6	5.8	14.5	4.9	1.7	1
2017	North Melbourne	16	21	1	1	168	154	322	108	52	0.0	0.0	8.0	7.3	15.3	5.1	2.5	0
2018	North Melbourne	16	22	0	0	211	121	332	124	49	0.0	0.0	9.6	5.5	15.1	5.6	2.2	3
2019	North Melbourne	16	19	0	0	195	94	289	89	35	0.0	0.0	10.3	4.9	15.2	4.7	1.8	0
Career			241	7	10	2155	1760	3915	1232	528	0.0	0.0	8.9	7.3	16.2	5.1	2.2	23
