= Syd Barker Medal =

North Melbourne best and fairest award

The Syd Barker Medal is awarded to the North Melbourne Football Club player who has been judged the best and fairest of the footy season. The award has been given out continuously since 1937. Before then it was known as the Syd Barker Memorial Trophy.

The award is named after Syd Barker who was a popular captain of the North Melbourne Football Club in 1915–1919, 1921 & 1927. He was a brilliant ruckmen of his time, starring in North Melbourne's 1910, 1914, 1915 and 1918 premiership sides, and captaining the famous "Invincibles" side that went undefeated in a record 58 games.

The voting system as of the 2017 AFL season, consists of each player earning up to 20 votes in a match, with votes from their best 20 games and finals counting towards their final total.

== Recipients ==
^	Denotes current player
+	Player won Brownlow Medal in same season

Season	Recipient(s)	Ref.
1929	Charles Cameron	
1930	—N/a	
1931	—N/a	
1932	Jack Patterson	
1933	—N/a	
1934	—N/a	
1935	Wally Carter	
1936	Charlie Skinner	
1937	Wally Carter (2)	
1938	Jock Cordner	
1939	Sid Dyer	
1940	Jim Adamson	
1941	Bill Findlay	
1941	George Kennedy	
1942	Jack Allister	
1943	Don Kemp	
1944	Alan Crawford	
1945	Les Foote	
1946	Don Condon	
1947	Keith McKenzie	
1948	Dally O'Brien	
1949	Les Foote (2)	
1950	Les Foote (3)	
1951	Jock Spencer	
1952	Jock McCorkell	
1953	Jack O'Halloran	
1954	John Brady	
1955	Bob Brooker	
1956	Jack Edwards	
1957	Bryan Martyn	
1958	Allen Aylett	
1959	Allen Aylett (2)	
1960	Allen Aylett (3)	
1961	Laurie Dwyer	
1962	Bill Serong	
1963	Noel Teasdale	
1964	Noel Teasdale (2)	
1965	Noel Teasdale+ (3)	
1966	Noel Teasdale (4)	
1967	Laurie Dwyer (2)	
1968	John Dugdale	
1969	Sam Kekovich	
1970	Barry Cable	
1971	David Dench	
1972	Ken Montgomery	
1973	Barry Davis	
1974	John Rantall	
1975	Barry Davis (2)	
1976	David Dench (2)	
1977	David Dench (3)	
1978	Malcolm Blight+	
1979	Gary Dempsey	
1980	Keith Greig	
1981	David Dench (4)	
1982	Ross Glendinning	
1983	Ross Glendinning+ (2)	
1984	Kym Hodgeman	
1985	Matthew Larkin	
1986	Jim Krakouer	
1987	Matthew Larkin (2)	
1988	Matthew Larkin (3)	
1989	Mick Martyn	
1990	John Longmire	
1991	Mick Martyn (2)	
1991	Craig Sholl	
1992	Wayne Carey	
1993	Wayne Carey (2)	
1994	Wayne Schwass	
1995	Wayne Schwass (2)	
1996	Wayne Carey (3)	
1997	Anthony Stevens	
1998	Wayne Carey (4)	
1999	Anthony Stevens (2)	
2000	Peter Bell	
2001	Shannon Grant	
2002	Adam Simpson	
2003	Brent Harvey	
2004	Brady Rawlings	
2005	Brent Harvey (2)	
2006	Brady Rawlings (2)	
2007	Brent Harvey (3)	
2008	Brent Harvey (4)	
2009	Andrew Swallow	
2010	Brent Harvey (5)	
2010	Brady Rawlings (3)	
2011	Andrew Swallow (2)	
2011	Daniel Wells	
2012	Andrew Swallow (3)	
2013	Scott Thompson	
2013	Daniel Wells (2)	
2014	Ben Cunnington	
2015	Todd Goldstein	
2016	Robbie Tarrant	
2017	Shaun Higgins	
2018	Shaun Higgins (2)	
2019	Ben Cunnington (2)	
2020	Luke McDonald^	
2021	Jy Simpkin^	
2022	Jy Simpkin^ (2)	
2023	Harry Sheezel^	
2024	Luke Davies-Uniacke^	
2025	Harry Sheezel^ (2)	
2025	Tristan Xerri^	
2026	Harry Sheezel^ (3)	

== Multiple winners ==
^	Denotes current player

Player	Medals	Seasons
Brent Harvey	5	2003, 2005, 2007, 2008, 2010
Wayne Carey	4	1992, 1993, 1996, 1998
David Dench	4	1971, 1976, 1977, 1981
Noel Teasdale	4	1963, 1964, 1965, 1966
Allen Aylett	3	1958, 1959, 1960
Les Foote	3	1945, 1949, 1950
Matthew Larkin	3	1985, 1987, 1988
Brady Rawlings	3	2004, 2006, 2010
Harry Sheezel^	3	2023, 2025, 2026
Andrew Swallow	3	2009, 2011, 2012
Wally Carter	2	1935, 1937
Ben Cunnington	2	2014, 2019
Laurie Dwyer	2	1961, 1967
Ross Glendinning	2	1982, 1983
Shaun Higgins	2	2017, 2018
Mick Martyn	2	1989, 1991
Wayne Schwass	2	1994, 1995
Jy Simpkin^	2	2021, 2022
Anthony Stevens	2	1997, 1999
Daniel Wells	2	2011, 2013
