= 2014 AFL season =

118th season of the Australian Football League (AFL)

2014 AFL premiership season
- Teams: 18
- Premiers: Hawthorn; 12th premiership
- Minor premiers: Sydney; 8th minor premiership
- Brownlow Medallist: Matt Priddis; West Coast (26 votes)
- Coleman Medallist: Lance Franklin; Sydney (67 goals)

Attendance
- Matches played: 207
- Total attendance: 6,972,552 (33,684 per match)
- Highest (H&A): 91,731 (round 6, Collingwood v Essendon)
- Highest (finals): 99,454 (Grand Final, Sydney vs. Hawthorn)

The 2014 AFL season was the 118th season of the Australian Football League (AFL), the highest level senior Australian rules football competition in Australia, which was known as the Victorian Football League until 1989. The season featured eighteen clubs, ran from 14 March until 27 September, and comprised a 22-game home-and-away season followed by a finals series featuring the top eight clubs.

The premiership was won by the Hawthorn Football Club for the twelfth time and second time consecutively, after it defeated Sydney by 63 points in the 2014 AFL Grand Final.

== Pre-season ==
From 2014, the AFL abandoned the pre-season premiership, which since 1988 had seen practice matches combined with a (usually knock-out) tournament ending with a winning club.

Instead, the pre-season has featured a series of stand-alone practice matches, which has been the case ever since. Known as the 2014 NAB Challenge, the series featured 27 practice matches played over 25 days, beginning 26 February and ending 22 March. Each team played three pre-season games, many of which were played at suburban or regional venues, with most games televised on Fox Footy. The nine-point super goal was used in these matches.

	Week 1
Wednesday, 12 February (7:10 pm)	Geelong 0.16.8 (104)	def.	Collingwood 1.13.15 (102)	Simonds Stadium (crowd: 12,140)	Report
Thursday, 13 February (7:10 pm)	Hawthorn 1.22.13 (154)	def.	Brisbane Lions 0.3.5 (23)	Etihad Stadium (crowd: 5,003)	Report
Friday, 14 February (7:10 pm)	Richmond 1.10.15 (84)	def. by	Melbourne 1.13.11 (98)	Etihad Stadium (crowd: 12,024)	Report
Saturday, 15 February (4:40 pm)	North Melbourne 0.14.9 (93)	def. by	Carlton 1.14.7 (100)	Eureka Stadium (crowd: 7,800)	Report
Sunday, 16 February (4:10 pm)	Adelaide 0.18.11 (119)	def.	Port Adelaide 0.9.5 (59)	Richmond Oval (crowd: 8,765)	Report

	Week 2
Monday, 17 February (6:10 pm)	Gold Coast 1.11.15 (90)	def.	Essendon 0.13.11 (89)	Metricon Stadium (crowd: 6,083)	Report
Tuesday, 18 February (4:10 pm)	Fremantle 0.10.4 (64)	def. by	West Coast 2.20.10 (148)	Arena Joondalup (crowd: 10,737)	Report
Wednesday, 19 February (7:10 pm)	Western Bulldogs 0.10.7 (67)	def.	St Kilda 1.7.5 (56)	Simonds Stadium (crowd: 2,894)	Report
Thursday, 20 February (7:10 pm)	Greater Western Sydney 0.11.9 (75)	def. by	Sydney 2.15.7 (115)	StarTrack Oval (crowd: 6,854)	Report
Friday, 21 February (7:10 pm)	Hawthorn 0.18.10 (118)	def.	North Melbourne 0.7.11 (53)	Aurora Stadium (crowd: 4,000)	Report
Saturday, 22 February (4:40 pm)	Collingwood 1.10.7 (76)	def. by	Richmond 1.17.13 (124)	Wangaratta Showgrounds (crowd: 11,000)	Report
Sunday, 23 February (3:40 pm)	Brisbane Lions 1.14.13 (106)	def.	Gold Coast 0.8.11 (59)	Tony Ireland Stadium (crowd: 6,426)	Report

	Week 3
Monday, 24 February (7:10 pm)	Carlton 0.9.7 (61)	def. by	Adelaide 1.13.12 (99)	Etihad Stadium (crowd: 7,617)	Report
Tuesday, 25 February (7:10 pm)	Essendon 0.9.11 (65)	def. by	Port Adelaide 1.11.15 (90)	Etihad Stadium (crowd: 8,022)	Report
Wednesday, 26 February (7:10 pm)	Western Bulldogs 0.9.15 (69)	def. by	Fremantle 0.15.7 (97)	Etihad Stadium (crowd: 4,914)	Report
Thursday, 27 February (7:10 pm)	Sydney 0.5.7 (37)	def. by	West Coast 0.10.12 (72)	Blacktown International Sportspark (crowd: 3,045)	Report
Friday, 28 February (5:40 pm)	Melbourne 3.9.3 (84)	def. by	Geelong 0.14.13 (97)	TIO Traeger Park (crowd: 5,378)	Report
Saturday, 1 March (4:40 pm)	Greater Western Sydney 7.11.10 (139)	def.	St Kilda 0.10.11 (71)	Robertson Oval (crowd: 7,944)	Report

=== Practice matches ===
Additionally, each club played a further practice match after the NAB Challenge under the regular AFL season rules, however these matches were not televised.

	Practice matches
Sunday, 2 March (12:00 pm)	Gold Coast 14.13 (97)	def. by	Collingwood 16.15 (111)	Metricon Stadium (crowd: 4,830)	Report
Thursday, 6 March (4:40 pm)	West Coast 13.8 (86)	def.	Fremantle 9.13 (67)	Patersons Stadium (crowd: 12,000)	Report
Friday, 7 March (1:00 pm)	Richmond 15.11 (101)	def.	Essendon 8.8 (56)	ME Bank Centre (crowd: 2,100)	Report
Friday, 7 March (2:00 pm)	Greater Western Sydney 11.8 (74)	def. by	Adelaide 12.10 (82)	Blacktown International Sportspark (crowd: 1,500)	Report
Friday, 7 March (4:00 pm)	Carlton 9.12 (66)	def. by	Western Bulldogs 12.11 (83)	Visy Park (crowd: 4,000)	Report
Friday, 7 March (7:00 pm)	Geelong 10.7 (67)	def. by	North Melbourne 11.10 (76)	Simonds Stadium (crowd: 4,594)	Report
Saturday, 8 March (12:30 pm)	Port Adelaide 18.7 (115)	def.	St Kilda 16.10 (106)	Alberton Oval (crowd: 6,000)	Report
Saturday, 8 March (1:00 pm)	Melbourne 4.8 (32)	def. by	Hawthorn 21.16 (142)	Casey Fields (crowd: 9,723)	Report
Saturday, 8 March (2:30 pm)	Brisbane Lions 8.11 (59)	def. by	Sydney 12.14 (86)	Burpengary Regional Sports Park (crowd: 6,096)	Report

== Premiership season ==
The full fixture was released on Thursday 31 October 2013, and the premiership season was launched at the redeveloped Adelaide Oval in South Australia on 5 March. Notable features of the draw included:

- Geelong played most of its home games at night in 2014, with its first game played against Adelaide on a Thursday night in round 1.
- The Melbourne Cricket Ground was unavailable for round 1 due to cricket commitments. This meant that the ground did not host a round 1 match for the first time since 2006 (due to the Commonwealth Games), and the match between Richmond and Carlton which had served as the season's first match in Melbourne since 2008 was held in round 2 instead.
- The AFL trialled five Sunday night matches during the season, two of which were televised on the Seven Network.
- Traeger Park in Alice Springs hosted its first premiership match when Melbourne met Port Adelaide in round 11.
- Match starting times are local.

=== Round 1 ===
	Round 1
Friday, 14 March (7:50 pm)	Collingwood 5.16 (46)	def. by	Fremantle 17.14 (116)	Etihad Stadium (crowd: 37,571)	Match report
Saturday, 15 March (4:40 pm)	Greater Western Sydney 15.9 (99)	def.	Sydney 9.13 (67)	Spotless Stadium (crowd: 17,102)	Match report
Saturday, 15 March (6:55 pm)	Gold Coast 12.15 (87)	def.	Richmond 10.9 (69)	Metricon Stadium (crowd: 19,425)	Match report
Sunday, 16 March (7:40 pm)	Carlton 12.15 (87)	def. by	Port Adelaide 18.12 (120)	Etihad Stadium (crowd: 24,640)	Match report
Thursday, 20 March (7:10 pm)	Geelong 18.11 (119)	def.	Adelaide 12.9 (81)	Simonds Stadium (crowd: 23,622)	Match report
Friday, 21 March (7:50 pm)	North Melbourne 9.6 (60)	def. by	Essendon 15.9 (99)	Etihad Stadium (crowd: 42,332)	Match report
Saturday, 22 March (4:40 pm)	Hawthorn 21.13 (139)	def.	Brisbane Lions 13.13 (91)	Aurora Stadium (crowd: 12,430)	Match report
Saturday, 22 March (7:40 pm)	St Kilda 10.8 (68)	def.	Melbourne 6.15 (51)	Etihad Stadium (crowd: 31,657)	Match report
Sunday, 23 March (4:40 pm)	West Coast 21.8 (134)	def.	Western Bulldogs 11.3 (69)	Patersons Stadium (crowd: 36,752)	Match report
The start of the second quarter of the Greater Western Sydney vs Sydney match was delayed for twenty-five minutes under the lightning policy. The start of the Gold Coast vs Richmond match was consequently delayed by fifteen minutes, so that the television broadcasts of the two matches did not overlap.; Dustin Fletcher played his 379th game for Essendon, breaking the club's games record previously held by Simon Madden.

=== Round 2 ===
	Round 2
Thursday, 27 March (7:50 pm)	Richmond 14.14 (98)	def.	Carlton 12.14 (86)	MCG (crowd: 62,037)	Match report
Friday, 28 March (7:50 pm)	Essendon 12.14 (86)	def. by	Hawthorn 13.12 (90)	Etihad Stadium (crowd: 44,163)	Match report
Saturday, 29 March (1:45 pm)	St Kilda 15.5 (95)	def.	Greater Western Sydney 13.10 (88)	Etihad Stadium (crowd: 19,640)	Match report
Saturday, 29 March (4:40 pm)	Port Adelaide 19.13 (127)	def.	Adelaide 11.7 (73)	Adelaide Oval (crowd: 50,397)	Match report
Saturday, 29 March (7:40 pm)	Fremantle 12.15 (87)	def.	Gold Coast 5.9 (39)	Patersons Stadium (crowd: 35,583)	Match report
Saturday, 29 March (7:40 pm)	Sydney 10.9 (69)	def. by	Collingwood 12.17 (89)	ANZ Stadium (crowd: 32,347)	Match report
Sunday, 30 March (12:10 pm)	Brisbane Lions 10.8 (68)	def. by	Geelong 13.15 (93)	Gabba (crowd: 20,933)	Match report
Sunday, 30 March (3:15 pm)	Melbourne 4.6 (30)	def. by	West Coast 18.15 (123)	MCG (crowd: 22,230)	Match report
Sunday, 30 March (4:40 pm)	Western Bulldogs 8.6 (54)	def. by	North Melbourne 12.11 (83)	Etihad Stadium (crowd: 28,512)	Match report

=== Round 3 ===
	Round 3
Friday, 4 April (7:50 pm)	Hawthorn 21.11 (137)	def.	Fremantle 11.13 (79)	MCG (crowd: 43,583)	Match report
Saturday, 5 April (1:45 pm)	Western Bulldogs 15.10 (100)	def.	Richmond 15.8 (98)	Etihad Stadium (crowd: 31,724)	Match report
Saturday, 5 April (1:40 pm)	Adelaide 9.17 (71)	def. by	Sydney 21.8 (134)	Adelaide Oval (crowd: 47,426)	Match report
Saturday, 5 April (3:40 pm)	Gold Coast 17.12 (114)	def.	Brisbane Lions 9.7 (61)	Metricon Stadium (crowd: 16,593)	Match report
Saturday, 5 April (7:40 pm)	Collingwood 11.10 (76)	def. by	Geelong 12.15 (87)	MCG (crowd: 63,152)	Match report
Saturday, 5 April (7:40 pm)	West Coast 12.11 (83)	def.	St Kilda 8.10 (58)	Patersons Stadium (crowd: 36,448)	Match report
Sunday, 6 April (1:10 pm)	Greater Western Sydney 10.19 (79)	def.	Melbourne 7.5 (47)	Spotless Stadium (crowd: 7,016)	Match report
Sunday, 6 April (4:10 pm)	North Melbourne 14.13 (97)	def.	Port Adelaide 13.12 (90)	Etihad Stadium (crowd: 19,111)	Match report
Sunday, 6 April (7:10 pm)	Essendon 21.12 (138)	def.	Carlton 8.9 (57)	MCG (crowd: 62,730)	Match report

=== Round 4 ===
	Round 4
Friday, 11 April (7:50 pm)	Richmond 10.12 (72)	def. by	Collingwood 16.14 (110)	MCG (crowd: 62,100)	Match report
Saturday, 12 April (1:45 pm)	Carlton 7.16 (58)	def. by	Melbourne 12.9 (81)	MCG (crowd: 37,323)	Match report
Saturday, 12 April (1:40 pm)	Port Adelaide 24.15 (159)	def.	Brisbane Lions 7.4 (46)	Adelaide Oval (crowd: 36,231)	Match report
Saturday, 12 April (4:40 pm)	Greater Western Sydney 12.11 (83)	def. by	Western Bulldogs 17.8 (110)	StarTrack Oval (crowd: 7,863)	Match report
Saturday, 12 April (7:40 pm)	Gold Coast 7.7 (49)	def. by	Hawthorn 23.10 (148)	Metricon Stadium (crowd: 17,729)	Match report
Saturday, 12 April (7:40 pm)	Geelong 16.11 (107)	def.	West Coast 4.8 (32)	Simonds Stadium (crowd: 25,271)	Match report
Sunday, 13 April (1:10 pm)	Sydney 6.12 (48)	def. by	North Melbourne 13.13 (91)	SCG (crowd: 25,505)	Match report
Sunday, 13 April (3:20 pm)	St Kilda 7.8 (50)	def. by	Adelaide 20.16 (136)	Etihad Stadium (crowd: 22,923)	Match report
Sunday, 13 April (2:40 pm)	Fremantle 18.5 (113)	def.	Essendon 9.6 (60)	Patersons Stadium (crowd: 36,722)	Match report
The Brisbane Lions suffered their worst ever defeat against Port Adelaide, losing by 113 points. It was the club's first loss by 100 points or more since round 22, 2005.

=== Round 5 ===
	Round 5
Thursday, 17 April (7:50 pm)	Brisbane Lions 9.9 (63)	def. by	Richmond 15.16 (106)	Gabba (crowd: 20,676)	Match report
Saturday, 19 April (1:40 pm)	Collingwood 13.15 (93)	def.	North Melbourne 8.10 (58)	MCG (crowd: 57,116)	Match report
Saturday, 19 April (4:40 pm)	Sydney 13.14 (92)	def.	Fremantle 11.9 (75)	SCG (crowd: 25,376)	Match report
Saturday, 19 April (5:40 pm)	West Coast 7.14 (56)	def. by	Port Adelaide 10.10 (70)	Patersons Stadium (crowd: 35,366)	Match report
Saturday, 19 April (7:40 pm)	Essendon 9.11 (65)	def. by	St Kilda 11.15 (81)	Etihad Stadium (crowd: 36,041)	Match report
Sunday, 20 April (12:40 pm)	Adelaide 21.11 (137)	def.	Greater Western Sydney 10.12 (72)	Adelaide Oval (crowd: 44,770)	Match report
Sunday, 20 April (3:20 pm)	Melbourne 11.12 (78)	def. by	Gold Coast 11.20 (86)	MCG (crowd: 17,243)	Match report
Sunday, 20 April (4:40 pm)	Western Bulldogs 13.13 (91)	def. by	Carlton 18.11 (119)	Etihad Stadium (crowd: 27,986)	Match report
Monday, 21 April (3:20 pm)	Geelong 15.16 (106)	def.	Hawthorn 12.15 (87)	MCG (crowd: 80,222)	Match report

=== Round 6 ===
	Round 6
Friday, 25 April (2:40 pm)	Collingwood 12.11 (83)	def.	Essendon 8.12 (60)	MCG (crowd: 91,731)	Match report
Friday, 25 April (6:40 pm)	Fremantle 8.13 (61)	def. by	North Melbourne 10.14 (74)	Patersons Stadium (crowd: 37,624)	Match report
Friday, 25 April (7:45 pm)	St Kilda 11.13 (79)	def. by	Brisbane Lions 12.10 (82)	Westpac Stadium (crowd: 13,409)	Match report
Saturday, 26 April (1:40 pm)	Gold Coast 20.14 (134)	def.	Greater Western Sydney 13.16 (94)	Metricon Stadium (crowd: 11,504)	Match report
Saturday, 26 April (4:40 pm)	Carlton 14.8 (92)	def.	West Coast 12.17 (89)	Etihad Stadium (crowd: 31,005)	Match report
Saturday, 26 April (7:40 pm)	Melbourne 5.8 (38)	def. by	Sydney 9.15 (69)	MCG (crowd: 24,855)	Match report
Sunday, 27 April (1:10 pm)	Western Bulldogs 12.11 (83)	def. by	Adelaide 13.14 (92)	Etihad Stadium (crowd: 17,404)	Match report
Sunday, 27 April (3:20 pm)	Richmond 7.10 (52)	def. by	Hawthorn 18.10 (118)	MCG (crowd: 52,990)	Match report
Sunday, 27 April (4:10 pm)	Port Adelaide 16.11 (107)	def.	Geelong 9.13 (67)	Adelaide Oval (crowd: 47,007)	Match report
Port Adelaide ended a 10 game losing streak against Geelong.

=== Round 7 ===
	Round 7
Friday, 2 May (7:50 pm)	Carlton 10.10 (70)	def. by	Collingwood 14.20 (104)	MCG (crowd: 68,251)	Match report
Saturday, 3 May (1:45 pm)	Hawthorn 27.13 (175)	def.	St Kilda 4.6 (30)	MCG (crowd: 32,924)	Match report
Saturday, 3 May (2:10 pm)	Greater Western Sydney 15.7 (97)	def. by	Port Adelaide 20.12 (132)	StarTrack Oval (crowd: 6,549)	Match report
Saturday, 3 May (4:10 pm)	Adelaide 9.13 (67)	def. by	Melbourne 11.4 (70)	Adelaide Oval (crowd: 44,216)	Match report
Saturday, 3 May (7:40 pm)	Essendon 10.13 (73)	def.	Western Bulldogs 9.11 (65)	Etihad Stadium (crowd: 33,289)	Match Report
Saturday, 3 May (7:40 pm)	Brisbane Lions 6.8 (44)	def. by	Sydney 18.15 (123)	Gabba (crowd: 17,953)	Match report
Sunday, 4 May (1:10 pm)	North Melbourne 11.11 (77)	def. by	Gold Coast 18.12 (120)	Etihad Stadium (crowd: 19,819)	Match report
Sunday, 4 May (2:40 pm)	West Coast 7.12 (54)	def. by	Fremantle 11.7 (73)	Patersons Stadium (crowd: 40,476)	Match report
Sunday, 4 May (3:20 pm)	Geelong 11.15 (81)	def.	Richmond 12.4 (76)	MCG (crowd: 34,377)	Match report
Hawthorn recorded its largest winning margin against St Kilda, beating the 129-point margin previously set in round 3, 1983.; Melbourne won in South Australia for the first time since round 2, 2001, breaking a 17-match losing streak.

=== Round 8 ===
	Round 8
Friday, 9 May (7:50 pm)	Sydney 15.17 (107)	def.	Hawthorn 13.10 (88)	ANZ Stadium (crowd: 34,506)	Match report
Saturday, 10 May (1:10 pm)	Port Adelaide 13.16 (94)	def.	Fremantle 11.10 (76)	Adelaide Oval (crowd: 38,234)	Match report
Saturday, 10 May (4:40 pm)	Brisbane Lions 8.9 (57)	def. by	Essendon 9.11 (65)	Gabba (crowd: 26,432)	Match report
Saturday, 10 May (7:40 pm)	Melbourne 12.11 (83)	def. by	Western Bulldogs 15.9 (99)	MCG (crowd: 36,326)	Match report
Sunday, 11 May (2:40 pm)	West Coast 30.8 (188)	def.	Greater Western Sydney 12.5 (77)	Patersons Stadium (crowd: 29,391)	Match report
Monday, 12 May (7:20 pm)	St Kilda 9.15 (69)	def. by	Carlton 15.11 (101)	Etihad Stadium (crowd: 26,708)	Match report
	Bye; Adelaide, Collingwood, Geelong, Gold Coast, North Melbourne, Richmond
Josh Kennedy (West Coast) kicked eleven goals against Greater Western Sydney.

=== Round 9 ===
	Round 9
Thursday, 15 May (7:20 pm)	Adelaide 10.16 (76)	def.	Collingwood 7.13 (55)	Adelaide Oval (crowd: 50,051)	Match report
Friday, 16 May (7:50 pm)	Essendon 9.10 (64)	def. by	Sydney 18.6 (114)	Etihad Stadium (crowd: 41,098)	Match report
Saturday, 17 May (1:40 pm)	Richmond 9.20 (74)	def. by	Melbourne 14.7 (91)	MCG (crowd: 56,910)	Match report
Saturday, 17 May (4:40 pm)	North Melbourne 17.23 (125)	def.	Brisbane Lions 6.2 (38)	Etihad Stadium (crowd: 21,152)	Match report
Saturday, 17 May (5:40 pm)	Fremantle 13.18 (96)	def.	Geelong 9.10 (64)	Patersons Stadium (crowd: 38,565)	Match report
Sunday, 18 May (4:40 pm)	St Kilda 13.9 (87)	def. by	Gold Coast 19.11 (125)	Etihad Stadium (crowd: 14,625)	Match report
	Bye; Carlton, Greater Western Sydney, Hawthorn, Port Adelaide, West Coast, Western Bulldogs
Matthew Pavlich became the first Perth-based player to play 300 AFL games.

=== Round 10 ===
	Round 10
Friday, 23 May (7:50 pm)	Geelong 16.15 (111)	def.	North Melbourne 13.13 (91)	Simonds Stadium (crowd: 27,402)	Match report
Saturday, 24 May (1:40 pm)	Greater Western Sydney 5.11 (41)	def. by	Richmond 24.10 (154)	Spotless Stadium (crowd: 8,331)	Match report
Saturday, 24 May (4:40 pm)	Collingwood 17.7 (109)	def.	West Coast 15.11 (101)	MCG (crowd: 53,049)	Match report
Saturday, 24 May (7:10 pm)	Port Adelaide 15.10 (100)	def.	Hawthorn 13.8 (86)	Adelaide Oval (crowd: 52,233)	Match report
Sunday, 25 May (3:20 pm)	Gold Coast 18.11 (119)	def.	Western Bulldogs 10.14 (74)	Metricon Stadium (crowd: 14,235)	Match report
Sunday, 25 May (4:40 pm)	Carlton 12.9 (81)	def.	Adelaide 10.16 (76)	MCG (crowd: 32,419)	Match report
	Bye; Brisbane Lions, Essendon, Fremantle, Melbourne, St Kilda, Sydney
Jack Riewoldt kicked a personal best eleven goals in Richmond's victory against Greater Western Sydney.

=== Round 11 ===
	Round 11 (Indigenous Round)
Thursday, 29 May (7:10 pm)	Sydney 22.16 (148)	def.	Geelong 5.8 (38)	SCG (crowd: 37,355)	Match report
Friday, 30 May (7:50 pm)	St Kilda 8.6 (54)	def. by	Collingwood 21.14 (140)	Etihad Stadium (crowd: 34,855)	Match report
Saturday, 31 May (1:10 pm)	Melbourne 11.9 (75)	def. by	Port Adelaide 14.11 (95)	TIO Traeger Park (crowd: 5,655)	Match report
Saturday, 31 May (4:40 pm)	Brisbane Lions 14.14 (98)	def.	Carlton 13.13 (91)	Gabba (crowd: 24,625)	Match report
Saturday, 31 May (7:45 pm)	Essendon 15.14 (104)	def.	Richmond 7.12 (54)	MCG (crowd: 74,664)	Match report
Sunday, 1 June (12:40 pm)	Adelaide 16.13 (109)	def.	Gold Coast 11.11 (77)	Adelaide Oval (crowd: 49,069)	Match report
Sunday, 1 June (3:20 pm)	Western Bulldogs 6.15 (51)	def. by	Fremantle 13.11 (89)	Etihad Stadium (crowd: 14,913)	Match report
Sunday, 1 June (4:40 pm)	Hawthorn 14.10 (94)	def.	Greater Western Sydney 13.9 (87)	MCG (crowd: 17,906)	Match report
Sunday, 1 June (5:40 pm)	West Coast 6.8 (44)	def. by	North Melbourne 12.10 (82)	Patersons Stadium (crowd: 35,914)	Match report
In recognition of the AFL's Indigenous Round, all eighteen clubs produced and wore once-off indigenous-themed guernseys, each designed by indigenous artists local to or connected with the club.; Geelong suffered its first loss by 100 points or more since round 8, 2006.

=== Round 12 ===
	Round 12
Friday, 6 June (7:50 pm)	Geelong 16.11 (107)	def.	Carlton 15.12 (102)	Etihad Stadium (crowd: 36,952)	Match report
Saturday, 7 June (1:40 pm)	Hawthorn 19.9 (123)	def.	West Coast 12.7 (79)	Aurora Stadium (crowd: 15,504)	Match report
Saturday, 7 June (4:10 pm)	Port Adelaide 19.15 (129)	def.	St Kilda 9.5 (59)	Adelaide Oval (crowd: 42,374)	Match report
Saturday, 7 June (7:40 pm)	Greater Western Sydney 9.12 (66)	def. by	Essendon 11.15 (81)	Spotless Stadium (crowd: 8,429)	Match report
Saturday, 7 June (7:40 pm)	Western Bulldogs 13.9 (87)	def. by	Brisbane Lions 14.11 (95)	Etihad Stadium (crowd: 18,054)	Match report
Sunday, 8 June (3:20 pm)	Gold Coast 10.14 (74)	def. by	Sydney 17.7 (109)	Metricon Stadium (crowd: 21,354)	Match report
Sunday, 8 June (2:10 pm)	Fremantle 12.18 (90)	def.	Adelaide 7.8 (50)	Patersons Stadium (crowd: 35,389)	Match report
Sunday, 8 June (7:10 pm)	North Melbourne 17.14 (116)	def.	Richmond 13.10 (88)	Etihad Stadium (crowd: 32,977)	Match report
Monday, 9 June (3:20 pm)	Melbourne 3.10 (28)	def. by	Collingwood 8.13 (61)	MCG (crowd: 68,130)	Match report
Melbourne scored its lowest total against Collingwood since 1960.

=== Round 13 ===
	Round 13
Friday, 13 June (7:50 pm)	Carlton 13.12 (90)	def. by	Hawthorn 18.10 (118)	MCG (crowd: 49,624)	Match report
Saturday, 14 June (1:45 pm)	Richmond 12.13 (85)	def. by	Fremantle 16.9 (105)	MCG (crowd: 22,083)	Match report
Saturday, 14 June (2:10 pm)	Sydney 14.14 (98)	def.	Port Adelaide 13.16 (94)	SCG (crowd: 41,317)	Match report
Saturday, 14 June (2:40 pm)	West Coast 15.13 (103)	def.	Gold Coast 15.10 (100)	Patersons Stadium (crowd: 32,942)	Match report
Saturday, 14 June (7:10 pm)	Adelaide 16.13 (109)	def.	North Melbourne 10.13 (73)	Adelaide Oval (crowd: 47,205)	Match report
Saturday, 14 June (7:40 pm)	Brisbane Lions 12.8 (80)	def. by	Greater Western Sydney 19.11 (125)	Gabba (crowd: 12,700)	Match report
Sunday, 15 June (1:10 pm)	Geelong 20.13 (133)	def.	St Kilda 5.7 (37)	Simonds Stadium (crowd: 25,180)	Match report
Sunday, 15 June (3:20 pm)	Collingwood 15.8 (98)	def. by	Western Bulldogs 16.10 (106)	Etihad Stadium (crowd: 28,339)	Match report
Sunday, 15 June (4:40 pm)	Essendon 10.17 (77)	def. by	Melbourne 12.6 (78)	MCG (crowd: 44,626)	Match report
Greater Western Sydney recorded its first ever victory away from home, breaking a 27-match away losing streak.; Owing in part to a redevelopment of the grandstands over the previous year, the match between Sydney and Port Adelaide drew the biggest football attendance at the SCG since 1997.

=== Round 14 ===
	Round 14
Friday, 20 June (7:50 pm)	Richmond 7.9 (51)	def. by	Sydney 9.8 (62)	MCG (crowd: 34,648)	Match report
Saturday, 21 June (1:15 pm)	Port Adelaide 19.14 (128)	def.	Western Bulldogs 8.8 (56)	Adelaide Oval (crowd: 34,258)	Match report
Saturday, 21 June (2:10 pm)	Hawthorn 17.13 (115)	def.	Collingwood 13.8 (86)	MCG (crowd: 70,516)	Match report
Saturday, 21 June (4:40 pm)	Gold Coast 17.16 (118)	def.	Geelong 11.12 (78)	Metricon Stadium (crowd: 18,236)	Match report
Saturday, 21 June (5:40 pm)	Fremantle 15.15 (105)	def.	Brisbane Lions 3.4 (22)	Patersons Stadium (crowd: 25,152)	Match report
Saturday, 21 June (7:40 pm)	Essendon 15.11 (101)	def.	Adelaide 14.8 (92)	Etihad Stadium (crowd: 30,948)	Match report
Sunday, 22 June (1:10 pm)	Greater Western Sydney 15.10 (100)	def.	Carlton 14.8 (92)	Spotless Stadium (crowd: 9,059)	Match report
Sunday, 22 June (3:20 pm)	St Kilda 10.10 (70)	def. by	West Coast 15.13 (103)	Etihad Stadium (crowd: 17,317)	Match report
Sunday, 22 June (4:40 pm)	Melbourne 10.6 (66)	def. by	North Melbourne 15.17 (107)	MCG (crowd: 26,615)	Match report

=== Round 15 ===
	Round 15
Friday, 27 June (7:50 pm)	Geelong 13.11 (89)	def.	Essendon 11.14 (80)	Etihad Stadium (crowd: 43,732)	Match report
Saturday, 28 June (1:45 pm)	Hawthorn 17.14 (116)	def.	Gold Coast 10.3 (63)	Aurora Stadium (crowd: 13,178)	Match report
Saturday, 28 June (2:10 pm)	St Kilda 11.7 (73)	def. by	Richmond 18.9 (117)	Etihad Stadium (crowd: 28,487)	Match report
Saturday, 28 June (2:40 pm)	Fremantle 13.10 (88)	def.	West Coast 11.15 (81)	Patersons Stadium (crowd: 40,490)	Match report
Saturday, 28 June (7:40 pm)	Brisbane Lions 10.10 (70)	def.	North Melbourne 9.12 (66)	Gabba (crowd: 15,862)	Match report
Saturday, 28 June (7:40 pm)	Sydney 15.16 (106)	def.	Greater Western Sydney 8.12 (60)	SCG (crowd: 27,778)	Match report
Sunday, 29 June (1:10 pm)	Western Bulldogs 14.7 (91)	def.	Melbourne 13.7 (85)	Etihad Stadium (crowd: 24,953)	Match report
Sunday, 29 June (3:40 pm)	Adelaide 14.15 (99)	def.	Port Adelaide 10.16 (76)	Adelaide Oval (crowd: 50,552)	Match report
Sunday, 29 June (7:10 pm)	Collingwood 13.13 (91)	def.	Carlton 11.10 (76)	MCG (crowd: 40,936)	Match report
The attendance of 40,936 for the Collingwood vs Carlton was the lowest for a match between the two clubs at the Melbourne Cricket Ground since matches between them were first regularly moved to the ground and away from the clubs' small suburban grounds in 1986; the unconventional Sunday night timeslot, which was unpopular with fans, was the main reason for the weak attendance.

=== Round 16 ===
	Round 16
Friday, 4 July (7:50 pm)	North Melbourne 16.12 (108)	def.	Hawthorn 13.10 (88)	Etihad Stadium (crowd: 35,025)	Match report
Saturday, 5 July (1:45 pm)	Richmond 12.7 (79)	def.	Brisbane Lions 7.12 (54)	MCG (crowd: 34,577)	Match report
Saturday, 5 July (2:10 pm)	Greater Western Sydney 9.18 (72)	def. by	Adelaide 20.20 (140)	Spotless Stadium (crowd: 8,383)	Match report
Saturday, 5 July (4:40 pm)	Gold Coast 11.14 (80)	def.	Collingwood 10.15 (75)	Metricon Stadium (crowd: 24,032)	Match report
Saturday, 5 July (7:10 pm)	Port Adelaide 7.18 (60)	def. by	Essendon 8.14 (62)	Adelaide Oval (crowd: 46,786)	Match report
Saturday, 5 July (7:10 pm)	Melbourne 4.10 (34)	def. by	Fremantle 15.7 (97)	TIO Stadium (crowd: 9,290)	Match report
Sunday, 6 July (1:10 pm)	Carlton 24.7 (151)	def.	St Kilda 10.6 (66)	Etihad Stadium (crowd: 29,297)	Match report
Sunday, 6 July (1:20 pm)	West Coast 7.9 (51)	def. by	Sydney 10.19 (79)	Patersons Stadium (crowd: 25,076)	Match report
Sunday, 6 July (4:40 pm)	Geelong 10.9 (69)	def.	Western Bulldogs 7.14 (56)	Simonds Stadium (crowd: 24,766)	Match report
As of June 2025, the attendance of 24,032 at the Gold Coast vs Collingwood match is the largest AFL crowd to attend a game in Metricon Stadium's history.

=== Round 17 ===
	Round 17
Friday, 11 July (7:20 pm)	Adelaide 14.8 (92)	def. by	Hawthorn 15.14 (104)	Adelaide Oval (crowd: 50,321)	Match report
Saturday, 12 July (1:45 pm)	Melbourne 5.6 (36)	def. by	Geelong 14.18 (102)	MCG (crowd: 36,385)	Match report
Saturday, 12 July (2:10 pm)	North Melbourne 13.14 (92)	def.	St Kilda 3.15 (33)	Blundstone Arena (crowd: 10,641)	Match report
Saturday, 12 July (4:40 pm)	Western Bulldogs 13.16 (94)	def.	Gold Coast 9.12 (66)	Cazaly's Stadium (crowd: 9,746)	Match report
Saturday, 12 July (7:40 pm)	Sydney 18.14 (122)	def.	Carlton 7.9 (51)	SCG (crowd: 34,965)	Match report
Saturday, 12 July (7:40 pm)	Brisbane Lions 9.10 (64)	def. by	West Coast 11.10 (76)	Gabba (crowd: 13,610)	Match report
Sunday, 13 July (1:10 pm)	Richmond 19.12 (126)	def.	Port Adelaide 16.10 (106)	Etihad Stadium (crowd: 21,483)	Match report
Sunday, 13 July (3:20 pm)	Essendon 16.7 (103)	def.	Collingwood 5.9 (39)	MCG (crowd: 58,996)	Match report
Sunday, 13 July (2:40 pm)	Fremantle 21.10 (136)	def.	Greater Western Sydney 9.6 (60)	Patersons Stadium (crowd: 33,597)	Match report

=== Round 18 ===
	Round 18 (split round)
Friday, 18 July (7:50 pm)	Carlton 16.13 (109)	def.	North Melbourne 13.8 (86)	Etihad Stadium (crowd: 36,689)	Match report
Saturday, 19 July (4:40 pm)	St Kilda 17.16 (118)	def.	Fremantle 9.6 (60)	Etihad Stadium (crowd: 16,594)	Match report
Saturday, 19 July (7:40 pm)	Greater Western Sydney 12.15 (87)	def. by	Geelong 13.16 (94)	Spotless Stadium (crowd: 7,697)	Match report
Sunday, 20 July (12:40 pm)	Port Adelaide 10.12 (72)	def.	Melbourne 10.9 (69)	Adelaide Oval (crowd: 37,894)	Match report
Sunday, 20 July (4:40 pm)	Western Bulldogs 14.10 (94)	def. by	Essendon 15.11 (101)	Etihad Stadium (crowd: 34,476)	Match report
Friday, 25 July (6:40 pm)	West Coast 6.6 (42)	def. by	Richmond 8.11 (59)	Patersons Stadium (crowd: 32,270)	Match report
Saturday, 26 July (4:40 pm)	Brisbane Lions 16.14 (110)	def.	Gold Coast 8.8 (56)	Gabba (crowd: 27,167)	Match report
Saturday, 26 July (7:40 pm)	Hawthorn 15.14 (104)	def.	Sydney 13.16 (94)	MCG (crowd: 72,768)	Match report
Sunday, 27 July (4:40 pm)	Collingwood 12.10 (82)	def. by	Adelaide 14.14 (98)	MCG (crowd: 41,486)	Match report
Hawthorn defeated Sydney, ending Sydney's twelve-match winning streak, a streak which equaled the club's record set in 1935.

=== Round 19 ===
	Round 19
Thursday, 31 July (6:10 pm)	Fremantle 12.11 (83)	def.	Carlton 11.12 (78)	Patersons Stadium (crowd: 35,401)	Match report
Friday, 1 August (7:50 pm)	Sydney 11.13 (79)	def.	Essendon 8.9 (57)	SCG (crowd: 36,804)	Match report
Saturday, 2 August (1:10 pm)	Adelaide 16.9 (105)	def. by	West Coast 20.16 (136)	Adelaide Oval (crowd: 49,470)	Match report
Saturday, 2 August (4:40 pm)	Richmond 13.11 (89)	def.	Greater Western Sydney 8.14 (62)	MCG (crowd: 23,095)	Match report
Saturday, 2 August (7:40 pm)	North Melbourne 10.19 (79)	def. by	Geelong 16.15 (111)	Etihad Stadium (crowd: 32,564)	Match report
Saturday, 2 August (7:40 pm)	Gold Coast 17.15 (117)	def.	St Kilda 9.10 (64)	Metricon Stadium (crowd: 12,027)	Match report
Sunday, 3 August (1:10 pm)	Melbourne 6.15 (51)	def. by	Brisbane Lions 11.8 (74)	Etihad Stadium (crowd: 18,079)	Match report
Sunday, 3 August (3:20 pm)	Hawthorn 16.11 (107)	def.	Western Bulldogs 6.9 (45)	Aurora Stadium (crowd: 14,187)	Match report
Sunday, 3 August (4:40 pm)	Collingwood 11.10 (76)	def.	Port Adelaide 10.10 (70)	MCG (crowd: 32,807)	Match report

=== Round 20 ===
	Round 20
Friday, 8 August (7:50 pm)	Richmond 14.11 (95)	def.	Essendon 11.11 (77)	MCG (crowd: 58,032)	Match report
Saturday, 9 August (1:45 pm)	Greater Western Sydney 7.9 (51)	def. by	North Melbourne 19.12 (126)	StarTrack Oval (crowd: 10,211)	Match report
Saturday, 9 August (2:10 pm)	Carlton 14.13 (97)	def.	Gold Coast 8.10 (58)	Etihad Stadium (crowd: 28,840)	Match report
Saturday, 9 August (4:40 pm)	Hawthorn 17.13 (115)	def.	Melbourne 9.11 (65)	MCG (crowd: 37,088)	Match report
Saturday, 9 August (7:40 pm)	Geelong 12.9 (81)	def.	Fremantle 11.13 (79)	Simonds Stadium (crowd: 26,855)	Match report
Saturday, 9 August (7:10 pm)	Port Adelaide 7.16 (58)	def. by	Sydney 12.12 (84)	Adelaide Oval (crowd: 50,087)	Match report
Sunday, 10 August (1:10 pm)	Brisbane Lions 9.9 (63)	def. by	Adelaide 25.18 (168)	Gabba (crowd: 19,657)	Match report
Sunday, 10 August (3:20 pm)	St Kilda 15.9 (99)	def. by	Western Bulldogs 18.14 (122)	Etihad Stadium (crowd: 30,095)	Match report
Sunday, 10 August (2:40 pm)	West Coast 19.12 (126)	def.	Collingwood 10.6 (66)	Patersons Stadium (crowd: 36,458)	Match report
The Brisbane Lions suffered their worst ever defeat at the Gabba, losing by 105 points.

=== Round 21 ===
	Round 21
Friday, 15 August (7:50 pm)	Carlton 11.10 (76)	def. by	Geelong 11.16 (82)	Etihad Stadium (crowd: 38,812)	Match report
Saturday, 16 August (1:45 pm)	Sydney 19.13 (127)	def.	St Kilda 8.8 (56)	SCG (crowd: 31,361)	Match report
Saturday, 16 August (2:10 pm)	Gold Coast 7.5 (47)	def. by	Port Adelaide 7.14 (56)	Metricon Stadium (crowd: 10,042)	Match report
Saturday, 16 August (4:40 pm)	Essendon 11.11 (77)	def.	West Coast 11.8 (74)	Etihad Stadium (crowd: 35,905)	Match report
Saturday, 16 August (7:10 pm)	Adelaide 9.15 (69)	def. by	Richmond 10.19 (79)	Adelaide Oval (crowd: 50,459)	Match report
Saturday, 16 August (7:40 pm)	Collingwood 8.8 (56)	def. by	Brisbane Lions 18.15 (123)	MCG (crowd: 32,929)	Match report
Sunday, 17 August (1:10 pm)	North Melbourne 16.15 (111)	def.	Western Bulldogs 8.13 (61)	Etihad Stadium (crowd: 27,164)	Match report
Sunday, 17 August (3:20 pm)	Melbourne 3.16 (34)	def. by	Greater Western Sydney 15.8 (98)	MCG (crowd: 17,227)	Match report
Sunday, 17 August (2:40 pm)	Fremantle 17.8 (110)	def.	Hawthorn 13.13 (91)	Patersons Stadium (crowd: 38,506)	Match report
Greater Western Sydney won in Melbourne for the first time after 12 attempts.

=== Round 22 ===
	Round 22
Friday, 22 August (7:20 pm)	Port Adelaide 20.20 (140)	def.	Carlton 5.7 (37)	Adelaide Oval (crowd: 52,505)	Match report
Saturday, 23 August (1:45 pm)	North Melbourne 14.17 (101)	def.	Adelaide 13.16 (94)	Blundstone Arena (crowd: 10,702)	Match report
Saturday, 23 August (2:10 pm)	Essendon 16.12 (108)	def.	Gold Coast 13.11 (89)	Etihad Stadium (crowd: 33,281)	Match report
Saturday, 23 August (4:40 pm)	Greater Western Sydney 9.13 (67)	def. by	Collingwood 11.9 (75)	Spotless Stadium (crowd: 10,851)	Match report
Saturday, 23 August (7:40 pm)	Hawthorn 14.10 (94)	def.	Geelong 11.5 (71)	MCG (crowd: 72,216)	Match report
Saturday, 23 August (5:40 pm)	West Coast 18.11 (119)	def.	Melbourne 8.5 (53)	Patersons Stadium (crowd: 35,083)	Match report
Sunday, 24 August (1:10 pm)	Brisbane Lions 6.12 (48)	def. by	Fremantle 15.16 (106)	Gabba (crowd: 17,473)	Match report
Sunday, 24 August (3:20 pm)	Western Bulldogs 9.13 (67)	def. by	Sydney 20.10 (130)	Etihad Stadium (crowd: 22,430)	Match report
Sunday, 24 August (4:40 pm)	Richmond 15.8 (98)	def.	St Kilda 10.12 (72)	MCG (crowd: 47,200)	Match report
Richmond won eight games in a row for the first time since 1980.; Sydney won its 17th game of the season, setting a new club record for most wins in a home-and-away season.

=== Round 23 ===
	Round 23
Friday, 29 August (7:50 pm)	Collingwood 8.8 (56)	def. by	Hawthorn 18.13 (121)	MCG (crowd: 48,980)	Match report
Saturday, 30 August (1:45 pm)	Carlton 14.6 (90)	drew with	Essendon 13.12 (90)	MCG (crowd: 56,663)	Match report
Saturday, 30 August (1:10 pm)	Fremantle 16.9 (105)	def.	Port Adelaide 14.13 (97)	Patersons Stadium (crowd: 38,290)	Match report
Saturday, 30 August (4:40 pm)	Sydney 9.11 (65)	def. by	Richmond 10.8 (68)	ANZ Stadium (crowd: 31,227)	Match report
Saturday, 30 August (7:40 pm)	Geelong 21.17 (143)	def.	Brisbane Lions 12.9 (81)	Simonds Stadium (crowd: 24,659)	Match report
Saturday, 30 August (7:40 pm)	North Melbourne 19.9 (123)	def.	Melbourne 14.9 (93)	Etihad Stadium (crowd: 17,174)	Match report
Sunday, 31 August (1:10 pm)	Gold Coast 15.9 (99)	def. by	West Coast 23.13 (151)	Metricon Stadium (crowd: 11,840)	Match report
Sunday, 31 August (2:50 pm)	Adelaide 22.9 (141)	def.	St Kilda 9.8 (62)	Adelaide Oval (crowd: 44,969)	Match report
Sunday, 31 August (4:40 pm)	Western Bulldogs 15.19 (109)	def. by	Greater Western Sydney 18.7 (115)	Etihad Stadium (crowd: 14,725)	Match report
Collingwood missed the finals for the first time since 2005, ending the longest active finals streak of any team entering this season.; Richmond became the first team to make the finals from a win–loss record of 3-10 after 13 matches.

== Win/loss table ==
Team	1	2	3	4	5	6	7	8	9	10	11	12	13	14	15	16	17	18	19	20	21	22	23	F1	F2	F3	GF	Ladder
Adelaide	Geel −38	PA −54	**Syd** **−63**	StK +86	**GWS** **+65**	WB +9	**Melb** **−3**	X	**Coll** **+21**	Carl −5	**GCS** **+32**	Frem −40	**NM** **+36**	Ess −9	**PA** **+23**	GWS +68	**Haw** **−12**	Coll +16	**WCE** **−31**	BL +105	**Rich** **−10**	NM −7	**StK** **+79**	X	X	X	X	10
Brisbane Lions	Haw −48	**Geel** **−25**	GCS −53	PA −113	**Rich** **−43**	StK +3	**Syd** **−79**	**Ess** **−8**	NM −87	X	**Carl** **+7**	WB +8	**GWS** **−45**	Frem −83	**NM** **+4**	Rich −25	**WCE** **−12**	**GCS** **+54**	Melb +23	**Adel** **−105**	Coll +67	**Frem** **−58**	Geel +62	X	X	X	X	15
Carlton	**PA** **−33**	Rich −12	Ess −81	**Melb** **−23**	WB +28	**WCE** **+3**	**Coll** **−34**	StK +32	X	**Adel** **+5**	BL −7	Geel −5	**Haw** **−28**	GWS −8	Coll −15	**StK** **+85**	Syd −71	**NM** **+23**	Frem −5	**GCS** **+39**	**Geel** **−6**	PA −103	**Ess**; **0**	X	X	X	X	13
Collingwood	**Frem** **−70**	Syd +20	**Geel** **−11**	Rich +38	**NM** **+35**	**Ess** **+23**	Carl +34	X	Adel −21	**WCE** **+8**	StK +86	Melb +33	**WB** **−8**	Haw −29	**Carl** **+15**	GCS −5	Ess −64	**Adel** **−16**	**PA** **+6**	WCE −60	**BL** **−67**	GWS +8	**Haw** **−65**	X	X	X	X	11
Essendon	NM +39	**Haw** **−4**	**Carl** **+81**	Frem −53	**StK** **−16**	Coll −23	**WB** **+8**	BL +8	**Syd** **−50**	X	**Rich** **+50**	GWS +15	**Melb** **−1**	**Adel** **+9**	Geel −9	PA +2	**Coll** **+64**	WB +7	Syd −22	Rich −18	**WCE** **+3**	**GCS** **+19**	Carl; 0	NM −12	X	X	X	**7**
Fremantle	Coll +70	**GCS** **+48**	Haw −58	**Ess** **+53**	Syd −17	**NM** **−13**	WCE +19	PA −18	**Geel** **+32**	X	WB +38	**Adel** **+40**	Rich +20	**BL** **+83**	**WCE** **+7**	Melb +63	**GWS** **+76**	StK −58	**Carl** **+5**	Geel −2	**Haw** **+19**	BL +58	**PA** **+8**	Syd −24	**PA** **−22**	X	X	**4**
Geelong	**Adel** **+38**	BL +25	Coll +11	**WCE** **+75**	**Haw** **+19**	PA −40	**Rich** **+5**	X	Frem −32	**NM** **+20**	Syd −110	**Carl** **+5**	**StK** **+96**	GCS −40	**Ess** **+9**	**WB** **+13**	Melb +66	GWS +7	NM +32	**Frem** **+2**	Carl +6	Haw −23	**BL** **+62**	Haw −36	**NM** **−6**	X	X	**3**
Gold Coast	**Rich** **+18**	Frem −48	**BL** **+53**	**Haw** **−99**	Melb +8	**GWS** **+40**	NM +43	X	StK +38	**WB** **+45**	Adel −32	**Syd** **−35**	WCE −3	**Geel** **+40**	Haw −53	**Coll** **+5**	WB −28	BL −54	**StK** **+53**	Carl −39	**PA** **−9**	Ess −19	**WCE** **−52**	X	X	X	X	12
Greater Western Sydney	**Syd** **+32**	StK −7	**Melb** **+32**	**WB** **−27**	Adel −65	GCS −40	**PA** **−35**	WCE −111	X	**Rich** **−113**	Haw −7	**Ess** **−15**	BL +45	**Carl** **+8**	Syd −46	**Adel** **−68**	Frem −76	**Geel** **−7**	Rich −27	**NM** **−75**	Melb +64	**Coll** **−8**	WB +6	X	X	X	X	16
Hawthorn	**BL** **+48**	Ess +4	**Frem** **+58**	GCS +99	Geel −19	Rich +66	**StK** **+145**	Syd −19	X	PA −14	**GWS** **+7**	**WCE** **+44**	Carl +28	**Coll** **+29**	**GCS** **+53**	NM −20	Adel +12	**Syd** **+10**	**WB** **+62**	**Melb** **+50**	Frem −19	**Geel** **+23**	Coll +65	**Geel** **+36**	X	**PA** **+3**	Syd +63	**2**
Melbourne	StK −17	**WCE** **−93**	GWS −32	Carl +23	**GCS** **−8**	**Syd** **−31**	Adel +3	**WB** **−16**	Rich +17	X	**PA** **−20**	**Coll** **−33**	Ess +1	**NM** **−41**	WB −6	**Frem** **−63**	**Geel** **−66**	PA −3	**BL** **−23**	Haw −50	**GWS** **−64**	WCE −66	NM −30	X	X	X	X	17
North Melbourne	**Ess** **−39**	WB +29	**PA** **+7**	Syd +43	Coll −35	Frem +13	**GCS** **−43**	X	**BL** **+87**	Geel −20	WCE +38	**Rich** **+28**	Adel −36	Melb +41	BL −4	**Haw** **+20**	**StK** **+59**	Carl −23	**Geel** **−32**	GWS +75	**WB** **+50**	**Adel** **+7**	**Melb** **+30**	**Ess** **+12**	Geel +6	Syd −71	X	**6**
Port Adelaide	Carl +33	**Adel** **+54**	NM −7	**BL** **+113**	WCE +14	**Geel** **+40**	GWS +35	**Frem** **+18**	X	**Haw** **+14**	Melb +20	**StK** **+70**	Syd −4	**WB** **+72**	Adel −23	**Ess** **−2**	Rich −20	**Melb** **+3**	Coll −6	**Syd** **−26**	GCS +9	**Carl** **+103**	Frem −8	**Rich** **+57**	Frem +22	Haw −3	X	**5**
Richmond	GCS −18	**Carl** **+12**	WB −2	**Coll** **−38**	BL +43	**Haw** **−66**	Geel −5	X	**Melb** **−17**	GWS +113	Ess −50	NM −28	**Frem** **−20**	**Syd** **−11**	StK +44	**BL** **+25**	**PA** **+20**	WCE +17	**GWS** **+27**	**Ess** **+18**	Adel +10	**StK** **+26**	Syd +3	PA −57	X	X	X	**8**
St Kilda	**Melb** **+17**	**GWS** **+7**	WCE −25	**Adel** **−86**	Ess +16	**BL** **−3**	Haw −145	**Carl** **−32**	**GCS** **−38**	X	**Coll** **−86**	PA −70	Geel −96	**WCE** **−33**	**Rich** **−44**	Carl −85	NM −59	**Frem** **+58**	GCS −53	**WB** **−23**	Syd −71	Rich −26	Adel −79	X	X	X	X	18
Sydney	GWS −32	**Coll** **−20**	Adel +63	**NM** **−43**	**Frem** **+17**	Melb +31	BL +79	**Haw** **+19**	Ess +50	X	**Geel** **+110**	GCS +35	**PA** **+4**	Rich +11	**GWS** **+46**	WCE +28	**Carl** **+71**	Haw −10	**Ess** **+22**	PA +26	**StK** **+71**	WB +63	**Rich** **−3**	**Frem** **+24**	X	**NM** **+71**	**Haw** **−63**	**1**
West Coast	**WB** **+65**	Melb +93	**StK** **+25**	Geel −75	**PA** **−14**	Carl −3	**Frem** **−19**	**GWS** **+111**	X	Coll −8	**NM** **−38**	Haw −44	**GCS** **+3**	StK +33	Frem −7	**Syd** **−28**	BL +12	**Rich** **−17**	Adel +31	**Coll** **+60**	Ess −3	**Melb** **+66**	GCS +52	X	X	X	X	9
Western Bulldogs	WCE −65	**NM** **−29**	**Rich** **+2**	GWS +27	**Carl** **−28**	**Adel** **−9**	Ess −8	Melb +16	X	GCS −45	**Frem** **−38**	**BL** **−8**	Coll +8	PA −72	**Melb** **+6**	Geel −13	**GCS** **+28**	**Ess** **−7**	Haw −62	StK +23	NM −50	**Syd** **−63**	**GWS** **−6**	X	X	X	X	14
Team	1	2	3	4	5	6	7	8	9	10	11	12	13	14	15	16	17	18	19	20	21	22	23	F1	F2	F3	GF	Ladder

+	Win	Qualified for finals
−	Loss	Eliminated

Bold – Home game
X – Bye
Opponent for round listed above margin

== Ladder ==
2014 AFL ladder
Pos	Team	Pld	W	L	D	PF	PA	PP	Pts	
1	Sydney	22	17	5	0	2126	1488	142.9	68	Finals series
2	Hawthorn (P)	22	17	5	0	2458	1746	140.8	68	Finals series
3	Geelong	22	17	5	0	2033	1787	113.8	68	Finals series
4	Fremantle	22	16	6	0	2029	1556	130.4	64	Finals series
5	Port Adelaide	22	14	8	0	2180	1678	129.9	56	Finals series
6	North Melbourne	22	14	8	0	2026	1731	117.0	56	Finals series
7	Essendon	22	12	9	1	1828	1719	106.3	50	Finals series
8	Richmond	22	12	10	0	1887	1784	105.8	48	Finals series
9	West Coast	22	11	11	0	2045	1750	116.9	44	
10	Adelaide	22	11	11	0	2175	1907	114.1	44	
11	Collingwood	22	11	11	0	1766	1876	94.1	44	
12	Gold Coast	22	10	12	0	1917	2045	93.7	40	
13	Carlton	22	7	14	1	1891	2107	89.7	30	
14	Western Bulldogs	22	7	15	0	1784	2177	81.9	28	
15	Brisbane Lions	22	7	15	0	1532	2212	69.3	28	
16	Greater Western Sydney	22	6	16	0	1780	2320	76.7	24	
17	Melbourne	22	4	18	0	1336	1954	68.4	16	
18	St Kilda	22	4	18	0	1480	2436	60.8	16	

Source: AFL Tables
Rules for classification: 1) points; 2) percentage; 3) number of points for.
(P) Premiers

=== Ladder progression ===
Numbers highlighted in green indicate that the team finished the round inside the top 8.
Numbers highlighted in blue indicates the team finished first on the ladder in that round.
Numbers highlighted in red indicates the team finished in last place on the ladder in that round.
Underlined numbers indicate that the team had a bye during that round.

Team ╲ Round	1	2	3	4	5	6	7	8	9	10	11	12	13	14	15	16	17	18	19	20	21	22	23
Sydney	0	0	4	4	8	12	16	20	24	24	28	32	36	40	44	48	52	52	56	60	64	68	68
Hawthorn	4	8	12	16	16	20	24	24	24	24	28	32	36	40	44	44	48	52	56	60	60	64	68
Geelong	4	8	12	16	20	20	24	24	24	28	28	32	36	36	40	44	48	52	56	60	64	64	68
Fremantle	4	8	8	12	12	12	16	16	20	20	24	28	32	36	40	44	48	48	52	52	56	60	64
Port Adelaide	4	8	8	12	16	20	24	28	28	32	36	40	40	44	44	44	44	48	48	48	52	56	56
North Melbourne	0	4	8	12	12	16	16	16	20	20	24	28	28	32	32	36	40	40	40	44	48	52	56
Essendon	4	4	8	8	8	8	12	16	16	16	20	24	24	28	28	32	36	40	40	40	44	48	50
Richmond	0	4	4	4	8	8	8	8	8	12	12	12	12	12	16	20	24	28	32	36	40	44	48
West Coast	4	8	12	12	12	12	12	16	16	16	16	16	20	24	24	24	28	28	32	36	36	40	44
Adelaide	0	0	0	4	8	12	12	12	16	16	20	20	24	24	28	32	32	36	36	40	40	40	44
Collingwood	0	4	4	8	12	16	20	20	20	24	28	32	32	32	36	36	36	36	40	40	40	44	44
Gold Coast	4	4	8	8	12	16	20	20	24	28	28	28	28	32	32	36	36	36	40	40	40	40	40
Carlton	0	0	0	0	4	8	8	12	12	16	16	16	16	16	16	20	20	24	24	28	28	28	30
Western Bulldogs	0	0	4	8	8	8	8	12	12	12	12	12	16	16	20	20	24	24	24	28	28	28	28
Brisbane Lions	0	0	0	0	0	4	4	4	4	4	8	12	12	12	16	16	16	20	24	24	28	28	28
Greater Western Sydney	4	4	8	8	8	8	8	8	8	8	8	8	12	16	16	16	16	16	16	16	20	20	24
Melbourne	0	0	0	4	4	4	8	8	12	12	12	12	16	16	16	16	16	16	16	16	16	16	16
St Kilda	4	8	8	8	12	12	12	12	12	12	12	12	12	12	12	12	12	16	16	16	16	16	16

== Finals series ==
Qualifying and elimination finals
6 Sep, ANZ Stadium
1	Sydney	13.15 (93)
4	Fremantle	10.9 (69)
7 Sep, Adelaide Oval
5	Port Adelaide	20.12 (132)
8	Richmond	11.9 (75)
6 Sep, MCG
6	North Melbourne	14.9 (93)
7	Essendon	12.9 (81)
5 Sep, MCG
2	Hawthorn	15.14 (104)
3	Geelong	10.8 (68)

Semi-finals
13 Sep, Patersons Stadium
Fremantle	11.17 (83)
Port Adelaide	15.15 (105)
12 Sep, MCG
Geelong	13.14 (92)
North Melbourne	14.14 (98)

Preliminary finals
19 Sep, ANZ Stadium
Sydney	19.22 (136)
North Melbourne	9.11 (65)
20 Sep, MCG
Hawthorn	15.7 (97)
Port Adelaide	13.16 (94)

Grand final
27 Sep, MCG
Sydney	11.8 (74)
Hawthorn	21.11 (137)

=== Week one ===
	Qualifying Finals
QF2: 5 September (7:50 pm)	Hawthorn 15.14 (104)	def.	Geelong 10.8 (68)	MCG (crowd: 74,757)	Match report
QF1: 6 September (2:45 pm)	Sydney 13.15 (93)	def.	Fremantle 10.9 (69)	ANZ Stadium (crowd: 35,998)	Match report

	Elimination Finals
EF2: 6 September (7:15 pm)	North Melbourne 14.9 (93)	def.	Essendon 12.9 (81)	MCG (crowd: 78,561)	Match report
EF1: 7 September (2:50 pm)	Port Adelaide 20.12 (132)	def.	Richmond 11.9 (75)	Adelaide Oval (crowd: 50,618)	Match report
Adelaide Oval hosted its first ever AFL finals match.

=== Week two ===
	Semi-finals
SF2: 12 September (7:50 pm)	Geelong 13.14 (92)	def. by	North Melbourne 14.14 (98)	MCG (crowd: 65,964)	Match report
SF1: 13 September (5:45 pm)	Fremantle 11.17 (83)	def. by	Port Adelaide 15.15 (105)	Patersons Stadium (crowd: 42,338)	Match report
Fremantle and Geelong were both eliminated in the semi-finals after having finished in the top four. It was the first time since 2007 that any top four team had been eliminated in the semi-final, and the first time since the introduction of this finals system in 2000 that two top four teams had been eliminated in the semi-finals in the same year.

=== Week three ===
	Preliminary Finals
PF1: 19 September (7:50 pm)	Sydney 19.22 (136)	def.	North Melbourne 9.11 (65)	ANZ Stadium (crowd: 48,029)	Match report
PF2: 20 September (4:45 pm)	Hawthorn 15.7 (97)	def.	Port Adelaide 13.16 (94)	MCG (crowd: 74,856)	Match report

=== Week four ===
	Grand Final
Saturday, 27 September (2:30 pm)	Sydney 11.8 (74)	def. by	Hawthorn 21.11 (137)	MCG (crowd: 99,460)	Match report

== Attendances ==
=== By club ===
2014 AFL attendances
Club	Total	Games	Avg. Per Game	Home Total	Home Games	Home Avg.
Adelaide	821,838	22	37,356	528,508	11	48,046
Brisbane Lions	470,353	22	21,380	217,088	11	19,735
Carlton	847,470	22	38,521	433,563	11	39,415
Collingwood	1,044,686	22	47,486	528,099	11	48,009
Essendon	1,056,441	23	45,932	495,741	11	45,067
Fremantle	766,103	24	31,921	395,319	11	35,938
Geelong	926,681	24	38,612	373,038	11	33,913
Gold Coast	458,510	22	20,841	177,017	11	16,092
Greater Western Sydney	353,824	22	16,083	101,491	11	9,226
Hawthorn	1,155,672	25	46,227	402,300	11	36,573
Melbourne	655,975	22	29,817	282,035	11	25,640
North Melbourne	809,870	25	32,395	268,661	11	24,424
Port Adelaide	941,630	25	37,665	488,006	11	44,364
Richmond	890,390	23	38,713	475,155	11	43,196
St Kilda	604,772	22	27,490	256,310	11	23,301
Sydney	916,825	25	36,673	358,541	11	32,595
West Coast	691,867	22	31,449	376,176	11	34,198
Western Bulldogs	532,197	22	24,191	244,923	11	22,266

=== By ground ===
Ground	Total	Games	Avg. Per Game
Adelaide Oval	1067132	23	46397
ANZ Stadium	182107	5	36421
Aurora Stadium	55299	4	13825
Blundstone Arena	21343	2	10672
Cazaly's Stadium	9746	1	9746
Etihad Stadium	1355560	48	28240
Gabba	217088	11	19735
MCG	2505366	50	50106
Metricon Stadium	177017	11	16092
Patersons Stadium	813833	23	35384
Simonds Stadium	177755	7	25394
Spotless Stadium	76868	8	9609
StarTrack Oval	24623	3	8208
Sydney Cricket Ground	260461	8	32558
TIO Stadium	9290	1	9290
TIO Traeger Park	5655	1	5655
Westpac Stadium	13409	1	13409

== Awards ==
- The Brownlow Medal was awarded to Matt Priddis of West Coast, who received 26 votes.
- The AFL Rising Star was awarded to Lewis Taylor of the Brisbane Lions, who received 39 votes.
- The Norm Smith Medal was awarded to Luke Hodge of Hawthorn
- The AFL Goal of the Year was awarded to Matthew White of Port Adelaide.
- The AFL Mark of the Year was awarded to Chad Wingard of Port Adelaide.
- The McClelland Trophy was awarded to Sydney for the first time since 1996.
- The Wooden Spoon was "awarded" to St Kilda for the first time since 2000.
- The AFL Players Association awards
  - The Leigh Matthews Trophy was awarded to Nat Fyfe of Fremantle.
  - The Robert Rose Award was awarded to Joel Selwood of Geelong for the third year in a row and fourth time overall.
  - The Best Captain was awarded to Luke Hodge of Hawthorn.
  - The Best First-Year Player was awarded to Marcus Bontempelli of the Western Bulldogs.
  - The 22under22 Team captaincy was awarded to Dyson Heppell of Essendon for the second year in a row.
- The AFL Coaches Association Awards
  - The Player of the Year Award was given to Robbie Gray of Port Adelaide, who received 111 votes.
  - The Allan Jeans Senior Coach of the Year Award was awarded to John Longmire of Sydney.
  - The Assistant Coach of the Year Award was awarded to Brett Montgomery of Western Bulldogs.
  - The Development Coach of the Year Award was awarded to Steven King of Western Bulldogs.
  - The Support Staff Leadership Award was awarded to John Kilby of Essendon.
  - The Lifetime Achievement Award was awarded to Neale Daniher.
  - The Best Young Player Award was awarded to Jaeger O'Meara of Gold Coast.
  - The Media Award was awarded to Gerard Whateley for his work on Fox Footy.
- The Jim Stynes Community Leadership Award was awarded to Beau Waters of West Coast.

=== Milestones ===
Name	Club	Milestone	Round
Jimmy Bartel	Geelong	250 AFL games	Round 1
Robert Murphy	Western Bulldogs	250 AFL games	Round 1
Josh Hunt	Greater Western Sydney	200 AFL games	Round 2
Nick Maxwell	Collingwood	200 AFL games	Round 2
Andrew Mackie	Geelong	200 AFL games	Round 2
David Hale	Hawthorn	200 AFL games	Round 3
Travis Cloke	Collingwood	200 AFL games	Round 4
Jonathan Brown	Brisbane Lions	250 AFL games	Round 5
Scott Thompson	Adelaide	250 AFL games	Round 5
Drew Petrie	North Melbourne	250 AFL games	Round 6
Shaun Burgoyne	Hawthorn	250 AFL games	Round 6
Sam Mitchell	Hawthorn	250 AFL games	Round 6
Jordan Lewis	Hawthorn	200 AFL games	Round 7
Rhyce Shaw	Sydney	200 AFL games	Round 7
Aaron Sandilands	Fremantle	200 AFL games	Round 7
Matthew Pavlich	Fremantle	300 AFL games	Round 9
Matthew Pavlich	Fremantle	600 AFL goals	Round 9
Brett Deledio	Richmond	200 AFL games	Round 10
Lance Franklin	Sydney	600 AFL goals	Round 11
Nick Riewoldt	St Kilda	600 AFL goals	Round 12
Mick Malthouse	Carlton	700 AFL games coached	Round 13
Brent Reilly	Adelaide	200 AFL games	Round 13
David Mundy	Fremantle	200 AFL games	Round 15
Eddie Betts	Adelaide	200 AFL games	Round 17
Jarryd Roughead	Hawthorn	200 AFL games	Round 18
James Kelly	Geelong	250 AFL games	Round 19
Ryan Griffen	Western Bulldogs	200 AFL games	Round 21
Lance Franklin	Sydney	200 AFL games	Round 21
Danyle Pearce	Fremantle	200 AFL games	Round 22
Chris Newman	Richmond	250 AFL games	Round 23
Brad Sewell	Hawthorn	200 AFL games	Qualifying Final
Adam Goodes	Sydney	350 AFL games	Preliminary Final
Luke Hodge	Hawthorn	250 AFL games	Grand Final

=== Coleman Medal ===
The Coleman Medal was awarded to Lance Franklin of Sydney, who kicked 67 goals during the home and away season.

Rank	Player	Goals
1	Lance Franklin	67
2	Jay Schulz	62
2	Tom Hawkins	62
2	Jarryd Roughead	62
5	Josh Kennedy	61
6	Jack Riewoldt	58
7	Luke Breust	53
8	Eddie Betts	51
8	Jack Gunston	51
10	Hayden Ballantyne	49
10	Nick Riewoldt	49

=== Best and fairest ===
Club	Award name	Player	Ref.
Adelaide	Malcolm Blight Medal	Daniel Talia	
Brisbane Lions	Merrett–Murray Medal	Tom Rockliff	
Carlton	John Nicholls Medal	Bryce Gibbs	
Collingwood	Copeland Trophy	Scott Pendlebury	
Essendon	Crichton Medal	Dyson Heppell	
Fremantle	Doig Medal	Nat Fyfe	
Geelong	Carji Greeves Medal	Joel Selwood	
Gold Coast	Club Champion	David Swallow	
Greater Western Sydney	Kevin Sheedy Medal	Shane Mumford	
Hawthorn	Peter Crimmins Medal	Jordan Lewis	
Melbourne	Keith 'Bluey' Truscott Medal	Nathan Jones	
North Melbourne	Syd Barker Medal	Ben Cunnington	
Port Adelaide	John Cahill Medal	Robbie Gray	
Richmond	Jack Dyer Medal	Trent Cotchin	
St Kilda	Trevor Barker Award	Nick Riewoldt	
Sydney	Bob Skilton Medal	Luke Parker	
West Coast	John Worsfold Medal	Eric Mackenzie	
Western Bulldogs	Charles Sutton Medal	Tom Liberatore	

== Club leadership ==
Club	Coach	Captain(s)	Vice-captain(s)	Leadership group
Adelaide	Brenton Sanderson	Nathan van Berlo	Patrick Dangerfield, Rory Sloane	Richard Douglas, Sam Jacobs, Scott Thompson, Taylor Walker
Brisbane Lions	Justin Leppitsch	Jed Adcock	Tom Rockliff	Daniel Merrett, Joel Patfull, Daniel Rich, Pearce Hanley, Matthew Leuenberger, Dayne Zorko, Jack Redden, Mitchell Golby
Carlton	Mick Malthouse	Marc Murphy	Andrew Carrazzo, Kade Simpson	Bryce Gibbs, Lachie Henderson, Michael Jamison, Brock McLean, Andrew Walker
Collingwood	Nathan Buckley	Scott Pendlebury		Nick Maxwell, Luke Ball, Nathan Brown, Lachlan Keeffe, Steele Sidebottom, Clinton Young, Travis Cloke
Essendon	Mark Thompson	Jobe Watson		Brendon Goddard, Dyson Heppell, Heath Hocking, Brent Stanton, Jason Winderlich, David Myers
Fremantle	Ross Lyon	Matthew Pavlich		Matt de Boer, David Mundy, Luke McPharlin, Aaron Sandilands, Lee Spurr
Gold Coast	Guy McKenna	Gary Ablett	Nathan Bock, Tom Lynch, Dion Prestia, Michael Rischitelli, David Swallow	
Greater Western Sydney	Leon Cameron	Phil Davis; Callan Ward	Heath Shaw, Tom Scully	Shane Mumford, Stephen Gilham
Geelong	Chris Scott	Joel Selwood	Harry Taylor	Mitch Duncan, Tom Hawkins, Steve Johnson, James Kelly, Andrew Mackie, Mathew Stokes
Hawthorn	Alastair Clarkson (Rds 1–10, 16–GF); Brendon Bolton (Rds 11–15)	Luke Hodge	Jordan Lewis, Jarryd Roughead	Sam Mitchell, Josh Gibson
Melbourne	Paul Roos	Jack Grimes; Nathan Jones		Mitch Clark (until 23 April 2014), James Frawley, Colin Garland, Jack Trengove, Lynden Dunn (from 23 April 2014), Daniel Cross (from 23 April 2014), Chris Dawes (from 23 April 2014)
North Melbourne	Brad Scott	Andrew Swallow	Drew Petrie, Jack Ziebell	Scott Thompson, Daniel Wells, Nick Dal Santo, Sam Gibson
Port Adelaide	Ken Hinkley	Travis Boak	Brad Ebert	Robbie Gray, Hamish Hartlett, Jackson Trengove, Angus Monfries, Matthew Lobbe, Tom Jonas
Richmond	Damien Hardwick	Trent Cotchin	Brett Deledio	Troy Chaplin, Daniel Jackson, Ivan Maric
St Kilda	Alan Richardson	Nick Riewoldt		David Armitage, Sean Dempster, Jarryn Geary, Leigh Montagna, Lenny Hayes
Sydney	John Longmire	Kieren Jack; Jarrad McVeigh		Adam Goodes, Josh Kennedy, Ryan O'Keefe, Ted Richards, Rhyce Shaw, Nick Smith, Ben McGlynn
West Coast	Adam Simpson	Darren Glass	Josh Kennedy, Scott Selwood	Dean Cox, Matt Priddis
Western Bulldogs	Brendan McCartney	Ryan Griffen		No official leadership group

== Club financials ==
2014 AFL membership figures
Club	Members	Change from 2013	% change from 2013	Revenue	Profit (loss)
Adelaide	54,249	▲7,844	▲16.90%	$39,366,673	($408,000)
Brisbane Lions	24,012	▼118	▼0.49%	$46,538,187	($3,543,138)
Carlton	47,485	▼3,079	▼6.09%	$56,641,156	($1,605,403)
Collingwood	79,347	▲920	▲1.17%	$76,819,714	$2,017,992
Essendon	60,646	▲4,473	▲7.96%	$61,258,047	$721,517
Fremantle	48,777	▲4,897	▲11.16%	$49,161,997	$215,279
Geelong	43,803	▲919	▲2.14%	$51,356,479	($251,207)
Gold Coast	13,478	▲976	▲7.81%	$33,798,618	$1,062,082
Greater Western Sydney	13,040	▲359	▲2.83%	$32,448,830	($529,315)
Hawthorn	68,650	▲5,297	▲8.36%	$53,603,479	$3,420,400
Melbourne	35,911	▲2,734	▲8.24%	$42,093,064	$284,557
North Melbourne	39,060	▲4,453	▲12.87%	$34,390,355	$42,419
Port Adelaide	48,968	▲9,130	▲22.92%	$48,219,475	($1,091,999)
Richmond	66,122	▲5,801	▲9.62%	$44,408,127	$1,329,530
St Kilda	30,739	▼1,938	▼6.02%	$30,235,195	($3,912,922)
Sydney	40,126	▲3,768	▲10.36%	$46,519,605	$846,871
West Coast	58,529	▲28	▲0.05%	$57,616,027	$4,657,635
Western Bulldogs	31,538	▲1,329	▲4.40%	$37,538,814	$329,945
Total	804,480	▲47,660	▲6.31%		

== Coach changes ==
Coach	Club	Date	Notes	Caretaker	New coach
Brenton Sanderson	Adelaide	17 September 2014	Sacked	None (end of regular season)	Phil Walsh
Guy McKenna	Gold Coast	1 October 2014	Sacked	None (end of regular season)	Rodney Eade
Brendan McCartney	Western Bulldogs	10 October 2014	Resigned	None (end of regular season)	Luke Beveridge

== Post-season ==
=== International Rules Series ===
The International Rules Series returned for 2014 at the later time of November. Ahead of the series, the AFL adopted a new rule permitting only those who had been selected in an All-Australian team in their careers playing for the Australian team. The series was also reduced to a single test match and several rule changes were made so as to enable greater participation from key position players in the AFL. Australia defeated Ireland by 10 points, 56–46, to claim their first win in International rules football since the 2010 series.

	2014 International Rules Test
Saturday, 22 November (5:45pm)	Australia 0.17.5 (56)	def.	Ireland 2.9.7 (46)	Patersons Stadium, Perth (crowd: 38,262)	Report
Jim Stynes Medal: Luke Hodge

== Notable events ==
- On 3 March 2014, it was announced that CEO of the AFL, Andrew Demetriou, would be resigning from the post following the conclusion of the season, after eleven years in the role. Gillon McLachlan was later named his successor.
- On 13 May 2014, Greater Western Sydney midfielder Toby Greene was charged with a number of offences including assault with a dangerous weapon and intentionally causing serious injury over an alleged assault in a Melbourne licensed venue the previous night. He was later suspended by the club for five weeks.
- Just a year after being racially abused in a match against Collingwood, Sydney's Adam Goodes was once again the target of a racial vilification, this time by an Essendon supporter. While the incident went unheard during the weekend, it only came to light on 20 May 2014; the Essendon club responded by terminating that supporter's membership.
- On 26 May 2014, Hawthorn head coach Alastair Clarkson was hospitalised after being diagnosed with Guillain–Barré syndrome. Brendon Bolton was appointed as the acting head coach for several matches while Clarkson recovered.
- As part of the ongoing investigation into the Essendon Football Club supplements controversy, on 13 June 2014, the Australian Sports Anti-Doping Authority (ASADA) issued show cause notices to 34 Essendon players from its 2012 list. In response, Essendon executives lodged a Federal Court application alleging that ASADA's joint investigation with the AFL was unlawful and in breach of the ASADA Act. On 19 September, Justice John Middleton ruled that ASADA's investigation was lawful, allowing ASADA to trigger the start of the show-cause response period, which gives charged players 14 days to answer doping allegations against them.
