= Don Kemp =

Australian rules footballer

Personal information
- Full name: Donald William Kemp
- Born: 21 July 1914; Kensington, Victoria
- Died: 22 April 1973 (aged 58); Kensington, Victoria
- Original team: South Kensington
- Height: 180 cm (5 ft 11 in)
- Weight: 85 kg (187 lb)

Playing career^{1}
Years	Club	Games (Goals)
1936–1943, 1946–1947	North Melbourne	99 (15)
- ^{1} Playing statistics correct to the end of 1947.

Donald William Kemp (21 July 1914 – 22 April 1973) was an Australian rules footballer who played with North Melbourne in the VFL. Kemp was North Melbourne's best and fairest winner in 1943 and when he retired in 1947 finished one game short of joining the 100-game club.
