= Charlie Skinner =

Australian rules footballer, born 1912

Personal information
- Full name: Charles W. Skinner
- Born: 2 January 1912
- Died: 26 November 1972 (aged 60)
- Original team: Maidstone/Braybrook
- Height: 170 cm (5 ft 7 in)
- Weight: 71 kg (157 lb)

Playing career^{1}
Years	Club	Games (Goals)
1933–1942	North Melbourne	114 (7)
- ^{1} Playing statistics correct to the end of 1942.

Charles Skinner (2 January 1912 – 26 November 1972) was an Australian rules footballer who played with North Melbourne in the Victorian Football League (VFL).

Skinner, a wingman, won North Melbourne's Best and Fairest award in 1936. He played for Braybrook after leaving North Melbourne.
