= George Kennedy (Australian footballer) =

Australian rules footballer

Personal information
- Full name: George Allan Kennedy
- Born: 5 May 1919; Footscray, Victoria
- Died: 24 October 1979 (aged 60); Geelong, Victoria
- Height: 193 cm (6 ft 4 in)
- Weight: 97 kg (214 lb)

Playing career^{1}
Years	Club	Games (Goals)
1937–1942, 1946–1948	North Melbourne	80 (124)
1948	South Melbourne	5 (5)
Total		85 (129)
- ^{1} Playing statistics correct to the end of 1948.

George Allan Kennedy (5 May 1919 – 24 October 1979) was an Australian rules footballer who played with North Melbourne in the VFL.

Kennedy had his best season in 1941, kicking 37 goals, finishing equal 6th in the Brownlow Medal count and winning North Melbourne's best and fairest.
