= Andrew Swallow =

Australian rules footballer (born 1987)

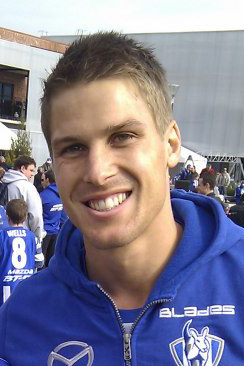
- Swallow in 2012

Personal information
- Full name: Andrew Swallow
- Nickname: Spitter
- Born: 2 June 1987 (age 39)
- Original team: East Fremantle (WAFL)
- Draft: No. 43, 2005 national draft
- Height: 183 cm (6 ft 0 in)
- Weight: 80 kg (176 lb)
- Position: Midfielder

Playing career^{1}
| Years | Club | Games (Goals) |
| 2006–2017 | North Melbourne | 224 (80) |

International team honours^{2}
| Years | Team | Games (Goals) |
| 2011 | Australia | 2 |
- ^{1} Playing statistics correct to the end of 2017.^{2} Representative statistics correct as of 2011.

Career highlights
- 3× Syd Barker Medal: 2009, 2011, 2012; North Melbourne captain: 2012–2016; 2006 AFL Rising Star Nomination

Andrew Swallow (born 2 June 1987) is a former professional Australian rules footballer who played for the North Melbourne Football Club in the Australian Football League (AFL). He was the captain of North Melbourne from 2012 to 2016 before retiring in 2017.

== AFL career ==
=== Recruitment ===
He was North Melbourne's third round draft selection in the 2005 AFL draft, number 43 overall, from the East Fremantle Football Club in the WAFL.

=== 2006 (debut) ===
He received a nomination for the NAB Rising Star for his performance against Geelong in Round 17, 2006 when he managed 28 possessions and a goal.

=== 2007 ===
Swallow's form improved during the 2007 season, consistently gaining high numbers of disposals each week. This culminated in the spectacular 1-point win over Melbourne in Round 9 in which he scored the winning goal.

=== 2008 ===
Swallow played the first 3 games in 2008, before being sent back to the VFL to work on his outside run and spread from the stoppages. After some positive performances at North Ballarat Roosters, he injured his ankle during a game and missed 7 weeks.

=== 2009 (Syd Barker Medallist) ===
But he was back to his best in 2009 returning to the side to be one of North's finest throughout the season. His disposal has notably improved, and he has worked on all aspects of his game to play every game, and is now recognised as a tackler and clearance player in the North Melbourne side, and the AFL. On 2 October 2009, Swallow was awarded the Syd Barker Medal by North Melbourne for being the club's best and fairest player for the year.

=== 2010 ===
He had another terrific season in 2010 playing all 22 games for the second consecutive season and finishing just one vote behind Brent Harvey and Brady Rawlings for the Syd Barker Medal.

=== 2011 ===
In 2011, he would have arguably his best season to date again playing every game and taking home his second Syd Barker Medal which he shared with Daniel Wells. He would also be one of four North Melbourne players selected in the 40 man All Australian squad however he missed out on being selected in the final 22. He would however be selected as part of the Australian squad for the International Rules series against Ireland.

=== 2012 ===
In February 2012, Swallow was announced captain of the North Melbourne Football Club, replacing Brent Harvey. As a captain, Andrew capped off the year to win the Syd Barker Medal with 60 votes, becoming a three time Syd Barker Medalist.

=== 2016 ===
In December 2016 it was announced that Jack Ziebell would take over the captaincy role at North Melbourne.

=== 2017 ===
By the conclusion of the 2017 season, Andrew Swallow announced his retirement from AFL

== Statistics ==
Statistics are correct to the end of round 9, 2016

Legend
| G | Goals | K | Kicks | D | Disposals | T | Tackles |
| B | Behinds | H | Handballs | M | Marks |

| Season | Team | No. | Games | Totals | | | | | | | Averages (per game) | | | | | | |
| Season | Team | No. | Games | G | B | K | H | D | M | T | G | B | K | H | D | M | T |
|---|---|---|---|---|---|---|---|---|---|---|---|---|---|---|---|---|---|
| 2006 | Kangaroos | 19 | 12 | 2 | 5 | 87 | 63 | 150 | 34 | 45 | 0.2 | 0.4 | 7.3 | 5.3 | 12.5 | 2.8 | 3.8 |
| 2007 | Kangaroos | 19 | 25 | 10 | 4 | 169 | 198 | 367 | 74 | 128 | 0.4 | 0.2 | 6.8 | 7.9 | 14.7 | 3.0 | 5.1 |
| 2008 | North Melbourne | 19 | 3 | 0 | 0 | 18 | 23 | 41 | 6 | 14 | 0.0 | 0.0 | 6.0 | 7.7 | 13.7 | 2.0 | 4.7 |
| 2009 | North Melbourne | 9 | 22 | 17 | 8 | 187 | 224 | 411 | 85 | 152 | 0.8 | 0.4 | 8.5 | 10.2 | 18.7 | 3.9 | 6.9 |
| 2010 | North Melbourne | 9 | 22 | 16 | 11 | 206 | 261 | 467 | 68 | 183 | 0.7 | 0.5 | 9.4 | 11.9 | 21.2 | 3.1 | 8.3 |
| 2011 | North Melbourne | 9 | 22 | 11 | 7 | 268 | 294 | 562 | 69 | 145 | 0.5 | 0.3 | 12.2 | 13.4 | 25.5 | 3.1 | 6.6 |
| 2012 | North Melbourne | 9 | 23 | 9 | 12 | 278 | 316 | 594 | 74 | 164 | 0.4 | 0.5 | 12.1 | 13.7 | 25.8 | 3.2 | 7.1 |
| 2013 | North Melbourne | 9 | 17 | 2 | 8 | 210 | 194 | 404 | 56 | 107 | 0.1 | 0.5 | 12.4 | 11.4 | 23.8 | 3.3 | 6.3 |
| 2014 | North Melbourne | 9 | 18 | 5 | 6 | 195 | 200 | 395 | 54 | 107 | 0.3 | 0.3 | 10.8 | 11.1 | 21.9 | 3.0 | 5.9 |
| 2015 | North Melbourne | 9 | 22 | 4 | 3 | 219 | 260 | 479 | 43 | 164 | 0.2 | 0.1 | 10.0 | 11.8 | 21.8 | 2.0 | 7.5 |
| 2016 | North Melbourne | 9 | 9 | 0 | 2 | 77 | 99 | 176 | 16 | 75 | 0.0 | 0.2 | 8.6 | 11.0 | 19.6 | 1.8 | 8.3 |
| Career | | | 195 | 76 | 66 | 1914 | 2132 | 4046 | 579 | 1284 | 0.4 | 0.3 | 9.8 | 10.9 | 20.7 | 3.0 | 6.6 |

== Personal life ==
Swallow is the older brother of Gold Coast Suns midfielder David Swallow, who was taken at pick #1 in the 2010 AFL draft. Swallow was born and raised in Western Australia attending Rehoboth Christian College. Swallow is a Christian.
