= Jade Rawlings =

Australian rules footballer, born 1977

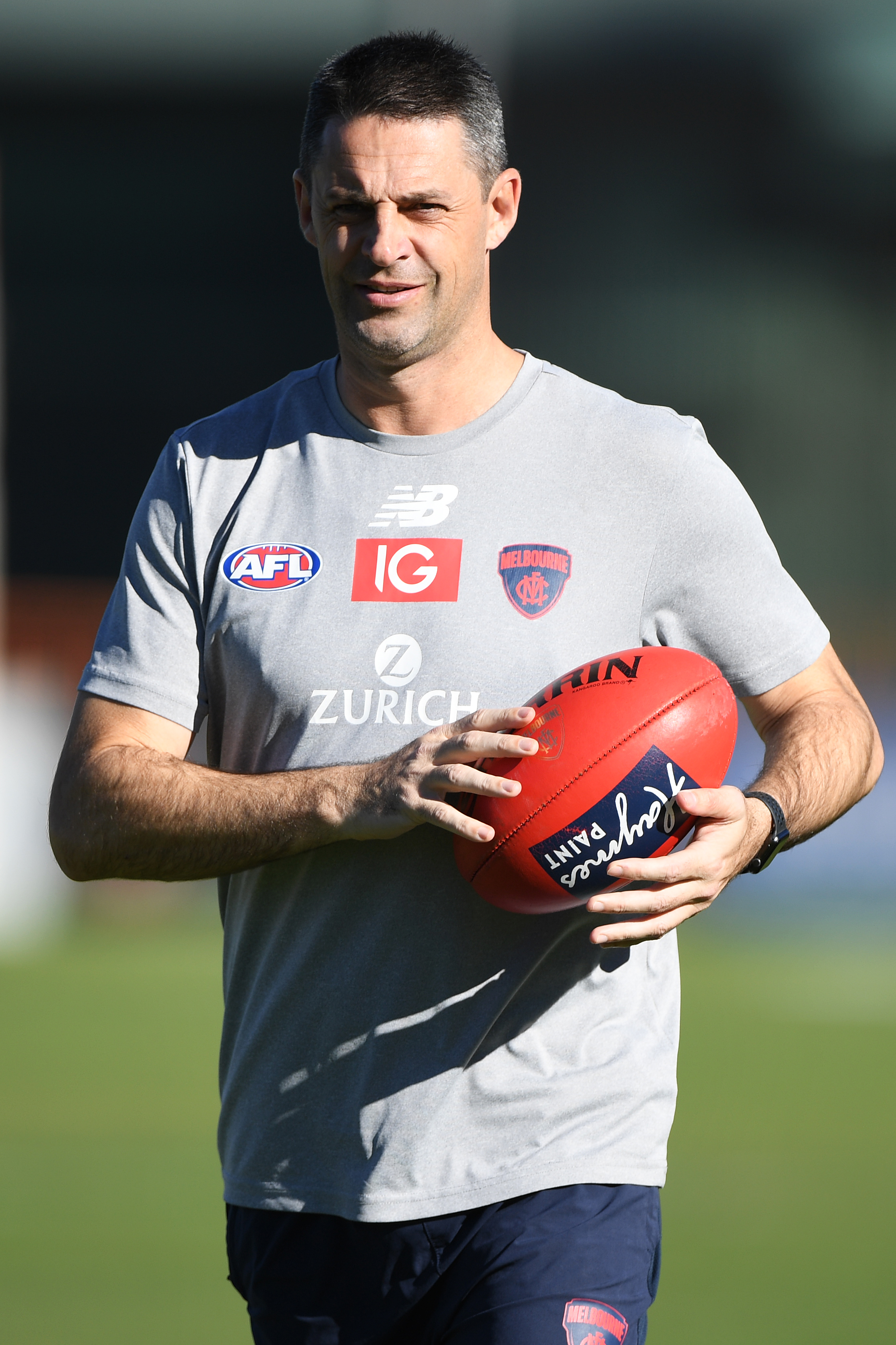
- Rawlings in July 2019

Personal information
- Full name: Jade Rawlings
- Born: 9 October 1977 (age 49); Devonport, Tasmania
- Original team: Devonport
- Draft: 94th overall, 1994 AFL draft 1st overall, 2004 Pre-season draft
- Height: 196 cm (6 ft 5 in)
- Weight: 97 kg (214 lb)
- Position: Defender/Forward

Playing career^{1}
| Years | Club | Games (Goals) |
| 1996–2003 | Hawthorn | 116 (62) |
| 2004–2005 | Western Bulldogs | 29 (32) |
| 2006 | Kangaroos | 3 (2) |
| Total | | 148 (96) |

International team honours^{2}
| Years | Team | Games (Goals) |
| 2003 | Australia | ? (?) |

Coaching career^{3}
| Years | Club | Games (W–L–D) |
| 2009 | Richmond | 11 (3–7–1) |
| 2021– | Norwood | 14 (8–6–1) |
- ^{1} Playing statistics correct to the end of 2006.^{2} Representative statistics correct as of 2003.^{3} Coaching statistics correct as of 2009.

Career highlights
- Western Bulldogs leading goalkicker: 2004; AFL Rising Star nominee: 1998; SANFL premiership coach: 2022

Jade Rawlings (born 9 October 1977) is a former Australian rules footballer who played for the Hawthorn Football Club, Western Bulldogs and North Melbourne Football Club in Australian Football League (AFL). He served as the caretaker coach of the Richmond Football Club for 11 games in 2009, and served as the senior coach for Norwood in the South Australian National Football League (SANFL) from 2020 to 2024.

Rawlings currently serves as backline coach for the Fremantle Football Club.

== Playing career ==
=== Hawthorn ===
Picked up very late in the 1994 AFL draft at pick 94 by the Hawthorn Football Club, Rawlings developed into a very handy key position defender and occasionally, forward. He racked up 116 games for the Hawks before going into a contractual dispute at the end of 2003.

=== Western Bulldogs ===
He was picked up at number 1 in the 2004 AFL pre-season draft by the Western Bulldogs, who needed a tall forward, even though Rawlings was probably more at home in the backline. On debut with his new club, in Round 1, 2004, Rawlings booted 7 goals. However, in what would be a sign of things to come, he missed a relatively simple shot that may have cost the Bulldogs the game.

Throughout 2004 Rawlings' kicking was woeful, sometimes kicking difficult goals along the boundary line but missing relatively simple goals (with a 50% accuracy rate). He was dropped to the VFL. In 2005 Rawlings did not fare much better, his knee troubles ruling him out for the Bulldogs after Round 14 of that year. Rawlings soon got into internal disputes at the club and was traded to his third club, the Kangaroos.

=== Kangaroos ===
Rawlings joined his brother Brady at the Kangaroos and this was believed to be one of the reasons for moving to the club.

After his recruitment, coach Dean Laidley did not guarantee Rawlings a senior game in 2006, saying he had to earn his spot. Jade played most of the year in 2006 with the Tasmanian Devils Football Club in the VFL showing some good form.

After playing just two games in the 2006 season, Rawlings announced that he would retire after the Round 21 game against one of his former clubs, Hawthorn, despite an interview on Before the Game the week prior which had little no hint of retirement, although he did say his "knees weren't too flash" – a problem which hampered him during the 2005 season.

His final game was played in his home state of Tasmania (at Aurora Stadium), a match where Rawlings was visibly emotional, as he was well respected by both the Hawthorn and Kangaroos sides.

== Coaching career ==
=== Richmond Football Club ===
For three seasons beginning in 2007 Rawlings was an assistant coach at the Richmond Football Club, under senior coach Terry Wallace, as well as senior coach at Richmond's VFL affiliate club, the Coburg Tigers. Part of the way through the 2009 season, he was replaced at Coburg by former Brisbane Lions player Craig McRae, when after Round 11, 2009, he was appointed caretaker senior coach of Richmond Football Club, following the resignation of Terry Wallace. His first game as Richmond caretaker senior coach was a victory against the West Coast Eagles. Rawlings was dubbed "The Blade" because of 5 cuts he made to the lineup for his first game as caretaker senior coach, including veteran Joel Bowden. Rawlings then led Richmond to three wins, one draw and seven losses of the remaining eleven games left in the 2009 season, to finish Richmond in fifteenth place (second-last) position on the ladder with a total of five wins, sixteen losses and one draw. However on 25 August 2009, at the end of the 2009 season, the Richmond Football Club appointed Damien Hardwick as their senior coach and Rawlings was not retained as Richmond Football Club senior coach for the 2010 season. Rawlings then left the Richmond Football Club at the end of the 2009 season.

=== Brisbane Lions ===
Rawlings was an assistant coach at the Brisbane Lions under senior coach Michael Voss for the 2010 and 2011 seasons.

=== Melbourne Football Club ===
Rawlings became an assistant coach in the role of the backline coach at Melbourne Football Club from the 2012 season. On 28 September 2017, Rawlings became senior coach of Casey Demons, Melbourne Football Club's reserves in the VFL League. Rawlings coached Casey Demons until midway through the 2019 season, before stepping down as senior coach of Casey Demons and being replaced by Sam Radford. Rawlings then returned back to Melbourne Football Club's AFL coaching panel as an assistant coach under senior coach Simon Goodwin. Rawlings then left Melbourne Football Club at the end of the 2019 season.

=== North Melbourne Football Club ===
Rawlings then became an assistant coach at North Melbourne Football Club under senior coach Rhyce Shaw for the 2020 season. Rawlings was then sacked by North Melbourne as an assistant coach at the end of the 2020 season.

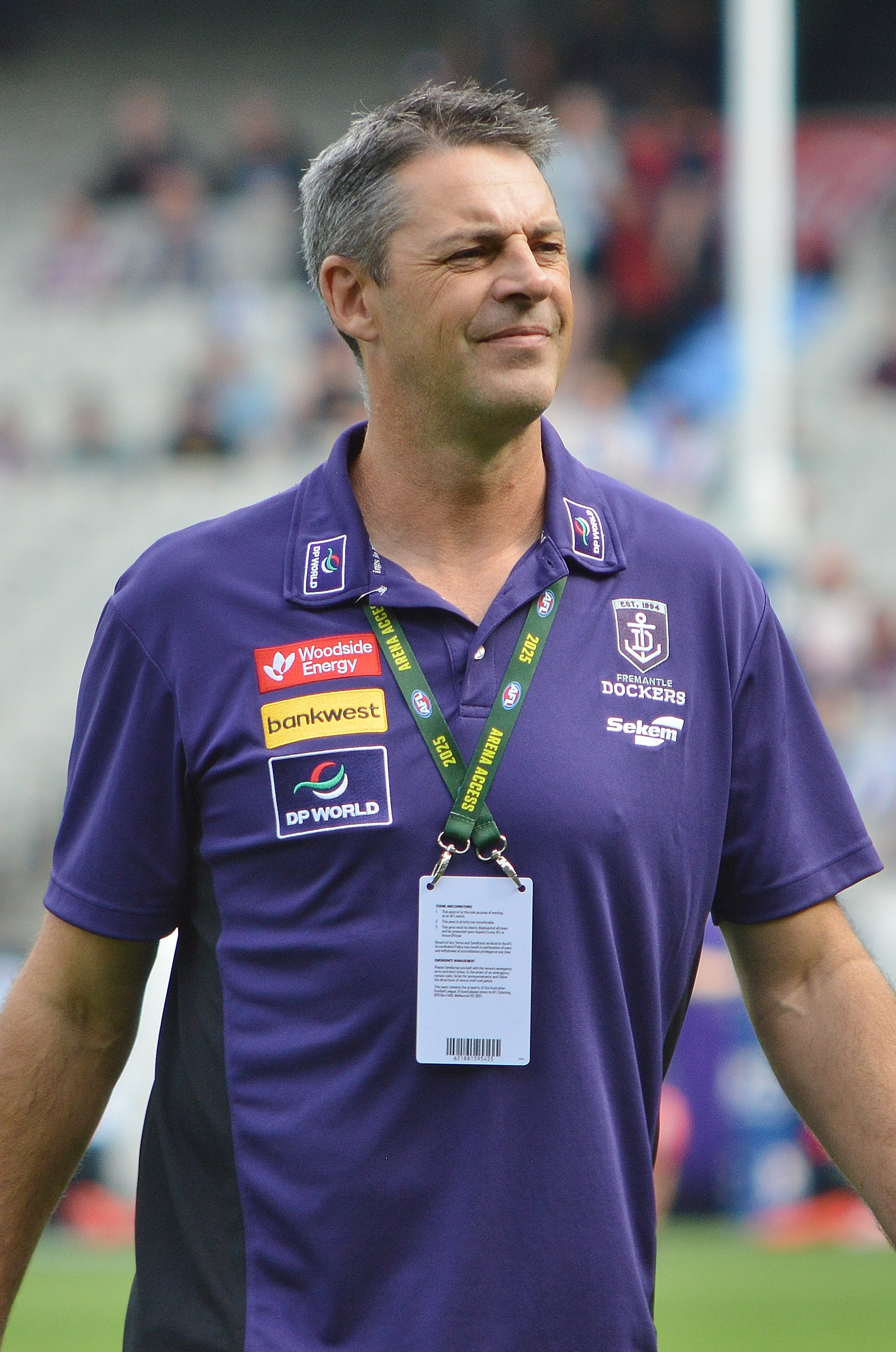
Rawlings serving as an assistant coach of Fremantle in 2025

=== Norwood Football Club ===
On 5 November 2020, Rawlings became the senior coach at the Norwood Football Club in the SANFL.

In 2022, Rawlings coached Norwood to their 31st SANFL premiership, winning a 1-point thriller against minor premiers North Adelaide.

In 2024, Rawlings coached Norwood to a minor premiership, dominating most of the season by being on top of the ladder for the majority of the rounds. During the 2024 finals series Rawlings coached Norwood into another Grand Final but unfortunately, in spite of leading for most of the game, Glenelg pegged them down and won. Rawling's Redlegs finishing runners up.

=== Fremantle Football Club ===
In October 2024, Rawlings was appointed as an assistant coach in the role of backline coach of the Fremantle Football Club under senior coach Justin Longmuir.

== Personal life ==
Rawlings was married to Samantha Richardson (sister of former Richmond player Matthew Richardson). They have two children. He also has two children with new wife Sallee.

Rawlings also has a brother, Brady, who played for the North Melbourne Football Club. In the latter stages of Rawlings' career he was drafted by the Kangaroos and played alongside his brother.

Rawlings plays cricket in Melbourne for the Burnley CYMS Cricket Club, alongside his brother-in-law, Andrew, whenever his football commitments allow.
