= Wally Carter =

Australian rules footballer and coach

Personal information
- Full name: Wallace Francis Carter
- Born: 4 February 1909; Carlton, Victoria
- Died: 6 June 2001 (aged 92); Essendon, Victoria
- Original team: Balmain
- Height: 175 cm (5 ft 9 in)
- Weight: 72 kg (159 lb)

Playing career^{1}
Years	Club	Games (Goals)
1929–1940	North Melbourne	137 (32)

Coaching career
Years	Club	Games (W–L–D)
1940, 1948–1953	North Melbourne	127 (63-64-0)
1954–1957	Williamstown	91 (76-15-0)
1958–1962	North Melbourne	92 (35-56-1)
1963–1964	Brunswick	36 (11-24-1)
- ^{1} Playing statistics correct to the end of 1963.

Wallace Francis Carter (4 February 1909 – 6 June 2001) was an Australian rules footballer who played for and coached North Melbourne in the Victorian Football League (VFL).

Carter made his debut for North Melbourne in 1929 and played with the club for over a decade, winning the inaugural Syd Barker Medal for their best and fairest player in 1937. Towards the end of the 1940 season he acted as caretaker coach but with little success. It was his last season as a player but he would return to the club in 1948 as coach. He acted as coach from 1948 to 1953, and became the first North Melbourne coach to lead the club to a VFL Grand Final.

In 1954, Carter signed to coach Victorian Football Association club Williamstown. He demanded his players train to the same standard as his former VFL club, and led the club into its most successful era. Under Carter's four-year tenure, Williamstown won consecutive premierships in 1954, 1955 and 1956, and was the unbeaten minor premier in 1957 before being eliminated from the finals in straight sets. He was coach of the VFA representative team in 1957.

Carter returned to coach North Melbourne again from 1958 to 1962. During this time he became the first ever person to coach over 200 games for North Melbourne. He then coached Brunswick, in 1963 and 1964.

He was inducted into the North Melbourne Hall of Fame in 2002. He was named as coach of the Williamstown Team of the Century in 2003, and was an inaugural inductee in the Williamstown Hall of Fame in 2014.
