= Dally O'Brien =

Australian rules footballer, born 1918

Personal information
- Full name: Henry Dalziel O'Brien
- Born: 31 October 1918; Seymour, Victoria
- Died: 15 August 1996 (aged 77)
- Original team: Kensington
- Height: 182 cm (6 ft 0 in)
- Weight: 76 kg (168 lb)

Playing career^{1}
Years	Club	Games (Goals)
1938–1949	North Melbourne	137 (63)
- ^{1} Playing statistics correct to the end of 1949.

Henry Dalziel 'Dally' O'Brien (31 October 1918 – 15 August 1996) was an Australian rules footballer who played with North Melbourne in the VFL during the 1940s. O'Brien played 137 games for North Melbourne and was club captain in 1944 and 1945. He won their best and fairest award in 1948, also finishing equal 8th in the Brownlow Medal count.
