= Brady Rawlings =

Australian rules footballer

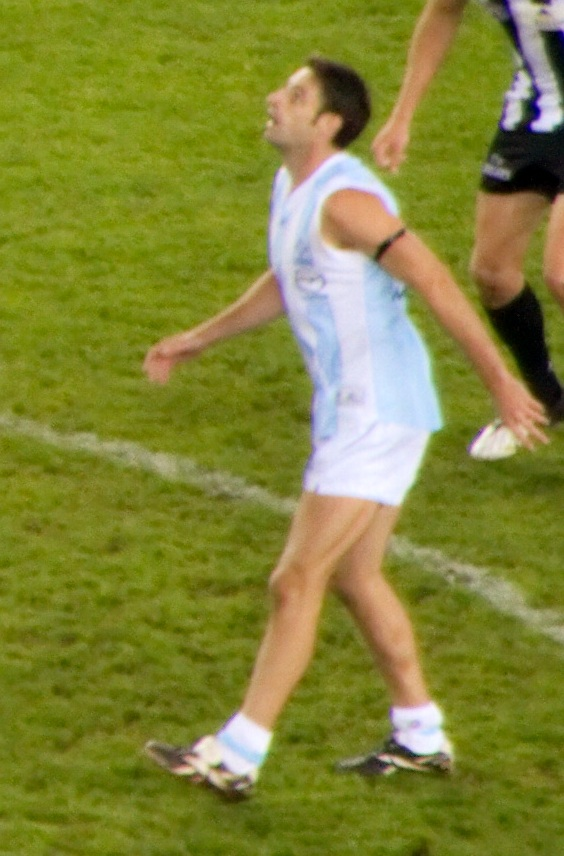

Personal information
- Full name: Brady Rawlings
- Born: 10 June 1981 (age 45); Devonport, Tasmania
- Original team: Tassie Mariners (TAC Cup)
- Draft: No. 15, 1998 National draft, Kangaroos
- Height: 184 cm (6 ft 0 in)
- Weight: 82 kg (181 lb)

Playing career^{1}
Years	Club	Games (Goals)
1999–2011	North Melbourne	245 (62)

International team honours
Years	Team	Games (Goals)
2004	Australia	2
- ^{1} Playing statistics correct to the end of 2011.

Career highlights
- Syd Barker Medal 2004, 2006, 2010

Brady Rawlings (born 10 June 1981) is a former Australian rules footballer who played 245 games for the North Melbourne Kangaroos. Ahead of the 2014 season, he was appointed as the midfield coach of the West Coast Eagles. After three years in the position, Rawlings shifted from coaching to the role of list manager. He grew up in Devonport, Tasmania and attended St Brendan-Shaw College.

He is the younger brother of former AFL footballer, and Richmond 2009 caretaker coach, Jade. Rawlings was recruited to the Kangaroos in the 1998 AFL draft, with the 15th selection. Rawlings completed year 12 (final year of school) at University High School whilst in his first year at the club (1999).

Rawlings made a name for himself becoming one of the league's best taggers, but as his game grew in 2003 he started to win much more of his own ball, to hurt the opposition defensively and offensively. In 2004, he had his best season to date, gaining selection for the International rules football series and taking out the Syd Barker Medal for the North Melbourne best and fairest. In 2005, Rawlings had another solid year, albeit not as good as the previous, but 2006 saw him recapture the career-best form to take out his second Syd Barker Medal.

Rawlings was a solid contributor in 2007 and 2008, but after some retirements, he was forced to be played in a variety of different roles. In 2009, a rebuilding year for the club, he spent much time playing in defence shutting down some of the game's most elusive players in Cyril Rioli and Aaron Davey. Rawlings played his 200th AFL game in North Melbourne's five point win over St Kilda in round 21. He continued in this defensive role in 2010, but was also able to get the ball himself, having a career high 623 possessions and sharing his third Syd Barker Medal with Brent Harvey.

Rawlings retired from football at the end of the 2011 season when North Melbourne finished 9th on the ladder.

After retiring, he joined North Melbourne as the senior recruiting and induction coach- which he held during the 2012/13 seasons. At the end of the 2013 season, Rawlings left North Melbourne to accept a role at the West Coast Eagles as an assistant coach under new senior coach and former teammate and captain of Rawlings Adam Simpson. Following the 2016 season, Rawlings was appointed to the role of list manager.
