= Ben Cunnington (footballer) =

Australian rules footballer

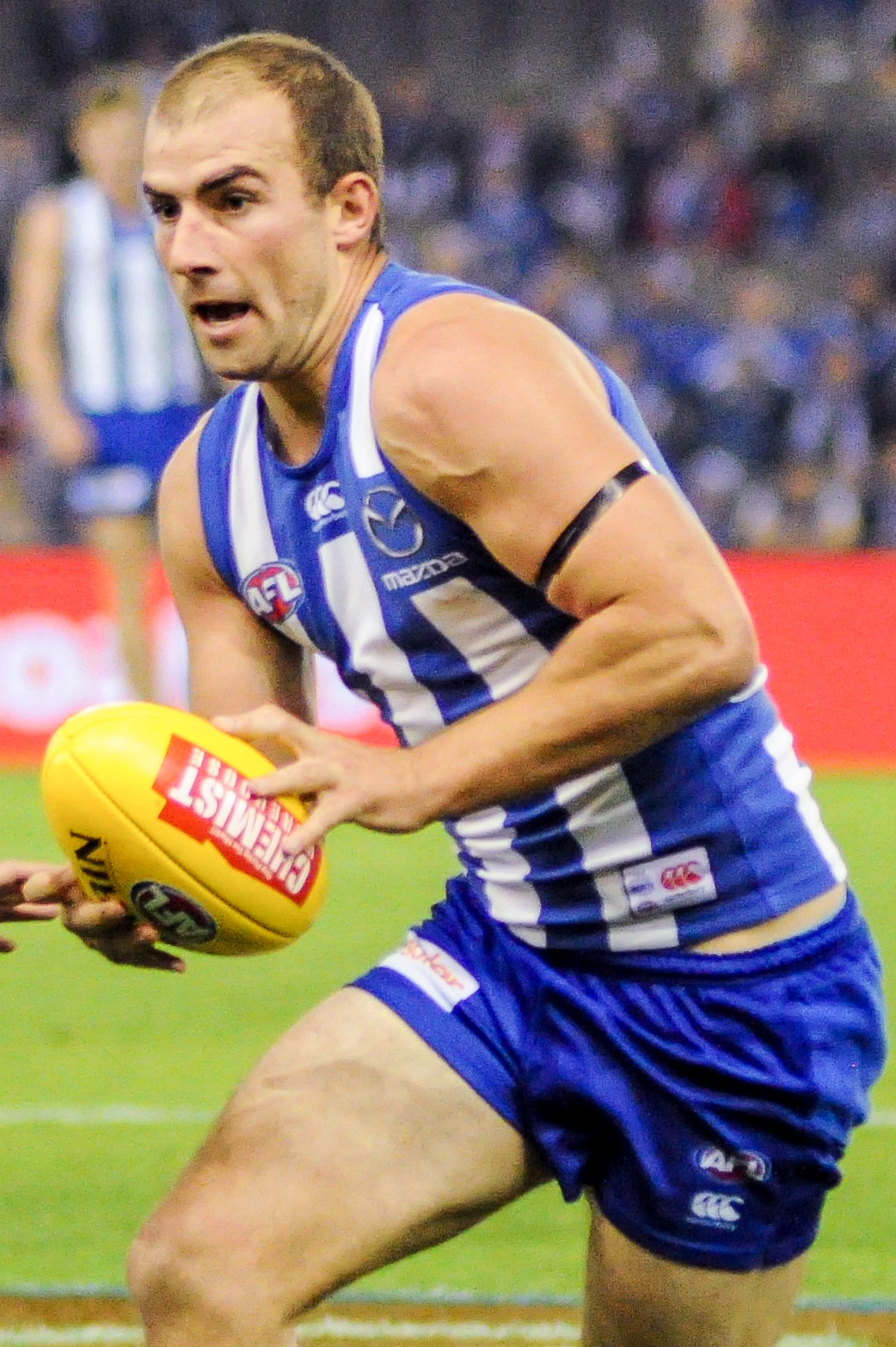
- Cunnington playing for North Melbourne in June 2017

Personal information
- Born: 30 June 1991 (age 35)
- Original team: Cobden (Vic)/Geelong Falcons
- Draft: 5th overall, 2009; North Melbourne
- Height: 185 cm (6 ft 1 in)
- Weight: 88 kg (194 lb)
- Position: Midfielder

Club information
- Current club: North Melbourne
- Number: 10

Playing career^{1}
Years	Club	Games (Goals)
2010–2023	North Melbourne	238 (98)
- ^{1} Playing statistics correct to the end of 2023.

Career highlights
- 2x Syd Barker Medal: 2014, 2019

Ben Cunnington (born 30 June 1991) is a former Australian rules footballer who played for the North Melbourne Football Club in the Australian Football League (AFL). Cunnington was drafted to North Melbourne with the 5th selection in the 2009 AFL draft.

Cunnington played predominantly as an inside midfielder, who sometimes played in the forward line to accommodate the midfield rotations.

== Junior career ==
Cunnington made his senior debut for Cobden at the age of 15. In his first game against Camperdown he kicked ten goals after coming on the ground just before half time. Cunnington's other junior football highlights included earning NAB AFL U18 Championships All-Australian honours and finishing runner up in the TAC Cup Morrish Medal where he averaged 23 disposals (11 contested) and six marks. Cunnington missed the 2009 AFL Draft Camp through minor injuries.

Geelong Falcons regional manager Michael Turner described Cunnington as the most professional player I have seen in 15 years of TAC Cup.

== AFL career ==
Cunnington was drafted by North Melbourne with the 5th overall selection of the 2009 AFL draft from the Geelong Falcons.

He made his debut in Tasmania against Hawthorn in Round 5 of the 2010 season where he gathered 12 disposals helping North Melbourne to a 12-point win and their second victory of the season.

Often considered one of the toughest players in the AFL, Cunnington won North’s best and fairest award, the Syd Barker Medal in 2014 and 2019 and was runner up in 2015, 2017, 2018 and 2021. He was also an All-Australian nominee in 2019. As of the end of 2022, Cunnington has tallied a career total of 71 Brownlow Medal votes.

In August 2022, Cunnington signed a two-year contract extension at North, taking him to the end of the 2024 season. However, on 8 August 2023, Cunnington announced that he would retire in four days, following North Melbourne's Round 22 fixture against Essendon, after 14 seasons and 238 games at North Melbourne.

Cunnington was one of the best players on the ground in his final game, with 24 disposals, ten clearances and two goals.

== Personal life ==
Cunnington grew up on a dairy farm in regional Victoria and is a keen farmer and fisherman.

He founded the Shinboner Cattle Company in 2016.

Cunnington twice recovered from cancer to earn his place again in North Melbourne’s top side.

He is married with three children.
