= Daniel Wells (footballer) =

Australian rules footballer (born 1985)

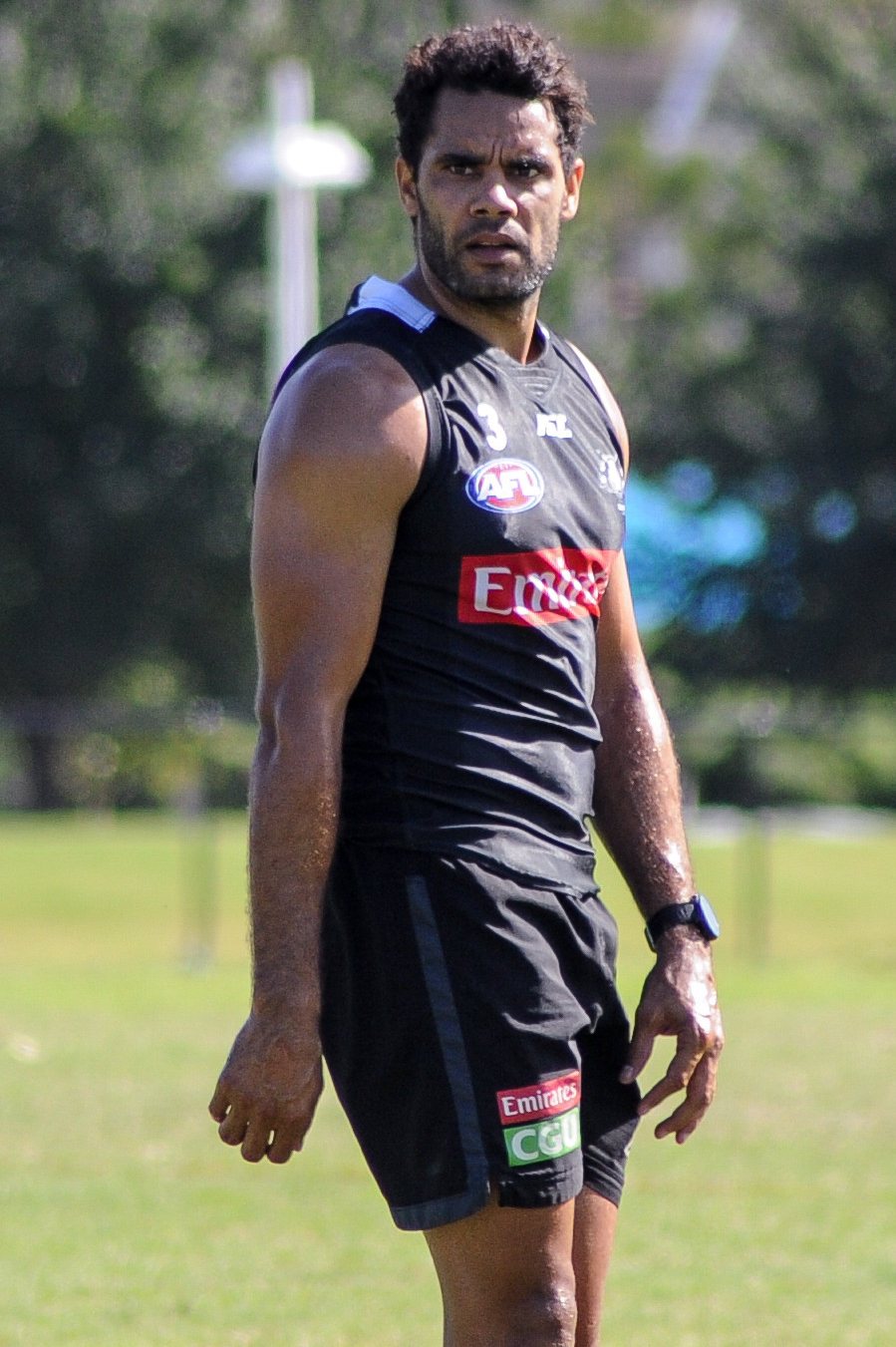
- Wells with Collingwood in March 2017

Personal information
- Full name: Daniel Wells
- Born: 3 February 1985 (age 41); Port Lincoln, South Australia.
- Original team: Peel (WAFL)
- Draft: No. 2, 2002 national draft
- Height: 181 cm (5 ft 11 in)
- Weight: 79 kg (174 lb)
- Position: Midfielder

Playing career
Years	Club	Games (Goals)
2003–2016	North Melbourne	243 (150)
2017–2019	Collingwood	15 (16)
Total		258 (166)

Career highlights
- 2× Syd Barker Medal: 2011, 2013; AFLPA best first year player: 2003; AFL Rising Star nominee: 2003; AFL Goal of the Year: 2004; Archer–Hird Medal: 2013

Daniel Wells (born 3 February 1985) is a former professional Australian rules footballer who played for North Melbourne and Collingwood in the Australian Football League (AFL).

== Early life ==
Wells was born and raised in Port Lincoln, South Australia. He played junior football there from the age of nine for local clubs including Mallee Park. A big break in his junior career came when he was selected for an Under 16 international rules football tour to Ireland, where he was chosen as captain. His adeptness to the hybrid game would see him eventually captain Australia at senior level.

Wells moved to Perth, Western Australia as a teenager and starred in the WAFL for the Peel Thunder where he caught the eyes of AFL scouts.

== AFL career ==
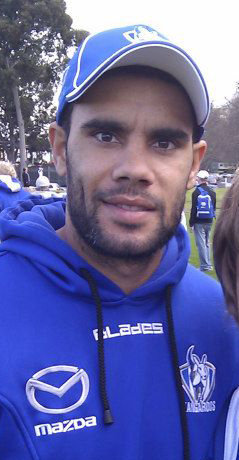
Wells with North Melbourne in 2012

Wells was selected by North Melbourne with the number two overall pick in the 2002 AFL draft and made his debut in 2003 playing 18 games and averaging 12 disposals per game. He rose to prominence in 2004 when, against Fremantle, he kicked the AFL Goal of the Year, jumping and taking the ball from ruck contest in the goal square and kicking the goal before he landed.

Wells was selected in the Australian team for the 2005 International Rules Series but was unable to play due to injury. He enjoyed a fairly good year in 2006 in which he averaged 18 disposals and finished 2nd in the Syd Barker Medal.

In 2008, Wells enjoyed a good season averaging 21 disposals and having a big impact in matches in the second half of the season during North Melbourne's winning period. He was rewarded with selection in the Australian side that lost to Ireland in that year's International Rules Series.

The next year was disappointing for Wells, as injuries restricted him to just seven games played in 2009.

In 2011 Wells won his first Syd Barker Medal which he shared with Andrew Swallow. He would also be named in the 40 man All Australian squad but would miss out on being part of the final 22.

Following the 2013 season, the two-time best and fairest was chosen to represent Australia in the International Rules Series as captain of the exclusively Indigenous team.

At the conclusion of the 2016 season, Wells announced his intentions to leave North Melbourne as a free agent and he signed with Collingwood as an unrestricted free agent in October.

On 24 May 2017, it was announced that he would wear number 67 on his guernsey, rather than his usual 3, for the round 10 Sir Doug Nicholls Indigenous Round game against Brisbane Lions. This was to commemorate the 1967 referendum (which allowed Indigenous Australians to be counted with the general population in the census).

Wells retired in September 2019.

== Statistics ==
Statistics are correct to the end of the 2019 season

Legend
G	Goals	K	Kicks	D	Disposals	T	Tackles
B	Behinds	H	Handballs	M	Marks

Season	Team	No.	Games	Totals							Averages (per game)						
Season	Team	No.	Games	G	B	K	H	D	M	T	G	B	K	H	D	M	T
2003	Kangaroos	8	18	10	7	149	67	216	64	39	0.6	0.4	8.3	3.7	12.0	3.6	2.2
2004	Kangaroos	8	22	13	8	239	114	353	89	49	0.6	0.4	10.9	5.2	16.0	4.0	2.2
2005	Kangaroos	8	22	12	10	246	148	394	86	43	0.5	0.5	11.2	6.7	17.9	3.9	2.0
2006	Kangaroos	8	22	11	7	227	180	407	81	53	0.5	0.3	10.3	8.2	18.5	3.7	2.4
2007	Kangaroos	8	18	14	18	193	139	332	70	44	0.8	1.0	10.7	7.7	18.4	3.9	2.4
2008	North Melbourne	8	21	6	11	271	173	444	92	59	0.3	0.5	12.9	8.2	21.1	4.4	2.8
2009	North Melbourne	8	7	4	1	94	41	135	30	13	0.6	0.1	13.4	5.9	19.3	4.3	1.9
2010	North Melbourne	8	19	15	11	246	150	396	90	43	0.8	0.6	12.9	7.9	20.8	4.7	2.3
2011	North Melbourne	8	21	17	15	312	180	492	80	80	0.8	0.7	14.9	8.6	23.4	3.8	3.8
2012	North Melbourne	8	20	14	16	290	149	439	72	59	0.7	0.8	14.5	7.5	22.0	3.6	3.0
2013	North Melbourne	8	22	25	10	291	177	468	80	52	1.1	0.5	13.2	8.0	21.3	3.6	2.4
2014	North Melbourne	8	10	4	4	100	87	187	39	25	0.4	0.4	10.0	8.7	18.7	3.9	2.5
2015	North Melbourne	8	2	0	0	6	16	22	1	6	0.0	0.0	3.0	8.0	11.0	0.5	3.0
2016	North Melbourne	8	19	5	5	224	215	439	67	82	0.3	0.3	11.8	11.3	23.1	3.5	4.3
2017	Collingwood	3/67	10	11	5	101	84	185	47	22	1.1	0.5	10.1	8.4	18.5	4.7	2.2
2018	Collingwood	3	4	2	4	32	18	50	14	10	0.5	1.0	8.0	4.5	12.5	3.5	2.5
2019	Collingwood	3	1	3	0	6	5	11	4	2	3.0	0.0	6.0	5.0	11.0	4.0	2.0
Career			258	166	132	3027	1943	4970	1006	681	0.6	0.5	11.7	7.5	19.3	3.9	2.6

== Health scare ==
At the end of the 2011 season Wells had shoulder surgery during which it was discovered that he had a large blood clot on his lungs. The clot was successfully removed and Wells returned to full health and resumed playing.

== Media profile and personal life ==
He is a devout Roman Catholic.

On 14 October 2006 Wells married school teacher Mariangela Laudato. They have a daughter, Laudate Angelus.
