= Noel Teasdale =

Australian rules footballer

Personal information
- Full name: Noel Teasdale
- Born: 2 January 1938 (age 88)
- Original team: Daylesford
- Height: 188 cm (6 ft 2 in)
- Weight: 98 kg (216 lb)
- Position: Ruck

Playing career^{1}
Years	Club	Games (Goals)
1956–1967	North Melbourne (VFL)	178 (71)
1968–1970	Woodville (SANFL)	47 (23)
Total		225 (94)
- ^{1} Playing statistics correct to the end of 1970.

Noel Teasdale (born 2 January 1938) is a former Australian rules footballer who played in the Victorian Football League (VFL) and the South Australian National Football League (SANFL).

Originally from Daylesford, Teasdale made his debut with the North Melbourne Football Club in 1956 playing as a ruckman and, for a period, a full-back.

Teasdale was noted for his tough, uncompromising play; and, in 1964, this almost cost him his life as his head clashed with that of North teammate Ken Dean, leaving him in critical condition with a fractured skull in St. Vincent's Hospital. Midway through that same year, just five weeks after the near-fatal injury, Teasdale came back to play for North, wearing a protective head guard due to medical advice. He also was the acting captain in the absence of injured skipper Allen Aylett.

The 1965 season saw Teasdale produce his best season yet – tying for the Brownlow Medal with Ian Stewart. Although he originally lost on countback, he was later awarded a retrospective medal in 1989.

His VFL career ended in 1967, and he later moved to Woodville Football Club, where he was captain-coach from 1968 to 1970 and then non-playing coach in 1971. Later on, he coached West Torrens Football Club in 1975–76.
