= List of VFL debuts in 1982 =

The 1982 Victorian Football League (VFL) season was the 86th season of the VFL. The season saw 91 Australian rules footballers make their senior VFL debut and a further 26 players transfer to new clubs having previously played in the VFL.

== Summary ==
Summary of debuts in 1982
| Club | VFL debuts | Change of club |
|---|---|---|
| Carlton | 4 | 2 |
| Collingwood | 10 | 3 |
| Essendon | 6 | 2 |
| Fitzroy | 7 | 2 |
| Footscray | 13 | 1 |
| Geelong | 9 | 1 |
| Hawthorn | 4 | 2 |
| Melbourne | 11 | 3 |
| North Melbourne | 7 | 1 |
| Richmond | 4 | 5 |
| St Kilda | 13 | 1 |
| Sydney | 3 | 3 |
| Total | 91 | 26 |

== Debuts ==
| Name | Club | Age at debut | Round debuted | Games | Goals | Notes |
|---|---|---|---|---|---|---|
| Paul Meldrum | Carlton | 21 years, 293 days | 15 | 158 | 140 | |
| Allan Montgomery | Carlton | 23 years, 206 days | 1 | 33 | 6 | |
| Ross Ditchburn | Carlton | 25 years, 58 days | 8 | 28 | 91 | |
| Mark Buckley | Carlton | 19 years, 340 days | 18 | 27 | 35 | Son of Brian Buckley and brother of Stephen Buckley. |
| David Clarke | Carlton | 29 years, 114 days | 5 | 9 | 21 | Father of David, Tim and Georgina Clarke. Previously played for Geelong. |
| Stephen Easton | Carlton | 22 years, 290 days | 10 | 1 | 0 | Son of Kevin Easton. Previously played for North Melbourne. |
| Geoff Miles | Collingwood | 20 years, 90 days | 3 | 31 | 7 | Father of Teia Miles and father-in-law of Mitch Duncan. |
| Chris Dalkin | Collingwood | 20 years, 45 days | 4 | 18 | 12 | |
| Wally Lovett | Collingwood | 20 years, 109 days | 2 | 15 | 11 | |
| Graham Teasdale | Collingwood | 26 years, 274 days | 1 | 14 | 21 | 1977 Brownlow Medallist. Previously played for Richmond and South Melbourne. |
| Tom Floyd | Collingwood | 21 years, 255 days | 13 | 14 | 8 | Previously played for Geelong. |
| Neil Peart | Collingwood | 23 years, 173 days | 1 | 13 | 0 | |
| Mark Lawson | Collingwood | 20 years, 54 days | 17 | 11 | 0 | |
| Tony Russell | Collingwood | 21 years, 192 days | 17 | 8 | 17 | |
| Paul Ryan | Collingwood | 20 years, 22 days | 12 | 6 | 1 | |
| Tony Beers | Collingwood | 19 years, 182 days | 7 | 5 | 1 | Son of Brian Beers and brother of Mark Beers. |
| Tony Keenan | Collingwood | 18 years, 79 days | 17 | 3 | 0 | |
| Gordon Towan | Collingwood | 28 years, 59 days | 9 | 2 | 0 | |
| Peter Carter | Collingwood | 23 years, 23 days | 9 | 1 | 1 | Previously played for South Melbourne. |
| Billy Duckworth | Essendon | 23 years, 34 days | 1 | 126 | 64 | Brother of John Duckworth. |
| Stephen Copping | Essendon | 25 years, 236 days | 1 | 42 | 88 | |
| Wayne Otway | Essendon | 25 years, 276 days | 1 | 36 | 65 | |
| Chris Waterson | Essendon | 21 years, 99 days | 15 | 31 | 11 | |
| Tony West | Essendon | 25 years, 218 days | 4 | 8 | 8 | |
| Roy Ramsay | Essendon | 26 years, 146 days | 10 | 3 | 0 | Previously played for North Melbourne. |
| Brian Brown | Essendon | 24 years, 300 days | 17 | 2 | 0 | Father of Jonathan Brown. Previously played for Fitzroy. |
| Anton Grbac | Essendon | 21 years, 210 days | 20 | 2 | 0 | |
| Paul Roos | Fitzroy | 18 years, 295 days | 4 | 269 | 270 | |
| Richard Osborne | Fitzroy | 18 years, 17 days | 15 | 187 | 411 | Brother of Graham Osborne. |
| Gary Pert | Fitzroy | 16 years, 325 days | 4 | 163 | 42 | Son of Brian Pert. |
| Bradley Gotch | Fitzroy | 19 years, 277 days | 1 | 43 | 60 | Father of Seb Gotch. |
| Garry Sidebottom | Fitzroy | 27 years, 238 days | 16 | 43 | 53 | Brother of Allan Sidebottom. Previously played for St Kilda and Geelong. |
| Michael Coates | Fitzroy | 21 years, 80 days | 1 | 29 | 5 | Son of George Coates. |
| Jan Smith | Fitzroy | 25 years, 354 days | 8 | 7 | 1 | Previously played for Geelong. |
| Mark Eaves | Fitzroy | 20 years, 351 days | 8 | 2 | 0 | |
| Andrew Merryweather | Fitzroy | 21 years, 117 days | 1 | 1 | 0 | Also known as Andrew Guthrie. Father of Cameron and Zach Guthrie. |
| Stephen MacPherson | Footscray | 17 years, 115 days | 1 | 188 | 152 | Brother of Rod MacPherson and father of Darcy MacPherson. |
| Simon Beasley | Footscray | 25 years, 234 days | 1 | 154 | 575 | |
| Rod MacPherson | Footscray | 18 years, 285 days | 15 | 43 | 24 | Brother of Stephen MacPherson and uncle of Darcy MacPherson. |
| Terry Love | Footscray | 18 years, 143 days | 1 | 13 | 11 | |
| Gary Walpole | Footscray | 18 years, 170 days | 4 | 12 | 5 | |
| Ian Rickman | Footscray | 19 years, 108 days | 16 | 11 | 10 | |
| Ross Christensen | Footscray | 20 years, 128 days | 12 | 10 | 16 | |
| Allan Jennings | Footscray | 23 years, 4 days | 1 | 9 | 15 | |
| Steven Hargrave | Footscray | 27 years, 295 days | 4 | 2 | 0 | Father of Ryan Hargrave. |
| Lindsay Sneddon | Footscray | 20 years, 141 days | 13 | 2 | 1 | |
| Jamie Barham | Footscray | 21 years, 214 days | 15 | 1 | 0 | Brother of Ricky Barham and uncle of Jaxson Barham. Previously played for Melbourne. |
| Darren Brown | Footscray | 17 years, 56 days | 15 | 1 | 0 | |
| Darren Grant | Footscray | 19 years, 97 days | 18 | 1 | 0 | |
| Bruce West | Footscray | 19 years, 265 days | 19 | 1 | 0 | |
| Andrew Bews | Geelong | 17 years, 222 days | 4 | 207 | 132 | Father of Jed Bews. |
| Tim Darcy | Geelong | 18 years, 204 days | 9 | 176 | 83 | |
| Damian Drum | Geelong | 21 years, 284 days | 7 | 63 | 34 | Uncle of Marcus Drum. |
| David O'Keeffe | Geelong | 20 years, 70 days | 6 | 58 | 22 | |
| Craig Cleave | Geelong | 19 years, 73 days | 17 | 48 | 12 | |
| Rod Waddell | Geelong | 25 years, 13 days | 11 | 20 | 10 | Uncle of Daniel, Shannon and Steven Motlop. Previously played for Carlton. |
| Peter Zychla | Geelong | 18 years, 279 days | 5 | 12 | 1 | |
| Stephen Nichols | Geelong | 18 years, 331 days | 8 | 7 | 6 | |
| Phillip Maddock | Geelong | 20 years, 185 days | 3 | 3 | 1 | |
| Karl Fedke | Geelong | 20 years, 24 days | 21 | 2 | 0 | |
| Dermott Brereton | Hawthorn | 18 years, 23 days | SF | 189 | 427 | |
| Gary Buckenara | Hawthorn | 23 years, 267 days | 1 | 154 | 293 | |
| Richard Loveridge | Hawthorn | 19 years, 71 days | 1 | 136 | 119 | |
| Michael Byrne | Hawthorn | 23 years, 131 days | 3 | 90 | 97 | Previously played for Melbourne. |
| Gary Ablett | Hawthorn | 20 years, 184 days | 2 | 6 | 10 | Brother of Geoff and Kevin Ablett, brother-in-law of Michael Tuck, father of Gary Jr. and Nathan Ablett, and uncle of Luke Ablett and Shane and Travis Tuck. |
| Robert Dutton | Hawthorn | 19 years, 71 days | 14 | 1 | 1 | Previously played for Carlton. |
| Brian Wilson | Melbourne | 20 years, 179 days | 1 | 154 | 208 | 1982 Brownlow Medallist. Previously played for Footscray and North Melbourne. |
| Alan Johnson | Melbourne | 25 years, 128 days | 1 | 135 | 95 | First player to be drafted in VFL/AFL Draft history. Father of Chris Johnson. |
| Adrian Battiston | Melbourne | 18 years, 193 days | 1 | 96 | 75 | |
| Alan Jarrott | Melbourne | 25 years, 223 days | 1 | 91 | 26 | Previously played for North Melbourne. |
| Chris Connolly | Melbourne | 19 years, 86 days | 13 | 84 | 38 | |
| Steven Icke | Melbourne | 26 years, 21 days | 1 | 78 | 17 | Previously played for North Melbourne. |
| Dale Dickson | Melbourne | 19 years, 288 days | 4 | 56 | 20 | |
| David Cordner | Melbourne | 19 years, 307 days | 1 | 53 | 61 | Grandson of Edward Cordner, son of Ted Cordner and nephew of Denis, Don and John Cordner. |
| Michael O'Sullivan | Melbourne | 19 years, 357 days | 1 | 53 | 11 | |
| Ted Fidge | Melbourne | 19 years, 12 days | 1 | 42 | 61 | Brother of John Fidge. |
| Peter Tossol | Melbourne | 19 years, 161 days | 6 | 17 | 20 | Brother of John Tossol. |
| Stephen McCarthy | Melbourne | 19 years, 355 days | 6 | 12 | 9 | |
| Stuart McKenzie | Melbourne | 21 years, 84 days | 6 | 9 | 0 | |
| Scott Sutcliffe | Melbourne | 19 years, 178 days | 19 | 7 | 2 | |
| Donald McDonald | North Melbourne | 19 years, 363 days | 19 | 155 | 165 | Father of Luke McDonald |
| Phil Krakouer | North Melbourne | 22 years, 71 days | 1 | 141 | 224 | Brother of Andrew and Jim Krakouer and uncle of Andrew and Nathan Krakouer. |
| Jim Krakouer | North Melbourne | 23 years, 165 days | 1 | 134 | 229 | Brother of Andrew and Phil Krakouer, father of Andrew Krakouer and uncle of Nathan Krakouer. |
| Graeme Atkins | North Melbourne | 18 years, 162 days | 3 | 61 | 39 | |
| Bruce Abernethy | North Melbourne | 19 years, 321 days | 1 | 43 | 21 | |
| Craig Holden | North Melbourne | 24 years, 225 days | 1 | 29 | 2 | |
| Phil Carman | North Melbourne | 31 years, 232 days | 5 | 13 | 27 | Previously played for Collingwood, Essendon and Melbourne. |
| Brad Nimmo | North Melbourne | 23 years, 171 days | 17 | 13 | 0 | |
| Phil Egan | Richmond | 19 years, 39 days | 2 | 125 | 117 | |
| Maurice Rioli | Richmond | 24 years, 200 days | 2 | 118 | 80 | |
| Andy Preston | Richmond | 24 years, 300 days | 12 | 18 | 6 | Previously played for Geelong. |
| Ian Sartori | Richmond | 23 years, 212 days | 16 | 18 | 7 | Previously played for St Kilda. |
| Wayne Shand | Richmond | 21 years, 104 days | 6 | 12 | 1 | |
| Stephen Pirrie | Richmond | 21 years, 88 days | 13 | 11 | 0 | Grandson of Richard Pirrie, son of Kevin Pirrie and nephew of Dick Pirrie. |
| Darryl Sutton | Richmond | 29 years, 259 days | 3 | 6 | 0 | Previously played for North Melbourne. |
| Ross Brewer | Richmond | 28 years, 274 days | 8 | 6 | 8 | Brother of Ian Brewer. Previously played for Melbourne and Collingwood. |
| Noel Mugavin | Richmond | 25 years, 265 days | 2 | 2 | 3 | Uncle of Jonathan Brown. Previously played for Fitzroy. |
| Peter Kiel | St Kilda | 23 years, 176 days | 1 | 80 | 29 | |
| Robert Mace | St Kilda | 23 years, 269 days | 7 | 72 | 32 | Previously played for Hawthorn. |
| Darryl Cowie | St Kilda | 21 years, 26 days | 3 | 56 | 8 | |
| Glen Brown | St Kilda | 20 years, 160 days | 12 | 31 | 25 | |
| John Favier | St Kilda | 21 years, 254 days | 2 | 26 | 1 | |
| Simon O'Donnell | St Kilda | 19 years, 60 days | 1 | 24 | 18 | Represented Australia in cricket. |
| Greg Packham | St Kilda | 23 years, 26 days | 1 | 17 | 31 | |
| Paul Armstrong | St Kilda | 25 years, 83 days | 2 | 12 | 1 | |
| Wayne Slattery | St Kilda | 21 years, 156 days | 2 | 11 | 12 | Father of Tyson Slattery. |
| Steven Allan | St Kilda | 25 years, 221 days | 6 | 9 | 2 | |
| Allan Hassell | St Kilda | 24 years, 32 days | 6 | 6 | 0 | |
| Neil Park | St Kilda | 20 years, 22 days | 20 | 3 | 5 | |
| Geoff Linke | St Kilda | 26 years, 133 days | 2 | 2 | 3 | |
| Malcolm Smith | St Kilda | 23 years, 95 days | 22 | 1 | 0 | Father of Nick Smith. |
| Craig Braddy | Sydney Swans | 28 years, 24 days | 7 | 56 | 83 | Brother of Shane Braddy. Previously played for Fitzroy. |
| Steven Taubert | Sydney Swans | 28 years, 242 days | 11 | 44 | 26 | Previously played for Richmond and Essendon. |
| Jack Lucas | Sydney Swans | 21 years, 73 days | 13 | 19 | 6 | |
| John Reid | Sydney Swans | 29 years, 142 days | 16 | 10 | 2 | Previously played for Melbourne and Footscray. |
| Gerard Neesham | Sydney Swans | 27 years, 148 days | 7 | 9 | 1 | |
| Trevor Mustey | Sydney Swans | 18 years, 249 days | 11 | 2 | 0 | |
