= Beers (surname) =

Beers is a surname. Notable people with the surname include:

- Adrian Beers (1916–2004), British double bass player
- Alanson Beers (1808–1853), American pioneer and politician
- Alma Holland Beers (1892–1974), American botanist
- Austin Beers (born 2003), American stock car racer
- Betsy Beers (born 1957), American television and film producer
- Bob Beers (disambiguation), various people
- Brian Beers (born 1939), Australian rules footballer
- Charlotte Beers, American businesswoman
- Clarence Beers (1918–2002), American baseball player
- Clifford Whittingham Beers (1876–1943), founder of the mental hygiene movement
- Cyrus Beers (1786–1850), U.S. Congressman from New York
- David Beers (born 1957), Canadian journalist
- David T. Beers, U.S. financial analyst
- Edward Beers (disambiguation), various people
- Ethel Lynn Beers (1827–1879), American poet
- Eric Beers (born 1969), American stock car racer
- Francine Beers (1924–2014), American actress
- Garry Gary Beers (born 1957), Australian musician and former member of INXS
- George D. Beers (1812–1880), New York politician
- Georgia Beers, American lesbian writer
- Heather Beers, American actress and freelance writer
- Hector Beers (1876–1954), English cricketer
- Henry Augustin Beers (1847–1926) American author, literary historian, poet, and professor
- Jim Beers (born 2000), Dutch footballer
- Jinx Beers (1933–2018), American activist and editor
- John Beers (born 1952), Canadian athlete
- Julie Hart Beers (1835–1913), American painter
- Kathryn Beers, American polymer chemist
- Katie Beers (born 1982), American kidnapping victim
- Kenneth N. Beers (died 2017), American medical doctor
- Laura Beers, American author and historian
- Lauren Beers (born 1994), American artistic gymnast
- Lorna Beers (1897–1989), American author
- Mark Beers (disambiguation), various people
- Matthew Beers (born 1994), South African cyclist
- Rand Beers (born 1942), American counterterrorism expert
- Raegan Beers (born 2004), American women's basketball player
- Seth Preston Beers (1781–1863), American lawyer and politician
- Terry Beers (1925–2015), Australian rugby league footballer
- Thom Beers (born 1952), American television producer and voiceover artist
- Timothy Beers (born 1957), American astrophysicist
- Tony Beers (1962–2018), Australian rules footballer
- William Beers (disambiguation), various people

== See also ==
- De Beers
