= Pirrie =

Pirrie is a surname. Notable people with the surname include:

- Alexander Mactier Pirrie FRAI (1882–1907), Scottish anthropologist
- Chloe Pirrie (born 1987), Scottish actress
- Dick Pirrie (1920–1944), Australian rules footballer
- Kevin Pirrie (1922–2006), Australian rules footballer
- Richard Pirrie (1879–1962), former Australian rules footballer
- Stephen Pirrie (born 1961), former Australian rules footballer
- William Pirrie, 1st Viscount Pirrie, KP, PC, PC (Ire) (1847–1924), British shipbuilder and businessman
- William Pirrie (surgeon) FRSE LLD (1807–1882), Scottish surgeon and medical author
- William Pirrie Sinclair (1837–1900), politician in the United Kingdom, twice elected to the House of Commons

== See also ==
- Pirrie v McFarlane, landmark decision of the High Court of Australia on Intergovernmental immunity between tiers of government in the Australian Constitution
- Piri (disambiguation)
- Pirie (disambiguation)
- Pirri
