= Hayden McLean =

Australian rules footballer (born 1999)

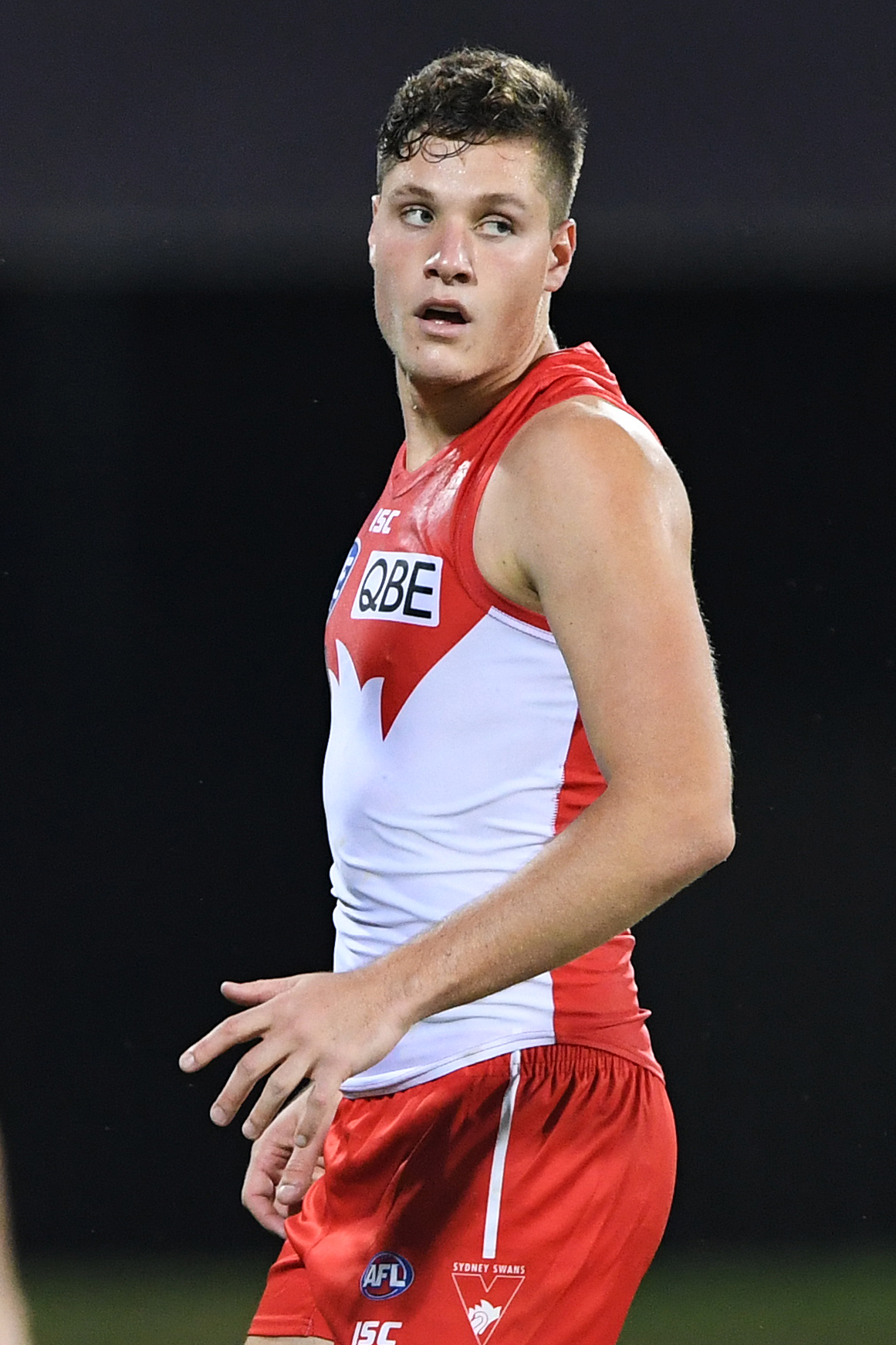
- McLean playing in the NEAFL in 2019

Personal information
- Nickname: Dossa
- Born: 20 January 1999 (age 27)
- Original team: Sandringham Dragons (TAC Cup)
- Draft: Pre-season supplemental selection, 2019
- Debut: Round 18, 2019, Sydney vs. Fremantle, at Optus Stadium
- Height: 198 cm (6 ft 6 in)
- Weight: 100 kg (220 lb)
- Position: Ruckman/key forward

Club information
- Current club: Sydney
- Number: 2

Playing career^{1}
Years	Club	Games (Goals)
2019–	Sydney	108 (113)
- ^{1} Playing statistics correct to the end of round 22, 2026.

Hayden McLean (born 20 January 1999) is an Australian rules footballer playing for the Carlton Football Club in the Australian Football League (AFL). A 1.98-metre tall who can play as a ruckman or key forward, McLean began his career in the TAC Cup before a season in the Victorian Football League (VFL). He was recruited by Sydney on the eve of the 2019 season as a pre-season supplemental selection, and made his AFL debut later that year.

== Junior career ==
McLean attended St. Bede’s College in Mentone. He played junior football for the Beaumaris Sharks, where he was coached by Dermott Brereton before joining the Sandringham Dragons in the TAC Cup. He also was a member of the AFL Academy – spending time at the Sydney Swans as part of the development program – and represented Vic Metro at the AFL Under 18 Championships. In 2017, McLean became Sandringham's captain and Vic Metro's vice-captain, but was overlooked in the 2017 AFL draft.

He began playing in the VFL for the Sandringham Zebras, who were affiliated with AFL club St Kilda. McLean played 13 matches in 2018, averaging 5.2 marks, 10.3 hit-outs and 13.2 disposals and rucking against AFL-listed players including Matthew Leuenberger, Braydon Preuss and Zac Smith. He was also named the club's best first-year player for 2018. McLean trained with St Kilda in November, hoping to be selected in the 2018 AFL draft, and was named by Fox Sports, which considered him similar to Adelaide ruck/forward Josh Jenkins, as a likely mature-age recruit. However, he was again overlooked and moved to Adelaide to play with South Australian National Football League (SANFL) club South Adelaide in 2019.

== AFL career ==
McLean was recruited by Sydney in March 2019 as a pre-season supplemental selection to cover the loss of defender Jack Maibaum to a season-ending anterior cruciate ligament injury. His recruitment also increased the club's depth of tall players after Kurt Tippett's retirement. McLean's selection was criticised by SANFL officials, as it deprived South Adelaide of an important recruit only a fortnight before their 2019 season began, leaving them unable to find a replacement in time. McLean spent most of his first season in Sydney's North East Australian Football League (NEAFL) side, before a call-up to the AFL team in round 18 – a challenging match-up rucking alongside Robbie Fox against Fremantle veteran Aaron Sandilands. He played three more matches to finish the season and extended his contract with Sydney to 2020.

=== 2021 ===
He kicked a career-high four goals in the Round 7 win against Geelong.

=== 2022 ===
McLean was selected for the 2022 AFL Grand Final by the Swans after not playing at senior level since round eight that season, making for a 140-day gap between senior games. This made it the second-biggest gap for players listed as inclusions for a grand final.

=== 2023 ===
Following the 2023 season, McLean signed a four-year contract extension to stay with the Swans until 2027

== Personal life ==
McLean is a third-generation VFL/AFL footballer, with his father Paul McLean playing for Fitzroy and his grandfather Tom McLean playing for Melbourne & North Melbourne. McLean's uncle, Glenn McLean, also played for Melbourne & Collingwood.

== Statistics ==
Updated to the end of round 22, 2026.

Legend
G	Goals	K	Kicks	D	Disposals	T	Tackles
B	Behinds	H	Handballs	M	Marks	H/O	Hit-outs

Season	Team	No.	Games	Totals								Averages (per game)								Votes
Season	Team	No.	Games	G	B	K	H	D	M	T	H/O	G	B	K	H	D	M	T	H/O	Votes
2019	Sydney	41	4	0	1	23	20	43	12	19	53	0.0	0.3	5.8	5.0	10.8	3.0	4.8	13.3	0
2020 (Note: The 2020 season was played with 17 home-and-away matches per team (down from 22) and 16-minute quarters with time on (down from 20-minute quarters with time on) due to the impact of the COVID-19 pandemic.)	Sydney	41	6	5	1	24	14	38	13	15	14	0.8	0.2	4.0	2.3	6.3	2.2	2.5	2.3	0
2021	Sydney	41	12	11	6	67	35	102	52	23	30	0.9	0.5	5.6	2.9	8.5	4.3	1.9	2.5	1
2022	Sydney	2	9	11	3	47	34	81	28	14	38	1.2	0.3	5.2	3.8	9.0	3.1	1.6	4.2	0
2023	Sydney	2	22	21	14	150	121	271	97	55	213	1.0	0.6	6.8	5.5	12.3	4.4	2.5	9.7	1
2024	Sydney	2	26	27	19	179	107	286	116	59	179	1.0	0.7	6.9	4.1	11.0	4.5	2.3	6.9	0
2025	Sydney	2	19	25	12	106	71	177	68	32	72	1.3	0.6	5.6	3.7	9.3	3.6	1.7	3.8	1
2026	Sydney	2	10	13	3	44	39	83	23	15	62	1.3	0.3	4.4	3.9	8.3	2.3	1.5	6.2	0
Career			108	113	59	640	441	1081	409	232	661	1.0	0.5	5.9	4.1	10.0	3.8	2.1	6.1	3
