= Braddy =

Braddy is a surname. Notable people with this surname include:

- Craig Braddy (born 1959), Australian rules footballer
- Johanna Braddy, American actress
- Paul Braddy (born 1939), Australian state politician
- Pauline Braddy (1922–1996), American jazz drummer
- Robert Braddy (born 1941), American college baseball coach
- Shane Braddy (born 1960), Australian rules footballer

== See also ==
- Braddy Field, baseball venue in Jackson, Mississippi, United States
