= Bruce West =

Bruce West may refer to:

- Bruce West (artist) (1939–2021), American artist
- Bruce West (federal electoral district), Canadian electoral district until 1903
- Bruce West (provincial electoral district), an electoral riding in Ontario, Canada
- Bruce West (footballer) (born 1962), Australian rules footballer in Victoria Football League
- Bruce West (newspaperman) (1912–1990), columnist for The Globe and Mail
