= Glenn McLean (footballer) =

Australian rules footballer

Personal information
- Born: 10 July 1961 (age 65)
- Original team: Sandringham
- Height: 194 cm (6 ft 4 in)
- Weight: 91 kg (201 lb)

Playing career^{1}
Years	Club	Games (Goals)
1980–1984	Melbourne	42 (8)
1984	Collingwood	2 (0)
Total		44 (8)
- ^{1} Playing statistics correct to the end of 1984.

Glenn McLean (born 10 July 1961) is a former Australian rules footballer who played with Melbourne and Collingwood in the Victorian Football League (VFL).

McLean, whose father Tom was a Melbourne player in the 1950s, attended Moorabbin Technical School and played his early football at Beaumaris. He came to Melbourne from Sandringham in the Victorian Football Association (VFA). A ruckman, McLean managed just three senior VFL appearances in 1980 and 1981. McLean was however regularly selected in 1982, with veteran Garry Baker on the sidelines because of a knee injury and another ruckman Michael Byrne crossing to Hawthorn. McLean played in nine of the first ten rounds that year, before breaking his wrist, but returned to finish with 15 games for the season. In the 1983 VFL season he shared ruck duties with Brownlow Medalist Peter Moore and was the only Melbourne player to appear in all 22 rounds. McLean finished fifth in Melbourne's best and fairest.

In 1984, McLean was the centre of controversy over his attempt early in the season to move from Melbourne to Collingwood. The clearance wrangle went to the supreme court and McLean was eventually let go by Melbourne, in a trade which secured the club Tony Keenan. He played in rounds 15 and 16, before losing his place in the Collingwood team. In January 1986, McLean was one of five players sacked by the club, along with Graeme Allan, Allen Eade, Tony Kelly and Jim McAllester.

McLean's brother Paul played one game for VFL club Fitzroy in 1987.
