= Andrew Guthrie =

Australian rules footballer

Andrew Merryweather

Personal information
- Born: 18 January 1961 (age 65)
- Original team: Doncaster
- Height: 192 cm (6 ft 4 in)
- Weight: 83 kg (183 lb)

Playing career^{1}
Years	Club	Games (Goals)
1982	Fitzroy	1 (0)
1988	Essendon	5 (0)
Total		6 (0)
- ^{1} Playing statistics correct to the end of 1988.

Andrew Guthrie (born 18 January 1961), known as Andrew Merryweather during his football career, is a former Australian rules footballer who played with Fitzroy and Essendon in the Victorian Football League (VFL). He used his step father's surname Merryweather during his playing career, then later changed back to his birth name.

A Doncaster recruit, he made his only appearance for Fitzroy in the 1982 VFL season, against Melbourne at Waverley Park. He got another chance to play VFL football six seasons later, when he was called up by Essendon, having spent the previous years playing local football. Used as a defender, he appeared in the first five rounds of the 1988 season.

His sons, Cameron Guthrie and Zac Guthrie play for Geelong.
