= Paul McLean (Australian footballer) =

Australian rules footballer

Personal information
- Full name: Paul McLean
- Born: 1 January 1965 (age 61)
- Height: 196 cm (6 ft 5 in)
- Weight: 92 kg (203 lb)

Playing career^{1}
Years	Club	Games (Goals)
1987	Fitzroy	1 (0)
- ^{1} Playing statistics correct to the end of 1987.

Paul McLean (born 1 January 1965) is a former Australian rules footballer who played 1 game for Fitzroy in the Victorian Football League (VFL) in 1987. He was recruited by Fitzroy from Melbourne during the 1986 season.

He is the brother of Glenn McLean, who played for Melbourne and Collingwood, and the son of Tom McLean, who played for Melbourne and North Melbourne. Paul is the father of Sydney Swans player Hayden McLean.
