= Darren Brown =

Darren Brown may refer to:

- Darren Brown (musician) (1962–2006), English singer and guitarist of Mega City Four
- Darren Brown (footballer) (born 1965), Australian rules footballer
- Darren Brown (rugby league) (born 1969), Australian rugby league player
- Derren Brown (born 1971), English illusionist and mentalist who previously used the stage name Darren V. Brown

== See also ==
- Daren Brown (born 1967), American baseball manager
