= 1982 Brownlow Medal =

- Winner: Brian Wilson (Melbourne); 23 votes

Television/radio coverage
- Network: Seven Network

The 1982 Brownlow Medal was the 55th year the award was presented to the player adjudged the fairest and best player during the Victorian Football League (VFL) home and away season. Brian Wilson of the Melbourne Football Club won the medal by polling twenty-three votes during the 1982 VFL season.

== Leading votegetters ==
| | Player | Votes |
|---|---|---|
| 1st | Brian Wilson (Melbourne) | 23 |
| 2nd | Ross Glendinning (North Melbourne) | 18 |
| =3rd | Terry Wallace (Hawthorn) | 17 |
| =3rd | Leigh Matthews (Hawthorn) | 17 |
| 5th | Gary Dempsey (North Melbourne) | 16 |
| 6th | Barry Round (Sydney) | 15 |
| | Jim Jess (Richmond)* | 15 |
| =7th | Peter Daicos (Collingwood) | 14 |
| =7th | Tony Buhagiar (Essendon) | 14 |
| =7th | Garry Wilson (Fitzroy) | 14 |
| 10th | Robert Flower (Melbourne) | 13 |
| | Val Perovic (Carlton)* | 13 |

* The player was ineligible to win the medal due to suspension by the VFL Tribunal during the year.
