= John B. Chambers =

American businessman (born c. 1955)

John Burton Chambers (born c. 1955) is deputy head of the Sovereign Debt Ratings Group and chairman of the Sovereign Debt Committee at Standard and Poor's (S&P). Along with David T. Beers, Chambers earned significant attention in August 2011 for his role in downgrading the credit rating of United States Treasury bonds to AA+. Prior to this, the United States had maintained a AAA credit rating since 1941.

Chambers holds a BA in English literature and philosophy from Grinnell College (1977) and an MA in English literature from Columbia University. After working five years in various roles as sous directeur (deputy director), assistant comptroller, and vice president for Banque Indosuez, Chambers joined S&P in 1993. He became deputy head of S&P's Sovereign Debt Ratings Group in 1997.
