= Andrew Preston =

Andrew Preston may refer to:

- Andrew Preston (businessman) (1846–1924), American businessman
- Andrew Preston (historian) (born 1973), Canadian historian
- Andy Preston (footballer) (born 1957), Australian rules footballer
- Andy Preston (politician) (born 1966), English politician, charity chairman, and businessman

== See also ==
- Andrew Preston Peabody (1811–1893), American clergyman and author
