= Stephen Pirrie =

Australian rules footballer

Personal information
- Full name: Stephen Pirrie
- Born: 23 March 1961 (age 65)
- Original team: Old Xaverians (VAFA)
- Height: 191 cm (6 ft 3 in)
- Weight: 92 kg (203 lb)

Playing career^{1}
Years	Club	Games (Goals)
1982, 1984	Richmond	11 (0)
1984	St Kilda	7 (0)
1985	Essendon	1 (0)
Total		19 (0)
- ^{1} Playing statistics correct to the end of 1985.

Stephen Pirrie (born 23 March 1961) is a former Australian rules footballer who played with Richmond, St Kilda and Essendon in the Victorian Football League (VFL).

Pirrie played VFL reserves football for Hawthorn before moving to Victorian Amateur Football Association (VAFA) club Old Xaverians, winning the J.N. Woodrow Medal for Best and Fairest player in the VAFA A section in 1981.

Recruited by Richmond prior to the 1982 VFL season, Pirrie played as a defender in the final ten rounds of the 1982 VFL Home and Away season before being dropped prior for the finals.

Pirrie was unable to break into the Richmond senior side in 1983 but played the opening round of the 1984 VFL season before being traded to St Kilda, in return for Jeff Dunne. He was reported for misconduct during his final game for Richmond, in that he threw his mouthguard to hinder Footscray's full forward Simon Beasley, who kicked 11 goals. He was later found not guilty of the charge. He was only able to make seven appearances at his new club and in 1985 made his way to reigning premiers Essendon, where he played just once.

He had a brief stint with Port Melbourne in 1987, playing 2 games and scoring 8 goals.

Pirrie's father Kevin and his uncle, Richard played for Hawthorn while his grandfather, Richard Pirrie Snr. played for Melbourne in the VFL, and for Richmond in the Victorian Football Association (VFA).

== See also ==
- List of Australian rules football families
