= Michael O'Sullivan (footballer) =

Australian rules footballer

Personal information
- Born: 5 April 1962 (age 64)
- Original team: Seymour
- Height: 185 cm (6 ft 1 in)
- Weight: 76 kg (168 lb)
- Position: Midfielder

Playing career^{1}
Years	Club	Games (Goals)
1982–1986	Melbourne	53 (11)
1988	Essendon	1 (0)
Total		54 (11)
- ^{1} Playing statistics correct to the end of 1988.

Michael O'Sullivan (born 5 April 1962) is a former Australian rules footballer who played with Melbourne and Essendon in the Victorian Football League (VFL).

O'Sullivan, a left-footer, was originally from Seymour and went to Assumption College. He was a member of Melbourne's Under 19s premiership winning team in 1981.

He had a strong first season with Melbourne, in 1982, when he played in all 22 rounds and amassed 314 kicks, the second most at the club behind Adrian Battiston, the only other player not to miss a game that year.

In the opening round of the 1983 season, against Collingwood, O'Sullivan badly injured his shoulder. A staple that had been inserted into his shoulder during his Under 19s career had broken and as a result he missed the rest of the season.

O'Sullivan was unlucky again in 1984, missing the second half of the season after breaking his jaw in Melbourne's round 10 win over Richmond.

He played 18 games in 1985, but only five in 1986 and didn't play senior football in 1987.

His only appearance for Essendon came in round 19, 1988, against Geelong.

O'Sullivan coached Seymour in the 1992 Goulburn Valley Football League season.
