= Mark Beers =

Mark Beers may refer to:

- Mark H. Beers (1954–2009), American geriatrician
- Mark Beers (footballer) (born 1965), former Australian rules football player
