= Paul Rizonico =

Australian rules footballer

Personal information
- Full name: Paul Rizonico
- Born: 16 February 1966 (age 60)
- Original team: Bundoora Juniors
- Debut: 16 August 1986, Collingwood vs. Hawthorn, at Princes Park
- Height: 183 cm (6 ft 0 in)
- Weight: 73 kg (161 lb)

Playing career^{1}
Years	Club	Games (Goals)
1986–1988	Collingwood	17 (7)
1989–1994	Port Adelaide (SANFL)	102 (22)
- ^{1} Playing statistics correct to the end of 1994.

Career highlights
- Joseph Wren Memorial Trophy 1987; Port Adelaide premiership player 1990, 1992

Paul Rizonico (born 16 February 1966) is a former Australian rules footballer who played with Collingwood in the Victorian Football League (VFL) and with Port Adelaide in the South Australian National Football League (SANFL).

Before joining Collingwood at the VFL level, Rizonico played for Bundoora's junior team.

In the 1987 season, Rizonico played 12 senior games and scored 5 goals for Collingwood, as well as contributing at the reserves level. For his latter contribution Rizonico won the best and fairest award, the Joseph Wren Memorial Trophy, jointly with Mark Beers, when it was first awarded in 1987.

After leaving Collingwood, Rizonico joined Port Adelaide in the SANFL and played with them for six years, winning two premierships.
