= Karl Fedke =

Australian rules footballer and coach

Personal information
- Born: 28 July 1962 (age 64)
- Original team: Kerang
- Height: 185 cm (6 ft 1 in)
- Weight: 80 kg (176 lb)

Playing career^{1}
| Years | Club | Games (Goals) |
| 1982 | Geelong | 2 (0) |
- ^{1} Playing statistics correct to the end of 1982.

Karl Fedke (born 28 July 1962) is a former Australian rules footballer who played with Geelong in the Victorian Football League (VFL).

Fedke, recruited from Kerang, appeared for Geelong in the final two rounds of the 1982 VFL season, an 11-point loss to Essendon at Windy Hill and another narrow loss to Collingwood at Kardinia Park. He performed well on debut, in the ruck against Essendon's Madden brothers. He was a member of Geelong's reserves premiership team that year.

He went to Glenelg in 1983.

In 2010, Fedke became senior coach of Corio.
