= Phil Maddock =

Australian rules footballer

Personal information
- Full name: Phillip Maddock
- Born: 9 October 1961 (age 65)
- Original team: Winchelsea (BFL)
- Height: 182 cm (6 ft 0 in)
- Weight: 80 kg (176 lb)

Playing career^{1}
Years	Club	Games (Goals)
1982	Geelong	3 (1)
- ^{1} Playing statistics correct to the end of 1982.

Phillip Maddock (born 9 October 1961) is a former Australian rules footballer who played with Geelong in the Victorian Football League (VFL).

Maddock, who came from Winchelsea, played in three reserves premierships with Geelong (1980, 1981, 1982). His three senior appearances for Geelong all came in the 1982 VFL season, rounds three to five, before he dropped out of the team with knee re-constructions.

He was captain of St Peters in 1985.
