= Lindsay Sneddon =

Australian rules footballer

Personal information
- Full name: Lindsay Sneddon
- Born: 29 January 1962 (age 64)
- Original team: Deer Park
- Height: 194 cm (6 ft 4 in)
- Weight: 89 kg (196 lb)

Playing career^{1}
Years	Club	Games (Goals)
1982	Footscray	2 (1)
1985	Sydney Swans	2 (0)
Total		4 (1)
- ^{1} Playing statistics correct to the end of 1985.

Lindsay Sneddon (born 28 January 1962) is a former Australian rules footballer who played with Footscray and the Sydney Swans in the Victorian Football League (VFL).

Sneddon was originally from Deer Park. A ruckman, he made two appearances for Footscray in the 1982 VFL season, then didn't play senior football again until 1985, when he played twice for the Swans.
