= Tony Keenan =

Australian rules footballer

Personal information
- Born: 6 May 1964 (age 62)
- Original team: Greensborough (DVFL)
- Height: 195 cm (6 ft 5 in)
- Weight: 92 kg (203 lb)

Playing career^{1}
Years	Club	Games (Goals)
1982–1984	Collingwood	3 (0)
1988–1989	Norwood	6 (1)
Total		9 (1)
- ^{1} Playing statistics correct to the end of 1989.

Tony Keenan (born 6 May 1964) is a former Australian rules footballer who played with Collingwood in the Victorian Football League (VFL).

Keenan, a ruckman and key position player originally from Diamond Valley Football League club Greensborough, was a member of the 1980 Victorian Teal Cup team and captained the 1981 Victorian Teal Cup team, which featured future greats Dermott Brereton, Gary Pert and Paul Salmon.

Keenan was recruited by Collingwood in 1982 and played three VFL games, two in 1982 and one in 1984. He was traded to Melbourne midway through the 1984 season, in return for fellow ruckman Glenn McLean, but suffered a knee injury before joining his new club and didn't play for the rest of the year. The following season Keenan was again on the sidelines after dislocating a shoulder and undergoing reconstructive surgery.

Keenan left Melbourne at the end of the 1985 VFL season without playing a senior game, moving first to Victorian Football Association (VFA) club Preston, Victorian Amateur Football Association (VAFA) side Bulleen-Templestowe and South Australian National Football League (SANFL) club Norwood before his retirement in 1989.
