= Mark Lawson (footballer) =

Australian rules footballer

Personal information
- Born: 31 May 1962 (age 64)
- Original team: North Reservoir
- Height: 175 cm (5 ft 9 in)
- Weight: 85 kg (187 lb)

Playing career^{1}
Years	Club	Games (Goals)
1982–1984	Collingwood	11 (0)
1985–1986	Port Adelaide	36 (15)
- ^{1} Playing statistics correct to the end of 1984.

Mark Lawson (born 31 May 1962) is a former Australian rules footballer who played with Collingwood in the Victorian Football League (VFL).

Lawson, a North Reservoir recruit, made his debut for Collingwood in round 17 of the 1982 VFL season and remained in the team for the rest of the year. He played four games in 1983, then just one in 1984. After a stint with Port Adelaide, Lawson returned to Melbourne and played with Preston.
