= Gordon Towan =

Australian rules footballer (born 1954)

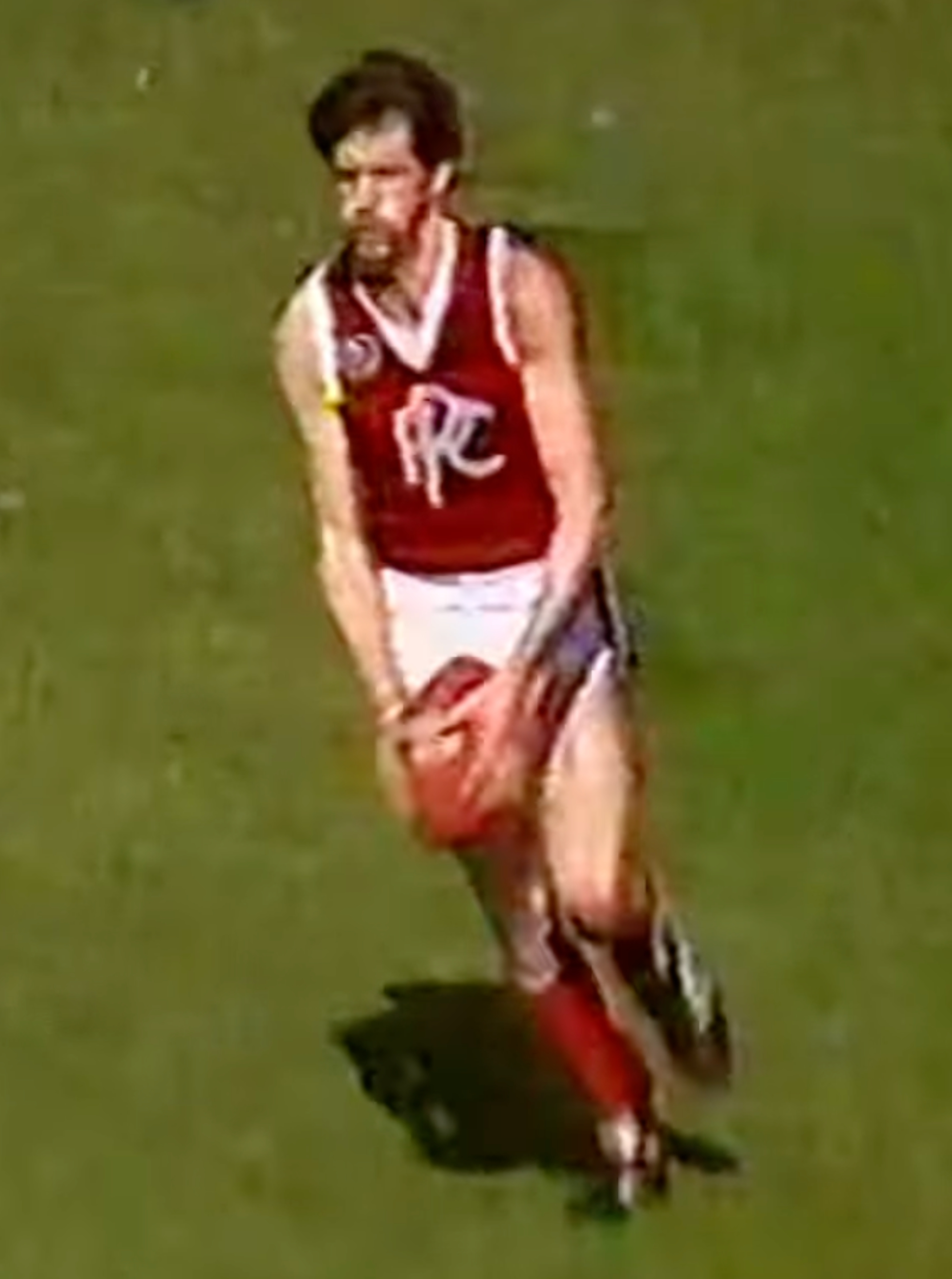
- Towan playing for Preston in 1982

Personal information
- Born: 24 March 1954 (age 72)
- Original team: ANZ Bank / Preston
- Height: 188 cm (6 ft 2 in)
- Weight: 83 kg (183 lb)

Playing career^{1}
Years	Club	Games (Goals)
1982	Collingwood	2 (0)
- ^{1} Playing statistics correct to the end of 1982.

Gordon Towan (born 24 March 1954) is a former Australian rules footballer who played with Collingwood in the Victorian Football League (VFL).

== Early VFA career ==
Towan spent four years playing for amateur club ANZ Bank, before commencing at Victorian Football Association (VFA) side Preston in 1978. He was used as a full-back by Preston.

== Collingwood ==
In the 1982 VFL season, with Tom Hafey coached Collingwood having a slow start to the season, winning just one of their first seven games, a decision was made to approach 28-year-old Towan, who had previously spent a pre-season at the club. He was cleared by Preston in time for Collingwood's round eight fixture against the Sydney Swans, but he instead played in the reserves. The following week, against Hawthorn at Victoria Park, Towan was selected to make his debut. He played as a back pocket and at times was matched up against Gary Buckenara and a young Gary Ablett. Collingwood's next game was at the Melbourne Cricket Ground, where Towan made his second VFL appearance, in a seven-point loss to Melbourne. Hafey was sacked two days later and replaced by Mick Erwin. Towan was one of the casualties at the selection table, dropped for Collingwood's round 11 game against St Kilda. Three weeks later he was back playing with Preston.

== Back at Preston ==
He continued at Preston in 1983 and despite battling a hamstring injury was picked in the team which defeated Geelong West in that year's VFA Grand Final. He retired from playing at the end of 1986, and played a total of 116 games for Preston. He later served as president of the club.

In 1984 he was appointed coach of Reservoir-Lakeside.
