= Tony Beers =

Australian rules footballer (1962–2018)

Personal information
- Full name: Anthony Brian Beers
- Born: 7 November 1962
- Died: 11 May 2018 (aged 55)
- Original team: Parade College
- Height: 183 cm (6 ft 0 in)
- Weight: 83 kg (183 lb)

Playing career^{1}
Years	Club	Games (Goals)
1982–1983	Collingwood	5 (1)
1984–1990	Claremont	107 (89)
- ^{1} Playing statistics correct to the end of 1990.

Anthony Brian Beers (7 November 1962 – 11 May 2018) was an Australian rules footballer who played with Collingwood in the Victorian Football League (VFL) and Claremont in the West Australian Football League.

Beers, the son of 1958 Collingwood premiership player Brian Beers, captained the Parade College XVIII in 1980. He made two appearances for Collingwood in the 1982 VFL season and played a further three games in 1983. His younger brother, Mark Beers, was also a Collingwood player.

From 1984 to 1990 he played for Claremont, appearing in 107 games. He represented Western Australia in 1988, against the VFA at Subiaco Oval, a match the home state won by 86 points. The fixture was a curtain raiser to the State of Origin encounter between Western Australia and Victoria. He was a centre half back in Claremont's 1987 and 1989 premiership teams.
