= Malcolm Smith (Australian footballer) =

Australian rules footballer

Personal information
- Full name: Malcolm D. Smith
- Born: 25 May 1959 (age 67)
- Original team: Beaumaris (SESFL)
- Height: 185 cm (6 ft 1 in)
- Weight: 81 kg (179 lb)

Playing career^{1}
Years	Club	Games (Goals)
1982	St Kilda	1 (0)
- ^{1} Playing statistics correct to the end of 1982.

Malcolm D. Smith (born 25 May 1959) is a former Australian rules footballer who played with St Kilda in the Victorian Football League (VFL).

A Beaumaris recruit, Smith played one league match for St Kilda, which came in the final round of the 1982 VFL season, an 88-point loss to Hawthorn. Smith had nine disposals.

He is the father of Sydney footballer Nick Smith.
