= James Greig Smith =

Scottish surgeon (1854–1897)

Prof James Greig Smith FRSE (1854–1897) was a 19th-century Scottish surgeon and author of the highly successful textbook Abdominal Surgery.

A keen sportsman, his interests included yachting, shooting, golf and boxing. He was also a heavy smoker.

== Life ==
He was born at Nigg, a small village just outside Aberdeen. He was educated at Aberdeen Grammar School under William Barrack then studied for a general degree at Aberdeen University, gaining a general degree (MA) in 1873, then studied Medicine under Prof William Pirrie graduating MB ChB in 1876. In the same year he joined Bristol Royal Infirmary as a Junior House Surgeon. In 1879 he was promoted to Senior Surgeon (aged only 25).

In 1883 he was elected a Fellow of the Royal Society of Edinburgh. His proposers were William Stirling, John Charles Ogilvie Will, Joseph Lister and Henry Marshall.

From 1883 to 1890 he edited the Bristol Medico-Chirurgical Journal with L. M. Griffiths. From 1888 he lectured in Surgery at University College, Bristol. In 1893 he became president of the Bristol Medico-Chirurgical Society, in the same year becoming professor of surgery at the university.

He died in Bristol on 29 May 1897 following a short period of pneumonia. He was only 43 years old. He is buried at Redland Green Cemetery.

== Publications ==
- Abdominal Surgery (1888 and multiple later editions) also translated into French, German and Italian

== Family ==
He was married with one daughter.
