= Darren Grant (footballer) =

Australian rules footballer

Personal information
- Full name: Darren Grant
- Born: 25 April 1963 (age 63)
- Original team: Sale City (NGFL)
- Height: 191 cm (6 ft 3 in)
- Weight: 84 kg (185 lb)

Playing career^{1}
Years	Club	Games (Goals)
1982	Footscray	1 (0)
- ^{1} Playing statistics correct to the end of 1982.

Darren Grant (born 25 April 1963) is a former Australian rules footballer who played with Footscray in the Victorian Football League (VFL).

Grant was originally from Sale City, in the North Gippsland Football League. His only league appearance for Footscray was in their round 18 loss to Carlton at Princes Park in the 1982 VFL season. The 129 point winning margin was a then club record for Carlton, over any team. He later played in South Australia with Central District and Woodville.
