= Paul Ryan (Australian footballer) =

Australian rules footballer

Personal information
- Born: 23 May 1962 (age 64)
- Original team: Hamilton
- Height: 180 cm (5 ft 11 in)
- Weight: 73 kg (161 lb)

Playing career^{1}
Years	Club	Games (Goals)
1982	Collingwood	6 (1)
- ^{1} Playing statistics correct to the end of 1982.

Paul Ryan (born 23 May 1962) is a former Australian rules footballer who played with Collingwood in the Victorian Football League (VFL).

Ryan, a Hamilton recruit, played six senior games for Collingwood, all in the 1982 VFL season.
