= Paul Armstrong (Australian footballer) =

Australian rules footballer and administrator

Personal information
- Born: 10 January 1957 (age 69)
- Original team: East Ballarat
- Height: 185 cm (6 ft 1 in)
- Weight: 83 kg (183 lb)

Playing career^{1}
Years	Club	Games (Goals)
1982	St Kilda	12 (1)
- ^{1} Playing statistics correct to the end of 1982.

Paul Armstrong (born 10 January 1957) is a former Australian rules football player and administrator. He played with St Kilda in the Victorian Football League (VFL).

Armstrong, a defender, came to St Kilda from East Ballarat. He made 12 senior appearances for St Kilda, in the 1982 VFL season.

In 1994 Armstrong was appointed Football Manager of the Geelong Football Club and remained in that role until 1997, when he became Football Manager for the Western Bulldogs. He left the Bulldogs in 2002. From 2004 to 2008, Armstrong was the Football Operations Manager for Richmond. He then worked for the AFL Coaches Association, as Operations Manager.

Armstrong currently operates his own career consulting firm.
