= Anton Grbac =

Australian rules footballer

Personal information
- Born: 16 January 1961 (age 65)
- Original team: St Bernards
- Height: 189 cm (6 ft 2 in)
- Weight: 88 kg (194 lb)

Playing career^{1}
Years	Club	Games (Goals)
1982	Essendon	2 (0)
- ^{1} Playing statistics correct to the end of 1982.

Anton Grbac (born 16 January 1961) is a former Australian rules footballer who played with Essendon in the Victorian Football League (VFL).

Grbac, a defender, was recruited from St. Bernard's College. He made two league appearances for Essendon, late in the 1982 VFL season, in wins over St Kilda at Moorabbin Oval and Geelong at Windy Hill.

He went to South Australian National Football League club West Torrens in 1984.
