= Jamie Barham =

Australian rules footballer

Personal information
- Born: 1 December 1960 (age 65)
- Original team: Gisborne
- Height: 179 cm (5 ft 10 in)
- Weight: 75 kg (165 lb)

Playing career^{1}
Years	Club	Games (Goals)
1981	Melbourne	4 (1)
1982	Footscray	1 (0)
Total		5 (1)
- ^{1} Playing statistics correct to the end of 1982.

Jamie Barham (born 1 December 1960) is a former Australian rules footballer who played with Melbourne and Footscray in the Victorian Football League (VFL).

Originally from Hamilton, Barham was zoned to Collingwood, where his brother Ricky played, but took a different route to league football. He spent three seasons playing for Riddell District Football League club Gisborne, which were coached by another brother, Bill. This meant he instead joined Melbourne, when he commenced his league career.

Barham made four senior appearances for Melbourne in the 1981 VFL season and then played one game with Footscray in 1982. He was the first player since Vic Nankervis in the 1940s to have the misfortune of playing for two different wooden spoon teams in successive seasons.
