= William Heath Strange =

British physician and surgeon

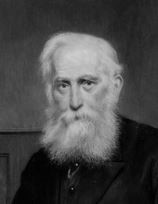
- William Heath Strange from a 1905 portrait by Walter Savage Cooper
- Born: 15 June 1837; Devizes, Wiltshire
- Died: 28 February 1907 (aged 69); Belsize Park, London
- Resting place: Highgate Cemetery
- Education: University of Aberdeen
- Occupations: Physician and surgeon
- Known for: Founding the Hampstead General Hospital
- Spouse: Anna Jane Pirrie

William Heath Strange (15 June 1837 – 28 February 1907) founded the Hampstead General Hospital on the site now occupied by the Royal Free Hospital.

== Early life and qualifications ==
William was born in Devizes, Wiltshire, the youngest son of Mary and Robert Strange, a solicitor. He started his medical training at St Thomas's Hospital and in September 1862 he sat the Examination in Arts at the Worshipful Company of Apothecaries, which was a prerequisite for those who wanted medical qualifications, but did not have a relevant university degree. In the Apothecaries Hall on that day there were 51 gentlemen candidates and one lady candidate, Elizabeth Garrett, later Elizabeth Garrett Anderson, the first woman to qualify in Britain as a physician and surgeon, who also founded a London hospital, the New Hospital for Women in Euston Road. Strange obtained his qualifications at the University of Aberdeen, graduating there MD and CM in 1866. One of his professors was William Pirrie, whose daughter he married, and to whose book Pirrie's Surgery he contributed an article on diseases of the rectum and anus, a specialist subject of Strange's.

== Career ==
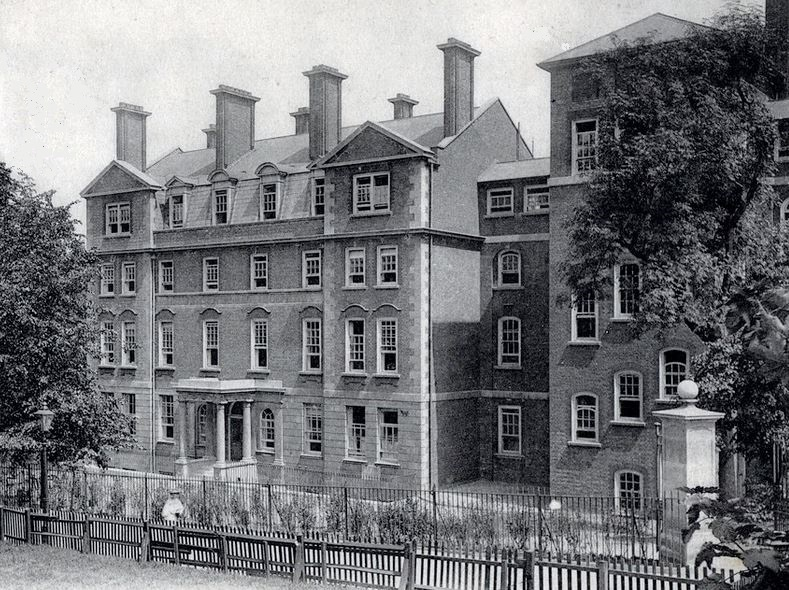
Hampstead General Hospital c. 1905

After qualifying he moved to the Belsize Park area of the Borough of Hampstead, starting a practice which would stretch over forty years. He was the founder of the dispensary in Long Acre, Covent Garden, which in 1871 developed into the London Medical Mission, remaining a member of its council until his death, as well as being on the staff of the Hampstead Provident Dispensary. It was whilst holding the latter office that he saw the need for Hampstead hospital accommodation for the treatment of many of his less well-off patients. In 1882, he purchased a house he had previously rented at 4 South Hill Park (Road), and by the end of the year fifteen patients had been admitted to the Hampstead Home and Nursing Institute. From the outset "Heath" as he became known, trained women to become district nurses, caring for the sick in their own homes on payment of a fee. A move to larger premises at 3 & 4 Parliament Hill (Road) allowed patients to be surgically treated under the best conditions, instead of being operated on in their own homes. It also allowed the nurses to attend lectures in anatomy and physiology as well as surgical and medical nursing, in an era when parents frowned on their daughters earning a living.

By 1894 the hospital was well-established, with the general wards free for the local poor, and 12 shillings a week for those who could afford it. Indeed the demand was such that larger purpose-built premises with better out-patients facilities were needed. A site on Hampstead Green, Pond Street was purchased and in 1905 the Hampstead General Hospital, designed by Keith Young, was opened, initially with 50 beds. Heath, then in his late 60s, felt this was the appropriate time to step down from his role in the organisation, and resigned his post. The hospital was further expanded until in 1975, it was demolished to make way for the building of the new Royal Free Hospital.

== Family life and death ==
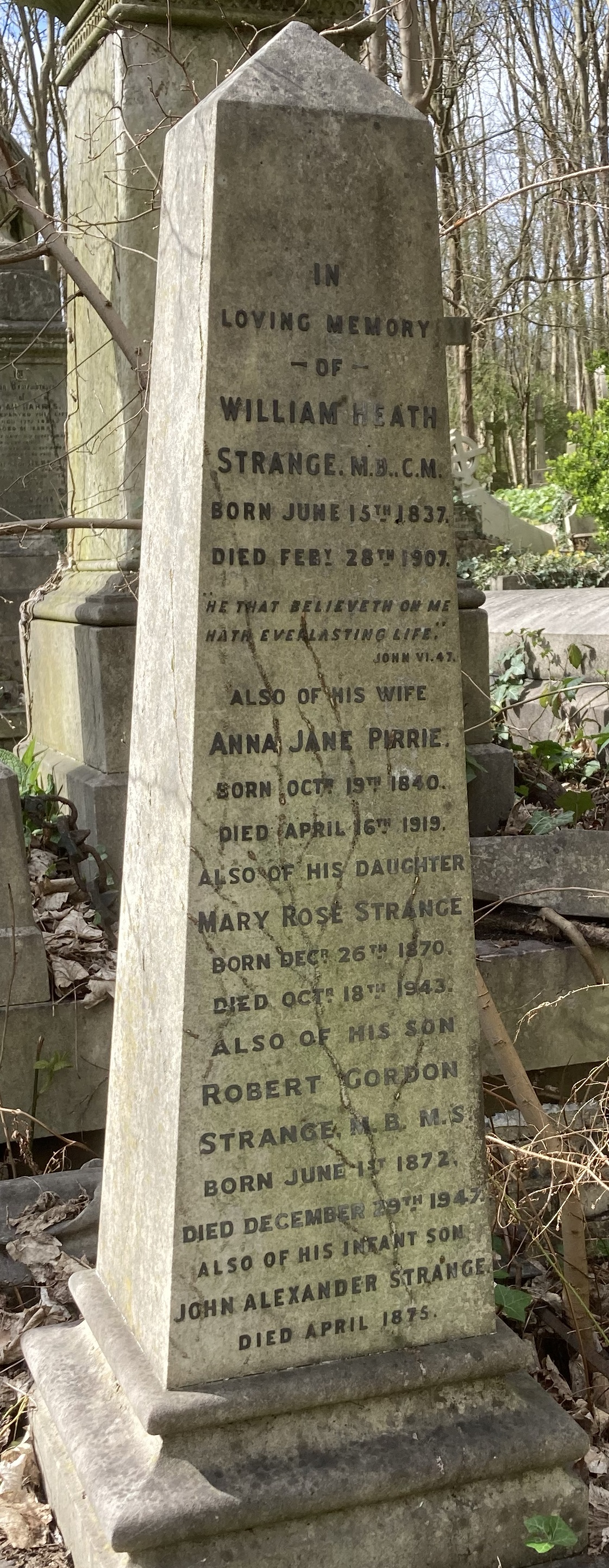
Family grave of William Heath Strange in Highgate Cemetery

William married Anna Jane Pirrie (1840–1919), the third daughter of William Pirrie, in Aberdeen on 24 May 1866. They had four children, William Pirrie (1869–1953), Mary Rose (1870–1943), Robert Gordon (1872–1947) and John Alexander (1875–1875).

William Heath Strange died suddenly, on the evening of 28 February 1907, as he was retiring for the night at his family home of many years, 2 Belsize Avenue. He is buried with his wife Anna, and all four of their children in a family grave on the eastern side of Highgate Cemetery, close to the graves of George Eliot and George Henry Lewes.
