= Alexander Mactier Pirrie =

Scottish anthropologist

Alexander Mactier Pirrie FRAI (1882–13 November 1907) was an early 20th century Scottish anthropologist.

== Life ==
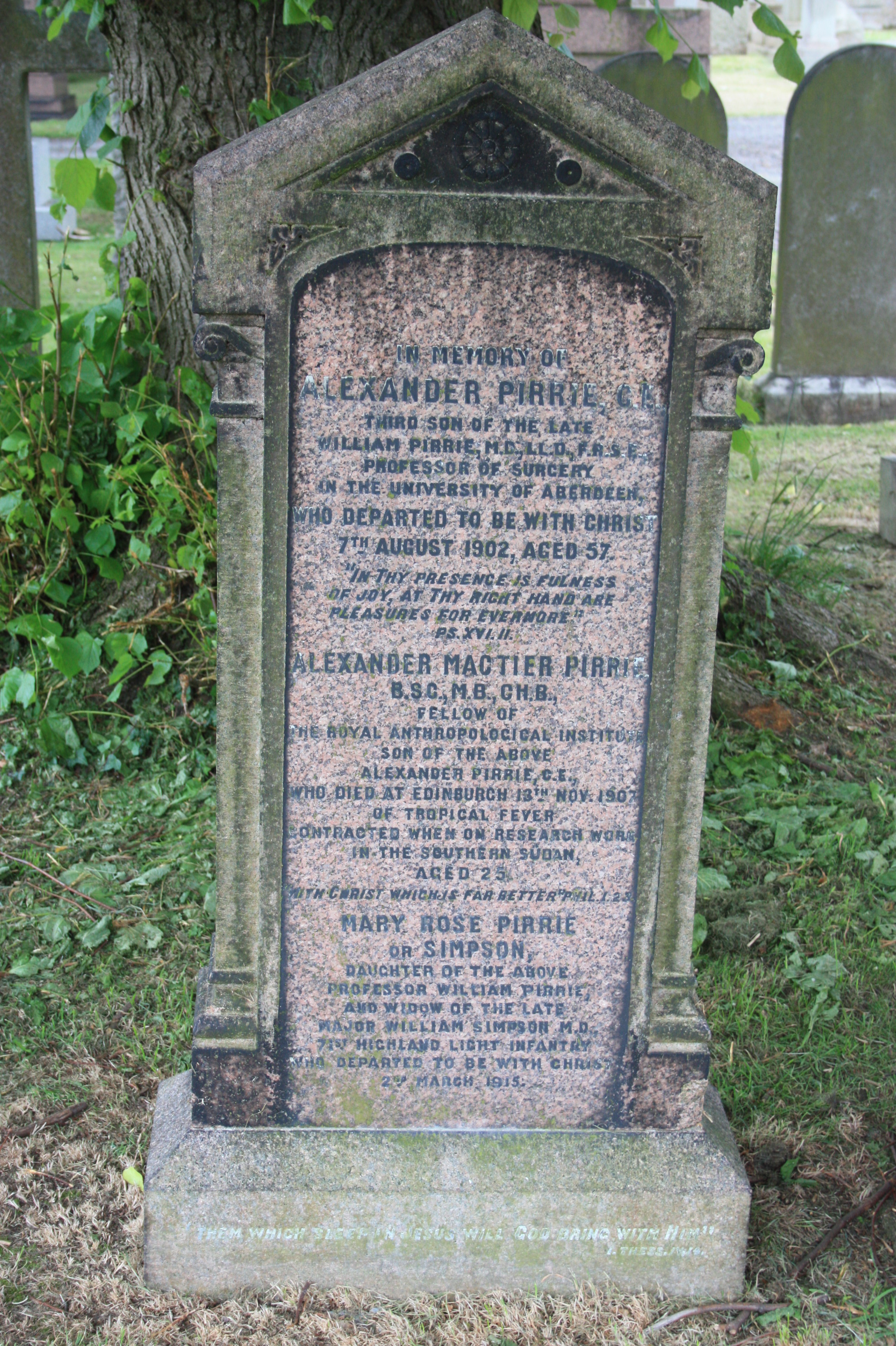
The grave of Alexander Mactier Pirrie, Dean Cemetery

He was the son of Alexander Pirrie, civil engineer (1845-1902), himself the son of Prof William Pirrie.

He studied anthropology at the University of Edinburgh graduating with a BSc in 1904. He then took a further postgraduate medical degree graduating MB ChB in 1906. He was created a Fellow of the Royal Anthropological Institute.

In 1906 he went to the Sudan with the Wellcome Research Institute to work in their laboratory in Khartoum. In 1907 he went on an expedition to Shilluk territory in the south. He took many photographs of the Nuba people in Renk. However, within a month he had contracted Kala-azar fever and he returned to Khartoum.

Hoping for improved treatment in Britain he sailed home but died at Chalmers Hospital in Edinburgh on 13 November 1907. He is buried in the north (Victorian) section of Dean Cemetery. The funeral was attended by Sir William Turner.

His Sudan journal is held by The National Archives at Kew.
