= Stephen McCarthy (Australian footballer) =

Australian rules footballer

Personal information
- Full name: Stephen McCarthy
- Born: 18 May 1962 (age 64)
- Original team: Ormond
- Height: 173 cm (5 ft 8 in)
- Weight: 76 kg (168 lb)

Playing career^{1}
| Years | Club | Games (Goals) |
| 1982–83 | Melbourne | 12 (9) |
- ^{1} Playing statistics correct to the end of 1983.

Stephen McCarthy (born 18 May 1962) is a former Australian rules footballer who played with Melbourne in the Victorian Football League (VFL).
