= Michael Coates =

Australian rules footballer

Personal information
- Full name: Michael Coates
- Born: 6 January 1961 (age 65); Melbourne
- Original team: Surrey Hills
- Height: 180 cm (5 ft 11 in)
- Weight: 80 kg (176 lb)
- Positions: Wing, Half-forward, Half-back

Playing career^{1}
Years	Club	Games (Goals)
1982–1984; 1986	Fitzroy	29 (5)
- ^{1} Playing statistics correct to the end of 1986.

Michael Coates is a former Australian rules footballer, who played for the Fitzroy Football Club in the Victorian Football League (VFL). He is the son of George Coates, an AFL Life Member and Fitzroy/Brisbane Lions Hall of Fame member. Michael was recruited to Fitzroy from Surrey Hills under the father-son rule. His first senior game was in 1982 (against Carlton) and played 29 senior games in total over the years 1982–1984, and 1986, after having briefly joined the Sydney Swans in 1985.
