= George Coates (footballer) =

Australian rules footballer

Personal information
- Full name: George Albert Phillip Coates
- Born: 3 July 1923; North Carlton
- Died: 16 February 2014 (aged 90)
- Original team: Fitzroy Sub-District
- Height: 175 cm (5 ft 9 in)
- Weight: 68 kg (150 lb)

Playing career^{1}
Years	Club	Games (Goals)
1947–1954	Fitzroy	128 (128)
- ^{1} Playing statistics correct to the end of 1954.

George Albert Phillip Coates (3 July 1923 – 16 February 2014) was an Australian rules footballer who played with Fitzroy in the Victorian Football League (VFL).

Coates had a delayed start to league football due to the war. He served as a Leading Aircraftman with the No. 67 Squadron of the Royal Australian Air Force. A rover, he made his debut in 1947 and proved to be a consistent goal-kicker for Fitzroy, kicking at least 20 goals in three of his first four seasons. Coates played finals football in 1947 and 1952, ending up on a losing preliminary final team on each occasion. He represented Victoria in 1949.

Once he left Fitzroy, Coates spent some time as coach of State Savings Bank in the Victorian Amateur Football Association.

Coates was later a Fitzroy administrator for over 20 years. His son, Michael, played for the club in the 1980s. In 1965 he designed the prowling lion logo which was used by Fitzroy on their guernseys and adopted by the Brisbane Lions.
