= Brian Wilson (Australian rules footballer) =

Australian rules footballer (born 1961)

Personal information
- Born: 30 September 1961 (age 65)
- Original team: Braybrook
- Height: 180 cm (5 ft 11 in)
- Weight: 82.5 kg (182 lb)

Playing career
Years	Club	Games (Goals)
1978–1979	Footscray	9 (5)
1980–1981	North Melbourne	39 (17)
1982–1990	Melbourne	154 (208)
1991	St Kilda	7 (16)
Total		209 (246)

Career highlights
- Brownlow Medal Winner: 1982; Melbourne leading Goalkicker: 1985; Victorian State Representative: 1982, 1983, 1988

Brian Wilson (born 30 September 1961) is a former Australian rules footballer in the Victorian Football League (VFL).

Early in his career, he played in the centre and later became a forward pocket. At Melbourne he developed into an aggressive player, winning possessions in packs and showed great handballing skills.

Believed to be the only player to have won a Brownlow Medal at his third club. At 20 years of age, he was also the youngest winner since Bob Skilton in 1959.

== Playing career ==
From the suburb of Braybrook in Melbourne, Wilson began his VFL career with the Footscray Football Club in 1978, playing four matches, after being recruited from the Braybrook Football Club.

Following the 1979 VFL season, Wilson transferred to North Melbourne, playing two seasons with the Kangaroos before moving to Melbourne ahead of the 1982 VFL season.

Wilson would play nine seasons with Melbourne, playing for the club in the 1988 VFL grand final loss against Hawthorn.

He would transfer to St Kilda ahead of the 1991 AFL season, before retiring at just 29 years of age at the end of the season, opting to pursue business interests.

He would also be involved in the Heidelberg Football Club where he had served as a coach and president.

=== Brownlow Medal ===
Wilson was a surprise winner of the 1982 Brownlow Medal as the VFL's best and fairest player for the 1982 VFL season, winning the award at just 20 years old, days before his 21st birthday. He polled 23 votes, five clear of North Melbourne's Ross Glendinning and six votes ahead of Hawthorn duo Leigh Matthews and Terry Wallace.

In the seasons following his medal win, Wilson struggled with the attention of being a Brownlow medallist, but was able to regain his form in the late 1980s.

Wilson revealed in 2018 that he had lost the medal, but that it was returned to him via the Melbourne Football Club in 2023.

== Personal life ==
Wilson is married and has two daughters.
