= Hector Beers =

English cricketer

Hector George Beers (1876–1954) was an English cricketer who played for Northamptonshire from 1914 to 1921. He was born in Potterspury, Northamptonshire on 29 April 1876 and died in Northampton on 11 February 1954. Beers appeared in 17 first-class matches as a right-handed batsman who bowled slow right arm. He scored 175 runs with a highest score of 31 and took four wickets with a best performance of one for 8.
