= William Pirrie (surgeon) =

Scottish surgeon and medical author

Professor William Pirrie FRSE
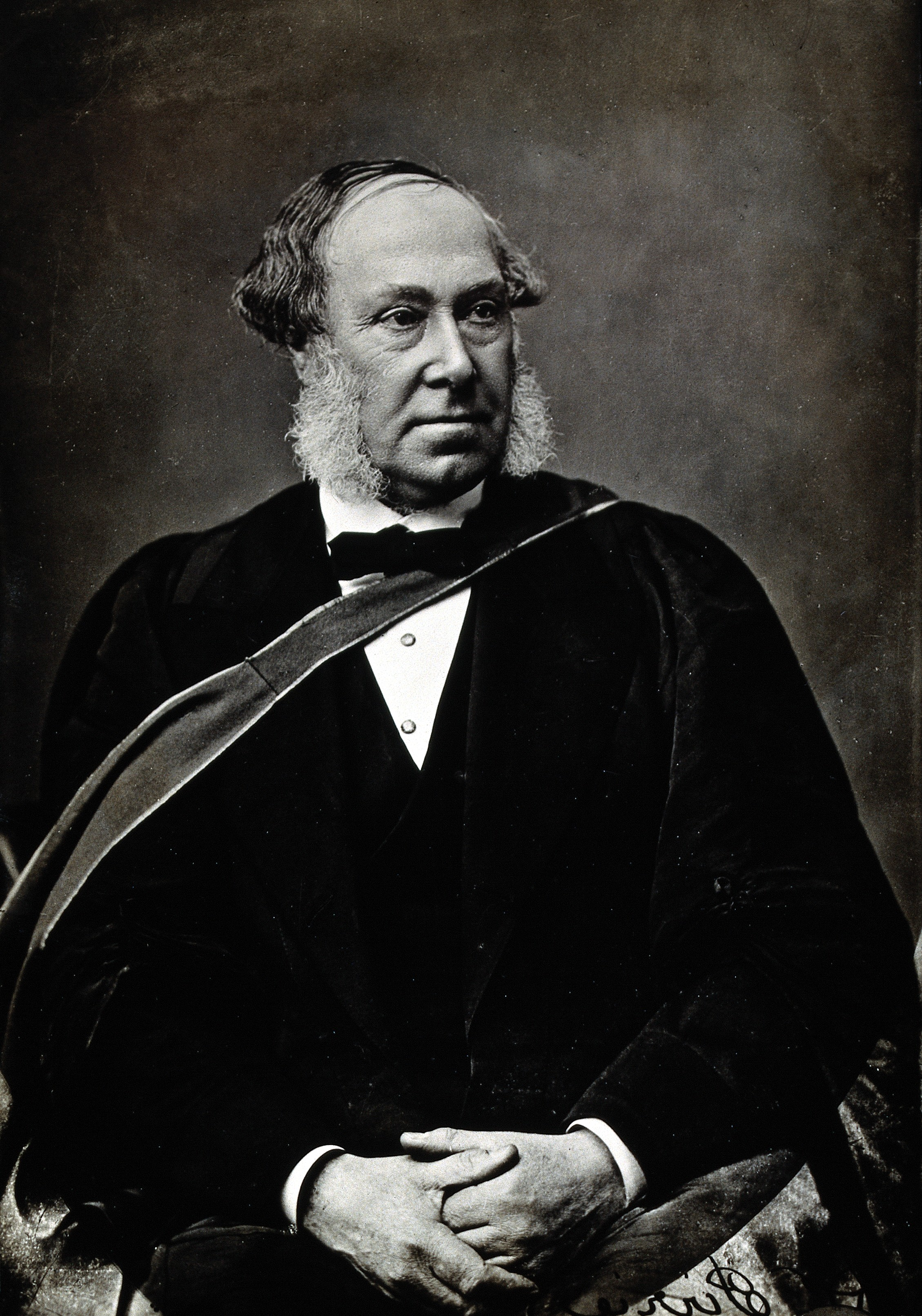
- Born: 1807; Huntly, Aberdeenshire, Scotland
- Died: 21 November 1882 (aged 74–75); Union Street, Aberdeen, Scotland

Academic background
- Education: Marischal College, Aberdeen

Prof William Pirrie FRSE LLD (1807 – 21 November 1882) was a 19th-century Scottish surgeon and medical author. He served as President of the North of Scotland Medical Association.

== Life ==
He was born on a farm near Huntly, Aberdeenshire the son of George Pirrie, a farmer. He was educated at Gartly Parish School then studied medicine at Marischal College in Aberdeen, graduating with an MA in 1825. He did further postgraduate studies in Paris under Baron Dupuytren. He gained his doctorate (MD) in 1829.

In 1830 he began lecturing in anatomy and physiology at the University of Aberdeen. In 1839 he became the first Regius Professor of Surgery at Marischal College.

In 1849 he was elected a Fellow of the Royal Society of Edinburgh. His proposer was James Miller.

In 1860, when Marischal College reunited with the University of Aberdeen, he became Professor of Surgery to Aberdeen, working alongside Prof John Struthers (Professor of Anatomy). also from 1860 he became the head surgeon of Aberdeen Royal Infirmary.

In 1875 the University of Edinburgh awarded him an honorary doctorate (LLD). His students included James Greig Smith.

He retired in June 1882 and died soon after, at 253 Union Street in Aberdeen, on 21 November 1882.

== Family ==
He was father to Alexander Pirrie civil engineer (d.1904) and grandfather to Alexander Mactier Pirrie.

His daughter, Anna Jane, married one of his students, William Heath Strange, who went on to found the Hampstead General Hospital, demolished in the 1970s to make way for the Royal Free Hospital.

== Publications ==
- Principles and Practice of Surgery (1852)
- Acupressure (1867) with Dr William Keith
