= Craig Cleave =

Australian rules footballer

Personal information
- Born: 12 May 1963 (age 63)
- Original team: Leitchville
- Height: 191 cm (6 ft 3 in)
- Weight: 90 kg (198 lb)

Playing career^{1}
| Years | Club | Games (Goals) |
| 1982–1988 | Geelong | 48 (12) |
- ^{1} Playing statistics correct to the end of 1988.

Craig Cleave (born 12 May 1963) is a former Australian rules footballer who played with Geelong in the Victorian Football League (VFL).

Cleave, a key defender, came from Leitchville in northern Victoria. He was centre half-back in Geelong's 1982 reserves premiership team. From 1982 to 1988, Cleave made 48 senior appearances for Geelong. The most he played in a season was 13 games in 1986, which would have been more had he not suffered a dislocated shoulder mid season.
