= Peter Carter (footballer) =

Australian rules footballer

Personal information
- Born: 29 April 1959 (age 67)
- Original team: Brentwood
- Height: 178 cm (5 ft 10 in)
- Weight: 72 kg (159 lb)

Playing career^{1}
Years	Club	Games (Goals)
1977–1980	South Melbourne	10 (2)
1982	Collingwood	1 (1)
Total		11 (3)
- ^{1} Playing statistics correct to the end of 1982.

Peter Carter (born 29 April 1959) is a former Australian rules footballer who played with South Melbourne and Collingwood in the Victorian Football League (VFL).

Carter, a Brentwood recruit, never had a regular run in the South Melbourne team, with his longest season lasting four games in 1979. He joined Collingwood in 1982, but played only once at his new club.
