= Nick Smith (footballer, born 1988) =

Australian rules footballer

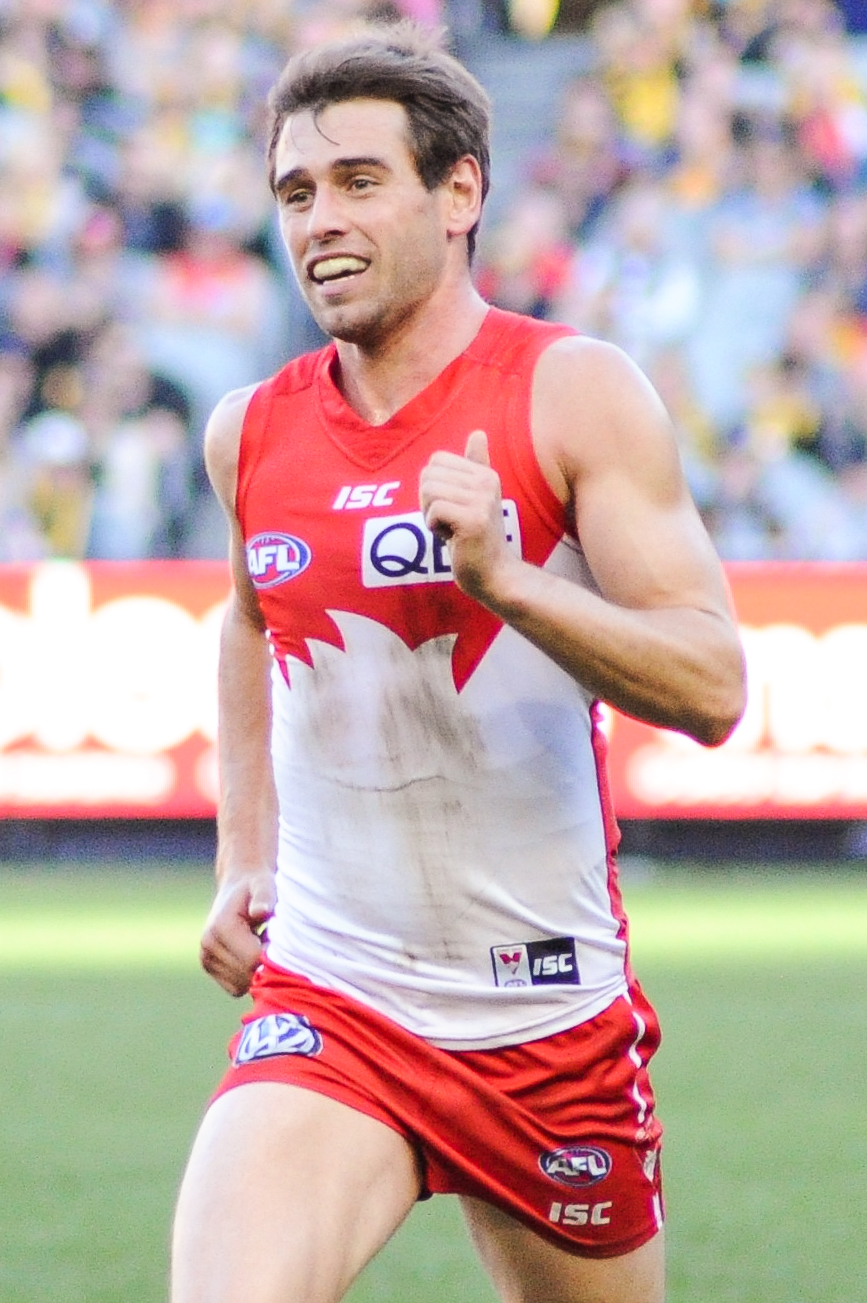
- Smith playing for Sydney in June 2017

Personal information
- Full name: Nicholas Smith
- Nickname: Smooch
- Born: 12 June 1988 (age 38)
- Original team: Oakleigh Chargers (TAC Cup)
- Draft: No. 15, 2007 rookie draft
- Height: 183 cm (6 ft 0 in)
- Weight: 83 kg (183 lb)
- Position: Defender / midfielder

Playing career^{1}
Years	Club	Games (Goals)
2008–2019	Sydney	211 (10)
- ^{1} Playing statistics correct to the end of 2019.

Career highlights
- AFL premiership player (2012); All-Australian (2014)

Nicholas Smith (born 12 June 1988) is a former Australian rules footballer, who played for the Sydney Swans in the Australian Football League (AFL).

== Early football ==
Smith played junior football for the Ashburton United Junior Football Club (Ashy Redbacks) in the Waverley Junior Football Association (WJFA) and was educated at Scotch College, Melbourne (where he captained Cyril Rioli), and then played with the Oakleigh Chargers. He represented Vic Metro in the under-18 national championships before being picked as a rookie in the 2007 Rookie Draft at number 15.

== AFL career ==
He made his AFL senior debut in round 5, 2008 against Geelong after being promoted off the Rookie List earlier in the season. Playing a further senior game against Hawthorn kicking his first senior AFL goal during the match. He was elevated to the Sydney Swans senior list full-time at the end of the 2008. In 2009, he continued to add to his game tally by playing the last 11 matches of the season and was re-signed for a further two years.

In 2010, Smith returned to the senior side playing in the back pocket and as a midfield tagger. He played on some of the best players in the competition and often managed to severely limit their influence. Those players included Luke Hodge, Dan Giansiracusa, Mark Le Cras, Steve Johnson, Stephen Hill, Eddie Betts and Luke Power.

Smith's 2011 season was another consistent showing. He played mostly as a small defender and continued to play on the most dangerous players in the league. His year was rewarded with 6th place in the 2011 Bob Skilton Medal.

Smith was rewarded for his hard work with a spot in the 2014 All Australian team.

His father Mal played one game for St Kilda in 1982.

As of the end of the 2018 AFL season, Smith has played the most AFL games of any player without polling a single Brownlow Medal vote. Smith's 2019 season was beset by injury. Fears that he might not play again were realised when on 14 August 2019, Smith announced his retirement from AFL football.

== Statistics ==
Legend
G	Goals	K	Kicks	D	Disposals	T	Tackles
B	Behinds	H	Handballs	M	Marks
#	Played in that season's premiership team

Season	Team	No.	Games	Totals							Averages (per game)							Votes
Season	Team	No.	Games	G	B	K	H	D	M	T	G	B	K	H	D	M	T	Votes
2008	Sydney	40	2	1	0	11	7	18	4	4	0.5	0.0	5.5	3.5	9.0	2.0	2.0	0
2009	Sydney	40	11	1	1	71	77	148	31	31	0.1	0.1	6.5	7.0	13.5	2.8	2.8	0
2010	Sydney	40	16	4	0	90	102	192	42	38	0.3	0.0	5.6	6.4	12.0	2.6	2.4	0
2011	Sydney	40	23	2	1	189	132	321	76	82	0.1	0.0	8.2	5.7	14.0	3.3	3.6	0
2012^{#}	Sydney	40	22	0	3	162	164	326	67	87	0.0	0.1	7.4	7.5	14.8	3.0	4.0	0
2013	Sydney	40	24	1	1	167	167	334	72	75	0.0	0.0	7.0	7.0	13.9	3.0	3.1	0
2014	Sydney	40	23	0	1	188	169	357	83	59	0.0	0.0	8.2	7.3	15.5	3.6	2.6	0
2015	Sydney	40	21	0	2	202	150	352	110	64	0.0	0.1	9.6	7.1	16.8	5.2	3.0	0
2016	Sydney	40	25	1	1	218	129	347	93	79	0.0	0.0	8.7	5.2	13.9	3.7	3.2	0
2017	Sydney	40	24	0	1	164	138	302	111	44	0.0	0.0	6.8	5.8	12.6	4.6	1.8	0
2018	Sydney	40	20	0	1	135	153	288	90	52	0.0	0.1	6.8	7.7	14.4	4.5	2.6	0
2019	Sydney	40	0	—	—	—	—	—	—	—	—	—	—	—	—	—	—	—
Career			211	10	12	1597	1388	2985	779	615	0.0	0.1	7.6	6.6	14.1	3.7	2.9	0
