= Craig Braddy =

Australian rules footballer

Personal information
- Full name: Craig Braddy
- Born: 12 April 1959 (age 67)
- Original team: Olympic Youth Club
- Height: 192 cm (6 ft 4 in)
- Weight: 91 kg (201 lb)

Playing career^{1}
Years	Club	Games (Goals)
1980–1981	Fitzroy	8 (3)
1982–1985	Sydney Swans	56 (83)
Total		64 (86)
- ^{1} Playing statistics correct to the end of 1985.

Craig Braddy (born 12 April 1959) is a former Australian rules footballer who played with Fitzroy and the Sydney Swans in the Victorian Football League (VFL) during the 1980s.

Braddy could only manage four games in each of his two league seasons at Fitzroy, having come to the club from the Olympic Youth Club.

He was sold to Sydney and played in their first season after relocation from South Melbourne. Braddy and Gerard Neesham were the first new recruits to play for Sydney, making their debuts in round seven of 1982.

In 1983 he had his best season, playing 21 games as a key forward. He kicked 48 goals to comfortably top the Swans goal-kicking and had a career best six goal haul in a game against Carlton on the Sydney Cricket Ground. The following season he played 18 games and equaled his goals record with another six goal effort against North Melbourne.

After his VFL career ended, Braddy played with distinction in the South Australian National Football League (SANFL) with Central District. He also spent a year with Victorian Football Association club Dandenong in 1990. He is now involved in sports management and was the chief executive of the Eastern Football League from 2002 to 2005.

His younger brother, Shane Braddy, was briefly a player with the Melbourne Football Club.
