= Edward Beers =

Edward Beers may refer to:

- Ed Beers (born 1959), Canadian ice hockey player
- Edward M. Beers (1877–1932), American politician
