= Cameron Guthrie =

Australian rules footballer

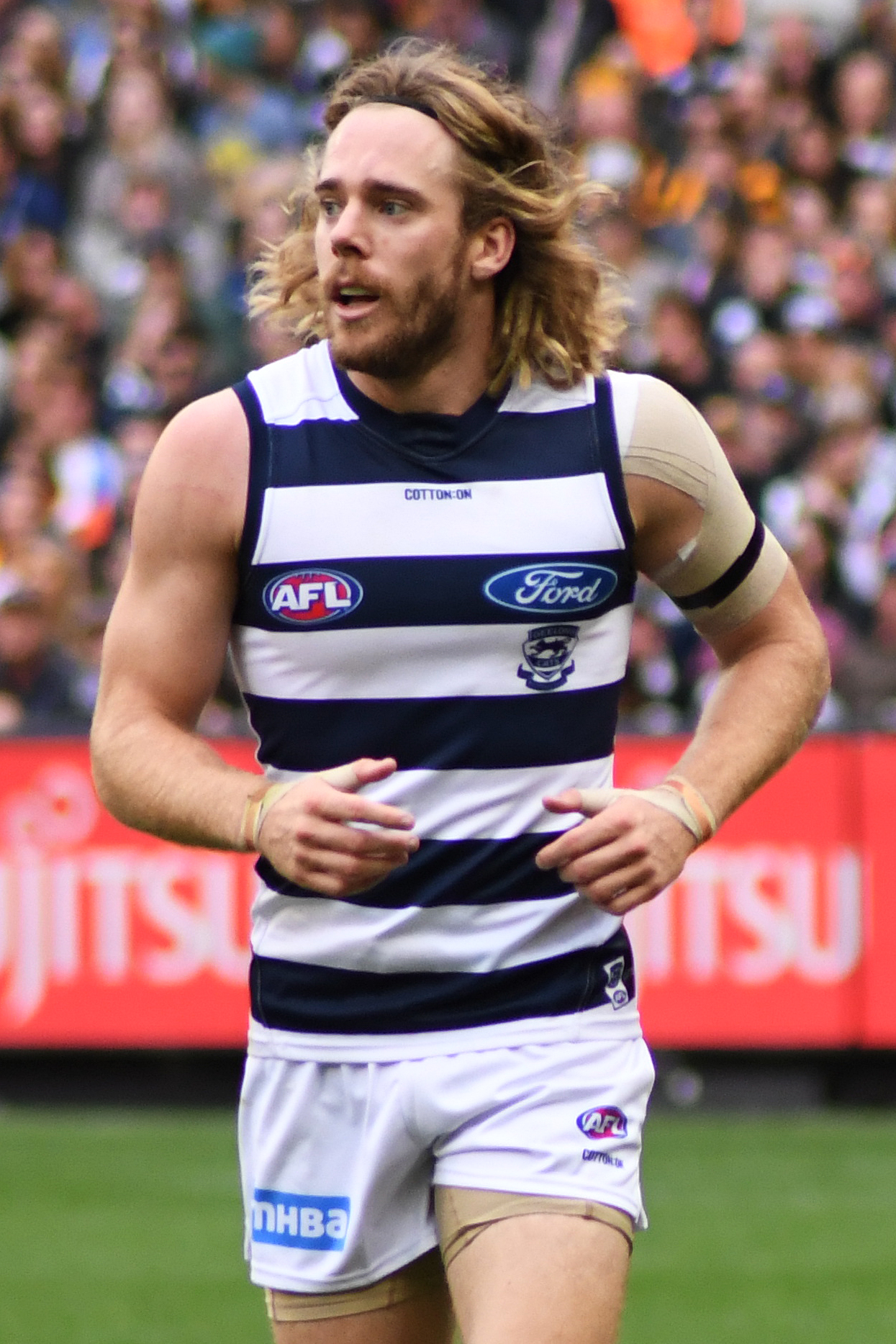
- Guthrie playing for Geelong in April 2019

Personal information
- Born: 19 August 1992 (age 34)
- Original teams: Sunbury (BFL); Calder Cannons (TAC Cup)
- Draft: No. 23, 2010 national draft
- Height: 187 cm (6 ft 2 in)
- Weight: 86 kg (190 lb)
- Position: Midfielder

Club information
- Current club: Geelong
- Number: 29

Playing career
Years	Club	Games (Goals)
2011–2025	Geelong	240 (75)

Career highlights
- AFL Premiership Player (2022); 2× Carji Greeves Medal (2020, 2022); All-Australian (2020); Geelong best young player: 2014

Cameron Guthrie (born 19 August 1992) is a former Australian rules footballer who played for the Geelong Football Club in the Australian Football League (AFL).

== AFL career ==
Guthrie was drafted with the 23rd selection in the 2010 AFL draft after playing for the Calder Cannons in the TAC Cup. He was allocated the No. 29 jumper, previously worn by Gary Ablett, Jr., who had left Geelong to become the new Gold Coast Football Club's inaugural captain.

He made his AFL debut in the opening round of the 2011 AFL season in Geelong's thrilling one-point win over St Kilda.

He went on to play one more game in the 2011 home-and-away season, missing out on the 2011 finals series. He afterwards played 18 of the 23 home-and-away season games with the Geelong Cats, securing his position as a regular for the years to come. He is the son of former Fitzroy and Essendon player, Andrew Guthrie, and the brother of Ben Guthrie, a journalist with afl.com.au.

After the 2016 rookie draft, Guthrie was joined by his youngest brother Zach Guthrie at Geelong.

In 2020, Guthrie had a career-best year and was awarded with his first All-Australian selection, as well as his first Carji Greeves Medal.

2022 was another strong season for Guthrie, becoming a premiership player alongside his brother in the Cats' 81-point thumping of Sydney in the 2022 AFL Grand Final. He also won his second Carji Greeves Medal alongside teammate Jeremy Cameron.

After that premiership, Guthrie struggled with injuries, only playing 10 games over the next three seasons, before being delisted at the end of the 2025 AFL season.

== Statistics ==
Legend
G	Goals	K	Kicks	D	Disposals	T	Tackles
B	Behinds	H	Handballs	M	Marks
#	Played in that season's premiership team

Season	Team	No.	Games	Totals							Averages (per game)							Votes
Season	Team	No.	Games	G	B	K	H	D	M	T	G	B	K	H	D	M	T	Votes
2011	Geelong	29	2	0	0	8	13	21	4	5	0.0	0.0	4.0	6.5	10.5	2.0	2.5	0
2012	Geelong	29	18	1	0	100	97	197	42	44	0.1	0.0	5.6	5.4	10.9	2.3	2.4	0
2013	Geelong	29	20	5	2	143	114	257	75	55	0.3	0.1	7.2	5.7	12.9	3.8	2.8	0
2014	Geelong	29	24	4	7	203	241	444	72	124	0.2	0.3	8.5	10.0	18.5	3.0	5.2	0
2015	Geelong	29	21	13	7	192	261	453	69	110	0.6	0.3	9.1	12.4	21.6	3.3	5.2	6
2016	Geelong	29	23	12	7	226	301	527	75	77	0.5	0.3	9.8	13.1	22.9	3.3	3.3	3
2017	Geelong	29	20	4	5	140	224	364	55	85	0.2	0.3	7.0	11.2	18.2	2.8	4.3	0
2018	Geelong	29	13	3	0	99	113	212	34	39	0.2	0.0	7.6	8.7	16.3	2.6	3.0	0
2019	Geelong	29	20	10	4	191	177	368	70	98	0.5	0.2	9.6	8.9	18.4	3.5	4.9	1
2020 (Note: The 2020 season was played with 17 home-and-away matches per team (down from 22) and 16-minute quarters with time on (down from 20-minute quarters with time on) due to the impact of the COVID-19 pandemic.)	Geelong	29	21	7	2	225	222	447	94	86	0.3	0.1	10.7	10.6	21.3	4.5	4.1	14
2021	Geelong	29	23	4	8	342	325	667	129	92	0.2	0.3	14.9	14.1	29.0	5.6	4.0	18
2022^{#}	Geelong	29	25	12	12	316	297	613	90	124	0.5	0.5	12.6	11.9	24.5	3.6	5.0	13
2023	Geelong	29	6	0	0	77	57	134	25	31	0.0	0.0	12.8	9.5	22.3	4.2	5.2	0
2024	Geelong	29	4	0	0	38	29	67	13	11	0.0	0.0	9.5	7.3	16.8	3.3	2.8	0
2025	Geelong	29	0	—	—	—	—	—	—	—	—	—	—	—	—	—	—	0
Career			240	75	54	2300	2471	4771	847	981	0.3	0.2	9.6	10.3	19.9	3.5	4.1	55

== Honours and achievements ==
Team

- AFL premiership player (Geelong): 2022
- 2× McClelland Trophy (Geelong): 2019, 2022

Individual

- 2× Carji Greeves Medal: 2020, 2022
- All-Australian team: 2020
- Geelong F.C. Best Young Player Award: 2014
