= Gary Walpole =

Australian rules footballer

Personal information
- Full name: Gary Walpole
- Born: 29 October 1963 (age 63)
- Original team: Fish Creek
- Height: 180 cm (5 ft 11 in)
- Weight: 73 kg (161 lb)

Playing career^{1}
Years	Club	Games (Goals)
1982–83	Footscray	12 (5)
- ^{1} Playing statistics correct to the end of 1983.

Gary Walpole (born 29 October 1963) is a former Australian rules footballer who played with Footscray in the Victorian Football League (VFL).
