= William Beers =

William Beers may refer to:

- William George Beers (1843–1900), Canadian dentist referred to as the "father of modern lacrosse"
- William L. Beers (1904–1955), American politician in Connecticut
- William H. Beers (1823-1893), American President of the New-York Life Insurance
