= Bruce West (newspaperman) =

Canadian newspaper journalist and author

Bruce West (5 January 1912 - 16 September 1990) was a Canadian newspaper journalist and author. He was a columnist from the 1930s until the 1970s.

As well as writing a daily column for the Toronto-based national newspaper, The Globe and Mail, he wrote several books, narrated for television and wrote fiction for Maclean's magazine.

== Early life ==
West was born and raised in a log house in Huntsville, Ontario. As a young man he began writing for the local weekly paper. He sent a story by telegraph to all the Toronto papers describing a brawl in the local tavern that sent two brothers to jail where they proceeded to wreck the premises. The Globe, which later merged with The Mail and Empire to become The Globe and Mail, printed it.

West had a number of further stories published in The Globe and frequently travelled by train to Toronto to pitch story ideas. West was hired onto the staff of The Globe in 1934 and he became one of its best known reporters.

== Early career ==
West's first assignment was to cover a beekeepers association meeting at the King Edward Hotel. He became a feature writer and by-lined reporter. One assignment took him to the lumber camps of northern Ontario during the Great Depression. In 1936 he started a regular feature called Aviation where he could write about the relatively new technology of the air, a special interest of his. During the Second World War, West was loaned by The Globe and Mail to the Wartime Information Board where he served in Ottawa and London and, immediately after the war, in Washington.

== Years as a columnist ==
West began writing a daily column for The Globe and Mail in 1948 and it continued for 25 years, occupying the top front page of the second section. He left it only for a year (1956–57) when he was appointed to manage the paper's new promotion department.

His columns were often humorous and contained observations about everyday life. He advocated the maintenance of a British connection during the Canadian flag debate in 1964.

West was also sent on assignment, covering the coronation of Queen Elizabeth, the Cuban revolution in 1959, the Springhill mining disaster of 1958, the 1949 fire on the luxury cruise ship, the SS Noronic, in Toronto Harbour, and several royal visits. He interviewed Orson Welles on behalf of the Globe and Mail after the famous 1938 broadcast of The War of the Worlds.

West travelled several times to the Canadian Arctic, where he wrote front-page feature stories, often accompanied by his own photography. During his career he travelled to over 20 countries in Europe, Africa, South America and the Caribbean as well as coast-to-coast-to-coast in Canada.

West's papers have been archived in a collection at the Thomas Fisher Rare Book Library at the University of Toronto.

== Books ==
- A Change of Pace, University of Toronto Press (1956)
- Toronto, ISBN 0385026250, Doubleday Canada Limited (1967)
- Around Toronto, ASIN B002F4QUO4, Doubleday Canada Limited (1969) (with illustrator John Richmond)
- The Happy Gamble: The History of the Canadian National Sportsmens Show ASIN B002FDAQDQ (1972)
- The Firebirds: How bush flying won its wings, Ministry of Natural Resources, Ontario (1974)
- The Man Who Flew Churchill, ISBN 0070777578, McGraw-Hill Ryerson Limited, Toronto (1975)

== Narration ==
Bruce West wrote and voiced the narration for the following documentaries which aired nationally on CBC-TV:

- Normandy Dream, Artistic Productions Limited (1978)
- Spitfire Pilot, Artistic Productions Limited (1981)
