= Bob Beers =

Bob Beers may refer to:

- Bob Beers (ice hockey) (born 1967), American hockey player and commentator
- Bob Beers (politician, born 1951), former Nevada Assemblyman
- Bob Beers (politician, born 1959), Las Vegas City Councilman and former Nevada State Legislator
- Bob Beers (folk singer) (1920–1972), American musician and founder of the Beers Family folk group
- Robert O. Beers (1916–2005), Pennsylvania politician
