= Lorna Beers =

American novelist, poet, memoirist, and author of children's books

- Born: Lorna Doone Beers; May 10, 1897; Maple Plain, Minnesota
- Died: June 5, 1989 (aged 92)
- Education: University of Minnesota
- Occupations: Novelist; poet; memoirist; author of children's books
- Writing career
- Notable awards: Hopwood Award, 1932, for The Mad Stone

Lorna Doone Beers (May 10, 1897 – June 5, 1989) was an American novelist, poet, memoirist, and author of children's books. The winner of an early Hopwood Award for fiction, Ms. Beers was viewed by editors at E.P. Dutton in New York as a writer with the literary potential and the mastery of Midwestern themes and voices to become another Ole Rolvaag or even Sinclair Lewis. Her novels are praised for their strong characterizations of modern women, their sensitivity to the forces active in a changing America, and their clear-eyed poet's view of life in the northern prairies. Her three major novels were written in the ten-year period between 1922 and 1932.

== Early life and education ==
She was born in Maple Plain, Minnesota, in 1897 to John Beers and Sara James Beers, a farming couple in their forties who had moved into the village and opened a hardware store and lumber yard just three years before Lorna's birth. The youngest of five children (her siblings were Priscilla, Harry, Hilton, and Jessa), she grew up in a hardworking farming community which had been frontier only a few years earlier. Her mother Sara died when Lorna was 13. Beers described herself as going off to college (unusual for a young woman in Minnesota at the time) still wearing her waist-length blonde braids.

With her writing encouraged by her professors, she would graduate from the University of Minnesota and win a teaching assistantship in English there. She would study later at the University of Michigan and George Washington University. She marched for women's suffrage, and in 1920, just before her 23rd birthday, married a young businessman, Clyde Raymond (Ray) Chambers. Their son Richard was born in 1924.

== Career as a writer ==
Beers achieved considerable national acclaim for her novels, all of which were set in the northern plains. While still in her mid-twenties, she attracted the interest of major New York publisher E. P. Dutton, whose editors took pains to debut her as a “literary” writer (as opposed to a writer of romances). When Prairie Fires was published in 1925, Louis Kronenberger writing in the Saturday Review of Literature called it "a modern epic of the soil" and "a spacious novel" with "vitality, variety, a power of making its narrative march...." Respected critic Robert Morss Lovett wrote in The New Republic, “There is something Russian about this book, and there is also something very American about it.” Lovett praised “its truth to essential conditions.” Prairie Fires was lauded in The New Yorker in three separate issues. In 1929, Beers published A Humble Lear, which an Ohio reviewer described “as an amazingly gripping novel of farm life,” and the New York Times Book Review characterized as “absorbing because it is real.”

Published in 1932, The Mad Stone received the Avery Hopwood Award at the University of Michigan. Dutton, her publisher, promoted the book as "an example of the pure American novel" and "a contribution to American literature." Beers did not publish another novel after The Mad Stone. (The same period was similarly productive for another Minnesota-born writer, Sinclair Lewis, who published Main Street, Babbitt, and Elmer Gantry during these years.)

After 1932, and during the decade of the 1940s, Beers attempted no sustained writing efforts as ambitious as novels. Her time and energies were increasingly consumed, she would tell confidants years later, by caring for her husband, who was plagued by emotional problems, including crippling phobias. During this time the couple lived mostly in Summit, New Jersey, within commuting distance of Manhattan where Ray Chambers worked in the investment community. In the 1950s, Beers produced two perennially popular books for young readers that are still being read today, The Book of Hugh Flower (1952) and The Crystal Cornerstone (1955). In 1966, W.W.Norton published Wild Apples and North Wind, her lyrical and haunting memoir of living on a farm in Vermont. This book brought back some of the passion and intensity of her novels, but at a distant, bittersweet remove from the prairie narratives. Its acute, understated descriptions of the intersections between nature and people echo Robert Frost and anticipate Annie Dillard.

== Later years ==
The couple retired to a 150-year-old farmhouse in rural Vermont in the late 1950s. Through the sixties and into the seventies Beers was a frequent contributor of poetry, stories, and short pieces to publications like Harper's, Yankee, The New England Galaxy, The Sign, and the Christian Science Monitor. August Derleth selected one of her poems for Fire and Sleet and Candlelight, an anthology devoted to works on fantasy and the macabre by living poets. By 1966, the couple moved to Staunton, Virginia, in the Shenandoah Valley. Widowed in 1974, Beers lived quietly there with her widowed daughter-in-law, whom she adored, on a shady hill above a lovely women's college campus. The walls of her old house were lined floor to ceiling with thousands of books. She died in 1989 at age 92. Among her papers was a completed first draft of another novel.

== Works ==
- Prairie Fires (1925)
- A Humble Lear (1929)
- The Mad Stone (1932)
- The Book of Hugh Flower (1952)
- The Crystal Cornerstone (1955)
- Wild Apples and North Wind (1966)

== Bibliography ==
- “Social History of the Dakota Prairies in a New Novel, Prairie Fires by Lorna Doone Beers.” New York Times Book Review, May 17, 1925, p. 8.
- “A Lear of the Plains: A Humble Lear by Lorna Doone Beers.” New York Times Book Review, June 2, 1929, p. 5.
- “Books Today.” [Review of Wild Apples and North Wind by Lorna Beers.] The New York Times, April 25, 1966, p. 28.
