= Trevor Mustey =

Australian rules footballer

Personal information
- Full name: Trevor Mustey
- Born: 29 September 1963 (age 63)
- Original team: Clayton (FDF)
- Height: 204 cm (6 ft 8 in)
- Weight: 92 kg (203 lb)
- Position: Ruck

Playing career^{1}
Years	Club	Games (Goals)
1982–83	Sydney	2 (0)
- ^{1} Playing statistics correct to the end of 1983.

Trevor Mustey (born 29 September 1963) is a former Australian rules footballer who played with Sydney in the Victorian Football League (VFL).

A ruckman, Mustey was recruited from Clayton Football Club in the Federal Football League and made his VFL debut in 1982.
