= Terry Beers =

Australian rugby league footballer

Personal information
- Full name: Terence Charles Beers
- Born: 11 January 1925; Kogarah, New South Wales
- Died: 19 March 2015 (Age 90); Kogarah, New South Wales

Playing information
- Position: Centre
Club
| Years | Team | Pld | T | G | FG | P |
|---|---|---|---|---|---|---|
| 1945 | St. George | 4 | 0 | 0 | 0 | 0 |

Terence Charles 'Terry' Beers (1925–2015) was an Australian rugby league footballer who played in the 1940s.

Beers was graded at St. George in 1945 and played great football to be promoted from Third Grade to First Grade in his debut year. Over the next couple of seasons he remained at the club, regularly playing lower grades until 1948 when he retired.

Beers died on 19 March 2015 at Kogarah, New South Wales. He was later cremated at Woronora Crematorium, Sutherland.
