= Brian Beers =

Australian rules footballer

Personal information
- Born: 31 January 1939 (age 87)
- Original team: CBC Parade
- Height: 178 cm (5 ft 10 in)
- Weight: 73 kg (161 lb)

Playing career^{1}
Years	Club	Games (Goals)
1958–1961	Collingwood	60 (72)
1962–1964	Fitzroy	19 (14)
Total		79 (86)
- ^{1} Playing statistics correct to the end of 1964.

Brian Beers (born 31 January 1939) is a former Australian rules footballer who played for Collingwood and Fitzroy in the VFL.

== Family ==
He is the father of Mark Beers and Tony Beers, who both also played for Collingwood.

== Football ==
=== Collingwood (VFL) ===
A half forward, Beers was a member of Collingwood's 1958 premiership team and kicked two goals in the grand final. In 1959 he kicked a career high 28 goals for the year and the following season he played in the Collingwood side which lost the 1960 Grand Final.

=== Fitzroy (VFL) ===
He crossed to Fitzroy in 1962 where he finished his career.

On 6 July 1963, playing on the half-forward flank, he was a member of the young and inexperienced Fitzroy team that comprehensively and unexpectedly defeated Geelong, 9.13 (67) to 3.13 (31) in the 1963 Miracle Match.

== Tennis ==
Beers also played tennis at a competitive level and later became the general manager of Tennis Victoria.

== See also ==
- 1963 Miracle Match
