= Shane Braddy =

Australian rules footballer

Personal information
- Full name: Shane Braddy
- Born: 22 July 1960 (age 66)
- Original team: Olympic Youth Club
- Height: 188 cm (6 ft 2 in)
- Weight: 83.5 kg (184 lb)

Playing career^{1}
Years	Club	Games (Goals)
1981	Melbourne	2 (3)
- ^{1} Playing statistics correct to the end of 1981.

Shane Braddy (born 22 July 1960) is a former Australian rules footballer who played with Melbourne in the Victorian Football League (VFL).

Braddy's brother Craig is a former leading footballer, playing for Fitzroy and Sydney.
