= Richard Pirrie =

Australian rules footballer

Dick Pirrie

Personal information
- Full name: Richard Francis Pirrie
- Born: 15 April 1879; Richmond, Victoria
- Died: 15 September 1962 (aged 83); Hawthorn, Victoria

Playing career^{1}
Years	Club	Games (Goals)
1898–1900	Melbourne	24 (31)
- ^{1} Playing statistics correct to the end of 1800.

Richard Francis Pirrie (15 April 1879 – 15 September 1962) was an Australian rules footballer who played with Melbourne in the Victorian Football League (VFL).

== Family ==
The son of James Pirrie (1832-1898), and Mary Pirrie (1844-1931), née Murphy, Richard Francis Pirrie was born in Richmond, Victoria on 15 April 1879.

He married Isobel Agatha McGuire (1897-1982) on 16 July 1919.

Two of his sons, Dick Pirrie and Kevin Pirrie, played for Hawthorn; and his grandson, Stephen Pirrie, Kevin's son, played for Richmond.

== Football ==
=== Melbourne (VFL) ===
He played 24 games, and kicked 11 goals for Melbourne in the VFL, over three seasons (1898 to 1900).

=== Richmond (VFA) ===
Cleared from Melbourne to Richmond in the Victorian Football Association (VFA) in 1901, he played 23 games for Richmond, and scored 11 goals, over to seasons (1901 and 1902).

== Death ==
He died at his home in Hawthorn, Victoria on 15 September 1962.

== See also ==
- List of Australian rules football families
