= Darren Brown (footballer) =

Australian rules footballer (born 1965)

Personal information
- Full name: Darren James Brown
- Born: 8 May 1965
- Died: 18 June 2026 (aged 61)
- Original team: North Footscray
- Height: 180 cm (5 ft 11 in)
- Weight: 72 kg (159 lb)

Playing career^{1}
Years	Club	Games (Goals)
1982	Footscray	1 (0)
- ^{1} Playing statistics correct to the end of 1982.

Darren James Brown (8 May 1965 – 18 June 2026) was an Australian rules footballer who played with Footscray in the Victorian Football League (VFL).
