= Adrian Battiston =

Australian rules footballer

Personal information
- Full name: Adrian Battiston
- Born: 16 September 1963 (age 63)
- Original team: Tatura (GVFL)
- Height: 175 cm (5 ft 9 in)
- Weight: 79 kg (174 lb)

Playing career^{1}
Years	Club	Games (Goals)
1982–1987	Melbourne	96 (75)
1988–1989	Sydney Swans	9 (3)
Total		105 (78)
- ^{1} Playing statistics correct to the end of 1989.

Adrian Battiston (born 16 September 1963) is a former Australian rules footballer who played with Melbourne and the Sydney Swans in the Victorian Football League (VFL).

Battiston, who came to Melbourne from Goulburn Valley League club Tatura, won the Morrish Medal in 1981 for his performances in the VFL Under 19 competition. This earned him a promotion to the seniors in 1982 and he played in all 22 league games that year, winning Melbourne's "Best First Year Player" award. He was the leading disposal getter for Melbourne in the 1985 VFL season.

His two seasons at Sydney were spent mostly in the reserves, and in 1990 he moved to his third state, South Australia, to play for Glenelg in the South Australian National Football League (SANFL). He made 23 appearances for the club and would later act as their general manager. Battiston was the List Manager for the West Coast Eagles, and is now part of the R&D Sports Management Group.
