= Dick Pirrie =

Australian rules footballer

Personal information
- Full name: Richard Michael Pirrie
- Born: 6 June 1920; Hawthorn, Victoria
- Died: 6 June 1944 (aged 24); English Channel, off Juno Beach, Normandy, German-occupied France
- Original team: Hawthorn CYMS (CYMSFA)
- Height: 175 cm (5 ft 9 in)
- Weight: 74 kg (163 lb)

Playing career^{1}
Years	Club	Games (Goals)
1940–41	Hawthorn	3 (0)
- ^{1} Playing statistics correct to the end of 1941.

Richard Michael Pirrie (6 June 1920 – 6 June 1944) was an Australian rules footballer who played with Hawthorn in the Victorian Football League (VFL).

== Family ==
The son of Richard Francis Pirrie (1879–1962), and Isobel Agatha Pirrie (1897–1982), née McGuire, Richard Michael Pirrie was born in Hawthorn on 6 June 1920.

== Education ==
He attended St Patrick's College, East Melbourne.

== Football ==
His father, also known as "Dick" Pirrie, and his brother, Kevin Pirrie also played for Hawthorn.

His nephew, Kevin's son Stephen Pirrie, played with Richmond, St Kilda and Essendon in the Victorian Football League (VFL), and with Port Melbourne in the VFA.

== War service ==
Following the outbreak of World War II, Pirrie enlisted in the Royal Australian Navy (RAN), on 8 September 1941 and was given the service number PM/V77.

Acting Sub-Lieutenant Perrie was posted to Britain, for training in amphibious landings. He was assigned initially to Royal Navy shore establishment, HMS Quebec, which was a part of the British Combined Operations Training Centre, on the banks of Loch Fyne, Scotland.

By mid-1944, Pirrie had been posted to a shore establishment on the River Hamble, Hampshire, HMS Cricket, where a component of the expeditionary force for the Allied invasion of North West Europe was being assembled.

On D-Day (6 June), he was attached to the crew of a British LSI HMS Invicta, which landed part of the 7th Canadian Infantry Brigade at "Juno Beach", near Courseulles-sur-Mer. Pirrie was killed when Invicta received a direct hit from a German shore battery. He was the first member of the RAN to be killed in action on D-Day. He was mentioned in dispatches (MiD): "For gallantry, skill and determination and undaunted devotion to duty during the initial landing of Allied Forces on the coast of Normandy".

== See also ==
- List of Victorian Football League players who died on active service
- List of Australian rules football families
