= Bruce West (footballer) =

Australian rules footballer

Personal information
- Full name: Bruce West
- Born: 15 November 1962 (age 63)
- Original team: Deer Park
- Height: 183 cm (6 ft 0 in)
- Weight: 79 kg (174 lb)

Playing career^{1}
Years	Club	Games (Goals)
1982	Footscray	1 (0)
- ^{1} Playing statistics correct to the end of 1982.

Bruce West (born 15 November 1962) is a former Australian rules footballer who played with Footscray in the Victorian Football League (VFL).
