= Andy Preston (footballer) =

Australian rules footballer

Personal information
- Full name: Andy Preston
- Born: 16 August 1957 (age 69)
- Original team: Scotch College
- Height: 180 cm (5 ft 11 in)
- Weight: 77 kg (170 lb)

Playing career^{1}
Years	Club	Games (Goals)
1977–1981	Geelong	58 (13)
1982–1983	Richmond	18 (6)
1986	Footscray	2 (0)
Total		78 (19)
- ^{1} Playing statistics correct to the end of 1986.

Andy Preston (born 16 August 1957) is a former Australian rules footballer who played with Geelong, Richmond and Footscray in the Victorian Football League (VFL).

Preston, from Scotch College, was a utility who made his league debut as a 19-year-old in 1977. He played for most of the second half of the 1977 season and added another 15 games in 1978 when he averaged 14 disposals. In 1979 he missed just three games and polled well in the Brownlow Medal count with seven votes, the second best for Geelong. He spent most of the 1980 and 1981 seasons in the reserves and in both of those years was on the wing when they won the reserves grand final.

He moved to Richmond in 1982 in search of greater opportunities but had to wait until round 12 to play his first game, although he then played every match for the rest of the year. A utility, he played in Richmond's semi final win over Carlton that year but wasn't selected in the Grand Final, having pulled his hamstring. After just six appearances in 1983, Preston left the VFL, but returned in 1986 to play two games with Footscray.
