= David T. Beers =

Financial analyst

- Education: University of Virginia; London School of Economics
- Occupation: financial analyst

David T. Beers is a financial analyst and until December 2011 was head of sovereign credit ratings for credit rating agency Standard & Poor's (S&P). In August 2011, Beers earned significant attention as the S&P executive responsible for downgrading the credit rating of United States Treasury bonds to AA+. Prior to this, the United States had maintained a AAA credit rating since 1941. He lives in London. In January 2012, Beers announced his appointment, effective February 1, as Special Adviser to the Governor of the Bank of Canada.

== Education and career ==
Beers received a B.A. degree in international relations from the University of Virginia and an M.Sc. degree in economics from the London School of Economics (LSE). He has since set up a scholarship at LSE in his name. Beers joined S&P in 1990 focused on rating sovereign debt of over 100 countries. Prior to that, Beers had been an economist at Salomon Brothers focused on analyzing the creditworthiness of sovereign debt. He also worked at Bankers Trust Company, evaluating the risks of lending to Asia-Pacific countries.

== Media perception ==
Although relatively unknown to the general public, Beers is one of the most influential people in the world: the Guardian newspaper wrote in August 2011 that, "In recent weeks, we have witnessed elected leaders in the world's most powerful nation dancing to the tune of David Beers. He's the mustachioed, chain-smoking head of sovereign credit ratings for S&P, the largest and arguably most influential member of the big three." Reuters, meanwhile, said: "You may have never heard of David Beers but every finance minister in the world knows of him". The Independent has said of Beers that he "might be the most powerful man in the world that you've never heard of."
