= Zach Guthrie =

Australian rules footballer (born 1998)

Personal information
- Full name: Zach Guthrie
- Born: 30 June 1998 (age 28)
- Original team: Calder Cannons (TAC Cup)
- Draft: No. 33, 2017 rookie draft
- Debut: Round 15, 2017, Geelong vs. Greater Western Sydney, at Spotless Stadium
- Height: 186 cm (6 ft 1 in)
- Weight: 74 kg (163 lb)
- Position: Defender

Club information
- Current club: Geelong
- Number: 39

Playing career^{1}
Years	Club	Games (Goals)
2017–	Geelong	153 (16)
- ^{1} Playing statistics correct to the end of 2026.

Career highlights
- AFL premiership player: 2022

Zach Guthrie (born 30 June 1998) is a professional Australian rules footballer playing for the Geelong Football Club in the Australian Football League (AFL). He was drafted by Geelong with their second selection and thirty-third overall in the 2017 rookie draft. He made his debut in the draw against Greater Western Sydney at Spotless Stadium in round fifteen of the 2017 season and is the younger brother of Cats midfielder Cameron Guthrie.

Guthrie currently studies a Bachelor of Exercise Sport Science at Deakin University.

== Statistics ==
Updated to the end of round 22, 2026.

Legend
G	Goals	K	Kicks	D	Disposals	T	Tackles
B	Behinds	H	Handballs	M	Marks
#	Played in that season's premiership team

Season	Team	No.	Games	Totals							Averages (per game)							Votes
Season	Team	No.	Games	G	B	K	H	D	M	T	G	B	K	H	D	M	T	Votes
2017	Geelong	39	9	0	1	39	57	96	28	19	0.0	0.1	4.3	6.3	10.7	3.1	2.1	0
2018	Geelong	39	7	0	0	50	32	82	25	11	0.0	0.0	7.1	4.6	11.7	3.6	1.6	0
2019	Geelong	39	1	0	0	11	2	13	5	1	0.0	0.0	11.0	2.0	13.0	5.0	1.0	0
2020 (Note: The 2020 season was played with 17 home-and-away matches per team (down from 22) and 16-minute quarters with time on (down from 20-minute quarters with time on) due to the impact of the COVID-19 pandemic.)	Geelong	39	3	2	0	22	10	32	7	2	0.7	0.0	7.3	3.3	10.7	2.3	0.7	0
2021	Geelong	39	13	0	1	120	40	160	51	32	0.0	0.1	9.2	3.1	12.3	3.9	2.5	0
2022^{#}	Geelong	39	21	5	3	224	97	321	116	48	0.2	0.1	10.7	4.6	15.3	5.5	2.3	0
2023	Geelong	39	23	3	2	251	120	371	128	59	0.1	0.1	10.9	5.2	16.1	5.6	2.6	0
2024	Geelong	39	25	4	2	335	121	456	150	59	0.2	0.1	13.4	4.8	18.2	6.0	2.4	4
2025	Geelong	39	26	1	2	325	129	454	169	54	0.0	0.1	12.5	5.0	17.5	6.5	2.1	1
2026	Geelong	39	21	1	1	212	120	332	108	55	0.0	0.0	10.1	5.7	15.8	5.1	2.6	0
Career			149	16	12	1589	728	2317	787	340	0.1	0.1	10.7	4.9	15.6	5.3	2.3	5

== Honours and achievements ==
Team

- AFL premiership player (Geelong): 2022
- 2× McClelland Trophy (Geelong): 2019, 2022
