= Tom McLean (footballer, born 1931) =

Australian rules footballer

Personal information
- Full name: Thomas Hugh McLean
- Born: 30 November 1931
- Died: 25 March 2017 (aged 85)
- Original team: South Yarra
- Height: 191 cm (6 ft 3 in)
- Weight: 89.5 kg (197 lb)

Playing career^{1}
Years	Club	Games (Goals)
1951–52	Melbourne	22 (2)
1954–56	North Melbourne	9 (1)
1957–61	Sandringham	
Total		31 (3)
- ^{1} Playing statistics correct to the end of 1956.

Thomas Hugh McLean (30 November 1931 – 25 March 2017) was an Australian rules footballer who played with Melbourne and North Melbourne in the Victorian Football League (VFL). North cleared him to Sandringham before the 1957 season, and he remained there until 1961 and was captain of the club.
