= Kevin Pirrie =

Australian rules footballer

Personal information
- Full name: Kevin James Pirrie
- Born: 16 February 1922; Hawthorn, Victoria
- Died: 9 January 2006 (aged 83); Kew, Victoria
- Original team: Hawthorn CYMS (CYMSFA)
- Height: 183 cm (6 ft 0 in)
- Weight: 81 kg (179 lb)

Playing career^{1}
| Years | Club | Games (Goals) |
| 1941, 1946 | Hawthorn | 10 (0) |
- ^{1} Playing statistics correct to the end of 1946.

Kevin James Pirrie (16 February 1922 – 9 January 2006) was an Australian rules footballer who played with Hawthorn in the Victorian Football League (VFL).

== Family ==
He was the son of Richard Pirrie and brother of Dick Pirrie.

== War service ==
Pirrie's football career was interrupted by his service in the Australian Army during World War II.
