= Mark Beers (footballer) =

Australian rules footballer

Personal information
- Full name: Mark Edward Beers
- Born: 15 August 1965 (age 61)
- Debut: 31 March 1984, Collingwood vs. Melbourne, at Victoria Park
- Height: 180 cm (5 ft 11 in)
- Weight: 78 kg (172 lb)

Playing career^{1}
Years	Club	Games (Goals)
1984–1987	Collingwood	40 (23)
- ^{1} Playing statistics correct to the end of 1987.

Career highlights
- Collingwood reserves best and fairest 1987

Mark Edward Beers (born 15 August 1965) is a former Australian rules footballer who played with Collingwood in the Victorian Football League (VFL).

In his first two seasons he played 31 senior games. In his next and final two seasons, Beers only played 9 senior games. However, he contributed at the reserves level, winning the team's best and fairest jointly with Paul Rizonico in 1987.

After leaving Collingwood and the VFL, Beers joined Kyabram in the Goulburn Valley Football League (GVFL), becoming the team captain, and afterwards, the senior coach.

In 2006, Beers was appointed as assistant and reserves coach for the Victorian Amateur Football Association (VAFA) team Old Scotch.

His father Brian Beers was a member of Collingwood's 1958 premiership team.
