= 1982 VFL season =

86th season of the Victorian Football League (VFL)

1982 VFL premiership season
- Teams: 12
- Premiers: Carlton; 14th premiership
- Minor premiers: Richmond; 8th minor premiership
- Night series: Swans; 1st Night series win
- Brownlow Medallist: Brian Wilson; Melbourne (23 votes)
- Coleman Medallist: Malcolm Blight; North Melbourne (94 goals)

Attendance
- Matches played: 138
- Total attendance: 3,681,556 (26,678 per match)
- Highest: 107,536

The 1982 VFL season was the 86th season of the Victorian Football League (VFL), the highest level senior Australian rules football competition in Victoria. The season featured twelve clubs, ran from 20 March until 25 September, and comprised a 22-game home-and-away season followed by a finals series featuring the top five clubs.

The season saw the VFL establish its first permanent interstate presence, as the South Melbourne Football Club (which was known after June just as the Swans, being renamed Sydney the following year) played all of its home games on Sunday afternoons in Sydney, New South Wales.

The premiership was won by the Carlton Football Club for the 14th time and second time consecutively, after it defeated Richmond by 18 points in the VFL grand final.

== Night series ==
The Swans defeated North Melbourne 13.12 (90) to 8.10 (58) in the final.

== Home-and-away season ==
=== Round 1 ===
	Round 1
Saturday, 27 March (2:10 pm)	Carlton 16.17 (113)	drew with	Fitzroy 17.11 (113)	Princes Park (crowd: 26,669)
Saturday, 27 March (2:10 pm)	Collingwood 7.16 (58)	def. by	Geelong 21.20 (146)	VFL Park (crowd: 53,549)
Saturday, 27 March (2:10 pm)	Essendon 29.16 (190)	def.	Footscray 11.15 (81)	Windy Hill (crowd: 26,456)
Saturday, 27 March (2:10 pm)	St Kilda 12.16 (88)	def. by	Hawthorn 17.17 (119)	Moorabbin Oval (crowd: 19,719)
Saturday, 27 March (2:10 pm)	Richmond 18.14 (122)	def.	North Melbourne 15.14 (104)	MCG (crowd: 38,864)
Sunday, 28 March (2:10 pm)	Swans 20.17 (137)	def.	Melbourne 16.12 (108)	SCG (crowd: 15,764)

=== Round 2 ===
	Round 2
Saturday, 20 March (2:10 pm)	Fitzroy 13.11 (89)	def. by	Richmond 20.10 (130)	VFL Park (crowd: 38,686)	Report
Saturday, 3 April (2:10 pm)	Carlton 8.17 (65)	def. by	Essendon 13.13 (91)	VFL Park (crowd: 60,208)	Report
Saturday, 3 April (2:10 pm)	Footscray 14.8 (92)	def. by	Collingwood 15.14 (104)	Western Oval (crowd: 27,266)	Report
Saturday, 3 April (2:10 pm)	Hawthorn 13.19 (97)	def.	Geelong 11.12 (78)	Princes Park (crowd: 15,600)	Report
Saturday, 3 April (2:10 pm)	Melbourne 20.26 (146)	def.	St Kilda 16.10 (106)	MCG (crowd: 25,467)	Report
Saturday, 3 April (2:10 pm)	North Melbourne 24.13 (157)	def.	Swans 16.21 (117)	Arden Street Oval (crowd: 14,097)	Report

=== Round 3 ===
	Round 3
Saturday, 10 April (2:10 pm)	Collingwood 13.16 (94)	def. by	Carlton 20.8 (128)	Victoria Park (crowd: 34,055)	Report
Saturday, 10 April (2:10 pm)	Fitzroy 14.16 (100)	def. by	North Melbourne 25.14 (164)	Junction Oval (crowd: 21,888)	Report
Saturday, 10 April (2:10 pm)	St Kilda 17.14 (116)	def. by	Swans 20.22 (142)	Moorabbin Oval (crowd: 17,811)	Report
Monday, 12 April (2:10 pm)	Richmond 25.22 (172)	def.	Essendon 16.14 (110)	MCG (crowd: 90,564)	Report
Monday, 12 April (2:10 pm)	Hawthorn 28.26 (194)	def.	Footscray 7.9 (51)	VFL Park (crowd: 22,209)	Report
Monday, 12 April (2:10 pm)	Geelong 21.12 (138)	def.	Melbourne 5.16 (46)	Kardinia Park (crowd: 24,672)	Report

=== Round 4 ===
	Round 4
Saturday, 17 April (2:10 pm)	Carlton 21.22 (148)	def.	Hawthorn 12.15 (87)	Princes Park (crowd: 29,654)	Report
Saturday, 17 April (2:10 pm)	Richmond 15.17 (107)	def.	Collingwood 10.15 (75)	VFL Park (crowd: 59,472)	Report
Saturday, 17 April (2:10 pm)	Essendon 12.19 (91)	def. by	North Melbourne 14.24 (108)	Windy Hill (crowd: 27,190)	Report
Saturday, 17 April (2:10 pm)	Melbourne 19.12 (126)	def. by	Footscray 19.19 (133)	MCG (crowd: 19,832)	Report
Saturday, 17 April (2:10 pm)	St Kilda 16.9 (105)	def.	Geelong 13.14 (92)	Moorabbin Oval (crowd: 17,148)	Report
Sunday, 18 April (2:10 pm)	Swans 24.18 (162)	def.	Fitzroy 14.22 (106)	SCG (crowd: 13,617)	Report

=== Round 5 ===
Home team	Home team score	Away team	Away team score	Venue	Crowd	Date
Hawthorn	13.22 (100)	Richmond	10.22 (82)	Princes Park	20,110	24 April 1982
Geelong	12.12 (84)	Swans	11.16 (82)	Kardinia Park	20,770	24 April 1982
Footscray	15.20 (110)	St Kilda	20.9 (129)	Western Oval	18,526	24 April 1982
Fitzroy	18.19 (127)	Essendon	15.12 (102)	Junction Oval	18,268	24 April 1982
North Melbourne	19.22 (136)	Collingwood	18.11 (119)	Arden Street Oval	23,405	24 April 1982
Melbourne	9.12 (66)	Carlton	9.22 (76)	VFL Park	26,950	24 April 1982

=== Round 6 ===
Home team	Home team score	Away team	Away team score	Venue	Crowd	Date
Collingwood	13.10 (88)	Fitzroy	12.19 (91)	Victoria Park	27,052	1 May 1982
Richmond	18.8 (116)	Melbourne	15.16 (106)	MCG	31,438	1 May 1982
Geelong	17.20 (122)	Footscray	7.22 (64)	Kardinia Park	18,791	1 May 1982
St Kilda	11.14 (80)	Carlton	16.22 (118)	Moorabbin Oval	26,185	1 May 1982
North Melbourne	15.11 (101)	Hawthorn	19.21 (135)	VFL Park	34,921	1 May 1982
Swans	15.21 (111)	Essendon	18.9 (117)	SCG	15,461	2 May 1982

=== Round 7 ===
Home team	Home team score	Away team	Away team score	Venue	Crowd	Date
Melbourne	22.11 (143)	North Melbourne	28.12 (180)	MCG	25,704	8 May 1982
Footscray	15.20 (110)	Swans	20.11 (131)	Western Oval	11,487	8 May 1982
Fitzroy	19.15 (129)	Hawthorn	17.15 (117)	Junction Oval	14,675	8 May 1982
Carlton	15.20 (110)	Geelong	7.7 (49)	Princes Park	28,736	8 May 1982
Essendon	17.20 (122)	Collingwood	9.13 (67)	Windy Hill	25,510	8 May 1982
St Kilda	17.12 (114)	Richmond	21.14 (140)	VFL Park	33,222	8 May 1982

=== Round 8 ===
Home team	Home team score	Away team	Away team score	Venue	Crowd	Date
North Melbourne	23.18 (156)	St Kilda	6.16 (52)	Arden Street Oval	16,258	15 May 1982
Geelong	12.15 (87)	Richmond	11.23 (89)	Kardinia Park	28,403	15 May 1982
Hawthorn	15.15 (105)	Essendon	16.15 (111)	Princes Park	26,865	15 May 1982
Footscray	11.11 (77)	Carlton	14.22 (106)	Western Oval	17,903	15 May 1982
Fitzroy	13.21 (99)	Melbourne	25.14 (164)	VFL Park	25,856	15 May 1982
Swans	15.25 (115)	Collingwood	13.19 (97)	SCG	20,905	16 May 1982

=== Round 9 ===
Home team	Home team score	Away team	Away team score	Venue	Crowd	Date
Essendon	19.19 (133)	Melbourne	12.13 (85)	Windy Hill	22,403	22 May 1982
Collingwood	13.14 (92)	Hawthorn	17.12 (114)	Victoria Park	24,904	22 May 1982
Carlton	27.23 (185)	Swans	12.11 (83)	Princes Park	23,954	22 May 1982
Richmond	21.13 (139)	Footscray	14.14 (98)	MCG	22,493	22 May 1982
St Kilda	16.19 (115)	Fitzroy	25.12 (162)	Moorabbin Oval	15,140	22 May 1982
Geelong	15.19 (109)	North Melbourne	9.9 (63)	VFL Park	25,237	22 May 1982

=== Round 10 ===
	Round 10
Saturday, 29 May (2:10 pm)	Carlton 18.16 (124)	def.	Richmond 16.11 (107)	Princes Park (crowd: 35,372)	Report
Saturday, 29 May (2:10 pm)	Melbourne 16.24 (120)	def.	Collingwood 17.11 (113)	MCG (crowd: 52,169)	Report
Saturday, 29 May (2:10 pm)	Essendon 22.17 (149)	def.	St Kilda 18.11 (119)	VFL Park (crowd: 36,736)	Report
Saturday, 29 May (2:10 pm)	Fitzroy 25.11 (161)	def.	Geelong 19.18 (132)	Junction Oval (crowd: 16,256)	Report
Saturday, 29 May (2:10 pm)	Footscray 15.10 (100)	def. by	North Melbourne 23.20 (158)	Western Oval (crowd: 15,686)	Report
Sunday, 30 May (2:10 pm)	Swans 15.13 (103)	def. by	Hawthorn 24.13 (157)	SCG (crowd: 15,420)	Report
On the Thursday following Footscray's 58-point loss to North Melbourne, their ninth defeat in ten games, Royce Hart was dismissed as senior coach and demoted to the position of assistant coach. Reserve team coach and Hart's predecessor Don McKenzie returned to stand in as caretaker until a new coach was appointed.

=== Round 11 ===
Home team	Home team score	Away team	Away team score	Venue	Crowd	Date
Richmond	20.14 (134)	Swans	18.25 (133)	MCG	28,216	5 June 1982
Hawthorn	26.22 (178)	Melbourne	14.15 (99)	Princes Park	14,087	5 June 1982
Collingwood	26.16 (172)	St Kilda	21.10 (136)	Victoria Park	26,657	5 June 1982
Geelong	10.11 (71)	Essendon	17.9 (111)	Kardinia Park	29,884	5 June 1982
North Melbourne	13.18 (96)	Carlton	15.15 (105)	Arden Street Oval	26,206	5 June 1982
Footscray	16.12 (108)	Fitzroy	23.22 (160)	VFL Park	13,908	5 June 1982

=== Round 12 ===
Home team	Home team score	Away team	Away team score	Venue	Crowd	Date
Richmond	23.18 (156)	Fitzroy	17.16 (118)	MCG	43,474	12 June 1982
St Kilda	14.11 (95)	Melbourne	19.24 (138)	Moorabbin Oval	19,385	12 June 1982
Swans	15.15 (105)	North Melbourne	16.15 (111)	SCG	14,523	13 June 1982
Geelong	6.17 (53)	Hawthorn	17.10 (112)	VFL Park	38,086	14 June 1982
Collingwood	24.19 (163)	Footscray	14.13 (97)	Victoria Park	29,075	14 June 1982
Essendon	19.12 (126)	Carlton	8.18 (66)	Windy Hill	33,800	14 June 1982

=== Round 13 ===
Home team	Home team score	Away team	Away team score	Venue	Crowd	Date
Footscray	16.11 (107)	Hawthorn	12.20 (92)	Western Oval	10,530	19 June 1982
Carlton	12.26 (98)	Collingwood	9.17 (71)	Princes Park	30,346	19 June 1982
Melbourne	21.8 (134)	Geelong	10.10 (70)	MCG	23,365	19 June 1982
North Melbourne	13.10 (88)	Fitzroy	11.21 (87)	Arden Street Oval	16,000	19 June 1982
Essendon	10.5 (65)	Richmond	12.10 (82)	VFL Park	64,319	19 June 1982
Swans	30.19 (199)	St Kilda	15.13 (103)	SCG	10,034	20 June 1982

=== Round 14 ===
Home team	Home team score	Away team	Away team score	Venue	Crowd	Date
Geelong	17.8 (110)	St Kilda	10.3 (63)	Kardinia Park	15,107	26 June 1982
Fitzroy	16.16 (112)	Swans	20.13 (133)	Junction Oval	12,300	26 June 1982
Collingwood	10.12 (72)	Richmond	13.16 (94)	Victoria Park	25,409	26 June 1982
Hawthorn	17.14 (116)	Carlton	12.10 (82)	Princes Park	23,354	26 June 1982
Footscray	14.8 (92)	Melbourne	13.16 (94)	VFL Park	18,947	26 June 1982
North Melbourne	14.13 (97)	Essendon	15.15 (105)	MCG	47,656	26 June 1982

=== Round 15 ===
Home team	Home team score	Away team	Away team score	Venue	Crowd	Date
Essendon	21.13 (139)	Fitzroy	7.12 (54)	Windy Hill	20,059	3 July 1982
Carlton	18.20 (128)	Melbourne	16.15 (111)	Princes Park	21,871	3 July 1982
Richmond	17.14 (116)	Hawthorn	22.14 (146)	MCG	48,338	3 July 1982
St Kilda	20.11 (131)	Footscray	18.12 (120)	Moorabbin Oval	15,958	3 July 1982
Collingwood	13.11 (89)	North Melbourne	16.13 (109)	VFL Park	32,812	3 July 1982
Swans	18.18 (126)	Geelong	12.15 (87)	SCG	12,221	4 July 1982

=== Round 16 ===
Home team	Home team score	Away team	Away team score	Venue	Crowd	Date
Hawthorn	32.14 (206)	North Melbourne	15.22 (112)	Princes Park	18,760	10 July 1982
Footscray	25.7 (157)	Geelong	17.13 (115)	Western Oval	14,004	10 July 1982
Carlton	21.13 (139)	St Kilda	9.9 (63)	VFL Park	27,829	10 July 1982
Melbourne	9.18 (72)	Richmond	23.9 (147)	MCG	36,161	17 July 1982
Essendon	12.10 (82)	Swans	17.13 (115)	Windy Hill	22,278	17 July 1982
Fitzroy	10.24 (84)	Collingwood	9.10 (64)	VFL Park	26,105	17 July 1982

=== Round 17 ===
Home team	Home team score	Away team	Away team score	Venue	Crowd	Date
Richmond	28.17 (185)	St Kilda	14.18 (102)	MCG	22,749	24 July 1982
Collingwood	15.18 (108)	Essendon	17.17 (119)	Victoria Park	24,487	24 July 1982
North Melbourne	22.14 (146)	Melbourne	16.17 (113)	Arden Street Oval	10,887	24 July 1982
Geelong	16.19 (115)	Carlton	11.9 (75)	Kardinia Park	19,892	24 July 1982
Hawthorn	18.15 (123)	Fitzroy	27.8 (170)	VFL Park	24,760	24 July 1982
Swans	14.27 (111)	Footscray	15.8 (98)	SCG	11,289	25 July 1982

=== Round 18 ===
Home team	Home team score	Away team	Away team score	Venue	Crowd	Date
Essendon	12.10 (82)	Hawthorn	15.10 (100)	Windy Hill	22,991	31 July 1982
Collingwood	12.13 (85)	Swans	13.12 (90)	Victoria Park	20,636	31 July 1982
Carlton	30.21 (201)	Footscray	10.12 (72)	Princes Park	17,514	31 July 1982
St Kilda	14.12 (96)	North Melbourne	22.18 (150)	Moorabbin Oval	10,955	31 July 1982
Melbourne	13.15 (93)	Fitzroy	24.19 (163)	MCG	18,649	31 July 1982
Richmond	24.19 (163)	Geelong	11.13 (79)	VFL Park	23,237	31 July 1982

=== Round 19 ===
Home team	Home team score	Away team	Away team score	Venue	Crowd	Date
Footscray	7.8 (50)	Richmond	16.16 (112)	Western Oval	16,259	7 August 1982
Fitzroy	21.16 (142)	St Kilda	11.12 (78)	Junction Oval	9,987	7 August 1982
North Melbourne	22.18 (150)	Geelong	11.16 (82)	Arden Street Oval	11,634	7 August 1982
Hawthorn	20.20 (140)	Collingwood	16.22 (118)	Princes Park	18,699	7 August 1982
Melbourne	14.17 (101)	Essendon	20.17 (137)	VFL Park	28,379	7 August 1982
Swans	15.16 (106)	Carlton	9.18 (72)	SCG	25,601	8 August 1982

=== Round 20 ===
Home team	Home team score	Away team	Away team score	Venue	Crowd	Date
Hawthorn	18.18 (126)	Swans	8.14 (62)	Princes Park	15,743	14 August 1982
Collingwood	17.12 (114)	Melbourne	25.18 (168)	Victoria Park	20,702	14 August 1982
Geelong	5.18 (48)	Fitzroy	15.15 (105)	Kardinia Park	14,597	14 August 1982
St Kilda	10.16 (76)	Essendon	13.12 (90)	Moorabbin Oval	15,705	14 August 1982
Richmond	9.10 (64)	Carlton	13.14 (92)	MCG	71,203	14 August 1982
North Melbourne	17.16 (118)	Footscray	16.8 (104)	VFL Park	11,133	14 August 1982

=== Round 21 ===
Home team	Home team score	Away team	Away team score	Venue	Crowd	Date
Fitzroy	19.17 (131)	Footscray	12.11 (83)	Junction Oval	8,280	21 August 1982
Essendon	14.12 (96)	Geelong	12.13 (85)	Windy Hill	17,587	21 August 1982
Carlton	26.24 (180)	North Melbourne	17.8 (110)	Princes Park	28,309	21 August 1982
Melbourne	14.8 (92)	Hawthorn	14.19 (103)	MCG	26,049	21 August 1982
St Kilda	22.16 (148)	Collingwood	16.16 (112)	VFL Park	25,816	21 August 1982
Swans	16.14 (110)	Richmond	19.13 (127)	SCG	21,083	22 August 1982

=== Round 22 ===
Home team	Home team score	Away team	Away team score	Venue	Crowd	Date
North Melbourne	11.13 (79)	Richmond	15.8 (98)	Arden Street Oval	19,135	28 August 1982
Melbourne	25.13 (163)	Swans	22.16 (148)	MCG	27,521	28 August 1982
Hawthorn	23.23 (161)	St Kilda	11.7 (73)	Princes Park	13,116	28 August 1982
Footscray	9.8 (62)	Essendon	32.16 (208)	Western Oval	21,575	28 August 1982
Geelong	18.13 (121)	Collingwood	18.18 (126)	Kardinia Park	20,950	28 August 1982
Fitzroy	17.9 (111)	Carlton	23.12 (150)	VFL Park	46,130	28 August 1982

== Ladder ==
(P)	Premiers
	Qualified for finals

#	Team	P	W	L	D	PF	PA	%	Pts
1	Richmond	22	18	4	0	2682	2125	126.2	72
2	Hawthorn	22	17	5	0	2828	2149	131.6	68
3	Carlton (P)	22	16	5	1	2561	2008	127.5	66
4	Essendon	22	16	6	0	2576	2057	125.2	64
5	North Melbourne	22	14	8	0	2693	2458	109.6	56
6	Fitzroy	22	12	9	1	2614	2550	102.5	50
7	Swans	22	12	10	0	2621	2537	103.3	48
8	Melbourne	22	8	14	0	2488	2752	90.4	32
9	Geelong	22	7	15	0	2073	2293	90.4	28
10	Collingwood	22	4	18	0	2201	2575	85.5	16
11	St Kilda	22	4	18	0	2188	3052	71.7	16
12	Footscray	22	3	19	0	2066	3035	68.1	12

Rules for classification: 1. premiership points; 2. percentage; 3. points for
Average score: 112.1
Source: AFL Tables

== Finals series ==
=== Finals week 1 ===
	Qualifying final
Saturday, 4 September (2:30 pm)	Hawthorn 16.9 (105)	def. by	Carlton 25.13 (163)	MCG (crowd: 70,552)	Report

	Elimination final
Saturday, 4 September (2:30 pm)	Essendon 16.19 (115)	def. by	North Melbourne 19.14 (128)	VFL Park (crowd: 50,537)	Report

=== Finals week 2 ===
	Semi-finals
SF1: Saturday, 11 September (2:30 pm)	Hawthorn 24.22 (166)	def.	North Melbourne 18.6 (114)	MCG (crowd: 61,729)	Report
SF2: Saturday, 11 September (2:30 pm)	Richmond 16.17 (113)	def.	Carlton 13.12 (90)	VFL Park (crowd: 65,611)	Report

=== Preliminary final ===
	Preliminary final
Saturday, 18 September (2:30 pm)	Carlton 13.16 (94)	def.	Hawthorn 8.15 (63)	VFL Park (crowd: 61,307)	Report

=== Grand final ===
	Grand final
Saturday, 25 September (2:50 pm)	Richmond 12.13 (85)	def. by	Carlton 14.19 (103)	MCG (crowd: 107,536)

== Season notes ==
- South Melbourne, affected by limited finances and loss of its inner-city support base ever since World War II, relocated to Sydney after experimental matches played by the VFL there since 1979. Early in the season, the team was still formally known as South Melbourne, although it marketed itself as 'Sydney Swans' in Sydney; on 2 June, the team formally became known as 'the Swans' for the remainder of the season, before formally becoming the 'Sydney Swans' in 1983.
- The VFL's new headquarters at 120 Jolimont Road, Jolimont was officially opened by the recently appointed Victorian Governor Sir Brian Murray at a special dinner on 17 March in the function room of the building. The dinner, which was attended by over 120 invited guests, also served as the launch of the VFL season.
- Looking to build on the previous season's successful first outing for premiership points at The Gabba, the VFL had hoped that the Round 7 match between St Kilda and Richmond, originally scheduled at VFL Park, could be relocated to Brisbane without needing a replacement match played at Waverley. However, League officials were unable to get approval from the clubs to remove the stipulation that required a replacement game at VFL Park if a premiership game was to be played at The Gabba. Essendon, who had played in the previous season's historic first game at the Gabba for premiership points, had been approached about transferring their home game against Collingwood from Windy Hill to Waverley, but refused. Football fans in Brisbane would have to wait until 1991 for the next League game played at the Gabba for premiership points.
- Round 3 - the split Easter round - set a number of VFL records on and off the field; the total gate takings for the round was regarded as the highest on record at the time, officially reported as $486,652, paid by 213,199 people.
- From 4 May, patrons were banned from bringing alcoholic beverages into VFL matches, and were limited to purchasing at most two pre-opened cans at a time from vendors at the ground.
- Owing to the extreme drought and consequent firm grounds, the 1982 season remains the highest-scoring on record. Among the records were:
  - an average game score of 112 points; the next highest average score in a season was 106 points in 1979 and 1983
  - St Kilda and Footscray became the only teams ever to concede 3,000 points in one season
  - 66 scores of 20 goals occurred, a record equalled only in 1991
  - 57 matches where both teams scored more than 100 points - no other season had more than fifty such matches
  - Round 10 is the only round in VFL/AFL history in which every team scored 100 or more points.
- In Round 16 against North Melbourne, Hawthorn set record scores of 13.3 (81) for the first quarter and 20.7 (127) for the first half. The former record stood until 2011, and the latter stood until 2004.
- After a negative response from the players since its introduction in 1980, the VFL abandoned the practice of presenting runners-up medals to the losing team as part of the grand final post-match presentation.
- In Round 18, Leigh Matthews ran into and broke a behind post at Windy Hill.
- Early in the season, the VFL arranged for the grand finalists to play a rematch as a demonstration sport at the 1982 Commonwealth Games, held in Brisbane shortly after the season was finished. Carlton and Richmond played the exhibition match at the Gabba on Wednesday, 6 October, and Richmond won the high-scoring match 28.16 (184) to 26.10 (166).

== Awards ==
- The Coleman Medal was won by Malcolm Blight from North Melbourne.
- The Brownlow Medal was awarded to Brian Wilson from Melbourne.
- The inaugural VFL Players Association Most Valuable Player Award was won by Leigh Matthews. In 2002, the award was renamed the Leigh Matthews Trophy in his honour.
- The reserves premiership was won by Geelong for the third consecutive season. Geelong 19.18 (132) defeated St Kilda 12.11 (83) in the grand final, held as a curtain-raiser to the seniors Grand Final on 25 September.

== Sources ==
- 1982 VFL season at AFL Tables
- 1982 VFL season at Australian Football
