= List of Australian rules football families =

This is a list of Australian rules football families, that is families who have had more than one member play or coach in the Australian Football League (previously the VFL) as well as families who have had multiple immediate family members with notable playing or coaching careers in the West Australian Football League (WAFL), South Australian National Football League (SANFL) or Victorian Football League (VFL, formerly known as the VFA). Each family will have at least a father and child combination or a set of siblings. Many families have had two or more cousins play league football but they are not included unless one also had a father, child or sibling play.

Families with members playing or coaching in the AFL Women's competition, which launched in 2017, are also included.

== A ==
=== Abbey, Grunden, Jonsson, Hill ===
- Angus Abbey (Footscray)
  - Son: Ross Abbey (Footscray)
    - Len Jonsson (Footscray)
  - Alf Jonsson (Footscray)
- Charles Grunden (Footscray)
  - Stanley Grunden (Footscray)
    - Tony Hill (Footscray)
  - Richard Hill (Geelong)

Angus Abbey is Ross Abbey's father, and through marriage, Len Jonsson is Angus’ father-in-law. Alf Jonsson, is Len's older brother, and Charles is Len and Alf's uncle, and Stanley Grunden is Charles's son.

=== Abbott ===
- Clarence Abbott (Collingwood, Carlton, Richmond, Melbourne, South Melbourne)
- Les Abbott (Collingwood, Melbourne)

Clarrie and Les were brothers.

=== Abernethy ===
- Bob Abernethy (Melbourne)
- Jim Abernethy (Melbourne)

Bob and Jim were brothers.

=== Ablett ===
- Len Ablett (Richmond)
  - Cousin once removed: Geoff Ablett (Hawthorn,Richmond/St Kilda)
  - Cousin once removed: Kevin Ablett (Hawthorn,Richmond/Geelong)
    - Son: Luke Ablett (Sydney)
  - Cousin once removed: Gary Ablett Sr. (Hawthorn/Geelong)
    - Son: Gary Ablett Jr. (Geelong,Gold Coast)
    - Son: Nathan Ablett (Geelong,Gold Coast)

Gary is the brother of Geoff and Kevin and father of Gary Jr. and Nathan, Kevin is Luke's father. Len Ablett is the cousin of Gary Ablett's father. Gary Junior and Nathan are cousins of Shane Tuck (Hawthorn rookie list 2000, Richmond 2004–2009) and Travis Tuck (Hawthorn 2007–2009), who are the sons of the league's former games record holder, Michael Tuck. Two further members of the family, Michael and Ryan, were both rookie listed at AFL clubs and have competed in the VFL.

=== Abley ===
- John Abley (Port Adelaide)
- Kevin Abley (Glenelg)

John and Kevin were brothers.

=== Adamson ===
- Jack Adamson (South Melbourne)
- Dave Adamson (South Melbourne)

Jack was the elder brother of Dave.

=== Ah Chee ===
- Brendon Ah Chee (Port Adelaide, West Coast)
- Callum Ah Chee (Gold Coast,Brisbane Lions)

Brendon is the elder brother of Callum.

=== Ahmat ===
- Matthew Ahmat (Brisbane Lions, Sydney)
- Robert Ahmat (Collingwood, Sydney)

Matthew and Robert are brothers.

=== Aish ===
- Peter Aish (Norwood)
  - Michael Aish (Norwood)
  - Andrew Aish (Norwood)
    - Son: James Aish (Brisbane Lions, Collingwood, Fremantle)

Peter was Andrew and Michael's father. Andrew is James's father.

=== Aitchison ===
- Ern Aitchison (Hawthorn)
- Jack Aitchison (Hawthorn)

Ern and Jack were brothers.

=== Aked/Edwards/O'Bree ===
- Frank Aked Sr. (Footscray, Hawthorn)
  - Son: Frank Aked Jr. (Footscray)
  - Son-in-law: Arthur Edwards (Footscray)
    - Son: Allan Edwards (Richmond, Collingwood, Footscray)
      - Son: Jake Edwards (Carlton)
      - Nephew: Shane O'Bree (Brisbane Lions, Collingwood)

Arthur is the father of Allan, who is the father of Jake and the uncle of Shane. Arthur married the daughter of Frank Aked Sr. Frank Sr. is Frank Jr.'s father. Arthur Edwards married Frank Jr.'s sister, making Frank Sr. the grandfather of Allan Edwards and the great-grandfather of Jake Edwards and Shane O'Bree.

=== Albiston ===
- Harold Albiston (Collingwood, Hawthorn)
  - Son: David Albiston (Hawthorn)
- Alec Albiston (Hawthorn, North Melbourne)
- Ken Albiston (Richmond, Melbourne)

Alec, Harold and Ken were brothers. Harold is the father of David.

=== Allan (1) ===
- Graeme Allan (Fitzroy, Collingwood)
  - Son: Marcus Allan (Brisbane Lions)

Graeme is the father of Marcus.

=== Allan (2) ===
- Ron Allan (North Melbourne)
  - Son: Barry Allan (North Melbourne)

Ron is Barry's father.

=== Allan (3) ===
- Keith Allan (Central District)
  - Daughter: Jessica Allan (Adelaide)
  - Daughter: Sarah Allan (Adelaide)

Keith is the father of Sarah and Jessica.

=== Allan (4) ===
- Ben Allan
  - Son:Ed Allan

Ben is the father of Ed.

=== Allen ===
- George Allen (South Melbourne)
- Tommy Allen (South Melbourne)

George and Tommy were brothers.

=== Allison ===
- Tom Allison (North Melbourne)
  - Son: Brett Allison (North Melbourne, Sydney)

Tom is Brett's father.

=== Alves ===
- Mark Alves (Melbourne)
- Stan Alves (Melbourne, North Melbourne)

Mark and Stan are brothers.

=== Anderson (1) ===
- Syd Anderson Sr. (Port Melbourne)
  - Syd Anderson (Melbourne)
  - Claude Anderson (South Melbourne)
    - Son: Graeme R. Anderson (Collingwood)
    - Son: Syd Anderson (South Melbourne)

Syd Sr. (played for Port Melbourne in the VFA) was the father of Syd (born 1918) and Claude, who was the father of Graeme and Syd (born 1949).

=== Anderson (2) ===
- Frank Anderson (Carlton)
  - Son: Graeme F. Anderson (Carlton)

Frank was the father of Graeme.

=== Anderson (3) ===
- Jed Anderson (Hawthorn, North Melbourne)
- J'Noemi Anderson (St Kilda)
- Joe Anderson (Carlton)

J'Noemi is the sister of Jed and Joe.

=== Anderson (4) ===
- Bernie Anderson (Richmond)
- Noel Anderson (North Melbourne, Richmond)

Bernie and Noel were brothers.

=== Anderson/Brown ===
- Doug Anderson (Fitzroy)
  - Grandson: Fraser Brown (Carlton)

Doug Anderson was the grandfather of Fraser Brown.

=== Angus ===
- George Angus (Collingwood)
  - Son: Les Angus (Collingwood)
    - Son: Geoff Angus (Hawthorn)

George was the father of Les. Les was the father of Geoff.

=== Angwin ===
- Andy Angwin (Hawthorn)
  - Grandson: Laurence Angwin (Carlton)

Andy was the grandfather of Laurence.

=== Annand ===
- Bud Annand (St Kilda)
- Stuart Annand (St Kilda)

Bud is the father of Stuart.

=== Antonio ===
- Ebony Antonio
- Kara Antonio

Ebony and Kara are married.

=== Archer ===
- Glenn Archer
  - Jackson Archer

Glenn is the father of Jackson.

=== Armstrong ===
- Bert Armstrong (Essendon)
- Lou Armstrong (Essendon)

Lou was the elder brother of Bert.

=== Arthur ===
- Harold Arthur (North Melbourne)
- Alan Arthur (Essendon)
  - Son: Graham Arthur (Hawthorn)

Alan is the father of Graham and brother of Harold.

=== Ashcroft ===
- Marcus Ashcroft
  - Will Ashcroft
  - Levi Ashcroft

Marcus is the father of Will and Levi.

=== Atkins (1) ===
- Ernie Atkins (University)
  - Son: Jack Atkins (Melbourne)

Ernie is the father of Jack.

=== Atkins (2) ===
- Paul Atkins (Sydney)
- Simon Atkins (Footscray, Fitzroy)

Paul and Simon are twins.

=== Atkinson (1) ===
- Art Atkinson (Melbourne)
- Bill Atkinson (Melbourne)

Art and Bill were brothers.

=== Atkinson (2) ===
- Bob Atkinson (Carlton)
- Ted Atkinson (North Melbourne)
  - Son: John Atkinson (Fitzroy)

Bob and Ted were brothers. John is Ted's son.

=== Atley ===
- Shaun Atley (North Melbourne)
- Joe Atley (Port Adelaide)

Shaun is the elder brother of Joe.

=== Aubrey ===
- Bob Aubrey (St Kilda)
  - Son: Graeme Aubrey (Melbourne)

Bob is the father of Graeme.

=== Austen ===
- Bob Austen (Hawthorn)
- Col Austen (Hawthorn, Richmond)
- Cecil Austen (Hawthorn)
  - Son: Geoff Austen (Fitzroy, Collingwood)

Cecil is the brother of Bob and Col, and the father of Geoff.

== B ==
=== Baggott ===
- Jack Baggott (Richmond, Essendon)
- Ron Baggott (Melbourne)

Jack and Ron were brothers.

=== Bagshaw ===
- Hartley Bagshaw (Sturt)
  - John Bagshaw (Sturt)
  - Paul Bagshaw (Sturt)
    - Guy Bagshaw (Sturt)

Hartley was John and Paul's father. Guy is Paul's son and Hartley's grandson.

=== Bailes ===
- Barclay Bailes (Perth, Fitzroy)
- Ernie Bailes (Collingwood)

Barclay and Ernie were brothers.

=== Bairstow ===
- Mark Bairstow (South Fremantle, Geelong)
  - Son: Toby Bairstow (South Fremantle)
  - Son: Dylan Bairstow (South Fremantle)

Mark is the father of Toby and Dylan, who have all played for South Fremantle.

=== Baker ===
- Reg Baker (Collingwood, Richmond)
- Selwyn Baker (Collingwood, North Melbourne)
- Ted Baker (Carlton, Collingwood, Footscray, Geelong)

Reg, Selwyn and Ted were brothers

=== Ball ===
- Ray Ball (Richmond, South Melbourne)
  - Son: Luke Ball (Collingwood, St Kilda)
  - Son: Matthew Ball (Hawthorn)

Luke and Matthew are the sons of Ray and the grandsons of Felix Russo.

=== Ballard ===
- Alexandra Ballard (Port Adelaide)
- Charlie Ballard (Gold Coast)

Alexandra is Charlie's sister.

=== Balme ===
- Craig Balme (Richmond, Norwood)
- Neil Balme (Subiaco, Richmond, Norwood)

Craig and Neil are brothers.

=== Banfield ===
- Drew Banfield (West Coast, Subiaco)
  - Bailey Banfield (Claremont)
  - Charlie Banfield (St Kilda, West Coast)
  - Harper Banfield (West Coast)
- Matilda Banfield (Fremantle, Peel Thunder)

Drew is the father of Bailey, Charlie and Harper. Matilda is his niece.

=== Banks ===
- Albert Banks (South Fremantle, Perth)
- Tom Banks (Fitzroy)

Albert and Tom were brothers

=== Bant ===
- Chris Bant (St Kilda, Geelong)
- Horrie Bant (West Perth, St Kilda, Essendon, Subiaco)

Chris and Horrie were brothers.

=== Barassi ===
- Ron Barassi Sr. (Melbourne)
  - Son: Ron Barassi (Melbourne, Carlton)

Ron Barassi is the son of Ron Barassi Senior.

=== Barham ===
- Billy Barham (Melbourne)
- Jamie Barham (Melbourne, Footscray)
- Ricky Barham (Collingwood)
  - Son: Jaxson Barham (Collingwood)

Billy, Jamie and Ricky are brothers. Ricky is the father of Jaxson.

=== Barker (1) ===
- George Barker (Essendon)
- Syd Barker Sr. (Richmond, Essendon, North Melbourne)
  - Son: Syd Barker Jr. (North Melbourne)

Syd Senior was the brother of George and the father of Syd Junior.

=== Barker (2) ===
- George Barker (Hawthorn)
- Jack Barker (Hawthorn)

George and Jack were brothers.

=== Barlow ===
- Kris Barlow (Hawthorn)
- Paul Barlow (Richmond, West Adelaide)

Kris and Paul are brothers.

=== Barnes (1) ===
- Bert Barnes (Richmond)
  - Son: Reg Barnes (Hawthorn)

Bert was the father of Reg.

=== Barnes (2) ===
- Jack Barnes (South Melbourne)
  - Son: Ken Barnes (South Melbourne)

Jack was the father of Ken.

=== Barrot ===
- Bill Barrot (Richmond, St Kilda, Carlton, West Torrens)
- Wes Barrot (Richmond, Collingwood)

Bill and Wes were brothers.

=== Barton ===
- Bill Barton (North Melbourne)
- Colin Barton (Geelong)
- George Barton (Hawthorn)

Bill, Colin and George were brothers.

=== Bassett ===
- Nathan Bassett (Adelaide)
- Scott Bassett (Norwood, Port Adelaide, Western Bulldogs)

Nathan is the elder brother of Scott.

=== Batchelor ===
- Vin Batchelor (Collingwood)
  - Son: Keith Batchelor (Collingwood, North Melbourne)

Vin was the father of Keith.

=== Batty ===
- Ern Batty (Geelong)
- Les Batty (Geelong, Carlton)

Ern and Les were brothers.

=== Baxter (1) ===
- Ben Baxter (Essendon)
  - Son: Ray Baxter (Richmond)

Ben was the father of Ray.

=== Baxter (2) ===
- Ray Baxter (Footscray)
  - Son: Darren Baxter (Footscray, Hawthorn)

Ray is the father of Darren.

=== Baxter (3) ===
- Bernie Baxter (Carlton)
- Bill Baxter (Melbourne)
- Ken Baxter (Carlton)

Bernie, Bill and Ken were brothers.

=== Bayes ===
- Gavin Bayes (Richmond)
- Mark Bayes (Sydney)

Gavin and Mark are brothers.

=== Beams ===
- Claye Beams (Brisbane Lions)
- Dayne Beams (Collingwood, Brisbane Lions)

Claye and Dayne are brothers.

=== Beard ===
- Bert Beard (Fitzroy, South Fremantle, South Melbourne)
- Neville Beard (Perth)

Bert was the father of Neville.

=== Beasy ===
- Maurie Beasy (Carlton)
  - Son: Doug Beasy (Carlton)
      - Grandson: Brendan Whitecross (Hawthorn)

Maurie was the father of Doug, and the great-grandfather of Brendan.

=== Beckwith ===
- Wally Beckwith (Fitzroy, umpire)
  - Son: John Beckwith (Melbourne)

Wally was the father of John.

=== Bedford ===
- Bill Bedford (Fitzroy)
  - Son: Peter Bedford (South Melbourne, Carlton)

Bill was the father of Peter.

=== Beers ===
- Brian Beers (Collingwood, Fitzroy)
  - Son: Mark Beers (Collingwood)
  - Son: Tony Beers (Collingwood, Claremont)

Brian is the father of Mark and Tony.

=== Belcher ===
- Allan Belcher (Collingwood, Essendon)
- Vic Belcher (South Melbourne)

Alan and Vic were brothers.

=== Bell ===
- Dennis Bell (Collingwood)
- John Bell (Collingwood)

Dennis and John were brothers.

=== Bendle ===
- Alby Bendle (Geelong)
- Bill Bendle (Geelong)

Alby and Bill were brothers.

=== Bentley ===
- Percy Bentley (Richmond)
  - Bruce Bentley (Carlton)

Percy was the father of Bruce.

=== Berry ===
- Jarrod Berry (Brisbane Lions)
- Tom Berry (Brisbane Lions, Gold Coast)

Jarrod and Thomas are brothers.

=== Besanko ===
- Barry Besanko (Essendon)
- Neil Besanko (St Kilda, Essendon)

Barry and Neil are brothers.

=== Beveridge ===
- Jack Beveridge (Collingwood, West Perth)
  - Grandson: Luke Beveridge (Melbourne, Footscray, St Kilda)

Jack was the grandfather of Luke.

=== Bewick ===
- Darren Bewick (Essendon, West Perth)
- Corey Bewick (West Perth)
  - Son: Rohan Bewick (Brisbane Lions, West Perth)
  - Son: Shaun Bewick (South Fremantle, West Perth)

Darren and Corey are brothers, Rohan and Shaun are Corey's identical twin sons. All have played for West Perth in the WAFL, Darren and Rohan have played in the AFL.

=== Bews ===
- Andrew Bews (Geelong, Brisbane Bears, Brisbane Lions)
  - Son Jed Bews (Geelong)

Jed is the son of Andrew

=== Bickford ===
- Albert Bickford (Carlton, Melbourne)
- Edric Bickford (Essendon, Carlton)
  - Son: George Bickford (Melbourne)
    - Son: Stephen Bickford (Melbourne)
- Brother-in-law: Rod McGregor (Carlton)

Albert and Edric were brothers. Rod was married to their sister. Edric was the father of George, who is the father of Stephen.

=== Blackwell ===
- Wayne Blackwell (Carlton, Claremont)
  - Son: Luke Blackwell (Swan Districts, Carlton, Claremont)

Wayne is the father of Luke.

=== Blake (1) ===
- Rod Blake (Geelong)
  - Mark Blake (Geelong)

Rod is the father of Mark.

=== Blake (2) ===
- George Blake (St Kilda, Carlton)
- Mick Blake (St Kilda)
- Tom Blake (Carlton, St Kilda)

Tom, George and Mick were all brothers.

=== Blakey ===
- John Blakey
  - Nick Blakey

John is the father of Nick.

=== Board ===
- Terry J. Board (Carlton)
  - Terry M. Board (Fitzroy)

Terry J. is the father of Terry M.

=== Boland ===
- Brian Boland (Richmond, Hawthorn)
  - Glenn Boland (Melbourne, St Kilda)

Brian was the father of Glenn.

=== Bolton ===
- Darren Bolton (Fremantle)
  - Son: Shai Bolton (Richmond)

Darren is the father of Shai.

=== Bond ===
- Shane Bond (West Coast, Port Adelaide)
- Troy Bond (Port Adelaide, Carlton, Adelaide)

Shane and Troy are brothers.

=== Bootsma ===
- Brad Bootsma (South Fremantle, Fremantle)
  - Son: Josh Bootsma (Carlton)

Brad is the father of Josh.

=== Borlase ===
- Darryl Borlase
- James Borlase

Darryl is the father of James.

=== Bosustow ===
- Bob Bosustow (Carlton)
  - Son: Peter Bosustow (Perth, Carlton)
    - Son: Brent Bosustow (South Fremantle)

Bob is the father of Peter and Peter is the father of Brent.

=== Bourke (1) ===
- Tim Bourke (Geelong)
- Damian Bourke (Geelong, Brisbane Bears)
  - Son: Jordon Bourke (Brisbane Lions)

Damian and Tim are brothers and Damian is the father of Jordon.

=== Bourke (2) ===
- Frank Bourke (Richmond)
  - Francis Bourke (Richmond)
    - David Bourke (Richmond, North Melbourne)

Frank was the father of Francis and Francis is the father of David.

=== Bourke (3) ===
- Barry Bourke (Melbourne)
  - Darren Bourke (St Kilda)

Barry is the father of Darren.

=== Bowden ===
- Michael Bowden (Richmond)
  - Joel Bowden (Richmond)
  - Patrick Bowden (Western Bulldogs, Richmond)
  - Sean Bowden (Richmond)

Michael was the father of Patrick, Sean and Joel.

=== Bower ===
- Brendan Bower (Richmond, Essendon, North Melbourne)
- Darren Bower (Richmond)
- Nathan Bower (Richmond)

Brendan is the elder brother of Darren and Nathan.

=== Bowey ===
- Belinda Bowey
- Brett Bowey
- Jake Bowey

Brett is Belinda's brother and Jake's father.

=== Boyd ===
- Dave Boyd
- Greg Boyd
- Russell Boyd

Dave was the father of Greg and Russell.

=== Boyle ===
- Stephen Boyle (Footscray)
  - Tim Boyle (Hawthorn)

Stephen is the father of Tim.

=== Braddy ===
- Craig Braddy (Fitzroy, Sydney)
- Shane Braddy (Melbourne)

Craig is the elder brother of Shane.

=== Bradley ===
- Rupe Bradley (Carlton, Fitzroy)
- Syd Bradley (St Kilda)

Rupe and Syd were brothers.

=== Bradshaw ===
- Daniel Bradshaw (Brisbane Bears, Brisbane Lions, Sydney)
- Darren Bradshaw (Brisbane Lions)

Daniel is the elder brother of Darren.

=== Brady ===
- Campbell Brady (Melbourne)
- Laurie Brady (Melbourne)

Campbell and Laurie were brothers.

=== Brain ===
- Terry Brain (South Melbourne)
  - Peter Brain (South Melbourne)
  - Terry Brain Jr. (South Melbourne)

Terry was the father of Peter and Terry Jr.

=== Brayshaw ===
- Ian Brayshaw (Claremont)
  - Mark Brayshaw (Claremont, North Melbourne)
    - Angus Brayshaw (Melbourne)
    - Hamish Brayshaw (West Coast)
    - Andrew Brayshaw (Fremantle)

Ian is the father of Mark, who is the father of Angus, Hamish and Andrew.

=== Brennan ===
- Michael Brennan (East Fremantle, West Coast)
  - Jacob Brennan (West Coast, East Fremantle, East Perth)

Michael is the father of Jacob.

=== Brereton/May ===
- Dermott Brereton
- Archer May

Brereton is the step-father of May.

=== Brewer ===
- Ian Brewer (Collingwood, Claremont, Norwood)
- Ross Brewer (Melbourne, Collingwood, Richmond)

Ian is the elder brother of Ross

=== Briedis ===
- Arnold Briedis (North Melbourne)
- Robert Briedis (North Melbourne)

Arnold and Robert are brothers.

=== Brittain ===
- Craig Brittain (North Melbourne)
- Wayne Brittain (Carlton coach)

Wayne is the elder brother of Craig.

=== Broadbridge ===
- Troy Broadbridge
- Wayne Broadbridge

Wayne is the father of Troy.

=== Brooksby ===
- Graham Brooksby
- Phil Brooksby
  - Keegan Brooksby

Phil and Graham are twin brothers and Phil is the father of Keegan.

=== Brophy ===
- Bernie Brophy (Fitzroy)
- Frank Brophy (Fitzroy)
- Joe Brophy (Fitzroy)

Bernie, Frank and Joe were brothers.

=== Brown (1) ===
- Mal Brown (East Perth, Richmond, Claremont, South Fremantle)
  - Campbell Brown (Hawthorn, Gold Coast)

Mal is the father of Campbell.

=== Brown (2) ===
- Brian Brown (Fitzroy, Essendon)
  - Son: Jonathan Brown (Brisbane Lions)

Brian is the father of Jonathan.

=== Brown (3) ===
- Jack Brown (St Kilda)
- Ted Brown (St Kilda, Carlton)
  - Son: Vin Brown (Carlton)
  - Son: John Brown (Carlton)

Jack and Ted were brothers and Ted was the father of Vin and John.

=== Brown (4) ===
- Mitch Brown (West Coast)
- Nathan Brown (Collingwood, St Kilda)

Mitch and Nathan are identical twin brothers.

=== Brown (5) ===
- Gavin Brown (Collingwood)
  - Callum Brown (Collingwood)
  - Tyler Brown (Collingwood)
  - Tarni Brown (Collingwood)

Gavin is Callum, Tyler and Tarni's father.

=== Brown (6) ===
- Paul Brown (Geelong)
  - Daughter: Millie Brown (Geelong)

=== Brown (7) ===
- Nathan Brown(Melbourne)
  - Kynan Brown (Melbourne)

Nathan is Kynan's father.

=== Browne (1) ===
- Murray Browne (Collingwood, Fitzroy)
  - Son: Alex Browne (Essendon)

Murray is the father of Alex.

=== Browne (2) ===
- Mort Browne (Footscray)
  - Son: Morton Browne (Hawthorn)

Mort was the father of Morton.

=== Browne (3) ===
- Ricky Browne (Geelong)
- Mark Browne (Geelong)

Mark and Ricky are brothers.

=== Browning ===
- Keith Browning (South Melbourne)
  - Son: Mark Browning (Sydney)

Keith is the father of Mark.

=== Brownlees ===
- Rupe Brownlees (Geelong)
- Tom Brownlees (Geelong)

Rupe and Tom were brothers.

=== Brownless ===
- Anson Brownless (Sydney)
- Billy Brownless (Geelong)
- Blair Brownless (Collingwood)
- Oscar Luke Brownless

Anson, Billy and Blair are brothers and Oscar Luke is Billy's son.

=== Bruce ===
- George Bruce (Carlton, West Adelaide)
- Jim Bruce (West Adelaide)
- Percy Bruce (West Adelaide)

George, Jim and Percy were brothers.

=== Bryce ===
- Bob Bryce (Collingwood)
  - George Bryce (South Melbourne)
  - Ted Bryce (Essendon)

Bob was the father of George and Ted.

=== Bubner ===
- David Bubner (Central District)
- John Bubner (North Adelaide)
- Peter Bubner (Central District, Sturt)

John was the father of David and Peter.

=== Buckley (1) ===
- Brian W. Buckley (Footscray)
  - Ben Buckley (North Melbourne)
    - Jack Buckley

Brian is the father of Ben, who is the father of Jack.

=== Buckley (2) ===
- Jack Buckley (Carlton)
  - Brian Buckley
    - Mark Buckley
    - Stephen Buckley (Carlton, North Melbourne)

Jack was the father of Brian who is the father of Mark and Stephen.

=== Buckley (3) ===
- Ray Buckley (Woodville)
  - Nathan Buckley (Port Adelaide, Brisbane Lions, Collingwood)

Ray is the father of Nathan.

=== Buckley (4) ===
- Jim Buckley (Carlton)
  - Dylan Buckley (Carlton, Greater Western Sydney)

Jim is the father of Dylan.

=== Budarick ===
- Connor Budarick (Gold Coast)
- Craig Budarick (Glenelg)

Craig is Connor's father.

=== Bunton ===
- Haydn Bunton Sr. (Fitzroy, Subiaco, Port Adelaide)
  - Haydn Bunton Jr. (North Adelaide, Norwood, Swan Districts, Subiaco)

Haydn Sr. was the father of Haydn Jr.

=== Burgmann ===
- Jack Burgmann
  - Lloyd Burgmann
    - Shane Burgmann

Jack is the father of Lloyd and grandfather of Shane.

=== Burgoyne ===
- Peter Burgoyne Snr.
  - Peter Burgoyne
    - Trent Burgoyne
    - Jase Burgoyne
  - Shaun Burgoyne
    - Ky Burgoyne

Peter (Snr.) is the father of Peter and Shaun. Peter is the father of Trent and Jase. Shaun is the brother-in-law of Erin Phillips and son-in-law of Greg Phillips.

=== Burke (1) ===
- Gerald Burke (Carlton)
  - Rohan Burke (Carlton)

Gerald is the father of Rohan.

=== Burke (2) ===
- Nathan Burke (St Kilda)
  - Alice Burke (St Kilda)

Nathan is the father of Alice.

=== Burleigh ===
- Gordon Burleigh (Geelong)
- Wal Burleigh (Collingwood)

Gordon and Wal were brothers.

=== Burns ===
- Allen Burns (South Melbourne)
- Peter Burns (Geelong, South Melbourne)

Allen and Peter were brothers.

=== Burton (1) ===
- Peter Burton
  - Jay Burton
  - Matthew Burton
  - Travis Burton

Peter is the father of Matthew, Jay and Travis. All four played for Subiaco in the WAFL.

=== Burton (2) ===
- Craig Burton (Hawthorn, North Adelaide & Port Adelaide)
- Ryan Burton (North Adelaide & West Adelaide)

Craig is the father of Ryan.

=== Busbridge ===
- Bill Busbridge (Essendon)
- Norm Busbridge (Essendon)

Bill and Norm were brothers.

=== Butler (1) ===
- Archie Butler
- Charlie Butler

Archie and Charlie were brothers.

=== Butler (2) ===
- Dan Butler
- Sam Butler

Dan is the older brother of Sam.

=== Buttsworth ===
- Fred Buttsworth
- Wally Buttsworth

Wally is the elder brother of Fred

=== Button/Martin ===
- Hannah Button
- Rachelle Martin

Hannah is the older sister of Rachelle.

=== Byrne (1) ===
- Bill Byrne
- Charlie Byrne

Charlie is the older brother of Bill

=== Byrne (2) ===
- Alex Byrne
- Rex Byrne
- Tom Byrne

Alex, Rex and Tom were brothers.

== C ==
=== Cable ===
- Barry Cable
  - Shane Cable

Barry is Shane's father.

=== Cahill (1) ===
- Laurie Cahill (South Adelaide Richmond)
  - Nephew: Darrell Cahill (Port Adelaide)
  - Nephew: John Cahill (Port Adelaide)

Laurie was the uncle of Darrell and John, who are brothers.

=== Cahill (2) ===
- Pat Cahill
- Ted Cahill

Pat and Ted were brothers.

=== Callan ===
- Terry Callan
  - Tim Callan Geelong, Western Bulldogs

Terry is the father of Tim.

=== Caldwell ===
- Arthur Caldwell
- Jim Caldwell

Arthur was the elder brother of Jim.

=== Calverley ===
- Bruce Calverley
- Des Calverley
  - Graham Calverley
  - Ray Calverley

Des is the brother of Bruce and the father of Graham and Ray. Graham is the elder brother of Ray.

=== Calwell ===
- Bert Calwell
- Clarrie Calwell
- George Calwell (Carlton)

The three were brothers.

=== Cameron (1) ===
- Chris Cameron
  - Bill Cameron

Chris was the father of Bill.

=== Cameron (2) ===
- Charlie Cameron
- Jarrod Cameron

Charlie is the older brother of Jarrod.

=== Campbell ===
- Des Campbell
  - Blake Campbell
  - Brad Campbell

Des is the father of Blake and Brad.

=== Campbell (2) ===
- Colin Campbell
- Norm Campbell

Colin and Norm were brothers.

=== Campbell (3) ===
- Basil Campbell
- Warren Campbell

Basil is Warren's father.

=== Campbell (4) ===
- Adrian Campbell
  - Georgia Campbell (Melbourne)

Adrian is Georgia's father.

=== Camporeale ===
- Scott Camporeale
  - Lucas Camporeale
  - Ben Camporeale

Ben and Lucas are the twin sons of Scott.

=== Card ===
- George Card
  - Ray Card

George was the father of Ray.

=== Carmody ===
- Jack Carmody
  - John Carmody

Jack was the father of John.

=== Carr ===
- Josh Carr
- Matthew Carr
  - Jaren Carr

Josh and Matthew are brothers, Matthew is Jaren's father.

=== Carroll (1) ===
- Nathan Carroll
- Trent Carroll

Trent is the elder brother of Nathan.

=== Carroll (2) ===
- Tom Carroll
- Laurie Carroll
  - Dennis Carroll

Laurie is the father of Dennis and the brother of Tom.

=== Carruthers ===
- Ron H. Carruthers
  - Ron E. Carruthers

Ron H. was the father of Ron E.

=== Cassin ===
- Jack Cassin
  - John Cassin

Jack was the father of John.

=== Cazaly ===
- Ernest Cazaly
- Roy Cazaly
- Charlie Moore

Ernest and Roy were brothers. Charlie was their cousin.

=== Ceglar ===
- David Ceglar
  - John Ceglar

David is the father of John.

=== Chadwick ===
- Bert Chadwick
  - Bob Chadwick

Bert was the father of Bob.

=== Chamberlain ===
- Cornelius Chamberlain
- Jack Chamberlain
- Leonard Chamberlain

Cornelius, Jack and Leonard were brothers.

=== Chandler ===
- Gilbert Chandler
- Allan Chandler

Gil was the brother of Allan.

=== Chanter ===
- Fred Chanter
  - Vic Chanter

Fred was the father of Vic.

=== Chapman ===
- Charlie Chapman
  - James Chapman

Charlie was the father of James.

=== Charles ===
- John R. Charles
  - Justin Charles

John is the father of Justin.

=== Chitty ===
- Bob Chitty
- Peter Chitty

Peter was the elder brother of Bob.

=== Christensen ===
- Damien Christensen
- Marty Christensen
  - Allen Christensen

Damien was the elder brother of Marty. Allen is the nephew of Damien and Marty

=== Christou ===
- Jim Christou
- John Christou

Jim is the elder brother of John.

=== Clark ===
- Denis Clark
  - Michael Clark

Denis is the father of Michael.

=== Clarke (1) ===
- Raphael Clarke
- Xavier Clarke

Raphael and Xavier are brothers.

=== Clarke (2) ===
- Tom Clarke
  - Jack Clarke

Tom was the father of Jack.

=== Clarke (3) ===
- David Clarke
  - David Clarke
  - Tim Clarke

David E. is the father of Tim and David A.

=== Clarke (4) ===
- Fred Clarke
  - Neil Clarke

Fred was the father of Neil.

=== Clarke (5) ===
- Barry Clarke (Wilston Grange)
- Nathan Clarke (Brisbane Lions)

Barry is the father of Nathan.

=== Clay ===
- Bert Clay
- Ivor Clay

Bert and Ivor were twin brothers.

=== Clayton ===
- Scott Clayton
  - Josh Clayton

Scott is the father of Josh.

=== Clegg ===
- Brian Clegg
- Ron Clegg

Ron was the elder brother of Brian.

=== Clohesy ===
- Sam Clohesy
- Ted Clohesy

Sam and Ted are brothers.

=== Cloke ===
- Peter Cloke (Richmond, North Adelaide, Oakleigh)
- David Cloke
  - Cameron Cloke (Collingwood, Carlton, Port Adelaide, Williamstown, Preston)
  - Jason Cloke
  - Travis Cloke

David is the father of Cameron, Jason and Travis. Peter is David's elder brother.

=== Coates ===
- George Coates (Fitzroy)
  - Michael Coates (Fitzroy)

George was the father of Michael.

=== Cochrane ===
- Richard Cochrane (Central District)
- Stuart Cochrane (North Melbourne, Port Adelaide & Central District)
- Tom Cochrane (Port Adelaide)

Stuart is the son of Richard and the father of Tom.

=== Cock ===
- Arthur Cock
- Eric Cock
- Herbert Cock

Arthur, Eric and Herbert were brothers.

=== Cockatoo-Collins ===
- Che Cockatoo-Collins
- David Cockatoo-Collins
- Donald Cockatoo-Collins

Che, David and Donald are brothers.

=== Collier ===
- Albert Collier
- Harry Collier

Albert and Harry were brothers.

=== Collins (1) ===
- Goldie Collins (Fitzroy)
- Harry Collins (Fitzroy)
- Norm Collins (Fitzroy), Carlton and Hawthorn)

Goldie, Harry and Norm were brothers. Both Harry and Norm died before the age of 30.

=== Collins (2) ===
- Jim Collins
  - Allan Collins
  - Jack Collins

Jim is the father of Allan and Jack.

=== Collins (3) ===
- Jack Collins
  - Daryl Collins
  - Denis Collins

Jack was the father of Denis and Daryl.

=== Collins (4) ===
- Jack Collins
  - Geoff Collins
  - Mike Collins

Jack was the father of Geoff and Mike.

=== Comben ===
- Aubrey Comben
  - Bruce Comben
  - John Comben

Aubrey was the father of Bruce and John.

=== Connolly ===
- Barry Connolly
  - Chris Connolly

Barry is the father of Chris.

=== Considine ===
- Bernie Considine
- Frank Considine
- Maurie Considine
  - Paul Considine

Bernie, Maurie and Frank are brothers, Paul is Maurie's son.

=== Conway ===
- Isaac Conway
- Sophie Conway

Isaac is the elder brother of Sophie. Both have been on Brisbane Lions lists, in the AFL and AFL Women's respectively.

=== Cook ===
- Fred Cook
- Keith Cook

Fred and Keith were twins.

=== Cooper ===
- Graham Cooper
- Ian Cooper

Graham is the elder brother of Ian.

=== Coppock ===
- Fred Coppock
  - Kevin Coppock

Fred was the father of Kevin.

=== Cordner ===
- Henry (Harry) Cordner
- Edward Rae Cordner
  - George Denis (Denis) Cordner
  - Donald Pruen (Don) Cordner
    - Granddaughter: Harriet Cordner
  - John Pruen Cordner
  - Edward Pruen (Ted) Cordner
    - David Baillieu Cordner
- Cousin: Laurence Osmaston (Larry) Cordner
- Cousin: Joseph Alan (Alan) Cordner

Edward Rae Cordner was the brother of Harry Cordner and the father of Ted, Don, Denis and John Cordner.

Ted Cordner was the father of David Cordner. Edward Rae Cordner and Harry Cordner were first cousins of Larry Cordner and Alan Cordner (who were half-brothers).

Harriet Cordner is the granddaughter of 1946 Brownlow Medallist Don Cordner, she is the first grandfather–granddaughter recruit to play AFL in the Women's League (AFLW).

=== Cordy ===
- Graeme Cordy
- Neil Cordy
- Brian Cordy
  - Ayce Cordy
  - Zaine Cordy

Brian, Graeme and Neil are brothers. Ayce and Zaine are sons of Brian.

=== Corrigan/Robertson ===
- Tommy Corrigan
  - Leigh Robertson
  - Glenn Robertson

Leigh and Glenn are brothers, and are the grandsons of Tom Corrigan.

=== Cornes ===
- Graham Cornes
  - Chad Cornes
  - Kane Cornes

Graham is the father of Chad and Kane.

=== Couch ===
- Paul Couch
  - Tom Couch

Paul was the father of Tom.

=== Cousins ===
- Bryan Cousins
  - Ben Cousins

Bryan is the father of Ben.

=== Coventry ===
- Gordon Coventry
- Hugh Coventry
- Syd Coventry
- Syd Coventry Jr.
- James Walker
- Alex Denney

Gordon and Syd were brothers. Syd was the father of Hugh and Syd Jr. James is Gordon's great-grandson.

=== Cranage ===
- Paul Cranage
  - Sam Cranage

Paul is the father of Sam.

=== Crane ===
- Jack Crane
- Len Crane
- Tom Crane

Jack was the elder brother of Len and Tom.

=== Cransberg ===
- Alan Cransberg
- Peter Cransberg

Alan is the elder brother of Peter.

=== Crapper ===
- Frank Crapper
- Fred Crapper
- Harry Crapper

All three are brothers.

=== Crawford ===
- Justin Crawford
- Shane Crawford

Shane is the elder brother of Justin.

=== Crimmins ===
- Bryan Crimmins
  - Peter Crimmins

Bryan was the father of Peter.

=== Cross ===
- Joel Cross (South Adelaide)
  - Mark Cross

Mark is the father of Joel.

=== Crosswell/Kavanagh ===
- Brent Crosswell
  - Tom Kavanagh

Brent is the father of Tom.

=== Crouch ===
- Brad Crouch
- Matt Crouch

Brad and Matt are brothers.

=== Crow ===
- Justin Crow
  - Max Crow

Max is the father of Justin

=== Cummings/Johnson ===
- Percy Cummings
- Robert Cummings
- Trent Cummings
- Joe Johnson
- Percy Johnson

Percy Cummings is the father of Robert and Trent. Joe was the father of Percy Johnson and grandfather of Percy Cummings.

=== Cunningham (1) ===
- Jack Cunningham
- John Cunningham
- Tom Cunningham

Tom was the father of Jack and Jack is the father of John.

=== Cunningham (2) ===
- Daryl Cunningham
- Geoff Cunningham

Daryl and Geoff are brothers.

=== Curnow ===
- Ed Curnow
- Charlie Curnow

Ed is the older brother of Charlie.

=== Curran ===
- Kevin Curran
  - Pat Curran

Kevin was the father of Pat.

=== Curtin ===
- Daniel Curtin
- Cody Curtin

Daniel is the older brother of Cody

== D ==
=== Daicos ===
- Peter Daicos
  - Josh Daicos
  - Nick Daicos

Peter is Josh's and Nick's father.

=== Daly ===
- Anthony "Bos" Daly
- John "Bunny" Daly

Bunny was the elder brother of Bos

=== Daniher ===
- Anthony Daniher
  - Darcy Daniher
  - Joe Daniher
- Chris Daniher
- Neale Daniher
- Terry Daniher

Anthony is the father of Darcy and Joe and the brother of Chris, Neale and Terry.

=== Darcy ===
- David Darcy
  - Luke Darcy
    - Sam Darcy

David is Luke's father and Sam's grandfather.

=== Davey ===
- Aaron Davey
- Alwyn Davey
  - Alwyn Davey Jr
  - Jayden Davey

Aaron and Alwyn are brothers. Alwyn is the father of identical twins Alwyn Jr and Jayden.

=== Davidson ===
- Garry Davidson
  - Tom Davidson

Garry is the father of Tom.

=== Davies ===
- Darcie Davies
- Fleur Davies
- Giselle Davies

Darcie, Fleur and Giselle are sisters.

=== Davis (1) ===
- Craig Davis
  - Nick Davis

Craig is the father of Nick.

=== Davis (2) ===
- Allan Davis
  - Chad Davis

Allan is the father of Chad.

=== Day ===
- Ian Day
- Robert Day
- Will Day
- Sam Day

Ian and Robert are brothers. Will is Robert's grandson, and Sam is Ian's grandson.

=== Daykin ===
- Bert Daykin
- Percy Daykin
- Richard Daykin
- Robert Daykin

Bert was the elder brother of Percy and Richard.

=== Dayman ===
- Clem Dayman
- Les Dayman

- Lisle Dayman (Son)

Les was the younger brother of Clem and is the grandfather of Chris McDermott who was the Adelaide Crows first captain.

=== Dean ===
- Fred Dean
  - Ken Dean
  - Norm Dean

Fred was the father of Ken and Norm.

=== Dear ===
- Greg Dear
- Paul Dear (Hawthorn)
  - Calsher Dear
  - Harry Dear

Greg and Paul are brothers. Paul is the father of Calsher and Harry.

=== Deas ===
- Bob Deas
- Jack Deas

Jack was the elder brother of Bob.

=== de Gruchy ===
- Bill de Gruchy
- Harold de Gruchy

Bill and Harold were brothers.

=== De Koning ===
- Terry De Koning
  - Tom De Koning
  - Sam De Koning

Terry is the father of Sam and Tom.

=== Delahunty ===
- Hugh Delahunty
- Mike Delahunty

Hugh is the elder brother of Mike.

=== Deledio ===
- Wayne Deledio
  - Brett Deledio

Wayne is Brett's father

=== Deluca ===
- Adrian Deluca
- Fabian Deluca

Adrian is Fabian's elder brother

=== Demetriou ===
- Andrew Demetriou
- Jim Demetriou

Jim is the elder brother of Andrew.

=== Dempster ===
- Graham Dempster
  - Sean Dempster

Graham is the father of Sean.

=== Dick ===
- Alec Dick
  - Billy Dick
- Robert Dick

Alec and Robert were brothers. Billy was the son of Alec.

=== Dimattina ===
- Frank Dimattina
  - Paul Dimattina
  - Andrew Dimattina

Frank is the father of Paul and Andrew.

=== Dixon ===
- Joe Dixon
  - Ben Dixon

Joe is the father of Ben.

=== Doig ===
- George Doig
- Norm Doig
- Ron Doig Sr.

All three are first cousins. Another 14 members of the family have played in the WAFL over the years, for a combined total of 39 premierships and 35 runners-up.

=== Donnelly ===
- Andy Donnelly
- Gerry Donnelly

Andy and Gerry were brothers.

=== Dow ===
- Paddy Dow
- Thomson Dow

Paddy is the older brother of Thomson.

=== Dowrick ===
- Abbey Dowrick
- McKenzie Dowrick

McKenzie is the older sister of Abbey.

=== Dowsing ===
- Alf Dowsing
- Rob Dowsing
- Roy Dowsing

Alf was the father of Roy and the grandfather of Rob.

=== Doyle ===
- Robert Doyle
  - Stephen Doyle

Robert is the father of Stephen.

=== Drum ===
- Damian Drum
  - Marcus Drum

Damian is Marcus' uncle.

=== Duckworth ===
- Billy Duckworth
- John Duckworth

John is the elder brother of Billy.

=== Dugdale ===
- Dean Dugdale
- Glenn Dugdale
- John Dugdale

John is the father of Dean and Glenn.

=== Dullard ===
- Adrian Dullard
  - Tony Dullard

Adrian was the father of Tony.

=== Dummett ===
- Alf Dummett
- Charlie Dummett

Alf was the elder brother of Charlie.

=== Dunbar ===
- Edgar Dunbar
- Harold Dunbar
- Hugh Dunbar

Edgar, Harold and Hugh were brothers.

=== Duncan ===
- Glen Rogers
  - Mitch Duncan

Glen, who played for East Fremantle, is Mitch's father.

=== Dunell ===
- Frank Dunell
  - Sam Dunell

Frank is the father of Sam.

=== Dunkley ===
- Andrew Dunkley
  - Kyle Dunkley
  - Josh Dunkley

Andrew is the father of Kyle and Josh.

=== Dunn ===
- Harvey Dunn Sr.
  - Harvey Dunn Jr.

Harvey Sr. was the father of Harvey Jr.

=== Dunstan ===
- Maurie Dunstan
  - Graeme Dunstan
  - Ian Dunstan

Maurie is the father of Graeme and Ian.

=== Duursma ===
- Jamie Duursma
- Dean Duursma
  - Xavier Duursma (Essendon & Port Adelaide)
  - Yasmin Duursma (Carlton & Port Adelaide)
  - Zane Duursma
  - Willem Duursma

Jamie and Dean are brothers and Dean is the father of Willem, Xavier, Yasmin and Zane.

=== Dwyer ===
- Leo Dwyer
  - Laurie Dwyer
    - Anthony Dwyer
    - David Dwyer

Leo was the father of Laurie and grandfather of Anthony and David. Leo was also the uncle of Keith Harper.

=== Dyer ===
- Jack Dyer
  - Jack Dyer Jr.

Jack was the father of Jack Jr.

== E ==
=== Eason ===
- Alec Eason
- Bill Eason
  - Dick Eason

Alec and Bill were brothers. Alec was the father of Dick.

=== Easton ===
- Kevin Easton
- Stephen Easton

Kevin was the father of Stephen.

=== Ebert ===
- Russell Ebert (Port Adelaide & North Melbourne)
  - Brett Ebert (Port Adelaide)
- Craig Ebert (Port Adelaide & West Adelaide)
  - Brad Ebert(West Coast & Port Adelaide)
- Jeff Ebert (Port Adelaide)
  - Daniel Ebert (North Adelaide)
    - Laela Ebert (Melbourne & North Adelaide)
  - Ricky Ebert (North Adelaide)

Russell is the brother of Craig and father of Brett. Craig is the father of Brad. Jeff is the brother of Russell and Craig. Jeff is the father of Daniel and Ricky, and grandfather of Laela.

=== Edmond ===
- Bob Edmond
- Jim Edmond

Bob was the elder brother of Jim.

=== Edwards (1) ===
- Alan Edwards
- Doug Edwards
- Greg Edwards (Central Districts)
- Kym Edwards
- Russell Edwards
- Shane Edwards (North Adelaide, Richmond))

Alan was the father of Doug, the grandfather of Greg and Russell and the great-grandfather of Kym and Shane.

=== Edwards (2) ===
- Tyson Edwards
  - Jackson Edwards
  - Luke Edwards

Tyson is the father of Jackson and Luke.

=== Egan/Lovett ===
- Alf Egan
- Ted Lovett

Alf was the father of Ted.

=== Elliott ===
- Bruce Elliott
- Glenn Elliott
- Robert Elliott

Bruce, Glenn and Robert are brothers.

=== Ellis ===
- Kingsley Ellis
- Lindsay Ellis
- Ted Ellis

Ted was the father of Kingsley and Lindsay.

=== Emselle ===
- Ken Emselle
- Richie Emselle

Richie was the father of Ken.

=== Erwin ===
- Michael Erwin
- Mick Erwin

Mick is the father of Michael.

=== Evans (1) ===
- Alfie Evans
- Rodney Evans

Alfie was the father of Rodney.

=== Evans (2) ===
- Neil Evans
- Ron Evans

Ron was the elder brother of Neil.

=== Everitt ===
- Andrejs Everitt
- Peter Everitt

Peter is the elder brother of Andrejs.

== F ==
=== Fanning ===
- Fred Fanning
- John Fanning

Fred was the father of John.

=== Farmer ===
- Horrie Farmer
- Horrie H. Farmer

Horrie H. was the father of Horrie.

=== Farrant ===
- Doug Farrant
- Gary Farrant

Gary is the elder brother of Doug.

=== Febey ===
- Matthew Febey
- Steven Febey

Matthew and Steven are twins.

=== Fehring ===
- Arthur Fehring
- Charlie Fehring

Charlie was the elder brother of Arthur.

=== Feldmann ===
- Derek Feldmann
- Rick Feldmann

Derek and Rick are brothers.

=== Fellowes ===
- Graeme Fellowes
- Wes Fellowes

Graeme is the father of Wes.

=== Ferguson ===
- Jack T. Ferguson
- John K. Ferguson

Jack was the father of John.

=== Fidge ===
- John Fidge
- Ted Fidge

John and Ted are brothers.

=== Fields ===
- Neville Fields
- Tom Fields

Neville is Tom's father.

=== Fincher ===
- Charlie Fincher (South Melbourne)
- Jack Fincher

Charlie was the elder brother of Jack.

=== Fleming ===
- Ian Fleming
- Keith Fleming

Ian and Keith were twins.

=== Fletcher (1) ===
- Ken Fletcher
  - Dustin Fletcher

Ken is Dustin's father.

=== Fletcher (2) ===
- Daniel Fletcher
- Simon Fletcher

Daniel and Simon are brothers.

=== Fletcher (3) ===
- Adrian Fletcher
  - Jaspa Fletcher

Adrian is the father of Jaspa.

=== Flower ===
- Robert Flower
- Tom Flower

Robbie and Tom are brothers.

=== Fogarty ===
- Tom Fogarty
- Chris Fogarty
- John Fogarty
- Joe Fogarty
- Tom Fogarty Jr.

Tom, Chris, John, and Joe were brothers. Tom Fogarty Jr. is the son of Tom B. Fogarty.

=== Foster ===
- Jack Foster
- Rob Foster

Jack was the father of Rob.

=== Fox ===
- Arthur Fox Jr.
- Arthur Fox Sr.

Arthur Sr. was the father of Arthur Jr.

=== Francis (1) ===
- Jack Francis
- Jim Francis
- Syd Francis

Jack, Jim and Syd were brothers.

=== Francis (2) ===
- Fabian Francis (Southern Districts, Melbourne, Brisbane Bears, Port Adelaide, South Fremantle)
  - Jason Horne-Francis (North Melbourne & Port Adelaide)

Fabian is Jason's step-father.

=== Francou ===
- Josh Francou (North Adelaide & Port Adelaide)
- Oliver Francou

Josh is Oliver's father.

=== Fraser (1) ===
- Don Fraser Jr.
- Don Fraser Sr.

Don Sr. was the father of Don Jr.

=== Fraser (2) ===
- Ken Fraser
- Mark Fraser

Ken is the father of Mark.

=== Frederick ===
- Martin Frederick
- Michael Frederick

Martin and Michael are twin brothers.

=== Freeborn ===
- Glenn Freeborn
- Scott Freeborn

Glenn is the elder brother of Scott.

=== Frost ===
- Jack Frost
- Sam Frost

Jack and Sam are brothers.

=== Fry ===
- Charlie Fry (Port Adelaide)
- James Fry (Port Adelaide)

Charlie and James were brothers.

== G ==
=== Galbally ===
- Frank Galbally
- Jack Galbally
- Bob Galbally

Jack was the elder brother of Frank and Bob.

=== Gale ===
- Brendon Gale
- Jack Gale
- Michael Gale

Jack was the grandfather of brothers Brendon and Michael.

=== Gallagher (1) ===
- Jim Gallagher
- Ross Gallagher

Jim was the father of Ross.

=== Gallagher (2) ===
- James Gallagher
- John Gallagher
- Martin Gallagher
- Phil Gallagher
- Sam Gallagher
- Martin McKinnon

Sam is the father of John, Martin and Phil and the grandfather of James and Martin McKinnon.

=== Garbutt ===
- Joe Garbutt Jr.
- Joe Garbutt

Joe was the father of Joe Jr.

=== Gardner ===
- Corrie Gardner
- Eric Gardner
- Mark Gardner

Corrie, Eric and Mark were brothers.

=== Gardiner (1) ===
- Jack Gardiner
- Vin Gardiner

Jack was the elder brother of Vin.

=== Gardiner (2) ===
- Alex Gardiner Sr.
- Alex Gardiner

Alex Sr. was the father of Alex.

=== Gardner ===
- Corrie Gardner
- Eric Gardner

Corrie was the elder brother of Eric.

=== Garlick ===
- George Garlick Sr.
  - George Garlick

George Sr. was the father of George.

=== Gaspar ===
- Damien Gaspar
- Darren Gaspar
- Travis Gaspar

Damien, Darren and Travis are brothers

=== Gaudion ===
- Charlie Gaudion
  - Michael Gaudion

Charlie was the father of Michael.

=== Gehrig ===
- Phil Gehrig
- Fraser Gehrig

Phil was a cousin of Fraser's father.

=== Georgiades ===
- John Georgiades St Kilda
  - Mitch Georgiades Port Adelaide

John is the father of Mitch.

=== Gerrand ===
- Bill Gerrand Sr.
- Bill Gerrand Jr.

Bill was the father of Bill Jr.

=== Gibb ===
- Len Gibb
- Percy Gibb
- Reg Gibb
  - Ray Gibb
- Rupert Gibb

Reg was the father of Ray and brother of Len, Percy and Rupert.

=== Gibbs ===
- Bryce Gibbs
- Ross Gibbs

Ross is the father of Bryce.

=== Giles ===
- Glenn Giles
- Peter Giles

Glenn and Peter are brothers.

=== Gill (1) ===
- Barry Gill
- John Gill

John is the elder brother of Barry.

=== Gill (2) ===
- Dick Gill
- Frank Gill

Frank was the father of Dick.

=== Gillespie ===
- Dave Gillespie
- Doug Gillespie

Dave and Doug were twin brothers

=== Gilmore ===
- Brian Gilmore
- Daniel Gilmore

Brian is the grandfather of Daniel.

=== Glascott ===
- David Glascott
- Stuart Glascott

David is the elder brother of Stuart.

=== Gleeson ===
- Adrian Gleeson
- Martin Gleeson

Adrian is the uncle of Martin.

=== Glendinning ===
- Gus Glendinning
- Ross Glendinning

Gus was the father of Ross.

=== Goggin ===
- Bill Goggin
- Matt Goggin

Bill and Matt are brothers.

=== Gomez ===
- Frank Gomez Sr.
- Frank Gomez Jr.

Frank Sr. is the father of Frank Jr.

=== Goodes ===
- Adam Goodes
- Brett Goodes

Adam and Brett are brothers.

=== Goonan ===
- Jim H. Goonan
- Jimmy Goonan

Jim is the father of Jimmy.

=== Goss ===
- Kevin Goss
- Norm Goss Jr.
- Norm Goss Sr.
- Paul Goss

Norm is the father of Kevin, Norm and Paul.

=== Gotch ===
- Brad Gotch
- Graham Gotch
- Seb Gotch
- Xavier Gotch

Graham was the father of Brad. Brad is the father of Seb and Xavier.

=== Gotz ===
- Bruce Gotz
- Martin Gotz

Martin was the father of Bruce.

=== Gowans ===
- Chris Gowans
- James Gowans

Chris and James are twins. Their father Peter Gowans was a premiership player for Victorian Football Association (VFA) club Caulfield.

=== Gowers ===
- Billy Gowers
- Andrew Gowers
- Trevor Gowers

Andrew is the son of Trevor and father of Bill.

=== Grace ===
- Jim Grace
- Joe Grace
- Mick Grace

Jim was the eldest brother; Joe was the youngest.

=== Graham (1) ===
- Jack Graham
  - Ricky Graham
    - Ben Graham

Jack was the father of Ricky and grandfather of Ben. Ricky is Ben's uncle.

=== Graham (2) ===
- Cecil Graham
  - Cecil's sons, Rex ("Curra"), Fred ("Tonga"), and Bradley Graham
    - Bradley's sons, Phil Graham, Colin Graham, and Brenton Graham
- Michael Graham, uncle of Phil, Colin, and Brenton

=== Grainger ===
- Gary Grainger
- George Grainger

George is the father of Gary.

=== Grambeau ===
- Mick Grambeau
  - Son: Shane Grambeau

=== Grant ===
- Chris Grant
  - Daughter: Isabella Grant

=== Green (1) ===
- Bob Green
- Jack Green

Bob and Jack were brothers.

=== Green (2) ===
- Jack Green Sr.
  - Jack Green Jr.
    - Jack Green III

Jack Sr. was the father of Jack Jr. and the grandfather of Jack III.

=== Greene ===
- Russell Greene
  - Steven Greene

Russell is the father of Steven.

=== Greenhill ===
- Charlie Greenhill
- Jack Greenhill

Charles and Jack were brothers.

=== Gregory ===
- Bruce Gregory (North Melbourne)
- John Gregory (North Melbourne)

Bruce and John were brothers.

=== Greeves ===
- Ted Greeves
  - Edward Greeves Jr.

Ted was the father of Edward.

=== Grigg (1) ===
- Dick Grigg
- Norm Grigg

Norm was the younger brother of Dick.

=== Grigg (2) ===
- Chris Grigg (Norwood)
- Mitch Grigg (Adelaide & Norwood)

Chris is the father of Mitch.

=== Grima ===
- Alex Grima: Glenelg, South Fremantle, Hawthorn rookie list, Box Hill
- Nathan Grima: North Melbourne
- Todd Grima: Glenelg, Geelong rookie list, Geelong (VFL)

Nathan is the oldest brother, Alex is the youngest

=== Grimes ===
- Dylan Grimes
- Jack Grimes

Jack is the older brother of Dylan.

=== Grimley ===
- Ken Grimley
  - Brett Grimley
    - Sam Grimley

Ken is the father of Brett, who is the father of Sam.

=== Grimm ===
- Colin Grimm (Port Adelaide)
- Rodney Grimm (Port Adelaide)
- Shane Grimm (Port Adelaide)

Colin was Rodney's father and Shane's grandfather.

=== Guinane ===
- Danny Guinane
- Paddy Guinane

Danny was the father of Paddy.

=== Gull ===
- Jim Gull
- Stewart Gull

Jim was the father of Stewart.

=== Gunn/Ward ===
- Bill Gunn (South Melbourne)
- Callan Ward (Western Bulldogs, Greater Western Sydney)

Bill Gunn is the grandfather of Callan Ward.

=== Guthrie ===
- Cameron Guthrie
- Zach Guthrie

Cameron is the older brother of Zach.

== H ==
=== Hacker ===
- Alf Hacker
- Jack Hacker

Alf was the elder brother of Jack.

=== Hall (1) ===
- Grahame Hall
- Peter Hall

Grahame was the father of Peter.

=== Hall (2) ===
- Clay Hall (Peel Thunder & West Coast)
- Derek Hall (Geelong, West Perth & West Coast)

Derek is Clay's father.

=== Hallahan ===
- Jim Hallahan Jr.
- Jim Hallahan Sr.
- Mike Hallahan
- Tom Hallahan

Jim Sr. was the father of Jim Jr. and Tom and the grandfather of Mike.

=== Halloran ===
- Danny Halloran
- Frank Halloran

Frank was the father of Danny.

=== Hamilton ===
- Alexia Hamilton (Sydney Swans)
- Cynthia Hamilton (Sydney Swans)
- Riley Hamilton (Greater Western Sydney Giants)

Alexia and Cynthia are sisters. Riley is their brother.

=== Hammond ===
- Billy Hammond
- Charlie Hammond
- Jack Hammond

Jack was the elder of the three brothers, and Billy was the younger.

=== Hampson ===
- Damian Hampson (Subiaco & West Coast Eagles)
- Reg Hampson (Subiaco)

Reg is the father of Damian.

=== Hank ===
- Barry Hank
- Bill Hank
- Bob Hank
- Ray Hank

Bill, Bob and Ray were brothers. Barry is Bob's son.

=== Hanley ===
- Pearce Hanley
- Cian Hanley

Pearce is the elder brother of Cian. Both have been listed for the Brisbane Lions, whilst Pierce has also played for Gold Coast.

=== Hannebery ===
- Dan Hannebery
- Mark Hannebery
- Matt Hannebery
- Ian Aitken
- Luke O'Sullivan

Matt is the father of Dan and younger brother of Mark. Luke O'Sullivan is the brother of Matt's wife. Ian Aitken is married to the sister of Matt's wife.

=== Hanton ===
- Alex Hanton
- Harold Hanton (Carlton)

Alec and Harold were twin brothers.

=== Hardie ===
- Brad Hardie (South Fremantle, Footscray, Brisbane, Collingwood)
- Wayne Hardie (East Fremantle)

Brad and Wayne are brothers.

=== Hardiman ===
- Jack Hardiman
- Les Hardiman
- Peter Hardiman

Jack was the father of Peter and Les.

=== Hardy ===
- Charlie Hardy
- Jack Hardy

Charlie was the father of Jack.

=== Hargrave ===
- Ryan Hargrave
- Steve Hargrave

Steve is the father of Ryan.

=== Harper ===
- Bruce Harper
- Roy Harper

Bruce and Ray were brothers.

=== Harris (1) ===
- Bernie Harris
- Leon Harris

Leon is the elder brother of Bernie

=== Harris (2) ===
- Brenton Harris (North Melbourne, South Adelaide)
- Darren Harris (North Melbourne, South Adelaide)

Darren is the elder brother of Brenton

=== Hart ===
- Arthur Hart
- Don Hart
- Eddie Hart

Arthur, Don, and Eddie were brothers; and, also, they were the nephews of Bob King, their mother's brother.

=== Hartigan ===
- Brent Hartigan
- Dean Hartigan
- Jack Hartigan

Jack was the father of Dean and grandfather of Brent.

=== Hartlett ===
- Adam Hartlett
- Hamish Hartlett

Adam is the older brother of Hamish.

=== Harvey (1) ===
- Anthony Harvey
- Robert Harvey

Robert is the elder brother of Anthony

=== Harvey (2) ===
- Bill Harvey
  - Brent Harvey
    - Cooper Harvey
  - Shane Harvey

Brent is the elder brother of Shane. Bill is their grandfather. Cooper is the son of Brent.

=== Hawking ===
- Fred Hawking
- Simon Hawking

Fred was Simon's grandfather.

=== Hawkins ===
- Jack Hawkins
- Michael Hawkins
- Robb Hawkins
- Tom Hawkins
- Fred Le Deux

Jack, Michael and Robb are brothers. Jack is Tom's father. Fred is Tom's grandfather and Jack's father-in-law.

=== Hay (1) ===
- Bill Hay
- Phil Hay
- Sted Hay

Bill, Phil and Sted were brothers.

=== Hay (2) ===
- Ced Hay
- Harold Hay

Ced and Harold were brothers.

=== Hay (3) ===
- Charlie Hay (Port Adelaide)
- James Hay (Port Adelaide)

Charlie and James were brothers.

=== Hayes ===
- Phonse Hayes
- John Hayes

Phonse and John were brothers.

=== Haynes ===
- Tiah Haynes
- John Haynes (Perth)

John is Tiah's father.

=== Heal ===
- Graham Heal
- Jack Heal (Melbourne)
- Stan Heal (Melbourne)

Jack and Stan were brothers and Stan was the father of Graham.

=== Healy ===
- Gerard Healy
- Greg Healy
- Bill O'Brien

Gerard and Greg are brothers. Bill O'Brien was their grandfather.

=== Heenan ===
- Jim F. Heenan
- Jim P. Heenan

Jim F. was the father of Jim P.

=== Hellwig ===
- Gordon Hellwig
- Herman Hellwig

Herman was the father of Gordon.

=== Henry ===
- Jack Henry
- Oliver Henry

Jack is the older brother of Oliver.

=== Heppell ===
- Malcolm Heppell (Norwood)
- Martin Heppell (St Kilda, Melbourne and Norwood)

Malcolm and Martin are brothers.

=== Higgins/Orr ===
- Shaun Higgins
- Danielle Orr

Higgins is Orr's brother.

=== Hill ===
- Bradley Hill
- Stephen Hill

Stephen is the elder brother of Bradley.

=== Himmelberg ===
- Harry Himmelberg
- Elliott Himmelberg

Harry is the elder brother of Elliott.

=== Hinge ===
- John Hinge
- Mitch Hinge

John is the elder brother of Mitch.

=== Hinman ===
- Arthur Hinman
- Bill Hinman

Arthur and Bill were brothers.

=== Hird ===
- Allan Hird Sr.
- Allan Hird Jr.
- James Hird

Allan is the father of Allan Jr. and the grandfather of James.

=== Hiskins ===
- Arthur Hiskins
- Fred Hiskins
- Rupe Hiskins
- Stan Hiskins
- Jack Hiskins

Arthur, Fred, Rupe and Stan were brothers. Jack was the son of Fred.

=== Hocking (1) ===
- Garry Hocking
- Steven Hocking

Brett rhode cosin

=== Hocking (2) ===
- Graham Hocking
- Heath Hocking

Graham is the father of Heath.

=== Hodgkin ===
- Frank Hodgkin
- Bob Hodgkin

Frank is the elder brother of Robert.

=== Hogan ===
- Jesse Hogan
- Tony Hogan

Tony (Subiaco) is the father of Jesse

=== Hoiles ===
- John E. Hoiles
- John M. Hoiles

John E. Hoiles is father of John M. Hoiles

=== Holland ===
- Ben Holland
- Nick Holland

Ben and Nick are brothers.

=== Hollands ===
- Ben Hollands
  - Elijah Hollands
  - Oliver Hollands

Ben is the father of Elijah and Oliver.

=== Hollick ===
- Greg Hollick
- Monique Hollick

Greg is the father of Monique.

=== Horman ===
- George Horman
- James Horman

James is the older brother of George.

=== Horkings ===
- Ray Horkings
- Reg Horkings

Reg was the father of Ray.

=== Hosking (1) ===
- Ron Hosking
- Scott Hosking

Ron is the father of Scott.

=== Hosking (2) ===
- Jess Hosking
- Sarah Hosking

Jess and Sarah are twin sisters.

=== Houghton ===
- Gemma Houghton
- Joel Houghton (Perth, Swan Districts & East Perth)

Gemma and Joel are siblings.

=== Houlihan ===
- Adam Houlihan
- Damian Houlihan
- Ryan Houlihan

Adam, Damian and Ryan are brothers. Another sibling, Josh, was recruited by St Kilda but never played in the AFL.

=== Hovey ===
- Ced Hovey
- Jim Hovey
- Ron Hovey
- Wayne Hovey

Ron, Ced and Jim are brothers, Jim is the father of Wayne.

=== Howell (1) ===
- Jack P. Howell
- Jack Howell jnr
- Scott Howell

Jack P was the father of Jack Jnr and the grandfather of Scott.

=== Howell (2) ===
- Bevis Howell
- Verdun Howell

Bevis and Verdun were brothers. Bevis won the 1952 Grogan Medal in Queensland

=== Howson ===
- Herb Howson
- Henry Howson

Henry and Herb were brothers.

=== Hudson ===
- Paul Hudson
- Peter Hudson

Peter is Paul's father. Simon Minton-Connell is Paul's cousin.

=== Huggard ===
- Jack Huggard
- Jackie Huggard

Jack was the father of Jackie.

=== Hughes ===
- Frank 'Checker' Hughes
- Frank Hughes Jr.

Frank was the father of Frank Jr.

=== Hughson ===
- Mick Hughson
- Les Hughson
  - Les Hughson Jr.
- Fred Hughson
  - Denis Hughson

Les, Mick and Fred were brothers, Les was the father of Les Jr. and Fred was the father of Denis.

=== Hunter ===
- Cameron Hunter
- Ken Hunter

Ken is the father of Cameron.

=== Huntington ===
- Jack Huntington
- Les Huntington
- Stan Huntington
  - Bill Huntington

Jack, Les and Stan were brothers. Bill is the son of Stan.

=== Huppatz ===
- Eric Huppatz
  - Kevin Huppatz

Kevin was the son of Eric.

=== Hurn ===
- William Hurn
  - Shannon Hurn

William is the father of Shannon.

=== Hynes ===
- Cooper Hynes
- John Hynes

John is the father of Cooper.

== I ==
=== Icke ===
- Bill Icke
- Laurie Icke
  - Steven Icke

Laurie is the brother of Bill and the father of Steven.

=== Incigneri ===
- Len Incigneri
- Matt Incigneri

Len and Matt were brothers.

=== Ion ===
- Barry Ion
- Graham Ion

Graham is the elder brother of Barry.

=== Irwin ===
- Frank Irwin
- Vince Irwin

Frank is the elder brother of Vince.

== J ==
=== Jack ===
- Brandon Jack
- Kieren Jack

Brandon is the younger brother of Kieren, both are sons of rugby league legend Garry Jack.

=== Jakovich ===
- Gary Jakovich (South Fremantle)
- Allen Jakovich (Footscray, Melbourne, South Fremantle & Woodville)
- Glen Jakovich

Allen, Gary and Glen are brothers.

=== James (1) ===
- Brett James
- Roger James
- Paul James

Brett and Roger and Paul are siblings – Brett and Roger played AFL and SANFL and Paul played SANFL.

=== James (2) ===
- John James
  - Michael James

John is the father of Michael.

=== James (3) ===
- Max James
  - Heath James

Max is the father of Heath.

=== James (4) ===
- Fred James
- Les James
- Syd James

Fred, Les and Syd were brothers.

=== Jarman ===
- Andrew Jarman
- Darren Jarman
- Ben Jarman

Andrew and Darren are brothers. Ben is the son of Darren.

=== Jeffrey ===
- Joel Jeffrey
- Russell Jeffrey

Russell is Joel's father.

=== Jetta ===
- Graham Jetta (Swan Districts)
- Lewis Jetta (Sydney & West Coast)
- Neville Jetta (Melbourne)

Graham and Lewis are brothers. Neville is their cousin.

=== Jewell ===
- Nick Jewell
- Tony Jewell

Tony is the father of Nick.

=== John ===
- Graeme John
  - Gareth John

Graeme is the father of Gareth.

=== Johns ===
- Alwyn Johns
- Keith Johns

Alwyn and Keith were brothers.

=== Johnson (1) ===
- Bob B. Johnson
- Bob C. Johnson

Bob C. was Bob B's father.

=== Johnson (2) ===
- Alan Johnson
- Chris Johnson

Alan is the father of Chris.

=== Johnson (3) ===
- David Johnson
- Mark Johnson

Mark is the elder brother of David.

=== Johnston ===
- Jack Johnston
- Charlie Johnston

Charlie and Jack are brothers.

=== Johnstone ===
- Norm Johnstone
- Travis Johnstone

Norm is the grandfather of Travis.

=== Jones (1) ===
- Brett Jones
- Chad Jones

Brett is the elder brother of Chad.

=== Jones (2) ===
- Nathan Jones
- Zak Jones

Nathan is the elder brother of Zak.

=== Jones (3) ===
- Bob Jones
  - Liam Jones

Bob is Liam's father.

== K ==
=== Kappler ===
- Darren Kappler
- David Kappler

Darren and David are brothers.

=== Kearney ===
- Dan Kearney
- Jim Kearney

Jim was the father of Dan.

=== Keating ===
- Aaron Keating
- Clark Keating

Aaron and Clark are brothers.

=== Keeffe ===
- Lachlan Keeffe
- Jessy Keeffe

Lachlan is the elder brother of Jessy.

=== Kekovich ===
- Brian Kekovich
- Sam Kekovich

Brian and Sam are brothers.

=== Kellaway ===
- Andrew Kellaway
- Duncan Kellaway

Andrew and Duncan are brothers.

=== Kelly ===
- Bill Kelly
- Joe Kelly

Bill was the father of Joe.

=== Kelly (2) ===
- Ernie Kelly
- Harvey Kelly
- Otto Kelly

All three were brothers

=== Kelly (3) ===
- Craig Kelly
  - Jake Kelly
  - Will Kelly

Craig is the father of Jake and Will.

=== Kelly (4) ===
- Phil Kelly
  - Josh Kelly
- Lance Kelly

Phil and Lance are brothers. Phil is the father of Josh.

=== Kelly (5) ===
- Grace Kelly (Adelaide)
- Niamh Kelly (Adelaide)

Grace and Niamh are sisters.

=== Kennedy (1) ===
- John Kennedy Sr.
- John Kennedy Jr.
- Josh Kennedy

John Sr. is John Jr.'s father, Josh is John Jr.'s son and his maternal grandfather is Felix Russo.

=== Kennedy (2) ===
- Des Kennedy
- Matthew Kennedy

Des is the father of Matthew.

=== Kennedy (3) ===
- James Kennedy
- Ted Kennedy

Ted was the elder brother of James

=== Kenny ===
- Bill Kenny
- Billy Kenny

Billy was the father of Bill.

=== Kernahan ===
- David Kernahan
- Harry Kernahan
- Stephen Kernahan

Harry is the father of David and Stephen.

=== Kerr (1) ===
- Laurie Kerr
- Peter Kerr

Laurie is the father of Peter.

=== Kerr (2) ===
- Daniel Kerr
- Roger Kerr

Roger is the father of Daniel.

=== Kerr (3) ===
- Alex Kerr
- Bill Kerr

Alex and Bill were brothers.

=== Kick ===
- Murray Kick
- Ned Kick

Ned was the father of Murray.

=== Kickett ===
- Dale Kickett
- Derek Kickett

Derek is Dale's uncle. Their extended family includes many other AFL footballers; Derek is also an uncle of Lance "Buddy" Franklin, Byron Pickett and Jarrod Garlett, as well as a cousin of Nicky Winmar.

=== King (1) ===
- Clinton King
- Derek King

Derek was the father of Clinton. Derek's father Robert King played for Brighton in the VFA.

=== King (2) ===
- Ben King
- Max King

Ben and Max are identical twin brothers.

=== Kinnear ===
- Bill Kinnear
- Joe Kinnear

Joe was the elder brother of Bill. The son of Joe, Col Kinnear, coached the Sydney Swans.

=== Klomp ===
- Kim Klomp (North Adelaide & Sturt)
- Robbert Klomp

Kim and Robbert are brothers.

=== Knight ===
- Graham Knight
- Phillip Knight

Graham is the father of Philip.

=== Knott ===
- Dan Knott (Collingwood & Richmond)
- Arch Knott (Fitzroy & St Kilda)

Dan and Arch were brothers.

=== Kol ===
- Michael Kol
- Nigel Kol (Geelong, Melbourne)

Michael and Nigel are identical twins.

=== Krakouer ===
- Andrew J. Krakouer
- Andrew L. Krakouer
- Jim Krakouer
- Nathan Krakouer
- Phil Krakouer

Jim, Phil and Andrew L. are brothers, Andrew J is Jim's son. Nathan is a cousin of Andrew J.

=== Kruse ===
- Max Kruse, Sr. (Prahran)
- Max Kruse, Jr. (Sydney Swans), (Glenelg)

Max Sr. is the father of Max Jr.

=== Kuhl ===
- Harry Kuhl
- Jim Kuhl

Harry was the father of Jim.

== L ==
=== Laird ===
- Chris Laird
- Frank Laird

Chris and Frank were twin brothers.

=== Lamb ===
- Tom Lamb (West Coast)
- Wayne Lamb (Fitzroy, Melbourne)

Wayne is Tom's father.

=== Lane ===
- Eddie Lane
- Clarrie Lane

Eddie was the elder brother of Clarrie.

=== Lambert ===
- Chris Lambert
- Harold Lambert

Chris was the elder brother of Harold

=== Langdon ===
- Ed Langdon
- Tom Langdon

Tom is the elder brother of Ed They are also related to the Cordner family. Their great-grandmother was Sylvia Cordner, a first cousin of Edward Rae, Harry, Larry and Alan Cordner, making Tom and Ed their first cousins thrice-removed.

=== Langford ===
- Chris Langford
- Will Langford
- Lachlan Langford

Chris is the father of Will and Lachlan.

=== Lappin ===
- Matthew Lappin (St Kilda & Carlton)
- Sunny Lappin (Gold Coast)

Matthew is the father of Sunny.

=== Laurie ===
- Jesse Laurie (Port Adelaide rookie, Claremont)
- Parris Laurie

Jesse and Parris are siblings.

=== Lawrence ===
- Barry Lawrence
- Steven Lawrence

Barry is the father of Steven.

=== Leach ===
- Arthur Leach
- Fred Leach
- Ted Leach

Arthur, Fred and Ted were brothers.

=== Leahy ===
- Brian Leahy
- John Leahy
- Terry Leahy

Brian, John and Terry are all brothers.

=== LeCras ===
- Peter LeCras
- Brent LeCras
- Mark LeCras

Peter (East Fremantle) is the father of Brent and Mark.

=== Leehane ===
- Steve Leehane
- Ted Leehane
- Tom Leehane

Steve was the father of Ted and Tom.

=== Le Messurrier ===
- Alfred Le Messurrier
- Albert Le Messurrier
- Alfred Roy Le Messurier
- Edward Le Messurrier
- Ernest Le Messurrier

The Le Messurrier's were a prominent Port Adelaide business family that played a large part in the early years of the Port Adelaide Football Club.

=== Lenaghan ===
- Denis Lenaghan
- Mick Lenaghan

Denis is the elder brother of Mick.

=== Lester-Smith ===
- Neil Lester-Smith
- Rod Lester-Smith
- Ryan Lester-Smith

Rod and Neil are brothers, Ryan is Neil's son. All have played for East Fremantle.

=== Lewis ===
- Irwin Lewis (Claremont)
  - Clayton Lewis (Claremont, East Perth)
  - Cameron Lewis (Claremont)
  - Chris Lewis (Claremont, West Coast)

Irwin Lewis is the father of Clayton, Cameron, and Chris.

=== Liberatore ===
- Tony Liberatore
  - Tom Liberatore

Tony is the father of Tom.

=== Lill ===
- Alick Lill
- John Lill

Alick was the father of John.

=== Linton ===
- Alby "Curly" Linton
- Alby Linton

Alby Sr. is the father of Alby.

=== Lisle/Milnes ===
- Brian Milnes
- Mark Lisle
- Jordan Lisle

Brian is the grandfather of Jordan, and Mark is the father of Jordan.

=== Lloyd ===
- Brad Lloyd
- John Lloyd
- Matthew Lloyd

John is the father of Brad and Matthew.

=== Lockwood ===
- George Lockwood
- Teddy Lockwood

George and Teddy were twin brothers

=== Long ===
- Michael Long
  - Jake Long

Michael is the father of Jake.

=== Longmire ===
- John Longmire
- Robert Longmire
- Keith Williams

Keith Williams is the grandfather of John Longmire. Robert is the uncle of John.

=== Longmuir ===
- Justin Longmuir
- Troy Longmuir

Justin and Troy are brothers

=== Lonie ===
- Nathan Lonie
- Ryan Lonie

Nathan and Ryan are identical twins

=== Lord (1) ===
- Alistair Lord
  - Ollie Lord
- Stewart Lord

Alistair and Stewart are twin brothers. Ollie is the grandson of Alistair.

=== Lord (2) ===
- Jack Lord
- John Lord

Jack was the father of John.

=== Lower ===
- Ed Lower
- Nick Lower

Ed and Nick are twins.

=== Lucas (1) ===
- George Lucas
- Peter Lucas

George was the father of Peter.

=== Lucas (2) ===
- Jack Lucas
- Kane Lucas

Jack is the father of Kane.

=== Lucas (3) ===
- Bert Lucas (Carlton, South Melbourne)
- George Lucas (South Melbourne)

Bert and George were brothers.

=== Luff ===
- Bill Luff Sr.
- Bill Luff

Bill Sr. was the father of Bill.

=== Lunn ===
- Ron Lunn
- Stephen Lunn

Ron is the father of Stephen.

=== Lugg ===
- Gary Lugg
- Rheanne Lugg

Gary is the father of Rheanne.

=== Lynch (1) ===
- Fred Lynch
- Paul Lynch

Fred is the father of Paul.

=== Lynch (2) ===
- Beth Lynch
- Tom Lynch

Tom is Beth's brother.

=== Lyon (1) ===
- Garry Lyon
- Peter Lyon

Peter is the father of Garry.

=== Lyon (2) ===
- Maurie Lyon
- Ross Lyon

Maurie is the father of Ross.

=== Lyons ===
- Marty Lyons
  - Jarryd Lyons
  - Corey Lyons

Marty is the father of Jarryd and Corey.

== M ==
=== Mackie ===
- Gordon Mackie
- Ken Mackie

Gordon was the elder brother of Ken.

=== McEntee ===
- Jed McEntee
- Kobe McEntee (Sturt)

Jed and Kobe are brothers.

=== MacPherson ===
- Rod MacPherson
- Stephen MacPherson
  - Darcy MacPherson

Rod is the elder brother of Stephen. Darcy is Stephen's son.

=== Macrae ===
- Jack Macrae
- Finlay Macrae

Finlay and Jack are brothers.

=== Madden ===
- Justin Madden
- Simon Madden

Justin and Simon are brothers.

=== Magin ===
- Alik Magin
- Rhys Magin

Alik is the younger brother of Rhys.

=== Maginness ===
- Norm Maginness
- Scott Maginness
- Finn Maginness

Norm is the father of Scott and Scott is the father of Finn.

=== Mahney ===
- Graham Mahney (Port Adelaide)
- Wayne Mahney (Port Adelaide)

Graham is Wayne's father.

=== Malakellis ===
- Spiro Malakellis
- Tony Malakellis

Spiro is the elder brother of Tony.

=== Malone ===
- Jack Malone
- Joe Malone

Jack and Joe were brothers.

=== Mann ===
- Ken Mann
- Peter Mann

Ken is the father of Peter.

=== Manson ===
- James Manson
- Jim Manson

Jim was James's father.

=== Marchesi ===
- Gerald Marchesi
- Peter Marchesi
- Val Marchesi

Val was the father of Gerald and Peter.

=== Marsham ===
- Alan Marsham
- Harry Marsham

Harry was the father of Alan.

=== Martyn ===
- Bryan Martyn
- Mick Martyn

Bryan was the father of Mick.

=== Matera ===
- Peter Matera
- Phillip Matera
- Wally Matera
- Brandon Matera

Wally is the elder brother of Peter and Phillip. Brandon is Wally's son.

=== Matthews (1) ===
- Herbie Matthews
- Herb Matthews Jr.
- Herb Matthews Sr.
- Norm Matthews

Herb, Sr. was Herbie's father and Herb, Jr. was his son. Norm was the second son of Herb Sr.

=== Matthews (2) ===
- Kelvin Matthews
- Leigh Matthews

Kelvin and Leigh are brothers.

=== Matthews (3) ===
- Don Matthews
- Norm Matthews

Norm was the father of Don.

=== May ===
- Charlie May
- Wally May

Charlie was the father of Wally.

=== Maynard ===
- Brayden Maynard
- Corey Maynard
- Peter Maynard

Peter is the father of Brayden and Corey.

=== McAdam ===
- Adrian McAdam
- Gilbert McAdam
- Greg McAdam

Adrian, Gilbert and Greg are brothers.

=== McAdam/Johnson/Benning ===
- Shane McAdam
- Ash Johnson
- Roy Benning

Shane, Ash and Roy are brothers.

=== McAsey ===
- Alan McAsey
- Darren McAsey
- Fischer McAsey

Alan is the father of Darren.

=== McCabe ===
- Bill McCabe
- Bill McCabe Jr.

Bill was the father of Bill Jr.

=== McCarthy/Olle ===
- Bernie McCarthy
- Gavan McCarthy
- Shane McCarthy
  - John McCarthy
  - Matthew McCarthy
- Alan Olle

Shane is the father of John and Matthew. Bernie and Gavan are Shane's brothers. Alan was the grandfather of John and Matthew.

=== McCartin ===
- Matthew McCartin (Geelong)
- Paddy McCartin (St Kilda, Sydney)
- Tom McCartin (Sydney)

Matthew is the father of Paddy and Tom. Paddy is the older brother of Tom.

=== McDonald (1) ===
- Alex McDonald
- Anthony McDonald
- James McDonald

Alex, Anthony and James are brothers

=== McDonald (2) ===
- Edwin McDonald
- Arch McDonald
- Fen McDonald

Edwin, Arch, and Fen are brothers

=== McDonald (3) ===
- Tom McDonald
- Oscar McDonald

Tom is the older brother of Oscar.

=== McFarlane ===
- Alex McFarlane
- Bill McFarlane

Alex is the uncle of Bill.

=== McGhie ===
- Joe McGhie (Australian footballer)
- Robbie McGhie

Joe and Robbie ("Bones") are brothers.

=== McGovern ===
- Andrew McGovern
  - Jeremy McGovern
  - Mitch McGovern

Andrew is the father of Jeremy and Mitch.

=== McGrath (1) ===
- Ashley McGrath
- Cory McGrath
- Toby McGrath
- Marty McGrath
- Dion Woods

Ashley, Cory and Toby are brothers. Marty and Dion Woods are cousins of Ashley, Cory & Toby.

=== McGrath (2) ===
- Dennis McGrath
- Tim McGrath

Dennis is the father of Tim.

=== McGrath (3) ===
- Frank McGrath
- Shane McGrath

Frank and Shane were brothers.

=== McGuinness ===
- Phil McGuinness
- Tony McGuinness

Phil and Tony are brothers.

=== McHale ===
- Jock McHale
- John McHale

Jock was the father of John.

=== McIntosh ===
- Ashley McIntosh
- John McIntosh

John is the father of Ashley.

=== McKay (1) ===
- Abbie McKay (Carlton)
- Andrew McKay (Carlton & Glenelg)
- Sophie McKay (Carlton)

Andrew is the father of Abbie and Sophie.

=== McKay (2) ===
- Ben McKay
- Harry McKay

Ben and Harry are identical twin brothers.

=== McKenzie (1) ===
- Bob McKenzie
- Robert McKenzie

Bob is the father of Robert.

=== McKenzie (2) ===
- Jack McKenzie
- Jack McKenzie Jr.

Jack was the father of Jack Jr.

=== McKenzie (3) ===
- Alec McKenzie
- Jack McKenzie (Port Adelaide)
- Ken McKenzie

Alec, Jack and Ken were brothers.

=== McKernan ===
- Corey McKernan
- Shaun McKernan

Corey is the elder brother of Shaun.

=== McLaughlin ===
- Hugh J. McLaughlin
- Hugh E. McLaughlin

Hugh J. was the father of Hugh E.

=== McLean ===
- Brock McLean
- Ricky McLean
- Rod McLean

Rod was the father of Ricky and Ricky is the uncle of Brock.

=== McLeish ===
- John McLeish
- Maurie McLeish

Maurie was the father of John.

=== McNamara ===
- Bill McNamara
- Pat McNamara

Bill was the father of Pat.

=== McPartland ===
- Andy McPartland
- Leo McPartland

Andy and Leo were brothers.

=== McPharlin ===
- Ray McPharlin
- Luke McPharlin

Ray was the grandfather of Luke.

=== McShane ===
- Henry McShane
- Jim McShane
- Joe McShane

Henry, Jim and Joe were brothers. Additionally, three other brothers were leading players in Victoria prior to the commencement of the VFL.

=== McVeigh ===
- Jarrad McVeigh
- Mark McVeigh

Jarrad and Mark are brothers.

=== Mead ===
- Darren Mead
- Jackson Mead

Darren is Jackson's father.

=== Menzel ===
- Daniel Menzel
- Troy Menzel

Daniel is the older brother of Troy.

=== Merrington ===
- Andrew Merrington (Footscray)
- Gary Merrington (Carlton)

Gary is the father of Andrew.

=== Merrett ===
- Jackson Merrett
- Zach Merrett

Jackson and Zach are brothers.

=== Merryweather/Guthrie ===
- Andrew Merryweather
- Cameron Guthrie
- Zach Guthrie

Andrew is the father of Cameron and Zach.

=== Metherell ===
- Jack Metherell
- Len Metherell

Len was the elder brother of Jack.

=== Michael ===
- Clem Michael
- Stephen Michael

Stephen is Clem's father.

=== Middlemiss ===
- Glen Middlemiss
- Russell Middlemiss

Russell is the father of Glen.

=== Miers ===
- David Miers (Subiaco, Claremont)
- Gryan Miers (Geelong)

David is the father of Gryan.

=== Mihocek ===
- Brody Mihocek
- Jack Mihocek

Jack is the father of Brody.

=== Milburn ===
- Charlie Milburn
- Pat Milburn

Charlie was the father of Pat.

=== Miller (1) ===
- Allan Miller
  - Greg Miller

Alan is the father of Greg.

=== Miller (2) ===
- Brad Miller
- Neville Miller

Neville is the father of Brad.

=== Mills ===
- Bert Mills
- Arthur Mills

Bert and Arthur were brothers

=== Mitchell ===
- Barry Mitchell
  - Tom Mitchell

Barry is the father of Tom.

=== Mithen ===
- Kevin Mithen
- Laurie Mithen

Kevin and Laurie are brothers.

=== Molloy (1) ===
- Glenn Molloy
- Graham Molloy

Glenn is the son of Graham.

=== Molloy (2) ===
- Jarrod Molloy
- Shane Molloy
- Chloe Molloy

Shane is the father of Jarrod. Chloe Molloy is a niece of Jarrod Molloy

=== Moloney (1) ===
- Brian Moloney
  - Troy Moloney
    - Abbi Moloney

Brian is the father of Troy. Troy is the father of Abbi.

=== Moloney (2) ===
- George Moloney Jr.
- George Moloney Sr.
- Vin Moloney

George Sr. was the father of George Jr. and Vin.

=== Moncrieff ===
- Allan Moncrieff
  - Michael Moncrieff

Allan is the father of Michael.

=== Monohan ===
- Jack Monohan Sr.
  - Jack Monohan Jr.

Jack senior was the father of Jack junior.

=== Montgomery ===
- Allan Montgomery
- Bill Montgomery
  - Ken Montgomery

Bill was the brother of Allan and the father of Ken.

=== Moody ===
- Breann Moody
- Celine Moody

Breann and Celine are twins.

=== Mooney ===
- Jason Mooney
- Cameron Mooney

Jason is Cameron's elder brother.

=== Moore (1) ===
- Herbert Moore
  - Roy Moore

Herbert was the father of Roy.

=== Moore (2) ===
- Kelvin Moore
- Andrew Moore

Kelvin is the elder brother of Andrew

=== Moore (3) ===
- Peter Moore
  - Darcy Moore

Peter is the father of Darcy.

=== Morden ===
- Clem Morden
- Jim Morden
- Jack O'Rourke, Snr.
- Basil O'Rourke
- Jack O'Rourke

Clem and Jim were brother. Jack O'Rourke, Snr. was married to their sister, and Basil and Jack were their nephews.

=== Moriarty ===
- Dan Moriarty
- Geoff Moriarty
  - Jack Moriarty

Geoff and Dan were brothers and Geoff was the father of Jack.

=== Morris ===
- Kevin Morris
- Steven Morris

=== Morrison ===
- Peter Morrison
- Shane Morrison

Peter is the father of Shane.

=== Morrissey ===
- George Morrissey
  - George Morrissey Jr.

George Sr. was the father of George.

=== Mort ===
- Harry Mort
  - Ian Mort

Harry was the father of Ian.

=== Morton ===
- Noel Morton
  - Cale Morton
  - Jarryd Morton
  - Mitch Morton

Noel played in the WAFL for Claremont and is the father of Mitch, Cale and Jarryd.

=== Morwood ===
- Paul Morwood
- Shane Morwood
- Tony Morwood

All three are brothers

=== Motley ===
- Geof Motley
  - Peter Motley

Geof is the father of Peter

=== Motlop ===
- Shannon Motlop
- Daniel Motlop
  - Jesse Motlop
- Steven Motlop

Daniel, Steven and Shannon are brothers. Jesse is the son of Daniel.

=== Mullenger ===
- Allan Mullenger
- Bobby Mullenger

Allan and Robert were brothers.

=== Muller ===
- Angie Muller
- Nick Muller

Angie and Nick were brothers.

=== Munday ===
- Jim Munday
- Jim Munday Sr.

Jim Sr. was the father of Jim.

=== Murdoch ===
- Brodie Murdoch
- Jordan Murdoch

Brodie and Jordan are brothers

=== Murphy (1) ===
- Frank Murphy
- Len Murphy

Frank and Len were brothers

=== Murphy (2) ===
- Leo Murphy
  - John Murphy
    - Marc Murphy

Leo was the father of John and grandfather of Marc.

=== Murphy (3) ===
- Jack Murphy
  - John P. Murphy

Jack was the father of John.

=== Murray (1) ===
- Dan Murray
  - Kevin Murray

Dan was the father of Kevin.

=== Murray (2) ===
- Sam Murray
- Nick Murray

Sam and Nick are brothers.

=== Murray (3) ===
- Allan Murray
- Derek Murray

Allan and Derek are brothers.

== N ==
=== Naismith ===
- Charlie Naismith
- Wally Naismith
  - Alby Naismith
  - Herb Naismith

Wally, twin brother of Charlie Naismith, was the father of Alby and Herb Naismth.

=== Nankervis (1) ===
- Bruce Nankervis
- Ian Nankervis

Bruce and Ian are brothers.

=== Nankervis (2) ===
- Stephen Nankervis
- Vic Nankervis

Stephen was the father of Vic.

=== Narkle ===
- Keith Narkle
- Phil Narkle

Keith is the elder brother of Phil.

=== Nash ===
- Thomas Nash
- Michael Nash
  - Robert Nash
    - Laurie Nash
    - Robert Nash Jr.

Robert was the father of Laurie and Robert Jr. Michael was Robert's father and Thomas's brother.

=== Neagle ===
- Merv Neagle
  - Jay Neagle

Merv was the father of Jay.

=== Negri ===
- Des Negri
- Frank Negri

Des and Frank were brothers.

=== Nelson ===
- Sandy Nelson (Sturt)
  - Ben Nelson

Sandy is the father of Ben.

=== Nicholls ===
- Geoff Nicholls
- Reg Nicholls

Geoff was the elder brother of Reg.

=== Nisbet ===
- Darryl Nisbet
- Des Nisbet

Des was the father of Darryl.

=== Niven ===
- Colin Niven
- Ray Niven

Colin and Ray were brothers.

=== Noble ===
- David Noble
  - John Noble

David is the father of John.

=== Nolan ===
- Bernie Nolan
- Herb Nolan
- Jerry Nolan
- Tom Nolan

Bernard, Herb, Jerry and Tom were brothers.

== O ==
=== Oaten ===
- Max Oaten
- Michael Oaten

Max is the father of Michael.

=== Oatey ===
- Jack Oatey
  - Peter Oatey
  - Robert Oatey
    - David Oatey

Jack was the father of Peter and Robert. David is the son of Robert

=== Oborne ===
- Brad Oborne
- Rod Oborne

Rod is the father of Brad.

=== O'Brien (1) ===
- Dally O'Brien
- Jock O'Brien

Jock was the elder brother of Dally.

=== O'Brien (2) ===
- Craig O'Brien
- Ron O'Brien

Ron is the father of Craig.

=== Obst ===
- Ken Obst
  - Peter Obst
    - Andrew Obst
  - Trevor Obst
      - Brad Ebert

Ken was the father of Trevor and Peter and the grandfather of Andrew. Brad Ebert is the grandson of Trevor Obst.

=== O'Connell ===
- David O'Connell
- John O'Connell
- Michael O'Connell

John is the father of David and Michael.

=== O'Donnell (1) ===
- Gary O'Donnell
- Graeme O'Donnell

Graeme is the father of Gary.

=== O'Donnell (2) ===
- Kevin O'Donnell
- Simon O'Donnell

Kevin is the father of Simon.

=== O'Driscoll ===
- Emma O'Driscoll
- Nathan O'Driscoll

Emma and Nathan are siblings.

=== Ogden ===
- Gordon Ogden
- Percy Ogden
- Terry Ogden

Percy was the father of Gordon and Terry.

=== O'Halloran ===
- Eddie O'Halloran
- Kevin O'Halloran

Kevin was the father of Eddie.

=== O'Hara ===
- Frank O'Hara
- Jack O'Hara
- Jim O'Hara

Frank, Jack and Jim were brothers.

=== O'Loughlin ===
- Michael O'Loughlin
- Ricky O'Loughlin

Michael and Ricky are brothers.

=== Oppy ===
- Grant Oppy
- Max Oppy

Max was the father of Grant.

=== O'Rourke (1) ===
- Jack O'Rourke, Snr.
- Clem Morden
- Jim Morden
- Basil O'Rourke
- Jack O'Rourke

Jack O'Rourke, Snr. was the brother-in-law of Clem and Jim Morden, and the father of Basil and Jack (who were, also, the nephews of Clem and Jim Morden).

=== O'Rourke (2) ===
- Bryde O'Rourke
- Ray O'Rourke

Ray is Bryde's father.

=== Osborne ===
- Graham Osborne
- Richard Osborne

Richard is the elder brother of Graham.

=== O'Sullivan ===
- Gabby O'Sullivan (Fremantle)
- John O'Sullivan (East Fremantle and Central District)

John is Gabby's father.

=== Ottens ===
- Brad Ottens
- Dean Ottens
- Luke Ottens

Dean is the father of Brad and Luke.

=== Outen ===
- Alby Outen
- Alby Outen Jr.
- Matt Outen
- Wyn Outen

Alby, Matt, and Wyn were brothers; and Alby was the father of Alby Jr.

== P ==
=== Pagan ===
- Denis Pagan
- Ryan Pagan

Denis is the father of Ryan.

=== Palfreyman ===
- Brent Palfreyman (Sandy Bay)
- Stewart Palfreyman (Geelong, Sandy Bay)

Brent and Stewart are brothers.

=== Pannam ===
- Albert Pannam
- Alby Pannam
- Charlie E. Pannam
- Charlie H. Pannam

Charlie H. Pannam and Albert Pannam were brothers. Charlie was also the father of Alby and Charlie E and the grandfather of Lou and Ron Richards.

=== Papley/Ross ===
- Max Papley (South Melbourne)
- Tom Papley (Sydney)
- Ben Ross (North Melbourne, Hawthorn)
- Michael Ross (Essendon)

Max Papley is the grandfather of Tom Papley and also grandfather to brothers Ben and Michael Ross.

=== Parker ===
- Daniel Parker
- Shane Parker

Shane and Daniel are brothers.

=== Pascoe ===
- Barry Pascoe
- Bob Pascoe

Bob is the elder brother of Barry

=== Paternoster ===
- Jim Paternoster
- Matt Paternoster (Fitzroy)

Jim and Matt were brothers.

=== Patterson ===
- Stephen Patterson (Collingwood & Norwood)
- Violet Patterson (Collingwood)

Stephen is Violet's father.

=== Pattinson ===
- Artie Pattinson
- George Pattinson

Artie was the father of George.

=== Pattison ===
- Andy Pattison
- Frank Pattison

Andy was the father of Frank.

=== Pavlich ===
- Matthew Pavlich (Fremantle, Woodville-West Torrens)
- Steven Pavlich (West Torrens)

Steven is the father of Matthew.

=== Peake ===
- Brett Peake
- Brian Peake

Brian is the father of Brett.

=== Pender ===
- Dan Pender
- Jim Pender
- Laurie Pender
- Mick Pender

Dan, Jim, Laurie and Mick were brothers.

=== Pert ===
- Brian Pert
- Gary Pert

Brian is the father of Gary.

=== Phillipou ===
- Peter Phillipou
  - Sam Phillipou
    - Mattaes Phillipou

Peter is the father of Sam, who is the father of Mattaes.

=== Phillips (1) ===
- Garry Phillips
- Ken Phillips

Ken is the father of Garry.

=== Phillips (2) ===
- Greg Phillips
- Erin Phillips
- Neville Phillips

Erin is Greg's daughter. Neville is Greg's cousin.

Shaun Burgoyne is the son-in-law of Greg and brother-in-law of Erin

=== Phillips (3) ===
- Ed Phillips
- Tom Phillips

Tom is the older brother of Ed.

=== Picken ===
- Billy Picken
- Liam Picken
- Marcus Picken

Billy is the father of Liam and Marcus.

=== Pickering ===
- Liam Pickering
- Michael Pickering

Michael was the father of Liam.

=== Pickett ===
- Byron Pickett
- Kysaiah Pickett
- Marlion Pickett
- Latrelle Pickett

Byron is Kysaiah's uncle. Byron's cousin is Marlion's father. Latrelle is Kysaiah's cousin, Byron's nephew and second cousin to Marlion.

=== Pirrie ===
- Dick Pirrie
- Richard Pirrie
- Kevin Pirrie
- Stephen Pirrie

Richard was the father of Dick and Kevin and the grandfather of Stephen.

=== Pitura ===
- John Pitura
- Mark Pitura

John is the father of Mark.

=== Polak ===
- Graham Polak
- Troy Polak

Troy is the elder brother of Graham.

=== Polkinghorne ===
- David Polkinghorne (Hawthorn)
- James Polkinghorne (Brisbane Lions, Essendon)
- Robert Polkinghorne (Hawthorn)

Robert is the brother of David and father of James.

=== Poulter ===
- Joe Poulter
- Ray Poulter

Joe was the father of Ray.

=== Powell ===
- Matthew Powell (Australian footballer)
- Tom Powell (footballer)

Matthew is the father of Tom.

=== Power ===
- Luke Power
- Sam Power

Luke is the elder brother of Sam.

=== Pratt ===
- Bob Pratt
- Bob Pratt Jr.

Bob was the father of Bob Jr.

=== Prescott ===
- Ashley Prescott
- David Prescott

David is the father of Ashley.

=== Price ===
- Joe Price
- Noel Price

Joe was the father of Noel.

=== Prior ===
- Jaxon Prior
- Michael Prior

Michael is the father of Jaxon.

=== Purdy ===
- Harry Purdy
- Harry F. Purdy

Harry was the father of Harry F.

=== Pyke ===
- Don Pyke
- Frank Pyke
- James Pyke

Don and James are the sons of former WAFL player Frank

== Q ==
=== Quinn (1) ===
- Bob Quinn Port Adelaide
- George Quinn Port Adelaide
- Jack Quinn Jnr Port Adelaide
- John Quinn Sr. Port Adelaide
- Tommy Quinn Geelong and Port Adelaide
- John Sidoli Port Adelaide

John Sr. was the father of Bob, Tommy, Jack and George. John Sidoli was John Sr's uncle and Bob, George, Jack and Tommy's great-uncle.

=== Quinn (2) ===
- Billy Quinn
- Roy Quinn

Billy was the father of Roy.

== R ==
=== Raines ===
- Andrew Raines
- Geoff Raines

Geoff is Andrew's father.

=== Ralphsmith ===
- Hugo Ralphsmith (Richmond)
- Sean Ralphsmith (Hawthorn, St Kilda)

Sean is Hugo's father.

=== Ramshaw ===
- Darrin Ramshaw
- Graham Ramshaw

Graham was Darrin's father.

=== Rance ===
- Alex Rance
- Murray Rance

Murray is the father of Alex.

=== Randall (1) ===
- Pepa Randall
- Trevor Randall
- Viv Randall

Viv was the father of Trevor, Trevor is the grandfather of Pepa.

=== Randall (2) ===
- Chelsea Randall
- Marijana Randall

Chelsea and Marijana are married.

=== Rankin ===
- Bert Rankin
- Cliff Rankin
- Doug Rankin
- Georgie Rankin
- Teddy Rankin
- Tom Rankin

Teddy was the brother of Tom and father of Bert, Cliff and Doug, and the great-great-grandfather of Georgie. Teddy was the grandfather of Graeme O'Donnell and great-grandfather of Gary O'Donnell.

=== Rankine ===
- Izak Rankine (Adelaide, Gold Coast and West Adelaide)
- Matt Rankine (South Adelaide and West Adelaide)

Izak and Matt are brothers.

=== Rawle ===
- George Rawle
- Keith Rawle

George was the father of Keith.

=== Rawlings ===
- Brady Rawlings
- Jade Rawlings

Brady and Jade are brothers.

=== Rayson ===
- Alan Rayson
- Arthur Rayson
- Noel Rayson

Arthur was the father of Alan and Noel.

=== Reedman ===
- Jack Reedman (North Adelaide and South Adelaide)
- Sid Reedman

Jack and Sid were brothers.

=== Reeves/Caddy ===
- John Reeves
- Michael Reeves
- Josh Caddy
- Ned Reeves

John was the father of Michael. Josh Caddy is John's grandson, as is Ned.

=== Reid (1) ===
- Bruce Reid Sr.
  - Bruce Reid Jr.
    - Ben Reid
    - Sam Reid
  - John Reid

Bruce Sr. was the father of Bruce and John. Bruce Jr. is the father of Ben and Sam

=== Reid (2) ===
- Zach Reid
- Archer Reid

Zach is Archer's older brother. Their grandfather Peter McRae played for Footscray.

=== Reiffel ===
- Lou Reiffel
- Ron Reiffel

Lou was the father of Ron.

=== Reilly ===
- Jack 'Corp' Reilly- 204 games for South Fremantle, captain and B&F winner, 11 state games for Western Australia
- Jim Reilly Played at Norwood during the 2nd world war
- Graeme Reilly - 132 games for South Fremantle, Captain, 1 premiership, 1 interstate game
- John Reilly Carlton, Footscray and South Fremantle

Jack and Jim are brothers. Graeme and John are sons of Jack.

=== Rendell ===
- Matthew Rendell (West Torrens, Fitzroy and Brisbane)
- Tim Rendell (West Torrens, Fitzroy and Caulfield)

Matthew and Tim are brothers.

=== Reynolds ===
- Dick Reynolds
- Joel Reynolds
- Les Reynolds
- Tom Reynolds

Dick and Tom were brothers and Joel is Dick's grandson. Les was the uncle of Dick. The Reynolds brothers had a cousin Max Oppy who also played league football.

=== Richards ===
- Lou Richards
- Ron Richards
- Ed Richards

Lou is the elder brother of Ron. Ed is Ron's grandson. Charlie Pannam was their grandfather.

=== Richardson (1) ===
- Alan Richardson
- Rodger Richardson
- Matthew Richardson

Alan and Rodger were brothers. Alan is the father of Matthew.

=== Richardson (2) ===
- Mark Richardson
- Max Richardson
- Wayne Richardson

Max and Wayne are brothers. Mark is Wayne's son.

=== Richardson (3) ===
- Mike Richardson
- Stephen Richardson

Mike and Stephen are twin brothers.

=== Rigoni ===
- Guy Rigoni
- Jemma Rigoni

Guy is Jemma's father.

=== Riley ===
- John Riley (Footscray, North Adelaide)
- Stephen Riley (North Adelaide)

John and Stephen are brothers.

=== Rioli ===
- Cyril Rioli
- Daniel Rioli
- Dean Rioli
- Maurice Rioli
- Maurice Rioli Jr
- Willie Rioli

Maurice is Maurice Jr's father, Dean, Cyril and Willie's uncle, and Daniel's great uncle. Dean's father Sebastian, Cyril's father Cyril and Willie's father Willie Snr (all Maurice's brothers) played in the West Australian Football League for South Fremantle. Cyril Rioli is also Michael Long's nephew.

=== Rippon ===
- Les Rippon
- Harold Rippon
- Norm Rippon

Les, Harold and Norm were brothers.

=== Roach ===
- Michael Roach
- Tom Roach

Michael is the father of Tom.

=== Robbins ===
- Ben Robbins
- Graham Robbins

Graham is the father of Ben.

=== Roberts (1) ===
- Michael Roberts
- Neil Roberts

Neil is the father of Michael.

=== Roberts (2) ===
- Ken E. Roberts
- Ken W. Roberts

Ken E. Roberts was the father of Ken W. Roberts.

=== Robertson (1) ===
- Austin Robertson Jr.
- Austin Robertson Sr.
- Harold Robertson

Austin Robertson junior is the son of Austin and the nephew of Harold.

=== Robertson (2) ===
- Keith Robertson
- Rohan Robertson
- Shane Robertson

Keith is the father of Rohan and Shane.

=== Robertson (3) ===
- Ben Robertson (Carlton)
- Meg Robertson (Carlton)

Ben is the father of Meg.

=== Robinson ===
- Alex Robinson
- Bill Robinson
- Fred Robinson
- Gordon Robinson

All four were brothers.

=== Robran ===
- Barrie Robran
  - Matthew Robran
  - Jonathon Robran
- Rodney Robran

Barrie is the elder brother to Rodney and the father of Matthew and Jonathan.

=== Rocca ===
- Anthony Rocca
- Saverio Rocca

Anthony and Saverio are brothers.

=== Rodan ===
- David Rodan
- Helen Roden

Helen is David's sister.

=== Rogers ===
- Dave Rogers
- Joe Rogers

Joe was the father of David.

=== Rollason ===
- Ken Rollason
- Neville Rollason

Neville was the father of Ken.

=== Rose ===
- Bill Rose
- Bob Rose
- Kevin Rose
- Ralph Rose
- Robert Rose

Bob was the father of Robert junior. He was also the elder brother of Bill, Kevin and Ralph.

=== Ross (1) ===
- Don Ross
- Paul Ross

Don is the father of Paul.

=== Ross (2) ===
- Jonathan Ross
- Lester Ross

Lester is the father of Jonathan.

=== Round ===
- Barry Round
- David Round

Barry is the father of David.

=== Rowbottom ===
- Charlie Rowbottom
- James Rowbottom

James is Charlie's older brother.

=== Rowe (1) ===
- Des Rowe
- Percy Rowe

Percy was the father of Des.

=== Rowe (2) ===
- James Rowe
- Stephen Rowe

Stephen is the father of James.

=== Rugolo ===
- Frank Rugolo
- Joe Rugolo

Frank and Joe are brothers.

=== Ruscuklic ===
- Alex Ruscuklic
- Peter Ruscuklic

Alex is the elder brother of Peter.

=== Rush ===
- Bob Rush
- Bryan Rush
- Gerald Rush
- Kevin Rush
- Leo Rush

The Rush's are all brothers; the only case of five brothers playing senior VFL/AFL football.

=== Russell (1) ===
- Ivan Russell
- Wally Russell

Wally was the father of Ivan.

=== Russell (2) ===
- Kym Russell
- Scott Russell

Kym is the elder brother of Scott

=== Russo ===
- Felix Russo
- Peter Russo

Felix is the father of Peter. Felix is also the grandfather of three players, Josh Kennedy, Luke Ball and Matthew Ball; as two of his daughters married footballers John Kennedy Jr. and Ray Ball.

=== Ryan ===
- Phil Ryan
- Ted Ryan

Phil was the elder brother of Ted.

=== Ryder ===
- Revis Ryder
  - Paddy Ryder

Revis is the father of Paddy.

== S ==
=== Sampson ===
- Brian Sampson
- Ray Sampson

Brian and Ray are brothers.

=== Sandford ===
- Ben Sandford
- Cecil Sandford
- George Sandford

The three were brothers.

=== Sawley ===
- Albert Sawley
- Gordon Sawley

Gordon was the elder brother of Albert.

=== Scanlan ===
- Joe Scanlan
- Pat Scanlan
- Kevin Scanlan

Joe and Pat were brothers and Pat was the father of Kevin.

=== Scarlett ===
- John Scarlett
- Matthew Scarlett

John is the father of Matthew.

=== Schache ===
- Laurence Schache
- Josh Schache

Laurence was the father of Josh.

=== Schimmelbusch ===
- Daryl Schimmelbusch
- Wayne Schimmelbusch

Daryl and Wayne are brothers.

=== Scholz ===
- Matilda Scholz (Port Adelaide)
- Poppy Scholz (Carlton)

Matilda and Poppy are sisters.

=== Schwarze ===
- Ben Schwarze
- Troy Schwarze

Troy is the elder brother of Ben.

=== Scott (1) ===
- Brad Scott
- Chris Scott

Bradley and Chris are identical twins.

=== Scott (2) ===
- Robert Scott
  - Bailey Scott

Robert is the father of Bailey.

=== Searl ===
- Doug Searl
- Sid Searl

Sid was the father of Doug.

=== Selleck ===
- Roy Selleck Sr.
- Roy Selleck

Roy Sr. was the father of Roy.

=== Selwood ===
- Adam Selwood
- Joel Selwood
- Scott Selwood
- Troy Selwood

All four were brothers (Adam and Troy were twins).

=== Serafini ===
- Laurie Serafini
- Renato Serafini

Renato is the elder brother of Laurie.

=== Serong ===
- Caleb Serong
- Jai Serong

Caleb is the older brother of Jai.

=== Sexton (1) ===
- Ben Sexton
- Michael Sexton

Michael is the elder brother of Ben.

=== Sexton (2) ===
- Damian Sexton
- Gerry Sexton

Gerry was the father of Damian.

=== Sharp ===
- Alf Sharp
- Mickey Sharp

Alf was the father of Mickey.

=== Shaw ===
- Brayden Shaw
- Heath Shaw
- Neville Shaw
- Ray Shaw
- Reg Shaw
- Rhyce Shaw
- Robert Shaw
- Tony Shaw
- Kelvin Shaw

Reg was the father of Kelvin, Ray, Tony and Neville. Ray is the father of Heath and Rhyce. Brayden, the son of Tony, was drafted by Collingwood but never made his AFL debut. Robert is the cousin of Kelvin, Ray, Tony and Neville (his father is the brother of Reg).

=== Shea ===
- Mark Shea
- Paddy Shea

Mark was the elder brother of Paddy.

=== Sheahan (1) ===
- John Sheahan
- Maurie Sheahan

Maurie was the father of John.

=== Sheahan (2) ===
- Fred Sheahan
- Gerald Sheahan

Fred and Gerald were brothers.

=== Sheldon ===
- Ken Sheldon
- Sam Sheldon

Ken is the father of Sam.

=== Shelton (1) ===
- Ian Shelton
- Bill Shelton
- Jack Shelton

Jack was the father of Bill and the uncle of Ian. Ian and Bill are cousins.

=== Shelton (2) ===
- Jim Shelton
- John Shelton

Jim was the father of John.

=== Shephard ===
- Graeme Shephard
- Heath Shephard

Graeme is the father of Heath.

=== Shinners ===
- Brian Shinners
- Kevin Shinners
- Georgia Gee

Brian and Kevin are brothers. Georgia is Brian's granddaughter.

=== Sholl ===
- Brad Sholl
- Craig Sholl
- Brett Sholl
  - Lachlan Sholl

Craig and Brad are brothers. Brett is the first cousin of Craig and Brad. Lachlan is Brett's son.

=== Sidebottom ===
- Allan Sidebottom
- Garry Sidebottom
- Beau McDonald

Garry is the elder brother of Allan, and the uncle of Beau McDonald.

=== Sierakowski ===
- Brian Sierakowski
- David Sierakowski
- Will Sierakowski

Brian is the father of David and uncle of Will.

=== Silvagni ===
- Sergio Silvagni
- Stephen Silvagni
- Alex Silvagni
- Jack Silvagni
- Ben Silvagni

Sergio is the father of Stephen. Alex is the son of Sergio's cousin Eric, and therefore Stephen's second cousin. Jack is the son of Stephen and the grandson of Sergio.

=== Simpkin ===
- Jonathan Simpkin
- Tom Simpkin

Jonathan is Tom's older brother.

=== Simpson ===
- Sean Simpson
  - Sam Simpson
  - Charlotte Simpson

Sean is the father of Sam and Charlotte

=== Sinclair ===
- Allan Sinclair
- Callum Sinclair

Allan is Callum's father.

=== Skilton ===
- Bob Skilton (Port Melbourne South Melbourne)
- Robert Skilton (Port Melbourne)

Robert was Bob's father.

=== Slattery ===
- Tyson Slattery (Essendon, West Adelaide)
- Wayne Slattery (North Adelaide South Adelaide St Kilda)

Wayne is the father of Tyson.

=== Sloane ===
- Rory Sloane
- Shae Sloane (Melbourne)

Rory is Shae's brother.

=== Smith (1) ===
- Len Smith
- Norm Smith
- Peter Smith

Norm was the younger brother of Len and the father of Peter.

=== Smith (2) ===
- Michael Smith
- Stan Smith

Stan is the father of Michael.

=== Smith (3) ===
- Jesse W. Smith
- Ross W. Smith

Jesse is the son of Ross.

=== Smith (4) ===
- Brad Smith
- Phil Smith

Phil is the father of Brad.

=== Smith (5) ===
- Mal Smith
- Nick Smith

Mal is the father of Nick.

=== Smith (6) ===
- Amy Smith
- Joel Smith
- Shaun Smith

Shaun is the father of Amy and Joel.

=== Smith (7) ===
- Clive Smith (North Melbourne)
- Max Smith (Essendon)

Clive and Max were brothers.

=== Somerville ===
- Trevor Somerville
- John Somerville
  - Peter Somerville

John and Trevor were brothers, and John was Peter's father.

=== Spargo ===
- Bob Spargo Sr
  - Bob Spargo jnr
    - Paul Spargo
      - Charlie Spargo
  - Ricky Spargo

Bob sr is the father of Bob Jr and Ricky. Bob Jr is the father of Paul. Paul is the father of Charlie

=== Sporn ===
- Garry Sporn (North Adelaide)
- Peter Sporn (North Adelaide)
- Trent Sporn (North Adelaide, Carlton)

Garry and Peter are brothers. Trent is Peter's son.

=== Standfield ===
- Bob Standfield
- Paul Standfield

Bob and Paul were brothers.

=== Stephenson ===
- Jack Stephenson
  - John F. Stephenson

Jack was the father of John.

=== Stevens (1) ===
- Gary Stevens
- Anthony Stevens
- Michael Stevens

Gary is Anthony's elder brother, Michael is the younger brother

=== Stevens (2) ===
- Danny Stevens
- Nick Stevens

Danny is the elder brother of Nick

=== Stevens/Talia ===
- Arthur Stevens
  - Harvey Stevens
    - Grandson: Daniel Talia
    - Grandson: Michael Talia

Arthur was the father of Harvey, Harvey is the grandfather of brothers Daniel and Michael.

=== Stewart (1) ===
- Craig Stewart
- James Stewart

Craig was the father of James.

=== Stewart (2) ===
- Ben Stewart (St Kilda)
- Ian Stewart (Richmond, St Kilda)

Ian is the father of Ben.

=== Stibbard ===
- Neville Stibbard Sr.
  - Neville Stibbard
  - Robert Stibbard

Neville Sr. is the father of Neville and Robert.

=== Stokes ===
- Jervis Stokes
- Ray Stokes

Ray is the elder brother of Jervis

=== Strang ===
- Bill Strang
    - Grandson: John Perry
  - Allan Strang
  - Colin Strang
  - Doug Strang
    - Geoff Strang
  - Gordon Strang

Bill was the father of Allan, Colin, Doug, Gordon, and Edna "Bob" Perry née Strang. Doug is the father of Geoff; Edna is the mother of John Perry.

=== Stringer ===
- Alan Stringer (Glenelg & North Adelaide)
- Barry Stringer (North Adelaide)
- Wayne Stringer (Glenelg & North Adelaide)

Alan, Barry and Wayne are brothers.

=== Strom ===
- Mim Strom
- Zac Strom (South Fremantle)
- Noah Strom (South Fremantle)
- Indi Strom

Mim, Zac, Noah & Indi are siblings.

=== Stynes ===
- Brian Stynes
- Jim Stynes

Brian is the younger brother of Jim.

=== Sullivan ===
- Tony Sullivan
  - Chris Sullivan

Tony is the father of Chris.

=== Sumner ===
- Byron Sumner
- Tim Sumner

Byron and Tim are brothers.

=== Svarc ===
- Cathy Svarc
- Ruby Svarc

Cathy and Ruby are sisters.

=== Swallow ===
- Andrew Swallow
- David Swallow

Andrew is the elder brother of David.

=== Swan ===
- Bill Swan
  - Dane Swan

Bill is Dane's father.

=== Sweet ===
- Eric Sweet
- Jack Sweet

Eric and Jack were brothers.

== T ==
=== Talia ===
- See Stevens/Talia

=== Tanner (1) ===
- Gerald Tanner (Richmond)
  - Xavier Tanner (North Melbourne, Melbourne)

Gerald is the father of Xavier.

=== Tanner (2) ===
- Grant Tanner (Geelong, Norwood)
- Wayne Tanner (Norwood)

Grant and Wayne are brothers.

=== Tarpey ===
- Andrew Tarpey
- Howard Tarpey

Andrew and Howard are brothers.

=== Tarrant ===
- Chris Tarrant
- Robbie Tarrant

Chris is the elder brother of Robbie.

=== Taylor (1) ===
- John Taylor Snr.
  - Don Taylor
  - John Taylor Jnr.
  - Laurie Taylor

John Taylor Snr. was the father of Don, John Jnr. and Laurie.

=== Taylor (2) ===
- Cliff "Beau" Taylor
- Jason Taylor
- Noel Taylor

Cliff was the father of Noel and the grandfather of Jason.

=== Thiessen ===
- Tony Thiessen
  - James Thiessen

Tony is the father of James.

=== Thomas (1) ===
- William Thomas
  - Len Thomas

William was the father of Len.

=== Thomas (2) ===
- William 'Digger' Thomas
  - Ritchie Thomas

Digger Thomas was the father of Ritchie.

=== Thomas (3) ===
- Jamie Thomas (Central Districts)
- Paul Thomas (Essendon, (Central Districts)

Jamie is the father of Paul.

=== Thripp ===
- Bill Thripp
  - Terry Thripp

Bill is the father of Terry.

=== Tippett ===
- Kurt Tippett
- Joel Tippett

Kurt and Joel are brothers

=== Tohill ===
- Anthony Tohill
- Anton Tohill

Anthony is Anton's father.

=== Toohey (1) ===
- Jim Toohey Sr.
  - Jack Toohey
  - Jim Toohey Jr.

Jim Sr. was the father of Jack and Jim Jr.

=== Toohey (2) ===
- Bernard Toohey
- Gerard Toohey

Bernard and Gerard are brothers.

=== Tossol ===
- John Tossol
- Peter Tossol

John and Peter are brothers.

=== Tredrea ===
- Gary Tredrea Collingwood
  - Warren Tredrea

Gary is the father of Warren.

=== Tribe ===
- George Tribe (Footscray)
- Tom Tribe (Footscray)

George and Tom were brothers.

=== Troughton ===
- Charlie Troughton (South Melbourne)
- Bob Troughton (Geelong)

Charlie and Bob were brothers.

=== Tuck ===
- Michael Tuck
  - Shane Tuck
  - Travis Tuck

Michael is the father of Shane and Travis. Nathan, Luke and Gary Ablett (Jr) are Travis and Shane's cousins.

=== Tuddenham ===
- Des Tuddenham
  - Paul Tuddenham

Des is the father of Paul.

=== Turner (1) ===
- Leo Turner
  - Michael Turner

Leo is the father of Michael.

=== Turner (2) ===
- Ken Turner
  - Jamie Turner

Ken is the father of Jamie.

=== Twomey ===
- Bill Twomey Sr.
  - Bill Twomey Jr.
  - Mick Twomey
  - Pat Twomey
    - David Twomey

Bill Sr. was the father of Bill, Mick and Pat the grandfather of David.

=== Tyson ===
- Charles, Snr. Tyson (East Fremantle)
  - Charlie Tyson (Collingwood, North Melbourne)
  - Edward Tyson (Prahran)
  - George Tyson (Perth, West Perth)
  - Jack Tyson (South Adelaide)
  - Sam Tyson (West Perth player and coach)
    - Ted Tyson (West Perth)

Charles Snr. was the father of Charlie, Edward, George, Jack and Sam. Ted was the son of Sam.

== U ==
=== Uwland ===
- Bodhi Uwland (Gold Coast)
- Zeke Uwland (Gold Coast)

Bodhi and Zeke are brothers.

== V ==
=== van Berlo ===
- Jay van Berlo (Fremantle)
- Nathan van Berlo (Adelaide)

Jay and Nathan are brothers.

=== Vickery ===
- John Vickery
- Ty Vickery

John is the father of Ty.

=== Vinar ===
- Eric Vinar (Fitzroy)
- Paul Vinar (Geelong)

Paul was the elder brother of Eric.

=== Viney ===
- Jay Viney (Melbourne)
- Todd Viney (Sturt, Melbourne)
  - Son: Jack Viney (Melbourne)

Todd is the elder brother of Jay and the father of Jack.

=== Voss ===
- Brett Voss (Brisbane Lions, St Kilda)
- Michael Voss (Brisbane Bears, Brisbane Lions)

Brett and Michael are brothers.

== W ==
=== Wagner ===
- Corey Wagner
- Josh Wagner

Josh and Corey are brothers.

=== Waite (1) ===
- Vin Waite
  - Jarrad Waite

Vin was the father of Jarrad.

=== Waite (2) ===
- Don Waite
- Merv Waite

Don and Merv were brothers.

=== Wakelin ===
- Darryl Wakelin (Collingwood, Port Adelaide & St Kilda)
- Finn Wakelin (Port Adelaide)
- Michael Wakelin (Central District)
- Shane Wakelin (Collingwood, Port Adelaide & St Kilda)

Darryl and Shane are identical twin brothers.

=== Wakfer ===
- Lauren Wakfer
- Zoe Wakfer

Lauren and Zoe are identical twin sisters.

=== Wales ===
- Lucy Wales
- Steph Wales

Lucy and Steph are twin sisters.

=== Walker (1) ===
- Bill Walker
  - Greg Walker

Bill is the father of Greg.

=== Walker (2) ===
- Daisy Walker
- Will Walker

Daisy and Will are siblings.

=== Wallis (1) ===
- Tom Wallis
  - Gary Wallis

Tom was the father of Gary.

=== Wallis (2) ===
- Stephen Wallis
  - Mitch Wallis

Stephen is the father of Mitch.

=== Wallis (3) ===
- Dean Wallis
  - Tom Wallis

Dean is the father of Tom.

=== Wanganeen ===
- Gavin Wanganeen
  - Tex Wanganeen
  - Nasiah Wanganeen-Milera

Gavin is the father of Tex.

Nasiah is the nephew of Gavin and cousin of Tex.

=== Warburton ===
- Keith Warburton
  - Peter Warburton

Keith was the father of Peter.

=== Ward ===
- Eric Ward
  - Geoff Ward

Eric was the father of Geoff.

=== Ware ===
- Norman Ware
- Wally Ware
  - Bob Ware

Wally was the brother of Norm and the father of Bob.

=== Warhurst ===
- Tom Warhurst Sr.
  - Tom Warhurst Jr.

Tom Sr. was the father of Tom Jr

=== Warner ===
- Chad Warner
- Corey Warner
- Travis Warner (South Fremantle)

Travis is Chad and Corey's father.

=== Warnock ===
- Matthew Warnock
- Robert Warnock

Matthew is Robert's elder brother.

=== Waterman ===
- Chris Waterman
  - Jake Waterman
  - Alec Waterman

Chris is the father of Alec and Jake

=== Waters ===
- Bryan Waters
- Terry Waters

Bryan is the elder brother of Terry

=== Watson ===
- Larry Watson
- Tim Watson
  - Jobe Watson

Tim is the father of Jobe and the brother of Larry.

=== Watt ===
- Rod Watt
- Rowley Watt

Rod and Rowley were brothers.

=== Way ===
- Jack Way
  - Alec Way

Jack was the father of Alec.

=== Wearmouth ===
- Dick Wearmouth
  - Ronnie Wearmouth

Dick was the father of Ronnie.

=== Wearne ===
- David Wearne
- Stephen Wearne

David and Stephen are brothers.

=== Weatherill ===
- George Weatherill
- Robert Weatherill

Robert was the elder brother of George.

=== Weideman ===
- Murray Weideman
  - Mark Weideman
    - Sam Weideman

Murray is the father of Mark, who is the father of Sam.

=== Weller ===
- Maverick Weller
- Lachie Weller

Maverick is the older brother of Lachie.

=== Wells ===
- Tom Wells
  - Tommy Wells

Tom was the father of Tommy.

=== Welsh (1) ===
- Bill Welsh
  - Peter Welsh

Bill was the father of Peter.

=== Welsh (2) ===
- Jack Welsh
  - Peter Welsh

Jack was the father of Peter.

=== West (1) ===
- Connor West
- Robbie West (West Perth, West Coast, Footscray & Port Adelaide)

Robbie is Connor's father.

=== West (2) ===
- Scott West
  - Rhylee West

Scott is Rhylee's father.

=== Western ===
- Joel Western
- Mikayla Western

Joel and Mikayla are siblings.

=== Westhoff ===
- Justin Westhoff
- Leigh Westhoff (Central District)
- Matthew Westhoff
- Nicholas Westhoff (Richmond rookie list, West Adelaide)

Leigh, Justin and Matthew are brothers. Nick is a cousin.

=== Wheelahan ===
- Danny Wheelahan (South Melbourne)
- Martin Wheelahan

Danny was Martin's older brother.

=== Wheeler ===
- Garry Wheeler
- Terry Wheeler
- Willie Wheeler (Williamstown)

Terry was Garry's older brother, Willie is their nephew.

=== Whelan ===
- Marcus Whelan
  - Shane Whelan

Marcus was the father of Shane.

=== Whitlock ===
- Matt Whitlock
- Jack Whitlock

Matt and Jack are twin brothers.

=== Whitnall ===
- Graeme Whitnall
  - Lance Whitnall

Graeme is Lance's father.

=== Whitten ===
- Ted Whitten
  - Ted Whitten jnr
- Don Whitten

Ted was the father of Ted Jr. and elder brother of Don.

=== Wiggins ===
- Patrick Wiggins
- Simon Wiggins

Patrick and Simon are brothers.

=== Williams (1) ===
- Fos Williams
  - Anthony Williams
  - Mark Williams
  - Stephen Williams

Fos was the father of Anthony, Mark and Stephen. Anthony and Mark were twins. Additionally Fos' brothers Alec, Frank and Glynn all played senior SANFL football while another brother, Thomas, played in the WAFL. Dylan Shiel is Mark's son-in-law.

=== Williams (2) ===
- Frank H. Williams
  - Frank P. Williams

Frank H. was the father of Frank P.

=== Williams (3) ===
- Billy Williams
- Rod Williams

Billy was the father of Rod.

=== Williams (4) ===
- Les Williams
  - Gary Williams

Les is the father of Gary.

=== Williams (5) ===
- John Williams
  - Mark Williams

John is the father of Mark.

=== Williams (6) ===
- Richard Williams
- Lyall Williams

Richard and Lyall were brothers.

=== Wilson (1) ===
- Arnie Wilson
  - Ron Wilson

Arnie was the father of Ron.

=== Wilson (2) ===
- Alf Wilson
- Percy Wilson

Alf and Percy were brothers.

=== Window ===
- Clarrie Window (Glenelg)
- Gary Window (Central District)
- Hunter Window (Glenelg)
- Peter Window (Central District & West Adelaide)
- Piper Window (Port Adelaide)

Clarrie was the father of Gary, grandfather of Peter and great-grandfather of Hunter and Piper.

=== Woewodin ===
- Shane Woewodin
  - Taj Woewodin

Shane is the father of Taj.

=== Woodfield ===
- Les Woodfield
- Clarrie Woodfield

Les was the elder brother of Clarrie.

=== Woolnough ===
- Michael Woolnough
  - Marc Woolnough

Michael is the father of Marc.

=== Worland ===
- Don Worland
- John Worland

Don is the elder brother of John.

=== Worle ===
- Len Worle (Essendon)
- Tommy Worle

Tommy is the older brother of Len.

=== Worsfold ===
- John Worsfold
- Peter Worsfold

John is the elder brother of Peter.

=== Wright ===
- John Wright
  - Michael Wright
  - Stephen Wright

Michael is the elder brother of Stephen, their father John played for Box Hill in the VFA.

=== Wynd ===
- Garrey Wynd
  - Paul Wynd
  - Scott Wynd

Garrey is the father of Paul and Scott.

== Y ==
=== Yates ===
- Percy Yates
- Stan Yates

Percy was the elder brother of Stan.

=== Yeates ===
- John Yeates (Geelong)
  - Mark Yeates (Geelong)

John is the father of Mark.

=== Young (1) ===
- Garry Young
- Maurie Young

Maurie was the elder brother of Garry.

=== Young (2) ===
- Lachie Young
- Hayden Young

Lachie is the elder brother of Hayden.

=== Youren ===
- George Youren (Collingwood, Northcote)
  - Colin Youren (Hawthorn)

George was the father of Colin.

== Z ==
=== Zantuck ===
- Shane Zantuck (North Melbourne, South Melbourne, Melbourne)
  - Ty Zantuck (Richmond, Essendon)

Shane is the father of Ty.

== See also ==
- List of professional sports families
- List of family relations in American football
  - List of second-generation National Football League players
- List of association football (soccer) families
  - List of African association football families
  - List of European association football families
    - List of English association football families
    - List of former Yugoslavia association football families
    - List of Scottish football families
    - List of Spanish association football families
  - Category:Association football families
- List of second-generation Major League Baseball players
- List of second-generation National Basketball Association players
- List of boxing families
- List of chess families
- List of International cricket families
- List of family relations in the National Hockey League
- List of family relations in rugby league
- List of international rugby union families
- List of professional wrestling families

== Sources ==
- Atkinson, G. (1982) Everything you ever wanted to know about Australian rules football but couldn't be bothered asking, The Five Mile Press: Melbourne. ISBN 0 86788 009 0.
- Blair, L. (2005) Immortals, John Wiley & Sons Australia: Milton, Qld. ISBN 1 74031 104 3.
- Collins, B. (2008). The Red Fox, The Biography of Norm Smith Legendary Melbourne Coach, Slattery Media: Melbourne. ISBN 9780992379148.
- Cullen, B. (2015) Harder than Football, Slattery Media Group: Melbourne. ISBN 9780992379148.
- Hillier, K. (2004) Like Father Like Son, Pennon Publishing: Melbourne. ISBN 1-877029-73-4.
- Piesse, K. (2010) The Bears Uncensored, Cricketbooks.com.au: Melbourne. ISBN 9780646528793.
- Sexton, M. (2021) "Playing for Fun", in 150: A Celebration, South Australian Cricket Association: Adelaide. ISBN 9780646838670.
