= Alwyn Johns =

Australian rules footballer

Personal information
- Full name: Alwyn Martin Johns
- Born: 17 March 1894; Geelong, Victoria
- Died: 14 September 1969 (aged 75); North Geelong, Victoria
- Original team: East Geelong
- Height: 178 cm (5 ft 10 in)
- Weight: 70 kg (154 lb)
- Position: Halfback

Playing career^{1}
Years	Club	Games (Goals)
1913–1915, 1917–1920	Geelong	80 (29)
- ^{1} Playing statistics correct to the end of 1920.

Alwyn Martin Johns (17 March 1894 – 14 September 1969) was an Australian rules footballer who played for the Geelong Football Club in the Victorian Football League (VFL).
