= Mark Alves =

Australian rules footballer

Personal information
- Full name: Mark Alves
- Born: 19 December 1956 (age 69)
- Original team: Edithvale-Aspendale
- Height: 180 cm (5 ft 11 in)
- Weight: 81.5 kg (180 lb)

Playing career^{1}
Years	Club	Games (Goals)
1977	Melbourne	4 (1)
- ^{1} Playing statistics correct to the end of 1977.

Mark Alves (born 19 December 1956) is a former Australian rules footballer who played with Melbourne in the Victorian Football League (VFL).

He is the younger brother of Stan Alves.
