= Jim Munday Sr. =

Australian rules footballer

Personal information
- Full name: James Joseph Munday
- Born: 7 July 1887; Geelong, Victoria
- Died: 27 May 1955 (aged 67); Melbourne, Victoria

Playing career^{1}
Years	Club	Games (Goals)
1904–06	Geelong	33 (1)
- ^{1} Playing statistics correct to the end of 1906.

James Joseph Munday Sr. (7 July 1887 – 27 May 1955) was an Australian rules footballer who played with Geelong in the Victorian Football League (VFL).
