= Charlie Troughton =

Australian rules footballer

Personal information
- Full name: Charlie Troughton
- Born: 24 July 1906
- Died: 20 January 1984 (aged 77)
- Original team: North Broken Hill
- Height: 168 cm (5 ft 6 in)
- Weight: 64 kg (141 lb)

Playing career^{1}
Years	Club	Games (Goals)
1930	South Melbourne	7 (6)
- ^{1} Playing statistics correct to the end of 1930.

Charlie Troughton (24 July 1906 – 20 January 1984) was an Australian rules footballer who played with South Melbourne in the Victorian Football League (VFL).
