= Norm Dean =

Australian rules footballer

Personal information
- Full name: Norm Dean
- Born: 13 March 1934 (age 92)
- Original team: State Savings Bank
- Height: 185 cm (6 ft 1 in)
- Weight: 97 kg (214 lb)

Playing career^{1}
Years	Club	Games (Goals)
1955–58	North Melbourne	30 (6)
- ^{1} Playing statistics correct to the end of 1958.

Norm Dean (born 13 March 1934) is a former Australian rules footballer who played with North Melbourne in the Victorian Football League (VFL).
