= Bill Huntington =

Australian rules footballer

Personal information
- Full name: William "Bill" Huntington
- Born: 11 August 1929
- Died: 18 December 2013 (aged 84)
- Original team: Coburg Juniors
- Height: 184 cm (6 ft 0 in)
- Weight: 78 kg (172 lb)

Playing career^{1}
Years	Club	Games (Goals)
1950–51	Carlton	3 (0)
- ^{1} Playing statistics correct to the end of 1951.

Bill Huntington (11 August 1929 – 18 December 2013) was an Australian rules footballer who played with Carlton in the Victorian Football League (VFL).
