= Glenn Boland =

Australian rules footballer

Personal information
- Full name: Glenn Boland
- Born: 4 July 1962 (age 64)
- Original team: Parkdale
- Height: 180 cm (5 ft 11 in)
- Weight: 76 kg (168 lb)

Playing career^{1}
Years	Club	Games (Goals)
1982–84	Melbourne	16 (1)
1985	St Kilda	3 (0)
Total		19 (1)
- ^{1} Playing statistics correct to the end of 1985.

Glenn Boland (born 4 July 1962) is a former Australian rules footballer who played with Melbourne and St Kilda in the Victorian Football League (VFL).
