= Ben Baxter =

Australian rules footballer

Personal information
- Full name: Benjamin Box Baxter
- Born: 13 November 1876; Frankston, Victoria
- Died: 30 January 1934 (aged 57); Frankston, Victoria
- Position: Defence / wing

Playing career^{1}
| Years | Club | Games (Goals) |
| 1902–1906 | Essendon | 67 (4) |
- ^{1} Playing statistics correct to the end of 1906.

Benjamin Box Baxter (13 November 1876 – 30 January 1934) was an Australian rules footballer who played for the Essendon Football Club in the Victorian Football League (VFL).

He was born Benjamin Baxter Box but changed his name to Benjamin Box Baxter when he was fostered by Benjamin Baxter, a magistrate in the Mornington/Hastings shire, following the death of his mother in 1891.
