= Graeme Aubrey =

Australian rules footballer

Personal information
- Born: 4 August 1948 (age 78)
- Original team: Bentleigh
- Height: 173 cm (5 ft 8 in)
- Weight: 62 kg (137 lb)

Playing career^{1}
Years	Club	Games (Goals)
1968	Melbourne	1 (2)
- ^{1} Playing statistics correct to the end of 1968.

Graeme Aubrey (born 4 August 1948) is a former Australian rules footballer who played with Melbourne in the Victorian Football League (VFL).
