= Alby Bendle =

Australian rules footballer

Personal information
- Full name: Albert Martin Bendle
- Born: 30 October 1893
- Died: 11 September 1967 (aged 73); Geelong, Victoria
- Original team: East Geelong

Playing career^{1}
Years	Club	Games (Goals)
1922	Geelong	13 (1)
- ^{1} Playing statistics correct to the end of 1922.

Albert Martin Bendle (30 October 1893 – 11 September 1967) was an Australian rules footballer who played for the Geelong Football Club in the Victorian Football League (VFL).
