= Rick Feldmann =

Australian rules footballer

Personal information
- Full name: Rick Feldmann
- Born: 27 November 1945 (age 80)
- Original team: Box Hill
- Height: 179 cm (5 ft 10 in)
- Weight: 77 kg (170 lb)

Playing career^{1}
| Years | Club | Games (Goals) |
| 1966–67 | Melbourne | 10 (2) |
- ^{1} Playing statistics correct to the end of 1967.

Rick Feldmann (born 27 November 1945) is a former Australian rules footballer who played with Melbourne in the Victorian Football League (VFL).
