= Derek Feldmann =

Australian rules footballer

Personal information
- Full name: Derek Feldmann
- Born: 6 October 1948 (age 78)
- Original team: Surrey Hills
- Height: 182 cm (6 ft 0 in)
- Weight: 74 kg (163 lb)
- Position: Flanker

Playing career^{1}
Years	Club	Games (Goals)
1967–70	Melbourne	41 (3)
1972	St Kilda	3 (0)
Total		44 (3)
- ^{1} Playing statistics correct to the end of 1972.

Derek Feldmann (born 6 October 1948) is a former Australian rules footballer who played with Melbourne and St Kilda in the Victorian Football League (VFL).
