= Joe Brophy =

Australian rules footballer

Personal information
- Full name: Joseph William Brophy
- Born: 5 April 1890; Carlton North, Victoria
- Died: 25 September 1972 (aged 82); Melbourne, Victoria
- Height: 175 cm (5 ft 9 in)

Playing career^{1}
Years	Club	Games (Goals)
1910	Fitzroy	2 (2)
- ^{1} Playing statistics correct to the end of 1910.

Joseph William Brophy (5 April 1890 – 25 September 1972) was an Australian rules footballer who played with Fitzroy in the Victorian Football League (VFL).
