= Ron O'Brien (footballer) =

Australian rules footballer

Personal information
- Born: 6 December 1942 (age 83)
- Original team: Essex Heights
- Height: 173 cm (5 ft 8 in)
- Weight: 67 kg (148 lb)

Playing career^{1}
| Years | Club | Games (Goals) |
| 1961 | Richmond | 1 (0) |
- ^{1} Playing statistics correct to the end of 1961.

Ron O'Brien (born 6 December 1942) is a former Australian rules footballer who played with Richmond in the Victorian Football League (VFL).
