= Bill Bedford (footballer) =

Australian rules footballer, born 1908

Personal information
- Full name: Bill Bedford
- Born: 19 February 1908
- Died: 4 November 1973 (aged 65)
- Original team: Port Melbourne
- Height: 178 cm (5 ft 10 in)
- Weight: 80 kg (176 lb)

Playing career^{1}
Years	Club	Games (Goals)
1934	Fitzroy	5 (5)
- ^{1} Playing statistics correct to the end of 1934.

Bill Bedford (19 February 1908 – 4 November 1973) was an Australian rules footballer who played with Fitzroy in the Victorian Football League (VFL).
