= Percy Yates =

Australian rules footballer

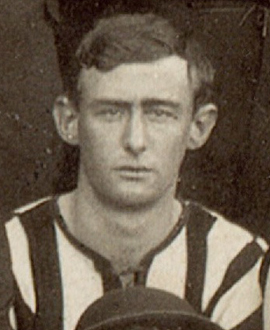
- Yates in 1916

Personal information
- Full name: Percival Charles Vivian Yates
- Born: 3 October 1894; Bendigo
- Died: 24 April 1976 (aged 81); Prahran, Victoria
- Original team: Balmain (VMFL)
- Height: 177 cm (5 ft 10 in)
- Weight: 78 kg (172 lb)

Playing career^{1}
Years	Club	Games (Goals)
1916	Collingwood	2 (0)
- ^{1} Playing statistics correct to the end of 1916.

Percy Yates (3 October 1894 – 24 April 1976) was a former Australian rules footballer who played with Collingwood in the Victorian Football League (VFL).
