= Tony Hill (Australian footballer) =

Australian rules footballer

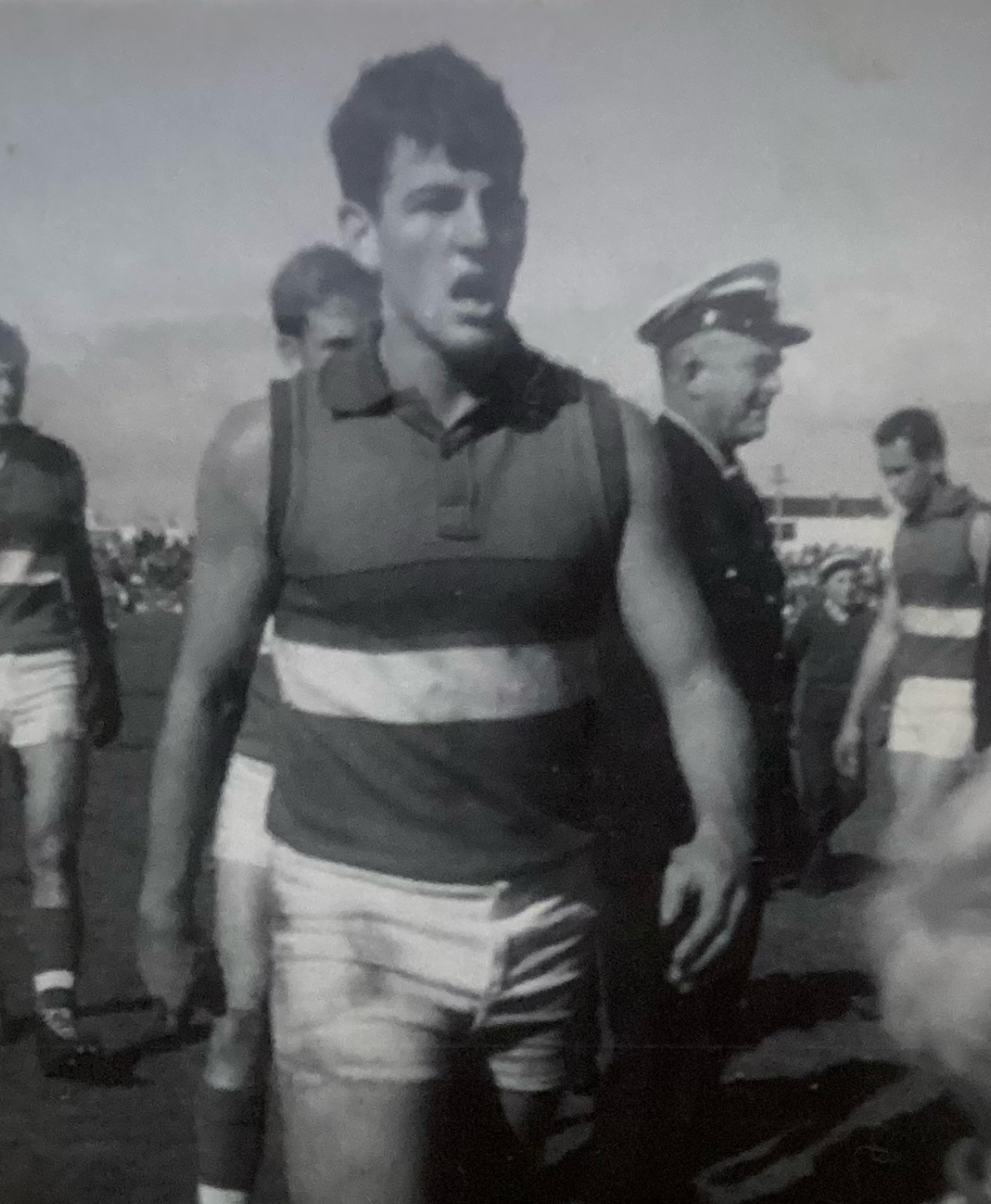
- Hill in 1968

Personal information
- Full name: Tony Hill
- Born: 6 August 1949 (age 77)
- Original team: West Footscray
- Height: 188 cm (6 ft 2 in)
- Weight: 98 kg (216 lb)

Playing career^{1}
Years	Club	Games (Goals)
1968	Footscray	1 (0)
- ^{1} Playing statistics correct to the end of 1968.

Tony Hill (born 6 August 1949) is a former Australian rules footballer who played with Footscray in the Victorian Football League (VFL).
