= Rob Foster =

Australian rules footballer

Personal information
- Full name: Rob Foster
- Born: 25 March 1947
- Died: 12 March 2014 (aged 66)
- Original team: St Pat's
- Height: 189 cm (6 ft 2 in)
- Weight: 84 kg (185 lb)

Playing career^{1}
Years	Club	Games (Goals)
1964–67	Melbourne	22 (7)
- ^{1} Playing statistics correct to the end of 1967.

Rob Foster (25 March 1947 – 12 March 2014) was an Australian rules footballer who played with Melbourne in the Victorian Football League (VFL).
