= Bob Aubrey =

Australian rules footballer

Personal information
- Full name: Robert James Aubrey
- Born: 14 November 1921; Bendigo, Victoria
- Died: 26 December 2015 (aged 94)
- Original team: Prahran
- Height: 174 cm (5 ft 9 in)
- Weight: 71 kg (157 lb)

Playing career^{1}
Years	Club	Games (Goals)
1945	Prahran (VFA)	4 (0)
1945	St Kilda	5 (0)
- ^{1} Playing statistics correct to the end of 1945.

Robert James Aubrey (14 November 1921 – 26 December 2015) was an Australian rules footballer who played with St Kilda in the Victorian Football League (VFL).

== Personal life ==
Aubrey served as a leading aircraftman in the Royal Australian Air Force during the Second World War.
