= Peter Hall (Australian footballer) =

Australian rules footballer

Personal information
- Full name: Peter Hall
- Born: 26 November 1957 (age 68)
- Original team: North Old Boys
- Height: 191 cm (6 ft 3 in)
- Weight: 85 kg (187 lb)

Playing career^{1}
Years	Club	Games (Goals)
1978–79	South Melbourne	5 (0)
- ^{1} Playing statistics correct to the end of 1979.

Peter Hall (born 26 November 1957) is a retired Australian rules footballer who played for South Melbourne in the Victorian Football League (VFL).
