= Reg Barnes =

Australian rules footballer

Personal information
- Full name: Reginald William Barnes
- Born: 15 December 1920; Hawthorn, Victoria
- Died: 6 August 1999 (aged 78)
- Original team: Auburn
- Height: 178 cm (5 ft 10 in)
- Weight: 76 kg (168 lb)

Playing career^{1}
Years	Club	Games (Goals)
1944–45	Hawthorn	6 (0)
- ^{1} Playing statistics correct to the end of 1945.

Reginald William Barnes (15 December 1920 – 6 August 1999) was an Australian rules footballer who played with Hawthorn in the Victorian Football League (VFL).
