= Ray Horkings =

Australian rules footballer

Personal information
- Full name: Ray Horkings
- Born: 4 May 1946 (age 80)
- Height: 170 cm (5 ft 7 in)
- Weight: 66 kg (146 lb)

Playing career^{1}
Years	Club	Games (Goals)
1967–68	Hawthorn	11 (5)
- ^{1} Playing statistics correct to the end of 1968.

Ray Horkings (born 4 May 1946) is a former Australian rules footballer who played with Hawthorn in the Victorian Football League (VFL).
