= Ross Gallagher =

Australian rules footballer

Personal information
- Full name: Ross Gallagher
- Born: 8 September 1956 (age 70)
- Original team: Assumption Old Boys
- Height: 168 cm (5 ft 6 in)
- Weight: 67 kg (148 lb)

Playing career^{1}
Years	Club	Games (Goals)
1975–76, 1981	Footscray	11 (4)
- ^{1} Playing statistics correct to the end of 1981.

Ross Gallagher (born 8 September 1956) is a former Australian rules footballer who played with Footscray in the Victorian Football League (VFL).
