= Bill Bendle =

Australian rules footballer

Personal information
- Full name: William Henry Bendle
- Born: 2 December 1897; Geelong, Victoria
- Died: 4 October 1959 (aged 61); Geelong, Victoria
- Original team: East Geelong
- Height: 170 cm (5 ft 7 in)
- Weight: 66 kg (146 lb)

Playing career^{1}
Years	Club	Games (Goals)
1918–19, 1921	Geelong	14 (6)
- ^{1} Playing statistics correct to the end of 1921.

William Henry Bendle (2 December 1897 – 4 October 1959) was an Australian rules footballer who played with Geelong in the Victorian Football League (VFL).
