= Pat Milburn =

Australian rules footballer

Personal information
- Full name: Patrick John Milburn
- Born: 12 May 1932
- Died: 17 November 2013 (aged 81); Perth, Western Australia
- Original team: Stanley (Tasmania)
- Height: 173 cm (5 ft 8 in)
- Weight: 79.5 kg (175 lb)

Playing career^{1}
Years	Club	Games (Goals)
1953	Collingwood	6 (3)
- ^{1} Playing statistics correct to the end of 1953.

Patrick John "Pat" Milburn (12 May 1932 – 17 November 2013) was an Australian rules footballer who played with Collingwood in the Victorian Football League (VFL).
