= Frank Pattison =

Australian rules footballer

Personal information
- Full name: Francis Xavier Pattison
- Born: 29 September 1928
- Died: 23 May 2025 (aged 96)
- Height: 183 cm (6 ft 0 in)
- Weight: 89 kg (196 lb)

Playing career^{1}
Years	Club	Games (Goals)
1951	St Kilda	4 (0)
- ^{1} Playing statistics correct to the end of 1951.

Francis Xavier Pattison (29 September 1928 – 23 May 2025) was an Australian rules footballer who played with St Kilda in the Victorian Football League (VFL).

Pattison was the son of former Carlton, Fitzroy and Richmond player Andy Pattison.
