= Peter Brain (footballer) =

Australian rules footballer

Personal information
- Full name: Peter Brain
- Born: 10 December 1944 (age 81)
- Original team: Glen Iris
- Height: 173 cm (5 ft 8 in)
- Weight: 73 kg (161 lb)

Playing career^{1}
Years	Club	Games (Goals)
1961	South Melbourne	1 (0)
- ^{1} Playing statistics correct to the end of 1961.

Peter Brain (born 10 December 1944) is a former Australian rules footballer who played with South Melbourne in the Victorian Football League (VFL).
