= List of Indigenous Australian VFL/AFL and AFL Women's players =

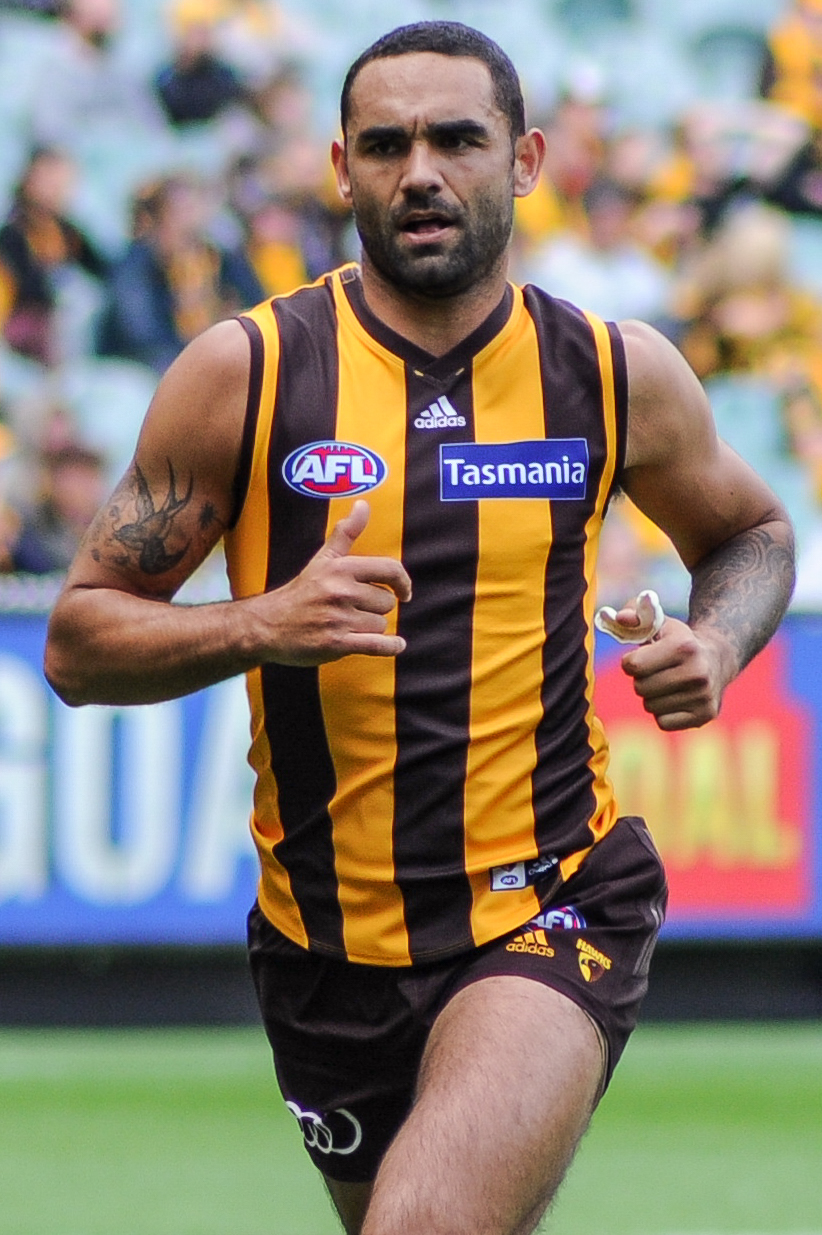
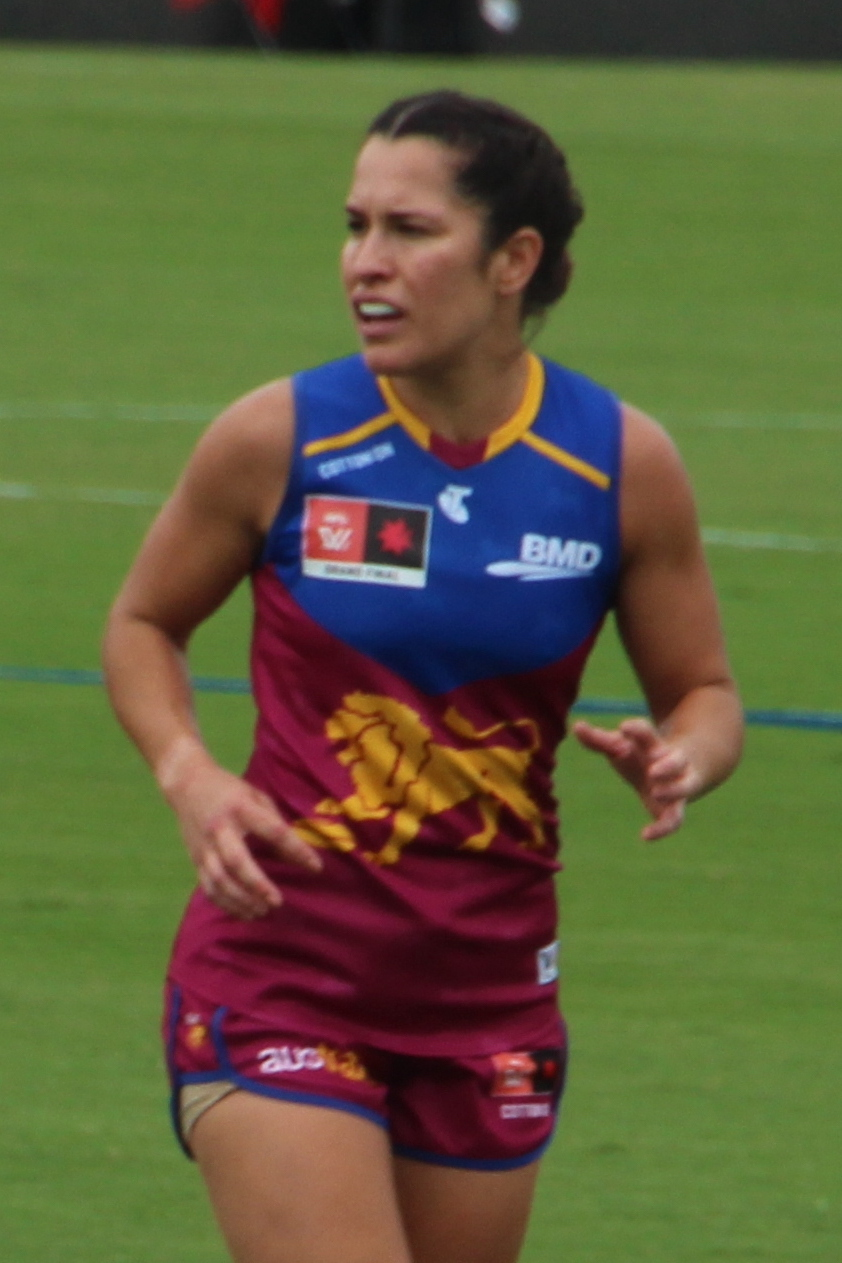
Current record-holders for most games by an Indigenous player in the VFL/AFL (Shaun Burgoyne, 407 games for Port Adelaide and Hawthorn) and AFL Women's (Ally Anderson, 66 games for Brisbane)

Since the Victorian Football League (VFL), which is now known as the Australian Football League (AFL), was formed in 1897, there have been 178 known players of Indigenous Australian heritage that have played in a senior VFL/AFL match, and 11 known players of in the AFL Women's since the inaugural season in 2017. A senior VFL/AFL or AFL Women's match is an Australian rules football match between two clubs that are, or have been in the past, members of the VFL/AFL or of the AFL Women's. A senior VFL/AFL or AFL Women's match is played under the laws of Australian football, and includes regular season matches, as well as finals series matches. It does not include pre-season matches, interstate matches or international rules football matches. The list is arranged in alphabetical order by surname.

The first recognised Indigenous Australian player to play in a senior VFL/AFL match was Joe Johnson who played 55 games for Fitzroy from 1904 to 1906, and was a member of Fitzroy's dual premiership-winning sides of 1904 and 1905. Gavin Wanganeen (Essendon and Port Adelaide) was the first Indigenous Australian player to play 300 games, and Shaun Burgoyne is the current record-holder of most games played by an Indigenous player with 407 games for Port Adelaide and Hawthorn from 2002 onwards.

As of the 2025 AFL Season, there are 62 Indigenous players listed with an AFL club. In 2020, a record 87 Indigenous and Torres Strait Islander players featured on AFL lists, a number which has annually declined since.

The Fremantle Football Club, initially under inaugural coach Gerard Neesham, have been strong supporters of Indigenous players. They have had 34 Indigenous players represent their club in AFL matches, and hold the record for most players in one game, with eight in Indigenous Round (Round 10), 2017.

The two Western Australian teams, Fremantle and West Coast, have both had the most Indigenous players on their list, with 36 and 35 Indigenous players respectively.

== Players ==
Players are listed in alphabetical order, and statistics are for VFL/AFL or AFL Women's regular season and finals series matches only. "Career span" years are from the season of the player's debut in the VFL/AFL or AFL Women's to the year in which they played their final game in the VFL/AFL or AFL Women's and have since been removed from the playing list. Currently listed players are shaded in green and their career span is listed as "(year of debut)–present". Statistics are correct to round 10 in the 2024 AFL season and the end of the 2024 AFL Women's season.

Legend

Players named in the Indigenous Team of the Century are indicated by a # next to their name.
Currently listed players

=== VFL/AFL Mens ===
Indigenous Australian VFL/AFL players
Name	Club(s)	Seasons	Games	Goals	Notes
Winston Abraham	Fremantle; North Melbourne	1995–2001	110	159	Premiership: 1999; Mark of the Year: 1998
Brendon Ah Chee	Port Adelaide; West Coast	2012–2021	58	31	
Callum Ah Chee	Gold Coast; Brisbane Lions; Adelaide	2016–present	153	88	Premiership: 2024
Matthew Ahmat	Brisbane Lions; Sydney	1991–1994	8	1	
Robert Ahmat	Collingwood; Sydney	1995–2001	67	68	
Karl Amon	Port Adelaide; Hawthorn	2014–present	179	70	
Jed Anderson	Hawthorn; North Melbourne	2013–2022	99	32	
Joe Anderson	Carlton	2007–2010	17	0	
Tony Armstrong	Adelaide; Sydney; Collingwood	2010–2015	35	2	
Jarrod Atkinson	Essendon	2008–2010	17	5	
Les Bamblett	Melbourne; Footscray	1983–1988	48	71	
Chance Bateman	Hawthorn	2000–2012	177	67	Premiership: 2008
Laurie Bellotti	West Coast	1999–2000	24	2	
Toby Bedford	Melbourne; Greater Western Sydney	2020–present	69	36	
James Bell	Sydney	2019–2022	28	10	
Harley Bennell	Gold Coast; Fremantle; Melbourne	2011–2020	88	98	
Jamie Bennell	Melbourne; West Coast	2009–2016	87	26	
Eddie Betts	Carlton; Adelaide	2005–2021	350	640	All-Australian: 2015, 2016, 2017; Goal of the Year: 2006, 2015, 2016, 2019; Club leading goalkicker: 2010, 2012, 2014, 2015, 2016, 2017
Peter Bird	Fitzroy	1995–1996	15	7	
Alan Bloomfield	North Melbourne	1970–1971	13	7	
Ashley Blurton	West Coast; Richmond	1995–1999	24	9	
Darren Bolton	Fremantle	1999	2	0	
Shai Bolton	Richmond; Fremantle	2017–present	144	177	Premiership: 2019, 2020; All-Australian: 2022; Mark of the Year: 2021
Shane Bond	West Coast; Port Adelaide	1994–2000	91	31	Premiership: 1994
Troy Bond	Carlton; Adelaide	1994–1999	94	77	Premiership: 1997
Tyler Brockman	Hawthorn; West Coast	2021–present	43	29	
Jase Burgoyne	Port Adelaide	2022–present	46	9	
Peter Burgoyne #	Port Adelaide	1997–2009	240	193	Indigenous Team of the Century; Premiership: 2004
Shaun Burgoyne	Port Adelaide; Hawthorn	2002–2021	407	301	Most VFL/AFL games by an Indigenous player Premiership: 2004, 2013, 2014, 2015; All-Australian: 2006
Ronnie Burns	Geelong; Adelaide	1996–2004	154	262	
Norm Byron	Fitzroy	1918	2	1	
Barry Cable #	North Melbourne	1970, 1974–1977	115	133	Indigenous Team of the Century (player and coach); Australian Football Hall of Fame (legend); Premiership: 1975, 1977; All-Australian: 1966, 1969, 1979 (coach); Syd Barker Medal: 1970
Shane Cable	West Coast	1989	1	0	
Charlie Cameron	Adelaide; Brisbane Lions	2014–present	237	412	Premiership: 2024, 2025, 2026; All-Australian: 2019, 2023; Brisbane Lions leading goalkicker: 2019, 2020, 2021, 2022
Jarrod Cameron	West Coast	2019–2021	12	13	
Fred Campbell	Sydney; St Kilda	1999–2000	12	7	
Matt Campbell	North Melbourne	2007–2012	82	79	
Warren Campbell	North Melbourne	1994–1995	19	17	
Jason Carter	Fremantle	2019–2020	2	0	
Kevin Caton	West Coast; Fitzroy; Brisbane Bears	1988–1990	18	18	
Sean Charles	Melbourne; Carlton; St Kilda	1992–1998, 2000	56	66	
Scott Chisholm	Fremantle; Melbourne	1995–2000	81	33	
Allen Christensen	Geelong; Brisbane Lions	2011–2020	133	114	Premiership: 2011
Raphael Clarke	St Kilda	2004–2012	85	9	
Xavier Clarke	St Kilda; Brisbane Lions	2002–2010	106	49	
Eric Clarke	St Kilda	1980	6	6	
Nakia Cockatoo	Geelong; Brisbane Lions	2015–2023	49	32	
Che Cockatoo-Collins	Essendon; Port Adelaide	1994–2003	160	215	
David Cockatoo-Collins	Melbourne	1996–1997	2	0	
Don Cockatoo-Collins	Melbourne	1996–1998	9	3	
Adam Cockie	West Coast	2009	7	3	
Richard Cole	Collingwood; Essendon	2002–2007	63	6	
Keidean Coleman	Brisbane Lions	2020–present	66	14	
Clayton Collard	Fremantle	2007	1	1	
Cyril Collard	Hawthorn	1957–1958	13	3	
Troy Cook	Sydney; Fremantle	1997–2007	193	77	Doig Medal: 2000
Reuben Cooper	South Melbourne	1969	2	0	
Anthony Corrie	Brisbane Lions; Collingwood	2004–2009	56	50	
Matt Coulthard	Richmond	2023–2024	5	2	
Shannon Cox	Collingwood	2007–2009	25	6	
Percy Cummings	Hawthorn	1964–1965	5	1	
Robert Cummings	Fitzroy	1990	1	0	
Trent Cummings	Fitzroy; West Coast	1994–1997	29	19	
Aaron Davey	Melbourne	2004–2013	150	152	Keith 'Bluey' Truscott Trophy: 2009
Alwyn Davey	Essendon	2007–2013	100	120	
Alwyn Davey Jr.	Essendon	2023–present	20	9	
Ben Davis	Adelaide	2017–2022	11	1	
Leon Davis	Collingwood	2000–2011	225	270	Premiership: 2010; All-Australian: 2009, 2011; Goal of the Year: 2008
Courtenay Dempsey	Essendon	2006–2016	133	35	
Tyrell Dewar	West Coast	2024–present	14	8	
Gary Dhurrkay	Fremantle; North Melbourne	1995–2000	72	66	
Brad Dick	Collingwood	2007–2011	27	32	
Willie Dick	Essendon	1992	7	6	
Nathan Djerrkura	Geelong; Western Bulldogs	2009–2012	25	8	
Isaiah Dudley	Fremantle	2025–present	8	6	
Mitchell Edwards	Geelong	2026–present	1	0	
Shane Edwards	Richmond	2007–2022	303	189	Premiership: 2017, 2019, 2020; All-Australian: 2018
Alf Egan	Carlton; North Melbourne	1931–1935	51	27	
Chris Egan	Collingwood	2005–2008	27	22	
Phil Egan	Richmond; Melbourne	1982–1991	126	117	
Derek Eggmolesse-Smith	Richmond	2018–2021	9	0	
Cam Ellis-Yolmen	Adelaide; Brisbane Lions	2012–2022	48	18	
Polly Farmer #	Geelong	1962–1967	101	65	Indigenous Team of the Century (c); Australian Football Hall of Fame (legend); Premiership: 1963; All-Australian: 1956, 1958, 1961; Carji Greeves Medal: 1963, 1964; Geelong captain: 1965–1967
Jeff Farmer	Melbourne; Fremantle	1995–2008	249	483	All-Australian: 2000
Jy Farrar	Gold Coast	2020–present	34	3	
Cameron Faulkner	Western Bulldogs	2004–2007	18	9	
Jeremy Finlayson	Greater Western Sydney; Port Adelaide	2015–2025	125	165	Port Adelaide leading goalkicker: 2023
Fabian Francis	Melbourne; Brisbane Bears; Port Adelaide	1991–1995 & 1997–2001	109	61	
Lance Franklin	Hawthorn; Sydney	2005–2023	350	1059	Most VFL/AFL goals scored by an Indigenous player Coleman Medal: 2008, 2011, 2014, 2017; Premiership: 2008, 2013; All-Australian: 2008, 2010, 2011, 2012, 2014, 2016, 2017, 2018 (c); Goal of the Year: 2010, 2013; Peter Crimmins Medal: 2008
Jeff Garlett	Carlton; Melbourne	2009–2019	185	321	
Cruize Garlett	North Melbourne	2009–2012	32	9	
Joel Garner	Port Adelaide	2018–2021	4	0	
Adam Goodes #	Sydney	1999–2015	372	464	Indigenous Team of the Century; Brownlow Medal : 2003, 2006; Premiership: 2005, 2012; All-Australian: 2003, 2006, 2009, 2011; Rising Star: 1999; Bob Skilton Medal: 2003, 2006, 2011; Sydney captain: 2009–2012
Brett Goodes	Western Bulldogs	2013–2015	22	4	
Colin Graham	Melbourne	1975–1978	35	32	
Jade Gresham	St Kilda; Essendon	2016–present	165	153	St Kilda leading goalkicker: 2018
Brady Grey	Fremantle	2014–2018	21	11	
Jonathon Griffin	Adelaide; Fremantle	2007–2017	97	36	
Antoni Grover	Fremantle	1999–2012	202	27	
Joel Hamling	Western Bulldogs; Fremantle; Sydney	2015–present	99	2	Premiership: 2016
Curtly Hampton	Greater Western Sydney; Adelaide	2012–2018	63	14	
Robert Hansen Jr.	North Melbourne	2023–present	12	4	
Jarrod Harbrow	Western Bulldogs; Gold Coast	2007–2021	262	54	Gold Coast Suns Club Champion: 2018
Roger Hayden	Fremantle	2002–2011	128	14	
Des Headland	Brisbane Lions; Fremantle	1999–2010	166	177	Premiership: 2002
Liam Henry	Fremantle; St Kilda	2020–present	56	20	
Elijah Hewett	West Coast	2023–present	22	10	
Bobby Hill	Greater Western Sydney; Collingwood	2019–present	98	113	Premiership: 2023; Norm Smith Medal: 2023; Mark of the Year: 2024; Collingwood leading goalkicker: 2024
Bradley Hill	Hawthorn; Fremantle; St Kilda	2012–present	285	106	Premiership: 2013, 2014, 2015; Doig Medal: 2017
Josh Hill	Western Bulldogs; West Coast	2007–2017	173	226	
Stephen Hill	Fremantle	2009–2021	206	112	
Eddie Hocking	Adelaide	1991	11	4	
Rhan Hooper	Brisbane Lions; Hawthorn	2006–2010	54	56	
Jason Horne-Francis	North Melbourne; Port Adelaide	2022–present	75	55	
Jarman Impey	Port Adelaide; Hawthorn	2014–present	206	63	
Jack Ison	Carlton	2026–present	1	0	
Eddie Jackson	Melbourne	1947–1952	84	10	Premiership: 1948
Syd Jackson #	Carlton	1969–1976	136	165	Indigenous Team of the Century; Premiership: 1970, 1972
Jarrhan Jacky	Adelaide	2008	3	1	
Shadrach James	Fitzroy	1940–1941	18	20	
Joel Jeffrey	Gold Coast	2021–present	37	17	
Russell Jeffrey	St Kilda; Brisbane Bears	1987–1992	50	4	
Leroy Jetta	Essendon	2007–2014	93	80	
Lewis Jetta	Sydney; West Coast	2010–2020	196	115	Premiership: 2012, 2018
Neville Jetta	Melbourne	2009–2021	159	24	
Graham Johncock	Adelaide	2002–2013	227	120	
Ash Johnson	Collingwood	2021–2025	27	36	
Bert Johnson	North Melbourne	1965–1968	31	5	
Chris Johnson #	Fitzroy; Brisbane Lions	1994–2007	264	172	Indigenous Team of the Century; Premiership: 2001, 2002, 2003; All-Australian: 2002, 2004; Brisbane Lions captain: 2007
Joe Johnson	Fitzroy	1904–1906	55	15	Premiership: 1904, 1905
Michael Johnson	Fremantle	2005–2018	244	68	All-Australian: 2013
Percy Johnson	North Melbourne	1951–1955	52	4	
Lloyd Johnston	Gold Coast	2023–2025	9	3	
Bob Jones	St Kilda	1988–1989	20	2	
Jamaine Jones	Geelong; West Coast	2017–2024	66	23	
Lachie Jones	Port Adelaide	2021–present	65	6	
Liam Jones	Western Bulldogs; Carlton	2010–2025	204	84	
Liam Jurrah	Melbourne	2009–2012	36	81	Mark of the Year: 2010
Tim Kelly	Geelong; West Coast	2018–present	152	79	All-Australian: 2019; John Worsfold Medal: 2023
Isaac Keeler	St Kilda	2025–present	11	10	
Adam Kerinaiua	Brisbane Bears	1992	3	1	
Dale Kickett	Fitzroy; West Coast; St Kilda; Essendon; Fremantle	1990–2002	181	64	Doig Medal: 1997
Derek Kickett	North Melbourne; Essendon; Sydney	1989–1996	152	179	
Steven Koops	Fremantle; Western Bulldogs	1996–2004	89	49	
Andrew J. Krakouer	Richmond; Collingwood	2001–2007 & 2011–2013	137	152	Mark of the Year: 2011
Andrew L. Krakouer	North Melbourne	1989–1990	8	8	
Jim Krakouer #	North Melbourne; St Kilda	1982–1991	147	236	Indigenous Team of the Century; Syd Barker Medal: 1986
Nathan Krakouer	Port Adelaide, Gold Coast	2007–2011, 2015–2016	82	24	
Phil Krakouer	North Melbourne; Footscray	1982–1991	148	231	
Nathan Kreuger	Geelong; Collingwood	2019–2024	15	11	
Jamie Lawson	Sydney	1991–1994	61	29	
Sean Lemmens	Gold Coast	2014–2025	148	25	
Shawn Lewfatt	Essendon	1995	3	2	
Chris Lewis #	West Coast	1987–2000	215	259	Indigenous Team of the Century; Premiership: 1992, 1994; John Worsfold Medal: 1990
Rex Liddy	Gold Coast	2011	4	0	
Jarrod Lienert	Port Adelaide; St Kilda	2018–2022	34	1	
Coen Livingstone	West Coast	—N/a	0	0	While Livingstone did not make a senior AFL appearance, he is included for his appearance with the Indigenous All-Stars in 2025.
Ben Long	St Kilda; Gold Coast	2017–present	119	76	
Michael Long #	Essendon	1989–2001	190	143	Indigenous Team of the Century; Australian Football Hall of Fame (inductee); Norm Smith Medal: 1993; Premiership: 1993, 2000; All-Australian: 1988, 1995
Andy Lovell	Melbourne; West Coast	1988–1998	164	166	
Andrew Lovett	Essendon	2005–2009	88	93	
Ted Lovett	Fitzroy	1963–1964	9	2	
Wally Lovett	Collingwood; Richmond	1982–1984	28	17	
Nathan Lovett-Murray	Essendon	2004–2013	145	73	
Malcolm Lynch	Western Bulldogs	2007	2	0	
Rhyan Mansell	Richmond	2021–present	60	37	
Neil Marshall	West Coast	1997–1998	4	0	
Jack Martin	Gold Coast; Carlton; Geelong	2014–present	151	133	
Brandon Matera	Gold Coast; Fremantle	2011–2020	139	167	
Peter Matera #	West Coast	1990–2002	253	217	Indigenous Team of the Century; Norm Smith Medal: 1992; Premiership: 1992, 1994; All-Australian: 1991, 1993, 1994, 1996, 1997; John Worsfold Medal: 1997
Phillip Matera	West Coast	1996–2005	179	389	All-Australian: 2003
Wally Matera	West Coast; Fitzroy	1987–1990	56	65	
Steven May	Gold Coast; Melbourne	2011–2025	235	24	Premiership: 2021; All-Australian: 2021, 2022; Gold Coast captain: 2017–2018
Adrian McAdam	North Melbourne	1993–1995	36	92	
Gilbert McAdam	St Kilda; Brisbane Bears	1991–1996	111	89	
Greg McAdam	St Kilda	1985	10	13	
Shane McAdam	Adelaide; Melbourne	2020–present	53	73	
Anthony McDonald-Tipungwuti	Essendon	2016–2023	133	157	
Norm McDonald #	Essendon	1947–1953	128	3	Indigenous Team of the Century; Premiership: 1949, 1950; Crichton Medal: 1951
Ashley McGrath	Brisbane Lions	2001–2014	214	170	Premiership: 2003
Cory McGrath	Essendon {AFL Car}	2001–2006	78	18	
Marty McGrath	Richmond	2003	4	6	
Michael McLean #	Footscray; Brisbane Bears; Brisbane Lions	1983–1989 & 1991–1997	183	40	Indigenous Team of the Century; All-Australian: 1988; Brisbane Bears Club Champion: 1991, 1993
Andrew McLeod #	Adelaide	1995–2010	340	275	Indigenous Team of the Century; Norm Smith Medal: 1997, 1998; Premiership: 1997, 1998; All-Australian: 1998, 2000, 2001, 2006, 2007 (c); Malcolm Blight Medal: 1997, 2001, 2007
Clem Michael	Fremantle	1998–2000	43	11	
Terry Milera	St Kilda	2012–2014	30	31	
Wayne Milera	Adelaide	2016–present	109	30	
Harry Miller	Hawthorn	2005–2006	18	13	
Michael Mitchell	Richmond	1987–1991	81	103	All-Australian: 1985, 1986; Mark of the Year: 1990
Gavin Mitchell	Fremantle; St Kilda	1996–2000	88	82	
Irving Mosquito	Essendon	2020–2021	4	2	
Daniel Motlop	Kangaroos; Port Adelaide	2001–2011	130	208	
Jesse Motlop	Carlton	2022–present	50	48	
Marlon Motlop	Port Adelaide	2008–2009	5	2	
Shannon Motlop	Kangaroos; Melbourne	1999–2003; 2005–2006	64	36	Premiership: 1999
Steven Motlop	Geelong; Port Adelaide	2010–2022	217	229	
Robbie Muir	St Kilda	1974–1978, 1980 & 1984	68	23	
Justin Murphy	Richmond; Carlton; Geelong; Essendon	1994–2005	185	151	
Allan Murray	Port Adelaide; St Kilda	2002–2006	16	13	
Derek Murray	Port Adelaide	1999–2002	23	7	
Mark Naley	Carlton	1987–1990	65	74	Premiership: 1987; All-Australian: 1986, 1987
Phil Narkle	St Kilda; West Coast	1984–1987 & 1990	66	55	All-Australian: 1986, 1987
Quinton Narkle	Geelong; Port Adelaide; Fremantle	2018–2025	59	27	
Murray Newman	West Coast	2012–2015	6	4	
Douglas Nicholls	Fitzroy	1932–1937	54	2	
Jarrad Oakley-Nicholls	Richmond	2006–2009	13	1	
Michael O'Loughlin #	Sydney	1995–2009	303	521	Indigenous Team of the Century; Australian Football Hall of Fame (inductee); Premiership: 2005; All-Australian: 1997, 2000; Bob Skilton Medal: 1998
Ricky O'Loughlin	Adelaide	2000–2001	9	2	
Brandan Parfitt	Geelong	2017–2024	130	48	Premiership: 2022
Matthew Parker	St Kilda; Richmond	2019–2022	30	23	
Liam Patrick	Gold Coast	2011–2013	13	6	
Alex Pearce	Fremantle	2014–present	132	7	Fremantle captain: 2023–present
Danyle Pearce	Port Adelaide; Fremantle	2005–2018	252	126	Rising Star: 2006
Derek Peardon	Richmond	1968–1971	20	1	
Carl Peterson	Hawthorn	2010	17	13	
Jared Petrenko	Adelaide	2009–2014	76	50	
Sam Petrevski-Seton	Carlton; West Coast	2017–2023	121	24	
Byron Pickett #	North Melbourne; Port Adelaide; Melbourne	1997–2007	204	177	Indigenous Team of the Century; Norm Smith Medal: 2004; Premiership: 1999, 2004; All-Australian: 1999; Rising Star: 1998
Latrelle Pickett	Melbourne	2026–present	1	1	
Kysaiah Pickett	Melbourne	2020–present	113	174	Premiership: 2021
Marlion Pickett	Richmond	2019–2024	91	27	Premiership: 2019, 2020
Sam Powell-Pepper	Port Adelaide	2017–present	152	120	
Lionel Proctor	Richmond	1998–2001	20	4	
Albert Proud	Brisbane Lions	2007–2010	29	10	
Izak Rankine	Gold Coast; Adelaide	2019–present	93	135	
Elkin Reilly	South Melbourne	1962–1966	51	2	
Cyril Rioli	Hawthorn	2008–2018	189	275	Norm Smith Medal: 2015; Premiership: 2008, 2013, 2014, 2015; All-Australian: 2012, 2015, 2016; Goal of the Year: 2009
Daniel Rioli	Richmond; Gold Coast	2018–present	192	114	Premiership: 2017, 2019, 2020; Goal of the Year: 2017; Jack Dyer Medal: 2024
Dean Rioli	Essendon	1999–2006	100	91	
Maurice Rioli #	Richmond	1982–1987	118	80	Indigenous Team of the Century; Norm Smith Medal: 1982; All-Australian: 1983, 1986, 1988; Jack Dyer Medal: 1982, 1983
Maurice Rioli Jr.	Richmond	2021–present	40	29	
Willie Rioli	West Coast; Port Adelaide	2017–2025	99	137	Premiership: 2018
Relton Roberts	Richmond	2010	2	0	
Jason Roe	Collingwood; Brisbane Lions	2006–2009	50	7	
Malcolm Rosas	Gold Coast	2021–present	47	46	
Lachlan Ross	Essendon	1994	2	1	
Shannon Rusca	Brisbane Lions	2000	2	0	
Liam Ryan	West Coast	2018–present	113	147	Premiership: 2018; All-Australian: 2020; Mark of the Year: 2019
Paddy Ryder	Essendon; Port Adelaide; St Kilda	2006–2022	281	197	All-Australian: 2017; John Cahill Medal: 2017; ANZAC Day Medal: 2009
Ashley Sampi	West Coast	2002–2006	78	97	Mark of the Year: 2004
Ryley Sanders	Western Bulldogs	2024–present	24	9	
Eddie Sansbury	North Melbourne	2004–2008	40	21	
Sam Sheldon	Brisbane Lions	2009–2012	43	11	
Casey Sibosado	Fremantle	2011	1	1	
George Simmonds	Melbourne	1924	4	4	
Jy Simpkin	North Melbourne	2017–present	162	69	Syd Barker Medal: 2021, 2022; North Melbourne captain: 2023–present
Dwayne Simpson	Fremantle	2001	2	1	
Josh Simpson	Fremantle	2013–2014	2	1	
Zephaniah Skinner	Western Bulldogs	2011–2012	8	5	
Phoenix Spicer	North Melbourne	2021–2023	12	2	
Brennan Stack	Western Bulldogs	2009–2011	21	17	
Sydney Stack	Richmond	2019–2022	34	19	
Brian Stanislaus	Sydney	1991	1	0	
Tyson Stengle	Richmond; Adelaide; Geelong	2017–present	95	152	Premiership: 2022; All-Australian: 2022
Charlie Stewart	Footscray	1961	20	4	
Cameron Stokes	Hawthorn	2008–2010	20	10	
Mathew Stokes	Geelong; Essendon	2006–2016	200	209	Premiership: 2007, 2011
Byron Sumner	Sydney	2011	1	0	
Richard Tambling	Richmond; Adelaide	2005–2013	124	62	
Garth Taylor	Fremantle	1999–2000	15	13	
Kevin Taylor	South Melbourne; Fitzroy	1981 & 1984	15	25	All-Australian: 1983
Troy Taylor	Richmond	2010	4	0	
Lindsay Thomas	North Melbourne	2007–2018	201	322	
Tarryn Thomas	North Melbourne	2019–2023	69	56	
Wade Thompson	Port Adelaide	2009	2	0	
Alan Thorpe	Sydney; Western Bulldogs	1992–1994	15	28	
Shane Tongerie	Adelaide	1994	4	3	
Troy Ugle	West Coast	1988–1993	43	43	
Keren Ugle	Fremantle	2001	4	2	
Jamarra Ugle-Hagan	Western Bulldogs	2021–present	67	103	
Travis Varcoe	Geelong; Collingwood	2007–2020	182	148	Premiership: 2009, 2011
Rod Waddell	Carlton; Geelong	1981–1984	25	12	
Andrew Walker	Carlton	2004–2016	202	139	
Michael Walters	Fremantle	2009–2025	239	365	All-Australian: 2019; Fremantle leading goalkicker: 2013, 2015, 2016, 2018, 2019
James Wandin	St Kilda	1952–1953	17	3	
Gavin Wanganeen #	Essendon; Port Adelaide	1991–2006	300	202	Indigenous Team of the Century; Australian Football Hall of Fame (inductee); Brownlow Medal: 1993; Premiership: 1993, 2004; All-Australian: 1992, 1993, 1995, 2001, 2003; John Cahill Medal: 2003; Port Adelaide captain: 1997–2000
Tex Wanganeen	Essendon	2022–2024	5	1	
Nasiah Wanganeen-Milera	St Kilda	2022–present	73	12	
Elijah Ware	Port Adelaide	2005	2	1	
Gerrick Weedon	West Coast	2011	1	0	
Isaac Weetra	Melbourne	2008	2	0	
Sharrod Wellingham	Collingwood; West Coast	2008–2017	167	73	Premiership: 2010
Daniel Wells	North Melbourne; Collingwood	2003–2019	247	153	Goal of the Year: 2004; Syd Barker Medal: 2011, 2013
Mark West	Western Bulldogs	1996–1998	16	3	
Matthew Whelan	Melbourne	2000–2009	150	15	
Darryl White #	Brisbane Lions	1992–2005	268	165	Indigenous Team of the Century; Premiership: 2001, 2002, 2003
Djaran Whyman	North Melbourne	2007	3	4	
Mark Williams	Hawthorn; Essendon	2002–2010	115	247	Premiership: 2008
Russell Williams	Essendon	1994	3	1	
Zac Williams	Greater Western Sydney; Carlton	2013–present	162	55	
Nathan Wilson	Greater Western Sydney; Fremantle	2012–2023	155	18	
Isiah Winder	West Coast	2021–2023	7	4	
Marcus Windhager	St Kilda	2022–present	62	68	
Chad Wingard	Port Adelaide; Hawthorn	2012–2024	218	300	All-Australian: 2013, 2015; Mark of the Year: 2014; John Cahill Medal: 2013
Nicholas Winmar	St Kilda	2010–2011	2		
Nicky Winmar #	St Kilda; Western Bulldogs	1987–1999	251	317	Indigenous Team of the Century; Australian Football Hall of Fame (inductee); All-Australian: 1991, 1995; Mark of the Year: 1992; Trevor Barker Award: 1989, 1995
David Wirrpanda	West Coast	1996–2009	227	131	Premiership: 2006; All-Australian: 2005
Clinton Wolf	Fremantle	1995	4	0	
Austin Wonaeamirri	Melbourne	2008 & 2010–2011	31	37	
Dion Woods	Fremantle	2001–2005	59	7	
Peter Yagmoor	Collingwood	2012–2012	2	0	
Chris Yarran	Carlton	2009–2015	119	90	Goal of the Year: 2012
Robbie Young	St Kilda	2019	3	2	

=== AFL Women's ===
Indigenous Australian AFL Women's players
Name	Club(s)	Seasons	Games	Goals	Notes	Ref/s
Ally Anderson	Brisbane	2017–present	66	8	Most AFLW games by an Indigenous player AFLW best and fairest: 2022 (S7); 2× premiership player: 2021, 2023; 3× All-Australian: 2019, 2023, 2024; 4× Brisbane best and fairest: 2019, 2021, 2023, 2024	
J'Noemi Anderson	St Kilda	2022 (S7)–present	5	0		
Taylah Angel	Fremantle	2017	4	0		
Jaide Anthony	Sydney	2022 (S7)–present	1	0		
Kaitlyn Ashmore	Brisbane; North Melbourne; Hawthorn	2017–present	58	23		
Janet Baird	Gold Coast; Hawthorn	2021–present	4	0		
Kirby Bentley	Fremantle; Carlton	2017–2019	10	1		
Gabrielle Biedenweg-Webster	Gold Coast	2022 (S7)–present	1	0		
Mattea Breed	Hawthorn; Collingwood	2023–present	20	3		
Codie Briggs	Greater Western Sydney	2017	3	0		
Ashanti Bush	Gold Coast	2022 (S6)–present	7	2	Goal of the Year: 2022 (S7)	
Imahra Cameron	West Coast	2020–2022 (S7)	23	10		
Mia-Rae Clifford	Melbourne; Geelong; Fremantle	2017; 2019–2020	18	8		
Laquoiya Cockatoo-Motlap	Port Adelaide	2022 (S7)	1	0		
Litonya Cockatoo-Motlap	Port Adelaide	2022 (S7)–2023	4	0		
Cassie Davidson	Fremantle; West Coast	2017–2020	17	0		
Dakota Davidson	Brisbane	2020–present	39	32	2× premiership player: 2021, 2023; All-Australian: 2023	
Zippy Fish	Sydney	2025–present	12	4	Rising Star: 2025	
Naomi Ferres	Western Bulldogs	2018–present	50	1	Premiership player: 2018	
Mackenzie Ford	Richmond	2024–present	23	5		
Delma Gisu	Greater Western Sydney	2019	1	0		
Courtney Hodder	Brisbane	2021–present	36	27	2× premiership player: 2021, 2023; Goal of the Year: 2021	
Gemma Houghton	Fremantle; Port Adelaide	2017–present	50	44	2× All-Australian: 2019, 2020	
Kalinda Howarth	Gold Coast; Collingwood (Note: Howarth was also on Brisbane's list in 2018, but did not play a game for the club.)	2020–present	34	20	All-Australian: 2020	
Alicia Janz	Fremantle; West Coast	2017–2021	20	0		
Mia King	North Melbourne	2020–present	37	5	Premiership player: 2024	
Sarah Last	Carlton	2017–2018	5	0		
Shaleise Law	Brisbane	2017	3	0		
Emily McGuire	Fremantle; West Coast	2018; 2020	6	2		
Mikayla Morrison	Fremantle	2022 (S6)–present	4	3		
Aliesha Newman	Melbourne; Collingwood; Sydney; Greater Western Sydney	2017–present	48	17	Goal of the Year: 2018	
Demi Okely	Fremantle	2017	7	0		
Paige Parker	Brisbane; Gold Coast	2019–2021	17	2		
Krstel Petrevski	Melbourne; West Coast	2020–present	10	2		
Kira Phillips	Fremantle	2017	5	2		
Natalie Plane	Carlton; St Kilda	2017–2025	36	5		
Danielle Ponter	Adelaide	2019–present	45	46	Most AFLW goals scored by an Indigenous player Premiership: 2019, 2022 (S6); All-Australian: 2023	
Georgie Prespakis	Geelong	2022 (S6)–present	19	2	2× All-Australian: 2022 (S7), 2025	
Maddy Prespakis	Carlton; Essendon	2019–present	44	21	AFLW best and fairest: 2020; 3× All-Australian: 2019, 2020, 2022 (S7); Rising Star: 2019; Carlton best and fairest: 2019, 2020, 2022; Essendon best and fairest: 2022 (S7)	
Claire Ransom	Gold Coast; Greater Western Sydney	2022 (S7)–present	2	0		
Paige Scott	Essendon; Richmond	2022 (S7)–present	39	15		
Jasmin Stewart	Fremantle; Port Adelaide	2020–2022 (S6); 2023–present	22	6		
Heidi Talbot	Gold Coast	2026–present	0	0		
Tarnee Tester	West Coast (Note: Tester was also on Fremantle's list in 2021, but did not play a game for the club.)	2020	4	1		
Tayla Thorn	Adelaide; Gold Coast	2017; 2020	8	0		
Tiah Toth	Fremantle	2017–2018; 2021–2022 (S6)	24	1		
Ruth Wallace	Adelaide	2018	7	7		
Stephanie Williams	Geelong; Richmond	2021–present	9	0		

=== Families ===
Statistics updated to end of round 12 of the 2023 AFL season and end of AFLW season seven.

Indigenous Australian VFL/AFL and AFL Women's families
Family	Name	Years	Games	Combined games	Notes
Ah Chee	Brendon	2012–2021	58	164	Brendon is Callum's older brother.
Ah Chee	Callum	2016–present	106	164	Brendon is Callum's older brother.
Anderson	Joe	2007–2010	17	121	Joe, Jed and J'Noemi are siblings, in that order of age.
Anderson	Jed	2013–present	99	121	Joe, Jed and J'Noemi are siblings, in that order of age.
Anderson	J'Noemi	2022–present	5	121	Joe, Jed and J'Noemi are siblings, in that order of age.
Bolton	Darren	1999	2	104	Darren is Shai's father.
Bolton	Shai	2017–present	102	104	Darren is Shai's father.
Bond	Shane	1994–2000	91	185	Troy is Shane's older brother.
Bond	Troy	1994–1999	94	185	Troy is Shane's older brother.
Burgoyne	Peter	1997–2009	240	657	Peter is Shaun's older brother and Jase's father.
Burgoyne	Shaun	2002–2021	407	657	Peter is Shaun's older brother and Jase's father.
Burgoyne	Jase	2022–present	10	657	Peter is Shaun's older brother and Jase's father.
Cable	Barry	1970; 1974–1977	115	116	Barry is Shane's father.
Cable	Shane	1989	1	116	Barry is Shane's father.
Cameron	Charlie	2014–present	187	199	Charlie is Jarrod's older brother.
Cameron	Jarrod	2019–2020	12	199	Charlie is Jarrod's older brother.
Clarke	Xavier	2002–2010	106	191	Xavier is Raphael's older brother.
Clarke	Raphael	2004–2012	85	191	Xavier is Raphael's older brother.
Cockatoo-Collins	Che	1994–2003	160	171	Che is older brother of David and Don, who are twins.
Cockatoo-Collins	David	1996–1997	2	171	Che is older brother of David and Don, who are twins.
Cockatoo-Collins	Don	1996–1998	9	171	Che is older brother of David and Don, who are twins.
Cockatoo-Motlap	Laquoiya	2022–present	1	5	Laquoiya and Litonya are twins.
Cockatoo-Motlap	Litonya	2022–present	4	5	Laquoiya and Litonya are twins.
Cummings	See Johnson/Cummings				
Davey	Aaron	2004–2013	178	286	Aaron is older brother of Alwyn Sr., who is father of Alwyn Jr.
Davey	Alwyn Sr.	2007–2013	100	286	Aaron is older brother of Alwyn Sr., who is father of Alwyn Jr.
Davey	Alwyn Jr.	2023–present	8	286	Aaron is older brother of Alwyn Sr., who is father of Alwyn Jr.
Egan/Lovett	Alf Egan	1931–1935	51	60	Alf was Ted's father.
Egan/Lovett	Ted Lovett	1963–1964	9	60	Alf was Ted's father.
Francis	Fabian	1991–1994; 1997–2001	109	138	Fabian is Jason's stepfather.
Francis	Jason Horne-Francis	2022–present	29	138	Fabian is Jason's stepfather.
Goodes	Adam	1999–2015	272	294	Adam is Brett's older brother.
Goodes	Brett	2013–2015	22	294	Adam is Brett's older brother.
Hill	Stephen	2009–2020	218	440	Stephen is Bradley's older brother.
Hill	Bradley	2012–present	222	440	Stephen is Bradley's older brother.
Horne-Francis	See Francis				
Johnson/Cummings	Joe Johnson	1904–1906	55	142	Joe was father of Percy Johnson and grandfather of Percy Cummings. Percy Cummings is father of Robert and Trent, the former of whom is older.
Johnson/Cummings	Percy Johnson	1951–1955	52	142	Joe was father of Percy Johnson and grandfather of Percy Cummings. Percy Cummings is father of Robert and Trent, the former of whom is older.
Johnson/Cummings	Percy Cummings	1964–1965	5	142	Joe was father of Percy Johnson and grandfather of Percy Cummings. Percy Cummings is father of Robert and Trent, the former of whom is older.
Johnson/Cummings	Robert Cummings	1990	1	142	Joe was father of Percy Johnson and grandfather of Percy Cummings. Percy Cummings is father of Robert and Trent, the former of whom is older.
Johnson/Cummings	Trent Cummings	1994–1997	29	142	Joe was father of Percy Johnson and grandfather of Percy Cummings. Percy Cummings is father of Robert and Trent, the former of whom is older.
Jones	Bob	1988–1989	20	193	Bob is Liam's father.
Jones	Liam	2009–2021; 2023–present	173	193	Bob is Liam's father.
Krakouer	Jim	1982–1991	147	440	Jim, Phil and Andrew L. are brothers, in that order of age. Andrew J. is Jim's son.
Krakouer	Phil	1982–1991	148	440	Jim, Phil and Andrew L. are brothers, in that order of age. Andrew J. is Jim's son.
Krakouer	Andrew L.	1989–1990	8	440	Jim, Phil and Andrew L. are brothers, in that order of age. Andrew J. is Jim's son.
Krakouer	Andrew J.	2001–2007; 2010–2013	137	440	Jim, Phil and Andrew L. are brothers, in that order of age. Andrew J. is Jim's son.
Long	Michael	1989–2001	190	195	Michael is Jake's father.
Long	Jake	2016–2018	5	195	Michael is Jake's father.
Lovett	See Egan/Lovett				
Matera	Wally	1987–1990	56	632	Wally, Peter and Phillip are brothers, in that order of age. Brandon is Wally's son.
Matera	Peter	1990–2002	253	632	Wally, Peter and Phillip are brothers, in that order of age. Brandon is Wally's son.
Matera	Phillip	1996–2005	179	632	Wally, Peter and Phillip are brothers, in that order of age. Brandon is Wally's son.
Matera	Brandon	2011–2020	144	632	Wally, Peter and Phillip are brothers, in that order of age. Brandon is Wally's son.
McAdam	Greg	1985	10	157	Greg, Gilbert and Adrian are brothers, in that order of age.
McAdam	Gilbert	1991–1996	111	157	Greg, Gilbert and Adrian are brothers, in that order of age.
McAdam	Adrian	1993–1995	36	157	Greg, Gilbert and Adrian are brothers, in that order of age.
McGrath	Cory	2001–2006	78	292	Cory is Ashley's older brother.
McGrath	Ashley	2001–2014	214	292	Cory is Ashley's older brother.
Milera/Sansbury	Eddie Sansbury	2004–2008	40	98	Eddie is Nasiah's biological father. Terry is Nasiah's stepfather.
Milera/Sansbury	Terry Milera	2012–2014	30	98	Eddie is Nasiah's biological father. Terry is Nasiah's stepfather.
Milera/Sansbury	Nasiah Wanganeen-Milera	2022–present	28	98	Eddie is Nasiah's biological father. Terry is Nasiah's stepfather.
Motlop	Shannon	1999–2006	64	434	Shannon, Daniel and Steven are brothers, in that order of age. Jesse is Daniel's son.
Motlop	Daniel	2001–2011	130	434	Shannon, Daniel and Steven are brothers, in that order of age. Jesse is Daniel's son.
Motlop	Steven	2010–2022	217	434	Shannon, Daniel and Steven are brothers, in that order of age. Jesse is Daniel's son.
Motlop	Jesse	2022–present	23	434	Shannon, Daniel and Steven are brothers, in that order of age. Jesse is Daniel's son.
Murray	Derek	1999–2002	23	39	Derek is Allan's older brother.
Murray	Allan	2002–2006	16	39	Derek is Allan's older brother.
O'Loughlin	Michael	1995–2009	303	312	Michael is Ricky's older brother.
O'Loughlin	Ricky	2000–2001	9	312	Michael is Ricky's older brother.
Prespakis	Maddy	2019–present	44	63	Madison is Georgie's older sister.
Prespakis	Georgie	2022–present	19	63	Madison is Georgie's older sister.
Rioli	Maurice Sr.	1982–1987	118	140	Main article: Rioli family Maurice Sr. was Maurice Jr.'s father.
Rioli	Maurice Jr.	2021–present	22	140	Main article: Rioli family Maurice Sr. was Maurice Jr.'s father.
Sansbury	See Milera/Sansbury				
Wanganeen	Gavin	1991–2006	300	305	Gavin is Tex's father.
Wanganeen	Tex	2022–present	5	305	Gavin is Tex's father.
Wanganeen-Milera	See Milera/Sansbury				

== See also ==
- Category:Indigenous Australian rugby league players
