= Cameron Stokes =

Australian rules footballer (born 1989)

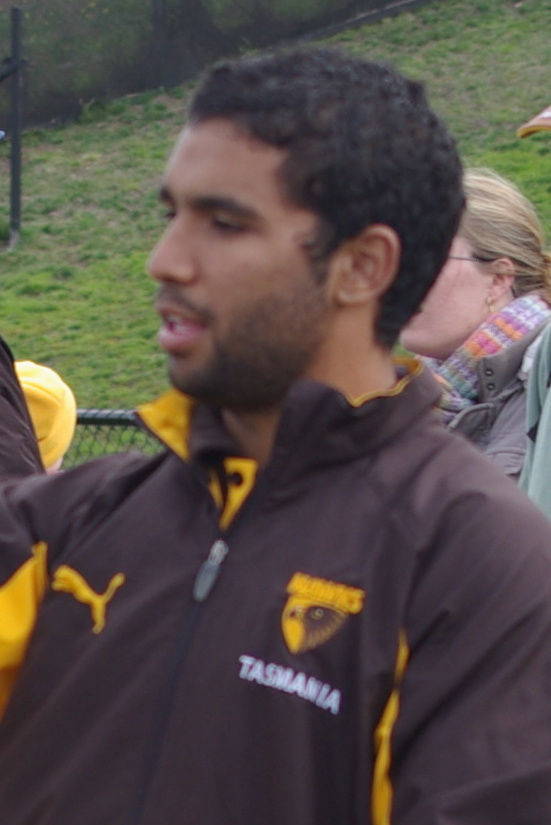
- Stokes with Hawthorn in 2008

Personal information
- Full name: Cameron Stokes
- Born: 2 July 1989 (age 37); Australia
- Original team: Darwin
- Draft: No. 54, 2008 rookie draft
- Debut: Round 1, 2008, Hawthorn vs. Melbourne, at Melbourne Cricket Ground
- Height: 174 cm (5 ft 9 in)
- Weight: 74 kg (163 lb)
- Position: Midfielder

Playing career^{1}
Years	Club	Games (Goals)
2008–2010	Hawthorn	20 (8)
- ^{1} Playing statistics correct to the end of 2010.

Cameron Stokes is a former Australian rules football player who played with the Hawthorn Football Club in the Australian Football League. Stokes was recruited to the Hawks via the 2008 AFL rookie draft, selected at pick 54. He made his AFL debut in the opening round of the 2008 AFL season, alongside fellow Northern Territorian Cyril Rioli. Stokes played all his junior football with the Darwin Football Club in the Northern Territory Football League (NTFL). Stokes is a former captain of the Northern Territory under age state team.

Stokes relatives are his father's maternal cousin Andrew McLeod and his father's paternal cousins Greg, Gilbert and Adrian McAdam. His father Steven and great-uncle Don Stokes are both former Nichols Medal winners, the best and fairest award in the NTFL. His grandfather Sam Stokes, great grandfather Ali Ahmat and great-great-grandfather Put AhMat have all played for the Darwin along with many other family members. Cameron's uncle Frank Stokes also played for the Manly Sea Eagles in the New South Wales Rugby League for many years.

After playing 9 games in 2008, including the qualifying final, Stokes missed out on the preliminary and Hawthorn's 2008 AFL Grand Final victory due to a hamstring injury. Stokes played 10 games in 2009 but again had hamstring and shoulder problems and then ruptured his ACL at the end of the year with Box Hill. He was in rehab for most of the 2010 season, and subsequently delisted at the end of 2010.

== Statistics ==
Legend
G	Goals	K	Kicks	D	Disposals	T	Tackles
B	Behinds	H	Handballs	M	Marks

Season	Team	No.	Games	Totals							Averages (per game)							Votes
Season	Team	No.	Games	G	B	K	H	D	M	T	G	B	K	H	D	M	T	Votes
2008	Hawthorn	44	9	6	4	44	47	91	26	30	0.7	0.4	4.9	5.2	10.1	2.9	3.3	0
2009	Hawthorn	44	10	2	4	32	58	90	22	17	0.2	0.4	3.2	5.8	9.0	2.2	1.7	0
2010	Hawthorn	44	1	0	0	0	3	3	0	6	0.0	0.0	0.0	3.0	3.0	0.0	6.0	0
Career			20	8	8	76	108	184	48	53	0.4	0.4	3.8	5.4	9.2	2.4	2.7	0
