= Shane McAdam =

Australian rules footballer (born 1995)

Personal information
- Born: 28 May 1995 (age 31); Halls Creek, Western Australia
- Draft: 2018 pre-draft selection
- Debut: 28 June 2020, Adelaide vs. Brisbane, at The Gabba
- Height: 183 cm (6 ft 0 in)
- Weight: 79 kg (174 lb)
- Position: Forward

Playing career^{1}
Years	Club	Games (Goals)
2019–2023	Adelaide	50 (72)
2024–2026	Melbourne	3 (1)
Total		53 (73)
- ^{1} Playing statistics correct to the end of 2024.

Shane McAdam (born 28 May 1995) is a former Australian rules footballer who played for the Adelaide Football Club and the Melbourne Football Club in the Australian Football League (AFL).

== Early football ==
McAdam played for the Claremont Football Club. He later played for the Sturt Football Club in the SANFL. He debuted for Sturt in the 1st round of the 2018 SANFL season. McAdam kicked 23 goals in his season with Sturt.

== AFL career ==
=== Adelaide (2019–2023) ===
McAdam was traded by Carlton to Adelaide in 2018, as a mature-aged pre-draft access selection, as part of a deal involving the trade of former Adelaide player Mitch McGovern. McAdam debuted in the Crows' thirty-seven point loss against the Brisbane Lions in the fourth round of the 2020 AFL season. On debut, McAdam picked up 5 disposals, 2 marks and 4 tackles.

In the round 2, 2021 match against Sydney at the SCG, McAdam kicked a career-best four goals in a pure small-forward performance which included a flurry of three goals in a row in the fourth quarter. In 2021 and 2022, McAdam played 15 games each, totalling 48 goals across the two seasons in what would become the best years of his short career. In 2023, McAdam received a three match ban for rough conduct against GWS's Jacob Wehr in the round one loss.

=== Melbourne (2024–2026) ===
Following the 2023 AFL season, McAdam requested a trade to Melbourne, and was traded on 17 October. McAdam struggled with injuries at Melbourne, and announced his retirement in May 2026 after only managing three games at Melbourne across two and a half seasons.

== Personal life ==
He is the nephew of former Australian rules footballers Gilbert McAdam, Adrian McAdam, Adam McAdam, and Greg McAdam.

== Statistics ==
Updated to the end of the 2026 season.

Legend
G	Goals	K	Kicks	D	Disposals	T	Tackles
B	Behinds	H	Handballs	M	Marks

Season	Team	No.	Games	Totals							Averages (per game)							Votes
Season	Team	No.	Games	G	B	K	H	D	M	T	G	B	K	H	D	M	T	Votes
2019	Adelaide	23	0	—	—	—	—	—	—	—	—	—	—	—	—	—	—	0
2020 (Note: The 2020 season was played with 17 home-and-away matches per team (down from 22) and 16-minute quarters with time on (down from 20-minute quarters with time on) due to the impact of the COVID-19 pandemic.)	Adelaide	23	13	12	12	79	42	121	46	38	0.9	0.9	6.1	3.2	9.3	3.5	2.9	0
2021	Adelaide	23	15	25	11	79	48	127	56	34	1.7	0.7	5.3	3.2	8.5	3.7	2.3	0
2022	Adelaide	23	15	23	13	94	68	162	65	44	1.5	0.9	6.3	4.5	10.8	4.3	2.9	0
2023	Adelaide	23	7	12	4	38	30	68	30	23	1.7	0.6	5.4	4.3	9.7	4.3	3.3	0
2024	Melbourne	23	3	1	2	12	14	26	10	9	0.3	0.7	4.0	4.7	8.7	3.3	3.0	0
2025	Melbourne	23	0	—	—	—	—	—	—	—	—	—	—	—	—	—	—	0
2026	Melbourne	23	0	—	—	—	—	—	—	—	—	—	—	—	—	—	—	0
Career			53	73	42	302	202	504	207	148	1.4	0.8	5.7	3.8	9.5	3.9	2.8	0
