= Wanganeen =

Wanganeen is a surname. Notable people with the surname include:

- Derick Wanganeen (born 1991), Australian rules footballer
- Gavin Wanganeen (born 1973), Australian rules footballer
- Natasha Wanganeen, Aboriginal Australian actress
- Tex Wanganeen, (born 2003), Australian rules footballer
