= Percy Johnson (disambiguation) =

Percy Johnson (1933–2021) was an Australian rules footballer.

Percy Johnson may also refer to:

- Percy Johnson (1912–1983), Canadian Catholic priest after whom Monsignor Percy Johnson Catholic High School, Ontario, Canada, is named
- Percy Johnson (footballer, born 1930) (1930–2014), Australian rules footballer

== See also ==
- Percy Johnson-Marshall (1915–1993), British urban designer, regional planner and academic
