= Indigenous Team of the Century =

Australian rules football fantasy team

The Indigenous Team of the Century was selected in 2005 to recognise the role of Indigenous Australians in Australian rules football. Graham Farmer was named as the team's captain, while Barry Cable was selected as the team's coach. Eight of the players were still active in the Australian Football League (AFL) at the time of being selected.

== Description ==
The Indigenous Team of the Century was announced in 2005 to celebrate the 100th anniversary of the first senior-level game played by an indigenous player in the Victorian/Australian Football League, Fitzroy's Joe Johnson.

The panel's final selection from a shortlist of 35 consisted of 24 players, 19 of whom have represented clubs competing in the Victorian/Australian Football League, whilst the remaining five were picked for their record in either the South Australian National Football League or the West Australian Football League.

== The Team ==
Indigenous Team of the Century (Australian rules football)
B:	Chris Johnson (Fitzroy, Brisbane)	Darryl White (Brisbane)	Bill Dempsey (West Perth)
HB:	Gavin Wanganeen (Essendon, Port Adelaide)	Adam Goodes (Sydney)	Norm McDonald (Essendon)
C:	Peter Matera (South Fremantle, West Coast)	Maurice Rioli (South Fremantle, Richmond)	Michael Long (Essendon, West Torrens)
HF:	Nicky Winmar (South Fremantle, St Kilda, Western Bulldogs)	Stephen Michael (South Fremantle)	Syd Jackson (East Perth, Carlton)
F:	Chris Lewis (Claremont, West Coast)	Michael O'Loughlin (Sydney, Central Districts)	Jim Krakouer (Claremont, North Melbourne, St Kilda)
Foll:	Graham 'Polly' Farmer (Captain) (East Perth, Geelong, West Perth)	Andrew McLeod (Adelaide, Port Adelaide)	Barry Cable (Perth, East Perth, North Melbourne)
Int:	Michael McLean (Footscray, Brisbane)	Byron Pickett (North Melbourne, Port Adelaide, Melbourne)	Michael Graham (Sturt)
Int:	David Kantilla (South Adelaide)	Ted Kilmurray (East Perth)	Peter Burgoyne (Port Adelaide)
Coach:	Barry Cable (former coach of North Melbourne)		

An umpire, Glenn James, was also selected.

== The selection panel ==
The Indigenous Team of the Century selection panel consisted of:

- Patrick Dodson (AFL Indigenous Foundation board member)
- Ernie Dingo (media personality)
- Glenn James (former umpire)
- Kevin Sheedy (Essendon Football Club coach)
- Kevin Sheehan (AFL national talent manager)
- Mike Sheahan (journalist)
- Michelangelo Rucci (journalist)
- Col Hutchinson (AFL historian)

== Similar teams ==
The AFL announced its Team of the Century in 1996, which also featured Graham Farmer in the lead ruck position. Other ethnic based teams such as the Greek Team of the Century and Italian Team of the Century have also been announced. Many individual clubs have also named teams of the century, with South Fremantle Football Club announcing their own Indigenous Team of the Century in July 2009. The National Rugby League announced their Indigenous Team of the Century in 2008.

== See also ==
- Dreamtime at the 'G
- Indigenous All-Stars (Australian rules football)
