= Trent Cummings =

Australian rules footballer (born 1973)

Personal information
- Full name: Trent Cummings
- Born: 28 December 1973 (age 52)
- Original team: Central District
- Draft: 6th, 1993 AFL draft
- Height: 182 cm (6 ft 0 in)
- Weight: 84 kg (185 lb)

Playing career^{1}
Years	Club	Games (Goals)
1994–1996	Fitzroy	27 (18)
1997	West Coast Eagles	2 (1)
Total		29 (19)
- ^{1} Playing statistics correct to the end of 1997.

Trent Cummings (born 28 December 1973) is a former Australian rules footballer who played with Fitzroy and the West Coast Eagles in the Australian Football League (AFL).

Cummings, the third member of his family to play for Fitzroy, was seen mostly on a wing or at half forward. His great-grandfather, Joe Johnson, was a Fitzroy footballer and credited with being the first Indigenous Australian to play in the Victorian Football League. An elder brother, Robert Cummings, also played for Fitzroy and their father, Percy, was a Hawthorn player.

The sixth selection of the 1993 AFL draft, Cummings spent three seasons with Fitzroy and despite making 27 appearances he only played in three wins. At the end of 1996, the Brisbane Lions were formed and Cummings didn't make their squad, instead secured by the West Coast Eagles with pick 57 in the national draft despite having recently undergone a knee reconstruction.

He played just two games at his new club in 1997 and instead spent most of the year in the Western Australian Football League (WAFL) with Peel Thunder. A knee injury, sustained in a practice match during the 1998 pre-season, ended his league career.

In 2003, he sued both the Eagles and Subiaco Oval authorities for loss of earning, and received a six-figure settlement.
