= Robert Cummings (footballer) =

Australian rules footballer

Personal information
- Full name: Robert Cummings
- Born: 20 September 1969 (age 57)
- Original teams: Norwood, (SANFL)
- Draft: No. 15, 1990 Preseason Draft

Playing career^{1}
| Years | Club | Games (Goals) |
| 1990 | Fitzroy | 1 (0) |
- ^{1} Playing statistics correct to the end of 1990.

Robert Cummings (born 20 September 1969) is a former Australian rules footballer who played for Fitzroy in the Australian Football League (AFL) in 1990. He was recruited from the Central District Football Club in the South Australian National Football League (SANFL) to Hawthorn, but did not play a senior game for the Hawks. In 1990 he was selected by Fitzroy with the 15th selection in the 1990 Preseason Draft.

His great-grandfather, Joe Johnson, was a Fitzroy footballer and credited with being the first Indigenous Australian to play in the Victorian Football League. A younger brother, Trent Cummings, also played for Fitzroy and their father, Percy, was a Hawthorn player. Their grandfather, Percy Johnson played for North Melbourne.
