= Ted Lovett =

Australian rules footballer

Personal information
- Full name: Edward Lovett
- Born: 15 February 1941 (age 85)
- Original team: North Ballarat
- Height: 5 ft 9 in (175 cm)
- Weight: 11 st 0 lb (70 kg)

Playing career^{1}
Years	Club	Games (Goals)
1963–1964	Fitzroy	9 (2)
- ^{1} Playing statistics correct to the end of 1964.

Ted Lovett (born 15 February 1941) is a former Australian rules footballer who played with Fitzroy in the Victorian Football League (VFL).

Lovett played two games for Fitzroy in the 1963 VFL season, on a permit, and a further seven in 1964. He finished the 1963 season back at North Ballarat and won the first of two Henderson Medal, the other coming in 1965. He is an Indigenous Australian.

== Early life ==
Lovett is the son of Alf Egan, the first Indigenous player for the Carlton Football Club, and Gertie, of the Gunditjmara tribe. He grew up in Fitzroy, Victoria, and was made a ward of the state against his family wishes. He attended school until Grade 5. In 1955, at age 14, Ted and his non-Aboriginal friend of the same age went to Mildura to go fruit picking, but they were picked up by the police and locked up. The non-Aboriginal boy's parents were notified and told to collect him, however, Ted's mother was not notified. Ted commented:

From Mildura I was sent to the Ballarat Gaol with adult prisoners and then went to Court and was made a State Ward. For the next seven years I was in and out of boys’ homes including Turana Boys Home, Bayswater Salvation Army Boys Home, and Langi Kal Kal, Youth Training Centre. The treatment in the Boys’ Homes was unjust and inhumane. I was treated cruelly in the homes; no child should have been there. I would escape but was just sent back again.

== Community service ==
In the 1970s Lovett worked for Aboriginal Affairs. He played a key role in setting up the Ballarat and District Aboriginal Cooperative, which specialises in Aboriginal health, welfare and community development. He also worked with eye doctor Fred Hollows.

In 2017, Lovett was awarded the Order of Australia Medal for services to the Indigenous community in south-west Victoria.
