= Darryl White =

Australian rules footballer

Personal information
- Full name: Darryl White
- Born: 12 June 1973 (age 53); Alice Springs, Northern Territory, Australia
- Original team: Pioneer (CAFL)
- Height: 189 cm (6 ft 2 in)
- Weight: 85 kg (187 lb)

Playing career^{1}
Years	Club	Games (Goals)
1992–1996	Brisbane Bears	90 (106)
1997–2005	Brisbane Lions	178 (59)
Total		268 (165)

Representative team honours
Years	Team	Games (Goals)
1993	QLD/NT	1 (1)
1994–2007	Indigenous All-Stars	4
1995–1998	Allies	4 (3)
- ^{1} Playing statistics correct to the end of 2005.

Career highlights
- 3× AFL Premiership player 2001, 2002, 2003; Named in Indigenous Team of the Century at fullback 2005; Named captain Indigenous All-Stars 2005; Allies State of origin representative 1995, 1996, 1997, 1998; Qld/NT State of origin representative 1993; Kicked AFL Goal of the Year 1992; Bears best first-year player 1992; NT and All-Australian Under-17 representative 1990

Darryl White (born 12 June 1973) is an Australian rules footballer whose career with the Brisbane Bears and Brisbane Lions in the Australian Football League (AFL) lasted from 1992 to 2005.

An Indigenous Australian, in 2005 he was named at fullback in the Australian rules football Indigenous Team of the Century.

Beyond his AFL career, White continues to be involved in football, having forged one of the most successful careers of any Australian rules footballer, with six premierships across three competitions (AFL, NTAFL and QSL). He is an indigenous role model for many aboriginal Australians.

== Early career ==
White, who is of Indigenous Australian (Arrernte) descent, grew up in Alice Springs in central Australia, playing junior football for the Pioneer Football Club. Like many of his peers, he had a difficult adolescence, but he had a natural talent for football. In 1990, he represented the Northern Territory at the Teal Cup under-17 national football carnival held in Brisbane, where he came to the attention of Brisbane Bears coach Robert Walls and his football manager Scott Clayton. Impressed with his clean ball-handling skills, his leap, and his ability to play tall, the Bears drafted him at the end of the season with a priority draft pick from their Queensland–Northern Territory recruiting zone.

== AFL career ==
Despite initial reluctance to move to the Bears—a club which, in White's words, "only won two games a year"—the future football star was persuaded to give the club a chance (turning up to his first training session in a purple Los Angeles Lakers singlet and bouncing a basketball). He found the transition from Alice Springs football to training under strict disciplinarian Walls difficult once there; for example, on one occasion during an 8-kilometre (5.0 mi) cycle up a mountain, he hurled his bike off a cliff, telling his coach he'd come to play football, not ride bikes.

His first season of football was an announcement of a rare talent, leading the Brownlow Medal count after three rounds with two best-on-ground performances and kicking the official goal of the year with his first-ever goal. However, White suffered continual problems with homesickness. At the end of the season, he immediately returned to Alice Springs and did not return for the start of pre-season training a month later. When Walls telephoned him to ask him if he was coming back, the response was: "I'm really busy—call me again in a couple of weeks."

White soon became a crowd favourite, with a marking ability well beyond that which his height would normally allow. Fans grew to instantly recognise his loping running style, his casual but pinpoint foot passing, and his idiosyncratic pose after a mark, holding the ball aloft on its point as if to show the world he'd caught it. He even found citywide fame when a photo of a spectacular White mark was published on the cover of the 1996 Brisbane White Pages telephone directory (a marketing coup for the struggling club).

White's vertical jump allowed his coaches to take advantage of his flexibility by positioning him in a variety of key positions—even, when injuries to teammates demanded it, the ruck. White's opponents were often much taller and stronger, but his leap and flexibility allowed him to hold his own in such contests.

White survived the 1996 merger between Fitzroy and the Bears which formed the Brisbane Lions, and was an integral member of its first premiership victory in 2001 playing off half-back. He also played in the Lions' flag wins in 2002 and 2003, as well as its Grand Final loss in 2004.

By 1996, White had become an inspiration to other indigenous players, especially those from his former home of the Northern Territory. On one occasion, he even found himself approached by a young indigenous player from a rival club immediately after a match who asked him to pose for a photograph with him before leaving the ground. His progression from erratic youth to responsible adult had been guided by mentor and former teammate, fellow aborigine Michael McLean. A trip to South Africa in 1997 and a 36-hour jail term for assault in the same year (later overturned on appeal) opened his eyes to what his life could have been. "I used to be out stealing handbags," he said in 2001. "I was just starting to get into bigger and better stuff. Back then, I was stealing BMWs. Luckily I got caught and got sent away for six months in [a] juvenile detention centre in Perth. Look at me now, it's all changed."

In 2005, he was named captain of the Indigenous All-Stars, an all-Aboriginal team, selected to play the Western Bulldogs in Darwin that February. White was devastated when he ruptured a thumb ligament at Lions training in the weeks before the game and was unable to play. Desperate to play a part, he flew in for the occasion and acted as the team's runner during the game.

However, in 2003 and 2004, his form had been patchy, spending an increasing amount of time in the club's seconds side, and at the end of each season there was increasing speculation that he would retire. The Lions continued to show their loyalty to the player who had served them so well and re-signed him for the 2005 season, but he added only ten games to his career tally. In the second-last home-and-away game of that season, with the Lions struggling to make the finals, White played in the seconds and kicked nine goals, ensuring his recall for one last game. The Lions were thrashed by St Kilda by a record 139 points in Melbourne in a disappointing finish to a spectacular and entertaining career.

In the last quarter of his final game, White fielded a mark at half-forward and held it skyward in trademark fashion. He then drilled a no-look pass forward to Jared Brennan, a player who had idolised White as a boy. Brennan goaled. White's bewildered teammates flocked around him to offer congratulations. After the siren, he was carried from the ground by indigenous teammates Chris Johnson and Ash McGrath, signifying the respect in which he had been held by his community.

White's contribution to football and his community was recognised in 2005 when he was named at full-back in the Indigenous Team of the Century, alongside premiership teammate Johnson and former mentor McLean. His Brisbane captain, Michael Voss, said that it was important that White be kept involved in football. "He has taught me a lot and helped me try to understand their indigenous culture. He will leave the game with a lot of respect from his teammates and fellow players."

== Statistics ==
Legend
G	Goals	K	Kicks	D	Disposals	T	Tackles
B	Behinds	H	Handballs	M	Marks

Season	Team	No.	Games	Totals							Averages (per game)						
Season	Team	No.	Games	G	B	K	H	D	M	T	G	B	K	H	D	M	T
1992	Brisbane Bears	29	19	17	8	155	122	277	68	30	0.9	0.4	8.2	6.4	14.6	3.6	1.6
1993	Brisbane Bears	29	12	13	4	72	67	139	37	25	1.1	0.3	6.0	5.6	11.6	3.1	2.1
1994	Brisbane Bears	33	15	10	6	93	91	184	56	20	0.7	0.4	6.2	6.1	12.3	3.7	1.3
1995	Brisbane Bears	33	22	29	17	169	122	291	100	39	1.3	0.8	7.7	5.5	13.2	4.5	1.8
1996	Brisbane Bears	33	22	37	11	194	111	305	87	40	1.7	0.5	8.8	5.0	13.9	4.0	1.8
1997	Brisbane Lions	33	19	3	5	164	92	256	76	46	0.2	0.3	8.6	4.8	13.5	4.0	2.4
1998	Brisbane Lions	33	22	19	9	202	121	323	100	40	0.9	0.4	9.2	5.5	14.7	4.5	1.8
1999	Brisbane Lions	33	25	14	9	240	112	352	129	46	0.6	0.4	9.6	4.5	14.1	5.2	1.8
2000	Brisbane Lions	33	23	3	0	212	114	326	106	41	0.1	0.0	9.2	5.0	14.2	4.6	1.8
2001	Brisbane Lions	33	22	1	1	210	130	340	115	31	0.0	0.0	9.5	5.9	15.5	5.2	1.4
2002	Brisbane Lions	33	21	11	3	130	83	213	86	39	0.5	0.1	6.2	4.0	10.1	4.1	1.9
2003	Brisbane Lions	33	21	5	2	150	88	238	96	25	0.2	0.1	7.1	4.2	11.3	4.6	1.2
2004	Brisbane Lions	33	15	0	1	103	62	165	52	17	0.0	0.1	6.9	4.1	11.0	3.5	1.3
2005	Brisbane Lions	33	10	3	1	69	38	107	42	16	0.3	0.1	6.9	3.8	10.7	4.2	1.6
Career			268	165	77	2163	1353	3516	1150	455	0.6	0.3	8.1	5.0	13.1	4.3	1.7

== Post AFL career ==
In the 2005/06 NTFL Season, White played for the Darwin Football Club, playing in a premiership team. In 2006/07, he switched to the Southern Districts Football Club, where he followed up with another NTFL premiership.

In 2007, he moved back to Queensland, where he played in a premiership with the Queensland State League's Mount Gravatt Football Club, making it his sixth premiership across three competitions (AFL, NTAFL and QSL).

White is a passionate supporter of indigenous education. In 2008 he accepted an appointment as Indigenous Support Officer at Marist College Ashgrove, where he will assist indigenous Marist students achieve their goals.

In 2011, White played for Nyah-Nyah West in the Central Murray Football League in northern Victoria. He joined St Mary's in the 2011/12 NTFL season. In December 2011, White was temporarily deregistered for life from playing football under the Player Deregistration Policy, after a one match suspension for striking brought his career total suspensions to sixteen weeks – the threshold for deregistration. White appealed for re-registration, and the ban was overturned on 23 January 2012, with White permitted to return to playing, but additionally required to engage in community work and mentoring. He continued with Nyah-Nyah West until 2014, and played the 2014/15 NTFL season with Darwin before retiring at age 41 after 26 years of senior football.

His son Darryl McDowell-White is also a Brisbane Lion after being drafted by the Brisbane Lions as a category B rookie in November 2022, having previously played a stint in college basketball in the USA.

His other son William McDowell-White is a professional basketball player, who currently plays for the New Zealand Breakers, and has played for the Sydney Kings, Houston Rockets, and also in Germany.
