= Michael O'Loughlin =

Australian rules footballer, born 1977

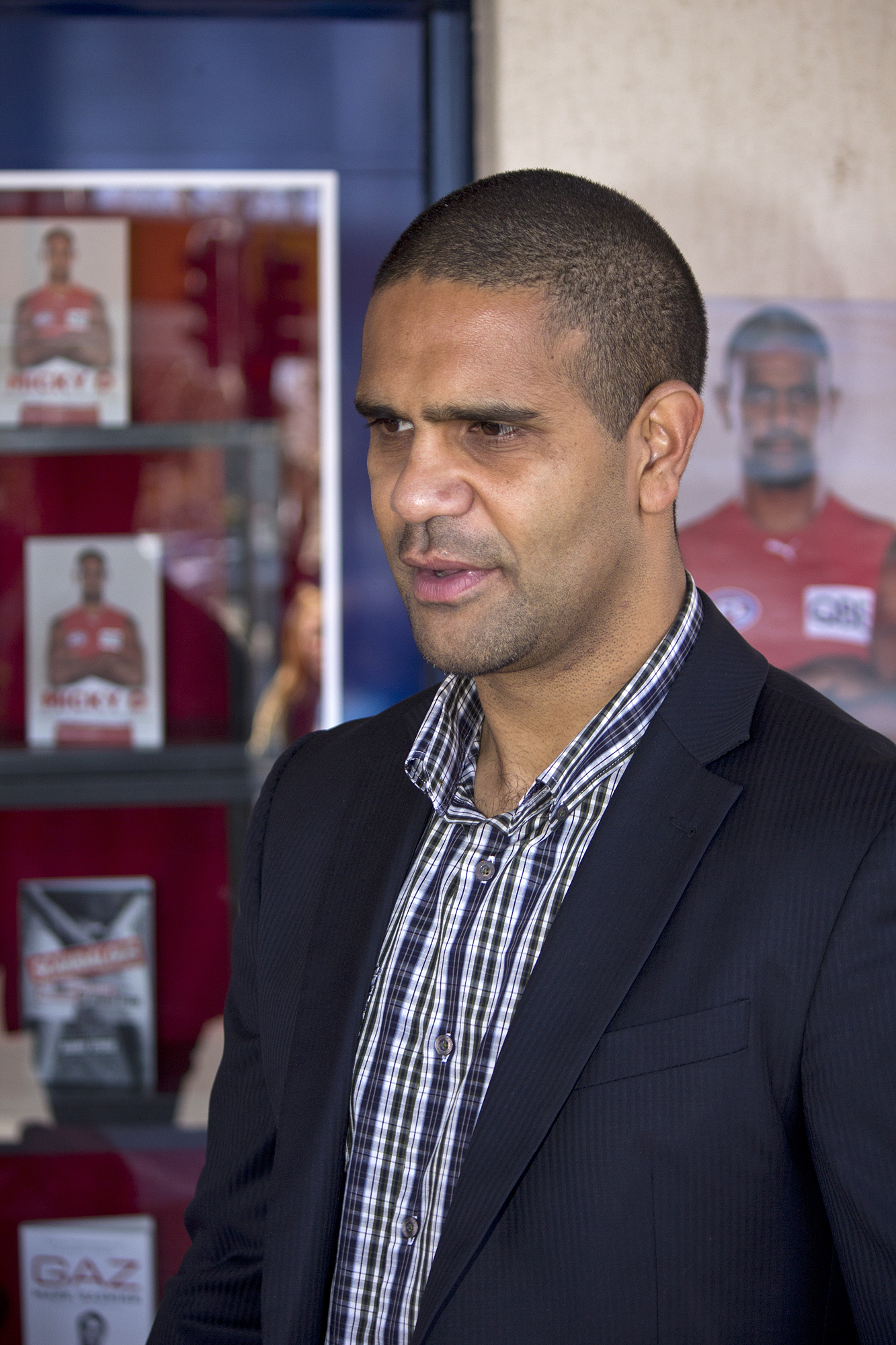
- O'Loughlin at an autographing session in September 2012

Personal information
- Full name: Michael Kevin O'Loughlin
- Nicknames: Micky O, Magic Mick, Paradise
- Born: 20 February 1977 (age 49); Adelaide, South Australia
- Original team: Central District (SANFL)
- Draft: 40th overall, 1994; Sydney
- Height: 189 cm (6 ft 2 in)
- Weight: 90 kg (198 lb)
- Position: Forward

Playing career^{1}
Years	Club	Games (Goals)
1995–2009	Sydney	303 (521)

Representative team honours
Years	Team	Games (Goals)
1997–1999	South Australia	3 (?)

Coaching career^{3}
Years	Club	Games (W–L–D)
2013	Indigenous All-Stars	(1–0–0)
- ^{1} Playing statistics correct to the end of 2009.^{3} Coaching statistics correct as of 2013.

Career highlights
- Club: 2x All-Australian: 1997, 2000; Sydney Best & Fairest: 1998; AFL Premiership: 2005; 2x Sydney leading goalkicker: 2000–01; 2x Deadlys Award: 2005, 2009; Deadlys Male Sports Person of the Year: 2009; Madden Medal: 2009; AFL Rising Star nominee: 1995; Australian Football Hall of Fame; Indigenous Team of the Century; Representative: Fos Williams Medal: 1998

Michael Kevin O'Loughlin (born 20 February 1977) is a former professional Australian rules footballer, who played his entire Australian Football League career with the Sydney Swans.

O'Loughlin was named a member of the Indigenous Team of the Century. He was the third player with Indigenous heritage to play 300 AFL games. He twice achieved All-Australian selection, played for Australia twice in the International Rules Series, and was a Fos Williams Medallist as best player for South Australia in State of Origin. O'Loughlin was the first Sydney Swans player to play more than 300 career games. In 303 games he kicked 521 career goals.

== Early life ==
Michael Kevin O'Loughlin was born on 20 February 1977. His parents never married, so he was given his mother's maiden name of O'Loughlin, which came from her Irish great-great-great-grandfather. He supported Carlton Blues growing up. O'Loughlin's ancestors were Czech Jews, Aboriginal Australian (Kaurna and Ngarrindjeri), Irish and English. He is a descendant (the great-great-great-grandson) of Kudnarto (c.1832–1855), the Kaurna woman who made history by being the first Aboriginal woman to marry a British settler in the colony of South Australia in 1848.

He grew up in Adelaide, South Australia, and first played junior football with Central District in the SANFL.

== AFL career ==
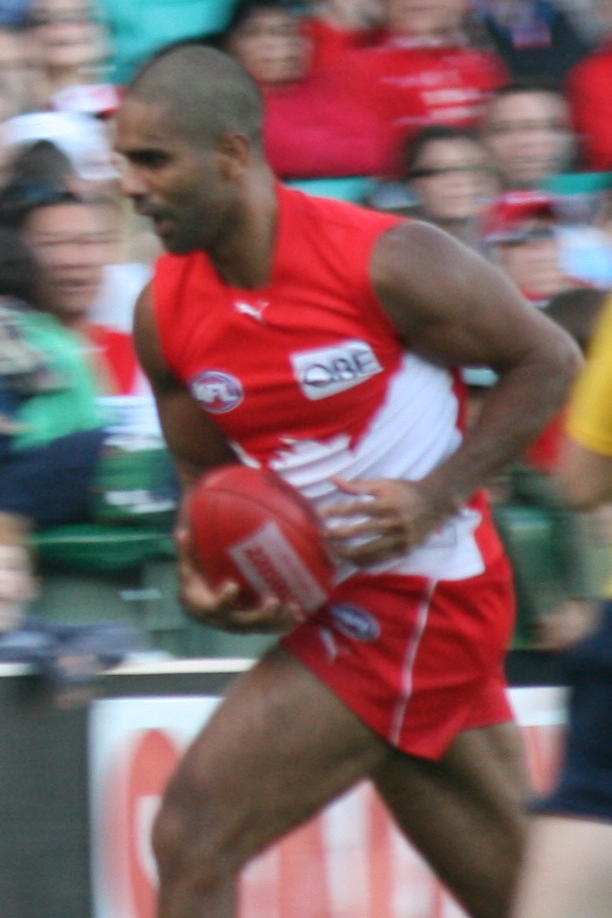
O'Loughlin with Sydney in 2009

Selected in the third round of the 1994 National Draft, O'Loughlin played 12 senior games for the Swans in 1995 and earned an AFL Rising Star award nomination. The following year, he was a key player in the team that won the minor premiership and then lost to North Melbourne in the grand final. He was the games record holder for the Swans, passing John Rantall's VFL/AFL record in Round 14 of the 2007 season and Bill Windley's 102-year-old overall club record in the Elimination Final of that year, until he was overtaken by his cousin Adam Goodes. He became the first Sydney Swans/South Melbourne player to break the 300 games milestone in Round 19, 2009.

O'Loughlin played the majority of his early football in a half-forward flanker role, where his combination of speed, strength and agility made him a difficult player for opposing teams to match up against. He was known by the nickname "Magic" throughout his career, in recognition of his capacity to play football so skillfully that it could sometimes seem he had "cast a spell" on his opponents. He was also known by the nickname, "Micky O". In the latter part of his career, he was primarily used as Sydney's full-forward. In 2000 and 2001, he was the club's leading goalkicker. He was club best and fairest in 1998 and runner-up in 2000. He was selected in the All Australian Team in 1997 and 2000. When State of Origin matches were still being played, he represented his state on several occasions, receiving the Fos Williams Medal for best South Australian player in 1998.

In 2005, he was selected alongside Sydney Swans teammate and cousin Adam Goodes in the Indigenous Team of the Century. O'Loughlin was chosen for the full-forward position. He described this honour as the highlight of his career, alongside the 2005 premiership.

O'Loughlin, the only player remaining in the team from the 1996 loss, played strongly during the 2005 grand final, including a number of exceptional marks. However, and uncharacteristically, his kicking for goal during the game was inaccurate.

In 2006, O'Loughlin continued to be a key part of the Swans' line-up, including playing a decisive role in the qualifying and preliminary finals that put the Swans into the grand final for the second consecutive year. In the close qualifying Final against the West Coast Eagles at Subiaco Oval, O'Loughlin ran into an open goal, then carried on to the fence and roared into the faces of some rather stunned-looking Eagles' fans from a few inches away. The moment is captured in Jamie Cooper's painting the Game That Made Australia, commissioned by the AFL in 2008 to celebrate the 150th anniversary of the sport.

In the 2006 Grand Final, O'Loughlin played well, kicking 3.1 (19). He continued to play consistently well for Sydney through the balance of his career.

On 23 June 2009, O'Loughlin announced that at the end of the 2009 season, he would retire. He played his 300th game in round 19 at the MCG against the Richmond Tigers.

== Recognition and awards ==
- AFL Rising Star nominee 1995
- All-Australian 1997, 2000
- International Rules Series 1997, 2000
- Fos Williams Medal 1998
- Bob Skilton Medal 1998
- Best and Fairest for Sydney (AFL) 1998
- Runner up, Best and Fairest Sydney (AFL) 2000
- Sydney Swans Leading goalkicker 2000, 2001
- Sydney Swans Premiership player 2005
- Sydney Swans Hall of Fame
- Outstanding achievement in AFL 2005 (The Deadlys)
- Indigenous Team of the Century member
- Outstanding achievement in AFL 2009 (The Deadlys)
- Male Sportsperson of the Year 2009 (The Deadlys)
- AFLPA Madden Medallist
- Australian Football Hall of Fame inductee, 2015
- SA Football Hall of Fame inductee, 2017

== Statistics ==
Legend
G	Goals	K	Kicks	D	Disposals	T	Tackles
B	Behinds	H	Handballs	M	Marks

*10 games required to be eligible.

Season	Team	No.	Games	Totals							Averages (per game)						
Season	Team	No.	Games	G	B	K	H	D	M	T	G	B	K	H	D	M	T
1995	Sydney	38	11	12	4	62	52	114	24	16	1.1	0.4	5.6	4.7	10.4	2.2	1.5
1996	Sydney	19	25	21	14	228	153	381	109	45	0.8	0.6	9.1	6.1	15.2	4.4	1.8
1997	Sydney	19	23	26	14	270	117	387	85	41	1.1	0.6	11.7	5.1	16.8	3.7	1.8
1998	Sydney	19	24	40	25	289	130	419	129	28	1.7	1.0	12.0	5.4	17.5	5.4	1.2
1999	Sydney	19	18	26	18	167	69	236	81	20	1.4	1.0	9.3	3.8	13.1	4.5	1.1
2000	Sydney	19	22	53	24	282	122	404	142	23	2.4	1.1	12.8	5.5	18.4	6.5	1.0
2001	Sydney	19	23	35	29	279	111	390	128	36	1.5	1.3	12.1	4.8	17.0	5.6	1.6
2002	Sydney	19	19	30	11	181	106	287	92	33	1.6	0.6	9.5	5.6	15.1	4.8	1.7
2003	Sydney	19	16	41	20	132	55	187	90	16	2.6	1.3	8.3	3.4	11.7	5.6	1.0
2004	Sydney	19	18	38	18	144	40	184	99	19	2.1	1.0	8.0	2.2	10.2	5.5	1.1
2005	Sydney	19	23	52	26	188	68	256	104	30	2.3	1.1	8.2	3.0	11.1	4.5	1.3
2006	Sydney	19	25	47	32	219	82	301	138	37	1.9	1.3	8.8	3.3	12.0	5.5	1.5
2007	Sydney	19	23	40	14	182	84	266	112	32	1.7	0.6	7.9	3.7	11.6	4.9	1.4
2008	Sydney	19	16	36	21	126	66	192	90	19	2.3	1.3	7.9	4.1	12.0	5.6	1.2
2009	Sydney	19	17	24	16	131	63	194	95	30	1.4	0.9	7.7	3.7	11.4	5.6	1.8
Career			303	521	286	2880	1318	4198	1518	425	1.7	0.9	9.5	4.3	13.8	5.0	1.4

== Post-AFL career ==
O'Loughlin was awarded the 2009 AFL Players' Association Madden for his on and off-field contributions to the game.

In 2010 O'Loughlin coached the Flying Boomerangs Indigenous side during their Cape Town tour, leading the side to victory against the South Africa National Australian Rules Football Team. He was later named coach of the World 18 for the AFL National Under 16 Championships.

In 2011 he was named as coach of the Indigenous All-Stars team for their biennial game, this time against the Richmond Tigers. O'Loughlin also represented South Australia against Victoria in the State of Origin Slowdown charity match at the Adelaide Oval on 3 October 2011. Both teams were composed of retired players with the match supporting both the Little Heroes Foundation and the Reach Foundation youth charities started by former Melbourne Demons star player, the late Jim Stynes.

=== The GO Foundation ===
In September 2009 he launched the Goodes O'Loughlin Foundation, or GO Foundation, along with his cousin and co-chairman Adam Goodes and their friend James Gallichan, in Dareton, NSW, where it was involved in various community programmes for the local Aboriginal population. In 2014, it started focusing on education for Indigenous Australians and established a board of directors. Founding partners include the Sydney Swans, Allens Linklaters, QBE Insurance and KPMG Australia. After starting with a few scholarships to independent schools, by 2021 GO had expanded into 26 mostly public schools, as well as five universities.

== Off-field controversy ==
In 2000, it was alleged that O'Loughlin had been present during the rape of a woman in a park in Adelaide by two other AFL players, Adam Heuskes and Peter Burgoyne. O'Loughlin was said to have been "present before or during the incident, but not directly involved in it. O'Loughlin was neither charged nor questioned by police but Burgoyne and Heuskes were both charged with rape. The case, however, did not go to court as the Director of Public Prosecutions, Paul Rofe, said there was "no reasonable prospect of conviction on any criminal charge" due to a lack of witnesses. Despite this, the three players made a $200,000 cash payment to the alleged victim. The incident came to public light when it was examined on the ABC investigative program Four Corners in 2004.
