= Frank Stokes (rugby league) =

Australian rugby league footballer

Personal information
- Full name: Frank Stokes
- Born: 24 April 1972 (age 53); Darwin, Northern Territory, Australia

Playing information
- Position: Fullback, Wing
Club
Years	Team	Pld	T	G	FG	P
1990–94	Manly Sea Eagles	51	17	2	0	72
- Source: As of 23 January 2023

Frank Stokes (born 24 April 1972) is an Australian former professional rugby league footballer who played in the 1990s. He played for Manly-Warringah in the NSWRL competition.

== Playing career ==
Stokes was initially spotted as a 17-year old by Bob Fulton after a pre-season trip to Darwin. Stokes made his first grade debut for Manly in round 1 of the 1990 NSWRL season against Balmain where he started at fullback in a 14-12 victory at Leichhardt Oval. The following week, he scored his first try in the top grade against Newcastle at Brookvale Oval. In 1991, Stokes finished as Manly's top try scorer with twelve tries and played in both of the clubs finals games against North Sydney and Canberra. In his three remaining years at Manly, Stokes played mostly in reserve grade and was used as more of a back up player in the Manly squad. At the end of 1994, Stokes was released by Manly and he returned to Darwin.
