= Greg McAdam =

Australian rules footballer

Personal information
- Born: 18 February 1961 (age 65)
- Original team: North Adelaide (SANFL)
- Draft: No. 22, 1981 interstate draft
- Height: 179 cm (5 ft 10 in)
- Weight: 81 kg (179 lb)

Playing career^{1}
Years	Club	Games (Goals)
1977–1983	North Adelaide	113 (157)
1985	St Kilda	10 (13)

Representative team honours^{2}
Years	Team	Games (Goals)
1983	Aboriginal All-Stars	1 (4)
- ^{1} Playing statistics correct to the end of 1985.^{2} Representative statistics correct as of 1983.

Greg McAdam (born 18 February 1961) is a former Australian rules footballer who played with St Kilda in the AFL in 1985, and North Adelaide and Central District in the SANFL.

McAdam is an Indigenous Australian from Alice Springs. His younger brothers Adrian and Gilbert followed him into the AFL.
