= 1993 Brownlow Medal =

- Winner: Gavin Wanganeen (Essendon); 18 votes

Television/radio coverage
- Network: Seven Network

The 1993 Brownlow Medal was the 66th year the award was presented to the player adjudged the fairest and best player during the Australian Football League (AFL) home-and-away season. Gavin Wanganeen of the Essendon Football Club won the medal by polling eighteen votes during the 1993 AFL season. Wanganeen was the first Aboriginal player to win the Brownlow Medal in the history of the award, and, at age 20, he was the youngest winner since Denis Ryan in 1936. The South Australian also added a premiership medallion to his collection after Essendon defeated Carlton in the 1993 premiership decider. Both medals were already in addition to the 1993 Michael Tuck Medal Wanganeen was awarded for being judged best on ground in the pre-season grand final.

Controversy and credibility still hang over the legitimacy of the medal win. Greg Williams of Carlton received no votes for a 44-possession game against Melbourne in Round 10. In 2006, former umpire Murray Bird verified a conversation with main umpire John Russo after the game that revealed Russo refused to give any votes to Williams.

== Leading vote-getters ==
	Player	Votes
1st	Gavin Wanganeen (Essendon)	18
2nd	Greg Williams (Carlton)	17
	Garry Hocking (Geelong)*	17
=3rd	Jason Dunstall (Hawthorn)	16
=3rd	Wayne Carey (North Melbourne)	16
=5th	Leon Cameron (Footscray)	14
=5th	Nathan Buckley (Brisbane Bears)	14
	Wayne Schwass (North Melbourne)*	14
7th	Matthew Knights (Richmond)	13
	Gary Ablett (Geelong)*	13
=8th	Robert Harvey (St Kilda)	12
=8th	Damian Monkhorst (Collingwood)	12
=8th	Jim Stynes (Melbourne)	12
=8th	Scott Wynd (Footscray)	12

* The player was ineligible to win the medal due to suspension by the AFL Tribunal during the year.
