= Alf Egan =

Australian rules footballer, born 1910

Personal information
- Full name: Alfred George Egan
- Born: 3 April 1910; Wallacedale, Victoria
- Died: 21 January 1962 (aged 51); Burnley, Victoria
- Original team: Myamyn
- Height: 191 cm (6 ft 3 in)
- Weight: 82 kg (181 lb)

Playing career^{1}
Years	Club	Games (Goals)
1931–1933	Carlton	36 (20)
1934–1935	North Melbourne	15 (7)
Total		51 (27)
- ^{1} Playing statistics correct to the end of 1935.

Alfred George Egan (3 April 1910 – 21 January 1962) was an Australian rules footballer who played with Carlton and North Melbourne in the Victorian Football League (VFL).

== Family ==
The son of Edward Egan, and Margaret Egan, née Farrell, Alfred George Egan was born into the Gunditjmara indigenous community at Wallacedale, near Condah, in Western Victoria, on 3 April 1910.

Although his brother, Allan Edmund Egan (1914–1951), was cleared from "Melbourne Boys" to the North Melbourne Seconds in 1937, he did not play any senior VFL football.

He married Gweneth May Cavenagh in 1950.

== Football ==
Egan was the first Indigenous Australian to play for Carlton and also the first to play with North Melbourne.

He appeared as a centre half-forward in the 1932 VFL Grand Final, as a replacement for an injured Jack Green, but wasn't able to steer his side to a win.

== Death ==
He died at Burnley, Victoria on 21 January 1962.

== See also ==
Gunditjmara of note
