= Tex Wanganeen =

Australian rules footballer

Personal information
- Born: 10 October 2003 (age 23)
- Debut: Round 3, 2022 (Note: He was the medical substitute on 26 March (Round 2) but did not play.), Essendon vs. Melbourne, at Melbourne Cricket Ground
- Height: 179 cm (5 ft 10 in)
- Weight: 78 kg (172 lb)
- Position: Forward

Club information
- Current club: Port Melbourne

Playing career
Years	Club	Games (Goals)
2022–2024	Essendon	5 (Note: Including 1 game as the unused medical substitute.) (1)

Tex Wanganeen (born 10 October 2003) is an Australian rules footballer who as of 2025 plays for the Port Melbourne Football Club in the Victorian Football League (VFL).

He previously played for Essendon in the Australian Football League (AFL), and is the son of Australian Football Hall of Fame member Gavin Wanganeen.

== Early life and education ==
Tex Wanganeen was born on 10 October 2003, the son of former Essendon and Port Adelaide player Gavin Wanganeen.

== Career ==
Wanganeen played junior football with Walkerville Junior Football Club in the Adelaide suburb of Walkerville, South Australia, before playing senior football with Sturt in the South Australian National Football League.

He joined Essendon as a rookie through the pre-season supplemental selection period prior to the 2022 season. He was named as the medical substitute against Brisbane in round two of the 2022 season but was not used. He started the next week against Melbourne, kicking his first goal in the third quarter.

Wanganeen was delisted by Essendon at the conclusion of the 2024 AFL season. Following his delisting, he joined the Port Melbourne Football Club in the Victorian Football League in November 2024.

== Statistics ==
Updated to the end of 2024.

Legend
G	Goals	K	Kicks	D	Disposals	T	Tackles
B	Behinds	H	Handballs	M	Marks

Season	Team	No.	Games	Totals							Averages (per game)						
Season	Team	No.	Games	G	B	K	H	D	M	T	G	B	K	H	D	M	T
2022	Essendon	40	5	1	3	7	6	13	3	10	0.2	0.6	1.4	1.2	2.6	0.6	2.0
2023	Essendon	40	0	–	–	–	–	–	–	–	–	–	–	–	–	–	–
2024	Essendon	40	0	–	–	–	–	–	–	–	–	–	–	–	–	–	–
Career			5	1	3	7	6	13	3	10	0.2	0.6	1.4	1.2	2.6	0.6	2.0
