= Gavin Wanganeen =

Australian rules footballer (born 1973)

Personal information
- Full name: Gavin Adrian Wanganeen
- Nickname: Wanga
- Born: 18 June 1973 (age 53); Mount Gambier, South Australia
- Original team: Salisbury North (SAAFL)
- Draft: No. 12, 1989 National Draft, Essendon
- Height: 181 cm (5 ft 11 in)
- Weight: 83 kg (183 lb)
- Position: Utility

Playing career^{1}
Years	Club	Games (Goals)
1990, 2006	Port Adelaide (SANFL)	27 (48)
1991–1996	Essendon	127 (64)
1997–2006	Port Adelaide	173 (138)
Total		327 (250)

Representative team honours
Years	Team	Games (Goals)
1992–1998	South Australia	8 (1)
- ^{1} Playing statistics correct to the end of 2005.

Career highlights
- 2× AFL Premiership player: (1993, 2004); SANFL Premiership player: (1990); Brownlow Medal: (1993); John Cahill Medal: (2003); Michael Tuck Medal: (1993); Port Adelaide captain: (1997–2000); 5× All-Australian team: (1992, 1993, 1995, 2001, 2003); National Football Carnival Championship (1993); Essendon Team of the Century (Back Pocket); Champions of Essendon (Number 19); Indigenous Team of the Century; Australian Football Hall of Fame, inducted 2010; South Australian Football Hall of Fame, inducted 2012

Gavin Adrian Wanganeen (born 18 June 1973) is a former Australian rules footballer and, after retirement, artist. He played for the Essendon Football Club and Port Adelaide Football Club in the Australian Football League (AFL), and also for the Port Adelaide Magpies in the South Australian National Football League (SANFL). A Brownlow Medal winner and Australian Football Hall of Fame inductee, Wanganeen was appointed Port Adelaide's inaugural captain upon entry into the AFL in 1997 and is the first Indigenous Australian footballer to win the Brownlow Medal and reach the 300-game milestone at senior VFL/AFL level.

Since retirement, Wanganeen has taken up painting, exploring his Kokatha identity in his artwork. He was an ambassador for the Adelaide Fringe in 2019.

== Early life and education ==
Gavin Adrian Wanganeen was born on 18 June 1973 in Mount Gambier to a footballing family; his great-grandfather had played for the local team, Koonibba Football Club, at the Koonibba Mission, near Ceduna, on the west coast of South Australia. His family, who are Kokatha people, moved from Mount Gambier to Port Lincoln for a few years. When Wanganeen was five, they moved again to Salisbury, a northern suburb of Adelaide.

Wanganeen played junior football for Adelaide-based South Australian Amateur Football League club Salisbury North, and attended Salisbury East High School. At the age of 14, Wanganeen joined the Port Adelaide Under-17s side in the SANFL.

== Football career ==
=== Port Adelaide: 1990 ===
Wanganeen made his senior SANFL debut with Port Adelaide in 1990 at only 16 years of age, one of the youngest ever drafted. The 1990 SANFL season was the last year that the competition was the highest level of football in South Australia. He played 24 matches and kicked 46 goals, winning the SANFL Rookie of the Year award, starring in Port Adelaide's 1990 SANFL Grand Final win kicking two goals.

=== Essendon: 1991–1996 ===
Wanganeen's potential was identified early by Essendon, and after losing another South Australian star, Craig Bradley, to Carlton, Bombers coach Kevin Sheedy was determined to secure Wanganeen. As he recalled in an interview for The Football Record:

We always knew he was an exciting talent. We had spotted him very early and watched his progress through the Port Adelaide Reserves to the seniors and knew he would make the grade at AFL level. A lot of people told us he would not shift from Adelaide, but I suppose that only made us all the more determined to get him across.

After doing a deal with Melbourne, Essendon secured Wanganeen with Pick number 12 in the 1989 VFL Draft. Wanganeen debuted for the club in 1991, Round 2 in a win against Richmond.

Essendon came from the clouds in 1993 to win their 15th VFL/AFL premiership with a team that became known as the "Baby Bombers". Wanganeen enjoyed a special year individually, with his fearless attacking approach from defence typical of Essendon's play that season. He would end up winning the first of his five All-Australian jumpers, then followed by winning the 1993 Brownlow Medal, polling 18 votes (which included four counts of three votes late in the season) to edge out Carlton's Greg Williams (who would win his second Brownlow the following season), and North Melbourne's Wayne Carey. He was the first Indigenous Australian footballer to win the Brownlow Medal.

At 20 years of age, Wanganeen was the youngest winner of the League's best and fairest award since Fitzroy's Denis Ryan in 1936.

He was also a key player in South Australia's State of Origin Carnival Championship, and Essendon's Premiership win that year. In 2002, Wanganeen was voted the 19th best Essendon player of all time in the "Champions of Essendon" list.

=== Port Adelaide return: 1997–2006 ===
Wanganeen returned to Port Adelaide in 1997 as the club's 59th captain and its inaugural captain in the AFL. He received 11 Brownlow votes for the year, but after his first season injuries conspired to minimise his impact. He relinquished the Port Adelaide captaincy at the end of the 2000 AFL season which saw a return to his best form. In 2003 Wanganeen was favourite to once again win the Brownlow (he finished equal second). In 2004 Wanganeen won his second premiership medal in Port's first AFL premiership side. Wanganeen played his 300th AFL game in the 2006 season, but then injured his right knee in an SANFL game for the Port Adelaide Magpies, which led him to retire from football. Wanganeen was the first Aboriginal player to play 300 AFL games.

== Art ==
Wanganeen found a new passion following the closure of his football career and has become an accomplished visual artist, with two solo exhibitions by 2018 and much of his artwork decorating his home in suburban Adelaide.

His second exhibition, Through the Stars, was part of the 2018 South Australian Living Artists Festival in Adelaide.

In April 2025, Wanganeeen partnered with Nordic Design Furniture, with his artwork hanging in their showroom on Magill Road, Stepney.

== Other activities ==
In 2013, Wanganeen was appointed senior coach of Pulteney Grammar School's football team. He also had business interests, involving ownership of three Anytime Fitness centres at Modbury, Port Adelaide, and Essendon.

He served as a voluntary ambassador for the Australian branch of the White Ribbon Campaign, a men's campaign that tackles violence against women, and participated in the 2013 "Cycling for Culture" event to draw attention to the importance of language and culture to Aboriginal well-being, specifically to attract funds to contributing to the further development of the Kaurna language.

In February 2019, Wanganeen was appointed one of three Fringe Ambassadors for the Adelaide Fringe, where he appeared in conversation with Holly Ransom for the Fringe Talk Show.

In 2021, Wanganeen competed on Australian Survivor: Brains V Brawn as part of the Brawn tribe. After his tribe lost the immunity challenge on day 7, Wanganeen got voted out, being the third person voted out and placing 22nd.

In May 2023, it was announced that Wanganeen would be participating in the twentieth series of Dancing with the Stars. He was paired with Megan Wragg.

== Recognition and legacy ==
The Gavin Wanganeen Indigenous Scholarship (GWIS) was established at the University of South Australia in 2005 to support disadvantaged Indigenous students to complete a university degree.

The Gavin Wanganeen Medal, for the Best player under 21, was instituted at PAFC in 2006. In 2014, ahead of the AFL returning to the redeveloped Adelaide Oval, a newly constructed section of the eastern grandstand at the ground was named the Gavin Wanganeen Stand.

== Personal life ==
Wanganeen first married Stephanie Richards, and they share a daughter and a son, Tex, who is also a footballer.

Wanganeen married Pippa Hanson in July 2012 and they have four daughters together.

Wanganeen is the first cousin of AFL players and brothers Aaron and Alwyn Davey, and a third cousin of Rabbit Proof Fence actress Natasha Wanganeen.

== Football statistics ==
Wanganeen's football statistics between 1991 and 2006 are shown in the table below.

Legend
G	Goals	K	Kicks	D	Disposals	T	Tackles
B	Behinds	H	Handballs	M	Marks
#	Played in that season's premiership team

Season	Team	No.	Games	Totals							Averages (per game)						
Season	Team	No.	Games	G	B	K	H	D	M	T	G	B	K	H	D	M	T
1991	Essendon	4	18	12	13	155	89	244	39	38	0.7	0.7	8.6	4.9	13.6	2.2	2.1
1992	Essendon	4	21	11	17	238	121	359	55	73	0.5	0.8	11.3	5.8	17.1	2.6	3.5
1993^{#}	Essendon	4	22	5	3	267	146	413	69	30	0.2	0.1	12.1	6.6	18.8	3.1	1.4
1994	Essendon	4	22	12	9	286	101	387	82	42	0.5	0.4	13.0	4.6	17.6	3.7	1.9
1995	Essendon	4	23	10	10	267	124	391	60	27	0.4	0.4	11.6	5.4	17.0	2.6	1.2
1996	Essendon	4	21	14	8	242	111	353	64	43	0.7	0.4	11.5	5.3	16.8	3.0	2.0
1997	Port Adelaide	1	20	14	6	219	129	348	49	28	0.7	0.3	11.0	6.5	17.4	2.5	1.4
1998	Port Adelaide	1	15	8	9	176	60	236	52	28	0.5	0.6	11.7	4.0	15.7	3.5	1.9
1999	Port Adelaide	1	16	5	4	193	92	285	59	15	0.3	0.3	12.1	5.8	17.8	3.7	0.9
2000	Port Adelaide	1	10	6	5	120	55	175	36	9	0.6	0.5	12.0	5.5	17.5	3.6	0.9
2001	Port Adelaide	4	24	41	22	256	109	365	75	26	1.7	0.9	10.7	4.5	15.2	3.1	1.1
2002	Port Adelaide	4	20	12	7	201	83	284	64	21	0.6	0.4	10.1	4.2	14.2	3.2	1.1
2003	Port Adelaide	4	25	15	18	433	91	524	161	33	0.6	0.7	17.3	3.6	21.0	6.4	1.3
2004^{#}	Port Adelaide	4	19	24	10	193	103	296	86	17	1.3	0.5	10.2	5.4	15.6	4.5	0.9
2005	Port Adelaide	4	23	13	8	227	135	362	75	29	0.6	0.3	9.9	5.9	15.7	3.3	1.3
2006	Port Adelaide	4	1	0	0	0	9	9	1	1	0.0	0.0	0.0	9.0	9.0	1.0	1.0
Career			300	202	149	3473	1558	5031	1027	460	0.7	0.5	11.6	5.2	16.8	3.4	1.5

== Football honours and achievements ==
**Brownlow Medal votes**
Season	Votes
1991	7
1992	11
**1993**	**18**
1994	6
1995	7
1996	4
1997	11
1998	3
1999	11
2000	—
2001	4
2002	2
2003	21
2004	2
2005	2
2006	—
**Total**	**109**
Key:
Green / **Bold** = Won

=== Essendon ===
Team

- AFL Premiership (Essendon): 1993
- McClelland Trophy (Essendon): 1993
- Pre-Season Cup (Essendon): 1993, 1994

Individual

- **Champions of Essendon - No. 19**
- **Essendon F.C. Team of the Century - Back Pocket**

=== Port Adelaide ===
Team

- AFL Premiership (Port Adelaide): 2004
- SANFL Premiership (Port Adelaide): 1990
- McClelland Trophy (Port Adelaide): 2002, 2003, 2004
- Pre-Season Cup (Port Adelaide): 2001, 2002

Individual

- John Cahill Medal (Port Adelaide F.C. Best & Fairest): 2003
- Port Adelaide F.C. Captain: 1997–2000
- Port Adelaide F.C Life Membership Recipient: 2006
- SANFL Rookie of the Year: 1990

=== Other individual awards ===
- Brownlow Medal: 1993
- All-Australian: 1992, 1993, 1995, 2001, 2003
- Michael Tuck Medal: 1993
- **Inside Football - Player of the Year**:2003
- Deadly Awards - Most Outstanding Achievement in AFL: 2004
- **Indigenous Team of the Century** - Half-Back Flank
- AFL Life Membership Recipient: 2004

== See also ==
- Gavin Wanganeen Medal
