= Chris Johnson (footballer, born 1976) =

Australian rules footballer, born 1976

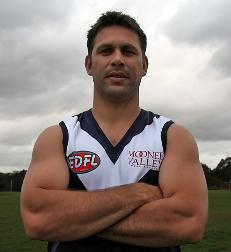
- Johnson in 2010

Personal information
- Full name: Christopher Lloyd Johnson
- Born: 30 May 1976 (age 50)
- Original team: Jacana / Northern U18 (TAC Cup)
- Draft: 7th overall, 1993; Fitzroy
- Height: 180 cm (5 ft 11 in)
- Weight: 92 kg (203 lb)
- Position: Back pocket

Playing career^{1}
Years	Club	Games (Goals)
1994–1996	Fitzroy	59 (67)
1997–2007	Brisbane Lions	205 (105)
Total		264 (172)

Coaching career^{3}
Years	Club	Games (W–L–D)
2009	Indigenous All-Stars	(1–0–0)
- ^{1} Playing statistics correct to the end of 2007.^{3} Coaching statistics correct as of 2009.

Career highlights
- 3× Brisbane Lions Premiership player: 2001, 2002, 2003; 2× All-Australian team: 2002, 2004; Brisbane Lions Co-Captain: 2007; Indigenous Team of the Century; International Rules Series: 2002, 2003, 2005 (Co-Captain); AFL Rising Star nominee: 1994

Christopher Lloyd Johnson (born 30 May 1976) is a former professional Australian rules footballer.

His career highlights as an Australian Football League (AFL) player include three premierships with Brisbane, All-Australian selection, captain of the Australian International Rules team and inclusion in the Indigenous Team of the Century.

Johnson was one of eight players to transfer to Brisbane when Fitzroy's AFL operations were taken over by the Brisbane Bears to form the Brisbane Lions and became the last Fitzroy Lion to play in the AFL.

After retiring from playing professionally, Johnson started coaching and played and coached Essendon District Football League team Avondale Heights Football Club between 2010 and 2012.

His son Lachlan Johnson was drafted to the Essendon Football Club in the 2019 rookie draft.

He now plays for his junior club, Jacana.

== Early life ==
Johnson grew up in Jacana, a northern suburb of Melbourne. He played for the Northern Under 18 side in the TAC Cup, including their 1993 Grand Final winning team, when he kicked 7 goals.

== AFL career ==
Johnson began his professional AFL career with Fitzroy in 1994. He was awarded a nomination in the 1994 AFL Rising Star award in round 21.

He was one of eight players allowed to transfer to Brisbane when Fitzroy's AFL operations were taken over by the Brisbane Bears to form the Brisbane Lions. His career highlights include three premierships with Brisbane, All-Australian selection and inclusion in the Indigenous Team of the Century.

Johnson is renowned for his creative play and composure running out of defence. Nevertheless, his 2007 preseason saw him playing as regularly in the forward line and the midfield as a defender, signalling the club's intention to use him as an impact player.

Johnson was appointed co-captain of the Lions in 2007, alongside Simon Black, Luke Power, Jonathan Brown, and Nigel Lappin.

On 31 August 2007, Johnson announced that he would retire from football at the end of the season. He was the last former Fitzroy Lion still playing in the AFL.

== International rules series 2005 ==
In the 2005 International Rules series, Johnson was named co-captain along with Andrew McLeod. In the second game of the series, Johnson started a brawl by clothes line tackling (or "coat hanger") Philip Jordan and striking Mattie Forde. He was suspended for five matches after pleading guilty to striking, ruling him out until the second Test in 2008.

== Coaching career ==
Following his AFL career, he remained involved in the game.

He became a runner for the Brisbane Lions, appearing in Round 11 against Fremantle Dockers.

Then he shifted into coaching. On Friday 14 September 2007, Johnson signed on with the club as a full-time development coach for the Brisbane Lions. His job is to continue to assist in the development of the club's young playing list in the new position and to show off field leadership. He was promoted to assistant coach to Michael Voss.

He coached Brisbane school and AFL powerhouse St Peters Lutheran College for two years, posting a 10–0 record over his two-year tenure as the head coach for the opens team. They captured the 2007 and 2008 AIC AFL Premiership after defeating Iona College in the Grand Final on both occasions, before the competition was abandoned due to an increase of in game fights. In 2008, the school defeated Cairns school Djarragun College at the Gabba, before the Lions-Saints game, in an exhibition match to promote the AFL's indigenous round.

In February 2009, Johnson coached the Indigenous All-Stars to victory against Adelaide in Darwin.

In 2011 he was appointed the Australian Institute of Sport/AFL Level One Academy Coach.

== Statistics ==
Legend
G	Goals	K	Kicks	D	Disposals	T	Tackles
B	Behinds	H	Handballs	M	Marks

Season	Team	No.	Games	Totals							Averages (per game)						
Season	Team	No.	Games	G	B	K	H	D	M	T	G	B	K	H	D	M	T
1994	Fitzroy	2	17	23	19	132	71	203	49	34	1.4	1.1	7.8	4.2	11.9	2.9	2.0
1995	Fitzroy	2	20	25	18	142	79	221	57	42	1.3	0.9	7.1	4.0	11.1	2.9	2.1
1996	Fitzroy	2	22	19	15	213	176	389	76	85	0.9	0.7	9.7	8.0	17.7	3.5	3.9
1997	Brisbane Lions	2	19	11	12	160	65	225	56	33	0.6	0.6	8.4	3.4	11.8	2.9	1.7
1998	Brisbane Lions	2	14	20	14	87	46	133	42	16	1.4	1.0	6.2	3.3	9.5	3.0	1.1
1999	Brisbane Lions	2	20	25	14	121	52	173	55	24	1.3	0.7	6.1	2.6	8.7	2.8	1.2
2000	Brisbane Lions	2	21	6	4	159	121	280	84	24	0.3	0.2	7.6	5.8	13.3	4.0	1.1
2001	Brisbane Lions	2	21	4	9	234	137	371	105	34	0.2	0.4	11.1	6.5	17.7	5.0	1.6
2002	Brisbane Lions	2	22	7	3	203	114	317	103	47	0.3	0.1	9.2	5.2	14.4	4.7	2.1
2003	Brisbane Lions	2	21	9	2	185	126	311	91	44	0.4	0.1	8.8	6.0	14.8	4.3	2.1
2004	Brisbane Lions	2	25	3	4	221	164	385	117	51	0.1	0.2	8.8	6.6	15.4	4.7	2.0
2005	Brisbane Lions	2	22	6	5	243	123	366	122	48	0.3	0.2	11.0	5.6	16.6	5.5	2.2
2006	Brisbane Lions	2	8	3	1	77	38	115	34	19	0.4	0.1	9.6	4.8	14.4	4.3	2.4
2007	Brisbane Lions	2	12	11	6	91	47	138	62	25	0.9	0.5	7.6	3.9	11.5	5.2	2.1
Career			264	172	126	2268	1359	3627	1053	526	0.7	0.5	8.6	5.1	13.7	4.0	2.0
