= Joe Johnson (Australian footballer) =

Australian rules footballer (1883–1934)

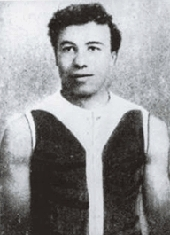
- Johnson, c. 1905

Personal information
- Full name: Joseph Andrew Johnson
- Born: 19 January 1883; Newcastle, New South Wales
- Died: 23 April 1934 (aged 51); Carlton, Victoria
- Original team: Northcote (VFA)
- Debut: 1904, Fitzroy vs. Carlton, at Princes Park
- Height: 168 cm (5 ft 6 in)
- Weight: 77 kg (170 lb)

Playing career^{1}
Years	Club	Games (Goals)
1904–1906	Fitzroy (VFL)	55 (15)
1907–1911	Brunswick (VFA)	
1912–1914	Northcote (VFA)	
- ^{1} Playing statistics correct to the end of 1906.

Career highlights
- 2× VFL premiership player: 1904, 1905

Joseph Andrew Johnson (19 January 1883 – 23 April 1934) was an Australian rules footballer who played for the Fitzroy Football Club in the Victorian Football League (VFL). He is recognised as the first ever Indigenous Australian to play in the VFL.

== Early life ==
Joseph Andrew Johnson was born near Newcastle, New South Wales on 19 January 1883, the son of Melbourne-born Andrew Johnson (1840–1891) and Eliza Catherine Louisa Johnson (1843–1909) (née Gordon).

== Football career ==
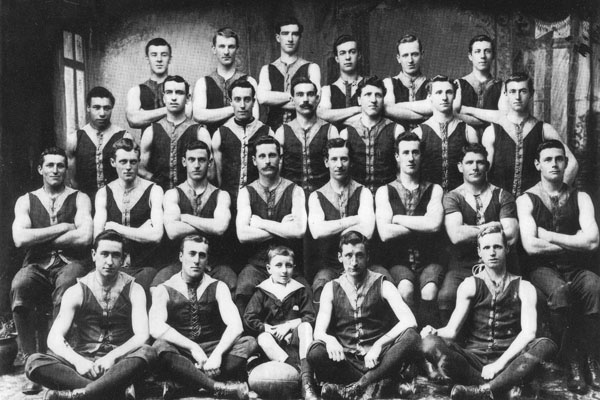
Fitzroy's 1904 Premiership Team: Johnson, left, second row from back

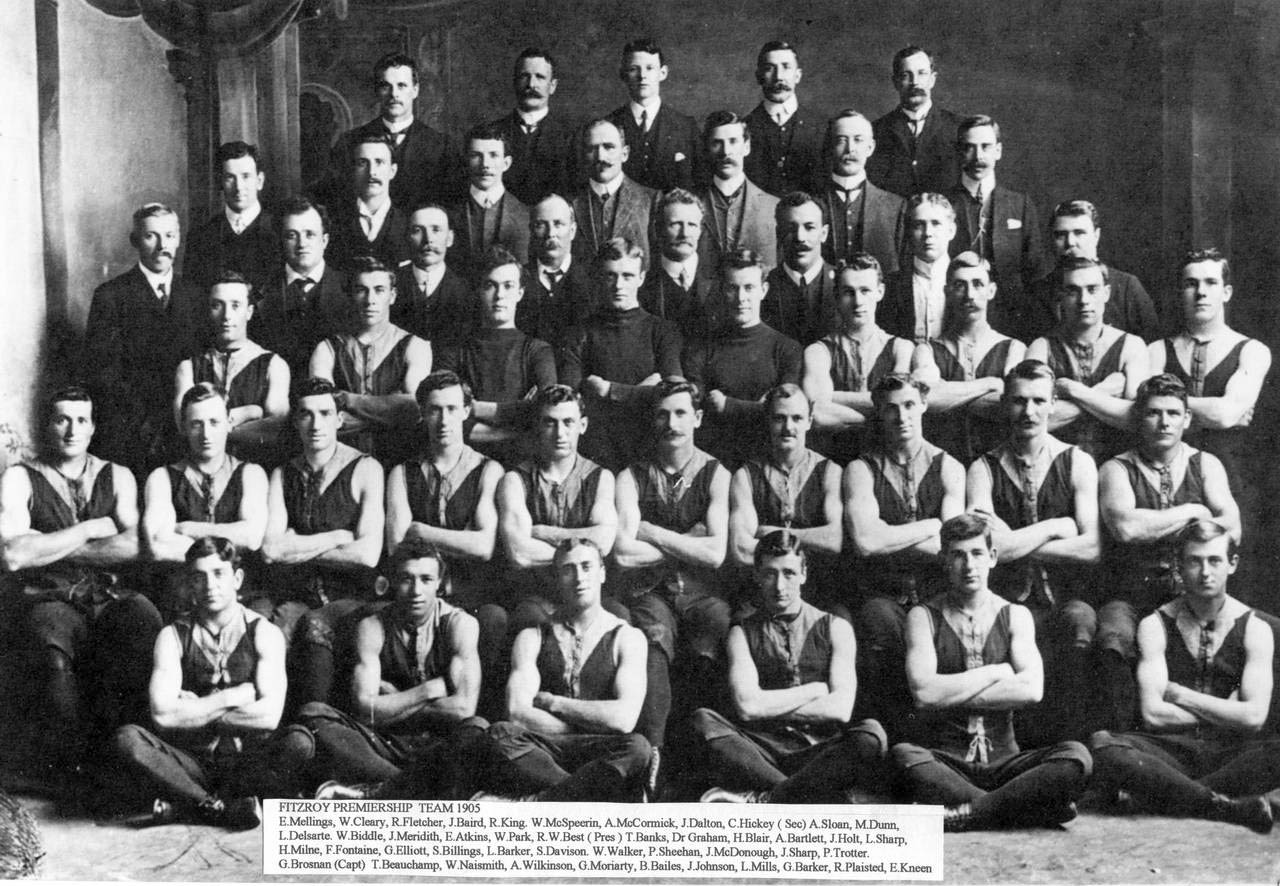
Fitzroy's 1905 Premiership Team: Johnson, second from left, front row

=== Fitzroy ===
Johnson was recruited from Victorian Football Association (VFA) side Northcote and made his senior debut for Fitzroy against Carlton in the opening round of the 1904 VFL season. Initially playing as a half-back flanker, Johnson played in back-to-back premiership teams in 1904 and 1905.

=== Brunswick ===
In 1907, Johnson left Fitzroy for VFA side Brunswick as playing coach, playing in their inaugural premiership in 1909.

=== Northcote ===
In 1912, Johnson returned to Northcote as playing coach until 1914.

== Military service ==
Johnson enlisted in the First Australian Imperial Force (AIF) on 10 February 1916. He was court-martialled in Egypt on 1 August 1916, charged with "striking his superior officer", found guilty, and sentenced to "six calendar months imprisonment with hard labor [sic]" — his incarceration, which commenced on 16 August 1916, was suspended on 15 September 1916.

Johnson then served with the AIF in France from November 1916, was transferred to the United Kingdom for treatment for "acute nephritis" in February 1917, was repatriated to Australia in July 1917, and was discharged from the AIF on 18 October 1917 on medical grounds.

== Personal life ==
Johnson married Nora Campion Naismith (1890–1954) in North Carlton on 3 August 1912.

Johnson's son Percy Johnson, grandson Percy Cummings, and great-grandsons Robert and Trent Cummings also played VFL/AFL football.

== Death ==
Johnson died suddenly on 23 April 1934, and his funeral was held the next day in Carlton.

== Legacy ==
Johnson has been lauded for his role in being the first known Aboriginal footballer in Victoria, "leading the way" for other Aboriginal players to star in football.
