= Percy Cummings =

Australian rules footballer

Personal information
- Full name: Percy Cummings
- Born: 5 September 1946 (age 80)
- Original team: Vermont
- Height: 178 cm (5 ft 10 in)
- Weight: 73 kg (161 lb)

Playing career^{1}
Years	Club	Games (Goals)
1964–1965	Hawthorn	5 (1)
- ^{1} Playing statistics correct to the end of 1965.

Percy Cummings (born 5 September 1946) is a former Australian rules football player who played five games for Hawthorn Football Club.

Cummings is the grandson of Joe Johnson, the first recognised Indigenous Australian to play in the VFL/AFL.
