= Indigenous All-Stars (Australian rules football) =

Names
- Full name: Indigenous All-Stars
- Nickname: All Stars

Club details
- Founded: 1973
- Colours: Black Red Gold

Other information

The Indigenous All-Stars (formerly known as the Aboriginal All-Stars) is an Australian rules football representative team composed of players that identify as Indigenous Australian or with an indigenous culture.

The team has played sporadically in select years, usually against other representative teams or clubs from the Australian Football League (AFL) in the post or pre-season period. The team has also represented Australia on one occasion (in 2013) in the International Rules Series. Junior under-18 and under-16 teams, known as the Flying Boomerangs, have also been part of the All-Stars programme.

Matches featuring the Indigenous All-Stars have been played throughout the country, though originally when the team began playing biannual fixtures the team was based primarily in Darwin. The AFL promotes the concept as recognition of the Indigenous Australians' contribution to the national competition, with approximately one in ten AFL players identifying as an Indigenous Australian.

The best on ground for the Indigenous All-Stars is awarded the Polly Farmer Medal which is in honour of Graham Farmer.

== History ==
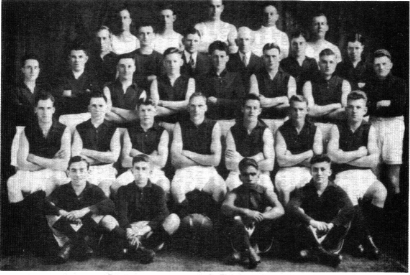
Northcote Football Club's 1929 premiership side. Doug Nicholls is second from right, front row. Nicholls was instrumental in progressing the concept of an All-Aboriginal representative side

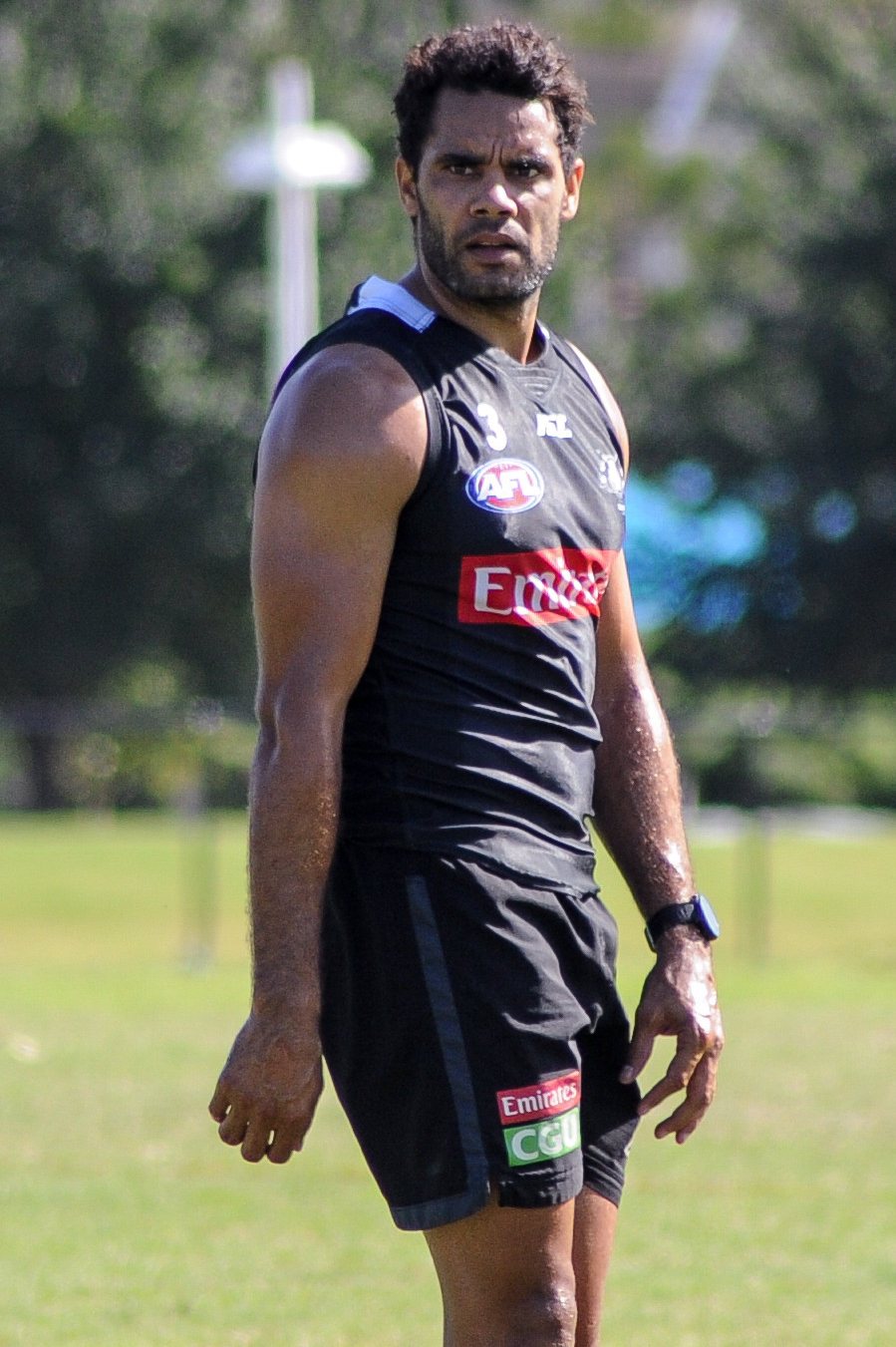
2005 Polly Farmer medallist Daniel Wells.

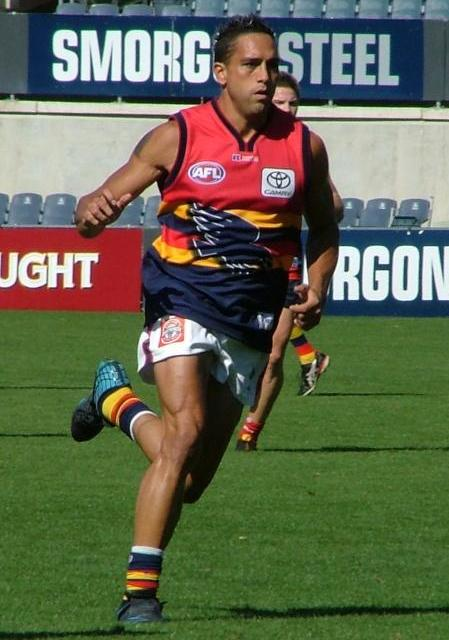
2003, 2007 and 2009 captain Andrew McLeod.

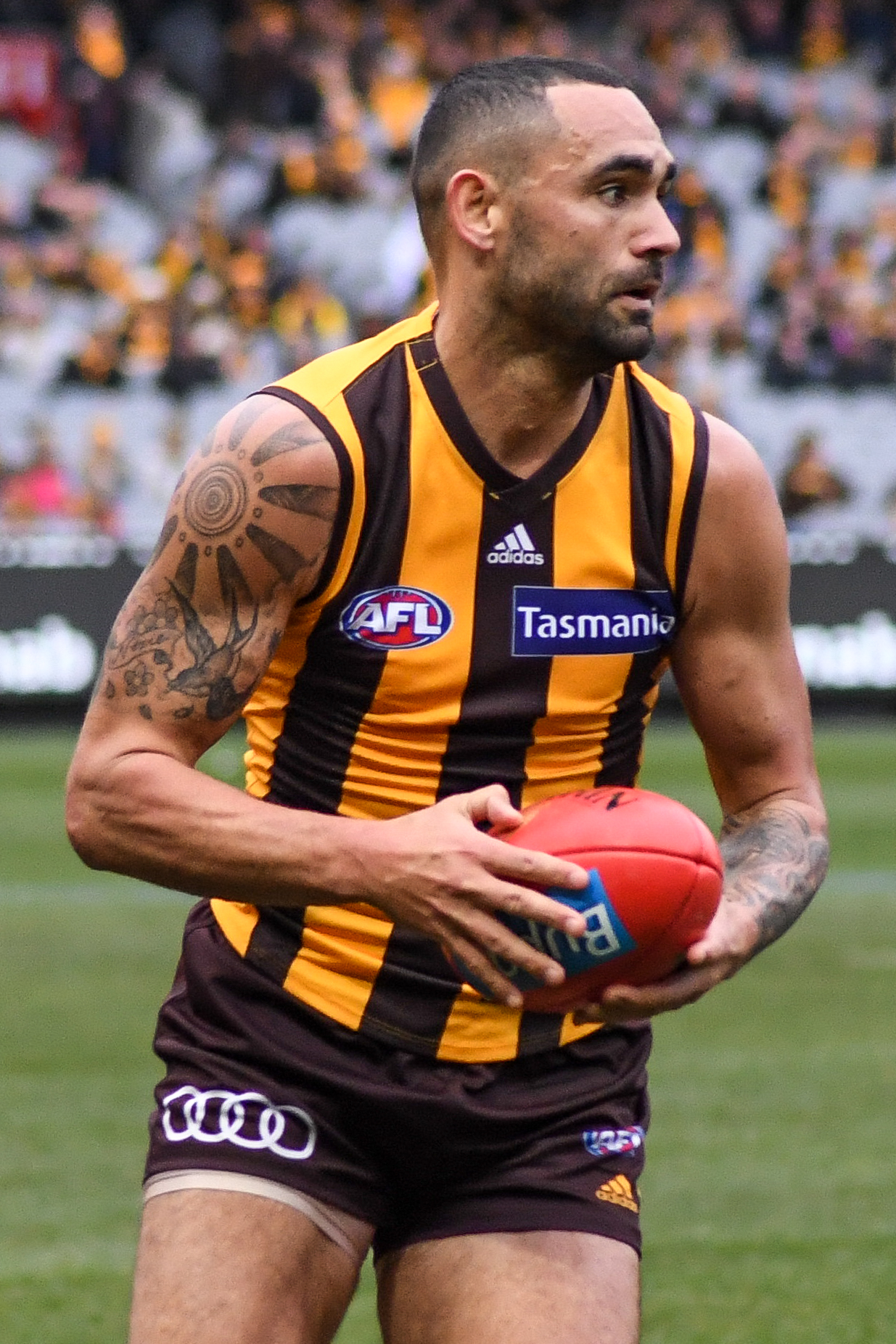
2015 captain Shaun Burgoyne.

All-Indigenous sides have been documented as early the turn of the 20th Century, and the first representative teams began playing matches after World War II.

Following his career in the VFA, Doug Nicholls was instrumental in the concept of an All-Aboriginal representative side. He organised (assembling players mainly from Taree in New South Wales), captained and coached an All-Aboriginal side against the VFA's Northcote Football Club in 1944. Among the aboriginal players was James Murray, Australian Kangaroos rugby league representative. The match drew more than 10,000 spectators.

Nicholls team's matches against the Northcote Football Club became an annual event becoming a regular fixture in 1945 and 1946. The match led to a number of similar contests springing up around the country. It played a charity match against VFA club Oakleigh Football Club attracting 2,000 spectators.

One of the first major representative matches was a side's defeat the Australian Capital Territory, one of the strongest sides in the country, at Manuka Oval in Canberra in 1970.

In 1973, a team was assembled from the best Indigenous Australians across all states and territories to tour Papua New Guinea and play against the Papua New Guinea team. It was originally also scheduled to play against Nauru's national team. Sir Douglas Nicholls accompanied the side. The Australian side lost narrowly and a return match in Australia was scheduled for an Aboriginal Australian Rules carnival to be hosted by the Australian Capital Territory Papua New Guinea narrowly defeated the Indigenous Australian side at Ainslie Oval.

=== All-Stars take on the VFL ===
In 1983, the "All-Stars" competed in a once-off post-season exhibition match in Mildura; two games were played in 1985, while another one-off game was played in 1994.

A match between the All-Stars and The Swans was proposed for Canberra in 1984, to be organised by the National Football League, but did not go ahead.

=== All-Stars take on National competition ===
In 1993, a bi-annual All-Stars vs Collingwood match was proposed.

In 1994, disputes over player releases put the concept into doubt. The St Kilda Football Club refused to release Nicky Winmar, while the West Coast Eagles refused to release Chris Lewis to play.

As of 2015, the All-Stars have won six of the ten matches it has played. The record attendance for the match was 17,500, in the 2003 match against Carlton at Marrara Oval.

=== Hiatus and return in 2025 ===
There was a ten year gap to the next Indigenous All-Stars match. Postponing the proposed 2017 match, the AFL Players' Association's Indigenous members, which managed the team, decided that the match should be scheduled for every four years instead of two.

No full Indigenous All-Stars match was played in 2019. The 2019 AFLX tournament in the 2019 pre-season featured an all-Indigenous AFLX 8-player team named "Deadly", captained by Eddie Betts. This team won one of its three matches. However, the experimental AFLX format was not popular and has not been repeated since.

At a summit in 2022, a 2023 match was proposed between the Indigenous All-Stars and a newly formed Multicultural All-Stars team to draw from players of a variety of diverse cultures, though this never occurred.

The AFL scheduled an Indigenous All-Stars match for a pre-season fixture against Fremantle at Optus Stadium in February 2025. The match was heavily promoted by the league and most of the league's best Indigenous players were named in the side. The Indigenous All-Stars defeated Fremantle by 43 points with a crowd of nearly 38,000 in attendance. The success of the event led to the AFL CEO, Andrew Dillon, stating the league would look to more regularly schedule All-Stars contests, possibly within a State of Origin context.

== Sponsorship and naming rights ==
Until 2005, the All-Stars were sponsored by the Aboriginal and Torres Strait Islander Commission, who had naming rights over the team. After the abolition of ATSIC, the team was renamed from Aboriginal All-Stars to Indigenous All-Stars. Since 2006, the team has been sponsored by Qantas through the AFL Kickstart indigenous program.

== Results ==
Matches
Year	Date	Opponent	Result	Stadium	Captain (vice-captain)	Coach	Best (Polly Farmer Medal)	Crowd
1973	3 October	Lae, Papua New Guinea	Lae 9.12 (66) def All-Stars 9.8 (62)	Lae, Papua New Guinea	Ray Rigney		Dennis Archee	
1973	7 October	Papua New Guinea	Papua New Guinea 17.19 (121) def All-Stars 12.18 (90)	Sir Hubert Murray Stadium, Port Moresby	Ray Rigney		Leo Wanganeen	6,000
1974	6 October	Papua New Guinea	All-Stars 12.10 (82) def. by Papua New Guinea 13.11 (89)	Ainslie Oval, Canberra	Ray Rigney		Ralph White	
1983	1 October	Richmond Football Club/Mildura	All-Stars 37.11 (233) def Richmond 14.11 (95)	Sarah Oval, Mildura	Stephen Michael	Michael Wanganeen	Rex Handy	3,500
1985	16 February	Essendon	Essendon 13.20 (98) def All-Stars 11.16 (82)	Tatura, Victoria	Stephen Michael	Wilbur Wilson	—N/a	6,000
1985	13 September	Premier's All Stars	Premier's All Stars 23.12 (150) def All-Stars 10.8 (68)	MCG	Maurice Rioli	Syd Jackson	Ian Barry	5,333
1994	12 February	Collingwood Football Club	All-Stars 13.10 (88) def Collingwood 10.8 (68)	Marrara Oval, Darwin	Michael McLean	Maurice Rioli	Fabian Francis	15,000
2003	7 February	Carlton Football Club	All-Stars 19.16 (130) def Carlton 8.9 (57)	Marrara Oval, Darwin	Andrew McLeod	Michael McLean	Adam Goodes	17,500
2005	5 February	Western Bulldogs	All-Stars 12.19 (91) def Western Bulldogs 10.3 (63)	Marrara Oval, Darwin	Darryl White (Chris Johnson)	Michael McLean	Daniel Wells	8,500
2007	11 February	Essendon Football Club	All-Stars 6.7 (43) def by Essendon 14.9 (93)	Marrara Oval, Darwin	Andrew McLeod	Michael McLean	Andrew McLeod	13,119
2009	7 February	Adelaide Crows	All-Stars 14.13 (97) def Adelaide 6.7 (43)	Marrara Oval, Darwin	Andrew McLeod (Shaun Burgoyne)	Chris Johnson	Matt Campbell	9,497
2011	4 February	Richmond Football Club	Match cancelled due to inclement weather	—N/a	Adam Goodes	Michael O'Loughlin	—N/a	—N/a
2013	8 February	Richmond Football Club	All-Stars 14.6 (90) def Richmond 6.4 (40)	Traeger Park, Alice Springs	Nathan Lovett-Murray	Michael O'Loughlin	Harley Bennell	8,350
2015	20 February	West Coast Eagles	West Coast 7.7 (49) def All-Stars 5.11 (41)	Leederville Oval, Perth	Shaun Burgoyne (Jarrod Harbrow)	Andy Lovell	Shaun Burgoyne	10,000
2025	15 February	Fremantle Football Club	All-Stars 16.12 (108) def Fremantle 9.11 (65)	Perth Stadium, Perth	Michael Walters	Xavier Clarke	Jy Simpkin	37,865

== Squads ==
=== 1973 team ===
Roger Rigney (SA); Michael Mansell (Tas); Anthony Miller (WA); Brian Warrior (SA); Dennis Lewfat (NT); Patrick Purantatameri (NT); Reg Mathews (QLD); Bill Ellis (NT); John McHenry (WA); Leon Wanganeen (SA); Alec Smith (Vic); John Pepperill (NT); Phillip Archer (SA); Ian Charles (VIC); Robbie Muir (VIC); Ken Liddle (NT); Wilfred Wilson (SA); Tim Agius (SA); Garry Murray (VIC); Paul Hansen (WA); Lloyd Bray (NT)

== International Rules ==
In 2013, the Indigenous All-Stars team competed under the Australia banner against Ireland in the International Rules Series, a hybrid sport which consists elements of Gaelic football and Australian rules football. For the 2013 Series a 33-man squad was chosen, which was reduced to 21-man touring party.

The Indigenous team lost the series 2–0 and by an aggregate score of 173–72, a record-high margin for the International Rules series.

== Polly Farmer Medal ==
The Polly Farmer Medal is awarded each game to the best Indigenous All-Stars player.

== See also ==
- Flying Boomerangs
- Rugby league Indigenous All-Stars
