= Percy Johnson (footballer, born 1930) =

Australian rules footballer (1930–2014)

Personal information
- Full name: Percival Clyde Johnson
- Born: 8 October 1930
- Died: 27 December 2014 (aged 84)
- Debut: 1951, North Melbourne
- Height: 173 cm (5 ft 8 in)
- Weight: 73 kg (161 lb)

Playing career^{1}
Years	Club	Games (Goals)
1951–55	North Melbourne	52 (4)
- ^{1} Playing statistics correct to the end of 1955.

Percival Clyde Johnson (8 October 1930 – 27 December 2014) was an Australian rules footballer who played with North Melbourne in the Victorian Football League (VFL) during the 1950s.

A wingman or rover, Johnson was known for his pace and aggression.

In 1956 he commenced training with Fitzroy but did not play a senior VFL game for them.
