= Adrian McAdam =

Australian rules footballer

Personal information
- Born: 12 March 1971 (age 55); Alice Springs, Northern Territory
- Debut: North Melbourne vs. Richmond, at MCG
- Height: 183 cm (6 ft 0 in)
- Weight: 82 kg (181 lb)

Playing career^{1}
Years	Club	Games (Goals)
1988-1991	North Adelaide	15 (21)
1993–1995	North Melbourne	36 (92)
- ^{1} Playing statistics correct to the end of 1995.

Adrian McAdam (born 12 March 1971) is a former Australian rules footballer who played with North Melbourne in the Australian Football League (AFL) and North Adelaide in the SANFL during the early 1990s.

An Indigenous Australian, McAdam played in the Northern Territory Football League prior to being recruited by North Melbourne. Like his older brother Gilbert, he played with Southern Districts. During this time McAdam also captained the Northern Territory in the Teal Cup.

In 1993, he joined John Longmire and Wayne Carey in the North Melbourne forward line and kicked 7 goals on his debut. His goal tally was the most ever by a North Melbourne player on debut and he followed it up with 10 goals against Sydney the following week and then 6 goals against Footscray. This gave him a total of 23 goals from his first three games in the AFL (which is still a record) and he finished the year with 68 goals from his 17 games. He was unable to repeat this performance in 1994 and, after managing just one game in 1995, his league career was effectively over.

He joined Collingwood for the 1996 season, but was delisted before he could add to his 36 AFL games.

McAdam then began to concentrate on cricket and in 2003 represented the Northern Territory Chief Minister's XI, captained by Michael Clarke, in a three-day match against the touring Bangladeshis. McAdam, who was a fast bowler, claimed the wickets of Habibul Bashar, Mohammad Ashraful and Javed Omar.
