= Gilbert McAdam =

Australian rules footballer (born 1967)

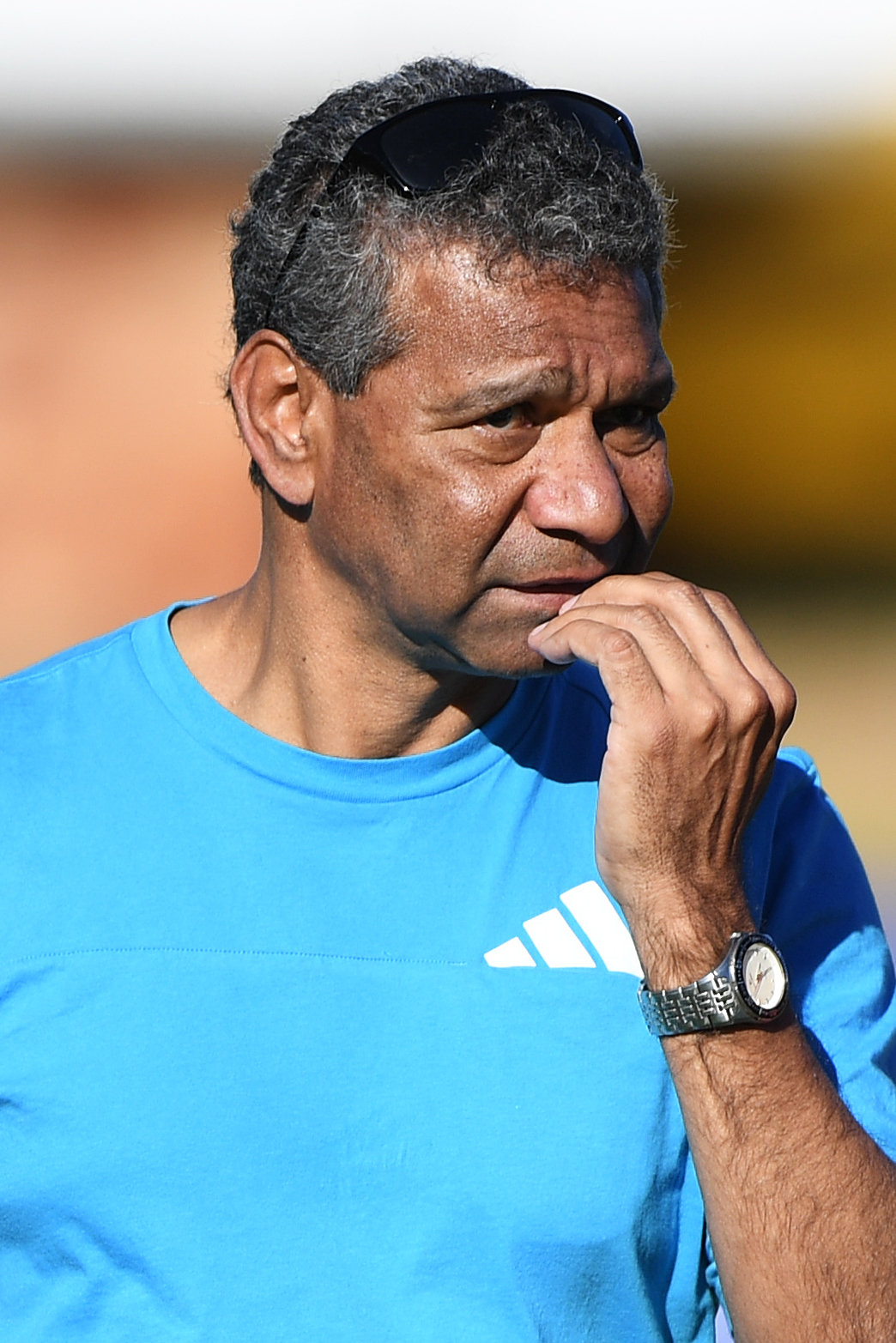
- McAdam in July 2019

Personal information
- Born: 30 March 1967 (age 59); Alice Springs, Northern Territory
- Original team: Southern Districts
- Height: 182 cm (6 ft 0 in)
- Weight: 76 kg (168 lb)
1986	Claremont (WAFL)	3 (5)
1988-1990, 1998	Central District (SANFL)	86 (92)
1991–1993	St Kilda (AFL)	53 (48)
1994–1996	Brisbane Bears (AFL)	58 (41)
Total		200 (186)

Representative team honours
Years	Team	Games (Goals)
	South Australia	? (?)

Gilbert McAdam (born 30 March 1967) is an Indigenous Australian former Australian rules football player and one of three McAdam brothers to play in the Australian Football League (AFL).

== Playing career ==
=== Early career ===
McAdam grew up in Alice Springs, where his father was president of the South Alice Football Club. McAdam is of Arrernte heritage through his mother, and Gija heritage through his father. His older brother, Greg McAdam, had earlier found his way to the St Kilda Football Club via North Adelaide in the SANFL. McAdam moved to Darwin to play in the Northern Territory Football League (NTFL) with the Southern Districts Football Club when he was just 11 years old. In 1979, Gilbert McAdam was chosen as the 12-year-old schoolboys Northern Territory captain who captained the team to victory to become the first Northern Territory team to win a national title. The stand out players were McAdams and Scott Parker who was the youngest competitor to have played in the carnival.

In 1986, McAdam played 3 games for Claremont in the West Australian Football League (WAFL) before returning home to Darwin. After a few seasons he went on to play in the South Australian National Football League (SANFL) with Central District Football Club, taking out the 1989 Magarey Medal. McAdam was the first Indigenous player to take out the award.

=== AFL career ===
McAdam was drafted number 17 in the 1989 VFL Draft by St Kilda Football Club. He kicked five goals in the famous 1993 game against Collingwood at Victoria Park, after he and Nicky Winmar were racially vilified by Magpies fans while warming up. which continued and worsened throughout the game as Saints pulled ahead to win In April 2023, the weekend before the 30th anniversary of the game, the Collingwood Football Club formally apologised to Winmar and McAdam for the incident.

After three years and 53 games for the Saints, McAdam headed north to play for the Brisbane Bears. He played 58 games between 1994 and 1996 and kicked 41 goals before returning to the Central District Football Club for the 1998 SANFL season. McAdam retired from football in 1999.

== Coaching career ==
McAdam returned to Alice Springs and coached South Alice to a premiership. In 2006, he moved back to Darwin to coach the Darwin Football Club.

== Post-football career ==
In 2007, McAdam took up a position with the Academy of Sport, Health and Education in Shepparton, Victoria. The academy uses participation in sport as an avenue for Indigenous people to undertake education and training within a trusted and culturally appropriate environment. His role with the academy is as a sports and personal development officer. He co-hosts the TV program The Marngrook Footy Show with Grant Hansen, currently screening on NITV on Thursday nights. He also hosts the TV program "Kickin' Back with Gilbert McAdam" on NITV.
