= List of players drafted to the Australian Football League under the father–son rule =

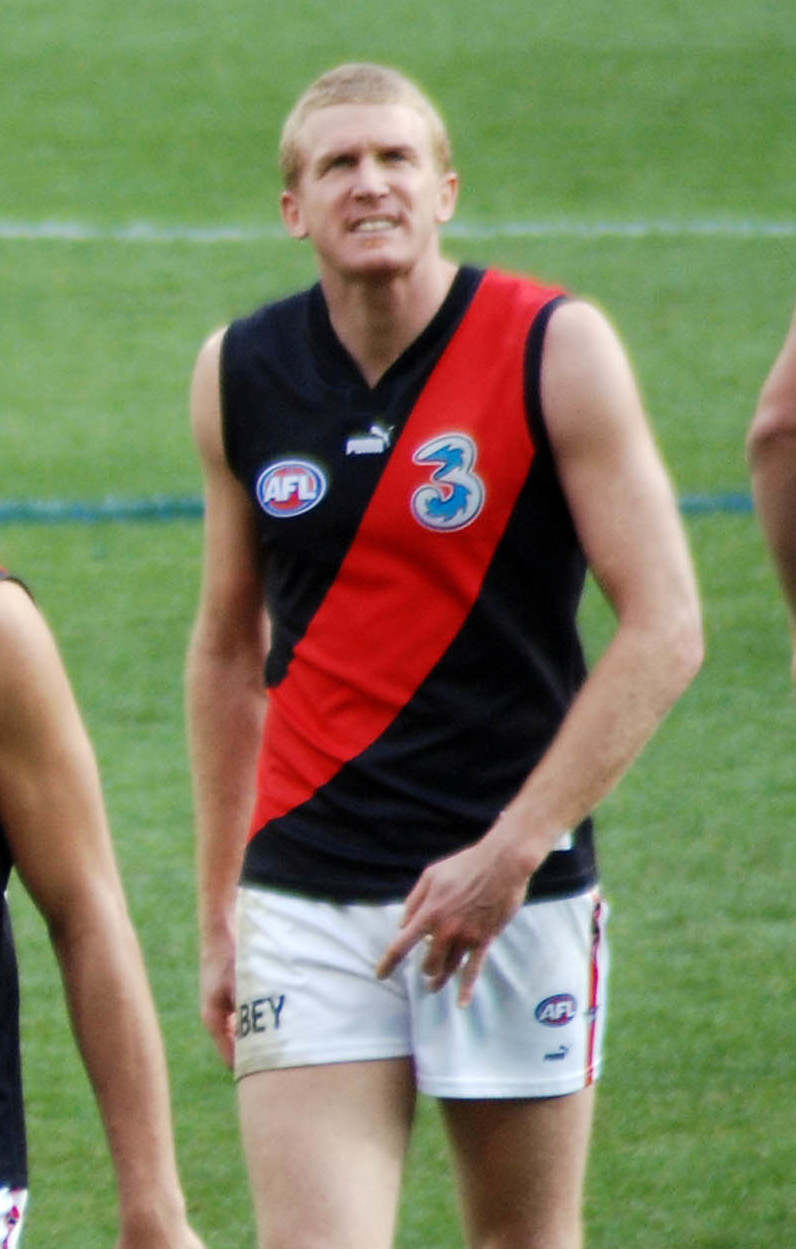
Dustin Fletcher, the son of Ken Fletcher has played the most games of any father–son selection, with 400 AFL matches played

The father–son rule is a rule used for recruiting in the Australian Football League, along with an equivalent father–daughter rule in its women's competition, AFL Women's: both allow clubs first recruiting access to the son or daughter of a long-serving member of that club.

The father–son rule has existed since 1949, while the father–daughter rule has existed since the AFLW's formation in 2017.

Criteria are also in place for equivalent mother–son and mother–daughter rules, from such time as the children of AFLW players reach draft eligible age (i.e. at least 18 years of age on 31 December in the year in which they are drafted).

The following is a complete list of father–son draftees since 1986, when an entry draft was first established in the league, and also a complete list of father–daughter draftees since the AFLW's formation in 2017.

== AFL ==
^	Denotes current player
*	Denotes current player, changed team

Year	Drafted player	Club	Father	Selection	Games played	Father's games played
1988	Sean Bowden	Richmond	Michael Bowden	N/A	6	59
1988	Michael James	Carlton	John James	N/A	12	195
1988	Chris Mulcair	Carlton	Barry Mulcair	N/A	0	20
1988	Heath Shephard	Collingwood	Graeme Shephard	N/A	11	46
1988	Tom Kavanagh	Melbourne	Brent Crosswell	111	2	48
1988	Gareth John	Sydney	Graeme John	106	21	77 (South Melbourne)
1989	Stuart Annand	St Kilda	Bud Annand	105	0	106
1989	Ernie Hug, Jr.	Collingwood	Ernie Hug, Sr.	106	0	59
1989	Ashley McIntosh	West Coast	John McIntosh	112	242	146 (Claremont)
1992	Dustin Fletcher	Essendon	Ken Fletcher	N/A	400	264
1992	Luke Darcy	Footscray	David Darcy	N/A	226	133
1992	Matthew Richardson	Richmond	Alan Richardson	N/A	282	103
1992	Darren Walsh	Carlton	Brian Walsh	N/A	0	64
1992	Glenn Molloy	Melbourne	Graham Molloy	N/A	20	67
1992	Brad Campbell	Melbourne	Des Campbell	N/A	1	50
1992	David Sierakowski	St Kilda	Brian Sierakowski	N/A	93	75
1993	Jarrod Molloy	Fitzroy	Shane Molloy	N/A	59	61
1994	David Bourke	Richmond	Francis Bourke	N/A	85	300
1995	Joel Bowden	Richmond	Michael Bowden	N/A	265	57
1995	Ben Cousins	West Coast	Bryan Cousins	N/A	238	238 (Perth)
1995	Simon Fletcher	Geelong	Garry Fletcher	N/A	0	N/A (Administrator)
1995	Nick Jewell	Richmond	Tony Jewell	N/A	1	80
1995	David Round	Footscray	Barry Round	N/A	2	135
1995	David Walls	Carlton	Robert Walls	N/A	0	215
1996	Lance Whitnall	Carlton	Graeme Whitnall	N/A	216	66
1997	Marc Woolnough	Geelong	Michael Woolnough	29	6	117
1997	Matthew Scarlett	Geelong	John Scarlett	45	284	183
1998	Brad Oborne	Collingwood	Rod Oborne	35	5	87
1998	Heath James	Sydney	Max James	28	18	54 (South Melbourne)
1998	David Clarke	Geelong	David Clarke	21	89	207
1998	Nick Davis	Collingwood	Craig Davis	19	71	102
1999	Jonathan Brown	Brisbane Lions	Brian Brown	30	256	51 (Fitzroy)
1999	Shane Morrison	Brisbane Lions	Peter Morrison	44	5	Unknown (W.G., Mayne)
1999	Rhyce Shaw	Collingwood	Ray Shaw	18	94	146
1999	Stephen Doyle	Sydney	Robert Doyle	26	47	77 (South Melbourne)
2000	Jason Cloke	Collingwood	David Cloke	19	76	114
2000	Steven Greene	Hawthorn	Russell Greene	28	42	184
2001	Gary Ablett, Jr.	Geelong	Gary Ablett, Sr.	40	247	242
2001	Jarrad Waite	Carlton	Vin Waite	46	184	153
2002	Sean Dempster	Sydney	Graham Dempster	34	54	64 (South Melbourne)
2002	Tim Callan	Geelong	Terry Callan	36	15	62
2002	Jobe Watson	Essendon	Tim Watson	40	220	307
2002	Brett Ebert	Port Adelaide	Russell Ebert	42	166	391 (Port Adelaide in SANFL)
2002	Cameron Cloke	Collingwood	David Cloke	43	21	114
2003	Brayden Shaw	Collingwood	Tony Shaw	32	0	313
2003	Chris Johnson	Melbourne	Alan Johnson	36	31	135
2003	Tom Roach	Richmond	Michael Roach	37	11	200
2003	Mark Blake	Geelong	Rod Blake	38	99	176
2003	Brett Peake	Fremantle	Brian Peake	43	75	305 (East Fremantle)
2003	Heath Shaw	Collingwood	Ray Shaw	48	173	146
2004	Travis Cloke	Collingwood	David Cloke	39	246	114
2004	Luke Blackwell	Carlton	Wayne Blackwell	41	23	110
2004	Jesse W. Smith	North Melbourne	Ross W. Smith	42	27	224
2004	Mitch Morton	West Coast	Noel Morton	44	12	171 (Claremont)
2004	Nathan Ablett	Geelong	Gary Ablett, Sr.	48	32	242
2005	Travis Tuck	Hawthorn	Michael Tuck	38	20	426
2005	Jay Neagle	Essendon	Merv Neagle	39	28	147
2006	Josh Kennedy	Hawthorn	John Kennedy Jr.	40	13	241
2006	Tom Hawkins	Geelong	Jack Hawkins	41	359	182
2007	Darcy Daniher	Essendon	Anthony Daniher	39	6	118
2007	Adam Donohue	Geelong	Larry Donohue	60	0	105
2007	Jaxson Barham	Collingwood	Ricky Barham	61	7	151
2008	Ayce Cordy	Western Bulldogs	Brian Cordy	14	27	124
2010	Mitch Wallis	Western Bulldogs	Stephen Wallis	22	162	261
2010	Tom Liberatore	Western Bulldogs	Tony Liberatore	41	257	283
2010	Jacob Brennan	West Coast	Michael Brennan	62	28	179
2011	Tom Mitchell	Sydney	Barry Mitchell	21	65	170
2011	Dylan Buckley	Carlton	Jim Buckley	62	39	164
2011	Jed Bews	Geelong	Andrew Bews	86	175	164
2012	Joe Daniher	Essendon	Anthony Daniher	10	108	118
2012	Jack Viney*	Melbourne	Todd Viney	26	237	233
2012	Lachie Hunter	Western Bulldogs	Mark Hunter	49	173	130
2013	Luke McDonald^	North Melbourne	Donald McDonald	8	218	155
2014	Darcy Moore^	Collingwood	Peter Moore	9	195	172
2014	Billy Stretch	Melbourne	Steven Stretch	42	47	164
2014	Zaine Cordy	Western Bulldogs	Brian Cordy	62	118	124
2014	Alec Waterman	West Coast	Chris Waterman	76	0	177
2014	Josh Clayton	Brisbane Lions	Scott Clayton	86	2	160 (Fitzroy)
2014	Jake Long	Essendon	Michael Long	47 (rookie)	5	190
2015	Bailey Rice	St Kilda	Dean Rice	49	11	116
2015	Jack Silvagni^	Carlton	Stephen Silvagni	53	128	312
2015	Tom Wallis	Essendon	Dean Wallis	54 (rookie)	0	127
2016	Callum Brown	Collingwood	Gavin Brown	35	70	254
2016	Josh Daicos^	Collingwood	Peter Daicos	57	151	250
2016	Jake Waterman^	West Coast	Chris Waterman	77	112	177
2016	Ben Jarman	Adelaide	Darren Jarman	45 (rookie)	0	121
2016	Sam Simpson	Geelong	Sean Simpson	53 (rookie)	25	114
2017	Patrick Naish	Richmond	Chris Naish	34	9	143
2017	Tyler Brown	Collingwood	Gavin Brown	50	27	254
2017	Jackson Edwards	Adelaide	Tyson Edwards	41 (rookie)	0	321
2018	Rhylee West^	Western Bulldogs	Scott West	26	81	324
2018	Will Kelly	Collingwood	Craig Kelly	29	5	122
2018	Bailey Scott	North Melbourne	Robert Scott	49	113	113
2018	Joel Crocker	North Melbourne	Darren Crocker	69	0	165
2018	Ben Silvagni	Carlton	Stephen Silvagni	70	0	312
2018	Oscar Brownless	Geelong	Billy Brownless	74	0	198
2019	Jackson Mead	Port Adelaide	Darren Mead	25	64	122
2019	Finn Maginness*	Hawthorn	Scott Maginness	29	58	131
2019	Trent Burgoyne	Port Adelaide	Peter Burgoyne	22 (rookie)	0	240
2020	Maurice Rioli, Jr.^	Richmond	Maurice Rioli, Snr.	51	49	118
2020	Taj Schofield	Port Adelaide	Jarrad Schofield	37 (rookie)	0	131
2021	Sam Darcy^	Western Bulldogs	Luke Darcy	2	45	226
2021	Nick Daicos^	Collingwood	Peter Daicos	4	95	250
2021	Jackson Archer^	North Melbourne	Glenn Archer	59	26	311
2021	Jase Burgoyne^	Port Adelaide	Peter Burgoyne	60	56	240
2021	Taj Woewodin	Melbourne	Shane Woewodin	65	21	138
2022	Will Ashcroft^	Brisbane Lions	Marcus Ashcroft	2	58	318
2022	Jaspa Fletcher^	Brisbane Lions	Adrian Fletcher	12	65	107
2022	Max Michalanney^	Adelaide	Jim Michalanney	17	66	211 (Norwood)
2022	Alwyn Davey Jr.	Essendon	Alwyn Davey	45	20	100
2022	Jayden Davey	Essendon	Alwyn Davey	54	0	100
2022	Cooper Harvey	North Melbourne	Brent Harvey	56	10	432
2022	Osca Riccardi	Geelong	Peter Riccardi	32 (rookie)	0	288
2023	Jordan Croft^	Western Bulldogs	Matthew Croft	15	0	186
2023	Will McCabe^	Hawthorn	Luke McCabe	19	0	138
2023	Calsher Dear^	Hawthorn	Paul Dear	56	26	123
2023	Kynan Brown	Melbourne	Nathan Brown	22 (rookie)	2	146
2023	Indhi Kirk	Sydney	Brett Kirk	N/A	0	241
2024	Levi Ashcroft^	Brisbane Lions	Marcus Ashcroft	5	27	318
2024	Ben Camporeale	Carlton	Scott Camporeale	43	0	233
2024	Lucas Camporeale	Carlton	Scott Camporeale	54	3	233
2024	Tyler Welsh	Adelaide	Scott Welsh	59	0	129
2024	Jaren Carr^	Fremantle	Matthew Carr	63	0	134
2024	River Stevens^	North Melbourne	Anthony Stevens	67	0	292
2025	Harry Dean^	Carlton	Peter Dean	3	0	248
2025	Will Darcy^	Western Bulldogs	Luke Darcy	60	0	226
2025	Kalani White	Melbourne	Jeff White	N/A	0	236
2026	Cody Walker^	Carlton	Andrew Walker	3	0	202
2026	Aidan McCartney^	North Melbourne	Jason McCartney	54	0	107
2026	Cooper Hodge^	Hawthorn	Luke Hodge	58	0	305
2026	Harper Banfield^	West Coast	Drew Banfield	74	0	265
Sources: 1986–2009, 2010 & 2011
Games Played last updated 12/10/2025
Prior to 1997, father–son selections were taken prior to the draft and hence did not have a selection number. From 1997 to 2006, selections were made in the third round. Since 2007, selections have been subject to a bidding system.

== AFL Women's ==
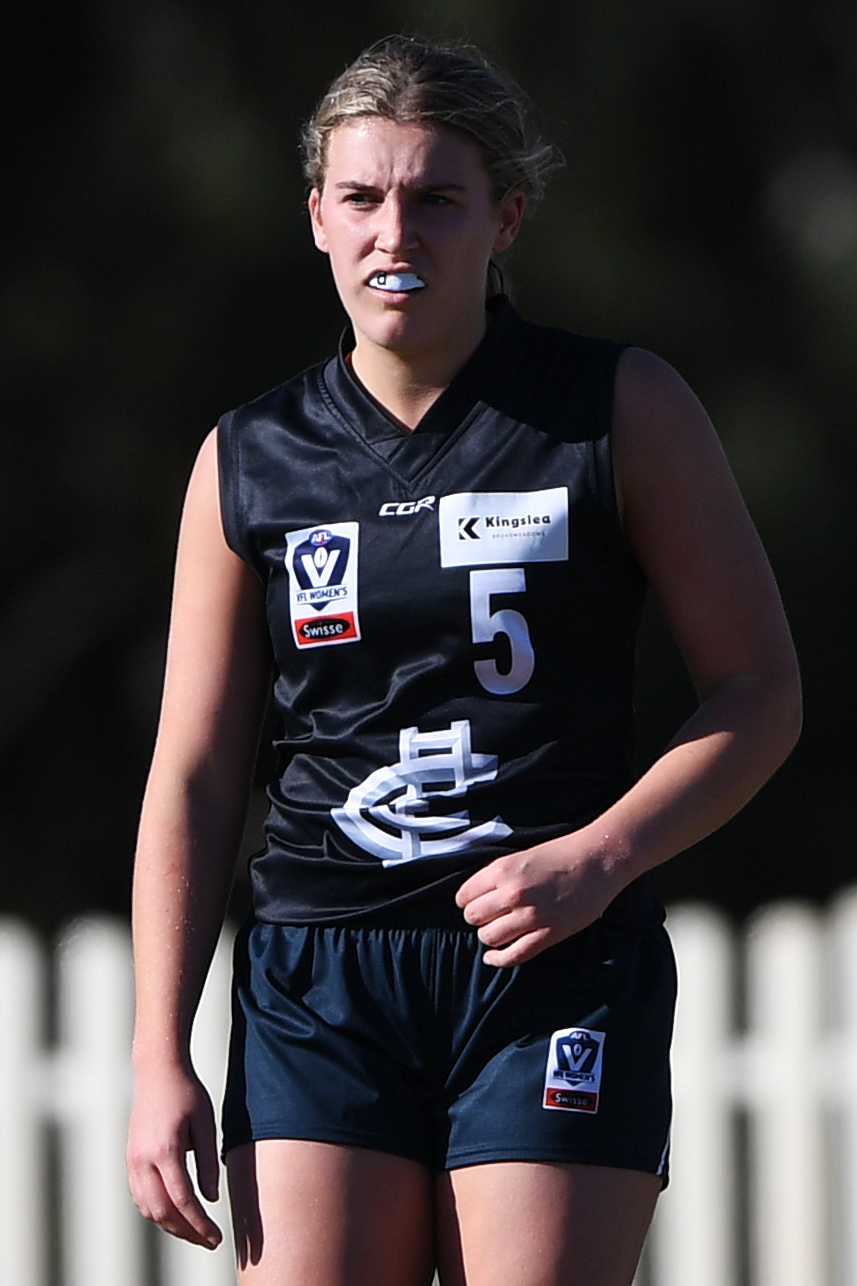
Abbie McKay, the daughter of Andrew McKay, was the first player to be selected under the father–daughter rule

^	Denotes current player
*	Denotes current player, changed team

Year	Drafted player	Club	Father	Selection	Games played	Father's games played
2018	Abbie McKay^	Carlton	Andrew McKay	16	43	244
2019	Millie Brown^	Geelong	Paul Brown	11	14	84
2019	Isabella Grant^	Western Bulldogs	Chris Grant	47	33	341
2020	Tarni Brown*	Collingwood	Gavin Brown	19	34	254
2020	Alice Burke^	St Kilda	Nathan Burke	32	32	323
2020	Amy Smith^	North Melbourne	Shaun Smith	55	31	47 (Note: Smith also played 62 games for Melbourne)
2022	Caitlin Matthews^	St Kilda	Dean Matthews	81	0	1
2023	Bryde O'Rourke^	Geelong	Ray O'Rourke	23	0	2
2023	Jemma Rigoni	Melbourne	Guy Rigoni	29	0	107
2023	Meg Robertson^	Carlton	Ben Robertson	31	0	3
2023	Charlotte Simpson^	St Kilda	Sean Simpson	47	0	7 (Note: Simpson also played 114 games for Geelong)
2024	Sophie McKay^	Carlton	Andrew McKay	17	0	244
2024	Violet Patterson^	Collingwood	Stephen Patterson	42	0	96
2025	Maya Dear^	Hawthorn	Paul Dear	57	0	123
2025	Meg Lappin^	Brisbane Lions	Nigel Lappin	59	0	279
Statistics correct to the end of the 2023 season
Selections are made with the eligible club's next available pick following a bid by another club.
