= The Clokes =

The Clokes refers to a sporting dynasty in the sport of Australian rules football.

== List ==
- David Cloke (born 1955) - former Australian rules footballer
- Jason Cloke (born 1982) - former Australian rules footballer, son of David
- Cameron Cloke (born 1984) - former Australian rules footballer, son of David
- Travis Cloke (born 1987) - Australian rules footballer, son of David
