= 1988 West Coast Eagles season =

West Coast Eagles
1988 season
- President: Richard Colless
- Coach: John Todd
- Captain(s): Ross Glendinning
- Home ground: Subiaco Oval; WACA Ground
- National Panasonic Cup: semi-finals
- VFL season: 5th
- Finals series: N/A
- Best & Fairest: Chris Mainwaring
- Leading goalkicker: Ross Glendinning (73 goals)
- Highest home attendance: 43,438 (elimination final vs Melbourne at Waverley Park)
- Lowest home attendance: 7,157 (round 10 vs Richmond at the MCG)
- Average home attendance: 19,277

The 1988 VFL season was the West Coast Eagles' second season in the Victorian Football League (VFL). John Todd was appointed coach after Ron Alexander was sacked and Ross Glendinning remained captain. The Eagles played 22 games, winning 13 and losing 9 to finish 5th on the ladder.

== List ==
=== Recruitment ===
West Coast recruited 12 players, with 11 from WAFL clubs, for the 1988 season:

- Clinton Browning (East Fremantle)
- Kevin Caton (Swan Districts)
- Joe Cormack (Swan Districts)
- Shane Ellis (East Fremantle)
- Richard Geary (South Fremantle)
- Peter Higgins (Claremont)
- Brent Hutton (Swan Districts)
- Don Langsford (Swan Districts)
- Guy McKenna (Claremont)
- Murray Rance (Footscray)
- Troy Ugle (Swan Districts)
- Chris Waterman (East Fremantle)

== Pre-season ==
=== Panasonic Cup ===
West Coast defeated Sydney by 87 points in front of a crowd of 12,587 at the WACA Ground in the first round of the competition, the first night-series/pre-season match to be played in Western Australia since 1981, before losing to Essendon by 36 points in the second round.

Home team's score listed in bold:

Round	Date	Score	Opponent	Opponent's Score	Result	Venue	Attendance
1	Wednesday, 10 February 2:10pm	**19.14 (128)**	Sydney	5.11 (41)	Won by 87 points	WACA Ground	12,587
2	Saturday, 12 March 2:10pm	8.12 (60)	Essendon	**14.12 (96)**	Lost by 36 points	Waverley Park	5,992

== Regular season ==
Home team's score listed in bold:

Round	Date	Score	Opponent	Opponent's Score	Result	Venue	Attendance	Best on ground	Team
1	Saturday, 2 April 2:10pm	14.20 (104)	Geelong	**11.17 (83)**	Won by 21 points	Kardinia Park (stadium)	20,781	Alex Ishchenko	West Coast
2	Friday, 8 April 7:40pm	**26.19 (175)**	Essendon	11.10 (76)	Won by 99 points	WACA Ground	24,886	John Gastev	West Coast
3	Sunday, 17 April 2:10pm	**29.18 (192)**	Brisbane Bears	10.14 (74)	Won by 118 points	WACA Ground	16,354	Chris Mainwaring	West Coast
4	Saturday, 23 April 2:10pm	8.7 (55)	Collingwood	**13.16 (94)**	Lost by 87 points	Victoria Park	26,276	James Manson	Collingwood
5	Friday, 29 April 7:40pm	**14.16 (100)**	Footscray	14.9 (93)	Won by 7 points	WACA Ground	17,662	Ross Glendinning	West Coast
6	Friday, 6 May 7:40pm	17.8 (110)	North Melbourne	**17.23 (123)**	Lost by 13 points	Melbourne Cricket Ground	10,133	Donald McDonald	North Melbourne
7	Friday, 13 May 7:40pm	**17.10 (112)**	St Kilda	3.18 (36)	Won by 76 points	WACA Ground	12,803	Alex Ishchenko	West Coast
8	Sunday, 22 May 2:10pm	**9.9 (63)**	Hawthorn	17.14 (116)	Lost by 53 points	Subiaco Oval	27,344	Chris Wittman	Hawthorn
9	Sunday, 29 May 2:10pm	**12.15 (87)**	Carlton	15.10 (100)	Lost by 13 points	Subiaco Oval	27,663	Ken Hunter	Carlton
10	Sunday, 5 June 2:10pm	10.15 (75)	Richmond	**16.20 (116)**	Lost by 41 points	Melbourne Cricket Ground	7,157	Peter Wilson	Richmond
11	Monday, 13 June 2:10pm	10.13 (73)	Melbourne	**13.15 (93)**	Lost by 20 points	Melbourne Cricket Ground	28,045	Alan Johnson	Melbourne
12	Sunday, 19 June 2:10pm	8.13 (61)	Sydney	**14.20 (104)**	Lost by 43 points	Sydney Cricket Ground	12,664	Michael Parsons	Sydney
13	Sunday, 26 June 2:10pm	**17.19 (121)**	Fitzroy	13.9 (87)	Won by 34 points	Subiaco Oval	15,028	Wally Matera	West Coast
14	Saturday, 2 July 2:10pm	13.7 (85)	Essendon	**16.16 (112)**	Lost by 27 points	Windy Hill	10,298	Simon Madden	Essendon
15	Sunday, 10 July 2:10pm	**18.18 (126)**	Geelong	16.10 (106)	Won by 20 points	Subiaco Oval	18,537	Chris Mainwaring	West Coast
16	Friday, 15 July 7:40pm	**14.14 (98)**	Brisbane Bears	12.17 (89)	Won by 9 points	WACA Ground	16,074	Mark Withers	Brisbane Bears
17	Friday, 22 July 7:40pm	8.16 (64)	Fitzroy	**19.20 (134)**	Lost by 70 points	Melbourne Cricket Ground	7,611	John Ironmonger	Fitzroy
18	Sunday, 31 July 2:10pm	**18.14 (122)**	Melbourne	11.12 (78)	Won by 44 points	Subiaco Oval	16,266	Murray Rance	West Coast
19	Sunday, 7 August 2:10pm	**16.9 (115)**	North Melbourne	12.12 (84)	Won by 31 points	Subiaco Oval	18,193	Guy McKenna	West Coast
20	Saturday, 13 August 2:10pm	14.13 (97)	St Kilda	**13.10 (88)**	Won by 9 points	Moorabbin Oval	11,074	Laurie Keene	West Coast
21	Sunday, 21 August 7:40pm	**16.15 (111)**	Collingwood	7.9 (51)	Won by 60 points	Subiaco Oval	36,638	Karl Langdon	West Coast
22	Sunday, 28 August 2:10pm	7.11 (53)	Footscray	**3.11 (29)**	Won by 24 points	Western Oval	18,456	Chris Mainwaring	West Coast
EF	Saturday, 3 September 2:10pm	10.11 (71)	Melbourne	**11.7 (73)**	Lost by 2 points	Waverley Park	43,438	–	–

Source: AFLTables

== Ladder ==
**(P)**	Premiers
	Qualified for finals

#	Team	P	W	L	D	PF	PA	%	Pts
1	Hawthorn **(P)**	22	19	3	0	2791	1962	142.3	76
2	Collingwood	22	15	6	1	1948	1728	112.7	62
3	Carlton	22	15	7	0	2342	1961	119.4	60
4	West Coast	22	13	9	0	2199	1966	111.9	52
5	Melbourne	22	13	9	0	2003	1961	102.1	52
6	Essendon	22	12	10	0	2186	2017	108.4	48
7	Sydney	22	12	10	0	2169	2176	99.7	48
8	Footscray	22	11	11	0	1880	1803	104.3	44
9	Geelong	22	10	12	0	2356	2246	104.9	40
10	Richmond	22	8	14	0	2161	2540	85.1	32
11	North Melbourne	22	7	14	1	2361	2638	89.5	30
12	Fitzroy	22	7	15	0	2128	2538	83.8	28
13	Brisbane Bears	22	7	15	0	1806	2421	74.6	28
14	St Kilda	22	4	18	0	1708	2081	82.1	16

Rules for classification: 1. premiership points; 2. percentage; 3. points for
Average score: 97.5
Source: AFL Tables
