= Woolnough =

Woolnough is a surname. Notable people with the surname include:

- Adam Woolnough (born 1981), Australian professional rugby league player
- Brian Woolnough (1948–2012), British sports journalist
- Cash Woolnough (born 2011), Son of Adam Woolnough
- Don Woolnough (1920–2003), Australian bowls player
- Drew Woolnough, bassist in the band FVK
- Frank Woolnough (1845–1930), British museum curator
- George Woolnough, saddler in Tenterfield, New South Wales from 1908 until his retirement in 1960
- Hilda Woolnough (1934–2007), British artist and arts advocate who emigrated to Prince Edward Island, Canada
- James K. Woolnough (1910–1996), United States Army four-star general
- Jeff Woolnough, Canadian film and television director, with an active career beginning in the late 1980s
- Marc Woolnough (born 1980), Australian rules footballer
- Michael Woolnough (born 1952), Australian rules footballer
- Walter George Woolnough (1876–1958), Australian geologist
- Peter Allen (born Peter Richard Woolnough; 1944–1992), Australian singer-songwriter, musician and entertainer

== See also ==
- Mount Woolnough, mountain over 1,400 m, standing on the north side of Mackay Glacier, about midway between Mount Morrison and Mount Gran in Victoria Land
