= Oborne (surname) =

Oborne is an English surname. Notable people with the surname include:

- Brad Oborne (born 1980), Australian rules footballer
- Peter Oborne (born 1957), British journalist and broadcaster
- Rod Oborne (born 1952), Australian rules footballer and coach

== See also ==
- Osborne (name)
