= Peter Cloke =

Australian rules footballer

Personal information
- Full name: Peter Bruce Cloke
- Born: 2 July 1951 (age 75)
- Original team: Oakleigh Fourths
- Height: 185 cm (6 ft 1 in)
- Weight: 84 kg (185 lb)
- Positions: Centre half-forward / Centre half-back

Playing career^{1}
Years	Club	Games (Goals)
1970–1973	Richmond	28 (4)
1973–1974	Oakleigh	29 (69)
1975–1981	North Adelaide	145 (109)
Total		202 (182)
- ^{1} Playing statistics correct to the end of 1981.

Career highlights
- North Adelaide best and fairest 1975; North Adelaide best and fairest 1979; Magarey Medal runner-up 1979; Mail Medal 1982

Peter Bruce Cloke (born 2 July 1951) is a former Australian rules footballer who played with Richmond in the Victorian Football League (VFL) and North Adelaide in the South Australian National Football League (SANFL).

A key position player, Cloke was seen mostly at centre half-forward and centre half-back.

Cloke played his junior football at Oakleigh, from where he joined Richmond, to make his VFL debut in 1970. He played six league games that year, followed by 11 in 1971 and 10 in 1972. His only appearance in the 1973 VFL season came in Richmond's round four loss to North Melbourne and he finished the year at Oakleigh in the Victorian Football Association, having requested a clearance. Younger brother David Cloke joined Richmond in 1974, when Peter was playing another season with Oakleigh.

From 1975 to 1981, Cloke played for North Adelaide. He won their best and fairest award in his first year and another in 1979, when he also finished runner-up in the Magarey Medal, to John Duckworth.

After leaving North Adelaide, Cloke played for Bordertown in the Tatiara Football League where he served as captain-coach for four years. He won a Mail Medal in 1982.

His nephews, Travis, Cameron and Jason all played in the Australian Football League.
