= Alec Waterman =

Personal information
- Full name: Alec Edward Waterman
- Born: 19 August 1996 (age 30)
- Original team: Claremont (WAFL)
- Draft: No. 76, 2014 national draft (West Coast); 2021 Pre-season supplemental selection (Essendon)
- Height: 183 cm (6 ft 0 in)
- Weight: 89 kg (196 lb)
- Position: Forward

Playing career^{1}
Years	Club	Games (Goals)
2014–2016	West Coast	0 (0)
2021–2022	Essendon	22 (27)
2023	West Coast(WAFL)	5(2)
2024-	Claremont(WAFL)	15(22)
- ^{1} Playing statistics correct to the end of the 2022 season.

Alec Edward Waterman (born 19 August 1996) is an Australian rules footballer who formerly played for Essendon in the Australian Football League (AFL). He currently plays for Claremont in the West Australian Football League.

He was initially selected at pick 76 as a father son selection by West Coast in the 2014 AFL draft but failed to play a game. After various health and injury issues, including glandular fever and a post-viral fatigue illness, he was delisted at the conclusion of the 2016 season.

After an impressive 2020 season with WAFL club Claremont, where he kicked the most goals for the season in the league, he was invited to train with Essendon over the 2021 preseason. At the conclusion of the preseason he was signed by Essendon as pre-season supplemental selection. He made his debut for the Bombers in round 3, 2021 against St Kilda. He collected 12 disposals and 2 goals in a huge 75 point win for the club. On June 9, 2021 Essendon announced that Waterman had agreed to a one-year deal to remain on the rookie list for the 2022 season. He was delisted by Essendon at the end of the 2022 season.

He is the son of former West Coast premiership player Chris Waterman, and brother of current West Coast Eagles player Jake Waterman.
