= Jake Waterman =

Australian rules footballer (born 1998)

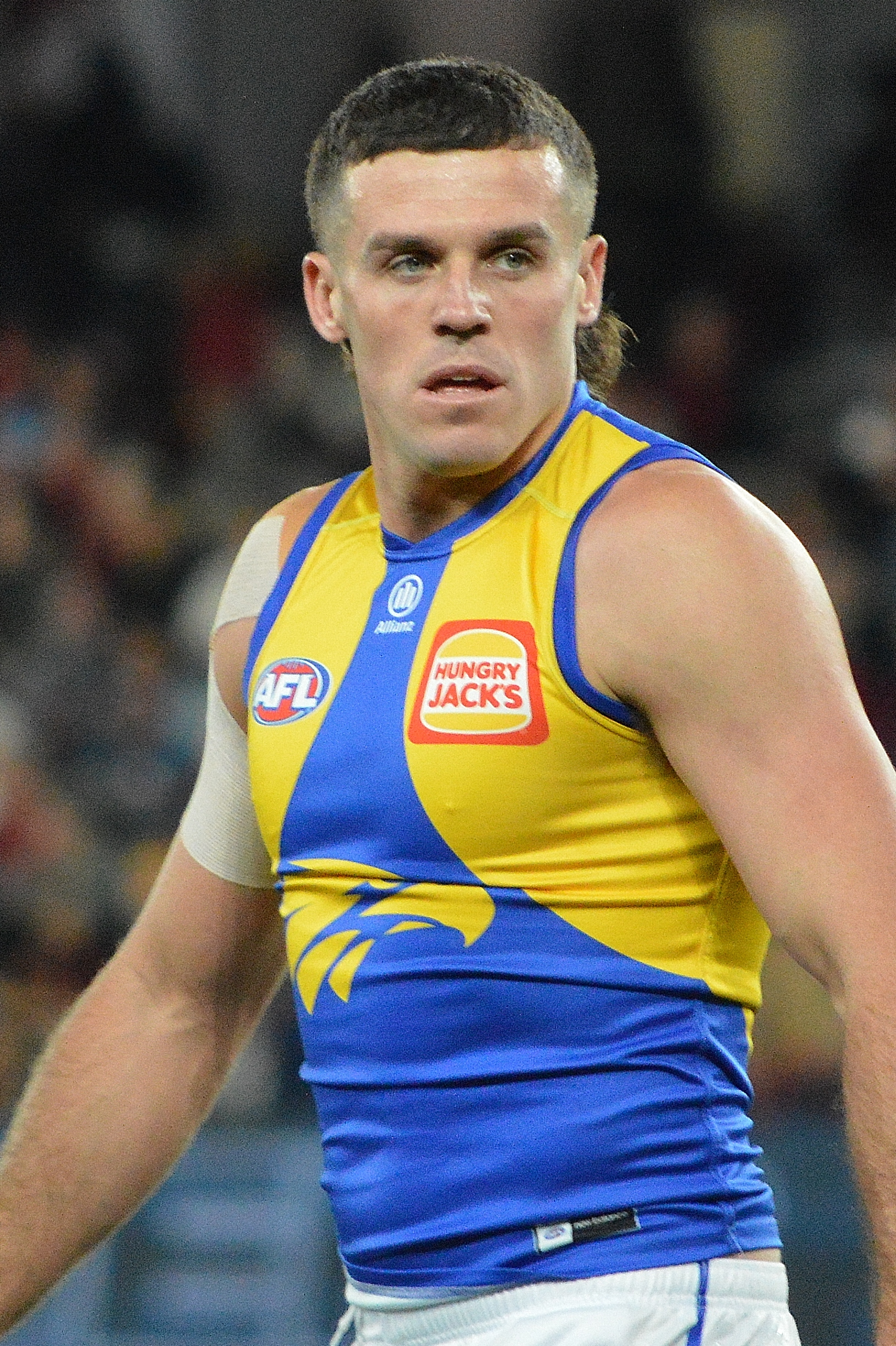
- Waterman in May 2026

Personal information
- Full name: Jake Christopher Waterman
- Born: 6 May 1998 (age 28); Perth, Western Australia
- Original team: Marist Football Club
- Draft: No. 77 (F/S), 2016 national draft
- Debut: Round 1, 2018, West Coast vs. Sydney, at Optus Stadium
- Height: 191 cm (6 ft 3 in)
- Weight: 92 kg (203 lb)
- Position: Key forward

Club information
- Current club: West Coast
- Number: 2

Playing career^{1}
Years	Club	Games (Goals)
2017–	West Coast	135 (198)

Representative team honours^{2}
Years	Team	Games (Goals)
2026	Western Australia	1 (2)
- ^{1} Playing statistics correct to the end of 2026.^{2} Representative statistics correct as of 2026.

Career highlights
- All-Australian team: 2024; 2× West Coast leading goalkicker: 2024, 2026; West Coast WAFL Leading Goalkicker: 2019; AFL Rising Star nominee: 2018

Jake Christopher Waterman (born 6 May 1998) is a professional Australian rules footballer playing for the West Coast Eagles in the Australian Football League (AFL). Jake is the son of dual West Coast premiership defender Chris Waterman, and brother of former Essendon forward Alec Waterman.

== AFL career ==
He was drafted by West Coast with their final selection and seventy-seventh overall in the 2016 national draft as a father-son selection. He made his debut in the twenty-nine point loss to Sydney at Optus Stadium in Round 1 of the 2018 season. In Round 6, Waterman was nominated for the AFL Rising Star award after recording fourteen disposals, five marks and two goals in the eight-point win over Fremantle at Optus Stadium.

=== 2023 ===
Waterman played 11 of the first 12 games of the 2023 AFL season, but was a late withdrawal in Round 13 against Adelaide in Adelaide due to illness. Upon returning to Perth he was diagnosed with severe ulcerative colitis, an autoimmune, inflammatory bowel disease. He was hospitalised for 10 days, losing 12 kg. In September, Waterman signed a two-year contract extension.

=== 2024 ===
In Round 5 of the 2024 AFL season, Waterman kicked a career-high six goals against Richmond at Optus Stadium. He was again impressive the next week in Western Derby 58, kicking five goals. He also kicked five goals in Round 10 during West Coast's 35-point win over Melbourne. Waterman finished the season as West Coast's leading goalkicker, having kicked 53 goals from 20 games, which placed him fifth in the Coleman Medal. For his performance throughout the year, he earnt a spot in the 2024 All-Australian team as a forward, and finished third in the West Coast Eagles' best and fairest award, the John Worsfold Medal. Already contracted until 2025, Waterman signed a four-year contract extension in October to remain at West Coast until at least 2029.

=== 2025 ===
In March, Waterman was voted into West Coast's leadership group. He only managed 8 games for the 2025 AFL season due to injury and didn't play again after Round 11. Despite this he still led the club for goals kicked up until Round 19, before eventually being overtaken by Jamie Cripps and Liam Ryan.

=== 2026 ===
In 2026, Waterman was picked to play for Western Australia in the revised State of Origin match against Victoria. His father Chris Waterman had previously represented Western Australia four times at state level in the 1990s, including as captain in 1998.

== Statistics ==
Updated to the end of round 22, 2026.

Legend
G	Goals	K	Kicks	D	Disposals	T	Tackles
B	Behinds	H	Handballs	M	Marks

Season	Team	No.	Games	Totals							Averages (per game)							Votes
Season	Team	No.	Games	G	B	K	H	D	M	T	G	B	K	H	D	M	T	Votes
2018	West Coast	45	16	13	12	118	60	178	75	23	0.8	0.8	7.4	3.8	11.1	4.7	1.4	0
2019	West Coast	2	13	15	5	112	45	157	75	16	1.2	0.4	8.6	3.5	12.1	5.8	1.2	0
2020 (Note: The 2020 season was played with 17 home-and-away matches per team (down from 22) and 16-minute quarters with time on (down from 20-minute quarters with time on) due to the impact of the COVID-19 pandemic.)	West Coast	2	10	9	2	78	25	103	51	8	0.9	0.2	7.8	2.5	10.3	5.1	0.8	0
2021	West Coast	2	14	13	8	129	44	173	89	27	0.9	0.6	9.2	3.1	12.4	6.4	1.9	0
2022	West Coast	2	20	18	11	143	42	185	97	32	0.9	0.6	7.2	2.1	9.3	4.9	1.6	0
2023	West Coast	2	11	11	9	112	46	158	71	23	1.0	0.8	10.2	4.2	14.4	6.5	2.1	2
2024	West Coast	2	20	53	23	191	61	252	137	22	2.7	1.2	9.6	3.1	12.6	6.9	1.1	7
2025	West Coast	2	8	17	9	57	24	81	49	5	2.1	1.1	7.1	3.0	10.1	6.1	0.6	0
2026	West Coast	2	21	46	52	205	53	258	131	27	2.2	2.5	9.8	2.5	12.3	6.2	1.3	0
Career			133	195	131	1145	400	1545	775	183	1.5	1.0	8.6	3.0	11.6	5.8	1.4	9
