= Glenn Molloy =

Australian rules footballer

Personal information
- Full name: Glenn Molloy
- Born: 13 September 1971 (age 55)
- Original team: Norwood (SANFL)
- Height: 186 cm (6 ft 1 in)
- Weight: 82 kg (181 lb)

Playing career^{1}
| Years | Club | Games (Goals) |
| 1990–1992 & 1997-1999 | Norwood | 80 (106) |
| 1993–1996 | Melbourne | 20 (4) |
| Total | | 100 (110) |
- ^{1} Playing statistics correct to the end of 1999.

Glenn Molloy (born 13 September 1971) is a former Australian rules footballer who played with Melbourne in the Australian Football League (AFL).

Originally from South Australian National Football League (SANFL) club Norwood, Molloy is the son of 67-game Melbourne player Graham Molloy and was drafted under the father–son rule.

A halfback, Molloy made his senior AFL debut in 1993 and made 20 appearances for Melbourne over four seasons, which included a semi-final in 1994.

He returned to Norwood in 1997 and was a member of their premiership team that year.
