= Ernie Hug =

Australian rules footballer

Personal information
- Full name: Ernest Leslie Hug
- Born: 4 March 1944
- Died: 17 June 1978 (aged 34); Heyfield, Victoria
- Original team: St Pat's
- Height: 193 cm (6 ft 4 in)
- Weight: 87 kg (192 lb)
- Position: Ruck / Defence

Playing career^{1}
| Years | Club | Games (Goals) |
| 1963–65, 1967–70 | Collingwood | 59 (5) |
| 1971 | South Melbourne | 15 (0) |
| Total | | 74 (5) |
- ^{1} Playing statistics correct to the end of 1971.

Ernest Leslie Hug (4 March 1944 – 17 June 1978) was an Australian rules footballer who played with Collingwood and South Melbourne in the Victorian Football League (VFL).

The child of parents Ernest Leslie Hug Snr (1919–1977) and Rosemary Eleanor Hug, nee Pavey (1924–2015), Ernest Leslie Hug was born at Dandenong on 4 March 1944. Hug married Kaylene Fidler in December 1968 and they had 4 children, Bernadene Voss, Ernie Hug 3rd, Catherine Hug and Peter Hug.

Hug's son, Ernie, 3rd. was drafted to Collingwood under the father-son rule in 1989 but failed to play a senior match for Collingwood. His other son Peter, died in 1999 from injuries sustained during a football match.

Ernie Hug died in 1978 after a tractor accident on his cattle farm in Heyfield, Victoria.
