= Ken Fletcher (Australian footballer) =

Australian rules footballer (born 1948)

Personal information
- Full name: Ken A. Fletcher
- Born: 21 January 1948 (age 78)
- Original team: Essendon High School
- Height: 184 cm (6 ft 0 in)
- Weight: 78 kg (172 lb)
- Position: Wing / half-back flank

Playing career^{1}
Years	Club	Games (Goals)
1967–1980	Essendon	264 (55)
- ^{1} Playing statistics correct to the end of 1980.

Career highlights
- Essendon captain: 1977-1979; Crichton Medal: 1978

Ken Fletcher (born 21 January 1948) is a former Australian rules footballer who played for the Essendon Bombers. He is the father of Dustin Fletcher, who was drafted into the club through the father–son rule.

A former Essendon High School student who grew up in East Keilor, Victoria, Fletcher had two footballers as neighbours: Ken Peucker (played with Essendon) and Ted Flemming, a WA Sandover Medal winner (1930). Ken and his older brother practised football skills daily in a nearby paddock as teenagers. Fletcher was a versatile footballer and played in many positions during his 264-game career for the Bombers. He excelled as a wingman and half-back flanker.

He won the club's best and fairest award in 1978 and represented Victoria throughout the 1970s. A broken leg forced him to retire in 1980, and he left the club as their fourth-most-experienced player in Essendon's history (ranked 11th as of 2024). He did, however, continue playing in country football as captain-coach of Tatura.

In Round 7 of 2014, Ken and his son Dustin claimed the record of most VFL/AFL games played by a father–son combination, with 648 games between them. Their record was finalised at 664 total games upon Dustin's retirement in 2015, aged 40, who is one of only five players in the history of the VFL/AFL to accomplish the 400-game milestone.

Fletcher worked as a physical education teacher. He taught for many years at Penleigh and Essendon Grammar School, where he was particularly successful as coach of the First XVIII.
