= Dustin Fletcher =

Australian rules footballer, born 1975

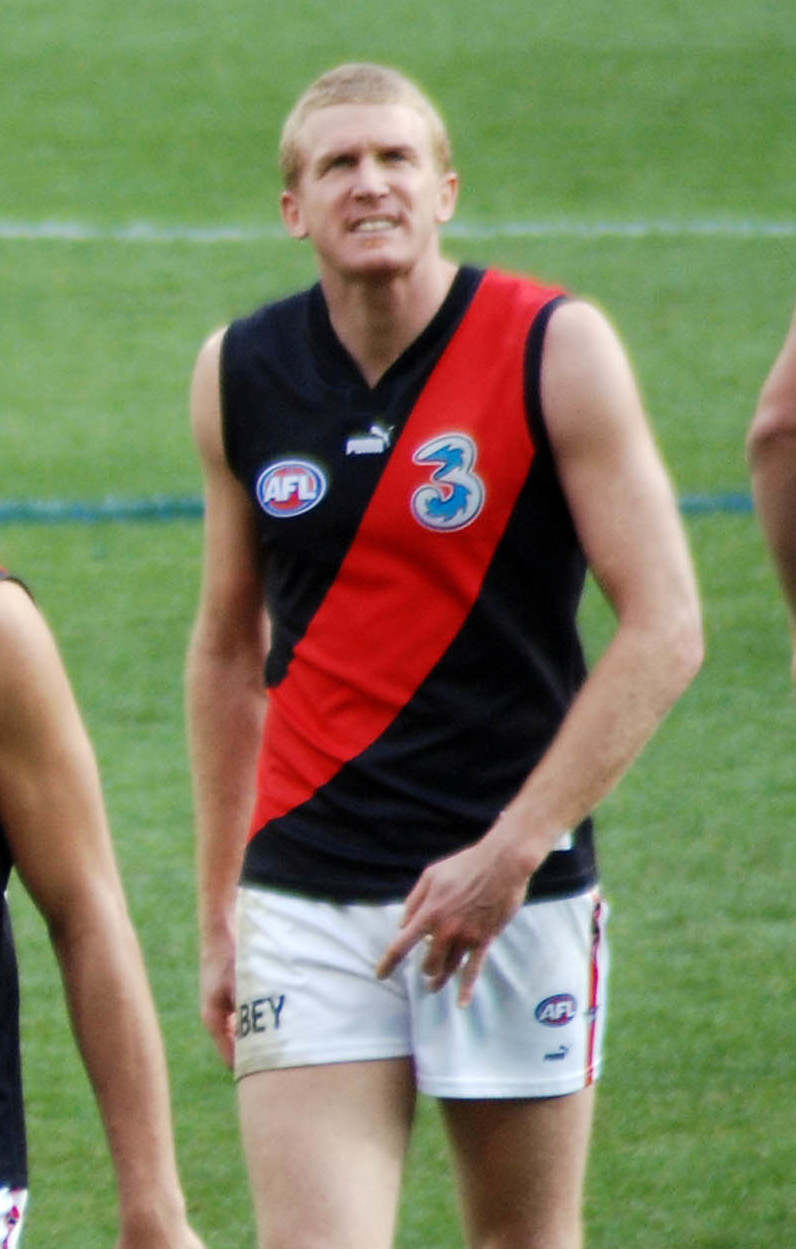
- Fletcher in August 2007

Personal information
- Full name: Dustin Andrew Fletcher
- Born: 7 May 1975 (age 51)
- Original team: Western Jets (TAC Cup)
- Draft: (F/S), 1992 national draft
- Height: 198 cm (6 ft 6 in)
- Weight: 92 kg (203 lb)
- Position: Defender

Playing career^{1}
Years	Club	Games (Goals)
1993–2015	Essendon	400 (71)

International team honours^{2}
Years	Team	Games (Goals)
2005–2015	Australia	8 (0)
- ^{1} Playing statistics correct to the end of 2015.^{2} Representative statistics correct as of 2015.

Career highlights
- 2× AFL premiership player: 1993, 2000; Australian Football Hall of Fame; 2× All-Australian team: 2000, 2007; Crichton Medal: 2000; 2× AFL pre-season premiership: 1994, 2000; 1993 AFL Rising Star: nominee

Dustin Andrew Fletcher (born 7 May 1975) is a former professional Australian rules footballer who played for the Essendon Football Club in the Australian Football League (AFL). He is widely acknowledged as one of the finest defenders in the history of the league, and one of only six players in the history of the VFL/AFL competition to play 400 games. Fletcher is a member of the Australian Football Hall of Fame, and a Legend in the Essendon Hall of Fame.

== AFL career ==
Fletcher was recruited by the Essendon Football Club in the 1992 National Draft. He played his first senior game against Carlton in his senior year of high school at Penleigh and Essendon Grammar School.

Right from the get-go, Fletcher proved to be a highly impactful player. At 18 years old, he won a Longest Kick competition, a highly desirable trait that would serve him well for the next 22 years. He was a key member of the 1993 premiership team in his first AFL season, a team which is often referred to as the "Baby Bombers".

Fletcher also played in the 2000 premiership team, a year in which he also won the Crichton Medal as Essendon's best and fairest and was selected in the All-Australian team.

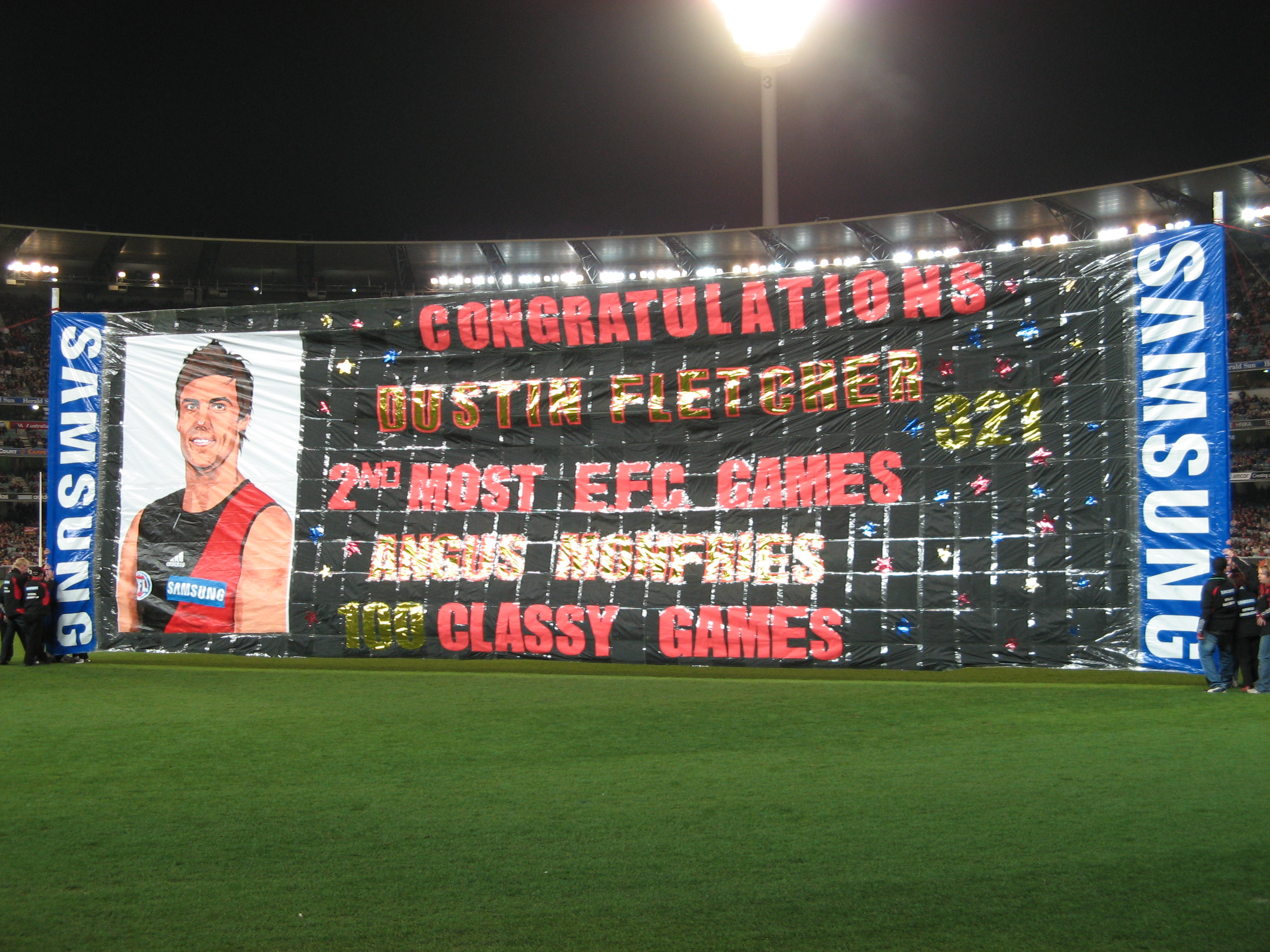
A banner congratulating Fletcher in 2010

Noted for his longevity in the game, Fletcher played a total of 400 senior VFL/AFL games, which stands as the fifth-highest number of games by any player as of 2023. His AFL career length of 22 years and 58 days is an all-time league record (edging out Vic Cumberland, whose former record was five days shy of 22 years). Fletcher played his 400th game in Round 9, 2015, becoming the third player in VFL/AFL history to reach the milestone (after Michael Tuck and Kevin Bartlett); it would end up being his final game, as he was unable to recover from a groin injury sustained during the match. He holds the outright Essendon games record, having overtaken the previous record of 378 games held by Simon Madden in Round 1, 2014. He is the second-oldest player to play a VFL/AFL game, aged 40 years and 23 days at the time of his final game, behind only the aforementioned Vic Cumberland (who played the 1920 season at the age of 43). With his father, Ken, the Fletchers hold the record for the most VFL/AFL career games played by a father and son, with 664 games between them.

On 12 January 2016, during the summer after his retirement, Fletcher was named as one of 34 past and present Essendon players found guilty over their use of illegal supplements during the 2012 AFL season. As a result, Fletcher was suspended from playing at all levels for 24 months, which with backdating and provisional suspension served resulted in suspension until November 2016. However, Fletcher had already retired the previous year, so the suspension was moot.

After serving his suspension, Fletcher returned in 2017 to play suburban football for Essendon Doutta Stars.

Fletcher was inducted into the Australian Football Hall of Fame in 2026, and is a Legend in the Essendon Hall of Fame, having been inducted in 2022.

== Kicking style ==
Fletcher's execution of the torpedo punt was often used as a set-play clearing strategy by coach Kevin Sheedy. In a game in 2007, he kicked a torpedo punt goal from more than 70 metres. According to The Sunday Age, it was the fifth-longest kick in the history of the VFL/AFL.

== International rules series ==
Fletcher served as the Australia international rules football team's goalkeeper for five series: the 2005 series, the 2006 series, the 2010 series, the 2014 series, and the 2015 series. Along with Barry Hall, Fletcher was one of Australia's co-captains for the 2006 series. He is regarded as Australia's greatest keeper throughout the series. He retired from top-level football with a final International Rules match, at the 2015 series in Ireland.

== Personal life ==
Dustin's son Mason is the former punter for the University of Cincinnati Bearcats in American football. Dustin's son Max is the current punter for the University of Cincinnati Bearcats and formerly played at the University of Arkansas. In Mason's freshman (first) season in 2021, the Bearcats became the first-ever team from a Group of Five conference to reach the College Football Playoff. (Note: The Group of Five is a de facto grouping of five conferences that participate in NCAA Division I FBS, the top level of American college football. It is distinguished from the Power Five in that the Power Five are primary partners in the de facto FBS championship, the College Football Playoff.) Mason's sophomore season in 2022, the Bearcats' last before joining the Power Five Big 12 Conference, saw him named the special teams player of the year in the American Athletic Conference.

== Statistics ==
Legend
G	Goals	K	Kicks	D	Disposals	T	Tackles
B	Behinds	H	Handballs	M	Marks

Season	Team	No.	Games	Totals							Averages (per game)						
Season	Team	No.	Games	G	B	K	H	D	M	T	G	B	K	H	D	M	T
1993†	Essendon	31	17	0	0	128	45	173	43	24	0.0	0.0	7.5	2.6	10.2	2.5	1.4
1994	Essendon	31	13	2	0	76	41	117	27	10	0.2	0.0	5.8	3.2	9.0	2.1	0.8
1995	Essendon	31	22	4	3	199	101	300	94	23	0.2	0.1	9.0	4.6	13.6	4.3	1.0
1996	Essendon	31	23	16	10	235	52	287	105	16	0.7	0.4	10.2	2.3	12.5	4.6	0.7
1997	Essendon	31	16	9	2	175	62	237	76	14	0.6	0.1	10.9	3.9	14.8	4.8	0.9
1998	Essendon	31	18	4	2	186	39	225	57	16	0.2	0.1	10.3	2.2	12.5	3.2	0.9
1999	Essendon	31	19	3	8	198	51	249	74	18	0.2	0.4	10.4	2.7	13.1	3.9	1.0
2000†	Essendon	31	23	14	6	276	81	357	93	26	0.6	0.3	12.0	3.5	15.5	4.0	1.1
2001	Essendon	31	21	4	4	239	62	301	78	18	0.2	0.2	11.4	3.0	14.3	3.7	0.9
2002	Essendon	31	18	3	2	202	44	246	51	30	0.2	0.1	11.2	2.4	13.7	2.8	1.7
2003	Essendon	31	14	0	0	145	34	179	44	14	0.0	0.0	10.4	2.4	12.8	3.1	1.0
2004	Essendon	31	20	1	3	220	42	262	70	28	0.0	0.2	11.0	2.1	13.1	3.5	1.4
2005	Essendon	31	17	0	0	226	37	263	70	13	0.0	0.0	13.3	2.2	15.5	4.1	0.8
2006	Essendon	31	16	0	0	211	67	278	98	12	0.0	0.0	13.2	4.2	17.4	6.1	0.8
2007	Essendon	31	19	3	2	309	85	394	144	30	0.2	0.1	16.3	4.5	20.7	7.6	1.6
2008	Essendon	31	18	2	3	198	84	282	96	18	0.1	0.2	11.0	4.7	15.7	5.3	1.0
2009	Essendon	31	18	1	1	218	102	320	86	30	0.1	0.1	12.1	5.7	17.8	4.8	1.7
2010	Essendon	31	16	1	1	216	75	291	79	28	0.1	0.1	13.5	4.7	18.2	4.9	1.8
2011	Essendon	31	19	1	0	213	76	289	77	32	0.0	0.0	11.2	4.0	15.2	4.0	1.7
2012	Essendon	31	18	1	2	244	45	289	88	20	0.1	0.1	13.6	2.5	16.1	4.9	1.1
2013	Essendon	31	13	0	0	151	47	198	63	14	0.0	0.0	11.6	3.6	15.2	4.8	1.1
2014	Essendon	31	15	1	0	198	81	279	103	11	0.1	0.0	13.2	5.4	18.6	6.9	0.7
2015	Essendon	31	7	1	1	80	36	116	35	6	0.1	0.1	11.4	5.1	16.6	5.0	0.9
Career			400	71	50	4543	1389	5932	1751	451	0.2	0.1	11.4	3.5	14.8	4.4	1.1

== Honours and achievements ==
- Team
  - AFL premiership: 1993, 2000
  - AFL pre-season premiership: 1994, 2000
  - McClelland Trophy: 1993, 1999, 2000, 2001
- Individual
  - Australian Football Hall of Fame (inducted 2026)
  - All-Australian team: 2000, 2007
  - Crichton Medal: 2000
  - AFL Rising Star Nominee: 1993
  - International Rules Series Player: 2005, 2006, 2010, 2014, 2015

== See also ==
- List of VFL/AFL players to have played 300 games
- List of VFL/AFL records
