= Chris Waterman =

Australian rules footballer (born 1968)

Personal information
- Full name: Christopher John Waterman
- Nickname: Muddy
- Born: 19 September 1968 (age 58)
- Original team: East Fremantle
- Height: 180 cm (5 ft 11 in)
- Weight: 86 kg (190 lb)

Playing career^{1}
Years	Club	Games (Goals)
1987–1998	East Fremantle	61 (42)
1988–1998	West Coast Eagles	177 (75)
Total		238 (117)

Coaching career
Years	Club	Games (W–L–D)
2006–2009	Peel Thunder	80 (24–56–0)
2010–2012	Subiaco	63 (31–32–0)
- ^{1} Playing statistics correct to the end of 1998.

Career highlights
- West Coast premiership side 1992, 1994; West Coast Best Clubman 1991

Christopher John Waterman (born 19 September 1968) is a former Australian rules football player and coach. Waterman's playing career started in Rossmoyne's junior football zone where he was eventually recruited by the East Fremantle Football Club at the age of fifteen. He played in the club's Colts, Reserves and Senior line-up and finished with a total of 61 senior games. In 1988 Waterman made his AFL debut wearing a West Coast Eagles guernsey, and under the guidance of coaches John Todd and Mick Malthouse, went on to play a total of 177 matches (including 22 AFL finals, 3 Grand Finals and 2 Premierships) for the club and earned "Player Life Member" status. Chris retired in 1998.

In 1999 Waterman began his coaching career, taking the role of defensive coach for his former club, the West Coast Eagles. in 2001, he was appointed defensive coach of the Fremantle Dockers until the end of 2005. Waterman also coached both the 2004 and 2005 Western Australian State teams and was assistant coach for the 2007 and 2008 State Team.

In 2006, Chris Waterman became the Senior Coach of the Peel Thunder Football Club and in 2008 signed a 3-year contract which would see him remain at the club until 2010.

At the end of the 2009 WAFL season, Chris Waterman resigned as head coach of Peel Thunder and is currently looking to get back into the coaching at AFL level.

Waterman's sons, Alec and Jake were both drafted by the West Coast under the Father–son rule, although Alec played for Essendon for the 2021 and 2022 seasons before returning to West Coast into a dual roal as development coach and as a player in the WAFL side

== Statistics ==
Legend
G	Goals	K	Kicks	D	Disposals	T	Tackles
B	Behinds	H	Handballs	M	Marks

Season	Team	No.	Games	Totals							Averages (per game)							Votes
Season	Team	No.	Games	G	B	K	H	D	M	T	G	B	K	H	D	M	T	Votes
1988	West Coast	31	7	2	2	89	18	107	27	7	0.3	0.3	12.7	2.6	15.3	3.9	1.0	0
1989	West Coast	31	10	10	3	110	38	148	42	12	1.0	0.3	11.0	3.8	14.8	4.2	1.2	0
1990	West Coast	31	6	13	9	49	16	65	25	10	2.2	1.5	8.2	2.7	10.8	4.2	1.7	0
1991	West Coast	39	26	6	3	308	127	435	65	29	0.2	0.1	11.8	4.9	16.7	2.5	1.1	2
1992†	West Coast	39	24	6	6	287	118	405	98	48	0.3	0.3	12.0	4.9	16.9	4.1	2.0	0
1993	West Coast	39	20	15	20	224	108	332	92	28	0.8	1.0	11.2	5.4	16.6	4.6	1.4	2
1994†	West Coast	39	18	3	4	127	56	183	54	17	0.2	0.2	7.1	3.1	10.2	3.0	0.9	0
1995	West Coast	39	20	8	7	243	120	363	103	28	0.4	0.4	12.2	6.0	18.2	5.2	1.4	10
1996	West Coast	39	12	7	7	161	55	216	55	19	0.6	0.6	13.4	4.6	18.0	4.6	1.6	0
1997	West Coast	39	12	0	1	114	68	182	41	15	0.0	0.1	9.5	5.7	15.2	3.4	1.3	0
1998	West Coast	39	22	5	10	265	146	411	112	30	0.2	0.5	12.0	6.6	18.7	5.1	1.4	1
Career			177	75	72	1977	870	2847	714	243	0.4	0.4	11.2	4.9	16.1	4.0	1.4	15
