= Brad Oborne =

Australian rules footballer (born 1980)

Personal information
- Full name: Brad Oborne
- Born: 19 June 1980 (age 46)
- Original team: Preston Knights
- Draft: 35th, 1998 AFL draft Father–son rule
- Height: 176 cm (5 ft 9 in)
- Weight: 80 kg (176 lb)

Playing career^{1}
Years	Club	Games (Goals)
1999–2000	Collingwood	5 (4)
- ^{1} Playing statistics correct to the end of 2000.

Brad Oborne (born 19 June 1980) is a former Australian rules footballer who played with Collingwood in the Australian Football League (AFL).

The 35th selection from the 1998 AFL draft, Oborne was secured by Collingwood under the father–son rule, as his father Rod Oborne had played for the club in the 1970s. He was drafted from TAC Cup side the Preston Knights, having earlier played with Montmorency.

He played four games for Collingwood in the 1999 AFL season and had his best performance against the Brisbane Lions at the Gabba when he kicked three goals. The following year he was called up to the seniors just once and at the end of the season was delisted by Collingwood.
