= Alex Ishchenko =

Australian rules footballer

Personal information
- Born: 20 April 1964 (age 62); Perth, Western Australia
- Original team: East Perth (WAFL)
- Height: 201 cm (6 ft 7 in)
- Weight: 118 kg (260 lb)

Playing career^{1}
Years	Club	Games (Goals)
1982–1988	East Perth	53 (24)
1987–1988	West Coast	30 (10)
1989–1991	Brisbane	42 (15)
1992–1995	North Melbourne	70 (12)
Total		195 (61)
- ^{1} Playing statistics correct to the end of 1995.

Career highlights
- Brisbane reserves premiership side 1991; North Melbourne reserves premiership side 1995

Alex Ishchenko (born 20 April 1964) is a former Australian rules footballer who played for West Coast, Brisbane and North Melbourne in the (VFL)/(AFL).

A ruckman, Ishchenko was born in Perth, Western Australia and made his VFL debut in 1987 with West Coast. After two seasons with West Coast he moved to Brisbane, which included playing the 1991 AFL reserves Grand Final before finishing his career at North Melbourne, which included playing the 1995 AFL reserves Grand Final. He is a part-time ruck coach for North Melbourne in the AFL.
