= Jason Cloke =

Australian rules footballer (born 1982)

Personal information
- Born: 6 May 1982 (age 44)
- Original team: Park Orchards / Eastern Ranges
- Debut: Round 2, 6 April 2002, Collingwood vs. West Coast Eagles, at the MCG
- Height: 189 cm (6 ft 2 in)
- Weight: 90 kg (198 lb)

Playing career^{1}
Years	Club	Games (Goals)
2002–2006	Collingwood	76 (10)
- ^{1} Playing statistics correct to the end of 2006.

Career highlights
- 2002 AFL Rising Star nominee; Harry Collier Trophy 2002; Joseph Wren Memorial Trophy 2005

Jason Cloke (born 6 May 1982) is an Australian rules footballer, who played in the Australian Football League with the Collingwood Football Club.

== Career ==
Cloke played his junior football for Park Orchards in the Eastern Junior Football League, and played TAC Cup football for the Eastern Ranges. Cloke's father, David had played 219 games for Richmond and 114 games for Collingwood in the 1970s and 1980s; this meant that Cloke was eligible to be drafted by either team under the Father–son rule. Both clubs were interested, but it was Collingwood who recruited Cloke with a second-round draft pick in the 2000 AFL draft (#19 overall). Jason's younger brothers, Cameron and Travis, would also be drafted by Collingwood under the father–son rule in the following years.

Cloke spent the 2001 season playing with VFL-affiliate, Williamstown. He made his senior AFL debut in Round 2, 2002, against the West Coast Eagles at the MCG. He swiftly made a name for himself, earning an AFL Rising Star nomination in his fifth match (Round 6 against St Kilda at Colonial Stadium), and playing a damaging role as a loose man in defence throughout the season.

After playing every match for the 2002 season after Round 2, Cloke received a two-match suspension in the club's preliminary final victory against Adelaide, for striking Tyson Edwards in a marking contest. Collingwood appealed the decision, but the appeal was rejected, and Cloke missed the Grand Final loss against Brisbane Lions.

In 2003, Cloke played 20 games, including the Grand Final, but was also demoted to the VFL twice during the season. He played three more seasons for Collingwood, and was delisted at the end of 2006, after a total of 76 games for the club.

In 2007, Cloke played for Bendigo in the Victorian Football League, finishing second in the club's best and fairest award. In 2008, he shifted to Williamstown. (Cloke had previously played for Williamstown when Collingwood was its AFL-affiliate, although by 2008 this affiliation had ended). He played two seasons for Williamstown, then returned to Bendigo in 2010. From 2011 until 2014 he played for Spotswood in the Western Region Football League, where he served as a playing assistant coach, and was part of the Woodsmen's 2011 premiership team. He shifted to Craigieburn in the Essendon District Football League in 2015. Cloke recently signed with EDFL team Jacana for the 2018 season.

In 2024, Cloke was playing for Broadbeach Cats in an AFL Masters over 35s game when he was elbowed from behind by an opposing player from the Burleigh Bombers. Cloke was taken to hospital and the other player was sent from the field and is to face the tribunal.

== Family ==
Cloke is the eldest son of David Cloke, who played 333 VFL/AFL games: 219 for Richmond in two stints (1974–1982, 1990–1991) including two premierships; and 114 for Collingwood (1983–1989). Cloke has two younger brothers who have spent time in the AFL: Cameron who played 58 AFL games for three clubs (21 for Collingwood, 36 for Carlton and 1 for Port Adelaide) between 2004 and 2010; and Travis Cloke, who retired after the 2017 season, playing 256 games with Collingwood (2005–2016) and 10 with the Western Bulldogs (2017). His uncle (David's brother), Peter, also played 28 games for Richmond from 1970 and was second in the South Australian National Football League's Magarey Medal in 1979.
