= Andrew McKay (Australian footballer) =

Australian rules footballer (born 1970)

Personal information
- Born: 14 July 1970 (age 56); Adelaide, South Australia, Australia
- Original team: Lucindale/St Peter's College
- Debut: Round 1, 27 March 1993, Carlton vs. Fitzroy, at Princes Park
- Height: 186 cm (6 ft 1 in)
- Weight: 90 kg (198 lb)
- Position: Half-back

Playing career^{1}
Years	Club	Games (Goals)
1991–1992	Glenelg	40 (2)
1993–2003	Carlton	244 (28)

Representative team honours
Years	Team	Games (Goals)
1993–1999	South Australia	6
- ^{1} Playing statistics correct to the end of 2003.

Career highlights
- Magarey Medal runner-up: 1992; 4x All-Australian team: 1993, 1999, 2000, 2001; AFL premiership player: 1995; Fos Williams Medal: 1999; Carlton best and fairest: 2003; South Australian Football Hall of Fame inductee: 2007

Andrew Ian McKay (born 14 July 1970) is a former Australian rules footballer who played for Carlton Football Club in the Australian Football League (AFL) and Glenelg Football Club in the South Australian National Football League (SANFL).

== Playing career ==
McKay grew up in south eastern South Australia, and played junior football for Lucindale in the Kowree Naracoorte Football League. Recruited by South Australian National Football League (SANFL) club Glenelg, McKay moved to Adelaide in 1991 and played 40 games for Glenelg as a half-back flanker, finishing second in the Magarey Medal in 1992 behind Port Adelaide's Nathan Buckley.

=== Carlton ===
McKay was recruited by Carlton Football Club with its first round selection in the 1992 AFL draft (No. 13 overall), although he was later fined $10,000 when it emerged that he had contacted four of the AFL's struggling clubs (Sydney, Brisbane Bears, Richmond and Fitzroy) and warned them that he would stay in South Australia if one of those clubs drafted him – which contravened the AFL's draft tampering rules. He nevertheless remained eligible to play for Carlton, and he made his debut in Round 1, 1993, immediately displaying the outstanding defensive skills that he had displayed at Glenelg. In his first AFL season, McKay was named on the half-back flank in the All-Australian team. He also represented South Australia at State of Origin that season, a feat he repeated in 1994 and 1995. In 1995, McKay was a member of Carlton's premiership team, the only premiership in his senior career. McKay played 15 of Carlton's 24 matches in the 1996 AFL season.

Continuing with Carlton, McKay played two more matches for South Australia, and was the winner of the Fos Williams Medal before the end of top-level State of Origin football in 1999. He made the All-Australian team as half-back flanker three times consecutively in 1999, 2000 and 2001, bringing his career tally to four. In 2003, McKay's final season, he assumed the Carlton captaincy following the mid-season retirement of Brett Ratten, and also won Carlton's Best and Fairest award for the only time in his career and McKay announced his retirement from his playing career at the end of the 2003 season.

McKay played a total of 244 games and kicked a total of 28 goals for Carlton Football Club from 1993 until 2003. He was also member of Carlton's 1995 premiership team.

McKay is a life member and Hall of Fame Inductee of the Carlton Football Club. In 2007, he was inducted into the South Australian Football Hall of Fame.

== Sports administration career ==
After retiring from his playing career, McKay joined the newly formed Match Review Panel, set up in 2005 as an overhaul of the AFL Tribunal system; from 2007 until 2009, he served as Chairman of that panel. He has also been involved in the Laws of the Game Committee.

In October 2011, McKay was appointed to the position as General Manager of Football at the Carlton Football Club, when he replaced the outgoing Steven Icke. In August 2018, McKay stepped down from his position as General Manager of Football at the Carlton Football Club. He was replaced by Brad Lloyd.

On 23 September 2026, McKay joined the board of directors at the Carlton Football Club.

== Personal life ==
While still playing in 1996, McKay began a degree in veterinary science, studying at the University of Queensland. To balance his study with his football career, McKay trained with the University of Queensland Australian Football Club whilst commuting to Melbourne on most weekends to play matches with Carlton.

Since retiring from his playing career, McKay has practised as a veterinarian. He has three children, all of whom have played football in some capacity. In October 2018, Andrew's daughter Abbie was selected by Carlton with Pick 16 in the 2018 AFL Women's Draft and in doing so made history being the first ever father–daughter selection in the Australian Rules Football history. Abbie's sister Sophie was also drafted by Carlton in 2024 with Pick 17, playing every game of the 2025 season and kicking 12 goals en route to the Finals.

== Statistics ==
Legend
G	Goals	K	Kicks	D	Disposals	T	Tackles
B	Behinds	H	Handballs	M	Marks

Season	Team	No.	Games	Totals							Averages (per game)							Votes
Season	Team	No.	Games	G	B	K	H	D	M	T	G	B	K	H	D	M	T	Votes
1993	Carlton	5	23	7	7	223	148	371	72	34	0.3	0.3	9.7	6.4	16.1	3.1	1.5	2
1994	Carlton	5	23	4	5	199	174	373	69	50	0.2	0.2	8.6	7.6	16.2	3.0	2.2	3
1995†	Carlton	5	25	1	2	238	163	401	90	31	0.0	0.1	9.5	6.5	16.0	3.6	1.2	4
1996	Carlton	5	15	4	3	97	89	186	36	26	0.3	0.2	6.5	5.9	12.4	2.4	1.7	0
1997	Carlton	5	22	2	3	191	159	350	80	34	0.1	0.1	8.7	7.2	15.9	3.6	1.5	2
1998	Carlton	5	20	3	2	172	164	336	59	27	0.2	0.1	8.6	8.2	16.8	3.0	1.4	2
1999	Carlton	5	26	2	2	269	157	426	95	46	0.1	0.1	10.3	6.0	16.4	3.7	1.8	9
2000	Carlton	5	25	3	7	271	206	477	121	51	0.1	0.3	10.8	8.2	19.1	4.8	2.0	8
2001	Carlton	5	24	2	3	247	176	423	124	33	0.1	0.1	10.3	7.3	17.6	5.2	1.4	9
2002	Carlton	5	19	0	3	171	114	285	77	51	0.0	0.2	9.0	6.0	15.0	4.1	2.7	2
2003	Carlton	5	22	0	3	189	125	314	66	40	0.0	0.1	8.6	5.7	14.3	3.0	1.8	4
Career			244	28	40	2267	1675	3942	889	423	0.1	0.2	9.3	6.9	16.2	3.6	1.7	45
