= Cameron Cloke =

Australian rules footballer (born 1984)

Personal information
- Full name: Cameron Cloke
- Born: 20 December 1984 (age 41)
- Original team: Eastern Ranges (TAC Cup)
- Draft: No. 43 (F/S), 2002 national draft No. 9, 2006 pre-season draft No. 41, 2010 rookie draft
- Height: 196 cm (6 ft 5 in)
- Weight: 100 kg (220 lb)
- Position: Ruckman/Forward

Playing career^{1}
Years	Club	Games (Goals)
2004–2006	Collingwood	21 (11)
2007–2009	Carlton	36 (25)
2010	Port Adelaide	1 (0)
Total		58 (36)
- ^{1} Playing statistics correct to the end of 2010.

Cameron Cloke (born 20 December 1984) is a former professional Australian rules footballer who played for the Collingwood Football Club, Carlton Football Club and Port Adelaide Football Club in the Australian Football League (AFL). He is the son of former Richmond and Collingwood player, David Cloke and the brother of Jason and Travis Cloke.

== Australian Football career ==
Cloke was drafted under the father-son rule in the 2002 National draft. Like his older brother Jason, Cloke was given time to develop at Williamstown in his first year at Collingwood. Cloke made his debut against Essendon in 2004 and played mostly as a tall forward. He played most of the first half of the 2005 AFL season as a ruckman and used his size well, however Cloke's season was ended by shoulder injury. More shoulder injuries occurred for Cloke in 2006 and managed only two senior games for the year.

Cloke and his brother Jason were delisted by Collingwood at the end of the 2006 season but Cloke was given a second chance at AFL level when he was selected in the pre-season draft by Carlton with their second round selection (ninth pick overall). He enjoyed a great start to his career at Carlton, which saw him play a key second ruck role during the Blues' successful 2007 NAB Cup campaign.

On 9 May 2007, during a routine training drill, Cloke sustained a season-ending injury by dislocating his shoulder. Upon return in 2008, Cloke resumed his place in the Carlton ruck line-up, often playing as the first ruckman for the team or floating forward to provide a marking option.

On 6 February 2009 during an intra-club match at Visy Park, Cloke was punched and kicked in an off the ball incident by teammate Setanta Ó hAilpín. Ó hAilpín was suspended by the club for about a month as a result of the incident.

In 2009 Cloke moved out of the main ruck position, playing more exclusively as a tall forward who would take ruck tap-outs in the forward line. He struggled to maintain a regular position in the Carlton lineup, playing 10 games with the Blues and half of the season with Carlton's VFL-affiliate, the Northern Bullants, where he scored 39 goals in 13 games, including five in a losing grand final, to be the Bullants' leading goalkicker for the year. On 24 August 2009, Cloke was suspended by Carlton for one game for being late to a recovery session. Cloke was delisted by Carlton on 13 November 2009.

There were talks that AFL clubs Hawthorn, Port Adelaide and Richmond were interested in recruiting Cloke in the 2010 pre-season draft. Cloke was ultimately recruited in the Rookie Draft by Port Adelaide with its third round pick (41). His first and only match for Port was against Brisbane in round 3, 2010, and spent most of the season allocated to the Port Adelaide Magpies in the South Australian National Football League (SANFL). Cloke was delisted at the end of the 2010 season.

Cloke played the following decade with success at suburban level. He played for Bundoora in the Northern Football League (NFL) from 2011 until 2014, winning Division 1 premierships there in 2011 and 2013. In 2013, he won the Frank Rosbrook Trophy as the best and fairest in the NFL top division; in an unusual case, Cloke was initially announced as the joint-winner with Mark Lynch (Heidelberg) when the award was counted in September 2013; but in February 2014, an administrative error which incorrectly credited Lynch three extra votes was uncovered, leading the NFL to amend its records and award Cloke the trophy outright. He later played for Craigieburn in the Essendon District Football League in 2015 and 2016; Jacana (EDFL) in 2017 and 2019, where he won a Division 2 premiership in 2017; Hurstbridge (NFNL) in 2018 and 2021; Barooga (Murray Football League) also in 2018; and Templestowe (Eastern Football League) in 2022 and 2023, before retiring. He also made two guest appearances for the Burnie Dockers Football Club in the TSL in 2015.

In 2026, Cloke signed for Watsonia Football Club (NFNL).
