= Marc Woolnough =

Australian rules footballer

Personal information
- Full name: Marc Woolnough
- Born: 20 May 1980 (age 46)
- Original team: Southport
- Draft: No. 29 (F/S), 1997 national draft
- Height: 195 cm (6 ft 5 in)
- Weight: 92 kg (203 lb)
- Position: Forward

Playing career^{1}
Years	Club	Games (Goals)
1998-2002	Geelong	6 (1)
- ^{1} Playing statistics correct to the end of 2002.

Marc Woolnough (born 20 May 1980) is a former Australian rules footballer who played six games for Geelong in 1998 and 2002.

Woolnough was raised on the Gold Coast, Queensland and attended All Saints Anglican School with Kurt Tippett both representing the school in the Independent Schools competition before going on to play with the Southport Sharks in the QAFL

He is the son of former Geelong and Collingwood player Michael Woolnough. Due to his father playing over 100 games for Geelong, he was father-son drafted to the Cats. After retiring from playing, he coached St Mary's in the Geelong Football League. He was appointed coach of the Melbourne University Football Club in 2008.
