= Travis Cloke =

Australian rules footballer (born 1987)

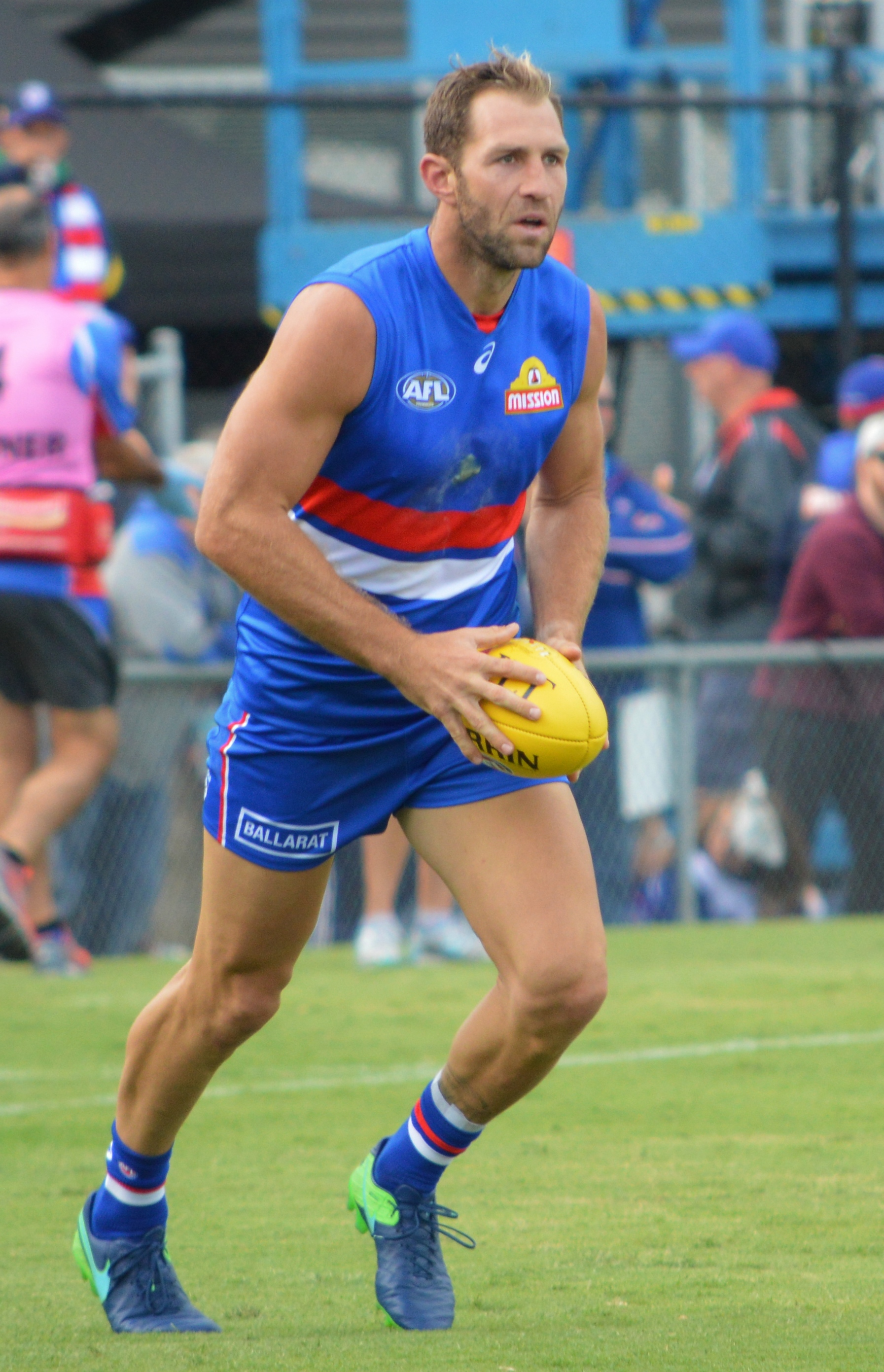
- Cloke playing with the Western Bulldogs in a pre-season match in February 2017

Personal information
- Full name: Travis Cloke
- Born: 5 March 1987 (age 39)
- Original team: Eastern Ranges (TAC Cup)
- Draft: Pick 39 (F/S), 2004 National Draft, Collingwood
- Height: 196 cm (6 ft 5 in)
- Weight: 108 kg (238 lb)
- Position: Key Forward

Playing career^{1}
Years	Club	Games (Goals)
2005–2016	Collingwood	246 (441)
2017	Western Bulldogs	10 (11)
Total		256 (452)
- ^{1} Playing statistics correct to the end of 2017.

Career highlights
- Collingwood premiership player 2010; 2x All-Australian team: 2011, 2013; Copeland Trophy: 2007; Neale Daniher Trophy: 2015; 4x Collingwood leading goalkicker 2011-2014; Harry Collier Trophy: 2005

Travis Cloke (born 5 March 1987) is a former professional Australian rules footballer who played for the Collingwood Football Club and Western Bulldogs in the Australian Football League (AFL).

Cloke was drafted under the father–son rule by Collingwood in the 3rd round (no.39 overall) of the 2004 AFL draft. He was the third and youngest son of David Cloke, who played 333 matches for Richmond and Collingwood between 1974 and 1991, joining older brothers Jason and Cameron. Travis was drafted as a key-position player at 195 cm, capable as a back-up ruckman.

Development Coach Essendon 2024-2025.

== AFL career ==
=== Collingwood ===
==== 2005 ====
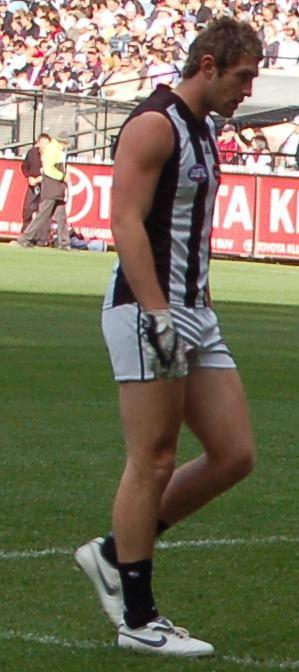
Cloke in 2007

In 2005, after injury setbacks to key big men Josh Fraser and Anthony Rocca, Cloke would make his debut in front of a 70,000 strong crowd on ANZAC Day against Essendon, where he would make an immediate impact at centre half-forward, having 16 disposals, 8 inside 50s and kicking a goal. He would continue to play good football as an 18-year-old, playing 14 of the next 15 games, before he was omitted before season's end. He earned an AFL Rising Star nomination in round 10 after several impressive weeks, following 16 touches and two goals against the West Coast Eagles with 15 touches, 6 marks, 4 tackles and a goal against Hawthorn. He managed an inaccurate 10.16 in his debut season, but many behinds coming from outside 50 metres, showing his penetrating left boot. Cloke also won Collingwood's Best First-Year Player Award.

==== 2006 ====
2006 would see Cloke have an inconsistent season, dropped once, and failing to make immediate returns after late withdrawals twice during the season, playing five games in the VFL and being named emergency three times including the qualifying final. He averaged just over 11 disposals a game and 5 marks, but only kicked 6.12 in 15 matches as a centre half-forward. He was played in the back half in a handful of matches, but was needed inside forward 50. He did however still send the ball inside 50 on numerous occasions, and showed good hands. His turnaround came in rounds 16–19, where he made a return from the reserves. He had 15 touches and 5 marks in defence against West Coast, before standing tall at centre half-forward the next week with a to date career high 22 touches and 12 marks, as well as two goals against Hawthorn. He averaged 17 disposals and 8 marks in the defining month of football.

==== 2007 ====
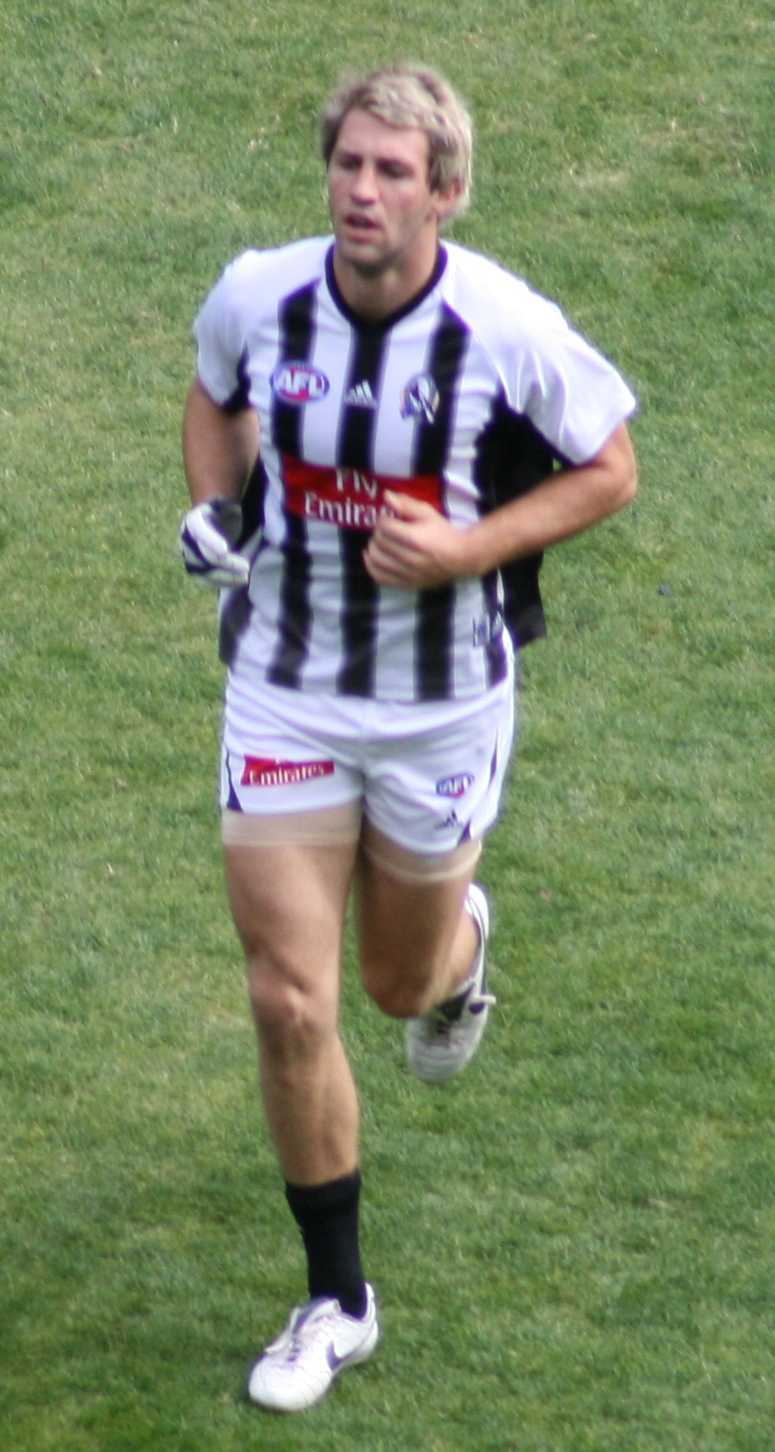
Cloke in 2008

After an inconsistent first two seasons, Cloke was poised to shrug off second-year blues, and did so with fine fashion in 2007. Cloke would start round one and steadily improve each game, starting at his preferred position, centre half-forward. He played consistent but not eye catching footy early on, before having a productive ANZAC Day match, with 24 disposals, 13 marks, 10 inside 50s and 4 score assists along with 1.3. He would then kick 9 goals in the next four matches, including 16 kicks, 11 marks and 3.4 against Carlton in Round 7. Despite accuracy concerns, which had been a concern since the start of his career, he kicked a goal in fourteen consecutive games, and his close to All-Australian form would progress in the second half of the season. He had 20 disposals, 10 marks and kicked 4 goals against premiers Geelong, followed up by 13 kicks, 11 marks and 3 goals against Essendon. He would prove vital in the finals, being the club's best player in September, which awarded him a surprise Copeland Trophy as the Collingwood best and fairest, just aged 20 years old. His finals campaign saw him average 18 disposals, 11 marks and kicking 7 goals in the three games. He played all 25 matches, leading the club in long kicks (122) and inside 50s (121, 3rd AFL), whilst taking 36 contested marks. His season would be defining, where he would become one of the best forwards in the league, named at #26 in Mike Sheahan's pre-season top 50 for 2008.

==== 2008 ====
Coming off the back of a best and fairest season, Cloke averaged two goals in his first six matches. When injury struck the Magpie camp, Cloke was forced to hold up the forward line with the opposition's tall defenders covering him for most of the season. On two occasions, Cloke kicked five majors (round six and round 21) highlighting the fact that with a supportive cast in the forward line, the centre-half forward is capable of being a key scoring threat. His best game was against Essendon on Anzac Day taking 14 marks and kicking five goals. The 21-year-old finished sixth in the Copeland Trophy.

==== 2013 ====
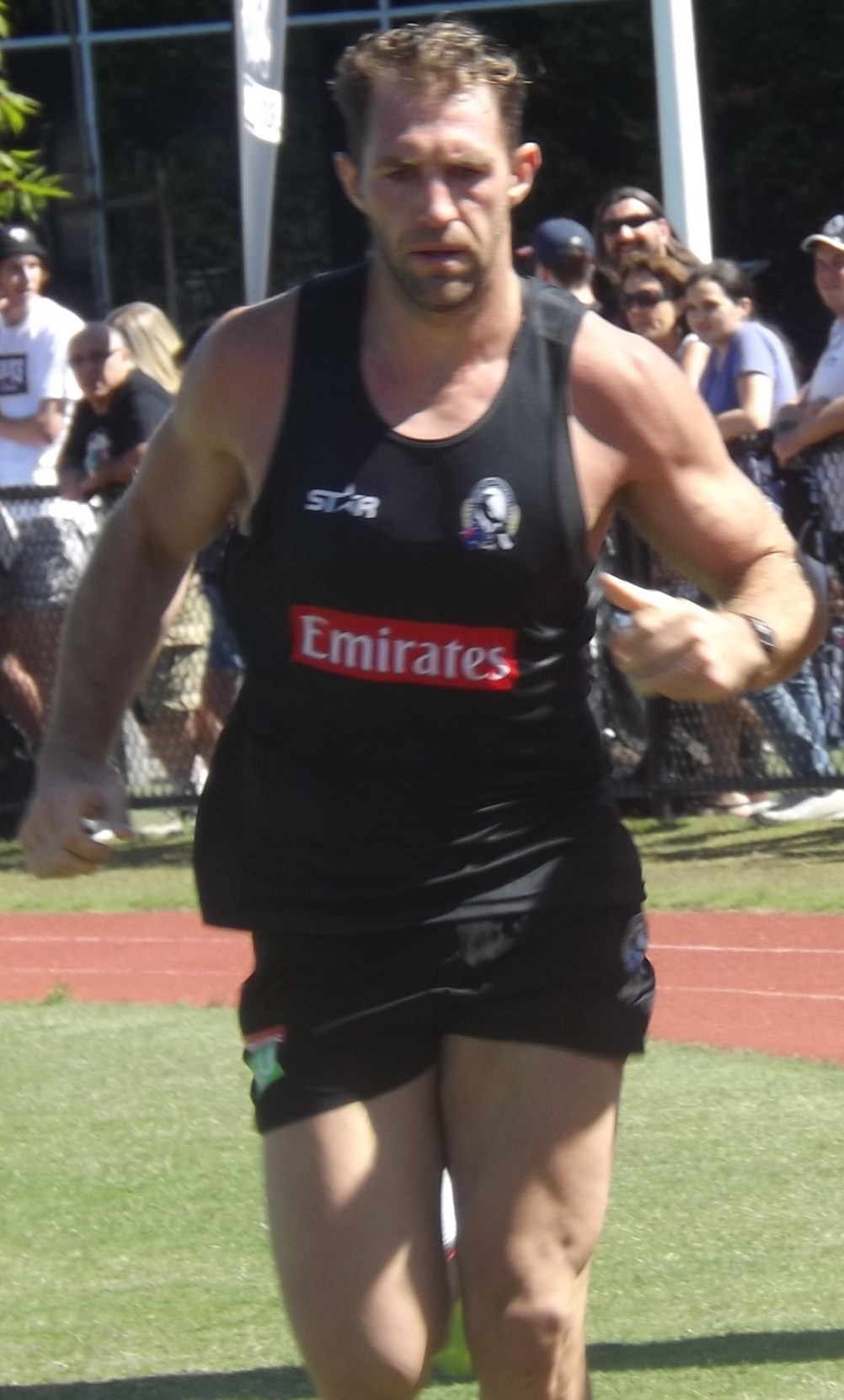
Cloke in 2014

After signing a 5-year, multimillion-dollar deal with magpies late in 2012, Cloke started the 2013 AFL season strongly, kicking 4 goals against North Melbourne in Round 1. This was followed by a dominant display in a Round 3 loss to Hawthorn, where he kicked 5 goals. Cloke then kicked a career high 7 goals against Richmond in a best on ground performance, despite dislocating his finger just a day before the game.

==== 2016 ====
Cloke failed to find form during the season managing only 13 senior games and was dropped to the reserves on three occasions where he played seven games. After a season filled with criticism, speculations were growing and finally in August, he requested a trade from Collingwood and he nominated the Western Bulldogs as his preferred destination. Cloke was traded to the Western Bulldogs in October 2016.

=== Western Bulldogs ===
==== 2017 ====
Cloke was a solid contributor for the Bulldogs in his first four games, but succumbed to injury and did not return until Round 9. He was dropped after his return game, and took leave from the game due to mental health issues. He returned late in the season but was again dropped after indifferent form. Cloke played 10 games and kicked 11 goals in what was overall a disappointing season, as the Bulldogs missed the finals after winning the premiership in the previous year. In late October, Cloke announced his retirement despite having a year left on his contract.

== Statistics ==
Legend
G	Goals	K	Kicks	D	Disposals	T	Tackles
B	Behinds	H	Handballs	M	Marks

Led the league after season and finals

Season	Team	No.	Games	Totals							Averages (per game)						
Season	Team	No.	Games	G	B	K	H	D	M	T	G	B	K	H	D	M	T
2005	Collingwood	32	15	10	16	118	30	148	53	17	0.7	1.1	7.9	2.0	9.9	3.5	1.1
2006	Collingwood	32	15	6	12	146	25	171	79	17	0.4	0.8	9.7	1.7	11.4	5.3	1.1
2007	Collingwood	32	25	39	39	294	68	362	186	50	1.6	1.6	11.8	2.7	14.5	7.4	2.0
2008	Collingwood	32	23	40	25	243	67	310	159	29	1.7	1.1	10.6	2.9	13.5	6.9	1.3
2009	Collingwood	32	22	22	26	251	79	330	155	55	1.0	1.2	11.4	3.6	15.0	7.0	2.5
2010	Collingwood	32	24	38	40	266	100	366	171	56	1.6	1.7	11.1	4.2	15.3	7.1	2.3
2011	Collingwood	32	25	69	48	315	76	391	192	70	2.8	1.9	12.6	3.0	15.6	7.7	2.8
2012	Collingwood	32	25	59	34	259	71	330	157	43	2.4	1.4	10.4	2.8	13.2	6.3	1.7
2013	Collingwood	32	22	68	51	258	65	323	190	29	3.1	2.3	11.7	3.0	14.7	8.6	1.3
2014	Collingwood	32	20	39	30	187	58	245	137	34	2.0	1.5	9.4	2.9	12.3	6.9	1.7
2015	Collingwood	32	17	34	23	167	48	215	112	23	2.0	1.4	9.8	2.8	12.6	6.6	1.4
2016	Collingwood	32	13	17	16	139	25	164	87	29	1.3	1.2	10.7	1.9	12.6	6.7	2.2
2017	Western Bulldogs	13	10	11	9	82	39	121	41	22	1.1	0.9	8.2	3.9	12.1	4.1	2.2
Career			256	452	369	2725	751	3476	1719	474	1.8	1.4	10.6	2.9	13.6	6.7	1.9

== Honours and achievements ==
Brownlow Medal votes
Season	Votes
2005	—
2006	1
2007	3
2008	5
2009	2
2010	2
2011	13
2012	7
2013	6
2014	4
2015	4
Total	47

- Team
  - AFL Premiership (Collingwood): 2010
  - McClelland Trophy (Collingwood): 2010, 2011
  - NAB Cup (Collingwood): 2011
  - Robert Rose Cup: 2009–2013
- Individual
  - All-Australian: 2011, 2013
  - Copeland Trophy (Collingwood Best and Fairest): 2007
  - Collingwood F.C. Leading Club Goalkicker Award: 2011 (69), 2012 (59), 2013 (68), 2014 (39)
  - Harry Collier Trophy – Best First Year Player (Collingwood F.C.): 2005
  - AFL Rising Star Nominee: 2005 (Round 10)

== Off-field altercations ==
While celebrating New Year's Eve in 2008 with some friends, Cloke was hurt in a confrontation with several men while on holidays in a Maroochydore holiday unit above them, after asking them to make less noise.

In mid-2009, Cloke's residence was shot at in the early hours of the morning.

== Personal life ==
Travis Cloke married his wife Rebeccah (née Panozza) in December 2016. The Clokes announced in May 2017 that they were expecting their first child in late October.

== Family relations ==
Travis is the son of Collingwood and Richmond footballer David, who played VFL football from 1974 to 1991, for a total of 333 matches. Travis played alongside his two older brothers Jason and Cameron, until the end of the 2006 season where his two brothers were delisted. Cameron however was picked up in the AFL Pre-Season Draft by Carlton, while Jason has been a success for Bendigo and Williamstown in the VFL. In 2010 Cameron moved to Port Adelaide but played only one match before being delisted the same year.

== See also ==
- List of Australian rules football families
