= David Cloke =

Australian rules footballer, born 1955

Personal information
- Born: 28 January 1955 (age 71); Victoria
- Original team: Oakleigh Juniors
- Debut: 1974, Richmond vs. Fitzroy, at Junction Oval
- Height: 196 cm (6 ft 5 in)
- Weight: 106 kg (234 lb)
- Position: Ruckman/Tall forward

Playing career^{1}
Years	Club	Games (Goals)
1974–1982	Richmond	176 (261)
1983–1989	Collingwood	114 (51)
1990–1991	Richmond	43 (11)
Total		333 (323)
- ^{1} Playing statistics correct to the end of 1991.

Career highlights
- VFL Premiership player: (1974, 1980); Richmond captain: (1982); Ainslie Premiership Captain, 1992, 1993; Alex Jesaulenko Trophy; All-Australian team: (1979); Richmond – Hall of Fame – inducted 2007

David Cloke (born 28 January 1955) is a former Australian rules footballer who played for the Richmond Football Club and the Collingwood Football Club in the Australian Football League (AFL).

A tough and skilled footballer with an imposing physique and trademark moustache, Cloke spent most of his career either in the ruck or as a key forward. His three sons also played football at AFL level.

== VFL/AFL Career ==
Cloke began his senior football career with VFA club Oakleigh where he played alongside his brother Peter, and in 1974 he went to Richmond. Cloke was a premiership player in his debut season with the Tigers and went on to play 219 VFL games from 1974 to 1982 (including another winning Grand Final in 1980) and in 1990–1991. In between, he played with Collingwood, where he added another 114 league games.

Cloke kicked a total of 323 goals during his eighteen-season AFL career, before retiring in 1991. Cloke came second in the Brownlow Medal in 1984, 3 votes behind winner Peter Moore. He achieved All Australian selection after representing Victoria at the Perth State of Origin Carnival of 1979.

== Post-AFL Career ==
In 1992, post his VFL/AFL career, he joined Ainslie Football Club in the ACT as captain-coach, and guided them to a flag, a success repeated the following year when he won the Alex Jesaulenko Trophy for best afield in the grand final. Cloke's only club best and fairest award came in 1992 with Ainslie. He did, however, achieve All Australian selection after representing Victoria at the 1979 Perth State of Origin Carnival. He joined Victorian Football Association club Port Melbourne as non-playing coach in 1994, although did come out of retirement to play a handful of games during the season due to his team's long injury list.

David was inducted into Richmond's Hall of Fame in 2007.

== Family ==
David's three sons, Jason, Cameron and Travis were all originally recruited in the AFL for Collingwood. However, Jason has since been cut by the club before returning to play for Collingwood's VFL side, Williamstown and Cameron was recruited by Carlton in 2006 and then joined Port Adelaide for one season in 2010.

Cloke is married to Julie and they have five adult children, Jason, Cameron, Travis, Jodie and Teigan.

== Bibliography ==
- Hogan P: The Tigers Of Old, Richmond FC, Melbourne 1996
