= Michael Woolnough =

Australian rules footballer

Personal information
- Full name: Michael Woolnough
- Born: 24 September 1952 (age 74)
- Original team: St Joseph's
- Height: 185 cm (6 ft 1 in)
- Weight: 81 kg (179 lb)
- Position: Wingman

Playing career^{1}
Years	Club	Games (Goals)
1971–78	Geelong	117 (42)
1979–80	Collingwood	24 (8)
Total		141 (50)
- ^{1} Playing statistics correct to the end of 1980.

Michael Woolnough (born 24 September 1952) is a former Australian rules footballer who played with Geelong and Collingwood in the Victorian Football League (VFL) during the 1970s.

Woolnough, a wingman, was recruited to Geelong from Geelong Football League (GFL) club St Joseph's. In 1972 and 1973, his appearances were limited by knee and hamstring problems but he was a regular from 1974. He transferred to Collingwood in 1979 and played his last league game in their 1980 VFL Grand Final loss, which he started on the interchange bench.

Mike played junior football in the North Shore Football Club's Little League, winning the inaugural best and fairest in 1963 and winning it again in 1965.

These days Mike resides on the Gold Coast, Queensland.

He has a son, Marc, who played briefly at Geelong in 1998 and 2002.
