= Rod Oborne =

Australian rules footballer and coach

Personal information
- Full name: Rodney Charles Oborne
- Born: 6 September 1953 (age 73); Devonport, Tasmania
- Original teams: Marist Brothers College, Burnie (Tas)
- Height: 183 cm (6 ft 0 in)
- Weight: 76 kg (168 lb)

Playing career^{1}
Years	Club	Games (Goals)
1972–1979	Collingwood	87 (85)
1979–1981	Richmond	5 (7)
Total		92 (92)
- ^{1} Playing statistics correct to the end of 1981.

Rodney Charles Oborne (born 6 September 1953) is a former Australian rules footballer who played with Collingwood and Richmond in the Victorian Football League (VFL).

Oborne, a left-footed half forward flanker, was recruited from Marist Brothers College, in Burnie, Tasmania. Making his senior debut in the 1972 VFL season, Oborne kicked 39 goals in 1973, the second most for his club behind Peter McKenna, and was also the only Collingwood player to appear in all 24 games. He continued to be regularly selected in the team until the 1975 VFL season, when injuries restricted him to just three games.

He spent the 1977 season in the West Australian National Football League (WANFL), playing for Claremont, having been involved in a trade which saw Claremont star Kevin Worthington arrive at Collingwood.

In 1978, Oborne returned to Collingwood and played in his third VFL preliminary final. He again finished in the losing team and never got to appear in a grand final for Collingwood. During the 1979 VFL season, Oborne transferred to Richmond and kicked four goals in his first game for his new club, against Melbourne at the Melbourne Cricket Ground (MCG). He only played four more games for Richmond, in three seasons and missed out on their 1980 premiership.

For the rest of the 1980s, Oborne was a coach, starting as playing coach at Victorian Football Association (VFA) club Williamstown in 1982. In 1984, he was appointed coach of Ainslie in Canberra's ACTFL. He steered them to the 1984 premiership.

He has a son, Brad Oborne, who also played for Collingwood.
