= Father–son rule =

Australian football rule allowing preferential recruiting access

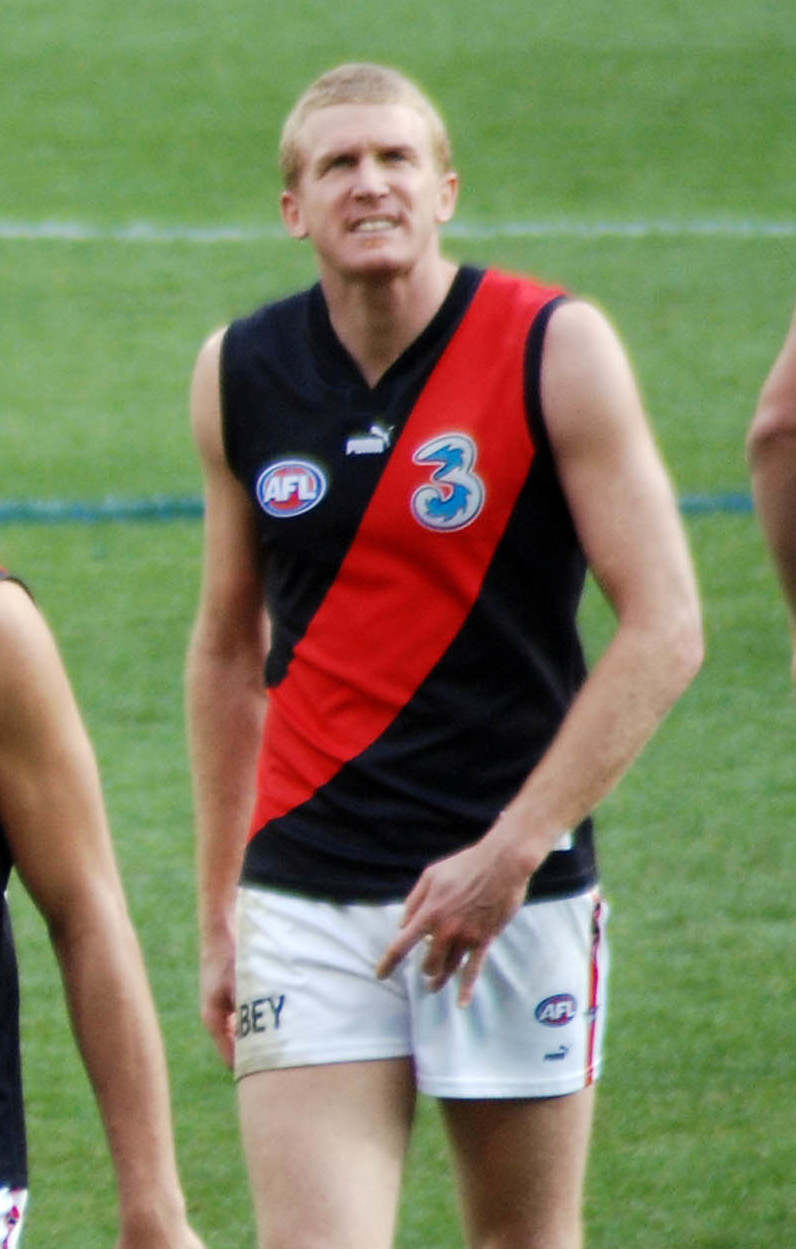
Dustin Fletcher, the son of Ken Fletcher, has played the most games of any father–son selection, with 400 AFL matches played

The father–son rule is a rule that allows clubs preferential recruiting access to the sons of players who have made a major past contribution to the club in Australian rules football, most notably in the Australian Football League.

The rule was first established in 1949, and there have been more than ten amendments, most recently the refining of the draft bidding process in 2015.

== History ==
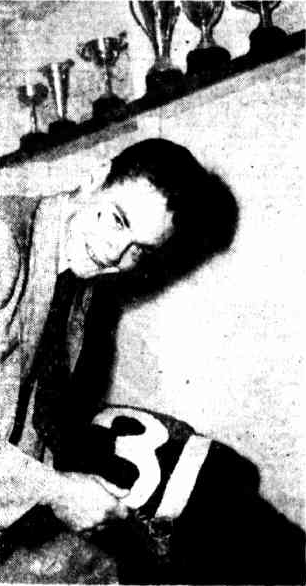
Ron Barassi in 1953 with his father's trophies and guernsey. Barassi was zoned to either Carlton or Collingwood; however, Melbourne went to the VFL and successfully lobbied for the creation of the father–son rule to allow clubs preferential recruiting access to the sons of players who have made a major past contribution to the team, a move which allowed Barassi to play for them.

The father–son rule was established during the 1949 season, allowing a player to be recruited by the club his father had played for, despite being residentially zoned to another club. The first player officially cleared under the father–son rule was Harvey Dunn Jr, who was recruited to his father's old club, Carlton, in 1951, instead of being zoned to North Melbourne.

The original rule is thought to have originally come into place as a result of successful lobbying by the Melbourne Football Club, which had wanted the young Ron Barassi to follow in the footsteps of his father, Ron Barassi Sr., who had been killed in action at Tobruk during World War II. Barassi was officially cleared to Melbourne under the rule in 1953.

=== Incorporation into the VFL/AFL draft ===
When the VFL/AFL draft was established and residential zoning was abolished, the rule initially allowed the son to be recruited by his father's club, bypassing the draft entirely. West Coast's Ben Cousins, for example, was recruited in this manner, without the Eagles parting with any draft picks. However, by the late 1990s, the draft was becoming established as the predominant and most important means of player recruitment, and as a key equalisation measure to maintain competitive balance among the clubs. As such, the rules were first altered in 1997 to ensure clubs could still have preferential access to sons, but would be required to spend draft picks on the recruitment. This has undergone several changes as the league has sought to find the fairest balance for the draft cost:

- In 1997, a father-son recruitment would cost the club's second-round draft pick; and a second father-son recruitment in the same year would cost its third round selection. Geelong used this rule in 1997 to draft Marc Woolnough with their second selection and Matthew Scarlett with their third-round pick, whilst Collingwood chose to not select Marcus Picken.
- In 2001, the rule was changed to only allow a single selection per year, costing the club a third-round selection. Notably, Geelong used this rule to draft Gary Ablett Jr., who, while rated only a mid-range draft prospect at the time, went on to win two Brownlow Medals.
- In 2003, the allowance to recruit a second father-son in the same year was reintroduced, the first costing a third-round selection and the second costing a second-round selection. Collingwood drafted cousins Brayden and Heath Shaw using their second- and third-round selection, respectively, in 2003.

In 2007, following concerns that potential first-round draftees were being selected for unfairly low draft picks, a bidding system was established. Under this 2007 amendment, any club could bid on another club's son with one of its draft picks, and the father's club then had the right to recruit the son by giving up its next pick. The bidding process occurred prior to the draft, but the decisions made while bidding were binding during the draft. For example, in 2008 the Western Bulldogs used a first-round selection to secure Ayce Cordy after St Kilda bid a higher first-round selection for him.

The bidding system was further refined in 2015. Under this system:

- Each draft pick is assigned a value (with No. 1 starting at 3000 points, declining exponentially until eventually the picks have no value), which is regressed from historical player salary data.
- During the draft, any club may select a father–son eligible player with any draft pick.
- The father's club, if it wishes to select the son, must then use its next one or more draft picks until the total points value of the surrendered picks adds up to the value of the draft pick used by the bidding, adjusted by a discount. Any points left over after reaching the bid value result in the partially-spent draft pick being shuffled down the order based on its remaining points.
- The club which originally made the bid then has the next selection in the draft.

When initially established, the discount on bid points was either 20% of the bid value or 197 points (equivalent to pick No. 56 at the time), whichever is greater. This was reduced to a 10% discount in 2025; and then changed again in 2026 to a levy and discount based on finishing positions, with non-finalists still receiving a 10% discount, grand finalists having a 20% levy added to the bid value, and a sliding scale in between. The 2026 amendments also newly required that a maximum of two picks be used to meet a bid, eliminating a practice under which clubs could use four or five low- to mid-range draft picks to meet the bid for a top draft prospect; and granted a compensatory second-round draft pick to any club with a bid matched on a top-five pick.

The same bidding process applied to father-son selections is also used to allow clubs preferential access to players in their club academies – either the New South Wales and Queensland clubs' state academies, or any club's Next Generation Academy.

== Player eligibility ==
As of March 2011, eligibility of players differs depending upon the home-state of the team making the selection.

=== All clubs ===
A player is eligible if his father played 100 or more senior games for the clubs. In the cases of the two interstate clubs with historic links to Victorian Football League teams, namely the Brisbane Lions and the Sydney Swans, the sons of players who appeared 100 times for their Victorian predecessors: the Fitzroy Lions in the case of the Brisbane Lions; and the South Melbourne Football Club in the case of the Sydney Swans.

=== West Australian and South Australian teams ===
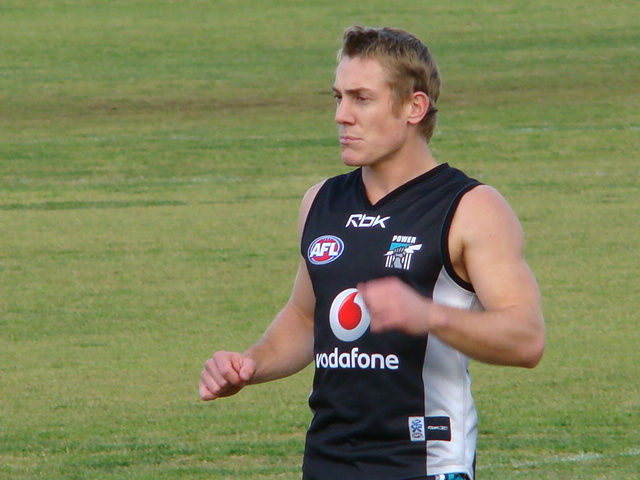
Brett Ebert was eligible to be selected as a father–son selection by Port Adelaide, as his father, Russell Ebert, played over 200 games for Port Adelaide in the SANFL

In addition to the standard eligibility rules, the South Australian and Western Australian clubs have a modified rule in place with eligibility to be determined by a certain number of games played for specific sides in SANFL or WAFL, if those games were played prior to the club entering the AFL. Specifically:

- The West Coast Eagles could select any player whose father had made 150 WAFL appearances prior to 1987 for Claremont, East Perth, West Perth or Subiaco.
- Adelaide could select any player whose father made 200 SANFL appearances prior to 1991 for South Adelaide, Norwood, Glenelg or Sturt.
- Fremantle could select any player whose father has made 150 WAFL appearances prior to 1995 for East Fremantle, South Fremantle, Perth or Swan Districts.
- Port Adelaide can select any player whose father has made 200 SANFL appearances prior to 1997 for the Port Adelaide Magpies, North Adelaide, West Adelaide, Central District, Woodville or West Torrens.

Until 2006 these rules were intended to apply only during the first 20 years of the club's existence in the AFL, but this was later removed because it was felt to be unfair if a player had a son later in life.

These rules were criticised by non-Victorian AFL club officials as a "grandfather–son" rule that ultimately failed to provide them with equitable father–son opportunities to the Victorian clubs; and, in fact, Adelaide did not make a single father–son recruitment until 2016. Club changes, time restrictions, and periods of time spent playing in Victoria ultimately affected the number of sons who met the eligibility criteria; for example, Adelaide missed out on preferential access to 2006 No. 1 draft pick Bryce Gibbs despite his father Ross Gibbs's 253-game career with SANFL club Glenelg from 1984 to 1994, as Ross had only played 191 of the required 200 games before Adelaide began AFL play in 1991.

=== Former eligibility rules ===
Under previous rules, the sons of a senior administrator, such as a president, vice-president, general manager or senior coach, with a tenure of at least five years at a club, would be eligible to be drafted under the father–son rule by that club; and Brisbane Lions and Sydney were previously able to recruit players whose fathers had met eligibility criteria in the Queensland Australian Football League and the Sydney Football League, respectively. Neither of these rules is in place as of 2012.

=== More than one eligible team and player choice ===
If a player is eligible to be selected by more than one team, the individual player may choose which one of these teams is able to pick him under this rule. For example, Joe Daniher's father, Anthony Daniher, played 118 games with Essendon and 115 with Sydney. Joe selected Essendon.

Alternatively, a player has the right to decline to be selected under the father–son rule and instead be eligible to be drafted by any other club, although instances of this are rare. A prominent example was Marc Murphy, who declined to sign with the Brisbane Lions despite his father, John Murphy, playing 214 games for the Fitzroy Football Club. Murphy was instead selected as the first pick in the 2005 National Draft by Carlton.

== AFL Women's ==
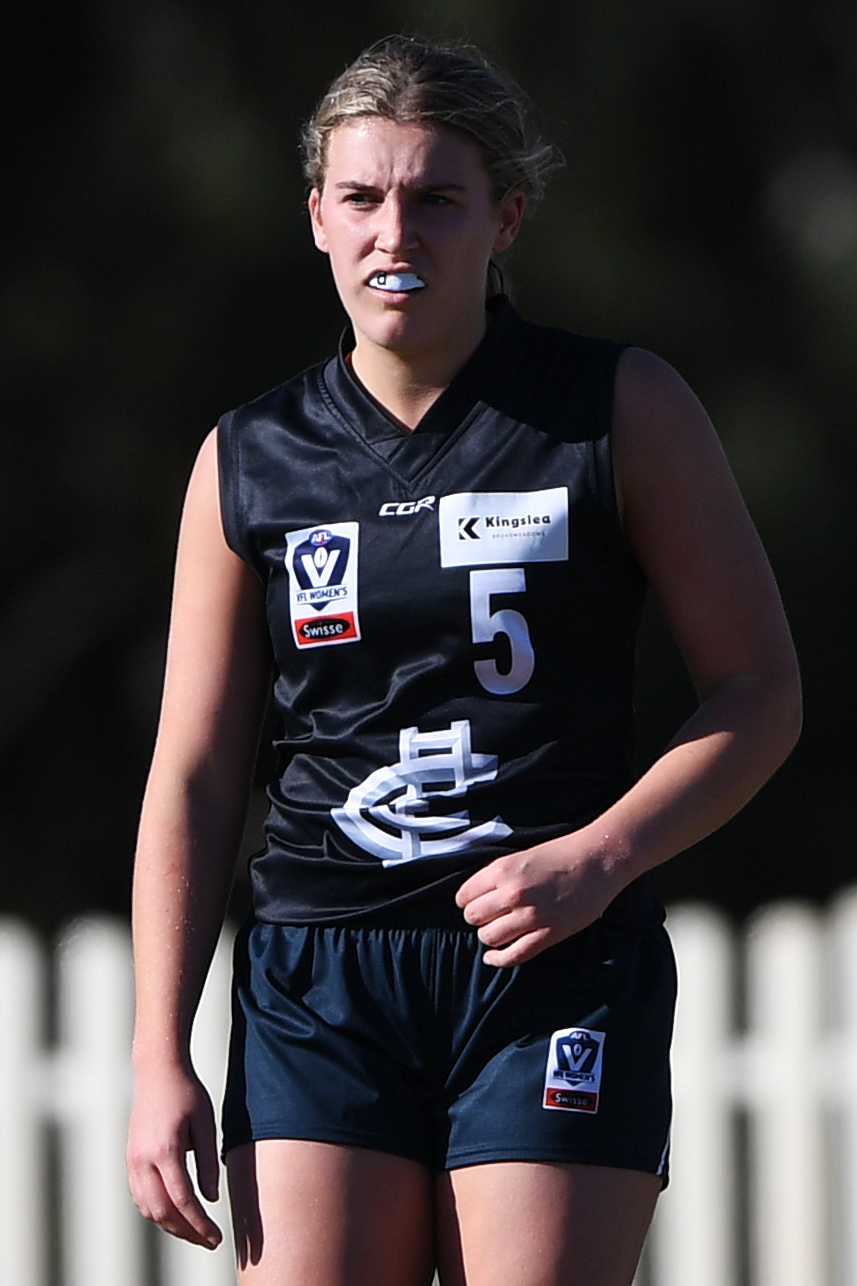
Abbie McKay, the daughter of Andrew McKay, was the first player to be selected under the father–daughter rule

With the establishment of AFL Women's from the 2017 season, the AFL introduced an equivalent father–daughter recruitment rule, enabling clubs priority recruitment access to daughters of former senior players. Initially under this rule, the father needed to only have played one senior match for his club for his daughter to be eligible; in October 2026 it was announced that this would increase to 100 games from 2028, to align with the father-son rule.

The first father–daughter selection was in 2018, when Carlton selected Abbie McKay, the daughter of Andrew McKay.

A mother–son and mother–daughter rule have been discussed, but to date have not been created.

== See also ==
- List of players drafted to the Australian Football League under the father–son rule
- AFL draft
