= 1995 Carlton Football Club season =

Carlton Football Club
1995 season
- President: John Elliott
- Coach: David Parkin
- Captain: Stephen Kernahan
- Home ground: Princes Park
- Ansett Australia Cup: Quarter-finals
- AFL season: 1st (20–2)
- Finals series: Premiers
- Robert Reynolds Trophy: Brett Ratten
- Leading goalkicker: Stephen Kernahan (63)

The 1995 Carlton Football Club season was the Carlton Football Club's 132nd season of competition, and 99th as a member of the Australian Football League.

Carlton won the AFL premiership, defeating Geelong in the grand final. It was the club's sixteenth and, as of 2024, most recent premiership. It was a record-breaking season for the club, in which it set a new record by winning twenty matches during the premiership season.

The club also fielded its reserves team in the Victorian State Football League.

== Club summary ==
The 1995 AFL season was the 99th season of the AFL competition since its inception in 1897; and, having competed in every season, it was also the 99th season contested by the Carlton Football Club. As it had been since 1897, the club's home ground was Optus Oval (known historically as Princes Park) in North Carlton. In addition to contesting the VFL premiership, the Carlton senior team contested the 1995 Ansett Australia Cup, which ran during the pre-season. Carlton also fielded a team in the AFL reserves competition (which was administered at this time by the Victorian State Football League).

Carlton's key senior personnel were all unchanged from 1994: John Elliott as club president, David Parkin as senior coach, and Stephen Kernahan as captain. Parkin had been under pressure to keep his job following the club's early exit from the 1994 finals series, and he was signed to a one-year contract for the 1995 season.

== Squad and player statistics for 1995 ==
The following are the senior and supplementary squads for the 1995 season. Numbers in parentheses represent senior games played and goals kicked for Carlton in the 1995 AFL premiership season.

Carlton Football Club
Senior list		Supplementaries	Coaching staff
1 Stephen Silvagni (24,7); 2 Greg Williams (17,29); 3 Stephen Oliver (0,0); 4 Stephen Kernahan (17,63) (c); 5 Andrew McKay (25,1); 6 Matt Clape (23,31); 7 Brett Ratten (25,12); 8 Troy Bond (15,1); 10 Barry Mitchell (13,6); 11 Earl Spalding (25,34); 12 Adrian Gleeson (9,7); 13 Mil Hanna (21,14); 14 Michael Sexton (25,3); 15 Tony Lynn (6,3); 16 Scott Camporeale (24,11); 17 Brent Heaver (5,6); 18 James Cook (7,8); 19 Brad Pearce (23,52); 20 Fraser Brown (18,13); 21 Craig Bradley (25,12); 22 Glenn Manton (12,2)	23 Dean Rice (18,21); 24 Matthew Allan (10,6); 26 Ben Harrison (2,0); 27 Luke O'Sullivan (6,6); 28 Peter Turner (0,0); 29 Simon Beaumont (2,1); 30 Alan Thorpe (0,0); 31 Matthew Blagrove (0,0); 32 Adrian Whitehead (25,4); 33 Matthew Hogg (4,0); 34 Ron de Iulio (2,0); 35 Peter Dean (22,6); 36 Aaron Hamill (0,0); 37 David Nicholson (0,0); 38 Rohan Welsh (0,0); 39 Ang Christou (25,6); 40 Tony Bourke (0,0); 41 Mark Cullen (0,0); 42 Adam White (0,0); 43 Anthony Koutoufides (25,22); 44 Justin Madden (25,5)	45 Denver Artz; 46 Ben Jordan; 47 Kristian Pascoe; 48 Stephen Sexton; 49 Shane Snibson; 50 Nick Wal; 51 Richard Stubbs; 52 Ross McInerney	Head coach: David Parkin; Assistant coaches: Ken Judge (assistant); Col Kinnear (football manager); Legend: (c) Captain(s); (vc) Vice-captain(s); Updated: Source(s):

== Playing list changes ==
The following summarises player transfers to and from the club between the conclusion of the 1994 season and the conclusion of the 1995 season.

=== In ===
Player	Previous club	League	Comments
(Victoria (state)) Matthew Blagrove	Carlton reserves	VSFL	Pre-draft supplementary selection
(South Australia) Scott Camporeale	Woodville-West Torrens	SANFL	1994 National Draft, selection No. 15
(Victoria (state)) Mark Cullen	Eastern Ranges	VSFL U18s	1994 National Draft, selection No. 33
(Victoria (state)) Adam White	Eastern Ranges	VSFL U18s	1994 National Draft, selection No. 41
(Victoria (state)) Tony Bourke	Ballarat Rebels	VSFL U18s	1994 National Draft, selection No. 67
Aaron Hamill	Tuggeranong	ACTFL	1994 National Draft, selection No. 79
(Victoria (state)) David Nicholson	Western Jets	VSFL U18s	1994 National Draft, selection No. 89
(Western Australia) Matt Clape	West Coast	AFL	1995 Preseason Draft, selection No. 13
(Victoria (state)) Glenn Manton	Essendon	AFL	1995 Preseason Draft, selection No. 27
(Victoria (state)) Alan Thorpe	Footscray	AFL	1995 Preseason Draft, selection No. 36

=== Out ===
Player	New club	League	Comments
(Victoria (state)) Tom Alvin	Sandringham	VFA
(Victoria (state)) Mark Athorn
(Victoria (state)) Andrew Cavedon	Fitzroy	AFL
(New South Wales) Peter Green
(South Australia) David Kernahan
(Victoria (state)) Paul McCormack	Norwood	SANFL
(New South Wales) Tim Powell
(Victoria (state)) Ben Robertson	North Adelaide	SANFL
(Victoria (state)) Brett Sholl
(Tasmania) Jeremy Smith

== Season summary ==
=== Pre-season matches ===
Big Three Challenge Cup

Carlton's first competitive pre-season event for the season was the once-off 'Big Three Challenge Cup', a one-day lightning tournament held amongst the so-called 'Big Three' Victorian clubs: Carlton, Collingwood and Essendon. The event was held on Sunday 19 February at Waverley Park, with three half-length matches played. Collingwood won the event, winning both of its games; Carlton finished second.

**Date and local time**	**Opponent**	**Scores** (Carlton's scores indicated in **bold**)			**Venue**	**Attendance**
**Date and local time**	**Opponent**	Home	Away	Result	**Venue**	**Attendance**
Sunday, 19 February (12:30 pm)	Collingwood	**3.4 (22)**	11.3 (69)	Lost by 47 points	Waverley Park	
Sunday, 19 February (2:00 pm)	Essendon	**6.11 (47)**	4.9 (33)	Won by 16 points	Waverley Park	

Ansett Australia Cup

Carlton played two matches in the 1995 Ansett Australia Cup pre-season competition, before being eliminated by St Kilda in the quarter-finals.

**Round**	**Date**	**Opponent**	**Scores** (Carlton's scores indicated in **bold**)			**Venue**	**Attendance**
**Round**	**Date**	**Opponent**	Home	Away	Result	**Venue**	**Attendance**
Rd of 16	Saturday, 25 February (night)	Richmond	**20.9 (129)**	13.9 (87)	Won by 42 points	Waverley Park	23,678
QF	Monday, 6 March (night)	St Kilda	**12.10 (82)**	12.11 (83)	Lost by 1 point	Waverley Park	12,476

Other pre-season matches

Carlton played two other pre-season practice matches against other clubs before the 1995 season.

**Date**	**Opponent**	**Scores** (Carlton's scores indicated in **bold**)			**Venue**	**Attendance**
**Date**	**Opponent**	Home	Away	Result	**Venue**	**Attendance**
Saturday, 11 February	Brisbane Bears	7.15 (57)	**11.11 (77)**	Won by 20 points	Coolum	
Saturday, 18 March (night)	Essendon	**8.7 (55)**	16.7 (103)	Lost by 48 points	Lavington Sports Ground	20,169

=== Home-and-away season ===
Carlton opened the home-and-away season strongly, winning its first seven games to move to the top of the ladder. However, the club's premiership favouritism was dented by two huge, unexpected losses suffered back-to-back in Rounds 8 and 9: against 11th placed Sydney by 72 points, and against last-placed St Kilda by 56 points. In the latter of those matches, St Kilda held Carlton goalless until the 18th minute of the third quarter. Following the losses, Parkin commented that the team had "gone from the best team in the competition to the worst team in two weeks". Carlton dropped to fourth on the ladder after Round 9.

The club returned to form the following week, defeating 10th placed Hawthorn by 102 points, and did not lose another game for the season. The club clinched the minor premiership in Round 19, and went on to finish four games clear of second-placed Geelong at the top of the ladder.

Carlton's performance through the season exceeded the expectations of most sportswriters. The club had won the minor premiership in 1993 and finished second after the home-and-away season in 1994, but had failed in the finals in both years. The club's star players were all aging – its key position players and leading midfielders, Bradley, Dean, Kernahan, Madden, Spalding and Williams were all older than 30 at the start of the season – and most had expected Carlton's form to drop away. However, the club's performance received a boost from breakout seasons from five of Carlton's developing players: Brown, Christou, Koutoufides, Ratten and Sexton – as well as a strong performance from rookie Scott Camporeale. Additionally, there was no drop-off in form from the club's older stars, with Bradley in particular in career-best form, winning many media awards for his play during the year. Breakout seasons by forward pocket Brad Pearce and pre-season draftee Matt Clape also provided good alternative options in the forward line. The club also notably adopted a then-novel leadership structure which offered the playing group additional autonomy and accountability, allowing the group to set its own goals and propose some of its own tactical changes; Parkin described it as the "least-coached team" he had been involved with in his 34 years of playing and coaching.

**Round**	**Date and local time**	**Opponent**	**Scores** (Carlton's scores indicated in **bold**)			**Venue**	**Attendance**	**Ladder** **position**
**Round**	**Date and local time**	**Opponent**	Home	Away	Result	**Venue**	**Attendance**	**Ladder** **position**
1	Sunday, 2 April (2:10 pm)	Collingwood	**14.11 (95)**	9.12 (66)	Won by 29 points	Melbourne Cricket Ground (H)	86,119	4th
2	Saturday, 8 April (2:10 pm)	Fitzroy	**18.17 (125)**	8.8 (56)	Won by 69 points	Optus Oval (H)	16,629	1st
3	Saturday, 15 April (2:10 pm)	Footscray	8.12 (60)	**23.20 (158)**	Won by 98 points	Melbourne Cricket Ground (A)	41,576	1st
4	Sunday, 23 April (1:15 pm)	Brisbane Bears	12.10 (82)	**18.11 (119)**	Won by 37 points	Gabba (A)	12,009	1st
5	Sunday, 30 April (2:10 pm)	North Melbourne	7.8 (50)	**12.12 (84)**	Won by 34 points	Melbourne Cricket Ground (A)	42,729	1st
6	Saturday, 6 May (2:10 pm)	West Coast	**13.12 (90)**	10.7 (67)	Won by 23 points	Optus Oval	24,171	1st
7	Saturday, 13 May (2:10 pm)	Essendon	**10.15 (75)**	9.13 (67)	Won by 8 points	Melbourne Cricket Ground (H)	73,753	1st
8	Friday, 19 May (7:40 pm)	Sydney	21.6 (132)	**8.12 (60)**	Lost by 72 points	Sydney Cricket Ground (A)	23,744	2nd
9	Saturday, 27 May (2:10 pm)	St Kilda	11.14 (80)	**3.6 (24)**	Lost by 56 points	Waverley Park (A)	17,902	4th
10	Sunday, 4 June (2:10 pm)	Hawthorn	**26.16 (172)**	10.10 (70)	Won by 102 points	Optus Oval (H)	29,520	3rd
11	Monday, 12 June (2:10 pm)	Melbourne	12.8 (80)	**16.16 (112)**	Won by 32 points	Melbourne Cricket Ground (A)	53,290	3rd
12	Saturday, 24 June (2:10 pm)	Geelong	**16.16 (112)**	15.19 (109)	Won by 3 points	Optus Oval (H)	32,368	2nd
13	Sunday, 2 July (4:15 pm)	Fremantle	7.7 (49)	**15.16 (106)**	Won by 57 points	Subiaco Oval (A)	25,067	2nd
14	Sunday, 9 July (2:10 pm)	Richmond	**17.13 (115)**	12.13 (85)	Won by 30 points	Melbourne Cricket Ground (H)	84,745	1st
15	Saturday, 15 July (2:10 pm)	Adelaide	**20.13 (133)**	15.10 (100)	Won by 33 points	Optus Oval (H)	22,502	1st
16	Sunday, 23 July (2:10 pm)	Collingwood	10.8 (68)	**12.18 (90)**	Won by 22 points	Melbourne Cricket Ground (A)	78,934	1st
17	Sunday, 30 July (2:10 pm)	Fitzroy	9.10 (64)	**24.17 (161)**	Won by 97 points	Waverley Park (A)	15,567	1st
18	Sunday, 6 August (2:10 pm)	Footscray	**15.16 (106)**	11.15 (81)	Won by 25 points	Optus Oval (H)	24,206	1st
19	Sunday, 13 August (2:10 pm)	Brisbane Bears	**11.19 (85)**	10.11 (71)	Won by 14 points	Optus Oval (H)	18,407	1st
20	Saturday, 19 August (2:10 pm)	North Melbourne	**18.14 (122)**	15.13 (103)	Won by 19 points	Optus Oval (H)	32,065	1st
21	Sunday, 27 August (4:15 pm)	West Coast	16.8 (104)	**15.15 (105)**	Won by 1 point	Subiaco Oval (A)	41,492	1st
22	Saturday, 2 September (2:10 pm)	Essendon	9.13 (67)	**16.11 (107)**	Won by 41 points	Melbourne Cricket Ground (A)	87,984	1st

Match notes

- The Round 3 match against Footscray was transferred from the Western Oval to the Melbourne Cricket Ground.
- The Round 5 match against North Melbourne was played after heavy rain which left sheets of stagnant water centimetres deep on the Melbourne Cricket Ground surface.
- The Round 14 match against Richmond was transferred from Optus Oval on Saturday 8 July to the Melbourne Cricket Ground on Sunday 9 July, due to the large crowd expected between the two teams who were at the top of the ladder.

=== Finals series ===
Despite finishing four games clear atop the ladder, and entering the finals with a 13-game winning streak, Carlton was not a rampant favourite to win the premiership. Over the previous two seasons, the club had developed a reputation as finals chokers: in 1993, it had been favourite to win the grand final, but lost by 44 points against a young Essendon team; then in 1994, it finished second on the ladder, then lost to seventh-placed Melbourne by 27 points and to an injury-depleted Geelong by 33 points to be eliminated in fifth place.

In the qualifying final, Carlton faced eighth-placed Brisbane Bears. Brisbane had been 14th on the ladder after round 15, before winning six of its last seven matches reach its first ever finals series, so it was one of the form teams of the competition. The game was closely fought for three quarters, with Brisbane holding a six-point lead late in the third quarter; Carlton then kicked the next six goals, with Anthony Koutoufides kicking the last three of those in quick time from full forward, to open a match-winning five-goal lead. The final margin was 13 points. The win earned Carlton a bye to the preliminary final, which it won against North Melbourne by 62 points; Carlton had led by only 19 points at three-quarter time, but kicked seven goals to none in the final quarter.

Carlton faced Geelong in the grand final. It was Geelong's fourth grand final appearance in the past seven years. When the markets opened, Geelong was a slight 8/11 favourite with bookmakers, but Carlton had edged into 8/11 favouritism by the opening bounce. The game itself, however, was a one-sided victory to Carlton. Carlton led by 40 points at half time, and extended the lead to a game-high 84 points midway through the final quarter, before finally winning by 61 points. Greg Williams won the Norm Smith Medal with 31 disposals and five goals as an attacking midfielder; Geelong full forward Gary Ablett Sr. – who had kicked 122 goals for the year – was held goalless for the first time since late 1992 by Stephen Silvagni.

**Week**	**Date and local time**	**Opponent**	**Scores** (Carlton's scores indicated in **bold**)			**Venue**	**Attendance**
**Week**	**Date and local time**	**Opponent**	Home	Away	Result	**Venue**	**Attendance**
Qualifying Finals	Sunday, 10 September (2:30 pm)	Brisbane Bears	**13.12 (90)**	12.5 (77)	Won by 13 points	Melbourne Cricket Ground (H)	52,092
Semi-finals	Received bye as the highest-ranked winner in the qualifying Finals						
Preliminary Finals	Saturday, 23 September (7:45 pm)	North Melbourne	**18.10 (118)**	8.8 (56)	Won by 62 points	Melbourne Cricket Ground (H)	72,552
Grand Final	Saturday, 30 September (2:30 pm)	Geelong	**21.15 (141)**	11.14 (80)	Won by 61 points	Melbourne Cricket Ground (H)	93,670

== Ladder ==
(P)	Premiers
	Qualified for finals

#	Team	P	W	L	D	PF	PA	%	Pts
1	Carlton (P)	22	20	2	0	2357	1711	137.8	80
2	Geelong	22	16	6	0	2558	1939	131.9	64
3	Richmond	22	15	6	1	2096	1943	107.9	62
4	Essendon	22	14	6	2	2464	1931	127.6	60
5	West Coast	22	14	8	0	2079	1692	122.9	56
6	North Melbourne	22	14	8	0	2311	2013	114.8	56
7	Footscray	22	11	10	1	1879	2054	91.5	46
8	Brisbane Bears	22	10	12	0	2104	2207	95.3	40
9	Melbourne	22	9	13	0	1938	1925	100.7	36
10	Collingwood	22	8	12	2	2043	2111	96.8	36
11	Adelaide	22	9	13	0	1749	2184	80.1	36
12	Sydney	22	8	14	0	2314	2299	100.7	32
13	Fremantle	22	8	14	0	2051	2209	92.8	32
14	St Kilda	22	8	14	0	1814	2258	80.3	32
15	Hawthorn	22	7	15	0	1857	1975	94.0	28
16	Fitzroy	22	2	20	0	1617	2780	58.2	8

Rules for classification: 1. premiership points; 2. percentage; 3. points for
Average score: 94.4
Source: AFL Tables

== Premiership team ==
The Carlton premiership twenty-one was as below.

1995 Carlton premiership team
B:	32 Adrian Whitehead	1 Stephen Silvagni	14 Michael Sexton
HB:	39 Ang Christou	35 Peter Dean	5 Andrew McKay
C:	16 Scott Camporeale	21 Craig Bradley	13 Mil Hanna
HF:	6 Matt Clape	11 Earl Spalding	43 Anthony Koutoufides
F:	19 Brad Pearce	4 Stephen Kernahan (c)	20 Fraser Brown
Foll:	44 Justin Madden	7 Brett Ratten	2 Greg Williams
Int:	22 Glenn Manton	23 Dean Rice	33 Matthew Hogg
Coach:	David Parkin		

In the lead-up to the match, there was selection speculation over the availability of two players: Scott Camporeale, who had played every game for the season except the preliminary final, which he missed with back injury, but was expected to be available; and Fraser Brown who had suffered an ankle injury during the preliminary final and whose availability was questionable. Brown had multiple treatments in a decompression chamber during grand final week to try to aid the recovery of soft tissue in his ankle. Both players were named in the team. Brown's selection on the Thursday was subject to passing a fitness test on the Saturday morning; he passed the test, but was not fully fit and played short of a stride throughout the game.

To make way for Camporeale's return, Troy Bond, who had played fifteen games for the year including both the qualifying and preliminary finals, was omitted. Bond, who was out of contract, left the club immediately, and did not attend the grand final.

Another notable inclusion in the premiership team was Matthew Hogg, who had missed almost the entire season with a foot injury. Hogg played only four senior matches for the season: the Round 22 match against Essendon, and all three finals matches.

== Notable events ==
Greg Williams racial vilification case

In the Round 21 match against West Coast, Greg Williams was reported for racially vilifying indigenous West Coast player Chris Lewis. Williams was reported under a specific new provision in the players' code of conduct which had been introduced in June following a prominent incident between Damien Monkhorst (Collingwood) and Michael Long (Essendon) on Anzac Day. Under the rules, the players would undergo private conciliation first, followed by referral to the tribunal if that failed. Williams denied any memory of the vilification, but issued a public apology to Lewis. Lewis was fined $2,000 for making his allegations public before the private conciliation process had taken place.

Greg Williams umpire abuse case

After the Round 22 match against Essendon, Greg Williams was suspended for one match for abusing umpire Darren Goldspink. It was the first time since 1987 that an AFL player had been suspended for abusing an umpire, with the charge usually attracting a fine; but Williams was a repeat offender, so the tribunal came down with a heavier penalty.

== Leading goalkickers ==
Full forward Stephen Kernahan was Carlton's leading goalkicker for the tenth consecutive season, finishing the year with 63 goals from 21 games. Close behind in second place was forward pocket Brad Pearce; at age 23, Pearce had previously played only four AFL games, but he played 23 matches in a breakout season to kick 53 goals. Half-forwards Earl Spalding and Matt Clape both kicked more than 30 goals; and Greg Williams, who was used in a more attacking role in 1995, rather than the pure centreman role he had generally played in the past, was fifth.

Player	Goals
Stephen Kernahan	63
Brad Pearce	52
Earl Spalding	34
Matt Clape	31
Greg Williams	29

== Team awards and records ==
=== Game records ===
- Round 9 – the loss against St Kilda was a rare instance of the bottom team defeating the top team in a premiership match.
- Round 10 – Carlton's quarter-time score of 9.3 (57) against Hawthorn was its highest quarter-time score since 1984.
- Round 10 – Carlton's half-time score of 16.6 (102) against Hawthorn was its highest half-time score since 1982.
- Round 10 to Grand Final – Carlton won sixteen games in a row, the longest winning streak inside a single season since Collingwood won eighteen in a row in 1929.
- Round 10 to Round 2, 1996 – Carlton won eighteen games in a row, the longest winning streak by any club since 1956.

=== Season records ===
- Carlton became the first club to win 20 matches in a 22-game home-and-away season. Seven teams had previously finished with a record of 19–3.
- The club's average home-and-away attendance of 40,138 was a new record for the club, which stood until the 2008 season.
- The club's average home attendance of 40,194 (aided by a third home match at the Melbourne Cricket Ground) was a new record for the club, which stood until the 2007 season.

=== Premiership records ===
- Carlton won its 16th senior VFL/AFL premiership, moving past Essendon (15) to become the club with the outright most senior premierships VFL/AFL history. Carlton had previously held this record from 1982–1992, and had shared the position with Essendon since 1993.

== Individual awards and records ==
=== Robert Reynolds Trophy ===
The Robert Reynolds Trophy for Carlton's senior best and fairest was awarded to Brett Ratten. It was the first of three occasions on which Ratten won the club best and fairest. After having played as a back pocket for the first few years of his career, Ratten had enjoyed a breakout season in 1995 as an in-and-under midfielder, and he led the team in handpasses and tackles for the year. Often celebrated is the fact that Ratten failed to poll a single Brownlow Medal vote for the season, even in the round 17 match against Fitzroy when he had 44 disposals.

=== All-Australian team ===
Five Carlton players and the coach were named in the 1995 All-Australian team:

- Craig Bradley (rover)
- Ang Christou (half-back flank)
- Anthony Koutoufides (interchange)
- Justin Madden (ruck)
- David Parkin (coach)
- Stephen Silvagni (full back)

=== Representative honours ===
There were two interstate matches played during the season between Rounds 11 and 12: Victoria vs South Australia, and Western Australia vs the Allies. The matches were played under full State of Origin rules. Carlton players and coaches who were selected in these games were:

- Craig Bradley – represented South Australia
- Ang Christou – represented Victoria
- Andrew McKay – represented South Australia
- Stephen Silvagni – represented Victoria

No Carlton players were selected for either Western Australia or the Allies.

=== Other awards ===
- Craig Bradley won The Age Footballer of the Year award.
- Craig Bradley was named as the No. 1 player in Herald Sun sportswriter Mike Sheahan's annual post-season Top 50 players.

=== Player records and milestones ===
- Round 3 – Stephen Kernahan kicked 10.7 (67) against Footscray, the highest score of his career.
- Round 14 – Justin Madden played his 300th VFL/AFL game.

== Reserves ==
The Carlton reserves team finished eighth out of twelve teams, with a record of 8–14 from 22 games, to miss the final six.
