= Troy Bond =

Australian rules footballer, born 1973

Personal information
- Full name: Troy Bond
- Born: 14 July 1973 (age 53)
- Original team: Port Adelaide (SANFL)
- Height: 179 cm (5 ft 10 in)
- Weight: 76 kg (168 lb)

Playing career^{1}
Years	Club	Games (Goals)
1991–1993, 1997–2000	Port Adelaide (SANFL)	59 (54)
1994–1995	Carlton	36 (26)
1996–1999	Adelaide	58 (51)
Total		153 (131)
- ^{1} Playing statistics correct to the end of 1999.

Career highlights
- AFL Premiership player (1997); AFL Rising Star nominee 1994; Port Adelaide best and fairest (1993)

Troy Bond (born 14 July 1973) is a premiership-winning former Australian rules footballer who played in the Australian Football League (AFL).

== AFL career ==
=== Carlton career (1994–1995) ===
Originally from South Australian National Football League (SANFL) club Port Adelaide, Bond started his AFL career at the Carlton Football Club in 1994, where he played 36 games and kicked 26 goals. He played fifteen games in their record-breaking premiership year in 1995 but was dropped for the Grand Final. Bond travelled home to Adelaide on the day before the big game without saying a word to coach David Parkin or his teammates.

=== Adelaide career (1996–1999) ===
Bond was traded to Adelaide at the end of the 1995 season. He had a magnificent 1997 finals series, kicking 10 goals, including four goals in the grand final win. Bond struggled with hamstring injuries in the 1998 AFL season and only managed 10 games and missed out on the chance to play in back-to-back premierships due to a shoulder reconstruction. Bond yet again only played 10 games in an injury-affected 1999 AFL season. In the first pre season with Gary Ayres as coach, Bond got as fit as he had ever been in preparation for playing in the midfield; however, a hip injury ended his 94 AFL game career. He played 58 games and kicked 63 goals for the Crows.

== Statistics ==
Legend
G	Goals	K	Kicks	D	Disposals	T	Tackles
B	Behinds	H	Handballs	M	Marks

Season	Team	No.	Games	Totals							Averages (per game)						
Season	Team	No.	Games	G	B	K	H	D	M	T	G	B	K	H	D	M	T
1994	Carlton	8	21	25	15	137	73	210	42	25	1.2	0.7	6.5	3.5	10.0	2.0	1.2
1995	Carlton	8	15	1	11	88	34	122	25	7	0.1	0.7	5.9	2.3	8.1	1.7	0.5
1996	Adelaide	18	20	14	12	234	120	354	74	21	0.7	0.6	11.7	6.0	17.7	3.7	1.1
1997†	Adelaide	18	18	20	9	149	80	229	55	33	1.1	0.5	8.3	4.4	12.7	3.1	1.8
1998	Adelaide	18	10	8	3	71	31	102	26	11	0.8	0.3	7.1	3.1	10.2	2.6	1.1
1999	Adelaide	18	10	9	7	74	32	106	26	6	0.9	0.7	7.4	3.2	10.6	2.6	0.6
Career			94	77	57	753	370	1123	248	103	0.8	0.6	8.0	3.9	11.9	2.6	1.1

== Personal life ==
Bond's younger brother Shane also played AFL football, for the West Coast Eagles and Port Adelaide Football Club.
