= Brad Pearce =

Brad Pearce may refer to:

- Brad Pearce (tennis) (born 1966), American tennis player
- Brad Pearce (footballer) (born 1971), Australian rules footballer

== See also ==
- Bradley Pierce (born 1982), American actor
