= 1995 AFL Grand Final =

Grand final of the 1995 Australian Football League season

Geelong	Carlton
11.14 (80)	21.15 (141)
	1	2	3	4
GEE	2.4 (16)	3.10 (28)	6.12 (48)	11.14 (80)
CAR	4.5 (29)	10.8 (68)	16.11 (107)	21.15 (141)
- Date: 30 September 1995
- Stadium: Melbourne Cricket Ground
- Attendance: 93,670
- Favourite: Carlton

Ceremonies
- Pre-match entertainment: Tina Arena

Accolades
- Norm Smith Medallist: Greg Williams (Carlton)
- Jock McHale Medallist: David Parkin

Broadcast in Australia
- Network: Seven Network
- Commentators: Sandy Roberts (host and commentator); Ian Robertson (commentator); Malcolm Blight (expert commentator); Robert DiPierdomenico (boundary rider); Neil Kerley (boundary rider)

The 1995 AFL Grand Final was an Australian rules football game contested between the Geelong Football Club and Carlton Football Club, held at the Melbourne Cricket Ground in Melbourne on 30 September 1995. It was the 99th annual grand final of the Australian Football League (formerly the Victorian Football League), staged to determine the premiers for the 1995 AFL season. The match was attended by 93,670 spectators. The 1995 grand final was won by Carlton by a margin of 61 points. It was Carlton's 16th premiership and most recent victory, making it one of the most successful clubs in the league's history. The game also marked Carlton's sixteenth consecutive win and twenty-third win for the year overall, then a record.

== Background ==
Both clubs were back in the grand final after recent unsuccessful attempts. Carlton had played in the grand final in 1993, which it had lost against Essendon; Geelong was back after having lost the previous year's premiership decider. Geelong had finished runners-up in three of the past six grand finals (in 1989, 1992 and 1994), and was looking for its first flag since 1963.

At the conclusion of the home and away season, Carlton had finished first on the AFL ladder with 20 wins and 2 losses, winning the McClelland Trophy. Geelong had finished second with 16 wins and 6 losses.

In the lead-up to the grand final, Carlton defeated the Brisbane Bears by 13 points in the fourth qualifying final, thereby earning the week off, and subsequently defeated North Melbourne by 62 points in the second preliminary final. Geelong defeated Footscray by 82 points in the third qualifying final before defeating Richmond by 89 points in the first preliminary final.

This grand final was billed as having the potential to be the best in years, with Carlton and Geelong finishing first and second on the ladder respectively and both in really good form. Geelong looked like it had its best chance of winning a premiership since claiming the 1963 flag, after crushing Footscray and Richmond in the previous two weeks of the finals. Carlton, on the other hand, were the standout team of 1995—the first team ever to win 20 home-and-away matches.

== Match summary ==
Team	1	2	3	Final
Geelong	2.4 (16)	3.10 (28)	6.12 (48)	11.14 (80)
Carlton	4.5 (29)	10.8 (68)	16.11 (107)	21.15 (141)

There had been strong pre-game build-up expecting a tight contest; and when the markets opened, Geelong was a slight 8/11 favourite with bookmakers, before Carlton had edged into 8/11 favouritism by the opening bounce. The game itself, however, was a very one-sided affair. Played on a wet and blustery day, the Blues were dominant in all areas of the game.

Carlton kicked the first four goals of the game, including three goals in four minutes between the 12th minute and the 16th minute. Geelong kicked two goals in time on of the first quarter to trail by only 13 points at quarter time, but had been thoroughly outplayed and was considered lucky to be so close. Carlton continued to dominate the second quarter, kicking six goals to one such that the game was effectively over by half time, Carlton leading by 40 points. Carlton's Earl Spalding also produced one of the more memorable moments of the game early in the second quarter, when he applied a smother on a Peter Riccardi kick, picked up the ball, and set up a goal for himself. A brawl involving most players erupted after the half-time siren following a clash between Ang Christou and Billy Brownless; at the tribunal later in October, Carlton was fined $25,000, Geelong was fined $30,000 and Barry Stoneham was fined $5,000 for the melee.

The game was no different in the second half. Carlton kicked five of the first six goals of the third quarter to extend the lead to twelve goals before two goals in time-on brought the margin back to 59 points at three quarter time, and key Geelong playmaker Peter Riccardi tore his hamstring early in the third term. By time-on in the final quarter, Carlton had extended the margin to a game-high 86 points, before late goals brought the final margin back to 61 points. It was the second successive year that Geelong had been blown out in the grand final, after losing to West Coast the previous year by 80 points.

The Norm Smith Medal was won by Greg Williams, who starred as an attacking midfielder. He kicked five goals, including three in the third quarter, and assisted on another three; and he finished the game with 31 disposals, including ten in the opening quarter. Carlton full back Stephen Silvagni also attracted high praise for keeping champion Geelong full forward Gary Ablett Sr. goalless, the first time Ablett had been kept goalless in a game since 1992. Other dominant players for Carlton included Justin Madden, who won the ruck battle comfortably, as well as Brett Ratten, Anthony Koutoufides, Stephen Kernahan and Craig Bradley.

In the post-match ceremony when Carlton players were being awarded their victory medallions, Peter Dean attempted to jump over the railing of the victory dais in celebration, but tripped and fell off it. He was not injured.

== Teams ==
Geelong	Carlton

Geelong
B:	17 Tim McGrath	36 Ben Graham	21 Michael Mansfield
HB:	12 Brad Sholl	14 Steven Handley	40 Paul Brown
C:	4 Aaron Lord	7 Paul Couch	2 Leigh Colbert
HF:	11 Leigh Tudor	31 David Mensch	9 Shayne Breuer
F:	16 Billy Brownless	5 Gary Ablett (c)	15 Peter Riccardi
Foll:	6 John Barnes	23 Liam Pickering	32 Garry Hocking
Int:	10 Grant Tanner	29 Ken Hinkley	42 Adrian Hickmott
Coach:	Gary Ayres		

Carlton
B:	14 Michael Sexton	1 Stephen Silvagni	39 Ang Christou
HB:	33 Matthew Hogg	35 Peter Dean	5 Andrew McKay
C:	13 Milham Hanna	7 Brett Ratten	43 Anthony Koutoufides
HF:	23 Dean Rice	11 Earl Spalding	6 Matt Clape
F:	2 Greg Williams	4 Stephen Kernahan (c)	19 Brad Pearce
Foll:	44 Justin Madden	21 Craig Bradley	20 Fraser Brown
Int:	16 Scott Camporeale	32 Adrian Whitehead	22 Glenn Manton
Coach:	David Parkin		

== Goal kickers ==
Geelong

- Brownless 3
- Handley 3
- Breuer 1
- Couch 1
- Mensch 1
- Pickering 1
- Riccardi 1

Carlton

- Kernahan 5
- Williams 5
- Pearce 4
- Bradley 2
- Camporeale 1
- Madden 1
- Rice 1
- Spalding 1
- Whitehead 1

== See also ==
- 1995 AFL season
