= Dean Rice =

Australian rules footballer

- Children: Bailey Rice, Mitchell Rice, Xavier Rice
Australian rules football career
Personal information
- Full name: Dean Rice
- Nickname: "Special Fried" / "Dricey"
- Born: 17 March 1968 (age 58)
- Original teams: Salesian College, Longwood
- Draft: 19th overall, 1994 Pre-season Draft
- Height: 180 cm (5 ft 11 in)
- Weight: 92 kg (203 lb)
- Position: Utility
Playing career^{1}
| Years | Club | Games (Goals) |
| 1987–1993 | St Kilda | 116 (43) |
| 1994–2001 | Carlton | 118 (42) |
| Total | | 234 (85) |
- ^{1} Playing statistics correct to the end of 2001.
Career highlights
- Carlton Premiership Player 1995

Dean Rice (born 17 March 1968) is a former Australian rules footballer who played for Carlton and St Kilda in the VFL/AFL. His uncle Colin captained Geelong.

Rice played in the 1985 Benalla & District Football League premiership with Longwood, who were coached by Dean's brother, Tony. Rice started his career in 1987 at St Kilda after being recruited from Salesian College via Longwood.

Plagued by injuries, he underwent two knee reconstructions at St Kilda. He was delisted by St Kilda and chosen as pick 19 by Carlton in the 1994 Pre-Season Draft, injuring his knee in his first game at Carlton and again requiring a reconstruction. Despite playing in the wing at St Kilda he found himself being pushed up forward. It was as a half forward that he helped Carlton to win the 1995 Grand Final, kicking one goal and getting 10 disposals. Later in his career he was used in defence and he retired in 2001.

== Statistics ==
Legend
| G | Goals | K | Kicks | D | Disposals | T | Tackles |
| B | Behinds | H | Handballs | M | Marks |

| Season | Team | No. | Games | Totals | | | | | | | Averages (per game) | | | | | | | Votes |
| Season | Team | No. | Games | G | B | K | H | D | M | T | G | B | K | H | D | M | T | Votes |
|---|---|---|---|---|---|---|---|---|---|---|---|---|---|---|---|---|---|---|
| 1987 | St Kilda | 37 | 20 | 2 | 4 | 188 | 109 | 297 | 69 | 29 | 0.1 | 0.2 | 9.4 | 5.5 | 14.9 | 3.5 | 1.5 | 2 |
| 1988 | St Kilda | 37 | 22 | 5 | 4 | 254 | 109 | 363 | 78 | 42 | 0.2 | 0.2 | 11.5 | 5.0 | 16.5 | 3.5 | 1.9 | 1 |
| 1989 | St Kilda | 37 | 22 | 4 | 1 | 236 | 89 | 325 | 67 | 40 | 0.2 | 0.0 | 10.7 | 4.0 | 14.8 | 3.0 | 1.8 | 5 |
| 1990 | St Kilda | 37 | 18 | 3 | 7 | 231 | 100 | 331 | 63 | 25 | 0.2 | 0.4 | 12.8 | 5.6 | 18.4 | 3.5 | 1.4 | 6 |
| 1991 | St Kilda | 37 | 23 | 21 | 20 | 290 | 126 | 416 | 94 | 38 | 0.9 | 0.9 | 12.6 | 5.5 | 18.1 | 4.1 | 1.7 | 1 |
| 1992 | St Kilda | 37 | 0 | — | — | — | — | — | — | — | — | — | — | — | — | — | — | — |
| 1993 | St Kilda | 37 | 11 | 8 | 4 | 109 | 46 | 155 | 47 | 15 | 0.7 | 0.4 | 9.9 | 4.2 | 14.1 | 4.3 | 1.4 | 0 |
| 1994 | Carlton | 23 | 1 | 1 | 0 | 3 | 1 | 4 | 2 | 0 | 1.0 | 0.0 | 3.0 | 1.0 | 4.0 | 2.0 | 0.0 | 0 |
| 1995† | Carlton | 23 | 18 | 21 | 15 | 151 | 93 | 244 | 56 | 23 | 1.2 | 0.8 | 8.4 | 5.2 | 13.6 | 3.1 | 1.3 | 2 |
| 1996 | Carlton | 23 | 8 | 3 | 0 | 41 | 31 | 72 | 18 | 10 | 0.4 | 0.0 | 5.1 | 3.9 | 9.0 | 2.3 | 1.3 | 1 |
| 1997 | Carlton | 23 | 10 | 2 | 1 | 91 | 45 | 136 | 32 | 13 | 0.2 | 0.1 | 9.1 | 4.5 | 13.6 | 3.2 | 1.3 | 1 |
| 1998 | Carlton | 23 | 22 | 8 | 5 | 235 | 110 | 345 | 75 | 31 | 0.4 | 0.2 | 10.7 | 5.0 | 15.7 | 3.4 | 1.4 | 1 |
| 1999 | Carlton | 23 | 24 | 5 | 5 | 198 | 102 | 300 | 67 | 23 | 0.2 | 0.2 | 8.3 | 4.3 | 12.5 | 2.8 | 1.0 | 0 |
| 2000 | Carlton | 23 | 24 | 2 | 3 | 200 | 75 | 275 | 73 | 37 | 0.1 | 0.1 | 8.3 | 3.1 | 11.5 | 3.0 | 1.5 | 0 |
| 2001 | Carlton | 23 | 11 | 0 | 3 | 64 | 30 | 94 | 22 | 8 | 0.0 | 0.3 | 5.8 | 2.7 | 8.5 | 2.0 | 0.7 | 0 |
| Career | | | 234 | 85 | 72 | 2291 | 1066 | 3357 | 763 | 334 | 0.4 | 0.3 | 9.8 | 4.6 | 14.3 | 3.3 | 1.4 | 20 |
