= Glenn Manton =

Australian rules footballer

Personal information
- Full name: Glenn David Manton
- Born: 1 June 1973 (age 53)
- Original team: East Keilor/Strathmore
- Height: 185 cm (6 ft 1 in)
- Weight: 88 kg (194 lb)

Playing career^{1}
Years	Club	Games (Goals)
1992 – 1994	Essendon	21 (4)
1995 – 2003	Carlton	157 (30)
Total		178 (34)
- ^{1} Playing statistics correct to the end of 2003.

Glenn Manton (born 1 June 1973) is a former Australian rules footballer who played for Carlton and Essendon. Since leaving the AFL, he has been an author, media personality, youth advocate and professional speaker.

== AFL career ==
Manton played for both Strathmore and East Keilor before joining the Essendon Under-19s as a 16-year-old. He made his AFL debut in 1992 at age 18 for the Bombers and played 21 games over three seasons for them. He was delisted by Essendon after the 1994 season, then recruited by Carlton in the 1995 Pre-season draft. He played 12 games for the club during the 1995 season, mostly off the interchange bench, and was part of the club's 1995 Premiership Team, the only AFL premiership of his career.

Over the following seasons, Manton cemented his position in the Carlton team, playing primarily as a strong-spoiling defender, occasionally playing in the forward line. He was a regular selection in the team from 1996 until 2001, and played in the 1999 Grand Final when Carlton lost to North Melbourne.

Manton was delisted at the end of the 2003 season, after only five senior appearances that year. At the end of his career he had appeared 157 times for Carlton and 178 times overall. He played in a total of three pre-season premierships for Carlton and Essendon, a Reserve Grade Premiership for Essendon and by the conclusion of his career he was inducted into the AFL's 200 Club.

== Statistics ==
Legend
G	Goals	K	Kicks	D	Disposals	T	Tackles
B	Behinds	H	Handballs	M	Marks

Season	Team	No.	Games	Totals							Averages (per game)							Votes
Season	Team	No.	Games	G	B	K	H	D	M	T	G	B	K	H	D	M	T	Votes
1992	Essendon	53	2	0	0	9	6	15	7	0	0.0	0.0	4.5	3.0	7.5	3.5	0.0	0
1993	Essendon	37	7	0	0	28	30	58	19	3	0.0	0.0	4.0	4.3	8.3	2.7	0.4	0
1994	Essendon	25	12	4	4	64	59	123	50	7	0.3	0.3	5.3	4.9	10.3	4.2	0.6	0
1995†	Carlton	22	12	2	2	28	46	74	14	11	0.2	0.2	2.3	3.8	6.2	1.2	0.9	0
1996	Carlton	22	24	7	4	194	141	335	150	45	0.3	0.2	8.1	5.9	14.0	6.3	1.9	4
1997	Carlton	22	20	10	7	118	104	222	96	23	0.5	0.4	5.9	5.2	11.1	4.8	1.2	2
1998	Carlton	22	20	9	0	99	140	239	113	27	0.5	0.0	5.0	7.0	12.0	5.7	1.4	1
1999	Carlton	22	26	2	6	105	189	294	116	24	0.1	0.2	4.0	7.3	11.3	4.5	0.9	0
2000	Carlton	22	17	0	0	46	60	106	36	20	0.0	0.0	2.7	3.5	6.2	2.1	1.2	0
2001	Carlton	22	24	0	0	102	89	191	88	19	0.0	0.0	4.3	3.7	8.0	3.7	0.8	0
2002	Carlton	22	9	0	0	21	33	54	17	7	0.0	0.0	2.3	3.7	6.0	1.9	0.8	0
2003	Carlton	22	5	0	0	18	17	35	15	3	0.0	0.0	3.6	3.4	7.0	3.0	0.6	0
Career			178	34	23	832	914	1746	721	189	0.2	0.1	4.7	5.1	9.8	4.1	1.1	7

== Post-AFL ==
Following his AFL career, Manton attempted a transition to soccer with South Melbourne Hellas, trying out as goalkeeper. He then spent the next couple of years competing in the four-man bobsleigh, training throughout 2004 and then racing on the World Cup circuit as part of the Australian team in 2005 and 2006. He has since returned to playing Australian rules football periodically at a local level.

Throughout his playing time, he was a regular panellist on Nine Network's The Footy Show, where he developed a reputation for his larrikinism and comedic ability. After his retirement, he performed at Melbourne International Comedy Festivals, was a regular on Vega 91.5, community radio station 3RRR, Fox Football programs and wrote a regular column for MX. He is a former board member of Melbourne Fringe, and later performed in the 2016 Melbourne Fringe Festival.

In 1999, after completing a degree in education, Manton co-founded Whitelion, a not-for-profit organisation assisting youth in crisis within the juvenile justice system. As a motivational speaker, he addresses a wide range of audiences, and also works with Red Dust, a not-for-profit group which helps Indigenous communities. His motivation to work in the field stemmed in part from his own experiences of being mentored as a troubled youth: at the age of 17, he nearly lost the use of his arm after breaking a thick glass window with it (he wore an arm-guard throughout his football career due to the injury), before the personal counselling he received from former Essendon player Alec Epis helped him to transform his outlook on life.

He is the author of several books, including Dead Bolt, Praying Manton, Mongrel Punts and Hard Ball Gets, Tattoo Urself, I was Verka Serduchka, Authentic, Call that a Bovril? and Put Your Damn Phone Down.

Manton is a regular contributor on Afternoons with Tony Moclair and Nights with Denis Walter on 3AW.

== Publications ==
- Dead Bolt: Sightings from the Outer, Wilkinson Publishing, 2004, ISBN 1875889698
- Mongrel Punts and Hard Ball Gets, an A-Z of Footy Speak, with Paula Hunt, Red Dog Books, 2012, ISBN 9781742591278
- Tattoo Urself: Line, Colour, Shade, Glenn Manton, 2015, ISBN 9780646945279
- Authentic, Glenn Manton, 2015, ISBN 9780646936659
- Put Your Damn Phone Down, Brio Books, 2018, ISBN 9781925589641
