= 1995 Ansett Australia Cup =

- AFL pre-season competition
- Season: 1995
- Teams: 16
- Winners: North Melbourne (1st title)
- Matches played: 15
- Attendance: 250,103 (average 16,674 per match)
- Michael Tuck Medallist: Mick Martyn (North Melbourne)

The 1995 AFL Ansett Australia Cup was the Australian Football League Pre-season Cup competition played in its entirety before the Australian Football League's 1995 Premiership Season began. It culminated the final in March 1995.

== Games ==
=== Round of 16 ===
Home team	Home team score	Away team	Away team score	Ground	Crowd	Date	Time
Fremantle	13.8 (86)	St Kilda	19.7 (121)	East Fremantle Oval	10,028	Friday 24 February 1995	4:00 PM
Carlton	20.9 (129)	Richmond	13.9 (87)	Waverley Park	23,678	Saturday, 25 February 1995	8:00 PM
North Melbourne	17.18 (120)	Brisbane	8.12 (60)	Waverley Park	4,737	Sunday, 26 February 1995	1:05 PM
Essendon	14.10 (94)	Fitzroy	8.13 (61)	Waverley Park	10,469	Monday, 27 February 1995	8:00 PM
Collingwood	12.15 (87)	Footscray	12.16 (88)	Waverley Park	18,310	Wednesday 1 March 1995	8:00 PM
Sydney	18.11 (119)	Hawthorn	16.10 (106)	Bruce Stadium	11,644	Saturday 4 March 1995	1:05 PM
Melbourne	11.11 (77)	West Coast	16.15 (111)	Waverley Park	9,348	Saturday, 4 March 1995	8:00 PM
Adelaide	23.16 (154)	Geelong	13.15 (93)	Football Park	13,866	Sunday 5 March 1995	12:05 PM

=== Quarter-finals ===
Home team	Home team score	Away team	Away team score	Ground	Crowd	Date	Time
St Kilda	12.11 (83)	Carlton	12.10 (82)	Waverley Park	12,476	Monday 6 March 1995	8:00 PM
North Melbourne	14.18 (102)	Essendon	11.9 (75)	Waverley Park	19,492	Wednesday, 8 March 1995	8:05 PM
Footscray	10.12 (72)	Sydney	16.10 (106)	Waverley Park	10,721	Saturday 11 March 1995	8:00 PM
Adelaide	14.14 (98)	West Coast	6.11 (47)	Football Park	18,909	Sunday, 12 March 1995	12:05 PM

=== Semi-finals ===
Home team	Home team score	Away team	Away team score	Ground	Crowd	Date	Time
St Kilda	12.11 (83)	North Melbourne	13.14 (92)	Waverley Park	15,873	Wednesday 15 March 1995	8:00 PM
Adelaide	18.11 (119)	Sydney	14.7 (91)	Football Park	31,159	Saturday, 18 March 1995	8:00 PM

=== Final ===
Home team	Home team score	Away team	Away team score	Ground	Crowd	Date	Time
North Melbourne	14.9 (93)	Adelaide	8.15 (63)	Waverley Park	39,393	Saturday 25 March 1995	8:00 PM

== See also ==
- List of Australian Football League night premiers
- 1995 AFL season
