= Stephen Silvagni =

Australian rules footballer (born 1967)

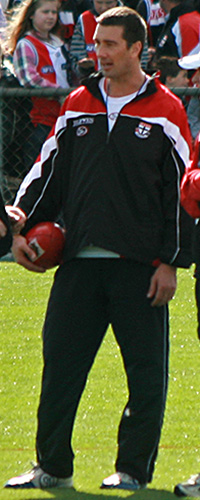
- Silvagni in September 2009

Personal information
- Nickname: Sos
- Born: 31 May 1967 (age 59); Melbourne, Victoria, Australia
- Original team: Marcellin College/Bulleen-Templestowe
- Height: 194 cm (6 ft 4 in)
- Weight: 95 kg (209 lb)
- Position: Full Back/Centre Half Back/Centre Half Forward

Playing career^{1}
Years	Club	Games (Goals)
1985–2001	Carlton	312 (202)
- ^{1} Playing statistics correct to the end of 2001.

Career highlights
- 2× VFL/AFL Premiership player: (1987, 1995); 2× Robert Reynolds Trophy: (1990, 1996); Carlton Life Member: 1992; Carlton Vice-Captain: 1998–2001; Australian Football Hall of Fame, inducted 2005; Carlton Hall of Fame, inducted 1996, Legend status 1997; 5x All-Australian team: (1994, 1995, 1996, 1997, 1999); AFL Team of the Century (fullback); Mark of the Year: 1988; AFL Life Member: 1999; International Rules 1998, 1999; Carlton Team of the Century (fullback); Jim Stynes Medal 1998; VFL/AFL Italian Team of the Century (fullback)

Stephen Silvagni (born 31 May 1967) is a former Australian rules footballer who played for the Carlton Football Club in the Australian Football League (AFL). Coming second in three generations of Silvagnis to represent the Blues, he is regarded as one of the greatest ever full-backs to play the game and was named as full-back in the AFL Team of the Century and is an inductee in the Australian Football Hall of Fame. Prior to 1985 he captained the undefeated Marcellin College 1st XVIII that won both the 1984 Associated Grammar Schools premiership, and the coveted Herald Shield Cup then played under lights at Waverley Park.

He is widely known by his nickname, "SOS" (pronounced "Soss"), standing for "Son of Serge", referring to his father, Sergio Silvagni, another great Carlton player.

After retiring from playing, Silvagni has worked as an assistant coach and list manager at several AFL clubs. He is the former list manager of Carlton Football Club. On January 27, 2023, St Kilda Football Club confirmed the appointment of Stephen Silvagni as their new list manager.

== Playing career ==
=== Carlton ===
Silvagni was drafted to Carlton under the father–son rule, being the son of former Carlton Blues champion Sergio Silvagni and it was scarcely a surprise when he followed in his father's footsteps and made his Carlton debut, aged 17, in 1985. He is widely known by his nickname, "SOS" (pronounced "Soss"), standing for "Son of Serge", Silvagni was a highly energetic, resourceful footballer who was regarded as one of the finest full backs. He could also do a job in the forward lines, however, and some of his most memorable displays came after he was thrown into attack in an effort to bolster the team's performance.

Silvagni's defensive skills were renowned and earned him the status as a true clubman at Carlton. In 1996's AFL Team of the Century, Silvagni had the honour of being named at full-back. He retained the title as the best full-back for four years in succession, although he was also known for his marking and goalkicking ability when playing at the opposite end of the ground in the full-forward position at times, even kicking a bag of 10 goals in Round 16, 1993 against the Fitzroy Lions.

Possibly his finest game was in the 1995 AFL Grand Final where he kept Geelong legend Gary Ablett goalless for the entire game.

In addition to Silvagni's blanketing tactics, he was also a renowned high-flyer, taking out the Mark of the Year in 1988. However, when one such mark led to an ankle injury, the high-flying aspect of his game largely disappeared.

Silvagni retired from his playing career at the end of the 2001 season, after he announced that he was taking specialist advice to call it a day after 16 seasons.

A year after his retirement at the end of the 2001 season he announced that he would make a comeback to assist Carlton, following their penalties for salary cap infringements. He however changed his mind soon after and was not a listed player for the 2003 season.

Silvagni also played as goalkeeper for the Australian International Rules team on several occasions, and won the inaugural Jim Stynes Medal in 1998.

Silvagni was a five time All-Australian, being selected in 1994, 1995, 1996, 1997 and 1999.

Silvagni played for Carlton Football Club from 1985 until 2001 for a total of 312 games and kicked a total of 202 goals. Silvangi was also a member of Carlton's 1987 and 1995 premiership sides

== Coaching career ==
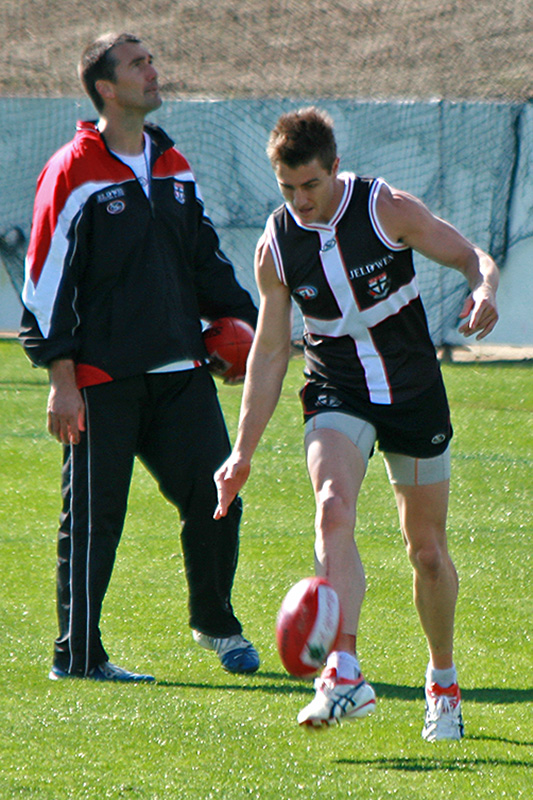
Silvagni as St Kilda assistant coach watches over Sam Fisher at training prior to the 2009 AFL Grand Final

After retiring from playing, Silvagni worked as an assistant coach at six AFL clubs between 2002 and 2010: Collingwood, Sydney, Western Bulldogs and St Kilda.

== Sports administration career ==
=== Greater Western Sydney ===
In 2011, Silvagni took on the role of list manager with the fledgling Greater Western Sydney Giants.

=== Carlton ===
He returned to Carlton as list manager in 2014. He was notably active in recruiting former GWS players to Carlton, with nine former GWS players shifting to Carlton in Silvagni's first three recruiting years. Stephen departed the Carlton Football Club, when he left his role as list manager on 4 December 2019, following the 2019 AFL season.

On 21 October 2020, nearly a year after Silvagni's departure from the Carlton Football Club in his role as list manager, Silvagni gave an interview on SEN radio station and he was critical of the club's administrators of Carlton Football Club President Mark LoGiudice and Carlton Football Club CEO Cain Liddle during his time at the club in his tenure as the list manager. Silvagni then described his tenure at the club as a "messy" situation because of the falling out with the club's management.

=== St Kilda ===
On 27 January 2023, Silvagni was appointed to the role of list manager at St Kilda Football Club.

== Statistics ==
Legend
G	Goals	K	Kicks	D	Disposals	T	Tackles
B	Behinds	H	Handballs	M	Marks

Season	Team	No.	Games	Totals							Averages (per game)							Votes
Season	Team	No.	Games	G	B	K	H	D	M	T	G	B	K	H	D	M	T	Votes
1985	Carlton	1	17	1	0	133	61	194	61	—N/a	0.1	0.0	7.8	3.6	11.4	3.6	—N/a	4
1986	Carlton	1	13	9	8	87	42	129	45	—N/a	0.7	0.6	6.7	3.2	9.9	3.5	—N/a	0
1987†	Carlton	1	15	24	9	99	54	153	50	21	1.6	0.6	6.6	3.6	10.2	3.3	1.4	0
1988	Carlton	1	24	12	12	187	99	286	74	31	0.5	0.5	7.8	4.1	11.9	3.1	1.3	9
1989	Carlton	1	6	8	8	50	18	68	24	10	1.3	1.3	8.3	3.0	11.3	4.0	1.7	0
1990	Carlton	1	22	5	7	206	142	348	109	51	0.2	0.3	9.4	6.5	15.8	5.0	2.3	16
1991	Carlton	1	9	3	4	92	68	160	48	18	0.3	0.4	10.2	7.6	17.8	5.3	2.0	6
1992	Carlton	1	12	28	12	70	34	104	43	11	2.3	1.0	5.8	2.8	8.7	3.6	0.9	5
1993	Carlton	1	22	20	14	185	118	303	91	32	0.9	0.6	8.4	5.4	13.8	4.1	1.5	6
1994	Carlton	1	24	4	3	170	133	303	76	40	0.2	0.1	7.1	5.5	12.6	3.2	1.7	6
1995†	Carlton	1	24	7	8	213	91	304	82	29	0.3	0.3	8.9	3.8	12.7	3.4	1.2	1
1996	Carlton	1	24	6	4	173	92	265	75	44	0.3	0.2	7.2	3.8	11.0	3.1	1.8	5
1997	Carlton	1	18	25	13	156	66	222	76	20	1.4	0.7	8.7	3.7	12.3	4.2	1.1	5
1998	Carlton	1	18	15	14	166	59	225	61	34	0.8	0.8	9.2	3.3	12.5	3.4	1.9	2
1999	Carlton	1	24	15	20	216	117	333	108	25	0.6	0.8	9.0	4.9	13.9	4.5	1.0	2
2000	Carlton	1	20	5	1	177	105	282	89	33	0.3	0.1	8.9	5.3	14.1	4.5	1.7	0
2001	Carlton	1	20	15	13	172	107	279	111	26	0.8	0.7	8.6	5.4	14.0	5.6	1.3	2
Career			312	202	150	2552	1406	3958	1223	425	0.6	0.5	8.2	4.5	12.7	3.9	1.5	69

== Personal life ==
Stephen Silvagni married television celebrity Jo Bailey in 1996, and they have three sons. Their eldest son Jack was drafted by Carlton in 2015. He played 128 games before transferring to St Kilda at the end of the 2025 season. Their second son, Ben, was also drafted by the Carlton Football Club in the 2018 AFL draft but was subsequently delisted after the 2020 season without having played a game. His third son is Tom Silvagni, who was convicted of rape in 2025, whose name was revealed after a lengthy suppression order was lifted.

Since retiring from playing football he has worked in the media as a guest football commentator.

Former Carlton Football Club key defender Alex Silvagni is Stephen's second cousin. (Alex's father Eric and Stephen's father Sergio are first cousins.)

== See also ==
- List of Australian rules football families
