= Matthew Hogg =

Australian rules footballer

Personal information
- Full name: Matthew Hogg
- Born: 21 December 1968 (age 57)
- Original team: East Keilor
- Height: 175 cm (5 ft 9 in)
- Weight: 79 kg (174 lb)

Playing career^{1}
Years	Club	Games (Goals)
1988–1991	Footscray	59 (4)
1992–1999	Carlton	114 (38)
Total		173 (42)
- ^{1} Playing statistics correct to the end of 1999.

Career highlights
- Carlton Premiership Team: 1995

Matthew Hogg (born 21 December 1968) is a former Australian rules footballer who played for Footscray and Carlton.

Hogg started his career at Footscray after being recruited from East Keilor. Carlton then picked up Hogg at pick 18 in the 1991 National Draft. He usually played as a tagger for the Blues, and at the peak of his abilities in the mid-1990s he was considered one of the best attacking taggers in the league; but was also known to spend time in the back pocket. He was a member of Carlton's 1995 premiership team; although he had been injured throughout most of Carlton's record-breaking 1995 season, missing the first 21 games after having foot surgery, he returned in the final round and played all three finals to earn the premiership medallion. He represented Victoria 1994 in State of Origin against South Australia. In 1996 he won the Best Clubman Award for the Blues.

Hogg injured a hand against Port Adelaide in an early game of 1999, and he spent much of the season in the reserves. The AFL Record published an article about Hogg in its Round 22 edition, reflecting on Hogg's career and how it would come to an anticlimactic conclusion that week in the reserves' final game; the article would prove to be embarrassingly inaccurate. Hogg was called up from the emergency list at the last minute to play against Richmond at the MCG that week (the game best remembered for the Ponsford Stand scoreboard catching fire), and would go on to play in Carlton's semi-final win against West Coast, played a vital tagging role in the memorable one-point victory against Essendon in the preliminary final, and the Grand Final loss against the Kangaroos.

Hogg played 59 games for Footscray with 4 goals, and 114 games for Carlton with 38 goals. He is a life member of the Carlton Football Club.

== Statistics ==
Legend
G	Goals	K	Kicks	D	Disposals	T	Tackles
B	Behinds	H	Handballs	M	Marks

Season	Team	No.	Games	Totals							Averages (per game)							Votes
Season	Team	No.	Games	G	B	K	H	D	M	T	G	B	K	H	D	M	T	Votes
1988	Footscray	43	14	0	3	127	32	159	27	18	0.0	0.2	9.1	2.3	11.4	1.9	1.3	0
1989	Footscray	43	21	2	2	228	69	297	60	51	0.1	0.1	10.9	3.3	14.1	2.9	2.4	1
1990	Footscray	43	14	2	1	109	71	180	31	22	0.1	0.1	7.8	5.1	12.9	2.2	1.6	2
1991	Footscray	43	10	0	0	69	39	108	18	10	0.0	0.0	6.9	3.9	10.8	1.8	1.0	0
1992	Carlton	33	17	6	3	133	54	187	24	28	0.4	0.2	7.8	3.2	11.0	1.4	1.6	4
1993	Carlton	33	19	4	6	159	80	239	45	45	0.2	0.3	8.4	4.2	12.6	2.4	2.4	0
1994	Carlton	33	24	16	16	202	167	369	62	58	0.7	0.7	8.4	7.0	15.4	2.6	2.4	1
1995†	Carlton	33	4	0	1	30	5	35	10	4	0.0	0.3	7.5	1.3	8.8	2.5	1.0	0
1996	Carlton	33	11	2	0	82	52	134	23	11	0.2	0.0	7.5	4.7	12.2	2.1	1.0	0
1997	Carlton	33	18	6	2	137	68	205	46	22	0.3	0.1	7.6	3.8	11.4	2.6	1.2	0
1998	Carlton	33	14	3	4	103	53	156	26	23	0.2	0.3	7.4	3.8	11.1	1.9	1.6	0
1999	Carlton	33	7	1	1	23	9	32	5	4	0.1	0.1	3.3	1.3	4.6	0.7	0.6	0
Career			173	42	39	1402	699	2101	377	296	0.2	0.2	8.1	4.0	12.1	2.2	1.7	8
