= Ang Christou =

Australian rules footballer (born 1972)

Personal information
- Born: 16 January 1972 (age 54)
- Original team: East Brunswick
- Debut: Round 24, 1991, Carlton vs. Richmond, at MCG
- Height: 190 cm (6 ft 3 in)
- Weight: 90 kg (198 lb)

Playing career^{1}
Years	Club	Games (Goals)
1991–2002	Carlton	151 (20)
- ^{1} Playing statistics correct to the end of 2002.

Career highlights
- 1993 AFL Rising Star nominee; 1995 All-Australian team; 1995 Premiership Player

Angelo Christou (born 16 January 1972) is a former Australian rules footballer for Carlton in the Australian Football League.

== AFL career ==
Christou played for the Carlton Football Club and along with Anthony Koutoufides was a popular figure as a Greek Australian.

In 2001, Christou had a solid pre-season, but missed the first month of the AFL season due to a knee injury. After his return in Round 7, Christou was noted for his penetrating kicks from defence. However, he was dropped after Round 17 playing only 13 games for the season, including a recall for the finals series of 2001 (receiving limited game time).

Christou was noted for his long, accurate left foot kicks, often upwards of 60–65 metres. Whenever taking a kick, short or long, a chant from the Carlton crowd of "WOOF!" would always be heard. Christou was the second Carlton player to receive this chant, after Val Perovic (another long, left-footed defender) during the 1980s.

== Statistics ==
Legend
G	Goals	K	Kicks	D	Disposals	T	Tackles
B	Behinds	H	Handballs	M	Marks
#	Played in that season's premiership team

Season	Team	No.	Games	Totals							Averages (per game)							Votes
Season	Team	No.	Games	G	B	K	H	D	M	T	G	B	K	H	D	M	T	Votes
1991	Carlton	56	1	1	2	8	4	12	5	1	1.0	2.0	8.0	4.0	12.0	5.0	1.0	0
1992	Carlton	39	5	1	0	38	10	48	4	10	0.2	0.0	7.6	2.0	9.6	0.8	2.0	0
1993	Carlton	39	18	5	1	166	83	249	58	27	0.3	0.1	9.2	4.6	13.8	3.2	1.5	3
1994	Carlton	39	24	3	4	282	123	405	85	39	0.1	0.2	11.8	5.1	16.9	3.5	1.6	5
1995 ^{#}	Carlton	39	25	6	5	339	118	457	92	50	0.2	0.2	13.6	4.7	18.3	3.7	2.0	7
1996	Carlton	39	24	1	8	283	87	370	83	26	0.0	0.3	11.8	3.6	15.4	3.5	1.1	3
1997	Carlton	39	8	0	0	99	31	130	30	14	0.0	0.0	12.4	3.9	16.3	3.8	1.8	0
1998	Carlton	39	0	—	—	—	—	—	—	—	—	—	—	—	—	—	—	—
1999	Carlton	39	11	0	0	87	36	123	21	10	0.0	0.0	7.9	3.3	11.2	1.9	0.9	0
2000	Carlton	39	10	1	1	80	30	110	12	11	0.1	0.1	8.0	3.0	11.0	1.2	1.1	0
2001	Carlton	39	13	1	1	116	53	169	39	19	0.1	0.1	8.9	4.1	13.0	3.0	1.5	0
2002	Carlton	39	12	1	1	127	52	179	44	24	0.1	0.1	10.6	4.3	14.9	3.7	2.0	0
Career			151	20	23	1625	627	2252	473	231	0.1	0.2	10.8	4.2	14.9	3.1	1.5	18

== Post-football career ==
Christou participated in the E. J. Whitten Legends Game in 2003 and was awarded Man of the Match for his great game that night and was met with an enthused reaction from the crowd.

There was talk of Christou trying out as a punter for the National Football League in early 2003, a three-man crew from a US club (the identity of which Christou refused to reveal) spent two weeks in Melbourne putting him through a series of stringent tests however no signing resulted.

He co-owned the Souvlaki Hut restaurant in Templestowe Lower in Melbourne's north-east with former Carlton teammate Anthony Koutoufides, until its closure in early 2011.

He married his girlfriend Tammy on 14 May 2016.
