= Peter Dean (footballer) =

Australian rules footballer

Personal information
- Full name: Peter Dean
- Born: 9 March 1965 (age 61)
- Original team: South Bendigo
- Height: 188 cm (6 ft 2 in)
- Weight: 85 kg (187 lb)

Playing career^{1}
Years	Club	Games (Goals)
1984–1998	Carlton	248 (41)
- ^{1} Playing statistics correct to the end of 1998.

Career highlights
- South Bendigo FC best & fairest: 1983; Victorian Country side: 1983; Carlton Premiership Team: 1987, 1995

Peter Dean (born 9 March 1965) is a former Australian rules footballer who played for Carlton from 1984 to 1998 as a defender.

From South Bendigo, Dean won two VFL / AFL premierships with Carlton, in 1987 and 1995. After retiring, Dean was also a runner for the Blues.

Dean coached the Murray Bushrangers Football Club in the TAC Cup in 2006 and 2007.

In 2015 Carlton named its father–son academy the Peter Dean Father–Son Academy.

In 2025, his son Harry Dean was pick number three in the 2025 AFL draft by Carlton under the father-son rule.

On the evening of 9 February 2026 Dean was reportedly hospitalised after being assaulted by a group of people in Albury. A 17-year-old male was later arrested following inquiries by detectives from the Murray River Police District.

== Statistics ==
Legend
G	Goals	K	Kicks	D	Disposals	T	Tackles
B	Behinds	H	Handballs	M	Marks

Season	Team	No.	Games	Totals							Averages (per game)							Votes
Season	Team	No.	Games	G	B	K	H	D	M	T	G	B	K	H	D	M	T	Votes
1984	Carlton	35	13	6	0	115	64	179	48	—N/a	0.5	0.0	8.8	4.9	13.8	3.7	—N/a	2
1985	Carlton	35	19	2	5	171	86	257	73	—N/a	0.1	0.3	9.0	4.5	13.5	3.8	—N/a	1
1986	Carlton	35	24	3	2	167	151	318	84	—N/a	0.1	0.1	7.0	6.3	13.3	3.5	—N/a	0
1987†	Carlton	35	19	2	4	111	118	229	54	21	0.1	0.2	5.8	6.2	12.1	2.8	1.1	0
1988	Carlton	35	3	0	0	21	17	38	12	4	0.0	0.0	7.0	5.7	12.7	4.0	1.3	0
1989	Carlton	35	11	0	5	79	45	124	31	21	0.0	0.5	7.2	4.1	11.3	2.8	1.9	3
1990	Carlton	35	17	2	0	175	83	258	70	18	0.1	0.0	10.3	4.9	15.2	4.1	1.1	0
1991	Carlton	35	22	0	0	178	147	325	82	29	0.0	0.0	8.1	6.7	14.8	3.7	1.3	11
1992	Carlton	35	19	6	0	139	105	244	52	25	0.3	0.0	7.3	5.5	12.8	2.7	1.3	0
1993	Carlton	35	16	1	3	153	102	255	68	20	0.1	0.2	9.6	6.4	15.9	4.3	1.3	5
1994	Carlton	35	22	1	1	214	118	332	86	40	0.0	0.0	9.7	5.4	15.1	3.9	1.8	3
1995†	Carlton	35	22	6	2	175	124	299	93	27	0.3	0.1	8.0	5.6	13.6	4.2	1.2	4
1996	Carlton	35	8	0	1	47	39	86	24	11	0.0	0.1	5.9	4.9	10.8	3.0	1.4	0
1997	Carlton	35	20	7	1	147	95	242	67	26	0.4	0.1	7.4	4.8	12.1	3.4	1.3	0
1998	Carlton	35	13	5	2	54	38	92	21	10	0.4	0.2	4.2	2.9	7.1	1.6	0.8	0
Career			248	41	26	1946	1332	3278	865	252	0.2	0.1	7.8	5.4	13.2	3.5	1.3	29
