= Matt Clape =

Australian rules footballer

Personal information
- Full name: Matthew Bruce Clape
- Born: 28 May 1969 (age 57)
- Height: 187 cm (6 ft 2 in)
- Weight: 86 kg (190 lb)

Playing career^{1}
Years	Club	Games (Goals)
1988–1994	East Perth	92 (17)
1992–1994	West Coast Eagles	29 (14)
1995–1998	Carlton	58 (48)
Total		179 (79)
- ^{1} Playing statistics correct to the end of 1998.

Career highlights
- Carlton Premiership Team: 1995

Matthew Bruce Clape (born 28 May 1969) is a former Australian rules footballer who played for Carlton and West Coast in the Australian Football League.

Clape got his first chance at AFL football with the West Coast Eagles as a half back flanker but was delisted after three seasons. He was given a second chance by Carlton when they picked him in the 1995 AFL Pre-Season Draft.

In the club's premiership season of 1995, Clape featured prominently. Pushed up forward he kicked 7 straight goals and gathered 17 possessions in a round 15 game against Adelaide at Optus Oval. He played in the Grand Final and starred with 19 disposals. At the end of the year he had kicked 31 goals.

Matt is now a successful business owner living in Perth

== Statistics ==
Legend
G	Goals	K	Kicks	D	Disposals	T	Tackles
B	Behinds	H	Handballs	M	Marks

Season	Team	No.	Games	Totals							Averages (per game)							Votes
Season	Team	No.	Games	G	B	K	H	D	M	T	G	B	K	H	D	M	T	Votes
1992	West Coast	32	9	4	2	73	38	111	25	18	0.4	0.2	8.1	4.2	12.3	2.8	2.0	0
1993	West Coast	32	14	8	8	65	49	114	18	10	0.6	0.6	4.6	3.5	8.1	1.3	0.7	2
1994	West Coast	32	6	2	1	24	11	35	7	3	0.3	0.2	4.0	1.8	5.8	1.2	0.5	0
1995†	Carlton	6	23	31	11	200	119	319	89	20	1.3	0.5	8.7	5.2	13.9	3.9	0.9	9
1996	Carlton	6	17	10	6	128	85	213	45	28	0.6	0.4	7.5	5.0	12.5	2.6	1.6	1
1997	Carlton	6	11	5	6	60	67	127	38	13	0.5	0.5	5.5	6.1	11.5	3.5	1.2	0
1998	Carlton	6	7	2	1	36	14	50	17	2	0.3	0.1	5.1	2.0	7.1	2.4	0.3	0
Career			87	62	35	586	383	969	239	94	0.7	0.4	6.7	4.4	11.1	2.7	1.1	12
