= Craig Bradley =

Australian rules footballer, born 1963

Personal information
- Full name: Craig Edwin Bradley
- Born: 23 October 1963 (age 63); Ashford, South Australia
- Height: 180 cm (5 ft 11 in)
- Weight: 81 kg (179 lb)
- Position: Midfielder

Playing career^{1}
Years	Club	Games (Goals)
1981–1985	Port Adelaide (SANFL)	89 (97)
1986–2002	Carlton (VFL/AFL)	375 (247)
Total		464 (344)

Representative team honours
Years	Team	Games (Goals)
1983–1999	South Australia	19 (?)

International team honours
1984–2002	Australia	9 (?)
- ^{1} Playing statistics correct to the end of 2002.

Career highlights
- VFL/AFL: 4× All-Australian team: 1993, 1994, 1995, 1997; 3× Carlton Best and Fairest: 1986, 1988, 1993; 2× VFL/AFL premiership player: 1987, 1995; Michael Tuck Medal: 1997; Carlton games record holder: (375); Carlton Captain: 1998–2001; Carlton Hall of Fame: Legend Status; Carlton Team of the Century – wing; SANFL: 3× Port Adelaide Best and Fairest: 1982, 1984, 1985; SANFL premiership: 1981; South Australian Football Hall of Fame; Port Adelaide Greatest Team – wing; Representative: 2× National Football Carnival Championship player: 1988, 1993; 3× All-Australian team: 1983, 1985, 1986; 4× Fos Williams Medal: 1985, 1986, 1991, 1993; Simpson Medal: 1985; South Australia captain; Overall: Australian Football Hall of Fame; Elite Australian rules football games record holder (464)

Craig Edwin Bradley (born 23 October 1963) is a former Australian rules footballer and first-class cricketer. He is the games record holder at Carlton in the AFL/VFL, and in elite Australian rules football (the AFL/VFL, SANFL and WAFL).

== Early life ==
Bradley was born in Ashford in suburban Adelaide. His junior club was the Pooraka Bulls (see Adelaide Footy League).

== Football ==
=== Port Adelaide (1981–1985) ===
Bradley made his senior football debut in 1981 as a seventeen-year-old for Port Adelaide in the South Australian National Football League (SANFL), Port's third premiership in a row. At the end of 1981 Victorian Football League club Essendon approached Bradley to join them but he turned down the offer, wishing to remain in South Australia with Port Adelaide and to build on his promising cricket career.

In 1982, his second season, Bradley won Port Adelaide's Best and Fairest.

In 1984 Bradley would be selected in the Australian team to take on Ireland in the revival of the International Rules series.

In 1985 Bradley had won his third consecutive Port Adelaide best and fairest and was runner-up for the Magarey Medal.

=== Carlton (1986–2002) ===
After 89 games with Port Adelaide, Bradley was recruited by VFL club Carlton in 1986 as part of a recruiting drive that also netted future captain Stephen Kernahan and Peter Motley.

Bradley won three Robert Reynolds Trophies as Carlton's Best & Fairest, in 1986, 1988 and 1993, as well as being a member of the 1987 and 1995 premiership sides. Bradley played with Carlton for seventeen seasons, acting as Kernahan's vice captain from 1990 until 1997, then captaining Carlton from 1998 to 2001.

In this time, Bradley also represented Australia three times in the International Rules series, including as vice-captain in 2000 and captain in 2001. He broke Bruce Doull's Carlton games record in Round 1, 2002.

In a senior career spanning 22 seasons, Bradley was renowned as one of the games tireless champions, and in particular his amazing fitness that meant he could play the physically demanding game of Australian rules football until the age of 38. For much of his career, Bradley played as an outside midfielder, rotating into the forward line during games, where his nous allowed him both to score and assist many goals through his career. In his final few seasons, Bradley spent more time acting as a loose, sweeping half-back flanker, and much of Carlton's drive forward came from his play through the wings.

Bradley's final AFL game, against Port Adelaide, was in Round 19, 2002, polling 3 Brownlow Votes at the age of 38 years and 289 days, making him the sixth-oldest player in the history of the league. His final appearance overall was in the 2002 International Rules series.

In November 2002, following Carlton's salary cap breach which lost the club valuable draft picks, Bradley had contemplated reversing his decision to retire and attempt to rebuild a club in crisis, but he eventually stood by his initial decision to retire from the game, which was made three weeks before the salary cap drama occurred.

== Cricket ==
Bradley played first-class cricket for South Australia and various Australian junior sides. After moving to Victoria to play for Carlton, he initially continued to play cricket for Victoria, although the increasing demands of football led him to retire from cricket after four first-class games.

He played grade cricket for Port Adelaide until 1987/88 (originally returning to South Australia each summer after the football season to do so), and from 1988/89 until his retirement from cricket after the 1991/92 season, he played district cricket in Victoria for the Melbourne Cricket Club. Bradley holds the distinction as the last active VFL/AFL player to win a Victorian district cricket premiership, achieving the feat in 1988/89, and had an agreement with the Carlton Football Club that district cricket finals took precedence over early season home-and-away football games if there was a clash.

== Post-football ==
In 2007, Bradley returned to Carlton as a part-time assistant coach.

== Honours ==
Bradley's services to the game have been officially recognised several times at the highest levels. He was immediately inducted into the Australian Football Hall of Fame in 2006, after the minimum three years of retirement. At Carlton, Bradley is an Official Legend of the club's Hall of Fame, and was selected on the wing in the club's Team of the Century. He was also selected on the wing in Port Adelaide's Team of the Century.

Craig Bradley was an Australian rules footballer who played 464 premiership matches: 89 for Port Adelaide in the SANFL from 1981 to 1985 (despite missing the last six matches of the 1983 season touring England with the Young Australia cricket team) and 375 for Carlton in the VFL/AFL from 1986 to 2002, including 31 finals (7 for Port Adelaide and 24 for Carlton).

He holds the Carlton club games record, and at the time of his retirement, ranked fourth for most games played in the VFL/AFL behind Simon Madden (378), Kevin Bartlett (403) and Michael Tuck (426). As of the 2025 Grand Final, he is ranked 11th.

== Other matches ==
Bradley also played 36 pre-season/night series matches - nine for Port Adelaide and 27 for Carlton (these are counted as senior by the SANFL but not by the VFL/AFL) - as well as 19 State of Origin matches for South Australia from 1983 to 1999, and nine International Rules matches for Australia. If these are included, then Bradley played a total of 528 senior career games.

The VFL/AFL list Bradley's total as 501 career senior games, excluding his pre-season/night series matches for Carlton.

Depending on the viewpoint taken, Bradley's 500th senior career game was either the first International Rules test against Ireland at Croke Park in 2002 (using the VFL/AFL's total) or against St Kilda in Round 20 of 2001 at the Docklands Stadium (using Bradley's overall total).

Regardless of these differing viewpoints, Bradley is the all-time career senior games record holder in elite Australian rules football.

== Statistics ==
Legend
G	Goals	K	Kicks	D	Disposals	T	Tackles
B	Behinds	H	Handballs	M	Marks

Season	Team	No.	Games	Totals							Averages (per game)							Votes
Season	Team	No.	Games	G	B	K	H	D	M	T	G	B	K	H	D	M	T	Votes
1986	Carlton	21	25	30	12	386	215	601	145	—N/a	1.2	0.5	15.4	8.6	24.0	5.8	—N/a	9
1987†	Carlton	21	22	17	16	378	124	502	92	29	0.8	0.7	17.2	5.6	22.8	4.2	1.3	14
1988	Carlton	21	25	14	15	475	127	602	91	30	0.6	0.6	19.0	5.1	24.1	3.6	1.2	2
1989	Carlton	21	21	16	12	320	128	448	68	32	0.8	0.6	15.2	6.1	21.3	3.2	1.5	8
1990	Carlton	21	22	10	12	373	184	557	58	44	0.5	0.5	17.0	8.4	25.3	2.6	2.0	6
1991	Carlton	21	21	9	7	359	162	521	52	41	0.4	0.3	17.1	7.7	24.8	2.5	1.6	6
1992	Carlton	21	22	17	15	287	198	485	64	35	0.8	0.7	13.0	9.0	22.0	2.9	1.6	4
1993	Carlton	21	22	26	20	332	228	560	85	45	1.2	0.9	15.1	10.4	25.5	3.9	2.0	6
1994	Carlton	21	21	15	13	285	188	473	59	35	0.7	0.6	13.6	9.0	22.5	2.8	1.7	4
1995†	Carlton	21	25	12	12	373	211	584	100	30	0.5	0.5	14.9	8.4	23.4	4.0	1.2	10
1996	Carlton	21	19	17	10	314	137	451	66	36	0.9	0.5	16.5	7.2	23.7	3.5	1.9	6
1997	Carlton	21	22	12	11	436	151	587	76	32	0.5	0.5	19.8	6.9	26.7	3.5	1.5	15
1998	Carlton	21	19	7	9	267	160	427	62	28	0.4	0.5	14.1	8.4	22.5	3.3	1.5	10
1999	Carlton	21	26	9	11	430	196	626	96	35	0.3	0.4	16.5	7.5	24.1	3.7	1.3	18
2000	Carlton	21	21	15	2	281	168	449	51	34	0.7	0.1	13.4	8.0	21.4	2.4	1.6	12
2001	Carlton	21	23	14	7	344	177	521	94	24	0.6	0.3	15.0	7.7	22.6	4.1	1.0	10
2002	Carlton	21	19	7	8	236	146	382	58	36	0.4	0.4	12.4	7.7	20.1	3.1	1.9	4
Career			375	247	192	5876	2900	8776	1317	546	0.7	0.5	15.7	7.7	23.4	3.5	1.6	144

== See also ==
- List of Victoria first-class cricketers
- List of South Australian representative cricketers
- List of Australian rules football and cricket players
