= Brad Pearce (footballer) =

Australian rules footballer

Personal information
- Born: 16 August 1971 (age 55); Springvale, Victoria
- Original team: St Kilda Under-19s
- Debut: Round 19, 1993, Brisbane vs. West Coast, at The Gabba

Playing career^{1}
Years	Club	Games (Goals)
1993	Brisbane Bears	2 (1)
1994–1999	Carlton	77 (151)
Total		79 (152)
- ^{1} Playing statistics correct to the end of 1999.

Career highlights
- Carlton Premiership Team: 1995

Brad Pearce (born 16 August 1971) is a former Australian rules footballer who played for Carlton and the Brisbane Bears in the Australian Football League (AFL).

Pearce played both football and cricket as a junior, and after having focussed on cricket in 1987, where he played for the Victorian schoolboy team he returned to football in 1988 as part of the St Kilda junior system, playing in the Victorian Under-17 Teal Cup team. He played with the St Kilda minor grades from 1988 until 1990, but injuries interrupted his progress to the senior grade for the club.

In 1992, Pearce played in the TFL Statewide League for the South Launceston Football Club, where impressive performances in the forward-line attracted the attention of AFL recruiters. He was drafted by the Brisbane Bears in the 1992 mid-season draft, and played two senior matches in 1993 before a nasty groin injury led to his delisting at the end of the season.

Pearce was then recruited by Carlton with its second-round selection in the 1994 pre-season draft. He played only two senior games in his first season, before enjoying a break-out season in 1995, at the age of 24. Playing as a fast-leading forward pocket, Pearce provided Carlton's forward-line with variety and an alternative avenue to goal to long-time full forward Stephen Kernahan, and he played 23 of 25 possible games for the season, kicked 52 goals, and kicked four goals in Carlton's Grand Final victory against Geelong.

Pearce played for Carlton for a further four seasons, playing an average of thirteen games per season interrupted by a range of injuries, including a ruptured patella. He retired at the end of the 1999 AFL season, having played 77 games and kicking 151 goals over six seasons for Carlton. Had it not been for injuries, Pearce's legacy would have been much greater. Carlton fans though, hold him in great esteem as he was the speed that was required for the 1995 flag that the club was lacking.

== Statistics ==
Legend
G	Goals	K	Kicks	D	Disposals	T	Tackles
B	Behinds	H	Handballs	M	Marks

Season	Team	No.	Games	Totals							Averages (per game)							Votes
Season	Team	No.	Games	G	B	K	H	D	M	T	G	B	K	H	D	M	T	Votes
1993	Brisbane Bears	13	2	1	1	6	3	9	1	0	0.5	0.5	3.0	1.5	4.5	0.5	0.0	0
1994	Carlton	19	2	0	1	6	2	8	4	0	0.0	0.5	3.0	1.0	4.0	2.0	0.0	0
1995†	Carlton	19	23	52	40	205	50	255	104	26	2.3	1.7	8.9	2.2	11.1	4.5	1.1	4
1996	Carlton	19	15	35	24	115	26	141	58	12	2.3	1.6	7.7	1.7	9.4	3.9	0.8	0
1997	Carlton	19	11	16	14	84	16	100	44	7	1.5	1.3	7.6	1.5	9.1	4.0	0.6	0
1998	Carlton	19	14	32	22	110	17	127	51	7	2.3	1.6	7.9	1.2	9.1	3.6	0.5	2
1999	Carlton	19	12	16	12	60	10	70	38	5	1.3	1.0	5.0	0.8	5.8	3.2	0.4	0
Career			79	152	114	586	124	710	300	57	1.9	1.4	7.4	1.6	9.0	3.8	0.7	6
