= Mil Hanna =

Australian rules footballer

Personal information
- Full name: Milham Hanna
- Born: 5 April 1966 (age 60); Qantara, Lebanon
- Original teams: East Brunswick, Victoria, Australia
- Height: 186 cm (6 ft 1 in)
- Weight: 92 kg (203 lb)

Playing career^{1}
Years	Club	Games (Goals)
1986–1997	Carlton	190 (83)
- ^{1} Playing statistics correct to the end of 1997.

Career highlights
- All-Australian team: 1992; Premiership player: 1995

Milham Hanna (born 5 April 1966) is a former Australian rules footballer best known for his playing career with the Carlton Football Club in the 1980s and 1990s.

Nicknamed The Cranium (after his cleanly shaven head, due to alopecia) or simply Mil for short, Hanna is distinguished as having been the first Lebanese-born player in the history of the Victorian Football League/Australian Football League (VFL/AFL). and the only AFL player of Lebanese descent until the debut of Bachar Houli in 2007.

Born in Qantara, Lebanon to a Maronite family, Hanna grew up in the inner-northern suburbs of Melbourne, where he played his junior football in Brunswick East. He was educated at East Brunswick High and Strathmore Secondary College.

He was known in the VFL/AFL for his athletic physique and fast pace playing as a tall running wingman.

Hanna made his senior playing debut in 1986, but ruptured his anterior cruciate ligament during his first game. Following almost a year of rehabilitation, he enjoyed a largely injury-free career with Carlton.

Hanna played in two AFL Grand Finals for Carlton: in the 1993 losing side and Carlton's premiership-winning team in 1995. He was selected as a member of the All-Australian team in 1992.

After being delisted by Carlton, he trained with Richmond, but was unable to be drafted by them due to Richmond being banned from participating in the 1998 pre-season draft due to them exceeding the salary cap in 1997.

Hanna was inducted into Carlton's Hall of Fame in 2016.

== Statistics ==
Legend
G	Goals	K	Kicks	D	Disposals	T	Tackles
B	Behinds	H	Handballs	M	Marks

Season	Team	No.	Games	Totals							Averages (per game)							Votes
Season	Team	No.	Games	G	B	K	H	D	M	T	G	B	K	H	D	M	T	Votes
1986	Carlton	47	1	0	1	1	0	1	1	—N/a	0.0	1.0	1.0	0.0	1.0	1.0	—N/a	0
1987	Carlton	13	8	9	6	51	19	70	11	6	1.1	0.8	6.4	2.4	8.8	1.4	0.8	0
1988	Carlton	13	16	3	8	111	38	149	37	6	0.2	0.5	6.9	2.4	9.3	2.3	0.4	0
1989	Carlton	13	20	4	7	254	101	355	97	31	0.2	0.4	12.7	5.1	17.8	4.9	1.6	9
1990	Carlton	13	20	4	6	246	121	367	96	28	0.2	0.3	12.3	6.1	18.4	4.8	1.4	3
1991	Carlton	13	21	23	21	217	142	359	82	24	1.1	1.0	10.3	6.8	17.1	3.9	1.1	6
1992	Carlton	13	22	4	3	253	102	355	86	32	0.2	0.1	11.5	4.6	16.1	3.9	1.5	6
1993	Carlton	13	20	2	10	232	123	355	79	24	0.1	0.5	11.6	6.2	17.8	4.0	1.2	4
1994	Carlton	13	23	15	12	249	165	414	112	23	0.7	0.5	10.8	7.2	18.0	4.9	1.0	6
1995†	Carlton	13	21	14	11	261	122	383	117	18	0.7	0.5	12.4	5.8	18.2	5.6	0.9	7
1996	Carlton	13	10	3	2	103	50	153	51	13	0.3	0.2	10.3	5.0	15.3	5.1	1.3	0
1997	Carlton	13	8	2	1	56	27	83	29	6	0.3	0.1	7.0	3.4	10.4	3.6	0.8	0
Career			190	83	88	2034	1010	3044	798	211	0.4	0.5	10.7	5.3	16.0	4.2	1.1	41
