= Qantara, Akkar =

Village in Akkar District, Lebanon

Qantara قنطرة
- village
- Location within Lebanon
- Coordinates: 34°31′07″N 36°04′16″E
- Country: Lebanon
- Governorate: Akkar
- District: Akkar

Area
  - Total: 1.91 km^{2} (0.74 sq mi)
- Elevation: 230 m (750 ft)

Population (2009)
  - Total: 761 eligible voters
  - Density: 398/km^{2} (1,030/sq mi)
- Time zone: UTC+2 (EET)
  - Summer (DST): UTC+3 (EEST)
- Dialing code: +961

Qantara (Arabic: قنطرة, romanized: Qanṭarah) is a village in Akkar Governorate, Lebanon.

The population is mostly Sunni Muslim and Maronites.

== History ==
In 1838, Eli Smith observed that the place was called el-Kantarah and was situated to the west of esh-Sheikh Mohammed. The population consisted of Maronites.

== Bibliography ==
- Robinson, E.; Smith, E. (1841). Biblical Researches in Palestine, Mount Sinai and Arabia Petraea: A Journal of Travels in the year 1838. Vol. 3. Boston: Crocker & Brewster.
