= Adrian Whitehead =

Australian rules footballer

Personal information
- Full name: Adrian Whitehead
- Born: 25 August 1975 (age 51)
- Original teams: Federal, Wodonga
- Height: 178 cm (5 ft 10 in)
- Weight: 81 kg (179 lb)

Playing career^{1}
Years	Club	Games (Goals)
1994–1999	Carlton	63 (22)
- ^{1} Playing statistics correct to the end of 1999.

Career highlights
- AFL Rising Star nominee: 1995; 1995 AFL Premiership Player

Adrian Whitehead (born 25 August 1975) is a former Australian rules footballer who played for Carlton.

Whitehead, originally from Federal in the Upper Murray Football League where he won the 1990 UMFL Under 16's best and fairest award, then won the 1992 Ovens & Murray Football League Rookie of the Year award, while playing for Wodonga.

Whirehead made his debut for Carlton in round three, 1994. A defender, he was the youngest member of the club's premiership winning side of 1995, playing in every game.

Whitehead started to suffer from a foot injury during the 1996 pre-season. It flared up against Geelong late in 1997 and he was forced off the ground injured. He had damaged the nerves and tendons in his foot and did not play in the 1998 AFL season. Whitehead's last game came in round 13 the following season and he was delisted afterwards, going on to coach the Wodonga Raiders.

In 2001, Whitehead sued Carlton Football Club for damages from a pain-killing injection their doctor gave him in a game in the 1997 season. It was alleged that the injection made him unable to protect his foot during the game which resulted in ruptured tendons, nerve damage and bone fractures. The case went to the Supreme Court and in 2005 a verdict was handed down. It was decided that although Whitehead was entitled to compensation he was not owed any from Carlton. Whitehead was advised to seek a settlement through the Workers Compensation Act.

== Statistics ==
Legend
G	Goals	K	Kicks	D	Disposals	T	Tackles
B	Behinds	H	Handballs	M	Marks

Season	Team	No.	Games	Totals							Averages (per game)						
Season	Team	No.	Games	G	B	K	H	D	M	T	G	B	K	H	D	M	T
1994	Carlton	32	8	0	3	30	31	61	8	3	0.0	0.4	3.8	3.9	7.6	1.0	0.4
1995†	Carlton	32	25	4	8	177	128	305	42	25	0.2	0.3	7.1	5.1	12.2	1.7	1.0
1996	Carlton	32	16	6	6	96	104	200	31	13	0.4	0.4	6.0	6.5	12.5	1.9	0.8
1997	Carlton	32	13	12	11	106	79	185	38	12	0.9	0.8	8.2	6.1	14.2	2.9	0.9
1998	Carlton	32	0	—	—	—	—	—	—	—	—	—	—	—	—	—	—
1999	Carlton	32	1	0	0	1	6	7	0	1	0.0	0.0	1.0	6.0	7.0	0.0	1.0
Career			63	22	28	410	348	758	119	54	0.3	0.4	6.5	5.5	12.0	1.9	0.9
