= Stephen Kernahan =

Australian rules footballer (born 1963)

Personal information
- Full name: Stephen Scott Kernahan
- Nicknames: Sticks, Corey
- Born: 1 September 1963 (age 63); Adelaide, South Australia
- Original team: Glenelg (SANFL)
- Height: 196 cm (6 ft 5 in)
- Weight: 102 kg (225 lb)
- Positions: Centre half-forward, Ruckman

Playing career^{1}
Years	Club	Games (Goals)
1981–1985	Glenelg	116 (266)
1986–1997	Carlton	251 (738)
Total		367 (1004)

Representative team honours
Years	Team	Games (Goals)
1983–1996	South Australia	16 (66)
- ^{1} Playing statistics correct to the end of 1997.

Career highlights
- VFL/AFL: 2× AFL Premiership player: (1987, 1995); 2× All-Australian team: (1992, 1994); 3× Robert Reynolds Trophy: (1987, 1989, 1992); 11× Carlton leading goalkicker: (1986, 1987, 1988, 1989, 1990, 1991, 1992, 1993, 1994, 1995, 1996); Carlton captain: (1987–1997); Carlton Team of the Century – Centre Half-Forward, (Captain); Carlton Hall of Fame, Legend Status; SANFL: SANFL Premiership player: (1985); 3× Glenelg Best & Fairest: (1983, 1984, 1985); 2× Glenelg Leading Goalkicker: (1983, 1984); Jack Oatey Medal: (1985); South Australian Football Hall of Fame, inducted 2002; Glenelg Hall of Fame; Representative: 2× National Football Carnival Championship: 1988, 1993; 3× All-Australian team: (1985, 1986, 1988); 2× Fos Williams Medal: (1984, 1988); Overall: Australian Football Hall of Fame, inducted 2001

Stephen Scott Kernahan (born 1 September 1963) is a former Australian rules footballer who played for the Carlton Football Club in the Australian Football League (AFL) and for the Glenelg Football Club in the South Australian National Football League (SANFL). He also played 16 State of Origin games for South Australia and gained selection as an All-Australian five times (1983, 1986, 1988, 1992 and 1994). He later served for six years as president of the Carlton Football Club.

Nicknamed Sticks, Kernahan was the captain of Carlton's Team of the Century and holds the club goalkicking record of 738. He held the AFL record for the most games as a club captain until passed by Joel Selwood in 2022.

== Early life ==
Stephen Kernahan is the son of South Australian football legend and Glenelg club champion and administrator Harry Kernahan, and the older brother of former Glenelg and Carlton player David Kernahan. Kernahan attended Paringa Park Primary School in North Brighton and Brighton High School. At a junior level, he represented South Australia in cricket and surf life-saving in addition to football. He became a licensed stockbroker and worked at the stock exchanges in Adelaide and then Melbourne throughout his football career.

His affiliation with Glenelg began very young; he developed a lifelong friendship with Chris McDermott when they played together in the under-10s team.

== Playing career ==
=== Glenelg ===
He began his senior career with Glenelg in the South Australian National Football League (SANFL) at age 17 in 1981, and played 116 games, kicking 266 goals (also playing 20 games and kicking 24 goals in night series/pre-season competition), and also won three straight best and fairest awards.

Under the coaching of 1961 Magarey Medallist John Halbert, Kernahan was a member of Glenelg's losing Grand Final teams to Port Adelaide in 1981 and Norwood in 1982.

In 1983, he topped the voting in the Magarey Medal with a then-record 44 votes, made all the more remarkable as Glenelg only won 9 of 22 games for the season (after losing their first 8 games), half the number won by premiers West Adelaide. Unfortunately, he was ineligible due to being reported for an incident with Norwood's Garry McIntosh in Round 4 and was suspended for Round 5. Due to the rules of the SANFL, any player who receives a suspension during a season is ineligible to win the Medal and the award was won by North Adelaide's Tony Antrobus who polled 35 votes. Kernahan was also twice leading goal kicker for The Bays, in 1983 and 1984 and in 1985 he was awarded the Jack Oatey Medal as best on the ground in the club's premiership win over North Adelaide.

In his days with Glenelg, Kernahan was mostly used as a ruckman/forward due to his 6 ft 5 in (196 cm) height and his strong marking and leading ability. He played mostly at full-forward and was the Tigers' second ruckman behind Bays legend Peter Carey. This would lead him to be Glenelg's leading goalkicker in both 1983 and 1984. His height and his slight build led to the nickname "Sticks".

Kernahan was signed by Carlton in the Victorian Football League (VFL) in 1981, but he didn't move to the club until 1986 due to his ambition to play in a premiership with his best mates at Glenelg. The anticipation of Kernahan's arrival was heightened when he played State of Origin games for South Australia and his outstanding play, usually at full-forward, saw those in Victoria take notice. In 1983, Kernahan was a member of the South Australian side which defeated Victoria in Adelaide for the first time in 18 years. He kicked 10 goals in a losing side against Victoria at Football Park in Adelaide in 1984, winning the Fos Williams Medal as South Australia's player of the match. He was a mainstay of the South Australian state of origin teams throughout his careers at Glenelg and Carlton, playing a total of sixteen games for the Croweaters, winning a second Fos Williams Medal in 1988, and captaining the team in 1996.

=== Carlton ===
After winning the 1985 premiership with Glenelg, Kernahan finally moved to Melbourne to join Carlton in 1986, the same year as two other quality South Australian players, Craig Bradley from Port Adelaide and Peter Motley from Sturt, joined the Blues, and the three were immediately influential for the Blues. Playing primarily at centre half-forward—and sometimes at full-forward—throughout his career, Kernahan kicked 62 goals in his first season at Carlton, to be the club's leading goalkicker for the first of a club record eleven consecutive occasions.

In only his second season at the club, Kernahan was made club captain. He became widely regarded for his leadership as captain, with former club chief executive Ian Collins describing him as "on and off the field, the greatest leader [Carlton] has ever had". He held the captaincy for eleven years until his retirement, and his 226 games as captain is a VFL/AFL record for any club. In the final round of the 1987 season, he famously kicked a goal after the final siren to defeat North Melbourne and clinch the minor premiership and the bye in the first week of the finals, and Carlton went on from that position to win the Grand Final against Hawthorn and its 15th premiership. Kernahan won his first of three club best and fairest awards that season. Prior to the 1991 season, Kernahan was offered a large sum of money to join the newly established Adelaide Crows, which would be coached by his former premiership coach Graham Cornes, but Kernahan remained loyal to Carlton.

In Round 2, 1993, against Essendon, Kernahan had another shot after the siren to win the game. As the scores were level, he only needed a behind or better to win the game. After taking a strong pack mark, Kernahan heard the siren go, steadied himself, and took two steps inside the 50-metre arc from about a 20-degree angle on the right forward flank. Unfortunately for Kernahan, he shanked the kick to the right, infamously kicking the ball out of bounds on the full, resulting in a drawn game. Kernahan said of the moment a decade on, "I was a good kick when I was young. I could kick goals, no problem," Kernahan said. "But by '93, I was a worse kick than in the '80s. I'd had groins, my kicking had gone off. Kerhahan made amends for his miss the round after, kicking a late-game winner against Hawthorn.

Kernahan won another two club best and fairest awards in 1989 and 1992, and he continued to win the club goalkicking annually, with his highest total of 83 goals coming in 1992. He was selected in the All-Australian team in 1992 and 1994. He led Carlton to the 1993 Grand Final against Essendon, which the club lost badly despite Kernahan's seven goals. Two years later, Kernahan led the club to the 1995 premiership, kicking five goals in the Grand Final against Geelong.

Kernahan retired at the end of the 1997 season. In that year, he passed Harry Vallence to become the leading career goalkicker in Carlton Football Club history; he finished his VFL/AFL career with 738 goals, which remains a Carlton record as of the end of 2025.

Overall, Kernahan played a total of 367 premiership games for Glenelg and Carlton, and kicked 1004 goals, which is the 13th most in elite Australian rules football.

== Honours ==
He was selected as an All-Australian five times: three times when the team was selected based on interstate carnival performances (1985, 1986 and 1988) and twice when the team was selected based on AFL performances (1992 and 1994). He is a Carlton and AFL life member, and he has been inducted into the Australian Football Hall of Fame and the South Australian Football Hall of Fame.

Kernahan is regarded as one of the greatest players in Carlton Football Club history. He was centre half-forward and captain of the club's Team of the Century, he was made a Legend of the Carlton Football Club Hall of Fame in 1997, and as part of the club's sesquicentennial celebrations in 2014 he was named the second-greatest player in the club's history, behind only John Nicholls.

== Sports administration career ==
=== Carlton Football Club president ===
After retiring as a player, Kernahan joined the Carlton Football Club's board of directors, and in 2006 became a vice-president of the club. Following Graham Smorgon's failure to be re-elected at the 2007 Board Elections, Kernahan was made interim president, acquiring the services of and relinquishing the position to Richard Pratt within days. On 20 June 2008, he again took the role of president, this time permanently, after Pratt stood aside to fight charges of giving false and misleading evidence to an Australian Competition & Consumer Commission. Kernahan served as president for six years before stepping aside in June 2014. Kernahan then handed over his position as president of the club to Mark LoGiudice.

== Publishing career ==
Kernahan also had a post-football career in publishing in Melbourne.

== Statistics ==
Legend
G	Goals	K	Kicks	D	Disposals	T	Tackles
B	Behinds	H	Handballs	M	Marks	H/O	Hit-outs

Season	Team	No.	Games	Totals								Averages (per game)								Votes
Season	Team	No.	Games	G	B	K	H	D	M	T	H/O	G	B	K	H	D	M	T	H/O	Votes
1986	Carlton	4	25	62	27	233	95	328	157	—N/a	60	2.5	1.1	9.3	3.8	13.1	6.3	—N/a	2.4	1
1987†	Carlton	4	24	73	50	275	89	364	177	41	33	3.0	2.1	11.5	3.7	15.2	7.4	1.7	1.4	14
1988	Carlton	4	23	54	36	288	71	359	161	28	30	2.3	1.6	12.5	3.1	15.6	7.0	1.2	1.3	3
1989	Carlton	4	22	59	40	298	64	362	180	28	39	2.7	1.8	13.5	2.9	16.5	8.2	1.3	1.8	9
1990	Carlton	4	22	69	42	254	58	312	165	36	42	3.1	1.9	11.5	2.6	14.2	7.5	1.6	1.9	4
1991	Carlton	4	20	46	36	234	57	291	149	36	36	2.3	1.8	11.7	2.9	14.6	7.5	1.8	1.8	6
1992	Carlton	4	22	83	50	278	74	352	165	20	76	3.8	2.3	12.6	3.4	16.0	7.5	0.9	3.5	8
1993	Carlton	4	18	68	42	216	57	273	140	23	30	3.8	2.3	12.0	3.2	15.2	7.8	1.3	1.7	8
1994	Carlton	4	23	82	51	237	96	333	160	24	49	3.6	2.2	10.3	4.2	14.5	7.0	1.0	2.1	5
1995†	Carlton	4	17	63	40	172	42	214	121	18	16	3.7	2.4	10.1	2.5	12.6	7.1	1.1	0.9	8
1996	Carlton	4	19	56	34	172	36	208	108	13	15	2.9	1.8	9.0	1.9	10.9	5.7	0.7	0.8	1
1997	Carlton	4	16	23	23	146	36	182	76	17	20	1.4	1.4	9.1	2.3	11.4	4.8	1.1	1.3	0
Career			251	738	471	2803	775	3578	1759	284	446	2.9	1.9	11.2	3.1	14.3	7.0	1.3	1.8	67
