= David Parkin =

Australian rules footballer (born 1942)

David Parkin OAM

Personal information
- Full name: David Alexander Parkin
- Born: 12 September 1942 (age 84)
- Original team: Melbourne High School
- Height: 180 cm (5 ft 11 in)
- Weight: 80 kg (176 lb)

Playing career^{1}
Years	Club	Games (Goals)
1961–1974	Hawthorn	211 (21)
1975	Subiaco	8 (2)
Total		219 (23)

Representative team honours
Years	Team	Games (Goals)
	Victoria	5 (?)

Coaching career^{3}
Years	Club	Games (W–L–D)
1977–1980	Hawthorn	94 (57–37–0)
1981–1985	Carlton	120 (79–40–1)
1986–1988	Fitzroy	69 (30–39–0)
1991–2000	Carlton	235 (140–94–1)
Total		518 (306–210–2)
- ^{1} Playing statistics correct to the end of 1974.^{3} Coaching statistics correct as of 2000.

Career highlights
- VFL Premiership player: (1971); 4× VFL/AFL Premiership coach: (1978), (1981), (1982), (1995); J.J. Dennis Memorial Trophy: (1965); Hawthorn captain: (1969–1973); Subiaco captain: (1975); 4× Jock McHale Medal: (1978, 1981, 1982, 1995); All-Australian team: (1995); VFL Team of the Year: 1982; AFC Night Series premiership: 1977; Carlton Team of the Century; Australian Football Hall of Fame, inducted 2002; Hawthorn Football Club Hall of Fame – Legend status; Carlton Football Club Hall of Fame – Legend status; Sport Australia Hall of Fame, inducted 2010; AFLCA Coaching Legend Award: 2012

David Alexander Parkin (born 12 September 1942) is a former Australian rules footballer and coach who played for the Hawthorn Football Club in the Victorian Football League (VFL) and for the Subiaco Football Club in the Western Australian National Football League (WANFL).

However, Parkin's stature in the history of Australian rules football is based mainly on his achievements as a coach. Building on his experience as a player and educator, Parkin won four premierships (one at Hawthorn, three at Carlton) and is considered one of the most influential coaches of the modern era.

== Pre-football career ==
Parkin attended Hawthorn West Primary School, the birthplace of his passion for Australian rules football. He completed his secondary education at Melbourne High School; during his time there he was the school vice-captain and the captain of the football team.

== Playing career ==
=== Hawthorn ===
Parkin was a tough back-pocket player who played 211 games for the Hawthorn Football Club (and kicked 21 goals) in a career spanning from 1961 to 1974. He won the Best and Fairest award for Hawthorn in 1965, and was captain of the club from 1969 to 1973, including Hawthorn's 1971 premiership winning side. He represented Victoria 5 times at interstate football.

== Coaching career ==
Parkin went to Western Australia and captain-coached Subiaco in 1975. He was back at Hawthorn as Assistant coach under senior coach John Kennedy in 1976. Kennedy retired at the end of 1976 and Parkin was promoted to senior coach.

=== Hawthorn Football Club senior coach (1977–1980) ===
Parkin replaced John Kennedy as Hawthorn Football Club senior coach after Kennedy stepped down. Parkin was senior coach with Hawthorn from 1977 to 1980 and became the second person to coach Hawthorn to a premiership in 1978. However, The Hawks under Parkin in the 1980 season had a disappointing season, where they finished in eight place and therefore missed out of the finals. After finding out that Hawthorn were looking around at other possible coaches to replace him, Parkin penned his letter of resignation as Hawthorn Football Club senior coach at the end of the 1980 season and hand delivered it into Glenferrie Oval. Parkin was then replaced by Allan Jeans as Hawthorn Football Club senior coach.

=== Carlton Football Club senior coach (1981–1985) ===
Parkin then replaced Peter Jones as senior coach of Carlton Football Club, at the end of the 1980 season. and coached Carlton in his first stint from 1981 to 1985 and winning back to back premierships. Firstly in 1981, when Parkin guided Carlton to a premiership victory against Collingwood by a margin of 20 points, in Parkin's first year as senior coach of Carlton and again in 1982, when Parkin guided Carlton to another premiership victory for the second straight consecutive year in a row, this time against Richmond by a margin of 18 points. However, Carlton under Parkin in the 1985 season fell short of expectations and had a disappointing season, where Carlton were eliminated by North Melbourne in the elimination final. Parkin was sacked as Carlton Football Club senior coach at the end of the 1985 season and was replaced by Robert Walls in a jointly announced agreement with Fitzroy Football Club to swap senior coaches for 1986.

=== Fitzroy Football Club senior coach (1986–1988) ===
Parkin then replaced Robert Walls as senior coach of Fitzroy in a jointly announced agreement with Carlton Football Club to swap senior coaches. Parkin then coached Fitzroy from 1986 to 1988. Fitzroy under Parkin made the preliminary final in his first season at the Lions as senior coach, but failed to reach the finals in the following two years. Parkin was sacked by Fitzroy as senior coach at the end of the 1988 season. Parkin was then replaced by Rod Austin as Fitzroy Football Club senior coach.

=== Carlton Football Club senior coach (1991–2000) ===
After Alex Jesaulenko stepped down as Carlton Football Club senior coach at the end of the 1990 season, Carlton President John Elliott offered Parkin the job. Parkin then returned to become the senior coach of Carlton for a second stint from 1991 until 2000. He was named Carlton's Coach of the Century, and is regarded by Carlton supporters as the club's greatest ever coach. During this second stint, Parkin guided Carlton to win the 1995 premiership against Geelong by a margin of 61 points. He also took Carlton to Grand Finals in 1993 and 1999 which they lost to Essendon and North Melbourne, respectively. At the end of the 2000 season Parkin retired as Carlton senior coach and handed the coaching reins to his assistant coach Wayne Brittain.

=== Hawthorn Football Club director of coaching (2001–2002) ===
Parkin then returned to Hawthorn in 2001 as director of coaching under senior coach Peter Schwab, where he continued until 30 October 2002, when he left the club after the end of the 2002 season. In 2003, he wrote a controversial article in the Herald-Sun labeling six Hawthorn players as Mummy's Boys because of their lightweight frames. Parkin believed players should be bigger, heavier and stronger. Three of those he listed, namely Michael Osborne, Rick Ladson and Chance Bateman went on to play in Hawthorn's 2008 Premiership.

== Statistics ==
=== Playing statistics ===
Legend
G	Goals	K	Kicks	D	Disposals	T	Tackles
B	Behinds	H	Handballs	M	Marks

Season	Team	No.	Games	Totals							Averages (per game)							Votes
Season	Team	No.	Games	G	B	K	H	D	M	T	G	B	K	H	D	M	T	Votes
1961	Hawthorn	33	1	0	0	—N/a	—N/a	—N/a	—N/a	—N/a	0.0	0.0	—N/a	—N/a	—N/a	—N/a	—N/a	0
1962	Hawthorn	27	10	3	0	—N/a	—N/a	—N/a	—N/a	—N/a	0.3	0.0	—N/a	—N/a	—N/a	—N/a	—N/a	3
1963	Hawthorn	27	21	0	0	—N/a	—N/a	—N/a	—N/a	—N/a	0.0	0.0	—N/a	—N/a	—N/a	—N/a	—N/a	0
1964	Hawthorn	27	13	2	0	—N/a	—N/a	—N/a	—N/a	—N/a	0.2	0.0	—N/a	—N/a	—N/a	—N/a	—N/a	0
1965	Hawthorn	27	16	0	1	207	11	218	47	—N/a	0.0	0.1	12.9	0.7	13.6	2.9	—N/a	8
1966	Hawthorn	27	14	0	5	205	19	224	43	—N/a	0.0	0.4	14.6	1.4	16.0	3.1	—N/a	4
1967	Hawthorn	27	15	0	0	199	17	216	43	—N/a	0.0	0.0	13.3	1.1	14.4	2.9	—N/a	3
1968	Hawthorn	27	18	3	2	243	14	257	41	—N/a	0.2	0.1	13.5	0.8	14.3	2.3	—N/a	12
1969	Hawthorn	27	14	3	2	209	18	227	26	—N/a	0.2	0.1	14.9	1.3	16.2	1.9	—N/a	0
1970	Hawthorn	27	19	0	0	265	30	295	66	—N/a	0.0	0.0	13.9	1.6	15.5	3.5	—N/a	5
1971^{#}	Hawthorn	27	22	0	0	313	37	350	83	—N/a	0.0	0.0	14.2	1.7	15.9	3.8	—N/a	6
1972	Hawthorn	27	20	0	0	254	33	287	67	—N/a	0.0	0.0	12.7	1.7	14.4	3.4	—N/a	1
1973	Hawthorn	27	15	3	5	210	42	252	47	—N/a	0.2	0.3	14.0	2.8	16.8	3.1	—N/a	9
1974	Hawthorn	27	13	7	8	94	29	123	21	—N/a	0.5	0.6	7.2	2.2	9.5	1.6	—N/a	0
Career			211	21	23	2199	250	2449	484	—N/a	0.1	0.1	13.2	1.5	14.7	2.9	—N/a	51

=== Coaching statistics ===
Legend
W	Wins	L	Losses	D	Draws	W%	Winning percentage	LP	Ladder position	LT	League teams

Season	Team	Games	W	L	D	W %	LP	LT
1977	Hawthorn	25	18	7	0	72.0%	2	12
1978^{#}	Hawthorn	25	19	6	0	76.0%	2	12
1979	Hawthorn	22	10	12	0	45.5%	7	12
1980	Hawthorn	22	10	12	0	45.5%	8	12
1981^{#}	Carlton	24	19	5	0	79.2%	1	12
1982^{#}	Carlton	26	19	6	1	75.0%	3	12
1983	Carlton	23	13	10	0	56.5%	5	12
1984	Carlton	24	13	11	0	54.2%	3	12
1985	Carlton	23	15	8	0	65.2%	4	12
1986	Fitzroy	25	15	10	0	60.0%	4	12
1987	Fitzroy	22	8	14	0	36.4%	11	14
1988	Fitzroy	22	7	15	0	31.8%	12	14
1991	Carlton	22	8	14	0	36.4%	11	15
1992	Carlton	22	14	8	0	63.6%	7	15
1993	Carlton	23	15	7	1	67.4%	2	15
1994	Carlton	24	15	9	0	62.5%	2	15
1995^{#}	Carlton	25	23	2	0	92.0%	1	16
1996	Carlton	24	15	9	0	62.5%	5	16
1997	Carlton	22	10	12	0	45.5%	11	16
1998	Carlton	22	9	13	0	40.9%	11	16
1999	Carlton	26	14	12	0	53.8%	6	16
2000	Carlton	25	17	8	0	68.0%	2	16
Career totals		518	306	210	2	59.27%		

== Honours and achievements ==
=== Playing ===
Team

- VFL premiership player (Hawthorn): 1971
- Minor premiership (Hawthorn): 1971

Individual

- VFL premiership captain: 1971
- J.J. Dennis Memorial Trophy: 1965
- Hawthorn captain: 1969–1973
- Subiaco captain: 1975

=== Coaching ===
Team

- VFL premiership coach (Hawthorn): 1978
- 3× VFL/AFL premiership coach (Carlton): 1981, 1982, 1995
- 2× Minor premiership (Carlton): 1981, 1995
- AFC Night Series premiership (Hawthorn): 1977

Individual

- 4× Jock McHale Medal: 1978, 1981, 1982, 1995
- All-Australian team: 1995
- VFL Team of the Year: 1982
- Victoria Australian rules football team: 1990
- Carlton Team of the Century

=== Hall of Fame/Life membership ===
- Australian Football Hall of Fame
- Hawthorn Hall of Fame – Legend status
- Carlton Hall of Fame
- Hawthorn life member
- Carlton life member

== Post-coaching career ==
Parkin is currently a media commentator who has appeared on Talking Footy on the Seven Network and a commentator for ABC Radio. He was a panellist on Fox Footy's now defunct show, Fox League Teams.

He is a lecturer in Sports and Exercise Science at Deakin University, Melbourne campus. In honour of his significant contribution to Australian society in leadership, sport and education, Deakin University also established the annual David Parkin Oration for Sport and Social Change. He holds a Bachelor of Education from the University of Western Australia.

He was diagnosed with prostate cancer and underwent surgery in March 2009.

== Recognition ==
He received an Australian Sports Medal in 2000 and a Medal of the Order of Australia in 2013. In 2002 he was inducted into the Australian Football Hall of Fame. He was inducted into the Sport Australia Hall of Fame in 2010.
