= Peter Turner (Australian footballer) =

Australian rules footballer

Personal information
- Full name: Peter Turner
- Born: 23 January 1974 (age 52)
- Original team: North Adelaide
- Height: 194 cm (6 ft 4 in)
- Weight: 94 kg (207 lb)
- Position: Key defender

Playing career^{1}
Years	Club	Games (Goals)
1994	Adelaide	3 (1)
1995–1996	Carlton	2 (0)
Total		5 (1)
- ^{1} Playing statistics correct to the end of 1996.

Peter Turner (born 23 January 1974) is a former Australian rules footballer who played with Adelaide and Carlton in the Australian Football League (AFL).
