= David Kernahan =

Australian rules footballer

Personal information
- Born: 11 July 1965 (age 61)
- Original teams: Glenelg, (SANFL)
- Draft: No. 39, 1987 national draft
- Debut: Round 1, 1988, Carlton vs. Hawthorn, at Princes Park
- Height: 188 cm (6 ft 2 in)
- Weight: 90 kg (198 lb)

Playing career^{1}
Years	Club	Games (Goals)
1988–1993	Carlton	53 (8)

Representative team honours
Years	Team	Games (Goals)
	South Australia	? (?)
- ^{1} Playing statistics correct to the end of 1993.

Career highlights
- Carlton Reserves Best Clubman: 1989; Carlton Equal 5th Best and Fairest: 1990; Carlton 5th Best and Fairest: 1991

David Kernahan (born 11 July 1965) is a former Australian rules footballer, who played with Carlton Football Club in the Victorian (VFL) and Australian Football Leagues (AFL), and Glenelg Football Club in the South Australian National Football League (SANFL) in the 1980s and 1990s.

The son of former Glenelg star Harry Kernahan and the younger brother of champion footballer Stephen Kernahan, much was expected of David Kernahan and after playing in two SANFL premierships with Glenelg, Kernahan was taken with pick number 39 in the 1987 VFL Draft by Carlton, which had recruited his brother the year before.

Nicknamed "Dooza", Kernahan made his senior VFL debut with Carlton in Round One, 1988, against Hawthorn Football Club and while he had to undergo a season-ending knee reconstruction soon after, Kernahan returned in 1989 and was awarded the Carlton Reserves "Best Clubman" that year.

Kernahan had his best season in 1990, playing 19 games at full-back and finishing equal fifth in Carlton's Best and Fairest. He enjoyed further good form in 1991, again finishing fifth in the Best and Fairest, before further injuries took toll, playing only seven games in 1992 and one game in 1993.
