= 1995 AFL season =

99th season of the Australian Football League (AFL)

1995 AFL premiership season
- Teams: 16
- Premiers: Carlton; 16th premiership
- Minor premiers: Carlton; 17th minor premiership
- Pre-season cup: North Melbourne; 1st pre-season cup win
- Brownlow Medallist: Paul Kelly (Sydney)
- Leading goalkicker: Gary Ablett (Geelong)

Attendance
- Matches played: 185
- Total attendance: 5,712,693 (30,879 per match)
- Highest: 94,825 (round 4, Collingwood vs. Essendon)

The 1995 AFL season was the 99th season of the Australian Football League (AFL), the highest level senior Australian rules football competition in Australia, which was known as the Victorian Football League until 1989.

The league expanded to sixteen clubs, with the newly established Fremantle Football Club, based in Fremantle, Western Australia, joining the league. The season ran from 31 March until 30 September, and comprised a 22-game home-and-away season followed by a finals series featuring the top eight clubs.

The premiership was won by the Carlton Football Club for the 16th time, after it defeated Geelong by 61 points in the 1995 AFL Grand Final.

== AFL Draft ==
See 1995 AFL draft.

== Ansett Australia Cup ==
North Melbourne defeated Adelaide 14.9 (93) to 8.15 (63) in the final.

== Home-and-away season ==
=== Round 1 ===
Home team	Score	Away team	Score	Venue	Attendance	Date
North Melbourne	11.13 (79)	Adelaide	10.16 (76)	MCG	24,882	Friday, 31 March
Richmond	12.18 (90)	Fremantle	12.13 (85)	MCG	26,219	Saturday, 1 April
Hawthorn	20.7 (127)	Brisbane Bears	11.4 (70)	Waverley Park	14,653	Saturday, 1 April
Geelong	12.15 (87)	Melbourne	11.7 (73)	Kardinia Park	22,707	Saturday, 1 April
Fitzroy	6.2 (38)	Essendon	16.16 (112)	Whitten Oval	17,869	Saturday, 1 April
West Coast	18.13 (121)	St Kilda	11.9 (75)	WACA	28,083	Sunday, 2 April
Carlton	14.11 (95)	Collingwood	9.12 (66)	MCG	87,119	Sunday, 2 April
Footscray	15.12 (102)	Sydney	12.13 (85)	Whitten Oval	19,189	Sunday, 2 April

=== Round 2 ===
Home team	Score	Away team	Score	Venue	Attendance	Date
Fremantle	11.16 (82)	Essendon	12.19 (91)	WACA	23,688	Friday, 7 April
Melbourne	12.15 (87)	North Melbourne	16.10 (106)	MCG	25,010	Saturday, 8 April
Hawthorn	10.11 (71)	Footscray	14.11 (95)	Waverley Park	18,136	Saturday, 8 April
Carlton	18.17 (125)	Fitzroy	8.8 (56)	Princes Park	16,586	Saturday, 8 April
Brisbane Bears	18.18 (126)	Adelaide	14.15 (99)	Gabba	9,334	Sunday, 9 April
Collingwood	11.10 (76)	West Coast	11.14 (80)	MCG	33,129	Sunday, 9 April
St Kilda	9.15 (69)	Richmond	14.11 (95)	Waverley Park	26,037	Sunday, 9 April
Sydney	10.15 (75)	Geelong	11.14 (80)	SCG	12,973	Sunday, 9 April

=== Round 3 ===
Home team	Score	Away team	Score	Venue	Attendance	Date
Fitzroy	11.12 (78)	Fremantle	18.13 (121)	Whitten Oval	7,561	Saturday, 15 April
Geelong	18.14 (122)	Collingwood	14.11 (95)	Kardinia Park	27,057	Saturday, 15 April
Footscray	8.12 (60)	Carlton	23.20 (158)	MCG	41,576	Saturday, 15 April
West Coast	12.19 (91)	North Melbourne	5.13 (43)	WACA	16,586	Saturday, 15 April
Hawthorn	5.4 (34)	Richmond	4.16 (40)	Waverley Park	24,820	Sunday, 16 April
Brisbane Bears	15.14 (104)	Sydney	14.15 (99)	Gabba	8,460	Sunday, 16 April
Adelaide	13.14 (92)	St Kilda	3.8 (26)	Football Park	38,046	Sunday, 16 April
Essendon	14.14 (98)	Melbourne	12.10 (82)	MCG	60,057	Monday, 17 April

=== Round 4 ===
Home team	Score	Away team	Score	Venue	Attendance	Date
Fremantle	12.22 (94)	Geelong	10.15 (75)	WACA	26,455	Friday, 21 April
St Kilda	10.10 (70)	Hawthorn	16.10 (106)	Waverley Park	24,972	Saturday, 22 April
Sydney	17.14 (116)	Fitzroy	12.12 (84)	SCG	10,762	Saturday, 22 April
Brisbane Bears	12.10 (82)	Carlton	18.11 (119)	Gabba	12,009	Sunday, 23 April
Melbourne	12.8 (80)	Footscray	16.7 (103)	Optus Oval	16,969	Sunday, 23 April
Adelaide	7.14 (56)	West Coast	6.10 (46)	Football Park	42,723	Sunday, 23 April
Richmond	21.8 (134)	North Melbourne	13.7 (85)	MCG	62,606	Monday, 24 April
Collingwood	17.9 (111)	Essendon	16.15 (111)	MCG	94,825	Tuesday, 25 April

- This round featured the first Anzac Day match held between Collingwood and Essendon, which famously ended in a draw.
- The crowd of 94,825 for the Anzac Day match was the second-largest crowd for a home and away game in AFL history. It is currently the third-largest crowd, having been surpassed by the crowd of 95,179 at the Round 6, 2023 Anzac Day match.

=== Round 5 ===
Home team	Score	Away team	Score	Venue	Attendance	Date
Richmond	17.14 (116)	Brisbane Bears	14.12 (96)	MCG	24,379	Saturday, 29 April
Geelong	28.13 (181)	Fitzroy	13.14 (92)	Kardinia Park	19,644	Saturday, 29 April
Footscray	14.14 (98)	Fremantle	14.12 (96)	Whitten Oval	16,800	Saturday, 29 April
West Coast	13.12 (90)	Melbourne	11.8 (74)	WACA	30,294	Saturday, 29 April
North Melbourne	7.8 (50)	Carlton	12.12 (84)	MCG	42,729	Sunday, 30 April
Hawthorn	14.12 (96)	Collingwood	4.13 (37)	Waverley Park	40,715	Sunday, 30 April
Essendon	24.10 (154)	St Kilda	5.8 (38)	Optus Oval	17,930	Sunday, 30 April
Sydney	20.24 (144)	Adelaide	12.15 (87)	SCG	15,491	Sunday, 30 April

=== Round 6 ===
Home team	Score	Away team	Score	Venue	Attendance	Date
Adelaide	11.11 (77)	Melbourne	10.9 (69)	Football Park	40,406	Friday, 5 May
St Kilda	10.13 (73)	Fitzroy	12.12 (84)	Waverley Park	15,440	Saturday, 6 May
Carlton	13.12 (90)	West Coast	10.7 (67)	Optus Oval	24,527	Saturday, 6 May
Footscray	8.14 (62)	Geelong	22.18 (150)	Whitten Oval	20,749	Saturday, 6 May
Collingwood	12.10 (82)	Richmond	13.16 (94)	MCG	59,954	Saturday, 6 May
Fremantle	25.13 (163)	Sydney	16.9 (105)	WACA	22,804	Sunday, 7 May
North Melbourne	22.12 (144)	Hawthorn	14.13 (97)	MCG	32,207	Sunday, 7 May
Essendon	19.14 (128)	Brisbane Bears	14.16 (100)	Optus Oval	17,646	Sunday, 7 May

=== Round 7 ===
Home team	Score	Away team	Score	Venue	Attendance	Date
Richmond	10.12 (72)	Adelaide	9.4 (58)	MCG	38,791	Friday, 12 May
Carlton	10.15 (75)	Essendon	9.13 (67)	MCG	73,753	Saturday, 13 May
St Kilda	15.15 (105)	Footscray	12.15 (87)	Waverley Park	13,280	Saturday, 13 May
Geelong	9.19 (73)	Hawthorn	11.12 (78)	Kardinia Park	24,842	Saturday, 13 May
Fitzroy	13.10 (88)	North Melbourne	17.16 (118)	Whitten Oval	11,082	Saturday, 13 May
Collingwood	13.19 (97)	Sydney	11.10 (76)	Victoria Park	22,835	Saturday, 13 May
West Coast	23.13 (151)	Fremantle	9.12 (66)	Subiaco Oval	40,356	Sunday, 14 May
Melbourne	12.10 (82)	Brisbane Bears	10.15 (75)	MCG	12,783	Sunday, 14 May

=== Round 8 ===
Home team	Score	Away team	Score	Venue	Attendance	Date
Sydney	21.6 (132)	Carlton	8.12 (60)	SCG	23,744	Friday, 19 May
Richmond	14.7 (91)	Geelong	24.19 (163)	MCG	65,335	Saturday, 20 May
Hawthorn	7.8 (50)	Melbourne	17.10 (112)	Waverley Park	24,372	Saturday, 20 May
Footscray	13.6 (84)	North Melbourne	15.15 (105)	Whitten Oval	17,741	Saturday, 20 May
Collingwood	20.11 (131)	Fremantle	14.9 (93)	Victoria Park	22,466	Saturday, 20 May
Adelaide	9.12 (66)	Fitzroy	15.9 (99)	Football Park	39,888	Saturday, 20 May
Brisbane Bears	17.13 (115)	St Kilda	14.10 (94)	Gabba	7,648	Sunday, 21 May
West Coast	13.12 (90)	Essendon	16.12 (108)	Subiaco Oval	34,731	Sunday, 21 May

=== Round 9 ===
Home team	Score	Away team	Score	Venue	Attendance	Date
North Melbourne	12.7 (79)	Geelong	20.20 (140)	MCG	44,780	Friday 26 May
Essendon	15.11 (101)	Footscray	9.13 (67)	MCG	38,719	Saturday, 27 May
St Kilda	11.14 (80)	Carlton	3.6 (24)	Waverley Park	17,902	Saturday, 27 May
Fitzroy	8.6 (54)	West Coast	12.10 (82)	Bruce Stadium	11,282	Saturday, 27 May
Adelaide	9.6 (60)	Hawthorn	7.16 (58)	Football Park	38,740	Saturday, 27 May
Sydney	14.6 (90)	Richmond	17.14 (116)	SCG	23,475	Sunday, 28 May
Melbourne	12.13 (85)	Collingwood	7.16 (58)	MCG	51,774	Sunday, 28 May
Fremantle	17.18 (120)	Brisbane Bears	8.6 (54)	Subiaco Oval	17,574	Sunday, 28 May

=== Round 10 ===
Home team	Score	Away team	Score	Venue	Attendance	Date
North Melbourne	19.12 (126)	Essendon	15.9 (99)	MCG	59,354	Friday, 2 June
Melbourne	15.12 (102)	Sydney	11.11 (77)	MCG	26,630	Saturday, 3 June
St Kilda	9.6 (60)	Fremantle	20.11 (131)	Waverley Park	14,890	Saturday, 3 June
Geelong	16.20 (116)	Adelaide	14.7 (91)	Kardinia Park	26,314	Saturday, 3 June
Collingwood	13.15 (93)	Fitzroy	10.19 (79)	Victoria Park	23,356	Saturday, 3 June
West Coast	17.10 (112)	Brisbane Bears	10.7 (67)	Subiaco Oval	26,261	Sunday, 4 June
Footscray	9.10 (64)	Richmond	13.18 (96)	MCG	33,042	Sunday, 4 June
Carlton	26.16 (172)	Hawthorn	10.10 (70)	Optus Oval	29,520	Sunday, 4 June

=== Round 11 ===
Home team	Score	Away team	Score	Venue	Attendance	Date
Collingwood	25.11 (161)	St Kilda	13.9 (87)	MCG	36,528	Friday, 9 June
Essendon	17.10 (112)	Geelong	19.9 (123)	MCG	77,643	Saturday, 10 June
Richmond	18.15 (123)	West Coast	9.9 (63)	Optus Oval	17,041	Saturday, 10 June
Adelaide	12.18 (90)	Footscray	6.10 (46)	Football Park	36,955	Saturday, 10 June
Brisbane Bears	17.30 (132)	Fitzroy	10.14 (74)	Gabba	8,209	Sunday, 11 June
Fremantle	11.6 (72)	North Melbourne	22.11 (143)	Subiaco Oval	28,013	Sunday, 11 June
Melbourne	12.8 (80)	Carlton	16.16 (112)	MCG	53,290	Monday, 12 June
Hawthorn	17.11 (113)	Sydney	9.17 (71)	Waverley Park	19,737	Monday, 12 June

=== Round 12 ===
Home team	Score	Away team	Score	Venue	Attendance	Date
Essendon	10.18 (78)	Hawthorn	8.12 (60)	MCG	47,237	Friday, 23 June
Richmond	15.19 (109)	Fitzroy	15.13 (103)	MCG	26,403	Saturday, 24 June
Footscray	10.11 (71)	Collingwood	10.11 (71)	Waverley Park	27,421	Saturday, 24 June
Carlton	16.16 (112)	Geelong	15.19 (109)	Optus Oval	30,843	Saturday, 24 June
Adelaide	16.9 (105)	Fremantle	12.12 (84)	Football Park	40,981	Saturday, 24 June
Brisbane Bears	13.11 (89)	North Melbourne	20.13 (133)	Gabba	11,996	Sunday, 25 June
St Kilda	11.7 (73)	Melbourne	13.12 (90)	Waverley Park	18,390	Sunday, 25 June
West Coast	11.7 (73)	Sydney	10.12 (72)	Subiaco Oval	24,574	Sunday, 25 June

=== Round 13 ===
Home team	Score	Away team	Score	Venue	Attendance	Date
Collingwood	24.8 (152)	Adelaide	7.14 (56)	MCG	33,407	Friday, 30 June
Melbourne	14.11 (95)	Richmond	12.12 (84)	MCG	42,548	Saturday, 1 July
St Kilda	12.12 (84)	North Melbourne	18.13 (121)	Waverley Park	14,301	Saturday, 1 July
Geelong	17.14 (116)	West Coast	9.10 (64)	Kardinia Park	23,743	Saturday, 1 July
Footscray	9.15 (69)	Brisbane Bears	8.5 (53)	Whitten Oval	11,556	Saturday, 1 July
Sydney	21.12 (138)	Essendon	17.17 (119)	SCG	21,853	Sunday, 2 July
Fitzroy	7.10 (52)	Hawthorn	21.25 (151)	Optus Oval	12,503	Sunday, 2 July
Fremantle	7.7 (49)	Carlton	15.16 (106)	Subiaco Oval	25,465	Sunday, 2 July

=== Round 14 ===
Home team	Score	Away team	Score	Venue	Attendance	Date
North Melbourne	18.17 (125)	Collingwood	10.13 (73)	MCG	66,719	Friday, 7 July
Essendon	27.20 (182)	Adelaide	8.12 (60)	MCG	40,269	Saturday, 8 July
Hawthorn	8.8 (56)	West Coast	14.13 (97)	Waverley Park	19,373	Saturday, 8 July
Geelong	15.21 (111)	Brisbane Bears	15.8 (98)	Kardinia Park	22,459	Saturday, 8 July
Sydney	14.10 (94)	St Kilda	17.17 (119)	SCG	14,979	Sunday, 9 July
Carlton	17.13 (115)	Richmond	12.13 (85)	MCG	84,745	Sunday, 9 July
Fitzroy	12.7 (79)	Footscray	23.8 (146)	Whitten Oval	16,745	Sunday, 9 July
Fremantle	7.8 (50)	Melbourne	15.12 (102)	Subiaco Oval	16,161	Sunday, 9 July

=== Round 15 ===
Home team	Score	Away team	Score	Venue	Attendance	Date
Richmond	15.11 (101)	Essendon	15.11 (101)	MCG	76,628	Friday, 14 July
North Melbourne	12.12 (84)	Sydney	16.17 (113)	MCG	22,524	Saturday, 15 July
Hawthorn	18.10 (118)	Fremantle	11.8 (74)	Waverley Park	14,167	Saturday, 15 July
Carlton	20.13 (133)	Adelaide	15.10 (100)	Optus Oval	22,543	Saturday, 15 July
Fitzroy	7.8 (50)	Melbourne	20.11 (131)	Whitten Oval	8,862	Saturday, 15 July
Brisbane Bears	11.14 (80)	Collingwood	19.15 (129)	Gabba	11,467	Sunday, 16 July
Geelong	13.7 (85)	St Kilda	13.15 (93)	MCG	37,382	Sunday, 16 July
West Coast	8.13 (61)	Footscray	12.15 (87)	Subiaco Oval	30,169	Sunday, 16 July

=== Round 16 ===
Home team	Score	Away team	Score	Venue	Attendance	Date
Adelaide	9.11 (65)	North Melbourne	7.12 (54)	Football Park	34,301	Friday, 21 July
Essendon	22.18 (150)	Fitzroy	12.7 (79)	MCG	25,295	Saturday, 22 July
St Kilda	9.10 (64)	West Coast	19.8 (122)	Waverley Park	13,490	Saturday, 22 July
Melbourne	12.10 (82)	Geelong	15.21 (111)	Optus Oval	18,416	Saturday, 22 July
Sydney	12.7 (79)	Footscray	21.8 (134)	SCG	15,708	Saturday, 22 July
Brisbane Bears	14.20 (104)	Hawthorn	14.13 (97)	Gabba	8,209	Sunday, 23 July
Collingwood	10.8 (68)	Carlton	12.18 (90)	MCG	78,934	Sunday, 23 July
Fremantle	9.13 (67)	Richmond	10.14 (74)	Subiaco Oval	18,723	Sunday, 23 July

*Brisbane Bears came from 45 points down at 3 quarter time to beat Hawthorn by 7 points.

=== Round 17 ===
Home team	Score	Away team	Score	Venue	Attendance	Date
North Melbourne	12.8 (80)	Melbourne	15.12 (102)	MCG	28,838	Friday, 28 July
Essendon	21.9 (135)	Fremantle	13.9 (87)	MCG	29,102	Saturday, 29 July
Richmond	9.8 (62)	St Kilda	15.17 (107)	Optus Oval	15,715	Saturday, 29 July
Geelong	23.13 (151)	Sydney	11.8 (74)	Kardinia Park	28,600	Saturday, 29 July
Footscray	8.9 (57)	Hawthorn	7.10 (52)	Whitten Oval	16,673	Saturday, 29 July
West Coast	18.21 (129)	Collingwood	11.13 (79)	Subiaco Oval	35,332	Sunday, 30 July
Fitzroy	9.10 (64)	Carlton	24.17 (161)	Waverley Park	15,567	Sunday, 30 July
Adelaide	6.10 (46)	Brisbane Bears	11.10 (76)	Football Park	33,829	Sunday, 30 July

=== Round 18 ===
Home team	Score	Away team	Score	Venue	Attendance	Date
Richmond	13.21 (99)	Hawthorn	8.7 (55)	MCG	37,543	Friday, 4 August
Melbourne	11.7 (73)	Essendon	15.16 (106)	MCG	52,523	Saturday, 5 August
St Kilda	10.8 (68)	Adelaide	14.14 (98)	Waverley Park	13,141	Saturday, 5 August
North Melbourne	15.16 (106)	West Coast	7.2 (44)	Optus Oval	11,822	Saturday, 5 August
Sydney	17.9 (111)	Brisbane Bears	19.12 (126)	SCG	8,150	Sunday, 6 August
Collingwood	15.9 (99)	Geelong	14.11 (95)	MCG	62,212	Sunday, 6 August
Carlton	15.16 (106)	Footscray	11.15 (81)	Optus Oval	24,084	Sunday, 6 August
Fremantle	17.14 (116)	Fitzroy	9.10 (64)	Subiaco Oval	20,073	Sunday, 6 August

=== Round 19 ===
Home team	Score	Away team	Score	Venue	Attendance	Date
North Melbourne	16.14 (110)	Richmond	15.10 (100)	MCG	51,247	Friday, 11 August
Essendon	16.14 (110)	Collingwood	15.12 (102)	MCG	77,448	Saturday, 12 August
Hawthorn	14.13 (97)	St Kilda	16.9 (105)	Waverley Park	19,852	Saturday, 12 August
Geelong	16.10 (106)	Fremantle	12.11 (83)	Kardinia Park	20,679	Saturday, 12 August
Footscray	11.12 (78)	Melbourne	7.16 (58)	Whitten Oval	17,697	Saturday, 12 August
West Coast	26.21 (177)	Adelaide	5.12 (42)	Subiaco Oval	30,507	Sunday, 13 August
Carlton	11.19 (85)	Brisbane Bears	10.11 (71)	Optus Oval	16,350	Sunday, 13 August
Fitzroy	6.8 (44)	Sydney	27.8 (170)	Whitten Oval	7,426	Sunday, 13 August

=== Round 20 ===
Home team	Score	Away team	Score	Venue	Attendance	Date
Collingwood	15.14 (104)	Hawthorn	15.11 (101)	MCG	51,746	Friday, 18 August
Melbourne	10.15 (75)	West Coast	16.8 (104)	MCG	24,874	Saturday, 19 August
St Kilda	10.15 (75)	Essendon	23.13 (151)	Waverley Park	34,121	Saturday, 19 August
Carlton	18.14 (122)	North Melbourne	15.13 (103)	Optus Oval	32,065	Saturday, 19 August
Fitzroy	8.17 (65)	Geelong	15.16 (106)	Whitten Oval	9,196	Saturday, 19 August
Adelaide	13.15 (93)	Sydney	22.7 (139)	Football Park	38,529	Saturday, 19 August
Brisbane Bears	24.16 (160)	Richmond	13.5 (83)	Gabba	11,524	Sunday, 20 August
Fremantle	17.14 (116)	Footscray	12.13 (85)	Subiaco Oval	18,175	Sunday, 20 August

=== Round 21 ===
Home team	Score	Away team	Score	Venue	Attendance	Date
Melbourne	18.7 (115)	Adelaide	23.8 (146)	MCG	22,800	Friday, 25 August
Richmond	14.25 (109)	Collingwood	7.13 (55)	MCG	70,809	Saturday, 26 August
Hawthorn	9.14 (68)	North Melbourne	17.11 (113)	Waverley Park	21,513	Saturday, 26 August
Geelong	15.20 (110)	Footscray	19.11 (125)	Kardinia Park	25,057	Saturday, 26 August
Fitzroy	13.12 (90)	St Kilda	16.21 (117)	Optus Oval	9,363	Saturday, 26 August
Brisbane Bears	17.14 (116)	Essendon	12.12 (84)	Gabba	12,657	Saturday, 26 August
Sydney	19.13 (127)	Fremantle	20.24 (144)	SCG	10,410	Sunday, 27 August
West Coast	16.8 (104)	Carlton	15.15 (105)	Subiaco Oval	41,492	Sunday, 27 August

Tony Lockett kicked both his 100th goal for the season and his 1000th career goal during the Sydney Swans v Fremantle game at the Sydney Cricket Ground.
The Brisbane Bears vs Essendon Bombers game at the Gabba is the first ever night game in Brisbane.

=== Round 22 ===
Home team	Score	Away team	Score	Venue	Attendance	Date
Brisbane Bears	16.14 (110)	Melbourne	13.11 (89)	Gabba	11,842	Friday, 1 September
Essendon	9.13 (67)	Carlton	16.12 (108)	MCG	87,984	Saturday, 2 September
Hawthorn	15.12 (102)	Geelong	23.10 (148)	Waverley Park	32,747	Saturday, 2 September
North Melbourne	30.24 (204)	Fitzroy	15.11 (101)	Optus Oval	14,907	Saturday, 2 September
Footscray	11.12 (78)	St Kilda	20.12 (132)	Whitten Oval	19,442	Saturday, 2 September
Adelaide	12.14 (86)	Richmond	19.9 (123)	Football Park	40,168	Saturday, 2 September
Sydney	19.13 (127)	Collingwood	15.14 (104)	SCG	18,191	Sunday, 3 September
Fremantle	8.10 (58)	West Coast	16.15 (111)	Subiaco Oval	39,844	Sunday, 3 September

== Ladder ==
(P)	Premiers
	Qualified for finals

#	Team	P	W	L	D	PF	PA	%	Pts
1	Carlton (P)	22	20	2	0	2357	1711	137.8	80
2	Geelong	22	16	6	0	2558	1939	131.9	64
3	Richmond	22	15	6	1	2096	1943	107.9	62
4	Essendon	22	14	6	2	2464	1931	127.6	60
5	West Coast	22	14	8	0	2079	1692	122.9	56
6	North Melbourne	22	14	8	0	2311	2013	114.8	56
7	Footscray	22	11	10	1	1879	2054	91.5	46
8	Brisbane Bears	22	10	12	0	2104	2207	95.3	40
9	Melbourne	22	9	13	0	1938	1925	100.7	36
10	Collingwood	22	8	12	2	2043	2111	96.8	36
11	Adelaide	22	9	13	0	1749	2184	80.1	36
12	Sydney	22	8	14	0	2314	2299	100.7	32
13	Fremantle	22	8	14	0	2051	2209	92.8	32
14	St Kilda	22	8	14	0	1814	2258	80.3	32
15	Hawthorn	22	7	15	0	1857	1975	94.0	28
16	Fitzroy	22	2	20	0	1617	2780	58.2	8

Rules for classification: 1. premiership points; 2. percentage; 3. points for
Average score: 94.4
Source: AFL Tables

== Progression by round ==
Numbers highlighted in green indicate that the team finished the round inside the top 8.
Numbers highlighted in blue indicates the team finished first on the ladder in that round.
Numbers highlighted in red indicates the team finished in last place on the ladder in that round.

Team ╲ Round	1	2	3	4	5	6	7	8	9	10	11	12	13	14	15	16	17	18	19	20	21	22
Carlton (P)	4	8	12	16	20	24	28	28	28	32	36	40	44	48	52	56	60	64	68	72	76	80
Geelong	4	8	12	12	16	20	20	24	28	32	36	36	40	44	44	48	52	52	56	60	60	64
Richmond	4	8	12	16	20	24	28	28	32	36	40	44	44	44	46	50	50	54	54	54	58	62
Essendon	4	8	12	14	18	22	22	26	30	30	30	34	34	38	40	44	48	52	56	60	60	60
West Coast Eagles	4	8	12	12	16	16	20	20	24	28	28	32	32	36	36	40	44	44	48	52	52	56
North Melbourne	4	8	8	8	8	12	16	20	20	24	28	32	36	40	40	40	40	44	48	48	52	56
Footscray	4	8	8	12	16	16	16	16	16	16	16	18	22	26	30	34	38	38	42	42	46	46
Brisbane Bears	0	4	8	8	8	8	8	12	12	12	16	16	16	16	16	20	24	28	28	32	36	40
Melbourne	0	0	0	0	0	0	4	8	12	16	16	20	24	28	32	32	36	36	36	36	36	36
Collingwood	0	0	0	2	2	2	6	10	10	14	18	20	24	24	28	28	28	32	32	36	36	36
Adelaide	0	0	4	8	8	12	12	12	16	16	20	24	24	24	24	28	28	32	32	32	36	36
Sydney	0	0	0	4	8	8	8	12	12	12	12	12	16	16	20	20	20	20	24	28	28	32
Fremantle	0	0	4	8	8	12	12	12	16	20	20	20	20	20	20	20	20	24	24	28	32	32
St Kilda	0	0	0	0	0	0	4	4	8	8	8	8	8	12	16	16	20	20	24	24	28	32
Hawthorn	4	4	4	8	12	12	16	16	16	16	20	20	24	24	28	28	28	28	28	28	28	28
Fitzroy	0	0	0	0	0	4	4	8	8	8	8	8	8	8	8	8	8	8	8	8	8	8

== Finals ==
=== Qualifying Finals ===
Home team	Score	Away team	Score	Venue	Attendance	Date
Richmond	12.12 (84)	North Melbourne	17.12 (114)	MCG	68,226	Friday, 8 September
Essendon	11.8 (74)	West Coast	8.7 (55)	Waverley Park	36,102	Saturday, 9 September
Geelong	24.11 (155)	Footscray	10.13 (73)	MCG	59,889	Saturday, 9 September
Carlton	13.12 (90)	Brisbane Bears	12.5 (77)	MCG	52,092	Sunday, 10 September

=== Semi finals ===
Home team	Score	Away team	Score	Venue	Attendance	Date
Essendon	11.7 (73)	Richmond	12.14 (86)	MCG	88,308	Saturday, 16 September
North Melbourne	18.21 (129)	West Coast	10.11 (71)	MCG	53,759	Sunday, 17 September

=== Preliminary Finals ===
Home team	Score	Away team	Score	Venue	Attendance	Date
Geelong	20.9 (129)	Richmond	6.4 (40)	Waverley Park	70,321	Saturday, 23 September
Carlton	18.10 (118)	North Melbourne	8.8 (56)	MCG	72,552	Saturday, 23 September

=== Grand final ===
Home team	Score	Away team	Score	Venue	Attendance	Date
Geelong	11.14 (80)	Carlton	21.15 (141)	MCG	93,102	Saturday, 30 September

== Awards ==
- The Brownlow Medal was awarded to Paul Kelly of Sydney.
- The Leigh Matthews Trophy was awarded to Wayne Carey of North Melbourne.
- The Coleman Medal was awarded to Gary Ablett of Geelong.
- The Norm Smith Medal was awarded to Greg Williams of Carlton.
- The AFL Rising Star award was awarded to Nick Holland of Hawthorn.
- The Wooden Spoon was "awarded" to Fitzroy.

== Notable events ==
- The Fremantle Dockers made their debut in the competition.
  - They played their first game against Richmond at the MCG and won their first game against Fitzroy at Whitten Oval.
- The first ANZAC Day clash between Collingwood and Essendon was held in round 4 which ended in a draw.
- Carlton won a record 16th premiership, winning twenty games for the home-and-away season, also a new record (subsequently surpassed by Essendon in 2000 and Geelong in 2008). They won their 16th consecutive match in the grand final, comfortably beating Geelong 21.15 (141) to 11.14 (80).
  - Amidst these records, they also suffered the rare ignominy of losing to the bottom team (St Kilda) while atop the ladder in their Round 9 game. In this game, they failed to score a goal in the first half and became the fifth (and to date last) premier team to have kicked a season's lowest score (also in 1923, 1968, 1970 and 1992).
- Richmond reached the finals for the first time since 1982, finishing 3rd and making the preliminary finals.
  - They won their first 7 games, winning their first five games for the first time since 1982.
  - They were on top of the ladder for the first time since 1982 (from rounds 9 to 12).
- Brisbane Bears made an exceptional late season charge to reach the finals for the first time in team history.
  - The Bears sat 14th after 15 rounds with a win–loss record of 4–11 and a percentage of 83.2%.
  - In Round 16 at the Gabba against Hawthorn, the Bears trailed Hawthorn by 45 points at three-quarter time, but scored nine goals to one in the final quarter to pull off a seven-point victory. It set a new record as the largest three-quarter time deficit ever overcome in VFL/AFL history, a record which stood until 2025. The Bears were still in 14th place at the end of the game.
  - Brisbane won its next two games against bottom eight opposition to reach 12th place, but were to face Carlton, Richmond and Essendon (who then held the top three places respectively) in the following three weeks. Against all odds, Brisbane lost to Carlton by only 14 points, then thrashed the Tigers by 77 points and beat Essendon by 32 points.
  - At the start of the final round, Melbourne, Collingwood and Brisbane sat 8th, 9th and 10th respectively, all on nine wins. Brisbane needed to beat Melbourne, and rely on Sydney (13th place) beating Collingwood to reach the finals. Brisbane beat Melbourne by 21 points on Friday night, then watched on Sunday as Sydney scored eight final quarter goals to overhaul Collingwood by 23 points.
  - The Bears finals appearance was short-lived, as the eventual premiers Carlton beat them by 13 points in the first week of the finals in a very high standard game.
  - However, the 10 wins and 12 losses of Brisbane in 1995, remains the worst record of a team in VFL/AFL history which qualified a team for the finals (excluding those seasons where more than half of teams qualified for the finals).
- Tony Lockett transferred from St Kilda to Sydney.
- Footscray, VFL and State of Origin legend Ted Whitten died.
  - He had been given a "lap of honour" during the 1995 State of Origin match between Victoria and South Australia. The State of Origin saw Victoria win against South Australia in Melbourne and Allies win against Western Australia in Perth.
  - The Western Oval would be renamed the Whitten Oval in his memory.
- Hawthorn missed out on the finals for the first time since 1981.
  - The team finished second last, failing to register a win for its last seven matches.
- Fitzroy continued to decline, failing to register a win from round 9 and finished on the bottom of the ladder with just 2 wins.
- There were many significant changes to incumbent AFL team coaches:
- After round 19, the Fitzroy coach Bernie Quinlan was sacked and replaced by caretaker coach Alan McConnell for the remaining three games of their season (Michael Nunan later was signed as coach for 1996).
- Peter Knights was sacked as coach of Hawthorn.
- John Northey resigned from Richmond (he became coach of Brisbane Bears in 1996).
- Robert Walls resigned as coach of Brisbane Bears and joined Richmond as coach in 1996.
- Ron Barassi coached his last VFL/AFL match, resigning as coach of Sydney at the end of 1995.
- The first ever (and to date only) AFL game was played at Bruce Stadium in Canberra, between Fitzroy and West Coast Eagles in round 9.

== Sources ==
- 1995 AFL season at AFL Tables
- 1995 AFL season at Australian Football
