= James Hird =

Australian rules footballer (born 1973)

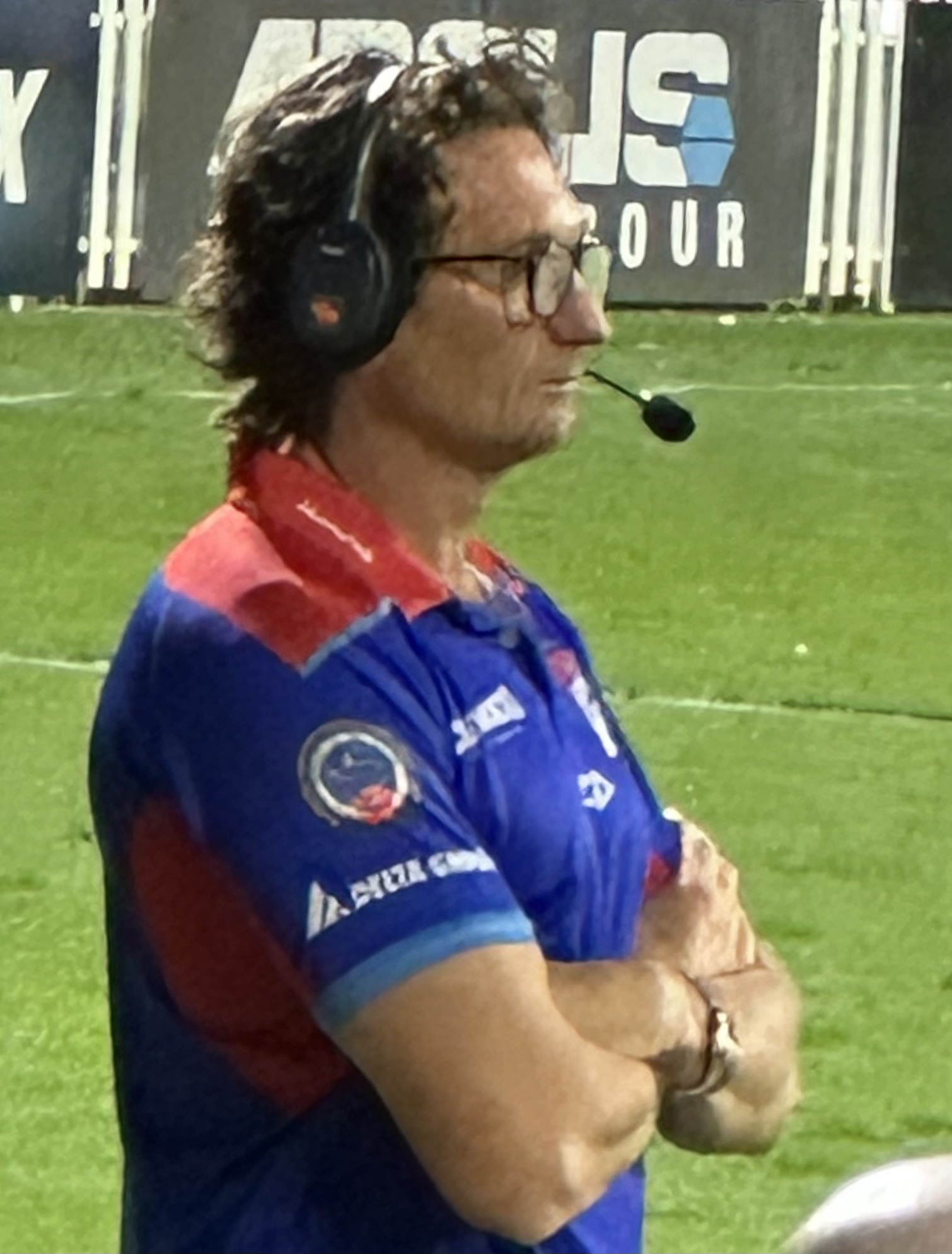
- Hird with Port Melbourne in 2025

Personal information
- Full name: James Albert Hird
- Nickname: Hirdy
- Born: 4 February 1973 (age 53); Canberra, Australia
- Original team: Ainslie (ACTAFL)
- Draft: No. 79, 1990 National Draft
- Height: 188 cm (6 ft 2 in)
- Weight: 89 kg (196 lb)
- Position: Midfielder / half-forward

Playing career
Years	Club	Games (Goals)
1992–2007	Essendon	253 (343)

Representative team honours
Years	Team	Games (Goals)
1993	NSW/ACT	1 (3)

International team honours
2000–2004	Australia	4 (3)

Coaching career
Years	Club	Games (W–L–D)
2011–2013, 2015	Essendon	85 (41–43–1)
2022	Greater Western Sydney (Assistant Coach)	
2025–	Port Melbourne (Director of Football)	

Career highlights
- 2× AFL premiership player: 1993, 2000 (c); Norm Smith Medal: 2000; Brownlow Medal: 1996; 5× All-Australian team: 1995, 1996, 2000, 2001, 2003; 5× Essendon best and fairest: 1994, 1995, 1996, 2003, 2007; 2× Essendon leading goalkicker: 1995–96; Essendon captain: 1998–2005; Australian Football Hall of Fame; Essendon Team of the Century; Champions of Essendon: No. 3; 3× AFL pre-season premierships: 1993, 1994, 2000; 3× AFL Anzac Medal: 2000, 2003, 2004; Jim Stynes Medal: 2000; Football Achievement Award: 2007; Personal Development Award: 2007; 1993 AFL Rising Star nominee

James Albert Hird (born 4 February 1973) is a former professional Australian rules football player and past senior coach of the Essendon Football Club in the Australian Football League (AFL).

Hird played as a midfielder and half-forward, but he was often given free rein by then-Essendon coach Kevin Sheedy to play wherever he thought necessary. Hird was a highly decorated footballer, with accolades including the 1996 Brownlow Medal and membership of the Australian Football Hall of Fame. In 2008, he was listed by journalist Mike Sheahan as the 20th greatest player of all time in the AFL-commissioned book The Australian Game of Football.

Hird was appointed as the coach of the Essendon Football Club in September 2010. In August 2013, he was suspended from coaching for 12 months when he was charged by the AFL with conduct prejudicing the game in relation to his role in the Essendon Football Club supplements controversy. He returned to the club following the 2014 season but resigned in August 2015.

== Early life ==
Hird is the son of Allan and Margaret Hird. He was born in Canberra, where his father worked in the public service and his mother was a teacher, although they had met in Melbourne. Hird has two younger sisters. After first living in the Canberra suburb of Ainslie, his family moved to Latham. When Hird was in high school, the family moved to the suburb of Reid.

Hird participated in rugby league, ballet, and soccer in his youth. He played for the Ainslie Football Club in the ACTAFL, and in June 1990, at the age of 17, he was a member of the league's senior representative team in a match against the Victorian Football Association.

== Playing career ==
=== Essendon ===
==== Early career ====
He was recruited to the AFL by Essendon from the 1990 AFL draft; however, due to a serious hip injury along with other injuries in his junior football career, he was not selected until pick number 79, Essendon's seventh pick and one of the last in the draft. Due to injury, Hird missed out on playing for most of 1991, his first season with the club. At the end of the season, a vote was held on whether to delist him. The majority (4–2) voted in favour of Hird being delisted, but coach Kevin Sheedy, sensing a promising future for the young Hird, voted to keep him. Ultimately, Hird remained with the club. He made his senior debut against St Kilda in 1992 at Waverley Park as a late replacement for former captain Terry Daniher. Hird spent most of the season in the Essendon Reserves, which, under Denis Pagan, won the premiership that season. He achieved regular selection in the Essendon senior team during the 1993 season. In that season, he was a member of what was referred to as the "Baby Bombers", a group of young players (most notably including Hird, Mark Mercuri, Gavin Wanganeen, Dustin Fletcher, Ricky Olarenshaw, David Calthorpe, Paul Hills and Joe Misiti) that played a key role in the side winning the premiership that year. In 1994, Hird won the first of three consecutive best-and-fairest awards, culminating in his 1996 season that earned him a Brownlow Medal.

A series of injuries restricted Hird's appearances during the remainder of the 1990s. He played only seven games in 1997, and, although he was named captain in 1998 (a position he held until the end of 2005), he was restricted to thirteen games that year due to injury-related issues. An even worse year followed in 1999, with stress fractures in his foot keeping him to only two games.

==== Early 2000s ====
In 2000, both Hird and the Essendon Football Club experienced the most dominant season in AFL football to date. Injury-free, he received numerous honours, including selection in the All-Australian team and the Norm Smith Medal as best on ground in the AFL Grand Final. The Essendon team also won the Ansett Cup pre-season competition as well as the regular season premiership. The team only lost one game — against the Western Bulldogs—in the entire calendar year.

The year 2002 then saw Hird's worst injury, a horrific facial injury sustained in a match against Fremantle when he collided with teammate Mark McVeigh's knee, fracturing several bones; Hird was in hospital for a week and missed several weeks of the season.

In 2003, despite again missing many games through various injuries (eight games in total), Hird tied with Scott Lucas for the best-and-fairest award. He also narrowly missed out on a second Brownlow Medal, finishing three votes shy of joint winners Mark Ricciuto, Nathan Buckley and Adam Goodes. He gained a place in the 2003 All-Australian team, the fifth and final time in his career.

One of Hird's more memorable performances was in his Round 3 game against West Coast in 2004. Up until three-quarter time, Hird had 19 disposals and one goal; in the final quarter, however, he managed 15 disposals and two decisive goals. Despite the incredible effort, and to the consternation of fans, Hird did not receive any Brownlow Medal votes from the umpires for his 34 disposals and clutch goals, which was perceived by some as retribution for his comments earlier in the week against umpire Scott McLaren, for which he was fined $20,000. Hird's winning goal was the focus of a popular instalment of the Toyota Memorable Moments advertising campaign, and the hug is captured in Jamie Cooper's painting the Game That Made Australia, commissioned by the AFL in 2008 to celebrate the 150th anniversary of the sport.

On 27 September 2005, Hird handed the captaincy to Matthew Lloyd following the side's 2005 season in which it missed the finals for the first time since 1997.

After Lloyd sustained a season-ending hamstring injury in Round 3, 2006, Hird served briefly as acting captain until young ruckman David Hille was named acting captain for the remainder of the 2006 season.

Hird continued to be an outstanding performer in his utility role when fit, but age was forcing him to miss games through injury with increasing frequency. He suffered broken ribs and a calf strain during his 200th and 250th games, respectively.

==== Final season and retirement ====
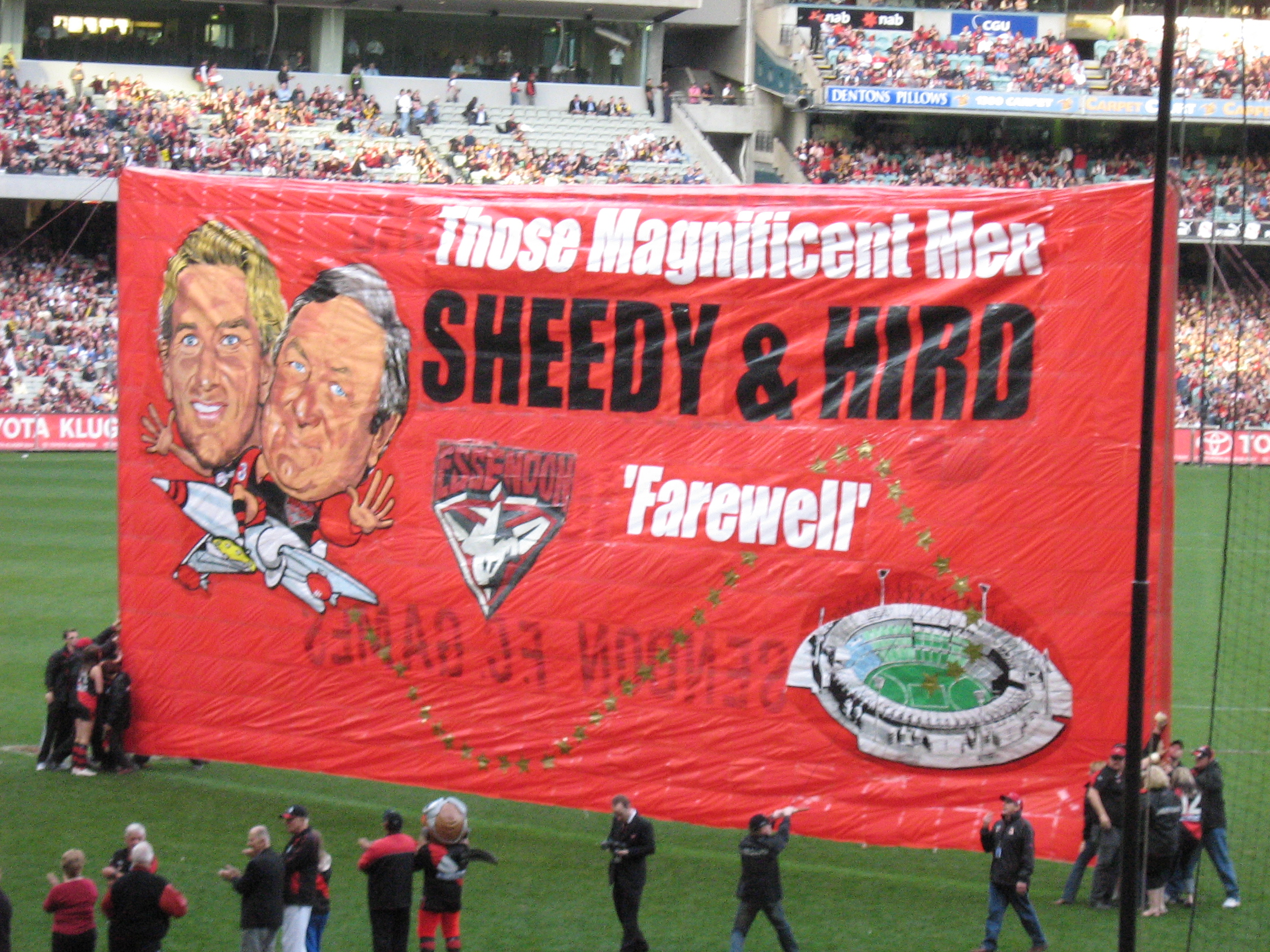
Kevin Sheedy and Hird farewell banner ahead of their final game at the Melbourne Cricket Ground

Despite much speculation that he would retire at the end of the 2006 season, Hird played out the 2007 season, playing 17 of a possible 22 games. Aged 34, Hird continued to feature prominently among Essendon's best players and concluded his career by winning a fifth best-and-fairest award.

Hird played two farewell games: his final game in Victoria at the Melbourne Cricket Ground against Richmond and his final game overall at Subiaco Oval against West Coast. The games were made higher profile as they were also the final games coached by 27-year coach Kevin Sheedy. Hird was one of the best on field in his final game, with 34 disposals, one shy of his career high. As Hird and Sheedy left the field for the last time, the crowd gave them a standing ovation.

Before season 2008, the Archer–Hird Medal was created to honour Hird and former North Melbourne Football Club player and fellow future Australian Football Hall of Fame inductee Glenn Archer. From 2008 until 2013, the medal was awarded to the player showing the most determination, courage and skill in matches between the Kangaroos and the Bombers.

== Coaching career ==
Immediately after Hird retired from playing football, there was much speculation as to whether he would be interested in a coaching role at a club in the AFL, but primarily at Essendon. After initially dodging questions about his future, Hird stated in August 2010 that "There's something in me, deep in my heart, that says at some point I want to coach Essendon". These words came as a surprise to many, including former premiership teammate Matthew Lloyd, who said that Hird had "changed his whole persona in regards to how he's answering his questions... Just in regards to saying, 'I'll coach one day. I want to coach Essendon one day'. Even those type of words, I haven't heard before." These comments by Hird, considered to be Essendon's "favourite son", furthered speculation towards the future of then-Essendon coach Matthew Knights. A rumour emerged following these comments suggesting that Hird was part of an unofficial agreement with the Essendon board to replace Matthew Knights for the 2011 AFL Season. However, two days after Hird's initial comments, he announced that he had changed his mind due to the intense division and speculation over Matthew Knights' future following Hird's initial comments. Hird stated that he was ruling himself out of coaching Essendon for at least three years.

=== Essendon ===
On 28 September 2010, the rumours were confirmed when Essendon's chief executive officer, Ian Robson, and chairman, David Evans, announced at an official press conference that Hird would be the senior coach of the Essendon Football Club on a four-year contract. Hird replaced Matthew Knights as senior coach of Essendon.

Hird's coaching career began with the Bombers winning against triple preliminary finalists the Western Bulldogs in the first round. Wins against St Kilda, the Gold Coast (by a record margin of 139 points), West Coast and Brisbane Lions in the first eight rounds saw the Bombers in the top four by round eight, but a draw against Carlton, losses to Sydney and Collingwood and a five-game losing streak halfway through the season saw Essendon drop to tenth on the ladder after Round 14. Hird's team then won by four points against the previously undefeated Geelong in Round 15, whom assistant coach Mark Thompson was coaching against for the first time since his exit from the club. Prior to that match, Essendon had one of the worst records among current AFL clubs against Geelong in recent times, having only beaten the club once since 2003. Hird coached Essendon to the 2011 finals, where they lost against rivals Carlton in an elimination final at the MCG.

At the start of the 2012 season, Essendon won eight of their first nine games (the only loss being by one point to Collingwood on ANZAC Day), at which point Essendon were in first position on the league ladder. The club then won 11 of their first 14 games but this was followed by seven consecutive losses until the end of the season. The club ended 2012 in 11th place. A spate of soft-tissue injuries accompanied the decline, as did noticeable fatigue in other players, leading to criticism of the club's fitness and conditioning coach Dean Robinson and, indirectly, Hird and his assistant Thompson for having overseen Robinson's program.

The 2013 season was initially a good one for Hird and the football club, during which the team was second on the AFL ladder with a 13–3 win–loss record after 17 rounds. However, internal pressure on the club finally took its toll on the players and coach when the AFL banned Essendon from participating in the 2013 finals series. The club on-field performances fell away and lost five of their last six games. In August 2013, he was suspended from coaching for 12 months when he was charged by the AFL with conduct prejudicing the game in relation to his role in the Essendon Football Club supplements controversy.

Banned from coaching in 2014, Hird spent several months living in France attending an exclusive business school, INSEAD, near Paris. He returned to the club following the 2014 season. Shortly after returning from his suspension, on 2 October 2014, it was reported that Hird was to be sacked by Essendon due to his determination to lodge an appeal against the Federal Court decision handed down the previous month when the club had chosen not to.

On 18 August 2015, following a 112-point loss to Adelaide in Round 20, 2015—and a dismal season overall for the Essendon Football Club, by which time they had a 5–14 win–loss record and were fifteenth on the AFL ladder—Hird resigned as senior coach. Hird was then replaced by assistant coach Matthew Egan as caretaker senior coach of Essendon for the remainder of the 2015 AFL season.

=== Greater Western Sydney ===
On 17 May 2022, it was announced that Hird would be joining the coaching staff at Greater Western Sydney as part-time assistant coach for the rest of the 2022 season under GWS caretaker senior coach and his former teammate Mark McVeigh, who replaced Leon Cameron after he resigned as the club's senior coach midway through the season. On 2 February 2023, Hird departed the club.

=== Port Melbourne director of coaching ===
Since 2025, Hird has served as the director of coaching at the Port Melbourne Football Club in the Victorian Football League (VFL).

=== Bid to return to coaching Essendon ===
Towards the end of the 2026 AFL season, Hird made a bid to return as coach for Essendon in 2027. However, the board eventually decided to select Mark McVeigh, who played alongside with, and was coached by, Hird at Essendon.

== Media career ==
Following Hird's retirement as a player from the Bombers at the end of the 2007 AFL season, he became a commentator and football analyst for Australian rules football on Fox Sports, a position which he held until he began his coaching career at the end of 2010. Hird also became a writer for Melbourne newspaper the Herald Sun. At the start of 2025, Hird joined the Nine Network, becoming a panellist on the Tuesday night edition of Footy Classified, as well as Sunday night program Footy Furnace.

== Honours ==
Hird jointly won the Brownlow Medal with Michael Voss in 1996, the award for the fairest and best player in the Australian Football League. After his retirement, Hird stated that being a member of the "Brownlow Club" was a privilege.

In 1997, the Essendon Football Club named the then-triple best and fairest winner in its Team of the Century on the half-forward flank.

In 2002, the Essendon Football Club conducted a fan-voted promotion to find the "Champions of Essendon". Hird was eventually named as the number three player on the all-time list of Essendon players.

== Supplements controversy ==
In April 2013, Hird, as coach, was accused of being personally injected with supplements in 2011 and 2012 that would be deemed performance enhancing if he were a player. Essendon players from 2011 and 2012 were also accused of ingesting performance enhancing supplements. As head coach, Hird was subsequently implicated.

Following months of rumours and investigations, on 13 August 2013, Hird, along with the Essendon Football Club, senior assistant coach Mark Thompson, football manager Danny Corcoran and club doctor Bruce Reid, was charged by the AFL with bringing the game into disrepute in relation to the poor governance of the supplements program at the club in 2011 and 2012. The club was given 14 days to consider the charges and faced an AFL Commission hearing on 26 August 2013.

On 27 August 2013, following much negotiation, Hird accepted charges that he had brought the game into disrepute and abandoned possible Supreme Court action against the AFL and its chief executive, Andrew Demetriou. He maintained that he did little wrong, but said he should have known more about the club's supplements program. He was banned from working at any AFL club in any capacity for twelve months commencing from 25 August 2013. Hird was allowed to attend Essendon matches as a spectator during this period. However, despite not being allowed to pay him for working as a coach during 2014, the club paid Hird $1 million in advance for 2014 in December 2013.

A media report on 3 October 2013 said that Hird denied pleading guilty for a reduced charge as alleged by Demetriou. Hird's lawyer, Steven Amendola, asserted that the AFL withdrew all charges against Hird under the deeds of settlement that he and the club signed with the AFL. At the time of the media report, Hird was considering legal action against both the AFL and Demetriou.

Essendon chairman Paul Little said that Hird would be wanted as the senior coach once his suspension was served and that he had been offered a two-year extension from 2015, which would have seen him coaching until the end of the 2016 season. However, Hird resigned after round 20 in August 2015, near the end of the season, with the team near the bottom of the ladder.

== Personal life ==
Hird married Tania Poynton on 11 October 1997. Around the time of the marriage, Poynton was working as a lawyer at legal firm Corrs Chambers Westgarth, where she remained until 2002. The couple have since separated. Hird shares four children with Tania: a daughter and three sons. One of his sons, Thomas Hird, was signed as a category B rookie at Essendon in 2019 and was delisted by Essendon in 2022. Tom Hird now plays for the Port Melbourne Football Club in the Victorian Football League.

Hird's paternal grandfather, the late Allan Hird, Sr., was a notable player for and president of the Essendon Football Club, and his father, Allan Hird, Jr., had a brief playing career with Essendon.

Hird completed a bachelor's degree in civil engineering in 1998 and worked in that capacity as a consultant on the CityLink project. He has also spent time working for a stockbroking firm and is an active partner in Gemba, a sports marketing and media consultancy firm based in Melbourne. He is the founder and managing director of Euree Asset Management, where he currently works.

On 5 January 2017, Hird was taken to a private hospital following a drug overdose and suspected suicide attempt and was subsequently transferred to a specialist mental health care facility for further care and treatment.

On 28 November 2018, Hird was hit by a car when cycling in Richmond.

== Statistics ==
=== Playing statistics ===
Legend
G	Goals	K	Kicks	D	Disposals	T	Tackles
B	Behinds	H	Handballs	M	Marks
#	Played in that season's premiership team	±	Won that season's Brownlow Medal

Season	Team	No.	Games	Totals							Averages (per game)							Votes
Season	Team	No.	Games	G	B	K	H	D	M	T	G	B	K	H	D	M	T	Votes
1991	Essendon	49	0	—	—	—	—	—	—	—	—	—	—	—	—	—	—	0
1992	Essendon	49	4	5	5	45	24	69	29	2	1.2	1.2	11.2	6.0	17.2	7.2	0.5	0
1993^{#}	Essendon	5	16	31	20	174	88	262	89	16	1.9	1.2	10.9	5.5	16.4	5.6	1.0	6
1994	Essendon	5	20	27	17	224	155	379	143	31	1.4	0.8	11.2	7.8	19.0	7.2	1.6	6
1995	Essendon	5	24	47	31	254	201	455	177	25	2.0	1.3	10.6	8.4	19.0	7.4	1.0	7
1996	Essendon	5	24	39	39	330	237	567	175	34	1.6	1.6	13.8	9.9	23.6	7.3	1.4	21^{±}
1997	Essendon	5	7	18	9	75	47	122	31	11	2.6	1.3	10.7	6.7	17.4	4.4	1.6	3
1998	Essendon	5	13	19	19	159	89	248	73	24	1.5	1.5	12.2	6.8	19.1	5.6	1.8	4
1999	Essendon	5	2	1	2	19	11	30	5	3	0.5	1.0	9.5	5.5	15.0	2.5	1.5	0
2000^{#}	Essendon	5	20	36	18	294	145	439	115	41	1.8	0.9	14.7	7.2	22.0	5.8	2.0	16
2001	Essendon	5	22	27	17	266	134	400	109	45	1.2	0.8	12.1	6.1	18.2	5.0	2.0	5
2002	Essendon	5	16	11	9	232	104	336	84	29	0.7	0.6	14.5	6.5	21.0	5.2	1.8	7
2003	Essendon	5	18	13	11	279	117	396	77	44	0.7	0.6	15.5	6.5	22.0	4.3	2.4	19
2004	Essendon	5	20	25	14	307	114	421	103	40	1.2	0.7	15.4	5.7	21.0	5.2	2.0	9
2005	Essendon	5	17	17	8	234	80	314	78	36	1.0	0.5	13.8	4.7	18.5	4.6	2.1	8
2006	Essendon	5	13	19	9	172	93	265	86	20	1.5	0.7	13.2	7.2	20.4	6.6	1.5	5
2007	Essendon	5	17	8	6	278	94	372	109	38	0.5	0.4	16.4	5.5	21.9	6.4	2.2	9
Career			253	343	234	3342	1733	5075	1483	439	1.4	0.9	13.2	6.8	20.1	5.9	1.7	125

=== Coaching statistics ===
Legend
W	Wins	L	Losses	D	Draws	%	Win percentage
†	Team qualified for finals

Season	Team	Ladder	Home-and-away season					Finals					Total																			
Season	Team	Ladder	Games	W	L	D	%	Games	W	L	D	%	Games	W	L	D	%															
2011	Essendon	8 / 17^{†}	Games	W	L	D	%	Games	W	L	D	%	Games	W	L	D	%	22	11	10	1	52.3%	1	0	1	0	0.0%	23	11	11	1	50.0%
2012	Essendon	11 / 18	22	11	11	0	50.0%	—	—	—	—	—	22	11	11	0	50.0%															
2013	Essendon	9 / 18 (Note: Essendon originally finished 7th, but were relegated to 9th due to irregularities in its supplements program during the 2012 season..)	21	14	7	0	66.7%	—	—	—	—	—	21	14	7	0	66.7%															
2015	Essendon	15 / 18 (Note: Hird resigned as senior coach following the club's round 20 match against Adelaide; Essendon was 15th at the time of his resignation.)	19	5	14	0	26.3%	—	—	—	—	—	19	5	14	0	26.3%															
Career			84	41	42	1	49.4%	1	0	1	0	0.0%	85	41	43	1	48.8%															

== Honours and achievements ==
Team

- 2× AFL premiership player (Essendon): 1993, 2000 (c)
- 4× McClelland Trophy (Essendon): 1993, 1999, 2000, 2001

Individual

- Australian Football Hall of Fame (inducted 2011)
- Essendon Football Club Team of the Century (half-forward flank)
- Champions of Essendon: no. 3
- Essendon captain: 1998–2005
- Norm Smith Medal: 2000
- Brownlow Medal: 1996
- Australian Football Media Association Player of the Year: 1996
- 5× All-Australian team: 1995, 1996, 2000, 2001, 2003
- 5× Crichton Medal: 1994, 1995, 1996, 2003, 2007
- 2× Essendon leading goalkicker: 1995, 1996
- Jim Stynes Medal: 2000
- 2× Australia representative honours in international rules football: 2000 (c), 2004
- 3× Anzac Medal: 2000, 2003, 2004
- Yiooken Award: 2007
- AFL Rising Star nominee: 1993
