= David Flood =

David Flood may refer to:

- David Flood (footballer) (born 1969), Australian rules footballer
- David Flood (organist), English organist and choral conductor
