= Dreamtime at the 'G =

Annual Australian rules football match between Essendon and Richmond

- Dreamtime at the 'G match logo
- Teams: Essendon; Richmond
- First meeting: 9 July 2005
- Latest meeting: 22 May 2026
- Next meeting: 2027
- Broadcasters: Network Ten (2005–2011); Seven Network (2012–present)
- Stadiums: Melbourne Cricket Ground (2005–2019, 2022–present); Darwin Cricket Ground (2020); Perth Stadium (2021)

Statistics
- Total meetings: 21
- All-time series (Australian Football League only): Richmond – 12 wins Essendon – 9 wins
- Largest victory: Richmond – 71 points (2 June 2018)

The Dreamtime at the 'G is an annual Australian rules football match between Australian Football League clubs Essendon and Richmond.

Since the 2007 season the match has been held annually on the Saturday night of the AFL's "Indigenous Round", also known as the Sir Doug Nicholls Round. The name of the match comes from the Australian Aboriginal term "Dreamtime" and "the 'G", a nickname for the Melbourne Cricket Ground (MCG) where the match usually takes place; it has been played away from the ground on two occasions, when the COVID-19 pandemic impacted football in Victoria.

The game draws one of the highest crowds of the home-and-away season, with an average crowd of over 70,000 since its inception (with the exception of rain-affected matches), and a record attendance of 85,656 in 2017. The winning club is awarded the "Kevin Sheedy Cup", and the best player on the ground is awarded the "Yiooken Award".

== History ==
Dreamtime at the 'G was first held in 2005, with the aim being to recognise the contribution of all Indigenous players to the AFL. It was held during NAIDOC Week.

From 2006, the Yiooken Award has been awarded to the player judged best on ground in the match.

In 2007, following the success of the match in 2005 and 2006, the AFL nominated a specific Indigenous Round (round 9), which has become an annual event in which the Dreamtime at the 'G match takes centre stage. The success of the annual match, which now usually features crowds in excess of 80,000, led to the two clubs agreeing to cement the match's official status for an additional decade in May 2016.

From 2016, the Indigenous Round was named after Sir Doug Nicholls, the only AFL player to have been knighted and the only Aboriginal person or AFL player to serve as a state governor. Each year, each player in all 18 clubs wears a specially-commissioned artwork by an Indigenous artist on their guernsey. In 2019, former Essendon player Michael Long was honoured during this round.

In 2020, the match was played at Darwin Cricket Groundl in Darwin, as it was not possible for the match to be played in Melbourne due to the city being locked down during the ongoing COVID-19 pandemic in Australia. In 2021, another COVID-19 lockdown in Victoria led to the AFL moving the fixture to Optus Stadium in Perth, which also held the Grand Final that year.

In 2024, it was announced that the 2025 edition would be held on a Friday night, in order to expand the game's importance and allow the Seven Network to continue to televise the match, as the network will not be televising any Saturday night matches from the 2025 AFL season onwards.

Logo for the relocated match in 2020.

Logo for the relocated match in 2021.

=== Notable matches ===
- Round 6, 2006, saw Richmond escape with a two-point victory over Essendon after Jarrad Oakley-Nicholls scored the match-winning behind with minutes remaining in the final quarter.
- Round 9, 2007: With just under five minutes remaining, Richmond had a 12-point lead, which was pulled back by Essendon to level the match at 84-apiece; the score was Richmond 12.12.(84) – Essendon 11.18.(84). Tigers full-forward Matthew Richardson thought he had kicked the match-winning goal, but a subsequent fifty-metre penalty was awarded after Richardson had pushed his opponent in the back prior to kicking the goal. Essendon kicked the last 1.2.(8) of the match to win the game by eight points and deny Richmond what would have been their first win of the 2007 season.
- Round 13, 2020, was notable due to the unique circumstances under which the game took place as a result of the stage four COVID-19 pandemic lockdowns in Melbourne which prevented the match from being played at the Melbourne Cricket Ground. The match was played at Darwin Cricket Ground in Darwin, with Richmond winning by twelve points. Shai Bolton, who designed the guernsey the Richmond players wore in this match, won the Yiooken Award for his best-on-ground performance.
- Similar to the year before, the Round 12, 2021, match saw a relocation of the match from Melbourne due to a COVID-19 lockdown, this time to Optus Stadium in Perth. Despite losing the match by 39 points, Essendon player Darcy Parish won the Yiooken Award for his record-breaking performance of 44 disposals. It was the most disposals in one match ever recorded by an Essendon player.
- Round 10, 2023, was notable for several reasons. Going into the match, Essendon's form, which was strong for the first five games, had diminished, partly due to numerous injuries, and consequently they entered the game with a four-game losing streak despite showing valour in these games. Richmond, on the other hand, had come off two convincing wins in a row, including an upset win against Geelong, and were comfortable favourites. More tellingly, though, Richmond had won the last 13 games against Essendon, with Essendon's last win against them being in 2014. In a relatively low-scoring affair, the game was close all day, with Richmond leading by three goals in the final quarter. Essendon managed to claw back the lead back by a couple of goals to trail by just 5 points with a few minutes to go. In the final minutes, a tenacious tackle by Essendon's Zach Merrett (whose 39-disposal game coincidentally won the Yiooken Award by a unanimous vote) brought down Richmond star Dustin Martin in Richmond's attacking half, an effort that commentator Jonathan Brown called "inspirational"; the tackle was enough to compromise the accuracy of Martin's kick. With less than a minute remaining, Essendon were able to rebound the ball into their forward 50. A centralising snap kick in Essendon's left pocket was marked by Essendon forward Sam Durham at the top of the goal square. With just a handful of seconds to go, Durham composed himself and kicked the match-winning goal to put Essendon a point ahead and seal the game.

== The Long Walk ==
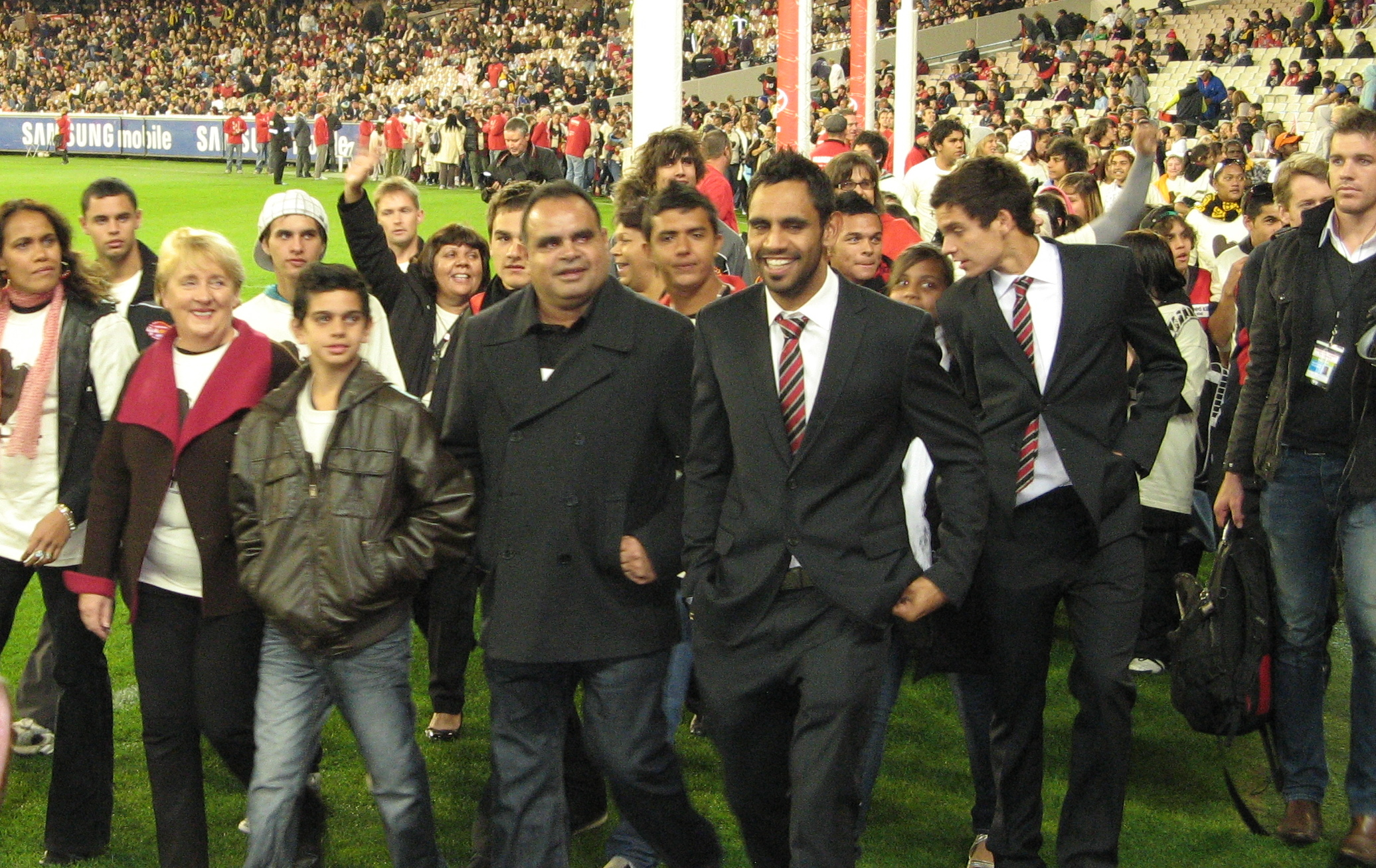
The Long Walk at the 2010 Dreamtime at the 'G match. Cathy Freeman (far left), Michael Long (centre-left) and Nathan Lovett-Murray (centre, in suit) are visible.

The match is associated with the pre-game commemoration events organised by The Long Walk, a charity inspired by Indigenous former Essendon player Michael Long, who walked halfway from Melbourne to Canberra in 2004 to get the lives of Aboriginal and Torres Strait Islander people back on the national agenda. He halted his walk after then Prime Minister John Howard agreed to talk to him.

On the day of the Dreamtime match, The Long Walk holds a community celebration featuring entertainment and activities as well as community organisation information stalls. Prior to the Dreamtime match, Long and several thousand other participants walk from Federation Square to the Melbourne Cricket Ground to promote reconciliation. In 2013, over 15,000 participants walked to the MCG. The walk has grown in stature and size, and in 2016 was attended by Prime Minister Malcolm Turnbull and the Leader of the Opposition, Bill Shorten.

== Curtain raisers ==
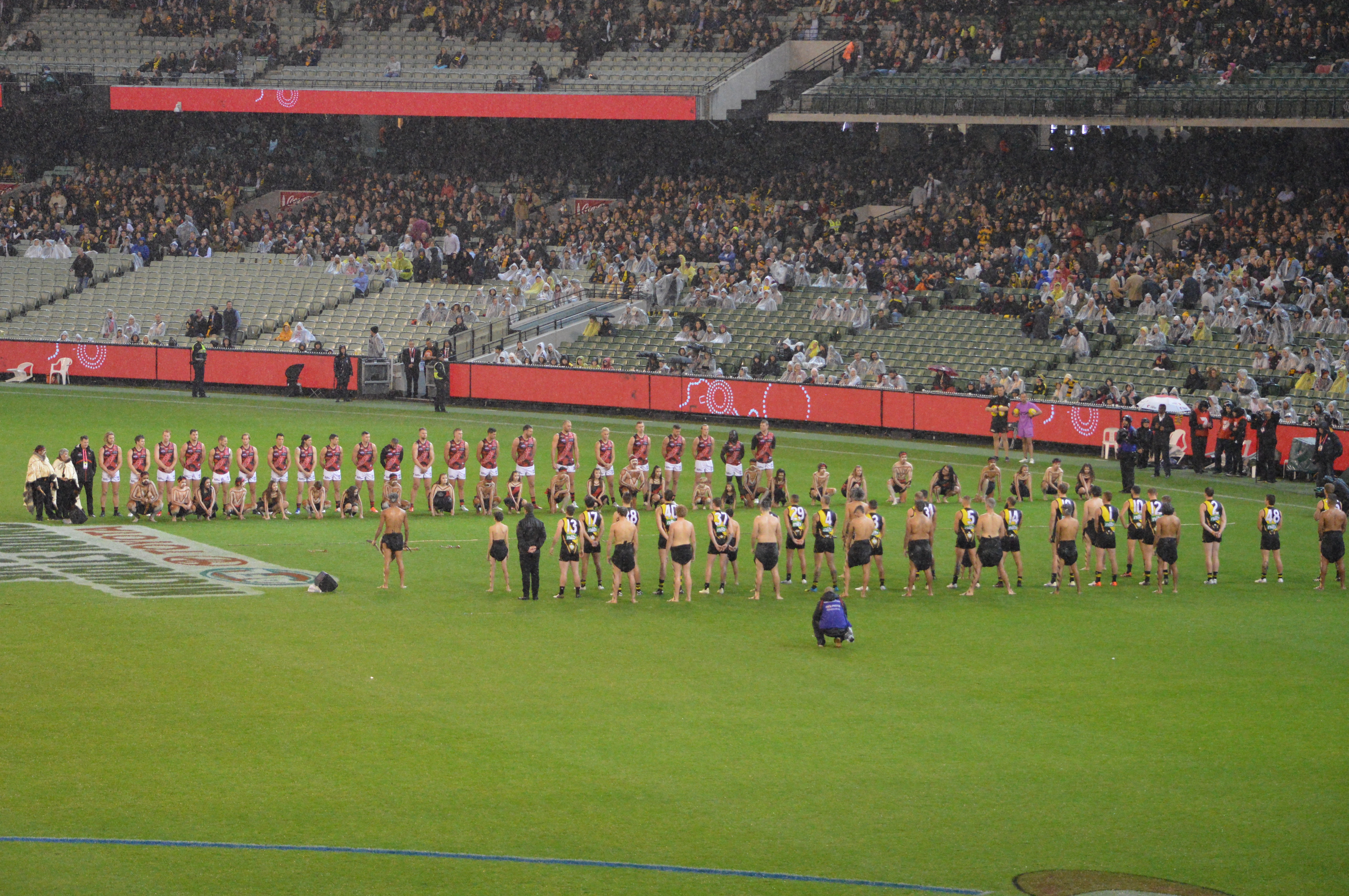
Players from both teams observe a war cry representing each club and performed by Indigenous people from local communities in 2019

A curtain raiser match is sometimes held between two Indigenous football teams from around Australia and its territories.

Year	Match/Series Name	Team		Team
2005		West Australian Clontarf Aboriginal Academy; Western Australia	vs	Victorian Indigenous; Victoria
2006	No curtain-raiser match, only entertainment and welcome ceremony			
2007		Tiwi Bombers; Tiwi Islands	vs	Rumbalara; Shepparton, Central Victoria
2008		Santa Teresa (Ltyentye Apurte); Alice Springs, Northern Territory	vs	Fitzroy Stars; Melbourne
2009		Imalu Tigers; Tiwi Islands	vs	Brambuk Eels; Western Victoria
2010	Rio Tinto Challenge Cup	Northern; Northern Australia	vs	Southern; Southern Australia

== Match results ==
	Year	Rd	Home Team	Score	Away Team	Score	Ground	Crowd	Result/Winner	M	H2H	YA
1	2005	15	Richmond	14.8 (92)	Essendon	9.12 (66)	Melbourne Cricket Ground	49,975	Richmond	26	+1	Not awarded
2	2006	6	Essendon	13.17 (95)	Richmond	13.19 (97)	Melbourne Cricket Ground	58,439	Richmond	2	+2	Dean Polo (Ric)
3	2007	9	Richmond	12.12 (84)	Essendon	12.20 (92)	Melbourne Cricket Ground	61,837	Essendon	8	+1	James Hird (Ess)
4	2008	9	Essendon	10.12 (72)	Richmond	16.14 (110)	Melbourne Cricket Ground	60,333	Richmond	38	+2	Nathan Foley (Ric)
5	2009	9	Richmond	12.13 (85)	Essendon	19.11 (125)	Melbourne Cricket Ground	73,625	Essendon	40	+1	Jason Winderlich (Ess)
6	2010	9	Essendon	19.16 (130)	Richmond	14.11 (95)	Melbourne Cricket Ground	64,709	Essendon	35		David Hille (Ess)
7	2011	9	Richmond	16.9 (105)	Essendon	13.11 (89)	Melbourne Cricket Ground	83,563	Richmond	16	+1	Trent Cotchin (Ric)
8	2012	8	Essendon	19.14 (128)	Richmond	15.19 (109)	Melbourne Cricket Ground	80,900	Essendon	19		Brett Deledio (Ric)
9	2013	9	Richmond	9.8 (62)	Essendon	13.13 (91)	Melbourne Cricket Ground	84,234	Essendon	29	+1	Jobe Watson (Ess)
10	2014	11	Essendon	15.14 (104)	Richmond	7.12 (54)	Melbourne Cricket Ground	74,664	Essendon	50	+2	Brendon Goddard (Ess)
11	2015	9	Richmond	10.12 (72)	Essendon	8.11 (59)	Melbourne Cricket Ground	83,804	Richmond	13	+1	Brandon Ellis (Ric)
12	2016	10	Essendon	10.7 (67)	Richmond	16.9 (105)	Melbourne Cricket Ground	56,948	Richmond	38		Dustin Martin (Ric)
13	2017	10	Richmond	11.15 (81)	Essendon	10.6 (66)	Melbourne Cricket Ground	85,656	Richmond	15	+1	Dustin Martin (Ric)
14	2018	11	Essendon	6.7 (43)	Richmond	17.12 (114)	Melbourne Cricket Ground	81,046	Richmond	71	+2	Shane Edwards (Ric)
15	2019	10	Richmond	10.13 (73)	Essendon	6.14 (50)	Melbourne Cricket Ground	80,176	Richmond	23	+3	Bachar Houli (Ric)
16	2020	13	Essendon	10.1 (61)	Richmond	10.13 (73)	Darwin Cricket Ground	5,401	Richmond	12	+4	Shai Bolton (Ric)
17	2021	12	Essendon	12.12 (84)	Richmond	19.9 (123)	Perth Stadium	55,656	Richmond	39	+5	Darcy Parish (Ess)
18	2022	10	Richmond	11.14 (80)	Essendon	7.6 (48)	Melbourne Cricket Ground	70,226	Richmond	32	+6	Dion Prestia (Ric)
19	2023	10	Essendon	10.11 (71)	Richmond	10.10 (70)	Melbourne Cricket Ground	79,300	Essendon	1	+5	Zach Merrett (Ess)
20	2024	11	Richmond	10.14 (74)	Essendon	12.14 (86)	Melbourne Cricket Ground	79,359	Essendon	12	+4	Jordan Ridley (Ess)
21	2025	11	Essendon	11.15 (81)	Richmond	8.10 (58)	Melbourne Cricket Ground	76,051	Essendon	23	+3	Nic Martin (Ess)
21	2026	11	Richmond	10.14 (74)	Essendon	7.14 (56)	Melbourne Cricket Ground	78,815	Richmond	18	+4	Darcy Parish (Ess)

Summary results
Club	Winning years	Total wins	Yiooken Awards	Total awards
Essendon	2007, 2009, 2010, 2012, 2013, 2014, 2023, 2024, 2025	9	2007, 2009, 2010, 2013, 2014, 2021, 2023, 2024, 2025, 2026	10
Richmond	2005, 2006, 2008, 2011, 2015, 2016, 2017, 2018, 2019, 2020, 2021, 2022, 2026	13	2006, 2008, 2011, 2012, 2015, 2016, 2017, 2018, 2019, 2020, 2022	11

== Kevin Sheedy Cup ==
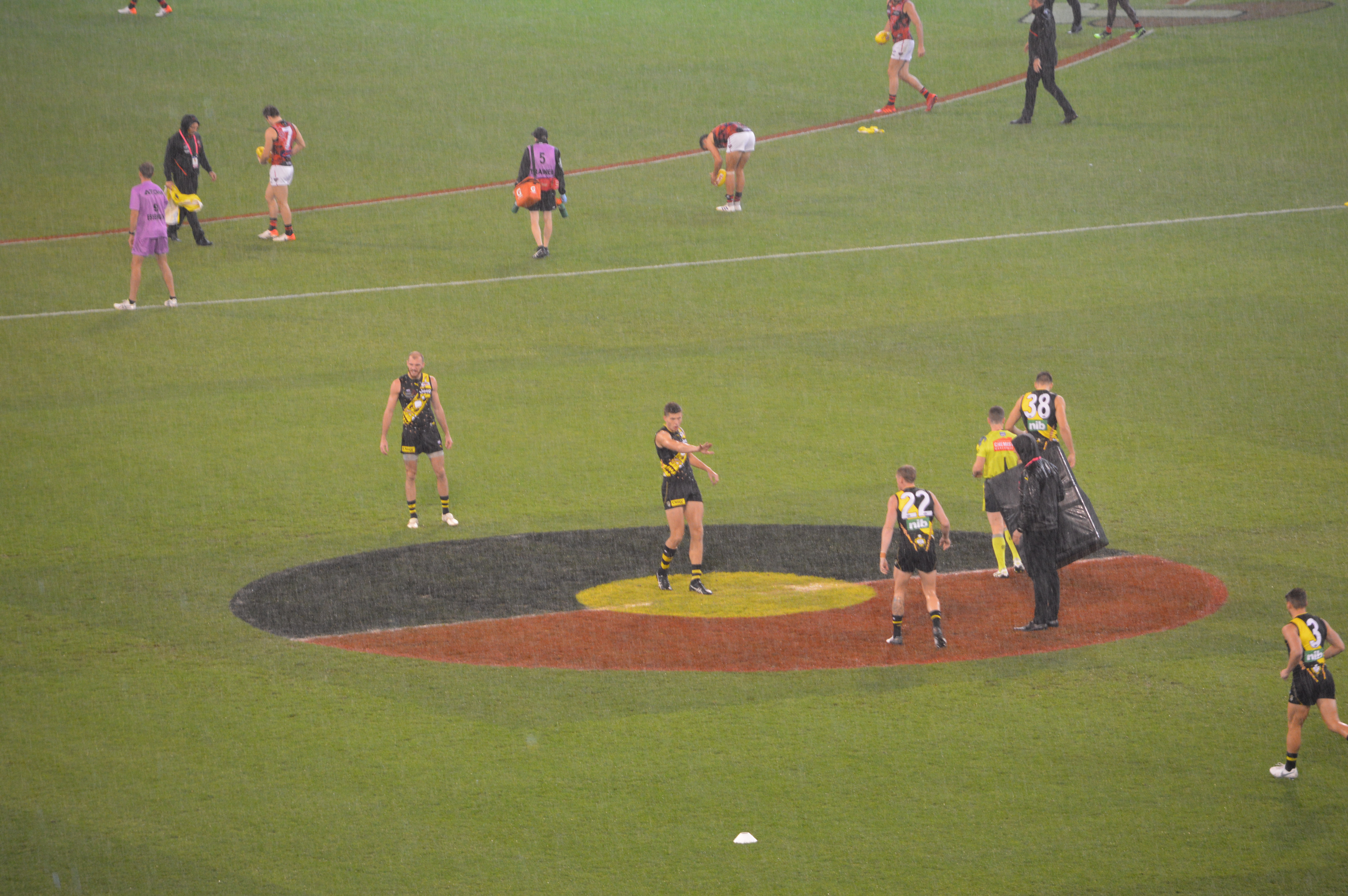
The centre circle is decorated with the colours of the Aboriginal flag in 2019

In 2005, Richmond and Essendon first competed for the Kevin Sheedy Cup. The cup has continued to be awarded to the winner of each Dreamtime at the 'G game.

Sheedy has a strong connection with both Essendon and Richmond, having played 251 games for Richmond, including their 1969, 1973 and 1974 premiership teams. He won the 1976 best & fairest award, captained the club in 1978, was named on their Team of the Century at left back-pocket and inducted into the Richmond Hall of Fame in 2002. He retired in 1979. He then went on to coach Essendon from 1981 to 2007, amassing 635 games as coach and led the club to premierships in 1984, 1985, 1993 & 2000. He was named as coach of the Essendon Team of the Century. He was a selector for the Indigenous Team of the Century and has championed indigenous football, reconciliation, and education.

== See also ==
- Indigenous Team of the Century
- Indigenous All-Stars (Australian rules football)
- List of individual match awards in the Australian Football League
