= Joe Misiti =

Australian rules footballer, born 1974

Personal information
- Born: 9 November 1974 (age 51)
- Original team: Keilor Park Football Club
- Debut: Round 23, 1992, Essendon vs. North Melbourne, at the MCG
- Height: 186 cm (6 ft 1 in)
- Weight: 89 kg (196 lb)

Playing career^{1}
| Years | Club | Games (Goals) |
| 1992–2004 | Essendon | 236 (94) |
- ^{1} Playing statistics correct to the end of 2004.

Career highlights
- AFL Premiership Player 1993, 2000; VFL/AFL Italian Team of the Century; AFL Rising Star nominee: 1993

Joe Misiti (born 9 November 1974) is a former Australian rules football player who played for the Essendon Football Club in the Australian Football League (AFL).

Originally from Keilor Park and of Italian descent, he made his AFL debut in 1992 and retired at the end of the 2004 premiership season with 236 games to his credit. Described as a "ball-magnet", Misiti was primarily a midfielder who was known for his quick handball and his ability to find space in tight situations. After being part of Essendon's 1993 premiership side, Misiti struggled to keep his place in the side in the next two years. However, he regained form and fitness in 1996 and came second in the team's best and fairest in 1997. Misiti was also part of Essendon's 2000 premiership side; and, after retirement, he became a member of the VFL/AFL Italian Team of the Century in 2007.

== Biography ==
Misiti grew up in East Keilor and attended Keilor Heights Primary School and Keilor Heights High School. Misiti grew up being an Essendon supporter and often got his father and uncle to take him to watch the team play. "They built me a little stool to stand on so I could watch from behind the cheer squad. They would sneak off for a couple of quiet ones and then come back and get me at the end of the day and we would have a kick on the ground," Misiti said. Noel Judkins, Essendon's then recruiting manager, witnessed Misiti playing in an Under–15 team as a centre half-back. Although Judkins was impressed with what he saw, Misiti was "a bit slack at training." Nevertheless, he continued to perform, playing for the Essendon Under–19s in the next season, and also won the best and fairest in the process. However, the under-age team was abolished in 1991, with Essendon's senior club list cut back to 45. "We kept 11 guys who were eligible for what would have been the under–19s," said Judkins. "Joey was probably the last guy we kept, because we were worried about his attitude. He had to convince [coach] Kevin Sheedy and the match committee that he was fair dinkum," something he managed to do.

It did not take long for Misiti to make his senior debut, named in the Essendon line-up in late 1992. In the same season, Misiti played in the reserves premiership, before being a part in Essendon's 1993 premiership winning team. Over the following seasons, Misiti—along with a few other teammates—lost fitness. "I thought I could carry a couple of extra kilos and that it wouldn't matter," Misiti said. "So in 1995 I had a good look at myself." His performances in 1996 and 1997 improved, coming in the top five of the best and fairest in both seasons. However, his form dipped to a new low in 1998, forcing his omission for the qualifying final. After a lean few years, Essendon became an AFL powerhouse in 1999, 2000 and 2001, winning the 2000 premiership, while they lost the preliminary final by a point in 1999 along with losing the 2001 Grand Final to Brisbane. He retired at the end of the 2004 season after playing in 236 games.

In 2005, he played in the Essendon District Football League (EDFL) for Keilor Park and became a member of the VFL/AFL Italian Team of the Century, named in 2007.

== Statistics ==
Legend
| G | Goals | K | Kicks | D | Disposals | T | Tackles |
| B | Behinds | H | Handballs | M | Marks |

| Season | Team | No. | Games | Totals | | | | | | | Averages (per game) | | | | | | |
| Season | Team | No. | Games | G | B | K | H | D | M | T | G | B | K | H | D | M | T |
|---|---|---|---|---|---|---|---|---|---|---|---|---|---|---|---|---|---|
| 1992 | Essendon | 52 | 2 | 0 | 1 | 20 | 29 | 49 | 11 | 0 | 0.0 | 0.5 | 10.0 | 14.5 | 24.5 | 5.5 | 0.0 |
| 1993† | Essendon | 24 | 23 | 12 | 13 | 350 | 212 | 562 | 90 | 23 | 0.5 | 0.6 | 15.2 | 9.2 | 24.4 | 3.9 | 1.0 |
| 1994 | Essendon | 24 | 16 | 6 | 3 | 199 | 126 | 325 | 48 | 16 | 0.4 | 0.2 | 12.4 | 7.9 | 20.3 | 3.0 | 1.0 |
| 1995 | Essendon | 24 | 22 | 9 | 11 | 284 | 207 | 491 | 88 | 15 | 0.4 | 0.5 | 12.9 | 9.4 | 22.3 | 4.0 | 0.7 |
| 1996 | Essendon | 24 | 22 | 9 | 11 | 292 | 207 | 499 | 56 | 30 | 0.4 | 0.5 | 13.3 | 9.4 | 22.7 | 2.5 | 1.4 |
| 1997 | Essendon | 24 | 18 | 4 | 4 | 238 | 203 | 441 | 69 | 25 | 0.2 | 0.2 | 13.2 | 11.3 | 24.5 | 3.8 | 1.4 |
| 1998 | Essendon | 24 | 19 | 6 | 4 | 214 | 179 | 393 | 64 | 29 | 0.3 | 0.2 | 11.3 | 9.4 | 20.7 | 3.4 | 1.5 |
| 1999 | Essendon | 24 | 18 | 8 | 4 | 246 | 191 | 437 | 64 | 27 | 0.4 | 0.2 | 13.7 | 10.6 | 24.3 | 3.6 | 1.5 |
| 2000† | Essendon | 24 | 25 | 14 | 9 | 312 | 313 | 625 | 92 | 61 | 0.6 | 0.4 | 12.5 | 12.5 | 25.0 | 3.7 | 2.4 |
| 2001 | Essendon | 24 | 16 | 8 | 3 | 206 | 166 | 372 | 58 | 26 | 0.5 | 0.2 | 12.9 | 10.4 | 23.3 | 3.6 | 1.6 |
| 2002 | Essendon | 24 | 15 | 6 | 5 | 189 | 168 | 357 | 80 | 41 | 0.4 | 0.3 | 12.6 | 11.2 | 23.8 | 5.3 | 2.7 |
| 2003 | Essendon | 24 | 21 | 6 | 4 | 185 | 160 | 345 | 56 | 37 | 0.3 | 0.2 | 8.8 | 7.6 | 16.4 | 2.7 | 1.8 |
| 2004 | Essendon | 24 | 19 | 6 | 3 | 153 | 115 | 268 | 52 | 32 | 0.3 | 0.2 | 8.1 | 6.1 | 14.1 | 2.7 | 1.7 |
| Career | | | 236 | 94 | 75 | 2888 | 2276 | 5164 | 828 | 362 | 0.4 | 0.3 | 12.2 | 9.6 | 21.9 | 3.5 | 1.5 |
