= Ollerenshaw =

Ollerenshaw may refer to:

- Eric Ollerenshaw (born 1950), British politician
- Kathleen Ollerenshaw (1912–2014), British mathematician and politician
- Keith Ollerenshaw (1928–2016), Australian long-distance runner
- Maggie Ollerenshaw (born 1949), British actress
- Peggy Ollerenshaw, fictional character in the sitcom Hi-de-Hi!
- Scott Ollerenshaw (born 1968), Australian association football player

== See also ==
- Rick Olarenshaw
