= Allan Hird Jr. =

Australian rules footballer

Allan Hird

Personal information
- Full name: Allan Thomas Hird Jr.
- Born: 30 March 1946 (age 80)
- Original team: Stawell
- Height: 183 cm (6 ft 0 in)
- Weight: 73 kg (161 lb)

Playing career^{1}
Years	Club	Games (Goals)
1966–1967	Essendon	4 (0)
- ^{1} Playing statistics correct to the end of 1967.

Allan Thomas Hird Jr. (born 30 March 1946) is a former Australian rules footballer who played with Essendon in the Victorian Football League (VFL).

Hird joined Essendon in 1964, from Stawell, but didn't make his debut until 1966 when he came on as the 20th man in the final quarter of a game against St Kilda. He played his football as a centreman and played two more games that year but made just one more appearance, in the 1967 VFL season. During his time at the club, his father Allan Hird senior was an Essendon committeeman.

After a season with Heidelberg, Hird moved to Canberra, serving as captain-coach of Eastlake from 1969 to 1971.

He settled in Canberra, where he worked in the ACT Public Service. He remained involved in local football and from 1989 to 1991 was president of AFL Canberra.

His son, James Hird, also played for and coached Essendon.
