= Paul Hills =

Australian rules footballer

Personal information
- Born: 20 September 1972 (age 54)
- Original team: North Ballarat (Ballarat FL)
- Draft: No. 93, 1988 national draft
- Height: 185 cm (6 ft 1 in)
- Weight: 78 kg (172 lb)

Playing career^{1}
Years	Club	Games (Goals)
1991–1996	Essendon	63 (11)
- ^{1} Playing statistics correct to the end of 1996.

Career highlights
- AFL premiership player: 1993

Paul Hills (born 20 September 1972) is a former Australian rules footballer who played with Essendon in the Australian Football League (AFL).

Hills usually played on the wing and after being recruited from North Ballarat he joined Essendon for the 1991 season, despite not having played a reserves game. In 1993, he was part of the premiership side, playing 20 games during the year for 357 disposals.

The following season, Hills suffered form and injury problems; until he was delisted in 1996, he managed to play just 11 more games.

In 2024, Paul Hills was named at Number 100 in Don The Stat’s Countdown of the Best 100 Essendon players since 1980.

== Statistics ==
Legend
G	Goals	K	Kicks	D	Disposals	T	Tackles
B	Behinds	H	Handballs	M	Marks

Season	Team	No.	Games	Totals							Averages (per game)							Votes
Season	Team	No.	Games	G	B	K	H	D	M	T	G	B	K	H	D	M	T	Votes
1991	Essendon	49	14	3	3	95	109	204	34	20	0.2	0.2	6.8	7.8	14.6	2.4	1.4	1
1992	Essendon	33	17	3	6	145	162	307	56	25	0.2	0.4	8.5	9.5	18.1	3.3	1.5	6
1993†	Essendon	11	20	3	6	192	165	357	49	27	0.2	0.3	9.6	8.3	17.9	2.5	1.4	0
1994	Essendon	11	8	1	1	51	48	99	16	8	0.1	0.1	6.4	6.0	12.4	2.0	1.0	0
1995	Essendon	11	3	1	1	18	14	32	4	1	0.3	0.3	6.0	4.7	10.7	1.3	0.3	0
1996	Essendon	11	1	0	0	1	5	6	0	0	0.0	0.0	1.0	5.0	6.0	0.0	0.0	0
Career			63	11	17	502	503	1005	159	81	0.2	0.3	8.0	8.0	16.0	2.5	1.3	7
