= David Calthorpe =

Australian rules footballer

Personal information
- Full name: David Calthorpe
- Born: 17 August 1973 (age 53)
- Original team: East Keilor
- Height: 179 cm (5 ft 10 in)
- Weight: 94 kg (207 lb)
- Position: Midfielder

Playing career^{1}
| Years | Club | Games (Goals) |
| 1992–1998 | Essendon | 92 (58) |
| 1999 | Brisbane Lions | 9 (2) |
| 2000 | Kangaroos | 13 (10) |
| Total | | 114 (70) |
- ^{1} Playing statistics correct to the end of 2000.

David Calthorpe (born 17 August 1973) is a former Australian rules footballer who played for Essendon, the Brisbane Lions and the Kangaroos in the Australian Football League (AFL).

Calthorpe was an on-baller and in his first ever State of Origin game for Victoria, he won the E. J. Whitten Medal. For the Bombers, he played 92 games from the time of his debut in 1992, winning a premiership medal in his second season. He was picked up by Brisbane at pick one in the 1999 pre-season draft but only played 9 games for the club before moving to the Kangaroos in 2000, for what turned out to be his final season of football.

He is best remembered for a solo play, late in the third quarter of the 1993 AFL Grand Final, where he collected the ball from the centre bounce and within 10 seconds, had goaled from a distance of 55 metres, effectively killing the game as a contest.

== Statistics ==
Legend
| G | Goals | K | Kicks | D | Disposals | T | Tackles |
| B | Behinds | H | Handballs | M | Marks |

| Season | Team | No. | Games | Totals | | | | | | | Averages (per game) | | | | | | | Votes |
| Season | Team | No. | Games | G | B | K | H | D | M | T | G | B | K | H | D | M | T | Votes |
|---|---|---|---|---|---|---|---|---|---|---|---|---|---|---|---|---|---|---|
| 1992 | Essendon | 48 | 2 | 2 | 3 | 9 | 3 | 12 | 0 | 1 | 1.0 | 1.5 | 4.5 | 1.5 | 6.0 | 0.0 | 0.5 | 0 |
| 1993† | Essendon | 48 | 11 | 10 | 14 | 80 | 63 | 143 | 25 | 15 | 0.9 | 1.3 | 7.3 | 5.7 | 13.0 | 2.3 | 1.4 | 0 |
| 1994 | Essendon | 14 | 17 | 13 | 13 | 176 | 113 | 289 | 46 | 33 | 0.8 | 0.8 | 10.4 | 6.6 | 17.0 | 2.7 | 1.9 | 3 |
| 1995 | Essendon | 14 | 17 | 9 | 10 | 168 | 74 | 242 | 42 | 14 | 0.5 | 0.6 | 9.9 | 4.4 | 14.2 | 2.5 | 0.8 | 3 |
| 1996 | Essendon | 14 | 16 | 7 | 13 | 141 | 50 | 191 | 24 | 19 | 0.4 | 0.8 | 8.8 | 3.1 | 11.9 | 1.5 | 1.2 | 1 |
| 1997 | Essendon | 14 | 8 | 4 | 3 | 69 | 55 | 124 | 27 | 6 | 0.5 | 0.4 | 8.6 | 6.9 | 15.5 | 3.4 | 0.8 | 0 |
| 1998 | Essendon | 14 | 21 | 13 | 10 | 264 | 112 | 376 | 92 | 24 | 0.6 | 0.5 | 12.6 | 5.3 | 17.9 | 4.4 | 1.1 | 8 |
| 1999 | Brisbane Lions | 48 | 9 | 2 | 0 | 63 | 21 | 84 | 18 | 4 | 0.2 | 0.0 | 7.0 | 2.3 | 9.3 | 2.0 | 0.4 | 0 |
| 2000 | Kangaroos | 17 | 13 | 10 | 3 | 53 | 43 | 96 | 14 | 19 | 0.8 | 0.2 | 4.1 | 3.3 | 7.4 | 1.1 | 1.5 | 0 |
| Career | | | 114 | 70 | 69 | 1023 | 534 | 1557 | 288 | 135 | 0.6 | 0.6 | 9.0 | 4.7 | 13.7 | 2.5 | 1.2 | 15 |
