= David Flood (footballer) =

Australian rules footballer and coach

Personal information
- Full name: David Flood
- Born: 22 February 1969 (age 57); Nhill
- Height: 188 cm (6 ft 2 in)
- Weight: 82 kg (181 lb)
- Position: Utility

Playing career^{1}
Years	Club	Games (Goals)
1986–95	Essendon	58 (36)
1996-97	Central District	19 (unknown)
- ^{1} Playing statistics correct to the end of 1995.

David Flood (born 22 February 1969) is a former Australian rules footballer who played for Essendon in the Victorian/Australian Football League (VFL/AFL).

Flood, a Nhill recruit, struggled with injuries during his time at Essendon. He was primarily a key forward but was used often as a defender. After playing under-19s football with Essendon, Flood made his league debut in 1986 and kicked two goals on debut against St Kilda at Windy Hill. As the club had won the previous two VFL premierships, Flood found it difficult to establish a place in the team and managed only 15 games in his first four seasons. He played his most regular senior football in 1991 and 1992 with 27 appearances. In 1993, despite participating in the Semi Final and Preliminary Final wins, Flood was omitted from the winning Grand Final side.

Following the end of his career with Essendon, Flood played briefly with South Australian National Football League (SANFL) club Central District.

Returning to Essendon in 1999, Flood became the club's Development and Welfare Coordinator. In 2004 he left Essendon to accept the senior coaching job at Coburg, vacated by Paul Spargo. He was coach for two seasons and then coached the Calder Cannons to the 2007 TAC Cup premiership. In 2008 he was appointed as a development coach at Hawthorn. In 2025 he joined Mornington Peninsula Football Netball League (MPNFL) club Sorrento as assistant senior coach, and is yet to sign for 2027..
