= 1993 AFL Grand Final =

Grand final of the 1993 Australian Football League season

Carlton	Essendon
13.11 (89)	20.13 (133)
	1	2	3	4
CAR	1.2 (8)	5.2 (32)	10.5 (65)	13.11 (89)
ESS	5.8 (38)	10.9 (69)	16.11 (107)	20.13 (133)
- Date: 25 September 1993
- Stadium: Melbourne Cricket Ground
- Attendance: 96,862
- Favourite: Carlton

Ceremonies
- Pre-match entertainment: Maroochy Barambah, Archie Roach and Yothu Yindi
- National anthem: Maroochy Barambah

Accolades
- Norm Smith Medallist: Michael Long (Essendon)
- Jock McHale Medallist: Kevin Sheedy

Broadcast in Australia
- Network: Seven Network
- Commentators: Sandy Roberts (host and commentator); Ian Robertson (commentator); Gerard Healy (expert commentator); Bernie Quinlan (boundary commentator); Ross Glendinning (boundary commentator); Don Scott (analyst); Peter McKenna (analyst)

The 1993 AFL Grand Final was an Australian rules football game contested between the Carlton Football Club and Essendon Football Club, held at the Melbourne Cricket Ground in Melbourne on 25 September 1993. It was the 97th annual grand final of the Australian Football League (formerly the Victorian Football League), staged to determine the premiers for the 1993 AFL season. The match, attended by 96,862 spectators, was won by Essendon by a margin of 44 points, marking that club's 15th premiership victory.

== Background ==
Neither side was considered a strong premiership prospect at the beginning of the season, as neither side had made the finals in 1992. Essendon was considered too young and inexperienced, while Carlton, despite having some of the best key-position players in the competition, were considered too slow across the ground.

However, at the conclusion of the home and away season, Essendon had finished first on the AFL ladder with 13 wins 6 losses and a draw, winning the McClelland Trophy after having been sitting in seventh position as late as round 15. Carlton had also finished with 13 wins, 6 losses and a draw (the two teams having played in a tied game in round 2), but finished just behind Essendon on percentage. Only a game and a half separated Essendon in first position from Geelong in seventh position.

In the finals, the Bombers were defeated by Carlton by two points in the Qualifying final before defeating West Coast in the second semi-final to advance to the preliminary final. In this game they came out of nowhere to win a game that had seemed out of reach when trailing the Adelaide Crows by 42 points at half time. The Bombers charged home in the second half in that game, kicking 11 goals to 2 to win by 11 points, advancing to the grand final. Carlton, after their win over the Bombers in the qualifying final, defeated Adelaide in the second semi-final to advance to the grand final.

This was Essendon's first appearance in a grand final since losing the 1990 AFL Grand Final, whilst it was Carlton's first since winning the 1987 VFL Grand Final, and it was their first clash in a VFL/AFL Grand final since 1968.

In the week leading up to the Grand final, Essendon's Gavin Wanganeen was awarded the Brownlow Medal. Also during that week, Essendon caused a sensation in omitting Derek Kickett from the team. Kickett had played every game of the season up to that point but had lost form during the finals series.

Carlton entered the grand final as warm favourites, even though Essendon finished on top with a percentage margin of 1.5 against the Blues. The Bombers played more a younger side compared to them.

Carlton were forced to make a late change when veteran defender Peter Dean was ruled out through injury. Essendon coach Kevin Sheedy put Dean Wallis and Mark Harvey into the side at the expense of Kickett and David Flood. The Bombers played a second generation of 'Baby Bombers' for the grand final, with seven Essendon players—Gavin Wanganeen, David Calthorpe, Dustin Fletcher, Rick Olarenshaw, Mark Mercuri, James Hird and Joe Misiti—all being under the age of 21.

As 1993 was proclaimed by the United Nations as the International Year of the World's Indigenous People, the Grand Final pre-match entertainment featured some prominent Australian indigenous musicians: Gunditjmara/Bundjalung singer/songwriter Archie Roach, Turrbal mezzo-soprano Maroochy Barambah and Northern Territory–based band Yothu Yindi, whose indigenous members were of the Yolngu tribe. Barambah performed "Waltzing Matilda" and the national anthem. She was widely panned for her performance, falling behind and dropping almost an entire verse out of sequence with the orchestral track.

== Match summary ==
Team	1	2	3	4	Total
Carlton	1.2	5.2	10.5	13.11	13.11 (89)
Essendon	5.8	10.9	16.11	20.13	20.13 (133)

Essendon carried their form from the preliminary final into the grand final against the Blues, with the individual brilliance of Michael Long being the most memorable feature (although a famous long running 'goal' kicked by Long in the first quarter looked to be touched on the goal line by Stephen Silvagni and remains a controversial talking point to this day). The Norm Smith Medal was awarded to Long for being judged the best player afield, with 33 disposals and 2 goals.

Stephen Kernahan tried hard for the Blues with 7 goals, but his side barely threatened after being down by 5 goals at the first change. Essendon had thirteen scoring shots to three by the Blues in the first quarter to set up their win. Paul Salmon kicked 5 goals for the Bombers.

== Teams ==
Carlton	Essendon

Carlton
B:	7 Brett Ratten	1 Stephen Silvagni	5 Andrew McKay
HB:	39 Ang Christou	14 Michael Sexton	13 Milham Hanna
C:	9 Brett Sholl	2 Greg Williams	20 Fraser Brown
HF:	31 Tom Alvin	11 Earl Spalding	22 Tim Powell
F:	38 Rohan Welsh	4 Stephen Kernahan (c)	17 Brent Heaver
Foll:	44 Justin Madden	21 Craig Bradley	12 Adrian Gleeson
Int:	25 Mark Athorn	33 Matthew Hogg	
Coach:	David Parkin		

Essendon
B:	4 Gavin Wanganeen	31 Dustin Fletcher	21 Dean Wallis
HB:	29 David Grenvold	1 Mark Harvey	26 Mark Thompson (c)
C:	47 Rick Olarenshaw	38 Sean Denham	11 Paul Hills
HF:	2 Mark Mercuri	5 James Hird	24 Joe Misiti
F:	32 Tim Watson	3 Paul Salmon	13 Michael Long
Foll:	19 Peter Somerville	10 Gary O'Donnell	8 Darren Bewick
Int:	7 Chris Daniher	48 David Calthorpe	
Coach:	Kevin Sheedy		

== Scorecard ==
Grand Final
Saturday, 25 September 2:30pm	Essendon	def.	Carlton	MCG (crowd: 96,862)	Report
5.8 (38); 10.9 (69); 16.11 (107); 20.13 (133)	Q1; Q2; Q3; Final	1.2 (8); 5.2 (32); 10.5 (65); 13.11 (89)	Umpires: Goldspink, Carey; Norm Smith Medal: Michael Long (Essendon); Television broadcast: Seven Network; National anthem: Maroochy Barambah
Salmon 5 Mercuri 3 Hird, Long 2 Harvey, Wanganeen, C. Daniher, Bewick, Wallis, Misiti, Denham, Calthorpe 1	Goals	7 Kernahan; 2 Welsh; 1 Williams, Heaver, Bradley, Alvin
Long, O'Donnell, Salmon, Mercuri, Thompson, Harvey, Olarenshaw, Wanganeen	Best	Kernahan, Hogg, Bradley, Williams, Madden, McKay
Nil	Injuries	Nil
Nil	Reports	Nil

== Media coverage ==
The 1993 AFL Grand Final has the ignominious honour of being the lowest TV ratings of any AFL grand final since TV records have been kept.

== Bibliography ==
- Atkinson, Graeme; Atkinson, Brant (2009). The Complete Book of AFL Finals (4th ed.). Scoresby, Victoria: The Five Mile Press. ISBN 9781742112756.

== See also ==
- 1993 AFL season
