= Mark Mercuri =

Australian rules footballer, born 1974

Personal information
- Born: 21 February 1974 (age 52)
- Original team: Keilor Park
- Debut: Round 10, 23 May 1992, Essendon vs. Carlton, at Princes Park
- Height: 178 cm (5 ft 10 in)
- Weight: 77 kg (170 lb)

Playing career^{1}
Years	Club	Games (Goals)
1992–2004	Essendon	207 (242)
- ^{1} Playing statistics correct to the end of 2004.

Career highlights
- Premiership player 1993, 2000; All Australian 1999; W. S. Crichton Medal 1999; AFL ANZAC Medal 1999; VFL/AFL Italian Team of the Century 2007; AFL Rising Star nominee: 1993

Mark Mercuri (born 21 February 1974) is a former professional Australian rules football player who played for the Essendon Football Club in the Australian Football League. He played in the 1993 premiership winning team which defeated Carlton and in the 2000 premiership team which defeated Melbourne. In the 1999 AFL season, Mercuri was one of the premier players of the competition, finishing runner-up in the Brownlow Medal, and earning a lucrative and rarely heard-of 5-year contract.

Mercuri played his 200th AFL game in round three, 2004 against West Coast in the match best known for James Hird's match-winning goal which broke a 131–all deadlock with less than a minute remaining. He retired following Essendon's 10-point semi-final defeat to Geelong at the Melbourne Cricket Ground.

In 2005, there was talk of a comeback, with Mercuri contemplating nominating for the pre-season draft. This never eventuated.

In 2006 he played for Airport West in the Essendon District Football League.

== Playing statistics ==
Season	Team	No.	Games	Totals							Averages (per game)						
Season	Team	No.	Games	G	B	K	H	D	M	T	G	B	K	H	D	M	T
1992	Essendon	45	3	1	4	22	14	36	9	2	0.3	1.3	7.3	4.7	12.0	3.0	0.7
1993†	Essendon	2	20	25	10	251	197	448	106	44	1.3	0.5	12.6	9.9	22.4	5.3	2.2
1994	Essendon	2	13	16	7	143	107	250	61	21	1.2	0.5	11.0	8.2	19.2	4.7	1.6
1995	Essendon	2	22	36	25	268	217	485	125	32	1.6	1.1	12.2	9.9	22.0	5.7	1.5
1996	Essendon	2	21	37	25	244	200	444	115	32	1.8	1.2	11.6	9.5	21.1	5.5	1.5
1997	Essendon	2	11	12	10	136	66	202	47	15	1.1	0.9	12.4	6.0	18.4	4.3	1.4
1998	Essendon	2	20	24	14	224	141	365	112	27	1.2	0.7	11.2	7.1	18.3	5.6	1.4
1999	Essendon	2	21	32	19	256	200	456	103	31	1.5	0.9	12.2	9.5	21.7	4.9	1.5
2000†	Essendon	2	20	32	19	208	152	360	92	33	1.6	1.0	10.4	7.6	18.0	4.6	1.7
2001	Essendon	2	20	10	10	164	153	317	70	34	0.5	0.5	8.2	7.7	15.9	3.5	1.7
2002	Essendon	2	11	7	9	101	93	194	50	21	0.6	0.8	9.2	8.5	17.6	4.5	1.9
2003	Essendon	2	16	7	6	126	99	225	74	32	0.4	0.4	7.9	6.2	14.1	4.6	2.0
2004	Essendon	2	9	3	0	49	39	88	26	21	0.3	0.0	6.5	4.3	9.8	2.9	2.3
Career			207	242	158	2192	1678	3870	990	345	1.2	0.8	10.6	8.1	18.7	4.8	1.7
