= Rick Olarenshaw =

Australian rules footballer

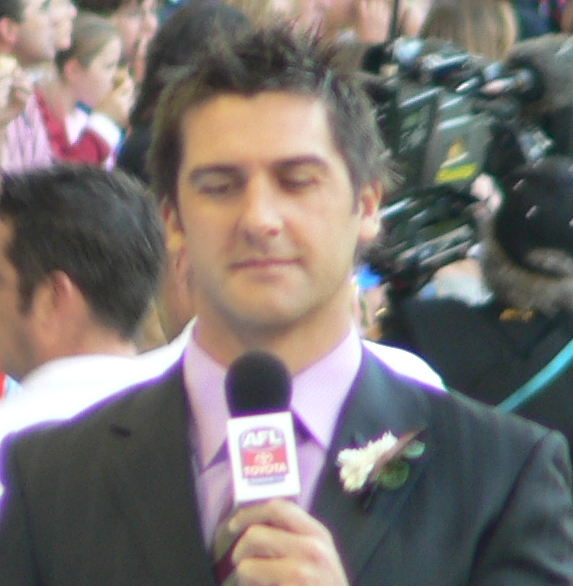

Personal information
- Born: 1 February 1973 (age 53)
- Original team: Keilor
- Debut: Round 3, 12 April 1993, Essendon vs. Collingwood, at Melbourne Cricket Ground
- Height: 182 cm (6 ft 0 in)
- Weight: 80 kg (176 lb)

Playing career^{1}
Years	Club	Games (Goals)
1993–1998	Essendon	77 (14)
1999–2000	Collingwood	5 (0)
2001	Kangaroos	1 (0)
Total		83 (14)
- ^{1} Playing statistics correct to the end of 2001.

Career highlights
- Essendon premiership side 1993; AFL Rising Star nominee: 1993

Rick Olarenshaw (born 1 February 1973) is a former Australian rules footballer in the Australian Football League.

He was formerly a boundary rider for Network Seven until being replaced by Matthew Richardson.

== Playing career ==
=== Essendon ===
Olarenshaw was recruited from Keilor in 1990 to the Essendon Football Club, where he won the under-19s best and fairest in 1991. He made his senior AFL debut in 1993 with the Bombers and enjoyed a quick rise that year. The left-foot wingman was an important player in the 1993 Bombers premiership side (known as the "Baby Bombers").

Over the following seasons he suffered numerous injuries, particularly to his rib and back, but he went on to enjoy a good season in 1997.

=== Later career/trades ===
Olarenshaw was traded to Collingwood (instead of his preferred club, the Kangaroos) at the end of 1998 after agreeing to leave Essendon. Olarenshaw was disillusioned by the new surroundings at Collingwood and suffered injuries that restricted him to just five games with the club. At the end of 2000, he was traded to the Kangaroos, but he managed only one game before announcing his retirement in 2001.

=== Bali sex scandal ===
In October 2024, it was revealed that Olarenshaw was linked to a Bali massage parlour that was allegedly offering illegal sexual services through its employees. While in Australia such a service would generally be considered legal, it is illegal in Indonesia. According to Indonesian law, police charged the pair under pornography laws, which can carry up to 12 years in jail.

== Statistics ==
Legend
G	Goals	K	Kicks	D	Disposals	T	Tackles
B	Behinds	H	Handballs	M	Marks

Season	Team	No.	Games	Totals							Averages (per game)							Votes
Season	Team	No.	Games	G	B	K	H	D	M	T	G	B	K	H	D	M	T	Votes
1993†	Essendon	47	16	5	5	207	118	325	75	21	0.3	0.3	12.9	7.4	20.3	4.7	1.3	0
1994	Essendon	47	10	1	1	70	58	128	25	12	0.1	0.1	7.0	5.8	12.8	2.5	1.2	3
1995	Essendon	47	11	3	2	112	72	184	42	4	0.3	0.2	10.2	6.5	16.7	3.8	0.4	2
1996	Essendon	47	8	1	0	96	76	172	46	7	0.1	0.0	12.0	9.5	21.5	5.8	0.9	1
1997	Essendon	47	15	2	2	141	117	258	52	23	0.1	0.1	9.4	7.8	17.2	3.5	1.5	0
1998	Essendon	47	17	2	5	140	122	262	50	23	0.1	0.3	8.2	7.2	15.4	2.9	1.4	0
1999	Collingwood	8	5	0	1	28	29	57	13	10	0.0	0.2	5.6	5.8	11.4	2.6	2.0	0
2000	Collingwood	8	0	—	—	—	—	—	—	—	—	—	—	—	—	—	—	—
2001	Kangaroos	47	1	0	0	2	2	4	1	0	0.0	0.0	2.0	2.0	4.0	1.0	0.0	0
Career			83	14	16	796	594	1390	304	100	0.2	0.2	9.6	7.2	16.7	3.7	1.2	6

== Post-playing career ==
Following the 2009 AFL season, he was removed as Channel 7's boundary rider in favour of Matthew Richardson.
