= Kevin Sheedy (Australian footballer) =

Australian rules footballer (born 1947)

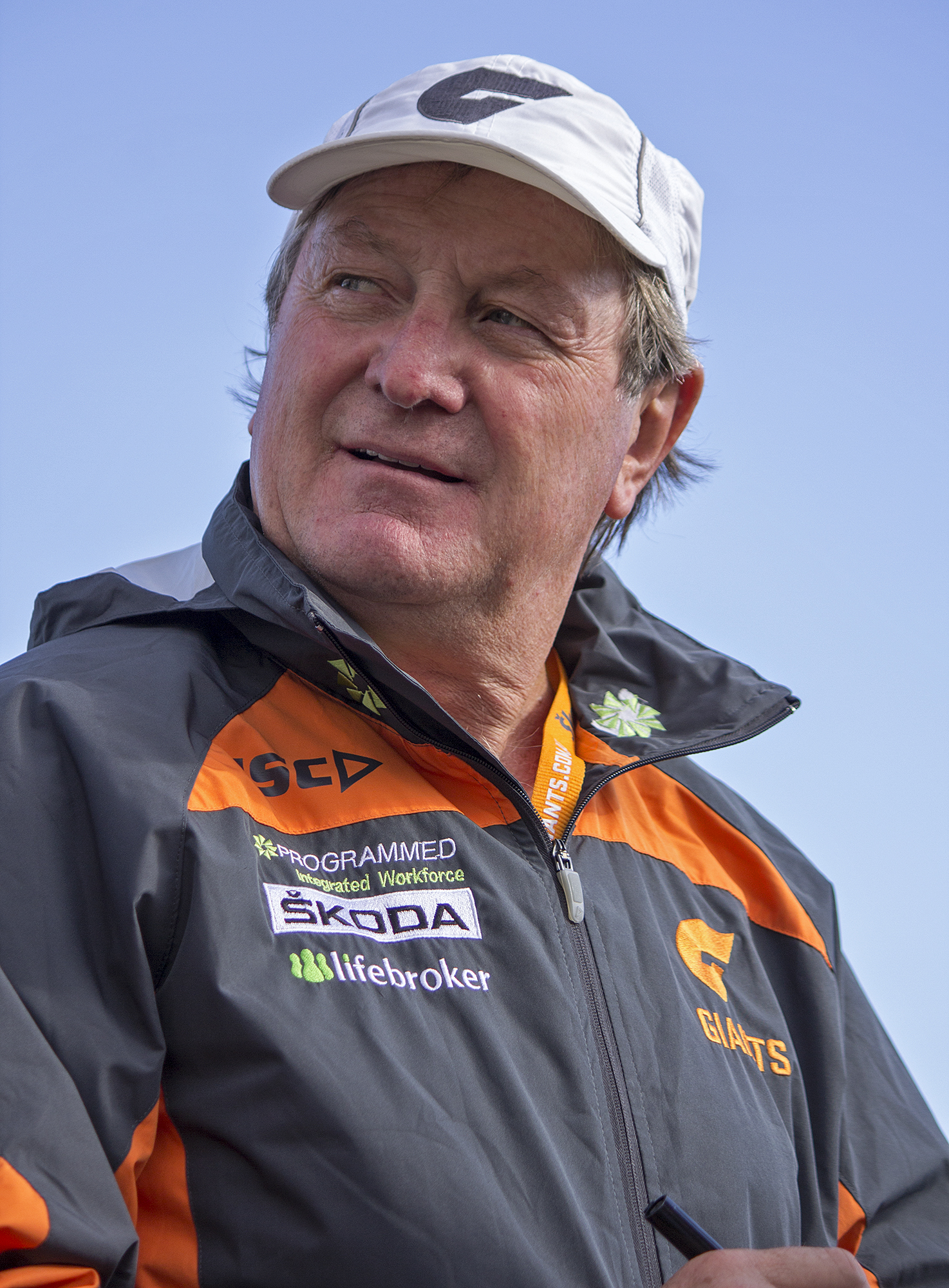
- Sheedy in March 2013

Personal information
- Full name: Kevin John Sheedy
- Nickname: Sheeds
- Born: 24 December 1947 (age 78); Melbourne, Australia
- Original team: Prahran (VFA)
- Height: 180 cm (5 ft 11 in)
- Weight: 81 kg (179 lb)
- Position: Defender

Playing career^{1}
Years	Club	Games (Goals)
1967–1979	Richmond	251 (91)

Representative team honours
Years	Team	Games (Goals)
	Victoria	8 (1)

International team honours
2005–2006	Australia (coach)	4

Coaching career^{3}
Years	Club	Games (W–L–D)
1981–2007	Essendon	634 (386–242–6)
2012–2013	Greater Western Sydney	44 (3–41–0)
1985–1986	Victoria	4 (2–2–0)
- ^{1} Playing statistics correct to the end of 1979.^{3} Coaching statistics correct as of 2013.

Career highlights
- Player: 3x VFL premiership: 1969, 1973, 1974, 3x Championship of Australia championship: 1969, 1973, 1974; Richmond best and fairest: 1976; Media Association Player of the Year: 1974; Richmond captain: 1978; Richmond Team of the Century (back pocket); Richmond Hall of Fame; Representative: National Football Carnival championship: 1972; Coaching: 4x VFL/AFL premiership: 1984, 1985, 1993, 2000; 3x All-Australian team: 1985, 1993, 2000; 2x VFL Team of the Year: 1984, 1985; Essendon Team of the Century; AFLCA Coaching Legend Award: 2014; Australian Football Hall of Fame: 28th Australian Football Hall of Fame Legend; Personal: Australian Sports Medal

Kevin John Sheedy AO (born 24 December 1947) is a former Australian rules football coach and player in the Australian Football League. He played and coached in a combined total of 929 games over 47 years from 1967 until 2013, which is a VFL/AFL record. Sheedy was inducted into the Australian Football Hall of Fame in 2008 and on 29 May 2018 was elevated to Legend status.

On the field, Sheedy played for Richmond in the Victorian Football League during the 1960s and 1970s, captaining the side in 1978 and winning three premierships. He then coached Essendon in the VFL/AFL for nearly three decades from 1981 until 2007, winning four premierships and earning acclaim for his unusual and creative approaches to promoting the club and the game. Sheedy conceived the first Anzac Day game in 1995 involving Collingwood and the club he coached at the time, Essendon. In 2009, Sheedy joined the newly formed Greater Western Sydney as its inaugural AFL coach, and he coached there from 2012 until 2013.

== Early life ==
Sheedy was born in Melbourne to devout Catholic parents. He played junior football with the local Try Boys society team while attending De La Salle College, Malvern, where future teammate Kevin Bartlett also spent a brief time. In 1963, he joined Prahran in the Victorian Football Association (VFA) and spent a year with the Under 19s. The next year, at the age of 16, he played senior football with the Two Blues and was soon a regular with the team. His home was in Melbourne's zone, so he took up an invitation to try out with the Demons, playing a few practice matches. But he did not feel comfortable there and returned to Prahran, playing in the club's Second Division premiership team in 1966.

Between 1969 and 1971, Sheedy undertook two years National Service with the Australian Army's 21 Construction Squadron, rising to the rank of corporal before discharge.

== Playing career ==
=== Richmond ===
Richmond showed early interest in Sheedy and received permission from Melbourne to speak with him. Sheedy jumped at the chance to join the up-and-coming Tigers, but a problem emerged when he shifted to Punt Road: the VFA refused to endorse his clearance due to a wider disagreement with the VFL relating to transfer fees. The VFA had weeks earlier set a minimum transfer fee of $3,000 for any of its players crossing to the VFL, and Sheedy's transfer fee was set even higher at $5,000; but the VFL considered this price so exorbitant that it responded by terminating its player transfer reciprocity agreement with the VFA, allowing Sheedy to move to Richmond without a clearance and without the transfer fee being paid. For crossing without a transfer, Sheedy was suspended from VFA competition for five years, but he remained free to play in the VFL during this time.

Another hurdle to jump was Billy Barrot. Barrot, a star player loved by the Tiger fans, played in Sheedy's favoured position of centre. However, Barrot was somewhat temperamental and prone to miss some matches. When he was injured in the third game of the year, Sheedy was selected in his place for his debut. However, Sheedy struggled and, after six games in the seniors, found himself back in the reserves for the remainder of the year. His season was ended by a serious knee injury that further put his future into doubt. From the sidelines, he watched Richmond win the premiership against Geelong.

Returned to fitness, Sheedy faced an enormous challenge in 1968. Coach Tom Hafey saw something in Sheedy's willingness to listen, his determination, and fierce desire for the ball. Placed in a back pocket, Sheedy consolidated his place in the senior side and then began to emerge as key player in the team's defence. He won a Victorian guernsey in 1969 and was a stand-out in the Tigers' three finals games, which culminated in a second flag in three years. He finished runner-up best and fairest to claim a remarkable turnaround in just two years.

By now, Sheedy's onfield persona marked him as a "villain" to be watched. He enjoyed niggling his opponents—physically and verbally—and seemed to be at the centre of every melee on the ground. Occasionally, his teammates blanched at some of his more theatrical attempts to win free kicks or fifteen-metre penalties, and he had the ability to whip opposing supporters into a frenzy. Since his injury, Sheedy had lived on the edge knowing that if he failed at Richmond it would be the end of the line because of the impending five-year suspension; however, he seemed to have an innate ability to read how far he could push the envelope, and indeed he was never reported during his career, a fact that would surprise most who saw him play.

He was now acknowledged the best in his position in the VFL and a key personality at Punt Road. A turning point came in the 1972 season when Sheedy played in Richmond's losing Grand Final team. In an earlier final, Sheedy had ruffled Carlton's captain-coach, John Nicholls, suggesting that he was finished as a player and that Richmond had the wood on the Blues. Nicholls and his men, stung by media criticism and the attitude of the Richmond players, played a whirlwind first half in the Grand Final, booting eighteen goals to led by 45 points. Sheedy, caught embarrassingly out of position a number of times, was switched to the unfamiliar position of ruck rover for the last half. Although the Tigers lost, Sheedy was a revelation in his new role.

Now permanently playing on the ball, he set up Richmond's Grand Final win in 1973 with three goals in the first quarter. He was judged best afield in the 1974 Grand Final with 30 disposals, accentuated by an uncanny piece of play in the second quarter. Sheedy marked next to the goalpost, went back to apparently take his kick from the impossible angle surrounded by opposition players, and then casually ran in and handballed over the head of the man on the mark to lone teammate in the goal square who booted the easiest goal of his life. It was this mixture of flamboyance and cunning that attracted the media to him, and Sheedy was voted player of the year by journalists.

Sheedy made good copy; during the season, Richmond had appointed him as full-time promotions officer, effectively making him the first professional footballer in the VFL. In time, all of the clubs would copy this appointment, and, by the 1980s, most clubs had a half dozen or so players employed as promotions officers. It was a bridge between the casual Saturday afternoon era and the age of true professionalism in the 1990s.

After finishing third in 1975, Richmond began a slide down the ladder. Sheedy's standard, however, remained high—in 1976, he won the best and fairest for the only time and received life membership of the club. However, he was shocked when his mentor and idol Tom Hafey left the club due to a lack of support at committee level.

In 1978, he was made captain, but his game was now struggling. After just four games the following year in the 1979 season, Sheedy read the writing on the wall when he started all of the matches on the bench, He then announced his retirement from his playing career later on in the 1979 season.

Late in his football-playing career, Sheedy also played a handful of district cricket games. A leg spinner, he played for Richmond's minor grades in 1976/77 as well as playing five First XI games in 1977/78; having been appointed captain of the football club, the football club's committee barred him from participating in the cricket final. Sheedy has described his reluctance to fight the committee's decision as one of his greatest regrets.

Sheedy played for Richmond Football Club from 1967 until 1979 for a total of 251 games and kicked 91 goals, and a member of the club's premiership teams in 1969, 1973 and 1974.

== Coaching career ==
=== Richmond ===
After Sheedy's retirement from his playing career, Sheedy immediately became an assistant coach at Richmond Football Club under senior coach Tony Jewell during the 1980 season where Richmond ended up winning the premiership in the 1980 Grand Final. It was clear he was preparing for a senior coaching role. He examined every facet of the club as the team went on to take the premiership.

=== Essendon ===
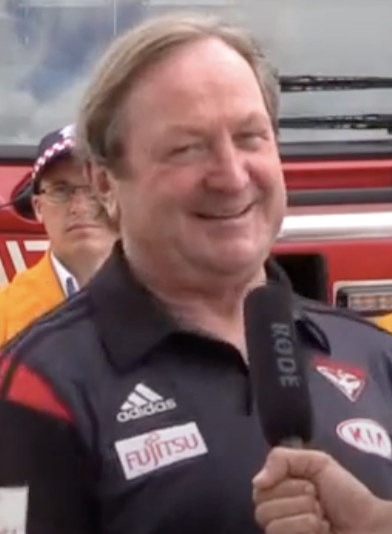
Sheedy with Essendon in 2016

Sheedy replaced Barry Davis as Essendon Football Club senior coach, starting from the 1981 season after Davis resigned at the end of the 1980 season.

Sheedy's greatest impact on the game was during his 27-year career as senior coach of Essendon. He held down the role continuously between 1981 and 2007, during which time some other sides had had over a dozen different coaches. Essendon won four premierships during Sheedy's tenure as senior coach in 1984, 1985, 1993 and 2000 as well as finishing runner-up three more times in 1983, 1990 and 2001 and losing a further two Preliminary Finals by only 1 point in 1996 and 1999.

He has never been regarded as a passive coach, and he was well known for trying what commentators have often described as bizarre tactics. Sheedy has always believed in trying his players in as many different positions as possible as well as giving discarded players from other clubs a second chance. These moves have not always paid off, but sometimes they have been crucial. Sheedy made several moves in the last quarter of the 1984 grand final, when Essendon looked out of the game, and the side scored a come-from-behind victory. On the recruiting front, prior to the 2000 season, Sheedy lured ruckman John Barnes back to Essendon (a side that had traded him many years earlier) in the 1999 AFL draft after he was let go by Geelong. Barnes proved to be a valuable player in the premiership side that year.

In June 2004, during the 2004 season, Sheedy renewed his contract as Essendon Football Club senior coach for a further three years, due to the great on-field performance during Sheedy's tenure. In the 2004 season, where Essendon under Sheedy finished in eighth place on the ladder and therefore made the finals. When the Bombers under Sheedy defeated Melbourne in the first elimination final, before being eliminated by Geelong in the semi-final. This is what ended up being the last finals performance for the Bombers under Sheedy's tenure at the club.

In the 2005 season, Essendon under Sheedy missed the finals for the first time since 1997, where the club under Sheedy finished in thirteenth place on the ladder with eight wins and fourteen losses at the end of the 2005 season.

In Round 9 of the 2006 AFL season, Sheedy coached his 600th VFL/AFL game. However, the milestone was not one to be remembered fondly, as Essendon went down by 60 points to Port Adelaide (a fate that also befell Jock McHale, who lost his 600th game as coach of Collingwood). The loss marked a low point in Sheedy's career, when the Bombers on-field performance deteriorated under Sheedy in the 2006 season and then missing the finals in 2006 and finishing 15th (second-last) position on the ladder with three wins, one draw and eighteen losses. This was the club's lowest finish under Sheedy, and the club's lowest finish in over 70 years despite defeating defending premiers Sydney in the first round of the season.

Also during the 2006 season, Sheedy took a leave of absence for one game when he injured his shoulder in a collision with defender Dean Solomon at training. Assistant coach Gary O'Donnell then took over as caretaker interim senior coach in the absence of Sheedy, for one game in Round 16, 2006, where Essendon drew with long-time rivals Carlton to end its then-record 14-match losing streak dating back to round two.

During the 2006 season, it was revealed that Sheedy had considered luring a 19-year-old Lance Franklin to the club from Hawthorn as the Bombers looked to strengthen the team in the wake of its poor 2006 season.

Until Round 16, 2007, Sheedy had coached the club in 629 games, a record for Essendon, and the second most by any coach in the history of the game. Coupled with the 251 games as a player, it is the most combined games as a player and coach in the history of the AFL, as some of Jock McHale's games were as a captain-coach.

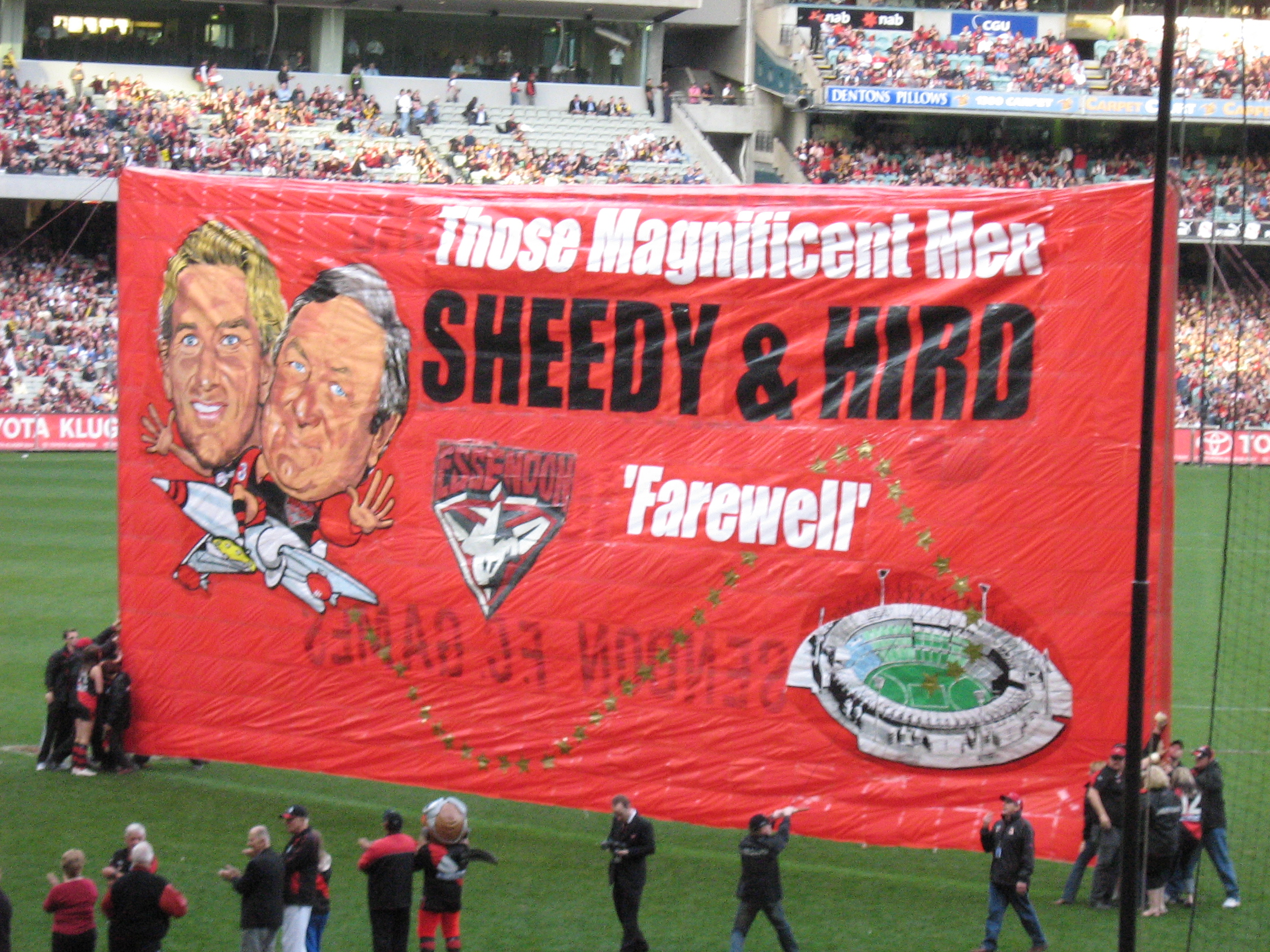
Kevin Sheedy and James Hird farewell banner ahead of their final game at the MCG

During the 2007 season, following the mid-year departures of other AFL senior coaches Neale Daniher, Chris Connolly and Denis Pagan, speculation mounted that Essendon would remove Sheedy in order to hire one of these experienced coaches or alternatively compete with the other coachless clubs for the leading candidates. On 25 July 2007, six weeks out from the finals, Essendon was on the brink of making the finals yet again when surprisingly it was announced that Sheedy's contract, due to expire at the end of the season, would not be renewed. Sheedy had however agreed to stay for the rest of the season to see it through rather than employ a so-called caretaker senior coach.

After the club sacked Sheedy, the Bombers under Sheedy lost four of the remaining six matches and collapsed as a finals contender to finish in twelfth place on the ladder with ten wins and twelve losses at the end of the 2007 season. Sheedy's last home game as Essendon Football Club senior coach was against his old playing side Richmond in Round 21, 2007 at the Melbourne Cricket Ground. Nearly 90,000 spectators turned out to farewell him and the retiring player James Hird. Although Essendon were defeated by a few goals, Sheedy received a standing ovation as he left the field for the last time. Sheedy had his ultimate farewell match against West Coast Eagles in Round 22, 2007 at the Subiaco Oval. Essendon trailed by a 44 points at three quarter time, and aided by 7 goals from Scott Lucas, attempted one of the greatest comebacks in AFL history, getting within 2 points with 5 minutes to go after Lucas missed a chance at his 8th goal of the quarter, but ultimately went down by 8 points. The massive comeback did effect West Coast's percentage, costing the Eagles a home qualifying final. Sheedy was replaced by Matthew Knights as Essendon Football Club senior coach.

Sheedy coached Essendon Football Club from 1981 until 2007, for a total of 27 seasons, with a record of 634 games with 386 wins 242 losses and 6 draws to a winning percentage at 60 percent. Sheedy also coached the club to a total of four premierships in 1984, 1985, 1993 and 2000 as well as when the club finished as runners-up in 1983, 1990 and 2001.

=== Greater Western Sydney ===
On 9 November 2009, Sheedy signed a three-year deal to be named as the inaugural senior coach of the Greater Western Sydney Giants, which joined the AFL in 2012. This was after there had been intense speculation he would return to Richmond as senior coach; however, this did not eventuate. Sheedy also missed out on the Melbourne coaching job at the end of 2007. His contract with GWS was subsequently extended for the 2013 season.

Greater Western Sydney lost both their games in the 2011 NAB Cup, including one to the Sydney Swans with a score of 4 points to 83; however, it should be kept in mind that the games in this tournament consisted of two 20-minute halves, and it was fairly common for teams to notch up very low scores (as a reference point, six teams scores a total of 15 points or less in the Round 1 games, including three teams scoring single-figure tallies). They fared better in the second game against the Gold Coast Suns, which they lost 27 points to 52.

Sheedy coached the Giants in their first season in the AFL in the 2012 season. Their inaugural AFL victory was on 12 May 2012 against the Gold Coast Suns. In Round 19 of the 2012 season, Sheedy coached in his 1000th game, a total including pre-season, night, international, and representative matches. The GWS Giants under Sheedy in their inaugural season, at the end of the 2012 season, finished in eighteenth position, which was the last position on the ladder for the wooden spoon with two wins and twenty losses.

In the 2013 season, The GWS Giants under Sheedy, finished in eighteenth position, which was the last position on the ladder for the wooden spoon for the second straight year in a row with only one win and twenty one losses.

On 1 September 2013, Sheedy coached his 679th and final game as a senior coach in the VFL/AFL, in Round 23, 2013, which was an 83-point loss against Gold Coast Suns at Carrara Stadium in the Gold Coast, Queensland. The two competing teams formed a guard of honour for Sheedy and a handover ceremony took place with Sheedy passing the baton to assistant coach Leon Cameron who succeeded him as senior coach, therefore at the end of the match, both teams had formed a guard of honour for Sheedy as he left the field for the final time. Cameron's contract, signed in October 2012, stipulated one year as assistant coach under senior coach Sheedy and then 3 years as the senior coach.

In his two seasons as the senior coach of the Giants, Sheedy coached 44 games. The team during his tenure had 3 wins and 41 losses, a winning percentage of 6.82%.

== Post-coaching career ==
After Sheedy left the Essendon Football Club when he was sacked as senior coach at the end of the 2007 season, Sheedy visited the United States and Canada in 2007 on a tour of North America as AFL ambassador, attending the USAFL National Championships, and was well received from stateside fans.

In October 2008, Sheedy was appointed in a marketing role at the Richmond Football Club. In this role, Sheedy focused solely on marketing and promotions.

Sheedy was appointed to the board of directors at the GWS Giants in December 2013.

In 2015, Sheedy left and departed from his position as board member of the GWS Giants, to return to the Essendon Football Club in the role of General Manager, Commercial Development and Innovation. In this role, Sheedy worked closely with commercial, community and marketing departments, spending significant time engaging with key stakeholders, developing new growth strategies and supporting the successful execution of the broader club vision and strategy.

In September 2020, Sheedy was appointed to the board of directors at the Essendon Football Club. On August 15, 2024, it was announced that Sheedy would step down from the board at Essendon Football Club at the end of the 2024 AFL season.

== Legacy ==
Sheedy's legacy is credited by "some commentators who observed that his considerable achievements were due not so much to abundant natural talent but to determination and the thoughtful application of his abilities". Despite Sheedy's impressive record in Australian rules football as a player and coach, "his most profound influence may be the innovations he proposed and supported. He has left an indelible mark on the game". Sheedy's most enduring legacy will be the changes that he promoted and supported, where he was a proponent of the extended interchange bench from two players to four, which has eased the physical demands on players caused by the increasing speed of the game, and Sheedy's creation of the traditional annual Essendon–Collingwood Anzac Day match, which has continued on for 30 years and counting. Sheedy has also been a great promoter and supporter of indigenous players, developing initiatives to take the game to indigenous communities and to foster and develop promising players. He also promoted the creation of an annual Essendon–Richmond Dreamtime at the 'G match to recognise each club's achievements in supporting the integration of indigenous culture and players. He has watched with pride as these and other initiatives have brought about a steady expansion of the number of indigenous players, the rewards mutually enjoyed, and the role models they provide to up-and-coming indigenous players. According to the Sport Australia Hall of Fame, in which Sheedy was inducted in 2009, "For all the Premiership trophies he has held aloft as player and coach, it is this legacy that may give him greatest satisfaction."

== Statistics ==
=== Playing statistics ===
Legend
G	Goals	K	Kicks	D	Disposals	T	Tackles
B	Behinds	H	Handballs	M	Marks

Season	Team	No.	Games	Totals							Averages (per game)						
Season	Team	No.	Games	G	B	K	H	D	M	T	G	B	K	H	D	M	T
1967	Richmond	10	6	2	1	83	21	104	20	—N/a	0.3	0.2	13.8	3.5	17.3	3.3	—N/a
1968	Richmond	10	16	1	6	217	60	277	51	—N/a	0.1	0.4	13.6	3.8	17.3	3.2	—N/a
1969	Richmond	10	23	1	0	381	51	432	101	—N/a	0.0	0.0	16.6	2.2	18.8	4.4	—N/a
1970	Richmond	10	19	2	2	269	63	332	89	—N/a	0.1	0.1	14.2	3.3	17.5	4.7	—N/a
1971	Richmond	10	23	2	1	263	51	314	73	—N/a	0.1	0.0	11.4	2.2	13.7	3.2	—N/a
1972	Richmond	10	23	5	3	306	65	371	88	—N/a	0.2	0.1	13.3	2.8	16.1	3.8	—N/a
1973	Richmond	10	25	20	24	372	117	489	91	—N/a	0.8	1.0	14.9	4.7	19.6	3.6	—N/a
1974	Richmond	10	23	34	33	381	176	557	81	—N/a	1.5	1.4	16.6	7.7	24.2	3.5	—N/a
1975	Richmond	10	23	9	11	251	120	371	54	—N/a	0.5	0.6	11.4	5.5	16.9	2.5	—N/a
1976	Richmond	10	22	2	0	254	119	373	74	—N/a	0.1	0.0	11.5	5.4	17.0	3.4	—N/a
1977	Richmond	10	24	10	5	321	181	502	86	—N/a	0.4	0.2	13.4	7.5	20.9	3.6	—N/a
1978	Richmond	10	20	3	0	212	129	341	44	—N/a	0.2	0.0	10.6	6.5	17.1	2.2	—N/a
1979	Richmond	10	4	0	1	33	18	51	5	—N/a	0.0	0.3	8.3	4.5	12.8	1.3	—N/a
Career			251	91	87	3343	1171	4514	857	—N/a	0.4	0.3	13.4	4.7	18.1	3.4	—N/a

=== Coaching statistics ===
Legend
W	Wins	L	Losses	D	Draws	W%	Winning percentage	LP	Ladder position	LT	League teams

Season	Team	Games	W	L	D	W %	LP	LT
1981	Essendon	23	16	7	0	69.6%	4	12
1982	Essendon	23	16	7	0	69.6%	4	12
1983	Essendon	26	18	8	0	69.2%	4	12
1984	Essendon	25	20	5	0	80.0%	1	12
1985	Essendon	24	21	3	0	87.5%	1	12
1986	Essendon	23	12	11	0	52.2%	5	12
1987	Essendon	22	9	12	1	43.2%	9	14
1988	Essendon	22	12	10	0	54.5%	6	14
1989	Essendon	25	18	7	0	72.0%	2	14
1990	Essendon	25	18	7	0	72.0%	1	14
1991	Essendon	23	13	10	0	56.5%	6	15
1992	Essendon	22	12	10	0	54.5%	8	15
1993	Essendon	24	16	7	1	68.8%	1	15
1994	Essendon	22	11	11	0	50.0%	10	15
1995	Essendon	24	15	7	2	66.7%	4	16
1996	Essendon	25	15	9	1	62.0%	6	16
1997	Essendon	22	9	13	0	40.9%	14	16
1998	Essendon	23	12	11	0	52.2%	8	16
1999	Essendon	24	19	5	0	79.2%	1	16
2000	Essendon	25	24	1	0	96.0%	1	16
2001	Essendon	25	19	6	0	76.0%	1	16
2002	Essendon	24	13	10	1	55.3%	5	16
2003	Essendon	24	14	10	0	58.3%	8	16
2004	Essendon	24	13	11	0	54.2%	8	16
2005	Essendon	22	8	14	0	36.4%	13	16
2006	Essendon	21	3	18	0	14.3%	15	16
2007	Essendon	22	10	12	0	45.5%	12	16
2012	Greater Western Sydney	22	2	20	0	9.1%	18	18
2013	Greater Western Sydney	22	1	21	0	4.5%	18	18
Career totals		678	389	283	6	57.8%		

== Public persona ==
Aside from his venerable coaching and playing record, Sheedy is also noted for his quirky antics, outspoken nature, and wry sense of humour. For example, before a game against West Coast Eagles at Essendon's former home ground of Windy Hill in 1991—the first time hosting the Eagles at the venue—he tied the windsock down on the School End outer terrace so the opposition would not know which way the wind was blowing. The tactic worked, and the Eagles won the toss and kicked into the breeze for the first quarter, although the Bombers inevitably lost by 7 points nonetheless. In 2021, 30 years after the incident, Sheedy said, in jest, that he tied the windsock down because the brand sponsor on the windsock had neglected to pay their account. The incident kick-started a fierce rivalry that would span decades. He is also fond of talking about how Martians cost his side the game in post-match press conferences, an oblique reference to the umpires, as AFL rules forbid coaches from criticising umpiring decisions. Such stories perpetuate the eccentric Sheedy myth and enigma of a man who would try anything for success.

Furthering the Sheedy legend on an episode of the TV show The Front Bar, Sheedy was shown archival news footage of his spies discreetly surveying the opposition's training sessions. While such tactics were common practice among all clubs at the time, Sheedy took it one step further by employing an amateur footballer to visit a private Hawthorn training session to gather intel by posing as a Hawthorn player. The spy managed to last 15 minutes "before being given his marching orders".

Another of his most memorable stunts came in 1993, again against the Eagles. In his excitement at winning a close match, with ruckman and forward Paul Salmon kicking a goal 30 seconds before the final siren against the West Coast Eagles, he waved his jacket in the air as he came rushing from the coaches' box. To this day, the supporters of the winning club wave their jackets in the air after the game when the two teams play. The moment is captured in Jamie Cooper's painting the Game That Made Australia, commissioned by the AFL in 2008 to celebrate the 150th anniversary of the sport, with Sheedy shown waving a red, black and yellow jacket rather than a red and black jacket, to reflect Sheedy's support of indigenous footballers.

Another example of his ability to build up and promote matches was in 1998 when he labelled North Melbourne executives Greg Miller and Mark Dawson "marshmallows", referring to how soft they were. This caused a tension between the two camps, and it came back to bite Sheedy when North Melbourne defeated Essendon in a finals match that season. After the match, Kangaroos supporters were provided with marshmallows, which they threw at Sheedy. Unfazed by this, Sheedy then promoted the rematch in 1999 as the "marshmallow" game.

Despite Sheedy's typically measured disposition, Sheedy did lose his cool on one occasion in 2000. In yet another game against the Eagles, Sheedy was fined $7,500 by the tribunal after making a cut-throat gesture to then-Eagle Mitchell White during the half-time break of the Essendon–West Coast clash in Round 15, 2000, also apparently mouthing the words "You... are... fucked!" to White.

Sheedy has long been an ambassador for the game throughout Australia, taking it upon himself to promote both the game in general and the Essendon club in particular. He has also done a great deal of work with Aboriginal communities in the northern parts of Australia, encouraging young Aboriginal people to take up the game, and being a vocal supporter of anti-racial vilification laws in the game. He has also encouraged foreign players to train with his side such as a former American footballer, a skillfully athletic Ethiopian immigrant, and more recently two Japanese try-outs.

In the build-up to the 2005 International Rules Series, as coach of the Australian side, Sheedy promoted the game by lightheartedly mentioning that supporters could attend the International rules game and be in for a high-scoring clash, or watch the Melbourne Victory game, which was on at the same time, and see a scoreline of "0–0, or 1–0, or 1–1".

Sheedy visited the United States and Canada in 2007 on a tour of North America as AFL ambassador, attending the USAFL National Championships, and was well received from stateside fans.

== Honours and appointments ==
In 1998, Sheedy was made a Member of the Order of Australia. In 2019, he was advanced to an Officer of the Order of Australia.

He received an Australian Sports Medal in 2000 and a Centenary Medal in 2001.

In 2003, Sheedy was awarded the Anniversary of National Service 1951–1972 Medal for his service as a National Serviceman in the Australian Army between 1969 and 1972.

He was inducted into the Sport Australia Hall of Fame in 2009.

Kevin is also a current Australian Apprenticeships Ambassador for the Australian Government.

Sheedy was awarded an honorary doctorate from Australian Catholic University.

== Cricket ==
Sheedy played five first eleven matches of Victorian Premier Cricket with the Richmond Cricket Club in 1977/78.

== Bibliography ==
- Sheedy, Kevin (2008). Stand Your Ground: Life and Football. Sydney: Pan Macmillan Australia. ISBN 978-1-4050-3930-7.
