= 1993 AFL season =

97th season of the Australian Football League (AFL)

1993 AFL premiership season
- Teams: 15
- Premiers: Essendon; 15th premiership
- Minor premiers: Essendon; 14th minor premiership
- Pre-season cup: Essendon; 2nd pre-season cup win
- Brownlow Medallist: Gavin Wanganeen (Essendon)
- Leading goalkicker: Gary Ablett (Geelong)

Attendance
- Matches played: 157
- Total attendance: 4,657,489 (29,666 per match)
- Highest: 96,862 (Grand Final, Essendon vs. Carlton)

The 1993 AFL season was the 97th season of the Australian Football League (AFL), the highest level senior Australian rules football competition in Australia, which was known as the Victorian Football League until 1989. The season featured fifteen clubs, ran from 26 March until 25 September, and comprised a 20-game home-and-away season followed by a finals series featuring the top six clubs.

The premiership was won by the Essendon Football Club for the 15th time, after it defeated Carlton by 44 points in the 1993 AFL Grand Final.

== Foster's Cup ==
The 1993 Foster's Cup saw Essendon 14.18 (102) defeat Richmond 11.13 (79) in the Grand Final.

== Home-and-away season ==
=== Round 1 ===
Home team	Home team score	Away team	Away team score	Ground	Crowd	Date
Footscray	13.17 (95)	Collingwood	17.13 (115)	MCG	58,997	Friday 26, March
North Melbourne	24.22 (166)	Brisbane Bears	22.11 (143)	MCG	8,653	Saturday 27, March
Hawthorn	13.15 (93)	Melbourne	11.4 (70)	Waverley Park	25,098	Saturday 27, March
Carlton	17.10 (112)	Fitzroy	17.16 (118)	Princes Park	23,433	Saturday 27, March
Geelong	20.16 (136)	St Kilda	16.16 (112)	Kardinia Park	24,337	Saturday 27, March
West Coast	17.21 (123)	Essendon	17.8 (110)	Subiaco Oval	34,361	Sunday 28, March
Richmond	12.12 (84)	Adelaide	28.10 (178)	MCG	18,473	Sunday 28, March

=== Round 2 ===
Home team	Home team score	Away team	Away team score	Ground	Crowd	Date
Richmond	18.18 (126)	Brisbane Bears	11.14 (80)	MCG	14,497	Friday 2, April
St Kilda	19.18 (132)	North Melbourne	19.11 (125)	Waverley Park	23,554	Saturday 3, April
Essendon	20.12 (132)	Carlton	19.18 (132)	MCG	49,856	Saturday 3, April
Melbourne	13.17 (95)	Footscray	15.13 (103)	Princes Park	13,076	Saturday 3, April
Collingwood	17.11 (113)	Geelong	15.13 (103)	Victoria Park	24,147	Saturday 3, April
Sydney	12.20 (92)	Hawthorn	22.17 (149)	SCG	10,144	Sunday 4, April
Adelaide	15.11 (101)	West Coast	12.14 (86)	Football Park	46,258	Sunday 4, April

- Carlton and Essendon played out the highest scoring draw in VFL/AFL history.

=== Round 3 ===
Home team	Home team score	Away team	Away team score	Ground	Crowd	Date
St Kilda	20.12 (132)	Sydney	13.16 (94)	Waverley Park	25,351	Saturday 10, April
Fitzroy	14.14 (98)	Footscray	14.17 (101)	Princes Park	18,265	Saturday 10, April
Brisbane Bears	17.13 (115)	Melbourne	17.11 (113)	Gabba	12,821	Sunday 11, April
West Coast	15.19 (109)	Richmond	9.11 (65)	Subiaco Oval	31,110	Sunday 11, April
Carlton	16.16 (112)	Hawthorn	16.14 (110)	Princes Park	33,274	Monday 12, April
Geelong	13.6 (84)	North Melbourne	15.18 (108)	Kardinia Park	23,428	Monday 12, April
Essendon	16.13 (109)	Collingwood	21.13 (139)	MCG	87,638	Monday 12, April

=== Round 4 ===
Home team	Home team score	Away team	Away team score	Ground	Crowd	Date
Adelaide	15.13 (103)	Fitzroy	15.12 (102)	Football Park	45,671	Friday 16, April
North Melbourne	19.14 (128)	Melbourne	14.15 (99)	MCG	24,362	Saturday 17, April
Hawthorn	11.13 (79)	Geelong	18.17 (125)	Waverley Park	31,492	Saturday 17, April
Collingwood	15.14 (104)	St Kilda	18.18 (126)	Victoria Park	28,350	Saturday 17, April
Sydney	14.11 (95)	Essendon	28.13 (181)	SCG	9,023	Sunday 18, April
West Coast	14.14 (98)	Brisbane Bears	6.10 (46)	Subiaco Oval	30,032	Sunday 18, April

=== Round 5 ===
Home team	Home team score	Away team	Away team score	Ground	Crowd	Date
Richmond	17.20 (122)	North Melbourne	25.9 (159)	MCG	35,113	Friday 23, April
Fitzroy	24.23 (167)	Sydney	11.8 (74)	Princes Park	10,257	Saturday 24, April
Footscray	20.7 (127)	Essendon	11.15 (81)	Whitten Oval	26,923	Saturday 24, April
St Kilda	11.12 (78)	Carlton	17.21 (123)	Waverley Park	51,211	Sunday 25, April
Brisbane Bears	19.12 (126)	Geelong	18.19 (127)	Gabba	12,996	Sunday 25, April
Melbourne	10.17 (77)	Adelaide	9.14 (68)	MCG	17,011	Sunday 25, April

=== Round 6 ===
	Round 6
Friday, 30 April (7:38 pm)	Melbourne 22.21 (153)	def.	Richmond 8.12 (60)	MCG (crowd: 33933)	Report
Friday, 30 April (8:38 pm)	Adelaide 12.16 (88)	def. by	Hawthorn 16.9 (105)	Football Park (crowd: 46689)	Report
Saturday, 1 May (2:08 pm)	Essendon 23.18 (156)	def.	Geelong 19.18 (132)	MCG (crowd: 46588)	Report
Saturday, 1 May (2:08 pm)	North Melbourne 35.19 (229)	def.	Sydney 16.9 (105)	Princes Park (crowd: 9230)	Report
Sunday, 2 May (1:15 pm)	Brisbane Bears 17.8 (110)	def.	Fitzroy 12.11 (83)	The Gabba (crowd: 9893)	Report
Sunday, 2 May (2:08 pm)	Carlton 15.11 (101)	def. by	Collingwood 21.11 (137)	MCG (crowd: 86196)	Report
Sunday, 2 May (4:08 pm)	West Coast 19.11 (125)	def.	Footscray 13.6 (84)	Subiaco Oval (crowd: 32579)	Report
	Bye; St Kilda
In one of the games of the year, Essendon prevailed over Geelong in a very entertaining shoot-out. Gary Ablett put on one of his finest individual displays, kicking 14 goals 7 behinds. At the other end, Paul Salmon kicked 10 goals.

=== Round 7 ===
Home team	Home team score	Away team	Away team score	Ground	Crowd	Date
Richmond	19.22 (136)	St Kilda	16.8 (104)	MCG	29,296	Saturday 8, May
Hawthorn	16.17 (113)	Brisbane Bears	10.10 (70)	Waverley Park	14,375	Saturday 8, May
Fitzroy	12.7 (79)	Melbourne	11.12 (78)	Princes Park	13,498	Saturday 8, May
Footscray	17.8 (110)	North Melbourne	22.9 (141)	Whitten Oval	20,942	Saturday 8, May
Collingwood	14.17 (101)	Adelaide	11.10 (76)	Victoria Park	25,854	Saturday 8, May
Sydney	13.17 (95)	Carlton	21.13 (139)	SCG	9,214	Sunday 9, May
Geelong	15.15 (105)	West Coast	16.17 (113)	Kardinia Park	23,697	Sunday 9, May

=== Round 8 ===
	Round 8
Friday, 14 May (8:38 pm)	West Coast 7.16 (58)	def. by	Fitzroy 11.10 (76)	WACA (crowd: 28506)	Report
Saturday, 15 May (2:00 pm)	St Kilda 9.13 (67)	def. by	Essendon 19.11 (125)	Waverley Park (crowd: 43886 )	Report
Saturday, 15 May (2:00 pm)	Carlton 11.12 (78)	def. by	Footscray 15.16 (106)	Princes Park (crowd: 24133)	Report
Saturday, 15 May (2:08 pm)	Collingwood 14.10 (94)	def.	Hawthorn 10.16 (76)	Victoria Park (crowd: 29880)	Report
Sunday, 16 May (2:00 pm)	Geelong 19.14 (128)	def.	Richmond 9.24 (78)	Kardinia Park (crowd: 25224)	Report
Sunday, 16 May (2:15 pm)	Brisbane Bears 33.21 (219)	def.	Sydney 8.9 (57)	The Gabba (crowd: 8916)	Report
Sunday, 16 May (5:38 pm)	Adelaide 19.9 (123)	def.	North Melbourne 18.13 (121)	Football Park (crowd: 45562)	Report
	Bye; Melbourne
Against a hapless Sydney team, the Brisbane Bears kicked their highest score in a game - 33.21 (219) - and recorded their biggest win (162 points). Their three-quarter time score of 27.17 (179) also set a League record as the highest three-quarter time score until it was surpassed in 2007.; At Football Park, Adelaide came back from 26 points down at three-quarter time against North Melbourne to win by 2 points. Crows full-forward Tony Modra kicked 10 goals, and took the Mark of the Year early in the third quarter, using North's Ian Fairley and teammate Mark Mickan as a stepladder to pull down a strong overhead mark near the goalsquare.

=== Round 9 ===
Home team	Home team score	Away team	Away team score	Ground	Crowd	Date
North Melbourne	20.14 (134)	Carlton	14.12 (96)	MCG	44,833	Friday 21, May
Hawthorn	20.11 (131)	Richmond	19.7 (121)	Waverley Park	20,316	Saturday 22, May
Fitzroy	14.8 (92)	Collingwood	10.13 (73)	Princes Park	24,442	Saturday 22, May
Footscray	22.11 (143)	St Kilda	11.13 (79)	Whitten Oval	17,458	Saturday 22, May
Essendon	16.15 (111)	Adelaide	10.5 (65)	MCG	34,372	Saturday 22, May
Sydney	15.14 (104)	Geelong	19.15 (129)	SCG	9,594	Sunday 23, May
Melbourne	14.17 (101)	West Coast	13.10 (88)	MCG	22,032	Sunday 23, May

=== Round 10 ===
Home team	Home team score	Away team	Away team score	Ground	Crowd	Date
Essendon	19.15 (129)	Fitzroy	19.11 (125)	MCG	50,567	Friday 28, May
Richmond	17.20 (122)	Sydney	14.9 (93)	MCG	17,781	Saturday 29, May
Carlton	17.26 (128)	Melbourne	11.8 (74)	Princes Park	23,702	Saturday 29, May
Footscray	9.8 (62)	Hawthorn	20.12 (132)	Whitten Oval	19,397	Saturday 29, May
St Kilda	9.10 (64)	West Coast	9.12 (66)	Waverley Park	19,918	Saturday 29, May
Collingwood	5.13 (43)	North Melbourne	19.12 (126)	Victoria Park	29,779	Saturday 29, May
Brisbane Bears	12.13 (85)	Adelaide	18.14 (122)	Gabba	12,395	Sunday 30, May

=== Round 11 ===
Home team	Home team score	Away team	Away team score	Ground	Crowd	Date
Fitzroy	7.14 (56)	Richmond	12.10 (82)	Princes Park	11,366	Saturday 12, June
St Kilda	20.10 (130)	Brisbane Bears	11.9 (75)	Waverley Park	11,748	Saturday 12, June
Geelong	13.11 (89)	Carlton	17.16 (118)	MCG	37,119	Saturday 12, June
Sydney	10.3 (63)	West Coast	17.18 (120)	SCG	8,794	Sunday 13, June
Adelaide	15.17 (107)	Footscray	8.14 (62)	Football Park	44,979	Sunday 13, June
Melbourne	24.16 (160)	Collingwood	16.13 (109)	MCG	57,833	Monday 14, June
Hawthorn	12.14 (86)	Essendon	17.14 (116)	Waverley Park	47,295	Monday 14, June

=== Round 12 ===
Home team	Home team score	Away team	Away team score	Ground	Crowd	Date
West Coast	15.11 (101)	North Melbourne	16.11 (107)	WACA	30,183	Friday 18, June
Melbourne	15.15 (105)	Essendon	10.11 (71)	MCG	44,094	Saturday 19, June
Hawthorn	23.14 (152)	St Kilda	11.8 (74)	Waverley Park	28,975	Saturday 19, June
Footscray	13.16 (94)	Sydney	10.9 (69)	Whitten Oval	11,797	Saturday 19, June
Carlton	24.12 (156)	Adelaide	11.11 (77)	Princes Park	21,405	Saturday 19, June
Geelong	16.17 (113)	Fitzroy	15.16 (106)	Kardinia Park	19,308	Sunday 20, June
Brisbane Bears	14.13 (97)	Collingwood	20.18 (138)	Gabba	15,471	Sunday 20, June

=== Round 13 ===
Home team	Home team score	Away team	Away team score	Ground	Crowd	Date
North Melbourne	11.14 (80)	Hawthorn	12.11 (83)	MCG	47,705	Friday 25, June
Fitzroy	12.7 (79)	St Kilda	17.10 (112)	Waverley Park	15,181	Saturday 26, June
Essendon	21.15 (141)	Richmond	8.15 (63)	Princes Park	19,105	Saturday 26, June
Footscray	17.19 (121)	Brisbane Bears	14.9 (93)	Whitten Oval	15,397	Saturday 26, June
Collingwood	11.5 (71)	West Coast	14.10 (94)	Victoria Park	24,371	Saturday 26, June
Sydney	23.11 (149)	Melbourne	16.13 (109)	SCG	8,250	Sunday 27, June
Adelaide	16.19 (115)	Geelong	14.11 (95)	Football Park	46,496	Sunday 27, June

=== Round 14 ===
Home team	Home team score	Away team	Away team score	Ground	Crowd	Date
Sydney	12.10 (82)	Adelaide	18.18 (126)	SCG	13,057	Friday 2, July
Essendon	23.17 (155)	Brisbane Bears	4.15 (39)	MCG	20,453	Saturday 3, July
St Kilda	6.10 (46)	Melbourne	14.8 (92)	Waverley Park	23,398	Saturday 3, July
Fitzroy	18.11 (119)	North Melbourne	17.16 (118)	Princes Park	13,965	Saturday 3, July
Geelong	15.20 (110)	Footscray	8.6 (54)	Kardinia Park	19,293	Saturday 3, July
West Coast	13.13 (91)	Carlton	14.8 (92)	Subiaco Oval	39,789	Sunday 4, July
Richmond	17.15 (117)	Collingwood	22.15 (147)	MCG	49,980	Sunday 4, July

=== Round 15 ===
Home team	Home team score	Away team	Away team score	Ground	Crowd	Date
North Melbourne	19.15 (129)	Essendon	13.13 (91)	MCG	55,693	Friday 9, July
Hawthorn	15.20 (110)	Fitzroy	9.10 (64)	Waverley Park	21,744	Saturday 10, July
Carlton	19.17 (131)	Brisbane Bears	14.13 (97)	Princes Park	16,934	Saturday 10, July
Collingwood	25.19 (169)	Sydney	11.11 (77)	Victoria Park	20,394	Saturday 10, July
Melbourne	22.9 (141)	Geelong	20.7 (127)	MCG	40,819	Saturday 10, July
Adelaide	23.18 (156)	St Kilda	8.15 (63)	Football Park	46,667	Sunday 11, July
Richmond	8.14 (62)	Footscray	10.18 (78)	MCG	24,832	Sunday 11, July

=== Round 16 ===
	Round 16
Friday, 16 July (8:38 pm)	Adelaide 26.15 (171)	def.	Richmond 4.8 (32)	Football Park (crowd: 45109)	Report
Saturday, 17 July (2:00 pm)	Fitzroy 14.11 (95)	def. by	Carlton 27.19 (181)	Princes Park (crowd: 24987)	Report
Saturday, 17 July (2:00 pm)	Collingwood 21.19 (145)	def.	Footscray 11.15 (81)	Victoria Park (crowd: 26156)	Report
Saturday, 17 July (2:00 pm)	St Kilda 27.15 (177)	def.	Geelong 15.16 (106)	Waverley Park (crowd: 22059)	Report
Saturday, 17 July (2:08 pm)	Melbourne 12.18 (90)	def. by	Hawthorn 16.10 (106)	MCG (crowd: 44303)	Report
Sunday, 18 July (2:08 pm)	Brisbane Bears 15.14 (104)	def. by	North Melbourne 22.14 (146)	The Gabba (crowd: 9609)	Report
Sunday, 18 July (2:08 pm)	Essendon 12.17 (89)	def.	West Coast 13.9 (87)	MCG (crowd: 44507)	Report
	Bye; Sydney
Adelaide continued their recent run of good form against Richmond, notching up the biggest win in the club's history to date (139 points). In their previous two clashes, the Crows had won by 110 and 94 points respectively. Tony Modra also kicked his third haul of 10 or more goals in a game, ending up with 13 goals 4 behinds. He had also kicked 10 against the Tigers in Round 1.; After being held to only three behinds from four kicks for the afternoon, Essendon full-forward Paul Salmon was awarded a free kick and converted the set shot in the dying minutes to give Essendon a two-point win against the reigning premiers West Coast. The win put Essendon back in the Top Six, and coach Kevin Sheedy acknowledged the importance of the win by waving his jacket in helicopter fashion as he was coming down from the coaches box. This iconic gesture instigated a scarf-waving tradition in matches between the two clubs for several years.

=== Round 17 ===
Home team	Home team score	Away team	Away team score	Ground	Crowd	Date
North Melbourne	14.13 (97)	St Kilda	16.16 (112)	MCG	28,410	Friday 23, July
Geelong	13.9 (87)	Collingwood	11.13 (79)	Waverley Park	38,166	Saturday 24, July
Footscray	14.13 (97)	Melbourne	16.14 (110)	Whitten Oval	14,469	Saturday 24, July
Carlton	12.11 (83)	Essendon	15.14 (104)	MCG	67,035	Saturday 24, July
Brisbane Bears	18.10 (118)	Richmond	14.15 (99)	Gabba	8,797	Sunday 25, July
Hawthorn	24.15 (159)	Sydney	9.13 (67)	Waverley Park	13,397	Sunday 25, July
West Coast	15.17 (107)	Adelaide	10.10 (70)	Subiaco Oval	36,081	Sunday 25, July

=== Round 18 ===
Home team	Home team score	Away team	Away team score	Ground	Crowd	Date
Collingwood	7.13 (55)	Essendon	18.15 (123)	MCG	87,573	Friday 30, July
North Melbourne	10.12 (72)	Geelong	25.16 (166)	MCG	34,439	Saturday 31, July
Footscray	22.14 (146)	Fitzroy	13.6 (84)	Whitten Oval	13,029	Saturday 31, July
Richmond	11.15 (81)	West Coast	15.10 (100)	Princes Park	6,025	Saturday 31, July
Hawthorn	13.13 (91)	Carlton	17.20 (122)	Waverley Park	40,850	Saturday 31, July
Sydney	17.16 (118)	St Kilda	24.11 (155)	SCG	9,756	Sunday 1, August
Melbourne	20.18 (138)	Brisbane Bears	6.13 (49)	MCG	15,664	Sunday 1, August

=== Round 19 ===
Home team	Home team score	Away team	Away team score	Ground	Crowd	Date
Essendon	18.9 (117)	Sydney	13.18 (96)	MCG	22,813	Friday 6, August
Richmond	12.11 (83)	Carlton	16.10 (106)	MCG	30,874	Saturday 7, August
St Kilda	9.14 (68)	Collingwood	10.20 (80)	Waverley Park	40,327	Saturday 7, August
Fitzroy	15.9 (99)	Adelaide	13.16 (94)	Princes Park	8,545	Saturday 7, August
Geelong	22.18 (150)	Hawthorn	10.8 (68)	Kardinia Park	25,817	Saturday 7, August
Brisbane Bears	10.11 (71)	West Coast	19.17 (131)	Gabba	9,046	Sunday 8, August

=== Round 20 ===
Home team	Home team score	Away team	Away team score	Ground	Crowd	Date
Sydney	15.9 (99)	Fitzroy	17.12 (114)	SCG	8,214	Friday 13, August
Carlton	10.17 (77)	St Kilda	11.18 (84)	Princes Park	22,774	Saturday 14, August
Essendon	14.14 (98)	Footscray	12.13 (85)	MCG	40,229	Saturday 14, August
West Coast	10.7 (67)	Hawthorn	6.9 (45)	Subiaco Oval	41,988	Sunday 15, August
North Melbourne	19.14 (128)	Richmond	11.18 (84)	MCG	17,585	Sunday 15, August
Adelaide	13.27 (105)	Melbourne	6.10 (46)	Football Park	46,310	Sunday 15, August

=== Round 21 ===
Home team	Home team score	Away team	Away team score	Ground	Crowd	Date
Fitzroy	22.15 (147)	Brisbane Bears	5.13 (43)	Princes Park	6,214	Saturday 21, August
Geelong	19.12 (126)	Essendon	14.10 (94)	Kardinia Park	32,808	Saturday 21, August
Collingwood	8.15 (63)	Carlton	17.15 (117)	MCG	84,054	Saturday 21, August
Hawthorn	17.13 (115)	Adelaide	13.10 (88)	Waverley Park	26,540	Saturday 21, August
Footscray	14.10 (94)	West Coast	7.10 (52)	Whitten Oval	12,444	Saturday 21, August
Richmond	8.6 (54)	Melbourne	26.19 (175)	MCG	21,654	Sunday 22, August
Sydney	14.14 (98)	North Melbourne	25.10 (160)	SCG	8,180	Sunday 22, August

=== Round 22 ===
Home team	Home team score	Away team	Away team score	Ground	Crowd	Date
West Coast	14.12 (96)	Geelong	17.14 (116)	WACA	32,121	Friday 27, August
St Kilda	18.17 (125)	Richmond	12.10 (82)	Waverley Park	22,971	Saturday 28, August
Carlton	16.15 (111)	Sydney	16.14 (110)	Princes Park	21,900	Saturday 28, August
North Melbourne	18.15 (123)	Footscray	20.15 (135)	MCG	31,109	Saturday 28, August
Brisbane Bears	15.16 (106)	Hawthorn	24.19 (163)	Gabba	11,544	Sunday 29, August
Melbourne	11.9 (75)	Fitzroy	14.14 (98)	MCG	22,605	Sunday 29, August
Adelaide	19.21 (135)	Collingwood	17.9 (111)	Football Park	48,522	Sunday 29, August

== Ladder ==
(P)	Premiers
	Qualified for finals

#	Team	P	W	L	D	PF	PA	%	Pts
1	Essendon (P)	20	13	6	1	2333	1959	119.1	54
2	Carlton	20	13	6	1	2315	1968	117.6	54
3	North Melbourne	20	13	7	0	2597	2150	120.8	52
4	Hawthorn	20	13	7	0	2166	1858	116.6	52
5	Adelaide	20	12	8	0	2168	1840	117.8	48
6	West Coast	20	12	8	0	1912	1651	115.8	48
7	Geelong	20	12	8	0	2354	2109	111.6	48
8	Collingwood	20	11	9	0	2086	2060	101.3	44
9	Footscray	20	11	9	0	1978	1997	99.0	44
10	Melbourne	20	10	10	0	2101	1873	112.2	40
11	Fitzroy	20	10	10	0	2001	2011	99.5	40
12	St Kilda	20	10	10	0	2040	2166	94.2	40
13	Brisbane Bears	20	4	16	0	1886	2504	75.3	16
14	Richmond	20	4	16	0	1753	2480	70.7	16
15	Sydney	20	1	19	0	1837	2901	63.3	4

Rules for classification: 1. premiership points; 2. percentage; 3. points for
Average score: 105.1
Source: AFL Tables

== Finals series ==
=== Week one ===
	Elimination Finals
EF1: Saturday, 4 September (2:30 pm)	North Melbourne 11.3 (69)	def. by	West Coast 17.18 (120)	Waverley Park (crowd: 29147)	Report
EF2: Sunday, 5 September (2:30 pm)	Hawthorn 13.17 (95)	def. by	Adelaide 16.14 (110)	MCG (crowd: 55287)	Report

	Qualifying Final
Saturday, 4 September (7:45 pm)	Essendon 14.14 (98)	def. by	Carlton 15.10 (100)	MCG (crowd: 79739)	Report

=== Week two ===
	Semi-finals
SF1: Sunday, 12 September (2:30 pm)	Essendon 16.12 (108)	def.	West Coast 11.10 (76)	MCG (crowd: 75453)	Report
SF2: Saturday, 11 September (2:30 pm)	Carlton 13.8 (86)	def.	Adelaide 8.20 (68)	Waverley Park (crowd: 59233)	Report

=== Week three ===
	Preliminary Final
Saturday, 18 September (2:30 pm)	Essendon 17.9 (111)	def.	Adelaide 14.16 (100)	MCG (crowd: 76380)	Report

=== Week four ===
	Grand Final
Saturday, 25 September (2:30 pm)	Essendon 20.13 (133)	def.	Carlton 13.11 (89)	MCG (crowd: 96862)	Report
Essendon won its 15th League Premiership.; Kevin Sheedy won his third premiership as a League coach.

== Awards ==
- The Brownlow Medal was awarded to Gavin Wanganeen of Essendon.
- The AFLPA MVP was awarded to Gary Ablett of Geelong.
- The Coleman Medal was awarded to Gary Ablett of Geelong.
- The Norm Smith Medal was awarded to Michael Long of Essendon.
- The inaugural AFL Rising Star award was awarded to Nathan Buckley of Brisbane.
- The Wooden Spoon was "awarded" to Sydney.
- The Reserves Grand Final was won by Melbourne against North Melbourne
- The Section 1 State of Origin was won by South Australia against Victoria
- The Section 2 State of Origin was won by Queensland-Northern Territory against Tasmania

== Notable events ==
- Following the release of the Crawford Report, prepared by insolvency expert David Crawford, the clubs voted to make several significant changes to the administrative structure of the AFL during the 1993 season:
  - Firstly, the AFL Commission was expanded from six members to eight, and was given the power to make most administrative decisions relating to the league unilaterally (as opposed to ratification by a vote of club presidents).
  - Secondly, the AFL Board of Directors, after 96 years of operation, voted itself out of existence.
  - Thirdly, the clubs retained the right to veto any Commission decision by a two-thirds majority.
  - Fourthly, with several Victorian clubs, as well as Brisbane and Sydney, being concerned about their long-term viability at the time, a stipulation was also included that any decisions relating to the expulsion, merger or relocation of any club required ratification by a simple majority of all clubs, and the agreement of the club(s) in question.
- The Brisbane Bears, which despite its name had played its home games in Gold Coast at Carrara Stadium for the first six years of its existence, relocated to Brisbane in 1993. Its first home game at its new home ground, the Gabba, against Melbourne in Round 3 resulted in a win.
- At the conclusion of their Round 4 game against Collingwood, St Kilda's Nicky Winmar responded to racial vilification from the Collingwood cheer squad by declaring, "I'm black and proud of it!" while raising his jumper and pointing to his skin, an image which has since become famous. This was also St Kilda's first win at Victoria Park in two decades.
- Brisbane and North Melbourne both set club-record high scores in this season. North Melbourne's 35.19 (229) in Round 6 was then the fifth-highest score of all time, and Brisbane's 33.21 (219) in Round 8 was then the tenth-highest of all time. The opponent in both of these games was Sydney.
- In Round 18, a piglet with the word "PLUGA" and the number four painted on it was released onto the Sydney Cricket Ground during the match between Sydney and St Kilda; play was held up for two to three minutes as it managed to evade capture from trainers, security guards and players. The idea to release the pig had been devised by a small group of Sydney supporters and players the previous week, and was intended as a tactic to put dangerous St Kilda full-forward Tony "Plugger" Lockett off his game. As it happened, Lockett missed the game with injury, but was reportedly enraged when he saw the incident on television.

== Sources ==
- 1993 AFL season at AFL Tables
- 1993 AFL season at Australian Football
