= Italian community of Melbourne =

Ethnic group located in Melbourne

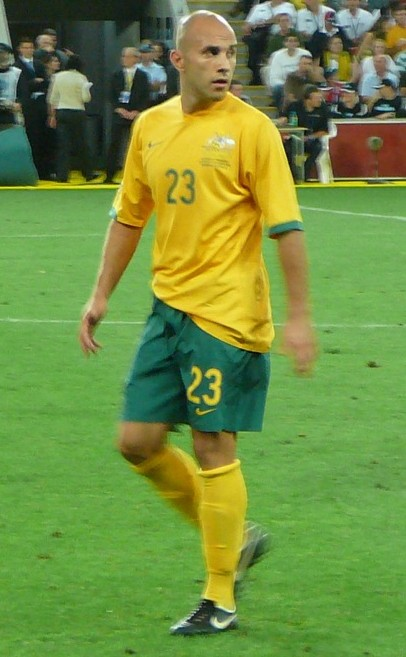

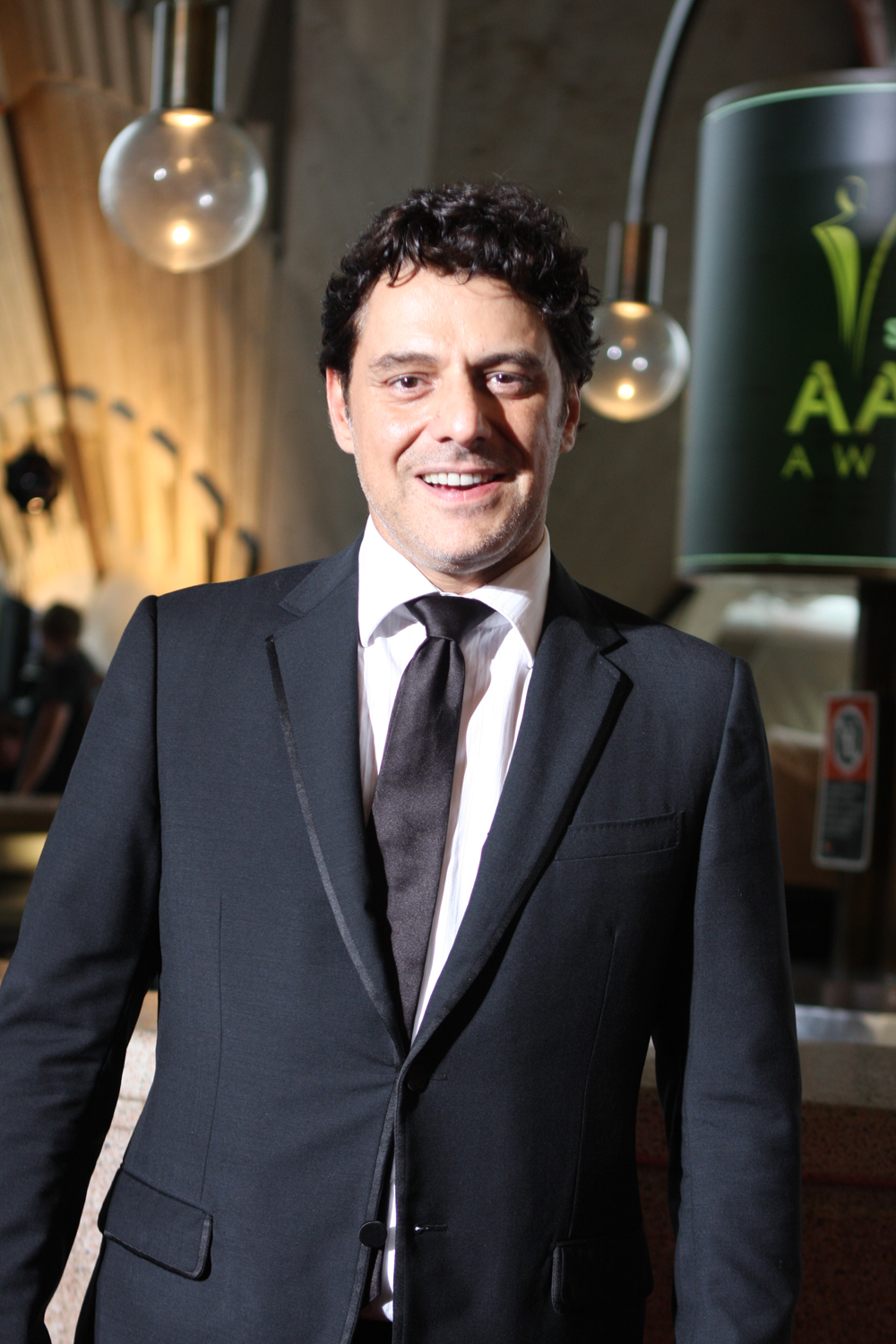

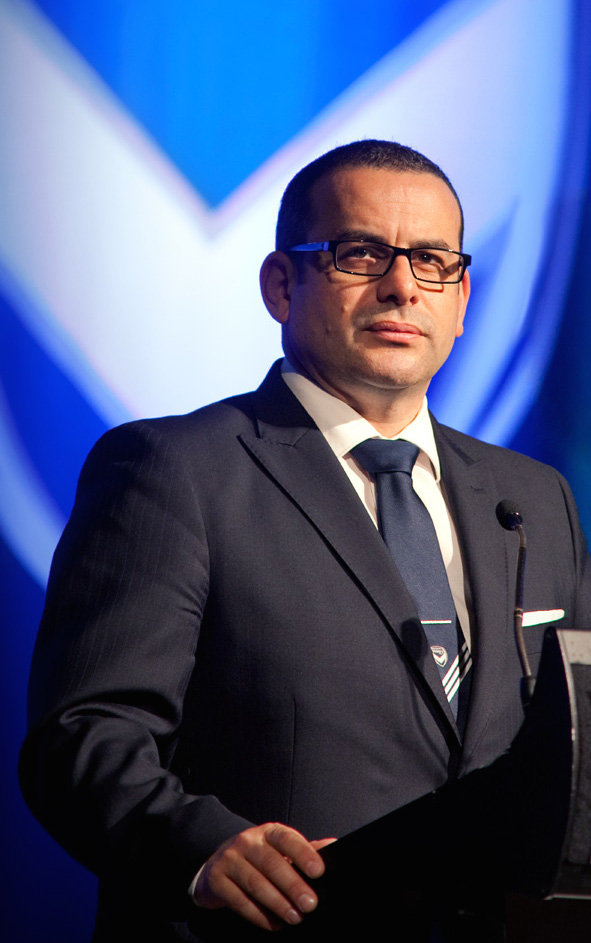

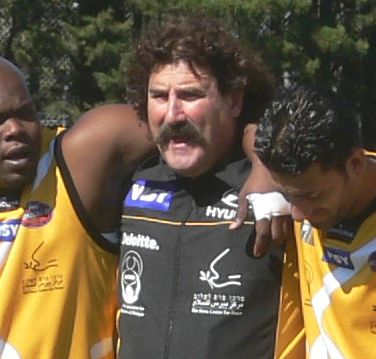

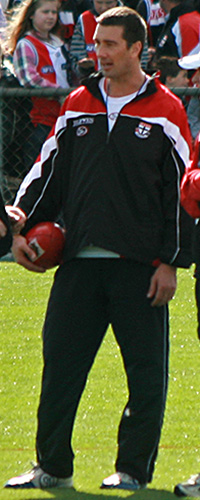

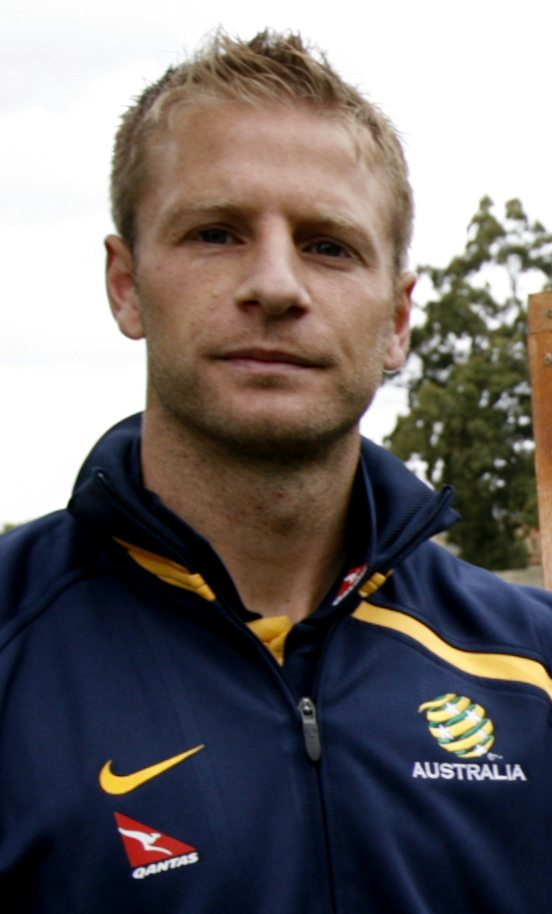

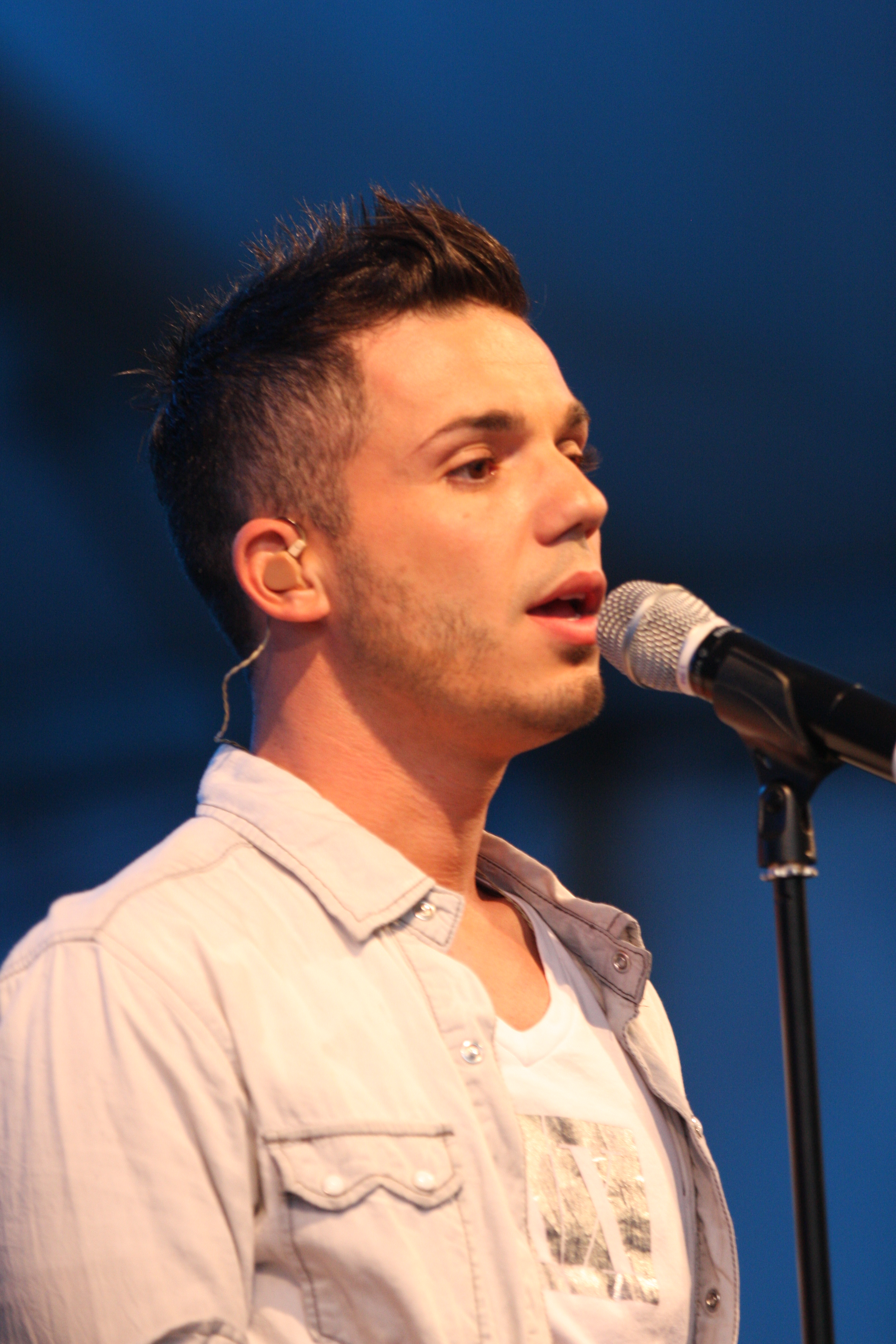

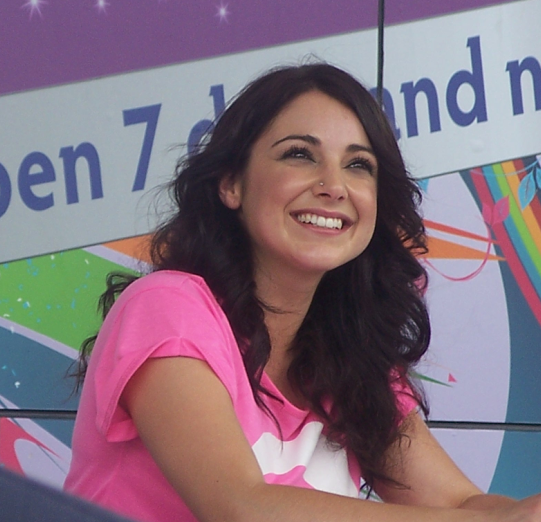
Marco Bresciano	Vince Colosimo	Anthony Di Pietro	Robert DiPierdomenico
Stephen Silvagni	Vince Grella	Anthony Callea	Natalie Gauci

Total population
- Italian; 68,823 (by birth, 2011); 279,112 (by ancestry, 2011)

Languages
- Australian English; Italian; Italo-Australian dialect; Sicilian language; Neapolitan dialect; Calabrian dialect; Venetian dialect; other Italian dialects; languages of Italian historical minorities

Religion
- Predominantly Roman Catholic

Related ethnic groups
- Italian American, part of Italian Australian, Italian Canadian, Italian Scottish, Italian Welsh, Mediterraneans

The Italian community of Melbourne is the second largest ethnic group in Greater Melbourne, Victoria, Australia, second to the Anglo-Celtic Australians ethnic group. The 2011 Census counted that of the 185,402 residents that were born in Italy who live in Australia, 68,823 lived in Melbourne, which was the highest percentage of the country at 37.1%. The same could be said for the total Australian population of Italian ancestry, with 279,112 of the 916,121 (30.4%) listed as Melbourne residents, which is the highest Italian population in Australia and the Oceanic continent per city.

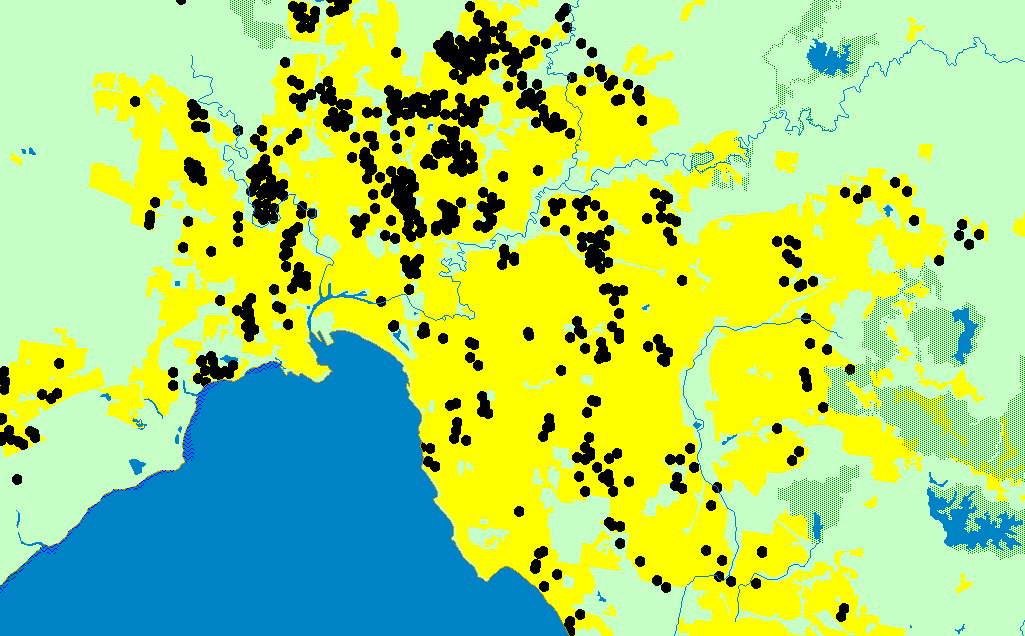
One dot signifies an approximate area of Melbourne where 100 residents were born in Italy

== History ==
=== Victorian gold rush era ===
Inaugural records of the Italian community of Melbourne are debated as official records are obscured. It is known that the Victorian gold rush of the 1850s attracted approximately 4,000 ethnic Italians to the colony. These immigrants primarily came from the Valtellina region in Lombardy or the southern Swiss cantons. The drain on the labour supply occasioned by the gold rush caused Australia to also seek workmen from Europe for land use and the development of cultivation. Once the gold rush ended in the late 1860s, most Italians returned home. The exact number of Italians who came to Victoria during this period is unknown as until 1871 Italians did not receive a special place in any Australian census figures.

=== Late 19th century - World War I ===
A group of musicians from the town of Viggiano in the Basilicata region formed a small community in Little Lonsdale Street in the 1890s and relocated to Carlton. Immigrants from the Aeolian Islands in Sicily began to settle in the inner-city suburbs, working in as fruiterers. By 1891, there were 1,700 Italians in Victoria (91% were male). In 1896, the Dante Alighieri Society branch in Melbourne was founded to promote Italian language and culture in the city.

=== Post World War II ===
The northern inner-suburbs saw the highest population densities of Italian migration between the 1940s-60's. These suburbs consisted of Brunswick, Brunswick East, Brunswick West, Carlton, Carlton North, Fitzroy, Fitzroy North, Parkville and Princes Hill. Of all the listed suburbs, the highest concentration in Carlton, saw the eventual establishment of Melbourne's current Little Italy, on Lygon Street, between the intersections of Elgin & Queensberry streets.

=== Post-2008 financial crisis migration ===
In the recent years, Australia has been witnessing a new wave of migration from Italy in numbers not seen in half a century, as thousands flee the economic hardship in Europe, with the 2008 financial crisis playing a large role, many Italians migrated from Italy to Australia in large numbers. The explosion of numbers saw more than 20,000 Italians arrive in Australia in 2012-13 on temporary visas, exceeding the number of Italians that arrived in 1950–51 during the previous migration boom following World War II.

=== Today ===
Today, the city of Melbourne is a sister city to Milan, Italy, with the city's population consisting of 68,823 residents by birth, and 279,112 residents by heritage, as of 2011. Recent restaurant expansion on Lygon street has seen many new Italian restaurants open in the Brunswick East side and also seen the re location of Mondo Music (50 Lygon Street Brunswick East) - the iconic retail store specialising in Italian DVD's, CD's and other Italian merchandise. The recently redeveloped Abruzzo club opened 377 on Lygon in late 2015, and the international award-winning 400 gradi restaurant, that was declared to have the 'world's best pizza' in 2014.

== Lygon Street - Melbourne's Little Italy ==
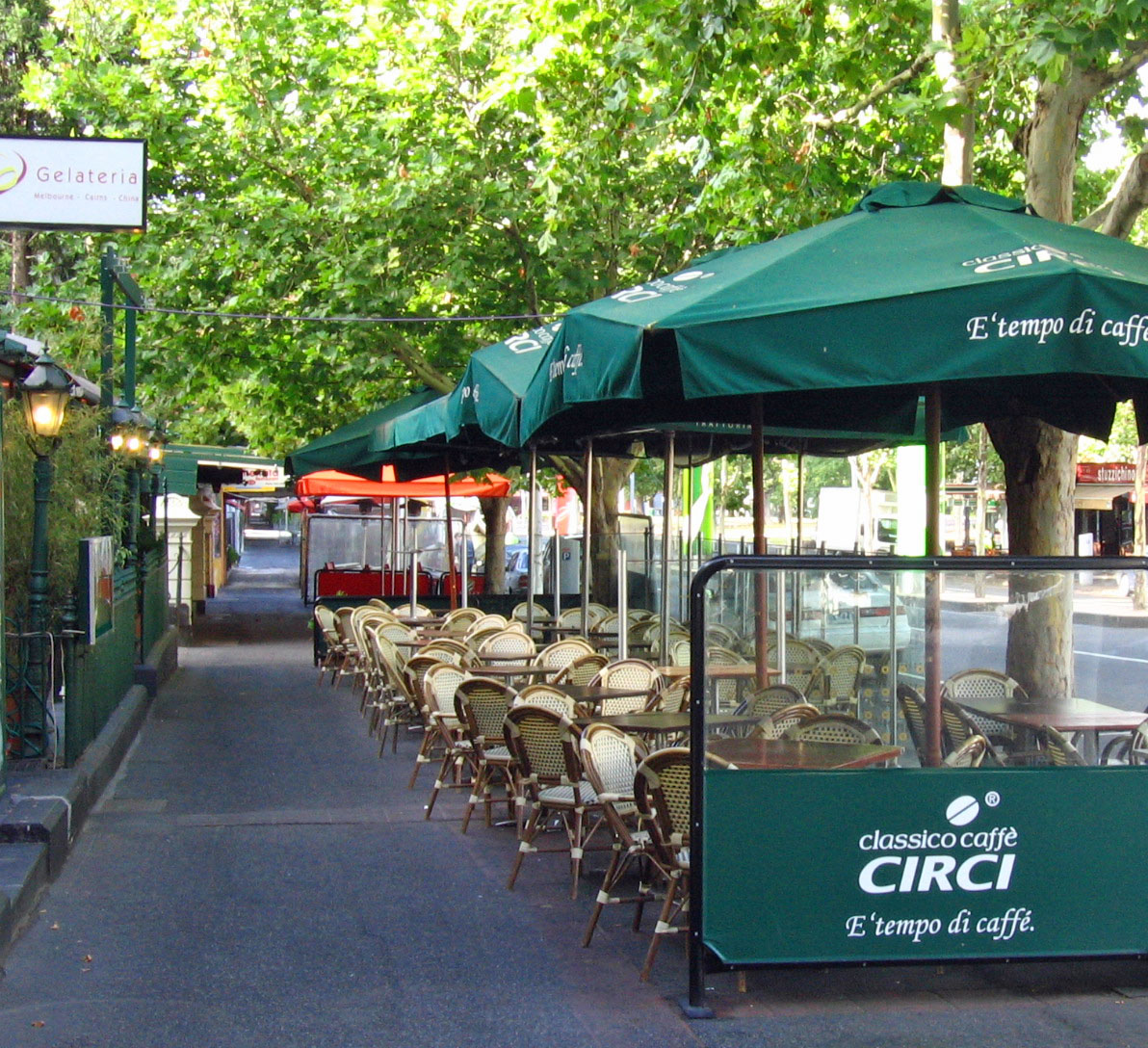
Alfresco dining along Lygon Street

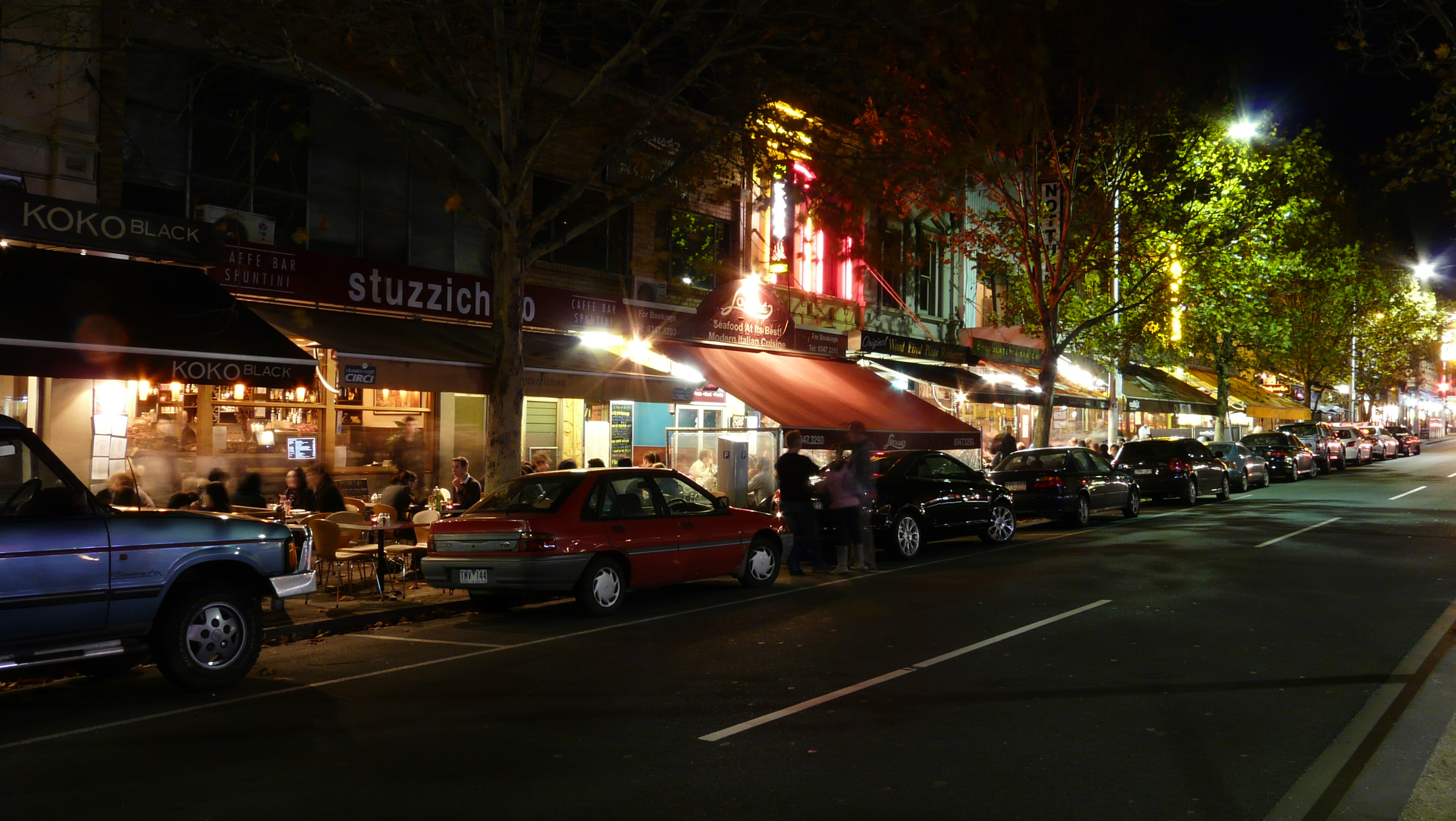
The street at night, the particular block of the street was the site of celebration when Italy defeated Germany 2-1 in the 2012 Euro Cup

The Italian restaurant district synonymous with Lygon Street district occupies a number of blocks between Queensberry Street in the South, along Lygon Street, to Elgin Street in the North. Restaurants can also be found along the streets intersecting Lygon Street, towards the Carlton Gardens in the east and the University of Melbourne in the west. The Lygon Street Festa is an annual celebration that is one of Australia's largest outdoor street festivals, celebrating the Italian culture and cuisine of Melbourne which is held in the district in November.

The La Mama Theatre and Courthouse Theatre are also in this area, as is the heritage-listed neon sign at Borsari's Corner, named after Italian cyclist Nino Borsari, on the corner of Grattan Street. Toto's Pizza House, the first pizzeria established in Australia, has been located at the southern end of Lygon Street continuously since its opening in 1961.

Towards the centre of the district, on the corner of Lygon Street and Argyle Place, there is a small Italian-inspired piazza named Piazza Italia, which is a joint-redevelopment by Melbourne and its sister city, Milan, in Italy.

The block between Cardigan street and Arglye Place South, are synonymous for the site of celebrations of Italian sport. During the annual Australian Grand Prix, the restaurant district, particularly the stated block, is bathed in red and yellow banners in support of the Ferrari Formula One racing team and, in 1982 and 2006, it was also a major site of Australian celebrations when Italy's national football team won the 1982 and 2006 FIFA World Cups. In 2012, the block, where Notturno Cafe is situated, was the most popular site during the 2012 Euro Cup. In the early hours of 28 June, Lygon street was brought to a stand still following Italy's 2-1 victory over Germany in the semi-finals, advancing to the final against eventual winners Spain, where supporters celebrated on the street for hours, blocking traffic in all directions.

== Sport ==
Melbourne's Italian community has played influential roles in many sports throughout Melbourne. Association Football (soccer) and Australian rules football have been the most popular sports the community has engaged in, at professional levels. There has been influence in the sports of bocce, tennis, and basketball in the community.

=== Association Football (Soccer) ===
Football (soccer) has been a fundamental characteristic of sport in Melbourne's Italian community. Many clubs in the past seventy years, competing competitively or defunct, have been in suburbs all over Melbourne, with two clubs participating in the former National Soccer League, being Brunswick Juventus Junior FC (formerly Brunswick Juventus) and Carlton SC. There are currently at least eighteen active clubs based in Melbourne who are competing in various divisions throughout Victoria.

==== National team players ====
Player	Years	Appearances	Goals
Andrew Zinni	1986-1991	17	3
Danny Tiatto	1995-2005	23	1
Marco Bresciano	2001-2015	84	13
Simon Colosimo	1998-2010	26	3
Patrick Kisnorbo	2002-2009	18	1
Paul Trimboli	1988-2002	46	16
Vince Grella	2003-2010	46	0

As of 8 June 2016

==== Clubs ====
In Melbourne, there are numerous social and sports clubs founded by and/or have a strong Italian following, or have official Italian recognitions.

Active clubs as of the 2022 Victorian football season

Club	Founded	Location	League (Senior Men's)
Avondale FC	1984	Parkville	NPL
Boroondara-Carey Eagles FC	2015	Bulleen	VSL 1 South-East
Brimbank Stallions FC	1986	Sunshine	VSL 1 North-West
Brunswick Juventus Junior FC	1964	Brunswick East	VSL 4 North
FC Bulleen Lions	1974	Bulleen	NPL 2 East
Carlton Azzuri SSC	1979	Carlton North	Melbourne Chinese Soccer Association League A
Epping City FC	1997	Epping	VSL 2 North-West
Essendon Royals SC	1959	Essendon	VSL 1 North-West
Fawkner SC	1965	Fawkner	VSL 3 North-West
Knox United SC	2003	Rowville	VSL 5 East
Mazenod FC	1997	Mulgrave	VSL 1 South-East
Manningham Juventus FC	1964	Doncaster	VSL 4 East
Manningham United Blues FC	2014	Doncaster	NPL 2 East
Moreland Zebras Juventus FC	1997	Fawkner	NPL 2 West
Northern Falcons FC	1986	Thornbury	VSL 4 North
Old Xaverians SC	2002	Kew East	VSL 4 East
Werribee City FC	1969	Werribee	NPL 2 West
Whittlesea Ranges FC	1971	Epping	NPL 2 West

=== Australian Rules Football ===
In June 2007 the Victorian Football League-Australian Football League announced a (VFL/AFL) Italian Team of the Century, in recognition of the role of Italian Australian players have had in the sport. The vast majority of the official players were born &/or raised in Melbourne. These players consist of:

Player	Position	Club(s)
Alan Martello	Half Forward	Hawthorn (1970-1980); Richmond (1981-1983)
Anthony Koutoufides	Half Back	Carlton (1992–2007)
Brendan Fevola	Full Forward	Carlton (1999–2009); Brisbane Lions (2010)
Frank Curcio	Full Back	Fitzroy (1932–1948)
John Kennedy Jr.	Half Back	Hawthorn (1979–1991)
Mark Mercuri	Half Forward	Essendon (1992–2004)
Len Incigneri	Full Back	South Melbourne (1903, 1905); Richmond (1907–1911); Melbourne (1913–1914)
Robert Di Pierdomenico	Center	Hawthorn (1975–1991)
Ron Barassi	as Coach	as a coach: Carlton (1965–1971); North Melbourne (1973–1980); Melbourne (1964, 1981–1985); Sydney (1993–1995)
Sav Rocca	Forward	Collingwood (1992–2000); North Melbourne (1958–1971)
Sergio Silvagni	as Interchange; Center	Carlton (1958–1971)
Stephen Silvagni	Full Back	Carlton (1985–2001)
Steven Alessio	Follower	Essendon (1992–2003)
Tony Liberatore	as Interchange; Center	Footscray/Western Bulldogs (1986–2002)

== Notable people ==
The following list contains notable Italian Australians who were born and/or raised in Melbourne. The list is structured in alphabetical order by surname, and the resident's listed occupation is what he/she was known for. (Incomplete List)

- Emma Alberici
- Vanessa Amorosi
- Tina Arena
- George Baldessin
- Pietro Baracchi
- Ron Barassi Sr.
- Ron Barassi Jr.
- Melissa Barbieri
- Enza Barilla
- Steve Bastoni
- Edo Benetti
- Peter Bevilacqua
- Cris Bonacci
- Marco Bresciano
- Anthony Callea
- Blake Caracella
- Frank Carbone
- Emmanuel Carella
- Andrew Carrazzo
- Vin Catoggio
- Orfeo Cecconato
- Chris Cester
- Santo Cilauro
- Gabriella Cilmi
- Chris Ciriello
- Simon Colosimo
- Vince Colosimo
- Paul Cosentino
- Frank Curcio
- Andrew Daddo
- Cameron Daddo
- Lochie Daddo
- Fausto De Amicis
- Ron De Iulio
- Brett Deledio
- Anthony Di Pietro
- Robert DiPierdomenico
- Frank Dimattina
- Paul Dimattina
- Virgil Donati
- Brendan Fevola
- Matthew Foschini
- Vince Grella
- Tony Liberatore
- Mark Lo Giudice
- Joe Misiti
- Dylan Murnane
- Tony Pignata
- Mark Philippoussis
- Louisa Angelina Santospirito
- Stephen Silvagni

== See also ==
- Italian diaspora
- Italo-Australian Dialect
- Greek community of Melbourne
