= Gerard Healy =

Australian rules footballer, born 1961

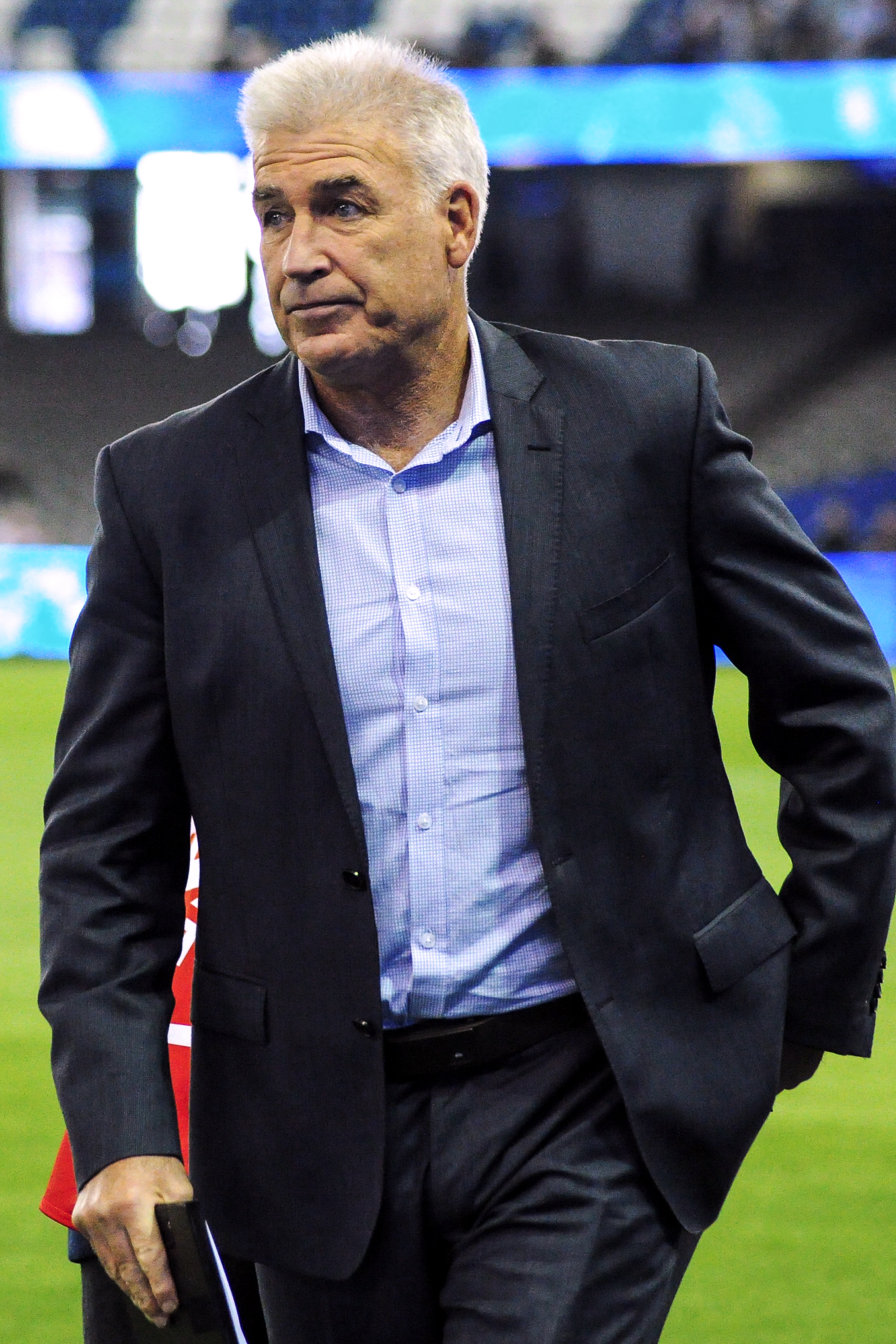
- Healy in April 2018

Personal information
- Born: 1 March 1961 (age 65)
- Original team: Edithvale-Aspendale
- Height: 184 cm (6 ft 0 in)
- Weight: 81 kg (179 lb)

Playing career^{1}
Years	Club	Games (Goals)
1979–1985	Melbourne	130 (189)
1986–1990	Sydney	81 (87)
1991	Collingwood	0 (0)
Total		211 (276)

Representative team honours
Years	Team	Games (Goals)
- Victoria
- ^{1} Playing statistics correct to the end of 1991.

Career highlights
- Club: Brownlow Medal: 1988; VFLPA MVP (Leigh Matthews Trophy): 1988; 3× All-Australian Team: 1986, 1987, 1988; 5× VFL Team of the Year; 3× Bob Skilton Medal: 1986, 1987, 1988; Keith 'Bluey' Truscott Medal: 1984; Melbourne leading goalkicker: 1982; Sydney Swans Team of the Century; Media Association Player of the Year: 1988; Representative: E. J. Whitten Medal: 1988

Gerard Healy (born 1 March 1961) is a former Australian rules footballer and commentator. Healy attended St Bede's College in Mentone, where he was the senior football captain. Gerard is a trained physiotherapist.

== VFL career ==
=== Melbourne Demons ===
Beginning his career with the Melbourne Football Club in 1979, Healy played mostly in a forward pocket role in attack before switching to an on-baller/midfielder role and establishing himself as one of the premier ball winners in the competition. He won Melbourne's best and fairest award in 1984.

=== Sydney Swans ===
He left the Demons in 1985, after playing 130 games, moving to the Sydney Swans at the beginning of the 1986 season. He immediately made an impact at the Swans, winning best and fairests in his first three years with the team – 1986, 1987, 1988. Season 1988 was to prove the finest of his career.

In addition to the Swans' Best & Fairest award, Healy took home the Brownlow Medal as the VFL's fairest and best player, the VFL Players Association MVP and the Simpson Medal for best on ground in the Victoria vs Western Australia state game played in Perth. He retired from Sydney in 1991 due to a serious wrist injury. He was later recognised as one of Sydney's greats, being named in their Team of the Century.

Following his forced retirement, Collingwood picked Healy in the 1991 AFL draft on the chance that his injury would recover but Healy never played another AFL match.

In 2000, Healy was inducted into the Australian Football Hall of Fame. On 18 July 2009, he was also inducted into the Sydney Swans Hall of Fame.

== Playing statistics ==
Legend
G	Goals	K	Kicks	D	Disposals	T	Tackles
B	Behinds	H	Handballs	M	Marks

Season	Team	No.	Games	Totals							Averages (per game)						
Season	Team	No.	Games	G	B	K	H	D	M	T	G	B	K	H	D	M	T
1979	Melbourne	39	21	10	19	244	71	315	55	—N/a	0.5	0.9	11.6	3.4	15.0	2.6	—N/a
1980	Melbourne	39	7	4	9	123	52	175	36	—N/a	0.6	1.3	17.6	7.4	25.0	5.1	—N/a
1981	Melbourne	39	22	27	14	295	157	452	92	—N/a	1.2	0.6	13.4	7.1	20.5	4.2	—N/a
1982	Melbourne	3	21	77	55	263	89	352	99	—N/a	3.7	2.6	12.5	4.2	16.8	4.7	—N/a
1983	Melbourne	3	19	37	41	198	72	270	98	—N/a	1.9	2.2	10.4	3.8	14.2	5.2	—N/a
1984	Melbourne	3	20	19	25	304	133	437	81	—N/a	1.0	1.3	15.2	6.7	21.9	4.1	—N/a
1985	Melbourne	3	20	15	18	301	125	426	84	—N/a	0.8	0.9	15.1	6.3	21.3	4.2	—N/a
1986	Sydney	3	22	26	21	344	212	556	82	—N/a	1.2	1.0	15.6	9.6	25.3	3.7	—N/a
1987	Sydney	3	20	22	18	302	185	487	65	37	1.1	0.9	15.1	9.3	24.4	3.3	1.9
1988	Sydney	3	20	26	34	351	218	569	89	25	1.3	1.7	17.6	10.9	28.5	4.5	1.3
1989	Sydney	3	8	6	4	150	64	214	22	9	0.8	0.5	18.8	8.0	26.8	2.8	1.1
1990	Sydney	3	11	7	12	212	100	312	37	12	0.6	1.1	19.3	9.1	28.4	3.4	1.1
Career			211	276	270	3087	1478	4565	840	83	1.3	1.3	14.6	7.0	21.6	4.0	1.4

== Honours and achievements ==
**Brownlow Medal votes**
Season	Votes
1979	—
1980	1
1981	—
1982	2
1983	1
1984	2
1985	8
1986	7
1987	9
**1988**	**20**
1989	2
1990	1
**Total**	**53**
Key:
Green / **Bold** = Won

== Broadcasting career ==
After retiring in 1990, Healy became an commentator with the Seven Network on their AFL coverage. Healy was a special comments in 5 AFL grand finals with Seven.

On radio, he has also been a long-time special comments man on 3AW for their AFL coverage, as well as hosting Sports Today since 1996. He gave a heartfelt farewell message on the show to his co-host David Hookes after his death in 2004. Hookes was later replaced on the show by Dwayne Russell.

His audio commentary also has been used for computer games, including as AFL 2007 along with Dennis Cometti.

Following Seven losing the AFL rights, Healy joined Nine Network as a special commentator for the 2002 & 2003 seasons, before moving to Fox Footy Channel from 2004 in the same role until its closure in 2006 as well as hosting On the Couch in which he did during his time on Nine. He continued his commentary role for AFL matches with Fox Sports from 2007 and since 2012 on second version of Fox Footy.

Healy is referred to as “G” by some of his colleagues, including fellow ex-AFL players Ben Dixon and Nick Dal Santo.

== Personal life ==
Gerard Healy is married to Lisa (née Gluyas) and together they have three daughters and a son.
