= Greg Williams (Australian footballer) =

Australian rules footballer, born 1963

Personal information
- Full name: Gregory Donald Williams
- Nickname: Diesel
- Born: 30 September 1963 (age 63); Victoria, Australia
- Original team: Golden Square
- Height: 176 cm (5 ft 9 in)
- Weight: 88 kg (194 lb)

Playing career^{1}
Years	Club	Games (Goals)
1984–1985	Geelong	34 (10)
1986–1991	Sydney	107 (118)
1992–1997	Carlton	109 (89)
Total		250 (217)

Representative team honours
Years	Team	Games (Goals)
	Victoria	9 (8)
- ^{1} Playing statistics correct to the end of 1997.

Career highlights
- Club: AFL Premiership: 1995; Norm Smith Medal: 1995; 2× Brownlow Medal: 1986, 1994; 2× AFLPA MVP: 1985, 1994; 2× All-Australian team: 1993, 1994 (c); Geelong Best & Fairest: 1985; Carlton Best & Fairest: 1994; Carlton Vice Captain: 1993; AFL Team of the Century – Interchange; Australian Football Hall of Fame; Carlton Team of the Century – Centre; Sydney Team of the Century – Centre; Carlton Hall of Fame; Sydney/South Melbourne Hall of Fame; Representative: E. J. Whitten Medal: 1987; Victoria Captain: 1989; 2× All-Australian team: 1986, 1987

Gregory Donald Williams (born 30 September 1963) is a former Australian rules footballer who represented Geelong, the Sydney Swans and Carlton in the Australian Football League (AFL) during the 1980s and 1990s. A midfielder, he is a dual Brownlow Medal winner and at his peak was the then-highest-paid player in the history of the sport, including an under-the-table $200,000 bonus payment. He was also linked to further controversy during the 1990s.

== Playing style ==
Williams made his name as one of the best centres in the history of the game. He was particularly skilful at handpassing, and was the most prolific user of the skill during his era. The hallmark of Williams' play was his ability to win ground contests, and almost immediately free the ball to nearby teammates via quick, accurate handpassing. To that end, Williams' other strengths included his vision and awareness of the teammates around him; he is said to have been heavily involved in midfield tactics at ball-ups. His kicking and ball winning skills were also strong.

Williams strengths outweighed several negative physical characteristics which could have hindered his career as a footballer. Most notably, he was a slow runner; he had been knock-kneed as a child and his pace was not helped by five knee surgeries throughout his career. He was also short, stocky and carried extra weight early in his career.

Williams earned the nickname "Diesel", after the nickname of John Riggins, an American NFL player whose motivational tapes were used by Williams' first Victorian Football League (VFL) Geelong captain Michael Turner, and remains widely used.

== Playing career ==
=== Before the VFL ===
The third of eight children, Williams spent his early life in Melbourne, before moving to Bendigo at the age of 10. There, he played football for the Golden Square Football Club in the Bendigo Football League, earning strong acclaim at junior levels, representing Victoria in the Teal Cup in 1980.

Prior to the 1982 VFL season, Williams trained in the pre-season with the Carlton Football Club (to which the Bendigo Football League was zoned), but the Blues ultimately rejected him, deterred by his lack of speed and fitness. He returned to Golden Square for the season, winning the Michelsen Medal as league best and fairest. Carlton invited him to try out again in the 1983 pre-season, but again he was rejected. He returned to Golden Square, and once again he won the Michelsen Medal.

=== Geelong ===
As Carlton had passed on Williams, other VFL clubs were able to recruit him, and prior to the 1984 VFL season he was recruited to Geelong, then under coach Tom Hafey. Williams made his debut in Round 1 and amassed 38 disposals, and scored three Brownlow votes. He played twelve matches in his first season, missing much of the year with a knee injury. In his second season, he played every match, won the VFL Players Association MVP Award and the Carji Greeves Medal. He set new records for handpassing, with 399 handpasses for the season – a record which would stand until 2006 – and with 28 handpasses in the Round 22 match against Fitzroy – a record which would be tied several times, but not broken until 2008.

=== Sydney Swans ===
At the end of 1985, when Hafey took the job as coach of the Sydney Swans after being sacked by Geelong, Williams was promptly offered a sizeable contract to follow Hafey to Sydney. Williams was reported to have been offered roughly double the money he was on at Geelong. Williams accepted, and the deal was done with a transfer fee of $120,000 between the clubs, which was much less than the $200,000 that Geelong had sought.

Williams continued his strong form into his career with Sydney. In 1986, his first season there, Williams won the Brownlow Medal in a tie with Hawthorn's Robert DiPierdomenico, and made the All-Australian team for the first time; he would back this up with his second All-Australian selection in 1987, and he placed third for the Brownlow in 1989. In Round 19, 1989, Williams amassed 53 disposals, which is the second highest ever recorded in a VFL/AFL match; it included another haul of 28 handpasses, and his career best tally of six goals.

=== Transfer to Carlton ===
During 1991, Williams decided that he wanted to return to Melbourne the following season, and St Kilda and Carlton emerged as the two potential candidates. Since the introduction of the AFL draft in 1986, Williams' move would need to take place as a trade, rather than with a transfer fee as had been the case under his first move. Ultimately, St Kilda was not willing to agree to Sydney's requested trade, which would have included future dual-Brownlow Medallist Robert Harvey, and as a result Williams was traded to Carlton. In the end, a three-way trade involving Fitzroy was negotiated, with Simon Minton-Connell traded from Carlton to Sydney, Darren Kappler traded from Fitzroy to Sydney, Peter Sartori and Ashley Matthews traded from Carlton to Fitzroy, and Williams traded from Sydney to Carlton. Williams was estimated to be on a contract worth more than $300,000 per year (equivalent to $892,811 in 2022), which was then the highest contract in the history of the sport.

=== Carlton ===
After a solid 1992, Williams returned to career-best form for Carlton in 1993 and 1994. He finished second in the Brownlow Medal in 1993, one vote behind winner Gavin Wanganeen. In 1994, he polled 30 votes to win the award; he was the tenth player to win the Brownlow Medal twice, and the third to do so at different clubs. Additionally in 1994, he won the AFL Players Association MVP Award for the second time, becoming the first player to win the award twice; he won the Robert Reynolds Trophy as Carlton's best and fairest for the only time in his career. He was also All-Australian in both 1993 and 1994 – the former as vice-captain, and the latter as captain. He won the first and only premiership of his VFL/AFL career with Carlton in 1995, and he won the Norm Smith Medal with five goals in the Grand Final. He was the first player to win a Brownlow Medal, Premiership Medallion, and Norm Smith Medal across his career.

Williams played two more seasons, before retiring at the end of a controversial 1997 season which saw a protracted legal battle between the AFL and Carlton over a suspension Williams received from the tribunal. He finished his career with 250 senior games: 34 with Geelong, 107 with Sydney, 109 with Carlton and 9 for Victoria in State of Origin matches. In his league career he accumulated 3600 handpasses; this was more than five hundred more than any other player before him, so prolific was his use of handpass, and it remained the record until 2006. As of the end of the 2024 season, his career average of 26.9 disposals per game remains the record for retired players, and his career average of 14.4 handpasses per game was the record among retired players until the retirement of Daniel Cross in 2015.^{Note 2,}

== Statistics ==
Legend
G	Goals	K	Kicks	D	Disposals	T	Tackles
B	Behinds	H	Handballs	M	Marks
#	Played in that season's premiership team

Led the league for the season only
Led the league after finals only
Led the league after season and finals

Season	Team	No.	Games	Totals							Averages (per game)						
Season	Team	No.	Games	G	B	K	H	D	M	T	G	B	K	H	D	M	T
1984	Geelong	11	12	4	5	154	158	312	37	—N/a	0.3	0.4	12.8	13.2	26.0	3.1	—N/a
1985	Geelong	11	22	6	8	276	399	675	81	—N/a	0.3	0.4	12.5	18.1	30.7	3.7	—N/a
1986	Sydney	2	24	28	21	311	379	690	90	—N/a	1.2	0.9	13.0	15.8	28.8	3.8	—N/a
1987	Sydney	2	22	21	11	255	332	587	56	46	1.0	0.5	11.6	15.1	26.7	2.5	2.2
1988	Sydney	2	18	20	14	280	249	529	64	34	1.1	0.8	15.6	13.8	29.4	3.6	1.9
1989	Sydney	2	17	19	23	214	258	472	63	28	1.1	1.4	12.6	15.2	27.8	3.7	1.6
1990	Sydney	2	11	17	6	164	185	349	46	18	1.5	0.5	14.9	16.8	31.7	4.2	1.6
1991	Sydney	2	15	13	16	163	249	412	44	21	0.9	1.1	10.9	16.6	27.5	2.9	1.1
1992	Carlton	2	16	2	10	204	185	389	58	28	0.1	0.6	12.8	11.6	24.3	3.6	1.8
1993	Carlton	2	23	21	9	297	367	664	84	29	0.9	0.4	12.9	16.0	28.9	3.7	1.3
1994	Carlton	2	22	15	12	278	364	642	56	40	0.7	0.5	12.6	16.5	29.2	2.5	1.8
1995^{#}	Carlton	2	17	29	15	185	179	364	63	21	1.7	0.9	10.9	10.5	21.4	3.7	1.2
1996	Carlton	2	18	11	7	169	161	330	51	18	0.6	0.4	9.4	8.9	18.3	2.8	1.0
1997	Carlton	2	13	11	9	171	135	306	52	20	0.8	0.7	13.2	10.4	23.5	4.0	1.5
Career			250	217	166	3121	3600	6721	845	303	0.9	0.7	12.5	14.4	26.9	3.4	1.6

== Honours and achievements ==
**Brownlow Medal votes**
Season	Votes
1984	7
1985	15
**1986**	**17**
1987	13
1988	2
1989	16
1990	7
1991	8
1992	6
1993	17
**1994**	**30**
1995	6
1996	7
1997	3
**Total**	**154**
Key:
Green / **Bold** = Won

Team

- AFL Premiership (Carlton): 1995
- McClelland Trophy (Carlton): 1995
- Ansett Australia Cup (Carlton): 1997

Individual

- 2× Brownlow Medal: 1986, 1994
- 2× Leigh Matthews Trophy (AFLPA MVP Award): 1985, 1994
- 4× All-Australian: 1986, 1987, 1993, 1994
- John Nicholls Medal: 1994
- Australian Football Media Association Player of the Year Award: 1994
- 2× Herald Sun Player of the Year Award: 1993, 1994
- Norm Smith Medal: 1995
- Australian Football Hall of Fame Inductee: 2001
- Carlton Football Club Hall of Fame Inductee: 1999
- Sydney Swans Hall of Fame Inductee: 2009
- **AFL Team of the Century - Interchange Bench**
- **Carlton Football Club Team of the Century – Centre**
- **South Melbourne/Sydney Swans Team of the Century – Centre**

== Controversy ==
Williams was a controversial figure during his career.

Tribunal record

Williams frequently found himself in trouble with umpires and had many tribunal appearances – often as the result of overzealous retaliation against his taggers. He was charged a total of 19 times, found guilty 12 times, and suspended for a total of 34 matches during his career. He was also known for his generally impolite treatment of umpires, and the Tribunal found him guilty of verbally abusing an umpire on three occasions, for which he was twice fined and once suspended.

Illegal player payments

In February 1992, it was uncovered that both Williams and the Sydney Swans had breached the league's salary regulations. Williams had received additional, undeclared payments via one of Sydney's sponsors during the 1990 season, with both the club and the player aware of the rort. Both plead guilty to the AFL. The club was fined $50,000, and Williams was fined $25,000 and de-registered by the league for eleven weeks. Williams was in his first pre-season with Carlton at the time, and his debut for the club was delayed until Round 7 as a result of the deregistration.

1993 Brownlow Medal

When Williams finished one vote behind winner Gavin Wanganeen for the 1993 Brownlow Medal, it was noted that Williams had received no votes in Carlton's nine-goal victory against Melbourne in Round 10 at Princes Park – a match in which Williams accumulated 44 disposals, kicked a goal and was generally thought to have been the most dominant player on the ground. The votes in that game attracted some media attention at the time, and Williams' poor relationship with umpires was often considered to have been a factor in his failure to poll votes. In 2006, one of the umpires in that match, Murray Bird, alleged this to be true, stating that he had wanted to award votes to Williams, but that his more senior colleague on the day, John Russo, had overruled him on the basis of Williams' negative attitude towards him. Russo denied the allegations. Williams briefly considered a legal challenge for the 1993 Brownlow Medal, but did not proceed.

Racial vilification

In August 1995, Williams was charged with racially vilifying West Coast Eagles opponent Chris Lewis, after referring to him as a "black c***" during a match; he was one of the first players charged under an AFL rule, introduced in June 1995, which was specific to racial vilification. The case was settled with a public apology from Williams to Lewis; no penalty was imposed. It was not the only incident between the two players in their careers, with Lewis suspended for spitting at Williams in a match in 1993.

Suspension appealed through the courts

Williams was involved in a particularly controversial tribunal case following an incident in Round 1 1997. After the final siren of Carlton's match against Essendon, umpire Andrew Coates stepped in to break up a small conflict between Williams and Essendon's Sean Denham. Williams pushed Coates in the chest to continue the exchange with Denham. The contact was not violent in nature, but was forceful enough to knock Coates off balance. Coates did not report Williams for the incident, but after viewing video footage, the AFL brought its own report against Williams to the tribunal. He was found guilty of "undue interference with an umpire" and suspended for nine matches.

Because the length of the suspension would have personally cost Williams $100,000 in match payments, Carlton decided to challenge the decision in the Supreme Court of Victoria; at the time, there was no Appeals Board at the AFL Tribunal, so the courts were the only place to appeal decisions. An injunction against the suspension was awarded on the Friday after the match, allowing Williams to continue playing until the case was heard (although he did have to serve a three-week suspension for a kneeing offence committed the very next week). Prior to Round 10, the court overturned the nine-week suspension, with Justice John Hedigan making direct recommendation that the AFL Tribunal establish its own appeals process as part of his judgement. The AFL then appealed Hedigan's decision in the Victorian Court of Appeal, and the three justices found in the AFL's favour (by a majority of 2–1), and re-instated Williams' nine-week suspension, to be served starting in Round 17. Carlton attempted to take the case to the High Court of Australia, but the High Court rejected the application. Altogether, Carlton suffered more than $400,000 in legal costs. Williams served six matches of the suspension before retiring at the end of the season. The AFL did act on Hedigan's recommendation, and established an Appeals Board for the 1998 season.

== Personal life ==
Williams has a son, Jake, who trained with Carlton in the 2007 pre-season, but was ultimately not drafted to the AFL. Jake was eligible to be selected by either Carlton or Sydney under the father–son rule.

== Health ==
In February 2013 it was reported that Williams was among a group of seven former AFL and NRL players who were tested by researchers at Deakin University and found to have symptoms of chronic traumatic encephalopathy (CTE), a degenerative condition which has affected some athletes who have had a history of severe concussions and other head traumas. It was reported that Williams was suffering memory loss, including that he no longer recalls many specific details about some of his greatest football achievements, such as Carlton's 1995 premiership game.

== Notes ==
:1. Match statistics for kicks, handpasses and disposals are available only since 1965.
:2. Limited to players with fifty or more league games played.
