= Scott Wynd =

Australian rules footballer, born 1970

Personal information
- Born: 25 January 1970 (age 56); Jacana, Victoria
- Original team: Jacana
- Height: 201 cm (6 ft 7 in)
- Weight: 108 kg (238 lb)

Playing career^{1}
Years	Club	Games (Goals)
1988–2000	Footscray/Western Bulldogs	237 (31)
- ^{1} Playing statistics correct to the end of 2000.

Career highlights
- Charles Sutton Medal: 1992; Footscray/Western Bulldogs captain: 1994–2000; Brownlow Medal: 1992; All-Australian Team: 1992; Western Bulldogs Team of the Century

Scott Wynd (born 25 January 1970) is a former Australian rules footballer who played in the Australian Football League, playing with Footscray.

== AFL career ==
Debuting in 1988, the 201 cm ruckman was the winner of the 1992 Brownlow Medal after team mate Tony Liberatore won it in 1990. He was also the captain of Footscray/Western Bulldogs from 1994 until his retirement at the end of the 2000 season. Wynd is widely considered one of the best ruckmen of the modern era.

== Playing statistics ==
Legend
G	Goals	K	Kicks	D	Disposals	T	Tackles
B	Behinds	H	Handballs	M	Marks

Season	Team	No.	Games	Totals							Averages (per game)						
Season	Team	No.	Games	G	B	K	H	D	M	T	G	B	K	H	D	M	T
1988	Footscray	52	1	0	0	4	0	4	0	0	0.0	0.0	4.0	0.0	4.0	0.0	0.0
1989	Footscray	15	20	5	3	94	125	219	67	25	0.3	0.2	4.7	6.3	11.0	3.4	1.3
1990	Footscray	15	14	1	0	58	105	163	42	15	0.1	0.0	4.1	7.5	11.6	3.0	1.1
1991	Footscray	15	20	5	1	85	255	340	135	23	0.3	0.1	4.3	12.8	17.0	6.8	1.2
1992	Footscray	15	24	0	0	155	278	433	143	28	0.0	0.0	6.5	11.6	18.0	6.0	1.2
1993	Footscray	15	19	2	0	108	189	297	107	27	0.1	0.0	5.7	9.9	15.6	5.6	1.4
1994	Footscray	15	9	9	3	31	40	71	24	6	1.0	0.3	3.4	4.4	7.9	2.7	0.7
1995	Footscray	15	19	2	1	94	163	257	72	17	0.1	0.1	4.9	8.6	13.5	3.8	0.9
1996	Footscray	15	21	0	0	71	200	271	67	19	0.0	0.0	3.4	9.5	12.9	3.2	0.9
1997	Western Bulldogs	15	23	3	2	97	194	291	83	30	0.1	0.1	4.2	8.4	12.7	3.6	1.3
1998	Western Bulldogs	15	22	1	1	83	240	323	78	18	0.0	0.0	3.8	10.9	14.7	3.5	0.8
1999	Western Bulldogs	15	23	1	0	85	183	268	47	24	0.0	0.0	3.7	8.0	11.7	2.0	1.0
2000	Western Bulldogs	15	22	2	2	75	128	203	56	33	0.1	0.1	3.4	5.8	9.2	2.5	1.5
Career			237	31	13	1040	2100	3140	921	265	0.1	0.1	4.4	8.9	13.2	3.9	1.1

== Honours and achievements ==
**Brownlow Medal votes**
Season	Votes
1988	—
1989	3
1990	3
1991	12
**1992**	**20**
1993	12
1994	—
1995	9
1996	5
1997	4
1998	12
1999	8
2000	3
**Total**	**91**
Key:
Green / **Bold** = Won

- **Individual**
  - Brownlow Medal: 1992
  - Charles Sutton Medal (Footscray F.C. Best & Fairest): 1992
  - All-Australian: 1992
  - Footscray F.C./Western Bulldogs Captain: 1994-2000
  - **Footscray F.C. Team of the Century: Interchange**

== Family ==
Wynd's father Garrey Wynd played two games for Melbourne in 1966 and his brother Paul Wynd played three games for North Melbourne in 1997.
