= Wynd (disambiguation) =

A wynd is a narrow lane between houses.

Wynd or WYND may refer to:

- WYND (AM), a radio station (1310 AM) licensed to serve DeLand, Florida, United States
- WYND-FM, a radio station (95.5 FM) licensed to serve Silver Springs, Florida
- Wynd (comic), comic series written by James Tynion IV
- WKHC, a radio station (97.1 FM) licensed to serve Hatteras, North Carolina, United States, which held the call sign WYND-FM from 1989 to 2000 and from 2003 to 2019

== People with the name ==
- Donna Wynd (born 1961), cyclist from New Zealand
- Garrey Wynd (born 1946), Australian rules footballer who played with Melbourne
- Jim Wynd (born 1964), Australian rules footballer who played with Fitzroy
- Oswald Wynd (1913–1998), Scottish writer
- Paul Wynd (born 1976), Australian rules footballer who played with North Melbourne
- Phil Wynd (born 1946), Australian rules footballer who played with Hawthorn
- Ray Wynd (1921–2003), Australian rules footballer who played with North Melbourne
- Scott Wynd (born 1970), Australian rules footballer who played with Footscray
- Viktor Wynd, artist and author

== See also ==
- Wynde
