= Peter Riccardi =

Australian rules footballer, born 1972

Personal information
- Full name: Peter Riccardi
- Born: 17 December 1972 (age 53)
- Original team: West St. Peters / Geelong U19
- Height: 183 cm (6 ft 0 in)
- Weight: 92 kg (203 lb)

Playing career^{1}
| Years | Club | Games (Goals) |
| 1992–2006 | Geelong | 288 (286) |
- ^{1} Playing statistics correct to the end of 2006.

Career highlights
- AFL: VFL/AFL Italian Team of the Century 2007; Geelong Football Club: Best and Fairest 1998

Peter Riccardi (born 17 December 1972) is a former Australian rules footballer for the Geelong Football Club in the Australian Football League (AFL).

== Career ==
=== Early career ===
Of Italian and Argentine descent, Riccardi made his debut for Geelong in Round 4, 1992 against West Coast, a real foe of Riccardi's, who he faced in the losing Grand Finals of 1992 and 1994.

Riccardi's raking left foot helped him win the 1998 Carji Greeves Medal. He famously won a game against Carlton with a 50m goal after the siren in 2002.

Riccardi had played 282 games at the end of the 2005 season and struggled to return to the side in 2006, playing just 3 games in the first part of the year. He returned in Round 17 and performed well in Round 18 against Brisbane with 3 goals, but in Round 19 against St Kilda, Riccardi's career was effectively ended when he suffered a hamstring injury. His career finished with the disappointment of being close to the coveted 300 game mark and playing in three Grand Finals, he never won a premiership.

In 2007, he was named on a half forward flank in the VFL/AFL Italian Team of the Century.

== Honours ==
**Brownlow Medal votes**
| Season | Votes |
| 1992 | 4 |
| 1993 | — |
| 1994 | — |
| 1995 | 10 |
| 1996 | 10 |
| 1997 | 7 |
| 1998 | 2 |
| 1999 | 5 |
| 2000 | 5 |
| 2001 | — |
| 2002 | 10 |
| 2003 | — |
| 2004 | 7 |
| 2005 | — |
| 2006 | — |
| **Total** | **56** |
Key:
Green / **Bold** = Won
Red / Italics = Ineligible

- Individual:
  - Carji Greeves Medal: 1998
  - VFL/AFL Italian Team of the Century: 2007
  - Member of the Geelong F.C. Hall of Fame
- Other achievements:
  - 907th player to play a match for Geelong
  - Seventh-most games played for Geelong (288 games)
  - 17th-most goals scored for Geelong (286 goals)
  - 10,310th player to play a match in the VFL/AFL
