= Media in Melbourne =

Relative to most other Australian cities, Melbourne media is unusual in its size and diversity.

== Newspapers ==
Melbourne has two major daily newspapers, the compact format The Age owned by Nine Entertainment, and the News Corp Australia owned tabloid format Herald Sun. The Herald Sun was created from the merger of the morning tabloid newspaper The Sun and the afternoon broadsheet newspaper The Herald in 1990. A third major paper, The Argus was discontinued in 1957. The weekly Melbourne Observer newspaper was established in 1969. It is available free in print, and online at www.MelbourneObserver.com.au. The Local Paper group has locailised editions across all suburbs of Melbourne, the Mornington Peninsula, and per-urban areas.They are available free in print, and online at www.LocalPaper.com.au

Melbourne is served by various newspapers published in languages other than English. These include newspapers published in Melbourne and those published elsewhere. There is also a wide variety of street press available in Melbourne. There are a variety of free, weekly newspapers focused on local suburban regions. These are usually distributed to households without subscription. The free afternoon tabloid format mX was a brief attempt at reviving the afternoon newspaper in Melbourne.

== Television ==
Melbourne is served by six free-to-air television networks. The three commercial television providers, the Seven Network, the Nine Network and Network 10 have commenced broadcasting new sub-channels including 7HD, 7two, 7mate, 7flix, 7Bravo, 9HD, 9Gem, 9Go!, 9Life, 9Rush, 10 HD, 10 Comedy, 10 Drama, Nickelodeon. The Australian Broadcasting Corporation provides five channels, ABC (also available in High Definition), ABC Family, ABC Kids, ABC Entertains and ABC News from their Southbank studios. The Special Broadcasting Service television also provides six television channels, SBS (also available in High Definition), SBS2, SBS World Movies, SBS WorldWatch, SBS Food and NITV. C31 Melbourne is a public access community television station which screens mostly foreign-language television for migrant communities, and amateur lifestyle programs.

Melbourne has a large and thriving television industry that along with Sydney, produces most of the Australian prime-time television content. Melbourne produced television series include Neighbours, Kath & Kim, Hey Hey It's Saturday, The Footy Show (AFL), Blue Heelers, Dancing with the Stars, Steven Spielberg's The Pacific, Rush, Underbelly, Thank God You're Here, Rove Live, Summer Heights High, The Project, The Marngrook Footy Show, Millionaire Hot Seat, Deal Or No Deal, The Chase Australia, Family Feud, Offspring, The Panel, The Real Housewives of Melbourne, Winners & Losers and House Husbands.

The ABC has a large headquarters and production facility in the inner-city suburb of Southbank, SBS studios at Federation Square, C31 at Melbourne city, Nine at Docklands (previously Richmond), 10 at South Yarra (previously Nunawading) and Seven at Docklands (previously South Melbourne).

Melbourne is also served by paid subscription television services Foxtel, Optus TV and UBI World TV.

== Radio ==
Melbourne has a wide range of radio stations. For 2010, the Nielsen Company estimates the Melbourne radio market has 3,840,000 listeners.

=== Sports radio ===
Melbourne has several radio stations dedicated to sports broadcasting. One such station is 1116 SEN, which took over 3AK's old radio licence and replaced it with a 24-hour sports format.

RSN Racing & Sport (formerly known as 3UZ) covers all sports but specialises in total coverage of Horse Racing, Harness Racing and Greyhounds.

Triple M, while generally focused on music broadcasting, is noted for its sports coverage (with hourly sports updates from personalities including Brett Phillips). Since the 2017 season, Triple M broadcasts every Australian Football League (AFL) game, every week. In October 2005 there were four Victorian radio stations that had the rights to broadcast AFL matches: Triple M, 3AW, ABC and K-Rock.

3AW's sport coverage consists of the show Sports Today with Dwayne Russell and Gerard Healy, as well as its AFL coverage.

ABC Radio Melbourne's sports coverage includes the Coodabeen Champions who are an AFL-comedy-music group (made up of Ian Cover, Billy Baxter, Torch McGee, Geoff Richardson and Greg Champion) that broadcast from 10 AM to midday each Saturday during the AFL Premiership season. They also cover a wide variety of sporting events, including taking BBC Sport's Test Match Special, the Australian Open, and international and domestic cricket.

=== Talk radio ===
The most notable locally produced talk radio stations are ABC Radio Melbourne (part of the ABC Local Radio network), and 3AW which often achieves the highest ratings. Both stations feature extensive local news coverage and talkback. 1116 SEN is also a talk station focused on sports. Melbourne is also served by SBS Radio which broadcasts in a variety of languages, aimed at migrant communities.

=== Community radio ===
Australia's most successful community radio station, 3RRR, is a Melbourne institution. SYN FM, at 90.7 FM, another community station, is staffed and presented entirely by youth up to age 26. Other community stations in Melbourne include 3PBS, which plays mostly specialist music programming, and 3CR, an AM radio station run by a broad coalition of left-wing activists. Melbourne is also home to Australia's first and only gay and lesbian community radio station, JOY 94.9.

In addition to the major players in Melbourne, there are many smaller radio stations catering to particular community interests. 3CR caters to a diverse range of community groups and community languages, 3XY 1422AM provides Greek language programming, 1593AM (Rete Italia) presents 24 hr/day Italian, 3CW 1341AM Chinese, and Pacific Islanders are now catered to on 3XX 1611AM which is better known for its 80s and 90s music during the day, and 3KND presents indigenous community programming. The FM band also features smaller suburban stations, and low powered services in various suburbs featuring programming ranging from dance music to English radio, Arabic programming and more. Light FM on 89.9 FM is Melbourne's community Christian station with the slogan of "Good friends, great music and a message of hope".

=== Music radio ===
Melbourne has eight analogue music formatted radio stations. There are eight commercial (six on FM and two on AM) music stations, and the ABC's national music station, Triple J. Fox FM and Nova 100 compete directly with a Contemporary Hit format targeting the under 40s. Triple M has an adult oriented rock format and features live AFL coverage on the weekends during winter. KIIS 101.1 (previously Mix 101.1) is more female oriented with a hot adult contemporary format that is aimed at 25–54. Smooth 91.5 (previously, Vega and Classic Rock) is Melbourne's newest commercial station and is now broadcasting a middle of the road/adult contemporary format that largely appeals to those aged 35+. Gold 104.3 is also aimed 40+, with adult contemporary/gold formats with music primarily from the 80s and 90s. Magic 1278 is a music station playing a format targeting 35+ audiences with music from the 80s, 90s and 2000s. 3MP also targets the 55+ with an easy listening Format.

=== Digital radio ===
Digital radio commenced in Melbourne on the 11 May 2009 and uses the DAB+ standard. Melbourne currently has 55 digital stations. DAB+ reception is good in most of the metropolitan area but it is still patchy in fringe areas (in particular Geelong and the Mornington Peninsula). Digital stations have the advantage of a translator in the Melbourne CBD that provides better signal quality than analogue services in some Inner East and central suburbs.

All of Melbourne's commercial, ABC, SBS stations, as well as Melbourne-wide community stations, simulcast their analogue broadcast on digital. The ABC, SBS and commercial networks also run additional digital only programmes. Digital stations include pop-up seasonal or festival formats, additional news, sport and specialist music genres such as dance, indie, jazz, chillout, country, love songs, Australian music, unsigned artists, Asian, Arabic as well as eighties and nineties only formats. Many of the digital stations are national formats and even those run by commercial stations are largely free from advertising at this stage.

== Melbourne-based online news outlets ==
Crikey, The New Daily and New Matilda are online general news publications each with a small staff of journalists.

While not as big as any of the major outlets some of Melbourne's online specialist news media continue to grow. Due to the city's enthusiasm for events and food many successful outlets tend to cover these topics. The most widely read being Broadsheet.

Property and art/design are also a popular topics, serviced by Domain, RealEstate.com.au, ArtsHub and The Design Files.

== See also ==
- Television broadcasting in Australia
- List of Australian radio stations
- List of Melbourne radio stations by frequency
- Newspapers in Australia
