= Trading Post (newspaper) =

Newspaper in Melbourne, Australia (1966–2009)

- Frequency: Weekly
- Publisher: Telstra
- Founder: Charles Falkiner; Margaret Wilkins
- First issue: 1966
- Final issue: 2009
- Country: Australia
- Based in: Melbourne
- Language: Australian English
- Website: www.tradingpost.com.au
- ISSN: 0736-3451

The Trading Post was a classified advertisement newspaper first published in Melbourne in 1966, named for the generic concept of a trading post. After changing hands a number of times, in 2004, the company, which had grown nationally to 22 print publications and five related websites, was bought for $636 million by Telstra. In April 2009, it ceased printing and moved to an online format.

== History ==
=== Melbourne ===
The original founders of the Trading Post, Charles Falkiner and Margaret Wilkins, started the newspaper in 1966 using an initial outlay of $24,000. In 1968, the newspaper expanded operations in both Sydney and Brisbane, with the Adelaide, Perth, Tasmania, Darwin and Canberra editions were established during the 1980s and 1990s. It first went online in 1996.

=== Adelaide ===
A suburban Adelaide edition, selling or buying used goods, was published fortnightly, later weekly, under various names for 41 years:

- The Adelaide Private Trader (21 March 1978 – 25 July 1985) - from edition number 95, 28 November 1981, it was subtitled "incorporating Adelaide Trading Post" which had existed as a separate rival publication since 5 September 1968.
- Adelaide Trading Post (8 August 1985 – 27 May 1993)
- Weekly Trading Post (3 June 1993 – 15 July 2004) - from 2002, when the rural edition ceased, it was subtitled "Adelaide and country SA".
- Trading Post (22 July 2004 – October 2009)

A number of rural South Australian editions, using the same format, were also published:

- SA's Country Trader (1992-1993)
- Local Trading Post [Clare] (1993-1994)
- Local Trading Post [Mount Gambier] (1994)
- Green Triangle Trading Post (1994-1995)
- Country Trading Post (1994–1995)
- Rural Trading Post (1995–2002)

The State Library of South Australia has physical and microfilm versions of the South Australian version of the publication available from edition 1, March 1978.

=== Owner ===
The original company changed hands numerous times before being purchased in 1998 by Trader Media, a Dutch-owned company. In March 2004, Trading Post was bought by Telstra for $636 million. At the time of sale, the company had grown nationally to 22 print publications and five related websites.

In October 2009, in the face of a massive shift to virtual advertising, it moved to being a website based publication only. The shift resulted in 279 positions across nine locations being made redundant. At the time of transition, it had an average of 469,000 readers a week, while the website received 1.8 million unique hits per month. According to Telstra at the time of the sale, "the most popular Trading Post categories are pets and horses, household furniture and goods, wheels, tyres and parts, home renovations, rural and machinery, gardens and outdoor living, business and office, and sport, leisure and recreation."

In 2012, an attempt to sell the business to Carsales collapsed after the Australian Competition & Consumer Commission opposed it. It was later privately acquired by a group of digital entrepreneurs.

== In popular culture ==
Trading Post was most famously referenced in the 1997 Australian movie, The Castle.

== See also ==
- Media in Melbourne
