= Frank Carbone =

Frank Carbone may refer to:

- Frank Carbone (footballer) (born 1965), Australian rules footballer
- Frank Carbone (politician), mayor of the City of Fairfield
- Frankie Carbone, character in Goodfellas
- Western Sydney Community, abbreviated "Frank Carbone", Australian political party
