= Louisa Angelina Santospirito =

Australian community worker (1895–1983)

- Born: Louisa Angelina Virgona; 4 April 1895; Ballarat, Victoria, Australia
- Died: 19 November 1983 (aged 88); Camberwell, Melbourne, Australia
- Burial place: Melbourne General Cemetery
- Occupations: Charity worker, telephonist
- Known for: Assistance to Italian immigrants post WWII
- Awards: Knight of the Order of the Star of Italian Solidarity

Louisa Angelina Santospirito (née Virgona; 4 April 1895 – 19 November 1983), known affectionately as Lena, was an Australian community worker who aided Italian immigrants in Australia during and after World War II. She served for fifteen years as president of the archbishop's committee, established by Melbourne Archbishop Daniel Mannix after Australia began interning Italian civilians in World War II. She was awarded the Star of Italian Solidarity in 1953.

== Biography ==
Louisa Angelina Virgona, known by the nickname Lena, was born on 4 April 1895 in Ballarat, Victoria. Her parents, Bartolo and Barolina Virgona, were Italian immigrants who had come to Australia from the town of Malfa, located on the island of Salina, in the Aeolian Islands. Her father Bartolo, arrived in 1890, establishing a business as a green grocer. His wife, Bartolina, and their eldest child Vincent arrived in 1892. Lena was the fourth and last of the couple's children. In addition to her brother Vincent, she had two older sisters, Maria and Rosa. Not long after Lena's birth, the family moved to Fitzroy, Melbourne. Lena attended St. Joseph's School and later Catholic Ladies College. In 1913, she began working as a telephone operator at the Postmaster General's office; she worked for twelve years, until her marriage.

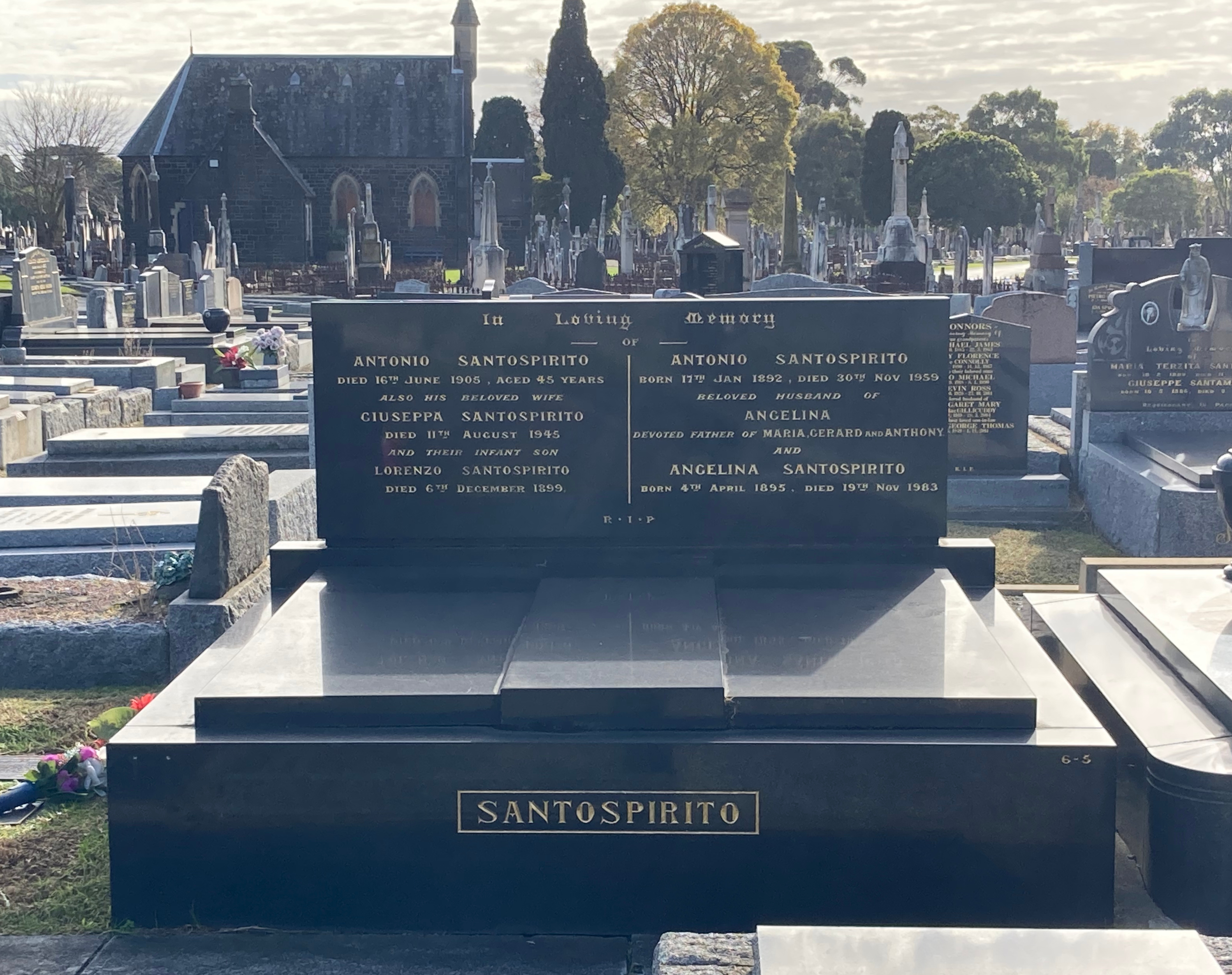
Santospirito's grave at Melbourne General Cemetery

She married Antonio Santospirito, a flower merchant, in 1925. Antonio had been born in Salina in 1892. Like Lena's family, the Santospirito family had immigrated to Australia from the Aeolian Islands in the 1890s. Together, Antonio and Lena had three children: Gerard, Maria and Antonio.

As a volunteer, Lena worked closely with Father De Francesco and Father Ugo Modotti, who served as chaplains to the Italian community in Melbourne. Her sister, Mary, also assisted in this charitable work, responding to the needs of Italian immigrants. Through this work, Lena was asked to take on leadership in the establishment of the Archbishop's committee, established in July 1940, to aid Italian civilians detained in internment camps, and Italian prisoners of war being held in Australia. She served on this committee for fifteen years.

Antonio Santospirito died in 1959. Lena Santospirito died on 19 November 1983, in Camberwell, Melbourne, and was buried at Melbourne General Cemetery. Her papers are housed at the Italian Historical Society, located in Carlton, Victoria.

== Assisting Italian immigrants ==
By the time of Santospirito's birth, there were about 1500 Italians living in Victoria, Australia, many of whom had been lured by the discovery of gold. While quotas had been set in 1928 to limit the number of Italians who could enter the country, immigration continued throughout the early years of the 20th century. By the 1940s there were about 33,000 Italians living in Australia.

In 1940, after entering World War II, the Australian government began interning Italian-born civilians who were not naturalized. In response, Archbishop Daniel Mannix established an archbishop's committee to serve the needs of Italians in the camps. The committee also provided relief for Italian prisoners of war being held in Australia. Santospirito was appointed president of the committee, and would serve in this role for the next fifteen years.

After the war, the archbishop's committee sent relief to the war-torn country of Italy, and provided aid to newly arrived Italian immigrants in Victoria. Santospirito's home became the center of this charitable work. She organized events to raise money to help new immigrants, including dances. She personally sponsored many individuals seeking to enter the country. In

Santospirito stepped down as president of the archbishop's committee in 1955, after fifteen years at the helm. In 1959, she received the Italian Star of Solidarity in honor of her work.

In 1947, Melbourne was home to more than 8,000 Italian immigrants. This number would increase to over 91,000 by 1960. Many of these new arrivals had been assisted by Lena Santospirito personally or benefitted from her charitable work.

== Awards and recognition ==
The Italian government awarded Santospirito the Italian Star of Solidarity on 31 July 1953. She was named to the Victorian Honour Roll of Women in 2001.

== See also ==
- Italian community of Melbourne
- Italian Australians
- Archbishop Daniel Mannix
