= Sports Today =

Sports radio show on Melbourne, Australia

Sports Today is a long-running radio show on Melbourne, Australia radio station 3AW. It currently airs on Monday to Thursday from 6 pm to 8 pm and is hosted by Jimmy Bartel.

It has been running for over 12 years and is the highest rating sports radio show in Melbourne. The show has previously been titled Sportsday and Wide World of Sports.

== History ==
Previously, it was hosted by David Hookes and Gerard Healy. On the first show after Hookes' death, Healy provided a memorable and emotional ode to his great mate.

Dwayne Russell took over the co-host role following this incident in early 2004 and remained as co-host until 2019 when Russell moved to rival station SEN. McClure took over Russell since 2020.

Healy hosted the show until December 2022. In November 2024, it was announced that McClure will be replaced by Jimmy Bartel from February 2025. McClure's last show was on 5 December 2024.
