= Peter Moore (Australian rules footballer) =

Australian rules footballer, born 1957

Personal information
- Full name: Peter Moore
- Born: 11 January 1957 (age 69)
- Original team: Eltham
- Height: 198 cm (6 ft 6 in)
- Weight: 97 kg (214 lb)
- Position: Ruckman

Playing career^{1}
| Years | Club | Games (Goals) |
| 1974–1982 | Collingwood | 172 (193) |
| 1983–1987 | Melbourne | 77 (51) |
| Total | | 249 (244) |
- ^{1} Playing statistics correct to the end of 1987.

Career highlights
- VFL: 2× Brownlow Medal: 1979, 1984; All-Australian team: 1979; 2× Collingwood Best & Fairest: 1979–1980; 2× Collingwood leading goal kicker: 1977–1978; Collingwood captain: 1981–1982; Australian Football Hall of Fame; Representative: National Football Carnival Championship: 1980

Peter Moore (born 11 January 1957) is a former Australian rules footballer who played for Collingwood and Melbourne in the Victorian Football League (VFL).

== Early life and education ==
As a student at Eltham High School, Moore excelled in both academic and sporting events. He played for the Eltham Football Club before being selected to play for Collingwood.

== Sporting career ==
A tall, agile ruckman with good ball skills, Moore is one of only five men to have won Brownlow Medals at different clubs; with Collingwood in 1979 and with Melbourne in 1984.

Winner of the Copeland Trophy in 1979 and 1980 and captain of Collingwood from 1981 to 1982, Moore was inducted into the Collingwood Hall of Fame before being transferred to the Melbourne Football Club.

Recurring hamstring injuries saw Moore's form drop off in his final seasons with Collingwood before being recruited by Melbourne, where his career took on a resurgence.

Moore played a total of 249 matches and was unlucky not to play in a premiership side considering he played in the Magpies' losing Grand Final teams of 1977, 1979, 1980 and 1981.

At the 1979 Perth State of Origin Carnival he was named in the All-Australian team.

After his VFL career finished, he coached Eltham Football Club, where he began his career, to a premiership in the second division of the Diamond Valley Football League in 1989.

In 2005, Moore was inducted into the Australian Football Hall of Fame.

When Collingwood lost the 1981 Grand Final to Carlton, the players were presented with runners-up medallions on the dais. Moore infamously threw his into the crowd. The runners-up medal was abolished.

In 2023, Moore presented the premiership cup to his son, Darcy Moore, after Collingwood won the 2023 AFL Grand Final.
