= Tony Liberatore =

Australian rules footballer (born 1966)

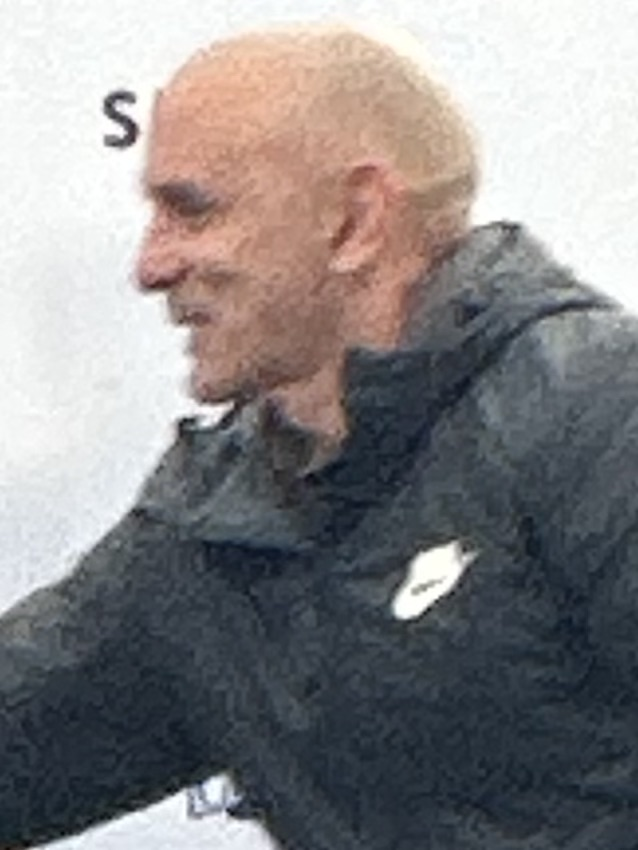
- Liberatore in 2025

Personal information
- Born: 11 February 1966 (age 60)
- Original teams: Brunswick City (EDFL)/ North Melbourne under-19s
- Height: 163 cm (5 ft 4 in)
- Weight: 78 kg (172 lb)

Playing career^{1}
Years	Club	Games (Goals)
1986–2002	Footscray/Western Bulldogs	283 (95)

Representative team honours
Years	Team	Games (Goals)
	Victoria	? (?)
- ^{1} Playing statistics correct to the end of 2002.

Career highlights
- Brownlow Medal: 1990; Charles Sutton Medal: 1991; Western Bulldogs Team of the Century; VFL/AFL Italian Team of the Century; 2× Gardiner Medal: 1986, 1988; Morrish Medal: 1984

Tony Liberatore (born 11 February 1966) is a former Australian rules footballer who represented the Western Bulldogs in the Australian Football League (AFL).

Liberatore is the only player to have won league best-and-fairest medals in all three grades of VFL/AFL football (under 19s, reserves and seniors). Liberatore is one of the shortest players to have played in the VFL/AFL competition and the shortest player to have won a Brownlow Medal.

Playing as a rover, Liberatore was a long-time holder of the VFL/AFL record for most career tackles.

== Early life ==
Liberatore was born in Australia to Italian parents.

== Playing career ==
=== Footscray/Western Bulldogs ===
Liberatore played junior football for Brunswick City. He was recruited by North Melbourne, where he played both under-19s and reserve grade football. After winning the Morrish Medal in 1984, he called Hawthorn, St Kilda and Footscray in the hope of playing senior football. Mick Malthouse, who was Footscray senior coach at the time, invited Liberatore to train but made no guarantees that he would get a game. At his first training session with the club, Liberatore was teased by full-forward Simon Beasley, who said that due to his lack of height he would have been better off training to be a jockey at the nearby Flemington Racecourse. Although Liberatore made his senior level debut in 1986, he mainly played in the reserves that season, winning the VFL reserves' Gardiner Medal in both 1986 and 1988. He was a member of the team that won the 1988 VFL reserves premiership.

Standing at 163 cm, Liberatore played only 18 senior games until the 1990 season, when he played 19 games and won the Brownlow Medal for the best and fairest senior AFL player. Despite missing the final 3 games of the season, his tally of 18 votes narrowly beat Graham Wright (Collingwood) with 17 votes and Stephen Silvagni (Carlton) on 16 votes.

Liberatore played a total of 283 senior games for Footscray/Western Bulldogs in a career that included 13 finals, life membership of the club, and selection on the interchange bench in the club's Team of the Century.

Liberatore was noted for his ability to read the play and his prolific tackling. Throughout his senior career, he made 1,225 tackles in his career^{Note}; an average of 4.39 per game. In 1992 he became the first VFL/AFL player to exceed 100 tackles in a season, and then exceeded 100 tackles each season until 1996. His season tally of 142 tackles in 1994 stood as the VFL/AFL record until 2006, when James McDonald bettered it by one.

Liberatore garnered an unwanted reputation following the 1999 Season Round 10 game against Brisbane at the Gabba. Whilst he denied eye gouging, his hand contact with the face of Craig McRae was deemed excessive, and he was suspended for 3 weeks. It was the first time he had been suspended for the act after previous incidents with Steven Lawrence (Brisbane) and Craig Kelly (Sydney).

Liberatore was responsible for an ugly off-the-ball incident against Matthew Knights in Round 2 of the 2001 season, which resulted in a suspension for five matches. The nature of the incident led many football pundits such as Robert Walls to call for his retirement.

== Playing statistics ==
Legend
G	Goals	K	Kicks	D	Disposals	T	Tackles
B	Behinds	H	Handballs	M	Marks

Season	Team	No.	Games	Totals							Averages (per game)						
Season	Team	No.	Games	G	B	K	H	D	M	T	G	B	K	H	D	M	T
1986	Footscray	60	4	1	1	19	22	41	5	—N/a	0.3	0.3	4.8	5.5	10.3	1.3	—N/a
1987	Footscray	39	12	7	11	102	70	172	10	23	0.6	0.9	8.5	5.8	14.3	0.8	1.9
1988	Footscray	39	1	0	0	4	6	10	1	1	0.0	0.0	4.0	6.0	10.0	1.0	1.0
1989	Footscray	39	1	0	0	12	2	14	1	3	0.0	0.0	12.0	2.0	14.0	1.0	3.0
1990	Footscray	39	19	13	8	249	245	494	33	82	0.7	0.4	13.1	12.9	26.0	1.7	4.3
1991	Footscray	39	22	13	9	301	296	597	29	62	0.6	0.4	13.7	13.5	27.1	1.3	2.8
1992	Footscray	39	25	14	4	326	286	612	47	136	0.6	0.2	13.0	11.4	24.5	1.9	5.4
1993	Footscray	39	20	12	8	250	238	488	27	115	0.6	0.4	12.5	11.9	24.4	1.4	5.8
1994	Footscray	39	24	6	9	280	211	491	26	142	0.3	0.4	11.7	8.8	20.5	1.1	5.9
1995	Footscray	39	23	9	6	304	234	538	36	116	0.4	0.3	13.2	10.2	23.4	1.6	5.0
1996	Footscray	39	22	6	6	250	232	482	24	111	0.3	0.3	11.4	10.5	21.9	1.1	5.0
1997	Western Bulldogs	39	24	8	4	237	196	433	40	95	0.3	0.2	9.9	8.2	18.0	1.7	4.0
1998	Western Bulldogs	39	9	0	3	49	51	100	16	25	0.0	0.3	5.4	5.7	11.1	1.8	2.8
1999	Western Bulldogs	39	21	2	3	197	154	351	28	69	0.1	0.1	9.4	7.3	16.7	1.3	3.3
2000	Western Bulldogs	39	23	3	6	204	230	434	56	99	0.1	0.3	8.9	10.0	18.9	2.4	4.3
2001	Western Bulldogs	39	17	1	3	120	150	270	26	90	0.1	0.2	7.1	8.8	15.9	1.5	5.3
2002	Western Bulldogs	39	16	0	2	60	90	150	22	56	0.0	0.1	3.8	5.6	9.4	1.4	3.5
Career			283	95	83	2964	2713	5677	427	1225	0.3	0.3	10.5	9.6	20.1	1.5	4.4

== Honours and achievements ==
**Brownlow Medal votes**
Season	Votes
1986	—
1987	4
1988	—
1989	—
**1990**	**18**
1991	2
1992	12
1993	4
1994	16
1995	14
1996	7
1997	10
1998	—
1999	8
2000	14
2001	3
2002	—
**Total**	**112**
Key:
Green / **Bold** = Won

Individual

- Brownlow Medal: 1990
- Charles Sutton Medal (Footscray F.C. Best & Fairest): 1991
- **Victorian Representative Honours**
- Gardiner Medal (VFA/VFL Best & Fairest): 1986, 1988
- Morrish Medal: 1984
- **Footscray F.C. Team of the Century - Interchange**
- **Italian Team of the Century - Interchange**

== Post-football and coaching career ==
=== Early coaching career ===
Liberatore coached the Box Hill Hawks in the Victorian Football League in 2003, taking them to the Grand Final.

=== Carlton Football Club assistant coach (2004-2007) ===
Between 2004 and 2007, he held an assistant coaching position at Carlton under senior coach Denis Pagan before Pagan was replaced by fellow Carlton assistant coach Brett Ratten as caretaker senior coach with six matches remaining in the 2007 season. However, as part of the changeover, Liberatore then departed the Carlton Football Club at the end of the 2007 season.

=== Other coaching roles ===
In 2008, he was the senior coach of the Sunbury Lions Football Club in the Ballarat Football League. In 2009, he became the senior coach of the West Footscray Roosters, a team playing in the Melbourne suburban Western Region Football League.

=== 2008 radio interview controversy ===
In a radio interview in the 2008 pre-season, Liberatore accused then Bulldogs CEO Campbell Rose of causing dissension at the club and being more concerned with making money than winning football matches. His comments saw him briefly banished from the club until he came to apologise to the president David Smorgon later in the year.

== Family ==
Liberatore married his wife Jane, a schoolteacher, in 1991. Together, they had two sons, Tom and Oliver Liberatore, and a daughter named Meg. News of a divorce between Liberatore and his wife became public in April 2008 when Jane demanded the sale of Liberatore's medals during the legal proceedings, with the intention of using the money to create a trust fund for their children's education.

Liberatore was present at the 2016 AFL Grand Final with his daughter and his mother, and was seen celebrating the Bulldogs' victory with his son Tom after the game.

== Holden ==
Liberatore also worked for Holden, and was interviewed in 2019 for the social history project about his time working for the company. The recording can be found at the National Library of Australia.

== Footnotes ==
1. The true number of tackles is likely slightly higher than 1225, as tackle statistics were not recorded during 1986, in which Liberatore played the first four of his 283 games.
