= Trading post =

Area where economic activity between peoples is less regulated

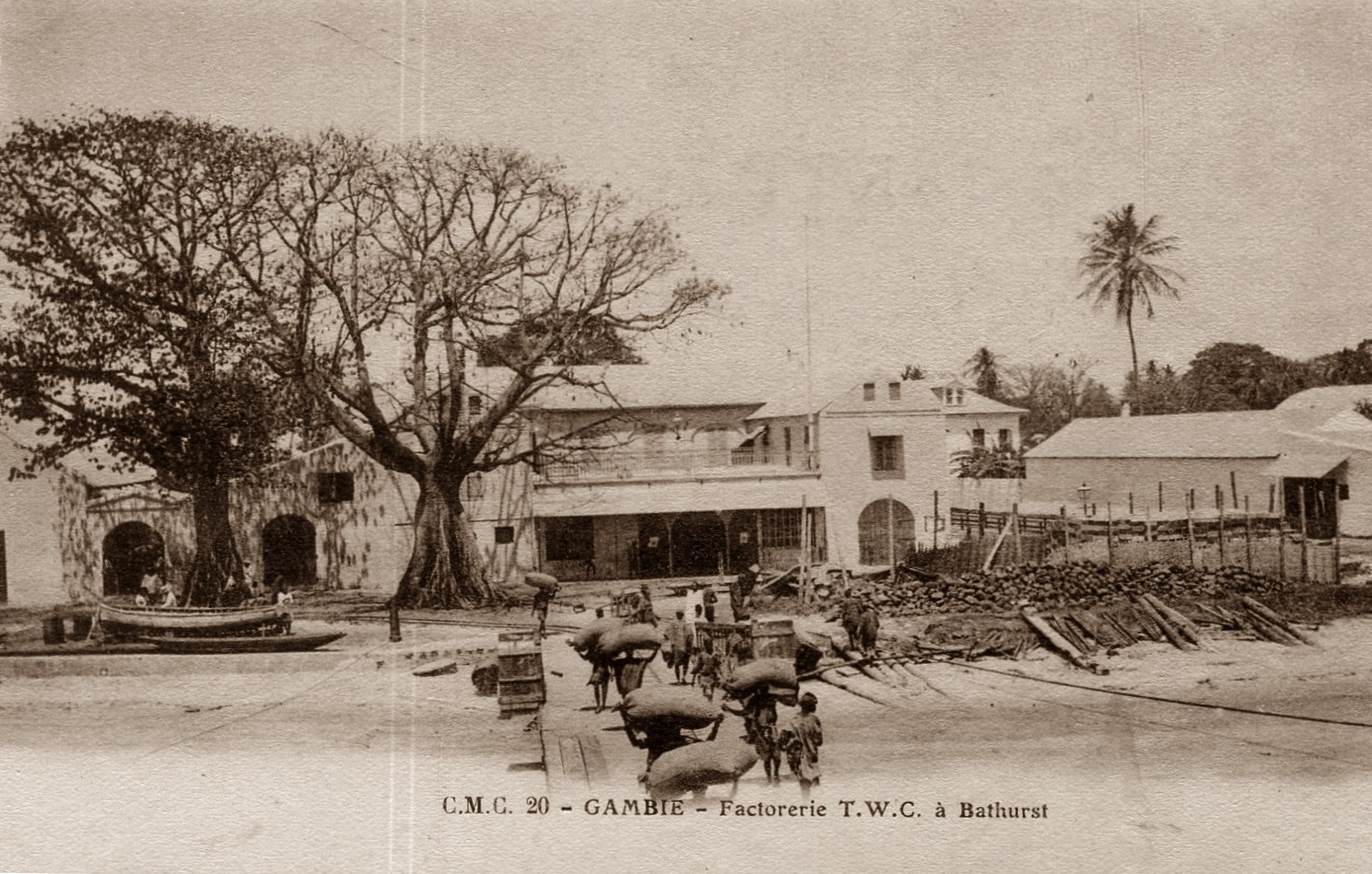
A factory at Bathurst (Gambia) around 1900

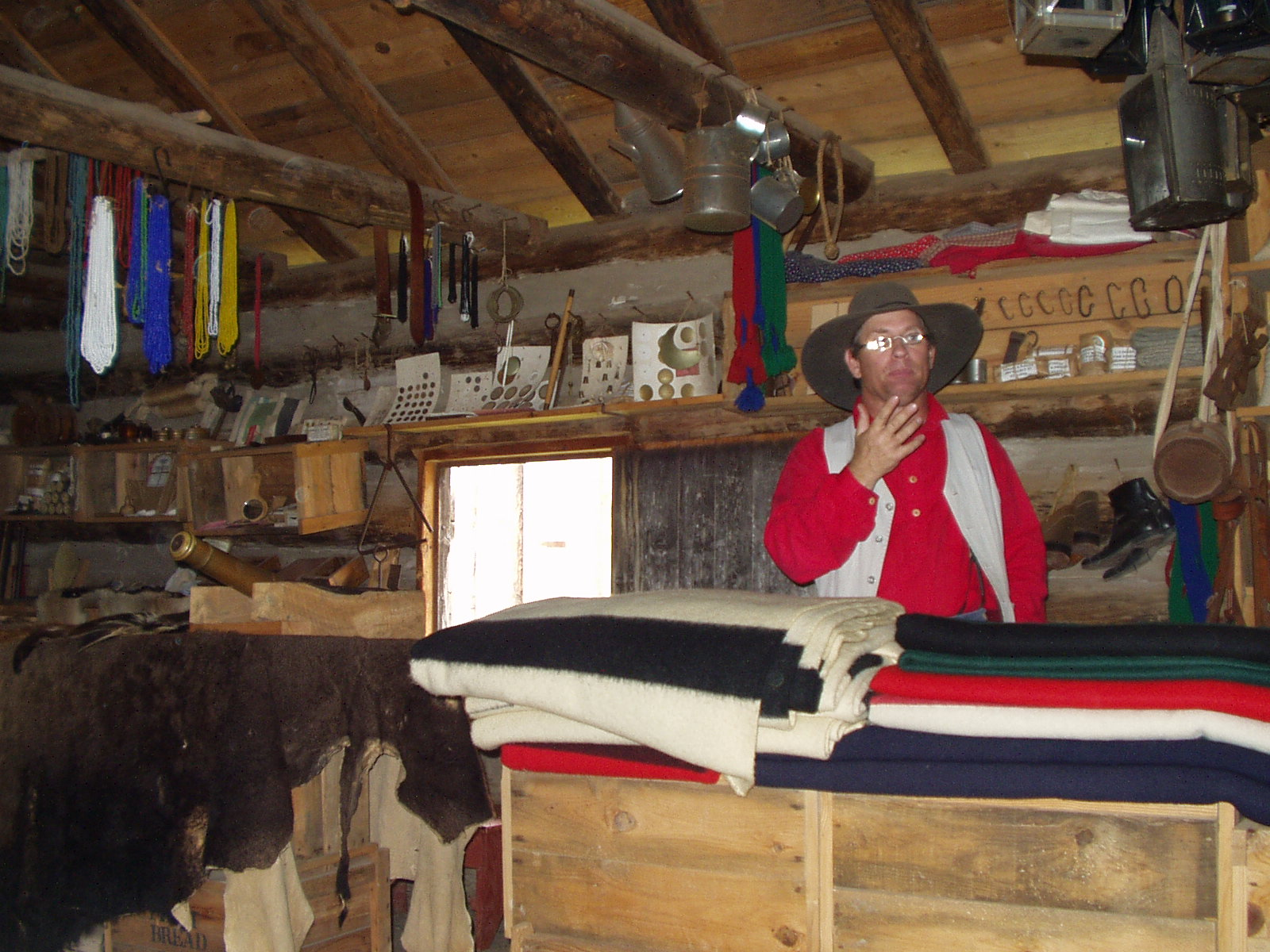
A recreation of a typical trading post for trade between American pioneers and Plains Indians

A trading post, trading station, or trading house, also known as a factory in European and colonial contexts, is an establishment or settlement where goods and services could be traded.

Typically a trading post allows people from one geographic area to exchange for goods produced in another area. Usually money is not used. The barter that occurs often includes an aspect of haggling. In some examples, local inhabitants can use a trading post to exchange what they have (such as locally-harvested furs) for goods they wish to acquire (such as manufactured trade goods imported from industrialized places).

Given the expense incurred by transportation, exchanges made at a trading post can involve items which either party or both parties regard as luxury goods, especially lightweight high-priced items or goods that one side values more than the other due to local availability. Beaver pelts were commonly available in the old West where they had about the same utility as other animal skins, but in England they were specifically prized and uniquely useful for the hat-making industry.

A trading post can consist either of a single building or of an entire town. Trading posts have been established in a range of areas, including relatively remote ones, but most often near an ocean, a river, or another source of a natural resource. A prominent geographical location and the head start provided by an early trading post ensured that trading posts feature in the history of many of today's cities.

== Examples ==
Timbuktu

Hong Kong

Various emporia — especially Greek or Phoenician — in classical antiquity.

Major towns in the Hanseatic League, known as kontors, a form of trading posts.

Charax Spasinu, a trading post between the Roman and Parthian Empires.

Multiple Portuguese, Dutch, Danish, French and English trading-posts ("factories") in the Indian Ocean, from east Africa to the East Indies, but especially on the coasts of India, established from very early in the 16th century onwards.

Manhattan and Singapore were both established as trading posts, by Dutchman Peter Minuit in 1626 and by Englishman Stamford Raffles in 1819 respectively; each later developed into major settlements.

The City of Edmonton, Alberta began as Fort Edmonton in 1812.

The Roman Empire imposed control over a large area due to its efficient systems for transferring information, goods, and military expeditions across large distances. The transportation of goods specifically were vital to maintaining outposts in territories distant from Rome, such as northern Africa and western Asia. Trading posts helped move these goods and decide where they were going and when. Trading posts and other parts of the Roman trade system collected a range of goods included precious stones, fabrics, ivory, and wine.

There is also evidence that cattle were traded at the Empúries trading post, established by Greeks in the 6th century BCE on the Iberian Peninsula.

== North American frontier ==
Trading houses were typically strategically located and stocked with goods that Native Americans and other trappers would trade furs for. These goods included clothing, blankets, axes, beads, corn, wheat flour, and liquor. Eric Jay Dolin's Fur, Fortune, and Empire provides a history of trading posts in North America.

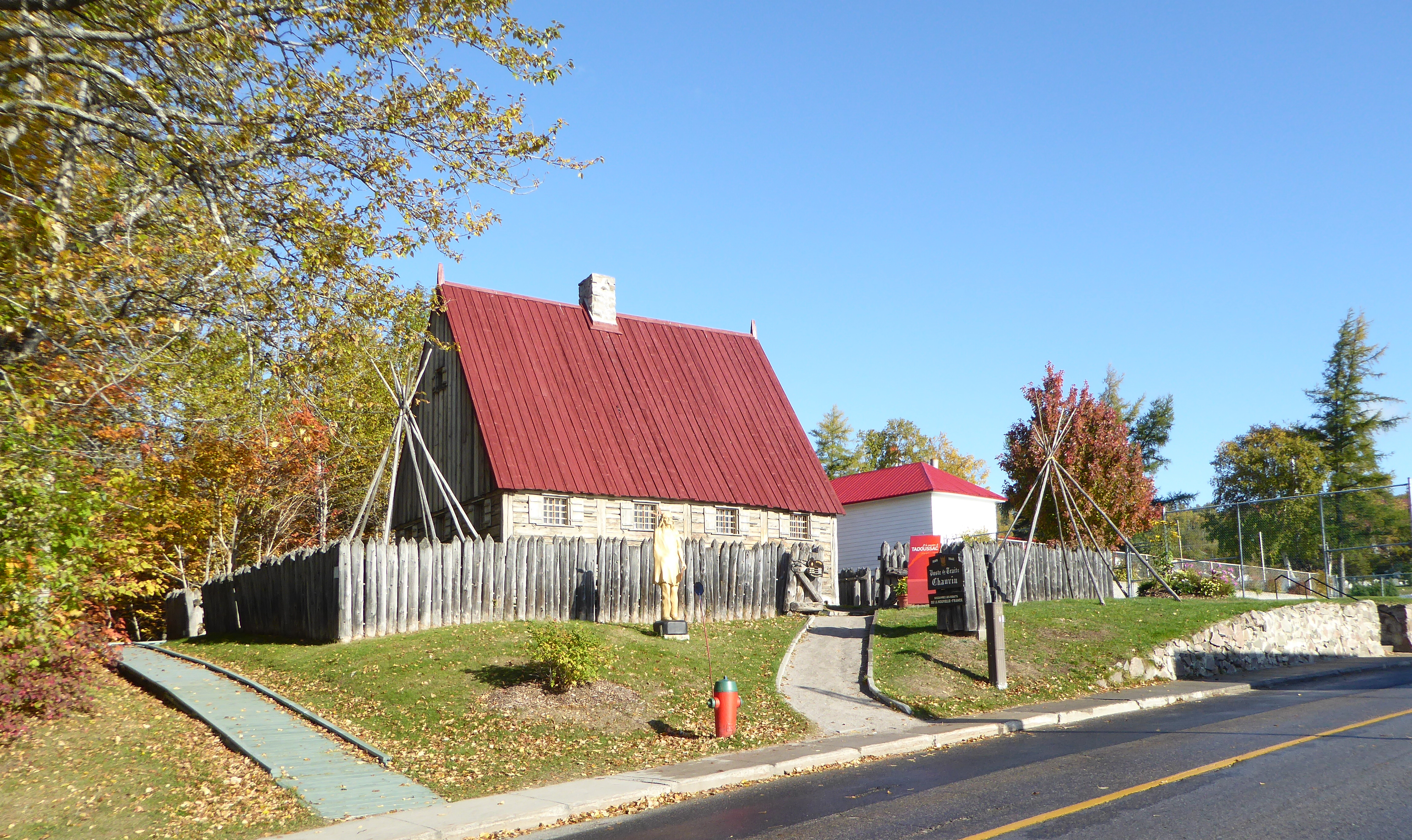
Tadoussac. Trading post Chauvin de Tonnetuit

Plymouth colonists established Kennebec Trading House in 1628. This was followed by the Plymouth Penobscot trading post. Conflicts between French and Plymouth colonists occurred in 1631 when Frenchmen arrived at the Plymouth Penobscot trading post. The masters of the trading post and most of the crew were absent, leaving only a few servants (employees) to attend to the Frenchmen. When the Frenchmen learned this was the case, they feigned interest in guns available at the trading post, which when they got their hands on them, they turned back onto the servants. They obtained all valuables, leaving with £500 of goods and £300 in beaver pelts.

John Jacob Astor founded the American Fur Company (AFC). One of the great feats achieved by the AFC was the establishment of a trading post in the native Blackfoot tribe's territory, located in modern-day Montana along the Rocky Mountains. The Blackfoot tribe had killed many Euro-Americans and, up to this point, had only traded with the Hudson Bay Company. In order to erect a trading post in Blackfoot territory, the AFC needed a way to establish contact on their behalf. Jacob Berger, a trapper, offered Kenneth McKenzie to serve as this contact and get the AFC into negotiations with the Blackfoot. The talks were successful, and McKenzie was allowed to build a trading post in Blackfoot territory, adjacent to the Missouri and Marias Rivers, naming it Fort McKenzie.

The American post, Noochuloghoyet Trading Post, was established in the last 19th century in central Alaska adjacent to the Yukon River. This was an important trading post for the fur trade. It operated under different names, and its level of business activity varied greatly while it was in operation.

== Other uses ==
- In the context of scouting, trading post usually refers to a camp store in which snacks, craft materials, and general merchandise are sold. "Trading posts" also refers to a cub scout activity in which cub teams (or individuals) undertake challenge activities in exchange for points.
- A "trading post" also once referred to a trading booth within the New York Stock Exchange.

== Trading posts in North America ==
- List of Hudson's Bay Company trading posts
- Fort Vancouver
- Fort Edmonton
- Fort Union Trading Post National Historic Site
- Fort Michilimackinac
- Fort Umpqua
- Fort William, Ontario
- Tadoussac

== See also ==
- Commerce
- Entrepôt
- Factory (trading post)
- Fur trade
- Karum (trade post)
- Navajo trading posts
- Panton, Leslie & Company
- Trading Post (newspaper)
- United States Government Fur Trade Factory System
