= Italian Team of the Century =

The Victorian Football League-Australian Football League (VFL/AFL) Italian Team of the Century was announced in June 2007. It recognises the role of Italian Australian players in the sport.

Players and/or at least one of the player's parents or grandparents had to have been born in Italy. They also had to have played at least one game at VFL/AFL level.

Anthony Koutoufides, who was also in the Greek Team of the Century qualified via his mother, whilst Ian Stewart's father was Italian, but he had always used his mother's maiden name. John Kennedy's maternal grandparents were Italian.

== The team ==
The final selected team was announced at the Palladium Room at the Crown Casino in Melbourne on 31 May 2007.

Italian Team of the Century
B:	Frank Curcio	Stephen Silvagni	Len Incigneri
HB:	Alec Epis	Anthony Koutoufides	John Kennedy Jr
C:	Robert DiPierdomenico	Ian Stewart	Peter Matera
HF:	Peter Riccardi	Alan Martello	Mark Mercuri
F:	Phillip Matera	Saverio Rocca	Brendan Fevola
Foll:	Steve Alessio	Mark Ricciuto (Captain)	Peter Pianto
Int:	Sergio Silvagni	Tony Liberatore	Scott Camporeale
Int:	Joe Misiti		
Coach:	Ron Barassi, Jr		

A team President was also named: Frank Costa.

== Selectors ==
Choosing the team from the shortlist were:

- Ron Barassi (chairman)
- Kevin Bartlett
- Frank Costa
- Brendon Gale
- Kevin Sheedy
- Bob Skilton
- Bill Stephen

== Shortlist ==
The panel's final selection was made from a shortlist of 50 (from an original list of 148). They were (listed alphabetically):

1. Steve Alessio
2. Mark Arceri
3. Ron Barassi, Sr. (deceased)
4. Peter Menaglio
5. John Benetti
6. Mario Bortolotto
7. Scott Camporeale
8. Domenic Cassisi
9. Vin Catoggio
10. Frank Curcio (deceased)
11. Nick Dal Santo
12. Ron De Iulio
13. Paul Dimattina
14. Robert DiPierdomenico
15. Alec Epis
16. Brendan Fevola
17. Silvio Foschini
18. Cyril Gambetta (deceased)
19. Daniel Giansiracusa
20. Len Incigneri (deceased)
21. Alan Johnson
22. John Kennedy Jr
23. Anthony Koutoufides
24. Andrew Leoncelli
25. Tony Liberatore
26. Paul Licuria
27. Stan Magro
28. Gary Malarkey
29. Al Mantello
30. Gerald Marchesi (deceased)
31. Alan Martello
32. Peter Matera
33. Phillip Matera
34. Mark Mercuri
35. Joe Misiti
36. Tony Ongarello
37. Peter Pianto
38. Tony Polinelli
39. Simon Prestigiacomo
40. Adam Ramanauskas
41. Peter Riccardi
42. Mark Ricciuto
43. Guy Rigoni
44. Anthony Rocca
45. Saverio Rocca
46. Peter Russo
47. Laurie Serafini
48. Sergio Silvagni
49. Stephen Silvagni
50. Ian Stewart

== See also ==
- Indigenous Team of the Century
- Greek Team of the Century
