= Paul Wynd =

Australian rules footballer

Personal information
- Born: 2 May 1976 (age 50)
- Original team: Jacana
- Height: 190 cm (6 ft 3 in)
- Weight: 76 kg (168 lb)

Playing career^{1}
Years	Club	Games (Goals)
1997	North Melbourne	3 (0)
- ^{1} Playing statistics correct to the end of 1997.

Paul Wynd (born 2 May 1976) is a former Australian rules football player. Wynd played three games for North Melbourne in the Australian Football League during the 1997 AFL season.

He is the brother of Scott Wynd and son of Garrey Wynd, both league footballers.
