= Ron De Iulio =

Australian rules footballer

Personal information
- Full name: Ron De Iulio
- Born: 15 April 1972 (age 54)
- Original team: North Melbourne
- Height: 180 cm (5 ft 11 in)
- Weight: 82 kg (181 lb)

Playing career^{1}
Years	Club	Games (Goals)
1992–1999	Carlton	104 (71)
- ^{1} Playing statistics correct to the end of 1999.

Career highlights
- Fothergill–Round–Mitchell Medal: 1991

Ron De Iulio (born 15 April 1972) is a former Australian rules footballer who played with Carlton in the Australian Football League (AFL) during the 1990s.

A late comer to Australian rules football, De Iulio only switched from soccer at the age of 16. He played for both Brunswick and Box Hill in the VFA, winning the Fothergill–Round Medal in 1991, before being drafted by North Melbourne. Before he played a senior game he was traded to Carlton and made his AFL debut in 1992.

He kicked 29 goals as a forward pocket and half forward in his debut season to finish second behind Stephen Kernahan in the club's goal-kicking. This tally included a bag of five goals in a win over North Melbourne at the MCG. After a poor finals series in 1993, De Iulio managed just nine games over the next two seasons.

In 1996, De Iulio established a place in the team as a defender and put together 21 games. Such was his inconsistency that while he struggled in 1997, he didn't miss game in 1998 and then retiring at the end of 2000.

Carlton played in three grand finals during De Iulio's time at the club, however he was not selected to play in any of them.

Both of his parents were born in Italy and he was shortlisted VFL/AFL Italian Team of the Century.

In April 2022 De Iulio was convicted of possession of methamphetamine and the proceeds of crime, and was sentenced to a six month diversion program. He did not appear in person in court as he had a stroke in October 2021 and was in hospital being treated for a serious infection in his leg.

De Iulio pleaded guilty to further drug trafficking charges in 2023 and was given a fine and a good behaviour bond.
