= Garrey Wynd =

Australian rules footballer

Personal information
- Full name: Garrey Wynd
- Born: 31 October 1946 (age 80)
- Original team: Camperdown
- Height: 177 cm (5 ft 10 in)
- Weight: 72 kg (159 lb)
- Position: Centre

Playing career^{1}
Years	Club	Games (Goals)
1966	Melbourne	2 (1)
- ^{1} Playing statistics correct to the end of 1966.

Garrey Wynd (born 31 October 1946) is a former Australian rules footballer who played with Melbourne in the Victorian Football League (VFL).

Wynd, a centreman, was recruited from Camperdown. He made just two appearances for Melbourne, in the 1966 VFL season, against Collingwood at Victoria Park and Footscray at Western Oval.

He then went on to play with Prahran in the Victorian Football Association.

Two sons, Paul and Scott, played in the Australian Football League, the latter a Brownlow Medallist.
