= 1979 Brownlow Medal =

- Date: 24 September
- Location: Southern Cross Ballroom
- Winner: Peter Moore (Collingwood); 22 votes

Television/radio coverage
- Network: Seven Network

The 1979 Brownlow Medal was the 52nd year the award was presented to the player adjudged the fairest and best player during the Victorian Football League (VFL) home and away season. Peter Moore of the Collingwood Football Club won the medal by polling twenty-two votes during the 1979 VFL season.

== Leading votegetters ==
	Player	Votes
1st	Peter Moore (Collingwood)	22
2nd	Garry Wilson (Fitzroy)	21
3rd	Robert Flower (Melbourne)	19
4th	Barry Round (Sydney)	17
5th	Gary Dempsey (North Melbourne)	16
6th	Ross Glendinning (North Melbourne)	14
=7th	Terry Daniher (Essendon)	13
=7th	Mark Maclure (Carlton)	13
=7th	Robbert Klomp (Carlton)	13
=7th	Jeff Dunne (St Kilda)	13
	Rene Kink* (Collingwood)	13

* The player was ineligible to win the medal due to suspension by the AFL Tribunal during the year.
