= Alan Martello =

Australian rules footballer (born 1952)

Personal information
- Born: 14 September 1952 (age 74)
- Original team: St Mary's Church of England
- Height: 193 cm (6 ft 4 in)
- Weight: 100 kg (220 lb)

Playing career^{1}
Years	Club	Games (Goals)
1970–1980	Hawthorn	223 (164)
1981–1983	Richmond	32 (3)
Total		255 (167)
- ^{1} Playing statistics correct to the end of 1983.

Career highlights
- 3× VFL Premiership player: 1971, 1976, 1978; VFL/AFL Italian Team of the Century

Alan Martello (born 14 September 1952) is a former Australian rules footballer who played for the Hawthorn Football Club and Richmond Football Club in the Victorian Football League (VFL).

Martello was Hawthorn's regular centre half-forward for much of the 1970s and a prodigious kicker of the football, Martello was the youngest man ever to reach 200 games. Martello left Hawthorn in 1980 after a bitter dispute and played in a losing Grand Final for Richmond in 1982.

Following his playing career he had a long broadcasting career with 3AW as a commentator on the station's AFL coverage.

== Honours and achievements ==
Hawthorn

- 3× VFL premiership player: 1971, 1976, 1978
- 2× Minor premiership: 1971, 1975

Richmond

- Minor premiership: 1982

Individual

- Hawthorn life member
- VFL/AFL Italian Team of the Century

== Bibliography ==
- Hogan P: The Tigers of Old, Richmond FC, Melbourne 1996
