= Frank Curcio =

Australian rules footballer and coach

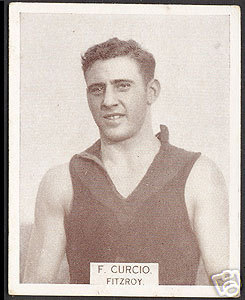

Personal information
- Born: 25 November 1912; Melbourne, Victoria
- Died: 11 November 1988 (aged 75)
- Original team: Christian Young Men's Society
- Height: 185 cm (6 ft 1 in)
- Weight: 86 kg (190 lb)

Playing career^{1}
Years	Club	Games (Goals)
1932–1948	Fitzroy	249 (17)

Coaching career
Years	Club	Games (W–L–D)
1956	Fitzroy	1 (0–1–0)
- ^{1} Playing statistics correct to the end of 1948.

Career highlights
- Fitzroy Captain 1938, 1939, 1940, 1941.; Fitzroy Team of the Century; VFL/AFL Italian Team of the Century (2007); VFL interstate representative (3 games)

Francis Eduardo Curcio (25 November 1912 – 11 November 1988) was an Australian rules footballer who played his entire 249 game career for the Fitzroy Lions in the Victorian Football League (VFL). He captained the club for four seasons, from 1938 until 1941.

== Playing career ==
Recruited from the Christian Young Men's Society in 1931, Curcio was a tough, hard ruckman, who also played well in the back line. He was renowned for protecting his smaller teammates. A bass violinist, Curcio combined his musical talents with his football prowess, but stood out of the game in 1937 to concentrate on his music. Ever conscious of safeguarding his hands to work the strings of the bass violin, he once told North Melbourne's Fred Fairweather, Hit me as hard as you like, but don't hurt my fingers.

World War II military service cost Curcio a place in Fitzroy's 1944 premiership team and three broken fingers sustained in a services match in 1945, effectively ended his musical career.

Curcio played his best football in an era when Fitzroy's best and fairest records were either lost on not kept, arguably robbing him of an opportunity to be recorded and remembered as a great player in the record books. On 27 April 1946, Curcio became the first Fitzroy player to play 200 league games.

Curcio retired in 1948, after 15 seasons and having played 249 VFL games, all with Fitzroy, collecting 27 Brownlow Medal votes. Curcio's club games record stood for 23 years at Fitzroy until surpassed by Kevin Murray. He also held the record for most VFL/AFL matches played in the number 18 guernsey with 249 until Essendon's Matthew Lloyd surpassed that figure in 2008. With the club now defunct, he sits in fourth position in the record books for most games played for Fitzroy.

== Career highlights ==
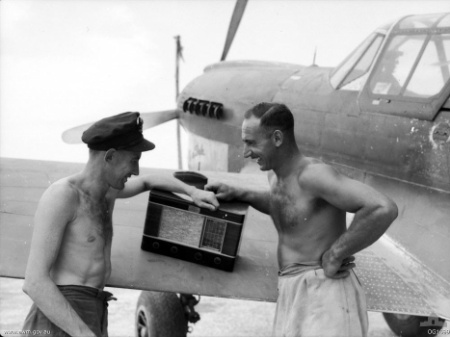
Frank Curcio (right) listening to the 1944 VFL Grand Final while stationed at Dutch New Guinea, with former Collingwood player, Ron McCann.

After Fitzroy and Brisbane combined their respective histories in 2001, the club unveiled a new 200 game honour board at the Gabba which included Fitzroy, Brisbane, and Brisbane Lion players. The board was hung in the players' rooms with a replica for the members' area. The board itself was christened the 'Curcio-McIvor' board, in honour of past players Frank Curcio and Scott McIvor.

Curcio was the first VFL player of Italian background to really emerge as a great footballer. In 2007, Curcio was named in the VFL/AFL Italian Team of the Century, in the back line. Also in 2007, the Lions recognised Curcio as one of the best 10 players from the era 1927 to 1956. He represented Victoria on 3 occasions. Curcio died on 11 November 1988, 14 days short of his 76th birthday.

On 3 May 2001, Curcio was named in Fitzroy's Team of the Century, in the back pocket position.

== See also ==
- Australian rules footballers with 200 games for one club
- Fitzroy FC honour roll
- List of Fitzroy Football Club coaches
