= 1994 Brownlow Medal =

- Winner: Greg Williams (Carlton); 30 votes

Television/radio coverage
- Network: Seven Network

The 1994 Brownlow Medal was the 67th year the award was presented to the player adjudged the fairest and best player during the Australian Football League (AFL) home-and-away season. Greg Williams of the Carlton Football Club won the medal by polling thirty votes during the 1994 AFL season.

== Leading vote-getters ==
	Player	Votes
1st	Greg Williams (Carlton)	30
2nd	Peter Matera (West Coast)	28
3rd	Garry Hocking (Geelong)	20
4th	Wayne Schwass (North Melbourne)	19
5th	Damian Monkhorst (Collingwood)	17
6th	Tony Liberatore (Footscray)	16
=7th	David Schwarz (Melbourne)	15
=7th	Chris Grant (Footscray)	15
	Wayne Carey (North Melbourne)*	15
9th	John Platten (Hawthorn)	14
=10th	Leon Cameron (Footscray)	13
=10th	Shaun Rehn (Adelaide)	13

* The player was ineligible to win the medal due to suspension by the AFL Tribunal during the year.
