= Frank Carbone (footballer) =

Australian rules footballer

Personal information
- Born: 4 April 1965 (age 61)
- Original team: CBC St Kilda
- Height: 178 cm (5 ft 10 in)
- Weight: 76 kg (168 lb)

Playing career^{1}
Years	Club	Games (Goals)
1985–1987	St Kilda	10 (8)
- ^{1} Playing statistics correct to the end of 1987.

Frank Carbone (born 4 April 1965) is a former Australian rules footballer who played with St Kilda in the Victorian Football League (VFL).

Carbone, who is of Italian descent, played for CBC St Kilda originally and represented St Kilda Under-19s, before he made his VFL debut in 1985. He appeared in the opening seven rounds of the 1985 season, but played only once more that year, in round 12. His first three league games were losses by over 100 points. He didn't feature at all in the 1986 season, then played two games in 1987.
