= Dwayne Russell =

Australian rules footballer

Personal information
- Full name: Dwayne John Russell
- Born: 4 March 1965 (age 61); Adelaide, South Australia
- Height: 1.88 m (6 ft 2 in)
- Weight: 88 kg (194 lb)

Playing career^{1}
Years	Club	Games (Goals)
1981–1986	Port Adelaide (SANFL)	71 (133)
1987–1991	Geelong (VFL/AFL)	50 (51)

Representative team honours
Years	Team	Games (Goals)
1984	South Australia	2
- ^{1} Playing statistics correct to the end of 1991.

Shane John Russell (born 4 March 1965) known as Dwayne Russell is a retired professional Australian rules footballer, sports commentator and author.

== Early life and football career ==
Born in Adelaide, Russell played his junior football at Pooraka Football Club. He made his senior football debut as a sixteen-year-old in 1981 for Port Adelaide Football Club in the South Australian National Football League (SANFL), eventually becoming Port Adelaide's vice-captain, before crossing over to Victorian Football League (VFL) club Geelong in 1987. Russell played 50 games, kicking 51 goals for Geelong until he left the club at the end of the 1991 AFL season.

Russell initially considered returning to Port Adelaide to finish his career but instead coached in country Victoria for a few years before retiring from football.

== Sports journalism ==
Russell unsuccessfully applied for a journalism cadetship in Adelaide in 1984 before starting a journalism career in Geelong in 1989. Russell became a full-time sports journalist with The Age in 1997. Covering the major sporting events of Melbourne, Russell built up a serviceable record as the number-four sports writer at The Age. Following this success, he was moved full-time to the paper's coverage of the AFL in 1999, including a stint as the writer for The Sunday Age Sport section in the mid-2000s.

He also joined 95.5 K-Rock in Geelong as Sports Presenter in their news updates in the "Big Mattress" breakfast show. Soon, he also co-hosted a sport/comedy segment called "On The Bench" with ex-Geelong player Billy Brownless and the Essendon fanatic "Ferret" (Russell Taylor), twice a week. A long list of Geelong players were included in "On The Bench" as special guests, including Barry Stoneham, Tim McGrath and Paul Couch.

== Football commentary ==
In 2002, Channel Nine gave Russell the main caller's role for Sunday afternoon AFL matches before being promoted to the network's calling team for Friday night matches in 2006.

His other main occupation this time was as co-host of radio station 3AW's top-rating drive-time sports show, Sports Today with Gerard Healy, a role he departed in late 2019.

After leaving the Nine Network, Russell received a contract with Fox Sports to call two weekly AFL matches for the Pay-TV provider for the 2007 AFL season and beyond, under the new AFL TV Rights Deal, of which Fox Sports covered four games weekly during the home-and-away season. In 2012, Russell moved to the newly relaunched Fox Footy, which showed every game.

In 2012, Russell joined the Friday night 3AW football team while continuing to host Sports Today for the station.

In 2019, Russell left 3AW to join SEN as host of its afternoon program and a football caller.

== Commentary in other sports ==
Russell expanded his work with Fox Sports by becoming a basketball commentator in Fox's coverage of the 2009/10 National Basketball League (NBL) season. Additionally, he also provided commentary on Fox's coverage of the 2011 Australian Open tennis tournament.

Since 2022, Russell has also commentated Test cricket for SEN radio.

== Writing ==
In 2025 Russell's debut novel titled Killing for Sport was published by Affirm Press. The novel is unrelated to Russell's sporting background and is a crime and mystery thriller concerning a duplicitous spouse and the international art world.
