= 1986 Brownlow Medal =

- Winners: Robert DiPierdomenico (Hawthorn); Greg Williams (Sydney); 17 votes

Television/radio coverage
- Network: Seven Network

The 1986 Brownlow Medal was the 59th year the award was presented to the player adjudged the fairest and best player during the Victorian Football League (VFL) home and away season. Robert DiPierdomenico of the Hawthorn Football Club and Greg Williams of the Sydney Swans both won the medal by polling seventeen votes during the 1986 VFL season.

The winning tally of 17 votes, at only 0.77 votes per game played, both set new records for the lowest in Brownlow Medal history under the 3-2-1 voting system; as of 2024, these records have not been surpassed.

== Leading votegetters ==
| | Player | Votes |
|---|---|---|
| =1st | Robert DiPierdomenico (Hawthorn) | 17 |
| =1st | Greg Williams (Sydney) | 17 |
| 3rd | Paul Roos (Fitzroy) | 16 |
| 4th | Glenn Hawker (Essendon) | 15 |
| 5th | John Platten (Hawthorn) | 14 |
| 6th | Bruce Abernethy (Collingwood) | 13 |
| =7th | Shane Morwood (Collingwood) | 12 |
| =7th | Wayne Harmes (Carlton) | 12 |
| | Jon Dorotich (Carlton)* | 12 |
| 9th | Richard Loveridge (Hawthorn) | 11 |
| =10th | Peter McConville (Carlton) | 10 |
| =10th | Alan Ezard (Essendon) | 10 |
| =10th | Paul Meldrum (Carlton) | 10 |
| =10th | Peter Daicos (Collingwood) | 10 |
| =10th | Dennis Carroll (Sydney) | 10 |
| =10th | Mark Dwyer (Fitzroy) | 10 |

* The player was ineligible to win the medal due to suspension by the VFL Tribunal during the year.
