= 1984 Brownlow Medal =

- Winner: Peter Moore (Melbourne); 24 votes

Television/radio coverage
- Network: Seven Network

The 1984 Brownlow Medal was the 57th year the award was presented to the player adjudged the fairest and best player during the Victorian Football League (VFL) home and away season. Peter Moore of the Melbourne Football Club won the medal by polling twenty-four votes during the 1984 VFL season.

== Leading votegetters ==
	Player	Votes
1st	Peter Moore (Melbourne)	24
2nd	David Cloke (Collingwood)	21
3rd	Robert Flower (Melbourne)	19
4th	Steven Taubert (Sydney)	15
=5th	Doug Hawkins (Footscray)	14
=5th	Michael Byrne (Hawthorn)	14
=5th	Simon Madden (Essendon)	14
=8th	Jim Buckley (Carlton)	12
=8th	Wayne Johnston (Carlton)	12
=8th	Allan Sidebottom (St Kilda)	12
=8th	Roger Merrett (Essendon)	12
=8th	Robert DiPierdomenico (Hawthorn)	12
=8th	Mark Lee (Richmond)	12
=8th	Maurice Rioli (Richmond)	12
	Gary Ayres (Hawthorn)*	12

* The player was ineligible to win the medal due to suspension by the VFL Tribunal during the year.
