= 1992 Brownlow Medal =

- Location: Southern Cross Ballroom
- Hosted by: Bruce McAvaney
- Winner: Scott Wynd (Footscray); 20 votes

Television/radio coverage
- Network: Seven Network

The 1992 Brownlow Medal was the 65th year the award was presented to the player adjudged the fairest and best player during the Australian Football League (AFL) home and away season. Scott Wynd of the Footscray Football Club was the outright winner of the medal count, becoming the ninth individual to win the award while playing for Footscray.

== Leading votegetters ==
	Player	Votes
1st	Scott Wynd (Footscray)	20
2nd	Jason Dunstall (Hawthorn)	18
3rd	Ken Hinkley (Geelong)	17
4th	Stewart Loewe (St Kilda)	16
5th	Darren Jarman (Hawthorn)	14
	Wayne Carey (North Melbourne)*	14
6th	Derek Kickett (Essendon)	13
=7th	Jon Dorotich (Carlton)	12
=7th	Robert Harvey (St Kilda)	12
=7th	Nigel Kellett (Footscray)	12
=7th	Shaun Rehn (Adelaide)	12
=7th	Tony Liberatore (Footscray)	12

* The player was ineligible to win the medal due to suspension by the AFL Tribunal during the year.
