= 1990 Brownlow Medal =

- Date: 24 September 1990
- Location: Southern Cross Ballroom
- Hosted by: Bruce McAvaney
- Winner: Tony Liberatore (Footscray); 18 votes

Television/radio coverage
- Network: Seven Network

The 1990 Brownlow Medal was the 63rd year the award was presented to the player adjudged the fairest and best player during the Australian Football League (AFL) home and away season. Tony Liberatore of the Footscray Football Club won the medal by polling eighteen votes during the 1990 AFL season.

The count took place on 24 September, the Monday evening prior to the originally scheduled grand final date; it was not rescheduled when the drawn qualifying final and subsequent replay caused the grand final to be deferred by a week.

== The count ==
It was an emotional occasion for Liberatore, whose triumph capped off a great year for the Footscray Football Club, which barely 11 months prior had survived an attempted merger with Fitzroy. Aged 24, the 163cm rover had struggled to break into Footscray's senior team over previous seasons, having played only eighteen career senior games including only two in the past two years; he started the year unsure of his place after being overlooked for a pre-season game and contemplated nominating for the AFL draft.

After earning best-on-ground votes from the umpires in the Round 5 and 6 wins over Carlton and Fitzroy respectively, Liberatore led the medal count and managed to hold it for the remainder of the evening. He was forced to endured a wait, as he missed the final three games of the season due to a knee injury suffered in round 19. Collingwood winger and runner-up in the count Graham Wright finished strongly with two best-on-ground votes in rounds 21 and 22, but fell one vote short of tying for the award, while third-placed Carlton full-back Stephen Silvagni, two votes behind Liberatore at the end of round 19, did not gain any further votes in the final three rounds. Liberatore thus became the first VFL/AFL footballer to have won the League best and fairest award at three levels, having previously won the Morrish Medal (for the Under 19s competition) in 1984 and the Gardiner Medal twice (for the Reserves competition) in 1986 and 1988.

Upon accepting the award, Liberatore thanked the club president, Peter Gordon, for saving the club, coach Terry Wheeler for the opportunity to play and for believing in him, and thanked his parents and fiancée. He also spoke of how persistence and being given a chance had helped him cement his place in the team:

I always believed that anything you do in life, you persevere and give it all you got. ... Through the love of Footscray, I decided I would stick at it. ... It goes to show that playing at that level, sometimes when the young players get an opportunity, they really play well and that's what happened to me.

== Top 10 votegetters ==
- If a number is vacant, it indicates that the player missed that particular game.
- Numbers highlighted in blue indicates the player led/were equal leader in the Brownlow Medal count at the end of that round.
- Players with asterisks next to names indicates ineligibility to win the award due to suspension from the Tribunal.

| | Player | 1 | 2 | 3 | 4 | 5 | 6 | 7 | 8 | 9 | 10 | 11 | 12 | 13 | 14 | 15 | 16 | 17 | 18 | 19 | 20 | 21 | 22 | Total |
|---|---|---|---|---|---|---|---|---|---|---|---|---|---|---|---|---|---|---|---|---|---|---|---|---|
| 1 | Tony Liberatore (Footscray) | 0 | 2 | 0 | 0 | 3 | 3 | 2 | 1 | 2 | 0 | 0 | 0 | 0 | 3 | 0 | 0 | 0 | 1 | 1 | | | | 18 |
| 2 | Graham Wright (Collingwood) | 0 | 0 | 3 | 0 | 3 | 0 | 2 | 0 | 0 | 0 | 0 | 0 | 0 | 0 | 2 | 0 | 1 | 0 | 0 | 0 | 3 | 3 | 17 |
| 3 | Stephen Silvagni (Carlton) | 0 | 0 | 3 | 0 | 0 | 0 | 3 | 0 | 0 | 0 | 0 | 0 | 0 | 0 | 0 | 3 | 2 | 3 | 2 | 0 | 0 | 0 | 16 |
| =4 | Andrew Collins (Hawthorn) | 0 | 0 | 0 | 3 | 0 | 0 | 0 | 0 | 3 | 0 | 0 | 2 | 0 | 2 | 0 | 0 | 2 | 0 | 0 | 0 | 3 | 0 | 15 |
| =4 | David Bain (Brisbane Bears) | 0 | 0 | 2 | 0 | 0 | 0 | 0 | 3 | 0 | 2 | 2 | 0 | 0 | 0 | 3 | 0 | 1 | 0 | 1 | 0 | 1 | 0 | 15 |
| =4 | Brett Lovett (Melbourne) | 0 | 2 | 0 | 0 | 2 | 0 | 1 | 2 | 1 | 0 | 1 | 0 | 0 | 0 | 0 | 0 | 3 | 0 | 0 | 3 | 0 | 0 | 15 |
| 7 | Tony McGuinness (Footscray) | 0 | 3 | 0 | 0 | 0 | 0 | 0 | 0 | 3 | 0 | 1 | 0 | 2 | 1 | 0 | 0 | 3 | 0 | 0 | 1 | 0 | 0 | 14 |
| =8 | Tony Shaw (Collingwood) | 0 | 0 | 0 | 0 | 0 | 0 | 0 | 3 | 0 | 0 | 3 | 3 | 0 | 3 | 0 | 0 | 0 | 0 | 0 | 0 | 1 | 0 | 13 |
| =8 | Greg Anderson (Essendon) | 3 | 2 | 0 | 0 | | | 0 | 0 | 0 | 0 | 0 | 0 | 0 | 0 | 3 | 0 | 2 | 0 | 0 | 0 | 0 | 3 | 13 |
| =8 | Darren Bewick (Essendon) | 0 | 0 | 0 | 0 | 0 | 0 | 0 | 0 | 0 | 0 | 0 | 2 | 0 | 3 | 0 | 0 | 1 | 0 | 2 | 3 | 0 | 2 | 13 |

== Leading votegetters by club ==
| Club | Player(s) | Votes |
|---|---|---|
| Brisbane Bears | David Bain | 15 |
| Carlton | Stephen Silvagni | 16 |
| Collingwood | Graham Wright | 17 |
| Essendon | Greg Anderson; Darren Bewick | 13 |
| Fitzroy | Ross Lyon; Brett Stephens | 8 |
| Footscray | Tony Liberatore | 18 |
| Geelong | Bill Brownless | 12 |
| Hawthorn | Andrew Collins | 15 |
| Melbourne | Brett Lovett | 15 |
| North Melbourne | John Longmire; Matthew Larkin | 9 |
| Richmond | Trent Nichols | 10 |
| St Kilda | Stewart Loewe | 12 |
| Sydney | Gareth John; Greg Williams | 7 |
| West Coast | Stephen Malaxos | 11 |
