= 1988 Brownlow Medal =

- Winner: Gerard Healy (Sydney); 20 votes

Television/radio coverage
- Network: Seven Network

The 1988 Brownlow Medal was the 61st year the award was presented to the player adjudged the fairest and best player during the Victorian Football League (VFL) home and away season. Gerard Healy of the Sydney Swans won the medal by polling twenty votes during the 1988 VFL season.

== Leading votegetters ==
	Player	Votes
1st	Gerard Healy (Sydney)	20
=2nd	Simon Madden (Essendon)	16
=2nd	Jason Dunstall (Hawthorn)	16
4th	Tony Hall (Hawthorn)	15
=5th	Darren Millane (Collingwood)	14
=5th	Darren Kappler (Fitzroy)	14
	Peter Foster (Footscray)*	14
=7th	Adrian Gleeson (Carlton)	13
=7th	Chris Mainwaring (West Coast)	13
=7th	Shane Morwood (Collingwood)	13
=7th	Tony McGuinness (Footscray)	13

* The player was ineligible to win the medal due to suspension by the VFL Tribunal during the year.
