= Essendon Football Club supplements saga =

2010s sports controversy

- Date: August 2011 – November 2016
- Also known as: Essendon doping scandal
- Type: Doping in sport
- Cause: Subcutaneous injections of: AOD-9604; Colostrum; Tribulus; Thymosin beta-4
- Participants: Essendon Football Club; Stephen Dank
- Outcome: Essendon fined $2 million; Essendon revoked the opportunity to play in the 2013 finals series; James Hird and Danny Corcoran suspended for 12 months; 34 players suspended for two years after they were found guilty in the Court of Arbitration for Sport for the 2012 use of Thymosin beta-4, a banned substance; Life AFL association ban for Stephen Dank
- Inquiries: Australian Crime Commission investigation, 2013; ASADA and AFL joint investigation, 2013; WorkSafe Victoria investigation, 2015
- Charges: Essendon Football Club (A$2 Million)

The Essendon Football Club supplements saga was a sports drug doping controversy that occurred during the early- and mid-2010s. It centred around the Essendon Football Club, nicknamed the Bombers, a professional Australian rules football club based in Melbourne and playing in the Australian Football League (AFL). The club was investigated starting in February 2013 by the Australian Sports Anti-Doping Authority (ASADA) and the World Anti-Doping Agency (WADA) over the legality of its supplements program during the 2012 AFL season and the preceding preseason. After four years of investigations and legal proceedings, thirty-four players at the club were found guilty of having used the banned peptide Thymosin beta-4 and incurred suspensions.

The initial stages of the investigation in 2013 made no findings regarding the legality of the supplements program. Still, they highlighted a wide range of governance and duty-of-care failures relating to the program. In August 2013, the AFL fined Essendon $2 million, barred the club from the 2013 finals series, and suspended senior coach James Hird and general manager Danny Corcoran as a result of these findings.

The second phase of the investigation resulted in thirty-four players being issued show cause notices by ASADA and infraction notices by the AFL in 2014, alleging the use of Thymosin beta-4 during the 2012 season. After facing an AFL Tribunal hearing in the 2014/15 offseason, the players were initially found not guilty. The decision was then appealed by WADA to the Court of Arbitration for Sport (CAS), which returned a guilty verdict on 12 January 2016. The guilty verdict was unsuccessfully appealed in the Federal Supreme Court of Switzerland. The thirty-four players were suspended for two years, affecting seventeen still-active AFL players who missed the 2016 season as a result of the findings.

== Supplements program details ==
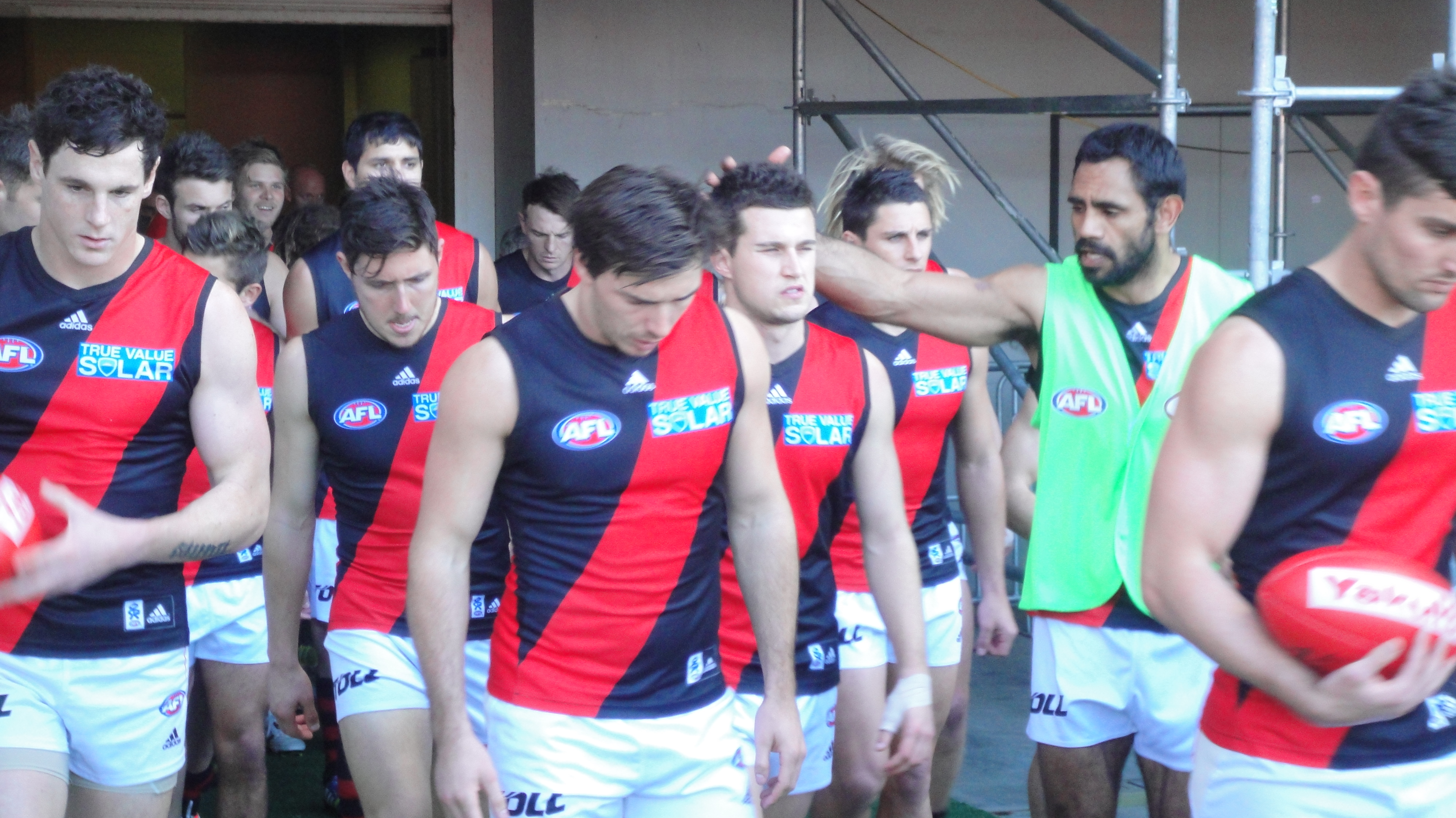
Essendon players prepare to take the field before a match against Greater Western Sydney in 2013.

On 28 September 2010, former captain James Hird was named as Essendon's new coach from 2011 on a four-year deal. Former Geelong dual premiership-winning coach and Essendon triple-premiership winning player Mark Thompson later joined the coaching panel. Thompson introduced Essendon to performance coach Dean Robinson, with whom he had worked at Geelong; and, at Robinson's suggestion, they were introduced to sports scientist Stephen Dank. The club believed that it was lagging the rest of the competition in its supplements, particularly to aid player recovery. Subsequently, the club hired Robinson as high-performance coach in September 2011 and hired Dank as a sports scientist in November 2011. Dank was given primary responsibility to establish and run the supplements program.

The program primarily comprised subcutaneous injections of supplements to improve soft tissue recovery times, to enable players to endure and benefit from a heavier training workload. The players signed consent forms for the program and were assured that all substances were ASADA-approved. The program included injections of AOD-9604, colostrum, Tribulus and an unspecified variety of thymosin supplement which was described on forms only as "thymosin" – which the Court of Arbitration for Sport (CAS) would later conclude was the banned, performance-enhancing thymosin beta-4 variety. The program also included supplements in pill form and intravenous vitamin drips. The program was intended to be leading-edge, and many features of the program which were legal at the time, including Tribulus and intravenous vitamin C, were outlawed by 2014. Most of the supplements were administered away from Essendon's Windy Hill facilities. A total of 38 players consented to the program, although ASADA ultimately pursued cases against only 34 of those players, based on the supporting evidence it found through the investigation. The program of injections began in November 2011.

In January 2012, Essendon's club doctor, Dr Bruce Reid, raised concerns about aspects of the program to the club. In particular, Dank had not liaised with Reid on the details of the program, which included administering substances that Reid had not personally approved, which was against the historical chain of accountability within the club. Reid wrote a letter to Hird and club general manager Paul Hamilton in January, recording his opinion that the substances Dank was administering were "playing at the edge" of legality with the potential to "read extremely badly in the press for [the] club", and that he was unconvinced that either the benefits or the side effects were well understood. At that point, the club's administrators agreed that Reid's approval was required in the future; however, evidence gathered during the investigation indicated Reid was largely kept out of the loop from that point on. Player Luke Davis gave evidence that he was instructed to keep the injections secret from Reid and other coaching staff, although other players disputed that they received such instructions.

In May 2012, in a meeting of club administrators including Reid and Dank, Dank was directed to cease giving injections to players; however, evidence given by players indicated that the program was reduced rather than ceased, with many continuing to receive injections until as late as July. Evidence showed that Dank continued to liaise with sports scientists and pharmacists to seek new supplements into August; investigations later described the program as being often experimental in nature. Dank was dismissed from the club in September 2012 because he had made unauthorised expenditures, the exact nature of which was not made public.

Essendon's on-field performances during the 2012 season began strongly and finished weakly, a coincidence which was later scrutinised in the context of the program. At the end of May, when the program began to be rewound, the club sat second on the ladder with an 8–1 record. The club then began to lose many players to soft tissue injuries; it won three of its next six games during the middle part of the year to drop to sixth; then lost its last seven games to finish eleventh with an 11–11 record. The CAS acknowledged these observations in its findings, noting that they carried no weight as evidence but describing them as "at least not inconsistent" with the timeline of the program. Essendon captain Jobe Watson won the 2012 Brownlow Medal as the league's fairest and best player, the game's most prestigious individual award, a title later stripped from him as a result of the supplements saga.

== Self-report and 2013 investigations ==
On 5 February 2013, Essendon reported itself to the AFL and the Australian Sports Anti-Doping Authority (ASADA) over concerns about the program. Two days later, the Australian Crime Commission (ACC) released a broad report entitled "Organised Crime and Drugs in Sport", the culmination of a twelve-month investigation which outlined an increase in illegal activities in sport across Australia, including drug use, match-fixing, and links to organised crime; part of the report dealt with an increase in the seizure and use of steroids and illegal supplements, and included an anonymous reference to Essendon's program. The timings of these events led to speculation that the AFL, having been privy to a confidential briefing on the ACC report, had tipped off Essendon and encouraged the club to self-report before the report went public, but this was never proven and was denied by the AFL. Within days, Essendon removed banners and murals from the façade at Windy Hill bearing the words "whatever it takes", which was the slogan of the club's 2013 membership drive, but now carried unfortunate doping connotations; the club struggled to distance itself from the bad publicity associated with the slogan in the wake of the scandal.

Following Essendon's self-reporting, ASADA and the AFL launched a joint investigation into the supplements program and conducted that investigation over the next sixteen months. During the early phase of the investigation, much attention and media speculation fell on the anti-obesity supplement AOD-9604, which had appeared on consent forms and was acknowledged to have been administered in the program, including by Essendon captain Jobe Watson during a television interview. The legal status of AOD-9604 at the time of the program was uncertain: it was not explicitly listed as banned under Category S2 of the World Anti Doping Agency (WADA) code, but it had not been approved for human use by the Therapeutic Goods Administration and therefore could be considered as banned under the more general Category S0, which applied to any substances not approved for human use. The official position of WADA was that AOD-9604 had been considered a banned substance under Category S0 since 2011, and it clarified this publicly to ASADA on 22 April 2013. After considering its legal position, ASADA declared that it would not pursue any cases relating to AOD-9604 use before 22 April 2013, determining that it would be too difficult to achieve a guilty verdict for a supplement that had not yet explicitly been declared banned.

Parallel to the AFL-ASADA investigation, Essendon commissioned former Telstra CEO Ziggy Switkowski to conduct a full independent review of governance and processes of the club. Switkowski's report, which was delivered on 6 May 2013, identified significant failings in governance which would later be repeated in ASADA's findings. On 23 May 2013, Essendon CEO Ian Robson resigned, agreeing with the Switkowski report's assessment that a lack of proper process had occurred in 2012. In late July, Essendon chairman David Evans resigned due to health concerns, and was replaced by deputy chairman Paul Little, who had served on the board since 2011.

At the same time as Essendon was being investigated, the Cronulla-Sutherland Sharks club from the National Rugby League was also under investigation for its 2011 supplements program. Stephen Dank was a common factor, as he had been employed at Cronulla as a sports scientist during that program; he was later banned for life from involvement in rugby league for his role in that program.

== August 2013 interim report and governance charges ==
On 2 August 2013, almost seven months into the investigation, ASADA released an interim report to the AFL and Essendon Football Club. The interim report made no findings regarding the legality of the supplements program, but highlighted a wide range of governance and duty-of-care failures related to the program. On 13 August 2013, based on the interim report, AFL general counsel Andrew Dillon charged Essendon with "conduct that is unbecoming or likely to prejudice the interests or reputation of the Australian Football League or to bring the game of football into disrepute, contrary to AFL Rule 1.6". The charges included:

- Having "engaged in practices that exposed players to significant risks to their health and safety as well as the risk of using substances that were prohibited by the AFL Anti-Doping Code and the World Anti-Doping Code".
- Allowing "a culture of frequent, uninformed and unregulated use of the injection of supplements" at the club.
- Had "failed to meaningfully inform players of the substances the subject of the program and obtain their informed consent to the administration of the substances".
- Having an incomplete record-keeping system made it impossible to determine with certainty whether or not players had been administered banned supplements.
- The bypassing of human resources practices relating specifically to the employment of Robinson and Dank.

The interim report found that Essendon had intended the program to be an innovative program of unprecedented scale to deliver a competitive edge to the club, but that it had not done adequate research nor established clear lines of accountability for those implementing the program. The AFL Tribunal later commented that there was a "deplorable absence of records in the program relating to its administration."

Essendon and the AFL discussed and negotiated penalties for the charges over two days in August. On 27 August 2013, five days before the final round of the 2013 home-and-away season, the following penalties were agreed to and imposed:

- Essendon was fined $2 million, an Australian sporting record fine against a club.
- Essendon was ruled ineligible to compete in the 2013 AFL finals series, and would be relegated to finish ninth; (the club was on track to qualify for the finals in seventh place).
- Essendon was prohibited from exercising draft picks in two drafts: in 2013, its first and second-round draft picks were prohibited, and in 2014, it was prohibited from exercising the first and second-round draft picks it would have received based on its finishing position, but was granted the last draft pick in the first round.
- Senior coach James Hird was suspended from involvement in any football club for twelve months, effective 25 August 2013.
- Football operations manager Danny Corcoran was suspended from involvement in any football club for four months, with a further two-month suspended sentence, effective 1 October 2013.
- A fine of $30,000 was imposed on assistant coach Mark Thompson. Thompson personally paid $5,000 of the fine, with Essendon covering the balance.

As part of the agreement, Hird dropped legal action that he had raised against the charges in the Supreme Court. Despite the connections between Essendon's AFL and VFL teams, the VFL team was still permitted to play in the VFL finals series.

Club doctor Bruce Reid was also charged and issued a suspension. He announced he would contest the charges in the Supreme Court of Victoria, and on 18 September 2013, the AFL dropped the charges. The league's official statement concluded: "Reid strongly supports the AFL in its fundamental priority of looking after the health and welfare of players. He shares his concern over the serious circumstances which gave rise to the supplements saga at the Essendon Football Club ... The AFL accepts Dr Reid’s position and withdraws all charges against him, without penalty."

Hird remained on the Essendon payroll and received his full salary during the suspension. The AFL initially demanded that the payments stopped when they were made public in December 2013 but acquiesced after determining that its legal position was weak. In Hird's absence, Mark Thompson stepped up to serve as senior coach in the 2014 season.

At the time of the penalties for governance failures, no charges were laid against any players, whether or not banned substances had been used was unproven, and the ASADA and AFL investigation remained open.

== Charges against players ==
=== 2014: show-cause notices ===
After sixteen months of investigations, ASADA issued show cause notices to 34 players from Essendon's 2012 player list on 12 June 2014, alleging that they had been administered Thymosin beta-4, having determined that it had sufficient evidence that this was the type of thymosin used in the program. Unlike AOD-9604, it was certain that Thymosin beta-4 was considered banned during the program. ASADA did not allege that the players had used the substances intentionally; rather, the club had knowingly injected the players with the banned substance, and that the players were unaware that it was illegal. The players had ten days to respond, which would be followed by a tribunal hearing in which the burden of proof fell on ASADA to prove that the banned substance was administered to the players. Under the anti-doping codes, players found guilty would receive, as a starting point, a two-year suspension; however, if they were able to demonstrate they were unwittingly given a prohibited substance, they may have been eligible for a 50 per cent reduction. The names of the 34 players were initially suppressed under court order, and were formally released only after the eventual guilty verdict in January 2016.

While this was progressing, Essendon performed well under Mark Thompson during the 2014 season, finishing seventh on the ladder and being eliminated in the first week of the finals. Thompson left the club altogether after the season.

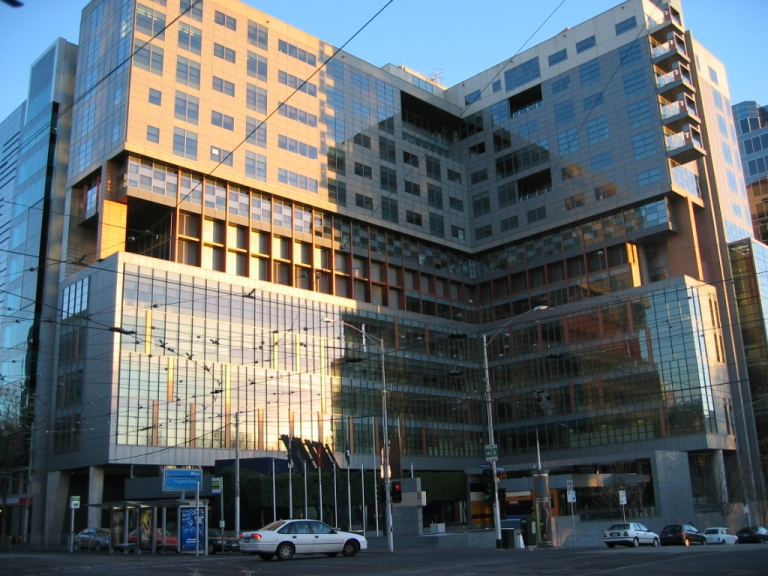
Essendon appealed the legality of the AFL/ASADA joint investigation in the Federal Court of Australia

Shortly after the show-cause notices were issued, Essendon and James Hird challenged the legal validity of the joint investigation that ASADA had conducted with the AFL, temporarily putting the notices on hold. The club argued that although AFL rules allowed it to compel its players and officials to be interviewed, ASADA had no legal right to do the same – and therefore that evidence collected by the AFL in a compulsory interview was inadmissible for an ASADA investigation. The case came before the Melbourne division of the Federal Court of Australia on 27 June 2014; and on 19 September 2014, Justice John Middleton of the Federal Court dismissed the challenge and found investigation to be lawful. In the decision, he ruled that ASADA had actively used the AFL's power to compel interviews to overcome its own inability to do likewise; but, that this was within the rule of law and with the Essendon players' knowledge, because all interviews were knowingly held in the presence of an ASADA representative.

On 1 October 2014, Essendon announced that it would not appeal the ruling, stating that to do so would act against the interests of the players. Hird, however, acting in an individual capacity and "on a matter of principle", appealed the ruling to a full bench of the Federal Court. Media commentators speculated that Hird's action would result in his termination as Essendon coach, and Hird himself later testified in court that he had been advised as much, but this did not occur and he remained to coach in 2015. Hird returned to court in early November 2014, and his appeal was dismissed on 29 January 2015. Hird considered a High Court appeal, but on 27 February 2015 announced that he had decided against proceeding.

=== 2014–2015: AFL Tribunal hearing against players ===
After Essendon's Federal Court challenge was dismissed in October 2014 (but while Hird's was still ongoing), ASADA issued fresh show-cause notices to the players on 17 October 2014. The players had two weeks to respond to the notices and exercised their right not to respond. On 13 November 2014, the Anti-Doping Rule Violation Panel concluded that sufficient evidence existed against the players, and they were placed on the register of findings. The following day, the AFL issued infraction notices to the players. The players faced a closed hearing of the AFL Tribunal over several sessions between December 2014 and February 2015. The burden of proof fell to ASADA, and the required standard of proof to return a guilty verdict was "comfortable satisfaction".

Upon issuing of the infractions notices on 14 November, players could accept provisional suspensions, meaning they would be ineligible to play AFL-sanctioned matches until the Tribunal hearing was finalised, but that they could continue to train in the pre-season, and that time served during the provisional suspension would be counted as part of any final suspension. Most players accepted the provisional suspensions immediately; Dustin Fletcher and Jobe Watson both participated in the 2014 International Rules Series test match on 22 November before beginning their suspensions; Alwyn Davey and Leroy Jetta, neither of whom was on the Essendon list any longer, both opted to play the 2014/15 Northern Territory Football League season (which runs over the Australian summer), and did not begin their provisional suspensions until February 2015.

After the tribunal hearings were complete, it was announced that a final decision was expected in late March. This meant that the thirty-four players, including seventeen still at Essendon, would be under provisional suspension during the 2015 NAB Challenge pre-season matches. All twenty-five Essendon players who were at the club during the supplements program received permission to miss the series, including eight players who were not facing charges but were permitted to stand aside to protect their teammates' anonymity; of those eight players, four elected to play. Essendon was given permission to field VFL-listed players from its reserves team, and to sign players from state leagues to temporary contracts to serve as top-up players during the NAB Challenge.

On 31 March, the week before the opening of the 2015 AFL season, the tribunal announced that it had found the 34 players not guilty. The tribunal confirmed that Thymosin beta-4 was a banned substance during the program, but that it was not comfortably satisfied that the players had been administered the substance. The three-member tribunal was unanimous in its decision. The tribunal repeated prior criticisms of the governance of the Essendon's supplements program, which had been seen in the ASADA interim report and the Switkowski report.

As a result of the verdict, the provisional suspensions on the players were lifted, and all affected players were eligible to play in Round 1. ASADA and the AFL were given a window of 21 days to appeal the decision. The verdict was handed down in private, and few other details about the reasons for the decision were released.

=== 2015 season and WADA appeal ===
On 20 April 2015, ASADA announced that it would not appeal the AFL Anti-Doping Tribunal's not-guilty verdicts. ASADA's decision then allowed the World Anti-Doping Agency (WADA) to initiate its own review and appeal, and it announced its intention to appeal on 11 May. The appeal was a de novo hearing of the charges in the Swiss headquartered Court of Arbitration for Sport (CAS). The players were permitted to continue playing throughout the appeal process. In the process of lodging its appeal, the CAS erroneously made public on its website the names of the players; the names were promptly removed, but the players' anonymity was for the first time compromised.

On-field, Essendon's form deteriorated dramatically in 2015, attributed in part to the mental impact of the WADA appeal. The club held a 3–3 record before WADA announced its appeal, before finishing 15th with a record of 6–16. Hird resigned as coach with three weeks remaining in the season. Chairman Paul Little, after chairing the club since July 2013, also stepped down after the season, and was replaced by Lindsay Tanner.

CAS began to hear WADA's appeal on 16 November 2015 in Sydney. CAS's panel of arbitrators comprised English barrister Michael Beloff QC, Belgian-based barrister Romano Subiotto QC and Australian barrister James Spigelman QC.

=== 2016: Court of Arbitration for Sport verdict ===
On 12 January 2016, CAS handed down a guilty verdict on the thirty-four Essendon players, overturning the AFL Anti-Doping Tribunal's not-guilty verdict, after finding it was comfortably satisfied that the players were injected with Thymosin beta-4. Key to the appeal's success was the treatment of evidence: the CAS rejected the AFL Tribunal's approach, known as "links in the chain", where any individual chain of evidence is dismissed if any one link within it cannot be proven, and endorsed WADA's approach, known as "strands in the cable", where individual evidence chains with missing links may still be accepted if the combination of all such chains forms a sufficiently strong case. A complete account of the verdict and the arguments made by each side was released publicly.

Vital to the case was determining whether or not the unspecified Thymosin used in the program was the banned Thymosin Beta-4 or a different, legal variety of Thymosin. A paper trail had confirmed that Dank had been dispensed Thymosin Beta-4 by the Como Compounding Pharmacy; however, no direct evidence was found that it was this Thymosin rather than a different legal Thymosin which had been administered to players, and this missing evidence link had been key to the AFL Tribunal's not guilty verdict under the 'links in the chain' method. Part of the WADA submission to the appeal, which the CAS accepted in its verdict, was that Thymosin Beta-4 was the only form of Thymosin which would have had the soft tissue recovery effect that Dank had attributed to it – text messages from Dank had specifically described Thymosin as the cornerstone of the soft tissue recovery program. Two urine samples taken from Essendon players during 2012 were also found to contain elevated Thymosin Beta-4; the levels were not high enough to fail the drug test, but they added to the cable of evidence against the players.

Significantly, the CAS also determined that the players were "significantly at fault", disqualifying them from any penalty reduction. This was considered a surprise, as press throughout the entire saga had opined that by having followed the direction of club officials, the players would be found to have had no significant fault or negligence, qualifying them for a 50% penalty reduction. Key to this finding was the revelation that none of the eighteen different players who had been drug tested on a total of thirty occasions during the program had declared the supplements injections on their doping control forms, and that some had withheld information from the club doctor on Dank's instruction – revelations which damaged the credibility of other evidence put forward by the players. Consequently, the players were handed the full minimum suspensions of two years – these were backdated to 31 March 2015, which was the date of the original AFL Tribunal not guilty verdict; and, with credit taken for the periods of provisional suspension already served during the 2014/15 offseason, resulted in most of the suspensions running until November 2016.

=== 2016: Federal Supreme Court appeal ===
Following the CAS finding, the sole remaining avenue for appeal was the Federal Supreme Court of Switzerland, under whose jurisdiction the CAS sits. An appeal was lodged on 10 February, arguing that the CAS did not have legal grounds to conduct a de novo hearing and could have appealed the AFL Tribunal's verdict only based on legal error or gross unreasonableness.

During the year, both parties submitted paperwork in German to the Federal Supreme Court. The court deliberated on the written submissions, and on 11 October 2016 dismissed the appeal, upholding the guilty verdicts and the suspensions:

The Swiss Federal Tribunal (SFT) has decided not to entertain the appeal filed by the players against the CAS award of 11 January 2016, imposing a 2-year ban on each player following an anti-doping rule violation. The SFT determined that since the players did not formally challenge the jurisdiction of CAS during the arbitration procedure and accepted the application of the CAS Rules (including the rule providing for a de novo hearing, i.e. for a procedure allowing the CAS to conduct a full review of the case), they had lost their right to challenge the CAS jurisdiction in appeal. The SFT added that, even if the players had properly challenged the jurisdiction of CAS, CAS jurisdiction in this matter would have been confirmed, and the appeal would have been dismissed.

— Federal Supreme Court, in Switzerland, Ruling of the Court, English Translation

The players did not seek an injunction against their suspensions when appealing with the Federal Supreme Court, meaning that they would have served their 2016 suspensions even if the guilty verdicts had been cleared. This was to eliminate any risk that a new, two-year period of suspension could be ordered to be served in full if the appeal were unsuccessful.

== Penalties ==
Following the CAS's guilty verdict on 12 January 2016, all affected players were formally named and began their suspensions immediately. The two-year ineligibility period was backdated to 31 March 2015, and credit was taken for provisional suspensions served during the 2014/15 offseason. This meant that most players were suspended until November 2016, and missed the entire 2016 season. Alwyn Davey and Leroy Jetta, who had served shorter provisional suspensions, were suspended until February 2017, which saw them miss the end of the 2015/16 NTFL season, the 2016 winter season and most of the 2016/17 NTFL season.

Under the terms of the ban players were not permitted to:

- Play Australian rules football at any level;
- Enter the club premises or clubrooms on game day;
- Train under the direction of a club-devised program; or
- Return to their clubs' training sessions until two months before their bans expired.

Because of these limitations, the bans also covered most forms of coaching. As such, two former players (Mark McVeigh and Henry Slattery) who were employed as non-playing coaches were suspended from their jobs, and players serving as playing coaches in country leagues were suspended from performing either function. The bans extended to any sport administered by a signatory to the WADA code, precluding active involvement in almost any organised sport during 2016.

Players were not completely banned from involvement with the AFL, and were permitted to:

- Attend AFL matches, including those involving Essendon, as spectators;
- Continue to communicate with their teammates and coaches on a social level;
- Train away from the club with other banned players, except in a club-devised program, and;
- Work in the media at AFL games

The thirty-four players suspended are listed in the below table, grouped by their status at the time of the CAS verdict.

Status	Number	Players
Still at Essendon	12	Tom Bellchambers, Travis Colyer, Dyson Heppell, Michael Hibberd, Heath Hocking, Cale Hooker, Ben Howlett, Michael Hurley, David Myers, Tayte Pears, Brent Stanton, and Jobe Watson
Listed at other AFL clubs	5	Jake Carlisle (St Kilda), Stewart Crameri (Western Bulldogs), Jake Melksham (Melbourne), Angus Monfries and Paddy Ryder (Port Adelaide)
Still active at lower levels	14	Alex Browne, Alwyn Davey, Luke Davis, Cory Dell'Olio, Ricky Dyson, Dustin Fletcher, Scott Gumbleton, Kyle Hardingham, Leroy Jetta, Brendan Lee, Sam Lonergan, Nathan Lovett-Murray, Brent Prismall, and Ariel Steinberg
Retired from playing but still coaching	2	Mark McVeigh (Greater Western Sydney assistant coach) and Henry Slattery
Retired from football	1	David Hille

On 15 November 2016, after the final avenue for appeal had been exhausted with the Federal Supreme Court, the AFL Commission reviewed the 2012 Brownlow Medal, which had been won by Jobe Watson as the fairest and best player in the league during the season in which the supplements program was in effect. The rules governing the Brownlow Medal make a player ineligible to win in a season in which he is suspended; and the commission ruled that Watson's doping suspensions rendered him retrospectively ineligible under that rule. Watson was stripped of the medal, and it was awarded jointly to the players who polled the second-most votes: Trent Cotchin (Richmond) and Sam Mitchell (Hawthorn). Watson had pre-empted the decision to strip him of the award, announcing his intention to hand back the medal four days earlier. Watson was not stripped of his place in the 2012 All-Australian team, which was the other AFL award he received for his on-field performances during 2012.

=== 2016 AFL season ===
The CAS verdict meant that Essendon's squad was suddenly twelve players short for the 2016 season. The club received permission to recruit ten top-up players from lower levels on contracts lasting until 31 October 2016 to supplement its list. The top-ups had to have either been on an AFL list in 2014 or 2015, with no more than one player taken from any single state-level club; or have been a VFL-listed player from Essendon's own reserves team. An allowance for the top-ups was made in Essendon's salary cap. The top-up players were: Ryan Crowley, James Kelly, Matthew Stokes, Matt Dea, James Polkinghorne, Jonathan Simpkin, Mark Jamar, Sam Grimley, Nathan Grima and Sam Michael. The four other AFL clubs with suspended Essendon players on their lists (Melbourne, Port Adelaide, St Kilda and the Western Bulldogs) were allowed to upgrade a rookie to the senior list, which would not normally be allowed to cover a suspended player, but were not granted top-up players.

The twelve suspended players still at Essendon continued to be paid about 95% of their salaries by the club during their suspensions. Stewart Crameri continued to be paid by the Western Bulldogs, with the Bulldogs suing Essendon to recover the cost. Melbourne, Port Adelaide and St Kilda ceased payments to their suspended players, those players suing Essendon privately for their salaries. By September 2017, the club had reached out-of-court compensation deals with all players, covering potential and actual loss of earnings and mental anguish; the sizes of the deals were confidential, but the largest payouts were understood to have gone to Jobe Watson, who was stripped of the Brownlow Medal, and Stewart Crameri, who missed the Western Bulldogs' 2016 premiership.

Despite the top-up players, the weakened Essendon team was mostly uncompetitive during 2016, finishing last on the ladder with just three wins to win the wooden spoon for the first time since 1933. The club's win–loss record of 3–19 was, at the time, the second-worst in club history, and included a club-record seventeen-game losing streak (since equalled between 2025–26). Financially, the club posted a $9.8 million uninsured operating loss for the season, with roughly half of the cost in legal fees and compensation payments to the guilty players, and with reduced receipts and the payments to top-up players also having a significant effect.

Ten of the twelve suspended players re-signed with Essendon for 2017; the two who departed were Michael Hibberd, who was traded to Melbourne, and Tayte Pears, who retired. There was speculation that the players could have left the club en masse, with lawyers arguing that Essendon's role in the scandal could have been considered a breach of contract, allowing the players to get out of their playing contracts and bypass other AFL player movement restrictions to qualify as delisted free agents, but no players sought this option. Of the ten top-up players, only two (James Kelly and Matt Dea) remained with the club beyond the 2016 season: Kelly played one further season before retiring, and Dea played two more seasons before being delisted.

== Case against Stephen Dank ==
The AFL Tribunal heard cases against sports scientist Stephen Dank during the summer of 2014/15, and he was found guilty of ten charges. The charges upheld against Dank covered a wide range of illegal supplements that he trafficked in, attempted to traffic in, or was complicit in attempted trafficking when the AFL registered him. The upheld charges were:

- Attempted trafficking and complicity in attempted trafficking in Thymosin Beta-4, Hexarelin and Humanofort to Essendon in 2012
- Trafficking in Mechano Growth Factor to a support staff member of the Carlton Football Club in 2012
- Attempted trafficking and complicity in attempted trafficking in CJC-1295 to the Gold Coast Football Club in 2010
- Trafficking in GHRP-6 and complicity in attempted trafficking in Hexarelin, SARMS, CJC-1295 and GHRP6 to a baseball club in 2012
- Trafficking in GHRP6 and Mechano Growth Factor to the Medical Rejuvenation Clinic in 2011–2012.

The AFL suspended Dank from involvement in the sport for life. Since most Australian sporting organisations honour sanctions imposed by other leagues, this effectively blackballed Dank from major Australian sport. Dank was found not guilty of twenty-one other charges, including trafficking charges and all charges related to administering the supplements. Dank appealed the ten guilty verdicts, but the appeals were dismissed after he failed to attend his session with the AFL appeals board in November 2016. WADA lodged an appeal against the twenty-one not guilty verdicts in June 2015.

== Other consequences ==
Dean Robinson, who was sacked by the club in February 2013 when it self-reported the program, brought an unfair dismissal case against the club, which was settled in October 2014 for a $1 million payout.

Most of the club's expenses related to the scandal, including legal bills and the payout to Robinson, were covered by Essendon's insurers, Chubb Limited. Hird, however, was left with a large personal legal bill, because the insurance policy for administrative staff covered only the defence of a legal action, not initiating a legal action against others. Hird unsuccessfully sued Chubb for approximately $660,000 in costs in his 2014 court challenges of legality of the AFL/ASADA joint investigation, but it was later revealed that a benefactor who was not publicly identified stepped in to cover the costs. Hird's total legal costs from the saga, including covering ASADA's costs in his failed cases against it, totalled $1.74 million.

Former player Hal Hunter, who was on the rookie list during the program but was not among the thirty-four players suspended, sued the club to obtain full documentation about what substances he was administered at the club. After a year-long legal battle, the Supreme Court ruled in early 2016 that Essendon had already provided Hunter with all documentation it had; Hunter was initially ordered to cover Essendon's legal costs for the lawsuit, but that was reversed after mediation. Similarly to the other 34 players, Hunter received a compensation package from Essendon for involving him in the program.

Following adverse findings of the program, WorkSafe Victoria performed an investigation. In November 2015, it convicted Essendon of two breaches of the state's Occupational Health and Safety Act for failing to provide the players with a workplace free of health risks. The club was fined $200,000 for the breaches.

The handling of the investigation and prosecution by both the AFL and ASADA was criticised by some media personnel and other public figures. There were suggestions that a parliamentary inquiry should be held into the saga, but this was ruled out by Greg Hunt, Minister for Sport, in March 2017.

== Timeline of major events ==
Date	Event	Notes
November 2011	A new supplements program, administered by biochemist Stephen Dank, begins at the Essendon Football Club.	
January 2012	Concerns about the program are raised to club management by a doctor Bruce Reid.	
May 2012	Club administrators direct Dank to cease the injection program, but this request is not followed.	
September 2012	Dank is dismissed from Essendon.	
5 February 2013	Essendon self-reports over concerns that illicit substances were administered during the supplements program.	
7 February 2013	The Australian Crime Commission releases the findings of a 12-month investigation into the integrity of Australian sport and the relationship between professional sporting bodies, prohibited substances and organised crime.	
7 February 2013	The Australian Sports Anti-Doping Authority (ASADA) and the AFL initiate a joint investigation into the Essendon supplements program.	
27 February 2013	Essendon announces an independent review to be conducted by former Telstra boss Ziggy Switkowski into the governance of its supplements program.	
22 April 2013	The World Anti Doping Agency (WADA) officially clarifies its position that AOD-9604 is a banned substance; ASADA later determines that it will not prosecute cases of its use before this date.	
6 May 2013	Switkowski's independent review into the governance of Essendon's supplements program is released to the public. It highlights governance failures and uncontrolled changes to how the club's player conditioning program was operated after August 2011.	
2 August 2013	ASADA releases its interim report on Essendon's supplements program to the AFL.	
13 August 2013	The AFL charges the Essendon Football Club, senior coach James Hird and other parties over governance and duty-of-care breaches related to the program.	
22 August 2013	James Hird lodges an action against the charges in the Supreme Court of Victoria.	
27 August 2013	Following talks between the AFL and the accused parties, the AFL announces that the Essendon Football Club would be ineligible to play in the 2013 AFL finals series, would lose first and second-round draft picks in the 2013 and 2014 AFL drafts and receive a $2 million fine. Penalties for individuals include suspensions for both senior coach James Hird (12 months, backdated to 25 August 2013) and football operations manager Danny Corcoran (four months, starting 1 October 2013, and a further two months withheld) and a $30,000 fine for assistant coach Mark Thompson. Hird drops his Supreme Court action.	
12 June 2014	ASADA issues show cause notices to 34 players on Essendon's 2012 player list, alleging the use of banned peptide Thymosin Beta-4.	
13 June 2014	Essendon and James Hird each launch a Federal Court application challenging the legality of the AFL/ASADA joint investigative process.	
19 September 2014	Justice John Middleton rules that the AFL/ASADA's joint investigation was lawful.	
17 October 2014	ASADA issues fresh show cause notices to the thirty-four players for use of thymosin beta-4.	
13 November 2014	The Anti-Doping Rule Violation Panel places the 34 players on the register of findings.	
14 November 2014	The AFL issues infraction notices to the thirty-four players for use of Thymosin beta-4. Most players immediately accept provisional suspensions until their AFL Tribunal hearing (some defer the start of their suspensions until later).	
Dec 2014 – Feb 2015	The AFL Anti-Doping Tribunal hearing for the thirty-four players takes place over several sessions.	
31 March 2015	The AFL Tribunal announces that all 34 past and present Essendon players were found not guilty of using a banned supplement.	
20 April 2015	ASADA announces that it will not appeal the AFL Anti-Doping Tribunal's ruling.	
11 May 2015	WADA announces it will appeal the tribunal's not guilty decisions to the Court of Arbitration for Sport (CAS). An error by CAS identifies the players publicly for the first time.	
26 June 2015	Stephen Dank is found guilty and handed a lifetime ban for his role in the saga.	
16 November 2015	WADA's appeal of the AFL Anti-Doping Tribunal's not guilty decision begins being heard at the Court of Arbitration for Sport in Sydney.	
12 January 2016	CAS upholds WADA's appeal and finds the 34 Essendon footballers guilty of doping code violations. The players are suspended for two years, backdated to 31 March 2015.	
10 February 2016	The 34 players appeal against the CAS finding in the Federal Supreme Court of Switzerland.	
11 October 2016	The Federal Supreme Court of Switzerland dismisses the players' appeal against the CAS guilty verdict.	
28 November 2016	AFL Anti-Doping Appeal Board dismisses Stephen Dank's appeal against his life ban for multiple doping offences, after he fails to provide detailed evidence for his absence from his hearing on 21 November 2016.	

== See also ==
- Cronulla-Sutherland Sharks supplements saga
- Drugs in the Australian Football League
- Drugs in sport in Australia
- List of Australian sports controversies
- List of doping cases in sport (E)
- List of sporting scandals
