= Stephen Dank =

Australian biochemist

- Occupations: Biochemist; sports scientist
- Known for: Essendon Football Club supplements saga

Stephen Dank (born c. 1963) is an Australian biochemist who worked as a sports scientist at several professional sports club. He is known for his key role in two major sports drug cheating scandals, the Essendon Football Club supplements saga and the Cronulla-Sutherland Sharks supplements saga, where he injected players with illegal substances to improve their performance.

He is known for his unorthodox treatment and diagnostic methods, including using calf blood and profiling players' DNA. Des Hasler described Dank as 'a great analytical thinker', in particular highlighting his contributions in the area of GPS application, statistical science, and altitude simulation training. In light of his unorthodox treatment methods, in November 2016 Dank was given a life-long ban from association with the Australian Football League. On 28 November 2016, the Australian Sports Anti-Doping Authority (ASADA), (known as Sport Integrity Australia since July 1 2020), officially acknowledged the decision of the AFL Appeal Board

He worked with National Rugby League clubs the Manly Sea Eagles and Cronulla Sharks and Australian rules football clubs, Essendon Football Club and the Gold Coast Suns.

== Australian Football League doping scandal ==
In February 2013, Essendon announced that they had asked the Australian Sports Anti-Doping Authority (ASADA) to investigate the supplements program that Dank had overseen at their club during the 2012 season. A former player, Kyle Reimers, had claimed that the players were asked to sign waivers and were injected with supplements that were "pushing the boundaries". Another former player, Mark McVeigh countered that the injections were only vitamins and all were completely legal and not on any World Anti-Doping Agency (WADA) banned substance list. Dank left Essendon at the end of the 2012 season, and high-performance manager Dean 'The Weapon' Robinson was suspended from the club after the announcement of the investigation. Stephen Dank controversially admitted to a Fairfax journalist that he had been using thymosin beta 4 on Essendon players. When journalist Nick McKenzie pointed out that that drug was prohibited by WADA under its S2 classification, Dank hesitated and then seemed extremely surprised: "Well, that must have just only come in this year and I will get someone to speak to ASADA about that. That's just mind-blowing." After 24 hours, Dank informed Fairfax media that he was actually really talking about thymomodulin which was a permitted substance.

In 2015, the AFL Tribunal found him guilty of trafficking in a number of illicit supplements and banned him from any association with the AFL for life. Since most Australian sporting organisations honour sanctions imposed by other leagues, this had the effect of blackballing Dank from major Australian sport. Dank was found not guilty of twenty-one other charges, including trafficking charges and all charges related to administering the supplements. Dank appealed the ten guilty verdicts against him, but the appeals were dismissed after Dank failed to attend the session scheduled for him with the AFL appeals board in November 2016. WADA lodged an appeal against the twenty-one not guilty verdicts in June 2015.

Following the publication of the Australian Crime Commission report into Organised Crime and Drugs in Sport, lawyers acting for Dank launched a $10 million defamation suit alleging that a subsidiary of News Corporation had falsely accused him of providing illegal drugs to elite athletes and contributing to Jon Mannah's cancer relapse. In March 2016, a jury found that most of the accusations were substantially true and that he had acted with "reckless indifference" to the health of players. His claims for defamation were rejected.

== Other controversies ==
Other proceedings are active before Australian courts regarding Dank's supply of thymosin beta on sportsmen. Findings were made that he supplied the drug to a Mr Earl by the Administrative Appeals Tribunal in 2015; these proceedings are subject to appeal, but were noted by the Court of Arbitration for Sport in their findings regarding the Essendon Football Club doping scandal.

In July 2016, Dank was targeted by a drive-by shooting attack that injured him.

In 2017, it was reported that Dank entered bankruptcy.
