= List of Australian sports controversies =

This is a list of major sports controversies in Australia or concerning Australian sportspeople. These controversies cover areas such as rules, match fixing, cheating, sportsmanship, doping and sport administration. They have generated large scale media coverage over a period of time and may have resulted in a large scale inquiry. These controversies affect the integrity of sport.

Sport, Event or Topic	Dates	Summary of Controversy
Cricket	1879	Sydney riot of 1879 – In a match between New South Wales and England, a riot was sparked by a controversial umpiring decision, when star Australian batsman Billy Murdoch was given out by George Coulthard, a Victorian employed by the Englishmen.
Cricket	1884	Billy Murdoch, the Australian captain, led a players' strike, where the Australian players refused to play unless they received a greater share of the gate takings.
Cycling	1904	Seven riders were disqualified for up to three years after the Sydney Thousand, once the world's richest cycling race, when they deliberately blocked the race favourite. Due to the scandal, the public lost confidence in professional cycling.
Boxing	1908	African American boxer Jack Johnson defeated Tommy Burns at the Sydney Stadium to become world heavy weight champion. The victory shattered the notion of white man's superiority and led to race riots and lynching in the United States.
Boxing	1908	At the 1908 London Olympics, 'Snowy' Baker won the silver medal in the middleweight boxing division, losing narrowly on points to Britain's Johnny Douglas. The referee was Douglas' father and his casting vote awarded the fight to his son.
Rugby league	1909	1909 NSWRFL Grand Final – The South Sydney Rabbitohs and Balmain Tigers had unofficially agreed to boycott the grand final in protest at New South Wales Rugby League's plans for a match between the Australian rugby union and rugby league teams that would have upstaged the final. South Sydney turned up ready to play and were awarded the premiership as Balmain was not present.
Australian football	1910	Several Carlton Football Club VFL players were suspected of having taken bribes to fix matches, with two players, Alex Lang and Doug Fraser both found guilty and suspended for 99 matches.
Boxing	1917	Boxer Les Darcy died in the United States. His failure to enlist in World War I resulted in him being banned from boxing and being called a coward and deserter by many politicians and the media.
Australian football	1922	After the 1922 VFA Grand Final, Vern Banbury was accused by a number of Port Melbourne Football Club players of paying money to throw the match in Footscray Football Club's favour. Banbury subsequently received a life ban from the VFA.
Horse racing	1932	Death of Phar Lap on 5 April in the United States after a sudden and mysterious illness. It was believed that Phar Lap (New Zealand born and bred) was poisoned by American gangsters who feared big losses after he had easily won the Agua Caliente Handicap in Mexico despite attempts to stop him.
Cricket	1932–1933	Bodyline controversy between Australian and English cricket teams over fast bowling tactics. The controversy threatened the political relationship between Australia and England.
Water polo	1956	Blood in the Water match – a match between Hungary and USSR at the 1956 Melbourne Olympics was abandoned after violence in the pool. The match was held during the 1956 Hungarian Revolution.
Soccer	1960	The Australian Soccer Association was suspended from FIFA for the poaching of players from overseas.
Swimming	1960	The United States protested against John Devitt's win in the 100m freestyle at the 1960 Rome Olympics. Time keepers awarded the race to Lance Larson but two judges awarded the race to Devitt. The appeal jury rejected the United States appeal.
Horse racing	1961	Jockey Mel Schumacher, riding Blue Era, was disqualified for life for grabbing the leg of Tommy Hill, the rider of Summer Fair, in the dying seconds of the AJC Derby.
Cricket	1963	Australian fast bowler Ian Meckiff was no-balled for throwing in the First Test against South Africa by Australian umpire Col Egar.
Swimming	1965	Dawn Fraser was suspended for 10 years by the Australian Swimming Union (ASU) but for stealing flags from Japan's Imperial Palace during the Tokyo Olympics. The ban was later reduced to four years. The ASU also banned three other swimmers – Linda McGill, Nan Duncan and Marlene Dayman for three years.
Australian football	1967	1967 VFA Grand Final – Port Melbourne Football Club nearly forfeited in protest at the performance of umpire David Jackson. Historian John Devaney states that it was "indisputably one of the most infamous matches in Australian football history".
Athletics	1968	Black Power salute – Australian sprinter Peter Norman supported African Americans Tommie Smith and Juan Carlos' black power salute during the medal ceremony for the 200m at the 1968 Olympics in Mexico. Norman wore a pro-human rights badge to show his support.
Horse racing	1969	Melbourne Cup favourite Big Philou was scratched by stewards 39 minutes prior to the race. Testing revealed the horse had been administered the drug Danthron.
Rugby union	1971	The 1971 South Africa rugby union tour of Australia resulted in many anti-apartheid protests around Australia, particularly during games.
Cricket	1971	English captain Ray Illingworth took his team off the field after fast bowler John Snow was grabbed by a spectator, and had beer-cans thrown at him. This occurred after Snow had hit low order batsman Terry Jenner in the head with a bouncer.
Athletics	1976	Sprinter Raelene Boyle was disqualified after two false starts in the final of women's 200m at the 1976 Montreal Olympics. A video replay later showed that she had not false started on her first start.
Olympic Games	1976	The Australian team failed to win a gold medal at the 1976 Montreal Olympics, leading to a public outcry and calls for improved support for Australian athletes. In 1981, the Australian Institute of Sport was established to improve Australian performances in international sport.
Cricket	1977	Kerry Packer's World Series Cricket (WSC) breakaway competition dramatically changed the nature of cricket. The two main factors behind WSC were restrictive broadcast rights and player payments.
Olympic Games	1980	Several Australian athletes and teams boycotted the 1980 Moscow Olympics at the request of the Australian Government.
Cricket	1981	Underarm bowling incident during one day international between Australia and New Zealand – Greg Chappell ordered his brother Trevor to roll the final delivery along the ground to make it impossible for New Zealand to hit the six it needed to tie the match.
Horse racing	1984	Fine Cotton horse racing substitution (or ring in) at Eagle Farm Racecourse.
Doping in sport	1988	Senate Drugs in Sport Inquiry into doping allegations concerning the AIS and sport in Australia – The Government established the Australian Sports Drug Agency (now Australian Sports Anti Doping Authority) as a response to the Inquiry.
Modern pentathlon	1988	Australian modern pentathlete Alex Watson was found guilty of excessive levels of caffeine at the Seoul Olympics. Watson later cleared his name and was allowed to compete at 1992 Barcelona Olympics.
Australian football	1993	Nicky Winmar, a St Kilda Football Club player, responded to racial taunts by Collingwood Football Club supporters by pointing to his skin.
Sports facilities	1993–1994	Sports rorts affair – Ros Kelly, Minister for Sport, was unable to appropriately explain the distribution of federal sporting grants to marginal electorates held by the governing Australian Labor Party
Athletics	1994	Cathy Freeman caused a huge outcry by waving both the Aboriginal and Australian Flags during her victory lap after winning the 200m at the 1994 Commonwealth Games. Protocol dictated that only the national flag could be carried.
Cricket	1994	Denise Annetts claimed her omission from the Australian team was because she was not a lesbian. The Australian Anti-Discrimination Board could not investigate the complaint as discrimination law at the time only protected homosexuals.
Cricket	1994–1995	John the bookmaker controversy – Shane Warne, Mark Waugh and Tim May alleged that Pakistani cricketer Salim Malik had tried to bribe them in 1994 to under-perform.
Cricket	1995	Sri Lankan spin bowler Muttiah Muralitharan was called for throwing by Australian umpire Darryl Hair on Boxing Day, the biggest day in Australian Cricket.
Rugby league	1997	Super League war was a dispute between the Rupert Murdoch and News Corporation-backed Super League (Australia) and the Kerry Packer and Optus Vision-backed Australian Rugby League over broadcasting rights for, and ultimately control of, the top-level professional rugby league football competition of Australasia. In 1997, there were two competing national rugby league competitions in Australia.
Yachting	1998	The 1998 Sydney to Hobart Yacht Race was the most disastrous in the race's history, with the loss of six lives and five yachts. A coroner's inquest into the deaths was critical of both the race management at the time and the Bureau of Meteorology.
Paralympic Games	2000	Basketball controversy – the Spanish intellectual disability basketball team was stripped of its gold medal after the Games, after it was found that 10 of the 12 competitors in the team were not disabled.
Rugby league	2002	Canterbury-Bankstown Bulldogs salary cap breach – Bulldogs found guilty of systemic breaches of the salary cap, fined $500,000, and stripped of all 37 competition points.
Australian football	2002	Carlton Football Club salary cap breach – Carlton found guilty of elaborate and sophisticated breaches of the salary cap during 2000 and 2001. The club was fined $930,000 and stripped of draft picks.
Rowing	2004	Sally Robbins dropped her oar during the final of the women's eights at the 2004 Athens Olympics. Robbins was accused of mental weakness and publicly ridiculed in the Australian media as "Lay-down Sally".
Swimming	2004	Ian Thorpe false start controversy at the 2004 Australian Swimming Olympic Trials. Craig Stevens forfeited his place in the 400m at the 2004 Athens Olympics so that Thorpe could defend his title, which he successfully did.
Cycling	2004	Australian Sports Commission and Cycling Australia investigated doping allegations concerning the Australian Institute of Sport track cycling team based in Adelaide, South Australia. Mark French was banned for two years, but in July 2005 the ban was overturned by the Court of Arbitration for Sport due to lack of evidence.
Australian rules football	2006	An AFL match between St Kilda and Fremantle ended in controversy when the umpires failed to hear the final siren, after which St Kilda's Steven Baker scored a behind, tying the scores at 94–all. Fremantle successfully protested the result, and were awarded the win 94–93.
Rugby league	2010	Melbourne Storm salary cap breach – the Storm were found guilty of salary cap breaches over five years. The club was stripped of its 2007 and 2009 premierships, among other team achievements, and forced to play for no points for the remainder of the 2010 season from Round 7 onwards.
Rugby league	2010	2010 rugby league spot-fixing scandal – Ryan Tandy was involved manipulating the first point scoring in a National Rugby League game between Canterbury-Bankstown Bulldogs and North Queensland Cowboys.
Swimming	2012	The Australian men's freestyle sprint relay team misbehaviour at the 2012 London Olympics resulted in several inquiries. Members of the team used Stillnox, which was banned by the Australian Olympic Committee, and the team's bonding activities adversely affected other swimmers.
Australian football	2013	Melbourne Football Club tanking scandal – the AFL found Dean Bailey and Chris Connolly guilty of "acting in a manner prejudicial to the interests of the competition" during the 2009 season.
Doping in sport	2013	Australian Crime Commission report into organised crime and sport. The report's allegations focused on athletes and teams in the Australian Football League and National Rugby League.
Australian rules football	2013–2016	Essendon Football Club supplements saga – the AFL found that Essendon had brought the AFL into disrepute and handed down severe penalties – $2 million fine, suspension from the 2013 finals series, removal of first round drafts picks and penalties to Essendon football department officials including the one-year suspension of Coach James Hird. The AFL Anti Doping Tribunal found the players not guilty. WADA appealed this decision and in January 2016 the not-guilty verdict was overturned by the Court of Arbitration for Sport. The thirty-four Essendon players were suspended for two years backdated to 31 March 2015; including time served in provisional suspensions during the 2014/15 offseason, this brought the suspensions for almost all of the players to an end in November 2016.
Rugby league	2013	Cronulla-Sutherland Sharks supplements saga – The National Rugby League (NRL) investigated the Cronulla-Sutherland Sharks over irregularities in its supplements program and handed down severe penalties including a $1 million fine, the 12-month suspension of Shane Flanagan as head coach and the deregistration of Trent Elkin as the club's trainer.
Soccer	2013	Southern Stars FC players were accused of match fixing in the Victorian Premier League.
Australian football	2015	Adam Goodes during matches played outside Sydney was constantly booed by spectators. It was suggested that Goodes was booed as a result of an incident in 2013 with a 13-year-old girl who called him an ape, comments made during his 2014 Australian of the Year award and the way he plays and stages for free kicks. After the match between the Sydney Swans and the West Coast Eagles at Domain Stadium, Goodes stepped down from playing as he believed the sustained booing had racist overtones. Whilst there were several commentators arguing that the booing was not due to racism, the AFL community including clubs and players and political and community leaders stated that the booing had to cease as it was racist.
Tennis	2015	During a match at the Montreal Masters in August, Nick Kyrgios caused controversy when he was heard making sexual remarks about Stan Wawrinka's girlfriend, Croatian tennis player Donna Vekić, suggesting that Thanasi Kokkinakis had an affair with her. Kyrgios later received a suspended $25,000 fine and a 28-day suspension from the ATP World Tour for the offence.
Rugby league	2016	Parramatta Eels salary cap breach resulted in the National Rugby League stripping the Eels of the twelve competition points the club in the 2016 NRL season, fining the club $1 million, cancelling the registrations of five senior officials and revoking its 2016 NRL Auckland Nines title.
Cricket	2018	2018 Australian ball-tampering scandal – Ball tampering by the Australia national cricket team. Cameron Bancroft was charged with alleged ball tampering on 24 March 2018 when videos showing him rubbing and then concealing a suspicious yellow object emerged during day three of the third test against South Africa, at Newlands Stadium. Captain Steve Smith and Cameron Bancroft accepted the ball tampering allegation in front of Andy Pycroft, the match referee, and press.
Australian rules football	2018	Greater Western Sydney player Jeremy Cameron became the first player in AFL history to be sent straight to the tribunal more than once in his career when he was reported for, and subsequently convicted of, rough conduct against Brisbane Lions fullback Harris Andrews; he was suspended for five matches for the incident. He had previously been sent straight to the tribunal after breaking Rhys Mathieson's jaw during a pre-season match in 2016, for which he was suspended for four matches.
Rugby union	2019	On 17 May 2019, Rugby Australia terminated Israel Folau's 4-year employment contract with the NSW Waratahs and the Wallabies due to him breaching its code of conduct in relation to social media. After legal proceedings involving the Fair Work Commission and the Federal Circuit Court of Australia, on 4 December 2019 Folau and Rugby Australia issued a joint statement and apology that stated no harm had been intended by either party and announced that a confidential settlement had been reached.
Sports facilities	2019–2020	Sports rorts affair (2020) – Bridget McKenzie, Minister for Sport, reminiscent of a very similar scandal 26 years earlier, this time by the governing Coalition.
Gliding	2020	During the 10th FAI Women's World Gliding Championships at Lake Keepit NSW, the Australian team were found to have accessed the official tracking system to obtain real-time information on their competitors positions bypassing the 15 minute delay referred to in the local rules.
Australian rules football	2020	Sydney Swans player Elijah Taylor was suspended for the remainder of the 2020 AFL season after his partner breached the club's strict quarantine hub by sneaking into his hotel room. This ultimately resulted in no cricket matches featuring the India national cricket team being scheduled for the city of Perth during the 2020–21 Australian cricket summer.
Cricket	2021	Tim Paine resigned as Australian captain after it was revealed he sent an inappropriate image of himself along with several lewd messages exchange between him and a female Cricket Tasmania employee from 2017. Paine took a leave of absence shortly after the story was announced.
Australian rules football	2022	The Hawthorn Football Club were at the centre of an external review into the historical treatment of Aboriginal Australian players within the club over the previous decade. In this review, former Indigenous players at the club alleged mistreatment of them and their families. Figures at the club such as Alastair Clarkson and Chris Fagan were alleged to have orchestrated efforts to isolate the players from family and partners, and in one case even encouraged a pregnancy termination, to achieve on-field results. Both Clarkson and Fagan were cleared of wrongdoing.
Australian rules football	2024	Greater Western Sydney Giants Wacky Wednesday scandal – Several players from the Greater Western Sydney Giants were involved in a post-season scandal which involved the use of distasteful costumes and inappropriate skits. Captain Toby Greene was fined $5,000 for his lack of leadership, Josh Fahey was suspended for four matches, and five other players were suspended for two matches each for their roles in the scandal.

== See also ==
- Category:Australian sportspeople in doping cases
- National Rugby League salary cap breaches
- Racism in sport in Australia
- Rugby union and apartheid
- Drugs in sport in Australia
- Sport in Australia
