= Drugs in the Australian Football League =

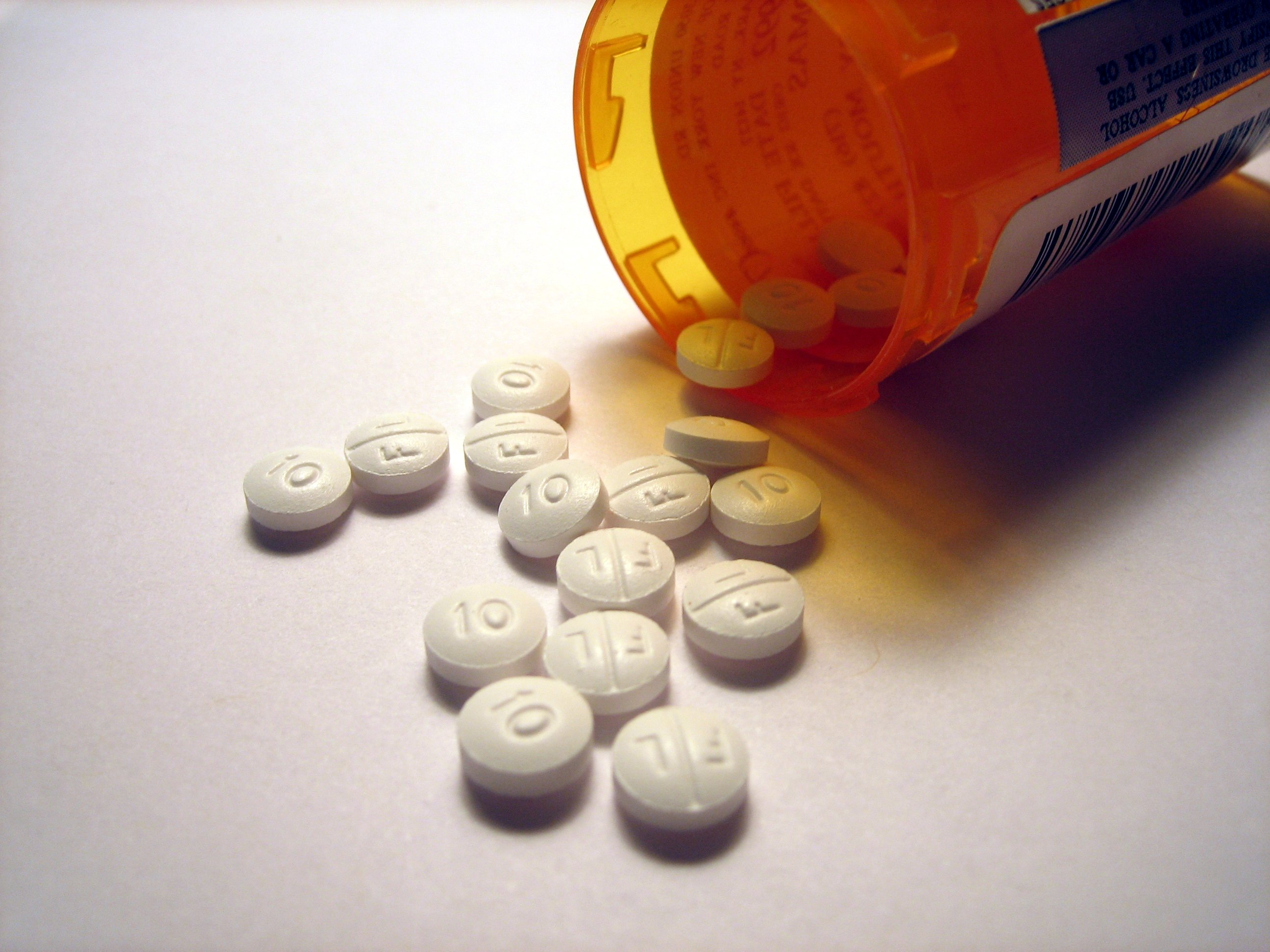

The Australian Football League (AFL) started in 1897 and was originally called the Victorian Football League until its name change in 1990 due to its expansion to other Australian states. AFL is often viewed as an iconic Australian sport which attracts large crowds averaging 35,000 people per game.

Drugs are usually known as a chemical compound that has an effect on a person's body in some way, either physically or psychologically. Drugs specific to elite sports, such as AFL, can include anabolic steroids and stimulants due to their performance-enhancing effects. The consumption of these drugs is known as doping. Doping is the administration of drugs to enhance the performance of a person or athlete. This can create unfair advantages in the game and also could lead to many health risks to the players that are doping. The AFL also has practices in place related to the use of illicit recreational drugs.

== Authority/organisation ==
=== Australian Sports Anti-Doping Authority ===
Australian Sports Anti-Doping Authority (ASADA) was the governing body behind the restriction and regulation of drug use within Australian sporting events and was established in 2006 by the Australian Government. ASADA designed and delivered education and communication programs, detected and managed anti-doping rule violations, conducted anti-doping investigation cases, monitored the compliance of anti-doping policies, and supported athletes to meet their anti-doping obligations.

On July 1, 2020, the functions of the Australian Sports Anti-Doping Authority (ASADA), the National Integrity of Sport (NISU) and the national integrity programs of Sport Australia, were brought together under a new executive agency of the Australian Government called Sport Integrity Australia.

Since commencing operations, Sport Integrity Australia (SIA) has been led by CEO David Sharpe APM, OAM. Sport Integrity Australia reports to the Minister for Sport.

=== World Anti-Doping Agency ===
World Anti-Doping Agency (WADA) is the foundation made by the International Olympic Committee in 1999 and its role is to promote, coordinate and monitor drug use within sports. WADA is responsible for the creation of the World Anti-Doping Code which is adopted by more than 600 sporting organizations. The main tasks that the agency are involved in are research, education, development of anti-doping bodies and regulating the World Anit-Doping Code. Recently, WADA has developed partnerships with pharmaceutical and biotechnology companies with the aim to try to facilitate drug detection methods.

=== AFL policy ===
The AFL is a signatory to ASADA and WADA, and its policy on performance-enhancing drugs is based upon those organisations. For non-performance-enhancing drugs, the AFL currently has a "three-strikes" policy, under which only the player and the club doctor are aware of any positive tests until a third such test is received. After the third strike, the club is made aware of the situation and the player may face disciplinary action. This policy has faced criticism for leniency from anti-doping bodies, particularly the World Anti-Doping Agency (WADA), and as such has attracted much media scrutiny and public debate.

== Incidents ==
=== "Guttergate" ===
On Friday 24 August 2007, the Seven Network broadcast details obtained from players' confidential medical records on its nightly news program. It allegedly purchased these details for $3,000 from a woman who found them in a gutter outside a medical clinic in Melbourne – leading to the nickname "Guttergate" for the incident. The network said that these records contained details of illicit, non-performance-enhancing drug-taking by players at a particular club in the AFL. The name of the club involved was revealed by Seven on air, but not the names of the players. Seven had promised to reveal the names of the players before the end of the program, but since anonymity was guaranteed by the AFL's three-strikes policy, the AFL obtained a court injunction from the Supreme Court of Victoria to suppress the release of the names – this injunction continues to prevent the publication of any part of the records, including any subsequent publication of the name of the club.

At first, Seven vigorously defended its broadcast and stated that it had done so only for the purpose of highlighting the issue of drugs in sport. It challenged the injunction, then faced a backlash both from the AFL and the AFL players themselves. As a result, the players boycotted Seven, refusing to answer any questions posed by its journalists. Seven was not invited to (and, had it still arrived, would have been actively denied entry to) an AFL Players Association (AFLPA) press conference. Faced with possibility of ongoing player boycotts – including a potential boycott of the following month's Brownlow Medal count, which was televised by Seven – the Seven Network issued a statement regretting any harm the broadcast may have caused to the AFL, the clubs and the players, and promised not to broadcast or reveal any of the details of the medical records in future. The AFLPA, which had previously demanded an apology from the network over the incident, said that it understood why Seven could never issue a full apology "for legal reasons" and that it would be taking the "statement of regret" as an apology instead. The player boycott has since been lifted.

The woman who found the medical records and a male accomplice were charged with "theft-by-finding" and faced Heidelberg Magistrates' Court on 6 December 2007. They subsequently pleaded guilty and were sentenced to a 12-month good behaviour bond and ordered to pay the money they received from Channel 7 into a court fund.

=== Essendon supplements controversy ===
The most significant doping scandal in AFL history surrounded the Essendon Football Club and the sports supplements program it ran in the lead-up to and during the 2012 season. Following a long investigation, which began with the club's self-reporting in February 2013, thirty-four Essendon players were found guilty in January 2016 by the Court of Arbitration for Sport of using the banned substance Thymosin beta-4, each receiving a partially backdated two-year suspension which will result in all missing the 2016 AFL season – the decision was subsequently appealed, and was eventually dismissed, by the Federal Supreme Court of Switzerland.

The club faced severe penalties in August 2013 for the poor governance in which the program was run including its lack of documentation and its questionable hiring practices – guilt related to administering a banned substance had not been established at this point – and the club was penalised with a $2 million fine, a loss of high draft picks in the following two drafts, being omitted from the 2013 AFL Finals Series despite finishing seventh on the ladder, and suspensions to key personnel including senior coach James Hird.

=== Ryan Crowley ===
Ryan Crowley was drafted to the Fremantle Football Club in 2002 and played his first AFL game in 2005. He tested positive to a banned substance on match day in the season of 2014. The banned substance was in a painkiller, known as methadone, that he had taken two pills of prior to the game due to back pain. This was not prescribed by the club doctor. He was given a 12-month ban from playing in the AFL but still trained with his team. He became able to play on 25 September 2015, and after being delisted by Fremantle at season's end, joined Essendon as a top-up player due to the club's supplements saga.

=== Ben Cousins ===
Ben Cousins played for the West Coast Eagles and Richmond Football Club in his 12 years of playing AFL. On 16 October 2007, Cousins was arrested in Northbridge, Perth, after police had pulled his vehicle over "due to the manner of his driving". Police searched his car and found quantities of prohibited drugs. Cousins was then sacked by West Coast after serious breaches of his contract with them. In 2009, Cousins joined Richmond to continue his AFL career, but on 12 April Cousins and three other Richmond players were suspended by the club after a drunken altercation in a Sydney hotel. Although Cousins was not intoxicated it was ruled that he had not acted responsibly leading to his suspension for 1 week. A few months later in July, Cousins was admitted to hospital after a severe reaction to the prescribed sleeping pills he had taken. This incident led to the debate of whether legal stimulants (such as caffeine) and legal sedatives (such as sleeping pills) could be used by athletes. The Premier of Victoria, John Brumby, disapproved of their use within sporting events.

=== Ahmed Saad ===
Ahmed Saad played for the St Kilda Football Club after being traded from the Greater Western Sydney Giants in 2011. Two years later in 2013, Saad was delisted from St Kilda after testing positive to a banned stimulant contained in an energy drink which he had taken before a game. He received an 18-month suspension due to the breach of ASADA's regulations. He was redrafted to the Saints in 2014 after serving his suspension and was able to play since February 2015.

=== Josh Thomas and Lachlan Keeffe ===
Lachlan Keeffe (drafted to Collingwood in 2008) and Josh Thomas (drafted to Collingwood in 2009) are the most recent players to breach the anti-doping code. They both tested positive for clenbuterol which led to a 2-year ban as well as a $50,000 fine. The banned substance was detected in their systems after taking illicit drugs during a night out. Both players were banned from playing AFL for 2 years and were delisted by the Collingwood Football Club, before being redrafted by Collingwood in the 2016 Rookie Draft.

== See also ==
- Doping in sport
- Drugs in sport in Australia
- Doping at the Olympic Games
- List of doping cases in sport
