= 2010 rugby league spot-fixing scandal =

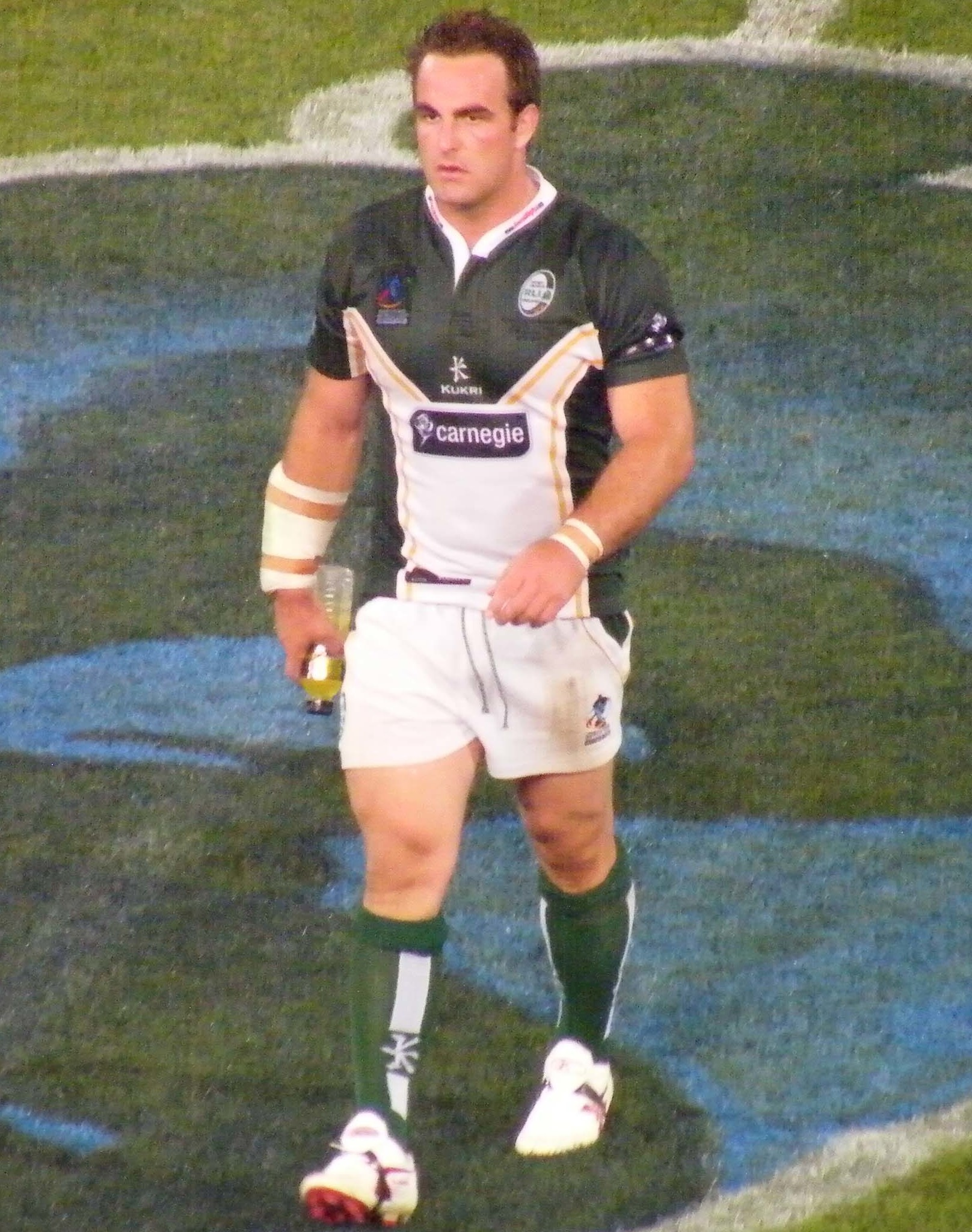
Ryan Tandy pictured in 2008.

The 2010 rugby league spot-fixing scandal refers to allegations that rugby league player Ryan Tandy attempted to manipulate the first scoring method of an Australian National Rugby League (NRL) match between the Canterbury-Bankstown Bulldogs and the North Queensland Cowboys on 21 August 2010.

Canterbury-Bankstown player Tandy was found guilty of spot-fixing under a broad fraud charge. Within the opening minutes of the match, Tandy gave possession to North Queensland by dropping the ball, and then deliberately conceded a penalty to allow North Queensland the option to take a place kick at goal, known as a penalty goal. The intended spot-fix did not eventuate as North Queensland chose not to attempt the penalty goal and instead scored a try moments later. The expected payout was reported to be approximately $250,000.

Charges against several others who placed bets on the Cowboys penalty goal option, including Tandy's manager Sam Ayoub and John Elias, were dismissed.

== Match ==
The spot-fixing scandal occurred during the 2010 NRL season in the round 24 fixture between the North Queensland Cowboys and Canterbury-Bankstown Bulldogs on Saturday, 21 August 2010. The match was played at the former's home ground, Dairy Farmers Stadium, in Townsville, Queensland. Ryan Tandy was playing in the prop forward position for the Canterbury-Bankstown club. Prior to the match, the teams were placed 13th and 15th, respectively, of 16 teams on the NRL ladder. Both teams were mathematically unable to qualify for the finals series.

The Cowboys kicked-off the match and the Bulldogs took possession of the ball. Tandy, being one of two prop forwards for Canterbury, took the first hit-up towards the approaching Cowboys defenders. After being tackled, Tandy stood up and attempted to play the ball under his foot, but fumbled the ball, prompting the match referees to award a scrum feed to the Cowboys. From the scrum, the Cowboys attacked for two hit-ups towards their left hand side of the field. On the third tackle play, the Cowboys passed the ball back towards the centre of the field, where Ryan Tandy and Michael Ennis made a tackle on Grant Rovelli. Tandy remained on top of Rovelli for several seconds after completing the tackle, prompting referee Jason Robinson to award a penalty in the Cowboys' favour. (Note: Referee Jason Robinson gave evidence recounting how the start of the match unfolded. The following are direct quotes from Robinson's testimony: "I can say that I recall that Ryan Tandy dropped the ball in the first 'play the ball' of the game. As a result of that happening I awarded a 'scrum' with a Cowboy's "feed". The Cowboys gained possession of the ball as a result of that play and during that set of six tackles, Tandy and two other bulldog players were involved in a tackle. The Bulldogs players took a long time to get off the tackled player. As a result I awarded a penalty to the Cowboys. How a penalty is taken is an option for the team awarded the penalty. At the time the Cowboys were in about the 10m range from the Bulldogs goal line and just to the left of the goal posts. I think it was Anthony Watts from the Cowboys side who had the ball at the time the penalty was to be taken. I saw that he elected to tap the ball with his foot and play on. As far as I can recall there was no liaising between the team members prior to Anthony playing on. As a result of this play, the Cowboys retained possession and made ground, enabling them to score a try. This was the first score of the game."; "On a penalty they can kick the ball forward and into touch, so out of play, which gives them an extra 20, 30, 40 metres down the field. Given that this was near the goal line, they'd have to kick it further across the field than down the field to gain any advantage. So there's no reason for that. Depending on - the different teams have different tactics. Some teams elect to take any points that are on option. So they would take a kick for goal. In that situation, given the way the defence was set up, a tap was probably a fair option as well.")

Considering the location of the penalty given in the opening minutes of the match, several NRL teams, depending on their preferred tactics, may have taken the option to kick a penalty goal. However, in this instance, the Cowboys' player Anthony Watts, seemingly acting without consulting any of his teammates, opted to resume play immediately, catching the Bulldogs' defenders unprepared, and ultimately passing the ball to Ty Williams to score a try. Williams' try was the first scoring act of the match.

The match finished in a 22–20 point victory for the Bulldogs. There was no suggestion that any other aspect of the match, including the final result, had been manipulated in any way.

No other players in the match were linked to the spot-fix. The Sunday Telegraph noted that both Watts and Williams, who caused the spot-fix to fail, were also clients of Ayoub.

== Criminal investigations ==
Leading up to the match, several Australian bookmakers observed a number of large bets on the first scoring method being a penalty goal by the Cowboys. Several of these bookmakers closed the betting on this market and privately notified the NRL of the suspicious activity. The Sydney Morning Herald broke the story on 27 August 2010. Gerard Daffy of online bookmaker Sports Alive stated, "It's extremely rare for anyone to seriously back an option like that unless it's bad weather." The New South Wales Police Force launched a formal investigation on 1 September 2010.

Tandy, his manager Sam Ayoub, and John Elias were each arrested and charged over the period of several months in 2011:

- 2 February 2011: Tandy charged with giving false or misleading information to the New South Wales Crime Commission.
- 3 March 2011: Tandy charged with three further counts of giving false or misleading information to the NSW Crime Commission.
- 3 March 2011: Both Ayoub and Elias charged with attempting to obtain financial advantage by deception.
- 26 May 2011: Tandy also charged with attempting to obtain financial advantage by deception.

The four charges against Tandy for giving false or misleading information to the NSW Crime Commission was later reduced to three charges.

=== Ryan Tandy ===
On 6 October 2011 at Downing Centre Local Court in Sydney, Tandy was found guilty of attempting to obtain financial advantage by deception. He was fined $4,000 and placed on a 12-month good behaviour bond.

Magistrate Janet Wahlquist made the following findings of fact:

- Tandy had a $30,070 gambling debt owed to jockey manager John Schell.
- Tandy himself did not place a bet on the 21 August 2010 match.
- In the week prior to the match, Tandy had telephone contact with several people who made substiantial bets on the Cowboys penalty goal option, namely Sam Ayoub, former teammate Hassan Saleh, and Michael Cook.
- Ayoub, Saleh, and Cook in turn had telephone contact with several more people who made the same bet, including John Elias, Ayoub's sons Jai and Liam Ayoub, Brad Murray (another client of Sam Ayoub), and others.
- A total of $31,614.06 was wagered on the Cowboys penalty goal option.

The evidence against Tandy included a statement made to police by reserve grade player Brad Murray (Note: Brad Murray played for the Sydney Roosters in the NRL Under-20s competition in 2010 and transferred to the Parramatta Eels ahead of the 2011 season. Murray was generally referred to as a Parramatta player in media reports during the trials of Tandy, Elias, and Ayoub, however, he had been released from his Parramatta contract in May 2011.) on 8 February 2011. Murray explained that he had placed several bets on the Cowboys penalty goal option following encouragement by his manager, Sam Ayoub, to do so because the game was "set up." Murray's statements were largely unchallenged by Tandy's defence.

On 2 December 2011, Tandy was found guilty of one of three charges of giving false or misleading information to the NSW Crime Commission. The conviction related to evidence given by Tandy about his gambling history with John Schell. On 13 January 2012, Tandy was senteced to a six-month intensive correction order, which includes a good behavior clause, community service, and a curfew.

Appeals against Tandy's respective convictions were dismissed on 19 January 2012 and 11 May 2012.

=== John Elias ===
During Elias' trial, in November 2011, Brad Murray recanted his statement of 8 February 2011 under oath. Contrary to his original statement, Murray claimed Ayoub never told him the game was "set up." The Daily Telegraph commented that police were relying heavily on Murray's original statement.

On 24 November 2011, the charge against John Elias was dismissed by Magistrate Peter Miszalski. Magistrate Miszalski noted that Elias' bets, totalling $5,500, were contained within several multi-leg bets, and was therefore dependent on other outcomes to benefit financially. In dismissing the charges, Magistrate Miszalski stated that "some sort of match fixing had taken place," but that the prosecution may have been more successful if Elias had faced a conspiracy-related charge.

The court also heard evidence during Elias' trial that Joel Caine placed a $200 bet on the Cowboys penalty goal option and had been in telephone contact with Jai Ayoub and Hassan Saleh around that time.

In February 2013, the Director of Public Prosecutions successfully appealed Magistrate Miszalski's decision in the Supreme Court.

A subsequent prosecution against Elias was dismissed on 20 June 2013 due to a lack of evidence. Magistrate Greg Grogin stated that there was no evidence of participation in the planning of the spot-fixing, and that receiving information about a possible spot-fix did not constitute an offence.

=== Sam Ayoub ===
On 9 May 2012, Magistrate Antony Townsend excused Brad Murray from giving evidence in Ayoub's trial as Murray was awaiting trial for the same charge. Murray's lawyer stated, "It may be that [Ayoub's] case fails as a result ... but that's a matter that should have been taken into consideration before the charges against Mr Murray were laid." The charges against Ayoub were subsequently dismissed by Magistrate Townsend on 18 May 2012.

=== Other investigations ===
Investigators questioned Tandy about possible match fixing in the round 15 match involving the Canterbury-Bankstown Bulldogs and the Gold Coast Titans played on 18 June 2010. Although the odds suggested that the Gold Coast were favourites to win, $110,000 of the total $150,000 wagered on the game was in favour of Canterbury. A single $20,000 bet on Canterbury was of particular interest. It is thought that the volume of money backing Canterbury was prompted by rumours that several prominent Gold Coast players would miss the match due to injury, which turned out to be true. Despite the absence of these players, the Gold Coast won the match 25–24.

Suspicion was also cast upon two matches played between the Lebanon and Ireland national teams as part of the 2008 Rugby League World Cup qualifying. The matches were played on 5 November 2006 in Ireland and on 2 November 2007 in England. Both matches ended in draws. The 2006 match included Tandy representing Ireland and Jai Ayoub representing Lebanon. Neither Tandy or Ayoub played in the 2007 match. A police investigation in Australia was dismissed due to "jurisdictional issues."

== Aftermath ==
Tandy's playing contract with the Canterbury-Bankstown Bulldogs was terminated on 18 March 2011. Following Tandy's conviction on 6 October 2011, NRL CEO David Gallop announced that Tandy would receive a life ban from the NRL, pending the outcome of any appeal.

The NRL, in conjunction with bookmakers, announced on 3 June 2011 that first scoring method betting markets would be no longer be offered, nor would betting markets for whether a field goal would be kicked in a match.

Tandy was described as the first person in Australia to be convicted of spot-fixing or match fixing. Tandy was convicted under a broad fraud charge that refers to 'obtaining financial advantange by deception'. (Note: s 192E(1)(b) of the Crimes Act 1900 (NSW).) In 2012, the Parliament of New South Wales introduced specific clauses to the Crimes Act 1900 (NSW) to criminalise match fixing and spot fixing. (Note: s 193H to s 193Q of the Crimes Act 1900 (NSW), introduced by the Crimes Amendment (Cheating at Gambling) Act 2012 (NSW).)
