= Cronulla-Sutherland Sharks supplements saga =

Sports controversy in Australia

The Cronulla-Sutherland Sharks footy supplements saga was a sports controversy which began in 2011. The Cronulla-Sutherland Sharks, a professional rugby league club playing in the National Rugby League (NRL). The NRL later offered all five players a one-year ban, backdated to an effective six-month suspension, if they pleaded guilty to taking a banned substance. Sports scientist Stephen Dank provided sworn testimony about what involvement he had at Cronulla and which Staff and coaches were involved.

Dank publicly admitted to overseeing a regimen that involved the administration of two growth hormone-releasing peptides, CJC-1295 and GHRP-6. Dank has never faced criminal charges in relation to dealing in or administering the aforementioned peptides. Both substances are banned by the World Anti-Doping Code, Dank admits both were injected into Cronulla players.

== Drug injections ==
The admission is significant, both for the 12 players who pleaded guilty claiming they had no knowledge of what they were given and for five players who refused the Australian Sports Anti-Doping Authority’s plea deal and were waiting for their cases to be resolved.

Central figures in the Cronulla saga entered the witness box — head coach and head of the football department Shane Flanagan, head trainer and close friend of Flanagan Mark Noakes, former club doctor David Givney, physiotherapist Konrad Schultz, high-performance manager Trent Elkin and football manager Darren Mooney

The Cronulla players were introduced to Stephen Dank by Shane Flanagan, Mark Noakes and Trent Elkin and told to work with him and trust him. They were given false assurances by Dank, Flanagan and Elkin about the substances they were given and that they were permitted for use in sport.

Dank told the court that every week he had provided Elkin with a list of all the treatments administered. “I suspect the records were there, like I left at every football club,’’ he said. Elkin said no such records were kept. Dank’s work at Cronulla was loosely managed and undocumented.

When Givney asked for details about what the players were given, he received a vague reply about amino acids and vitamins. Givney raised concern with Shane Flanagan regarding the practices of Dank however he was dismissed and eventually stood back and accepted the practices. The similarity with how Dank operated at Essendon a year later is striking. The process had serious ramifications and adverse effects on the football club as a whole. A number of senior staff were either dismissed or resigned, matches were played at a sub-par standard as players were physically, emotionally and socially affected, and it partially played a role in the club winning the wooden spoon in 2014. Several senior club members, including senior coach Shane Flanagan and trainer Trent Elkin, received penalties and suspensions. Darren Mooney is no longer registered to be involved with the sport.

Senior staff no longer at the club due to the controversy include Damian Irvine (former chairman) who stood down on learning of the malpractice and process failings of Flanagan and his off-field team, Bruno Cullen (former CEO), Darren Mooney (former football manager), Mark Noakes (head trainer) and Trent Elkin (former club trainer), among others.

Shane Flanagan's suspension expired on 31 October 2014, whilst Trent Elkin is not allowed to work at another NRL club as part of his punishment.

== Background ==
In February 2013, the Cronulla-Sutherland Sharks were implicated in the Australian Crime Commission (ACC)'s report "Organised Crime and Drugs in Sport". The club conducted its own investigation into allegations of illegal performance-enhancing substance use but also awaited findings from Australian Sports Anti-Doping Authority (ASADA)'s investigation. This came a week after the AFL's Essendon Football Club asked ASADA to investigate concerns over the club's possible use of prohibited supplements during the 2012 AFL season.

In the wake of the report by the ACC, the Sharks then launched an investigation into a brief period of their 2011 season, and afterward claimed that none of its players had illegally taken any performance-enhancing drugs during that season. Shane Flanagan and Darren Mooney made statements to the board of the club that Stephen Dank had no involvement or contact with players during a short period of time in 2011. The board launched an investigation to verify those statements however Flanagan and Mooney retracted them and altered their story 3 days after the investigation was launched. This led to the sacking of Mooney and suspension of Flanagan by the Board and the resignation of Chairman Damian Irvine who was let down by the two men he employed who lied to him.

In March, it was revealed that up to 14 unnamed Sharks players were interviewed by ASADA in relation to the distribution of banned substances during the aforementioned 2011 season. They were offered a voluntary six-month ban if they pleaded guilty to unknowingly being administered with a banned substance as they were told by Stephen Dank that they were being administered "vitamins and amino acids", but if found guilty they would have risked a maximum two-year ban from the sport. Afterwards, just two days before the club's season-opening match against the Gold Coast Titans, head coach Shane Flanagan was suspended indefinitely pending the investigation by ASADA. At the same time, former Brisbane Broncos CEO Bruno Cullen was hired by the club as its interim CEO.

== Timeline of events ==
- 12 February 2013: The Cronulla-Sutherland Sharks are among six clubs named in the Australian Crime Commission (ACC)'s report "Organised Crime and Drugs in Sport". Shane Flanagan and Darren Mooney advise club officials that the club had nothing to worry about as Dank was not involved with any players and had no contact with players during a short time at the club in 2011
- 13 February 2013: The club launches an investigation into their 2011 season, in which the club denies distributing any illegal performance-enhancing substances to its players.
- 15 February 2013: Shane Flanagan retracts his initial statement and tells Cronulla Board that he stopped the practices after a few weeks once he realised Dank was injecting players
- 6 and 7 March 2013: Up to 14 unnamed Sharks players named in ASADA's report into the club's supplements program are offered a six-month ban by the governing body, but all declined.
- 8 March 2013: Head coach Shane Flanagan is suspended indefinitely by the club as the investigation into the club's supplements program continues. Peter Sharp takes the reins of the club during this period. Mark Noakes, David Givney, Konrad Schultz and Darren Mooney are sacked by the club for their knowledge and involvement in the program
- 10 March 2013: The Sharks win their opening game of the 2013 NRL season, defeating the Gold Coast Titans by 12–10 with Sharp in the coaches box.
- 13 March 2013: Chairman Damian Irvine quits as the club's chairman.
- 22 March 2013: Flanagan is reinstated as head coach of the Sharks.
- 29 April 2013: Wade Graham is among the first of many Sharks players to be interviewed by ASADA, however, he causes a major controversy by attending the interview in casual attire. All further scheduled interviews are postponed for the remainder of the week.
- 13 May 2013: Interviews between ASADA and the players implicated in the report resume.
- 9 August 2013: Graham is interviewed for a second time three months after the aforementioned interview prompted investigators to postpone the inquiry into the Sharks by the same amount of time. He was the last of five Sharks players to be interviewed that week.
- 23 August 2013: Sharks captain Paul Gallen is the last of eleven players to be interviewed by ASADA.
- 21 November 2013: ASADA's investigation into the Cronulla supplements use is completed, however this is not made public.
- 17 December 2013: The NRL announce a series of penalties upon the club, which included the 12-month suspension of Shane Flanagan as head coach, a $1,000,000 fine (with $400,000 suspended) and the deregistration of Trent Elkin as the club's trainer.
- 20 August 2014: Several past and present Sharks players, notably those from the club's 2011 season, and five members of the current squad, are issued show cause notices and offered a playing ban of up to 12 months, backdated to 21 November 2013.
- 22 August 2014: The players in question, involving captain Paul Gallen and Gold Coast Titans prop Luke Douglas, among others, accept their bans but due to the backdating of them, will miss at least the remainder of the 2014 season only. For Douglas, it ended his record of 215 consecutive games from his NRL debut.
- 30 September 2014: WADA announces in statement that it will not appeal the bans, in part due to delays not attributable to the players.
- 31 October 2014: Shane Flanagan's suspension is lifted by the NRL.
- 8 March 2016: Five Cronulla players who were not part of the group which accepted suspensions in August 2014 were issued violation notices related to the program.
- 12 October 2016: The aforementioned five players receive expired, backdated bans.

== Outcomes ==
On 17 December 2013, following more than nine months of investigations into the Sharks' supplements program, NRL CEO David Smith announced the following provisional penalties:

- A 12-month ban for head coach Shane Flanagan, effective immediately, with a possible reduction by three months pending further conditions as determined by the NRL;
- A $1,000,000 fine for the club, with $400,000 suspended if the club could satisfy several governance conditions; and
- The deregistration of Trent Elkin as the club's trainer in addition to an indefinite ban from the NRL.

Flanagan and Elkin both lodged their appeals to the findings in early 2014, but both were dismissed and their suspensions stood. At the time, no players or other club officials were officially implicated in the findings, however, on 20 August 2014, several players, notably those from the club's 2011 season and five players from the current squad, were issued show cause notices offering them twelve-month bans backdating to 21 November 2013 if they admitted to taking illegal substances during the 2011 season. Without hesitation, most of these players accepted the bans, including captain Paul Gallen; for the former, it ruled him out of the upcoming 2014 Rugby League Four Nations tournament at the end of the season.

The players who were issued the show cause notices by ASADA under the politician Peter Dutton who is Sports Minister, and subsequently banned, were:

- Paul Gallen
- Nathan Gardner
- Wade Graham
- Anthony Tupou
- Jeremy Smith
- Luke Douglas
- Albert Kelly
- Kade Snowden
- Matthew Wright

It was later announced by the National Rugby League that each of the players implicated in the supplements scandal would be barred from receiving awards at the 2014 Dally M Awards ceremony in September; in addition, captain Paul Gallen was also ruled ineligible for the Brad Fittler Medal for being the best performed New South Wales player during their victorious State of Origin series campaign.

Five players further players alleged to have been involved in the program, but who were not part of the group which admitted guilt and accepted suspensions in 2014, were issued violation notices by the NRL on 8 March 2016. These players were: Colin Best, Paul Aiton, Ben Pomeroy, John Williams and Stuart Flanagan. All five pleaded guilty, and were given twelve month suspensions; but, with backdating caused in part by the delays in prosecuting the case, the suspensions had already expired.

== See also ==
- Essendon Football Club supplements saga
- Drugs in sport in Australia
- List of Australian sports controversies
- List of doping cases in sport (C)
- List of sporting scandals
