= Steroid use in Australia =

Anabolic/androgenic steroids are drugs that are obtained from the male hormone, testosterone. Anabolic steroids are used for muscle-building and strength gain for cosmetic reasons as well as for performance-enhancement in athletics and bodybuilding. Anabolic steroids work in many ways by increasing protein synthesis in the muscles and by eliminating the catabolic process (the process of breaking down skeletal muscle for energy). It is common for teens and adults to use steroids as they stimulate and encourage muscle growth much more rapidly than natural body building.

== Statistics ==
In Australia, many people are encouraged to use steroids due to the body image expectations created by society. In secondary schools, 3.2% of boys and 1.2% of girls are using steroids. Many Australian bodybuilders visit Bangkok and Pattaya in Thailand because the pharmacies there sell some steroid brands ten times cheaper than they available on the Australian black market. Australians were also purchasing their steroids in other countries to avoid a possible criminal record at home. Australian Crime Commission statistics have shown that there was a 106% increase in the last financial year of "performance and image-enhancing-drugs", showing 5,561 border detections.

== Notable events ==
In the first 3 months of 2008, 300 AAS seizures were reported by the Australian Customs and Border Protection Service.

== See also ==
- Drugs in sport in Australia
