= 2014 Dally M Awards =

- Date: 29 September
- Location: The Star Sydney
- Hosted by: Matthew Johns
- Dally M Medal: Jarryd Hayne; Johnathan Thurston

Television/radio coverage
- Network: Fox Sports

The 2014 Dally M Awards were presented on Monday 29 September 2014 at Sydney's Star Casino. Broadcast on Fox Sports, the awards ceremony was hosted by Matthew Johns. They are the official annual awards of the National Rugby League and are named after Dally Messenger. The Dally M Medal was awarded to Jarryd Hayne and Johnathan Thurston in a tie of votes, making it the first time for the medal to be awarded to joint winners.

== Judges ==
The 13 judges for the 2014 Dally M's were:

Fox Sports: Greg Alexander, Gary Belcher and Ben Ikin

Channel 9: Brad Fittler, Andrew Johns and Wally Lewis

Sky NZ: Daryl Halligan

The Daily Telegraph: Paul Crawley, Paul Kent, Josh Massoud, Dean Ritchie, Barry Toohey and Nick Walshaw

== Dally M Medal ==
Player votes tally – Top 10
Points	Player
32	Johnathan Thurston
32	Jarryd Hayne
29	Sam Burgess
28	Gareth Widdop
28	Ben Hunt
23	Daly Cherry-Evans
19	Matt Moylan
19	Cameron Smith
19	Kieran Foran
19	Chris Sandow

== Dally M Awards ==
The Dally M Awards are, as usual, conducted at the close of the regular season and hence do not take games played in the finals series into account. The Dally M Medal is for the official player of the year while the Provan-Summons Medal is for the fans' of "people's choice" player of the year.

Award	Player
Provan-Summons Medal	Johnathan Thurston
Peter Moore Award for Rookie of the Year	Luke Brooks
Captain of the Year	Jamie Lyon
Representative Player of the Year	Jarryd Hayne
Coach of the Year	Ivan Cleary
Top Tryscorer of the Year	Jarryd Hayne – 20
Top Pointscorer of the Year	Johnathan Thurston – 208
Peter Frilingos Memorial Award for Headline Moment of the Year	New South Wales winning the State of Origin series.
Holden Cup Player of the Year	Kane Elgey

Team of the Year

Award	Player
Best Fullback	Jarryd Hayne
Best Winger	Semi Radradra
Best Centre	Jamie Lyon
Best Five-Eighth	Johnathan Thurston
Best Halfback	Daly Cherry-Evans
Best Lock	Sam Burgess
Best Second-Rower	Beau Scott
Best Prop	James Graham
Best Hooker	James Segeyaro

== Presenters ==
- Russell Crowe
- Gary Sweet
- Lisa Wilkinson
- Wally Lewis
- Jessica Fox
- Cate Campbell
- Bronte Campbell
- Sally Pearson
- Matthew Johns
- Arthur Summons
- Braith Anasta
- Jodi Gordon
- Paul Whittaker

== Cronulla-Sutherland Sharks controversy ==
Each of the players implicated in the Cronulla-Sutherland Sharks supplements scandal were banned from attending, or receiving awards at the 2014 Dally M Awards ceremony in September as a result of the investigation into the club's supplements scandal; captain Paul Gallen was also ruled ineligible for the Brad Fittler Medal for being the best performed New South Wales player during their victorious State of Origin series campaign.

== See also ==
- Dally M Awards
- Dally M Medal
- 2014 NRL season
