= Sam Ayoub =

Australian rugby league and rugby union sports agent

- Occupation: manager

Sam Ayoub is an Australian rugby league manager for players such as Johnathan Thurston and Robbie Farah. He established Ultra Management (Sports) in 1988 where he is still a director.

Ayoub was one of the first player managers in the Australian Rugby League and has been called "one of the game's most powerful." One of his first clients, Adrian Lam, was his former touch football teammate.

In 2005, Ayoub was banned by the Australian Touch Football Association for abusing officials while he was coach of the Australian men's under-20 team. In 2011, he was caught up in an investigation into suspicious betting activity. In March 2011, Ayoub and his client Ryan Tandy were arrested and Ayoub and former player John Elias were charged by police with "attempt to obtain financial advantage by deception" after admitting to betting on his client's game. Tandy was found guilty of match fixing, but the charges against Ayoub were dismissed.

Ayoub was investigated by police again in 2016 after allegations of NRL salary cap breaches by the Parramatta Eels.

In 2019, Ayoub took two former employees to court, alleging they tried to poach 16 of his clients by amending their contracts without his knowledge while working for him. During cross examination, it was revealed that Ayoub sent numerous abusive and harassing messages to his former employees due to this discovery. Ayoub won the case.
