= List of doping cases in sport (C) =

This is a sub-list from List of doping cases in sport representing a full list of surnames starting with C.

Name	Country	Event	Banned substance(s)	Reference(s)
Javier Cabanas	Spain	Swimming	Epehedrine	
Enos Cabell	United States	Baseball	Cocaine	
Everth Cabrera	Nicaragua	Baseball	Performance-enhancing drugs	
Melky Cabrera	Dominican Republic	Baseball	Testosterone	
Danny Cadamarteri	England	Football (soccer)	Ephedrine	
Cai Huijue	China	Swimming	Triamterene	
Valeriu Calancea	Romania	Weightlifting	Methandienone	
Nick Calathes	Greece	Basketball	Tamoxifen	
Michael Callens	Belgium	Swimming	Cannabis	
Filippo Calorosi	Italy	Tennis		
Robinson Canó	Dominican Republic	Baseball	Furosemide	
Brad Cardinal	Canada	Wrestling	THC	
Jerome Cazenave	France	Water polo	Cannabis	
Oscar Camenzind	Switzerland	Cycling	Erythropoietin (EPO)	
Mike Cameron	United States	Baseball	Stimulants	
Ken Caminiti	United States	Baseball	Anabolic steroids (never sanctioned; admitted to use after the end of his career)	
Miguel Cammacho	Venezuela	Weightlifting	Metandienone	
Neil Campbell	England	Cycling	HCG	
Guillermo Cañas	Argentina	Tennis	Hydrochlorothiazide	
José Canseco	United States	Baseball	Anabolic steroids (never sanctioned; admitted to use after the end of his career)	
Ludovic Capelle	Belgium	Cycling	Erythropoietin (EPO)	
Dean Capobianco	Australia	Athletics	Stanozolol	
Ivan Caprari	Italy	Water polo	Cocaine	
Nuno Cardoso	Angola	Swimming	Nandrolone	
Salvador Carmona	Mexico	Football (soccer)	Steroids	
Alicia Carratero	Spain	Diving	Cannabis	
Danilo Carrega	Brazil	Swimming	Stanozolol	
Anthony Carter	United Kingdom	Lawn tennis	Cannabis	
Stefano Casagranda	Italy	Cycling		
Francesco Casagrande	Italy	Cycling	Testosterone	
Morales Castillo	Costa Rica	Cycling	GW501516	
Welington Castillo	Dominican Republic	Baseball	Erythropoietin	
Enrico Catalano	Italy	Swimming	THC metabolites	
Pietro Caucchioli	Italy	Cycling		
Rupeni Caucaunibuca	Fiji	Rugby union	Cannabis	
Greg Cavanagh	Canada	Cycling	Testosterone	
Deniss Čerkovskis	Latvia	Modern pentathlon	Anabolic steroid	(in Latvian)
Francisco Cervelli	Venezuela	Baseball	Performance-enhancing drugs	
Sergo Chakhoyan	Australia	Weightlifting	Stanozolol	
Rajib Chakraborty	India	Swimming	Attempted tampering of sample	
Paul Champalbert	France	Swimming	Cannabis	
Wilson Chandler	United States	Basketball	Ipamorelin	
Chang Tai-shan	Chinese Taipei	Baseball		
Sanamacha Chanu	India	Weightlifting	Furosemide	
Maxime Chaply	France	Swimming	Cannabis	
Justin Charles	Australia	Australian rules football	Boldenone	
Mikalai Charniak	Belarus	Weightlifting	Mesterolone	
Julio Cesar Chavez Jr.	Mexico	Boxing	Diuretics (2010) Cannabis (2012)	
Michael Chavis	United States	Baseball	Dehydrochlormethyltestosterone	
Zuraini Che Rose	Malaysia	Weightlifting	Metandienone	
Cristiana Checchi	Italy	Shot put	Doping	
Juan Ignacio Chela	Argentina	Tennis	Metil-testosterone	
Chen Ganfen	China	Swimming		
Shiyun Chen	China	Swimming	Prednisone	
Chen Sijia	China	Swimming	Clenbuterol	
Ruth Chepng'etich	Kenya	Athletics	Hydrochlorothiazide	
Alexei Cherepanov	Russia	Ice hockey	Nikethamide	
Chen Po-Pu	Chinese Taipei	Weightlifting	Methandienone	(in German)
Watsana Chianram	Thailand	Weightlifting	Methandienone	
Viktor Chislean	Moldova	Weightlifting		
Ji-man Choi	South Korea	Baseball	Methandienone	
Velichko Cholakov	Bulgaria	Weightlifting	Steroids	
Elais Christoforou	Cyprus	Swimming	Ephedrine	
Traian Cihărean	Romania	Weightlifting		
César Cielo	Brazil	Swimming	Furosemide	
Marin Čilić	Croatia	Tennis	Nikethamide	
Anatoli Ciricu	Moldova	Weightlifting		
Velichko Cholakov	Bulgaria	Weightlifting	Metandienone	
Emmanuel Clase	Dominican Republic	Baseball	Boldenone	
Roger Clemens	United States	Baseball	Anabolic steroids	
Clemence Clerc	France	Water polo	Prednisone & Prednisolone	
Madga Cojom	Guatemala	Weightlifting		
Chris Colabello	United States	Baseball	Dehydrochlormethyltestosterone	
Julien Colchen	France	Water polo	Terbutaline	
Kleon Coleman	Belize	Volleyball	Hydrochlorothiazide, Chloraminophenamide	
John Collins	United States	Basketball	GHRP-2	
Alex Colomé	Dominican Republic	Baseball	Boldenone	
Bartolo Colón	Dominican Republic	Baseball	Testosterone	
Joe Colón	Puerto Rico	Baseball	Non-performance-enhancing drug	
Carolina Colorado	Colombia	Swimming	Sibutramine	
James Comben	England	Rugby union	Methylhexanamine	
Gloria Comerma	Spain	Field hockey		
Alberto Contador	Spain	Cycling	Clenbuterol	
David Cookson	United Kingdom	Rugby	Methylhexaneamine	
Chris Cooper	United States	American football	THG	
Kit Cope	United States	Mixed martial arts	Boldenone	
Guillermo Coria	Argentina	Tennis	Nandrolone	
Chris Cornes	England	Football (soccer)	Cocaine	
Alizé Cornet	France	Tennis	Missed tests (later cleared due to misconduct by doping officer)	
Alejandro Cortes Gonzalez	Chile	Weightlifting	Dimethylpentylamine	
Leonardo Costa	Brazil	Swimming	Stanozolol	
Humberto Cota	Mexico	Baseball	Performance-enhancing drug	
Ben Cousins	Australia	Australian rules football	Methamphetamine (admitted to a U.S. rehab for treatment)	
Fernando Couto	Portugal	Football (soccer)	Nandrolone	
Alexander Crispim	Brazil	Mixed martial arts	Desoxymethyltestosterone	
Cronulla-Sutherland Sharks (eleven players)	Australia	rugby league	Various supplements	
Brayden Crossley	Australia	Australian rules football	Cocaine	
Ryan Crowley	Australia	Australian rules football	Methadone	
Francisco Cruceta	Dominican Republic	Baseball	Unspecified performance-enhancing substance (2007), stanozolol (2011)	
Nelson Cruz	Dominican Republic	Baseball	Performance-enhancing drugs	
Rafael Cruz	Dominican Republic	Baseball	Stanozolol	
Kevin Cruz Soto	Chile	Weightlifting	Dimethylpentylamine	
Brian Cushing	United States	American football	hCG	
Baatarsükhiin Chinzorig	Mongolia	Boxing	Metandienone metabolite	
