= Dean Robinson =

Australian fitness coach

Personal information
- Full name: Dean Robinson
- Born: 20 August 1968 (age 58)

Coaching information
Club
Years	Team	Gms	W	D	L	W%
1996–00	York Wasps
- As of 8 October 2022

Dean Robinson (born 9 September 1974) is an Australian fitness coach who has worked with a variety of both AFL and NRL clubs.

Better known as The Weapon, Robinson is notable for his intense training methods which were criticised following a spate of soft-tissue injuries at Essendon in the second half of the 2012 AFL season.

Prior to his work as a professional fitness coach, Robinson showed a passion for rodeo. Acting the position of both a steer wrestler and a rodeo clown, Robinson proved a versatile competitor and went all the way to the World Steer Wrestling Association titles in 1997. He also spent several years training other rodeo athletes, before later branching out into additional sports.

Before his association with a long string of clubs, Robinson worked at the NSW Institute of Sport. His subsequent transition into the NRL was sparked by his brother Trent Robinson, who had been employed in a variety of coaching roles at several clubs. Beginning in 2005, Robinson worked with the Manly Sea Eagles. Spending two years at the club, Robinson implemented a far more scientific approach to training than was previously in place. Robinson’s contribution to the club’s improved performance did not go unnoticed, and in 2006 AFL clubs also began to express interest in his services. This soon culminated in the Geelong Football Club hiring him for the 2007 season.

Robinson left Geelong to join the new Gold Coast Football Club in their inaugural season. After a year there, he moved back to Melbourne and began working for the Essendon Football Club. There he was reunited with Mark Thompson, who was head coach at Geelong during Robinson's time.

In February 2013, Essendon announced that they had reported themselves to Australian Sports Anti-Doping Authority (ASADA) to investigate the possible use of banned substances. Robinson, as the club's fitness boss, was stood down from his position pending the results of the enquiry. His link to Stephen Dank, a controversial sports scientist who was introduced to Essendon by Robinson, was investigated by the AFL. Hinting at further revelations, former ASADA head Richard Ings said "this is not a black day in Australian sport, this is the blackest day."

Following the uproar, a chorus of accredited individuals leap to the defence of the newly embattled fitness coach. Central among these was three-time Geelong premiership player and Norm Smith medalist Paul Chapman. Chapman, shocked at the claims involving Robinson, was highly supportive of the man to whom he attributed much of his own personal success. Speaking highly of his former mentor, Chapman said Robinson was a true "family man" and suggested he had been shamed "simply by association". Denouncing the press gallery, Chapman maintained that a trial by media had left Robinson guilty until proven innocent. Geelong captain Joel Selwood expressed similar admiration for the man, describing Robinson as a "legend of a bloke", while football chief Neil Balme and current Gold Coast captain Gary Ablett also lent their support.

Former Essendon vice-captain Mark McVeigh was similarly forthright in his praise, claiming Robinson's knowledge of the club's fitness program was "squeaky clean". "I can honestly tell you that everything I took I knew 100 per cent that it was within the WADA and AFL doping regulations," McVeigh continued, affirming his belief that Robinson had done nothing wrong.

Following his sacking Robinson began a legal campaign against the club, on the grounds of unfair dismissal.

On Thursday 2 October, Essendon reached a $1 million settlement with Robinson to end his unfair dismissal claim.

A trial had previously been set for 10 November and several high profile figures, such as Andrew Demetriou and Gillon McLachlan, were expected to testify. In court documents Robinson claimed that an Essendon public relations strategy had been formulated to portray himself and Stephen Dank as "rogue operators" during their tenure.
