= List of doping cases in sport (E) =

This is a sub-list from List of doping cases in sport representing a full list of surnames starting with E.

Name	Country	Event	Banned substance(s)	Reference(s)
Sandor Earl	Australia	Rugby league	CJC-1295, Somatropin, Clebuterol, SARMS, Testosterone	
Johannes Eder	Austria	Cross-country skiing	Violation of blood doping rules	
Constantinos Efstathiou	Cyprus	Volleyball	Pseudoephedrine	
Aram Eidipour	Iran	Water polo	MDMA	
Jean-Pierre Élissalde	France	Rugby union	Amphetamines (self-admitted)	
Salameddin Eladhem	Libya	Weightlifting	Metandienone	
Lafrik Elmehdi	Morocco	Weightlifting	Cannabinoids	
Dina Ibrahim El Sayed	Egypt	Swimming	19-Norandrosterone	
M. Amir Mahmoud Elsayed	Egypt	Weightlifting		
Ashrakat Abdel El Shehawy	Egypt	Swimming	Dexamethasone	
Abu Emad Mohd	Jordan	Weightlifting	Stanozolol	
Kent Emanuel	United States	Baseball	Dehydrochlormethyltestosterone	
Bilgin Emine	Turkey	Weightlifting	T/E 21.5	
Mario Encarnación	Dominican Republic	Baseball	Steroids	
Kornelia Ender	East Germany	Swimming	(Self-admitted)	
Derek Eng Hao Lee	Singapore	Water polo	Pseudoephedrine	
Tomáš Enge	Czech Republic	Auto racing	Cannabis	
Ludmila Engquist	Sweden	Bobsledding		
Sébastien Enjolras	France	Auto racing	Cannabis	
Sara Errani	Italy	Tennis	Letrozole	
Sergio Escalona	Venezuela	Baseball	Performance-enhancing drugs	
Nima Esfandari	Iran	Volleyball	Norandrosterone	
Essendon Football Club (34 players)	Australia	Australian rules football	Thymosin beta-4	
Ariana Evangelista	Philippines	Cycling	Erythropoietin	
Dan Evans	United Kingdom	Tennis	Cocaine	
Laurie Evans	England	Cricket		
Tom Evans	United States	Baseball		
Tyreke Evans	United States	Basketball		
Jean-Jacques Eydelie	France	Football (soccer)		(self-admitted)
