= Henry Slattery =

Australian rules footballer

Personal information
- Full name: Henry Slattery
- Born: 22 January 1986 (age 40)
- Original teams: Rostrevor College, West Adelaide (SANFL)
- Draft: No. 46, 2004 National Draft, Essendon
- Height: 185 cm (6 ft 1 in)
- Weight: 86 kg (190 lb)
- Position: Defender

Playing career^{1}
Years	Club	Games (Goals)
2005–2012	Essendon	96 (12)
- ^{1} Playing statistics correct to the end of 2012.

Henry Slattery (born 22 January 1986) is a former professional Australian rules footballer who played for the Essendon Football Club in the Australian Football League (AFL).

Henry Slattery attended Rostrevor College in Adelaide, South Australia. Slattery was recruited by Essendon with selection 46 in the 2004 AFL draft. He had previously played for West Adelaide in the SANFL. He made his debut in 2005 against St Kilda, kicking a goal in what was Matthew Lloyd's 200th AFL game. His first three seasons were limited by hip and knee injuries before he cemented his place in the Essendon starting team, often as a small, lock-down defender or defensive midfielder.

At the end of the 2012 AFL season, Slattery decided to leave Essendon in search of greater opportunities at AFL level, after playing in only 2 games for the year, nominating South Australia as his preferred destination. He was not selected in the 2012 AFL draft, but was recruited by the Port Adelaide Magpies in the South Australian National Football League (SANFL).

Slattery, along with 33 other Essendon players, was found guilty of using a banned performance-enhancing substance, thymosin beta-4, as part of Essendon's sports supplements program during the 2012 season. He and his team-mates were initially found not guilty in March 2015 by the AFL Anti-Doping Tribunal, but a guilty verdict was returned in January 2016 after an appeal by the World Anti-Doping Agency. He was suspended for two years which, with backdating, ended in November 2016; as a result, he served approximately fourteen months of his suspension and missed the entire 2016 season, during which time he had intended to coach Nuriootpa Rovers Football Club in the Barossa Light & Gawler Football League.

Slattery completed a Bachelor of Agricultural Science from the University of Melbourne in late 2010, and also undertook a short course in Wine Appreciation and Making at Armadale Cellars in 2011. In recognition of his success in juggling football and study commitments, Slattery was awarded the AFL Players Association's Education and Training Excellence Award in 2011.

== Statistics ==
Statistics are correct to end of 2012 season.

Season	Team	No.	Games	Totals							Averages (per game)						
Season	Team	No.	Games	G	B	K	H	D	M	T	G	B	K	H	D	M	T
2005	Essendon	34	4	2	0	17	17	34	7	6	0.5	0.0	4.2	4.2	8.5	1.8	1.5
2006	Essendon	20	8	0	1	31	44	75	30	16	0.0	0.1	3.9	5.5	9.4	3.8	2.0
2007	Essendon	20	20	4	3	91	96	187	55	78	0.2	0.2	4.6	4.8	9.4	2.8	3.9
2008	Essendon	20	20	3	2	105	118	223	59	74	0.2	0.1	5.2	5.9	11.2	3.0	3.7
2009	Essendon	20	21	2	3	135	145	280	76	80	0.1	0.1	6.4	6.9	13.3	3.6	3.8
2010	Essendon	20	13	1	1	72	68	140	38	54	0.1	0.1	5.5	5.2	10.8	2.9	4.2
2011	Essendon	20	8	0	1	48	33	81	19	34	0.0	0.1	6.0	4.1	10.1	2.4	4.2
2012	Essendon	20	2	0	0	5	4	9	0	2	0.0	0.0	2.5	2.0	4.5	0.0	1.0
Career			96	12	11	504	525	1029	284	344	0.1	0.1	5.2	5.5	10.7	3.0	2.6

Legend
G	Goals	K	Kicks	D	Disposals	T	Tackles
B	Behinds	H	Handballs	M	Marks
