= Danny Corcoran (sports administrator) =

Australian sports administrator

Thomas Daniel "Danny" Corcoran
- Occupation: Sports Administrator

Thomas Daniel "Danny" Corcoran is an Australian sports administrator, having worked for AFL clubs Essendon (1990–1995, 2010–2013) and Melbourne (1998–2003), and for Athletics Australia (2004–2010). In 2010 he became the inaugural general manager of rugby operations at the Melbourne Rebels.

== Career ==
At Essendon Corcoran was football operations manager 1990–1995. From there he moved to Melbourne, where he was the football manager 1998–2003. He joined Athletics Australia in 2004 to be CEO. In April 2010 he announced he would resign from AA to become the inaugural general manager of rugby operations at the Melbourne Rebels.

About his move to the Rebels Corcoran said: "To help bring rugby into the forefront of people's minds, in one of the greatest sporting cities in the world, in a new stadium, will be a great challenge and one that is potentially very rewarding for all involved. It's a great challenge for us and one I genuinely believe this franchise can achieve." Rebels CEO Brian Waldron added: "Danny is highly experienced, having been involved with successful teams in his history, including AFL side, Essendon." Waldron went on to emphasise Corcoran's expertise in high performance, and then described Danny as a "wonderful addition to the team."

On 4 October 2010, Corcoran resigned as the general manager from the Melbourne Rebels to re-join the Essendon Football Club.

== 2013 supplements controversy ==
Following months of rumours and investigations, on 13 August 2013, Corcoran, along with the Essendon Football Club, senior coach James Hird, senior assistant coach Mark Thompson and club doctor Bruce Reid was charged by the AFL with bringing the game into disrepute in relation to the supplements program at the club in 2011 and 2012. The club was given 14 days to consider the charges and faced an AFL Commission hearing on 26 August 2013. On 27 August 2013, Corcoran was banned for six months with two months of that time suspended for a period of two years; effectively a four-month ban. He cannot work with any AFL club in any capacity during that period.
