= Bruce Reid (doctor) =

Australian doctor and footballer (1946–2020)

Personal information
- Full name: Bruce Malcolm Reid
- Born: 4 April 1946; Melbourne
- Died: 27 October 2020 (aged 74); Melbourne, Victoria, Australia
- Original team: North Balwyn Methodists
- Height: 171 cm (5 ft 7 in)
- Weight: 66 kg (146 lb)
- Position: Midfielder

Playing career^{1}
Years	Club	Games (Goals)
1966–1967	Hawthorn	3 (0)
- ^{1} Playing statistics correct to the end of 1967.

Bruce Malcolm Reid (4 April 1946 – 27 October 2020) was an Australian doctor and former Australian rules footballer. He was the senior medical officer at the Essendon Football Club and played for Hawthorn in the Victorian Football League (VFL).

== Early life and career ==
Reid, who originally played football for the North Balwyn Methodists, played two senior games for Hawthorn in the 1966 VFL season and one further game the following year.

Reid was a member of Preston's 1968 and 1969 Victorian Football Association premiership teams.

Having graduated from university with a medical degree while at Preston, Reid worked as a club doctor with Richmond from 1976 to 1979.

== Essendon Football Club ==
Reid joined Essendon Football club in 1982 shortly after Kevin Sheedy, a player at Richmond, had joined as coach. From this time until his cancer diagnosis in 2018, he served as senior medical officer for Essendon.

=== 2013 supplements saga ===
Following months of rumours and investigations, on 13 August 2013, Reid—along with the Essendon Football Club, senior coach James Hird, senior assistant coach Mark Thompson, and football manager Danny Corcoran—was charged by the AFL with bringing the game into disrepute in relation to the supplements program at the club in 2011 and 2012. The club was given 14 days to consider the charges and face an AFL Commission hearing on 26 August 2013.

On 27 August 2013, the AFL Commission handed down its decision to exclude Essendon from the 2013 finals series and fine it $2 million. James Hird was banned for 12 months, Danny Corcoran suspended for six months, and Mark Thompson fined $30,000, but the case against Reid continued after his decision to fight the charges against him.

On 18 September 2013, 24 hours before Reid was due back in the Supreme Court, the AFL withdrew all 38 charges against him for his role in the supplements scandal, meaning he was free to resume his work at the Essendon Football Club.

== Death ==
Reid was diagnosed with cancer in 2018 and left Essendon after more than 36 years as the club's senior medical officer. On 27 October 2020, Reid died of complications from cancer, aged 74.
