= Sport Integrity Australia =

Sporting regulation agency of the Australian Government

Agency overview
- Formed: 1 July 2020
- Preceding agencies: Australian Sports Anti-Doping Authority; National Integrity of Sport Unit (Department of Health)
- Jurisdiction: Australia
- Agency executive: Sarah Benson, acting Chief Executive Officer
- Key document: Australian Sports Anti-Doping Authority Amendment (Sport Integrity Australia) Act 2020
- Website: sportintegrity.gov.au

Sport Integrity Australia is an executive agency of the Australian Government which commenced operation on 1 July 2020. The agency was established by the Parliament of Australia from the recommendations presented in the Report of the Review of Australia's Sports Integrity Arrangements, completed by the Department of Health.

Sport Integrity Australia combined the operations of the Australian Sports Anti-Doping Authority, the National Integrity of Sport Unit of the Department of Health, and the integrity programs of Sport Australia. The agency focuses on countering prohibited substances and methods, child abuse in sporting environments, unfair manipulation of games, and failures to protect those involved.

== See also ==
- Sports in Australia
- Drugs in sport in Australia
