= Drugs in sport in Australia =

Australia has been at the forefront in the fight against doping in sport. It was one of the first countries to establish a sports anti-doping agency and is a member of World Anti-Doping Agency (WADA). Australia abides by World Anti-Doping Code. In 2010, Australian John Fahey was re-elected as President of WADA for a second and final three-year term which finished at the end of 2013. Australia like other major countries has been embroiled in major doping in sport controversies and issues.

== Administration ==
As a result of the Senate Drugs in Sport Inquiry held 1989–1990, the Australian Government established the Australian Sports Drug Agency through the Australian Sports Drug Agency Act 1990. On 14 March 2006, Australian Sports Anti-Doping Authority (ASADA) replaced the Australian Sports Drug Agency. Besides education and testing, ASADA was given increased powers to conduct investigations, present cases at sporting tribunals, recommend sanctions, and approve and monitor sporting organisations' anti-doping policies. In June 2013, Australian Sports Anti-Doping Authority Amendment Bill 2013 provided ASADA with increased investigation powers. The Bill provided ASADA the right to compel those it believes that have knowledge about doping practice or a specific doping violation to attend an interview and to produce related documents. Failure to cooperate will lead to civil penalties.

Australia has a National Anti-Doping Framework that aligns domestic anti-doping efforts in Australia through a set of agreed principles, alongside clearly identified areas for co-operation between the Australian Government and State and Territory Governments. Members of the Framework are Department of Regional Australia, Local Government, Arts and Sport, Australian Sports Anti-Doping Authority, Australian Sports Commission, State and Territory Governments, national sports organisations, state sporting organisations and professional associations. Other Australian Government agencies that play a role in the Framework include National Measurement Institute, Australian Customs and Border Protection Service, Therapeutic Goods Administration, Australian Federal Police and Australian Crime Commission.

ASADA plays a prominent role in the development of the World Anti-Doping Code

== Testing ==
Royal Brisbane Sports Drug Testing Laboratory was accredited by the International Olympic Committee (IOC) for testing between 1982 and 1987. It ceased testing in 1987 after it failed IOC biennial reaccreditation. It was replaced by the Australian Government Analytical Laboratories now called Australian Sports Drug Testing Laboratory which is a section of the National Measurement Institute. In 2011/12, Australian Sports Anti-Doping Authority conducted 3,996 government‑funded tests across 45 sports and 3,200 user‑pays tests for Australian sporting bodies and other organisations.

== Research ==
The Australian Government allocates funding for scientific and social science anti-doping research through the Anti-Doping Research Program (ADRP). ADRP is funded under the Australian Government's Sport Anti-Doping Program, which also supports Australia's international anti-doping commitments to the WADA and UNESCO. Research into sports doping issues is also undertaken by a range of Australian universities and research findings are published in academic journals and The Conversation website. Science and Industry Against Blood Doping (SIAB) located on the Gold Coast, Queensland is a leader in blood doping research.

== Chronology of doping ==
Chronological listing of major sports doping events and issues in Australian sport. Listing excludes horse racing, harness racing and greyhound racing and does not include individual doping violations.

1977 – Graham Olling, a Parramatta Eels player, admitted to taking a course of anabolic steroids under medical supervision. It was one of the first cases on an Australian athlete admitting to drug use.
1982 – Australian Sports Medicine Federation (ASMF) published the Survey of Drug Use in Australian sport. The three-year survey found that 5 per cent of Australian athletes were major drug users.
1985 – in response to the ASMF Survey, the Australian Government established the National Program on Drugs in Sport under the Australian Sports Commission.
1986 – Australian athletics team manager Maurie Plant at a track and field meeting in Belfast in 1986, asked heptathlete Jane Flemming to provide a substitute urine sample for the javelin thrower Sue Howland, fearing Howland would test positive to an anabolic steroid.
1987 – 30 November – Australian Broadcasting Corporation Four Corners program The Winning Edge discussed the anabolic steroids in health clubs and raised concerns about allegations by Gael Martin and Sue Howland, two former Australian Institute of Sport athletes.
1988 – 19 May – Senate Standing Committee on Environment, Recreation and the Arts established an inquiry on the based on issues arises from the Four Corner's program. The Inquiry examined "the use by Australian sportsmen and sportswomen of performances enhancing drugs and the role played by Commonwealth agencies". Senator John Black was appointed chairman and Senator Noel Crichton-Browne Deputy Chairman of the Inquiry. The Inquiry examined doping allegations relating to track and field and weightlifting at the AIS, powerlifting and professional sports. Two extensive reports were published. The Inquiry was covered heavily by the media.
1988 – Alex Watson, an Australian modern pentathlete, was disqualified and sent home from the 1988 Seoul Olympics after excessive caffeine levels. His ban led to an Australian Parliament Inquiry into the handling of the incident. Watson had his suspension reduced to two years and competed at the 1992 Barcelona Olympics.
1990 – Australian Sports Drug Agency was established. This organisation was a major outcome of the Senate Inquiry and its objectives were to deter the use of banned doping practices in sport through education, testing, advocacy services, and co-ordination of Australia's anti-doping program.
1999 – Australian Sports Commission and ASDA initiated a nationwide drug education and enforcement program through the Tough-on-Drugs-in-Sport policy. This policy was in the wake of the 1998 Tour de France doping scandal.
2000 – August – AIS and Australian Sports Drug Testing Laboratory developed blood test to detect the banned drug erythropoietin (EPO). The IOC approved the test to be used at the 2000 Sydney Olympics in conjunction with a French urine test.
2004 – Australian Sports Commission (ASC) became World Anti-Doping Code (WADA Code) compliant on 1 August 2004. As a result, all ASC funded and recognised national sporting organisations were required to have an ASC compliant anti doping policy by 1 January 2005. The WADA Code included illicit/recreational drugs such as marijuana and cocaine. In 2005, the Australian Football League (AFL') was in dispute with the Australian Government over the AFL's sanctions for illicit/recreational drug use. The AFL preferred a harm minimization rather than a punitive approach.
2004 – Australian Sports Commission and Cycling Australia appointed Justice Robert Anderson to investigate doping allegations concerning the AIS track cycling team based in Adelaide, South Australia. Mark French was banned for two years but in July 2005 the ban was overturned by the Court of Arbitration for Sport due to lack of evidence.
2006 – Australian Sports Anti-Doping Authority (ASADA) replaced the Australian Sports Drug Agency. Besides education and testing, ASADA was given increased powers to conduct investigations, present cases at sporting tribunals, recommend sanctions, and approve and monitor sporting organisations' anti-doping policies.
2007 – 6 October – Australian Government launched its Tough on Drugs illicit drugs in sport policy which provided a voluntary regime for out-of-competition testing for illicit drugs. This policy has generated a great deal of commentary particularly related Australian Football League's three strikes policy.
2012 – October – Australian Sports Anti-Doping Authority instigated an investigation into Australian cycling in light of the United States Anti-Doping Agency's investigation into the US Postal Service Pro Cycling Team and Lance Armstrong. The investigation lead to Matthew White and Stephen Hodge to admitting to doping during their careers.

Despite being prohibited substances in professional sport, peptides and hormones are being used by professional athletes in Australia, facilitated by sports scientists, high performance coaches and sports staff.

— Key Findings in Organised Crime And Drugs in Sport, 2013.

2013 – February – Australian Crime Commission released report titled Organised Crime And Drugs in Sport. The investigation identified widespread use of prohibited substances including peptides, hormones and illicit drugs in professional sport that was facilitated by sports scientists, high-performance coaches and sports staff. Essendon Football Club from the Australian Football League and six National Rugby League Canberra Raiders, Cronulla Sutherland Sharks, Newcastle Knights, Manly-Warringah Sea Eagles, North Queensland Cowboys, Penrith Panthers teams were implicated after of the report. ASADA is currently investigating possible doping violations from the report.
2013 – 11 February – Australian Olympic Committee required Australian athletes to sign statutory declarations saying they have no history of doping in sport. There will be penalty of up to five years imprisonment for those providing false declarations.
2013 – June – Australian Sports Anti-Doping Authority Amendment Bill 2013 was passed and its main aim is to compel persons of interest to assist ASADA's investigations. The Australian Greens Party's amendments resulted in interviewees having the right to remain silent and to be accompanied by a lawyer during interviews.
2013 – August – Essendon Football Club supplements saga. The Australian Football League (AFL) severely penalised the Essendon Football Club after Australian Sports Anti Doping Authority (ASADA) and AFL joint investigation found issues with its supplements program. The AFL found that Essendon had brought the AFL into disrepute and handed down severe penalties – $2 million fine, suspension from the 2013 finals series, removal of first round drafts picks and penalties to Essendon football department officials including the one-year suspension to Head Coach James Hird. Sandor Earl, National Rugby League player, became the first athlete issued with an infraction notice as a result of the ACC report.
2013 – December – Cronulla-Sutherland Sharks supplements saga. The NRL announced a series of penalties upon the club, which included the 12-month suspension of Shane Flanagan as head coach, a $1,000,000 fine (with $400,000 suspended) and the deregistration of Trent Elkin as the club's trainer.
2014 – November – Australian Sports Anti-Doping Authority Amendment Bill 2014 was passed. This amendment ensured that Australia's anti-doping legislation was aligned with the revised World Anti-Doping Code that will come into force on 1 January 2015. There was a Senate Inquiry into the legislation that focused on ASADA working more closely with police and intelligence agencies, banning athletes from working with sports professionals involved in doping and increasing first offence bans from two to four years. Australian Athletes' Alliance representing professional athletes argued against the changes.
2015 – March The AFL Anti-Doping Tribunal announces that all 34 past and present Essendon players were found not guilty of using a banned supplement. In April, ASADA announces that it will not appeal the AFL Anti-Doping Tribunal's ruling finding all 34 past and present Essednon players not guilty. In May, WADA announces it will appeal the tribunal's not guilty decision to the Court of Arbitration for Sport.
2015 – August – Collingwood Football Club players Josh Thomas and Lachlan Keeffe accepted two year doping bans for taking clenbuterol. Players were each fined $50,000 and delisted. The players admitted that clenbuterol probably entered their body whilst taking illicit drugs. This case brought into question the AFL's illicit drugs policy based on harm minimization.
2016 – January – Court of Arbitration for Sport (CAS) found in WADA's favour and overturned the not-guilty verdict in the Essendon Football Club supplements saga. The thirty-four Essendon players were suspended for two years backdated to 31 March 2015; including time served in provisional suspensions during the 2014/15 offseason, this will bring the suspensions for almost all of the players to an end in November 2016. In October, the Swiss Federal Tribunal dismissed the Essendon players appeal against the CAS decision made in January.

== Doping cases ==
Australian Sports Anti-Doping Authority website lists Australian athletes with doping violations. Australian sportspeople in doping cases lists prominent Australian athletes involved in doping cases. Athletes competing in Olympics sports found guilty of taking performance-enhancing drugs include Nathan Baggaley (canoeing), Gael Martin (athletics) and Martin Vinnicombe (cycling) and professional sports Rodney Howe (rugby league), Reni Maitua (rugby league) and Justin Charles (AFL). High-profile professional athletes Andrew Johns (rugby league) and Ben Cousins (AFL) have admitted to the use of illicit drugs during their playing careers.

== See also ==
- Cronulla-Sutherland Sharks supplements saga
- Drugs in the Australian Football League
- Essendon Football Club supplements saga
- List of Australian sports controversies
- Steroid use in Australia
