= John Elias (rugby league) =

Lebanese-Australian professional rugby league footballer and coach

Personal information
- Born: 10 December 1963 (age 62) Beirut, Lebanon

Playing information
- Position: Second-row
Club
Years	Team	Pld	T	G	FG	P
1983	Newtown	1	0	0	0	0
1984	South Sydney	4	0	0	0	0
1985	Souths (Brisbane)
1986	Canterbury-Bankstown	11	0	0	0	0
1986–87	Western Suburbs	28	6	0	0	24
1988–89	Eastern Suburbs	16	1	0	0	4
1989–94	Balmain Tigers	67	7	0	0	28
1992–93	Leigh	16	2
1994–95	South Sydney	9	0	0	0	0
1996–97	Avignon	13	1
	Toulouse Olympique
	Limoux Grizzlies
	Total	165	17	0	0	56
Representative
Years	Team	Pld	T	G	FG	P
1997–00	Lebanon	6	1

Coaching information
Club
Years	Team	Gms	W	D	L	W%
2002–03	Pia Donkeys
Representative
Years	Team	Gms	W	D	L	W%
2000–04	Lebanon	10	7	1	2	70
2008–09	Lebanon	5	3	0	2	60

John Elias (Arabic: جون إلياس; born 10 December 1963) is a Lebanese-Australian former professional rugby league footballer and coach. During the 1980s and 1990s he played for clubs in Sydney, Brisbane, England and France where he also coached. Elias also played and coached for the Lebanon national team.

== Background ==
Elias was born in Beirut, Lebanon. As a child, along with his two older brothers and sister, he was taken by his mother to Sydney following the death of his father. There he became an Australian citizen.

== Playing career ==
=== 1980s ===
After starting his first grade career with the Newtown Jets in their final season in 1983, Elias then played for the South Sydney Rabbitohs in 1984. The following season he moved north, and in the 1985 Brisbane Rugby League season's grand final for the Wayne Bennett-coached Souths Magpies, Elias was named man-of-the-match for his performance in a shock 10-8 victory over Wally Lewis' Wynnum-Manly Seagulls.

Elias joined the Canterbury-Bankstown Bulldogs in 1986 but departed from the club mid-way through the season to join the Western Suburbs Magpies. Early in the 1987 Winfield Cup season, Elias was sent off for a high tackle in a match against North Sydney Bears. He joined the Eastern Suburbs Roosters in 1988. Early in the 1988 Winfield Cup season while playing for Easts, Elias' jaw was fractured in a tackle during the first minutes of a match against Balmain. Part-way through the 1989 NSWRL season, he left Eastern Suburbs to join the Balmain Tigers club, where he stayed until 1994.

=== 1990s ===
Elias left Balmain to re-join the Rabbitohs mid-way through the 1994 Winfield Cup season. That season Elias was involved in a match-fixing plot that involved four players from his Souths team and four players from Wests. Elias was jailed for nine months in 1995 after pleading guilty in the NSW District Court to two counts of supplying amphetamines, one count of possessing F1 sub-machinegun parts and one count of possessing prohibited articles, namely military-style flak vests. Elias was the inaugural captain of the Lebanese rugby league team when they made their début in the 1997 World Sevens tournament, going on to reach the quarter-finals. He later travelled to France to play for Avignon and Toulouse.

Elias was diagnosed with stomach cancer in 1999 at age 38, but postponed chemotherapy to play an international match for Lebanon against France. Later he underwent surgery to remove a tennis-ball sized lymphoma which had burst inside his stomach, forcing him into retirement.

== Coaching career ==
Instead of being Lebanon's captain for their campaign to join the 2000 World Cup, he served as their coach. Elias was refused entry into the United States for Lebanon's 2000 World Cup qualifier match due to his previous firearms conviction. Elias coached French club Pia Donkeys in 2002 and 2003, taking them from last in the competition to runners-up, before returning to Australia.

In 2004 Elias was facing up to 25 years in jail after a jury found him guilty of maliciously shooting his business partner in the leg. He ended up serving four years in prison. In 2008, following Elias' release from prison, it was reported that he and Arthur Beetson, who had advised Elias during the 2000 World Cup, were preparing a bid for a rugby league coaching job in Europe. In June 2009, following the conviction of Greg Bird, Elias wrote an article published by News Limited detailing his time in prison. That year Elias coached Lebanon in the 2009 European Cup tournament.

== After football ==
In 2010 Elias published his book, Sin Bin: The Untold Story of a True Footy Bad Boy, which detailed his life of football and crime. In the 2011 pre-season, he was arrested under suspicion of involvement in the 2010 spot fixing case perpetrated by Ryan Tandy, but was found not guilty.

In August 2014 Elias was found guilty of assault and given a five-month suspended jail sentence.

Sporting positions
Preceded by	Coach; Pia Donkeys; 2002-2003	Succeeded by Craig Field; 2003
