= Australian Sports Anti-Doping Authority =

Sports Anti-Doping Authority in Australia

Authority overview
- Formed: 13 March 2006
- Dissolved: 30 June 2020
- Superseding authority: Sport Integrity Australia
- Jurisdiction: Australia
- Headquarters: Fyshwick, Australian Capital Territory, Australia
- Minister responsible: Richard Colbeck, Minister for Sport
- Key document: Australian Sports Anti‑Doping Authority Act 2006
- Website: www.sportintegrity.gov.au

The Australian Sports Anti-Doping Authority (ASADA) was a Federal Government statutory authority tasked to protect Australia's sporting integrity through the elimination of doping. The authority was part of the Department of Health's portfolio and was established on 13 March 2006 under the Australian Sports Anti‑Doping Authority Act 2006. On 1 July 2020, it became part of Sport Integrity Australia.

The ASADA drug tested Australian athletes who competed at state and national levels. ASADA also tested international athletes if they were competing in events held in Australia. It was also ASADA's role to inform the sporting community of drugs and related safety issues. The ASADA Advisory Group was relied upon by the chief executive officer, David Sharpe, as a consultative forum on matters related to the agency's purpose.

== Officeholders ==
=== Chair ===
The following individuals have served as Chair of the Authority:

Order	Officeholder	Title	Term began	Term end
1	Peter Baume	Chair	1991	1998
2	Dianne Sias	Chair	1999	
3	Brian Sando	Chair	2000	2005
4	Richard Ings	Chair	2005	2006

=== Chief executive officer ===
The following individuals have served as chief executive officer of the authority. When ASADA replaced the Australian Sports Drug Agency in 2006, the chair and chief executive positions were combined.

Order	Officeholder	Title	Term began	Term end
1	Steve Haynes	Chief Executive Officer	1991	1995
2	Natalie Howson	Chief Executive Officer	1991	1995
3	John Mendoza	Chief Executive Officer	2001	2005
4	Richard Ings	Chief Executive Officer	2006	2010
5	Aurora Andruska	Chief Executive Officer	2010	2014
6	Ben McDevitt	Chief Executive Officer	2014	2017
7	David Sharpe	Chief Executive Officer	2017	2020

== See also ==
- Drugs in sport in Australia
- Sports in Australia
