= List of AFL debuts in 1991 =

This is a list of players in the Australian Football League (AFL) who either made their AFL debut or played for a new club during the 1991 AFL season.

This was Adelaide's first season in the competition, and as such they yielded 30 league debutants. A total of 116 players made their league debuts across the competition. Fitzroy's 13 debutants became the record for a team in a single season excluding debut seasons, a record which stood until Essendon unveiled 15 debutants in 2025.

== Summary ==
Summary of debuts in 1991
Club	AFL debuts	Change of club
Adelaide	30	7
Brisbane Bears	11	7
Carlton	4	1
Collingwood	6	0
Essendon	5	2
Fitzroy	13	3
Footscray	7	1
Geelong	2	3
Hawthorn	4	0
Melbourne	6	3
North Melbourne	3	2
Richmond	6	4
St Kilda	6	6
Sydney	6	3
West Coast	7	4
Total	116	46

== AFL debuts ==
Name	Club	Age at debut	Debut round	Notes
Darel Hart	Adelaide	27 years, 78 days	1	
Eddie Hocking	Adelaide	21 years, 75 days	1	
Rod Jameson	Adelaide	20 years, 265 days	1	
Andrew Jarman	Adelaide	25 years, 67 days	1	
Darren Jarman	Hawthorn	24 years, 53 days	1	
John Klug	Adelaide	25 years, 175 days	1	
Scott Lee	Adelaide	27 years, 290 days	1	
Bruce Lindsay	Adelaide	29 years, 243 days	1	
David Marshall	Adelaide	30 years, 265 days	1	
Rodney Maynard	Adelaide	24 years, 182 days	1	
Chris McDermott	Adelaide	27 years, 138 days	1	
Peter McIntyre	Adelaide	24 years, 75 days	1	
Romano Negri	Adelaide	26 years, 173 days	1	
Matthew Robran	Hawthorn	20 years, 3 days	1	
Nigel Smart	Adelaide	21 years, 305 days	1	
Darren Smith	Adelaide	26 years, 41 days	1	
Robbie Thompson	Adelaide	23 years, 151 days	1	
Simon Tregenza	Adelaide	20 years, 13 days	1	
Tom Warhurst Jr.	Adelaide	28 years, 33 days	1	
Gilbert McAdam	St Kilda	23 years, 358 days	1	
Mark McQueen	Richmond	21 years, 73 days	1	
Jason Smith	Richmond	18 years, 222 days	1	
Scott Turner	Richmond	20 years, 296 days	1	
Tony Evans	West Coast	21 years, 283 days	1	
David Hynes	West Coast	23 years, 358 days	1	
Allen Jakovich	Melbourne	23 years, 3 days	1	
David Schwarz	Melbourne	18 years, 243 days	1	
Jamie Grant	Footscray	20 years, 274 days	1	
Paul Williams	Collingwood	17 years, 355 days	1	
Darren Cuthbertson	Melbourne	20 years, 357 days	2	
Brad Davis	Fitzroy	18 years, 255 days	2	
Brenton Klaebe	Fitzroy	24 years, 158 days	2	
Shayne Stevenson	Fitzroy	20 years, 291 days	2	
Richard Champion	Brisbane Bears	22 years, 305 days	2	
Troy Clarke	Brisbane Bears	21 years, 295 days	2	
Peter Mann	North Melbourne	20 years, 204 days	2	
Jason Millar	Brisbane Bears	20 years, 212 days	2	
Damien Murray	North Melbourne	20 years, 114 days	2	
David Ogg	Brisbane Bears	23 years, 127 days	2	
Justin Staritski	North Melbourne	20 years, 263 days	2	
Allan Bartlett	Adelaide	23 years, 312 days	2	
Andrew Cavedon	Carlton	19 years, 146 days	2	
Scott Hodges	Adelaide	22 years, 339 days	2	
Brad Fox	Essendon	21 years, 174 days	2	
Todd Ridley	Essendon	22 years, 49 days	2	
Gavin Wanganeen	Essendon	17 years, 287 days	2	Winner of the 1993 Brownlow Medal
Stephen Hooper	Geelong	21 years, 327 days	2	
Stephen Anderson	Collingwood	23 years, 79 days	3	
Danny Noonan	Brisbane Bears	22 years, 128 days	3	
Todd Menegola	Richmond	23 years, 102 days	3	
Stephen Rowe	Adelaide	25 years, 155 days	3	
Brian Stanislaus	Sydney	19 years, 251 days	3	
Kevin Dyson	Melbourne	23 years, 338 days	3	
Mark Bickley	Adelaide	21 years, 252 days	4	
Peter Filandia	Essendon	20 years, 334 days	4	
Jamie Elliott	Fitzroy	18 years, 66 days	4	
Laurence Schache	Brisbane Bears	23 years, 179 days	4	
Mark Richardson	Collingwood	18 years, 171 days	5	
Shane Strempel	Brisbane Bears	22 years, 89 days	5	
Peter Worsfold	Brisbane Bears	20 years, 283 days	5	
Frank Bizzotto	Fitzroy	19 years, 325 days	5	
Wayne Campbell	Richmond	18 years, 209 days	5	
Dean Harding	Fitzroy	19 years, 192 days	5	
Clayton Lamb	Adelaide	26 years, 294 days	5	
Andrew Ford	Melbourne	20 years, 221 days	6	
David Noble	Fitzroy	23 years, 348 days	6	
Peter Caven	Fitzroy	20 years, 352 days	7	
Justin McGrath	Fitzroy	20 years, 149 days	7	
Stephen Paxman	Fitzroy	20 years, 150 days	7	
Ryan Turnbull	West Coast	19 years, 223 days	7	
Greg Whittlesea	Hawthorn	27 years, 285 days	7	
Paul Gow	Footscray	21 years, 343 days	7	
Ben Doolan	Sydney	18 years, 115 days	7	
Jamie Lawson	Sydney	19 years, 212 days	7	
Andrew Wills	Geelong	19 years, 122 days	7	
Mitchell White	West Coast	18 years, 115 days	8	
Matthew Liptak	Adelaide	21 years, 17 days	9	
Michael James	Carlton	19 years, 139 days	9	
Ben Sexton	Footscray	18 years, 201 days	9	
Paul Hills	Essendon	18 years, 240 days	9	
Russell Merriman	Geelong	23 years, 42 days	9	
David Donato	Fitzroy	20 years, 254 days	9	
Darron Wilkinson	Fitzroy	21 years, 184 days	10	
Jason McCartney	Collingwood	17 years, 72 days	10	
Kym Russell	Collingwood	23 years, 44 days	10	
Corey Bell	Brisbane Bears	18 years, 122 days	10	
Darren Holmes	Sydney	20 years, 265 days	10	
Ashley McIntosh	West Coast	18 years, 224 days	11	
Jeff Hilton	St Kilda	19 years, 5 days	11	
Rohan Smith	St Kilda	24 years, 338 days	11	
Troy Lehmann	Collingwood	19 years, 96 days	11	
Justin Clarkson	Sydney	22 years, 246 days	12	
Darren Tarczon	Carlton	20 years, 100 days	12	
Glen Jakovich	West Coast	18 years, 77 days	12	
David Brown	Adelaide	21 years, 253 days	12	
Michael Johnston	Hawthorn	20 years, 119 days	13	
Sean Tasker	Adelaide	23 years, 11 days	15	
Matthew Kelly	Adelaide	20 years, 4 days	16	
Wayne Weidemann	Adelaide	24 years, 258 days	16	
Greg Jones	St Kilda	21 years, 137 days	16	
Jamie Bond	Fitzroy	19 years, 243 days	17	
Fabian Francis	Melbourne	17 years, 262 days	17	
Shaun Rehn	Adelaide	19 years, 338 days	18	
Simon Luhrs	Brisbane Bears	21 years, 39 days	19	
Matthew Croft	Footscray	18 years, 151 days	19	
Tim Allen	St Kilda	20 years, 288 days	19	
Andrew Payze	Adelaide	24 years, 337 days	19	
Matthew Mansfield	Footscray	22 years, 40 days	20	
Darren Stanley	Footscray	19 years, 189 days	21	
Ian Kidgell	Brisbane Bears	20 years, 262 days	21	
Matthew Ahmat	Footscray	17 years, 44 days	21	
Dean Greig	St Kilda	22 years, 283 days	21	
Paul Patterson	Adelaide	25 years, 322 days	22	
Neil Brunton	Sydney	22 years, 226 days	22	
Robbie West	West Coast	22 years, 177 days	24	
Nathan Bower	Richmond	19 years, 84 days	24	
Ang Christou	Carlton	19 years, 227 days	24	
Ty Esler	Richmond	19 years, 355 days	24	

== Change of AFL club ==
Name	Club	Age at debut	Debut round	Former clubs
Grantley Fielke	Adelaide	29 years, 4 days	1	Collingwood
Tony McGuinness	Adelaide	26 years, 320 days	1	Footscray
Bruce Lindner	Adelaide	29 years, 275 days	1	Geelong
Terry Keays	Richmond	20 years, 324 days	1	Collingwood
Russell Morris	St Kilda	28 years, 295 days	1	Hawthorn
Stephen Newport	St Kilda	25 years, 138 days	1	Melbourne
Brian Wilson	St Kilda	20 years, 324 days	1	Footscray
Brian Wilson	St Kilda	20 years, 324 days	1	Melbourne
Brian Wilson	St Kilda	20 years, 324 days	1	North Melbourne
Phil Egan	Melbourne	28 years, 43 days	1	Richmond
Mark Hepburn	West Coast	22 years, 207 days	1	North Melbourne
Rod Owen	Melbourne	24 years, 52 days	1	St Kilda
Matthew Bourke	Fitzroy	22 years, 202 days	2	Hawthorn
Joe Cormack	Fitzroy	24 years, 212 days	2	West Coast
David O'Connell	Fitzroy	27 years, 281 days	2	West Coast
David Cameron	Brisbane Bears	26 years, 360 days	2	Geelong
Peter Curran	Brisbane Bears	28 years, 258 days	2	Hawthorn
Shane Hamilton	Brisbane Bears	20 years, 224 days	2	Geelong
Michael McLean	Brisbane Bears	26 years, 27 days	2	Footscray
Mark Roberts	North Melbourne	25 years, 275 days	2	Brisbane Bears
Mark Roberts	North Melbourne	25 years, 275 days	2	Sydney
Michael Murphy	Adelaide	25 years, 204 days	2	North Melbourne
Warren McKenzie	Sydney	26 years, 244 days	2	Carlton
Mark Athorn	Sydney	25 years, 275 days	2	Footscray
Mark Athorn	Sydney	25 years, 275 days	2	Fitzroy
Darren Davies	St Kilda	25 years, 169 days	2	Footscray
Sean Simpson	Geelong	20 years, 350 days	2	St Kilda
Jason Love	Sydney	25 years, 125 days	3	North Melbourne
Paul Bryce	Melbourne	22 years, 269 days	3	North Melbourne
Tony Antrobus	St Kilda	28 years, 364 days	3	Essendon
Bruce Abernethy	Adelaide	28 years, 332 days	3	North Melbourne
Bruce Abernethy	Adelaide	28 years, 332 days	3	Collingwood
Danny Hughes	Adelaide	27 years, 124 days	3	Melbourne
Mark Trewella	Richmond	24 years, 289 days	4	Fitzroy
Sean Ralphsmith	St Kilda	24 years, 120 days	4	Hawthorn
Mark Mickan	Adelaide	30 years, 73 days	4	Brisbane Bears
Matthew Ryan	Brisbane Bears	23 years, 316 days	4	Collingwood
Matthew Ryan	Brisbane Bears	23 years, 316 days	4	Sydney
Phil Krakouer	Footscray	31 years, 95 days	5	North Melbourne
Mark Arceri	Carlton	26 years, 178 days	5	North Melbourne
Jamie Lamb	Geelong	23 years, 14 days	6	St Kilda
Cory Young	West Coast	20 years, 66 days	8	Richmond
Carl Dilena	North Melbourne	24 years, 55 days	8	Fitzroy
John Mrakov	Richmond	22 years, 176 days	8	Collingwood
Andrew Underwood	Richmond	23 years, 302 days	8	Essendon
Craig Potter	Brisbane Bears	25 years, 113 days	8	Sydney
David Robertson	Essendon	28 years, 276 days	9	Collingwood
Paul Morrish	Essendon	23 years, 6 days	9	Richmond
Ian Dargie	West Coast	27 years, 206 days	12	St Kilda
Rob Dickson	Brisbane Bears	27 years, 207 days	12	Hawthorn
Dale Kickett	West Coast	23 years, 49 days	14	Fitzroy
Trevor Spencer	Geelong	26 years, 23 days	18	Essendon
Trevor Spencer	Geelong	26 years, 23 days	18	Melbourne
