= 1990 AFL draft =

Draft for the Australian Football League

The 1990 AFL draft was the fifth annual draft of Australian rules footballers to the 14 clubs in the Australian Football League. It consisted of the national draft held at the end of the 1990 season, the pre-season draft held before the 1991 AFL season, and a mid-season draft.

Clubs receive picks based on the reverse of the position in which they finish on the ladder during the season. This was introduced as an equalisation strategy in response to the increasing transfer fees and player salaries.

== National draft rules ==
The minimum draft age for the 1990 national draft was 16. Other than the West Coast Eagles, clubs were allowed to select only one West Australian player each and South Australian players were restricted to be only selected by the Adelaide Football Club which would join the AFL for the 1991 AFL season. Players in Queensland, New South Wales and the Australian Capital Territory could only be selected by clubs other than the Brisbane Bears and the Sydney Swans respectively if the player was older than 19 and not required by the 'local' club. Faced with these restrictions the league reduced the number of choices from 8 to 6. In exchange for the SA moratorium, the Crows were excluded from the draft (they could pick any South Australian, but only South Australians).

== Background ==
The talent pool was clearly shallow and most clubs shied away from investing too much hope in the draft. A number of the Victorian clubs, notably Richmond and Fitzroy, couldn't afford to recruit established players so stuck with country footballers and unproven youngsters. Clubs were believed to be looking to Tasmania as perhaps the only recruiting ground which hadn't been ravaged. The under-19's competition was still in operation and clubs had only to list players who had been drafted, and those over the age of 19. Essendon and North Melbourne at this point for example had very talented reserves sides drawn from their metropolitan zones (these zones would later provide the basis for the Northern Knights under-18 teams).

== Pre-draft ==
Pre-draft picks included Brisbane taking Darryl White from the Northern Territory which had become their 'zone'. Mitchell White and Glen Jakovich were fair additions to the West Coast Eagles squad. There were a number of notable trades. Brisbane traded Mark Roberts to North Melbourne who also secured Peter Mann from the Eagles. Geelong gave up forwards David Cameron and Shane Hamilton to get Brisbane's number 1 draft pick. The most noteworthy trade though was Hawthorn getting the rights to Darren Jarman, who turned down the chance to join the Adelaide Crows. Incidentally the Rohan Smith listed is the St Kilda one, not the Footscray one. Future Channel 7 commentator Russell Morris left Hawthorn for St Kilda.

== Players ==
Richmond drafted Matthew Clarke and Nick Daffy. Despite the restrictions on recruiting South Australians, Richmond skirted the rule because these two played in Mount Gambier and were registered with clubs in the Western Border Football League (VCFL). Melbourne drafted Allen Jakovich, who although a Western Australian was playing for South Australian National Football League (SANFL) side Woodville, and Brisbane were able to draft two Western Australian Football League (WAFL) players in Peter Worsfold (John's brother) and David Ogg. Matt Clape, Jakovich, Todd Ridley, James Cook, Jason McCartney, Scott Crow, Matthew Young, Stuart Anderson and Paul Sharkey were modestly successful. Matthew Burton, Fabian Francis and Derek Hall would all find success at different AFL clubs.

The only two definite successes were James Hird and Jamie Shanahan.

== Bits and pieces ==
Jason McCartney kept a diary on behalf of The Age newspaper detailing the weeks leading up to the draft. In it he reveals the confusion and uncertainty that a young footballer feels. McCartney from Nhill in Victoria (near the SA border) was hesitant about moving to Melbourne. He went to Adelaide as a guest of Glenelg Football Club and watched the AFL grand final on the big screen, as well as watching Glenelg lose the SA Grand Final the next day.

With Sydney and Brisbane having the first draft picks he signed for Glenelg on a two-year deal. When Sydney and Brisbane traded their selections his hopes lifted. Geelong told him that they would take Hooper first and would be attempting to get the second pick to take McCartney. Geelong were unable to manufacture a trade and Carlton ended up with the selection (they swapped ruckman Warren McKenzie to Sydney). Ian Collins, Geoff Walsh, Bruce Comben and Kinnear Beatson all drove up to Nhill to meet with McCartney, and the next morning David Parkin rang him to ask if everything went well.

On draft day Carlton opted for Tasmanian James Cook. Parkin said that he felt that Cook had the potential to be an even better player. Collingwood drafted him and McCartney openly admitted he was devastated and that Collingwood was last on his list of clubs.

The trades which made the above possible were Carlton swapping McKenzie to Sydney for 2 pick overall, and Collingwood swapping Terry Keays to Richmond for 4th pick overall. One recruiting officer commenting about the decision making of Sydney and Richmond said, "those clubs deserve to be in the position they are in if they are going to make choices like that".

== Preseason ==
Michael McLean joined the Brisbane Bears after having been not encouraged to stay with Footscray. Sean Simpson switched from St Kilda to Geelong and the Cats again demonstrated their ability to revive careers. David Cloke was encouraged to saddle up for one more season at Richmond who was finding recruiting a ruckman nearly impossible. Kevin Dyson was recruited to Melbourne. Collingwood audaciously recruited the recently retired Gerard Healy in the hope of persuading him to play on, but he didn't.

== Pre-draft picks ==
#	Player	Recruited by	Recruited from	League	Games with new club
1	Paul Mifka	Brisbane Bears	West Coast	Australian Football League (AFL)	0
2	Danny Noonan	Brisbane Bears	Clarence	Tasmanian Football League (TFL)	55
3	Roger Smith	Brisbane Bears	Southern Districts	Northern Territory Football League (NTFL)	0
4	Shane Strempel	Brisbane Bears	Swan Districts	Western Australian Football League (WAFL)	3
5	Darryl White	Brisbane Bears	Pioneer	Central Australian Football League (CAFL)	268
6	Ben Aulich	Sydney	Belconnen	Australian Capital Territory Football League (ACTFL)	0
7	Justin Clarkson	Sydney	Melbourne	AFL	3
8	Jason Love	Sydney	North Melbourne	AFL	23
9	Darren Morgan	Sydney	Geelong	AFL	0
10	Robert Neill	Sydney	Eastlake	ACTFL	21
11	Brad Sparks	Sydney	Melbourne	AFL	0
12	Glen Jakovich	West Coast	South Fremantle	WAFL	276
13	Mitchell White	West Coast	Subiaco	WAFL	151

== Pre-draft trades ==
Player	Recruited by	Recruited from	Games with new club
David Cameron	Brisbane Bears	Geelong	16
Peter Curran	Brisbane Bears	Hawthorn	14
Rob Dickson	Brisbane Bears	Hawthorn	2
Shane Hamilton	Brisbane Bears	Geelong	31
Travis Martin-Benyon	Brisbane Bears	Nth Melbourne	0
Craig Potter	Brisbane Bears	Sydney	13
Mark Arceri	Carlton	Nth Melbourne	17
Joe Cormack	Fitzroy	West Coast	26
David O'Connell	Fitzroy	West Coast	21
Darren Jarman	Hawthorn	Brisbane Bears	109
Paul Bryce	Melbourne	Nth Melbourne	26
Phil Egan	Melbourne	Richmond	1
Rod Owen	Melbourne	St Kilda	9
John Ahern	Nth Melbourne	Melbourne	0
Peter Mann	Nth Melbourne	West Coast	39
Mark Roberts	Nth Melbourne	Brisbane Bears	87
Terry Keays	Richmond	Collingwood	25
Russell Morris	St Kilda	Hawthorn	66
Stephen Newport	St Kilda	Melbourne	39
Sean Ralphsmith	St Kilda	Hawthorn	30
Rohan Smith	St Kilda	Sydney	3
Warwick Capper	Sydney	Brisbane Bears	13
Warren McKenzie	Sydney	Carlton	21
Ian Dargie	West Coast	St Kilda	1
Mark Hepburn	West Coast	Nth Melbourne	13
Dale Kickett	West Coast	Fitzroy	2

== 1990 mid-season draft ==
Pick	Player	Recruited by	Recruited from	League	Games with club
1	Laurence Schache	Brisbane Bears	West Torrens	South Australian National Football League (SANFL)	29
2	Dale Lewis	Sydney	North Ballarat	Ballarat Football League (Ballarat FL)	182
3	Mark Brady	Fitzroy	Old Scotch	Victorian Amateur Football Association (VAFA)	0
4	Andrew Payze	Richmond	West Torrens	SANFL	0
5	Tim Williamson	North Melbourne	Casterton	Western Border Football League (WBFL)	0
6	Craig Cross	Carlton	Burnie Hawks	Tasmanian Football League (TFL)	0
7	Darren Bartsch	Geelong	West Adelaide	SANFL	0
8	Phil Krakouer	North Melbourne	Footscray	AFL	7
9	Steven Cummings	St Kilda	Sandringham	Victorian Football League (VFL)	14
10	Craig McNaughton	West Coast	Sandhurst	Bendigo Football League (Bendigo FL)	0
11	Damian Stoney	Hawthorn	Old Xaverians	VAFA	0
12	Jamie Duursma	Melbourne	Melbourne	AFL	0
13	Andrew Hardiman	Collingwood	South Warrnambool	Hampden Football League (HFL)	0
14	Paul Morrish	Essendon	Richmond	AFL	7
15	David Greenhill	Brisbane Bears	Wodonga	O&MFL	0
16	Paul Smit	Sydney	Springvale	VFL	0
17	Darron Wilkinson	Fitzroy	Camberwell	VFL	1
18	Scott Turner	Richmond	Ararat	Wimmera Football League (WFL)	144
19	Anthony Pavey	North Melbourne	Churchill	Gippsland League	0
20	Darren Read	Carlton	Dandenong	VFL	0
21	Luke Hampshire	Geelong	Tyrendarra	South West District Football League (SWDFL)	0
22	Jamie Grant	Footscray	Daylesford	Central Highlands Football League (CHFL)	5
23	Damian Sexton	St Kilda	Yarrawonga	Ovens & Murray Football League (O&MFL)	4
24	Jamie Weeding	Hawthorn	Norwood	SANFL	0
25	Peter Vandermeer	Melbourne	Frankston	VFL	0
26	Stephen Anderson	Collingwood	South Warrnambool	HFL	4
27	David Robertson	Essendon	Euroa	Goulburn Valley Football League (GVFL)	3
28	Dean Strauch	Brisbane Bears	Golden Square	Bendigo FL	0
29	Tim Symes	Sydney	Benalla	GVFL	0
30	Darren Collins	Fitzroy	Port Melbourne	VFL	4
31	Damian Hancock	Geelong	Leitchville	Northern District Football League (NDFL)	0
32	Michael Frost	Footscray	Swan Hill	Central Murray Football League (CMFL)	13
33	Bernie Harris	St Kilda	Terang	HFL	45
34	Stephen Moloney	Hawthorn	North Melbourne Old Boys	VAFA	0
35	Paul Hogarth	Melbourne	Northern United		0
36	Jason Morton	Collingwood	Wagga Tigers	Riverina Football League (RFL)	0
37	Andrew Mills	Essendon	North Shore	New South Wales Australian Football League (NSWAFL)	0
38	Glen Bartlett	Brisbane Bears	East Perth	Western Australian Football League (WAFL)	0
39	Nick Tsiotinas	Footscray	Essendon	AFL	0
40	Chris Melican	St Kilda	Glenelg	SANFL	0
41	Martin Cameron	Hawthorn	Traralgon	Gippsland League	0
42	David Morrison	Melbourne	Devonport	TFL	0
43	Michael Thomson	Essendon	Richmond	AFL	0
44	Barry Spierings	Footscray	Werribee	VFL	0
45	Jolyon Keeble	Hawthorn	Old Melburnians	VAFA	0

== 1990 national draft ==
#	Player	Recruited by	Recruited from	Games with new club
1	Stephen Hooper	Geelong	East Perth (WAFL)	21
2	James Cook	Carlton	Clarence (TFL)	25
3	David Donato	Fitzroy	Clarence (TFL)	12
4	Jason McCartney	Collingwood	Nhill (WFL)	38
5	Stewart Devlin	Geelong	Horsham (WFL)	0
6	Allen Jakovich	Melbourne	Woodville (SANFL)	47
7	Damian Hampson	Carlton	Subiaco (WAFL)	0
8	Paul Gow	Footscray	Swan Districts (WAFL)	7
9	Matt Clape	West Coast	East Perth (WAFL)	29
10	David Ogg	Brisbane	Swan Districts (WAFL)	9
11	Danny Sexton	Nth Melbourne	Lemnos (GVFL)	0
12	Shane Porter	West Coast	North Launceston (TFL)	0
13	Todd Ridley	Essendon	Claremont (WAFL)	25
14	Andrew Hamer	Collingwood	Lakes Entrance (EGFL)	0
15	Andrew Harrison	Brisbane	Benalla (VCFL)	0
16	Todd Menegola	Richmond	Swan Districts (WAFL)	19
17	Brendan Hehir	Geelong	Darley (VCFL)	0
18	Dan Miller	Nth Melbourne	Morwell (VCFL)	0
19	Gary Merritt	Melbourne	Tatura (VCFL)	0
20	Robbie West	West Coast	Wodonga (VCFL)	13
21	Richard Ambrose	Essendon	Shepparton (VCFL)	0
22	Paul Sharkey	Collingwood	Cath C. Bendigo (VCFL)	26
23	Ben Thomas	Brisbane	Port Fairy (VCFL)	0
24	John Fidge	Essendon	Glenelg (SANFL)	0
25	Peter Worsfold	Brisbane	South Fremantle (WAFL)	31
26	Dale Hall	Sydney	Hobart (TFL)	0
27	Brad Davis	Fitzroy	Burnie Hawks (TFL)	5
28	Chris Smith	Richmond	Assumption Coll. (APS)	0
29	Byron Donnellan	Geelong	Donald (VCFL)	0
30	Matthew Young	Hawthorn	St Pats Launceston (Tas)	21
31	Nick Faull	Brisbane	Golden Point (BFL)	0
32	Matthew Moylan	Footscray	Shepparton (VCFL)	0
33	Matthew Kelly	Nth Melbourne	Wedderburn (VCFL)	0
34	Brad Read	Hawthorn	East Fremantle (WAFL)	0
35	Stuart Anderson	Nth Melbourne	Sale (VCFL)	61
36	Matthew Burton	West Coast	Subiaco (WAFL)	0
37	Glen Hoffman	Essendon	Jeparit (VCFL)	0
38	Grant McFarlane	Collingwood	Wodonga (VCFL)	0
39	Nigel Palfreyman	Brisbane	Sandy Bay (TFL)	15
40	Mark Collins	Sydney	South Fremantle (WAFL)	0
41	Mark Jenkinson	Fitzroy	Willaura (VCFL)	0
42	Mark McQueen	Richmond	North Hobart (TFL)	5
43	Glen Thomlinson	Geelong	Rochester (VCFL)	0
44	Scott Crow	Hawthorn	Port Fairy (VCFL)	13
45	Craig Jennings	Nth Melbourne	Traralgon (VCFL)	0
46	Brian McInnes	Footscray	Wick.-L. Bolac (VCFL)	0
47	Luke Chambers	Brisbane	Lucknow (VCFL)	0
48	Willie Rioli	Hawthorn	South Fremantle (WAFL)	0
49	Nick Daffy	Richmond	North Gambier (SA)	165
50	Craig Ellis	Nth Melbourne	Stawell (VCFL)	0
51	Jarrod Carter	Essendon	North Hobart (TFL)	0
52	Brendon Retzlaff	Collingwood	Swan Districts (WAFL)	0
53	Stephen Pears	Nth Melbourne	Perth (WAFL)	0
54	Brian Stanislaus	Sydney	St Mary's (NTFL)	1
55	Steven Byers	Fitzroy	New Norfolk (TFL)	0
56	Matthew Clarke	Richmond	West Gambier (SA)	0
57	Chris Barzen	Geelong	Mooroopna (VCFL)	0
58	Adrian Goldup	Sydney	Redcliffs (VCFL)	0
59	Cameron James	Carlton	Morwell (VCFL)	0
60	Rodney Harvey	Footscray	Trinity-Ararat (VCFL)	0
61	Michael Scoon	North Melbourne	Monbulk (VCFL)	0
62	Ben Herrald	Hawthorn	Assumption Coll. (APS)	0
63	Fabian Francis	Melbourne	Southern Districts (NTFL)	1
64	Derek Hall	West Coast	West Perth (WAFL)	2
65	Stephen Fry	Essendon	Clarence (TFL)	0
66	Bowden Hamilton	Collingwood	Colbinabbin (VCFL)	0
67	David Griffin	Sydney	South Bendigo (VCFL)	0
68	Peter Whyte	Brisbane	South Barwon (VCFL)	0
69	Gavin Cooney	West Coast	Clarence (TFL)	0
70	Stuart Johnstone	Richmond	Melbourne	0
71	Dennis Ryan	Geelong	Kyabram (VCFL)	0
72	Brian Wilson	St Kilda	Melbourne	7
73	Anthony McDonald	Carlton	Ballarat YCW (VCFL)	0
74	Paul Campbell	Footscray	Cobram (VCFL)	0
75	Robert Panozza	Melbourne	Wodonga Raiders (VCFL)	0
76	Robert Bowden	Hawthorn	Robinvale (VCFL)	0
77	Niall Buckley	Melbourne	County Kildare (Ireland)	0
78	Dean Harding	Fitzroy	Wangaratta Rovers (VCFL)	19
79	James Hird	Essendon	Ainslie (ACT)	253
80	Scott O'Donohue	Collingwood	Bungaree (VCFL)	0
81	Luan Morley	Hawthorn	North Ballarat (VCFL)	0
82	Leigh Campbell	Sydney	Campbelltown (NSW)	0
83	Mark Williams	West Coast	Sandhurst (BFL)	0
84	John Peter-Budge	Richmond	St Kilda	0
85	Brad Dowling	Geelong	Mooroopna (VCFL)	0
86	Sam Jones	St Kilda	Sandy Bay (TFL)	3
87	Danny Morgan	Carlton	Boolarra (VCFL)	0
88	Peter Jacks	Footscray	Ballarat YCW (VCFL)	0
89	Simon Wood	Nth Melbourne	St Arnaud (VCFL)	0
90	Adam Ahern	Hawthorn	Devonport (TFL)	0
91	Adam Rudd	St Kilda	Numurkah (VCFL)	0
92	Jamie Shanahan	St Kilda	Hobart (TFL)	125
93	Adam Houlihan	Essendon	Kyabram (VCFL)	0
94	Chris Ryan	Collingwood	Morwell StVincents (VCFL)	0

== 1991 pre-season draft ==
#	Player	Recruited by	Recruited from	Games
1	Michael McLean	Brisbane Bears	Footscray	87
2	Paul Hawke	Sydney	Collingwood	1
3	Matthew Bourke	Fitzroy	Hawthorn	2
4	Mark Trewella	Richmond	Fitzroy	4
5	Sean Simpson	Geelong	St Kilda	114
6	Tony Antrobus	St Kilda	Essendon	6
7	Matthew Ryan	Brisbane Bears	Sydney	18
8	Mark Athorn	Sydney	Fitzroy	15
9	Justin McGrath	Fitzroy	Hawthorn	8
10	Andrew Underwood	Richmond	Essendon	12
11	Jamie Lamb	Geelong	St Kilda	14
12	Darren Davies	St Kilda	Footscray	2
13	Darren Tarczon	Carlton	North Melbourne	11
14	Allan McKellar	Footscray	Richmond	0
15	Carl Dilena	North Melbourne	Fitzroy	10
16	Dale Fleming	Hawthorn	Hawthorn	0
17	Nick Sebo	Melbourne	St Kilda	0
18	Cory Young	West Coast	Richmond	1
19	Mathew Medew	Essendon	Essendon	0
20	Derek Percival	Collingwood	Golden Square (VCFL)	0
21	Adrian Menara	Geelong	North Melbourne	0
22	Saade Ghazi	Footscray	Central District	0
23	Leigh Capsalis	Melbourne	Melbourne	0
24	Ian Kidgell	Brisbane Bears	Hawthorn	3
25	Andrew Peck	Sydney	Melbourne	0
26	Wayne Peters	Fitzroy	Richmond	0
27	John Mrakov	Richmond	Collingwood	8
28	Russell Merriman	Geelong	St Josephs (VCFL)	25
29	Damien Pearce	St Kilda	St Kilda	0
30	Ben Robertson	Carlton	Noble Park (VMFL)	3
31	Scott McDonald	Footscray	Bell Post Hill (VCFL)	0
32	Peter Baldwin	North Melbourne	Geelong	0
33	Anthony Paynter	Hawthorn	Brisbane Bears	0
34	Kevin Dyson	Melbourne	Oakleigh	70
35	Craig McNaughton	West Coast	West Coast	0
36	Darren Williams	Essendon	Essendon	0
37	Stephen Anderson	Collingwood	South Warrnambool (VCFL)	4
38	Jon Henry	Brisbane Bears	Carlton	0
39	Darren McAsey	Sydney	Sydney	3
40	Jamie Bond	Fitzroy	Hawthorn	1
41	David Cloke	Richmond	Richmond	22
42	Stephen Jankowicz	Geelong	East Gambier (SA)	0
43	Dean Greig	St Kilda	Camberwell (VFA)	33
44	Mark Bouw	Carlton	Carlton	0
45	David Ross	Footsray	Darwin	0
46	Anthony Palmer	North Melbourne	North Melbourne	0
47	Mark McLeod	Hawthorn	Richmond	0
48	George Gorozidis	Melbourne	St Kilda	0
49	Brad Edwards	West Coast	Brisbane Bears	0
50	Mathew Strickland	Essendon	Essendon	0
51	Ross Duffy	Collingwood	North Hobart	0
52	Paul Williams	Carlton	St Kilda	0
53	Phil Krakouer	Footscray	Footscray	7
54	Dean Barwick	North Melbourne	North Melbourne	0
55	Craig Young	Hawthorn	Hawthorn	0
56	Passed	Melbourne	NA	NA
57	Peter Higgins	West Coast	West Coast	0
58	Shane Heard	Essendon	Essendon	11
59	Gerard Healy	Collingwood	Sydney	0
