= List of Brisbane Bears players =

This is a list of players to play for the Brisbane Bears in the Australian Football League (AFL).

== Brisbane Bears players ==
Key
Order	Players are listed in order of debut
Seasons	Includes Brisbane-only careers and spans from when a player was first listed with the club to their final year on the list
Debut	Debuts are for VFL/AFL regular season and finals series matches only
Games	Statistics are for VFL/AFL regular season and finals series matches only.
Goals	Statistics are for VFL/AFL regular season and finals series matches only.
†	Inducted into the Australian Football Hall of Fame.

=== 1980s ===
Order	Name	Seasons	Debut	Games	Goals
1	Peter Banfield	1987–1989	round 1, 1987	45	16
2	Matthew Campbell	1987–1993	round 1, 1987	79	28
3	Dale Dickson	1987–1989	round 1, 1987	30	3
4	Jim Edmond	1987–1988	round 1, 1987	17	42
5	John Fidge	1987–1989	round 1, 1987	27	38
6	Brad Hardie†	1987–1991	round 1, 1987	101	192
7	Bernie Harris	1987–1990	round 1, 1987	56	58
8	Neil Hein	1987–1988	round 1, 1987	15	12
9	Michael McCarthy	1987–1988	round 1, 1987	27	9
10	Mark Mickan	1987–1990	round 1, 1987	48	26
11	Cameron O'Brien	1987–1991	round 1, 1987	44	65
12	David O'Keeffe	1987–1991	round 1, 1987	68	25
13	Brenton Phillips	1987–1991	round 1, 1987	61	30
14	Geoff Raines	1987–1989	round 1, 1987	59	20
15	Steve Reynoldson	1987–1991	round 1, 1987	58	17
16	Mike Richardson	1987–1990	round 1, 1987	81	43
17	Mark Roberts	1987–1990	round 1, 1987	59	14
18	Phil Walsh	1987–1990	round 1, 1987	60	18
19	Chris Waterson	1987–1988	round 1, 1987	35	8
20	Mark Williams†	1987–1990	round 1, 1987	66	58
21	Darryl Cox	1987	round 2, 1987	1	1
22	Gary Shaw	1987	round 2, 1987	6	5
23	Frank Dunell	1987–1988	round 3, 1987	15	4
24	Stephen Williams	1987	round 3, 1987	4	1
25	Mark Buckley	1987	round 4, 1987	4	2
26	Rick Norman	1987	round 4, 1987	1	0
27	Tony Beckett	1987	round 5, 1987	6	2
28	Ben Harris	1987–1990	round 51, 1987	14	6
29	Peter Smith	1987	round 5, 1987	4	1
30	Neil Gaghan	1987	round 8, 1987	3	0
31	Rod MacPherson	1987	round 8, 1987	7	3
32	Allan Giffard	1987	round 9, 1987	1	0
33	Adam Garton	1987–1988	round 10, 1987	3	1
34	Darren Carlson	1987–1990	round 11, 1987	25	7
35	Chris Stacey	1987	round 11, 1987	3	5
36	Craig Evans	1987	round 12, 1987	2	2
37	Michael Gibson	1987–1991	round 12, 1987	52	3
38	Ken Judge	1987–1988	round 15, 1987	17	18
39	Mark Withers	1987–1988, 1990	round 15, 1987	36	29
40	Stuart Glascott	1987	round 19, 1987	4	0
41	Jamie Duursma	1987	round 21, 1987	1	0
42	Warwick Capper	1988–1990	round 1, 1988	34	71
43	Rodney Eade	1988–1990	round 1, 1988	30	3
44	Michael Kennedy	1988–1990	round 1, 1988	23	3
45	Scott McIvor	1988–1996	round 1, 1988	138	77
46	Roger Merrett	1988–1996	round 1, 1988	164	285
47	Robert Mace	1988	round 4, 1988	1	0
48	Andrew Taylor	1988–1991	round 4, 1988	31	13
49	Matthew Simpson	1988	round 7, 1988	9	2
50	Tony Lynn	1988	round 9, 1988	6	5
51	Rod Lester-Smith	1988–1991	round 11, 1988	39	15
52	David Bain	1989–1993	round 1, 1989	86	44
53	John Gastev	1989–1994	round 1, 1989	113	41
54	Alex Ishchenko	1989–1991	round 1, 1989	42	15
55	Martin Leslie	1989–1995	round 1, 1989	107	11
56	Simon Hose	1989	round 2, 1989	5	2
57	Lachlan Sim	1989–1991	round 3, 1989	21	5
58	Marcus Ashcroft	1989–1996	round 9, 1989	152	84
59	Chris O'Sullivan	1989–1990	round 9, 1989	8	2
60	Mark Zanotti	1989–1992	round 9, 1989	64	5

=== 1990s ===
Order	Name	Seasons	Debut	Games	Goals
61	Kevin Caton	1990	round 1, 1990	8	9
62	Brad Edwards	1990	round 1, 1990	10	0
63	Shaun Hart	1990–1996	round 1, 1990	102	81
64	Brad Rowe	1990–1991	round 1, 1990	14	9
65	Gavin Keane	1990	round 3, 1990	7	0
66	Matthew Kennedy	1990–1996	round 5, 1990	113	25
67	Richard Umbers	1990	round 5, 1990	4	0
68	Peter Davidson	1990	round 6, 1990	7	3
69	Jonathan Solomon	1990	round 11, 1990	2	1
70	David Wearne	1990–1992	round 15, 1990	18	2
71	Ray Windsor	1990–1993	round 15, 1990	23	22
72	David Cameron	1991	round 2, 1991	15	26
73	Richard Champion	1991–1996	round 2, 1991	119	37
74	Troy Clarke	1991–1996	round 2, 1991	68	31
75	Peter Curran	1991–1992	round 2, 1991	14	8
76	Shane Hamilton	1991–1992, 1994–1995	round 2, 1991	47	30
77	Michael McLean	1991–1996	round 2, 1991	87	17
78	Jason Millar	1991	round 2, 1991	1	0
79	David Ogg	1991	round 2, 1991	9	3
80	Danny Noonan	1991–1993	round 3, 1991	55	19
81	Matthew Ryan	1991–1992	round 4, 1991	18	8
82	Laurence Schache	1991–1992	round 4, 1991	29	64
83	Shane Strempel	1991	round 5, 1991	3	2
84	Peter Worsfold	1991–1993	round 5, 1991	31	24
85	Craig Potter	1991–1992	round 8, 1991	13	3
86	Corey Bell	1991	round 10, 1991	8	2
87	Rob Dickson	1991	round 12, 1991	2	0
88	Simon Luhrs	1991–1992	round 19, 1991	12	0
89	Matthew Ahmat	1991–1992	round 21, 1991	6	1
90	Ian Kidgell	1991	round 21, 1991	3	1
91	Colin Alexander	1992–1993	round 1, 1992	5	2
92	John Hutton	1992	round 1, 1992	18	43
93	Rod Owen	1992	round 1, 1992	9	21
94	Nigel Palfreyman	1992	round 1, 1992	15	7
95	Darryl White	1992–1996	round 1, 1992	90	106
96	Steven McLuckie	1992–1993	round 2, 1992	20	8
97	Ashley Green	1992–1993	round 3, 1992	23	2
98	Brendon Retzlaff	1992	round 3, 1992	15	2
99	Heath Shephard	1992	round 7, 1992	4	1
100	Russell Jeffrey	1992	round 10, 1992	8	1
101	Matthew Rendell	1992	round 11, 1992	13	7
102	Michael Voss†	1992–1996	round 18, 1992	79	72
103	Adam Kerinaiua	1992	round 21, 1992	3	1
104	Nathan Buckley†	1993	round 1, 1993	20	21
105	Nathan Chapman	1993–1996	round 1, 1993	49	12
106	Matthew Clarke	1993–1996	round 1, 1993	69	6
107	Adrian Fletcher	1993–1996	round 1, 1993	86	49
108	Justin Leppitsch	1993–1996	round 1, 1993	44	58
109	Fabian Francis	1993–1994	round 2, 1993	22	17
110	Michael Murphy	1993	round 2, 1993	10	22
111	Paul Peos	1993–1994	round 2, 1993	33	40
112	Dion Scott	1993–1996	round 3, 1993	49	39
113	Paul Spargo	1993	round 4, 1993	9	9
114	Brendan McCormack	1993–1994	round 5, 1993	12	9
115	Danny Craven	1993–1995	round 6, 1993	25	7
116	Martin Heffernan	1993	round 12, 1993	2	1
117	Damian Bourke	1993–1995	round 13, 1993	22	4
118	John Parker	1993	round 15, 1993	3	0
119	Brad Pearce	1993	round 19, 1993	2	1
120	Andrew Bews	1994–1996	round 1, 1994	56	2
121	Craig Lambert	1994–1996	round 1, 1994	49	19
122	Gilbert McAdam	1994–1996	round 1, 1994	58	41
123	Chris Scott	1994–1996	round 1, 1994	55	23
124	Troy Lehmann	1994	round 2, 1994	13	10
125	Craig Starcevich	1994–1995	round 2, 1994	20	16
126	Nigel Lappin†	1994–1996	round 3, 1994	61	40
127	Alastair Lynch	1994–1996	round 4, 1994	32	89
128	Rudi Frigo	1994–1995	round 10, 1994	8	1
129	Andrew Gowers	1995–1996	round 1, 1995	40	7
130	Ross Lyon	1995	round 1, 1995	2	0
131	Craig McRae	1995–1996	round 1, 1995	39	56
132	Steven Lawrence	1995	round 3, 1995	13	1
133	Jason Akermanis†	1995–1996	round 4, 1995	38	44
134	Shannon Corcoran	1995–1996	round 6, 1995	5	0
135	Shane Hodges	1995	round 11, 1995	4	0
136	Trent Bartlett	1995–1996	round 14, 1995	22	1
137	Brent Green	1995–1996	round 20, 1995	3	0
138	Danny Dickfos	1996	round 1, 1996	22	0
139	Troy Johnson	1996	round 1, 1996	2	0
140	Tristan Lynch	1996	round 2, 1996	21	1
141	Clark Keating	1996	round 6, 1996	14	9
142	Ben Robbins	1996	round 12, 1996	5	1
143	Daniel Bradshaw	1996	round 18, 1996	3	0

=== Listed players who did not play a senior game for Brisbane ===
Player	Date of birth (age when delisted)	Draft details	Rookie list	Senior list
Scott Adams	16 October 1964	1986 VFL Draft pick 14		
Michael Agnello	21 July 1977	1994 AFL Draft pick 85		
Adam Aherne	13 September 1973	1992 AFL Mid-season Draft pick 38		
Glen Bartlett	10 June 1964	1989 VFL Mid-season Draft pick 38		
Darren Bartsch	28 April 1969	1992 AFL Pre-season Draft pick 29		
Cameron Bennett	15 January 1975	1994 AFL Draft pick 24		
Peter Bennett	22 February 1965	1991 AFL Mid-season Draft pick 27		
Andrew Bishop	23 September 1966	1987 VFL Draft pick 28		
Campbell Black	9 May 1973	1992 AFL Pre-season Draft pick 51		
Terry Board	14 September 1968	1991 AFL Draft pick 27		
David Brown	29 September 1969	1989 VFL Draft pick 79		
Julian Burton	15 August 1973	1993 AFL Pre-season Draft pick 71		
Ashley Byrne	8 December 1969	1991 AFL Mid-season Draft pick 1		
Luke Chambers	2 July 1973	1990 AFL Draft pick 47		
Stephen Connelly	4 April 1963	1986 Pre-draft selection		
Andrew Gowling	7 February 1978	1995 AFL Draft pick 12		
David Greenhill	21 December 1965	1989 VFL Mid-season Draft pick 15		
Chris Guerts	4 November 1971	1989 VFL Draft pick 43		
Andrew Harrison	12 May 1974	1990 AFL Draft pick 15		
Jon Henry	29 August 1970	1991 AFL Pre-season Draft pick 38		
Brian Hinkley	19 October 1967	1989 Pre-draft pick 7		
Andrew Jarman	14 January 1966	1987 VFL Draft pick 15		
Darren Jarman	28 January 1967	1989 Pre-draft pick 4		
Gerard Jess	6 March 1977	1994 AFL Draft pick 75		
Jason Jones	22 March 1969	1992 AFL Pre-season Draft pick 15		
Simon Kenny	19 May 1970	1991 AFL Mid-season Draft pick 14		
John Klug	28 September 1965	1993 AFL Pre-season Draft pick 62		
David Kupsch	6 March 1971	1989 VFL Draft pick 100		
Adam Ladbrook	11 December 1968	1987 VFL Draft pick 54		
Aaron Lord	21 July 1975	1992 AFL Draft pick 66		
Travis Martin-Beynon	6 March 1972	1990 Pre-draft trade		
Chris McDermott	4 November 1963	1987 VFL Draft pick 2		
Colin McDonald	26 September 1961	1986 Pre-draft selection		
Darren Mead	29 March 1971	1993 AFL Pre-season Draft pick 36		
Paul Mifka	8 June 1965	1990 Concessional Pre-Draft pick		
Trent Mills	30 June 1973	1992 AFL Draft pick 96		
Tony Paynter	29 September 1971	1989 VFL Draft pick 93		
Glen Reeves	14 July 1967	1989 VFL Pre-season Draft pick 44		
Damian Ryan	18 April 1972	1993 AFL Mid-season Draft pick 18		
David Ryan	17 October 1970	1991 AFL Mid-season Draft pick 36		
Brian Sherriff	29 July 1969	1992 AFL Mid-season Draft pick 43		
Tim Sherman	17 March 1975	1993 AFL Draft pick 36		
Craig Somerville	24 September 1968	1988 VFL Draft: Traded from Footscray for pick 86		
Doug Smart	25 June 1969	1989 Pre-draft pick 8		
Roger Smith	14 June 1971	1990 Concessional Pre-Draft pick		
Brian Stanislaus	30 July 1971	1992 AFL Mid-season Draft pick 29		
Dean Strauch	4 June 1966	1989 VFL Mid-season Draft pick 28		
Michael Templeton	8 June 1962	1986 VFL Draft pick 53		
Nick Trask	6 February 1978	1995 AFL Draft pick 28		
Ben Thomas	2 December 1973	1990 AFL Draft pick 23		
Sean Valenta		1990 AFL Draft pick 107		
Brett Voss	22 February 1978	1995 Pre-draft zone selection		
Julian Waite	1 January 1975	1993 AFL Pre-season Draft pick 50		
Matthew Waters	8 January 1973	1996 AFL Pre-season Draft pick 19		
Adam Williamson	6 February 1975	1992 AFL Draft pick 51		
Joe Wilson	30 March 1970	1989 VFL Draft pick 51		
Derek Wirth	29 November 1978	1995 Pre-draft zone selection		
David Wittey	10 April 1966	1989 VFL Pre-season Draft pick 16		
Peter Whyte	25 February 1969	1990 AFL Draft pick 68		

== See also ==
- Category of Brisbane Bears players
- AFL Tables Full List of Brisbane Bears Players
