= 1990 WASFL season =

1990 premiership season
- Teams: 8
- Premiers: Swan Districts; 7th premiership
- Minor premiers: Claremont; 9th minor premiership
- Sandover Medallist: Mick Grasso (Swan Districts)
- Leading goalkicker: Glen Bartlett (East Perth)
- Matches played: 88

The 1990 WASFL season was the 106th season of senior Australian rules football in Perth, Western Australia. It saw the league, already realising that the damage from the admission to the VFL of West Coast would be permanent rather than temporary as was hoped in 1986, rebrand itself as the Western Australia State Football League, but the move was unsuccessful and reversed after a single season. The refusal of WASFL clubs to permit a West Coast reserves team in the WASFL (Note: The WAFL would eventually admit a West Coast reserves team for the 2019 season.) and the WAFC's refusal to accept one in the AFL's reserve grade competition led to further problems when Claremont said they would not play West Coast discards in the league team and produced a short-lived draft for such players, whilst at the same time Claremont rejected a proposed draft for the numerous young footballers who came from Perth's private schools but when not boarding lived in rural areas.

In anticipation of an AFL move planned in 1995 but not executed until 2000, the WASFL abolished the 50:50 sharing of gate revenue to allow the home team to keep all gate receipts. This helped some clubs like South Fremantle and Swan Districts, but along with the diversion of their former $250,000 league dividend to pay for the Eagles' licence had a severe effect off-field for struggling Perth, who announced in June they had to raise $100,000 to avoid folding at the end of the season.

The WASFL during the pre-season made a number of moves designed to resurrect its flagging appeal, including a television campaign aimed at the younger generation and a sponsorship deal with Pepsi. The league also adopted sponsorship naming for the first time and called itself the 'Pepsi Cup' for three seasons. To avoid conflict with television broadcasts of West Coast games, the WASFL played finals on Sunday for the first time, and the experiment was accepted despite attendances considered "poor".

On the playing field, 1990 saw the Gerard Neesham-coached Claremont become the first team since South Fremantle between 1950 and 1953 to record four consecutive minor premierships, only to be beaten for the fourth time in five encounters by a Swan Districts team boosted by the return of John Todd who had coached the Swans to a hat-trick of premierships in the middle 1980s. East Perth, after five years with only twenty-four victories from 105 matches and being lucky to not suffer four wooden spoons, returned to their former home of Perth Oval, cleaned out many of their established senior players and rose to fifth in a season with such a pronounced gap between the finalists and also-rans that the four was mathematically sealed with three rounds to go. On the other hand, West Perth, after the previous season making only its third finals series since 1978, lost their entire ruck and most of their goal-to-goal line and plummeted to its first wooden spoon since 1974 and only its second since 1939. A controversy over the clearance of Stephen Walsey (whose application was rejected by WASFL commissioner Brian Sierakowski but transferred after a fee was negotiated), Angelo del Borello and Frank del Casale from East Perth did not help the Falcons, but they did win only their second – and last as of 2025 – Colts premiership.

== Home-and-away season ==
=== Round 1 ===
	Round 1
Saturday, 31 March	Perth 13.16 (94)	def. by	Swan Districts 12.25 (97)	Lathlain Park (crowd: 3410)
Saturday, 31 March	East Perth 11.13 (79)	def. by	Subiaco 28.16 (184)	Perth Oval (crowd: 3410)
Saturday, 31 March	Claremont 14.11 (95)	def.	South Fremantle 13.10 (88)	Claremont Oval (crowd: 4280)
Saturday, 31 March	East Fremantle 23.17 (155)	def.	West Perth 10.9 (69)	East Fremantle Oval (crowd: 3103)
East Perth's return to Perth Oval with a banner proclaiming "Be It Ever So Humble — There's No Place Like Home" flops after the loss of Claremont recruit Peter Melesso at quarter-time: Subiaco kick 25 goals to six afterwards.; The 14-point total of the margins at each break at Lathlain Park is the smallest at that ground and has been equalled in the WA(S)FL only once since. Perth's more frequent errors and failure to get a goal in five minutes of continuous attack before the siren cost it a win.

=== Round 2 ===
	Round 2
Saturday, 7 April	Subiaco 9.8 (62)	def. by	Claremont 17.17 (119)	Subiaco Oval (crowd: 4150)
Saturday, 7 April	Swan Districts 18.24 (132)	def.	East Fremantle 16.13 (109)	Bassendean Oval (crowd: 3556)
Saturday, 7 April	West Perth 14.16 (100)	def. by	East Perth 19.10 (124)	Leederville Oval (crowd: 3137)
Saturday, 7 April	South Fremantle 14.13 (97)	def.	Perth 5.15 (45)	Fremantle Oval (crowd: 4825)
East Perth, with new recruits Craig McGrath, Melesso and Northern Territorian Noel Long (Note: Brother of Essendon champion Michael Long.) in the team, rebound from their opening thrashing via greater directness than the Falcons, for their first victory in twelve matches. (Note: The sequence was the Royals' longest losing sequence since their record of fifteen straight losses in 1929.); Teenage centre half forward Peter Mann shows up Subiaco's severe forward weaknesses – with veteran Laurie Keene especially out of form – to give Claremont an easy victory and question the merits of Subiaco's big opening win.

=== Round 3 (Easter weekend) ===
	Round 3
Saturday, 14 April	Swan Districts 22.23 (155)	def.	West Perth 14.5 (89)	Bassendean Oval (crowd: 4200)
Saturday, 14 April	East Fremantle 12.18 (90)	def. by	South Fremantle 17.9 (111)	East Fremantle Oval (crowd: 8200)
Monday, 16 April	East Perth 16.7 (103)	def.	Claremont 12.16 (88)	Perth Oval (crowd: 4088)
Monday, 16 April	Perth 15.10 (100)	def. by	Subiaco 22.18 (150)	Lathlain Park (crowd: 3840)
South Fremantle's depth – the envy of other WASFL clubs – gives it a convincing victory over an East Fremantle team affected by the controversial sacking of veteran champion Brian Peake.; West Perth coach George Michalczyk says his leading players were not match fit after Swan Districts overwhelm the Falcons for a loss that John Todd sees as redeeming the black and whites last-round displacement from the four in 1989.

=== Round 4 ===
	Round 4
Saturday, 21 April	South Fremantle 13.13 (91)	def. by	Swan Districts 18.15 (123)	Fremantle Oval (crowd: 5886)
Saturday, 21 April	East Perth 12.16 (88)	def. by	Perth 17.16 (118)	Perth Oval (crowd: 3351)
Saturday, 21 April	Subiaco 13.12 (90)	def. by	East Fremantle 16.14 (110)	Subiaco Oval (crowd: 3547)
Saturday, 21 April	Claremont 30.21 (201)	def.	West Perth 6.6 (42)	Claremont Oval (crowd: 3275)
The sight of Phil Narkle, Joe Ahmat and Don Langsford in their best form after injury and stints elsewhere reveals Swan Districts under Todd as back to their early-1980s best – on top and the sole undefeated team after four rounds.; Claremont record their biggest win over the Falcons, beating 102 points from 1964, and West Perth's second-biggest loss on record. Todd Ridley kicked ten goals against a depleted West Perth team that constantly played from behind.; West Perth's 0.3 (3) is the lowest WANFL/WAFL/WASFL second-half score since Swan Districts kicked 0.2 (2) – ironically against West Perth – in Round 5 of 1965.

=== Round 5 ===
	Round 5
Saturday, 28 April	Subiaco 22.13 (145)	def.	Swan Districts 20.10 (130)	Subiaco Oval (crowd: 4393)
Saturday, 28 April	Perth 9.9 (63)	def. by	Claremont 23.22 (160)	Lathlain Park (crowd: 3568)
Saturday, 28 April	West Perth 8.17 (65)	def. by	South Fremantle 19.16 (130)	Leederville Oval (crowd: 3044)
Saturday, 28 April	East Fremantle 14.19 (103)	def.	East Perth 13.14 (92)	East Fremantle Oval (crowd: 3249)
Ansett pilot and former VAFA player Jeremy Schmidt (Note: Schmidt had actually trialled for Essendon in practice matches before the 1986 VFL season but his commitments made it impossible for him to sign a contract.) provides spectacular high marking and combines with six goals each from Wayne Golding and fringe Eagle Andrew MacNish (soon to suffer a severe arm injury) to completely revitalise the Subiaco attack for a comeback win.; A brilliant run and goal from halfback by Falcon fan favourite "Terror" Dayman fails to revive the Falcons and South Fremantle's defence proved impossible to break by other means and brothers Maurice and Willie Rioli plus David Hart pick up possessions too easily.

=== Round 6 ===
	Round 6
Saturday, 5 May	Swan Districts 22.24 (156)	def.	East Perth 8.8 (56)	Bassendean Oval (crowd: 4557)
Saturday, 5 May	Perth 15.16 (106)	def. by	West Perth 17.20 (122)	WACA (crowd: 2600)
Saturday, 5 May	Claremont 13.14 (92)	def. by	East Fremantle 18.11 (119)	Claremont Oval (crowd: 4346)
Saturday, 5 May	South Fremantle 12.14 (86)	def.	Subiaco 11.15 (81)	Fremantle Oval (crowd: 4760)
East Fremantle show they have put the Peake sacking behind them with a fine win based upon hard attack upon the ball, which Claremont fail to counter with their skill.; Len Gandini – who began on the bench in a tactical ploy by Todd – has 26 kicks in three quarters as Swans record their biggest win over East Perth, beating 77 points from 1964.

=== Round 7 ===
	Round 7
Saturday, 12 May	West Perth 16.12 (108)	def.	Subiaco 15.14 (104)	Leederville Oval (crowd: 2859)
Saturday, 12 May	Swan Districts 14.14 (98)	def.	Claremont 12.11 (83)	WACA (crowd: 5354)
Saturday, 12 May	East Fremantle 21.11 (137)	def.	Perth 10.9 (69)	East Fremantle Oval (crowd: 2907)
Saturday, 12 May	East Perth 19.16 (130)	def.	South Fremantle 11.13 (79)	Perth Oval (crowd: 2136)
Swan Districts gain its first victory over Claremont since 1986 (they drew in 1988) as Steve Bazzo completely shields ex-Swan and West Coast discard Joe Cormack and Claremont's on-ball prowess is broken down for the second consecutive round.; South Fremantle's insipid performance leads coach Stan Magro to blast his players as the hot-and-cold Royals play with infinitely more desire and Melesso shuts down rookie sensation Glen Jakovich.

=== Round 8 ===
	Round 8
Saturday, 19 May	Swan Districts 25.19 (169)	def.	Perth 8.6 (54)	Bassendean Oval (crowd: 3314)
Saturday, 19 May	Subiaco 10.14 (74)	def.	East Perth 7.15 (57)	Subiaco Oval (crowd: 3370)
Saturday, 19 May	South Fremantle 11.9 (75)	def. by	Claremont 11.19 (85)	Fremantle Oval (crowd: 5136)
Saturday, 19 May	West Perth 15.14 (104)	def.	East Fremantle 14.12 (96)	Leederville Oval (crowd: 3203)
Ex-Swan Districts star and rookie Perth coach Tom Mullooly is openly critical of his players' commitment after the black and whites overwhelm his team, saying that on match days they have unlearned what he teaches them despite training very well.; Burracoppin farmer Graham Kerse shows West Perth have overcome the difficult loss of centreman Menaglio from 1989, as his skill allows West Perth to overpower East Fremantle after a poor start.

=== Round 9 ===
	Round 9
Saturday, 26 May	Claremont 19.12 (126)	def.	Subiaco 9.8 (62)	Claremont Oval (crowd: 2783)
Saturday, 26 May	East Perth 16.11 (107)	def.	West Perth 5.15 (45)	Perth Oval (crowd: 3050)
Saturday, 26 May	Perth 10.15 (75)	def.	South Fremantle 7.8 (50)	Lathlain Park (crowd: 1970)
Saturday, 26 May	East Fremantle 8.14 (62)	def. by	Swan Districts 15.14 (104)	East Fremantle Oval (crowd: 3000)
A frightening collision with Stephen Hooper leaves West Perth's sole ruckman Basil Zempalis out of the game with a collapsed lung, and the Falcons' chances disappear as Hooper – suspended for four matches at the following tribunal meeting – takes complete control in the ruck and allows the Royal centreline total control.; Perth kick 7.6 (48) with a strong wind in the first quarter before the revitalised Brian Peake has eleven kicks in the second quarter to restrict South Fremantle to three behinds with the wind in a heavy rain shower that prevents the Bulldogs coming back.

=== Round 10 (Foundation Day) ===
	Round 10
Saturday, 2 June	Claremont 29.10 (184)	def.	East Perth 13.12 (90)	Claremont Oval (crowd: 3592)
Saturday, 2 June	West Perth 17.17 (119)	def.	Swan Districts 11.12 (78)	Leederville Oval (crowd: 4691)
Monday, 4 June	South Fremantle 12.13 (85)	def.	East Fremantle 11.6 (72)	Fremantle Oval (crowd: 11536)
Monday, 4 June	Subiaco 12.14 (86)	def.	Perth 9.18 (72)	Subiaco Oval (crowd: 3620)
Angular ruckman Stephen Walsey, playing for the first time after a clearance dispute with East Perth, easily beats Travis Edmonds and Shane Strempel to secure an upset victory for the Falcons.; The 114-point second quarter aggregate, with Claremont kicking 12.4 and East Perth 6.2, is an all-time WAFL/WANFL/WASFL/Westar record for a second quarter. East Perth discard Nathan Brooks shows superb skill in delivering the ball, whilst Joe Cormack roves superbly for seven goals.

=== Round 11 ===
	Round 11
Friday, 8 June (6:45 pm)	East Fremantle 18.17 (125)	def.	Subiaco 13.15 (93)	WACA (crowd: 2150)
Saturday, 9 June	West Perth 10.7 (67)	def. by	Claremont 27.17 (179)	Leederville Oval (crowd: 3084)
Saturday, 9 June	Perth 12.13 (85)	def.	East Perth 11.16 (82)	Lathlain Park (crowd: 2158)
Saturday, 9 June	Swan Districts 17.7 (109)	def. by	South Fremantle 18.9 (117)	Bassendean Oval (crowd: 3611)
Five days after a bruising local derby, South Fremantle – down to eighteen fit men due to injuries – produce a superb display of stamina to get over a Swan Districts team rebounding from their loss to West Perth.; Claremont virtually end hopes of a Falcon revival with a second crushing win, marred only by a six-goal Falcon burst late in the second quarter. With this win, Claremont had won their last four encounters by an average of 112 points.

=== Round 12 ===
	Round 12
Saturday, 16 June	Claremont 16.15 (111)	def.	Perth 11.11 (77)	Claremont Oval (crowd: 2948)
Saturday, 16 June	East Perth 10.10 (70)	def. by	East Fremantle 21.11 (137)	Perth Oval (crowd: 2787)
Saturday, 16 June	South Fremantle 18.9 (117)	def.	West Perth 12.16 (88)	Fremantle Oval (crowd: 3906)
Saturday, 16 June	Swan Districts 18.21 (129)	def.	Subiaco 12.13 (85)	Bassendean Oval (crowd: 3924)
Veteran forward Brett Hutton fires the Swans into action before cracking his ribs, turning a dour battled that sharply contrasted with the clubs' Round 5 shootout into an easy win.; Maurice and Willie Rioli show their 1989 skills for the first time to put the Bulldogs two wins clear inside the four – though South Fremantle's defence wins the most praise.

=== Round 13 ===
	Round 13
Saturday, 23 June	Subiaco 10.13 (73)	def. by	South Fremantle 12.11 (83)	Subiaco Oval (crowd: 3029)
Saturday, 23 June	East Perth 13.6 (84)	def. by	Swan Districts 13.17 (95)	WACA (crowd: 2592)
Saturday, 23 June	West Perth 18.7 (115)	def. by	Perth 23.12 (150)	Leederville Oval (crowd: 2500)
Saturday, 23 June	East Fremantle 8.19 (67)	def. by	Claremont 14.15 (99)	East Fremantle Oval (crowd: 3651)
South Fremantle make an amazing comeback from 0.5 (5) to 7.9 (51) behind in time-on of the second quarter, shattering the Lions as 1986 Teal Cup star Richard Graham finally fulfils his promise.; Perth take a first step towards solving their severe financial plight when they prove too good for West Perth after an even first half. Falcon coach Michalczyk orders a 6:00 a.m. Wednesday training run as a response to this collapse.

=== Round 14 ===
	Round 14
Saturday, 30 June	Subiaco 5.12 (42)	def. by	West Perth 16.15 (111)	Subiaco Oval (crowd: 2574)
Saturday, 30 June	South Fremantle 12.19 (91)	def.	East Perth 12.11 (83)	Fremantle Oval (crowd: 3026)
Saturday, 30 June	Perth 14.24 (108)	def.	East Fremantle 10.9 (69)	Lathlain Park (crowd: 2401)
Saturday, 30 June	Swan Districts 12.6 (78)	def.	Claremont 9.21 (75)	Bassendean Oval (crowd: 4786)
Swan Districts become the first club to win for a second time with the record deficit of twelve fewer scoring shots. Their post-game celebration of a dour, close-checking win is compared by critics to that occurring in the concurrent soccer World Cup.; Perth's severe off-field trouble again appears to rally the club as 1987 Sandover Medallist Mark Watson returns to that season's form with almost 40 possessions.; West Perth move off the bottom by humiliating a depleted Subiaco, with full-forwards Matt Cullen, whom Subiaco rudely said they did not want, leading a powerful goal-to-goal line with five majors.

=== Round 15 ===
	Round 15
Saturday, 14 July	Perth 10.12 (72)	def. by	Swan Districts 13.15 (93)	Lathlain Park (crowd: 2938)
Saturday, 14 July	East Perth 17.16 (118)	def.	Subiaco 11.10 (76)	Perth Oval (crowd: 2913)
Saturday, 14 July	Claremont 6.18 (54)	def. by	South Fremantle 11.17 (83)	Claremont Oval (crowd: 3362)
Saturday, 14 July	East Fremantle 17.10 (112)	def.	West Perth 10.11 (71)	East Fremantle Oval (crowd: 2000)
South's physical, low-to-the-ground play in the rain sees them never in danger against an inaccurate Tiger outfit who miss thirteen shots before their first goal 29 minutes into the second quarter. At half-forward, Maurice Rioli shows himself still one of the best wet-weather footballers in the business, whilst Craig Edwards is outstanding in the ruck.; The agile Shane Strempel – at one point the WASFL's leading goalkicker – proves the crucial stumbling block for Perth, whose defeat already has the four looking sealed with six rounds to be contested.

=== Round 16 ===
	Round 16
Saturday, 21 July	South Fremantle 18.11 (119)	def.	Perth 13.7 (85)	Fremantle Oval (crowd: 2113)
Saturday, 21 July	West Perth 7.10 (52)	def. by	East Perth 21.20 (146)	Leederville Oval (crowd: 2100)
Saturday, 21 July	Subiaco 10.11 (71)	def. by	Claremont 15.19 (109)	Subiaco Oval (crowd: 2069)
Saturday, 21 July	Swan Districts 9.16 (70)	def. by	East Fremantle 14.9 (93)	Bassendean Oval (crowd: 2172)
South Fremantle produce another notable comeback, kicking 13.5 (83) to 3.3 (21) in tough conditions after half-time, as 1989 Sandover Medallist Edwards dominates the Demon rucks.; Ron Wilcox' policy of playing Clinton Browning at the end favoured by the wind throughout the match is a winner: the former Eagle and future Simpson Medallist beats a different opponent each quarter, brings the ball to his smaller men, and shows the Sharks will not "make up the numbers" in the finals.; Stephen Hooper dominates his rematch with the Falcons as conclusively as in the ninth round, leaving West Perth powerless to avoid their second consecutive thrashing from their traditional rivals.

=== Round 17 ===
	Round 17
Saturday, 28 July	Swan Districts 10.10 (70)	def. by	West Perth 14.13 (97)	Bassendean Oval (crowd: 2778)
Saturday, 28 July	Perth 12.11 (83)	def.	Subiaco 9.11 (65)	Lathlain Park (crowd: 2070)
Saturday, 28 July	East Perth 7.11 (53)	def. by	Claremont 23.14 (152)	Perth Oval (crowd: 2217)
Sunday, 29 July	East Fremantle 18.20 (128)	def.	South Fremantle 10.14 (74)	East Fremantle Oval (crowd: 10148)
Claremont's small men, led by Evans and Cormack, seal the four by crushing the improving Royals via immaculate passing of such skill that the Tigers seldom experience pressure. John Hutton backed them up with six goals.; Swan Districts' forwards and defenders line up at the wrong end upon the opening bounce (possibly as a ploy by Todd) and the Swans never get in touch after two early Falcon goals – leading Todd to say West Perth always lift themselves for the black and whites.

=== Round 18 ===
	Round 18
Saturday, 4 August	South Fremantle 16.20 (116)	def.	Swan Districts 13.12 (90)	Fremantle Oval (crowd: 3139)
Saturday, 4 August	East Perth 18.14 (122)	def.	Perth 15.14 (104)	Perth Oval (crowd: 1736)
Saturday, 4 August	Claremont 20.11 (131)	def.	West Perth 12.10 (82)	Claremont Oval (crowd: 2307)
Saturday, 4 August	Subiaco 13.13 (91)	def. by	East Fremantle 23.13 (151)	Subiaco Oval (crowd: 2300)
After nagging injuries earlier in 1990, Scott Watters shows his best form for South Fremantle, and the Bulldogs move to within percentage of the double chance with the easiest draw of the three contenders.

=== Round 19 ===
	Round 19
Saturday, 11 August	Subiaco 14.12 (96)	def. by	Swan Districts 16.15 (111)	Subiaco Oval (crowd: 2219)
Saturday, 11 August	West Perth 13.11 (89)	def. by	South Fremantle 25.10 (160)	Leederville Oval (crowd: 2246)
Saturday, 11 August	East Fremantle 12.16 (88)	def.	East Perth 11.11 (77)	East Fremantle Oval (crowd: 2537)
Saturday, 11 August	Perth 11.12 (78)	def. by	Claremont 16.20 (116)	Lathlain Park (crowd: 3055)
Brian Peake becomes the second West Australian to reach 400 senior games, (Note: Barry Cable was the first, in the nineteenth round of 1979. Both totals include games played for VFL clubs (North Melbourne and Geelong respectively).) and has eleven possessions in the centre in the first quarter to inspire Perth to a superb display, before Claremont predictably overwhelm the Demons as Peake's influence dwindles.

=== Round 20 ===
	Round 20
Saturday, 18 August	South Fremantle 18.13 (121)	def.	Subiaco 11.9 (75)	Fremantle Oval (crowd: 2415)
Saturday, 18 August	Perth 15.11 (101)	def.	West Perth 13.13 (91)	Lathlain Park (crowd: 1658)
Saturday, 18 August	Swan Districts 6.15 (51)	def. by	East Perth 14.13 (97)	Bassendean Oval (crowd: 2655)
Saturday, 18 August	Claremont 12.11 (83)	def.	East Fremantle 9.15 (69)	Claremont Oval (crowd: 2966)
Claremont produce a brilliant last quarter into a strong wind to seal their second semi-final berth. Veteran Peter Thorns scores three goals of Claremont's total of 6.3 (39) to 0.5 (5), whilst East Fremantle forwards Clinton Browning and Andrew Lockyer combine for 1.7 (13).; Swans' lack of desire recalls their 1989 collapse – after a good first quarter into the gale they relax and allow East Perth complete control and give South Fremantle second position.; West Perth score nine goals in the first quarter, but Perth come back to move out of the wooden spoon danger zone in a match marred by the report of Perth defender Gavin Whittington for manhandling the shirt of umpire Sam Kronja. Whittington received four weeks for the change, which was a first in the WA(S)FL for many years.

=== Round 21 ===
	Round 21
Saturday, 25 August	West Perth 15.10 (100)	def. by	Subiaco 21.10 (136)	Leederville Oval (crowd: 2209)
Saturday, 25 August	East Perth 17.13 (115)	def.	South Fremantle 12.16 (88)	Perth Oval (crowd: 3527)
Saturday, 25 August	East Fremantle 18.14 (122)	def.	Perth 4.14 (38)	East Fremantle Oval (crowd: 2866)
Saturday, 25 August	Claremont 17.12 (114)	def. by	Swan Districts 17.19 (121)	Claremont Oval (crowd: 3991)
In a match directly determining the wooden spoon owing to the Lions' large percentage advantage, Subiaco are never headed and end a ten-match losing streak.; Swan Districts recapture the double chance with two goals in the last minute after dominating the earlier part of the quarter for 4.10 (34). Brett Hutton – earlier beaten at full-back by namesake John – and Todd Menegola prove matchwinners.

== Ladder ==
1990 WASFL ladder
Pos	Team	Pld	W	L	D	PF	PA	PP	Pts
1	Claremont	21	15	6	0	2456	1648	149.0	60
2	Swan Districts (P)	21	14	7	0	2259	1948	116.0	56
3	South Fremantle	21	14	7	0	2061	1850	111.4	56
4	East Fremantle	21	13	8	0	2214	1822	121.5	52
5	East Perth	21	9	12	0	1973	2150	91.8	36
6	Perth	21	7	14	0	1777	2261	78.6	28
7	Subiaco	21	6	15	0	1941	2228	87.1	24
8	West Perth	21	6	15	0	1826	2600	70.2	24

Rules for classification: 1) points; 2) percentage; 3) number of points for.
(P) Premiers

== Finals ==
=== First semi-final ===
	First semi-final
Sunday, 2 September	South Fremantle 22.15 (147)	def.	East Fremantle 19.14 (128)	Subiaco Oval (crowd: 15,799)
Stan Magro's gamble in playing four not-fully-fit players pays off, as Stevan Jackson and Glen Jakovich dominate the key forward positions and Peter Matera adds four more majors as the Sharks cannot counter the Bulldogs' dominance of the central corridor.

=== Second semi-final ===
	Second semi-final
Sunday, 9 September	Claremont 10.14 (74)	def.	Swan Districts 9.13 (67)	Subiaco Oval (crowd: 12,720)
In warm but slippery conditions, Gerard Neesham's coaching skill and the long kicking of fringe Eagle Don Pyke has Swans virtually paralysed until the last fifteen minutes when four late goals flatter the black and whites.

=== Preliminary final ===
	Preliminary final
Sunday, 16 September	Swan Districts 19.15 (129)	def.	South Fremantle 15.12 (102)	Subiaco Oval (crowd: 14,241)
Ken Bell keeps rookie ruckman Travis Edmonds in the reserves, (Note: Swans' reserves lost to South Fremantle by two points in that grade's preliminary final.) and his triumph over formidable South pair Edwards and Nalder ensures a Grand Final berth.

=== Grand Final ===
1990 WASFL Grand Final
Sunday, 23 September	Claremont	def. by	Swan Districts	Subiaco Oval (crowd: 26,541)
4.8 (32); 7.8 (50); 8.9 (57); 10.17 (77)	Q1; Q2; Q3; Final	4.1 (25); 11.3 (69); 16.5 (101); 16.7 (103)	Umpires: Phillip O'Reilly, Grant Vernon; Simpson Medal: Greg Walker (Swan Districts)
Evans 2, Mitchell, Thorne, Cormack, Guard, David O'Connell, Rowland, Fitzgerald, Mann	Goals	Strempel 4, Andy Holmes 3, Walker 2, Ogg 2, Hodyl, Hutton, Passeri, Menegola, Retzlaff
Hann, Rowland, Evans, Guard, Panizera, Higgins, Mann	Best	Gow, Walker, Strempel, Narkle, Perry, Retzlaff, Eaton, Passeri
Peter Higgins for striking Andy Holmes	Reports
John Todd and semi-retired veterans Don Holmes, Don Langsford, Brett Hutton and Phil Narkle defeat Claremont for a third time in the Grand Final, two years after Swans were wooden spooners. The Simpson Medal goes to the son of Swans' greatest player and then-president, Bill Walker.
