= Scott Crow (disambiguation) =

Scott Crow is a former Australian rules footballer.

Scott Crow may also refer to:

- Scott Crow (author), Texan anarchist and activist, known for political commentary and helping to organize the Common Ground Collective
- Scott Crowe, competed in 2012 Oceania Athletics Championships
