= Menegola =

Menegola is a surname. Notable people with the surname include:

- Sam Menegola (born 1992), Australian rules footballer
- Todd Menegola (born 1967), Australian rules footballer
