= David Donato =

David Donato may refer to:

- David Donato (singer), American singer for White Tiger and Black Sabbath
- David Donato (footballer) (born 1970), Australian rules footballer
