= Jamie Shanahan =

Australian rules footballer (born 1967)

Personal information
- Born: 6 December 1967 (age 58)
- Original team: Hobart (TFL)
- Debut: Round 3, 5 April 1992, St Kilda vs. West Coast, at Subiaco Oval
- Height: 194 cm (6 ft 4 in)
- Weight: 102 kg (225 lb)

Playing career^{1}
Years	Club	Games (Goals)
1992–1997	St Kilda	125 (0)
1998–1999	Melbourne	37 (0)
Total		162 (0)
- ^{1} Playing statistics correct to the end of 1999.

James Shanahan (born 6 December 1967) is a former Australian rules footballer who played for St Kilda and Melbourne in the Australian Football League (AFL).

== Early career ==
He played with Hobart in the Tasmanian Football League from 1986 to 1990 and was in Hobart's 1990 TFL Premiership side, then also spent some time with Fitzroy pre-season in 1986 and had played with the Fitzroy reserves (at least one game at North Hobart) and became a police officer in Tasmania, when he was granted extended leave to play AFL.

== St Kilda ==
Picked up as a late pick in the 1990 AFL draft (pick 92), Shanahan spent two seasons with St Kilda's reserves before debuting in 1992 with the St Kilda Football Club. Shanahan played in St Kilda's 1996 AFL Ansett Australia Cup winning side – the club's first AFL Cup win. He was a tall, solid defender and was valuable to the club. Shanahan played in 22 of 22 matches in the 1997 AFL Premiership Season home and away rounds in which St Kilda Football Club qualified in first position for the 1997 AFL Finals Series, winning the club's 2nd Minor Premiership and 1st McClelland Trophy. His peak came in 1997 with the Saints when he performed brilliantly at full-back, but during the 1997 AFL Grand Final he suffered from a goal onslaught by Adelaide matchwinners Darren Jarman and Shane Ellen. Many St Kilda supporters still cringe at then-coach Stan Alves' refusal to move Shanahan off Jarman, who kicked five last quarter goals to win the Grand Final for Adelaide.

== Melbourne ==
After the 1997 season had finished, Shanahan moved to the Melbourne Football Club due to the Saints not granting the then 30-year-old's request for a long-term contract. He played out his career at the Demons and played his last game at the end of 1999. He played at full back and did not score any goals in his career, only five behinds, one in 1996 and four in 1997.
