= Mark McLeod (Australian footballer) =

Australian rules footballer

Personal information
- Full name: Mark McLeod
- Born: 27 December 1968 (age 57)
- Original team: Notting Hill
- Draft: 1. 47, 1991 Pre-season Draft, Hawthorn

Playing career^{1}
Years	Club	Games (Goals)
1989	Richmond	3 (0)
- ^{1} Playing statistics correct to the end of 1989.

Mark McLeod (born 27 December 1968) is a former Australian rules footballer who played three games for Richmond in the Victorian Football League (VFL) in 1989. He was recruited from Notting Hill. He was later drafted by the Hawthorn Football Club with the 47th selection in the 1991 Pre-season Draft but did not play a league game for Hawthorn.
