= David Donato (footballer) =

Australian rules footballer

Personal information
- Full name: David Donato
- Born: 7 September 1970 (age 56)
- Original team: Clarence
- Draft: 3rd, 1990 AFL draft
- Height: 178 cm (5 ft 10 in)
- Weight: 75 kg (165 lb)

Playing career^{1}
Years	Club	Games (Goals)
1991	Fitzroy	12 (2)
- ^{1} Playing statistics correct to the end of 1991.

David Donato (born 7 September 1970) is a former Australian rules footballer who played with Fitzroy in the Australian Football League (AFL).

Donato was taken at pick three in the 1990 AFL draft, behind Stephen Hooper and fellow Tasmanian James Cook. Like them, Donato had only a brief league career, with all his games coming in the second half of the 1991 season, from which he averaged 12 disposals.

He finished his football career back at his original club, Clarence.
