= Ben Robertson (footballer) =

Australian rules footballer (born 1971)

Personal information
- Full name: Ben Robertson
- Born: 14 August 1971 (age 55)
- Original team: Noble Park
- Draft: 30th overall, 1991 Pre-Season Draft
- Height: 178 cm (5 ft 10 in)
- Weight: 74 kg (163 lb)
- Position: Rover

Playing career^{1}
Years	Club	Games (Goals)
1991–1994	Carlton	3 (2)
- ^{1} Playing statistics correct to the end of 1994.

Ben Robertson (born 14 August 1971) is a former Australian rules footballer who played for the Carlton Football Club in the Australian Football League (AFL). Robertson played three senior games in his first season with Carlton, but was unable break into the senior side in 1993 or 1994 and was delisted at the conclusion of the 1994 season. In 1995, he moved to South Australia to play for North Adelaide in the South Australian National Football League.

Robertson's daughter Meg Robertson was drafted by Carlton at the 2024 AFL Women's draft under the father-daughter rule.
