= Paul Sharkey =

Australian rules footballer

Personal information
- Full name: Paul Sharkey
- Born: 8 June 1974 (age 52)
- Original team: Sandhurst / Catholic College Bendigo
- Draft: 22nd, 1990 AFL draft
- Height: 190 cm (6 ft 3 in)
- Weight: 92 kg (203 lb)
- Position: Defender

Playing career^{1}
Years	Club	Games (Goals)
1994–1997	Collingwood	26 (4)
- ^{1} Playing statistics correct to the end of 1997.

Paul Sharkey (born 8 June 1974) is a former Australian rules footballer who played with Collingwood in the Australian Football League (AFL) during the 1990s.

Sharkey was only 16 when he came to Collingwood from Bendigo, after being secured with the 22nd pick of the 1990 AFL draft. He didn't make his league debut until 1994 and made ten appearances in total for the season, including a qualifying final against West Coast. A tall defender, he played just once in 1995 but added another ten games in 1996.

He was traded to Hawthorn Football Club prior to the 1998 season, in exchange for Shannon Gibson. Sharkey however wouldn't play another AFL game and saw out the decade at the Bendigo Bombers.

Appeared on an episode of Family Feud alongside his wife, mother and daughter in 2011.
