= Sean Ralphsmith =

Australian rules footballer

Personal information
- Full name: Sean James Ralphsmith
- Born: 14 December 1966 (age 59)
- Original team: Haileybury College
- Height: 188 cm (6 ft 2 in)
- Weight: 90 kg (198 lb)

Playing career^{1}
Years	Club	Games (Goals)
1988, 1990	Hawthorn	4 (3)
1991–1994	St Kilda	30 (5)
Total		34 (8)
- ^{1} Playing statistics correct to the end of 1994.

Sean Ralphsmith (born 14 December 1966) is a former Australian rules footballer who played with Hawthorn and St Kilda in the Victorian/Australian Football League (VFL/AFL).

Ralphsmith had 18 disposals and kicked three goals on his AFL debut in 1988, but didn't make another appearance until 1990. A Haileybury College recruit, he was one of two Hawthorn players traded to St Kilda in the 1991 pre-season, with the other being traded with Russell Morris.

As a defender at St Kilda, Ralphsmith finally played some regular senior football, playing 13 games in 1991. He made a further nine appearances in 1992, including two finals, at an average of over 19 disposals a game. He performed extremely well in St Kilda's elimination final win over Collingwood.

Ralphsmith now works as an executive for GWA in Australia. He is married with two children, Maisie and Hugo. Hugo was drafted with pick 46 to the Richmond Football Club in the 2019 AFL draft
