= Jamie Lamb =

Australian rules footballer

Personal information
- Full name: Jamie Lamb
- Born: 13 April 1968 (age 58)
- Original team: Ballarat
- Height: 187 cm (6 ft 2 in)
- Weight: 75 kg (165 lb)

Playing career^{1}
Years	Club	Games (Goals)
1986–1990	St Kilda	33 (7)
1991–1993	Geelong	14 (4)
Total		47 (11)
- ^{1} Playing statistics correct to the end of 1993.

Jamie Lamb (born 13 April 1968) is a former Australian rules footballer who played with St Kilda and Geelong in the Victorian/Australian Football League (VFL/AFL).

Lamb never played more than half a season at St Kilda, the most appearances he made was 10 games in 1989. One of his best performances came in a win over the Sydney Swans in 1990, at Moorabbin Oval, where he had a career best 29 disposals and kicked three goals. He joined Geelong via the 1991 Pre-Season Draft and took part in their 1991 finals campaign. His three finals that year included the preliminary final loss to the West Coast Eagles.
