= Mark McQueen =

Australian rules footballer

Personal information
- Full name: Mark McQueen
- Born: 9 January 1970 (age 56)
- Original team: North Hobart (TFL)
- Draft: No. 42, 1990 National Draft
- Height: 187 cm (6 ft 2 in)
- Weight: 95 kg (209 lb)

Playing career^{1}
Years	Club	Games (Goals)
1991–1994	Richmond	34 (14)
- ^{1} Playing statistics correct to the end of 1994.

Mark McQueen (born 9 January 1970) is a former Australian rules footballer who played with Richmond in the Australian Football League (AFL). McQueen started his career at Sandy Bay in the Tasmanian Football League between 1986 and 1987.

McQueen, a defender, won the best and fairest award at Tasmanian Football League (TFL) club North Hobart in 1988 and 1990.

In the 1990 AFL National Draft, McQueen was selected by Richmond, with pick 42. After making his senior debut in 1991, McQueen was a regular fixture in the senior team in 1992 AFL season, when he played 18 games.

After his delistment from Richmond, McQueen transferred to South Australian National Football League (SANFL) club Woodville-West Torrens.
