= Matthew Bourke =

Australian rules footballer

Personal information
- Full name: Matthew Bourke
- Born: 9 September 1968 (age 58)
- Original team: Xavier College
- Height: 187 cm (6 ft 2 in)
- Weight: 76 kg (168 lb)

Playing career^{1}
Years	Club	Games (Goals)
1989	Hawthorn	1 (0)
1991	Fitzroy	2 (2)
Total		3 (2)
- ^{1} Playing statistics correct to the end of 1991.

Matthew Bourke (born 9 September 1968) is a former Australian rules footballer who played with Hawthorn and Fitzroy in the Australian Football League (AFL).

Recruited from Xavier College, Bourke made his debut in round 10 of the 1989 VFL season, against the West Coast Eagles at Subiaco. It was his only appearance for Hawthorn, unable to get back into a side which went on to claim the premiership. He didn't feature at all in the 1990 season and was then selected by Fitzroy at pick three in the 1991 Pre-Season Draft. In 1991 he made two appearances with Fitzroy, in rounds two and three.
