= Allen Jakovich =

Australian rules footballer, born 1968

Personal information
- Full name: Allen John Jakovich
- Nickname: Jaka
- Born: 21 March 1968 (age 58); Western Australia
- Original teams: South Fremantle (WAFL), Southern Districts (NTFL), Woodville (SANFL).
- Draft: No. 6, 1990 National draft, Melbourne; No. 9, 1995 National draft, Footscray
- Height: 187 cm (6 ft 2 in)
- Weight: 98 kg (216 lb)
- Position: Forward

Playing career^{1}
Years	Club	Games (Goals)
1985–1986	South Fremantle - WAFL	7 (22)
1988–1990	Southern Districts - NTFL	23 (125)
1989–1990	Woodville - SANFL	38 (186)
1991–1994	Melbourne	47 (201)
1996	Footscray	7 (7)
Total		122 (541)
- ^{1} Playing statistics correct to the end of 1996.

Career highlights
- Melbourne leading Goalkicker: 1991, 1992, 1993; Harold Ball Memorial Trophy: 1991

Allen John Jakovich (/dʒækəvɪtʃ/) (born 21 March 1968) is a retired Australian rules football player. Jakovich was a prolific full forward and is notable for kicking 208 goals in his 54 Australian Football League matches, an average of 3.85 per game, for Melbourne and Footscray. He and his younger brother, Glen Jakovich, both began their AFL careers in the 1990 AFL draft.

Jakovich grew up in Western Australia and played football with clubs in Western Australia, the Northern Territory, South Australia and Victoria. He is of Croatian descent.

== Early career ==
Allen Jakovich was the second of three sons for Darko and Mary Jakovich. Allen represented Western Australia in 1983 for the Secondary Schools U15 competition. He played alongside Chris Lewis, Andrew McGovern, Paul Peos and Chris Waterman who would also go on to play AFL.

Allen played in the 1985 Teal Cup football team for Western Australia. Allen played alongside future West Coast Eagles players Chris Lewis, Paul Peos, Guy McKenna, Chris Waterman, Scott Watters, Peter Sumich and John Worsfold in what was Western Australia's first Teal Cup win. Although playing well in Western Australia's first two games against Queensland and NSW, Allen Jakovich only scored a single goal in the final against Victoria and was replaced halfway through the 3rd quarter.

Allen followed his older brother Garry (4 Senior Games in 1984) and began his senior career with South Fremantle in the West Australian Football League. Over the 1985 and 1986 seasons, Allen played 7 games in the seniors and kicked 22 Goals at an average of 3.14 goals per game. As of 2025 this was the 9th best goals per game average for the club. Noting that Mark Jackson is in 10th place with 100 goals from 32 games (3.13 goals per game). Also noting that no player since Allen Jakovich played has had more goals per game for the club.

Allen kicked 62 goals for the Colts 1984 season and was an important part of the Bulldogs premiership victory. In Round 4 of the 1985 Season for the Colts, Allen kicked 10 goals against Subiaco.

Jakovich left the club in 1987.

He then played in towns in outback Western Australia such as Port Hedland and Kalgoorlie. It was while playing at Port Hedland that Allen Jakovich met Brian Hood who was the Coach of the NTFL team Southern Districts. Brian convinced Allen to join Southern Districts for the 1988/1989 season.

== NTFL career ==
He then played in the Northern Territory Football League, including the 1988/89 season in which he kicked 104 goals for Southern Districts.

== SANFL career ==
Jakovich later moved to South Australia and played in the South Australian National Football League (SANFL) playing for Woodville. In the 1989 season he kicked 85 goals. In the 1990 season he kicked 101 goals. It was this performance that drew the attention of Melbourne Football Club talent scouts.

== AFL career ==
1991 Season

He debuted in the seniors in round 1 against the West Coast Eagles at Subiaco but was quickly dropped for the following week. Jakovich played in the Melbourne reserves and dominated the reserves competition in the first half of the 1991 season.

In the second half, though, he burst out convincingly and big hauls came on an almost weekly basis for the rest of the season making a big impression in the league with his confident playing style. A high point was a near single handed defeat of North Melbourne where he kicked 11 goals (including a miraculous scissor kick out of mid-air from twenty metres out, a certain goal of the year candidate), 8 behinds and one out on the full. This effort also earned Jakovich the distinction of being the fastest player to score his first fifty goals, taking only nine games to do so. He finished with 71 goals for his debut season; becoming one of a handful of players in VFL/AFL history to kick 50 goals in both the senior competition and now defunct 'reserves' league within the same season.

1992 Season

He kicked his 100th career goal in his 21st game, equalling the record held by John Coleman.

1993 Season

He kissed his brother Glen during a match between Melbourne and the West Coast Eagles at the MCG.

1994 Season

Over the past three years at Melbourne he balanced some mercurial performances with fitness problems and indifferent form. He was let go at the start of 1995, due to a persistent back injury.

1995 Season

He spent the year out of the game recovering from a back injury before being drafted by the Footscray Football Club.

1996 Season

An ill-fated comeback that lasted barely half a season.

In his AFL career, he kicked 208 goals and 173 behinds.

== Statistics ==
Legend
G	Goals	K	Kicks	D	Disposals	T	Tackles
B	Behinds	H	Handballs	M	Marks

Season	Team	No.	Games	Totals							Averages (per game)							Votes
Season	Team	No.	Games	G	B	K	H	D	M	T	G	B	K	H	D	M	T	Votes
1991	Melbourne	13	14	71	57	177	10	187	92	3	5.1	4.1	12.6	0.7	13.4	6.6	0.2	10
1992	Melbourne	13	11	40	37	115	9	124	66	1	3.6	3.4	10.5	0.8	11.3	6.0	0.1	1
1993	Melbourne	13	9	39	34	93	18	111	57	3	4.3	3.8	10.3	2.0	12.3	6.3	0.3	3
1994	Melbourne	13	13	51	31	123	17	140	82	5	3.9	2.4	9.5	1.3	10.8	6.3	0.4	1
1996	Footscray	13	7	7	14	29	4	33	16	0	1.0	2.0	4.1	0.6	4.7	2.3	0.0	0
Career			54	208	173	537	58	595	313	12	3.9	3.2	9.9	1.1	11.0	5.8	0.2	15

== Post-football career ==
He has largely been out of the public eye since the late 1990s, except for a one-off appearance on The Footy Show. and in a wide-ranging interview on the Demonland podcast in 2017 and also two appearances on The Front Bar in 2018.
