= John Mrakov =

Australian rules footballer

Personal information
- Full name: John Mrakov
- Born: 17 November 1968 (age 57)
- Original team: Wanderers (Preston)
- Height: 189 cm (6 ft 2 in)
- Weight: 91 kg (201 lb)

Playing career^{1}
Years	Club	Games (Goals)
1987–1990	Collingwood	3 (0)
1991	Richmond	8 (0)
Total		11 (0)
- ^{1} Playing statistics correct to the end of 1991.

John Mrakov (born 17 November 1968) is a former Australian rules footballer who played with Collingwood and Richmond in the Victorian/Australian Football League (VFL/AFL).

Mrakov was recruited from the Wanderers Football Club in Victoria.

He played three games for Collingwood, one in 1987 and the other two in 1989.

Richmond secured Mrakov in the 1991 Pre-Season Draft and he made eight appearances in the 1991 AFL season.
