= Nigel Palfreyman =

Australian rules footballer

Personal information
- Full name: Nigel Palfreyman
- Born: 2 October 1973 (age 53)
- Original team: Sandy Bay (TFL)
- Draft: 39th, 1990 AFL draft
- Height: 186 cm (6 ft 1 in)
- Weight: 77 kg (170 lb)

Playing career^{1}
Years	Club	Games (Goals)
1992	Brisbane Bears	15 (7)
1994	Fitzroy	1 (0)
Total		16 (7)
- ^{1} Playing statistics correct to the end of 1994.

Nigel Palfreyman (born 2 October 1973) is a former Australian rules footballer who played with the Brisbane Bears and Fitzroy in the Australian Football League (AFL).

Originally from Tasmanian Football League (TFL) club Sandy Bay, Palfreyman was drafted by Brisbane in the 1990 AFL draft. He played 15 of a possible 24 games in 1992 but didn't make a senior appearance in 1993.

Palfreyman was traded, along with David Bain, to Fitzroy in the 1993 AFL draft. His only league game for Fitzroy came against Richmond at Western Oval.
