= Paul Gow (footballer) =

Australian rules footballer (born 1969)

Personal information
- Full name: Paul Andrew Gow
- Born: 27 May 1969 (age 57)
- Original teams: Swan Districts, (WAFL)
- Draft: No. 8, 1990 AFL draft

Playing career^{1}
Years	Club	Games (Goals)
1991	Footscray	7 (0)
- ^{1} Playing statistics correct to the end of 1994.

Career highlights
- Swan Districts premiership side 1990

Paul Andrew Gow (born 27 May 1969) is a former Australian rules footballer who played seven games for Footscray in the Australian Football League (AFL) in 1991.

From Perth, Western Australia, Gow attended Guildford Grammar School, and was recruited from the Swan Districts Football Club in the West Australian Football League (WAFL) with the 8th selection in the 1990 AFL draft. He had been a member of Swan Districts' 1990 WAFL premiership team. At the end of the 1991 season he was traded back to Western Australia, to play for the West Coast Eagles. However he couldn't break into the powerful Eagles side, and played his only game for the club in a preseason practice match. He continued to play for Swans, playing a total of 78 games, before he left the club following a dispute in 1994. His father Peter Gow played nineteen games for Subiaco in the 1960s.
