= Jamie Grant =

Australian rules footballer

Personal information
- Full name: Jamie Grant
- Born: 23 June 1970 (age 56)
- Original teams: Daylesford, (Central Highlands)
- Draft: Footscray: No. 22, 1990 Mid-year Draft Sydney: No. 29, 1993 Mid-year Draft

Playing career^{1}
Years	Club	Games (Goals)
1991	Footscray	5 (1)
- ^{1} Playing statistics correct to the end of 1991.

Jamie Grant (born 23 June 1970) is a former Australian rules footballer who played for Footscray in the Australian Football League (AFL) in 1991. He was recruited from the Daylesford Football Club in the Central Highlands Football League with the 22nd selection in the 1990 Mid-year Draft. He was also drafted by Sydney in the 1993 Mid-year Draft, but did not play a league game for them.

He is the older brother of Western Bulldogs club legend Chris Grant.
