= Darren Davies (Australian footballer) =

Australian rules footballer

Personal information
- Full name: Darren Davies
- Born: 14 October 1965 (age 61)
- Original team: North Hobart (TFL)
- Draft: No. 7, 1987 national draft
- Height: 181 cm (5 ft 11 in)
- Weight: 80 kg (176 lb)

Playing career^{1}
Years	Club	Games (Goals)
1988–1990	Footscray	37 (35)
1991	St Kilda	2 (4)
Total		39 (39)
- ^{1} Playing statistics correct to the end of 1991.

Darren Davies (born 14 October 1965) is a former Australian rules footballer who played with Footscray and St Kilda in the Australian Football League (AFL).

Davies began his senior football career Launceston Football Club in the Northern Tasmanian Football Association (NTFA) and was a member of Launceston's beaten Grand Final side of 1984. By 1986 Davies had moved to North Hobart in the Tasmanian Football League, winning the club best and fairest in 1986 and was a member of their premiership side the following year.

After his strong performances for North Hobart, Davies was picked up by Footscray in the 1987 VFL Draft, with pick seven. He missed just one game for the club in 1988, his debut season, in which he had 343 disposals and kicked 21 goals. Most of his football was played at half forward or on a wing. He finished his career at St Kilda, after being selected by the club in the 1991 Pre-Season Draft.
