= Eddie Hocking =

Australian rules footballer

Personal information
- Full name: Eddie Hocking
- Born: 6 January 1970 (age 56)
- Original team: Central District
- Height: 162 cm (5 ft 4 in)
- Weight: 68 kg (150 lb)

Playing career^{1}
Years	Club	Games (Goals)
1991	Adelaide (AFL)	11 (4)
1987–1992	Central District (SANFL)	91 (80)
1993–1994	West Adelaide (SANFL)	? (?)
- ^{1} Playing statistics correct to the end of 1991.

Eddie Hocking (born 6 January 1970) is a former professional Australian rules footballer who played for the Adelaide Football Club in the Australian Football League (AFL).

Originally from Clare, South Australia, Hocking began training with South Australian National Football League (SANFL) club Central District aged sixteen and within 12 months made his SANFL league debut. After a strong season with Central District in 1990, when he was runner-up in the Magarey Medal, Hocking was signed by Adelaide prior to its first season in the AFL. He came off the interchange bench in Adelaide's Round One, 1991 and played ten further games that year.

An Indigenous Australian, Hocking is the shortest ever footballer to have played for Adelaide. Hocking’s trademark was his ability to baulk the player on the mark when lining up for goal. The clever onballer would make out he was going to take the set shot, and then at the last minute dodge around his opponent, who by that point was mid-air, and run into an open goal. He remained on the Adelaide Crows list for 1992 however did not play a game. Hocking finished his SANFL career with the West Adelaide Football Club.
