= John Peter-Budge =

Australian rules footballer

Personal information
- Full name: John Peter-Budge
- Born: 6 July 1968 (age 58)
- Original team: Beverley Hills
- Height: 182 cm (6 ft 0 in)
- Weight: 71 kg (157 lb)
- Position: Wing

Playing career^{1}
Years	Club	Games (Goals)
1986–88	St Kilda	45 (26)
- ^{1} Playing statistics correct to the end of 1988.

John Peter-Budge (born 6 July 1968) is a former Australian rules footballer who played with St Kilda in the Victorian Football League (VFL).

In 1983, Peter-Budge represented Victoria in the national u/16s schoolboys championship in Canberra, and was named in the All-Australian Schoolboy side.
