= Jason Millar =

Australian rules footballer

Personal information
- Full name: Jason Millar
- Born: 30 August 1970 (age 56)
- Original team: Caloundra
- Height: 197 cm (6 ft 6 in)
- Weight: 101 kg (223 lb)

Playing career^{1}
Years	Club	Games (Goals)
1991	Brisbane Bears	1 (0)
- ^{1} Playing statistics correct to the end of 1991.

Jason Millar (born 30 August 1970) is a former Australian rules footballer who played with the Brisbane Bears in the Australian Football League (AFL).

Millar, from Queensland Australian Football League (QAFL) club Caloundra, was the only Sunshine Coast product to play for the Bears.

A ruckman, he came to Brisbane as a zone selection and played his first game against North Melbourne at Brisbane's home ground Carrara Oval, finishing with eight disposals and six hit-outs.

He shared his debut with three other Bears players, Richard Champion, Troy Clarke and David Ogg.

Unlike the other three players, Millar wouldn't play another league game, with an injury sustained off the field ending his AFL career.
