= Neil Gaghan =

Australian rules footballer

Personal information
- Full name: Neil Gaghan
- Born: 24 March 1963 (age 63)
- Original team: Moomba Park
- Height: 183 cm (6 ft 0 in)
- Weight: 79 kg (174 lb)

Playing career^{1}
Years	Club	Games (Goals)
1985	Carlton	3 (0)
1987	Brisbane Bears	3 (0)
Total		6 (0)
- ^{1} Playing statistics correct to the end of 1987.

Neil Gaghan (born 24 March 1963) is a former Australian rules footballer who played with Carlton and the Brisbane Bears in the Victorian Football League (VFL).

Gaghan, who had 23 disposals against Collingwood on his league debut, was formerly a Carlton Under-19s player. With Carlton playing finals football in 1985 and 1986, Gaghan was unable to establish himself in the seniors. He spent the entire 1986 season with the Carlton reserves and participated in their premiership team.

Released by Carlton, Gaghan was signed up by Brisbane for their first VFL season in 1987. After managing just three appearances for the Bears, Gaghan was delisted but would remain in Queensland with Kedron Grange.
