= Peter Whyte =

Australian rules footballer

Personal information
- Born: 25 February 1969 (age 57)
- Original team: Barwon
- Height: 185 cm (6 ft 1 in)
- Weight: 89 kg (196 lb)

Playing career^{1}
Years	Club	Games (Goals)
1986–1988	Geelong	22 (3)
- ^{1} Playing statistics correct to the end of 1988.

Peter Whyte (born 25 February 1969) is a former Australian rules footballer who played with Geelong in the Victorian Football League (VFL).

Whyte, a utility from Barwon, was an All-Australian at Teal Cup level for Victoria. He was aged just 17 when he made six appearances for Geelong in the 1986 VFL season, the first in round 14. In 1987 he played 14 games, then was troubled by injury in 1988 and played just twice in the seniors.

After leaving Geelong, Whyte played for South Barwon and Werribee.
