= Dean Harding =

Australian rules footballer

Personal information
- Full name: Dean Harding
- Born: 10 October 1971 (age 55); Wangaratta
- Original team: Wangaratta Rovers
- Draft: 1. 78, 1990 National Draft
- Height: 176 cm (5 ft 9 in)
- Weight: 73 kg (161 lb)
- Position: Forward

Playing career^{1}
Years	Club	Games (Goals)
1991–1993	Fitzroy	19 (25)
- ^{1} Playing statistics correct to the end of 1993.

Dean Harding (born 10 October 1971) is a former Australian rules footballer who played with Fitzroy in the Australian Football League (AFL).

Harding was selected by Fitzroy, from the Wangaratta Rovers, with the 78th overall pick of the 1990 National Draft. He played 12 games for Fitzroy in the 1991 AFL season. His 16 goals that year included four in his club's upset win over the top of the table West Coast Eagles at Princes Park in the final round of the home and away season. He made just two appearances in 1992 and five in 1993.
