= James Cook (Australian footballer) =

Australian rules footballer (born 1974)

Personal information
- Full name: James Cook
- Born: 7 January 1974 (age 52)
- Original team: North Hobart (TFL Statewide)
- Draft: 2nd overall, 1990 AFL draft Carlton
- Height: 190 cm (6 ft 3 in)
- Weight: 95 kg (209 lb)
- Position: Forward

Playing career^{1}
Years	Club	Games (Goals)
1994–95	Carlton	25 (35)
1996–99	Western Bulldogs	49 (96)
2000	Melbourne	3 (8)
Total		77 (139)
- ^{1} Playing statistics correct to the end of 2000.

Career highlights
- AFL Rising Star nominee: 1994

James Cook (born 7 January 1974) is a former Australian rules footballer who played for Carlton, the Western Bulldogs and Melbourne in the Australian Football League (AFL). Attended St Virgils College in Hobart.

== Carlton ==
Cook played at North Hobart while still a teenager and was recruited by Carlton with the second pick of the 1990 AFL draft, which they had gained by trading Warren McKenzie to Sydney. It was Carlton's earliest ever draft pick up until Marc Murphy in 2005.

He had to wait three seasons to make his debut and in just his fourth league game kicked six goals in a win over Sydney at Optus Oval to earn an AFL Rising Star nomination, and better the five goals which he booted against Hawthorn two weeks earlier. His performances for the rest of the season were poor but he was picked in both the Qualifying Final and Semi Finals, where he kicked three and two goals respectively. He made just seven appearances in 1995, a premiership year for Carlton, but was not able to establish a place in the strong forward-line come the finals. At the end of the year, Cook was traded to Footscray in exchange for Ben Sexton.

== Western Bulldogs ==
After struggling in his first year at Footscray, Cook played the best football of his career in 1997, with the club re-branded as the Western Bulldogs. He kicked 36 goals for the season, including 17 in the final three games as the Bulldogs fell just short of making a Grand Final, to finish third in their goal-kicking behind Simon Minton-Connell and Chris Grant. His run started in round 22 when he kicked seven goals and three behinds against Hawthorn. He then kicked a game-high four goals to help his club defeat Sydney in the Qualifying Final, outperforming Swans forward Tony Lockett. Cook then kicked six goals in the Preliminary Final against Adelaide. He could have had one more but an apple thrown from the crowd disrupted his kick as he went for his seventh goal. This would prove to be costly as the Crows fought back to win by two points, ending the Bulldogs' season.

In 1998, Cook kicked 23 goals from 11 appearances and in 1999 finished with 32 from 19 games. On five occasions during this time he kicked five goals or more but also played many games where he saw little of the ball and he was offloaded to Melbourne in the 1999 pre-season draft.

== Melbourne ==
At Melbourne, Cook played only three matches but won a game against the Kangaroos when he kicked six goals before an ankle injury forced his retirement.
