= Dean Greig =

Australian rules footballer

Personal information
- Born: 31 October 1968 (age 58)
- Original team: Hawthorn U19s
- Draft: No. 43, 1991 Pre-Season draft
- Debut: Round 21, 10 August 1991, St Kilda vs. Carlton, at Waverley Park
- Height: 185 cm (6 ft 1 in)
- Weight: 96 kg (212 lb)

Playing career^{1}
Years	Club	Games (Goals)
1991–1994	St Kilda	33 (8)
- ^{1} Playing statistics correct to the end of 1994.

Dean Greig (born 31 October 1968) is a former Australian rules footballer in the Australian Football League.

Greig played under 19s football for Hawthorn in the Victorian Football League (VFL) during the 1980s, captaining the team and winning its best and fairest award in 1985; despite this, Hawthorn did not wish to retain him, and it released him at the end of 1985. He trialled a pre-season at Collingwood, but was also not recruited to its senior list.

In 1990, Greig played for the ailing Camberwell Football Club in the Victorian Football Association. He polled ten J. J. Liston Trophy votes in only nine games, and Camberwell coach Gary Brice described Grieg's performances as the sole shining light in a winless season which turned out to be the club's last in the VFA.

Greig was subsequently recruited to the Australian Football League (to which the VFL had changed its name in 1990) by the St Kilda Football Club in 1991. On debut in Round 21, 1991, at nearly 23 years of age, he compiled a league record 39 disposals (23 kicks, 16 handballs) against Carlton, the VFL/AFL record for most ever disposals on debut.

A strongly built midfielder, he didn't progress as expected, nevertheless managed some fine games with the St Kilda and was noted for his creative handball.

In August 2001, whilst playing for Scoresby Football Club in the Eastern Football League (Australia), he suffered a broken tibia and fibula and due to the onset of compartment syndrome and infection, had his lower leg amputated.
