= Darren Tarczon =

Australian rules footballer

Personal information
- Full name: Darren Tarczon
- Born: 28 February 1971 (age 55)
- Original team: North Melbourne U19s/Port Melbourne
- Draft: 26th overall, 1990 preseason draft 13th overall, 1991 Pre-Season Draft; 94th overall, 1993 Pre-Season Draft
- Height: 183 cm (6 ft 0 in)
- Weight: 91 kg (201 lb)
- Position: Utility

Playing career^{1}
Years	Club	Games (Goals)
1991–1992	Carlton	11 (5)
- ^{1} Playing statistics correct to the end of 1992.

Darren Tarczon (born 28 February 1971) is a former Australian rules footballer who played with Carlton in the Australian Football League (AFL).
