= Peter Smith (Australian footballer, born 1960) =

Australian rules footballer

Personal information
- Full name: Peter J. Smith
- Born: 26 January 1960 (age 66)
- Original team: Glenroy/Jacana
- Height: 185 cm (6 ft 1 in)
- Weight: 85 kg (187 lb)

Playing career^{1}
Years	Club	Games (Goals)
1981–1986	North Melbourne	36 (1)
1987	Brisbane Bears	4 (1)
Total		40 (2)
- ^{1} Playing statistics correct to the end of 1987.

Peter J. Smith (born 26 January 1960) is a former Australian rules footballer who played with North Melbourne and the Brisbane Bears in the Victorian Football League (VFL) during the 1980s.

Smith played 11 games in the 1983 VFL season, which was the most times he would appear in a season for North Melbourne. The tally included North Melbourne's finals campaign, with Smith playing a semi final and preliminary final.

He was still a fringe player when he left the club at the end of the 1986 season to join the league's newest club, Brisbane, with whom he would make four appearances.
