= Mark Trewella =

Australian rules footballer

Personal information
- Full name: Mark Trewella
- Born: 28 June 1966 (age 60)
- Original team: Doncaster
- Height: 186 cm (6 ft 1 in)
- Weight: 84 kg (185 lb)

Playing career^{1}
Years	Club	Games (Goals)
1987–1990	Fitzroy	23 (4)
1991	Richmond	4 (4)
Total		27 (8)
- ^{1} Playing statistics correct to the end of 1991.

Mark Trewella (born 28 June 1966) is a former Australian rules footballer who played with Fitzroy and Richmond in the Victorian/Australian Football League (VFL/AFL).

Trewella, who was from Doncaster originally, started out at Fitzroy in the Under 19s. He won three reserves best and fairest awards for Fitzroy and was a member of their reserves premiership team in 1989. After playing 23 senior games for Fitzroy, Trewella made his way to Richmond, via the 1991 Pre-Season Draft. He made four appearances for Richmond, all in the 1991 AFL season. He later played in the Victorian Football Association for both Prahran and Box Hill.
