= Brad Davis (Australian rules footballer) =

Australian rules footballer

Personal information
- Full name: Bradley James Davis
- Born: 18 July 1972 (age 54)
- Original team: Burnie Hawks
- Draft: No. 27, 1990 National Draft
- Height: 195 cm (6 ft 5 in)
- Weight: 90 kg (198 lb)

Playing career^{1}
Years	Club	Games (Goals)
1991–1993	Fitzroy	5 (1)
- ^{1} Playing statistics correct to the end of 1993.

Bradley James Davis (born 18 July 1972) is a former Australian rules footballer who played with Fitzroy in the Australian Football League (AFL).

A ruckman, Davis started his career at the Burnie Hawks, from where he was drafted by Fitzroy. They selected him in the 1990 National Draft, with pick 27. He played four games for Fitzroy in 1991, but played just once more, in the opening round of the 1993 season.

In 1994 he joined West Adelaide for a stint in the South Australian National Football League, then he returned to Tasmania and signed with the Burnie Dockers. He won Burnie's best and fairest award in 1998 and 1999. In 2001 he played with the Tasmanian Devils and for the following two years played at North Ringwood. He then rejoined the Dockers and won the Wilfred Barker Medal for his efforts in the 2005 Northern Tasmanian Football League grand final. In 2006 he acted as Burnie's playing coach.
