= Scott Crow =

Australian rules footballer

Personal information
- Full name: Scott Crow
- Born: 18 December 1973 (age 52)
- Original team: Port Fairy (HFL)
- Draft: 44th, 1990 AFL draft
- Height: 179 cm (5 ft 10 in)
- Weight: 80 kg (176 lb)

Playing career^{1}
Years	Club	Games (Goals)
1993–1995	Hawthorn	13 (2)
1996–1999	Collingwood	62 (35)
Total		75 (37)
- ^{1} Playing statistics correct to the end of 1999.

Scott Crow (born 18 December 1973) is a former Australian rules footballer who played with Hawthorn and Collingwood in the Australian Football League (AFL).

An on-baller from Hampden Football League club Port Fairy, Crow was the 44th pick of the 1990 AFL draft. He had to wait until the 1993 AFL season to make his senior debut for Hawthorn and he was never a regular fixture in the team.

After his three seasons at Hawthorn, Crow was traded to Collingwood, along with Alex McDonald, for the 54th selection in the 1995 AFL draft.

Crow appeared in all 22 rounds of the 1996 AFL season, averaging 20 disposals a game. He also took 113 marks, the most by a Collingwood player that year. By 1999 he was only able to make it into the side for five games and was delisted.
