= Craig Somerville =

Australian rules footballer

Personal information
- Full name: Craig Somerville
- Born: 24 September 1968 (age 58)
- Original team: Lucknow
- Height: 178 cm (5 ft 10 in)
- Weight: 80 kg (176 lb)

Playing career^{1}
Years	Club	Games (Goals)
1986	Footscray	8 (7)
- ^{1} Playing statistics correct to the end of 1986.

Craig Somerville (born 24 September 1968) is a former Australian rules footballer who played with Footscray in the Victorian Football League (VFL).
