= Ian Kidgell =

Australian rules footballer

Personal information
- Born: 21 November 1970 (age 56)
- Original teams: Haileybury College/ Hawthorn
- Height: 203 cm (6 ft 8 in)
- Weight: 106 kg (234 lb)
- Position: Ruckman/forward

Playing career^{1}
Years	Club	Games (Goals)
1991	Brisbane Bears	
- ^{1} Playing statistics correct to the end of 1991.

Ian Kidgell (born 21 November 1970) is a former Australian rules footballer who played with the Brisbane Bears in the Australian Football League (AFL).

Kidgell was originally listed by Hawthorn and played for their Under 19s and Reserves in 1989 and 1990 before leaving Hawthorn to go to Brisbane in the 1991 Pre-season Draft.

Kidgell played three senior games for Brisbane in 1991 before returning to Hawthorn in 1992, before moving to Essendon for the 1993 AFL season, and then to Victorian Football Association (VFA) club Oakleigh in 1994, and then to Yarra Ranges Football & Netball League club Monbulk in 1995, playing in their 1997 and 1998 premiership teams.

A champion high jumper as a junior, and standing 203 cm, he was the Bears' tallest ever player and had athleticism, Kidgell had to wait until round 21 to make his debut.
