= Dean Strauch =

Australian rules footballer

Personal information
- Full name: Dean Strauch
- Born: 4 June 1966 (age 60)
- Original team: Golden Square
- Height: 179 cm (5 ft 10 in)
- Weight: 77 kg (170 lb)
- Position: Midfielder

Playing career^{1}
Years	Club	Games (Goals)
1986–1989	Carlton	5 (0)
- ^{1} Playing statistics correct to the end of 1989.

Dean Strauch (born 4 June 1966) is a former Australian rules footballer who played with Carlton in the Victorian Football League (VFL).
