= Shane Strempel =

Australian rules footballer

Personal information
- Full name: Shane Strempel
- Born: 21 January 1969 (age 57)
- Original team: Swan Districts
- Draft: 4th overall, 1990 Pre-draft; Brisbane
- Height: 196 cm (6 ft 5 in)
- Weight: 91 kg (201 lb)

Playing career^{1}
Years	Club	Games (Goals)
1991	Brisbane Bears	3 (2)
- ^{1} Playing statistics correct to the end of 1991.

Shane Strempel (born 21 January 1969) is a former Australian rules footballer who played for the Brisbane Bears in the Australian Football League (AFL).

== Career ==
Brisbane picked Strempel up from WAFL club Swan Districts with pick four in the 1990 Pre-Season draft. Along with team-mate Peter Worsfold, Strempel made his debut in Brisbane's round five loss to Collingwood at Victoria Park and had 10 disposals. He retained his place in the side the following week when the Bears took on Essendon and although they couldn't get a win for Michael McLean in his 100th appearance, Strempel contributed two goals and had nine disposals. Not selected in round seven, he returned to the team the following round when Brisbane lost to St Kilda at the Gabba, with Strempel having 12 disposals, five hit-outs and kicking two behinds. It would be his last appearance for Brisbane and at the end of the year he was traded to Essendon. The move didn't work out and Strempel returned to Swan Districts, where he played until 1994.

== Controversy ==
In 2001, it was revealed in an AFL Players Association video, produced by former Bears player Rob Dickson, that then coach Robert Walls had overseen a training session in 1991 which had left Strempel bloodied, bruised and with chipped teeth. Walls had intended to teach the Swans Districts recruit to respect his team-mates and got eight of his players to put the boxing gloves and make a circle around Strempel, who would take turns boxing each player. The session only ended when one of the last men in line, Brad Hardie, told Walls "we'd better stop or we'll kill him".
