= David Robertson (Australian footballer) =

Australian rules footballer

Personal information
- Full name: David Robertson
- Born: 15 August 1962 (age 64)
- Original team: North Adelaide (SANFL)
- Draft: No. 21, 1986 national draft
- Height: 178 cm (5 ft 10 in)
- Weight: 78 kg (172 lb)

Playing career^{1}
Years	Club	Games (Goals)
1988–1989	Collingwood	17 (9)
1991	Essendon	3 (1)
Total		20 (10)
- ^{1} Playing statistics correct to the end of 1991.

David Robertson (born 15 August 1962) is a former Australian rules footballer who played with Collingwood and Essendon in the Victorian/Australian Football League (VFL/AFL).

Robertson won the "Best and Fairest" award for the North Adelaide Under 19s in 1981 and would go on and play 71 senior games for the SANFL club as well as make one appearance for South Australia. He participated in North Adelaide's 1985 and 1986 SANFL Grand Final losses to Glenelg. In 1987 North Adelaide made a third successive grand final and this time won, however Robertson missed out as had chosen to sit out the last year of his contract. This was because the club hadn't granted him a clearance to Collingwood, who had picked him up in the 1986 VFL draft.

His two seasons at Collingwood brought him 17 games and he played a final each year. He joined North-Eastern Victorian club Euroa in 1990 but returned to Melbourne when Essendon selected him in the mid-season draft. Although not used by Essendon that year, he played three senior games in 1991.
