= Simon Luhrs =

Australian rules footballer

Personal information
- Full name: Simon Luhrs
- Born: 18 June 1970 (age 56)
- Original team: Western Districts
- Height: 195 cm (6 ft 5 in)
- Weight: 91 kg (201 lb)

Playing career^{1}
Years	Club	Games (Goals)
1991–1992	Brisbane Bears	12 (0)
- ^{1} Playing statistics correct to the end of 1992.

Career highlights
- Brisbane Bears reserves premiership 1991

Simon Luhrs (born 18 June 1970) is a former Australian rules footballer who played with the Brisbane Bears in the Australian Football League (AFL).

Luhrs, a zone selection in the 1989 VFL Draft, was a member of the Queensland team which defeated Victoria in 1991. Towards the end of the 1991 AFL season he broke into the seniors for the first time and was also a full-back in the reserves premiership team. While primarily a key defender, Luhrs was also used as a ruckman on occasions.

After leaving Brisbane he began playing for Central District in the SANFL. He got his second chance to play AFL football when he was picked up by Hawthorn in the 1994 mid-season draft. Luhrs, however, did not play a senior game for Hawthorn and finished his career at Central District.
