= Andrew Underwood =

Australian rules footballer

Personal information
- Born: 14 July 1967 (age 59)
- Original team: Sturt
- Draft: No. 61, 1986 national draft
- Debut: Round 1, 1989, Essendon vs. West Coast Eagles, at the WACA
- Height: 185 cm (6 ft 1 in)
- Weight: 88 kg (194 lb)
- Position: Utility

Playing career^{1}
Years	Club	Games (Goals)
1989–1990	Essendon	12 (4)
1991	Richmond	12 (4)
Total		24 (8)
- ^{1} Playing statistics correct to the end of 1991.

Andrew Underwood is a former Australian rules footballer who played for Essendon and Richmond in the Victorian Football League (VFL). He made his debut with Essendon against the West Coast Eagles in round 1 of the 1989 VFL season, kicking a goal on debut. Underwood played 12 games at Essendon over two seasons and joined Richmond in 1991, playing another 12 matches.
