= Cory Young =

Australian rules footballer

Personal information
- Full name: Cory Peter John Young
- Born: 6 March 1971 (age 55); Melbourne
- Original team: Oakleigh
- Height: 177 cm (5 ft 10 in)
- Weight: 75 kg (165 lb)
- Position: Mid

Playing career^{1}
Years	Club	Games (Goals)
1989–90	Richmond	6 (1)
1991	West Coast	1 (1)
Total		7 (2)
- ^{1} Playing statistics correct to the end of 1991.

Cory Young (born 6 March 1971) is a former Australian rules footballer who played for Richmond and West Coast in the Victorian/Australian Football League (VFL/AFL).

In two seasons at Richmond, Young only managed six games and spent the rest of his time in the reserves. He was drafted by West Coast in 1991 but again struggled to break into the seniors due to injuries. He made just one appearance, a win over Essendon at Windy Hill mid-season, contributing three disposals and a goal. He disagreed with coach Mick Malthouse's feedback after that game, and was never seen again at the top level.

After leaving the AFL he played in the Victorian Football Association. He was captain of the Oakleigh Football Club in 1994 and won the J. J. Liston Trophy that season, the club's final season before becoming a feeder club for Springvale. He also played briefly with Frankston.
