= Sean Simpson (footballer) =

Australian rules footballer

Personal information
- Full name: Sean Simpson
- Born: 16 April 1970 (age 56)
- Original team: East Ballarat
- Height: 188 cm (6 ft 2 in)
- Weight: 85 kg (187 lb)
- Position: Wingman/Tagger

Playing career^{1}
Years	Club	Games (Goals)
1988–1990	St Kilda	7 (1)
1991–1998	Geelong	114 (18)
Total		121 (19)
- ^{1} Playing statistics correct to the end of 1998.

Sean Simpson (born 16 April 1970) is a former Australian rules footballer who played for St Kilda and Geelong in the Australian Football League (AFL).

Simpson started his career at St Kilda, after being recruited from East Ballarat, but had to wait until his third season to play in a win. After being delisted he was picked up by a much stronger side in Geelong and went on to appear in 10 finals with the club, including the 1992 AFL Grand Final loss. In his first year at Geelong he gained two 'Best on Ground's at the Brownlow Medal count. He played mostly on the wing or as a tagger.

Simpson's son Sam was drafted to Geelong under the father–son rule with the fifty third pick in the 2017 rookie draft.
