= Kevin Dyson (Australian footballer) =

Australian rules footballer (born 1967)

Personal information
- Full name: Kevin Dyson
- Born: 4 May 1967 (age 59)
- Original team: Oakleigh
- Height: 180 cm (5 ft 11 in)
- Weight: 93 kg (205 lb)
- Position: Centreman

Playing career^{1}
Years	Club	Games (Goals)
1991 – 1995	Melbourne	70 (25)
1996 – 1997	Sydney Swans	35 (3)
Total		105 (28)
- ^{1} Playing statistics correct to the end of 1997.

Kevin Dyson (born 4 May 1967) is a former Australian rules footballer who played for Melbourne and the Sydney Swans in the Australian Football League (AFL) during the 1990s.

Dyson, recruited to Melbourne from Oakleigh, was a consistent performer in his debut AFL season. Playing mostly as a centreman, he appeared in five finals matches while at Melbourne and made his first and only Grand Final when he crossed to Sydney in 1996.

He retired after the 1997 season, due to his job with an electronics and computer company required him to often travel and preventing him from being able to train full-time. He remained in Sydney after retiring from playing, and has recently been involved in setting up a football academy for the Swans.
