= Matthew Ryan (Australian rules footballer) =

Australian rules footballer

Personal information
- Full name: Matthew Ryan
- Born: 2 June 1967 (age 59)
- Original team: Eltham (DVFL)
- Height: 175 cm (5 ft 9 in)
- Weight: 73 kg (161 lb)
- Position: Rover

Playing career^{1}
Years	Club	Games (Goals)
1985–1989	Collingwood	45 (44)
1990	Sydney Swans	10 (8)
1991–1992	Brisbane Bears	18 (8)
Total		73 (60)
- ^{1} Playing statistics correct to the end of 1992.

Matthew Ryan (born 2 June 1967) is a former Australian rules footballer who played with Collingwood, the Sydney Swans and the Brisbane Bears in the Victorian/Australian Football League (AFL).

Ryan, who was originally from Eltham, played just five games in his first two seasons but then had his best year in 1987. A rover, he amassed a club high 478 disposals, at just under 24 a game and was Collingwood's second best goal-kicker behind Brian Taylor with 28 goals. He also finished runner-up in the Copeland Trophy and was his club's best performer at the Brownlow Medal, securing nine votes. The following season he was again a regular fixture in the team, playing 18 games, including a semi final.

Collingwood traded Ryan to the Sydney Swans at the end of the 1989 season, in return for draft picks 22 and 82, which were used on Mathew Hanrahan and Troy Lehmann. His Sydney debut in 1990 was against his former club and he performed well with 25 disposals and three goals. After just one year in Sydney he again changed clubs, this time to the Brisbane Bears through the pre-season draft. He also averaged 21 disposals a game in 1991 but struggled to hold a place in the side the next year.
