= Stephen Anderson (Australian footballer) =

Australian rules footballer

Personal information
- Full name: Stephen Anderson
- Born: 17 January 1968 (age 58)
- Original team: South Warrnambool
- Draft: 26th, 1990 Midyear Draft
- Height: 170 cm (5 ft 7 in)
- Weight: 70 kg (154 lb)

Playing career^{1}
Years	Club	Games (Goals)
1987	Central District (SANFL)	17 (36)
1991	Collingwood (VFL)	4 (2)
- ^{1} Playing statistics correct to the end of 1991.

Stephen Anderson (born 17 January 1968) is a former Australian rules footballer who played with Collingwood in the Australian Football League (AFL) and Central District on the South Australian Football League (SANFL).

Anderson was recruited by Collingwood from South Warrnambool in the Midyear Draft, during their premiership winning 1990 AFL season. He did not feature in any senior games for Collingwood that year but made four appearances in 1991. On his AFL debut, against Fitzroy at Victoria Park, Anderson had 24 disposals and a goal.

He won the 1991 Gardiner Medal, for his reserves performances.
