= Justin Clarkson =

Australian rules footballer

Personal information
- Full name: Justin Clarkson
- Born: 5 October 1968 (age 58)
- Original team: Melbourne U-19s / Ormond
- Height: 180 cm (5 ft 11 in)
- Weight: 75 kg (165 lb)

Playing career^{1}
Years	Club	Games (Goals)
1991	Sydney Swans	3 (0)
- ^{1} Playing statistics correct to the end of 1991.

Justin Clarkson (born 5 October 1968) is a former Australian rules footballer who played with the Sydney Swans in the Australian Football League (AFL).

Clarkson played under-19s football for Melbourne.

He made three appearances for Sydney in 1991, against Footscray, Essendon and St Kilda.

Clarkson was later drafted by Carlton, from Ormond Amateurs, but only played in the reserves.
