= Jason McCartney (footballer) =

Australian rules footballer

Personal information
- Born: 14 March 1974 (age 52); Nhill, Victoria
- Original teams: Nhill, (WFL)

Playing career^{1}
Years	Club	Games (Goals)
1991–1994	Collingwood	38 (28)
1995–1997	Adelaide	37 (20)
1998–2003	North Melbourne	107 (15)
Total		182 (63)
- ^{1} Playing statistics correct to the end of 2003.

Jason McCartney OAM (born 14 March 1974) is a former Australian rules footballer, 2002 Bali bombing survivor, former coach of the AIS/AFL Academy, and former list manager at the Western Bulldogs. McCartney is currently the GM/ Head of Football at the Greater Western Sydney Giants.

== AFL career ==
McCartney began his career at the Collingwood Football Club amid a huge reputation from his junior football days. He could play at either end of the ground as a key-position forward or backman. After McCartney left the Magpies after four seasons from 1991 to 1994, he switched to Adelaide, with whom he had a good debut season in 1995. He missed out most of the year due to the strength of the team in 1997, therefore missing the Crows' first premiership triumph. With this in mind, he moved to North Melbourne, where he played in the losing 1998 Grand Final against the Crows. In 1999, he once again had an opportunity to play in a Grand Final, but he was suspended during the preliminary final against Brisbane, saying that it was the worst day of his life, and went on to miss the Roos' premiership triumph that year. He then played in the team that made a losing preliminary final in 2000, which was the last finals match he played, and could have been considered unlucky, considering the circumstances, to have never played in a premiership. In 2002, he had a poor season after being forced to fill the key-forward role vacated by champion Wayne Carey, who did not compete in the 2002 season, having left the club following a sex scandal with Anthony Stevens' wife.

== Bali bombings ==
On 12 October 2002, McCartney was a victim of the Bali bombing near the Sari Club. He was drinking at a nearby pub called Paddy's Bar when the bomb exploded, causing McCartney and his companion, fellow AFL teammate Mick Martyn, to suffer the impact of the blast. Martyn escaped with minor burns, while McCartney suffered severe second-degree burns to over 50% of his body.

McCartney initially thought his burns were minor and set about saving those around him instead of worrying about himself. He considered others to be in more pain than he was, and had to be taken on a special chartered flight back to Melbourne along with other victims. When he arrived, the injuries turned out to be severe, and McCartney almost died during surgery. He was awarded a Medal of the Order of Australia for his support to other victims.

What followed was a long rehabilitation process. McCartney stated that his objectives were to marry his fiancée Nerissa, as planned, and also to return to AFL football. The comeback was seen as an almost impossible task.

== Return to AFL football ==
He married fiancée Nerissa Vanderheyden on 14 December, just 63 days after the bombings. Throughout 2003, McCartney rehabilitated with the intention of regaining his place in the Kangaroos on merit. Following an early season thigh strain, McCartney eventually played seven games with the Kangaroos' then-VFL affiliate Port Melbourne before gaining senior selection.

But what a moment this is, for not only Australia, not only for AFL football, but for the free world as well. Now, I'm not trying to overdramatize things...this shows terrorism, as I said, will never beat courage. Welcome back indeed, Jason McCartney, an inspiration to all.

— Commentator and Collingwood president Eddie McGuire on Nine Network's television call of McCartney's return after the bombings (North Melbourne vs. Richmond, Round 11, 2003)

On 6 June 2003, McCartney returned to the AFL. Playing for the Kangaroos against Richmond, McCartney was heavily bandaged, wore a long-sleeved top and had to wear protective gloves. McCartney wore the numbers "88" and "202" on his guernsey—88 representing the number of Australians who died in the Bali bombing, and 202 the total number of deaths—with many in the crowd also holding up the numbers on signs. Other Australian victims were honored in a video shown on the stadium's video screens before the game, and representatives from five Australian Rules football clubs who lost players in the attacks were presented to the crowd. Melbourne players Steven Febey and Steven Armstrong, who suffered shrapnel injuries in the blast, also attended the match.

In the comeback game, McCartney had the modest statistics of 3 kicks, 1 mark, 1 goal, and 1 behind; however, these stats belied the impact he had on the game. McCartney came on as a substitute at full-forward to cheers from both sets of supporters; and, early in the fourth quarter, he took a mark inside the forward 50-metre line and kicked a goal from the resulting set shot to put the Kangaroos ahead by nine points. With two minutes remaining, and the Tigers subsequently having retaken the lead by three points, he also collected a bouncing pass inside the forward 50 and toepoked the ball through to Leigh Harding, who finished the goal from close range to put the Kangaroos ahead again for good. North Melbourne eventually won with a score of 13.14 (92) to Richmond's 13.11 (89).

In a twist to the night, McCartney announced his retirement from AFL football during his on-field post-match interview, citing that his road back had left him physically exhausted and that he preferred to leave on a high note. To this day, it is considered one of the most inspirational sports-related stories in Australia, with Fox Footy's AFL: The Greatest ranking it as #7 on its list of the biggest AFL news stories of all time.

The image of McCartney being chaired off the ground after the game is captured in Jamie Cooper's painting the Game That Made Australia, commissioned by the AFL in 2008 to celebrate the 150th anniversary of the sport.

In 2020, in an official YouTube video, the AFL ranked McCartney's comeback as the most memorable AFL moment at Docklands Stadium in its 20-year history, ahead of the likes of Hawthorn's Lance Franklin completing his 2008 100-goal season against Carlton, and Essendon's James Hird's famous final-quarter heroics against the West Coast Eagles in 2004.

== Post-retirement ==
As of 2003, the Jason McCartney Medal has been awarded to the player judged most courageous on field in games between Collingwood and North Melbourne.

Following his retirement, McCartney wrote After Bali, which recounted his ordeal. He is also a prominent motivational speaker on the public-speaking circuit around Australia. He was an assistant coach at the Calder Cannons in the TAC Cup in 2009 and joined Fremantle as a development coach for the 2011 season.

He then moved back to Melbourne to be the Western Bulldogs' list manager at the end of 2011, where his stay included their 2016 premiership win. He left this role after the 2017 season and moved to Sydney to be the GWS Giants GM/ Head of Football.

In September 2024, McCartney was responsible for GWS receiving a $20,000 fine for intentionally coming into contact with Swans player Tom Papley during the First Qualifying Final of the AFL finals series. This occurred shortly after an onfield stoush between both sides triggered by wrestling between Papley and Giants' captain Toby Greene at the end of the second quarter. It was the second time McCartney was fined for inappropriate behaviour during a match, having been sanctioned a further $20,000 in 2021 for abusing an umpire.
