= Stephen Hooper =

Australian rules footballer

Personal information
- Born: 9 May 1969 (age 57)
- Original team: East Perth (WAFL)
- Debut: Round 2, 1991, Geelong vs. St Kilda
- Height: 198 cm (6 ft 6 in)
- Weight: 98 kg (216 lb)

Playing career^{1}
Years	Club	Games (Goals)
1991–1993	Geelong	21 (0)
- ^{1} Playing statistics correct to the end of 1993.

Stephen Hooper (born 9 May 1969) is a former Australian rules footballer who played 21 games for the Geelong in the Australian Football League. He was the number one draft pick of the 1990 AFL draft. He made his debut on round 2 of the 1991 AFL season and played a total of 21 games in the 1991 and 1993 seasons.
