= Todd Menegola =

Australian rules footballer

Personal information
- Full name: Todd Clement Menegola
- Born: 25 December 1967 (age 58); Bruce Rock, WA
- Original team: Swan Districts
- Draft: No. 16, 1990 National Draft
- Height: 185 cm (6 ft 1 in)
- Weight: 83 kg (183 lb)
- Position: CEO of Small Scale Business

Playing career^{1}
Years	Club	Games (Goals)
1991–1993	Richmond	19 (13)
1995	Fremantle	0 (0)
- ^{1} Playing statistics correct to the end of 1995.

Todd Clement Menegola (born 25 December 1967) is a former Australian rules footballer who played with Richmond in the Australian Football League (AFL).

Menegola started his career at Swan Districts in 1989 and was from Mukinbudin originally. He was a member of the Swan Districts WAFL premiership winning team in 1990.

Richmond acquired his services via the 1990 National Draft, at pick 16. He played in the AFL for three seasons, then returned to Swan Districts.

He was on Fremantle's list in 1995 but didn't play a senior AFL game with the club. Related to former Geelong AFL player, Sam Menegola.
