= Scott Turner (footballer) =

Australian rules footballer

Personal information
- Born: 31 May 1970 (age 56)
- Original team: Ararat/Melbourne Reserves
- Debut: Round 1, 23 March 1991, Richmond vs. St Kilda, at Waverley Park
- Height: 196 cm (6 ft 5 in)
- Weight: 96 kg (212 lb)

Playing career^{1}
Years	Club	Games (Goals)
1991–1999	Richmond	144 (33)
- ^{1} Playing statistics correct to the end of 1999.

Scott Turner (born 31 May 1970) is a former Australian rules football player who played in the AFL between 1991 and 1999 for the Richmond Football Club.

Turner coached Hampden Football League club Warrnambool to premierships in 2000 and 2001. From 2008 to 2010, then again in 2012, Turner was coach of Ararat, his original club.
