= Mark Arceri =

Italian-Australian rules footballer (born 1964)

Personal information
- Born: 25 October 1964 (age 62)
- Original team: Williamstown (VFA)
- Height: 170 cm (5 ft 7 in)
- Weight: 70 kg (154 lb)

Playing career^{1}
Years	Club	Games (Goals)
1984–1990	North Melbourne	70 (102)
1991–1992	Carlton	17 (26)
1993	St Kilda	5 (5)
Total		92 (133)
- ^{1} Playing statistics correct to the end of 1993.

Mark Arceri (born 25 October 1964) is a former Australian rules footballer who played with North Melbourne, Carlton and St Kilda in the Australian Football League (AFL).

A rover of Italian heritage, he made the final shortlist of 50 for the VFL/AFL Italian Team of the Century. He is dubiously remembered as the player who, with 33 seconds remaining, kicked Carlton's only goal in its round 11, 1991 loss to Footscray at the Western Oval.
