= Corey Bell =

Australian rules footballer

Personal information
- Full name: Corey Bell
- Born: 24 January 1973 (age 53); Glen Waverly
- Original team: Southport (QAFL)
- Height: 170 cm (5 ft 7 in)
- Weight: 62 kg (137 lb)
- Position: Rover

Playing career^{1}
Years	Club	Games (Goals)
1991	Brisbane Bears	8 (2)
- ^{1} Playing statistics correct to the end of 1991.

Corey Bell (born 24 January 1973) is a former Australian rules footballer who played with the Brisbane Bears in the Australian Football League (AFL).

One of the smallest footballers to play in the AFL, Bell was a rover for Southport when he was recruited to the Brisbane Bears in the summer of 1991 before then debuting midway through the 1991 season. Bell had 16 disposals on debut, against Richmond at Carrara and appeared in a total of 8 games for the Bears over the 1991 - 193 period. In 1991, he was also a member of the Brisbane Bears Reserves premiership winning team that season in front of 75,230 people at Waverley Park.

Bell continued to be involved in football after his playing career ended joining the AFL as the Regional Development Manager with AFL Queensland and as a player with Central Districts in South Australia.

In 2009, he joined the Gold Coast Football Club in the role Community Programs Manager
