= Troy Lehmann =

Australian rules footballer

Personal information
- Full name: Troy Lehmann
- Born: 25 February 1972 (age 54); Waikerie SA
- Original teams: North Adelaide, Waikerie Football Club
- Draft: 82nd, 1989 VFL draft
- Height: 182 cm (6 ft 0 in)
- Weight: 80 kg (176 lb)

Playing career^{1}
Years	Club	Games (Goals)
1991–1993	Collingwood	31 (24)
1994	Brisbane Bears	13 (10)
Total		44 (34)
- ^{1} Playing statistics correct to the end of 1994.

Troy Lehmann (born 25 February 1972 in Waikerie SA) is a former Australian rules footballer who played with Collingwood and the Brisbane Bears in the Australian Football League (AFL) during the early 1990s.

Lehmann was picked up by Collingwood in the 1989 VFL draft, from South Australian National Football League (SANFL) club North Adelaide. He played his football mostly as a ruck-rover and kicked two goals on his AFL debut in 1991. Lehmann's 22 kicks and eight handballs in a convincing win over Adelaide at Victoria Park earned him maximum Brownlow Medal votes and he finished the year with an average of 20 disposals a game.

Hamstring problems troubled Lehmann during his league career and he put together just four appearances in 1993.

Before the 1994 AFL season, Lehmann was traded to Brisbane together with teammate Craig Starcevich and a draft pick used on Chris Scott. In return Collingwood gained a future captain and Brownlow Medal winner in Nathan Buckley. He now helps out at his local football club, Waikerie Football Club.
