= Craig Potter (Australian footballer) =

Australian rules footballer

Personal information
- Full name: Craig Potter
- Born: 19 January 1966 (age 60)
- Original team: Western Districts (QAFL)
- Height: 182 cm (6 ft 0 in)
- Weight: 84 kg (185 lb)

Playing career^{1}
Years	Club	Games (Goals)
1984, 1987–1990	Sydney Swans	42 (16)
1991–1992	Brisbane Bears	13 (3)
Total		55 (19)
- ^{1} Playing statistics correct to the end of 1992.

Craig Potter (born 19 January 1966) is a former Australian rules footballer who played with Sydney and Brisbane Bears in the Victorian/Australian Football League (VFL/AFL).

Queenslander Craig Potter was a strong performer for his state in the Teal Cup and played originally for Queensland Australian Football League (QAFL) club Western Districts.

Recruited by Sydney, Potter made his VFL debut in 1984, aged 18 but struggled with injuries. He played three games in 1984 but none in 1985 and 1986. The most games he put together was 14 in 1988 and in 1991 he was traded back home to Brisbane, in a deal which helped bring Warwick Capper back to Sydney.

Potter, a utility, spent just two seasons at Brisbane and finished his career in the SANFL with Central District. He won their 'Best and Fairest' award in 1993.
