= David Ogg =

Australian rules footballer

Personal information
- Full name: David Ogg
- Born: 23 November 1967 (age 58)
- Original team: Cloverdale
- Draft: 10th, 1990 AFL draft
- Height: 180 cm (5 ft 11 in)
- Weight: 70 kg (154 lb)

Playing career^{1}
Years	Club	Games (Goals)
1986–1994	Swan Districts	91 (111)
1991	Brisbane Bears	9 (3)
- ^{1} Playing statistics correct to the end of 1994.

David Ogg (born 23 November 1967) is a former Australian rules footballer who played with the Brisbane Bears in the Australian Football League (AFL).

Ogg was a half forward flanker in the Swan Districts team which won the 1990 WASFL Grand Final and in the same year represented Western Australia at interstate football. He was picked up by Brisbane with the 10th selection of the 1990 AFL draft, a pick they had received from Hawthorn after giving up Darren Jarman.

At the Bears Ogg was used on the ball and as a half back flanker, averaging 15 disposals from his nine games in 1991. He never experienced a win while in the seniors but was a member of the Brisbane reserves team which won the premiership that year, as a ruck-rover.

In the 1992 pre-season draft he was chosen by the West Coast Eagles and returned home to Perth. He never played an AFL game at his new club but continued playing with Swan Districts and topped their goal-kicking in 1994 with 45 goals.
