= Russell Morris (footballer) =

Australian rules footballer, born 1962

Personal information
- Full name: Russell Morris
- Nickname: The Fly
- Born: 1 June 1962 (age 64)
- Original team: North Shore Bombers
- Height: 191 cm (6 ft 3 in)
- Weight: 92 kg (203 lb)

Playing career^{1}
| Years | Club | Games (Goals) |
| 1984–1990 | Hawthorn | 93 (52) |
| 1991–1994 | St Kilda | 66 (32) |
| Total | | 159 (84) |
- ^{1} Playing statistics correct to the end of 1994.

Russell Morris (born 1 June 1962) is a former Australian rules footballer.

Morris was recruited from the North Shore Bombers in New South Wales. As a child, he grew up supporting the Richmond Football Club in the VFL.

Beginning his career with the Hawthorn Football Club in 1984, he went on to play 93 games and kick 52 goals for the club and played in the club's 1986 premiership side. In 1987, he represented Victoria in State of Origin and also in that year had a place in the All-Australian team. He had a clash with Jim Edmond that hurt his career as well as himself. As a key position player at Hawthorn, he competed for positions with champion stalwarts such as Peter Knights, Dermott Brereton and Chris Mew, often playing as a utility.

He moved to the St Kilda Football Club, where he played from 1991 to 1994, playing 66 games and booting 32 goals, interchanging between centre half-back and half-forward where he had a reasonable degree of success.

After he retired, he moved to Channel 7 as a boundary rider.

In 2004, Morris was chosen as a member of (AFL) Greek Team of the Century as one of his great-grandfathers was Greek.

Following his retirement he has made numerous television appearances and remains an active figure at the St Kilda Football Club.
