= Peter Worsfold =

Australian rules footballer

Personal information
- Full name: Peter Michael Worsfold
- Born: 11 July 1970 (age 56)
- Original team: South Fremantle
- Draft: 25th overall, 1990 AFL draft
- Height: 174 cm (5 ft 9 in)
- Weight: 85 kg (187 lb)

Playing career^{1}
Years	Club	Games (Goals)
1987–1990	South Fremantle	60 (43)
1991–1993	Brisbane Bears	31 (24)
1994–1999	South Fremantle	95 (90)
Total		186 (157)
- ^{1} Playing statistics correct to the end of 1994.

Peter Michael Worsfold (born 11 July 1970) is a former Australian rules footballer who played for the Brisbane Bears in the Australian Football League (AFL) during the early 1990s.

== Playing career ==
A Western Australian, Worsfold was taken by Brisbane with the 25th pick of the 1990 AFL draft. He debuted in 1991 and made ten league appearances for the year, all of which Brisbane lost, but he contributed a goal in all but one them. Worsfold was also part of Brisbane's premiership win in the reserves Grand Final in 1991. He had a career best 26 disposals in a loss to Richmond in 1992 but ended the year on a bad note when he was suspended for six matches after being found guilty of striking Geelong's Ken Hinkley. Worsfold returned to the team halfway through the 1993 season but it would be his last year at the club, retiring having experienced just three wins in 31 AFL games.

Worsfold rejoined his original club, South Fremantle, in 1994. As joint captain, with former Carlton player Jon Dorotich, Worsfold helped steer South Fremantle to the 1997 Westar Rules premiership.

In 2002, while playing with the Donnybrook Football Club, Worsfold broke the jaw of his Bunbury opponent, Beau Tann. The following year he fronted court, charged with grievous bodily harm but was found not guilty after arguing that the act wasn't deliberate and that he had bumped Tann with his shoulder while vying for the football.

== Coaching career ==
Worsfold joined his elder brother John as a development coach at the West Coast Eagles in 2007.

== Family ==
Peter is married with 3 children.
