= Rod Owen =

Australian rules footballer

Personal information
- Full name: Roderick Owen
- Born: 31 January 1967 (age 59)
- Original team: Mentone Grammar
- Height: 185 cm (6 ft 1 in)
- Weight: 87 kg (192 lb)

Playing career^{1}
Years	Club	Games (Goals)
1983–1990	St Kilda	60 (103)
1991	Melbourne	9 (19)
1992	Brisbane Bears	9 (21)
Total		81 (143)
- ^{1} Playing statistics correct to the end of 1992.

Roderick Owen (born 31 January 1967) is a former Australian rules footballer who played with St Kilda, Melbourne and the Brisbane Bears in the Victorian/Australian Football League (VFL/AFL).

Owen, who had only recently turned 16 when he made his league debut for St Kilda in 1983 against North Melbourne at Arden St Oval, suffered from various injuries early in his career and missed the entire 1985 VFL season. Owen had to wait until his 17th game, in 1986, to experience a win, with St Kilda having lost the previous 16 games he had played in. A Mentone Grammar recruit, Owen kicked a career high 39 goals in 1987, the second most by a St Kilda player that year behind Tony Lockett.

After leaving St Kilda in 1990 Owen played out the season at Victorian Football Association (VFA) club Frankston, and was then traded to Melbourne for Stephen Newport. He kicked two bags of five goals for Melbourne in 1991, against Carlton and North Melbourne. After just one year at Melbourne he was traded to Brisbane for the 1992 AFL season. Owen had a particularly strong game against Fitzroy at Princes Park when he kicked eight goals and six behinds, a club record against the Lions.

Once he finished in the AFL, Owen played for Northern Territory Football League (NTFL) side Wanderers Football Club, where he was club leading goalkicker in the 1994/95 season with 39 goals, also at Broadbeach Cats Cairns, Noosa Tigers and Cheltenham Football Clubs.

== Personal life ==
As a child in the 1970s, Owen attended Beaumaris Primary School, where he was one of a number of children to have been sexually assaulted by the school's librarian and sports coach, Darrell Ray. Trauma from this events, combined with the party culture at St Kilda in the 1980s, led to a decades-long battle with addiction to amphetamine and pain killers. In December 2000, Owen was sentenced to nine months in prison for assault, which he served at Dhurringile prison farm. Owen entered rehabilitation for his substance abuse issues in 2018, and has discussed his experiences with the media since the allegations against Ray from his time at Beaumaris PS become public in around 2020.

In later years Owen has worked as a concreter and boxer. In 2021, he received a written apology from the St Kilda FC relating to a lack of support for his personal issues during his time at the club. He has also pledged his brain to the Australian Sports Brain Bank for post-mortem research.

== Sources ==
- https://www.abc.net.au/news/2021-04-03/st-kilda-apologises-to-rod-owen-over-little-league-abuse-afl/100046586
- Lee, D. & Barfoot, M. (1995) NTFL, Northern Territory Football League: Darwin. ISBN 0-646-26754-X
