= Danny Noonan (Australian footballer) =

Australian rules footballer (born 1968)

Personal information
- Full name: Daniel Joseph Noonan
- Born: 29 November 1968 (age 57)
- Original teams: Mooroolbark Football Club, Eastern District Football League / Clarence (TFL Statewide)
- Debut: Round 3, 1991, Brisbane Bears vs. Carlton, at Princes Park
- Height: 188 cm (6 ft 2 in)
- Weight: 88 kg (194 lb)

Playing career^{1}
Years	Club	Games (Goals)
1991–1993	Brisbane Bears	55 (19)
- ^{1} Playing statistics correct to the end of 1993.

Danny Noonan (born 29 November 1968) is a former Australian rules footballer who played with the Brisbane Bears in the Australian Football League (AFL) during the early 1990s. He also spent time in Tasmania with Tasmanian Football League (TFL) club Clarence and was an interstate representative for Tasmania.

== Football career ==
Noonan, from Mooroolbark, was a reserves footballer at Carlton as a youngster but he left without making a senior appearance. He joined Clarence, playing his first TFL season in 1988 and winning their Best and Fairest award in 1990.

Brisbane recruited Noonan to the AFL with a pre-draft selection in 1990. A utility, he had 31 disposals in his debut game and played at Brisbane for three seasons before returning to Clarence.

In his second stint at Clarence he won two further Best and Fairests as well as back to back William Leitch Medals in 1995 and 1996. His 1995 medal caused a great divide and contention in the state and indeed the league when he was caught on camera deliberately king hitting superstar North Launceston on-baller Marcus Todman during the grand final.

His last TFL game was a premiership, with a Darrel Baldock Medal winning performance in the 1997 Grand Final win against Burnie.

== Post-football career ==
After his football career Noonan became a financial planner. In 2017 he pleaded guilty to 107 counts of fraudulently misappropriating, or stealing, $2.5 million from clients of his financial planning company to fund his gambling addiction. He was sentenced to six-and-a-half years in jail with a minimum sentence of just over three years.
