= Joe Cormack =

Australian rules footballer

Personal information
- Full name: Joseph Raymond Cormack
- Born: 30 August 1966 (age 60)
- Original team: Swan Districts
- Height: 178 cm (5 ft 10 in)
- Weight: 79 kg (174 lb)

Playing career^{1}
Years	Club	Games (Goals)
1988–1989	Swan Districts	61 (64)
1986–1989	West Coast Eagles	10 (7)
1990	Claremont	21 (36)
1991–1992	Fitzroy	26 (17)
1993	Frankston (VFA)	
Total		118 (124)
- ^{1} Playing statistics correct to the end of 1992.

Joseph Raymond Cormack (born 30 August 1966) is a former Australian rules footballer who played for the West Coast Eagles and Fitzroy in the Victorian/Australia Football League (VFL/AFL).

West Coast recruited Cormack from Swan Districts, where he had played since 1986. He spent two seasons with the West Coast Eagles but was unable to cement his spot in the team and was traded to Fitzroy, for Dale Kickett. At a much weaker club, Cormack was able to get regular games and when Fitzroy defeated Sydney at the SCG in 1992, his two goals and 31 disposals earned him three Brownlow Medal votes.

Cormark was a Western Australian State of Origin representative at the 1988 Adelaide Bicentennial Carnival.
