= List of AFL debuts in 1992 =

The 1992 Australia Football League (AFL) season was the 96th season of the VFL/AFL. The season saw 94 Australian rules footballers make their senior AFL debut and a further 56 transfer to new clubs having previously played in the AFL.

== Summary ==
Summary of debuts in 1992
Club	VFL debuts	Change of club
Adelaide	10	0
Brisbane Bears	8	5
Carlton	8	5
Collingwood	3	4
Essendon	9	2
Fitzroy	5	6
Footscray	5	2
Geelong	6	4
Hawthorn	3	3
Melbourne	11	3
North Melbourne	4	4
Richmond	4	5
St Kilda	3	6
Sydney Swans	11	5
West Coast	4	2
Total	94	56

== Debuts ==
Name	Club	Age at debut	Round debuted	Games	Goals	Notes
Ben Hart	Adelaide	17 years, 257 days	1	311	45	
David Pittman	Adelaide	23 years, 147 days	18	131	34	
Tony Modra	Adelaide	23 years, 41 days	4	118	440	
Anthony Ingerson	Adelaide	22 years, 161 days	1	37	25	
Stephen Schwerdt	Adelaide	23 years, 327 days	5	25	4	
Paul Rouvray	Adelaide	20 years, 98 days	19	21	2	
Jonathan Ross	Adelaide	18 years, 168 days	5	20	4	
Randall Bone	Adelaide	18 years, 143 days	3	12	13	
Brenton Sanderson	Adelaide	18 years, 59 days	6	6	4	
Adam Saliba	Adelaide	19 years, 348 days	15	3	2	
Michael Voss	Brisbane Bears	17 years, 11 days	18	289	245	1996 Brownlow medallist. Brother of Brett Voss.
Darryl White	Brisbane Bears	18 years, 283 days	1	268	165	Father of Will McDowell-White.
Ashley Green	Brisbane Bears	18 years, 365 days	3	23	2	
Steven McLuckie	Brisbane Bears	19 years, 45 days	2	20	8	
John Hutton	Brisbane Bears	25 years, 300 days	1	18	43	
Nigel Palfreyman	Brisbane Bears	18 years, 171 days	1	15	7	
Brendon Retzlaff	Brisbane Bears	22 years, 349 days	3	15	2	
Matthew Rendell	Brisbane Bears	33 years, 42 days	11	13	7	Previously played for Fitzroy.
Rod Owen	Brisbane Bears	25 years, 50 days	15	9	21	Previously played for St Kilda and Melbourne.
Russell Jeffrey	Brisbane Bears	26 years, 107 days	10	8	1	Father of Joel Jeffrey. Previously played for St Kilda.
Colin Alexander	Brisbane Bears	21 years, 344 days	1	5	2	Previously played for Collingwood.
Heath Shephard	Brisbane Bears	22 years, 239 days	7	4	1	Son of Graeme Shephard. Previously played for Collingwood.
Adam Kerinaiua	Brisbane Bears	18 years, 53 days	23	3	1	
Anthony Koutoufides	Carlton	19 years, 147 days	13	278	226	
Matthew Hogg	Carlton	23 years, 98 days	2	114	38	Previously played for Footscray.
Greg Williams	Carlton	28 years, 216 days	7	109	89	1986 and 1994 Brownlow Medallist. Previously played for Geelong and Sydney.
Ron De Iulio	Carlton	19 years, 31 days	1	104	71	
Earl Spalding	Carlton	27 years, 10 days	1	102	106	Also played first-class cricket for Western Australia. Brother of Scott Spalding. Previously played for Melbourne.
Brent Heaver	Carlton	21 years, 12 days	15	64	106	Previously played for Melbourne.
Rohan Welsh	Carlton	21 years, 194 days	5	42	59	
Brett Sholl	Carlton	20 years, 196 days	1	35	9	
Mark Athorn	Carlton	24 years, 135 days	1	30	6	Previously played for Footscray, Fitzroy and Sydney.
Paul McCormack	Carlton	22 years, 9 days	1	14	2	
Stephen Oliver	Carlton	21 years, 67 days	1	13	8	
Brendan Parker	Carlton	21 years, 76 days	12	5	3	
Ben Robertson	Carlton	20 years, 325 days	16	3	2	Father of Meg Robertson.
Saverio Rocca	Collingwood	18 years, 214 days	14	156	514	Also played Gridiron football for Philadelphia Eagles and Washington Redskins. Brother of Anthony Rocca.
Shane Watson	Collingwood	18 years, 40 days	2	141	102	
Gary Pert	Collingwood	26 years, 305 days	2	70	4	Son of Brian Pert. Previously played for Fitzroy.
Brad Rowe	Collingwood	22 years, 140 days	4	51	64	Son of Margaret Rowe. Previously played for Collingwood.
Mark Fraser	Collingwood	21 years, 103 days	9	45	23	Son of Ken Fraser.
Tony Woods	Collingwood	22 years, 270 days	2	18	6	Previously played for Fitzroy.
Brad Hardie	Collingwood	29 years, 303 days	21	2	2	1995 Brownlow Medallist. Previously played for Footscray and Brisbane.
James Hird	Essendon	19 years, 47 days	1	253	343	1996 Brownlow Medallist. Son of Allan Hird Jr. and grandson of Allan Hird Sr..
Joe Misiti	Essendon	17 years, 287 days	23	236	95	
Mark Mercuri	Essendon	18 years, 92 days	10	207	242	
Steven Alessio	Essendon	20 years, 197 days	10	184	193	Uncle of Liz and Matthew Watson.
Sean Denham	Essendon	22 years, 328 days	1	142	44	Previously played for Geelong.
Michael Symons	Essendon	20 years, 202 days	3	109	80	
David Calthorpe	Essendon	18 years, 350 days	20	92	58	
Glenn Kilpatrick	Essendon	19 years, 233 days	5	26	4	
Glenn Manton	Essendon	19 years, 68 days	21	21	4	
Willie Dick	Essendon	26 years, 6 days	1	7	6	Uncle of Brad Dick.
Brendan Bower	Essendon	25 years, 231 days	1	3	3	Previously played for Richmond.
Brad Boyd	Fitzroy	20 years, 308 days	13	70	49	Fitzroy's final VFL/AFL captain.
Jeremy Guard	Fitzroy	21 years, 262 days	2	68	17	
Marcus Seecamp	Fitzroy	19 years, 246 days	2	51	10	
Paul Abbott	Fitzroy	27 years, 156 days	2	26	13	Previously played for Hawthorn.
David Johnston	Fitzroy	23 years, 99 days	18	25	1	Previously played for Essendon.
Peter Sartori	Fitzroy	27 years, 255 days	16	23	19	Previously played for Carlton.
Paul Morrish	Fitzroy	23 years, 322 days	2	20	1	Previously played for Richmond and Essendon.
Dale Fleming	Fitzroy	20 years, 244 days	5	13	15	
Ashley Matthews	Fitzroy	25 years, 211 days	22	6	1	Previously played for Carlton.
Gavin Exell	Fitzroy	29 years, 178 days	4	5	2	Previously played for Geelong.
Chris Barrett	Fitzroy	19 years, 46 days	8	4	4	
Rohan Smith	Footscray	18 years, 296 days	1	300	254	
Steven Kretiuk	Footscray	19 years, 338 days	12	170	11	
Tony Campbell	Footscray	24 years, 222 days	1	43	4	Previously played for Melbourne.
Bernard Toohey	Footscray	29 years, 33 days	1	40	4	Previously played for Geelong and Sydney.
Michael Frost	Footscray	21 years, 168 days	13	13	3	
Gary Barrow	Footscray	22 years, 196 days	20	6	1	
John Cuzzupe	Footscray	18 years, 295 days	20	1	0	
Peter Riccardi	Geelong	19 years, 117 days	4	288	286	
Tim McGrath	Geelong	21 years, 166 days	1	219	18	Previously played for North Melbourne.
David Mensch	Geelong	19 years, 235 days	3	158	73	
John Barnes	Geelong	22 years, 294 days	1	144	65	Previously played for Essendon.
Steven Handley	Geelong	21 years, 242 days	1	73	28	
Adrian Hickmott	Geelong	20 years, 152 days	24	50	24	
Geoff Miles	Geelong	30 years, 71 days	1	20	25	Father of Teia Miles and father-in-law of Mitch Duncan. Previously played for Collingwood and West Coast.
Martin Heffernan	Geelong	19 years, 262 days	9	3	1	
Andrew MacNish	Geelong	26 years, 332 days	21	3	7	Previously played for West Coast.
Anthony Darcy	Geelong	20 years, 6 days	2	1	0	
Richard Taylor	Hawthorn	19 years, 18 days	20	112	46	
Jason Taylor	Hawthorn	23 years, 180 days	1	80	30	Grandson of Cliff "Beau" Taylor and son of Noel Taylor. Previously played for Fitzroy.
Austin McCrabb	Hawthorn	27 years, 89 days	6	9	1	Previously played for Geelong.
Ricky Nixon	Hawthorn	29 years, 22 days	6	8	6	Previously played for Carlton and St Kilda.
Phillip Murton	Hawthorn	18 years, 265 days	14	7	2	
Domenic Berry	Hawthorn	21 years, 7 days	14	1	0	
Matthew Febey	Melbourne	22 years, 314 days	15	143	44	Twin brother of Steven Febey.
Darren Kowal	Melbourne	20 years, 51 days	21	105	46	
Sean Charles	Melbourne	17 years, 5 days	10	47	60	
Andrew Lamprill	Melbourne	22 years, 329 days	2	36	3	
Chris Sullivan	Melbourne	19 years, 247 days	4	27	22	Son of Tony Sullivan.
Haydn Robins	Melbourne	19 years, 281 days	9	20	1	
Andy Goodwin	Melbourne	28 years, 296 days	5	17	0	Previously played for Richmond.
Michael Pickering	Melbourne	28 years, 119 days	2	15	12	Brother of Justin Pickering. Previously played for Richmond.
Grant Williams	Melbourne	22 years, 157 days	5	4	5	
Stephen Wearne	Melbourne	23 years, 254 days	13	3	2	Brother of David Wearne.
Wayne Lamb	Melbourne	19 years, 196 days	7	2	0	Father of Tom Lamb.
Brian Stynes	Melbourne	20 years, 237 days	10	2	0	Brother of David and Jim Stynes.
Wayne Henwood	Melbourne	29 years, 188 days	5	1	0	Previously played for Sydney.
Shane Burgmann	Melbourne	18 years, 235 days	24	1	0	Son of Lloyd Burgmann.
Glenn Archer	North Melbourne	19 years, 17 days	4	311	143	Father of Jackson Archer.
Alex Ishchenko	North Melbourne	27 years, 364 days	5	70	12	Previously played for Brisbane and West Coast.
Adam McCarthy	North Melbourne	20 years, 148 days	17	15	3	
Richard Dennis	North Melbourne	25 years, 241 days	2	13	6	Previously played for Carlton.
Kristian Bardsley	North Melbourne	19 years, 197 days	2	5	4	Previously known as Kristian Anning.
Glenn Page	North Melbourne	22 years, 60 days	10	5	0	Previously played for Sydney.
Mark Attard	North Melbourne	18 years, 18 days	22	3	2	
Marty Christensen	North Melbourne	26 years, 221 days	5	2	1	Brother of Damien Christensen and uncle of Allen Christensen. Previously played for Geelong.
Nick Daffy	Richmond	18 years, 322 days	2	165	181	
Stuart Edwards	Richmond	19 years, 251 days	2	46	52	
Bruce Lennon	Richmond	21 years, 147 days	6	28	7	
Todd Breman	Richmond	26 years, 152 days	2	25	24	Also played cricket for Western Australia. Previously played for West Coast.
Stevan Jackson	Richmond	22 years, 19 days	2	21	30	Previously played for West Coast.
Ian Herman	Richmond	26 years, 267 days	16	14	6	Previously played for Carlton.
Tim Livingstone	Richmond	24 years, 308 days	19	8	1	
Steven O'Dwyer	Richmond	26 years, 125 days	10	5	0	Previously played for Melbourne.
Brad Gwilliam	Richmond	25 years, 232 days	2	4	0	Previously played for West Coast.
Justin Peckett	St Kilda	19 years, 189 days	4	252	50	
Jamie Shanahan	St Kilda	24 years, 121 days	3	125	0	
Adrian Fletcher	St Kilda	21 years, 51 days	1	22	10	Father of Jaspa Fletcher. Previously played for Geelong.
Lawrence Bingham	St Kilda	21 years, 361 days	10	22	0	Previously played for Hawthorn.
Dale Kickett	St Kilda	23 years, 337 days	3	21	20	Cousin of Lance Franklin. Previously played for Fitzroy and West Coast.
John Georgiou	St Kilda	16 years, 210 days	7	16	2	
Darren Flanigan	St Kilda	30 years, 14 days	1	8	4	Previously played for Geelong.
Steven Clark	St Kilda	30 years, 312 days	1	6	7	Previously played for Essendon and Melbourne.
Michael Ford	St Kilda	29 years, 163 days	1	2	0	Previously played for Footscray.
Daryn Cresswell	Sydney Swans	21 years, 51 days	17	244	208	
Andrew Dunkley	Sydney Swans	23 years, 288 days	4	217	11	Father of Josh, Kyle and Lara Dunkley.
Jason Mooney	Sydney Swans	19 years, 30 days	16	97	51	Brother of Cameron Mooney.
Darren Kappler	Sydney Swans	27 years, 66 days	2	59	74	Previously played for Fitzroy.
Gavin Rose	Sydney Swans	22 years, 216 days	7	55	4	
Troy Gray	Sydney Swans	19 years, 58 days	6	51	24	
Simon Minton-Connell	Sydney Swans	22 years, 338 days	2	46	169	Nephew of Peter Hudson and cousin of Paul Hudson. Previously played for Carlton.
David Strooper	Sydney Swans	24 years, 33 days	2	32	58	Previously played for Fitzroy.
Robert Neill	Sydney Swans	18 years, 230 days	23	21	9	
Andrew McGovern	Sydney Swans	23 years, 357 days	2	20	7	Father of Jeremy and Mitch McGovern.
Gary Stevens	Sydney Swans	19 years, 227 days	10	5	1	Brother of Anthony and Michael Stevens.
Damien Angove	Sydney Swans	21 years, 191 days	15	4	0	
Alan Thorpe	Sydney Swans	23 years, 197 days	7	3	5	
Allan McKellar	Sydney Swans	25 years, 101 days	6	2	0	Previously played for Richmond.
Paul Atkins	Sydney Swans	23 years, 243 days	23	2	0	Brother of Simon Atkins.
Stuart Wigney	Sydney Swans	23 years, 77 days	16	1	0	Previously played for Footscray.
Daniel Metropolis	West Coast	20 years, 19 days	3	108	46	Son of Peter Metropolis.
Jason Ball	West Coast	19 years, 129 days	2	103	114	
Paul Harding	West Coast	27 years, 306 days	3	43	5	Previously played for Hawthorn and St Kilda.
Matt Clape	West Coast	23 years, 023 days	3	29	14	
Brendan Krummel	West Coast	19 years, 307 days	6	9	3	
Trent Nichols	West Coast	22 years, 357 days	2	4	3	Previously played for Richmond.
