= 1991 AFL draft =

Draft for the Australian Football League

The 1991 AFL draft is the annual draft of talented players by Australian rules football teams that participate in the main competition of that sport, the Australian Football League. It consisted of the main national draft, the pre-season draft and the trade period.

In 1991 there were 89 picks to be drafted between 15 teams in the main national draft.

== History ==
When the competition was known as the Victorian Football League (VFL), the league introduced the first incarnation of a draft system in 1981, where teams had two selections each of interstate players determined by reverse finishing position order. This was introduced as an equalisation strategy in response to the increasing transfer fees and player salaries at the time, which in combination with declining attendances, threatened to derail the league. It was also a result of the failure of country zoning, introduced in the late 1960s, which had led to a systematic inequality whereby the clubs with the best zones, like Carlton and Hawthorn, could dominate over clubs with poorer zones like Melbourne.

In 1986, the first VFL draft was held. The draft saw players tied to zones based on their location of residence, with each club having first call on players falling within that zone. The West Coast Eagles received access to all West Australian players, while the Brisbane Bears received six concessionary picks before the other clubs.

== Draft rules ==
The minimum draft age was 16. Clubs were allowed to select only one WA player each and South Australia was off-limits because of the introduction of Adelaide. Players in Queensland and NSW/ACT could only be selected by clubs other than the Brisbane Bears and Sydney Swans respectively, if the player was older than 19 and not required by the 'local' club. Faced with these restrictions the league reduced the number of choices from eight to six. In exchange for the SA moratorium, the Crows were excluded from the draft (they could pick any South Australian, but only South Australians).

== Background ==
The talent pool was clearly shallow and most clubs shied away from investing too much hope in the draft. A number of the Victorian clubs, notably Richmond and Fitzroy, couldn't afford to recruit established players so stuck with country footballers and young unproven youngsters. Clubs were believed to be looking to Tasmania as perhaps the only recruiting ground which hadn't been ravaged. The Under-19's competition was still in operation and clubs had only to list players who had been drafted, and those over the age of 19. Essendon and North Melbourne at this point for example had very talented reserves sides drawn from their metropolitan zones (these zones would later provide the basis for the Northern Knights Under-18 teams).

== Pre-draft picks ==
#	Player	Recruited by	Recruited from	Games with new team
1	Jason Ball	West Coast	Swan Districts (WAFL)	103

== Pre-draft trades ==
Player	Recruited by	Recruited from	Games played with club
Colin Alexander	Brisbane	Collingwood	5
Russell Jeffrey	Brisbane	St Kilda	8
Rod Owen	Brisbane	Melbourne	9
Brendon Retzlaff	Brisbane	Collingwood	15
Ron De Iulio	Carlton	North Melbourne	104
Earl Spalding	Carlton	Melbourne	102
Greg Williams	Carlton	Sydney	109
Brad Hardie	Collingwood	Brisbane	2
Gary Pert	Collingwood	Fitzroy	70
Brad Rowe	Collingwood	Brisbane	51
Tony Woods	Collingwood	Fitzroy	18
Sean Denham	Essendon	Geelong	142
Russell Evans	Essendon	North Melbourne	0
Shane Strempel	Essendon	Brisbane	0
Paul Abbott	Fitzroy	Hawthorn	26
Brad Boyd	Fitzroy	Collingwood	70
Dale Fleming	Fitzroy	Hawthorn	13
Ashley Matthews	Fitzroy	Carlton	6
Peter Sartori	Fitzroy	Carlton	23
Tony Campbell	Footscray	Melbourne	35
Darren Morgan	Footscray	Sydney	0
Ricky Jackson	Footscray	Melbourne	0
Bernard Toohey	Footscray	Sydney	40
John Barnes	Geelong	Essendon	144
Colin Gasden	Geelong	North Melbourne	0
John McNamara	Geelong	North Melbourne	0
Geoff Miles	Geelong	West Coast	20
Jason Taylor	Hawthorn	Fitzroy	80
Michael Pickering	Melbourne	Richmond	015
Tim Bourke	North Melbourne	Geelong	0
Richard Dennis	North Melbourne	Carlton	13
Stevan Jackson	Richmond	West Coast	21
Steven O'Dwyer	Richmond	Melbourne	5
Todd Breman	Richmond	West Coast	25
Craig O'Brien	St Kilda	Essendon	52
Adrian Fletcher	St Kilda	Geelong	22
Darren Flanigan	St Kilda	Geelong	8
Lawrence Bingham	St Kilda	Hawthorn	22
Darren Kappler	Sydney	Fitzroy	59
Gavin Rose	Sydney	Collingwood	55
Stuart Wigney	Sydney	Footscray	1
Simon Minton-Connell	Sydney	Carlton	46
Paul Gow	West Coast	Footscray	0
Paul Harding	West Coast	St Kilda	43
Trent Nichols	West Coast	Richmond	4
David Regan	West Coast	Richmond	4

== 1991 mid-season draft ==
Pick	Player	Recruited from	Recruited by
1	Ashley Byrne	Box Hill	Brisbane Lions
2	David Giles	Clarence	Fitzroy
3	Ernie Hug	Prahran	Sydney
4	Fraser Murphy	Carlton	Collingwood
5	Athas Hrysoulakis	Prahran	Richmond
6	Mark Naley	South Adelaide	Footscray
7	Brendan Parker	Tongala	Carlton
8	Michael Ryan	St Mary's	Hawthorn
9	Grant Williams	Sandy Bay	Melbourne
10	Stephen Zamykal	Williamstown	North Melbourne
11	Trevor Spencer	Melbourne	Geelong
12	Jason Briggs	Robinvale	St Kilda
13	David McMurray	Keilor	Essendon
14	Simon Kenny	Kedron Grange	Brisbane Lions
15	David Morrison	Melbourne	Fitzroy
16	Mark Stockdale	Traralgon	Sydney
17	Dean Strauch	Golden Square	Collingwood
18	Shane Fell	Glenorchy	Richmond
19	Paul Brown	Dandenong	Footscray
20	Trevor Robinson	Sturt	Carlton
21	Simon Palmer	Western Suburbs	Hawthorn
22	Stephen Wearne	Sandringham	Melbourne
23	Passed	N/A	North Melbourne
24	Steven Handley	Swan Districts	Geelong
25	Justin Pascoe	Whorouly	St Kilda
26	Rod Saunders	North Adelaide	Essendon
27	Peter Bennett	North Adelaide	Brisbane Lions
28	Alan Thorpe	Tatura	Fitzroy
29	Damian Hogan	Sale	Sydney
30	Passed	N/A	Collingwood
31	David Preston	Grovedale	Footscray
32	Passed	N/A	Carlton
33	Ross Hart	Golden Point	Hawthorn
34	Dean Smith	St Joseph's	Geelong
35	Passed	N/A	St Kilda
36	David Ryan	Terang	Brisbane Lions
37	Daryl Argus	Kyabram	Footscray
38	Passed	N/A	Carlton
39	Shaun Ballans	Lara	Hawthorn
40	Darren Enever	Werribee	Geelong
41	Passed	N/A	St Kilda
42	Tony Lithgow	Casterton	Geelong
43	Brad Nicholls	Bell Park	Geelong
44	Robert Gilbert	South Barwon	Geelong

== 1991 national draft ==
#	Player	Recruited by	Recruited from	Games with new team
1	John Hutton	Brisbane	Claremont	18
2	Marcus Seecamp	Fitzroy	East Perth	51
3	Darren Kowal	Melbourne	Claremont	105
4	Andrew McGovern	Sydney	Claremont	29
5	Jason Norrish	Melbourne	Claremont	20
6	Paul Burton	Sydney	Claremont	0
7	Jeremy Guard	Fitzroy	Claremont	68
8	Michael Symons	Essendon	Subiaco	109
9	Stephen O'Reilly	Geelong	Swan Districts	36
10	Andrew Lamprill	Melbourne	Hobart	33
11	Leigh Willison	Geelong	East Perth	3
12	Rob Malone	St Kilda	Claremont	0
13	Shane Crawford	Hawthorn	Finley (VCFL)	305
14	Fabian Francis	Brisbane	Southern District (NT)	22
15	Kieran O'Dwyer	Hawthorn	Barooga (NSW)	0
16	Daniel Metropolis	West Coast	Subiaco	108
17	Anthony Cole	Sydney	North Hobart	0
18	Matthew Hogg	Carlton	Footscray	114
19	Phil Gilbert	Melbourne	Claremont	25
20	Brett Cook	Fitzroy	Broken Hill (NSW)	25
21	Willie Dick	Essendon	Perth	7
22	Simon Crawshay	Hawthorn	Hawthorn	19
23	Mathew McKay	Melbourne	Hawthorn	0
24	Kane Morphett	West Coast	East Fremantle	0
25	Steven Davies	West Coast	Subiaco	0
26	Ben Herrald	Hawthorn	Hawthorn	0
27	Terry Board	Brisbane	Fitzroy	0
28	Cale O'Keefe	Carlton	South Launceston	0
29	Matthew Connell	West Coast	Subiaco	3
30	Kane Purcell	Collingwood	North Shore (T)	0
31	Haydon Kilmartin	Melbourne	North Hobart	0
32	Micah Berry	Melbourne	Melb. Gr. (APS)	0
33	Paul Morrish	Fitzroy	Essendon	20
34	Tim Leng	Nth Melbourne	Nth Melbourne	0
35	Darryl Donald	Geelong	Wangaratta (VCFL)	0
36	Jason Dullard	Melbourne	Essendon	0
37	Ryan O'Connor	Essendon	Ulverstone	63
38	Jamie Rundle	Footscray	Dandenong (VFA)	0
39	Richard Taylor	Hawthorn	Hawthorn	4
40	Nick White	Melbourne	Richmond	0
41	Todd Curley	Collingwood	West Perth	3
42	Peter Freeman	West Coast	St Kilda	0
43	David Strooper	Sydney	Fitzroy	32
44	Brett Sholl	Carlton	Nth Melbourne	35
45	Gary Barrow	Footscray	Essendon	6
46	Bruno Italiano	Collingwood	South Fremantle	0
47	Glenn Manton	Essendon	Essendon	21
48	Kevin Mitchell	Essendon	Claremont	0
49	Todd Hawes	Richmond	Swan Districts	0
50	Bruce Hando	Nth Melbourne	St Arnaud (VCFL)	0
51	Shaun Brooker	Richmond	Sydney	0
52	Mathew Henderson	Hawthorn	Morwell (VCFL)	0
53	Alistair Gray	St Kilda	Carey Grammar (APS)	0
54	Leigh Snooks	Carlton	Derinallum (VCFL))	0
55	Glenn Hoffman	Richmond	Essendon	0
56	Andrew Dunkley	Sydney	North Launceston	217
57	Anthony McDonald	Carlton	Carlton	0
58	Justin Pickering	Footscray	Richmond	0
59	Greg Turner	Collingwood	South Fremantle	0
60	James Billington	Essendon	Subiaco	0
61	Michael Addison	St Kilda	Carey Gr. (APS)	0
62	Peter Maclean	Geelong	Seymour (VCFL)	0
63	Brendan Bower	Essendon	Richmond	3
64	Chris Barrett	Fitzroy	Geelong	4
65	Heath Shephard	Brisbane	Burnie Hawks (T)	4
66	Nick Roney	Richmond	North Launceston	0
67	Shane Ellen	Footscray	Footscray (VCFL)	11
68	Mathew Bell	Sydney	Sydney	0
69	Brad Sholl	North Melbourne	North Melbourne	2
70	Jon Lister	Collingwood	Sandy Bay (T)	0
71	Luke Chambers	Brisbane	Brisbane	0
72	Michael Shields	St Kilda	St Kilda	0
73	Cameron Burke	Geelong	Warragul (VCFL)	0
74	Brendan Krummel	West Coast	East Fremantle	9
75	Travis Edmonds	Hawthorn	Swan Districts	0
76	Matt Rendell	Brisbane	Fitzroy	13
77	Jay Burton	Richmond	Subiaco	0
78	Mathew Dickson	Carlton	Sandhurst (VCFL)	0
79	Bevan Smillie	Carlton	Essendon	0
80	Damian Ryan	Footscray	Coburg (VFA)	0
81	Brendan Barrows	Collingwood	Claremont	0
82	Scott Morrison	St Kilda	Nth Melbourne	0
83	Peter Jacks	Geelong	Ballarat YCW (VCFL)	0
84	Alistair Burke	Hawthorn	Hawthorn	0
85	John Kennedy	Richmond	Hawthorn	0
86	Jamie Madigan	Footscray	Footscray	0
87	Sam Jones	St Kilda	Sandy Bay	3
88	Aiden Bussell	Hawthorn	Whorouly (VCFL)	0
89	Paul Dimattina	Richmond	Richmond	0

== 1992 pre-season draft ==
#	Player	Recruited by	Recruited from	Games with new team
1	Ashley Green	Brisbane Bears	Essendon	23
2	Gavin Exell	Fitzroy	Geelong	5
3	Mark McQueen	Richmond	Richmond	34
4	Damien Mellow	Sydney Swans	Adelaide	0
5	Mark Athorn	Carlton	Sydney Swans	15
6	Greg Jones	Footscray	St Kilda	0
7	Alex Ishchenko	North Melbourne	Brisbane Bears	70
8	Ross Napoli	Collingwood	Essendon	0
9	Alan Schwartz	Essendon	Essendon	0
10	Michael Ford	St Kilda	Footscray	2
11	Wayne Henwood	Melbourne	Sydney Swans	1
12	Tim McGrath	Geelong	North Melbourne	219
13	Tim Watson	West Coast Eagles	Essendon	0
14	Ricky Nixon	Hawthorn	St Kilda	8
15	Jason Jones	Brisbane Bears	Darwin (NTFL)	0
16	Danny Sexton	Fitzroy	North Melbourne	0
17	David Honybun	Richmond	Richmond	16
18	Alan Thorpe	Sydney Swans	Fitzroy	3
19	Paul McCormack	Carlton	Dandenong (VFA)	14
20	Mark Majerczak	Footscray	Carlton	0
21	Marty Christensen	North Melbourne	Geelong	2
22	Ross Johns	Collingwood	Carlton	0
23	Paul McMaster	Essendon	Carlton	0
24	Steven Clark	St Kilda	Melbourne	6
25	Andy Goodwin	Melbourne	Richmond	17
26	Garry Phillips	Geelong	Geelong	0
27	David Ogg	West Coast Eagles	Brisbane Bears	0
28	Ernie Hug Jr.	Hawthorn	Prahran (VFA)	0
29	Darren Bartsch	Brisbane Bears	West Adelaide (SANFL)	0
30	Simon Taylor	Fitzroy	Montmorency	0
31	Brad Gwilliam	Richmond	West Coast Eagles	4
32	Allan McKellar	Footscray	Sydney Swans	0
33	Rohan Welsh	Carlton	Dandenong (VFA)	42
34	Paul Satterley	Footscray	Footscray	0
35	Leigh Tudor	North Melbourne	North Melbourne	3
36	Paul Docherty	Collingwood	Essendon	0
37	Glenn Kilpatrick	Essendon	North Melbourne	0
38	Dale Kickett	St Kilda	West Coast Eagles	21
39	Ben Judd	Melbourne	Sturt (SANFL)	0
40	Ben Graham	Geelong	Geelong	219
41	Jason Disney	Richmond	West Coast Eagles	0
42	Austin McCrabb	Hawthorn	Geelong	9
43	Matthew Clarke	Richmond	Brisbane Bears	0
44	Simon Dennis	Richmond	Richmond	2
45	Andrew Peck	Sydney Swans	Sydney Swans	0
46	Paul Tuddenham	Carlton	Collingwood	0
47	Glenn Page	North Melbourne	Sydney Swans	5
48	Derek Percival	Collingwood	Collingwood	0
49	Justin Peckett	St Kilda	St Kilda	252
50	Cristian O'Brien	Melbourne	Melbourne	2
51	Campbell Black	Brisbane Bears	Southport	0
52	Adam Jones	Xavier College	Richmond	0
53	Phil Krakouer	Footscray	Sydney Swans	0
54	Jeremy Smith	Carlton	Carlton	1
55	Michael Scoon	North Melbourne	North Melbourne	0
56	Pass	-	Carlton	
