= List of VFL debuts in 1987 =

The 1987 Victorian Football League (VFL) season was the ninety-first season of the VFL. The season saw 143 Australian rules footballers make their senior VFL debut and 67 players transfer to new clubs having previously played in the VFL.

== Summary ==
Summary of debuts in 1987
Club	VFL debuts	Change of club
Brisbane	10	31
Carlton	8	0
Collingwood	17	4
Essendon	9	4
Fitzroy	12	3
Footscray	11	3
Geelong	8	0
Hawthorn	6	0
Melbourne	7	3
North Melbourne	8	1
Richmond	10	3
St Kilda	6	5
Sydney	5	3
West Coast	26	7
Total	143	67

== Debuts ==
Name	Club	Age at debut	Round debuted	Games	Goals	Notes
Brad Hardie	Brisbane Bears	24 years, 168 days	1	101	192	1985 Brownlow Medallist. Previously played for Footscray.
Michael Richardson	Brisbane Bears	28 years, 11 days	1	81	43	Brother of Stephen Richardson. Previously played for Collingwood and Essendon.
Matthew Campbell	Brisbane Bears	23 years, 56 days	1	79	28	
David O'Keeffe	Brisbane Bears	25 years, 35 days	1	68	25	Previously played for Geelong.
Mark Williams	Brisbane Bears	28 years, 218 days	1	66	58	Coached Port Adelaide to 2004 AFL Premiership. Previously played for Collingwood.
Brenton Phillips	Brisbane Bears	24 years, 142 days	1	61	30	Previously played for Essendon.
Phil Walsh	Brisbane Bears	27 years, 12 days	1	60	18	Previously played for Collingwood and Richmond.
Geoff Raines	Brisbane Bears	30 years, 229 days	1	59	20	Father of Andrew Raines. Previously played for Richmond, Collingwood and Essendon.
Mark Roberts	Brisbane Bears	21 years, 272 days	1	59	14	Previously played for Sydney.
Steve Reynoldson	Brisbane Bears	24 years, 202 days	1	58	17	Previously played for Geelong.
Bernie Harris	Brisbane Bears	24 years, 214 days	1	56	58	Brother of Leon Harris. Previously played for Fitzroy.
Michael Gibson	Brisbane Bears	21 years, 226 days	12	52	3	Previously played for Fitzroy.
Mark Mickan	Brisbane Bears	26 years, 56 days	1	48	26	Inaugural captain of the Brisbane Bears.
Peter Banfield	Brisbane Bears	22 years, 65 days	1	45	16	Previously played for Essendon.
Cameron O'Brien	Brisbane Bears	20 years, 180 days	1	44	65	Son of Jim O'Brien. Previously played for Collingwood.
Mark Withers	Brisbane Bears	23 years, 124 days	15	36	29	Previously played for Melbourne.
Chris Waterson	Brisbane Bears	26 years, 1 days	1	35	8	Previously played for Essendon.
Dale Dickson	Brisbane Bears	24 years, 267 days	1	30	3	Previously played for Melbourne.
John Fidge	Brisbane Bears	20 years, 327 days	1	27	38	Brother of Ted Fidge. Previously played for Melbourne.
Michael McCarthy	Brisbane Bears	29 years, 168 days	1	27	9	Previously played for Hawthorn.
Darren Carlson	Brisbane Bears	20 years, 32 days	11	25	7	
Jim Edmond	Brisbane Bears	28 years, 205 days	1	17	42	Brother of Bob Edmond. Previously played for Footscray and Sydney.
Ken Judge	Brisbane Bears	29 years, 171 days	15	17	18	Previously played for Hawthorn.
Neil Hein	Brisbane Bears	23 years, 293 days	1	15	12	
Frank Dunell	Brisbane Bears	29 years, 25 days	3	15	4	Father of Sam Dunell. Previously played for Essendon.
Ben Harris	Brisbane Bears	23 years, 303 days	5	14	6	
Rod MacPherson	Brisbane Bears	23 years, 303 days	8	7	3	Brother of Stephen MacPherson. Previously played for Footscray.
Gary Shaw	Brisbane Bears	28 years, 50 days	2	6	5	Previously played for Collingwood.
Tony Beckett	Brisbane Bears	26 years, 304 days	5	6	2	
Stephen Williams	Brisbane Bears	25 years, 310 days	3	4	1	Son of Fos Williams and brother of Mark and Jenny Williams.
Mark Buckley	Brisbane Bears	24 years, 237 days	4	4	2	Grandson of Jack Buckley, son of Brian Buckley and brother of Stephen Buckley. Previously played for Carlton and St Kilda.
Peter Smith	Brisbane Bears	27 years, 90 days	5	4	1	Previously played for North Melbourne.
Stuart Glascott	Brisbane Bears	22 years, 64 days	19	4	0	Brother of David Glascott.
Neil Gaghan	Brisbane Bears	24 years, 54 days	8	3	0	Previously played for Carlton.
Adam Garton	Brisbane Bears	25 years, 133 days	10	3	1	
Chris Stacey	Brisbane Bears	21 years, 106 days	11	3	5	Previously played for Fitzroy.
Craig Evans	Brisbane Bears	22 years, 108 days	12	2	2	Previously played for Geelong.
Darryl Cox	Brisbane Bears	26 years, 68 days	2	1	1	Father of Montana Cox. Previously played for Fitzroy and Melbourne.
Rick Norman	Brisbane Bears	23 years, 268 days	4	1	0	Previously played for North Melbourne.
Allan Giffard	Brisbane Bears	23 years, 233 days	9	1	0	
Jamie Duursma	Brisbane Bears	23 years, 282 days	21	1	0	Previously played for Sydney.
Mark Naley	Carlton	26 years, 17 days	1	65	74	
Ian Aitken	Carlton	19 years, 323 days	2	61	10	
Richard Dennis	Carlton	20 years, 247 days	2	57	40	
Peter Sartori	Carlton	22 years, 155 days	1	54	119	
Ian Herman	Carlton	22 years, 155 days	11	48	39	
Jamie Dunlop	Carlton	21 years, 103 days	4	21	3	
Mark Majerczak	Carlton	19 years, 40 days	10	17	20	
Michael Gallagher	Carlton	21 years, 0 days	7	16	17	
Gavin Brown	Collingwood	19 years, 184 days	1	254	195	
Gavin Crosisca	Collingwood	18 years, 194 days	1	246	64	
Mick McGuane	Collingwood	19 years, 215 days	18	152	128	
Michael Christian	Collingwood	22 years, 219 days	1	133	21	
Craig Starcevich	Collingwood	19 years, 316 days	1	124	162	Uncle of Brandon Starcevich.
Alan Richardson	Collingwood	21 years, 357 days	7	114	10	Coach of St Kilda 2014–2019.
Paul Tuddenham	Collingwood	19 years, 342 days	21	40	32	Son of Des Tuddenham.
Jason Croall	Collingwood	19 years, 178 days	2	37	4	
Graeme Atkins	Collingwood	23 years, 163 days	3	21	14	Previously played for North Melbourne.
Terry Keays	Collingwood	20 years, 11 days	4	21	14	Grandson of Fred Keays and uncle of Ben Keays.
Athas Hrysoulakis	Collingwood	18 years, 82 days	1	19	15	
Grantley Fielke	Collingwood	25 years, 10 days	1	16	15	
Paul Morwood	Collingwood	28 years, 26 days	1	15	2	Brother of Shane and Tony Morwood. Previously played for South Melbourne, Sydney and St Kilda.
Glenn Howard	Collingwood	24 years, 131 days	1	14	4	Previously played for Hawthorn.
Brett Yorgey	Collingwood	26 years, 238 days	11	11	7	
Tim Harrington	Collingwood	26 years, 238 days	8	8	0	Previously played for North Melbourne.
Mark Perkins	Collingwood	23 years, 63 days	17	8	12	
Mark Orval	Collingwood	19 years, 121 days	16	7	7	
John Mrakov	Collingwood	18 years, 257 days	18	3	0	
Neil Brindley	Collingwood	19 years, 244 days	1	1	0	
Greg Faull	Collingwood	18 years, 164 days	19	1	0	
Gary O'Donnell	Essendon	22 years, 110 days	22	243	88	
Dean Wallis	Essendon	17 years, 262 days	8	127	42	
Chris Daniher	Essendon	21 years, 117 days	17	124	40	Brother of Anthony, Neale and Terry Daniher.
Anthony Daniher	Essendon	24 years, 66 days	5	118	18	Brother of Chris, Neale and Terry Daniher and father of Joe and Darcy Daniher. Previously played for Sydney.
John Barnes	Essendon	17 years, 335 days	6	58	25	
David Johnston	Essendon	18 years, 36 days	8	41	6	
Gavin Keane	Essendon	21 years, 37 days	3	29	18	
Tony Antrobus	Essendon	24 years, 361 days	2	22	26	1983 Magarey Medallist.
Peter Francis	Essendon	29 years, 71 days	1	19	2	Previously played for Carlton, Fitzroy and Richmond.
David Sullivan	Essendon	29 years, 71 days	13	10	14	Previously played for Hawthorn.
Daryl Cunningham	Essendon	26 years, 186 days	10	7	5	Brother of Geoff Cunningham. Previously played for St Kilda.
Brendon Moore	Essendon	18 years, 21 days	22	7	1	
Geoffrey Parker	Essendon	19 years, 94 days	15	3	0	Also played cricket for South Australia and Victoria.
Brett Stephens	Fitzroy	26 years, 036 days	1	133	52	
Matt Armstrong	Fitzroy	20 years, 27 days	1	132	71	
Darren Kappler	Fitzroy	22 years, 64 days	1	87	51	
David Strooper	Fitzroy	19 years, 185 days	22	43	28	
Keith Thomas	Fitzroy	25 years, 230 days	4	28	15	
Mark Trewella	Fitzroy	20 years, 295 days	4	23	4	
Tony Carafa	Fitzroy	18 years, 333 days	17	16	8	
Ken Hinkley	Fitzroy	20 years, 192 days	3	11	21	
Darren Handley	Fitzroy	23 years, 177 days	12	10	7	Previously played for Collingwood.
Robert Bolzon	Fitzroy	19 years, 314 days	22	5	3	
Chris Duthy	Fitzroy	25 years, 282 days	1	3	0	
Michael Roberts	Fitzroy	27 years, 316 days	11	2	1	Previously played for St Kilda and Richmond.
Allan Sidebottom	Fitzroy	28 years, 169 days	13	1	0	Brother of Garry Sidebottom. Previously played for St Kilda.
Paul McLean	Fitzroy	22 years, 205 days	17	1	0	Son of Tom McLean and brother of Glenn McLean.
Christopher Taylor	Fitzroy	21 years, 76 days	20	1	0	
Steven Kolyniuk	Footscray	17 years, 141 days	20	177	198	
Simon Atkins	Footscray	18 years, 103 days	2	127	76	Brother of Paul Atkins.
Richard Cousins	Footscray	24 years, 258 days	1	60	21	
Troy Moloney	Footscray	20 years, 314 days	1	36	4	
Phil Cronan	Footscray	27 years, 254 days	1	26	5	Previously played for St Kilda.
Darren Collins	Footscray	19 years, 245 days	16	24	37	Previously played for Collingwood.
Lynton Fitzpatrick	Footscray	20 years, 182 days	16	18	4	
Mark Athorn	Footscray	19 years, 190 days	8	17	4	
Ron James	Footscray	16 years, 157 days	3	16	6	
Shane Williams	Footscray	27 years, 268 days	7	13	9	Previously played for Richmond and Geelong.
Brenton Vilcins	Footscray	20 years, 317 days	1	8	0	
Cameron Wright	Footscray	18 years, 208 days	3	2	0	
Andrew Howlett	Footscray	19 years, 291 days	6	2	1	
Frank Lesiputty	Footscray	19 years, 312 days	15	2	1	
Garry Hocking	Geelong	18 years, 185 days	3	274	243	Brother of Steve Hocking.
Mark Bairstow	Geelong	23 years, 247 days	1	146	172	
Gavin Exell	Geelong	24 years, 177 days	3	58	113	
Dwayne Russell	Geelong	22 years, 24 days	1	50	51	
Sean Denham	Geelong	18 years, 116 days	21	44	21	
Austin McCrabb	Geelong	22 years, 208 days	21	36	4	
Gary Cameron	Geelong	20 years, 359 days	11	26	18	
Peter Baldwin	Geelong	18 years, 328 days	17	5	1	
Andrew Collins	Hawthorn	21 years, 360 days	4	212	37	
Darrin Pritchard	Hawthorn	21 years, 56 days	8	211	94	
Anthony Condon	Hawthorn	19 years, 182 days	11	145	49	
Paul Dear	Hawthorn	20 years, 174 days	13	120	80	1991 Norm Smith Medallist. Brother of Greg Dear.
Paul Harding	Hawthorn	22 years, 333 days	6	11	2	
Tony Symonds	Hawthorn	25 years, 41 days	1	3	1	
Jim Stynes	Melbourne	20 years, 353 days	3	264	130	1991 Brownlow Medallist. Grandson of Joe Stynes and brother of Brian and David Stynes.
Todd Viney	Melbourne	20 years, 363 days	1	233	92	Caretaker coach of Melbourne in 2011. Father of Jack Viney and brother of Jay Viney.
Glenn Lovett	Melbourne	17 years, 325 days	12	127	74	
Earl Spalding	Melbourne	22 years, 17 days	1	109	68	Played first-class cricket for Western Australia. Brother of Scott Spalding.
Steven O'Dwyer	Melbourne	21 years, 89 days	4	84	45	
Warren Dean	Melbourne	23 years, 19 days	1	32	25	
Doug Koop	Melbourne	26 years, 263 days	18	24	5	Previously played for Sydney and North Melbourne.
Dean Chiron	Melbourne	26 years, 120 days	16	17	1	Previously played for St Kilda and Footscray.
Bradley Sparks	Melbourne	19 years, 254 days	6	4	4	
Peter Kiel	Melbourne	28 years, 206 days	5	1	0	Previously played for St Kilda.
Craig Sholl	North Melbourne	19 years, 187 days	15	235	165	
Brett Allison	North Melbourne	18 years, 312 days	2	228	285	Son of Tom Allison.
Alastair Clarkson	North Melbourne	19 years, 68 days	15	93	61	
Dean McRae	North Melbourne	18 years, 142 days	2	81	25	
Mark Hepburn	North Melbourne	18 years, 337 days	18	56	29	
Jeff Chandler	North Melbourne	21 years, 148 days	19	50	4	
Paul Bryce	North Melbourne	18 years, 343 days	13	48	26	
Shaun Smith	North Melbourne	17 years, 300 days	4	47	38	
John Mossop	North Melbourne	27 years, 286 days	1	37	15	Previously played for Geelong.
Tony Free	Richmond	18 years, 49 days	20	133	46	
Michael Mitchell	Richmond	25 years, 124 days	1	81	103	
Andy Goodwin	Richmond	24 years, 47 days	20	73	9	
Peter Wilson	Richmond	23 years, 134 days	1	54	39	
Michael Thomson	Richmond	25 years, 123 days	1	42	15	Previously played for Essendon.
Richard Nixon	Richmond	21 years, 227 days	12	37	3	Not the U.S. president.
Michael Laffy	Richmond	19 years, 170 days	2	26	0	Appeared on the second season of the Australian version of The Mole.
Terry Wallace	Richmond	28 years, 119 days	3	11	7	Father of Brent Wallace. Previously played for Hawthorn.
Darren Bower	Richmond	19 years, 158 days	14	3	2	Brother of Brendan and Nathan Bower.
Peter Burke	Richmond	22 years, 363 days	9	2	0	Previously played for Fitzroy.
David Buttifant	Richmond	23 years, 80 days	9	2	0	
Renato Dintinosante	Richmond	24 years, 90 days	21	2	0	
Tony Pastore	Richmond	21 years, 16 days	6	1	0	
Nathan Burke	St Kilda	17 years, 92 days	7	323	124	
Nicky Winmar	St Kilda	21 years, 184 days	1	230	283	
Dean Rice	St Kilda	21 years, 184 days	1	116	43	Father of Bailey Rice.
Ken Sheldon	St Kilda	27 years, 82 days	1	53	24	Father of Sam Sheldon. Previously played for Carlton.
Russell Jeffrey	St Kilda	21 years, 141 days	14	42	3	
Spiro Kourkoumelis	St Kilda	23 years, 247 days	2	35	15	Previously played for Carlton.
Alex Marcou	St Kilda	28 years, 265 days	1	24	17	Previously played for Carlton.
Robert Neal	St Kilda	30 years, 137 days	1	20	1	Previously played Geelong.
Warwick Green	St Kilda	20 years, 203 days	17	9	0	
Paul Tilley	St Kilda	23 years, 50 days	21	2	0	Previously played for Fitzroy.
Rodney Gladman	St Kilda	19 years, 128 days	14	1	0	
Leon Higgins	Sydney	19 years, 57 days	21	122	80	
Neil Cordy	Sydney	28 years, 12 days	4	96	4	Brother of Graeme and Brian Cordy and uncle of Ayce and Zaine Cordy. Previously played for Footscray.
Wayne Henwood	Sydney	24 years, 164 days	1	78	45	
Matthew Lloyd	Sydney	21 years, 274 days	7	22	5	
Michael Phyland	Sydney	21 years, 244 days	10	22	6	
Graeme Cordy	Sydney	24 years, 199 days	7	21	6	Brother of Brian and Neil Cordy. Previously played for Footscray.
Michael Byrne	Sydney	28 years, 201 days	13	21	12	Previously played for Melbourne and Hawthorn.
Peter Quirk	Sydney	20 years, 138 days	12	7	1	
Chris Lewis	West Coast	18 years, 12 days	1	215	259	
John Worsfold	West Coast	18 years, 205 days	4	209	37	Brother of Peter Worsfold.
Chris Mainwaring	West Coast	21 years, 106 days	3	201	84	
David Hart	West Coast	23 years, 53 days	5	184	95	
Michael Brennan	West Coast	21 years, 273 days	1	179	20	
Dwayne Lamb	West Coast	25 years, 99 days	1	151	44	
Andrew Lockyer	West Coast	21 years, 292 days	5	78	35	
Geoff Miles	West Coast	25 years, 78 days	1	71	33	Father of Teia Miles. Previously played for Collingwood.
Steve Malaxos	West Coast	25 years, 283 days	1	66	30	Previously played for Hawthorn.
Phil Scott	West Coast	26 years, 85 days	3	66	41	
John Annear	West Coast	25 years, 285 days	1	58	40	Previously played for Collingwood and Richmond.
Dean Turner	West Coast	27 years, 194 days	4	56	28	Previously played for Fitzroy.
Paul Peos	West Coast	19 years, 60 days	1	55	34	
Dean Laidley	West Coast	20 years, 2 days	1	52	11	
Adrian Barich	West Coast	23 years, 114 days	1	47	27	
Ross Glendinning	West Coast	30 years, 193 days	1	40	111	Previously played for North Melbourne.
Laurie Keene	West Coast	26 years, 56 days	1	36	38	
Mark Zanotti	West Coast	22 years, 141 days	1	36	6	
Alex Ishchenko	West Coast	22 years, 141 days	1	30	10	
John Gastev	West Coast	22 years, 236 days	2	30	31	
Murray Wrensted	West Coast	22 years, 215 days	1	29	12	
Wally Matera	West Coast	23 years, 201 days	1	24	26	Brother of Peter and Phillip Matera and father of Brandon Matera.
Don Holmes	West Coast	28 years, 83 days	1	23	40	
Andrew MacNish	West Coast	21 years, 199 days	1	23	36	
Michael O'Connell	West Coast	25 years, 85 days	3	20	13	Son of John O'Connell, brother of David O'Connell and uncle of John Williams.
Phil Narkle	West Coast	26 years, 59 days	1	18	18	Brother of Keith Narkle. Previously played for St Kilda.
Robert Wiley	West Coast	32 years, 19 days	3	18	24	Previously played for Richmond.
Darren Bennett	West Coast	22 years, 79 days	1	4	7	Member of the NFL 1990s All-Decade Team.
Glen Bartlett	West Coast	22 years, 298 days	2	4	0	
Peter Davidson	West Coast	23 years, 212 days	1	2	0	
Glenn O'Loughlin	West Coast	27 years, 316 days	8	1	0	
Sean King	West Coast	23 years, 63 days	22	1	2	
Paul Mifka	West Coast	22 years, 24 days	22	1	0	
