= Melbourne Hawks =

Names
- Full name: Melbourne Hawks Football Club (incorporating Hawthorn & Melbourne Football Clubs) Ltd
- Nickname: Hawks

Club details
- Founded: 1996; 30 years ago
- Dissolved: 16 September 1996; 30 years ago
- Colours: Navy Blue Red Gold
- Competition: Australian Football League

The Melbourne Hawks was a planned Australian Football League (AFL) team that would have consisted of the merger between the Melbourne Football Club and Hawthorn Football Club clubs at the end of the 1996 season.

Out of all the proposed merger combinations in the 1990s, it appeared to be the most ideal— Hawthorn had a football team which had success (eight premierships in the previous 25 years) but were in a dire financial situation, while Melbourne had sound financial base but had not won a premiership for over 30 years.

Following a vote of members from both clubs on 16 September 1996, which saw Melbourne members narrowly vote in favour while Hawthorn members overwhelmingly voted against, the proposed merger did not proceed. Both clubs have continued to compete in their own right in the AFL.

== Background ==
Since the mid-1980s, the formerly all-Victorian-based Victorian Football League (VFL) competition had undertaken a large expansion program which saw the league expand from being a state-based competition (centred around the inner suburbs of Melbourne) to a national competition. The decision to undertake this expansion was in response to elite national leagues being run by other sporting codes (for example the Australian Rugby League, the National Basketball League, and the National Soccer League), which threatened to undermine interest in football at both a junior and elite level. The VFL expansion included new teams from Perth, Adelaide, and Brisbane, in addition to the relocation of South Melbourne to Sydney, and saw the league change its name from the VFL to the Australian Football League (AFL).

The expansion led to Victoria holding a disproportionately large number of teams relative to the other states. By the mid-1990s, there were eleven teams based in Victoria – ten of those in the inner suburbs of Melbourne – and concerns were raised about the long term viability (both on the field, and economically) of some of the weaker Melbourne-based clubs. Members of the AFL Commission (the governing body for the competition) began to worry that, relative to the new interstate clubs and more powerful Victorian-based teams, the weaker Melbourne-based clubs would not have a sufficiently large supporter base to survive in the new national competition. Statistics published in newspapers like the Herald Sun showed that several Melbourne-based clubs (including Hawthorn and Melbourne) only had a fraction of the membership base of either their interstate or cross-town rivals. It was suggested by some at the time that the Melbourne market could realistically support no more than six to eight teams.

The AFL, under CEO Ross Oakley, proposed that the preferred outcome for these smaller Melbourne-based clubs would be to merge (or amalgamate) with other smaller teams. According to the AFL at the time, mergers would create super-clubs which would retain at least some of the traditions and history of its former teams; clearly preferable to having both teams eventually financially collapse. Merging with other Melbourne-based clubs, rather than relocating interstate, would allow local supporters to continue attending their teams' matches. Based on this logic, the AFL undertook an active program of pursuing mergers between Melbourne-based clubs. The AFL began this policy by offering A$6 million to any newly merged football team (an offer which grew to A$8 million by mid-1996).

Within Melbourne, discussions about potential mergers were often greeted with deep suspicion and open hostility. While the growth of a national competition from the former VFL has arguably been highly beneficial to the code of Australian rules football overall, throughout the 1980s and 1990s, many Melburnians were opposed to reform attempts. The merger debate led to widespread accusations that the league's administrators had grown out-of-touch with the sport's grass-roots supporter base. The league openly discussing the elimination of some Melbourne-based clubs through mergers led to widespread anger, and disillusionment, towards the league.

== Merger proposals ==
Upon pressure and incentives from the league, and saturation of the dire warnings about the consequences of too many teams based in Melbourne, a number of Melbourne-based clubs began investigating and pursuing potential mergers. Some proposals raised in the local media included various combinations of Melbourne, Hawthorn, St Kilda, Footscray, Fitzroy, North Melbourne and Richmond, and only a late fightback campaign had averted a merger between Fitzroy and Footscray in 1989. Carlton, Collingwood, Essendon, Geelong were generally exempt from these proposals due to their financial success.

=== Case for a merger ===
Of the potential mergers that were speculated about in the media, the one which perhaps seemed to make the most sense was the potential merger between Melbourne and Hawthorn. On the surface, the merger appeared to make sense for a number of reasons:

- Throughout the 1980s and early 1990s, Hawthorn had fielded exceptional teams which had won the club a succession of grand final appearances (eight in nine years) and premierships (five in nine years). Hawthorn, under then-coach Ken Judge, had also undertaken a youth recruitment campaign which had netted the club a number of promising players, including future Brownlow Medalist Shane Crawford.
  - In contrast, Melbourne had not won a premiership in more than three decades and suffered from a relatively weak on-field performance.
- Melbourne was in a relatively strong financial position.
  - In contrast, Hawthorn was suffering from mounting debts and financial losses. It had struggled to obtain and maintain corporate sponsorship, at one point in 1992 not having a corporate sponsor in spite of having won the previous Grand Final.
- Hawthorn had a centralised training facility, administration centre, and social club (on land owned by the social club) at its Glenferrie Oval complex. The team's training facilities had recently been upgraded and were amongst the best in the league.
  - In contrast, Melbourne did not have a central base: it trained at the Junction Oval in St Kilda, had its administration facilities in Jolimont, and had a social club in Sandringham.
- Both clubs were perceived to have had a traditionally middle-class supporter base; Melbourne had a historical connection to the Melbourne Cricket Club, while Hawthorn was based in the middle class, inner-eastern suburb of Hawthorn.
- Both clubs, in contrast to the stronger Melbourne-based clubs (like Collingwood, Carlton, or Essendon), and the stronger interstate teams (like Adelaide, or West Coast), had a relatively small membership base.

It is perhaps from a combination of these reasons that negotiations would proceed further between Melbourne and Hawthorn than between other potential merger partners.

=== Negotiations ===
The negotiations advanced considerably and settled on a number of key aspects of the proposed team. Speculation about ongoing merger negotiations often appeared in the mainstream media prior to the official announcement, with several key details leaking to the press. Key points related to the club's identity which were agreed upon during negotiations prior to the official announcement included that:

- The new team's name would be "Melbourne" and would use Hawthorn's "Hawks" nickname
- The new team's guernsey would resemble Melbourne's, except feature a gold 'V' and a gold Hawk
- The amalgamated team would use Melbourne's red and blue with Hawthorn's gold
- Hawthorn's Hawk would be the new team's logo
- New club best and fairest award to be known as the Crimmins–Truscott Trophy
- New club song combined Melbourne's theme song and Hawthorn theme song, lyrics were:

  We're the Melbourne Hawks, We're the high-flying hawks! 
  We're the mighty Melbourne Hawks! 
  We play each game, and we play to win! 
  Watch out! We play it with a grin! 
  Every heart beats true for the gold, red and blue, 
  As we sing this song for you: 
  One for all and all for one, two will make us stronger... 
  Keep your eye on the Mighty Melbourne Hawks! 

Some commentators noted that the merged team would more closely resemble Melbourne than Hawthorn and speculated whether Hawthorn suffered from a weaker bargaining position as a result of its weak financial situation.

Under the package offered by the AFL, the transitional arrangements for the merged club would be as follows:

- A $6M payout from the AFL over three years, with the only condition that paying off creditors be the first priority
- Ten home games at the Melbourne Cricket Ground each year from 1997 until 1999, then alternating between nine and ten games until 2007.
- A senior list of 44 players in 1997, reducing to 42 in 1998, before dropping to the standard 38 in 1999.
- Unrestricted access to players from both Hawthorn's and Melbourne's lists when compiling the initial playing list.
- Permission to exceed the league's salary cap (then $2.9M/yr) by $300k in 1997, $200k in 1998 and $100k in 1999.
- Free membership for children in 1997
- A $225k advanced payout to implement and promote the merger, whether it happened or not

== Don Scott and "Operation Payback" ==
In the wake of the official merger announcement, Don Scott (a former Hawthorn footballer) launched the "Operation Payback" campaign. Aided by the business acumen of former Pacific Dunlop executive Ian Dicker the campaign, which would be backed by other former Hawthorn footballers including Dermott Brereton and Brian Falconer, was multifaceted and included a number of aims:

- To launch a motion officially opposing the merger proposal, and to present the anti-merger case, at the extraordinary general meeting where Hawthorn members would vote on the merger proposal
- To run a fundraising campaign to alleviate Hawthorn's immediate debt problems
- To secure business support (including potential sponsors and bank overdrafts) for the survival of Hawthorn
- To secure the support of prominent past and present footballers for the anti-merger campaign at Hawthorn

== Joe Gutnick ==
In the weeks following Scott's launch of the Operation Payback campaign, a similar anti-merger campaign was launched for the Melbourne Football Club by former premiership player Brian Dixon, who was aided by millionaire businessman Joseph Gutnick. Gutnick, a Melbourne supporter who had accumulated his wealth (and earned the nickname "Diamond" Joe Gutnick) through investments in Western Australian mining, pledged to donate A$3 million to Melbourne if the merger vote was defeated.

=== Popular backlash to the merger proposal ===
Following the launch of Operation Payback, and Gutnick's campaign at Melbourne, a vocal backlash to the merger proposal emerged amongst the supporters at both clubs. Banners with slogans including "No Merger" and "Operation Payback" became a common fixture at both Hawthorn training sessions, Hawthorn matches, and at Glenferrie Road. Other signs appeared, including several which decried the system of 'proxy votes' for members unable to attend the anti-merger meeting (it was speculated by some of those who opposed the merger proposal that proxy votes would help the pro-merger cause). This opposition was not universal: several thousand members (as noted earlier) ended up voting in favor of the merger proposal; including a majority of Melbourne supporters. In some cases, those supporting the merger were equally as passionate as those who opposed it.

== Merger game ==
The end of the 1996 season saw Melbourne and Hawthorn play each other in the last round of that season. The "merger game", as it was called, was a spirited contest as it was a likely possibility that it would be the last Hawthorn vs Melbourne contest and, as the result that Melbourne could not make the finals and Hawthorn needed to win the game by any margin to have any chance to contest the 1996 finals series, many supporters saw this game as a last chance to see their team play football.

Team	1	2	3	Final
Hawthorn	3.5	10.6	12.10	15.12 (102)
Melbourne	5.4	7.6	12.8	15.11 (101)

A crowd of 63,196 attended the Melbourne Cricket Ground to see Jason Dunstall kick 10 goals and the Hawks win by one point. In a now-famous moment of defiance to both the league and his team's board, Chris Langford (Hawthorn's full-back), took off his Hawthorn jumper and proudly held it above his head while leaving the field. Prior to the game, an "anti-merger" rally, led by Scott, was held at Hawthorn's then training ground, Glenferrie Oval.

Later in the round, Richmond lost to North Melbourne by a large margin. This loss ensured that Hawthorn were playing in the finals. The finals system at the time meant that Hawthorn, which finished in eighth position, had to play the team which finished first, Sydney Swans, in Sydney. Hawthorn would lose by 6 points and be knocked out in the first week of the 1996 finals, a week after the merger votes.

=== Teams ===
Melbourne
B:	23 Alastair Clarkson	32 Damien Gaspar	15 Paul Hopgood
HB:	25 Luke Norman	4 Andrew Obst	17 Brett Lovett
C:	12 Todd Viney	7 Darren Kowal	38 Darren O'Brien
HF:	36 Andrew Leoncelli	9 David Neitz	18 Craig Nettelbeck
F:	11 Jim Stynes	24 Clay Sampson	13 Adem Yze
Foll:	34 Dean Irving	16 Andy Lovell	33 Jeff Farmer
Int:	37 Andrew Lamprill	21 Steven Febey	20 Matthew Febey
Coach:	Neil Balme		

Hawthorn
B:	5 Andrew Collins	24 Chris Langford	34 Mark Graham
HB:	1 Ray Jencke	14 Brendan Krummel	15 Daniel Harford
C:	9 Shane Crawford	27 Daniel Chick	11 Darren Kappler
HF:	17 Paul Hudson	2 Nick Holland	3 Anthony Condon
F:	6 Richard Taylor	19 Jason Dunstall (c)	7 Luke McCabe
Foll:	4 Paul Salmon	15 Tony Woods	44 John Platten
Int:	12 Stephen Lawrence	18 Darrin Pritchard	33 Craig Treleven
Coach:	Ken Judge		

Hawthorn's future four-time premiership coach Alastair Clarkson played for Melbourne that night, as did three of his assistant coaches: David Neitz, Todd Viney and Adem Yze.

== Vote ==
Both the Hawthorn and Melbourne Football Clubs called extraordinary general meetings – Hawthorn held their meeting at the Camberwell Civic Centre, while Melbourne held its meeting at Dallas Brooks Hall. To the surprise of the respective clubs' boards, the meeting halls were filled, with more members and supporters of each team watching proceedings on large monitors outside. Entrepreneurial peddlers set up stalls selling merchandise along the long queues into the respective meeting halls.

The Hawthorn meeting was chaired by former premiership player and lawyer Richard Loveridge. The debates about the merger were passionate. When triple premiership coach Allan Jeans got up to speak on behalf of the merger the crowd shouted him down. Anti-merger coordinator Don Scott (in a now-famous moment) at one point held up a mock-up of the Melbourne Hawks jumper, then proceeded to rip off a Velcro hawk and yellow V-neck to reveal a Melbourne jumper underneath. Prior to the commencement of the meetings, vocal anti-merger supporters chanted team songs and anti-merger slogans.

While Melbourne members (aided by a large bloc of proxy votes and the inability of all interested parties to get inside the hall to vote) voted 4,679 to 4,229 in favour of the merger, Hawthorn members overwhelming voted against it by a vote of 5,241 to 2,841 and the proposal was defeated. Large-scale resignations followed on both boards as those who had supported the merger fell on their swords; several prominent members of the anti-merger campaigns (including Dicker, Scott, Brereton, and Gutnick) would take senior executive or board positions at both clubs in the wake of the merger. The two sides continue to play in their original form to this day.

== Aftermath ==
Before the failed merger of Melbourne and Hawthorn, on 4 July 1996, the Fitzroy and Brisbane clubs had been merged by the directive of the AFL commission to take effect as the Brisbane Lions on 1 November 1996. Footscray and North Melbourne also changed their names to the Western Bulldogs and the Kangaroos respectively to attract more fans, having both been considered for mergers in the last two decades.

Shortly after the season and the collapse of the Melbourne-Hawthorn merger, AFL CEO Ross Oakley, who had overseen the previous decade, stepped down and was replaced by Wayne Jackson. With the new CEO came a change in the league's off-field direction, and in October 1996 the $6M incentive for Victorian clubs to merge was taken off the table. A new structure, which included stronger and earlier action against insolvent clubs, as well as restrictions on private ownership, was put forward. Nevertheless, decades later, merger and relocation talks among weaker Victorian clubs continue.

=== Melbourne ===
In the months following the 1996 merger vote, prominent businessman Joseph Gutnick became president of the Melbourne Football Club.

In 2003, Melbourne plunged into a new crisis, winning only five games for the year and posting a $1 million loss. President Gabriel Szondy resigned and it seemed that Daniher's tenure as coach was under threat. But, continuing the recent trend, in 2004, Melbourne climbed the ladder again, to finish seventh. They made finals again in 2005 and 2006, but 2007 was a poor season for Melbourne; Daniher resigned after the club recorded just two wins in its first thirteen games, and Melbourne finished 14th out of 16 clubs.

Off the field, the club remained in serious turmoil. In the first sign of troubles in February 2008, CEO Steve Harris resigned. Paul Gardner addressed the media in response to comments from the club's auditors spelling disaster for the club. Gardner reiterated that the club had posted a $97,000 profit at the end of 2007. Despite celebrating the club's birthday with an official mid-season function, shortly afterward chairman Paul Gardner resigned, handing the presidency to former club champion Jim Stynes, who inherited a $4.5 million debt.

Stynes wasted no time attempting to change the club's direction and eliminate debt, introducing a drive called "Debt Demolition", beginning with a call for members to sign up. A 5 August fundraiser raised $1.3 million, and the club raised well over $3 million in total. Despite the reduced debt, in November new club CEO Cameron Schwab declared that it required urgent AFL assistance to continue, requesting additional funding to its special annual distribution. The AFL committed $1 million to the club in 2009, with the MCC matching the AFL contribution. By the midpoint of the 2009 season, things had improved off field for Melbourne. They had secured a record number of members, remerged with the MCC, and knocked off more debt. On-field matters, however, worsened, and allegations of tanking in the latter part of the season tarnished the club.

Midway through the 2010 season, Melbourne chairman Jim Stynes announced that Melbourne had paid off all debts, which, along with a record club membership, secured Melbourne's short-term future as a stand-alone club.

In 2021, Melbourne reached the Grand Final for the second time since the failed merger, where they ended their 57-year premiership drought with a defeat of the Western Bulldogs.

=== Hawthorn ===
Hawthorn has managed to grow in strength on and off the field since the merger. Membership jumped from 12,484 to 27,000 in 1997 and has continued to increase every year. One of the proposed advantages of merging was playing on the MCG, and Hawthorn moved its home games there in 2000 after the AFL closed Waverley Park.

The Hawks moved from their home base at Glenferrie. They relocated to the old Waverley Park, which was being carved into lucrative real estate by Mirvac. Under the terms of the deal, the oval and immediate surrounds were to remain for sporting purposes. Mirvac needed a club to occupy the oval. Hawthorn paid $1 and, in return, received the freehold on the entire oval and a portion of what is now the administrative buildings.

The club began playing a few home games each year in Launceston in 2001, predominantly against the non-Victorian clubs, which earns it a hefty sponsorship from the Tasmanian government. In 2015, Hawthorn signed a five-year, $19 million deal with the Tasmanian State Government to continue to play four home and away games and a pre-season game in Launceston until the end of 2021; this agreement was later extended an additional year through 2022. The club now boasts one of the highest memberships among Victorian clubs, and was a dominant club on-field in the early 21st century with four premierships between 2008 and 2015.
