= Chris Barrett =

Chris Barrett may refer to:

- Chris Barrett (filmmaker) (born 1982), American Internet entrepreneur, film director, spokesperson, and author
- Chris Barrett (Australian footballer) (born 1973), Australian footballer
- Chris Barrett (Gaelic footballer) (born 1987), Irish Gaelic footballer
