= Simon Dennis (footballer) =

Australian rules footballer

Personal information
- Full name: Simon Dennis
- Born: 21 February 1973 (age 53)
- Original teams: Syndal Tally Ho, (VAFA)
- Draft: No. 44, 1992 Pre-season Draft

Playing career^{1}
Years	Club	Games (Goals)
1993	Richmond	2 (0)
- ^{1} Playing statistics correct to the end of 1993.

Simon Dennis (born 21 February 1973) is a former Australian rules footballer who played for Richmond in the Australian Football League (AFL) in 1993. He was recruited from Syndal Tally Ho in the Victorian Amateur Football Association (VAFA) with the 44th selection in the 1992 Pre-season Draft.
