= Garry Phillips =

Australian rules footballer

Personal information
- Full name: Garry Phillips
- Born: 20 July 1968 (age 58)
- Original teams: Old Haileyburians, (VAFA)
- Draft: No. 48, 1989 pre-season draft No. 26, 1992 AFL Pre-season Draft

Playing career^{1}
Years	Club	Games (Goals)
1990	Geelong	3 (0)
- ^{1} Playing statistics correct to the end of 1992.

Garry Phillips (born 20 July 1968) is a former Australian rules footballer who played for Geelong in the Australian Football League (AFL) in 1990. He was recruited from the Old Haileyburians Football Club in the (Victorian Amateur Football Association (VAFA) with the 48th selection in the 1989 VFL Pre-season Draft. He was delisted and redrafted again by Geelong with the 26th selection in the 1992 AFL Pre-season Draft. He is the son of Ken Phillips who played for South Melbourne in the 1960s.
