= Sam Jones (Australian footballer) =

Australian rules footballer

Personal information
- Full name: Sam Jones
- Born: 3 May 1974 (age 52)
- Original team: Sandy Bay (TFL)
- Draft: No. 86, 1990 AFL draft No. 87, 1991 AFL draft

Playing career^{1}
Years	Club	Games (Goals)
1994	St Kilda	3 (3)
- ^{1} Playing statistics correct to the end of 1994.

Sam Jones (born 3 May 1974) is a former Australian rules footballer who played for St Kilda in the Australian Football League (AFL) in 1994. He was drafted twice by St Kilda from the Sandy Bay Football Club in the Tasmanian Football League (TFL), with the 86th selection in the 1990 AFL draft and the 87th selection in the 1991 AFL draft.

Jones eventually made his senior AFL debut in 1994, playing three games for St Kilda before his delisting by the club at the end of the season. Jones then transferred to South Australian National Football League (SANFL) club West Adelaide.
