= Lalor Football Club =

Names
- Full name: Lalor Football Club
- Nickname(s): The Bloods

2019 season
- After finals: 7th of 8
- Leading goalkicker: Sam Rexhepi 25 goals 12 games (2021).

Club details
- Founded: 1955
- Colours: Red White Navy Blue
- Competition: Northern Football Netball League
- Chairperson: -
- Coach: -
- Ground(s): Lalor Recreation Reserve

Other information
- Official website: www.bloodsfnc.com.au

Lalor Football Club is an Australian rules football club located 18 km north of Melbourne in the suburb of Lalor, Victoria which has a population of 19,561 c. 2006. The club fields a Senior and a Reserves team and for the 2019 Season fielded a combined U 19's team with North Heidelberg known as Bulldog Bloods and affiliated with the Northern Football Netball League.

Lalor first fielded a senior team in the Panton Hill Football League in 1964. After winning premierships in 1966 and 1967 the club transferred to the Diamond Valley Football League in 1968.

For many years the Kernaghan family were heavily involved in the club, Mrs K was there every week selling raffle tickets while over the years her 7 boys played. She remained active in the club up until her death in 1994.

== Timeline of the Lalor Football Club ==
- 1964–1967 Panton Hill Football League
- 1968–1980 Diamond Valley Football League
- 1981–2000 Diamond Valley Football League Division One
- 2001 Diamond Valley Football League Division Two
- 2002 Diamond Valley Football League Division One
- 2003–2004 Diamond Valley Football League Division Two
- 2005–2006 Diamond Valley Football League Division One
- 2007 Northern Football League Division Two
- 2008–2010 Northern Football League Division One
- 2011–2017 Northern Football League Division Two
- 2018-2019 Northern Football League Division Three
- 2020 Northern Football League Division Three (Season cancelled due to COVID-19)
- 2021 Northern Football League Division Three (12 Match Season due to COVID-19)
- 2022 Northern Football League Division Three

== Senior Premierships (10) ==
- Panton Hill Football League (2):

1966, 1967

- Northern Football League (Diamond Valley Football League) (8):
- Division 1

1980, 1991, 1992, 1993, 1998.

- Division 2

2001, 2004, 2007.

== Runners up (6) ==
Division 1

1982, 1984, 1989, 1994.

Division 2

2003, 2015.

== See also ==
- Athas Hrysoulakis, part of the 1998 premiership team.
