= Jeremy Smith (Australian footballer) =

Australian rules footballer (born 1973)

Personal information
- Born: 31 October 1973 (age 53)
- Original team: Sandy Bay
- Draft: 54th overall, 1992 pre-season draft
- Height: 182 cm (6 ft 0 in)
- Weight: 89 kg (196 lb)
- Position: Forward flank

Playing career^{1}
Years	Club	Games (Goals)
1992–1994	Carlton	1 (1)
- ^{1} Playing statistics correct to the end of 1994.

Jeremy Smith (born 31 October 1973) is a former Australian rules footballer who played with Carlton in the Australian Football League (AFL).
