= Phillip Murton =

Australian rules footballer

Personal information
- Full name: Phillip Murton
- Born: 29 September 1973 (age 53)
- Original team: Surrey Hills
- Height: 185 cm (6 ft 1 in)
- Weight: 78 kg (172 lb)

Playing career^{1}
| Years | Club | Games (Goals) |
| 1992–1994 | Hawthorn | 7 (2) |
- ^{1} Playing statistics correct to the end of 1994.

Phillip "Phil" Murton (born 29 September 1973) is a former Australian rules footballer who played with Hawthorn in the Australian Football League (AFL).

A winger from Surrey Hills, Murton won the Hawthorn reserves best and fairest award in 1992 and also made four senior appearances that year. In a pre-season practice match against Essendon in 1993, Murton broke his left leg and spent the entire season on the sidelines. He played in the opening three rounds of the 1994 AFL season but they were his final appearances for Hawthorn.

For the rest of his playing career, Murton spent time at South Adelaide, De La Salle College (where he was Director of Sport) and Noble Park.

He is now the CEO of the Eastern Football League.
