= Paul McCormack =

Australian rules footballer

Personal information
- Full name: Paul McCormack
- Born: 12 March 1970 (age 56)
- Original team: Scoresby/North Melbourne U19s/Dandenong
- Draft: 19th overall, 1992 Pre-season draft
- Height: 183 cm (6 ft 0 in)
- Weight: 83 kg (183 lb)
- Position: Half back flank

Playing career^{1}
Years	Club	Games (Goals)
1992–1994	Carlton	14 (2)
- ^{1} Playing statistics correct to the end of 1994.

Career highlights
- Fos Williams Medal, 1998

Paul McCormack (born 12 March 1970) is a former Australian rules footballer who played with Carlton in the Australian Football League (AFL) and Norwood Football Club in the South Australian National Football League (SANFL).

Originally from Scoresby, McCormack played with North Melbourne's strong under 19 side before transferring to Victorian Football Association (VFA) club Dandenong. After impressing in the VFA, McCormack was drafted by Carlton at number 19 in the 1992 Pre-season draft.

McCormack made his senior debut for Carlton in 1992 but was unable to cement a spot in the senior team, playing only fourteen matches in three seasons. McCormack was subsequently delisted by Carlton at the end of the 1994 AFL season and transferred to Norwood Football Club in the South Australian National Football League (SANFL).

In 1998 McCormack won the Fos Williams Medal, representing the SANFL against the West Australian Football League. He moved back to Victoria in 2006 and began coaching East Ringwood in the Eastern Football League. After coaching East Ringwood for four seasons, McCormack moved to become coach of Old Brighton Grammarians in the Victorian Amateur Football Association (VAFA). After a successful first season, McCormack re-signed with Old Brighton to coach them again in 2011 before accepting a role as an assistant coach with the Oakleigh Chargers in the TAC Cup for the 2012 season.

Following his successful stint at Oakleigh Chargers, McCormack went on to coach Bayswater Football Club to the 2016 premiership in the Eastern Football league. He was an assistant coach with the Sandringham Dragons in the Victorian Under 18 TAC Cup competition. McCormack was sacked from Edithvale-Aspendale Sporting Club at the conclusion of 2023 after two seasons as their senior coach.
