= Michael Ford (Australian footballer) =

Australian rules footballer (born 1962)

Personal information
- Full name: Michael Ford
- Born: 11 October 1962 (age 64)
- Original team: Bairnsdale (GFL)
- Height: 183 cm (6 ft 0 in)
- Weight: 85 kg (187 lb)

Playing career^{1}
Years	Club	Games (Goals)
1985–1991	Footscray	96 (19)
1992	St Kilda	2 (0)
Total		98 (19)
- ^{1} Playing statistics correct to the end of 1992.

Michael Ford (born 11 October 1962) is a former Australian rules footballer who played with Footscray and St Kilda in the Victorian/Australian Football League (VFL/AFL).

Ford, a defender from Gippsland Football League club Bairnsdale, was already 22 when he made his VFL debut in 1985. He played finals in his first year and appeared in a further six seasons for Footscray before his delisting at the end of the 1991 AFL season. St Kilda secured Ford's services in the 1992 Pre-season Draft, with pick 10, but he would only play two senior games for his new club.

Ford spent the next stage of his career at Victorian Football Association (VFA) club Sandringham and was a member of their 1992 premiership side.

In 1994 he coached Oakleigh, in what would be their final season in the VFA. A knee injury forced him to retire as a player.

Ford coached fellow VFA club Springvale to a premiership in 1995, when they defeated his former club Sandringham in the grand final. Despite this he was sacked as coach and replaced by Brad Gotch.

Ford was appointed coach of North Shore Australian Football Club for 2020.
