= Shane Burgmann =

Australian rules footballer

Personal information
- Full name: Shane Burgmann
- Born: 7 January 1974 (age 52)
- Original teams: Berwick, (MPNFL)
- Height: 192 cm (6 ft 4 in)
- Weight: 94 kg (207 lb)

Playing career^{1}
Years	Club	Games (Goals)
1991–1993	Melbourne	1 (0)
- ^{1} Playing statistics correct to the end of 1993.

Shane Burgmann (born 7 January 1974) is a former Australian rules footballer who played for Melbourne in the Australian Football League (AFL) in 1992. He was recruited from the Berwick Football Club in the Mornington Peninsula Nepean Football League (MPNFL). He is the son of Lloyd Burgmann, who played for Melbourne in the 1970s.

After being delisted by Melbourne Burgmann played reserves for Hawthorn in 1994.

Burgmann then transferred to Springvale in the Victorian Football Association (VFA) in 1995, winning premierships in 1995 and 1996, before moving to fellow VFL/VFA club Frankston.
