= Paul Morrish =

Australian rules footballer (born 1968)

Personal information
- Born: 12 May 1968 (age 58)
- Original team: Ouyen Rovers
- Debut: Round 22, 1986, Richmond vs. Geelong, at the M.C.G.
- Height: 188 cm (6 ft 2 in)
- Weight: 79 kg (174 lb)

Playing career^{1}
Years	Club	Games (Goals)
1986–1989	Richmond	4 (0)
1990–1991	Essendon	7 (0)
1992–1993	Fitzroy	20 (1)
Total		31 (1)
- ^{1} Playing statistics correct to the end of 1993.

Paul Morrish is an Australian rules footballer who played for Richmond, Essendon and Fitzroy. He made his debut with Richmond against Geelong in round 22 of 1986 season and played three more games for Richmond in 1989. Morrish was drafted by Essendon in 1990 Midyear draft and played 7 games in the 1991 season. In the 1991 AFL draft he was picked up by Fitzroy and played 20 games for them in 1992 and 1993.
