= Frank Lesiputty =

Australian rules footballer

Personal information
- Full name: Frank Lesiputty
- Born: 26 August 1967 (age 59)
- Original team: Werribee (VFA)
- Height: 185 cm (6 ft 1 in)
- Weight: 83 kg (183 lb)

Playing career^{1}
Years	Club	Games (Goals)
1987	Footscray	2 (1)
- ^{1} Playing statistics correct to the end of 1987.

Frank Lesiputty (born 26 August 1967) is a former Australian rules footballer who played with Footscray in the Victorian Football League (VFL).

Recruited from Victorian Football Association (VFA) club Werribee during the 1987 VFL season, Lesiputty made his senior debut in Round 15, against Sydney, and his second match in Round 17, against Hawthorn.

Lesiputty transferred to West Adelaide in the South Australian National Football League (SANFL) for the 1988 season before returning to Werribee in 1990.
