= Paul Tuddenham =

Australian rules footballer

Personal information
- Born: 14 September 1967 (age 59)
- Original team: Xavier College
- Height: 184 cm (6 ft 0 in)
- Weight: 84 kg (185 lb)

Playing career^{1}
Years	Club	Games (Goals)
1987–1991	Collingwood	40 (32)
1992	Carlton	0 (0)
- ^{1} Playing statistics correct to the end of 1991.

Paul Tuddenham (born 14 September 1967) is a former Australian rules footballer who played with Collingwood in the Victorian/Australian Football League (VFL/AFL).

== Family ==
Tuddenham's father Des was a Collingwood captain and is the ruck-rover in their Team of the Century.

== VFL/AFL career ==
An Xavier College recruit, Tuddenham first broke into the Collingwood seniors late in the 1987 season and played nine games in 1988, including a qualifying final. In 1989 he made 10 appearances, but his season ended in round 14 when he tore a hamstring against Footscray. The following year Tuddenham played 10 games in the home and away season, but missed the finals series, which concluded with Collingwood ending their premiership drought. Early in the season he had kicked four goals in successive weeks, against Sydney and Footscray. He played nine senior games in 1991 and ended the year badly by rupturing his ACL while training with the reserves. Carlton picked him up in the 1992 Pre-season Draft and he appeared in 13 reserves games for them in 1992.

== Later career ==
After playing for Prahran in the Victorian Football Association, Tuddenham returned to Xavier College and was a member of the 1995 Old Xaverians VAFA premiership team.
