= Athas Hrysoulakis =

Australian rules footballer

Personal information
- Full name: Athas Hrysoulakis
- Born: 5 January 1969 (age 57)
- Original team: Lalor (DVFL)
- Height: 184 cm (6 ft 0 in)
- Weight: 83 kg (183 lb)
- Position: Forward

Playing career^{1}
Years	Club	Games (Goals)
1987–1990	Collingwood	19 (15)
- ^{1} Playing statistics correct to the end of 1990.

Athas Hrysoulakis (born 5 January 1969) is a former Australian rules footballer who played with Collingwood in the Victorian/Australian Football League (VFL/AFL).

Hrysoulakis, a Lalor recruit, played his first league season in 1987, when he put together nine games. He did not play senior VFL football in 1988 but the following year played the best football of his career late in the season. Playing as a forward, Hrysoulakis kicked five goals against the Sydney Swans at Victoria Park in round 18 and after some more good games kept his spot in the side for the elimination final. Collingwood lost the final to Melbourne, but Hrysoulakis was solid with 22 disposals and a goal.

Having been able to play only two more games in 1990, a premiership year for Collingwood, Hrysoulakis joined Victorian Football Association club Prahran. He returned to the AFL in 1991 when he was selected by Richmond with the fifth pick of the Mid-season Draft, but would be unable to add to his games tally. He didn't play a senior AFL game for the Swans.

He later topped the goal-kicking in the Diamond Valley Football League, in 1998, when he helped Lalor to a premiership.
