= Marcus Seecamp =

Australian rules footballer

Personal information
- Full name: Marcus Seecamp
- Born: 27 July 1972 (age 54)
- Original team: East Perth
- Draft: 2nd overall, 1991, Fitzroy
- Height: 185 cm (6 ft 1 in)
- Weight: 87 kg (192 lb)
- Position: Defender

Playing career^{1}
Years	Club	Games (Goals)
1989–1991	East Perth	33 (19)
1992–1994	Fitzroy	51 (10)
1995–2000	Melbourne	89 (8)
Total		173 (37)
- ^{1} Playing statistics correct to the end of 2000.

Marcus Seecamp (born 27 July 1972) is a former Australian rules footballer who played with Fitzroy and Melbourne in the Australian Football League (AFL) during the 1990s.

Seecamp was a defender, used mostly across half back. Fitzroy picked him up from Western Australian Football League team East Perth with the second pick of the 1991 AFL draft, behind John Hutton. Seecamp spent three years at Fitzroy before they traded him to Melbourne at the end of the 1994 AFL season, gaining Martin Pike as a result.

Over the course of his career, Seecamp was chosen in the Western Australian State of Origin team on three occasions. His 100th AFL appearance, in 1997, proved to be memorable for the wrong reasons, with Mark Bayes and Tony Lockett kicking six goals each to help Sydney defeat Melbourne by 116 points at the MCG. The following season he took part in his only finals campaign, culminating in a Preliminary Final loss to North Melbourne Football Club. The club would eventually make a 2000 AFL Grand Final in 2000, but Seecamp missed out on selection, having been out of action since round six with a hamstring injury, which ended his league career. He later played at Ainslie in the ACTAFL and has taken part in E. J. Whitten Legends Games.
