= Alan Thorpe (footballer) =

Australian rules footballer and media commentator

Personal information
- Full name: Alan Thorpe
- Born: 18 October 1968 (age 58)
- Original team: Tatura
- Draft: No. 28, 1991 Mid-Season Draft, Fitzroy
- Height: 185 cm (6 ft 1 in)
- Weight: 83 kg (183 lb)
- Position: Forward

Playing career^{1}
Years	Club	Games (Goals)
1992	Sydney	3 (5)
1993–94	Footscray	12 (23)
- ^{1} Playing statistics correct to the end of 1994.

Alan Thorpe (born 18 October 1968) is an Australian rules footballer and a media commentator. He played for Sydney Swans and Footscray in the Australian Football League (AFL) and is a panel member on The Marngrook Footy Show.

== Football ==
A former under 19s player for Fitzroy, Thorpe was first on the main Fitzroy player list after being picked in the 1991 Mid-Season Draft. While with Fitzroy, he played 32 under 19s and 11 reserves games, but did not make the senior team. He was delisted and went to Tatura in the Goulburn Valley Football League. Thorpe was then selected by Sydney Swans in the 1992 Pre-season Draft and made his senior debut in round 7 against Melbourne. Thorpe played a total of three games in 1992 before returning to Tatura. At the end of that season he went to Oakleigh in the Victorian Football Association (VFA). He played two games with the Footscray reserves team in 1993, and was selected by Footscray in the 1993 Mid-Season Draft. Thorpe played four games for Footscray late in 1993 and eight more games with them in 1994. He played his final game in round 10, 1994 and was delisted at the end of the season. In the 1995 Pre-Season Draft he was picked by Carlton. He played in the pre-season cup, but never played a senior game with them and was delisted at the end of the season.

== Media ==
Thorpe is a founding member of The Marngrook Footy Show, which started in the 1990s as a radio show on 3KND and the National Indigenous Radio Service network. In 2007 it moved to a TV show on National Indigenous Television (NITV) and Melbourne's Channel 31, and moved to ABC2 in 2011.
