= Darren Kowal =

Australian rules footballer

Personal information
- Full name: Darren John Kowal
- Born: 18 June 1972 (age 54)
- Original team: South Bunbury
- Draft: 3rd, 1991 AFL draft
- Height: 173 cm (5 ft 8 in)
- Weight: 74 kg (163 lb)

Playing career^{1}
Years	Club	Games (Goals)
1991	Claremont	16 (16)
1992–1999	Melbourne	105 (46)
2000–2005	Claremont	89 (75)
- ^{1} Playing statistics correct to the end of 2005.

Career highlights
- AFL Rising Star nominee: 1993

Darren Kowal (born 18 June 1972) is a former Australian rules footballer who played with Melbourne in the Australian Football League (AFL) during the 1990s.

A member of Claremont's 1991 West Australian Football League premiership team, Kowal was selected by Melbourne with the third pick of the 1991 AFL draft, behind fellow Western Australian players John Hutton and Marcus Seecamp. He made his AFL debut late in the 1992 season and was a regular fixture in the Melbourne midfield in 1993. Kowal earned a 1993 AFL Rising Star nomination for his 21 disposals and two goals against St Kilda. He also kicked 21 goals for the season.

Kowal however spent much of his career at Melbourne as a defender and until 1997 was selected regularly in the seniors. His 1996 season, in which he played all 22 games, is remembered for a physical confrontation he had with a Richmond runner and their coach Robert Walls during a match. Both Kowal and Walls were fined after the incident.

After spending much of 1998 in the reserves he broke into the senior side and played some of his best football late in the season. He took part in Melbourne's finals campaign that year and celebrated his 100th game with a win over Adelaide at the MCG in 1999, his last season.

From 2000 to 2005, Kowal played once more for Claremont and spent a period of time as club captain.
