= Glenn Page =

Australian rules footballer

Personal information
- Full name: Glenn Page
- Born: 24 March 1970 (age 56)
- Original team: Collingullie
- Height: 183 cm (6 ft 0 in)
- Weight: 83 kg (183 lb)

Playing career^{1}
Years	Club	Games (Goals)
1989–1991	Sydney Swans	18 (3)
1992	North Melbourne	5 (0)
Total		23 (3)
- ^{1} Playing statistics correct to the end of 1992.

Glenn Page (born 24 March 1970) is a former Australian rules footballer who played with the Sydney Swans and North Melbourne in the Victorian/Australian Football League (VFL/AFL).

Page was recruited from Collingullie, in New South Wales, and made 18 appearances for the Sydney Swans, 10 of them in 1990. He then made his way to North Melbourne via the 1992 Pre-season Draft and played five league games in the 1992 season.
