= Peter Burke (Australian footballer) =

Australian rules footballer

Personal information
- Full name: Peter Burke
- Born: 24 May 1964 (age 62)
- Original team: Koonung / East Kew
- Height: 187 cm (6 ft 2 in)
- Weight: 84 kg (185 lb)

Playing career^{1}
Years	Club	Games (Goals)
1984–1985	Fitzroy	26 (2)
1987	Richmond	2 (0)
Total		28 (2)
- ^{1} Playing statistics correct to the end of 1985.

Peter Burke (born 24 May 1964) is a former Australian rules footballer who represented the Fitzroy Football Club and the Richmond Football Club in the Victorian Football League (VFL) during the 1980s. Burke played in Fitzroy's 1982 Under 19's premiership side, one of the last premierships in any form won by the club before making his debut in 1984. After two years with the Lions, and a season out of the game, Burke made the move to Richmond for the 1987 season, where he added two games to his league total before leaving the VFL.
