= Geoff Miles =

Australian rules footballer and coach

Personal information
- Full name: Geoffrey Charles Miles
- Born: 10 January 1962 (age 64)
- Original team: Ivanhoe Amateurs
- Height: 185 cm (6 ft 1 in)
- Weight: 85 kg (13 st 5 lb)
- Position: Half back flanker

Playing career^{1}
Years	Club	Games (Goals)
1982–1984	Collingwood	31 (7)
1985–1991	Claremont	73 (89)
1987–1990	West Coast	71 (33)
1992	Geelong	20 (25)
Total		195 (155)
- ^{1} Playing statistics correct to the end of 1992.

Geoffrey Charles Miles (born 10 January 1962) is a former Australian rules footballer who played for Collingwood, West Coast and Geelong in the Australian Football League (AFL), formerly VFL. Miles was primarily a hard running wingman or half back but could also play up forward, which he did later in his career.

Recruited from Ivanhoe Amateurs in the Victorian Amateur Football Association, Miles spent three seasons at Collingwood, in which he played 31 of a possible 68 senior matches over three seasons. By the middle of 1984, Miles had been told he was unlikely to regain a senior berth, but that he was not sacked.

He moved to Western Australia in 1985 after being recruited by Claremont, for whom he played a total of 73 senior matches over the next seven seasons. He was part of the inaugural West Coast list and debuted in their inaugural VFL game at the start of the 1987 season. Miles was a regular with the Eagles for three seasons, during which he played mostly in defence but also showed his ability in attack, such as when he kicked five goals from eight kicks in a 76-point win over Carlton during 1989.

However, 1990 saw Miles struggling to get a game as a champion defence led by Guy McKenna and John Worsfold emerged. Consequently, Miles returned permanently to Claremont and played in their 1990 grand final loss to Swan Districts. The following season Miles did not play in the AFL but was a member of the Tigers' 1991 premiership team, by which time he had been moved permanently into attack and formed a deadly combination with future Brisbane, Sydney and Fremantle full-forward John Hutton. He would have played for the WAFL against the SANFL but for an appointment in Victoria.

A four-time Western Australian interstate representative, he was traded to Geelong in the 1991 AFL draft, thus missing out on West Coast's premierships in 1992 and 1994. However, he did play in the 1992 AFL Grand Final, in which Geelong lost to his former club West Coast. After spending much of the first half of 1992 back in defence and then six rounds in the reserves, Miles returned to attack and, after promotion to the Cats' senior team, kicked seven goals in a game against Melbourne and followed it up with five goals in each of the next two rounds.

The following year, 1993, Miles won a premiership with local Bellarine Football League side, Barwon Heads, before becoming president of the club until 2006. Miles was the foundation coach of controversial ninth Westar Rules club Peel Thunder in 1997. The Thunder suffered a string of dreadful thrashings in 1997 and won only one game by three points, but Miles set a target of six wins for 1998. (Note: In their first eighteen Westar Rules/WAFL seasons, Peel won six or more games only in 2001, 2002, 2006 and 2008.) After the Thunder remained winless nine games into the season, however, Miles abruptly resigned, saying that he had given up trying to improve the club.

Miles's son, Teia, was drafted to Hawthorn with pick 49 in the 2014 AFL draft. His daughter is married to Geelong footballer Mitch Duncan.
