= Jeremy Guard =

Australian rules footballer

Personal information
- Full name: Jeremy Guard
- Born: 11 July 1970 (age 56)
- Original team: Claremont
- Draft: 7th overall, 1991 AFL draft
- Height: 180 cm (5 ft 11 in)
- Weight: 77 kg (170 lb)

Playing career^{1}
Years	Club	Games (Goals)
1992–95	Fitzroy	68 (17)
- ^{1} Playing statistics correct to the end of 1995.

Jeremy Guard (born 11 July 1970) is a former Australian rules footballer who played for Fitzroy in the Australian Football League (AFL) during the 1990s.

== Career ==
Guard was one of six Claremont players selected in the first seven picks of the 1991 AFL draft. He didn't miss a game in any of his first two seasons, playing all 42 home and away fixtures. In just his ninth appearance, against Collingwood at Princes Park, he kicked three goals and in the dying seconds delivered the ball into the forward 50 to allow Paul Roos to snap the winning goal.

He returned to Claremont in 1996 and captained them to the West Australian Football League premiership that year, with a two-point win over East Perth in the Grand Final.

He currently coaches at the Heidelberg Junior Football Club.
