= Craig O'Brien =

Australian rules footballer

Personal information
- Full name: Craig O'Brien
- Born: 3 March 1970 (age 56)
- Original team: Rye
- Height: 174 cm (5 ft 9 in)
- Weight: 89 kg (196 lb)

Playing career^{1}
Years	Club	Games (Goals)
1989–1991	Essendon	21 (16)
1992–1995	St Kilda	52 (116)
1996–2000	Sydney Swans	41 (59)
Total		114 (191)
- ^{1} Playing statistics correct to the end of 2000.

Craig O'Brien (born 3 March 1970) is a former Australian rules footballer who is most notable for his stint with the Essendon Football Club, St Kilda Football Club and finishing his career at the Sydney Swans in the Australian Football League.

O'Brien was a dangerous small forward (Height: 174 cm; Playing Weight: 89 kg) from Rye in Victoria. His style can be compared to current Swan Ryan O'Keefe, and he was a tough uncompromising in and under player.

In 1991, he was traded by Essendon to St Kilda. At the end of 1995, he was traded to the Swans. After several years at the Swans, O'Brien retired in 2000.

== Coaching career ==
After his AFL career, O'Brien turned to coaching, where he took up a position with the Broadbeach Australian Football Club in Queensland and in 2001 coached St George Football Club in the AFL Sydney competition.

His most successful coaching stint was at Palm Beach-Currumbin from 2007 to 2011, where he won premierships in 2005 and 2007, and was runner-up in 2008.

O'Brien returned to Broadbeach in 2020 and coached them to the Premiership in 2021
