= Willie Dick (footballer) =

Australian rules footballer

Personal information
- Full name: William Patrick Dick
- Born: 16 March 1966 (age 60); Goomalling
- Debut: Essendon vs. St Kilda, at Waverley Park
- Height: 179 cm (5 ft 10 in)
- Weight: 82 kg (181 lb)

Playing career^{1}
Years	Club	Games (Goals)
1985–91, 1993, 1999–2000	Perth (WAFL)	154 (136)
1992	Essendon	7 (6)
- ^{1} Playing statistics correct to the end of 1992.

William Patrick Dick is an Australian rules footballer who played for Perth in the West Australian Football League and Essendon in the Australian Football League.

Originally from Goomalling in the Wheatbelt region, Dick played in 156 games for Perth between 1985 and 2000. In 2012 he was named as one of the Top 25 WAFL players from the past 25 years.

He was drafted by Essendon in the second round of the 1991 AFL draft. He made his début against St Kilda in round 1 of 1992 season. He played seven games for the senior team and was a member of Essendons reserves premiership team. He left the club at the end of the season for family reasons.

His nephew Brad Dick played for Collingwood between 2007 and 2011. He was later drafted by West Coast on their rookie list, but did not play any senior games for them.
