= Adam Saliba =

Australian rules footballer

Personal information
- Full name: Adam Saliba
- Born: 14 July 1972 (age 54)
- Original team: North Adelaide (SANFL)
- Height: 176 cm (5 ft 9 in)
- Weight: 91 kg (201 lb)

Playing career^{1}
Years	Club	Games (Goals)
1992	Adelaide	3 (2)
- ^{1} Playing statistics correct to the end of 1992.

Adam Saliba (born 14 July 1972) is a former Australian rules footballer who played with Adelaide in the Australian Football League (AFL).

Saliba, a player sporting a Mullet hairstyle, was recruited from South Australian National Football League (SANFL) club North Adelaide as one of the 52 players on Adelaide's list for their inaugural season in 1991. He didn't play an AFL game that year and had to wait until late in the 1992 season for his AFL debut. On debut, in a win over the Sydney Swans at Football Park, Saliba had 26 disposals. He played in the next 2 games for Adelaide and retired from the AFL at the end of the season.
