= Stuart Wigney =

Australian rules footballer

Personal information
- Full name: Stuart Wigney
- Born: 19 April 1969 (age 57)
- Original team: Leongatha
- Draft: No. 20, 1987 national draft
- Height: 191 cm (6 ft 3 in)
- Weight: 99 kg (218 lb)

Playing career^{1}
Years	Club	Games (Goals)
1988–1991	Footscray	47 (21)
1992	Sydney	1 (0)
1993–1994	Adelaide	10 (20)
1995–1996	Richmond	14 (1)
Total		72 (42)
- ^{1} Playing statistics correct to the end of 1996.

Stuart Wigney (born 19 April 1969) is a former Australian rules footballer who played with Footscray, Sydney, Adelaide and Richmond in the Victorian/Australian Football League (VFL/AFL).

Wigney spent his first four seasons at Footscray, having been recruited from Leongatha. He had perhaps his best season in 1990 when he had 284 disposals, 132 marks and kicked 18 goals. It was the same year that he represented Victoria at State of Origin level, against Tasmania.

A key position player, he was traded to Sydney at the end of the 1991 AFL season but made just one appearance for his new club due to an ankle injury.

He was then traded to Adelaide for the 71st pick of the draft, which Sydney used on Mathew Aston.

After making his Adelaide debut late in the 1993 season, Wigney played a role in their run to the preliminary final, with three goals in their elimination final win over Hawthorn.

His fourth and final club was Richmond, which he joined in 1995 after being de-listed by Adelaide and being picked up with the ninth selection of the pre-season draft. Wigney played three finals for Richmond in 1995.

He has a brother, Brad, who represented South Australia in first-class cricket.
