= Andrew Macnish =

Personal information
- Full name: Andrew Geoffrey Macnish
- Born: 11 September 1965 (age 61); Perth, Western Australia
- Original team: Wembley Downs
- Debut: Round 1, 1987, West Coast vs. Richmond, at Subiaco Oval
- Height: 180 cm (5 ft 11 in)
- Weight: 73 kg (161 lb)
- Position: forward flank

Playing career^{1}
Years	Club	Games (Goals)
1985–1996	Subiaco	195 (345)
1987–1989	West Coast	20 (29)
1992	Geelong	3 (7)
Total		218 (381)
- ^{1} Playing statistics correct to the end of 1992.

Career highlights
- All-Australian team 1986; Subiaco premiership side 1986; Subiaco club champion 1991; State of Origin representative for Western Australia

Andrew Geoffrey Macnish (born 11 September 1965) is a former Australian rules footballer who played with the West Coast Eagles and Geelong in the VFL/AFL.

== Football career ==
Macnish was a Western Australian and his early football was played with Subiaco. He represented WA in the 1986 State of Origin Carnival. He gained All-Australian team selection whilst still 20 years old making him one of the youngest in the carnival era (1953–88) from WA.

Macnish was then recruited by West Coast for their inaugural season in 1987. He played for West Coast in the 1987 and 1989 seasons, scoring a total of 29 goals in 20 games.

He finished his AFL career in Victoria with Geelong in the second half of 1992, scoring seven goals in three games. He returned to WA and completed his career with Subiaco Football Club playing a total of 195 games attaining a Club Fairest and Best and securing Life Membership.

== Professional career ==
Macnish gained a Civil Engineering degree and graduated with his Master's degree in Business Administration in March 1991 making him the first player in the newly constituted AFL to a attain such a qualification. He became a Management Consultant with Deloitte. He furthered his tertiary qualifications in; Insurance (and became a Fellow of the Australian and New Zealand Institute of Insurance and Finance), Town Planning, Bushfire Protection and gained another master's degree in sustainability management.

Macnish chose to raise his young family in the country and was CEO at the Shire of Bridgetown from 1998 to 2003.

Macnish was then CEO at Shire of Busselton, WA from 2003 to 2010 where he requested the Council mutually agree a contract termination.

In 2014 he resigned after only six weeks as the General Manager of George Town Council, Tas after the Council voted against his permanent employment, following a television interview where Macnish spoke of the sense of shire amalgamations and criticism of the Local Government Act. The Mayor resigned in protest having helped recruit Macnish to lead significant reform.

In 2016 attempts to negotiate on a draft employment offer for the Chief Executive Officer position at Town of Mosman Park, WA led to the offer being withdrawn without reasons given. In 2017 Macnish took legal action in the Supreme Court against the Town of Mosman Park regarding the withdrawn offer.

In October 2023 he was elected to the City of Busselton. At his first Council meeting he was elected to the Audit and Risk Committee and would go on to be voted its Chair by his peers. He created headlines after criticising the Council's actions in forcing Councillors onto a Committee they had not voted to create nor had nominated for. After legal advice was sought the Council then chose to act as he had suggested. It is believed this was the first time the relevant section of the Local Government Act had been used in this way.
