= Allan McKellar =

Australian rules footballer

Personal information
- Full name: Allan McKellar
- Born: 14 January 1967 (age 59)
- Original team: Glen Waverley
- Height: 178 cm (5 ft 10 in)
- Weight: 74 kg (163 lb)

Playing career^{1}
Years	Club	Games (Goals)
1986–1990	Richmond	45 (15)
1991	Footscray	0 (0)
1992	Sydney Swans	2 (0)
Total		47 (15)
- ^{1} Playing statistics correct to the end of 1992.

Allan McKellar (born 14 January 1967) is a former Australian rules footballer who played with Richmond and the Sydney Swans in the Victorian/Australian Football League (VFL/AFL).

McKellar spent five seasons playing with Richmond. He had his best year in 1989 when he was third at the club for disposals and their top vote getter in the Brownlow Medal, with 10 votes. In the 1991 Pre-Season Draft, McKellar was picked up by Footscray, with the 14th selection, but he wouldn't play a senior AFL game for the club. He made his way to Sydney in 1992 and made two appearances for the Swans in the 1992 AFL season.
