= Lawrence Bingham =

Australian rules footballer

Personal information
- Full name: Lawrence Bingham
- Born: 28 May 1969 (age 57); England
- Original team: Old Haileybury Football Club
- Height: 200 cm (6 ft 7 in)
- Weight: 95 kg (209 lb)

Playing career^{1}
Years	Club	Games (Goals)
1989–1991	Hawthorn	3 (0)
1992–1993	St Kilda	22 (0)
Total		25 (0)
- ^{1} Playing statistics correct to the end of 1993.

Lawrence Bingham (born 28 May 1969 in England) is a former Australian rules footballer who played with Hawthorn and St Kilda in the Victorian Football League (VFL).

Bingham appeared in the opening and 20th rounds of the 1989 VFL season, a premiership year for Hawthorn. After playing just once in 1990 and not featuring at all in the 1991 season, Bingham was traded to St Kilda.

A ruckman, he was selected more regularly at his new club, appearing eight times in 1992. Bingham then had his most productive season in 1993, playing 14 games. He had 178 hit outs that year, the most by any St Kilda player.

In 1994, he played for Victorian Football Association club Frankston.

He is one of a handful of league footballers to have been born in England.
