= David Johnston (Australian footballer) =

Australian rules footballer

Personal information
- Full name: David Johnston
- Born: 10 April 1969 (age 57)
- Original team: Doutta Stars
- Height: 180 cm (5 ft 11 in)
- Weight: 80 kg (176 lb)

Playing career^{1}
Years	Club	Games (Goals)
1987–1992	Essendon	41 (6)
1992–1994	Fitzroy	25 (1)
Total		66 (7)
- ^{1} Playing statistics correct to the end of 1994.

David Johnston (born 10 April 1969) is a former Australian rules footballer who played with Essendon and Fitzroy in the Victorian/Australian Football League (VFL/AFL).

A half back, Johnston represented Victoria in the 1985 Teal Cup, during which time he played Under-19s football for Essendon. He was playing for the Doutta Stars when he made it into Essendon's senior list and made his VFL debut in 1987. Johnston found it difficult to establish a place in the Essendon defence due to the strength of the team and never played more than half a season. He appeared in the last six games of the 1990 home and away season but wasn't picked in the finals, where Essendon were grand final losers. The following year he appeared in an elimination final against Melbourne and had 16 disposals.

Late in the 1992 AFL season, Johnston transferred to Fitzroy where he finished his career.
