= David Strooper =

Australian rules footballer

Personal information
- Full name: David Strooper
- Born: 25 February 1968 (age 58)
- Original team: South Colac
- Height: 191 cm (6 ft 3 in)
- Weight: 81 kg (179 lb)

Playing career^{1}
Years	Club	Games (Goals)
1987–1991	Fitzroy	43 (28)
1992–1993	Sydney Swans	32 (58)
1994	St Kilda	6 (3)
Total		81 (89)
- ^{1} Playing statistics correct to the end of 1994.

David Strooper (born 25 February 1968) is a former Australian rules footballer who played with Fitzroy, Sydney Swans and St Kilda in the Victorian/Australian Football League (VFL/AFL).

Originally from South Colac, Strooper was a utility player who was often used as a key forward. He spent much of his time at Fitzroy in the reserves and had his best return in 1990 with 14 senior games. After playing just six league games the following year, Strooper nominated for the 1991 AFL draft and was picked by Sydney with the 43rd selection.

He made an immediate impression at Sydney in 1992, with four goals in his first game and a five-goal haul in his second. His final tally of 44 goals, from 22 games, was enough to finish second in the goal-kicking behind another new recruit; Simon Minton-Connell. Strooper's 131 marks was easily the most by a Swans player that season. He was unable to repeat these efforts with a struggling Sydney side in 1993 and added just 10 more games, all of which were in losses. Delisted, he was given another chance by St Kilda, who secured him with the fourth pick of the 1994 Pre-Season Draft. He appeared in the opening two rounds of the 1994 AFL season but was hampered by injuries during the year and played just four more games.

Strooper was later part of a successful Northcote Park side, which competed in the Diamond Valley Football League.
