= Dale Fleming =

Australian rules footballer

Personal information
- Full name: Dale P. Fleming
- Born: 20 August 1971 (age 55)
- Original team: Canterbury
- Height: 183 cm (6 ft 0 in)
- Weight: 84 kg (185 lb)

Playing career^{1}
Years	Club	Games (Goals)
1992–1993	Fitzroy	13 (15)
- ^{1} Playing statistics correct to the end of 1993.

Dale Fleming (born 20 August 1971) is a former Australian rules footballer who played with Fitzroy in the Australian Football League (AFL).

Fleming started his AFL career at Hawthorn, but was traded to Fitzroy without making an appearance in the seniors. He played 11 games for Fitzroy in the 1992 AFL season and had a five-goal haul in a win over the Sydney Swans at the SCG. In 1993 he appeared in only two senior rounds, and was the reserves league leading goalkicker for the home-and-away season, with 57 goals. Fleming left the club at the end of the year, and moved to South Australia in 1994, where he played for Norwood until 2001. He was a member of Norwood's 1997 premiership team.
