= Gavin Rose =

Australian rules footballer

Personal information
- Full name: Gavin Vernon Rose
- Born: 29 September 1969 (age 57)
- Original team: East Perth (WAFL)
- Draft: 38th, 1989 National Draft
- Height: 194 cm (6 ft 4 in)
- Weight: 95 kg (209 lb)

Playing career^{1}
Years	Club	Games (Goals)
1990–1991	Collingwood	0 (0)
1992–1996	Sydney Swans	55 (4)
Total		55 (4)
- ^{1} Playing statistics correct to the end of 1996.

Gavin Rose (born 29 September 1969) is a former Australian rules footballer who played with the Sydney Swans in the Australian Football League (AFL).

Originally from Western Australian Football League club East Perth, Rose was drafted by Collingwood, with the 38th selection of the 1989 National Draft. He didn't manage to break into the seniors during his time at the club and was traded to Sydney.

At the Swans Rose was used early on as a defender but developed into a ruckman. He was Sydney's leading ruckman in 1994 and 1995, topping the hit-outs in both years.

After leaving Sydney, Rose returned to East Perth.
