= Andrew Lamprill =

Australian rules footballer

Personal information
- Full name: Andrew Lamprill
- Born: 4 May 1969 (age 57)
- Original team: Hobart
- Draft: No. 10, 1991 National Draft
- Height: 186 cm (6 ft 1 in)
- Weight: 87 kg (192 lb)

Playing career^{1}
Years	Club	Games (Goals)
1992–1997	Melbourne	36 (3)
- ^{1} Playing statistics correct to the end of 1997.

Andrew Lamprill (born 4 May 1969) is a former Australian rules footballer who played with Melbourne in the Australian Football League (AFL).

== AFL career ==
Lamprill, a member of Hobart's 1990 premiership team, was selected by Melbourne with pick 10 in the 1991 National Draft. After amassing just 10 games in his first three seasons, Lamprill doubled his tally in 1995 and made 13 appearances in 1996. A defender, he played three games in 1997, late in the season, but was delisted at the end of the year.

== Coaching ==
Lamprill went to Vermont after leaving Melbourne and was senior coach from 2001 to 2003. He then returned to Tasmania and in 2006 and 2007 was coach of Hobart.
