= Teia Miles =

Australian rules footballer

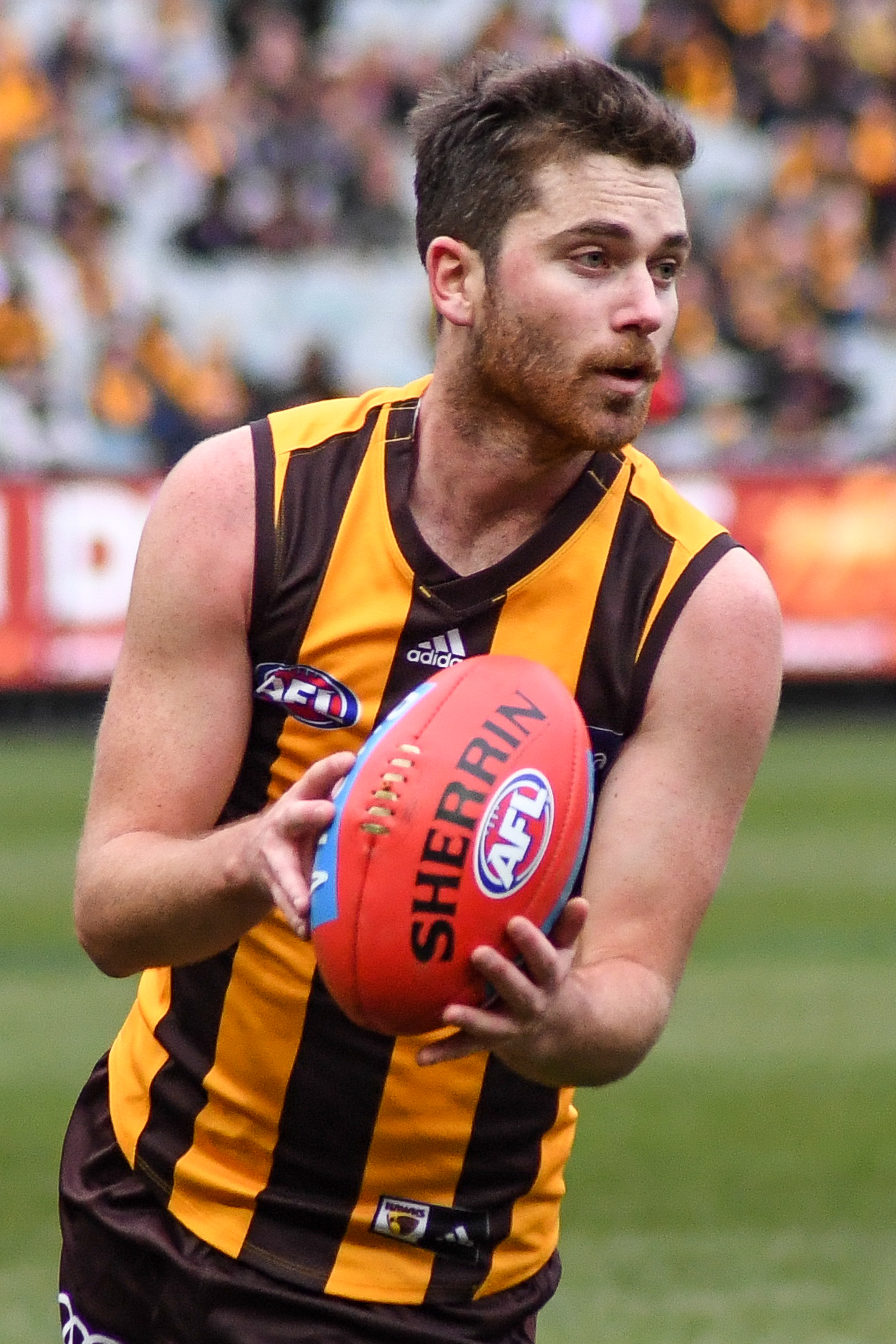
- Miles playing for Hawthorn in August 2018

Personal information
- Full name: Teia Miles
- Born: 2 November 1996 (age 30)
- Original team: Geelong Falcons (TAC Cup)
- Draft: No. 49, 2014 national draft
- Debut: Round 2, 2017, Hawthorn vs. Adelaide, at Melbourne Cricket Ground
- Height: 180 cm (5 ft 11 in)
- Weight: 70 kg (154 lb)
- Position: Midfielder

Playing career
Years	Club	Games (Goals)
2015–2019	Hawthorn	12 (5)
2015–2019	Box Hill (VFL)	81 (51)
2021–2022	Williamstown (VFL)	25 (2)

Career highlights
- VFL premiership player: 2018; Box Hill leading goalkicker: 2016

Teia Miles (born 2 November 1996) is a professional Australian rules footballer who played for the Hawthorn Football Club in the Australian Football League (AFL). He is a highly rated young midfielder, with the ability to play forward or back when required, and is renowned for his endurance.

== AFL career ==
Miles was drafted by Hawthorn with their second selection and forty-ninth overall in the 2014 national draft. In 2016, Miles played 15 matches in the Victorian Football League (VFL) for the Box Hill before a broken collarbone late in the season ended his year. After two years in the AFL, he made his debut in the twenty-four point loss to Adelaide at the Melbourne Cricket Ground in round 2, 2017.

In 2018 he played the last eight games of the regular season only to be dropped for the finals campaign. He returned to Box Hill where he was an important member of the VFL premiership side.

He was delisted by Hawthorn at end of the 2019 AFL season.

== Post-AFL career ==
In 2021, Miles joined Williamstown in the Victorian Football League. In 2022, he played his 100th VFL game.

At the end of the 2022 VFL season, Miles was signed by Claremont in the West Australian Football League.

== Family ==
He is the son of former Collingwood, West Coast Eagles and Geelong player, Geoff Miles, and the cousin of former Carlton and Greater Western Sydney player, Dylan Buckley. Miles' sister is married to Geelong player, Mitch Duncan.

== Statistics ==
Legend
G	Goals	K	Kicks	D	Disposals	T	Tackles
B	Behinds	H	Handballs	M	Marks

Season	Team	No.	Games	Totals							Averages (per game)							Votes
Season	Team	No.	Games	G	B	K	H	D	M	T	G	B	K	H	D	M	T	Votes
2015	Hawthorn	42	0	—	—	—	—	—	—	—	—	—	—	—	—	—	—	0
2016	Hawthorn	42	0	—	—	—	—	—	—	—	—	—	—	—	—	—	—	0
2017	Hawthorn	42	4	3	0	25	18	43	13	5	0.8	0.0	6.3	4.5	10.8	3.3	1.3	0
2018	Hawthorn	42	8	2	0	89	46	135	33	17	0.3	0.0	11.1	5.8	16.9	4.1	2.1	0
2019	Hawthorn	42	0	—	—	—	—	—	—	—	—	—	—	—	—	—	—	0
Career			12	5	0	114	64	178	46	22	0.4	0.0	9.5	5.3	14.8	3.8	1.8	0

== Honours and achievements ==
Team

- VFL premiership player (Box Hill): 2018
- Minor premiership (Box Hill): 2015

Individual

- Box Hill leading goalkicker: 2016
