= Andy Goodwin =

Australian rules footballer

Personal information
- Full name: Andy Goodwin
- Born: 29 June 1963 (age 63)
- Original team: Wandin
- Height: 188 cm (6 ft 2 in)
- Weight: 86 kg (190 lb)

Playing career^{1}
Years	Club	Games (Goals)
1987–1991	Richmond	56 (9)
1992–1993	Melbourne	17 (0)
Total		73 (9)
- ^{1} Playing statistics correct to the end of 1993.

Andy Goodwin (born 29 June 1963) is a former Australian rules footballer who played with Richmond and Melbourne in the Australian Football League (AFL).

Goodwin didn't start playing football until the age of 18. He began his career at Wandin, which recruited him after he attended a wedding at the club. In 1986 he made some reserves appearances for St Kilda. The following year he had a stint at Box Hill, then made it into the seniors at Richmond. He spent five seasons with Richmond and then joined Melbourne, via the 1992 Pre-season Draft. After two seasons at Melbourne, Goodwin moved to Tasmania, appointed playing coach of Devonport. While in Tasmania he captained the state at interstate football. He remained with Devonport until 1997, when he joined Frankston. Following another brief stint at Devonport, Goodwin returned to Wandin, where he played until the age of 39, retiring after suffering a 22nd broken nose. In 2014, Goodwin was appointed playing coach of the Kinglake Football/Netball Club. During a reserves match between Richmond and Essendon at the MCG in 1991, Andy broke the jaw of Essendon ruckman John Barnes in a marking contest.
