= Brett Sholl =

Australian rules footballer

Personal information
- Full name: Brett Sholl
- Born: 7 September 1971 (age 55)
- Original team: Irymple
- Height: 188 cm (6 ft 2 in)
- Weight: 82 kg (181 lb)
- Position: Wing

Playing career^{1}
Years	Club	Games (Goals)
1992–94	Carlton	35 (9)
- ^{1} Playing statistics correct to the end of 1994.

Brett Sholl (born 7 September 1971) is a former Australian rules footballer who played for Carlton in the Australian Football League (AFL).

Sholl was a wingman but also played some games as a half forward flanker. North Melbourne recruited him from Irymple but he was unable to break into their seniors and ended up at Carlton. He gathered 13 disposals from the wing in the 1993 AFL Grand Final, which Carlton lost to Essendon.
