= Grant Williams (footballer) =

Australian rules footballer

Personal information
- Full name: Grant Williams
- Born: 15 November 1969 (age 56)
- Original teams: Sandy Bay, (TFL)
- Draft: No. 12, 1987 national draft No. 9, 1991 mid-year draft

Playing career^{1}
Years	Club	Games (Goals)
1992	Melbourne	4 (5)
- ^{1} Playing statistics correct to the end of 1992.

Grant Williams (born 15 November 1969) is a former Australian rules footballer who played for Melbourne in the Australian Football League (AFL) in 1992. He was recruited from the Sandy Bay Football Club in the Tasmanian Football League (TFL) with the 9th selection in the 1991 Mid-year Draft. He later returned to Tasmania and played for the Burnie Dockers.
