= Steven O'Dwyer =

Australian rules footballer (born 1966)

Personal information
- Born: 19 January 1966 (age 60); Lithgow, New South Wales
- Original team: St. Bernards
- Height: 201 cm (6 ft 7 in)
- Weight: 100 kg (220 lb)

Playing career^{1}
Years	Club	Games (Goals)
1987–1991	Melbourne	84 (45)
1992	Richmond	5 (0)
Total		89 (45)
- ^{1} Playing statistics correct to the end of 1992.

Career highlights
- Keith 'Bluey' Truscott Medal: 1988

Steven O'Dwyer (born 19 January 1966) is a former Australian rules footballer who played for Melbourne in the VFL/AFL.

A redheaded lanky ruckman, O'Dwyer won the 1988 Keith 'Bluey' Truscott Medal for Melbourne's best and fairest player, helping the club reach their first Grand Final since 1964. However, he missed the decider after being suspended for striking Carlton's Steven Da Rui in the Preliminary Final.

O'Dwyer was traded to Richmond for a draft pick (Darren Kowal) at the end of the 1991 season. Injuries forced O'Dwyer into retirement a year later only managing five games with the Tigers.

== Statistics ==
Legend
G	Goals	K	Kicks	D	Disposals	T	Tackles
B	Behinds	H	Handballs	M	Marks	H/O	Hit-outs

Season	Team	No.	Games	Totals								Averages (per game)							
Season	Team	No.	Games	G	B	K	H	D	M	T	H/O	G	B	K	H	D	M	T	H/O
1987	Melbourne	32	17	3	4	87	45	132	57	16	239	0.2	0.2	5.1	2.6	7.8	3.4	0.9	14.1
1988	Melbourne	1	24	16	13	210	80	290	136	25	286	0.7	0.5	8.8	3.3	12.1	5.7	1.0	11.9
1989	Melbourne	1	17	6	5	118	47	165	76	9	244	0.4	0.3	6.9	2.8	9.7	4.5	0.5	14.4
1990	Melbourne	1	15	9	3	89	48	137	48	6	139	0.6	0.2	5.9	3.2	9.1	3.2	0.4	9.3
1991	Melbourne	1	11	11	2	59	28	87	45	3	95	1.0	0.2	5.4	2.5	7.9	4.1	0.3	8.6
1992	Richmond	1	5	0	1	20	27	47	16	1	41	0.0	0.2	4.0	5.4	9.4	3.2	0.2	8.2
Career			89	45	28	583	275	858	378	60	1044	0.5	0.3	6.6	3.1	9.7	4.2	0.7	11.7
