= Chris Barrett (Australian footballer) =

Australian rules footballer

Personal information
- Full name: Chris Barrett
- Born: 24 March 1973 (age 53)
- Original team: Torquay (BFL)

Playing career^{1}
| Years | Club | Games (Goals) |
| 1992 -2004 | Fitzroy | 4 (4) |
- ^{1} Playing statistics correct to the end of 1992.

Chris Barrett (born 24 March 1973) is a former Australian rules footballer who played for Fitzroy in the Australian Football League (AFL) and Port Adelaide and West Adelaide in the South Australian National Football League (SANFL).

Originally from the Torquay Football Club in the Bellarine Football League (BFL), Barrett was drafted by Fitzroy at number 64 at the 1991 AFL draft. Barrett played 5 games for Fitzroy in 1992 before moving to the SANFL.
