= Brendan Bower =

Australian rules footballer

Personal information
- Born: 4 August 1966 (age 60)
- Original team: Mildura
- Debut: Round 5, 1986, Richmond vs. St Kilda, at M.C.G.
- Height: 188 cm (6 ft 2 in)
- Weight: 108 kg (238 lb)

Playing career^{1}
Years	Club	Games (Goals)
1986–1991	Richmond	92 (19)
1992	Essendon	3 (3)
1993	North Melbourne	2 (3)
Total		97 (25)
- ^{1} Playing statistics correct to the end of 1993.

Brendan Bower is an Australian rules footballer who played for Richmond, Essendon and North Melbourne. He made his debut with Richmond against St Kilda in round 5 of 1986 season and played 92 games with Richmond. He was drafted by Essendon in 1991 AFL draft and played 3 games in the 1992 season. In the 1992 AFL draft he was picked up by North Melbourne and played 2 games for them in 1993.
