= Brad Gwilliam =

Australian rules footballer

Personal information
- Full name: Brad Gwilliam
- Born: 8 September 1966 (age 60)
- Original team: West Perth
- Height: 190 cm (6 ft 3 in)
- Weight: 85 kg (187 lb)

Playing career^{1}
Years	Club	Games (Goals)
1990–1991	West Coast Eagles	4 (0)
1992	Richmond	4 (0)
Total		8 (0)
- ^{1} Playing statistics correct to the end of 1992.

Brad Gwilliam (born 8 September, 1966) is a former Australian rules footballer who played with the West Coast Eagles and Richmond in the Australian Football League (AFL).

Gwilliam was picked up by West Coast with the last selection of the 1989 VFL Draft, one of three additional draft picks the club has been given. He appeared in the first three games of the 1990 AFL season but didn't play again until round 16. He remained on the list during 1991 but did not play for at the senior level.

He went to Richmond in 1992, through the pre-season draft after being delisted from West Coast, and was their full-back for four games early in the year. In the fourth, against Adelaide at Football Park, he badly injured his knee in a collision with a goalpost and never played another AFL match.
