= Mark Majerczak =

Australian rules footballer

Personal information
- Full name: Mark Majerczak
- Born: 20 April 1968 (age 58)
- Original team: Fawkner
- Height: 180 cm (5 ft 11 in)
- Weight: 75 kg (165 lb)
- Position: Forward pocket

Playing career^{1}
Years	Club	Games (Goals)
1987–1991	Carlton	17 (20)
- ^{1} Playing statistics correct to the end of 1991.

Mark Majerczak (born 20 April 1968) is a former Australian rules footballer who played with Carlton in the Australian Football League (AFL).
