= Brendan Krummel =

Australian rules footballer

Personal information
- Born: 24 June 1972 (age 54)
- Original team: East Fremantle (WAFL)
- Debut: Round 6, 1992, West Coast vs. Richmond, at the MCG
- Height: 185 cm (6 ft 1 in)
- Weight: 88 kg (194 lb)

Playing career^{1}
Years	Club	Games (Goals)
1992–1994	West Coast	9 (3)
1995	Fremantle	1 (0)
1996–2000	Hawthorn	64 (47)
Total		74 (50)
- ^{1} Playing statistics correct to the end of 2000.

Career highlights
- East Fremantle premiership side 1992

Brendan Alan Krummel (born 24 June 1972) is a former Australian rules footballer who played for West Coast, Fremantle and Hawthorn in the AFL.

A West Australian, Krummel started his league career with the West Coast Eagles but struggled to get game time due to the strength of the club in the early 1990s. In three seasons at the club he played just 9 games and decided to join Fremantle for their inaugural season in 1995. He played in Fremantle's first ever AFL game in round one but injuries ensured that it would be his only game for the Dockers.

Krummel made a move to Victoria in 1996 after being selected at pick 5 in the draft by Hawthorn, reuniting with Ken Judge, his former coach at East Fremantle. He played both forward and back but was again hampered by injuries.

in 1999 in a game against the Kangaroos he was on the receiving end of one of the greatest hip and shoulder bumps of all time, dished out by the then rampaging Byron Pickett. This hit lead to a rule change from the AFL about front on contact.

After 64 games with the Hawks he announced his retirement during the 2000 season.
