= Tony Woods (Australian footballer) =

Australian rules footballer

Personal information
- Born: 2 July 1969 (age 57)
- Original team: Old Paradians (VAFA)

Playing career^{1}
Years	Club	Games (Goals)
1988–1990	Fitzroy	13 (4)
1992–1994	Collingwood	18 (6)
1995–2002	Hawthorn	142 (26)
Total		173 (36)
- ^{1} Playing statistics correct to the end of 2002.

Tony Woods (born 2 July 1969) is a former Australian rules footballer in the Australian Football League who commenced his career with Fitzroy in 1988. In 1992 he moved to Collingwood, playing 18 games before moving to Hawthorn in 1995. He finally became a valuable player in the 1996 season where he was a fine tagger, although in 1997 he was involved in more attacking roles in the midfield.

In the 1998 season his media profile also soared with regular appearances and production work on The Footy Show on the Nine Network. He also reverted to a tagging role where he had further success culminating in second place in the 1999 Club Champion.

In the 2001 season he struggled but as many Hawks did, he lifted during the 2001 Finals Series and agreed to play one final year of AFL. However, 2002 was ruined by injury and Woods retired from AFL midway through the season.

Woods went on to work with the Gold Coast Football Club as it prepared to enter the AFL, before being appointed the AFL's first full-time International Development Manager.
