= Richard Dennis (footballer) =

Australian rules footballer

Personal information
- Born: 31 July 1966 (age 60)
- Original team: East Perth (WAFL)
- Height: 185 cm (6 ft 1 in)
- Weight: 82 kg (181 lb)

Playing career^{1}
Years	Club	Games (Goals)
1987–91	Carlton	57 (40)
1992	North Melbourne	13 (6)
Total		70 (46)
- ^{1} Playing statistics correct to the end of 1992.

Richard Stuart Dennis (born 31 July 1966) is a former Australian rules footballer who played for Carlton and North Melbourne in the VFL/AFL.

Dennis was a half forward from Western Australia who made his senior Western Australian Football League (WAFL) debut for East Perth in 1983, aged 16. Dennis played 70 games for East Perth before his recruitment by Carlton at the end of 1986.

Dennis debuted for Carlton in 1987 and played in the 1987 VFL Grand Final, which Carlton won, as well as playing for Western Australia against Victoria.

Dennis transferred to North Melbourne in 1992, playing only one season for North before returning to Western Australia, playing for West Perth.
