= Wayne Henwood =

Australian rules footballer

Personal information
- Full name: Wayne Henwood
- Born: 15 October 1962 (age 64); Perth
- Height: 194 cm (6 ft 4 in)
- Weight: 110 kg (243 lb)
- Position: Utility

Playing career^{1}
| Years | Club | Games (Goals) |
| 1981–1984 | South Fremantle (WAFL) | 67 (11) |
| 1985–1986 | Glenelg (SANFL) | 54 (20) |
| 1987–1991 | Sydney (VFL) | 78 (45) |
| 1991–1992 | St Marys (NTFL) | |
| 1992 | Melbourne (AFL) | 1 (0) |
| 1993 | East Devonport | |
| Total | | 200 (76) |

Representative team honours
| Years | Team | Games (Goals) |
| 1987–1992 | Western Australia | 4 (0) |
| | South Australia | 1 |
| | Northern Territory | 1 |
- ^{1} Playing statistics correct to the end of 1992.

Wayne "Moose" Henwood (born 15 October 1962) is a former Australian rules footballer who played for Sydney and Melbourne in the Victorian/Australia Football League (VFL/AFL).

Henwood started his career in 1981 at Western Australian Football League (WAFL) club South Fremantle. In 1985 he transferred to Glenelg in the South Australian National Football League (SANFL), appearing in their 1985 and 1986 premiership teams.

Sydney recruited Henwood for the 1987 VFL season and he played all possible 24 games in his first year, including two finals.

A centre half forward or defender, Henwood represented WWestern Australia four times including the 1988 Adelaide Bicentennial Carnival. He also represented South Australia and Northern Territory. Henwood crossed to his fourth state in 1992 when he joined Melbourne but time ran out and he could only manage one game.

The Glenelg premiership player then become a barrister and since 2007 has been a member of the AFL Tribunal and anti-doping tribunal notably as one of three tribunal members on the Essendon drug saga.
