= Richard Taylor (Australian footballer) =

Australian rules footballer

Personal information
- Born: 14 July 1973 (age 53)
- Original team: Camberwell Grammar
- Debut: Round 20, 1992, Hawthorn vs. Essendon, at the M.C.G
- Height: 173 cm (5 ft 8 in)
- Weight: 76 kg (168 lb)

Playing career^{1}
Years	Club	Games (Goals)
1992–2000	Hawthorn	112 (46)
2001–2002	West Coast	28 (11)
Total		140 (57)
- ^{1} Playing statistics correct to the end of 2002.

Richard Taylor (born 14 July 1973) is a former Australian rules footballer who played with Hawthorn and West Coast in the AFL.

Taylor was a rover and made his debut for Hawthorn in a game again Essendon in 1992, contributing 3 goals in a 160-point win. After suffering a knee injury in 1993 he was delisted but was picked up again in the pre-season draft. He finished second in Hawthorn's 1999 Best and Fairest awards.
