= John Barnes (Australian footballer) =

Australian rules footballer, born 1969

Cr John Barnes

Councillor of the City of Moonee Valley for Buckley Ward
- Incumbent
- Assumed office 26 October 2024

Personal details
- Born: John Barnes; 1 June 1969 (age 57)
- Party: One Nation
- Other political affiliations: Liberal (formerly)
Australian rules football career
Personal information
- Original team: Cobram (MFL)
- Height: 193 cm (6 ft 4 in)
- Weight: 95 kg (209 lb)
Playing career^{1}
Years	Club	Games (Goals)
1987–1990	Essendon	12 (12)
1992–1999	Geelong	144 (65)
2000–2001	Essendon	46 (13)
Total		202 (90)
- ^{1} Playing statistics correct to the end of 2001.
Career highlights
- Essendon premiership side, 2000

John Barnes (born 1 June 1969) is an Australian politician and former Australian rules footballer who currently serves as the councillor for Buckley Ward on the City of Moonee Valley. He previously played for the Essendon Football Club and the Geelong Football Club in the Australian Football League (AFL).

== Football career ==
Barnes' VFL/AFL career included two State of Origin games for Victoria.

=== Early career – from Essendon to Geelong ===
The young Barnes was a ruckman/forward recruited by Essendon in 1986 from Cobram, Victoria. He was traded after five seasons with Windy Hill to the Geelong Football Club for Sean Denham. Under the coaching of Malcolm Blight and later Gary Ayres he would go on to feature prominently in the losing 1994 and 1995 Grand Final sides. During a Round 5 encounter at Princes Park against Carlton in 1997, after a marking duel, Barnes landed awkwardly on his left elbow, dislocating it and sidelining him for ten weeks. Barnes was delisted by the club in 1999. He had played a total of 144 games with 65 goals with the Cats.

=== Return to Essendon ===
It was Essendon coach Kevin Sheedy, however, who tempted Barnes back to Windy Hill, and he was selected at number #59 in the 1999 AFL draft. A shortage of ruckmen at the club led Sheedy to reacquaint Barnes with his former club. A season later, after a defeat to Brisbane in the 2001 Grand Final, Barnes retired. He had totalled 58 games and 25 goals with the Bombers during his original tenure and return to the club.

=== Post-playing career ===
Barnes was a runner for Essendon and was fined by the AFL for spending too long on the ground, before he was controversially suspended for two matches by the AFL for interfering with play during the 2005 season.

In 2004, he played for the East Keilor Football Club in the Essendon District Football League. He participated in the 2006 AFL Legends Match, playing for Victoria. Barnes became the ruck coach for the Western Bulldogs in the 2008 season.

In 2009, he was appointed as coach of the Doutta Stars Football Club in the Essendon District Football League.

He also had a stint as the ruck coach for the Collingwood Football Club, but left that role and 'got completely out of footy' to become, as of 2015, a garbage collector in suburban Melbourne.

== Political career ==
Barnes contested Buckley Ward on the City of Moonee Valley at the 2024 Victorian local government elections as an Independent Liberal Party candidate. He was elected with 26.60% of first preferences and 57.05% of the two-candidate-preferred vote.

In August 2026, Barnes was announced as a One Nation candidate for the Electoral district of Essendon at the 2026 Victorian state election.

== Health and personal life ==
Barnes suffers from Chronic Traumatic Encephalopathy (CTE)—an acquired brain injury from repeated concussions—and post-traumatic epilepsy (PTE), both related to repeated head knocks received on the football field. These conditions have led Barnes to be unable to do everyday tasks like cooking and driving, led to diminished memory and cognitive ability, and made him prone to sudden mood swings and outbursts.

== Statistics ==
Legend
G	Goals	K	Kicks	D	Disposals	T	Tackles
B	Behinds	H	Handballs	M	Marks	H/O	Hit-outs

Season	Team	No.	Games	Totals								Averages (per game)							
Season	Team	No.	Games	G	B	K	H	D	M	T	H/O	G	B	K	H	D	M	T	H/O
1987	Essendon	20	6	9	4	21	8	29	14	6	2	1.5	0.7	3.5	1.3	4.8	2.3	1.0	0.3
1988	Essendon	20	2	0	1	12	6	18	8	1	1	0.0	0.5	6.0	3.0	9.0	4.0	0.5	0.5
1989	Essendon	20	2	1	1	10	8	18	8	2	5	0.5	0.5	5.0	4.0	9.0	4.0	1.0	2.5
1990	Essendon	20	2	2	1	9	8	17	6	1	7	1.0	0.5	4.5	4.0	8.5	3.0	0.5	3.5
1991	Essendon	20	0	—	—	—	—	—	—	—	—	—	—	—	—	—	—	—	—
1992	Geelong	6	13	5	0	106	73	179	74	7	165	0.4	0.0	8.2	5.6	13.8	5.7	0.5	12.7
1993	Geelong	6	18	4	1	149	130	279	116	10	265	0.2	0.1	8.3	7.2	15.5	6.4	0.6	14.7
1994	Geelong	6	24	1	1	184	181	365	132	16	389	0.0	0.0	7.7	7.5	15.2	5.5	0.7	16.2
1995	Geelong	6	25	9	7	183	218	401	185	22	285	0.4	0.3	7.3	8.7	16.0	7.4	0.9	11.4
1996	Geelong	6	19	16	6	151	122	273	114	9	225	0.8	0.3	7.9	6.4	14.4	6.0	0.5	11.8
1997	Geelong	6	15	12	13	118	71	189	82	6	104	0.8	0.9	7.9	4.7	12.6	5.5	0.4	6.9
1998	Geelong	6	15	9	4	114	83	197	69	15	173	0.6	0.3	7.6	5.5	13.1	4.6	1.0	11.5
1999	Geelong	6	15	9	1	126	81	207	77	8	216	0.6	0.1	8.4	5.4	13.8	5.1	0.5	14.4
2000	Essendon	22	24	10	2	188	123	311	115	26	400	0.4	0.1	7.8	5.1	13.0	4.8	1.1	16.7
2001	Essendon	22	22	3	1	133	100	233	78	23	218	0.1	0.0	6.0	4.5	10.6	3.5	1.0	9.9
Career			202	90	43	1504	1212	2716	1078	152	2455	0.4	0.2	7.4	6.0	13.4	5.3	0.8	12.2
