= Mark Athorn =

Australian rules footballer

Personal information
- Full name: Mark Athorn
- Born: 7 November 1967 (age 58)
- Original team: East Keilor
- Height: 178 cm (5 ft 10 in)
- Weight: 76 kg (168 lb)
- Position: Defender

Playing career^{1}
Years	Club	Games (Goals)
1987–1989	Footscray	17 (4)
1990	Fitzroy	21 (0)
1991	Sydney	15 (7)
1992–1993	Carlton	30 (6)
Total		83 (17)
- ^{1} Playing statistics correct to the end of 1993.

Mark Athorn (born 7 November 1967) is a former Australian rules footballer who played with Footscray, Fitzroy, Sydney and Carlton in the Australian Football League (AFL).

A defender, Athorn was used mostly in the back pocket but could also play as a tagger. After being recruited from East Keilor he started his league career at Footscray and played three seasons for the Bulldogs. He then spent a season each at Fitzroy and Sydney before crossing to his fourth and final club Carlton.

Although he spent most of the 1993 season in the reserves, where he was Carlton's 'Best and fairest' winner, Athorn played in the 1993 AFL Grand Final. He was given the task of tagging Michael Long who won the Norm Smith Medal. It was Athorn's last game of league football.
