= Sean Denham =

Australian rules footballer, born 1969

Personal information
- Full name: Sean Denham
- Born: 29 April 1969 (age 57); Essendon
- Original team: Melton South (RDFL)

Playing career^{1}
Years	Club	Games (Goals)
1987–1991	Geelong	44 (21)
1992–2000	Essendon	142 (44)
Total		186 (65)
- ^{1} Playing statistics correct to the end of 2000.

Career highlights
- Essendon premiership side, 1993; Crichton Medal, 1997

Sean Denham (born 29 April 1969) is a former Australian rules footballer.

Recruited from Melton South, Denham was an unheralded rover, who came to Essendon from Geelong in a swap that saw ruckman John Barnes sent the other way following the 1991 season. His style of play as a tagging run-with player, typified during the 1990s the changing face of the modern game. Despite having a small stature, Denham's tough approach and ability to verbally rile his opponent, coupled with his tagging role sparked a massive on-field rivalry with fiery Carlton rover Greg Williams during the 1990s. Popular football commentator Rex Hunt once described Denham as "The Brush" or "Dunny brush Denham" during his radio broadcasts.

After a spate of poor form and injuries after the club's successful 2000 season, aged 31 he decided to retire. He and Barnes played alongside each other during that premiership season. During his 132 games for the Bombers, he played a fundamental role in the 1993 premiership side and was the club's best and fairest, winning the 1997 Crichton Medal after being runner up in 1994.

== Statistics ==
Legend
G	Goals	K	Kicks	D	Disposals	T	Tackles
B	Behinds	H	Handballs	M	Marks

Season	Team	No.	Games	Totals							Averages (per game)							Votes
Season	Team	No.	Games	G	B	K	H	D	M	T	G	B	K	H	D	M	T	Votes
1987	Geelong	58	2	1	2	11	6	17	3	3	0.5	1.0	5.5	3.0	8.5	1.5	1.5	0
1988	Geelong	18	22	9	14	287	228	515	86	58	0.4	0.6	13.0	10.4	23.4	3.9	2.6	0
1989	Geelong	18	6	3	6	67	33	100	15	14	0.5	1.0	11.2	5.5	16.7	2.5	2.3	0
1990	Geelong	18	9	0	5	77	83	160	11	25	0.0	0.6	8.6	9.2	17.8	1.2	2.8	0
1991	Geelong	18	5	8	5	44	25	69	5	9	1.6	1.0	8.8	5.0	13.8	1.0	1.8	0
1992	Essendon	38	10	4	4	70	68	138	15	21	0.4	0.4	7.0	6.8	13.8	1.5	2.1	0
1993†	Essendon	38	22	7	5	244	180	424	46	57	0.3	0.2	11.1	8.2	19.3	2.1	2.6	2
1994	Essendon	38	20	9	11	275	209	484	75	65	0.5	0.6	13.8	10.5	24.2	3.8	3.3	9
1995	Essendon	38	24	11	15	276	232	508	66	68	0.5	0.6	11.5	9.7	21.2	2.8	2.8	8
1996	Essendon	38	17	2	5	166	174	340	31	52	0.1	0.3	9.8	10.2	20.0	1.8	3.1	3
1997	Essendon	38	22	8	5	242	208	450	54	35	0.4	0.2	11.0	9.5	20.5	2.5	1.6	0
1998	Essendon	38	11	3	2	95	77	172	23	20	0.3	0.2	8.6	7.0	15.6	2.1	1.8	0
1999	Essendon	38	7	0	1	67	42	109	13	19	0.0	0.1	9.6	6.0	15.6	1.9	2.7	0
2000	Essendon	38	9	0	1	75	58	133	20	15	0.0	0.1	8.3	6.4	14.8	2.2	1.7	0
Career			186	65	81	1996	1623	3619	463	461	0.3	0.4	10.7	8.7	19.5	2.5	2.5	22
