= Gavin Exell =

Australian rules footballer

Personal information
- Born: 16 October 1962 (age 64)
- Original team: Northern United (BFL)
- Height: 191 cm (6 ft 3 in)
- Weight: 84 kg (185 lb)

Playing career^{1}
Years	Club	Games (Goals)
1987–1991	Geelong	53 (111)
1992	Fitzroy	5 (2)
Total		58 (113)
- ^{1} Playing statistics correct to the end of 1992.

Gavin Exell (born 16 October 1962) is a former Australian rules footballer who played with Geelong and Fitzroy in the VFL/AFL.

Exell started his career at Carlton, where he played reserves football, but, after being unable to break into the seniors, he joined Geelong. In 1989, he kicked a career-high 63 goals for the season, which topped Geelong's goalkicking in the home-and-away season, but injury prevented him from lining up in the famous 1989 VFL Grand Final. His best individual haul that year was nine goals in a shootout against Hawthorn at Princes Park, where Geelong, despite scoring 163 points, lost the game. He kicked another eight the following week against St Kilda.

Fitzroy acquired his services for the 1992 AFL season, but he could only manage five games for his new club.

He later played for Stanhope in the Kyabram & District Football League and was the competition's leading goalkicker in 2000, 2001 and 2003, with over 100 goals each year.
