= John Hutton (footballer) =

Australian rules footballer (born 1966)

Personal information
- Full name: John Hutton
- Born: 28 May 1966 (age 60)
- Original teams: Claremont, WAFL
- Draft: Brisbane Bears: 1st Selection, 1991 National Draft; Sydney: 5th Selection, 1993 Pre-season Draft Fremantle: Zone Selection, 1994 National Draft
- Height: 186 cm (6 ft 1 in)
- Weight: 86 kg (190 lb)
- Position: Full-forward

Playing career^{1}
Years	Club	Games (Goals)
1992	Brisbane Bears	18 (43)
1993	Sydney	5 (9)
1995	Fremantle	13 (27)
Total		36 (79)
- ^{1} Playing statistics correct to the end of 2008.

Career highlights
- Leading Goalkicker: Bernie Naylor Medal (WAFL): 1991; Brisbane Bears (AFL): 1992

John Hutton (born 28 May 1966) is a former Australian rules football player in the Australian Football League with the Brisbane Bears, Sydney Swans and the Fremantle Football Club.

Taken as #1 pick by Brisbane in the 1991 AFL draft from the Claremont Football Club in Western Australia, Hutton was touted as being a highly talented full-forward prospect fresh from having completed a West Australian Football League where he won the Bernie Naylor Medal as the league's leading goalkicker with 100 goals.

As a Bear he is best remembered for his role kicking 8 goals in the Bears final game at Carrara Stadium vs Sydney Swans in Round 23, 1992 as well as for wearing a helmet during games for much of his playing career. He also kicked 8 goals against Geelong Football Club in round 7, 1992 to win the Brisbane Bears goalkicking award in 1992. Despite that, he was delisted before the 1993 season.

Hutton moved to play for Sydney in 1993, but after only kicking 9 goals from five matches he was delisted at the end of the 1993 season.

In 1994, Hutton played for Palm Beach Currumbin in the QAFL and his performances earned him an AFL lifeline when he was selected by the Fremantle Football Club's inaugural squad as part of the WA zoning rule to play in their debut 1995 season.

He managed to equal his best haul of 8 goals in Round 6, 1995 vs Sydney Swans, but overall failed to impress. Playing for only one season, Hutton was delisted at the end of 1995.

== External ==
- John Hutton's playing statistics from AFL Tables
- John Hutton at AustralianFootball.com
- John Hutton's WAFL playing statistics at WAFLFootyFacts.net
- WAFL Player Profile
