= Darren Kappler =

Australian rules footballer, born 1965

Personal information
- Full name: Darren Kappler
- Born: 23 January 1965 (age 61)
- Original team: South Adelaide (SANFL)
- Height: 183 cm (6 ft 0 in)
- Weight: 80 kg (176 lb)

Playing career^{1}
Years	Club	Games (Goals)
1987–1991	Fitzroy	87 (51)
1992–1995	Sydney Swans	59 (74)
1996–1998	Hawthorn	41 (27)
Total		187 (152)
- ^{1} Playing statistics correct to the end of 1998.

Career highlights
- Mitchell Medal: 1988

Darren Kappler (born 23 January 1965) is a former professional Australian rules footballer.

Recruited from South Australian National Football League club South Adelaide, Kappler played 187 games for Fitzroy, the Sydney Swans and Hawthorn in the Australian Football League. During his AFL career, Kappler built a reputation as a talented and damaging long kicking left footed wingman. He was also a highly regarded sprinter in South Australia, notably winning the prestigious Bay Sheffield 120-metre sprint at Glenelg in 1985.

After retiring from AFL football, Kappler served as playing coach at the Murrumbeena Football Club in the Southern Football League (SFL) for several seasons before switching first to Victorian Amateur Football Association (VAFA) club Canterbury and then Caulfield Football Club.

In 1999 Kappler spent one season with the Glenorchy Football Club in the now defunct Tasmanian Football League. Glenorchy won the Premiership, their first since 1988. The side was coached by former Essendon player Paul Hamilton, assisted by current Dodges Ferry coach Danny Ling. Kappler flew in, and flew out of Tasmania, never training with the club.

Kappler's brother David Kappler played over 200 games for South Adelaide.
