= List of people educated at Haileybury (Melbourne) =

This is a list of notable former students of the school Haileybury in Keysborough, Brighton and Berwick, Victoria, Australia. They are known in the school as "Old Haileyburians".

== Academia ==
- Roderick Weir Home (born 1939) - Professor of History and Philosophy of Science at The University of Melbourne and Fellow of the Australian Academy of the Humanities

== Clergy ==
- Gregor Henderson - Ordained minister and former president of the Uniting Church in Australia

== Media, entertainment and the arts ==
- Rahart Adams (born 1996) – actor
- Adam Elliot – Academy Award-winning animation artist
- William Franklyn (born 1925) – Actor and voice artist
- Ian Henderson (born 1953) – Anchorman for the ABC
- Zara McDonald - Co-creator and co-host of podcast Shameless
- Robert Menzies (born 1955) - actor
- Khanh Ong - Cook and television personality

== Law ==
- Sir Wilfred Fullagar (1892-1961) – Justice of the High Court of Australia and Knight Commander of the Order of the British Empire
- Lex Lasry (born 1948) – Judge of the Supreme Court of Victoria
- Simon Molesworth (born 1954) - Barrister and environmentalist
- Ross Sundberg - Judge of the Federal Court of Australia

== Military ==
- Rupert Downes – Major General of Medical Services in the Australian Army and surgeon

== Politics ==
- Peter Block (1935-1992) - Liberal member of the Victorian Legislative Council
- Ted Hicks (1910-1984) - public servant, diplomat and Department of Defence (1958-1968)
- Tim Holding – former Victorian Labor MLA for Springvale 1999–2002 & Lyndhurst 2002–2013
- Peter McArthur (1937-2017) - broadcaster and Liberal member of the Victorian Legislative Assembly
- Martin Pakula (born 1969) – Former Victorian Labor MLA for Lyndhurst 2013–2014 & Keysborough 2014–2022
- Alan Tudge (born 1971) – Liberal Party of Australia Federal MP for Aston 2010–2023
- Nick Wakeling (born 1971) – Victorian Liberal MLA for Ferntree Gully 2006–2022

== Sport ==
- Karl Amon (born 1995) - AFL footballer for Hawthorn
- Harry Armstrong (born 2006) - AFL footballer for Richmond
- Josh Battle (born 1998) — AFL footballer for St Kilda
- Josh Beaver (born 1993) - Olympic swimmer
- Aiden Bonar (born 1999) — AFL footballer for North Melbourne
- Andrew Brayshaw (born 1999) — AFL footballer for Fremantle
- Angus Brayshaw (born 1996) — retired AFL footballer, Melbourne
- Hamish Brayshaw (born 1998) - WAFL footballer for East Perth
- Alice Burke (born 2002) – AFLW footballer for St Kilda
- Russell Butler (born 1968) — Olympic diver
- Stuart Carruthers (born 1970) - Olympic field hockey player
- Oscar Clavarino (born 1999) - SANFL footballer for South Adelaide
- Kieran Collins (born 1997) - former AFL footballer for the Western Bulldogs
- Charlie Constable (born 1999) — WAFL footballer for Perth
- Paul Corrigan (born 1977), former AFL footballer for Geelong
- Luke Davies-Uniacke (born 1999) — AFL footballer for North Melbourne
- Isabella Eddey (born 2002) — AFLW footballer for North Melbourne
- Stuart Edwards (born 1972) — former AFL footballer for Richmond
- Nathan Ephraums (born 1999) — field hockey player for Bloemendaal and the Australia national team
- Robin Fildes (born 1940) - former AFL footballer for Collingwood
- Nathan Freeman (born 1995) - AFL footballer for St Kilda
- Jack Gunston (born 1991) — AFL footballer for Hawthorn
- Gerry Hazlitt (1888-1915) - cricketer for the Australia national team
- Ian Herman (born 1965) - former AFL footballer for Carlton and Richmond
- Jon Holland (born 1987) - former cricketer for the Australia national team
- Val Holten (1927-2015) - cricketer who played for Victoria
- Paul Hopgood (born 1973) - former AFL footballer for Melbourne
- Taj Hotton (born 2006) - AFL footballer for Richmond
- Jack Hutchins (born 1992) — former AFL footballer for Gold Coast
- Ben King (born 2000) — AFL footballer for Gold Coast
- Max King (born 2000) — AFL footballer for St Kilda
- Amy Lawton (born 2002) — field hockey player for THC Hurley and the Australia national team
- Josie Lawton (born 2004) - field hockey player for Melbourne and the Australia national team
- Stewart Loewe (born 1968) - former AFL footballer for St Kilda
- Tom Lynch (born 1990) - former AFL footballer for St Kilda, Adelaide and North Melbourne
- Connor Macdonald (born 2003) - AFL footballer for Hawthorn
- John Marshall (born 1930) - Olympic swimmer
- Stefan Martin (born 1986) — former AFL footballer for Melbourne, Brisbane and Western Bulldogs
- Cameron McFadzean (born 1971) - Olympic canoeist
- Jarred Moore (born 1986) - former AFL footballer for Sydney
- Brett Moyle (born 1980) — former AFL footballer for St Kilda
- Victoria Na (born 1991) — Olympic badminton player for Australia
- Steven O'Dor (born 1987) — former soccer player for South Melbourne, Wellington and the Young Socceroos
- James Pattinson (born 1990) — former cricketer for Melbourne and the Australian national team
- Oscar Piastri (born 2001) — Formula 1 driver for McLaren
- Lewis Pierce (born 1994) - former AFL footballer for St Kilda
- Cameron Polson (born 1998) - former AFL footballer for Carlton
- Michael Porter (born 1945) - former VFL footballer for Hawthorn
- Hugo Ralphsmith (born 2001) — AFL footballer for Richmond
- Sean Ralphsmith (born 1966) — former AFL footballer for St Kilda and Hawthorn
- Robert Rose (1952-1999) — AFL footballer for Collingwood and Footscray and cricketer for Victoria
- Archie Roberts (born 2005) - AFL footballer for Essendon
- Laetisha Scanlan (born 1990) — Olmpic sport shooter
- Jack Scrimshaw (born 1998) — AFL footballer for Hawthorn
- Tom Scully (born 1991) — former AFL footballer for Greater Western Sydney and Hawthorn
- Alex Silvagni (born 1987) — former AFL footballer for Fremantle
- Ashley Smith (born 1990) - former AFL footballer for West Coast Eagles
- Liam Stocker (born 2000) - AFL footballer for St Kilda
- Robert Stone (born 1965) — Olympic sprinter
- Tory Taylor (born 1997) — NFL punter for the Chicago Bears
- James Thiessen (born 1974) - former AFL footballer for Richmond and Adelaide
- Ty Vickery (born 1990) — former AFL footballer for Richmond
- Don Wagstaff (born 1949) - Olympic diver
- Cody Weightman (born 2001) — AFL footballer for the Western Bulldogs
- Marcus Windhager (born 2003) - AFL footballer for St Kilda
- Josh Worrell (born 2001) - AFL footballer for Adelaide
- Kaitlyn Ea (born 2003) - Commonwealth Badminton Player for Australia

== Other ==
- Alan Newton (1887-1949) - surgeon
- David Prior - entrepreneur and owner of Bladnoch since 2015
- Basil George Watson (1893-1917) – pioneer Australian aviator

== See also ==
- List of schools in Victoria
- List of high schools in Victoria
- List of largest Victorian Schools
- Associated Public Schools of Victoria
