= Haileybury =

Haileybury may refer to:

== Australia ==
- Haileybury (Melbourne), a school in Melbourne, Victoria, Australia
  - Haileybury Rendall School, an offshoot in Berrimah, Northern Territory, Australia

== China ==
- Haileybury International School, an international school in Tianjin.

== Canada ==
- Haileybury, Ontario, part of Temiskaming Shores, a city in Ontario
- Haileybury School of Mines, a school of Northern College, Ontario

== Kazakhstan ==
- Haileybury Almaty, an independent school in Almaty, an offshoot of Haileybury College (UK)
- Haileybury Astana, an independent school in Astana, an offshoot of Haileybury College (UK)

== United Kingdom ==
- East India Company College, Haileybury, Hertfordshire, England (1806–1858) was the training establishment for the Honourable East India Company
  - Haileybury College, opened in 1862 on the site of the East India Company College
  - Haileybury and Imperial Service College, formed by the 1942 merger of Haileybury College and Imperial Service College
- Haileybury Turnford, an academy in Cheshunt, Hertfordshire, sponsored by Haileybury College
- Lambrook Haileybury, a prep school in Berkshire
