= Old Haileyburians =

Old Haileyburians may refer to the former pupils of two schools called "Haileybury".

- Haileybury and Imperial Service College in Hertford Heath, England
- Haileybury, Melbourne, in Australia
- Old Haileybury Football Club

== See also ==
- List of people educated at Haileybury, Melbourne for a list of old boys of the school in Melbourne
