= Associated Public Schools of Victoria =

School association in Victoria, Australia

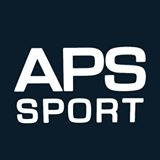
- Abbreviation: APS
- Formation: 1908
- Headquarters: APS House; Hawthorn, Victoria
- Location: Melbourne, Victoria
- Members: Eleven member schools
- Official language: English
- Chair: Philip Grutzner; Melbourne Grammar School (2024–2026)
- Chief Executive Officer: Luke Soulos (2003–present)
- Website: www.apssport.org.au

The Associated Public Schools of Victoria (APS) are a group of eleven independent schools in Victoria, Australia, similar to the Athletic Association of the Great Public Schools in New South Wales, the Great Public Schools Association in Queensland, and the Public Schools Association in Western Australia. The descriptor "Public School" references the historical usage of the term and the model of the British public school.

The first meet of Public Schools Sports was held at the Melbourne Cricket Ground on 30 November 1870 with Melbourne Grammar School, Scotch College and Wesley College competing and winning that order. The Association was established in 1908 so member schools may compete against each other on the sporting fields, the original competition sports were Australian Rules Football, Athletics, Rowing and Cricket.

Students now compete in a variety of sports, which are split into three seasons, Summer, Winter and Spring. Students in Year 7 and above compete on Saturdays and students in primary year levels compete on Wednesday afternoons. Major annual competitions include the APS Head of the River Rowing Regattas, the APS Combined Swimming & Diving Championships and the APS Combined Athletics Championships.

In 2001, the APS and Associated Grammar Schools of Victoria coordinated to form a combined AGSV/APS girls' sport program. This was due to the establishment of Girls Sport Victoria in 2000 after a letter was sent to principals of Melbourne Girls Grammar School, Firbank Girls' Grammar School, Genazzano FCJ College, Loreto Mandeville Hall Toorak, Presbyterian Ladies' College and Toorak College from the APS, inviting them to join their association, which they all refused. The new AGSV/APS girls' sport program was established to provide opportunities for fair competition to female students of schools from both associations. Of the twenty AGSV/APS schools, twelve are co-educational, eight are boys-only and none are girls-only. As such, most of the sporting competitions are dominated by boys and the opportunities for girls' sport are relatively limited in both associations. The AGSV/APS girls competition runs for the Summer and Winter seasons (not applying to the Athletics, Swimming or other sport that is contested outside the main seasons) and is separate from the boys competition, which remains APS-only.

In March 2005, the APS member schools formed a set of guidelines regarding the awarding of sporting scholarships to students, following criticism of recruiting practices employed by some schools. The headquarters of the APS is known as APS House and is located on Church Street in Hawthorn, Victoria.

== Schools ==
=== Current member schools ===
School	Location	Principal	Enrolment	Founded	Denomination	Boys/girls	Day/boarding	Year entered competition	School colours
Brighton Grammar School	Brighton	Ross Featherston	1,500	1882	Anglican	Boys	Day	1958	Navy and red
Carey Baptist Grammar School	Kew, Donvale	Jonathan Walter	2,600	1923	Baptist	Boys & Girls	Day	1958	Black, blue and gold
Caulfield Grammar School	Caulfield, Malvern, Wheelers Hill, Yarra Junction, Nanjing	Ashleigh Martin	3,600	1881	Anglican	Boys & Girls	Day & Boarding	1958	Navy and white
The Geelong College	Newtown, Geelong	Simon Young	1,500	1861	Associated with the Uniting Church	Boys & Girls	Day & Boarding	1908	Dark green, white and navy
Geelong Grammar School	Corio, Geelong, Toorak, Timbertop	Rebecca Cody	1,500	1855	Anglican	Boys & Girls	Day & Boarding	1900	Eton blue
Haileybury	Brighton, Berwick, Keysborough, City, Tianjin, Darwin	Derek Scott	4,600	1892	Previously associated with the Uniting Church	Boys & Girls	Day & Boarding	1958	Magenta, black and gold
Melbourne Grammar School	Melbourne, Caulfield	Philip Grutzner	1,900	1858	Anglican	Boys	Day & Boarding	1900	Oxford blue
St Kevin's College	Toorak, Richmond	Deborah Barker	2,120	1918	Roman Catholic	Boys	Day	1958	Green, gold and navy
Scotch College	Hawthorn	Scott Marsh	1,870	1851	Presbyterian	Boys	Day & Boarding	1900	Red, gold and navy
Wesley College	Melbourne, Glen Waverley, Elsternwick	Nicholas Evans	3,400	1866	Associated with the Uniting Church	Boys & Girls	Day & Boarding	1900	Purple and gold
Xavier College	Kew Brighton	Lee MacMaster	1,600	1872	Roman Catholic	Boys	Day & Boarding	1900	Red and black

== Sports ==
Boys

- Athletics
- Australian Rules Football
- Badminton
- Basketball
- Cricket
- Cross Country
- Diving (since 2015)
- Futsal
- European Handball
- Gymnastics
- Hockey
- Rowing
- Rugby (VSRU runs this competition)
- Sailing
- Soccer
- Squash
- Swimming & Diving (combined with Diving from 1998 to 2015)
- Table Tennis
- Tennis
- Touch Football
- Volleyball
- Water Polo

Girls

- Athletics
- Australian Rules Football
- Badminton
- Basketball
- Cross Country
- Diving (since 2015)
- Gymnastics
- Hockey
- Netball
- Rowing
- Soccer
- Softball
- Swimming & Diving (combined with Diving from 1998 to 2015)
- Tennis
- Touch Football
- Volleyball
- Water Polo

=== Combined Sports ===
Students from the Association's member schools participate in a number of Combined Sports (Championship Carnivals) during the year including Swimming, Diving, Rowing and Athletics.

== The APS Regatta (Heads of the River) ==
The Victorian Head of the River race is contested between the eleven APS schools, the race is usually the last race of the official APS rowing season and has recently been rowed on Lake Nagambie which is a full buoyed international standard course allowing six boat finals. Girls from the APS also participate in the Head of the Schoolgirls regatta, where they compete with schools from other Associations including Girls Sport Victoria (GSV) etc.

== See also ==
- List of schools in Victoria, Australia
