= Derek Scott =

Derek Scott may refer to:

- Derek Scott (athlete) (born 1985), American distance runner and coach
- Derek Scott (cricketer) (born 1964), New Zealand cricketer
- Derek Scott (curler), Scottish curler
- Derek Scott (footballer) (born 1958), English former professional footballer
- Derek Scott (music director) (1921–2006), English musical director and composer
- Derek Scott (political adviser) (1947–2012), British economist and adviser to Tony Blair
- Derek Scott Jr., American stock car racing driver
