= Val Holten =

Australian cricketer (1927–2015)

Personal information
- Full name: Charles Valentine Holten
- Born: 15 September 1927; Brighton, Victoria, Australia
- Died: 14 January 2015 (aged 87); Melbourne, Victoria, Australia

Domestic team information
- Years: Team
- 1950/51–1952/53: Victoria

Career statistics
Competition	First-class
Matches	5
Runs scored	170
Batting average	21.25
100s/50s	0/1
Top score	59*
Balls bowled	176
Wickets	2
Bowling average	45.00
5 wickets in innings	0
10 wickets in match	0
Best bowling	1/11
Catches/stumpings	4/–
- Source: CricInfo, 30 August 2022

Charles Valentine "Val" Holten (15 September 1927 – 14 January 2015) was an Australian cricketer who played five first class cricket matches for Victoria between 1950–51 and 1952–53. Born in Brighton, a suburb of Melbourne, Holten was a right hand batsman and right arm medium pace bowler who bowled inswingers. He was considered "one of the State's most useful cricketers."

Holten attended Hailebury College and Melbourne Grammar, and first played District cricket with Melbourne Cricket Club in 1947–48. After two seasons with Melbourne, he moved to Prahran Cricket Club where he played another eight seasons; topping the District cricket averages in his first season and five seasons later topping the aggregate.

Holten later joined the Sub-District club of Malvern. A dispute over coaching fees five seasons later saw him move to sub-district rivals Oakleigh. Highly successful at sub-district level, Holten was made an inaugural member of the Victorian Sub-District Cricket Association (VSDCA) Hall of Fame in 2007 and in 2014 was appointed a Legend of the VSDCA.

== Personal life ==
He married Dorothy Porter in 1952. He died at Melbourne in 2015 aged 87.
