= University House, Australian National University =

Oldest residential college at ANU

University House
- Australian National University
- Location: Balmain Crescent, Australian National University, Canberra 0200, Australia
- Coordinates: 35.284°S 149.118°E
- Established: 1954
- Status: Self-catered, co-educational
- Master: Peter Kanowski
- Postgraduates: 60
- Website: unihouse.anu.edu.au

University House at the Australian National University (ANU) is the oldest residential college in ANU. It opened in 1954 for the faculty, staff, and postgraduate students of ANU.

University House is also listed as a heritage site by ANU, the Royal Australian Institute of Architects and the Government of Australia and is a nominee for heritage listing by the National Trust of Australia. University House hosts various functions, a faculty club, and serves as a hotel and residence for postgraduate students.

On Monday 20 January 2020, Canberra experienced a destructive hailstorm which resulted in extensive building damage at the ANU Acton campus, with most buildings impacted, including University House. The subsequent, and otherwise welcome, rain of 9-10 February caused substantial further water ingress.

The storm and rain damaged the roof, electrical circuits, and disabled the fire system of University House. Many public rooms, hotel and student rooms, and some service areas also suffered hail or water damage. The scale of repairs, coordination with the refurbishments that were to begin in 2020, and the need for heritage and building code compliance, together mean an extended period of repair and refurbishment.

University House reopened after extensive repairs in August 2026.

== History ==
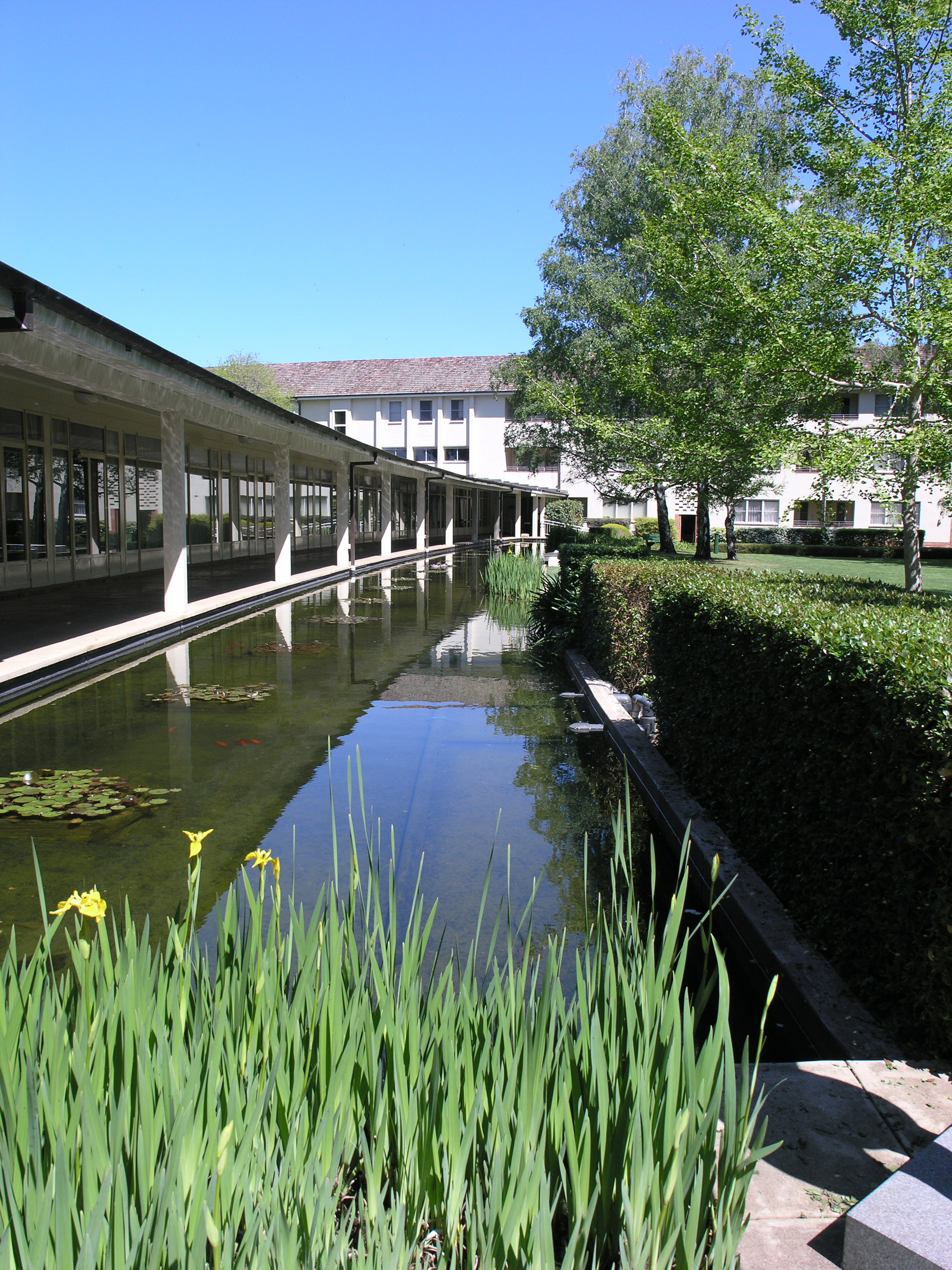
Courtyard pond

University House was first planned in 1947 and was designed by Brian Lewis. Intended at the time to hold the Schools of Social Sciences and Pacific Studies as well as a Faculty Club, library and various accommodations and offices, it was later revised to serve specifically as housing for faculty and students. The foundation stone for the building was placed in 1949. During construction, in 1950, it was decided that the University House would also hold modern art.

The building was ceremonially opened for occupancy by Prince Philip, Duke of Edinburgh on 16 February 1954.

In its early years, initially intended to follow the Oxbridge collegiate system, students were required to attend regular seminars and a daily formal dinner at the hall with the faculty. Since the 1970s this fashion became unpopular reflected by the reduction of students residing at the House. The Oxbridge inspired system was therefore discontinued. In 2001, the House turned parts of the building into hotel to accommodate academic guest, visiting scholars, and general public. In 2002, another residence, Graduate House, was incorporated into the University House system although separate routine and daily administration including its identity and admission remain mostly untouched.

Traditional Oxbridge formal dinners are available for members, students and faculty every Wednesday evening (so called "House Dinner") during semester time however the formality of dress is considerably relaxed to its least degree.

University House has been the residence of many notable people, including Gough Whitlam, who moved in for a brief period in 1975 after his removal from the office of Prime Minister of Australia.

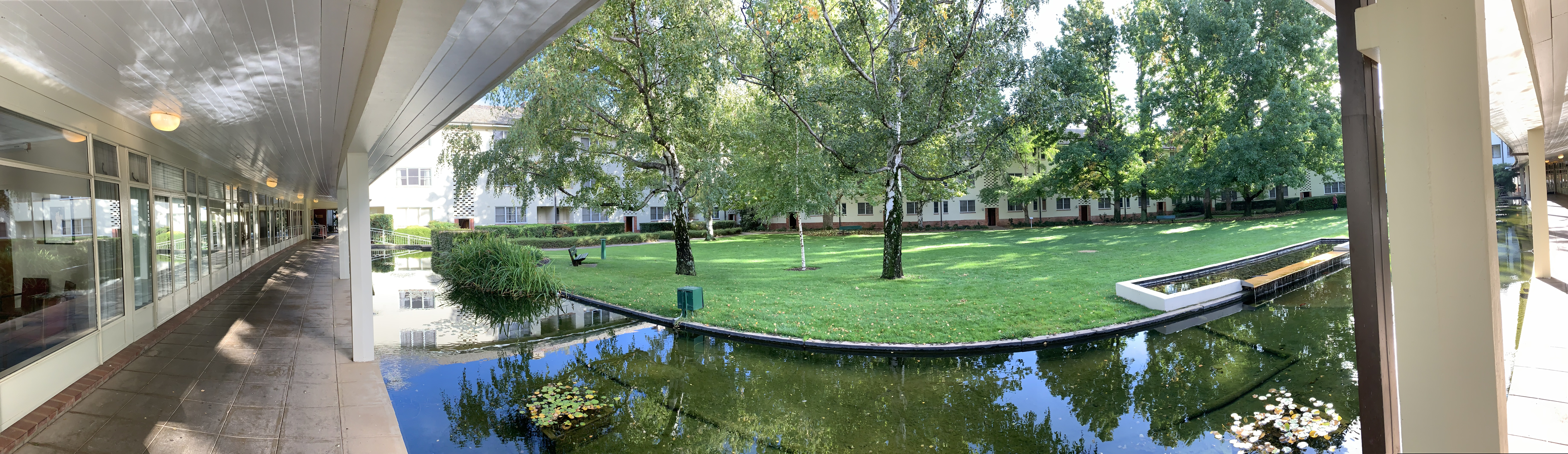
Courtyard at University House

== Great Hall ==
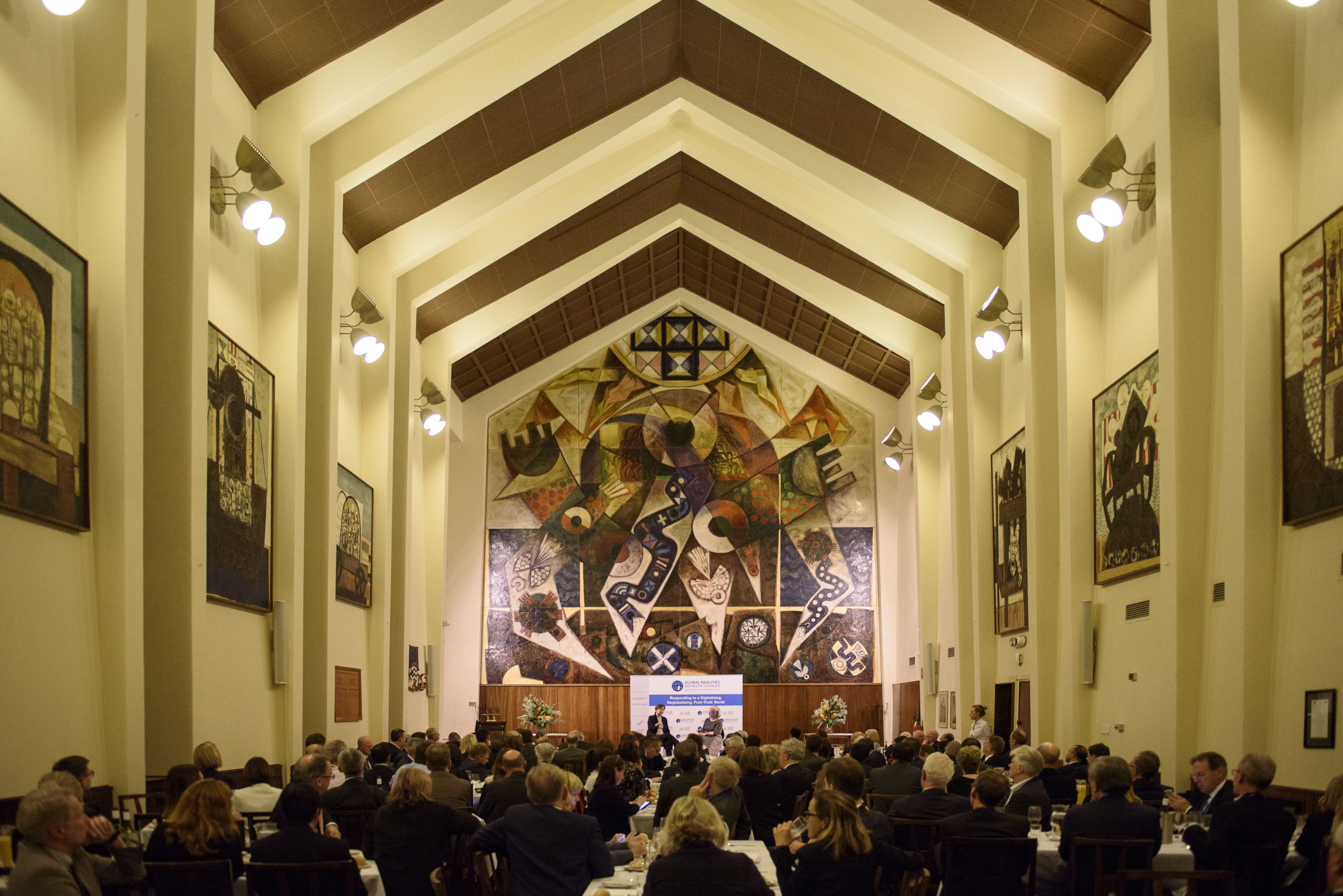
Rostrum end of the Great Hall, showing artworks by Leonard French (Regeneration, 1972) and some from The Journey series (1974).

The Great Hall was originally the dining area for Fellows, although this use has been reduced by the creation of an adjoining restaurant, Boffins.

The hall features are by Leonard French, who decorated the western or rostrum end with Regeneration (1972) and was also commissioned to create The Journey series (1974) of ten paintings that also decorate the Hall.

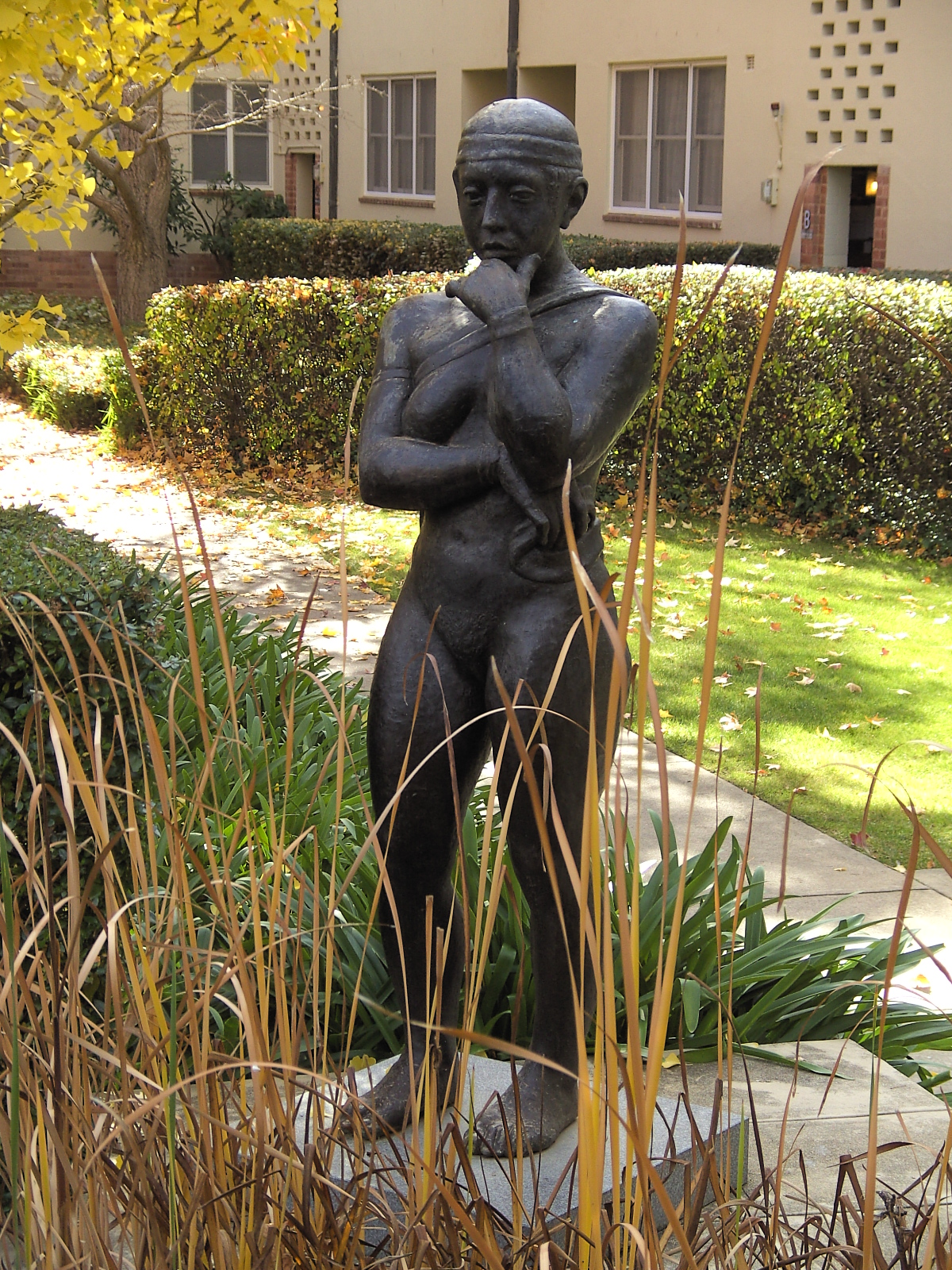
Standing figure (1981-82), bronze statue beside the pond, by former art lecturer Ante Dabro
