= Haileybury Chapel, Melbourne =

Church in Melbourne, Australia

- David Bradshaw Chapel
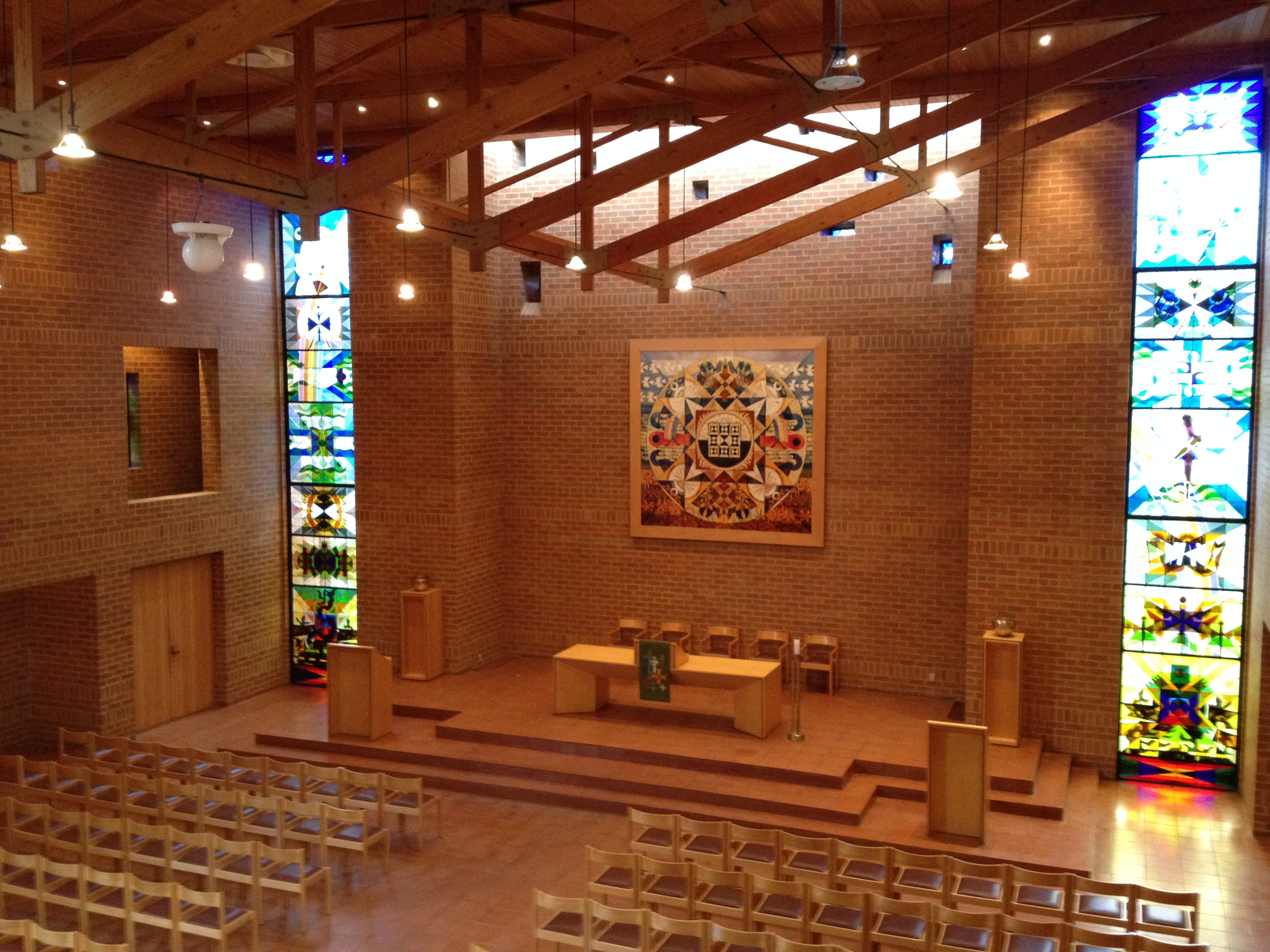
- An interior view of Haileybury Chapel, Melbourne, looking to the sanctuary.
- Haileybury Chapel, Melbourne
- 37°59′40″S 145°08′41″E
- Address: Springvale Road, Haileybury College and Haileybury Girls' College, Keysborough campus in south-eastern Melbourne, Victoria
- Country: Australia
- Denomination: Uniting (since 1977)

History
- Status: Chapel
- Dedicated: 18 October 1987

Architecture
- Architects: Philip Cox (architecture); Leonard French (windows/reredos)
- Architectural type: Chapel
- Style: loosely on the Sydney School
- Years built: 1987

Specifications
- Materials: Brick, timber and glass

The Haileybury Chapel, Melbourne is the chapel of Haileybury College and Haileybury Girls' College, located at the College's Keysborough campus in south-eastern Melbourne, Victoria, Australia. The chapel is located on the eastern side of Springvale Road, just south of the intersection with Cheltenham Road, in Keysborough.

Architecturally and artistically the Haileybury Chapel is one of the finest and most distinctive Australasian sacred buildings from the last quarter of the 20th century.

Designed by the noted Australian architect Philip Cox, the Haileybury Chapel features extensive artwork, including over fifty stained glass mosaic windows by the celebrated Australian artist Leonard French. The chapel is also noted for its fine acoustic, which is especially suited to musical performance.

== History ==
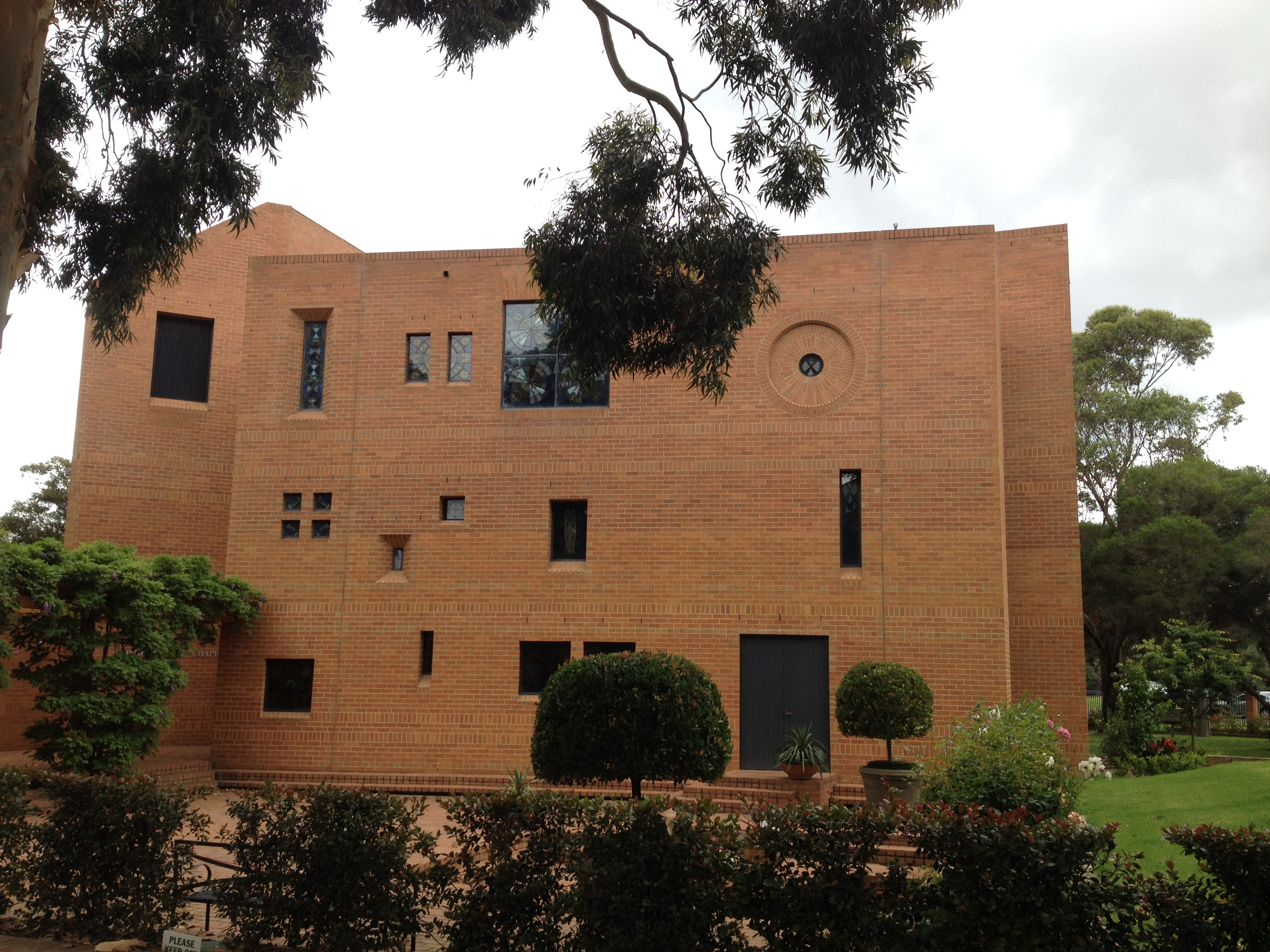
The exterior of the Haileybury Chapel showing the external three storey Ante-chapel wall and Bell Tower to the left.

The chapel was officially opened by the Governor of Victoria, His Excellency Davis McCaughey, on 18 October 1987. The Chapel was named the David Bradshaw Chapel on 13 August 2000, after David M. Bradshaw, the Headmaster of Haileybury from 1954 to 1973.

== Design and architecture ==
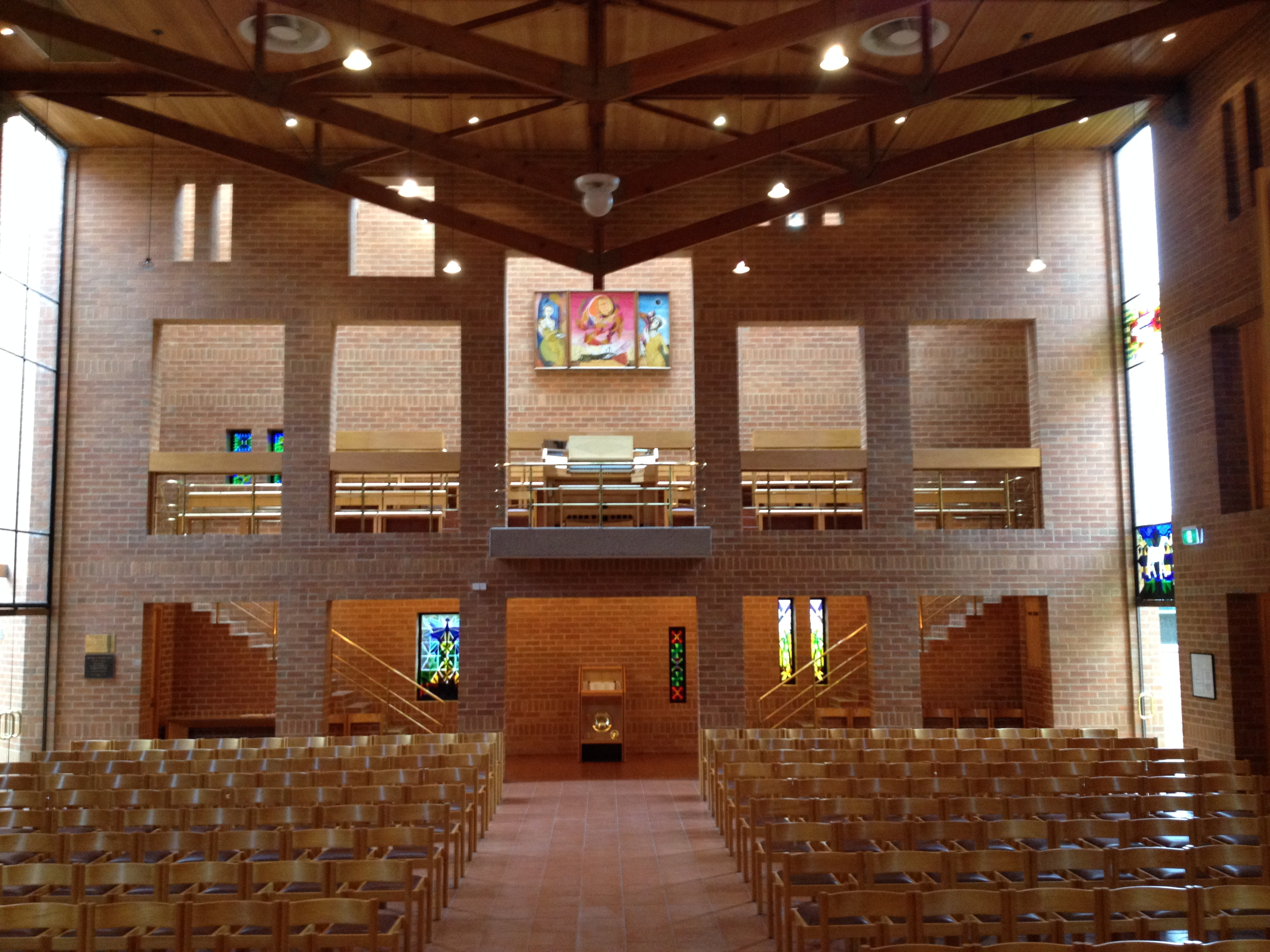
View to the Choir Gallery in the eastern wall, one of the four independent walls in the building.

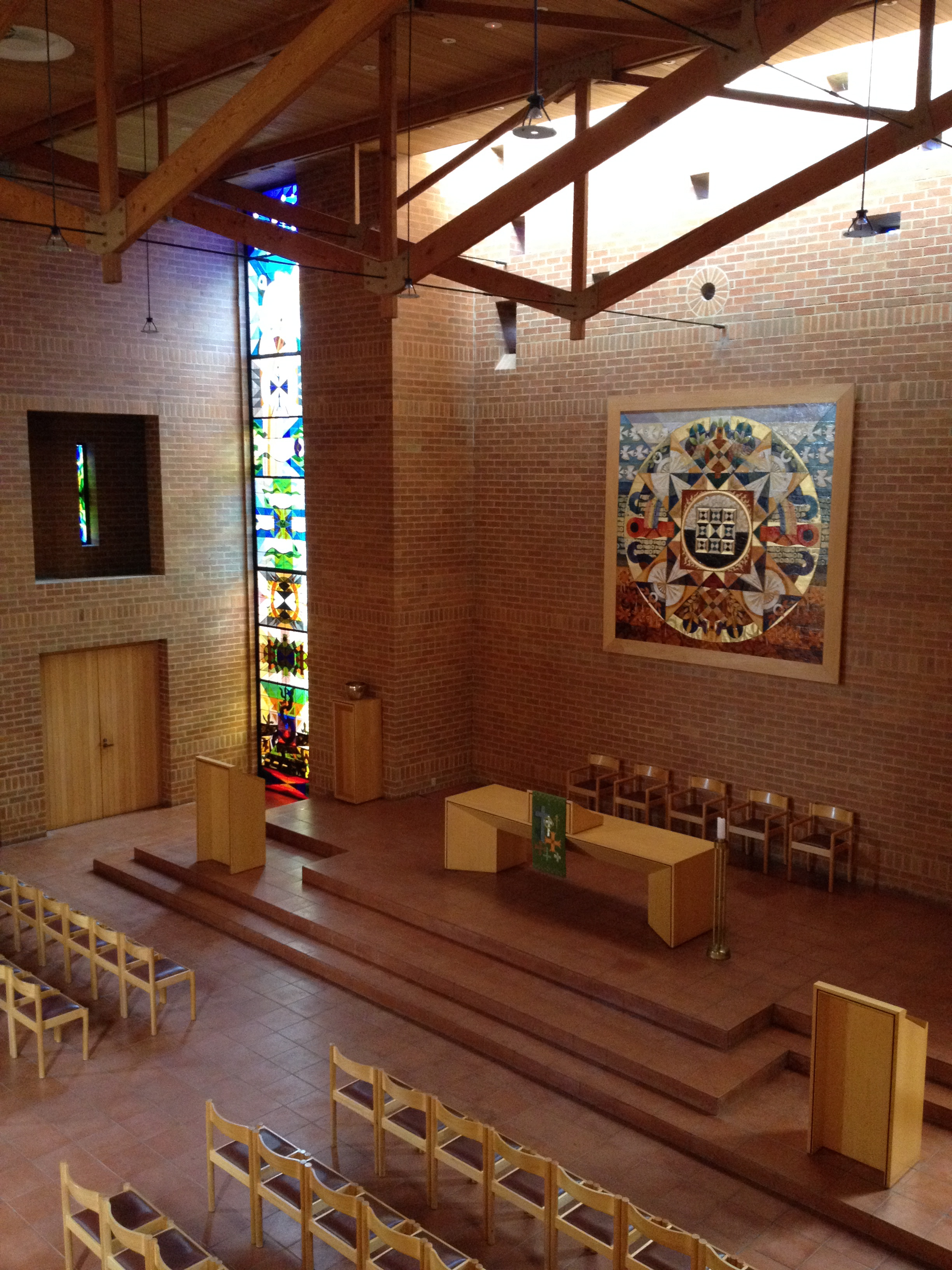
View across the Sanctuary showing the recessed sanctuary wall and exposed timber trusses below the ceiling.

The Haileybury Chapel was designed by Philip Cox, a leading Australian architect. At the time of completing the project, Cox wrote:

"There are moments in everybody's life when contemplation can take place. This may be in the form of a prescribed service with people or it may be a solitary experience. Generally it takes place within an architectural setting. In both cases the architectural space can remove the individual from the trials and tribulations of everyday life and give opportunity to dwell on aspects of philosophy - ecclesiastical or secular. Such a space must respond to the celebration of life and mankind's endeavours, which include the visual arts, architecture, painting, sculpture, stained glass and craft, or the audio arts such as instrumental music, speech, song or symphony as well as producing opportunities for the performing arts of theatre and ceremony.

The vocabulary of the building is in humble brick and timber and glass. However, wherever you look you will see the exuberance of the mason, the carpenter or the artist in his contribution to the art of life.

Haileybury Chapel addresses some philosophical issues. We hope the staff and students who use this building will constantly seek new understanding and meaning of life within these walls and through the architecture and its allied arts be assisted in its interpretation."

The design features four large independent brick walls, each three storeys high, joined with large glass panels and a high timber ceiling with exposed trusses. These walls each feature specific elements of the building: the Ante-chapel and Vestry (northern), Sanctuary (western), Pipe Organ (southern) and Choir with Bell Tower (eastern). Externally, each wall is progressively higher than the other; the northern is the lowest and the eastern, featuring the Bell Tower, the highest.

The building also pays subtle homage to traditional sacred architectural forms with the inclusion of features such as blind arcading and a double-storey Ante-chapel in the northern wall.

Symbolism can be read throughout Cox's architectural design; the Sanctuary wall, for example, has twelve small windows symbolic of the Twelve Apostles. The sanctuary is both raised and recessed, indicating the importance of the communion table, lectern and pulpit. Clear glass above the sanctuary recess, invisible from the nave, floods the wall above the reredos with natural light; this is symbolic of humankind's continual search for the "higher things".

The nave, or main seating area of the Chapel, features a high timber ceiling with exposed trusses symbolic of the upturned keel of a ship. The word nave, from the Latin 'navis' (ship), was historically suggested by the keel shape of the vaulting found in wood or stone in the ceilings of churches and cathedrals around the world; a ship is an ancient Christian symbol signifying humankind's spiritual journey on the seas of life.

== Leonard French artwork ==
=== Stained glass windows ===
Melbourne-born artist Leonard French is best known for his monumental murals, tapestries and stained glass mosaic windows which "grace the façades, ceilings and walls of many leading cultural, educational and spiritual edifices in Australia and overseas." The Haileybury Chapel features one of Leonard French's most extensive collections of stained glass mosaic windows. Other significant examples of Leonard French's stained glass work are at the National Gallery of Victoria, and the National Library in Canberra.

The impact of the socialist Mexican muralists José Clemente Orozco and Diego Rivera during French's early years as an artist was formative. However, his esteem for the French painter Fernand Léger gave rise to his lifelong commitment to the philosophy of art at the service of the common man, and the idea of the struggle and spiritual journey of a hero - a quest which could be applied to all individuals in search of a path through life.

Many of the French's artworks are drawn from literary sources, including The Bible, Homer’s Iliad and Odyssey and most notably, Evelyn Waugh’s biography of the 16th-century English martyr Edmund Campion: eternal legends imbued with the notion of the struggle and spiritual journey of a hero.

The Haileybury Chapel features over fifty stained glass mosaic windows of varying shapes and sizes, rich in symbolism and historical reference. Christian imagery abounds alongside the broader theme of Creation.

=== Reredos ===
The large reredos, hung in the sanctuary, is also the work of French. The ornamental beauty and shimmering luminosity of the textural surface of French’s paintings create a richness of meaning and visual impact. His emblematic use of recognisable iconographic symbols – including the Celtic Cross, circle, dome, serpent, bird and fish – together with a rich layering of paint and glazing, coalesce to form complex works of art of great depth and beauty.

The Haileybury Chapel reredos exhibits French at his finest, and is one of the artistic highlights of the Chapel interior paying homage to French's unique reinterpretation of Mexican muralism. The complementary visual effect of the reredos, combined with the extensive collection of stained glass around the building in an identical artistic style, is outstanding.

== Paccard chapel bells ==
The two-bell swinging peal, with a musical interval of a minor third, was installed in 1988. The bells were cast by the leading French bell foundry Paccard Fonderie de Cloches et Carillons (Paccard Bell Foundry) in Annecy, France. There are no inscriptions on the bells. The larger bell, with the musical note E, weighs 145 kilograms (320 lb) and has a mouth diameter of 596 millimetres (23.5 in). The smaller bell, with the musical note G, weighs 85 kilograms (187 lb) and has a mouth diameter of 497 millimetres (19.6 in). The bells are located in the Bell Tower at the north-eastern corner of the building and are struck hourly and pealed regularly for services and concerts.

== Gallery ==
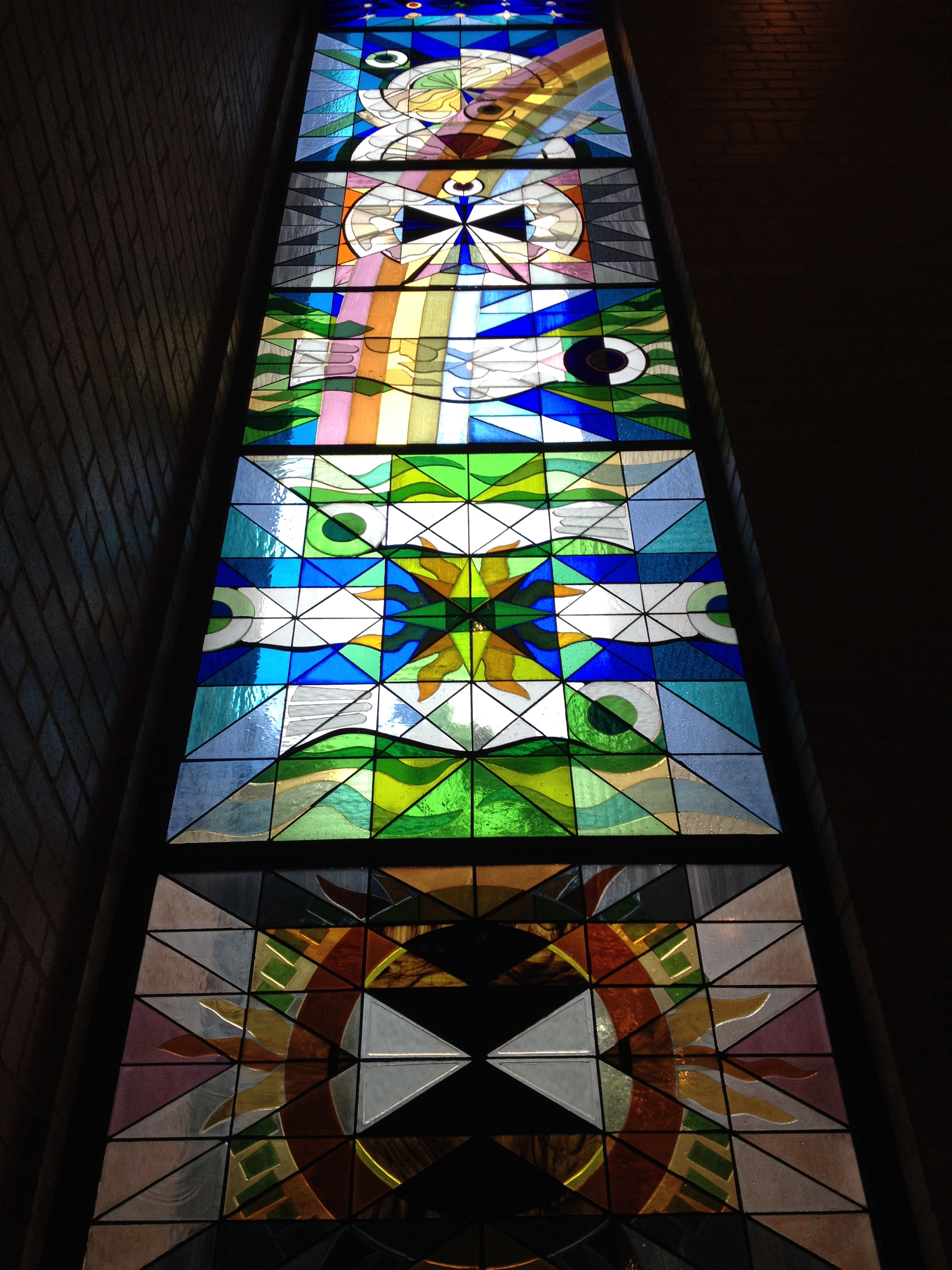
Part of the large Leonard French stained glass mosaic windows on the southern border of the Sanctuary wall.

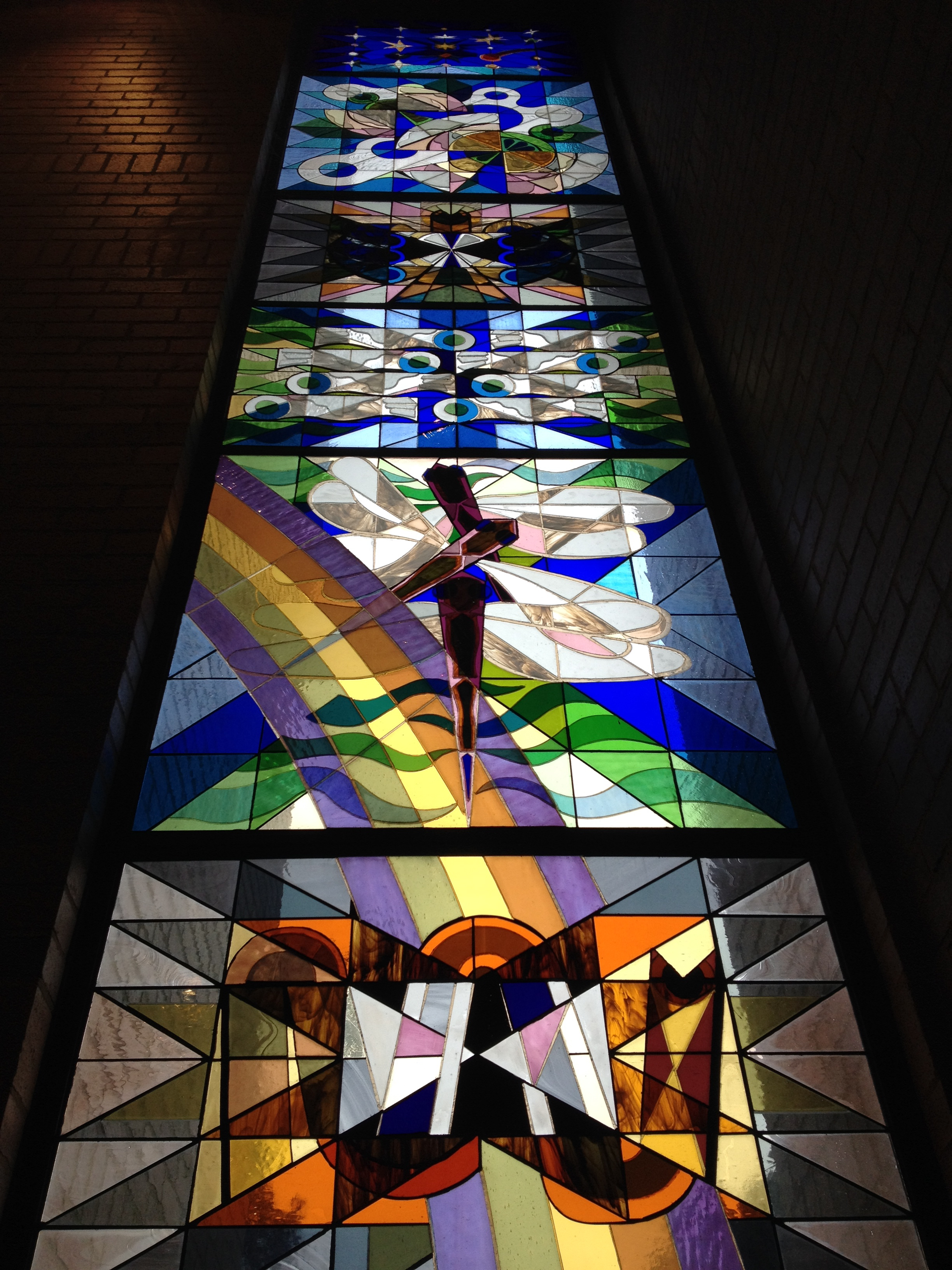
Part of the large Leonard French stained glass mosaic windows on the northern border of the Sanctuary wall.

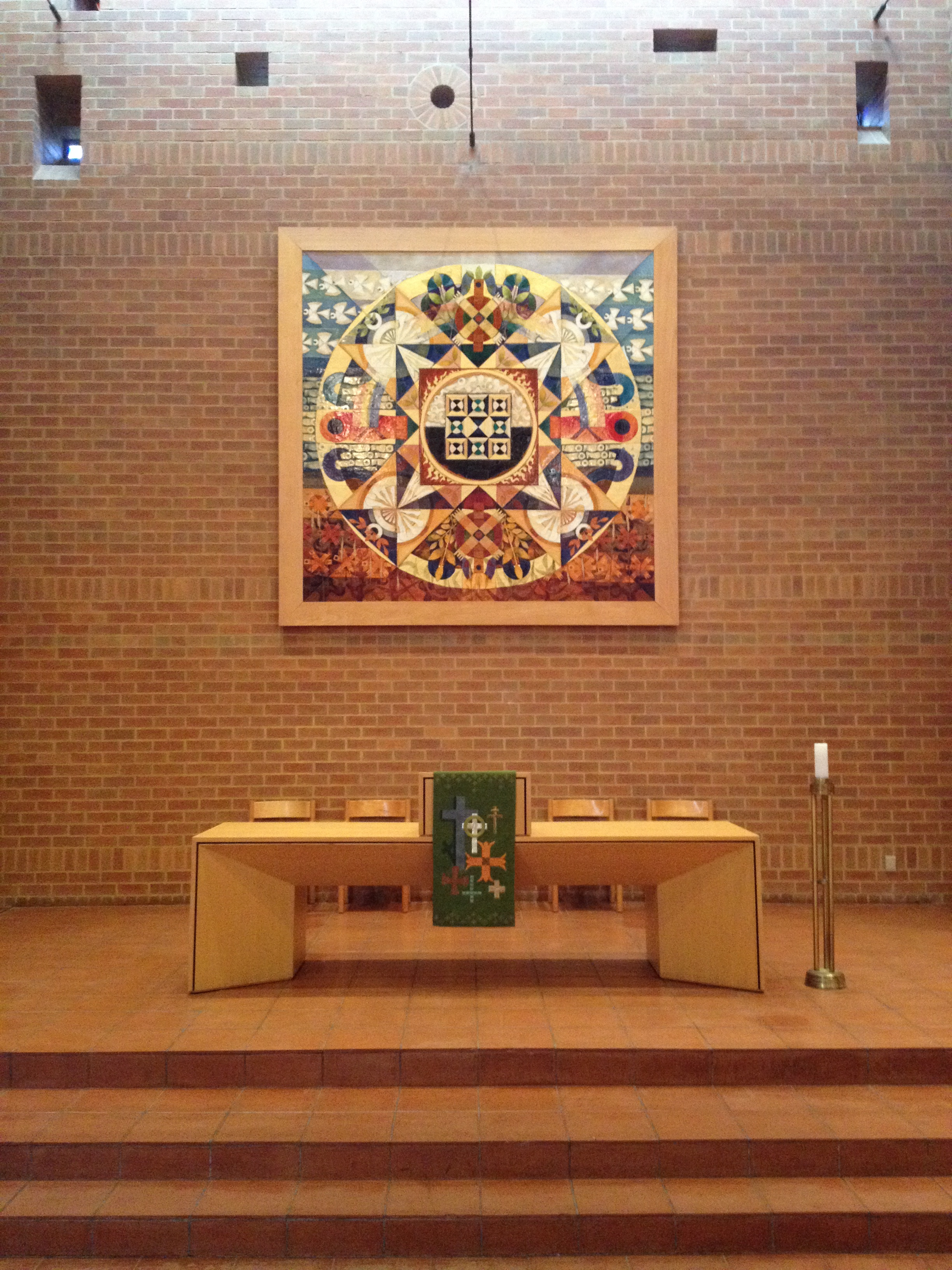
The large reredos panel crafted by Leonard French above the Communion Table in the Sanctuary.

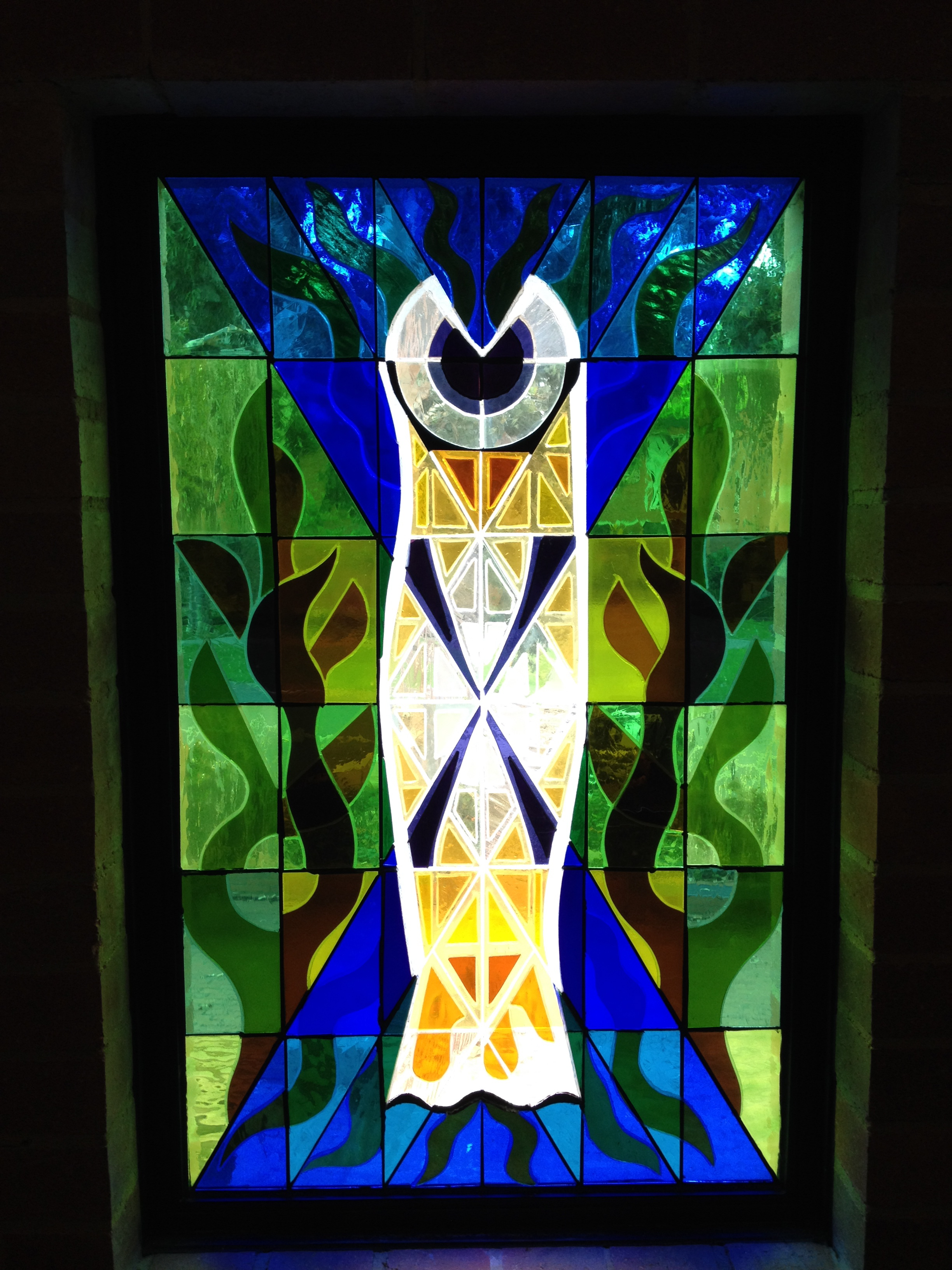
Smaller Leonard French stained glass mosaic window in the upper storey of the Ante-chapel.

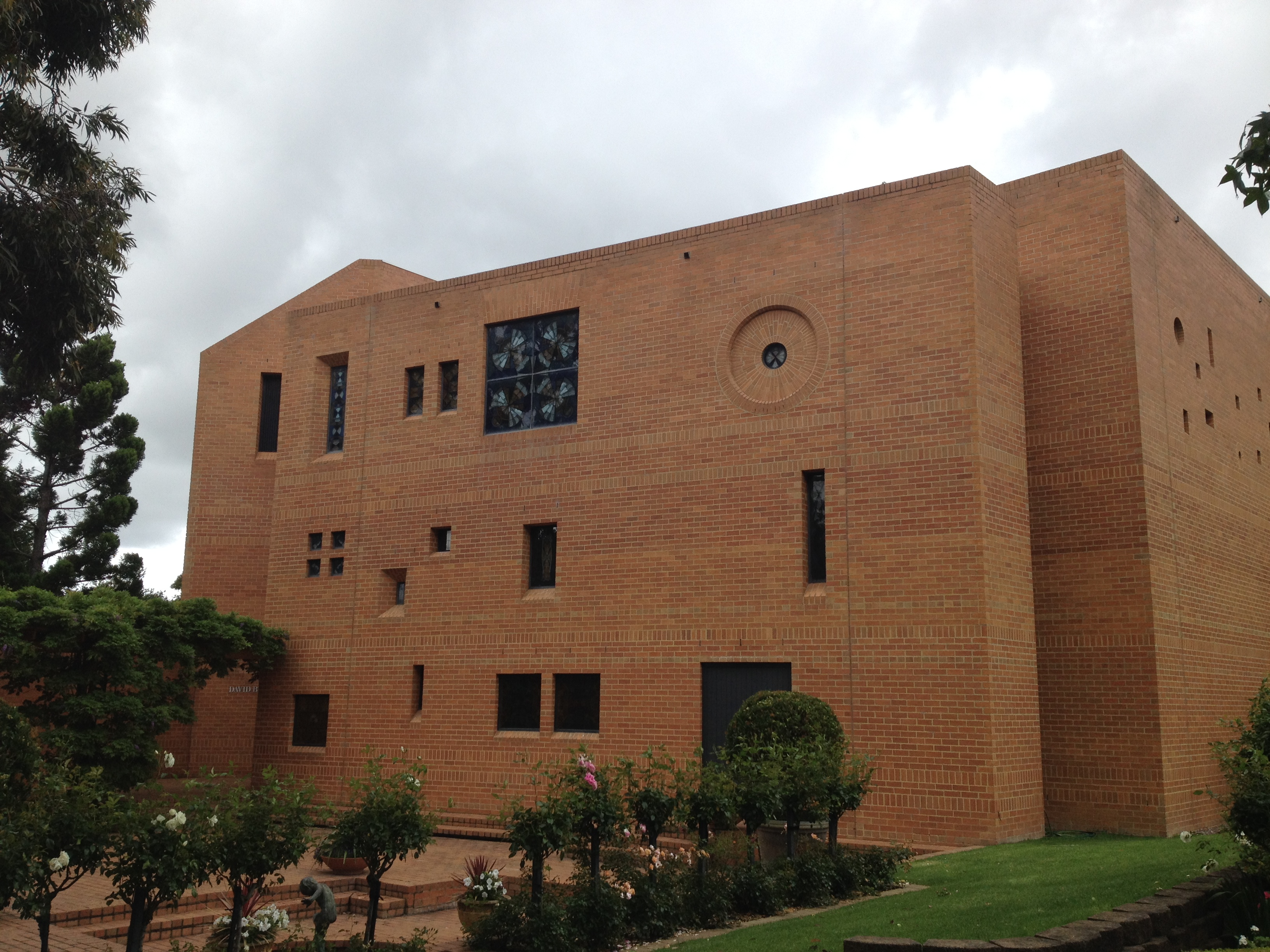
View of the exterior of the Haileybury Chapel, Melbourne from the north-west.
