= Leonard French =

Australian artist (1928–2017)

Leonard French OBE
- Born: Leonard William French; 8 October 1928; Brunswick, Melbourne, Victoria, Australia
- Died: 10 January 2017 (aged 88); Heathcote, Victoria
- Known for: Stained glass windows
- Notable work: National Library of Australia; National Gallery of Victoria; Haileybury Chapel, Melbourne; St John's College Chapel, Brisbane; University House, ANU
- Awards: Sulman Prize (1960); Blake Prize for Religious Art (1963, 1980); Harkness Fellowship (1965)

Leonard William French OBE (8 October 1928 – 10 January 2017) was an Australian artist, known principally for major stained glass works.

== Biography ==
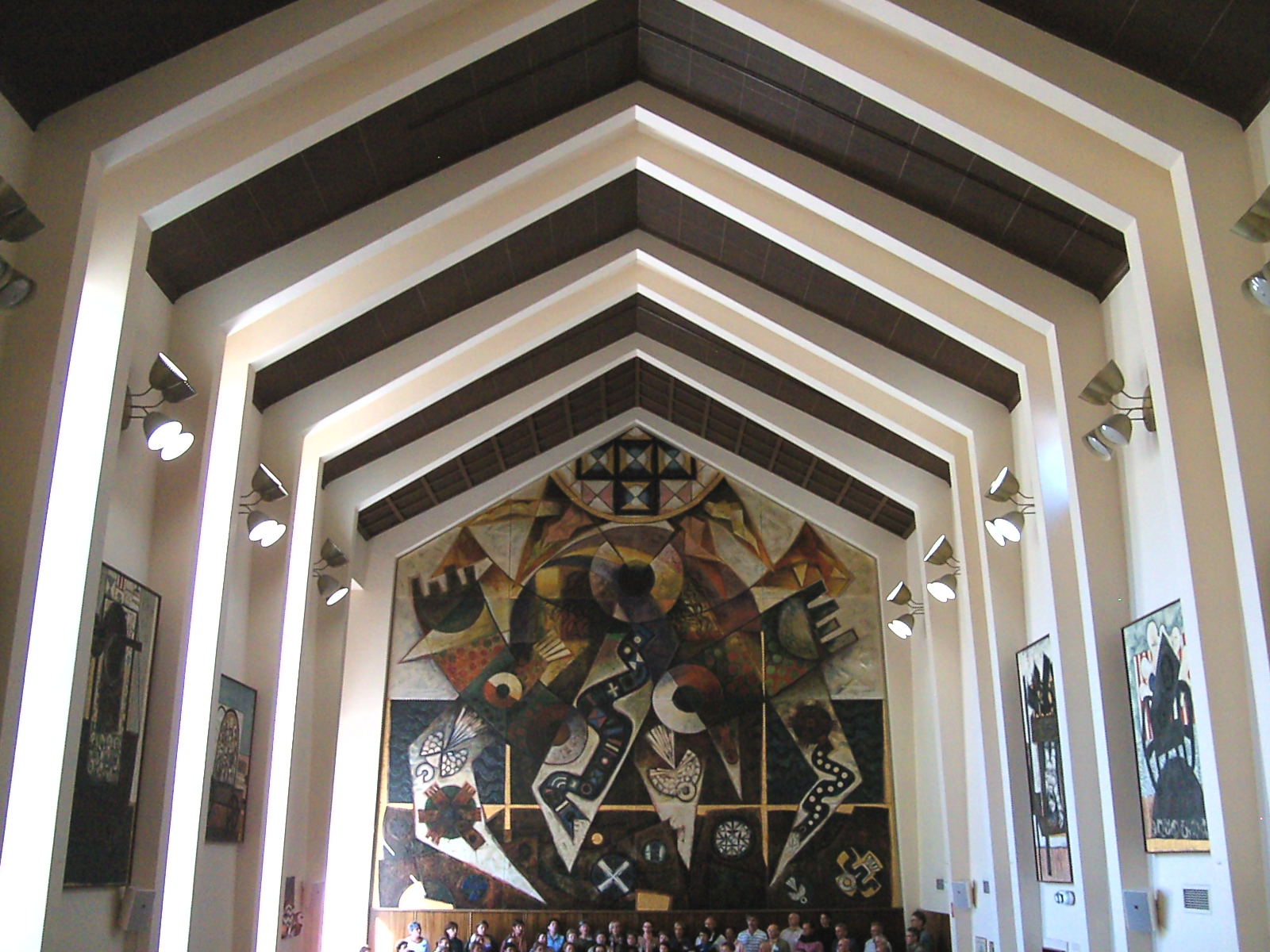
Rostrum end of the Great Hall, University House, ANU, showing artworks by French (Regeneratation, 1972) and some from The Journey series (1974; 10 pieces, all in the Hall).

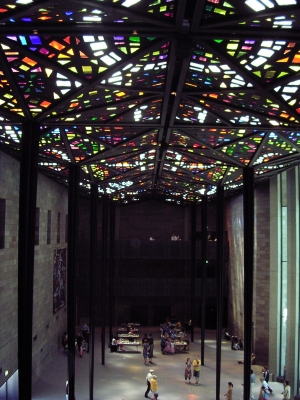
Ceiling at the National Gallery of Victoria, by French

French was born in Brunswick, Victoria to a family of Cornish origin and initially worked as a sign writer.

His stained glass creations include a series of panels in the cafe and foyer of the National Library of Australia in Canberra, and a stained glass ceiling for the great hall at the National Gallery of Victoria in Melbourne, which is one of the largest in the world. Another important piece of work French created was in seven panels, The Legend of Sinbad the Sailor, in 1956. It hung in the Legend Cafe in Melbourne. In 1987, French completed a major commission for the Haileybury Chapel in Melbourne, including dozens of stained glass mosaic windows of varying shapes and sizes and a large reredos. In 2009, Earth Creations, a stacked triptych, was hung in the St John's College Chapel, on the St. Lucia campus of the University of Queensland, two years after it was commissioned.

French's work has been the subject of more than 40 solo exhibitions in Australia, and been part of many group exhibitions outside Australia.

French's advocacy was instrumental in fostering the career of the previously unknown naive artist Sam Byrne, after discovering his work while judging the annual Broken Hill Art Prize in 1960. French introduced Byrne to Sydney gallerist Rudy Komon.

At the time of his death in early 2017, French resided in and painted in his studio in Heathcote, Victoria. He was married three times, and had seven children and five grandchildren.

A biography of French, The Boy from Brunswick: Leonard French by Reg MacDonald, was published by Australian Scholarly Publishing in November 2018.

== Awards ==
French won the Sulman Prize in 1960 with The Burial, and the Blake Prize for Religious Art in 1963 and in 1980. He was also awarded a Harkness Fellowship in 1965.

In the Queen's Birthday Honours of June 1968, he was appointed an Officer (OBE) of the Order of the British Empire.
