= Parallel education =

Parallel Education is a system in which boys and girls in Australia attend the same school, but are split into single sex classes for core subjects such as English, Maths, science, LOTE, and humanities. However, students will come together for drama, music and other social and cultural activities although a strict 30 cm personal space rule applies. Theoretically, this means that students will receive the best education while still being able to interact with the opposite sex.

Haileybury College, Melbourne currently operates Parallel Education at their five campuses with many other leading schools set to follow.
