= Stuart Edwards =

Australian rules footballer

Personal information
- Full name: Stuart Edwards
- Born: 21 July 1972 (age 54)
- Original team: Haileybury
- Height: 196 cm (6 ft 5 in)
- Weight: 96 kg (212 lb)
- Position: Forward

Playing career^{1}
| Years | Club | Games (Goals) |
| 1992–1996 | Richmond | 46 (52) |
- ^{1} Playing statistics correct to the end of 1996.

Stuart Edwards (born 21 July 1972) is a former Australian rules footballer who played with Richmond in the Australian Football League (AFL).

Edwards played his early football at Haileybury and the Richmond Under-19s.

A forward, he kicked 26 goals for Richmond in 1995, from 14 games.
