= David Prior (entrepreneur) =

Australian businessman

David Prior is an Australian businessman who became notable in the yoghurt business. He built up the yoghurt brand five:am from scratch in 2009, and sold it in 2014 to UK-based consumer products company PZ Cussons for $80 million. In 2013 the company employed 65 staff, supplied over a thousand outlets around Australia, delivered 250% increase in revenue over the previous year and won the 2013 "Company to Watch" award.

Before that, he partnered with his father in 1997 to create the sustainable packaging company Baroda, running it successfully for ten years before selling it to packaging giant Visy.

In January 2015 Prior bought the mothballed Scotch distillery Bladnoch and said he plans to resume production from the 200-year-old establishment.

== Background and education ==
David Prior was born and raised in Melbourne, Victoria. David attended Haileybury and went on to complete a Bachelor of Business degree from Monash University. David completed his MBA from Melbourne Business School in 1999.

== Early career – Baroda Packaging ==
In 1997, Prior and his father, Malcolm, built the sustainable packaging company, Baroda. The company grew to large success over the next 10 years and was listed as one of BRW's Fastest Growing Companies. In 2007 Baroda was sold to packaging giant, Visy.

== five:AM ==
With some money from the Baroda sale and his own personal savings, Prior founded organic yoghurt brand five:AM in 2009.

Prior stated that the inspiration for the name "five:AM" was his morning routine, "You know, you get up early, you win the morning. You get up, you do your thing. And, in my case, I meditate, I do yoga, swim or go for a surf or whatever. And by the time you hit your office desk you, you're charged. You're energised."

five:AM became a market leader in the Australian organic food category since its launch in 2011. Products were stocked in Australian supermarket giants, Woolworths and Coles, as well as internationally to South-East Asia, the Middle East and China. In 2013, five:AM won the 2013 ‘Company to Watch’ award. In 2014 Prior sold five:AM to UK company, PZ Cussons for $80m.

== Bladnoch Distillery ==
Soon after the sale of five:AM, Prior purchased Bladnoch Distillery, a 200-year-old Scotch Whisky distillery located in the Scottish Lowlands. Bladnoch Distillery is the fourth oldest distillery in Scotland and the oldest independently owned distillery in Scotland. Bladnoch Distillery is located in the small town of Bladnoch, roughly 140 km south-west of Glasgow. Prior is considered to be the first Australian to own a Scotch Whisky distillery.

After purchasing the distillery in 2015, Prior began the extensive £5m refurbishment, installing brand new distilling equipment and two additional stills. Prior also hired awarded Master Distiller, Ian MacMillan, and the distillery began producing liquid again in 2017.

Prior has launched two brands under Bladnoch Distillery. Bladnoch, the namesake brand, is a line of rare Single Malt Scotch Whiskies, and Pure Scot, a premium Blended Scotch Whisky brand that is highly awarded by international spirits competitions.

== Philanthropy ==
Prior founded not-for-profit organisation, Culture Is Life, in 2015 which aims to prevent youth suicide in Indigenous communities by strengthening Aboriginal culture.

Prior also founded the Prior Family Foundation with his wife, Sallie, which supports projects that work to preserve culture, wildlife, the environment and assist in disaster relief.

== Awards and recognition ==
- Distinguished Alumni Award 2017 – Melbourne Business School
- Commitment to Conservation Award 2017 - Australia Zoo Wildlife Warriors
