= Paul Hopgood =

Australian rules footballer

Personal information
- Full name: Paul Hopgood
- Born: 21 July 1973 (age 53)
- Original team: Chelsea/Haileybury
- Height: 179 cm (5 ft 10 in)
- Weight: 82 kg (181 lb)
- Position: Full back

Playing career^{1}
Years	Club	Games (Goals)
1993–2000	Melbourne	113 (10)
- ^{1} Playing statistics correct to the end of 2000.

Paul Hopgood (born 21 July 1973) is a former Australian rules footballer who played with Melbourne in the Australian Football League (AFL).

Hopgood, a defender, started out at Melbourne in the under-19s and captained the Victorian Teal Cup team in 1990. The Chelsea and Haileybury recruit played 113 league games for Melbourne over the course of eight seasons. His six games in 1994 included three finals. When Melbourne made the grand final in 2000, Hopgood had lost his place in the side, due to a calf injury. He coached Mt Eliza to a premiership in 2005.
