= Bladnoch distillery =

Whisky maker in Dumfries and Galloway, Scotland

Coordinates: 54°51′30″N 4°27′43″W

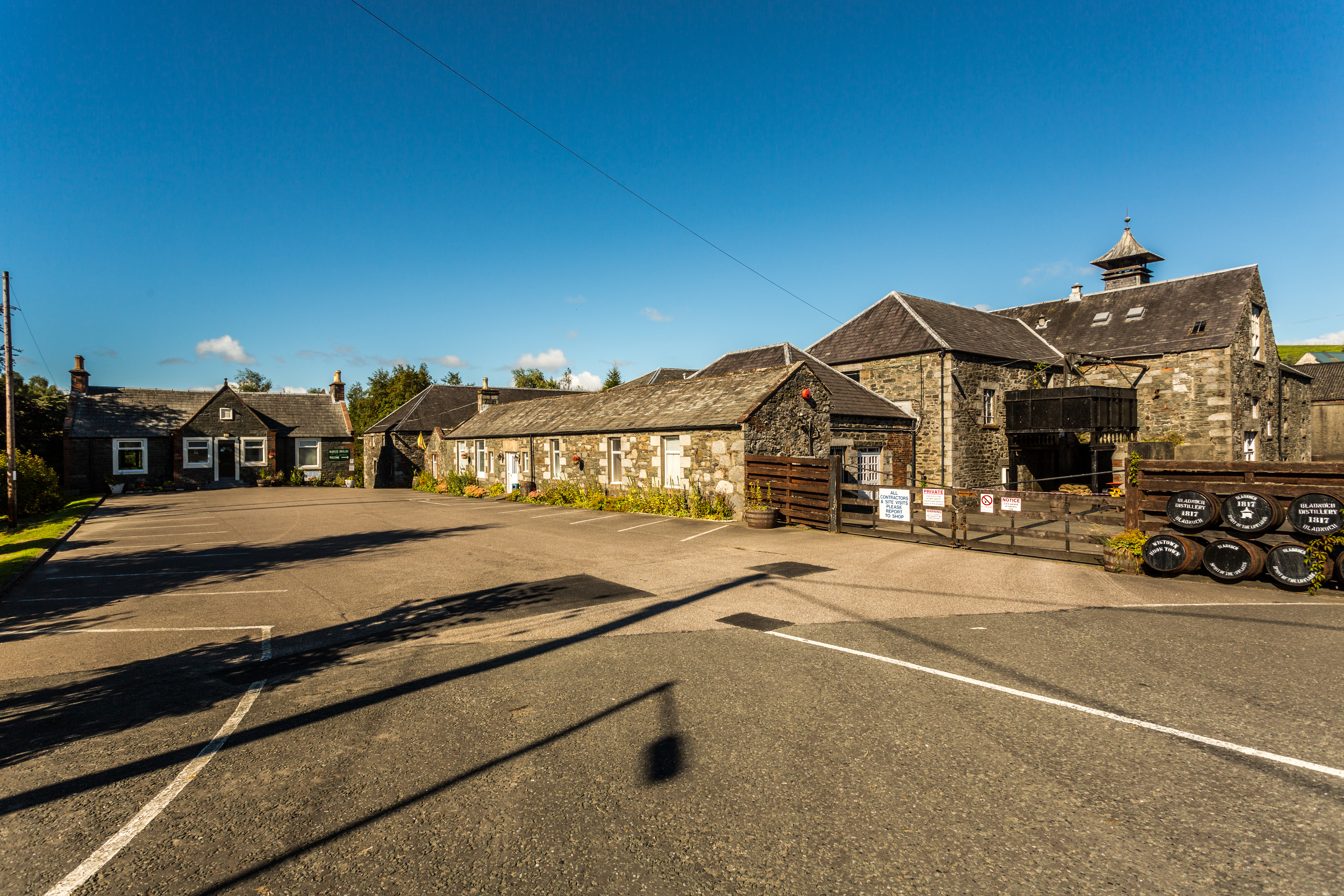

Region: Lowland
- Location: Wigtown, Galloway
- Owner: David Prior
- Founded: 1817
- Status: Operational
- Water source: River Bladnoch
- No. of stills: 2 wash 2 spirit
- Capacity: 1.5 million litres
- Website: http://www.bladnoch.com

Bladnoch distillery is a Lowland single malt Scotch whisky distillery located at Bladnoch, near Wigtown, Dumfries and Galloway in south west Scotland.

The distillery is situated on the banks of the River Bladnoch. It is one of six remaining Lowland distilleries, and is the most southerly whisky distillery in Scotland.

== History ==
Bladnoch distillery was founded by John and Thomas McClelland in 1817 and during the period 1823 - 1826 produced 28,956 imperial gallons (131,640 L) of whisky, an average of 7,239 imperial gallons (32,910 L) per annum, and in the year 1826 - 1827 this had risen to 9,792 imperial gallons (44,520 L).

By 1845 twenty workers, exclusive of tradesmen, were employed in converting 16,000 bushels of barley per annum into spirit. In 1878 the distillery was enlarged and modernised, presumably to cope with rising production. By 1887 the site occupied 2 acres (1 hectare) with a further 50 acres (20 hectares) being farmed by the proprietor, who was the son and nephew of the founders; the output had risen considerably to 51,000 imperial gallons (230,000 L) per annum.

In 1887 the distillery was described, by John Barnard on his tour of distilleries, as:

"A square pile of buildings erected around a courtyard, with all the water used in the works coming from a mill dam supplied from the upper reaches of the river; an overshot water wheel does all the driving power. The Malting House is a mainly stone building 118 by 28 feet [36.0 by 8.5 metres] with a slated roof, the woodwork painted red; it has three floors, the ground floor for malting and the top floors for barley, each possessing a stone step. There are besides, two other barns 95 by 32 feet [29.0 by 9.8 m] similarly arranged. At left and right angles of the court are the kilns each loaded by a hoist, floored with perforated iron plates and heated with peats. On the top floor of the intermediate building there is a Malt Deposit on a level with the kilns and underneath there is the Mill and Grist Loft.

"Also within the quadrangle is the Mash House, 40 feet [12 m] square containing two Heating Coppers holding together 5,700 gallons and a Tun 16 feet [4.9 m] in diameter and five and a half feet deep with stirring gear. Sunk in the bed of the watercourse is the Under bank, holding 3,000 gallons. A few steps up from the yard is the Back House where against the wall are six Wash backs, two holding 6,000 gallons and four holding 3,500 gallons; also a Miller's Refrigerator and the Wash Charger with a capacity of 3,500 gallons. The Still House, the oldest part of the establishment contains three old Pot Stills consisting of a Wash Still of 13,000 gallons and two Low Wines Stills each of 400 gallons.

"The Receiving Room contains three Low Wines and Feints Receivers, the Spirit Safe and a Spirit Receiver holding 400 gallons. Outside there are three Worm Tubs fed from the river and adjacent a Spirit Store containing a vat holding 530 gallons and the Excise and Distillery Offices. There are four Bonded Warehouses ranged round a second courtyard holding 805 casks containing 80,700 gallons. The Peat Shed is supported on iron columns and has a slated roof. In the main courtyard is a small cooperage and cask shed."

During the 1890s "misfortunes" which are not specified struck the distilling industry; these could have been the reduction nationwide in the production of barley, a possible rise in excise duty and the growth of the various temperance movements. The other distilleries in Galloway were forced to close but Bladnoch survived. Between 1911 and 1937 it was owned by Wm Dunville & Co. Ltd, an Irish company, and on the outbreak of World War II whisky production ceased, but malt continued to be produced until 1949 when the distillery closed until 1957.

In 1966, Ian Fisher and McGowan & Cameron bought the distillery and in 1973 sold it to Inver House Distillers.

In 1983, Arthur Bell & Sons took over and initiated a programme of modernisation and computerisation. In 1987 the United Distillers Group took over Bell's and continued the modernisation as a result of which the weekly production rose to over 8,000 imperial gallons (36,000 L), more than eight times the output in 1887.

In 1993, the distillery was closed by United Distillers. The mothballed distillery was discovered by Northern Irishman Raymond Armstrong while on holiday in the area with his family in 1994. Initially intending to convert the buildings into holiday homes for Northern Irish policemen who wished to escape from the Troubles in Northern Ireland, Raymond fell in love with the distillery and his plans changed. After several years spent finding and replacing the old plant and equipment, much of which had been wrapped in plastic in storage since its closure, the distillery reopened for production in December 2000. The first 8-Year-Old Single Malt produced by the Raymond became available in 2009. The company operating Bladnoch was closed in March 2014. The distillery was purchased in July 2015 by Australian entrepreneur David Prior, who had sold his five:Am yoghurt business for £52m in August 2014. Prior is thought to be the first Australian to buy a Scotch whisky distillery.

Bladnoch distillery resumed production in spring of 2017, with much new equipment, including a 5 tone mash tun, six Douglas Fir wooden wash backs, two 12,500 litre capacity wash stills, two 9,500 liter capacity low wines stills, and a steam boiler that will be fueled with LPG. In late 2016, Prior officially relaunched Bladnoch, and announced three new expressions, created from aged stocks by master distiller Ian MacMillan: the no age statement Samsara, the 15-year-old Adela and the 25-year-old Talia.

Bladnoch distillery also produces premium blended Scotch Whisky brand, Pure Scot.

In July 2019, Dr. Nick Savage joined Bladnoch distillery as Master Distiller. Nick has formerly worked for William Grant & Sons and as Master Distiller of The Macallan. Bladnoch distillery opened its Visitor Centre and Melba Café at an official opening ceremony on 11 September 2019. The Duke and Duchess of Rothesay unveiled a commemorative plaque during the ceremony.

== See also ==
- Whisky
- List of whisky brands
- List of distilleries in Scotland
