= Derek Scott (cricketer) =

New Zealand cricketer (born 1964)

Personal information
- Full name: Derek Grant Scott
- Born: 4 August 1964 (age 62); Auckland, New Zealand
- Batting: Right-handed
- Bowling: Right-arm medium
- Role: Batsman

Domestic team information
- Years: Team
- 1984/85–1988/89: Auckland
- Source: CricInfo, 20 June 2016

Derek Grant Scott (born 4 August 1964) is a New Zealand former cricketer. He played 11 first-class and 11 List A matches for Auckland between the 1984–85 and 1988–89 seasons. He has worked as a journalist and in education and in 2008 became the principal and CEO of Haileybury, a private school group based at Melbourne in Australia.

Scott was born at Auckland in 1964 and was educated at Balwyn High School in Melbourne before moving to Mount Albert Grammar School in Auckland in year 12. He went on to complete a political science degree at Auckland University. He played age-group cricket for Auckland from the 1982–83 season and represented New Zealand under-19s in the annual Australasian tournament during the same season. Primarily an opening batsman, a number of good performances in age-group cricket, including an "impressive" century for the under-22 side in November 1984, saw Scott called into the main Auckland side for the 1984–85 Ford Trophy one-day series. He made his senior debut against Northern Districts in January 1985, scoring 21 runs from the middle-order.

The following season Scott made his first-class debut, scoring a half-century against Canterbury at Lancaster Park. He played for the representative side until the end of the 1988–89 season, working as a journalist for the New Zealand Herald whilst a student and in his early career.

Scott joined Haileybury in 2002 and worked as the Head of Senior School from 2005 before being appointed as principal in December 2007.
