= Haileybury International School =

School in Tianjin, China

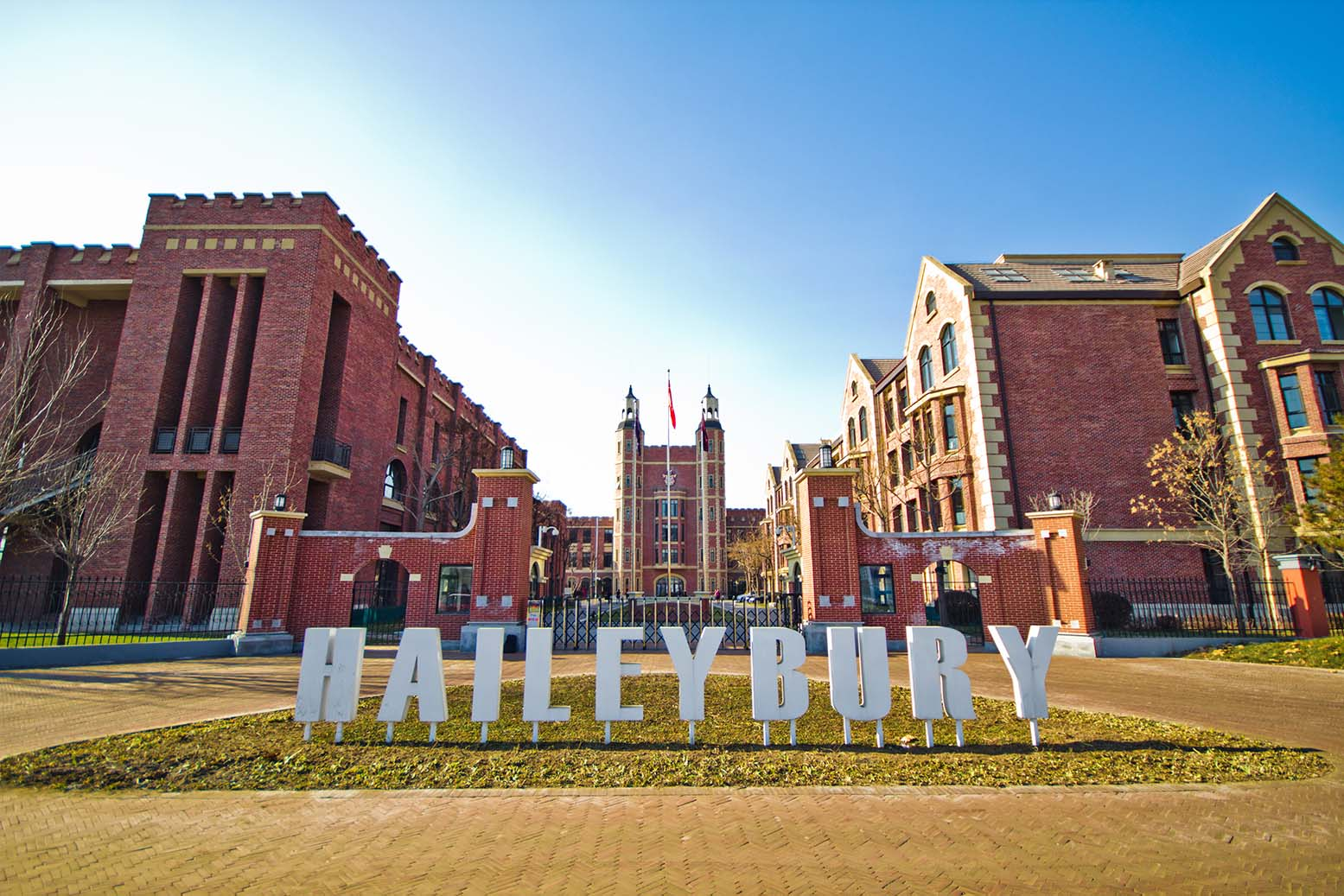
Haileybury International School front gate

Haileybury International School Tianjin (known internally as HIST) is a Chinese educational institution operated by Haileybury College (Melbourne). The school is the first sister school of Haileybury College in Wuqing, China outside Beijing.

== Overview ==
The school was established in 2013 as the first international campus by Haileybury College. The majority of students are Chinese locals and exchange students from Melbourne, with an annual capacity of 1,200 students. There are approximately 85 teachers at the school including 30 full-time expatriate teachers and 55 full-time bilingual teachers of Chinese nationality, 14 of whom hold degrees from universities outside of China. Thirty-six of the teachers hold master's and doctoral degrees. The student-to-teacher ratio is usually around 8:1.

== Controversy ==
Two teachers formerly employed by Haileybury College filed a lawsuit against the school in 2016 for various claims, including assault and deception of a VCE auditor.

== See also ==
- Haileybury College (Melbourne)
