= Haileybury Rendall School =

Location
- Berrimah, Northern Territory; Australia; 12°26′35″S 130°55′21″E

Information
- Type: Independent, co-educational early learning, primary and secondary day school
- Motto: Latin: Sursum Corda (Lift up your hearts)
- Established: January 2018; 8 years ago
- Principal: Andrew McGregor
- Years: Early learning; K–12
- Enrolment: 400 (2018)
- Colours: Magenta and black
- Website: www.haileyburyrendall.com.au

Haileybury Rendall School is an independent co-educational early learning, primary and secondary day school located in the Darwin suburb of Berrimah, in the Northern Territory of Australia.

Haileybury Rendall School has the capacity for 600 students and as of 2018 had an estimated 400 students enrolled.

== Background ==
Melbourne private school, Haileybury, acquired the site on which Kormilda College operated for 50 years. Haileybury Rendall School is classed as the first “tier one” school to launch in Northern Australia. With the support of the Northern Territory Government, Haileybury Rendall School opened in January 2018, including Australia's largest indigenous boarding operation, Haileybury Kormilda Boarding.

The school is named in honour of the founder of Haileybury (Melbourne), Charles Rendall. After Rendall's education at Haileybury College, in Hertfordshire, England, Rendall migrated to Australia and wanted to bring that quality of education to Melbourne, where, on 10 February 1892, he opened the first school in Brighton.

The school is closely affiliated with Haileybury, which has four campuses in Melbourne and one in Tianjin, China.

Currently has more than 1000 students.

== Overview and structure ==
Located in Berrimah, Northern Territory, Haileybury Rendall School uses the Victorian Certificate of Education (VCE) in Darwin, where other schools usually teach with the Northern Territory Certificate of Education (NTCET). Haileybury Rendall operates from its Early Learning Centre through to Year 12 with Community, Social Justice, Physical Education and Arts programs.

=== Aboriginal education ===
Haileybury Rendall School has maintained a core focus on Aboriginal education. Operating for almost 30 years on site, the boarding facilities have had a modern transformation and room upgrade for the benefit of all students. The School is committed to further developing the academic achievement of Aboriginal students.

== Principals ==
Years	Name
2018–2020	Craig Glass
2021–present	Andrew McGregor

== History ==
=== School site ===
In 1941, the site housed an Australian Army Hospital. This period in time also saw the location being used as an Air Defence Control Centre and a Transit Camp for the Australian Army and Royal Australian Air Force.

In 1946 passengers and crew of the airline Qantas would use the buildings on site to break long journeys. This led to the construction of Darwin's first in-ground pool on site, that was used by the Qantas passengers and crew in 1948.

=== Kormilda College ===
Kormilda College logo

In 1967, the property was acquired by the Commonwealth Government for the creation of a post primary hostel and boarding school for Indigenous children in isolated locations.

Kormilda College Incorporated was established in 1968 with 121 students from surrounding Territory communities, pastoral stations and missions. Under the leadership of Principal Graham Benjamin, the school became an independent day school and boarding school for Years 8 to 12 students in 1989. Kormilda College was an Anglican and Uniting Church day and residential secondary college.

A milestone was achieved in 1991, where under Principal Derek Hunter, enrolments reached “370 students and included 100 non-Indigenous students.”

Kormilda College further expanded the school in 2015 with the opening of their Early Learning Centre and Primary School. The day and residential student enrolment exceeded 640, who were in Years K to 12. Those students were representative of the wide variety of cultural backgrounds found in the Northern Territory. Approximately one third of Kormilda students were Indigenous and most of those were residential students from remote north Australian communities. Two-thirds of students were non-Indigenous, and mostly day students from the Darwin and Greater Darwin region.

=== Haileybury ===
With the support of the Territory Government, Haileybury acquired Kormilda College in 2017

In January 2018 Haileybury Rendall School was officially opened by Nigel Scullion and Eva Lawler. The ‘Rendall’ part of the name is to commemorate Haileybury's founder, Charles Rendall, who was educated at Haileybury College, Hertfordshire and set out to Melbourne to later fulfil his dream of bringing Haileybury to another land.

== Controversies ==
In 2018, a student, Jack Fletcher, was suspended due to the length of his hair. Following this, he took the case to the Northern Territory Anti-Discrimination Commission, in where they ruled in favour of Fletcher, and the policy was edited to follow guidelines.
