= Haileybury (Melbourne) =

Independent day school in Australia

Location
- Melbourne CBD, Berwick, Brighton East & Keysborough, Victoria; Australia; 37°59′39″S 145°8′44″E

Information
- Type: private school, co-educational, day school
- Motto: Latin: Sursum Corda (Lift up your hearts)
- Established: 1892
- Chairman: Damon Chudnolo
- Principal: Derek Scott
- Key people: Charles Rendall (Founder)
- Years offered: K–12
- Gender: Co-educational
- Enrollment: 4,686 (P–12)
- Colours: Magenta and black
- Affiliation: Associated Public Schools of Victoria
- Alumni: Old Haileyburians
- Website: www.haileybury.com.au

Haileybury is an Australian private school with campuses in Keysborough, Brighton East, Berwick, Melbourne's CBD, Darwin, Northern Territory and an online campus, Haileybury Pangea. It also has an international campus in the Tianjin outer district of Wuqing, China. Middle School (Years 5-8) at Haileybury introduces parallel education where students are separated into single-gender classrooms for their academic studies and for sport and camping programs. Although learning in separate classes, boys and girls share the same campus and socialise in co-curricular activities. Haileybury has been described as the largest independent school in Australia.

Haileybury is a member of the following associations:

- Independent Schools Victoria (ISV)
- Associated Public Schools (APS)
- Junior School Heads Association of Australia (JSHAA)
- Headmasters' and Headmistresses' Conference

== History ==
Charles Rendall, an old boy of Haileybury College, Hertfordshire (1873) and graduate of Oxford University (1879), moved to Australia in 1882, becoming a teacher of Latin and Ancient Greek at Melbourne University, Melbourne Grammar, and later at Scotch College. In 1892, with five staff and 17 students, he opened a new Haileybury campus in Brighton East, Victoria. The school was based on the traditional English public school model with an emphasis on classical texts of Ancient Greece and Rome, and cricket.

Louis Berthon joined Rendall's staff in 1894. Due to Rendall's continuing health problems, especially after 1906, Berthon was often in charge. Both men regarded a supportive staff/student relationship as paramount.

In 1932 the third Headmaster, Sydney Dickinson (died 1 April 1949), purchased what was then known as the 'Castlefield' Estate, in Hampton, Victoria, and from 1932 to 1939, Haileybury used both properties.

Sholto Black became Headmaster in 1942, by which time 190 boys were enrolled at the School.

Subsequently, David Bradshaw became the new Headmaster and continued the expansion of the school. In 1958, Haileybury was invited to join the Associated Public Schools of Victoria. In 1961 the property 'Newlands' was purchased in Keysborough by the School Council, and from 1963 to 1968 the Senior School operated at both the Brighton and Keysborough campuses.

Michael Aikman later took over from Bradshaw as Headmaster and continued to develop the Keysborough property. During the 1970s the Preparatory School was built on the 'Newlands' site and was to run parallel with the Preparatory School 'Castlefield, Brighton' situated in Hampton. In 1985, land was purchased at Berwick to establish a third Preparatory School.

Dr. Robert Pargetter took over as Principal in 1998. He introduced to Haileybury the model of Parallel Education, a specialised Pre-Senior (Year 9) Program, a broadening of the curriculum, and the three-year VCE.

Haileybury opened its first overseas campus outside of Beijing, China in 2013. In 2019, it opened its first interstate campus, located close to Darwin, Australia, named Haileybury Rendall School. Also in 2019, Haileybury was named Australian School of the Year at the Australian Education Awards.

== Headmasters and principals ==
Years	Name
1892–1914	Charles Rendall
1915–1922	Louis Berthon
1923–1941	Sydney Dickinson
1942–1953	Sholto Black
1954–1973	David Bradshaw
1974–1998	Michael Aikman
1999–2007	Robert Pargetter
2008–present	Derek Scott

== Crest and motto ==
Rendall, an alumnus of Haileybury, England, obtained permission from his old school to use its name and badge. The colours he chose were magenta and black instead of the magenta and white of the parent school; and for the motto he chose 'Altera Terra' to signify the establishment of a new Haileybury 'in another land'.

In 1954, the school decided to couple the motto of Haileybury, England, 'Sursum Corda' ('Lift up your hearts') to the original 'Altera Terra'.

== Campuses and facilities ==
=== Brighton ===
The Brighton campus is commonly referred to as "Castlefield" and was established in 1932 as another component to the original campus on New Street, Brighton. The campus consists of an Early Learning Centre, Junior School, Girls Middle School, Boys Middle School and two Pre-Senior Centres. In 2007, the Senior School at Brighton opened.

=== Keysborough ===
The Keysborough campus was established in the 1960s and consists of "Newlands" and the Senior School.

"Newlands" has been open since the 1970s but has since undergone major refurbishments. The campus consists of an Early Learning Centre, Junior School, Girls Middle School, Boys Middle School and two Pre-Senior Centres. The Senior School was established in the 1960s and has undergone major redevelopments since the establishment of Haileybury Girls College in 2006.

The Keysborough campus houses the David Bradshaw Chapel, a concert hall called "Aikman Hall", a newly refurbished library, a lecture theatre, an arts precinct, and several sporting ovals, hockey fields, and tennis courts, as well as an Olympic size swimming pool with diving facilities.

=== Berwick ===
The Berwick campus is commonly referred to as 'Edrington' and officially opened in 1989. The campus consists of an Early Learning Centre, Junior School, Girls Middle School, Boys Middle School and two Pre-Senior Centres. In 2007, the Senior School at Berwick officially opened. The main assembly hall was named 'John Twist Hall' after the school principal at the time.

=== City ===
The City campus was opened in 2016 and is the newest Haileybury campus in Victoria. It is located on King St, in Melbourne's Central Business District. The campus has been labelled as Melbourne's first vertical school, with the building consisting of ten storeys with two terrace levels. The campus educates approximately 700 students from pre-school to Year 12. The first cohort of Year 12 students graduated from the campus in 2020.

=== Darwin ===
Haileybury Rendall School, named after Haileybury's founder Charles Rendall, officially opened in 2018. The school consists of three components:

- The largest Indigenous boarding school in Australia with around 150 students
- A day school for 600 students
- An international boarding school

=== Haileybury Pangea ===
Haileybury Pangea is a private online school, offering students across Victoria and Northern Territory the opportunity to receive their education online. The Haileybury Pangea experience consists of:

- Live interactive classes
- 2-3 live lessons per subject per week
- Full-time, part-time, and single subject VCE pathways

== Sport ==
Haileybury is a member of the Associated Public Schools of Victoria (APS).

=== APS and AGSV/APS Premierships ===
Haileybury has won the following APS and AGSV/APS premierships.

Boys:

- Athletics (8) – 1981, 1982, 1983, 1984, 1988, 1989, 1992, 1993
- Badminton (10) – 2016, 2017, 2018, 2019, 2020, 2021, 2022, 2023, 2024, 2025
- Basketball (9) – 1993, 1994, 1996, 1997, 2002, 2003, 2004, 2005, 2021, 2024
- Cricket (8) – 1966, 1968, 1985, 1997, 2006, 2007, 2018, 2021
- Cross Country (6) – 1992, 1993, 2008, 2009, 2015, 2019
- Football (11) – 1965, 1970, 1977, 1983, 1987, 2004, 2005, 2006, 2017, 2018, 2019, 2023
- Futsal (2) – 2020, 2021
- Hockey (2) – 2004, 2016
- Soccer (7) – 1990, 1991, 1992, 1993, 1996, 2005, 2006, 2021
- Swimming (3) – 1987, 1988, 1989
- Swimming and Diving* (6) – 1998, 2004, 2005, 2006, 2007, 2008
- Table Tennis (28) – 1995, 1996, 1997, 1998, 1999, 2000, 2001, 2002, 2004, 2005, 2006, 2007, 2008, 2009, 2010, 2011, 2012, 2013, 2014, 2015, 2016, 2017, 2018, 2019, 2020, 2021, 2024, 2025
- Tennis (13) – 1987, 1990, 1992, 1997, 1998, 1999, 2002, 2003, 2004, 2005, 2012, 2015, 2020
- Volleyball (4) – 2015, 2017, 2019, 2020, 2024
- Water Polo (2) – 2018, 2019

Girls:

- Athletics – 2019
- Badminton (14) – 2007, 2008, 2009, 2010, 2015, 2016, 2017, 2018, 2020, 2021, 2022, 2023, 2024, 2025
- Basketball (3) – 2018, 2019, 2021
- Cross Country (3) – 2007, 2009, 2011
- Diving (2) – 2017, 2019
- Hockey (5) – 2013, 2015, 2016, 2019, 2021
- Soccer (7) – 2007, 2008, 2010, 2013, 2016, 2017, 2018
- Softball (2) – 2014, 2024
- Swimming and Diving* (4) – 2007, 2008, 2009, 2010
- Tennis (2) – 2015, 2017
- Volleyball (6) – 2007, 2008, 2009, 2011, 2013, 2017
- Water Polo (4) – 2007, 2008, 2009, 2010

*From 1998 until 2013, swimming and diving events were awarded as a single premiership.

=== Non-APS sports ===
Haileybury also operates a Snow Sports program for secondary students.

== Parallel education ==
At Haileybury, the parallel education system provides education for boys and girls at the same school, and both genders are allowed to interact outside of class times, where mostly single gender classes exist.

== Social justice ==
Haileybury places an emphasis on social justice through their Community Responsibility Program. Each of Haileybury's campuses supports local and global charities, with approximately 40 charities benefitting from the program. As part of their social justice program, Haileybury students seek to raise awareness about the not-for-profit organisations they support, and the work these organisations accomplish, as well as doing fundraising. Haileybury Berwick's Boys Middle School created a campaign in collaboration with Beyond Blue Youth to tackle the issues surrounding youth depression. Haileybury has also implemented various initiatives to advocate for climate change amongst the student body.

== Controversies ==
Haileybury has experienced several controversies over the years. In 2006, complaints were made that Haileybury was poaching top pupils from other schools with financial incentives. In 2013 there was anger among parents and ex-students over the school's involvement in a controversial television comedy - Chris Lilley's Ja'mie: Private School Girl, with one former Haileybury student stating, "We used to be proud of our roots at Haileybury and now to go back and see that they are promoting racism, homophobia, bullying, picking on kids for their weight and size is just horrible... I'm horrified to have any association with this school."

== Notable faculty ==
- Matthew Lloyd, AFL Hall of Famer
- Scott Pendlebury, AFL player

== See also ==
- List of schools in Victoria
- List of high schools in Victoria
- List of people educated at Haileybury, Melbourne
- Victorian Certificate of Education
- List of largest Victorian Schools
