= List of VFL debuts in 1988 =

The 1988 Victorian Football League (VFL) season was the ninety second season of the VFL. The season saw 90 Australian rules footballers make their senior VFL debut and 30 players transferring to new clubs having previously played in the VFL.

== Summary ==
Summary of debuts in 1988
Club	AFL debuts	Change of club
Brisbane Bears	3	7
Carlton	6	0
Collingwood	4	4
Essendon	7	3
Fitzroy	5	2
Footscray	9	3
Geelong	2	0
Hawthorn	8	0
Melbourne	3	3
North Melbourne	10	1
Richmond	11	1
St Kilda	8	3
Sydney	6	5
West Coast	8	1
Total	90	33

== Debuts ==
Name	Club	Age at debut	Round debuted	Games	Goals	Notes
Roger Merrett	Brisbane Bears	27 years, 350 days	1	164	285	Previously played for Essendon.
Scott McIvor	Brisbane Bears	21 years, 238 days	1	138	77	Previously played for Fitzroy.
Rod Lester-Smith	Brisbane Bears	28 years, 330 days	1	39	15	Previously played for Hawthorn.
Warwick Capper	Brisbane Bears	24 years, 296 days	1	34	71	Previously played for Sydney.
Andrew Taylor	Brisbane Bears	22 years, 295 days	4	31	13	Previously played for Footscray.
Rodney Eade	Brisbane Bears	29 years, 365 days	1	30	3	Previously played for Hawthorn.
Michael Kennedy	Brisbane Bears	21 years, 60 days	1	23	3	
Matthew Simpson	Brisbane Bears	21 years, 36 days	7	9	2	
Tony Lynn	Brisbane Bears	20 years, 28 days	9	6	5	
Robert Mace	Brisbane Bears	29 years, 254 days	4	1	0	Previously played for Hawthorn and St Kilda.
Luke O'Sullivan	Carlton	20 years, 138 days	20	62	58	
Steven Da Rui	Carlton	24 years, 12 days	1	55	5	
David Kernahan	Carlton	22 years, 266 days	1	53	8	Brother of Stephen Kernahan.
Gerard Butts	Carlton	21 years, 170 days	6	3	0	
Michael Garvey	Carlton	22 years, 204 days	6	3	0	
Phillip Poursanidis	Carlton	19 years, 364 days	6	3	3	
Damian Monkhorst	Collingwood	18 years, 232 days	2	205	45	
Graham Wright	Collingwood	19 years, 302 days	1	201	107	
Doug Barwick	Collingwood	26 years, 57 days	1	71	90	Previously played for Fitzroy.
Darren Saunders	Collingwood	22 years, 258 days	5	44	2	Previously played for Footscray.
Paul Hawke	Collingwood	23 years, 274 days	1	41	30	Previously played for Sydney.
David Robertson	Collingwood	25 years, 232 days	1	17	9	
Andrew Tarpey	Collingwood	23 years, 27 days	21	9	1	
Tony Elshaug	Collingwood	27 years, 349 days	14	6	4	Previously played for Melbourne and Essendon.
Darren Bewick	Essendon	20 years, 225 days	1	238	332	
Peter Somerville	Essendon	20 years, 2 days	15	160	89	Son of John Somerville.
Greg Anderson	Essendon	21 years, 324 days	1	103	60	1986 Magarey Medallist.
Bradley Plain	Essendon	18 years, 337 days	22	46	89	
Andrew Rogers	Essendon	23 years, 231 days	1	8	1	
Andrew Merryweather	Essendon	27 years, 75 days	1	5	0	Previously played for Fitzroy.
Paul O'Brien	Essendon	27 years, 14 days	5	3	2	Previously played for Melbourne.
Justin Stubbs	Essendon	18 years, 267 days	12	3	5	
Michael O'Sullivan	Essendon	26 years, 123 days	19	1	0	Previously played for Melbourne.
Peter Bourke	Essendon	22 years, 82 days	20	1	0	
Alastair Lynch	Fitzroy	19 years, 302 days	3	120	173	
Paul Broderick	Fitzroy	18 years, 167 days	12	93	80	
John Ironmonger	Fitzroy	27 years, 48 days	1	43	8	Previously played for Sydney.
Andrew Brockhurst	Fitzroy	23 years, 264 days	6	38	0	
Terry Board	Fitzroy	19 years, 203 days	1	15	1	
Darren Louttit	Fitzroy	23 years, 28 days	4	2	0	Previously played for Melbourne.
Steven Newman	Fitzroy	22 years, 200 days	12	1	0	
Scott Wynd	Footscray	18 years, 188 days	18	237	31	
Mark Hunter	Footscray	22 years, 214 days	1	130	10	
Terry Wallace	Footscray	29 years, 113 days	1	69	20	Previously played for Hawthorn and Richmond.
Matthew Hogg	Footscray	19 years, 105 days	1	59	4	
Stuart Wigney	Footscray	19 years, 103 days	18	47	21	
Darren Davies	Footscray	22 years, 178 days	2	37	35	
Adrian Campbell	Footscray	19 years, 187 days	15	30	31	
Stuart Nicol	Footscray	21 years, 206 days	4	7	4	
Michael Svilar	Footscray	18 years, 256 days	8	7	0	
Gary Irvine	Footscray	22 years, 299 days	11	7	0	
David Allday	Footscray	23 years, 154 days	5	6	1	Previously played for Melbourne.
Russell Shields	Footscray	25 years, 257 days	1	3	7	Previously played for Hawthorn.
Shane Hamilton	Geelong	17 years, 333 days	16	27	40	
Darren Denneman	Geelong	20 years, 33 days	4	4	0	
Stephen Lawrence	Hawthorn	19 years, 8 days	5	146	30	Son of South African Test cricketer Godfrey Lawrence.
Scott Maginness	Hawthorn	21 years, 251 days	2	131	8	
Tony Hall	Hawthorn	23 years, 199 days	1	97	144	
Andrew Gowers	Hawthorn	19 years, 41 days	8	89	54	
Dean Anderson	Hawthorn	20 years, 364 days	18	83	74	
Robert Dickson	Hawthorn	24 years, 140 days	1	17	12	Australian Survivor winner.
Sean Ralphsmith	Hawthorn	21 years, 250 days	21	4	3	
Andrew Demetriou	Hawthorn	27 years, 38 days	8	3	1	Chief Executive Officer of the Australian Football League. Previously played for North Melbourne.
Steven Febey	Melbourne	18 years, 269 days	7	258	40	
Andy Lovell	Melbourne	17 years, 263 days	3	164	166	
Peter Rohde	Melbourne	23 years, 170 days	6	117	22	Previously played for Carlton.
Jamie Duursma	Melbourne	24 years, 182 days	7	33	0	Previously played for Sydney and Brisbane.
David Flintoff	Melbourne	24 years, 138 days	9	31	20	Previously played for Hawthorn.
Jay Viney	Melbourne	19 years, 224 days	18	23	4	Brother of Todd Viney.
Mick Martyn	North Melbourne	19 years, 222 days	2	287	16	Son of Bryan Martyn.
John Longmire	North Melbourne	17 years, 114 days	4	200	511	
Wayne Schwass	North Melbourne	19 years, 127 days	1	184	97	
Anthony Rock	North Melbourne	17 years, 263 days	12	178	138	
Jose Romero	North Melbourne	17 years, 18 days	21	89	98	
Michael Murphy	North Melbourne	22 years, 207 days	1	3	1	
Mark O'Donoghue	North Melbourne	20 years, 274 days	2	2	2	
Darren Ogier	North Melbourne	25 years, 103 days	7	2	3	Previously played for Carlton.
Brenton Harris	North Melbourne	18 years, 282 days	16	2	0	Brother of Darren Harris.
Kevin Hughes	North Melbourne	25 years, 81 days	1	1	0	
Brett MacKenzie	North Melbourne	20 years, 68 days	19	1	0	
Matthew Knights	Richmond	17 years, 299 days	18	279	141	
Craig Lambert	Richmond	19 years, 182 days	1	123	53	
Brian Leys	Richmond	20 years, 90 days	6	110	19	
Trent Nichols	Richmond	18 years, 363 days	1	75	65	
Tim Powell	Richmond	19 years, 361 days	2	64	40	
Justin Pickering	Richmond	20 years, 246 days	1	59	54	Brother of Michael Pickering.
David Honybun	Richmond	26 years, 1 days	1	55	39	Previously played for Carlton.
Greg Hamilton	Richmond	19 years, 326 days	7	29	17	
Chris Pym	Richmond	22 years, 28 days	8	24	13	
Mark Summers	Richmond	21 years, 249 days	2	15	4	
Wayne Peters	Richmond	19 years, 77 days	21	5	1	
Paul Barlow	Richmond	19 years, 149 days	4	4	0	
Robert Harvey	St Kilda	16 years, 351 days	19	383	215	1997 and 1998 Brownlow Medallist. Brother of Anthony Harvey.
Jayson Daniels	St Kilda	17 years, 57 days	3	115	26	
Brett Bowey	St Kilda	19 years, 67 days	19	85	79	
Gordon Fode	St Kilda	17 years, 22 days	22	52	31	
Ian Muller	St Kilda	22 years, 304 days	8	21	2	Previously played for Carlton.
Bob Jones	St Kilda	26 years, 165 days	1	20	2	Father of Liam Jones.
Steve Turner	St Kilda	27 years, 99 days	1	12	1	Previously played for Melbourne.
Sean Simpson	St Kilda	18 years, 14 days	5	7	1	
Peter Freeman	St Kilda	19 years, 99 days	15	5	0	
Mark Dwyer	St Kilda	23 years, 353 days	17	1	0	Previously played for Fitzroy.
Glenn MacMillan	St Kilda	18 years, 307 days	21	1	0	
Mark Eustice	Sydney	25 years, 160 days	17	46	9	Previously played for Essendon and Richmond.
Mark Kellett	Sydney	27 years, 326 days	12	37	1	Previously played for St Kilda and Footscray.
Michael Parsons	Sydney	27 years, 190 days	2	25	14	
David Willis	Sydney	20 years, 182 days	15	25	3	
David Brown	Sydney	20 years, 266 days	6	12	18	
Michael Lockman	Sydney	24 years, 219 days	1	11	1	Previously played for Richmond and Collingwood.
Craig Davis	Sydney	33 years, 185 days	1	9	17	Father of Nick Davis. Previously played for Carlton, North Melbourne and Collingwood.
Adrian Battiston	Sydney	24 years, 235 days	1	9	3	Previously played for Melbourne.
Jim Silvestro	Sydney	24 years, 322 days	3	8	7	
John Brinkkotter	Sydney	21 years, 334 days	1	5	1	
David Cordner	Sydney	21 years, 334 days	2	5	6	Previously played for Melbourne.
Guy McKenna	West Coast	18 years, 327 days	1	267	28	Inaugural Gold Coast Football Club coach.
Chris Waterman	West Coast	19 years, 223 days	5	177	75	
Karl Langdon	West Coast	20 years, 5 days	1	100	107	
Murray Rance	West Coast	26 years, 68 days	1	57	7	Father of Alex Rance. Previously played for Footscray.
Troy Ugle	West Coast	19 years, 356 days	2	43	43	
David O'Connell	West Coast	25 years, 18 days	2	27	6	Brother of Michael O'Connell
Brent Hutton	West Coast	24 years, 8 days	4	13	9	
Joe Cormack	West Coast	21 years, 257 days	7	10	7	
Kevin Caton	West Coast	22 years, 300 days	18	1	1	
