= Waterson (surname) =

Waterson is a surname. Notable people with this surname include:

- Alan Waterson (1915–2003), Australian amateur golfer
- Alfred Waterson (1880–1964), UK MP
- Chris Waterson (footballer, born 1961), Australian footballer for Essendon and Brisbane
- Chris Waterson (footballer, born 1969), Australian footballer for Fitzroy
- Colin Waterson (footballer) (born 1959), Australian footballer for Richmond and East Fremantle
- Waterson (musician) (born 1980), Scottish musician.
- Edward Waterson (died 1594), English Catholic priest and martyr
- Fred Waterson (1877–1918), English footballer
- James Waterson (fl. 1993–1996), Scottish footballer
- John James Waterston (1811–1883?), Scottish physicist
- John Waterson (died 1656), London publisher
- Lal Waterson (1943–1998), English folksinger and songwriter
- Michelle Waterson (born 1986), American fighter
- Mike Waterson (1941–2011), singer and songwriter
- Nigel Waterson (born 1950), Member of Parliament for Eastbourne
- Norma Waterson (1939–2022), English musician
- Sidney Frank Waterson (1896–1976), South African politician
- Tim Waterson, Canadian drummer

== See also ==
- Watterson (surname), a similarly spelled surname
- Waterson (disambiguation)
- Watterson (disambiguation)
