= Bubner =

Bubner is a surname. Notable people with the surname include:

- Peter Bubner (born 1961), Australian rules footballer
- Rüdiger Bubner (1941–2007), German philosopher
- Matthew Bubner (born 1971), South Australian Agricultural Show/Motorsport commentator and announcer
