= Chris Waterson =

Chris Waterson may refer to:

- Chris Waterson (footballer, born 1961), Australian rules footballer for Essendon and Brisbane
- Chris Waterson (footballer, born 1969), Australian rules footballer for Fitzroy
