= 1995 Sturt Football Club season =

Australian rules football club season

The 1995 Sturt Football Club season was remarkable for a number of unwanted South Australian National Football League records:

1. The first (and to date only) team in the VFL/AFL, SANFL or WA(N)FL to finish with a 0–22 record
2. The first team in the VFL/AFL, SANFL or WA(N)FL since Fitzroy and Central District in 1964 to finish with a winless season
3. The furthest a team in the VFL/AFL, SANFL or WAFL/WANFL/Westar Rules has ever been from winning a game: not once did the Double Blues come within four goals of their opponents at the final siren
4. A seventh consecutive wooden spoon, beating St Kilda's VFL record from 1897–1902 and Woodville's SANFL record from 1980–85
5. Finished seven games behind second-last placed Woodville-West Torrens, equaling St Kilda's VFL record from 1902.

== Background ==
The Sturt Football Club experienced a long-term decline following a record 1978 season that saw the team win a SANFL record 21 of 22 games, but then lose the 1978 Grand Final by the narrowest of margins to Norwood. The Double Blues fell from minor premiers to ninth of ten clubs in 1979, and although they recovered to make the Grand Final in 1983 with Rick Davies kicking a then-SANFL record 151 goals, after the controversial sacking of Mervyn Keane at the end of a 1988 season that had seen the club rise from second last to finalists and apparently to potential premiership contenders, the club went into free-fall under the coaching of Davies in 1989. That season the Double Blues won only four games and towards the end as their on-field performances deteriorated the off-field strife that had seen Keane sacked recurred, with Davies resigning after Glenelg beat them by 132 points in the final match.

A succession of coaches failed to lift the Double Blues off the bottom of the table: the team won only sixteen of 106 games between 1990 and 1994, and following the sacking of legendary coach Haydn Bunton junior who guided the Double Blues to only nine wins in 42 games, Sturt entered a serious crisis as many experienced players departed, notably skipper Jay Viney to North Adelaide, Damian Kitschke to study abroad, Stuart Wigney to Glenelg and ultimately Richmond plus Chris Williams and spearhead Jody Arnol to Darwin. Former South Adelaide coach John Reid and former Central District mentor and Double Blues player Darryl Hicks were offered the coaching job but both refused, as did successful North Adelaide coach and former Sturt star Mick Nunan.

After an attempt to merge with Norwood and enter the AFL was rejected, Phil Carman, a former VFL star originally from Edenhope, took the reins on a three-year contract for 1995 after having been Sturt's fitness coordinator. At the beginning of the season Advertiser football writer and former Double Blues coach Trigg said that Carman had about the most inexperienced team he had ever seen to begin the season, with only John Richter, Andrew Johns, and new skipper Chris Thredgold as on-field direction. Carman's inexperienced list almost never threatened any of Sturt's opponents and by mid-season it was clear that a win was unlikely. Results became even worse later on; for instance, in a game against West Adelaide regarded the previous week as Sturt's "best chance for a win this season", the Bloods, two goals ahead at quarter time, set a goal of keeping the Double Blues goalless on a rain-soaked Adelaide Oval in the last three quarters and succeeded.

== Schedule and results ==
=== Round 1 ===
Round 1: West Adelaide v Sturt
Saturday, 18 March 1995	West Adelaide	def.	Sturt	Richmond Oval (crowd: 2,389)
4.6 (30); 7.9 (51); 12.14 (86); 16.17 (113)	Q1; Q2; Q3; Final	1.1 (7); 5.2 (32); 7.2 (44); 8.5 (53)	Umpires: Bettridge, Elliott
Woosnam 7.1, Andriske 3.1, Simister 2.2 Wheildon 2.1, Sporn 1.2, Fogden 1.1, Chandler 0.4, McLuckie 0.2 Fielke 0.1	Goals	Smart 3.1, Nash 2.0, Sutherland 1.2, Nelson, Lennon 1.0, Rowley, Hicks 0.1
Banik, Kilpatrick, Fielke, Simister, Wheildon, Sporn, Chandler, Symes, Hocking	Best	Judd, Nielson, Richter, Hicks

=== Round 2 ===
Round 2: Sturt v South Adelaide
Saturday, 25 March 1995	Sturt	def. by	South Adelaide	Football Park
5.1 (31); 7.2 (44); 10.3 (63); 11.5 (71)	Q1; Q2; Q3; Final	6.2 (38); 20.6 (126); 27.6 (168); 30.15 (195)	Umpires: Michael Abbott, Chambers
Burton 4.1, Sutherland 2.1, Waltham, Barker 2.0, Judd 1.0, Lennon 0.2, Johns 0.1	Goals	Del-Re 10.2, Osborn 6.2, Cameron 4.2. Lamb 2.0, Mills, Kean 1.2, Mcintyre, Jackson 1.1. Stoeckel, Battams, Trevena, Threadgold 1.0, Aulich, Polkinghorme, Lade 0.1
Johns, Sutherland, Geddes, Judd	Best	Cameron, Del-Re, Osborn, Jackson, McIntyre, Battams, Lamb, Polkinghorne, Trevena
With debutant Del-Re kicking ten goals and Osborn returning from an eighteen-month absence due to stress fracture of his back to kick another six, South kick their highest score ever against the Double Blues.

=== Round 4 ===
Round 4: Sturt v Woodville–West Torrens
Saturday, 8 April 1995	Sturt	def. by	Woodville-West Torrens	Adelaide Oval
3.0 (18); 5.1 (31); 11.4 (70); 13.8 (86)	Q1; Q2; Q3; Final	5.2 (32); 15.5 (95); 18.8 (116); 24.11 (155)
Packer 2.2, Burton, Sutherland 2.0, Nash, DeRon 1.1, Gray, Rowley, Lennon, Richter, Barker 1.0, Hicks 0.1	Goals	Taylor 6.3, Walker 4.0, Pesch 2.1, Morphett, Payze, Sheldrick, Niemann, Nichol 2.0, Lukosius 1.1, Sziller 1.0, Weidemann, S. Hannan 0.1
Sutherland, Waltham, Richter, Hicks, Judd	Best	Morphett, Sheldrick, Weidemann, walker, Sziller, Chapman, Taylor, Woods

=== Round 5 (SANFL Foundation Cup) ===
Round 5: Norwood v Sturt
Saturday 15 April 1995	Norwood	def.	Sturt	Johnstone Park, Murray Bridge
5.4 (34); 9.8 (62); 12.14 (86); 16.17 (113)	Q1; Q2; Q3; Final	5.1 (31); 7.2 (44); 13.3 (81); 14.4 (88)	Umpires: John Abbott, Richard Williams
Pascoe 4.4, Maynard 4.1, Theissen 3.2, Pierri 2.3, Balme 2.1, Davey 1.0, Rowe 0.3, Primus, R. James 0.1	Goals	Sutherland 5.0, Packer, Kennett 2.0, Richter 1.1, DeRon, Nelson, Feast, Obst 1.0
McIntosh, Rowe, Pittman, D'Antiochia, Turnes, Cowham, M. James	Best	Sutherland, Richter, Geddes, Waltham, Obst, Lennon
Injuries	Gray (foot); DeRon (shoulder)

=== Round 6 ===
Round 6: Sturt v North Adelaide
Monday, 25 April 1995	Sturt	def. by	North Adelaide	Adelaide Oval (crowd: 4,278)
4.3 (27); 8.5 (53); 16.8 (104); 16.10 (106)	Q1; Q2; Q3; Final	2.1 (13); 12.6 (78); 16.10 (106); 21.15 (141)	Umpires: Bettridge, Chambers
Packer 6.3, Sutherland 2.1, Obst, Kennett 2.0, Nelson 1.2, Barker 1.1, Burton, D. Thomas 1.0, Feast, Pelling 0.1	Goals	Mancini 5.0, Squire 3.1, Bamford 3.0, Atkinson 2.3, Griffith 2.0, Parker 1.5, Rosenboom 1.1, Nunan, Gray, Viney, Allen 1.0, McCarthy 0.1
Barker, Packer, Obst, Sutherland, Waltham, Lennon	Best	Perkins, Nunan, Mancini, Atkinson, Bamford, Rosenboom, Gerke.

=== Round 7 ===
Round 7: Glenelg v Sturt
Saturday, 29 April 1995	Glenelg	def.	Sturt	Glenelg Oval (crowd: 3,164)
5.8 (38); 11.15 (81); 18.17 (125); 28.23 (191)	Q1; Q2; Q3; Final	2.2 (14); 4.2 (26); 6.5 (41); 7.6 (48)	Umpires: Michael Abbott, Doddridge
Liptak 6.4, Kretschmer 4.3, Symonds 3.2, Mansell 2.4, McGuinness 2.3, Chigwidden 2.1, Hallahan, Strooper 2.0, Bailey, Scripps, Caldow 1.1, Rouvray, Bow 1.0	Goals	Burton 2.2, White, Packer, Nash, Barker, Irvine 1.0, Richter 0.2, Sutherland 0.1
Bailey, Symonds, Bartlett, Liptak, Strooper, West, Viska, Chigwidden, Kretschmer, Mansell	Best	Thredgold, Geddes, Sutherland

=== Round 8 ===
Round 8: Sturt v Central District at Clare Oval
Saturday, 6 May 1995	Sturt	def. by	Central District	Clare Oval, Clare (crowd: 2,166)
5.4 (34); 7.5 (47); 11.6 (72); 11.10 (76)	Q1; Q2; Q3; Final	2.4 (16); 5.8 (38); 9.9 (63); 14.16 (100)	Umpires: Michael Abbott, Doddridge, Vickers
Barker 3.0, Irvine 2.3, Nelson 2.0, Judd, Sutherland, Schultz, Obst 1.0, Richter 0.3, Lennon, Hicks 0.1	Goals	Coffee 7.4, Wynd 3.2, Cotter 2.0, Lee, Macgowan 1.0, Luhrs 0.3, Cook, Arnold, Schwerdt, Cotton 0.1
Richter, Sutherland, Geddes, Judd, Lennon	Best	Girdham, Luhrs, Haraida, Coffee, Macgowan, Wynd
Kennett (corked thigh); Packer (stomach ulcer; withdrew before game)	Injuries
With Grant Coffee converting chances efficiently after coach Alan Stewart demands each Bulldog midfielder carry out specific tasks against his Double Blue opponent, Central kick 9.7 (61) to 1.4 (10) to finish the game after Sturt lead by 27 points midway through the third quarter

=== Round 9 ===
Round 9: Port Adelaide v Sturt
Saturday, 13 May 1995	Port Adelaide	def.	Sturt	Football Park (crowd: 6,167)
6.4 (40); 13.8 (86); 19.13 (127); 24.20 (164)	Q1; Q2; Q3; Final	3.1 (19); 6.2 (38); 7.7 (49); 12.10 (82)	Umpires: Bettridge, Chambers, Inge
Olsen, Tylor, Ryan 4.2, Borlase 3.1, Darcy 2.3, Settre 2.1, West 1.2, Wilson 1.1, Rohan Smith, Waterhouse, Darren Smith 1.0, Ginever, Foster, Fiacchi 0.1	Goals	Sutherland 2.2, Obst 2.1, Burton 2.0, Judd, Irvine, Richter 1.1, Lennon, W. Thomas, Raidis 1.0, Warton, Kennett 0.1
West, Olsen, Borlase, Giever, Ryan, Settre, Angive, Rohan Smith, Delaney, Fiacchi	Best	Obst, Sutherland, Barker, D. Thomas, Feast

=== Round 10 ===
Round 10: Sturt v West Adelaide
Saturday, 20 May 1995	Sturt	def. by	West Adelaide	Adelaide Oval
3.5 (23); 4.8 (32); 8.10 (58); 10.13 (73)	Q1; Q2; Q3; Final	6.4 (40); 11.8 (74); 17.12 (114); 22.17 (149)	Umpires: Elliott, Jeanes, Slaven
Sutherland 2.0, Irvine, Burton 1.2, Lennon, Judd, Barker, Richter 1.1, Geddes, Trimboli 1.0	Goals	Woosnam 8.2, Simister 4.4, Kilpatrick 3.1, Wheildon, Fielke 2.0, Thomas 1.2, Godden, Barrett 1.1, Andriske 0.2
Thredgold, Feast, Sutherland, Irvine	Best	Kilpatrick, Banik, Woosnam, Symes, Barrett, Fogden, Morris, Edwards

=== Round 11 ===
Round 11: Sturt v South Adelaide
Saturday, 27 May 1995	Sturt	def. by	South Adelaide	Adelaide Oval (crowd: 1,912)
2.3 (15); 3.7 (25); 6.8 (44); 10.10 (70)	Q1; Q2; Q3; Final	4.4 (28); 8.7 (55); 12.13 (85); 19.16 (130)
Burton 3.0, Raidis 2.0, Sutherland 1.2, McEvoy 1.1, Schultz, Geddes, Johns 1.0, Lennon, Feast, Thredgold 0.1	Goals	Del-Re 7.4, Stoeckel 5.1, Harris 2.4, Porter 2.1, Osborn, Cameron 1.1, Jackson 1.0, Mitton 0.2
Geddes, Sutherland, Johns, Lennon, Richter	Best	Harris, Stoeckel, Cameron, Del-Re, Grummett, Lade Osborne, Porter
Injuries	Lamb (calf); Polkinghorne (stitches above eye)

=== Round 13 ===
Round 13: Woodville-West Torrens v Sturt
Saturday 10 June 1995	Woodville-West Torrens	def.	Sturt	Football Park (crowd: 36,955 (Note: Played as the curtain-raiser to the Round 11 AFL game between Adelaide and Footscray.))
4.6 (30); 13.8 (86); 15.12 (102); 16.16 (112)	Q1; Q2; Q3; Final	1.3 (9); 3.5 (23); 5.8 (38); 7.11 (53)	Umpires: Doddridge, Slaven, Richard Williams
Cichowski 6.1, Robins 3.3, Higgins, Hannam 2.1, Totham 1.3, Lukosuis 1.1, Morphett 1.0, Axon 0.2, Payze 0.1	Goals	Lennon, Burton 2.1, D. Thomas 1.2, Sutherland, Johns 1.0, W. Thomas, Barker, Obst 0.1
Ugrinic, Thorne, Totham, Higgins, Cichowski, Hannam, Lukosuis, Neimann	Best	Richter, Lennon, Thredgold, Johns, Nelson
Taylor (ankle; withdred from selected side); Niemann (ankle)	Injuries

=== Round 14 ===
Round 14: Sturt v Norwood
Saturday, 17 June 1995	Sturt	def. by	Norwood	Adelaide Oval (crowd: 2,879)
2.1 (13); 4.2 (26); 6.3 (39); 7.8 (50)	Q1; Q2; Q3; Final	5.3 (33); 11.9 (75); 21.12 (138); 30.18 (198)	Umpires: Jeanes, Pfeiffer, Vickers
Geddes, Barker 2.1, Burton, Sutherland, Feast 1.0, Trimboli, Warton 0.2, Beecroft 0.1	Goals	Robran 4.4, Prime 3.4, Russell 3.1, Harvey 3.0, Growden, Primus 2.2, Reade, Cowham 2.1, Schoell, Clements, Maynard 2.0, R. James 1.1, Thiessen, McIntosh 1.0
Geddes, Burton, Thredgold, Barker	Best	Fleming, Russell, R. James, Robran, Primus, Clements, Schoell, Prime, Growden
This is Sturt's biggest loss against Norwood, narrowly surpassing a 146-point defeat from 1991

=== Round 15 ===
Round 15: North Adelaide v Sturt
Saturday, 24 June 1995	North Adelaide	def.	Sturt	Prospect Oval (crowd: 2,000)
3.6 (24); 6.9 (45); 11.14 (80); 15.18 (108)	Q1; Q2; Q3; Final	1.2 (8); 3.5 (23); 7.6 (48); 11.11 (77)	Umpires: Doddridge, Slaven, Richard Williams
Parker 4.4, Mancini 3.1, Garke 2.1, Francou, Walsh 2.0, Squire 1.3, Jeffries 1.0, Atkinson 0.4, McCarthy, Bamford 0.1	Goals	Richter 2.2, Obst 2.1, Sutherland 1.2, McEvoy, Beecroft 1.1, Lennon, Raidis, Barker, Irvine 1.0, Geddes, Warton 0.1
Perkins, Sanders, Parker, Francou, Mancini, Atkinson, Walsh	Best	Richter, Geddes, Sutherland, Lennon, Feast, Barker
Parker (thumb)	Injuries	Johns (hamstring); Short (hip)
Reports	Richter for allegedly tripping Atkinson in the eighth minute of the second quarter by field umpire Williams

=== Round 16 ===
Round 16: Sturt v Glenelg
Saturday, 1 July 1995	Sturt	def. by	Glenelg	Adelaide Oval (crowd: 2,403)
1.4 (10); 3.7 (25); 11.10 (76); 14.12 (96)	Q1; Q2; Q3; Final	8.4 (52); 15.8 (98); 19.13 (127); 26.15 (171)	Umpires: Barnett, Chambers, Inge
Burton 3.0, Pascoe 2.2, Beecroft 2.1, Hicks, Sutherland 2.0, Raidis 1.2, Kennett, Thomas 1.0, McEvoy, Richter, Feast 0.1	Goals	West 8.3, Scripps 6.3, Hall 3.3, Symonds 2.1, Hallahan 2.0, Bartlett 1.2, McGuinness, Kretschmer, Liptak, Strooper 1.0
Feast, Richter, Geddes, Obst, Sutherland, Thredgold	Best	West, Scripps, Hallahan, McGuinness, Viska, Chigwidden, Liptak, Angove, Hall
Injuries	Symonds (knee); Bailey (corked thigh)

=== Round 17 ===
Round 17: Central District v Sturt
Saturday, 8 July 1995	Central District	def.	Sturt	Elizabeth Oval (crowd: 2,510)
9.4 (58); 12.8 (80); 21.11 (137); 28.16 (184)	Q1; Q2; Q3; Final	1.1 (7); 3.5 (23); 7.6 (48); 7.9 (51)	Umpires: Doddridge, Pfeiffer, Slaven
Wakelin 7.4, Cook 5.3, Wynd 5.1, Healy 3.1, Luhrs 3.0, Conway 1.2, Cotton 1.1, Lee, Green, Arnold 1.0, Schwerdt, Pyman 0.1	Goals	Richter, Nash 1.1, Pascoe, Geddes, Beecroft, Short, Hicks 1.0, Feast 0.3, Lennon, Raymond 0.1
Wakelin, Healy, Macgowan, Green, Fotter, Wynd, Cook, Windsor, Lee	Best	Feast, Richter, Sutherland, Turner, Short, Johns, Lennon
Girdham (slight concussion); Haralda (groin)	Injuries	Raidis (bruised calf)

=== Round 18 ===
Round 18: Port Adelaide v Sturt
Saturday, 15 July 1995	Port Adelaide	def.	Sturt	Alberton Oval (crowd: 4,242)
8.4 (52); 14.10 (94); 17.12 (114); 22.17 (149)	Q1; Q2; Q3; Final	3.1 (19); 3.3 (21); 8.5 (53); 9.6 (60)	Umpires: Elliott, Jeanes, Wyld
Ginever 4.1, Darren Smith 3.3, Darcy 3.2, Waterhouse 3.1, Malakellis 2.6, Borlase 2.1, Francis 1.1, West, Mead, Warrior, Sheehan 1.0, Wilson, Carter 0.1	Goals	McEvoy 3.0, Nash 2.0, Geddes, Richter 1.1, Pascoe, Feast 1.0, Kennett 0.2, White, Raymond 0.1
Malakellis, Ginever, Warrior, West, Poole, Borlase, Delaney	Best	Thredgold, Lennon, McEvoy, Feast, Richter

=== Round 19 ===
Round 19: Sturt v West Adelaide
Saturday, 22 July 1995	Sturt	def. by	West Adelaide	Adelaide Oval
2.3 (15); 2.4 (16); 2.7 (19); 2.8 (20)	Q1; Q2; Q3; Final	4.6 (30); 8.8 (56); 14.14 (98); 21.22 (148)	Umpires: Avon, Burton, Richard Williams
Burton 1.1, Richter 1.0, Short 0.2, McEvoy, Lennon, Obst 0.1	Goals	Simister 4.4, Godden 3.3, Barrett 2.3, Wheildon, Chandler 2.2, Symes, Morris 2.0, Carlson 1.2, Fielke, Banik, Mansell 1.0, McLuckie 0.3, Kilpatrick 0.1
Feast, Richter, Geddes	Best	Kilpatrick, Carlson, Morris, Barrett, Fogden, Godden, Watkins, Symes, Mellor
Injuries	Wheildon (leg)
Sturt's score is its lowest since kicking 2.4 (16) against North Adelaide in July 1920.

=== Round 20 ===
Round 20: South Adelaide v Sturt
Saturday, 29 July 1995	South Adelaide	def.	Sturt	Hickinbotham Oval (crowd: 1,737)
7.4 (46); 10.5 (65); 17.5 (107); 23.7 (145)	Q1; Q2; Q3; Final	0.0 (0); 2.4 (16); 3.5 (23); 8.9 (57)	Umpires: Bettridge, Slaven, Wyld
Del-Re 12.1, Cameron 2.1, Grummett 2.0, T. Powell 1.1, West, Lade, Battams, Mills, Trevana, Polkinghorne 1.0, Sholl .2, Stoeckel 0.1	Goals	Obst 2.2, Feast, Lennon 2.1, Nash 2.0, Hicks 0.2, Burton, McEvoy 0.1
Del-Re, Battams, Polkinghorne, M. Powell, T. Powell, West, Jackson, Mills, Sholl	Best	Sutherland, Feast, Lennon, Thredgold, Geddes, Weatherald, Richter
Del-Re's 12 goals equalled the club record of "Diddy" Munro against Glenelg from 1936.

=== Round 22 ===
Round 22: Sturt v Woodville-West Torrens
Saturday, 12 August 1995	Sturt	def. by	Woodville-West Torrens	Adelaide Oval (crowd: 2,248)
3.3 (21); 6.8 (44); 8.11 (59); 12.13 (85)	Q1; Q2; Q3; Final	10.3 (63); 15.6 (96); 18.13 (121); 25.15 (165)	Umpires: Bettridge, Kowal, Wyld
Irvine 3.2, Beecroft 2.2, McEvoy 1.3, Lennon, Waltham, Sutherland 1.1, Feast, Burton, Geddes 1.0, D. Thomas, W. Thomas 0.1	Goals	Morphett 5.2, Thorne 3.2, Payze 2.1, Colville, Browning, Nichol, Ugrinic 2.0, Spehr, Sziller 1.1, Totham, King, Niemann, Rogers, Lukosius 1.0, Phillipou 0.2, Chapman, Higgins 0.1
Feast, Weatherald, Lennon, Irvine, Geddes, Sutherland, Richter	Best	Spehr, Ugrinic, Phillipou, King, Chapman, Sheldrick, Rogers
Damian Obst (replaced in selected side by Wayne Thomas)	Injuries	Weidemann (hip, replaced in selected side by Shaun Hannam)

=== Round 23 ===
Round 23: Glenelg v Sturt
Saturday, 19 August 1995	Glenelg	def.	Sturt	Glenelg Oval
2.6 (18); 11.7 (73); 15.11 (101); 20.22 (142)	Q1; Q2; Q3; Final	3.3 (21); 7.5 (47); 11.12 (78); 12.17 (89)	Umpires: Michael Abbott, Jeanes, Swaffer
Chigwidden, McGuinness 3.3, West 3.2, Hall, Scripps 2.3, Brooks 2.2, Moore 2.0, McNamara 1.2, Bartless 1.1, Hallahan 1.0, Strooper, Roehrich, Ottens 0.1	Goals	Burton 3.3, Irvine 3.1, D. Thomas 2.2, McEvoy 1.1, Sutherland, Obst, Beecroft 1.0, Feast 0.3, Richter 0.2, Lennon, Geddes 0.1
Chigwidden, McGuinness, Hall, Hele, Hamilton, Strooper, Angove	Best	Thredgold, Lennon, Richter, Irvine, Feast, Geddes, Sutherland

=== Round 24 ===
Round 24: Norwood v Sturt
Saturday, 26 August 1995	Norwood	def.	Sturt	Norwood Oval (crowd: 4,143)
7.6 (48); 11.10 (76); 16.17 (113); 21.21 (147)	Q1; Q2; Q3; Final	3.3 (21); 7.5 (47); 7.7 (49); 9.7 (61)	Umpires: Avon, Kowal, Swaffer
Reade 8.3, Irvine 4.5, Prime 4.4, Rowe, Harvey, Primus 1.1, Russell, Clements, James 0.2, Rowe, Smart, Growdell 0.1	Goals	Irvine 3.1, Beecroft 2.0, Burton 1.2, Richter 1.1, McEvoy, Nash 1.0, Kennett, Obst 0.1
Primus, Reade, Harvey, McIntosh, Irvine, Prime, James McCormack,	Best	Lennon, Nash, Richter
Injuries	Sutherland (concussion, sent to hospital); Feast (hip, replaced in selected side by Kennett)

=== Round 25 ===
Round 25: Sturt v North Adelaide
Saturday 2 September 1995	Sturt	def. by	North Adelaide	Adelaide Oval
5.2 (32); 8.2 (50); 14.3 (87); 17.4 (106)	Q1; Q2; Q3; Final	5.0 (30); 11.6 (72); 17.10 (112); 24.14 (158)	Umpires: Bettridge, Inge, Wyld
Burton 6.0, Beecroft 4.0, Obst 2.1, Turner, Lennon 1.1, Feast, Irvine, McEvoy 1.0, Warton 0.1	Goals	Parker 8.3, Squire 3.0, Atkinson, Rosenbloom, Bennett 2.1, Robertson 1.2, Sanders, Gerke, Allan, Bamford 1.1, Jeffries, Viney 1.0, Francou 0.1
Lennon, Burton, Nash, Feast, Beecroft	Best	Nunan, Parker, Squiare, Robertson, Tasker, Francou, Bennett
Burton for allegedly charging in the second quarter	Reports

== Aftermath ==
Following the 1995 season, it appeared certain that Sturt would not be able to survive for 1996 – indeed the 1995 players began training as soon as the horrific season finished, under uncertainty as to where they would be playing in 1996.

On 9 October 1995, a merger plan with North Adelaide was officially launched and the general public expected it to go through quietly, but a major membership drive to raise the $250,000 needed to keep the club afloat was a surprising success: in the following two months, the Double Blues’ membership rose from seven hundred to two thousand, and as Unley councillor Phil Sanders had feared, the merger with North did collapse.

Sturt were also able to engage in significant recruiting for the first time since the off-field strife of 1988 and 1989, acquiring twice Magarey Medal runner-up Brodie Atkinson and a number of lesser players. Carman, as promised when he began coaching the Double Blues, retained the coaching job for 1996 despite being on a 24-game losing streak. Sturt broke their 27 games losing streak against West Adelaide in Round 3 of 1996, but four wins and an eighth successive wooden spoon was seen as disappointing after the off-season off-field efforts. It was only in 1997, after further changes to the club's administrative personnel, that the Double Blues improved seriously, rising from perpetual wooden spooners to fourth place. In 1998, Sturt played in the grand final against rival Port Adelaide but went down by nine points. The Double Blues continued to be competitive on the field and club finances improved with the ultimate success achieved in 2002, beating Central District by 47 points to win its first flag since 1976.

Steady finals performances and strong financials kept Sturt afloat for a while, but another exodus of players led to two consecutive wooden spoons, and further heavy losses left the SANFL recommending that Sturt relocate or shut its doors in the 2011 off-season.

Strong executive leadership, key changes to the football and business departments and targeted recruitment, including signing premiership player Marty Mattner as coach in 2016, saw Sturt go back to back for 2016–2017 with a 27 point win over favourite Woodville-West Torrens in 2016, and another underdog win over Port Adelaide by one point in 2017.
