= Peter Freeman (footballer) =

Australian rules footballer

Personal information
- Full name: Peter Freeman
- Nickname: "Freezer"
- Born: 1 April 1969 (age 57)
- Draft: 42nd pick, 1991 National Draft (West Coast)
- Height: 188 cm (6 ft 2 in)
- Weight: 84 kg (185 lb)
- Position: Utility

Playing career
Years	Club	Games (Goals)
1988–1991	St Kilda	5 (0)
1992	West Coast	0 (0)

Career highlights
- Runner-up St Kilda reserves best and fairest: 1989; West Perth leading goalkicker 1994

Peter Freeman (born 1 April 1969) is a former Australian rules footballer who played for the St Kilda Football Club in the Victorian Football League (VFL) and West Perth Football Club in the West Australian Football League (WAFL).

Playing in a number of positions in both the forward and back lines, Freeman played five games for St Kilda, debuting against Carlton in round 15 of the 1988 season. He also finished runner-up in the club's reserves best and fairest in 1989. He was delisted by St Kilda at the end of the 1991 AFL season, but was subsequently drafted by the West Coast Eagles with the 42nd pick in the 1991 National Draft.

Moving to Perth, Western Australia, Freeman was unable to break into West Coast's line-up, and instead played for West Perth in the WAFL. After being delisted from West Coast at the end of the 1992 season, he remained with West Perth for several seasons, leading the club's goalkicking in 1994. He later returned to Melbourne, where he played for the Frankston Football Club in the Victorian Football League (VFL). Freeman also coached several teams at amateur level, including the Frankston YCW and Langwarrin Football Clubs in the Mornington Peninsula Nepean Football League (MPNFL).

== See also ==
- List of de-listed West Coast Eagles players
- List of St Kilda Football Club players
- List of VFL debuts in 1988
