= Svilar =

Svilar (Serbian: Свилар) is a surname. Notable people with the surname include:

- Michael Svilar (born 1969), Australian rules footballer
- Mihajlo Svilar (1947–2013), Serbian politician
- Mile Svilar (born 1999), Serbian and Belgian footballer
- Ratko Svilar (born 1950), Serbian footballer
- Zoran Svilar (born 1976), Serbian pool player
