= Andrew Brockhurst =

Australian rules footballer (born 1964)

Personal information
- Full name: Andrew Brockhurst
- Born: 18 August 1964 (age 62)
- Original team: South Adelaide (SANFL)
- Draft: No. 4, 1987 national draft
- Height: 188 cm (6 ft 2 in)
- Weight: 83 kg (183 lb)

Playing career^{1}
Years	Club	Games (Goals)
1988–1990	Fitzroy	38 (0)
- ^{1} Playing statistics correct to the end of 1990.

Andrew Brockhurst (born 18 August 1964) is a former Australian rules footballer who played with Fitzroy in the Victorian Australian Football League (VFL/AFL).

Brockhurst, a half back and wingman, was already 23 when he came to Fitzroy, having previously played at South Australian National Football League (SANFL) club South Adelaide. After a third-place finish in South Adelaide's 1986 best and fairest award, he was picked up by Fitzroy with their first selection of the 1987 VFL Draft.

Brockhurst had 20 disposals on his league debut, against the Brisbane Bears in 1988 and wouldn't better that number in the rest of his 16 games that year.
