= Glen Waverley Hawks =

Australian rules football club

Names
- Full name: Glen Waverley Football Netball Club
- Former name: Glen Waverley Hawks Football Club (1973−2020)
- Nickname: Hawks

Club details
- Founded: 1973; 52 years ago
- President: Matt Hollard
- Ground: No current home ground

Other information
- Official website: glenwaverleyfnc.com.au

The Glen Waverley Football Netball Club (GWFNC), nicknamed the Hawks, is an Australian rules football and netball club based in the Melbourne suburb of Glen Waverley.

Since 2023, Glen Waverley's football operations have been in recess after a post-season incident. The club still fields netball teams in Division 2 and Division 5 of the Eastern Football Netball League (EFNL).

== History ==
=== Early years ===
The club was formed in 1973 as the Glen Waverley Hawks Football Club with junior teams, growing rapidly in its early years to include teams from under-9s to under-16s with a total of 320 players. Justin Pickering, who later played for Richmond in the Australian Football League (AFL), played for Glen Waverley and was an under-10s and under-12s best-and-fairest winner, as well as an under-15s premiership captain. (Note: Glen Waverley's official history claims it was Michael Pickering, the brother of Justin Pickering, who played for the club. However, others sources indicate Michael Pickering in fact possibly played for Mount Waverley Juniors, not Glen Waverley. Demonwiki also notes that Michael Pickering "may not have played for Mount Waverley, but only lived there". It is known that Michael Pickering played for the Vermont Football Club shortly before he was recruited by Richmond.)

In 2001, Glen Waverley moved from the Waverley Junior Football Association (WJFA) in order to grow as a club, entering its under-16s side in the Eastern Football League (EFL, now EFNL). They started wearing a new jumper in 2003 − a blue jumper with gold and white side panels and gold hawk emblem − which remains used as of 2024.

=== Senior team ===
Glen Waverley introduced its first-ever senior team in 2005, entering Division 4 of the EFL. The club struggled in its inaugural senior season, finishing the year last on the ladder with only one victory (coming against Chirnside Park in round 2), while the reserves team had two victories but also finished last.

In 2006, Glen Waverley introduced a team in the EFNL colts (under-18s) competition. However, the senior side failed to win a game for the season and coach Bernie Ryan was dismissed by the club following round 7, being replaced by Mark Fitt. The club's 50-game losing streak game came to an end in round 16 of the 2007 season, with a 63-point win over Surrey Park.

The club eventually made its first senior finals series in 2008, making the preliminary final, and again made finals in 2009 and 2010.

Glen Waverley were minor premiers for the first time in 2011 and qualified for the grand final against Heathmont, guaranteeing the Hawks promotion to Division 3. The two clubs were tied at full time, with Heathmont going onto win in extra time by seven points.

In 2012, Glen Waverley came up against North Ringwood in the Division 3 grand final. The Hawks lost by 137 points, which remains the largest ever EFL/EFNL grand final margin in any grade or division as of 2024, and the club chose to stay in Division 3 to continue building its playing list.

Senior coach Mick Gaul left the club after round 11 of the 2013 season. Gaul, who was replaced by Mark Fitt, would later plead guilty to pointing a loaded gun at a suspect while serving as police officer in July 2010, when he was also Glen Waverley coach.

The club officially changed its name to the Glen Waverley Football Netball Club in late 2020.

=== 2022 post-season incident ===
In August 2022, following the end of the season in which they finished last, two Glen Waverley players were filmed performing a sex act in front of teammates at a public bar during "Mad Monday" celebrations. Other patrons at the bar also said players stole drinks, smashed glasses and were abusive to other customers.

One month later, Glen Waverley confirmed the players involved in the incident would not return to the club. Senior captain Mitch Potts led a walk-out of the senior players during an emergency meeting with the club and sponsors, accusing the club of not looking after his mental health. Potts left the club and was later suspended by the EFNL for eight weeks.

A number of businesses withdrew as sponsors for Glen Waverley following the incident, while the City of Monash also sent a letter that noted it could withdraw the use of a facility because of inappropriate behaviour, referring to the club's home ground of Central Reserve.

On 3 February 2023, Glen Waverley announced it would withdraw all its senior men's football teams for the 2023 season. On its official website, the club said it was "[brought] to its knees" and left "destroyed", and the City of Monash ultimately decided to cancel the club's tenancy agreement. Although the club stated its intention to return to football for the 2024 season, it has remained in recess as of September 2024.

Only one netball team (known as GWH Yellow) was left at the start of the 2023 season, with a second team (known as GWH Blue) added in late 2023.

== Seasons ==
Premiers	Grand Finalist	Minor premiers	Finals appearance	Wooden spoon

=== Men's ===
==== Seniors ====
Year	Division	Finish	W	L	D	Coach	Captain	Gary Hocking Medal (Best and fairest)	Leading goalkicker	Goals	Ref
2005	Division 4	10th	1	17	0	Dean Warren					
2006	Division 4	10th	0	18	0	Bernie Ryan; Mark Fitt					
2007	Division 4	10th	1	17	0	Mark Fitt					
2008	Division 4	4th	13	5	0	Mark Fitt			Matthew Carnelley	74	
2009	Division 4	3rd	11	5	0	Andy Owen			Matthew Carnelley	76	
2010	Division 4	4th	11	5	0	Mick Gaul					
2011	Division 4	1st	16	2	0	Mick Gaul					
2012	Division 3	2nd	15	3	0	Mick Gaul					
2013	Division 3	9th	4	14	0	Mick Gaul; Mark Fitt					
2014	Division 3	12th	0	18	0	Ryan Flack					
2015	Division 4	6th	9	8	1	Ryan Flack					
2016	Division 4	3rd	12	6	0	Ryan Flack		Paul Sinden			
2017	Division 4	6th	9	8	1	Ryan Flack					
2018	Division 4	1st	16	2	0	Ryan Flack	Jesse Dunne				
2019	Division 3	7th	3	15	0	Con Borg	Mitch Potts	Mitch Potts			
2020	Division 3	(No season)				Dylan Price	Mitch Potts	(No season)			
2021	Division 3	7th	2	7	1	Dylan Price	Mitch Potts				
2022	Division 3	9th	3	13	0	Brett Gatehouse	Mitch Potts				
2023	N/A	(In recess)									
2024	N/A	(In recess)									

== Club song ==
The club song is sung to the tune of "The Yankee Doodle Boy", which is also the basis for the Hawthorn Football Club song.

We're a happy team at Hawkland!
We're the Mighty Fighting Hawks.
We love our Club, and we play to win
Riding the bumps with a grin (at Hawkland)
Come what may, you'll find us striving
Team work is the thing that talks,
One for all and all for one
Is the way we play at Hawkland,
We are the Mighty Fighting Hawks!
