= Wayne Peters =

Australian rules footballer

Personal information
- Full name: Wayne Peters
- Born: 4 June 1969 (age 57)
- Original team: Morwell
- Draft: No. 14, 1987 national draft
- Height: 193 cm (6 ft 4 in)
- Weight: 80 kg (176 lb)

Playing career^{1}
Years	Club	Games (Goals)
1988–1989	Richmond	5 (1)
- ^{1} Playing statistics correct to the end of 1989.

Wayne Peters (born 4 June 1969) is a former Australian rules footballer who played with Richmond in the Victorian Football League (VFL).

Peters came to Richmond from Morwell, at pick 14 in the 1987 National Draft. He made his debut in round 21 of the 1988 VFL season, against Geelong at Kardinia Park. His other four league appearances all came in 1989.
