= Waterson =

Waterson may refer to:

== Music groups ==
- The Watersons, an English folk group
- Waterson–Carthy, an English folk group

== Other uses ==
- Waterson Point State Park, New York, U.S.
- Waterson, Berlin & Snyder, Inc., a music publishing firm from the early 20th century
- Waterson (surname), a surname

== See also ==
- Watterson (disambiguation)
