= Richard Lounder =

Australian rules footballer

Personal information
- Born: 20 January 1967 (age 59)
- Original team: Central District (SANFL)
- Draft: No. 1, 1987 national draft
- Debut: Round 5, 1989, Richmond vs. North Melbourne, at MCG
- Height: 203 cm (6 ft 8 in)
- Weight: 116 kg (256 lb)

Playing career^{1}
Years	Club	Games (Goals)
1989	Richmond	4 (5)
- ^{1} Playing statistics correct to the end of 1989.

Richard Lounder (born 20 January 1967) is a former Australian rules footballer who played four games for the Richmond Football Club in the Victorian Football League.

Lounder was a big framed ruckman who had much hype being taken at number one of the 1987 National Draft after playing a couple of seasons at Central District in the SANFL. He made his VFL debut in Round 5, 1989, kicking four goals against the Kangaroos, which was his career highlight. His next three games were not as impressive and he did not play again in the VFL/AFL, returning to South Australia at the end of the season. He played two more seasons for Central District before retiring from state level football at the age of 24. Lounder did win the Reserves Magarey Medal in 1989.

Lounder remains the heaviest player ever to play for Richmond.

Excluding active players, Lounder has the least VFL/AFL games played of any number-one draft pick, with just 4 matches played; the number-one draft pick with the next least VFL/AFL games played, Stephen Hooper, has a tally five times greater, with 21 matches played.
