= Brenton Harris =

Australian rules footballer

Personal information
- Full name: Brenton Harris
- Born: 9 October 1969 (age 57)
- Original team: South Adelaide
- Draft: No. 20, 1986 national draft
- Height: 185 cm (6 ft 1 in)
- Weight: 85 kg (187 lb)

Playing career^{1}
Years	Club	Games (Goals)
1988	North Melbourne	2 (0)
- ^{1} Playing statistics correct to the end of 1988.

Brenton Harris (born 9 October 1969) is a former Australian rules footballer who played with North Melbourne in the Victorian Football League (VFL).

Harris was selected with pick 20 in the 1986 VFL Draft, one of five players that North Melbourne secured in the draft and the only one to play a league game. He made two appearances, the first in North Melbourne's round 16 loss to Footscray in the 1988 season at the Melbourne Cricket Ground and the second came the following weekend, in a draw against Collingwood at Victoria Park.

Unfortunately, Harris was struck down by injury early in his football career, suffering a torn ACL in the first few months of the season. Attempts to recover from the injury were unsuccessful, and shortly afterwards, Harris was de-listed from the squad.

He is the younger brother of Darren Harris, who played 51 games for North Melbourne.
