= Simon Tregenza =

Australian rules footballer

Personal information
- Born: 9 March 1971 (age 55)
- Original team: Port Adelaide (SANFL)
- Draft: No. 59, 1987 national draft
- Debut: Round 1, 22 March 1991, Adelaide vs. Hawthorn, at Football Park
- Height: 182 cm (6 ft 0 in)
- Weight: 86 kg (190 lb)

Playing career^{1}
Years	Club	Games (Goals)
1988–1991 1998-2000	Port Adelaide	107 (67)
1991–1998	Adelaide	106 (16)
Total		213 (83)
- ^{1} Playing statistics correct to the end of 1998.

Career highlights
- Port Adelaide Premiership Player 1989, 1990, 1998, 1999; State of Origin Representative for South Australia; Fos Williams Medallist 1995 SA v Vic at the MCG; Adelaide Team of the Decade - Wing; Adelaide Football Club Life Member 1999; Port Adelaide Football Club Life Member 2005

Simon Lee Tregenza (born 9 March 1971) is a former professional Australian rules footballer who played for the Adelaide Football Club in the Australian Football League (AFL). An old-fashioned wingman, Tregenza is a four-time SANFL premiership player with the Port Adelaide Football Club, but missed out on Adelaide's back-to-back premierships due to persistent soft tissue injuries.

== SANFL career ==
Tregenza made his debut with Port Adelaide in 1988, playing just 2 games amidst the Magpies' first Premiership success since 1981. 1989 proved to be his breakout year as he performed brilliantly, playing 31 games including Port's demolition of North Adelaide in the Grand Final and finishing second in the Magarey Medal count behind Gilbert McAdam. In 1990 Tregenza once again starred, playing in yet another flag and again finishing second in the Magarey Medal count, this time to teammate Scott Hodges.

After his AFL retirement Tregenza returned to play for Port Adelaide in the SANFL, playing in the club's back-to-back Premierships of 1998 and 1999. Tregenza retired at the end of the 2000 season. Tregenza's outstanding service for the club was recognised with the Life Membership in 2005.

== AFL career ==
Tregenza was originally drafted by Footscray with pick #59 in the 1987 VFL Draft but chose to remain in South Australia. With the formation of the Adelaide Football Club and its entrance in the Australian Football League for season 1991, Tregenza was one of the coveted young stars expected to form the backbone of the club's pioneering years. For years Tregenza remained a valued first teamer before an ACL tear suffered in the Round 2, 1996 victory over Fitzroy marked the turning point of his career. Tregenza played just 19 more times before his AFL retirement in 1999, which was largely due to persistent hamstring injuries. Despite this disappointing end to his AFL career, Tregenza won selection to the Adelaide Football Club Team of the Decade in the wing position and was awarded Life Membership of the club in 1999. In lieu of Tregenza not fulfilling the usual 10 years or 200 games stipulation for Life Membership, the Club's Board recommended that due to 'Outstanding Service' Tregenza, Matthew Liptak, David Pittman and Rod Jameson should be granted the honour. "While they have played nine years, and not the 10 as required normally, the board's view is that as foundation squad members, and given their service during the tough times in the establishment of the club, they are worthy recipients of this honor", said then CEO Bill Sanders.

== Coaching and cricket ==
Following his retirement from football, Tregenza took up coaching Sacred Heart Old Collegians in the South Australian Amateur League where he guided the club to the 2001 Premiership. Following this success he was appointed Reserves coach of Port Adelaide in the SANFL for a number of years.

Today he plays for Sacred Heart Old Collegians in the Adelaide Turf Cricket competition.
