= Brendan Tranter =

Australian rules footballer

Personal information
- Full name: Brendan Tranter
- Born: 21 April 1971 (age 55)
- Original team: Maryborough
- Draft: No. 55, 1987 national draft
- Height: 177 cm (5 ft 10 in)
- Weight: 75 kg (165 lb)

Playing career^{1}
Years	Club	Games (Goals)
1989–1992	Collingwood	8 (0)
- ^{1} Playing statistics correct to the end of 1992.

Career highlights
- Joseph Wren Memorial Trophy 1991

Brendan Tranter (born 21 April 1971) is a former Australian rules footballer who played with Collingwood in the Victorian/Australian Football League

Tranter came to Collingwood from Maryborough, after being picked with the 55th selection of the 1987 VFL draft. He made his way into the Collingwood seniors for the first time late in the 1989 VFL season and in just his fifth league game found himself playing in an elimination final. The following year Collingwood broke a 32-year premiership drought but Tranter was called up just one, in round eight. He didn't play an AFL game in 1991 and appeared just twice in 1992.

For the remainder of the decade he was a leading player in the Bendigo Football League, with Maryborough. He participated in their 1998 and 1999 premiership teams, winning two Nalder Medals after being voted best on ground in both grand finals.
