= 1987 VFL draft =

Draft for the Victorian Football League

The 1987 VFL draft was the second draft to provide recruitment opportunities to clubs participating in Australian rules football's elite Victorian Football League. Held after the end of the 1987 season, it consisted only of the national draft itself.

== National draft ==
The format of the second VFL draft was much the same as that for the inaugural draft held the previous year. In each of the five rounds, the 13 participating clubs (except West Coast, which instead received complete access to all West Australian footballers for the second year) all received one selection, the order of which was set in the reverse of the previous season's finishing positions. The minimum age for draftees was again 16, but Sydney was the only club allowed to draft players from New South Wales who were under the age of 19.

Meanwhile, in addition to being involved in the national draft, the Brisbane Bears also kept the sole recruitment rights for all players from Queensland, and although country zoning had now finished, Victorian clubs retained exclusive use of Metropolitan Zones.

Like the previous draft, some players did not join the club that selected them. Notably, South Australians Chris McDermott, Andrew Jarman and Simon Tregenza all chose to stay at home and later became part of Adelaide's inaugural AFL squad, with second pick overall McDermott becoming the first captain of the team. Meanwhile, Jamie Cox opted for a first class cricket career with Tasmania over signing for Essendon.

The first choice was heavyweight ruckman Richard Lounder, who only played four senior matches for Richmond and has been described as the most derided number one national draft pick. However, Richmond had more success with the second round pick, Brendon 'Benny' Gale, who became a firm favourite at the club during his 244-game career. Other 1987 draftees of note included Graham Wright of Collingwood and Melbourne's Stephen Tingay.

=== National draft selections ===
Round	Pick	Player	Drafted to	Recruited from	League	Games with new team
1	1	Richard Lounder	Richmond	Central District	SANFL	4
1	2	Chris McDermott	Brisbane Bears	Glenelg	SANFL	0
1	3	Graham Wright	Collingwood	East Devonport	Northern Tasmanian Football League	201
1	4	Andrew Brockhurst	Fitzroy	South Adelaide	SANFL	38
1	5	Michael Quirk	St Kilda	Myrtleford	OMNFL	0
1	6	Andrew Rogers	Essendon	Woodville	SANFL	8
1	7	Darren Davies	Footscray	North Hobart	TFL State League	37
1	8	Darren Jones	Geelong	Moe	Latrobe Valley Football League	0
1	9	Michael Murphy	North Melbourne	Glenelg	SANFL	8
1	10	Michael Parsons	Sydney	North Adelaide	SANFL	25
1	11	Tim McNeil	Melbourne	Norwood	SANFL	0
1	12	Grant Williams	Hawthorn	Sandy Bay	TFL State League	0
1	13	Peter Bubner	Carlton	Central District	SANFL	0
2	14	Wayne Peters	Richmond	Morwell	Latrobe Valley Football League	5
2	15	Andrew Jarman	Brisbane Bears	North Adelaide	SANFL	0
2	16	Chris Grumley	Collingwood	Sale	North Gippsland Football League	0
2	17	Chris Waterson	Fitzroy	Cohuna	Central Murray Football League	13
2	18	Patrick Browne	St Kilda	North Albury	OMNFL	0
2	19	Jamie Cox	Essendon	Wynyard	Northern Tasmanian Football League	0
2	20	Stuart Wigney	Footscray	Leongatha	Latrobe Valley Football League	47
2	21	Shane Korth	Geelong	Natimuk	Horsham & District Football League	0
2	22	Scott Christie	North Melbourne	Strathmerton	Murray Football League	0
2	23	Scott Salisbury	Sydney	Glenelg	SANFL	0
2	24	Mark Ducker	Melbourne	Norwood	SANFL	0
2	25	Damien Trezise	Hawthorn	Union		0
2	26	Steven Oliver	Carlton	Castlemaine	Bendigo Football League	13
3	27	Brendon Gale	Richmond	Burnie	TFL State League	244
3	28	Andrew Bishop	Brisbane Bears	Ainslie	ACT Football League	0
3	29	Andrew Pascoe	Collingwood	Norwood	SANFL	0
3	30	Ashley Byrne	Fitzroy	Boort	North Central Football League	0
3	31	Jamie Keane	St Kilda	Koroit	Hampden Football League	0
3	32	John Cook	Essendon	Hamilton Imperials	Western Border Football League	0
3	33	Rod Gunn	Footscray	Hamilton	Western Border Football League	0
3	34	Stephen Hewitt	Geelong	Warracknabeal	Wimmera Football League	0
3	35	Craig Patrick	North Melbourne	Wangaratta Rovers	OMNFL	0
3	36	Tony Vigona	Sydney	Jerilderie	Murray Football League	0
3	37	Andrew Obst	Melbourne	Port Adelaide	SANFL	149
3	38	John Polkinghorne	Hawthorn	North Ballarat	BFL	0
3	39	David Kernahan	Carlton	Glenelg	SANFL	53
4	40	Bevan Cox	Richmond	Wodonga	OMNFL	0
4	41	Michael Kennedy	Brisbane Bears	Queanbeyan	ACT Football League	23
4	42	Tim Wilson	Collingwood	North Launceston	TFL State League	0
4	43	Darren Wheildon	Fitzroy	Newborough	Mid Gippsland Football League	70
4	44	Bob Jones	St Kilda	Devonport	TFL State League	20
4	45	David Grenvold	Essendon	Glenelg	SANFL	112
4	46	Gary Gunn	Footscray	Hamilton	Western Border Football League	0
4	47	Stephen McQueen	Geelong	North Hobart	TFL State League	0
4	48	Liam Pickering	North Melbourne	Stawell	Wimmera Football League	23
4	49	Jim Silvestro	Sydney	Traralgon	North Gippsland Football League	8
4	50	Stephen Tingay	Melbourne	Shepparton	GVFL	162
4	51	Anthony Dessent	Hawthorn	Maffra	Latrobe Valley Football League	0
4	52	Stephen Gemmill	Carlton	Cobram	Murray Football League	0
5	53	Andrew Wisken	Richmond	Hastings	MPNFL	0
5	54	Adam Ladbrook	Brisbane Bears	Pakenham	MPNFL	0
5	55	Brendan Tranter	Collingwood	Maryborough	BFL	8
5	56	Keith Allan	Fitzroy	Central District	SANFL	0
5	57	Damian Kitschke	St Kilda	Sturt	SANFL	29
5	58	Peter Bennett	Essendon	North Adelaide	SANFL	0
5	59	Simon Tregenza	Footscray	Port Adelaide	SANFL	0
5	60	Pat Gribble	Geelong	Traralgon	North Gippsland Football League	0
5	61	Darren Read	North Melbourne	Leongatha	Latrobe Valley Football League	0
5	62	David Querzoli	Sydney	West Torrens	SANFL	0
5	63	Jay Viney	Melbourne	Sturt	SANFL	23
5	64	Peter Nunn	Hawthorn	Koo Wee Rup	Ellinbank & District Football League	0
5	65	Dean Adams	Carlton	Shepparton	GVFL	0
