= Watterson =

Watterson may refer to:

== Places ==
- Watterson Corners, Ontario, Canada
- Watterson Park, Kentucky, United States

== Other ==
- Watterson estimator, in population genetics
- Bishop Watterson High School, Columbus, Ohio, US
- The Henry Watterson Expressway (I-264), a highway in Louisville, Kentucky, US
- Watterson Towers, a student residence hall complex at Illinois State University, US
- The Watterson family from the animated show The Amazing World of Gumball
- Watterson (surname), a surname

== See also ==
- Waterson (disambiguation)
