= Bob Jones (Australian footballer) =

Australian rules footballer

Personal information
- Full name: Bob Jones
- Born: 22 October 1961 (age 65)
- Original team: Devonport (NTFL)
- Draft: No. 44, 1987 national draft
- Height: 192 cm (6 ft 4 in)
- Weight: 87 kg (192 lb)

Playing career^{1}
Years	Club	Games (Goals)
1988–1989	St Kilda	20 (2)
- ^{1} Playing statistics correct to the end of 1989.

Bob Jones (born 22 October 1961) is a former Australian rules footballer who played with St Kilda in the Victorian Football League (VFL).

Jones, an Indigenous Australian, grew up in Darwin, but came to St Kilda from Northern Tasmanian Football League (NTFL) club Devonport, at pick 44 of the 1987 National Draft.

Already 26 when he made his debut for St Kilda in the 1988 VFL season, Jones's 19 games that year were spent as a ruckman and in defence. Jones was also named in the Northern Territory squad for the 1988 Adelaide Bicentennial Carnival.

Jones suffered a season ending knee injury (torn medial ligament) in the opening round of the 1989 VFL season, against the Brisbane Bears at Moorabbin Oval. It would be his final appearance for St Kilda.

His son Liam Jones is a current AFL player, for the Western Bulldogs and previously for Carlton.
