= Justin Pickering =

Australian rules footballer (born 1967)

Personal information
- Born: 2 August 1967 (age 59)
- Original team: Glen Waverley
- Height: 185 cm (6 ft 1 in)
- Weight: 80 kg (176 lb)

Playing career
Years	Club	Games (Goals)
1988–1991	Richmond	59 (54)
1992	Footscray	0 (0)

Justin Pickering is a former Australian rules footballer notable for playing for Richmond in the Australian Football League (AFL). His brother, Michael, also played for Richmond.

== Career ==
=== Juniors ===
Pickering played for Glen Waverley in the Waverley Junior Football Association (WJFA) and was an under-10s and under-12s best-and-fairest winner, as well as an under-15s premiership captain. (Note: Glen Waverley's official history claims it was Michael Pickering, the brother of Justin, who played for the club. However, others sources indicate Michael Pickering in fact possibly played for Mount Waverley Juniors, not Glen Waverley. Demonwiki also notes that Michael Pickering "may not have played for Mount Waverley, but only lived there". It is known that Michael Pickering played for the Vermont Football Club shortly before he was recruited by Richmond.)

=== AFL ===
Pickering made his debut for Richmond in Round One of the 1988 VFL season and played 22 matches in his debut season. He followed this up with 18 games during the 1989 season. The following two seasons he played a total of 18 matches to have a total 59 senior matches at the end of the 1991 AFL season.

Pickering was drafted by Footscray at selection 58 in the 1991 AFL draft, however he never played a senior match for the club.
