= Steven Newman (Australian footballer) =

Australian rules footballer

Personal information
- Full name: Steven Newman
- Born: 1 December 1965 (age 60)
- Original team: Palms Football Club (MPNFL)
- Height: 198 cm (6 ft 6 in)
- Weight: 95 kg (209 lb)

Playing career^{1}
Years	Club	Games (Goals)
1988	Fitzroy	1 (0)
1990	Central District	2 (0)
- ^{1} Playing statistics correct to the end of 1990.

Steven Newman (born 1 December 1965) is a former Australian rules footballer who played 1 game for Fitzroy in the Victorian Football League (VFL) in 1988.

Originally from the Palms Football Club in the Mornington Peninsula Nepean Football League, he was recruited by Fitzroy from the Essendon reserves at the beginning of the 1988 VFL season. He failed to register any statistics in his only game for Fitzroy, which happened to be against Essendon. The game was notable for Fitzroy being kept goalless in the opening quarter, but then Essendon failed to score a goal for the remainder of the game to lose by three goals.

After being delisted by Fitzroy, Newman moved to South Australian National Football League (SANFL) club Central District in 1990, playing two games.
