= Gary Irvine (Australian footballer) =

Australian rules footballer

Personal information
- Full name: Gary Irvine
- Born: 17 August 1965 (age 61)
- Height: 185 cm (6 ft 1 in)
- Weight: 82 kg (181 lb)

Playing career^{1}
Years	Club	Games (Goals)
1988	Footscray	7 (0)
- ^{1} Playing statistics correct to the end of 1988.

Gary Irvine (born 17 August 1965) is a former Australian rules footballer who played with Footscray in the Victorian Football League (VFL).
