= Damian Kitschke =

Australian rules footballer

Personal information
- Full name: Damian Kitschke
- Born: 13 May 1966 (age 60)
- Original team: Sturt
- Draft: No. 57, 1987 national draft
- Height: 193 cm (6 ft 4 in)
- Weight: 101 kg (223 lb)

Playing career^{1}
Years	Club	Games (Goals)
1990–1991	St Kilda	29 (14)
- ^{1} Playing statistics correct to the end of 1991.

Damian Kitschke (born 13 May 1966) is a former Australian rules footballer who played with St Kilda in the Australian Football League (AFL).

Kitschke, a ruckman and forward, started his career at Sturt, in 1986. He was selected by St Kilda with pick 57 in the 1987 National Draft and played 29 games for the club over the course of two seasons.
