= Russell Shields =

Australian rules footballer

Personal information
- Born: 22 July 1962 (age 64); Frankston
- Original team: Frankston Peninsula
- Height: 180 cm (5 ft 11 in)
- Weight: 80 kg (176 lb)

Playing career^{1}
Years	Club	Games (Goals)
1983–1984	Hawthorn	17 (15)
1988	Footscray	3 (7)
Total		20 (22)
- ^{1} Playing statistics correct to the end of 1988.

Russell Shields (born 22 July 1962) is a former Australian rules footballer who played for Hawthorn in the Victorian Football League. He was recruited from Frankston Peninsula.

After playing 17 games over two years at Hawthorn, he moved to South Australia to play for Central District in the South Australian National Football League. He returned to Victoria in 1988 to play for Footscray, where he kicked 5 goals in round 1, his first game for the Bulldogs.
