= Rüdiger Bubner =

German philosopher (1941–2007)

Rüdiger Bubner (9 May 1941 – 9 February 2007) was a German philosopher, born in Lüdenscheid.

He was a professor at Heidelberg University from 1996. He was also a member of the Heidelberg Academy of Sciences and an honorary member of the Theological Faculty of the University of Freiburg. His main areas of specialisation were aesthetics and practical philosophy with reference to ancient philosophy, German idealism, and phenomenology.

Works in English include Modern German Philosophy (Cambridge University Press, Cambridge 1981, ISBN 0-521-29711-7) and The Innovation of Idealism (Cambridge University Press 2003), in which he examines German idealism and its historical heritage.

He died in Heidelberg.
