= Darren Saunders =

Australian rules footballer

Personal information
- Born: 16 August 1965 (age 61)
- Original team: Seddon / Kingsville
- Height: 180 cm (5 ft 11 in)
- Weight: 80 kg (176 lb)

Playing career^{1}
Years	Club	Games (Goals)
1986	Footscray	6 (0)
1988–1993	Collingwood	44 (2)
Total		50 (2)
- ^{1} Playing statistics correct to the end of 1993.

Darren Saunders (born 16 August 1965) is a former Australian rules footballer who played with Footscray and Collingwood in the Victorian/Australian Football League (VFL/AFL).

Saunders, a defender, came to Footscray from Kingsville. An Altona resident originally zoned to South Melbourne Saunders was dealt to Footscray as his grandmother resided in Seddon He made six appearances in the 1986 VFL season, then had a stint at East Ballarat. In 1987 he began playing for Collingwood and his seven games that year included a semi final loss to Melbourne. He played four games in Collingwood's premiership year, 1990, the last in round five.

After his AFL career ended, Saunders played for Victorian Football Association club Werribee.
