= Peter Bubner =

Australian rules footballer (born 1961)

Personal information
- Born: 12 May 1961 (age 65); Hamley Bridge, South Australia
- Original team: Hamley Bridge (APFL)
- Height: 193 cm (6 ft 4 in)
- Weight: 88 kg (194 lb)

Playing career
Years	Club	Games (Goals)
1980–1990	Central District (SANFL)	199 (168)
1991–1992	Sturt (SANFL)	28 (0)
Total		227 (171)

Representative team honours
Years	Team	Games (Goals)
1983-1988	South Australia	7
1987	Australia	1 (0)

Peter Bubner (born 12 May 1961) is an Australian rules footballer who played in the South Australian National Football League (SANFL) for the Central District Football Club and Sturt Football Club from 1980 to 1992.

== Biography ==
Born on 12 May 1961, in Hamley Bridge, South Australia, Bubner joined the Central District Under 17s in 1977 and represented South Australia in the 1978 Teal Cup. Making his senior debut for Central District in the 1980 SANFL season as a key defender, Bubner initially struggled to keep his place in the senior side, playing only 11 games in his first two seasons, before flourishing in defence and winning Central District's Best and Fairest in 1983.

Bubner's continued good form led to his drafting by Carlton Football Club in the first round (pick 13) in the 1987 VFL Draft. Partly due to the SANFL's Player Retention Scheme, which provided extra payments for leading SANFL players, Bubner remained at Central District.

Bubner represented South Australia seven times, including at the 1988 Adelaide Bicentennial Carnival, as well as representing Australia during the 1987 series against Ireland.

In October 1990, Bubner was named in the Adelaide Football Club's initial training squad but instead transferred to Sturt where he played his final two seasons at SANFL level before retiring. He currently works as a Physical Education teacher at Prince Alfred College.

Bubner's father John Bubner played SANFL football for North Adelaide and brother David Bubner also played for Central District.

== Sources ==
- Hornsey, A. (ed.) Football Times Year Book 1982, Ashley Hornsey: Port Adelaide.
- Hornsey, A. (ed.) Football Times Year Book 1986, Ashley Hornsey: Port Adelaide.
