= Jay Viney =

Australian rules footballer

Personal information
- Full name: Jay W. Viney
- Born: 20 December 1968 (age 57)
- Original team: Sturt
- Draft: No. 63, 1987 national draft
- Height: 180 cm (5 ft 11 in)
- Weight: 89 kg (196 lb)

Playing career^{1}
Years	Club	Games (Goals)
1988–1991	Melbourne	23 (4)
- ^{1} Playing statistics correct to the end of 1991.

Jay W. Viney (born 20 December 1968) is a former Australian rules footballer who played with Melbourne in the Victorian/Australian Football League (VFL/AFL).

Viney played senior football at Sturt before being reunited with his elder brother Todd when Melbourne recruited him in the 1987 VFL Draft.

He found it difficult to put together regular VFL/AFL appearances but he did play in the last 11 home and away games of the 1991 AFL season. However he was then let go by Melbourne and returned to the South Australian National Football League where he captained the embattled Double Blues under famous coach Haydn Bunton junior in 1993 and 1994, but could not avoid a fifth and then a sixth consecutive wooden spoon. When a merger with Norwood to form an AFL club failed, Sturt entered a crisis that saw Viney and many others leave the club, resulting in the club's worst season on record in 1995. Viney finished his career playing for North Adelaide, a club he was captain of in 1997 and 1998.
