= Watterson (surname) =

Watterson is a surname. Notable people with this surname include:

- Bill Watterson, American cartoonist, creator of the comic strip Calvin and Hobbes
- Henry Watterson (1840–1921), American journalist
- John Ambrose Watterson (1844–1899), American Roman Catholic bishop
- Juan Watterson, Isle of Man politician
- Mike Watterson (1942–2019), English snooker player
- Peter Watterson (1927–1996), American Catholic priest

== See also ==
- Waterson (surname)
