= Darren Louttit =

Australian rules footballer

Personal information
- Full name: Darren Louttit
- Born: 26 March 1965 (age 61)
- Original team: St Peters
- Height: 193 cm (6 ft 4 in)
- Weight: 82 kg (181 lb)
- Position: Defence

Playing career^{1}
Years	Club	Games (Goals)
1985–86	Melbourne	13 (1)
1988	Fitzroy	2 (0)
Total		15 (1)
- ^{1} Playing statistics correct to the end of 1988.

Darren Louttit (born 26 March 1965) is a former Australian rules footballer who played with Melbourne and Fitzroy in the Victorian Football League (VFL).
