= Darren Wheildon =

Australian rules footballer

Personal information
- Full name: Darren Wheildon
- Born: 11 November 1970 (age 55)
- Original team: Newborough
- Draft: No. 43, 1987 national draft
- Height: 184 cm (6 ft 0 in)
- Weight: 90 kg (198 lb)
- Position: Forward

Playing career^{1}
| Years | Club | Games (Goals) |
| 1989–94 | Fitzroy | 70 (160) |
| 1995 | Essendon | 0 (0) |
- ^{1} Playing statistics correct to the end of 1994.

Darren 'Doc' Wheildon (born 11 November 1970) is a former Australian rules footballer who played for Fitzroy in the Australian Football League (AFL).

Originally from Newborough, Wheildon bagged a seven-goal haul in just his third league game, against the Brisbane Bears at Carrara. One of his best performances came when he kicked six goals and six behinds against a strong Hawthorn team in 1992. The following season, against Sydney at the SCG, he kicked a career best eight goals, in a shoot-out with Simon Minton-Connell who also kicked eight. Wheildon finished the 1992 season with 41 goals, his best ever season tally, but unlike the 29 goals he kicked in 1991 it wasn't enough to top Fitzroy's charts.

From 1990 to 1993, Wheildon was sent to the AFL Tribunal no less than seven times. On one occasion, in 1993, he was fined after being found guilty of shaking a goalpost when an opponent was taking a shot at goal.

Wheildon left Fitzroy after the 1994 season and played at West Adelaide before he was given another chance at AFL, recruited by Essendon with pick 15 in the 1995 AFL draft. He however never got a chance to play for them after he was hit by a taxi in King Street and badly injured his legs, ending his career.
