= Steve Turner (Australian rules footballer) =

Australian rules footballer

Personal information
- Full name: Steve Turner
- Born: 27 December 1960 (age 65)
- Original team: Queens Park / Perth
- Height: 193 cm (6 ft 4 in)
- Weight: 92 kg (203 lb)
- Position: Ruck

Playing career^{1}
Years	Club	Games (Goals)
1986–87	Melbourne	32 (10)
1988–89	St Kilda	12 (1)
Total		44 (11)
- ^{1} Playing statistics correct to the end of 1989.

Steve Turner (born 27 December 1960) is a former Australian rules footballer who played with Melbourne and St Kilda in the Victorian Football League (VFL).
