= Michael Pickering (footballer, born 1963) =

Australian rules footballer (born 1963)

Personal information
- Born: 30 November 1963 (age 62)
- Original team: Vermont / St Thomas College (Note: The official history of the Glen Waverley Hawks claims Pickering played for the club. However, others sources indicate he in fact possibly played for Mount Waverley Juniors, not Glen Waverley, and it was actually his brother Justin who played for Glen Waverley. Demonwiki also notes that Michael Pickering "may not have played for Mount Waverley, but only lived there".)
- Height: 187 cm (6 ft 2 in)
- Weight: 76 kg (168 lb)

Playing career^{1}
Years	Club	Games (Goals)
1984–1991	Richmond	136 (160)
1992–1993	Melbourne	15 (12)
Total		151 (172)
- ^{1} Playing statistics correct to the end of 1993.

Career highlights
- Jack Dyer Medal: 1988

Michael Pickering (born 30 November 1963) is a former Australian rules football player who played in the VFL/AFL between 1984 and 1991 for the Richmond Football Club and then from 1992 until 1993 for the Melbourne Football Club.

Pickering was a talented footballer from Vermont whose fine marking was the trademark of his game. Courageous and determined in his approach to the ball Pickering won the Tigers' best and fairest award in 1988. That season he was made vice-captain and led the side well when Weightman was unavailable, he fell out of favour late in 1991 and was traded to Melbourne playing only two seasons with the Demons.

He was appointed as coach of the Fitzroy Football Club in the Victorian Amateur Football Association (VAFA) for the 2012 season, serving until the end of the 2016 season.
