= Darren Harris (footballer, born 1965) =

Australian rules footballer

Personal information
- Full name: Darren Harris
- Born: 17 August 1965 (age 61)
- Original team: South Adelaide (SANFL)
- Height: 1.95 m (6 ft 5 in)

Playing career^{1}
Years	Club	Games (Goals)
1986–1991	North Melbourne	51 (28)
- ^{1} Playing statistics correct to the end of 1991.

Darren Harris (born 17 August 1965) is a former Australian rules footballer who played with North Melbourne in the Victorian Football League (VFL) and Australian Football League (AFL) between 1986 and 1991. Originally from South Australian National Football League (SANFL) club South Adelaide, his brother Brenton Harris also played two games for North Melbourne in 1988. Harris is the father of Olympic swimmer Meg Harris.

Harris played with Albury in the Ovens & Murray Football League from 1994 to 1996, kicking 162 goals.
