= Steven Da Rui =

Australian rules footballer

Personal information
- Full name: Steven Da Rui
- Born: 24 March 1964 (age 62); Mount Lawley
- Original team: St Marks
- Height: 183 cm (6 ft 0 in)
- Weight: 87 kg (192 lb)
- Position: Half back/ Ruck Rover/ centre

Playing career^{1}
Years	Club	Games (Goals)
1981–1986	East Perth	86 (16)
1988–1991	Carlton	55 (5)
- ^{1} Playing statistics correct to the end of 1991.

Steven Da Rui (born 24 March 1964) is a former Australian rules footballer who played with Carlton in the Victorian/Australian Football League (VFL/AFL).

Remembered as a hard-hitting, determined customer who took no prisoners on the football field. Da Rui, the son of Italian immigrants, played his early football at St Marks before joining WAFL club East Perth. Although used mainly as a half back flanker, he had perhaps his best season in 1986 when he played as a ruck-rover.

He was picked up by Carlton for the 1987 season but didn't feature in the seniors, instead spending the year in the reserves and winning a premiership. Da Rui became a regular in Carlton's VFL team in 1988 and participated in 20 games, including three finals. In the preliminary final, he was involved in an incident with Steven O'Dwyer which saw the Melbourne player miss the grand final through suspension. He represented Western Australia in their 1990 State of Origin match against Victoria.
