= Michael Svilar =

Australian rules footballer

Personal information
- Full name: Michael Svilari
- Born: 8 September 1969 (age 57)
- Original team: Seddon
- Height: 185 cm (6 ft 1 in)
- Weight: 76 kg (168 lb)

Playing career^{1}
Years	Club	Games (Goals)
1988, 1990	Footscray	7 (0)
- ^{1} Playing statistics correct to the end of 1990.

Michael Svilar (born 8 September 1969) is a former Australian rules footballer who played with Footscray in the Victorian Football League (VFL).
