= Chris Waterson (footballer, born 1961) =

Australian rules footballer

Personal information
- Full name: Chris P. Waterson
- Born: 26 March 1961 (age 65)
- Original team: Nullawil
- Height: 183 cm (6 ft 0 in)
- Weight: 76 kg (168 lb)

Playing career^{1}
Years	Club	Games (Goals)
1982–1986	Essendon	31 (11)
1987–1988	Brisbane Bears	35 (8)
Total		66 (19)
- ^{1} Playing statistics correct to the end of 1988.

Chris P. Waterson (born 26 March 1961) is a former Australian rules footballer who played with Essendon and the Brisbane Bears in the Victorian Football League (VFL) during the 1980s.

A utility, Waterson was a member of 1983 Essendon reserves premiership winning side.

He was never able to cement a spot in the Essendon seniors and his nine games in 1985 were the most he would play in a single season.

In 31 games at Essendon he played in 24 wins but the former Nullawil player wouldn't have the same team success when he was traded to the Brisbane Bears. Being part of a weaker side did however mean he was selected more regularly and he played 18 games in 1987, including Brisbane's first ever VFL match.

The following year he played another 17 games and also averaged 17 disposals for the year.
