= Chris Waterson (footballer, born 1969) =

Australian rules footballer

Personal information
- Full name: Chris L. Waterson
- Born: 27 December 1969 (age 56)
- Original team: Cohuna
- Draft: No. 17, 1987 national draft
- Height: 177 cm (5 ft 10 in)
- Weight: 73 kg (161 lb)

Playing career^{1}
Years	Club	Games (Goals)
1990–1991	Fitzroy	13 (7)
- ^{1} Playing statistics correct to the end of 1991.

Chris Waterson (born 27 December 1969) is a former Australian rules footballer who played with Fitzroy in the Australian Football League (AFL).

Waterson, a recruit from Cohuna, played nine senior games for Fitzroy in the 1990 AFL season and another four in the 1991 season. He selected with the 17th pick of the 1987 National Draft.
