= 1988 VFL season =

92nd season of the Victorian Football League (VFL)

1988 VFL premiership season
- Teams: 14
- Premiers: Hawthorn; 7th premiership
- Minor premiers: Hawthorn; 6th minor premiership
- pre-season cup: Hawthorn; 1st pre-season cup win
- Brownlow Medallist: Gerard Healy (Sydney)
- Coleman Medallist: Jason Dunstall (Hawthorn)

Attendance
- Matches played: 160
- Total attendance: 3,528,878 (22,055 per match)
- Highest: 93,754 (Grand Final, Hawthorn vs. Melbourne)

The 1988 VFL season was the 92nd season of the Victorian Football League (VFL), the highest level senior Australian rules football competition and administrative body in Victoria, and by reason of it featuring clubs from New South Wales, Queensland and Western Australia, the de facto highest level senior competition in Australia. The season featured fourteen clubs, ran from 2 April until 24 September, and comprised a 22-game home-and-away season followed by a finals series featuring the top five clubs.

The premiership was won by the Hawthorn Football Club for the seventh time, after it defeated Melbourne by 96 points in the 1988 VFL Grand Final.

== Night series ==
Hawthorn 10.10 (70) defeated Geelong 9.13 (67) in the Night Series, which for the first time was played entirely as a pre-season competition, rather than a concurrent competition to the Premiership season.

== Home-and-away season ==
=== Round 1 ===
Home team	Home team score	Away team	Away team score	Venue	Crowd	Date
Geelong	11.17 (83)	West Coast	14.20 (104)	Kardinia Park	20,981	2 April 1988
Essendon	25.14 (164)	North Melbourne	12.10 (82)	Windy Hill	18,390	2 April 1988
Carlton	18.18 (126)	Hawthorn	15.21 (111)	Princes Park	28,141	2 April 1988
Brisbane Bears	10.15 (75)	Collingwood	11.17 (83)	Carrara Stadium	11,306	3 April 1988
Fitzroy	20.20 (140)	St Kilda	17.16 (118)	Princes Park	18,774	4 April 1988
Richmond	16.12 (108)	Melbourne	23.16 (154)	MCG	34,824	4 April 1988
Footscray	16.6 (102)	Sydney	11.10 (76)	VFL Park	18,980	4 April 1988

=== Round 2 ===
Home team	Home team score	Away team	Away team score	Venue	Crowd	Date
West Coast	26.19 (175)	Essendon	11.10 (76)	WACA Ground	24,886	8 April 1988
Footscray	9.12 (66)	Melbourne	13.8 (86)	Western Oval	15,693	9 April 1988
Collingwood	15.12 (102)	Fitzroy	9.16 (70)	Victoria Park	26,158	9 April 1988
North Melbourne	20.7 (127)	Geelong	21.16 (142)	MCG	15,233	9 April 1988
Carlton	19.15 (129)	Brisbane Bears	7.19 (61)	Princes Park	16,891	9 April 1988
Hawthorn	26.15 (171)	Richmond	12.14 (86)	VFL Park	18,082	9 April 1988
Sydney	9.12 (66)	St Kilda	7.13 (55)	SCG	9,000	10 April 1988

=== Round 3 ===
Home team	Home team score	Away team	Away team score	Venue	Crowd	Date
Hawthorn	17.12 (114)	Sydney	13.15 (93)	Princes Park	9,921	16 April 1988
St Kilda	17.6 (108)	North Melbourne	11.16 (82)	Moorabbin Oval	16,573	16 April 1988
Melbourne	9.18 (72)	Geelong	9.10 (64)	MCG	30,870	16 April 1988
Footscray	16.12 (108)	Fitzroy	7.15 (57)	Western Oval	12,683	16 April 1988
Essendon	11.13 (79)	Carlton	23.13 (151)	Windy Hill	21,311	16 April 1988
Richmond	12.8 (80)	Collingwood	23.12 (150)	VFL Park	34,444	16 April 1988
Brisbane Bears	10.14 (74)	West Coast	29.18 (192)	WACA Ground	16,354	17 April 1988

=== Round 4 ===
Home team	Home team score	Away team	Away team score	Venue	Crowd	Date
Melbourne	13.18 (96)	Brisbane Bears	5.11 (41)	MCG	18,908	22 April 1988
Collingwood	13.16 (94)	West Coast	8.7 (55)	Victoria Park	26,276	23 April 1988
Hawthorn	17.18 (120)	Fitzroy	15.16 (106)	Princes Park	13,299	23 April 1988
North Melbourne	19.11 (125)	Footscray	13.9 (87)	VFL Park	14,948	23 April 1988
Sydney	10.20 (80)	Carlton	24.22 (166)	SCG	16,091	24 April 1988
Richmond	11.16 (82)	Geelong	24.17 (161)	MCG	27,417	25 April 1988
St Kilda	10.9 (69)	Essendon	14.7 (91)	Moorabbin Oval	31,679	25 April 1988

=== Round 5 ===
Home team	Home team score	Away team	Away team score	Venue	Crowd	Date
West Coast	14.16 (100)	Footscray	14.9 (93)	WACA Ground	17,662	29 April 1988
Fitzroy	12.19 (91)	Richmond	23.15 (153)	Princes Park	8,941	30 April 1988
North Melbourne	19.14 (128)	Hawthorn	31.19 (205)	MCG	15,438	30 April 1988
Geelong	17.14 (116)	Essendon	13.14 (92)	Kardinia Park	23,805	30 April 1988
St Kilda	12.12 (84)	Brisbane Bears	13.15 (93)	Moorabbin Oval	15,260	30 April 1988
Carlton	10.9 (69)	Collingwood	14.13 (97)	VFL Park	76,354	30 April 1988
Sydney	12.17 (89)	Melbourne	17.14 (116)	SCG	9,269	1 May 1988

=== Round 6 ===
Home team	Home team score	Away team	Away team score	Venue	Crowd	Date
North Melbourne	17.21 (123)	West Coast	17.8 (110)	MCG	11,133	6 May 1988
Footscray	12.19 (91)	Richmond	5.16 (46)	Western Oval	12,374	7 May 1988
Carlton	10.12 (72)	St Kilda	4.8 (32)	Princes Park	15,812	7 May 1988
Melbourne	9.14 (68)	Essendon	16.5 (101)	MCG	34,679	7 May 1988
Collingwood	13.13 (91)	Hawthorn	14.9 (93)	VFL Park	53,184	7 May 1988
Geelong	16.15 (111)	Sydney	17.12 (114)	Kardinia Park	19,106	8 May 1988
Brisbane Bears	17.11 (113)	Fitzroy	16.15 (111)	Carrara Stadium	9,981	8 May 1988

=== Round 7 ===
Home team	Home team score	Away team	Away team score	Venue	Crowd	Date
West Coast	17.10 (112)	St Kilda	3.18 (36)	WACA Ground	12,803	13 May 1988
Fitzroy	15.16 (106)	Sydney	9.13 (67)	Princes Park	8,568	14 May 1988
Melbourne	15.21 (111)	Hawthorn	13.12 (90)	MCG	34,773	14 May 1988
Essendon	17.17 (119)	Collingwood	11.9 (75)	Windy Hill	24,323	14 May 1988
Geelong	15.14 (104)	Carlton	14.9 (93)	VFL Park	26,372	14 May 1988
Brisbane Bears	10.12 (72)	Footscray	9.17 (71)	Carrara Stadium	10,898	15 May 1988
Richmond	11.7 (73)	North Melbourne	22.18 (150)	MCG	12,880	15 May 1988

=== Round 8 ===
Home team	Home team score	Away team	Away team score	Venue	Crowd	Date
Sydney	11.21 (87)	Brisbane Bears	17.13 (115)	SCG	13,322	20 May 1988
Fitzroy	12.17 (89)	Melbourne	17.13 (115)	Princes Park	12,997	21 May 1988
Essendon	20.17 (137)	Richmond	13.11 (89)	Windy Hill	14,520	21 May 1988
Collingwood	13.10 (88)	Footscray	11.16 (82)	Victoria Park	22,683	21 May 1988
Carlton	19.20 (134)	North Melbourne	19.7 (121)	VFL Park	22,978	21 May 1988
Geelong	16.12 (108)	St Kilda	17.12 (114)	Kardinia Park	20,345	22 May 1988
West Coast	9.9 (63)	Hawthorn	17.14 (116)	Subiaco Oval	27,024	22 May 1988

=== Round 9 ===
Home team	Home team score	Away team	Away team score	Venue	Crowd	Date
Essendon	29.20 (194)	Brisbane Bears	8.6 (54)	MCG	26,653	27 May 1988
Richmond	10.13 (73)	Sydney	20.16 (136)	MCG	11,468	28 May 1988
St Kilda	16.10 (106)	Melbourne	11.12 (78)	Moorabbin Oval	21,334	28 May 1988
Hawthorn	23.16 (154)	Footscray	9.11 (65)	Princes Park	12,786	28 May 1988
Geelong	20.13 (133)	Fitzroy	15.10 (100)	Kardinia Park	13,962	28 May 1988
North Melbourne	4.11 (35)	Collingwood	11.17 (83)	VFL Park	28,849	28 May 1988
West Coast	12.15 (87)	Carlton	15.10 (100)	Subiaco Oval	27,184	29 May 1988

=== Round 10 ===
Home team	Home team score	Away team	Away team score	Venue	Crowd	Date
Sydney	11.11 (77)	Essendon	8.7 (55)	SCG	14,753	3 June 1988
Fitzroy	24.13 (157)	North Melbourne	18.16 (124)	Princes Park	8,395	4 June 1988
St Kilda	17.19 (121)	Hawthorn	21.11 (137)	MCG	25,693	4 June 1988
Collingwood	10.11 (71)	Melbourne	12.12 (84)	VFL Park	61,163	4 June 1988
Footscray	11.9 (75)	Carlton	15.6 (96)	Western Oval	17,515	4 June 1988
Richmond	16.20 (116)	West Coast	10.15 (75)	MCG	7,157	5 June 1988
Brisbane Bears	16.13 (109)	Geelong	24.18 (162)	Carrara Stadium	8,637	5 June 1988

=== Round 11 ===
Home team	Home team score	Away team	Away team score	Venue	Crowd	Date
Sydney	18.24 (132)	North Melbourne	19.11 (125)	SCG	11,729	10 June 1988
Carlton	21.18 (144)	Fitzroy	15.11 (101)	Princes Park	21,900	11 June 1988
St Kilda	7.9 (51)	Footscray	11.12 (78)	VFL Park	24,149	11 June 1988
Brisbane Bears	23.13 (151)	Richmond	15.13 (103)	Carrara Stadium	13,222	12 June 1988
Melbourne	13.15 (93)	West Coast	10.13 (73)	MCG	28,045	13 June 1988
Hawthorn	17.16 (118)	Essendon	10.8 (68)	Princes Park	28,590	13 June 1988
Geelong	9.10 (64)	Collingwood	16.7 (103)	Kardinia Park	34,789	13 June 1988

=== Round 12 ===
Home team	Home team score	Away team	Away team score	Venue	Crowd	Date
Richmond	15.20 (110)	Carlton	12.21 (93)	MCG	19,458	17 June 1988
Footscray	7.14 (56)	Geelong	3.12 (30)	Western Oval	13,720	18 June 1988
North Melbourne	10.14 (74)	Melbourne	7.19 (61)	MCG	18,078	18 June 1988
St Kilda	3.12 (30)	Collingwood	7.9 (51)	Moorabbin Oval	23,880	18 June 1988
Hawthorn	10.20 (80)	Brisbane Bears	2.5 (17)	Princes Park	8,377	18 June 1988
Fitzroy	7.9 (51)	Essendon	4.9 (33)	VFL Park	18,854	18 June 1988
Sydney	14.20 (104)	West Coast	8.13 (61)	SCG	12,624	19 June 1988

=== Round 13 ===
Home team	Home team score	Away team	Away team score	Venue	Crowd	Date
Essendon	10.15 (75)	Footscray	15.9 (99)	Windy Hill	15,861	25 June 1988
Collingwood	9.14 (68)	Sydney	2.11 (23)	Victoria Park	23,031	25 June 1988
St Kilda	8.18 (66)	Richmond	5.11 (41)	Moorabbin Oval	17,770	25 June 1988
Hawthorn	17.10 (112)	Geelong	12.15 (87)	Princes Park	14,048	25 June 1988
North Melbourne	22.19 (151)	Brisbane Bears	13.7 (85)	MCG	7,764	25 June 1988
Melbourne	10.6 (66)	Carlton	5.13 (43)	VFL Park	37,953	25 June 1988
West Coast	17.19 (121)	Fitzroy	13.9 (87)	Subiaco Oval	14,827	26 June 1988

=== Round 14 ===
Home team	Home team score	Away team	Away team score	Venue	Crowd	Date
Sydney	13.18 (96)	Richmond	19.17 (131)	SCG	8,008	1 July 1988
Geelong	8.8 (56)	Melbourne	13.11 (89)	Kardinia Park	16,777	2 July 1988
Footscray	11.11 (77)	Hawthorn	15.15 (105)	Western Oval	14,338	2 July 1988
Essendon	16.16 (112)	West Coast	13.7 (85)	Windy Hill	10,274	2 July 1988
Fitzroy	10.11 (71)	North Melbourne	15.20 (110)	VFL Park	10,310	2 July 1988
Carlton	11.21 (87)	Collingwood	16.14 (110)	MCG	72,906	2 July 1988
Brisbane Bears	14.15 (99)	St Kilda	12.17 (89)	Carrara Stadium	10,394	3 July 1988

=== Round 15 ===
Home team	Home team score	Away team	Away team score	Venue	Crowd	Date
Melbourne	8.9 (57)	Sydney	19.16 (130)	MCG	20,269	9 July 1988
Fitzroy	21.16 (142)	Collingwood	7.10 (52)	Princes Park	13,961	9 July 1988
St Kilda	9.11 (65)	Carlton	10.9 (69)	Moorabbin Oval	15,416	9 July 1988
Footscray	12.8 (80)	Richmond	8.7 (55)	VFL Park	14,721	9 July 1988
Brisbane Bears	12.19 (91)	Hawthorn	17.13 (115)	Carrara Stadium	14,213	10 July 1988
West Coast	18.18 (126)	Geelong	16.10 (106)	Subiaco Oval	18,536	10 July 1988
North Melbourne	14.10 (94)	Essendon	21.14 (140)	MCG	26,755	10 July 1988

=== Round 16 ===
Home team	Home team score	Away team	Away team score	Venue	Crowd	Date
West Coast	14.14 (98)	Brisbane Bears	12.17 (89)	WACA Ground	15,831	15 July 1988
Essendon	16.14 (110)	Fitzroy	9.12 (66)	Windy Hill	14,467	16 July 1988
Carlton	21.15 (141)	Geelong	14.14 (98)	Princes Park	17,821	16 July 1988
Melbourne	14.10 (94)	Collingwood	6.12 (48)	MCG	74,964	16 July 1988
Richmond	17.13 (115)	St Kilda	15.8 (98)	VFL Park	20,199	16 July 1988
Sydney	24.19 (163)	Hawthorn	16.16 (112)	SCG	14,591	17 July 1988
North Melbourne	12.14 (86)	Footscray	16.17 (113)	MCG	16,872	17 July 1988

=== Round 17 ===
Home team	Home team score	Away team	Away team score	Venue	Crowd	Date
Fitzroy	19.20 (134)	West Coast	8.16 (64)	MCG	7,611	22 July 1988
St Kilda	14.8 (92)	Sydney	13.21 (99)	Moorabbin Oval	11,657	23 July 1988
Collingwood	14.8 (92)	North Melbourne	13.14 (92)	Victoria Park	16,082	23 July 1988
Carlton	13.22 (100)	Richmond	8.12 (60)	Princes Park	17,503	23 July 1988
Geelong	17.13 (115)	Footscray	10.9 (69)	Kardinia Park	13,492	23 July 1988
Melbourne	10.8 (68)	Hawthorn	21.11 (137)	VFL Park	37,307	23 July 1988
Brisbane Bears	10.14 (74)	Essendon	16.7 (103)	Carrara Stadium	15,950	24 July 1988

=== Round 18 ===
Home team	Home team score	Away team	Away team score	Venue	Crowd	Date
Sydney	12.16 (88)	Geelong	22.19 (151)	SCG	12,228	29 July 1988
North Melbourne	16.13 (109)	Richmond	21.14 (140)	MCG	11,909	30 July 1988
Collingwood	16.18 (114)	St Kilda	11.14 (80)	Victoria Park	16,408	30 July 1988
Fitzroy	9.13 (67)	Carlton	22.11 (143)	Princes Park	15,467	30 July 1988
Hawthorn	12.16 (88)	Essendon	9.8 (62)	VFL Park	35,662	30 July 1988
West Coast	18.14 (122)	Melbourne	11.12 (78)	Subiaco Oval	16,188	31 July 1988
Footscray	11.18 (84)	Brisbane Bears	5.13 (43)	Western Oval	11,694	31 July 1988

=== Round 19 ===
Home team	Home team score	Away team	Away team score	Venue	Crowd	Date
Collingwood	18.14 (122)	Brisbane Bears	11.10 (76)	MCG	20,575	5 August 1988
Footscray	19.18 (132)	St Kilda	9.9 (63)	Western Oval	10,477	6 August 1988
Essendon	12.18 (90)	Geelong	24.13 (157)	Windy Hill	15,641	6 August 1988
Richmond	23.11 (149)	Melbourne	20.11 (131)	MCG	20,475	6 August 1988
Hawthorn	27.16 (178)	Fitzroy	15.14 (104)	Princes Park	12,836	6 August 1988
Carlton	11.13 (79)	Sydney	15.17 (107)	VFL Park	18,355	6 August 1988
West Coast	16.19 (115)	North Melbourne	12.12 (84)	Subiaco Oval	18,089	7 August 1988

=== Round 20 ===
Home team	Home team score	Away team	Away team score	Venue	Crowd	Date
Richmond	11.20 (86)	Brisbane Bears	14.16 (100)	MCG	15,026	12 August 1988
St Kilda	13.10 (88)	West Coast	14.13 (97)	Moorabbin Oval	11,074	13 August 1988
Carlton	20.21 (141)	North Melbourne	20.17 (137)	Princes Park	16,723	13 August 1988
Melbourne	14.16 (100)	Footscray	17.8 (110)	MCG	27,026	13 August 1988
Collingwood	10.14 (74)	Essendon	10.13 (73)	VFL Park	52,719	13 August 1988
Geelong	10.8 (68)	Hawthorn	19.14 (128)	Kardinia Park	22,000	14 August 1988
Sydney	24.16 (160)	Fitzroy	14.13 (97)	SCG	13,811	14 August 1988

=== Round 21 ===
Home team	Home team score	Away team	Away team score	Venue	Crowd	Date
North Melbourne	16.17 (113)	Sydney	14.17 (101)	MCG	14,772	19 August 1988
Geelong	22.14 (146)	Richmond	16.12 (108)	Kardinia Park	14,338	20 August 1988
Fitzroy	19.13 (127)	Footscray	17.11 (113)	Princes Park	13,028	20 August 1988
Essendon	19.14 (128)	Melbourne	13.12 (90)	Windy Hill	19,863	20 August 1988
Hawthorn	18.15 (123)	St Kilda	11.12 (78)	VFL Park	19,222	20 August 1988
Brisbane Bears	14.13 (97)	Carlton	13.22 (100)	Carrara Stadium	16,727	21 August 1988
West Coast	16.15 (111)	Collingwood	7.9 (51)	Subiaco Oval	36,116	21 August 1988

=== Round 22 ===
Home team	Home team score	Away team	Away team score	Venue	Crowd	Date
Richmond	23.19 (157)	Fitzroy	7.12 (54)	MCG	19,496	26 August 1988
Hawthorn	28.16 (184)	North Melbourne	13.11 (89)	Princes Park	12,117	27 August 1988
Collingwood	19.15 (129)	Geelong	14.10 (94)	Victoria Park	19,813	27 August 1988
Melbourne	14.12 (96)	Carlton	10.6 (66)	MCG	50,178	27 August 1988
Essendon	12.12 (84)	St Kilda	8.17 (65)	VFL Park	26,134	27 August 1988
Brisbane Bears	11.11 (77)	Sydney	10.21 (81)	Carrara Stadium	12,718	28 August 1988
Footscray	3.11 (29)	West Coast	7.11 (53)	Western Oval	18,456	28 August 1988

== Ladder ==
(P)	Premiers
	Qualified for finals

#	Team	P	W	L	D	PF	PA	%	Pts
1	Hawthorn (P)	22	19	3	0	2791	1962	142.3	76
2	Collingwood	22	15	6	1	1948	1728	112.7	62
3	Carlton	22	15	7	0	2342	1961	119.4	60
4	West Coast	22	13	9	0	2199	1966	111.9	52
5	Melbourne	22	13	9	0	2003	1961	102.1	52
6	Essendon	22	12	10	0	2186	2017	108.4	48
7	Sydney	22	12	10	0	2169	2176	99.7	48
8	Footscray	22	11	11	0	1880	1803	104.3	44
9	Geelong	22	10	12	0	2356	2246	104.9	40
10	Richmond	22	8	14	0	2161	2540	85.1	32
11	North Melbourne	22	7	14	1	2361	2638	89.5	30
12	Fitzroy	22	7	15	0	2128	2538	83.8	28
13	Brisbane Bears	22	7	15	0	1806	2421	74.6	28
14	St Kilda	22	4	18	0	1708	2081	82.1	16

Rules for classification: 1. premiership points; 2. percentage; 3. points for
Average score: 97.5
Source: AFL Tables

== Finals series ==
=== Finals week 1 ===
Home team	Score	Away team	Score	Venue	Attendance	Date
West Coast	10.11 (71)	Melbourne	11.7 (73)	Waverley Park	43,438	Saturday, 3 September
Carlton	22.13 (145)	Collingwood	16.11 (107)	MCG	83,032	Sunday, 4 September

=== Finals week 2 ===
Home team	Score	Away team	Score	Venue	Attendance	Date
Hawthorn	9.12 (66)	Carlton	6.9 (45)	Waverley Park	60,052	Saturday, 10 September
Collingwood	12.10 (82)	Melbourne	13.17 (95)	MCG	87,407	Sunday, 11 September

=== Preliminary final ===
Home team	Score	Away team	Score	Venue	Attendance	Date
Carlton	14.14 (98)	Melbourne	19.6 (120)	Waverley Park	68,516	Saturday, 17 September

=== Grand final ===
Home team	Score	Away team	Score	Venue	Attendance	Date
Hawthorn	22.20 (152)	Melbourne	6.20 (56)	Melbourne Cricket Ground	93,754	Saturday, 24 September

== Season notes ==
- Three new rules aimed at encouraging a long-kicking style of play were introduced. These were:
  - The length of the 15-metre penalty for wasting an opponent's time after he takes a mark was increased to fifty metres.
  - Players were required to take a kick if awarded a free kick. If the player played on by handpass, the ball would be returned for a ball-up; the penalty for playing on was originally a free kick to the opposition, but this was commuted to a ball up after proving unpopular during pre-season trials.
  - The full-back was required to kick the ball over a distance of at least two metres when kicking in after a behind.
- The VFL banned lace-up guernseys starting from this season after Robert Flower and Brian Wilson both suffered broken fingers when they became tangled in the laces during tackles. A handful of players had been wearing the tight-fitting guernseys which were laced up in the front in recent years.
- The Brisbane Bears played two matches in Perth during the season. At the club's suggestion, Brisbane's home match against the West Coast Eagles in Round 3 was moved from Carrara Stadium in Gold Coast to the WACA Ground in Perth after persistent and heavy rain in south-eastern Queensland left the ground and its adjoining facilities unable to accommodate the game. Brisbane had expected the clubs' Round 16 match to be moved from Perth to Gold Coast in return, only to discover that the league considered the Round 3 match a home game for Brisbane, meaning that they would be required to travel for the Round 16 match in Perth as well.
- The VFL took over the operation of the financially crippled Sydney Swans during the year until its parent company, Powerplay, could find a buyer for the franchise. The VFL bought the club for a nominal $10 on 9 May, taking on its operating costs but not its debts.
- North Melbourne 18.16 (124) defeated Essendon 06.05 (41) in the under 19's grand final, held as a curtain-raiser to the reserves grand final on 24 September at the Melbourne Cricket Ground.
- Footscray 17.14 (116) defeated North Melbourne 14.12 (96) in the reserves Grand Final, held as a curtain-raiser to the seniors Grand Final on 24 September at the Melbourne Cricket Ground.

== Awards ==
- The Leigh Matthews Trophy was awarded to Gerard Healy of the Sydney Swans.
- The Norm Smith Medal was awarded to Gary Ayres of Hawthorn.
- The Under 19's Grand Final was won by North Melbourne against Essendon.
- The Reserves Grand Final was won by Footscray against North Melbourne.
- The Seniors Grand Final was won by Hawthorn against Melbourne.

== See also ==
- List of VFL debuts in 1988

== Sources ==
- 1988 VFL season at AFL Tables
- 1988 VFL season at Australian Football
