= Allies (Australian rules football) =

Representative Australian rules football team

Team information
- Nickname: The Allies
- Governing body: Australian Football League
- Home stadium: Various

Team results
- First game
- Allies 13.14 (92) to 8.13 (61) Western Australia; 1995
- Biggest win
- 13.14 (92) to 8.13 (61) vs Western Australia, 18 June 1995
- Biggest defeat
- 22.16 (148) to 14.11 (95) vs Victoria, 10 July 1998

The Allies is a composite team competing in interstate representative Australian rules football matches that comprises players from Australian Capital Territory, New South Wales, Northern Territory, Queensland and Tasmania.

The senior men's Allies contested four State of Origin matches in 1995, 1996, 1997 and 1998, and the senior women's Allies contested one State of Origin match in 2017. Allies teams have also contested the AFL Under 18/19 Championships since 2016 for boys and 2017 for girls.

== History ==
The team was first proposed as part of the AFL Commission's five-year plan released in August 1994. The AFL Commission in 1991 took over as national governing body, which included administering interstate football; this replaced the council of state-based governing bodies which had run their representative teams independently. The composite team was intended to renew the public's waning interest in the state of origin series by creating a single team which would be selected under pure state of origin rules, and which would be more competitive against the main states (Victoria, South Australia and Western Australia) than any individual minor state team. The venture gave players from those states the opportunity to compete against the main states. The team was launched as Australian Football Alliance in March 1995, nicknamed the Allies.

The senior men's team played its first match in 1995 was a win against Western Australia at Subiaco Oval and its last match was in 1998 against Victoria at the Gabba, suffering a 53-point loss. Its overall record was two wins (both against Western Australia) and two losses (both against Victoria). The best on ground for the Allies in each game received the Alex Jesaulenko Medal, named in honour of future Hall of Fame Legend Alex Jesaulenko, who began his playing career in Canberra. During its State of Origin tenure, the Allies attracted lower crowds than other major state representative sides; their sole home crowd was 13,977 (in Brisbane) in 1998, when a record six Queenslanders were part of the side. The senior men's team has not competed since the end of State of Origin representative football in 1999.

Since 1999, subsequent composite teams branded as the Dream Team and All-Stars have twice competed in one-off senior State of Origin matches against Victoria; these teams drew on all players of non-Victorian origin, rather than just from the traditional Allies states, and were branded differently to the Allies. These teams played against Victoria in 2008 and in 2020, respectively. A Superules All-Stars team plays in the annual E. J. Whitten Legends Game, held annually since 1996 (barring 2020–2022 due to the COVID-19 pandemic).

Since 2016, the Allies team has competed in Division 1 of the AFL Under-18/19s Championships. The team is selected from the top players in the former Division 2 state teams – New South Wales/Australian Capital Territory, Queensland, Tasmania and Northern Territory. The team won its first championship in 2023.

== Identity ==
The AFL chose the team's name to honour the Allies of World War II, which were celebrating the 50th anniversary of the war victory in the year the team was created.

The senior Allies wore a guernsey with teal and black halves in 1995, and they added a jagged white-trimmed orange field from 1996. Its guernseys and logos featured a stylised letter A formed from a black star on a white background. Since its re-establishment as an underage team, the Allies guernsey remains based on the 1990s design, but it is predominately sky blue, instead of teal, and adds a dark green stripe and maroon cuffs and socks, thus representing the state sporting colour of each of its composite state and territory teams.

In the AFLW, the team has worn orange and purple. The Dream Team/All-Stars have worn all white and gold/tan, mainly to avoid clashing with the darker Big V jumpers. The AFLW Allies guernsey since 2021 also includes green to acknowledge the inclusion of Tasmania. The latest All-Stars design featured a Commonwealth Star within an A symbol.

== Senior squads ==
=== 1995 ===
Allies vs Western Australia in Perth, at Subiaco Oval Coach:
Captain:
Vice Captain:
Deputy Vice Captain:
Australian Capital Territory
Brett Allison (North Melbourne)
Don Pyke (West Coast Eagles)
New South Wales
Billy Brownless (Geelong)
Northern Territory
Nathan Buckley (Collingwood)
Gary Dhurrkay (Fremantle)
Adrian McAdam (North Melbourne)
Michael McLean (Brisbane Bears)
Darryl White (Brisbane Bears)
Queensland
Marcus Ashcroft (Brisbane Bears)
Che Cockatoo-Collins (Essendon)
Gavin Crosisca (Collingwood)
Tasmania
Chris Bond (Richmond)
Matthew Febey (Melbourne)
Steven Febey (Melbourne)
Michael Gale (Richmond)
Simon Minton-Connell (Hawthorn)
Ryan O'Connor (Essendon)
Darrin Pritchard (Hawthorn)
James Shanahan (St Kilda)
Jason Taylor (Hawthorn)
Paul Williams (Collingwood)

=== 1996 ===
Allies vs Victoria in Melbourne, at MCG Coach: Neale Daniher (New South Wales)
Captain: Jason Dunstall (Queensland)
Vice Captain:
Deputy Vice Captain:
New South Wales
Billy Brownless (Geelong)
Shane Crawford (Hawthorn)
Ben Doolan (Essendon)
Mark Roberts (North Melbourne)
Greg Stafford (Sydney Swans)
Northern Territory
Nathan Buckley (Collingwood)
Ronnie Burns (Geelong)
Scott Chisholm (Fremantle)
Darryl White (Brisbane Bears)
Queensland
Marcus Ashcroft (Brisbane Bears)
Jason Akermanis (Brisbane Bears)
Che Cockatoo-Collins (Essendon)
Jason Dunstall (Hawthorn)
Michael Voss (Brisbane Bears)
Tasmania
Chris Bond (Richmond)
Matthew Febey (Melbourne)
Adrian Fletcher (Brisbane Bears)
Michael Gale (Richmond)
Ryan O'Connor (Essendon)
Matthew Richardson (Richmond)
James Shanahan (St Kilda)
Graham Wright (Collingwood)

=== 1997 ===
Allies vs Western Australia in Perth, at Subiaco Oval Coach: Neale Daniher (New South Wales)
Captain: Nathan Buckley (Northern Territory)
Vice Captain:
Deputy Vice Captain:
Australian Capital Territory
Don Pyke (West Coast Eagles)
New South Wales
Stefan Carey (Sydney Swans)
Ben Doolan (Essendon)
Jason Mooney (Sydney Swans)
Northern Territory
Nathan Buckley (Collingwood)
Ronnie Burns (Geelong)
Gary Dhurrkay (Fremantle)
Andrew McLeod (Adelaide)
Darryl White (Brisbane Lions)
Queensland
Jason Akermanis (Brisbane Lions)
Marcus Ashcroft (Brisbane Lions)
Danny Dickfos (Brisbane Lions)
Clarke Keating (Brisbane Lions)
Tasmania
Chris Bond (Richmond)
Daryn Cresswell (Sydney Swans)
Brendon Gale (Richmond)
Michael Gale (Richmond)
Trent Nichols (Richmond)
James Shanahan (St Kilda)
Paul Williams (Collingwood)

=== 1998 ===
Allies vs Victoria in Brisbane, at Gabba Coach: Damian Drum
Captain:
Vice Captain:
Deputy Vice Captain:
Australian Capital Territory
Justin Blumfield (Essendon)
Aaron Hamill (Carlton)
New South Wales
Shane Crawford (Sydney Swans)
Jason Mooney (Sydney Swans)
Brad Seymour (Sydney Swans)
Dean Solomon (Essendon)
Northern Territory
Joel Bowden (Richmond)
Ronnie Burns (Geelong)
Darryl White (Brisbane Lions)
Queensland
Jason Akermanis (Brisbane Lions)
Marcus Ashcroft (Brisbane Lions)
Danny Dickfos (Brisbane Lions)
Matthew Kennedy (Brisbane Lions)
Stephen Lawrence (Hawthorn)
Tasmania
Daryn Cresswell (Sydney Swans)
Matthew Febey (Melbourne)
Michael Gale (Richmond)
Ben Harrison (Richmond)
Paul Hudson (Western Bulldogs)
Michael Martin (Western Bulldogs)
Dion Scott (Brisbane Lions)
Matthew Young (St Kilda)

== AFL Women's ==
In senior women's football, an Allies interstate team incorporated players from the traditional Allies states as well as South Australia and Western Australia for a one-off match against Victoria in July 2017 at Etihad Stadium. Victoria won by 97 points.

At the Under 18/19s level, composite teams under the Allies name have competed in the AFL Women's Under 18 Championships since the 2017 season; however, these are differently composed to the men's competition. In 2017, the Allies comprised players from South Australia, Northern Territory and Tasmania; and since 2018, two separate Allies teams have competed: the Central Allies (Northern Territory and South Australia) and Eastern Allies (New South Wales, ACT and Tasmania). Queensland, historically an Allies state in men's/boys' football, is one of the stronger states in women's football and competes stand-alone.
