= Operation Baker =

Part of the Vietnam War (1967)

- Part of the Vietnam War
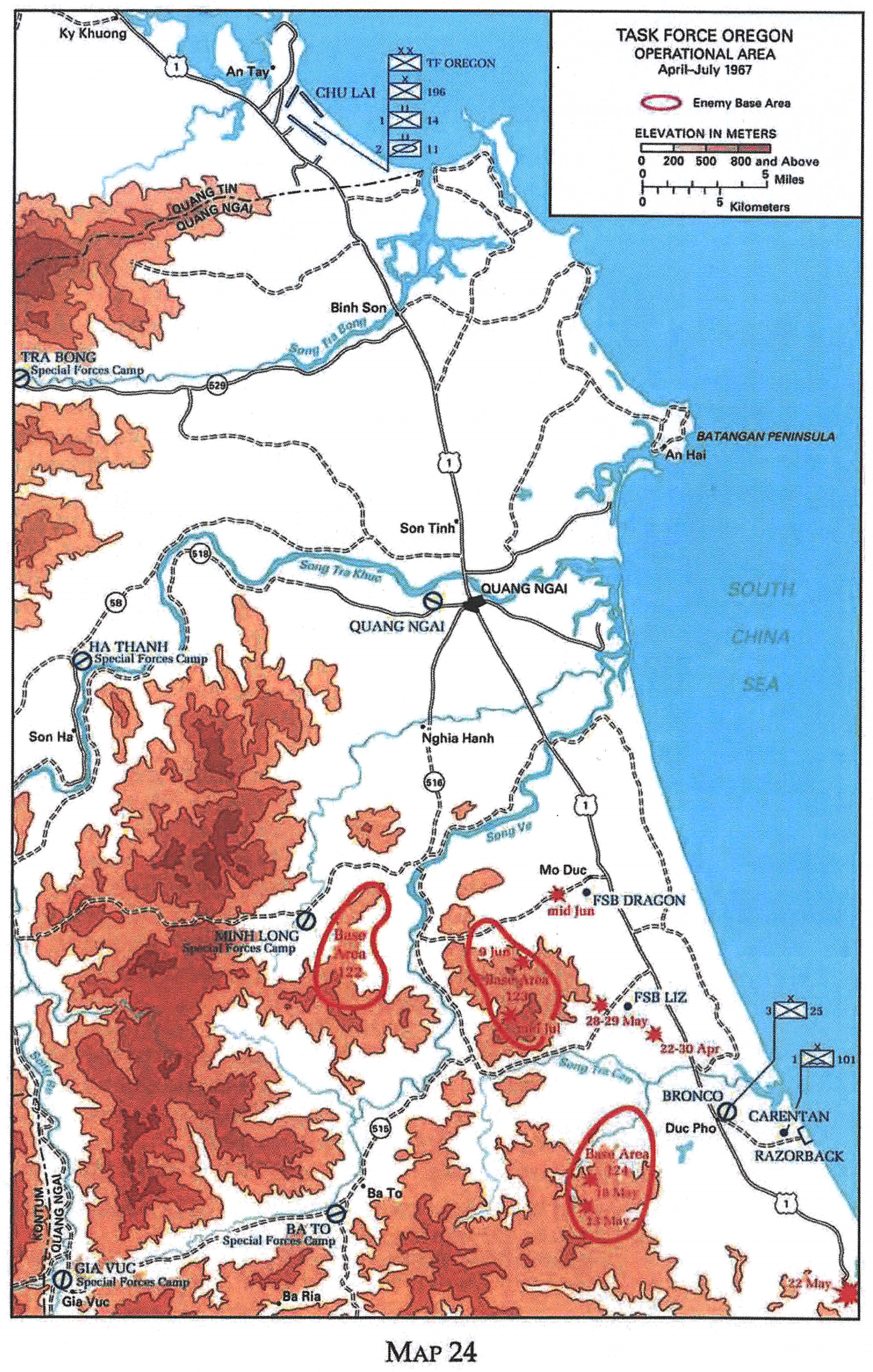
- Task Force Oregon Operational Area April - July 1967
Date	22 April – 31 July 1967
Location	near Đức Phổ District, Quang Ngai Province, South Vietnam

Belligerents
United States	North Vietnam; Viet Cong

Commanders and leaders
William B. Rosson; James Shanahan; George E. Wear	

Units involved
3rd Brigade, 25th Infantry Division	3rd Division

Casualties and losses
97 killed	1,339 killed and 410 weapons recovered
- 19,000 civilians displaced

Operation Baker was a security operation during the Vietnam War conducted by the U.S. 3rd Brigade, 25th Infantry Division from 22 April to 31 July 1967 in the Đức Phổ District of Quang Ngai Province, South Vietnam.

== Background ==
In early April 1967 MACV gave instructions to commence the Task Force Oregon plan, which involved the movement of an Army task force to Đức Phổ and Chu Lai area to allow the 1st Marine Division to move north to Danang to support the 3rd Marine Division in northern I Corps. COMUSMACV General William Westmoreland appointed his chief of staff Major general William B. Rosson to command the unit, designated Oregon after Rosson's home state. Rosson reported directly to III Marine Amphibious Force which controlled I Corps, however he was generally free to manoeuvre his brigades subject to maintaining the defense of Chu Lai Air Base.

Task Force Oregon originally comprised the following units:

- 3rd Brigade, 25th Infantry Division
- 196th Light Infantry Brigade
- 2nd Squadron, 11th Armored Cavalry Regiment (May–August 1967)

The 196th Light Infantry Brigade was given the task of defending Chu Lai, while the 3rd Brigade, 25th Infantry Division commanded by Colonel James Shanahan was given the task of securing Đức Phổ District. When the 3rd Brigade reached Đức Phổ in April, government officials informed him that 80 percent of the district's 94,000 people were either Viet Cong (VC) or VC sympathizers. The South Vietnamese government exercised authority only in a few villages along Highway 1 near the district headquarters. Traditionally, Đức Phổ had served as a rest area for the People's Army of Vietnam (PAVN) 3rd Division, providing both replacements and food. Military stores came from trawlers off the coast, while other key items, such as medical supplies and batteries, were typically purchased in Saigon and shipped to Sa Huỳnh, the small port in the southern part of the district. In March U.S. intelligence learned from a defecting PAVN officer that the 3rd Division was scheduled to spearhead the B1 Front's dry season offensive. According to the officer, a trawler was to deliver a shipment of arms and ammunition from North Vietnam to the mouth of the Tra Cau River, but it had run aground on the Batangan Peninsula. He went on to say that as part of the new offensive, the PAVN 2nd Regiment, which had been inactive in western Đức Phổ since November, was to hit the Ba Tơ Special Forces camp, 30km from the coast. The attack would begin in late April or early May.

== Operation ==
US Army footage from the operation showing US troops after sustaining casualties during a fire fight. They have detain civilians and are putting death cards in the mouths of dead. Film shows VC dead and their weapons.

Shanahan gave the 2nd Battalion, 35th Infantry Regiment, commanded by Lieutenant colonel Clinton E. Granger, the job of securing the Đức Phổ airfield, now renamed Bronco, and the road extending east to Razorback Beach (14.812°N 109.007°E). Granger was also to work the coastal side of Highway 1, concentrating on the Tra Cau corridor, where the VC received supplies by sea. Shanahan's other unit, the 1st Battalion, 35th Infantry, under Major James E. Moore, would operate on the inland side of the highway to screen the brigade's flank.

At first, Moore's units saw most of the action. On the morning of 22 April, Moore's men took fire from a hamlet six kilometers northwest of Bronco. Hoping to cut off the VC, he brought up most of his battalion and by early afternoon had encircled the village. Air strikes drove several civilians out in front of the waiting Americans, who held their fire. When the fighting resumed, Moore's men squeezed the VC into a corner of the hamlet, but before they could finish them off, darkness ended the battle. At first light the Americans attacked, overrunning the dazed VC and taking several prisoners. A sweep through the entire hamlet revealed a sophisticated, fortified complex containing bunkers connected by trenches and tunnels. Amid the rubble, the men counted 33 VC bodies. Through the next week Moore's troops pushed on, fighting small groups of VC almost every day. Twice they ran into fortified villages and fought running battles before pushing out the defenders. On 25 April Specialist Four Kenneth E. Stumpf of Company C, 1/35th Infantry rescued three wounded men and destroyed a VC bunker, actions for which he was later awarded the Medal of Honor. At the same time, Granger's battalion saw action east of Highway 1. By the end of April the two battalions accounted for over 200 VC killed or captured. Most of the casualties were guerrillas, but several prisoners claimed to be 2nd Regiment soldiers who had been detailed to train guerrillas and to handle logistical matters for their regiment bivouacked in the mountains west of Bronco.

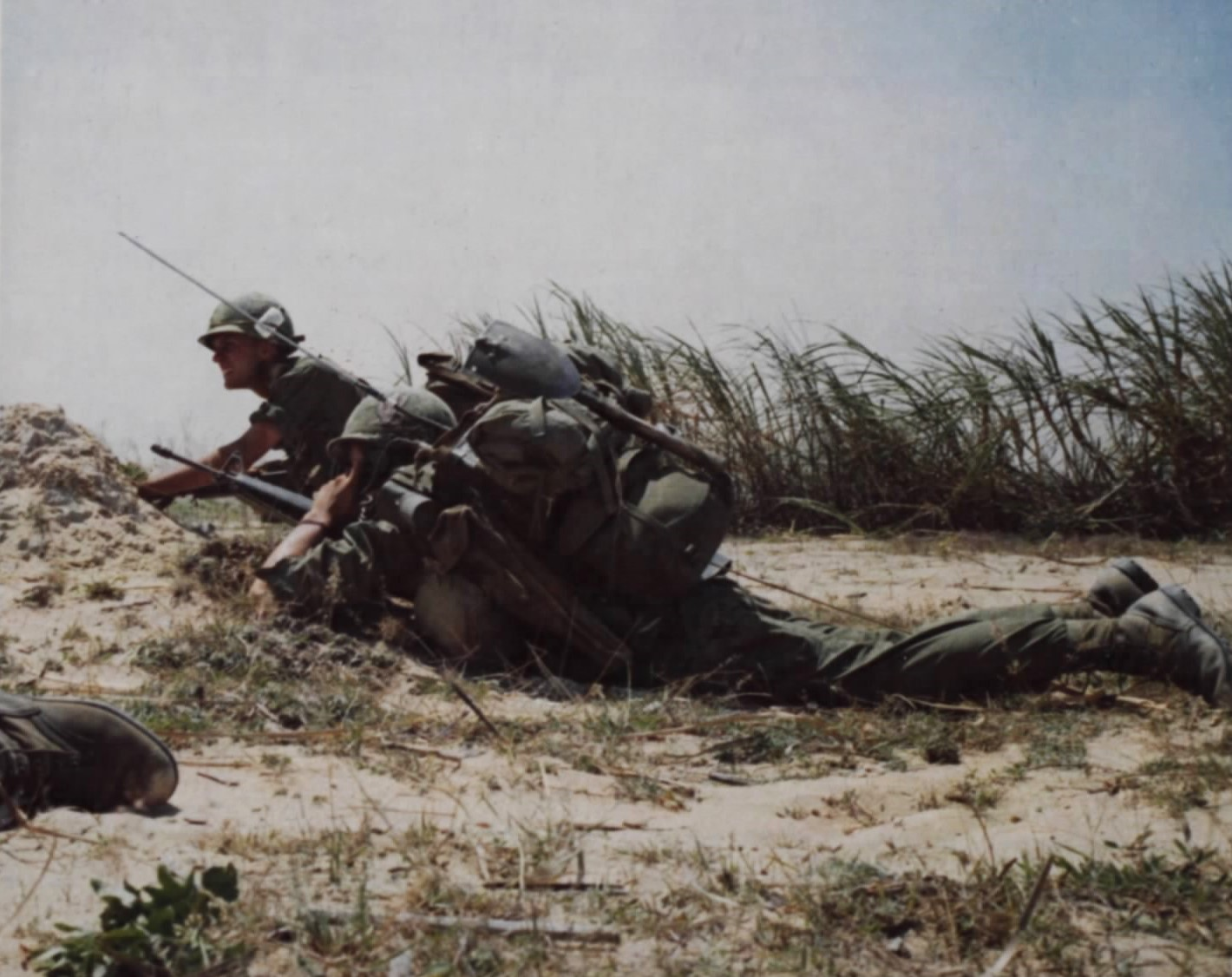
Members of Company C, 2nd Battalion, 35th Infantry Regiment pinned down north of Đức Phổ.jpg

In late April Task Force Oregon received information that the PAVN 3rd Division headquarters had moved north out of Bình Định Province into Quảng Ngãi Province to join its 22nd Regiment. In addition, the 1st Regiment, a 2nd Division unit, was now said to be 25km north of Ba Tơ. The news prompted Rosson to request immediate deployment of the 1st Brigade, 101st Airborne Division. Although this unit was the I Field Force, Vietnam reserve, both Larsen and Westmoreland agreed to its early release and movement by sea from Nha Trang to Razorback. From there, the brigade was to air-assault inland in Operations Malheur I and Malheur II. At the same time, Westmoreland shifted the I Field Force boundary northward so Larsen could use the 1st Cavalry Division against the headquarters of the 3rd Division and the 22nd Regiment in southern Quảng Ngãi. Rosson established a forward command post near Bronco and directed the 196th at Chu Lai to place a battalion on two-hour alert. As these deployments were in progress, Shanahan's battalions prepared for action against the 22nd Regiment. Working from Firebase Olive Drab, 4km west of Bronco, Moore assumed control of the southern portion of the brigade sector, while Granger, reinforced with the brigade's cavalry troop and an attached tank company, took over the northern part, an area expanded to include southern Mộ Đức District. Here Granger established Landing Zone Liz, nine kilometers northwest of Đức Phổ. U.S. commanders knew their actions would be little more than harassment of the enemy to keep them away from the populated areas. Over the next week, Granger's 2/35th Infantry fought VC units daily. On 11 May Granger trapped a VC unit 6km northeast of Liz, overrunning its fortified hamlet as darkness fell. During the next night the VC retaliated with mortars, striking a battery position at Liz, but when they shifted their fire to support a ground attack, rounds landed among their own men, and the assault ended before it began.

On 19 May intelligence reported that an enemy battalion had just occupied a camp in a heavily wooded area, 8km south of Bronco. Although Moore's troops had searched the area a day before without making contact, they found the camp that afternoon, though they failed to encircle it before dark. Moore called in artillery and air strikes throughout the night, and when the Americans moved in the next morning they met only light resistance. Hastily laid communications wire and captured documents indicated a major command post, presumably that of the 22nd Regiment. Two days later, on 22 May, Moore's troops ran into part of the 7th Battalion, 22nd Regiment, in a fortified hamlet along Highway 1, 13km southeast of Bronco. In a fight lasting over twenty-four hours, they killed more than 70 VC and found a cache of more than 100 mortar rounds. The Americans would not encounter the 7th Battalion for another six months. During May 159 VC had rallied to the Government in the Đức Phổ area, whereas in the three months prior to the brigade's arrival there had been three, an indicator of deteriorating morale among the VC.

At midday on 27 May Shanahan received a report indicating that a major enemy unit had established a command post at Tan Phong Hamlet in the Tra Cau Valley, 2km west of Liz. Shanahan passed the information to Granger and, since the 2/35th Infantry, was fully occupied either in defending Liz or in conducting sweeps to the east, provided him with the blue team platoon (aero-rifle infantry) of Troop A, 1st Squadron, 9th Cavalry Regiment, to investigate. The blue team landed in a rice paddy south of Tan Phong. As the helicopters flew away, gunfire crackled from the hamlet, and within minutes the enemy had pinned down the Americans. Before artillery and air support arrived, the enemy tried to flank the blue team, prompting Granger to send his reconnaissance platoon from Liz, followed by an armored cavalry troop, to attack the hamlet from another direction. Sensing that he lacked the manpower to seal off the target, Granger decided to air-assault Company A, which was holding Liz, into a clearing near the action, a risky move since it left Liz virtually unguarded. All three units arrived within the hour. They worked around the north, south and east sides of the hamlet, asking for helicopter gunships to close the hole on the west. Worried about the vulnerability of Liz, Granger wanted to complete the encirclement before dark, or at least to get some new troops into the firebase. Company B was flown in from the coast to bolster the defense of Liz. The next morning the Americans moved in and found that the VC had fled, leaving behind 81 dead. That night Company B and the reconnaissance platoon established four platoon-size ambushes across the entrance to the Tra Cau Valley. Before daylight on 29 May a VC company attacked one of the positions. Although the defenders were hard pressed, they repulsed the assault, and the enemy fled before dawn. From captured documents and from prisoners Granger learned that his men had engaged the 60th Battalion, 1st Regiment. A captured document contained the strengths of American units operating in Quảng Ngãi Province, together with their designations, tactics and plans and also provided a critique of American tactics and instructions on how to exploit their weaknesses.

In early June intelligence reports indicated that the enemy intended to attack the headquarters of Mộ Đức District, 10km north of Liz. Shanahan reacted by extending Granger's operational area north to include the entire Mộ Đức Plain. A new firebase, Dragon (14.95°N 108.88°E), was built next to the district headquarters and manned by an artillery battery provided by Task Force Oregon and an infantry company. The additional soldiers gave Granger the equivalent of six company-size maneuver units. In mid-June, the Americans fought a series of battles within a few kilometers of Dragon. These actions cost the enemy, thought to be of the 1st Regiment from Base Area 123, more than 50 dead. The fights near Liz and Dragon in May and June had confirmed the location of the 1st Regiment, but the whereabouts of the VC 2nd and the PAVN 22nd Regiments remained less certain. Analysts reasoned that one or both regiments had to take some action in Đức Phổ to reestablish local authority and concluded that Bronco was the most likely objective. The enemy struck on 23 June, shortly after midnight 12 minutes of mortar and recoilless rifle fire hit the base, killing 3 Americans, wounding 51 and knocking out an 8-inch howitzer.

In late June intelligence pinpointed a battalion of the 2nd Regiment and two local force battalions around the beaches near the mouth of the Tra Cau. Eager to bring the VC to battle, the new 3rd Brigade commander, Colonel George E. Wear, sent the 2/35th Infantry, after them. For two weeks, Granger's replacement, Lieutenant colonel Norman L. Tiller, searched hamlets and set night ambushes, killing some 30 VC. Finally, on 10 July, a VC prisoner led his captors to a complex of underground hiding places. The skillfully camouflaged positions had eluded detection even when Tiller's men were within feet of them. Tiller's men again searched the hamlets. As Tiller's men became more adept at locating the dugouts, results improved markedly. During the last three weeks of July, at the cost of 9 U.S. killed, Tiller claimed 260 VC killed, 47 captured and 108 weapons seized.

== Aftermath ==
U.S. losses were 97 killed while the US had claimed that PAVN/VC losses per body count claim until the end of July were 1,339 killed and 410 weapons captured.

By the end of July Highway 1 was open throughout the 3rd Brigade sector during daylight, and South Vietnamese officials claimed that the government controlled over half of the Đức Phổ District's population, a 100 percent increase since February. On the other hand, over 70 percent of that increase, some 19,000 people, consisted of refugees-people who either had been forced out of their homes by the allies or had fled the fighting around their hamlets. Except those located near Highway 1, few hamlets remained intact.

According to one source, refugees from the Đức Phổ region were displaced to camps without sanitation, infrastructure and a means to live. In response to Viet Cong attacks on displaced persons camps, US artillery barrages killed many displaced refugees, and undermined ongoing Civil Operations and Rural Development Support efforts.
