= Noncommissioned officer candidate course =

US Army noncommissioned officer candidate program

Noncommissioned Officer Candidate Course
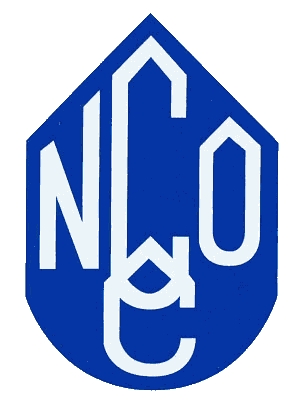
- Active: September 1967 - 1972
- Country: United States
- Branch: United States Army
- Type: Training
- Role: Train and U.S. Army Noncommissioned Officers
- Part of: Continental Army Command; U.S. Army Infantry School

The United States Army's Noncommissioned Officer Candidate Course (NCOCC), originally located at Fort Benning, Georgia, was created to fill the Army's critical shortage of junior noncommissioned officers with the best qualified and best trained men available. NCO Candidates (NCOC) allowed to attend the course were selected from volunteers and many candidates were among the brightest soldiers of Basic Combat Training, Advanced Individual Training or in a subsequent assignment that demonstrated outstanding leadership potential. The program was in existence only during the U.S. war in Vietnam.

== History ==
By the end of 1966, the US military presence in South Vietnam had grown to 385,000 with the majority of soldiers in the US Army. During the Vietnam build-up, many of those doing the fighting were enlistees and draftees as the Reserve forces were not mobilized for this action. Without “calling up” the Army National Guard and the Army Reserve Army, leaders had to induct and train raw talent and to distribute those new recruits and existing personnel worldwide. The size of the active component was not large enough to provide all requirements for the expanded Vietnam commitment and the Army found itself without alternative plans for expanding its strength. The rapid buildup, coupled with a Department of Defense directive that established a 12-month tour of duty in Vietnam made the replacement program a fundamental problem.

In order to meet these unprecedented requirements for NCO leaders the Army developed a solution called Skilled Development Base (SDB) Program on the proven Officer Candidate Course where an enlisted man could attend basic and advanced training, and if recommended or applied for, filled out an application and attended OCS. The thought by some was that the same could be done for noncoms. If a carefully selected soldier can be given 23 weeks of intensive training that would qualify him to lead a platoon, then others can be trained to lead squads and fire teams in the same amount of time. From this seed, the Noncommissioned Officers Candidate Course (NCOC) was born.

In August 1967 the Army established the Skill Development Base (SDB) program of formal instruction and on-the-job training (OJT) to address the Army's shortage of deployable enlisted personnel, and to fill requirements (mostly overseas) for squad and team leaders in pay grades E-5 and E-6 in Vietnam.

When created, it had three sub-programs, the Noncommissioned Officer Candidate (NCOC) Program, the Noncommissioned Officer/Supervisor Program, and the Specialist Program. The expectation was that graduates would be able to perform in their specialty at the grade they were promoted to on their first duty day. The Training Centers were given 24-weeks to accomplish that and the expectation was that students must have at least 13-months remaining on their enlistment contract when they completed all their studies. The NCO Candidate Program was envisioned to relieve the pressure of the shortage of combat leaders.

== Overview ==
The 1965 build-up of United States Army ground forces broadened the conflict in Vietnam. As the war progressed, the attrition of combat, the 12-month tour limit in Vietnam, separations of senior noncommissioned officers and the 25-month stateside stabilization policy began to take a toll on the enlisted force to the point of crisis. Without a call up of the reserve forces, Vietnam became the Regular Army's war, fought by junior leaders. The Army was faced with sending career noncoms back into action sooner or filling the ranks with the most senior PFC or specialist. Field commanders were challenged with understaffed vacancies at base camps, filling various key leadership positions, and providing for replacements. Older and more experienced NCOs, some World War II veterans, were strained by the physical requirements of the methods of jungle fighting. The Army was quickly running out of noncommissioned officers in the combat specialties.

The NCOC course involved an initial 12-week training program at Fort Benning, Georgia, with minimum classroom instruction. The emphasis was on practical training in the field, approximately one-third of which was at night. Three distinct phases of the course were intended to develop the candidate into a noncommissioned officer who could discharge his duties with confidence and competence. At the end of 12 weeks at an NCOC training center, the new NCOs were assigned to Vietnam-oriented training centers for 9 weeks of on-the-job training. During on-the-job training, the NCOs performed in responsible leadership positions such as squad leaders, platoon guides, and assistants. By the career military and older noncoms, graduates were often called "Instant" NCOs" and the men who completed the course were referred to as "Shake 'n Bakes", "Instants", or "Whip 'n Chills" because of the speed in which they made rank.

== Selection criteria ==
1. Security clearance of Confidential.
2. Infantry score of 100 or higher.
3. MOS 11B, skill level 1 and 2 and 11C or 11H at skill level 1, 2, or 3.
4. Grade E-5 or below. (Grade E-5 must have prior approval from USCONARC.)
5. Demonstrated leadership potential.
6. Selected by unit commander.
7. Have 13 or more months remaining in service after completion of course.
8. Be POR qualified for assignment to restricted area.
9. Not on orders for Vietnam when selected-except for former Officer Candidates and AIT graduates who, if selected, will be deleted from existing assignment instructions.
10. Individuals having received accelerated promotions to E-2 were given special consideration.
11. Must be a high school graduate or equivalent. This criterion may be waived based on an aptitude area GT score of 90 or above.

== List of NCOC programs ==
- Armor (Fort Knox, Kentucky)
- Combat Engineer (Fort Leonard Wood, Missouri)
- Field Artillery (Fort Sill, Oklahoma)
- Infantry (Fort Benning, Georgia) [1967 – 1972]
- Light Air Defense Artillery Crewman (Fort Bliss, Texas)
- Signal Corps (Fort Sill, Oklahoma - Fort Knox, Kentucky)

== Modern NCOC ==
In July 1970 during a lull in the NCOC, the Army conducted a pilot program called the 'Basic NCO Course', taught at Ft Sill, Oklahoma. The first Army-wide basic courses began May 1971 and in January 1972 the first two advance courses were taught. By late-1971, NCO Academies began the transition to the Basic Course as part of the newly created NCO Education System (NCOES). In November 1971 the Department of the Army directed that NCOC should end after January 1972. Over its 4 1/2-year existence, the program trained about 33,000 NCOs at the various NCOC locations.

== Medal of Honor awardees ==
SSG Robert J. Pruden, Class 2-69
SSG Hammett Lee Bowen, Jr., Class 4-69
SSG Robert C. Murray, Class 38-69
SGT Lester R. Stone, Jr., Class 37-68

== NCOC Locator ==
A veteran tribute site created for graduates of the Ft. Benning Noncommissioned Officer "Shake n' Bake" course from 1967 to 1972, This site lists information about classes and classmates and there is also information about other NCOC Schools held at Ft. Bliss, Ft. Knox, Ft. Sill, and Ft. Leonard Wood. Online at NCOC Locator.

== See also ==
- Military academy
- Officer Candidate School
- Training and Doctrine Command
- Warrant Officer Candidate School (United States Army)
