= 1952 TANFL season =

Australian rules football season

- Teams: Clarence Kangaroos; New Town Magpies; Hobart Tigers; New Norfolk Eagles; North Hobart Robins; Sandy Bay Seagulls
- Premiers: Sandy Bay
- Minor premiers: Hobart; 3rd minor premiership

Attendance
- Matches played: 49
- Total attendance: 124,281 (2,536 per match)

The 1952 Tasmanian Australian National Football League (TANFL) premiership season was an Australian Rules football competition staged in Hobart, Tasmania over 15 roster rounds and 4 finals series matches between 19 April and 27 September 1952.

== Participating Clubs ==
- Clarence District Football Club
- New Town District Football Club
- Hobart Football Club
- New Norfolk District Football Club
- North Hobart Football Club
- Sandy Bay Football Club

=== 1952 TANFL Club Coaches ===
- Les McClements (Clarence)
- Bill Fox (Glenorchy)
- Bill Tonks (Hobart)
- Arthur Olliver & Cliff Taylor (Stand-In) (New Norfolk)
- Len Mclankie (North Hobart)
- Gordon Bowman (Sandy Bay)

=== TANFL Reserves Grand Final ===
- Clarence 13.13 (91) v Hobart 5.9 (39) – North Hobart Oval

=== TANFL Under-19's Grand Final ===
State Schools Old Boys Football Association (SSOBFA)

- North West 6.9 (45) v Macalburn 6.8 (44) – North Hobart Oval

Note: North West affiliated to North Hobart, Macalburn affiliated to Hobart.

=== Intrastate Matches ===
Jubilee Shield (Saturday, 24 May 1952)

- TANFL 13.16 (94) v NTFA 9.14 (68) – Att: 7,675 at York Park

Jubilee Shield (Saturday, 14 June 1952)

- TANFL 19.17 (131) v NWFU 12.12 (84) – Att: 18,387 at North Hobart Oval *

Note: This match was a curtain raiser to a VFL Premiership fixture between Fitzroy and Melbourne.

Jubilee Shield (Saturday, 5 July 1952)

- TANFL 10.17 (77) v NWFU 4.8 (32) – Att: 6,500 at Devonport Oval

Jubilee Shield (Saturday, 2 August 1952)

- NTFA 13.15 (93) v TANFL 13.12 (90) – Att: 7,063 at North Hobart Oval

=== Leading Goalkickers: TANFL ===
- Ian Westell (Sandy Bay) – 81
- Bernie Waldron (Hobart) – 79
- Les McClements (Clarence) – 49
- Michael Wade (Hobart) – 38
- Rex Garwood (New Town) – 33

=== Medal Winners ===
- Cliff Busch (New Norfolk) – William Leitch Medal
- Joe Whittle (Hobart) – George Watt Medal (Reserves)
- John Cracknell (South East) – V.A Geard Medal (Under-19's)

== 1952 TANFL Ladder ==
Pos	Team	Pld	W	L	D	PF	PA	PP	Pts
1	Hobart	15	13	2	0	1560	960	162.5	52
2	New Town	15	10	5	0	1460	1127	129.5	40
3	Sandy Bay	15	8	7	0	1296	1097	118.1	32
4	Clarence	15	8	7	0	1204	1236	97.4	32
5	North Hobart	15	4	11	0	1028	1292	79.6	16
6	New Norfolk	15	2	13	0	801	1637	48.9	8

=== Round 1 ===
(Saturday, 19 April 1952)

- Sandy Bay 8.11 (59) v Hobart 7.10 (52) – Att: 1,999 at North Hobart Oval
- New Town 9.16 (70) v Nth Hobart 5.8 (38) – Att: 1,523 at New Town Oval
- Clarence 18.12 (120) v New Norfolk 12.11 (83) – Att: 1,476 at Boyer Oval

=== Round 2 ===
(Saturday, 26 April 1952)

- New Town 14.9 (93) v Clarence 11.11 (77) – Att: 4,265 at North Hobart Oval
- Hobart 20.19 (139) v New Norfolk 5.13 (43) – Att: 1,066 at TCA Ground
- Sandy Bay 12.7 (79) v Nth Hobart 7.16 (58) – Att: 1,970 at Queenborough Oval

=== Round 3 ===
(Saturday, 3 May 1952)

- New Town 21.21 (147) v New Norfolk 11.10 (76) – Att: 1,714 at North Hobart Oval
- Hobart 13.10 (88) v Nth Hobart 12.10 (82) – Att: 2,189 at TCA Ground
- Sandy Bay 16.10 (106) v Clarence 11.14 (80) – Att: 3,050 at Queenborough Oval

=== Round 4 ===
(Saturday, 10 May 1952)

- Clarence 14.13 (97) v Nth Hobart 14.10 (94) – Att: 3,119 at North Hobart Oval
- Hobart 15.16 (106) v New Town 9.14 (68) – Att: 2,397 at New Town Oval
- Sandy Bay 26.15 (171) v New Norfolk 10.7 (67) – Att: 1,568 at Boyer Oval

=== Round 5 ===
(Saturday, 17 May 1952)

- Nth Hobart 15.5 (95) v New Norfolk 9.18 (72) – Att: 1,700 at North Hobart Oval
- Hobart 21.18 (144) v Clarence 13.9 (87) – Att: 2,608 at TCA Ground
- Sandy Bay 12.16 (88) v New Town 10.10 (70) – Att: 3,333 at Queenborough Oval

=== Round 6 ===
(Saturday, 31 May 1952)

- New Town 16.10 (106) v Nth Hobart 14.12 (96) – Att: 2,749 at North Hobart Oval
- Hobart 7.12 (54) v Sandy Bay 8.4 (52) – Att: 3,057 at Queenborough Oval
- Clarence 15.27 (117) v New Norfolk 6.9 (45) – Att: 1,023 at Bellerive Oval

=== Round 7 ===
(Saturday, 7 June & Monday, 9 June 1952)

- Clarence 9.13 (67) v New Town 8.11 (59) – Att: 2,793 at TCA Ground *
- Hobart 10.20 (80) v New Norfolk 1.7 (13) – Att: 673 at Boyer Oval
- Sandy Bay 16.17 (113) v Nth Hobart 4.9 (33) – Att: 4,360 at North Hobart Oval (Monday)

Note: The Saturday match was switched from North Hobart to the TCA Ground due to poor ground conditions and inclement weather.

=== Round 8 ===
(Saturday, 21 June 1952)

- Hobart 16.14 (110) v Nth Hobart 4.12 (36) – Att: 1,661 at North Hobart Oval
- New Town 12.19 (91) v New Norfolk 3.9 (27) – Att: 1,051 at New Town Oval
- Sandy Bay 8.9 (57) v Clarence 7.3 (45) – Att: 2,854 at Queenborough Oval

=== Round 9 ===
(Saturday, 12 July 1952)

- New Norfolk 12.9 (81) v Sandy Bay 8.13 (61) – Att: 1,192 at North Hobart Oval
- Hobart 12.25 (97) v New Town 13.14 (92) – Att: 2,411 at TCA Ground
- Nth Hobart 10.20 (80) v Clarence 9.9 (63) – Att: 1,360 at Bellerive Oval

Note: This round was postponed on 28 June due to poor ground conditions and inclement weather.

=== Round 10 ===
(Saturday, 19 July 1952)

- New Town 20.8 (128) v Sandy Bay 13.9 (87) – Att: 3,625 at North Hobart Oval
- Hobart 11.17 (83) v Clarence 9.9 (63) – Att: 1,270 at Bellerive Oval
- New Norfolk 7.17 (59) v Nth Hobart 6.10 (46) – Att: 1,476 at Boyer Oval

=== Round 11 ===
(Saturday, 26 July 1952)

- Clarence 7.14 (56) v New Norfolk 5.9 (39) – Att: 2,112 at North Hobart Oval
- Hobart 17.8 (110) v Sandy Bay 14.16 (100) – Att: 2,105 at TCA Ground
- New Town 18.16 (124) v Nth Hobart 14.9 (93) – Att: 1,550 at New Town Oval

=== Round 12 ===
(Saturday, 9 August 1952)

- Nth Hobart 10.11 (71) v Sandy Bay 9.12 (66) – Att: 2,290 at North Hobart Oval
- Hobart 23.18 (156) v New Norfolk 6.12 (48) – Att: 848 at TCA Ground
- Clarence 8.25 (73) v New Town 7.17 (59) – Att: 1,934 at Bellerive Oval

=== Round 13 ===
(Saturday, 16 August 1952)

- Clarence 10.10 (70) v Sandy Bay 9.15 (69) – Att: 3,507 at North Hobart Oval
- Hobart 13.22 (100) v Nth Hobart 5.10 (40) – Att: 1,449 at TCA Ground
- New Town 19.16 (130) v New Norfolk 8.11 (59) – Att: 986 at Boyer Oval

=== Round 14 ===
(Saturday, 23 August 1952)

- New Town 13.9 (87) v Hobart 11.17 (83) – Att: 4,028 at North Hobart Oval
- Clarence 15.9 (99) v Nth Hobart 8.19 (67) – Att: 1,065 at TCA Ground
- Sandy Bay 19.11 (125) v New Norfolk 6.9 (45) – Att: 1,113 at Queenborough Oval

=== Round 15 ===
(Saturday, 30 August 1952)

- Nth Hobart 15.9 (99) v New Norfolk 6.10 (46) – Att: 694 at North Hobart Oval
- Hobart 25.8 (158) v Clarence 13.12 (90) – Att: 1,483 at TCA Ground *
- New Town 20.15 (135) v Sandy Bay 8.12 (60) – Att: 3,368 at New Town Oval

Note: Bernie Waldron (Hobart) equals the TANFL record with 15.3, also a Hobart club record.

=== First Semi Final ===
(Saturday, 6 September 1952)

- Sandy Bay: 4.1 (25) | 5.5 (35) | 10.8 (68) | 13.11 (89)
- Clarence: 4.6 (30) | 5.8 (38) | 6.11 (47) | 8.11 (59)
- Attendance: 6,521 at North Hobart Oval

=== Second Semi Final ===
(Saturday, 13 September 1952)

- Hobart: 3.3 (21) | 7.6 (48) | 11.7 (73) | 15.11 (101)
- New Town: 2.1 (13) | 6.4 (40) | 8.7 (55) | 9.12 (66)
- Attendance: 8,592 at North Hobart Oval

=== Preliminary Final ===
(Saturday, 20 September 1952)

- Sandy Bay: 4.3 (27) | 6.4 (40) | 11.6 (72) | 13.6 (84)
- New Town: 2.3 (15) | 3.7 (25) | 5.7 (37) | 5.10 (40)
- Attendance: 4,218 at North Hobart Oval

=== Grand Final ===
(Saturday, 27 September 1952)

- Sandy Bay: 3.5 (23) | 4.7 (31) | 10.7 (67) | 14.9 (93)
- Hobart: 2.2 (14) | 8.3 (51) | 10.7 (67) | 11.9 (75)
- Attendance: 11,086 at North Hobart Oval

Source: All scores and statistics courtesy of the Hobart Mercury publication.
