= Steven Febey =

Australian rules footballer

Personal information
- Born: 19 August 1969 (age 57)
- Original team: Devonport (TFL)
- Draft: No. 3, 1986 national draft
- Height: 184 cm (6 ft 0 in)
- Weight: 82 kg (181 lb)

Playing career^{1}
Years	Club	Games (Goals)
1987–2001	Melbourne	258 (40)

Representative team honours
Years	Team	Games (Goals)
1989 & 1993	Tasmania	2 (0)
1990	Victoria	1 (0)
1995	Allies	1 (0)
- ^{1} Playing statistics correct to the end of 2001.

Career highlights
- 3rd 1998 Best and Fairest; 1989 Pre-season premiership side; 1997 Melbourne Life Member

Steven Febey (born 19 August 1969) is a former Australian rules football player for the Melbourne Football Club from Devonport. He is the twin brother of Matthew Febey beside whom he played for most of his career.

Febey debuted in 1988 and was a regular in the team throughout the 1990s, wearing guernsey number 21. During the 2001 season he was dropped from the side but came back strongly to finish fourth in the best and fairest.

When he retired in 2002 with 258 games to his name he held the record for most appearances by a player selected in the national draft. He fell just short of Robert Flower's club record of 272 games and as of 2007 only four people have played more games for the Demons

After the 2002 season, Febey went to Bali with his teammates and was caught up in the bombings which devastated the island. Standing beside former Demons player Steven Armstrong and David Robbins, Febey was about to enter the Sari Club when the car bomb exploded. He escaped with just minor injuries.

He was the only Demon to play in both the 1988 and 2000 losing grand final teams.

== Statistics ==
Legend
G	Goals	K	Kicks	D	Disposals	T	Tackles
B	Behinds	H	Handballs	M	Marks

Season	Team	No.	Games	Totals							Averages (per game)						
Season	Team	No.	Games	G	B	K	H	D	M	T	G	B	K	H	D	M	T
1988	Melbourne	21	12	1	7	91	23	114	24	9	0.1	0.6	7.6	1.9	9.5	2.0	0.8
1989	Melbourne	21	20	3	1	252	86	338	73	26	0.2	0.1	12.6	4.3	16.9	3.7	1.3
1990	Melbourne	21	23	6	9	256	80	336	77	26	0.3	0.4	11.1	3.5	14.6	3.3	1.1
1991	Melbourne	21	19	3	8	220	68	288	69	35	0.2	0.4	11.6	3.6	15.2	3.6	1.8
1992	Melbourne	21	14	2	2	121	81	202	44	21	0.1	0.1	8.6	5.8	14.4	3.1	1.5
1993	Melbourne	21	20	2	5	258	179	437	57	22	0.1	0.3	12.9	9.0	21.9	2.9	1.1
1994	Melbourne	21	25	3	4	301	154	455	66	43	0.1	0.2	12.0	6.2	18.2	2.6	1.7
1995	Melbourne	21	22	2	4	287	107	394	95	23	0.1	0.2	13.0	4.9	17.9	4.3	1.0
1996	Melbourne	21	5	0	0	38	24	62	10	5	0.0	0.0	7.6	4.8	12.4	2.0	1.0
1997	Melbourne	21	20	2	6	215	132	347	51	23	0.1	0.3	10.8	6.6	17.4	2.6	1.2
1998	Melbourne	21	25	7	3	309	191	500	77	60	0.3	0.1	12.4	7.6	20.0	3.1	2.4
1999	Melbourne	21	12	0	2	125	73	198	33	16	0.0	0.2	10.4	6.1	16.5	2.8	1.3
2000	Melbourne	21	21	2	4	239	124	363	55	38	0.1	0.2	11.4	5.9	17.3	2.6	1.8
2001	Melbourne	21	20	7	2	207	153	360	67	38	0.4	0.1	10.4	7.7	18.0	3.4	1.9
Career			258	40	57	2919	1475	4394	798	385	0.2	0.2	11.3	5.7	17.0	3.1	1.5
