= Dominic Fotia =

Australian rules footballer

Personal information
- Full name: Dominic Fotia
- Born: 9 December 1969 (age 56)
- Original team: West Torrens
- Draft: No. 12, 1986 national draft
- Height: 178 cm (5 ft 10 in)
- Weight: 73 kg (161 lb)
- Position: Half forward flank

Playing career^{1}
| Years | Club | Games (Goals) |
| 1989–1991 | Carlton | 18 (4) |
- ^{1} Playing statistics correct to the end of 1991.

Dominic Fotia (born 9 December 1969) is a former Australian rules footballer who played with Carlton in the Australian Football League (AFL). Originally from West Torrens in the South Australian National Football League (SANFL), Fotia was in and out of the senior Blues team during his time with Carlton. His best performance was in a round 13 match in 1990, where Fotia had 23 possessions and was awarded three Brownlow Medal votes as the best player on the ground. However, he was unable to consistently find that level of form and he was delisted at the end of 1991. Fotia spent the next two seasons in the Victorian Football Association (VFA), playing for Coburg and Werribee, before returning to South Australia.
