= Chris Duthy =

Australian rules footballer

Personal information
- Born: 19 June 1961 (age 65)
- Original team: South Broken Hill
- Draft: No. 37, 1986 national draft
- Height: 188 cm (6 ft 2 in)
- Weight: 83 kg (183 lb)

Playing career^{1}
Years	Club	Games (Goals)
1982–1986	Glenelg	
1987	Fitzroy	3 (0)
1988–1992	Glenelg	201 (21)
- ^{1} Playing statistics correct to the end of 1992.

Chris Duthy (born 19 June 1961) is a former Australian rules footballer who played with Glenelg in the South Australian National Football League (SANFL) and Fitzroy in the Victorian Football League (VFL).

Duthy, who played his early football in Broken Hill, was a defender. He was an established player at Glenelg by the time he was recruited to the VFL, having been the full-back in their 1985 and 1986 premiership teams.

Selected by Fitzroy with the 37th pick of the 1986 Draft, Duthy appeared in the first three rounds of the 1987 VFL season but was unable to play any more games for the club due to injury.

He finished his career back in the SANFL and brought up his 200th league appearance for Glenelg in the 1992 finals series. He then played in his fifth grand final for Glenelg but was on the losing for the third time and retired from football.
