= Robin McKinnon =

Australian rules footballer

Personal information
- Full name: Robin Michael Pete McKinnon
- Born: 19 December 1961 (age 64)
- Original team: South Gambier
- Draft: No. 52, 1986 VFL draft, Hawthorn

Playing career^{1}
| Years | Club | Games (Goals) |
| 1983-1996 | West Adelaide (SANFL) | 259 (0) |
| Total | | 259 (0) |

Representative team honours
| Years | Team | Games (Goals) |
| 1984 | South Australia | 1 |
- ^{1} Playing statistics correct to the end of 1996.

Career highlights
- West Adelaide premiership 1983; West Adelaide Hall of Fame Inaugural Inductee 2005; West Adelaide Life Member 1989; SANFL Player Life Member 1995

Robin McKinnon (born 19 December 1961) is a former Australian rules footballer who played for West Adelaide in the South Australian National Football League (SANFL). McKinnon was selected by Hawthorn with pick 52 in the 1986 VFL draft, but did not move to Victoria and join the Hawthorn squad.
