= 1986 VFL draft =

Draft for the Victorian Football League

The 1986 VFL draft was the third formal draft to provide recruitment opportunities to clubs participating in Australian rules football's elite Victorian Football League. Held on 26 November 1986 after the end of the 1986 VFL season, it consisted only of the national draft itself, without a subsequent rookie or pre-season draft. It was the first draft to be held since two initial drafts in 1981 and 1982, and as drafts have been held every year since, it is considered to be the first of the modern drafts.

== National draft ==
All twelve established clubs, along with one of the two teams set to debut in the competition, the Brisbane Bears, were given one pick in each of the five rounds, a total of 65 overall. Brisbane received the first selection in every round, and six pre-draft selections, as well as complete access to all players from Queensland.

The other new side, West Coast, was also granted similarly exclusive home-state rights. However, with the superior range of players available from the West Australian Football League (WAFL), the club was excluded from the draft.

The order of the remaining picks was set in the reverse of the previous season's finishing positions.

In addition, the established Victorian clubs maintained sole recruitment options on players from the relevant Metropolitan and, for the last time, Country Zones. This meant that even before the draft had started, the most sought-after footballers from Victoria were already signed, and therefore unavailable for selection.

The restricted pool of available draftees meant the majority of those chosen in the 1986 national draft came from South Australian and Tasmanian clubs. Meanwhile, although the minimum age for eligible players was 16, many were actually into their twenties, unlike the contemporary teenage selections. Also of note is the significant number of those picked either did not join the club that selected them at all, or at least did not do so straight away. Players were aligned to their drafted club for three years, but could choose to remain playing for their current club outside of the VFL.

A prime example was the number one draft pick, Martin Leslie. Leslie served out the remaining two years of his contract with South Australian National Football League (SANFL) club Port Adelaide, winning All-Australian honours at the 1988 Adelaide Bicentennial Carnival in the process. Only then did he move to Brisbane, making his debut as a 26-year-old in 1989, winning the club's best-and-fairest twice and going on to play 107 games until his retirement in 1995. In contrast, the second selection overall, the similarly aged Steven Sims, opted to stay in the SANFL rather than join the St Kilda Football Club.

Many of the 1986 draftees never played in a senior VFL/AFL match, including 4 of the top 10 selections and all of Geelong and St Kilda's picks. Several did go on to make their name as footballers, among them Melbourne's Steven Febey and Darrin Pritchard of Hawthorn. However, the most notable of the draft's recruits was Alastair Lynch, picked by Fitzroy at number 50 overall, who eventually passed the major milestone of 300 appearances, which included three victorious Grand Finals with the Brisbane Lions.

=== Pre-draft selections ===
Player	Drafted to	Recruited from	League	Games with new team
Matthew Campbell	Brisbane Bears	North Adelaide	SANFL	79
Stephen Connelly	Brisbane Bears	Central District	SANFL	0
Ben Harris	Brisbane Bears	Port Adelaide	SANFL	14
Neil Hein	Brisbane Bears	Norwood	SANFL	15
Colin McDonald	Brisbane Bears	Woodville	SANFL	0
Mark Mickan	Brisbane Bears	West Adelaide	SANFL	48

=== National draft selections ===
Round	Pick	Player	Drafted to	Recruited from	League	Games with new team
1	1	Martin Leslie	Brisbane Bears	Port Adelaide	SANFL	107
1	2	Steven Sims	St Kilda	West Torrens	SANFL	0
1	3	Steven Febey	Melbourne	Devonport	TFLSL	258
1	4	Richard Anderson	Richmond	Norwood	SANFL	0
1	5	Michael Taylor	Geelong	Port Fairy	Hampden FL	0
1	6	Richard Cousins	Footscray	Central District	SANFL	60
1	7	Chris Lindsay	North Melbourne	West Torrens	SANFL	0
1	8	Grantley Fielke	Collingwood	West Adelaide	SANFL	16
1	9	Andrew Payze	Essendon	West Torrens	SANFL	0
1	10	John Brinkkotter	Sydney	Barooga	Picola & District FL	5
1	11	Jason Taylor	Fitzroy	New Norfolk	TFLSL	7
1	12	Dominic Fotia	Carlton	West Torrens	SANFL	18
1	13	Clayton Lamb	Hawthorn	West Adelaide	SANFL	0
2	14	Scott Adams	Brisbane Bears	Clarence	TFLSL	0
2	15	Andrew Wickham	St Kilda	Latrobe	North West FU	0
2	16	Matthew Febey	Melbourne	Devonport	TFLSL	143
2	17	Trent Nichols	Richmond	Sandy Bay	TFLSL	75
2	18	Mark O'Keeffe	Geelong	Warrnambool	Hampden FL	0
2	19	Matthew Mansfield	Footscray	Glenorchy	TFLSL	32
2	20	Brenton Harris	North Melbourne	South Adelaide	SANFL	2
2	21	David Robertson	Collingwood	North Adelaide	SANFL	17
2	22	Kieran Sporn	Essendon	West Adelaide	SANFL	72
2	23	Lyndon Dakin	Sydney	Longford	Northern Tasmanian FA	0
2	24	Matthew Armstrong	Fitzroy	Hobart	TFLSL	132
2	25	Doug Smart	Carlton	North Adelaide	SANFL	0
2	26	Darrin Pritchard	Hawthorn	Sandy Bay	TFLSL	211
3	27	Adam Garton	Brisbane Bears	Glenelg	SANFL	3
3	28	Darren Mansell	St Kilda	Penola	Western Border FL	0
3	29	Craig Walker	Melbourne	North Hobart	TFLSL	0
3	30	Matthew Sexton	Richmond	Sandhurst	Bendigo FL	0
3	31	Glen Keast	Geelong	North Gambier	Western Border FL	0
3	32	Wayne Mahney	Footscray	Port Adelaide	SANFL	0
3	33	Malcolm Shippen	North Melbourne	Moulamein	Kerang & District FL	0
3	34	Craig Kelly	Collingwood	Norwood	SANFL	122
3	35	Peter Reid	Essendon	Sturt	SANFL	0
3	36	Donald Thompson	Sydney	Albury	OMNFL	0
3	37	Chris Duthy	Fitzroy	Glenelg	SANFL	3
3	38	Simon Minton-Connell	Carlton	North Hobart	TFLSL	19
3	39	Matthew Queen	Hawthorn	Glenorchy	TFLSL	0
4	40	Stephen Williams	Brisbane Bears	Port Adelaide	SANFL	4
4	41	Brett Jaffray	St Kilda	Latrobe	NWFU	0
4	42	Anthony Lovell	Melbourne	Glenorchy	TFLSL	0
4	43	Andrew Gray	Richmond	St Patricks	APS	0
4	44	Tim Britt	Geelong	Dunnstown	Central Highlands FL	0
4	45	James Pyke	Footscray	Norwood	SANFL	0
4	46	Gary Brooker	North Melbourne	Casterton	Western Border FL	0
4	47	Brendan Hogan	Collingwood	Assumption College	APS	0
4	48	Stephen Riley	Essendon	North Adelaide	SANFL	0
4	49	Craig Elias	Sydney	Eastlake	ACTFL	0
4	50	Alastair Lynch	Fitzroy	Hobart	TFLSL	120
4	51	Andrew Hering	Carlton	Wynyard	North West FU	0
4	52	Robin McKinnon	Hawthorn	West Adelaide	SANFL	0
5	53	Michael Templeton	Brisbane Bears	Woodville	SANFL	0
5	54	Paul Page	St Kilda	Kennington	Bendigo FL	0
5	55	Darren Jarman	Melbourne	North Adelaide	SANFL	0
5	56	Greg Whittlesea	Richmond	Sturt	SANFL	0
5	57	Michael Billman	Geelong	Boort	North Central FL	0
5	58	Perry Meka	Footscray	Lemnos	Goulburn Valley FL	0
5	59	Wayne Morrissey	North Melbourne	Northern Districts	Warrnambool	0
5	60	Wayne Tanner	Collingwood	Norwood	SANFL	0
5	61	Andrew Underwood	Essendon	Sturt	SANFL	12
5	62	Laurie Menhenut	Sydney	Tocumwal	Murray FL	0
5	63	Peter Winter	Fitzroy	West Adelaide	SANFL	0
5	64	Darren Newlan	Carlton	Golden Square	Bendigo FL	0
5	65	Tony Symonds	Hawthorn	Glenelg	SANFL	3
