= Noel Taylor (footballer) =

Australian rules footballer (1943–2019)

Personal information
- Full name: Noel Taylor
- Born: 17 March 1943
- Died: 15 May 2019 (aged 76)
- Original team: New Norfolk
- Height: 188 cm (6 ft 2 in)
- Weight: 92 kg (203 lb)

Playing career^{1}
Years	Club	Games (Goals)
1965	Hawthorn	1 (0)
- ^{1} Playing statistics correct to the end of 1965.

Noel Taylor (17 March 1943 – 15 May 2019) was an Australian rules footballer who played with Hawthorn in the Victorian Football League (VFL).

== Family ==
The second of three generations of VFL/AFL footballers: his father was Cliff "Beau" Taylor, and his son was Jason Taylor.

== See also ==
- List of Australian rules football families
