= Cliff Taylor (Australian footballer) =

Australian rules footballer (1914–1986)

Personal information
- Full name: Herbert Clifford Taylor
- Born: 6 April 1914; Geelong, Victoria
- Died: 22 November 1986 (aged 72); New Norfolk, Tasmania
- Original team: Newtown
- Height: 180 cm (5 ft 11 in)
- Weight: 81 kg (179 lb)

Playing career^{1}
Years	Club	Games (Goals)
1938	Geelong	10 (0)
- ^{1} Playing statistics correct to the end of 1938.

Herbert Clifford "Cliff" Taylor (6 April 1914 – 22 November 1986) was an Australian rules footballer who played with Geelong in the Victorian Football League (VFL). He was also known as "Beau" Taylor.

== Family ==
The third son of Henry Beaumont Taylor (1882-1954), and Millicent Ann Colvard Taylor (1882-1930), née Wilks, Herbert Clifford Taylor was born at Geelong, Victoria on 6 April 1914.

He married Eileen Teresa Hedley (1916-2002) on 24 December 1940. He was the father of former Hawthorn player Noel Taylor, and the grandfather of Jason Taylor, who played for three AFL clubs.

== Football ==
=== Geelong (VFL) ===
Taylor, who arrived from Newtown in 1933, was a fullback in the Geelong second's 1937 premiership team.

He got his chance in the senior side in 1938, when he made 10 appearances.

=== North Hobart ===
In 1940 he began playing for North Hobart. He was a member of North Hobart's 1940 and 1941 Tasmanian State Premierships.

=== New Norfolk ===
Appointed coach of New Norfolk in 1945, Taylor led the club to a Southern District Association premiership in his first season. He was captain-coach again in 1946 and the following year New Norfolk were admitted into the Tasmanian Australian National Football League, but they went for former Fitzroy player Arthur Edwards as coach. He did however act as caretaker coach in the 1952 TANFL season, when regular coach Arthur Olliver had to stand down as his wife was ill.

== Death ==
He died at New Norfolk, Tasmania on 22 November 1986.

== See also ==
- List of Australian rules football families
