= Adam Garton =

Australian rules footballer (born 1962)

Personal information
- Full name: Adam Garton
- Born: 17 January 1962 (age 64)
- Original team: Glenelg (SANFL)
- Draft: No. 27, 1986 national draft
- Height: 194 cm (6 ft 4 in)
- Weight: 94 kg (207 lb)

Playing career^{1}
Years	Club	Games (Goals)
1982–1986 & 1989	Glenelg	90 (72)
1987–1988	Brisbane Bears	3 (1)
- ^{1} Playing statistics correct to the end of 1989.

Adam Garton (born 17 January 1962) is a former Australian rules footballer who played with the Brisbane Bears in the Victorian Football League (VFL).

Originally from ACT AFL club West Canberra, Garton was a member of Glenelg's back to back South Australian National Football League (SANFL) premiership winning teams in 1985 and 1986. He contributed four goals in their 1985 grand final win over North Adelaide.

Garton joined Brisbane for their inaugural VFL season in 1987, having been picked up from Glenelg with the 27th selection of the 1986 VFL Draft. Garton, now aged 25, made his league debut in a 103-point loss to Carlton and during the match kicked his only VFL goal. He appeared again the following week when the Bears met the Sydney Swans at Carrara but would have to wait until 1988 to play his third and final game, against Melbourne on the MCG.

After leaving the Bears, Garton returned to Glenelg for one season before moving back to Queensland and has been involved with the Southport Australian Football Club as both a board member and interchange steward. Garton runs an architecture firm in Brisbane.
