= Lester R. Stone Jr. =

Lester Raymond Stone Jr.
- Army Medal of Honor
- Born: June 4, 1947; Binghamton, New York, US
- Died: March 3, 1969 (aged 21) near Landing Zone Liz, Quảng Ngãi Province, Republic of Vietnam
- Burial place: Chenango Valley Cemetery, Binghamton, New York
- Military career
- Allegiance: United States
- Branch: United States Army
- Service years: 1967–1969
- Rank: Sergeant
- Units: 1st Platoon, Company B, 1st Battalion, 20th Infantry Regiment, 11th Infantry Brigade, Americal Division
- Conflicts: Vietnam War †
- Awards: Medal of Honor; Purple Heart

Lester Raymond Stone Jr. (June 4, 1947 – March 3, 1969) was a United States Army soldier and a recipient of the United States military's highest decoration—the Medal of Honor—for his actions in the Vietnam War.

== Biography ==
Stone joined the Army from Syracuse, New York in 1967, and by March 3, 1969, was serving as a Sergeant in 1st Platoon, Company B, 1st Battalion, 20th Infantry Regiment, 11th Infantry Brigade, 23d Infantry Division (Americal). On that day, west of Landing Zone Liz in the Republic of Vietnam, he manned a machine gun from an exposed position during an intense enemy attack, allowing SSG Joaquin Garcia to rescue a wounded comrade.

His mother Doris lent the medal to U.S. Army officer and NASA astronaut Douglas H. Wheelock to take on his June 2010 launch to the International Space Station.

== Medal of Honor citation ==
Sergeant Stone's official Medal of Honor citation reads:

For conspicuous gallantry and intrepidity in action at the risk of his life above and beyond the call of duty. Sgt. Stone, distinguished himself while serving as squad leader of the 1st Platoon. The 1st Platoon was on a combat patrol mission just west of Landing Zone Liz when it came under intense automatic weapons and grenade fire from a well concealed company-size force of North Vietnamese regulars. Observing the platoon machinegunner fall critically wounded, Sgt. Stone remained in the exposed area to provide cover fire for the wounded soldier who was being pulled to safety by another member of the platoon. With enemy fire impacting all around him, Sgt. Stone had a malfunction in the machinegun, preventing him from firing the weapon automatically. Displaying extraordinary courage under the most adverse conditions, Sgt. Stone repaired the weapon and continued to place on the enemy positions effective suppressive fire which enabled the rescue to be completed. In a desperate attempt to overrun his position, an enemy force left its cover and charged Sgt. Stone. Disregarding the danger involved, Sgt. Stone rose to his knees and began placing intense fire on the enemy at pointblank range, killing 6 of the enemy before falling mortally wounded. His actions of unsurpassed valor were a source of inspiration to his entire unit, and he was responsible for saving the lives of a number of his fellow soldiers. His actions were in keeping with the highest traditions of the military profession and reflect great credit on him, his unit, and the U.S. Army.

== See also ==
- List of Medal of Honor recipients for the Vietnam War
