= Trent Nichols =

Australian rules footballer

Personal information
- Born: 7 April 1969 (age 57)
- Original team: Sandy Bay
- Draft: No. 17, 1986 national draft
- Height: 173 cm (5 ft 8 in)
- Weight: 77 kg (170 lb)

Playing career^{1}
Years	Club	Games (Goals)
1988–1991	Richmond	56 (46)
1992	West Coast	4 (3)
1994–1996	North Melbourne	33 (39)
1997–1998	Richmond	19 (19)
Total		112 (107)
- ^{1} Playing statistics correct to the end of 1998.

Trent Nichols (born 7 April 1969) is a former Australian rules footballer who played for Richmond, West Coast and North Melbourne in the Australian Football League.

Nichols was picked up by Richmond with pick 17 in the 1986 VFL Draft but didn't debut until the 1988 season. In the 1990 Brownlow Medal count he finished with the most votes by a Richmond player. He crossed to West Coast in 1992 but struggled to find a place in the side, managing just 4 games during his stint in Perth. North Melbourne signed him for the 1994 season but by 1996 was playing in the reserves, winning that year's Gardiner Medal. He played in three consecutive reserves premierships: with North Melbourne in 1995 and 1996, then with Richmond in 1997.
