= Matthew Febey =

Australian rules footballer

Personal information
- Born: 19 August 1969 (age 57)
- Original teams: Devonport, Rochester
- Draft: No. 16, 1986 national draft
- Debut: Round 15, 1992, Melbourne vs. Fitzroy, at the MCG
- Height: 184 cm (6 ft 0 in)
- Weight: 82 kg (181 lb)

Playing career^{1}
Years	Club	Games (Goals)
1987;1990–2000	Melbourne	143 (44)
- ^{1} Playing statistics correct to the end of 2000.

Matthew Febey (born 19 August 1969) is a former Australian rules footballer who played for Melbourne in the Australian Football League (AFL) during the 1990s.

== Career ==
Originally from Devonport, Febey was drafted to Melbourne in 1986 but suffered from injuries and before he made his senior debut got delisted. He nominated for the draft again in 1992 and was picked up mid-season by Melbourne from his then club Rochester. Almost immediately he made his debut and established a place in the side, often on the wing. An inaccurate kick at goal, his 44 career goals were surpassed by his 60 behinds.

When Febey played his 100th AFL game in 1997, he and his twin brother Steven Febey became the first pair of twins in the history of the league to both achieve the feat. He appeared in six finals matches during his career, including the Preliminary Finals of 1994 and 1998.

After managing just two games in 2000 due to hamstring and finger injuries, he announced his retirement.
