= Simon Minton-Connell =

Australian rules footballer, born 1969

Personal information
- Born: 26 April 1969 (age 57)
- Original team: North Hobart
- Draft: No. 38, 1986 national draft
- Debut: Round 15, 1989, Carlton vs. Collingwood, at Waverley Park
- Height: 194 cm (6 ft 4 in)
- Weight: 92 kg (203 lb)

Playing career^{1}
Years	Club	Games (Goals)
1986–1991	Carlton	19 (50)
1992–1994	Sydney	46 (169)
1995–1996	Hawthorn	22 (33)
1997–1998	Western Bulldogs	25 (53)
Total		112 (305)
- ^{1} Playing statistics correct to the end of 1998.

Career highlights
- Sydney Leading goalkicker 1992, 1993, 1994; Western Bulldogs Leading goalkicker 1997; Tasmanian State of Origin representative; Tasmanian Team of the Century nominee

Simon Minton-Connell (born 26 April 1969) is a former professional Australian rules footballer who played in the Victorian Football League (VFL) and Australian Football League (AFL).

== VFL/AFL career ==
Nephew of the great full-forward Peter Hudson and cousin of Paul Hudson, Minton-Connell was selected at pick 38 in the 1986 VFL Draft by Carlton Football Club. Minton-Connell eventually played for four different VFL/AFL clubs; Carlton, Sydney, Hawthorn and Western Bulldogs in his twelve-year career, amassing 112 games and 305 goals in the process. Despite this lack of career stability Minton-Connell was an effective forward judged by today's standards, despite being overshadowed by the more glamorous and prolific spearheads of the era. He played for Sydney during a three-year period from 1992 until 1994 when the club won three consecutive wooden spoons, leading the club's goalkicking each year. He led the VFL/AFL reserves in goalkicking in 1989, with 69 goals, and in his final season in 1998, with 59 goals.

== Local league career ==
Retiring to local league football, Minton-Connell reached the 100-goal milestone for the Aberfeldie Football Club of the Essendon District Football League in 2002, ending the season with 121 majors after tearing a thigh muscle in the opening minutes of that year's Grand Final versus Oak Park.
