= Jason Taylor (Australian rules footballer) =

Australian rules footballer, born 1968

Personal information
- Full name: Jason Taylor
- Born: 23 September 1968 (age 58)
- Original team: New Norfolk (TANFL)
- Draft: No.11, 1986 national draft
- Height: 196 cm (6 ft 5 in)
- Weight: 96 kg (212 lb)

Playing career^{1}
Years	Club	Games (Goals)
1986–1991	Fitzroy	7 (4)
1992–1996	Hawthorn	80 (30)
1997	Collingwood	4 (0)
Total		91 (34)
- ^{1} Playing statistics correct to the end of 1997.

Jason Taylor (born 23 September 1968) is a former Australian rules footballer in the Australian Football League.

== Family ==
The third of three generations of VFL/AFL footballers: his grandfather was Cliff "Beau" Taylor, and his father was Noel Taylor.

== Football ==
Taylor played 91 games for Fitzroy, Hawthorn, and Collingwood from 1990 to 1997.

== See also ==
- List of Australian rules football families
