= Landing Zone Liz =

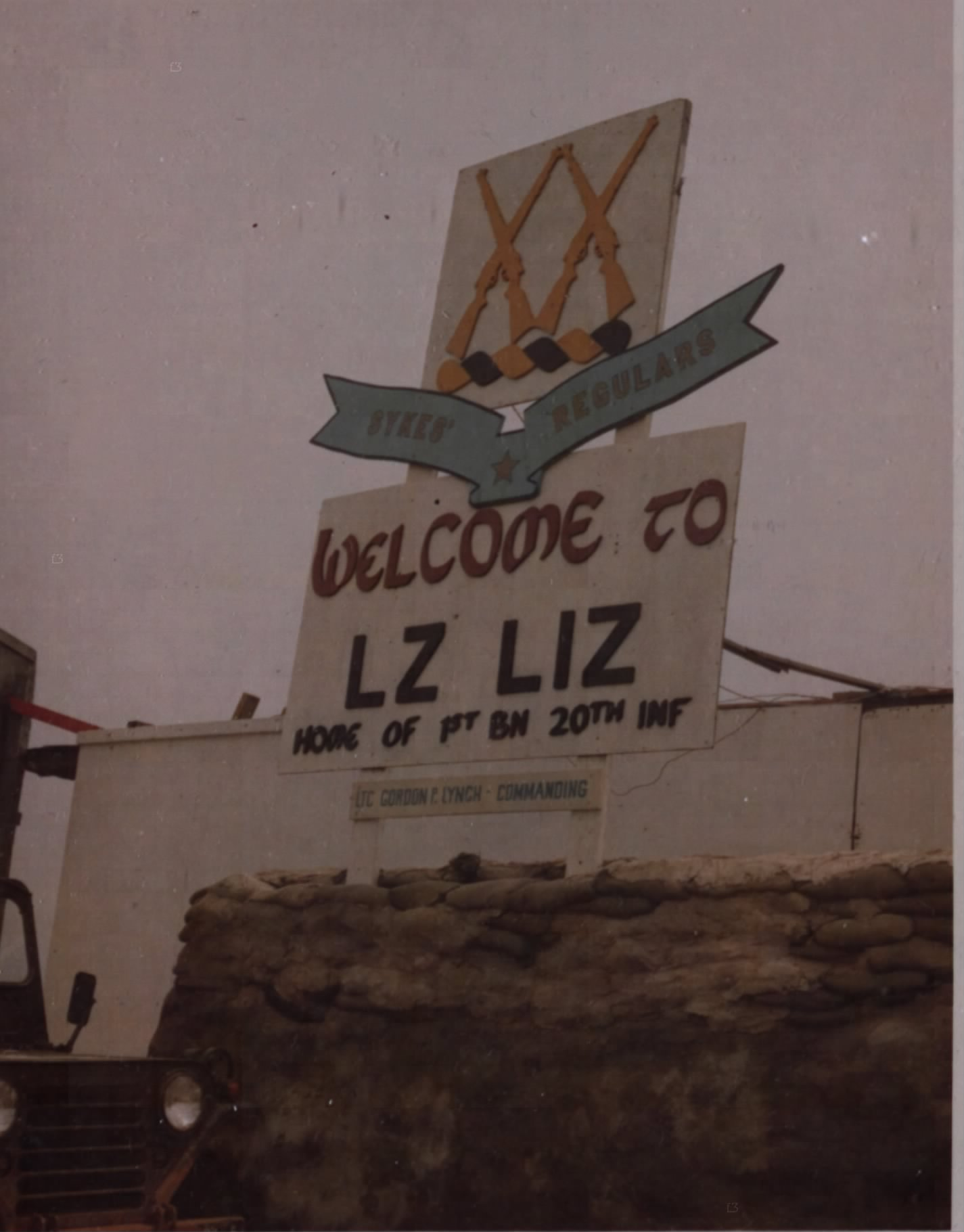
- Sign at Landing Zone Liz, occupied by members of the 1st Battalion, 20th Infantry, October 1970

Site information
- Type: Army
- Condition: abandoned

Location
- Coordinates: 14.855°N 108.907°E

Site history
- Built: 1967
- In use: 1967-71
- Battles/wars: Vietnam War

Garrison information
- Occupants: 3rd Battalion, 1st Infantry Regiment; 1/82 Artillery

Landing Zone (LZ) Liz was a forward support base for the US Marines and later for the US Army during the Vietnam War.

LZ Liz was located in Quang Ngai Province, I Corps, south of Da Nang and Chu Lai, west of Highway 1, north of LZ Bronco and Đức Phổ. It was on the Duc Pho and Mo Duc borders, just south of the 515 Highway, that ran from the South China Sea (Highway 1) west to Ba To. LZ Liz consisted of two small hills with a saddle running in between. The saddle was occupied by the artillery. Liz was connected to Highway 1 by an access road that was about 3/4 of a mile in length.

== History ==
LZ Liz was occupied in late December 1967 by the 3rd Battalion, 1st Infantry Regiment of the 11th Light Infantry Brigade, 23rd (Americal) Infantry Division, primarily Alpha and Bravo companies.

In July 1968 C battery, 1st Battalion, 82nd Field Artillery Regiment was deployed to LZ Liz and the guns were moved from the saddle to the eastern hill facing the South China Sea. The 1/82nd supplied support for the Đức Phổ Base Camp and the field troops of the 1/20th.

Beginning with Tet 1969 the LZ began to be attacked with mortar and rocket attacks periodically. Liz was the last support base for 1st Battalion, 20th Infantry Regiment, 11th Infantry Brigade (Light), 23rd Infantry Division prior to their standing down and moving to Chu Lai in September 1971.
