= James Shanahan =

United States Army general (1920–1997)

Brigadier general James G. Shanahan (1920 Pompey, New York – 8 January 1997 Alexandria, Virginia) served in the United States Army from 1942 through 1973.

James Shanahan joined ROTC at Niagara University and was commissioned in 1942 following his graduation. Shanahan was initially given a command in the 35th Infantry Regiment, 25th Infantry Division. He served as a platoon leader and company commander for this unit in the Pacific theater during the Second World War.

Following the end of the war, he returned to the United States to serve as an aide in the Truman White House. When the Korean War broke out he returned to combat as the battalion commander for the 1-38th, 2nd Infantry Division. He also led the 3rd Brigade of the 25th Infantry Division during the Vietnam War.

He became one of only 138 soldiers to earn the Combat Infantryman Badge with two combat stars (three awards - World War II, Korea, Vietnam). Additional decorations include the Distinguished Service Medal, three Silver Stars, two Bronze Star Medals for Valor, four Bronze Star Medals for Merit, the Joint Service Commendation Medal, Army Commendation Medal with oak leaf cluster, Purple Heart, Air Medal with eight clusters, the Vietnamese National Order of Valor and two Vietnamese Gallantry Crosses.

He was a graduate of the Command and General Staff College, the Armed Forces Staff College, and the National War College.

Following his retirement from the Army in 1973 at the rank of brigadier general, James Shanahan settled in the Alexandria, Virginia, area and became a real estate broker. He died of an apparent heart attack on 8 January 1997 and is buried in Arlington National Cemetery.
