= 1990 AFL finals series =

The 1990 finals series was the first finals series to be played under the newly renamed Australian Football League. The series was scheduled to occur over four weekends in September 1990, culminating with the 94th AFL/VFL Grand Final at the Melbourne Cricket Ground on 29 September 1990. However, after Collingwood and West Coast drew in the qualifying final, the series was extended to five weeks, ending on 6 October. Collingwood would eventually go on to win the 1990 Premiership, breaking a famous 32-year drought marked by numerous Grand Final losses.

== The finals system ==
This was the 18th and final season in which the McIntyre final five system would be used. With the introduction of the Adelaide Crows the following season, the system would expand to become a final six.

== Qualification ==
(P)	Premiers
	Qualified for finals

#	Team	P	W	L	D	PF	PA	%	Pts
1	Essendon	22	17	5	0	2526	1815	139.2	68
2	Collingwood (P)	22	16	6	0	2376	1825	130.2	64
3	West Coast	22	16	6	0	2274	1920	118.4	64
4	Melbourne	22	16	6	0	2339	2066	113.2	64
5	Hawthorn	22	14	8	0	2414	2002	120.6	56
6	North Melbourne	22	12	10	0	2519	2210	114.0	48
7	Footscray	22	12	10	0	2016	2031	99.3	48
8	Carlton	22	11	11	0	2277	2187	104.1	44
9	St Kilda	22	9	13	0	2328	2313	100.6	36
10	Geelong	22	8	14	0	2248	2398	93.7	32
11	Richmond	22	7	15	0	1988	2530	78.6	28
12	Fitzroy	22	7	15	0	1874	2389	78.4	28
13	Sydney	22	5	17	0	1904	2704	70.4	20
14	Brisbane Bears	22	4	18	0	1733	2426	71.4	16

Rules for classification: 1. premiership points; 2. percentage; 3. points for
Average score: 100.1
Source: AFL Tables

Essendon won the minor premiership with 17 wins, followed by Collingwood, West Coast and Melbourne on 16 wins each. Reigning premiers Hawthorn rounded out the Top Five with 14 wins.

== Finals ==
The opening qualifying final between Collingwood and West Coast ended in a draw, resulting in the game being replayed the following week and all remaining finals being pushed back by a week. The AFL changed the rules for the following year to instead play extra time in the event of a draw in a minor final. The Grand Final replay rule remained in place until 2016.

=== Qualifying Finals (Collingwood v West Coast) ===
Qualifying Final
Sep 08, 1990	Collingwood	drew with	West Coast	Waverley Park (crowd: 54,816)	Match report
3.6 (24); 7.11 (53); 10.12 (72); 13.12 (90)	Q1; Q2; Q3; Final	3.1 (19); 6.5 (41); 10.10 (70); 13.12 (90)

=== Qualifying Final Replay (Collingwood v West Coast) ===
Qualifying Final
Sep. 15 1990	Collingwood	def.	West Coast	Waverley Park (crowd: 53,520)
8.1 (49); 12.6 (78); 14.9 (93); 19.12 (126)	Q1; Q2; Q3; Final	2.1 (13); 4.5 (29); 9.9 (63); 9.13 (67)
Brown (4), Daicos (4), Crosisca (2), Francis (2), Manson (2), McGuane, Christian, Kelly, Millane, Russell	Goals	Sumich (4), Keene (2), Kemp, Langdon, Turley

=== Elimination final (Melbourne v Hawthorn) ===
Elimination Final
Sep. 09, 1990	Melbourne	def.	Hawthorn	MCG (crowd: 74,954)
1.2 (8); 3.6 (24); 9.10 (64); 10.13 (73)	Q1; Q2; Q3; Final	2.6 (18); 4.7 (31); 5.10 (40); 8.16 (64)	Umpires: Rowan Sawers, Peter Carey
Bennett (4), Stretch (2), Fishold, Healy, Jackson, Spalding	Goals	Brereton (2), Dunstall (2), Hall (2), Platten, Pritchard

=== First Semi-Final (West Coast v Melbourne) ===
1st semi-Final
Sep. 22, 1990	West Coast	def.	Melbourne	Waverley Park (crowd: 43,458)
4.2 (26); 10.5 (65); 16.10 (106); 19.16 (130)	Q1; Q2; Q3; Final	2.1 (13); 2.8 (20); 8.9 (57); 15.10 (100)	Umpires: Rowan Sawers, Denis Rich
Chris Waterman 6, Peter Sumich 4, Stevan Jackson 3, Chris Mainwaring 2, Laurie Keene, Dean Kemp, Karl Langdon, Chris Lewis 1	Goals	Rod Grinter 4 Darren Bennett, Ricky Jackson, Graeme Yeats 2, Tony Campbell, Simon Eishold, Greg Healy, Earl Spalding, Stephen Tingay 1

=== Second Semi-Final (Collingwood v Essendon) ===
2nd semi-Final
September 23, 1990	Collingwood	def.	Essendon	Melbourne Cricket Ground (crowd: 91,555)
4.5 (29); 7.7 (49); 12.8 (80); 17.15 (117)	Q1; Q2; Q3; Final	2.3 (15); 5.7 (37); 7.10 (52); 7.12 (54)	Umpires: Peter Carey, Bryan Sheehan
Gavin Brown 5 Doug Barwick, Peter Daicos 3 Scott Russell, Craig Starcevich 2 Gavin Crosisca, Tony Francis 1	Goals	Paul Salmon 3 Mark Harvey, Derek Kickett, Mark Thompson, Paul Vander Haar 1

=== Preliminary final (Essendon v West Coast) ===
Preliminary final
29 September, 2:30pm	Essendon	def.	West Coast	Waverley Park (crowd: 55,813)
4.1 (25); 11.3 (69); 13.10 (88); 18.13 (121)	Q1; Q2; Q3; Final	1.2 (8); 5.3 (33); 6.8 (44); 8.10 (58)	Umpires: Carey, Sheehan; Television broadcast: Seven Network
Harvey, Ezard 3 Vander Haar, Salmon, Madden 2 Long, Bewick, Kickett, Anderson, Watson, Manning 1	Goals	Jackson 3 Sumich 2 Mainwaring, Langdon, Heady 1
Madden, T. Daniher, Anderson, Grenvold, Ezard, Hamilton, Bewick	Best	Mainwaring, Lewis, Scott, Hart, Heady, Brennan, McKenna

=== Grand Final (Collingwood v Essendon) ===
1990 AFL Grand Final
Saturday, 6 October 2:30pm	Collingwood	def.	Essendon	MCG (crowd: 98,944)	Match report
2.5 (17); 8.9 (57); 11.10 (76); 13.11 (89)	Q1; Q2; Q3; Final	2.2 (14); 3.5 (23); 5.6 (36); 5.11 (41)	Umpires: Sawers, Rich; Norm Smith Medal: Tony Shaw; Television broadcast: Seven Network; National anthem: Normie Rowe
Brown 2, Barwick 2, Crosisca 2, Russell 2, Daicos 2, Monkhorst, Starcevich, McGuane	Goals	Salmon 2, Kickett, Somerville, Grenvold
Shaw, Russell, Monkhorst, Millane, Francis, Kerrison, Starcevich, Crosisca, McGuane	Best	Watson, Sporn, T. Daniher, Kickett, Ezard, O'Donnell
Brown (concussion), Starcevich (concussion)	Injuries	Nil
See Tribunal	Reports	See Tribunal
Match was also broadcast on 3AW and 3LO radio

== See also ==
- 1990 AFL season
