= 1993 State of Origin Championships =

1993 Australian rules football tournament

Tournament information
- Sport: Australian rules football
- Dates: 1 June 1993–6 June 1993
- Format: Knockout
- Teams: 6

Final champion
- SECTION 1: South Australia; SECTION 2: Queensland-Northern Territory

The 1993 State of Origin Championships, known formally as the CUB AFL State of Origin championship, was the last Australian rules football series held involving representative teams of all Australian states. It was the first and only such tournament run by the AFL Commission. It was the first tournament to combine territory teams with state teams.

Victoria, Tasmania, South Australia and Western Australia played as their own states, while New South Wales combined with Australian Capital Territory and Queensland combined with Northern Territory. The two composite teams gave Queensland and New South Wales the first opportunity to select their teams under State of Origin criteria since the 1988 Bicentennial Carnival, but also meant the end of standalone participation by the two territories. Aided significantly by the small Northern Territory contingent, it was the first successful tournament featuring a side under the banner of Queensland, which defeated Tasmania to win Section Two.

South Australia defeated Victoria in the section 1 final by 12 points in front of a crowd of 31,792 at the Melbourne Cricket Ground.
Queensland–Northern Territory defeated Tasmania in the section 2 final by 34 points in front of a crowd of 9,660, at Bellerive Oval.

== Format and Rules ==
All 4 matches of the State of Origin Championships were played under the same rules as that of the 1993 pre season premiership, the Foster's Cup, with all 4 quarters running for 20 minutes, and time-on added on for scores and for the treating of injured players, and extra time if the scores were level at full time.

== 1993 AFL State of Origin matches ==
Home team	Score	Away team	Score	Ground	City/Town	Crowd	Date	Time
Victoria	19.16 (130)	New South Wales/ACT	8.17 (65)	MCG	Melbourne	22,409	1 June 1993	7:00 PM
Home team	Score	Away team	Score	Ground	City/Town	Crowd	Date	Time
South Australia	19.13 (127)	Western Australia	14.7 (91)	Football Park	Adelaide	21,487	2 June 1993	8:00 PM
Home team	Score	Away team	Score	Ground	City/Town	Crowd	Date	Time
Victoria	14.13 (97)	South Australia	16.13 (109)	MCG	Melbourne	31,792	5 June 1993	4:40 PM
Home team	Score	Away team	Score	Ground	City/Town	Crowd	Date	Time
Tasmania	10.16 (76)	Queensland/ Northern Territory	16.14 (110)	Bellerive Oval	Hobart	9,660	6 June 1993	12:00 PM

== 1993 AFL State of Origin Section Winners ==
- Section 1 – South Australia
- Section 2 – Queensland–Northern Territory

== 1993 AFL State of Origin Medal Winners ==
- Section 1 – Semi Final 1: E. J. Whitten Medal: Chris Langford (Victoria)
- Section 1 – Semi Final 2: Fos Williams Medal: Greg Anderson (South Australia)
- Section 1 – Grand Final: Fos Williams Medal: Craig Bradley (South Australia)
- Section 1 – Grand Final: E. J. Whitten Medal: Robert Harvey (Victoria)
- Section 2 – Grand Final:

== 1993 AFL State of Origin Squads ==
South Australia

Coach: Graham Cornes
Captain/s: Chris McDermott
Vice Captain/s: Tony McGuinness
Deputy Vice Captain/s:
vs Western Australia & Victoria

- 2 – Andrew Jarman (Adelaide)
- 3 – Mark Bickley (Adelaide)
- 5 – Andrew McKay (Carlton)
- 6 – Tony Modra (Adelaide)
- 7 – Nigel Smart (Adelaide)
- 8 – Tony Francis (Collingwood)
- 9 – Matthew Robran (Adelaide)
- 10 – Chris McDermott (Adelaide)
- 11 – Tony McGuinness (Adelaide)
- 14 – Gavin Wanganeen (Essendon)
- 15 – Darren Jarman (Adelaide)
- 16 – Tony Hall (Hawthorn)
- 17 – Martin Leslie (Brisbane)
- 19 – David Grenvold (Essendon)
- 20 – David Pittman (Adelaide)
- 21 – Craig Bradley (Carlton)
- 22 – David Hynes (West Coast)
- 29 – Scott Russell (Collingwood)
- 34 – Ben Hart (Adelaide)

vs Western Australia

- 24 – Andrew Obst (Melbourne)
- 26 – Greg Anderson (Adelaide)
- 44 – John Platten (Hawthorn)

vs Victoria

- 4 – Stephen Kernahan (Carlton)
- 28 – Paul Bulluss (Richmond)

Other squad members

- 1 – Scott Hodges (Adelaide)
- 12 – Simon Tregenza (Adelaide)
- 18 – Rodney Maynard (Adelaide)
- 25 – Mark Naley (South Adelaide)
- 52 – Shaun Rehn (Adelaide)
Victoria

Coach: Bill Goggin
Captain/s: Paul Roos
Vice Captain/s: Gavin Brown
Deputy Vice Captain/s:
vs NSW-ACT & South Australia

- 1 – Paul Roos (Fitzroy)
- 2 – Gavin Brown (Collingwood)
- 3 – Nathan Burke (St Kilda)
- 8 – Robert Scott (Geelong)
- 9 – Anthony Rock (North Melbourne)
- 10 – Gary O'Donnell (Essendon)
- 11 – Glenn Lovett (Melbourne)
- 13 – Mil Hanna (Carlton)
- 14 – Gary Ablett (Geelong)
- 17 – Craig Sholl (North Melbourne)
- 18 – Ross Smith (North Melbourne)
- 20 – Matthew Knights (Hawthorn)
- 21 – Jim Stynes (Melbourne)
- 22 – Danny Frawley (St Kilda)
- 23 – Stewart Loewe (St Kilda)
- 24 – Chris Langford (Hawthorn)
- 28 – Paul Salmon (Essendon)

vs NSW-ACT

- 4 – Craig Lambert (Richmond)
- 7 – Wayne Schwass (North Melbourne)
- 12 – Shane Watson (Collingwood)
- 16 – Chris Grant (Footscray)
- 19 – Stephen Silvagni (Carlton)

vs South Australia

- 5 – Greg Williams (Carlton)
- 12 – Mick McGuane (Collingwood)
- 15 – Mark Harvey (Essendon)
- 16 – Robert Harvey (St Kilda)
- 25 – Garry Lyon (Melbourne)

Other Squad Members

- 5 – Mark Thompson (Essendon)
- 6 – Andrew Bews (Brisbane)
- 25 – Tony Lockett (St Kilda)
- 26 – Scott Wynd (Footscray)
- 27 – Damian Monkhorst (Collingwood)
Western Australia

Coach: Mick Malthouse
Captain/s: John Worsfold
Vice Captain/s:
Deputy Vice Captain/s:
vs South Australia

- 1 – Brett Heady (West Coast)
- 2 – Dean Laidley (North Melbourne)
- 3 – Mark Bairstow (Geelong)
- 4 – Peter Sumich (West Coast)
- 5 – John Gastev (Brisbane)
- 6 – Brad Rowe (Collingwood)
- 7 – Nicky Winmar (St Kilda)
- 8 – Darren Bewick (Essendon)
- 9 – Peter Wilson (West Coast)
- 11 – Marcus Seecamp (Fitzroy)
- 13 – Scott Watters (Sydney)
- 14 – Derek Kickett (Essendon)
- 15 – Ben Allan (Hawthorn)
- 16 – Mark Zanotti (Fitzroy)
- 17 – Peter Matera (West Coast)
- 19 – Chris Lewis (West Coast)
- 20 – Allen Jakovich (Melbourne)
- 21 – Michael Christian (Collingwood)
- 24 – John Worsfold (West Coast)
- 26 – Alex Ishchenko (North Melbourne)
- 27 – Glen Jakovich (West Coast)
- 28 – Craig Starcevich (Brisbane)

Other Squad Members

- 10 – Michael Dunstan (Fitzroy)
- 22 – Earl Spalding (Carlton)
- 23 – Guy McKenna (West Coast)
- 25 – Jon Dorotich (Carlton)
- 29 – Stephen O'Reilly (Geelong)
- 30 – Dean Irving (West Coast)

NSW-ACT

Coach: Terry Daniher
Captain/s: Wayne Carey
Vice Captain/s: Paul Kelly
Deputy Vice Captain/s:
vs Victoria

- 2 – Shane Crawford (Hawthorn)
- 3 – Michael Gayfer (Collingwood)
- 4 – Brett Allison (North Melbourne)
- 5 – James Hird (Essendon)
- 6 – David Murphy (Sydney)
- 7 – Chris Daniher (Essendon)
- 8 – Adrian Barich (West Perth)
- 10 – Don Pyke (West Coast)
- 11 – Tim Powell (Carlton)
- 12 – Russell Morris (Hawthorn)
- 13 – Neil Brunton (Sydney)
- 14 – Paul Kelly (Sydney)
- 15 – Bernard Toohey (Footscray)
- 16 – Billy Brownless (Geelong)
- 18 – Wayne Carey (North Melbourne)
- 19 – Robbie Neill (Sydney)
- 21 – Anthony Daniher (Essendon)
- 22 – Mark Roberts (North Melbourne)
- 23 – Glenn Coleman (Footscray)
- 24 – John Longmire (North Melbourne)
- 27 – Sanford Wheeler (Sydney)
- Jamie Lawson (Sydney)

Other Squad Members

- 1 – Darren Holmes (Sydney)
- 9 – Paul Spargo (Brisbane)
- 17 – Michael Werner (Sydney)
- 20 – Greg Stafford (Sydney)
- 25 – Jason Mooney (Sydney)
- 26 – Peter McIntyre (Adelaide)
- 28 – Craig Nettelbeck (Sydney)
Queensland–Northern Territory

Coach: Norm Dare
Captain/s: Jason Dunstall
Vice Captain/s: Michael McLean, Gavin Crosisca
Deputy Vice Captain/s:
vs Tasmania

- 1 – Steven McLuckie (Brisbane)
- 2 – Che Cockatoo-Collins (Port Adelaide)
- 3 – Fabian Francis (Brisbane)
- 4 – Troy Clarke (Brisbane)
- 5 – Darren Carlson (West Adelaide)
- 6 – David Wearne (Morningside)
- 7 – Tony Lynn (Central District)
- 8 – Michael Long (Essendon)
- 10 – Marcus Ashcroft (Brisbane)
- 11 – Nathan Buckley (Brisbane)
- 12 – Steve Lawrence (Brisbane)
- 13 – Michael Voss (Brisbane)
- 14 – Ray Windsor (Brisbane)
- 15 – Danny Dickfos (North Brisbane)
- 16 – Craig Potter (Central District)
- 17 – Michael McLean (Brisbane)
- 18 – Simon Luhrs (Central District)
- 19 – Jason Dunstall (Hawthorn)
- 21 – Rudi Frigo (Brisbane)
- 22 – Darryl White (Brisbane)
- 23 – Gilbert McAdam (St Kilda)
- 24 – Matthew Kennedy (Brisbane)

Other Squad Members

- 9 – Warren Campbell (South Fremantle)
- 20 – Adrian McAdam (North Melbourne)
- 25 – Gavin Crosisca (Collingwood)
Tasmania

Coach: Robert Shaw
Captain/s: Darrin Pritchard
Vice Captain/s: Stephen MacPherson
Deputy Vice Captain/s: Alastair Lynch
vs Queensland–Northern Territory

- 1 – Darrin Pritchard (Hawthorn)
- 3 – Adrian Fletcher (Brisbane)
- 4 – Chris Bond (Richmond)
- 5 – Trent Nichols (East Fremantle)
- 7 – Bradley Plain (Essendon)
- 8 – Stephen MacPherson (Footscray)
- 10 – Paul Williams (Collingwood)
- 11 – Alastair Lynch (Fitzroy)
- 12 – Andy Lovell (Melbourne)
- 15 – Michael Gale (Fitzroy)
- 16 – Matthew Mansfield (Footscray)
- 17 – Paul Hudson (Hawthorn)
- 18 – Matthew Richardson (Richmond)
- 19 – Ben Buckley (North Melbourne)
- 20 – Matthew Febey (Melbourne)
- 21 – Steven Febey (Melbourne)
- 23 – Simon Atkins (Footscray)
- 24 – Dion Scott (Brisbane)
- 25 – John McCarthy (Fitzroy)
- 26 – Brendon Gale (Richmond)
- 29 – Jamie Shanahan (St Kilda)
- 30 – James Manson (Fitzroy)

Other Squad Members

- 2 – Graham Wright (Collingwood)
- 6 – Doug Barwick (Collingwood)
- 9 – Errol Bourne (Subiaco)
- 13 – Nigel Palfreyman (Brisbane)
- 14 – Matthew Armstrong (Fitzroy)
- 28 – Stephen Rattray (North Hobart)
