= 1990 AFL Grand Final =

Grand final of the 1990 Australian Football League season

Collingwood	Essendon
13.11 (89)	5.11 (41)
	1	2	3	4
COL	2.5 (17)	8.9 (57)	11.10 (76)	13.11 (89)
ESS	2.2 (14)	3.5 (23)	5.6 (36)	5.11 (41)
- Date: 6 October 1990, 2.30pm
- Stadium: Melbourne Cricket Ground
- Attendance: 98,944
- Umpires: Sawers, Rowan

Ceremonies
- Pre-match entertainment: Normie Rowe
- National anthem: Normie Rowe

Accolades
- Norm Smith Medallist: Tony Shaw (Collingwood)
- Jock McHale Medallist: Leigh Matthews

Broadcast in Australia
- Network: Seven Network
- Commentators: Bruce McAvaney (host); Sandy Roberts (commentator); Ian Robertson (commentator); Don Scott (expert commentator); Bernie Quinlan (boundary rider); Michael Roberts (boundary rider); Peter McKenna (analyst); Ross Glendinning (analyst)

The 1990 AFL Grand Final was an Australian rules football game contested between the Collingwood Football Club and the Essendon Football Club, held at the Melbourne Cricket Ground in Melbourne on 6 October 1990. It was the 94th annual grand final of the Australian Football League (formerly the Victorian Football League), staged to determine the premiers for the 1990 AFL season. The match, attended by 98,944 spectators, was won by Collingwood by a margin of 48 points, marking that club's 14th premiership victory.

== Background ==
During the first half of the 20th century Collingwood was very successful, winning the majority of its premierships during this time. However, since winning the 1958 VFL grand final, Collingwood had made nine unsuccessful grand final attempts in 32 years (including a draw in the 1977 VFL grand final against North Melbourne), a streak which had become known as the Colliwobbles. Essendon had last played a grand final in 1985, which it had won against Hawthorn; that match was the last game of now-Collingwood coach and then-Hawthorn forward Leigh Matthews' playing career.

At the conclusion of the home-and-away season, Essendon had finished first on the AFL ladder with 17 wins and 5 losses. Collingwood had finished second with 16 wins and 6 losses. The top five qualified for the finals, which were played under the McIntyre final five system.

The grand final was delayed one week from its original scheduled date and held on 1 October, since Collingwood and West Coast played a draw in the qualifying final at Waverley Park in the first week of the finals. The match was replayed the following week, with Collingwood winning convincingly by 59 points to advance to the second semi-final against Essendon. In the second semi-final, Collingwood scored ten goals to two after half time to win by 63 points and advance to the grand final. Essendon faced West Coast in the preliminary final, winning by 63 points, to earn its place in the grand final.

Collingwood's drawn qualifying final with West Coast caused the grand final and all other finals to be delayed by a week from the originally scheduled dates, which proved both controversial and commercially challenging. It was controversial because, when Essendon played the second semi-final, it had been 21 days since its last competitive match (having received the minor premier's bye, followed by a bye for the replayed final); although the club played an unofficial practice match against 12th-placed Fitzroy during the second week, the extra week off was thought to have affected Essendon's form and contributed to its losses in the second semi-final and, ultimately, the grand final. It also caused an unprecedented commercial and logistical challenge, as a large number of league and corporate events related to grand final week had to be rescheduled, impacting travel, venues and hotels; drawn finals had occurred before, but the number and scale of corporate grand final week events had increased significantly since the last time a drawn finals match had forced the grand final to be rescheduled in 1972. As a result, starting from 1991, the rules were changed to allow extra time to be played in drawn finals (excluding the grand final) to ensure the grand final date would not change.

== Match summary ==
=== First quarter ===
The match began with Essendon starting strongly, as the Bombers' beanpole full-forward Paul Salmon kicked two early goals from strong marks. The signs looked ominous for Collingwood who were unable to penetrate before a classic goal by Peter Daicos from the boundary followed by a late goal by Gavin Brown from an Essendon turnover gave the inaccurate Magpies a three-point lead, and considerable momentum, at the first change.

==== Quarter-time brawl ====
At the sounding of the quarter time siren, a wild brawl erupted in the Essendon forward pocket drawing all players on the ground and spreading to include team officials. During the brawl, Gavin Brown was flattened by Terry Daniher in retaliation for Brown felling Kieran Sporn. The umpires, police, stadium security and Channel Seven boundary rider Bernie Quinlan were needed to restore order. In the aftermath ten players and officials were reported (see below for details). The violent brawl, beamed live across Australia and the world, shocked viewers, fans and officials alike, and would be the catalyst for the AFL to crack down on violence in the game, leading to greater penalties and severe fines for players engaging in brawls.

=== Second quarter ===
Following the brawl, the umpires took a hard line on any indiscretions. Collingwood, playing in front at the contests, benefitted from this, and won several free kicks and fifty metre penalties, from which they scored five goals in the first nine minutes of the quarter. Essendon never really recovered from this purple patch, and after finishing with six goals to one in the second quarter, Collingwood led by 34 points at half time.

=== Third quarter ===
Collingwood continued strongly after half time, whilst Kevin Sheedy had shuffled his Essendon players into different positions all across the ground in an attempt to bridge the deficit, attempting to replicate his successful three-quarter-time efforts in the 1984 VFL Grand Final. Craig Starcevich was knocked out by Terry Daniher after taking a mark, with Mick McGuane taking his kick and scoring from the resultant 50 metre penalty. Peter Daicos scored a spectacular goal from near the behind post to extend Collingwood's margin to 46 points. Essendon scored the next two goals midway through the third quarter with two quick goals, before Gavin Brown goaled late to give Collingwood a 40-point lead at three-quarter time.

=== Fourth quarter ===
Essendon attacked and dominated the play early in the last quarter but could only manage behinds, including hitting the post twice from set shots. After absorbing the Essendon pressure for twenty minutes, Collingwood's Doug Barwick scored the first goal of the quarter, with a snapshot from 25 metres. The siren sounded soon after Damian Monkhorst scored to make the margin 48 points. Essendon was held goalless in the final quarter.

=== Norm Smith medal ===
The Norm Smith Medal was awarded to Collingwood's Tony Shaw for being judged the best player afield, with 32 possessions in an inspirational display. He was the first team captain to be awarded the medal.

=== Tribunal ===
Ten players and officials were reported on a total of seventeen offences as a result of the quarter-time brawl. The reports and tribunal outcomes were:

- Terry Daniher (Essendon): Charged with striking Gavin Brown and striking Craig Starcevich. Suspended for 12 matches.
- Graeme Allan (Colllingwood football manager): Charged with striking Essendon runner Peter Power and conduct unbecoming of a team official. Suspended for six matches and fined $15,000.
- Eddie Hillgrove (Colllingwood team manager): Charged with assaulting Essendon bootstudder Graham Menola and conduct unbecoming of a team official. Suspended for six matches and fined $7,500.
- Darren Bewick (Essendon): Charged with striking and rough conduct against Tony Shaw, kneeing Denis Banks, and striking Doug Barwick. Cleared of first three charges; suspended for four matches.
- Gavin Brown (Colllingwood): Charged with striking Kieran Sporn. Suspended for three matches.
- Kieran Sporn (Essendon): Charged with striking Denis Banks. Suspended for two matches.
- John Synan (Essendon doorman): Charged with charging Colllingwood team manager Eddie Hillgrove and conduct unbecoming of a team official. Fined $5,000.
- Craig Kelly (Colllingwood) and Paul Van Der Haar (Essendon): Charged with striking each other. Both found not guilty.
- Derek Kickett (Essendon): Charged with striking Mick McGuane. Found not guilty.

=== Aftermath ===
The win was the first for Leigh Matthews as coach. He had previously captained Hawthorn to grand finals in the 1980s, and later went on to coach the Brisbane Lions to three premierships in the 2000s.

Many of Essendon's senior players retired or moved on in the following two seasons; however, their next grand final appearance came only three years later, when the Baby Bombers (so named because of the high number of players they had under 21) and won the 1993 AFL Grand Final against Carlton. Collingwood did not win another premiership for 20 years, until they defeated St Kilda in the 2010 replay.

In a tragic postscript, Collingwood player Darren Millane, who was in possession of the ball when the final siren sounded, died in a car accident one year and one day after the match.

== Entertainment ==
Pre-match entertainment was provided by Normie Rowe, the Victorian Children's Choir and the Combined Services Band singing Waltzing Matilda and Advance Australia Fair. US PGA champion golfer Wayne Grady made a lap of honour of the ground.

After the match, the premiership cup was presented by Jack Hamilton Jr., son of long-time VFL administrator Jack Hamilton who had died during the season. The Norm Smith Medal was presented by six-time Melbourne premiership player Bluey Adams

== Teams ==
Collingwood	Essendon

Collingwood
B:	44 Shane Kerrison	21 Michael Christian	12 Denis Banks
HB:	7 Shane Morwood	23 Craig Kelly	3 Michael Gayfer
C:	42 Darren Millane	22 Tony Shaw (c)	19 Graham Wright
HF:	29 Scott Russell	35 Peter Daicos	17 Doug Barwick
F:	26 Gavin Brown	1 Damian Monkhorst	28 Gavin Crosisca
Foll:	30 James Manson	34 Michael McGuane	2 Tony Francis
Int:	24 Jamie Turner	27 Craig Starcevich	
Coach:	Leigh Matthews		

Essendon
B:	16 Paul Hamilton	6 Anthony Daniher	5 Terry Daniher
HB:	7 Chris Daniher	10 Gary O'Donnell	29 David Grenvold
C:	11 Greg Anderson	9 Derek Kickett	23 Peter Cransberg
HF:	32 Tim Watson (c)	18 Paul Van Der Haar	4 Michael Long
F:	15 Alan Ezard	3 Paul Salmon	8 Darren Bewick
Foll:	27 Simon Madden	1 Mark Harvey	26 Mark Thompson
Int:	17 Kieran Sporn	19 Peter Somerville	
Coach:	Kevin Sheedy		

== Scorecard ==
1990 AFL Grand Final
Saturday, 6 October 2:30pm	Collingwood	def.	Essendon	MCG (crowd: 98,944)
2.5 (17); 8.9 (57); 11.10 (76); 13.11 (89)	Q1; Q2; Q3; Final	2.2 (14); 3.5 (23); 5.6 (36); 5.11 (41)	Umpires: Sawers, Rich; Norm Smith Medal: Tony Shaw; Television broadcast: Seven Network; National anthem: Normie Rowe
Brown, Barwick, Crosisca, Russell, Daicos 2 Monkhorst, Starcevich, McGuane 1	Goals	2 Salmon; 1 Kickett, Somerville, Grenvold
Shaw, Russell, Monkhorst, Millane, Francis, Kerrison, Starcevich, Crosisca, McGuane	Best	Watson, Sporn, T. Daniher, Kickett, Ezard, O'Donnell
Brown (concussion), Starcevich (concussion)	Injuries	Nil
See Tribunal	Reports	See Tribunal
Match was also broadcast on 3AW and 3LO radio

=== Statistics ===
Collingwood Magpies	89–41	Essendon Bombers
(13.11)		(5.11)

Position	Player	Pos'ns	Goals
Back	Shane Kerrison	17	
Back	Michael Christian	19	
Back	Michael Gayfer	9	
Half-back	Shane Morwood	18	
Half-back	Craig Kelly	16	
Half-back	Gavin Crosisca	5	2
Centre	Darren Millane	26	
Centre	Tony Shaw	24	
Centre	Graham Wright	15	
Half-forward	Dennis Banks	11	
Half-forward	James Manson	5	
Half-forward	Doug Barwick	13	2
Forward	Scott Russell	26	2
Forward	Gavin Brown	7	2
Forward	Peter Daicos	7	2
Ruck	Damian Monkhorst	17	1
Ruck-rover	Mick McGuane	23	1
Rover	Tony Francis	25	
Interchange:
Interchange	Jamie Turner	12	
Interchange	Craig Starcevich	14	1
Coach:
Leigh Matthews

Position	Player	Pos'ns	Goals
Back	Mark Thompson	15	
Back	Anthony Daniher	18	
Back	Paul Hamilton	8	
Half-back	David Grenvold	16	1
Half-back	Terry Daniher	12	
Half-back	Gary O'Donnell	16	
Centre	Greg Anderson	4	
Centre	Derek Kickett	17	1
Centre	Michael Long	10	
Half-forward	Mark Harvey	10	
Half-forward	Paul Van Der Haar	6	
Half-forward	Peter Cransberg	7	
Forward	Alan Ezard	19	
Forward	Paul Salmon	10	2
Forward	Kieran Sporn	18	
Ruck	Simon Madden	7	
Ruck-rover	Tim Watson (c)	24	
Rover	Darren Bewick	12	
Interchange:
Interchange	Chris Daniher	12	
Interchange	Peter Somerville	3	1
Coach:
Kevin Sheedy

== See also ==
- 1990 AFL season
