= Mick McGuane =

Australian rules footballer (born 1967)

Michael McGuane
- McGuane coaching Keilor in 2026

Personal information
- Full name: Michael McGuane
- Born: 29 December 1967 (age 58)
- Original team: Sebastopol (BFL)
- Height: 186 cm (6 ft 1 in)
- Weight: 95 kg (209 lb)

Playing career^{1}
Years	Club	Games (Goals)
1987–1996	Collingwood	152 (128)
1997	Carlton	3 (1)
Total		155 (129)
- ^{1} Playing statistics correct to the end of 1997.

Career highlights
- Collingwood premiership 1990; Copeland Trophy 1992, 1993; All-Australian 1992; Goal of the Year 1994; Represented Victoria 4 times

Michael McGuane (born 29 December 1967) is an Australian rules football coach and former player who currently serves as the senior coach of Keilor in the Essendon District Football League (EDFL) Men's Premier Division competition. He previously played for Collingwood and Carlton in the Australian Football League (AFL) during the 1980s and 1990s.

== Playing career ==
=== Early years (1987–1990) ===
McGuane showed great promise for his local club Sebastopol in the Ballarat Football League. He made his senior debut for the club in 1985 while still a teenager and was a member of the side that lost heavily in the Grand Final to North Ballarat. Ignored by St Kilda, who had the Ballarat region in their recruiting zone, Collingwood were quick to pounce, and signed McGuane to their Under 19s squad for the 1986. McGuane made his senior debut 1987 with Collingwood and showed great skills as a running midfielder. In 1988 he finished second to Peter Daicos in the Copeland Trophy count. In 1990 he was one of five Magpies - others being captain Tony Shaw, Scott Russell, Graham Wright and Darren Millane - to accumulate over 500 disposals over the season. He was one of Collingwood's best players in their drought-breaking Grand Final victory over Essendon, acquiring 22 disposals and kicking a goal.

=== Copeland Trophy era (1991–1994) ===
McGuane won consecutive Copeland Trophies in 1992 and 1993, and also won All-Australian selection in 1992. His career was at its peak and he was regarded among the elite in AFL Football, and part of his hard work was due to Darren Millane's trainer, who was asked by Mick to help his fitness. In 1994 he kicked an amazing running goal against Carlton at the MCG, which saw him run from the centre-square along the wing and half-forward flank, closing to 30m and kicking it through the middle. He bounced the ball 7 times during the famous run, and was deemed as one of the greatest goals of all-time.

=== Later career and injuries (1995–1997) ===
McGuane's final years as a player were blighted by injury and exacerbated by ongoing alcohol and gambling problems; in 1991 he had lost his driving licence for 19 months after he was caught drink-driving. Calf injuries were his main concern in 1995, where he played only 13 games. In 1996 he had a life-threatening bladder infection, and resulted in a ruptured urethra. The injury came upon a kick to the groin in the annual ANZAC Day clash against Essendon. At the end of all seasons from 1992–1997, McGuane experienced some kind of surgery.

In 1996 he left Collingwood for a fresh start, and was traded to Carlton for a 1st and 4th round draft selections in the 1996 AFL draft. Coach Tony Shaw of Collingwood did offer McGuane a two-year contract deal, but was refused. He had calf problems at Carlton, causing him only to manage a disappointing 3 games with the rival club. His off-field incidents were also frequent, and included another alcohol problem, as well as a fight with Carlton teammate Matthew Hogg at training. McGuane then returned to Collingwood and worked in the club's marketing department.

== Coaching career ==
In 2000, McGuane took up his first coaching appointment with Tasmanian club Burnie. In 2001, he led them through an undefeated season, culminating in a premiership. McGuane then returned to Victoria to coach Gisborne in the Bendigo Football League for the 2002, 2003 and 2004 seasons. In 2002 all three teams he coached (Under 18s, Reserves and Seniors) won their Grand Final. The seniors won again in 2003.

In 2005, McGuane was appointed a part-time scout at Richmond by coach Terry Wallace, but jumped to St Kilda the following year after securing a full-time coaching appointment under Grant Thomas. After Thomas was sacked at the end of the season, McGuane decided to quit.

McGuane then coached the Balwyn Tigers seniors team in the Eastern Football League Division 1 in 2007. He came to the club at a tough time as they move into the highly rated EFL competition 1st Division. McGuane's coaching saw Balwyn into the finals in their first year in the competition.

In 2008, McGuane was appointed as senior coach of the Keilor Football Club. In his inaugural season, he led the club's Essendon District Football League A Grade side to a grand final victory, followed by premierships in 2016 and 2019. Keilor also claimed back to back premierships in 2023 and 2024 with the latter featuring McGuane’s son Tom who was eligible for the 2025 draft as a Father Son for Collingwood, but was ultimately not drafted at all.
