= Tony Francis =

Tony Francis may refer to:

- Tony Francis (Australian rules footballer) (born 1969)
- Tony Francis (rugby league) (born 2002), Lebanon international rugby league footballer
- Tony Francis (impressionist), impressionist on the British radio series It's That Man Again
- Anthony Francis (1553–1583), Jesuit priest killed in the Cuncolim Revolt
