= McGuane =

McGuane is an Irish surname. Notable people with the surname include:

- Luke McGuane (born 1987), Australian rules footballer
- Marcus McGuane (born 1999), English footballer
- Mick McGuane (born 1967), Australian rules footballer
- Thomas McGuane (born 1939), American writer
