= Jim Manson (Australian footballer) =

Australian rules footballer (1937–2010)

James Henry Manson (2 November 1937 – 20 May 2010) was an Australian rules football player and local government politician from Tasmania, Australia.

Manson played 210 games for Tasmanian Australian National Football League (TANFL) club Glenorchy as a ruckman and forward, winning their best and fairest award in 1964.

Following the end of his playing career, Manson commentated on Tasmanian Football League matches for Hobart television station TVT6's (later known as Tas-TV and WIN) World Of Sport program from the 1970s until the early 1990s.

Manson was inducted into the Tasmanian Football Hall of Fame in 2009.

Manson was first elected to the Glenorchy City Council in 1996 and served as the council's deputy mayor from 2005 until his death.

Manson's son James was also a leading Australian rules footballer, playing 167 Australian Football League (AFL) games and was a member of the Collingwood Football Club team that won the 1990 AFL Premiership.
