= Gayfer =

Gayfer is an English-language surname. People with the name include:

- Harry Gayfer (1925–2021), Australian politician
- James Gayfer (1916–1997), Canadian musician
- Michael Gayfer (born 1965), Australian rules footballer

== See also ==
- Gayfers, a department store based in Mobile, Alabama
