= Gavin Brown (footballer) =

Australian rules footballer, born 1967

Personal information
- Born: 25 September 1967 (age 59)
- Original team: Templestowe/Marcellin College
- Height: 184 cm (6 ft 0 in)
- Weight: 88 kg (194 lb)

Playing career
| Years | Club | Games (Goals) |
| 1987–2000 | Collingwood | 254 (195) |

Career highlights
- Club: 3× Collingwood Best & Fairest: 1989, 1994, 1997; 2× All-Australian team: 1991, 1994; 2× AFLPA Robert Rose Award 1991, 1992; Collingwood Premiership player: 1990; Collingwood Captain: 1994–1998; Wrecker Award: 1994, 1998; Australian Football Hall of Fame; Collingwood Hall of Fame; Collingwood Team of the Century – interchange; Representative: 2× E. J. Whitten Medal: 1989, 1997; Victorian captain: 1997

Gavin Brown (born 25 September 1967) is a former Australian rules footballer who represented Collingwood in the Australian Football League (AFL) during the late 1980s, 1990s, and early 2000s. Since retiring as a player he has been an assistant coach with Collingwood, Carlton and joined North Melbourne at the end of the 2013 season. He is currently serving as a development coach at North Melbourne.

Brown was a player for the Magpies throughout his career. He was able to play as a key forward or a defender.

A former Marcellin College student, he was part of their 1st XVIII to win both the 1984 Associated Grammar Schools premiership as well as the coveted Herald Shield Cup, which was captained by Carlton champion Stephen Silvagni.

== Early life and playing career ==
Brown was recruited into Collingwood Magpies from Templestowe where he contributed to the side for over a decade. Brown was part of the Magpies under-19 premiership side in 1986 with Damian Monkhorst, Mick McGuane and Gavin Crosisca, who all made their debuts with the senior side in 1987. Brown quickly showed his true value as a tough and courageous footballer, and a great man off the field. He earned the nickname "Rowdy" because of his quiet demeanour off the field. Brown started well in his career, earning his first Victorian guernsey in State of Origin football in his debut season.

In 1989, Brown turned into a great young footballer, winning the Copeland Trophy, awarded to the club's best and fairest player, after finishing third the year before. In the same year, he made an impact against South Australia in State of Origin, winning the EJ Whitten Medal. His good form continued into 1990 when he played an important part in Collingwood winning the premiership, their first in 32 years. Brown played mainly as a forward, after starting his career as a wingman. He was knocked out in the quarter-time brawl in the grand final against Essendon, but returned late in the game and kicked his second goal. A year later, Brown continued his enthusiastic and courageous work on the field and finished runner-up in the best and fairest as well as earning his first All-Australian selection as a half-forward.

Brown was known as a courageous player and the AFL Players Association awarded him the inaugural Robert Rose Award for Most Courageous Player in 1991 and again in 1992.

In 1994, Brown was rewarded for his hard work with the captaincy, and he played solid football. He gained his second All-Australian selection, and he won his second Copeland Trophy, finishing equal with recruit Nathan Buckley. He suffered hamstring injuries in 1995–1996, which hampered his career, but in 1997 he made a comeback, winning his third Copeland Trophy. He also captained the state side against South Australia, winning a second E. J. Whitten Medal for his best-on-ground performance due to a brilliant job on Darren Jarman.

Brown handed over the Magpies' captaincy to Nathan Buckley at the end of 1998 despite his willingness to keep the leadership role. As his career was coming to an end, he continued to play good football in 1999 despite the team's lack of success and was impressive with the youngsters around him, with another top-three finish in the best and fairest. He retired at the end of 2000.

== Statistics ==
Legend
| G | Goals | K | Kicks | D | Disposals | T | Tackles |
| B | Behinds | H | Handballs | M | Marks |

| Season | Team | No. | Games | Totals | | | | | | | Averages (per game) | | | | | | | Votes |
| Season | Team | No. | Games | G | B | K | H | D | M | T | G | B | K | H | D | M | T | Votes |
|---|---|---|---|---|---|---|---|---|---|---|---|---|---|---|---|---|---|---|
| 1987 | Collingwood | 26 | 16 | 7 | 4 | 179 | 81 | 260 | 54 | 27 | 0.4 | 0.3 | 11.2 | 5.1 | 16.3 | 3.4 | 1.7 | 0 |
| 1988 | Collingwood | 26 | 23 | 6 | 4 | 282 | 211 | 493 | 107 | 37 | 0.3 | 0.2 | 12.3 | 9.2 | 21.4 | 4.7 | 1.6 | 3 |
| 1989 | Collingwood | 26 | 22 | 11 | 27 | 330 | 186 | 516 | 129 | 25 | 0.5 | 1.2 | 15.0 | 8.5 | 23.5 | 5.9 | 1.1 | 9 |
| 1990† | Collingwood | 26 | 18 | 49 | 24 | 209 | 106 | 315 | 132 | 19 | 2.7 | 1.3 | 11.6 | 5.9 | 17.5 | 7.3 | 1.1 | 4 |
| 1991 | Collingwood | 26 | 18 | 15 | 21 | 246 | 211 | 457 | 129 | 29 | 0.8 | 1.2 | 13.7 | 11.7 | 25.4 | 7.2 | 1.6 | 9 |
| 1992 | Collingwood | 26 | 16 | 9 | 9 | 207 | 108 | 315 | 102 | 25 | 0.6 | 0.6 | 12.9 | 6.8 | 19.7 | 6.4 | 1.6 | 7 |
| 1993 | Collingwood | 26 | 12 | 9 | 6 | 125 | 74 | 199 | 53 | 11 | 0.8 | 0.5 | 10.4 | 6.2 | 16.6 | 4.4 | 0.9 | 7 |
| 1994 | Collingwood | 26 | 21 | 17 | 7 | 245 | 219 | 464 | 95 | 51 | 0.8 | 0.3 | 11.7 | 10.4 | 22.1 | 4.5 | 2.4 | 4 |
| 1995 | Collingwood | 26 | 16 | 11 | 7 | 163 | 126 | 289 | 64 | 46 | 0.7 | 0.4 | 10.2 | 7.9 | 18.1 | 4.0 | 2.9 | 1 |
| 1996 | Collingwood | 26 | 20 | 10 | 11 | 120 | 140 | 260 | 68 | 23 | 0.5 | 0.6 | 6.0 | 7.0 | 13.0 | 3.4 | 1.2 | 1 |
| 1997 | Collingwood | 26 | 22 | 1 | 4 | 171 | 206 | 377 | 106 | 36 | 0.0 | 0.2 | 7.8 | 9.4 | 17.1 | 4.8 | 1.6 | 10 |
| 1998 | Collingwood | 26 | 16 | 5 | 5 | 136 | 100 | 236 | 84 | 25 | 0.3 | 0.3 | 8.5 | 6.3 | 14.8 | 5.3 | 1.6 | 0 |
| 1999 | Collingwood | 26 | 19 | 31 | 15 | 131 | 99 | 230 | 66 | 15 | 1.6 | 0.8 | 6.9 | 5.2 | 12.1 | 3.5 | 0.8 | 2 |
| 2000 | Collingwood | 26 | 15 | 14 | 6 | 77 | 59 | 136 | 52 | 14 | 0.9 | 0.4 | 5.1 | 3.9 | 9.1 | 3.5 | 0.9 | 0 |
| Career | | | 254 | 195 | 150 | 2621 | 1926 | 4547 | 1241 | 383 | 0.8 | 0.6 | 10.3 | 7.6 | 17.9 | 4.9 | 1.5 | 57 |

== Post-playing career ==
Brown became an assistant coach to Mick Malthouse after retiring, and in 2002 was awarded a spot in the Collingwood Team of the Century, as the fourth interchange player. He was also an inaugural inductee in the Collingwood Football Club Hall of Fame. In 2008 he was appointed senior coach of Collingwood's newly created VFL side.

In 2008, he was inducted into the Australian Football Hall of Fame.

In 2011, Brown moved to the Carlton Football Club, taking on an assistant coaching role. After three seasons there, he signed with North Melbourne, also as an assistant coach.

Brown's three children, sons Callum, Tyler and daughter Tarni have all played or are playing for Collingwood in the AFL or AFLW leagues.
