= Sanford Wheeler =

Australian rules footballer (1970–2020)

Personal information
- Full name: Sanford Matthew Wheeler
- Born: 6 April 1970; Lynwood, California, U.S.
- Died: 10 March 2020 (aged 49); California, U.S.
- Original team: Parramatta (Sydney AFL)
- Debut: Round 6, 6 May 1989, Sydney Swans vs. St Kilda, at Moorabbin Oval
- Height: 186 cm (6 ft 1 in)
- Weight: 90 kg (198 lb)

Playing career^{1}
Years	Club	Games (Goals)
1989–1994	Sydney Swans	43 (7)
- ^{1} Playing statistics correct to the end of 1994.

Sanford Matthew Wheeler (6 April 1970 – 10 March 2020) was an Australian rules football player for the Sydney Swans. He is notable for being the first African American-born player in the history of the AFL and one of the few players from the United States to play in the Australian Football League.

== Early life ==
Wheeler was born in Lynwood, California, to an Australian father and an African-American mother. He migrated with his family to Sydney, New South Wales, at the age of 5. Wheeler briefly moved to Melbourne during his primary school years but later returned to Sydney.

A Fitzroy supporter, Wheeler took an interest in playing multiple sports as a junior, from athletics to soccer and rugby league. By the age of 13, Wheeler had migrated to playing Australian football for local club Seven Hills after spotting an advertisement at a shopping centre. After five seasons at the club, he transferred to Parramatta, from which he was recruited.

== Playing career ==
Wheeler was recruited to the Sydney Swans via zone allocation in 1988 at the age of 18. However, he grew tired of coach Tom Hafey's training regimes and left the club mid-season. Wheeler was welcomed back to Sydney the following year under new coach Col Kinnear, and subsequently made his Victorian Football League debut in a much-depleted Swans team in round 6, 1989, against St Kilda. However, his first game was not notable, and he was dropped for the next couple of months. Showing some form in the reserves, Wheeler reappeared in round 20 against Melbourne with a more satisfactory performance, kicking a goal. He began to establish himself in the senior side and made 11 appearances the following season in the newly renamed Australian Football League.

During his playing career, Wheeler was distinct for his bulky yet athletic frame and his braided ponytail, exhibiting dash and flair off the wing, and also served as a rugged, rebounding defender off the half-back flank. His quick run and hard tackling were trademarks of his game. However, Wheeler's disposal skills let him down, and he had a tendency to get caught holding the ball. He also played the majority of his career during the Swans' darkest era, during which they "won" three successive wooden spoons from 1992 to 1994 during a time of financial turmoil for the club.

Wheeler's career highlight came in 1992, where he was selected in the New South Wales state team in their state of origin match against Queensland. Wheeler was again selected for the state team the following year, this time in a combined team with the Australian Capital Territory for their match against Victoria at the 1993 State of Origin Championships. At the time, Wheeler was the subject of an impromptu fan club, who took mock credit for his selection. Many considered Wheeler to be the Swan's most improved player that season.

After a serious knee injury and the tendency to be used sparingly by coach Ron Barassi, Wheeler was delisted following the 1994 season as part of a shake-up of the Swans' list.

== After football ==
Following his football career, Wheeler returned to the United States and became a wealth management advisor at Merrill Lynch Bank of America in Indian Wells.

== Personal life ==
During school and in his early football days, Wheeler went by his middle name, Matthew, to avoid being bullied for his uncommon given name; he continued to use Sanford around family and friends. Ahead of the 1993 season, Wheeler reverted to going by Sanford in everyday life.

== Death ==
Wheeler died in California on 10 March 2020 at the age of 49.
