= Peter Cransberg =

Australian rules footballer

Personal information
- Full name: Peter Hendrik Cransberg
- Born: 29 July 1967 (age 59)
- Original team: East Perth
- Height: 190 cm (6 ft 3 in)
- Weight: 87 kg (192 lb)
- Position: Forward/Ruck

Playing career^{1}
| Years | Club | Games (Goals) |
| 1987-1989 | East Perth | 44 (37) |
| 1990–1997 | Essendon | 79 (72) |
| Total | | 123 (109) |
- ^{1} Playing statistics correct to the end of 1997.

Peter Hendrik Cransberg (born 29 July 1967) is a former Australian rules footballer who played for Essendon in the Australian Football League (AFL) during the 1990s.

Cransberg was picked up by Essendon from East Perth with pick 39 in the 1989 VFL draft. He played on a half forward flank in the 1990 Grand Final but finished on the losing team. Cransberg struggled at times to keep his place in the strong Essendon side, often due to injury, and spent much of his career in the reserves. He did manage to play in a couple of Essendon Night Premierships.

His brother, Alan Cransberg, is the current chairman of the West Coast Eagles.
