= Alan Cransberg =

Australian rules footballer and businessman

Personal information
- Full name: Alan John Cransberg
- Born: 22 September 1958 (age 68); Bunbury, Western Australia
- Original team: South Bunbury

Playing career^{1}
Years	Club	Games (Goals)
1976–83	Swan Districts	115 (33)
- ^{1} Playing statistics correct to the end of 1983.

Career highlights
- Swan Districts premiership side 1982, 1983

Alan John Cransberg (born 22 September 1958) is an Australian businessman and former Australian rules footballer who is the current chairman of the West Coast Eagles in the Australian Football League, as well as a member of the boards of several other organisations. Cransberg grew up in Bunbury, Western Australia, attending Bunbury Senior High School. He played for the South Bunbury Football Club in the South West Football League, before being recruited by the Swan Districts Football Club in the Perth-based Western Australian National Football League prior to the 1976 season. Cransberg went on to play 115 games for Swan Districts, mainly playing as a defender. He played at centre half-back in Swan Districts' 1982 premiership team, and also played in the premiership side the following season, retiring after the 1983 season to concentrate on his business career. Cransberg graduated from the University of Western Australia in 1980 with an honours degree in civil engineering. He joined Alcoa Australia after his graduation, and held various planning, engineering and managerial positions from 1981 to 1997, before being appointed location manager of the company's Pinjarra alumina refinery in 1998.

In 2001, Cransberg moved to Texas to become location manager of the Point Comfort alumina refinery and chemicals complex, and, in 2003, he was made President, Primary Metals United States Division, with his title expanded in 2004 to president, Primary Metals North America Division. From 2004, he was president, Global Manufacturing for Alcoa's Global Primary Products group, based in New York City, and later served as chairman of Alcoa's Employee Relations Council. Cransberg was made a vice-president of Alcoa in 2006. Returning to Australia in 2008, he was promoted to the position of managing director of Alcoa Australia. In this role, he participated in the Australia 2020 Summit as part of the "Productivity Agenda" group. He joined the West Coast Eagles' board in 2008, and was appointed chairman for the 2011 season, taking over from Mark Barnaba. Cransberg currently also holds board positions with the Australian Institute of Management, the Chamber of Commerce and Industry of Western Australia and the Black Swan State Theatre Company, and is also involved with the Australia Business Arts Foundation in a counselling position. He currently lives in Mandurah, and is married with four children. Cransberg's brother, Peter Cransberg, was also a footballer, and played for East Perth and Essendon.

Sporting positions
Preceded by Mark Barnaba	Chairman of the West Coast Eagles; 2010+	Succeeded by incumbent
