= Denis Banks =

Australian rules footballer, born 1959

Personal information
- Full name: Denis Banks
- Born: 16 June 1959 (age 67)
- Original team: East Reservoir
- Height: 185 cm (6 ft 1 in)
- Weight: 81 kg (179 lb)
- Position: Centre half forward

Playing career^{1}
Years	Club	Games (Goals)
1979–1991	Collingwood	166 (111)
- ^{1} Playing statistics correct to the end of 1991.

Career highlights
- VFL Team of the Year: 1984; Collingwood Premiership side: 1990; Mark of the Year: 1984; Runner-up Copeland Trophy: 1984

Denis Banks (born 16 June 1959) is a former Australian rules footballer who played for the Collingwood Football Club in the VFL/AFL.

Banks was from East Reservoir and played as a centre-half-forward, but injuries prevented him from developing into a key position player. He made his debut in 1979 and played in the losing Grand Final side for the Magpies. In 1984 he won a spot in the VFL's Team of the Year.

Banks was nearing the end of his career in 1990, but played another season and won a premiership medal in the drought-breaking Grand Final for Collingwood. He retired in 1991, a year after premiership success. Banks was inducted into the Collingwood Hall of Fame in 2007.
