= Shane Kerrison =

Australian rules footballer

Personal information
- Born: 28 March 1965 (age 61); Melbourne
- Original team: Heidelberg
- Height: 180 cm (5 ft 11 in)
- Weight: 84 kg (185 lb)

Playing career^{1}
Years	Club	Games (Goals)
1986–1995	Collingwood	141 (15)
- ^{1} Playing statistics correct to the end of 1995.

Career highlights
- 1990 premiership player

Shane Kerrison (born 28 March 1965) is a former Australian rules footballer who played for Collingwood in the Australian Football League (AFL). He was a late inclusion in Collingwood's team for the 1990 Grand Final, replacing Alan Richardson, and was one of the best afield in the Pies' victory over Essendon. Wearing the number 44 jumper throughout his career, Kerrison retired at the end of 1995, but remained as a runner for Collingwood in the ensuing years.
