= Heidelberg Football Club =

Names
- Full name: Heidelberg Football Club
- Nickname(s): Tigers, Bergers

Club details
- Founded: 1876
- Colours: Black Yellow
- Competition: NFNL: Senior men NFNLW: Senior women YJFL: Juniors (mixed)
- Chairperson: Tim Wilson
- Coach: Vince Dattoli
- Captain: Keenan Posar
- Ground: Warringal Park

Other information
- Official website: heidelbergfnc.com.au

The Heidelberg Football Club is an Australian rules football club in Heidelberg, Victoria, currently competing in the Northern Football League.

The club also has a junior side, known as the Heidelberg Junior Football Club, which competes in the Yarra Junior Football League.

== History ==
Established in 1876, Heidelberg Football Club is one of the oldest Australian rules football clubs in the country. The club initially competed in the Melbourne Football League against other suburban clubs such as Northcote, Waverley, South Melbourne and Sandridge. Heidelberg's original guernsey was blue and white until adopting the current strip of yellow and black during the 1880s.

Heidelberg has competed in many different football leagues during its history. Commencing in the Melbourne Football League, the club was a founding member of Bourke-Evelyn Football League in 1890. In 1903, Heidelberg transferred to the Northern Suburban Football League. The club was a founding member of Heidelberg District Football League in 1909 before transferring to the fledgling Diamond Valley Football League in 1923.

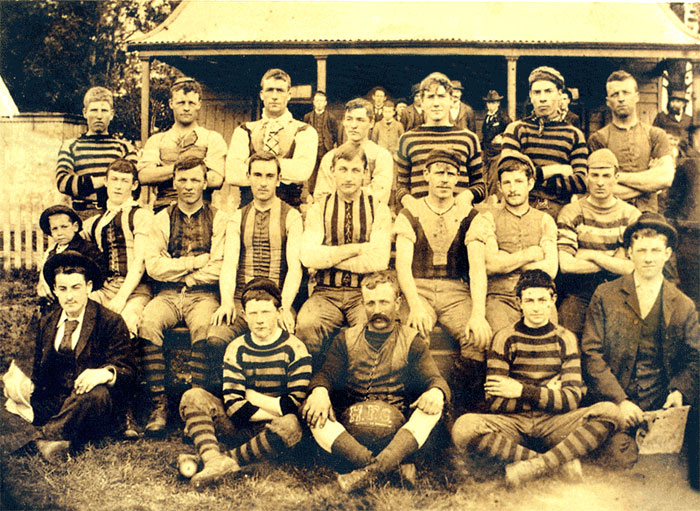
Heidelberg Football Club c.1897

Heidelberg's dominance of the DVFL led to the club moving temporarily to VFL Sub-Districts League in 1925 whilst still successfully fielding a second team in the DVFL (known as Heidelberg Juniors at the time). The club returned exclusively to the DVFL in 1930 and has remained in this league since with considerable success. The junior club now resides in the YJFL.

The club has won a total 27 senior premierships including a record 19 in the Northern Football League, the first being in 1890, and the most recent in 2009.

The original home ground was at Heidelberg Park, but after a recess during the World War 2, the club moved across Beverley Road to the current address at Warringal Park.

At the end of the 1980 season the bottom four clubs were to be relegated to a newly formed Second Division in 1981 so Heidelberg having finished 13th (third last) was relegated. After three seasons in Division Two the club earned promotion with a breakthrough Grand Final victory over Northcote Park in 1983. After two respectable years in 1984/85 the club then went on to achieve Division one success in 1986 and then again in 1990.

Heidelberg became the inaugural Northern Football League Premier and Champion in 2007, going through the season undefeated. Heidelberg were the last Diamond Valley Football League Premier in 2006 after a formal audit by Football Victoria forced the league to change its name, this was initially caused by concerns expressed by the club while attempting to transfer to the Eastern FL. In 2009 Heidelberg completed a four peat of Premierships defeating Bundoora in the Grand Final, (equaling the League record of 4 in a row) and making it five wins from the past six Grand Finals.

Heidelberg defeated Macleod to win the 2016 premiership. Their first premiership since 2009.

Heidelberg holds the record for the longest winning sequence in DVFL/NFL history with 48 wins in a row (round 3 2008 to round 10 2010)

Heidelberg first entered a women's side into the Northern Football Netball League for the start of the 2019 season, winning its first competitive game 162 to 0 over Hurstbridge.

== Premierships ==
=== Northern Football League (Formerly Diamond Valley Football League) ===
==== Division 1 ====
- Seniors: (24)

1923, 1928, 1929, 1937, 1938, 1948, 1950, 1956, 1957, 1959, 1964, 1986, 1990, 2004, 2006, 2007, 2008, 2009, 2016, 2022, 2023, 2024, 2025, 2026

- Reserves: (17)

1950, 1951, 1953, 1956, 1960, 1963, 1967, 2000, 2001, 2004, 2007, 2008, 2013, 2016, 2023, 2024, 2025

- Thirds: (4)

1980, 2024, 2025, 2026

==== Division 2 ====
- Seniors: (1)

1983

- Reserves: (1)

1981

=== Bourke-Evelyn Football League ===
- Seniors: (1)

1890

=== Northern Suburban Football League ===
- Seniors: (2)

1905, 1908

=== Heidelberg District Football League ===
- Seniors: (5)

1910, 1911, 1912, 1919, 1920

== Notable players ==
- Fred Clarke (Richmond)
- John Murphy (Fitzroy, North Melbourne & South Melbourne)
- Brian Wilson (Footscray, North Melbourne, Melbourne & St Kilda)
- Jim Edmond (Footscray, Sydney & Brisbane Bears)
- Geoff Austen (Fitzroy & Collingwood)
- Bill Twomey Sr. (Collingwood)
- Pat Twomey (Collingwood)
- Shane Kerrison (Collingwood)
- John Wise (Collingwood)
- Pasi Schwalger (Samoan National Soccer Player)
- Ty Zantuck (Richmond & Essendon)
- Jess Sinclair (Fremantle & North Melbourne)
- Justin Murphy (Richmond, Carlton, Geelong & Essendon)
- Brad Miller (Melbourne & Richmond)
- Anthony Franchina (Carlton)
- Renato Serafini (Fitzroy & Carlton)
- Blair McDonough Television personality
- Michael Brunelli Television personality
