= Anzac Day match =

Traditional Australian football match

Coordinates: 37°49′12″S 144°59′00″E

Anzac Day match (AFL)
- Anzac Appeal Logo used as the official logo for the Anzac Day match

- Collingwood Essendon
- First meeting: 25 April 1995 (Collingwood 111–111 Essendon)
- Latest meeting: 25 April 2026 (Collingwood 137–60 Essendon)
- Stadiums: Melbourne Cricket Ground 1995–Present
- Trophy: ANZAC Day Trophy

Statistics
- Total meetings: 31
- All-time series (Australian Football League only): Collingwood (19 wins); Draw(s) (2); Essendon (10 wins)
- Largest victory: Collingwood (77 Points); 25 April 2026
- Longest win streak: Collingwood 3 (x4); 25 April 1996 – 25 April 1998; 25 April 2006 - 25 April 2008; 25 April 2010 - 25 April 2012; 25 April 2014 - 25 April 2016
- Longest unbeaten streak: Collingwood 5; 25 April 2022 – Present
- Current unbeaten streak: Collingwood 5; 25 April 2022 – Present

The Anzac Day match is an annual Australian rules football match between Collingwood and Essendon, two clubs in the Australian Football League, held on Anzac Day (25 April) at the Melbourne Cricket Ground (MCG).

Collingwood and Essendon have played each other 31 times in the Anzac Day match, with the head to head currently in Collingwood's favour, with Collingwood's 19 wins to Essendon's 10 wins, and 2 draws.

== History of Australian rules football on Anzac Day ==
During many wars, Australian rules football matches have been played overseas in places like northern Africa and Vietnam as a celebration of Australian culture and as a bonding exercise between soldiers. Despite this, League football was not played on Anzac Day for many years; in 1959, for example, when all VFL games were played on Saturday afternoons, Anzac Day also fell on a Saturday, and the entire round was postponed to the following Saturday. The first VFL matches played on Anzac Day occurred in 1960 after an Act of Parliament which lifted the previous restrictions on this activity.

The Anzac Day Act required a donation of a portion of ticket sales to the RSL, so the RSL was active in encouraging the VFL to play on the day. The VFL was initially unenthusiastic, and on Anzac Day Tuesday in 1961 it scheduled smaller games at Windy Hill and Punt Road Oval for the day. The Victorian Football Association attempted to capitalise on this, and with the RSL's support it moved a marquee match between rivals Sandringham and Moorabbin to the Melbourne Cricket Ground and put on a pre-match spectacle on a similar scale to that of the AFL's modern Anzac Day clash. The crowd of just under 14,000 was similar in size to the VFA's largest Sunday crowds at the time, but it still fell well short of the VFA's pre-match expectations; nevertheless, the match was a pioneer in the treatment of football on Anzac Day as a special occasion.

In 1962 and 1967, instead of playing premiership matches on Anzac Day, the VFL arranged a representative match for Anzac Day between the Victorian team from the previous year's Interstate Carnival and a team representing the rest of the league. Both matches drew small crowds between 15,000 and 20,000.

Eventually, the VFL did begin to play matches on Anzac Day. These games sometimes drew huge crowds. The 1975 Carlton–Essendon game attracted 77,770 fans to VFL Park, an Anzac Day record at the time; two years later, in 1977, Richmond and Collingwood drew 92,436 to the MCG.

In 1986, the league used Anzac Day to attempt its first ever single-venue doubleheader. Held at the MCG, Melbourne and Sydney played in the afternoon, followed after a 30-minute break by North Melbourne and Geelong in the evening under lights. Due to a total crowd of only 40,117 and various logistical problems, the League would not stage another single-venue doubleheader at any venue again until the establishment of the Gather Round in 2023.

Through the years until the mid-1990s, it was common for at least two matches to be played on the Anzac Day public holiday.

== History of Anzac Day match ==
The modern version of the Anzac Day match was conceived by then Essendon senior coach Kevin Sheedy while pottering in his garden in the mid-1990s. Sheedy, who had served two years in the army after being drafted to Richmond in 1969, thought back to the success of the Collingwood–Richmond game in 1977, and he considered how football on Anzac Day could pay suitable tribute to those who had served their country. Sheedy organised a meeting with officials from Essendon and Collingwood—as well as the then Victorian RSL President Bruce Ruxton, who was also a keen Collingwood supporter—and proposed his concept for a game which would honour the Anzac spirit. Despite their previous opposition to football on Anzac Day, Ruxton and the RSL agreed with Sheedy's proposal, as did the AFL.

The first modern, specially scheduled Anzac Day match between Collingwood and Essendon was played on Tuesday, 25 April 1995 at the MCG. The Round 4 match received limited publicity, as there had previously been AFL matches played on 25 April, including Essendon, who had earned a 1-point win after trailing Melbourne by 47 points in the early stages of the final quarter in Round 6, 1992. Essendon had won its first three games of the season; however, Collingwood were without a victory at that point in the season. Soon after the Anzac Day march in the city, patrons flocked to the ground. Crowds outside the ground were so substantial at 12.30pm that Collingwood coach Leigh Matthews thought the gates to the ground must have still been locked. When the gates were closed at 1.30 pm—still 40 minutes before the start of the match—20,000 additional people had to be dispersed by mounted police while would-be gatecrashers attempted to gain admission into the stadium. Thousands of these people descended on nearby Fitzroy Gardens, where they listened to the match on radio.

Played on a sunny autumn day, both teams kicked six goals in the first quarter. A three-goal-to-one second quarter helped Essendon lead by 16 points at half time. However, the momentum swayed in the third quarter, when Collingwood kicked seven goals to two, giving them a 14-point lead at the break. Essendon started strongly in the final term, and when James Hird snapped a goal late in the quarter, he gave his team a six-point advantage. Saverio "Sav" Rocca leapt and took "one of the marks of the year" in the forward line soon after. At the 28-minute mark, he capitalised by kicking the goal and levelling the scores. With just seconds left, Nathan Buckley had an opportunity to score; however, he elected to kick to Rocca, who was cut off. Seconds later, the siren sounded; both teams' scores were 111. Roars from the 94,825-strong crowd during the match could easily be heard from a kilometre away, and the crowd remains the third-highest home-and-away crowd in VFL/AFL history. The 2023 Anzac Day match drew a crowd of 95,179, the second-biggest home-and-away crowd in AFL history, surpassed only by the 99,346 who attended the Collingwood–Melbourne Queen's Birthday match in 1958.

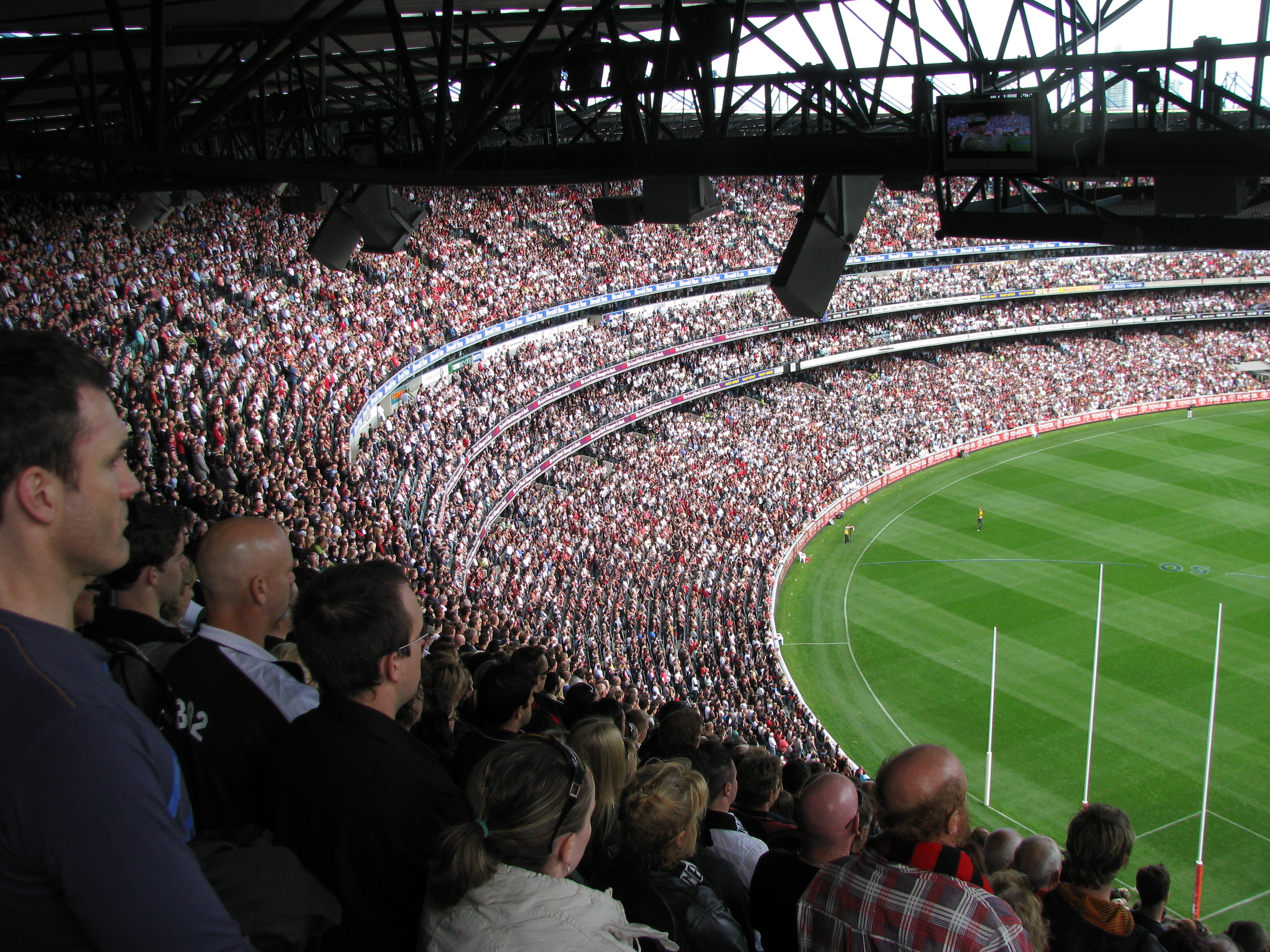
A crowd of over 90,000 attends the annual Anzac Day Collingwood–Essendon game (2010)

Today, this game is often considered the biggest match of the AFL season outside of the finals, sometimes drawing bigger crowds than all but the Grand Final, and often selling out in advance. As a point of comparison, in the National Rugby League, the Sydney Roosters and St. George Illawarra Dragons have played on Anzac Day since 2002, but generally without the increase in crowd numbers compared to other games as seen in the AFL. However, Anzac Day matches have been a regular part of the rugby league season for over 80 years.

The Seven Network held broadcasting rights to the Collingwood–Essendon match from its inception in 1995 until 2001. Following this, the Nine Network (2002–06) and Network Ten (2007–09, and 2011) had the broadcasting rights, with the Seven Network broadcasting it in 2010. From the 2012 season onwards, the Seven Network regained the broadcasting rights to the match.

In recent years, other clubs and some sections of the media have lobbied for the game to be shared amongst all clubs, not just Collingwood and Essendon. Since 1996, one year after the team's inception, Fremantle has held the Len Hall Tribute Game, named in honour of Western Australia's last Gallipoli veteran. This game is regularly held on Anzac Day as a Western Australian featured game. With Anzac Day falling on a Saturday in 2009, four games were scheduled for the day, yet the largest fixture (the MCG) continued to host Collingwood and Essendon at the exclusion of other clubs. Critics have argued that this venue fixture should be shared.

== Meaning and significance ==
For many people, the clash may be their closest involvement with Anzac Day remembrance services. Before the match, a special Anzac Day service is held at the MCG. This ceremony includes the recognition of Australian War Veterans as well as a Flag Ceremony, including the playing of the "Last Post", "God Defend New Zealand" and "Advance Australia Fair".

Sydney-based journalist and former Australian rugby union national representative player Peter FitzSimons commented in the Sydney Morning Herald of the 2008 game that he had:

...rarely seen something so impressive in the world of sport. As they played the Last Post and the national anthem, the 100,000-strong crowd [sic] uttered not a peep, whispered not a murmur. The atmosphere was electric and the general mood in the air one of reverence for the diggers and anticipation of the game to come...Somewhere, someone has done a superb job organising that landmark day in Australian sport.

The Collingwood Football Club asserts:

The Anzac Day blockbuster between Collingwood and Essendon has become one of our biggest national sporting events ... The Anzac Day match pays tribute to the sacrifice of the servicemen and women of Australia and celebrates the Anzac spirit – courage, sacrifice, endurance and mateship.

Collingwood's former president Eddie McGuire has stated that "veterans will see the reason why they fought so hard for the Australian culture with two great tribes going at each other".

Conversely, some commentators such as Francis Leach, Liz Porter, Chris Fotinopoulos and Ruby Murray have criticised the Australian Football League for the way it promotes the event, arguing that it has exploited the sacredness and solemnity of the Anzac story for the purpose of financial profit. According to Porter:

The commodification of "the Anzac spirit" as an AFL marketing device appears to have begun with the 1995 Essendon-Collingwood clash, after which a commemorative poster of the game was produced, bearing the words "Lest we forget". A solemn pledge was reborn as an advertising slogan.

Also the subject of criticism have been the comments often made in relation to the game by the AFL, sports journalists, media personalities, club officials, coaches and some sections of the media which conflate the Anzac spirit at Gallipoli with the fighting spirit on the football ground. In the opinion of Fotinopoulos, "the real meaning of Anzac Day has become distorted by slick marketing campaigns designed to pass footballers off as war heroes." These criticisms were highlighted in 2009 when Collingwood coach Mick Malthouse stated that his team had "let the Anzacs down" in losing the game, and that "Essendon showed true Anzac spirit, the reason why we play here." Journalist Patrick Smith responded in The Australian that this comparison between the game of football and the sadness and bravery of war "belittles and trivialises the suffering of the men and women which Anzac Day is set aside to remember and thank." In a subsequent article, Smith argued:

The AFL itself is in danger of manipulating Anzac Day. The commission is looking to play more games than the traditional Essendon-Collingwood match which had previously been set aside as the code's mark of respect. To play more matches around the country is to move uneasily close to a ratings and money-making tool. Given that bravery and commitment in war is acknowledged with medals, the AFL seeks to capitalise on that with awarding the Anzac Medal to the best player on Anzac Day. On reflection, that is bordering on tacky.

The trophy awarded to the winning team each year has etched on it the names of football players who died during war, images of soldiers from the Australian Infantry Forces and the words "Lest We Forget". Furthermore, the cup is made from glass, silver and bronze on a base of ironbark that comes from an ammunition wagon used in service at Villers-Bretonneux during the First World War, whilst the bronze columns supporting the silver bowl incorporate metal salvaged from the Gallipoli battlefields.

== Anzac Medal ==
A best-on-ground player has been named for each of the Anzac Day clashes. Since 2000, the player in the match considered to best exemplify the Anzac spirit—skill, courage, self-sacrifice, teamwork and fair play—has been awarded the AFL Anzac Medal. The most number of Anzac Medal wins is four by Collingwood games record holder and former captain Scott Pendlebury. In 2001, Collingwood's Chris Tarrant became the first—and so far only—player to have won the medal despite playing in the losing team.

Before the start of the 2011 Anzac Day match, the AFL presented retrospective Anzac Medals to their intended recipients for all of the matches prior to the introduction of the medal in 2000.

== Match results ==
	Year	Home Team	Score	Away Team	Score	Ground	Crowd	Result/Winner	M	HRT	H2H	AM
1	1995	Collingwood	17.9 (111)	Essendon	16.15 (111)	Melbourne Cricket Ground	94,825	Draw	0	D		Saverio Rocca* (Col)
2	1996	Essendon	16.9 (105)	Collingwood	17.15 (117)	Melbourne Cricket Ground	87,549	Collingwood	12	W	+1	Scott Russell* (Col)
3	1997	Essendon	10.10 (70)	Collingwood	14.15 (99)	Melbourne Cricket Ground	83,271	Collingwood	29	L	+2	Damian Monkhurst* (Col)
4	1998	Collingwood	15.18 (108)	Essendon	12.16 (88)	Melbourne Cricket Ground	81,542	Collingwood	20	L	+3	Saverio Rocca* (Col)
5	1999	Essendon	15.18 (108)	Collingwood	15.10 (100)	Melbourne Cricket Ground	73,118	Essendon	8	W	+2	Mark Mercuri* (Ess)
6	2000	Collingwood	15.10 (100)	Essendon	21.14 (140)	Melbourne Cricket Ground	88,390	Essendon	40	W	+1	James Hird (Ess)
7	2001	Essendon	15.13 (103)	Collingwood	14.11 (95)	Melbourne Cricket Ground	83,905	Essendon	8	W		Chris Tarrant (Col)
8	2002	Collingwood	9.12 (66)	Essendon	4.9 (33)	Melbourne Cricket Ground	84,894	Collingwood	33	L	+1	Mark McGough (Col)
9	2003	Essendon	23.9 (147)	Collingwood	12.9 (81)	Melbourne Cricket Ground	62,589^	Essendon	66	L		James Hird (Ess)
10	2004	Collingwood	11.13 (79)	Essendon	17.10 (112)	Melbourne Cricket Ground	57,294^	Essendon	33	W	+1	James Hird (Ess)
11	2005	Essendon	11.17 (83)	Collingwood	10.9 (69)	Melbourne Cricket Ground	70,033^	Essendon	14	L	+2	Andrew Lovett (Ess)
12	2006	Collingwood	15.16 (106)	Essendon	12.17 (89)	Melbourne Cricket Ground	91,234	Collingwood	17	W	+1	Ben Johnson (Col)
13	2007	Essendon	11.13 (79)	Collingwood	12.23 (95)	Melbourne Cricket Ground	90,508	Collingwood	16	L		Heath Shaw (Col)
14	2008	Collingwood	23.16 (154)	Essendon	12.9 (81)	Melbourne Cricket Ground	88,999	Collingwood	73	W	+1	Paul Medhurst (Col)
15	2009	Essendon	13.15 (93)	Collingwood	12.16 (88)	Melbourne Cricket Ground	84,829	Essendon	5	L		Paddy Ryder (Ess)
16	2010	Collingwood	18.12 (120)	Essendon	8.7 (55)	Melbourne Cricket Ground	90,070	Collingwood	65	W	+1	Scott Pendlebury (Col)
17	2011	Essendon	11.11 (77)	Collingwood	16.11 (107)	Melbourne Cricket Ground	89,262	Collingwood	30	W	+2	Scott Pendlebury (Col)
18	2012	Collingwood	11.14 (80)	Essendon	11.13 (79)	Melbourne Cricket Ground	86,932	Collingwood	1	L	+3	Dane Swan (Col)
19	2013	Essendon	18.13 (121)	Collingwood	10.15 (75)	Melbourne Cricket Ground	93,373	Essendon	46	W	+2	David Zaharakis (Ess)
20	2014	Collingwood	12.11 (83)	Essendon	8.12 (60)	Melbourne Cricket Ground	91,731	Collingwood	23	W	+3	Dane Swan (Col)
21	2015	Essendon	6.13 (49)	Collingwood	9.15 (69)	Melbourne Cricket Ground	88,395	Collingwood	20	W	+4	Paul Seedsman (Col)
22	2016	Collingwood	22.10 (142)	Essendon	11.7 (73)	Melbourne Cricket Ground	85,082	Collingwood	69	W	+5	Steele Sidebottom (Col)
23	2017	Essendon	15.10 (100)	Collingwood	11.16 (82)	Melbourne Cricket Ground	87,685	Essendon	18	W	+4	Joe Daniher (Ess)
24	2018	Collingwood	14.17 (101)	Essendon	7.10 (52)	Melbourne Cricket Ground	91,440	Collingwood	49	W	+5	Adam Treloar (Col)
25	2019	Essendon	10.9 (69)	Collingwood	10.13 (73)	Melbourne Cricket Ground	92,241	Collingwood	4	W	+6	Scott Pendlebury (Col)
	2020	No match played due to the COVID-19 pandemic										
26	2021	Collingwood	13.7 (85)	Essendon	16.13 (109)	Melbourne Cricket Ground	78,113^^	Essendon	24	W	+5	Darcy Parish (Ess)
27	2022	Essendon	12.10 (82)	Collingwood	15.3 (93)	Melbourne Cricket Ground	84,205	Collingwood	11	W	+6	Jack Ginnivan (Col)
28	2023	Collingwood	13.12 (90)	Essendon	11.11 (77)	Melbourne Cricket Ground	95,179	Collingwood	13	L	+7	Nick Daicos (Col)
29	2024	Essendon	12.13 (85)	Collingwood	12.13 (85)	Melbourne Cricket Ground	93,644	Draw	0	D	+7	Zach Merrett (Ess)
30	2025	Collingwood	16.11 (107)	Essendon	10.6 (66)	Melbourne Cricket Ground	92,044	Collingwood	41	W	+8	Steele Sidebottom (Col)
31	2026	Essendon	9.6 (60)	Collingwood	20.17 (137)	Melbourne Cricket Ground	92,231	Collingwood	77	W	+9	Scott Pendlebury (Col)

* Retrospective medals awarded in 2011, for games from 1995 to 1999, as the first official Anzac Medal was awarded in 2000.

^ Capacity of ground reduced due to redevelopment for the Melbourne 2006 Commonwealth Games.

^^ Capacity of ground reduced due to the COVID-19 pandemic.

Summary results
Football Club	Years Drawn	Total Draws	Years Won	Total Wins	Years Lost	Total Losses	Anzac Medals	Total Medals
Collingwood	1995, 2024	2	1996, 1997, 1998, 2002, 2006, 2007, 2008, 2010, 2011, 2012, 2014, 2015, 2016, 2018, 2019, 2022, 2023, 2025, 2026	19	1999, 2000, 2001, 2003, 2004, 2005, 2009, 2013, 2017, 2021	10	1995, 1996, 1997, 1998, 2001, 2002, 2006, 2007, 2008, 2010, 2011, 2012, 2014, 2015, 2016, 2018, 2019, 2022, 2023, 2025, 2026	20
Essendon	1995, 2024	2	1999, 2000, 2001, 2003, 2004, 2005, 2009, 2013, 2017, 2021	10	1996, 1997, 1998, 2002, 2006, 2007, 2008, 2010, 2011, 2012, 2014, 2015, 2016, 2018, 2019, 2022, 2023, 2025, 2026	19	1999, 2000, 2003, 2004, 2005, 2009, 2013, 2017, 2021, 2024	10

== Other Anzac Day fixtures ==
=== Anzac eve ===
Melbourne vs. Richmond (2015–present)

ANZAC Eve Clash
- First meeting: 24 April 2015
- Latest meeting: 24 April 2026
- Next meeting: 24 April 2027

Statistics
- Total meetings: 11
- All-time series: Melbourne (8 wins); Richmond (3 wins)

Ron Barassi with a serviceman lighting the torch with the Eternal Flame at the Shrine of Remembrance. (Barassi's father was killed in action during the Siege of Tobruk.) This is part of the pre-match ceremony.

On 30 October 2014, the AFL confirmed that Richmond and Melbourne would host an Anzac eve night clash at the MCG starting from the 2015 season.

As part of the pre-match ceremonies, a torch lit from the Eternal Flame at the Shrine of Remembrance is carried to the ground, where it lights a cauldron on an MCG stage to burn for the duration of the match. Players from both sides, including coaches and officials, alongside returned servicemen and women, line up near the flame for the playing of the "Last Post", "God Defend New Zealand" and "Advance Australia Fair". The pre-match ceremony was developed by—and has the full support of—the RSL, the Shrine of Remembrance, and the Australian Defence Force. Ron Barassi, whose father died at Tobruk during World War II in 1941, was the first person to light the cauldron. In 2017, the Anzac eve match drew a crowd of 85,657, the highest ever between the two clubs, ensuring the fixture was continued the following year.

Until 2020, there was no official trophy for the winning team or player's medal for best on ground. Since 2021, the Frank 'Checker' Hughes medal has been awarded to the player judged best afield.

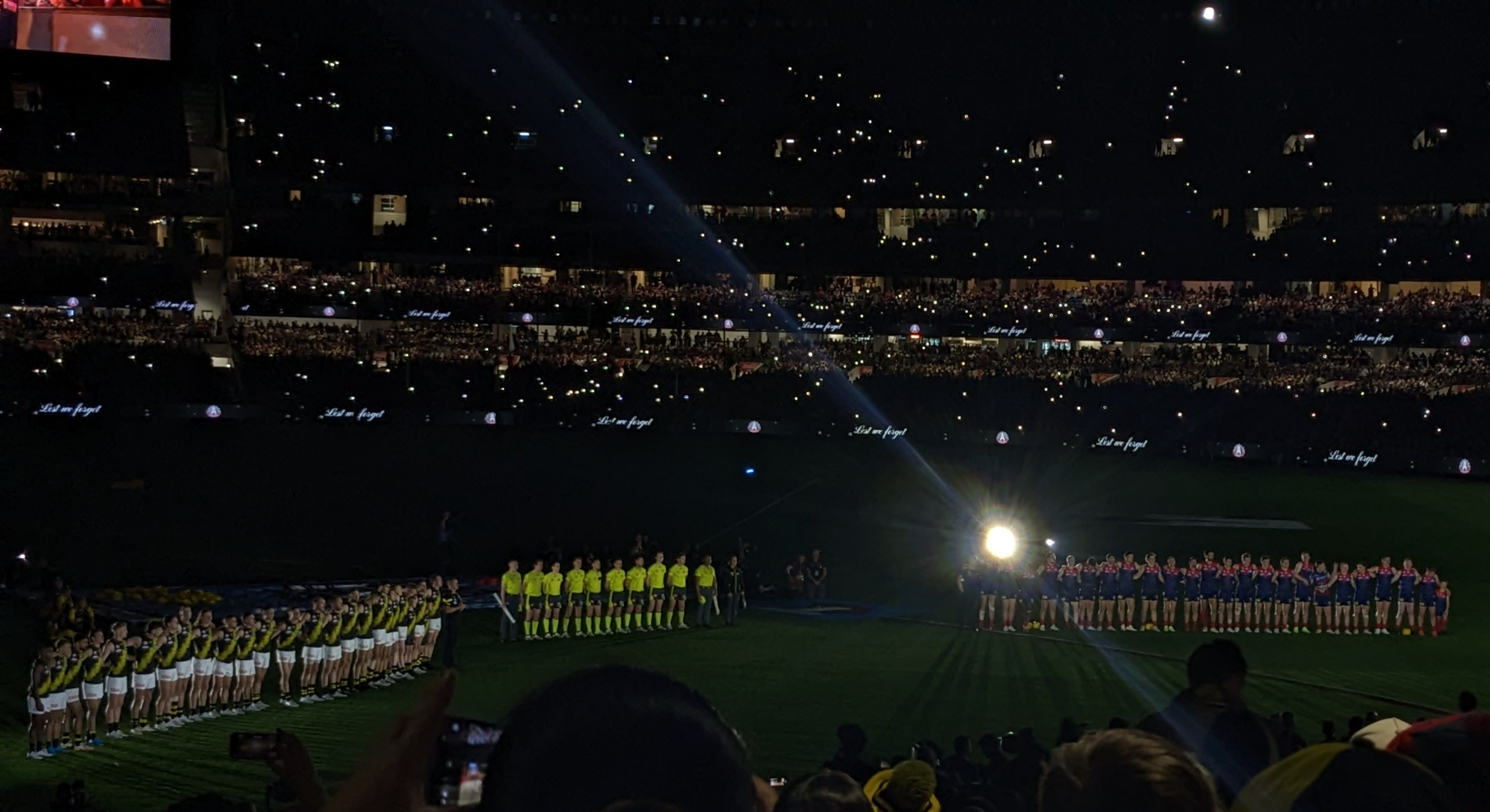
National Anthem ceremony prior to the beginning of the 2023 match

	Year	Home Team	Score	Away Team	Score	Ground	Crowd	Result/Winner	M	H2H	FHM
1	2015	Richmond	6.15 (51)	Melbourne	12.11 (83)	Melbourne Cricket Ground	58,175	Melbourne	32	+1	Nathan Jones* (Mel)
2	2016	Melbourne	20.9 (129)	Richmond	14.12 (96)	Melbourne Cricket Ground	59,968	Melbourne	33	+2	Max Gawn* (Mel)
3	2017	Richmond	12.16 (88)	Melbourne	11.9 (75)	Melbourne Cricket Ground	85,657	Richmond	13	+1	Jack Riewoldt* (Ric)
4	2018	Melbourne	8.8 (56)	Richmond	15.12 (102)	Melbourne Cricket Ground	77,071	Richmond	46		Kane Lambert* (Ric)
5	2019	Richmond	12.13 (85)	Melbourne	6.6 (42)	Melbourne Cricket Ground	72,704	Richmond	43	+1	Nick Vlastuin* (Ric)
	2020	No match played due to the COVID-19 pandemic									
6	2021	Melbourne	12.10 (82)	Richmond	6.12 (48)	Melbourne Cricket Ground	56,418	Melbourne	34		Christian Petracca (Mel)
7	2022	Richmond	8.6 (54)	Melbourne	9.22 (76)	Melbourne Cricket Ground	70,334	Melbourne	22	+1	Clayton Oliver (Mel)
8	2023	Melbourne	15.6 (96)	Richmond	11.12 (78)	Melbourne Cricket Ground	83,985	Melbourne	18	+2	Jack Viney (Mel)
9	2024	Richmond	5.12 (42)	Melbourne	13.7 (85)	Melbourne Cricket Ground	72,840	Melbourne	43	+3	Max Gawn (Mel)
10	2025	Melbourne	12.11 (83)	Richmond	9.9 (63)	Melbourne Cricket Ground	71,635	Melbourne	20	+4	Max Gawn (Mel)
9	2026	Richmond	11.6 (72)	Melbourne	19.12 (126)	Melbourne Cricket Ground	67,364	Melbourne	54	+5	Kysaiah Pickett (Mel)

Note:
Since 2021 the best player afield has been awarded the Frank 'Checker' Hughes Medal. Names listed prior to this date refer to the player who received three Brownlow votes.

=== New Zealand match ===
St Kilda vs. various clubs (2013–2015)

New Zealand ANZAC Day Clash
- First meeting: 25 April 2013
- Latest meeting: 25 April 2015

Statistics
- Total meetings: 3
- All-time series: St Kilda (0 wins); Sydney (1 win); Brisbane Lions (1 win); Carlton (1 win)

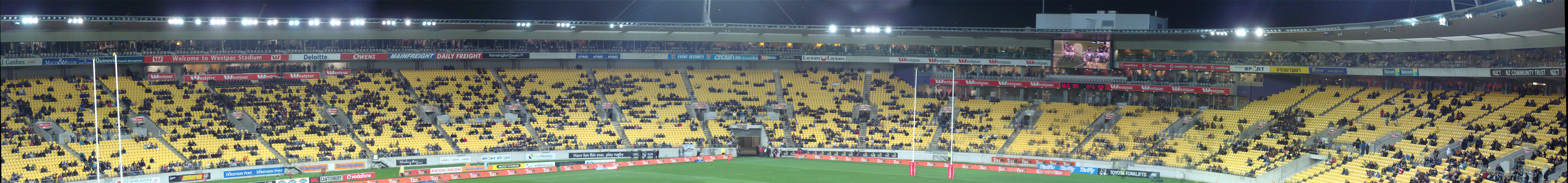
Panorama of Westpac Stadium in Wellington, the home venue for every New Zealand ANZAC Day clash (2013–2015).

The New Zealand ANZAC Day matches were held to commemorate the centenary of the forming of the ANZACs in 1913 through to the centenary of the Gallipoli landings in 1915. In 2013, St Kilda and Sydney played an Anzac Day match in New Zealand in remembrance of the centenary of the forming of the ANZACs in 1913. This was the first AFL game ever played for premiership points outside Australia. The game was played between St Kilda and Sydney as a night game at Westpac Stadium in New Zealand's capital, Wellington, in front of a crowd of 22,546. Sydney won the game by 16 points, scoring 11.13 (79) to St Kilda 9.9 (63), while the first New Zealand–awarded Anzac Medal went to Sydney's Dan Hannebery. Before the game St Kilda captain Nick Riewoldt said "To play on Anzac Day in another country for the first time in the history of the sport is a momentous occasion and as a playing group we feel really privileged to be doing that...".

The game was attended by the Prime Minister of New Zealand, John Key; Australian Minister for Sport, Kate Lundy; and the AFL chief executive, Andrew Demetriou. Key reflected on the significance of the Anzac relationship, commenting shortly before the game began on Australia's immediate assistance following the Christchurch earthquake, and saying "The Anzac spirit is as alive today as it was in 1915". Key also used the occasion to raise the prospect of a New Zealand–based AFL team, saying at the official pre-match function "Let's get real. We've got to get a New Zealand side in the AFL.". While Demetriou would not comment further on Key's statements, he said he planned to chat to Key about it at a later date, and stated New Zealand was "unquestionably our fastest growth market outside Australia".

The winning club received the "Simpson–Henderson Trophy", named in honour of Australian John Simpson Kirkpatrick and New Zealander Richard Alexander Henderson, both known for carrying wounded soldiers from World War I battlefields on donkeys. The New Zealand fixture was retained for the 2014 and 2015 seasons, with the Saints' opponents in those years being the Brisbane Lions and Carlton, respectively. However, the fixture was subsequently scrapped.

	Year	Home Team	Score	Away Team	Score	Ground	Crowd	Result/Winner	M	AM
1	2013	St Kilda	9.9 (63)	Sydney	11.13 (79)	Wellington Regional Stadium	22,546	Sydney	16	Dan Hannebery (Syd)
2	2014	St Kilda	11.13 (79)	Brisbane	12.10 (82)	Wellington Regional Stadium	13,409	Brisbane	3	Leigh Montagna* (StK)
3	2015	St Kilda	12.9 (81)	Carlton	18.13 (121)	Wellington Regional Stadium	12,125	Carlton	40	Marc Murphy* (Car)

=== Len Hall Tribute Game ===
Fremantle vs. various clubs (1996–)

The Len Hall Game is named in tribute to the last Gallipoli veteran from Western Australia, Len Hall (1897–1999). Matches are either played on ANZAC Day itself or over that weekend during the same round.

In April 2025, the Fremantle Dockers announced a new best on ground medal for the upcoming Len Hall Game, the Arthur Leggett Medal, named after Western Australia's last surviving World War II prisoner of war, Arthur Leslie Leggett OAM (1918–2025). Leggett was heavily involved in the Len Hall Tribute Game and had passed away just weeks prior. The inaugural medal was awarded to Fremantle's Andrew Brayshaw after being voted best on ground against the Adelaide Crows.

	Year	Date	Rd	Fremantle Score	Away Team	Score	Ground	Crowd	Winner
1	1996	26/4	5	13.18 (96)	Melbourne	8.11 (59)	WACA Ground	26,618	Fremantle
2	1997	25/4	5	16.11 (107)	St Kilda	15.11 (101)	Subiaco Oval	23,504	Fremantle
3	1998	25/4	5	16.8 (104)	North Melbourne	12.15 (87)	WACA Ground	26,335	Fremantle
4	1999	25/4	5	7.11 (53)	Brisbane	15.18 (108)	Subiaco Oval	24,044	Brisbane
5	2000	25/4	7	17.9 (111)	Brisbane	15.10 (100)	Subiaco Oval	19,800	Fremantle
6	2003*	27/4	5	10.13 (73)	West Coast	16.12 (108)	Subiaco Oval	41,654	West Coast
7	2004	25/4	5	18.9 (117)	Geelong	14.7 (91)	Subiaco Oval	35,021	Fremantle
8	2005	23/4	5	15.13 (103)	Carlton	11.18 (84)	Subiaco Oval	36,056	Fremantle
9	2006	22/4	4	9.5 (59)	Adelaide	9.16 (70)	Subiaco Oval	35,090	Adelaide
10	2007	29/4	5	7.16 (58)	Adelaide	8.9 (57)	Subiaco Oval	37,172	Fremantle
11	2008	25/4	6	13.10 (88)	Geelong	13.11 (89)	Subiaco Oval	38,022	Geelong
12	2009	25/4	5	18.13 (121)	Sydney	16.4 (100)	Subiaco Oval	32,884	Fremantle
13	2010	25/4	5	15.22 (112)	Richmond	11.7 (73)	Subiaco Oval	38,010	Fremantle
14	2011	25/4	5	12.13 (85)	Western Bulldogs	11.12 (78)	Subiaco Oval	37,551	Fremantle
15	2012	27/4	5	7.15 (57)	Carlton	10.5 (65)	Subiaco Oval	38,847	Carlton
16	2013	26/4	5	12.9 (81)	Richmond	12.8 (80)	Subiaco Oval	36,365	Fremantle
17	2014	25/4	6	8.13 (61)	North Melbourne	10.14 (74)	Subiaco Oval	37,624	North Melbourne
18	2015	25/4	4	11.8 (74)	Sydney	8.12 (60)	Subiaco Oval	39,009	Fremantle
19	2016	24/4	5	9.14 (68)	Carlton	10.12 (72)	Subiaco Oval	34,796	Carlton
20	2017	22/4	5	9.13 (67)	North Melbourne	9.8 (62)	Subiaco Oval	33,319	Fremantle
21	2018	21/4	5	16.12 (108)	Western Bulldogs	8.6 (54)	Perth Stadium	43,056	Fremantle
22	2019	27/4	6	13.10 (88)	Western Bulldogs	9.15 (69)	Perth Stadium	43,732	Fremantle
	2020	No match played in 2020 due to the COVID-19 pandemic							
23	2021	24/4	6	14.15 (99)	North Melbourne	6.12 (48)	Perth Stadium	0^	Fremantle
24	2022	23/4	6	14.13 (97)	Carlton	9.8 (62)	Perth Stadium	42,302	Fremantle
25	2023	21/4	6	10.9 (69)	Western Bulldogs	17.16 (118)	Perth Stadium	47,503	Western Bulldogs
26	2024	27/4	7	14.11 (95)	Western Bulldogs	10.11 (71)	Perth Stadium	45,931	Fremantle
27	2025	25/4	7	12.13 (85)	Adelaide Crows	9.13 (67)	Perth Stadium	53,048	Fremantle
28	2026	25/4	7	16.7 (103)	Carlton	13.11 (89)	Perth Stadium	54,100	Fremantle

* There was no match played in 2001 and 2002 because Fremantle played away in the Anzac Round in both of those years.

^ Match played without crowd attendance, due to COVID-19 restrictions.

Arthur Leggett Medalist

The Arthur Leggett Medal has been awarded to the player deemed best on ground in the annual Len Hall fixture since 2025.

Table of recipients
Year	Recipient	Club
2025	Andrew Brayshaw	Fremantle
2026	Shai Bolton	Fremantle
