= Rudi Frigo =

Australian rules footballer (born 1974)

Personal information
- Full name: Rudi Frigo
- Born: 31 January 1974 (age 52)
- Original team: Mayne
- Height: 195 cm (6 ft 5 in)
- Weight: 95 kg (209 lb)

Playing career^{1}
Years	Club	Games (Goals)
1994–1995	Brisbane Bears	8 (1)
- ^{1} Playing statistics correct to the end of 1995.

Rudi Frigo (born 31 January 1974) is a former Australian rules footballer who played with the Brisbane Bears in the Australian Football League (AFL).

Frigo was a key position player, occasionally called on to ruck. After the 1991 AFL season concluded, Frigo was one of eight young Queensland based players who were signed by Brisbane as "zone clearing" concession picks.

Originally from Queensland Australian Football League (QAFL) club Mayne, Frigo made his senior AFL debut midway through the 1994 AFL season, making seven appearances that year. He played just one more game in 1995 and finished his league career with a rare statistic for a Bears player; playing in more wins than losses.

Following his delisting by Brisbane, Frigo moved to Adelaide to play with South Australian National Football League (SANFL) club Woodville-West Torrens.
