= Tony Shaw (Australian rules footballer) =

Australian rules footballer, born 1960

Personal information
- Full name: Anthony Shaw
- Born: 23 July 1960 (age 66)
- Original team: Reservoir-Lakeside (NFL)
- Height: 170 cm (5 ft 7 in)
- Weight: 80 kg (176 lb)
- Position: Rover/Centre

Playing career^{1}
Years	Club	Games (Goals)
1978–1994	Collingwood	313 (157)

Representative team honours
Years	Team	Games (Goals)
	Victoria	? (?)

Coaching career^{3}
Years	Club	Games (W–L–D)
1996–1999	Collingwood	88 (30–58–0)
- ^{1} Playing statistics correct to the end of 1994.^{3} Coaching statistics correct as of 1999.

Career highlights
- AFL Premiership: 1990 (c); Norm Smith Medal: 1990; VFL/AFL Team of the Year: 1984, 1990 (Captain); Collingwood Best & Fairest: 1984, 1990; AFLPA best captain: 1990; Collingwood Captain: 1987-1993; Collingwood Team of the Century: Interchange; Collingwood Hall of Fame

Anthony Shaw (born 23 July 1960) is a former Australian rules footballer, coach and media personality who played for the Collingwood Football Club.

== Playing career ==
=== Collingwood Football Club ===
Shaw was recruited to Collingwood from Reservoir-Lakeside to make his debut in 1977 alongside brother Ray. He was a small midfielder at 170 cm who didn't have the natural ability or quality skills of others but his courage and determination made him a fine rover. He did struggle in his early years to cement a senior position in the team. Shaw played in the 1980–1981 losing Grand Final sides.

In 1984, Shaw won the Copeland Trophy as the Magpies best and fairest player for the season, as well as playing with second brother Neville. After another couple seasons of the club failing to make the finals, Shaw took over the captaincy left by Mark Williams in 1987, but the side failed in the new-look competition, finishing 12th.

In 1990, Shaw captained the club to a historic premiership, the club's first in 32 years, defeating Essendon. Shaw's 35 touches saw him earn the Norm Smith Medal as best on the ground. In the same season, Shaw won his second Copeland Trophy.

In 1991, against the Brisbane Bears, Shaw had 50 disposals, which was at the time the second most disposals recorded in a game by a single player (trailing Greg Williams' record of 53 set in 1989).

Injuries got the better of him in years to come, but he continued impressing as a centreman despite the constant struggle of getting on the park injury-free. At the end of 1993, he was considering retirement but played on, despite handing the captaincy to premiership team-mate Gavin Brown. 1994 was his last year, but he broke several records. In round nine, against North Melbourne, he played his 300th game, and nine weeks later against Footscray, he broke Gordon Coventry's club VFL/AFL games record of 306 games. Shaw's last game was played at the WACA in an elimination final which the Magpies lost by two points.

Shaw retired in a tearful farewell with playing a total of 313 VFL/AFL games and kicked a total of 157 goals for Collingwood Football Club from 1978 until 1994.

== Statistics ==
=== Playing statistics ===
Legend
G	Goals	K	Kicks	D	Disposals	T	Tackles
B	Behinds	H	Handballs	M	Marks
#	Played in that season's premiership team

Season	Team	No.	Games	Totals							Averages (per game)							Votes
Season	Team	No.	Games	G	B	K	H	D	M	T	G	B	K	H	D	M	T	Votes
1978	Collingwood	56,32	5	6	2	42	22	64	10	—N/a	1.2	0.4	8.4	4.4	12.8	2.0	—N/a	0
1979	Collingwood	22	15	8	7	227	113	340	41	—N/a	0.5	0.5	15.1	7.5	22.7	2.7	—N/a	0
1980	Collingwood	22	18	14	12	190	88	278	35	—N/a	0.8	0.7	10.6	4.9	15.4	1.9	—N/a	0
1981	Collingwood	22	25	19	18	413	227	640	70	—N/a	0.8	0.7	16.5	9.1	25.6	2.8	—N/a	6
1982	Collingwood	22	20	18	8	294	206	500	56	—N/a	0.9	0.4	14.7	10.3	25.0	2.8	—N/a	4
1983	Collingwood	22	22	14	14	299	216	515	86	—N/a	0.6	0.6	13.6	9.8	23.4	3.9	—N/a	0
1984	Collingwood	22	23	15	19	396	280	676	119	—N/a	0.7	0.8	17.2	12.2	29.4	5.2	—N/a	6
1985	Collingwood	22	22	11	10	360	240	600	114	—N/a	0.5	0.5	16.4	10.9	27.3	5.2	—N/a	10
1986	Collingwood	22	20	10	7	328	218	546	84	—N/a	0.5	0.4	16.4	10.9	27.3	4.2	—N/a	5
1987	Collingwood	22	16	3	2	221	151	372	49	38	0.2	0.1	13.8	9.4	23.3	3.1	2.4	0
1988	Collingwood	22	20	9	10	316	203	519	89	34	0.5	0.5	15.8	10.2	26.0	4.5	1.7	4
1989	Collingwood	22	14	6	7	208	141	349	56	23	0.4	0.5	14.9	10.1	24.9	4.0	1.6	5
1990^{#}	Collingwood	22	26	7	11	459	277	736	105	55	0.3	0.4	17.7	10.7	28.3	4.0	2.1	13
1991	Collingwood	22	18	8	7	316	202	518	57	35	0.4	0.4	17.6	11.2	28.8	3.2	1.9	3
1992	Collingwood	22	17	3	2	244	162	406	74	30	0.2	0.1	14.4	9.5	23.9	4.4	1.8	4
1993	Collingwood	22	12	1	3	133	119	252	36	30	0.1	0.3	11.1	9.9	21.0	3.0	2.5	0
1994	Collingwood	22	20	5	2	141	180	321	40	28	0.3	0.1	7.1	9.0	16.1	2.0	1.4	2
Career			313	157	141	4587	3045	7632	1121	273	0.5	0.5	14.7	9.7	24.4	3.6	1.9	62

== Head coaching record ==
Team	Year	Home and Away Season					Finals				
Team	Year	Won	Lost	Drew	Win %	Finish	Won	Lost	Drew	Win %	Result
COLL	1996	9	13	0	.409	11th out of 16	—	—	—	—	—
COLL	1997	10	12	0	.455	10th out of 16	—	—	—	—	—
COLL	1998	7	15	0	.318	14th out of 16	—	—	—	—	—
COLL	1999	4	18	0	.182	16th out of 16	—	—	—	—	—
		30	58	0	.341		0	0	0	.000	

== Honours and achievements ==
Team

- AFL premiership player (Collingwood): 1990 (c)

Individual

- Norm Smith Medal: 1990
- AFL Premiership Captain: 1990
- Collingwood Captain: 1987–1993
- AFLPA Best Captain Award: 1990
- 2× Copeland Trophy: 1984, 1990
- 4× State of Origin (Victoria): 1984, 1990, 1991, 1992
- Collingwood Team of the Century 1897-1996 – Interchange
- Collingwood F.C. Hall of Fame: 2004 inductee
- VFL/AFL Team of the Year: 1984, 1990 (c)

== Coaching career ==
=== Collingwood Football Club senior coach (1996–1999) ===
After Leigh Matthews was sacked as Collingwood Football Club senior coach at the end of the 1995 season, Shaw would be appointed the senior coach of Collingwood Football Club for the 1996 season, only two seasons after retirement. A leader on the field, Shaw was unsuccessful off the field as a coach. In the 1996 season, he would guide Collingwood to finish in 11th place with nine wins and thirteen losses, and his best effort came in the 1997 season when the club finished 10th with ten wins and twelve losses. In the 1998 season, Collingwood under Shaw finished in 14th place with seven wins and fifteen losses. Shaw then coached the Pies to finish 16th, which is the last position on the ladder to the club's second wooden spoon in the 1999 season with four wins and eighteen losses, earning the accolade of being a premiership captain to coach a wooden spoon side. After that, Shaw resigned as Collingwood Football Club senior coach. Shaw was then replaced by Mick Malthouse as Collingwood Football Club senior coach.

Shaw coached Collingwood Football Club from 1996 until 1999 to a total of 88 games with 30 wins and 58 losses to a winning percentage of 34 percent.

== Post-football ==
Shaw became a media commentator after his coaching role, commentating on the radio for 3AW Football before joining the Fox Footy Channel as a commentator/special comments for several seasons.

In 1991, Shaw was appointed Moomba Monarch (popularly called King of Moomba).

His son, Brayden, was drafted to Collingwood in 2003, but failed to play an AFL senior game before being delisted in 2005 and moving to play for Port Melbourne in the VFL.

In March 2006, Shaw returned to media focus when he publicly criticised the AFL for the consistent introduction of new rules.

Shaw was selected to present the Norm Smith Medal to the best player in the 2008 AFL Grand Final, which was Luke Hodge from Hawthorn.

== Racism ==
In 1991 Shaw told journalist Caroline Wilson of The Sunday Age that "I'd make a racist comment every week if I thought it would help win the game. If I think I can say something to upset someone, then I'll say it. I couldn't give a stuff about their race, religion or creed. If they react, you know you've got 'em". However, in 2021, following an independent review of the Collingwood Football Club which found evidence of systemic racism, he denied that the club was racist, stating "I played there for 21 years and coached over that period of time … I never saw anything that meant that this whole club was racist".

''I said it,'' Shaw said in a follow-up 2013 interview with The Age after 22 years of publicly avoiding the matter. ''I was naive and I was wrong. I had this view that what goes on the field, stays on the field. I erred and I've got to wear it.''
