= James Manson (Australian footballer) =

Australian rules footballer

Personal information
- Born: 2 November 1966 (age 60); Tasmania
- Original team: North Hobart (TANFL)

Playing career^{1}
Years	Club	Games (Goals)
1985–1992	Collingwood	120 (106)
1993–1995	Fitzroy	47 (20)
Total		167 (126)
- ^{1} Playing statistics correct to the end of 1995.

Career highlights
- Collingwood Premiership player: 1990

James Manson (born 2 November 1966) is a former Australian rules footballer who played in the VFL/AFL for Collingwood and Fitzroy.

From North Hobart Football Club in Tasmania, Manson provided some great assets to Collingwood Magpies. Manson stood at 194 cm and was solidly built (108 kg) with a great overhead mark. He had a very awkward kicking style, with the action very different from most footballers, as he overlooked the ball with a cramped style as he dropped it on the boot. He kicked over 100 goals with the Magpies. Manson was part of the 1990 premiership side, and had a key role in the finals series. Manson played as a ruckman who moved forward, or the other way around. With young ruckman Damian Monkhorst also at Victoria Park, Manson struggled to maintain his position in the team later in his career as 'Monkey' developed each season. Manson was then traded to Fitzroy where he played for three seasons before retiring.

Manson's father Jim played 210 games for Glenorchy Football Club. He attended high school at Dominic College and was inducted into their Hall of Achievement
