= Doug Barwick =

Australian rules footballer, born 1962

Personal information
- Born: 6 February 1962 (age 64)
- Original team: East Launceston (NTFA)
- Debut: Round 1, 1984, Fitzroy vs. Geelong, at Kardinia Park
- Height: 176 cm (5 ft 9 in)
- Weight: 85 kg (187 lb)

Playing career^{1}
Years	Club	Games (Goals)
1984–1987	Fitzroy	76 (128)
1988–1991	Collingwood	71 (90)
Total		147 (218)
- ^{1} Playing statistics correct to the end of 1991.

Career highlights
- Collingwood Premiership 1990

Doug Barwick (born 6 February 1962) is a former Australian rules footballer who represented Fitzroy and Collingwood in the Australian Football League.

Recruited from Northern Tasmanian Football Association (NTFA) club East Launceston, where he won the club's Best and Fairest in 1983, Barwick made his debut in Round 1 of the 1984 VFL season against Geelong at Kardinia Park. A strong mark and a long kick for his size, Barwick was a tough half-forward who was a handy goalkicker. He played 76 games for Fitzroy before moving to Collingwood in 1988. Barwick played in the Magpies' 1990 drought-breaking premiership, kicking two goals. He retired in 1991 at the age of 29, with 147 games and 217 goals to his name, along with a premiership medallion. He also represented Victoria in 1987 and Tasmania in 1990 and 1991.

He was named a life member of the Collingwood in 2010.
