= Peter Daicos =

Australian rules footballer, born 1961

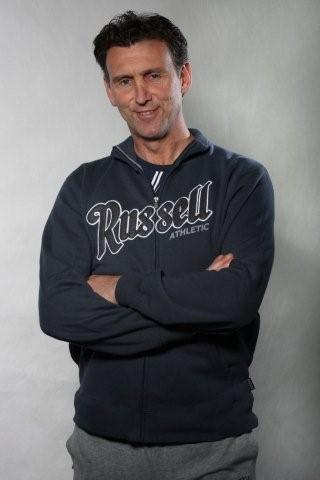
- Peter Daicos in 2009

Personal information
- Nicknames: Macedonian Marvel, Daicos, The Magician
- Born: 20 September 1961 (age 65); Fitzroy, Victoria, Australia
- Original team: Preston RSL (Vic)
- Debut: Round 4, 1979, Collingwood vs. St Kilda, at Victoria Park
- Height: 184 cm (6 ft 0 in)
- Weight: 90 kg (198 lb)

Playing career^{1}
Years	Club	Games (Goals)
1979–1993	Collingwood	250 (549)

Representative team honours
Years	Team	Games (Goals)
	Victoria	5 (12)
- ^{1} Playing statistics correct to the end of 1993.

Career highlights
- AFL Premiership: 1990; 3x VFL/AFL Team of the Year 1982, 1988, 1990; 2x Collingwood Best & Fairest: 1982, 1988; 5x Collingwood leading goalkicker: 1981–1982, 1990–1992; Goal of the Year: 1991; Australian Football Hall of Fame; Collingwood Team of the Century; Greek Team of the Century

Peter Daicos (born 20 September 1961) is a former professional Australian rules footballer who played his entire 250-game career with the Collingwood Football Club in the VFL/AFL.

Daicos is considered one of Collingwood's greatest ever players thanks to his brilliant 549-goal, 15-year career that earned him entry into the Australian Football Hall of Fame. His honours include the 1990 AFL premiership with Collingwood, and the 1991 Goal of the Year. He also represented his home state of Victoria a total of five times.

Daicos was named in Collingwood's Team of the Century in the forward pocket, led the club's goalkicking for five seasons, and won the best-and-fairest award twice.

== Football career ==
Daicos debuted with the Collingwood Football Club in Round 4, 1979, against St Kilda, in what was, at the time, the largest-winning margin in VFL/AFL history (179 points). He went on to play 250 games (for 549 goals) with the Magpies until his retirement in 1993, and he won a premiership with them in 1990; he kicked Collingwood's first goal in that match.

In the 1990 season, Daicos scored 97 goals playing mostly from the forward pocket, a feat made all the more remarkable because he was considerably shorter than many full-forwards of the era and was not playing in the traditional position of a spearhead full-forward. His skills in scoring from seemingly impossible angles, as well as his ability to get rid of defenders, led pundits to start naming him 'The Magician'.

In fact, one of his goals, which drew the 1990 Qualifying Final, became the subject of a Toyota Memorable Moments advertisement, first screened in 2005.

== Post-playing career ==
In 2005, Daicos became coach at local club Greythorn Falcons, and in 2006 coached them to an 80-point win in the Grand Final.

In 2007, Daicos launched SportzStats, a hybrid online/offline sports statistics tracking and diary system for junior players in various sports.

In 2010, Daicos resumed commentating duties with the AFL Live radio team.

== Personal life ==
In 1961, Peter Daicos was born in the Melbourne suburb of Fitzroy. His parents were Slavic speakers of Greek Macedonia from the village of Vevi, and arrived as immigrants to Australia during the 1950s.

Daicos is part of the Macedonian Australian community. In 1991 the magazine Makedonija, published by the Macedonian emigrant organisation Matica na iselenicite od Makedonija, wrote that he took every opportunity to highlight his Macedonian origin. As a footballer, Daicos was known as the 'Macedonian Marvel'.

His eldest son, Josh, was drafted to Collingwood with pick 57 in the 2016 national draft under the father–son rule. Another son, Nick, was also recruited through the father–son rule by Collingwood, selected with pick 4 in the 2021 national draft after the Gold Coast Suns’ bid was matched by the Magpies. Both Daicos brothers played for the Oakleigh Chargers in the TAC Cup in their draft years, and are AFL premiers, having won with Collingwood in 2023.

In 2024, Daicos was a celebrity contestant on the tenth season of I'm a Celebrity...Get Me Out of Here! and became a weekly football commentator for the Seven Network's morning Sunrise show.

== Legacy ==
In 1999, Daicos was inducted into the Australian Football Hall of Fame. He was selected vice-captain and full-forward in the honorary AFL Greek Team of the Century in 2004 and also as a member of the Collingwood Team of the Century.

Nowadays, his name is regularly used by journalists, commentators, and Australian football fans as an adjective to describe a difficult goal scored from the boundary in play, especially one that is dribbled along the ground in a controlled manner; such feats may be referred to as a 'Daicos-style goal'.

Daicos' son Josh was awarded Goal of the Year in 2020 for his single-handed effort from the boundary in round 10 to seal a victory against Sydney in a style reminiscent of the elder Daicos' snap goals.

As of the end of the 2023 AFL season, Daicos still holds the ground record for most goals kicked in a single game at Carrara Stadium on the Gold Coast when he kicked 13 majors against the Brisbane Bears in round 20, 1991.

== See also ==
- List of VFL/AFL players by ethnicity
