= Michael Gayfer =

Australian rules footballer (born 1965)

Personal information
- Nickname: Mick
- Born: 17 August 1965 (age 61)
- Original team: Corowa-Rutherglen (OMFNL): Caulfield (VFA)
- Height: 186 cm (6 ft 1 in)
- Weight: 90 kg (198 lb)
- Position: Defender

Playing career^{1}
Years	Club	Games (Goals)
1986–1993	Collingwood	142 (1)
- ^{1} Playing statistics correct to the end of 1993.

Career highlights
- AFL premiership player: 1990

Michael "Mick" Gayfer (born 17 August 1965) is a former Australian rules footballer who played for Collingwood in the Australian Football League (AFL).

== Career ==
Gayfer played for Collingwood, primarily as a defender, debuting in Round 1 of the 1986 season, and playing a total of 142 games at the level, concluding his career at the end of the 1993 season. On 11 March 2015, Gayfer was inducted into Collingwood's Hall of Fame alongside the rest of the 1990 premiership team.

== Personal life ==
Gayfer's nephew, Sam, a key forward from Vic Metro, is a draft prospect at the upcoming 2026 AFL national draft.

== Honours and achievements ==
=== Team ===
- AFL premiership player (Collingwood): 1990
