= Graham Wright =

Personal information
- Born: 6 June 1968 (age 58)
- Original team: East Devonport
- Draft: No. 3, 1987 national draft

Playing career^{1}
Years	Club	Games (Goals)
1988–1998	Collingwood	201 (107)
- ^{1} Playing statistics correct to the end of 1998.

Career highlights
- Harry Collier Trophy 1988; 2nd Brownlow Medal 1990; 3rd best and fairest 1990 (eq); Collingwood premiership side 1990

Graham Wright (born 6 June 1968) is an Australian rules football administrator and former player. Wright played for Collingwood in the Australian Football League, and is the current CEO of the Carlton Football Club.

== Playing career ==
=== Collingwood ===
Wright was selected by Collingwood in the 1987 National draft with their first round pick (No. 3 overall) as a quick wingman, having shown great courage for Tasmanian side East Devonport. Wright made his debut in 1988. In 1990, Wright finished 2nd in the Brownlow Medal to Tony Liberatore by one vote, and finished equal 3rd in the Copeland Trophy. Wright was also a valuable member of the 1990 premiership side. He represented Tasmania, Victoria and the Allies in interstate football during his career.

A shock came to coach Leigh Matthews and players at the end of 1991 when Wright announced he wanted to return to Tasmania to play football, but was talked out of it by Matthews. In 1993 he was a victim of a disease which threatened his playing career, but he recovered in the pre-season to continue playing his damaging football on the wing. Consistent football followed in the mid-1990s before he suffered a knee injury in 1996 against Richmond which would require a knee reconstruction. Following the season-ending injury, his main asset of pace was severely affected, and he would play out his career in defence where his courage gave him an edge. Wright played his 200th game against Carlton in 1998, before retiring from the AFL at the end of the 1998 season.

Wright played two further seasons of senior football for Burnie in the Tasmanian Statewide League before retiring from playing. He was inducted into the Tasmanian Football Hall of Fame.

Wright played a total of 201 games and kicked 107 goals for Collingwood from 1988 until 1998 and was a member of the Collingwood 1990 premiership side.

== Administrator ==
In his first years after retirement, Wright served suburban and state level coaching roles at North Ringwood (2002–2003) and Springvale (2004).

Brisbane Lions

With an MBA in Sports Management,in 2004, Wright took on his first AFL administrative role as recruiter for the Brisbane Lions.

Hawthorn

He shifted to Hawthorn in the same role in 2007, becoming the recruiting and list manager at Hawthorn in June 2011. He served a key role in the reconstruction of Hawthorn's team during these years, responsible for bringing Shaun Burgoyne, David Hale, Josh Gibson, Jack Gunston, Jonathan Simpkin and Brian Lake to the club, which formed part of the core of Hawthorn's three consecutive premierships from 2013 to 2015. Wright was promoted to Head of Football at Hawthorn in 2018. Wright departed Hawthorn in January 2021.

Collingwood

In 2021, he returned to Collingwood as General Manager of Football, overseeing the club's 2023 premiership in that position. Wright departed Collingwood on 18 August 2024.

Carlton

In 2025, he joined Carlton as Deputy CEO, under a succession plan which will see him take over as CEO from Brian Cook from 2026. On 15 August 2025, Wright officially became CEO of Carlton.
