= Kieran Sporn =

Australian rules footballer

Personal information
- Born: 28 August 1966 (age 60)
- Original team: West Adelaide (SANFL)
- Draft: No. 22, 1986 national draft
- Debut: 1989, Essendon vs. West Coast, at WACA Ground
- Height: 186 cm (6 ft 1 in)
- Weight: 81 kg (179 lb)

Playing career^{1}
Years	Club	Games (Goals)
1989–93	Essendon	72 (65)
1994	Fitzroy	12 (6)
Total		84 (71)
- ^{1} Playing statistics correct to the end of 1994.

Career highlights
- Sam Suckling Medal 1986 (West Adelaide best first year player); Trabilsie Medal 1987

Kieran Sporn (born 28 August 1966) is a former Australian rules footballer who played with Essendon and Fitzroy in the Australian Football League (AFL) from 1989-94.

== Career ==
Originally from South Australia where he played for South Australian National Football League (SANFL) club West Adelaide, winning the club's Sam Suckling Medal as the best first year player in 1986, and the club Best & Fairest in 1987.

Sporn moved to Melbourne in 1989 to play for VFL team Essendon. He played 19 consecutive games during his debut season before a knee injury ending the streak. He played five seasons for Essendon, then one season for Fitzroy in 1994, before retiring.

== Personal ==
Sporn's younger sister is Olympic basketballer Rachael Sporn.
