= Gavin Crosisca =

Australian rules footballer, born 1968

Personal information
- Born: 15 September 1968 (age 58); Brisbane, Queensland
- Original team: Western Districts
- Debut: Round 1, 1987 vs. Sydney Swans, at Victoria Park
- Height: 188 cm (6 ft 2 in)
- Weight: 90 kg (198 lb)

Playing career^{1}
Years	Club	Games (Goals)
1987–2000	Collingwood	246 (64)

Representative team honours
Years	Team	Games (Goals)
1988–1991	Queensland	2
1990	Victoria	1
1995–1996	Allies	2
- ^{1} Playing statistics correct to the end of 2000.

Career highlights
- Collingwood premiership player 1990; Wrecker Award 1990, 1995, 1997; State of Origin appearances

Gavin Crosisca (born 15 September 1968 in Brisbane, Queensland) is a former Australian rules footballer in the VFL/AFL.

Debuting in the VFL 1987 with the Collingwood Football Club, Crosisca was recruited from Western Districts Australian Football Club in Queensland after having played his junior football for the Moorooka Roosters AFC. He played in the 1990 premiership side with the Magpies, and played State of Origin football for three teams: Queensland, Victoria and Allies. Crosisca was just the third Queensland born footballer to play 200 games. He retired from the game in 2000.

Following his retirement from AFL football, Crosisca has held a number of coaching positions. In 2001 and 2002, he was an assistant coach at the Kangaroos under Denis Pagan, before shifting to Hawthorn in 2003. From 2005 until 2006, Crosisca was the head coach of the North Ballarat Roosters in the Victorian Football League. By 2007 Crosisca was again under Pagan as an assistant at Carlton however this stint was to be his last in the AFL ranks.

In September 2009 Crosisca signed on to be senior coach of the Heidelberg Football Club in Melbourne's Northern Football League for the 2010 season. In May 2011 Crosisca resigned from his position as senior coach at Heidelberg for personal reasons.

In 2012, Crosisca admitted to the public that he was addicted to recreational drugs like alcohol, marijuana and amphetamines throughout his VFL/AFL career and afterward.
