= Peter Somerville =

Australian rules footballer

Personal information
- Born: 8 July 1968 (age 58)
- Original team: Moe
- Height: 195 cm (6 ft 5 in)
- Weight: 98 kg (216 lb)

Playing career^{1}
Years	Club	Games (Goals)
1988–1999	Essendon	160 (89)
- ^{1} Playing statistics correct to the end of 1999.

Career highlights
- AFL premiership player: 1993

Peter Somerville (born 8 July 1968) is a former Australian rules footballer who played 160 games for Essendon in the AFL.

A ruckman, and son of John Somerville, he shared rucking duties with Paul Salmon for much of his career. He was a premiership player with Essendon and represented Victoria in 1991 and was well known for his amazing high leaping marks.

After a successful career spanning over a decade, Somerville owned and operated his own plumbing business until 2002. He then ventured to the Sunshine Coast in Queensland to teach plumbing at TAFE.

== Statistics ==
Legend
G	Goals	K	Kicks	D	Disposals	T	Tackles
B	Behinds	H	Handballs	M	Marks	H/O	Hit-outs

Season	Team	No.	Games	Totals								Averages (per game)								Votes
Season	Team	No.	Games	G	B	K	H	D	M	T	H/O	G	B	K	H	D	M	T	H/O	Votes
1988	Essendon	42	4	2	3	31	10	41	23	4	35	0.5	0.8	7.8	2.5	10.3	5.8	1.0	8.8	3
1989	Essendon	19	3	2	2	24	11	35	15	3	16	0.7	0.7	8.0	3.7	11.7	5.0	1.0	5.3	0
1990	Essendon	19	4	5	1	21	12	33	15	4	16	1.3	0.3	5.3	3.0	8.3	3.8	1.0	4.0	0
1991	Essendon	19	17	14	12	109	59	168	85	8	52	0.8	0.7	6.4	3.5	9.9	5.0	0.5	3.1	0
1992	Essendon	19	20	21	16	169	71	240	114	11	145	1.1	0.8	8.5	3.6	12.0	5.7	0.6	7.3	5
1993†	Essendon	19	18	13	14	116	81	197	91	14	155	0.7	0.8	6.4	4.5	10.9	5.1	0.8	8.6	0
1994	Essendon	19	10	6	1	57	39	96	33	6	75	0.6	0.1	5.7	3.9	9.6	3.3	0.6	7.5	0
1995	Essendon	19	24	18	7	177	140	317	128	17	319	0.8	0.3	7.4	5.8	13.2	5.3	0.7	13.3	12
1996	Essendon	19	21	5	5	110	100	210	73	10	289	0.2	0.2	5.2	4.8	10.0	3.5	0.5	13.8	3
1997	Essendon	19	13	1	0	76	46	122	52	5	137	0.1	0.0	5.8	3.5	9.4	4.0	0.4	10.5	1
1998	Essendon	19	12	0	2	64	37	101	34	8	212	0.0	0.2	5.3	3.1	8.4	2.8	0.7	17.7	0
1999	Essendon	19	14	2	0	65	44	109	37	10	239	0.1	0.0	4.6	3.1	7.8	2.6	0.7	17.1	0
Career			160	89	63	1019	650	1669	700	100	1690	0.6	0.4	6.4	4.1	10.4	4.4	0.6	10.6	24
