= Michael Christian (footballer) =

Australian rules footballer, born 1964

Personal information
- Full name: Michael Barry Christian
- Born: 21 August 1964 (age 62); Australia
- Debut: Round 1, 1987, Collingwood vs. Sydney Swans, at Victoria Park
- Height: 193 cm (6 ft 4 in)
- Weight: 98 kg (216 lb)

Playing career^{1}
Years	Club	Games (Goals)
1981–1986	East Perth	82 (32)
1987–1995	Collingwood	131 (23)
Total		213 (55)
- ^{1} Playing statistics correct to the end of 1995.

Career highlights
- Collingwood premiership player 1990

Michael Barry Christian (born 21 August 1964) is a former Australian rules footballer and media personality from Busselton, Western Australia who played for East Perth in the West Australian Football League (WAFL) and Collingwood in the Victorian Football League/Australian Football League (VFL/AFL).

Christian played 82 games for East Perth in the WAFL from 1981 to 1986 and then crossed to Collingwood to play out his football career. He played at centre half-back for the majority of his career, but was also used sparingly as a forward. Christian was a member of Collingwood's 1990 premiership side and represented the West Australian team on three occasions.

After retiring, Christian became a football commentator and has commentated on radio for Triple M, Geelong station K-Rock (3GL) and 3AW, as well as for Network Ten. He hosted the breakfast program, Prime Time Sports Interactive, on Sport 927 with Angela Pippos and The Fifth Quarter, a post-match show following Saturday night AFL games, between 2004 and 2007, with Andrew Maher and from 2008 to 2011, with rotating expert commentators Michael Voss, Malcolm Blight or Luke Darcy.

Christian also commentated on weightlifting events at the 2010 Commonwealth Games.

He compered The Final Siren, a Sunday night football review show, in 2011.

Under reformed procedures introduced by the AFL, Christian was appointed Match Review Officer, the AFL's sole adjudicator for the Match Review Panel, in 2017.
