= Darren Millane =

Australian rules footballer

- Millane playing for Collingwood in 1988

Personal information
- Full name: Darren Millane
- Nickname: Pants
- Born: 9 August 1965; Dandenong, Victoria
- Died: 7 October 1991 (aged 26); Albert Park, Victoria
- Original team: Dandenong (VFA)/Noble Park
- Height: 187 cm (6 ft 2 in)
- Weight: 94 kg (207 lb)
- Position: Wing

Playing career^{1}
Years	Club	Games (Goals)
1982–1984	Dandenong	11 (9)
1984–1991	Collingwood	147 (78)
Total		158 (87)
- ^{1} Playing statistics correct to the end of 1991.

Career highlights
- AFL Premiership player: (1990); Copeland Trophy: (1987); AFLPA MVP: (1990); Collingwood Team of the Century (wing)

Darren Millane (9 August 1965 – 7 October 1991) was an Australian rules footballer who played for the Collingwood Football Club in the Australian Football League (AFL).

Millane died in a car accident at the age of 26, only a year after starring in the Magpies' drought-breaking premiership.

== Early life ==
Darren Millane was one of three sons born to Robert Joseph Millane and his wife Denise. His brothers, John and Sean, also played football for Dandenong.

He grew up in the suburb of Noble Park and attended Coomoora Secondary and Chandler High (both now part of Keysborough Secondary College).

== Football career ==
Millane debuted for Dandenong in the VFA in 1982. Millane was considered by both Sydney and St Kilda for a spot on their club list. Yet it was Hawthorn that won the chance, with Millane initially training at Glenferrie Oval with the Hawks, but did not like the atmosphere and went back to captain Dandenong in the Victorian Football Association. Collingwood snapped him up and Millane liked what he saw, and his football career came along nicely, debuting in 1984, aged 19.

In 1987, Millane won the best-and-fairest award. He found his place on the wing and was a footballer known for his toughness and attitude towards the game. He was most likely the recipient on the end of the kick-outs because of his strength. Although his skills were occasionally poor, at his best he found and used the football well, becoming a favourite to fans at Victoria Park.

In 1990, the premiership-drought-breaking year for the Magpies, Millane was at his peak. He won the AFL Players Association MVP Award, now known as the Leigh Matthews Trophy; was selected in the AFL Team of the Year for the first time; and came second in Collingwood's best and fairest; but it was his finals campaign that was recognised. He broke his thumb just before the series, but continued to play with painkillers during the campaign. In the 1990 Grand Final, against Essendon, he had 24 touches and ended up throwing the ball up in the air as the siren went at 5:11 pm to end Collingwood's 32-year drought on 6 October.

=== Career highlights ===
- Collingwood best and fairest 1987
- Collingwood runner-up best and fairest 1990
- AFL Team of the Year 1990
- Leigh Matthews Trophy 1990
- Collingwood premiership side 1990
- Collingwood Team of the Century member

== Death ==
On 7 October 1991, Millane was killed in a car crash while intoxicated. In the early morning of the day, he was driving on Queens Road, near Albert Park Lake, before he clipped a semi-trailer and rolled his car, being killed instantly. The autopsy revealed his blood alcohol content was 0.322 — almost six-and-a-half times the legal driving limit of 0.05. He was on his way to his Noble Park home, and that day was set to join 19 other members of the 1990 premiership side. The reunion did not go ahead, as players, officials and supporters went instead to mourn Millane's death at Victoria Park.

Millane's funeral was held at the Dandenong Town Hall, where more than 5000 people attended, while the large crowd outside heard the service on a loudspeaker. Millane's guernsey with No. 42 on it was laid on the coffin, while the 1990 flag hung in the background at half-mast. Following the funeral the No. 42 guernsey was retired from the club. In 2011, there were discussions to bring back the No. 42 guernsey to commemorate the 20th anniversary of Millane's death. However, it was decided that the No. 42 guernsey would remain retired.

From 2027, Collingwood will bring the No. 42 guernsey out of retirement for the first time since his death, with the club set to award it to its first selection in each year's draft.
