= Craig Starcevich =

Australian rules footballer

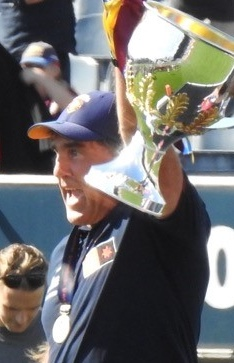
- Starcevich holding the AFLW premiership cup in 2023

Personal information
- Born: 16 May 1967 (age 59)
- Original team: East Perth (WAFL)
- Debut: Round 1, 1987, Collingwood vs. Sydney Swans, at Victoria Park

Club information
- Current club: Brisbane Lions (women's coach)

Playing career^{1}
Years	Club	Games (Goals)
1985-1986	East Perth	37 (41)
1987–1993	Collingwood	124 (162)
1994–1995	Brisbane Bears	20 (16)
Total		177 (219)

Coaching career^{3}
Years	Club	Games (W–L–D)
2017–	Brisbane (W)	78 (54–23–1)
- ^{1} Playing statistics correct to the end of 1995.^{3} Coaching statistics correct as of the end of the 2023 season.

Career highlights
- AFL premiership player: 1990; Harry Collier Trophy: 1987; AFL Women's premiership coach: 2021, 2023

Craig Starcevich (born 16 May 1967) is a former Australian rules footballer and current senior coach. Starcevich played for Collingwood and the Brisbane Bears in the Australian Football League (AFL), known as the Victorian Football League (VFL) prior to 1990. He is the current senior coach of Brisbane in the AFL Women's (AFLW), having led the team since its inception. Starcevich was the first person to win both an AFL and an AFLW premiership, having won the latter as coach.

== Playing career ==
Starcevich was recruited from East Perth, for whom he played 37 games for after he won the 1986 F. D. Book Medal for being judged their best and fairest player. On the back of this, Starcevich was recruited to Collingwood in the VFL.

Starcevich made his VFL debut in 1987. He played the role of a key-position player, coming off the bench in Collingwood's 1990 premiership side to be a solid contributor during the grand final. He played 124 games and kicked 162 goals for Collingwood before moving to the Brisbane Bears at the end of 1993 as part of the trade that saw Nathan Buckley go to Collingwood. He played 20 games and kicked 16 goals for the Bears before retiring at the end of 1995.

== Coaching career ==
=== Fitness coaching ===
Following his retirement from AFL football as a player, Starcevich became one of the most prominent fitness trainers in the AFL.

In 2006, he was recruited as part of the St Kilda Football Club's head of training services in an attempt to turn around the club's large injury list in the 2005 season. During the 2006 pre-season, Starcevich adopted a controversial policy whereby players were banned from wearing thongs, citing the fact that they could increase the risk of injuries to feet. He left the Saints before the 2007 season, citing "family reasons".

In March 2007, Starcevich joined A-League team Queensland Roar as strength and conditioning coach.

=== Senior coaching ===
In June 2016, Starcevich was appointed head coach of the Brisbane Lions women's team. Starcevich guided the Lions to the minor premiership in the inaugural season of AFL Women's in 2017. By finishing first, the Lions qualified for the 2017 AFL Women's Grand Final. The team lost to the Adelaide Crows in the decider. In the league's second season, the Lions once again lost the Grand Final by six points under Starcevich, in a game which ended 27–21 in favour of the Western Bulldogs.

As of 2026 Starcevich has coached Brisbane to two premierships from seven grand final appearances and has been named the AFLW Senior Coach of the Year three times.

== Personal life ==
Starcevich's son Jackson played for Collingwood in the VFL, and nephew Brandon currently plays for West Coast in the AFL.

== Coaching statistics ==
Statistics are correct to the end of the 2023 season

Legend
W	Wins	L	Losses	D	Draws	W%	Winning percentage	LP	Ladder position	LT	League teams

Season	Team	Games	W	L	D	W %	LP	LT
2017	Brisbane	8	6	1	1	75.00%	1	8
2018	Brisbane	8	4	4	0	50.00%	2	8
2019	Brisbane	7	2	5	0	28.57%	4^{c}/9^{o} (Note: In 2019 and 2020, the AFLW was split into two conferences. ^{c} denotes the statistic for Brisbane's conference, while ^{o} denotes the statistic if the conferences were combined.)	5^{c}/10^{o}
2020	Brisbane	6	3	3	0	50.00%	3^{c}/7^{o}	7^{c}/14^{o}
2021^{#}	Brisbane	11	9	2	0	81.82%	2	14
2022 (S6)	Brisbane	12	9	3	0	75.00%	3	14
2022 (S7)	Brisbane	13	11	2	0	84.62%	1	18
2023^{#}	Brisbane	13	10	3	0	76.92%	4	18
Career totals		78	54	23	1	69.23%		
