= Scott Russell (footballer) =

Australian rules footballer

Personal information
- Born: 7 May 1970 (age 56)
- Original team: Sturt (SANFL)
- Draft: No. 39, 1988 national draft
- Debut: Round 1, 1990, Collingwood vs. West Coast, at Subiaco
- Height: 180 cm (5 ft 11 in)
- Weight: 80 kg (176 lb)

Playing career^{1}
Years	Club	Games (Goals)
1990–1998	Collingwood	182 (107)
1999	Sydney	16 (8)
Total		198 (115)
- ^{1} Playing statistics correct to the end of 1999.

Career highlights
- AFL premiership player: 1990; AFL ANZAC Medal: 1996; Harry Collier Trophy: 1990

Scott Russell (born 7 May 1970) is a former Australian rules footballer who played for Collingwood and Sydney in the Australian Football League. He played all possible 26 games in his debut season in 1990, winning a premiership medallion at the end of the year.

== Career ==
Russell began his Australian Football League (AFL) career with Collingwood Football Club in 1990 after being recruited from South Australian National Football League (SANFL) club Sturt. He made an immediate impact, playing all 26 games in his debut season and contributing significantly to Collingwood's premiership victory that year. His outstanding performance earned him the Harry Collier Trophy, awarded to the club's best first-year player.

Throughout his nine seasons with Collingwood, Russell was a consistent and reliable midfielder, known for his pace, class, and ability to win possessions. He played a total of 182 games and scored 107 goals for the club. His consistency was evident as he finished third in the club's best and fairest count in 1990, 1991, 1992, and 1996.

Russell's durability was notable, with an almost injury-free run apart from a bout of glandular fever in 1994. He was a smooth runner with a slightly hunched kicking style, constantly positioning himself to get the ball. His dependability and hard work in the packs were pillars of strength during a challenging period for Collingwood, which featured in only two finals in the 11 years following the 1990 triumph.

In addition to his club achievements, Russell represented South Australia eight times in State of Origin football. After leaving Collingwood at the end of the 1998 season, he joined the Sydney Swans, playing 16 games in 1999 before injuries led to his retirement in 2000.

In 2011, Russell was retrospectively awarded the 1996 ANZAC Day Medal for his best-on-ground performance against Essendon, where he amassed 26 disposals and a goal.
