= David Grenvold =

Australian rules footballer

Personal information
- Born: 6 March 1966 (age 60)
- Original team: Glenelg (SANFL)
- Draft: No. 45, 1987 national draft
- Height: 180 cm (5 ft 11 in)
- Weight: 88 kg (194 lb)

Playing career^{1}
| Years | Club | Games (Goals) |
| 1984–1988, 1998.1999 | Glenelg | 101 (20) |
| 1989–1996 | Essendon | 112 (18) |
| Total | | 213 (38) |
- ^{1} Playing statistics correct to the end of 1996.

Career highlights
- AFL premiership player: 1993

David Grenvold (born 6 March 1966) is a former Australian rules footballer who played with Essendon in the Australian Football League (AFL).

== Early life and junior football ==
Grenvold was born in Bordertown, South Australia on 6 March 1966 and raised there. He grew up supporting VFL club North Melbourne Football Club. He debuted for Glenelg in 1984 as an 18-year-old, he would continue to play on with Glenelg as a solid defender until 1988, missing out on the 1985 and 86 premiership teams. At age 21 he was drafted to Essendon in the 1987 VFL draft at pick 45.

== VFL Career ==
He played 12 games in his debut season and the following year played every game, except for a two-week suspension however in 1991 he injured his knee in a practice game at Moorabbin in 1991 and didn't play a game that season. Grenvold would come back in 1992 with 11 games then played every game in 1993 including the 1993 Grand Final win over Carlton. He would play 18 games in 1994 and 23 games in 1995 but in 1996 he would only manage 1 game due to injury after which Grenvold retired from the AFL. Grenvold played in the backline for Essendon where he was a consistent, rugged contributor he appeared 112 times for the club, including their 1993 Grand Final win. He also represented South Australia in 1993.

== Post-VFL ==
Grenvold came back to Glenelg in 1997, playing until 1999. He would finish with 101 games and 20 goals for the Bays. After football Grenvold held roles at the Adelaide Football Club and Greater Western Sydney. Grenvold was Chief Executive Officer of West Adelaide Football Club from 2017 to 2019. He is currently CEO of RSL SA/NT.

== Statistics ==
Legend
| G | Goals | K | Kicks | D | Disposals | T | Tackles |
| B | Behinds | H | Handballs | M | Marks |

| Season | Team | No. | Games | Totals | | | | | | | Averages (per game) | | | | | | | Votes |
| Season | Team | No. | Games | G | B | K | H | D | M | T | G | B | K | H | D | M | T | Votes |
|---|---|---|---|---|---|---|---|---|---|---|---|---|---|---|---|---|---|---|
| 1989 | Essendon | 29 | 12 | 2 | 2 | 82 | 69 | 151 | 25 | 14 | 0.2 | 0.2 | 6.8 | 5.8 | 12.6 | 2.1 | 1.2 | 0 |
| 1990 | Essendon | 29 | 23 | 3 | 6 | 210 | 163 | 373 | 64 | 31 | 0.1 | 0.3 | 9.1 | 7.1 | 16.2 | 2.8 | 1.3 | 6 |
| 1991 | Essendon | 29 | 0 | — | — | — | — | — | — | — | — | — | — | — | — | — | — | — |
| 1992 | Essendon | 29 | 11 | 2 | 4 | 70 | 61 | 131 | 19 | 9 | 0.2 | 0.4 | 6.4 | 5.5 | 11.9 | 1.7 | 0.8 | 0 |
| 1993† | Essendon | 29 | 24 | 7 | 4 | 214 | 142 | 356 | 69 | 28 | 0.3 | 0.2 | 8.9 | 5.9 | 14.8 | 2.9 | 1.2 | 0 |
| 1994 | Essendon | 29 | 18 | 1 | 2 | 120 | 78 | 198 | 36 | 15 | 0.1 | 0.1 | 6.7 | 4.3 | 11.0 | 2.0 | 0.8 | 0 |
| 1995 | Essendon | 29 | 23 | 3 | 2 | 143 | 85 | 228 | 52 | 15 | 0.1 | 0.1 | 6.2 | 3.7 | 9.9 | 2.3 | 0.7 | 0 |
| 1996 | Essendon | 29 | 1 | 0 | 0 | 6 | 5 | 11 | 2 | 0 | 0.0 | 0.0 | 6.0 | 5.0 | 11.0 | 2.0 | 0.0 | 0 |
| Career | | | 112 | 18 | 20 | 845 | 603 | 1448 | 267 | 112 | 0.2 | 0.2 | 7.5 | 5.4 | 12.9 | 2.4 | 1.0 | 6 |
