= Damian Monkhorst =

Australian rules footballer (born 1969)

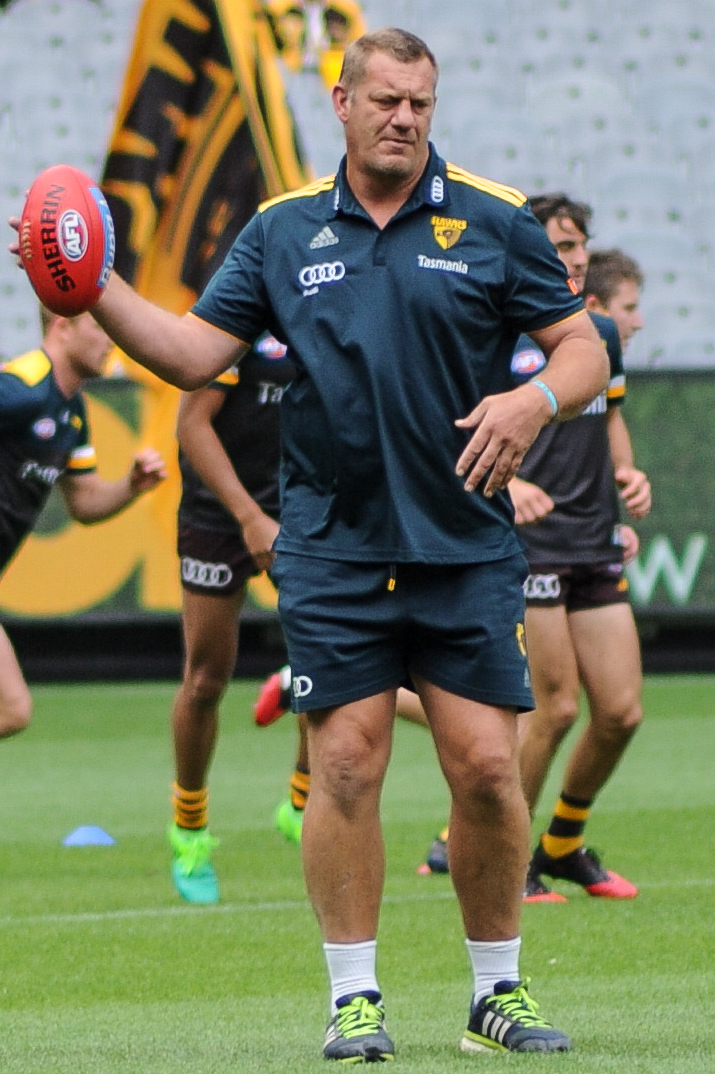
- Monkhorst in April 2017

Personal information
- Born: 21 August 1969 (age 57)
- Original team: Woori Yallock
- Height: 202 cm (6 ft 8 in)
- Weight: 116 kg (256 lb)
- Position: Ruckman

Playing career^{1}
Years	Club	Games (Goals)
1988–1999	Collingwood	205 (45)
2000	St Kilda	10 (0)
Total		215 (45)
- ^{1} Playing statistics correct to the end of 2000.

Career highlights
- AFL premiership player: 1990; AFL ANZAC Medal: 1997

Damian Monkhorst is a former Australian rules footballer who played for the Collingwood Football Club and St Kilda Football Club in the Australian Football League (AFL).

== Playing career ==
During his playing career with Collingwood, Monkhorst was known as one of the league's best and toughest ruckmen to play against.

'Monkey' came to Collingwood from Woori Yallock and made his debut in 1988 at age 18. The 202 cm, 116 kg big man was classed as a no.1 ruckman as soon as he got to Victoria Park, and his early career headed him to become a premiership ruckman in 1990. Monkhorst said that he was lucky to be playing in the Grand Final after fellow big man James Manson had a brilliant finals campaign, but Monkhorst dominated experienced performer Simon Madden after spending most of the first quarter on the bench.

Monkhorst developed well, and performed at his peak in years 1992–1994, where he finished third in the best and fairest in each of the seasons. Monkhorst proved as a tough man, but in 1994 he was involved in a controversial incident which then introduced the melee rule, as he had started a melee after running through Essendon's huddle at the start of a match.

In 1995 during the drawn Anzac Day match at the MCG in front of 95,000 spectators, Monkhorst was involved in an incident that would bring enduring social change to the AFL when he was accused of racially vilifying Essendon's Aboriginal wingman Michael Long. Monkhorst was required to attend a mediation session with Long and although Long was not happy with the outcome at the time, the handshake at the end of the session has since paved the way for very few racial taunts on the field, with less than half-a-dozen reported since.

1996 took a turn on Monkhorst's career where he was outed several times with hamstring and back injuries. In 1997 he came back but had put on weight after a foot injury plagued him. He played some decent matches and went past a 10-year mark with the Magpies before playing game 200. At the end of 1999 he was traded to St Kilda where he played the 2000 season before retiring at age 30.

== Post VFL/AFL career ==
Following his retirement from the AFL, Monkhorst returned to the Woori Yallock club to play. He maintained a strong friendship with Dermott Brereton formed during the time at Collingwood, which resulted in Brereton playing for the same club after retirement.

He has made several appearances in AFL Legends Matches.

At the start of the 2010 pre-season, Monkhorst was appointed head ruck coach of the Hawthorn Football Club, to help impart his ruck knowledge onto their ruckmen.

Monkhorst is currently (September 2023) the rucks coach at North Melbourne.

== Personal life ==
Monkhorst's eldest son, Brent, was in an induced coma in the Alfred Hospital in 2007, due to a virus that required a heart transplant, He later made a full recovery.
