= Tony Francis (Australian rules footballer) =

Australian rules footballer

Personal information
- Born: 1 April 1969 (age 57); South Australia
- Original team: Norwood (SANFL)
- Draft: No. 95, 1988 national draft
- Debut: Round 1, 1 April 1990, Collingwood vs. West Coast Eagles, at Subiaco Oval
- Height: 171 cm (5 ft 7 in)
- Weight: 74 kg (163 lb)

Playing career^{1}
Years	Club	Games (Goals)
1990—1998	Collingwood	142 (103)
1999	St Kilda	19 (5)
Total		161 (108)
- ^{1} Playing statistics correct to the end of 1999.

Career highlights
- Harry Collier Trophy 1990; Premiership side 1990; Copeland Trophy 1991; Wrecker Award 1992, 1993; 3rd Copeland Trophy 1996; South Australia State of Origin representative; 1991 All Australian Team

Tony Wayne Francis (born 1 April 1969 in South Australia) is a former Australian rules footballer in the Australian Football League.

Francis attended Campbelltown High School and first played senior football in the SANFL with the Norwood Football Club, debuting in 1988. After two seasons with the club, he was recruited by AFL side Collingwood, where he made his debut in 1990.

== Career peak ==
On his AFL debut, which was also his 21st birthday, Francis was suspended for 6 weeks due to a kicking incident. When he returned, he still showed his trademark aggression, as well as discipline and was an important member of Collingwood's 1990 premiership side.

In 1991, Francis improved further, with a major asset being bursts of pace and an ability to win the ball from tight pack situations. This form saw him take out the Copeland Trophy and earn a spot in the All-Australian Team. 1992 saw Achilles tendon problems for Francis, but he still enjoyed a solid season.

== Later career ==
Following this, Francis continued to suffer injuries, such as the thigh and knee problems that hampered him in 1995. He showed better signs, however, when he finished 3rd in the 1996 Copeland Trophy award.

1997 saw a groin injury restrict him to 10 games, and he again managed only 10 matches in the 1998 campaign. Collingwood had enough, and Francis was sent to the St Kilda Football Club for one last season in 1999. Francis enjoyed solid form as a tough rover, and played 19 matches (although the Saints' second half of the season saw them miss the finals). Soon after, Francis announced his retirement.
