= 1987 VFL finals series =

1987 premiership season
- Date: 5–26 September 1987
- Teams: 5
- Premiers: Carlton (15th premiership)
- Runners-up: Hawthorn (11th grand final)
- Minor premiers: Carlton (16th minor premiership)

Attendance
- Matches played: 6
- Total attendance: 429,057 (71,510 per match)
- Highest: 92,754 (Grand Final, Carlton vs. Hawthorn)

The 1987 Victorian Football League finals series was the 91st annual edition of the VFL/AFL final series, the Australian rules football tournament staged to determine the winner of the 1987 VFL Premiership season. The series ran over four weekends in September 1987, culminating with the 1987 VFL Grand Final at the Melbourne Cricket Ground on 26 September 1987.

== Matches ==
The 1987 VFL finals series was contested using the McIntyre final five system, which had been in use since 1972.

=== Week one (Qualifying and Elimination finals) ===
==== Elimination final (North Melbourne v Melbourne) ====
Melbourne were making their first VFL finals appearance since 1964, while North Melbourne had last appeared in 1985. This was the second final between the two sides, having previously met in the first semi-final in 1954 which was won by Melbourne.

===== Teams =====
This shows the teams as listed in The Football Record. Melbourne centreman Brian Wilson was a late withdrawal and was replaced by Russell Richards, while for North Melbourne Jim Krakouer was replaced by Shaun Smith.

North Melbourne	Melbourne

B:	27 Darren Crocker	26 Darren Harris	10 David Ackerly
HB:	7 Darren Steele	13 John Law (c)	15 Ross Smith
C:	28 Andrew Demetriou	29 Peter German	46 Jeff Chandler
HF:	8 Phil Krakouer	34 Mark Hepburn	31 Paul Spargo
F:	57 Alastair Clarkson	16 Stephen McCann	25 Donald McDonald
Foll:	4 John Mossop	9 Matthew Larkin	3 Jim Krakouer
Int:	39 Jason Love	45 Peter Jonas	
Coach:	John Kennedy		

B:	27 Sean Wight	10 Danny Hughes	29 Dean Chiron
HB:	17 Brett Lovett	35 Earl Spalding	34 Stephen Newport
C:	18 Steven Stretch	7 Brian Wilson	8 Graeme Yeats
HF:	12 Todd Viney	23 Warren Dean	2 Robert Flower (c)
F:	45 Ricky Jackson	15 David Williams	40 Tony Campbell
Foll:	37 Jim Stynes	24 Bret Bailey	33 Greg Healy
Int:	39 Doug Koop	25 Simon Eishold	
Coach:	John Northey		

===== Scorecard =====
Elimination Final
Sunday, 6 September (2:30pm)	North Melbourne	def. by	Melbourne	MCG (crowd: 72628)	Report
3.2 (20); 4.4 (28); 4.8 (32); 5.10 (40)	Q1; Q2; Q3; Final	3.6 (24); 9.11 (65); 16.16 (112); 22.26 (158)	Umpires: Clayton, Robinson; Television broadcast: ABC TV
2: P Krakouer; 1: Smith, Steele, Hepburn	Goals	5: Flower; 3: Dean, Jackson, Williams, Campbell; 2: Stynes; 1: Richards, Bailey, Viney
P Krakouer, Steele, Law	Best	Wight, Spalding, Dean, Bailey, Newport, Stynes, Jackson, Flower
Ackerly (ankle), Jonas (hamstring)	Injuries
Reports	Chiron (striking)

==== Qualifying Final (Hawthorn v Sydney) ====
The Qualifying Final saw second-placed Hawthorn host third-placed Sydney at VFL Park. The game was significant for Sydney coach Tom Hafey as he reached 500 games as coach. In what was a crushing victory for Hawthorn, Warwick Capper booted four goals to become the second player after Tony Lockett to reach 100 goals for the season, but suffered a hamstring injury which ruled him out of the semi-final. Wingman Merv Neagle also suffered a knee injury.

Scorecard

Qualifying Final
Saturday, 7 September (7:25pm)	Hawthorn	def.	Sydney	VFL Park (crowd: 47,752)	Report
5.7 (37); 9.10 (64); 16.13 (109); 23.18 (156)	Q1; Q2; Q3; Final	2.4 (16); 5.7 (37); 7.9 (51); 8.9 (57)	Umpires: Sawers, Dore; Television broadcast: ABC TV
6: Brereton; 5: Dunstall, Buckenara; 2: DiPierdomenico, Russo; 1: Schwab, Kennedy, Tuck	Goals	4: Capper; 1: Bayes, Healy, Wright, Mitchell
Buckenara, Morris, DiPierdomenico, Tuck, Kennedy, Brereton, Collins	Best	Capper, Mitchell, Williams
Robinson (hamstring)	Injuries	Capper (hamstring), Neagle (knee)
Nil	Reports	Nil

=== Week two (semi-finals) ===
==== First Semi-final (Sydney vs Melbourne) ====
The First Semi-final saw Melbourne host Sydney at the MCG. This was the second VFL final contested between the two clubs, having met for the first time back in the 1936 Preliminary Final, when Sydney were formerly based in South Melbourne. South Melbourne won that encounter 13.11 (89) to 8.15 (63).

Scorecard

First semi-final
Saturday, 13 September (2:30pm)	Sydney	def. by	Melbourne	MCG (crowd: 80,292)	Report
3.3 (21); 6.6 (42); 8.12 (60); 10.13 (73)	Q1; Q2; Q3; Final	2.4 (16); 10.13 (73); 17.18 (120); 21.23 (149)	Umpires: Cameron, Howlett; Television broadcast: ABC TV
Gerard Healy, Carroll, Morwood 2 Williams, Scott, Coleman, Wright 1	Goals	4 Flower; 3 Greg Healy, Campbell; 2 Stretch, Viney, Yeats; 1: Dean, Jackson, Stynes, Williams, Wilson
Gerard Healy, Mitchell, Williams, Bolton, Carter, Browning	Best	Stretch, Lovett, Yeats, Flower, Jackson, Greg Healy, Eishold, Dean, O'Dwyer
Nil	Injuries	Nil
Nil	Reports	Nil

==== Second Semi-final (Carlton vs Hawthorn) ====
The Second Semi-final saw minor premier Carlton play Hawthorn at VFL Park. This marked the seventh VFL final contested between the two clubs, having previously met in the 1986 VFL Grand Final which was won by Hawthorn. The two teams met twice during the 1987 home-and-away season in Rounds 1 and 14, with the Hawks winning both encounters.

Scorecard

Second semi-final
Saturday, 12 September (2:30pm)	Carlton	def.	Hawthorn	VFL Park (crowd: 64,333)	Report
1.2 (8); 2.11 (23); 6.12 (48); 11.14 (80)	Q1; Q2; Q3; Final	3.2 (20); 6.2 (38); 9.3 (57); 10.5 (65)	Umpires: Clayton, Sawers; Television broadcast: ABC TV
Kernahan 3 Evans 2 Johnston, Hunter, Naley, Sartori, Madden, McKenzie 1	Goals	2 Dunstall, Platten; 1 Curran, Buckenara, Loveridge, DiPierdomenico, Brereton, Kennedy
Naley, Johnston, Hunter, Bradley, Alvin, Madden, Aitken, Silvagni	Best	Platten, Tuck, Langford, Kennedy, Ayres, Schwab
Injuries	Dunstall (ankle)
Nil	Reports	Nil

=== Week three (Preliminary Final) ===
==== Preliminary final (Hawthorn vs Melbourne) ====
The Preliminary Final saw Hawthorn play Melbourne at VFL Park on Saturday 19 September for the right to contest the grand final against Carlton. Among the spectators was Wimbledon champion and Hawks fan Pat Cash, who had interrupted a holiday in Queensland with family to attend the match.

===== Teams =====
The line-ups as announced on the Thursday before the game were as published in The Football Record.

Hawthorn
B:	39 Paul Abbott	24 Chris Langford	7 Gary Ayres (vc)
HB:	17 Michael Tuck (c)	2 Chris Mew	1 Ray Jencke
C:	4 Peter Russo	30 Peter Schwab	9 Robert DiPierdomenico
HF:	11 Gary Buckenara	15 Russell Morris	34 John Kennedy Jr.
F:	25 Peter Curran	23 Dermott Brereton	22 Richard Loveridge
Foll:	14 Greg Dear	29 Russell Greene	44 John Platten
Int:	13 Paul Dear	41 Darrin Pritchard	
Coach:	Allan Jeans		

Melbourne
B:	29 Dean Chiron	10 Danny Hughes	27 Sean Wight
HB:	17 Brett Lovett	35 Earl Spalding	34 Stephen Newport
C:	18 Steven Stretch	7 Brian Wilson	8 Graeme Yeats
HF:	12 Todd Viney	23 Warren Dean	2 Robert Flower (c)
F:	45 Ricky Jackson	40 Tony Campbell	37 Jim Stynes
Foll:	32 Steven O'Dwyer	24 Bret Bailey	33 Greg Healy (vc)
Int:	25 Simon Eishold	14 Rod Grinter	
Coach:	John Northey		

There were no late changes for either side.

===== Match Summary =====
Although kicking against the wind, it was Hawthorn who controlled most of the play early in the game until Demons took the lead. The lead for most of the many until the frenetic final minutes, Hawthon’s Gary Bukenara marks just before the final siren. A 15-meter penalty, due to Melbourne’s Jim Stynes running over the mark, helped him kick a goal, with Hawthorn winning by 2 points.

===== Scorecard =====
Preliminary Final
Saturday, 19 September (2:30pm)	Hawthorn	def.	Melbourne	VFL Park (crowd: 71,298)	Report
1.4 (10); 3.6 (24); 7.8 (50); 11.14 (80)	Q1; Q2; Q3; Final	2.3 (15); 6.10 (46); 10.12 (72); 10.18 (78)	Umpires: Robinson, Howlett; Television broadcast: ABC TV
Buckenara 5 Jencke, Morris, Curran, Brereton, Pritchard, Kennedy 1	Goals	3 Jackson; 2 Wilson, Grinter; 1 Viney, Stynes, Dean
Schwab, Buckenara, Tuck, Russo, Langford, Ayres	Best	Jackson, Wight, Viney, Hughes, Spalding, Healy, Chiron
DiPierdomenico (bruised shoulder), Kennedy (bruised thigh), Mew (slight concussion)	Injuries	Wilson (dislocated shoulder), Flower (bruised shoulder)
Morris (striking)	Reports	Nil

=== Week four (Grand Final) ===
This was the second consecutive Grand Final involving Carlton, who were chasing a League record 15th VFL premiership, and Hawthorn, who were chasing their 7th premiership and aiming for their first set of back-to-back flags.

Grand Final
26 September (2:50 pm)	Carlton	def.	Hawthorn	MCG (crowd: 92,754)	Report
3.5 (23); 6.8 (44); 10.11 (71); 15.14 (104)	Q1; Q2; Q3; Final	4.2 (26); 4.9 (33); 7.13 (55); 9.17 (71)	Umpires: Robinson, Sawers; Norm Smith Medal: David Rhys-Jones; Television broadcast: ABC; National anthem: Daryl Somers
Kernahan, Bradley 3 Johnston 2 Dorotich, Gleeson, Murphy, Hunter, Naley, McKenzie, Meldrum 1	Goals	3: Kennedy; 1: Curran, Collins, Pritchard, Platten, DiPierdomenico, G Dear
Rhys-Jones, Johnston, Glascott, Aitken, Madden, Alvin	Best	Langford, DiPierdomenico, Tuck, Collins, Ayres, Greene
Nil	Injuries	Nil
Johnston (striking), Madden (striking)	Reports	Nil

== Bibliography ==
- Atkinson, Graeme; Atkinson, Brant (2009). The Complete Book of AFL Finals (5th ed.). Scoresby, Victoria: The Five Mile Press. ISBN 978-1-74211-275-6.
