= 1988 VFL grand final =

Grand final of the 1988 Victorian Football League season

1988 VFL Grand Final

Hawthorn	Melbourne
22.20 (152)	6.20 (56)
	1	2	3	4
HAW	4.4 (28)	10.9 (69)	14.16 (100)	22.20 (152)
MEL	1.5 (11)	2.8 (20)	5.14 (44)	6.20 (56)
- Date: 24 September 1988
- Stadium: Melbourne Cricket Ground, Melbourne, Australia
- Attendance: 93,754
- Favourite: Hawthorn

Accolades
- Norm Smith Medallist: Gary Ayres (Hawthorn)
- Jock McHale Medallist: Alan Joyce

Broadcast in Australia
- Network: Seven Network

The 1988 VFL grand final was an Australian rules football game contested between the Hawthorn Football Club and the Melbourne Football Club, held at the Melbourne Cricket Ground in Melbourne on 24 September 1988. It was the 92nd annual grand final of the Victorian Football League, staged to determine the premiers for the 1988 VFL season. The match, attended by 93,754 spectators, was won by Hawthorn by a margin of 96 points, marking that club's seventh premiership victory.

== Background ==
It was Hawthorn's sixth successive grand final appearance, while Melbourne was competing in its first since winning the 1964 VFL grand final.

At the conclusion of the home and away season, Hawthorn had finished first on the VFL ladder with 19 wins and 3 losses. Melbourne had finished fifth with 13 wins and 9 losses. In the finals series , Melbourne defeated West Coast by two points in the elimination final, then defeated Collingwood by 13 points in the first semi-final, then Carlton by 22 points in the preliminary final. Hawthorn had a much easier finals run, winning the second semi-final against Carlton by 21 points to advance straight to the grand final, thus having played only one game in the four weeks preceding the grand final.

In the two meetings between the teams in the regular season, Melbourne defeated Hawthorn by 21 points in round 7, and Hawthorn defeated Melbourne by 69 points in round 17.

== Match summary ==
Hawthorn rover Chris Wittman broke his arm early in the game and played no further part. The game was fairly competitive for the first quarter, Hawthorn leading by 17 points at quarter time. Hawthorn completely dominated the game thereafter, leading by 49 points by half time, 56 points at three-quarter time, and ultimately winning by 96 points. The win set a new VFL record for the greatest winning margin in a grand final, surpassing the record of 83 points which Hawthorn had itself set in 1983. This margin remained a record until Geelong's 119-point defeat of Port Adelaide in 2007.

The Norm Smith Medal was awarded to Hawthorn defender Gary Ayres for being judged the best player afield, with 22 disposals despite sustaining a fractured cheek bone in the first quarter. Ayres nullified dangerous Melbourne player Greg Healy and set up many of Hawthorn's attacks from the defensive line. Jason Dunstall kicked 7 goals, Paul Abbott kicked 6 goals and Dermott Brereton kicked 5 goals for Hawthorn. Irish player Jim Stynes, in just his full season of VFL football, was best on ground for Melbourne.

Hawks coach Alan Joyce, who replaced an ill Allan Jeans for the 1988 season, said: "I have never seen a more awesome, more inspiring passage of play than the 15-minute mark of the second quarter. I saw about a dozen Hawthorn players in a wave going down the field. It was a human chain, crashing through a desperate opposition and forcing the ball forward."

In a lesser-known streaker incident, a woman ran naked across the ground during the last quarter and was promptly arrested.

== Teams ==
Hawthorn	Melbourne

Hawthorn
B:	40 Andrew Collins	24 Chris Langford	7 Gary Ayres
HB:	20 Scott Maginness	2 Chris Mew	17 Michael Tuck (c)
C:	9 Robert DiPierdomenico	30 Peter Schwab	6 Tony Hall
HF:	10 Chris Wittman	23 Dermott Brereton	34 John Kennedy
F:	39 Paul Abbott	19 Jason Dunstall	35 James Morrissey
Foll:	14 Greg Dear	11 Gary Buckenara	44 John Platten
Int:	29 Russell Greene	18 Darrin Pritchard	
Coach:	Alan Joyce		

Melbourne
B:	9 Alan Johnson	18 Steven Stretch	14 Rod Grinter
HB:	34 Stephen Newport	28 Jamie Duursma	17 Brett Lovett
C:	12 Todd Viney	7 Brian Wilson	8 Graeme Yeats
HF:	3 Garry Lyon	5 Earl Spalding	15 David Williams
F:	11 Jim Stynes	27 Sean Wight	45 Ricky Jackson
Foll:	10 Danny Hughes	16 Andy Lovell	33 Greg Healy (c)
Int:	37 David Flintoff	21 Steven Febey	
Coach:	John Northey		

== Goal kickers ==
Hawthorn

- Dunstall 7
- Abbott 6
- Brereton 5
- DiPierdomenico 1
- Kennedy 1
- Morrissey 1
- Schwab 1

Melbourne

- Lyon 2
- Williams 2
- Healy 1
- Johnson 1

== See also ==
- 1988 VFL season
