= 1990 AFL season =

94th season of the Australian Football League (AFL)

1990 AFL premiership season
- Teams: 14
- Premiers: Collingwood; 14th premiership
- Minor premiers: Essendon; 13th minor premiership
- Pre-season cup: Essendon; 1st pre-season cup win
- Brownlow Medallist: Tony Liberatore (Footscray)
- Coleman Medallist: John Longmire (North Melbourne)

Attendance
- Matches played: 161
- Total attendance: 4,086,283 (25,381 per match)
- Highest: 98,944 (Grand final, Collingwood vs. Essendon)

The 1990 AFL season was the 94th season of the Australian Football League (AFL) and the first under this name, having been known as the Victorian Football League until 1989. It was the highest level senior Australian rules football competition and administrative body in Victoria; and, as it featured clubs from New South Wales, Queensland and Western Australia, it was the de facto highest level senior competition in Australia. The season featured fourteen clubs, ran from 31 March until 6 October, and comprised a 22-game home-and-away season followed by a finals series featuring the top five clubs.

The premiership was won by the Collingwood Football Club for the 14th time, after it defeated Essendon by 48 points in the 1990 AFL Grand Final.

== Club leadership ==
| Club | Coaches | Chairman/President | Executive Director/General Manager | Football Manager | Leadership group | Ref. |
|---|---|---|---|---|---|---|
| Brisbane Bears | Norm Dare (senior); Rodney Eade (reserves) | Noel Gordon | Andrew Ireland | Shane O'Sullivan | Roger Merrett (captain); Scott McIvor (v/captain); Martin Leslie (deputy v/c) | |
| Carlton | Alex Jesaulenko (senior); Rod Ashman (reserves); Ross Henshaw (under 19s) | John Elliott | Ian Collins | Stephen Gough | Stephen Kernahan (captain); Craig Bradley (v/captain); David Rhys-Jones (deputy v/c) | |
| Collingwood | Leigh Matthews (senior); Michael Taylor (reserves); Keith Burns (under 19s) | Allan McAlister | Rob Petrie | Graeme Allan | Tony Shaw (captain); Peter Daicos (v/captain); Brian Taylor, Gavin Crosisca, Darren Millane (deputy v/captains) | |
| Essendon | Kevin Sheedy (senior); Mervyn Keane (reserves); Ray Jordon (under 19s) | Ron Evans | David Shaw (exec. director); Roger Hampson (gen. manager) | Kevin Egan | Tim Watson (captain); Simon Madden (v/captain); Mark Thompson (deputy v/c) | |
| Fitzroy | Rod Austin (senior); Robert Shaw (reserves); Leigh Carlson (under 19s) | Leon Wiegard | Max Kelleher | Arthur Wilson | Paul Roos (captain); Gary Pert (v/captain) | |
| Footscray | Terry Wheeler (senior); Trevor Fletcher (reserves); Neil Clarke (under 19s) | Peter Gordon | Dennis Galimberti | Gary Merrington | Doug Hawkins (captain); Stephen Wallis (v/captain); Tony McGuinness (deputy v/c) | |
| Geelong | Malcolm Blight (senior); Dennis Davey (reserves); Brendan Tinkler (under 19s) | Ron Hovey | Ken Gannon | Garry Fletcher | Andrew Bews (captain); Steve Hocking (v/captain); Barry Stoneham (deputy v/c) | |
| Hawthorn | Allan Jeans (senior); Des Meagher (reserves); Russell Greene (under 19s) | Trevor Coote | John Lauritz | John Hook (football manager); Alan Joyce (director of football) | Michael Tuck (captain); Gary Ayres (v/captain) | |
| Melbourne | John Northey (senior); Mark Cross (reserves & under 19s) | Stuart Spencer | Tony King | John Sell | Greg Healy (captain); Garry Lyon (v/captain); Jim Stynes (deputy v/c) | |
| North Melbourne | Wayne Schimmelbusch (senior); Laurie Dwyer (reserves); Denis Pagan (under 19s) | Bob Ansett | Ken Montgomery | Greg Miller | Matthew Larkin (captain); Ben Buckley (v/captain) | |
| Richmond | Kevin Bartlett (senior); Emmett Dunne (reserves); Doug Searl (under 19s) | Neville Crowe | Cameron Schwab | John Wardrop | Dale Weightman (captain); Michael Pickering (v/captain) | |
| St Kilda | Ken Sheldon (senior); Warren Jones (reserves); Gary Colling (under 19s) | Travis Payze | Rick Watt | Peter Hudson | Danny Frawley (captain) | |
| Sydney | Colin Kinnear (senior); Mark Maclure (reserves); Greg Harris (under 19s) | Michael Willesee | Geoff Slade (exec. director); Barry Breen (gen. manager) | John Reid | Dennis Carroll (captain); Gerard Healy (v/captain); Greg Williams (deputy v/c) | |
| West Coast | Michael Malthouse (senior) | Terry O'Connor | Brian Cook | Trevor Nisbett | Steve Malaxos (captain); John Worsfold (v/captain); Phil Scott (deputy v/c) | |

== Foster's Cup ==
Essendon defeated North Melbourne 17.10 (112) to 10.16 (76) in the final.

== Home-and-away season ==
=== Round 1 ===
| Home team | Home team score | Away team | Away team score | Ground | Crowd | Date |
|---|---|---|---|---|---|---|
| Carlton | 14.15 (99) | Sydney | 15.14 (104) | Princes Park | 22,427 | Saturday 31, March |
| Essendon | 20.21 (141) | Fitzroy | 8.12 (60) | Windy Hill | 18,960 | Saturday 31, March |
| Geelong | 11.11 (77) | Hawthorn | 28.24 (192) | Waverley Park | 41,694 | Saturday, 31 March |
| North Melbourne | 12.17 (89) | Melbourne | 22.10 (142) | MCG | 23,191 | Saturday, 31 March |
| Brisbane Bears | 19.19 (133) | Richmond | 10.14 (74) | Carrara Stadium | 11,814 | Saturday, 31 March |
| West Coast | 14.16 (100) | Collingwood | 8.6 (54) | Subiaco Oval | 25,342 | Sunday, 1 April |
| Footscray | 11.15 (81) | St Kilda | 22.12 (144) | Whitten Oval | 28,553 | Sunday, 1 April |

=== Round 2 ===
| Home team | Home team score | Away team | Away team score | Ground | Crowd | Date |
|---|---|---|---|---|---|---|
| Richmond | 9.14 (68) | North Melbourne | 32.17 (209) | MCG | 18,105 | Friday, 6 April |
| Carlton | 13.9 (87) | Collingwood | 19.8 (122) | Waverley Park | 44,906 | Saturday, 7 April |
| Fitzroy | 13.20 (98) | Brisbane Bears | 8.11 (59) | Princes Park | 6,838 | Saturday, 7 April |
| Melbourne | 18.20 (128) | Geelong | 13.13 (91) | MCG | 29,024 | Saturday, 7 April |
| St Kilda | 18.19 (127) | West Coast | 10.9 (69) | Moorabbin Oval | 23,161 | Saturday, 7 April |
| Essendon | 24.15 (159) | Hawthorn | 14.13 (97) | MCG | 55,311 | Sunday, 8 April |
| Sydney | 10.18 (78) | Footscray | 20.20 (140) | SCG | 11,051 | Sunday, 8 April |

=== Round 3 ===
| Home team | Home team score | Away team | Away team score | Ground | Crowd | Date |
|---|---|---|---|---|---|---|
| St Kilda | 11.10 (76) | Carlton | 14.8 (92) | Waverley Park | 53,065 | Saturday 14, April |
| Footscray | 7.17 (59) | West Coast | 18.14 (122) | Whitten Oval | 14,842 | Saturday 14, April |
| Hawthorn | 15.21 (111) | Richmond | 10.21 (81) | Princes Park | 11,698 | Saturday 14, April |
| Brisbane Bears | 14.11 (95) | North Melbourne | 17.11 (113) | Carrara Stadium | 8,683 | Sunday 15, April |
| Collingwood | 20.8 (128) | Sydney | 12.21 (93) | Victoria Park | 27,839 | Monday 16, April |
| Melbourne | 18.14 (122) | Essendon | 14.11 (95) | MCG | 59,894 | Monday 16, April |
| Geelong | 22.18 (150) | Fitzroy | 11.11 (77) | Kardinia Park | 23,031 | Monday 16, April |

=== Round 4 ===
| Home team | Home team score | Away team | Away team score | Ground | Crowd | Date |
|---|---|---|---|---|---|---|
| West Coast | 17.18 (120) | Carlton | 10.10 (70) | WACA Ground | 28,568 | Friday 20, April |
| Collingwood | 14.12 (96) | Footscray | 11.12 (78) | Victoria Park | 17,948 | Saturday 21, April |
| Richmond | 6.13 (49) | Essendon | 18.19 (127) | MCG | 17,975 | Saturday 21, April |
| Fitzroy | 9.10 (64) | Melbourne | 13.11 (89) | Waverley Park | 13,671 | Saturday 21, April |
| Hawthorn | 18.12 (120) | Brisbane Bears | 5.8 (38) | Princes Park | 8,649 | Saturday 21, April |
| North Melbourne | 15.22 (112) | Geelong | 20.23 (143) | MCG | 28,512 | Sunday 22, April |
| Sydney | 13.19 (97) | St Kilda | 19.17 (131) | SCG | 11,472 | Sunday 22, April |

=== Round 5 ===
| Home team | Home team score | Away team | Away team score | Ground | Crowd | Date |
|---|---|---|---|---|---|---|
| Carlton | 10.16 (76) | Footscray | 15.13 (103) | Princes Park | 24,960 | Wednesday 25, April |
| Richmond | 21.17 (143) | Fitzroy | 9.10 (64) | MCG | 23,078 | Wednesday 25, April |
| St Kilda | 13.13 (91) | Collingwood | 12.20 (92) | MCG | 67,893 | Saturday 28, April |
| Essendon | 11.15 (81) | Geelong | 12.17 (89) | Waverley Park | 42,097 | Saturday 28, April |
| Hawthorn | 16.12 (108) | North Melbourne | 10.18 (78) | Princes Park | 13,144 | Saturday 28, April |
| Brisbane Bears | 8.13 (61) | Melbourne | 19.11 (125) | Carrara Stadium | 9,381 | Saturday 28, April |
| West Coast | 19.14 (128) | Sydney | 10.7 (67) | Subiaco Oval | 25,683 | Sunday 29, April |

=== Round 6 ===
| Home team | Home team score | Away team | Away team score | Ground | Crowd | Date |
|---|---|---|---|---|---|---|
| Richmond | 9.14 (68) | West Coast | 15.13 (103) | MCG | 17,229 | Friday 4, May |
| Carlton | 20.13 (133) | North Melbourne | 14.19 (103) | Princes Park | 17,555 | Saturday 5, May |
| Collingwood | 10.15 (75) | Essendon | 15.11 (101) | MCG | 63,218 | Saturday 5, May |
| Footscray | 12.10 (82) | Fitzroy | 5.20 (50) | Waverley Park | 13,610 | Saturday 5, May |
| Geelong | 23.13 (151) | Brisbane Bears | 12.8 (80) | Kardinia Park | 18,426 | Saturday 5, May |
| St Kilda | 15.14 (104) | Hawthorn | 14.17 (101) | Moorabbin Oval | 30,895 | Saturday 5, May |
| Sydney | 14.14 (98) | Melbourne | 12.21 (93) | SCG | 10,155 | Sunday 6, May |

=== Round 7 ===
| Home team | Home team score | Away team | Away team score | Ground | Crowd | Date |
|---|---|---|---|---|---|---|
| Melbourne | 18.8 (116) | West Coast | 9.7 (61) | MCG | 32,269 | Friday 11, May |
| Essendon | 13.13 (91) | Carlton | 17.9 (111) | Windy Hill | 22,198 | Saturday 12, May |
| Collingwood | 13.14 (92) | Hawthorn | 13.16 (94) | Waverley Park | 48,099 | Saturday 12, May |
| Fitzroy | 18.13 (121) | St Kilda | 15.13 (103) | Princes Park | 14,524 | Saturday 12, May |
| North Melbourne | 12.13 (85) | Footscray | 12.15 (87) | MCG | 16,155 | Saturday 12, May |
| Geelong | 9.28 (82) | Richmond | 13.18 (96) | Kardinia Park | 21,181 | Sunday 13, May |
| Brisbane Bears | 14.12 (96) | Sydney | 13.10 (88) | Carrara Stadium | 7,226 | Sunday 13, May |

=== Round 8 ===
| Home team | Home team score | Away team | Away team score | Ground | Crowd | Date |
|---|---|---|---|---|---|---|
| Sydney | 15.17 (107) | Geelong | 13.20 (98) | SCG | 8,960 | Friday 18, May |
| Carlton | 18.18 (126) | Hawthorn | 9.5 (59) | Waverley Park | 36,370 | Saturday 19, May |
| Fitzroy | 9.21 (75) | Collingwood | 17.18 (120) | Princes Park | 16,530 | Saturday 19, May |
| Melbourne | 20.13 (133) | Richmond | 11.14 (80) | MCG | 26,376 | Saturday 19, May |
| St Kilda | 12.22 (94) | North Melbourne | 11.12 (78) | Moorabbin Oval | 22,351 | Saturday 19, May |
| Footscray | 11.12 (78) | Essendon | 14.13 (97) | Whitten Oval | 25,255 | Sunday 20, May |
| West Coast | 16.26 (122) | Brisbane Bears | 9.9 (63) | Subiaco Oval | 20,457 | Sunday 20, May |

=== Round 9 ===
| Home team | Home team score | Away team | Away team score | Ground | Crowd | Date |
|---|---|---|---|---|---|---|
| Carlton | 18.15 (123) | Fitzroy | 11.16 (82) | Princes Park | 19,052 | Saturday 26, May |
| Collingwood | 26.20 (176) | North Melbourne | 14.12 (96) | Victoria Park | 22,232 | Saturday 26, May |
| Essendon | 18.16 (124) | St Kilda | 17.11 (113) | Windy Hill | 21,251 | Saturday 26, May |
| Hawthorn | 14.8 (92) | Melbourne | 7.6 (48) | Waverley Park | 39,701 | Saturday 26, May |
| Brisbane Bears | 8.8 (56) | Footscray | 19.11 (125) | Carrara Stadium | 6,628 | Saturday 26, May |
| West Coast | 16.16 (112) | Geelong | 13.15 (93) | Subiaco Oval | 21,323 | Sunday 27, May |
| Richmond | 20.19 (139) | Sydney | 9.6 (60) | MCG | 19,465 | Sunday 27, May |

=== Round 10 ===
| Home team | Home team score | Away team | Away team score | Ground | Crowd | Date |
|---|---|---|---|---|---|---|
| North Melbourne | 17.16 (118) | West Coast | 13.12 (90) | MCG | 9,377 | Friday 1, June |
| Richmond | 15.18 (108) | Carlton | 13.7 (85) | MCG | 31,648 | Saturday 2, June |
| Collingwood | 16.14 (110) | Melbourne | 9.4 (58) | Waverley Park | 49,655 | Saturday 2, June |
| Fitzroy | 15.13 (103) | Hawthorn | 13.11 (89) | Princes Park | 11,329 | Saturday 2, June |
| St Kilda | 21.22 (148) | Brisbane Bears | 10.11 (71) | Moorabbin Oval | 14,099 | Saturday 2, June |
| Sydney | 11.8 (74) | Essendon | 25.14 (164) | SCG | 12,551 | Sunday 3, June |
| Geelong | 14.12 (96) | Footscray | 13.16 (94) | Kardinia Park | 26,073 | Sunday 3, June |

=== Round 11 ===
| Home team | Home team score | Away team | Away team score | Ground | Crowd | Date |
|---|---|---|---|---|---|---|
| Essendon | 15.9 (99) | West Coast | 8.12 (60) | Windy Hill | 19,427 | Saturday 9, June |
| St Kilda | 15.14 (104) | Geelong | 16.16 (112) | Waverley Park | 47,572 | Saturday 9, June |
| Hawthorn | 19.18 (132) | Sydney | 11.17 (83) | Princes Park | 11,848 | Saturday 9, June |
| Brisbane Bears | 10.13 (73) | Collingwood | 15.17 (107) | Carrara Stadium | 12,339 | Sunday 10, June |
| Melbourne | 15.9 (99) | Carlton | 13.15 (93) | MCG | 59,782 | Monday 11, June |
| Fitzroy | 11.12 (78) | North Melbourne | 15.10 (100) | Princes Park | 13,271 | Monday 11, June |
| Footscray | 15.6 (96) | Richmond | 12.10 (82) | Whitten Oval | 29,698 | Monday 11, June |

=== Round 12 ===
| Home team | Home team score | Away team | Away team score | Ground | Crowd | Date |
|---|---|---|---|---|---|---|
| West Coast | 16.9 (105) | Hawthorn | 12.10 (82) | WACA | 28,094 | Friday 15, June |
| Carlton | 24.14 (158) | Brisbane Bears | 11.23 (89) | Princes Park | 11,738 | Saturday 16, June |
| Geelong | 12.16 (88) | Collingwood | 14.15 (99) | Waverley Park | 53,917 | Saturday 16, June |
| Essendon | 18.16 (124) | North Melbourne | 13.16 (94) | Windy Hill | 16,311 | Saturday 16, June |
| Richmond | 18.20 (128) | St Kilda | 16.12 (108) | MCG | 31,180 | Saturday 16, June |
| Sydney | 10.11 (71) | Fitzroy | 17.14 (116) | SCG | 6,136 | Sunday 17, June |
| Footscray | 10.8 (68) | Melbourne | 15.11 (101) | Whitten Oval | 17,828 | Sunday 17, June |

=== Round 13 ===
| Home team | Home team score | Away team | Away team score | Ground | Crowd | Date |
|---|---|---|---|---|---|---|
| Carlton | 18.15 (123) | Geelong | 13.26 (104) | Princes Park | 29,571 | Saturday 23, June |
| Melbourne | 14.15 (99) | St Kilda | 20.12 (132) | MCG | 38,511 | Saturday 23, June |
| Brisbane Bears | 7.13 (55) | Essendon | 15.19 (109) | Carrara Stadium | 10,105 | Saturday 23, June |
| Collingwood | 14.17 (101) | Richmond | 5.12 (42) | Victoria Park | 31,447 | Saturday 30, June |
| Hawthorn | 10.13 (73) | Footscray | 14.7 (91) | Waverley Park | 22,388 | Saturday 30, June |
| North Melbourne | 18.23 (131) | Sydney | 5.11 (41) | MCG | 10,721 | Saturday 30, June |
| West Coast | 20.8 (128) | Fitzroy | 13.13 (91) | Subiaco Oval | 20,133 | Sunday 1, July |

=== Round 14 ===
| Home team | Home team score | Away team | Away team score | Ground | Crowd | Date |
|---|---|---|---|---|---|---|
| Richmond | 22.21 (153) | Brisbane Bears | 10.11 (71) | MCG | 11,438 | Friday 6, July |
| Collingwood | 15.12 (102) | West Coast | 11.10 (76) | Victoria Park | 23,596 | Saturday 7, July |
| Fitzroy | 9.7 (61) | Essendon | 20.24 (144) | Princes Park | 13,339 | Saturday 7, July |
| St Kilda | 11.12 (78) | Footscray | 12.13 (85) | Moorabbin Oval | 28,202 | Saturday 7, July |
| Hawthorn | 18.10 (118) | Geelong | 7.8 (50) | Waverley Park | 30,211 | Saturday 7, July |
| Melbourne | 10.13 (73) | North Melbourne | 31.14 (200) | MCG | 19,272 | Saturday 7, July |
| Sydney | 13.12 (90) | Carlton | 25.12 (162) | SCG | 10,555 | Sunday 8, July |

=== Round 15 ===
| Home team | Home team score | Away team | Away team score | Ground | Crowd | Date |
|---|---|---|---|---|---|---|
| West Coast | 16.12 (108) | St Kilda | 14.6 (90) | WACA | 20,474 | Friday 13, July |
| Collingwood | 17.11 (113) | Carlton | 8.11 (59) | Waverley Park | 76,390 | Saturday 14, July |
| Hawthorn | 10.7 (67) | Essendon | 21.16 (142) | Princes Park | 25,159 | Saturday 14, July |
| Footscray | 17.10 (112) | Sydney | 13.18 (96) | Whitten Oval | 13,184 | Saturday 14, July |
| Geelong | 17.11 (113) | Melbourne | 15.13 (103) | Kardinia Park | 18,265 | Saturday 14, July |
| North Melbourne | 22.12 (144) | Richmond | 15.10 (100) | MCG | 21,426 | Saturday 14, July |
| Brisbane Bears | 17.9 (111) | Fitzroy | 9.8 (62) | Carrara Stadium | 7,347 | Sunday 15, July |

=== Round 16 ===
| Home team | Home team score | Away team | Away team score | Ground | Crowd | Date |
|---|---|---|---|---|---|---|
| West Coast | 16.13 (109) | Footscray | 9.12 (66) | WACA | 20,296 | Friday 20, July |
| Carlton | 19.9 (123) | St Kilda | 15.18 (108) | Princes Park | 25,235 | Saturday 21, July |
| Essendon | 15.16 (106) | Melbourne | 17.12 (114) | Windy Hill | 19,945 | Saturday 21, July |
| Fitzroy | 17.6 (108) | Geelong | 12.9 (81) | Waverley Park | 13,335 | Saturday 21, July |
| Richmond | 10.8 (68) | Hawthorn | 25.9 (159) | MCG | 25,532 | Saturday 21, July |
| Sydney | 19.9 (123) | Collingwood | 21.21 (147) | SCG | 11,722 | Sunday 22, July |
| North Melbourne | 13.12 (90) | Brisbane Bears | 7.12 (54) | MCG | 8,310 | Sunday 22, July |

=== Round 17 ===
| Home team | Home team score | Away team | Away team score | Ground | Crowd | Date |
|---|---|---|---|---|---|---|
| Carlton | 15.11 (101) | West Coast | 20.12 (132) | Princes Park | 18,712 | Saturday 28, July |
| Essendon | 18.17 (125) | Richmond | 6.10 (46) | Waverley Park | 24,436 | Saturday 28, July |
| Melbourne | 15.19 (109) | Fitzroy | 12.18 (90) | MCG | 20,222 | Saturday 28, July |
| Geelong | 17.8 (110) | North Melbourne | 20.11 (131) | Kardinia Park | 18,018 | Saturday 28, July |
| St Kilda | 22.16 (148) | Sydney | 10.13 (73) | Moorabbin Oval | 19,108 | Saturday 28, July |
| Footscray | 14.12 (96) | Collingwood | 12.21 (93) | MCG | 52,724 | Sunday 29, July |
| Brisbane Bears | 14.11 (95) | Hawthorn | 16.14 (110) | Carrara Stadium | 8,768 | Sunday 29, July |

=== Round 18 ===
| Home team | Home team score | Away team | Away team score | Ground | Crowd | Date |
|---|---|---|---|---|---|---|
| North Melbourne | 14.14 (98) | Hawthorn | 15.18 (108) | MCG | 44,627 | Friday 3, August |
| Collingwood | 16.21 (117) | St Kilda | 7.7 (49) | Victoria Park | 28,301 | Saturday 4, August |
| Geelong | 14.8 (92) | Essendon | 13.16 (94) | Kardinia Park | 21,796 | Saturday 4, August |
| Fitzroy | 16.17 (113) | Richmond | 10.15 (75) | Princes Park | 8,949 | Saturday 4, August |
| Melbourne | 10.13 (73) | Brisbane Bears | 9.6 (60) | Waverley Park | 10,890 | Saturday 4, August |
| Footscray | 9.13 (67) | Carlton | 15.6 (96) | Whitten Oval | 22,142 | Sunday 5, August |
| Sydney | 10.8 (68) | West Coast | 12.11 (83) | SCG | 6,970 | Sunday 5, August |

=== Round 19 ===
| Home team | Home team score | Away team | Away team score | Ground | Crowd | Date |
|---|---|---|---|---|---|---|
| Fitzroy | 12.16 (88) | Footscray | 17.21 (123) | Princes Park | 10,482 | Saturday 11, August |
| Hawthorn | 17.17 (119) | St Kilda | 13.5 (83) | Waverley Park | 27,612 | Saturday 11, August |
| Melbourne | 27.11 (173) | Sydney | 15.16 (106) | MCG | 16,719 | Saturday 11, August |
| Brisbane Bears | 25.13 (163) | Geelong | 14.13 (97) | Carrara Stadium | 8,180 | Saturday 11, August |
| North Melbourne | 13.11 (89) | Carlton | 7.13 (55) | MCG | 21,094 | Sunday 12, August |
| Essendon | 13.6 (84) | Collingwood | 11.12 (78) | Waverley Park | 65,293 | Sunday 12, August |
| West Coast | 22.21 (153) | Richmond | 16.9 (105) | Subiaco Oval | 22,939 | Sunday 12, August |

=== Round 20 ===
| Home team | Home team score | Away team | Away team score | Ground | Crowd | Date |
|---|---|---|---|---|---|---|
| Sydney | 11.20 (86) | Brisbane Bears | 7.13 (55) | SCG | 5,272 | Friday 17, August |
| Carlton | 16.11 (107) | Essendon | 12.15 (87) | Princes Park | 25,455 | Saturday 18, August |
| Hawthorn | 26.7 (163) | Collingwood | 12.8 (80) | Waverley Park | 53,982 | Saturday 18, August |
| St Kilda | 17.15 (117) | Fitzroy | 18.8 (116) | Moorabbin Oval | 13,712 | Saturday 18, August |
| Footscray | 12.16 (88) | North Melbourne | 17.13 (115) | Whitten Oval | 16,087 | Saturday 18, August |
| Richmond | 14.10 (94) | Geelong | 24.14 (158) | MCG | 16,984 | Saturday 18, August |
| West Coast | 15.13 (103) | Melbourne | 21.13 (139) | Subiaco Oval | 35,623 | Sunday 19, August |

=== Round 21 ===
| Home team | Home team score | Away team | Away team score | Ground | Crowd | Date |
|---|---|---|---|---|---|---|
| North Melbourne | 27.17 (179) | St Kilda | 12.15 (87) | MCG | 18,079 | Friday 24, August |
| Hawthorn | 17.14 (116) | Carlton | 12.13 (85) | Princes Park | 23,200 | Saturday 25, August |
| Collingwood | 17.16 (118) | Fitzroy | 4.8 (32) | Victoria Park | 21,008 | Saturday 25, August |
| Essendon | 15.14 (104) | Footscray | 11.14 (80) | Windy Hill | 17,258 | Saturday 25, August |
| Geelong | 12.18 (90) | Sydney | 14.8 (92) | Kardinia Park | 13,109 | Saturday 25, August |
| Richmond | 7.8 (50) | Melbourne | 12.14 (86) | Waverley Park | 15,342 | Saturday 25, August |
| Brisbane Bears | 8.11 (59) | West Coast | 14.16 (100) | Carrara Stadium | 7,286 | Sunday 26, August |

=== Round 22 ===
| Home team | Home team score | Away team | Away team score | Ground | Crowd | Date |
|---|---|---|---|---|---|---|
| Fitzroy | 18.17 (125) | Carlton | 16.17 (113) | Princes Park | 14,168 | Saturday 1, September |
| North Melbourne | 8.19 (67) | Collingwood | 23.18 (156) | Waverley Park | 43,044 | Saturday 1, September |
| St Kilda | 13.15 (93) | Essendon | 19.14 (128) | Moorabbin Oval | 26,661 | Saturday 1, September |
| Footscray | 16.21 (117) | Brisbane Bears | 15.6 (96) | Whitten Oval | 11,371 | Saturday 1, September |
| Geelong | 12.11 (83) | West Coast | 14.6 (90) | Kardinia Park | 16,312 | Saturday 1, September |
| Melbourne | 17.14 (116) | Hawthorn | 15.14 (104) | MCG | 57,247 | Saturday 1, September |
| Sydney | 15.19 (109) | Richmond | 20.19 (139) | SCG | 7,180 | Sunday 2, September |

- The St Kilda-Essendon game was the only one in which all 4 Daniher brothers (Anthony, Terry, Neale, and Chris) played in the same match.

== Ladder ==
| (P) | Premiers |
| | Qualified for finals |

| # | Team | P | W | L | D | PF | PA | % | Pts |
|---|---|---|---|---|---|---|---|---|---|
| 1 | Essendon | 22 | 17 | 5 | 0 | 2526 | 1815 | 139.2 | 68 |
| 2 | Collingwood (P) | 22 | 16 | 6 | 0 | 2376 | 1825 | 130.2 | 64 |
| 3 | West Coast | 22 | 16 | 6 | 0 | 2274 | 1920 | 118.4 | 64 |
| 4 | Melbourne | 22 | 16 | 6 | 0 | 2339 | 2066 | 113.2 | 64 |
| 5 | Hawthorn | 22 | 14 | 8 | 0 | 2414 | 2002 | 120.6 | 56 |
| 6 | North Melbourne | 22 | 12 | 10 | 0 | 2519 | 2210 | 114.0 | 48 |
| 7 | Footscray | 22 | 12 | 10 | 0 | 2016 | 2031 | 99.3 | 48 |
| 8 | Carlton | 22 | 11 | 11 | 0 | 2277 | 2187 | 104.1 | 44 |
| 9 | St Kilda | 22 | 9 | 13 | 0 | 2328 | 2313 | 100.6 | 36 |
| 10 | Geelong | 22 | 8 | 14 | 0 | 2248 | 2398 | 93.7 | 32 |
| 11 | Richmond | 22 | 7 | 15 | 0 | 1988 | 2530 | 78.6 | 28 |
| 12 | Fitzroy | 22 | 7 | 15 | 0 | 1874 | 2389 | 78.4 | 28 |
| 13 | Sydney | 22 | 5 | 17 | 0 | 1904 | 2704 | 70.4 | 20 |
| 14 | Brisbane Bears | 22 | 4 | 18 | 0 | 1733 | 2426 | 71.4 | 16 |

Rules for classification: 1. premiership points; 2. percentage; 3. points for
Average score: 100.1
Source: AFL Tables

== Finals series ==
=== Finals week 1 ===
Elimination Final
Sunday, 9 September 2:30pm | Melbourne | def. | Hawthorn | MCG (crowd: 74,954)
1.2 (8); 3.6 (24); 9.10 (64); 10.13 (73) | Q1; Q2; Q3; Final | 2.6 (18); 4.7 (31); 5.10 (40); 8.16 (64) | Umpires: Carey, Sawers; Television broadcast: Seven Network
Bennett 4 Stretch 2 Eishold, Healy, Jackson, Spalding 1 | Goals | 2 Brereton, Dunstall, Hall; 1 Platten, Pritchard
Eishold, Stynes, Campbell, Yeats, Rohde, Newport, Healy | Best | Hall, Tuck, Mew, Pritchard

Qualifying Final
Saturday, 8 September 2:30pm | Collingwood | drew with | West Coast | Waverley Park (crowd: 57,546)
3.6 (24); 7.11 (53); 10.12 (72); 13.12 (90) | Q1; Q2; Q3; Final | 3.1 (19); 6.5 (41); 10.10 (70); 13.12 (90) | Umpires: Ball, Rich; Television broadcast: Seven Network
Daicos 4 Barwick, Brown 3 Taylor 2 Manson 1 | Goals | 4 Sumich; 2 Lewis, Heady, Langdon; 1 Kemp, Keene, Waterman
Brown, Wright, Francis, Millane, A. Richardson, Gayfer, Daicos | Best | Lewis, Heady, Lamb, Mainwaring, Hart, Langdon, Watters

Qualifying Final Replay
Saturday, 15 September 2:30pm | Collingwood | def. | West Coast | Waverley Park (crowd: 53,520)
8.1 (49); 12.6 (78); 14.9 (93); 19.12 (126) | Q1; Q2; Q3; Final | 2.1 (13); 4.5 (29); 9.9 (63); 9.13 (67) | Umpires: Mitchell, Sheehan; Television broadcast: Seven Network
Brown, Daicos 4 Manson, Crosisca, Francis 2 Kelly, Russell, McGuane, Christian, Millane 1 | Goals | 4 Sumich; 2 Keene; 1 Langdon, Turley, Kemp
Christian, Francis, Wright, Morwood, Brown, Gayfer, McGuane | Best | Turley, Sumich, Lamb, Keene, Worsfold, Lewis

=== Finals week 2 ===
First Semi-final
Saturday, 22 September 2:30pm | West Coast | def. | Melbourne | Waverley Park (crowd: 43,458)
4.2 (26); 10.5 (65); 16.10 (106); 19.16 (130) | Q1; Q2; Q3; Final | 2.1 (13); 2.8 (20); 8.9 (57); 15.10 (100) | Umpires: Sawers, Rich; Television broadcast: Seven Network
6 Waterman; 4 Sumich; 3 Jackson; 2 Mainwaring; 1 Lewis, Keene, Langdon, Kemp | Goals | Grinter 4 Bennett, Yeats, Jackson 2 Tingay, Campbell, Spalding, Healy, Eishold 1
Turley, Keene, Mainwaring, Waterman, McKenna, Jackson, Lewis | Best | B. Lovett, Spalding, Campbell, Eishold, Stynes, Grinter

Second Semi-final
Sunday, 23 September 2:30pm | Collingwood | def. | Essendon | MCG (crowd: 91,555)
4.5 (29); 7.7 (49); 12.8 (80); 17.15 (117) | Q1; Q2; Q3; Final | 2.3 (15); 5.7 (37); 7.10 (52); 7.12 (54) | Umpires: Carey, Sheehan; Television broadcast: Seven Network
Brown 5 Daicos, Barwick 3 Starcevich, Russell 2 Francis, Crosisca 1 | Goals | 3 Salmon; 1 Harvey, Kickett, Vander Haar, Thompson
McGuane, Brown, Banks, Morwood, Russell, Francis, Christian | Best | Salmon, T. Daniher, Thompson, Bewick, Ezard

=== Preliminary final ===
Preliminary Final
Saturday, 29 September 2:30pm | Essendon | def. | West Coast | Waverley Park (crowd: 55,813)
4.1 (25); 11.3 (69); 13.10 (88); 18.13 (121) | Q1; Q2; Q3; Final | 1.2 (8); 5.3 (33); 6.8 (44); 8.10 (58) | Umpires: Carey, Sheehan; Television broadcast: Seven Network
Ezard, Harvey 3 Salmon, Madden, Vander Haar 2 Anderson, Bewick, Kickett, Long, Manning, Watson 1 | Goals | 3 Jackson; 2 Sumich; 1 Heady, Langdon, Mainwaring
Madden, T. Daniher, Anderson, Grenvold, Ezard, Hamilton, Bewick | Best | Mainwaring, Lewis, Scott, Hart, Heady, Brennan, McKenna

=== Grand final ===
1990 AFL Grand Final
Saturday, 6 October 2:30pm | Collingwood | def. | Essendon | MCG (crowd: 98,944)
2.5 (17); 8.9 (57); 11.10 (76); 13.11 (89) | Q1; Q2; Q3; Final | 2.2 (14); 3.5 (23); 5.6 (36); 5.11 (41) | Umpires: Sawers, Rich; Norm Smith Medal: Tony Shaw; Television broadcast: Seven Network; National anthem: Normie Rowe
Brown 2, Barwick 2, Crosisca 2, Russell 2, Daicos 2, Monkhorst, Starcevich, McGuane | Goals | Salmon 2, Kickett, Somerville, Grenvold
Shaw, Russell, Monkhorst, Millane, Francis, Kerrison, Starcevich, Crosisca, McGuane | Best | Watson, Sporn, T. Daniher, Kickett, Ezard, O'Donnell
Brown (concussion), Starcevich (concussion) | Injuries | Nil
See Tribunal | Reports | See Tribunal

== Season notes ==
- The Victorian Football League (VFL) was renamed and re-badged, with a new logo, as the Australian Football League in 1990.
- VFL Park was re-designated as Waverley Park, although it took about two or three years for football commentators and sporting editors to stop using the old name for the ground.
- Prior to the season, it was announced that Fitzroy and Footscray – both in serious financial difficulty – would be merging to form a single club known as the Fitzroy Bulldogs, which was to have commenced in the AFL in 1990. Less than three weeks after the announcement, a successful grass-roots campaign by Footscray supporters restored their club to a position of financial viability, and the merger was cancelled.
- Five minutes into the third quarter of the Round 1 game between Geelong and Hawthorn, the Cats led the Hawks 10.6 (66) to 9.11 (65): Hawthorn then outscored Geelong 19.13 (127) to 1.5 (11) in the rest of the game to win by 115 points.
- Under the AFL rules at the time, the drawn qualifying final between Collingwood and West Coast was replayed on the following weekend. This meant that minor premier Essendon was given a second consecutive bye week, giving them three weeks between games: Essendon ultimately reached the grand final through the preliminary final, but they were soundly beaten in both the second semi-final and grand final, to which many laid partial blame upon the extended layoff. Additionally, the one-week delay caused scheduling issues for venues and hotels, as a large number of league and corporate events related to the finals, and particularly in the week of the grand final, had to be rescheduled: the extent of this was unprecedented, as the number and scale of such events had increased significantly since 1972, which was the last time an early weeks finals match had required a replay. The AFL introduced the provision to play extra time in drawn finals matches, except the grand final, in future years to prevent any repeat of these logistical problems; extra time was implemented in the grand final from 2016.
- The Port Adelaide Football Club from the South Australian National Football League made a bid to join the AFL; the application was rejected, with a composite SANFL team, christened the "Adelaide Crows", being admitted to the AFL competition in the 1991 season. Port Adelaide ultimately entered the competition in 1997.
- The Brisbane-Melbourne game in round 5 was the 10,000th VFL/AFL match.
- North Melbourne won the Under 19's premiership. North Melbourne 16.12 (108) defeated Melbourne 5.14 (44) in the Grand Final, held as a curtain-raiser to the reserves grand final on 6 October at the Melbourne Cricket Ground.
- Carlton won the reserves premiership. Carlton 14.14 (98) defeated Melbourne 11.15 (81) in the Grand Final, held as a curtain-raiser to the seniors grand final on 6 October at the Melbourne Cricket Ground.

== Awards ==
- The Brownlow Medal was awarded to Tony Liberatore of Footscray.
- The Coleman Medal was awarded to John Longmire of North Melbourne.
- The Norm Smith Medal was awarded to Tony Shaw of Collingwood
- The Leigh Matthews Trophy was awarded to Darren Millane of Collingwood
- The Wooden Spoon was "awarded" to Brisbane
- The Under 19's Grand Final was won by North Melbourne against Melbourne
- The Reserves Grand Final was won by Carlton against Melbourne
- The Seniors Grand Final was won by Collingwood against Essendon

== Sources ==
- 1990 AFL season at AFL Tables
- 1990 AFL season at Australian Football
