= 1999 TSFL season =

- Teams: 8
- Premiers: Glenorchy
- Minor premiers: Northern Bombers

Attendance
- Matches played: 68
- Total attendance: 86,347 (1,270 per match)

The 1999 TSFL season was the 115th season of the Tasmanian State Football League (TSFL), the highest-level senior Australian rules football competition in Tasmania. This was the first and only season under the TSFL name (also known as the Chickenfeed Super League because of a sponsorship agreement with Chickenfeed), replacing the TFL Statewide League name that had been used since 1986. The season began on 10 April and concluded on 18 September, comprising an 18-match home-and-away season, followed by a four-week finals series.

From this season the competition would be under the control of a new independent governing body of the sport in Tasmania named Football Tasmania as part of recommendations set down by the Australian Football League's Biggs Report investigation into the strong decline in interest and financial disarray of the TFL competition.

In December 1998 Football Tasmania was formed and in February 1999 the Tasmanian Football League was liquidated and the new governing body assumed control of the competition.

From this season North Hobart were rebranded as the Hobart Demons under a marketing arrangement with their major sponsor Harris Scarfe (formerly FitzGerald's) whilst New Norfolk were rebranded as the Derwent Eagles to reflect their entire region (Derwent Valley).

On 31 May, Southern Districts folded after just eighteen months due to ongoing financial difficulties and falling support whilst Derwent Eagles (New Norfolk) were excluded from the competition after this season for both financial and geographical reasons, they were paid a sum of money to leave the TSFL by Football Tasmania and joined the SFL the following season.

== Participating Clubs ==
- Burnie Dockers Football Club
- Clarence District Football Club
- Devonport Power Football Club
- Glenorchy District Football Club
- Derwent Eagles Football Club
- Hobart Demons Football Club
- Northern Bombers Football Club
- Southern Districts Football Club (Disbanded on 31 May 1999)

=== 1999 TSFL Club Coaches ===
- Darren Winter (Burnie Dockers)
- Dean Chiron (Clarence)
- Richard Spencer (Devonport Power)
- Paul Hamilton (Glenorchy)
- Andrew Dale (Derwent Eagles)
- Darryn Perry (Hobart Demons)
- Rod Hill (Northern Bombers)
- Troy Clarke (Southern Districts)

=== TSFL Reserves Grand Final ===
- Burnie Dockers 11.19 (85) v Northern Bombers 10.9 (69) – North Hobart Oval

=== TSFL Under-19's Grand Final ===
- Clarence 10.13 (73) v Devonport Power 5.6 (36) – North Hobart Oval

=== Interstate Matches ===
Interstate Match (Saturday, 19 June 1999)

- Western Australia 20.12 (132) v Tasmania 10.14 (74) – Att: 7,000 at Sir Richard Moore Sports Centre, Kalgoorlie

=== Leading Goalkickers: TFL Statewide League ===
- Adam Aherne (Northern Bombers) – 67
- Scott Allen (Clarence) – 51
- Mark Colegrave (Clarence) – 47
- Steane Kremerskothen (Northern Bombers) – 41

=== Medal Winners ===
- Ben Atkin (Glenorchy), Matthew Jones (Clarence) & Darren Trevena (Northern Bombers) – William Leitch Medal
- Ben Careless (Glenorchy) – Darrel Baldock Medal (Best player in TFL Grand Final)
- Stuart Beechey (Clarence) – George Watt Medal (Reserves)
- Jason Rigby (Hobart Demons) – V.A Geard Medal (Under-19's)

=== 1999 TSFL Ladder ===
Pos	Team	Pld	W	L	D	PF	PA	PP	Pts
1	Northern Bombers	18	16	2	0	2128	1003	212.2	64
2	Clarence	18	15	3	0	2178	1179	184.7	60
3	Glenorchy	18	13	5	0	1752	1238	141.5	52
4	Burnie Dockers	18	10	8	0	1518	1340	113.3	40
5	Hobart Demons	18	7	11	0	1376	1626	84.6	28
6	Derwent Eagles	18	7	11	0	1415	1851	76.4	28
7	Devonport Power	18	2	16	0	761	2821	27.0	8
8	Southern Districts (Note: Club folded, record expunged)	0	0	0	0	0	0	—	0 (Note: Southern Districts were wound up at a Football Tasmania meeting on 31 May and their record (2W 6L 0D 820 For 890 Against 92.13% Points 8) was expunged; each team that had already played them and those teams who had been drawn to play them for the rest of the season were awarded four premiership points.)

=== Round 1 ===
(Saturday, 10 April 1999)

- Burnie Dockers 16.10 (106) v Glenorchy 14.10 (94) – Att: 1,043 at KGV Football Park
- Derwent Eagles 17.9 (111) v Hobart Demons 13.15 (93) – Att: 1,087 at Boyer Oval
- Clarence 16.15 (111) v Northern Bombers 14.6 (90) – Att: 1,304 at York Park
- ~~Southern Districts 26.23 (179) v Devonport 7.9 (51) – Att: 773 at Devonport Oval~~

=== Round 2 ===
(Saturday, 17 April & Sunday, 18 April 1999)

- Clarence 19.14 (128) v Derwent Eagles 9.11 (65) – Att: 1,258 at Bellerive Oval
- Northern Bombers 24.20 (164) v Devonport 6.6 (42) – Att: 802 at Devonport Oval
- Burnie Dockers 16.17 (113) v Hobart Demons 10.13 (73) – Att: 1,159 at West Park Oval
- ~~Glenorchy 22.17 (149) v Southern Districts 12.15 (87) – Att: 1,458 at Huonville Recreation Ground (Sunday)~~

=== Round 3 ===
(Saturday, 24 April & Sunday, 25 April 1999)

- Glenorchy 23.12 (150) v Hobart Demons 14.12 (96) – Att: 1,353 at North Hobart Oval
- Clarence 27.23 (185) v Devonport 2.8 (20) – Att: 762 at Bellerive Oval
- Northern Bombers 10.11 (71) v Burnie Dockers 9.10 (64) – Att: 1,137 at York Park
- ~~Derwent Eagles 17.18 (120) v Southern Districts 15.11 (101) – Att: 858 at Huonville Recreation Ground (Sunday)~~

=== Round 4 ===
(Saturday, 1 May 1999)

- ~~Hobart Demons 15.16 (106) v Southern Districts 15.8 (98) – Att: 850 at North Hobart Oval~~
- Clarence 16.14 (110) v Glenorchy 9.10 (64) – Att: 1,367 at KGV Football Park
- Northern Bombers 20.11 (131) v Derwent Eagles 8.7 (55) – Att: 933 at Boyer Oval
- Burnie Dockers 21.19 (145) v Devonport 5.8 (38) – Att: 1,900 at West Park Oval

=== Round 5 ===
(Saturday, 8 May 1999)

- ~~Burnie Dockers 10.13 (73) v Southern Districts 8.11 (59) – Att: 691 at North Hobart Oval~~
- Clarence 14.16 (100) v Hobart Demons 10.6 (66) – Att: 1,066 at Bellerive Oval
- Northern Bombers 21.16 (142) v Glenorchy 8.12 (60) – Att: 806 at York Park
- Devonport 16.11 (107) v Derwent Eagles 9.13 (67) – Att: 712 at Devonport Oval

=== Round 6 ===
(Saturday, 15 May & Sunday, 16 May 1999)

- Northern Bombers 17.12 (114) v Hobart Demons 6.9 (45) – Att: 757 at North Hobart Oval
- Glenorchy 26.25 (181) v Devonport 6.5 (41) – Att: 974 at KGV Football Park
- Derwent Eagles 12.10 (82) v Burnie Dockers 10.12 (72) – Att: 933 at West Park Oval
- ~~Clarence 22.14 (146) v Southern Districts 11.12 (78) – Att: 866 at North Hobart Oval (Sunday)~~

=== Round 7 ===
(Saturday, 22 May & Sunday, 23 May 1999)

- Clarence 23.9 (147) v Burnie Dockers 12.10 (82) – Att: 1,064 at Bellerive Oval
- Glenorchy 17.16 (118) v Derwent Eagles 7.9 (51) – Att: 1,145 at Boyer Oval
- Hobart Demons 26.25 (181) v Devonport 3.4 (22) – Att: 738 at Devonport Oval
- ~~Northern Bombers 23.23 (161) v Southern Districts 6.3 (39) – Att: 872 at York Park (Sunday)~~

=== Round 8 ===
(Saturday, 29 May & Sunday, 30 May 1999)

- ~~Southern Districts 27.17 (179) v Devonport 13.6 (84) – Att: 447 at North Hobart Oval~~
- Northern Bombers 18.13 (121) v Clarence 12.7 (79) – Att: 3,534 at Bellerive Oval
- Glenorchy 7.6 (48) v Burnie Dockers 6.7 (43) – Att: 547 at West Park Oval
- Hobart Demons 17.10 (112) v Derwent Eagles 10.18 (78) – Att: 1,195 at North Hobart Oval (Sunday)

=== Round 9 ===
(Saturday, 5 June & Sunday, 6 June 1999)

- Burnie Dockers 11.15 (81) v Hobart Demons 10.7 (67) – Att: 917 at North Hobart Oval
- Clarence 17.9 (111) v Derwent Eagles 12.8 (80) – Att: 851 at Boyer Oval
- Northern Bombers 31.22 (208) v Devonport 3.5 (23) – Att: 600 at York Park (Sunday)
- Bye: Glenorchy (Four premiership points awarded).

=== Round 10 ===
(Saturday, 12 June & Sunday, 13 June 1999)

- Glenorchy 22.13 (145) v Hobart Demons 11.15 (81) – Att: 1,024 at KGV Football Park
- Clarence 30.15 (195) v Devonport 6.2 (38) – Att: 698 at Devonport Oval
- Burnie Dockers 12.6 (78) v Northern Bombers 8.11 (59) – Att: 1,137 at West Park Oval (Sunday)
- Bye: Derwent Eagles (Four premiership points awarded).

=== Round 11 ===
(Saturday, 26 June & Sunday, 27 June 1999)

- Clarence 11.10 (76) v Glenorchy 7.10 (52) – Att: 1,233 at Bellerive Oval
- Northern Bombers 29.16 (190) v Derwent Eagles 11.7 (73) – Att: 987 at York Park
- Burnie Dockers 33.14 (212) v Devonport 5.7 (37) – Att: 1,327 at Devonport Oval (Sunday)
- Bye: Hobart Demons (Four premiership points awarded).

=== Round 12 ===
(Saturday, 3 July & Sunday, 4 July 1999)

- Northern Bombers 10.10 (70) v Glenorchy 7.6 (48) – Att: 865 at KGV Football Park
- Derwent Eagles 26.17 (173) v Devonport 14.7 (91) – Att: 677 at Boyer Oval
- Clarence 15.11 (101) v Hobart Demons 8.4 (52) – Att: 1,254 at North Hobart Oval (Sunday)
- Bye: Burnie Dockers (Four premiership points awarded).

=== Round 13 ===
(Saturday, 10 July 1999)

- Derwent Eagles 25.6 (156) v Burnie Dockers 17.11 (113) – Att: 735 at Boyer Oval
- Northern Bombers 29.12 (186) v Hobart Demons 10.10 (70) – Att: 1,018 at York Park
- Glenorchy 28.18 (186) v Devonport 5.9 (39) – Att: 675 at Devonport Oval (Sunday)
- Bye: Clarence (Four premiership points awarded).

=== Round 14 ===
(Saturday, 17 July 1999)

- Hobart Demons 23.20 (158) v Devonport 4.8 (32) – Att: 529 at North Hobart Oval
- Glenorchy 19.7 (121) v Derwent Eagles 13.14 (92) – Att: 1,176 at KGV Football Park
- Clarence 18.8 (116) v Burnie Dockers 8.13 (61) – Att: 1,009 at West Park Oval
- Bye: Northern Bombers (Four premiership points awarded).

=== Round 15 ===
(Saturday, 24 July & Saturday, 31 July 1999)

- Hobart Demons 10.16 (76) v Derwent Eagles 10.13 (73) – Att: 848 at Boyer Oval (24 July)
- Northern Bombers 14.9 (93) v Clarence 14.8 (92) – Att: 2,740 at York Park (24 July)
- Glenorchy 11.12 (78) v Burnie Dockers 8.10 (58) – Att: 1,130 at KGV Football Park (31 July)
- Bye: Devonport (Four premiership points awarded).

=== Round 16 ===
(Saturday, 7 August & Sunday, 8 August 1999)

- Clarence 19.17 (131) v Derwent Eagles 9.10 (64) – Att: 1,233 at Bellerive Oval
- Burnie Dockers 13.12 (90) v Hobart Demons 9.12 (66) – Att: 1,052 at West Park Oval
- Northern Bombers 9.17 (71) v Devonport 3.2 (20) – Att: 585 at Devonport Oval (Sunday)
- Bye: Glenorchy (Four premiership points awarded).

=== Round 17 ===
(Saturday, 14 August 1999)

- Glenorchy 19.18 (132) v Hobart Demons 4.10 (34) – Att: 1,071 at North Hobart Oval
- Clarence 38.16 (244) v Devonport 4.4 (28) – Att: 502 at Bellerive Oval *
- Northern Bombers 13.24 (102) v Burnie Dockers 5.5 (35) – Att: 1,504 at York Park
- Bye: Derwent Eagles (Four premiership points awarded).

Note: Clarence Football Club kick their club record TFL score.

=== Round 18 ===
(Friday, 20 August & Saturday, 21 August 1999)

- Burnie Dockers 13.14 (92) v Devonport 9.8 (62) – Att: 1,598 at West Park Oval (Friday Night)
- Glenorchy 19.11 (125) v Clarence 17.10 (112) – Att: 1,312 at KGV Football Park
- Northern Bombers 24.12 (156) v Derwent Eagles 11.9 (75) – Att: 798 at Boyer Oval *
- Bye: Hobart Demons (Four premiership points awarded).

Note: The New Norfolk/Derwent Eagles' final TFL match and the final TFL match at Boyer Oval.

=== Qualifying Final ===
(Saturday, 28 August 1999)

- Glenorchy: 10.1 (61) | 14.4 (88) | 16.10 (106) | 22.14 (146)
- Clarence: 0.2 (2) | 5.5 (35) | 6.10 (46) | 11.12 (78)
- Attendance: 2,635 at North Hobart Oval

=== Elimination Final ===
(Sunday, 29 August 1999)

- Burnie Dockers: 1.4 (10) | 3.9 (27) | 8.12 (60) | 8.13 (61)
- Hobart Demons: 4.2 (26) | 5.3 (33) | 6.4 (40) | 8.6 (54)
- Attendance: 1,566 at Devonport Oval

=== Second Semi Final ===
(Saturday, 4 September 1999)

- Glenorchy Magpies: 4.1 (25) | 5.1 (31) | 5.3 (33) | 5.3 (33)
- Northern Bombers: 1.0 (6) | 1.3 (9) | 3.6 (24) | 3.8 (26)
- Attendance: 1,702 at York Park

=== First Semi Final ===
(Sunday, 5 September 1999)

- Clarence Roos: 5.2 (32) | 10.5 (65) | 10.7 (67) | 10.8 (68)
- Burnie Dockers: 1.4 (10) | 1.6 (12) | 4.10 (34) | 7.11 (53)
- Attendance: 1,254 at North Hobart Oval

=== Preliminary Final ===
(Sunday, 12 September 1999)

- Northern Bombers: 1.5 (11) | 4.5 (29) | 8.6 (54) | 12.16 (88)
- Clarence Roos: 4.2 (26) | 8.6 (54) | 11.8 (74) | 13.8 (86)
- Attendance: 2,791 at North Hobart Oval

=== Grand Final ===
(Saturday, 18 September 1999) (ABC-TV highlights: 1999 TSFL Grand Final)

- Glenorchy Magpies: 4.3 (27) | 6.5 (41) | 10.7 (67) | 15.9 (99)
- Northern Bombers: 3.5 (23) | 4.6 (30) | 6.9 (45) | 7.11 (53)
- Attendance: 8,053 at North Hobart Oval

Source: All scores and statistics courtesy of the Hobart Mercury, Launceston Examiner and North West Advocate publications.
