= Russell Richards =

Australian rules footballer

Personal information
- Full name: Russell Richards
- Nickname: Rhino
- Born: 30 March 1962 (age 64)
- Original team: Seymour (GVL)
- Height: 188 cm (6 ft 2 in)
- Weight: 89 kg (196 lb)
- Position: Utility

Playing career^{1}
Years	Club	Games (Goals)
1983–1987	Melbourne	81 (43)
- ^{1} Playing statistics correct to the end of 1987.

Russell Richards (born 30 March 1962) is a former Australian rules footballer who played for Melbourne in the Victorian Football League (VFL).

A utility player from Goulburn Valley League (GVL) club Seymour, Richards made his debut in round 1 during the 1983 season against Collingwood and played the first 19 games of the season to win the Best First Year Player award at Melbourne. Richards played 81 games for Melbourne kicking 43 goals and his last game was in the 1987 Elimination Final win against North Melbourne.
