= Graeme Yeats =

Australian rules footballer and coach

Personal information
- Born: 21 September 1964 (age 62)
- Original team: Prahran
- Height: 179 cm (5 ft 10 in)
- Weight: 78 kg (172 lb)

Playing career^{1}
Years	Club	Games (Goals)
1984–1995	Melbourne	182 (45)
- ^{1} Playing statistics correct to the end of 1995.

Graeme Yeats (born 21 September 1964) is a former Australian rules footballer who played for Melbourne in the VFL/AFL.

A skilful and consistent defender/wingman, Yeats played 182 games with Melbourne, including 13 finals and the 1988 VFL Grand Final. He later played VFA/VFL football for Springvale. In the 1996 VFL Grand Final, his mark on the goal-line and subsequent goal from a tight angle with 47 seconds remaining was the winning goal in Springvale's 3-point premiership win against Frankston.

Yeats later won a VFL premiership as coach with Sandringham. He then coached the Dandenong Stingrays in the TAC Cup Under 18's Competition. He stepped down from the role at the end of the 2013 season.

== Statistics ==
Legend
G	Goals	K	Kicks	D	Disposals	T	Tackles
B	Behinds	H	Handballs	M	Marks

Season	Team	No.	Games	Totals							Averages (per game)							Votes
Season	Team	No.	Games	G	B	K	H	D	M	T	G	B	K	H	D	M	T	Votes
1984	Melbourne	45	13	0	1	122	65	187	30	—N/a	0.0	0.1	9.4	5.0	14.4	2.3	—N/a	0
1985	Melbourne	8	10	1	2	74	39	113	10	—N/a	0.1	0.2	7.4	3.9	11.3	1.0	—N/a	0
1986	Melbourne	8	5	0	1	50	13	63	19	—N/a	0.0	0.2	10.0	2.6	12.6	3.8	—N/a	0
1987	Melbourne	8	23	8	13	320	92	412	92	30	0.3	0.6	13.9	4.0	17.9	4.0	1.3	3
1988	Melbourne	8	26	9	17	343	93	436	94	30	0.3	0.7	13.2	3.6	16.8	3.6	1.2	6
1989	Melbourne	8	16	8	11	174	57	231	46	16	0.5	0.7	10.9	3.6	14.4	2.9	1.0	0
1990	Melbourne	8	23	9	4	272	102	374	89	23	0.4	0.2	11.8	4.4	16.3	3.9	1.0	6
1991	Melbourne	8	15	4	1	181	60	241	47	20	0.3	0.1	12.1	4.0	16.1	3.1	1.3	1
1992	Melbourne	8	19	5	2	253	75	328	73	14	0.3	0.1	13.3	3.9	17.3	3.8	0.7	4
1993	Melbourne	8	7	1	0	65	24	89	17	4	0.1	0.0	9.3	3.4	12.7	2.4	0.6	0
1994	Melbourne	8	19	0	0	190	69	259	51	23	0.0	0.0	10.0	3.6	13.6	2.7	1.2	1
1995	Melbourne	8	6	0	0	21	7	28	7	4	0.0	0.0	3.5	1.2	4.7	1.2	0.7	0
Career			182	45	52	2065	696	2761	575	164	0.2	0.3	11.3	3.8	15.2	3.2	1.1	21
