= David Flintoff =

Australian rules footballer

Personal information
- Full name: David Flintoff
- Born: 11 January 1964 (age 62)
- Original team: Syndal-Tally Ho
- Height: 175 cm (5 ft 9 in)
- Weight: 74 kg (163 lb)
- Position: Rover

Playing career^{1}
Years	Club	Games (Goals)
1983	Hawthorn	1 (0)
1988–91	Melbourne	31 (20)
Total		32 (20)
- ^{1} Playing statistics correct to the end of 1991.

David Flintoff (born 11 January 1964) is a former Australian rules footballer who played with Hawthorn and Melbourne in the Victorian Football League (VFL).

Flintoff made just one appearance for Hawthorn in 1983 before leaving the VFL and joining Central District in South Australia. A rover, he returned to the league in 1988 when he was signed up by Melbourne and played from the interchange bench in the 1988 VFL Grand Final.

== Bibliography ==
- David Flintoff's playing statistics from AFL Tables
- Holmesby, Russell and Main, Jim (2007). The Encyclopedia of AFL Footballers. 7th ed. Melbourne: Bas Publishing.
