= Rod Grinter =

Australian rules footballer

Personal information
- Born: 26 May 1965 (age 61)
- Original team: Katandra
- Height: 182 cm (6 ft 0 in)
- Weight: 85 kg (187 lb)

Playing career^{1}
| Years | Club | Games (Goals) |
| 1985–1995 | Melbourne | 134 (57) |
- ^{1} Playing statistics correct to the end of 1995.

Rodney 'Balls' Grinter (born 26 May 1965) is a former Australian rules footballer who played for Melbourne in the VFL and AFL.

Grinter is most remembered for an incident in Round 2 of the 1988 VFL season when he punched Footscray defender Terry Wallace in the face, rendering Wallace unconscious. Both field umpires failed to report Grinter for the incident, but he received a six-week suspension for the incident after a VFL investigation. Later that season he appeared in Melbourne's losing Grand Final side against Hawthorn. He was also suspended for nine matches in 1990 following a number of incidents in a game against Richmond at the MCG.

Grinter was part of the famous finish to the 1987 Preliminary Final when Hawthorn defeated Melbourne with a goal kicked after the final siren. Melbourne led by 4 points with only a few seconds remaining when Grinter conceded a free kick to Gary Buckenara fifty metres from goal. As Grinter stood on the mark, his teammate Jim Stynes ran between him and Buckenara and the siren sounded. This resulted in a 15-metre penalty and brought the Hawthorn forward within range. Buckenara kicked the decisive goal (his 5th for the match) and eliminated Melbourne.

After playing most of his career in defence, Grinter was moved into the forward line in 1993 and rejuvenated his career kicking 21 goals. He managed only 9 games the following year, Grinter stayed on the list as a supplementary player in 1995 serving as reserves captain mentoring the younger players.

He was later employed by the Demons as a match-day runner.

Grinter was coach of New Norfolk in the Tasmanian Statewide Football League during the 1996, 1997 and 1998 seasons.

== Statistics ==
Legend
| G | Goals | K | Kicks | D | Disposals | T | Tackles |
| B | Behinds | H | Handballs | M | Marks |

| Season | Team | No. | Games | Totals | | | | | | | Averages (per game) | | | | | | |
| Season | Team | No. | Games | G | B | K | H | D | M | T | G | B | K | H | D | M | T |
|---|---|---|---|---|---|---|---|---|---|---|---|---|---|---|---|---|---|
| 1985 | Melbourne | 14 | 11 | 13 | 9 | 81 | 39 | 120 | 31 | 0 | 1.2 | 0.8 | 7.4 | 3.5 | 10.9 | 2.8 | 0.0 |
| 1986 | Melbourne | 14 | 11 | 9 | 10 | 96 | 45 | 141 | 40 | 0 | 0.8 | 0.9 | 8.7 | 4.1 | 12.8 | 3.6 | 0.0 |
| 1987 | Melbourne | 14 | 18 | 2 | 3 | 230 | 48 | 278 | 67 | 12 | 0.1 | 0.2 | 12.8 | 2.7 | 15.4 | 3.7 | 0.7 |
| 1988 | Melbourne | 14 | 19 | 0 | 4 | 169 | 72 | 241 | 48 | 25 | 0.0 | 0.2 | 8.9 | 3.8 | 12.7 | 2.5 | 1.3 |
| 1989 | Melbourne | 14 | 19 | 4 | 4 | 160 | 74 | 234 | 47 | 22 | 0.2 | 0.2 | 8.4 | 3.9 | 12.3 | 2.5 | 1.2 |
| 1990 | Melbourne | 14 | 13 | 5 | 2 | 103 | 48 | 151 | 36 | 17 | 0.4 | 0.2 | 7.9 | 3.7 | 11.6 | 2.8 | 1.3 |
| 1991 | Melbourne | 14 | 16 | 1 | 2 | 129 | 32 | 161 | 34 | 20 | 0.1 | 0.1 | 8.1 | 2.0 | 10.1 | 2.1 | 1.3 |
| 1992 | Melbourne | 14 | 3 | 0 | 0 | 29 | 8 | 37 | 8 | 4 | 0.0 | 0.0 | 9.7 | 2.7 | 12.3 | 2.7 | 1.3 |
| 1993 | Melbourne | 14 | 15 | 21 | 6 | 96 | 41 | 137 | 49 | 8 | 1.4 | 0.4 | 6.4 | 2.7 | 9.1 | 3.3 | 0.5 |
| 1994 | Melbourne | 14 | 9 | 2 | 0 | 44 | 16 | 60 | 9 | 7 | 0.2 | 0.0 | 4.9 | 1.8 | 6.7 | 1.0 | 0.8 |
| Career | | | 134 | 57 | 40 | 1137 | 423 | 1560 | 369 | 115 | 0.4 | 0.3 | 8.5 | 3.2 | 11.6 | 2.8 | 1.0 |
