= Danny Hughes =

Australian rules footballer

Personal information
- Born: 4 December 1963 (age 62)
- Original team: Port Adelaide (SANFL)
- Draft: No. 13, 1981 interstate draft
- Height: 189 cm (6 ft 2 in)
- Weight: 90 kg (198 lb)

Playing career^{1}
Years	Club	Games (Goals)
1981-83, 1991-93	Port Adelaide (SANFL)	130 (7)
1984–1990	Melbourne	124 (23)
1991	Adelaide	11 (1)
Total		265 (31)
- ^{1} Playing statistics correct to the end of 1991.

Career highlights
- 7× South Australia interstate representative; Keith 'Bluey' Truscott Medal: 1985; All-Australian: 1988; 2x Port Adelaide SANFL premiership player (1981, 1992)

Danny Hughes (born 4 December 1963) is a former professional Australian rules footballer who played for the Melbourne Football Club and Adelaide Football Club in the Australian Football League (AFL).

A fullback, Hughes was a premiership player with Port Adelaide prior to transferring to Melbourne. He was Melbourne's best and fairest winner in 1985 and represented South Australia at interstate football and was awarded All Australian selection for his performance in the 1988 Adelaide Bicentennial Carnival. He returned to South Australia in 1991 and played in Adelaide's inaugural AFL season but retired at year's end. He continued to play with Port Adelaide in the SANFL until 1993.

== Statistics ==
Legend
G	Goals	K	Kicks	D	Disposals	T	Tackles
B	Behinds	H	Handballs	M	Marks

Season	Team	No.	Games	Totals							Averages (per game)						
Season	Team	No.	Games	G	B	K	H	D	M	T	G	B	K	H	D	M	T
1984	Melbourne	10	11	2	2	74	33	107	23	—N/a	0.2	0.2	6.7	3.0	9.7	2.1	—N/a
1985	Melbourne	10	22	1	4	190	75	265	53	—N/a	0.0	0.2	8.6	3.4	12.0	2.4	—N/a
1986	Melbourne	10	15	6	2	154	56	210	47	—N/a	0.4	0.1	10.3	3.7	14.0	3.1	—N/a
1987	Melbourne	10	22	2	1	209	41	250	57	16	0.1	0.0	9.5	1.9	11.4	2.6	0.7
1988	Melbourne	10	18	1	0	141	33	174	36	19	0.1	0.0	7.8	1.8	9.7	2.0	1.1
1989	Melbourne	10	19	4	3	123	39	162	35	15	0.2	0.2	6.5	2.1	8.5	1.8	0.8
1990	Melbourne	10	17	7	2	119	43	162	33	17	0.4	0.1	7.0	2.5	9.5	1.9	1.0
1991	Adelaide	19	11	1	1	56	33	89	18	6	0.1	0.1	5.1	3.0	8.1	1.6	0.5
Career			135	24	15	1066	353	1419	302	73	0.2	0.1	7.9	2.6	10.5	2.2	0.8
