= Bret Bailey =

Australian rules footballer

Personal information
- Full name: Bret Bailey
- Born: 22 January 1964 (age 62)
- Original teams: St Peters, East Bentleigh
- Height: 182 cm (6 ft 0 in)
- Weight: 90 kg (198 lb)

Playing career^{1}
Years	Club	Games (Goals)
1984–1989	Melbourne	80 (39)
1990	Geelong	1 (0)
Total		81 (39)
- ^{1} Playing statistics correct to the end of 1990.

Bret Bailey (born 22 January 1964) is a former Australian rules footballer who played with Melbourne and Geelong in the Victorian/Australian Football League (VFL/AFL).

== Career ==
A utility player, Bailey was recruited to Melbourne from St Peters. He played in Melbourne's 1983 Under-19s premiership and was a member of another premiership team the following year, in the reserves.

Bailey had his best year at the club in 1987. He kicked the winning goal in the Panasonic Cup final and was the only Melbourne player to appear in all 25 league games that they played, which included three finals. His 486 disposals for the season was second only to Greg Healy at the club and he also kicked 20 goals.

In 1990 he made his way to Geelong, via the pre-season draft, but would only make one appearance for his new club.

Bailey was a dual premiership player at Sandringham, in 1992 and 1994.
