= Dean Chiron =

Australian rules footballer and coach

Personal information
- Full name: Dean Chiron
- Born: 27 March 1961 (age 65)
- Original team: Beaufort (Ballarat FL)
- Height: 180 cm (5 ft 11 in)
- Weight: 74 kg (163 lb)

Playing career^{1}
| Years | Club | Games (Goals) |
| 1983–84 | St Kilda | 19 (19) |
| 1986 | Footscray | 1 (1) |
| 1987–89 | Melbourne | 17 (1) |
| Total | | 37 (21) |
- ^{1} Playing statistics correct to the end of 1989.

Dean Chiron (born 27 March 1961) is a former Australian rules footballer who played with St Kilda, Footscray and Melbourne in the Victorian Football League (VFL) during the 1980s.

Chiron spent his early career up forward or in the centre and kicked 12 goals in his debut season. The Beaufort recruit kicked a career best six goals in a game against Sydney at Moorabbin Oval the following year. He then crossed to Footscray but could only manage one appearance in the seniors, against his next club Melbourne.

Transformed during his time at Melbourne to a tagger, Chiron took part in their 1987 finals campaign but was suspended from the Semi Final. He had been found guilty of striking Shaun Smith with his right elbow in the Elimination Final, where he had been given the role of tagging Phil Krakouer. He participated in the famous 1987 Preliminary Final where Gary Buckenara kicked a goal after the siren to eliminate Melbourne. They went one better the following season and made the Grand Final but Chiron didn't play past round 17.

Chiron, who competes in Ironman Triathlon events, coached Clarence in the 1999 TSFL season.
