= Chris Wittman =

Australian rules footballer

Personal information
- Born: 30 August 1965 (age 61)
- Original team: Xavier College
- Height: 180 cm (5 ft 11 in)
- Weight: 80 kg (176 lb)

Playing career^{1}
| Years | Club | Games (Goals) |
| 1986–1992 | Hawthorn | 89 (61) |
| 1993 | St Kilda | 9 (0) |
| Total | | 98 (61) |
- ^{1} Playing statistics correct to the end of 1993.

Career highlights
- 2-time VFL/AFL premiership player (1988 and 1989)

Chris Wittman (born 30 August 1965) is a former Australian rules footballer who played with Hawthorn and St Kilda in the VFL/AFL.

Originally from Xavier College, Wittman played mostly as a rover for Hawthorn. He kicked 33 goals in 1988 and played in their premiership side that year. However, he broke his arm early in the game and took no further part. He finished as a premiership player again the following season. After not getting enough games due to the strength of Hawthorn during the early 1990s, he was traded to St Kilda, where he spent his final season.
