= Sean Wight =

Australian rules footballer (1964–2011)

Personal information
- Full name: John Phillip Wight
- Born: 15 March 1964; Glasgow, Scotland
- Died: 30 June 2011 (aged 47); East Melbourne, Victoria, Australia
- Original team: Listowel Emmets (club)/ Kerry (county team)
- Height: 185 cm (6 ft 1 in)
- Weight: 85 kg (187 lb)
- Position: Defender

Playing career^{1}
Years	Club	Games (Goals)
1984–1995	Melbourne	150 (63)
- ^{1} Playing statistics correct to the end of 1995.

Career highlights
- Melbourne Hall of Fame; VFL Team of the Year (1987); Victorian representative (1988)

John Phillip "Sean" Wight (15 March 1964 – 30 June 2011) was an Irish-Australian Australian rules footballer in the VFL/AFL.

He is a member of the Melbourne Football Club Hall of Fame and was named as one of the 150 Heroes of the club during the club's 150th celebrations.

The 185 cm tall, 85 kg Wight played for the Melbourne Football Club between 1985 and 1995, playing 150 games and scoring 63 goals. He is not only the first player to be associated with the Irish experiment but also considered to be one of its most successful products.

== Early life ==
Wight was born in Glasgow Scotland to mother Peggy of Listowel and Scottish father John. As a 13 year old Sean moved with his family to his mother's native Listowel in Ireland in 1978 where he was raised in where he took up gaelic football.

He played Gaelic football with the Kerry minor (Under-18) team which reached the final of the 1982 All-Ireland Minor Football Championship and with the Listowel Emmets club – the same club as Tadhg Kennelly.

Wight was scouted by the Melbourne Football Club's Ron Barassi and Barry Richardson on a visit to Ireland in 1982 as having the potential to play Australian rules football.

Wight was brought to Australia in 1983. He was part of an Under 19 VFL premiership side just weeks after his arrival from Ireland in 1983 and was widely hailed for his rapid conversion, though others who joined him from Ireland had much less success.

== VFL/AFL career ==
Wight made his VFL debut in 1985 and became a regular backline player, recognisable with his trademark moustache.

Wight played in two Demons night premiership–winning sides, in 1987 and 1989.

He began to develop a reputation as a dour defender, with an exceptional ability to not only spoil opponents marking attempts, but take high marks himself.

Wight, along with fellow Irish recruit Jim Stynes, was a member of Melbourne's 1988 VFL Grand Final team which lost to Hawthorn.

Retiring in 1995, Wight's career was somewhat overshadowed by Stynes, whose career in the midfield earned more accolades and media attention.

== Death ==
Wight died of lung cancer on 30 June 2011 after a short illness.

== See also ==
- List of overseas-born AFL players
- Irish Experiment
