= Simon Eishold =

Australian rules footballer

Personal information
- Full name: Simon Eishold
- Born: 26 March 1967 (age 59)
- Original team: Ormond (VAFA)
- Height: 186 cm (6 ft 1 in)
- Weight: 87 kg (192 lb)
- Position: Centreman

Playing career^{1}
| Years | Club | Games (Goals) |
| 1986–92 | Melbourne | 77 (50) |
| 1993 | Richmond | 5 (0) |
| Total | | 82 (50) |
- ^{1} Playing statistics correct to the end of 1993.

Simon Eishold (born 26 March 1967) is a former Australian rules footballer who played with Melbourne and Richmond in the Victorian/Australian Football League (VFL/AFL).

Eishold, a centreman, came from Ormond Amateurs and is perhaps best remembered for a missed shot at goal late in the last quarter of the 1987 Preliminary Final after marking in the goal square against Hawthorn's Peter Schwab. A goal would likely have booked Melbourne's spot in the Grand Final and Eishold, who came in from an angle, pull his kick wide. Hawthorn would go on to win the match with a goal after the siren, following Jim Stynes giving away a 15-metre penalty.

Melbourne made the Grand Final the following season, but Eishold didn't take part after making only seven appearances all year. He had his best season in 1990, with 16.40 disposals on average a game and 22 goals.

He was set to move to Tasmania in 1993 to take up the position of Hobart's senior coach, but when that failed to eventuate he was picked up by Richmond with the 51st pick of the 1993 Pre-Season Draft. Back under his old Melbourne coach, John Northey, Eishold could only manage to add a further four games to his AFL tally.

Eishold then played with and coached Echuca in the Goulburn Valley Football League. He won a Morrison Medal in 1995 as the league's best player and was the coach of the 1997 Echuca premiership team. After his football career ended, Eishold remained in Echuca as a property valuer.
