= Darren Steele =

Australian rules footballer

Personal information
- Full name: Darren Steele
- Nickname: Kinko
- Born: 13 April 1966 (age 60)
- Original team: Wangaratta
- Height: 183 cm (6 ft 0 in)
- Weight: 83 kg (183 lb)

Playing career^{1}
Years	Club	Games (Goals)
1984–1992	North Melbourne	119 (31)
1993–1994	Geelong	18 (7)
Total		137 (38)
- ^{1} Playing statistics correct to the end of 1994.

Darren Steele (born 13 April 1966) is a former Australian rules footballer who played with North Melbourne and Geelong in the Australian Football League (AFL).

Steele spent nine seasons playing VFL football at North Melbourne, after arriving at the club from Wangaratta. He was a defender and utility, also used as a tagger. At the end of the 1992 season, he was traded to Geelong, along with Leigh Tudor and Liam Pickering.
