= Steven Stretch =

Australian rules footballer

Personal information
- Born: 5 January 1964 (age 62)
- Original team: West Torrens (SANFL)
- Height: 184 cm (6 ft 0 in)
- Weight: 81 kg (179 lb)

Playing career^{1}
| Years | Club | Games (Goals) |
| 1986–1993 | Melbourne | 164 (71) |
| 1994–1995 | Fitzroy | 25 (7) |
| Total | | 189 (78) |
- ^{1} Playing statistics correct to the end of 1995.

Career highlights
- Keith 'Bluey' Truscott Medal: 1987; State Representative for South Australia 1987, 1988, 1989.

Steven Stretch (born 5 January 1964) is a former Australian rules footballer who played for Melbourne and Fitzroy in the VFL/AFL and West Torrens in the South Australian National Football League (SANFL).

A wingman, Stretch won the 1987 Keith 'Bluey' Truscott Trophy for the Demons' best and fairest player. Stretch also played in 13 finals for the Demons including the 1988 VFL Grand Final. In 1994 he was traded to Fitzroy in the pre-season draft and played his final two seasons at the club.

Steven's son Billy played for the Demons after being drafted in 2014 under the father-son rule.

== Playing statistics ==
Legend
| G | Goals | K | Kicks | D | Disposals | T | Tackles |
| B | Behinds | H | Handballs | M | Marks |

| Season | Team | No. | Games | Totals | | | | | | | Averages (per game) | | | | | | |
| Season | Team | No. | Games | G | B | K | H | D | M | T | G | B | K | H | D | M | T |
|---|---|---|---|---|---|---|---|---|---|---|---|---|---|---|---|---|---|
| 1986 | Melbourne | 18 | 18 | 4 | 6 | 191 | 64 | 255 | 64 | —N/a | 0.2 | 0.3 | 10.6 | 3.6 | 14.2 | 3.6 | —N/a |
| 1987 | Melbourne | 18 | 24 | 9 | 7 | 345 | 95 | 440 | 90 | 34 | 0.4 | 0.3 | 14.4 | 4.0 | 18.3 | 3.8 | 1.4 |
| 1988 | Melbourne | 18 | 26 | 5 | 9 | 423 | 78 | 501 | 105 | 23 | 0.2 | 0.3 | 16.3 | 3.0 | 19.3 | 4.0 | 0.9 |
| 1989 | Melbourne | 18 | 22 | 11 | 5 | 355 | 74 | 429 | 85 | 24 | 0.5 | 0.2 | 16.1 | 3.4 | 19.5 | 3.9 | 1.1 |
| 1990 | Melbourne | 18 | 23 | 8 | 8 | 327 | 71 | 398 | 67 | 46 | 0.3 | 0.3 | 14.2 | 3.1 | 17.3 | 2.9 | 2.0 |
| 1991 | Melbourne | 18 | 19 | 3 | 7 | 255 | 65 | 320 | 64 | 26 | 0.2 | 0.4 | 13.4 | 3.4 | 16.8 | 3.4 | 1.4 |
| 1992 | Melbourne | 18 | 18 | 14 | 7 | 227 | 47 | 274 | 72 | 23 | 0.8 | 0.4 | 12.6 | 2.6 | 15.2 | 4.0 | 1.3 |
| 1993 | Melbourne | 18 | 14 | 17 | 5 | 149 | 68 | 217 | 32 | 12 | 1.2 | 0.4 | 10.6 | 4.9 | 15.5 | 2.3 | 0.9 |
| 1994 | Fitzroy | 22 | 19 | 5 | 4 | 188 | 104 | 292 | 63 | 43 | 0.3 | 0.2 | 9.9 | 5.5 | 15.4 | 3.3 | 2.3 |
| 1995 | Fitzroy | 22 | 6 | 2 | 2 | 47 | 18 | 65 | 15 | 10 | 0.3 | 0.3 | 7.8 | 3.0 | 10.8 | 2.5 | 1.7 |
| Career | | | 189 | 78 | 60 | 2507 | 684 | 3191 | 657 | 241 | 0.4 | 0.3 | 13.3 | 3.6 | 16.9 | 3.5 | 1.4 |
