= Warren Dean (footballer) =

Australian rules footballer

Personal information
- Full name: Warren Frank Dean
- Born: 9 March 1964 (age 62)
- Original team: Subiaco
- Height: 188 cm (6 ft 2 in)
- Weight: 83 kg (183 lb)
- Position: Forward

Playing career^{1}
Years	Club	Games (Goals)
1987–89	Melbourne	32 (25)
- ^{1} Playing statistics correct to the end of 1989.

Warren Frank Dean (born 9 March 1964) is a former Australian rules footballer who played for Melbourne in the Victorian Football League (VFL) during the late 1980s.

A forward from Subiaco, Dean played 19 games with Melbourne in 1987. He featured prominently in the Elimination Final win over North Melbourne with three goals and four behinds. Dean also appeared in Melbourne's losing Preliminary Final team which missed out on the premiership decider when Jim Stynes gave away a free kick in the dying seconds. At times inaccurate in front of goals, he kicked six behinds for no goals in a game against Sydney the following season. He was a Western Australian State of Origin representative and played in the 1988 Adelaide Bicentennial Carnival.

Dean was traded to West Coast in the 1990 Preseason Draft but could not break into their seniors.

== Bibliography ==
- Holmesby, Russell; Main, Jim (2007). The Encyclopedia of AFL Footballers. 7th ed. Melbourne: Bas Publishing.
