= Tony Campbell (footballer) =

Australian rules footballer and businessman

Personal information
- Full name: Anthony Campbell
- Born: 13 August 1967 (age 59)
- Height: 189 cm (6 ft 2 in)
- Weight: 93 kg (205 lb)
- Position: Fullback

Playing career^{1}
Years	Club	Games (Goals)
1986–1991	Melbourne	75 (61)
1992–1993, 1996	Footscray	43 (4)
Total		118 (65)
- ^{1} Playing statistics correct to the end of 1996.

Anthony 'Tony' Campbell (born 13 August 1967) is a former professional Australian rules footballer and businessman.

== AFL career ==
Campbell was recruited to the Melbourne Football Club from Camberwell Grammar School. Early in his career, the solidly built player was tried on the full-forward line wearing the number 40 and later 4 guernseys for Melbourne. Despite kicking some long goals, his questionable accuracy led to him being used instead at fullback where he settled in his career, becoming an uncompromising long and direct kicking defender.

During a time of little success he requested a pre-draft trade at the end of 1991 that would find him at Footscray.

Campbell became a cult hero for many Bulldogs fans, known for wearing a long sleeved jumper and gloves. He created some controversy when he created a business selling sporting gloves and tried to promote them as a fashion in the AFL.

Campbell was one of the few players of his era (along with Alastair Lynch) who matched up well with Tony Lockett. Lockett would rarely beat Campbell in a man on man contest to the death. In 1994, with the intention of gaining membership in the Fremantle Dockers’ squad for 1995, Campbell moved to play for Perth, but played only one match before an Achilles tendon injury required season-ending surgery.

== American Football ==
Campbell surprised many when he quit Australian football to move to the United States and follow Darren Bennett in the pursuit of big money as an American football punter. However, after trialling for a season he was not offered a contract.

== Return to the AFL ==
Having gone missing for two seasons he eventually returned to Australia and announced his intention to once again play Australian rules football. The Bulldogs traded Luke Beveridge to get pick #54 in the 1995 AFL draft which they used to re-draft Campbell. He played one final season in the league before retiring at the end of 1996.
