= John Kennedy Jr. (footballer) =

Australian rules footballer

Personal information
- Full name: John James Kennedy Jr.
- Born: 22 November 1959 (age 66)
- Original team: De La Salle (VAFA)
- Debut: Round 6, 1979, Hawthorn vs. Carlton, at Princes Park
- Height: 190 cm (6 ft 3 in)
- Weight: 91 kg (201 lb)

Playing career^{1}
Years	Club	Games (Goals)
1979–1991	Hawthorn	241 (211)
- ^{1} Playing statistics correct to the end of 1991.

Career highlights
- 4× VFL premiership player (1983, 1986, 1988, 1989); Hawthorn Hall of Fame

John James Kennedy Jr. (born 22 November 1959) is a former Australian rules footballer, the son of former Hawthorn footballer, coach John Kennedy Sr. and the father of Josh Kennedy, who played for Hawthorn and the Sydney Swans.

Kennedy was a four-time premiership player for Hawthorn. In 1993, Kennedy was appointed as assistant coach to Peter Knights at the Hawks. In 1995, Kennedy was elected to the board of directors of the Hawthorn Football Club. He is no longer a member.

Kennedy played a total of 241 games for Hawthorn, placing him 11th in the list of the most club matches in Hawthorn history at the end of the 2005 season.

Kennedy supported the planned merger between Hawthorn and Melbourne in 1996.

Kennedy is also of an Italian descent through his maternal grandparents.
