= Mark Colegrave =

Australian cricket player

Personal information
- Full name: Mark David Colegrave
- Born: 1 July 1968 (age 58); Hobart, Tasmania, Australia
- Batting: Right-handed
- Bowling: Right-arm fast-medium

Domestic team information
- Years: Team
- 2000/01: Tasmania

Career statistics
Competition	First-class
Matches	1
Runs scored	6
Batting average	6.00
100s/50s	0/0
Top score	5
Balls bowled	202
Wickets	1
Bowling average	131.00
5 wickets in innings	0
10 wickets in match	0
Best bowling	1/76
Catches/stumpings	0/–
- Source: CricketArchive, 15 August 2010

Mark David Colegrave (born 1 July 1968) is an Australian cricketer who played for Tasmania in the 2000–01 season. Colegrave is a talented fast bowler who excelled in the Tasmanian Grade Cricket competition, but never managed to properly break into the Tigers team.

Colegrave was born at Hobart and was also a champion Australian rules footballer who played in the Tasmanian Football League for both the Hobart Tigers from 1988 to 1997 and later the Clarence Football Club from 1998 to 2000, playing in Hobart's 1990 premiership team and finishing his career with a premiership with Clarence in 2000.
