= Brett Lovett =

Australian rules footballer and coach

Personal information
- Full name: Brett Lovett
- Born: 20 May 1966 (age 60)
- Original team: Inverloch
- Height: 180 cm (5 ft 11 in)
- Weight: 92 kg (203 lb)
- Position: Half back

Playing career^{1}
Years	Club	Games (Goals)
1986–1997	Melbourne	235 (48)
- ^{1} Playing statistics correct to the end of 1997.

Career highlights
- Melbourne Hall of Fame; 3x VFL Team of the Year: 1988, 1989, 1990

Brett Lovett (born 20 May 1966) is a former Australian rules footballer who played for the Melbourne Football Club in the Australian Football League (AFL). He also represented Victoria on six occasions.

Recruited from Inverloch, Lovett played at half back for the Demons from 1986 until 1997. After retiring, he went on to coach Frankston in the Victorian Football League (VFL) from 2003 to 2008.

Lovett was appointed coach of Sandringham, also a VFL side, in October 2010.

Sandringham and Lovett parted ways in October 2011 when Sandringham decided to return to a full-time coaching position.

Lovett was appointed coach of fellow VFL club, Casey on 14 November 2011.

== Statistics ==
Legend
G	Goals	K	Kicks	D	Disposals	T	Tackles
B	Behinds	H	Handballs	M	Marks

Season	Team	No.	Games	Totals							Averages (per game)						
Season	Team	No.	Games	G	B	K	H	D	M	T	G	B	K	H	D	M	T
1986	Melbourne	50	8	0	2	74	52	126	18	—N/a	0.0	0.3	9.3	6.5	15.8	2.3	—N/a
1987	Melbourne	17	16	1	3	161	79	240	63	17	0.1	0.2	10.1	4.9	15.0	3.9	1.1
1988	Melbourne	17	26	2	3	288	183	471	122	35	0.1	0.1	11.1	7.0	18.1	4.7	1.3
1989	Melbourne	17	24	1	2	282	206	488	111	39	0.0	0.1	11.8	8.6	20.3	4.6	1.6
1990	Melbourne	17	24	7	8	318	189	507	103	35	0.3	0.3	13.3	7.9	21.1	4.3	1.5
1991	Melbourne	17	24	4	3	258	175	433	95	48	0.2	0.1	10.8	7.3	18.0	4.0	2.0
1992	Melbourne	17	20	4	4	245	129	374	70	28	0.2	0.2	12.3	6.5	18.7	3.5	1.4
1993	Melbourne	17	18	0	3	190	142	332	59	11	0.0	0.2	10.6	7.9	18.4	3.3	0.6
1994	Melbourne	17	25	14	3	296	241	537	96	34	0.6	0.1	11.8	9.6	21.5	3.8	1.4
1995	Melbourne	17	12	2	2	126	75	201	38	16	0.2	0.2	10.5	6.3	16.8	3.2	1.3
1996	Melbourne	17	20	9	6	180	212	392	86	22	0.5	0.3	9.0	10.6	19.6	4.3	1.1
1997	Melbourne	17	18	4	4	135	110	245	61	10	0.2	0.2	7.5	6.1	13.6	3.4	0.6
Career			235	48	43	2553	1793	4346	922	295	0.2	0.2	10.9	7.6	18.5	3.9	1.3
