= David Williams (Australian rules footballer) =

Australian rules footballer

Personal information
- Full name: David Williams
- Born: 26 October 1961 (age 65)
- Original team: Rochester
- Height: 182 cm (6 ft 0 in)
- Weight: 87 kg (192 lb)
- Position: Forward

Playing career^{1}
Years	Club	Games (Goals)
1983–84, 1986–88	Melbourne	67 (102)
- ^{1} Playing statistics correct to the end of 1988.

David Williams (born 26 October 1961) is a former Australian rules footballer who played for Melbourne in the Victorian Football League (VFL).

A forward from Rochester, Williams kicked nine goals against North Melbourne late in the 1986 VFL season at the Melbourne Cricket Ground. He however had his most successful season in 1987 when he kicked 39 goals and he bagged 33 more the following year. The second of those tallies included two of Melbourne's six goals in the 1988 VFL Grand Final, which he played as a half forward flanker. It was his last game for the club and he was traded to Richmond, but a knee injury ended his career.
