= Steane Kremerskothen =

Australian rules footballer

Steane Kremerskothen is a former Australian rules football player from Tasmania, Australia.

Kremerskothen holds the games record at the top level of regional/statewide football in Tasmania, with 352 games (49 games for Launceston, 61 with Clarence, and 242 with North Launceston). Kremerskothen was the captain of the North Launceston team that won the 1995 TFL Statewide League Grand Final.
