= Greg Healy =

Australian rules footballer

Personal information
- Born: 16 September 1965 (age 61)
- Original team: Edithdale-Aspendale
- Height: 176 cm (5 ft 9 in)
- Weight: 75 kg (165 lb)

Playing career^{1}
Years	Club	Games (Goals)
1984–1993	Melbourne	141 (167)
- ^{1} Playing statistics correct to the end of 1993.

Career highlights
- Keith 'Bluey' Truscott Medallist: 1986; Melbourne leading goalkicker: 1986; Melbourne captain: 1988–1990; Melbourne Hall of Fame; Morrish Medal: 1983

Greg Healy (born 16 September 1965) is a former Australian rules footballer who played for Melbourne in the VFL/AFL. His brother Gerard was a Brownlow Medallist.

"Sugar" Healy's rise to the senior ranks at Melbourne were helped when he won the 1983 Morrish Medal for the season's best player in the VFL's Under-19 competition. A rover, he made his debut for the Demons the following season and in 1986 won their best and fairest award and topped their goalkicking. In 1988 he was appointed Melbourne's youngest ever captain at just 22 years of age. In his first year in charge he led the club to their first Grand Final since 1964, but they were defeated by Hawthorn.

Healy gave up the captaincy to Garry Lyon at the end of 1990. He suffered a season ending knee injury in round 3 against St Kilda in 1991 which resulted in a knee reconstruction. Healy returned and played on for the next two years, spending the majority of 1993 in the reserves, where he was part of the reserves 1993 premiership. He was delisted at the end of the 1993 season and was left unselected in the 1993 AFL draft.

== Playing statistics ==
Legend
G	Goals	K	Kicks	D	Disposals	T	Tackles
B	Behinds	H	Handballs	M	Marks

Season	Team	No.	Games	Totals							Averages (per game)						
Season	Team	No.	Games	G	B	K	H	D	M	T	G	B	K	H	D	M	T
1984	Melbourne	33	16	25	24	230	63	293	63	—N/a	1.6	1.5	14.4	3.9	18.3	3.9	—N/a
1985	Melbourne	33	7	7	5	83	27	110	32	—N/a	1.0	0.7	11.9	3.9	15.7	4.6	—N/a
1986	Melbourne	33	17	35	24	290	106	396	68	—N/a	2.1	1.4	17.1	6.2	23.3	4.0	—N/a
1987	Melbourne	33	23	29	27	347	181	528	90	41	1.3	1.2	15.1	7.9	23.0	3.9	1.8
1988	Melbourne	33	22	13	16	318	157	475	81	36	0.6	0.7	14.5	7.1	21.6	3.7	1.6
1989	Melbourne	33	21	24	22	311	177	488	90	29	1.1	1.1	14.8	8.4	23.2	4.3	1.4
1990	Melbourne	33	13	11	7	162	104	266	46	14	0.8	0.5	12.5	8.0	20.5	3.5	1.1
1991	Melbourne	33	3	4	7	47	12	59	9	0	1.3	2.3	15.7	4.0	19.7	3.0	0.0
1992	Melbourne	33	11	9	7	119	89	208	40	10	0.8	0.6	10.8	8.1	18.9	3.6	0.9
1993	Melbourne	33	8	10	7	69	64	133	20	6	1.3	0.9	8.6	8.0	16.6	2.5	0.8
Career			141	167	146	1976	980	2956	539	136	1.2	1.0	14.0	7.0	21.0	3.8	1.3
