= Stephen Newport =

Australian rules footballer

Personal information
- Full name: Stephen Newport
- Born: 5 November 1965 (age 60)
- Original team: Dingley / Caulfield Grammar
- Height: 182 cm (6 ft 0 in)
- Weight: 80 kg (176 lb)
- Position: Tagger

Playing career^{1}
Years	Club	Games (Goals)
1985–1990	Melbourne	101 (58)
1991–1993	St Kilda	39 (8)
Total		140 (66)
- ^{1} Playing statistics correct to the end of 1993.

Stephen Newport (born 5 November 1965) is a former Australian rules footballer who played with Melbourne and St Kilda in the Australian Football League (AFL).

After missing out on a Grand Final appearance in 1987, when Gary Buckenara kicked a goal after the siren to win Hawthorn the Preliminary Final, but he got his chance the following season when he was a half back flanker in the premiership decider. Newport then had a particularly good year in 1989 when he managed 10 votes in the Brownlow Medal count, joining Jim Stynes as the club's leading vote getter for the season. In the same year he represented Victoria in a match against Tasmania.

In the 1990 AFL draft, Newport was traded to St Kilda, in a deal which allowed Allen Jakovich to join Melbourne.

== See also ==
- List of Caulfield Grammar School people
