= Ricky Jackson (Australian footballer) =

Australian

Personal information
- Full name: Ricky Jackson
- Born: 19 June 1967 (age 59)
- Original team: Dandenong West
- Height: 170 cm (5 ft 7 in)
- Weight: 71 kg (157 lb)
- Position: Rover

Playing career^{1}
Years	Club	Games (Goals)
1986–91	Melbourne	80 (131)
- ^{1} Playing statistics correct to the end of 1991.

Career highlights
- Melbourne leading goalkicker, 1988

Ricky Jackson (born 19 June 1967) is a former Australian rules footballer who played for Melbourne in the Victorian Football League/Australian Football League (VFL/AFL).

Jackson tried out initially at Richmond but the rover was not wanted by the club due to his size. Despite this rejection, he had a successful career with Melbourne where he became a handy goal scorer and topped their goal-kicking in 1988 with 43 goals. Most notably he kicked five goals in Melbourne's Preliminary Final win over Carlton that year, although he went goal-less from the forward pocket in their Grand Final loss.

A Victorian interstate representative, Jackson was picked up by Footscray in the 1991 AFL draft but did not break into their seniors. He represented Australia in the 1990 International Rules series.
