= Russell Greene =

Australian rules footballer

Personal information
- Born: 30 May 1957 (age 69)
- Original team: Frankston Peninsula
- Debut: Round 1, 1974, St Kilda vs. Fitzroy, at Moorabbin Oval
- Height: 185 cm (6 ft 1 in)
- Weight: 78 kg (172 lb)
- Position: Utility

Playing career^{1}
Years	Club	Games (Goals)
1974–1980	St Kilda	120 (52)
1980–1988	Hawthorn	184 (82)
Total		304 (134)
- ^{1} Playing statistics correct to the end of 1988.

Career highlights
- 3× VFL premiership player: 1983, 1986, 1988; VFLPA MVP: 1984; Peter Crimmins Perpetual Memorial Trophy: 1984; All-Australian team: 1983, 1984, 1985; Hawthorn Hall of Fame: 2005; VFL Team of the Year: 1983, 1984; AFL Life member; HFC Life member; Victorian State of Origin Captain; Australian Sports Medal; Haydn Bunton Medal; 1982 Best Clubman; 1983 Best Team player and dedicated award and Best Team mate; 1985 1987 1988 Best Team mate

Russell Greene (born 30 May 1957) is a former Australian rules footballer who played for the St Kilda Football Club and Hawthorn Football Club in the Victorian Football League (VFL).

He was just sixteen when he made his VFL debut in round 1, 1974 for St Kilda. After playing eight games with St Kilda in 1980, he joined Hawthorn for the rest of that season and was a key player during a successful decade for the club. He won the VFL Players Association Most Valuable Player award, now known as the Leigh Matthews Trophy, as well as Hawthorn's best and fairest honours in 1984. Greene was chosen in the All-Australian team in 1983, 1984 and 1985. Greene's last game was the 1988 grand final win over Melbourne.

Greene has been involved at a few different clubs over the years, in 1994 at North Melbourne, Greene was the fitness advisor, a position he also held in 1997 at St. Kilda.

Since retiring from football, Greene has worked as a PE teacher, first at Melbourne Grammar School, and currently (2011 – present) at Marnebek School in Cranbourne.
