= Gary Buckenara =

Australian rules footballer, born 1958

Personal information
- Full name: Gary William Buckenara
- Born: 3 July 1958 (age 68)
- Original team: TTC Churchlands (WAAFL)
- Height: 184 cm (6 ft 0 in)
- Weight: 83 kg (183 lb)

Playing career^{1}
Years	Club	Games (Goals)
1979–1981	Subiaco	61 (100)
1982–1990	Hawthorn	154 (293)
Total		215 (393)

Representative team honours
Years	Team	Games (Goals)
1980–1989	Western Australia	11 (26)

Coaching career
Years	Club	Games (W–L–D)
1992–1993	Sydney Swans	25 (3–21–1)
1992	New South Wales	1 (1–0–0)
1995–1996	Subiaco	45 (26–19–0)
1995	Western Australia	1 (0–1–0)
- ^{1} Playing statistics correct to the end of 1990.

Career highlights
- 4× VFL Premiership player: (1983, 1986, 1988, 1989); Hawthorn Team of the Century; 3× All-Australian team: (1983, 1985, 1986); VFL Team of the Year 1986, 1988; WA State of Origin captain 1988, 1989; Simpson Medal: (1981 – WA v SA); 2nd Hawthorn best and fairest 1986, (3rd in 1988); 2nd Subiaco best and fairest 1979, 1980, 1981; Subiaco Team of the Century; West Australian Football Hall of Fame, inducted 2004; Hawthorn Hall of Fame, inducted 2010; Western Australian Hall of Champions, inducted 2018

Gary William Buckenara (born 3 July 1958) is a former Australian rules footballer who played for the Hawthorn Football Club in the Victorian Football League (VFL) and the Subiaco Football Club in the West Australian Football League (WAFL).

Renowned for his superb high marking and kicking skills, whether passing to teammates or shooting for goal, as well as his performances in "big games", Buckenara is one of a handful of footballers to be named in two separate Teams of the Century, both on the half-forward flank. After a brief coaching stint, the highlight of which was a runner-up finish with Subiaco, Buckenara returned to Hawthorn as an administrator and played a key role in the successful era under Alastair Clarkson.

== Playing career ==
Educated at Churchlands Senior High School, Buckenara was considered an outstanding junior footballer and cricketer. He admitted as a youngster he was more serious about his cricket, playing at the time with Scarborough Cricket Club in Western Australian Grade Cricket alongside test stars Dennis Lillee, Rod Marsh, Sam Gannon, Mick Malone, Greg Shipperd and Tom Hogan. It was not until his older brother Rod invited him to play at Teachers Training College Churchlands in the E Grade of the Western Australian Amateur Football League (WAAFL) that football became Buckenara's first sporting love, and he excelled, winning the E Grade best and fairest in 1977. In 1979 he began his senior League career with Subiaco and quickly attracted attention from Victorian clubs, finishing runner-up in the Tom Outridge Medal in each of his three seasons with the club. The Lions eventually agreed to lease Buckenara to Hawthorn for three years for $210,000 and after a court case began his career at Hawthorn.

During his time at Hawthorn, Buckenara played 154 games, usually playing in the centre or at half-forward when he had problems with his knees. He kicked 293 goals, won four premierships and played on one losing Grand Final team. He played for his state regularly from 1979 onward and he was selected as the Western Australian captain. In 1983, 85 and 86, he was named in the All Australian Team.

In 1985, after being omitted from the senior team for the Grand final, Buckenara kicked eight goals in Hawthorn's reserves premiership victory over Carlton.

In November 1986, Buckenara decided to move back to Perth with his family. The previous year, his mother Dawn had become paralysed following a serious car accident, and with the West Coast Eagles having been granted admission into the VFL for the next season, Buckenara had been offered the vice-captaincy. As Buckenara sought a release from his contract, Hawthorn's chief executive John Lauritz went to the Victorian Supreme Court and argued that Buckenara needed to honour his contract as a legally binding document, lest it cause another chaotic legal precedent similar to that of Silvio Foschini back in 1983.

Buckenara put the disappointment of the legal case behind him, and increased the 2-year option to three years, and proceeded to enjoy another stellar season with Hawthorn. The highlight was undoubtedly his performance in the famous Preliminary final against Melbourne, showing great composure to kick five goals, the last of them later recognised as one of the sport's most unforgettable moments. With only seconds remaining and the Demons clinging to a four-point lead, the Hawks launched one last foray forward. Having been awarded a free kick 50 metres from goal after being tripped by Earl Spalding, Buckenara was thinking of playing on when the final siren sounded, however the crowd noise was so loud that hardly anyone heard it. Amid the commotion, Demons ruckman Jim Stynes had rushed to man up on Hawthorn wingman Robert DiPierdomenico, who had moved into Hawthorn's forward line without an opponent. In doing so, Stynes infringed by running across the mark, which was spotted by field umpire David Howlett who awarded Buckenara a 15-metre penalty, now bringing him within easy kicking distance. Reflecting on the incident many years later, Buckenara recalled that he had not heard the siren and how he had taken his kick quickly to not let the pressure build up:

I didn’t hear siren go. I was thinking to get the ball forward quickly, we’ve got to keep moving this. [...] After the 15 metres was paid, Russell Greene comes up to me, puts his arm around my shoulder – and I still hadn’t heard the siren - and says, ‘for God’s sakes ‘Bucky’ kick the goal, the siren’s gone’. [...] I got on with it pretty quickly, I didn’t leave myself time to ponder and think, ‘geez if I miss this’. That never came into my mind thank goodness.

== Coaching and Administrative Career ==
His career ended early due to knee injuries, and he moved into coaching. He was appointed senior coach of the Sydney Swans in 1992 but was sacked in the middle of the 1993 season, after eighteen straight losses. He returned to his original club Subiaco to coach in 1995 and 1996 and is now one of the staff at Hawthorn. In 2003, he was named in the Hawthorn Team of the Century.

Buckenara has remained involved in football over the years, and is currently the general manager of Frankston in the Victorian Football League.

== Post-Career Honours ==
In October 2018, Buckenara gained further recognition from his home state for his sporting achievements when he was inducted into the Western Australian Hall of Champions.

== See also ==
- After the siren kicks in Australian rules football

== Bibliography ==
- Ken Piesse (1995). The Complete Guide to Australian Football. Pan Macmillan Australia. ISBN 0-330-35712-3.
