= 1987 VFL season =

91st season of the Victorian Football League (VFL)

1987 VFL premiership season
- Teams: 14
- Premiers: Carlton; 15th premiership
- Minor premiers: Carlton; 16th minor premiership
- Night series: Melbourne; 1st Night series win
- Brownlow Medallist: Tony Lockett (St Kilda); John Platten (Hawthorn)
- Coleman Medallist: Tony Lockett (St Kilda)

Attendance
- Matches played: 160
- Total attendance: 3,411,846 (21,324 per match)
- Highest: 92,754 (Grand Final, Carlton vs. Hawthorn)

The 1987 VFL season was the 91st season of the Victorian Football League (VFL). The season ran from 27 March until 26 September, and comprised a 22-game home-and-away season followed by a finals series featuring the top five clubs.

The season saw the beginning of a decade-long period of expansion of the Victorian league to the rest of Australia, with the admission of two newly established clubs: the West Coast Eagles, based in Perth, Western Australia, and the Brisbane Bears, based in South East Queensland. While the league remained the highest level senior Australian rules football competition and administrative body in Victoria, it also became the de facto highest level senior competition in Australia, with representation across four states. In the pre-season, the first modern VFL draft was held.

The premiership was won by the Carlton Football Club for the 15th time, after it defeated Hawthorn by 33 points in the 1987 VFL Grand Final.

== Night series ==
Melbourne defeated Essendon 8.10 (58) to 8.6 (54), to win the Night Series Grand Final at VFL Park.

== Home-and-away season ==
=== Round 1 ===
Home team	Home team score	Away team	Away team score	Venue	Crowd	Date
North Melbourne	15.14 (104)	Brisbane Bears	19.23 (137)	MCG	14,096	Friday 27 March 1987
Collingwood	11.8 (74)	Sydney	25.15 (165)	Victoria Park	17,129	Saturday 28 March 1987
Carlton	15.14 (104)	Hawthorn	22.17 (149)	Princes Park	20,192	Saturday 28 March 1987
St Kilda	15.11 (101)	Geelong	14.18 (102)	Moorabbin Oval	15,867	Saturday 28 March 1987
Melbourne	19.14 (128)	Fitzroy	12.17 (89)	MCG	18,012	Saturday 28 March 1987
Footscray	9.8 (62)	Essendon	19.7 (121)	VFL Park	22,550	Saturday 28 March 1987
West Coast	20.13 (133)	Richmond	16.23 (119)	Subiaco Oval	23,897	Sunday 29 March 1987

=== Round 2 ===
Home team	Home team score	Away team	Away team score	Venue	Crowd	Date
North Melbourne	13.14 (92)	Melbourne	7.17 (59)	MCG	19,035	Friday 3 April 1987
Fitzroy	23.21 (159)	St Kilda	17.13 (115)	Princes Park	11,584	Saturday 4 April 1987
Essendon	17.17 (119)	West Coast	17.12 (114)	Windy Hill	19,959	Saturday 4 April 1987
Richmond	13.15 (93)	Hawthorn	23.17 (155)	MCG	17,824	Saturday 4 April 1987
Geelong	19.17 (131)	Brisbane Bears	23.12 (150)	Kardinia Park	14,480	Saturday 4 April 1987
Collingwood	17.5 (107)	Carlton	16.18 (114)	VFL Park	29,481	Saturday 4 April 1987
Sydney	27.25 (187)	Footscray	11.13 (79)	SCG	15,268	Sunday 5 April 1987

=== Round 3 ===
Home team	Home team score	Away team	Away team score	Venue	Crowd	Date
Fitzroy	20.9 (129)	North Melbourne	7.13 (55)	VFL Park	10,043	Friday 10 April 1987
Geelong	18.20 (128)	Melbourne	13.16 (94)	Kardinia Park	15,391	Saturday 11 April 1987
Richmond	19.16 (130)	Essendon	12.12 (84)	MCG	27,528	Saturday 11 April 1987
Hawthorn	20.25 (145)	Collingwood	10.8 (68)	Princes Park	14,267	Saturday 11 April 1987
Footscray	5.10 (40)	Carlton	18.19 (127)	Western Oval	14,492	Saturday 11 April 1987
St Kilda	21.7 (133)	Brisbane Bears	11.17 (83)	Moorabbin Oval	12,717	Saturday 11 April 1987
West Coast	14.13 (97)	Sydney	18.16 (124)	Subiaco Oval	35,719	Sunday 12 April 1987

=== Round 4 ===
Home team	Home team score	Away team	Away team score	Venue	Crowd	Date
Melbourne	21.13 (139)	St Kilda	14.8 (92)	MCG	25,465	18 April 1987
Geelong	18.19 (127)	North Melbourne	19.22 (136)	Kardinia Park	18,614	18 April 1987
Carlton	29.17 (191)	West Coast	15.14 (104)	Princes Park	21,746	18 April 1987
Brisbane Bears	16.18 (114)	Fitzroy	20.9 (129)	Carrara Stadium	17,795	19 April 1987
Footscray	14.12 (96)	Hawthorn	7.13 (55)	Western Oval	10,425	20 April 1987
Essendon	17.11 (113)	Sydney	9.12 (66)	Windy Hill	24,264	20 April 1987
Collingwood	16.14 (110)	Richmond	15.10 (100)	VFL Park	36,749	20 April 1987

=== Round 5 ===
Home team	Home team score	Away team	Away team score	Venue	Crowd	Date
North Melbourne	18.19 (127)	St Kilda	16.14 (110)	MCG	16,078	24 April 1987
Richmond	19.12 (126)	Sydney	21.20 (146)	MCG	22,154	25 April 1987
Hawthorn	13.14 (92)	West Coast	15.14 (104)	Princes Park	11,068	25 April 1987
Collingwood	14.5 (89)	Footscray	12.13 (85)	Victoria Park	22,039	25 April 1987
Geelong	29.10 (184)	Fitzroy	17.7 (109)	Kardinia Park	18,220	25 April 1987
Carlton	17.14 (116)	Essendon	9.8 (62)	VFL Park	56,124	25 April 1987
Brisbane Bears	12.14 (86)	Melbourne	12.9 (81)	Carrara Stadium	7,451	26 April 1987

=== Round 6 ===
Home team	Home team score	Away team	Away team score	Venue	Crowd	Date
Sydney	13.16 (94)	Carlton	12.15 (87)	SCG	33,659	1 May 1987
Melbourne	16.14 (110)	Richmond	9.15 (69)	MCG	18,482	2 May 1987
Essendon	14.12 (96)	Geelong	13.18 (96)	Windy Hill	15,395	2 May 1987
Collingwood	16.9 (105)	Brisbane Bears	8.10 (58)	Victoria Park	14,689	2 May 1987
Footscray	11.12 (78)	St Kilda	4.10 (34)	VFL Park	12,834	2 May 1987
West Coast	24.18 (162)	North Melbourne	13.10 (88)	Subiaco Oval	28,330	3 May 1987
Hawthorn	16.17 (113)	Fitzroy	15.14 (104)	MCG	18,694	3 May 1987

=== Round 7 ===
Home team	Home team score	Away team	Away team score	Venue	Crowd	Date
West Coast	10.21 (81)	Brisbane Bears	8.14 (62)	WACA Ground	25,799	8 May 1987
Footscray	13.10 (88)	North Melbourne	19.8 (122)	Western Oval	13,395	9 May 1987
St Kilda	21.11 (137)	Richmond	17.12 (114)	Moorabbin Oval	14,909	9 May 1987
Fitzroy	25.9 (159)	Essendon	21.8 (134)	Princes Park	14,564	9 May 1987
Melbourne	18.18 (126)	Collingwood	12.8 (80)	MCG	49,215	9 May 1987
Carlton	22.18 (150)	Geelong	14.10 (94)	VFL Park	31,000	9 May 1987
Sydney	18.14 (122)	Hawthorn	17.12 (114)	SCG	22,273	10 May 1987

=== Round 8 ===
Home team	Home team score	Away team	Away team score	Venue	Crowd	Date
Sydney	13.9 (87)	Fitzroy	16.20 (116)	SCG	24,858	15 May 1987
St Kilda	14.13 (97)	West Coast	6.13 (49)	Moorabbin Oval	11,537	16 May 1987
Hawthorn	17.10 (112)	Geelong	10.5 (65)	Princes Park	9,532	16 May 1987
Melbourne	11.15 (81)	Footscray	15.15 (105)	MCG	16,325	16 May 1987
Collingwood	10.8 (68)	Essendon	14.10 (94)	VFL Park	28,085	16 May 1987
Brisbane Bears	22.12 (144)	Richmond	15.19 (109)	Carrara Stadium	7,944	17 May 1987
North Melbourne	10.11 (71)	Carlton	15.15 (105)	MCG	26,684	17 May 1987

=== Round 9 ===
Home team	Home team score	Away team	Away team score	Venue	Crowd	Date
Richmond	13.16 (94)	North Melbourne	17.26 (128)	MCG	14,220	22 May 1987
Collingwood	15.15 (105)	St Kilda	15.9 (99)	Victoria Park	18,173	23 May 1987
Carlton	12.20 (92)	Fitzroy	9.16 (70)	Princes Park	28,422	23 May 1987
Footscray	14.19 (103)	Brisbane Bears	10.11 (71)	Western Oval	10,673	23 May 1987
Hawthorn	25.15 (165)	Essendon	7.9 (51)	VFL Park	32,634	23 May 1987
Geelong	15.14 (104)	Sydney	11.13 (79)	Kardinia Park	24,476	24 May 1987
West Coast	20.15 (135)	Melbourne	18.11 (119)	Subiaco Oval	23,366	24 May 1987

=== Round 10 ===
Home team	Home team score	Away team	Away team score	Venue	Crowd	Date
Essendon	11.14 (80)	Melbourne	15.12 (102)	Windy Hill	13,862	30 May 1987
Richmond	14.13 (97)	Geelong	18.10 (118)	MCG	16,854	30 May 1987
Footscray	10.19 (79)	Fitzroy	7.4 (46)	Western Oval	12,722	30 May 1987
Carlton	27.22 (184)	Brisbane Bears	12.9 (81)	Princes Park	13,790	30 May 1987
Hawthorn	23.16 (154)	St Kilda	15.8 (98)	VFL Park	15,535	30 May 1987
Sydney	20.16 (136)	North Melbourne	23.7 (145)	SCG	20,084	31 May 1987
West Coast	19.23 (137)	Collingwood	11.14 (80)	Subiaco Oval	38,274	1 June 1987

=== Round 11 ===
Home team	Home team score	Away team	Away team score	Venue	Crowd	Date
Footscray	18.13 (121)	West Coast	15.9 (99)	Western Oval	15,089	6 June 1987
St Kilda	16.10 (106)	Essendon	18.13 (121)	Moorabbin Oval	23,725	6 June 1987
North Melbourne	14.7 (91)	Hawthorn	17.11 (113)	VFL Park	23,606	6 June 1987
Brisbane Bears	9.10 (64)	Sydney	19.23 (137)	Carrara Stadium	11,840	7 June 1987
Fitzroy	18.15 (123)	Richmond	22.17 (149)	Princes Park	12,580	8 June 1987
Melbourne	13.12 (90)	Carlton	21.9 (135)	MCG	49,812	8 June 1987
Geelong	17.13 (115)	Collingwood	17.8 (110)	VFL Park	33,150	8 June 1987

=== Round 12 ===
Home team	Home team score	Away team	Away team score	Venue	Crowd	Date
North Melbourne	15.10 (100)	Essendon	9.10 (64)	MCG	23,944	12 June 1987
Melbourne	11.10 (76)	Sydney	17.10 (112)	MCG	21,696	13 June 1987
Geelong	13.13 (91)	West Coast	12.13 (85)	Kardinia Park	17,483	13 June 1987
Collingwood	15.16 (106)	Fitzroy	11.14 (80)	Victoria Park	17,840	13 June 1987
Carlton	12.25 (97)	St Kilda	14.12 (96)	Princes Park	16,511	13 June 1987
Richmond	11.8 (74)	Footscray	21.16 (142)	VFL Park	16,279	13 June 1987
Brisbane Bears	11.4 (70)	Hawthorn	24.21 (165)	Carrara Stadium	7,284	14 June 1987

=== Round 13 ===
Home team	Home team score	Away team	Away team score	Venue	Crowd	Date
West Coast	16.18 (114)	Fitzroy	5.12 (42)	WACA Ground	13,540	19 June 1987
Hawthorn	6.8 (44)	Melbourne	8.9 (57)	Princes Park	7,596	20 June 1987
Footscray	13.11 (89)	Geelong	8.2 (50)	Western Oval	15,749	20 June 1987
Richmond	4.3 (27)	Carlton	6.7 (43)	MCG	15,916	20 June 1987
Essendon	9.10 (64)	Brisbane Bears	3.9 (27)	Windy Hill	8,832	20 June 1987
Collingwood	2.6 (18)	North Melbourne	10.12 (72)	VFL Park	17,613	20 June 1987
Sydney	20.14 (134)	St Kilda	11.9 (75)	SCG	17,760	21 June 1987

=== Round 14 ===
Home team	Home team score	Away team	Away team score	Venue	Crowd	Date
Sydney	14.17 (101)	Collingwood	10.14 (74)	SCG	20,133	26 June 1987
Richmond	9.19 (73)	West Coast	9.15 (69)	MCG	8,926	27 June 1987
Geelong	13.20 (98)	St Kilda	3.9 (27)	Kardinia Park	13,661	27 June 1987
Fitzroy	11.16 (82)	Melbourne	4.10 (34)	Princes Park	7,643	27 June 1987
Essendon	7.10 (52)	Footscray	9.10 (64)	Windy Hill	17,401	27 June 1987
Hawthorn	12.8 (80)	Carlton	12.7 (79)	VFL Park	44,385	27 June 1987
Brisbane Bears	17.11 (113)	North Melbourne	23.13 (151)	Carrara Stadium	7,716	28 June 1987

=== Round 15 ===
Home team	Home team score	Away team	Away team score	Venue	Crowd	Date
West Coast	18.10 (118)	Essendon	21.20 (146)	WACA Ground	15,740	3 July 1987
Melbourne	15.20 (110)	North Melbourne	16.16 (112)	MCG	17,108	4 July 1987
Hawthorn	19.20 (134)	Richmond	11.11 (77)	Princes Park	10,150	4 July 1987
St Kilda	20.14 (134)	Fitzroy	15.10 (100)	Moorabbin Oval	15,201	4 July 1987
Footscray	10.13 (73)	Sydney	16.10 (106)	VFL Park	27,075	4 July 1987
Brisbane Bears	18.11 (119)	Geelong	10.18 (78)	Carrara Stadium	9,380	5 July 1987
Carlton	20.16 (136)	Collingwood	15.22 (112)	MCG	47,813	5 July 1987

=== Rounds 16 and 17 ===
Rounds 16 and 17 were played concurrently over three weekends: five matches were played on the weekends of 11 and 18 July, and four matches were played on the weekend of 25 July. This fixturing effectively gave each team one bye during the three-week period. However, the matches are still grouped into two complete rounds rather than three partial rounds, which results in a chronological anomaly in which six teams played their Round 17 matches before their Round 16 matches.

	Round 16
Saturday, 11 July (2:10 pm)	Essendon 21.11 (137)	def.	Richmond 12.11 (83)	Windy Hill (crowd: 13593)	Report
Saturday, 11 July (2:10 pm)	North Melbourne 23.18 (156)	def.	Fitzroy 19.9 (123)	MCG (crowd: 15244)	Report
Sunday, 12 July (2:10 pm)	Brisbane Bears 14.9 (93)	def. by	St Kilda 18.13 (121)	Carrara (crowd: 9106)	Report
Saturday, 18 July (2:10 pm)	Carlton 20.13 (133)	def.	Footscray 12.6 (78)	Princes Park (crowd: 21388)	Report
Saturday, 18 July (2:10 pm)	Collingwood 5.13 (43)	def. by	Hawthorn 25.18 (168)	Victoria Park (crowd: 17370)	Report
Sunday, 19 July (2:10 pm)	Sydney 30.21 (201)	def.	West Coast 10.11 (71)	SCG (crowd: 24199)	Report
Saturday, 25 July (2:10 pm)	Melbourne 18.9 (117)	def.	Geelong 11.11 (77)	VFL Park (crowd: 15253)	Report
At the SCG, Sydney recorded the club's highest score in a match. It marked the third time they had kicked 30 goals in a game, the previous time being in Round 13 of the 1982 VFL season against St Kilda. Swans rover Stephen Wright kicked a career-best eight goals in his first game back after missing five weeks due to a hamstring strain.; Hawthorn recorded their biggest-ever win against Collingwood and it was also the Magpies' heaviest-ever defeat at Victoria Park.

Round 17

Home team	Home team score	Away team	Away team score	Venue	Crowd	Date
West Coast	15.17 (107)	Carlton	15.14 (104)	WACA Ground	21,780	10 July 1987
Hawthorn	25.12 (162)	Footscray	9.11 (65)	Princes Park	14,429	11 July 1987
North Melbourne	11.13 (79)	Geelong	27.14 (176)	MCG	20,880	18 July 1987
St Kilda	18.6 (114)	Melbourne	9.14 (68)	VFL Park	20,354	18 July 1987
Richmond	18.20 (128)	Collingwood	14.5 (89)	MCG	24,793	25 July 1987
Fitzroy	17.29 (131)	Brisbane Bears	16.10 (106)	Princes Park	5,824	25 July 1987
Sydney	36.20 (236)	Essendon	11.7 (73)	SCG	24,199	26 July 1987

=== Round 18 ===
Home team	Home team score	Away team	Away team score	Venue	Crowd	Date
Sydney	31.12 (198)	Richmond	15.17 (107)	SCG	17,157	31 July 1987
Fitzroy	20.9 (129)	Geelong	12.15 (87)	Princes Park	8,678	1 August 1987
St Kilda	15.16 (106)	North Melbourne	11.15 (81)	Moorabbin Oval	18,968	1 August 1987
Footscray	9.11 (65)	Collingwood	8.6 (54)	Western Oval	14,514	1 August 1987
Melbourne	22.21 (153)	Brisbane Bears	14.15 (99)	MCG	10,307	1 August 1987
Essendon	10.9 (69)	Carlton	10.10 (70)	VFL Park	29,761	1 August 1987
West Coast	17.13 (115)	Hawthorn	17.12 (114)	Subiaco Oval	24,502	2 August 1987

=== Round 19 ===
Home team	Home team score	Away team	Away team score	Venue	Crowd	Date
West Coast	15.19 (109)	North Melbourne	18.12 (120)	WACA Ground	22,540	7 August 1987
Carlton	17.21 (123)	Sydney	8.7 (55)	Princes Park	32,058	8 August 1987
Richmond	15.10 (100)	Melbourne	17.17 (119)	MCG	15,899	8 August 1987
St Kilda	15.14 (104)	Footscray	15.11 (101)	Moorabbin Oval	23,080	8 August 1987
Geelong	12.20 (92)	Essendon	9.11 (65)	Kardinia Park	18,316	8 August 1987
Hawthorn	26.9 (165)	Fitzroy	16.9 (105)	VFL Park	14,692	8 August 1987
Brisbane Bears	11.11 (77)	Collingwood	14.16 (100)	Carrara Stadium	9,166	9 August 1987

=== Round 20 ===
Home team	Home team score	Away team	Away team score	Venue	Crowd	Date
Hawthorn	20.22 (142)	Sydney	15.7 (97)	Princes Park	20,551	15 August 1987
Essendon	20.7 (127)	Fitzroy	11.20 (86)	Windy Hill	12,510	15 August 1987
Collingwood	8.11 (59)	Melbourne	15.24 (114)	Victoria Park	16,285	15 August 1987
North Melbourne	18.17 (125)	Footscray	18.17 (125)	MCG	18,921	15 August 1987
Geelong	13.10 (88)	Carlton	24.12 (156)	Kardinia Park	22,219	15 August 1987
Richmond	19.19 (133)	St Kilda	8.9 (57)	VFL Park	27,589	15 August 1987
Brisbane Bears	18.11 (119)	West Coast	21.14 (140)	Carrara Stadium	4,859	16 August 1987

=== Round 21 ===
Home team	Home team score	Away team	Away team score	Venue	Crowd	Date
Melbourne	18.21 (129)	West Coast	10.8 (68)	MCG	21,048	21 August 1987
North Melbourne	18.14 (122)	Richmond	11.18 (84)	MCG	15,073	22 August 1987
St Kilda	15.17 (107)	Collingwood	8.10 (58)	Moorabbin Oval	24,335	22 August 1987
Fitzroy	12.12 (84)	Carlton	17.22 (124)	Princes Park	16,126	22 August 1987
Essendon	9.10 (64)	Hawthorn	17.12 (114)	VFL Park	27,046	22 August 1987
Brisbane Bears	10.11 (71)	Footscray	22.21 (153)	Carrara Stadium	6,754	23 August 1987
Sydney	18.14 (122)	Geelong	18.23 (131)	SCG	23,953	23 August 1987

=== Round 22 ===
The final round of the 1987 VFL home-and-away season turned out to be one of the most dramatic and significant in VFL/AFL history. The composition of the final five would be determined by a number of scenarios:

- If Carlton defeated North Melbourne, they would secure the minor premiership and advance straight to the second semi-final
- Hawthorn would win the minor premiership if they beat Geelong and Carlton lost to North
- North could grab third place - and hence the "double chance" - if it beat Carlton and Sydney lost to Fitzroy
- Going into the final round, Geelong held fifth spot, ahead of Footscray on percentage, with Melbourne two premiership points behind both teams. Hence, if the Cats could beat Hawthorn, they would secure a finals berth, but if they lost, then the winner out of Melbourne and Footscray would advance to the finals.

The round began on the Friday night with Richmond and the fledgling Brisbane Bears playing for the wooden spoon; the Bears won easily to ensure they didn't come last in their first season. The significant matches to determine the final five were all played on Saturday afternoon, and they were all thrillers.

	Round 22
Friday, 28 August (7:40 pm)	Richmond 17.11 (113)	def. by	Brisbane Bears 26.13 (169)	MCG (crowd: 12079)	Report
Saturday, 29 August (2:10 pm)	Carlton 20.9 (129)	def.	North Melbourne 19.11 (125)	VFL Park (crowd: 30444)	Report
Saturday, 29 August (2:10 pm)	Fitzroy 20.13 (133)	def. by	Sydney 20.21 (141)	Princes Park (crowd: 11170)	Report
Saturday, 29 August (2:10 pm)	Footscray 10.8 (68)	def. by	Melbourne 12.11 (83)	Western Oval (crowd: 31249)	Report
Saturday, 29 August (2:10 pm)	Geelong 17.21 (123)	def. by	Hawthorn 19.12 (126)	Kardinia Park (crowd: 27030)	Report
Sunday, 30 August (12:10 pm)	West Coast 26.19 (175)	def.	St Kilda 13.9 (87)	Subiaco Oval (crowd: 17617)	Report
Sunday, 30 August (2:10 pm)	Essendon 21.13 (139)	def. by	Collingwood 23.6 (144)	MCG (crowd: 28887)	Report
In an epic, see-sawing clash at VFL Park, Carlton captain Stephen Kernahan kicked a goal after the final siren to snatch a thrilling win over North Melbourne and secure the minor premiership for 1987, their 16th in VFL competition.; Sydney's win over Fitzroy marked the club's first win at Princes Park in 22 years. The Swans trailed at one stage by 41 points in the third quarter, but thereafter began to play more direct football and held off the Lions to secure third spot and the double chance.

== Ladder ==
(P)	Premiers
	Qualified for finals

#	Team	P	W	L	D	PF	PA	%	Pts
1	Carlton (P)	22	18	4	0	2599	1883	138.0	72
2	Hawthorn	22	17	5	0	2781	1891	147.1	68
3	Sydney	22	15	7	0	2846	2197	129.5	60
4	North Melbourne	22	13	8	1	2402	2417	99.4	54
5	Melbourne	22	12	10	0	2189	2026	108.0	48
6	Geelong	22	11	10	1	2355	2348	100.3	46
7	Footscray	22	11	10	1	1959	2046	95.7	46
8	West Coast	22	11	11	0	2386	2438	97.9	44
9	Essendon	22	9	12	1	2075	2318	89.5	38
10	St Kilda	22	9	13	0	2150	2369	90.8	36
11	Fitzroy	22	8	14	0	2328	2544	91.5	32
12	Collingwood	22	7	15	0	1853	2425	76.4	28
13	Brisbane Bears	22	6	16	0	2113	2666	79.3	24
14	Richmond	22	5	17	0	2199	2667	82.5	20

Rules for classification: 1. premiership points; 2. percentage; 3. points for
Average score: 104.7
Source: AFL Tables

== Finals series ==
=== Finals week 1 ===
	Qualifying Final
Saturday, 5 September (2:30 pm)	Hawthorn 23.18 (156)	def.	Sydney 8.9 (57)	VFL Park (crowd: 47752)	Report
Tom Hafey coached his 500th League game, becoming the third to reach the milestone after Jock McHale and his opponent Allan Jeans.; Warwick Capper kicked four goals to become the second player after Tony Lockett to reach 100 goals for the season. He also took a spectacular mark over his opponent Chris Langford.

	Elimination Final
Sunday, 6 September (2:30 pm)	North Melbourne 5.10 (40)	def. by	Melbourne 22.26 (158)	MCG (crowd: 72628)	Report
Melbourne's 118-point win is the largest winning margin in an Elimination Final.

=== Finals week 2 ===
	Semi-finals
SF1: Sunday, 13 September (2:30 pm)	Sydney 10.13 (73)	def. by	Melbourne 21.23 (149)	MCG (crowd: 80292)	Report
SF2: Saturday, 12 September (2:30 pm)	Carlton 11.14 (80)	def.	Hawthorn 10.5 (65)	VFL Park (crowd: 64333)	Report

=== Preliminary final ===
	Preliminary final
Saturday, 19 September (2:30 pm)	Hawthorn 11.14 (80)	def.	Melbourne 10.18 (78)	VFL Park (crowd: 71298)	Report
Melbourne was leading by 4 points at the final siren, though Hawthorn's Gary Buckenara had a free kick 55 metres out. But Melbourne's Jim Stynes ran across the mark and incurred a 15-metre penalty, bringing Buckenara close enough to kick the winning goal after the siren.

=== Grand final ===
	Grand final
Saturday, 26 September (2:50 pm)	Carlton 15.14 (104)	def.	Hawthorn 9.17 (71)	MCG (crowd: 92754)	Report

== Season notes ==
- This season saw the introduction of two new interstate sides: the West Coast Eagles, based in Perth, Western Australia, and the Brisbane Bears, based in Gold Coast, Queensland. They were the first new clubs to join the league since the expansion of 1925, and the first time the league changed from twelve teams since 1943. The clubs were admitted to the league in a meeting on 1 October 1986, with West Coast admitted by an 8–4 majority of the twelve clubs, and Brisbane admitted unanimously. The two new clubs each paid a $A4 million licence fee which was divided equally amongst the existing twelve clubs, many of whom were in desperate need of such a cash injection.
- When the Seven Network refused to offer a significant increase on its previous deal – which the VFL thought was warranted, given the broader audience that interstate expansion would bring – the VFL sold the television rights to on-seller Broadcom, who sold them to the ABC and satellite network Sportsplay. The deals lasted one year, and Seven purchased the exclusive rights back from Broadcom in 1988 at almost double the 1986 rate. Free-to-air broadcasts, alongside the nationally aired games on ABC (and all locally broadcast games via ABV in Victoria), were split on state lines with Seven retaining broadcasts for Western Australia via TVW-7, the games were broadcast as well on SBS Television and The Prime Network (New South Wales) and on Network 10 (Queensland and South Australia).
- The Round 10 match between West Coast and Collingwood was played on the Foundation Day public holiday, which is not observed in Victoria.
- In awful conditions in Round 13, Collingwood kicked only 2.6 (18), the lowest score by any team since 1968. Brian Taylor kicked their only goals in the first few minutes of the second quarter.
- In three home games from Round 16 to Round 18, the Sydney Swans amassed the most prolific string of high scores in VFL history, scoring a total of 97.53 (635). Their individual scores were: 30.21 (201) against West Coast, winning by 130 points; 36.20 (236) against Essendon, winning by 163 points; and 31.12 (198) against Richmond, winning by 91 points.
- The VFL made a loss on the Round 17 match between Fitzroy and Brisbane Bears, which drew a meagre crowd of only 5,824 to Princes Park, despite being one of only three matches in Melbourne that weekend. The league had considered rescheduling the match as the first half of a double-header with one of the other two senior matches that weekend to reduce overall operating expenses, but contracts already in place precluded double-headers from being staged.
- Melbourne ended the third-longest finals drought in league history (twenty-two seasons) by finishing fifth, making the finals for the first time since 1964.
- The Under-19s Grand Final, in which North Melbourne 13.16 (94) defeated Richmond 13.11 (89), ended in controversy when the final siren was alleged to have been blown early. The timekeeper, who was independent of the clubs, was alleged to have blown the siren after only two minutes of time on; but there had been five goals kicked in the final quarter, which would usually have been expected to result in four or five minutes of time on. Richmond lodged a complaint against the timekeeper, but did not protest the result or seek a replay of the match.

== Awards ==
=== Major awards ===
- The Victorian Football League Players' Association Most Valuable Player Award was won by Tony Lockett of St Kilda.
- The Norm Smith Medal was awarded to David Rhys-Jones of Carlton.
- Carlton won the reserves premiership. Carlton 18.17 (125) defeated St Kilda 15.15 (105) in the grand final, held as a curtain-raiser to the seniors Grand Final on 26 September at the Melbourne Cricket Ground.

=== Leading goalkickers ===
- Larger numbers indicate number of goals scored in each round. Subscript numbers indicate total cumulative goals scored through that round.
- Numbers highlighted in blue indicates the player led the Coleman Medal at the end of that round.
- Numbers underlined indicates the player did not play in that round.

	Player	1	2	3	4	5	6	7	8	9	10	11	12	13	14	15	16	17	18	19	20	21	22	Total
1	Tony Lockett	2_{2}	5_{7}	3_{10}	12_{22}	5_{27}	0_{27}	6_{33}	7_{40}	2_{42}	5_{47}	9_{56}	3_{59}	3_{62}	1_{63}	5_{68}	8_{76}	9_{85}	8_{93}	8_{101}	3_{104}	8_{112}	5_{117}	117
2	Warwick Capper	9_{9}	3_{12}	5_{17}	3_{20}	7_{27}	2_{29}	3_{32}	6_{38}	4_{42}	7_{49}	4_{53}	5_{58}	6_{64}	2_{66}	2_{68}	5_{73}	6_{79}	5_{84}	1_{85}	4_{89}	6_{95}	4_{99}	99
3	Jason Dunstall	6_{6}	3_{9}	3_{12}	2_{14}	5_{19}	3_{22}	0_{22}	7_{29}	1_{30}	6_{36}	5_{41}	11_{52}	1_{53}	2_{55}	3_{58}	3_{61}	6_{67}	5_{72}	4_{76}	3_{79}	3_{82}	5_{87}	87
4	Simon Beasley	2_{2}	2_{4}	3_{7}	3_{10}	2_{12}	0_{12}	5_{17}	5_{22}	3_{25}	1_{26}	4_{30}	8_{38}	2_{40}	3_{43}	3_{46}	3_{49}	3_{52}	1_{53}	6_{59}	3_{62}	10_{72}	1_{73}	73
5	Stephen Kernahan	4_{4}	2_{6}	1_{7}	6_{13}	6_{19}	5_{24}	3_{27}	1_{28}	0_{28}	2_{30}	2_{32}	2_{34}	1_{35}	4_{39}	3_{42}	4_{46}	2_{48}	1_{49}	2_{51}	8_{59}	2_{61}	6_{67}	67
6	Richard Osborne	0_{0}	5_{5}	2_{7}	7_{14}	0_{14}	3_{17}	4_{21}	4_{25}	6_{31}	0_{31}	5_{36}	2_{38}	0_{38}	2_{40}	3_{43}	2_{45}	2_{47}	5_{52}	3_{55}	2_{57}	3_{60}	2_{62}	62
6	Bruce Lindner	0_{0}	0_{0}	7_{7}	6_{13}	7_{20}	1_{21}	3_{24}	3_{27}	5_{32}	5_{37}	3_{40}	4_{44}	1_{45}	3_{48}	2_{50}	0_{50}	0_{50}	3_{53}	2_{55}	3_{57}	2_{60}	2_{62}	62
8	Brian Taylor	2_{2}	5_{7}	3_{10}	6_{16}	4_{20}	4_{24}	3_{27}	0_{27}	0_{27}	0_{27}	6_{33}	7_{40}	2_{42}	1_{43}	4_{47}	2_{49}	4_{53}	2_{55}	2_{57}	2_{59}	1_{60}	0_{60}	60
9	Dermott Brereton	1_{1}	0_{1}	0_{1}	0_{1}	1_{2}	1_{3}	3_{6}	6_{12}	6_{18}	6_{24}	3_{27}	5_{32}	1_{33}	3_{36}	2_{38}	1_{39}	4_{43}	3_{46}	3_{49}	4_{53}	2_{55}	1_{56}	56
10	Gary Ablett	2_{2}	8_{10}	3_{13}	3_{16}	1_{17}	2_{19}	1_{20}	4_{24}	2_{26}	5_{31}	4_{35}	5_{40}	3_{43}	2_{45}	2_{47}	0_{47}	6_{53}	0_{53}	0_{53}	0_{53}	0_{53}	0_{53}	53

== Sources ==
- 1987 VFL season at AFL Tables
- 1987 VFL season at Australian Football
