= 1989 VFL finals series =

1989 premiership season
- Date: 9–30 September 1989
- Teams: 5
- Premiers: Hawthorn (8th premiership)
- Runners-up: Geelong (13th grand final)
- Minor premiers: Hawthorn (18th minor premiership)

Attendance
- Matches played: 6
- Total attendance: 429,057 (71,510 per match)
- Highest: 94,796 (Grand Final, Hawthorn vs. Geelong)

The 1989 Victorian Football League finals series was the 93rd annual edition of the VFL/AFL final series, the Australian rules football tournament staged to determine the winner of the 1989 VFL Premiership season. The series ran over four weekends in September 1989, culminating with the 1989 VFL Grand Final at the Melbourne Cricket Ground on 30 September 1989.

== Qualification ==
After thoroughly dominating the competition the previous season, it again appeared that nothing could stand in the way of the Hawthorn juggernaut. They moved to the top of the ladder in Round 4 after beating Richmond and stayed there for the rest of the home-and-away season, finishing two games clear of second-placed Essendon with 19 wins and a percentage of 153. Full-forward Jason Dunstall reached his second successive century of goals in a season against Carlton in Round 18 and would finish the home-and-away season with 128 majors.
The Bombers, who narrowly missed out on the finals in 1988, put together an eight-game winning streak in the second half of the season, the high point being their 142-point thrashing of West Coast, keeping them to a solitary goal for the match. The streak began after a loss to Sydney and ended with another loss to Sydney in Round 21, which cost them any chance of top spot.
Under new coach Malcolm Blight, Geelong qualified for their first VFL finals series since 1981 after a season where they broke various club and League scoring records. After their thrilling Round 6 shoot-out against Hawthorn (in which they set the League record for the highest losing score), the Cats went on a rampage, starting with three consecutive victories of over 100 points against St Kilda, Brisbane Bears and Richmond. They strung together six further wins to consolidate their spot in the Top Five, eventually finishing the home-and-away season in third place with 16 wins and a new League record for the highest points aggregate with 2916 points, breaking Sydney's 1987 record. Paul Couch racked up over 600 disposals on his way to the Brownlow Medal, while prolific on-ballers Mark Bairstow, Andrew Bews and Garry Hocking would also consistently provide quality service to Geelong's spectacular forwards led by Gary Ablett, who was ably assisted by Gavin Exell, Barry Stoneham and Bill Brownless.
1988 runner-up Melbourne had a strong first half of the season, at one stage sitting second on the ladder after winning a hard-fought match against Hawthorn. In the end, the three-game buffer the Demons held over the teams battling for fifth spot was enough to secure them a third consecutive finals berth, despite losing five of their last six games in the home-and-away rounds. In the process, Melbourne became one of only a few teams to make the finals with a percentage of less than 100.

== Matches ==
The 1989 VFL finals series was contested using the McIntyre final five system, which had been in use since 1972.

=== Week one (Qualifying and Elimination Finals) ===
==== Elimination Final (Melbourne v Collingwood) ====
The Elimination Final saw fourth-placed Melbourne host fifth-placed Collingwood at VFL Park. This marked the 22nd final between the two clubs, having previously met in the 1988 First Semi-Final which was won by Melbourne. They had contested seven Grand finals – in 1926, 1939, 1955, 1956, 1958, 1960 and 1964. Melbourne had won all but one of those Grand finals (when Collingwood famously prevented them from matching the four-in-a-row premiership feat in 1958), and the overall record was also in Melbourne's favour, with 15 wins, 5 losses and a draw in the 1928 Second Semi-Final.

Teams
This shows the teams as listed in The Football Record on the Thursday before the game. Both teams were missing key players due to injury; Melbourne were missing star key-position player Garry Lyon (who had been out for several weeks with a groin/thigh injury) and defender Danny Hughes (groin strain), while for Collingwood Darren Millane and Paul Hawke were unavailable, and full-forward Brian Taylor was omitted after admitting to coach Leigh Matthews that he was not fully fit.

Melbourne	Collingwood

B:	27 Sean Wight	4 Tony Campbell	9 Alan Johnson
HB:	14 Rod Grinter	28 Jamie Duursma	17 Brett Lovett
C:	41 Peter Rohde	7 Brian Wilson	18 Steven Stretch
HF:	21 Steven Febey	5 Earl Spalding	12 Todd Viney
F:	48 Luke Beveridge	19 Darren Bennett	11 Jim Stynes
Foll:	1 Steven O'Dwyer	34 Stephen Newport	33 Greg Healy (c)
Int:	8 Graeme Yeats	45 Ricky Jackson	
Coach:	John Northey		

B:	43 Brendan Tranter	12 Denis Banks (vc)	3 Michael Gayfer
HB:	28 Gavin Crosisca	21 Michael Christian	54 Terry Hecker
C:	7 Shane Morwood	22 Tony Shaw (c)	19 Graham Wright
HF:	24 Jamie Turner	33 David Cloke	2 David Robertson
F:	35 Peter Daicos	27 Craig Starcevich	37 Athas Hrysoulakis
Foll:	38 Damian Monkhorst	26 Gavin Brown	44 Shane Kerrison
Int:	23 Craig Kelly	25 Ron McKeown	
Coach:	Leigh Matthews		

Match summary
Collingwood started well, with captain Shaw prolific early, gathering eight possessions in the opening 15 minutes and ably supported by Wright and Hrysoulakis. In the absence of Taylor, Starcevich provided a viable alternative with three first half goals. A five-goal burst at the start of the third quarter helped Melbourne gain a lead they would not relinquish. The siren eventually sounded with the Demons having won their third consecutive elimination final, while for Collingwood it was again a bitter disappointment. Matthews

Scorecard

Elimination Final
Saturday, 9 September 2:30pm	Melbourne	def.	Collingwood	VFL Park (crowd: 63,062)
2.1 (13); 5.4 (34); 14.6 (90); 17.9 (111)	Q1; Q2; Q3; Final	3.2 (20); 6.7 (43); 10.7 (67); 13.10 (88)	Umpires: Carey, Sheehan
Bennett 4 Wilson 3 Campbell, Healy, Jackson 2 Newport, Spalding, Yeats, Viney 1	Goals	3 Starcevich; 2 Kelly; 1 Banks, Brown, Cloke, Crosisca, Daicos, Hrysoulakis, Robertson, Shaw
Febey, Spalding, Wilson, Lovett, Stynes, Duursma, Johnson, Jackson	Best	Wright, Hrysoulakis, Starcevich, Robertson, Turner
Beveridge (jarred knee)	Injuries
Reports	Kerrison (striking)

==== Qualifying Final (Essendon v Geelong) ====
The Qualifying Final saw second-placed Essendon host third-placed Geelong at the Melbourne Cricket Ground. This marked the 11th occasion the two sides had met in a VFL final, with Essendon having won seven of the previous encounters and Geelong three, including the 1951 VFL Grand Final. The Cats were competing in their first VFL finals series since 1981, while the Bombers had proved themselves one of the teams of the 1980s, having contested six of the previous eight VFL finals series and winning consecutive premierships in 1984 and 1985. Although Essendon had not qualified for the finals the previous two seasons, the team still contained a number of key players from those premiership years.

===== Match Summary =====
Essendon's finals experience proved vital as they brushed aside a nervous Geelong team.

===== Scorecard =====
Qualifying Final
Sunday, 10 September 2:30pm	Essendon	def.	Geelong	MCG (crowd: 75,861)
5.5 (35); 12.9 (81); 19.12 (126); 24.13 (157)	Q1; Q2; Q3; Final	2.4 (16); 6.5 (41); 7.7 (49); 11.15 (81)	Umpires: Rich, Mitchell
Vander Haar 5 Long 4 Bewick, T Daniher 3 Antrobus, Plain, Watson 2 Bailey, Ezard, Madden 1	Goals	3 Ablett, Hamilton; 1 Bews, Brownless, Bruns, Exell, G Hocking
Long, Bewick, Madden, Anderson, O'Donnell, T Daniher, Antrobus	Best	Lindner, Bews, Ablett, Bos

=== Week two (semi-finals) ===
==== First Semi-Final (Geelong vs Melbourne) ====
The First Semi-Final saw Geelong host Melbourne at the MCG. It was the third time the two sides had met in a VFL final, the previous occasion being over 30 years ago in the 1954 Preliminary final, which was won by Melbourne. The Cats made two changes to the side following their disappointing performance in the Qualifying final - Gavin Exell and Darren Morgan were replaced by Spiro Malakellis and David Cameron - while the Demons fielded an unchanged team from their Elimination Final victory.

===== Teams =====
Geelong	Melbourne

B:	1 Steve Hocking	23 Michael Schulze	28 Tim Darcy
HB:	24 Mark Bos	16 Bill Brownless	21 Mark Yeates
C:	12 Spiro Malakellis	7 Paul Couch	36 David Cameron
HF:	2 Bruce Lindner	26 Barry Stoneham	32 Garry Hocking
F:	19 Neville Bruns	5 Gary Ablett	25 Shane Hamilton
Foll:	30 Damian Bourke (c)	3 Mark Bairstow (vc)	27 Andrew Bews (dvc)
Int:	14 Darren Flanigan	29 Damian Drum	
Coach:	Malcolm Blight		

B:	9 Alan Johnson	28 Jamie Duursma	27 Sean Wight
HB:	14 Rod Grinter	5 Earl Spalding	17 Brett Lovett
C:	41 Peter Rohde	7 Brian Wilson	18 Steven Stretch
HF:	21 Steven Febey	4 Tony Campbell	12 Todd Viney
F:	11 Jim Stynes	19 Darren Bennett	48 Luke Beveridge
Foll:	1 Steven O'Dwyer	34 Stephen Newport	33 Greg Healy (c)
Int:	45 Ricky Jackson	8 Graeme Yeats	
Coach:	John Northey		

===== Match Summary =====
After a week of criticism for their poor showing in the Qualifying final, Malcolm Blight demonstrated his ability to take calculated tactical risks to confuse the opposition and show his intent. Although Paul Couch and Mark Bairstow had been named in the starting line-up on the Thursday night, Blight anticipated that Melbourne would assign players to negate their influence. When the teams took their places on the field, the Demons were caught by surprise when Couch and Bairstow went to the bench and their places were taken in the middle by Mark Yeates and Damian Drum. After being physically dominated by Essendon, the Cats were keen to assert themselves from the beginning.
The opening quarter was a fiery affair, with Geelong's excessive aggression threatening to backfire at times. While both sides had even scoring chances in the first half, Melbourne's wasted opportunities, especially in the second quarter when it kicked two goals and six behinds, were to prove costly. At the other end, Gary Ablett and Barry Stoneham were proving a handful for the Melbourne defence, having kicked seven of Geelong's eight goals for the half.
After starting on the bench, Couch and Bairstow were brought on for the second half as Geelong looked to capitalize on their half-time lead. Ablett finished the game with seven goals and provided some unforgettable highlights, the first being a spectacular high mark, jumping into a pack and splitting it as he juggled the mark while falling to the ground. Almost as brilliant as his spectacular high mark over the pack was his one-handed mark in a one-on-one contest with Rod Grinter a few minutes later, which was finished with an excellent set shot goal.

===== Scorecard =====
First semi-final
Sunday, 17 September (2:30pm)	Geelong	def.	Melbourne	MCG (crowd: 69,082)	Report
3.3 (21); 8.8 (56); 12.11 (83); 22.21 (153)	Q1; Q2; Q3; Final	1.5 (11); 3.11 (29); 8.16 (64); 12.18 (90)	Umpires: Sheehan, Russo; Television broadcast: Seven Network
Ablett 7 Stoneham 4 Brownless, Cameron 3 Hamilton 2 Bews, Couch, Darcy 1	Goals	3 Stretch; 2 Bennett; 1 Newport, Grinter, Yeats, Stynes, O'Dwyer, Healy, Beveridge
Hamilton, Bews, Stoneham, Ablett, S Hocking, Malakellis, Bairstow	Best	Lovett, Hurn, Stynes, Viney
Nil	Injuries	Nil
Yeates (striking), G Hocking (tripping)	Reports	Nil

==== Second Semi-Final (Hawthorn vs Essendon) ====
The Second Semi-Final saw Hawthorn play Essendon at VFL Park. The two clubs last met in the 1985 VFL Grand Final which was won by Essendon.

===== Teams =====
Hawthorn	Essendon

Hawthorn
B:	4 Andrew Collins	24 Chris Langford	7 Gary Ayres
HB:	20 Scott Maginness	2 Chris Mew	34 John Kennedy
C:	18 Darrin Pritchard	3 Anthony Condon	9 Robert DiPierdomenico
HF:	11 Gary Buckenara	23 Dermott Brereton	25 Peter Curran
F:	10 Chris Wittman	19 Jason Dunstall	8 Dean Anderson
Foll:	14 Greg Dear	17 Michael Tuck (c)	44 John Platten
Int:	35 James Morrissey	31 Greg Madigan	
Coach:	Allan Jeans		

Essendon
B:	49 Spiro Malakellis	28 Tim Darcy	24 Mark Bos
HB:	2 Bruce Lindner	23 Michael Schulze	1 Steve Hocking
C:	32 Garry Hocking	7 Paul Couch	19 Neville Bruns
HF:	5 Gary Ablett	26 Barry Stoneham	21 Mark Yeates
F:	8 Robert Scott	16 Billy Brownless	36 David Cameron
Foll:	30 Damian Bourke (c)	3 Mark Bairstow	27 Andrew Bews
Int:	14 Darren Flanigan	25 Shane Hamilton	
Coach:	Kevin Sheedy		

===== Match Summary =====
The highlight of the game was Brereton's perfectly executed hip-and-shoulder on Paul Vander Haar.

===== Scorecard =====
Second semi-final
Saturday, 16 September (2:30pm)	Hawthorn	def.	Essendon	VFL Park (crowd: 66,003)	Report
3.2 (20); 8.4 (52); 13.10 (88); 16.16 (112)	Q1; Q2; Q3; Final	5.4 (34); 7.6 (48); 9.6 (60); 11.10 (76)	Umpires: Clayton, Cameron; Television broadcast: Seven Network
Dunstall 6 Buckenara 3 Curran, Pritchard 2 Dear, DiPierdomenico, Anderson 1	Goals	3 Bewick, Salmon; 1 Antrobus, Long, Ezard, T Daniher, Manning
Platten, Anderson, Ayres, Buckenara, Dear, Pritchard	Best	Walsh, Anderson, Williams, Thompson, T Daniher, Hamilton
Nil	Reports	Nil

=== Week three (Preliminary Final) ===
==== Preliminary final (Essendon vs Geelong) ====
The Preliminary Final saw Essendon play Geelong at VFL Park on Saturday 23 September for the right to contest the grand final against Hawthorn. This marked the 400th VFL finals match since 1897, and it was somewhat appropriate that it should be contested by Essendon and Geelong, since both those teams had finished the inaugural League season first and second, respectively. Essendon were forced to make a number of changes to the starting team, with Salmon, Harvey, Duckworth and Vander Haar all unavailable. For Geelong, there was only one change to the team which had beaten Melbourne the previous week; Robert Scott was selected to replace the suspended Mark Yeates.

===== Teams =====
Essendon	Geelong

Essendon
B:	16 Paul Hamilton	6 Anthony Daniher	26 Mark Thompson
HB:	15 Alan Ezard	30 Kevin Walsh	44 Gary O'Donnell
C:	4 Michael Long	41 Andrew Manning	11 Greg Anderson
HF:	32 Tim Watson (c)	5 Terry Daniher	14 Bradley Plain
F:	21 Dean Wallis	24 Michael Werner	2 Tony Antrobus
Foll:	27 Simon Madden (vc)	13 Darren Williams	8 Darren Bewick
Int:	17 Kieran Sporn	31 Dean Bailey	
Coach:	Kevin Sheedy		

Geelong
B:	12 Spiro Malakellis	23 Michael Schulze	1 Steve Hocking
HB:	24 Mark Bos	28 Tim Darcy	29 Damian Drum
C:	19 Neville Bruns	7 Paul Couch	5 Gary Ablett
HF:	25 Shane Hamilton	26 Barry Stoneham	32 Garry Hocking
F:	36 David Cameron	16 Bill Brownless	2 Bruce Lindner
Foll:	30 Damian Bourke (c)	3 Mark Bairstow	27 Andrew Bews
Int:	14 Darren Flanigan	8 Robert Scott	
Coach:	Malcolm Blight		

===== Match summary =====
In a dramatic 170-point turnaround, Geelong thrashed Essendon by 94 points. Essendon started well, leading by 11 points midway through the first quarter before Geelong took complete control. Blight again showed his willingness to experiment with positioning by playing his two half-forward flankers in defence, allowing his forwards more space. Gary Ablett led the way with eight goals.

===== Scorecard =====
Preliminary Final
Saturday, 23 September (2:30pm)	Essendon	def. by	Geelong	VFL Park (crowd: 67892)	Report
4.3 (27); 6.4 (40); 6.9 (45); 10.10 (70)	Q1; Q2; Q3; Final	6.4 (40); 13.12 (90); 19.15 (129); 24.20 (164)	Umpires: Rich, Carey; Television broadcast: Seven Network
Bewick, Sporn, Watson 2 Antrobus, Long, Anderson, Manning 1	Goals	8 Ablett; 4 Brownless; 3 Stoneham; 2 Couch, Scott, G Hocking; 1 Cameron, Bairstow, Bews
T Daniher, Buckenara, Tuck, Russo, Langford, Ayres	Best	Ablett, G Hocking, Stoneham, Bairstow, Bews, Bruns, Lindner, Couch
Nil	Injuries	Nil
Nil	Reports	Nil

=== Week four (Grand Final) ===
This was Hawthorn's seventh successive Grand Final appearance, while Geelong were appearing in the big decider for the first time since 1967. The Hawks were chasing their 8th premiership and aiming to win back-to-back flags for the first time in the club's history, which they achieved in a high-scoring shootout. Gary Ablett Sr. tied Gordon Coventry's 1928 record for most goals in a grand final, kicking 9 for the game and 27 for the 1989 finals campaign; both remain as league records to this day. Despite Ablett's dominance, Geelong lost by 6 points. The game was famous for Brereton's inspirational comeback after having his ribs broken and his kidney bruised.

By the end of the match, Hawthorn had only 13 fit players on the field. Scottish soccer player Ray Stewart observed the game and was recorded to have said: "I would not play this game for a million dollars." The game is considered to be one of the best grand finals of all time. Rohan Connolly, writing for The Age, claimed it was the best grand final of all time.

Grand Final
30 September (2:50 pm)	Hawthorn	def.	Geelong	MCG (crowd: 94,796)	Report
8.4 (52); 12.9 (81); 18.13 (121); 21.18 (144)	Q1; Q2; Q3; Final	2.0 (12); 7.2 (44); 13.7 (85); 21.12 (138)	Umpires: Carey, Sheehan; Norm Smith Medal: Gary Ablett; Television broadcast: Seven Network; National anthem: John Farnham
Dunstall, Anderson, Buckenara 4 Brereton, Curran 3 DiPierdomenico, Wittman, Morrissey 1	Goals	9 Ablett; 2 Brownless, Stoneham, Hamilton, Cameron; 1 Bews, Bairstow, Bruns, Flanigan
Pritchard, Anderson, DiPierdomenico, Buckenara, Dunstall, Curran, Mew	Best	Ablett, Flanigan, Lindner, Hamilton, Bews, Couch
Brereton (ribs / kidney), Platten (concussion), DiPierdomenico (lung), Ayres (hamstring)	Injuries	Bourke (ankle)
DiPierdomenico (striking)	Reports	Nil

== Bibliography ==
- Atkinson, Graeme; Atkinson, Brant (2009). The Complete Book of AFL Finals (4th ed.). The Five Mile Press. ISBN 9781742112756.
