= 1989 VFL grand final =

Grand final of the 1989 Victorian Football League season

1989 VFL Grand final

| Hawthorn | Geelong |
|---|---|
| 21.18 (144) | 21.12 (138) |
| | 1 | 2 | 3 | 4 |
|---|---|---|---|---|
| HAW | 8.4 (52) | 12.9 (81) | 18.13 (121) | 21.18 (144) |
| GEE | 2.0 (12) | 7.2 (44) | 13.7 (85) | 21.12 (138) |
- Date: 30 September 1989
- Stadium: Melbourne Cricket Ground, Melbourne, Australia
- Attendance: 94,796
- Favourite: Hawthorn
- Umpires: Sheehan, Carey
- Coin toss won by: Geelong
- Kicked toward: City end

Ceremonies
- National anthem: John Farnham

Accolades
- Norm Smith Medallist: Gary Ablett Sr. (Geelong)
- Jock McHale Medallist: Allan Jeans

Broadcast in Australia
- Network: Seven Network
- Commentators: Sandy Roberts (host); Dennis Cometti (commentator); Ian Robertson (commentator); Don Scott (expert commentator); Bernie Quinlan (boundary rider); Michael Roberts (boundary rider); Peter McKenna (analyst); Ross Glendinning (analyst)

The 1989 VFL Grand Final was an Australian rules football game contested between the Hawthorn Football Club and the Geelong Football Club, held at the Melbourne Cricket Ground in Melbourne on 30 September 1989. It was the 93rd annual grand final of the Victorian Football League, staged to determine the premiers for the 1989 VFL season. The match, attended by 94,796 spectators, was won by Hawthorn by a margin of 6 points, marking that club's eighth premiership victory. It is regarded as one of the greatest grand finals of all time, noted for its high scoring, close winning margin, extreme physical toughness, and the courage and on-field heroics displayed by its injured players.

== Background ==
Hawthorn were playing in their seventh successive Grand Final and eager to successfully defend the premiership for the first time in their history, after being denied in 1984 and 1985 by Essendon, and 1987 by Carlton. Under new coach Malcolm Blight, Geelong had become the most exciting team in the competition to watch, their all-out attacking style of play setting a point-scoring record for the home-and-away season (425 goals and 366 behinds for a total of 2916 points, at an average of nearly 133 points per game) and making it to their first VFL Grand Final since 1967.

In the finals series leading up to the game, Geelong lost the Qualifying Final to Essendon by 76 points before beating Melbourne by 63 points in the first semi-final, and then defeating Essendon by 94 points in the preliminary final to advance to the grand final. Hawthorn had a much easier run, defeating Essendon in the second Semi-Final to advance straight to the grand final.

In the week leading up to the grand final, Geelong's Paul Couch was awarded the Brownlow Medal.

== Match summary ==
=== First quarter ===
The grand final was played in near-perfect conditions. Geelong made their intentions clear right from the start when Mark Yeates ran through Hawthorn's champion centre half-forward and enforcer Dermott Brereton. As Geelong coach Malcolm Blight would later admit, this had been a premeditated strategy to protect star midfielder Paul Couch and negate Brereton, who constantly used his aggression to unsettle the opposition. Yeates was chosen to carry out the deed, partly as payback for when Brereton had flattened him in the classic round 6 clash earlier in the season. Amidst the chaos in the middle of the ground, the Cats rushed the ball forward to Gary Ablett, who kicked the first of his nine goals for the afternoon. Yeates' hit left Brereton with broken ribs and a bruised kidney, which caused him internal bleeding. Hawthorn physiotherapist Barry Gavin recalled the scene years later:

"The thing that really struck me was how bad he was when I got there. He'd lost all the colour in his face and was vomiting. He'd dragged himself back on his feet by this stage. But he was doubled over, dry-retching and his colour was grey... There was no way he could stay out there. I remember looking up at [Hawthorn coach Allan Jeans] in the box and starting to try to get him off. Dermott said, 'No, no. Just get me down to the pocket'. Terry Gay (Hawthorn's team doctor) came out. He was more worried than me. He recognised the gravity of it."

As Brereton himself noted when recalling the incident:

He almost did the job completely, but luckily none of the impact got me in the head, so I was still able to think relatively clearly. I stayed on because I knew that if I had have gone off, that would be the end of my race. I’d cool down and I wouldn’t be able to resume again.

Despite the insistence of the club doctors and trainers, Brereton refused to leave the field and instead was helped to the forward pocket. Moments later, a questionable free kick paid to Hawthorn after the centre bounce saw the ball came into their attacking zone, where Dunstall marked and kicked a goal to level the scores. Barely a minute after that, Brereton, only moments ago on the ground and seemingly out of the game, took a strong mark, then steadied and kicked truly. Brereton's inspirational act lifted the Hawks, and, with the Cats focusing on attacking the man rather than the ball, they slammed on a further six goals to take a commanding 40-point lead at quarter time. However, Geelong's physical approach was starting to take its toll on the Hawks. Besides the injury to Brereton, John Platten had been concussed, and Robert DiPierdomenico was crunched from behind by Ablett while going backwards to take a mark; consequently, DiPierdomenico had suffered broken ribs and a punctured lung, although the full extent of the injury was not known at the time.

=== Second quarter ===
Geelong captain and ruckman Damian Bourke was replaced by Darren Flanigan in the second quarter, and he began to have an immediate impact in the ruck contests. Stoneham and Ablett gave Geelong the perfect start to the quarter, the latter nailing his set shot with a perfectly executed banana kick after reeling in a spectacular one-handed mark after holding his position against his opponent Scott Maginness. Just as it looked like Hawthorn was getting away again, Ablett inspired the Geelong supporters with two goals in as many minutes, the second one going down in football folklore: jumping up to grab the ball from a boundary throw-in deep in the forward pocket and snapped truly from a tight angle. When Andrew Bews added another, Geelong had cut the margin back to 24 points. Maginness, Ablett's opponent up to that point, was moved onto Billy Brownless, while Chris Langford was assigned to mind Ablett for the rest of the game. In time-on, Hawthorn managed to score further goals through Dunstall and take a 37-point lead at the main break.

=== Third quarter ===
Yet again, the Cats scored the first goal of the quarter when Ablett marked a centering high kick from Garry Hocking in the sixth minute and calmly slotted his fifth goal. The Cats kept attacking, but every goal seemed to be met with a Hawthorn reply. When the siren sounded to end the third quarter, Hawthorn led by 36 points.

=== Final quarter ===
The Hawks had no fit players left to rotate on the interchange. As such, the Cats were finally able to get on a run, but after Dean Anderson goaled to put Hawthorn 17 points up with the game in the dying stages, it looked to be just enough. Ablett then kicked his ninth goal, a behind to Hawthorn was then scored from a set shot by Peter Curran followed by Geelong's David Cameron calmly collecting himself and kicking another goal for the Cats which made the difference just a goal with 29 seconds left on the clock. Geelong could not clear from the last centre bounce, and the final siren sounded with the Hawks 6 points ahead.

=== Aftermath and legacy ===
In the ensuing moments of celebration, DiPierdomenico was rushed to St Vincent's Hospital. Ablett's nine goals equalled the record for most goals kicked in a grand final, tying Gordon Coventry's 61-year-old record of goals in a grand final set in the 1928 VFL Grand Final; additionally, he increased his goal total for the 1989 finals series to a record-setting 27 goals. Both records still stand to this day. The Norm Smith Medal was awarded to Ablett for being judged the best player afield, being the second player (after Maurice Rioli) to win the award on the losing team. Coincidentally, Ablett had also won man of the match in the 1989 Panasonic Cup (the pre-season grand final) earlier that year against Melbourne, also doing so in a losing team in a single-digit loss; however, in that match, Ablett—perhaps in an act of desperation that night by coach Malcolm Blight—played much of the game as a defender and only kicked a single goal.

By the end of the match, Hawthorn had only 13 fit players on the field. Scottish soccer player Ray Stewart observed the game and was recorded to have said: "I would not play this game for a million dollars."

The game is considered to be one of the best grand finals of all time. Journalist Rohan Connolly, writing for The Age in 2015, claimed it was the best grand final of all time.

In the documentary series The Final Story, Malcolm Blight was able to acknowledge the significance of the game in football history:

That fact that the '89 grand final is held in such esteem by most people that love the game of football ... it was a joy to be involved, for all the good and bad of it. It's just that every time we talk about it now, we still can't win the bloody thing.

== Teams ==
| Hawthorn | Geelong |

Hawthorn
| B: | 4 Andrew Collins | 24 Chris Langford | 7 Gary Ayres |
| HB: | 20 Scott Maginness | 2 Chris Mew | 34 John Kennedy |
| C: | 18 Darrin Pritchard | 3 Anthony Condon | 9 Robert DiPierdomenico |
| HF: | 11 Gary Buckenara | 23 Dermott Brereton | 25 Peter Curran |
| F: | 10 Chris Wittman | 19 Jason Dunstall | 8 Dean Anderson |
| Foll: | 14 Greg Dear | 17 Michael Tuck (c) | 44 John Platten |
| Int: | 35 James Morrissey | 31 Greg Madigan | |
| Coach: | Allan Jeans | | |

Geelong
| B: | 12 Spiro Malakellis | 28 Tim Darcy | 24 Mark Bos |
| HB: | 2 Bruce Lindner | 23 Michael Schulze | 1 Steve Hocking |
| C: | 32 Garry Hocking | 7 Paul Couch | 19 Neville Bruns |
| HF: | 5 Gary Ablett Sr. | 26 Barry Stoneham | 21 Mark Yeates |
| F: | 8 Robert Scott | 16 Billy Brownless | 36 David Cameron |
| Foll: | 30 Damian Bourke (c) | 3 Mark Bairstow | 27 Andrew Bews |
| Int: | 14 Darren Flanigan | 25 Shane Hamilton | |
| Coach: | Malcolm Blight | | |

== Result ==
1989 VFL Grand Final
Saturday, 30 September 2:50pm | Hawthorn | def. | Geelong | MCG (crowd: 94,796) | Report
8.4 (52); 12.9 (81); 18.13 (121); 21.18 (144) | Q1; Q2; Q3; Final | 2.0 (12); 7.2 (44); 13.7 (85); 21.12 (138) | Umpires: Sheehan, Carey; Norm Smith Medal: Gary Ablett; Television broadcast: Seven Network; National anthem: John Farnham
Dunstall, Anderson, Buckenara 4 Brereton, Curran 3 DiPierdomenico, Wittman, Morrissey 1 | Goals | 9 Ablett; 2 Brownless, Stoneham, Hamilton, Cameron; 1 Bews, Bairstow, Bruns, Flanigan
Pritchard, Anderson, DiPierdomenico, Buckenara, Dunstall, Curran, Mew | Best | Ablett, Flanigan, Lindner, Hamilton, Bews, Couch
Brereton (ribs / kidney), Platten (concussion), DiPierdomenico (lung), Ayres (hamstring) | Injuries | Bourke (ankle)
DiPierdomenico (striking) | Reports | Cameron (striking)
Match was also broadcast on 3AW and 3LO radio

== Tribunal ==
- Cameron (Geelong) by field umpire Carey and boundary umpire Hammond for striking Anderson (Hawthorn) with a right forearm to the head during the second quarter. Cameron was suspended for 3 matches.
- DiPierdomenico (Hawthorn) by field umpire Sheehan and emergency umpire Rich for striking G. Hocking (Geelong) with a left elbow to the face during the third quarter. DiPierdomenico was suspended for 5 matches.

== See also ==
- 1989 NSWRL Grand Final
- 2008 AFL Grand Final
