= 1991 AFL Grand Final =

Grand final of the 1991 Australian Football League season

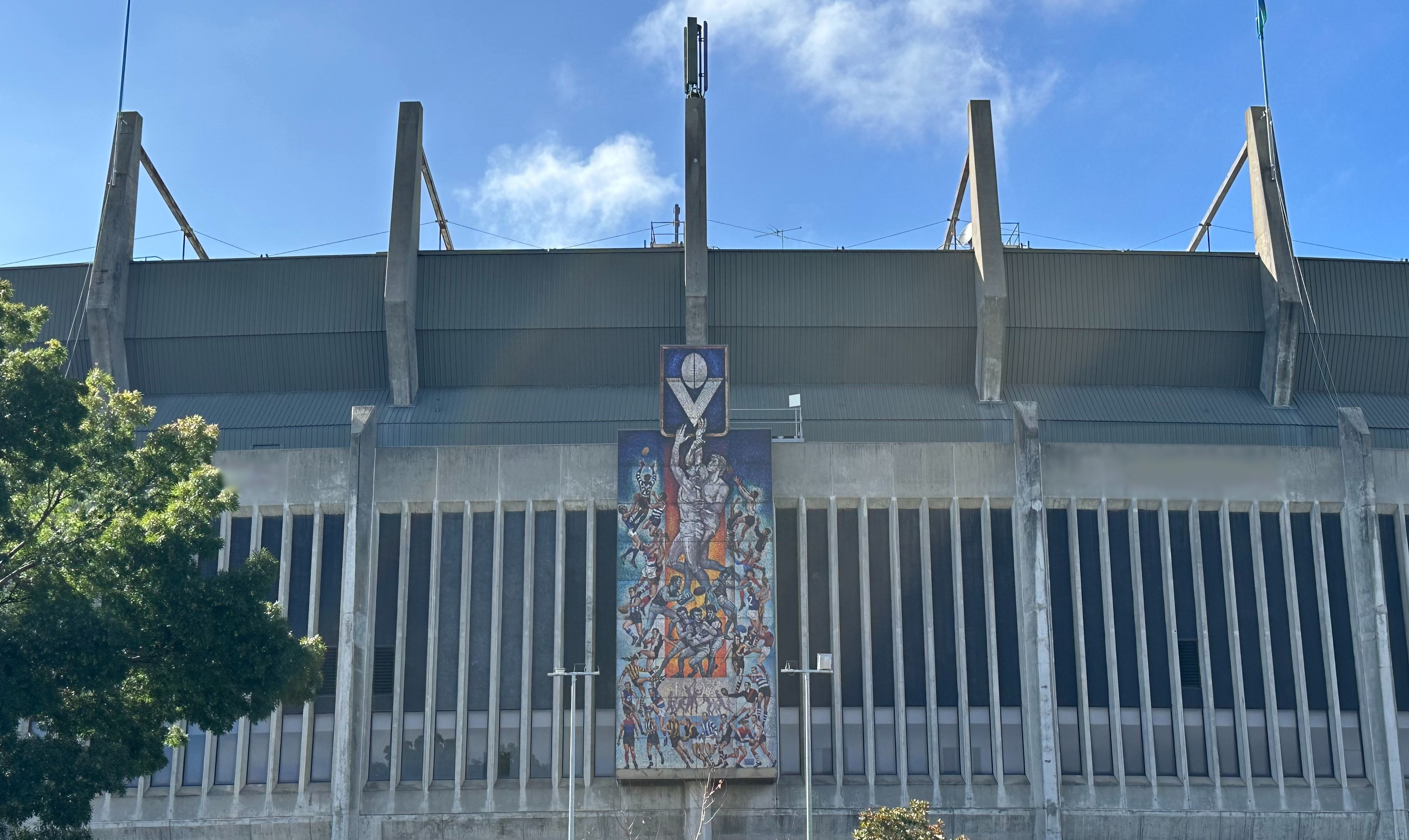
- Waverley Park, where the grand final took place

Hawthorn	West Coast
20.19 (139)	13.8 (86)
	1	2	3	4
HAW	3.4 (22)	7.12 (54)	12.15 (87)	20.19 (139)
WCE	5.1 (31)	7.2 (44)	12.5 (77)	13.8 (86)
- Date: 28 September 1991
- Stadium: Waverley Park
- Attendance: 75,230
- Favourite: West Coast
- Umpires: John Russo, Bryan Sheehan

Ceremonies
- National anthem: Daryl Braithwaite
- Halftime show: Angry Anderson

Accolades
- Norm Smith Medallist: Paul Dear (Hawthorn)
- Jock McHale Medallist: Alan Joyce

Broadcast in Australia
- Network: Seven Network
- Commentators: Sandy Roberts (host); Bruce McAvaney (commentator); Dennis Cometti (commentator); Don Scott (expert commentator); Peter McKenna (boundary rider); Bernie Quinlan (boundary rider); Ross Glendinning (analyst); Ian Robertson (analyst)

The 1991 AFL Grand Final was an Australian rules football game contested between the Hawthorn Football Club and West Coast Eagles, held at Waverley Park in Melbourne on 28 September 1991. It was the 95th annual grand final of the Australian Football League (formerly the Victorian Football League), staged to determine the premiers for the 1991 AFL season. The match, attended by 75,230 spectators, was won by Hawthorn by a margin of 53 points, marking that club's ninth premiership victory.

Reconstruction work at the larger Melbourne Cricket Ground, where most grand finals had been played since 1902, meant that the game was played at Waverley Park, marking the first and only time that this stadium hosted a premiership decider. The match was also the first grand final to feature a team (West Coast) based outside the state of Victoria.

== Background ==
Hawthorn had played the grand final in seven of the previous eight seasons, having most recently won the 1989 VFL Grand Final, while West Coast was playing in its first grand final ever, having entered the competition just four years previously. The Eagles came into the game as strong favourites, having played through the entire 1991 season as the leading team in the competition in which they won their first 12 games and finished three games clear on top of the ladder with a 19–3 record, earning their first McClelland Trophy. Hawthorn had finished second with a record of 16 wins and 6 losses. Though starting the season slowly, losing five of their first 11 games, they lost just one more game for the rest of the home-and-away season. The Eagles defeated the Hawks in both of their home-and-away encounters during the season, by 82 points at Princes Park in round 7 and 24 points at Subiaco Oval in round 22.

In the lead-up to the grand final, Hawthorn defeated West Coast by 23 points at Subiaco in the qualifying final. The Eagles subsequently defeated Melbourne by 38 points in the first semi-final, while Hawthorn defeated Geelong by two points in the second semi-final, sending the Hawks to the grand final. The Eagles defeated Geelong by 15 points in the preliminary final to take their place in the premiership decider.

== Teams ==
Hawthorn	West Coast

Hawthorn
B:	35 James Morrissey	24 Chris Langford	7 Gary Ayres
HB:	17 Michael Tuck (c)	2 Chris Mew	1 Ray Jencke
C:	18 Darrin Pritchard	15 Ben Allan	16 Andrew Gowers
HF:	33 Paul Hudson	23 Dermott Brereton	6 Tony Hall
F:	11 Darren Jarman	19 Jason Dunstall	13 Paul Dear
Foll:	12 Stephen Lawrence	3 Anthony Condon	44 John Platten
Int:	8 Dean Anderson	4 Andrew Collins	
Coach:	Alan Joyce		

West Coast
B:	24 John Worsfold (c)	14 Michael Brennan	17 Guy McKenna
HB:	7 Craig Turley	45 Andrew Lockyer	39 Chris Waterman
C:	3 Chris Mainwaring	13 Scott Watters	30 Peter Matera
HF:	1 Brett Heady	53 Ashley McIntosh	28 Chris Lewis
F:	48 Glen Jakovich	4 Peter Sumich	36 David Hart
Foll:	34 Dean Irving	9 Peter Wilson	10 Don Pyke
Int:	2 Dean Kemp	5 Dwayne Lamb	
Coach:	Mick Malthouse		

== Match summary ==
The game was played with what appeared as a four-goal breeze towards the main scoreboard end. Eagles captain John Worsfold won the toss and kicked with the wind.

=== First quarter ===
The ball moved up and down the field before the first of two 50-metre penalties conceded by Langford allowing Sumich to kick the first goal after ten minutes. A second penalty by Langford after a Sumich mark gave Sumich his second goal. A snap from Wilson in the pocket followed by a relay free kick to Heady stretched the margin out to four goals. A minute later Paul Dear ran into an open goal to give the Hawks their first. After the Hawks scored four behinds Sumich marked and kicked his third goal from outside 60 metres. Jason Dunstall scored a goal from a Ben Allan centreline clearance, then again Dunstall scored his second for the term from a free kick on the siren. The Eagles' lead was nine points at the first change.

=== Second quarter ===
With Hawthorn now kicking with the breeze, Dear marked consecutive kick ins and started dominating at Centre Half Forward. Goals to Dear and Darrin Pritchard saw the Hawks take the lead. After a couple more behinds from the Hawks, Tony Hall snapped a goal and the Hawthorn lead was fourteen points. Paul Hudson added the Hawks' sixth unanswered goal before the Eagles, through Sumich and Chris Lewis, reduced the Hawks' lead to ten points at the main break.

=== Third quarter ===
Both teams went goal for goal in this term, and the margin at three-quarter time was still ten points in Hawthorn's favour. Hawthorn had Stephen Lawrence winning the hit outs, and a dominating midfield negated any wind assistance the Eagles may have had. Heady kicked three goals for the quarter and Hawthorn's Dermott Brereton two.

=== Final quarter ===
The Hawks blew the game open in the final term, kicking eight goals to one. Brereton took two marks in the goal square in the first three minutes to put the Hawks 23 points ahead. Fatigue was now taking its toll on the Eagles, and four later goals to Dunstall and one to Sumich saw the Hawks win by 53 points.

The Norm Smith Medal was awarded to Hawthorn's Paul Dear for his workmanlike performance, especially in the tight first half. After the Eagles had started well, Dear was shifted to the half-forward line and not only kicked Hawthorn's first goal, but managed to quell the influence of Andrew Lockyer and Glen Jakovich by providing a foil for Dermott Brereton. He also backed up in the ruck when Stephen Lawrence had to be rested. Dear ended up with 18 kicks, eight handpasses and eight marks - 11 of those disposals and six of those marks came in the second quarter.

== Postscript ==
West Coast coach Michael Malthouse said after the game that "Hawthorn had been first to the ball and clearly won in the air".

Hawthorn's experience was seen as the decisive factor in their victory, and sparked a new club T-shirt: "Too old. Too slow. Too good." (Some commentators had previously thought the Hawks were 'too old and too slow' to ever win another premiership.) Hawthorn defender Gary Ayres made sarcastic reference to this in his post-match interview.

By failing to win the grand final, West Coast tied the record for the most home and away wins by a non-Premier (matching the record of 19 wins set by Collingwood in 1973). This record was subsequently broken by Geelong in 2008.

Hawthorn's flag closed a period in which the club won five premierships in nine years. The game also represented the final game of VFL/AFL football played by Michael Tuck. His record includes

- Most premierships by a player: 7
- Most grand finals by a player: 11
- Most finals by a player: 39
- Oldest premiership player: 38 years, 95 days.

== Game day entertainment ==
Before the game, Daryl Braithwaite sang both "Waltzing Matilda" and "Advance Australia Fair".

The day was also memorable for the half-time entertainment which featured a parade of sporting celebrities in Ford Capris to celebrate the upcoming 1992 Barcelona Olympics. Included in the parade were the 1991 Brownlow medallist Jim Stynes, the Oarsome Foursome, Jeff Fenech, Fighting Harada, Lionel Rose, Lisa Ondieki and her husband Yobes, and Susie Maroney. Champion marathon runner and then Head of the Australian Institute of Sport, Robert de Castella, and rock singer Angry Anderson were transported to the middle of the ground in a blue Batmobile-like vehicle with the AFL logo prominently displayed. De Castella gave a brief speech honouring Australia's Olympians and other sporting heroes before Anderson jumped from the Batmobile and took centre stage, belting out his hit song "Bound for Glory" and encouraging the crowd to sing along. However, Anderson notably struggled vocally during the performance, with Yobes Ondieki caught on camera laughing uncontrollably at Anderson's act. De Castella believed Anderson struggled with the venue's poor acoustics, while Anderson claimed he could not hear himself over the engine noise of the "Batmobile". Anderson's performance has since become the subject of derision, and footage of the performance featured in a satirical 2008 Carlton & United Breweries television advertisement, with the caption stating that "CUB is a proud supporter of AFL footy since 1877 (except for 1991)".

== Scorecard ==
Grand final
28 September (2:50 pm)	West Coast	def. by	Hawthorn	Waverley Park (crowd: 75,230)	Report
5.1 (31); 7.2 (44); 12.5 (77); 13.8 (86)	Q1; Q2; Q3; Final	3.4 (22); 7.12 (54); 12.15 (87); 20.19 (139)	Umpires: Sheehan, Russo; Norm Smith Medal: Paul Dear; Television broadcast: Seven Network; National anthem: Daryl Braithwaite
Sumich 5 Heady 4 Lewis 2 Wilson, Pyke 1	Goals	6 Dunstall; 4 Brereton; 2 Dear, Pritchard, Hudson; 1 Condon, Hall, Anderson, Morrissey
McKenna, Pyke, Mainwaring, Heady, Sumich	Best	Dear, Lawrence, Morrissey, Condon, Platten, Brereton, Mew, Ayres, Dunstall
Wilson (corked thigh)	Injuries	Nil
Nil	Reports	Condon (striking), Lawrence (striking)

== See also ==
- 2015 AFL Grand Final

== Bibliography ==
- Atkinson, Graeme; Atkinson, Brant (2009). The Complete Book of AFL Finals (4th ed.). Scoresby, Victoria: The Five Mile Press. ISBN 9781742112756.
- Main, Jim (2006). When it matters most : the Norm Smith Medallist and best on ground in every Grand Final. Melbourne, Victoria: Bas Publishing. ISBN 1920910689.
