= Mark Yeates (disambiguation) =

Mark Yeates is an Irish footballer.

Mark Yeates may also refer to:

- Mark Yeates (Australian footballer), Australian rules footballer

== See also ==
- Mark Yates (disambiguation)
