= Michael Schulze =

Michael Schulze may refer to:

- Michael Schulze (Australian footballer) (born 1962), Australian rules footballer
- Michael Schulze (footballer, born 1989), German footballer
