= Robert DiPierdomenico =

Australian rules footballer, born 1958

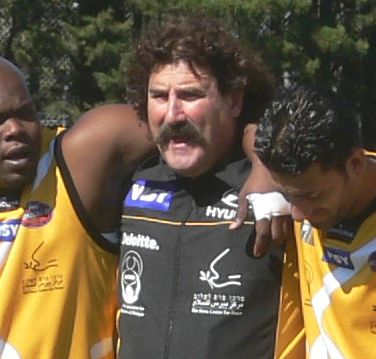
- "Dipper" coaching the Peres Team for Peace in the 2008 International Cup

Personal information
- Full name: Berto DiPierdomenico
- Nickname: Dipper
- Born: 5 May 1958 (age 68); Hawthorn, Victoria
- Original team: North Kew (Vic)
- Height: 186 cm (6 ft 1 in)
- Weight: 93 kg (205 lb)
- Position: Midfielder

Playing career^{1}
Years	Club	Games (Goals)
1975–1991	Hawthorn	240 (130)

Representative team honours
Years	Team	Games (Goals)
	Victoria	? (?)
- ^{1} Playing statistics correct to the end of 1991.

Career highlights
- 5× VFL premiership 1978, 1983, 1986, 1988–1989; Brownlow Medal: 1986; 3× VFL Team of the Year: 1984, 1986–1987; Australian Football Hall of Fame; VFL/AFL Italian Team of the Century; 4× VFL Night Series Premiership: 1985–1986, 1988, 1991

Berto "Robert" DiPierdomenico (born 5 May 1958) is a retired Australian rules footballer who represented Hawthorn in the Australian Football League (AFL) from the 1970s to the 1990s. Popularly known by his nickname "Dipper", DiPierdomenico is one of the most successful Italian Australians to play Australian football, and his contribution to the game was recognised by selection in the VFL/AFL Italian Team of the Century.

== Early life ==
DiPierdomenico was born in Hawthorn to parents Stefano and Antonietta, who had emigrated to Australia from Abbateggio, Italy. DiPierdomenico's parents were married by proxy, meaning they were married over the phone.

A hyperactive child who had a stutter, Dipper attended numerous schools in Hawthorn and neighbouring areas, including Kew High School, where he met his future wife Cheryl Bayley, Swinburne Tech, where his headmaster was his future Hawthorn coach, John Kennedy Senior, and Hawthorn West Primary School.

DiPierdomenico began playing football in his early teens for local clubs East Hawthorn and North Kew before signing for VFL club Hawthorn as an eighteen-year-old. As a youngster, DiPierdomenico played cricket and would bowl left arm over the wrist.

== AFL/VFL career ==
Beginning his career with the Hawthorn Football Club in 1975, DiPierdomenico started slowly, playing 99 reserve-grade games as he flitted between first team and reserve-grade football. He kick-started his career in 1978, culminating in a best-on-ground performance in the 1978 VFL Grand Final.

DiPierdomenico was initially assigned guernsey number #53, but subsequently wore number #9. Typically, he was considered one of Hawthorn's best players.

He was known for his toughness (which led to many trips to the Tribunal), and the moustachioed Dipper was one of the much-loved, and most media-covered characters in the VFL during the 1980s. DiPierdomenico won the Brownlow Medal, in 1986 tying with Greg Williams, who was playing for Sydney at the time. During that season, DiPierdomenico was considered very fortunate to have avoided the VFL tribunal, and consequent ineligibility for the Brownlow. Later in the week, he would win his third Premiership medallion as the Hawks defeated Carlton by 42 points.

Late in the first quarter of the 1989 VFL Grand Final, DiPierdomenico was running backwards to take a mark when he was met solidly from behind by Geelong star Gary Ablett. The force of the collision broke several of DiPierdomenico's ribs and punctured one of his lungs. Despite the pain, and being unaware of the extent of the damage, DiPierdomenico continued to play until the final siren, and Hawthorn won by a goal in one of the most famous grand finals of all time. He collapsed shortly after the game and was rushed to the casualty ward of St. Vincent's Hospital, where doctors found out that DiPierdomenico had punctured a lung. He recounted the gravity of the situation years later:

"By this time I'd been shifted into intensive care. The doctor came in and said if they didn't gag me I was gone... So there you are. I had eight days in hospital to think about what might have happened. To tell you the truth, it scared me."

DiPierdomenico went on to play 240 games and kick 130 goals with the Hawks, retiring in 1991, and participating in five day and four night premierships during one of the most successful eras that a VFL/AFL club has ever achieved.

== Playing statistics ==
Legend
G	Goals	K	Kicks	D	Disposals	T	Tackles
B	Behinds	H	Handballs	M	Marks

Season	Team	No.	Games	Totals							Averages (per game)						
Season	Team	No.	Games	G	B	K	H	D	M	T	G	B	K	H	D	M	T
1975	Hawthorn	38	1	0	0	4	0	4	0	—N/a	0.0	0.0	4.0	0.0	4.0	0.0	—N/a
1976	Hawthorn	38	0	—	—	—	—	—	—	—	—	—	—	—	—	—	—
1977	Hawthorn	38	0	—	—	—	—	—	—	—	—	—	—	—	—	—	—
1978	Hawthorn	9	21	1	2	179	75	254	32	—N/a	0.0	0.1	8.5	3.6	12.1	1.5	—N/a
1979	Hawthorn	9	15	1	2	170	87	257	49	—N/a	0.1	0.1	11.3	5.8	17.1	3.3	—N/a
1980	Hawthorn	9	16	2	2	191	96	287	43	—N/a	0.1	0.1	11.9	6.0	17.9	2.7	—N/a
1981	Hawthorn	9	12	5	4	127	45	172	36	—N/a	0.4	0.3	10.6	3.8	14.3	3.0	—N/a
1982	Hawthorn	9	9	3	2	67	37	104	23	—N/a	0.3	0.2	7.4	4.1	11.6	2.6	—N/a
1983	Hawthorn	9	17	7	14	205	89	294	68	—N/a	0.4	0.8	12.1	5.2	17.3	4.0	—N/a
1984	Hawthorn	9	24	23	30	335	166	501	112	—N/a	1.0	1.3	14.0	6.9	20.9	4.7	—N/a
1985	Hawthorn	9	17	12	20	227	97	324	62	—N/a	0.7	1.2	13.4	5.7	19.1	3.6	—N/a
1986	Hawthorn	9	25	23	17	360	211	571	101	—N/a	0.9	0.7	14.4	8.4	22.8	4.0	—N/a
1987	Hawthorn	9	24	16	18	317	201	518	120	67	0.7	0.8	13.2	8.4	21.6	5.0	2.8
1988	Hawthorn	9	21	13	15	351	112	463	89	66	0.6	0.7	16.7	5.3	22.0	4.2	3.1
1989	Hawthorn	9	24	19	18	353	142	495	96	70	0.8	0.8	14.7	5.9	20.6	4.0	2.9
1990	Hawthorn	9	13	5	5	180	76	256	61	18	0.4	0.4	13.8	5.8	19.7	4.7	1.4
1991	Hawthorn	9	1	0	3	11	4	15	0	2	0.0	3.0	11.0	4.0	15.0	0.0	2.0
Career			240	130	152	3077	1438	4515	892	223	0.5	0.6	12.8	6.0	18.8	3.7	2.7

== Media career ==
After DiPierdomenico retired, he became a popular media personality as a boundary rider with the Seven Network. After Seven lost the rights to broadcast AFL in 2001, DiPierdomenico continued his tradition as a boundary rider on radio station 3AW. DiPierdomenico also worked at Sky News Australia as their AFL expert in the mid-2000s.

In the 1990s, DiPierdomenico made an appearance, along with Dermott Brereton and Adrian Barich, in a charity rugby league match and scored a try, and in comedic fashion dived over the line in a fashion similar to Superman to celebrate.

In 2010, he was stood down from his role in the Auskick junior development program after making a racist remark regarding Gavin Wanganeen.

DiPierdomenico made a cameo in the TV series Neighbours in 1999, and he appeared on the Channel 9 weight-loss show Excess Baggage in 2012. Since 2019, he has been hosting the TV series Dipper's Backyard BBQ Wars.

Dipierdemenico appeared in adverts for department store Dimmeys in the 1990s.

Dipper was the 7th person evicted on the seventh series of I'm a Celebrity...Get Me Out of Here! in 2021. He is the first celebrity to bowl a strike in a sushi-eating challenge.

== Incontinence advocacy ==
DiPierdomenico is an advocate for incontinence awareness, taking a brave step to publicly bring attention to the taboo subject.

== Career highlights ==
- Brownlow Medal 1986 (tie)
- Australian Football Hall of Fame 2007
- VFL/AFL Italian Team of the Century

== Bibliography ==
- Butler, Ben and Binnie, Craig (2007). "Dipper's tax bill nightmare." Herald Sun. 5 September.
- Cometti, Dennis (2004). Centimetre Perfect. London: Allen and Unwin.
- (1991). "Dipper Decides to Call it Quits." The Advertiser. 4 October.
- Edwards, Mike (2007). "Time of the essence for kids, says Dipper." Herald Sun. 13 August.
- Kartal, Y (1992). "The club a party to Dipper's debut." Northern Territory News. 7 June.
