= Darren Flanigan =

Australian rules footballer

Personal information
- Full name: Darren Flanigan
- Born: 8 March 1962 (age 64)
- Original team: Katamatite
- Height: 200 cm (6 ft 7 in)
- Weight: 105 kg (231 lb)
- Position: Ruckman

Playing career^{1}
Years	Club	Games (Goals)
1981 – 1991	Geelong	130 (50)
1992	St Kilda	8 (4)
Total		138 (54)
- ^{1} Playing statistics correct to the end of 1992.

Darren Flanigan (born 8 March 1962) is a former Australian rules footballer who played with Geelong and St Kilda in the Victorian and Australian Football Leagues.

Flanigan came to Geelong from the Victorian town of Katamatite and during the early 1980s acted as their back up ruckman. He got more regular game time in 1985, the same year he was named in Victoria's interstate team. In 1989 Flanigan appeared in the VFL Grand Final, coming off the bench in the loss to Hawthorn. He finished his career with a season at St Kilda in 1992.

Flanigan is currently the AFL Victoria female football manager.
