= Chris Langford =

Australian rules footballer

Personal information
- Born: 2 January 1963 (age 63)
- Original team: Melbourne Grammar
- Height: 195 cm (6 ft 5 in)
- Weight: 92 kg (203 lb)
- Position: Defender

Playing career^{1}
Years	Club	Games (Goals)
1983–1997	Hawthorn	303 (33)
- ^{1} Playing statistics correct to the end of 1997.

Career highlights
- Club: 4× VFL/AFL premiership player: 1986, 1988, 1989, 1991; 4 × VFL/ AFL night series premiership: 1986, 1988, 1991, 1992; 4× All-Australian team: 1987, 1988, 1989, 1994; Hawthorn captain: 1994; 3× VFL Team of Year: 1987–1989; Australian Football Hall of Fame; Hawthorn Team of the Century; Hawthorn Hall of Fame; Representative: E. J. Whitten Medal: 1987, 1993

Chris Langford (born 2 January 1963) is a former professional Australian rules footballer who has been an AFL Commissioner since 1999.

== Player ==
Langford is best known for his 303-game career for the Hawthorn Football Club between 1983 and 1997.

Langford played his early games for Hawthorn on the wing or as the second ruckman. He had a good leap, which compensated for his lack of height. It was after the retirement of Peter Knights and David O'Halloran that he switched to full-back. It was that position in which he won his first All-Australian selection in 1987.

A defender, Langford won four premierships with Hawthorn, in 1986, 1988, 1989 and 1991. He captained the club in the 1994 season and earned a second All-Australian selection.

He holds a place on the interchange bench in Hawthorn's Team of the Century.

Late in his career, Langford moved to Sydney where he "did a Minton", working as an accountant and commuting to Melbourne to train and play with his club. In 2012, he moved back to Melbourne.

=== Merger game ===
Langford's antics at the end of the merger game against Melbourne in 1996 inspired many Hawthorn members to vote against the merger proposal. Langford (Hawthorn's full-back) took off his Hawthorn jumper and proudly held it above his head while leaving the field. Langford was only one of the active playing list to display his disapproval of the plan.

== Statistics ==
Legend
G	Goals	K	Kicks	D	Disposals	T	Tackles
B	Behinds	H	Handballs	M	Marks

Season	Team	No.	Games	Totals							Averages (per game)							Votes
Season	Team	No.	Games	G	B	K	H	D	M	T	G	B	K	H	D	M	T	Votes
1983	Hawthorn	28	11	3	9	105	66	171	39	—N/a	0.3	0.8	9.5	6.0	15.5	3.5	—N/a	0
1984	Hawthorn	28	22	17	19	185	62	247	54	—N/a	0.8	0.9	8.4	2.8	11.2	2.5	—N/a	1
1985	Hawthorn	28	22	2	7	190	74	264	62	—N/a	0.1	0.3	8.6	3.4	12.0	2.8	—N/a	0
1986†	Hawthorn	28	23	0	0	216	96	312	64	—N/a	0.0	0.0	9.4	4.2	13.6	2.8	—N/a	5
1987	Hawthorn	24	26	1	2	265	114	379	98	26	0.0	0.1	10.2	4.4	14.6	3.8	1.0	0
1988†	Hawthorn	24	22	2	1	223	77	300	75	16	0.1	0.0	10.1	3.5	13.6	3.4	0.7	5
1989†	Hawthorn	24	23	0	1	216	96	312	82	19	0.0	0.0	9.4	4.2	13.6	3.6	0.8	2
1990	Hawthorn	24	20	2	0	164	68	232	62	13	0.1	0.0	8.2	3.4	11.6	3.1	0.7	3
1991†	Hawthorn	24	25	0	0	231	86	317	72	29	0.0	0.0	9.2	3.4	12.7	2.9	1.2	2
1992	Hawthorn	24	23	4	0	185	79	264	49	20	0.2	0.0	8.0	3.4	11.5	2.1	0.9	0
1993	Hawthorn	24	21	0	0	192	85	277	50	38	0.0	0.0	9.1	4.0	13.2	2.4	1.8	4
1994	Hawthorn	24	18	0	3	132	87	219	64	22	0.0	0.2	7.3	4.8	12.2	3.6	1.2	11
1995	Hawthorn	24	18	0	1	160	79	239	54	21	0.0	0.1	8.9	4.4	13.3	3.0	1.2	2
1996	Hawthorn	24	21	1	0	248	58	306	97	30	0.0	0.0	11.8	2.8	14.6	4.6	1.4	3
1997	Hawthorn	24	8	1	2	77	21	98	32	6	0.1	0.3	9.6	2.6	12.3	4.0	0.8	0
Career			303	33	45	2789	1148	3937	954	240	0.1	0.1	9.2	3.8	13.0	3.1	1.1	38

== Career ==
After his career, he moved into game administration and was appointed to the AFL Commission in 1999.

== Personal life ==
Chris' son Will was recruited to Hawthorn in the 2011 Rookie draft, and was upgraded to the Hawthorn senior list in June 2013. Will played in the 2014 premiership with the Hawks, with the Langfords becoming the second father–son premiership players at the club after Peter and Paul Hudson in 1971 and 1991, respectively.

His son Lachlan was selected in the 2014 rookie draft but never played a game; he played four games for Box Hill in 2016.
