= Darren Morgan (Australian footballer) =

Australian rules footballer

Personal information
- Full name: Darren Morgan
- Born: 10 April 1965 (age 61)
- Original team: Belmont
- Height: 180 cm (5 ft 11 in)
- Weight: 72 kg (159 lb)

Playing career^{1}
Years	Club	Games (Goals)
1984–1990	Geelong	92 (69)
- ^{1} Playing statistics correct to the end of 1990.

Darren Morgan (born 10 April 1965) is a former Australian rules footballer who played with Geelong in the Victorian/Australian Football League (VFL/AFL).

Morgan came from Belmont and put in some good performances for Geelong in his debut season, including being best on ground against Richmond in just his third appearance.

A speedster, he missed just one game in 1985, and the following year he averaged a career-high 17 disposals.

He didn't see much action in 1987 and 1988 but played 21 games as a half back in 1989. In a game against West Coast at Kardinia Park that year, Morgan kicked five goals, which equaled the combined efforts of star forwards Gary Ablett and Billy Brownless. Although he played in the 1989 Qualifying Final, Morgan didn't take any further part in Geelong's run to the grand final. He would likely have played in the premiership decider had David Cameron not recovered from his shoulder injury in time.

After the 1990 season, Morgan was traded to the Sydney Swans. He however refused to make the move and instead spent the season at Werribee where he was their joint "Best and Fairest" winner. In the 1991 AFL draft he was again traded, this time to Footscray, in return for the 68th pick in the draft. Morgan didn't play a single senior game for Footscray.
