= Mark Yates =

Mark or Marc Yates may refer to:

- Mark Yates (footballer) (born 1970), English football manager and former player
- Mark Yates (born 1968), guitarist for Terrorvision
- Marc Yates, Jersey sport shooter at the 2010 Commonwealth Games

== See also ==
- Mark Yeates (disambiguation)
