= Bradley Plain =

Australian rules footballer

Personal information
- Full name: Bradley Plain
- Born: 25 September 1969 (age 57)
- Original team: North Hobart Football Club (TFL Statewide)
- Height: 184 cm (6 ft 0 in)
- Weight: 82 kg (181 lb)
- Position: Forward

Playing career^{1}
Years	Club	Games (Goals)
1988–93	Essendon	46 (89)
1994	Collingwood	9 (6)
1996	North Melbourne	1 (1)
Total		56 (96)
- ^{1} Playing statistics correct to the end of 1996.

Bradley Plain (born 25 September 1969) is a former Australian rules footballer who played for Essendon, Collingwood and North Melbourne in the Australian Football League (AFL).

Born in Tasmania, Plain played his early football with TFL Statewide side North Hobart before crossing to fellow TFL club Clarence. Recruited by Essendon, Plain kicked 27 goals for Essendon in the 1989 VFL season and took part in their finals campaign, which ended in the Preliminary Final. He bettered that tally in 1991 with 28 goals, including an eight-goal haul in a win over Sydney at the Sydney Cricket Ground (SCG). This performance earned him three Brownlow Medal votes, one of two occasions he received best on ground honour during his career with the other coming for a 34 disposals game against St Kilda in 1989.

An ankle injury kept him out of the finals series in 1991 and despite contributing 23 goals from just seven games in Essendon's premiership year of 1993, he again missed out on September action through injury.

Plain was traded to Collingwood in 1994 but failed to make an impact. In the 1996 season, Plain found himself at North Melbourne after being traded again, for Adrian McAdam. The forward made only one appearance due to the strength of the North Melbourne side and for the second time of his career was with a club during a premiership year but didn't participate in the finals.

Plain represented the Tasmania State of Origin team at the 1988 Adelaide Bicentennial Carnival.

== Bibliography ==
- Bradley Plain's playing statistics from AFL Tables
- Holmesby, Russell and Main, Jim (2007). The Encyclopedia of AFL Footballers. 7th ed. Melbourne: Bas Publishing.
