= Andrew Manning =

Australian rules footballer

Personal information
- Full name: Andrew Manning
- Born: 23 November 1966 (age 59)
- Original team: Daylesford
- Height: 185 cm (6 ft 1 in)
- Weight: 80 kg (176 lb)

Playing career^{1}
| Years | Club | Games (Goals) |
| 1985–1988 | St Kilda | 31 (23) |
| 1989–1991 | Essendon | 25 (20) |
| Total | | 56 (43) |
- ^{1} Playing statistics correct to the end of 1991.

Andrew Manning (born 23 November 1966) is a former Australian rules footballer who played for St Kilda and Essendon in the Victorian Football League (VFL), which later became the Australian Football League (AFL).

== Career ==
Manning, recruited from Daylesford as a half forward flanker, made his league debut in the 1985 VFL season. The 18-year-old appeared in 19 of a possible 22 games that year but struggled with fitness problems in subsequent seasons. He played only twice in 1987 and, after making just one further appearance in 1988, was dropped from St Kilda's list mid-season.

He joined Essendon for the 1989 season but did not make his debut for the club until round 18. His second and third appearances for Essendon came in the semi-final and preliminary final. He featured prominently in the semi-final loss to Hawthorn, collecting 18 disposals and a goal, and was struck by Peter Schwab during the match—an incident which cost the future Hawthorn coach his place in the premiership team.

In 1990 he became a regular in the Essendon side and averaged 16 disposals per game. He recorded just eight disposals in Essendon's preliminary final win over the West Coast Eagles and subsequently lost his place in the team for the grand final to Peter Somerville.
