= Andrew Collins (footballer, born 1965) =

Australian rules footballer and coach (born 1965)

Andy Collins
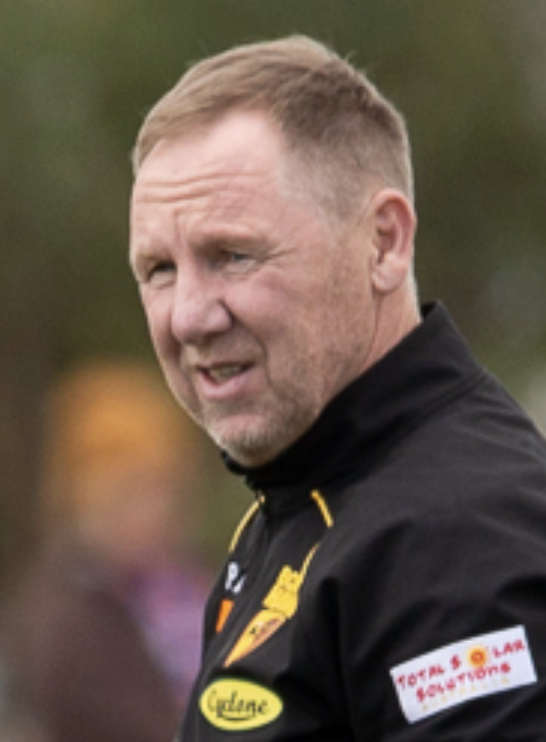
- Collins in 2025

Personal information
- Full name: Andrew Collins
- Born: 25 April 1965 (age 61)
- Original team: Doncaster Heights
- Height: 174 cm (5 ft 9 in)
- Weight: 75 kg (165 lb)

Playing career^{1}
Years	Club	Games (Goals)
1985–1986	Sandringham	18 (16)
1987–1996	Hawthorn	212 (37)
Total		230 (53)

Representative team honours
Years	Team	Games (Goals)
- Victoria
- ^{1} Playing statistics correct to the end of 1996.

Career highlights
- Playing: 3× VFL/AFL premiership player: 1988, 1989, 1991; 1× VFL Team of Year: 1990; Peter Crimmins Memorial Trophy: 1990; Coaching: 2× VFL premiership coach: 1997, 2015

Andrew Collins (born 25 April 1965) is an Australian rules football coach and former player who is currently the director of coaching at the Port Adelaide Football Club. He played for the Hawthorn Football Club in the Victorian/Australian Football League (VFL/AFL).

Collins was a rugged back pocket defender. He began his senior career in the Victorian Football Association with the Sandringham Football Club, where he was a member of the club's 1985 premiership team. He was signed by VFL/AFL club Hawthorn, and played 212 games over ten years with the club, winning three premierships. His durability allowed him to play a club record 189 games in succession.

He finished equal fifth in the 1990 Brownlow Medal, the same year he was awarded the Peter Crimmins Medal as Hawthorn's best and fairest player. His last game was the "merger game" between Hawthorn and Melbourne in 1996, in which he got reported and ultimately suspended, thus ending his consecutive run of games.

When Collins retired from league football at the end of 1996, he turned to coaching. He returned to his old club Sandringham in the VFL, and coached there for two years, leading the club to the premiership in 1997. He served as an assistant coach at AFL club St Kilda from 2000 to 2003, then as an assistant coach at Hawthorn in 2004 and 2005. While at Hawthorn, he also coached its VFL-affiliate Box Hill. In 2006 and 2007 he coached VFL club Coburg, taking the team to a losing grand final in 2007.

In 2008, Collins moved to South Australia and coached South Australian National Football League (SANFL) club West Adelaide for six years from 2008 to 2013. He led the club to the 2012 SANFL Grand Final where they were defeated by Norwood, and he coached the Bloods to win the 2013 Foxtel Cup over Western Australian Football League (WAFL) side East Fremantle.

In 2014, Collins returned to Victoria and signed to coach VFL club Williamstown in its first season as a standalone club not affiliated with an AFL club. He led the club to a premiership in 2015. Collins would lead the club to another Grand Final in 2019 where Williamstown would lose by 3 points. The following year, Collins would depart the club to join Box Hill as an assistant coach. Following the 2021 season, Collins would be appointed as the head of development with Hawthorn under new coach Sam Mitchell who he had worked with at Box Hill.

At the end of the 2025 season, Collins accepted a position as director of coaching at Port Adelaide.

== Statistics ==
Legend
G	Goals	K	Kicks	D	Disposals	T	Tackles
B	Behinds	H	Handballs	M	Marks

Season	Team	No.	Games	Totals							Averages (per game)							Votes
Season	Team	No.	Games	G	B	K	H	D	M	T	G	B	K	H	D	M	T	Votes
1987	Hawthorn	40	8	1	3	71	56	127	16	15	0.1	0.4	8.9	7.0	15.9	2.0	1.9	0
1988^{#}	Hawthorn	40	21	8	3	180	122	302	45	46	0.4	0.1	8.6	5.8	14.4	2.1	2.2	0
1989^{#}	Hawthorn	4	24	4	1	250	138	388	50	63	0.2	0.0	10.4	5.8	16.2	2.1	2.6	9
1990	Hawthorn	4	23	5	1	273	120	393	81	54	0.2	0.0	11.9	5.2	17.1	3.5	2.3	15
1991^{#}	Hawthorn	4	25	6	8	227	133	360	54	59	0.2	0.3	9.1	5.3	14.4	2.2	2.4	4
1992	Hawthorn	4	23	6	5	241	128	369	86	48	0.3	0.2	10.5	5.6	16.0	3.7	2.1	3
1993	Hawthorn	5	21	3	4	208	104	312	65	62	0.1	0.2	9.9	5.0	14.9	3.1	3.0	0
1994	Hawthorn	5	23	0	0	182	126	308	60	56	0.0	0.0	7.9	5.5	13.4	2.6	2.4	1
1995	Hawthorn	5	22	1	1	189	98	287	41	49	0.0	0.0	8.6	4.5	13.0	1.9	2.2	1
1996	Hawthorn	5	22	3	1	157	102	259	35	55	0.1	0.0	7.1	4.6	11.8	1.6	2.5	0
Career			212	37	27	1978	1127	3105	533	507	0.2	0.1	9.3	5.3	14.6	2.5	2.4	33

== Honours and achievements ==
=== Playing ===
Team

- 3× VFL/AFL premiership player (Hawthorn): 1988, 1989, 1991
- 2× Minor premiership (Hawthorn): 1988, 1989

Individual

- Peter Crimmins Memorial Medal: 1990
- 4× Victoria Australian rules football team: 1990, 1991, 1992, 1994

=== Coaching ===
- VFL premiership coach (Sandringham): 1997
- VFL premiership coach (Williamstown): 2015
