= Jamie Duursma =

Australian rules footballer

Personal information
- Full name: Jamie Duursma
- Born: 14 November 1963 (age 62)
- Original team: Sandringham (VFA)
- Height: 190 cm (6 ft 3 in)
- Weight: 87 kg (192 lb)
- Position: Defender

Playing career^{1}
Years	Club	Games (Goals)
1985–1986	Sydney Swans	25 (4)
1987	Brisbane Bears	1 (0)
1988–1989	Melbourne	33 (0)
Total		59 (4)
- ^{1} Playing statistics correct to the end of 1989.

Career highlights
- Goulburn Valley League Premiership: 1992

Jamie Duursma (born 14 November 1963) is a former Australian rules footballer who played with the Sydney Swans, Brisbane Bears and Melbourne in the Victorian Football League (VFL) during the mid to late 1980s.

Duursma, after stints with the Hawthorn reserves and Victorian Football Association (VFA) club Sandringham, was recruited by Sydney and his VFL debut in 1985.

Duursma transferred to Brisbane for their inaugural VFL season in 1987 but only made one appearance in the seniors before being delisted at the end of the 1987 season. He was drafted by Melbourne in 1988 and was centre half back in their losing 1988 Grand Final team. His career was hampered by knee injuries.

Duursma briefly returned to Sandringham before moving to Goulburn Valley Football League (GVFL) club Rochester, where he played in a premiership in 1992.

Duursma is currently employed at Concept Logistics as the state sales manager.
