= Peter Curran (footballer) =

Australian rules footballer

Personal information
- Born: 15 July 1962 (age 64)
- Original team: Canterbury/Marcellin College
- Height: 195 cm (6 ft 5 in)
- Weight: 89 kg (196 lb)

Playing career^{1}
Years	Club	Games (Goals)
1983–1990	Hawthorn	109 (196)
1991–1992	Brisbane Bears	14 (8)
Total		123 (204)
- ^{1} Playing statistics correct to the end of 1992.

Career highlights
- Hawthorn premiership side: 1986, 1989; Brisbane Bears reserves premiership side: 1991

Peter Curran (born 15 July 1962) is a former Australian rules footballer who played with Hawthorn and the Brisbane Bears in the VFL/AFL.

A courageous strong-marking forward, Curran played an important part in the most successful era in Hawthorn's history, the 1980s. After a disappointing loss in the 1984 Grand Final, Curran found greater success in 1985, playing in the upset 9 point win over Essendon in the Foster's Cup night Grand Final and in the come-from-behind reserves Grand Final victory against Carlton. He was a member of their premiership sides in 1986 and 1989. In the 1989 Grand Final he contributed 3 goals.

Although he never kicked over 50 goals in a season he came close, managing 46 in 1984 and 44 in 1987. He moved to Brisbane in 1991 and joined the Bears, playing with the club for his final two seasons. He won a reserves premiership with the club in 1991.

After his playing career ended he tried various coaching jobs before eventually securing the job of Adelaide Crows assistant coach, and later Melbourne. He is currently employed as a Senior Years English teacher and Head Coach of Football at Wesley College, Melbourne. His brother Danny is a successful racehorse trainer and Peter's son, Tom Curran was drafted by North Melbourne in the 2011 AFL draft after Alastair Clarkson rejected him under the father-son rule.
