= Dean Anderson =

Australian rules footballer (born 1967)

Personal information
- Born: 1 August 1967 (age 59)
- Original team: Caulfield Grammar
- Debut: 1988, Hawthorn
- Height: 190 cm (6 ft 3 in)
- Weight: 88 kg (194 lb)

Playing career^{1}
Years	Club	Games (Goals)
1988 – 1992	Hawthorn	83 (74)
1993 – 1996	St Kilda	67 (27)
Total		150 (100)

Representative team honours
Years	Team	Games (Goals)
1988 – 1996	Victoria	2 (0)
- ^{1} Playing statistics correct to the end of 1996.

Career highlights
- 2× AFL premiership player: 1989, 1991

Dean Anderson (born 1 August 1967) is a former Australian rules footballer who played for Hawthorn and St Kilda in the Australian Football League. Dean is now the chief executive officer at Leading Teams.

== Personal life ==
Anderson's son, Noah, was drafted by the Gold Coast Suns with the second pick in the 2019 AFL draft.

== Hawthorn ==
A footballer who could run all day, Anderson was recruited from Caulfield Grammar. He played as a half forward and kicked four goals in Hawthorn's 1989 Grand Final triumph. He was also one of the better players in the 1991 Grand Final win.

== St Kilda ==
Anderson crossed to St Kilda in 1993 where he played another 67 games before retiring.

== See also ==
- List of Caulfield Grammar School people
