= Mark Bos =

Australian rules footballer

Personal information
- Born: 28 July 1960 (age 66)
- Original team: Wandella
- Debut: Round 6, 1979, Geelong vs. Footscray
- Height: 185 cm (6 ft 1 in)
- Weight: 84 kg (185 lb)

Playing career^{1}
Years	Club	Games (Goals)
1979–1989	Geelong	195 (16)
- ^{1} Playing statistics correct to the end of 1989.

Mark Bos (born 28 July 1960) is a former Australian rules footballer who played for Geelong in the Victorian Football League (VFL) from 1979 to 1989.

Bos made his senior VFL debut during the 1979 VFL season, and playing on the half back flank, won consecutive Carji Greeves Medals for Geelong's Best and Fairest in 1987 and 1988.

He retired at the end of the 1989 VFL season at the relatively young age of 29 to pursue interests beyond football.
