= Robert Scott (Australian footballer) =

Australian rules footballer

Personal information
- Born: 1 March 1969 (age 57)
- Original team: Torquay Football Club (BFL)
- Height: 173 cm (5 ft 8 in)
- Weight: 78 kg (172 lb)

Playing career^{1}
Years	Club	Games (Goals)
1986–1994	Geelong	132 (164)
1995–2000	North Melbourne	113 (58)
Total		245 (222)
- ^{1} Playing statistics correct to the end of 2000.

Career highlights
- Kangaroos premiership player 1996

Robert Scott (born 1 March 1969) is a former Australian rules footballer who played with the Geelong Football Club and North Melbourne in the AFL.

As part of John Devine's recruiting drive that would yield good results in the future, Scott was recruited from Torquay. Starting as a goal sneak earlier in his career, he used his blistering pace to speed away from opponents to kick goals. As he matured and gained fitness, he was using sparingly in the midfield.

He once famously had a set shot after the siren to win the match for Geelong against Sydney Swans at Kardinia Park, but hit the post, resulting in a 3-point loss.

At the end of 1994, Scott was traded from Geelong to North Melbourne, with Geelong receiving Brad Sholl in return.

He played in North Melbourne's 1996 Premiership Victory, after having played in losing Grand Finals with Geelong in 1989 and 1992.

Scott would experience Grand Final defeat in 1998 as North Melbourne lost to the Adelaide Crows.

In 1999, Scott would miss out on selection for the Kangaroos eventual Grand Final victory over Carlton. According to Captain Wayne Carey post-match, was "very unlucky to miss out".

His son Bailey was drafted by North Melbourne as a father-son recruit in 2018 National Draft with 49th pick.

== Statistics ==
Legend
G	Goals	K	Kicks	D	Disposals	T	Tackles
B	Behinds	H	Handballs	M	Marks

Season	Team	No.	Games	Totals							Averages (per game)							Votes
Season	Team	No.	Games	G	B	K	H	D	M	T	G	B	K	H	D	M	T	Votes
1986	Geelong	50	2	0	1	3	4	7	0	—N/a	0.0	0.5	1.5	2.0	3.5	0.0	—N/a	0
1987	Geelong	45	12	10	5	115	65	180	28	27	0.8	0.4	9.6	5.4	15.0	2.3	2.3	1
1988	Geelong	8	20	15	22	272	147	419	52	33	0.8	1.1	13.6	7.4	21.0	2.6	1.7	7
1989	Geelong	8	23	42	24	217	176	393	66	43	1.8	1.0	9.4	7.7	17.1	2.9	1.9	6
1990	Geelong	8	14	17	20	145	70	215	32	20	1.2	1.4	10.4	5.0	15.4	2.3	1.4	2
1991	Geelong	8	8	6	7	86	68	154	16	11	0.8	0.9	10.8	8.5	19.3	2.0	1.4	1
1992	Geelong	8	24	42	21	295	166	461	74	50	1.8	0.9	12.3	6.9	19.2	3.1	2.1	3
1993	Geelong	8	20	27	12	206	143	349	43	51	1.4	0.6	10.3	7.2	17.5	2.2	2.6	5
1994	Geelong	8	9	5	3	91	38	129	21	13	0.6	0.3	10.1	4.2	14.3	2.3	1.4	0
1995	North Melbourne	8	25	17	18	215	106	321	36	44	0.7	0.7	8.6	4.2	12.8	1.4	1.8	0
1996†	North Melbourne	8	24	13	9	219	132	351	47	50	0.5	0.4	9.1	5.5	14.6	2.0	2.1	1
1997	North Melbourne	8	25	14	15	216	140	356	49	35	0.6	0.6	8.6	5.6	14.2	2.0	1.4	3
1998	North Melbourne	8	22	6	3	193	76	269	27	43	0.3	0.1	8.8	3.5	12.2	1.2	2.0	1
1999	Kangaroos	8	16	8	4	83	38	121	19	16	0.5	0.3	5.2	2.4	7.6	1.2	1.0	0
2000	Kangaroos	8	1	0	0	0	0	0	0	1	0.0	0.0	0.0	0.0	0.0	0.0	1.0	0
Career			245	222	164	2356	1369	3725	510	437	0.9	0.7	9.6	5.6	15.2	2.1	1.8	30
