= David Cameron (Australian footballer) =

Australian rules footballer

Personal information
- Full name: David Cameron
- Born: 4 April 1964 (age 62)
- Original team: Echuca
- Height: 185 cm (6 ft 1 in)
- Weight: 79 kg (174 lb)
- Position: Forward

Playing career^{1}
Years	Club	Games (Goals)
1986–1990	Geelong	41 (71)
1991	Brisbane Bears	15 (26)
Total		56 (97)
- ^{1} Playing statistics correct to the end of 1991.

David Cameron (born 4 April 1964) is a former Australian rules footballer who played with Geelong and the Brisbane Bears in the VFL/AFL.

Cameron came to Geelong from Echuca and had a solid second season, kicking 28 goals in 1987. That tally included a bag of eight goals against North Melbourne at the MCG to help spoil Donald McDonald and Andrew Demetriou's 100th games. He was used mostly at half forward but played as a forward pocket in the 1989 VFL Grand Final. Cameron, along with Shane Hamilton, was traded to Brisbane in return for the first selection in the 1990 AFL draft. In 1991, his only season at the club, he kicked 26 goals.
