= James Morrissey (footballer) =

Australian rules footballer

Personal information
- Born: 4 October 1964 (age 62)
- Original team: Old Xaverians (VAFA)
- Height: 184 cm (6 ft 0 in)
- Weight: 90 kg (198 lb)

Playing career^{1}
Years	Club	Games (Goals)
1984–1993	Hawthorn	106 (100)
- ^{1} Playing statistics correct to the end of 1993.

Career highlights
- Hawthorn premiership player 1988, 1989, 1991

James Morrissey (born 4 October 1964) is a former Australian rules footballer who represented Hawthorn in the Australian Football League (AFL) during the 1980s and 1990s.

He was nicknamed 'The Freak' by his teammates for his ability to kick amazing goals.

Morrissey debuted for Hawthorn during the latter part of the 1984 season but did not play another senior game until 1987. He was a member of three Premiership sides in his nine seasons at the Hawks. Morrissey managed to kick a goal in all three grand finals he played in.

Morrissey was initially used as an interchange player that when on the ground would roam the wing and half forward line. He had the ability to do things on the ground that other players just couldn't believe, hence the nick-name of 'The Freak'.

In 1991 he was moved to the backline and he proved to be an effective defender. He kept West Coast forward Chris Lewis quiet in the 1991 Grand Final and was among Hawthorn's best that day.

His form dropped away in 1993 and was delisted at the end of that year.

Morrissey was a school teacher by profession and also created an AFL board game that was sold commercially.
