= Terry Hecker =

Australian rules footballer

Personal information
- Full name: Terry Hecker
- Born: 6 January 1970 (age 56)
- Original team: Lalor
- Height: 183 cm (6 ft 0 in)
- Weight: 74 kg (163 lb)

Playing career^{1}
Years	Club	Games (Goals)
1989, 1992	Collingwood	6 (1)
- ^{1} Playing statistics correct to the end of 1992.

Terry Hecker (born 6 January 1970) is a former Australian rules footballer who played with Collingwood in the Victorian Football League (VFL).

Hecker made his VFL debut in Collingwood's round 18 win over the West Coast Eagles in 1989. He kept his place in the team for the elimination final but then didn't play a senior game until 1992, when he made four appearances early in the season.
