= Chris Mew =

Australian rules footballer (born 1961)

Personal information
- Born: 7 May 1961 (age 65)
- Original team: Rosebud
- Height: 191 cm (6 ft 3 in)
- Weight: 90 kg (198 lb)

Playing career^{1}
Years	Club	Games (Goals)
1980–1992	Hawthorn	230 (21)
- ^{1} Playing statistics correct to the end of 1992.

Career highlights
- Hawthorn premiership player (1983, 1986, 1988, 1989 and 1991); 1x VFL Team of Year: 1984

Chris Mew (born 7 May 1961) is a former Australian rules footballer who played for Hawthorn in the Victorian/Australian Football League.

A defender, Mew usually played at centre half-back and was a five-time premiership player, in 1983, 1986, 1988, 1989 and 1991.

He retired after the 1989 season but was talked into returning by weekly visits from his coach Allan Jeans.

At the start of 1993, without playing a game, he ruptured his Achilles tendon and retired immediately.

Mew was named as a centre half-back in Hawthorn's official 'Team of the Century'.
