= Dermott Brereton =

Australian rules footballer, born 1964

Personal information
- Full name: Dermott Hugh Brereton
- Nicknames: The Kid, Derm, Dermie
- Born: 19 August 1964 (age 62)
- Original team: Frankston Rovers (Vic)
- Height: 186 cm (6 ft 1 in)
- Weight: 93 kg (205 lb)
- Position: Centre half-forward

Playing career^{1}
Years	Club	Games (Goals)
1982–1993	Hawthorn	189 (427)
1994	Sydney	7 (7)
1995	Collingwood	15 (30)
Total		211 (464)

Representative team honours
Years	Team	Games (Goals)
1984–1990	Victoria	9 (18)
- ^{1} Playing statistics correct to the end of 1995.

Career highlights
- Club: 5 × VFL/AFL premiership player: 1983, 1986, 1988, 1989, 1991; Peter Crimmins Memorial Trophy: 1985; 2 × VFL Team of the Year: 1986, 1988; 5 × VFL/ AFL night series premiership: 1985, 1986, 1988, 1991, 1992; All-Australian team: 1985; AFL Hall of Fame; Hawthorn Team of the Century; Hawthorn Hall of Fame

Dermott Hugh Brereton (born 19 August 1964) is a former Australian rules footballer who played for the Hawthorn Football Club, Sydney Swans and Collingwood Football Club in the Australian Football League (AFL).

Born to Irish immigrant parents, Brereton is regarded as one of the key members of Hawthorn's era of dominance in the 1980s. A centre half-forward with strong marking skills and a reliable kick for goal, Brereton was renowned for his flamboyant style and rugged on-field conduct, which resulted in frequent visits to the Tribunal. He also represented Victoria in State of Origin matches, and both played for and coached Australia in the International Rules Series. He was recognised for his on-field achievements when he was inducted into the Australian Football Hall of Fame in 1999. He has since become a respected member of the football media, working for various TV and radio stations in Melbourne covering the AFL as a commentator and analyst.

== Early years and family ==
Brereton's parents, Dermott Joseph Brereton and Jean Nancy Austin, were both born in Dublin and emigrated to Australia. Dermott arrived in 1958 and Jean a year later. They had three sons.

In an article published by the Herald Sun in 2010, Brereton revealed to journalist Mark Robinson about his father's dark past, cocaine addiction and 1993 suicide. Dermott's brother Paul also committed suicide. (He has another brother, David.) Brereton revealed the physical abuse he suffered from his father, who was himself abused by the Christian Brothers.

== VFL/AFL career ==
=== Hawthorn (1982–1992) ===
Dermott Brereton featured on the cover of the Inside the Battle of '89 DVD in a memorable-moment pose after recovering from a solid Mark Yeates shirtfront. Brereton, nicknamed "The Kid", played most of his career (189 games and 427 goals) in the centre half forward position at the Hawthorn Football Club, where he formed part of a potent forward line that included champion players such as Jason Dunstall. His debut was against North Melbourne in the 1982 finals series—he kicked five goals and assisted in a few more.

Brereton had a reputation as a tough player, and as a big-game performer was an important player in a number of Hawthorn's grand final teams during the 1980s (including premierships in 1983, 1986, 1988, 1989 and 1991).

Brereton was known for his bustling style and strong marking abilities and off-the-ball scuffles. He won Hawthorn's best-and-fairest award in 1985 and was the team's leading goalkicker in the same year. He achieved All-Australian status in 1985. Having bulked up over his career, Brereton became a football punisher and was known for his aggressive hip-and-shoulder bumps on running players. His targeting of other players by this method led to the charging rule being instigated to protect players whose intention was to focus on the ball.

A famous incident in 1988 involved Hawthorn's rival Essendon at Waverley Park. Brereton ran through Essendon's three-quarter-time huddle, much to the surprise of the Bomber players, causing a scuffle to break out. This incident was in retaliation to a free kick paid against Brereton for kissing Essendon's Billy Duckworth while Jason Dunstall lined up for goal. Dunstall kicked the goal; however, due to Brereton's indiscretion, the goal was disallowed. Brereton, fuming, ran through Essendon's huddle as an act of retaliation. Post-match, Essendon's coach, Kevin Sheedy, shrugged off the event as insignificant, quipping: "Just another mad Irishman!"

Perhaps the most memorable moment of his playing career was the 1989 VFL Grand Final, which was featured in a Toyota Memorable Moments television commercial. In one of the toughest grand finals in the league's history, Brereton was lined up at the centre bounce by Geelong Football Club's Mark Yeates and hit with a solid shirtfront. Severely winded and concussed, he was attended to by trainers. He began to vomit before jogging back into the play. Only minutes later in the game, he marked and kicked an inspirational goal. He would finish with three goals in a game that Hawthorn would win by six points. He was later diagnosed with broken ribs.

During his career at Hawthorn, Brereton was selected to play representative State of Origin football for Victoria nine times and kicked a total of 18 goals in this format.

His physical style of play came at a cost. By the end of 1992, he was suffering from crippling chronic hip pain and struggled to make regular appearances. He didn't play a game in 1993; and, at the end of the season, when offered a minimum-wage contract, decided to leave the club.

You'd look to take somebody out, and wilfully take them out, within the rules.

— Dermott Brereton commenting on his style of football

Brereton walked out on Hawthorn in October 1993 following a pay dispute, stating that the offer made by the club insulted him.

=== Sydney Swans (1994) ===
The struggling Sydney Swans under coach Ron Barassi were in need of a big-name player capable of helping to turn around the team's performance as well as draw crowds to their home games at the SCG. In November 1993 the club offered Brereton a 3 year contract which would make him one of its highest paid players. The club drafted him for the 1994 season and he was considered to replace Paul Kelly as club captain. However Brereton's time in Sydney was marred by multiple tribunal appearances including 6 and 7 week bans. He infamously stomped on Hawthorn player Rayden Tallis's head while Tallis was on the ground in a pre-season game, earning him a seven-match suspension. He received another seven-week suspension in that same year when Richmond's Tony Free had his jaw broken with an alleged karate chop. While he starred in some upset wins he spent more time off the field than on it resulting in Barassi labeling the experiment a disappointment and not offering Brereton a contract extension. Brereton was delisted at the end of the 1994 season.

=== Collingwood (1995) ===
Still wanting to perform at the highest level, Brereton worked on his fitness over the 1994–95 off-season and once again made himself available for the national draft. While clubs are generally loath to recruit players above the age of 30, especially during Brereton's era, Collingwood nonetheless took a gamble on him. The Magpies' experiment was slightly more successful than his stint at Sydney, and in 15 games he kicked a total of 30 goals, ending his career at the end of 1995.

== Statistics ==
Legend
G	Goals	K	Kicks	D	Disposals	T	Tackles
B	Behinds	H	Handballs	M	Marks

Season	Team	No.	Games	Totals							Averages (per game)						
Season	Team	No.	Games	G	B	K	H	D	M	T	G	B	K	H	D	M	T
1982	Hawthorn	47	2	5	4	16	4	20	6	—N/a	2.5	2.0	8.0	2.0	10.0	3.0	—N/a
1983†	Hawthorn	23	17	22	19	133	95	228	92	—N/a	1.3	1.1	7.8	5.6	13.4	5.4	—N/a
1984	Hawthorn	23	25	50	34	263	99	362	130	—N/a	2.0	1.4	10.5	4.0	14.5	5.2	—N/a
1985	Hawthorn	23	25	58	37	273	109	382	136	—N/a	2.3	1.5	10.9	4.4	15.3	5.4	—N/a
1986†	Hawthorn	23	21	44	34	229	85	314	124	—N/a	2.1	1.6	10.9	4.0	15.0	5.9	—N/a
1987	Hawthorn	23	23	64	34	273	112	385	164	46	2.8	1.5	11.9	4.9	16.7	7.1	2.0
1988†	Hawthorn	23	17	47	26	189	55	244	123	21	2.8	1.5	11.1	3.2	14.4	7.2	1.2
1989†	Hawthorn	23	18	35	24	187	51	238	103	23	1.9	1.3	10.4	2.8	13.2	5.7	1.3
1990	Hawthorn	23	18	54	22	220	65	285	121	25	3.0	1.2	12.2	3.6	15.8	6.7	1.4
1991†	Hawthorn	23	17	39	28	171	64	235	98	25	2.3	1.6	10.1	3.8	13.8	5.8	1.5
1992	Hawthorn	23	6	9	6	35	14	49	18	8	1.5	1.0	5.8	2.3	8.2	3.0	1.3
1994	Sydney	2	7	7	5	30	20	50	21	9	1.0	0.7	4.3	2.9	7.1	3.0	1.3
1995	Collingwood	3	15	30	12	95	51	146	43	13	2.0	0.8	6.3	3.4	9.7	2.9	0.9
Career			211	464	285	2114	824	2938	1179	170	2.2	1.4	10.0	3.9	13.9	5.6	1.4

† Premiers

== Post-football ==
After a lack of success in his returns from retirement, Brereton announced his intention to retire from elite football in 1995. In 1996, he returned to Frankston Rovers (now Frankston Bombers), where he had his cheekbone broken by a Dromana player in the second round of the season. He played a handful of games before going into playing retirement proper at the conclusion of the season.

After his playing career, Brereton was inducted into the Hawthorn Team of the Century as well as the Australian Football Hall of Fame. He is also a member of the Mornington Peninsula Nepean Football League Hall of Fame.

His desire to continue playing football actively has seen him participate in the AFL Legends Match on several occasions. Each time, his lack of fitness is the focus of much mirth by the commentary team.

On 8 December 1997, he was appointed as a director of the Hawthorn Football Club and served in the role for just over eight years before retiring on 29 March 2006. One of the most notable incidents during his term as director was his alleged involvement in the run-up to a bench-clearing brawl between Hawthorn and Essendon in a 2004 encounter that became known as the Line in the Sand Match. During half-time, just before the brawl, Brereton had reportedly told Hawthorn players to "draw a line in the sand" and take a physical stand against Essendon; he denied making that particular remark, but he admitted to telling senior players "to stand up to any Essendon aggression".

After Brereton's success in Ireland, the AFL reappointed him for the 2001 series, but in July 2001 it was reported that Brereton had notified the AFL of his intention to relinquish the job for personal reasons.

In 2006, he began playing in the Yarra Valley Mountain District Football League with Division 1 club Woori Yallock alongside his 1995 Collingwood teammate Damian Monkhorst, kicking two goals on debut.

In 2025, Brereton's stepson Archie May was drafted by Essendon in the mid-season draft.

=== Commentary career ===
From quite early in his playing career, Brereton pursued media appearances in anticipation of joining the media full-time when he retired. During the 1980s, he had a six-year stint on a morning show hosted by veteran television performer Ernie Sigley, who mentored the ambitious Brereton. In the early 1990s, he joined Channel Nine when the network began showing interest in Australian football for the first time in more than twenty years. He was one of the original panellists when the long-running AFL Footy Show began in 1994, and he also wrote in The Age. In 2000, he moved to the Seven Network to provide match commentary on AFL matches and host the ill-fated show The Game; he stayed at Seven until they relinquished the rights at the end of 2001. In 2002, he returned to the Nine Network to provide match commentary on AFL matches when the network commenced its AFL coverage. He continued to be a regular panellist for The AFL Footy Show.

In 2004, Brereton hosted The Run Home radio show on Melbourne AM radio station SEN 1116 with Anthony Hudson and Matthew Hardy, but he left due to a payment dispute. In previous years, he has also co-hosted the breakfast show on Melbourne FM station Gold 104.3 with Greg Evans, and he had also been a commentator on another FM station, Triple M.

In 2005, he appeared in a Toyota Memorable Moments advertisement featuring Stephen Curry that satirised the famous 1989 Grand Final incident with Geelong player Mark Yeates. In November of that year, Brereton was involved in an altercation with a group of young men.

In 2006, he made an appearance on Torvill and Dean's Dancing on Ice. Brereton left the show early after injuring his biceps. In 2006, Brereton was sacked from Triple M due to low ratings. In 2007, Brereton rejoined 1116 SEN to broadcast football, the same station he left two years earlier.

In 2007, Brereton started as a presenter on Channel 9's Getaway, a tourism and travel TV show, which was a position he held until 2011.

In 2011, he ended his 20-year association with the Nine Network and announced he would be joining Foxtel for the 2012 season. From 2012 onwards, he has provided match commentary for Foxtel and hosted the Fox League Teams show on Thursday nights on Foxtel's 24-hour AFL channel, Fox Footy, which launched on 17 February 2012.

== Other work ==
=== Films ===
He featured in a minor role in the critically panned 2002 film Trojan Warrior.

=== Video games ===
Brereton has been a voice-over commentator for the AFL video game series since 2002.

=== TV ===
In 2004, Bereton made a guest appearance in a season eight episode of the crime drama television series Stingers, as the episode's main antagonist James Roberts. Brereton competed in the 5th season of the Australian version of I'm a Celebrity...Get Me Out of Here!. He was eliminated on 5 February 2019 and finished in tenth place.
