= Jason Dunstall =

Australian rules footballer (born 1964)

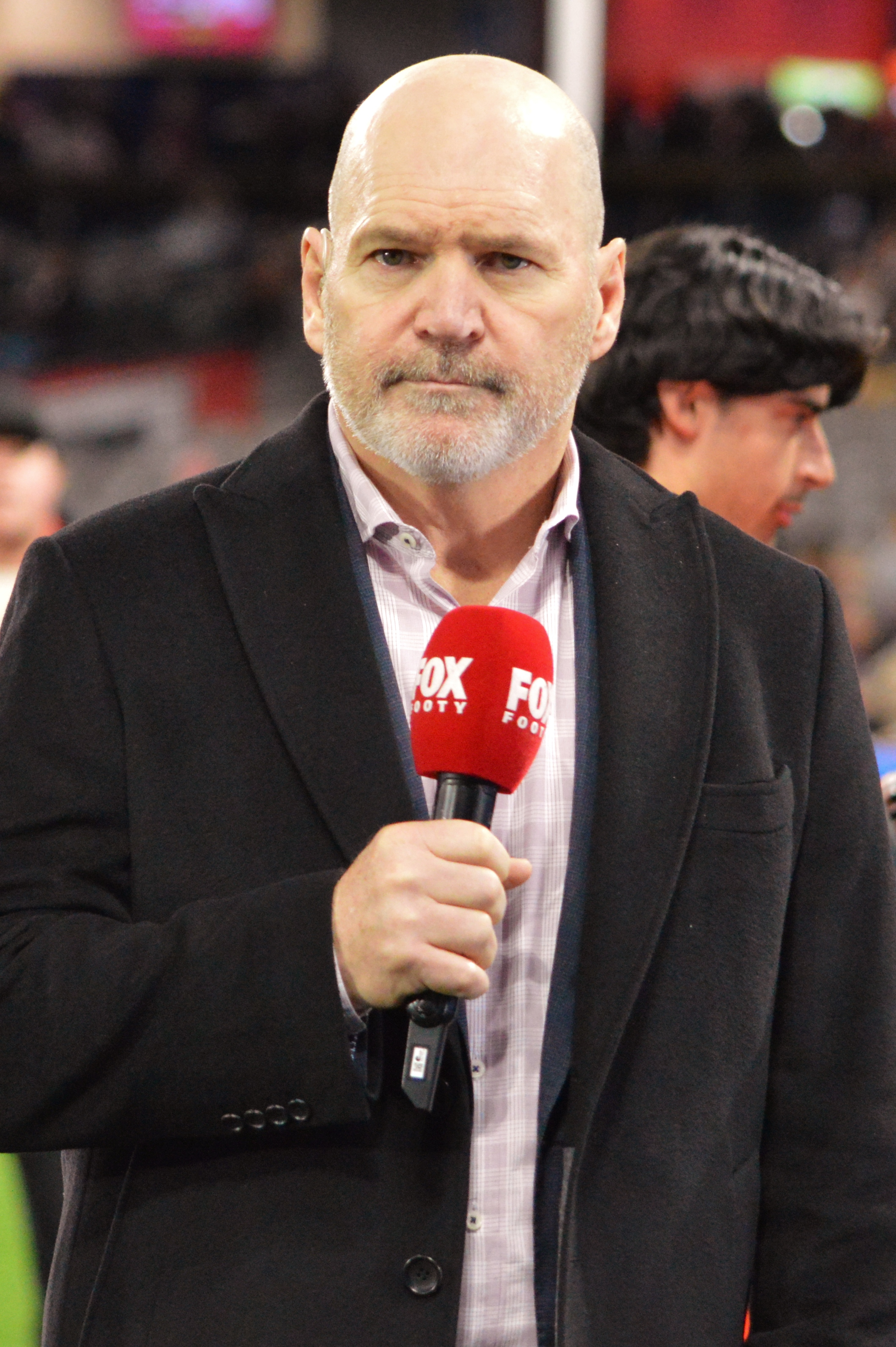
- Dunstall in August 2026

Personal information
- Full name: Jason Hadfield Dunstall
- Nicknames: Chief, Piggy, Bung, Silverback
- Born: 14 August 1964 (age 62); Brisbane, Queensland
- Original team: Coorparoo
- Height: 188 cm (6 ft 2 in)
- Weight: 98 kg (216 lb)
- Position: Full-forward

Playing career^{1}
Years	Club	Games (Goals)
1985–1998	Hawthorn	269 (1254)

Representative team honours
Years	Team	Games (Goals)
1988–1989	Victoria	3 (14)
1992–1993	Queensland	4 (10)
1996	Allies	1 (0)
- ^{1} Playing statistics correct to the end of 1998.

Career highlights
- 4× VFL/AFL premiership player: 1986, 1988, 1989, 1991; 5× VFL/AFL night series premiership: 1985, 1986, 1988, 1991, 1992; AFLPA MVP: 1992; 3× Coleman Medal: 1988, 1989, 1992; 4× All-Australian team: 1988, 1989, 1992, 1994; 2× VFL Team of the Year: 1988–1989; Hawthorn captain: 1995–1998; 4× Peter Crimmins Memorial Trophy: 1988, 1989, 1992, 1993; 12× Hawthorn leading goalkicker: 1986–1996, 1998; Simpson Medal: 1989; E. J. Whitten Medal: 1989; Australian Football Hall of Fame (2002) – Legend status (2024); Hawthorn Hall of Fame – Legend status; Hawthorn Team of the Century

Jason Hadfield Dunstall (born 14 August 1964) is a former Australian rules footballer who played for the Hawthorn Football Club in the Australian Football League (AFL).

Originally from Queensland, Dunstall was one of the first of a generation of big-bodied, lead-up full-forwards who could also out-wrestle opponents for position in a marking contest, while remaining an agile, team-orientated player. He was a full-forward during an era in which power forwards—including Tony Lockett, Gary Ablett Sr., Warwick Capper, Allen Jakovich, Simon Beasley, Saverio Rocca, John Longmire, Tony Modra and Peter Sumich—dominated the league goalkicking. He is one of only six players to have kicked over 1,000 career goals in the VFL/AFL, and only Lockett and Collingwood's Gordon Coventry have kicked more career goals. In an interview in 2011, champion North Melbourne footballer Wayne Carey regarded Dunstall as the best player he had seen and played against. In 2024, he was promoted to be one of just 32 Legends in the Australian Football Hall of Fame.

After finishing as a player, Dunstall became a prominent football media personality, commentating matches for various radio stations in Melbourne and appearing regularly on Fox Footy as the host of the show Bounce.

== Early life ==
Dunstall was born and raised in Brisbane as one of three sons; his brothers are Harry and Nicholas. He attended the Anglican Church Grammar School from 1977 to 1981. At school, he played soccer as a goalkeeper, as well as rugby union. His junior Australian rules football was spent playing with the Coorparoo Football Club in the then-Queensland Australian Football League (QAFL). He grew up supporting the Carlton Football Club due to Coorparoo wearing the same jumper and aspired to one day play for the VFL club.

In 1984, as a 20-year-old, Dunstall made his senior debut and enjoyed a stellar season, claiming the QAFL leading goalkicker award with 73 goals in the home-and-away season and kicking seven goals in Coorparoo's Grand Final win.

Attracting interest from the VFL, Dunstall approached Carlton; however, the club appeared to not be interested. He instead received an offer to train with Fitzroy, but reserves coach Brian Walsh was not impressed, choosing to recruit fellow Queenslander Scott McIvor instead. Dunstall was recruited to VFL club Hawthorn in 1985, touted as a new tall forward option, a recruitment which was largely overshadowed by the hype of West Australian recruit Steve Malaxos.

Although coach Allan Jeans was not immediately impressed by Dunstall's physical appearance, he became somewhat of a father figure over the course of the 1980s. When a group of players was arrested after a night out during an overseas trip, Jeans was called to the local police station to address their detention. Jeans' advice to the officer has become a highlight of premiership reunion events; he reputedly advised the officer in charge he was free to shoot "him, him and him, but don't shoot the fat one" as he looked at his star full-forward.

== League playing career ==
Dunstall made his 1985 VFL debut against Melbourne at Princes Park. He had an immediate impact, kicking an impressive three goals and three behinds in his team's demolition of the Demons; however, he was third in the team's goalkicking, behind Dermott Brereton and John Kennedy. He was dropped from the side three games later after a loss to Richmond; however, he regained some form towards the end of the season, finishing with 35 goals. In his breakout game against Richmond, he kicked eight goals, and the media heralded the twenty-year-old Queenslander as a future star.

In 1987, expansion club the Brisbane Bears—in search of a marquee Queenslander—made a 10-year offer of A$2 million (equivalent to $5,480,000 in 2022) to Dunstall. Despite the lucrative deal and the opportunity to return to his home state, he turned it down, choosing to stay with the Hawks.

1988 was a special year for Dunstall. In Round 19, against Fitzroy, he brought up his first century of goals in a season. He had kicked 98 goals going into the match, and Hawthorn supporters expected the required two goals to come sooner rather than later. However, Dunstall missed his first two shots and dropped a few marks before putting through his first goal at the 17-minute mark. The moment of truth came at the 30-minute mark of the first quarter when teammate Dermott Brereton kicked the ball high into the air. It took a vicious bounce over Fitzroy defender Brett Stephens' head and landed in Dunstall's arms. The goal was kicked and the fans came running onto the ground to congratulate only the second Hawthorn player, after Peter Hudson, to kick 100 goals in a season.

Dunstall kicked a further six goals for the game to finish with 8 goals. He would finish the home-and-away season with 124 goals, winning his first Coleman Medal. Dunstall became the first Queenslander to win the Coleman Medal in 1988 and also won his first club best and fairest award. In the 1988 Grand Final massacre against Melbourne, he kicked 7 goals.

Dunstall established his reputation as one of the best full-forwards in Australia during the 1989 VFL season. He won his second straight Coleman Medal, tallying 128 goals during the home-and-away season, and finished third in the Brownlow Medal vote count. He kicked ten or more goals in a match twice: in Round 16, he kicked 11 goals against Collingwood, and in Round 22, he kicked 11 goals against St Kilda. Dunstall added ten more goals during the finals series, four of those in the epic 1989 premiership victory, to take his overall tally to 138 goals for the season. He also won the club best and fairest award for the second straight year. Representing Victoria in the State of Origin series, Dunstall won the Simpson Medal for best on ground in the match against Western Australia played in Perth.

=== 1990s ===
1990 began promisingly enough for Dunstall. In Round 1, in the Grand Final rematch against Geelong at Waverley Park, he kicked a then career-best 12 goals after being held goalless in the first quarter. Hawthorn went on to thrash the Cats by 115 points. In Round 4 against Brisbane Bears at Princes Park in wet conditions, Dunstall kicked 8 goals, bringing up his 500th career goal in the process, as the Hawks won by 82 points. But in Round 9 against Melbourne, Dunstall was injured in the first quarter. He fell heavily on an opponent's boot and sustained a serious injury at the front of his head. He was taken from the ground and admitted to The Alfred Hospital. At that stage of the season, Dunstall had kicked 41 goals. The injury would cause him to miss the next four matches. After his return in Round 14, he kicked a further 42 goals, including 11 goals against Collingwood in Round 20. On a television program after the 1990 AFL Grand Final, Leigh Matthews said that he was glad Hawthorn got knocked out of the finals, because Dunstall always seemed to kick a huge number of goals against the recently crowned premiers.

Dunstall kicked 82 goals in 1991, including six in the Grand Final as Hawthorn claimed their 9th Premiership. They were unable to defend the premiership in 1992 after they lost to West Coast in a closely contested Elimination Final. But Dunstall enjoyed arguably his most successful season on an individual level. He won his third Coleman Medal after kicking 139 goals during the home-and-away season (six more in the Elimination Final took his season tally to 145), and finished second in the Brownlow Medal vote count. In Round 7, Dunstall kicked a career-best 17 goals against Richmond, just one goal short of the VFL/AFL record held by Fred Fanning of Melbourne. Dunstall reached his century of goals against Geelong in Round 16 at Kardinia Park with his fifth goal of the match just before half-time. He ended the match with 9 goals and beat three opponents as Hawthorn won by 19 points. Dunstall's outstanding season was recognised with his third club best and fairest award, as well as his first selection in the All-Australian team at full-forward.

In the Elimination Final in 1996 against Sydney, Dunstall tumbled over Andrew Dunkley and was left writhing on the ground clutching a badly injured knee, which required a knee reconstruction. Surprisingly, it healed well enough for him to play half a reserves match just before the start of the 1997 AFL season, and was picked to play against St Kilda in the opening round.

Dunstall recovered in time for the start of the 1998 AFL season. He had kicked 52 goals for the season before tragedy again struck in Round 14 against Carlton, the same team against which Dunstall had injured his knee the previous season. Lining up on illustrious opponent Stephen Silvagni, Dunstall twisted and fell on his right shoulder early in the second quarter. Silvagni accidentally landed on top of Dunstall at the same time, forcing Dunstall's shoulder into the ground and breaking his collarbone.

Dunstall's shoulder was put in a special brace for several weeks, and club physiotherapist Barry Gavin was optimistic of his chances of returning before the end of the season, a view not shared by doctors at several other clubs. Dunstall did return for the final game of the year, but only after having announced his retirement, first to the Hawthorn coaching and management staff, then to the general public on the Seven Network football show Live and Kicking.

Before Dunstall's final game, against Fremantle at Waverley Park, a number of his former teammates and associates came to congratulate him, including coach Allan Jeans. Dunstall was clearly moved by the occasion; however, a severe lack of match fitness meant he struggled to have much impact on the game. He did, however, score the first goal of the game and the first goal of the last term. Nevertheless, the 40,000 or so Hawthorn fans that came to pay tribute to their champion cheered every touch that Dunstall got of the ball. The Hawks kicked 11 goals in the last quarter to win by 89 points, and amid emotional scenes, Dunstall was chaired off the ground by his teammates, bringing to a close one of the most successful eras in Hawthorn's on-field history.

=== Other matches ===
Dunstall also scored 120 goals in 30 pre-season/night series matches – 116 for Hawthorn in 29 games and four for Queensland in one game – as well as 24 goals in eight State of Origin matches – 14 goals in three matches for Victoria and ten goals in four matches for Queensland, being kept goalless in his one match for the Allies. If these are considered, Dunstall played a total of 307 senior career games and kicked 1398 senior career goals in elite Australian rules football (the VFL/AFL, SANFL and the WAFL). The VFL/AFL lists Dunstall's total as 277 senior career games and 1278 senior career goals, excluding his pre-season/night series matches.

Dunstall also played 14 games and kicked 73 goals for Coorparoo in the QAFL in 1984. If the QAFL is considered here, then Dunstall played a total of 321 senior career games and kicked 1471 senior career goals.

Dunstall also played eight matches and kicked 36 goals in the VFL reserves in 1985 for Hawthorn. If these are also considered, then Dunstall played a total of 329 overall career games and kicked 1507 overall career goals, including 307 career games and 1410 career goals across the VFL/AFL in seniors, reserves and pre-season/night series matches.

== Statistics ==
Legend
G	Goals	K	Kicks	D	Disposals	T	Tackles
B	Behinds	H	Handballs	M	Marks
#	Played in that season's premiership team	†	Led the league for the season

Season	Team	No.	Games	Totals							Averages (per game)							Votes
Season	Team	No.	Games	G	B	K	H	D	M	T	G	B	K	H	D	M	T	Votes
1985	Hawthorn	19	16	36	27	123	42	165	62	—N/a	2.3	1.7	7.7	2.6	10.3	3.9	—N/a	2
1986^{#}	Hawthorn	19	22	77	31	163	55	218	123	—N/a	3.5	1.4	7.4	2.5	9.9	5.6	—N/a	5
1987	Hawthorn	19	24	94	58^{†}	231	42	273	143	13	3.9	2.4	9.6	1.8	11.4	6.0	0.5	9
1988^{#}	Hawthorn	19	23	132^{†}	66^{†}	270	47	317	185^{†}	20	5.7^{†}	2.9	11.7	2.0	13.8	8.0^{†}	0.9	16
1989^{#}	Hawthorn	19	24	138^{†}	76^{†}	306	54	360	207^{†}	21	5.8	3.2^{†}	12.8	2.3	15.0	8.6	0.9	16
1990	Hawthorn	19	18	83	39	157	36	193	113	10	4.6	2.2	8.7	2.0	10.7	6.3	0.6	9
1991^{#}	Hawthorn	19	18	82	47	177	41	218	105	18	4.6	2.6	9.8	2.3	12.1	5.8	1.0	4
1992	Hawthorn	19	23	145^{†}	84^{†}	284	59	343	199^{†}	19	6.3^{†}	3.7^{†}	12.3	2.6	14.9	8.7	0.8	18
1993	Hawthorn	19	21	123	55	235	42	277	166	16	5.9	2.6	11.2	2.0	13.2	7.9	0.8	16
1994	Hawthorn	19	19	101	47	194	58	252	144	23	5.3	2.5	10.2	3.1	13.3	7.6	1.2	12
1995	Hawthorn	19	17	66	38	142	32	174	102	10	3.9	2.2	8.4	1.9	10.2	6.0	0.6	2
1996	Hawthorn	19	23	102	45	187	62	249	132	12	4.4	2.0	8.1	2.7	10.8	5.7	0.5	11
1997	Hawthorn	19	8	21	10	43	16	59	33	6	2.6	1.3	5.4	2.0	7.4	4.1	0.8	0
1998	Hawthorn	19	13	54	18	88	21	109	65	6	4.2	1.4	6.8	1.6	8.4	5.0	0.5	9
Career			269	1254	641	2600	607	3207	1779	174	4.7	2.4	9.7	2.3	11.9	6.6	0.6	129

== Honours and achievements ==
Team

- 4× VFL/AFL premiership player (Hawthorn): 1986, 1988, 1989, 1991
- 3× Minor premiership (Hawthorn): 1986, 1988, 1989
- 5× VFL/AFL night series premiership: 1985, 1986, 1988, 1991, 1992

Individual

- AFLPA MVP: 1992
- 3× Coleman Medal: 1988, 1989, 1992
- 2× All-Australian team: 1992, 1994
- 4× Peter Crimmins Memorial Trophy: 1988, 1989, 1992, 1993
- 12× Hawthorn leading goalkicker: 1986, 1987, 1988, 1989, 1990, 1991, 1992, 1993, 1994, 1995, 1996, 1998
- Queensland State of Origin captain 1993
- Hawthorn captain: 1995–1998
- Simpson Medal: 1989
- E. J. Whitten Medal: 1989
- Australian Football Hall of Fame: 2002; elevated to Legend status in 2024
- Hawthorn Hall of Fame – Legend status
- Hawthorn Team of the Century

== Post-football ==
Dunstall has been a guest commentator on the Seven Network and radio station 3AW, and was a regular panellist in the early days of The Footy Show.

In 2002, Dunstall was inducted into the Australian Football Hall of Fame.

In 2004, Dunstall held the position of interim CEO at Hawthorn. After handing over the CEO position, Dunstall remained on the Hawthorn board until his term expired at the end of 2013. He later worked on radio station Triple M as a commentator. His stint as CEO led to the nickname of "The Chief", coined by Sam Newman. Newman also dubbed him "Silverback" due to his alleged similar appearance to a gorilla—a moniker apparently intended as a compliment. His mannerisms on Fox Footy and Triple M lean towards professionalism, which at times can be seen as too serious (as seen on the 1980s Heritage Round episode of The AFL Footy Show on 20 July 2006, where he refused to dress up to mark the occasion). He has been the focus of continual baiting by his Triple M co-commentators and is nicknamed "The Ugandan National Symbol" for his gorilla-like style, attitude and demeanour. These gorilla references made their way onto The Footy Show, where both fans and Sam Newman repeatedly baited Dunstall with video clips and props.

In early September 2008, the hosts of The Footy Show launched "The Great Chief Chase" in which viewers were offered five double passes to The Footy Show Grand Final concert for the best photo a person could take with Dunstall. Dunstall was reportedly furious when details of his whereabouts were made public, resulting in people knocking on his house door asking for photos with him. He was especially threatening towards James Brayshaw, a colleague at Triple M and one of the hosts on The Footy Show who had labelled Dunstall a "sook". Dunstall and Brayshaw formally ended their feud the following week at the Victoria Racing Club footy finals fever lunch.

Dunstall has also hosted various television shows, including the Seven Network's Live and Kicking and Fox Footy's Saturday Central (with Wayne Carey), On the Couch and League Teams. He was a host of Triple M radio show The Gospel with Nathan Brown, Peter Everitt and Nick Riewoldt until 2006.

He was a member of The Friday Rub on Friday nights alongside James Brayshaw, Garry Lyon and Damian Barrett on Triple M. Dunstall is also the host of Bounce, a weekly football show broadcast on Fox Footy.

Reflecting his Queensland upbringing, Dunstall is depicted lining up for goal wearing a Queensland state guernsey in Jamie Cooper's painting The Game That Made Australia, commissioned by the AFL in 2008 to celebrate the 150th anniversary of the sport.

A stand at the Coorparoo Oval and the schoolboys competition in Brisbane (Jason Dunstall Cup) are both named after him.

In July 2014, Dunstall was elevated to Legend status in the Hawthorn Hall of Fame.

On 9 April 2015, the Melbourne Renegades announced that they had appointed Dunstall as the club's new Chairman, replacing outgoing Chairman and fellow Triple M Footy colleague James Brayshaw.

In 2024, Dunstall was made one of 32 players in the history of Australian rules football to be elevated to Legend status in the Australian Football Hall of Fame.

In 2025, he was inducted into Sport Australia Hall of Fame as an athlete member.

== Personal life ==
As of 2003, he was married to wife Deb Dunstall.

== Bibliography ==
- The Goal King: Jason Dunstall's own story (With Ken Piesse) Melbourne : Wilkinson Books, 1995. ISBN 1-86350-208-4
