= Andrew Bews =

Australian rules footballer

Personal information
- Full name: Andrew Bews
- Nickname: The Rat
- Born: 19 July 1964 (age 62); Geelong, Victoria
- Original team: North Geelong (GFL)
- Height: 175 cm (5 ft 9 in)
- Weight: 79 kg (174 lb)
- Position: Rover / Back pocket

Playing career^{1}
| Years | Club | Games (Goals) |
| 1982–1993 | Geelong | 207 (132) |
| 1994–1996 | Brisbane Bears | 56 (2) |
| 1997–1998 | Brisbane Lions | 19 (0) |
| Total | | 282 (134) |

Representative team honours
| Years | Team | Games (Goals) |
| | Victoria | 12 |
- ^{1} Playing statistics correct to the end of 1998.

Career highlights
- All-Australian team: 1987; Geelong captain: 1990–1991

Andrew Bews (born 19 July 1964) is a former Australian rules footballer who played 282 VFL/AFL games during the 1980s and 1990s.

Debuting in 1981 after being recruited from North Geelong, Bews played over 200 games for Geelong. Representing Victoria, he won the Simpson Medal in 1987 for best on ground against Western Australia in Perth. He went on to earn All-Australian selection the same year.

Bews moved to Brisbane in 1994 to play for the Brisbane Bears where he was used in defence. Bews' height was 175 cm and his weight 83 kg.

In addition to his football career Bews was a talented junior athlete, along with his brothers Stephen and Grant, all competing for the Geelong Guild Athletic Club. Bews' earliest victories came at the 1978 "Weekly Times" Victorian Country Track and Field Championships held at Landy Field, South Geelong where he gained three gold medals in the men's under 14 90 metre hurdles, long and triple jump events.

Bews continues his links with the Geelong Guild Athletic Club, after retiring from football, he returned to track and field athletics as a veteran.

Bews most recently was the MC for the Geelong Guild Athletic Club's Centenary Dinner, held in Capri Receptions at North Geelong on 12 July 2008.

His son Jed is a current player at the Geelong Football Club, drafted with the 86th pick in the 2011 AFL draft under the father–son rule.
