= Peter Carey (umpire) =

Australian rules football umpire

Peter Carey is a former Australian rules football umpire in the Australian Football League.

== Career ==
Throughout his career at VFL/AFL level, Carey umpired 307 senior games. He was named the All-Australian umpire in 1992 and umpired four VFL/AFL grand finals, as well as a VFA grand final.

Carey achieved lasting notoriety after taking a mark while umpiring a match. In his 299th AFL match, between Fremantle and St Kilda at Subiaco Oval in 1999, Fremantle's Adrian Fletcher kicked the ball from the wing towards the centre of the oval directly at Carey. Rather than move out of the way, Carey proceeded to take the mark on his chest as if he were the intended recipient of the kick. He immediately stopped the game and called for a ball-up to the general consternation and laughter of the players around him. The AFL summoned Carey for a "please explain" after the incident, but no action was taken against him. The incident is generally considered to be one of the more humorous in the league's history and was celebrated as one of the "150 Greatest Moments" in 2008's celebration of 150 years of Australian rules football.

Legendary AFL commentator Dennis Cometti remarked soon after Carey's "mark": "Carey by name, Carey by nature", undoubtedly a reference to Wayne Carey.

Carey served for a time on the AFL Tribunal's Match Review panel. In August 2010, it was announced that Carey would take up the new position of National Basketball League Referees Manager.

In February 2020, Carey was appointed Head of Umpiring for the Eastern Football Netball League (EFNL) in Melbourne's outer eastern suburbs.
