= Mark Yeates (Australian footballer) =

Australian rules footballer

Personal information
- Born: 10 May 1960 (age 66)
- Original team: West Gambier (WBFL)
- Height: 185 cm (6 ft 1 in)
- Weight: 84 kg (185 lb)

Playing career^{1}
Years	Club	Games (Goals)
1980–1990	Geelong	154 (57)
- ^{1} Playing statistics correct to the end of 1990.

Mark Yeates (born 10 May 1960) is a former Australian rules footballer who played with Geelong in the Victorian Football League (VFL) during the 1980s.

Playing his junior football with Mount Gambier High School and West Gambier Football Club in the Western Border Football League (WBFL), Yeates was recruited by Geelong and made his VFL debut in 1980, winning the club's "Most Determined Player" in 1981 and "Best Team Player" in 1983.

Yeates is best known for an incident in the 1989 VFL Grand Final when he felled Dermott Brereton after the opening bounce which saw the Hawthorn forward suffer a bruised kidney and internal bleeding.

He left Geelong at the end of the 1990 AFL season and for the next two years was captain/coach of North Hobart, leading them to back-to-back Tasmanian Football League (TFL) premierships in 1991 and 1992 before announcing his retirement.

Yeates was playing coach of Princetown in the Heytesbury Mt Noorat Football League for the 1996 season, but played minimal games due to injury.

In 2000 Yeates coached Geelong's first all female side at the East Geelong Football Club. The club's women's team was entered into the Victorian Women's Football League division two competition where they were only one game out of the finals on their debut season.

His father John Yeates was captain of Geelong in 1961 and 1962 and played in Geelong's 1963 premiership side. His cousins Neville and Darryl Growden were also very skilful footballers, the latter playing for Port Adelaide throughout the 1980s.
