= Michael Schulze (Australian footballer) =

Australian rules footballer

Personal information
- Full name: Michael Schulze
- Born: 30 October 1964 (age 62)
- Original team: Grovedale
- Height: 193 cm (6 ft 4 in)
- Weight: 88 kg (194 lb)
- Position: Key position defender

Playing career^{1}
Years	Club	Games (Goals)
1985–1991	Geelong	91 (12)
- ^{1} Playing statistics correct to the end of 1991.

Michael Schulze (born 30 October 1962) is a former Australian rules footballer who played with Geelong in the VFL/AFL during the late 1980s and early 1990s.

Schulze, originally from Grovedale, played mostly as a centre halfback and was in that position when Geelong lost the 1989 VFL Grand Final. He made a total of 91 senior appearances for Geelong.
