= Shane Hamilton =

Australian rules footballer

Personal information
- Full name: Shane Hamilton
- Born: 18 August 1970 (age 56)
- Original team: St Arnaud
- Height: 183 cm (6 ft 0 in)
- Weight: 80 kg (176 lb)

Playing career^{1}
Years	Club	Games (Goals)
1988–1990	Geelong	27 (40)
1991–1995	Brisbane Bears	47 (30)
Total		74 (70)
- ^{1} Playing statistics correct to the end of 1995.

Shane Hamilton (born 18 August 1970) is a former Australian rules footballer who played with Geelong and the Brisbane Bears in the VFL/AFL.

== Career ==
Hamilton was only 17 when he made his league debut for Geelong. In his third game, he was able to kick 7 goals against Sydney at the SCG. He played six games in 1989 but four of them were finals, including the famed 1989 VFL Grand Final against Hawthorn where he kicked a couple of goals in a losing cause.

He finished his career in Brisbane after five seasons at the Bears. It was observed that he got more regular game time here than he did when he was with the stronger Geelong.

Hamilton coached the Huntly Football Club in the Heathcote District Football League during the 2008 and 2009 seasons.
