= Darrin Pritchard =

Australian rules footballer

Personal information
- Full name: Darrin James Pritchard
- Born: 21 March 1966 (age 60); Hobart, Tasmania
- Original team: Sandy Bay
- Draft: No. 26, 1986 national draft
- Height: 178 cm (5 ft 10 in)
- Weight: 74 kg (163 lb)

Playing career^{1}
Years	Club	Games (Goals)
1987–1997	Hawthorn	211 (94)
- ^{1} Playing statistics correct to the end of 1997.

Career highlights
- Premiership player 1988, 1989, 1991; 1× VFL Team of Year: 1989; Australian Football Hall of Fame; State of Origin; 3 times Tasmania Captain

Darrin James Pritchard (born 21 March 1966) is a former Australian rules footballer who played for Hawthorn in the Australian Football League.

Pritchard played in three VFL/AFL Premierships with Hawthorn in 1988, 1989 and 1991. Recruited from Sandy Bay in Tasmania, he represented both his home and adopted states at state of origin level, skippering the former on three occasions and he was named in the 1989 VFL Team of the Year. After sustaining a broken leg in 1995 he made a creditable comeback but was never quite the same player. He retired after the 1997 season having played 211 VFL/AFL games.
