= 1989 VFL season =

93rd season of the Victorian Football League (VFL)

1989 VFL premiership season
- Teams: 14
- Premiers: Hawthorn; 8th premiership
- Minor premiers: Hawthorn; 7th minor premiership
- pre-season cup: Melbourne; 1st pre-season cup win
- Brownlow Medallist: Paul Couch (Geelong)
- Coleman Medallist: Jason Dunstall (Hawthorn)

Attendance
- Matches played: 160
- Total attendance: 3,581,822 (22,386 per match)
- Highest: 94,796 (Grand Final, Hawthorn vs. Geelong)

The 1989 VFL season was the 93rd season of the Victorian Football League (VFL), the highest level senior Australian rules football competition and administrative body in Victoria and, by reason of it featuring clubs from New South Wales, Queensland and Western Australia, the de facto highest level senior competition in Australia. It was the last season under the Victorian Football League name, before being renamed the Australian Football League in 1990. The season featured fourteen clubs, ran from 31 March until 30 September, and comprised a 22-game home-and-away season followed by a finals series featuring the top five clubs.

The premiership was won by the Hawthorn Football Club for the eighth time and second time consecutively, after it defeated Geelong by six points in the 1989 VFL Grand Final.

== Night series ==
1989 Night Series Grand Final
Geelong	def. by	Melbourne
3.2 (20); 6.6 (42); 9.7 (61); 9.13 (67)	Q1; Q2; Q3; Final	2.5 (17); 4.7 (31); 5.11 (41); 10.16 (76)

== Home-and-away season ==
=== Round 1 ===
Home team	Home score	Away team	Away score	Venue	Crowd	Date
West Coast	14.12 (96)	Essendon	17.10 (112)	WACA Ground	25,664	31 March 1989
Carlton	10.13 (73)	Footscray	19.18 (132)	Princes Park	22,000	1 April 1989
Melbourne	18.8 (116)	Fitzroy	16.15 (111)	MCG	25,792	1 April 1989
St Kilda	20.16 (136)	Brisbane Bears	15.7 (97)	Moorabbin Oval	17,236	1 April 1989
Collingwood	13.15 (93)	Hawthorn	11.17 (83)	VFL Park	50,287	1 April 1989
Sydney	12.17 (89)	Richmond	11.7 (73)	SCG	8,611	2 April 1989
North Melbourne	18.17 (125)	Geelong	17.21 (123)	MCG	24,383	2 April 1989

=== Round 2 ===
Home team	Home team score	Away team	Away team score	Venue	Crowd	Date
Essendon	14.10 (94)	Melbourne	9.14 (68)	Windy Hill	20,123	8 April 1989
Richmond	24.12 (156)	Footscray	13.10 (88)	MCG	22,835	8 April 1989
Fitzroy	20.12 (132)	Collingwood	16.11 (107)	Princes Park	23,837	8 April 1989
St Kilda	13.18 (96)	Carlton	13.14 (92)	Moorabbin Oval	27,796	8 April 1989
North Melbourne	11.6 (72)	Hawthorn	21.15 (141)	VFL Park	18,939	8 April 1989
Geelong	26.19 (175)	West Coast	11.14 (80)	Kardinia Park	19,926	9 April 1989
Brisbane Bears	18.15 (123)	Sydney	8.17 (65)	Carrara Stadium	11,405	9 April 1989

=== Round 3 ===
Home team	Home team score	Away team	Away team score	Venue	Crowd	Date
Footscray	8.18 (66)	North Melbourne	12.12 (84)	Western Oval	14,926	15 April 1989
Richmond	8.13 (61)	Melbourne	18.14 (122)	MCG	32,580	15 April 1989
Hawthorn	20.15 (135)	Essendon	13.13 (91)	Princes Park	23,618	15 April 1989
Collingwood	19.21 (135)	Brisbane Bears	11.9 (75)	Victoria Park	18,240	15 April 1989
St Kilda	19.8 (122)	Fitzroy	19.18 (132)	VFL Park	31,780	15 April 1989
Sydney	20.14 (134)	West Coast	11.17 (83)	SCG	11,298	16 April 1989
Geelong	16.21 (117)	Carlton	9.10 (64)	Kardinia Park	27,475	16 April 1989

=== Round 4 ===
Home team	Home team score	Away team	Away team score	Venue	Crowd	Date
Melbourne	11.13 (79)	Brisbane Bears	7.11 (53)	MCG	17,560	21 April 1989
Fitzroy	11.13 (79)	Sydney	23.15 (153)	Princes Park	13,027	22 April 1989
Collingwood	23.21 (159)	St Kilda	14.11 (95)	Victoria Park	27,304	22 April 1989
Footscray	12.15 (87)	Geelong	14.15 (99)	Western Oval	22,844	23 April 1989
West Coast	10.12 (72)	North Melbourne	18.7 (115)	WACA Ground	18,546	23 April 1989
Carlton	15.20 (110)	Essendon	21.12 (138)	Princes Park	31,492	25 April 1989
Richmond	9.12 (66)	Hawthorn	15.20 (110)	VFL Park	41,347	25 April 1989

=== Round 5 ===
Home team	Home team score	Away team	Away team score	Venue	Crowd	Date
Fitzroy	16.17 (113)	Geelong	16.16 (112)	Princes Park	13,377	29 April 1989
Essendon	20.18 (138)	St Kilda	12.12 (84)	Windy Hill	18,694	29 April 1989
Melbourne	11.16 (82)	Footscray	10.11 (71)	MCG	25,273	29 April 1989
Hawthorn	18.17 (125)	Carlton	10.11 (71)	VFL Park	31,827	29 April 1989
North Melbourne	20.14 (134)	Richmond	26.15 (171)	MCG	19,691	30 April 1989
Brisbane Bears	10.13 (73)	West Coast	19.11 (125)	Carrara Stadium	9,694	30 April 1989
Sydney	10.17 (77)	Collingwood	9.12 (66)	SCG	22,490	30 April 1989

=== Round 6 ===
Home team	Home team score	Away team	Away team score	Venue	Crowd	Date
West Coast	12.9 (81)	Fitzroy	12.17 (89)	WACA Ground	21,268	5 May 1989
St Kilda	13.17 (95)	Sydney	9.13 (67)	Moorabbin Oval	20,285	6 May 1989
Hawthorn	26.15 (171)	Geelong	25.13 (163)	Princes Park	17,645	6 May 1989
Melbourne	9.10 (64)	Collingwood	18.16 (124)	MCG	67,239	6 May 1989
Carlton	15.12 (102)	Richmond	9.12 (66)	VFL Park	31,287	6 May 1989
Brisbane Bears	8.11 (59)	Footscray	6.15 (51)	Carrara Stadium	5,134	7 May 1989
North Melbourne	17.19 (121)	Essendon	16.9 (105)	MCG	34,379	7 May 1989

=== Round 7 ===
Home team	Home team score	Away team	Away team score	Venue	Crowd	Date
Sydney	7.16 (58)	North Melbourne	9.13 (67)	SCG	13,875	12 May 1989
Geelong	35.18 (228)	St Kilda	16.13 (109)	Kardinia Park	21,294	13 May 1989
Collingwood	16.10 (106)	Footscray	11.12 (78)	Victoria Park	23,523	13 May 1989
Hawthorn	25.15 (165)	Fitzroy	13.6 (84)	Princes Park	16,644	13 May 1989
Melbourne	12.14 (86)	Carlton	11.14 (80)	MCG	35,199	13 May 1989
Richmond	13.14 (92)	West Coast	13.12 (90)	VFL Park	11,745	13 May 1989
Brisbane Bears	12.9 (81)	Essendon	17.10 (112)	Carrara Stadium	12,034	14 May 1989

=== Round 8 ===
Home team	Home team score	Away team	Away team score	Venue	Crowd	Date
Hawthorn	22.25 (157)	Sydney	12.11 (83)	Princes Park	14,388	20 May 1989
Essendon	21.19 (145)	Richmond	12.15 (87)	Windy Hill	18,047	20 May 1989
St Kilda	18.7 (115)	North Melbourne	17.10 (112)	Moorabbin Oval	19,193	20 May 1989
Footscray	8.16 (64)	Fitzroy	9.9 (63)	Western Oval	11,926	20 May 1989
Geelong	26.23 (179)	Brisbane Bears	6.14 (50)	Kardinia Park	17,236	20 May 1989
Carlton	12.8 (80)	Collingwood	16.13 (109)	VFL Park	61,237	20 May 1989
West Coast	12.21 (93)	Melbourne	13.17 (95)	Subiaco Oval	16,017	21 May 1989

=== Round 9 ===
Home team	Home team score	Away team	Away team score	Venue	Crowd	Date
North Melbourne	25.15 (165)	Brisbane Bears	10.11 (71)	MCG	8,634	26 May 1989
St Kilda	18.10 (118)	West Coast	12.11 (83)	Moorabbin Oval	15,768	27 May 1989
Carlton	24.15 (159)	Fitzroy	18.14 (122)	Princes Park	19,520	27 May 1989
Richmond	10.17 (77)	Geelong	32.19 (211)	MCG	24,321	27 May 1989
Essendon	19.11 (125)	Collingwood	7.16 (58)	VFL Park	71,390	27 May 1989
Footscray	10.13 (73)	Hawthorn	17.15 (117)	Western Oval	16,437	28 May 1989
Sydney	6.7 (43)	Melbourne	6.16 (52)	SCG	13,475	28 May 1989

=== Round 10 ===
Home team	Home team score	Away team	Away team score	Venue	Crowd	Date
North Melbourne	12.11 (83)	Melbourne	16.17 (113)	MCG	27,159	2 June 1989
Footscray	14.14 (98)	Sydney	10.6 (66)	Western Oval	10,170	3 June 1989
Essendon	18.14 (122)	Fitzroy	10.9 (69)	Windy Hill	15,684	3 June 1989
Carlton	17.13 (115)	Brisbane Bears	18.10 (118)	Princes Park	12,247	3 June 1989
St Kilda	13.21 (99)	Richmond	13.14 (92)	VFL Park	24,839	3 June 1989
Geelong	23.16 (154)	Collingwood	13.10 (88)	MCG	65,187	3 June 1989
West Coast	15.15 (105)	Hawthorn	16.14 (110)	Subiaco Oval	20,213	4 June 1989

=== Round 11 ===
Home team	Home team score	Away team	Away team score	Venue	Crowd	Date
Sydney	8.9 (57)	Carlton	12.13 (85)	SCG	13,703	9 June 1989
Fitzroy	1.8 (14)	North Melbourne	6.13 (49)	Princes Park	7,921	10 June 1989
Richmond	5.15 (45)	Brisbane Bears	3.8 (26)	MCG	7,966	10 June 1989
Footscray	9.8 (62)	St Kilda	7.12 (54)	VFL Park	17,060	10 June 1989
West Coast	11.15 (81)	Collingwood	17.14 (116)	Subiaco Oval	20,233	11 June 1989
Hawthorn	8.6 (54)	Melbourne	10.9 (69)	Princes Park	21,716	12 June 1989
Geelong	12.17 (89)	Essendon	4.11 (35)	MCG	87,653	12 June 1989

=== Round 12 ===
Home team	Home team score	Away team	Away team score	Venue	Crowd	Date
West Coast	16.9 (105)	Footscray	11.11 (77)	WACA Ground	13,783	16 June 1989
Essendon	7.8 (50)	Sydney	7.13 (55)	Windy Hill	13,398	17 June 1989
Carlton	7.9 (51)	North Melbourne	5.10 (40)	Princes Park	16,111	17 June 1989
St Kilda	8.6 (54)	Hawthorn	10.12 (72)	Moorabbin Oval	18,124	17 June 1989
Melbourne	2.8 (20)	Geelong	13.11 (89)	MCG	38,128	17 June 1989
Collingwood	18.15 (123)	Richmond	9.15 (69)	VFL Park	26,557	17 June 1989
Brisbane Bears	18.6 (114)	Fitzroy	19.14 (128)	Carrara Stadium	10,008	18 June 1989

=== Round 13 ===
Home team	Home team score	Away team	Away team score	Venue	Crowd	Date
Hawthorn	15.16 (106)	Brisbane Bears	4.11 (35)	VFL Park	6,292	23 June 1989
Essendon	3.10 (28)	Footscray	3.5 (23)	Windy Hill	13,559	24 June 1989
Collingwood	14.24 (108)	North Melbourne	8.8 (56)	Victoria Park	21,210	24 June 1989
Carlton	9.10 (64)	West Coast	5.11 (41)	Princes Park	11,995	24 June 1989
St Kilda	8.8 (56)	Melbourne	10.4 (64)	Moorabbin Oval	19,040	24 June 1989
Fitzroy	15.5 (95)	Richmond	9.13 (67)	VFL Park	12,424	24 June 1989
Sydney	14.19 (103)	Geelong	16.15 (111)	SCG	12,967	25 June 1989

=== Round 14 ===
Home team	Home team score	Away team	Away team score	Venue	Crowd	Date
North Melbourne	18.19 (127)	St Kilda	9.13 (67)	MCG	19,354	7 July 1989
Richmond	10.15 (75)	Sydney	7.8 (50)	MCG	12,601	8 July 1989
Hawthorn	19.27 (141)	West Coast	6.14 (50)	Princes Park	8,028	8 July 1989
Geelong	11.16 (82)	Fitzroy	8.10 (58)	Kardinia Park	18,231	8 July 1989
Essendon	9.7 (61)	Carlton	8.10 (58)	VFL Park	34,617	8 July 1989
Brisbane Bears	14.15 (99)	Melbourne	17.11 (113)	Carrara Stadium	8,799	9 July 1989
Footscray	15.15 (105)	Collingwood	7.15 (57)	Western Oval	18,775	9 July 1989

=== Round 15 ===
Home team	Home team score	Away team	Away team score	Venue	Crowd	Date
Melbourne	17.15 (117)	North Melbourne	11.15 (81)	MCG	23,764	15 July 1989
Fitzroy	12.20 (92)	St Kilda	13.8 (86)	Princes Park	11,017	15 July 1989
Essendon	25.10 (160)	West Coast	1.12 (18)	Windy Hill	11,503	15 July 1989
Brisbane Bears	11.11 (77)	Geelong	22.19 (151)	Carrara Stadium	18,198	15 July 1989
Collingwood	12.18 (90)	Carlton	15.6 (96)	VFL Park	44,548	15 July 1989
Richmond	15.14 (104)	Hawthorn	22.10 (142)	MCG	17,894	16 July 1989
Sydney	16.21 (117)	Footscray	10.17 (77)	SCG	8,010	16 July 1989

=== Round 16 ===
Home team	Home team score	Away team	Away team score	Venue	Crowd	Date
Brisbane Bears	14.10 (94)	St Kilda	12.18 (90)	Carrara Stadium	11,004	22 July 1989
Richmond	9.12 (66)	Essendon	14.15 (99)	MCG	23,964	22 July 1989
Hawthorn	21.11 (137)	Collingwood	11.11 (77)	Princes Park	20,367	22 July 1989
Footscray	6.10 (46)	Carlton	6.10 (46)	Western Oval	15,089	22 July 1989
Geelong	17.7 (109)	Melbourne	16.16 (112)	VFL Park	38,865	22 July 1989
West Coast	16.16 (112)	Sydney	9.16 (70)	Subiaco Oval	13,299	23 July 1989
North Melbourne	8.18 (66)	Fitzroy	16.11 (107)	MCG	13,173	23 July 1989

=== Round 17 ===
Home team	Home team score	Away team	Away team score	Venue	Crowd	Date
Richmond	6.15 (51)	Fitzroy	18.15 (123)	MCG	15,045	28 July 1989
Carlton	15.16 (106)	Melbourne	10.19 (79)	Princes Park	20,277	29 July 1989
St Kilda	16.10 (106)	Essendon	20.13 (133)	Moorabbin Oval	17,000	29 July 1989
North Melbourne	9.24 (78)	Hawthorn	23.16 (154)	VFL Park	15,523	29 July 1989
Collingwood	19.11 (125)	Geelong	14.20 (104)	MCG	35,217	29 July 1989
Footscray	10.12 (72)	West Coast	16.13 (109)	Western Oval	9,467	30 July 1989
Sydney	12.23 (95)	Brisbane Bears	9.16 (70)	SCG	7,437	30 July 1989

=== Round 18 ===
Home team	Home team score	Away team	Away team score	Venue	Crowd	Date
Fitzroy	23.13 (151)	Melbourne	15.13 (103)	Princes Park	11,236	5 August 1989
Collingwood	11.15 (81)	Sydney	12.13 (85)	Victoria Park	17,621	5 August 1989
Brisbane Bears	25.17 (167)	North Melbourne	12.12 (84)	Carrara Stadium	9,606	5 August 1989
St Kilda	13.12 (90)	Geelong	17.11 (113)	Moorabbin Oval	14,243	5 August 1989
Carlton	14.6 (90)	Hawthorn	14.11 (95)	VFL Park	33,615	5 August 1989
West Coast	19.16 (130)	Richmond	10.19 (79)	Subiaco Oval	17,660	6 August 1989
Footscray	3.5 (23)	Essendon	7.9 (51)	Western Oval	16,005	6 August 1989

=== Round 19 ===
Home team	Home team score	Away team	Away team score	Venue	Crowd	Date
Richmond	11.10 (76)	Carlton	15.14 (104)	VFL Park	14,783	11 August 1989
Fitzroy	11.6 (72)	West Coast	5.10 (40)	Princes Park	6,920	12 August 1989
Essendon	15.11 (101)	Brisbane Bears	7.5 (47)	Windy Hill	11,878	12 August 1989
Melbourne	9.9 (63)	Hawthorn	12.15 (87)	VFL Park	28,117	12 August 1989
Geelong	18.16 (124)	Footscray	10.14 (74)	Kardinia Park	17,977	12 August 1989
North Melbourne	11.14 (80)	Collingwood	11.12 (78)	VFL Park	21,027	13 August 1989
Sydney	25.9 (159)	St Kilda	16.13 (109)	SCG	11,583	13 August 1989

=== Round 20 ===
Home team	Home team score	Away team	Away team score	Venue	Crowd	Date
West Coast	18.18 (126)	Geelong	12.10 (82)	WACA Ground	15,721	18 August 1989
Melbourne	14.14 (98)	Sydney	12.15 (87)	MCG	16,304	19 August 1989
Footscray	15.17 (107)	Richmond	3.11 (29)	Western Oval	8,673	19 August 1989
Essendon	19.14 (128)	North Melbourne	17.10 (112)	Windy Hill	15,912	19 August 1989
Carlton	20.13 (133)	St Kilda	20.12 (132)	Princes Park	15,227	19 August 1989
Fitzroy	10.11 (71)	Collingwood	14.20 (104)	VFL Park	42,111	19 August 1989
Brisbane Bears	12.5 (77)	Hawthorn	9.7 (61)	Carrara Stadium	9,093	20 August 1989

=== Round 21 ===
Home team	Home team score	Away team	Away team score	Venue	Crowd	Date
Sydney	15.20 (110)	Essendon	15.14 (104)	SCG	12,042	25 August 1989
Melbourne	10.12 (72)	St Kilda	16.8 (104)	MCG	19,645	26 August 1989
Geelong	20.19 (139)	North Melbourne	17.15 (117)	Kardinia Park	16,940	26 August 1989
Collingwood	12.11 (83)	Richmond	4.13 (37)	Victoria Park	16,657	26 August 1989
Hawthorn	19.20 (134)	Footscray	8.11 (59)	Princes Park	10,178	26 August 1989
Fitzroy	10.8 (68)	Brisbane Bears	12.9 (81)	VFL Park	6,622	26 August 1989
West Coast	21.22 (148)	Carlton	10.12 (72)	Subiaco Oval	23,781	27 August 1989

=== Round 22 ===
Home team	Home team score	Away team	Away team score	Venue	Crowd	Date
North Melbourne	13.15 (93)	Sydney	21.10 (136)	MCG	9,235	1 September 1989
Geelong	23.24 (162)	Richmond	12.14 (86)	Kardinia Park	20,743	2 September 1989
Fitzroy	13.18 (96)	Footscray	12.9 (81)	Princes Park	8,961	2 September 1989
Collingwood	20.9 (129)	West Coast	11.14 (80)	Victoria Park	18,118	2 September 1989
Melbourne	13.11 (89)	Essendon	16.12 (108)	MCG	41,080	2 September 1989
Hawthorn	28.13 (181)	St Kilda	13.13 (91)	VFL Park	25,532	2 September 1989
Brisbane Bears	15.15 (105)	Carlton	10.10 (70)	Carrara Stadium	15,409	3 September 1989

== Ladder ==
(P)	Premiers
	Qualified for finals

#	Team	P	W	L	D	PF	PA	%	Pts
1	Hawthorn (P)	22	19	3	0	2678	1748	153.2	76
2	Essendon	22	17	5	0	2240	1705	131.4	68
3	Geelong	22	16	6	0	2916	1987	146.8	64
4	Melbourne	22	14	8	0	1876	1944	96.5	56
5	Collingwood	22	13	9	0	2216	1964	112.8	52
6	Fitzroy	22	12	10	0	2069	2125	97.4	48
7	Sydney	22	11	11	0	1959	1958	100.1	44
8	Carlton	22	9	12	1	1921	2079	92.4	38
9	North Melbourne	22	9	13	0	2061	2301	89.6	36
10	Brisbane Bears	22	8	14	0	1792	2274	78.8	32
11	West Coast	22	7	15	0	1948	2247	86.7	28
12	St Kilda	22	7	15	0	2108	2502	84.3	28
13	Footscray	22	6	15	1	1614	1855	87.0	26
14	Richmond	22	5	17	0	1725	2434	70.9	20

Rules for classification: 1. premiership points; 2. percentage; 3. points for
Average score: 94.6
Source: AFL Tables

== Finals series ==
=== Finals week 1 ===
	Elimination Final
Saturday, 9 September (2:30 pm)	Melbourne 17.9 (111)	def.	Collingwood 13.10 (88)	VFL Park (crowd: 63062)	Report

	Qualifying Final
Sunday, 10 September (2:30 pm)	Essendon 24.13 (157)	def.	Geelong 11.15 (81)	MCG (crowd: 75861)	Report

=== Finals week 2 ===
	Semi-finals
SF1: Sunday, 17 September (2:30 pm)	Geelong 22.21 (153)	def.	Melbourne 12.18 (90)	MCG (crowd: 69082)	Report
SF2: Saturday, 16 September (2:30 pm)	Hawthorn 16.16 (112)	def.	Essendon 11.10 (76)	VFL Park (crowd: 66003)	Report

=== Preliminary final ===
	Preliminary final
Saturday, 23 September (2:30 pm)	Essendon 10.10 (70)	def. by	Geelong 24.20 (164)	VFL Park (crowd: 67,892)	Report

=== Grand final ===
	Grand final
Saturday, 30 September (2:50 pm)	Hawthorn 21.18 (144)	def.	Geelong 21.12 (138)	MCG (crowd: 94,796)	Report
Hawthorn won their 8th VFL premiership and first back-to-back set.; Allan Jeans won his fourth Jock McHale Medal.

== Foster's Cup ==
In addition, four of the clubs also played in an international exhibition offseason tournament in October with games in Toronto, Miami Gardens and London.

Semifinals
12 October, SkyDome
Geelong	13.12 (90)
Melbourne	14.19 (103)
14 October, Joe Robbie Stadium
Hawthorn	15.20 (110)
Essendon	18.16 (124)

Final
22 October, The Oval
Melbourne	12.10 (82)
Essendon	6.10 (46)

== Season notes ==
- In round 6, Hawthorn 26.15 (171) defeated Geelong 25.13 (163). As of 2024, Geelong's score holds the record for the highest losing score in a VFL/AFL match. Hawthorn trailed by as much as 56 points during the match before coming from behind to win.
- The Tribunal was given extra authority when trial by video was introduced in Round 6. Fitzroy's Michael Conlan and Collingwood's Doug Barwick became the first League players charged by the Commission on video evidence and both were suspended by the Tribunal.
- The wettest Melbourne winter since 1952 saw horrible conditions between Rounds 11 and 13 that produced several unusually low scores:
1. in round 11 on the Saturday before the Queen's Birthday, Fitzroy's score of 1.8 (14) was the lowest since Footscray kicked 1.8 (14) against Geelong in 1965, and the first single goal score since Carlton's 1.11 (17) on Anzac Day of 1968.
2. on the same day, Brad Hardie kicked 3.4 (22) – with all three goals coming in the first fifteen minutes – of only 3.8 (26) scored by Brisbane, this being the first time a player had kicked all his team's goals (based on a qualification of a team total of three or more goals) since Alex Ruscuklic in 1967.
3. in Round 13, Essendon and Footscray played the lowest scoring game since the 1927 grand final, with the teams combining for only 6.15 (51) on a muddy Windy Hill.
- Geelong set a record for the most points scored in the home-and-away season, 2916. Footscray's season aggregate score of 1614 points was the lowest since 1972.

== Awards ==
- The Leigh Matthews Trophy was awarded to Tim Watson of Essendon.
- The Norm Smith Medal was awarded to Gary Ablett of Geelong.
- The under 19's grand final won by Richmond against North Melbourne. Due to a draw in the earlier rounds of the finals, the grand final was a standalone match played at VFL Park one week after the senior grand final.
- The reserves grand final won by Fitzroy against Geelong (main: 1989 VFL reserves season).
- The seniors grand final won by Hawthorn against Geelong.

== Sources ==
- 1989 VFL season at AFL Tables
- 1989 VFL season at Australian Football
