= 1987 VFL grand final =

Grand final of the 1987 Victorian Football League season

1987 VFL Grand Final

Carlton	Hawthorn
15.14 (104)	9.17 (71)
	1	2	3	4
CAR	3.5 (23)	6.8 (44)	10.11 (71)	15.14 (104)
HAW	4.2 (26)	4.9 (33)	7.13 (55)	9.17 (71)
- Date: 26 September 1987
- Stadium: Melbourne Cricket Ground, Melbourne, Australia
- Attendance: 92,754
- Favourite: Carlton
- Umpires: Robinson, Sawers
- Coin toss won by: Hawthorn
- Kicked toward: City End

Ceremonies
- National anthem: Daryl Somers

Accolades
- Norm Smith Medallist: David Rhys-Jones
- Jock McHale Medallist: Robert Walls

Broadcast in Australia
- Network: ABC (Victoria only) and Broadcom (on sold rights to different TV stations in different states)
- Commentators: ABC: Tim Lane (host and commentator); Drew Morphett (commentator); Doug Heywood (commentator); Kevin Bartlett (expert commentator); Ian Robertson (boundary rider) Broadcom: Dennis Cometti (host and commentator); Peter McKenna (commentator); Bob Skilton (expert commentator); Barry Breen (boundary rider)

The 1987 VFL Grand Final was an Australian rules football game contested between the Carlton Football Club and Hawthorn Football Club, held at the Melbourne Cricket Ground in Melbourne on 26 September 1987. It was the 91st annual Grand Final of the Victorian Football League, staged to determine the premiers for the 1987 VFL season. The match, attended by 92,754 spectators, was won by Carlton by a margin of 33 points, marking that club's 15th premiership victory.

== Background ==
At the conclusion of the home-and-away season, Carlton had finished first on the VFL ladder with 18 wins and 4 losses. Those four losses were by a combined total of just 56 points. It had been a tumultuous year off the field for the Blues; premiership defender Des English was in an ongoing health battle since being diagnosed with leukemia the previous year, and rising star Peter Motley nearly lost his life in a serious car accident early in the season.

Hawthorn finished second, with 17 wins and 5 losses.

Carlton had only beaten Hawthorn in two of the last twelve games in which the two teams had met, although they had defeated them most recently in the Second-Semi Final leading up to the Grand Final. The Hawks had advanced to the Grand Final after defeating Sydney in the first Qualifying Final, and, after the Second-Semi Final, defeated Melbourne by just two points in the Preliminary Final (with a goal kicked after the final siren) to advance to the Grand Final. The Blues had an easier finals run, earning a weeks rest before the Second Semi Final and then advancing straight to the Grand Final after their Second-Semi Final win.

It was Hawthorn's fifth successive Grand Final appearance and it had beaten Carlton in the previous season's Grand Final by 42 points. Carlton had not won a flag since winning the 1982 VFL Grand Final.

In the week leading up to the Grand Final, Hawthorn's John Platten was awarded the Brownlow Medal.

== Teams ==
Carlton	Hawthorn

Carlton
B:	31 Tom Alvin	1 Stephen Silvagni	32 David Glascott
HB:	22 Ian Aitken	26 David Rhys-Jones	35 Peter Dean
C:	43 Michael Kennedy	21 Craig Bradley	38 Shane Robertson
HF:	3 Richard Dennis	4 Stephen Kernahan (c)	9 Ken Hunter
F:	23 Paul Meldrum	6 Jon Dorotich	17 Mark Naley
Foll:	44 Justin Madden (v/c)	7 Wayne Johnston	30 Fraser Murphy
Int:	12 Adrian Gleeson	45 Warren McKenzie	
Coach:	Robert Walls		

Hawthorn
B:	7 Gary Ayres (v/c)	2 Chris Mew	40 Andrew Collins
HB:	1 Ray Jencke	24 Chris Langford	34 John Kennedy
C:	29 Russell Greene	17 Michael Tuck (c)	9 Robert DiPierdomenico
HF:	25 Peter Curran	23 Dermott Brereton	15 Russell Morris
F:	11 Gary Buckenara	13 Paul Dear	4 Peter Russo
Foll:	14 Greg Dear	30 Peter Schwab	44 John Platten
Int:	39 Paul Abbott	41 Darrin Pritchard	
Coach:	Allan Jeans		

Umpires

The umpiring panel for the match, comprising two field umpires, two boundary umpires and two goal umpires is given below.

1987 VFL Grand Final umpires
Position			Emergency
Field:	Ian Robinson (9)	Rowan Sawers (3)	
Boundary:	Adrian Ryan (2)	Christopher Sporton (2)	
Goal:	Douglas Purss (1)	Michael Roache (1)	

Numbers in brackets represent the number of grand finals umpired, including 1987.

== Match summary ==
The game was played on a very hot day, with temperatures reaching 30.7 °C or 87.3 °F. This broke the previous record for the hottest Grand Final day temperature set in 1944, and the record stood until 2015. The heat was thought to favour Carlton because Hawthorn had finished a very tough finals campaign. The Hawks were also deprived by an ankle injury of Jason Dunstall, who had kicked six goals against the Blues in the previous year's Grand Final and 94 for the 1987 season. Paul Dear replaced Dunstall at full-forward. Such was the heat that Stephen Silvagni, who for most of his career wore a long-sleeved guernsey, started the match without sleeves. It was also the only time in 426 games that Hawthorn captain Michael Tuck wore a sleeveless jumper, with he and Carlton's Mark Naley both starting the game wearing long sleeves and changing to short-sleeves part way through the game.

In the pre-match festivities, the coin was tossed by Wimbledon champion and Hawks fan Pat Cash. Michael Tuck won the toss and chose to kick to the City End.

=== First quarter ===
Carlton were switched on from the beginning when renowned finals specialist Wayne Johnston alerted umpire Ian Robinson (who was officiating in his ninth Grand final and final VFL game) that Hawthorn had one extra player in the centre square before the ball had been bounced. Umpire Robinson blew the whistle to begin the game and promptly handed the ball to Johnston to take the free kick. His long kick into attack was marked strongly by Hunter 35 metres from goal directly in front, but he missed the opening shot at goal. Carlton managed to retrieve possession from the kick-in, and Johnston was awarded another free kick for being tripped by Collins and duly converted his set shot for the first goal of the game. Barely a minute later, Carlton went into attack again through Dennis and Dorotich but Meldrum was unable to finish accurately.
The Hawks had their first score on the board when a snap from Schwab from a restart bounce in attack missed to the left. From the kick-in, Hawthorn's enforcer wingman DiPierdomenico collected the ball and was charging forward when Johnston caught him flush with an elbow to the jaw, for which he earned a report. Carlton continued to struggle with accuracy when Naley's snap missed to the right, until finally Johnston picked up the ball after Schwab had lost it in a tackle and dashed forward before steadying and kicking truly on his trusty left foot for his second goal at the 12-minute mark. And when Hunter compensated for his early miss a few minutes later by converting his set shot from nearly the same position, Carlton had kicked three goals to set up a 20-point lead.
But the battle-hardened Hawks were too experienced to panic. Kennedy, who had been playing on Hunter, was moved forward and kicked Hawthorn's first, swooping on to a kick forward from Collins and snapping truly on his right as time-on began. Platten and DiPierdomenico added further goals from set shots, and when Kennedy kicked his second after the quarter-time siren, the Hawks had grabbed a three-point lead, despite having been outplayed for much of the term. As that day's Norm Smith Medallist David Rhys-Jones recalled in an interview many years later:

I couldn't believe it, as we had dominated the play. It just shows what a great team Hawthorn was. We knew we had to play 100 minutes to beat the Hawks because they would keep coming at us.

=== Second quarter ===
Carlton again started strongly when Kernahan and Hunter combined to find Bradley in open space and running hard towards goal, enabling him to easily score his first for the game and restore Carlton's lead. At the 4-minute mark, Carlton added another goal after a grubby kick across the backline from Mew put Ayres under pressure from Meldrum, allowing Dorotich to pounce on the ball and kick his first.

=== Aftermath ===
The Norm Smith Medal was presented by former Melbourne champion and premiership captain John Beckwith to Carlton's David Rhys-Jones. Normally a wingman, he instead lined up in defence on Hawthorn's key forward Dermott Brereton in what many considered a mismatch. Rhys-Jones only collected 17 disposals and four marks for the game (9 kicks, 8 handpasses); however, in keeping Brereton goalless for the only time in the 1987 season and marshalling his fellow defenders throughout the game, he was unanimously considered best on ground. It was sweet revenge for both Carlton and Rhys-Jones; in the previous season's Grand Final defeat, his direct opponent had been Gary Ayres, who went on to win the first of his two Norm Smith Medals.

After the presentation of the premiership medals, Craig Bradley walked across to injured teammate Peter Motley, who had been left disabled following a car accident earlier in the year. Bradley presented Motley with the premiership cup and his medal.

Victorious Carlton coach Robert Walls credited the hard work and improvement of his players:

It was very satisfying that we won the premiership, because the players have worked very hard. There are kids who have come into the side and are a pretty good blend and a lot of players have improved.

== Epilogue ==
Just two months after the disappointment of losing the grand final, Hawthorn were dealt another blow when coach Allan Jeans was admitted to hospital with a brain haemorrhage. Although surgery to repair an aneurysm was successful, the health scare was serious enough to force Jeans to stand out of football for the whole of the 1988 VFL season. After not being picked for the grand final, club stalwart Rodney Eade left the club and went to Brisbane.

For Carlton, the victory was atonement for last year's defeat, and it served as a tribute to the fighting spirit shown by Des English and Peter Motley (as English was having treatment for cancer, while Motley suffered permanent injuries from a car accident), who joined the celebrations in the dressing room. However, Johnston and Madden had both been reported for striking. They would both miss the first two matches of the 1988 season. After losing to Melbourne in the 1988 Preliminary Final, the Blues would not play in a grand final again until 1993.

== Scorecard ==
Grand Final
26 September (2:50 pm)	Carlton	def.	Hawthorn	MCG (crowd: 92,754)	Report
3.5 (23); 6.8 (44); 10.11 (71); 15.14 (104)	Q1; Q2; Q3; Final	4.2 (26); 4.9 (33); 7.13 (55); 9.17 (71)	Umpires: Robinson, Sawers; Norm Smith Medal: David Rhys-Jones; Television broadcast: ABC; National anthem: Daryl Somers
Kernahan, Bradley 3 Johnston 2 Dorotich, Gleeson, Murphy, Hunter, Naley, McKenzie, Meldrum 1	Goals	3 Kennedy; 1 Curran, Collins, Pritchard, Platten, DiPierdomenico, G Dear
Rhys-Jones, Johnston, Alvin, Aitken, Naley, Madden, Hunter, Silvagni, Glascott	Best	Langford, DiPierdomenico, G Dear, Tuck, Collins, Ayres, Greene
Nil	Injuries	Nil
Johnston (striking Dipierdomenico), Madden (striking Tuck)	Reports	Nil

== Bibliography ==
- Atkinson, Graeme; Atkinson, Brant (2009). The Complete Book of AFL Finals (4th ed.). Scoresby, Victoria: The Five Mile Press. ISBN 9781742112756.
- Eddy, Dan (2018). The Norm Smith Medallists : The players who delivered on football's grandest stage. Melbourne, Victoria: The Slattery Media Group. ISBN 9781921778872.

== See also ==
- 1987 VFL season
