= 1987 Hawthorn Football Club season =

63rd season in the Victorian Football League

Hawthorn Football Club
1987 season
- President: Ron Cook
- Coach: Allan Jeans
- Captain: Michael Tuck
- Home ground: Princes Park
- VFL season: 17–5 (2nd)
- Finals series: Grand Final (lost to Carlton 71–104)
- Best and Fairest: John Platten
- Leading goalkicker: Jason Dunstall (94)
- Highest home attendance: 71,298 (Preliminary final vs. Melbourne)
- Lowest home attendance: 9,382 (Round 8 vs. Geelong)
- Average home attendance: 24,012

The 1987 season was the Hawthorn Football Club's 63rd season in the Victorian Football League and 86th overall. Hawthorn entered the season as the defending VFL Premiers.

== Fixture ==
=== Premiership season ===
Rd	Date and local time	Opponent	Scores (Hawthorn's scores indicated in bold)			Venue	Attendance	Record
Rd	Date and local time	Opponent	Home	Away	Result	Venue	Attendance	Record
1	Saturday, 28 March (2:10 pm)	Carlton	15.14 (104)	**22.17 (149)**	Won by 45 points	Princes Park (A)	19,967	1–0
2	Saturday, 4 April (2:10 pm)	Richmond	13.15 (93)	**23.17 (155)**	Won by 62 points	Melbourne Cricket Ground (A)	17,824	2–0
3	Saturday, 11 April (2:10 pm)	Collingwood	**20.25 (145)**	10.8 (68)	Won by 77 points	Princes Park (H)	14,058	3–0
4	Monday, 20 April (2:10 pm)	Footscray	14.12 (96)	**7.13 (55)**	Lost by 41 points	Western Oval (A)	10,425	3–1
5	Saturday, 25 April (2:10 pm)	West Coast	**13.14 (92)**	15.14 (104)	Lost by 12 points	Princes Park (H)	10,588	3–2
6	Sunday, 3 May (2:10 pm)	Fitzroy	15.14 (104)	**16.17 (113)**	Won by 9 points	Melbourne Cricket Ground (A)	18,694	4–2
7	Sunday, 10 May (2:10 pm)	Sydney	18.14 (122)	**17.12 (114)**	Lost by 8 points	Sydney Cricket Ground (A)	22,273	4–3
8	Saturday, 16 May (2:10 pm)	Geelong	**17.10 (112)**	10.5 (65)	Won by 47 points	Princes Park (H)	9,382	5–3
9	Saturday, 23 May (2:10 pm)	Essendon	**25.15 (165)**	7.9 (51)	Won by 114 points	VFL Park (H)	32,634	6–3
10	Saturday, 30 May (2:10 pm)	St Kilda	**23.16 (154)**	15.8 (98)	Won by 56 points	VFL Park (H)	15,535	7–3
11	Saturday, 6 June (2:10 pm)	North Melbourne	14.7 (91)	**17.11 (113)**	Won by 22 points	VFL Park (A)	23,606	8–3
12	Sunday, 14 June (2:10 pm)	Brisbane Bears	11.4 (70)	**24.21 (165)**	Won by 95 points	Carrara Stadium (A)	7,284	9–3
13	Saturday, 20 June (2:10 pm)	Melbourne	**6.8 (44)**	8.9 (57)	Lost by 13 points	Princes Park (H)	7,631	9–4
14	Saturday, 27 June (2:10 pm)	Carlton	**12.8 (80)**	12.7 (79)	Won by 1 point	VFL Park (H)	44,385	10–4
15	Saturday, 4 July (2:10 pm)	Richmond	**19.20 (134)**	11.11 (77)	Won by 57 points	Princes Park (H)	9,708	11–4
16	Saturday, 18 July (2:10 pm)	Collingwood	5.13 (43)	**25.18 (168)**	Won by 125 points	Victoria Park (A)	17,370	12–4
17	Saturday, 11 July (2:10 pm)	Footscray	**25.12 (162)**	9.11 (65)	Won by 97 points	Princes Park (H)	13,971	13–4
18	Sunday, 2 August (12:10 pm)	West Coast	17.13 (115)	**17.12 (114)**	Lost by 1 point	Subiaco Oval (A)	24,502	13–5
19	Saturday, 8 August (2:10 pm)	Fitzroy	**26.9 (165)**	16.9 (105)	Won by 60 points	VFL Park (H)	14,692	14–5
20	Saturday, 15 August (2:10 pm)	Sydney	**20.22 (142)**	15.7 (97)	Won by 45 points	Princes Park (H)	20,522	15–5
21	Saturday, 22 August (2:10 pm)	Essendon	9.10 (64)	**17.12 (114)**	Won by 50 points	VFL Park (A)	27,046	16–5
22	Saturday, 29 August (2:10 pm)	Geelong	17.21 (123)	**19.12 (126)**	Won by 3 points	Kardinia Park (A)	27,030	17–5

=== Finals series ===
Rd	Date and local time	Opponent	Scores (Hawthorn's scores indicated in bold)			Venue	Attendance
Rd	Date and local time	Opponent	Home	Away	Result	Venue	Attendance
Qualifying final	Saturday, 5 September (2:30 pm)	Sydney	**23.18 (156)**	8.9 (57)	Won by 99 points	VFL Park (H)	47,752
2nd semi-final	Saturday, 12 September (2:30 pm)	Carlton	11.14 (80)	**10.5 (65)**	Lost by 15 points	VFL Park (A)	64,333
Preliminary final	Saturday, 19 September (2:10 pm)	Melbourne	**11.14 (80)**	10.18 (78)	Won by 2 points	VFL Park (H)	71,298
Grand Final	Saturday, 26 September (2:50 pm)	Carlton	15.14 (104)	**9.17 (71)**	Lost by 33 points	Melbourne Cricket Ground (A)	92,754

== Ladder ==
(P)	Premiers
	Qualified for finals

#	Team	P	W	L	D	PF	PA	%	Pts
1	Carlton (P)	22	18	4	0	2599	1883	138.0	72
2	Hawthorn	22	17	5	0	2781	1891	147.1	68
3	Sydney	22	15	7	0	2846	2197	129.5	60
4	North Melbourne	22	13	8	1	2402	2417	99.4	54
5	Melbourne	22	12	10	0	2189	2026	108.0	48
6	Geelong	22	11	10	1	2355	2348	100.3	46
7	Footscray	22	11	10	1	1959	2046	95.7	46
8	West Coast	22	11	11	0	2386	2438	97.9	44
9	Essendon	22	9	12	1	2075	2318	89.5	38
10	St Kilda	22	9	13	0	2150	2369	90.8	36
11	Fitzroy	22	8	14	0	2328	2544	91.5	32
12	Collingwood	22	7	15	0	1853	2425	76.4	28
13	Brisbane Bears	22	6	16	0	2113	2666	79.3	24
14	Richmond	22	5	17	0	2199	2667	82.5	20

Rules for classification: 1. premiership points; 2. percentage; 3. points for
Average score: 104.7
Source: AFL Tables
