= 1986 VFL grand final =

Grand final of the 1986 Victorian Football League season

1986 VFL Grand Final

Carlton	Hawthorn
9.14 (68)	16.14 (110)
	1	2	3	4
CAR	1.5 (11)	4.11 (35)	6.13 (49)	9.14 (68)
HAW	5.6 (36)	8.8 (56)	15.9 (99)	16.14 (110)
- Date: 27 September 1986
- Stadium: Melbourne Cricket Ground, Melbourne, Australia
- Attendance: 101,861
- Favourite: Hawthorn
- Umpires: Cameron & Russo
- Coin toss won by: Carlton
- Kicked toward: Punt Road

Ceremonies
- Pre-match entertainment: Olivia Newton-John
- National anthem: Olivia Newton-John

Accolades
- Norm Smith Medallist: Gary Ayres (Hawthorn)
- Jock McHale Medallist: Allan Jeans

Broadcast in Australia
- Network: Seven Network
- Commentators: Peter Landy; Lou Richards; Bob Skilton

The 1986 VFL Grand Final was an Australian rules football game contested between the Hawthorn Football Club and the Carlton Football Club. The game was played at the Melbourne Cricket Ground (MCG) in Melbourne on 27 September 1986. It was the 90th annual grand final of the Victorian Football League (VFL), staged to determine the premiers for the 1986 VFL season. The match, attended by 101,861 spectators, was won by Hawthorn by a margin of 42 points, marking that club's sixth premiership victory.

== Background ==
Hawthorn were playing their fourth successive grand final and had lost the last two, while Carlton were appearing in their first premiership decider since winning the 1982 VFL Grand Final. At the conclusion of the home-and-away season, Hawthorn had finished first on the VFL ladder with 18 wins and 4 losses. Carlton had finished third (behind Sydney) with 15 wins and 7 losses.

In the finals series in the lead-up to the game, Carlton defeated Sydney in the qualifying final before meeting the Hawks in the second semi-final, which the Blues won by 28 points to advance to the grand final. Hawthorn, after this loss, convincingly defeated Fitzroy by 56 points in the preliminary final to advance to the grand final. Hawthorn entered the game as slight favourites despite their defeat to the Blues in the second semi-final.

Hawks player Robert DiPierdomenico won the Brownlow Medal in the week leading up to the game. Meanwhile, the Blues were looking to give Bruce Doull, who was retiring after the game, a winning finish to his 18-season career.

== Teams ==
Hawthorn	Carlton

Hawthorn
B:	7 Gary Ayres	28 Chris Langford	29 Russell Greene
HB:	15 Russell Morris	2 Chris Mew	30 Peter Schwab
C:	9 Robert DiPierdomenico	16 Terry Wallace	26 Rodney Eade
HF:	11 Gary Buckenara	23 Dermott Brereton	34 John Kennedy
F:	25 Peter Curran	19 Jason Dunstall	44 John Platten
Foll:	14 Greg Dear	17 Michael Tuck (c)	22 Richard Loveridge
Int:	39 Paul Abbott	4 Peter Russo	
Coach:	Allan Jeans		

Carlton
B:	37 Wayne Harmes	11 Bruce Doull	35 Peter Dean
HB:	27 Des English	6 Jon Dorotich	2 Peter Motley
C:	26 David Rhys-Jones	21 Craig Bradley	8 Wayne Blackwell
HF:	7 Wayne Johnston	4 Stephen Kernahan	23 Paul Meldrum
F:	15 Bernie Evans	9 Ken Hunter	36 Mark Maclure (c)
Foll:	44 Justin Madden	31 Tom Alvin	32 David Glascott
Int:	45 Warren McKenzie	38 Shane Robertson	
Coach:	Robert Walls		

== Match summary ==
Hawthorn full-forward Jason Dunstall kicked the first goal of the match in the second minute after out-marking Bruce Doull. Carlton's Wayne Blackwell left the field in the hands of the Blues training staff during the first quarter. In their third consecutive grand final, Hawthorn jumped Carlton, kicking 5.6 (36) to 1.5 (11) to lead by 25 points at quarter time. Their lead was extended during the second quarter, but Carlton were able to cut the margin to 21 points at half time.

A seven-goal burst by the Hawks in the third quarter sealed their win. In the final quarter, Hawthorn kicked only one goal, but by then the contest was effectively over. Hawthorn's Jason Dunstall, who was in just his second VFL season, kicked six goals to help the Hawks to victory. Gary Buckenara, who had missed the 1985 decider, kicked four goals for Hawthorn, all of them in the first half of the game.

The Norm Smith Medal was awarded to Hawthorn defender Gary Ayres for being judged the best player afield. Ayres was playing on Carlton wingman David Rhys-Jones, who had been a match-winner against Hawthorn in the second semi-final. Ayres, playing on the wing for the first time in five years, nullified Rhys-Jones and set up many attacking moves for the Hawks. Ayres finished the game with 17 kicks, five marks and six handballs.

=== Scoreboard ===
1986 VFL Grand Final
Saturday, 27 September (14:30 (UTC+10))	Hawthorn	def.	Carlton	MCG, Melbourne (crowd: 101,861)	Report
5.6 (36); 8.8 (56); 15.9 (99); 16.14 (110)	Q1; Q2; Q3; Final	1.5 (11); 4.11 (35); 6.13 (49); 9.14 (68)	Umpires: P Cameron & J Russo; Norm Smith Medal: Gary Ayres (Hawthorn); Television broadcast: Seven Network
Dunstall 6, Buckenara 4, Brereton 3, Ayres, Curran, Russo	Goals	Meldrum 3, Kernahan 2, Evans, Glascott, McKenzie, Rhys-Jones
Eade, Dunstall, Ayres, Buckenara, Wallace, Langford Mew, Platten	Best	Alvin, Meldrum, Glascott, Madden, Harmes
Dear (striking)	Reports	Rhys-Jones (striking)
The match was the last played by Carlton's Bruce Doull who retired following 356 matches with the club.

== Tribunal ==
- Rhys-Jones (Carlton) for allegedly striking Ayres (Hawthorn in the first quarter. Rhys-Jones was suspended for two matches.
- Dear (Hawthorn) for allegedly striking Kernahan (Carlton) in the first quarter. Charge not sustained.

== See also ==
- 1986 VFL season
