= List of VFL/AFL premiership captains and coaches =

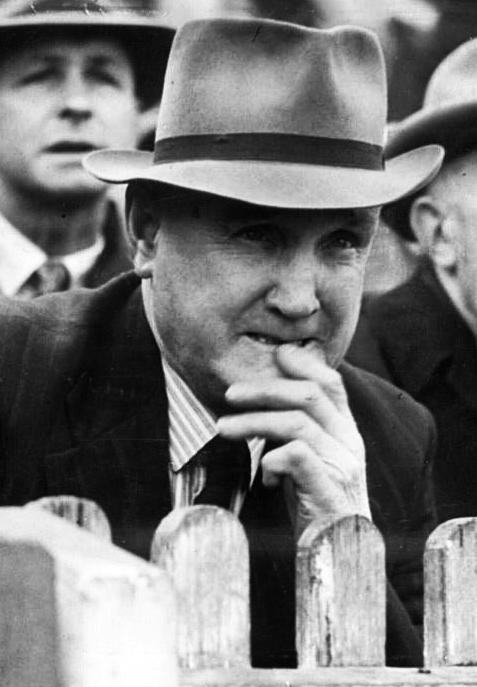
Jock McHale

This is a list of captains and coaches of Australian Football League premiership teams. Jock McHale has coached the most premierships, with eight in total. Syd Coventry, Dick Reynolds and Michael Tuck are the most successful captains, with four premierships each.

The coach of the premiership winning team currently receives the Jock McHale Medal, named in McHale's honour. The medal was first awarded in 2001, and Jock McHale Medals were retrospectively awarded to all premiership-winning coaches from 1950 onwards, which was the first season following McHale's retirement from coaching.

The captain or co-captains of the premiership winning team currently receive the Ron Barassi Medal, named in Barassi's honour. The medal was first awarded in 2024 and has not been retrospectively awarded.

== List ==
Year	Premiers	Captain	Coach
1897	Essendon	George Stuckey	George Stuckey
1898	Fitzroy	Alec Sloan	Alec Sloan
1899	Fitzroy (2)	Alec Sloan (2)	Alec Sloan (2)
1900	Melbourne	Dick Wardill	Dick Wardill
1901	Essendon (2)	Tod Collins	Tod Collins
1902	Collingwood	Lardie Tulloch	Lardie Tulloch
1903	Collingwood (2)	Lardie Tulloch (2)	Lardie Tulloch (2)
1904	Fitzroy (3)	Gerald Brosnan	Gerald Brosnan
1905	Fitzroy (4)	Gerald Brosnan (2)	Gerald Brosnan (2)
1906	Carlton	Jim Flynn	Jack Worrall
1907	Carlton (2)	Jim Flynn (2)	Jack Worrall (2)
1908	Carlton (3)	Fred Elliott	Jack Worrall (3)
1909	South Melbourne	Charlie Ricketts	Charlie Ricketts
1910	Collingwood (3)	George Angus	George Angus
1911	Essendon (3)	David Smith	Jack Worrall (4)
1912	Essendon (4)	Allan Belcher	Jack Worrall (5)
1913	Fitzroy (5)	Bill Walker	Percy Parratt
1914	Carlton (4)	Billy Dick	Norm Clark
1915	Carlton (5)	Alf Baud	Norm Clark (2)
1916	Fitzroy (6)	Wally Johnson	George Holden
1917	Collingwood (4)	Percy Wilson	Jock McHale
1918	South Melbourne (2)	Jim Caldwell	Henry Elms
1918	South Melbourne (2)	Jim Caldwell	Herb Howson
1919	Collingwood (5)	Con McCarthy	Jock McHale (2)
1920	Richmond	Dan Minogue	Dan Minogue
1921	Richmond (2)	Dan Minogue (2)	Dan Minogue (2)
1922	Fitzroy (7)	Chris Lethbridge	Vic Belcher
1923	Essendon (5)	Syd Barker	Syd Barker
1924	Essendon (6)	Syd Barker (2)	Syd Barker (2)
1925	Geelong	Cliff Rankin	Cliff Rankin
1926	Melbourne (2)	Albert Chadwick	Albert Chadwick
1927	Collingwood (6)	Syd Coventry	Jock McHale (3)
1928	Collingwood (7)	Syd Coventry (2)	Jock McHale (4)
1929	Collingwood (8)	Syd Coventry (3)	Jock McHale (5)
1930	Collingwood (9)	Syd Coventry (4)	Jock McHale (6)^{Note 1} (caretaker Bob Rush)
1931	Geelong (2)	Ted Baker	Charlie Clymo
1932	Richmond (3)	Percy Bentley	Frank Hughes
1933	South Melbourne (3)	Jack Bisset	Jack Bisset
1934	Richmond (4)	Percy Bentley (2)	Percy Bentley
1935	Collingwood (10)	Harry Collier	Jock McHale (7)
1936	Collingwood (11)	Harry Collier (2)	Jock McHale (8)
1937	Geelong (3)	Reg Hickey	Reg Hickey
1938	Carlton (6)	Brighton Diggins	Brighton Diggins
1939	Melbourne (3)	Allan La Fontaine	Frank Hughes (2)
1940	Melbourne (4)	Allan La Fontaine (2)	Frank Hughes (3)
1941	Melbourne (5)	Allan La Fontaine (3)	Frank Hughes (4)
1942	Essendon (7)	Dick Reynolds	Dick Reynolds
1943	Richmond (5)	Jack Dyer	Jack Dyer
1944	Fitzroy (8)	Fred Hughson	Fred Hughson
1945	Carlton (7)	Bob Chitty	Percy Bentley (2)
1946	Essendon (8)	Dick Reynolds (2)	Dick Reynolds (2)
1947	Carlton (8)	Ern Henfry	Percy Bentley (3)
1948	Melbourne (6)	Don Cordner	Frank Hughes (5)
1949	Essendon (9)	Dick Reynolds (3)	Dick Reynolds (3)
1950	Essendon (10)	Dick Reynolds (4)	Dick Reynolds (4)
1951	Geelong (4)	Fred Flanagan	Reg Hickey (2)
1952	Geelong (5)	Fred Flanagan (2)	Reg Hickey (3)
1953	Collingwood (12)	Lou Richards	Phonse Kyne
1954	Footscray	Charlie Sutton	Charlie Sutton
1955	Melbourne (7)	Noel McMahen	Norm Smith
1956	Melbourne (8)	Noel McMahen (2)	Norm Smith (2)
1957	Melbourne (9)	John Beckwith	Norm Smith (3)
1958	Collingwood (13)	Murray Weideman	Phonse Kyne (2)
1959	Melbourne (10)	John Beckwith (2)	Norm Smith (4)
1960	Melbourne (11)	Ron Barassi	Norm Smith (5)
1961	Hawthorn	Graham Arthur	John Kennedy Sr.
1962	Essendon (11)	Jack Clarke	John Coleman
1963	Geelong (6)	Fred Wooller	Bob Davis
1964	Melbourne (12)	Ron Barassi (2)	Norm Smith (6)
1965	Essendon (12)	Ken Fraser	John Coleman (2)
1966	St Kilda	Darrel Baldock	Allan Jeans
1967	Richmond	Fred Swift	Tom Hafey
1968	Carlton (9)	John Nicholls	Ron Barassi
1969	Richmond (7)	Roger Dean	Tom Hafey (2)
1970	Carlton (10)	John Nicholls (2)	Ron Barassi (2)
1971	Hawthorn (2)	David Parkin	John Kennedy Sr. (2)
1972	Carlton (11)	John Nicholls (3)	John Nicholls
1973	Richmond (8)	Royce Hart	Tom Hafey (3)
1974	Richmond (9)	Royce Hart (2)	Tom Hafey (4)
1975	North Melbourne	Barry Davis	Ron Barassi (3)
1976	Hawthorn (3)	Don Scott	John Kennedy Sr. (3)
1977	North Melbourne (2)	David Dench	Ron Barassi (4)
1978	Hawthorn (4)	Don Scott (2)	David Parkin
1979	Carlton (12)	Alex Jesaulenko	Alex Jesaulenko
1980	Richmond (10)	Bruce Monteath	Tony Jewell
1981	Carlton (13)	Mike Fitzpatrick	David Parkin (2)
1982	Carlton (14)	Mike Fitzpatrick (2)	David Parkin (3)
1983	Hawthorn (5)	Leigh Matthews	Allan Jeans (2)
1984	Essendon (13)	Terry Daniher	Kevin Sheedy
1985	Essendon (14)	Terry Daniher (2)	Kevin Sheedy (2)
1986	Hawthorn (6)	Michael Tuck	Allan Jeans (3)
1987	Carlton (15)	Stephen Kernahan	Robert Walls
1988	Hawthorn (7)	Michael Tuck (2)	Alan Joyce
1989	Hawthorn (8)	Michael Tuck (3)	Allan Jeans (4)
1990	Collingwood (14)	Tony Shaw	Leigh Matthews
1991	Hawthorn (9)	Michael Tuck (4)	Alan Joyce (2)
1992	West Coast	John Worsfold	Mick Malthouse
1993	Essendon (15)	Mark Thompson	Kevin Sheedy (3)
1994	West Coast (2)	John Worsfold (2)	Mick Malthouse (2)
1995	Carlton (16)	Stephen Kernahan	David Parkin (4)
1996	North Melbourne (3)	Wayne Carey	Denis Pagan
1997	Adelaide	Mark Bickley	Malcolm Blight
1998	Adelaide (2)	Mark Bickley (2)	Malcolm Blight (2)
1999	North Melbourne (4)	Wayne Carey (2)	Denis Pagan (2)
2000	Essendon (16)	James Hird	Kevin Sheedy (4)
2001	Brisbane Lions	Michael Voss	Leigh Matthews (2)
2002	Brisbane Lions (2)	Michael Voss (2)	Leigh Matthews (3)
2003	Brisbane Lions (3)	Michael Voss (3)	Leigh Matthews (4)
2004	Port Adelaide	Warren Tredrea	Mark Williams
2005	Sydney (4)	Barry Hall	Paul Roos
2006	West Coast (3)	Chris Judd	John Worsfold
2007	Geelong (7)	Tom Harley	Mark Thompson
2008	Hawthorn (10)	Sam Mitchell	Alastair Clarkson
2009	Geelong (8)	Tom Harley (2)	Mark Thompson (2)
2010	Collingwood (15)	Nick Maxwell	Mick Malthouse (3)
2011	Geelong (9)	Cameron Ling	Chris Scott
2012	Sydney (5)	Jarrad McVeigh	John Longmire
2013	Hawthorn (11)	Luke Hodge	Alastair Clarkson (2)
2014	Hawthorn (12)	Luke Hodge (2)	Alastair Clarkson (3)
2015	Hawthorn (13)	Luke Hodge (3)	Alastair Clarkson (4)
2016	Western Bulldogs (2)	Easton Wood	Luke Beveridge
2017	Richmond (11)	Trent Cotchin	Damien Hardwick
2018	West Coast (4)	Shannon Hurn	Adam Simpson
2019	Richmond (12)	Trent Cotchin (2)	Damien Hardwick (2)
2020	Richmond (13)	Trent Cotchin (3)	Damien Hardwick (3)
2021	Melbourne (13)	Max Gawn	Simon Goodwin
2022	Geelong (10)	Joel Selwood	Chris Scott (2)
2023	Collingwood (16)	Darcy Moore	Craig McRae
2024	Brisbane Lions (4)	Harris Andrews	Chris Fagan
2024	Brisbane Lions (4)	Lachie Neale	Chris Fagan
2025	Brisbane Lions (5)	Harris Andrews (2)	Chris Fagan (2)
2025	Brisbane Lions (5)	Lachie Neale (2)	Chris Fagan (2)
2026	Brisbane Lions (6)	Harris Andrews (3)	Chris Fagan (3)
2026	Brisbane Lions (6)	Josh Dunkley	Chris Fagan (3)
2026	Brisbane Lions (6)	Hugh McCluggage	Chris Fagan (3)

== Footnotes ==
- 1: Jock McHale had coached Collingwood throughout that year and into the week of the grand final, but was absent on the day of the grand final, having fallen ill with influenza. Club treasurer Bob Rush performed the matchday coaching duties in his place. For many years, Rush was credited with having coached the game, but after a decision in 2014 by the AFL's historians, McHale was credited as Collingwood's sole coach in the game for the purposes of coaching statistics.

== See also ==
- List of AFL Women's premiership captains and coaches
- List of NSWRL/ARL/SL/NRL premiership captains and coaches
