= Robert Walls =

Australian rules footballer and coach (1950–2025)

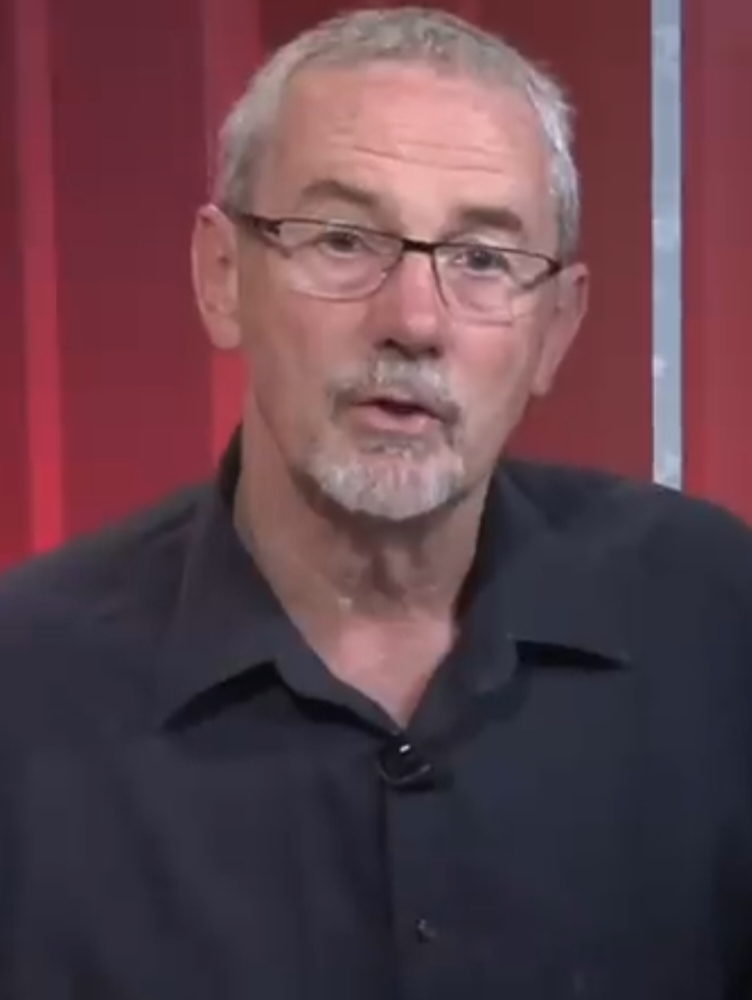
- Walls in 2012

Personal information
- Nickname: Wallsy
- Born: 21 July 1950; Dunolly, Victoria, Australia
- Died: 15 May 2025 (aged 74); East Melbourne, Victoria, Australia
- Original team: Coburg Amateurs (VAFA)
- Height: 193 cm (6 ft 4 in)
- Weight: 89 kg (196 lb)
- Position: Centre half-forward

Playing career^{1}
Years	Club	Games (Goals)
1967–1978	Carlton	218 (367)
1978–1980	Fitzroy	41 (77)
Total		259 (444)

Representative team honours
Years	Team	Games (Goals)
	Victoria	4 (?)

Coaching career^{3}
Years	Club	Games (W–L–D)
1981–1985	Fitzroy	115 (60–54–1)
1986–1989	Carlton	84 (55–29–0)
1991–1995	Brisbane Bears	109 (30–78–1)
1996–1997	Richmond	39 (17–22–0)
1999	Victoria	1 (1–0–0)
- ^{1} Playing statistics correct to the end of 1980.^{3} Coaching statistics correct as of 1999.

Career highlights
- Playing: 3× VFL premiership: 1968, 1970, 1972; 2× Championship of Australia Championship: 1968, 1970; 2× Carlton leading goalkicker: 1975, 1976; Carlton captain: 1977–78; Australian Football Hall of Fame; Carlton Team of the Century; Carlton Hall of Fame – legend status (2011); Coaching: VFL premiership: 1987

Robert Walls (21 July 1950 – 15 May 2025) was an Australian rules footballer who represented Carlton and Fitzroy in the Victorian Football League (VFL) during the 1960s and 1970s.

In a playing career that spanned three decades, Walls played a combined 259 games and kicked a total of 444 goals. Throughout the 1980s and 1990s, he continued to coach in the VFL/AFL for a total of 347 games across four different clubs.

As a coach, his greatest achievement came in 1987 when he coached Carlton to the 1987 VFL premiership, the same club he won premierships with as player in 1968, 1970 and 1972. After his coaching career ended, Walls became involved in the AFL media as a commentator and columnist.

== Playing career ==
=== Carlton ===
Walls grew up in Brunswick, Victoria, and was educated at Coburg High School. He initially supported Essendon like his mother, but he ended up at Carlton because Brunswick at that time was part of Carlton's recruiting zone.

Walls played junior football for Victorian Amateur Football Association (VAFA) club Coburg Amateurs before his recruitment by Carlton and made his senior VFL debut as a tall, skinny 16-year-old on 22 April 1967 against Hawthorn at Princes Park. He gave a sign of things to come when he scored a goal with his first kick.

Walls played in three premierships with Carlton – in 1968, 1970 and 1972. He was judged Man of the Match in the 1972 VFL Grand Final when he kicked six goals against arch-rivals Richmond in a masterful display. As the Norm Smith Medal was not awarded until the 1979 VFL Grand Final, Walls was not awarded the medal. He played 218 games and scored 367 goals for Carlton before transferring to Fitzroy midway through the 1978.

=== Fitzroy ===
Walls made his Fitzroy debut in round 9 of the 1978 season, kicking 2 goals in a losing effort against Footscray. He went on to play 14 games in his first season at Fitzroy, kicking 24 goals.

Walls' stint with the club was marred by a combination of poor form and injury. In Round 17 of the 1980 season against Essendon at Windy Hill, Walls injured his knee in the third quarter and had to be carried off. He announced his retirement shortly after, having played 41 games and kicked 77 goals for Fitzroy, taking his overall VFL tally to 259 games and 444 goals.

== Coaching career ==
=== Fitzroy ===
After he retired as a player, Walls replaced Bill Stephen as senior coach of the Fitzroy in 1981. Walls' first task was a major clean-out of older players who were clearly "past it" after the club's disappointing 1980 season, and Walls lifted the Lions to their best era since winning a premiership in 1944. Walls coached Fitzroy Football Club from 1981 to 1985 for 115 games (60 wins – 54 losses – 1 draw).

They improved from last in 1980 to fifth at the end of the home-and-away season in 1981, securing their finals berth with an upset win over Collingwood and then beating Essendon in the Elimination Final before failing by the narrowest of margins in the First Semi-final against the Magpies.

1982 was relatively disappointing due to a poor start, but with players like Gary Pert and Paul Roos from the club's recruiting zones and South Australian recruit Matt Rendell growing into stars, the Lions were back as a force at the end of the season. 1983 saw the Lions emerge after five rounds as favourites for the premiership and maintain that favouritism with a sensational win in a top-of-the-table clash with North Melbourne by 150 points with Rendell kicking eight goals in addition to destroying Gary Dempsey in the ruck. However, the Lions lost form and finished fourth after losing two hard-fought finals.

1984, with injuries affecting the club and its lack of depth apparent, was initially disappointing, but a remarkable recovery saw them enter the five after the final round only to be crushed by Collingwood. In 1985, the Lions' financial crisis emerged to threaten their future and this, along with more injuries, caused them to drop to ninth with only seven wins and two losses to last-placed St Kilda. After this, Walls moved to his former club Carlton in a swap with David Parkin in a jointly announced agreement between Fitzroy Football Club and Carlton Football Club to swap senior coaches. Walls was then replaced by Parkin as Fitzroy Football Club senior coach.

=== Carlton ===
Walls became senior coach of Carlton in 1986 when he replaced David Parkin in a jointly announced agreement with Fitzroy Football Club to swap senior coaches. Thanks in part to an influx of interstate recruits including South Australians Stephen Kernahan, Craig Bradley and Peter Motley, Walls had immediate success in his first year at the club taking the side to a Grand Final in 1986 and a premiership in 1987. Walls coached Carlton Football Club for four seasons from 1986 to 1989. During this tenure, Walls completed the third achievement in Carlton Football Club folklore. Winning the 1987 premiership, Walls had become a premiership player (1968, 1970 and 1972), club captain (1977–1978), and premiership coach (1987).

The Blues under Walls made the finals again in 1988, but by mid-1989 they were struggling when Carlton under Walls lost eight of their first ten games. Walls was sacked as Carlton Football Club senior coach after the team lost a home match to the lowly Brisbane Bears in Round 10, 1989. Walls was then replaced by Alex Jesaulenko as caretaker senior coach of Carlton for the rest of the 1989 season, who was eventually appointed full-time senior coach of Carlton. Walls ended his tenure as coach of Carlton Football Club with 84 games (55 wins – 29 losses – 0 draws).

=== Brisbane Bears ===
Walls became the senior coach of the Brisbane Bears from 1991 to 1995. Walls replaced Norm Dare as senior coach of the Brisbane Bears. It took until the early 2000s for Walls' style of coaching to surface as a method that had become outdated, and it became criticised in the football and fan community at large. Walls coached Brisbane Bears for 109 games (30 wins – 78 losses – 1 draw).

It was revealed in the video "Passion To Play" that, in Walls' first year as Bears coach in 1991, as disciplinary action Walls authorised his players to don boxing gloves and beat 21-year-old teammate Shane Strempel repetitively in the head until he was severely bashed and bloodied after which Strempel quit playing football. In a 2001 piece for The Age, Walls defended his action from ten years prior by saying that Strempel had been showing disrespect at the club. Per Walls' article:

He needed to know that he had to pay a price for his indiscretions, and he needed to be given an opportunity to earn some respect. For 10 or 12 minutes, he sparred/boxed five or six different opponents. I stood within five metres of him throughout, ensuring that he was in a safe situation. There were to be no haymakers or round arms.

Walls' coaching style was criticised, especially regarding this controversial incident, by Kevin Sheedy, who has several times questioned his credibility as a football coach.

In his last season, 1995, he had been told after Round 15 that, with 4 wins and 11 losses for the season, he would not be re-appointed for 1996. But a major turning point in the season for the Bears soon came. In Round 16, against Hawthorn, Brisbane trailed by 45 points at three-quarter time and ended up winning by 7 points, which remains a VFL/AFL record for the biggest 3-quarter time deficit turned into a win.

From there, the Bears continued their run and won 6 of their next 7 games. They found themselves in eighth position, and qualifying for the finals, after being second-last just 7 weeks earlier. They faced Carlton, the top-ranked side in week one of the finals, and went down by just 13 points, a monumental achievement considering Carlton won the next two weeks by more than 10 goals to claim the premiership. Despite this turnaround, a change of heart was not considered, and Walls moved to Richmond the following year to coach. Walls was then replaced by John Northey as Brisbane Bears senior coach.

=== Richmond ===
The Richmond Football Club appointed Walls as senior coach for the 1996 season, replacing John Northey. In the 1996 season, Richmond under Walls just missed out of the finals where they finished in ninth place with eleven wins and eleven losses. However, during the 1997 season, Richmond under Walls struggled, and he was sacked after a 137-point defeat by the eventual premiers, the Adelaide Crows, in Round 17. Richmond under Walls also sat 15th (second-last) on the ladder with six wins and eleven losses. Not completing two full seasons of coaching Richmond Football Club, his record at the club stands as 39 games (17 wins – 22 losses – 0 draws). Walls was then replaced by assistant coach Jeff Gieschen as caretaker senior coach for the rest of the 1997 season, who was eventually appointed as full-time senior coach of the Richmond Football Club.

=== Victoria State Representative Side ===
Walls returned for one last coaching role: in 1999, he coached Victoria in the state's last-ever non-charity State Representative game. AFL administrators subsequently abandoned state of origin of football (outside of charity games), as the competition had become a national game with five of the main states fielding teams in the competition, and the risk of injury to players in state representative games became too risky for clubs to warrant their support as well.

== Post-football career ==
=== Media ===
At the end of his coaching career, Walls was immediately in demand as a football commentator. He became a columnist for The Age in Melbourne in 1998, retiring at the end of the 2018 season. He joined the Seven Network in 1998, providing special comments during AFL matches. Later, he replaced Malcolm Blight on the football discussion show Talking Footy in 2001.

When Seven lost the broadcast rights for AFL matches at the end of 2001, Walls was recruited by both Network Ten and the now-defunct AFL-dedicated Fox Footy Channel pay television channel (not to be conflated with its similarly named successor). He provided special comments during match broadcasts until 2011, and he was a member of Fox Footy's On the Couch with Gerard Healy and Mike Sheahan from 2002 until 2008. He then switched to the One HD Monday night program with Stephen Quartermain to co-host the new football discussion show One Week at a Time from 2009 until 2011.

In 2005, Walls was involved in a feud with Sydney Swans coach Paul Roos, after Walls stated that "the Swans can't possibly win the AFL Premiership with Paul Roos' style of coaching". Walls was on the Network 10 commentary team with Stephen Quartermain and Tim Lane when the Swans suffered a 43-point defeat against St Kilda at Marvel Stadium, after which they were particularly scathing and critical of Sydney's misbehaviour and overall performance in that match. Current Adelaide coach Matthew Nicks was one of the players singled out, and he was dropped following the match; he never played again, as he retired before the end of the season due to injury. This proved to be the turning point in Sydney's season, and ultimately they went on to win the flag (reversing a loss to the Saints in the preliminary final en route) after which Walls unsuccessfully attempted to apologise to Roos.

Although no longer a television commentator, Walls continued as the "Special Comments Man" for Sports radio station SEN as well as appearing on its Crunch Time Saturday AFL preview program alongside Anthony Hudson, Dermott Brereton and Herald Sun journalist Mark Robinson for two years before retiring. Between 1999 and 2011, he was a commentator for rival radio station 3AW. He came out of retirement to provide special comments on matches for Crocmedia.

For the 2018 AFL season, he infamously tipped the West Coast Eagles to win the AFL's wooden spoon. West Coast would later win the premiership.

In 2019, Walls' property in Hepburn Springs was impacted by a bushfire. In the aftermath, he supported the community by sharing his skills and experience with the local football club.

== Illness and death ==
In 2023, Walls was diagnosed with acute lymphoblastic leukaemia, a rare and aggressive blood cancer. He spent more than 250 nights in the hospital over a span of approximately two years.

His son David revealed that Walls experienced some remission in 2024, which allowed him to spend time with his three children and seven grandchildren. However, the cancer returned aggressively in the same year, and he was informed he had only three to four months remaining to live. In his final weeks, Walls made the decision to not proceed with another round of chemotherapy treatment. Instead, opting to use Victoria's voluntary assisted dying legislation, he died on 15 May 2025, at the age of 74, surrounded by his family members.

== Legacy ==
Following Walls' death, a best-afield medal, the Robert Walls Medal, was instated in his name. The medal is awarded to the best on ground in matches played between the Brisbane Lions and the Carlton Football Club.

== Honours ==
In 2006, Walls was inducted into the Australian Football Hall of Fame. His wife, Erin, who had lung cancer, attended the dinner in one of her last public appearances before dying on 9 July 2006. With his wife, Walls had three children: Rebecca, Daniel and David. David went on to represent Norwood in the South Australian National Football League (SANFL), but his career was affected by three knee reconstructions.

Walls was inducted into the Carlton Football Club Hall of Fame in 1990, and he was elevated to Legend status in 2011.
