= Michael Tuck =

Australian rules footballer (born 1953)

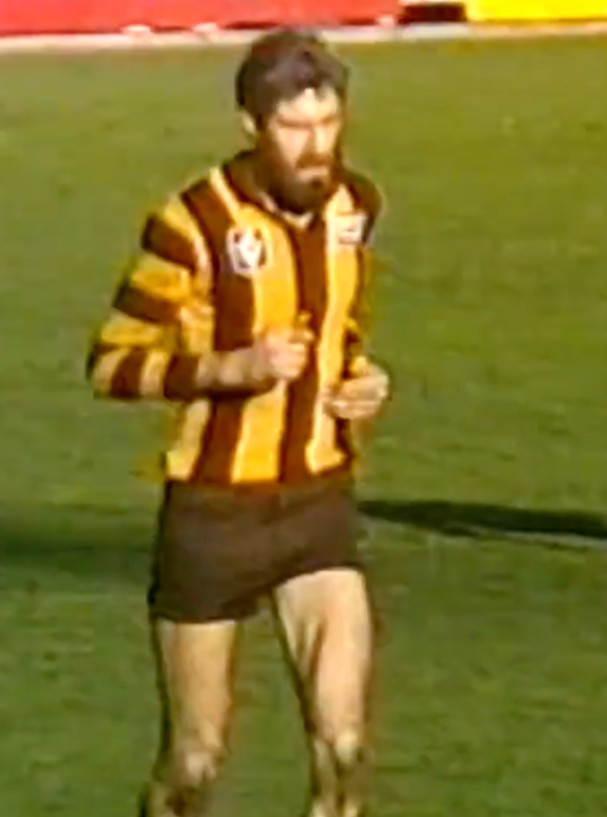
- Tuck playing for Hawthorn in 1983

Personal information
- Full name: Michael Tuck
- Born: 24 June 1953 (age 73); Berwick, Victoria
- Height: 188 cm (6 ft 2 in)
- Weight: 76 kg (168 lb)
- Positions: Ruck-rover; Half back

Playing career^{1}
Years	Club	Games (Goals)
1972–1991	Hawthorn	426 (320)

Representative team honours
Years	Team	Games (Goals)
	Victoria	11 (5)
- ^{1} Playing statistics correct to the end of 1991.

Career highlights
- 7× VFL/AFL premiership player: 1976, 1978, 1983, 1986, 1988, 1989, 1991; 4× VFL/AFL premiership captain: 1986, 1988, 1989, 1991; Victorian captain: 1984; 2× All-Australian team: 1979, 1983; 2× VFL Team of the Year: 1983, 1990; AFLPA best captain: 1986; Hawthorn captain: 1986–1991; Australian Football Hall of Fame; Hawthorn Hall of Fame – Legend status; Hawthorn Team of the Century

Michael Tuck (born 24 June 1953) is a former Australian rules footballer who played for the Hawthorn Football Club in the Victorian/Australian Football League (VFL/AFL). He won seven premierships during his career, which spanned 20 seasons.

His 426 career games was a VFL/AFL record until it was broken by Brent Harvey of North Melbourne in Round 19 of 2016.

== AFL career ==
=== Early career (1971–1973) ===
Raised in Berwick, in Melbourne's outer south-eastern suburbs, Tuck joined Hawthorn in 1971 from the country zone club of the same name, and remained at the club for his entire career. Tuck initially played as a full forward and the understudy to the great Peter Hudson, kicking 63 goals in the VFL Reserves in 1971. He made his Senior debut against Richmond in the eighth round the following year and kicked goals with his first three kicks in senior football, but soon after lost form and was dropped from the senior side. Tuck would play in Hawthorn's winning 1972 Reserve grade premiership side.

=== Rising career (1974–1985) ===
In the following years Tuck was tried as a winger and defender before in 1974 finding his true niche as a ruck-rover and firmly establishing himself in the Hawthorn senior side. With Don Scott and Leigh Matthews, Tuck came to form a following combination feared by every other VFL club and a crucial role in Hawthorn's 1976 and 1978 premierships. Tuck was a team leader as Hawthorn appeared in seven successive grand finals between 1983 and 1989. In the last four years of his career Tuck was moved from the ball to the less demanding role of a running half-back flanker, but he still averaged over 17 possessions per game in the final years of his career.

=== Captaincy (1986–1991) ===
Tuck was the natural successor to the Hawthorn captaincy in 1986 after Leigh Matthews' retirement. He captained them from that year until his retirement in 1991 at the age of 38. He won a total of seven VFL/AFL premierships with Hawthorn, captaining the club in four of them.

Tuck never won Hawthorn's best-and-fairest, but was runner-up on six occasions, and there was a good deal of controversy in 1982 and 1983 when he failed to poll a single vote in the Brownlow Medal, which led to votes for each match being made publicly available for the first time ever in 1984.

His last game was in Hawthorn's premiership win in the 1991 Grand Final over West Coast, at Waverley Park.

== Records ==
=== VFL/AFL ===
Tuck holds a number of VFL/AFL games records. These are:

- Most senior games for Hawthorn: 426
- Most VFL/AFL grand finals: 11
- Most VFL/AFL premiership wins: 7
- Most VFL/AFL games without winning a club best and fairest: 426

He retired as the tenth-oldest VFL/AFL player ever, at 38 years and 95 days old.

Tuck's 426 games was a VFL/AFL record until it was broken by Brent Harvey in Round 19 of 2016; Harvey retired at the end of that season having played 432 premiership games.

== Statistics ==
Legend
G	Goals	K	Kicks	D	Disposals	T	Tackles
B	Behinds	H	Handballs	M	Marks
#	Played in that season's premiership team	†	Led the league for the season

Season	Team	No.	Games	Totals							Averages (per game)							Votes
Season	Team	No.	Games	G	B	K	H	D	M	T	G	B	K	H	D	M	T	Votes
1972	Hawthorn	17	5	3	3	49	56	7	7	—N/a	0.6	0.6	9.8	1.4	11.2	1.4	—N/a	0
1973	Hawthorn	17	11	2	3	111	7	118	16	—N/a	0.2	0.3	10.1	0.6	10.7	1.5	—N/a	0
1974	Hawthorn	17	23	23	19	374	44	418	67	—N/a	1.0	0.8	16.3	1.9	18.2	2.9	—N/a	1
1975	Hawthorn	17	24	20	25	414	44	458	61	—N/a	0.8	1.1	18.0	1.9	19.9	2.7	—N/a	4
1976^{#}	Hawthorn	17	25	15	19	435	109	544	72	—N/a	0.6	0.8	17.4	4.4	21.8	2.9	—N/a	4
1977	Hawthorn	17	25	13	11	453	114	567	82	—N/a	0.5	0.5	18.1	4.6	22.7	3.3	—N/a	20
1978^{#}	Hawthorn	17	25	18	25	490^{†}	134	624	89	—N/a	0.7	1.0	19.6	5.4	25.0	3.6	—N/a	14
1979	Hawthorn	17	22	20	27	419	126	545	68	—N/a	0.9	1.2	19.0	5.7	24.8	3.1	—N/a	12
1980	Hawthorn	17	19	15	24	282	103	385	68	—N/a	0.8	1.3	14.8	5.4	20.3	3.6	—N/a	2
1981	Hawthorn	17	21	32	31	300	110	410	84	—N/a	1.5	1.5	14.3	5.2	19.5	4.0	—N/a	6
1982	Hawthorn	17	25	37	28	374	160	534	73	—N/a	1.5	1.1	15.0	6.4	21.4	2.9	—N/a	0
1983^{#}	Hawthorn	17	20	33	22	350	98	448	75	—N/a	1.7	1.1	17.5	4.9	22.4	3.8	—N/a	0
1984	Hawthorn	17	20	21	14	296	92	388	45	—N/a	1.1	0.7	14.8	4.6	19.4	2.3	—N/a	8
1985	Hawthorn	17	23	23	18	305	106	411	63	—N/a	1.0	0.8	13.3	4.6	17.9	2.7	—N/a	1
1986^{#}	Hawthorn	17	24	13	14	295	179	474	67	—N/a	0.5	0.6	12.3	7.5	19.8	2.8	—N/a	5
1987	Hawthorn	17	26	17	14	348	165	513	62	73^{†}	0.7	0.5	13.4	6.3	19.7	2.4	2.8	14
1988^{#}	Hawthorn	17	22	4	10	246	132	378	46	40	0.2	0.5	11.2	6.0	17.2	2.1	1.8	1
1989^{#}	Hawthorn	17	23	5	9	284	121	405	64	47	0.2	0.4	12.3	5.3	17.6	2.8	2.0	6
1990	Hawthorn	17	22	2	5	299	125	424	65	45	0.1	0.2	13.6	5.7	19.3	3.0	2.0	0
1991^{#}	Hawthorn	17	21	4	4	229	94	323	48	55	0.2	0.2	10.9	4.5	15.4	2.3	2.6	6
Career			426	320	325	6353	2070	8423	1222	260	0.8	0.8	14.9	4.9	19.8	2.9	2.3	104

== Honours and achievements ==
Team

- 7× VFL/AFL premiership player (Hawthorn): 1976, 1978, 1983, 1986, 1988, 1989, 1991
- 4× Minor premiership (Hawthorn): 1975, 1986, 1988, 1989

Individual

- 4× VFL/AFL premiership captain: 1986, 1988, 1989, 1991
- 2× All-Australian team: 1979, 1983
- 2× VFL Team of the Year: 1983, 1990
- AFLPA best captain: 1986
- Hawthorn captain: 1986-1991
- 2× Victoria Australian rules football team: 1983, 1984
- Australian Football Hall of Fame
- Hawthorn Hall of Fame – Legend status
- Hawthorn Team of the Century
- Hawthorn life member

== Legacy ==
Tuck was a skinny ruck-rover with great stamina as evidenced by the length of his career. He held the record as the VFL/AFL games record holder with 426 senior games, from his retirement until 30 July 2016, when the record was broken by North Melbourne's Brent Harvey. However, Tuck's durability is not only reflected in the number of senior games he played but also in having played fifty games for Hawthorn's reserves before becoming a regular senior player. Tuck also polled 104 Brownlow votes for his career, but never came close to winning the award.

Two of his sons have played in the AFL: Shane Tuck for Richmond, and Travis Tuck for Hawthorn.

The medal presented to the best afield in the preseason cup final was named after him in 1992, as was a grandstand at Glenferrie Oval named the Micheal Tuck Stand. He was inducted into the Australian Football Hall of Fame in 1996.

== Coaching career ==
Tuck briefly served as a reserves coach at Geelong, under former Hawks teammate Gary Ayres.

== Personal life ==
Tuck is the brother-in-law of former Geelong player Gary Ablett Sr., having married Fay Ablett.

== See also ==
- List of VFL/AFL players to have played 300 games
- List of VFL/AFL records
