= Peter Motley =

Australian rules footballer, born 1964

Personal information
- Born: 24 September 1964 (age 62); Adelaide, South Australia
- Draft: No. 6, 1982 interstate draft
- Debut: Round 2, 1986, Carlton vs. Richmond, at Princes Park
- Height: 185 cm (6 ft 1 in)
- Weight: 82 kg (12 st 13 lb)

Playing career^{1}
Years	Club	Games (Goals)
1982–1985	Sturt (SANFL)	92 (104)
1986–1987	Carlton (VFL)	19 (4)
Total		111 (108)
- ^{1} Playing statistics correct to the end of 1987.

Career highlights
- Sturt Best and Fairest 1984, 1985; Fos Williams Medallist 1985 SA v Vic at Football Park; All Australian 1983, 1985; Sturt Team of The Century - Wing; South Australian Football Hall of Fame Inductee 2019

Peter Motley (born 24 September 1964 in Adelaide, South Australia) is a former professional Australian rules footballer, representing Sturt Football Club in the South Australian National Football League (SANFL) and Carlton Football Club in the Victorian Football League (VFL).

Motley is the son of former nine-time Port Adelaide premiership star and 1964 Magarey Medal winner Geof Motley, and of Gaynor Flanagan, who represented Australia in netball and basketball, and played state softball. He made his league debut for Sturt in 1982 and played 92 games for the Double Blues until 1985. Motley's breakout season was 1983 when he played both at centre half-forward and centre half-back for Sturt and helped them to the SANFL Grand Final against West Adelaide. Unfortunately for Motley and Sturt, the Double Blues went down to West Adelaide 16.12 (108) to 21.16 (142).

At only 18 years of age Peter Motley also made the first of six state games for South Australia at half-forward against Victoria at Football Park in 1983 in what was the Croweaters first win over the Big V in Adelaide since 1965. Motley also won Sturt's Best and Fairest awards in 1984 and 1985 and was named an All-Australian in 1983 and 1985.

Recruited by Carlton, Motley played 19 matches for the Blues. He made his VFL debut in Round 2 of the 1986 VFL season against Richmond at Princes Park and went on to play 13 games that year for the Blues, including the Grand Final loss to Hawthorn. Motley played in six games of the 1987 season before a serious car crash ended his football career at the age of just 22.

In early May 1987, while driving along a divided road, another car careered across the median strip and collided directly with Motley's driver's door at head height. Teammate Paul Meldrum was driving directly behind and was a lesser victim of the crash. All three cars were destroyed. A medical practitioner who lived in the immediate vicinity attended to Motley's critical head injury, almost certainly saving his life before an ambulance arrived. Motley endured several days in a coma; his survival and recovery has been attributed to his mental determination, physical fitness, and encouragement from his family.

In 1987, a song called "Peter Motley" by Gary Burrows was written in support of his recovery; proceeds from the single were given to a trust to help cover Motley's medical expenses.

Such was Motley's impact in his 95 games for Sturt between 1982 and 1985 that he was named on the wing in Sturt's Team of the Century.

In 2015, Unley Oval, the home ground of the Sturt Football Club, was renamed Peter Motley Oval in his honour.
