= Gaynor Flanagan =

Australian basketball player

No. 4 – Opals
- League: Basketball SA

Personal information
- Born: 10 January 1933 Perth, Western Australia, Australia
- Died: 21 February 1999 (aged 66) Adelaide, South Australia

Gaynor Anita Motley (née Flanagan, 10 January 1933 – 21 February 1999) was an Australian women's basketball player.

== Biography ==
Flanagan played for the Australia women's national basketball team at the 1957 FIBA World Championship for Women, hosted by Brazil. She married Geof Motley, an Australian rules footballer inducted in the Australian Football Hall of Fame, and mother of Peter Motley who also played Australian football.
