= David Rhys-Jones =

Australian rules footballer

Personal information
- Full name: David Rhys-Jones
- Born: 16 June 1962 (age 64)
- Original team: Oakleigh District
- Height: 187 cm (6 ft 2 in)
- Weight: 84 kg (185 lb)

Playing career^{1}
Years	Club	Games (Goals)
1980-1984	South Melbourne/Sydney	76 (39)
1985-1992	Carlton	106 (73)
1992-1995	North Launceston	50 (-)
Total		232 (112)
- ^{1} Playing statistics correct to the end of 1992.

Career highlights
- VFL Premiership player: (1987); Norm Smith Medal: (1987)

David Rhys-Jones (born 16 June 1962) is a former Australian rules footballer who played for the Carlton Football Club and the Sydney Swans in the Australian Football League (AFL).

Rhys-Jones's reputation as a footballer is somewhat sullied by his regular visits to the AFL Tribunal; he currently holds the record for being the most reported player in VFL/AFL history, having had his number taken by umpires 25 times over his 13-season career. However, when fit and available, Rhys-Jones's versatility, pace and agility made him a valuable footballer; the best example being when he was given the challenging task of playing in defence on Hawthorn champion and AFL Hall of Famer Dermott Brereton in the 1987 VFL Grand Final and held him goalless for the only time that season, resulting in Carlton winning its 15th VFL premiership and Rhys-Jones unanimously being awarded the Norm Smith Medal for best afield by the voting panel.

== Career ==
Rhys-Jones began his career with South Melbourne in 1980, which relocated north becoming the Sydney Swans in 1982. He moved back south to join Carlton in 1985 after a pay dispute. He remained with Carlton until his retirement in 1992. Rhys-Jones was a superbly balanced footballer, capable of playing in multiple positions and equally adept as a goalkicking option as he was at shutting down opponents. His nullifying of Dermott Brereton in the 1987 Grand Final earned Rhys-Jones the Norm Smith Medal. He was awarded nine Brownlow Medal votes that year.

In 1992, Rhys-Jones was appointed captain-coach of the North Launceston Football Club. After playing his 50th game in the 1995 winning grand final team, Rhys-Jones left to coach Frankston in the Victorian Football Association. After three years of successive finals appearances, including two grand finals, Rhys-Jones quit Frankston to concentrate on media commitments.

In 2000, he was appointed coach of Heidelberg Football Club. After a run of injuries in 2001, he decided to pull on the boots himself. The tribunal ruling that he was not allowed on the field forced Rhys-Jones to give his quarter-time team addresses from behind the boundary line. The following year, he announced in his biography that he tried cocaine once after a game during his playing career.

== Statistics ==
Legend
G	Goals	K	Kicks	D	Disposals	T	Tackles
B	Behinds	H	Handballs	M	Marks
#	Played in that season's premiership team

Season	Team	No.	Games	Totals							Averages (per game)							Votes
Season	Team	No.	Games	G	B	K	H	D	M	T	G	B	K	H	D	M	T	Votes
1980	Sydney	40	4	3	4	30	14	44	10	—N/a	0.8	1.0	7.5	3.5	11.0	2.5	—N/a	0
1981	Sydney	30	18	1	5	175	108	283	56	—N/a	0.1	0.3	9.7	6.0	15.7	3.1	—N/a	3
1982	Sydney	30	21	3	11	186	168	354	59	—N/a	0.1	0.5	8.9	8.0	16.9	2.8	—N/a	1
1983	Sydney	30	14	9	6	154	115	269	58	—N/a	0.6	0.4	11.0	8.2	19.2	4.1	—N/a	0
1984	Sydney	30	19	23	13	178	127	305	64	—N/a	1.2	0.7	9.4	6.7	16.0	3.4	—N/a	0
1985	Carlton	26	19	22	13	156	153	309	59	—N/a	1.2	0.7	8.2	8.0	16.3	3.1	—N/a	2
1986	Carlton	26	17	4	3	166	134	300	70	—N/a	0.2	0.2	9.8	7.9	17.6	4.1	—N/a	3
1987^{#}	Carlton	26	20	7	4	172	166	338	64	21	0.4	0.2	8.6	8.3	16.9	3.2	1.1	9
1988	Carlton	26	19	17	7	150	111	261	69	33	0.9	0.4	7.9	5.8	13.7	3.6	1.7	3
1989	Carlton	26	16	2	3	129	143	272	69	27	0.1	0.2	8.1	8.9	17.0	4.3	1.7	0
1990	Carlton	26	8	15	6	52	46	98	26	7	1.9	0.8	6.5	5.8	12.3	3.3	0.9	0
1991	Carlton	26	1	1	1	3	2	5	1	0	1.0	1.0	3.0	2.0	5.0	1.0	0.0	0
1992	Carlton	26	6	5	2	27	23	50	8	8	0.8	0.3	4.5	3.8	8.3	1.3	1.3	0
Career			182	112	78	1578	1310	2888	613	96	0.6	0.4	8.7	7.2	15.9	3.4	1.4	21

== Honours and achievements ==
Team

- VFL premiership player (Carlton): 1987
- McClelland Trophy (Carlton): 1987

Individual

- Norm Smith Medal: 1987

== Personal life ==
Rhys-Jones married his second wife Cheri Donnelly in Queensland in 2001. They have a son and a daughter together. Additionally, Rhys-Jones has three children from his first marriage. Rhys-Jones and wife Cheri took over the Canada Hotel on Melbourne's Swanston Street, in 2002, renaming it the Plough and Harrow Hotel. That year, Rhys-Jones joined a reality show on Channel 7, called The Club, and he was chosen by audience votes to coach a new Australian rules football team in the Western Region Football League. The team was named the Kensington Hill Hammerheads, which Rhys-Jones coached to a premiership in its first (and only) year. Rhys-Jones lives in Melbourne.

== Bibliography ==
- Eddy, Dan (2018). The Norm Smith Medallists : The players who delivered on football's grandest stage. Melbourne, Victoria: The Slattery Media Group. ISBN 9781921778872.
