= Paul Abbott (footballer) =

Australian rules footballer

Personal information
- Born: 25 October 1964 (age 62)
- Original team: Morwell
- Height: 198 cm (6 ft 6 in)
- Weight: 92 kg (203 lb)

Playing career^{1}
Years	Club	Games (Goals)
1984–1991	Hawthorn	85 (30)
1992–1993	Fitzroy	26 (13)
Total		111 (43)
- ^{1} Playing statistics correct to the end of 1993.

Career highlights
- 2x VFL premiership player: 1986, 1988

Paul Abbott (born 25 October 1964) is a former Australian rules footballer who played with Hawthorn and Fitzroy in the VFL/AFL.

Abbott was a versatile player who could be used in both the ruck and key positions. He was a member of two Hawthorn premiership sides and kicked six goals in their 1988 Grand Final win over Melbourne.

A broken leg suffered during the 1989 season meant he didn't play at all in 1990 and in 1991 he crossed to Fitzroy where he finished his career.
