= Ken Hunter =

Australian rules footballer

Personal information
- Full name: Kenneth Ronald Hunter
- Born: 28 April 1957 (age 69); Derby, Western Australia
- Original team: Dalkeith Juniors
- Debut: Round 1, 1981, Carlton vs. Richmond, at Waverley Park
- Height: 183 cm (6 ft 0 in)
- Weight: 76 kg (168 lb)

Playing career^{1}
Years	Club	Games (Goals)
1975–1980	Claremont	91 (23)
1981–1989	Carlton	147 (160)
Total		238 (183)

Representative team honours
Years	Team	Games (Goals)
1977–1985	Western Australia	10 (?)
- ^{1} Playing statistics correct to the end of 1989.

Career highlights
- 3× VFL Premiership player: (1981, 1982, 1987); Robert Reynolds Trophy: (1981); Carlton Leading Goalkicker: 1983; Carlton Team of the Century; Carlton Hall of Fame; 2× All-Australian team: (1979, 1980); Western Australian Football Hall of Fame, inducted 2004; Australian Football Hall of Fame, inducted 2019; National Football Carnival Championship: 1979

Kenneth Ronald Hunter (born 28 April 1957) is a former Australian rules footballer who played for the Carlton Football Club in the Victorian Football League (VFL) and for the Claremont Football Club in the Western Australian Football League (WAFL).

A member of the Australian Football Hall of Fame, Western Australian Football Hall of Fame and Carlton Hall of Fame, Hunter was a versatile and superbly skilled footballer who is best remembered for his courageous, if not reckless, aerial ability, frequently launching himself at various angles, often against bigger oncoming players, to mark the ball. When Hunter first arrived to play in the VFL, many questioned whether his style of play would stand up to the physical pressure, given his scrawny build (weighing in at only 76 kilograms). Hunter soon silenced the doubters and went on to play in three VFL premierships for the Blues.

== Early career ==
Raised in Carlisle, he originally played at Claremont. He played 91 games for the club between 1975 and 1980, where he was known for his courage, sustaining three broken jaws within two years.

Coming to Carlton in 1981, he had a near perfect induction into the VFL, with the Blues winning the premiership, and also being voted club best and fairest, playing mainly as a half back flanker.

He had another strong season in 1982, during which the Blues won their second consecutive premiership.

1983 saw Hunter showing his versatility, playing more on-ball and in the forward line and ended up leading the Carlton goalkicking for the season. He also won the Mark of the Year that season, with a mark taken running into a pack with the flight of the ball, further reflective Hunter's reputation for courageous play. In Round 11 of 1984, he kicked eight goals against Footscray, and in 1988, kicked six goals from just eight kicks against the Brisbane Bears.

In 1987, Hunter won a third premiership as a club veteran and vice-captain, playing under captain Stephen Kernahan.

Post-football, he was a board member for the Carlton Football Club, serving under presidents John Elliott (1993–2002) and Ian Collins (2002–2006).

He is the father of former Melbourne Football Club player Cameron Hunter.
