= Michael Kennedy (footballer, born 1964) =

Australian rules footballer

Personal information
- Born: 10 January 1964 (age 62)
- Original team: St Mark's
- Height: 178 cm (5 ft 10 in)
- Weight: 76 kg (168 lb)

Playing career^{1}
| Years | Club | Games (Goals) |
| 1984–1989 | Carlton | 59 (6) |
| 1990 | Sydney | 15 (3) |
| Total | | 74 (9) |
- ^{1} Playing statistics correct to the end of 1990.

Michael John Kennedy (born 10 January 1964) is a former Australian rules footballer who played for Carlton in the VFL during the late 1980s. He spent his final season of football at Sydney with the Swans before retiring. He coached VFA club Dandenong in 1992 and 1993 before moving to Box Hill Football Club to play his final season in 1994, returning again as an assistant coach in 1996. In 1998-2000 Michael coached Vermont Football Club, taking out the premiership in 1998.
