= Shane Robertson =

Australian rules footballer (born 1963)

Personal information
- Born: 27 December 1963 (age 62); Broadmeadows, Victoria
- Original team: North Melbourne Old Boys
- Height: 179 cm (5 ft 10 in)
- Weight: 79 kg (174 lb)

Playing career^{1}
Years	Club	Games (Goals)
1983–1991	Carlton	80 (23)
- ^{1} Playing statistics correct to the end of 1991.

Career highlights
- VFL Premiership player: (1987)

Shane Robertson (born 27 December 1963) is a former Australian rules footballer who played for Carlton in the VFL.

Shane Robertson in 1980 coach St Domonics U/10's in Broadmeadows at the age of 16.

They went through the Home & Away season undefeated and went on to win the premiership.

Robertson was a midfielder and flanker, winning a premiership with Carlton in 1987.
