= Warren McKenzie =

Australian rules footballer (born 1964)

Personal information
- Born: 31 July 1964 (age 62)
- Original team: Mooroolbark
- Height: 190 cm (6 ft 3 in)
- Weight: 86 kg (190 lb)

Playing career^{1}
Years	Club	Games (Goals)
1985–1990	Carlton	67 (43)
1991–1992	Sydney	21 (13)
Total		88 (56)
- ^{1} Playing statistics correct to the end of 1992.

Career highlights
- VFL Premiership player: (1987)

Warren McKenzie (born 31 July 1964) is a former Australian rules footballer who played for Carlton and Sydney in the Victorian and Australian Football Leagues.

McKenzie made his senior VFL debut halfway through the 1985 VFL season, against Footscray. He played 67 games for Carlton, including the 1987 VFL Grand Final. After the 1990 AFL season he was transferred to Sydney where he spent two seasons before being delisted. In 1993 McKenzie played for Victorian Football Association (VFA) club Sandringham.

His son Reece was drafted by Richmond in 2014 and spent two years at the club before retiring in 2016.
