= Gary Ayres =

Australian rules footballer (born 1960)

Personal information
- Full name: Gary James Ayres
- Nickname: Conan
- Born: 28 September 1960 (age 66)
- Original team: Warragul
- Height: 187 cm (6 ft 2 in)
- Weight: 95 kg (209 lb)
- Position: Defender

Playing career^{1}
Years	Club	Games (Goals)
1978–1993	Hawthorn	269 (70)

Representative team honours
Years	Team	Games (Goals)
	Victoria	6 (4)

Coaching career
Years	Club	Games (W–L–D)
1995–1999	Geelong	116 (65–50–1)
2000–2004	Adelaide	107 (55–52–0)
2008–2021	Port Melbourne	244 (160–81–3)
Total		467 (280–183–4)
- ^{1} Playing statistics correct to the end of Round 2, 2021.

Career highlights
- 5× AFL premiership player: 1983, 1986, 1988, 1989, 1991; 5 × VFL/ AFL night series premiership: 1985, 1986, 1988, 1991, 1992; 2× Norm Smith Medal: 1986, 1988; 3× VFL Team of Year: 1983, 1986, 1988; Hawthorn captain: 1992–1993; Peter Crimmins Memorial Trophy: 1986; 2× VFA/VFL premiership coach: 2011, 2017; Australian Football Hall of Fame, inducted 1999; Hawthorn Team of the Century; Hawthorn Hall of Fame

Gary James Ayres (born 28 September 1960) is a former Australian rules footballer who played for the Hawthorn Football Club in the Australian Football League (AFL). He is currently the senior coach for the Warragul Football Club in the Gippsland League (GL). Ayres' playing career is honoured by the existence of the Gary Ayres Award, an annual award given to the player judged best-afield by the AFL Coaches Association throughout each AFL finals series.

== Playing career ==
=== Hawthorn ===
Beginning his playing career with Hawthorn in 1978, he had a career spanning from 1978 until 1993, playing 269 games and booting 70 goals.

He was part of a total of 5 premiership teams – 1983, 1986, 1988, 1989, and 1991. He won the Norm Smith Medal twice, adjudged best on ground in 1986 and 1988 and is one of only four players in the history of the AFL to do so.

Ayres captained Victoria against Tasmania in the 1989 State of Origin contest.

He captained the Hawks in his final two years from 1992 to 1993.

Gary played most of his football in defence, particular the back pocket position. He was nicknamed "Conan" by fans in reference to his powerful upper-body physique. He used his body to good effect in body on body contested situations. Ayres' height and weight was 187 cm / 100 kg. Allan Jeans described Ayres as "a good driver in heavy traffic".

In 2020, Ayres revealed that the circumstances that led to his retirement from his playing career with Hawthorn at the end of the 1993 season, was after a disconnect with senior coach Alan Joyce and his frustration after being dropped to the reserves side.

== Statistics ==
Legend
G	Goals	K	Kicks	D	Disposals	T	Tackles
B	Behinds	H	Handballs	M	Marks
#	Played in that season's premiership team

Season	Team	No.	Games	Totals							Averages (per game)							Votes
Season	Team	No.	Games	G	B	K	H	D	M	T	G	B	K	H	D	M	T	Votes
1978	Hawthorn	33	2	3	0	9	8	17	4	—N/a	1.5	0.0	4.5	4.0	8.5	2.0	—N/a	0
1979	Hawthorn	7	10	11	12	72	26	98	19	—N/a	1.1	1.2	7.2	2.6	9.8	1.9	—N/a	0
1980	Hawthorn	7	7	5	4	44	17	61	16	—N/a	0.7	0.6	6.3	2.4	8.7	2.3	—N/a	0
1981	Hawthorn	7	3	0	0	12	5	17	3	—N/a	0.0	0.0	4.0	1.7	5.7	1.0	—N/a	0
1982	Hawthorn	7	14	0	0	120	110	230	50	—N/a	0.0	0.0	8.6	7.9	16.4	3.6	—N/a	2
1983^{#}	Hawthorn	7	18	1	1	189	95	284	68	—N/a	0.1	0.1	10.5	5.3	15.8	3.8	—N/a	6
1984	Hawthorn	7	21	2	2	294	96	390	92	—N/a	0.1	0.1	14.0	4.6	18.6	4.4	—N/a	12
1985	Hawthorn	7	24	1	3	289	95	384	89	—N/a	0.0	0.1	12.0	4.0	16.0	3.7	—N/a	2
1986^{#}	Hawthorn	7	25	5	1	278	173	451	78	—N/a	0.2	0.0	11.1	6.9	18.0	3.1	—N/a	0
1987	Hawthorn	7	24	5	4	238	157	395	95	44	0.2	0.2	9.9	6.5	16.5	4.0	1.8	5
1988^{#}	Hawthorn	7	22	1	8	308	133	441	113	32	0.0	0.4	14.0	6.0	20.0	5.1	1.5	11
1989^{#}	Hawthorn	7	24	5	3	307	169	476	105	48	0.2	0.1	12.8	7.0	19.8	4.4	2.0	6
1990	Hawthorn	7	22	15	8	248	153	401	69	46	0.7	0.4	11.3	7.0	18.2	3.1	2.1	4
1991^{#}	Hawthorn	7	22	14	10	245	174	419	74	50	0.6	0.5	11.1	7.9	19.0	3.4	2.3	0
1992	Hawthorn	7	14	1	1	143	114	257	53	25	0.1	0.1	10.2	8.1	18.4	3.8	1.8	2
1993	Hawthorn	7	17	1	1	148	98	246	59	23	0.1	0.1	8.7	5.8	14.5	3.5	1.4	1
Career			269	70	58	2944	1623	4567	987	268	0.3	0.2	10.9	6.0	17.0	3.7	1.8	51

== Honours and achievements ==
Team

- 5× VFL/AFL premiership player (Hawthorn): 1983, 1986, 1988, 1989, 1991
- 2× McClelland Trophy (Hawthorn): 1986, 1988

Individual

- 2× Norm Smith Medal: 1986, 1988
- Peter Crimmins Medal: 1986
- 3× State of Origin (Victoria): 1984, 1989, 1990
- State of Origin (Victoria 2nd XVIII team): 1990 (c)
- Australian Football Hall of Fame: 1999 Inductee
- Hawthorn F.C. Hall of Fame
- Hawthorn F.C. Team of the Century

== Coaching career ==
=== Geelong Football Club senior coach (1995–1999) ===
After his retirement from his playing career, Ayres turned to coaching; starting as an assistant coach under senior coach Malcolm Blight at Geelong for the 1994 season. After Blight's resignation in 1994, following Geelong's defeat to the West Coast Eagles in the 1994 Grand Final, Ayres was appointed Geelong Football Club senior coach for the 1995 season after Blight handed the coaching reins to Ayres. In his first year and season as Geelong Football Club senior coach, Geelong lost to Carlton in the 1995 Grand Final by a margin of 61 points under Ayres, which was their fourth Grand Final defeat in seven seasons. In the 1996 season, Geelong under Ayres finished seventh with thirteen wins, one draw and eight losses, where they made it to the qualifying final losing to North Melbourne. In the 1997 season, Ayres guided Geelong to finish second on the ladder with fifteen wins and seven losses, but however lost to North Melbourne again in the qualifying finals and were eliminated by the eventual premiers Adelaide in the semi-finals. In the 1998 season, Geelong with Ayres struggled and finished twelve with nine wins and thirteen losses. In 1999, at the end of a disappointing 1999 season where Geelong under Ayres finished eleventh with ten wins and twelve losses and after the board of Geelong Football Club, that was led by CEO Brian Cook, refused to offer him a contract extension beyond the 2000 AFL season, Ayres quit as Geelong Football Club senior coach to take the coaching position at Adelaide where Malcolm Blight had, again, just resigned. Ayres was replaced by Mark Thompson as Geelong Football Club senior coach.

Ayres coached Geelong Football Club to a total of 116 games with 65 wins 50 losses and one draw to a winning percentage of 56 percent.

=== Adelaide Football Club senior coach (2000–2004) ===
Ayres once again replaced Malcolm Blight, this time as Adelaide Football Club senior coach at the end of the 1999 season and coached Adelaide from 2000 until 2004. In his first season at the Crows, the club struggled and finished eleventh with nine wins and thirteen losses at the end of the 2000 season. Ayres, however guided the Crows to the final series in the next three seasons in 2001, 2002 and 2003, including reaching the elimination final in 2001, where they were eliminated by Carlton, the preliminary final in 2002, where they were eliminated by the eventual runners-up Collingwood and the semi finals in 2003, where they were eliminated by the eventual premiers Brisbane Lions. However, during the 2004 season, the club with Ayres found themselves struggling again where Adelaide sat twelfth on the ladder with four wins and nine losses after Round 13, 2004. When told he would not continue as senior coach for the 2005 season, Ayres quit midseason. Though he had been given the opportunity to stay for the rest of the 2004 season, he told the Adelaide board that if he could not coach the following year, he would leave immediately. He then walked out of the club's office without shaking hands or responding to media enquiries. Ayres coached Adelaide to a total of 107 games with a 55–52 win–loss ratio to a winning percentage of 51.4 percent. He was replaced by assistant coach Neil Craig as caretaker senior coach of Adelaide Football Club for the remainder of the 2004 season and was eventually employed full-time senior coach.

=== Essendon Football Club assistant coach (2006–2007) ===
In 2006, he returned to coaching as assistant coach at the Essendon Football Club under senior coach Kevin Sheedy. When Matthew Knights was appointed as senior coach of Essendon at the end of the 2007 season, Knights vowed to modernise the club's support staff, Ayres subsequently lost his position as assistant coach.

=== Port Melbourne Football Club senior coach (VFL) (2008–2021) ===
In 2008, Ayres was appointed senior coach of the Port Melbourne Football Club in the Victorian Football League. He is the longest-serving coach in the club's history. Ayres has coached Port Melbourne to two premierships and three minor premierships, which included the club's perfect 2011 season, in which the club won all 21 of its premiership matches. Ayres then led the club to another premiership in 2017. Ayres left the Port Melbourne Football Club at the end of the 2021 season, after he served as senior coach of the club for a total of fourteen years. Ayres came to this decision after being overlooked for re-appointment as senior coach for the 2022 season, when the club decided not to renew his contract as senior coach, when it expired at the end of 2021.

== Head coaching record ==
Team	Year	Home and Away Season					Finals			
Team	Year	Won	Lost	Drew	Win %	Position	Won	Lost	Win %	Result
GEE	1995	16	6	0	.727	2nd out of 16	2	1	.667	Lost to Carlton in Grand Final
GEE	1996	13	8	1	.614	7th out of 16	0	1	.000	Lost to North Melbourne in Qualifying Final
GEE	1997	15	7	0	.682	2nd out of 16	0	2	.000	Lost to Adelaide in Semi-final
GEE	1998	9	13	0	.409	12th out of 16	—	—	—	—
GEE	1999	12	10	0	.545	11th out of 16	—	—	—	—
GEE Total		63	46	1	.578		2	4	.333	
ADE	2000	9	13	0	.409	11th out of 16	—	—	—	—
ADE	2001	12	10	0	.545	8th out of 16	0	1	.000	Lost to Carlton in Elimination Final
ADE	2002	15	7	0	.682	3rd out of 16	1	2	.333	Lost to Collingwood in Preliminary Final
ADE	2003	13	9	0	.591	6th out of 16	1	1	.500	Lost to Brisbane in Semi-final
ADE	2004	4 (Note: Ayres resigned following round 13 with a record of 4–9 and Neil Craig took over as interim head coach, leading the Crows to a 4–5 record. Thus, the first 13 games are credited to Ayres and the final 9 to Craig.)	9	0	.308	(resigned after R13)	—	—	—	—
ADE Total		53	48	0	.525		2	4	.333	
Total		116	94	1	.552		4	8	.333	

== Other roles and contributions ==
=== Awards ===
On 24 October 2000, Ayres was awarded the Australian Sports Medal for contribution to Australian Football.

=== Media career ===
In 2005, Ayres spent the year in the media on Fox Footy Channel. Prior to that he also had a stint on Seven's Talking Footy.

== Sports Administration career ==
In 2024, Ayres was appointed to a new role when he returned to Hawthorn Football Club, the club he formerly played for, in the club’s administration department, helping promote fundraising efforts for the Kennedy Community Centre as Capital Campaign Executive, supporting former teammate Rodney Eade.
