= Paul Meldrum =

Australian rules footballer

Personal information
- Born: 13 September 1960 (age 66); London
- Original team: Princes Hill
- Height: 182 cm (6 ft 0 in)
- Weight: 90 kg (198 lb)

Playing career^{1}
Years	Club	Games (Goals)
1982–1992	Carlton	158 (140)

Representative team honours
Years	Team	Games (Goals)
1987	Victoria	1 (1)
- ^{1} Playing statistics correct to the end of 1992.

Career highlights
- VFL Premiership player: (1987)

Paul Meldrum (born 13 September 1960) is a former Australian rules footballer who played for Carlton in the Victorian Football League (VFL) during the 1980s.

After making his league debut for Carlton in 1982, Meldrum went on to play 158 games for the club and was a member of their winning 1987 VFL Grand Final team. In same year Meldrum finished equal 3rd in the Brownlow Medal count and represented Victoria in interstate football.
