= David Glascott =

Australian rules footballer

Personal information
- Born: 27 April 1961 (age 65)
- Original team: Thomastown/U19s
- Height: 183 cm (6 ft 0 in)
- Weight: 71 kg (157 lb)

Playing career^{1}
Years	Club	Games (Goals)
1981–1991	Carlton	173 (81)
1993	Frankston	1 (0)
Total		174 (81)

Coaching career
Years	Club	Games (W–L–D)
	Perth (WAFL)	42 (10–32–0)
- ^{1} Playing statistics correct to the end of 1991.

Career highlights
- Carlton premiership player 1981, 1982, 1987

David Glascott (born 27 April 1961) is a former Australian rules footballer who played for Carlton in the VFL during the 1980s. Glascott usually played as a wingman and started his league career as a premiership player in 1981 and 1982. Later on in his career he was used in both attack and defence as well as being a rover. He was wiry for his height, but he lacked nothing in courage or speed and was always getting the ball for the champion Blues teams of the 1980s. Glascott's career suffered greatly when he suffered a season-ending shoulder dislocation early in 1989: when he did come back in 1990 and 1991, Glascott took over the role of Reserves captain and played in a premiership team to complement his 1979 Under-19 and three senior flag sides. In 1993, he played for VFA club Frankston.

After he retired as a player, Glascott took on the role of coach of cellar-dwelling WAFL club Perth for the 1994 season, and even considered playing again during the off-season. However, Glascott could win only ten of forty-two games in his two seasons in charge and was not reappointed.

In 2001 he was named in the Carlton Hall of Fame.
