= Norm Smith Medal =

Australian rules football award

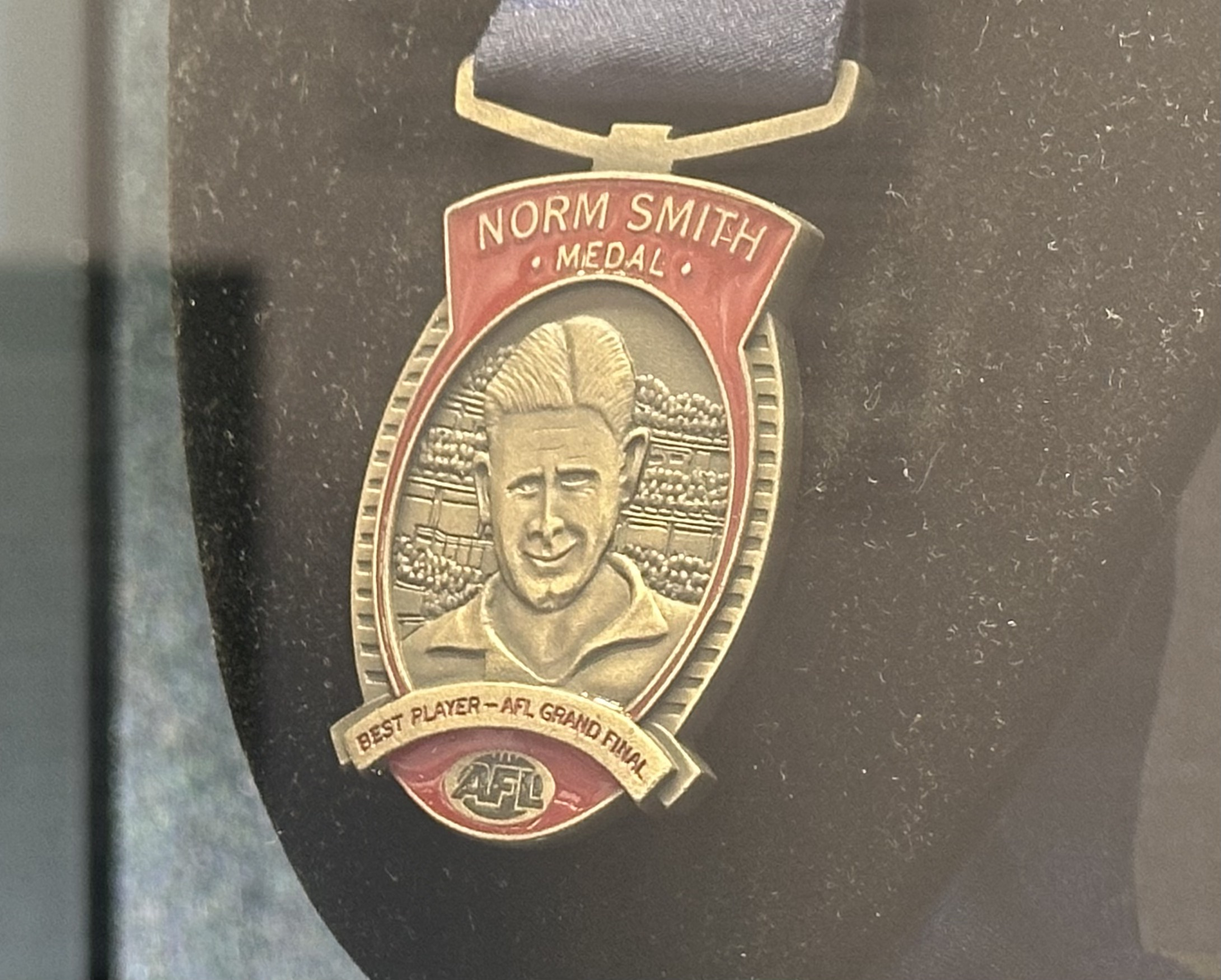
- League: Australian Football League
- Awarded for: The best on ground in the VFL/AFL Grand Final

History
- First award: 1979
- First winner: Wayne Harmes
- Most wins: Dustin Martin (3)
- Most recent: Shai Bolton

The Norm Smith Medal is an Australian rules football award presented annually to the player adjudged the best on ground in the grand final of the Australian Football League (AFL). Prior to 1990, the competition was known as the Victorian Football League (VFL). It was first presented in the 1979 VFL Grand Final, and it was won by Wayne Harmes, playing in Carlton's premiership victory against Collingwood. The award is named in honour of Norm Smith, who won four VFL premierships as a player and six as coach for the Melbourne Football Club.

Dustin Martin (2017, 2019 and 2020) is the only player to win the award three times. The award is usually won by a player on the winning team in the grand final; only five players have received the award as members of the losing teams: Maurice Rioli in 1982, Gary Ablett Sr. in 1989, Nathan Buckley in 2002, Chris Judd in 2005 and Shai Bolton in 2026. The club with the most Norm Smith Medal wins is Hawthorn, with eight awards won by players representing the club. The most recent recipient of the award is Fremantle's Shai Bolton.

== Voting and presentation ==
The winner is voted on by a five-member panel consisting of former players, journalists and media personalities, with one member designated as the chair. Each panellist independently awards three votes, two votes and one vote to the players they regard as the best, second best and third best in the match, respectively. These are tallied and the highest number of combined votes wins the medal.

There is no chance of a tie for the medal; if two players are tied for votes, the following countbacks will apply in order:

- the player with the higher number of three-votes;
- the player with the higher number of two-votes;
- the player deemed best by the panel chair.

Paul Chapman is the only player to win on a countback, after he and Jason Gram tied with nine votes apiece in 2009.

In some years judges were required to lodge their decisions prior to the completion of the match, to ensure votes were compiled in time for the ceremony. This was changed following the 2002 AFL Grand Final, after Michael Voss had five crucial possessions in the last five minutes of the close game which could have swayed the voting, but eventually placed fourth behind Nathan Buckley. After the match, three of the five judges suggested they would have voted differently if they had lodged their votes after the final siren.

Prior to the 2016 season, if the grand final resulted in a draw, the game would be replayed the following week. In such instances, a separate Norm Smith Medal was awarded in each game. Since 2016, a drawn grand final would result in the use of extra time to determine the winner, rather than a full-match replay.

The medal is presented in a post-match ceremony held immediately after the conclusion of the match. Since 2004, former Norm Smith medallists have presented the award, in the order of the year in which they won; as of 2024, Gary Ablett Sr. is the only former winner to decline presenting the award; and Nathan Buckley's position in the sequence was skipped in 2019, as he was coaching Collingwood, who were yet to be eliminated when the decision on presenter had to be made.

== Recipients ==
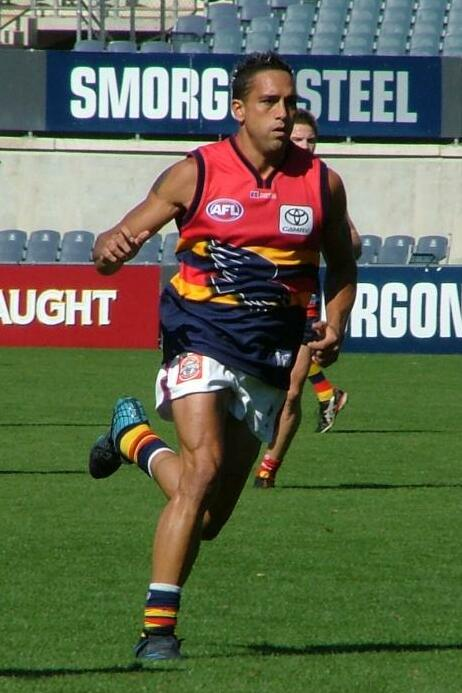
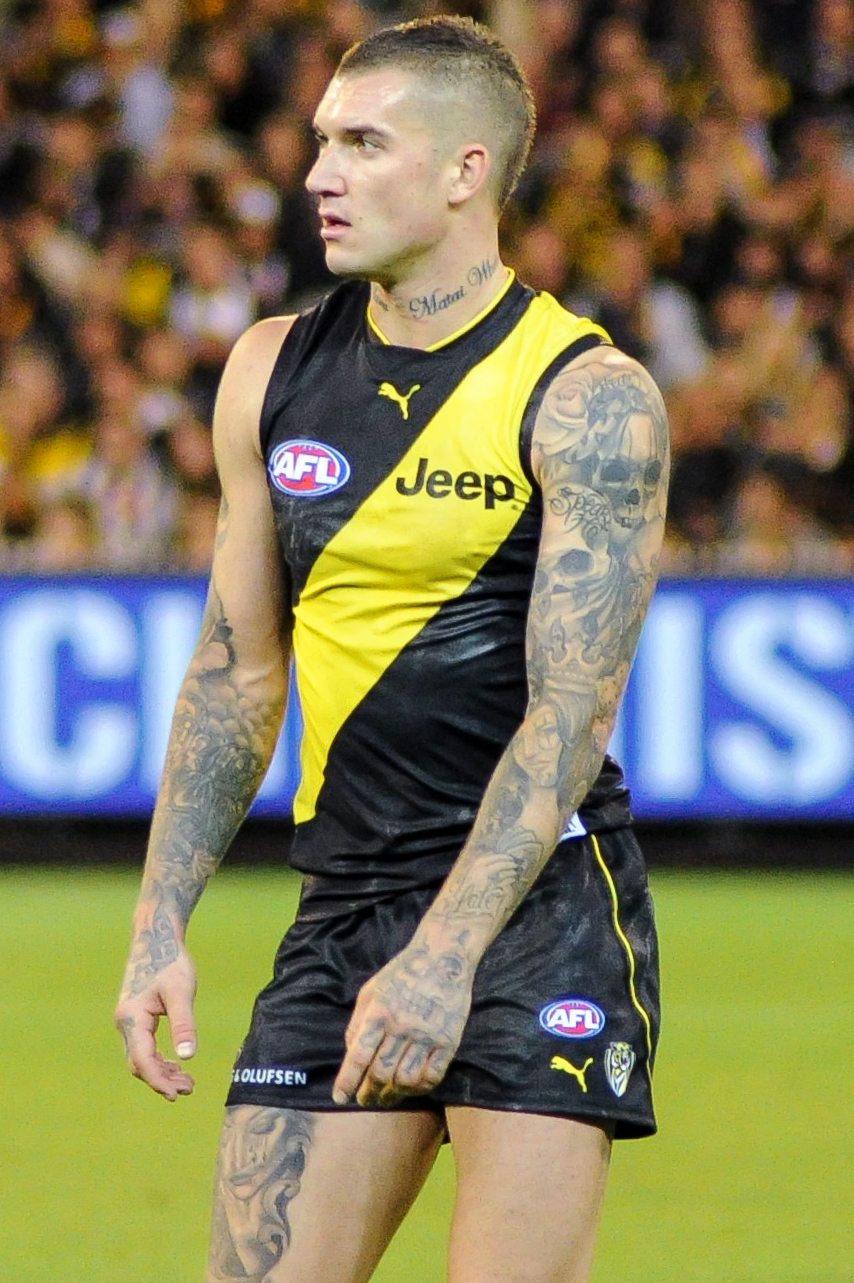
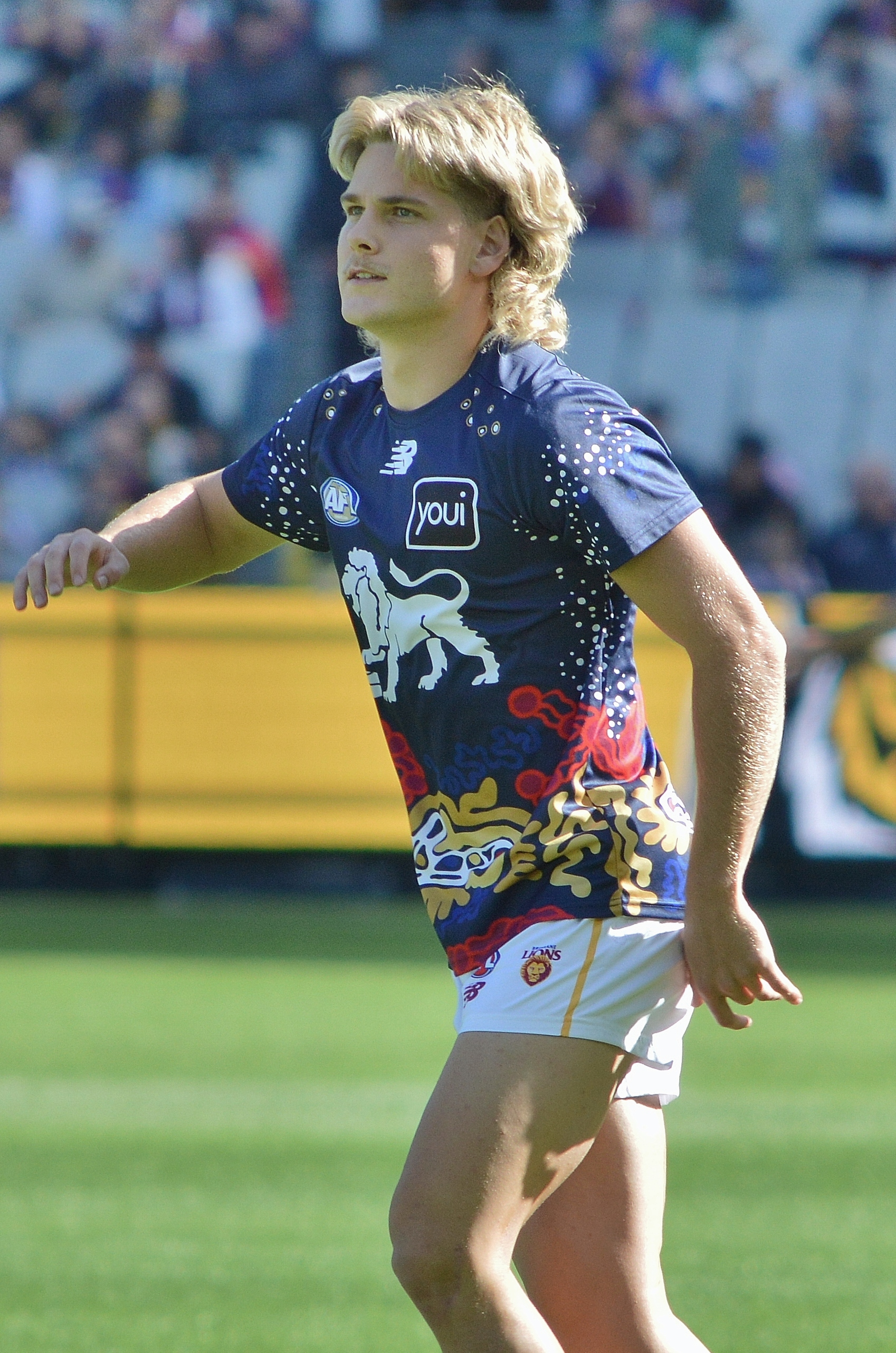
Andrew McLeod, Dustin Martin and Will Ashcroft are the only players to have won consecutive Norm Smith Medals. McLeod won in 1997 and 1998, Martin won in 2019 and 2020 and Will Ashcroft won in 2024 and 2025.

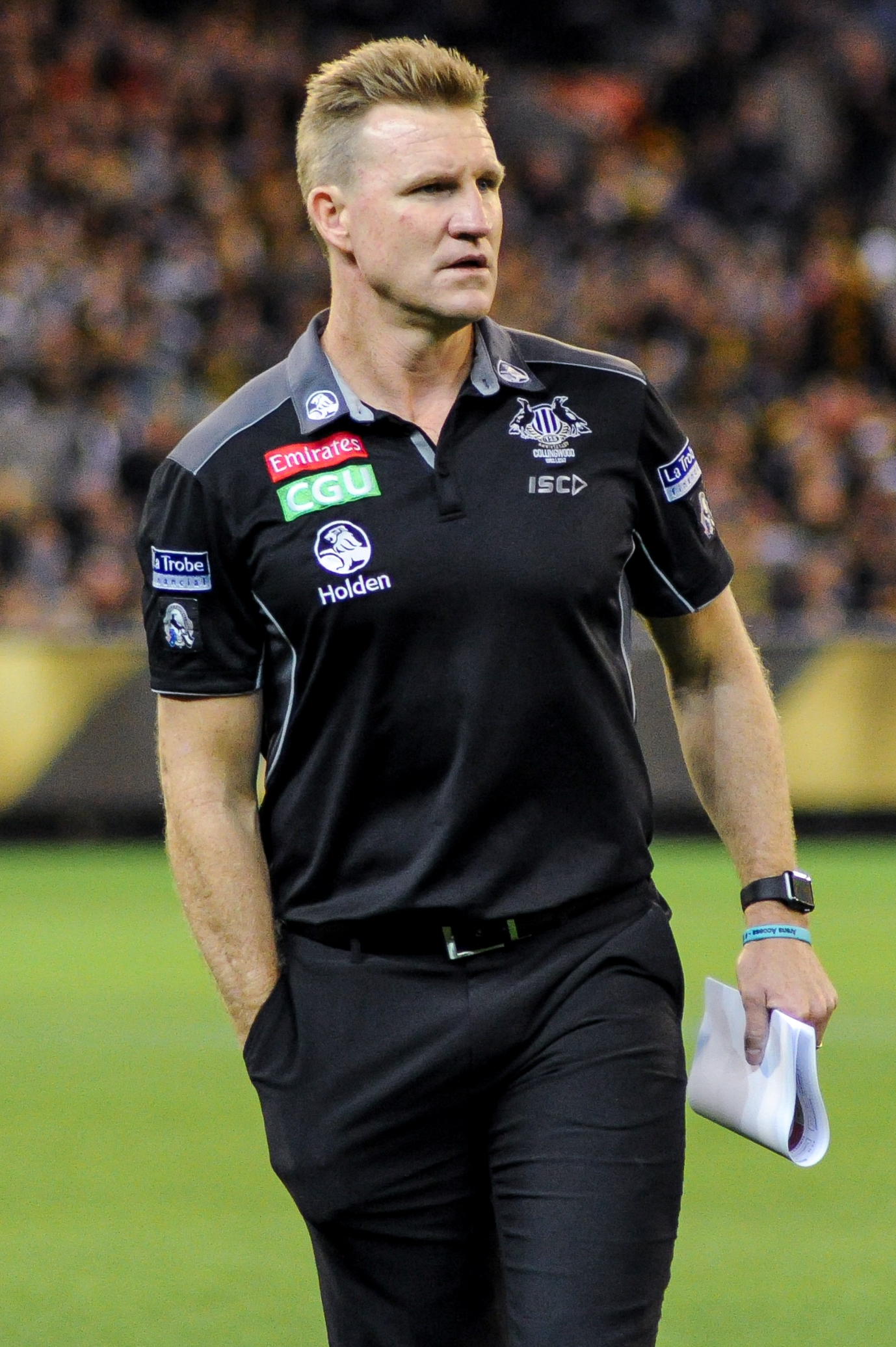
Nathan Buckley is one of just five players to have received the Norm Smith Medal as a member of the losing grand final team, winning the award in 2002.

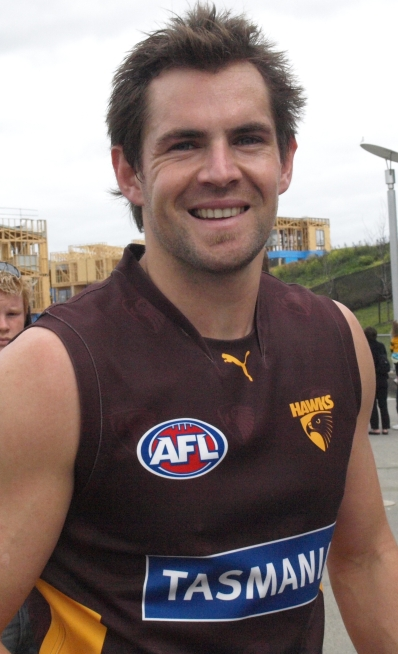
Luke Hodge is one of just five players to have won multiple Norm Smith Medals, winning in 2008 and 2014.

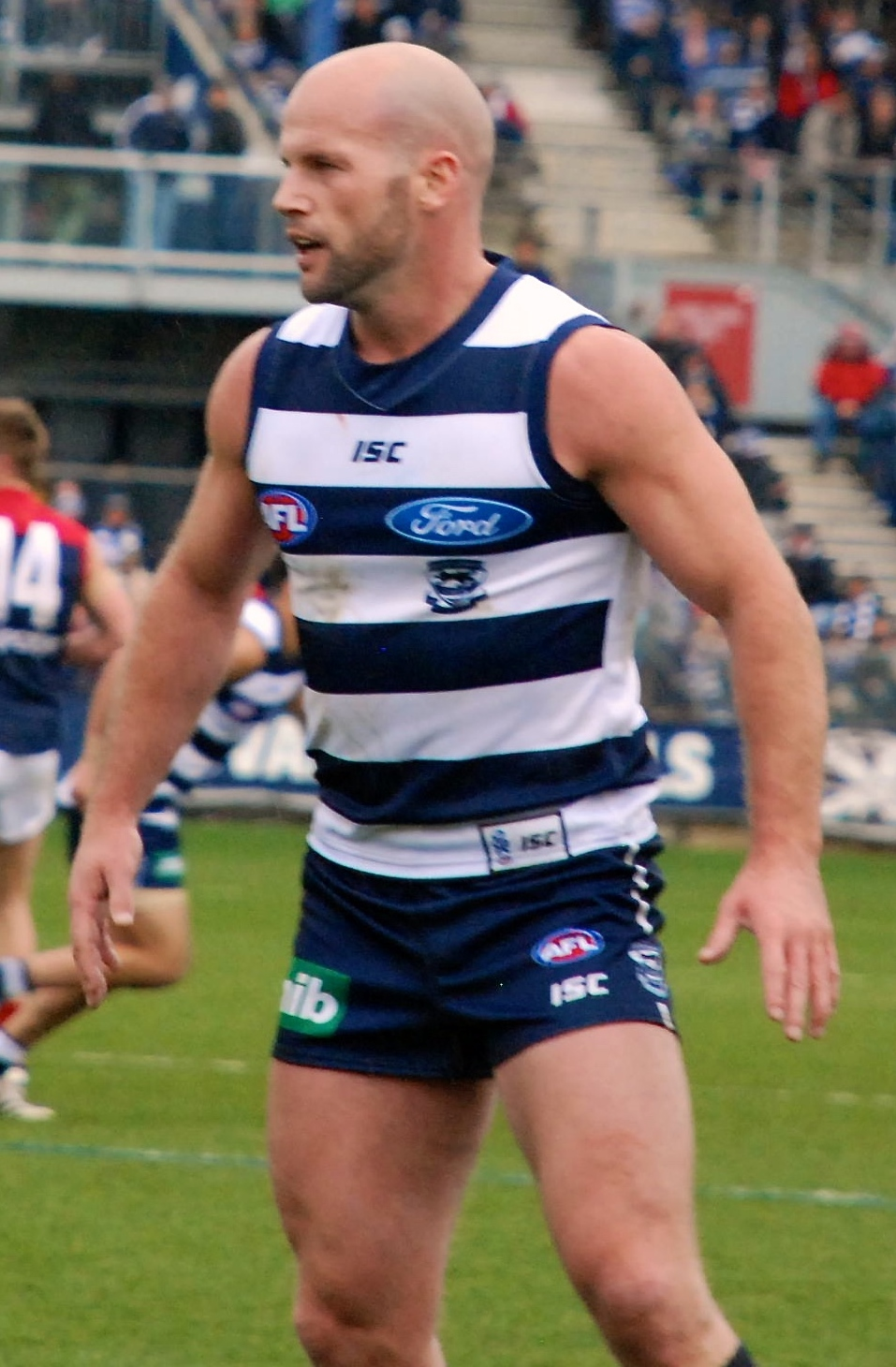
Paul Chapman is the only player to win the Norm Smith Medal on a countback, winning in 2009.

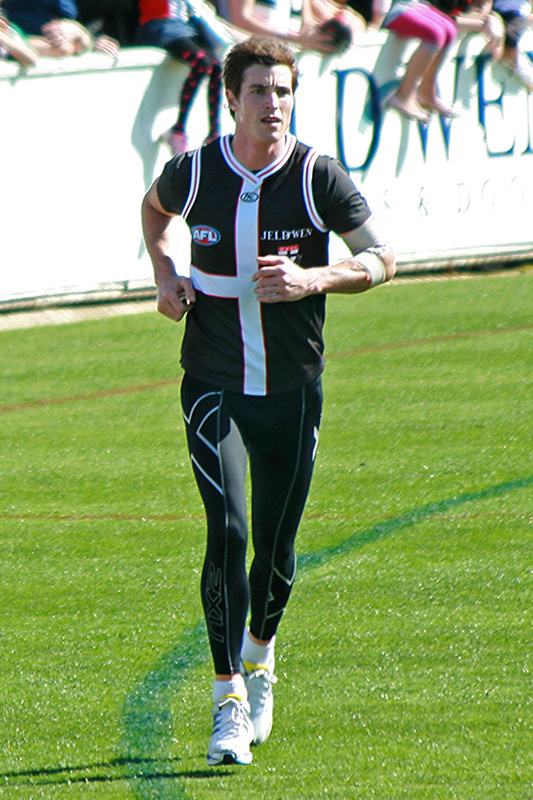
Lenny Hayes is the only player to have won a Norm Smith medal in a drawn grand final, doing so in 2010.

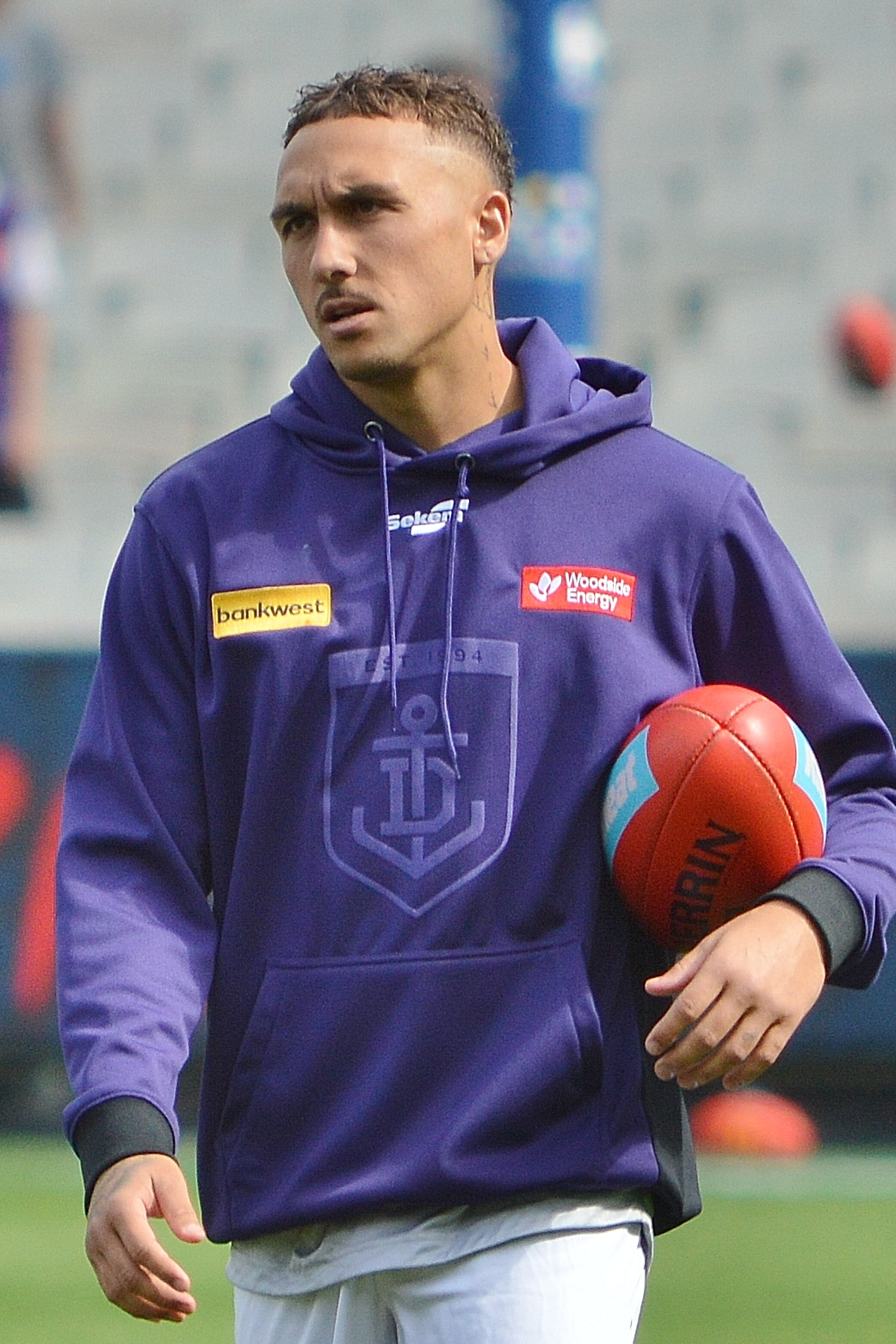
Shai Bolton is the most recent player to receive the medal as a member of the losing grand final team, winning in 2026.

Table key

^ Player was member of losing team

Table of recipients
Year	Recipient	Club	Ref
1979	Wayne Harmes	Carlton	
1980	Kevin Bartlett	Richmond	
1981	Bruce Doull	Carlton	
1982	Maurice Rioli^	Richmond	
1983	Colin Robertson	Hawthorn	
1984	Billy Duckworth	Essendon	
1985	Simon Madden	Essendon	
1986	Gary Ayres	Hawthorn	
1987	David Rhys-Jones	Carlton	
1988	Gary Ayres (2)	Hawthorn	
1989	Gary Ablett Sr.^	Geelong	
1990	Tony Shaw	Collingwood	
1991	Paul Dear	Hawthorn	
1992	Peter Matera	West Coast	
1993	Michael Long	Essendon	
1994	Dean Kemp	West Coast	
1995	Greg Williams	Carlton	
1996	Glenn Archer	North Melbourne	
1997	Andrew McLeod	Adelaide	
1998	Andrew McLeod (2)	Adelaide	
1999	Shannon Grant	North Melbourne	
2000	James Hird	Essendon	
2001	Shaun Hart	Brisbane Lions	
2002	Nathan Buckley^	Collingwood	
2003	Simon Black	Brisbane Lions	
2004	Byron Pickett	Port Adelaide	
2005	Chris Judd^	West Coast	
2006	Andrew Embley	West Coast	
2007	Steve Johnson	Geelong	
2008	Luke Hodge	Hawthorn	
2009	Paul Chapman	Geelong	
2010	Lenny Hayes	St Kilda	
2010 (R)	Scott Pendlebury	Collingwood	
2011	Jimmy Bartel	Geelong	
2012	Ryan O'Keefe	Sydney	
2013	Brian Lake	Hawthorn	
2014	Luke Hodge (2)	Hawthorn	
2015	Cyril Rioli	Hawthorn	
2016	Jason Johannisen	Western Bulldogs	
2017	Dustin Martin	Richmond	
2018	Luke Shuey	West Coast	
2019	Dustin Martin (2)	Richmond	
2020	Dustin Martin (3)	Richmond	
2021	Christian Petracca	Melbourne	
2022	Isaac Smith	Geelong	
2023	Bobby Hill	Collingwood	
2024	Will Ashcroft	Brisbane Lions	
2025	Will Ashcroft (2)	Brisbane Lions	
2026	Shai Bolton^	Fremantle	

=== Players with multiple wins ===
Table of multiple recipients
Player	Team	Medals	Years
Dustin Martin	Richmond	3	2017, 2019, 2020
Gary Ayres	Hawthorn	2	1986, 1988
Andrew McLeod	Adelaide	2	1997, 1998
Luke Hodge	Hawthorn	2	2008, 2014
Will Ashcroft	Brisbane Lions	2	2024, 2025

=== Club totals ===
Table of clubs' totals
Club	Total	Years
Hawthorn	8	1983, 1986, 1988, 1991, 2008, 2013, 2014, 2015
Geelong	5	1989, 2007, 2009, 2011, 2022
Richmond	5	1980, 1982, 2017, 2019, 2020
West Coast	5	1992, 1994, 2005, 2006, 2018
Carlton	4	1979, 1981, 1987, 1995
Collingwood	4	1990, 2002, 2010 replay, 2023
Essendon	4	1984, 1985, 1993, 2000
Brisbane Lions	4	2001, 2003, 2024, 2025
Adelaide	2	1997, 1998
North Melbourne	2	1996, 1999
Port Adelaide	1	2004
St Kilda	1	2010
Sydney	1	2012
Western Bulldogs	1	2016
Melbourne	1	2021
Fremantle	1	2026
Greater Western Sydney	0	—
Gold Coast	0	—

== See also ==
- Jack Oatey Medal
- Simpson Medal
- Norm Goss Memorial Medal
- Clive Churchill Medal

== Bibliography ==
- Holmesby, Russell; Main, Jim (2009). The Encyclopedia of AFL Footballers: every AFL/VFL player since 1897 (8th ed.). Melbourne, Victoria: Bas Publishing. ISBN 978-1-921496-00-4.
- Lovett, Michael, ed. (2010). AFL Record Season Guide 2010. G. Slattery. ISBN 978-0-9806274-5-9.
