= 1986 VFL season =

90th season of the Victorian Football League (VFL)

1986 VFL premiership season
- Teams: 12
- Premiers: Hawthorn; 6th premiership
- Minor premiers: Hawthorn; 5th minor premiership
- Night series: Hawthorn; 3rd Night series win
- Brownlow Medallist: Greg Williams (Sydney); Robert DiPierdomenico (Hawthorn)
- Coleman Medallist: Brian Taylor (Collingwood)

Attendance
- Matches played: 138
- Total attendance: 3,395,611 (24,606 per match)
- Highest: 101,861

The 1986 VFL season was the 90th season of the Victorian Football League (VFL), the highest level senior Australian rules football competition in Victoria. The season featured twelve clubs, ran from 29 March until 27 September, and comprised a 22-game home-and-away season followed by a finals series featuring the top five clubs.

The premiership was won by the Hawthorn Football Club for the sixth time, after it defeated Carlton by 42 points in the 1986 VFL Grand Final.

== Night series ==
Hawthorn defeated Carlton 9.12 (66) to 5.6 (36) in the final.

== Home-and-away season ==
=== Round 1 ===
Home team	Home team score	Away team	Away team score	Venue	Crowd	Date
Collingwood	10.8 (68)	Essendon	19.19 (133)	Victoria Park	28,634	29 March 1986
Richmond	19.14 (128)	Melbourne	20.18 (138)	MCG	25,219	29 March 1986
Geelong	11.18 (84)	Fitzroy	16.16 (112)	Kardinia Park	21,500	29 March 1986
North Melbourne	15.11 (101)	Sydney	20.6 (126)	MCG	22,579	31 March 1986
Footscray	14.23 (107)	St Kilda	12.18 (90)	Western Oval	22,499	31 March 1986
Hawthorn	17.11 (113)	Carlton	11.11 (77)	VFL Park	48,107	31 March 1986

=== Round 2 ===
Home team	Home team score	Away team	Away team score	Venue	Crowd	Date
North Melbourne	16.12 (108)	Hawthorn	17.9 (111)	MCG	26,456	4 April 1986
Melbourne	21.10 (136)	St Kilda	16.12 (108)	MCG	20,801	5 April 1986
Essendon	21.22 (148)	Geelong	7.9 (51)	Windy Hill	19,377	5 April 1986
Carlton	18.17 (125)	Richmond	15.5 (95)	Princes Park	20,528	5 April 1986
Fitzroy	10.19 (79)	Footscray	10.9 (69)	VFL Park	20,439	5 April 1986
Sydney	19.20 (134)	Collingwood	15.10 (100)	SCG	20,243	6 April 1986

=== Round 3 ===
Home team	Home team score	Away team	Away team score	Venue	Crowd	Date
Hawthorn	22.22 (154)	Richmond	15.9 (99)	Princes Park	11,274	12 April 1986
Geelong	15.15 (105)	Sydney	19.18 (132)	Kardinia Park	16,882	12 April 1986
Fitzroy	14.20 (104)	Melbourne	13.10 (88)	Victoria Park	12,599	12 April 1986
North Melbourne	17.10 (112)	Collingwood	9.15 (69)	MCG	29,842	12 April 1986
St Kilda	10.9 (69)	Carlton	24.13 (157)	Moorabbin Oval	19,410	12 April 1986
Footscray	11.15 (81)	Essendon	13.11 (89)	VFL Park	33,546	12 April 1986

=== Round 4 ===
Home team	Home team score	Away team	Away team score	Venue	Crowd	Date
Essendon	27.8 (170)	Melbourne	17.6 (108)	Windy Hill	18,265	19 April 1986
Collingwood	20.16 (136)	Geelong	13.13 (91)	Victoria Park	19,826	19 April 1986
Carlton	22.24 (156)	Fitzroy	10.15 (75)	Princes Park	27,620	19 April 1986
St Kilda	17.14 (116)	Hawthorn	19.14 (128)	Moorabbin Oval	11,670	19 April 1986
Richmond	17.11 (113)	North Melbourne	14.12 (96)	VFL Park	17,223	19 April 1986
Sydney	20.22 (142)	Footscray	9.12 (66)	SCG	18,766	20 April 1986

=== Round 5 ===
Home team	Home team score	Away team	Away team score	Venue	Crowd	Date
Melbourne	14.17 (101)	Sydney	16.14 (110)	MCG	40,117	25 April 1986
North Melbourne	24.10 (154)	Geelong	14.8 (92)	MCG	40,117	25 April 1986
Carlton	10.11 (71)	Essendon	8.7 (55)	VFL Park	68,151	25 April 1986
Richmond	20.15 (135)	St Kilda	11.18 (84)	MCG	21,611	26 April 1986
Fitzroy	13.26 (104)	Hawthorn	13.12 (90)	Victoria Park	13,311	26 April 1986
Footscray	10.20 (80)	Collingwood	10.13 (73)	Western Oval	23,683	26 April 1986

=== Round 6 ===
Home team	Home team score	Away team	Away team score	Venue	Crowd	Date
North Melbourne	19.25 (139)	St Kilda	15.13 (103)	MCG	13,522	2 May 1986
Geelong	16.14 (110)	Footscray	13.13 (91)	Kardinia Park	15,411	3 May 1986
Melbourne	11.17 (83)	Collingwood	17.19 (121)	MCG	32,472	3 May 1986
Richmond	17.20 (122)	Fitzroy	18.13 (121)	Princes Park	12,877	3 May 1986
Hawthorn	19.12 (126)	Essendon	15.12 (102)	VFL Park	38,381	3 May 1986
Sydney	18.12 (120)	Carlton	13.20 (98)	SCG	37,873	4 May 1986

=== Round 7 ===
Home team	Home team score	Away team	Away team score	Venue	Crowd	Date
Hawthorn	18.25 (133)	Sydney	15.10 (100)	Princes Park	17,731	10 May 1986
Footscray	14.11 (95)	North Melbourne	10.17 (77)	Western Oval	18,196	10 May 1986
St Kilda	10.14 (74)	Fitzroy	12.15 (87)	Moorabbin Oval	11,296	10 May 1986
Richmond	16.9 (105)	Essendon	21.19 (145)	MCG	38,456	10 May 1986
Collingwood	9.15 (69)	Carlton	16.13 (109)	Victoria Park	28,569	10 May 1986
Geelong	12.17 (89)	Melbourne	7.16 (58)	VFL Park	14,504	10 May 1986

=== Round 8 ===
Home team	Home team score	Away team	Away team score	Venue	Crowd	Date
Fitzroy	14.13 (97)	North Melbourne	18.12 (120)	Victoria Park	12,189	17 May 1986
Essendon	22.14 (146)	St Kilda	12.12 (84)	Windy Hill	14,549	17 May 1986
Carlton	20.14 (134)	Geelong	16.9 (105)	Princes Park	21,628	17 May 1986
Melbourne	20.12 (132)	Footscray	11.14 (80)	MCG	18,196	17 May 1986
Collingwood	8.11 (59)	Hawthorn	15.14 (104)	VFL Park	26,032	17 May 1986
Sydney	16.15 (111)	Richmond	16.16 (112)	SCG	25,103	18 May 1986

=== Round 9 ===
Home team	Home team score	Away team	Away team score	Venue	Crowd	Date
St Kilda	5.8 (38)	Sydney	6.11 (47)	Moorabbin Oval	12,492	24 May 1986
Fitzroy	18.7 (115)	Essendon	10.10 (70)	Victoria Park	14,979	24 May 1986
Richmond	11.10 (76)	Collingwood	16.16 (112)	MCG	41,945	24 May 1986
Footscray	7.8 (50)	Carlton	4.12 (36)	Western Oval	21,478	24 May 1986
North Melbourne	12.11 (83)	Melbourne	6.12 (48)	VFL Park	14,478	24 May 1986
Geelong	12.14 (86)	Hawthorn	19.5 (119)	Kardinia Park	21,375	25 May 1986

=== Round 10 ===
Home team	Home team score	Away team	Away team score	Venue	Crowd	Date
North Melbourne	21.11 (137)	Essendon	18.13 (121)	MCG	40,301	30 May 1986
Geelong	19.12 (126)	Richmond	16.14 (110)	Kardinia Park	12,712	31 May 1986
Hawthorn	11.13 (79)	Footscray	16.12 (108)	Princes Park	15,784	31 May 1986
Melbourne	6.13 (49)	Carlton	25.15 (165)	MCG	27,440	31 May 1986
Collingwood	19.19 (133)	St Kilda	14.7 (91)	VFL Park	24,865	31 May 1986
Sydney	18.18 (126)	Fitzroy	14.17 (101)	SCG	23,091	1 June 1986

=== Round 11 ===
Home team	Home team score	Away team	Away team score	Venue	Crowd	Date
Hawthorn	21.19 (145)	Melbourne	9.6 (60)	Princes Park	10,919	7 June 1986
Collingwood	18.14 (122)	Fitzroy	11.12 (78)	Victoria Park	27,166	7 June 1986
St Kilda	13.10 (88)	Geelong	19.12 (126)	VFL Park	21,805	7 June 1986
Essendon	9.4 (58)	Sydney	10.18 (78)	Windy Hill	27,267	9 June 1986
Carlton	22.10 (142)	North Melbourne	9.10 (64)	Princes Park	31,985	9 June 1986
Richmond	15.7 (97)	Footscray	12.8 (80)	MCG	35,360	9 June 1986

=== Round 12 ===
Home team	Home team score	Away team	Away team score	Venue	Crowd	Date
Sydney	13.13 (91)	North Melbourne	14.11 (95)	SCG	26,581	13 June 1986
Melbourne	17.23 (125)	Richmond	21.8 (134)	MCG	19,032	14 June 1986
Fitzroy	22.13 (145)	Geelong	11.11 (77)	Victoria Park	10,987	14 June 1986
St Kilda	10.15 (75)	Footscray	24.10 (154)	Moorabbin Oval	12,520	14 June 1986
Essendon	13.16 (94)	Collingwood	18.12 (120)	VFL Park	27,611	14 June 1986
Hawthorn	19.19 (133)	Carlton	16.14 (110)	MCG	57,634	15 June 1986

=== Round 13 ===
Home team	Home team score	Away team	Away team score	Venue	Crowd	Date
Hawthorn	21.26 (152)	North Melbourne	13.14 (92)	Princes Park	16,145	21 June 1986
Collingwood	14.11 (95)	Sydney	14.12 (96)	Victoria Park	27,611	21 June 1986
St Kilda	15.11 (101)	Melbourne	7.7 (49)	Moorabbin Oval	11,242	21 June 1986
Footscray	22.11 (143)	Fitzroy	8.7 (55)	Western Oval	16,318	21 June 1986
Geelong	11.11 (77)	Essendon	12.17 (89)	Kardinia Park	17,646	21 June 1986
Richmond	11.7 (73)	Carlton	19.18 (132)	VFL Park	26,231	21 June 1986

=== Round 14 ===
Home team	Home team score	Away team	Away team score	Venue	Crowd	Date
Essendon	8.8 (56)	Footscray	12.13 (85)	Windy Hill	21,382	28 June 1986
Collingwood	17.13 (115)	North Melbourne	9.14 (68)	Victoria Park	21,351	28 June 1986
Carlton	24.19 (163)	St Kilda	11.10 (76)	Princes Park	14,760	28 June 1986
Richmond	11.8 (74)	Hawthorn	26.19 (175)	MCG	20,264	28 June 1986
Melbourne	17.13 (115)	Fitzroy	11.5 (71)	VFL Park	10,049	28 June 1986
Sydney	17.11 (113)	Geelong	13.13 (91)	SCG	22,106	29 June 1986

=== Round 15 ===
Home team	Home team score	Away team	Away team score	Venue	Crowd	Date
North Melbourne	13.8 (86)	Richmond	16.18 (114)	MCG	16,975	4 July 1986
Hawthorn	8.11 (59)	St Kilda	5.8 (38)	Princes Park	6,488	5 July 1986
Footscray	11.4 (70)	Sydney	12.14 (86)	Western Oval	21,863	5 July 1986
Melbourne	8.12 (60)	Essendon	27.20 (182)	MCG	21,560	5 July 1986
Geelong	8.10 (58)	Collingwood	19.15 (129)	Kardinia Park	18,067	5 July 1986
Fitzroy	8.11 (59)	Carlton	7.11 (53)	VFL Park	14,962	5 July 1986

=== Round 16 ===
Home team	Home team score	Away team	Away team score	Venue	Crowd	Date
Geelong	16.16 (112)	St Kilda	13.7 (85)	Kardinia Park	9,480	12 July 1986
North Melbourne	13.14 (92)	Carlton	22.17 (149)	MCG	24,506	12 July 1986
Melbourne	6.14 (50)	Hawthorn	17.15 (117)	VFL Park	10,272	12 July 1986
Sydney	24.18 (162)	Essendon	15.13 (103)	SCG	33,192	13 July 1986
Footscray	17.20 (122)	Richmond	14.11 (95)	Western Oval	19,341	19 July 1986
Fitzroy	12.13 (85)	Collingwood	20.12 (132)	VFL Park	34,488	19 July 1986

=== Round 17 ===
Home team	Home team score	Away team	Away team score	Venue	Crowd	Date
Essendon	15.15 (105)	Carlton	11.14 (80)	MCG	51,646	20 July 1986
St Kilda	20.9 (129)	Richmond	7.12 (54)	Moorabbin Oval	11,889	26 July 1986
Hawthorn	6.9 (45)	Fitzroy	14.12 (96)	Princes Park	9,876	26 July 1986
Geelong	19.9 (123)	North Melbourne	22.10 (142)	VFL Park	10,091	26 July 1986
Collingwood	11.10 (76)	Footscray	9.11 (65)	MCG	49,124	26 July 1986
Sydney	29.15 (189)	Melbourne	9.11 (65)	SCG	19,110	27 July 1986

=== Round 18 ===
Home team	Home team score	Away team	Away team score	Venue	Crowd	Date
Essendon	21.11 (137)	Hawthorn	6.14 (50)	Windy Hill	21,320	2 August 1986
Collingwood	13.14 (92)	Melbourne	16.9 (105)	Victoria Park	10,943	2 August 1986
Carlton	15.14 (104)	Sydney	12.15 (87)	Princes Park	27,644	2 August 1986
St Kilda	13.12 (90)	North Melbourne	19.13 (127)	Moorabbin Oval	11,413	2 August 1986
Richmond	11.19 (85)	Fitzroy	13.16 (94)	MCG	15,200	2 August 1986
Footscray	11.13 (79)	Geelong	10.16 (76)	VFL Park	11,460	2 August 1986

=== Round 19 ===
Home team	Home team score	Away team	Away team score	Venue	Crowd	Date
Fitzroy	24.16 (160)	St Kilda	11.9 (75)	Victoria Park	8,311	9 August 1986
Melbourne	18.19 (127)	Geelong	17.18 (120)	MCG	32,635	9 August 1986
North Melbourne	20.20 (140)	Footscray	10.23 (83)	MCG	32,635	9 August 1986
Essendon	23.16 (154)	Richmond	11.9 (75)	VFL Park	30,349	9 August 1986
Sydney	10.13 (73)	Hawthorn	27.9 (171)	SCG	39,763	10 August 1986
Carlton	21.10 (136)	Collingwood	12.15 (87)	MCG	72,505	10 August 1986

=== Round 20 ===
Home team	Home team score	Away team	Away team score	Venue	Crowd	Date
Richmond	14.12 (96)	Sydney	21.18 (144)	MCG	16,141	16 August 1986
Footscray	19.14 (128)	Melbourne	10.11 (71)	Western Oval	11,924	16 August 1986
St Kilda	6.12 (48)	Essendon	11.16 (82)	Moorabbin Oval	13,171	16 August 1986
Hawthorn	20.24 (144)	Collingwood	10.12 (72)	Princes Park	16,597	16 August 1986
Geelong	16.12 (108)	Carlton	10.19 (79)	Kardinia Park	11,987	16 August 1986
North Melbourne	14.9 (93)	Fitzroy	9.7 (61)	VFL Park	15,931	16 August 1986

=== Round 21 ===
Home team	Home team score	Away team	Away team score	Venue	Crowd	Date
Melbourne	28.14 (182)	North Melbourne	14.13 (97)	MCG	15,110	23 August 1986
Essendon	8.13 (61)	Fitzroy	14.12 (96)	Windy Hill	18,910	23 August 1986
Collingwood	23.18 (156)	Richmond	8.7 (55)	Victoria Park	17,800	23 August 1986
Hawthorn	35.15 (225)	Geelong	13.12 (90)	Princes Park	9,848	23 August 1986
Carlton	23.13 (151)	Footscray	10.12 (72)	VFL Park	28,697	23 August 1986
Sydney	20.20 (140)	St Kilda	16.15 (111)	SCG	18,179	24 August 1986

=== Round 22 ===
Home team	Home team score	Away team	Away team score	Venue	Crowd	Date
Footscray	7.13 (55)	Hawthorn	19.11 (125)	Western Oval	15,196	30 August 1986
Fitzroy	9.19 (73)	Sydney	8.15 (63)	Victoria Park	17,141	30 August 1986
Essendon	10.19 (79)	North Melbourne	15.11 (101)	Windy Hill	17,982	30 August 1986
Carlton	20.19 (139)	Melbourne	6.17 (53)	Princes Park	17,455	30 August 1986
Richmond	15.14 (104)	Geelong	20.16 (136)	MCG	13,569	30 August 1986
St Kilda	11.7 (73)	Collingwood	18.17 (125)	VFL Park	30,442	30 August 1986

== Ladder ==
(P)	Premiers
	Qualified for finals

#	Team	P	W	L	D	PF	PA	%	Pts
1	Hawthorn (P)	22	18	4	0	2698	1906	141.6	72
2	Sydney	22	16	6	0	2470	2087	118.4	64
3	Carlton	22	15	7	0	2566	1809	141.8	60
4	Fitzroy	22	13	9	0	2068	2063	100.2	52
5	Essendon	22	12	10	0	2379	1978	120.3	48
6	Collingwood	22	12	10	0	2261	2070	109.2	48
7	North Melbourne	22	12	10	0	2324	2356	98.6	48
8	Footscray	22	11	11	0	1963	2010	97.7	44
9	Geelong	22	7	15	0	2133	2599	82.1	28
10	Richmond	22	7	15	0	2151	2745	78.4	28
11	Melbourne	22	7	15	0	2003	2673	74.9	28
12	St Kilda	22	2	20	0	1846	2566	71.9	8

Rules for classification: 1. premiership points; 2. percentage; 3. points for
Average score: 101.8
Source: AFL Tables

== Finals series ==
=== Finals week 1 ===
Home team	Score	Away team	Score	Venue	Attendance	Date
Fitzroy	8.10 (58)	Essendon	8.9 (57)	Waverley Park	59,420	Saturday, 6 September
Sydney	15.14 (104)	Carlton	18.12 (120)	MCG	66,016	Sunday, 7 September

=== Finals week 2 ===
Home team	Score	Away team	Score	Venue	Attendance	Date
Hawthorn	13.6 (84)	Carlton	16.16 (112)	Waverley Park	62,315	Saturday, 13 September
Sydney	13.11 (89)	Fitzroy	13.16 (94)	MCG	65,763	Sunday, 14 September

=== Preliminary final ===
Home team	Score	Away team	Score	Venue	Attendance	Date
Hawthorn	16.14 (110)	Fitzroy	7.12 (54)	Waverley Park	68,339	Saturday, 20 September

=== Grand final ===
Home team	Score	Away team	Score	Venue	Attendance	Date
Carlton	9.14 (68)	Hawthorn	16.14 (110)	MCG	101,861	Saturday, 27 September

== Season notes ==
- For the first time in VFL/AFL history, two senior games were held at the same venue on the same day with Melbourne hosting Sydney, followed by North Melbourne vs Geelong at the MCG in round 5. Another double header was staged in round 19 at the MCG with Melbourne and North Melbourne again the home teams against Geelong and Footscray respectively. It would be 34 years before this occurred again.
- In Round 21, Hawthorn led Geelong by only three points at half-time, but then kicked 25.7 (157) to 3.7 (25) in the second half. Hawthorn's final score of 35.15 (225) set a new record as the club's highest score (since surpassed in 1991) and Geelong's highest score conceded (still a record as of 2021), and the margin of 135 points set and holds the record for Geelong's highest losing margin. Hawthorn's 25.7 (157) set and holds the record for highest score by a single team in a half of football.
- Round 22 was the last round in VFL/AFL history in which all matches were played on the same day.
- Fitzroy endured serious financial hardships during 1986 which threatened its existence. More than one million dollars in debt, and having posted a $600,000 loss in 1985, the club took a $500,000 loan from the VFL in January 1986, and needed another $500,000 by the end of the year to remain solvent. It fielded offers from two Brisbane-based companies and one Canberra-based company for the club to move north in 1987, and it discussed mergers with Melbourne, St Kilda and Richmond. Despite the off-field struggles, the club reached the preliminary final; it was the last time the club played finals before its merger with Brisbane at the end of 1996.

== Awards ==
- The Brownlow Medal was awarded to both Greg Williams of the Sydney Swans and Robert "Dipper" DiPierdomenico of the Hawthorn Hawks
- The Leigh Matthews Trophy was awarded to Paul Roos of Fitzroy.
- The Coleman Medal was awarded to Brian Taylor of Collingwood.
- The Norm Smith Medal was awarded to Gary Ayres of Hawthorn.
- The wooden spoon was "awarded" to St Kilda.
- Carlton won the reserves premiership. Carlton 22.14 (146) defeated Footscray 10.12 (72) in the grand final, held as a curtain-raiser to the seniors Grand Final on 27 September at the Melbourne Cricket Ground.

== Sources ==
- 1986 VFL season at AFL Tables
- 1986 VFL season at Australian Football
