= Allan Jeans =

Australian rules footballer, born 1933

Personal information
- Full name: Allan Lindsay Jeans
- Born: 21 September 1933; Finley, New South Wales
- Died: 12 July 2011 (aged 77); Lynbrook, Victoria
- Original team: Tocumwal / Finley
- Height: 180 cm (5 ft 11 in)
- Weight: 83 kg (183 lb)

Playing career^{1}
Years	Club	Games (Goals)
1955–1959	St Kilda	77 (26)

Coaching career^{3}
Years	Club	Games (W–L–D)
1961–1976	St Kilda	332 (193–138–1)
1981–1987 1989–1990	Hawthorn	221 (159–61–1)
1992	Richmond	22 (5–17–0)
Total		575 (357–216–2)
- ^{1} Playing statistics correct to the end of 1959.^{3} Coaching statistics correct as of 1992.

Career highlights
- Coaching: 4× VFL premiership coach: 1966, 1983, 1986, 1989; Australian Football Hall of Fame (inaugural inductee); St Kilda Team of the Century; AFLCA Coaching Legend Award: 2015; (coach)

Allan Lindsay Jeans (21 September 1933 – 13 July 2011) was an Australian rules footballer and coach. He was inducted into the Australian Football Hall of Fame at its inception in 1996. Jeans was known for his oratory and motivation skills as a coach and led St Kilda and Hawthorn to a total of four premierships.

== VFL career ==
Allan Jeans was recruited to St Kilda after playing in Finley Football Club's 1954 Murray Football League (MFL) senior premiership, and he was also runner-up in the 1954 MFL O’Dwyer Medal.

After a modest 77-game playing career with the St Kilda Football Club (1955–1959), Jeans, known as "Yabby", took the reins of the Saints in 1961 for a remarkable 16-year career as senior coach. He coached St Kilda to successive grand finals, in 1965 and 1966, including the Saints' first (and only) VFL premiership in 1966. He took the Saints to another grand final appearance in 1971. Claiming "burn-out", he retired from coaching the team at the end of 1976.

In 1981, Jeans revived his coaching career when he was appointed coach for the Hawthorn Football Club. He coached them until 1990 (excluding a year off in 1988 due to brain injury) establishing them as the dominant VFL team of the 1980s, with premierships in 1983, 1986 and 1989 from seven consecutive grand finals.

Finally, he had a short-lived one-year stint at Richmond in 1992, winning only five out of 22 games.

== Later life ==
Jeans supported the planned merger between Hawthorn and Melbourne in 1996.

Following his retirement from his job as a Senior Sergeant with Victoria Police, Jeans became an avid social lawn bowls player at Cheltenham Lawn Bowls Club. One of his last public appearances was at the post-match presentations of the 2006 AFL Grand Final. He died following years of ill health on 12 July 2011.
