= List of VFL debuts in 1989 =

The 1989 VFL season was the 93rd season of the Victorian Football League (VFL). The season saw 84 Australian rules footballers make their senior VFL debut and a further 25 players transfer to new clubs, having previously played in the VFL.

== Summary ==
Summary of debuts in 1989
Club	VFL debuts	Change of club
Brisbane Bears	6	3
Carlton	8	2
Collingwood	7	1
Essendon	6	1
Fitzroy	7	3
Footscray	4	3
Geelong	4	2
Hawthorn	3	0
Melbourne	5	2
North Melbourne	9	0
Richmond	7	0
St Kilda	4	4
Sydney	4	2
West Coast	10	2
Total	84	25

== Debuts ==
Name	Club	Age at debut	Round debuted	Games	Goals	Notes
Marcus Ashcroft	Brisbane Bears	17 years, 243 days	9	318	145	
John Gastev	Brisbane Bears	24 years, 233 days	1	113	41	Previously played for West Coast.
Martin Leslie	Brisbane Bears	26 years, 135 days	1	107	11	
David Bain	Brisbane Bears	22 years, 334 days	1	86	44	
Mark Zanotti	Brisbane Bears	24 years, 199 days	9	64	5	Previously played for West Coast.
Alex Ishchenko	Brisbane Bears	26 years, 362 days	1	42	15	Previously played for West Coast.
Lachlan Sim	Brisbane Bears	19 years, 136 days	2	21	5	
Chris O'Sullivan	Brisbane Bears	21 years, 34 days	9	8	2	
Simon Hose	Brisbane Bears	21 years, 361 days	2	5	2	
Fraser Brown	Carlton	18 years, 226 days	1	177	91	Son of Joyce Brown and grandson of Doug Anderson.
Andrew Phillips	Carlton	19 years, 92 days	5	42	26	Uncle of Tom and Ed Phillips.
Simon Verbeek	Carlton	22 years, 3 days	1	38	33	
Glenn Hawker	Carlton	28 years, 15 days	1	27	26	Previously played for Essendon.
Simon Minton-Connell	Carlton	20 years, 80 days	15	19	50	Nephew of Peter Hudson and cousin of Paul Hudson.
Dominic Fotia	Carlton	19 years, 148 days	6	18	4	
Andrew McKinnon	Carlton	20 years, 247 days	1	15	7	
Ashley Matthews	Carlton	19 years, 252 days	18	9	3	
Paul Payne	Carlton	24 years, 41 days	3	5	0	Previously played for Melbourne.
Peter White	Carlton	18 years, 313 days	8	3	1	
Craig Kelly	Collingwood	22 years, 310 days	4	122	43	Grandson of Bert Kelly.
Colin Alexander	Collingwood	18 years, 354 days	1	24	28	
Heath Shephard	Collingwood	19 years, 220 days	3	11	16	Son of Graeme Shephard.
Murray Wrensted	Collingwood	24 years, 247 days	5	10	4	Previously played for West Coast.
Brendan Tranter	Collingwood	18 years, 114 days	19	8	0	
Terry Hecker	Collingwood	19 years, 239 days	22	6	1	
Mark Bayliss	Collingwood	23 years, 152 days	7	4	6	
Simon Taylor	Collingwood	18 years, 256 days	21	2	1	
Michael Long	Essendon	19 years, 181 days	1	190	143	
David Grenvold	Essendon	23 years, 25 days	1	112	18	
Kieran Sporn	Essendon	22 years, 215 days	1	72	65	Brother of Rachael Sporn.
Michael Werner	Essendon	19 years, 331 days	6	40	60	
Andrew Manning	Essendon	22 years, 256 days	18	25	20	Previously played for St Kilda.
Craig O'Brien	Essendon	19 years, 175 days	21	21	16	
Andrew Underwood	Essendon	21 years, 260 days	1	12	4	
Jason Baldwin	Fitzroy	19 years, 215 days	11	125	36	
Darren Wheildon	Fitzroy	18 years, 197 days	9	70	160	
Brendan McCormack	Fitzroy	18 years, 277 days	1	44	27	
Wally Matera	Fitzroy	22 years, 125 days	1	32	39	Brother of Peter and Phillip Matera and father of Brandon Matera. Previously played for West Coast.
Carl Dilena	Fitzroy	22 years, 15 days	1	23	15	
Peter Bourke	Fitzroy	22 years, 355 days	7	22	3	Previously played for Essendon.
Tony Woods	Fitzroy	19 years, 287 days	3	13	4	
Kevin Caton	Fitzroy	23 years, 333 days	2	9	8	Previously played for West Coast.
Brad Edwards	Fitzroy	21 years, 38 days	1	6	1	
Dean Lupson	Fitzroy	20 years, 175 days	19	6	0	
Nigel Kellett	Footscray	19 years, 224 days	17	101	41	
Justin Charles	Footscray	19 years, 332 days	21	36	24	Son of John R. Charles and nephew of Norm Charles.
Tim Harrington	Footscray	25 years, 216 days	4	18	0	Previously played for North Melbourne and Collingwood.
John Georgiades	Footscray	23 years, 88 days	1	15	27	Father of Mitch Georgiades.
Mark Williams	Footscray	22 years, 240 days	1	14	13	Son of John Williams. Previously played for Carlton.
Phillip O'Keeffe	Footscray	22 years, 105 days	1	9	19	
Tony Evans	Footscray	23 years, 83 days	4	3	1	Previously played for St Kilda.
Ken Hinkley	Geelong	22 years, 184 days	1	121	58	Cousin of Gary Rohan. Previously played for Fitzroy.
Andrew Rogers	Geelong	24 years, 264 days	6	75	2	Previously played for Essendon.
Spiro Malakellis	Geelong	21 years, 120 days	7	67	18	Brother of Tony Malakellis.
Adrian Fletcher	Geelong	18 years, 289 days	8	23	10	
Ray Sterrett	Geelong	24 years, 16 days	2	20	7	
Tim Bourke	Geelong	19 years, 353 days	1	5	0	Brother of Damian Bourke and uncle of Jordan Bourke.
Greg Madigan	Hawthorn	19 years, 139 days	11	40	4	
Lawrence Bingham	Hawthorn	19 years, 308 days	1	3	0	
Matthew Bourke	Hawthorn	20 years, 268 days	10	1	0	
Darren Bennett	Melbourne	24 years, 96 days	3	74	208	Previously played for West Coast.
Luke Beveridge	Melbourne	18 years, 263 days	7	42	41	2016 AFL Premiership coach. Grandson of Jack Beveridge.
John Howat	Melbourne	18 years, 317 days	9	20	10	
Dannie Seow	Melbourne	21 years, 317 days	1	7	2	Previously played for Collingwood.
John Ahern	Melbourne	18 years, 203 days	1	2	0	
Tom Kavanagh	Melbourne	19 years, 22 days	7	2	1	Son of Brent Crosswell.
Anthony Stevens	North Melbourne	18 years, 41 days	19	292	127	
Wayne Carey	North Melbourne	18 years, 14 days	11	244	671	
Liam Pickering	North Melbourne	20 years, 309 days	15	22	8	Son of Michael Pickering.
Warwick Angus	North Melbourne	19 years, 275 days	3	13	3	
Derek Kickett	North Melbourne	26 years, 213 days	6	12	12	Uncle of Lance Franklin, Jarrod Garlett, Dale Kickett and Byron Pickett. Cousin of Nicky Winmar.
Leigh Tudor	North Melbourne	19 years, 272 days	13	8	6	
Andrew Krakouer	North Melbourne	18 years, 20 days	17	8	8	Brother of Jim and Phil Krakouer and uncle of Andrew Krakouer.
Tim McGrath	North Melbourne	18 years, 231 days	9	7	0	
Steven Venner	North Melbourne	19 years, 209 days	1	4	0	
Barry Young	Richmond	18 years, 303 days	4	53	23	
Stuart Griffiths	Richmond	20 years, 67 days	2	17	14	
Cory Young	Richmond	18 years, 166 days	20	6	1	
Mark Stockdale	Richmond	20 years, 284 days	18	6	2	
Richard Lounder	Richmond	22 years, 100 days	5	4	5	
Mark McLeod	Richmond	20 years, 165 days	11	3	0	
Brett Mahony	Richmond	19 years, 60 days	10	2	0	
Craig Devonport	St Kilda	19 years, 92 days	5	94	80	
Lazar Vidovic	St Kilda	24 years, 105 days	15	80	13	
Paul Harding	St Kilda	24 years, 301 days	1	62	7	Previously played for Hawthorn.
Danny Craven	St Kilda	21 years, 333 days	1	33	10	
Peter Russo	St Kilda	29 years, 168 days	3	33	20	Previously played for Hawthorn.
Ian Dargie	St Kilda	25 years, 249 days	16	10	1	
Brian Winton	St Kilda	25 years, 359 days	16	5	4	Previously played for Richmond and Essendon.
Robert Handley	St Kilda	24 years, 118 days	6	4	2	Previously played for Hawthorn.
Sanford Wheeler	Sydney Swans	19 years, 30 days	6	43	7	
Robert Teal	Sydney Swans	21 years, 356 days	3	18	18	
Glenn Page	Sydney Swans	19 years, 161 days	22	18	3	
Tim Barling	Sydney Swans	24 years, 39 days	17	13	2	Previously played for Richmond.
Darren Ogier	Sydney Swans	26 years, 115 days	9	8	16	Previously played for Carlton and North Melbourne.
Paul Holdsworth	Sydney Swans	19 years, 58 days	3	6	3	
Peter Sumich	West Coast	21 years, 79 days	1	150	514	
Don Pyke	West Coast	20 years, 116 days	1	132	70	Son of Frank Pyke and brother of James Pyke.
Craig Turley	West Coast	23 years, 219 days	1	115	91	
Scott Watters	West Coast	20 years, 100 days	6	46	13	
Stevan Jackson	West Coast	19 years, 52 days	5	38	68	
Todd Breman	West Coast	23 years, 154 days	1	23	15	Played first-class cricket for Western Australia.
Shane Ellis	West Coast	28 years, 185 days	1	10	8	
Peter Melesso	West Coast	27 years, 137 days	3	6	4	Previously played for South Melbourne and St Kilda.
Clinton Browning	West Coast	27 years, 47 days	4	4	5	
Peter Higgins	West Coast	22 years, 243 days	11	4	0	
Richard Geary	West Coast	25 years, 211 days	4	2	0	Previously played for Richmond.
Shane Cable	West Coast	19 years, 115 days	12	1	0	Son of Barry Cable.
