= West Coast Eagles draft history =

The West Coast Eagles have drafted players through the Australian Football League's draft system, beginning with the 1988 VFL draft. The West Coast Eagles have participated in every national draft since then, and also participated in the pre-season draft (first held in 1989), the mid-season draft (held from 1990–1993), and the rookie draft (first held in 1997). So far, the West Coast Eagles have drafted over 200 players through the draft system, with another 30 or so being recruited via the VFL's old zone recruitment system prior to 1993.

== 1987 pre-season ==
West Coast Eagles inaugural squad
Senior list			Coaching staff
1 Wally Matera; 2 Robert Wiley; 3 Chris Mainwaring; 4 Ross Glendinning (c); 5 Dwayne Lamb; 6 Geoff Miles; 7 Phil Narkle; 8 Steve Malaxos; 9 Glenn O'Loughlin; 10 Dean Turner; 11 Peter Davidson; 12 Phil Scott; 14 Michael Brennan	15 Dean Laidley; 16 John Annear; 18 Andrew Macnish; 19 Darren Bennett; 20 Paul Peos; 21 David O'Connell; 22 Michael O'Connell; 23 Glen Bartlett; 24 John Worsfold; 25 Laurie Keene; 26 Alex Ishchenko; 27 Mark Zanotti	28 Chris Lewis; 30 John Gastev; 32 Murray Wrensted; 33 Don Holmes; 34 Sean King; 35 Dean Warwick; 36 David Hart; 37 Paul Mifka; 38 Adrian Barich; 45 Andrew Lockyer	Head coach: Ron Alexander; Assistant coach: Barry Cable (senior assistant); Legend: (c) Captain(s); (vc) Vice-captain(s); Long-term injury list; Upgraded rookie; Updated: 28 June 2011; Source(s): Eagles Flying High

== 1988 pre-season ==
Recruitment

1: Murray Rance
2: Kevin Caton
3: Joe Cormack
4: Shane Ellis
5: Richard Geary
6: Peter Higgins
7: Brent Hutton
8: Don Langsford
9: Troy Ugle
10: Clinton Browning
11: Guy McKenna

== 1989 pre-season ==
Pre-draft selections

1: Stevan Jackson
2: Don Pyke
3: Peter Sumich
4: Craig Turley
5: Scott Watters

1988 national draft

2: Todd Breman
10: Peter Higgins (re-drafted)
24: David Hynes
38: Jeremy Crough
44: Scott Williamson
52: Darren Bartsch
66: Matt Richardson
80: Damian Berto
94: Andrew Geddes
108: Peter Melesso

1989 pre-season draft

10: Shane Cable
24: Clinton Browning
38: Shane Ellis
52: Richard Geary

== 1990 pre-season ==
Pre-draft selections

1: Ryan Turnbull
2: Peter Mann

1989 national draft

4: Peter Matera
50: Tony Evans
78: Stephen Schwerdt
92: Brett Heady
112: Ashley McIntosh (F/S)
Addit. selection: Dean Kemp
Addit. selection: Tony Begovich
Addit. selection: Brad Gwilliam

1990 pre-season draft

4: Craig McGrath
10: Phil Narkle
24: Warren Dean
38: Bret Hutchinson

1990 mid-season draft

10: Craig McNaughton

== 1991 pre-season ==
Pre-draft selections

1: Mitchell White
2: Glen Jakovich

1990 national draft

9: Matt Clape
12: Shane Porter
20: Robbie West
36: Matthew Burton
64: Derek Hall
69: Gavan Cooney
83: Mark Williams

1991 pre-season draft

18: Cory Young
35: Craig McNaughton (re-drafted)
49: Brad Edwards
57: Peter Higgins (re-drafted)

== 1992 pre-season ==
Pre-draft selections

1: Jason Ball

1991 national draft

16: Daniel Metropolis
24: Kane Morphett
25: Steven Davies
29: Matthew Connell
42: Peter Freeman
74: Brendan Krummel

1992 pre-season draft

13: Tim Watson
27: David Ogg
41: Jason Disney

1992 mid-season draft

13: Damian Hampson

== 1993 pre-season ==
1992 national draft

1: Drew Banfield
8: Paul Symmons
19: Lee Walker
21: Shane Bond
34: Travis Burton
49: Jarrad Schofield
64: Tony Godden
79: Brett Spinks
94: Rhys Croxford
109: David Muir
124: Brayden Lyle

1993 pre-season draft

19: Brendon Retzlaff
35: Travis Edmonds
49: Brendan Green

== 1994 pre-season ==
1993 national draft

16: Fraser Gehrig
33: Ben Robbins
43: Jason Heatley

1994 pre-season draft

17: Scott Thomson

== 1995 pre-season ==
1994 national draft

12: Shane Sikora
37: Ashley Blurton
44: Jeremy Dyer
54: Ian Downsborough
55: Chad Morrison (compensation pick)
71: Jason Spinks

1995 pre-season draft

17: Paul Peos

== 1996 pre-season ==
1995 national draft

3: Brendon Fewster
14: Luke Trew
30: Craig Smoker
44: Jonson Clifton
57: Paul Whitelaw
66: Neil Marshall
F/S: Ben Cousins

1996 pre-season draft

13: Andrew Donnelly

Pre-draft compensation selection

David Wirrpanda

== 1997 pre-season ==
1996 national draft

1: Michael Gardiner
24: Josh Wooden
39: Nick Stone
53: Michael Braun
57: Trent Cummings

1997 rookie draft

12: Paul Blair
28: Todd Nener
44: Trent Simpson
60: Mark Webb

== 1998 pre-season ==
1997 national draft

12: Jaxon Crabb
13: Callum Chambers
28: Rowan Jones
34: Andrew Williams
37: Todd Holmes
44: David Antonowicz
60: Phil Read

1998 rookie draft

11: Conrad Chambers
26: Chad Fletcher
43: Laurie Bellotti
59: Heath Younie
75: Todd Nener (re-drafted)
91: Trent Simpson (re-drafted)

== 1999 pre-season ==
1998 national draft

10: Brandon Hill
26: Michael O'Brien
57: Andrew Embley
69: Scott Bennett
89: Joel Duckworth

1999 rookie draft

12: Simon Duckworth
28: Mark Pearson
44: Andrew Taylor

== 2000 pre-season ==
1999 national draft

11: Darren Glass
14: Travis Gaspar
16: David Haynes
29: Adam Hunter
41: Kane Munro

2000 rookie draft

12: Toby McGrath
28: Dean Cox
44: Kasey Green

== 2001 pre-season ==
2000 national draft

5: Andrew McDougall
18: Daniel Kerr
36: Jeremy Humm
45: Trent Carroll

2001 pre-season draft

3: Troy Wilson

2001 rookie draft

4: Dean Buszan
20: Zach Beeck
35: Andrew McCarrey
48: Kris Miller

== 2002 pre-season ==
2001 national draft

3: Chris Judd(Priority selection)
6: Ashley Sampi
22: Mark Seaby
38: Ashley Hansen

2002 rookie draft

3: Brent Tuckey
19: Quinten Lynch
34: Clancy Rudeforth

== 2003 pre-season ==
2002 national draft

24: Paul Johnson
37: Brent Staker
53: Adam Selwood

2003 rookie draft

9: Aaron Edwards
25: Mark Nicoski
41: Zach Beeck (re-drafted)

== 2004 pre-season ==
2003 national draft

11: Beau Waters
20: Sam Butler
26: Daniel McConnell

2004 rookie draft

9: Brett Jones
25: Michael Embley
40: Jaymie Graham
54: Clancy Rudeforth (re-drafted)

== 2005 pre-season ==
2004 national draft

29: Matthew Rosa
37: Mark LeCras
44: Mitch Morton (F/S)
57: Brad Smith

2005 rookie draft

9: Benjamin Sharp
25: Beau Wilkes
40: Ashley Thornton
52: Aaron Edwards (re-drafted)

== 2006 pre-season ==
2005 national draft

13: Shannon Hurn
29: Ben McKinley
34: Matt Spangher

2006 rookie draft

15: Steven Armstrong
31: Matthew Priddis
44: Michael Embley (re-drafted)

== 2007 pre-season ==
2006 national draft

16: Mitch Brown
29: Eric Mackenzie
43: Tim Houlihan
50: Will Schofield
80: James Thomson

2007 rookie draft

16: Jamie McNamara
31: Llane Spaanderman
45: Chad Jones
56: Ben Sharp (re-drafted)
60: Ashley Thornton (re-drafted)
65: Beau Wilkes (re-drafted)

== 2008 pre-season ==
2007 national draft

3: Chris Masten
13: Brad Ebert
20: Tony Notte
22: Scott Selwood

2008 pre-season draft

7: Patrick McGinnity

2008 rookie draft

12: Lewis Stevenson
28: Ashley Arrowsmith
43: Will Sullivan
55: Callum Wilson
59: Beau Wilkes (re-drafted)
28: Ryan Davis (NSW Scholarship)

== 2009 pre-season ==
2008 national draft

2: Nic Naitanui
18: Luke Shuey (Priority selection)
20: Tom Swift
36: Ashley Smith
52: Jordan Jones

2009 rookie draft

2: Liam Bedford
18: Adam Cockie

== 2010 pre-season ==
2009 national draft

7: Brad Sheppard
22: Gerrick Weedon
23: Koby Stevens

2010 pre-season draft

5: Ryan Neates

2010 rookie draft

11: Lewis Broome
27: Andrew Strijk
40: Ashton Hams
53: Jarrad Oakley-Nicholls

== 2011 pre-season ==
2010 national draft

4: Andrew Gaff
26: Jack Darling
28: Scott Lycett
62: Jacob Brennan (F/S)

2011 pre-season draft

2: Blayne Wilson

2011 rookie draft

10: Tim Houlihan (re-drafted)
27: Anton Hamp
44: Jeremy McGovern

== 2012 pre-season ==
2011 national draft

23: Murray Newman
28: Fraser McInnes
63: Ashton Hams (rookie elevation)

== List of players who were traded to the club ==
1989

1: Peter Wilson traded by Richmond for draft selections 18 and 32

1990

1: Ian Dargie traded by St Kilda for draft selection 92
2: Dale Kickett traded by Richmond for draft selection 78
3: Mark Hepburn traded by North Melbourne for draft selection 50

1991

1: Paul Gow traded by Footscray for draft selection 38
2: Paul Harding traded by St Kilda for draft selection 12
3: Trent Nichols Richmond traded for draft selection 51
4: David Regan traded by Essendon for draft selection 63

1994

1: Michael Dunstan traded by Fitzroy for draft selection 19

1995

1: Phillip Matera traded by Fremantle for David Hynes
2: Andy Lovell traded by Melbourne for Craig Turley

1996

1: Ilija Grgic traded by Footscray for Luke Trew and draft selection 20

1997

1: Scott Cummings traded by Port Adelaide for Jarrad Schofield
2: Chad Rintoul traded by Adelaide for draft selection 80

2000

1: Michael Collica and Richard Taylor traded by Hawthorn for draft selection 21
2: Greg Harding traded by Fremantle for Daniel Metropolis and draft selection 51
3: Mark Merenda traded by Richmond for draft selection 57
4: Michael Prior traded by Essendon for draft selection 27
5: David Sierakowski traded by St Kilda for Fraser Gehrig

2002

1: Damien Adkins traded by Collingwood for Andrew Williams
2: Daniel Chick traded by Hawthorn for draft selection 8

2004

1: Tyson Stenglein traded by Adelaide for draft selections 12 and 28

2007

1: Josh Kennedy and draft selections 3 and 20 traded by Carlton for Chris Judd and draft selection 46

2009

1: Bradd Dalziell traded by the Brisbane Lions for Brent Staker

2011

1: Josh Hill traded by the Western Bulldogs for draft selection 49

2012

1: Sharrod Wellingham traded by Collingwood for draft selection 18

2 Jamie Cripps and draft selection 45 traded by St Kilda for draft selections 40 and 43

2013

1: Elliot Yeo traded by Brisbane Lionsfor draft selection 28Melbourne

Jayden Hunt traded as a free agent to West Coast from Melbourne

== See also ==
- List of West Coast Eagles players
