= 1989 West Coast Eagles season =

West Coast Eagles
1989 season
- President: Neil Hamilton
- Coach: John Todd
- Captain(s): Murray Rance
- Home ground: Subiaco Oval; WACA Ground
- Panasonic Cup: Semi-finals
- VFL season: 11th
- Finals series: N/A
- Best & Fairest: Guy McKenna
- Leading goalkicker: Peter Sumich (90 goals)
- Highest home attendance: 25,664, against Essendon, rd. 1
- Lowest home attendance: 13,118, against Sydney, rd. 16
- Average home attendance: 18,691

The 1989 season was the West Coast Eagles' 3rd season in the Victorian Football League (VFL). The Eagles finished 11th out of 14 teams, the poorest performance of the club's three seasons to date.

== List ==
=== Player changes ===
In	From	Out	To
Stevan Jackson	South Fremantle	Ross Glendinning	retired
Don Pyke	Claremont	Michael O'Connell	de-listed
Peter Sumich	South Fremantle	Peter Higgins	de-listed
Craig Turley	West Perth	Wally Matera	Fitzroy
Scott Watters	South Fremantle	Murray Wrensted	Collingwood
Todd Breman	Subiaco	John Gastev	Brisbane Bears
Peter Higgins	West Coast Eagles (Note: Higgins was de-listed at the end of the 1988 season, but was re-drafted by the Eagles with pick #10 in the 1988 VFL Draft.)	Alex Ishchenko	Brisbane Bears
David Hynes	Port Adelaide	Kevin Caton	Fitzroy
Jeremy Crough	South Bendigo	Mark Zanotti	Brisbane Bears
Scott Williamson	Wangaratta		
Darren Bartsch	West Adelaide (Note: Bartsch was drafted by West Coast, but decided to remain in Adelaide, never joining the club.)		
Matt Richardson	Warracknabeal		
Damian Berto	St Mary's (Note: Berto was drafted by West Coast, but decided to remain in the Northern Territory, never joining the club.)		
Andrew Geddes	Katunga		
Peter Melesso	Claremont		

== Pre-season ==
=== Trades ===
West Coast traded Alex Ishchenko and Mark Zanotti to the Brisbane Bears for selections 2 and 44 in the 1988 VFL Draft.

=== Draft selections ===
Pre-draft selections

1: Stevan Jackson
2: Don Pyke
3: Peter Sumich
4: Craig Turley
5: Scott Watters

1988 National draft

2: Todd Breman
10: Peter Higgins (re-drafted)
24: David Hynes
38: Jeremy Crough
44: Scott Williamson
52: Darren Bartsch
66: Matt Richardson
80: Damian Berto
94: Andrew Geddes
108: Peter Melesso

1989 pre-season draft

10: Shane Cable
24: Clinton Browning
38: Shane Ellis
52: Richard Geary

=== Panasonic Cup ===
The 1989 Panasonic Cup was played in a knock-out format. Matches were played during the months of February and March, before the regular season started. All matches were held at Waverley Park, in Mulgrave, Victoria. West Coast progressed to the semi-finals of the competition before being eliminated by Melbourne, who went on to win the tournament.

Round	Date	Score	Opponent	Opponent's Score	Result	Venue	Attendance
1	Wednesday, 8 February	14.10 (94)	St Kilda	10.8 (68)	Won by 26 points	Waverley Park	10,085
QF	Saturday, 25 February	14.5 (89)	Hawthorn	13.10 (88)	Won by 1 point	Waverley Park	9,605
SF	Wednesday, 8 March	7.13 (55)	Melbourne	6.18 (54)	Lost by 1 point	Waverley Park	7,185

== Regular season ==
Home team's score listed in bold
Best on ground refers to the player who was awarded three votes in the Brownlow Medal

Round	Date	Score	Opponent	Opponent's score	Result	Venue	Attendance	Best on ground	Team
1	Friday, 31 March 7:40pm	**14.12 (96)**	Essendon	17.10 (112)	Lost by 16 points	WACA Ground	25,664	Greg Anderson	Essendon
2	Sunday, 9 April 2:10pm	11.14 (80)	Geelong	**26.19 (175)**	Lost by 95 points	Kardinia Park	19,939	Paul Couch	Geelong
3	Sunday, 16 April 2:10pm	11.17 (83)	Sydney	**20.14 (134)**	Lost by 95 points	SCG	11,298	Mark Eustice	Sydney
4	Sunday, 23 April 2:10pm	'**10.12 (72)**	North Melbourne	18.7 (115)	Lost by 43 points	SCG	18,546	Peter German	North Melbourne
5	Sunday, 30 April 2:10pm	19.11 (125)	Brisbane Bears	10.13 (73)	Won by 52 points	Carrara Stadium	9,694	Dwayne Lamb	West Coast
6	Friday, 5 May 7:40pm	'**12.9 (81)**	Fitzroy	12.17 (89)	Lost by 8 points	WACA Ground	21,268	Richard Osborne	Fitzroy

== Ladder ==
(P)	Premiers
	Qualified for finals

#	Team	P	W	L	D	PF	PA	%	Pts
1	Hawthorn (P)	22	19	3	0	2678	1748	153.2	76
2	Essendon	22	17	5	0	2240	1705	131.4	68
3	Geelong	22	16	6	0	2916	1987	146.8	64
4	Melbourne	22	14	8	0	1876	1944	96.5	56
5	Collingwood	22	13	9	0	2216	1964	112.8	52
6	Fitzroy	22	12	10	0	2069	2125	97.4	48
7	Sydney	22	11	11	0	1959	1958	100.1	44
8	Carlton	22	9	12	1	1921	2079	92.4	38
9	North Melbourne	22	9	13	0	2061	2301	89.6	36
10	Brisbane Bears	22	8	14	0	1792	2274	78.8	32
11	West Coast	22	7	15	0	1948	2247	86.7	28
12	St Kilda	22	7	15	0	2108	2502	84.3	28
13	Footscray	22	6	15	1	1614	1855	87.0	26
14	Richmond	22	5	17	0	1725	2434	70.9	20

Rules for classification: 1. premiership points; 2. percentage; 3. points for
Average score: 94.6
Source: AFL Tables
