= 1988 WAFL season =

Australian rules football season

- Teams: 8
- Premiers: Subiaco; 7th premiership
- Minor premiers: Claremont; 7th minor premiership
- Sandover Medallist: David Bain (East Perth)
- Bernie Naylor Medallist: Todd Breman (Subiaco)
- Matches played: 88

The 1988 WAFL season was the 104th season of the West Australian Football League in its various incarnations.

In many ways the "end of an era", the 1988 season saw the membership base of most WAFL clubs severely affected by the transfer of the State's best players to West Coast, a problem only marginally ameliorated by reciprocal memberships given to many Eagle members. The WAFL was laced with several off-field controversies, with chief executive Peter Cumminsky refusing to allow an exhibition match in Vancouver which Subiaco and Swan Districts planned to play on the last Saturday in September, and opposing the WAFC over a West Coast reserves team and maximum transfer fees to VFL clubs being set $13,000 lower than what the clubs said was needed to actually develop the highest standard footballers – in effect funding "destitute" VFL clubs.

The season also saw the end of the exceptionally high scoring of the past decade: for the first time since 1977 the WA(N)FL did not see a single score of over 200 points or a match where both teams scored twenty goals, while the highest score of 27.20 (182) was the lowest since 1974. The average score of 103.97 points per team per game was the lowest since 1975.

Claremont and Subiaco continued to dominate the WAFL this year under coaches Gerard Neesham and Haydn Bunton Jr. (Note: In 1987 Bunton had been rumoured to be going to Fitzroy as a replacement for David Parkin) but this time the Lions took the honours with their second convincing Grand Final win in three seasons. There was controversy because the Lions played Laurie Keene after the WAFL ruled on 7 September that a VFL match against Melbourne on the Queen's Birthday, for which Keene travelled to Melbourne an emergency, counted as a WAFL game to determine eligibility for finals. Early-1980s power club Swan Districts, who lost champion coach John Todd to the Eagles and suffered the first of numerous financial crises in the subsequent fifteen years, became the first club since the colts competition began in 1957 to suffer the ignominy of finishing last in all three grades, (Note: The only other clubs to finish last in all three grades since 1957 have been Peel Thunder in their inaugural 1997 season, and West Perth in 1992. No club would win premierships in all three grades until Subiaco in 2018 won all three premierships.) although expectations the black and whites would suffer another lengthy period in the cellar were not fulfilled in subsequent seasons. South Fremantle, who had lost their last eighteen matches of 1987, convincingly won the WAFL's pre-season competition and despite a second consecutive injury crisis with twenty-four senior list players unavailable as of Round 12, rebounded for their first finals appearance in five seasons due to the return of Maurice Rioli and the discovery of numerous young stars like Peter Sumich, Scott Watters and Stevan Jackson.

== Home-and-away season ==
=== Round 1 (Easter Monday) ===
	Round 1
Monday, 4 April	West Perth 23.23 (161)	def.	Swan Districts 10.17 (77)	Leederville Oval (crowd: 6700)
Monday, 4 April	South Fremantle 21.23 (149)	def.	East Perth 6.12 (48)	Fremantle Oval (crowd: 6800)
Monday, 4 April	Claremont 21.16 (142)	def.	Subiaco 11.9 (75)	Claremont Oval (crowd: 5700)
Monday, 4 April	Perth 13.20 (98)	def. by	East Fremantle 17.15 (117)	WACA (crowd: 4500)
Despite 32 °C (89.6 °F) heat, the WAFL is at delighted the experiment of playing the full opening round on Easter Monday, with attendances up 8,600 on the first round of 1987.; The return of Rioli, the recruitment of Willie Roe from the Royals and Magro's improvement in South's fitness gives the Bulldogs a big win over a disappointing East Perth.; Eagle discard Sean King shows the VFL newcomers may have made an error as he dominates from the wing over a Swan Districts team still becoming accustomed to new coach Blackaby.

=== Round 2 ===
	Round 2
Saturday, 9 April	Swan Districts 17.23 (125)	def.	South Fremantle 14.11 (95)	Bassendean Oval (crowd: 4383)
Saturday, 9 April	Subiaco 14.15 (99)	def.	East Perth 10.10 (70)	Subiaco Oval (crowd: 3011)
Saturday, 9 April	Claremont 8.18 (66)	def. by	Perth 10.14 (74)	Claremont Oval (crowd: 3315)
Saturday, 9 April	East Fremantle 14.19 (103)	def.	West Perth 14.9 (93)	East Fremantle Oval (crowd: 4388)
South Fremantle's lack of depth that produced a horror 1987 seems to rear its ugly head again as Bulldog team minus Rioli, Sumich, Wally Matera, Tony Amoroso, Graham Kickett and John McDonald provides Blackaby a first victory despite the loss of key ruckman Allan Sidebottom to a serious injury.; Perth end Claremont's 22-game unbeaten streak as Wiley's plan of hard pressure drives most Tiger shots off-line and Claremont do not obtain enough play to counter this.

=== Round 3 ===
	Round 3
Saturday, 16 April	Subiaco 26.18 (174)	def.	Swan Districts 9.11 (65)	Subiaco Oval (crowd: 4002)
Saturday, 16 April	West Perth 8.16 (64)	def. by	Perth 18.9 (117)	Leederville Oval (crowd: 4361)
Saturday, 16 April	East Perth 10.10 (70)	def. by	Claremont 21.23 (149)	WACA (crowd: 2744)
Saturday, 16 April	East Fremantle 11.19 (85)	def.	South Fremantle 10.12 (72)	East Fremantle Oval (crowd: 7764)
Shane Cocker and Laurie Keene decimate Swan Districts with their height, whilst the Swans suffer from a "mixed-up'sreport to wingman Geoff Passeri – reported for striking a different player from the one witness knew he struck and ultimately having his charge dismissed on grounds of insufficient evidence.; The result was Subiaco's biggest win over Swans until 1998, beating 100 points two seasons before.

=== Round 4 (Anzac Day) ===
	Round 4
Sunday, 24 April	East Fremantle 8.12 (60)	def. by	Subiaco 15.19 (109)	Geraldton (crowd: 3420)
Monday, 25 April	Swan Districts 16.16 (112)	def.	East Perth 14.12 (96)	Bassendean Oval (crowd: 4300)
Monday, 25 April	Perth 24.22 (166)	def.	South Fremantle 16.13 (109)	WACA (crowd: 9000)
Monday, 25 April	West Perth 20.13 (133)	def.	Claremont 16.7 (103)	WACA (crowd: 9000)
The two Anzac Day games at the WACA were played as a double-header for the first time in WAFL history.; Perth led by 94 points at three-quarter time as Bulldog discard Dempsey Narkle dominates in the ruck and appeared likely to pass their highest score from 1977, but kick only 1.5 (11) to 7.6 (48) in the last quarter

=== Round 5 ===
	Round 5
Saturday, 30 April	South Fremantle 16.26 (122)	def.	West Perth 6.13 (49)	Fremantle Oval (crowd: 3842)
Saturday, 30 April	Subiaco 23.10 (148)	def.	Perth 15.15 (105)	Subiaco Oval (crowd: 5015)
Saturday, 30 April	Claremont 18.19 (127)	def.	Swan Districts 13.11 (89)	Claremont Oval (crowd: 2873)
Saturday, 30 April	East Perth 16.9 (105)	def. by	East Fremantle 17.23 (125)	WACA (crowd: 2210)
The power of Brad McDougall (eight goals), plus Breman and John Georgiades (five apiece) along with future dual Sandover winner Ian Dargie's tackling and smothering in the thick of the action ensures Subiaco ends Perth's honeymoon in convincing style.; Despite losing Rioli in an opening exchange, South Fremantle rebound from three losses to thrash a "pathetic" West Perth, as Craig Edwards moves into the ruck and the returning Merv Dellar forms part of a rampant mosquito fleet.

=== Round 6 ===
	Round 6
Saturday, 7 May	West Perth 12.15 (87)	def. by	Subiaco 20.12 (132)	Leederville Oval (crowd: 4679)
Saturday, 7 May	Perth 20.20 (140)	def.	East Perth 15.6 (96)	WACA (crowd: 3102)
Saturday, 7 May	South Fremantle 14.17 (101)	def. by	Claremont 18.19 (127)	Fremantle Oval (crowd: 5159)
Saturday, 7 May	Swan Districts 15.18 (108)	def. by	East Fremantle 22.19 (151)	Bassendean Oval (crowd: 4388)
Four goals each from Don Pyke and debutant Billy Krakouer, (Note: Billy was the younger brother of former Tiger stars – then with North Melbourne – Jimmy and Phil Krakouer.) provide brilliant skills to overcome South Fremantle after that team took the lead midway through the last quarter for the second time all match.; Perth's Mick Rea seems more intent upon pushing opponents around and kicks only two goals, but Perth have no trouble with the winless Royals even with his useless antics.

=== Round 7 ===
	Round 7
Saturday, 14 May	Subiaco 25.23 (173)	def.	South Fremantle 11.13 (79)	Subiaco Oval (crowd: 2722)
Saturday, 14 May	Perth 27.20 (182)	def.	Swan Districts 11.15 (81)	WACA (crowd: 2736)
Saturday, 14 May	West Perth 10.9 (69)	def. by	East Perth 14.13 (97)	Leederville Oval (crowd: 2417)
Saturday, 14 May	East Fremantle 9.10 (64)	def. by	Claremont 11.16 (82)	East Fremantle Oval (crowd: 4086)
In the wet conditions, Tiger ruckman Mal Thomson's marking around the ground has him ear-marked for State honours, whilst Peter Melesso helps him at full-forward with five goals that force the Sharks – in Brian Peake's record 263rd match for the club – to move top ruckman Lance Durack to full-back.; Subiaco kick 20.19 (139) to 2.5 (17) after the 22-minute mark of the second quarter with devastating skills in wet weather as second-game Richard Caldow does a superb job on the wing replacing the out-of-form Greg Carpenter.; Swan Districts kick 1.10 (16) in the second quarter as Perth – in amazing display on a muddy WACA and in spite of the return of Phil Narkle – kick their highest score since 1980 and the season's highest.

=== Round 8 ===
	Round 8
Saturday, 21 May	Perth 13.11 (89)	def. by	South Fremantle 18.18 (126)	WACA (crowd: 2713)
Saturday, 21 May	Swan Districts 21.17 (143)	def.	East Perth 19.16 (130)	Bassendean Oval (crowd: 3028)
Saturday, 21 May	Claremont 18.15 (123)	def.	West Perth 6.20 (56)	Claremont Oval (crowd: 3191)
Saturday, 21 May	East Fremantle 18.13 (121)	def.	Subiaco 11.13 (79)	East Fremantle Oval (crowd: 3593)
South Fremantle stay in touch with the top four by overwhelming Perth after a slow start, with coach Wiley saying Perth did too little to attack the ball.

=== Round 9 ===
	Round 9
Saturday, 28 May	South Fremantle 20.15 (135)	def.	Swan Districts 14.12 (96)	Fremantle Oval (crowd: 3485)
Saturday, 28 May	East Perth 14.10 (94)	def. by	Subiaco 20.10 (130)	WACA (crowd: 2656)
Saturday, 28 May	Claremont 22.10 (142)	def.	Perth 16.13 (109)	Claremont Oval (crowd: 3508)
Saturday, 28 May	West Perth 14.16 (100)	def. by	East Fremantle 18.14 (122)	Leederville Oval (crowd: 2871)
A blunder by Ray Ewen – handballing after a free kick (Note: As in the VFL, handballing after a free kick was banned in the 1988 and 1989 WAFL seasons, with a ball-up occurring for breaches.) – that leads to a goal to Georgiades, plus several other serious mistakes derail East Perth's determined effort to cause a big upset with a final-quarter charge. The Royals pressure Subiaco well but their lack of skill proved decisive.

=== Round 10 ===
	Round 10
Saturday, 4 June	Subiaco 16.19 (115)	def.	Swan Districts 10.8 (68)	Subiaco Oval (crowd: 3505)
Saturday, 4 June	Perth 17.16 (118)	def.	West Perth 14.13 (97)	WACA (crowd: 3123)
Saturday, 4 June	Claremont 17.12 (114)	def.	East Perth 10.13 (73)	Claremont Oval (crowd: 3213)
Monday, 6 June	South Fremantle 16.10 (106)	def.	East Fremantle 12.12 (84)	Fremantle Oval (crowd: 9981)
East Perth suffer a fifth second-half fadeout for 1988 as Claremont score 14.7 (91) to 1.7 (13) after having been five goals behind. Scott and Owens score seven second-half goals between them after playing the first half in defence, whilst the Royals finish the game with sixteen fit players.; South Fremantle end a ten-match losing run against their derby rivals with three late goals despite being in a desperately tired state, as the Bulldogs play "keepings-off" exceptionally well. Scott Watters has twenty kicks in the first half.; Swan Districts, who have a mere 32 scoring shots to 120 in the three grades including only 2.0 (12) in the colts, enter a major crisis on and off the field.

=== Round 11 ===
	Round 11
Saturday, 11 June	Swan Districts 10.15 (75)	def. by	West Perth 16.17 (113)	Bassendean Oval (crowd: 2946)
Saturday, 11 June	East Perth 14.15 (99)	def.	South Fremantle 13.12 (90)	WACA (crowd: 3015)
Saturday, 11 June	Subiaco 10.13 (73)	def. by	Claremont 15.13 (103)	Subiaco Oval (crowd: 6301)
Saturday, 11 June	East Fremantle 22.11 (143)	def.	Perth 15.21 (111)	East Fremantle Oval (crowd: 3547)
Claremont record their seventh consecutive unbeaten match against Subiaco as Neesham's cunning in short spells flatters the depleted Lions, who have only 3.6 (24) to 12.12 (84) on the board at three-quarter time.; Boyup Brook recruit Andrew Embry completely destroys young Bulldog star Scott Watters to lead East Perth to a second win and a position only a game behind West Perth and Swan Districts.

=== Round 12 ===
	Round 12
Saturday, 18 June	Subiaco 11.8 (74)	def. by	West Perth 16.19 (115)	Subiaco Oval (crowd: 3769)
Saturday, 18 June	Perth 18.13 (121)	def.	East Perth 17.11 (113)	WACA (crowd: 3177)
Saturday, 18 June	Claremont 18.18 (126)	def.	South Fremantle 11.9 (75)	Claremont Oval (crowd: 3819)
Saturday, 18 June	East Fremantle 18.17 (125)	def.	Swan Districts 18.6 (114)	East Fremantle Oval (crowd: 2878)
For the third consecutive round South Fremantle lose a player (Craig Edwards) within the opening five minutes – with the result that the Bulldogs cannot threaten Claremont, whose defence marks superbly.; Forwards Mick Rea and Wayne Ryder recapture their form of 1986 for the first time this season to kick four goals apiece and hold off the rapidly improving Royals and leave Perth two wins clear inside the four.

=== Round 13 ===
	Round 13
Saturday, 25 June	West Perth 17.22 (124)	def.	South Fremantle 8.9 (57)	Leederville Oval (crowd: 2813)
Saturday, 25 June	Perth 9.19 (73)	def.	Subiaco 9.8 (62)	WACA (crowd: 4297)
Saturday, 25 June	Swan Districts 11.10 (76)	drew with	Claremont 10.16 (76)	Bassendean Oval (crowd: 2263)
Saturday, 25 June	East Perth 13.12 (90)	def. by	East Fremantle 22.24 (156)	WACA (crowd: 4297)
The match between Swan Districts and Claremont is the only WAFL draw on Round 13. There have been draws on every other pre-1997 WAFL round except Round 17.; For the third time in twenty-seven matches Peter Melesso saves Claremont from defeat with a kick after the siren.; Former forward Phil "Speck" Bradmore's hard defence crushes South Fremantle in a fiery match where the frustrated Mark Bayliss remonstrates with several West Perth members during play after jumping the fence.

=== Round 14 ===
	Round 14
Saturday, 2 July	South Fremantle 21.10 (136)	def.	Subiaco 17.8 (110)	Fremantle Oval (crowd: 3000)
Saturday, 2 July	Swan Districts 13.21 (99)	def. by	Perth 18.15 (123)	Bassendean Oval (crowd: 3100)
Saturday, 2 July	East Perth 15.11 (101)	def. by	West Perth 18.12 (120)	Perth Oval (crowd: 2995)
Saturday, 2 July	East Fremantle 14.10 (94)	def. by	Claremont 17.19 (121)	Subiaco Oval (crowd: 4514)
The physical power of Bayliss and Sumich allows South Fremantle a surprise win over Subiaco, aided by the dominance of returning ruckman Edwards around the ground.; Claremont overcome a major test by beating East Fremantle despite numerous injuries and being nineteen points behind early in the second quarter. Future Fremantle backline mainstay Dale Kickett in his second match proves outstanding up forward.

=== Round 15 ===
	Round 15
Saturday, 9 July	Swan Districts 20.22 (142)	def.	West Perth 11.12 (78)	Bassendean Oval (crowd: 3106)
Saturday, 9 July	East Perth 9.17 (71)	def. by	South Fremantle 10.12 (72)	WACA (crowd: 2600)
Saturday, 9 July	Claremont 17.15 (117)	def. by	Subiaco 18.11 (119)	Claremont Oval (crowd: 3682)
Saturday, 9 July	East Fremantle 21.14 (140)	def.	Perth 13.20 (98)	East Fremantle Oval (crowd: 3626)
Subiaco jump Claremont with 7.2 (44) to one goal in the opening 22 minutes and hold on to win a thriller after four consecutive defeats. Claremont player/coach Neesham was reported by three umpires and by Subiaco after he broke Glen Hutcheson's jaw in another incident – being ultimately suspended for three matches.; South Fremantle produce an amazing comeback to win from 35 points down after scoring only three goals in the first three quarters, to the violent anger of Royal coach Gerard McNeill, who became upset at how defensive his team turned in that last quarter.; The dominance of a hard-running defence helps Swan Districts continue its improved form, as they keep West Perth goalless for the first 45 minutes to end any Falcon finals hopes. Grasso, Joe Cormack and Troy Ugle dominate for Swans.

=== Round 16 ===
	Round 16
Saturday, 16 July	South Fremantle 25.6 (156)	def.	Swan Districts 17.13 (115)	Fremantle Oval (crowd: 3260)
Saturday, 16 July	Subiaco 18.18 (126)	def.	East Perth 13.3 (81)	Subiaco Oval (crowd: 2928)
Saturday, 16 July	Perth 13.16 (94)	def. by	Claremont 23.17 (155)	WACA (crowd: 3685)
Saturday, 16 July	West Perth 17.19 (121)	def.	East Fremantle 13.10 (88)	Leederville Oval (crowd: 2624)
Despite one brilliant mark by Mick Rea, Perth are overwhelmed apart from a 6.3 (39) to 4.7 (31) second quarter by a strengthened Tiger team that produces its best team football of 1988.

=== Round 17 ===
	Round 17
Saturday, 23 July	South Fremantle 13.13 (91)	def.	Perth 10.12 (72)	Fremantle Oval (crowd: 2700)
Saturday, 23 July	East Perth 10.12 (72)	def.	Swan Districts 6.8 (44)	WACA (crowd: 1766)
Saturday, 23 July	West Perth 7.7 (49)	def.	Claremont 4.6 (30)	Leederville Oval (crowd: 2153)
Saturday, 23 July	Subiaco 6.7 (43)	def.	East Fremantle 3.9 (27)	Subiaco Oval (crowd: 2717)
On Perth's wettest football day since 9 June 1945 with 69.0 millimetres (2.72 in) of rain, East Fremantle score just one goal after the two-minute mark of the first quarter, and their score is the lowest conceded by Subiaco since 2 July 1932.; With Wally Matera's speed on a heavy ground and Perth's wastefulness early in the opening quarter when they had the wind and conditions were easiest, South draw level with the Demons in fourth after a high-standard match for the conditions – where club colours were unrecognisable in the mud and darkness.; Swan Districts fail to seal the wooden spoon as East Perth play much superior wet-weather football – especially in the third quarter when they score five goals – and the black and whites lose Allan Sidebottom to a back rupture.

=== Round 18 ===
	Round 18
Saturday, 30 July	Swan Districts 15.7 (97)	def. by	Subiaco 15.18 (108)	Bassendean Oval (crowd: 3103)
Saturday, 30 July	West Perth 13.8 (86)	def. by	Perth 19.14 (128)	Leederville Oval (crowd: 4568)
Saturday, 30 July	East Perth 11.6 (72)	def. by	Claremont 20.21 (141)	WACA (crowd: 2757)
Saturday, 30 July	East Fremantle 13.13 (91)	def. by	South Fremantle 26.20 (176)	East Fremantle Oval (crowd: 6682)
Stan Magro, following his thirty-third birthday during the week, sees South Fremantle produce a brilliant display and defeat Perth, on percentage, for fourth position. Although young Sumich scored five goals nine behinds, Craig Edwards with an outstanding eighteen marks and twenty kicks and centre half-back John McDonald were the stars.; A dramatic second-half fadeout by West Perth – following upon a first quarter where they obtained 78 kicks to 30 and 28 marks to just four – results from Perth's switch of former Richmond premiership player Stephen Mount to centre half-forward. After that move the Demons score 16.11 (107) to 4.3 (27).

=== Round 19 ===
	Round 19
Saturday, 6 August	South Fremantle 22.7 (139)	def.	West Perth 16.15 (111)	Fremantle Oval (crowd: 4622)
Saturday, 6 August	Perth 15.12 (102)	def. by	Subiaco 18.21 (129)	WACA (crowd: 4187)
Saturday, 6 August	Claremont 18.16 (124)	def.	Swan Districts 11.7 (73)	Claremont Oval (crowd: 2727)
Saturday, 6 August	East Fremantle 13.15 (93)	def. by	East Perth 16.15 (111)	East Fremantle Oval (crowd: 2391)
East Fremantle – clear second in mid-July – become in danger of losing fourth position by losing to last-placed East Perth, who make many mistakes to skilfully exploit the Sharks' poor discipline in a rough match. Top rover David Bushell – the worst offender – obtained three weeks' suspension plus a nominal fine of one dollar at Monday night's tribunal session.

=== Round 20 ===
	Round 20
Sunday, 14 August (11:40 am)	Claremont 13.20 (98)	def. by	South Fremantle 16.9 (105)	Subiaco Oval (crowd: 6486)
Sunday, 14 August (2:15 pm)	Subiaco 20.20 (140)	def.	West Perth 7.17 (59)	Subiaco Oval (crowd: 6486)
Sunday, 14 August (2:15 pm)	Perth 16.12 (108)	def.	East Perth 15.13 (103)	WACA (crowd: 2632)
Sunday, 14 August (2:15 pm)	East Fremantle 16.19 (115)	def.	Swan Districts 11.13 (79)	East Fremantle Oval (crowd: 2335)
South Fremantle hold off an inaccurate Claremont – for whom Melesso kicked 2.6 (18) – to be in the box seat for a first finals berth since 1983, standing 2.04 percent ahead of East Fremantle and a game and 3.6 percent ahead of Perth.; Wayne Ryder boots Perth into a possible finals place via a brilliant after-the-siren goal from fifty metres out on the boundary line, after the Royals put a hurried kick from a congested pack out on the full.

=== Round 21 ===
	Round 21
Saturday, 20 August	South Fremantle 16.19 (115)	def.	Subiaco 11.12 (78)	Fremantle Oval (crowd: 6618)
Saturday, 20 August	Swan Districts 17.11 (113)	def. by	Perth 26.13 (169)	Bassendean Oval (crowd: 3541)
Saturday, 20 August	West Perth 15.17 (107)	def. by	East Perth 16.17 (113)	Leederville Oval (crowd: 2468)
Saturday, 20 August	Claremont 12.16 (88)	def. by	East Fremantle 18.14 (122)	Claremont Oval (crowd: 3871)
For the second successive season, East Perth avoid the wooden spoon with a last round win.; Perth keep pressure on all through, including a huge-scoring last quarter that sees 19.5 (120) kicked, only to realise that wins by the two Fremantle clubs had ensured the Demons miss the finals and ended the career of Mick Rea – who kicked 14 goals in the reserves.; Debutant ruckman Clinton Wolf combines with key forwards Clinton Browning and Colin Waterson to produce East Fremantle's finest display of 1988 and unexpectedly stay fourth against the Perth challenge.

== Ladder ==
1988 WAFL ladder
Pos	Team	Pld	W	L	D	PF	PA	PP	Pts
1	Claremont	21	14	6	1	2354	1796	131.1	58
2	Subiaco (P)	21	14	7	0	2296	1916	119.8	56
3	South Fremantle	21	13	8	0	2306	2137	107.9	52
4	East Fremantle	21	13	8	0	2226	2104	105.8	52
5	Perth	21	12	9	0	2397	2280	105.1	48
6	West Perth	21	8	13	0	1992	2201	90.5	32
7	East Perth	21	5	16	0	1905	2408	79.1	20
8	Swan Districts	21	4	16	1	1991	2625	75.8	18

Rules for classification: 1) points; 2) percentage; 3) number of points for.
(P) Premiers

== Finals ==
=== First semi-final ===
	First semi-final
Saturday, 27 August	South Fremantle 14.20 (104)	def. by	East Fremantle 24.14 (158)	Subiaco Oval (crowd: 19,668)
South Fremantle, playing finals for the first time since 1983 and with only three players having previous experience therein, do not cope with the pressure. Boom forward Sumich scores 1.7 (13).

=== Second semi-final ===
	Second semi-final
Sunday, 4 September	Claremont 22.12 (144)	def.	Subiaco 17.17 (119)	Subiaco Oval (crowd: 11,175)
To accommodate televising the Eagles' first VFL final to Perth, the last three WAFL finals were played on the Sunday for the first time.; Peter Melesso kicks nine goals in Claremont's 17.5 (107) to 5.7 (37) first half, before going on what he terms "walkabout" and not adding to his tally, as Claremont's fade-out proves ominous for the "big one".

=== Preliminary final ===
	Preliminary final
Sunday, 11 September	Subiaco 19.10 (124)	def.	East Fremantle 17.19 (121)	Subiaco Oval (crowd: 13,112)
Lion rookie Gary Kemp goals with thirty seconds remaining to win a fluctuating match where Subiaco score only 4.5 (29) to 13.11 (89) in the second and third quarters. Key Shark defender Shane Ellis was injured and could not counter John Georgiades, who kicks three goals in each of the first and final quarters.

=== Grand Final ===
1988 WAFL Grand Final
Sunday, 18 September	Claremont	def. by	Subiaco	Subiaco Oval (crowd: 28,183)
2.3 (15); 5.6 (36); 5.9 (39); 8.12 (60)	Q1; Q2; Q3; Final	3.3 (21); 6.4 (40); 10.7 (67); 19.8 (122)	Umpires: Phil O‘Reilly, David Johnson; Simpson Medal: Mick Lee (Subiaco)
Malaxos 3, Brayshow 2, Ahmat, Allan, Neesham	Goals	Georgiades 6, Cocker 3, McDougall 2, Jones 2, Breman 2, Jennings, Brian Taylor, Lee, Carpenter
Neesham, Pyke, David O‘Connell, Beers, Scott, Thorne	Best	Keene, Georgiades, Brian Taylor, Breman, Carpenter, Neil Taylor, Willet, Lee
Peter Melesso for striking Rod Willet in first quarter (three umpires); Peter Melesso for striking Ian Dargie in first quarter Dale Kickett for unduly rough play toward Clint Brown in first quarter	Reports	Ian Dargie for striking Peter Thorne in first quarter
Subiaco, aided controversially by Eagle Laurie Keene and providing a more traditional style against Neesham's innovative "chip and draw" which had demolished all opponents during the previous season, run away with the game after half-time in hot 31 °C (87.8 °F) weather.
