= Stuart Griffiths =

Stuart Griffiths may refer to:

- Stuart Griffiths (footballer), Australian rules footballer
- Stuart Griffiths (photographer), British photographer and writer
