= Mark Webb =

Mark, Marc, or Marcus Webb may refer to:

== Sportspeople ==
- Mark Webb (placekicker) (born 1960), British American football kicker
- Mark Webb (safety) (born 1998), American football safety
- Mark Webb (Australian footballer), see West Coast Eagles draft history
- Marc Webb (footballer) (born 1979), Australian rules football coach
- Marcus Webb (born 1970), American basketball player

== Others ==
- Marc Webb (born 1974), American director and filmmaker
- Mark Web, character in 100 Tears
