= 1994 WAFL season =

Australian rules football season

- Teams: 8
- Premiers: East Fremantle; 28th premiership
- Minor premiers: Claremont; 11th minor premiership
- Sandover Medallist: Ian Dargie (Subiaco)
- Bernie Naylor Medallist: Brenton Cooper (Perth)
- Matches played: 90

The 1994 WAFL season was the 110th season of the West Australian Football League in its various incarnations.

It was the final season before, to stem fears of dominance by the Eagles of the AFL, a second Western Australian team, the Fremantle Dockers was added to the national competition. Along with financial difficulties faced by perennial stragglers Perth and to a lesser extent West Perth, East Perth, Swan Districts and on-field power club Claremont, this made the league consider substantial measures to deal with the declining popularity of the competition. The 1994 season did see two home-and-away attendances of over ten thousand for the last time in the competition's history.

With president Tom James admitting that if the Falcons remained based in the aging districts of Daglish and Shenton Park, the club would be extinct by 2000, West Perth took the league to the rapidly growing northwestern suburbs of the city by moving to Arena Joondalup in a newly developing region of the city, vacating Leederville Oval for six seasons until the redevelopment of Perth Oval as a rectangular soccer field for the Perth Glory forced the Falcons' traditional rivals East Perth to move there. The 1994 season also saw the last WAFL games at the WACA Ground until 2022, due to redevelopment of the drainage and grandstands of Subiaco Oval during this and the early part of the 1995 season.

Another notable feature was the first converts to Australian Rules from basketball, Daniel Bandy and Leon Harris, who debuted for Perth and East Perth respectively. Bandy was to be a mainstay for the Dockers during their early years in the AFL.

== Home-and-away season ==
=== Round 1 (Easter weekend) ===
	Round 1
Saturday, 2 April	Perth 22.16 (148)	def.	Subiaco 17.11 (113)	Lathlain Park (crowd: 2735)
Saturday, 2 April	Claremont 11.12 (78)	def.	West Perth 9.15 (69)	Claremont Oval (crowd: 3039)
Monday, 4 April	East Perth 11.13 (79)	def.	Swan Districts 9.12 (66)	Perth Oval (crowd: 4004)
Monday, 4 April	East Fremantle 17.17 (119)	def.	South Fremantle 14.15 (99)	East Fremantle Oval (crowd: 5905)
With recruit Brenton Cooper kicking seven goals, Perth score a surprise win for new coach David Glascott.

=== Round 2 ===
	Round 2
Saturday, 9 April	East Perth 9.10 (64)	def. by	East Fremantle 16.17 (113)	WACA (crowd: 2802)
Saturday, 9 April	Swan Districts 21.10 (136)	def.	Perth 13.11 (89)	Bassendean Oval (crowd: 2453)
Saturday, 9 April	Subiaco 6.12 (48)	def. by	Claremont 17.10 (112)	Subiaco Oval (crowd: 2291)
Sunday, 10 April	South Fremantle 11.7 (73)	def. by	West Perth 12.19 (91)	Fremantle Oval (crowd: 3597)
Metallurgist Leigh Wardell-Johnson shows poise to help overcome a Subiaco team affected by the difference in training methods between WAFL and AFL for seven West Coast Eagle members.; The loss of full-back Anthony Reynolds (who held Jon Dorotich extremely well) to a knee reconstruction sours a West Perth win much more convincing than the scoreboard suggested.

=== Round 3 ===
	Round 3
Saturday, 16 April	Subiaco 11.9 (75)	def. by	Swan Districts 12.21 (93)	Subiaco Oval (crowd: 2424)
Saturday, 16 April	East Fremantle 19.6 (120)	def.	West Perth 16.8 (104)	East Fremantle Oval (crowd: 2805)
Saturday, 16 April	Claremont 18.16 (124)	def.	East Perth 9.18 (72)	Claremont Oval (crowd: 2082)
Saturday, 16 April (6:45 pm)	Perth 10.11 (71)	def. by	South Fremantle 15.15 (105)	WACA (crowd: 3143)

=== Round 4 (Anzac Day) ===
	Round 4
Saturday, 23 April	South Fremantle 13.11 (89)	def. by	Subiaco 17.11 (113)	Fremantle Oval (crowd: 2430)
Saturday, 23 April	Perth 11.16 (82)	def. by	East Fremantle 21.13 (139)	Lathlain Park (crowd: 2204)
Saturday, 23 April	Swan Districts 14.15 (99)	def. by	Claremont 17.15 (117)	Bassendean Oval (crowd: 3230)
Monday, 25 April	West Perth 9.7 (61)	def. by	East Perth 12.10 (82)	Arena Joondalup (crowd: 15082)
The Anzac Day match was the first WAFL game at West Perth's new home of Arena Joondalup, and attracted a crowd never equalled at the ground. It also featured a motorcade from old West Perth captains to Joondalup.

=== Round 5 ===
	Round 5
Saturday, 30 April	Swan Districts 16.13 (109)	def.	East Fremantle 12.8 (80)	Bassendean Oval (crowd: 3357)
Saturday, 30 April (6:45 pm)	Claremont 19.10 (124)	def.	South Fremantle 9.10 (64)	WACA (crowd: 2441)
Sunday, 1 May	East Perth 14.11 (95)	def.	Perth 9.8 (62)	Perth Oval (crowd: 2714)
Sunday, 1 May	Subiaco 10.6 (66)	def. by	West Perth 23.15 (153)	Subiaco Oval (crowd: 3853)
West Perth annihilate Subiaco with twelve unanswered goals after an even first half, with ruckman Craig Nelson dominating, and leave the 1993 preliminary finalists last on the ladder.

=== Round 6 ===
	Round 6
Saturday, 7 May	West Perth 17.11 (113)	def.	Perth 14.9 (93)	Arena Joondalup (crowd: 3531)
Saturday, 7 May	South Fremantle 8.13 (61)	def. by	Swan Districts 14.10 (94)	Fremantle Oval (crowd: 2797)
Saturday, 7 May	Claremont 15.13 (103)	def.	East Fremantle 12.6 (78)	Claremont Oval (crowd: 2930)
Saturday, 7 May (6:45 pm)	East Perth 12.7 (79)	def. by	Subiaco 23.11 (149)	WACA (crowd: 2534)
With eventual Sandover winner Dargie sparking their attack, Subiaco make an abrupt return to form. Jason Heatley, after previously failing to live up to his 1993 form, kicks six goals in the first fifteen minutes and finishes with ten for an amazing 27 in three matches against the Royals.; Perth lose key Victorian recruit Tony Campbell (who came to seek a place in the Dockers' squad) with achilles tendon surgery, but press West Perth much more than expected.

=== Round 7 ===
	Round 7
Saturday, 14 May	West Perth 10.15 (75)	def. by	Swan Districts 17.6 (108)	Arena Joondalup (crowd: 5217)
Saturday, 14 May	East Perth 14.10 (94)	def. by	South Fremantle 21.9 (135)	Perth Oval (crowd: 2367)
Saturday, 14 May	East Fremantle 16.8 (104)	def. by	Subiaco 21.10 (136)	East Fremantle Oval (crowd: 2592)
Saturday, 14 May	Perth 13.18 (96)	def. by	Claremont 24.5 (149)	Lathlain Park (crowd: 2133)
Claremont's 53-point win is the biggest in WAFL history by a team with fewer scoring shots.

=== Round 8 ===
	Round 8
Saturday, 21 May	Swan Districts 21.15 (141)	def.	Perth 8.16 (64)	Bassendean Oval (crowd: 2000)
Saturday, 21 May	East Fremantle 19.9 (123)	def.	East Perth 14.9 (93)	East Fremantle Oval (crowd: 1736)
Saturday, 21 May	Claremont 16.13 (109)	def.	Subiaco 10.10 (70)	Claremont Oval (crowd: 2500)
Sunday, 22 May	West Perth 14.7 (91)	def. by	South Fremantle 16.11 (107)	Arena Joondalup (crowd: 1433)
Swan Districts chair 1990 Simpson Medallist Greg Walker off the field after he announces he will move to Woodville-West Torrens due to his work in the wine industry. Shane Strempel, returning from a year in Port Hedland, kicks seven goals.; South Fremantle manage a surprising fightback from five goals behind after one quarter in gale-force wind and rain, as the Falcons lack their usual attack on the ball when the rain ceases at half-time.

=== Round 9 ===
	Round 9
Saturday, 28 May	Subiaco 8.14 (62)	def. by	Swan Districts 12.7 (79)	Subiaco Oval (crowd: 2506)
Saturday, 28 May	Perth 12.15 (87)	def. by	South Fremantle 17.14 (116)	Lathlain Park (crowd: 2074)
Saturday, 28 May	West Perth 15.13 (103)	def.	East Fremantle 11.10 (76)	Arena Joondalup (crowd: 2534)
Saturday, 28 May	East Perth 8.10 (58)	def. by	Claremont 21.15 (141)	Perth Oval (crowd: 2228)
East Fremantle suffer an amazing second-half collapse kicking only 1.4 (10) to 9.8 (62), including seven goals by the Falcons into the wind in the last quarter, as the previously out-of-sorts Turley and Mildenhall come to dominate when positioned in the centre.

=== Round 10 (Foundation Day) ===
	Round 10
Saturday, 4 June	Subiaco 19.12 (126)	def.	Perth 19.10 (124)	Subiaco Oval (crowd: 1518)
Saturday, 4 June	Swan Districts 14.12 (96)	def.	East Perth 11.14 (80)	Bassendean Oval (crowd: 2800)
Saturday, 4 June	Claremont 11.10 (76)	def.	West Perth 9.10 (64)	Claremont Oval (crowd: 2200)
Monday, 6 June	South Fremantle 12.12 (84)	def. by	East Fremantle 18.14 (122)	Fremantle Oval (crowd: 15500)
The Foundation Day Fremantle derby was the last WAFL/Westar regular season attendance of over 10,000 until 1999, and the last over 15,000 ever.; Gerard Neesham bows out as coach of Claremont with a fourteenth consecutive win despite surrendering a 28 point lead in a low-scoring match.

=== Round 11 ===
	Round 11
Saturday, 11 June	West Perth 19.15 (129)	def.	Subiaco 11.12 (78)	Arena Joondalup (crowd: 2442)
Saturday, 18 June	South Fremantle 14.10 (94)	def. by	Claremont 20.6 (126)	Fremantle Oval (crowd: 2503)
Saturday, 18 June	Perth 16.14 (110)	def.	East Perth 11.12 (78)	Lathlain Park (crowd: 2361)
Saturday, 18 June	East Fremantle 16.7 (103)	def. by	Swan Districts 18.12 (120)	East Fremantle Oval (crowd: 2500)
Perth end a losing run of nine games as forward pocket Malcolm Williams, who immediately afterwards injured his knee, took the pressure off Cooper with nine goals and 17-year-old wingman Troy Cook plays a decisive role as a loose man in defence.; This was the first match played for the Greg Brehaut Shield in memory of the former Perth player and East Perth coach who died in 1993.

=== Round 12 ===
	Round 12
Saturday, 25 June	Perth 12.10 (82)	def. by	West Perth 16.10 (106)	Lathlain Park (crowd: 2179)
Saturday, 25 June	Swan Districts 22.12 (144)	def.	South Fremantle 13.13 (91)	Bassendean Oval (crowd: 2800)
Saturday, 25 June	East Fremantle 15.10 (100)	def.	Claremont 7.15 (57)	East Fremantle Oval (crowd: 2286)
Sunday, 26 June	East Perth 12.5 (77)	def. by	Subiaco 19.21 (135)	Perth Oval (crowd: 2200)
In a Grand Final preview, East Fremantle end Claremont's best-ever start to a season and the first team unbeaten over halfway in since the Sharks of 1985.; Despite having had no training, 35-year-old Mike Richardson – discarded by John Todd at the end of 1993 – makes a comeback for West Perth when the Falcons lost key players to AFL duty.

=== Round 13 ===
	Round 13
Saturday, 2 July	Claremont 10.19 (79)	def.	Perth 11.6 (72)	Claremont Oval (crowd: 1850)
Saturday, 2 July	South Fremantle 9.17 (71)	def.	East Perth 8.13 (61)	Fremantle Oval (crowd: 2244)
Saturday, 2 July	Subiaco 17.11 (113)	def.	East Fremantle 9.7 (61)	Subiaco Oval (crowd: 2196)
Saturday, 2 July	West Perth 13.14 (92)	def.	Swan Districts 10.7 (67)	Arena Joondalup (crowd: 2265)
19-year-old rookie Scott Crook produces a surprise performance on returning Eagle star Peter Sumich, holding him to one goal in his first WA(S)FL match since 1989 and leaving South a desperate struggle against the cellar-dwellers.; For the first time, Subiaco play to the potential expected from them by critics, as midfielders Hampson, Godden, Connell and Snow lead the Lions out of the blocks with six first-quarter goals into the wind – after which the Sharks never get into the game.

=== Round 14 ===
	Round 14
Saturday, 9 July	Claremont 11.8 (74)	def.	East Perth 5.12 (42)	Claremont Oval (crowd: 1638)
Saturday, 9 July	South Fremantle 6.8 (44)	def. by	Perth 6.15 (51)	Fremantle Oval (crowd: 1605)
Saturday, 9 July	Swan Districts 10.6 (66)	def. by	Subiaco 15.14 (104)	Bassendean Oval (crowd: 1800)
Saturday, 9 July	East Fremantle 9.12 (66)	def.	West Perth 7.6 (48)	East Fremantle Oval (crowd: 2196)
In wet conditions, East Perth are the first team goalless in the second half since East Fremantle against Subiaco in 1988.; A few stern words from fans at half-time gives rookie Tiger coach Mark Riley valuable experience as he leads the Tigers to a seven-goal second half in the mud.; Warren Nicholas' 150th match sees Adrian Barich and Wayne Allard control play so well that Perth's ineffective forward work cannot give the Bulldogs a win. It was Perth's first win at Fremantle since 1987.

=== Round 15 ===
	Round 15
Saturday, 16 July	South Fremantle 13.16 (94)	def. by	West Perth 19.7 (121)	Fremantle Oval (crowd: 2400)
Saturday, 16 July	East Perth 13.15 (93)	def. by	East Fremantle 20.11 (131)	Perth Oval (crowd: 1400)
Saturday, 16 July	Perth 14.12 (96)	def.	Swan Districts 12.8 (80)	Lathlain Park (crowd: 2500)
Saturday, 16 July	Subiaco 19.10 (124)	def.	Claremont 10.7 (67)	Subiaco Oval (crowd: 2400)
Subiaco's dominance of possession from the centre – 144 possessions from six midfielders as against Claremont's 110 amongst eight – allows it to inflict the Tigers' worst loss for two seasons, despite losing key forwards Jason Heatley and Karl Langdon early on.

=== Round 16 ===
	Round 16
Saturday, 23 July	East Fremantle 15.15 (105)	def.	South Fremantle 7.8 (50)	East Fremantle Oval (crowd: 3909)
Saturday, 23 July	Perth 9.10 (64)	def. by	Subiaco 14.14 (98)	Lathlain Park (crowd: 1934)
Saturday, 23 July	East Perth 12.11 (83)	def.	Swan Districts 8.12 (60)	Perth Oval (crowd: 1700)
Saturday, 23 July	West Perth 11.12 (78)	def.	Claremont 8.9 (57)	Arena Joondalup (crowd: 2064)
Former specialist ruckman Paul Harding is unexpectedly shifted into defence and dominates the Bulldog attack, notably Jon Dorotich, to leave the Sharks only 2.7 percent short of third position behind the disappointing Swan Districts.; Subiaco's suspect defence – in 1993 it conceded more points than any other team bar Perth – led by ex-forward Daniel Metropolis, plays exceptionally well to virtually seal the top five with five rounds remaining.

=== Round 17 ===
	Round 17
Saturday, 30 July	West Perth 22.10 (142)	def.	East Perth 13.13 (91)	Arena Joondalup (crowd: 2782)
Saturday, 30 July	Perth 14.10 (94)	def.	East Fremantle 14.8 (92)	Lathlain Park (crowd: 2029)
Saturday, 30 July	South Fremantle 14.15 (99)	def. by	Subiaco 17.8 (110)	Fremantle Oval (crowd: 2500)
Saturday, 30 July	Swan Districts 14.14 (98)	def.	Claremont 12.15 (87)	Bassendean Oval (crowd: 2500)
With a major upset over the eventual premiers, Perth move off the bottom.

=== Round 18 ===
	Round 18
Saturday, 6 August	Claremont 20.12 (132)	def.	South Fremantle 14.8 (92)	Claremont Oval (crowd: 1600)
Saturday, 6 August	Swan Districts 17.12 (114)	def.	East Fremantle 12.11 (83)	Bassendean Oval (crowd: 2116)
Sunday, 7 August	East Perth 14.10 (94)	def.	Perth 7.15 (57)	Perth Oval (crowd: 1948)
Sunday, 7 August	Subiaco 22.11 (143)	def.	West Perth 10.8 (68)	Subiaco Oval (crowd: 4213)
Although without Heatley and with Karl Langdon reported, Subiaco overwhelm West Perth for their seventh consecutive victory, kicking 17.8 (110) to 5.4 (34) to three-quarter time.

=== Round 19 ===
	Round 19
Saturday, 13 August	Subiaco 17.14 (116)	def.	East Perth 15.12 (102)	Subiaco Oval (crowd: 2369)
Saturday, 13 August	West Perth 18.18 (126)	def.	Perth 11.7 (73)	Arena Joondalup (crowd: 2501)
Saturday, 13 August (6:45 pm)	South Fremantle 17.9 (111)	def.	Swan Districts 12.8 (80)	Fremantle Oval (crowd: 3500)
Sunday, 14 August	Claremont 10.11 (71)	def. by	East Fremantle 18.14 (122)	Claremont Oval (crowd: 3500)
East Fremantle's superb tagging decimate the league-leading Tigers after quarter-time, leaving the Sharks a win from the double chance with two rounds to play – and question marks over the post-Neesham Tigers' capability of winning the flag.

=== Round 20 ===
	Round 20
Saturday, 20 August	East Perth 14.15 (99)	def.	South Fremantle 14.12 (96)	Perth Oval (crowd: 1799)
Saturday, 20 August	East Fremantle 23.6 (144)	def.	Subiaco 6.12 (48)	East Fremantle Oval (crowd: 3000)
Saturday, 20 August	Perth 9.8 (62)	def. by	Claremont 18.14 (122)	Lathlain Park (crowd: 1896)
Saturday, 20 August	Swan Districts 15.5 (95)	def. by	West Perth 15.7 (97)	Bassendean Oval (crowd: 4073)
With Paul Harding seemingly having the field to himself in the ruck, East Fremantle completely crush Subiaco, ending the Lions' eight-game winning streak and gaining revenge for the 1993 loss that put them out of the finals.; Former Subiaco and West Coast premiership player Dwayne Lamb plays his 300th game of senior football in the Lions' debacle.; West Perth produce a stunning escape with six of the last seven goals to consign Swan Districts to the sudden-death elimination final.; South Fremantle just fail to fight back from six goals down at half-time when fired up by the report of spearhead Dorotich for threatening language to field umpire Mark Warren, and East Perth effectively assure Perth of a second consecutive wooden spoon.

=== Round 21 ===
	Round 21
Saturday, 27 August	East Perth 9.9 (63)	def. by	West Perth 14.10 (94)	Perth Oval (crowd: 3,800)
Saturday, 27 August	Subiaco 30.23 (203)	def.	South Fremantle 12.10 (82)	Subiaco Oval (crowd: 2441)
Saturday, 27 August	Claremont 14.11 (95)	def.	Swan Districts 8.8 (56)	Claremont Oval (crowd: 2108)
Saturday, 27 August	East Fremantle 21.19 (145)	def.	Perth 8.7 (55)	East Fremantle Oval (crowd: 2045)
With Lamb playing his 150th game for the Lions and Heatley kicking 10.1, Subiaco fail by a single point to equal their highest score from ten years beforehand against Perth

== Ladder ==
1994 WAFL ladder
Pos	Team	Pld	W	L	D	PF	PA	PP	Pts
1	Claremont	21	16	5	0	2100	1658	126.7	64
2	East Fremantle (P)	21	13	8	0	2226	1840	121.0	52
3	West Perth	21	13	8	0	2025	1788	113.3	52
4	Subiaco	21	13	8	0	2230	2049	108.8	52
5	Swan Districts	21	12	9	0	2001	1824	109.7	48
6	South Fremantle	21	6	15	0	1857	2238	83.0	24
7	East Perth	21	6	15	0	1679	2156	77.9	24
8	Perth	21	5	16	0	1732	2297	75.4	20

Rules for classification: 1) points; 2) percentage; 3) number of points for.
(P) Premiers

== Finals ==
=== Elimination and Qualifying Finals ===
	Qualifying Final
Saturday, 3 September (2:30 pm)	East Fremantle 14.11 (95)	def.	West Perth 9.13 (67)	WACA (crowd: 11,835)

	Elimination Final
Saturday, 3 September (5:30 pm)	Subiaco 13.11 (89)	def.	Swan Districts 11.7 (73)	WACA (crowd: 11,835)
Since the two finals were played at the same venue on the same day, the attendance figure is the same.; These were the last WAFL games at the WACA Ground until 2022, used because improvements to Subiaco Oval reduced its capacity and to help reduce the stress on its surface, which needed re-digging to improve drainage.

=== Semi-finals ===
	First semi-final
Saturday, 10 September (2:30 pm)	West Perth 9.13 (67)	def.	Subiaco 10.4 (64)	Subiaco Oval (crowd: 7,100)
West Perth manage to always stay a kick in front during a thrilling finish in sloppy conditions.

	Second semi-final
Saturday, 10 September (5:30 pm)	Claremont 17.13 (115)	def.	East Fremantle 11.2 (68)	Subiaco Oval (crowd: 7,100)
Since the two semi-finals were played at the same venue on the same day, the attendance figure is the same.; With Paul Morgan kicking eight goals and Daniel Panizza keeping Andrew Lockyer to 0.2 (2), Claremont are never troubled to make their way into the Grand Final

=== Preliminary final ===
	Preliminary final
Saturday, 17 September	East Fremantle 15.11 (101)	def.	West Perth 11.18 (84)	Subiaco Oval (crowd: 8,286)
Several major moves by Shark coach Ken Judge, including veteran Malaxos from defence to the ball and Paul Harding to defence, completely break down the system of West Perth, who score only 2.3 (15) to 11.8 (74) in the second half.

=== Grand Final ===
1994 WAFL Grand Final
Saturday, 24 September	Claremont	def. by	East Fremantle	Subiaco Oval (crowd: 17,594)
1.3 (9); 3.4 (22); 3.7 (25); 10.10 (70)	Q1; Q2; Q3; Final	3.2 (20); 10.4 (64); 12.8 (80); 13.13 (91)	Umpires: Greg Scroop, Sam Kronja; Simpson Medal: Mark Amaranti (East Fremantle)
Gary Edwards 3, Wardell-Johnson 2, Morgan 2, Green, Sheldrick, Merillo	Goals	Amaranti 4, Lally 2, Bilcich 2, Lockyer, Davidson, Dhurrkay, Pobjoy, Harding
Panizza, Merillo, Leach, Jones, Wira, Scott Edwards	Best	Amaranti, Treleven, Sanders, Condon, Harding, Davies
An opening skirmish between Damien Condon and second semi hero Morgan shows East Fremantle mean business as they completely break down Claremont's attack for three quarters in hot weather.
