= Bradley Fox =

Bradley Fox may refer to:

- Bradley R. Fox, Bahamian politician
- Brad Fox (born 1969), Australian rules footballer
- Bradley Fox (Neighbours), character from the soap opera Neighbours
