= John O'Connell (footballer, born 1932) =

Australian rules footballer (1932–2026)

Personal information
- Full name: John Edward O'Connell
- Born: 8 March 1932
- Died: 13 June 2026 (aged 94)
- Original team: Claremont Metropolitan Jrs
- Height: 193 cm (6 ft 4 in)
- Weight: 89 kg (196 lb)

Playing career
Years	Club	Games (Goals)
1950–1954, 1961–1963	Claremont	156
1955–1960	Geelong	81 (65)

John Edward O'Connell (8 March 1932 – 13 June 2026) was an Australian rules footballer who played with Claremont in the Western Australian National Football League (WANFL) and Geelong in the Victorian Football League (VFL).

== Playing career ==
O'Connell was a ruckman, who could also play as a key position player, mostly up forward. He played for Claremont during the early 1950s and then moved to Melbourne in 1955 due to his employment. Geelong secured his services, as their defender John Hyde wished to join Claremont and they needed something in return.

He kicked four goals on his VFL debut, in the opening round of the 1955 season, against South Melbourne at Kardinia Park. The following year he kicked 29 goals for the season to finish second to Noel Rayson in the Geelong goal-kicking.

When he returned to Claremont in 1961, O'Connell was appointed assistant playing coach. He played until 1963, retiring just one year before Claremont ended their premiership drought. He finished with 156 WANFL games and had also represented the Western Australian interstate team on 10 occasions.

== Post-football career ==
O'Connell remained involved in football as both a radio commentator and administrator. He served as General Manager of the WAFL from 1987 to 1991 and was then appointed Claremont club president, a position he held for six years.

Two of his sons, David and Michael O'Connell, played for the West Coast Eagles.

He was inducted into the West Australian Football Hall of Fame in 2012.

O'Connell died on 13 June 2026, at the age of 94.
