= Tim Harrington =

Tim Harrington may refer to:

- Tim Harrington (footballer)
- Tim Harrington (singer)

== See also ==
- Timothy Harrington, Irish journalist and politician
- Timothy Joseph Harrington, American clergyman
