= Justin McGrath =

Justin McGrath can refer to:

- Justin McGrath (Plup), American Super Smash Bros. Melee player
- Justin McGrath (footballer), Australian rules footballer
