= Ty Esler =

Australian rules footballer

Ty Francis Esler

Personal information
- Born: 10 September 1971 (age 55)
- Original team: Lakes Entrance/Koo-wee-rup
- Draft: No. 75, 1988 national draft
- Debut: 1991, Richmond
- Height: 203 cm (6 ft 8 in)
- Weight: 104 kg (229 lb)

Playing career^{1}
Years	Club	Games (Goals)
1991–1993	Richmond	12 (0)
- ^{1} Playing statistics correct to the end of 1993.

Career highlights
- Richmond Under 19s Premiership Player 1989; Richmond Under 19s Best & Fairest 1989

Ty Esler (born 10 September 1971) is a former Australian rules football player who played in the Australian Football League (AFL) between 1991 and 1993 for the Richmond Football Club. He later played for Victorian Football Association club Frankston.
