= Brett Scott =

Australian rules footballer

Personal information
- Born: 10 April 1962 (age 64); Wagga Wagga, New South Wales
- Original team: The Rock-Yerong Creek
- Draft: No. 36, 1989 pre-season draft
- Height: 178 cm (5 ft 10 in)
- Weight: 76 kg (168 lb)
- Position: Centreman

Playing career^{1}
Years	Club	Games (Goals)
1981–1989	South Melbourne/Sydney	59 (44)

Coaching career
Years	Club	Games (W–L–D)
1993	Sydney	2 (0–2–0)
- ^{1} Playing statistics correct to the end of 1989.

Brett Scott (born 10 April 1962) is a former Australian rules footballer who played with the Sydney Football Club in the Victorian Football League during the 1980s.

Scott played his early football with The Rock-Yerong Creek before being recruited to South Melbourne and making his league debut in 1981. The following year the club relocated to Sydney and he took part in the inaugural game for their new city. Injuries restricted his appearances over the years and when he finished in 1989 he had managed just 59 senior games.

After Gary Buckenara was sacked as Sydney's coach in 1993, Scott acted as a caretaker coach for two games.
