= Andrew Ford (Australian footballer) =

Australian rules footballer

Personal information
- Full name: Andrew Ford
- Born: 16 September 1970 (age 56)
- Original team: North Ballarat
- Draft: No. 55, 1988 national draft
- Height: 178 cm (5 ft 10 in)
- Weight: 75 kg (165 lb)

Playing career^{1}
Years	Club	Games (Goals)
1989–1992	Melbourne	8 (1)
- ^{1} Playing statistics correct to the end of 1992.

Andrew Ford (born 16 September 1970) is a former Australian rules footballer who played with Melbourne in the Australian Football League (AFL).

Ford was drafted from North Ballarat. Melbourne selected him with pick 55 in the 1988 National Draft. He played four games in each of his two seasons.
