= Brenton Klaebe =

Australian rules footballer

Personal information
- Full name: Brenton John Klaebe
- Born: 23 October 1966 (age 60); Adelaide, South Australia
- Original teams: Norwood, (SANFL)
- Draft: No. 31, 1988 national draft

Playing career^{1}
Years	Club	Games (Goals)
1986-1990 & 1992-1993	Norwood	61 (9)
1991	Fitzroy	5 (0)
Total		66 (9)
- ^{1} Playing statistics correct to the end of 1993.

Brenton Klaebe (born 23 October 1966) is a former Australian rules footballer who played for Fitzroy in the Australian Football League (AFL) in 1991. He was recruited from the Norwood Football Club in the South Australian National Football League (SANFL) with the 31st selection in the 1988 VFL Draft.
