= Michael James (Australian footballer) =

Australian rules footballer

Personal information
- Full name: Michael James
- Born: 30 December 1971 (age 54)
- Original team: Robinvale/St Pats College
- Draft: No. 96 (F/S), 1988 national draft
- Height: 180 cm (5 ft 11 in)
- Weight: 88 kg (194 lb)
- Position: Centre

Playing career^{1}
Years	Club	Games (Goals)
1989–1991	Carlton	12 (2)
- ^{1} Playing statistics correct to the end of 1991.

Michael James (born 30 December 1971) is a former Australian rules footballer who played with Carlton in the Australian Football League (AFL).

He is the son of Brownlow Medal winner John James.
