= Tony Furey =

Australian rules footballer

Personal information
- Full name: Tony Furey
- Born: 2 August 1963 (age 63)
- Original team: Corpus Christi
- Draft: No. 46, 1989 pre-season draft
- Height: 188 cm (6 ft 2 in)
- Weight: 77 kg (170 lb)
- Position: Forward

Playing career^{1}
Years	Club	Games (Goals)
1983–85	North Melbourne	41 (29)
- ^{1} Playing statistics correct to the end of 1985.

Tony Furey (born 2 August 1963) is a former Australian rules footballer who played with North Melbourne in the Victorian Football League (VFL).
