= Alex McDonald (Australian rules footballer) =

Australian rules footballer

Personal information
- Born: 13 February 1970 (age 56)
- Original team: Ballarat
- Draft: No. 1, 1988 national draft
- Height: 186 cm (6 ft 1 in)
- Weight: 82 kg (181 lb)
- Position: Tagger

Playing career^{1}
Years	Club	Games (Goals)
1990–1995	Hawthorn	46 (24)
1996–1999	Collingwood	61 (20)
Total		107 (44)
- ^{1} Playing statistics correct to the end of 1999.

Alex McDonald (born 13 February 1970) is a former Australian rules footballer who played 107 senior games for Hawthorn (1990–95) and Collingwood (1996–99) in the Australian Football League (AFL). He was the number one draft pick of the 1988 National Draft. He made his debut in round 11 of the 1990 AFL season.
