= Matthew Mahoney (footballer) =

Australian rules footballer

Personal information
- Full name: Matthew Mahoney
- Born: 12 December 1968 (age 57)
- Original team: Eastlake (ACTAFL)
- Draft: No. 69, 1988 national draft
- Height: 200 cm (6 ft 7 in)
- Weight: 94 kg (207 lb)

Playing career^{1}
Years	Club	Games (Goals)
1989–1992	Melbourne	6 (0)
- ^{1} Playing statistics correct to the end of 1992.

Matthew Mahoney (born 12 December 1968) is a former Australian rules footballer who played with Melbourne Football Club in the Australian Football League (AFL).

Mahoney started his career with Eastlake Football Club in the Australian Capital Territory, as a ruckman. He was selected by Melbourne with Pick 69 for the 1988 VFL Draft. He played four games in the 1990 AFL season. His other two appearances both came in the 1992 season. Matthew was known for a long-standing feud with Essendon champion Mark Harvey.
