= Dean Lupson =

Australian rules footballer

Personal information
- Full name: Dean Lupson
- Born: 18 February 1969 (age 57)
- Original team: Essendon reserves
- Draft: No. 45, 1989 pre-season draft
- Height: 180 cm (5 ft 11 in)
- Weight: 79 kg (174 lb)

Playing career^{1}
Years	Club	Games (Goals)
1989–1990	Fitzroy	6 (0)
- ^{1} Playing statistics correct to the end of 1990.

Dean Lupson (born 18 February 1969) is a former Australian rules footballer who played with Fitzroy in the Victorian/Australian Football League (VFL/AFL).

Lupson started his career at Essendon, where he played in the reserves. He went to Fitzroy via the 1989 Pre-season Draft and made three appearances late in the 1989 VFL season. In 1989 he was also a member of Fitzroy's reserves premiership winning team. The following year he played another three senior games.

In the late 1990s, Lupson was playing coach of Sunbury in the Ballarat Football League. They won three successive premierships, from 1997 to 1999, but Lupson didn't play in any of the grand finals. In 1997 he was suspended, in 1998 he was injured with a broken arm and in 1999 he was again absent due to suspension.

Lupson was coach of the Wodonga Raiders Football Club in 2005.

He is now a real estate agent in Beechworth.
