= Paul Payne =

Australian rules footballer

Personal information
- Full name: Paul Payne
- Born: 6 March 1965 (age 61)
- Original team: Tatura
- Draft: No. 40, 1989 pre-season draft
- Height: 188 cm (6 ft 2 in)
- Weight: 82.5 kg (182 lb)
- Position: Defender

Playing career^{1}
Years	Club	Games (Goals)
1985–1988	Melbourne	28 (5)
1989	Carlton	5 (0)
Total		33 (5)
- ^{1} Playing statistics correct to the end of 1989.

Paul Payne (born 6 March 1965) is a former Australian rules footballer who played with Melbourne and Carlton in the Victorian Football League (VFL). Beginning his career with Melbourne, Payne spent four seasons with the Demons before retiring then Carlton convinced him to come out of retirement and he spent one season with the Blues in 1989 before being delisted at the end of the season.
