= Brad Edwards (Australian footballer) =

Australian rules footballer

Personal information
- Full name: Bradley Thomas Edwards
- Born: 22 February 1968 (age 58)
- Original team: Perth (WAFL)
- Draft: No. 17, 1988 national draft
- Height: 190 cm (6 ft 3 in)
- Weight: 95 kg (209 lb)

Playing career^{1}
Years	Club	Games (Goals)
1989	Fitzroy	6 (1)
1990	Brisbane Bears	10 (0)
1991	West Coast	0 (0)
Total		16 (1)
- ^{1} Playing statistics correct to the end of 1990.

Bradley Thomas Edwards (born 22 February 1968) is a former Australian rules footballer who played with Fitzroy and the Brisbane Bears in the Victorian/Australian Football League (VFL/AFL).

Originally from Western Australian Football League (WAFL) club Perth, Edwards was picked up by Fitzroy with their second selection in the 1988 VFL draft. He played six games in 1989 but had a limited impact and at the end of the season made his way to Brisbane through the 1990 pre-season draft.

Edwards played 10 senior games for Brisbane in 1990 before his delisting. He was later drafted by the West Coast Eagles but would make Brisbane his home, becoming a premiership player for Morningside. He continues to be involved in Queensland football as a coach.
