= Robert Teal =

Australian rules footballer

Personal information
- Full name: Robert Teal
- Born: 25 April 1967 (age 59)
- Original teams: Hawthorn City / Hawthorn (VFL)
- Draft: No. 8, 1989 pre-season draft
- Height: 184 cm (6 ft 0 in)
- Weight: 86 kg (190 lb)

Playing career^{1}
Years	Club	Games (Goals)
1989–1990	Sydney Swans	18 (18)
- ^{1} Playing statistics correct to the end of 1990.

Robert Teal (born 25 April 1967) is a former Australian rules footballer who played with the Sydney Swans in the Victorian/Australian Football League (VFL/AFL).

== Career ==
Teal was from Hawthorn City originally and spent four years at the Hawthorn Football Club as a reserves player, unable to break into the senior side which were dominating league football. In 1985 he finished equal second in the Morrish Medal, the VFL Under 19's best and fairest award.

Recruited by Sydney via the 1989 pre-season draft, Teal only had to wait until round three to make his debut, against the West Coast Eagles at the Sydney Cricket Ground. Teal, a half-forward, had 21 disposals and kicked three goals. A regular throughout the season, he finished the year with a 27 disposal and four goal performance at the Melbourne Cricket Ground, in a win over North Melbourne. His VFL career would be short, Teal played just once more for Sydney, late in the 1990 AFL season.
