= Ray Sterrett =

Australian rules footballer

Personal information
- Born: 24 March 1965 (age 61)
- Original team: East Fremantle
- Draft: No. 6, 1988 national draft
- Height: 185 cm (6 ft 1 in)
- Weight: 86 kg (190 lb)

Playing career^{1}
Years	Club	Games (Goals)
1989–1991	Geelong	20 (7)
- ^{1} Playing statistics correct to the end of 1991.

Ray Sterrett (born 24 March 1965) is a former Australian rules footballer who played with Geelong in the Victorian/Australian Football League (VFL/AFL).

Sterrett, who came to Geelong from West Australian Football League club East Fremantle, was the sixth selection in the 1988 National Draft. He didn't have to wait long to make his debut, which came in Geelong's 95 point win over the West Coast Eagles in round two. It would be his only appearance in the 1989 season, but he played 15 games in 1990. In 1991 he played in rounds five to eight, before dropping out of the side with a shoulder injury.
