= Tony Evans (Australian footballer, born 1966) =

Australian rules footballer

Personal information
- Full name: Anthony R. Evans
- Born: 30 January 1966 (age 60); Ballarat, Victoria, Australia
- Original team: East Ballarat
- Draft: No. 35, 1989 pre-season draft
- Height: 180 cm (5 ft 11 in)
- Weight: 76 kg (168 lb)

Playing career^{1}
Years	Club	Games (Goals)
1986–1988	St Kilda	27 (2)
1989	Footscray	3 (1)
Total		30 (3)
- ^{1} Playing statistics correct to the end of 1989.

Anthony Evans (born 30 January 1966) is a former Australian rules footballer who played with St Kilda and Footscray in the Victorian Football League (VFL).

Originally from East Ballarat, Evans began his St Kilda career in 1986, when he played eight games. He made 10 appearances for St Kilda in 1987 and nine in 1988, then went to Footscray via the 1989 Pre-season Draft (pick 35). His time at Footscray was positive but short, Evans was performing outstandingly in the senior team until a reoccurring knee injury ended his time at the bulldogs early in the season. Despite three knee constructions he returned home to East Ballarat, where he won five club best and fairest awards, was a dual premiership player and member of East Ballarat AFL team of the 20th century.

Evans played in Victoria Country master AFL team to win the 2017 (capt) and 2019 national championships, also winning the EJ Whitten national B&F for over 45 and over 50 in those championships.
