= Simon Hose =

Australian rules footballer

Personal information
- Full name: Simon Hose
- Born: 13 April 1967 (age 59)
- Original team: Western Districts
- Draft: No. 30, 1989 pre-season draft
- Height: 179 cm (5 ft 10 in)
- Weight: 81 kg (179 lb)

Playing career^{1}
Years	Club	Games (Goals)
1989	Brisbane Bears	5 (2)
- ^{1} Playing statistics correct to the end of 1989.

Simon Hose (born 13 April 1967) is a former Australian rules footballer who played with the Brisbane Bears in the Victorian Football League (VFL).

Hose caught the eye of VFL recruiters with his performances in the 1986 Teal Cup and was signed by the Sydney Swans. He was never able to break into the seniors and went to Brisbane through the 1989 Pre-season Draft.

His VFL debut finally came in 1989 and was in a win over his former club. He played perhaps his best game for the Bears when they played Footscray at Carrara, kicking two goals from his 22 disposals.
