= Simon Verbeek =

Australian rules footballer

Personal information
- Full name: Simon Verbeek
- Born: 29 March 1967 (age 59)
- Original team: Oakleigh
- Draft: No. 12, 1989 pre-season draft
- Height: 188 cm (6 ft 2 in)
- Weight: 90 kg (198 lb)
- Position: Half forward

Playing career^{1}
Years	Club	Games (Goals)
1989–1991	Carlton	38 (33)
- ^{1} Playing statistics correct to the end of 1991.

Simon Verbeek (born 29 March 1967) is a former Australian rules footballer who played with Carlton in the Australian Football League (AFL).
