= James Pyke (cricketer) =

Australian rules footballer and cricketer

Personal information
- Full name: James Kendrick Pyke
- Born: 7 June 1966 (age 60); Cottesloe, Western Australia
- Batting: Right-handed
- Bowling: Right-arm medium

Domestic team information
- Years: Team
- 1985/86–1987/88: South Australia

Career statistics
Competition	First-class	List A
Matches	13	14
Runs scored	533	465
Batting average	29.61	58.12
100s/50s	0/4	1/3
Top score	77	177
Balls bowled	2,163	508
Wickets	33	12
Bowling average	34.90	29.75
5 wickets in innings	1	0
10 wickets in match	0	0
Best bowling	5/47	3/22
Catches/stumpings	10/–	6/–
- Source: CricketArchive, 24 May 2020

James Kendrick Pyke (born 7 June 1966) is a former Australian sportsman who represented South Australia in Sheffield Shield cricket and also played Australian rules football at a high level. As well as competing for Norwood in the South Australian National Football League (SANFL), Pyke was twice drafted to the Victorian Football League (VFL), although he never played a senior game.

== Early life ==
Pyke was born in Western Australia but spent his early childhood in North America. His father, Frank Pyke, was a footballer for Perth in the West Australian Football League and an academic, who moved with his wife and son to the United States in December 1966 to study at Indiana University. While in the United States, Pyke's brother, Don, was born. Don Pyke would later play in two premiership sides with the West Coast Eagles. Before returning to Australia in 1972, the family also spent time in Normal, Illinois, and Halifax, Nova Scotia.

== Career ==
Pyke spent the early 1980s in the Australian Capital Territory and played Under-16, Under-19 and senior cricket for the territory. As a 17-year-old, Pyke played a match for the ACT First XI against the touring West Indian cricket team at Manuka Oval. He was dismissed by Guyanese international cricketer Roger Harper for nine runs.

In the 1984–85 season, Pyke toured India and Sri Lanka with the Australia Under-19 cricket team, which featured future internationals Tom Moody, Paul Reiffel and Gavin Robertson. He played three "Tests" against India and one more in Sri Lanka, as a top order batsman and part-time bowler. Easily the team's best performer during the "Tests", Pyke scored 544 runs at 136.00. In the opening "Test", against India's Under 19s in Delhi, Pyke came in at six in the first innings and scored 201 not out. For the rest of the tour, Pyke opened the batting for Australia and scored another century in Patna.

Now playing in South Australia, Pyke played for the state's Colts team until making his Sheffield Shield debut in February 1986. He won the Don Bradman Medal for his efforts at West Torrens in the 1985–86 season.

On the football field he was also putting in good performances for Norwood and was selected by Footscray in the 1986 VFL Draft, with the 45th selection.

Having just broken into the South Australian cricket team, Pyke opted to keep playing cricket and appeared in eight of their 10 matches in the 1986/87 Shield season. He was also a member of South Australia's McDonald's Cup winning side that summer and at the end of the season joined the team in a tour of New Zealand. In the second List A fixture against the Ian Smith led Central Districts, at Fitzherbert Park in Palmerston North, Pyke scored 177 off 159 balls with five sixes. This bettered his previous best limited overs score of just 19 and set a record for the highest individual innings for a List A match in New Zealand. The record remained until 2007, when Matthew Hayden scored an unbeaten 181 in a One Day International. It was the highest limited overs score by a South Australian until 2015.

Pyke, who now works as a physiotherapist, played his last match for South Australia in 1988. He continued playing football with Norwood and in the 1989 Pre-season Draft was again recruited to the VFL, selected by Collingwood with the 25th selection. He never played a senior league game for Collingwood.
