= Justin McGrath (footballer) =

Australian rules footballer

Personal information
- Full name: Justin McGrath
- Born: 5 December 1970 (age 55)
- Original teams: Ballarat YCW, (BFL)
- Draft: No. 56, 1988 national draft

Playing career^{1}
Years	Club	Games (Goals)
1991	Fitzroy	8 (0)
- ^{1} Playing statistics correct to the end of 1991.

Justin McGrath (born 5 December 1970) is a former Australian rules footballer who played for Fitzroy in the Australian Football League (AFL) in 1991.

He was recruited to Hawthorn from Ballarat YCW in the Ballarat Football League (BFL) with the 56th selection in the 1988 VFL Draft, but did not play a senior game for them. Fitzroy then selected him with the 9th selection in the 1991 Pre-season Draft, and he played eight games for the Lions in 1991.
