= Paul Holdsworth =

Australian rules footballer

Personal information
- Full name: Paul Holdsworth
- Born: 17 February 1970 (age 56)
- Original teams: Clarence, (TFL)
- Draft: No. 22, 1988 national draft

Playing career^{1}
Years	Club	Games (Goals)
1989	Sydney	6 (3)
- ^{1} Playing statistics correct to the end of 1989.

Paul Holdsworth (born 17 February 1970) is a former Australian rules footballer who played six games for the Sydney in the Victorian Football League (VFL) in 1989. He was recruited from the Clarence Football Club in the Tasmanian Football League (TFL) with the 22nd selection in the 1988 VFL Draft.
