= Danny Craven =

Former Australian rules footballer

Personal information
- Full name: Danny Craven
- Born: 3 May 1967 (age 59)
- Original teams: Chiltern, Wangaratta
- Draft: No. 15, 1988 national draft
- Height: 162 cm (5 ft 4 in)
- Weight: 68 kg (150 lb)

Playing career^{1}
Years	Club	Games (Goals)
1989 & 1991–1992	St Kilda	33 (10)
1993–1995	Brisbane Bears	25 (7)
Total		58 (17)
- ^{1} Playing statistics correct to the end of 1995.

Danny Craven (born 3 May 1967) is a former Australian rules footballer who played with St Kilda and the Brisbane Bears in the Victorian/Australian Football League (VFL/AFL).

Playing as a rover, Craven, played in the opening four fixtures of the 1989 VFL season, before breaking his leg in St Kilda's round five game against Essendon at Windy Hill. He not only missed the rest of the year but also didn't play a senior game in 1990. A rover, he returned for 1991 AFL season and averaged 20 disposals from his 18 appearances.

He left St Kilda at the end of the 1992 AFL season and was taken at number 78 in the Pre-Season Draft by the Brisbane Bears. In three seasons Craven played 25 games for Brisbane, 15 of which came in 1994.

Remaining in Queensland after his AFL career ended, Craven coached West Brisbane to the 1996 QAFL premiership, in his first season as a senior coach. He captained the Brisbane Lions reserves in 1998 and also served as an assistant coach. The following year Craven was Craig Brittain's assistant at North Brisbane. In 2002, his second year as coach of Mount Gravatt, he steered the club to their maiden AFL Queensland State League premiership. Craven accepted a role in 2016 to coach the Mayne Australian Football Club in the QFA North Competition

Nicknamed "Chippa", Craven is currently an AFL commentator for the National Indigenous Radio Service (NIRS).
