= Michael Werner (footballer) =

Australian rules footballer (born 1969)

Personal information
- Full name: Michael Werner
- Born: 10 June 1969 (age 57); Canberra, ACT
- Original team: Eastlake (ACT AFL)
- Draft: No. 9, 1988 national draft
- Height: 188 cm (6 ft 2 in)
- Weight: 88 kg (194 lb)
- Position: Key forward

Playing career^{1}
Years	Club	Games (Goals)
1989–92	Essendon	40 (60)
1993–94	Sydney Swans	20 (20)
Total		60 (80)
- ^{1} Playing statistics correct to the end of 1994.

Michael Werner (born 10 June 1969) is a former Australian rules footballer who played for Essendon and the Sydney Swans in the Australian Football League (AFL).

The Canberra-born Werner started his junior career at ACT AFL club Eastlake before transferring to neighbouring club Manuka-Weston. He spent the 1988 season in the SANFL as a full-forward with West Torrens and kicked 38 goals to finish as their leading goal kicker. In 1988 he also represented the ACT at the Adelaide Bicentennial Carnival.

Essendon then secured his services with pick nine in the 1988 VFL draft and he went on to spend the next four seasons as a key forward in the AFL. He kicked 27 goals in 1990 but missed that year's finals series where Essendon made the Grand Final. In 1991 he made just six senior appearances but notably kicked four goals in Essendon's Elimination Final loss to Melbourne.

At the end of the 1992 season, Werner was traded to Sydney. In his first game against his old club, and third for Sydney, Werner kicked a career best six goals.

He later played with Gisborne and kicked a record 173 goals in the 1997 Riddell District Football League season.
