= Colin Alexander =

Australian rules footballer

Personal information
- Full name: Colin Alexander
- Born: 12 April 1970 (age 56)
- Original team: Clarence
- Draft: No. 25, 1988 national draft
- Height: 178 cm (5 ft 10 in)
- Weight: 74 kg (163 lb)
- Position: Forward

Playing career^{1}
Years	Club	Games (Goals)
1989–1991	Collingwood	24 (28)
1992–1993	Brisbane Bears	5 (2)
Total		29 (30)
- ^{1} Playing statistics correct to the end of 1993.

Career highlights
- Harry Collier Trophy 1989

Colin Alexander (12 April 1970) is a former Australian rules footballer who was recruited from the Clarence Football Club in Tasmania to play in the Victorian Football League. He played 24 games for Collingwood between 1989 and 1991, and after a lack of opportunities and injuries at Collingwood, he moved to the Brisbane Bears and played five games from 1992 to 1993. His best VFL/AFL season was his debut season, 1989. He played 14 games and kicked 18 goals, with his best game being a career high four goals in a round 6 match against Melbourne at the MCG. Due to injuries his career was shortened but he would later return to the Clarence Football Club and star in the Tasmanian Football League for many years in the mid to late 1990s. Alexander also played 1 senior game for the Glenorchy Football Club in the Tasmanian Football League.
