= 1988 VFL draft =

Draft for the Victorian Football League

The 1988 VFL draft, held on 9 November 1988, was the third annual national draft held by the Victorian Football League (now known as the Australian Football League). It consisted of a pre-season draft and a national draft.

In 1988 there were 112 picks to be drafted between 14 teams in the national draft. The Hawthorn Football Club received the first pick in the national draft, after receiving it from St Kilda in the first ever trade involving draft picks, in return for Paul Harding, Peter Russo and Robert Handley.

== Pre-draft selections ==
Pick	Player	Drafted to	Recruited from	League	Games with new team
1	Stevan Jackson	West Coast	South Fremantle	WAFL	38
2	Don Pyke	West Coast	Claremont	WAFL	132
3	Peter Sumich	West Coast	South Fremantle	WAFL	150
4	Craig Turley	West Coast	West Perth	WAFL	115
5	Scott Watters	West Coast	South Fremantle	WAFL	46

== 1988 national draft ==
Round	Pick	Player	Drafted to	Recruited from	League	Games with new team
1	1	Alex McDonald	Hawthorn	Ballarat	Ballarat Football League (BFL)	46
1	2	Todd Breman	West Coast	Subiaco	Western Australian Football League (WAFL)	23
1	3	Carl Dilena	Fitzroy	Sturt	South Australian National Football League (SANFL)	23
1	4	John McNamara	North Melbourne	Port Fairy	Hampden Football League (HFL)	0
1	5	Chris Naish	Richmond	Wangaratta	Ovens & Murray Football League (O&MFL)	143
1	6	Ray Sterrett	Geelong	East Fremantle	WAFL	20
1	7	Leon Cameron	Footscray	South Warrnambool	HFL	172
1	8	Dion Scott	Sydney	Devonport	North West Football Union (NWFU)	6
1	9	Michael Werner	Essendon	West Torrens	SANFL	40
1	10	Peter Higgins	West Coast	Claremont	WAFL	4
1	11	Mark Bayliss	Collingwood	South Fremantle	WAFL	4
1	12	Brad Fox	Essendon	Perth	WAFL	17
1	13	Darren Bennett	Melbourne	East Fremantle	WAFL	4
1	14	Stephen Byers	Hawthorn	New Norfolk	Tasmanian Football League (TFL)	0
2	15	Danny Craven	St Kilda	Wangaratta	O&MFL	33
2	16	David Bain	Brisbane Bears	East Perth	WAFL	86
2	17	Brad Edwards	Fitzroy	Perth	WAFL	6
2	18	Anthony Stevens	North Melbourne	Shepparton	Goulburn Valley Football League (GVFL)	292
2	19	Matthew Francis	Richmond	Ballan	Central Highlands Football League (CHFL)	19
2	20	Adrian Fletcher	Geelong	Glenorchy	TFL	23
2	21	Anthony Reynolds	Footscray	Wodonga	O&MFL	0
2	22	Paul Holdsworth	Sydney	Clarence	TFL	6
2	23	Michael Long	Essendon	St Mary's	Northern Territory Football League (NTFL)	190
2	24	David Hynes	West Coast	Port Adelaide	SANFL	73
2	25	Colin Alexander	Collingwood	Clarence	TFL	24
2	26	David Regan	Essendon	East Ballarat	Ballarat FL	0
2	27	Rod Keogh	Melbourne	Castlemaine	Bendigo Football League (BFL)	22
2	28	Chris Martin	Hawthorn	Seymour	GVFL	0
3	29	Tim Allen	St Kilda	Mornington	Mornington Peninsula Football League (MPFL)	22
3	30	Richard Champion	Brisbane Bears	Woodville	SANFL	183
3	31	Brenton Klaebe	Fitzroy	Norwood	SANFL	5
3	32	Brad Sholl	North Melbourne	Horsham	Wimmera Football League (WFL)	2
3	33	Bruce Lennon	Richmond	Sturt	SANFL	28
3	34	Daryn Cresswell	Geelong	Glenorchy	TFL	0
3	35	John Georgiades	Footscray	Subiaco	WAFL	15
3	36	Nick Chigwidden	Sydney	Glenelg	SANFL	0
3	37	Michael Strickland	Essendon	Glenorchy	TFL	0
3	38	Jeremy Crough	West Coast	South Bendigo	Bendigo FL	0
3	39	Scott Russell	Collingwood	Sturt	SANFL	182
3	40	Glen Johnston	Carlton	North Launceston	TFL	0
3	41	Michael Hobbes	Melbourne	Eastlake	Australian Capital Territory Australian Football League (ACTAFL)	0
3	42	Dion Rhook	Hawthorn	Hamilton Imperials	Western Border Football League (WBFL)	0
4	43	Daryl Griffiths	St Kilda	North Launceston	TFL	0
4	44	Scott Williamson	West Coast	Wangaratta Rovers	O&MFL	0
4	45	Damian Simmonds	Fitzroy	Wangaratta	O&MFL	0
4	46	Simon McCarthy	North Melbourne	Rochester	GVFL	0
4	47	Glen Leaf	Richmond	Mildura Imperials	Sunraysia Football League (SFL)	0
4	48	Scott Jordon	Fitzroy	South Launceston	TFL	0
4	49	Shannon Corcoran	Footscray	Glenelg	SANFL	23
4	50	Jim West	Sydney	Glenelg	SANFL	37
4	51	Adrian Burns	Essendon	Dromana	MPFL	11
4	52	Darren Bartsch	West Coast	West Adelaide	SANFL	0
4	53	Michael Smith	Collingwood	Devonport	TFL	0
4	54	Michael Sexton	Carlton	Sandhurst	Bendigo FL	200
4	55	Andrew Ford	Melbourne	North Ballarat	Ballarat FL	8
4	56	Justin McGrath	Hawthorn	Ballarat	Ballarat FL	0
5	57	Pat Lambert	St Kilda	Manangatang	Northern Mallee Football League (NMFL)	0
5	58	Lachlan Sim	Brisbane Bears	Moe	Gippsland Football League (GFL)	21
5	59	Matthew Dundas	Fitzroy	Assumption College		73
5	60	Derek Kickett	North Melbourne	Central District	SANFL	12
5	61	Julian Moloney	Richmond	Mildura Imperials	SFL	0
5	62	David Welsby	Geelong	Sturt	SANFL	2
5	63	Scott Davies	Footscray	North Launceston	TFL	0
5	64	Andrew Bishop	Sydney	Ainslie	ACTAFL	0
5	65	Rod Saunders	Essendon	Mooroopna	GVFL	0
5	66	Matt Richardson	West Coast	Warracknabeal	Wimmera Football League (WFL)	0
5	67	Peter Divenuto	Collingwood	Sandy Bay	TFL	0
5	68	Grant Povey	Carlton	Claremont	WAFL	0
5	69	Matthew Mahoney	Melbourne	Eastlake	ACTAFL	6
5	70	Russell Wilding	Hawthorn	Lexton	Lexton Football League (LFL)	0
6	71	Graeme Kettle	St Kilda	South Launceston	TFL	0
6	72	Chris O'Sullivan	Brisbane Bears	Cora Lynn	West Gippsland Football League (WGFL)	8
6	73	Stephen Walker	Fitzroy	North Hobart	TFL	0
6	74	Steven Hamilton	North Melbourne	North Adelaide	SANFL	6
6	75	Ty Esler	Richmond	Koo-Wee-Rup	West Gippsland Football League (WGFL)	12
6	76	David Preston	Geelong	Bairnsdale	GL	0
6	77	Robert Bloom	Footscray	Ulverstone	Northern Tasmanian Football League (NTFL)	0
6	78	Jamie Bond	Hawthorn	Beaufort	Ballarat FL	0
6	79	Simon Jorgensen	Essendon	Castlemaine	Bendigo FL	0
6	80	Damian Berto	West Coast	St Mary's	NTFL	0
6	81	Nick Probert	Collingwood	Burnie Hawks	TFL	0
6	82	Anthony Loone	Carlton	Deloraine	Northern Tasmanian FL	0
6	83	Brian Stynes	Melbourne	Ballyboden St Enda's GAA	Ireland	2
6	84	Justin Crough	Hawthorn	Bungaree	CHFL	0
7	85	Ian Dargie	St Kilda	Subiaco	WAFL	10
7	86	Ben Sexton	Footscray	Sandhurst	Bendigo FL	39
7	87	Dwaine Kretschmer	Fitzroy	North Gambier	WBFL	0
7	88	Justin Staritski	North Melbourne	Norwood	SANFL	25
7	89	Adam Crudden	Richmond	Nar Nar Goon	West Gippsland Football League (WGFL)	0
7	90	Kym Nicholls	Geelong	Norwood	SANFL	0
7	91	Matthew Queen	Footscray	Glenorchy	TFL	0
7	92	Stephen Vizy	North Melbourne	Queanbeyan	ACTAFL	0
7	93	Paul Hills	Essendon	North Ballarat	Ballarat FL	63
7	94	Andrew Geddes	West Coast	Mornington	MPFL	0
7	95	Tony Francis	Collingwood	Norwood	SANFL	142
7	96 (F/S)	Michael James	Carlton	Ballarat	Ballarat FL	12
7	97	Tom Grehan	Melbourne	Roscommon	Ireland	0
7	98	Michael Barrett	Hawthorn	Morwell Tigers	Gippsland League	0
8	99	Dermot McNicholl	St Kilda	Derry	Ireland	3
8	100	David Kupsch	Brisbane Bears	North Adelaide	SANFL	0
8	101	Leigh Funcke	Fitzroy	Minyip	WFL	0
8	102	Shaun Holloway	North Melbourne	Ballarat	Ballarat FL	0
8	103 (F/S)	Sean Bowden	Richmond	Mildura Imperials	SFL	6
8	104	Andrew Gribble	Geelong	St Peters	Geelong Football League (GFL)	0
8	105	Chris Grant	Footscray	Daylesford	CHFL	341
8	106	Gareth John	Sydney	Gisborne	Riddell District Football League (RDFL)	21
8	107	Darren Mead	Essendon	Port Adelaide	SANFL	0
8	108	Peter Melesso	West Coast	Claremont	WAFL	6
8	109 (F/S)	Heath Shephard	Collingwood	Robinvale	SFL	11
8	110 (F/S)	Chris Mulcair	Carlton	Bendigo	Bendigo FL	0
8	111 (F/S)	Tom Kavanagh	Melbourne	Castlemaine	Bendigo FL	2
8	112	Troy Reid	Hawthorn	Woorinen	Mid-Murray Football League (MMFL)	0

== 1989 pre-season draft ==
Round	Player	Drafted to	Recruited from	League	Games with new team
1	Brian Winton	St Kilda	Essendon	VFL	5
2	John Gastev	Brisbane Bears	West Coast	VFL	113
3	Wally Matera	West Coast	Fitzroy	VFL	32
4	Travis Martin-Beynon	North Melbourne	Southport	Queensland Australian Football League (QAFL)	0
5	Jeremy Crough	Richmond	West Coast	VFL	0
6	Andrew Rogers	Geelong	Essendon	VFL	75
7	Mark Williams	Footscray	Carlton	VFL	14
8	Robert Teal	Sydney	Hawthorn	VFL	18
9	Brian Hinkley	Essendon	Geelong	VFL	0
10	Shane Cable	West Coast	Perth	Western Australian Football League (WAFL)	1
11	Murray Wrensted	Collingwood	West Coast	VFL	10
12	Simon Verbeek	Carlton	Richmond	VFL	38
13	Dannie Seow	Melbourne	Collingwood	VFL	7
14	Mathew Shinners	Hawthorn	Hawthorn	VFL	0
15	Brendan Lowther	St Kilda	Carlton	VFL	0
16	David Wittey	Brisbane Bears	St Kilda	VFL	0
17	Kevin Caton	Fitzroy	West Coast	VFL	9
18	Leigh Tudor	North Melbourne	North Melbourne	VFL	8
19	Matt Richardson	Richmond	West Coast	VFL	0
20	Spiro Malakellis	Geelong	Geelong	VFL	67
21	Tim Harrington	Footscray	Collingwood	VFL	18
22	Darren Ogier	Sydney	North Melbourne	VFL	8
23	Paul McWilliam	Essendon	Sturt	South Australian National Football League (SANFL)	0
24	Clinton Browning	West Coast	East Fremantle	WAFL	4
25	James Pyke	Collingwood	Norwood	SANFL	0
26	Ashley Matthews	Carlton	Carlton	VFL	9
27	James Tomkins	Melbourne	Melbourne	VFL	0
28	Jon Gahan	Hawthorn	Hawthorn	VFL	0
29	Tony Elshaug	St Kilda	Collingwood	VFL	0
30	Simon Hose	Brisbane Bears	Sydney	VFL	5
31	Peter Bourke	Fitzroy	Essendon	VFL	22
32	Chris Lindsay	North Melbourne	West Torrens	SANFL	0
33	Stuart Griffiths	Richmond	Old Melbournians	Victorian Amateur Football Association (VAFA)	17
34	Darren Savickas	Geelong	Geelong	VFL	0
35	Tony Evans	Footscray	St Kilda	VFL	3
36	Brett Scott	Sydney	Sydney	VFL	7
37	Rodney Lawson	Essendon	Kalkee	Horsham District Football League (HDFL)	0
38	Shane Ellis	West Coast	East Fremantle	WAFL	10
39	John McKay	Collingwood	Old Xaverians	VAFA	0
40	Paul Payne	Carlton	Melbourne	VFL	5
41	Michael Atkins	Melbourne	Footscray	VFL	0
42	Brett Sherriff	Hawthorn	Hawthorn	VFL	0
43	Lazar Vidovic	St Kilda	Castlemaine	Bendigo Football League (BFL)	80
44	Glen Reeves	Brisbane Bears	Hawthorn	VFL	0
45	Dean Lupson	Fitzroy	Essendon	VFL	6
46	Tony Furey	North Melbourne	North Melbourne	VFL	0
47	Justin Paul	Richmond	Richmond	VFL	0
48	Garry Phillips	Geelong	Old Haileyburians	VAFA	3
49	Jolyon Keeble	Footscray	Hawthorn	VFL	0
50	Michael Phyland	Sydney	Sydney	VFL	13
51	Gary Barrow	Essendon	Essendon	VFL	0
52	Richard Geary	West Coast	South Fremantle	WAFL	2
53	Nick Foley	Collingwood	Narrandera	Riverina Football League (RFL)	0
54	Tim Taylor	Carlton	Therry	VAFA	0
55	Matthew Febey	Melbourne	Melbourne	VFL	0
56	Adam Ladbroke	Hawthorn	Brisbane Bears	VFL	0
