= Darren Ogier =

Australian rules footballer

Personal information
- Full name: Darren Ogier
- Born: 2 February 1963 (age 63)
- Original team: Hadfield
- Draft: No. 22, 1989 pre-season draft
- Height: 184 cm (6 ft 0 in)
- Weight: 81 kg (179 lb)

Playing career^{1}
Years	Club	Games (Goals)
1985–1987	Carlton	13 (15)
1988	North Melbourne	2 (3)
1989	Sydney Swans	8 (16)
Total		23 (34)
- ^{1} Playing statistics correct to the end of 1989.

Darren Ogier (born 2 February 1963) is a former Australian rules footballer who played with Carlton, North Melbourne and the Sydney Swans in the Victorian Football League (VFL).

Ogier was a product of Carlton's Under 19s and also spent spend a period of time in the reserves, before making his senior debut as a 22-year-old in 1985. A fast leading forward, he was selected for a total of just five games in 1985 and 1986 but made eight appearances in 1987, a premiership year.

He joined North Melbourne in 1988 but got even fewer opportunities, playing just two games, one of which was against his former club.

Ogier was reunited in 1989 with Col Kinnear, his assistant coach at Carlton and the new senior coach of Sydney. He came into the side midway through the season and kicked 16 goals from eight appearances. Nine of those goals came in his final two games, first kicking five goals against Footscray and then booting four more against the West Coast Eagles the following week.

In 1991, while living in England, he guided the Earls Court Kangaroos to the British Australian Rules Football League premiership.

He was an assistant coach at the Northern Bullants from 1998 to 2001 and served as the senior coach of Katamatite in 2006. The following year he joined the Murray Bushrangers, of the TAC Cup, as an assistant coach and was promoted to senior coach for the 2010 season.
