= Ashley Matthews =

Australian rules footballer

Personal information
- Full name: Ashley Matthews
- Born: 26 November 1969 (age 56)
- Original team: Lilydale (EDFL)
- Draft: No. 26, 1989 pre-season draft
- Height: 190 cm (6 ft 3 in)
- Weight: 79 kg (174 lb)

Playing career^{1}
| Years | Club | Games (Goals) |
| 1989–1991 | Carlton | 9 (3) |
| 1992–1993 | Fitzroy | 6 (1) |
| Total | | 15 (4) |
- ^{1} Playing statistics correct to the end of 1993.

Ashley Matthews (born 26 November 1969) is a former Australian rules footballer who played for the Carlton Football Club and Fitzroy Football Club in the Victorian Football League (VFL). He was recruited from Lilydale in the Eastern Districts Football League (EDFL).

When he finished his VFL career Matthews returned to grass roots football including to Lilydale as its captain and coach. He coached Lilydale to a premiership in 1996 in the EDFL and again in 1998 this time in the Eastern Football League (EFL) both in the second division of the competition.

Although he coached Lilydale in first division in 1997 they were not competitive and were immediately relegated.

Matthews also has been Chairman of Selectors at the club when working with coach Brett Fisher in 2006 and 2007 in the first division of the EFL.

Matthews is also member of the club's "Team of the Century" as coach.

In 2016, Matthews coached the East Ringwood U13A team to the EFL U13 premiership.
