= Brad Fox =

Australian rules footballer

Personal information
- Full name: Bradley Fox
- Born: 9 October 1969 (age 57)
- Original team: Perth (WAFL)
- Draft: No. 12, 1988 national draft
- Height: 185 cm (6 ft 1 in)
- Weight: 92 kg (203 lb)

Playing career^{1}
Years	Club	Games (Goals)
1991–1992	Essendon	17 (4)
1993	Richmond	4 (0)
Total		21 (4)
- ^{1} Playing statistics correct to the end of 1993.

Bradley Fox (born 9 October 1969) is a former Australian rules footballer who played with Essendon and Richmond in the Australian Football League (AFL) and Perth in the West Australian Football League (WAFL).

Fox played in the Teal Cup for Western Australia in 1986 and played 15 senior games for Perth in 1998 before he was drafted by Essendon with the 12th selection in the 1988 VFL Draft. He didn't make his debut for Essendon until 1991, when he played 10 games In the opening round of the 1992 season he was involved in an altercation with Tony Lockett, during which he was choked to near unconsciousness from a headlock.

At the end of the 1992 season he was delisted by Essendon, but was re-signed by them in the 1993 Pre-season draft. However, he didn't play again for Essendon before he was again delisted and recruited by Richmond in the 1993 Mid-year draft. He played four games for Richmond before again being delisted from the AFL for the final time.

He later played for the Gisborne Football Club.
