= Dannie Seow =

Australian rules footballer

Personal information
- Full name: Daniel Seow
- Born: 2 April 1967 (age 59); Singapore
- Original team: Montmorency (DVFL)
- Draft: No. 13, 1989 pre-season draft
- Height: 188 cm (6 ft 2 in)
- Weight: 80 kg (176 lb)

Playing career^{1}
Years	Club	Games (Goals)
1986–1987	Collingwood	18 (8)
1989–1990	Melbourne	7 (2)
Total		25 (10)
- ^{1} Playing statistics correct to the end of 1990.

Daniel "Dannie" Seow (born 2 April 1967) is a former Australian rules footballer who played with Collingwood and Melbourne in the Victorian Football League (VFL).

== Biography ==
Seow is of Chinese descent on his father's side.

A former Melbourne Under 19s player, Seow broke into the seniors in 1986 and played 14 games that year. His season ended prematurely when he was suspended for striking Michael Pickering. He appeared four times in 1987 and spent the following year in the United States, where he trialed as a wide receiver for the University of North Carolina. When he returned to Australia, Melbourne secured his services via the 1989 Pre-season Draft. He made seven appearances for Melbourne, five in 1989 and two in 1990.

Sometime after his football career ended, Seow moved to Shanghai. He then moved Washington, D.C., where he was player/coach of the D.C. Eagles of the United States Australian Football League. He now resides in Colorado, where he is head coach of the Centennial Tigers.
