= Warwick Angus =

Australian rules footballer

Personal information
- Full name: Warwick Angus
- Born: 14 July 1969 (age 57)
- Original team: Glen Waverley Hawks
- Height: 194 cm (6 ft 4 in)
- Weight: 92 kg (203 lb)

Playing career^{1}
| Years | Club | Games (Goals) |
| 1989–1991 | North Melbourne | 13 (3) |
- ^{1} Playing statistics correct to the end of 1991.

Warwick Angus (born 14 July 1969) is a former Australian rules footballer who represented the North Melbourne Football Club in the Victorian Football League/Australian Football League (VFL/AFL) between 1989 and 1991.

Angus spent 3 years at North in which he played in 13 games, kicking 3 goals, before leaving the game in 1991. He was the last man to wear jumper number 11 at North before Shinboner of the Century Glenn Archer debuted the next year.
