= Brian Winton =

Australian rules footballer

Personal information
- Full name: Brian J. Winton
- Born: 28 July 1963 (age 63)
- Original team: Wentworth (SFL)
- Draft: No. 1, 1989 pre-season draft
- Height: 192 cm (6 ft 4 in)
- Weight: 83 kg (183 lb)

Playing career^{1}
Years	Club	Games (Goals)
1983	Richmond	10 (3)
1984–1988	Essendon	32 (4)
1989	St Kilda	5 (4)
Total		47 (11)
- ^{1} Playing statistics correct to the end of 1989.

Brian J. Winton (born 28 July 1963) is a former Australian rules footballer who played with Richmond, Essendon and St Kilda in the Victorian Football League (VFL).

Originally from Sunraysia Football League (SFL) club Wentworth, Winton was a gifted forward in his youth, topping the goal-kicking in the 1982 VFL Under-19s competition. Making his senior VFL debut in 1983, Winton was used mostly as a defender and crossed to Essendon in 1984.

Essendon won premierships in 1984 and 1985 and as a result Winton played only three games in his first two seasons. After another brief season in 1986, Winton played 20 of a possible 22 games in the 1987 VFL season, playing as a full-back. When Essendon were unable to satisfy his salary expectations, he was released by the club and signed by St Kilda, with the first pick of the pre-season draft.

Although he kicked three goals on his St Kilda debut, against the Brisbane Bears, Winton played just four more league games. He then played for both Prahran and Sandringham in the Victorian Football Association, followed by a stint as coach of Cheltenham from 1996 to 1999 .
