= Tom Kavanagh =

Australian rules footballer (born 1970)

Personal information
- Full name: Tom Kavanagh
- Born: 21 April 1970 (age 56)
- Original team: Castlemaine (BFL)
- Draft: No. 111 (F/S), 1988 national draft
- Height: 188 cm (6 ft 2 in)
- Weight: 82 kg (181 lb)

Playing career^{1}
Years	Club	Games (Goals)
1989	Melbourne	2 (1)
1993–1994	Fitzroy	8 (1)
Total		10 (2)
- ^{1} Playing statistics correct to the end of 1994.

Tom Kavanagh (born 21 April 1970) is a former Australian rules footballer who played with Melbourne and Fitzroy in the Victorian/Australian Football League (VFL/AFL).

The son of four-time VFL premiership player Brent Crosswell, Kavanagh played for Bendigo Football League club Castlemaine before Melbourne drafted him under the AFLs Father–son rule in 1988.

Kavanagh played two senior games for Melbourne in 1989 before returning to Castlemaine Football Club. His ongoing good form led to Fitzroy selecting him with pick 22 in the 1993 Mid-Season Draft.

Kavanagh played 8 games for Fitzroy throughout the 1993 and 1994 seasons before being delisted at the end of 1994.
