= Michael O'Connell (footballer) =

Australian rules footballer

Personal information
- Full name: Michael Bryant O'Connell
- Born: 17 January 1962 (age 64)
- Original team: Claremont
- Height: 190 cm (6 ft 3 in)
- Weight: 86 kg (190 lb)

Playing career^{1}
Years	Club	Games (Goals)
1982–1988	Claremont	92 (38)
1987–1988	West Coast Eagles	20 (13)
Total		112 (51)
- ^{1} Playing statistics correct to the end of 1988.

Michael Bryant O'Connell (born 17 January 1962) is a former Australian rules footballer who played with the West Coast Eagles in the Victorian Football League (VFL).

O'Connell made his WAFL debut for Claremont in 1982 and suffered a broken leg during the season. A defender, he was a member of the West Coast Eagles inaugural VFL squad in 1987 and made 10 appearances that year. In the opening round of the 1988 season, against Geelong at Kardinia Park, O'Connell was pushed forward and kicked a match winning five goal haul.

Although they never played a senior game together, O'Connell's brother David also played for the Eagles in 1988. Their father is former Claremont and Geelong footballer, John O'Connell. His nephew, John Williams, currently plays at Essendon.
