= Paul Harding (Australian rules footballer) =

Australian rules footballer

Personal information
- Full name: Paul Sidney Harding
- Born: 4 June 1964 (age 62); Camborne, Cornwall, England
- Original team: East Fremantle (WAFL)
- Height: 193 cm (6 ft 4 in)
- Weight: 98 kg (216 lb)

Playing career^{1}
Years	Club	Games (Goals)
1981–1986, 1992, 1994–1996	East Fremantle	136 (54) (Note: These tallies refer to premiership matches (home-and-away and finals matches) only.)
1987–1988	Hawthorn	11 (2)
1989–1991	St Kilda	62 (7)
1992–1994	West Coast	43 (5)
Total		252 (68)

Representative team honours
Years	Team	Games (Goals)
1983–1991	Western Australia	10 (0)
- ^{1} Playing statistics correct to the end of 1994.

Career highlights
- West Coast premiership side 1992; East Fremantle best and fairest 1986; East Fremantle premiership side 1985 & 1994; Simpson Medal: 1991

Paul Sidney Harding (born 4 June 1964) is a former Australian rules footballer who played with Hawthorn, St. Kilda and West Coast in the VFL/AFL.

Paul was a player for East Fremantle, with whom he began during a bleak period in 1981 and rose startlingly to play for his state in 1983 almost on his nineteenth birthday, and is also remembered at many junior clubs.

Harding usually played as a ruckman and was a member of the West Australian interstate team which won the national title in the season of his interstate debut. He was recruited from East Fremantle to Hawthorn for the 1987 VFL season but struggled to make the side regularly due to injuries. Alongside Peter Russo and Robert Handley, Harding was traded to St. Kilda in exchange for the first choice in the 1988 VFL Draft. Harding would play 62 games for the Saints over three seasons. He continued to represent Western Australia and in 1991 won a Simpson Medal for his performance against the Victorians.

West Coast acquired the services of Harding in 1992, and he played in their inaugural Grand Final winning side that year. After leaving West Coast, he finished his career at East Fremantle, finishing with 136 premiership games for the club, including premierships in 1985 and 1994, and a total of 252 premiership games in elite Australian rules football.

After retiring as a footballer, he worked at the Fremantle Dockers. When Matthew Pavlich first came to Western Australia, he lived with Paul Harding and his family. Pavlich lived there for a while before buying his own property.

Paul Harding is now a dental technician.
