= Peter Melesso =

Australian rules footballer

Personal information
- Full name: Peter Melesso
- Born: 30 November 1961 (age 64)
- Original team: South Districts
- Draft: No. 108, 1988 national draft
- Height: 191 cm (6 ft 3 in)
- Weight: 83 kg (13 st 1 lb)

Playing career^{1}
Years	Club	Games (Goals)
1981	South Melbourne	1 (0)
1983–1985	St Kilda	7 (0)
1987–1989	Claremont	57 (91)
1989–1990	West Coast	6 (4)
1990, 1992	East Perth	17 (25)
Total		88 (120)
- ^{1} Playing statistics correct to the end of 1992.

Career highlights
- Claremont premiership side 1987, 1989

Peter Neil Melesso (born 30 November 1961) is a former Australian rules footballer who played with South Melbourne, St Kilda and the West Coast Eagles in the Victorian/Australian Football League (VFL/AFL).

A South Districts recruit, Melesso managed just one senior appearance for South Melbourne, which came in the final home and away round of the 1981 VFL season. He played seven games in three seasons with St Kilda then ended up with Claremont in the WAFL, where he became a mainstay of a champion team under Gerard Neesham and three times (Note: He kicked behinds after the siren to draw with Subiaco in 1987 and with Swan Districts in 1988 plus a goal after the siren to beat South Fremantle in 1987.) produced memorable kicks to save the Tigers from defeat. The West Coast Eagles gave him another chance at VFL level when they selected him with the 108th pick of the 1988 VFL Draft.

Melesso, a key position player, was diagnosed with lymphatic cancer during the 1990 season and didn't play for the club again. He had moved to East Perth for that season, and would make an unsuccessful comeback two seasons later.

In 2005, Melesso was called up as a witness in the manslaughter trial of Melbourne bouncer Zdravko Micevic. Melesso had been working in the bottle shop of the Beaconsfield Hotel in St Kilda where Micevic was accused of an assault which resulted in the death of cricketer David Hookes.
