= David O'Connell (footballer) =

Australian rules footballer

Personal information
- Full name: David O'Connell
- Born: 22 June 1963 (age 63)
- Original team: Claremont
- Height: 193 cm (6 ft 4 in)
- Weight: 89 kg (196 lb)

Playing career^{1}
Years	Club	Games (Goals)
1984–1990	Claremont	107 (123)
1988–1990	West Coast Eagles	27 (6)
1991–1992	Fitzroy	21 (13)
Total		155 (142)
- ^{1} Playing statistics correct to the end of 1992.

David O'Connell (born 22 June 1963) is a former Australian rules footballer who played with the West Coast Eagles and Fitzroy in the Victorian/Australian Football League (VFL/AFL).

A Western Australian interstate representative, O'Connell played most of his football as a ruckman and forward. He came from a footballing family and started out at Claremont, his father John's club, before joining brother Michael at the West Coast Eagles. O'Connell had his best season in 1989 when he put together 18 games and had the second most hit-outs by an Eagles player behind Phil Scott.

At the end of the 1990 season he was traded to Fitzroy, along with teammate Joe Cormack, in return for Dale Kickett. During his two season with Fitzroy, O'Connell supported John Ironmonger in the ruck.
