= Tim Harrington (footballer) =

Australian rules footballer

Personal information
- Full name: Tim Harrington
- Born: 19 September 1963 (age 63)
- Original team: Oak Park
- Draft: No. 21, 1989 pre-season draft
- Height: 188 cm (6 ft 2 in)
- Weight: 84 kg (185 lb)

Playing career^{1}
Years	Club	Games (Goals)
1984–1986	North Melbourne	20 (2)
1987	Collingwood	8 (0)
1989–1990	Footscray	18 (0)
Total		46 (2)
- ^{1} Playing statistics correct to the end of 1990.

Tim Harrington (born 19 September 1963) is a former Australian rules footballer who played with North Melbourne, Collingwood and Footscray in the Victorian/Australian Football League (VFL/AFL).

A defender, used mostly as a full-back, Harrington came to North Melbourne from Oak Park. He played 20 games over three seasons with North Melbourne and then ended his career with stints at Collingwood and Footscray.

Footscray hired him as an assistant coach in 1992 and he remained with the club for three years. From 1995 to 2001 he was an assistant coach to Denis Pagan at North Melbourne, during which time they won two premierships. He was then North Melbourne's Football Manager for five years. In 2007 he was made List Manager of North Melbourne and two years later moved over to Melbourne, where he worked until 2013.

Personal life

Following his playing career, Tim and his wife Tricia, had three children, Nicholas, Benjamin and Lucinda. All three of Tim and Tricia’s children are known to be talented musicians in the Melbourne music scene.
