= Stuart Griffiths (footballer) =

Australian rules footballer (born 1969)

Personal information
- Born: 31 January 1969 (age 57)
- Original team: Old Melburnians
- Draft: No. 33, 1989 pre-season draft
- Height: 177 cm (5 ft 10 in)
- Weight: 76 kg (168 lb)

Playing career^{1}
Years	Club	Games (Goals)
1989–1992	Richmond	17 (14)
- ^{1} Playing statistics correct to the end of 1992.

Stuart Griffiths (born 31 January 1969) is a former Australian rules footballer who played with Richmond in the Victorian/Australian Football League (VFL/AFL).

Griffiths, who played originally for Old Melburnians in the Victorian Football Association, was picked up by Richmond in the 1989 Pre-season Draft. He made eight appearances in the 1989 VFL season, which included a strong debut performance, against Footscray at the MCG, where he had 20 disposals and kicked three goals. A rover, Griffiths didn't play a senior game in 1990 and played only the opening two rounds of the 1991 season. He made seven appearances in 1992, but was delisted at the end of the year.
