= Mark Bayliss =

Australian rules footballer

Personal information
- Full name: Mark James Bayliss
- Born: 12 December 1965 (age 60)
- Original team: South Fremantle (WAFL)
- Draft: No. 11, 1988 national draft

Playing career^{1}
Years	Club	Games (Goals)
1989	Collingwood	4 (6)
- ^{1} Playing statistics correct to the end of 1989.

Mark James Bayliss (born 12 December 1965) is a former Australian rules footballer in the Australian Football League.

Bayliss was recruited from the WAFL club South Fremantle by Collingwood with their first-round draft pick in the 1988 National Draft. He played as the second string key forward behind Coleman Medallist Brian Taylor and only played in four games.
