= Laurie Keene =

Australian rules footballer (born 1961)

Personal information
- Full name: Lawrence Kimberley Brett Keene
- Born: 2 January 1961 (age 65)
- Original team: Karrinyup
- Debut: Round 1, 1987, West Coast vs. Richmond, at Subiaco Oval
- Height: 202 cm (6 ft 8 in)
- Weight: 95 kg (209 lb)

Playing career^{1}
Years	Club	Games (Goals)
1981–90, 1994	Subiaco	141 (251)
1987–1990	West Coast	36 (38)
Total		177 (289)

Representative team honours
Years	Team	Games (Goals)
1984–1986	Western Australia	4 (5)
- ^{1} Playing statistics correct to the end of 1990.

Career highlights
- All-Australian team 1986; Subiaco premiership player 1986 & 1988; West Coast's first goal kicker in the VFL/AFL

Lawrence Kimberley Brett "Laurie" Keene (born 2 January 1961) is a former Australian rules footballer who played for the West Coast Eagles in the VFL/AFL.

Tall and athletic, Laurie Keene was recruited to West Coast from Subiaco, where he had been a member of premiership sides in 1986 and 1988. He could play as a key position forward or in the ruck and had topped Subiaco's goalkicking in 1985 with 70 goals as well as winning their 'Fairest and best' award in 1986. He kicked West Coast's first goal (and score) in VFL/AFL football.

His career at West Coast was often interrupted by injury, most notably an Achilles tendon injury which ended his VFL/AFL career, but he had a solid debut season with 25 goals, which included a then club record haul of six against Carlton at Princes Park.

Keene returned to Subiaco after his stint at West Coast and played with the club until 1994, amassing 141 games.

At interstate level, he was a regular Western Australia representative, and earned selection to the All-Australian team at the 1986 State of Origin Carnival. He is mostly remembered by West Coast fans for kicking West Coast's first ever goal.
