= Clinton Browning =

Australian rules footballer

Personal information
- Full name: Clinton Leon Browning
- Born: 3 July 1962 (age 64)
- Original team: Mingenew
- Draft: No. 24, 1989 pre-season draft
- Height: 191 cm (6 ft 3 in)
- Weight: 85 kg (187 lb)

Playing career^{1}
Years	Club	Games (Goals)
1981–93	East Fremantle	219 (380)
1989	West Coast	4 (5)
Total		223 (385)
- ^{1} Playing statistics correct to the end of 1993.

Clinton Leon Browning (born 3 July 1962) is a former Australian rules footballer who played for the West Coast Eagles in the Victorian Football League (VFL) and East Fremantle in the West Australian Football League (WAFL).

Browning was a versatile key position player from Mingenew and started out at East Fremantle as a full-forward. A Lynn Medalist in 1984, he was easily the most prominent forward in the 1985 WAFL Grand Final, with six goals, to help East Fremantle defeat Subiaco. The following year, Browning was recruited to Hawthorn but could not break into the team and returned home.

Despite being aged 27, Browning was signed by West Coast in 1989 and finally got his chance to play VFL football. He had just eight disposals on debut against North Melbourne but kicked two goals the following round against Brisbane at Carrara. After playing in a loss to Fitzroy, Browning didn't return for five weeks, when he kicked two goals at Subiaco Oval against Collingwood.

After being delisted, he continued his WAFL career but mostly in the new role of full-back, a position in which he starred in the 1992 premiership team and won the Simpson Medal. He represented Western Australia at interstate football on three occasions.
