= Peter Higgins (footballer) =

Australian rules footballer

Personal information
- Full name: Peter Higgins
- Born: 11 October 1966 (age 60)
- Original team: Claremont (WAFL)
- Draft: No. 10, 1988 national draft
- Height: 198 cm (6 ft 6 in)
- Weight: 90 kg (198 lb)

Playing career^{1}
Years	Club	Games (Goals)
1987-1990 & 1993	Claremont	59 (21)
1989	West Coast Eagles	4 (0)
1991	East Fremantle	21 (2)
Total		84 (23)
- ^{1} Playing statistics correct to the end of 1993.

Peter Higgins (born 11 October 1966) is a former Australian rules footballer who played with the West Coast Eagles in the Victorian Football League (VFL).

Higgins played at both under-19s and reserves level with the Carlton Football Club but didn't make an appearance in the seniors. A ruckman, he joined Western Australian Football League (WAFL) club Claremont in 1987 in search of greater opportunities and participated in their WAFL premiership team that year.

He was picked up by West Coast with the 10th pick of the 1988 VFL draft and had 28 hit-outs on debut, against Collingwood. After just one season and four games, Higgins was de-listed by the club.

Following a good season for Claremont, Higgins was redrafted by West Coast in the 1991 AFL pre-season draft but played in the WAFL throughout 1991 and was again de-listed by West Coast.
