= Ian Dargie =

Australian rules footballer

Personal information
- Full name: Ian Malcolm Dargie
- Born: 15 November 1963 (age 62); England
- Original team: Sorrento JFC
- Draft: No. 85, 1988 national draft
- Height: 178 cm (5 ft 10 in)
- Weight: 72 kg (159 lb)

Playing career
Years	Club	Games (Goals)
1986–1988, 1990–1994	Subiaco	131 (?)
1989–1990	St Kilda	10 (1)
1991	West Coast Eagles	1 (0)
1995–1998	Southport	

Career highlights
- Subiaco premiership player 1986, 1988; Sandover Medal 1991, 1994; Subiaco best and fairest 1994; Subiaco life member 2000; Southport premiership player 1997, 1998

Ian Malcolm Dargie (born 15 November 1963) is a former Australian rules footballer who played for St Kilda and West Coast in the Australian Football League (AFL) and Subiaco in the West Australian Football League (WAFL) during the 1980s and 1990s.

== Biography ==
Dargie was born in England before emigrating to Australia as a child.

== Playing career ==
Dargie began playing football for Sorrento Junior Football Club, later playing for Karrinyup Junior Football Club. After three years with North Beach in the Western Australian Amateur Football League he joined Subiaco. After making his league debut at the start of the 1986 WAFL season, he played in three straight WAFL grand finals, winning premierships in 1986 and 1988.

Dargie was picked up by St Kilda at pick 85 in the 1988 VFL Draft and made his debut the following season in the Saints' Round 16 match against the Brisbane Bears. In 1990 he moved back to his home state of Western Australia and joined the West Coast Eagles but managed just one game and spent most of the season playing with Subiaco. His performances for Subiaco were so impressive that he won a Sandover Medal the following year, in the process breaking the longest-ever Sandover "drought" by any WA(N)FL club dating back half a century to the legendary Haydn Bunton senior. In 1994 Dargie won the award again to join Bunton senior as the only players from the Lions to win it twice.

In 1995 Dargie joined Southport in the Queensland Australian Football League. In three seasons in Queensland he played in two premierships.
