= Robert Handley =

Australian rules footballer

Personal information
- Full name: Robert Handley
- Born: 8 January 1965 (age 61)
- Original team: Hill End
- Height: 183 cm (6 ft 0 in)
- Weight: 76 kg (168 lb)
- Position: Wingman

Playing career^{1}
Years	Club	Games (Goals)
1985–87	Hawthorn	23 (18)
1989	St Kilda	4 (2)
Total		27 (20)
- ^{1} Playing statistics correct to the end of 1989.

Robert 'Chopper' Handley (born 8 January 1965) is a former Australian rules footballer who played for Hawthorn and St Kilda in the Victorian Football League (VFL) during the late 1980s.

Recruited before drafting was imposed on all clubs, Handley was from Hawthorn's Gippsland zone and his junior club was Hill End. He progressed his was through the under 19's and reserves. Handley, who could play both as a wingman and on the ball, debuted with Hawthorn in 1985 and finished the year in their losing Grand Final team. He struggled to hold his place in a strong Hawthorn side the following two seasons and left the club to play for Central District Football Club in the South Australian National Football League (SANFL) in 1988. After one year he returned to Melbourne and signed on with St Kilda, with whom he could only manage four senior appearances. He finished his career back in South Australia at Central District, playing 135 games and topping their goal-kicking in 1992 with 40 goals.

He was also a talented soccer player, playing in the youth teams of the Morwell Falcons and, after his VFL career was completed, playing in the Latrobe Valley Soccer League for Morwell Dinamo.
