= Murray Wrensted =

Australian rules footballer

Personal information
- Full name: Murray Robert Wrensted
- Born: 26 August 1964 (age 62); Geraldton, Western Australia
- Original team: East Fremantle (WAFL)
- Draft: No. 11, 1989 pre-season draft
- Height: 174 cm (5 ft 9 in)
- Weight: 85 kg (187 lb)

Playing career^{1}
Years	Club	Games (Goals)
1983–1987	East Fremantle	94 (72)
1987–1988	West Coast	29 (12)
1989	Collingwood	10 (4)
Total		133 (88)
- ^{1} Playing statistics correct to the end of 1989.

Murray Robert Wrensted (born 26 August 1964) is a former Australian rules footballer who played for the West Coast Eagles and Collingwood in the Victorian Football League (VFL).

Wrensted started his career with Geraldton Railways before being recruited by West Australian Football League club East Fremantle (whose country zone he was in) for the first six matches of 1983. He was successful enough that the newly christened "Sharks" signed Wrensted to a permanent contract after five matches. Wrensted improved steadily and had his best season in 1985, winning a Sandover Medal with a record tally of votes and ending the year by playing in a premiership side.

A centreman, Wrensted joined West Coast in 1987 for their inaugural VFL season. In 1988 the club made the finals for the first time and in the Elimination Final against Melbourne Wrensted had a chance to win the game with just seconds remaining but his shot from 40 metres out on the run drifted wide and they lost by two points. He moved to Victoria in 1989 where he finished his VFL career with a season at Collingwood.
