= Shane Cable =

Australian rules footballer

Personal information
- Full name: Shane Thomas Cable
- Born: 21 February 1970 (age 56)
- Original team: Perth
- Draft: No. 10, 1989 pre-season draft
- Height: 180 cm (5 ft 11 in)
- Weight: 67 kg (148 lb)

Playing career^{1}
Years	Club	Games (Goals)
1989	West Coast Eagles	1 (0)
- ^{1} Playing statistics correct to the end of 1989.

Shane Thomas Cable (born 21 February 1970) is a former Australian rules footballer who played with the West Coast Eagles in the Victorian Football League (VFL).

== Football career ==
Cable, a Noongar man, is the son of Barry Cable. He made just one appearance with West Coast, at the WACA Ground in a win over Footscray where he had seven disposals. A wingman, he had initially been listed as an emergency but was named in the team after Chris Waterman was omitted for being late to a team meeting.

He played for Perth at WAFL level and represented the Indigenous All-Stars in 1994. In both 1993 and 1995 he topped the goal-kicking lists at Perth. Ten seasons later, he stood in for one match as coach of East Perth when regular Royals coach Warren Mahony was so ill due to a flu epidemic that he could not speak.

In 2004, Cable launched an Australian rules football magazine, Westside Football, covering the AFL and WAFL.

== Post-football career ==
Cable worked for mining company Rio Tinto. In 2016, he was appointed CEO of Indigenous Construction Resource Group (ICRG), an indigenous contractor set up to create job opportunities in the resources sector for regional Aboriginal communities. ICRG went into liquidation in May 2019. Cable later co-owned Resource Operations and Maintenance Services.
