= Richard Geary =

Australian rules footballer

Personal information
- Full name: Richard Geary
- Born: 24 September 1963 (age 63); Melbourne
- Original team: Mitcham
- Draft: No. 52, 1989 pre-season draft
- Height: 181 cm (5 ft 11 in)
- Weight: 78 kg (172 lb)

Playing career^{1}
Years	Club	Games (Goals)
1985–1986	Richmond	18 (10)
1988-1989	South Fremantle	37 (81)
1989	West Coast Eagles	2 (0)
Total		57 (91)
- ^{1} Playing statistics correct to the end of 1989.

Richard Geary (born 24 September 1963) is a former Australian rules footballer who played with Richmond and the West Coast Eagles in the Victorian Football League (VFL).

Geary came from Mitcham and played Under-19s football with Fitzroy. He transferred to Richmond without playing a senior game and made his VFL debut with his new club in 1985. A wingman and half forward, Geary spent two seasons playing for Richmond.

The West Coast Eagles later secured his services but he made just two appearances. He however performed well for WAFL club South Fremantle by topping their goal-kicking in the 1989 season, which ended in a Grand Final loss to Claremont.
