= Shane Ellis =

Australian rules footballer

Personal information
- Full name: Shane Gregory Ellis
- Born: 27 September 1960 (age 66)
- Draft: No. 38, 1989 pre-season draft
- Height: 188 cm (6 ft 2 in)
- Weight: 86 kg (190 lb)

Playing career^{1}
Years	Club	Games (Goals)
1980–1991	East Fremantle	204 (50)
1989	West Coast	10 (8)
Total		214 (58)

Representative team honours^{2}
Years	Team	Games (Goals)
1982–1986	Western Australia	5
- ^{1} Playing statistics correct to the end of 1991.^{2} Representative statistics correct as of 1986.

Shane Gregory Ellis (born 27 September 1960) is a former Australian rules footballer who played with the West Coast Eagles in the Victorian Football League (VFL) and East Fremantle in the West Australian Football League (WAFL).

Ellis won East Fremantle's 'Fairest and Best' award in 1982 and twice played in losing Grand Finals with the WAFL club, in 1984 and 1986. The year in between, Ellis had spent with Essendon but hadn't been able to break into the seniors.

A half back, he got another opportunity to play in the VFL when he was signed by West Coast. He appeared in the first six games for the 1989 VFL season, during which time he kicked three goals in a game against Sydney at the SCG. Ellis played four further games that year and finished his career back at East Fremantle where he brought up his 200th game before retiring in 1991. He represented Western Australia at interstate football on five occasions between 1982 and 1986.

Ellis, who resides in Perth, is now a sports teacher at Leeming Senior High School where he has worked for many years.
