= Stevan Jackson =

Australian rules footballer (born 1970)

Personal information
- Full name: Stevan Jackson
- Born: 9 March 1970 (age 56)
- Draft: No. 1, 1988 pre-draft selection
- Height: 192 cm (6 ft 4 in)
- Weight: 93 kg (205 lb)

Playing career^{1}
Years	Club	Games (Goals)
1988-1991, 1995	South Fremantle	41 (96)
1989–1991	West Coast	38 (68)
1992–1993	Richmond	21 (30)
Total		100 (194)

Representative team honours^{2}
Years	Team	Games (Goals)
1989	Western Australia	1 (3)
- ^{1} Playing statistics correct to the end of 1993.^{2} Representative statistics correct as of 1989.

Stevan Jackson (born 9 March 1970) is a former Australian rules footballer who played for the West Coast Eagles and Richmond in the Australian Football League.

== Playing career ==
Jackson began his senior playing career with South Fremantle where he played 41 West Australian Football League matches.

In the 1988 VFL Draft, Jackson was a pre-draft selection by the West Coast Eagles

== Coaching career ==
After retiring, Jackson took up coaching with Blackburn in the Eastern Football League. He has since had stints with Wantirna South, South Mandurah and Warnbro.
