= 1987 West Coast Eagles season =

West Coast Eagles
1987 season
- President: Richard Colless
- Coach: Ron Alexander
- Captain(s): Ross Glendinning
- Home ground: Subiaco Oval; WACA Ground
- National Panasonic Cup: semi-finals
- VFL season: 8th
- Finals series: N/A
- Best & Fairest: Steve Malaxos
- Leading goalkicker: Ross Glendinning (38 goals)
- Highest home attendance: 38,274 (round 10 vs Collingwood at Subiaco Oval)
- Lowest home attendance: 13,540 (round 13 vs Fitzroy at WACA Ground)
- Average home attendance: 24,276

The 1987 VFL season was the West Coast Eagles' inaugural season in the Victorian Football League (VFL). The club was introduced to the competition as part of the VFL's expansion. Ron Alexander was appointed coach of the team and Ross Glendinning was appointed captain. The Eagles played 22 games, winning 11 and losing 11 to finish 8th on the ladder.

== List ==
=== Squad ===
West Coast Eagles inaugural squad
Senior list			Coaching staff
1 Wally Matera; 2 Robert Wiley; 3 Chris Mainwaring; 4 Ross Glendinning (c); 5 Dwayne Lamb; 6 Geoff Miles; 7 Phil Narkle; 8 Steve Malaxos; 9 Glenn O'Loughlin; 10 Dean Turner; 11 Peter Davidson; 12 Phil Scott; 14 Michael Brennan	15 Dean Laidley; 16 John Annear; 18 Andrew Macnish; 19 Darren Bennett; 20 Paul Peos; 21 David O'Connell; 22 Michael O'Connell; 23 Glen Bartlett; 24 John Worsfold; 25 Laurie Keene; 26 Alex Ishchenko; 27 Mark Zanotti	28 Chris Lewis; 30 John Gastev; 32 Murray Wrensted; 33 Don Holmes; 34 Sean King; 35 Dean Warwick; 36 David Hart; 37 Paul Mifka; 38 Adrian Barich; 45 Andrew Lockyer	Head coach: Ron Alexander; Assistant coach: Barry Cable (senior assistant); Legend: (c) Captain(s); (vc) Vice-captain(s); Long-term injury list; Upgraded rookie; Updated: 28 June 2011; Source(s): Eagles Flying High

== Pre-season ==
=== National Panasonic Cup ===
West Coast played their first match against another AFL club during the 1987 National Panasonic Cup, the VFL's night series at the time, defeating Footscray by 29 points at Waverley Park after trailing by 28 points at three-quarter time.

Home team's score listed in bold:

Round	Date	Score	Opponent	Opponent's Score	Result	Venue	Attendance
1	Tuesday, 3 March 2:10pm	12.15 (87)	Footscray	**8.10 (58)**	Won by 29 points	Waverley Park	4,599
2	Saturday, 21 March 2:10pm	12.15 (87)	Fitzroy	**10.4 (64)**	Won by 23 points	Waverley Park	5,047
SF	Tuesday, 14 April 2:10pm	5.10 (40)	Essendon	**22.16 (148)**	Lost by 108 points	Waverley Park	12 625

== Regular season ==
Home team's score listed in bold:

Round	Date	Score	Opponent	Opponent's Score	Result	Venue	Attendance	Best on ground	Team
1	Sunday, 29 March 2:10pm	**20.13 (133)**	Richmond	16.23 (119)	Won by 14 points	Subiaco Oval	23,897	Phil Narkle	West Coast
2	Saturday, 4 April 2:10pm	17.12 (114)	Essendon	**17.17 (119)**	Lost by 5 points	Windy Hill	19,845	Leon Baker	Essendon
3	Sunday, 12 April 2:10pm	**14.13 (97)**	Sydney	18.16 (124)	Lost by 27 points	Subiaco Oval	35,719	Greg Williams	Sydney
4	Saturday, 18 April 2:10pm	15.14 (104)	Carlton	**29.17 (191)**	Lost by 87 points	Princes Park	20,750	Paul Meldrum	Carlton
5	Saturday, 25 April 2:10pm	15.14 (104)	Hawthorn	**13.14 (92)**	Won by 12 points	Princes Park	10,588	Chris Mainwaring	West Coast
6	Sunday, 3 May 2:10pm	**24.18 (162)**	North Melbourne	13.10 (88)	Won by 74 points	Subiaco Oval	28,543	Robert Wiley	West Coast
7	Friday, 8 May 7:40pm	**10.21 (81)**	Brisbane Bears	8.14 (62)	Won by 19 points	WACA Ground	25,799	Ross Glendinning	West Coast
8	Saturday, 16 May 2:10pm	6.13 (49)	St Kilda	**14.13 (97)**	Lost by 48 points	Moorabbin Oval	11,537	Warren Jones	St Kilda
9	Sunday, 24 May 7:40pm	**20.15 (135)**	Melbourne	18.11 (119)	Won by 16 points	Subiaco Oval	23,366	Dwayne Lamb	West Coast
10	Monday, 1 June 2:10pm	**19.23 (137)**	Collingwood	11.14 (80)	Won by 57 points	Subiaco Oval	38,274	John Annear	West Coast
11	Saturday, 6 June 2:10pm	15.9 (99)	Footscray	**18.13 (121)**	Lost by 22 points	Western Oval	15,089	Brian Royal	Footscray
12	Saturday, 13 June 2:10pm	12.13 (85)	Geelong	**13.13 (91)**	Lost by 6 points	Kardinia Park	17,504	Bruce Lindner	Geelong
13	Friday, 19 June 7:40pm	**16.18 (114)**	Fitzroy	5.12 (42)	Won by 72 points	WACA Ground	13,540	John Annear	West Coast
14	Sunday, 27 June 2:10pm	9.15 (69)	Richmond	**9.19 (73)**	Lost by 4 points	Melbourne Cricket Ground	8,926	Allan McKellar	Richmond
15	Friday, 3 July 7:40pm	**18.10 (118)**	Essendon	21.20 (146)	Lost by 28 points	WACA Ground	15,740	Paul Salmon	Essendon
16	Friday, 10 July 7:40pm	**15.17 (107)**	Carlton	15.14 (104)	Won by 3 points	WACA Ground	21,780	Ross Glendinning	West Coast
17	Sunday, 19 July 2:10pm	10.11 (71)	Sydney	**30.21 (201)**	Lost by 130 points	Sydney Cricket Ground	24,199	Stephen Wright	Sydney
18	Sunday, 2 August 2:10pm	**17.13 (115)**	Hawthorn	17.12 (114)	Won by 1 point	Subiaco Oval	24,502	John Platten	Hawthorn
19	Friday, 7 August 7:40pm	**15.19 (109)**	North Melbourne	18.12 (120)	Lost by 11 points	WACA Ground	22,540	Jim Krakouer	North Melbourne
20	Sunday, 16 August 2:10pm	21.14 (140)	Brisbane Bears	**18.11 (119)**	Won by 21 points	Carrara Stadium	4,859	Geoff Raines	Brisbane Bears
21	Friday, 21 August 7:40pm	10.8 (68)	Melbourne	**18.21 (129)**	Lost by 61 points	Melbourne Cricket Ground	21,048	Sean Wight	Melbourne
22	Sunday, 30 August 2:10pm	**26.19 (175)**	St Kilda	13.9 (87)	Won by 88 points	Subiaco Oval	17,617	Adrian Barich	West Coast

Source: AFLTables

== Ladder ==
**(P)**	Premiers
	Qualified for finals

#	Team	P	W	L	D	PF	PA	%	Pts
1	Carlton **(P)**	22	18	4	0	2599	1883	138.0	72
2	Hawthorn	22	17	5	0	2781	1891	147.1	68
3	Sydney	22	15	7	0	2846	2197	129.5	60
4	North Melbourne	22	13	8	1	2402	2417	99.4	54
5	Melbourne	22	12	10	0	2189	2026	108.0	48
6	Geelong	22	11	10	1	2355	2348	100.3	46
7	Footscray	22	11	10	1	1959	2046	95.7	46
8	West Coast	22	11	11	0	2386	2438	97.9	44
9	Essendon	22	9	12	1	2075	2318	89.5	38
10	St Kilda	22	9	13	0	2150	2369	90.8	36
11	Fitzroy	22	8	14	0	2328	2544	91.5	32
12	Collingwood	22	7	15	0	1853	2425	76.4	28
13	Brisbane Bears	22	6	16	0	2113	2666	79.3	24
14	Richmond	22	5	17	0	2199	2667	82.5	20

Rules for classification: 1. premiership points; 2. percentage; 3. points for
Average score: 104.7
Source: AFL Tables

== Awards ==
Steve Malaxos won the inaugural Club Champion Award, polling 229 votes to finish ahead of Ross Glendinning and Chris Mainwaring:

1987 Club Champion Award
No.	Name	Votes
1	Steve Malaxos	229
2	Ross Glendinning	170
3	Chris Mainwaring	166
4	Dwayne Lamb	128
5	Alex Ishchenko	116
6	Laurie Keene	115
7	Michael Brennan	113
8	Chris Lewis	88
9	Murray Wrensted	75
10	John Annear	70

Glen Bartlett won the award for Best Clubman and Chris Mainwaring was named Rookie of the Year.
