= Matera (surname) =

Matera is a surname. Notable people with the surname include:

- Antonio Matera (born 1996), Italian footballer
- Barbara Matera (politician) (born 1981), Italian politician
- Brandon Matera (born 1992), Australian rules footballer
- Dary Matera (born 1955), American writer
- Douglas Matera (born 1993), Brazilian Paralympic swimmer
- Fran Matera (1924–2012), American comic strip artist
- Lia Matera (born 1952), Canadian author
- Pablo Matera (born 1993), Argentine rugby union player
- Peter Matera (born 1969), Australian rules footballer
- Phillip Matera (born 1975), Australian rules footballer
- Wally Matera (born 1963), Australian rules footballer
