= List of South Fremantle footballers who have also played in the VFL/AFL =

In the recent history of WAFL club South Fremantle Football Club, over 100 footballers have been recruited or drafted to VFL/AFL clubs and have won numerous accolades at the elite level. This list only counts footballers who played at least game at senior VFL/AFL level and who were recruited / drafted from South Fremantle.

== South Fremantle footballers at VFL/AFL clubs except West Coast & Fremantle ==
Club	Player(s)	Time at club	Games (Goals)	Notable achievements
Adelaide	Stephen Rowe	1991–1995	29 (24)	
Brisbane Bears/Brisbane Lions	Brad Hardie	1987–1991	101 (192)	First Brisbane Bears player to reach 100 VFL/AFL games
Carlton	Jon Dorotich	1986–1993	132 (103)	VFL Premiership 1987
Collingwood	Stan Magro; James Clement	1977–1982; 2001–2007	96 (19); 146 (13)	2× All-Australian (2004, 2005)
Essendon	Dean Rioli	1999–2006	100 (91)	
Fitzroy				
Footscray/Western Bulldogs	Brad Hardie	1985–1986	47 (28)	Brownlow Medal 1985
Geelong	Mark Bairstow; Tim Kelly	1987–89, 1991–94; 2018–2019	146 (172); 48 (48)	3× All-Australian (1987, 1991, 1992); All-Australian 2019
Gold Coast	Brandon Matera	2011–2017	101 (124)	
Greater Western Sydney	Cameron McCarthy	2014–2016	21 (36)	
Hawthorn	Mark Williams	2002–2009	111 (242)	AFL Premiership 2008
Melbourne	Damien Gaspar	1995–1998	29 (0)	
North Melbourne	Peter Bell	1996–2000	123 (120)	2× AFL Premiership (1996, 1999), All-Australian 1999
Port Adelaide	Jacob Surjan; Billy Frampton	2004–2012; 2018–2019	121 (17); 3 (4)	
Richmond	Bruce Monteath; Maurice Rioli; Darren Gaspar	1975–1980; 1982–1987; 1996–2007	118 (198); 118 (80); 207 (22)	All-Australian 1979, VFL Premiership 1980; Norm Smith Medal (1982), 2× All-Australian (1983, 1986); 2× All-Australian (2000, 2001)
South Melbourne/Sydney	Scott Watters	1993–1994	37 (11)	
St Kilda	Nicky Winmar; Clinton Jones	1987–1998; 2007–2014	230 (283); 149 (40)	2× All-Australian (1991, 1995)
sources: South Fremantle Football Club 2020 Yearbook, p. 43; VFL/AFL Players from South Fremantle - Draftguru

== West Coast representatives ==
- Wally Matera, 1987–1988: 24 games, 26 goals
- John Worsfold, 1987–1998: 209 games, 37 goals — 2× AFL Premiership (1992, 1994)
- Peter Sumich, 1989–1997: 150 games, 514 goals — 2× AFL Premiership (1992, 1994)
- Scott Watters, 1989–1992: 46 games, 13 goals
- Peter Matera, 1990–2003: 257 games, 213 goals — Norm Smith Medal 1992, 2× AFL Premiership (1992, 1994), 5× All-Australian (1991, 1993, 1994, 1996, 1997)
- Glen Jakovich, 1991–2004: 276 games, 60 goals — 2× AFL Premiership (1992, 1994), 2× All-Australian (1994, 1995)
- Phillip Matera, 1996–2005: 179 games, 389 goals — All Australian (2003)

== Fremantle representatives ==
- Peter Bell, 1995, 2001–08: 163 games, 130 goals — All-Australian 2003
- Scott Watters, 1995–1997: 26 games, 6 goals
- James Clement, 1996–2000: 84 games, 38 goals
- Clem Michael, 1998–2002: 43 games, 11 goals
- Roger Hayden, 2002–2011: 128 games, 14 goals
- Paul Duffield, 2006–2015: 171 games, 33 goals
- Cameron McCarthy, 2017–2020: 49 games, 63 goals
