= John McIntosh (footballer, born 1943) =

Australian rules footballer (1943–2021)

Personal information
- Full name: John David McIntosh
- Born: 1 November 1943
- Died: 16 October 2021 (aged 77)
- Original team: Beverley
- Height: 191 cm (6 ft 3 in)
- Weight: 94 kg (207 lb)
- Position: Ruckman

Playing career^{1}
Years	Club	Games (Goals)
1962–69	Claremont	146 (131)
1970–72	St Kilda	51 (29)
Total		197 (160)

Representative team honours
Years	Team	Games (Goals)
1963–69	Western Australia	18 (12)
1971	Victoria	1 (0)
Total		19 (12)
- ^{1} Playing statistics correct to the end of 1972.

Career highlights
- Claremont premiership side 1964; Simpson Medal 1966 (interstate); All-Australian team 1966, 1969; Claremont best and fairest 1966, 1969; 2nd Brownlow Medal 1971

John David McIntosh (1 November 1943 – 16 October 2021) was an Australian rules footballer who played for the Claremont Football Club in the West Australian Football League (WAFL) and the St Kilda Football Club in the Victorian Football League (VFL). Originally from Beverley, Western Australia, McIntosh also played 19 interstate matches, 18 for Western Australia and one for Victoria. He retired after four games of the 1972 VFL season due to a knee injury originally sustained in the 1971 VFL second semi-final.

== Career ==
McIntosh was a ruckman and played with Claremont from 1962 to 1969, winning their best and fairest award twice. He represented Western Australia 18 times at interstate football and was All Australian in 1966 and 1969. In the 1966 Hobart Carnival, he was awarded the Simpson Medal. He was a key member to their 1964 WANFL premiership win over East Fremantle; a year later, he finished third in the 1965 Sandover Medal behind Barry Cable and eventual winner Bill Walker.

In 1970, he was lured to Victoria to join St Kilda and had an outstanding debut season, finishing equal 5th in the Brownlow Medal count. In 1971, he finished equal 2nd, missing out on the Brownlow by three votes to former Saints teammate Ian Stewart, then playing with Richmond. In the 1971 semi-final against Hawthorn, he badly injured his left knee and was unable to play in the Grand Final. Further damage to his knee in the fourth game of the 1972 season saw him announce his retirement from football at the age of 28.

McIntosh averaged 0.77 Brownlow medal votes per VFL game over the course of his career, which, as of the conclusion of the 2022 AFL season, places him 16th on the all-time list for players who polled more than 30 votes. Only three Western Australian players in history have averaged more votes per game in the VFL. In 2004, he was inducted into the WA Football Hall of Fame.

== Post-football ==
Following his retirement from football he was a pennant tennis player, enjoyed fishing and later took up lawn bowls for the Dalkeith Nedlands Bowling Club, winning numerous club championship events as well as a state title.

John McIntosh died on 16 October 2021 after being diagnosed with leukemia in 2020.

== Family ==
McIntosh married Gwenda Don, a former winner of the Western Australian state singles tennis championships. His sons, Nathan and Ashley McIntosh, both played senior WAFL football, while Ashley is a former defender for the West Coast Eagles who played in two AFL premierships; and his daughter, Karlene, also represented Western Australia in state tennis.
