= Glenn O'Loughlin =

Australian rules footballer

Personal information
- Full name: Glenn Desmond O'Loughlin
- Born: 4 July 1959 (age 67); Kalgoorlie, Western Australia
- Original team: Boulder City
- Height: 175 cm (5 ft 9 in)
- Weight: 67 kg (148 lb)

Playing career^{1}
Years	Club	Games (Goals)
1979, 84–87	Subiaco	75 (56)
1987	West Coast Eagles	1 (0)
Total		76 (56)
- ^{1} Playing statistics correct to the end of 1987.

Glenn Desmond O'Loughlin (born 4 July 1959) is a former Australian rules footballer who played for the West Coast Eagles in the Victorian Football League (VFL).

== Biography ==
Early in his career, O'Loughlin was a highly successful player in the Goldfields National Football League where he played for Boulder City and won back to back Mitchell Medals in 1982 and 1983.

As a midfielder, he had a second stint at WAFL club Subiaco in 1984, having briefly played there in 1979. He appeared in three successive grand finals from 1985 to 1987 and was a member of Subiaco's 1987 premiership team. In the year of the premiership he was also listed with the West Coast Eagles but played just once, in a loss to St Kilda at Moorabbin Oval where he had six kicks and two handballs. The following year he returned to the country and joined Kalgoorlie City as a playing coach.

O'Loughlin won Kalgoorlie's 'Fairest and Best' award on three occasions in his four seasons as coach. He also won two Fyson Medals in 1988, to go with the one he took home while at Boulder City in 1982.
