= Sydney–West Coast rivalry =

Australian football club rivalry

Sydney–West Coast AFL rivalry
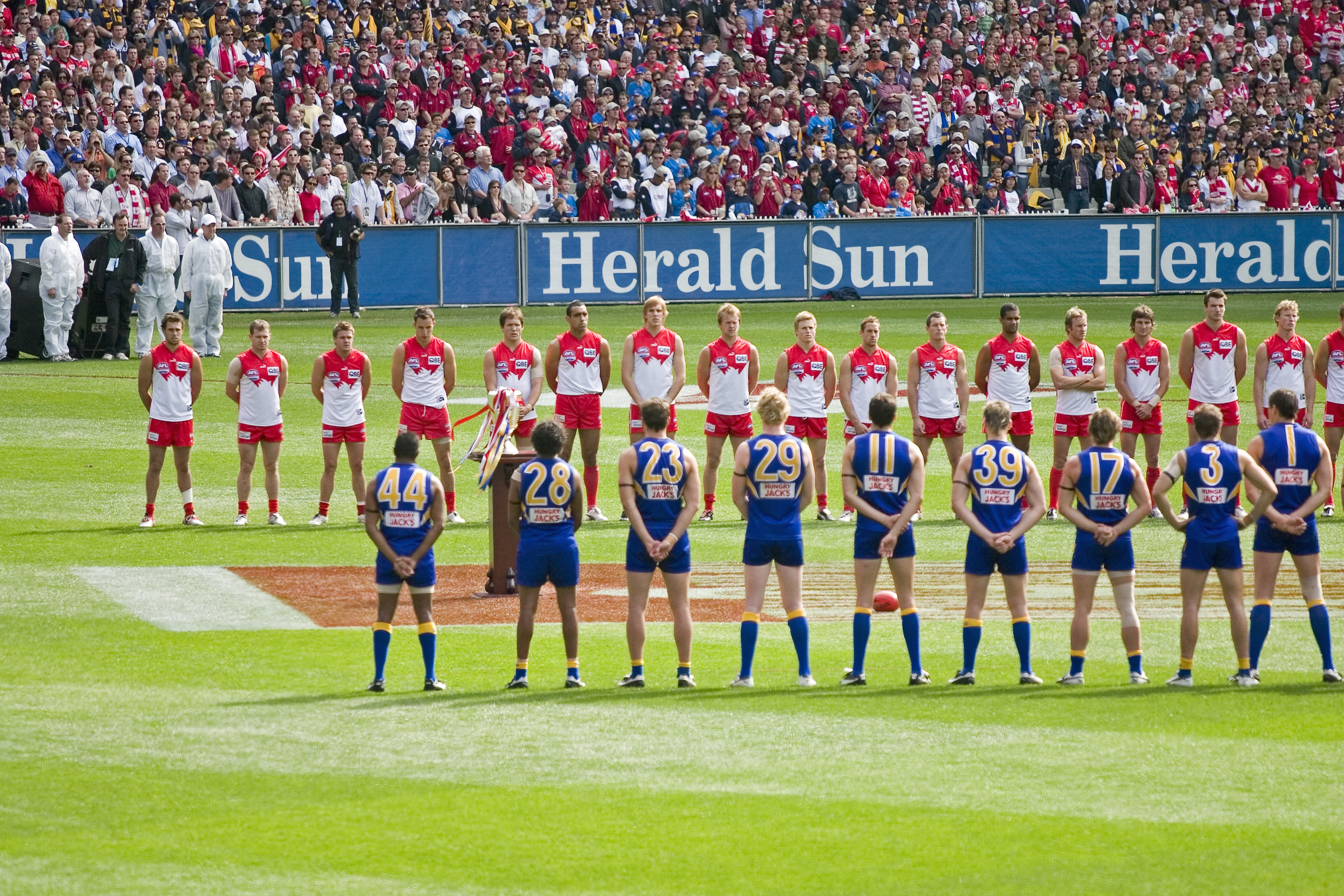
- Sydney and West Coast line up for the national anthem at the 2005 Grand Final, the first of two consecutive grand finals the teams contested.

- Sydney Swans West Coast Eagles
- First meeting: 12 April 1987
- Latest meeting: 6 April 2024
- Next meeting: 23 August 2025

Statistics
- Total meetings: 56
- All-time series: Sydney 34 wins West Coast 22 wins
- Largest victory: Sydney - 171 points (24 June 2023)

Considered a modern-day rivalry, professional Australian rules football clubs the Sydney Swans and West Coast Eagles created one of the most thrilling rivalries in the Australian Football League in the 2000s. In the nineteen months between September 2005 and March 2007, the sides met six times, including both grand finals and two qualifying finals; the final margins of all these games were less than a goal: 4 points, 4, 2, 1, 1 and 1.

Due to these close games, the Sydney–West Coast pairing now holds the following records:

- Lowest total points difference across six games: 13 (next lowest: South Melbourne vs Melbourne, 28 points, 1898–1900)
- Lowest total points difference across five games: 9 (next lowest: Hawthorn vs Collingwood, 19 points, 1958–1960)
- Lowest total points difference across four games: 5 (next lowest: Footscray vs Hawthorn, 7 points, 1931)
- Most consecutive one-point games: 3 (six pairings share with two)

Sydney and West Coast have met in two AFL Grand Finals, with both teams winning one apiece (Sydney in 2005 and West Coast in 2006). Both are regarded as some of the league's all-time great Grand Finals, with both games being decided by under one goal.

Since 2010, the two clubs have competed annually for the HMAS Sydney II Cup, honouring the 645 lives that were lost when the ship was sunk off the coast of Western Australia in November 1945. The Sydney Swans are the current holders of the cup, having defeated the Eagles by an equal club-record 171 points in Round 15, 2023.

== Head to head ==
Since the Eagles joined the VFL in 1987, West Coast and Sydney have faced off 53 times, with the Swans leading 31–22. From these 53 games since 1987, the two clubs have played in five finals against each other, including the 2005 and 2006 Grand Finals. They have not played against each other in a final since the 2006 Grand Final.

Head To Head results
Clubs	Home and Away	Finals	Grand Finals	Totals
Sydney	31	2	1	34
West Coast	20	1	1	22
Played	51	3	2	56

Updated to the end of the 2024 season. See here for source.

== Before 2005 ==
=== The first VFL encounter ===
In Round 3 of the 1987 VFL season, Sydney and West Coast would play against each other, at Subiaco Oval, in their first encounter in the VFL. This was the second VFL game held at Subiaco.

This was also the first time that two VFL teams based outside of Victoria would play for points in VFL/AFL history.

West Coast 14.13 (97) were defeated by Sydney 18.16 (124).

=== Round 2, 2001 ===
Future West Coast premiership ruckman (and now Sydney Swans coach) Dean Cox made his AFL debut in Round 2 of the 2001 season, in a close match which the Eagles lost by just 15 points. This would mark the last time until 2006 that the Swans would defeat the Eagles, let alone win a premiership match, at Subiaco Oval.

West Coast 13.11 (89) were defeated by Sydney 15.14 (104).

=== Round 8, 2004 ===
Dual West Coast premiership player Glen Jakovich played his last AFL game after announcing his retirement in the lead-up to the match. Jakovich kicked three goals as West Coast won only its third match of the season, defeating Sydney by 27 points but having to withstand a final-quarter Swans fightback to do so.

West Coast 18.16 (124) defeated Sydney 15.7 (97).

=== 2004 Elimination Final ===
The first meeting between the Swans and Eagles in a final was the 2004 Elimination Final, only twelve months before the close rivalry began.

In a one-sided game at Telstra Stadium, a match played in thunderous conditions, Sydney thrashed West Coast by 41 points. Sydney 11.9.(75) defeated West Coast 4.10.(34) in front of a crowd of just over 40,000.

== 2005: A rivalry begins ==
=== 2005 Qualifying Final ===
On 2 September 2005, Sydney and West Coast played the first in what would be a string of 6 games decided by under a goal.

In what was a tight game all day, West Coast hit the lead in the last quarter after a 14-point difference at 3-quarter time.

West Coast 10.9 (69) defeated Sydney 10.5 (65).

West Coast won through to the Preliminary Final where they defeated the Adelaide Crows, whilst Sydney was forced to play the following week where they defeated Geelong before beating St Kilda in the Preliminary Final.

=== 2005 Grand Final ===
Team	1 Qtr	2 Qtr	3 Qtr	Final
Sydney	3.0	6.3	6.5	8.10 (58)
West Coast	2.4	2.7	5.9	7.12 (54)
Crowd: 91,828 at the MCG.

=== Round 15, 2006 ===
After leading most of the day, Sydney lost the replay of the preceding year's Grand Final when West Coast kicked 6 goals to 1 in the second half to win by 2 points at Subiaco Oval.

West Coast 9.13 (67) defeated Sydney 9.11 (65).

=== 2006 Qualifying Final ===
In front of 43,000 people at Subiaco, Sydney got over the line by a single point in a game where Michael O'Loughlin kicked a goal in the dying moments before interacting with Eagles fans in the front row behind the goals.

Sydney 13.7 (85) defeated West Coast 12.12 (84).

Sydney won through to the Preliminary Final where they defeated the Fremantle Dockers, whilst West Coast were forced to play the following week where they defeated the Western Bulldogs before beating Adelaide in the Preliminary Final.

=== 2006 Grand Final ===
Team	1 Qtr	2 Qtr	3 Qtr	Final
Sydney	1.4	4.6	8.11	12.12 (84)
West Coast	4.2	8.7	10.10	12.13 (85)
Crowd: 97,431 at the MCG.

=== Round 1, 2007 ===
In what was literally a replay of the Grand Final, West Coast escaped with another one-point victory after Sydney managed to kick 7 goals to one in the second half at ANZ Stadium.

This was the last match in a string of 6 where games were decided by under a goal.

West Coast 11.8 (74) defeated Sydney 10.13 (73)

=== Round 16, 2007 ===
The two sides again managed to have yet another close match; however, for the first time in 7 matches, the winning margin would be over 5 points. This time Sydney would kick six goals to three in the final quarter to go down by 12 points. This was also Ben Cousins' first game for the 2007 season after a controversial off-season. This would stand as West Coast's last win over Sydney until Round 17, 2015.

West Coast 16.16 (112) defeated Sydney 15.10 (100).

== 2008–present: Swans dominance ==
=== Barry Hall and Brent Staker ===
In round four, 2008, Barry Hall made headlines when he punched West Coast's Brent Staker in the jaw. Staker's parents had called for Hall to be suspended for the remainder of the 2008 season, but Hall was only suspended for seven weeks. Sydney broke the trend of close games between the sides winning this match 16.11.(107) to 5.15.(45); it was their biggest win over the Eagles since 2000.

=== Swans comeback ===
Another classic was played out in Round 11, 2008, when Sydney overturned a 36-point halftime deficit to win at Subiaco Oval, their first at the venue in any home-and-away season since 2001.

West Coast kicked 6 goals to none in the first quarter and carried the lead into the halftime break. The Swans managed to kick 4 goals to none in the third term before kicking the final three goals of the match, with the last coming at the 31-minute mark, to win by 5 points.

Sydney 12.11 (83) defeated West Coast 11.12 (78).

=== Another 5-point thriller ===
In round eight, 2009, Sydney once again beat the Eagles by under a goal, this time at ANZ Stadium. The Eagles hit the front late in the final term after facing a 19-point difference at 3-quarter time.

The Eagles looked to have pinched the game away from the Swans before a late goal from Kieren Jack put the Swans in front in the dying minutes to save another game for the Swans.

Sydney 16.10 (106) defeated West Coast 15.11 (101).

=== Swans again in 2011 ===
With 4 minutes to play in round 3, 2011, scores were level as the sides once again battled out a see-sawing event in Perth. Andrejs Everitt of Sydney kicked the final two goals of the match, with the last one only seconds before the final siren. Sydney were the only team to defeat the Eagles on its home ground in season 2011.

Sydney 15.11 (101) defeated West Coast 13.10 (88).

=== Adam Goodes booing incident ===
Round 17, 2015, saw West Coast end its eight-game losing streak against the Swans with a 52-point victory, its biggest win over the club since 2005. However, the match was marred by constant booing from pro-Eagles fans towards Swans player Adam Goodes, who subsequently took leave from the club for one week following the incident.

West Coast 15.13 (103) defeated Sydney 7.9 (51).

=== The first game at Perth Stadium ===
It was announced on 26 October 2017 that the two sides will contest the first ever AFL premiership match at the new Perth Stadium in round one of the 2018 AFL season.

Sydney 18.7 (115) defeated West Coast 13.8 (86).

=== Friday night in Sydney ===
Despite losing the first game of the 2018 season, West Coast won the next 10 in a row. Going into the match, west coast were 1st, with Sydney in 3rd on the AFL ladder.

Sydney 10.12 (72) defeated West Coast 7.15 (57).

=== An upset in 2019 ===
Despite the West Coast Eagles being the reigning premiers, and the Sydney Swans suffering a decline in on-field performance, the Swans were able to defeat the Eagles by 45 points at the Sydney Cricket Ground, with Lance Franklin kicking a goal from the boundary line on the final siren. The win extended the Eagles' hoodoo at the ground to two decades.

Sydney 18.8 (116) defeated West Coast 10.11 (71).

=== Neutral territory in 2021 ===
A COVID-19 outbreak in Sydney saw the fixtured round 16, 2021 match between the Swans and Eagles shifted from the Sydney Cricket Ground to Kardinia Park in Geelong, where the Swans defeated the Eagles by 92 points.

Sydney 18.10 (118) defeated West Coast 3.8 (26).

=== Swans run riot on Good Friday ===
In just their second meeting at Optus Stadium, the Swans made it two from two against the Eagles at the ground, kicking the first nine goals of the match and keeping the Eagles scoreless in the first quarter (the first time this had happened at home in club history) en route to a 63-point victory, which was achieved without injured forward Lance Franklin.

Sydney 18.13 (121) defeated West Coast 9.4 (58).

=== Swans massacre at the SCG ===
On 24 June 2023, the Swans recorded their highest score since 1987, and their equal-biggest victory, kicking 31.19 (205) in a 171-point thrashing of the West Coast Eagles at the Sydney Cricket Ground. This also marked their ninth consecutive victory against the Eagles at the ground, dating back to 2000. As was the case in round five last season, the Swans defeated the Eagles despite being without injured forward Lance Franklin.

Sydney 31.19 (205) defeated West Coast 5.4 (34).

== Sydney–West Coast rivalry results ==
=== V/AFL Results ===
	Year	Round	Home Team	Score	Away Team	Score	Ground	Crowd	Result/Winner	M	H2H
1	1987	3	West Coast	14.13 (97)	Sydney	18.16 (124)	Subiaco Oval	35,179	Sydney	27	+1
2	1987	22	Sydney	30.20 (201)	West Coast	10.11 (71)	Sydney Cricket Ground	24,199	Sydney	130	+2
3	1988	12	Sydney	14.20 (104)	West Coast	8.13 (61)	Sydney Cricket Ground	12,264	Sydney	43	+3
4	1989	3	Sydney	20.14 (134)	West Coast	11.17 (83)	Sydney Cricket Ground	11,298	Sydney	51	+4
5	1989	16	West Coast	16.16 (112)	Sydney	9.16 (70)	Subiaco Oval	13,299	West Coast	42	+3
6	1990	5	West Coast	19.14 (128)	Sydney	10.7 (67)	Subiaco Oval	25,683	West Coast	61	+2
7	1990	18	Sydney	10.8 (68)	West Coast	12.11 (83)	Sydney Cricket Ground	6,970	West Coast	15	+1
8	1991	10	West Coast	15.16 (106)	Sydney	10.17 (72)	Subiaco Oval	33,498	West Coast	34	
9	1992	2	Sydney	14.14 (98)	West Coast	14.11 (95)	Sydney Cricket Ground	9,325	Sydney	3	+1
10	1992	17	West Coast	16.11 (107)	Sydney	8.6 (54)	Subiaco Oval	28,397	West Coast	53	
11	1993	11	Sydney	10.3 (63)	West Coast	17.18 (120)	Sydney Cricket Ground	8,794	West Coast	57	+1
12	1994	10	West Coast	14.17 (101)	Sydney	10.15 (75)	WACA Ground	27,901	West Coast	26	+2
13	1995	12	West Coast	11.7 (73)	Sydney	10.12 (72)	Subiaco Oval	24,574	West Coast	1	+3
14	1996	8	West Coast	14.16 (100)	Sydney	9.10 (64)	WACA Ground	31,411	West Coast	36	+4
15	1996	22	Sydney	12.13 (85)	West Coast	6.14 (50)	Sydney Cricket Ground	29,517	Sydney	35	+3
16	1997	1	West Coast	12.6 (78)	Sydney	5.7 (37)	Subiaco Oval	29,965	West Coast	41	+4
17	1997	16	Sydney	15.22 (112)	West Coast	11.9 (75)	Sydney Cricket Ground	39,318	Sydney	37	+3
18	1998	4	West Coast	14.15 (99)	Sydney	18.10 (118)	WACA Ground	27,059	Sydney	19	+2
19	1998	19	Sydney	10.14 (74)	West Coast	9.14 (68)	Sydney Cricket Ground	30,934	Sydney	6	+1
20	1999	9	Sydney	11.15 (81)	West Coast	14.10 (94)	Sydney Cricket Ground	36,787	West Coast	13	+2
21	2000	2	West Coast	10.10 (70)	Sydney	12.10 (82)	Subiaco Oval	38,127	Sydney	12	+1
22	2000	17	Sydney	22.19 (151)	West Coast	12.8 (80)	Sydney Cricket Ground	22,002	Sydney	71	
23	2001	2	West Coast	13.11 (89)	Sydney	15.14 (104)	Subiaco Oval	32,673	Sydney	15	+1
24	2001	17	Sydney	11.17 (83)	West Coast	6.12 (48)	Sydney Cricket Ground	20,669	Sydney	35	+2
25	2002	11	West Coast	15.12 (102)	Sydney	13.11 (89)	Subiaco Oval	35,014	West Coast	13	+1
26	2003	14	Sydney	13.14 (92)	West Coast	12.12 (84)	Sydney Cricket Ground	31,121	Sydney	8	+2
27	2004	8	West Coast	18.16 (124)	Sydney	15.7 (97)	Subiaco Oval	38,870	West Coast	27	+1
28	2004	EF	Sydney	11.9 (75)	West Coast	4.10 (34)	Stadium Australia	40,282	Sydney	41	+2
29	2005	6	West Coast	15.14 (104)	Sydney	8.11 (59)	Subiaco Oval	39,687	West Coast	45	+1
30	2005	17	Sydney	13.10 (88)	West Coast	9.13 (67)	Sydney Cricket Ground	37,071	Sydney	21	+2
31	2005	QF	West Coast	10.9 (69)	Sydney	10.5 (65)	Subiaco Oval	43,202	West Coast	4	+1
32	2005	GF	West Coast	7.12 (54)	Sydney	8.10 (58)	Melbourne Cricket Ground	91,898	Sydney	4	+2
33	2006	15	West Coast	9.13 (67)	Sydney	9.11 (65)	Subiaco Oval	40,688	West Coast	2	+1
34	2006	QF	West Coast	12.12 (84)	Sydney	13.7 (85)	Subiaco Oval	43,116	Sydney	1	+2
35	2006	GF	Sydney	12.12 (84)	West Coast	12.13 (85)	Melbourne Cricket Ground	97,431	West Coast	1	+1
36	2007	1	West Coast	11.8 (74)	Sydney	10.13 (73)	Stadium Australia	62,586	West Coast	1	
37	2007	16	West Coast	16.16 (112)	Sydney	15.10 (100)	Subiaco Oval	40,014	West Coast	12	+1
38	2008	4	Sydney	16.11 (107)	West Coast	5.14 (45)	Stadium Australia	44,235	Sydney	62	
39	2008	11	West Coast	11.12 (78)	Sydney	12.11 (83)	Subiaco Oval	38,802	Sydney	5	+1
40	2009	8	Sydney	16.10 (106)	West Coast	15.11 (101)	Stadium Australia	33,079	Sydney	5	+2
41	2010	5	Sydney	17.13 (115)	West Coast	9.9 (63)	Sydney Cricket Ground	28,422	Sydney	52	+3
42	2011	3	West Coast	13.10 (88)	Sydney	15.11 (101)	Subiaco Oval	37,288	Sydney	13	+4
43	2012	16	West Coast	10.9 (69)	Sydney	18.13 (121)	Subiaco Oval	39,152	Sydney	52	+5
44	2013	17	West Coast	11.13 (79)	Sydney	17.11 (113)	Subiaco Oval	35,166	Sydney	34	+6
45	2014	16	West Coast	7.9 (51)	Sydney	10.19 (79)	Subiaco Oval	25,076	Sydney	28	+7
46	2015	17	West Coast	15.13 (103)	Sydney	7.9 (51)	Subiaco Oval	38,760	West Coast	52	+6
47	2016	5	Sydney	12.16 (88)	West Coast	7.7 (49)	Sydney Cricket Ground	35,427	Sydney	39	+7
48	2017	4	West Coast	13.13 (91)	Sydney	10.5 (65)	Subiaco Oval	38,065	West Coast	26	+6
49	2018	1	West Coast	13.8 (86)	Sydney	18.7 (115)	Perth Stadium	53,553	Sydney	29	+7
50	2018	13	Sydney	10.12 (72)	West Coast	7.15 (57)	Sydney Cricket Ground	36,402	Sydney	15	+8
51	2019	12	Sydney	18.8 (116)	West Coast	10.11 (71)	Sydney Cricket Ground	36,640	Sydney	45	+9
52	2020	5	West Coast	11.11 (77)	Sydney	6.7 (43)	Carrara Stadium	2,238	West Coast	34	+8
53	2021	16	Sydney	18.10 (118)	West Coast	3.8 (26)	Kardinia Park	9,520	Sydney	92	+9
54	2022	5	West Coast	9.4 (58)	Sydney	18.13 (121)	Perth Stadium	42,888	Sydney	63	+10
55	2023	15	Sydney	31.19 (205)	West Coast	5.4 (34)	Sydney Cricket Ground	31,367	Sydney	171	+11
56	2024	4	West Coast	11.12 (78)	Sydney	15.14 (104)	Summit Sports Park	9,225	Sydney	26	+12

== Players who played for both clubs ==
- Scott Watters (West Coast 1989–92, Sydney 1993–1994)
- **Jason Ball** (West Coast 1992–99, Sydney 2000–2005)
- Mark Seaby (West Coast 2004–09, Sydney 2010–2012)
- Matthew Spangher (West Coast 2008–10, Sydney 2011–2012)
- Mitch Morton (West Coast 2005–07, Sydney 2012–2013)
- **Lewis Jetta** (Sydney 2010–15, West Coast 2016–20)
- Callum Sinclair (West Coast 2013–15, Sydney 2016–22)
- Tom Hickey (West Coast 2019–20, Sydney 2021–23)
- Dean Cox (West Coast 2001–14, Sydney (coach) 2025–)

bold indicates that a player won premierships at both clubs.

== See also ==
- Rivalries in the Australian Football League
