= John Annear =

Australian rules footballer

Personal information
- Full name: John Dudley Annear
- Born: 17 June 1961 (age 65)
- Original team: Claremont (WAFL)
- Debut: Round 10, 1981, Collingwood vs. Richmond, at Victoria Park
- Height: 178 cm (5 ft 10 in)
- Weight: 80 kg (176 lb)
- Position: Midfielder

Playing career^{1}
Years	Club	Games (Goals)
1978–1980, 1990	Claremont	62 (48)
1981–1983	Collingwood	43 (28)
1984–1986	Richmond	65 (43)
1987–1990	West Coast	58 (40)
1991	South Fremantle Football Club	18 (5)
Total		246 (154)
- ^{1} Playing statistics correct to the end of 1990.

John Dudley Annear (born 17 June 1961) is a former Australian rules footballer who played for Collingwood, Richmond and West Coast in the Victorian Football League (VFL) during the 1980s.

Annear began his career in Western Australia with Claremont and played 62 West Australian Football League games over three years before being recruited by Collingwood. He was used as a midfielder and played his best football at Richmond, where in 1984 he finished second in their best and fairest. Andrew Demetriou (subsequently CEO of the Australian Football League from 2003 to 2014) was suspended in that year for striking Annear.

In 1987 he crossed to West Coast who were competing in their inaugural VFL season and was their second most experienced player behind Ross Glendinning. He made State of Origin appearances for Western Australia towards the end of the decade.

John is now a physiotherapist in Cowaramup, Western Australia
