= Mitchell White (footballer, born 1973) =

Australian rules footballer, born 1973

Personal information
- Full name: Mitchell Charles White
- Born: 28 March 1973 (age 53); Adelaide, South Australia
- Original team: Subiaco (WAFL)
- Height: 190 cm (6 ft 3 in)
- Weight: 85 kg (187 lb)

Playing career^{1}
Years	Club	Games (Goals)
1990–1994	Subiaco	44 (44)
1991–2000	West Coast	151 (103)
2001–2003	Geelong	23 (21)
Total		218 (168)
- ^{1} Playing statistics correct to the end of 2003.

Career highlights
- AFL premiership player (1992); West Coast leading goalkicker (1996); All-Australian team (1996); VFL premiership player (2002); West Coast Team of the Decade (1996); West Coast life member (2000)

Mitchell Charles White (born 28 March 1973) is a former Australian rules football player who played for West Coast and Geelong in the Australian Football League (AFL). In 1992, White won a premiership with West Coast in just his second season of AFL football.

== Early life ==
White spent his early years playing rugby league and did not play competitive Australian rules football until his teenage years. By the age of 17, White was playing senior football for Subiaco in the West Australian Football League. He attended Carine Senior High School, the same school as his future teammates Guy McKenna and Darren Glass.

== Football career ==
=== West Coast (1991–2000) ===
Along with Glen Jakovich, White was a priority draft choice from Western Australia in 1990. He played just two games for West Coast in 1991 then advanced to be part of the Eagles' 1992 premiership side. A severe groin injury wrecked White's 1993 season and most of 1994. While not a big marking player, White was very mobile and had strong hands and was considered to be a key performer by other clubs.

In 1996, White switched to the centre half-forward position after playing his entire career to date as a defender. The move paid dividends, with White kicking 37 goals to lead the Eagles' season tally and earn himself a place in the 1996 All-Australian team. Early in 1997, White injured his knee, which sidelined him for the year. White was elevated to vice-captaincy in 2000, but was traded at the end of the year.

=== Geelong (2001–2003) ===
White moved to Geelong for the 2001 season and was an effective forward, averaging a goal a game. However, he only managed seven games in the next two seasons, which signalled his retirement. During his time at Kardinia Park, White won a Victorian Football League premiership for the Geelong reserves in 2002.

== Statistics ==
Legend
G	Goals	K	Kicks	D	Disposals	T	Tackles
B	Behinds	H	Handballs	M	Marks

Season	Team	No.	Games	Totals							Averages (per game)							Votes
Season	Team	No.	Games	G	B	K	H	D	M	T	G	B	K	H	D	M	T	Votes
1991	West Coast	47	2	0	0	15	7	22	6	3	0.0	0.0	7.5	3.5	11.0	3.0	1.5	0
1992†	West Coast	31	22	4	2	151	80	231	53	26	0.2	0.1	6.9	3.6	10.5	2.4	1.2	0
1993	West Coast	12	20	1	9	156	111	267	68	27	0.1	0.5	7.8	5.6	13.4	3.4	1.4	0
1994	West Coast	12	6	3	0	48	14	62	21	9	0.5	0.0	8.0	2.3	10.3	3.5	1.5	0
1995	West Coast	12	23	2	2	179	134	313	102	30	0.1	0.1	7.8	5.8	13.6	4.4	1.3	1
1996	West Coast	12	23	37	15	262	133	395	143	29	1.6	0.7	11.4	5.8	17.2	6.2	1.3	6
1997	West Coast	12	5	4	3	42	27	69	18	6	0.8	0.6	8.4	5.4	13.8	3.6	1.2	0
1998	West Coast	12	14	11	10	118	59	177	57	14	0.8	0.7	8.4	4.2	12.6	4.1	1.0	0
1999	West Coast	12	24	29	14	241	144	385	131	13	1.2	0.6	10.0	6.0	16.0	5.5	0.5	0
2000	West Coast	12	12	12	5	81	54	135	45	10	1.0	0.4	6.8	4.5	11.3	3.8	0.8	0
2001	Geelong	19	16	16	12	116	87	203	78	22	1.0	0.8	7.3	5.4	12.7	4.9	1.4	0
2002	Geelong	19	5	2	3	33	18	51	14	13	0.4	0.6	6.6	3.6	10.2	2.8	2.6	0
2003	Geelong	19	2	3	0	13	2	15	8	1	1.5	0.0	6.5	1.0	7.5	4.0	0.5	0
Career			174	124	75	1455	870	2325	744	203	0.7	0.4	8.4	5.0	13.4	4.3	1.2	7
