= Ashley McIntosh =

Australian rules footballer

Personal information
- Full name: Ashley David McIntosh
- Born: 20 October 1972 (age 54); Melbourne, Victoria
- Original team: Claremont
- Draft: 112th overall, 1989 National draft
- Height: 192 cm (6 ft 4 in)
- Weight: 99 kg (218 lb)
- Position: Utility

Playing career^{1}
Years	Club	Games (Goals)
1990–2003	Claremont	12 (22)
1990–2003	West Coast	242 (108)
Total		254 (130)

Representative team honours^{2}
Years	Team	Games (Goals)
1991–1998	Western Australia	4 (0)
- ^{1} Playing statistics correct to the end of 2003.^{2} Representative statistics correct as of 1998.

Career highlights
- 2× AFL premiership player: 1992, 1994; West Coast Club Champion 1998; All-Australian team 1998; West Coast life member 1998

Ashley David McIntosh (born 20 October 1972) is a former Australian rules footballer who played for the Claremont Football Club in the West Australian Football League (WAFL) and the West Coast Eagles in the Australian Football League (AFL). The son of John McIntosh, who played for Claremont and St Kilda, McIntosh represented West Coast in 242 games between 1991 and 2003, playing in the club's 1992 and 1994 premierships, and was named in the All-Australian team in 1998.

== Early life ==
The son of John McIntosh, who played football for Claremont and St Kilda, McIntosh was the youngest of three children. His sister, Karlene, played tennis for Western Australia, and his brother, Nathan, played senior football for Subiaco, later spending two years on West Coast's list without playing a senior game. McIntosh attended Scotch College in Swanbourne, where he played a high level of football while also playing for the Dalkeith-Nedlands Junior Football Club. He also represented Scotch College in athletics, winning the state hurdles events over 200m and 400m.

== Playing style ==
While capable at either end of the ground, McIntosh most famous for playing at full-back, and in 2006 was named as the full-back in the club's best team ever over its 20-year existence (since 1987). He won a club best and fairest in 1998, and has been an All-Australian.

== Statistics ==
Legend
G	Goals	K	Kicks	D	Disposals	T	Tackles
B	Behinds	H	Handballs	M	Marks

Season	Team	No.	Games	Totals							Averages (per game)							Votes
Season	Team	No.	Games	G	B	K	H	D	M	T	G	B	K	H	D	M	T	Votes
1991	West Coast	53	17	11	6	102	52	154	58	8	0.6	0.4	6.0	3.1	9.1	3.4	0.5	2
1992†	West Coast	11	17	15	9	104	63	167	48	21	0.9	0.5	6.1	3.7	9.8	2.8	1.2	5
1993	West Coast	11	19	25	11	147	61	208	68	29	1.3	0.6	7.7	3.2	10.9	3.6	1.5	5
1994†	West Coast	11	24	22	17	204	97	301	107	25	0.9	0.7	8.5	4.0	12.5	4.5	1.0	11
1995	West Coast	11	10	12	4	54	39	93	34	6	1.2	0.4	5.4	3.9	9.3	3.4	0.6	0
1996	West Coast	11	24	1	2	129	111	240	81	23	0.0	0.1	5.4	4.6	10.0	3.4	1.0	2
1997	West Coast	11	19	5	2	112	65	177	55	13	0.3	0.1	5.9	3.4	9.3	2.9	0.7	0
1998	West Coast	11	23	2	3	203	95	298	90	36	0.1	0.1	8.8	4.1	13.0	3.9	1.6	6
1999	West Coast	11	22	0	1	158	76	234	88	16	0.0	0.0	7.2	3.5	10.6	4.0	0.7	0
2000	West Coast	11	22	9	7	135	68	203	69	24	0.4	0.3	6.1	3.1	9.2	3.1	1.1	0
2001	West Coast	11	12	6	4	78	28	106	50	10	0.5	0.3	6.5	2.3	8.8	4.2	0.8	0
2002	West Coast	11	19	0	0	97	61	158	48	18	0.0	0.0	5.1	3.2	18.3	2.5	0.9	1
2003	West Coast	11	14	0	0	69	48	117	25	14	0.0	0.0	4.9	3.4	8.4	1.8	1.0	0
Career			242	108	66	1592	864	2456	821	243	0.4	0.3	6.6	3.6	10.1	3.4	1.0	32
