= Chris Mainwaring =

Australian rules footballer (born 1965)

- Mainwaring in 1996

Personal information
- Full name: Christopher Douglas Mainwaring
- Nickname: Mainy
- Born: 27 December 1965; Geraldton, Western Australia
- Died: 1 October 2007 (aged 41); Cottesloe, Western Australia
- Original team: Geraldton Rovers (GNFL)
- Height: 177 cm (5 ft 10 in)
- Weight: 85 kg (187 lb)
- Position: Wing

Playing career^{1}
Years	Club	Games (Goals)
1985–1999	East Fremantle	61 (43)
1987–1999	West Coast	201 (84)
Total		262 (127)

Representative team honours
Years	Team	Games (Goals)
1987–1992	Western Australia	8 (0)
- ^{1} Playing statistics correct to the end of 1999.

Career highlights
- 2× AFL Premiership player: (1992, 1994); WAFL Premiership player: (1985); West Coast Rookie of the Year 1987; 2× All-Australian team: (1991, 1996); West Coast Team of the Decade (1996); East Fremantle Team of the Century (1997); West Australian Football Hall of Fame, inducted 2005; West Coast Hall of Fame, inducted 2014

Christopher Douglas Mainwaring (27 December 1965 – 1 October 2007) was an Australian rules footballer who played for the West Coast Eagles in the Australian Football League (AFL) and for the East Fremantle Football Club in the West Australian Football League (WAFL).

Adored by young fans for his handsome appearance, Mainwaring was one of the most popular footballers of his era. At his peak, he was one of the finest wingmen in the AFL, forming a devastating midfield combination with Peter Matera in the early 1990s, but after a serious knee injury in 1997 he was never able to recapture his best form.

After retiring in 1999, Mainwaring worked as a television presenter and sports journalist with the Seven Network and a radio presenter with Mix 94.5 before his death in 2007 from a drug overdose at the age of 41.

== Football career ==
Mainwaring was born in the coastal Western Australian town of Geraldton, over 400 kilometres north of Perth to Hubert Mainwaring and his wife Leah (née Cripps). He started his football career with the Greenough Demons (Rovers) before being recruited by East Fremantle in 1985. In his first season, he was a member of the Western Australian State of Origin team and played in a Sharks premiership team.

He was a member of the West Coast Eagles' inaugural squad in 1987. He made his debut in round three that year, against Sydney at Subiaco and afterwards only missed one game for the season. and was named their best first-year player. Mainwaring played for the Eagles on the wing and contributed greatly to their success, playing in both their 1992 and 1994 premierships. The image of him leaping with joy at the conclusion of the game, despite having a broken ankle, is one of the lasting images of the Eagles' first premiership.

Mainwaring was an All-Australian in 1991 and 1996 and has been named on the wing in the West Coast Eagles' Team of the Decade in 1996, Team20 in 2006 and East Fremantle's Team of the Century in 1997. Whilst he never won the Club Champion award at the Eagles, he finished in the top 10 eight times, including placing third in both his debut and second years in the VFL and second in 1989, 1992 and 1996.

In 1997, he suffered a knee injury, which required a knee reconstruction and this put him out of action for the rest of that season. In 1998, while he was attempting to regain form, Mainwaring spent most of the season playing for the Sharks, before making his return to the West Coast side late that year. After another season in which he was in and out of the Eagles' side (and playing for East Fremantle), Mainwaring retired from AFL football.

He wore the Eagles' number 3 guernsey, a number which had only been worn by him and Chris Judd during the Eagles' history. The club retired the number for the following three seasons, until it was revived by Eagles' draft pick Andrew Gaff in 2011.

After leaving football, Mainwaring took a job with Seven News. By 2007, he was reading the sport at the weekend, as well as reporting during the week. He also read the sport headlines during the news on Perth radio station Mix 94.5 from 5:30 to 9:00 am. In 2005 he was a reporter for the Seven News desk. Between 2001 and his death, he was a member of the selection panel for the All-Australian team and the AFL Rising Star. He was married to Rani and had two children.

== Statistics ==
Legend
G	Goals	K	Kicks	D	Disposals	T	Tackles
B	Behinds	H	Handballs	M	Marks

Season	Team	No.	Games	Totals							Averages (per game)							Votes
Season	Team	No.	Games	G	B	K	H	D	M	T	G	B	K	H	D	M	T	Votes
1987	West Coast	3	19	6	6	308	73	381	114	32	0.3	0.3	16.2	3.8	20.1	6.0	1.7	5
1988	West Coast	3	20	11	7	331	124	455	97	30	0.6	0.4	16.6	6.2	22.8	4.9	1.5	13
1989	West Coast	3	20	3	23	340	140	480	95	29	0.2	1.2	17.0	7.0	24.0	4.8	1.5	7
1990	West Coast	3	21	7	15	331	148	479	91	38	0.3	0.7	15.8	7.0	22.8	4.3	1.8	8
1991	West Coast	3	21	16	9	369	139	508	114	25	0.8	0.4	17.6	6.6	24.2	5.4	1.2	6
1992†	West Coast	3	25	10	13	409	140	549	97	45	0.4	0.5	16.4	5.6	22.0	3.9	1.8	10
1993	West Coast	3	12	10	9	206	56	262	45	20	0.8	0.8	17.2	4.7	21.8	3.8	1.7	0
1994†	West Coast	3	23	7	8	360	130	490	101	44	0.3	0.3	15.7	5.7	21.3	4.4	1.9	6
1995	West Coast	3	9	1	6	131	47	178	36	18	0.1	0.7	14.6	5.2	19.8	4.0	2.0	1
1996	West Coast	3	22	12	11	351	114	465	94	41	0.5	0.5	16.0	5.2	21.1	4.3	1.9	12
1997	West Coast	3	1	0	0	2	0	2	1	0	0.0	0.0	2.0	0.0	2.0	1.0	0.0	0
1998	West Coast	3	3	0	0	12	4	16	3	2	0.0	0.0	4.0	1.3	5.3	1.0	0.7	0
1999	West Coast	3	5	1	1	53	14	67	16	6	0.2	0.2	10.6	2.8	13.4	3.2	1.2	0
Career			201	84	108	3203	1129	4332	904	330	0.4	0.5	15.9	5.6	21.6	4.5	1.6	68

== Death ==
Mainwaring died in the early hours of 1 October 2007 after being rushed to Sir Charles Gairdner Hospital. Police and ambulance had been called to his address earlier that night after a complaint about a man yelling in the street. After Mainwaring refused assistance from the ambulance crew, he was released to the care of a neighbour. About an hour later, emergency services were called back to the property after he had convulsions and collapsed. Mainwaring reportedly told paramedics during the first visit that he had taken ecstasy and smoked cannabis. Former Eagles player Ben Cousins spent time with Mainwaring on Sunday. According to the WA State Coroner's report, Mainwaring had a seizure and died after overdosing on cocaine, rather than several different drugs as media reports originally claimed.

Mainwaring was to compete in a celebrity kickboxing event run by the World Kickboxing Association at Challenge Stadium on 4 October 2007 for charity. He had also been invited by the AFL to hold one of the Eagles' premiership cups during the 2007 AFL Grand Final pre-game entertainment, but he cancelled in the week prior to the game, instead staying in Perth.

Mainwaring's memorial service was held on 8 October 2007 at Christ Church Grammar School, Claremont. About 1,200 people attended the service, including 300 who watched on a big screen outside the chapel. A memorial match was played between his old club and rivals Fremantle in 2008, with the Eagles winning by 25 points. His two young children, along with the Matera trio, also played in the match.

The West Coast Eagles retired Mainwaring's number 3 jumper for the following three seasons as a mark of respect, and the club named its Best Clubman award the Chris Mainwaring Medal in his honour. The Roberts Road wing of Subiaco Oval was named The Chris Mainwaring Wing for all West Coast Eagles home games, until the club moved its home games to the new Perth Stadium in 2018.
