= Phil Scott (footballer) =

Australian rules footballer

Personal information
- Full name: Phil Scott
- Born: 17 January 1961 (age 65)
- Original team: Subiaco
- Height: 193 cm (6 ft 4 in)
- Weight: 91 kg (201 lb)
- Position: Ruckman

Playing career^{1}
Years	Club	Games (Goals)
1982–1992	Subiaco	110 (74)
1987–1990	West Coast Eagles	66 (41)
Total		176 (115)
- ^{1} Playing statistics correct to the end of 1990.

Phil Scott (born 17 January 1961) is a former Australian rules footballer who played for the West Coast Eagles in the Victorian/Australian Football League (VFL/AFL).

A foundation player at West Coast, Scott made his debut in the third round of the 1987 VFL season. He was used as a ruckman and represented Western Australia at the 1988 Adelaide Bicentennial Carnival. Scott twice won West Coast's 'Best Clubman' award, the second of which came after making his final appearance in the 1990 Preliminary Final loss to Essendon. He finished his career back at his original club, Subiaco, with whom he played in the 1986 premiership side. Having taken the field for two further years to bring his tally to 110 WAFL games, Scott retired.
