= Dwayne Lamb =

Australian rules footballer (born 1961)

Personal information
- Full name: Dwayne Francis Lamb
- Born: 20 December 1961 (age 64); Perth, Western Australia
- Original team: North Innaloo
- Height: 180 cm (5 ft 11 in)
- Weight: 93 kg (205 lb)
- Position: Utility

Playing career^{1}
Years	Club	Games (Goals)
1980–86, 89, 93–96	Subiaco	190 (67)
1987–1994	West Coast	151 (44)
Total		341 (111)

Representative team honours^{2}
Years	Team	Games (Goals)
1985–1992	Western Australia	8 (2)
- ^{1} Playing statistics correct to the end of 1996.^{2} Representative statistics correct as of 1992.

Career highlights
- Subiaco premiership side 1986; Simpson Medal 1988; West Coast Eagles premiership side 1992; West Coast Eagles Team of the Decade 1996; West Coast Eagles Team 20 2006

Dwayne Francis Lamb (born 20 December 1961) is a former Australian rules footballer who played with West Coast in the Victorian Football League (VFL) (Australian Football League (AFL) from 1990) and Subiaco in the West Australian Football League (WAFL). A utility player, he was often used as a ruck rover or in defence.

== Playing career ==
Lamb began his junior playing career for North Innaloo before joining Subiaco. He made his league debut in round 2 of the 1980 WAFL season, becoming a regular league player the following season. At the time Subiaco were the league's chopping block, but Lamb quickly established himself in the team and by 1982 – a season when the Lions were on track for a win less season before beating East Fremantle in their seventeenth match – Lamb's tough but unspectacular style won Subiaco's best and fairest award, an achievement repeated in 1984 when under legendary coach Haydn Bunton, Jr., Subiaco finally took steps away from the WAFL cellar.

In 1986, Lamb played in Subiaco's premiership-winning team, kicking two early goals and being part of an on-ball brigade that defeated the Sharks in the Grand Final. Consequently, Lamb made his VFL debut in West Coast's inaugural side in 1987, and became the first player to reach 50, 100 and 150 games for the Eagles. In 1991 against Geelong Football Club, Lamb was knocked out in a sling tackle, which resulted in him swallowing his tongue and his airway being blocked. His airway was opened up by a Geelong trainer with an oropharyngeal airway before he was taken off on a stretcher. Lamb played in West Coast's premiership team in 1992. However, in 1993 Lamb's form declined so much that by 1994 he played only five AFL games and returned to the WAFL, where he played his 300th match of senior football and his 150th with Subiaco in consecutive weeks at the end of the home-and-away season.

In 1996 Lamb was named in the Eagles' official "Team of the Decade". He was named in the Western Australian Football Hall of Fame in 2010.
