= Wally Matera =

Australian rules footballer

Personal information
- Full name: Walter John Matera
- Born: 9 September 1963 (age 63)
- Original team: South Fremantle (WAFL)
- Draft: No. 3, 1989 pre-season draft
- Debut: Round 1, 1987, West Coast vs. Richmond, at Subiaco Oval
- Height: 170 cm (5 ft 7 in)
- Weight: 64 kg (141 lb)

Playing career^{1}
Years	Club	Games (Goals)
1982–1994	South Fremantle	142 (186)
1987–1988	West Coast Eagles	24 (26)
1989–1990	Fitzroy	32 (39)
1991	Prahran	9 (13)
Total		207 (264)
- ^{1} Playing statistics correct to the end of 1990.

Career highlights
- 2 time West Australian representative; 3 time South Fremantle best and fairest 1985, 1992, 1993

Walter John Matera (born 9 September 1963) is a former Australian rules footballer. He played with the West Coast Eagles and Fitzroy in the AFL and for South Fremantle in the WAFL.

Matera arrived in South Fremantle from Wagin Federals, debuting in 1982 at the age of eighteen. Three years later he won their best and fairest and after another solid season, he found himself in West Coast's squad for their debut season. He top scored for the Eagles in their first league game, kicking 4 goals. After a couple of seasons he moved to Victoria where he played with Fitzroy until the end of 1990.

After leaving the AFL he stayed in Victoria, representing Prahran briefly. He then returned to Western Australia, where he won the South Fremantle best and fairest twice more and was appointed captain in 1993 after being vice-captain in 1992.

His brothers, Peter and Phillip Matera both followed in his footsteps and represented West Coast. His sons Brandon and Bailey also play Australian rules football. Brandon played in the AFL for Gold Coast and Fremantle, and in the WAFL for South Fremantle, Peel and Subiaco, whilst Bailey has played for South Fremantle and Subiaco. Both Brandon and Bailey were members of Subiaco's 2021 WAFL premiership winning team.
