= Phillip Matera =

Australian rules footballer, born 1975

Personal information
- Born: 27 November 1975 (age 50)
- Original team: South Fremantle (WAFL)
- Debut: Round 4, 21 April 1996, West Coast Eagles vs. Geelong, at Subiaco Oval
- Height: 171 cm (5 ft 7 in)
- Weight: 76 kg (12 st 0 lb)

Playing career^{1}
Years	Club	Games (Goals)
1994–1998	South Fremantle	45 (93)
1996–2005	West Coast	179 (389)
Total		224 (482)
- ^{1} Playing statistics correct to the end of 2005.

Career highlights
- West Coast leading goalkicker: 2000, 2002, 2003, 2004, 2005; All-Australian: 2003; West Coast Eagles Life Member: 2004 (150 games); VFL/AFL Italian Team of the Century: 2007

Phillip Matera (born 27 November 1975) is a former Australian rules footballer.

== Career ==
Beginning his career in 1996 after having played with South Fremantle since 1994, the 171-centimetre (5 ft 7 in) forward pocket was one of the Australian Football League's best small forwards.

Matera is the brother of former AFL players Peter and Wally, the third of the Matera brothers to player for West Coast. He won the club's goalkicking for the second time in 2002 and his speed and ability to apply pressure often created scoring chances. He hit back strongly after a midseason form slump. In 2003 he was in good form and won All-Australian selection for the first time after kicking 62 goals. In 2004 he just missed out on All-Australian selection after kicking 61 goals, as the selectors opted to play an extra midfielder. In 2005 injury hampered his input but he still managed to kick 39 goals from 19 games. He was a late withdrawal from the 2005 AFL Grand Final due to injury.

On 23 November 2005, Matera announced his retirement from AFL football, citing a chronic back injury. Matera retired from all levels of the game effective immediately, and began focusing on his electrical contracting business, which he began in 2003. He was West Coast's most prominent goalkicker for his final years in a team which struggled for quality key-position forwards, scoring 389 goals from 179 games, the fourth-highest number of goals in the club's history. In December 2009, he become an assistant coach at Claremont.

Matera has since claimed that he walked away from the game in response to not being selected for the 2005 Grand Final. Coach John Worsfold chose the injury prone Travis Gaspar for the Grand Final, who had only played a single game all season, in spite of Matera giving Worsfold his word that he was fit enough to play.

== Statistics ==
Legend
G	Goals	K	Kicks	D	Disposals	T	Tackles
B	Behinds	H	Handballs	M	Marks

Season	Team	No.	Games	Totals							Averages (per game)							Votes
Season	Team	No.	Games	G	B	K	H	D	M	T	G	B	K	H	D	M	T	Votes
1996	West Coast	33	5	8	6	30	16	46	11	6	1.6	1.2	6.0	3.2	9.2	2.2	1.2	0
1997	West Coast	33	19	30	23	182	66	248	74	30	1.6	1.2	9.6	3.5	13.1	3.9	1.6	0
1998	West Coast	33	14	13	13	93	49	142	32	25	0.9	0.9	6.6	3.5	10.1	2.3	1.8	0
1999	West Coast	33	24	51	20	188	91	279	66	37	2.1	0.8	7.8	3.8	11.6	2.8	1.5	4
2000	West Coast	33	19	49	30	164	55	219	57	26	2.6	1.6	8.6	2.9	11.5	3.0	1.4	4
2001	West Coast	33	16	31	22	111	43	154	48	20	1.9	1.4	6.9	2.7	9.6	3.0	1.3	1
2002	West Coast	33	21	46	16	136	66	202	63	36	2.2	0.8	6.5	3.1	9.6	3.0	1.7	1
2003	West Coast	33	19	62	27	136	35	171	53	15	3.3	1.4	7.2	1.8	9.0	2.8	0.8	2
2004	West Coast	33	23	61	42	155	48	203	65	32	2.7	1.8	6.7	2.1	8.8	2.8	1.4	1
2005	West Coast	33	19	38	28	121	40	161	47	22	2.0	1.5	6.4	2.1	8.5	2.5	1.2	1
Career			179	389	227	1316	509	1825	516	249	2.2	1.3	7.4	2.8	10.2	2.9	1.4	14
