= Peter Matera =

Australian rules footballer (born 1969)

Personal information
- Nickname: Roo
- Born: 3 April 1969 (age 57); Wagin, Western Australia
- Original team: South Fremantle (WAFL)
- Height: 183 cm (6 ft 0 in)
- Weight: 89 kg (14 st 0 lb)
- Position: Wing

Playing career^{1}
Years	Club	Games (Goals)
1987–1990	South Fremantle	60 (88)
1990–2002	West Coast	253 (217)
Total		313 (305)

Representative team honours
Years	Team	Games (Goals)
1989–1997	Western Australia	5 (4)
- ^{1} Playing statistics correct to the end of 2002.

Career highlights
- 2× AFL Premiership player: (1992, 1994); Norm Smith Medal: (1992); 5× All Australian team: (1991, 1993, 1994, 1996, 1997); West Coast Club Champion: (1997); Indigenous Team of the Century 2005; Australian Football Hall of Fame, inducted 2006; West Australian Football Hall of Fame, inducted 2004, Legend status 2026; West Coast Eagles Hall of Fame, inducted 2011, Legend status 2026; VFL/AFL Italian Team of the Century 2007

Peter Matera (born 3 April 1969) is a former Australian rules footballer who played for the West Coast Eagles in the Australian Football League (AFL). He is regarded as one of the greatest West Australians and indigenous players being a member of the Australian Football Hall of Fame and Indigenous Team of the Century as well as being 5 time All-Australian and 2 time premiership player.

Best known for his run and carry playing style he is best remembered for his best on ground performance in the 1992 Grand Final which won him the Norm Smith Medal.

== Early life ==
Matera was born in Wagin, Western Australia to an indigenous (Noongar) mother and an Italian father. He has seven siblings (Walter, Frank, Michael, Gino, Phillip, Gerard and Carmel), two of which were his older brother Wally Matera, and younger brother Phillip Matera, who both played football at the elite level. Matera played soccer as a youngster and was influenced by the success of Wally in playing Australian rules football.

Matera was recruited from South Fremantle in the West Australian Football League (WAFL) with the 4th selection in the 1989 National Draft.

== AFL career ==
He made his debut in 1990 for West Coast. Playing just five games in his debut season for the Eagles, Matera broke through as a star youngster in 1991, finishing fourth in the Brownlow Medal and earning All-Australian honors. Matera followed up with an excellent 1992, unlucky to miss AA honours once more but capped off the season with an outstanding finals series.

=== Finest hour ===
Peter Matera permanently etched his name into football folklore with his outstanding performance in the 1992 Grand Final. The West Coast Eagles captured their first premiership on the back of Matera's excellent five goal effort from the wing. Matera collected the Norm Smith Medal for his best on ground performance.

=== Prime of career ===
Matera played during the mid-1990s. His goal sense and reading of the play were noted as aspects of his game. He was selected as an All-Australian in 1993 and 1994. In the 1994 Brownlow Medal count, he was the runner-up with 28 votes, including four best-on-ground performances. Matera was a member of West Coast's second premiership team in 1994; it was later stated that he played the Grand Final with a stress fracture in his leg.

=== Moving back ===
With his trademark speed on the decline, 1996 saw Peter Matera reinvent himself as a half back flank with great success. This part of his career is often overshadowed by his outstanding years as a wingman but Matera made a fine defender and once again enjoyed All-Australian status in 1996 and 1997. Matera was named on a wing in West Coast's team of the decade in 1996.

=== Brother Phil ===
1996 also saw Matera joined at West Coast by his younger brother Phillip. A fine player in his own right, Phillip was a speedy forward pocket who emerged from his brother's shadow later in his career to be regarded as one of the better goal sneaks of his time. Affectionately known as "Fido", Phil Matera retired after the 2005 season playing 179 games and kicking 389 goals for West Coast.

=== Club Champion at last ===
After four top five finishes in the strong West Coast team of the 1990s, Matera won his first Club Champion Award in 1997. Finishing two votes clear of fellow Eagles' champion Dean Kemp. Despite only winning the award once, Matera's consistency throughout the 1990s elevates his status amongst West Coast greats.

=== The Demon decision ===
The most controversial moment of Peter Matera's career came in late 1997 when he shocked the football world by declaring his intentions to leave the West Coast Eagles and join the Melbourne Football Club via the pre-season draft for the 1998 season. Citing a desire to play more at the MCG, Matera's announcement triggered major public outcry in Western Australia and saw many of his longtime Eagles teammates, including captain John Worsfold visit Matera's home (which was staked out by the media). Days after news of Matera's defection broke, he did a back flip, agreeing to stay on at the West Coast Eagles.

=== Winding down ===
Matera's form declined once he reached his thirties. Most of his premiership teammates retired around him leaving Matera one of only a handful of experienced Eagles left by the turn of the century – Matera was named a vice captain of the club in 1999, holding this position for three seasons. The team's fortunes took a turn for the worse in 2000 and 2001, missing the finals for the first time since 1989. Matera, while still finishing top 10 in the Club Champion award was not the outstanding performer he was in his prime. 2002 saw the return to the club of legendary Eagles captain John Worsfold, this time in the role of senior coach. Worsfold's return saw the side return to the finals and saw Matera, aged 33, regain some fine form and it appeared he may play on in 2003. To some surprise and disappointment, late in the preseason of 2003 Peter Matera drew the curtain on his illustrious career, succumbing to a persistent thigh injury which had rendered him unable to reach peak fitness.

Peter Matera played 253 games for the West Coast Eagles and kicked 218 goals over 13 seasons. He also played 60 games for South Fremantle and represented Western Australia in state football on 5 occasions.

== Statistics ==
Legend
G	Goals	K	Kicks	D	Disposals	T	Tackles
B	Behinds	H	Handballs	M	Marks
#	Played in that season's premiership team

Season	Team	No.	Games	Totals							Averages (per game)							Votes
Season	Team	No.	Games	G	B	K	H	D	M	T	G	B	K	H	D	M	T	Votes
1990	West Coast	37	5	3	3	45	16	61	16	3	0.6	0.6	9.0	3.2	12.2	3.2	0.6	0
1991	West Coast	30	26	32	25	401	134	535	87	56	1.2	1.0	15.4	5.2	20.6	3.3	2.2	18
1992^{#}	West Coast	30	23	31	22	349	110	459	63	65	1.3	1.0	15.2	4.8	20.0	2.7	2.8	9
1993	West Coast	30	20	23	24	317	124	441	74	43	1.2	1.2	15.9	6.2	22.1	3.7	2.2	10
1994^{#}	West Coast	30	24	21	20	305	108	413	77	68	0.9	0.8	12.7	4.5	17.2	3.2	2.8	28
1995	West Coast	30	20	31	15	284	82	366	74	40	1.6	0.8	14.2	4.1	18.3	3.7	2.0	13
1996	West Coast	30	24	9	10	339	119	458	98	71	0.4	0.4	14.1	5.0	19.1	4.1	3.0	9
1997	West Coast	30	21	7	8	336	132	468	93	39	0.3	0.4	16.0	6.3	22.3	4.4	1.9	21
1998	West Coast	30	21	17	13	294	81	375	76	55	0.8	0.6	14.0	3.9	17.9	3.6	2.6	6
1999	West Coast	30	16	8	6	196	92	288	71	37	0.5	0.4	12.3	5.8	18.0	4.4	2.3	8
2000	West Coast	30	17	22	12	216	88	304	63	39	1.3	0.7	12.7	5.2	17.9	3.7	2.3	1
2001	West Coast	30	19	2	4	245	67	312	69	42	0.1	0.2	12.9	3.5	16.4	3.6	2.2	3
2002	West Coast	30	17	11	4	212	76	288	44	57	0.6	0.2	12.5	4.5	16.9	2.6	3.4	0
Career			253	217	166	3539	1229	4768	905	615	0.9	0.7	14.0	4.9	18.9	3.6	2.4	126

== Honours and achievements ==
Team

- 2× AFL premiership player (West Coast): 1992, 1994
- 2× McClelland Trophy (West Coast): 1991, 1994

Individual

- Norm Smith Medal: 1992
- John Worsfold Medal: 1997
- 5× All-Australian team: 1991, 1993, 1994, 1996, 1997
- 4× State of Origin (Western Australia): 1991, 1992, 1993, 1997
- Australian Football League Indigenous Team of the Century 1904-2003 – Wing
- Italian Team of the Century – Wing

== Life after football ==
In August 2005, Matera was named on the wing of the Indigenous Team of the Century. Matera said of the honour:

Stephen Michael was my idol as a kid, and we used to hear all about how good Polly Farmer was so to be recognised with them is an honor.

After leaving the football world following his retirement, Matera dabbled in coaching in South Western WA before signalling his intentions to return to the game in a larger capacity. Despite being linked by some to the vacant assistant coaching position at West Coast, Matera took on an assistant coaching and mentoring role at the East Perth Football Club in the WAFL for the 2006 season.

On 10 March 2006, Matera was inducted into the Western Australian Football Hall of Fame.

On 22 June 2006, Matera became the first ever career West Coast Eagle to be inducted into the Australian Football Hall of Fame. Considered an honour in Australian Football, Matera was pleased to receive the recognition

To be inducted in the highest level of football and accolades as in the Hall of Fame is one of those things that just caps off my career. This more or less finishes my career on a high.

In early 2015, the Matera Foundation was formed to assist Aboriginal Australians in finding employment.

In 2019, it was announced that Matera would join the AFL Tribunal in 2020.

In May 2022, Matera was rushed to hospital after suffering a heart attack.
