= West Coast Eagles =

Australian rules football club

Names
- Full name: West Coast Eagles Football Club
- Nickname(s): Eagles; Indigenous rounds: Waalitj Marawar

2026 season
- Home-and-away season: AFL: 16th AFLW: 15th* WAFL: 7th
- Leading goalkicker: AFL: Jake Waterman (49 goals); AFLW: WAFL: Josh Burke (16 goals)

Club details
- Founded: 20 October 1986; 40 years ago
- Colours: Royal blue gold
- Competition: AFL: Senior men AFLW: Senior women WAFL: Reserves men
- Owners: WA Football
- Chairperson: Elizabeth Gaines
- CEO: Don Pyke
- Coach: AFL: Andrew McQualter; AFLW: Daisy Pearce; WAFL: Kyal Horsley
- Captain(s): AFL: Liam Duggan & Liam Baker; AFLW: Charlie Thomas & Bella Lewis; WAFL: Callum Jamieson
- Number-one ticket holder: Jack Cowin
- Premierships: AFL (4): 1992; 1994; 2006; 2018
- Ground: AFL: Optus Stadium (61,266); AFLW/WAFL: Mineral Resources Park (6,500)
- Former ground: WACA Ground (1987–2000); Subiaco Oval (1987–2017)
- Training ground: Mineral Resources Park

Uniforms
Home	Away	Clash

Other information
- Official website: WestCoastEagles.com.au

The West Coast Eagles are a professional Australian rules football club based in Perth, Western Australia. The club was founded in 1986 and first competed in 1987 as one of two expansion teams in the Australian Football League (AFL), then known as the Victorian Football League. The club plays its home games at Optus Stadium and has its headquarters at Lathlain Park. WA Football wholly owns the West Coast Eagles and the Fremantle Football Club, the AFL's other Western Australian team.

The West Coast Eagles are one of the most successful clubs in the AFL era (1990 onwards). They have won the equal third most premierships (four, along with Geelong, second to Hawthorn and third to Brisbane) of any club in that time and were the first non-Victorian team to compete in and win an AFL Grand Final, achieving the latter feat in 1992. The Eagles have since won premierships in 1994, 2006 and 2018. They are one of the most profitable and influential clubs in the league, and as of 2021 have the second-highest membership total with 107,079 members.

West Coast also fields a women's team in the AFLW competition and a reserves team in the WAFL.

== History ==
Chart of yearly ladder positions for West Coast in AFL

West Coast Eagles seasons
Year	No.	P	W	D	L	%
1987	8th	22	11	0	11	97.87
1988	4th	23	13	0	10	111.85
1989	11th	22	7	0	15	86.69
1990	3rd	26	17	1	8	118.44
1991	1st	26	21	0	5	162.21
1992	4th	25	18	1	6	125.91
1993	6th	22	13	0	9	115.81
1994	1st	25	19	0	6	132.19
1995	5th	24	14	0	10	122.87
1996	4th	24	16	0	8	125.20
1997	5th	24	13	0	11	111.24
1998	7th	23	12	0	11	109.42
1999	5th	24	13	0	11	106.76
2000	13th	22	7	1	14	92.37
2001	14th	22	5	0	17	65.95
2002	8th	23	11	0	12	97.96
2003	7th	23	12	2	9	117.36
2004	7th	23	13	0	10	103.76
2005	2nd	25	19	0	6	123.96
2006	1st	26	20	0	6	120.44
2007	3rd	24	15	0	9	111.73
2008	15th	22	4	0	18	65.88
2009	11th	22	8	0	14	93.30
2010	16th	22	4	0	18	77.09
2011	4th	25	18	0	7	130.32
2012	5th	24	16	0	8	124.18
2013	13th	22	9	0	13	95.28
2014	9th	22	11	0	11	116.86
2015	2nd	25	18	1	6	148.20
2016	6th	23	16	0	7	130.00
2017	8th	24	13	0	11	105.71
2018	2nd	25	19	0	6	121.40
2019	5th	24	16	0	8	112.5
2020	5th	18	12	0	6	117.04
2021	9th	22	10	0	12	93.2
2022	17th	22	2	0	20	59.8
2023	18th	23	3	0	20	53.0
2024	16th	23	5	0	18	68.1
2025	18th	23	1	0	22	60.1
2026*	16th	23	4	0	19	69.2

=== 1986–1989: Formation and first years ===
The West Coast Eagles were selected in 1986 as one of two expansion teams to enter the Victorian Football League (VFL) the following season, along with the Brisbane Bears. Ron Alexander was appointed as the team's inaugural coach in September 1986, with the inaugural squad, comprising a majority of players from the West Australian Football League (WAFL), unveiled in late October. The Eagles benefitted from a strong WAFL competition and very loose transfer restrictions relative to later expansion teams, with early success seen as a key factor to promoting the new national competition. Ross Glendinning, recruited from North Melbourne, was made the club's first captain as one of the few players with previous VFL experience. The team's first senior match in the VFL was played against Richmond at Subiaco Oval in late March 1987, with West Coast defeating Richmond by 14 points. Having won eleven games and lost eleven games for the season, the club finished eighth out of fourteen teams. At the end of the season, John Todd, the coach of Swan Districts in the WAFL, replaced Alexander as West Coast's coach. The club made the finals for the first time in 1988, but lost form the following season, winning only seven games to finish 11th on the ladder.

=== 1990–1999: Malthouse era and dual premierships ===
Todd was sacked at the end of the 1989 season, and was replaced by Mick Malthouse, who had previously coached Footscray. With the competition having rebranded itself as the Australian Football League (AFL) at the start of the 1990 season, West Coast finished third on the ladder at the conclusion of the home-and-away season, and progressed to the preliminary final before losing to Essendon, having been forced to play four consecutive finals in Melbourne.

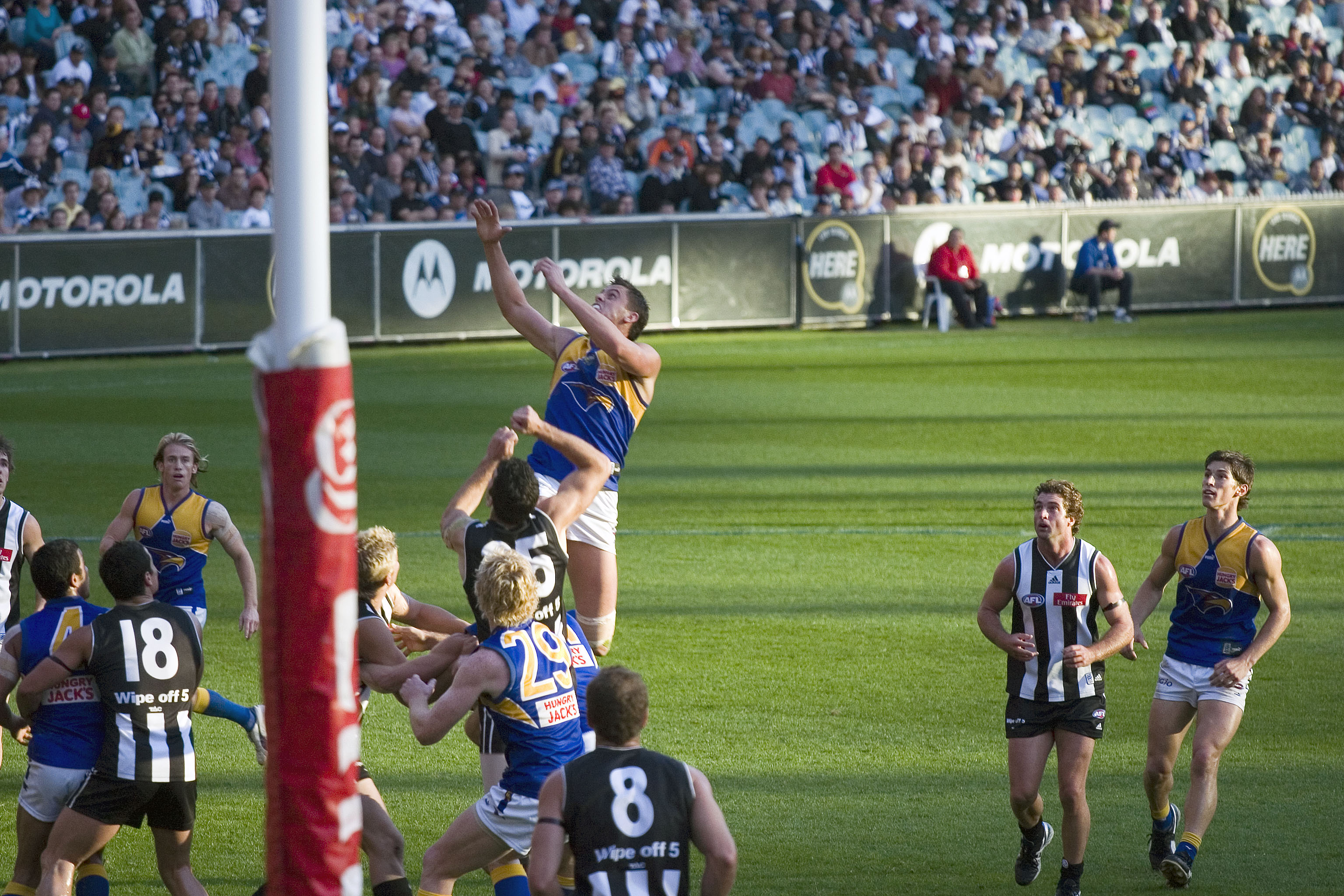
Michael Gardiner contests a boundary throw-in against Collingwood during the 2005 season.

John Worsfold replaced Steve Malaxos as captain for the 1991 season, and the club finished the season as minor premiers for the first time, losing only three games. In the finals series, West Coast progressed to the grand final, but were defeated by Hawthorn by 53 points. Peter Sumich kicked 111 goals during the season, becoming the first West Coast player to reach a century of goals, as well as the first-ever left-footer. In 1992, West Coast finished fourth on the ladder, but again progressed to the grand final, defeating Geelong by 28 points to become the first team based outside Victoria to win a premiership. Having slipped to third in 1993, the club finished as minor premiers the following season, and went on to again defeat Geelong in the grand final to win its second premiership in three years. In 1995, a second AFL team based in Western Australia, the Fremantle Football Club, with the two clubs' subsequent rivalry branded as the "Western Derby". West Coast made the finals in every year that remained in the 1990s, but failed to reach another grand final, with a fourth-place finish in 1996 their best result. Worsfold retired at the end of the 1998 season, and was replaced by his vice-captain, Guy McKenna, who served as captain until his retirement two seasons later.

=== 2000–2005: Struggles, rebuild and Worsfold era ===
Malthouse left West Coast at the end of the 1999 season to take up the senior coaching position with Collingwood, and was replaced by Ken Judge, who had been coach of Hawthorn. The 2000 and 2001 seasons were marked by a rapid decrease in form after the loss of several key senior players, culminating in a 14th-place in 2001, at the time the worst in the club's history. Round eighteen of the 2000 season marked the club's final match at the WACA Ground, which had been used concurrently with Subiaco Oval since the club's inception. Judge was sacked on 5 September 2001, just days after a 112-point loss to Port Adelaide, their 10th loss in 2001 by over 60 points. He was replaced by the club's former captain John Worsfold, who had been serving as assistant coach at Carlton.

The club made the finals in 2002, 2003, and 2004, but each time failed to progress past the elimination final. Ben Cousins was made sole captain of the club in 2002, having shared the role with Dean Kemp the previous season. During this time, the team was boosted by a number of high picks in the AFL draft gained as a result of the previous poor finishes. Chris Judd, who had been taken with pick three in the 2001 National draft, won the Brownlow Medal as the best player in the competition in 2004, becoming the first West Coast player to win the award. In 2005, the Eagles won 15 of their first 16 games, and were 20 points clear on top of the ladder at stages, but they eventually slipped to second behind Adelaide. They progressed to the grand final against Sydney, where they were defeated by four points. Chris Judd received the Norm Smith Medal.

For the second consecutive year, the Brownlow Medal was won by an Eagles player, with Ben Cousins and Daniel Kerr finishing first and second, respectively.

=== 2006–2010: Third premiership, controversies and final misses ===
West Coast finished as minor premiers for a third time in 2006, with seventeen wins from 22 games. In the 2006 finals series, the club lost the qualifying final to Sydney by one point, but after defeating the Western Bulldogs and the Adelaide Crows in the semi- and preliminary final, respectively, again progressed to the grand final, where the Eagles defeated Sydney by a point in an exact reversal of the score in the qualifying final. The two grand finals in 2005 and 2006 were part of a series of close games between the two clubs that resulted in a total difference of thirteen points across six games, an AFL record.

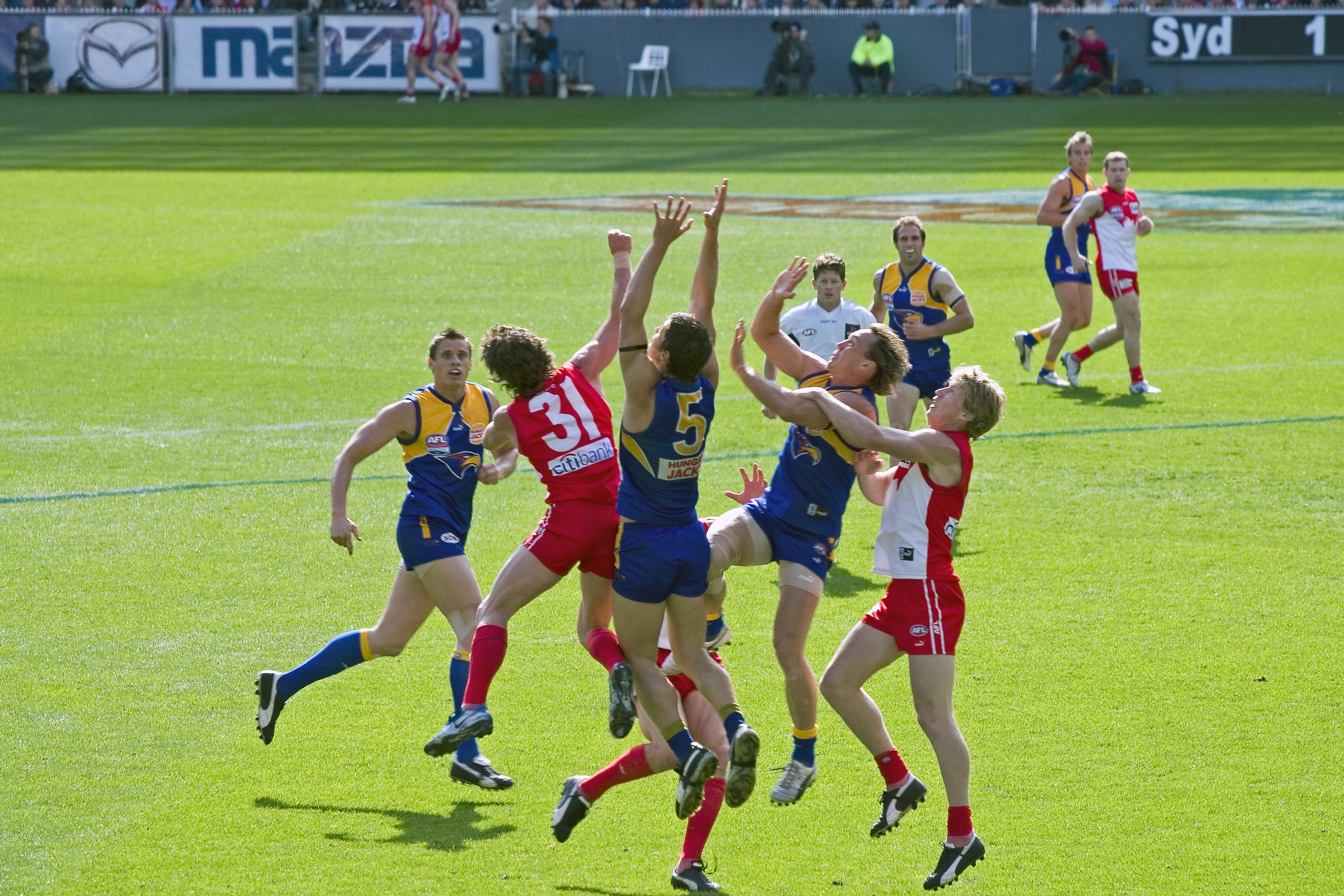
Daniel Chick and Tyson Stenglein in a marking contest against Sydney in the 2005 Grand Final.

The club finished third during the regular 2007 season, but after a series of late-season injuries lost both its games during the final series. During the past few seasons, the club had been impacted by a series of highly publicised off-field controversies involving allegations of recreational drug use, nightclub assaults, and links to outlawed motorcycle gangs. Michael Gardiner was traded after crashing his car while drunk, and Ben Cousins resigned the captaincy of the club prior to the 2006 season after being charged with evading a police breath test, with Chris Judd taking over as captain. Cousins was sacked at the end of the 2007 season after being arrested for possession of drugs, while Judd requested to be traded back to Victoria, and was traded to Carlton in exchange for a key forward, Josh Kennedy, and several draft picks. Darren Glass, the club's full back since the retirement of Ashley McIntosh in 2003, was then appointed captain. These controversies were followed by a series of poor seasons on-field, culminating in the club's first wooden spoon, after winning only four games in 2010. The three-year period between 2008 and 2010 was the longest time in the club's history without a finals appearance.

=== 2011–2013: Breakthrough years ===
Despite predictions of another bottom-four finish in 2011, West Coast won 16 games to finish in the top four, becoming the first team since the Brisbane Lions in 1998 and 1999 to reach a preliminary final after finishing last the previous season.

West Coast's strong form continued into 2012, losing the 2012 NAB Cup grand final to Adelaide and spending the early part of the season on top of the table. They eventually finished fifth and bowed out in the semi-finals to Collingwood. The Eagles went into 2013 as premiership favourites, although injuries and poor form saw the club finish in thirteenth position on the ladder, with the club losing its final three games by an average of 71 points. Coach John Worsfold resigned on 5 September 2013.

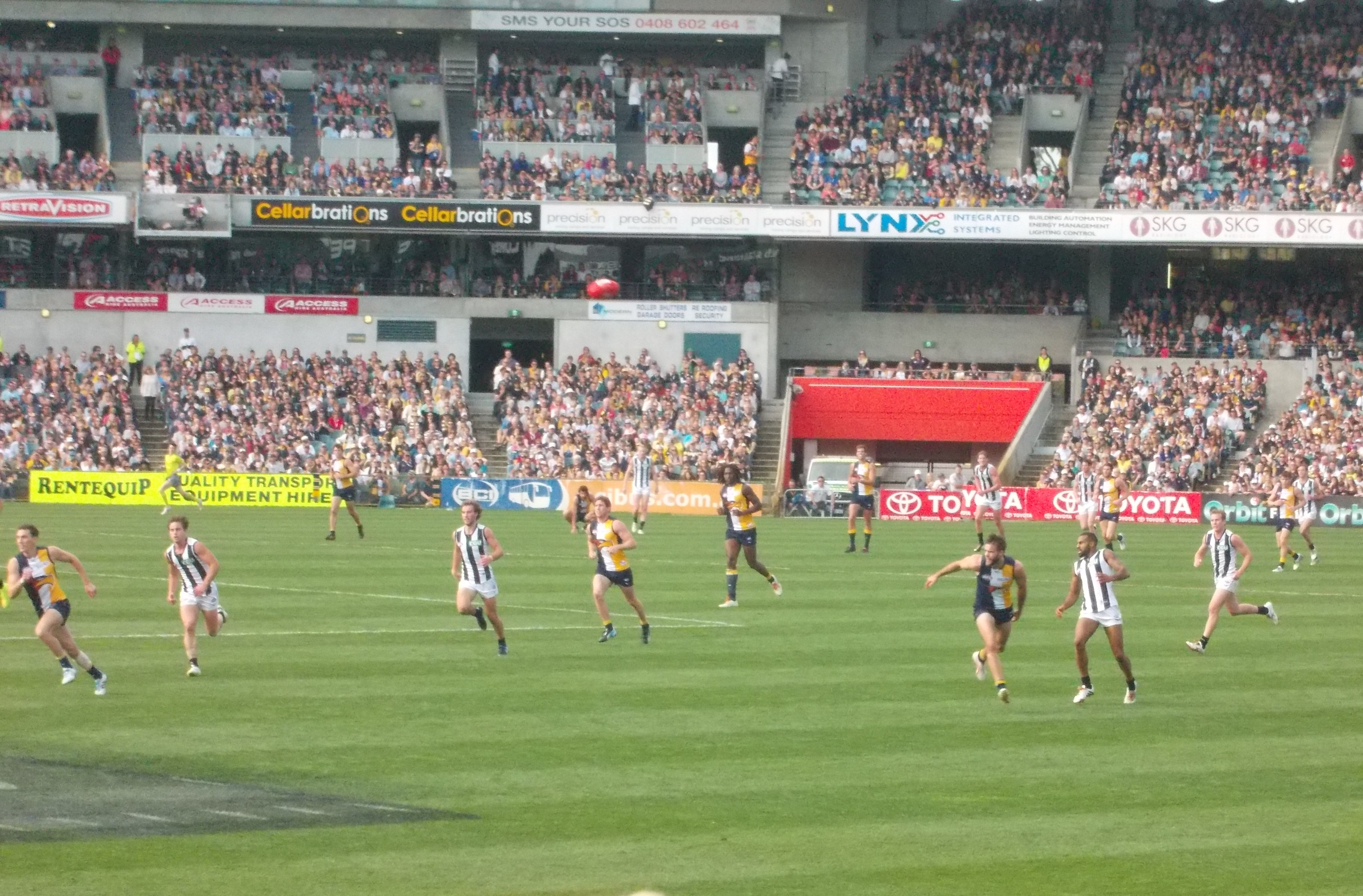
Round 20 2014 – West Coast vs Collingwood at Subiaco Oval

=== 2014–2024: Simpson era, fourth premiership and downfall ===
Former North Melbourne player Adam Simpson was announced as the team's new coach for the 2014 season. Darren Glass was initially renamed as captain, but retired from football after round 12. He was replaced by five acting co-captains for the remainder of the season – Shannon Hurn, Josh Kennedy, Eric Mackenzie, Matt Priddis, and Scott Selwood. West Coast had a strong preseason and won their opening three matches, although they eventually finished in ninth position. During the season the club were labelled as "flat track bullies" due to beating lower placed teams by large margins, yet failing to defeat teams above them on the ladder. Midfielder Matt Priddis became the third Eagles player to win a Brownlow medal, winning the 2014 medal at the end of the season.

On 7 December 2014, Shannon Hurn was appointed as sole captain for 2015 and beyond. At the start of the 2015 season, West Coast lost two of their opening three games and suffered injuries to key players. Despite this, they went on to lose only three more games for the rest of the home and away season, finishing behind local rivals Fremantle in second position. The Eagles went on to defeat Hawthorn and North Melbourne in the qualifying and preliminary finals by 32 and 25 points respectively to qualify for the 2015 Grand Final, their first since 2006, only to lose to Hawthorn by 46 points. The following season ended up being a disappointment, with the team failing to produce another top 4 finish in spite of a late form reversal. In their elimination final, the heavily favoured Eagles were defeated at home by the Western Bulldogs, who went on to claim the 2016 premiership.

In 2017, West Coast finished in eighth position on the table. A thrilling finish against Adelaide in the last game at Subiaco was enough to put them into their third consecutive finals series under Simpson. Their percentage of 105.7% edged out Melbourne, who finished with the same number of wins and an almost identical percentage of 105.2%. Remarkably, their elimination final away against Port Adelaide ended up a tie after regulation time and was sent to extra time. The Eagles controversially won after the siren courtesy of a Luke Shuey goal. The following week they were soundly defeated away by Greater Western Sydney, in front of the lowest finals crowd in over 100 years.

Few predicted West Coast would contend in season 2018, with most having them outside the 8. After losing the inaugural game at the new Optus Stadium against the Sydney Swans, West Coast went on to win 10 in a row to surge to top of the ladder, including defeating Hawthorn at Etihad and Richmond, the eventual minor premiers. However, injuries to star forwards Josh Kennedy and Jack Darling saw them struggle, losing 3 games in a row including to Sydney for a second this time at the SCG. Despite injuries, they managed to rebound and stabilise. The Eagles' form at the MCG had long been criticised, and round 17 against an in-form Collingwood who had won 7 of the previous matches was seen as a stern test. The match was fairly close throughout, until the Eagles got on top in the last ten minutes of the third quarter to win by a commanding 35 points. The victory was bittersweet, however, as the All-Australian ruckman Nic Naitanui went down with an ACL for the second time after his 2016 injury, putting him out for the rest of the season. In round 20 star midfielder Andrew Gaff was suspended for 8 weeks for a hit on Fremantle player Andrew Brayshaw. Following this many dismissed the Eagles, believing they were unable to win the flag. The following week there was a bright spot in a dark period, as Jeremy McGovern kicked a goal after the siren at Adelaide Oval to pinch the game from Port Adelaide, in similar circumstances to West Coast's win over Port in the 2017 elimination final.

The Eagles finished the 2018 home and away season second on the ladder with 16 wins and 6 losses – their best result since 2006 – earning the right to host the second qualifying final against third-placed Collingwood at Optus Stadium. Collingwood led for most of the close, hard-fought match, before the Eagles again pulled away in the last quarter to win by 16 points.

In the 2018 second preliminary final, the Eagles faced the fifth-placed Melbourne Demons, a team whose impressive end-of-season form had begun with a victory over the Eagles at Optus Stadium in round 22. What was touted as a close-fought match instead became a blowout. West Coast led 10.9.69 to 0.6.6 at half time, Melbourne becoming the first team since 1927 to fail to score a goal in a half of finals football. West Coast eventually won by 66 points, 121 to 55.

In the 2018 grand final, West Coast again played Collingwood, who had upset Richmond in the first preliminary final the week prior. In a match dubbed an all-time classic, Collingwood led by as much as 29 points in the first quarter, but the resilient Eagles managed to claw their way back into the contest, and with just over 2 minutes left, a brilliant play set up by a Jeremy McGovern intercept mark and a further sensational mark by first year player Liam Ryan saw Dom Sheed score a goal from a tight angle to put the Eagles 4 points in front. The Eagles went on to win 79 to 74, claiming their fourth premiership in front of 100,022 at the MCG. Luke Shuey won the Norm Smith Medal.

The Eagles started their 2019 premiership defence in indifferent fashion, suffering three heavy defeats in the first six weeks of the 2019 season. The reigning premiers recovered magnificently, winning 12 of their next fourteen matches, but missed out on a spot in the top four after an upset 38-point loss to Hawthorn in round 23. The Eagles finished fifth on the AFL ladder with a 15–7 win-loss record. They thrashed Essendon by 55 points in the first elimination final but their premiership defence was brought to a premature end the following week, losing to minor premiers Geelong by 20 points in the first semi-final.

The 2020 season began with a lacklustre win over Melbourne in Round 1 in March, after which followed a hiatus due to the disruptions caused by the COVID-19 virus. Games resumed in June, with West Coast playing their games in a Queensland hub environment, going 0–3 in June to begin Round 5 in 16th place. From there, West Coast recovered to sit in 5th place with a record of 12–5 at the end of Round 18. Despite being undefeated at their Perth home ground during the regular season, the Eagles bowed out in the first week of the finals after an upset one-point defeat to Collingwood in the first elimination final at Optus Stadium.

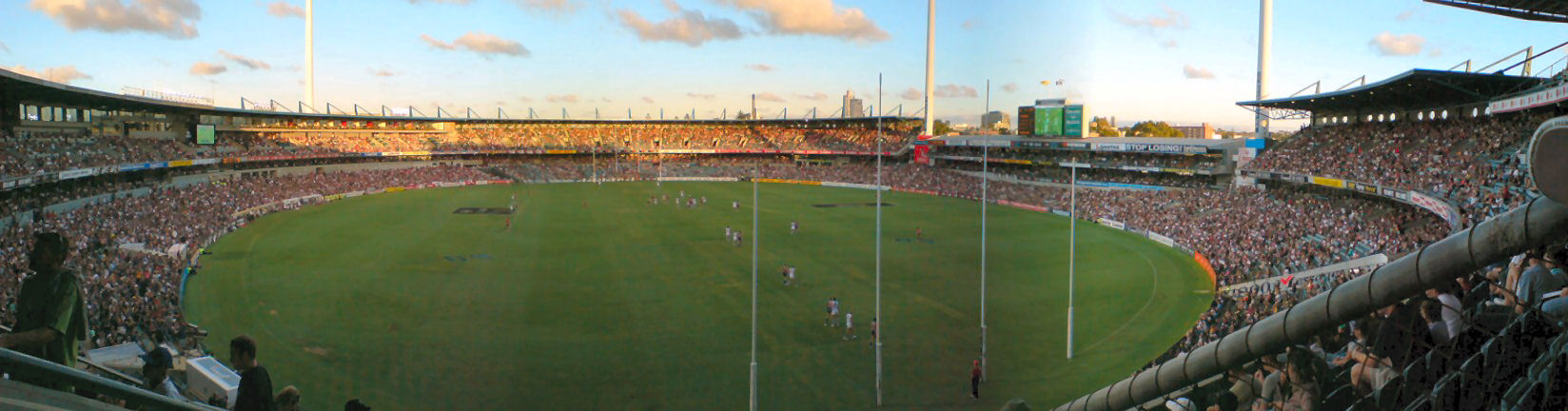
Subiaco Oval during a match against Fremantle in the 2008 NAB Cup.

The 2021 season proved to be the end of a successful era for the Eagles. West Coast struggled to find their best form throughout the year and ultimately missed the finals for the first time since 2014, finishing ninth on the ladder with 10 wins and 12 losses. With crosstown rival Fremantle finishing 11th, it was the first season since 2009 that neither Western Australian team featured in the finals series.

COVID and an extensive injury list saw many key players sidelined and West Coast's performance decline rapidly over the next two years. The 2022 season saw the Eagles finish 17th on the ladder with 2 wins and 20 losses, avoiding the wooden spoon by percentage. The 2023 season was West Coast's worst season in history, losing five games by more than 100 points on the way to an 18th-placed finish with 3 wins and 20 losses, thus claiming the second wooden spoon in the club's history.

On 9 July 2024, following no improvement in on-field performances despite the best player availability in three seasons, the club announced that Adam Simpson had been sacked as coach.

Andrew McQualter was appointed West Coast's senior coach in September 2024, replacing caretaker senior coach Jarrad Schofield.

== Finance and ownership ==
The West Coast Eagles have been owned by the West Australian Football Commission (WAFC) since 1989. The club was originally owned and operated by Indian Pacific Limited, a publicly listed company that was delisted from the Australian Securities Exchange in 1990 after 75% of the shares were bought out by the WAFC. The last minority shareholders were bought out in 2000. During the 2010s West Coast paid approximately $3 million in rent to the WAFC for the use of Subiaco Oval, and 50–70% of overall profits. In 2001, a South African investment company, Southern African Investments Limited, had proposed a AUD$25-million deal for a 49-percent stake in the club, with the bid being rejected in 2003. In 2011, it was reported that the AFL had lobbied to take over the ownership of both the Eagles and the Fremantle Football Club from the WAFC.

In 2023, the West Coast Eagles reported a $1.9 million operating surplus.

== Membership and attendance ==
Number-one ticket-holders
Years	Name	Occupation
1993–1994	Denis McInerney	Car dealer
1995–1996	Ernie Dingo	Television personality
1997–1998	Geoff Christian	Sports journalist
1999–2000	Ray Turner	Businessman
2001–2002	Tony Evans	Former footballer
2003–2004	Dennis Lillee	Former cricketer
2005–2006	Jeff Newman	Television personality
2007–2008	Nigel Satterley	Businessman
2009–2010	Ross Glendinning	Former footballer
2011–2012	Michael Brennan	Former footballer
2013–2014	Rod Moore	Club Doctor
2015–2016	Daniel Ricciardo	F1 Driver
2017–2018	Julie Bishop	Politician
2019–2020	Sam Kerr	Soccer player
2021–2022	Robert Wiley	Former footballer
2023–2024	Jan Cooper	Football administrator
2025–	Jack Cowin	Businessperson

=== Membership ===
In 2011, the West Coast Eagles had 54,745 members, which was a club record at the time, and the fourth-highest overall in the AFL. Membership numbers were limited by the capacity of Subiaco Oval, which held 43,500 seats, with 39,000 reserved exclusively for club members. In 2012, the cost of an adult club membership was $283, the most of any club in the AFL. At that time, the waiting list was in excess of 20,000 people, or around four years. In July 2015, the club reached a record high of more than 60,000 members, which was the highest for a club in Western Australia, as well as being the sixth highest in the league.

Membership expanded rapidly after the club moved its home games to Optus Stadium and won the 2018 premiership. In 2019, the club reached 90,445 members, becoming the second club in history to pass the 90,000 mark and having the second highest membership in the competition. The club recorded more members than any other AFL team in 2020 (100,776) and 2021 (106,422).

Following this peak, membership numbers remained high despite a period of poor on-field performance. The club registered 102,897 members in 2022, and grew again in 2023 to 103,275 members. In 2024, the club once again set an all-time AFL record, finishing the season with 104,276 members, the most of any club in the competition.

West Coast Eagles Membership Tally (1986–2025)
Year	Total Members	Difference
1986	0	—
1987	2,800	+2,800
1988	8,480	+5,680
1989	9,223	+743
1990	10,450	+1,227
1991	17,636	+7,186
1992	29,302	+11,666
1993	25,779	−3,523
1994	24,265	−1,514
1995	26,821	+2,556
1996	26,663	−158
1997	33,286	+6,623
1998	37,496	+4,210
1999	36,212	−1,284
2000	38,868	+2,656
2001	38,649	−219
2002	34,880	−3,769
2003	36,234	+1,354
2004	40,792	+4,558
2005	42,406	+1,614
2006	44,138	+1,732
2007	45,949	+1,811
2008	44,863	−1,086
2009	43,927	−936
2010	44,160	+233
2011	54,040	+9,880
2012	57,377	+3,337
2013	58,501	+1,124
2014	58,529	+28
2015	60,221	+1,692
2016	65,188	+4,967
2017	65,064	−124
2018	80,290	+15,226
2019	90,445	+10,155
2020	100,776	+10,331
2021	106,422	+5,646
2022	102,897	−3,525
2023	103,275	+378
2024	103,498	+223
2025	107,079	+3,581
2026	115,324	+8,245

=== Attendance ===
The highest individual crowd to watch a West Coast game at Optus Stadium is 59,608 which was between West Coast and Melbourne in the preliminary final of 2018. The highest-attended home game at Subiaco Oval was against North Melbourne in the 2012 elimination final, which was attended by 41,790 people.

In 2011, 455,899 people attended West Coast home games, equating to an average of 37,992 people per game. In 2018, West Coast had the second highest home ground attendance of any AFL club, averaging 53,250 for its 11 home games (the highest was Richmond, which averaged 61,175). Following the COVID-19 pandemic and a period of team rebuilding, average home attendances fluctuated, recovering to 42,985 across the 2024 season.

The highest attendance for any game featuring West Coast was against Collingwood in the 2018 grand final at the Melbourne Cricket Ground, attended by 100,022 people. In terms of television audience, on average 519,000 people viewed West Coast Eagles games in 2011, with a high of 1,074,000 viewers for the round 16 game against Geelong.

=== Number one ticket holder ===
The number-one ticket holder is a position in most AFL clubs give to a well-known supporter of the club. West Coast's website lists "longevity of service", "passion for the club", "contribution to the community of Western Australia" and "the level at which they are recognised in their chosen profession by the community" as criteria for the position. Number-one ticket holders generally serve for two years.

== Club identity ==
=== Symbols and uniform ===
West Coast's official colours are royal blue and gold. The club had previously used navy blue in place of royal blue between 1995 and 2017, but returned to the club's original colours prior to the 2018 season.

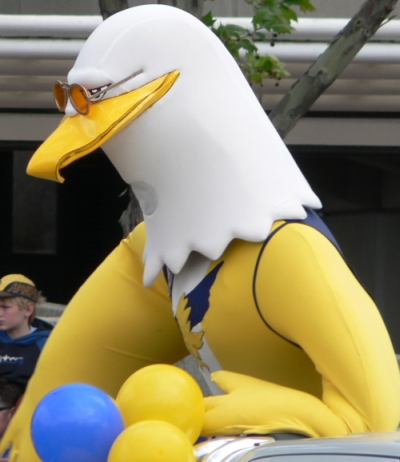
West Coast's eagle mascot Rick "The Rock"

The club's original logo, used from 1987 to 1999. An older shield variation of this logo also exists.

The club's logo used from 1 October 1999 to 1 November 2017

The club's current logo features the head of a wedge-tailed eagle in the royal blue and gold colours of the club with the words "West Coast Eagles" written underneath. It was introduced prior to the 2018 season and aimed to present a more realistic portrayal of an eagle than the previous logo. The previous logo, in use between 2000 and 2017, featured a more heavily stylised wedge-tailed eagle. The club's current and former logos have all features the eagle's head facing east (i.e. towards the right, where east appears on most maps) to represent the eagle eyeing off its prey in the Eastern States.

As part of the AFL's Mascot Manor program, a bald eagle club mascot, Rick "The Rock", was created in 2003 to promote the club to junior players. The mascot is in part named after the song. A real wedge-tailed eagle, Auzzie, has flown around the field before matches at West Coast home games since 2007.

In 2018, the Eagles' home guernsey saw a return of the club's former 'royal blue' design used prior to 1999, updated to feature the club's new logo. The club's away strip, which already used a variation of the design with the royal blue and gold colours swapped around, as updated to feature the new logo but otherwise remained relatively unchanged. Between 2000 and 2015, the club's home jumper design featured a stylised eagle on a tricolour of navy blue, white and gold. This jumper was introduced during the 2000 season along with a much-criticised ochre away jumper as part of a rebrand of the club to coincide with the new millennium. The ochre jumper was later dropped at the end of 2002 in favour of an updated version of the club's former royal blue jumper, which was worn during their 1992 and 1994 premierships. Starting in 2010, the Eagles also wore a third, predominantly white guernsey to avoid visual clashes with teams who used similar colours. It was dropped as the club's designated clash jumper at the end of 2016, in favour of an updated version of their original 1987 guernsey. During October 2015, the club announced a navy version of the royal blue jumper would replace the tricolour guernsey as the club's home uniform from 2016, and was used until the introduction of the current design. The Eagles rebranded to its current brand on 1 November 2017, ahead of the club's move to Perth Stadium from 2018.

=== Uniform evolution ===
West Coast's uniform changes throughout their history:

1987–1988	1988–1994	1995–99	2000–15	2016–17	2018–present

=== Sponsorship ===
Year	Kit Manufacturer	Major Sponsor	Shorts Sponsor	Bottom Back Sponsor	Top Back Sponsor	Neckline Sponsor
1987	Puma	Burswood	–	–	–	
1988–90	Puma	SGIO	–	–	–	
1991—93	Puma	SGIO (Home); Hungry Jack's (Away)	–	–	–	
1994–99	Puma	SGIO (Home); Hungry Jack's (Away)	Hungry Jack's (Home); SGIO (Away)	Hungry Jack's (Home); SGIO (Away)	–	
2000	Puma	SGIO	SGIO	SGIO	–	
2001	Puma	SGIO	NRMA	SGIO	–	
2002	Puma	SGIO	SGIO	SGIO	–	
2003	Puma	SGIO (Home); Hungry Jack's (Away)	SGIO	Hungry Jack's (Home); SGIO (Away)	–	
2004–08	Puma	SGIO (Home); Hungry Jack's (Away)	Hungry Jack's (Home); SGIO (Away)	Hungry Jack's (Home); SGIO (Away)	–	
2009–11	Puma	SGIO (Home); Hungry Jack's (Away)	Perth Precast	Hungry Jack's (Home); SGIO (Away)	–	
2012–13	Puma	SGIO (Home); Bankwest (Away)	Perth Precast	Bankwest (Home); SGIO (Away)	–	
2014	Puma	SGIO (Home); Bankwest (Away)	–	Bankwest (Home); SGIO (Away)	–	
2015	Puma	SGIO (Home); Bankwest (Away)	Raw Hire	Bankwest (Home); SGIO (Away)	–	
2016	Puma	SGIO (Home); Bankwest (Away)	Masters Milk	Bankwest (Home); SGIO (Away)	–	
2017	Puma	SGIO (Home); Bankwest (Away)	AGL Energy	Bankwest (Home); SGIO (Away)	–	
2018	ISC Sport	SGIO (Home); Hungry Jack's (Away)	AGL Energy	Hungry Jack's (Home); SGIO (Away)	–	
2019	ISC Sport	Hungry Jack's	AGL Energy	Lendi	–	
2020	ISC Sport	Hungry Jack's	AGL Energy	Lendi	BHP	
2021–22	Castore	Hungry Jack's	AGL Energy	Lendi	Audi Centre Perth	
2023–24	New Balance	Hungry Jack's	AGL Energy	Lendi	Audi Centre Perth	Caltex
2025	New Balance	Hungry Jack's	AGL Energy	MyPlace	Tyrepower	Caltex
2026	New Balance	Hungry Jack's	AGL Energy	MyPlace	Tyrepower	Allianz

As part of West Coast's (and the AFL's in general) efforts to develop the game outside of Australia, the club partners with a number of internationally based football clubs, providing them with guernseys and other equipment. There are currently Eagles-affiliated clubs (also referred to as "sister clubs") in Cambodia (the Cambodian Eagles), Canada (the Toronto Eagles), China (the Shanghai Eagles), Italy (the Milano Eagles), and Sweden (the Karlstad Eagles). West Coast is also responsible for sponsoring FootyWILD, a program similar to Auskick held in KwaZulu-Natal, a province of South Africa.

=== Song ===
The club's official team song is "We're the Eagles", composed by Kevin Peek, a former member of the progressive rock band Sky, and initially recorded at Peek's studio in Roleystone.

The original 1987 version, which was played after the 1992 and 1994 grand final victories, featured anti-Victorian verses ("For years, they took the best of us and claimed them for their own... So watch out, all you know-alls, all you wise men from the East") and a different musical structure. It was eventually altered in the late-1990s. The re-recorded version had new verses added by Ken Walther, who also composed Fremantle's 1995 team song. A modified version of the late-1990s song has been used from 2018 to 2019. Ahead of the Eagles' appearance in the 2015 Grand Final, the West Australian Symphony Orchestra created an orchestral version of the song. From 2020 to 2024, the club announced an updated version of the song, composed by Ian Berney and with vocals from Ian Kenny, both of Perth band Birds of Tokyo. As of 2025 the club reverted to their original 1990s version by Ken Walther. "Eagle Rock", a 1971 song recorded by Daddy Cool, is also traditionally played at home games after wins.

=== Headquarters, training and administration base ===
The West Coast Eagles had its original primary training and administration base at Subiaco Oval from 1987 until 2019, also during that period when Subiaco Oval was not available because the club had no permanent training base, they sometimes had to constantly shift between training grounds at McGillivray Oval, the Mount Lawley TAFE or a paddock out the back of Midland. The club then moved its primary training and administration base to Mineral Resources Park in 2019.

=== Home ground ===
The West Coast Eagles primary home ground has been Perth Stadium (commercially known as Optus Stadium) since 2018. Prior to this, the Eagles home ground was Subiaco Oval from 1987 until 2017, and the WACA Ground from 1987 until 2000.

== List of seasons ==
Year	No.	Coach	Captain	John Worsfold Medal	Leading goalkicker	Chris Mainwaring Medal (Best Clubman)	Emerging Talent Award
1987	8th	Ron Alexander	Ross Glendinning	Steve Malaxos	Ross Glendinning (38)	Glen Bartlett	Chris Mainwaring
1988	4th	John Todd	Ross Glendinning	John Worsfold	Ross Glendinning ^{(2)} (73)	Phil Scott	Guy McKenna
1989	11th	John Todd	Murray Rance	Guy McKenna	Peter Sumich (45)	Geoff Miles	Peter Sumich
1990	3rd	Mick Malthouse	Steve Malaxos	Chris Lewis	Peter Sumich ^{(2)} (90)	Phil Scott ^{(2)}	Dean Kemp
1991	1st	Mick Malthouse	John Worsfold	Craig Turley	Peter Sumich ^{(3)} (111)	Chris Waterman	Glen Jakovich
1992	4th	Mick Malthouse	John Worsfold	Dean Kemp	Peter Sumich ^{(4)} (82)	David Hynes	Matt Clape
1993	6th	Mick Malthouse	John Worsfold	Glen Jakovich; Don Pyke	Peter Sumich ^{(5)} (76)	John Worsfold	Drew Banfield
1994	1st	Mick Malthouse	John Worsfold	Glen Jakovich ^{(2)}	Peter Sumich ^{(6)} (49)	Guy McKenna	Shane Bond
1995	5th	Mick Malthouse	John Worsfold	Glen Jakovich ^{(3)}	Jason Ball (43)	Michael Brennan	Fraser Gehrig
1996	4th	Mick Malthouse	John Worsfold	Drew Banfield	Mitchell White (37)	Tony Evans	Andrew Donnelly
1997	5th	Mick Malthouse	John Worsfold	Peter Matera	Peter Sumich ^{(7)} (33)	Chris Mainwaring	Josh Wooden
1998	7th	Mick Malthouse	John Worsfold	Ashley McIntosh	Fraser Gehrig (42)	John Worsfold ^{(2)}	Phillip Read
1999	5th	Mick Malthouse	Guy McKenna	Guy McKenna ^{(2)}	Scott Cummings (95)	Dean Kemp	Laurie Bellotti
2000	13th	Ken Judge	Guy McKenna	Glen Jakovich ^{(4)}	Phil Matera (49)	Phil Matera	Darren Glass
2001	14th	Ken Judge	Ben Cousins and Dean Kemp	Ben Cousins	Troy Wilson (40)	Rowan Jones	Daniel Kerr
2002	8th	John Worsfold	Ben Cousins	Ben Cousins ^{(2)}	Phil Matera (46)	Drew Banfield	Chris Judd
2003	7th	John Worsfold	Ben Cousins	Ben Cousins ^{(3)}	Phil Matera (62)	Michael Braun	Ashley Sampi
2004	7th	John Worsfold	Ben Cousins	Chris Judd	Phil Matera (61)	Josh Wooden	Mark Seaby
2005	2nd	John Worsfold	Ben Cousins	Ben Cousins ^{(4)}	Phil Matera (38)	Andrew Embley	Ashley Hansen
2006	1st	John Worsfold	Chris Judd	Chris Judd ^{(2)}	Quinten Lynch (65)	Dean Cox	Jaymie Graham
2007	3rd	John Worsfold	Chris Judd	Darren Glass	Quinten Lynch (52)	Ashley Hansen	Matt Priddis
2008	15th	John Worsfold	Darren Glass	Dean Cox	Ben McKinley (42)	Jaymie Graham	Ben McKinley
2009	11th	John Worsfold	Darren Glass	Darren Glass ^{(2)}	Mark LeCras (58)	Beau Waters	Chris Masten
2010	16th	John Worsfold	Darren Glass	Mark LeCras	Mark LeCras (63)	Mark Nicoski	Nic Naitanui
2011	4th	John Worsfold	Darren Glass	Darren Glass ^{(3)}	Josh Kennedy (59)	Brett Jones	Luke Shuey
2012	5th	John Worsfold	Darren Glass	Scott Selwood	Jack Darling (53)	Mitch Brown	Jacob Brennan
2013	13th	John Worsfold	Darren Glass	Matt Priddis	Josh Kennedy (60)	Adam Selwood	Scott Lycett
2014	9th	Adam Simpson Jarrod Schofield (caretaker senior coach)	Darren Glass	Eric Mackenzie	Josh Kennedy (61)	Sam Butler	Jeremy McGovern
2015	2nd	Adam Simpson Jarrod Schofield (caretaker senior coach)	Shannon Hurn	Andrew Gaff	Josh Kennedy (80)	Josh Kennedy	Dom Sheed
2016	6th	Adam Simpson Jarrod Schofield (caretaker senior coach)	Shannon Hurn	Luke Shuey	Josh Kennedy (82)	Luke Shuey	Tom Barrass
2017	8th	Adam Simpson Jarrod Schofield (caretaker senior coach)	Shannon Hurn	Elliot Yeo	Josh Kennedy (69)	Mark Hutchings	Liam Duggan
2018	2nd	Adam Simpson Jarrod Schofield (caretaker senior coach)	Shannon Hurn	Elliot Yeo ^{(2)}	Jack Darling (48)	Lewis Jetta	Willie Rioli
2019	5th	Adam Simpson Jarrod Schofield (caretaker senior coach)	Shannon Hurn	Luke Shuey ^{(2)}	Jack Darling (59)	Fraser McInnes	Oscar Allen
2020	5th	Adam Simpson Jarrod Schofield (caretaker senior coach)	Luke Shuey	Nic Naitanui	Josh Kennedy (34)	Brad Sheppard	Josh Rotham
2021	9th	Adam Simpson Jarrod Schofield (caretaker senior coach)	Luke Shuey	Nic Naitanui ^{(2)}	Jack Darling (42)	Liam Duggan	Harry Edwards
2022	17th	Adam Simpson Jarrod Schofield (caretaker senior coach)	Luke Shuey	Tom Barrass	Josh Kennedy (37)	Oscar Allen	Brady Hough
2023	18th	Adam Simpson Jarrod Schofield (caretaker senior coach)	Luke Shuey	Tim Kelly	Oscar Allen (53)	Shannon Hurn	Reuben Ginbey
2024	16th	Adam Simpson Jarrod Schofield (caretaker senior coach)	Oscar Allen & Liam Duggan	Jeremy McGovern	Jake Waterman (53)	Liam Duggan	Harley Reid
2025	18th	Andrew McQualter	Oscar Allen & Liam Duggan	Liam Baker	Jamie Cripps (24)	Liam Duggan	Clay Hall

Denotes team finished runner-up
Denotes team won premiership
Denotes player won Coleman Medal

== Club honours ==
=== Club achievements ===
Premierships
Competition	Level	Wins	Years won
Australian Football League	Seniors	4	1992, 1994, 2006, 2018
Finishing positions
Australian Football League	Minor premiership (McClelland Trophy)	3	1991, 1994, 2006
Australian Football League	Grand Finalist	3	1991, 2005, 2015
Australian Football League	Wooden spoons	3	2010, 2023, 2025
AFL Women's	Wooden spoons	1	2022 (S6)
West Australian Football League	Wooden spoons	5	2021, 2022, 2023, 2024, 2025

=== Life members ===
Players who have played 150 games for the club are automatically inducted as life members of the club. Other players, administrators and coaches that have made an outstanding contribution to the club have also been inducted. No life members were inducted in 2001 or 2021. The following players, coaches and administrators are life members of the club:

Year of induction	Inductees
1994	Michael Brennan, Dwayne Lamb, Chris Lewis, Chris Mainwaring, John Worsfold (all players)
1995	David Hart, Guy McKenna (both players)
1996	Hank Gloede (property manager), Dean Kemp (player), Bill Sutherland (head trainer)
1997	Mick Malthouse (coach), Peter Matera, Peter Sumich, Chris Waterman (all players)
1998	Brett Heady, Glen Jakovich, Ashley McIntosh
1999	Murray McHenry (chairman)
2000	Drew Banfield, Mitchell White (both players)
2002	Ross Nicholas (marketing manager), Brian Edwards (manager), Ken Fitch, Rod Moore (both team doctors)
2003	Ben Cousins, Don Pyke (both players), Robert Wiley (player and coach)
2004	Karl Langdon, Phil Matera (both players), Trevor Nisbett (CEO)
2005	Michael Braun, Tony Evans, Peter Wilson (all players)
2006	Craig Turley, Ryan Turnbull, David Wirrpanda (all players), David Jones (board member)
2007	Chad Fletcher, Rowan Jones (both players), Brian Dawson (coach), Anna Durante (secretary), Tim Gepp (match committee chairman)
2008	Dean Cox, Andrew Embley, Darren Glass, Daniel Kerr, Phil Scott (all players)
2009	Dalton Gooding (chairman), Nigel Satterley (board member), Adam Hunter, Quinten Lynch (both players)
2010	Jeff Newman
2011	Adam Selwood (player), Richard Godfrey (chief operating officer), Glenn Stewart (High Performance Manager)
2012	Ian Miller, Trevor Woodhouse, John Adams
2013	Matt Priddis, Peter Souris, Chris Summers, Ken Godwin
2014	Shannon Hurn, Matt Rosa, Gary Greer
2015	Mark LeCras
2016	Chris Masten, Josh Kennedy, Sam Butler, Will Schofield, Neil Hamilton, Denis McInerney, Mick Moylan.
2017	Luke Shuey, Andrew Gaff, Jack Darling
2018	Nic Naitanui, Brad Sheppard, Chris Judd, David Hynes, Ross Glendinning.
2019	Chad Morrison, Mark Nicoski, Mark Hohnen, Richard Colless, Robert Armstrong
2020	Eric Mackenzie, Beau Waters, Jamie Cripps, Alan Cransberg
2022	Jeremy McGovern, Elliot Yeo, Michael Smith, Deane Pieters, Gary Stocks, David Grace QC

=== Team of the Decade ===
In 1996 as part of the AFL's centenary celebrations, and the club's 10-year celebrations, the Eagles named a team of the decade.

Backs:	David Hart	Michael Brennan	Ashley McIntosh
Half backs:	Guy McKenna	Glen Jakovich	John Worsfold
Centres:	Peter Matera	Dean Kemp	Chris Mainwaring
Half forwards:	Brett Heady	Mitchell White	Craig Turley
Forwards:	Chris Lewis	Peter Sumich	Tony Evans
Ruck:	Ryan Turnbull	Don Pyke	Dwayne Lamb
Interchange:	Chris Waterman	Steve Malaxos	Peter Wilson

=== Team 20 ===
In 2006 the West Coast Eagles named a greatest team of the past twenty years as part of the club's twentieth anniversary celebrations:

Backs:	David Wirrpanda	Ashley McIntosh	Michael Brennan
Half Backs:	Guy McKenna	Glen Jakovich	John Worsfold (Captain)
Centres:	Peter Matera	Dean Kemp	Chris Mainwaring
Half Forwards:	Brett Heady	Mitchell White	Chris Lewis
Forwards:	Phillip Matera	Peter Sumich	Tony Evans
Ruck:	Dean Cox	Chris Judd	Ben Cousins
Interchange:	Chris Waterman	Drew Banfield	Don Pyke
	Dwayne Lamb		
Coach:	Michael Malthouse		

=== Team 25 ===
In 2011 the West Coast Eagles named a greatest team of the past twenty five years as part of the club's twenty fifth anniversary celebrations:

Backs:	David Hart	Darren Glass	Michael Brennan
Half Backs:	Guy McKenna	Glen Jakovich	John Worsfold (Captain)
Centres:	Peter Matera	Ben Cousins	Chris Mainwaring
Half Forwards:	Brett Heady	Mitchell White	Chris Lewis
Forwards:	Phillip Matera	Peter Sumich	Tony Evans
Ruck:	Dean Cox	Dean Kemp	Chris Judd
Interchange:	Daniel Kerr	Ashley McIntosh	Don Pyke
	Andrew Embley		
Emergency	David Wirrpanda	Dwayne Lamb	Matt Priddis
Coach:	Michael Malthouse		

== Individual awards ==
=== Hall of Fame inductees ===
The Australian Football Hall of Fame was established in 1996:

- Ross Glendinning – 2000
- John Todd – 2003
- Peter Matera – 2006
- Dean Kemp – 2007
- Glen Jakovich – 2008
- Guy McKenna – 2009
- Dean Cox – 2020
- Chris Judd- 2021
- Robert Wiley- 2021
- Sam Mitchell- 2023

=== West Coast Eagles Hall of Fame inductees ===
- Bill Sutherland (trainer) 2011
- Chris Lewis (player) – 2011
- Peter Matera (player) – 2011
- Dean Kemp (player) – 2011
- Glen Jakovich (player) – 2011
- Guy McKenna (player) – 2011
- John Worsfold (player/coach) – 2011
- Mick Malthouse (coach) – 2011
- Michael Brennan (player) – 2014
- Brett Heady (player) – 2014
- Chris Mainwaring (player) – 2014
- Ashley McIntosh (player) – 2014
- Peter Sumich (player) – 2014
- Trevor Nisbett (administrator) – 2014
- Chris Judd (player) – 2021
- Darren Glass (player) – 2021
- Dean Cox (player) – 2021
- Mark LeCras (player) – 2023
- Matt Priddis (player) – 2023
- Phillip Matera (player) – 2023
- Don Pyke (player) – 2023

=== Brownlow Medal winners ===
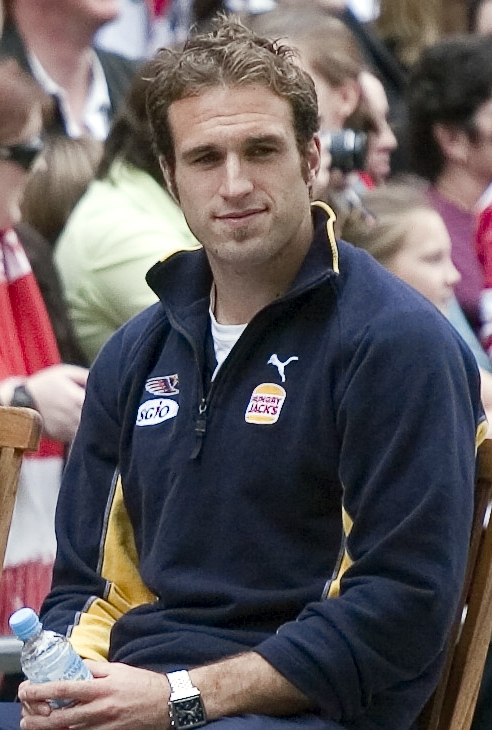
Chris Judd, winner of the 2004 Brownlow Medal

The Brownlow Medal is awarded to the best player in the competition during the home-and-away season as voted by the umpires:

Winners

- Chris Judd (2004)
- Ben Cousins (2005)
- Matt Priddis (2014)

Runners-up

- Craig Turley (1991)
- Peter Matera (1994, 1997)
- Ben Cousins (2003 (equal))
- Daniel Kerr (2005, 2007)
- Matt Priddis (2015)

=== AFLPA Awards ===
The Leigh Matthews Trophy is awarded to the best player in the competition as voted by the AFL Players Association:

- Ben Cousins – 2005
- Chris Judd – 2006

The Best Captain Award is awarded to the best captain as voted by the AFL Players Association:

- Ross Glendinning – 1988
- Shannon Hurn – 2019

The Best First-Year Player Award is awarded to the best first-year player as voted by the AFL Players Association:

- Daniel Kerr – 2001
- Chris Judd – 2002
- Harley Reid – 2024

=== Norm Smith Medal winners ===
The Norm Smith Medal is awarded to the player judged best-on-ground in the AFL Grand Final:

- Peter Matera – 1992
- Dean Kemp – 1994
- Chris Judd – 2005 (losing side)
- Andrew Embley – 2006
- Luke Shuey – 2018

=== Coleman Medal winners ===
The Coleman Medal is awarded to the player who kicks the most goals in the AFL competition during the home-and-away season:

- Scott Cummings (88 goals) – 1999
- Josh Kennedy (75 goals) – 2015
- Josh Kennedy (80 goals) – 2016

=== AFL Rising Star winners ===
The AFL Rising Star is awarded to the best rookie player in the competition during a particular season:

- Ben Cousins – 1996

=== Goal of the Year winners ===
The Goal of the Year is awarded to the player judged to have kicked the best goal during a particular season:

- Ben Cousins – 1999
- Mark Merenda – 2001
- Daniel Kerr – 2003
- Chris Judd – 2005
- Harley Reid – 2024

=== Mark of the Year winners ===
The Mark of the Year is awarded to the player judged to have taken the best mark during a particular season:

- Ashley Sampi – 2004
- Nic Naitanui – 2015
- Liam Ryan – 2019

=== All-Australian selection ===
The All-Australian team is a representative team consisting of the best players during a particular season. Prior to 1991 it was awarded to the best players in each interstate football carnival.

Year	Eagles Players & Coaches Selected
1987	Phil Narkle
1988	Steve Malaxos
1991	Guy McKenna, Chris Mainwaring, Peter Matera, Craig Turley, Mick Malthouse (coach)
1992	Dean Kemp
1993	Peter Matera, Guy McKenna
1994	Peter Matera, Guy McKenna, David Hart, Glen Jakovich
1995	Glen Jakovich
1996	Peter Matera, Chris Mainwaring, Mitchell White
1997	Peter Matera, Fraser Gehrig
1998	Ben Cousins, Ashley McIntosh
1999	Ben Cousins
2001	Ben Cousins
2002	Ben Cousins
2003	Michael Gardiner, Phil Matera
2004	Chad Fletcher, Chris Judd
2005	Ben Cousins (vice-captain), Dean Cox, David Wirrpanda
2006	Ben Cousins, Chris Judd, Dean Cox, Darren Glass, John Worsfold (coach)
2007	Dean Cox, Darren Glass, Daniel Kerr
2008	Dean Cox
2010	Mark LeCras
2011	Dean Cox, Darren Glass
2012	Dean Cox, Darren Glass (captain), Nic Naitanui, Beau Waters
2015	Matt Priddis, Josh Kennedy (vice-captain), Andrew Gaff
2016	Josh Kennedy, Jeremy McGovern
2017	Josh Kennedy (vice-captain), Jeremy McGovern, Elliot Yeo
2018	Shannon Hurn, Jeremy McGovern, Andrew Gaff, Adam Simpson (coach)
2019	Shannon Hurn (vice-captain), Jeremy McGovern, Elliot Yeo, Jack Darling
2020	Brad Sheppard, Nic Naitanui, Liam Ryan
2021	Nic Naitanui
2024	Jeremy McGovern, Jake Waterman

=== VFL Team of the Year ===
Prior to 1991 the VFL Team of the Year was announced each year, consisting of the best players during that season in the Victorian Football League.

Year	Eagles players selected
1987	Ross Glendinning
1988	John Worsfold
1989	Guy McKenna
1990	John Worsfold, Chris Lewis

== Players and staff ==
=== Squad ===
West Coast Eagles · AFL personnel
Playing list		Inactive list	Coaching staff
1 Willem Duursma; 2 Jake Waterman; 3 Liam Baker (c); 4 Brandon Starcevich; 5 Josh Lindsay; 6 Elliot Yeo; 7 Reuben Ginbey; 8 Elijah Hewett; 9 Harley Reid; 10 Heath Mellody; 11 Tim Kelly; 12 Sam Allen; 13 Noah Long; 14 Liam Duggan (c); 15 Jack Viney; 17 Jack Graham; 18 Tom McCarthy*; 19 Brady Hough; 20 Tylar Young; 21 Cooper Duff-Tytler; 22 Archer Reid; 23 Ryan Maric; 24 Trent Rivers; 25 Matt Flynn	26 Bo Allan; 27 Tom Gross; 28 Tom Cole; 30 Marcus Herbert*; 31 Lucca Grego; 32 Bailey Williams; 33 Rhett Bazzo; 35 Jobe Shanahan; 36 Tylah Williams; 37 Malakai Champion*; 38 Hamish Davis; 39 Fred Rodriguez*; 40 Deven Robertson; 41 Sandy Brock*; 42 Harry Edwards; 43 Tyrell Dewar; 44 Jack Hutchinson; 45 Finlay Macrae*; 46 Jacob Newton*; 47 Milan Murdock*; 49 Jake Miles-Wrency*; 50 Oliver Francou*; Harper Banfield; Jake Soutar		Senior coach: Andrew McQualter; Assistant coaches: Mitch Duncan (back line); Sam Radford (midfield); Luke Shuey (stoppages); Marco Bello (forward line); Shannon Hurn (development); Jacob Brennan (development); Kyal Horsley (development); Legend: (c) captain; * rookie; Updated: 22 November 2026; Sources: Players, coaches

=== Coaching staff ===
Coaching staff
Senior coach	Assistant coaches				Football Manager
Andrew McQualter appointed 2024	Matthew Knights appointed 2021	Daniel Pratt appointed 2015	Luke Webster appointed 2016	Jarrad Schofield appointed 2021	Gavin Bell appointed 2021
Development coaches				Strength and conditioning coach	WAFL coach
Kyal Horsley appointed 2019	Mark Nicoski appointed 2012	Jacob Brennan appointed 2020	Drew Petrie appointed 2018	Warren Kofoed appointed 2008	Robert Wiley appointed 2021

=== Club officials ===
Club officials
Chairman	Deputy chairman	chief executive officer	chief operating officer	chief financial officer
Paul Fitzpatrick appointed 2022	Elizabeth Gaines elected 2021	Don Pyke appointed 2024	Richard Godfrey appointed 2009	Peter Widdicombe appointed 2024
Directors
Justin Langer elected 2017	Ben Wyatt elected 2021	Terry Bowen elected 2017	Rowan Jones elected 2021	Nicole Moody elected 2021

== Rivalries ==
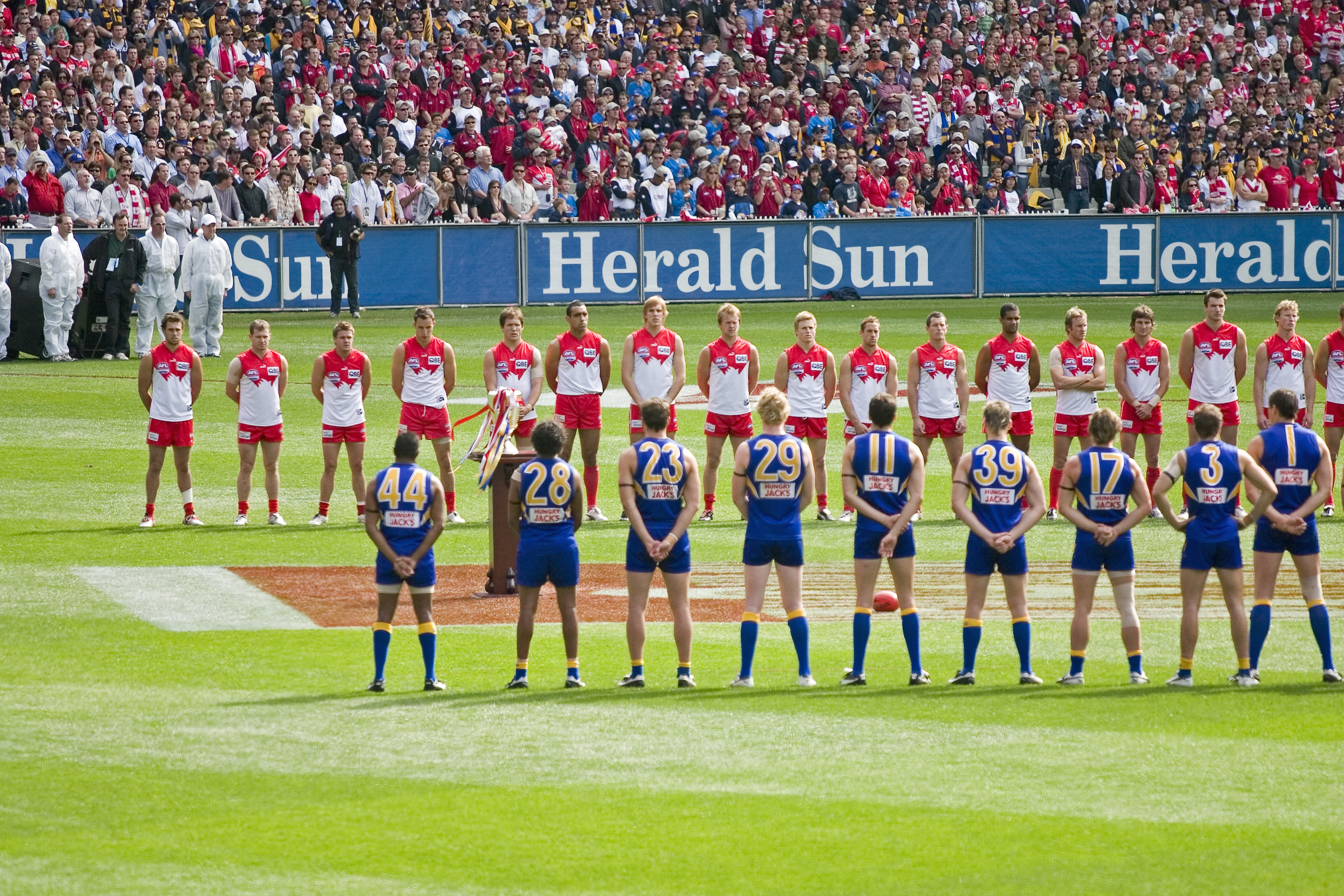
The West Coast Eagles and Sydney Swans line up for the national anthem at the 2005 Grand Final.

The club's strongest rivalry is with the Fremantle Football Club, the only other AFL club based in Western Australia. The two teams play-off in the Western Derby twice each home-and-away season. Overall, 62 derbies have been played, with the Eagles winning 33 and Fremantle winning 29. West Coast currently hold the record for the most consecutive derby wins after winning their 11th in a row in round 7 of the 2021 AFL season. Derbies usually incorporate a near sold-out crowd. From 1995 to 2017, when the club played at Subiaco Oval, the average crowd was 39,910 people per game, out of a total capacity of 43,600 people. From 2018 to 2021, the average crowd at Optus Stadium was 56,033 (excluding two games in 2020 and 2021 played with reduced or no crowd due to COVID-19 restrictions), out of a total capacity of 60,000 people.

The club's earliest rivalry was with VFL powerhouse the Hawthorn Hawks. This rivalry stemmed from a series of memorable matches in the early 1990s, most notably the 1991 Grand Final. It was considered the first ever interstate rivalry in the competition, although it had fallen into irrelevance in later years. 24 years later in 2015, the two clubs met again in another grand Final, which Hawthorn won in convincing fashion.

Other rivalries include with Essendon, and a rivalry with the Sydney Swans, which stems from a series of six matches between 2005 and 2007, including both the 2005 and 2006 Grand Finals, in which the total points difference was 13, the lowest of all time. This sequence included three one-point matches between the 2006 qualifying final and round one of the 2007 season.

== Game and ladder records ==
- Biggest winning margin: 135 points – 26.21 (177) vs. Adelaide 5.12 (42), Subiaco Oval, 13 August 1995
- Biggest losing margin: 171 points – 5.4 (34) vs. Sydney 31.19 (205), SCG, 24 June 2023
- Biggest winning margin in a final: 96 points – 24.18 (162) vs. North Melbourne 9.12 (66), EF, Subiaco Oval, 9 September 2012
- Biggest losing margin in a final: 77 points – 8.19 (67) vs. Essendon 22.12 (144), SF, MCG, 14 September 1996
- Biggest winning streak: 12 games – R1, 1991 to R13, 1991
- Biggest losing streak: 16 games – R3, 2023 to R19, 2023
- Highest score: 29.18 (192) vs. Brisbane Bears, W.A.C.A., 17 April 1988
- Lowest score: 1.12 (18) vs. Essendon, Windy Hill, 15 July 1989
- Highest score conceded: 31.19 (205) vs. Sydney, S.C.G., 24 June 2023
- Lowest score conceded: 2.8 (20) vs. Melbourne, Subiaco Oval, 24 March 1991
- Highest aggregate score: 295 points – Carlton 29.17 (191) vs. West Coast Eagles 15.14 (104), Princes Park, 18 April 1987
- Lowest aggregate score: 76 points – Footscray 7.11 (53) vs. West Coast Eagles 3.5 (23), Whitten Oval, 23 August 1992
- Most goals in a match: Scott Cummings, 14 goals vs. Adelaide, W.A.C.A., 1 April 2000
- Highest crowd: 100,022 vs. Collingwood, MCG, 29 September 2018
- Lowest crowd: 210 vs. Adelaide, The Gabba, 11 July 2020
- Highest WA crowd: 59,608 vs. Melbourne, Optus Stadium, 22 September 2018
- Lowest WA crowd: 12,715 vs. North Melbourne, Hands Oval, 8 June 2025
- Highest home-and-away season crowd: 90,028 vs. Collingwood, MCG, 23 May 2026

=== VFL/AFL finishing positions (1987–present) ===
Finishing Position	Year (Finals in Bold)	Tally
1st (Premiers)	**1992**, **1994**, **2006**, **2018**	4
2nd (Runner up )	**1991**, **2005**, **2015**	3
3rd	**1990**	1
4th	**1993**, **2011**	2
5th	**1988**, **1996**, **2007**, **2012**	4
6th	**1995**, **1997**, **1999**, **2017**, **2019**	5
7th	**1998**, **2016**, **2020**	3
8th	1987, **2002**, **2003**, **2004**	4
9th	2014, 2021	2
10th	nil	0
11th	1989, 2009	2
12th	nil	0
13th	2000, 2013	2
14th	2001	1
15th	2008	1
16th	2010, 2024	2
17th	2022	1
18th	2023,2025	2

=== Head-to-head record ===
Played:796 Won: 453 Drawn: 6 Lost:337 (Last updated – End of 2025 AFL season)

		GP	W	D	L
1	Adelaide	58	30	0	28
2	Brisbane Bears	16	13	1	2
3	Brisbane Lions	55	35	1	19
4	Carlton	53	26	0	27
5	Collingwood	62	31	1	30
6	Essendon	62	27	0	35
7	Fitzroy	15	9	0	6
8	Fremantle	61	33	0	28
9	Geelong	60	27	1	32
10	Gold Coast	19	11	1	7
11	Greater Western Sydney	18	10	0	8
12	Hawthorn	58	30	0	28
13	Melbourne	61	38	0	23
14	North Melbourne	57	31	0	26
15	Port Adelaide	40	16	0	24
16	Richmond	53	28	0	25
17	St Kilda	57	33	1	23
18	Sydney	57	22	0	35
19	Western Bulldogs	62	37	1	24

West Coast Eagles Football Club finals series match record
Opponent	Played	Won	Lost	Draw	Most recent final
Adelaide	4	2	2	0	2006 Preliminary Final Win
Carlton	3	2	1	0	2011 Semi-final Win
Collingwood	9	3	5	1	2020 Elimination Final Loss
Essendon	6	1	5	0	2019 Elimination Final Win
Geelong	6	4	2	0	2019 Semi-final Loss
GWS	1	0	1	0	2017 Semi-final Loss
Hawthorn	5	2	3	0	2015 Grand Final Loss
Melbourne	5	4	1	0	2018 Preliminary Final Win
North Melbourne	5	3	2	0	2015 Preliminary Final Win
Port Adelaide	2	1	1	0	2017 Elimination Final Win
Sydney	5	2	3	0	2006 Grand Final Win
Western Bulldogs	4	2	2	0	2016 Elimination Final Loss
Overall	55	26 (48%)	28 (51%)	1 (2%)	

== Reserves team ==
West Coast Eagles

Names
- Full name: West Coast Eagles Football Club

2025 season
- Home-and-away season: 10th
- Leading goalkicker: Jack Williams

Club details
- Founded: 2019 (as a reserves side)
- Competition: WAFL
- Coach: Kyal Horsley
- Captain: Callum Jamieson
- Premierships: 0
- Ground: Mineral Resources Park (6,500)
- Training ground: Mineral Resources Park

Uniforms
Home

The West Coast reserves are the reserves team of the club, playing in the West Australian Football League.

=== History ===
West Coast never competed in the VFL/AFL reserves. In 1999, the entered into a host-club arrangement with the Claremont Football Club. The affiliation only lasted a year, and from 2000 until 2001 the Eagles were aligned with the Perth Football Club.

From 2012 until 2013, the WAFL clubs voted to end host-club arrangements, and the Eagles (as well as Fremantle) returned to an affiliation with the entire WAFL.

A host-club arrangement returned in 2014 with the Eagles in an alignment with the East Perth Football Club, but it ended at the end of the 2018 season when the Eagles chose to field a stand-alone reserves team.

The reserves side initially had success, finishing fourth at the end of the 2019 season. They did not compete in 2020 because of the AFL's COVID-19 protocols, but returned in 2021, fishing last.

West Coast only managed a single win in 2022. In 2023, the side suffered five losses of 100 points or more in the first 12 rounds of the season, with informal talks held about a possible forfeit of their game against Subiaco, although this did not happen. Their 19-game losing streak ended in round 13 after a draw against Perth.

== AFL Women's team ==
In September 2017, West Coast Eagles were granted a licence by the AFL to compete in the AFL Women's league from the start of the 2020 season. The club shares home games between Lathlain Park, Perth Stadium and Leederville Oval.

== See also ==
- Australian rules football in Western Australia
- List of West Coast Eagles coaches
- List of West Coast Eagles players
- List of West Coast Eagles records
