= 1991 AFL finals series =

1991 Australian rules football tournament

The 1991 Australian Football League finals series was the 95th annual edition of the VFL/AFL final series, the Australian rules football play-off tournament staged to determine the winner of the 1991 AFL Premiership season. The series ran over four weekends in September 1991, culminating with the 1991 AFL Grand Final at Waverley Park on 28 September 1991.

The McIntyre final five system, which had operated from 1972 until 1990, was replaced by the first McIntyre final six system. The following season, it was replaced by the second McIntyre final six system.

== Bracket ==
Qualifying final
Sep 8, Subiaco Oval
West Coast	15.11 (101)
Hawthorn	18.16 (124)
Elimination finals
Sep 7, Waverley Park
Melbourne	17.11 (113)
Essendon	11.9 (75)
Sep 8, Waverley Park
Geelong	15.14 (104)
St Kilda	14.13 (97)

Semifinals
Sep 14, Waverley Park
Hawthorn	13.17 (95)
Geelong	13.15 (93)
Sep 15, Waverley Park
West Coast	17.15 (117)
Melbourne	12.7 (79)

Preliminary final
Sep 21, Waverley Park
Geelong	8.16 (64)
West Coast	11.13 (79)

Grand final
Sep 28, Waverley Park
Hawthorn	20.19 (139)
West Coast	13.8 (86)

== Venues ==
In terms of venues, the 1991 AFL finals series was historically significant for two reasons. First, due to ongoing construction of the Great Southern Stand at the MCG, all but one of the matches of the 1991 AFL finals series were contested at Waverley Park. This was the first time since 1945 that a VFL/AFL finals series was not played at the MCG. Second, the Qualifying final at Subiaco Oval marked the first time a VFL/AFL final had been played outside of Victoria.

== Week one (qualifying and elimination finals) ==
=== First Elimination final (Melbourne vs Essendon) ===
The opening match of the 1991 AFL finals series saw fifth-placed Melbourne play sixth-placed Essendon in the First Elimination final at Waverley Park. This marked the 14th VFL/AFL final between the two clubs, having previously met in the 1959 VFL Grand Final, which was won by Melbourne. They had also met in Grand Finals in 1941, 1946, 1948 (with the third game resulting in the first drawn VFL Grand Final) and 1957, with Melbourne winning all except the 1946 decider.

Teams

Melbourne	Essendon

Melbourne
B:	5 Earl Spalding	41 Peter Rohde	8 Graeme Yeats
HB:	21 Steven Febey	3 Garry Lyon (c)	17 Brett Lovett
C:	48 Darren Cuthbertson	29 Andrew Obst	18 Steven Stretch
HF:	15 Stephen Tingay	19 Darren Bennett	14 Rod Grinter
F:	16 Andy Lovell	13 Allen Jakovich	27 Sean Wight
Foll:	11 Jim Stynes (vc)	12 Todd Viney	24 Luke Beveridge
Int:	25 Simon Eishold	23 Kevin Dyson	
Coach:	John Northey		

Essendon
B:	45 Shane Heard	5 Terry Daniher	22 Ed Considine
HB:	10 Gary O'Donnell	30 Kevin Walsh	26 Mark Thompson (vc)
C:	11 Greg Anderson	9 Derek Kickett	17 Kieran Sporn
HF:	4 Gavin Wanganeen	32 Tim Watson (c)	12 Craig O'Brien
F:	27 Simon Madden	24 Michael Werner	13 Michael Long
Foll:	3 Paul Salmon	8 Darren Bewick	15 Alan Ezard
Int:	38 Paul Hills	39 David Johnston	
Coach:	Kevin Sheedy		

Essendon lost Salmon before the match with groin and ankle strains, and was replaced in the side by Peter Somerville. There were no late changes to the Melbourne team.

==== Match summary ====
After Essendon had the better of the first half, Melbourne kicked thirteen goals to four in the second half to advance to the first semi-final. Allen Jakovich was on fire for the Demons with eight goals.

Scorecard

First elimination final
7 September 1991 (2:08 p.m.)	Melbourne	def.	Essendon	Waverley Park (crowd: 46,032)	Report
1.2 (8); 4.5 (29); 10.7 (67); 17.11 (113)	Q1; Q2; Q3; Final	5.6 (36); 7.7 (49); 9.9 (63); 11.9 (75)	Umpires: Vernon, Sheehan; Television broadcast: Seven Network
Jakovich 8 Lovell 4 Beveridge 2 Spalding, Stynes, Viney 1	Goals	4 Werner; 2 Watson; 1 Daniher, Kickett, Greg Anderson, Sporn, Hills
Jakovich, Stynes, Lovell, Viney, Lovett, Lyon	Best	Anderson, Ezard, Kickett, Bewick, Werner
This win marked Melbourne's fifth consecutive VFL/AFL Elimination final win.

=== Second Elimination final (Geelong vs St Kilda) ===
The Second Elimination final saw third placed Geelong play fourth placed St Kilda at Waverley Park. Grand finalists two seasons prior, the Cats bounced back from a disappointing 1990, jumping into the Top Six after an important 40-point win against Hawthorn in Round 12 and spending much of the latter half of the season in second place behind West Coast. The Saints were the feel-good story of 1991, putting a difficult decade behind them and qualifying for their first VFL/AFL finals series since 1973. This was the second VFL/AFL final between the two clubs, having previously met in the 1968 First Semi-final, which was won by Geelong.

==== Teams ====
Geelong made some late changes to its team, as Damian Bourke (calf injury) and Tim Darcy (sore ankle) were ruled unavailable; their places were taken by Stephen Hooper and Mark Neeld. There were no late changes for St Kilda. The Cats still boasted a number of players in their team from the 1989 VFL Grand Final while the Saints had only three players in their team with finals experience, albeit with other clubs: Russell Morris, Stephen Newport and Tim Pekin.

Geelong	St Kilda

Geelong
B:	1 Steve Hocking	20 Andrew Rogers	28 Tim Darcy
HB:	27 Andrew Bews	34 Trevor Spencer	29 Ken Hinkley
C:	24 Trevor Poole	5 Gary Ablett	39 Jamie Lamb
HF:	37 Sean Simpson	26 Barry Stoneham (vc)	45 Andrew Wills
F:	19 Neville Bruns	16 Billy Brownless	3 Mark Bairstow
Foll:	30 Damian Bourke	7 Paul Couch	32 Garry Hocking
Int:	18 Sean Denham	12 Spiro Malakellis	
Coach:	Malcolm Blight		

St Kilda
B:	26 Kain Taylor	2 Danny Frawley (c)	10 Paul Harding
HB:	41 Tim Pekin	12 Russell Morris	6 David Grant
C:	35 Robert Harvey	1 Stephen Newport	29 Nathan Burke
HF:	15 Frank Coghlan	23 Stewart Loewe	7 Nicky Winmar
F:	37 Dean Rice	4 Tony Lockett	5 Gilbert McAdam
Foll:	50 Lazar Vidovic	27 Dean Greig	14 Danny Craven
Int:	44 Craig Devonport	19 Ricky Nixon	
Coach:	Ken Sheldon		

==== Match summary ====
Although Geelong had opted to kick with the wind first, it was St Kilda who opened the scoring, to the delight of their long-suffering supporters. After three misses, Gilbert McAdam kicked truly on the run from 40 metres at the 9-minute mark. Frank Coghlan and Tony Lockett added further majors soon after to push the Saints' lead to 21 points at the 12-minute mark, with the Cats still not having registered a score.
Bill Brownless finally got Geelong on the scoreboard at the 14-minute mark, with a long set shot resulting in a behind. However, Russell Morris' short kick-in did not reach Lazar Vidovic in the back pocket, and the resulting pressure allowed Sean Denham to swoop on the ball and score the Cats' first goal from a tight angle.
After the slow start, Geelong's midfield took control and with quick goals to Brownless (two) and veteran Neville Bruns, the Cats had seized the lead at the 18-minute mark. Lockett then had two chances to regain the lead for St Kilda but missed both set shots, the second one from barely ten metres. He would later blame himself for the Saints' loss. Soon after, Brownless added his third for the quarter to give Geelong a ten-point lead at the first change.

In the second quarter, the Saints took full advantage of the breeze, kicking six unanswered goals to open up a 26-point lead. As in the opening term, McAdam kicked the first goal before Lockett went on a rampage, booting the next five goals (it would have been six if he had marked in the goal square from another brilliant pass by Nicky Winmar, just after kicking his sixth goal for the game) before Garry Hocking slammed through a much-needed goal for Geelong at the 27-minute mark. When the siren sounded for the main break several minutes later, the Saints held a 19-point lead.

Momentum swung back and forth in a pulsating third quarter. With their season on the line, the Cats hit back hard; their defensive pressure lifted, Garry Hocking was pivotal in numerous attacking thrusts, and Brownless began reimposing himself up front.
After a long set shot from Brownless hit the post, Denham was in the perfect position to crumb and snap the first goal of the second half. Brownless then converted consecutive set shots, and when Hocking snapped his second, Geelong had regained the lead by seven points.
St Kilda then scored the next three goals - through successive goals to Lockett and one awarded to Ricky Nixon which Geelong defenders protested was touched - to take back a 10-point lead with 8 minutes remaining in the term. Both coaches had made a number of positional changes; Blight dragged Ablett, who had been ineffective, moved Trevor Spencer off Lockett and replaced him with Barry Stoneham, who had kept Stewart Loewe quiet, while Sheldon shifted Loewe into defence on Brownless and Paul Harding was relocated to centre half-forward to oppose Spencer at centre half-back.
The lead changed hands as Lockett registered his ninth goal, but when Brownless won a free kick against Saints skipper Danny Frawley and got his seventh major, the Cats took a one-point lead into the last change after Loewe's rushed shot from 50 metres drifted wide on the siren.

The last quarter was a tense and scrappy affair as tired players from both sides struggled to gain the advantage. Seven minutes had elapsed before Lockett had the first clear scoring chance of the term, which would have been his tenth goal for the match. Since the second quarter, he had kicked eight goals straight, but on this occasion a hooked set shot registered his fifth behind. After another rushed behind levelled the scores, the Cats worked the ball downfield where Paul Couch, who had been well tagged by Danny Craven, received a handball from Brownless and kicked truly from 50 metres to regain the lead. When Brownless slotted his eighth with nine minutes remaining, Geelong was in front by 13 points and looked home.
St Kilda's hopes lifted briefly when Loewe finally scored his first goal with a magnificent kick from outside 50 to bring the margin back to eight points with six minutes left. Three minutes later, Dean Rice collected the ball in open space, but his running shot missed and would end up being the last score of the game. Any remaining hope the Saints had all but disappeared when Vidovic not only had a free kick for a mark reversed but was also reported by two umpires for striking Ken Hinkley, apparently in retaliation after copping some unwanted physical attention from Hinkley. From there, the Cats controlled the ball in their attacking half, running down the clock until the final siren sounded to end an enthralling contest.

After the game, both coaches praised the other team's efforts and commented on the nature of the Final Six system:

I was brought up with the fact that if you are in finals, you are only in them to win. One of the sides had to go and it's really a pity it was us. We take defeat on the chin and we learn from it, and we'll come out a better side next season. [...] It is to Geelong's credit that they will be participating further. They played a good brand of football and I think if they play like that they will give all the sides a run for their money andn they could nearly take it (the premiership) out.

— Ken Sheldon,

They (St Kilda) were terrific. Our strengths that should have been were not, and their players around the middle cut us to pieces and they gave Lockett tremendous chances. We had to turn the game around at half-time. It was a great last quarter from us - a real gutsy win. [...] It's almost criminal one side is out of it and we have two chances. The stakes are high. It's up to the football people to make sure that everybody gets a reasonable go at it (the premiership). I don't quite know if it's right.

— Malcolm Blight,

Scorecard

Second Elimination Final
8 September 1991 (2:08 p.m.)	Geelong	def.	St Kilda	Waverley Park (crowd: 63,796)	Report
5.3 (33); 6.6 (42); 13.10 (88); 15.14 (104)	Q1; Q2; Q3; Final	3.5 (23); 9.7 (61); 13.9 (87); 14.13 (97)	Umpires: Cameron, Sawers; Television broadcast: Seven Network
Brownless 8 Bruns, Denham, G Hocking 2 Couch 1	Goals	9 Lockett; 2 McAdam; 1 Coghlan, Loewe, Nixon
Brownless, G Hocking, Stoneham, Bruns, Poole, Bairstow	Best	Lockett, Winmar, Harvey, McAdam, Craven, Devonport
Malakellis (shoulder), Bourke (calf), Darcy (ankle)	Injuries	Grant (concussion), Burke (corked thigh)
Nil	Reports	Vidovic (striking)

=== Qualifying Final (West Coast vs Hawthorn) ===
The Qualifying Final saw minor premier West Coast host second-placed Hawthorn at Subiaco Oval. Not only was it the first VFL/AFL final to be played outside of Victoria, it was also the first time the two clubs had met in a VFL/AFL final. The Hawks had qualified for their tenth consecutive VFL/AFL finals series, while the Eagles had built on their third-placed finish in 1990 and won the first 12 games of 1991 to eventually finish three games clear on top of the ladder. The sides had met twice during the season - in Round 7 at Princes Park and Round 22 at Subiaco Oval - with West Coast winning both games. The build-up of excitement during the week leading up to the match resulted in Perth being dubbed 'Eagle City'.

==== Teams ====
West Coast	Hawthorn

West Coast
B:	10 Don Pyke	14 Michael Brennan (vc)	53 Ashley McIntosh
HB:	17 Guy McKenna	48 Glen Jakovich	24 John Worsfold (c)
C:	2 Dean Kemp	28 Chris Lewis	30 Peter Matera
HF:	1 Brett Heady	19 Karl Langdon	7 Craig Turley
F:	20 Paul Peos	4 Peter Sumich	13 Scott Watters
Foll:	34 Dean Irving	5 Dwayne Lamb	36 David Hart
Int:	39 Chris Waterman	9 Peter Wilson	
Coach:	Mick Malthouse		

Hawthorn
B:	17 Michael Tuck (c)	24 Chris Langford	7 Gary Ayres (vc)
HB:	1 Ray Jencke	2 Chris Mew	16 Andrew Gowers
C:	18 Darrin Pritchard	11 Darren Jarman	15 Ben Allan
HF:	6 Tony Hall	23 Dermott Brereton	3 Anthony Condon
F:	13 Paul Dear	19 Jason Dunstall	4 Andrew Collins
Foll:	12 Stephen Lawrence	33 Paul Hudson	44 John Platten
Int:	10 Chris Wittman	35 James Morrissey	
Coach:	Alan Joyce		

==== Match summary ====
This historic occasion was also reflected in the attendance as over 44,000 spectators crammed into Subiaco Oval, a figure which remains the venue's attendance record for a VFL/AFL match. (Note: Subiaco Oval was discontinued as an AFL venue after the 2017 AFL season, and while the stands have been demolished, the oval is still used. The highest recorded attendance was over 52,000 for the 1979 WANFL Grand Final.) Leading up to the match, there had been criticism about the condition of Subiaco's playing surface, which had not been helped by the playing of two WAFL finals there the previous day. Furthermore, rain had been forecast to sweep through Perth on match day, however both coaches dismissed weather and conditions as an influential factor.

Urged on by a parochial home crowd confident of a repeat result from Round 22, the Eagles threw everything at Hawthorn, but in a frenetic opening term the battle-hardened Hawks matched the home side blow for blow, with the lead changing hands seven times. When the dust settled for quarter time the Eagles led by only five points.

The forecast rain arrived in the second quarter, turning an already rough playing surface into a boggy mess. Even though Hawthorn lost key forward Dermott Brereton in the 12th minute with what appeared a serious knee injury (later diagnosed as a strained medial ligament), Paul Dear proved to be a more than handy replacement. In a prelude to his Grand Final performance, Dear's mobility gave Hawthorn extra options in attack, while his strong marking and aggression at every contest brought his on-ball teammates into the game as the Hawks gradually wrestled control. At half-time they had kicked more accurately,

In his report for The Age the following day, chief football writer Ron Carter noted that "[t]he perseverance and non-stop aggression at the ball in winning the qualifying final in Perth was reminiscent of the Hawks of old."

Scorecard

Qualifying Final
8 September 1991 (3:00 p.m. AWST)	West Coast	def. by	Hawthorn	Subiaco Oval (crowd: 44,142)	Report
6.3 (39); 7.4 (46); 11.9 (75); 15.11 (101)	Q1; Q2; Q3; Final	5.4 (34); 8.9 (57); 12.12 (84); 18.16 (124)	Umpires: Russo, Goldspink
Sumich 3 Lewis, Wilson 2 Heady, Kemp, Langdon, Matera, McIntosh, Turley, Waterman 1	Goals	4 Dunstall; 3 Hudson; 2 Dear, Jarman, Platten; 1 Allan, Brereton, Condon, Lawrence, Lawrence
Turley, McKenna, Matera, Waterman, Watters, Lewis	Best	Lawrence, Condon, Platten, Pritchard, Allan, Dear
Nil	Injuries	Brereton (strained medial ligament)
Nil	Reports	Nil

== Week two (Semi-finals) ==
=== First Semi-final (West Coast v Melbourne) ===
The First Semi-final saw West Coast travel to Waverley to host Melbourne on Sunday 15 September. This was the third time both sides had met in a final, with the ledger standing at one win each. It was also the second consecutive year the two teams had met in the first semi-final.

Teams

West Coast	Melbourne

West Coast
B:	17 Guy McKenna	14 Michael Brennan (vc)	10 Don Pyke
HB:	39 Chris Waterman	48 Glen Jakovich	24 John Worsfold (c)
C:	7 Craig Turley	13 Scott Watters	30 Peter Matera
HF:	1 Brett Heady	53 Ashley McIntosh	2 Dean Kemp
F:	28 Chris Lewis	4 Peter Sumich	19 Karl Langdon
Foll:	34 Dean Irving	5 Dwayne Lamb	36 David Hart
Int:	45 Andrew Lockyer	9 Peter Wilson	
Coach:	Mick Malthouse		

Melbourne
B:	8 Graeme Yeats	41 Peter Rohde	5 Earl Spalding
HB:	17 Brett Lovett	30 Paul Bryce	29 Andrew Obst
C:	21 Steven Febey	37 David Flintoff	15 Stephen Tingay
HF:	18 Steven Stretch	3 Garry Lyon (c)	48 Darren Cuthbertson
F:	16 Andy Lovell	13 Allen Jakovich	19 Darren Bennett
Foll:	11 Jim Stynes	12 Todd Viney	24 Luke Beveridge
Int:	25 Simon Eishold	23 Kevin Dyson	
Coach:	John Northey		

==== Match summary ====
Again, it was a step too far for Melbourne, with the Eagles winning comfortably.

Scorecard

First Semi-final
15 September 1991	West Coast	def.	Melbourne	Waverley Park (crowd: 41,136)	Report
2.4 (16); 7.6 (48); 12.13 (85); 17.15 (117)	Q1; Q2; Q3; Final	4.2 (26); 5.4 (34); 8.4 (52); 12.7 (79)	Umpires: Chris Mitchell, Bryan Sheehan; Television broadcast: Seven Network
Heady, Irving, Sumich, Wilson 3 Hart, Jakovich, Kemp, Lewis, Turley	Goals	Jakovich 4 Rohde 2 Beveridge, Cuthbertson, Spalding, Stynes, Viney

=== Second Semi-final (Hawthorn v Geelong) ===
The Second Semi-final saw Hawthorn host Geelong at Waverley Park on Saturday 14 September. This was the fourth finals meeting between both sides, with Geelong holding a 2–1 advantage. Their previous finals meeting was the unforgettable 1989 VFL Grand Final, which Hawthorn had won by six points. During the 1991 AFL season, the two sides had met in Round 12, with Geelong emerging victorious by 40 points.

Teams

Hawthorn made only one change to the team that had beaten West Coast, with Robran in for the injured Brereton. Geelong made three changes, two of which were forced - with Gary Ablett Sr. suspended and Spiro Malakellis out for the rest of the finals due to a shoulder injury, while the serviceable ruckman Stephen Hooper made way for Damian Bourke, who had been a late withdrawal the previous week. Tim Darcy, the other late withdrawal, was also reinstated, along with young half-forward Michael Mansfield.

Hawthorn	Geelong

Hawthorn
B:	7 Gary Ayres (vc)	24 Chris Langford	4 Andrew Collins
HB:	17 Michael Tuck (c)	2 Chris Mew	1 Ray Jencke
C:	16 Andrew Gowers	15 Ben Allan	18 Darrin Pritchard
HF:	33 Paul Hudson	13 Paul Dear	6 Tony Hall
F:	11 Darren Jarman	19 Jason Dunstall	35 James Morrissey
Foll:	12 Stephen Lawrence	3 Anthony Condon	44 John Platten
Int:	25 Matthew Robran	8 Dean Anderson	
Coach:	Alan Joyce		

Geelong
B:	22 Mark Neeld	20 Andrew Rogers	28 Tim Darcy
HB:	1 Steve Hocking	34 Trevor Spencer	24 Trevor Poole
C:	37 Sean Simpson	7 Paul Couch	19 Neville Bruns
HF:	45 Andrew Wills	26 Barry Stoneham (vc)	29 Ken Hinkley
F:	18 Sean Denham	16 Billy Brownless	27 Andrew Bews (c)
Foll:	30 Damian Bourke	3 Mark Bairstow	32 Garry Hocking
Int:	21 Michael Mansfield	39 Jamie Lamb	
Coach:	Malcolm Blight		

==== Match summary ====
The match took place in perfect conditions. Hawthorn were playing with a slight breeze advantage, and in an eventful first quarter, Hall kicked the Hawks' first two goals before being stretchered off at the 20-minute mark of the term when Hinkley hit him with an elbow to the back of the head after Hinkley had handpassed the ball. Although not reported at the time of the incident, the AFL Tribunal would later suspend Hinkley for three weeks using trial by video. Hawthorn's wasteful accuracy in front of goal threatened to undo its good work around the ground; only one goal had been generated from their first six scoring shots before former captain and veteran midfielder Bruns kicked Geelong's first goal against the run of play. Moments later, key forward Brownless was reported by field umpire Dore for striking Hawthorn captain Tuck with what appeared an innocuous clip around the collarbone area. The Cats closed the margin to four points when Garry Hocking finished off a desperate passage of play with a left-foot snap, but thereafter the Hawks controlled the rest of the quarter. Again their poor finishing let them down, only adding one more goal through Hudson and six further behinds to take a 16-point lead into the first change.
Geelong struggled to make inroads in the second quarter as Hawthorn went into the main break having extended their advantage by a mere point. Hudson had a chance just before the siren to extend the lead to 23 points, but his set shot sailed out of bounds. Brownless had kicked two of the Cats' three goals in the quarter but was clearly hampered by hamstring problems. With Ablett out suspended, Geelong's coaching staff were forced to make a number of positional changes to rectify their problems in attack.
The Cats were first on the scoreboard in the second half when Garry Hocking kicked his second goal at the 3-minute mark. He had just taken a running shot at goal which had missed, but was pushed in the back after his kick by Allan, and duly converted the subsequent free kick. Hawthorn replied when Dear kicked his second goal after five minutes of end-to-end action, but with Bairstow and Poole starting to get their hands on the ball and send it repeatedly into attack with long kicks, Geelong finally managed to string together successive goals. When the versatile Stoneham took a juggling mark and kicked truly at the 15-minute mark, the Cats had taken the lead for the first time that afternoon. Brownless, who had struggled with hamstring problems for several months and had been labouring against Langford, finally hobbled off and would not return. Hawthorn regained the lead when Dunstall, well held by Rogers, kicked his first goal, but the Cats answered quickly through goals to the lively Neeld and Bruns to lead by eight points. But the battle-hardened Hawks hit back when Dunstall and Robran goaled against the run of play to level the scores. Mansfield's set shot after the siren drifted wide to give Geelong a one-point lead at the last change.
The final term was a tense and physical affair. Hawthorn took back the lead through goals to Dunstall and Pritchard. The game was then held up for several minutes, as Hinkley was stretchered off with concussion and a broken nose after being sandwiched in a marking contest which resulted in the Pritchard goal. Geelong captain Bews, who had just come off with a suspected broken hand, was forced to return to the field. It was the Cats' turn to struggle in front of goal, kicking five behinds before Neeld snapped his third at the 19-minute mark to narrow the margin to two points. Meanwhile, Hawthorn was also having injury problems, with Pritchard limping and Mew slightly groggy after a collision with teammate Ayres. With time-on approaching, the Hawks gained breathing space when Jarman snapped an amazing goal from a tight angle, but a near-instant reply from Mansfield brought the margin back to one point with seven minutes remaining. The suspense in time-on was almost unbearable, with Geelong trying to regain the lead and Hawthorn holding on grimly. The Cats had a final chance when Poole found space to run with the ball and kick it long towards goal, only for the Hawthorn defence to rush a behind. A minute later, the final siren sounded with the Hawks ahead by two points, sending them straight through to the grand final and gaining a much-needed week's rest.
Relieved Hawthorn coach Alan Joyce praised his side's effort:

"They had to be at their full in every department and to their credit they did enough to win. We have got a fortnight to prepare for the grand final and that's what we set out to achieve."

Geelong coach Malcolm Blight was disappointed with a number of players who had faltered under finals pressure:

"There's a few blokes today who should have a good look at the way they play footy and the way they approach their football. That's what finals are [about]; trying to find out what you're made of.""

Scorecard

Second Semi-final
14 September 1991	Hawthorn	def.	Geelong	Waverley Park (crowd: 63,733)	Report
3.11 (29); 6.13 (49); 10.13 (73); 13.17 (95)	Q1; Q2; Q3; Final	2.1 (13); 5.2 (32); 11.8 (74); 13.15 (93)	Umpires: Dore, Russo; Television broadcast: Seven Network
Dunstall 3 Dear, Hall, Pritchard 2 Hudson, Gowers, Robran, Jarman 1	Goals	3 G Hocking, Neeld; 2 Brownless, Bruns, Mansfield; 1 Stoneham
Platten, Condon, Gowers, Langford, Mew, Allan	Best	Stoneham, Poole, G Hocking, Couch, S Hocking, Bairstow
Hall (concussion), Mew (thigh)	Injuries	Brownless (hamstring), Bews (suspected broken hand), Hinkley (broken nose)
Reports	Brownless (striking)

== Week three (Preliminary final) ==
The Preliminary final saw West Coast return to Waverley to host Geelong on Saturday 21 September. This was the first final between the two sides.

Teams

West Coast	Geelong

West Coast
B:	45 Andrew Lockyer	14 Michael Brennan (vc)	36 David Hart
HB:	17 Guy McKenna	53 Ashley McIntosh	24 John Worsfold (c)
C:	10 Don Pyke	13 Scott Watters	30 Peter Matera
HF:	1 Brett Heady	4 Peter Sumich	28 Chris Lewis
F:	34 Dean Irving	9 Peter Wilson	39 Chris Waterman
Foll:	48 Glen Jakovich	7 Craig Turley	5 Dwayne Lamb
Int:	22 David Hynes	2 Dean Kemp	
Coach:	Mick Malthouse		

Geelong
B:	39 Jamie Lamb	20 Andrew Rogers	27 Andrew Bews (c)
HB:	1 Steve Hocking	26 Barry Stoneham (vc)	15 Marty Christensen
C:	24 Trevor Poole	7 Paul Couch	19 Neville Bruns
HF:	32 Garry Hocking	34 Trevor Spencer	22 Mark Neeld
F:	21 Michael Mansfield	28 Tim Darcy	8 Robert Scott
Foll:	30 Damian Bourke	3 Mark Bairstow	43 Russell Merriman
Int:	10 Stephen Hooper	45 Andrew Wills	
Coach:	Malcolm Blight		

After half-jokingly suggesting fifteen changes following Geelong's two-point loss the previous week, Blight ended up making only four changes to the side; two were forced, with Hinkley (three weeks) and Brownless (one week) suspended, while Denham and Simpson were dropped, replaced by Christensen, Hooper, Merriman and Scott. For West Coast, David Hynes was a late withdrawal and replaced with Adrian Barich. There were no late changes for the Cats.

=== Match summary ===
In complete contrast to the previous week, this game was played in cold, wet and windy conditions, and the poor visibility meant the stadium floodlights had to be turned on ten minutes into the first quarter. Kicking against the wind, Geelong managed to score first through Stoneham and hold West Coast goalless until nearly the 15-minute mark. With Jakovich starting to win more ruck contests, the Eagles suddenly turned the game on its head, kicking three goals in as many minutes to go into the first break with a 22-point lead. Geelong coach Malcolm Blight would later label that moment the turning point of the game. In the second quarter, West Coast worked hard playing against the wind to score two goals to Geelong's one to extend their lead to 27 points at the main break. Geelong were lucky to have that one goal counted to them, as replays showed Mansfield had clearly hit the post with his scoring attempt.
The Eagles further extended their lead to 34 points early in the third quarter when Sumich kicked his fourth. The game had now reached a critical point. Geelong, spurred on by experienced midfielders Bruns, Bairstow and Couch, fought back to cut the margin to 23 points at the last change. However, as they had done the previous week, the Cats let themselves down with poor finishing in front of goal in the final quarter. They drew the margin back to five points with goals to Neeld and Bairstow, but only after kicking seven behinds in the first 15 minutes. West Coast steadied when Sumich kicked his fifth and sixth goals, and when Hart kicked a running goal with little time left on the clock, Geelong's season was over.
The Eagles, and coach Mick Malthouse, had made it to their first Grand final, and while they had shown they could win tight games under pressure, the fact that they had played two games in the space of six days at Waverley Park in difficult conditions had pundits wondering how quickly they would recover for the following week.

Scorecard

Preliminary Final
21 September 1991	West Coast	def.	Geelong	Waverley Park (crowd: 47,638)
4.6 (30); 6.9 (45); 8.12 (60); 11.13 (79)	Q1; Q2; Q3; Final	1.2 (8); 2.6 (18); 5.7 (37); 8.16 (64)	Umpires: Dore, Sawers; Television broadcast: Seven Network
Sumich 6 Lewis 2 Hart, Heady, Jakovich 1	Goals	2 Neeld, Scott; 1 Bairstow, Mansfield, Poole, Stoneham
Heady, Jakovich, Sumich, McIntosh, Matera, Pyke	Best	Bairstow, Bruns, Stoneham, Scott, Couch
Injuries	Bourke (twisted ankle)

== Week four (Grand Final) ==
This marked the first time that West Coast had qualified for the grand final, as well as the first team from outside Victoria. Hawthorn were appearing in their eighth grand final in nine seasons. They had met previously in the Qualifying final. This would be the first, and only, VFL/AFL grand final to be staged at Waverley Park.

Grand final
28 September (2:50 pm)	West Coast	def. by	Hawthorn	Waverley Park (crowd: 75,230)	Report
5.1 (31); 7.2 (44); 12.5 (77); 13.8 (86)	Q1; Q2; Q3; Final	3.4 (22); 7.12 (54); 12.15 (87); 20.19 (139)	Umpires: Sheehan, Russo; Norm Smith Medal: Paul Dear; Television broadcast: Seven Network; National anthem: Daryl Braithwaite
Sumich 5 Heady 4 Lewis 2 Wilson, Pyke 1	Goals	6 Dunstall; 4 Brereton; 2 Dear, Pritchard, Hudson; 1 Condon, Hall, Anderson, Morrissey
McKenna, Pyke, Mainwaring, Heady, Sumich	Best	Dear, Lawrence, Morrissey, Condon, Platten, Brereton, Mew, Ayres, Dunstall
Wilson (corked thigh)	Injuries	Nil
Nil	Reports	Condon (striking), Lawrence (striking)

== Bibliography ==
- Atkinson, Graeme; Atkinson, Brant (2009). The Complete Book of AFL Finals (4th ed.). Scoresby, Victoria: The Five Mile Press. ISBN 9781742112756.
