= 1992 AFL Grand Final =

Grand final of the 1992 Australian Football League season

West Coast	Geelong
16.17 (113)	12.13 (85)
	1	2	3	4
WCE	2.6 (18)	6.8 (44)	11.15 (81)	16.17 (113)
GEE	5.5 (35)	8.8 (56)	9.10 (64)	12.13 (85)
- Date: 26 September 1992
- Stadium: Melbourne Cricket Ground
- Attendance: 95,007
- Umpires: Carey, Rich

Ceremonies
- Pre-match entertainment: Joan Carden

Accolades
- Norm Smith Medallist: Peter Matera (West Coast)
- Jock McHale Medallist: Mick Malthouse

Broadcast in Australia
- Network: Seven Network
- Commentators: Bruce McAvaney (host); Dennis Cometti (commentator); Sandy Roberts (commentator); Ross Glendinning (expert commentator); Bernie Quinlan (boundary rider); Tim Watson (boundary rider); Don Scott (analyst); Peter McKenna (analyst)

The 1992 AFL Grand Final was an Australian rules football game contested between the West Coast Eagles and the Geelong Football Club, held at the Melbourne Cricket Ground in Melbourne on 26 September 1992. It was the 96th annual grand final of the Australian Football League (formerly the Victorian Football League), staged to determine the premiers for the 1992 AFL season. The match, attended by 95,007 spectators, was won by West Coast by a margin of 28 points, marking that club's first premiership victory and the first by a team based outside the state of Victoria.

== Background ==
This was Geelong's first appearance in a grand final since narrowly losing the 1989 VFL Grand Final, while West Coast was making its second successive appearance in the premiership decider, having been defeated by Hawthorn in the 1991 AFL Grand Final

At the conclusion of the home and away season, Geelong had finished first on the AFL ladder with 16 wins and 6 losses (and an AFL record 3057 points scored for the season, which still stands today), winning the McClelland Trophy. West Coast had finished fourth (behind Footscray and Collingwood) with 15 wins, 6 losses and a draw.

In the finals series leading up to the game, West Coast defeated Hawthorn in the elimination final, before convincingly defeating Geelong by 38 points in the second semi-final to advance to the grand final. Geelong defeated Footscray in the qualifying final, and after their loss to the Eagles in the second semi-final, defeated Footscray once again in the preliminary final to advance to the grand final.

== Match summary ==
=== First quarter ===
In a repeat of three years prior, the Cats signalled their intent to attack both man and ball early when, two minutes into the quarter, Ablett bumped into Pyke with a raised forearm to the side of the face deep in Geelong's forward pocket, knocking Pyke out and needing to be stretchered off. Amazingly he was back on the ground less than ten minutes later.
After Matera had given a slight glimpse of what was to come with a long shot that was slightly wide in the opening seconds, the Cats kicked the first two goals of the game in the space of a minute through Poole and Stoneham. The Eagles struggled for accuracy early in the game, kicking four straight behinds before Riccardi added Geelong's third at the 13-minute mark with an impressive left-foot snap from a tight angle. Matera, who was being manned by Bairstow, finally scored West Coast's first goal at the 20-minute mark when he ran onto a hit-out from Barnes at the edge of the centre square, steadied and kicked truly from 55 metres. It was then Geelong's turn to squander several scoring chances, with Hocking (twice), Riccardi and Couch scoring behinds until veteran Bruns converted a set shot to put the Cats 17 points ahead, which remained the quarter-time margin as Sumich and Brownless respectively kicked their first goal for the game.

=== Second quarter ===
Geelong were first on the scoreboard two minutes into the second quarter when Ablett finished off a fine sequence of midfield play by slotting a wonderful set shot from outside the 50-metre arc on the right half-forward flank. From the resulting centre bounce, Ablett was again in the action, marking a quick pass from Couch and unleashing a big torpedo punt which was marked by Brownless nearly on the goal line, only to miss the set shot from a tight angle. The Eagles continued to create chances but with little reward, Waterman's three scoring attempts resulting in one behind and two out of bounds on the full. However, their persistence finally paid off when Matera gathered the ball from a ground level contest on the half-forward flank, used his explosive acceleration to escape from Bairstow, and snapped his second goal on the run from outside 50. Brownless replied quickly with his second goal of the game, but when Eagles rover Evans kicked two consecutive goals, Geelong's 24-point lead had been cut to ten points. Couch gave the Cats breathing space again when he goaled from point blank range after being awarded a 50-metre penalty, but with seconds remaining Sumich capped off a desperate passage of play with a freakish over-the-shoulder snap for his second goal to make the margin 12 points at half time.

=== Third quarter ===
In a repeat of the second quarter, Ablett kicked the first goal (his second for the game) to give Geelong a 17-point buffer four minutes into the term. But West Coast replied just two minutes later when Evans followed up another attacking foray and benefited from courageous play by Langdon to kick his third goal, and when Wilson, who had just come back onto the field, gathered the ball in the forward pocket, shook off a diving tackle around the ankle and snapped a freakish goal over his head, leading to commentator Dennis Cometti's iconic expression "like a cork in the ocean", the Eagles were now just four points behind the Cats and had seized the initiative. From the centre bounce following Wilson's goal, the Eagles again won the clearance, with Kemp and Heady combining to find Matera clear on the right half-forward flank. Matera marked and played on immediately, his glorious kick on the run from outside the 50-metre arc curling back between the big sticks for his third goal to give West Coast a lead they would never again relinquish. The Eagles extended the lead further when Sumich converted his set shot from a free kick for his third goal and Matera kicked his second for the quarter, picking up a loose ball as the Eagles again willed the ball forward through the middle of the ground, getting away from several Geelong defenders and finishing on his left foot. The siren sounded for the last change with West Coast 17 points ahead and holding all the momentum, having kicked the last five goals of the match.

=== Fourth quarter ===
Geelong fans were hoping for a repeat of their team's last quarter heroics from 1989, but it was West Coast who got the important first goal within the opening minute when Mainwaring and Lewis combined superbly to find Sumich on a lead. Instead of taking the set shot, Sumich cleverly handballed over the man on the mark to the oncoming and unmarked Matera, who ran into an open goal.
Brownless, who had been relatively quiet since the second quarter, finally broke the Eagles' run of goals with a superb set shot from the forward pocket after Kemp had been penalized for deliberate out of bounds. From the restart, the Cats again went into attack through Hocking. Ablett used his strength to bring the ball to ground and hand pass to Bairstow, whose running shot at goal from 40 metres out was touched on the line by McIntosh. West Coast steadied and replied with the next three goals via Sumich (two) and Wilson to extend the margin to 34 points at the 12-minute mark. Ablett scored a late consolation goal after a flop which earned a free kick, resulting in his third goal for the game.

=== Aftermath ===
The Norm Smith Medal was awarded to Eagles player Peter Matera for being judged the best player afield, with 18 disposals and 5 goals from the wing. One of these goals was a stunning right-foot 60-metre running goal from the right forward flank to put the Eagles in front.

== Teams ==
West Coast	Geelong

West Coast
B:	17 Guy McKenna	14 Michael Brennan	10 Don Pyke
HB:	24 John Worsfold (c)	27 Glen Jakovich	31 Mitchell White
C:	30 Peter Matera	2 Dean Kemp	39 Chris Waterman
HF:	3 Chris Mainwaring	19 Karl Langdon	28 Chris Lewis
F:	11 Ashley McIntosh	4 Peter Sumich	5 Dwayne Lamb
Foll:	23 Paul Harding	7 Craig Turley	18 Tony Evans
Int:	9 Peter Wilson	1 Brett Heady	
Coach:	Mick Malthouse		

Geelong
B:	37 Sean Simpson	28 Tim Darcy	20 Andrew Rogers
HB:	29 Ken Hinkley	17 Tim McGrath	24 Trevor Poole
C:	15 Peter Riccardi	7 Paul Couch	8 Robert Scott
HF:	5 Gary Ablett	26 Barry Stoneham	13 Russell Merriman
F:	2 Geoff Miles	16 Billy Brownless	21 Michael Mansfield
Foll:	6 John Barnes	3 Mark Bairstow (c)	32 Garry Hocking
Int:	4 Andrew Wills	19 Neville Bruns	
Coach:	Malcolm Blight		

== Match scorecard and Details ==
1992 AFL Grand Final
Saturday, 26 September 2:30pm	West Coast	def.	Geelong	MCG (crowd: 95,007)	Report
2.6 (18); 6.8 (44); 11.15 (81); 16.17 (113)	Q1; Q2; Q3; Final	5.5 (35); 8.8 (56); 9.10 (64); 12.13 (85)	Umpires: Carey, Rich; Norm Smith Medal: Peter Matera; Television broadcast: Seven Network
Sumich 6 Matera 5 Evans 3 Wilson 2	Goals	3 Brownless, Ablett; 1 Couch, Riccardi, Bruns, Poole, Stoneham, Hinkley
Matera, Kemp, Heady, Jakovich, Evans, McIntosh	Best	Hinkley, McGrath, Bairstow, Mansfield, G. Hocking, Couch, Brownless
Mainwaring (foot), Langdon (knee)	Injuries	nil
nil	Reports	nil

== Bibliography ==
- Atkinson, Graeme; Atkinson, Brant (2009). The Complete Book of AFL Finals (4th ed.). Scoresby, Victoria: The Five Mile Press. ISBN 9781742112756.

== See also ==
- 1992 AFL season
