= 1991 Brownlow Medal =

- Date: 23 September 1991
- Location: Southern Cross Ballroom
- Hosted by: Bruce McAvaney
- Winner: Jim Stynes (Melbourne); 25 votes

Television/radio coverage
- Network: Seven Network

The 1991 Brownlow Medal was the 64th year the award was presented to the player adjudged the fairest and best player during the Australian Football League (AFL) home and away season. Jim Stynes of the Melbourne Football Club was declared the outright winner of the medal count, becoming the fifth individual to win the award while playing for Melbourne.

== Top 10 votegetters ==
- If a number is vacant, it indicates that the player missed that particular game.
- Numbers highlighted in blue indicates the player led/were equal leader in the Brownlow Medal count at the end of that round.
- Players with asterisks next to names indicates ineligibility to win the award due to suspension from the Tribunal.

	Player	1	2	3	4	5	6	7	8	9	10	11	12	13	14	15	16	17	18	19	20	21	22	23	24	Total
1st	Jim Stynes (Melbourne)	0	3	0	0	1	0	2	3		0	2	0	0	0	0	1	3	3	3	2	0	0	2		25
2nd	Craig Turley (West Coast)	0	3		3	2	3	2	0	0	0	0	0	0	1	3	0	1		0	2	0	0	0	0	20
3rd	Garry Hocking (Geelong)		0	0	1	0	0	0	0	0	0	3	0	2		2	3	0	3	1	2	2	0	0	0	19
4th	Peter Matera (West Coast)	3	0		2	0	0	0	0	0	2	0	2	0	0	0	3	3		0	0	0	0	3	0	18
=5th	Matthew Knights (Richmond)	0	3	0	0	3		0	3	0	3	0	3	0	0	0	0	0	0	0	0		0	0	2	17
=5th	Michael McLean (Brisbane Bears)		0	0	0	2	3	3	0	2	0	3	0	0	0		3	0	0	0	0	0	0	0	1	17
=5th	Paul Hudson (Hawthorn)	0	0	3		0	3	0	0	0	3	0	0	0	2	3	0	2	0		0	1	0	0	0	17
=8th	David Cloke (Richmond)	3	0	0	2	0		1	0	0	0	0	0	0	0	0	0	0	0	1	0		3	3	3	16
=8th	Tony Lockett (St Kilda)							3	1	2	0	2	0	0	0	0	0	0	0	0		3	3		2	16
=8th	Damian Bourke (Geelong)		3	0	3	0	0	0	2	0	2	2	0	0		0	1			0	0			0	3	16

== Leading vote-getters by club ==
Club	Player(s)	Votes
Adelaide	Mark Mickan	14
Brisbane Bears	Michael McLean	17
Carlton	Peter Dean	11
Collingwood	Tony Francis	14
Essendon	Alan Ezard	9
Fitzroy	Paul Roos	11
Footscray	Peter Foster	13
Geelong	Garry Hocking	19
Hawthorn	Paul Hudson	17
Melbourne	Jim Stynes	25
North Melbourne	Wayne Schwass	13
Richmond	Matthew Knights	17
St Kilda	Tony Lockett	16
Sydney	Dennis Carroll	11
West Coast	Craig Turley	20
