= 1989 Brownlow Medal =

- Winner: Paul Couch (Geelong); 22 votes

Television/radio coverage
- Network: Seven Network

The 1989 Brownlow Medal was the 62nd year the award was presented to the player adjudged the fairest and best player during the Victorian Football League (VFL) home and away season. Paul Couch of the Geelong Football Club won the medal by polling 22 votes during the 1989 VFL season.

== Leading vote-getters ==
	Player	Votes
1st	Paul Couch (Geelong)	22
2nd	John Platten (Hawthorn)	20
=3rd	Jason Dunstall (Hawthorn)	16
=3rd	Tim Watson (Essendon)	16
=3rd	Nicky Winmar (St Kilda)	16
	Greg Williams (Sydney)*	16
=6th	Paul Hawke (Collingwood)	14
=6th	Roger Merrett (Brisbane Bears)	14
8th	Guy McKenna (West Coast)	13
=9th	Garry Hocking (Geelong)	12
=9th	Peter Daicos (Collingwood)	12

* The player was ineligible to win the medal due to suspension by the VFL Tribunal during the year.
