= St Joseph's College, Geelong =

St Joseph's College

Location
- 135 Aphrasia Street; Newtown, Geelong, Victoria 3220; Australia; 38°9′2″S 144°19′53″E

Information
- Type: Independent secondary school
- Motto: Latin: Ad Alta Virtute (Striving for the highest)
- Religious affiliation: Catholicism
- Denomination: Congregation of Christian Brothers
- Established: 1935; 91 years ago
- Founder: Christian Brothers
- Trust: Edmund Rice Education Australia
- Chairman: Wayne Tattersall
- Principal: Tony Paatsch
- Years offered: 7–12
- Gender: Boys
- Enrolment: 1,600
- Houses: Brophy; Butler; Foley; Jordan
- Colours: Black, gold, red
- Slogan: Compassion, Innovation, Integrity
- Song: Ad Alta Virtute
- Nickname: Joeys; SJC
- School fees: $6,087
- Affiliation: Associated Catholic Colleges
- Website: www.sjc.vic.edu.au

St Joseph's College (sometimes referred to colloquially as Joeys or SJC) is an independent Catholic secondary school for boys, located in the inner Geelong suburb of Newtown, Victoria, Australia. The school was founded by the Congregation of Christian Brothers in 1935, who continue to run the school, and provides education from years 7–12, offering a broad range of curricular choices for its students in middle and senior schools including VCE, VET and VCE-VM .

In 2014 the Year 9 Westcourt Campus began operation, and the Joseph Innovation Trade Training Centre also commenced classes offering a broad range of study options. The current principal is Tony Paatsch.

== History ==
Edmund Rice of Waterford in Ireland founded the congregation of Christian Brothers in 1802 for the Christian education of boys, particularly those from less affluent backgrounds. St Joseph's College Geelong was founded in 1935 by the Christian Brothers as a day school and, by 1940, had added a boarding school. Today it is a day school only, providing a comprehensive education for boys in the Geelong region. The college's Latin motto, "Ad Alta Virtute", translates as "Strive for the Highest" in English.

== Curriculum ==
St Joseph's College offers its senior students the Victorian Certificate of Education (VCE).

VCE results 2012-2025
Year	Rank	Median study score	Scores of 40+ (%)	Cohort size
2012	89	32	11.3	359
2013	99	32	10.9	412
2014	123	31	9.8	376
2015	91	32	11.6	374
2016	124	31	9.4	392
2017	119	31	10	387
2018	126	31	9.8	433
2019	118	31	11.4	491
2020	126	31	8.8	458
2021	133	31	8.3	440
2022	180	30	7.4	425
2023	203	30	5.2	489
2024	192	30	5.8	465
2025	178	30	6.9	438

== Campuses ==
=== Edmund Rice Campus ===
The Edmund Rice campus of St Joseph's College is located on Aphrasia Street, in the Geelong suburb of Newtown.

=== Westcourt Campus ===
The Westcourt campus of St Joseph's College is located on Minerva Road, in the Geelong suburb of Herne Hill. The campus caters for Year 9 students and has a chapel on the campus that opened in 2016.

== Sport ==
St Joseph's is a member of the Associated Catholic Colleges (ACC).

St Joseph's has won the following ACC premierships:

- Cricket – 2020
- Cross Country – 2017 2025
- Football (6) – 1994, 2006, 2007, 2010, 2015, 2016
- Golf – 2018
- Soccer (5) – 2005, 2006, 2009, 2013, 2025

== Notable alumni ==
=== Entertainment, media and the arts ===
- Mark Beretta – journalist; ten-time Australian champion in water skiing
- Mitch Cleary – sports reporter, Channel 7
- Peter Larkins – sports doctor and presenter on The Sunday Footy Show
- Xavier Rudd – folk singer

=== Politics, religion, welfare, public service and the law ===
- The Hon. Justice Bernard Bongiorno AO – Supreme Court Judge
- John Hyde – former Member for Perth, former Shadow Minister for Culture and the Arts; Multicultural Interests; Planning; Heritage

=== Sports ===
- Jimmy Bartel – Australian rules footballer for Geelong Cats
- Damian Bourke – former Australian rules footballer for Geelong Cats and Brisbane Bears
- Tim Bourke – former Australian rules footballer for Geelong Cats
- Allen Christensen – Australian rules footballer for Brisbane Lions and Geelong Cats
- Terry Callan – Australian rules footballer for Geelong
- Tim Darcy – Australian rules footballer for Geelong
- Luke Dahlhaus – Australian rules footballer for Geelong Cats
- Tom Doedee – Australian rules footballer for Adelaide
- Brayden Ham – Australian rules footballer for Essendon
- Jack Henry – Australian rules footballer for Geelong Cats
- Shaun Higgins – Australian rules footballer for North Melbourne
- Cameron Johnston – NFL player for Philadelphia Eagles and Houston Texans
- Cameron Ling – Australian rules footballer for Geelong Cats
- Matt Ling – Australian rules footballer playing for Sydney Swans
- Michael Mansfield – Australian rules footballer
- Patrick McCartin – Australian rules footballer for St Kilda Saints
- Tom McCartin – Australian rules footballer for Sydney Swans
- Nick Maxwell – Australian rules footballer for Collingwood Magpies
- Jackson Nelson – Australian rules footballer
- Oliver Peake - Cricketer
- Jasper Pittard – Australian rules footballer for Port Adelaide
- Matthew Scarlett – Australian rules footballer for Geelong Cats
- John Scarlett – Australian rules footballer
- Sam Simpson – Australian rules footballer for Geelong Cats
- George Sotiropoulos – MMA fighter in the lightweight division of the UFC
- Josh Spence – baseball player; MLB pitcher for the San Diego Padres
- Matthew Spiranovic – soccer player; represented the Socceroos and Qatar Stars League team Al-Arabi
- Tom Stewart – Australian rules footballer for Geelong Cats
- Barry Stoneham – former Australian rules footballer for Geelong Cats
- Oliver Henry – Australian rules footballer for Geelong
- Sam Walsh – Australian rules footballer for Carlton Blues
- Ned Reeves – Australian rules footballer for Hawthorn
- Tanner Bruhn – Australian rules footballer for Geelong
- Charlie Lazzaro – Australian rules footballer for North Melbourne
- Darcy Gardiner – Australian rules footballer for Brisbane Lions
- Michael Woolnough – Australian rules footballer
- Fraser Murphy – Australian rules player for Carlton
- Leo Turner – Australian rules player
- Bill McMaster – Australian rules footballer
- Kevin Higgins – Australian rules footballer
- Jim Fitzgerald – Australian rules footballer

== See also ==
- List of schools in Victoria, Australia
- Sacred Heart College, Geelong
- Catholic education in Australia
