= Frank Coghlan =

Frank Coghlan may refer to:

- Frank Coghlan, Jr. (1916–2009), American actor, later a U.S. Navy officer
- Frank Coghlan (footballer) (born 1962), former Australian rules footballer

== See also ==
- Frank Coughlan (1904–1979), Australian jazz musician and band leader
