= Tim Bourke (footballer) =

Australian rules footballer

Personal information
- Born: 14 April 1969 (age 57)
- Original team: St Joseph's
- Height: 199 cm (6 ft 6 in)
- Weight: 82 kg (181 lb)

Playing career^{1}
Years	Club	Games (Goals)
1989–1990	Geelong	5 (0)
- ^{1} Playing statistics correct to the end of 1990.

Tim Bourke (born 14 April 1969) is a former Australian rules footballer who played with Geelong in the Victorian/Australian Football League (VFL/AFL).

A ruckman from St Joseph's, Bourke played five senior games for Geelong. He debuted in the opening round of the 1989 VFL season, a two-point loss to North Melbourne Football Club at the Melbourne Cricket Ground. His other four games came early in 1990, rounds two to five.

His older brother, Damian Bourke, missed the opening round of the 1989 season and didn't play at all in 1990 due to a knee injury, so the pair never got to play together.

At the end of the 1991 season, Bourke was traded to North Melbourne, for a late draft pick. He was cut from North Melbourne's list in March 1992.
