= Brett Cook =

Australian rules footballer

Personal information
- Full name: Brett Cook
- Born: 19 April 1973 (age 53)
- Original team: Broken Hill
- Height: 194 cm (6 ft 4 in)
- Weight: 97 kg (214 lb)

Playing career^{1}
Years	Club	Games (Goals)
1994–1996	Fitzroy	25 (7)
1997–1999	St Kilda	18 (5)
Total		43 (12)
- ^{1} Playing statistics correct to the end of 1999.

Brett Cook (born 19 April 1973) is a former Australian rules footballer for the Fitzroy Football Club and St Kilda Football Club in the Australian Football League.

He was taken at pick 20 in the 1991 AFL draft by Fitzroy but had to wait until 1994 before he made his AFL debut. Following the end of Fitzroy's time in the AFL in 1996, he moved to St Kilda in 1997, where he became best known as the replacement ruckman in the 1997 AFL Finals Series in the absence of Peter Everitt and Lazar Vidovic.

Cook played in 6 of 22 matches in the 1997 season home and away rounds in which St Kilda qualified in first position for the 1997 AFL Finals Series, winning the club's 2nd Minor Premiership and 1st McClelland Trophy. He was delisted by the Saints at the end of the 1999 season.

== Post-AFL career ==
Following his AFL career he played for Kyneton in the Bendigo Football League in 2005, in 2010 he played in the Riddell league, and in 2011 joined the Coburg Tigers in the VFL as an assistant coach.
