= Jordon Bourke =

Australian rules footballer (born 1994)

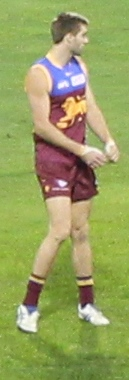
- Bourke at a game for the Lions against Adelaide in June 2015

Personal information
- Full name: Jordon Bourke
- Born: 11 November 1994 (age 31)
- Original team: Morningside
- Height: 193 cm (6 ft 4 in)
- Weight: 88 kg (194 lb)
- Position: Defender

Playing career^{1}
Years	Club	Games (Goals)
2013–2015	Brisbane Lions	6 (2)
- ^{1} Playing statistics correct to the end of 2015.

Jordon Bourke (born 11 November 1994) is a former professional Australian rules footballer who played for the Brisbane Lions in the Australian Football League (AFL). The son of former Geelong and Brisbane Bears ruckman Damian Bourke, Jordon is a tall strong-marking player who can play at either end of the ground.

== Early career ==
Bourke grew up in Coorparoo, Queensland, and was scouted by Brisbane Lions scouts for his natural talent. Chosen in the Queensland side for the 2011 National Under 18s championship, Bourke led the team to the Division Two title. His efforts were recognized with the Championships' Division Two Most Valuable Player award. He was selected in the AIS-AFL Academy program and was drafted by Brisbane in the 2013 Rookie Draft at number 63. He was the first Lions Academy member to graduate onto the Lions' official playing list.

== AFL career ==
Bourke played the majority of his debut season as a defender with Brisbane's reserves side in the North East Australian Football League (NEAFL), helping the Lions to their second NEAFL title in a row.

Bourke made his AFL debut in the last minor round match of 2014. In 2015 he played five senior games in a row before being dropped back to the NEAFL and was delisted at the end of the season.
