= Andy Lovell =

Australian rules footballer and coach

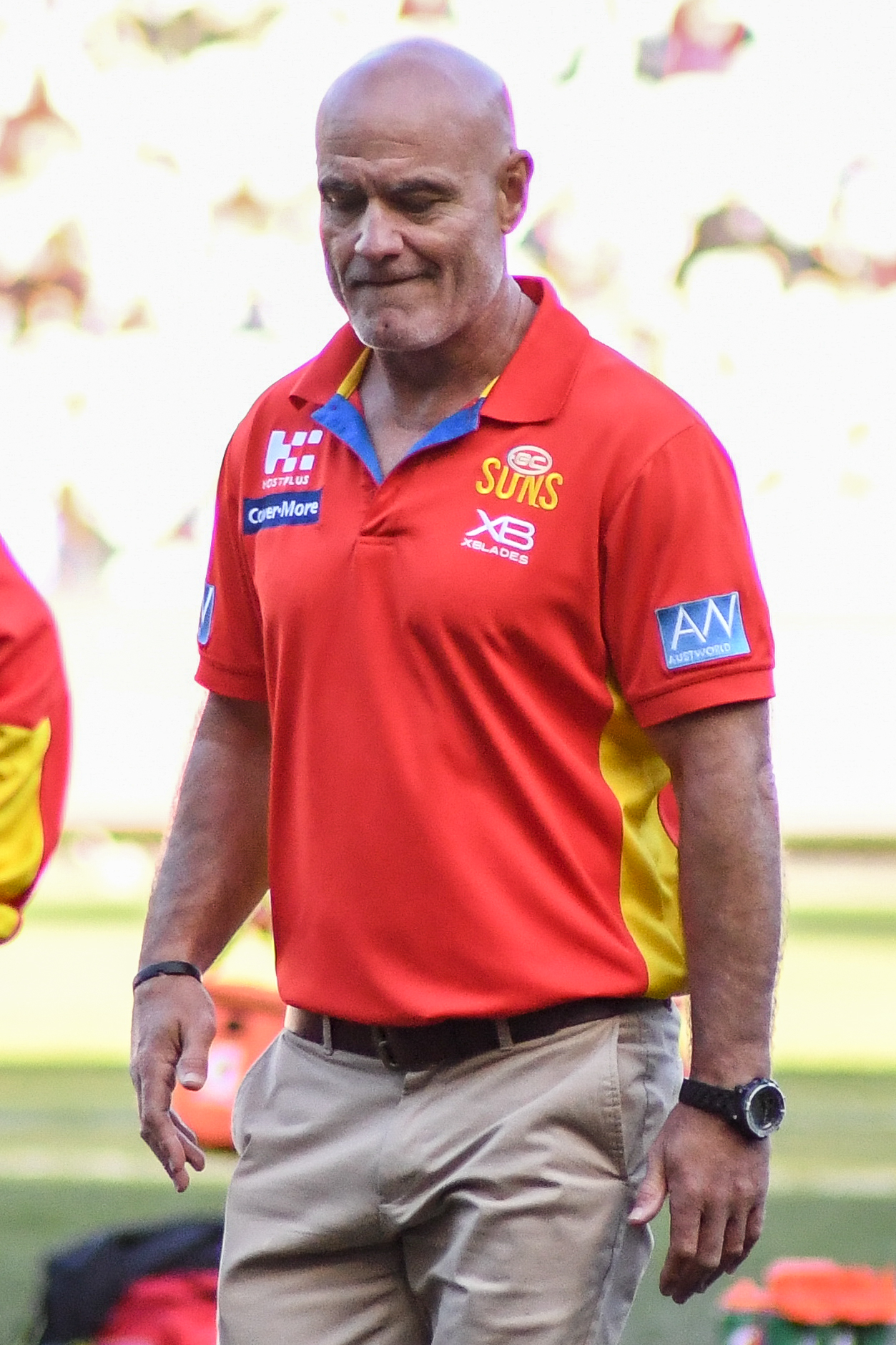
- Lovell with Gold Coast in August 2018

Personal information
- Born: 28 July 1970 (age 56)
- Original team: Glenorchy (TFL)
- Debut: Round 3, 1988, Melbourne vs. Geelong, at the MCG
- Height: 180 cm (5 ft 11 in)
- Weight: 82 kg (181 lb)

Playing career^{1}
Years	Club	Games (Goals)
1988–1995	Melbourne	121 (146)
1996–1998	West Coast	43 (20)
Total		164 (166)

Coaching career^{3}
Years	Club	Games (W–L–D)
2015	Indigenous All-Stars	(0–1–0)
- ^{1} Playing statistics correct to the end of 1998.^{3} Coaching statistics correct as of 2015.

Career highlights
- Harold Ball Memorial Trophy: 1988

Anthony Lovell (born 28 July 1970) is a former Australian rules footballer who played for Melbourne and West Coast in the Victorian and Australian Football Leagues (VFL/AFL). Lovell currently serves as an assistant coach with the Gold Coast Football Club.

As a teenager Lovell had been a wood chopper which earned him the nickname 'Chopper' and his father Greg was a world champion at the sport. Lovell attended Melbourne High School for one year (1988) and was a member of the School's 1st XVIII alongside Matthew Knights, Stephen Tingay, Stephen Ryan and John Ahern, footballers who also later played in the VFL and AFL.

Lovell was recruited to Melbourne from Tasmanian club Glenorchy and in his debut season played in their losing Grand Final to Hawthorn Football Club. A ruck-rover, Lovell was handy near goals and in a game at the Melbourne Cricket Ground (MCG) against Richmond in 1993 he kicked a career best eight goals as his side won by a record 121 points. The previous year he ran second in Melbourne's Best and fairest.

Lovell was traded to West Coast for the 1996 AFL season and spent three years in their midfield before retiring. He later became coach of the Sandringham Zebras and is currently an assistant coach at the Gold Coast Suns.
