= Andrew Lockyer =

Australian rules footballer

Personal information
- Full name: Andrew Lockyer
- Born: 7 July 1965 (age 61)
- Original team: Northampton / East Fremantle
- Height: 190 cm (6 ft 3 in)
- Weight: 95 kg (209 lb)
- Positions: Full-forward; Full-back

Playing career^{1}
Years	Club	Games (Goals)
1984–1987 1992-1996	East Fremantle	146 (390)
1987–1992	West Coast Eagles	78 (35)
Total		235 (425)
- ^{1} Playing statistics correct to the end of 1992.

Career highlights
- East Fremantle premiership side 1985, 1992, 1994

Andrew Alan Lockyer (born 7 July 1965) is a former Australian rules footballer who played for the West Coast Eagles in the VFL/AFL during the late 1980s and early 1990s. He also had a long career with East Fremantle in the West Australian Football League.

Lockyer was a member of West Coast's inaugural VFL season and made his debut in the same match as David Hart. He began his career as a forward, but shifted during his second season to defence and established himself as part of a champion backline in 1991. He played in West Coast's 1991 Grand Final side which lost to Hawthorn, but after that was quickly discarded by Eagle selectors when the team underachieved early in 1992.

Before and after his career with the Eagles, Lockyer played in the WAFL as a forward for East Fremantle, winnings premierships in 1985, 1992 and 1994, besides kicking fourteen goals in one match against Perth during the 1995 season.

After Lockeyer retired as a player he moved into coaching with West Perth for the 2000 and 2001 seasons. After having won the 1999 premiership, the Falcons failed to qualify for the finals in either of Lockyer's seasons as coach, and he moved into junior coaching with his old club East Fremantle; however as a result of the resignation of Rod Lester-Smith during a disastrous 2004 season that saw the blue and whites finish last for the first time since their inaugural season of 1898, Lockyer took over as caretaker coach for the last ten rounds. He later coached their underage team and won the 2007 JJ Leonard Medal.
