= Mark Bairstow =

Australian rules footballer

Personal information
- Full name: Mark William Bairstow
- Nickname: Toby
- Born: 24 July 1963 (age 63)
- Original team: Lake Grace
- Height: 180 cm (5 ft 11 in)
- Weight: 87 kg (192 lb)

Playing career^{1}
Years	Club	Games (Goals)
1985–1986	South Fremantle	40 (32)
1987–1994	Geelong	146 (172)
Total		186 (204)
- ^{1} Playing statistics correct to the end of 1994.

Career highlights
- 1986 Sandover Medal; 3× All-Australian team: (1987, 1991, 1992); 1986 South Fremantle Best & Fairest; Geelong captain: (1992–1994); West Australian Football Hall of Fame, inducted 2010

Mark William Bairstow (born 24 July 1963) is a former Australian rules footballer who played for the Geelong Football Club in the Australian Football League (AFL) and for the South Fremantle Football Club in the West Australian Football League (WAFL).

== WAFL career ==
Bairstow came to South Fremantle Football Club from Lake Grace in 1985 and had an immediate impact, winning the WA Media Guild's Footballer of the Future award, representing Western Australia in a state match against South Australia, coming second to Wally Matera in South Fremantle's best and fairest award and equal third in the Sandover Medal. He was then named as captain in 1986 and represented WA twice more, won the Sandover Medal and South Fremantle's best and fairest award.

== VFL/AFL career ==
Coach John Devine's recruitment drive in 1986 and 1987, saw players such as Dwayne Russell, Billy Brownless, Barry Stoneham, Robert Scott, Garry Hocking and Bairstow recruited by the Geelong Football Club. Bairstow signed with Geelong on 26 September 1986, five days before the 12 VFL clubs voted to allow a West Australian club (the West Coast Eagles) to join the competition.

Bairstow debuted for Geelong in 1987 and soon became Geelong's main ruck-rover. Geelong had one of the better midfields in the then Victorian Football League(VFL) in the late 1980s with Paul Couch, Andrew Bews and Bairstow. Bairstow was recognised as a prolific kick-getter. In 1989, he had 404 kicks during the 22-round home and away season to finish third on the disposals list with 591, behind Paul Couch on 615 and Terry Wallace on 614.

After Geelong's loss in the 1989 grand final, Bairstow retired from VFL football and returned home to Lake Grace, Western Australia to work on his family's farm. While there, Bairstow played football for Lake Grace, including another losing grand final.

Bairstow returned to Geelong in 1991 and helped them to the grand final in both 1992 and 1994.

After the 1994 grand final defeat and Malcolm Blight's resignation as coach of Geelong, Bairstow was delisted by Blight's former assistant, new coach Gary Ayres. Due to the nature of Bairstow's dismissal, he has seldom been back to the club.

Bairstow was selected in the All-Australian teams in 1987, 1991 and 1992.
