= Anthony Condon =

Australian rules footballer

Personal information
- Born: 6 December 1967 (age 58); Box Hill, Melbourne
- Original team: Koonung
- Height: 186 cm (6 ft 1 in)
- Weight: 88 kg (194 lb)
- Position: midfielder

Playing career^{1}
Years	Club	Games (Goals)
1987–1997	Hawthorn	145 (49)
- ^{1} Playing statistics correct to the end of 1997.

Career highlights
- 2 premierships, 1989 & 1991
- Source: The encyclopedia of AFL footballers

Anthony Condon (born 6 December 1967) is a former Australian rules footballer who played for Hawthorn in the Australian Football League. He played for the club from 1987 to 1997.

Condon played in the 1989 and 1991 Grand Finals for the Hawks, winning both of them. An on-baller, Condon lined up against Paul Couch in the 1989 Grand Final and prevented the Brownlow winner from getting a touch for the first 18 minutes of play. He also represented Victoria twice in State of Origin matches.

Condon was known for his extraordinary stamina, great hardness on ball and his composure in high pressure situations. One of the more bizarre anecdotes of his career was when a dog ran onto the ground and he unsuccessfully tried to remove it, failing he tried to kick the dog and tore his hamstring in the process.
