= Glen Jakovich =

Australian rules footballer (born 1973)

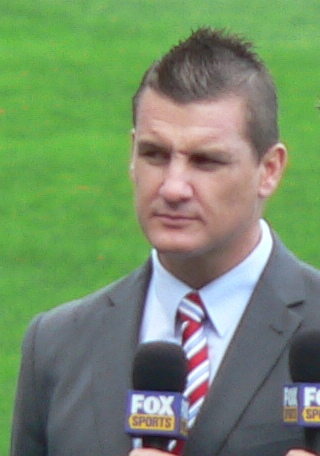
- Jakovich in July 2010

Personal information
- Full name: Glen Darren Jakovich
- Nickname: Jacko
- Born: 24 March 1973 (age 53)
- Original team: South Fremantle
- Height: 193 cm (6 ft 4 in)
- Weight: 100 kg (220 lb)
- Position: Centre half-back

Playing career^{1}
| Years | Club | Games (Goals) |
| 1989-1991 | South Fremantle | 51 (109) |
| 1991–2004 | West Coast | 276 (60) |
| Total | | 327 (169) |

Representative team honours
| Years | Team | Games (Goals) |
| 1990–1998 | Western Australia | 9 (3) |
- ^{1} Playing statistics correct to the end of 2004.

Career highlights
- 2× AFL premiership player: 1992, 1994; 2× All-Australian team 1994, 1995; 4× West Coast Club Champion 1993, 1994, 1995, 2000; 2x Ross Glendinning Medal: 1996, 2001; Australian Football Hall of Fame inductee 2008

Glen Darren Jakovich (born 24 March 1973) is a former Australian rules footballer who played for the West Coast Eagles in the Australian Football League (AFL).

Jakovich was recruited from South Fremantle in the West Australian Football League (WAFL), where he became a regular senior player at centre half-forward at sixteen and played his fiftieth match at eighteen. In 1990, he played a total of 46 matches for his school, Hamilton Senior High School, South Fremantle, and the Western Australian state side at three levels; under-19s in the Teal Cup, and the Western Australia State of Origin team.

He debuted for the Eagles in 1991 and played for the club in the centre half-back position and the number 27 guernsey. He was selected in that position in the All-Australian team of 1994 and 1995.

He was notable for his duels with rival centre half-forward, North Melbourne Football Club's Wayne Carey. Carey was considered to be one of the best of all time, and the contests between these two were highly anticipated events on the football calendar.

Jakovich also had a rivalry with Geelong Football Club All-Australian centre half-forward Barry Stoneham- Along with Carey this rivalry was highly anticipated when West Coast played Geelong.

After undergoing a knee reconstruction in 1996 he was unable to recapture his superlative form of the previous three years. Although still able to win his club's best and fairest award in 2000, he was not the imposing player of the past.

His brother Allen Jakovich was a full-forward for the Melbourne Football Club. During their career, the two brothers lined up against each other on more than one occasion. Another brother, Gary, had played with South Fremantle during the early 1980s. Glen was taller than his brother at 193 cm, but at 100 kg, both brothers were similarly solid in build.

Jackovich represented his state of Western Australia several times, in State of Origin. Jakovich has described that playing for his state, was one of his fondest memories in football. In 2003, Jakovich was selected as the Australia international rules football team's goalkeeper for the 2003 International Rules Series in Australia. Although the series was tied at one test win apiece, Australia won the series with a 101–94 aggregate score.

Glen Jakovich retired from football in 2004, kicking three goals in a win over Sydney Swans in his last game. Jakovich was the Eagles' games played record holder from 2003, when he overtook Guy McKenna's 267 games, until Dean Cox surpassed him in 2014.

Jakovich is an expert commentator on 882 6PR, in Western Australia.

In 2008 he was inducted into the Australian Football Hall of Fame and the West Australian Football Hall of Fame. He was an inaugural inductee in the West Coast Eagles Hall of Fame in 2011.

Jakovich is married to Emily and they have three children. He is a second generation Australian of Croatian heritage.

== Statistics ==
Legend
| G | Goals | K | Kicks | D | Disposals | T | Tackles |
| B | Behinds | H | Handballs | M | Marks | H/O | Hit-outs |

| Season | Team | No. | Games | Totals | | | | | | | | Averages (per game) | | | | | | | | Votes |
| Season | Team | No. | Games | G | B | K | H | D | M | T | H/O | G | B | K | H | D | M | T | H/O | Votes |
|---|---|---|---|---|---|---|---|---|---|---|---|---|---|---|---|---|---|---|---|---|
| 1991 | West Coast | 48 | 16 | 8 | 8 | 178 | 94 | 272 | 69 | 12 | 83 | 0.5 | 0.5 | 11.1 | 5.9 | 17.0 | 4.3 | 0.8 | 5.2 | 0 |
| 1992† | West Coast | 27 | 24 | 7 | 8 | 277 | 128 | 405 | 99 | 36 | 68 | 0.3 | 0.3 | 11.5 | 5.3 | 16.9 | 4.1 | 1.5 | 2.8 | 10 |
| 1993 | West Coast | 27 | 22 | 3 | 4 | 297 | 96 | 393 | 104 | 20 | 44 | 0.1 | 0.2 | 13.5 | 4.4 | 17.9 | 4.7 | 0.9 | 2.0 | 6 |
| 1994† | West Coast | 27 | 25 | 2 | 4 | 359 | 137 | 496 | 130 | 18 | 38 | 0.1 | 0.2 | 14.4 | 5.5 | 19.8 | 5.2 | 0.7 | 1.5 | 12 |
| 1995 | West Coast | 27 | 24 | 1 | 1 | 298 | 153 | 451 | 107 | 25 | 43 | 0.0 | 0.0 | 12.4 | 6.4 | 18.8 | 4.5 | 1.0 | 1.8 | 9 |
| 1996 | West Coast | 27 | 12 | 1 | 5 | 161 | 72 | 233 | 44 | 11 | 40 | 0.1 | 0.4 | 13.4 | 6.0 | 19.4 | 3.7 | 0.9 | 3.3 | 4 |
| 1997 | West Coast | 27 | 16 | 3 | 2 | 187 | 92 | 279 | 66 | 19 | 24 | 0.2 | 0.1 | 11.7 | 5.8 | 17.4 | 4.1 | 1.2 | 1.5 | 2 |
| 1998 | West Coast | 27 | 21 | 1 | 4 | 222 | 117 | 339 | 79 | 20 | 62 | 0.0 | 0.2 | 10.6 | 5.6 | 16.1 | 3.8 | 1.0 | 3.0 | 5 |
| 1999 | West Coast | 27 | 23 | 4 | 0 | 307 | 129 | 436 | 85 | 15 | 68 | 0.2 | 0.0 | 13.3 | 5.6 | 19.0 | 3.7 | 0.7 | 3.0 | 5 |
| 2000 | West Coast | 27 | 22 | 4 | 7 | 333 | 93 | 426 | 102 | 25 | 35 | 0.2 | 0.3 | 15.1 | 4.2 | 19.4 | 4.6 | 1.1 | 1.6 | 0 |
| 2001 | West Coast | 27 | 22 | 4 | 2 | 216 | 107 | 323 | 87 | 31 | 45 | 0.2 | 0.1 | 9.8 | 4.9 | 14.7 | 4.0 | 1.4 | 2.0 | 1 |
| 2002 | West Coast | 27 | 22 | 3 | 1 | 251 | 99 | 350 | 81 | 26 | 18 | 0.1 | 0.0 | 11.4 | 4.5 | 15.9 | 3.7 | 1.2 | 0.8 | 8 |
| 2003 | West Coast | 27 | 21 | 14 | 15 | 191 | 92 | 283 | 93 | 24 | 6 | 0.7 | 0.7 | 9.1 | 4.4 | 13.5 | 4.4 | 1.1 | 0.3 | 3 |
| 2004 | West Coast | 27 | 6 | 5 | 7 | 46 | 22 | 68 | 25 | 7 | 3 | 0.8 | 1.2 | 7.7 | 3.7 | 11.3 | 4.2 | 1.2 | 0.5 | 0 |
| Career | | | 276 | 60 | 68 | 3323 | 1431 | 4754 | 1171 | 289 | 577 | 0.2 | 0.2 | 12.0 | 5.2 | 17.2 | 4.2 | 1.0 | 2.1 | 65 |
