= Garry Hocking =

Australian rules footballer (born 1968)

Personal information
- Full name: Garry Andrew Hocking
- Nickname: Buddha
- Born: 8 October 1968 (age 58); Cobram, Victoria
- Original team: Cobram (MFL)
- Height: 182 cm (6 ft 0 in)
- Weight: 87 kg (13 st 10 lb)
- Position: Midfielder

Playing career^{1}
Years	Club	Games (Goals)
1987–2001	Geelong	274 (243)

Representative team honours
Years	Team	Games (Goals)
1992–1999	Victoria	8 (10)

Coaching career^{3}
Years	Club	Games (W–L–D)
2004–2005	Peel Thunder	40 (8–32–0)
2012	Port Adelaide	4 (0–3–1)
2014–2015	Port Adelaide (SANFL)	41 (26–15–0)
2017	South Adelaide	18 (8–10–0)
2020	Collingwood (VFL)	0 (0–0–0)
Total		83 (37–45–1)
- ^{1} Playing statistics correct to the end of 2001.^{3} Coaching statistics correct as of 2017.

Career highlights
- 4× Carji Greeves Medal: 1991, 1993, 1994, 1996; Geelong captain: 1995, 1999; 4× All-Australian team: 1991, 1993, 1994, 1996; Australian Football Hall of Fame: inducted 2008; Geelong Team of the Century; Geelong Hall of Fame

Garry Andrew Hocking (born 8 October 1968) is a former Australian rules footballer who played for the Geelong Football Club in the Australian Football League (AFL).

Hocking was an integral part of Geelong's midfield who was recognised at both club and League level as one of the finest players of the 1990s, winning club best and fairests, All-Australian honours and finishing top three in the Brownlow Medal vote count on four occasions. Recognisable on the field with his curly brown mullet hairstyle and nicknamed "Buddha", Hocking was inducted into the Australian Football Hall of Fame in 2008, and was also named in Geelong's Team of the Century and Hall of Fame.

Since retiring from playing, Hocking has coached at various clubs. He coached Port Adelaide in the 2012 AFL season for four games after Matthew Primus was sacked. He has also been head coach of Peel Thunder, the Port Adelaide SANFL side, South Adelaide, and the Collingwood VFL side.

== Early years ==
Hailing from the border town of Cobram in north-eastern Victoria, Hocking was one of three sons born to Les Hocking and his wife Pam. He also has one sister. Les worked as a hairdresser at 'Plugger' Bourke's barber shop, and young Garry served an apprenticeship with him before moving to Geelong.

== Playing career ==
=== Early involvement (1987–1988) ===
Hocking and elder brother Steve were part of then Geelong coach John Devine's mass recruiting drive which also netted players such as Gavin Exell, Bruce Lindner, Dwayne Russell, Mark Bairstow and Billy Brownless in the mid-1980s.

Hocking made his senior VFL debut in the 1987 round 3 match against Melbourne at Kardinia Park, wearing the number 51. He became one of a special group of footballers by scoring a goal on debut with his first kick, but otherwise had a quiet match with seven touches.

The following season, Hocking's guernsey number was changed to 32—which he would wear for the remainder of his career—but he only played three games in the second half of the season.

=== Regular football and losing grand finals (1989–1995) ===
It would not be until Malcolm Blight took over as coach in 1989 that Hocking would play regular football and establish his place in the team, helping Geelong by twice kicking a score of over 200 points.

Hocking represented Victoria on numerous occasions in the State of Origin series and played in four losing Grand Final sides (1989, 1992, 1994, 1995).

=== Captaincy and close finishes (1995–1998) ===
Hocking was considered unlucky not to win the Brownlow Medal, due to his many close finishes, finishing amongst the top three vote-getters on four occasions, although twice as an ineligible player. Hocking's consistency over a period was recognised by the club in 1995 when, after former captain Bairstow departed at the end of 1994, Hocking was given the captaincy role for the 1995 season. However, early in the season, he stated his intentions to give up the captaincy to concentrate purely on playing. The role would be shared between three players: Ken Hinkley, Barry Stoneham and Gary Ablett.

The Cats made it to the finals in 1997 but again were bundled out in straight sets.

=== Name change to 'Whiskas' (1999) ===
By the middle of the 1999 AFL season, Geelong was in crisis on and off the field. After winning the first five games, the Cats would then lose the next nine in a row to effectively end any chance of making the finals. The club was also in deep financial trouble, owing a debt of around $7.5 million with a forecast operating loss of $750,000 for the season. At the start of the year the Cats had made some organisational changes, with prominent local businessman and club vice-president Frank Costa appointed club president after predecessor Ron Hovey stepped down at the end of 1998. Brian Cook was recruited from West Coast as chief executive officer, and Hocking was named stand-in captain after newly appointed captain Leigh Colbert injured his knee in a pre-season match against the Brisbane Lions.

Midway through the nine-game losing streak, Cook approached Hocking with an unusual proposal. Uncle Ben's, the parent company of cat food label Whiskas at the time, would provide a financial incentive for the club if a Cats player was willing to change his name to "Whiskas" for one game. Hocking agreed to the offer and changed his name by deed poll to "Whiskas" for one week. He announced this on The Footy Show. The incident was met with mixed reaction in the football world. When asked about his publicity stunt, Hocking commented:

I see it as a great thing for the footy club and Whiskas. It is just a light-hearted thing and from a commercial point of view to help get the club out of strife.

The AFL refused to acknowledge Hocking's name change and continued to use his original name on team lists. The League's reasoning was that the name change, although temporary, threatened to bring the game into disrepute. Geelong ended up losing the upcoming match against Richmond, and Hocking was off the field injured by three-quarter time, but the financial incentive, which has to date not been publicly disclosed, went some way to helping the club's financial situation.

=== Accolades and retirement (2000–2001) ===
Hocking's tenacity, hardness, consistency and quality was rewarded in 2001 when he was named ruck-rover in Geelong's Team of the Century; it was considered a great honour given the fact there have been other quality ruck-rovers in Geelong's history.

Hocking retired at the end of the 2001 AFL season after playing 274 games, which at the time was the third-highest number of games for Geelong. He was inducted into the Australian Football Hall of Fame on 8 March 2008.

== Coaching career ==
=== Peel Thunder ===
After his playing career, which ended in 2001, Hocking moved into coaching. In 2004 and 2005, he coached Peel Thunder in the WAFL, a team which was struggling and managed to win just eight games during the two seasons Hocking was in charge. In one match, Hocking employed a tactic where every player on the Peel team was stationed in defence for a centre-bounce. Known as a "full-flood", this was viewed as a farcical situation, and one that Hocking wanted to use with his team down by a massive margin. Hocking since promised never to use the tactic again, and has said that in this one instance, it was appropriate for the circumstance.

=== Geelong Falcons ===
In 2006, Hocking was the coach for the Geelong Falcons under-18s side.

=== Port Adelaide ===
At the end of the 2009 AFL season, Hocking joined the coaching staff at Port Adelaide as an assistant coach. On 6 August 2012, he was appointed caretaker senior coach for the remainder of the 2012 season when Matthew Primus was sacked following the round 19 loss to AFL newcomer Greater Western Sydney. At the time of his appointment, Hocking felt unsure whether he wanted to continue as senior coach for the following season, and declared that while he had limited time to work with, he promised to foster an uncompromising attitude in the playing group:

"The expectation's not a win–loss one, it's just about gaining some respect back from our members and our supporters. It'll be a simple plan, you'll just need to play very aggressively and compete when it's your turn. There will be guidelines, benchmarks for those sorts of things that we're looking for in the game and that's all the players over the next four weeks will be judged on."

Hocking then decided against applying for the full-time role as senior coach of Port Adelaide at the end of the 2012 season, on 4 September 2012 and was replaced by Ken Hinkley as Port Adelaide Football Club senior coach.

On 4 October 2013, Hocking was announced as the SANFL senior coach of Port Adelaide, a position he held in 2014 and 2015 before returning to be an assistant coach at Port Adelaide's AFL squad. Hocking left Port Adelaide at the end of the 2016 season.

In 2020, Port veteran and football media personality Kane Cornes recalled Hocking's first address to the players as caretaker senior coach on the day of his appointment in 2012 and the brutal training session at Grange beach early the following morning:

It’s 4:00am in the morning at Grange Beach and I’ve never seen the ocean put on an uglier display. There was waves crashing over, it was as cold as you can imagine. 'Buddha' said, "Strip down, we’re about to pay the price", so we all got into our budgie smugglers or board shorts... usually when coaches have this sort of quick dip, you do a few duck dives and get out, but this was completely different. We stayed out in that freezing cold water for over an hour at 4:00am and it is honestly the coldest that I have ever been, to the point where you really question whether you wanted to keep doing this, that’s how depressing it was to turn up to a footy club when you lose.

=== South Adelaide ===
In 2017, Hocking was appointed senior coach of the South Adelaide Football Club in the SANFL for 2 years.

=== Collingwood ===
At the end of 2017, Hocking returned to the AFL by accepting a position as assistant coach at the Collingwood Football Club for the 2018 season. He was appointed senior coach of the club's VFL (reserves) side ahead of the 2020 season, which was ultimately cancelled due to the COVID-19 pandemic.

=== Leopold ===
In 2022, Hocking started coaching at Leopold Football Club in the Geelong Football League (GFL). He would lead the club to the grand final in his first season with the club, repeating that feat and going one better in 2023, winning the GFL grand final against South Barwon. The victory was Hocking's first senior premiership as a player or coach.

Hocking announced his retirement from coaching following Leopold's win in the 2024 GFL grand final after leading the club to back-to-back premierships.

== Personal life ==
Hocking and his wife Melina have three children: daughters Tayla and Chelsea, and son Lochlan, who joined the Geelong Falcons in 2019.

== Statistics ==
=== Playing statistics ===
Legend
G	Goals	K	Kicks	D	Disposals	T	Tackles
B	Behinds	H	Handballs	M	Marks

Season	Team	No.	Games	Totals							Averages (per game)							Votes
Season	Team	No.	Games	G	B	K	H	D	M	T	G	B	K	H	D	M	T	Votes
1987	Geelong	51	6	2	1	41	26	67	10	7	0.3	0.2	6.8	4.3	11.2	1.7	1.2	0
1988	Geelong	32	3	0	0	26	17	43	7	4	0.0	0.0	8.7	5.7	14.3	2.3	1.3	0
1989	Geelong	32	26	24	12	285	217	502	81	56	0.9	0.5	11.0	8.3	19.3	3.1	2.2	12
1990	Geelong	32	21	14	12	278	204	482	60	40	0.7	0.6	13.2	9.7	23.0	2.9	1.9	0
1991	Geelong	32	25	41	28	362	265	627	70	47	1.6	1.1	14.5	10.6	25.1	2.8	1.9	19
1992	Geelong	32	20	19	18	235	230	465	77	43	1.0	0.9	11.8	11.5	23.3	3.9	2.2	0
1993	Geelong	32	18	18	17	284	186	470	74	31	1.0	0.9	15.8	10.3	26.1	4.1	1.7	17
1994	Geelong	32	24	16	20	338	273	611	85	48	0.7	0.8	14.1	11.4	25.5	3.5	2.0	20
1995	Geelong	32	21	15	8	270	216	486	77	49	0.7	0.4	12.9	10.3	23.1	3.7	2.3	17
1996	Geelong	32	23	21	15	313	270	583	85	66	0.9	0.7	13.6	11.7	25.3	3.7	2.9	19
1997	Geelong	32	20	27	9	255	192	447	80	49	1.4	0.5	12.8	9.6	22.4	4.0	2.5	2
1998	Geelong	32	17	12	4	234	170	404	61	40	0.7	0.2	13.8	10.0	23.8	3.6	2.4	14
1999	Geelong	32	12	7	4	158	105	263	48	18	0.6	0.3	13.2	8.8	21.9	4.0	1.5	5
2000	Geelong	32	21	17	3	255	217	472	70	59	0.8	0.1	12.1	10.3	22.5	3.3	2.8	7
2001	Geelong	32	17	10	9	122	128	250	45	53	0.6	0.5	7.2	7.5	14.7	2.6	3.1	1
Career			274	243	160	3456	2716	6172	930	610	0.9	0.6	12.6	9.9	22.5	3.4	2.2	133

=== Coaching statistics ===
Legend
W	Wins	L	Losses	D	Draws	W%	Winning percentage	LP	Ladder position	LT	League teams

Season	Team	Games	W	L	D	W %	LP	LT
2012	Port Adelaide	4	0	3	1	12.5%	—N/a	—N/a
Career totals		4	0	3	1	12.5%		

== Honours ==
- Inducted into Australian Football Hall of Fame in 2008
- All-Australian Team (1991, 1993, 1994, 1996)
- Geelong Team of the Century (ruck-rover)
- Carji Greeves Medal (1991, 1993, 1994, 1996) (club record)
- Brownlow Medal top 3 (3rd 1991, 1994)
- Brownlow Medal most votes for Geelong (1991, 1993, 1994, 1995, 1996, 1998)

== Bibliography ==
- Kotton, Howard (2009). "Garry Hocking". In Murray, John (ed.). We are Geelong : the story of the Geelong Football Club since 1859. Docklands, Victoria: The Slattery Media Group. pp. 218–221. ISBN 9780980597301.
