= Karl Langdon =

Personal information
- Full name: Karl John Langdon
- Nickname: Boris
- Born: 28 March 1968 (age 58)
- Original team: Subiaco
- Height: 191 cm (6 ft 3 in)
- Weight: 90 kg (198 lb)

Playing career^{1}
Years	Club	Games (Goals)
1986-1987, 1995-1996	Subiaco	69 (95)
1988–1995	West Coast Eagles	100 (107)
Total		169 (202)
- ^{1} Playing statistics correct to the end of 1995.

Career highlights
- West Coast premiership side 1992; Subiaco Premiership player 1986

Karl John Langdon (born 28 March 1968) is a sports commentator and radio personality in Western Australia and a former Australian rules footballer with the Subiaco Football Club and the West Coast Eagles.

== Early life ==
Langdon began his sport career at Guildford Grammar School, an Anglican boys' school in Perth, Western Australia. During his school years he was an outstanding sportsman, captaining the school's football, cricket and athletics teams, the first student in its history to do so. In 1985 he won the Guildford Sportsman of the Year award. Langdon was a talented cricketer and was selected in the Under 16 Australian team. He also represented Western Australia at Under 16 and Under 19 level and attended the Western Australia Institute of Sport. Whilst working as a bank teller, his bank was the subject of an armed robbery by Brenden James Abbott (the postcard bandit).

== Australian rules football career ==
In 1985, Langdon began his football career, joining the West Australian Football League's Subiaco Football Club. He played in Subiaco's 1986 premiership side in only his third league game after starting the season in the colts. At the end of the 1987 season, after playing in a losing grand final against Claremont, in the WAFL, he was drafted by the West Coast Eagles in the Australian Football League and debuted in 1988. Nicknamed "Boris", he was a flamboyant half-forward who was naturally red-headed but bleached his hair during his playing days. Langdon played 100 games with the West Coast Eagles and played in their first ever premiership side in 1992. A knee injury the following year sidelined him for the entire 1993 season. He also made several appearances at the AFL Tribunal due to his aggressive style of play.

Langdon represented Western Australia in State of Origin games as a centre half-forward. He represented the state for the first time in the bicentennial carnival in Adelaide in 1988 and retired from the AFL after 100 games and 107 goals with the Eagles.

== Media career ==
In 1996 Langdon retired from football and became a football and cricket commentator for Perth radio station 6PR. During his time he has broadcast numerous sports including Commonwealth and 2000 & 2024 Olympic Games. He currently hosts 6pr's Breakfast Show 5-9am weekdays. He has a regular spot on Nine News Perth every Friday with Fishwatch and calls Speedway at the Perth Motorplex October to April annually. He has also been the master of ceremonies at West Coast Eagles home games since retiring in February 1996.
