= Andrew Gowers =

Andrew Gowers (born 1957) was appointed editor of the Financial Times in October 2001. He resigned from this post in November 2005 citing "strategic differences". In March 2012 he was appointed Director of External Relations at the Association for Financial Markets in Europe (AFME).

== Education ==
Gowers was educated at the Trinity School of John Whitgift, an independent school for boys in Shirley in the London Borough of Croydon, followed by Gonville and Caius College, Cambridge.

== Gowers Review of Intellectual Property ==
On Friday, 2 December 2005, he was commissioned by Gordon Brown to lead an independent review of intellectual property rights in the UK, known as the Gowers Review of Intellectual Property. Amongst other things, this review was set up to consider the implications of extending the copyright on sound recordings in the UK.

== Lehman Brothers ==
In June 2006 Gowers joined Lehman Brothers in London as head of corporate communications, and stayed until the September 2008 collapse of the firm — one of the key events of the 2008 financial crisis. In December 2008, The Times published his account of this period, in which he describes Lehman CEO Richard Fuld as "almost unbearably intense" and "insulated from the day-to-day realities of the firm".

== BP ==
In Autumn 2009, Gowers joined BP as head of media relations, replacing his predecessor Roddy Kennedy. He was responsible for handling the oil company's media response to the April 20, 2010 Deepwater Horizon oil disaster. He resigned from the position at the end of 2010.

== Personal life ==
Gowers is married and has two children.

Media offices
Preceded by Richard Lambert	Editor of The Financial Times; 2001–2005	Succeeded by Lionel Barber
