= Gavin Dore =

Australian rules football umpire

Personal information
- Full name: Gavin Dore
- Born: ~1961

Umpiring career
Years	League	Role	Games
1986–2004	AFL	Field umpire	302

Gavin Dore is a former Australian rules football umpire who umpired 302 AFL games, including the 1996 AFL Grand Final. His AFL career spanned 19 years—from 1986–2004—although it is 26 years if you include his semi-professional career.

== Umpiring career ==
Gavin Dore commenced his journey in Australian rules football umpiring in 1979 when he joined the West Gippsland Umpires’ Association at the age of 18. His progression led him to the VFL Reserve Grade in 1982, and he earned a promotion to the senior list in 1984. Dore's debut in the VFL came in 1986, marking the beginning of his career as an umpire.

Following his debut, Dore officiated in multiple home-and-away matches during the 1987 season, including his first finals appearance during the Qualifying Final. Unfortunately, an arm injury in the summer of 1987–1988 led to a significant interruption in his umpiring career. It wasn't until 1990 that Dore returned to officiate in the Australian Football League seniors.

Despite setbacks in 1992, Dore made a comeback in 1993, officiating in an Elimination Final and beginning a period of continued success. He went on to officiate in finals matches in 1994 and 1995. In 1996, during the AFL's Centenary Year, Dore received the prestigious appointment to officiate in the Centenary Grand Final more than a decade after his promotion to the VFL/AFL. This year was also notable for his decision to take a year off from work to focus on umpiring and further his education with a Dip Ed degree.

Since his Centenary Grand Final appearance, Dore's career saw a consistent run of form with no major injuries, officiating an average of twenty-two matches per year. He also had the opportunity to officiate in two State of Origin matches and represent his country in overseas exhibition matches on four occasions. Nearing the end of his career, Dore was involved in a bike accident during training, resulting in an injury that sidelined him for most of the season. Then, the week after umpiring his 300th game, Dore suffered a broken leg after an on-field collision with Michael Stevens.

== Personal life ==
Dore is married to Jenny and has four children, including his son Cameron Dore who has also been an AFL umpire since 2019.

In December 2006, Dore resigned as a teacher after allegations were made that he had inappropriately sent messages to a student. He was suspended as a teacher until the end of 2008.

== Recognition and Legacy ==
In 1993, Dore received AFLUA Life Membership for his contributions to the field of umpiring. Dore was the 11th field umpire to reach the milestone of 300 matches, which qualified him for Life Membership of the AFL for field umpires.
