= Brett Heady =

Australian rules footballer (born 1970)

Personal information
- Full name: Brett Michael Heady
- Born: 4 January 1970 (age 56)
- Original team: Subiaco (WAFL)
- Height: 183 cm (6 ft 0 in)
- Weight: 82 kg (181 lb)

Playing career^{1}
Years	Club	Games (Goals)
1988–1999	Subiaco	42 (62)
1990–1999	West Coast Eagles	156 (237)
Total		198 (299)
- ^{1} Playing statistics correct to the end of 1999.

Career highlights
- 2× AFL premiership player: 1992, 1994

Brett Michael Heady (born 4 January 1970) is a former Australian rules footballer who played with West Coast in the AFL from 1990 to 1999. He was named in West Coast's 'Team of the Decade' as a half forward.

Heady was a handy wing/half-forward player who was an opportunist when it came to scoring goals.

Heady played an important role in 1994, figuring heavily in the finals, kicking six against Melbourne in the preliminary final and then two in the Grand Final a week after, earning Heady his second AFL premiership medallion.

In 1999, Heady succumbed to his injuries and announced his retirement from the AFL, at the age of 29 after 156 games for the Eagles.

Brett played junior football at Whitford Junior Football Club.

== Statistics ==
Legend
G	Goals	K	Kicks	D	Disposals	T	Tackles
B	Behinds	H	Handballs	M	Marks

Season	Team	No.	Games	Totals							Averages (per game)							Votes
Season	Team	No.	Games	G	B	K	H	D	M	T	G	B	K	H	D	M	T	Votes
1990	West Coast	39	20	24	16	285	89	374	94	19	1.2	0.8	14.3	4.5	18.7	4.7	1.0	6
1991	West Coast	1	26	47	36	350	100	450	149	22	1.8	1.4	13.5	3.8	17.3	5.7	0.8	6
1992†	West Coast	1	11	20	17	122	42	164	50	10	1.8	1.5	11.1	3.8	14.9	4.5	0.9	1
1993	West Coast	1	19	24	19	204	78	282	86	13	1.3	1.0	10.7	4.1	14.8	4.5	0.7	1
1994†	West Coast	1	21	44	27	164	69	233	68	13	2.1	1.3	7.8	3.3	11.1	3.2	0.6	0
1995	West Coast	1	15	30	16	117	43	160	62	16	2.0	1.1	7.8	2.9	10.7	4.1	1.1	4
1996	West Coast	1	7	4	1	70	39	109	25	7	0.6	0.1	10.0	5.6	15.6	3.6	1.0	0
1997	West Coast	1	21	23	14	258	112	370	104	23	1.1	0.7	12.3	5.3	17.6	5.0	1.1	3
1998	West Coast	1	15	21	15	136	52	188	52	26	1.4	1.0	9.1	3.5	12.5	3.5	1.7	0
1999	West Coast	1	1	0	0	0	1	1	0	0	0.0	0.0	0.0	1.0	1.0	0.0	0.0	0
Career			156	237	161	1706	625	2331	690	149	1.5	1.0	10.9	4.0	14.9	4.4	1.0	21
