= Michael Brennan (footballer) =

Australian rules footballer

Personal information
- Full name: Michael Bernard Brennan
- Nickname: Monkey
- Born: 29 June 1965 (age 61); Perth, Western Australia
- Draft: Zone selection, 1987
- Height: 187 cm (6 ft 2 in)
- Weight: 92 kg (203 lb)
- Position: Fullback

Playing career^{1}
Years	Club	Games (Goals)
1983–95	East Fremantle	78 (5)
1987–95	West Coast	179 (20)
Total		257 (25)

Representative team honours
Years	Team	Games (Goals)
1985–89	Western Australia	3 (0)
- ^{1} Playing statistics correct to the end of 1995.

Career highlights
- West Coast premiership side 1992, 1994; West Coast Best Clubman 1995; West Coast Team of the Decade (1996); East Fremantle Team of the Century (1997); West Coast Team 20 (2006)

Michael Bernard Brennan (born 29 June 1965) is a former Australian rules footballer who played with the East Fremantle Football Club in the West Australian Football League (WAFL) and the West Coast Eagles in the Australian Football League (AFL). An inaugural West Coast squad member, Brennan played mainly at full-back. He played in West Coast's 1992 and 1994 premiership sides, and won the Best Clubman award in 1995, his final season. Brennan was named in both West Coast's Team of the Decade (named in 1996) and Team 20 (named in 2006), as well as East Fremantle's Team of the Century, named in 1997. His son, Jacob Brennan, was selected by a West Coast as a father-son selection in the 2010 National draft, and made his debut in round five of the 2012 season.

== Statistics ==
Legend
G	Goals	K	Kicks	D	Disposals	T	Tackles
B	Behinds	H	Handballs	M	Marks

Season	Team	No.	Games	Totals							Averages (per game)							Votes
Season	Team	No.	Games	G	B	K	H	D	M	T	G	B	K	H	D	M	T	Votes
1987	West Coast	14	21	3	5	192	49	241	52	19	0.1	0.2	9.1	2.3	11.5	2.5	0.9	2
1988	West Coast	14	18	1	4	136	52	188	44	18	0.1	0.2	7.6	2.9	10.4	2.4	1.0	0
1989	West Coast	14	16	2	4	148	52	200	48	12	0.1	0.3	9.3	3.3	12.5	3.0	0.8	1
1990	West Coast	14	25	3	1	167	94	261	57	23	0.1	0.0	6.7	3.8	10.4	2.3	0.9	0
1991	West Coast	14	24	3	0	175	61	236	55	21	0.1	0.0	7.3	2.5	9.8	2.3	0.9	0
1992†	West Coast	14	16	3	2	90	52	142	25	17	0.2	0.1	5.6	3.3	8.9	1.6	1.1	0
1993	West Coast	14	20	1	1	167	75	242	61	33	0.1	0.1	8.4	3.8	12.1	3.1	1.7	0
1994†	West Coast	14	23	2	1	144	62	206	67	22	0.1	0.0	6.3	2.7	9.0	2.9	1.0	0
1995	West Coast	14	16	2	1	101	48	149	41	12	0.1	0.1	6.3	3.0	9.3	2.6	0.8	0
Career			179	20	19	1320	545	1865	450	177	0.1	0.1	7.4	3.0	10.4	2.5	1.0	3
