= Tim Pekin =

Australian rules footballer, born 1965

Personal information
- Full name: Tim Pekin
- Born: 22 January 1965 (age 61)
- Original team: Colac/Coragulac
- Height: 185 cm (6 ft 1 in)
- Weight: 78 kg (172 lb)

Playing career^{1}
Years	Club	Games (Goals)
1984–1989	Fitzroy	107 (15)
1990–1995	St Kilda	112 (37)
Total		219 (52)
- ^{1} Playing statistics correct to the end of 1995.

Tim Pekin (born 22 January 1965) is a former Australian rules footballer in the VFL/AFL.

Recruited from Colac-Coragulac, Pekin debuted with the Fitzroy Football Club in 1984 and was a solid contributor in many positions on the ground. His consistency meant he played 107 games for the club (for 15 goals).

Pekin was delisted from the cash-strapped Lions at the end of 1989 due to his refusal of a lower salary, so went to the St Kilda Football Club where he was also a noted performer. He also went on to make a name for himself at the Saints, passing the 100-game mark at a second club to end up with 112 games at the Saints (37 goals).
