= Dean Irving =

Australian rules footballer

Personal information
- Full name: Dean Farley Irving
- Born: 1 September 1966 (age 60)
- Original team: South Fremantle
- Height: 200 cm (6 ft 7 in)
- Weight: 102 kg (225 lb)
- Position: Ruckman

Playing career^{1}
Years	Club	Games (Goals)
1985-1993	South Fremantle	70 (45)
1990-1993	West Coast	43 (9)
1994-1997	Melbourne	23 (4)
1998-1999	Subiaco	36 (14)
Total		172 (72)
- ^{1} Playing statistics correct to the end of 1997.

Career highlights
- Simpson Medal 1998 (interstate)

Dean Farley Irving (born 1 September 1966) is a former Australian rules footballer who played with the West Coast Eagles and Melbourne in the Australian Football League (AFL) during the 1990s.

Irving, who came to West Coast from South Fremantle, played as a ruckman. He was one of four debutantes for West Coast in the opening round of the 1990 season, with two of them; Dean Kemp and Peter Matera, going on to have highly successful careers.

His best season came in 1991 when he played 25 games, including the 1991 AFL Grand Final, and gathered 10 Brownlow votes. He could only manage a single appearance in each of 1992 and 1993 and crossed to Melbourne to continue his career. At Melbourne he again struggled to make the seniors and retired in 1997.

He returned to Western Australia and won a Simpson Medal in 1998 for his performance in an interstate match against South Australia.
