= Steve Hocking =

Australian rules footballer

Steven Hocking
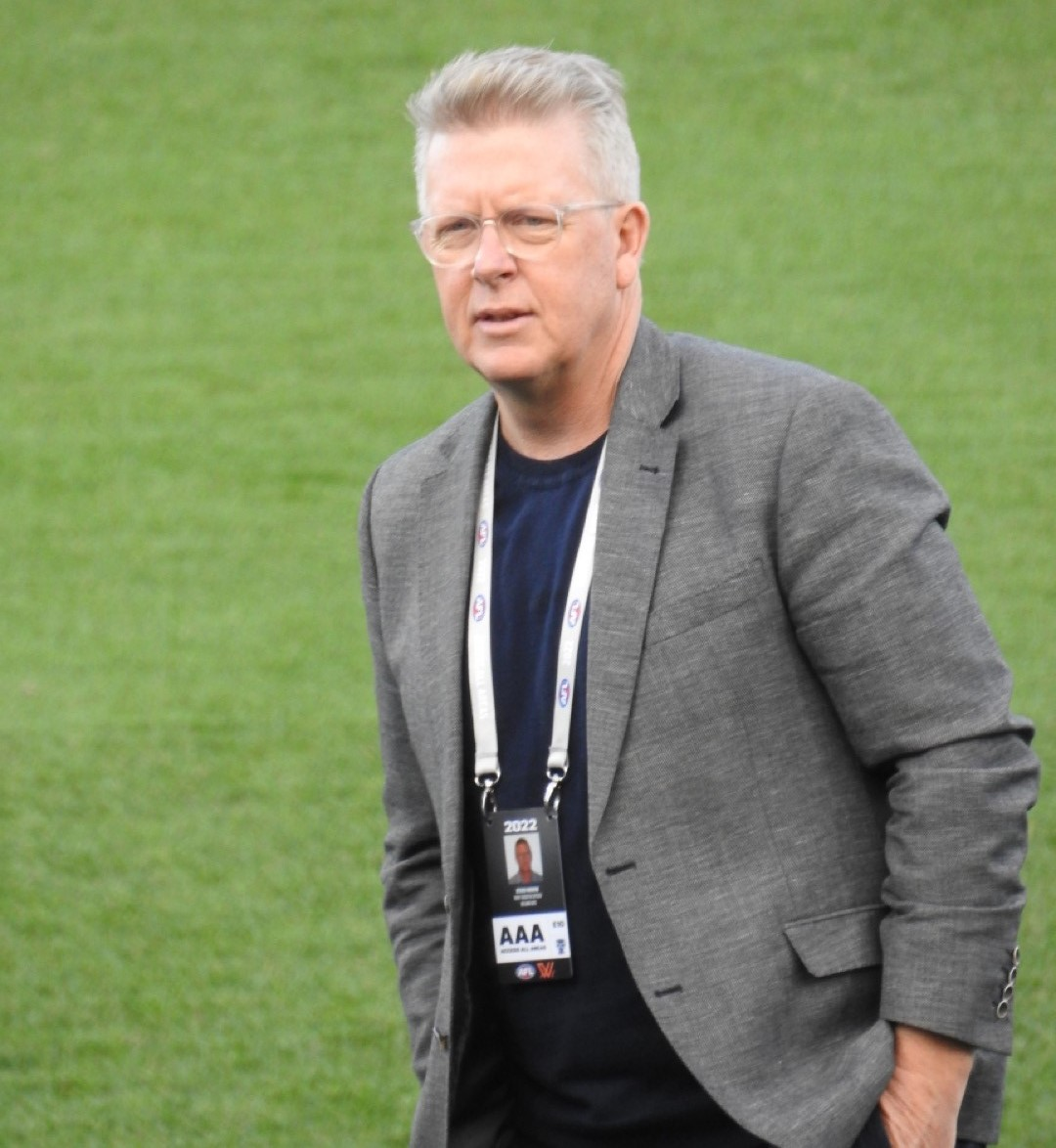

Personal information
- Born: 18 January 1965 (age 61)
- Original team: Cobram
- Height: 184 cm (6 ft 0 in)
- Weight: 84 kg (185 lb)

Playing career^{1}
Years	Club	Games (Goals)
1984–1994	Geelong	199 (10)
- ^{1} Playing statistics correct to the end of 1994.

Steven Hocking (born 18 January 1965) is a former Australian rules footballer who played with the Geelong Football Club in the Australian Football League (AFL). Hocking became CEO of Geelong after the 2021 season. He is the elder brother of former Geelong captain Garry.

== Playing career ==
=== Geelong Football Club ===
A back pocket specialist, Hocking played with the Cats for over a decade and fell one game short of reaching 200 games when he retired after ending up on the losing 1994 AFL Grand Final team. He was named as the club's 'Most Determined Player' award four times including three consecutive seasons from 1988 to 1990.

== Post-playing career & Administration career ==
=== Geelong Football Club administration and football department operations roles ===
Hocking returned to the Geelong Football Club as chairman of selectors in 2004 and quickly assumed the key role of Assistant General Manager of Football Operations. In 2014, Hocking was appointed as the club’s General Manager of Commercial, before returning to the football department as General Manager of Football in 2015.

=== Australian Football League's General Manager of Football Operations ===
In August 2017, Hocking was appointed AFL General Manager of Football Operations. Prior to this, Hocking had served as Geelong Football Club's General manager of football.

=== Chief Executive Officer (CEO) of Geelong Football Club ===
At the conclusion of the 2021 AFL season, Hocking became the CEO of Geelong Football Club, after long-time CEO of Geelong Football Club Brian Cook left the position after 23 years. In Hocking's first year in his tenure as CEO of Geelong, Hocking oversaw Geelong's AFL premiership victory in 2022.
