= Tony Hall (Australian footballer) =

Australian rules footballer (born 1964)

Personal information
- Full name: Anthony Hall
- Born: 16 September 1964 (age 62)
- Debut: Round 1, 2 April 1988, Hawthorn vs. Carlton, at Princes Park
- Height: 183 cm (6 ft 0 in)
- Weight: 88 kg (194 lb)

Playing career^{1}
Years	Club	Games (Goals)
1983–87, 1995	Glenelg (SANFL)	103 (151)
1988–1993	Hawthorn (VFL/AFL)	97 (144)
1994–1995	Adelaide (AFL)	17 (30)
Total		217 (278)

Representative team honours
Years	Team	Games (Goals)
	South Australia	20 (?)
- ^{1} Playing statistics correct to the end of 1995.

Career highlights
- AFL & SANFL: 2× VFL/AFL Premiership: 1988, 1991; 2× SANFL Premiership: 1985, 1986; All-Australian team: 1988; Jack Oatey Medal: 1986; Glenelg leading goalkicker: 1986; Representative: 2× National Football Carnival Championship: 1988, 1993

Anthony Hall (born 16 September 1964) is a former Australian rules footballer in the VFL/AFL and South Australian National Football League (SANFL).

== SANFL ==
A part of the great Glenelg teams of the mid-1980s with players such as Stephen Kernahan, Tony McGuinness and Chris McDermott, Hall was a key element in their 1986 premiership, playing at Centre Half-Forward. Kicking 6 goals in the 1986 Grand Final, he won the Jack Oatey Medal as best player, to top off a season where he was Glenelg's leading goalkicker (73 goals).

== VFL/AFL ==
Hall was recruited by Hawthorn, in the more lucrative VFL competition, for the 1988 season. He played in all 24 games that year, including a grand final win for Hawthorn. Hall was also an All-Australian in 1988. He played in another premiership with Hawthorn in 1991.

In 1994, Hall returned to Adelaide, joining the Adelaide Football Club for their fourth season in the AFL. In the twilight of his playing career, Hall managed only 17 games in the two seasons he played for Adelaide.

== Tony Hall Pocket ==
Playing for South Australia Hall kicked a near impossible goal in a State of Origin game against Victoria Australian rules football team from a forward pocket and as a result the pocket is still known to locals as the "Tony Hall Pocket".
