= Trevor Spencer (footballer) =

Australian rules footballer

Personal information
- Full name: Trevor Spencer
- Born: 28 June 1965 (age 61)
- Original team: Jindalee
- Height: 190 cm (6 ft 3 in)
- Weight: 89 kg (196 lb)

Playing career^{1}
Years	Club	Games (Goals)
1985–1989	Essendon	31 (28)
1990–1991	Melbourne	3 (0)
1991	Geelong	10 (1)
Total		44 (29)
- ^{1} Playing statistics correct to the end of 1991.

Trevor Spencer (born 28 June 1965) is a former Australian rules footballer who played for the Essendon Football Club, Melbourne Football Club and Geelong Football Club in the Australian Football League (AFL).

== Career ==
Spencer, a Queenslander, came from Jindalee and played his football as a ruckman and key forward. He made his first appearances in the VFL towards the end of the 1985 season and in 1986 kicked 17 goals from 12 games. In 1987 he injured his hamstring which restricted his appearances and he played just eight more games over the next two seasons.

He transferred to Melbourne in 1990 but could only manage three games before crossing to Geelong during the 1991 AFL season.

At Geelong, he was able to cement his spot in the team immediately and play their last 10 games of the season, including three finals.
