= Paul Couch =

Australian rules footballer (1964–2016)

Personal information
- Full name: Paul Edward Couch
- Born: 19 July 1964; Warrnambool, Victoria
- Died: 5 March 2016 (aged 51); Apollo Bay, Victoria
- Original teams: Terang, Warrnambool
- Debut: Round 5, 1985, Geelong vs. North Melbourne, at Kardinia Park
- Height: 180 cm (5 ft 11 in)
- Weight: 82 kg (181 lb)

Playing career^{1}
Years	Club	Games (Goals)
1985–1997	Geelong	259 (203)

Representative team honours
Years	Team	Games (Goals)
1989–1995	Victoria	5 (?)
- ^{1} Playing statistics correct to the end of 1997.

Career highlights
- Brownlow Medallist (1989); 3× Geelong Best & Fairest (1986, 1989, 1995); 2× All Australian Team (1991, 1995); Geelong Team of the Century; Geelong Life Membership (2006)

Paul Couch (19 July 1964 – 5 March 2016) was an Australian rules footballer who played for Geelong in the Australian Football League. Educated at local schools in Timboon, Victoria, he was married to Geraldine Maguire.

== Football career ==
Prior to playing with Geelong, Couch initially tried out with Fitzroy but was rejected for being too slow.

He was recruited from the Warrnambool Football Club and, though never blessed with pace and with a very "one-sided" left-foot kick, he had the ability to make position and place his team to advantage throughout twelve (often knee injury–ridden) years.

As a traditional "centreman", Couch was the pivot for the leading teams of 1989–1995.

While lacking outright pace, he had a strong work ethic, along with a good football brain and disposal skills, and was well-regarded as a centreman. Couch played 259 games and kicked 203 goals for Geelong from 1985 to 1997 and won the Brownlow Medal in 1989. Couch was known for his broad toothy smile. He formed a strong partnership in the midfield with good friend Mark Bairstow. Together, they both serviced tenured forwards Gary Ablett and Billy Brownless with pinpoint passes. Couch represented Victoria five times, was named All-Australian two times (1991, 1995) and won three club best and fairest awards (1986, 1989, 1995), as well as being named in Geelong's Team of the Century.

== Family ==
Couch's son Tom Couch played three games for the Melbourne Football Club before being delisted in 2013. He later played for Collingwood's VFL team. Couch's nephew, Nick Couch, plays for the North Ballarat Football Club in the Victorian Football League (VFL). His father, Bill Couch, played in the Hampden Football League for the Warrnambool Football Club, winning the club's best and fairest twice and playing in four premierships. Couch's two brothers, Bill and Peter, also played for Warrnambool.

== Death ==
Couch died on 5 March 2016. He was cycling with friends near Apollo Bay, Victoria, when he came off his bike. It was reported he had a heart attack.

== Playing statistics ==
**Brownlow Medal votes**
Season	Votes
1985	—
1986	8
1987	6
1988	10
**1989**	**22**
1990	3
1991	11
1992	6
1993	2
1994	9
1995	16
1996	6
1997	—
**Total**	**99**
Key:
Green / **Bold** = Won

Legend
G	Goals	K	Kicks	D	Disposals	T	Tackles
B	Behinds	H	Handballs	M	Marks

Led the league after season and finals

Season	Team	No.	Games	Totals							Averages (per game)						
Season	Team	No.	Games	G	B	K	H	D	M	T	G	B	K	H	D	M	T
1985	Geelong	7	17	15	23	202	107	309	60	—N/a	0.9	1.4	11.9	6.3	18.2	3.5	—N/a
1986	Geelong	7	18	12	10	247	143	390	80	—N/a	0.7	0.6	13.7	7.9	21.7	4.4	—N/a
1987	Geelong	7	19	14	14	292	118	410	78	32	0.7	0.7	15.4	6.2	21.6	4.1	1.7
1988	Geelong	7	17	15	13	262	174	436	67	27	0.9	0.8	15.4	10.2	25.6	3.9	1.6
1989	Geelong	7	26	23	19	415	285	**700**	82	56	0.9	0.7	16.0	11.0	26.9	3.2	2.2
1990	Geelong	7	20	13	16	286	222	508	63	35	0.7	0.8	14.3	11.1	25.4	3.2	1.8
1991	Geelong	7	24	21	17	374	262	636	73	44	0.9	0.7	15.6	10.9	26.5	3.0	1.8
1992	Geelong	7	23	26	14	293	201	494	82	43	1.1	0.6	12.7	8.7	21.5	3.6	1.9
1993	Geelong	7	20	14	10	260	179	439	38	32	0.7	0.5	13.0	9.0	22.0	1.9	1.6
1994	Geelong	7	24	29	23	327	229	556	64	53	1.2	1.0	13.6	9.5	23.2	2.7	2.2
1995	Geelong	7	25	13	12	401	221	622	57	48	0.5	0.5	16.0	8.8	24.9	2.3	1.9
1996	Geelong	7	21	5	10	330	134	464	72	35	0.2	0.5	15.7	6.4	22.1	3.4	1.7
1997	Geelong	7	5	3	0	49	29	78	8	6	0.6	0.0	9.8	5.8	15.6	1.6	1.2
Career			259	203	181	3738	2304	6042	824	411	0.8	0.7	14.4	8.9	23.3	3.2	1.8

== Honours and achievements ==
- Team
  - McClelland Trophy (Geelong): 1992
- Individual
  - Brownlow Medal: 1989
  - Carji Greeves Medal: 1986, 1989, 1995
  - All-Australian: 1991, 1995
  - Geelong F.C. Team of the Century – Interchange
