= Darren Cuthbertson =

Australian rules footballer

Personal information
- Full name: Darren Cuthbertson
- Born: 7 April 1970 (age 56)
- Original team: Epping
- Height: 185 cm (6 ft 1 in)
- Weight: 80 kg (176 lb)
- Position: Forward

Playing career^{1}
| Years | Club | Games (Goals) |
| 1991–1993 | Melbourne | 32 (43) |
- ^{1} Playing statistics correct to the end of 1993.

Darren Cuthbertson (born 7 April 1970) is a former Australian rules footballer who played with Melbourne in the Australian Football League (AFL) during the early 1990s.

Cuthbertson had started out in the Melbourne Under-19s after coming to the club from Epping and is best remembered for a run of 19 goals in three weeks which he kicked in his fourth, fifth and sixth AFL games. He kicked seven goals in Melbourne's win over North Melbourne at the MCG, bagged another seven the following week when they met Collingwood at Waverley Park and five more against the Brisbane Bears a round later. Cuthbertson's form then dropped away but he still finished the season with 29 goals and played in two finals.

He lasted just two more years on the Melbourne list and then returned to Epping where he had considerable success.
