= Lazar Vidovic =

Australian rules footballer, born 1965

Personal information
- Full name: Lazar Vidovic
- Born: 1 April 1965 (age 61)
- Original team: Castlemaine
- Draft: No. 43, 1989 pre-season draft
- Height: 200 cm (6 ft 7 in)
- Weight: 102 kg (225 lb)

Playing career^{1}
Years	Club	Games (Goals)
1989–1997	St Kilda	80 (13)
- ^{1} Playing statistics correct to the end of 1997.

Lazar Vidovic (born 1 April 1965) is a former Australian rules footballer who played for the St Kilda Football Club in the Australian Football League (AFL).

Although originally from Coolaroo, he was recruited from Castlemaine and debuted in 1989 with St Kilda. He missed the 1990 season with a knee injury but returned in 1991.

Vidovic played in St Kilda's 1996 AFL Ansett Australia Cup winning side.

Vidovic played in 7 of 22 matches in the 1997 season home and away rounds in which St Kilda qualified in first position for the 1997 finals series, winning the club's 2nd minor premiership and 1st McClelland Trophy.

In 1997, he played with the Saints as a backup ruckman when Peter Everitt suffered an injury, but he injured his knee again during the finals series, leaving Brett Cook as the number one ruckman for the 1997 AFL Grand Final. Following this he retired at the end of the season.

Vidovic was reported on many occasions during his league career, and known for his erratically aggressive on-field behaviour. In 2004 he pleaded guilty to five charges of forgery. He was fined $7,500 for these acts.
