= Russell Merriman =

Australian rules footballer

Personal information
- Full name: Russell Merriman
- Born: 6 April 1968 (age 58); Ballarat
- Original team: Redan
- Height: 175 cm (5 ft 9 in)
- Weight: 76 kg (168 lb)
- Position: Rover

Playing career^{1}
Years	Club	Games (Goals)
1991–1993	Geelong	25 (31)
- ^{1} Playing statistics correct to the end of 1993.

Russell Merriman (born 6 April 1968) is a former Australian rules footballer who played for Geelong in the Australian Football League (AFL) during the early 1990s.

Merriman, a rover, came to Geelong from St Kilda's reserves side but played his earliest football at Redan. He kicked 19 goals in his debut season and played in the 1992 AFL Grand Final, after helping Geelong win the Preliminary Final against Footscray with four goals.

He played for South Fremantle in the West Australian Football League before returning to Victoria to play and coach Leopold, Camperdown and Torquay Football Clubs.
