= Tim Darcy =

Australian rules footballer

Personal information
- Born: 15 January 1964 (age 62)
- Original team: St Joseph's (GDFL)
- Height: 186 cm (6 ft 1 in)
- Weight: 86 kg (190 lb)

Playing career^{1}
Years	Club	Games (Goals)
1982–1994	Geelong	176 (83)
1995	Essendon	14 (5)
Total		190 (88)
- ^{1} Playing statistics correct to the end of 1995.

Tim Darcy (born 15 January 1964) is a former Australian rules footballer who played for Geelong and Essendon in the VFL/AFL.

Darcy played most of his football in defence, often at fullback. He appeared in the Grand Finals of 1989 and 1992, ending up on the losing team on both occasions.

In 2020 he was named in the St Joseph's College Team of Champions, recognising the best VFL/AFL players to have attended the school.
