= Craig Turley =

Australian rules footballer (born 1965)

Personal information
- Full name: Craig Russell Turley
- Born: 24 August 1965 (age 61)
- Original team: West Perth (WAFL)
- Draft: No. 4, 1988 pre-draft selection
- Height: 185 cm (6 ft 1 in)
- Weight: 84 kg (185 lb)

Playing career^{1}
Years	Club	Games (Goals)
1985-2001	West Perth	92 (51)
1989–1995	West Coast Eagles	115 (91)
1996	Melbourne	16 (8)
Total		223 (150)
- ^{1} Playing statistics correct to the end of 1996.

Career highlights
- West Coast Club Champion: 1991; All-Australian team: 1991; West Coast premiership player: 1992; West Perth premiership side 1995; West Coast Team of the Decade: 1996

Craig Russell Turley (born 24 August 1965) is a retired Australian rules footballer who played with West Coast and the Melbourne Demons (formed 1858) in the Australian Football League (AFL) during the early 1990s.

Turley had his best season in 1991 where he finished second behind Jim Stynes in the Brownlow Medal count, and won his club's best and fairest. He was also included in the All-Australian team.

In 1996 he was named at the half forward line in the Eagles' official 'Team of the Decade'.
