= Stephen Tingay =

Australian rules footballer

Personal information
- Born: 13 August 1970 (age 56)
- Original team: Shepparton
- Draft: No. 50, 1987 national draft
- Debut: Round 1, 1989, Melbourne vs. Fitzroy
- Height: 181 cm (5 ft 11 in)
- Weight: 85 kg (187 lb)

Playing career^{1}
| Years | Club | Games (Goals) |
| 1989–2000 | Melbourne | 162 (84) |
| 2001 | Sydney | 0 (0) |
- ^{1} Playing statistics correct to the end of 2001.

Stephen Tingay (born 13 August 1970) is a former Australian rules footballer who played with Melbourne in the Australian Football League (AFL) during the 1990s.

Recruited from Shepparton, Tingay was an energetic and hard working midfielder known for his blonde locks. The 1994 season was Tingay's best, being named as an All-Australian and finishing second in the Demons' best and fairest.

Tingay played the first nine games of the 1999 season before severe hip and buttock injuries sidelined him for the rest of the year and all of the following 2000 season. Sydney selected Tingay in the pre-season draft for the 2001 season; however, Tingay's continued injuries forced him into retirement by the end of 2001 and he never played a senior game for Sydney.

== Statistics ==
Legend
| G | Goals | K | Kicks | D | Disposals | T | Tackles |
| B | Behinds | H | Handballs | M | Marks |

| Season | Team | No. | Games | Totals | | | | | | | Averages (per game) | | | | | | | Votes |
| Season | Team | No. | Games | G | B | K | H | D | M | T | G | B | K | H | D | M | T | Votes |
|---|---|---|---|---|---|---|---|---|---|---|---|---|---|---|---|---|---|---|
| 1989 | Melbourne | 52 | 12 | 5 | 2 | 82 | 29 | 111 | 16 | 19 | 0.4 | 0.2 | 6.8 | 2.4 | 9.3 | 1.3 | 1.6 | 0 |
| 1990 | Melbourne | 15 | 24 | 14 | 16 | 264 | 121 | 385 | 64 | 54 | 0.6 | 0.7 | 11.0 | 5.0 | 16.0 | 2.7 | 2.3 | 0 |
| 1991 | Melbourne | 15 | 15 | 5 | 3 | 160 | 48 | 208 | 32 | 18 | 0.3 | 0.2 | 10.7 | 3.2 | 13.9 | 2.1 | 1.2 | 0 |
| 1992 | Melbourne | 2 | 6 | 1 | 3 | 59 | 23 | 82 | 16 | 13 | 0.2 | 0.5 | 9.8 | 3.8 | 13.7 | 2.7 | 2.2 | 0 |
| 1993 | Melbourne | 2 | 20 | 13 | 13 | 261 | 162 | 423 | 81 | 42 | 0.7 | 0.7 | 13.1 | 8.1 | 21.2 | 4.1 | 2.1 | 10 |
| 1994 | Melbourne | 2 | 24 | 8 | 5 | 332 | 207 | 539 | 81 | 59 | 0.3 | 0.2 | 13.8 | 8.6 | 22.5 | 3.4 | 2.5 | 11 |
| 1995 | Melbourne | 2 | 18 | 11 | 6 | 212 | 108 | 320 | 63 | 37 | 0.6 | 0.3 | 11.8 | 6.0 | 17.8 | 3.5 | 2.1 | 0 |
| 1996 | Melbourne | 2 | 16 | 11 | 5 | 221 | 103 | 324 | 65 | 21 | 0.7 | 0.3 | 13.8 | 6.4 | 20.3 | 4.1 | 1.3 | 6 |
| 1997 | Melbourne | 2 | 3 | 0 | 1 | 37 | 17 | 54 | 7 | 3 | 0.0 | 0.3 | 12.3 | 5.7 | 18.0 | 2.3 | 1.0 | 0 |
| 1998 | Melbourne | 2 | 15 | 8 | 11 | 193 | 85 | 278 | 49 | 19 | 0.5 | 0.7 | 12.9 | 5.7 | 18.5 | 3.3 | 1.3 | 6 |
| 1999 | Melbourne | 2 | 9 | 8 | 4 | 109 | 45 | 154 | 26 | 14 | 0.9 | 0.4 | 12.1 | 5.0 | 17.1 | 2.9 | 1.6 | 2 |
| 2000 | Melbourne | 2 | - | - | - | - | - | - | - | - | - | - | - | - | - | - | - | 0 |
| 2001 | Sydney | 17 | - | - | - | - | - | - | - | - | - | - | - | - | - | - | - | 0 |
| Career | | | 162 | 84 | 69 | 1930 | 948 | 2878 | 500 | 299 | 0.5 | 0.4 | 11.9 | 5.9 | 17.8 | 3.1 | 1.8 | 35 |
