= Andrew Wills =

Australian rules footballer, born 1972

Personal information
- Full name: Andrew Wills
- Born: 3 January 1972 (age 54); Warragul, Victoria
- Original team: Barwon Football Club
- Draft: Uncontracted player selection, 1995 pre-season draft 9th Selection, 2000 Pre-season Draft
- Height: 184 cm (6 ft 0 in)
- Weight: 84 kg (185 lb)
- Position: Wingman/Forward

Playing career^{1}
Years	Club	Games (Goals)
1991 – 1994	Geelong	59 (43)
1995 – 1999	Fremantle	79 (78)
2000	Western Bulldogs	10 (6)
Total		148 (127)
- ^{1} Playing statistics correct to the end of 2008.

Andrew Wills (born 3 January 1972) is a former Australian rules footballer in the Australian Football League.

Wills was a character of the game, noticeable due to his clean shaven head, and played mostly on the wing or half forward. He played for the Geelong Football Club, the Fremantle Football Club and the Western Bulldogs. Wills was selected to play in the 1992 and 1994 AFL Grand Finals for Geelong Football Club.
