= David Hart (footballer) =

Australian rules footballer

Personal information
- Full name: David William Hart
- Born: 3 March 1964 (age 62)
- Original team: South Fremantle (WAFL)
- Height: 176 cm (5 ft 9 in)
- Weight: 83 kg (183 lb)

Playing career^{1}
Years	Club	Games (Goals)
1983	West Perth	7 (11)
1984-1997	South Fremantle	79 (84)
1987–1997	West Coast Eagles	184 (95)
Total		270 (190)
- ^{1} Playing statistics correct to the end of 1997.

Career highlights
- All-Australian: 1994; AFL premiership player: 1994

David William Hart (born 3 March 1964) is a former Australian rules footballer who played with West Coast in the AFL. Although he was born in Victoria he was brought up in the West Australian town of Bruce Rock. He played seven games for West Perth, followed by 55 games with South Fremantle before being recruited by West Coast.

A rover come defender, Hart played in West Coast's inaugural VFL side in 1987. His best season came in 1994 when he earned All Australian selection and won a premiership.

In 1996 he was named in the backline in West Coast's Team of the Decade.

== Statistics ==
Legend
G	Goals	K	Kicks	D	Disposals	T	Tackles
B	Behinds	H	Handballs	M	Marks

Season	Team	No.	Games	Totals							Averages (per game)							Votes
Season	Team	No.	Games	G	B	K	H	D	M	T	G	B	K	H	D	M	T	Votes
1987	West Coast	36	17	23	12	203	63	266	59	14	1.4	0.7	11.9	3.7	15.6	3.5	0.8	0
1988	West Coast	36	20	17	20	255	62	317	55	17	0.9	1.0	12.8	3.1	15.9	2.8	0.9	0
1989	West Coast	36	19	9	22	252	86	338	61	18	0.5	1.2	13.3	4.5	17.8	3.2	0.9	0
1990	West Coast	36	18	14	7	213	98	311	44	25	0.8	0.4	11.8	5.4	17.3	2.4	1.4	1
1991	West Coast	36	21	12	7	243	108	351	39	20	0.6	0.3	11.6	5.1	16.7	1.9	1.0	3
1992	West Coast	36	9	2	2	99	28	127	16	9	0.2	0.2	11.0	3.1	14.1	1.8	1.0	0
1993	West Coast	36	8	1	1	99	36	135	21	8	0.1	0.1	12.4	4.5	16.9	2.6	1.0	2
1994†	West Coast	36	25	9	8	298	118	416	71	24	0.4	0.3	11.9	4.7	16.6	2.8	1.0	7
1995	West Coast	36	19	1	4	207	79	286	54	26	0.1	0.2	10.9	4.2	15.1	2.8	1.4	5
1996	West Coast	36	21	6	2	220	87	307	57	29	0.3	0.1	10.5	4.1	14.6	2.7	1.4	0
1997	West Coast	36	7	1	0	30	24	54	13	10	0.1	0.0	4.3	3.4	7.7	1.9	1.4	0
Career			184	95	85	2119	789	2908	490	200	0.5	0.5	11.5	4.3	15.8	2.7	1.1	18
