= Michael Mansfield (footballer) =

Australian rules footballer

Personal information
- Full name: Michael Mansfield
- Born: 8 August 1971 (age 55)
- Original team: St Joseph's
- Height: 183 cm (6 ft 0 in)
- Weight: 85 kg (187 lb)
- Position: Half back flank

Playing career^{1}
Years	Club	Games (Goals)
1990–1999	Geelong	181 (100)
2000–2002	Carlton	54 (18)
Total		235 (118)
- ^{1} Playing statistics correct to the end of 2002.

Career highlights
- All-Australian: 1994, 1995

Michael Mansfield (born 8 August 1971) is a former Australian rules footballer who played for the Geelong Football Club and the Carlton Football Club in the Australian Football League (AFL).

A left footed half back flanker, Mansfield was recruited from St Joseph's and debuted for Geelong in 1990. He played 181 games for the Cats before moving to Carlton in 1999 where he brought up his 200th game of AFL. During his time with Geelong, Mansfield was twice named an All-Australian, in 1994 and 1995. Mansfield is now a stockbroker in Melbourne.

In 2020 he was named in the St Joseph’s College team of champions, recognising the best VFL/AFL players to have attended the school.

== Statistics ==
Legend
G	Goals	K	Kicks	D	Disposals	T	Tackles
B	Behinds	H	Handballs	M	Marks

Season	Team	No.	Games	Totals							Averages (per game)							Votes
Season	Team	No.	Games	G	B	K	H	D	M	T	G	B	K	H	D	M	T	Votes
1990	Geelong	49	5	2	2	69	33	102	19	4	0.4	0.4	13.8	6.6	20.4	3.8	0.8	3
1991	Geelong	21	16	24	15	158	94	252	62	11	1.5	0.9	9.9	5.9	15.8	3.9	0.7	0
1992	Geelong	21	19	9	5	197	102	299	77	22	0.5	0.3	10.4	5.4	15.7	4.1	1.2	3
1993	Geelong	21	9	4	6	69	32	101	22	12	0.4	0.7	7.7	3.6	11.2	2.4	1.3	0
1994	Geelong	21	25	3	3	244	151	395	129	40	0.1	0.1	9.8	6.0	15.8	5.2	1.6	11
1995	Geelong	21	23	5	3	221	138	359	103	29	0.2	0.1	9.6	6.0	15.6	4.5	1.3	3
1996	Geelong	21	21	20	13	195	137	332	106	25	1.0	0.6	9.3	6.5	15.8	5.0	1.2	2
1997	Geelong	21	23	14	9	189	139	328	116	22	0.6	0.4	8.2	6.0	14.3	5.0	1.0	5
1998	Geelong	21	22	5	13	208	119	327	119	24	0.2	0.6	9.5	5.4	14.9	5.4	1.1	1
1999	Geelong	21	18	14	8	142	74	216	77	15	0.8	0.4	7.9	4.1	12.0	4.3	0.8	0
2000	Carlton	10	18	6	2	116	72	188	46	31	0.3	0.1	6.4	4.0	10.4	2.6	1.7	0
2001	Carlton	10	20	7	10	155	89	244	71	29	0.4	0.5	7.8	4.5	12.2	3.5	1.5	0
2002	Carlton	10	16	5	4	79	49	128	45	19	0.3	0.3	4.9	3.1	8.0	2.8	1.2	0
Career			235	118	93	2042	1229	3271	992	283	0.5	0.4	8.7	5.2	13.9	4.2	1.2	28
