= Frank Coghlan (footballer) =

Australian rules footballer

Personal information
- Full name: Frank Coghlan
- Born: 31 October 1962 (age 64)
- Original team: Sandhurst
- Height: 183 cm (6 ft 0 in)
- Weight: 84 kg (185 lb)

Playing career^{1}
Years	Club	Games (Goals)
1986–1992	St Kilda	109 (64)
- ^{1} Playing statistics correct to the end of 1992.

Frank Coghlan (born 31 October 1962) is a former Australian rules footballer who played with St Kilda in the Victorian/Australian Football League (VFL/AFL).

A centreman from Sandhurst, Coghlan was turned away by Carlton before joining St Kilda. He was 23 years old by the time he made his league debut in 1986 and had a strong first game with 25 disposals. The following season he missed just one round and in 1988 was St Kilda's top disposal getter with 447, at an average of 21.29 a game.

Coghlan had his best season in 1991 when he made 23 appearances, including an elimination final, had 398 disposals and kicked 33 goals. He polled well on Brownlow Medal night with nine votes, three of them coming for a 29 disposal and four goal effort against Sydney at Moorabbin.

When his league career ended, Coghlan returned to Sandhurst in the Bendigo Football League and won the 1995 Michelsen Medal.
