= Neville Bruns =

Australian rules footballer (born 1958)

Personal information
- Born: 3 October 1958 (age 68)
- Original team: Leitchville
- Debut: Round 7: 13 May 1978, Geelong vs. Melbourne, at VFL Park
- Height: 176 cm (5 ft 9 in)
- Weight: 77 kg (170 lb)

Playing career^{1}
Years	Club	Games (Goals)
1978–1992	Geelong	223 (174)
- ^{1} Playing statistics correct to the end of 1992.

Neville Bruns (born 3 October 1958) is a former Australian rules footballer in the Victorian/Australian Football League for Geelong Football Club. He wore the number 19 during his tenure at the club and played often in the wing and rover positions. From 1978 to 1992 he played 223 games (including the 1989 and 1992 Grand Finals) and kicked 174 goals. He received a total of 33 Brownlow votes in his career.

In 1985, Leigh Matthews king hit Bruns and broke his jaw. Although no reports were made at the time, the Victorian Football League (VFL) Commissioners subsequently investigated the incident, found Matthews to be responsible and deregistered him for four weeks. Matthews then faced a criminal charge of assault, to which he pleaded guilty, and was fined $1,000. This resulted in much debate over the role of the police in sporting incidents.

Bruns formerly worked as the Victorian State Manager for Sportsco and was also the National Operations Manager for an Australian trade and industrial tool retailer, Total Tools. He also worked as a teacher at Geelong College in the 1980s. He is now retired and lives with his wife Karen in the Geelong area.
