= Trevor Poole =

Australian rules footballer

Personal information
- Born: 23 April 1964 (age 62)
- Original team: Tempy-Gorya-Patchewollock
- Height: 187 cm (6 ft 2 in)
- Weight: 82 kg (181 lb)

Playing career^{1}
Years	Club	Games (Goals)
1984–1989	Richmond	99 (56)
1990–1993	Geelong	54 (34)
Total		153 (90)
- ^{1} Playing statistics correct to the end of 1993.

Career highlights
- Richmond Best and Fairest 1985; Interstate games:- 2

Trevor Poole (born 23 April 1964) is a former Australian rules football player who played in the VFL/AFL between 1983 and 1989 for the Richmond Football Club and then from 1990 until 1993 for the Geelong Football Club.
