= Damian Bourke =

Australian rules footballer

Personal information
- Full name: Damian Bourke
- Born: 19 January 1965 (age 61)
- Original team: St Joseph's
- Height: 199 cm (6 ft 6 in)
- Weight: 98 kg (216 lb)
- Position: Ruckman

Playing career^{1}
| Years | Club | Games (Goals) |
| 1983 – 1992 | Geelong | 102 (15) |
| 1993 – 1995 | Brisbane Bears | 22 (4) |
| Total | | 124 (19) |
- ^{1} Playing statistics correct to the end of 1995.

Damian Bourke (born 19 January 1965) is a former Australian rules footballer for Australian Football League (AFL) clubs Geelong during the 1980s and Brisbane in the early 1990s.

Bourke played as a ruckman and captained Geelong from 1987 until 1989. His last game as captain was the 1989 VFL Grand Final where Geelong lost to Hawthorn by a goal. Bourke finished equal eighth in the 1991 Brownlow Medal and in 1993 moved to Queensland to play for Brisbane. Bourke retired at the end of the 1995 AFL season.

Bourke's son Jordon Bourke was a Brisbane Lions listed player between 2013 and 2015.
