= Barry Stoneham =

Australian rules footballer

Personal information
- Full name: Barry Stoneham
- Born: 9 February 1968 (age 58); Geelong, Victoria
- Original team: St Joseph's (GFL)
- Height: 194 cm (6 ft 4 in)
- Weight: 98 kg (216 lb)
- Position: Centre half back/Centre half forward

Playing career^{1}
Years	Club	Games (Goals)
1986–2000	Geelong	241 (223)

Representative team honours
Years	Team	Games (Goals)
1989–1992	Victoria	7 (24)
- ^{1} Playing statistics correct to the end of 2000.

Career highlights
- Carji Greeves Medal, 1990; All-Australian, 1992; Geelong captain, 1995–1998

Barry Stoneham (born 9 February 1968) is a former Australian rules footballer who played for the Geelong Football Club between 1986 and 2000.

Stoneham appeared 241 times for Geelong in the AFL and kicked 223 goals.

Stoneham developed into one of the top-flight centre half-forwards in the game. He was a strong overhead mark and reliable kick on both sides of his body. He knew how to play his position and was considered by many as the hardest on the field.

Recruited from local football nursery St Joseph's, Stoneham had a stellar career, playing 241 matches from 1986 to 2000 and captaining the club in 1996 (co-captain with Gary Ablett) and 1997–1998. He played at centre half-forward, in the ruck, and sometimes at centre half-back. He was arguably at the peak of his powers from 1989 to 1992 as a mobile centre half-forward and relief ruckman, playing several State games in this period, winning the Geelong best and fairest in 1990 and All-Australian selection in 1992. Off the field, Stoneham made forays into the food industry, in 1993 operating the short-lived Kebazza's on Shannon Avenue, Geelong West, a stall that served kebabs and Middle Eastern cuisine, and going into business with Billy Brownless in 1994 with Geelong CBD cafe/restaurant Players on Malop.

Stoneham also had a fierce rivalry with West Coast Eagles All-Australian centre half-back Glen Jakovich as well as with Wayne Carey. Stoneham's rivalry with Jakovich was highly anticipated when West Coast met Geelong.

Stoneham suffered a shocking injury in August 1994, breaking his leg after landing awkwardly from a marking contest in a game against Fitzroy at Princes Park. The injury and complications kept Stoneham out of action for the whole of the 1995 season. He made his comeback in round 1, 1996, and gradually improved his form. Stoneham was never the same after his leg injury, although his performances were of a sound standard and his leadership on the ground was well respected. He called it a day after Geelong's narrow loss to Hawthorn at the Docklands in the 2000 Elimination Final, the first finals match played at the Docklands.

Stoneham has again joined forces with Brownless to form the Brownless Stoneham Club in 2012, a club that will hold functions for Geelong supporters.

In 2020, he was named in the St Joseph's College team of champions, recognising the best VFL/AFL players to have attended the school.

== Honours ==
- Carji Greeves Medal 1990
- All-Australian team 1992
- VFL/AFL Team of the Year 1989
- Victorian representative 7 times
- Geelong captain 1995-1998
- Played in 2 Grand Finals for Geelong Football Club
- Geelong Football Club Best and Fairest- 1990
- Geelong Football Club Hall of Fame
