= Billy Brownless =

Australian rules footballer and media presenter (born 1967)

Personal information
- Full name: Anthony William Brownless
- Born: 28 January 1967 (age 59); Jerilderie, New South Wales
- Original team: Jerilderie (Murray Football League)/Assumption College
- Height: 192 cm (6 ft 4 in)
- Weight: 102 kg (225 lb)

Playing career^{1}
Years	Club	Games (Goals)
1986–1997	Geelong	198 (441)

Representative team honours
Years	Team	Games (Goals)
1988–1992	New South Wales	3 (3)
1993	NSW/ACT	1
1995	Allies	1 (5)
- ^{1} Playing statistics correct to the end of 1997.

Career highlights
- All-Australian Team: 1991; 2× Geelong leading goal kicker: 1991, 1992; Geelong Football Club Hall of Fame

Anthony William Brownless (born 28 January 1967) is a former Australian rules footballer and radio and television media personality who represented Geelong in the Australian Football League (AFL) during the 1980s and 1990s.

== Early life ==
Brownless was born and raised in Jerilderie, a rural town in New South Wales. He boarded for three years in Kilmore, Victoria, at Assumption College, one of Australia's most renowned "football nurseries", a school which has a strong tradition of producing footballers who have gone on to play in the AFL. In 1984, his final year at the school, Brownless kicked 155 goals for the school team. In 1985 when he played football for his local team, the Jerilderie Football Club, when it was part of the Murray Football League, Brownless kicked 142 goals, where he won the goalkicking award, was runner up in the league best and fairest award and played in Jerildere's losing 1985 grand final side.

== Career ==
=== VFL/AFL ===
Geelong asked Brownless to come and train, but instead he chose to return home to Jerilderie to be with family and friends and play a season of senior football before going to Geelong. During the 1985 season, he kicked 148 goals for the Jerilderie senior team while working as a farmhand. Jerilderie made it to the grand final but lost. Brownless kicked six of the team's nine goals despite having injured an ankle in the semi-final.

Brownless moved to Geelong in time for the 1986 VFL season and began working as a groundsman at Kardinia Park. He said that playing for Geelong was a natural progression for him because of the town's rural atmosphere:

It's really like a big country town and the club's a lot like a country club. You're all behind one another and you're all pretty close. It's a good feeling.

Brownless made his senior VFL debut in Round 1, 1986 and quickly made a name for himself as a strong full-forward, winning the Cats' best first year player award that year. He went on to play 198 games and kick 441 goals, putting him fifth in Geelong's all-time goalkicking list, behind Gary Ablett (1021), Doug Wade (834) Tom Hawkins (796) and Steve Johnson (452).

One of Brownless' fondest memories was kicking a goal after the siren against Footscray in their 1994 qualifying final. With Geelong trailing by one point, he marked the ball within scoring range with just seconds left and kicked a goal to send Geelong through to the next stage of the finals. While the Cats eventually made it to the grand final, they lost that match. Brownless played in four losing grand final teams with Geelong.

Brownless "retired“ in 1997 at 30 years of age, although the reason for the retirement was because he wasn't required at the club for the 1998 AFL Season.

Brownless has the record for most goals in a game at the Gabba, with 11.

=== State of Origin ===
Brownless first played State of Origin in 1988 for New South Wales. Playing in the State of Origin Carnival that year, he kicked three goals in the tournament, two in the first against South Australia and one in the second against Western Australia. In 1993 he again played in the State of Origin Carnival, being selected for NSW/ACT against Victoria. With Wayne Carey and John Longmire in the side, Brownless played at centre half back. In 1995 he kicked five goals and was named in the best players for Allies in a win over Western Australia.

== Statistics ==
Legend
G	Goals	K	Kicks	D	Disposals	T	Tackles
B	Behinds	H	Handballs	M	Marks

Season	Team	No.	Games	Totals							Averages (per game)						
Season	Team	No.	Games	G	B	K	H	D	M	T	G	B	K	H	D	M	T
1986	Geelong	16	14	32	16	112	50	162	80	0	2.3	1.1	8.0	3.6	11.6	5.7	0.0
1987	Geelong	16	14	30	22	112	48	160	75	20	2.1	1.6	8.0	3.4	11.4	5.4	1.4
1988	Geelong	16	7	14	7	44	21	65	28	6	2.0	1.0	6.3	3.0	9.3	4.0	0.9
1989	Geelong	16	26	46	34	228	120	348	143	19	1.8	1.3	8.8	4.6	13.4	5.5	0.7
1990	Geelong	16	22	35	22	241	143	384	122	21	1.6	1.0	11.0	17.5	6.5	5.5	1.0
1991	Geelong	16	20	81	54	223	72	295	142	13	4.1	2.7	11.2	3.6	14.8	7.1	0.7
1992	Geelong	16	24	79	46	213	100	313	141	16	3.3	1.9	8.9	4.2	13.0	5.9	0.7
1993	Geelong	16	11	20	14	100	43	143	51	7	1.8	1.3	9.1	3.9	13.0	4.6	0.6
1994	Geelong	16	17	34	21	153	45	198	84	11	2.0	1.2	9.0	2.6	11.6	4.9	0.6
1995	Geelong	16	24	45	36	208	114	322	126	32	1.9	1.5	8.7	4.8	13.4	5.3	1.3
1996	Geelong	16	11	20	11	88	135	47	51	14	1.8	1.0	8.0	4.3	12.3	4.6	1.3
1997	Geelong	16	8	5	8	35	19	54	15	2	0.6	1.0	4.4	2.4	6.8	1.9	0.3
Career			198	441	291	1757	822	2579	1058	161	2.2	1.5	8.9	4.2	13.0	5.3	0.9

== Media career and life after football ==
When Brownless retired from football he moved into the media, appearing regularly on The Footy Show. On The Footy Show he appeared in "The House of Bulger" segment as the family's matriarch Joybell Bulger.

He joined 95.5 K-Rock in Geelong as a sales representative. Soon, on their "Big Mattress" breakfast show, he co-hosted a sport/comedy segment called "On The Bench" with ex-Geelong player Dwayne Russell and the Essendon fanatic "Ferret" (Russell Taylor), twice a week. A long list of Geelong players were included in "On The Bench" as special guests including Barry Stoneham, Tim McGrath and Paul Couch. He regularly appears on the station promoting Wombat Gully plant farm Geelong.

In 1992 he became the inaugural winner of the Mirrool Silo Kick in the Riverina, kicking an Aussie Rules football 32 metres plus over the Mirrool Silos.

In August 1999, it was reported that due to Brownless' connections in the local political scene, both the Australian Labor Party (ALP) and the ruling Liberal Party of Australia were keen to recruit Brownless into politics, despite his limited experience. Labor leader Steve Bracks, who would go on to win the state election that year, was a Geelong supporter, and Brownless had persuaded the then Premier Jeff Kennett's wife, Felicity, to become Geelong's female number one ticket holder.

By 2005, Brownless had featured on The Sunday Footy Show as well as earning continual appearances on The Footy Show. He also co-hosted Morning Glory, a weekday breakfast show on Melbourne radio station SEN 1116. Brownless finished his 5-day-a-week stint in November 2008. Brownless appeared on Before the Bounce, a weekly football show on Foxtel alongside Jason Dunstall and Danny Frawley until the end of the 2008 AFL season.

In May 2008, Brownless was added as a regular on the Thursday night AFL Footy Show to replace an incapacitated Sam Newman, but he was relegated to guest panelist upon Newman's return. From 2009 until the show's termination in 2019, Brownless had once again become a regular alongside Shane Crawford to replace Trevor Marmalade, alternating each week with Crawford and, since 2012, Matthew Lloyd.

In March 2010, Brownless joined Triple M Melbourne's new drive show The Rush Hour with James Brayshaw.

Brownless bought the Cumberland Hotel in Castlemaine, Victoria. He also owns the Cremorne Hotel in Newtown, Victoria

In January 2020, Brownless appeared in the sixth season of the Australian version of I'm a Celebrity...Get Me Out of Here!.

In September 2021, Brownless announced he was leaving The Sunday Footy Show and the Nine Network after 27 years with the network.

== Personal life ==
Brownless was married to ex-wife Nicky for 18 years. They have two daughters and two sons. The couple made headlines in 2016 after it came to light that, after 18 years of marriage, they had separated in late 2015, and that Nicky had gone on to have a relationship with one of Brownless's colleagues, Garry Lyon. The relationship caused a bitter falling-out between Brownless and Lyon, causing Lyon to leave The Footy Show.

In 2024, Brownless began a relationship with Crystle Fleur.

== See also ==
- After-the-siren kicks in Australian rules football

== Bibliography ==
- Brownless, Anthony William (2008), Billy's book for blokes, Allen & Unwin, ISBN 978-1-74175-570-1
- Brownless, Anthony William (2009), A man walks into a bar- : the ultimate collection (1st ed.), Allen & Unwin, ISBN 978-1-74237-156-6
- Brownless, Anthony William (2009), The best a man walks into a bar jokes, Allen & Unwin, ISBN 978-1-74237-156-6
- Brownless, Anthony William (27 July 2011), Billy's dictionary for blokes : an A to Z of essential words for the modern man, Penguin Books (Australia) (published 2011), ISBN 978-1-921518-80-5
