= Peter Wilson (Australian rules footballer) =

Australian rules footballer, born 1963

Personal information
- Full name: Peter Eric McKenzie Wilson
- Born: 15 November 1963 (age 62)
- Original team: East Fremantle (WAFL)
- Height: 183 cm (6 ft 0 in)
- Weight: 88 kg (194 lb)

Playing career^{1}
Years	Club	Games (Goals)
1982–1986, 1992, 1995	East Fremantle	102 (104)
1987–1989	Richmond	54 (39)
1990–1995	West Coast Eagles	117 (84)
Total		273 (227)

Coaching career^{3}
Years	Club	Games (W–L–D)
1998–1999	Swan Districts (Westar Rules)	40 (16–24–0)
- ^{1} Playing statistics correct to the end of 1995.^{3} Coaching statistics correct as of 1999.

Career highlights
- West Coast premierships 1992, 1994; All-Australian 1986; Represented Western Australia 9 times

Peter Eric McKenzie Wilson (born 15 November 1963) is a former Australian rules footballer who represented Richmond and West Coast in the Australian Football League (AFL). He wore the number 9 guersey.

Recruited to Western Australian powerhouse East Fremantle from Lynwood, Wilson is best known for his performance in the 1992 Grand Final, played at the Melbourne Cricket Ground, where he kicked two goals, including a famous "over-the-head" kick in the third quarter.

Wilson played 117 games for the Eagles and 54 for the Richmond Tigers in the AFL. Prior to this he played in the West Australian Football League for East Fremantle Football Club, representing the club 101 times (including the 1985 Premiership). Wilson was named All-Australian in 1986 where he played for Australia against Ireland three times in Ireland's first tour of Australia.

He was named in the West Coast Eagles team of the decade in 1996. The number 9 guernsey was later worn by former Eagles captain, Ben Cousins.

After he retired as a player, Wilson became coach of Westar Rules club Swan Districts for the 1998 and 1999 seasons. Late in the 1999 season as Swan Districts’ administration was undergoing numerous personnel changes, feeling the black and whites needed a fully professional coach and that he could not do that job, Wilson resigned his coaching position after having led Swans to seventh and sixth in a nine-club competition.

== Statistics ==
Legend
G	Goals	K	Kicks	D	Disposals	T	Tackles
B	Behinds	H	Handballs	M	Marks

Season	Team	No.	Games	Totals							Averages (per game)							Votes
Season	Team	No.	Games	G	B	K	H	D	M	T	G	B	K	H	D	M	T	Votes
1987	Richmond	5	19	27	16	213	108	321	93	28	1.4	0.8	11.2	5.7	16.9	4.9	1.5	6
1988	Richmond	19	16	4	6	229	108	337	76	20	0.3	0.4	14.3	6.8	21.1	4.8	1.3	3
1989	Richmond	19	19	8	6	212	89	301	60	18	0.4	0.3	11.2	4.7	15.8	3.2	0.9	0
1990	West Coast	9	19	18	12	244	111	355	66	27	0.9	0.6	12.8	5.8	18.7	3.5	1.4	4
1991	West Coast	9	22	23	23	245	114	359	83	31	1.0	1.0	11.1	5.2	16.3	3.8	1.4	1
1992†	West Coast	9	14	15	5	157	77	234	43	28	1.1	0.4	11.2	5.5	16.7	3.1	2.0	0
1993	West Coast	9	22	6	11	284	98	382	81	43	0.3	0.5	12.9	4.5	17.4	3.7	2.0	1
1994†	West Coast	9	24	14	19	278	109	387	87	49	0.6	0.8	11.6	4.5	16.1	3.6	2.0	3
1995	West Coast	9	16	8	11	120	65	185	43	26	0.5	0.7	7.5	4.1	11.6	2.7	1.6	0
Career			171	123	109	1982	879	2861	632	270	0.7	0.6	11.6	5.1	16.7	3.7	1.6	18
