= List of West Coast Eagles records =

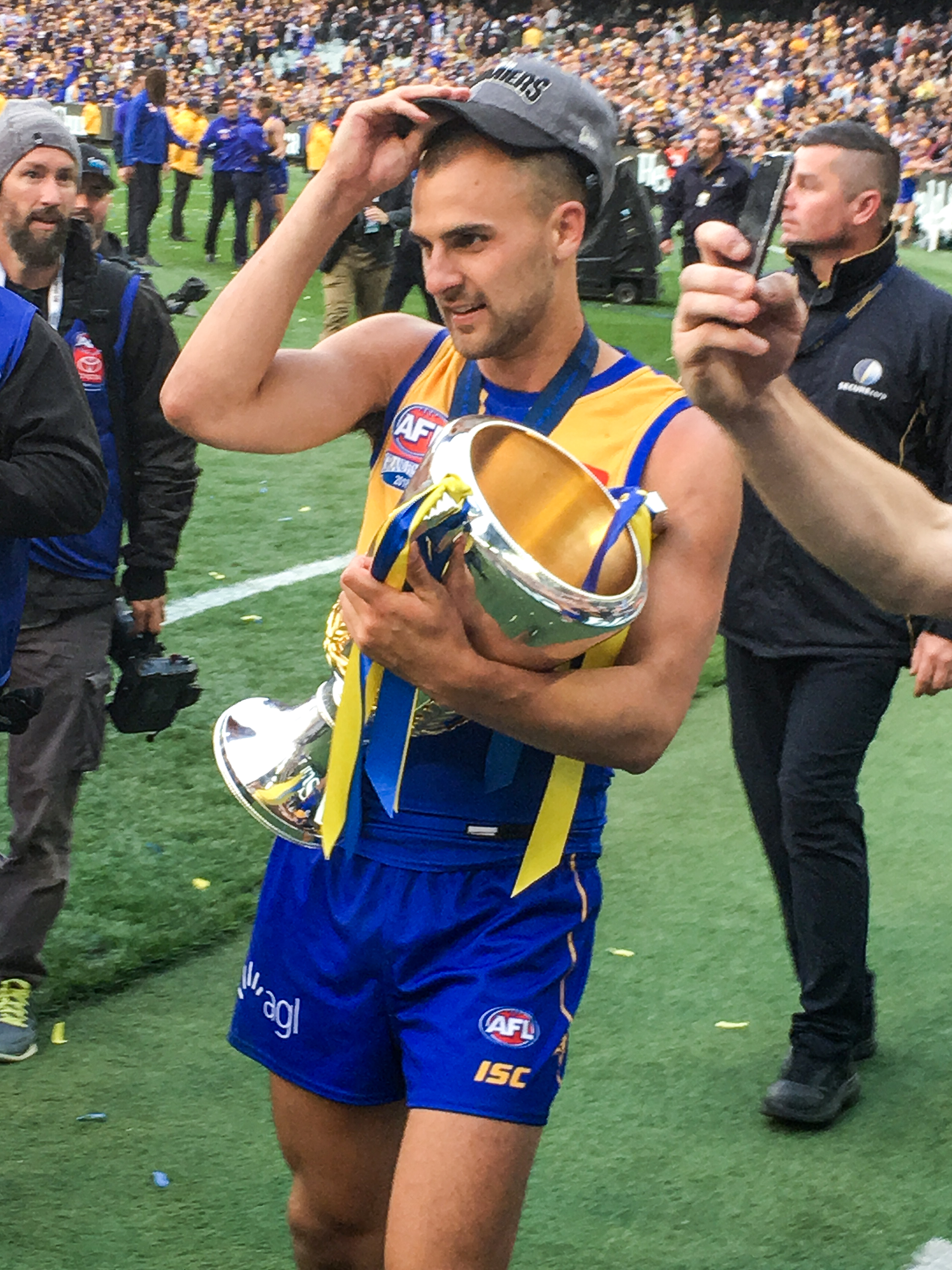
Dom Sheed holding the premiership cup of the 2018 AFL Grand Final, the fourth grand final won by West Coast

This is a list of records and statistics achieved by the West Coast Eagles in the VFL/AFL from their debut in 1987. All statistics are updated to round 6 of the 2026 season unless otherwise stated.

== All-time games table ==
Team	P	W	D	L	F	A	%	W%
Adelaide	58	30	0	28	5217	5142	101.46	51.72
Brisbane Bears	16	13	1	2	1893	1248	145.84	84.38
Brisbane Lions	39	22	0	17	3727	3477	107.19	56.41
Carlton	53	26	0	27	4734	4866	97.29	49.06
Collingwood	62	31	1	30	5465	5391	101.37	50.81
Essendon	62	27	0	35	5670	5856	96.82	43.55
Fitzroy	15	9	0	6	1442	1090	132.29	60.00
Fremantle	62	33	0	29	5439	5146	105.69	53.23
Geelong	61	27	1	33	5080	6180	82.20	45.08
Gold Coast	10	11	1	8	1930	1737	111.11	57.50
Greater Western Sydney	18	10	0	8	1664	1534	108.47	55.56
Hawthorn	58	30	0	28	4877	5338	91.36	51.72
Melbourne	61	38	0	23	6087	5232	116.34	62.30
North Melbourne (Kangaroos)	59	32	0	27	5586	5180	107.84	54.24
Port Adelaide	41	17	0	24	3360	3797	88.49	41.46
Richmond	53	28	0	25	4973	4759	104.50	52.83
St Kilda	57	33	1	23	5390	4928	109.38	58.77
Sydney	58	22	0	36	4538	5427	83.62	37.93
Western Bulldogs (Footscray)	62	37	1	24	5974	5343	111.81	60.48
Total	915	476	6	433	83046	81721	101.62	52.35

== Team records ==
Records listed only include matches played against other AFL teams in home and away or finals matches.

=== Scoring records ===
Highest scores
№	G	B	T	Opponent	Venue	Match
1	29	18	192	Brisbane Bears	WACA Ground	Rd 3, 1988
2	30	8	188	GWS	Subiaco Oval	Rd 8, 2014
3	29	13	187	Adelaide	WACA Ground	Rd 4, 2000
3	28	19	187	Carlton	Subiaco Oval	Rd 15, 2003
5	29	12	186	Brisbane Bears	WACA Ground	Rd 20, 1992
6	27	17	179	Port Adelaide	Subiaco Oval	Rd 10, 2005
7	28	10	178	Fremantle	Subiaco Oval	Rd 6, 2000
8	26	21	177	Adelaide	Subiaco Oval	Rd 19, 1995
8	27	15	177	Melbourne	MCG	Rd 3, 2013
10	26	19	175	St Kilda	Subiaco Oval	Rd 22, 1987
10	26	19	175	Essendon	WACA Ground	Rd 2, 1988
10	26	19	175	Western Bulldogs	Subiaco Oval	Rd 9, 2011
10	28	7	175	Brisbane Lions	Subiaco Oval	Rd 18, 2012

Lowest scores
№	G	B	T	Opponent	Venue	Year
1	1	12	18	Essendon	Windy Hill	Rd 15, 1989
2	3	5	23	Footscray	Western Oval	Rd 23, 1992
3	3	8	26	Sydney	Kardinia Park	Rd 16, 2021
3	4	2	26	Hawthorn	York Park	Rd 10, 2023
4	3	11	29	St Kilda	Waverley Park	Rd 18, 1992
5	3	12	30	Carlton	Princes Park	Rd 10, 2001
5	4	6	30	Brisbane Lions	The Gabba	Rd 8, 2022
5	3	12	30	Western Bulldogs	Docklands Stadium	Rd 2, 2024
8	4	7	31	Adelaide	Football Park	Rd 14, 1997
9	4	8	32	Geelong	Kardinia Park	Rd 4, 2014
9	4	8	32	Western Bulldogs	Docklands Stadium	Rd 23, 2025

== Individual records ==
Records listed only include players who played at least one game for the club.

Key

Currently on the club's list.

=== Games records ===
==== Most games overall ====
G: games played

Most games overall
№	G	Name	
1	333	Shannon Hurn	2006–2023
2	298	Jack Darling	2011–2024
3	290	Dean Cox	2001–2014
4	280	Andrew Gaff	2011–2024
5	276	Glen Jakovich	1991–2004
6	271	Josh Kennedy	2008–2022
7	270	Darren Glass	2000–2014
8	267	Guy McKenna	1988–2000
9	265	Drew Banfield	1993–2006
10	261^	Jamie Cripps	2013–

=== Goalkicking records ===
==== Most goals overall ====
G: Goals
B: Behinds

Most goals overall
№	G	B	Name	Years
1	712	384	Josh Kennedy	2008–2022
2	532	278	Jack Darling	2011–2024
3	514	354	Peter Sumich	1989–1997
4	441	226	Mark LeCras	2005–2018
5	389	227	Phil Matera	1996–2005
6	323^	219	Jamie Cripps	2013–
7	281	213	Quinten Lynch	2002–2012
8	259	205	Chris Lewis	1987–2000
9	237	161	Brett Heady	1990–1999
10	217	166	Peter Matera	1990–2002

==== Most goals in a season ====
G: Goals
B: Behinds

Most goals in a season
№	G	B	Name	Year
1	111	89	Peter Sumich	1991
2	95	42	Scott Cummings^{[A]}	1999
3	90	61	Peter Sumich	1990
4	82	46	Peter Sumich	1992
4	82	37	Josh Kennedy	2016
6	80	55	Josh Kennedy^{[A]}	2015
7	76	57	Peter Sumich	1993
8	73	47	Ross Glendinning	1988
9	69	39	Josh Kennedy	2017
10	65	33	Quinten Lynch	2006

^{A} Cummings won the Coleman Medal in 1999, Kennedy won the award in 2015 and 2016.

==== Most goals in a match ====
G: Goals
B: Behinds

Most goals in a match
№	G	B	Name	Opponent	Venue	Year	Rd
1	14	1	Scott Cummings	Adelaide	WACA Ground	2000	4
2	13	3	Peter Sumich	Footscray	WACA Ground	1991	13
3	12	2	Mark LeCras	Essendon	Docklands Stadium	2010	16
4	11	8	Peter Sumich	Essendon	MCG	1992	15
4	11	0	Josh Kennedy	GWS	Subiaco Oval	2014	8
6	10	3	Josh Kennedy	Western Bulldogs	Subiaco Oval	2011	9
6	10	2	Scott Cummings	Fremantle	Subiaco Oval	2000	6
6	10	1	Josh Kennedy	Carlton	Subiaco Oval	2015	2
9	8	A West Coast player has kicked 8 goals on 10 occasions.					

=== Statistics ===
==== Kicks ====
Most kicks overall
№	K	Name	Years
1	4569	Shannon Hurn	2006–2023
2	4172	Andrew Gaff	2011–2024
3	3539	Peter Matera	1990–2002
4	3323	Glen Jakovich	1989–2007
5	3203	Chris Mainwaring	1987–1999

==== Handballs ====
Most handballs overall
№	H	Name	Years
1	3816	Matt Priddis	2006–2017
2	3020	Andrew Gaff	2011–2024
3	2582	Luke Shuey	2011–2023
4	2325	Daniel Kerr	2001–2013
5	2222	Ben Cousins	1996–2007

==== Disposals ====
Most disposals overall
№	D	Name	Years
1	7192	Andrew Gaff	2011–2024
2	6279	Matt Priddis	2006–2017
3	6129	Shannon Hurn	2006–2023
4	5760	Luke Shuey	2011–2023
5	5359	Ben Cousins	1996–2007

==== Marks ====
Most marks overall
№	H	Name	Years
1	1783	Shannon Hurn	2006–2023
2	1541	Dean Cox	2001–2014
3	1530	Josh Kennedy	2008–2022
4	1431	Jack Darling	2011–2024
5	1345	Andrew Gaff	2011–2024

==== Tackles ====
Most tackles overall
№	H	Name	Years
1	1629	Matt Priddis	2006–2017
2	1218	Luke Shuey	2010–2023
3	1004	Jamie Cripps	2013–present
4	947	Elliot Yeo	2014–present
5	841	Jack Darling	2011–2024

==== Hit-outs ====
Most hit-outs overall
№	H/O	Name	Years
1	6628	Dean Cox	2001–2014
2	5549	Nic Naitanui	2009–2022
3	2139	Michael Gardiner	1997–2006
4	1753	Bailey Williams	2020–present
5	1268	Scott Lycett	2011–2018

=== Physical records ===
==== Height ====
Height refers to the player's highest maximum or lowest minimum playing height:

Tallest players
№	Ht	Name	Years
1	204 cm	Dean Cox	2001–2014
2	203 cm	Ilija Grgic	1997–1998
2	203 cm	Scott Lycett	2011–2018
2	203 cm	Archer Reid	1997–1998
2	203 cm	Luke Strnadica	2022
2	203 cm	Harry Barnett	2023–present
3	202 cm	Laurie Keene	1987–1990

Shortest players
№	Ht	Name	Years
1	169 cm	Ryan Neates	2012
2	170 cm	Wally Matera	1987–1988
3	171 cm	Phil Matera	1996–2005
4	172 cm	Malakai Champion	2025–present
5	173 cm	Trent Nichols	1992
5	173 cm	Richard Taylor	2001–2002
5	173 cm	Liam Baker	2025–present

==== Age ====
Oldest players (at time of last game)
№	Y	D	Name	Game
1	35	356	Shannon Hurn	Rd 24, 2023
2	34	347	Josh Kennedy	Rd 21, 2022
3	34	339	Sam Mitchell	SF, 2017
4	34	336	Drew Petrie	SF, 2017
5	33	361	Jamie Cripps	Rd 6, 2026^

Youngest players (on debut)
№	Y	D	Name	Match
1	16	268	David Wirrpanda	1996–2009
2	17	274	Andrew Embley	1999–2013
3	17	288	Michael Gardiner	1997–2006
4	17	296	Ben Cousins	1996–2007
5	17	320	Daniel Kerr	2001–2013
