= Tony Evans (Australian footballer, born 1969) =

Australian rules footballer

Personal information
- Full name: Anthony John Evans
- Born: 14 June 1969 (age 57)
- Original team: Claremont (WAFL)
- Height: 175 cm (5 ft 9 in)
- Weight: 82 kg (181 lb)

Playing career^{1}
Years	Club	Games (Goals)
1989–1998	Claremont	75 (116)
1991–1998	West Coast Eagles	108 (78)
Total		183 (194)
- ^{1} Playing statistics correct to the end of 1998.

Career highlights
- 2× AFL premiership player: 1992, 1994; 2× WAFL premiership player: 1989, 1991

Anthony John Evans (born 14 June 1969) is a former Australian rules footballer who played with West Coast in the AFL during the 1990s. He was named on the forward line on West Coast's 'Team of the Decade'. While statistically he had an unremarkable career, he is remembered for his brilliant performances in the club's first two premierships in 1992 and 1994, where he collected 23 disposals and three goals, and 20 disposals and three goals respectively. In the WAFL, he kicked 116 goals from 75 games and was a two-time premiership player with Claremont.

== Statistics ==
Legend
G	Goals	K	Kicks	D	Disposals	T	Tackles
B	Behinds	H	Handballs	M	Marks

Season	Team	No.	Games	Totals							Averages (per game)							Votes
Season	Team	No.	Games	G	B	K	H	D	M	T	G	B	K	H	D	M	T	Votes
1991	West Coast	40	2	1	5	15	6	21	5	1	0.5	2.5	7.5	3.0	10.5	2.5	0.5	0
1992†	West Coast	18	16	18	8	156	105	261	43	41	1.1	0.5	9.8	6.6	16.3	2.7	2.6	5
1993	West Coast	18	19	16	5	175	112	287	59	53	0.8	0.3	9.2	5.9	15.1	3.1	2.8	0
1994†	West Coast	18	14	12	7	100	74	174	31	23	0.9	0.5	7.1	5.3	12.4	2.2	1.6	0
1995	West Coast	18	16	7	9	133	94	227	41	35	0.4	0.6	8.3	5.9	14.2	2.6	2.2	0
1996	West Coast	18	22	17	11	212	152	364	67	52	0.8	0.5	9.6	6.9	16.5	3.0	2.4	3
1997	West Coast	18	14	7	5	125	66	191	33	29	0.5	0.4	8.9	4.7	13.6	2.4	2.1	0
1998	West Coast	18	5	0	0	23	31	54	6	5	0.0	0.0	4.6	6.2	10.8	1.2	1.0	0
Career			108	78	50	939	640	1579	285	239	0.7	0.5	8.7	5.9	14.6	2.6	2.2	8
