= Ryan Turnbull (footballer) =

Australian rules footballer (born 1971)

Personal information
- Full name: Ryan Edwin Turnbull
- Born: 23 September 1971 (age 55); Mount Lawley, Western Australia
- Original team: Karrinyup Saints JFC
- Draft: pre-draft selection, 1989 (West Coast)
- Height: 195 cm (6 ft 5 in)
- Weight: 100 kg (220 lb)
- Positions: Ruckman, centre half-back

Playing career^{1}
Years	Club	Games (Goals)
1989–90	Claremont	23 (17)
1991–2004	East Perth	155 (84)
1991–2001	West Coast	129 (39)
Total		307 (140)

Representative team honours
Years	Team	Games (Goals)
1992–2003	Western Australia	6 (1)
- ^{1} Playing statistics correct to the end of 2004.

Career highlights
- Claremont premiership side 1989; Claremont reserves premiership side 1990; East Perth best and fairest 1991, 1993, 1999; West Coast Eagles premiership side 1994; 2nd Sandover Medal 1999, 2002; Sandover Medal 2001; East Perth premiership side 2001, 2002; Simpson Medal 2001, 2002; Western Australia captain 2002; East Perth co-captain 2004

Ryan Edwin Turnbull (born 23 September 1971) is a former Australian rules footballer who represented the West Coast Eagles in the Australian Football League (AFL). Turnbull was a member of the Eagles' 1994 premiership side, and was the club's first-choice ruckman for much of the 1990s. He also played with the Claremont and East Perth Football Clubs in the West Australian Football League (WAFL), and was awarded the Sandover Medal in 2001 as the best player in the competition, as well as winning the Simpson Medal in 2001 and 2002 as the best player in the league's grand final. In State of Origin football, Turnbull represented Western Australia in five matches between 1992 and 1999, and captained a Western Australian representative team in 2003.

== Early life ==
Turnbull was born to John Turnbull and Kaye Holdsworth on 23 September 1971, in Mount Lawley, Western Australia. His father played 209 games for Swan Districts in the WAFL, including the 1961, 1962 and 1963 premierships. His mother was the daughter of Ted Holdsworth, who played 143 games for Swan Districts, kicking 532 goals. Turnbull was educated at Christ Church Grammar School in Claremont, Western Australia, and played in the school's First XVIII in 1987. He also played junior football for the Karrinyup Saints Junior Football Club.

== Football career ==
Turnbull played for the University Football Club in the Western Australian Amateur Football League (WAAFL) in 1989 before making his debut for Claremont in the WAFL midway through the season. He played in Claremont's 1989 premiership before being selected by the West Coast Eagles with a compensatory pre-draft selection, along with Peter Mann. In the 1990 season, he did not manage to break into West Coast's senior side, or hold his place in Claremont's senior side, but ended up playing in Claremont's 1990 reserves premiership. Turnbull switched to East Perth in the WAFL for the 1991 season after a difference of opinion between Claremont coach Gerard Neesham and West Coast coach Michael Malthouse on how he was being used at WAFL level. Turnbull made his debut for West Coast in round seven of the 1991 season, against Hawthorn at Princes Park, as the youngest member of the team, gathering nine disposals and effecting four hit-outs partnered with Dean Irving. He played four further games in the 1991 season, being kept out of the side by older, more experienced key-position players such as Michael Brennan, Ashley McIntosh, Glen Jakovich, Dean Irving and Stevan Jackson. Turnbull won the F. D. Book Medal in 1991 as East Perth's best and fairest.

Turnbull managed six games in 1992, including five of the Eagles' first seven, but was again kept out of the side by first-choice ruckman Paul Harding. He did not play for the Eagles in 1993, mainly due to the form of Irving and Harding, but managed to win a second F. D. Book Medal. He was a favourite for the 1993 Sandover Medal, but lost to Robbie West, finishing seventh overall. He broke into the Eagles' side in the 1994 season, playing in all 23 of the Eagles' games, including the 1994 Grand Final, which the Eagles won by 80 points. He received his first votes for the Brownlow Medal in round 18, 1994, gaining one vote for 23-hit-out game against Richmond. Turnbull once again played in all of the Eagles' games in the 1995 season as their first-choice ruckman. He played the first game of the 1996 season, but was dropped for Jason Ball. He returned to the side in round 11 after kicking seven goals in seven games with East Perth, and played all but one of the Eagles' remaining games, filling in for the injured Glen Jakovich at centre half-back. He was named as the ruckman in the Eagles' Team of the Decade, announced in 1996 to coincide with the AFL's centenary celebrations. He again played in every West Coast Eagles game in 1997, playing behind Michael Gardiner as the Eagles' back-up ruckman.

Turnbull played the first seven games of the 1998 season, again as a back-up ruckman to Gardiner, but was dropped after a round 7 game against Adelaide where he only managed one disposal and one hit-out. He was recalled for the round 12 game against Hawthorn, but re-dropped after again managing only one disposal and one hit-out. He spent the rest of the 1998 season with East Perth in the WAFL. Turnbull did not play for the Eagles in the 1999 season, with Gardiner and Jason Ball the first-choice ruck combination. He played 17 games for East Perth in the WAFL, and was considered one of the favourites for the Sandover Medal, eventually losing to Gus Seebeck by one vote. He also won a third F. D. Book Medal as East Perth's best and fairest. Turnbull re-established himself in the Eagles' team for the 2000 season, playing all 22 games. He played as the first-choice ruckman in the second half of the season after an injury to Gardiner.

Turnbull was unable to regain a place in the Eagles' side in the 2001 season playing only three games, behind Gardiner, Dean Cox and David Sierakowski, before being de-listed at the end of the season. He played 17 games for East Perth in 2001, including in the 2001 premiership team, winning the Simpson Medal as the best on ground in the Grand Final. He also won the Sandover Medal for the best player in the WAFL. Turnbull played 19 games for East Perth in 2002, again winning the Simpson Medal in East Perth's Grand Final victory. He continued to play for the Royals in 2003 and 2004, but was impacted by an eye injury sustained in the 2003 finals series. He retired from football at the end of the 2004 season.

== Statistics ==
Legend
G	Goals	K	Kicks	D	Disposals	T	Tackles
B	Behinds	H	Handballs	M	Marks	H/O	Hit-outs

Season	Team	No.	Games	Totals								Averages (per game)								Votes
Season	Team	No.	Games	G	B	K	H	D	M	T	H/O	G	B	K	H	D	M	T	H/O	Votes
1991	West Coast	50	5	1	0	33	17	50	12	5	5	0.2	0.0	6.6	3.4	10.0	2.4	1.0	1.0	0
1992	West Coast	50	6	2	1	31	14	45	7	5	19	0.3	0.2	5.2	2.3	7.5	1.2	0.8	3.2	0
1993	West Coast	50	0	–	–	–	–	–	–	–	–	–	–	–	–	–	–	–	–	–
1994†	West Coast	50	23	6	5	146	55	201	45	20	267	0.3	0.2	6.3	2.4	8.7	2.0	0.9	11.6	1
1995	West Coast	50	24	5	13	216	71	287	78	21	268	0.2	0.5	9.0	3.0	12.0	3.3	0.9	11.2	0
1996	West Coast	50	14	5	4	89	34	123	29	11	145	0.4	0.3	6.4	2.4	8.8	2.1	0.8	10.4	0
1997	West Coast	50	24	6	1	161	58	219	55	19	123	0.3	0.0	6.7	2.4	9.1	2.3	0.8	5.1	0
1998	West Coast	50	8	1	2	22	17	39	14	3	43	0.1	0.3	2.8	2.1	4.9	1.8	0.4	5.4	0
1999	West Coast	50	0	–	–	–	–	–	–	–	–	–	–	–	–	–	–	–	–	–
2000	West Coast	50	22	12	3	163	79	242	61	16	274	0.5	0.1	7.4	3.6	11.0	2.8	0.7	12.5	0
2001	West Coast	50	3	1	0	9	8	17	4	0	12	0.3	0.0	3.0	2.7	5.7	1.3	0.0	4.0	0
Career			129	39	29	870	353	1223	305	100	1156	0.3	0.2	6.7	2.7	9.5	2.4	0.8	9.0	1

== Post-playing career ==
Turnbull is currently a commentator for ABC Sport, commentating on WAFL coverage. In 2010, he was inducted into the East Perth Football Club's Hall of Fame.
