= Irwin Lewis =

Indigenous Australian artist (1939–2020)

- Born: 21 April 1939; Morawa, Western Australia
- Died: 28 January 2020 (aged 80)
- Known for: Painting, Ceramics
- Movement: Indigenous Australian art

Irwin Tasman Lewis (21 April 1939 – 28 January 2020) was an indigenous Australian artist, who was previously a notable scholar, sportsman and public servant. Best known as the father of Australian rules footballer Chris Lewis, a member of the West Coast Eagles' AFL premiership-winning teams in 1992 and 1994, he has been described as "something of a celebrity in Perth".

== Early life ==
Lewis was born on 21 April 1939 in Morawa, Western Australia, a mid west country town approximately 400 kilometres (250 mi) north of the state capital, Perth. A Yamatji, and the second-born in a family of eight children, he undertook his primary and early secondary schooling at the Morawa State School.

In 1953, the Anglican Schools Board awarded Lewis a scholarship, to attend Christ Church Grammar School in Perth as a boarder, commencing in the second year of secondary school. His move to Perth was also supported financially by his parents, the Morawa branch of the Country Women's Association and the Department of Native Welfare.

Lewis was dux of the Junior School, and obtained a Junior Certificate, in 1954. He was awarded a Leaving Certificate two years later. In his final year at Christ Church in 1956, he was a school prefect, and the captain of both the First XI cricket team and First XVIII Australian rules football team. After a minor academic setback, he also satisfied the requirements for matriculation.

In March 1957, with the assistance of a Commonwealth Scholarship, and another scholarship from the National Union of Australian University Students, Lewis became the first Aboriginal student to attend the University of Western Australia (UWA) and lived at St George's College, Perth.

At UWA, Lewis enrolled in the Faculty of Arts, and was a prominent cricketer and footballer. However, he left UWA in 1958 to take up a position in the public service.

== Adult life ==
In the early 1960s, Lewis played in the West Australian Football League, for the Claremont Football Club. He was a member of Claremont's premiership-winning team in 1964. His teammates in that team included Ian Brayshaw (father of James Brayshaw) and John McIntosh (father of Ashley McIntosh).

Between the late 1950s and late 1980s, Lewis became one of Australia's leading indigenous public servants. Meanwhile, his three sons, Clayton, Cameron and Chris, followed their father into the Claremont football team. The best known of the sons, Chris, was also a member of the West Coast Eagles' AFL premiership-winning teams in 1992 and 1994, and, like his father, played in a Claremont premiership-winning team, in 1996.

After working in a variety of areas in Indigenous welfare and development, Lewis retired from the public service in 1989.

== Artist career and death ==
At about the time of his retirement, Lewis commenced a new career as an artist, working as a painter and with ceramics. He was a multiple finalist in the National Aboriginal & Torres Strait Islander Art Award, and a finalist in numerous other contemporary art awards. In January 2020, the Claremont Football Club announced that he had died at the age of 80.

== Collections ==
Lewis's work is included in the following collections:

- Aboriginal Affairs Department Collection
- Art Gallery of Western Australia, Perth
- Australian Institute of Aboriginal and Torres Strait Islander Studies, Canberra
- Australian National Maritime Museum, Sydney
- Berndt Museum of Anthropology, University of Western Australia, Crawley
- City of Stirling Collection, Stirling, Western Australia
- City of Wanneroo Collection, Wanneroo, Western Australia
- King Edward Memorial Hospital for Women Collection, Subiaco, Western Australia
- National Gallery of Victoria, Melbourne
- Royal Perth Hospital Collection, Perth
- Town of Victoria Park Collection, Victoria Park, Western Australia
