= Steven Handley =

Australian rules footballer

Personal information
- Born: 23 July 1970 (age 56)
- Original team: Swan Districts (WAFL)
- Debut: Round 1, 1992, Geelong vs. Hawthorn, at Waverley Park
- Height: 194 cm (6 ft 4 in)
- Weight: 93 kg (205 lb)

Playing career^{1}
Years	Club	Games (Goals)
1992–1996	Geelong	73 (28)
- ^{1} Playing statistics correct to the end of 1996.

Steven Handley (born 23 July 1970) is a former Australian rules footballer who played with Geelong in the AFL during the 1990s.

Handley started his career in the Gold Coast with Queensland Australian Football League (QAFL) club Southport where he was a member of premiership sides in 1989 and 1990. He played some reserves games with the Brisbane Bears before moving to Western Australian Football League (WAFL) club Swan Districts. A key position player who could also ruck, Handley was recruited to Geelong in 1991. He missed out on selection in the 1992 AFL Grand Final due to a shoulder injury but played in Geelong's 1994 and 1995 teams which lost to West Coast and Carlton respectively.

Handley was delisted following the 1997 AFL season.
