= Shane Bond (footballer, born 1975) =

Australian rules footballer (born 1975)

Personal information
- Born: 9 July 1975 (age 51)
- Debut: Round 1, 1994, West Coast vs. Essendon, at the MCG
- Height: 181 cm (5 ft 11 in)
- Weight: 79 kg (174 lb)

Playing career^{1}
Years	Club	Games (Goals)
1994–1996	West Coast	34 (20)
1997–2000	Port Adelaide	57 (11)
Total		91 (31)
- ^{1} Playing statistics correct to the end of 2001.

Career highlights
- AFL Premiership player (1994)

Shane Bond (born 9 July 1975) is a former Australian rules footballer who played for the West Coast Eagles and the Port Adelaide Football Club the Australian Football League (AFL).

Bond is the younger brother of fellow former AFL player Troy Bond.

== AFL career ==
=== West Coast career (1994–1996) ===
Recruited from South Australian National Football League (SANFL) club Port Adelaide, Bond debuted with the West Coast Eagles in 1994, going on to play 34 games and kick 20 goals for the club, as well as playing in the 1994 Grand Final win.

Bond also played 21 games for Western Australian Football League (WAFL) club East Perth whilst at West Coast.

=== Port Adelaide career (1997–2000) ===
Bond was then traded to Port Adelaide when the club joined the AFL in 1997, where he played 57 games between 1997 and 2000.

== Statistics ==
Legend
G	Goals	K	Kicks	D	Disposals	T	Tackles
B	Behinds	H	Handballs	M	Marks

Season	Team	No.	Games	Totals							Averages (per game)							Votes
Season	Team	No.	Games	G	B	K	H	D	M	T	G	B	K	H	D	M	T	Votes
1994†	West Coast	20	21	15	11	129	113	242	44	33	0.7	0.5	6.1	5.4	11.5	2.1	1.6	0
1995	West Coast	20	10	5	10	46	52	98	21	17	0.5	1.0	4.6	5.2	9.8	2.1	1.7	0
1996	West Coast	20	3	0	2	5	5	10	2	1	0.0	0.7	1.7	1.7	3.3	0.7	0.3	0
1997	Port Adelaide	5	22	7	3	233	176	409	73	29	0.3	0.1	10.6	8.0	18.6	3.3	1.3	7
1998	Port Adelaide	5	15	0	1	142	74	216	63	28	0.0	0.1	9.5	4.9	14.4	4.2	1.9	1
1999	Port Adelaide	5	18	4	2	150	98	248	63	29	0.2	0.1	8.3	5.4	13.8	3.5	1.6	5
2000	Port Adelaide	5	2	0	0	12	6	18	4	1	0.0	0.0	6.0	3.0	9.0	2.0	0.5	0
Career			91	31	29	717	524	1241	270	138	0.3	0.3	7.9	5.8	13.6	3.0	1.5	13
