= Chris Lewis (footballer) =

Australian rules footballer and coach

Personal information
- Full name: Christopher Lockley Lewis
- Born: 17 March 1969 (age 57)
- Original team: Claremont (WAFL)
- Height: 186 cm (6 ft 1 in)
- Weight: 80 kg (176 lb)

Playing career^{1}
| Years | Club | Games (Goals) |
| 1985–1987, 2001 | Claremont | 53 (25) |
| 1987–2000 | West Coast Eagles | 215 (259) |
| Total | | 268 (284) |

Coaching career
| Years | Club | Games (W–L–D) |
| 2007 | Swan Districts (WAFL) | 16 (6–10–0) |
- ^{1} Playing statistics correct to the end of 2000.

Career highlights
- 2× AFL premiership: 1992, 1994; VFL Team of the Year 1987; West Coast Club Champion: 1990; Indigenous Team of the Century; AFL Team of the Year 1990; WAFL premiership: 1996; Ross Glendinning Medal: 1998; WCE 10th Anniversary Team: 1996; WCE 20th Anniversary Team: 2006; WCE 25th Anniversary Team: 2011; WCE Hall of Fame: 2011; WCE Life Member

Christopher Lockley Lewis (born 17 March 1969) is a former Australian rules footballer who played over 200 AFL senior games for the West Coast Eagles.

== Early life ==
An indigenous Australian, Lewis is one of the sons of Irwin Lewis, a notable scholar, sportsman, public servant, and indigenous Australian artist. Like his father and older brothers Clayton and Cameron, he attended Christ Church Grammar School, one of the elite independent schools in Western Australia, for his secondary education, and later played Australian rules football for the Claremont Football Club in the West Australian Football League.

At the time Lewis attended Christ Church, the school apparently did not allow Year 10 students to play in the First XVIII football team (which was reserved for Year 11 and 12 boys, for safety reasons). However, Lewis's ability meant that an exception was made in his case. He was also a very good cricketer whilst at Christ Church.

Lewis first came to prominence during WA’s 1985 Teal Cup win as a member of the so-called “Magnificent Seven” along with future Eagles teammates John Worsfold, Guy McKenna, Peter Sumich, Chris Waterman, Paul Peos and Scott Watters.

== VFL/AFL Career ==
Equal parts tenacious and silky-skilled, Lewis went on to become a member of the inaugural West Coast Eagles side that defeated Richmond in round 1, 1987. In the last game of that season, he kicked a career-high 7 goals against St Kilda.

In 1990, he won the West Coast Eagles Club Champion Award. He was a member of the 1992 and 1994 West Coast premiership teams, as well as the 1996 Claremont premiership team in the WAFL.

As a player, Lewis was considered as highly skilled—his passing skills were amongst the best in the AFL.

After missing the entire 1999 season with a foot injury, Lewis attempted to play on in 2000 but managed just three games before announcing his retirement. He was the final inaugural Eagle to retire from AFL football.

Lewis finished his AFL career as a dual-premiership, 215-game player. Lewis’s career total of 259 goals is ranked 8th in the Eagles’ all-time career goalkicking list as of July 2025.

== Racial abuse ==
The main criticism of Lewis was his frequent suspensions. However, fans and teammates felt that he was given particularly unfair treatment from both umpires and the tribunal. Lewis played much of his early football career prior to the AFL taking action against racial abuse, and thus racial taunts from opposition players were a frequent source of provocation.

Lewis has also been known for many unusual suspensions, including the most infamous case of biting Todd Viney's finger in 1991. It’s now well known that this, amongst most of Lewis’s suspensions, where in the act of defence or retaliation for being directly targeted by opposition teams. At the time of the Viney case, Australian football legend Ron Barassi defended Lewis, saying that he would have done the same thing if another man stuck his fingers in his mouth.

Multiple previous opponents of Lewis, who targeted him with racial slurs and abuse to throw him off his game have since publicly apologised for their actions. Most notably former players Dermott Brereton and Gary Lyon during an episode of The Footy Show in 2011 which Lewis was a guest.

The AFL’s longest-serving coach, Mick Malthouse, once wrote that Lewis was the most talented footballer to come out of Western Australia, and that if he had played under the AFL’s current-day stance against racial vilification and discrimination, he would have been a 300-game-plus player.

Malthouse described the abuse Lewis copped from opposition players as "absolutely disgraceful":

"I don't think eras have anything to do with it. Chris was reported on a couple of occasions. In my mind, I have no doubt he was vilified. We accepted it, and we have got a lot to pay for that, as a nation, as a league and as individuals. Football wore him down. From a young man, when I first went to that football club, who had a beautiful big smile, that became more and more tested through his career."

== Post-AFL Career ==
Lewis coached Swan Districts in 2007 before moving to Port Hedland. He remains involved in football by umpiring the reserves grade in the North Pilbara Football League.

Following his retirement, Lewis has been honoured for his contribution to football by selection in the AFL’s Indigenous Team of the Century in 2005, being named as half-forward flanker in the Eagles' 20th anniversary team in 2006, the 25th anniversary team in 2011, as well as being inducted into the Eagles Hall of Fame in 2011.

Lewis received the Medal of the Order of Australia in the 2026 King's Birthday Honours for "service to Australian rules football, and to the Indigenous community".

== Statistics ==
Legend
| G | Goals | K | Kicks | D | Disposals | T | Tackles |
| B | Behinds | H | Handballs | M | Marks |

| Season | Team | No. | Games | Totals | | | | | | | Averages (per game) | | | | | | | Votes |
| Season | Team | No. | Games | G | B | K | H | D | M | T | G | B | K | H | D | M | T | Votes |
|---|---|---|---|---|---|---|---|---|---|---|---|---|---|---|---|---|---|---|
| 1987 | West Coast | 28 | 19 | 29 | 20 | 227 | 68 | 295 | 91 | 42 | 1.5 | 1.1 | 11.9 | 3.6 | 15.5 | 4.8 | 2.2 | 3 |
| 1988 | West Coast | 28 | 12 | 15 | 15 | 108 | 25 | 133 | 28 | 15 | 1.3 | 1.3 | 9.0 | 2.1 | 11.1 | 2.3 | 1.3 | 0 |
| 1989 | West Coast | 28 | 16 | 18 | 13 | 247 | 83 | 330 | 80 | 35 | 1.1 | 0.8 | 15.4 | 5.2 | 20.6 | 5.0 | 2.2 | 3 |
| 1990 | West Coast | 28 | 22 | 24 | 17 | 346 | 118 | 464 | 68 | 59 | 1.1 | 0.8 | 15.7 | 5.4 | 21.1 | 3.1 | 2.7 | 9 |
| 1991 | West Coast | 28 | 21 | 31 | 19 | 277 | 99 | 376 | 61 | 54 | 1.5 | 0.9 | 13.2 | 4.7 | 17.9 | 2.9 | 2.6 | 3 |
| 1992† | West Coast | 28 | 23 | 17 | 26 | 269 | 93 | 362 | 64 | 53 | 0.7 | 1.1 | 11.7 | 4.0 | 15.7 | 2.8 | 2.3 | 1 |
| 1993 | West Coast | 28 | 15 | 22 | 12 | 183 | 46 | 229 | 51 | 44 | 1.5 | 0.8 | 12.2 | 3.1 | 15.3 | 3.4 | 2.9 | 0 |
| 1994† | West Coast | 28 | 25 | 39 | 37 | 306 | 82 | 388 | 97 | 41 | 1.6 | 1.5 | 12.2 | 3.3 | 15.5 | 3.9 | 1.6 | 1 |
| 1995 | West Coast | 28 | 21 | 20 | 17 | 234 | 87 | 321 | 55 | 55 | 1.0 | 0.8 | 11.1 | 4.1 | 15.3 | 2.6 | 2.6 | 6 |
| 1996 | West Coast | 28 | 8 | 6 | 4 | 52 | 27 | 79 | 25 | 10 | 0.8 | 0.5 | 6.5 | 3.4 | 9.9 | 3.1 | 1.3 | 0 |
| 1997 | West Coast | 28 | 15 | 23 | 13 | 236 | 81 | 317 | 61 | 28 | 1.5 | 0.9 | 15.7 | 5.4 | 21.1 | 4.1 | 1.9 | 7 |
| 1998 | West Coast | 28 | 15 | 14 | 12 | 129 | 43 | 172 | 35 | 18 | 0.9 | 0.8 | 8.6 | 2.9 | 11.5 | 2.3 | 1.2 | 3 |
| 1999 | West Coast | 28 | 0 | — | — | — | — | — | — | — | — | — | — | — | — | — | — | — |
| 2000 | West Coast | 28 | 3 | 1 | 0 | 11 | 13 | 24 | 2 | 7 | 0.3 | 0.0 | 3.7 | 4.3 | 8.0 | 0.7 | 2.3 | 0 |
| Career | | | 215 | 259 | 205 | 2625 | 865 | 3490 | 718 | 461 | 1.2 | 1.0 | 12.2 | 4.0 | 16.2 | 3.3 | 2.1 | 36 |
