= Gus Seebeck =

Australian rules footballer

Personal information
- Full name: Gus Seebeck
- Born: 18 September 1977 (age 49)
- Position: Ruckman / full-forward

Playing career^{1}
Years	Club	Games (Goals)
1996; 1998; 2000	South Fremantle	13 (9)
1999	Perth	20(5)
2001–09	East Coast Eagles	142 (??)

Coaching career
Years	Club	Games (W–L–D)
2002	East Coast Eagles	?? (??)
- ^{1} Playing statistics correct to the end of 2009.

Career highlights
- 1999 Sandover Medal

Gus Seebeck (born 18 September 1977) is a former Australian rules footballer who played for South Fremantle and Perth in the West Australian Football League/Westar Rules (WAFL), and the East Coast Eagles in the AFL Sydney.

== Football career ==
Seebeck was a member of the Victorian Teal Cup winning side in 1994 and played for the Prahran Dragons in the TAC Cup, captaining them in 1995. Of the 25 players in the Victorian side that year, 23 were drafted into the Australian Football League (AFL) in either the 1994 or 1995 AFL draft, but Seebeck was overlooked. He then moved to Perth and played reserves football for South Fremantle whilst he studied Aquaculture at Curtin University. An abundance of tall players limited Seebeck's chance to play in the senior team and despite winning the Prendergast Medal in 1998 as the fairest and best player in the reserves competition, he only managed to play eleven senior games in three years.

In 1999 he moved to play with Perth, as South Fremantle had entered into a host club arrangement with Fremantle and there was likely to be even more competition for positions in the league team. The move was instantly successful, as he was a surprise winner of the 1999 Sandover Medal, beating favourite Ryan Turnbull by one vote. In 2000, however, with the host club arrangement disbanded, he returned to South Fremantle, but only played two games before moving to Sydney for work.

He continued to play football in Sydney for the East Coast Eagles. He was a player coach during the 2002 season. Seebeck was chairman of the club between 2008 and 2014.

== Professional career ==
In 2000, Seebeck joined the PGA Tour as operations manager for Australasia, which was based in Sydney. He had previously worked for the organising committee for the Heineken Classic golf tournament when it was based in Perth. In 2005, Seebeck became general manager of the Australasian PGA Tour.
