= 1994 AFL Grand Final =

Grand final of the 1994 Australian Football League season

| West Coast | Geelong |
|---|---|
| 20.23 (143) | 8.15 (63) |
| | 1 | 2 | 3 | 4 |
|---|---|---|---|---|
| WCE | 4.3 (27) | 8.12 (60) | 12.18 (90) | 20.23 (143) |
| GEE | 4.4 (28) | 5.7 (37) | 7.12 (54) | 8.15 (63) |
- Date: 1 October 1994
- Stadium: Melbourne Cricket Ground
- Attendance: 93,860
- Favourite: West Coast
- Umpires: David Howlett, Denis Rich, Bryan Sheehan

Ceremonies
- Pre-match entertainment: The Seekers and Debra Byrne

Accolades
- Norm Smith Medallist: Dean Kemp (West Coast)
- Jock McHale Medallist: Mick Malthouse

Broadcast in Australia
- Network: Seven Network
- Commentators: Bruce McAvaney (host and commentator); Dennis Cometti (commentator); Gerard Healy (expert commentator); Robert Dipierdomenico (boundary rider); Neil Kerley (boundary rider)

The 1994 AFL Grand Final was an Australian rules football game contested between the Geelong Football Club and West Coast Eagles, held at the Melbourne Cricket Ground in Melbourne on 1 October 1994. It was the 98th annual grand final of the Australian Football League (formerly the Victorian Football League), staged to determine the premiers for the 1994 AFL season. The match, attended by 93,860 spectators, was won by West Coast by a margin of 80 points.

== Background ==
Geelong was looking for its first premiership since winning the 1963 VFL Grand Final and West Coast was attempting to repeat its success in the 1992 AFL Grand Final, when it had defeated Geelong by a margin of 28 points, becoming the first non-Victorian team to win the AFL premiership.

At the conclusion of the home and away season, West Coast had finished first on the AFL ladder with 16 wins and 6 losses, winning the McClelland Trophy. Geelong had finished fourth (behind Carlton and North Melbourne) with 13 wins and 9 losses.

During the lead-up to the game, West Coast were the strong favourites to win. Geelong had won through to the decider after winning three tough finals, including two dramatic after-the-siren wins over Footscray and North Melbourne. West Coast had a relatively smooth run into the grand final, beating Collingwood in a qualifying final to earn a week's rest, before easily accounting for Melbourne in a preliminary final.

== Match summary ==
It was an entertaining first quarter, which saw West Coast stamp its authority early by bursting out of the blocks, before some stirring football by Geelong towards the end of the quarter (including a great long goal from Andrew Wills) saw the Cats lead by a point at quarter time. From then on, though, West Coast started taking control. With Geelong's champion full-forward Gary Ablett well held and star Geelong midfielder Garry Hocking injuring his thigh (yet remaining on the ground), the Cats were in trouble as West Coast began to dominate general play. Billy Brownless took one of the great grand final marks halfway through the 2nd quarter and goaled, but it was the only highlight for the Cats in the term as the Eagles booted 4 of their own to lead by 23 points at half time.

| Team | 1 | 2 | 3 | 4 | Total |
|---|---|---|---|---|---|
| West Coast | 4.3 | 8.12 | 12.18 | 20.23 | 20.23 (143) |
| Geelong | 4.4 | 5.7 | 7.12 | 8.15 | 8.15 (63) |

Even though they led well from quarter time onwards, the Eagles could not convert their dominant play onto the scoreboard, with a constant margin of 4-5 goals seemingly keeping the game in the balance for much of the 3rd quarter. But the last term was all the Eagles, as they stormed home and steamrolled the Cats, kicking 8 final quarter goals to 1, winning the match by 80 points, with 20.23 (143) being the Eagles' highest score of the year.

The Norm Smith Medal was awarded to West Coast's Dean Kemp for being judged the best player afield, with 23 disposals and 2 goals.

It was West Coast's second premiership in three years, and Geelong's third grand final appearance without success in six years.

== Epilogue ==
Cats coach Malcolm Blight quit after the team's third grand final loss in six years. His next two grand finals as a coach came in 1997 and 1998 and both would be premierships with Adelaide against St Kilda and North Melbourne.

West Coast's next success in a grand final came twelve years later, when it won the 2006 AFL Grand Final against the Sydney Swans. It would take until 2007 for Geelong to finally win its first AFL Premiership since 1963, when they defeated Port Adelaide in the 2007 AFL Grand Final.

== Teams ==
| West Coast | Geelong |

West Coast
| B: | 36 David Hart | 14 Michael Brennan | 11 Ashley McIntosh |
| HB: | 17 Guy McKenna | 27 Glen Jakovich | 24 John Worsfold (c) |
| C: | 30 Peter Matera | 10 Don Pyke | 3 Chris Mainwaring |
| HF: | 9 Peter Wilson | 26 Jason Ball | 1 Brett Heady |
| F: | 28 Chris Lewis | 4 Peter Sumich | 20 Shane Bond |
| Foll: | 22 David Hynes | 2 Dean Kemp | 18 Tony Evans |
| Int: | 50 Ryan Turnbull | 6 Drew Banfield | 39 Chris Waterman |
| Coach: | Mick Malthouse | | |

Geelong
| B: | 1 Steven Hocking | 20 Stephen O'Reilly | 14 Steven Handley |
| HB: | 21 Michael Mansfield | 17 Tim McGrath | 29 Ken Hinkley |
| C: | 9 Shayne Breuer | 7 Paul Couch | 15 Peter Riccardi |
| HF: | 31 David Mensch | 16 Billy Brownless | 42 Adrian Hickmott |
| F: | 23 Liam Pickering | 5 Gary Ablett | 11 Leigh Tudor |
| Foll: | 6 John Barnes | 3 Mark Bairstow (c) | 32 Garry Hocking |
| Int: | 4 Andrew Wills | 40 Paul Brown | 2 Leigh Colbert |
| Coach: | Malcolm Blight | | |

== Scorecard ==
1994 AFL Grand Final
Saturday 1 October 1994 2:30pm | West Coast | def. | Geelong | MCG (crowd: 93,860) | Report
4.3 (27); 8.12 (60); 12.18 (90); 20.23 (143) | Q1; Q2; Q3; Final | 4.4 (28); 5.7 (37); 7.12 (54); 8.15 (63) | Umpires: Howlett, Rich, Sheehan; Norm Smith Medal: Dean Kemp; Television broadcast: Channel Seven
Evans 3 Ball, Bond, Heady, Kemp, Chris Lewis, Sumich, Waterman, Wilson 2 Banfield 1 | Goals | 4 Brownless; 1 Ablett, Couch, Riccardi, Wills
Kemp, Jakovich, Pyke, McKenna, Brennan, Evans | Best | Mansfield, O'Reilly, Brownless, Riccardi, Couch, Handley

== See also ==
- 1994 AFL season
