= Dean Kemp =

Australian rules footballer, born 1969

Personal information
- Full name: Dean Phillip Kemp
- Born: 17 February 1969 (age 57); Kalgoorlie, Western Australia
- Original teams: Railways Football Club, Subiaco (WAFL)
- Debut: Round 1, 1990, West Coast vs. Collingwood, at Subiaco
- Height: 182 cm (6 ft 0 in)
- Weight: 81 kg (179 lb)

Playing career^{1}
Years	Club	Games (Goals)
1989-1991	Subiaco	22 (9)
1990–2001	West Coast Eagles	243 (117)
Total		265 (126)
- ^{1} Playing statistics correct to the end of 2001.

Career highlights
- All Australian 1992; Premiership Player 1992, 1994; West Coast Club Champion 1992; Norm Smith Medallist 1994; West Coast co-captain 2001; Australian Football Hall of Fame inductee 2007

Dean Phillip Kemp (born 17 February 1969) is a former Australian rules footballer who played for the West Coast Eagles in the Australian Football League.

Recruited from Subiaco in the Western Australian Football League, Kemp made his AFL debut in Round 1 of the 1990 AFL season in a 46-point win at Subiaco Oval against eventual premiers Collingwood. He played 23 games (including all four finals) and won West Coast's Rookie of the Year Award.

In 1992 he played in West Coast's Premiership team and earned All-Australian selection as well as West Coast's best and fairest award. In 1994 he played in the side's second premiership team and won the Norm Smith Medal for best on ground.

He was selected in the 1996 Team of the Decade and the 2006 Team 20 for the Eagles. In 2001 he was made co-captain with Ben Cousins, but retired later that season. Kemp suffered numerous concussions during his career, including one resulting from a savage hit from Mark Ricciuto, and his career was ultimately shortened somewhat by the effects of these numerous concussions.

Kemp was a midfielder who never polled well in the Brownlow Medal count, polling only 53 career votes, with a season best of 13 in 2000. A reason put forward for this is that Kemp was not a flashy ball carrier type player. Rather, on gaining possession of the ball, would quickly and effectively dispose of it to a teammate.

He was also particularly good playing in the wet, rarely fumbling the greasy ball. He enjoyed a successful career after he was drafted at number 117 in the 1989 draft. The lateness of his selection in the draft is frequently highlighted to argue that late draft picks can still prove themselves to be star players.

Kemp was inducted into the Australian Football Hall of Fame in 2007 and the Western Australian Football Hall of Fame in 2005.

== Statistics ==
Legend
G	Goals	K	Kicks	D	Disposals	T	Tackles
B	Behinds	H	Handballs	M	Marks
#	Played in that season's premiership team

Season	Team	No.	Games	Totals							Averages (per game)							Votes
Season	Team	No.	Games	G	B	K	H	D	M	T	G	B	K	H	D	M	T	Votes
1990	West Coast	33	23	4	4	262	179	441	75	46	0.2	0.2	11.4	7.8	19.2	3.3	2.0	0
1991	West Coast	2	23	12	9	259	170	429	61	46	0.5	0.4	11.3	7.4	18.7	2.7	2.0	3
1992^{#}	West Coast	2	25	14	12	380	163	543	70	74	0.6	0.5	15.2	6.5	21.7	2.8	3.0	7
1993	West Coast	2	17	9	5	248	108	356	56	63	0.5	0.3	14.6	6.4	20.9	3.3	3.7	0
1994^{#}	West Coast	2	22	19	14	304	163	467	80	44	0.9	0.6	13.8	7.4	21.2	3.6	2.0	5
1995	West Coast	2	23	16	10	267	196	463	74	69	0.7	0.4	11.6	8.5	20.1	3.2	3.0	3
1996	West Coast	2	21	12	12	274	168	442	73	70	0.6	0.6	13.0	8.0	21.0	3.5	3.3	8
1997	West Coast	2	22	13	7	296	192	488	69	63	0.6	0.3	13.5	8.7	22.2	3.1	2.9	7
1998	West Coast	2	17	6	6	200	142	342	40	40	0.4	0.4	11.8	8.4	20.1	2.4	2.4	5
1999	West Coast	2	22	6	7	235	120	355	72	50	0.3	0.3	10.7	5.5	16.1	3.3	2.3	2
2000	West Coast	2	20	4	4	297	188	485	78	56	0.2	0.2	14.9	9.4	24.3	3.9	2.8	13
2001	West Coast	2	8	2	1	60	30	90	15	9	0.3	0.1	7.5	3.8	11.3	1.9	1.1	0
Career			243	117	91	3082	1819	4901	763	630	0.5	0.4	12.7	7.5	20.2	3.1	2.6	53

== Honours and achievements ==
Team

- 2× AFL premiership player (West Coast): 1992, 1994
- 2× McClelland Trophy (West Coast): 1991, 1994

Individual

- Norm Smith Medal: 1994
- West Coast Captain: 2001 (co-captain with Ben Cousins)
- West Coast Club Champion: 1992
- All-Australian team: 1992
- 2× State of Origin (Western Australia): 1991, 1992
- Glendinning–Allan Medal: 1997 (Round 18)
- Subiaco Team of the Century (Selected in 2008) – Wing
- Australian Football Hall of Fame - 2007 Inductee
