= Denis Rich =

Australian rules football umpire

Personal information
- Born: 26 October 1954 (age 72)
- Debut: Round 1, 1982, Richmond vs. North Melbourne, at MCG
- Other occupation: Firefighter

Umpiring career
Years	League	Role	Games
1982–1997	Australian Football League (AFL)	field	251

Career highlights
- 3× AFL Grand Final umpire: (1990, 1992, 1994); 3× Bishop Shield: (1989, 1992, 1995); AFL Umpires Association Hall of Fame, inducted 2008

Denis Rich AFSM (born 26 October 1954) is a former Australian rules football field umpire in the Australian Football League (AFL).

Recruited from the West Suburban Football League, Rich made his senior VFL umpiring debut in Round 1 of the 1982 VFL season at the Melbourne Cricket Ground (MCG) in the game between Richmond and North Melbourne. His colleague that day was Ian Robinson. Rich went on to co-officiate in 251 senior VFL/AFL games, including three Grand Finals - in 1990, 1992 and 1994.

Besides umpiring football at the highest level, Rich also served a long career with the Metropolitan Fire Service (MFS). In 2006 it was reported that Rich was going to Antarctica to take up the position of Station Leader at Casey Station.
