= Peter Sumich =

Australian rules footballer

Personal information
- Full name: Peter Lori Sumich
- Nickname: "Suma"
- Born: 11 January 1968 (age 58)
- Original team: Cockburn JFC
- Draft: No. 3, 1988 pre-draft selection
- Height: 190 cm (6 ft 3 in)
- Weight: 96 kg (212 lb)
- Position: Full forward

Playing career^{1}
Years	Club	Games (Goals)
1986–1989, 1998	South Fremantle	112 (178)
1989–1997	West Coast	150 (514)
Total		262 (692)

Representative team honours
Years	Team	Games (Goals)
1988–1993	Western Australia	5 (11)

Coaching career
Years	Club	Games (W–L–D)
2000–2001	South Fremantle	39 (23–16–0)
- ^{1} Playing statistics correct to the end of 1997.

Career highlights
- Western Australia Teal Cup team 1985; South Fremantle leading goalkicker 1988, 1998; West Coast leading goalkicker 1989,1990,1991,1992,1993,1994,1997; West Coast Eagles Rookie of the Year 1989; West Coast premiership player 1992, 1994; South Fremantle premiership player 1997; West Coast life member 1997; South Fremantle co-captain 1998; West Coast Team of the Decade (1996); West Coast Team 20 (2006)

Peter Lori Sumich (born 11 January 1968) is a former Australian rules footballer who represented West Coast in the Australian Football League (AFL) and South Fremantle in the West Australian Football League (WAFL) during the 1980s and 1990s.

Sumich made his debut for South Fremantle in 1986, having also played cricket for the Australian national under-19 team. After leading the club's goalkicking in 1988, Sumich was selected with a pre-draft selection by the West Coast Eagles prior to the 1988 National Draft. He made his debut for West Coast the following season.He established himself as the team's first-choice full-forward, leading the goalkicking for six consecutive seasons between 1989 and 1994. Sumich played in West Coast's 1992 and 1994 premiership sides, before retiring from AFL football at the end of the 1997 season. In 1998, he was co-captain of South Fremantle, and led the club's goalkicking in what was his final year of playing football. During this time, Sumich also represented Western Australia in five State of Origin and interstate matches.

After his retirement from playing, Sumich coached South Fremantle between 2000 and 2001, before signing as an assistant coach at West Coast, where he served in that role from 2002 to 2011, before joining Fremantle as an assistant coach. In total, he kicked 514 goals, a club record, from 150 games for West Coast, leading the club's goalkicking on a record seven occasions. After kicking 111 goals during the 1991 season, Sumich became the first Eagles player, and the first left-footer, to kick more than 100 goals in a season.

== Playing career ==
Originally playing for the Cockburn Junior Football Club, Sumich represented the Western Australia Under-18 team which won the 1985 Teal Cup. He made his debut for South Fremantle in 1986. As well as playing football, Sumich was also a noted under-age cricketer, playing three Tests and three One Day Internationals for the Australia Under-19 cricket team in 1987 as a left-arm orthodox spinner. Sumich also attended the Western Australian Institute of Sport.

Sumich was selected by the West Coast Eagles with a pre-draft selection before the 1988 National Draft. He made his debut for the club in round one of the 1989 VFL season against Essendon, recording 10 disposals. After kicking one goal in the first three games, Sumich was dropped back to South Fremantle, but returned in round seven, and played each of the remaining games for West Coast. He finished with 45 goals for the season to be the club's leading goalkicker, which included four hauls of more than five goals. Against Footscray in round 12 he kicked eight goals, setting a record for the most goals kicked in a match by a West Coast player.

In 1991, Sumich kicked 111 goals to finish second in the Coleman Medal to Tony Lockett, establishing records as the only West Coast Eagles player to kick more than 100 goals in a season and becoming the first left-footer to kick more than 100 goals. His total of 89 behinds for the season is also a VFL/AFL record. Against Footscray in round 13 he kicked 13.3, surpassing his previous record for most goals in a game (later topped by Scott Cummings in 2000 with 14.1). He also kicked five goals in West Coast's Grand Final loss to Hawthorn. Sumich was a member of West Coast's 1992 and 1994 premiership victories over Geelong, kicking six goals in the 1992 Grand Final and two goals in the 1994 Grand Final. In Round 18 of the 1996 AFL season, Sumich kicked six goals in a stirring six-point victory over Essendon, but was reported by umpire Greg Scroop for allegedly striking Damien Hardwick, and was suspended for two matches.

Sumich finished his career in 1997 as West Coast's all-time leading goalkicker, kicking 514 goals from 150 games at an average of 3.43 goals per game. He also holds the record for the most goals kicked at the WACA Ground – 101 goals from 29 games.

Sumich had been playing on-and-off for South Fremantle since he was recruited by West Coast, mainly when recovering from injury or out of form, but returned to the club full-time in 1998, serving as co-captain with Peter Worsfold. He played 17 games for the club in 1998, kicking 25 goals to finish as the club's leading goalkicker, and retired at the end of the season.

== Coaching career ==
Sumich served as coach of South Fremantle in 2000 and 2001, taking his club to a grand final in 2001, which the club lost to East Perth. He accepted a role as an assistant coach at the West Coast Eagles when his premiership teammate John Worsfold was appointed senior coach in 2002. Sumich served in this position for ten years until 2011, which included the club's 2006 premiership victory. The Fremantle Football Club announced in October 2011 that Sumich would be joining the club as an assistant coach under Ross Lyon. He left Fremantle at the end of the 2016 season.

== Playing statistics ==
Legend
G	Goals	K	Kicks	D	Disposals	T	Tackles
B	Behinds	H	Handballs	M	Marks

Season	Team	No.	Games	Totals							Averages (per game)						
Season	Team	No.	Games	G	B	K	H	D	M	T	G	B	K	H	D	M	T
1989	West Coast	4	19	45	28	200	27	227	93	7	2.4	1.5	10.5	1.4	11.9	4.9	0.4
1990	West Coast	4	23	90	61	205	32	237	139	12	3.9	2.7	8.9	1.4	10.3	6.0	0.5
1991	West Coast	4	25	111	89	297	34	331	171	19	4.4	3.6	11.9	1.4	13.2	6.8	0.8
1992†	West Coast	4	19	82	46	162	13	175	87	12	4.3	2.4	8.5	0.7	9.2	4.6	0.6
1993	West Coast	4	21	76	57	174	23	197	100	9	3.6	2.7	8.3	1.1	9.4	4.8	0.4
1994†	West Coast	4	18	49	42	115	7	122	61	12	2.7	2.3	6.4	0.4	6.8	3.4	0.7
1995	West Coast	4	5	7	3	15	2	17	5	7	1.4	0.6	3.0	0.4	3.4	1.0	1.4
1996	West Coast	4	7	21	11	45	5	50	25	7	3.0	1.6	6.4	0.7	7.1	3.6	1.0
1997	West Coast	4	13	33	17	64	13	77	31	7	2.5	1.3	4.9	1.0	5.9	2.4	0.5
Career			150	514	354	1277	156	1433	712	92	3.4	2.4	8.5	1.0	9.6	4.7	0.6
