= Bryan Sheehan (umpire) =

Australian rules football field umpire

Bryan Sheehan is an Australian rules football field umpire in the Australian Football League.

Sheehan umpired 367 games at the AFL/VFL level including 6 Grand Finals. He started umpiring in the VFL in 1986 and after retiring became a Umpires' Assistant Coach. In 2013 he was inducted into the Australian Football Hall of Fame. Sheehan was the first person selected by the AFL as an All-Australian field umpire.
