= 1992 AFL season =

96th season of the Australian Football League (AFL)

1992 AFL premiership season
- Teams: 15
- Premiers: West Coast; 1st premiership
- Minor premiers: Geelong; 11th minor premiership
- Pre-season cup: Hawthorn; 3rd pre-season cup win
- Brownlow Medallist: Scott Wynd (Footscray)
- Leading goalkicker: Jason Dunstall (Hawthorn)

Attendance
- Matches played: 172
- Total attendance: 4,814,265 (27,990 per match)
- Highest: 95,007 (Grand Final, West Coast vs. Geelong)

The 1992 AFL season was the 96th season of the Australian Football League (AFL), the highest level senior Australian rules football competition in Australia, which was known as the Victorian Football League until 1989. The season featured fifteen clubs, ran from 21 March until 26 September, and comprised a 22-game home-and-away season followed by a finals series featuring the top six clubs.

Prior to the season, the AFL ceased its role as the administrative body for football in Victoria after 95 years: this role was transferred, along with control of the reserves competition, to the newly established Victorian State Football League (VSFL). Subsequently, the Victorian AFL clubs' under-19s competition was dissolved, and zone-based recruiting was abolished.

The premiership was won by the West Coast Eagles, after it defeated Geelong by 28 points in the 1992 AFL Grand Final. It was West Coast's first premiership, and the first premiership won by a non-Victorian club following the league's interstate expansion.

== Foster's Cup ==
	Foster's Cup Final
Saturday, 14 March	Fitzroy 8.15 (63)	def. by	Hawthorn 19.14 (128)	Waverley Park (crowd: 49,453)

== Home-and-away season ==
=== Round 1 ===
	Round 1
Saturday, 21 March (2:10 pm)	Hawthorn 21.15 (141)	def.	Geelong 18.13 (121)	Waverley Park (crowd: 34,677)
Saturday, 21 March (7:40 pm)	Brisbane Bears 10.8 (68)	def. by	Carlton 13.14 (94)	Carrara Stadium (crowd: 9,066)
Sunday, 22 March (2:10 pm)	St Kilda 18.20 (128)	def.	Essendon 17.9 (111)	Waverley Park (crowd: 44,520)
Sunday, 22 March (2:10 pm)	Adelaide 12.15 (87)	def. by	Footscray 17.12 (114)	Football Park (crowd: 40,381)
	Bye; Collingwood, Fitzroy, Melbourne, North Melbourne, Richmond, Sydney, West Coast

=== Round 2 ===
	Round 2
Saturday, 28 March (2:10 pm)	Collingwood 23.16 (154)	def.	Brisbane Bears 13.10 (88)	Victoria Park (crowd: 26,166)
Saturday, 28 March (2:10 pm)	Carlton 17.13 (115)	def.	Hawthorn 12.17 (89)	Princes Park (crowd: 25,689)
Saturday, 28 March (2:10 pm)	Melbourne 17.11 (113)	def.	Geelong 15.15 (105)	MCG (crowd: 38,646)
Saturday, 28 March (2:10 pm)	Richmond 9.11 (65)	def. by	North Melbourne 19.17 (131)	Waverley Park (crowd: 21,969)
Sunday, 29 March (2:10 pm)	Essendon 15.8 (98)	def. by	Fitzroy 22.18 (150)	MCG (crowd: 29,206)
Sunday, 29 March (2:10 pm)	Footscray 16.12 (108)	def.	St Kilda 9.22 (76)	Western Oval (crowd: 25,072)
Sunday, 29 March (2:10 pm)	Sydney 14.14 (98)	def.	West Coast 14.11 (95)	SCG (crowd: 9,325)
	Bye; Adelaide

=== Round 3 ===
	Round 3
Saturday, 4 April (2:10 pm)	Melbourne 13.17 (95)	def. by	Adelaide 15.14 (104)	Princes Park (crowd: 9,278)
Saturday, 4 April (2:10 pm)	Collingwood 17.14 (116)	def.	Sydney 13.19 (97)	Victoria Park (crowd: 25,432)
Saturday, 4 April (2:10 pm)	North Melbourne 10.15 (75)	def. by	Hawthorn 14.17 (101)	MCG (crowd: 25,323)
Sunday, 5 April (2:10 pm)	Brisbane Bears 11.16 (82)	def.	Fitzroy 8.10 (58)	Carrara Oval (crowd: 3,876)
Sunday, 5 April (2:10 pm)	Footscray 9.15 (69)	def. by	Essendon 13.13 (91)	Western Oval (crowd: 21,569)
Sunday, 5 April (2:10 pm)	Geelong 29.24 (198)	def.	Richmond 11.6 (72)	Kardinia Park (crowd: 22,122)
Sunday, 5 April (2:10 pm)	West Coast 16.17 (113)	def.	St Kilda 12.8 (80)	Subiaco Oval (crowd: 30,428)
	Bye; Carlton

=== Round 4 ===
	Round 4
Friday, 10 April (7:40 pm)	North Melbourne 16.14 (110)	def. by	Carlton 19.11 (125)	MCG (crowd: 43,231)
Saturday, 11 April (2:10 pm)	Fitzroy 19.16 (130)	def.	Adelaide 14.13 (97)	Princes Park (crowd: 8,243)
Saturday, 11 April (2:10 pm)	Essendon 17.13 (115)	def. by	Collingwood 19.10 (124)	Waverley Park (crowd: 54,984)
Saturday, 11 April (2:10 pm)	St Kilda 16.12 (108)	def.	Hawthorn 14.14 (98)	Moorabbin Oval (crowd: 27,350)
Saturday, 11 April (2:10 pm)	Richmond 17.17 (119)	def.	Melbourne 9.15 (69)	MCG (crowd: 27,572)
Sunday, 12 April (2:10 pm)	Sydney 17.17 (119)	def. by	Footscray 25.15 (165)	SCG (crowd: 8,309)
Sunday, 12 April (2:10 pm)	West Coast 15.17 (107)	def. by	Geelong 20.11 (131)	Subiaco Oval (crowd: 32,101)
	Bye; Brisbane Bears

=== Round 5 ===
	Round 5
Saturday, 18 April (2:10 pm)	Carlton 10.13 (73)	def. by	Sydney 14.10 (94)	Princes Park (crowd: 21,182)
Saturday, 18 April (2:10 pm)	Hawthorn 16.18 (114)	def. by	Essendon 22.9 (141)	Waverley Park (crowd: 32,509)
Saturday, 18 April (2:10 pm)	North Melbourne 14.17 (101)	def. by	Footscray 20.20 (140)	MCG (crowd: 22,562)
Saturday, 18 April (7:40 pm)	Brisbane Bears 14.8 (92)	drew with	West Coast 13.14 (92)	Carrara Stadium (crowd: 6,923)
Sunday, 19 April (2:10 pm)	Adelaide 23.13 (151)	def.	Richmond 17.15 (117)	Football Park (crowd: 39,022)
Monday, 20 April (2:10 pm)	Melbourne 14.14 (98)	def. by	Collingwood 19.17 (131)	MCG (crowd: 63,711)
Monday, 20 April (2:10 pm)	Fitzroy 16.12 (108)	def. by	St Kilda 17.26 (128)	Princes Park (crowd: 20,298)
	Bye; Geelong

=== Round 6 ===
	Round 6
Friday, 24 April (7:40 pm)	Sydney 11.10 (76)	def. by	North Melbourne 18.17 (125)	SCG (crowd: 9,226)
Saturday, 25 April (2:10 pm)	Carlton 18.13 (121)	def.	St Kilda 17.11 (113)	Princes Park (crowd: 34,661)
Saturday, 25 April (2:10 pm)	Collingwood 17.9 (111)	def. by	Hawthorn 20.15 (135)	Waverley Park (crowd: 72,765)
Saturday, 25 April (2:10 pm)	Essendon 18.16 (124)	def.	Melbourne 19.9 (123)	MCG (crowd: 41,405)
Sunday, 26 April (2:10 pm)	Adelaide 19.20 (134)	def.	Brisbane Bears 11.8 (74)	Football Park (crowd: 42,759)
Sunday, 26 April (2:10 pm)	Geelong 25.25 (175)	def.	Fitzroy 11.11 (77)	Kardinia Park (crowd: 22,062)
Sunday, 26 April (2:10 pm)	Richmond 14.12 (96)	def. by	West Coast 14.13 (97)	MCG (crowd: 17,629)
	Bye; Footscray
Essendon trailed Melbourne by 41 points at three-quarter time, and by 47 points after five minutes of the final quarter, before kicking the last eight goals of the match to win by one point.

=== Round 7 ===
	Round 7
Saturday, 2 May (2:10 pm)	St Kilda 21.13 (139)	def.	Adelaide 9.11 (65)	Moorabbin Oval (crowd: 22,350)
Saturday, 2 May (2:10 pm)	Collingwood 16.20 (116)	def.	North Melbourne 9.12 (66)	Victoria Park (crowd: 27,262)
Saturday, 2 May (2:10 pm)	Hawthorn 25.22 (172)	def.	Richmond 14.9 (93)	Waverley Park (crowd: 26,789)
Saturday, 2 May (2:10 pm)	Melbourne 13.18 (96)	drew with	Sydney 13.18 (96)	MCG (crowd: 17,532)
Sunday, 3 May (3:10 pm)	Brisbane Bears 11.9 (75)	def. by	Geelong 37.17 (239)	Carrara Oval (crowd: 7,645)
Sunday, 3 May (2:10 pm)	Footscray 18.20 (128)	def.	Carlton 11.6 (72)	MCG (crowd: 49,406)
Sunday, 3 May (2:10 pm)	Fitzroy 15.12 (102)	def.	West Coast 11.16 (82)	North Hobart Oval (crowd: 8,819)
	Bye; Essendon
Jason Dunstall (Hawthorn) kicked 17 goals and 5 behinds against Richmond. It was the most goals by a player in a match since Fred Fanning kicked a record 18 goals in 1947.; Geelong's score of 37.17 (239) against Brisbane Bears broke the record held by Fitzroy since 1979 for the highest score in VFL/AFL history.

=== Round 8 ===
	Round 8
Thursday, 7 May (7:40 pm)	Collingwood 9.18 (72)	def. by	Carlton 16.9 (105)	MCG (crowd: 83,262)
Friday, 8 May (7:40 pm)	Sydney 19.21 (135)	def.	Brisbane Bears 8.13 (61)	SCG (crowd: 7,425)
Saturday, 9 May (2:10 pm)	Geelong 32.18 (210)	def.	Adelaide 12.15 (87)	Kardinia Park (crowd: 18,565)
Saturday, 9 May (2:10 pm)	North Melbourne 19.18 (132)	def.	Essendon 11.14 (80)	Princes Park (crowd: 15,911)
Saturday, 9 May (2:10 pm)	Richmond 15.12 (102)	def. by	Fitzroy 24.17 (161)	MCG (crowd: 20,101)
Saturday, 9 May (2:10 pm)	St Kilda 18.17 (125)	def.	Melbourne 10.5 (65)	Waverley Park (crowd: 31,556)
Sunday, 10 May (2:10 pm)	West Coast 19.19 (133)	def.	Footscray 11.8 (74)	Subiaco Oval (crowd: 25,234)
	Bye; Hawthorn
The Thursday night match between Collingwood and Carlton formed part of the Collingwood Football Club's centenary celebrations. It was scheduled to be played on the 100th anniversary of Collingwood's inaugural senior game, which was played against Carlton on Saturday 7 May 1892.

=== Round 9 ===
Home team	Home team score	Away team	Away team score	Ground	Crowd	Date
North Melbourne	9.12 (66)	Fitzroy	15.15 (105)	MCG	17,371	Friday 15, May
Carlton	11.16 (82)	West Coast	15.16 (106)	Princes Park	19,077	Saturday 16, May
Essendon	17.22 (124)	Geelong	28.13 (181)	MCG	41,244	Saturday 16, May
Hawthorn	18.12 (120)	Melbourne	7.6 (48)	Waverley Park	22,686	Saturday 16, May
Brisbane Bears	6.6 (42)	Footscray	11.18 (84)	Carrara Stadium	3,059	Sunday 17, May
Richmond	19.20 (134)	Sydney	14.18 (102)	MCG	17,487	Sunday 17, May
Adelaide	9.10 (64)	Collingwood	9.15 (69)	Football Park	44,723	Sunday 17, May

=== Round 10 ===
Home team	Home team score	Away team	Away team score	Ground	Crowd	Date
West Coast	17.16 (118)	Adelaide	11.12 (78)	WACA	23,046	Friday 22, May
Carlton	18.8 (116)	Essendon	7.22 (64)	Princes Park	27,993	Saturday 23, May
Geelong	9.12 (66)	Collingwood	12.9 (81)	Waverley Park	60,228	Saturday 23, May
Footscray	16.11 (107)	Richmond	13.12 (90)	Whitten Oval	18,508	Saturday 23, May
Melbourne	21.14 (140)	North Melbourne	16.8 (104)	MCG	18,634	Saturday 23, May
St Kilda	25.18 (168)	Brisbane Bears	9.6 (60)	Moorabbin Oval	18,360	Saturday 23, May
Sydney	12.13 (85)	Hawthorn	21.20 (146)	SCG	12,217	Sunday 24, May

=== Round 11 ===
Home team	Home team score	Away team	Away team score	Ground	Crowd	Date
Melbourne	10.5 (65)	Carlton	14.15 (99)	Waverley Park	30,177	Saturday 30, May
Fitzroy	13.14 (92)	Collingwood	13.11 (89)	Princes Park	25,343	Saturday 30, May
Geelong	19.15 (129)	St Kilda	18.18 (126)	Kardinia Park	22,429	Saturday 30, May
Richmond	22.10 (142)	Brisbane Bears	11.17 (83)	MCG	13,174	Saturday 30, May
Essendon	16.20 (116)	Sydney	10.13 (73)	MCG	20,476	Sunday 31, May
Footscray	16.13 (109)	Hawthorn	11.9 (75)	Whitten Oval	25,829	Sunday 31, May
Adelaide	21.16 (142)	North Melbourne	16.11 (107)	Football Park	36,312	Sunday 31, May

=== Round 12 ===
	Round 12
Friday, 5 June (7:40 pm)	North Melbourne 10.6 (66)	def. by	West Coast 14.26 (110)	MCG (crowd: 10,165)
Saturday, 6 June (2:10 pm)	Essendon 19.16 (130)	def.	Richmond 11.13 (79)	MCG (crowd: 35,967)
Saturday, 6 June (2:10 pm)	Fitzroy 11.18 (84)	def. by	Footscray 22.14 (146)	Princes Park (crowd: 20,020)
Sunday, 7 June (2:10 pm)	Brisbane Bears 16.7 (103)	def.	Melbourne 11.11 (77)	Carrara Oval (crowd: 4,902)
Sunday, 7 June (2:10 pm)	Carlton 13.12 (90)	def. by	Geelong 16.22 (118)	MCG (crowd: 62,586)
Monday, 8 June (2:10 pm)	Hawthorn 15.12 (102)	def. by	Adelaide 15.13 (103)	Waverley Park (crowd: 21,119)
Monday, 8 June (2:10 pm)	Collingwood 11.10 (76)	def. by	St Kilda 10.17 (77)	MCG (crowd: 80,060)
	Bye; Sydney
St Kilda defeated Collingwood by one point in front of just over 80,000 spectators at the Melbourne Cricket Ground on the Queen's Birthday holiday. The game was marred by a half-time brawl involving both teams as well as angry spectators who were locked out before the game, some of whom climbed over a fence and forced their way in.

=== Round 13 ===
	Round 13
Saturday, 13 June (2:10 pm)	Carlton 17.13 (115)	def.	Adelaide 13.14 (92)	Princes Park (crowd: 14,433)
Saturday, 13 June (2:10 pm)	Hawthorn 22.13 (145)	def.	Fitzroy 13.11 (89)	Waverley Park (crowd: 22,289)
Saturday, 13 June (2:10 pm)	North Melbourne 17.13 (115)	def. by	Geelong 29.18 (192)	MCG (crowd: 22,156)
Saturday, 13 June (2:10 pm)	St Kilda 24.13 (157)	def.	Sydney 15.14 (104)	Moorabbin Oval (crowd: 19,716)
Sunday, 14 June (2:10 pm)	Brisbane Bears 12.13 (85)	def. by	Essendon 18.11 (119)	Carrara Oval (crowd: 6,442)
Sunday, 14 June (2:10 pm)	West Coast 8.14 (62)	def. by	Collingwood 8.15 (63)	Subiaco Oval (crowd: 32,622)
Sunday, 14 June (2:10 pm)	Footscray 25.11 (161)	def.	Melbourne 8.6 (54)	Western Oval (crowd: 19,185)
	Bye; Richmond
Tony Lockett (St Kilda) kicked 15 goals and 4 behinds against Sydney.

=== Round 14 ===
Home team	Home team score	Away team	Away team score	Ground	Crowd	Date
North Melbourne	20.17 (137)	Brisbane Bears	16.6 (102)	MCG	6,396	Friday 19, June
Fitzroy	20.13 (133)	Carlton	17.12 (114)	Princes Park	21,405	Saturday 20, June
Hawthorn	8.12 (60)	West Coast	11.8 (74)	Waverley Park	26,346	Saturday 20, June
Richmond	15.18 (108)	St Kilda	24.13 (157)	MCG	30,922	Saturday 20, June
Collingwood	11.16 (82)	Footscray	11.10 (76)	MCG	67,835	Sunday 21, June
Sydney	11.17 (83)	Geelong	24.14 (158)	SCG	11,132	Sunday 21, June
Adelaide	14.8 (92)	Essendon	21.10 (136)	Football Park	43,163	Sunday 21, June

=== Round 15 ===
	Round 15
Friday, 26 June (7:40 pm)	Adelaide 22.17 (149)	def.	Sydney 13.4 (82)	Football Park (crowd: 31,593)
Saturday, 27 June (2:10 pm)	Richmond 19.9 (123)	def.	Carlton 17.18 (120)	Waverley Park (crowd: 24,072)
Saturday, 27 June (2:10 pm)	Essendon 9.8 (62)	def. by	West Coast 20.17 (137)	MCG (crowd: 32,849)
Saturday, 27 June (2:10 pm)	St Kilda 18.9 (117)	def.	North Melbourne 16.13 (109)	Moorabbin Oval (crowd: 22,329)
Sunday, 28 June (2:10 pm)	Brisbane Bears 15.14 (104)	def. by	Hawthorn 16.12 (108)	Carrara Oval (crowd: 7,573)
Sunday, 28 June (2:10 pm)	Melbourne 16.13 (109)	def.	Fitzroy 13.9 (87)	MCG (crowd: 21,097)
Sunday, 28 June (2:10 pm)	Geelong 14.18 (102)	def.	Footscray 14.9 (93)	Kardinia Park (crowd: 27,445)
	Bye; Collingwood
Peter Sumich (West Coast) kicked 11 goals and 8 behinds against Essendon.

=== Round 16 ===
Home team	Home team score	Away team	Away team score	Ground	Crowd	Date
West Coast	15.19 (109)	Melbourne	13.9 (87)	WACA	23,182	Friday 3, July
Carlton	27.17 (179)	Brisbane Bears	12.8 (80)	Princes Park	11,693	Saturday 4, July
Collingwood	24.17 (161)	Richmond	14.14 (98)	Victoria Park	31,168	Saturday 4, July
Essendon	16.15 (111)	St Kilda	11.17 (83)	MCG	42,461	Saturday 4, July
Footscray	22.11 (143)	Adelaide	8.8 (56)	Waverley Park	13,235	Saturday 4, July
Geelong	14.11 (95)	Hawthorn	16.18 (114)	Kardinia Park	26,257	Saturday 4, July
Sydney	11.17 (83)	Fitzroy	21.10 (136)	SCG	7,329	Sunday 5, July

=== Round 17 ===
Home team	Home team score	Away team	Away team score	Ground	Crowd	Date
Hawthorn	7.12 (54)	Carlton	9.12 (66)	Waverley Park	52,481	Saturday 11, July
St Kilda	11.18 (84)	Footscray	15.7 (97)	Moorabbin Oval	27,347	Saturday 11, July
Geelong	21.10 (136)	Melbourne	8.15 (63)	Kardinia Park	19,829	Saturday 11, July
North Melbourne	18.11 (119)	Richmond	17.16 (118)	Princes Park	11,089	Saturday 11, July
Brisbane Bears	9.10 (64)	Collingwood	14.19 (103)	Carrara Stadium	13,053	Saturday 11, July
Fitzroy	10.17 (77)	Essendon	11.14 (80)	North Hobart Oval	10,265	Sunday 12, July
West Coast	16.11 (107)	Sydney	8.6 (54)	Subiaco Oval	28,397	Sunday 12, July

=== Round 18 ===
Home team	Home team score	Away team	Away team score	Ground	Crowd	Date
Sydney	14.12 (96)	Collingwood	17.12 (114)	SCG	15,240	Friday 17, July
Essendon	13.15 (93)	Footscray	10.17 (77)	MCG	44,142	Saturday 18, July
Fitzroy	10.13 (73)	Brisbane Bears	16.18 (114)	Princes Park	6,461	Saturday 18, July
Hawthorn	20.13 (133)	North Melbourne	14.12 (96)	Waverley Park	17,096	Saturday 18, July
Richmond	12.11 (83)	Geelong	24.21 (165)	MCG	26,131	Sunday 19, July
Adelaide	9.13 (67)	Melbourne	18.8 (116)	Football Park	31,963	Sunday 19, July
St Kilda	15.5 (95)	West Coast	3.11 (29)	Waverley Park	24,691	Sunday 19, July

=== Round 19 ===
Home team	Home team score	Away team	Away team score	Ground	Crowd	Date
Collingwood	10.23 (83)	Essendon	8.13 (61)	MCG	88,066	Friday 24, July
Carlton	15.18 (108)	North Melbourne	15.11 (101)	Princes Park	17,079	Saturday 25, July
Footscray	15.13 (103)	Sydney	8.9 (57)	Whitten Oval	12,742	Saturday 25, July
Geelong	12.5 (77)	West Coast	15.6 (96)	Kardinia Park	25,585	Saturday 25, July
Hawthorn	7.13 (55)	St Kilda	19.16 (130)	Waverley Park	43,132	Saturday 25, July
Melbourne	23.12 (150)	Richmond	10.15 (75)	MCG	20,184	Saturday 25, July
Adelaide	21.6 (132)	Fitzroy	7.5 (47)	Football Park	25,597	Saturday 25, July

=== Round 20 ===
	Round 20
Friday, 31 July (7:40 pm)	West Coast 29.12 (186)	def.	Brisbane Bears 8.7 (55)	WACA Ground (crowd: 23,236)
Saturday, 1 August (2:10 pm)	Collingwood 14.16 (100)	def. by	Melbourne 16.13 (109)	Victoria Park (crowd: 25,536)
Saturday, 1 August (2:10 pm)	Essendon 8.8 (56)	def. by	Hawthorn 32.24 (216)	MCG (crowd: 41,070)
Saturday, 1 August (2:10 pm)	St Kilda 14.18 (102)	def.	Fitzroy 10.24 (84)	Moorabbin Oval (crowd: 27,736)
Saturday, 1 August (2:10 pm)	Footscray 24.8 (152)	def.	North Melbourne 16.9 (105)	Waverley Park (crowd: 13,373)
Sunday, 2 August (2:10 pm)	Richmond 7.11 (53)	def. by	Adelaide 24.19 (163)	MCG (crowd: 10,291)
Sunday, 2 August (2:10 pm)	Sydney 20.10 (130)	def. by	Carlton 21.13 (139)	SCG (crowd: 13,265)
	Bye; Geelong
Jason Dunstall (Hawthorn) kicked 12 goals and 8 behinds against Essendon.; The match between St Kilda and Fitzroy was the last VFL/AFL game played at Moorabbin Oval; St Kilda moved its home ground to Waverley Park in 1993.

=== Round 21 ===
Home team	Home team score	Away team	Away team score	Ground	Crowd	Date
North Melbourne	15.21 (111)	Sydney	11.14 (80)	MCG	9,739	Friday 7, August
Hawthorn	11.16 (82)	Collingwood	8.15 (63)	Waverley Park	53,369	Saturday 8, August
Melbourne	13.16 (94)	Essendon	19.12 (126)	MCG	25,508	Saturday 8, August
Fitzroy	10.8 (68)	Geelong	17.18 (120)	Princes Park	11,871	Saturday 8, August
St Kilda	12.15 (87)	Carlton	18.14 (122)	Waverley Park	50,883	Sunday 9, August
West Coast	15.14 (104)	Richmond	12.12 (84)	Subiaco Oval	23,245	Sunday 9, August
Brisbane Bears	11.11 (77)	Adelaide	17.8 (110)	Carrara Stadium	4,603	Sunday 9, August

=== Round 22 ===
Home team	Home team score	Away team	Away team score	Ground	Crowd	Date
West Coast	14.22 (106)	Fitzroy	10.16 (76)	WACA	23,016	Friday 14, August
Carlton	19.22 (136)	Footscray	7.12 (54)	Princes Park	31,375	Saturday 15, August
Geelong	23.13 (151)	Brisbane Bears	9.4 (58)	Kardinia Park	17,187	Saturday 15, August
Richmond	13.8 (86)	Hawthorn	25.20 (170)	MCG	20,423	Saturday 15, August
North Melbourne	14.8 (92)	Collingwood	14.14 (98)	MCG	35,253	Sunday 16, August
Sydney	13.10 (88)	Melbourne	21.13 (139)	SCG	8,656	Sunday 16, August
Adelaide	13.15 (93)	St Kilda	10.17 (77)	Football Park	38,675	Sunday 16, August

=== Round 23 ===
Home team	Home team score	Away team	Away team score	Ground	Crowd	Date
Carlton	12.14 (86)	Collingwood	15.12 (102)	Waverley Park	77,357	Saturday 22, August
Essendon	20.19 (139)	North Melbourne	10.11 (71)	MCG	21,044	Saturday 22, August
Fitzroy	20.13 (133)	Richmond	14.14 (98)	Princes Park	9,244	Saturday 22, August
Brisbane Bears	19.15 (129)	Sydney	9.16 (70)	Carrara Stadium	4,349	Saturday 22, August
Footscray	7.11 (53)	West Coast	3.5 (23)	Whitten Oval	15,695	Sunday 23, August
Adelaide	24.25 (169)	Geelong	11.12 (78)	Football Park	46,543	Sunday 23, August
Melbourne	6.7 (43)	St Kilda	8.10 (58)	MCG	30,548	Sunday 23, August

=== Round 24 ===
Home team	Home team score	Away team	Away team score	Ground	Crowd	Date
Sydney	13.17 (95)	Richmond	18.17 (125)	SCG	7,466	Friday 28, August
Collingwood	13.9 (87)	Adelaide	11.16 (82)	Victoria Park	28,990	Saturday 29, August
Geelong	16.14 (110)	Essendon	9.10 (64)	Waverley Park	42,968	Saturday 29, August
Fitzroy	14.12 (96)	North Melbourne	19.16 (130)	Princes Park	8,830	Saturday 29, August
Footscray	19.17 (131)	Brisbane Bears	11.8 (74)	Whitten Oval	15,390	Saturday 29, August
Melbourne	20.10 (130)	Hawthorn	22.17 (149)	MCG	42,549	Saturday 29, August
West Coast	18.12 (120)	Carlton	12.15 (87)	Subiaco Oval	40,441	Sunday 30, August

== Ladder ==
(P)	Premiers
	Qualified for finals

#	Team	P	W	L	D	PF	PA	%	Pts
1	Geelong	22	16	6	0	3057	2099	145.6	64
2	Footscray	22	16	6	0	2384	1836	129.8	64
3	Collingwood	22	16	6	0	2195	1911	114.9	64
4	West Coast (P)	22	15	6	1	2206	1752	125.9	62
5	Hawthorn	22	14	8	0	2579	2098	122.9	56
6	St Kilda	22	14	8	0	2415	2009	120.2	56
7	Carlton	22	14	8	0	2362	2103	112.3	56
8	Essendon	22	12	10	0	2241	2414	92.8	48
9	Adelaide	22	11	11	0	2317	2286	101.4	44
10	Fitzroy	22	9	13	0	2166	2398	90.3	36
11	Melbourne	22	7	14	1	2083	2386	87.3	30
12	North Melbourne	22	7	15	0	2269	2535	89.5	28
13	Richmond	22	5	17	0	2160	2938	73.5	20
14	Brisbane Bears	22	4	17	1	1770	2742	64.6	18
15	Sydney	22	3	18	1	1997	2694	74.1	14

Rules for classification: 1. premiership points; 2. percentage; 3. points for
Average score: 103.6
Source: AFL Tables

== Finals series ==
The AFL used a modified version of the McIntyre final six, after criticism of the original final six system. The difference to the original version was that First Semi-final would be contested between the loser of the qualifying final and the Elimination Final winner which had finished in a lower qualifying position on the ladder, while the second Semi-final would be contested between the winner of the qualifying final and the Elimination Final winner which had finished in a higher qualifying position on the ladder. This system would be retained for the following season before being replaced by the McIntyre final eight system.

=== Elimination Finals ===
First Elimination Final
Sunday, 6 September 2:30pm	West Coast	def.	Hawthorn	Subiaco Oval (crowd: 40,237)
1.3 (9); 6.5 (41); 10.10 (70); 14.16 (100)	Q1; Q2; Q3; Final	4.6 (30); 6.8 (44); 10.13 (73); 12.15 (87)	Umpires: C. Mitchell, Rich; Television broadcast: Seven Network
Sumich 4 Matera 3 Pyke, Langdon 2 Heady, Kemp, Lewis 1	Goals	6 Dunstall; 2 Hudson; 1 Anderson, Jarman, Gowers, Platten
Matera, Pyke, Harding, Kemp, McKenna, Waterman, Langdon	Best	Gowers, Allan, Taylor, Platten, Dunstall

Second Elimination Final
Saturday, 5 September 2:30pm	Collingwood	def. by	St Kilda	Waverley Park (crowd: 74,253)
2.3 (15); 5.4 (34); 8.8 (56); 12.11 (83)	Q1; Q2; Q3; Final	2.4 (16); 6.7 (43); 10.9 (69); 13.13 (91)	Umpires: Carey, Sheehan; Television broadcast: Seven Network
McKeown 5 Russell, Rowe 2 Francis, Brown, Starcevich 1	Goals	5 Lockett; 2 Dwyer, Loewe; 1 Devonport, Morris, Fletcher, Kickett
Monkhorst, Wright, Russell, McKeown, Pert, Shaw	Best	Harvey, Loewe, Ralphsmith, Dwyer, Devonport, Lockett

=== Qualifying final ===
Qualifying Final
Sunday, 6 September 2:30pm	Geelong	def.	Footscray	MCG (crowd: 68,753)
5.4 (34); 11.6 (72); 18.9 (117); 26.16 (172)	Q1; Q2; Q3; Final	7.2 (44); 14.4 (88); 15.7 (97); 17.9 (111)	Umpires: Goldspink, Kennedy; Television broadcast: Seven Network
Brownless 9 Ablett 5 Hocking 3 Scott, Mansfield, Barnes 2 Couch, Stoneham, Bews 1	Goals	8 Del-Re; 2 Hawkins, Royal; 1 Charles, Kellett, MacPherson, Grant, Atkins
Couch, Brownless, Ablett, Scott, Mansfield, Bews, Simpson, Hocking	Best	Del-Re, Baxter, Liberatore, Kellett, Hawkins, Charles

=== Semi-finals ===
Home team	Score	Away team	Score	Venue	Attendance	Date
Footscray	19.5 (119)	St Kilda	14.6 (90)	Waverley Park	59,512	Saturday, 12 September
Geelong	14.11 (95)	West Coast	20.13 (133)	MCG	71,745	Sunday, 13 September

=== Preliminary final ===
Home team	Score	Away team	Score	Venue	Attendance	Date
Geelong	22.17 (149)	Footscray	12.13 (85)	MCG	71,841	Saturday, 19 September

=== Grand Final ===
Home team	Score	Away team	Score	Venue	Attendance	Date
West Coast	16.17 (113)	Geelong	12.13 (85)	MCG	95,007	Saturday, 26 September

== Awards ==
- The Brownlow Medal was awarded to Scott Wynd of Footscray.
- The Leigh Matthews Trophy was awarded to Jason Dunstall of Hawthorn.
- The Coleman Medal was awarded to Jason Dunstall of Hawthorn.
- The Norm Smith Medal was awarded to Peter Matera of West Coast.
- The Wooden Spoon was "awarded" to Sydney.

== Notable events ==
- The minor grades and recruitment processes for Victorian clubs in the AFL competition underwent significant changes for the 1992 season:
  - Zone-based recruiting was abolished, firmly establishing the AFL draft as the primary mechanism for player recruitment.
  - The AFL ceased its role as the administrative body for football in Victoria after 95 years, with the Victorian State Football League (VSFL) being established as a new administrative body to oversee football in Victoria.
  - The VSFL also took control of the AFL reserves competition: this change was only administrative, with the VSFL serving as a continuation of the AFL reserves (main: 1992 AFL reserves season).
  - The AFL Under-19s competition and the twelve competing AFL clubs under-19s teams were dissolved, being replaced by the VSFL's new Under-18s competition (later known as the TAC Cup and currently as the Coates Talent League) that featured six district-based clubs not affiliated with any AFL club.
- The 1992 preseason saw Nigel Smart get his feet burned in an infamous firewalking incident (that he had suggested in the first place). Smart was nicknamed "Not So" after the incident.
- Geelong also set records for most points scored in a home-and-away season (3,057) and in all games (3,558), which have not been broken as of 2024. The Cats managed to score over 175 points in six different games.
- The round 9 match between the Brisbane Bears and Footscray on a rainy Sunday at Carrara saw only 3,059 attend. As of 2024, this is the lowest attendance at an VFL/AFL match not subject to crowd restrictions since the war-affected 1942 season. (Note: This excludes 2020 and 2021, when the COVID-19 pandemic severely limited attendance or saw matches played behind closed doors.)
- In Round 23, in torrential rain at the Western Oval, West Coast kicked only 0.2 (2) to three-quarter time. This is the lowest three-quarter time score since 1953.
- The first McIntyre "final six" system, which had operated in 1991, was replaced by the second McIntyre "final six" system. The second McIntyre "final six" system lasted two seasons; it was replaced by the McIntyre "final eight" system in 1994.
- The Round 20 match between St. Kilda and Fitzroy was the last senior AFL game to be played at Moorabbin Oval, which had been home to the Saints for twenty-eight seasons beginning in 1965. St. Kilda would play their home games at Waverley Park for the remainder of the 1990s before permanently moving to Docklands Stadium in 2000. St. Kilda's AFLW team has played its home games at Moorabbin since its 2019 formation.

== See also ==
- second McIntyre "final six" system

== Bibliography ==
- Lovett, Michael, ed. (2012). AFL Record Season Guide 2012: The Official Statistical History of the AFL. Docklands: Australian Football League. ISSN 1839-8383.

== Sources ==
- 1992 AFL season at AFL Tables
- 1992 AFL season at Australian Football
