= 1994 AFL season =

98th season of the Australian Football League (AFL)

1994 AFL premiership season
- Teams: 15
- Premiers: West Coast; 2nd premiership
- Minor premiers: West Coast; 2nd minor premiership
- Pre-season cup: Essendon; 3rd pre-season cup win
- Brownlow Medallist: Greg Williams (Carlton)
- Leading goalkicker: Gary Ablett (Geelong)

Attendance
- Matches played: 174
- Total attendance: 5,237,398 (30,100 per match)
- Highest: 93,860 (Grand Final, West Coast vs. Geelong)

The 1994 AFL season was the 98th season of the Australian Football League (AFL), the highest level senior Australian rules football competition in Australia, which was known as the Victorian Football League until 1989. The season featured fifteen clubs, ran from 26 March until 1 October, and comprised a 22-game home-and-away season followed by a finals series featuring the top eight clubs – an increase from the six clubs which had contested the finals in previous years.

The premiership was won by the West Coast Eagles for the second time, after it defeated Geelong by 80 points in the 1994 AFL Grand Final.

== Foster's Cup ==
Essendon 15.12 (102) defeated Adelaide 9.14 (68) in the final.

== Rule changes ==
There were several significant alterations to the laws of the game brought in for the 1994 season:

- The number of interchange players was increased from two to three which, when added to the "run on" team of 18 on-the-field players, increased the standard team squad size to 21 players.
- The number of field umpires was increased from two to three.
- Playing time was reduced from 25 minutes per quarter to 20 minutes, but additional stoppages (including all scores and boundary throw-ins) attracted "time-on" allocations; the total reduction of playing time was approximately 10%.
- The size of each club's senior playing list was significantly reduced from 52 to 42 players from the 1994 season (with the exception of the struggling Sydney, which was granted a list of 50 players). Victorian clubs could list ten players on a supplementary list to make up the numbers for their reserves teams, but these players were ineligible for AFL senior selection. The change was part of an AFL Commission plan to shut down the AFL reserves competition by 1995, however the reserves competition was not dissolved until the end of the 1999 season.
- Advertising was permitted for the first time on the backs of guernseys. Small sponsors' logos had previously been permitted over the breast and on the shorts, but the new regulations allowed for logos 30 cm long and 8 cm high below the number on the back of the guernsey, which has since become the prime advertising location on guernseys. Under the original rules, the logo was required to be consistent with the colour of the guernsey, a stipulation which has since been relaxed.

== Home-and-away season ==
=== Round 1 ===
Home team	Home team score	Away team	Away team score	Ground	Crowd	Date
Collingwood	17.12 (114)	Fitzroy	16.7 (103)	Victoria Park	25,602	Saturday 26, March
Footscray	17.11 (113)	Richmond	17.9 (111)	Whitten Oval	18,592	Saturday 26, March
St Kilda	15.7 (97)	Hawthorn	23.15 (153)	Waverley Park	29,582	Saturday 26, March
Essendon	12.10 (82)	West Coast	11.13 (79)	MCG	39,492	Saturday 26, March
Melbourne	26.18 (174)	Geelong	16.13 (109)	MCG	39,741	Sunday 27, March
Brisbane Bears	13.21 (99)	Sydney	12.17 (89)	Gabba	7,901	Sunday 27, March
Adelaide	22.18 (150)	Carlton	13.6 (84)	Football Park	44,953	Sunday 27, March

=== Round 2 ===
	Round 2
Saturday, 2 April (2:00 pm)	Fitzroy 17.10 (112)	def.	Essendon 14.15 (99)	Optus Oval (crowd: 24,872)	Report
Saturday, 2 April (2:00 pm)	North Melbourne 21.16 (142)	def.	St Kilda 10.13 (73)	MCG (crowd: 27,195)	Report
Saturday, 2 April (2:08 pm)	Hawthorn 8.16 (64)	def. by	Melbourne 17.16 (118)	Waverley Park (crowd: 29,581)	Report
Sunday, 3 April (2:08 pm)	Richmond 20.14 (134)	def.	Brisbane Bears 11.6 (72)	MCG (crowd: 15,333)	Report
Sunday, 3 April (2:15 pm)	West Coast 14.13 (97)	def.	Adelaide 11.12 (78)	Subiaco Oval (crowd: 28,228)	Report
Monday, 4 April (2:00 pm)	Geelong 22.20 (152)	def.	Footscray 8.16 (64)	Kardinia Park (crowd: 24,019)	Report
Monday, 4 April (2:08 pm)	Carlton 9.12 (66)	def. by	Collingwood 14.16 (100)	MCG (crowd: 85,063)	Report
	Bye; Sydney
Under pressure to respond after their poor showing against Melbourne the previous week, Geelong scored their biggest win over Footscray, starting and finishing strongly to run out winners by 88 points. Gary Ablett kicked seven goals and ruckman John Barnes' masterful display (22 hit-outs and 24 disposals) would gain him three Brownlow votes. In the middle of the week, the Footscray board sacked Terry Wheeler and replaced him with ex-Hawthorn coach Alan Joyce.

Home team	Home team score	Away team	Away team score	Ground	Crowd	Date
Fitzroy	17.10 (112)	Essendon	14.15 (99)	Optus Oval	24,872	Saturday 2, April
North Melbourne	21.16 (142)	St Kilda	10.13 (73)	MCG	27,195	Saturday 2, April
Hawthorn	8.16 (64)	Melbourne	17.16 (118)	Waverley Park	29,581	Saturday 2, April
West Coast	14.13 (97)	Adelaide	11.12 (78)	Subiaco Oval	28,228	Sunday 3, April
Richmond	20.14 (134)	Brisbane Bears	11.6 (72)	MCG	15,333	Sunday 3, April
Geelong	22.20 (152)	Footscray	8.16 (64)	Kardinia Park	24,019	Monday 4, April
Carlton	9.12 (66)	Collingwood	14.16 (100)	MCG	85,063	Monday 4, April

=== Round 3 ===
Home team	Home team	Away team	Away team score	Ground	Crowd	Date
North Melbourne	25.23 (173)	Hawthorn	6.10 (46)	MCG	36,726	Friday 8, April
St Kilda	16.12 (108)	Essendon	14.10 (94)	Waverley Park	30,454	Saturday 9, April
Fitzroy	17.9 (111)	Brisbane Bears	12.6 (78)	Whitten Oval	8,829	Saturday 9, April
Richmond	5.9 (39)	West Coast	20.15 (135)	MCG	19,609	Saturday 9, April
Carlton	14.15 (99)	Geelong	10.10 (70)	Optus Oval	28,496	Sunday 10, April
Collingwood	14.11 (95)	Footscray	12.22 (94)	MCG	38,307	Sunday 10, April
Sydney	21.9 (135)	Adelaide	24.10 (154)	SCG	11,068	Sunday 10, April

=== Round 4 ===
Home team	Home team score	Away team	Away team score	Ground	Crowd	Date
Sydney	11.20 (86)	Richmond	10.12 (72)	SCG	9,727	Friday 15, April
Hawthorn	11.7 (73)	Carlton	24.16 (160)	Waverley Park	30,944	Saturday 16, April
Footscray	14.15 (99)	North Melbourne	17.10 (112)	Whitten Oval	21,630	Saturday 16, April
Essendon	9.12 (66)	Melbourne	12.12 (84)	MCG	61,193	Saturday 16, April
West Coast	18.21 (129)	Fitzroy	8.5 (53)	WACA	28,980	Saturday 16, April
Brisbane Bears	22.19 (151)	St Kilda	15.8 (98)	Gabba	11,290	Sunday 17, April
Adelaide	15.14 (104)	Geelong	11.11 (77)	Football Park	45,638	Sunday 17, April

=== Round 5 ===
Home team	Home team score	Away team	Away team score	Ground	Crowd	Date
Melbourne	17.15 (117)	Brisbane Bears	4.6 (30)	MCG	20,946	Friday 22, April
Geelong	17.18 (120)	North Melbourne	15.15 (105)	Kardinia Park	23,490	Saturday 23, April
Fitzroy	20.17 (137)	Sydney	20.9 (129)	Whitten Oval	10,514	Saturday 23, April
Essendon	14.14 (98)	Collingwood	14.10 (94)	MCG	74,330	Saturday 23, April
Adelaide	13.15 (93)	Footscray	17.8 (110)	Football Park	44,426	Sunday 24, April
West Coast	8.10 (58)	Hawthorn	19.15 (129)	Subiaco Oval	27,357	Sunday 24, April
St Kilda	10.10 (70)	Richmond	15.22 (112)	Waverley Park	37,870	Monday 25, April

=== Round 6 ===
Home team	Home team score	Away team	Away team score	Ground	Crowd	Date
Carlton	20.14 (134)	Sydney	11.8 (74)	Optus Oval	22,810	Saturday 30, April
Collingwood	8.7 (55)	Melbourne	9.6 (60)	Waverley Park	47,211	Saturday 30, April
North Melbourne	13.8 (86)	West Coast	18.15 (123)	MCG	27,022	Saturday 30, April
Brisbane Bears	17.8 (110)	Adelaide	18.13 (121)	Gabba	9,457	Saturday 30, April

=== Round 7 ===
Home team	Home team score	Away team	Away team score	Ground	Crowd	Date
Hawthorn	12.16 (88)	Essendon	11.9 (75)	Waverley Park	33,927	Saturday 7, May
Richmond	20.13 (133)	Fitzroy	13.14 (92)	Optus Oval	14,614	Saturday 7, May
Melbourne	8.10 (58)	North Melbourne	13.12 (90)	MCG	34,601	Saturday 7, May
Sydney	17.7 (109)	St Kilda	16.14 (110)	SCG	9,295	Sunday 8, May
Geelong	18.16 (124)	Collingwood	13.18 (96)	MCG	52,342	Sunday 8, May
Footscray	12.14 (86)	Brisbane Bears	7.7 (49)	Whitten Oval	12,181	Sunday 8, May
West Coast	16.19 (115)	Carlton	6.13 (49)	Subiaco Oval	26,676	Sunday 8, May

=== Round 8 ===
Home team	Home team score	Away team	Away team score	Ground	Crowd	Date
Richmond	16.11 (107)	Carlton	20.15 (135)	MCG	50,227	Friday 13, May
Hawthorn	25.16 (166)	Brisbane Bears	10.7 (67)	Waverley Park	12,233	Saturday 14, May
Fitzroy	13.12 (90)	North Melbourne	17.17 (119)	Whitten Oval	11,334	Saturday 14, May
Collingwood	19.13 (127)	St Kilda	11.12 (78)	MCG	35,851	Saturday 14, May
Melbourne	13.13 (91)	Footscray	14.10 (94)	MCG	28,559	Sunday 15, May
Sydney	9.17 (71)	Geelong	25.15 (165)	SCG	11,142	Sunday 15, May
Essendon	20.11 (131)	Adelaide	13.10 (88)	Optus Oval	28,626	Sunday 15, May

=== Round 9 ===
Home team	Home team score	Away team	Away team score	Ground	Crowd	Date
North Melbourne	17.19 (121)	Collingwood	13.10 (88)	MCG	72,216	Friday 20, May
Geelong	21.16 (142)	Richmond	11.12 (78)	Kardinia Park	22,777	Saturday 21, May
Melbourne	14.13 (97)	Sydney	16.10 (106)	MCG	19,333	Saturday 21, May
Carlton	7.20 (62)	Essendon	9.9 (63)	Waverley Park	40,080	Saturday 21, May
Footscray	7.10 (52)	West Coast	12.11 (83)	Whitten Oval	14,923	Saturday 21, May
Adelaide	7.6 (48)	Hawthorn	22.13 (145)	Football Park	44,403	Sunday 22, May
St Kilda	11.9 (75)	Fitzroy	8.14 (62)	Waverley Park	15,249	Sunday 22, May

=== Round 10 ===
Home team	Home team score	Away team	Away team score	Ground	Crowd	Date
West Coast	14.17 (101)	Sydney	10.15 (75)	WACA	27,901	Friday 27, May
Carlton	16.13 (109)	Footscray	13.19 (97)	Optus Oval	23,691	Saturday 28, May
St Kilda	4.8 (32)	Melbourne	15.16 (106)	Waverley Park	19,914	Saturday 28, May
Collingwood	16.14 (110)	Hawthorn	10.14 (74)	Victoria Park	26,718	Saturday 28, May
Essendon	16.16 (112)	Geelong	15.11 (101)	MCG	75,129	Saturday 28, May
Brisbane Bears	17.18 (120)	North Melbourne	12.21 (93)	Gabba	10,953	Sunday 29, May
Adelaide	15.13 (103)	Fitzroy	9.10 (64)	Football Park	42,915	Sunday 29, May

=== Round 11 ===
Home team	Home team score	Away team	Away team score	Ground	Crowd	Date
Fitzroy	12.8 (80)	Carlton	20.15 (135)	Waverley Park	19,090	Saturday 4, June
Essendon	24.10 (154)	Richmond	17.6 (108)	Optus Oval	22,547	Saturday 4, June
Geelong	15.11 (101)	Brisbane Bears	19.12 (126)	Kardinia Park	18,599	Saturday 4, June
Collingwood	13.12 (90)	Adelaide	8.19 (67)	Victoria Park	27,390	Saturday 4, June
Hawthorn	20.5 (125)	Footscray	8.13 (61)	Waverley Park	22,895	Sunday 5, June
Sydney	16.10 (106)	North Melbourne	19.12 (126)	SCG	11,182	Sunday 5, June
Melbourne	11.8 (74)	West Coast	18.10 (118)	MCG	31,324	Sunday 5, June

=== Round 12 ===
	Round 12
Saturday, 11 June (2:00 pm)	Geelong 17.11 (113)	def.	St Kilda 16.14 (110)	Kardinia Park (crowd: 23,696)	Report
Saturday, 11 June (2:08 pm)	North Melbourne 21.23 (149)	def.	Adelaide 10.9 (69)	Optus Oval (crowd: 16,643)	Report
Saturday, 11 June (2:08 pm)	Melbourne 13.16 (94)	def. by	Carlton 18.13 (121)	MCG (crowd: 52,199)	Report
Sunday, 12 June (1:15 pm)	Sydney 13.5 (83)	def. by	Hawthorn 21.15 (141)	SCG (crowd: 12,251)	Report
Sunday, 12 June (4:15 pm)	West Coast 11.12 (78)	def.	Brisbane Bears 10.9 (69)	Subiaco Oval (crowd: 23,492)	Report
Monday, 13 June (2:00 pm)	Footscray 13.14 (92)	def.	Essendon 9.10 (64)	Waverley Park (crowd: 39,181)	Report
Monday, 13 June (2:08 pm)	Richmond 14.18 (102)	def.	Collingwood 4.12 (36)	MCG (crowd: 61,983)	Report
	Bye; Fitzroy
Despite missing key players Robert Harvey, Stewart Loewe and Tony Lockett, St Kilda led Geelong at three-quarter time by 26 points after kicking seven goals to nil in the third quarter. However, a spectacular last quarter by Gary Ablett in which he kicked four of his seven goals, and an intercept of Rod Keogh's attempted pass in the forward pocket to Nicky Winmar in the final minute, enabled the Cats to escape with a three-point win.

=== Round 13 ===
Home team	Home team score	Away team	Away team score	Ground	Crowd	Date
Carlton	22.13 (145)	St Kilda	10.5 (65)	Optus Oval	22,927	Saturday 18, June
Hawthorn	7.11 (53)	Fitzroy	10.6 (66)	Waverley Park	17,599	Saturday 18, June
Richmond	9.18 (72)	North Melbourne	10.7 (67)	MCG	26,917	Saturday 18, June
Footscray	20.14 (134)	Sydney	9.6 (60)	Whitten Oval	13,070	Sunday 19, June
Brisbane Bears	17.12 (114)	Essendon	11.15 (81)	Gabba	18,484	Sunday 19, June
Collingwood	18.13 (121)	West Coast	12.12 (84)	MCG	27,699	Sunday 19, June
Adelaide	11.17 (83)	Melbourne	12.6 (78)	Football Park	41,189	Sunday 19, June

=== Round 14 ===
Home team	Home team score	Away team	Away team score	Ground	Crowd	Date
North Melbourne	13.10 (88)	Carlton	15.16 (106)	MCG	45,177	Friday 24, June
Footscray	21.18 (144)	Fitzroy	6.4 (40)	Whitten Oval	16,085	Saturday 25, June
Melbourne	9.8 (62)	Richmond	11.12 (78)	MCG	32,528	Saturday 25, June
St Kilda	12.7 (79)	Adelaide	11.13 (79)	Waverley Park	13,868	Saturday 25, June
Geelong	10.15 (75)	West Coast	14.9 (93)	Kardinia Park	21,939	Saturday 25, June
Essendon	19.15 (129)	Sydney	14.11 (95)	MCG	27,094	Sunday 26, June
Brisbane Bears	17.19 (121)	Collingwood	11.11 (77)	Gabba	18,881	Sunday 26, June

=== Round 15 ===
Home team	Home team score	Away team	Away team score	Ground	Crowd	Date
West Coast	19.14 (128)	St Kilda	7.7 (49)	WACA	24,632	Friday 1, July
North Melbourne	11.19 (85)	Essendon	14.8 (92)	MCG	50,141	Saturday 2, July
Hawthorn	16.19 (115)	Geelong	11.13 (79)	Waverley Park	35,267	Saturday 2, July
Fitzroy	9.11 (65)	Melbourne	16.15 (111)	Whitten Oval	8,484	Saturday 2, July
Carlton	22.12 (144)	Brisbane Bears	6.10 (46)	Optus Oval	21,119	Saturday 2, July
Sydney	10.13 (73)	Collingwood	13.15 (93)	SCG	13,083	Sunday 3, July
Adelaide	12.11 (83)	Richmond	13.12 (90)	Football Park	43,052	Sunday 3, July

=== Round 16 ===
Home team	Home team score	Away team	Away team score	Ground	Crowd	Date
Fitzroy	11.14 (80)	Collingwood	19.15 (129)	Whitten Oval	15,394	Saturday 9, July
Geelong	22.13 (145)	Melbourne	17.13 (115)	Kardinia Park	23,687	Saturday 9, July
Hawthorn	21.16 (142)	St Kilda	11.12 (78)	Waverley Park	25,037	Saturday 9, July
Richmond	14.13 (97)	Footscray	12.22 (94)	MCG	49,878	Saturday 9, July
Sydney	15.20 (110)	Brisbane Bears	21.9 (135)	SCG	5,728	Sunday 10, July
West Coast	11.14 (80)	Essendon	5.14 (44)	Subiaco Oval	29,723	Sunday 10, July
Carlton	20.16 (136)	Adelaide	10.16 (76)	Optus Oval	29,695	Sunday 10, July

=== Round 17 ===
Home team	Home team score	Away team	Away team score	Ground	Crowd	Date
Melbourne	17.10 (112)	Hawthorn	11.8 (74)	Optus Oval	14,096	Saturday 16, July
Footscray	17.11 (113)	Geelong	13.7 (85)	Whitten Oval	23,953	Saturday 16, July
St Kilda	8.7 (55)	North Melbourne	17.14 (116)	Waverley Park	21,097	Saturday 16, July
Collingwood	7.12 (54)	Carlton	14.13 (97)	MCG	85,831	Saturday 16, July
Essendon	24.9 (153)	Fitzroy	12.17 (89)	MCG	33,265	Sunday 17, July
Brisbane Bears	12.12 (84)	Richmond	15.8 (98)	Gabba	14,936	Sunday 17, July
Adelaide	12.10 (82)	West Coast	11.12 (78)	Football Park	42,860	Sunday 17, July

=== Round 18 ===
Home team	Home team score	Away team	Away team score	Ground	Crowd	Date
Adelaide	10.15 (75)	Sydney	13.9 (87)	Football Park	43,788	Friday 22, July
Footscray	13.9 (87)	Collingwood	7.13 (55)	Whitten Oval	25,540	Saturday 23, July
Essendon	15.10 (100)	St Kilda	18.2 (110)	MCG	38,858	Saturday 23, July
Hawthorn	9.5 (59)	North Melbourne	15.9 (99)	Waverley Park	26,936	Saturday 23, July
Brisbane Bears	8.17 (65)	Fitzroy	7.16 (58)	Gabba	8,236	Sunday 24, July
Geelong	13.12 (90)	Carlton	8.6 (54)	Waverley Park	42,930	Sunday 24, July
West Coast	14.17 (101)	Richmond	7.11 (53)	Subiaco Oval	26,020	Sunday 24, July

=== Round 19 ===
Home team	Home team score	Away team	Away team score	Ground	Crowd	Date
North Melbourne	15.12 (102)	Footscray	12.10 (82)	MCG	32,845	Friday 29, July
Melbourne	21.9 (135)	Essendon	8.10 (58)	MCG	43,132	Saturday 30, July
St Kilda	5.15 (45)	Brisbane Bears	8.7 (55)	Waverley Park	12,927	Saturday 30, July
Carlton	15.14 (104)	Hawthorn	9.18 (72)	Optus Oval	25,265	Saturday 30, July
Richmond	14.11 (95)	Sydney	9.8 (62)	MCG	23,906	Sunday 31, July
Geelong	13.13 (91)	Adelaide	5.8 (38)	Kardinia Park	15,383	Sunday 31, July
Fitzroy	3.8 (26)	West Coast	13.14 (92)	Whitten Oval	5,334	Sunday 31, July

=== Round 20 ===
Home team	Home team score	Away team	Away team score	Ground	Crowd	Date
Collingwood	19.20 (134)	Essendon	17.4 (106)	MCG	76,565	Friday 5, August
Richmond	12.21 (93)	St Kilda	9.7 (61)	MCG	33,503	Saturday 6, August
North Melbourne	11.11 (77)	Geelong	10.18 (78)	Optus Oval	26,014	Saturday 6, August
Hawthorn	15.10 (100)	West Coast	7.12 (54)	Waverley Park	16,328	Saturday 6, August
Brisbane Bears	12.12 (84)	Melbourne	14.15 (99)	Gabba	12,341	Sunday 7, August
Footscray	17.16 (118)	Adelaide	4.10 (34)	Whitten Oval	17,591	Sunday 7, August
Sydney	9.12 (66)	Fitzroy	13.16 (94)	SCG	6,513	Sunday 7, August

=== Round 21 ===
Home team	Home team score	Away team	Away team score	Ground	Crowd	Date
West Coast	10.13 (73)	North Melbourne	9.10 (64)	WACA	31,948	Friday 12, August
St Kilda	10.12 (72)	Footscray	17.15 (117)	Waverley Park	14,653	Saturday 13, August
Fitzroy	8.11 (59)	Geelong	13.22 (100)	Optus Oval	11,388	Saturday 13, August
Melbourne	9.10 (64)	Collingwood	13.14 (92)	MCG	49,872	Saturday 13, August
Sydney	9.16 (70)	Carlton	8.14 (62)	SCG	9,622	Sunday 14, August
Richmond	11.23 (89)	Hawthorn	18.9 (117)	MCG	52,562	Sunday 14, August
Adelaide	13.11 (89)	Brisbane Bears	12.14 (86)	Football Park	36,599	Sunday 14, August

=== Round 22 ===
Home team	Home team score	Away team	Away team score	Ground	Crowd	Date
North Melbourne	12.11 (83)	Melbourne	15.13 (103)	MCG	32,951	Friday 19, August
St Kilda	17.12 (114)	Sydney	11.15 (81)	Waverley Park	13,454	Saturday 20, August
Fitzroy	10.9 (69)	Richmond	19.15 (129)	Whitten Oval	12,122	Saturday 20, August
Collingwood	15.17 (107)	Geelong	16.8 (104)	MCG	66,555	Saturday 20, August
Essendon	20.16 (136)	Hawthorn	12.12 (84)	MCG	49,354	Sunday 21, August
Brisbane Bears	13.10 (88)	Footscray	14.14 (98)	Gabba	10,572	Sunday 21, August
Carlton	19.12 (126)	West Coast	8.14 (62)	Optus Oval	28,038	Sunday 21, August

=== Round 23 ===
Home team	Home team score	Away team	Away team score	Ground	Crowd	Date
North Melbourne	25.10 (160)	Fitzroy	10.14 (74)	MCG	17,960	Friday 26, August
Carlton	25.11 (161)	Richmond	6.12 (48)	Optus Oval	32,486	Saturday 27, August
St Kilda	14.6 (90)	Collingwood	13.10 (88)	Waverley Park	40,154	Saturday 27, August
Geelong	16.15 (111)	Sydney	15.9 (99)	Kardinia Park	22,208	Saturday 27, August
Footscray	16.15 (111)	Melbourne	11.5 (71)	Whitten Oval	23,615	Saturday 27, August
Brisbane Bears	13.13 (91)	Hawthorn	15.12 (102)	Gabba	13,718	Sunday 28, August
Adelaide	17.13 (115)	Essendon	8.10 (58)	Football Park	41,669	Sunday 28, August

=== Round 24 ===
	Round 24
Friday, 2 September (8:08 pm)	Collingwood 8.14 (62)	def. by	North Melbourne 19.12 (126)	MCG (crowd: 72,932)	Report
Saturday, 3 September (2:00 pm)	Essendon 12.8 (80)	def.	Carlton 9.8 (62)	MCG (crowd: 61,231)	Report
Saturday, 3 September (2:00 pm)	Fitzroy 15.12 (102)	def. by	St Kilda 21.14 (140)	Western Oval (crowd: 10,809)	Report
Saturday, 3 September (2:08 pm)	Hawthorn 9.12 (66)	def.	Adelaide 6.11 (47)	Waverley Park (crowd: 22,973)	Report
Saturday, 3 September (2:08 pm)	Richmond 13.17 (95)	def. by	Geelong 27.9 (171)	Optus Oval (crowd: 25,112)	Report
Sunday, 4 September (1:15 pm)	Sydney 18.13 (121)	def. by	Melbourne 27.5 (167)	SCG (crowd: 8,344)	Report
Sunday, 4 September (4:15 pm)	West Coast 17.15 (117)	def.	Footscray 6.10 (46)	Subiaco Oval (crowd: 26,992)	Report
	Bye; Brisbane Bears
West Coast's 71-point win over Footscray was marred by an ugly brawl at half-time after Brett Heady was knocked out by a bump from Stephen Wallis. In the midst of the brawl, Footscray defender Daniel Southern applied a choke hold on West Coast full-forward Peter Sumich, causing him to pass out. Southern was subsequently fined $10,000.

== Ladder ==
(P)	Premiers
	Qualified for finals

#	Team	P	W	L	D	PF	PA	%	Pts
1	West Coast (P)	22	16	6	0	2078	1572	132.2	64
2	Carlton	22	15	7	0	2351	1774	132.5	60
3	North Melbourne	22	13	9	0	2383	1848	129.0	52
4	Geelong	22	13	9	0	2403	2104	114.2	52
5	Footscray	22	13	9	0	2106	1905	110.6	52
6	Hawthorn	22	13	9	0	2188	2005	109.1	52
7	Melbourne	22	12	10	0	2190	1879	116.6	48
8	Collingwood	22	12	10	0	2017	2019	99.9	48
9	Richmond	22	12	10	0	2033	2167	93.8	48
10	Essendon	22	11	11	0	2075	2119	97.9	44
11	Adelaide	22	9	12	1	1876	2159	86.9	38
12	Brisbane Bears	22	9	13	0	1940	2195	88.4	36
13	St Kilda	22	7	14	1	1809	2415	74.9	30
14	Fitzroy	22	5	17	0	1726	2456	70.3	20
15	Sydney	22	4	18	0	1987	2545	78.1	16

Rules for classification: 1. premiership points; 2. percentage; 3. points for
Average score: 94.4
Source: AFL Tables

== Finals ==
The second McIntyre "final six" system, which had operated in 1992 and 1993, was replaced by the McIntyre "final eight" system. The McIntyre "final eight" system would be used until 1999 and was then replaced by the AFL’s Amended "final eight" system in 2000.

=== Week one ===
	Qualifying finals
Saturday, 10 September (2:30 pm)	North Melbourne 15.24 (114)	def.	Hawthorn 13.13 (91)	Waverley Park (crowd: 38,223)	Report
Saturday, 10 September (7:45 pm)	Geelong 15.16 (106)	def.	Footscray 15.11 (101)	MCG (crowd: 61,182)	Report
Sunday, 11 September (2:10 pm)	Carlton 14.12 (96)	def. by	Melbourne 18.15 (123)	MCG (crowd: 56,111)	Report
Sunday, 11 September (4:45 pm)	West Coast 11.16 (82)	def.	Collingwood 12.8 (80)	WACA Ground (crowd: 31,824)	Report
The third qualifying final between North Melbourne and Hawthorn was the first AFL finals match to require extra time; the provision for extra time rather than a full replay had been introduced after the 1990 finals series. North Melbourne 12.19 (91) and Hawthorn 13.13 (91) were tied after four quarters, and North Melbourne dominated extra time, kicking 3.5 to Hawthorn's nil, to win by 23 points.

=== Semi finals ===
Home team	Score	Away team	Score	Venue	Attendance	Date
Geelong	15.15 (105)	Carlton	10.12 (72)	Waverley Park	53,160	Saturday, 17 September
Melbourne	21.18 (144)	Footscray	9.11 (65)	MCG	65,577	Sunday, 18 September

=== Preliminary Final ===
Home team	Score	Away team	Score	Venue	Attendance	Date
North Melbourne	14.19 (103)	Geelong	16.13 (109)	MCG	80,121	Saturday, 24 September
West Coast	16.21 (117)	Melbourne	8.4 (52)	WACA	34,317	Saturday, 24 September

=== Grand final ===
Home team	Score	Away team	Score	Venue	Attendance	Date
West Coast	20.23 (143)	Geelong	8.15 (63)	MCG	93,860	Saturday, 1 October

== Awards ==
- The Brownlow Medal was awarded to Greg Williams of Carlton.
- The Leigh Matthews Trophy was awarded to Greg Williams of Carlton.
- The Coleman Medal was awarded to Gary Ablett of Geelong.
- The Norm Smith Medal was awarded to Dean Kemp of West Coast.
- The AFL Rising Star award was awarded to Chris Scott of Brisbane Bears.
- The Wooden Spoon was "awarded" to Sydney.

== Notable events ==
- Fitzroy moved its match-day home ground from Princes Park (which, due to the first ever ground naming rights deal affecting an AFL venue, became known as Optus Oval from this season) to the Western Oval. However, this left Carlton as the sole tenant of Optus Oval, and an existing arrangement between Carlton and the AFL required eighteen matches to be played there during the year; consequently, Fitzroy and the MCG's four co-tenants (Essendon, Richmond, Melbourne and North Melbourne) were each forced to play one or two home games at Optus Oval to make up the balance.
- Starting from Round 20, the "blood rule" was introduced in order to allay fears raised by the threat of AIDS. Under the rule, any bleeding player would be sent from the field by the umpires until his wound had been covered or closed and any blood-stained gear replaced. The rule, which for the first time ever gave umpires the ability to order players from the ground, was not initially well-received – particularly following a Round 23 incident in which Hawthorn ruckman Stephen Lawrence was unable to return to the field after the third quarter because Hawthorn officials could not find a spare sock to replace his bloodstained one.
- The MCG became Collingwood's predominant home ground for the first time, however they would still play sporadic home games at Victoria Park until 1999 against mostly low crowd drawing and/or interstate opposition. To this day, the MCG has remained Collingwood's predominant home ground.

== See also ==
- McIntyre "final eight" system

== Sources ==
- 1994 AFL season at AFL Tables
- 1994 AFL season at Australian Football
