= List of AFL debuts in 1993 =

The 1993 Australian Football League (AFL) season was the 97th season of the VFL/AFL. The season saw 78 Australian rules footballers make their senior AFL debut and a further 54 transfer to new clubs having previously played for other teams in the AFL.

== Summary ==
Summary of debuts in 1993
Club	VFL debuts	Change of club
Adelaide	4	3
Brisbane	5	10
Carlton	3	1
Collingwood	3	1
Essendon	3	0
Fitzroy	5	4
Footscray	5	3
Geelong	5	2
Hawthorn	3	3
Melbourne	6	2
North Melbourne	5	4
Richmond	11	4
St Kilda	8	5
Sydney	6	11
West Coast	6	1
Total	78	54

== Debuts ==
Name	Club	Age at debut	Round debuted	Games	Goals	Notes
Mark Ricciuto	Adelaide	17 years, 326 days	6	312	292	
Matthew Robran	Adelaide	22 years, 37 days	9	130	110	Son of Barrie Robran and brother of Jonathan Robran. Previously played for Hawthorn.
Greg Anderson	Adelaide	26 years, 318 days	1	59	19	Previously played for Essendon.
Mark Viska	Adelaide	22 years, 31 days	10	33	1	
Matthew Powell	Adelaide	19 years, 273 days	13	16	4	Father of Tom Powell.
Chris Groom	Adelaide	19 years, 212 days	1	12	8	
Stuart Wigney	Adelaide	24 years, 124 days	21	10	20	Brother of Brad Wigney. Previously played for Footscray and Sydney.
Justin Leppitsch	Brisbane Bears	17 years, 177 days	1	227	194	
Adrian Fletcher	Brisbane Bears	23 years, 168 days	1	107	49	Father of Jaspa Fletcher. Previously played for Geelong and St Kilda.
Matthew Clarke	Brisbane Bears	19 years, 190 days	1	130	19	
Dion Scott	Brisbane Bears	23 years, 10 days	3	73	61	Previously played for Sydney.
Nathan Chapman	Brisbane Bears	17 years, 324 days	1	60	13	
Paul Peos	Brisbane Bears	25 years, 64 days	2	33	40	Previously played for West Coast.
Danny Craven	Brisbane Bears	25 years, 364 days	6	25	7	Previously played for St Kilda.
Fabian Francis	Brisbane Bears	19 years, 160 days	2	22	17	Step-father of Jason Horne-Francis. Previously played for Melbourne.
Damian Bourke	Brisbane Bears	28 years, 158 days	13	22	4	Father of Jordon Bourke. Previously played for Geelong.
Brendan McCormack	Brisbane Bears	22 years, 301 days	5	12	9	Previously played for Fitzroy.
Michael Murphy	Brisbane Bears	27 years, 206 days	2	10	22	Previously played for North Melbourne and Adelaide.
Paul Spargo	Brisbane Bears	26 years, 191 days	4	9	9	Grandson of Bob Spargo Sr., son of Bob Spargo jnr, nephew of Ricky Spargo and father of Charlie Spargo. Previously played for North Melbourne.
John Parker	Brisbane Bears	22 years, 54 days	15	3	0	
Martin Heffernan	Brisbane Bears	20 years, 296 days	12	2	1	Previously played for Geelong.
Brad Pearce	Brisbane Bears	21 years, 357 days	19	2	1	
Andrew McKay	Carlton	22 years, 256 days	1	244	28	Father of Abbie McKay.
Tim Powell	Carlton	25 years, 25 days	7	11	10	Previously played for Richmond.
Scott Spalding	Carlton	24 years, 206 days	1	1	0	Brother of Earl Spalding.
Jeremy Smith	Carlton	19 years, 196 days	8	1	1	
Kent Butcher	Collingwood	19 years, 198 days	9	22	3	
Barry Mitchell	Collingwood	27 years, 109 days	1	13	8	Father of Tom Mitchell. Previously played for Sydney.
Andrew Tranquilli	Collingwood	21 years, 108 days	19	12	20	
Glenn Sandford	Collingwood	21 years, 195 days	2	5	1	
Dustin Fletcher	Essendon	17 years, 331 days	2	400	71	Essendon games record holder. Son of Ken Fletcher.
Rick Olarenshaw	Essendon	20 years, 70 days	3	77	14	
Tony Delaney	Essendon	17 years, 91 days	1	15	9	
John McCarthy	Fitzroy	26 years, 11 days	3	71	77	Previously played for North Melbourne.
Simon Hawking	Fitzroy	20 years, 120 days	14	60	30	
Mark Zanotti	Fitzroy	28 years, 139 days	1	57	8	Previously played for West Coast and Brisbane.
James Manson	Fitzroy	26 years, 159 days	3	47	20	Son of Jim Manson. Previously played for Collingwood.
Anthony McGregor	Fitzroy	20 years, 363 days	14	41	11	
Michael Dunstan	Fitzroy	22 years, 15 days	1	38	30	
Danny Morton	Fitzroy	19 years, 331 days	10	30	17	
Tom Kavanagh	Fitzroy	23 years, 108 days	19	8	1	Previously played for Melbourne.
Darren Payne	Fitzroy	19 years, 30 days	18	6	1	
Scott West	Footscray	18 years, 132 days	1	324	104	Father of Rhylee West.
Peter Quill	Footscray	23 years, 244 days	5	67	20	
Ilija Grgic	Footscray	21 years, 29 days	2	62	92	
Brad Nicholson	Footscray	19 years, 50 days	17	34	1	
Luke Beveridge	Footscray	22 years, 300 days	12	31	29	Coached the Western Bulldogs to the 2016 AFL Premiership. Grandson of Jack Beveridge. Previously played for Melbourne.
Anthony Darcy	Footscray	22 years, 300 days	6	14	2	Previously played for Geelong.
Alan Thorpe	Footscray	24 years, 286 days	18	12	23	Previously played for Sydney.
Shane Ellen	Footscray	20 years, 99 days	3	11	1	
Ben Graham	Geelong	19 years, 292 days	21	219	145	Only person to captain an AFL and National Football League side.
Leigh Colbert	Geelong	17 years, 336 days	7	105	50	
Liam Pickering	Geelong	24 years, 215 days	3	102	46	Son of Michaerl Pickering. Previously played for North Melbourne.
Paul Lynch	Geelong	19 years, 181 days	4	62	55	Son of Fred Lynch.
Leigh Tudor	Geelong	23 years, 204 days	4	60	53	Previously played for North Melbourne.
Stephen O'Reilly	Geelong	20 years, 154 days	3	36	5	
Leigh Willison	Geelong	23 years, 164 days	1	3	4	
Shane Crawford	Hawthorn	18 years, 199 days	1	305	224	1999 Brownlow Medallist. Brother of Justin Crawford.
Mark Graham	Hawthorn	20 years, 48 days	6	243	63	
Darren Baxter	Hawthorn	28 years, 8 days	1	27	2	Son of Ray Baxter. Previously played for Footscray.
Mark Bunn	Hawthorn	22 years, 217 days	10	23	1	Previously played for Fitzroy.
Scott Crow	Hawthorn	19 years, 183 days	12	13	2	
Tim Allen	Hawthorn	22 years, 229 days	10	11	4	Previously played for St Kilda.
David Neitz	Melbourne	18 years, 64 days	1	306	631	
Paul Hopgood	Melbourne	19 years, 270 days	4	113	10	
Greg Doyle	Melbourne	22 years, 205 days	4	29	14	Previously played for St Kilda.
Phil Gilbert	Melbourne	23 years, 132 days	1	25	6	
Martin Pike	Melbourne	20 years, 133 days	1	24	25	
Glenn Molloy	Melbourne	21 years, 258 days	10	20	4	Son of Graham Molloy.
Jason Norrish	Melbourne	21 years,158 days	14	20	2	
Scott Simister	Melbourne	20 years, 110 days	11	3	2	
Adrian Campbell	Melbourne	20 years, 337 days	21	2	5	Previously played for Footscray.
John Blakey	North Melbourne	26 years, 246 days	1	224	72	Father of Nick Blakey. Previously played for Fitzroy.
Corey McKernan	North Melbourne	19 years, 216 days	17	196	250	Brother of Shaun McKernan.
Dean Laidley	North Melbourne	26 years, 0 days	1	99	4	Known as Dean Laidley throughout her playing career. Previously played for West Coast.
Adrian McAdam	North Melbourne	22 years, 42 days	5	36	92	Brother of Gilbert and Greg McAdam.
Jason Daniltchenko	North Melbourne	17 years, 222 days	3	29	18	
Robert Pyman	North Melbourne	21 years, 188 days	3	16	8	
Brendan Bower	North Melbourne	26 years, 235 days	1	2	3	Brother of Darren and Nathan Bower. Previously played for Richmond and Essendon.
Brad Sholl	North Melbourne	20 years, 255 days	17	2	0	Brother of Craig Sholl and cousin of Brett Sholl.
Greg Eppelstun	North Melbourne	26 years, 131 days	1	1	0	Previously played for Footscray.
Matthew Richardson	Richmond	18 years, 50 days	7	282	800	Son of Alan Richardson.
Duncan Kellaway	Richmond	20 years, 80 days	7	180	12	Brother of Andrew Kellaway.
Chris Bond	Richmond	24 years, 87 days	5	100	32	Previously played for Carlton.
Paul Bulluss	Richmond	23 years, 64 days	1	97	20	
Ashley Prescott	Richmond	20 years, 345 days	21	90	15	Son of David Prescott.
John Howat	Richmond	22 years, 256 days	1	45	2	Previously played for Melbourne.
Wayne Hernaman	Richmond	20 years, 317 days	1	20	9	
Robert Schaefer	Richmond	21 years, 42 days	1	11	3	
James Thiessen	Richmond	19 years, 156 days	16	7	3	Son of Tony Thiessen.
Simon Eishold	Richmond	26 years, 2 days	1	5	0	Previously played for Melbourne.
Brad Fox	Richmond	23 years, 295 days	18	4	0	Previously played for Essendon.
Adam Slater	Richmond	19 years, 150 days	1	3	1	
Mark Pitura	Richmond	18 years, 275 days	1	2	0	Son of John Pitura.
Stuart Steele	Richmond	21 years, 55 days	10	2	0	Grandson of Raymond Steele.
Simon Dennis	Richmond	20 years, 167 days	19	2	0	
Peter Everitt	St Kilda	18 years, 328 days	1	180	300	Brother of Andrejs Everitt.
Dean Anderson	St Kilda	25 years, 238 days	1	67	26	Father of Noah Anderson. Previously played for Hawthorn.
Craig O'Brien	St Kilda	23 years, 31 days	2	52	116	Previously played for Essendon.
Damen Shaw	St Kilda	19 years, 51 days	11	40	15	
Darren Bourke	St Kilda	23 years, 2 days	1	32	9	
Chris Hollow	St Kilda	21 years, 126 days	1	24	5	
Chris Wittman	St Kilda	27 years, 209 days	1	9	0	Previously played for Hawthorn.
Mark Arceri	St Kilda	28 years, 153 days	1	5	5	Previously played for North Melbourne and Carlton.
Ian Aitken	St Kilda	25 years, 364 days	8	5	0	Previously played for Carlton.
Martin Heppell	St Kilda	18 years, 239 days	15	5	0	
Brodie Atkinson	St Kilda	20 years, 316 days	1	2	0	
Nick Hanson	St Kilda	19 years, 236 days	8	1	0	
Leigh Capsalis	St Kilda	21 years, 221 days	18	1	0	
Greg Stafford	Sydney Swans	18 years, 234 days	4	130	58	
Dean McRae	Sydney Swans	24 years, 143 days	2	60	30	Previously played for North Melbourne.
Jayson Daniels	Sydney Swans	22 years, 44 days	2	58	4	Previously played for St Kilda.
Scott Direen	Sydney Swans	20 years, 215 days	9	52	10	
Scott Watters	Sydney Swans	24 years, 69 days	2	37	11	Previously played for West Coast.
Ed Considine	Sydney Swans	24 years, 197 days	2	28	6	Previously played for Essendon.
Michael Werner	Sydney Swans	23 years, 250 days	2	20	20	Previously played for Essendon.
Paul Bryce	Sydney Swans	19 years, 134 days	1	17	14	Previously played for North Melbourne and Melbourne.
Richard Osborne	Sydney Swans	28 years, 292 days	2	16	39	Previously played for Fitzroy.
John Hutton	Sydney Swans	26 years, 313 days	2	5	9	Previously played for Brisbane.
Tony Malakellis	Sydney Swans	23 years, 11 days	2	5	3	Brother of Spiro Malakellis. Previously played for Geelong.
Tony Begovich	Sydney Swans	25 years, 267 days	6	5	0	Previously played for West Coast.
Gavin McMahon	Sydney Swans	18 years, 212 days	21	5	0	
Richard Ambrose	Sydney Swans	21 years, 3 days	11	3	1	
Andrew Thomson	Sydney Swans	20 years, 137 days	8	2	1	
Aldo Dipetta	Sydney Swans	21 years, 188 days	15	2	0	Previously played for St Kilda.
Nathan Irvin	Sydney Swans	20 years, 163 days	2	1	0	
Drew Banfield	West Coast	19 years, 141 days	16	265	76	
Jarrad Schofield	West Coast	18 years, 134 days	11	63	34	
Tony Godden	West Coast	21 years, 118 days	20	13	8	
Damian Hampson	West Coast	23 years, 78 days	11	6	1	
Matthew Connell	West Coast	20 years, 237 days	1	3	0	
Brendon Retzlaff	West Coast	24 years, 65 days	13	3	0	Previously played for Brisbane.
Derek Hall	West Coast	22 years, 244 days	18	2	3	
