= 1992 AFL draft =

Draft for the Australian Football League

The 1992 AFL draft is the annual draft of talented players by Australian rules football teams that participate in the main competition of that sport, the Australian Football League. It consisted of the main national draft, the pre-season draft and the trade period.

In 1992 there were 124 picks to be drafted between 15 teams in the main national draft.

== 1992 mid-season draft ==
There was a mid-year draft held during the 1992 season. Players recruited in this draft were able to take their places in their AFL clubs in the latter part of the 1992 season, although not all chose to do so.

Pick	Player	Recruited from	New club
1	John Parker	Frankston Bombers	Brisbane Bears
2	Greg Doyle	Dandenong	Melbourne
3	Ian Herman	Carlton	Richmond
4	Tim Perkins	North Adelaide	North Melbourne
5	Dwaine Kretschmer	Glenelg	Sydney Swans
6	Jim West	Sydney Swans	Adelaide
7	Kane Batzloff	Southern Stingrays	Essendon
8	Greg Lochhead	University Blues	Hawthorn
9	David Johnston	Essendon	Fitzroy
10	Brent Heaver	Epping	Carlton
11	James McLure	Geelong	Collingwood
12	Garry Merritt	Tatura	St Kilda
13	Damian Hampson	Carlton	West Coast Eagles
14	Andrew MacNish	Subiaco	Geelong
15	Julian Shanks	Williamstown	Footscray
16	Brad Pearce	South Launceston	Brisbane Bears
17	Matthew Febey	Rochester	Melbourne
18	Andrew Tarpey	Sandringham	Richmond
19	Mark Attard	Eastern Ranges	North Melbourne
20	Peter Baldwin	North Hobart	Sydney Swans
21	Andrew Geddes	Strathmerton	Adelaide
22	John McNamara	Geelong	Essendon
23	Michael Blood	Old Melburnians	Hawthorn
24	Justin Clarkson	Ormond	Carlton
25	Ian McMullin	Essendon	Collingwood
26	Stephen Edgar	Carlton	St Kilda
27	Mark Ballan	Western Jets	Geelong
28	Brian McInnes	Williamstown	Footscray
29	Brian Stanislaus	North Launceston	Brisbane Bears
30	Tim Livingstone	Box Hill	Richmond
31	Paul McMaster	Essendon	Sydney Swans
32	Alan Schwartz	Essendon	Adelaide
33	Eric Lissenden	North Melbourne	Essendon
34	Kevin O'Donnell	Springvale	Hawthorn
35	David Glascott	Carlton	Carlton
36	Daniel Tramontana	Northern Knights	Collingwood
37	Darren King	Southern Stingrays	Geelong
38	Adam Aherne	North Launceston	Brisbane Bears
39	Daryn Cresswell	North Hobart	Sydney Swans
40	Daniel Winkel	Southern Stingrays	Essendon
41	Anthony McDonald	Coburg	Hawthorn
42	Darren Fraser	Collingwood	Collingwood
43	Brett Sherriff	Devonport	Brisbane Bears
44	Paul Atkins	Burnie Hawks	Sydney Swans
45	Mark Garthwaite	Essendon	Essendon
46	Travis St Clair	Kangaroo Flat	Hawthorn
47	Jon Hassall	Collingwood	Collingwood
48	Stephen Pears	Perth	Sydney Swans
49	Nick Probert	Prahran	Collingwood

== Trades ==
Player	Traded from	Traded to
Dion Scott	Sydney	Brisbane
Paul Peos	West Coast	Brisbane
Paul Spargo	North Melbourne	Brisbane
Scott Watters	West Coast	Sydney
Jayson Daniels	St Kilda	Sydney
Ed Considine	Essendon	Sydney
Dean McRae	North Melbourne	Sydney
Richard Ambrose	Essendon	Sydney
Tony Begovich	West Coast	Sydney
Tony Malakellis	Geelong	Sydney
Michael Werner	Essendon	Sydney
John Blakey	Fitzroy	North Melbourne
Dean Laidley	West Coast	North Melbourne
Adrian Campbell	Footscray	Melbourne
Tim Powell	Richmond	Carlton
Darren Baxter	Footscray	Hawthorn
Tim Allen	St Kilda	Hawthorn
Dean Anderson	Hawthorn	St Kilda
Ian Aitken	Carlton	St Kilda
Chris Wittman	Hawthorn	St Kilda
Luke Beveridge	Melbourne	Footscray
Liam Pickering	North Melbourne	Geelong
Darren Steele	North Melbourne	Geelong
Leigh Tudor	North Melbourne	Geelong
Matthew Robran	Hawthorn	Adelaide
Stuart Wigney	Sydney	Adelaide
James Manson	Collingwood	Fitzroy
John McCarthy	North Melbourne	Fitzroy

== 1992 national draft ==
=== Draft tampering ===
The 1992 draft suffered from three high-profile cases of draft tampering involving highly rated South Australian players: No. 6 selection Robert Pyman, No. 10 selection Brett Chalmers, and No. 13 selection Andrew McKay. Prior to the draft, all three players contacted AFL clubs which they did not want to play for, and told those clubs that they would remain in South Australia if drafted by them; at the time, the players could still play a respectable career and earn reasonable money in the SANFL, and would be tied to the AFL club that drafted them for only three years (after which they could re-enter the draft and be selected by another club), so they held a bargaining position to make these demands. However, this action was contrary to the rules, as it circumvented the fairness of the draft.

The most serious offence was by Chalmers, who had contacted most clubs in an effort to ensure that only Collingwood would draft him. He was fined $30,000, and was made ineligible to play for Collingwood for three years; he never played a senior game for Collingwood, but later played for Adelaide and Port Adelaide. McKay and Pyman, who had warned only the AFL's struggling clubs (Sydney, Brisbane Bears, Richmond and Fitzroy) against drafting them, but had not contrived to end up at a specific club, were fined only $10,000 and were permitted to continue playing for their new clubs. Brisbane Bears zone selection Nathan Buckley and the North Melbourne Football Club were also forced to defend accusations that they had come to a draft-tampering agreement for Buckley to later be traded to North Melbourne, but after a long and costly legal battle both parties were found not guilty.

=== Selections ===
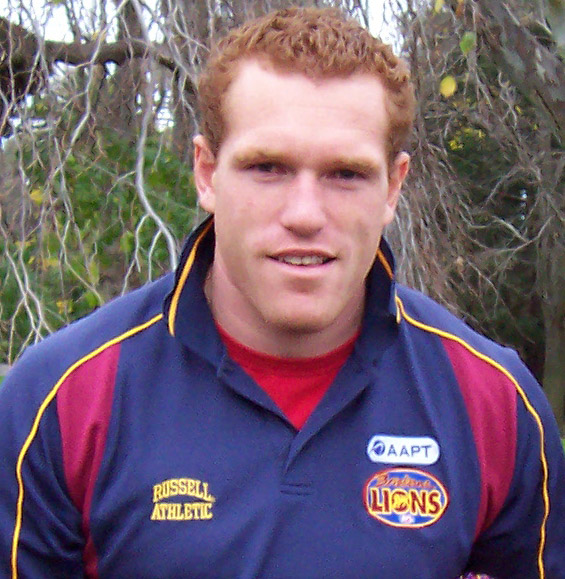
Justin Leppitsch was drafted by the Brisbane Bears with the number four pick.

Pick	Player	Recruited from	New club
1	Drew Banfield	Subiaco	West Coast
2	Nathan Chapman	Kangaroo Flat (VCFL)	Brisbane
3	Michael Prior	East Perth	Essendon
4	Justin Leppitsch	Southern (U18)	Brisbane
5	Jason Spinks	South Fremantle	Sydney
6	Robert Pyman	Woodville-West Torrens	North Melbourne
7	Wayne Hernaman	South Fremantle	Richmond
8	Paul Symmons	West Perth	West Coast
9	Martin Pike	Norwood	Melbourne
10	Brett Chalmers	Port Adelaide	Collingwood
11	Jonathon Robran	Norwood	Hawthorn
12	Tony Delaney	Claremont	Essendon
13	Andrew McKay	Glenelg	Carlton
14	Nick Holland	Nth Adelaide	Hawthorn
15	Damian Houlihan	Corowa (VCFL)	Collingwood
16	Brodie Atkinson	Nth Adelaide	St Kilda
17	Kym Koster	South Adelaide	Footscray
18	Leigh Colbert	South Bendigo (VCFL)	Geelong
19	Lee Walker	East Perth	West Coast
20	Scott Cummings	Swan Districts	Essendon
21	Shane Bond	Port Adelaide	West Coast
22	Mark Jones	Norwood	Richmond
23	Warren Campbell	South Fremantle	North Melbourne
24	Brett Jeffrey	Boort	Melbourne
25	John Barker	Northern (U18)	Fitzroy
26	Martin McKinnon	Central District	Adelaide
27	Kieran Murrihy	Geelong (U18)	Essendon
28	Jamie Tape	Woodville-West Torrens	Richmond
29	Sam Phillipou	Woodville-West Torrens	Footscray
30	Paul Ridley	Subiaco	Collingwood
31	Shane Wakelin	Port Adelaide	St Kilda
32	Peter Quill	East Fremantle	Footscray
33	Corey Robertson	Burnie Hawks	Geelong
34	Travis Burton	Subiaco	West Coast
35	Scott Robinson	Norwood	Sydney
36	Tim Sherman	Geelong (U18)	Brisbane
37	Matthew Rogers	South Adelaide	Richmond
38	David Deighton	Westbrook	North Melbourne
39	Matthew Kluzek	Woodville-West Torrens	Melbourne
40	Michael Dunstan	South Fremantle	Fitzroy
41	Brooke Fogden	West Adelaide	Adelaide
42	Che Cockatoo-Collins	Port Adelaide	Essendon
43	Adrian Whitehead	Wodonga (VCFL)	Carlton
44	Chris Gerreyn	Claremont	Hawthorn
45	Scott Thompson	Subiaco	Collingwood
46	Matthew Jackson	Centrals Dragons	St Kilda
47	Dillon Flavell	South Bendigo (VCFL)	Footscray
48	Andrew Osborn	South Adelaide	Geelong
49	Jarrad Schofield	Subiaco	West Coast
50	Andrew Donnelly	Subiaco	Sydney
51	Adam Williamson	Centrals Dragons	Brisbane
52	Paul Bulluss	Woodville-West Torrens	Richmond
53	Mathew Moon	Centrals Dragons	North Melbourne
54	Daniel Clark	West Brisbane	Melbourne
55	Matthew Capuano	Geelong (U18)	North Melbourne
56	Matthew Powell	South Adelaide	Adelaide
57	Russell Williams	South Fremantle	Essendon
58	Chris Peel	Swan Districts	Carlton
59	Scott Allen	Portarlington	Footscray
60	Tim Scott-Branagan	Centrals Dragons	Collingwood
61	Luke Raynor	Geelong (U18)	Carlton
62	Damien Ryan	Footscray	Footscray
63	Mathew McMurray	Perth	Geelong
64	Tony Godden	Subiaco	West Coast
65	Gerard Power	Northern (U18)	Geelong
66	Aaron Lord	Centrals Dragons	Brisbane
67	Brady Leckie	West Perth	Richmond
68	Travis Miller	Warragul	Fitzroy
69	Scott Simister	Springvale	Melbourne
70	Danny Morton	Nth Adelaide	Fitzroy
71	Mathew Aston	Geelong (U18)	Sydney
72	Mathew Wadewitz	South Adelaide	Essendon
73	Tony Plym	Golden Square	Carlton
74	Tim Hargreaves	Berrigan	Hawthorn
75	Chris Batka	Subiaco	Collingwood
76	Hugh Reimers	Central District	St Kilda
77	Brad Copeland	Western (U18)	Footscray
78	Damien Crowe	De La Salle	Geelong
79	Brett Spinks	South Fremantle	West Coast
80	Stephen Newport	Melbourne	St Kilda
81	Michael Murphy	Adelaide	Brisbane
82	Robert Schaefer	Sturt	Richmond
83	Jeremy Silcock	East Perth	North Melbourne
84	Damien Gaspar	South Fremantle	Melbourne
85	Tristan Lynch	Sale	Collingwood
86	Sam Smart	Norwood	Adelaide
87	Damien Hardwick	Springvale	Essendon
88	Troy Bond	Port Adelaide	Carlton
89	Hamish Stewart	Glenelg	Hawthorn
90	Scott Burns	Norwood	Collingwood
91	Jeremy McVay	Eastern (U18)	St Kilda
92	Daniel Southern	Claremont	Footscray
93	Adam Shanahan	South Bendigo	Geelong
94	Rhys Croxford	Claremont	West Coast
95	Scott Direen	New Norfolk	Sydney
96	Trent Mills	South Adelaide	Brisbane
97	John Howat	Melbourne	Richmond
98	Adrian McAdam	South Alice Springs	North Melbourne
99	Jeff Hilton	St Kilda	Melbourne
100	Troy Davies	Devonport	Fitzroy
101	Troy Hull	Port Adelaide	Sydney
102	Jason Bell	Red Cliffs	Essendon
103	Ben Harrison	Devonport	Carlton
104	Andrew Kemp	West Adelaide	Hawthorn
105	Julian Waite	Port Adelaide	Collingwood
106	Craig Treleven	East Fremantle	St Kilda
107	Gary Barrow	Footscray	Footscray
108	Bryan Beinke	Port Adelaide	Geelong
109	David Muir	Claremont	West Coast
110	Jeff Chandler	North Melbourne	North Melbourne
111	Michael Gaffney	Port Adelaide	Sydney
112	Ben Careless	Glenorchy	Richmond
113	Damon Armstrong	Moama	North Melbourne
114	Richard Marr	Central District	Fitzroy
115	Paul Whelan	Ainslie (ACT)	Footscray
116	Michael Godden	West Adelaide	Adelaide
117	Vince Cappadona	Geelong (U18)	Essendon
118	Scott Spalding	Perth	Carlton
119	Scott Morrison	St Kilda	St Kilda
120	Troy Olsen	Port Adelaide	Collingwood
121	Ben Ellinghaus	Melbourne Grammar	Hawthorn
122	Damon Munt	Norwood	Melbourne
123	Marty Christensen	North Melbourne	North Melbourne
124	Brayden Lyle	Port Adelaide	West Coast

== 1993 pre-season draft ==
Pick	Player	Recruited from	New club
1	Richard Osborne	Fitzroy	Sydney
2	Brendan McCormack	Fitzroy	Brisbane
3	Paul Bryce	Melbourne	Sydney
4	Adrian Fletcher	St Kilda	Brisbane
5	John Hutton	Brisbane	Sydney
6	Martin Heffernan	Geelong	Brisbane
7	Stuart Steele	Hawthorn U19s	Richmond
8	Greg Eppelstun	Footscray	North Melbourne
9	Glenn Freeborn	Woodville-West Torrens Football Club	Melbourne
10	Mark Zanotti	Brisbane	Fitzroy
11	Darryl Wakelin	Port Adelaide	Adelaide
12	Tim Watson	West Coast	Essendon
13	Andrew Leoncelli	Old Xaverians	Carlton
14	Robert Walker	Richmond	Hawthorn
15	Barry Mitchell	Sydney	Collingwood
16	Mark Arceri	Carlton	St Kilda
17	Anthony Darcy	Geelong	Footscray
18	Mathew McMartin	Colac	Geelong
19	Brendon Retzlaff	Brisbane	West Coast
20	Ben Doolan	Sydney	Essendon
21	Ryan Humphreys	Subiaco	Sydney
22	Craig McRae	Glenelg	Brisbane
23	Chris Bond	Carlton	Richmond
24	Paul Geister	Central District	North Melbourne
25	Ivan Bartul	Sth Fremantle	Melbourne
26	Adam Sheridan	St Mary's (NT)	Fitzroy
27	Josh Mail	North Adelaide	Adelaide
28	Lachlan Ross	West Adelaide	Essendon
29	Damien Sheehan	Port Adelaide	Carlton
30	Mark Bunn	Fitzroy	Hawthorn
31	Brett James	Norwood	Collingwood
32	Martin Heppell	Carey Grammar	St Kilda
33	Brad Nicholson	Eastern (U18)	Footscray
34	Shane Crothers	Grovedale (VCFL)	Geelong
35	Travis Edmonds	Hawthorn	West Coast
36	Darren Mead	Port Adelaide	Brisbane
37	Simon Verbeek	Carlton	Richmond
38	Brendan Bower	Essendon	North Melbourne
39	Mathew McKay	Melbourne	Melbourne
40	Brett Rowe	Nth Brisbane	Fitzroy
41	Nick Pesch	Woodville West Torrens Eagles	Adelaide
42	Brad Fox	Essendon	Essendon
43	Matthew Penny	Box Hill (VFA)	Carlton
44	Austin McCrabb	Hawthorn	Hawthorn
45	Kent Butcher	Geelong	Collingwood
46	Chris Hollow	Dandenong (VFA)	St Kilda
47	Craig Ellis	Western (U18)	Footscray
48	Mark Ballan	Geelong	Geelong
49	Brendon Green	Claremont	West Coast
50	Julien Waite	Port Adelaide	Brisbane
51	Simon Eishold	Melbourne	Richmond
52	Rodney McKay	North Melbourne	North Melbourne
53	Paul Prymke	SA Eagles	Melbourne
54	James Saywell	Central District	Fitzroy
55	Simon Pedler	Port Adelaide	Adelaide
56	Brendon Duncan	Western (U18)	Essendon
57	Chris O'Dwyer	Sydney	Carlton
58	Guy Rigoni	Myrtleford (VCFL)	Hawthorn
59	Jason Williams	Williamstown (VFA)	Collingwood
60	Darren Bourke	Dandenong (VFA)	St Kilda
61	Daniel Fletcher	Geelong (U18)	Geelong
62	John Klug	Adelaide	Brisbane
63	Tim Livingstone	Box Hill	Richmond
64	Darren Tarczon	Carlton	North Melbourne
65	Nick Mitchell	St Bernards	Fitzroy
66	Darren Bartsch	West Adelaide	Essendon
67	Kevin Holmes	Claremont	Carlton
68	Andrew Tranquilli	Marcellin	Collingwood
69	Leigh Capsalis	Keysborough (VMFL)	St Kilda
70	Shayne Breuer	SA Eagles	Geelong
71	Julian Burton	Port Adelaide	Brisbane
72	Adam Jones	Richmond	Richmond
73	Simon Farrer	Stawell (VCFL)	Fitzroy
74	Christian Davidson	Old Collegians	Carlton
75	Terry Board	Brisbane	Collingwood
76	Nick Hanson	Sandringham (VFA)	St Kilda
77	Damon Lukins	Claremont	Geelong
78	Danny Craven	St Kilda	Brisbane
79	Greg Wootton	South Fremantle	St Kilda
80	David Niemann	Woodville-West Torrens Eagles	St Kilda
81	Jason Mifsud	Mortlake (VCFL)	St Kilda
