= Spargo =

Spargo is a surname. Notable people with the surname include:

- Anna Spargo-Ryan, Australian author and scriptwriter
- Bob Spargo Sr. (1913–1994), Australian rules footballer
- Bob Spargo (born 1939), Australian rules footballer
- Charlie Spargo (born 1999), Australian rules footballer
- John Spargo (1876–1966), British political writer and socialist
- John Spargo (water polo) (born 1931), American water polo player
- John Warren Spargo, American electronic engineer
- Marty Spargo, Australian entrepreneur
- Mary Spargo (1904–1991), American newspaper journalist
- Paul Spargo (born 1966), Australian rules footballer
- Ricky Spargo (born 1947), Australian rules footballer
- R. Clifton Spargo (born 1965), American novelist
- Stephen Spargo (1903–1972), English footballer
- Thomas J. Spargo, American attorney and judge
- Tony Spargo, professional name of Tony Sbarbaro (1897–1969), American jazz drummer

== Fictional characters ==
- Harry Spargo and his wife Beryl, characters in the television series Upstairs Downstairs

== See also ==
- Spargo (band), a Dutch disco-funk-band
- Lower Spargo and Upper Spargo, hamlets in Cornwall, county in South West England
