= Strathmore Football Club =

Australian rules football club

Names
- Full name: Strathmore Football Club
- Nickname: 'Mores

2025 season
- After finals: Premiers
- Home-and-away season: 4th
- Leading goalkicker: Adam Winter (34 goals)

Club details
- Founded: 1954; 72 years ago
- Colours: Navy blue Gold
- Competition: Essendon District Football League
- Coach: Matt Horne
- Captain(s): Daniel Mighell and Brock Egglestone
- Premierships: 11 (1981, 1984, 1989, 1998, 2005, 2006, 2011, 2014, 2021, 2022, 2025)
- Ground: Seniors: Lebanon Reserve Juniors: Boeing Reserve
- Former ground: Raeburn Reserve
- Training ground: Lebanon Reserve

Other information
- Official website: strathmorefc.com.au

Strathmore Football Club, nicknamed the Mores, is an Australian rules football club based in the Melbourne suburb of Strathmore. The club competes in the Premier Division of the Essendon District Football League (EDFL).

Founded in 1954 as a junior club, Strathmore established its senior program in 1957 and has since become one of the EDFL's most successful and respected clubs.

Originally playing its home matches in nearby Pascoe Vale, the club later relocated to its current home at Lebanon Reserve, which serves as its headquarters, training base and seniors and women's match-day venue.

The club's colours are gold and navy blue, and it fields teams across senior men's, women's and junior competitions.

The club has won nine senior premierships, including a memorable 2011 A Grade premiership when it defeated rivals Oak Park by two points in a dramatic Grand Final. Entering the match as underdogs after a 37-point semi-final defeat, Strathmore overturned the odds to prevail 11.15 (81) to 11.13 (79).

In 2021, Strathmore was awarded its ninth senior premiership after finishing atop the EDFL Premier Division ladder when the season was curtailed due to the impacts of the COVID-19 pandemic.

== VFL/AFL players recruited from Strathmore ==
- Glenn Manton – Essendon and Carlton
- Andrew Horne – South Adelaide Panthers
- Steven Clark – Essendon, Melbourne and St Kilda
- Ed Considine – Essendon
- Mark Eustice – Essendon
- Darryl Gerlach – Essendon
- Geoff Gosper – Essendon
- Russell Muir – Essendon
- Michael Thomson – Essendon
- Ian Aitken – Carlton
- Jeff Chandler – North Melbourne
- Adam Contessa – Western Bulldogs
- Lance Picioane – North Melbourne and Hawthorn
- Scott West – Western Bulldogs
- Jackson Trengove – Port Adelaide
- Ryan O'Keefe – Sydney
- Brian Wilson – Collingwood
- James Polkinghorne – Brisbane Lions
- Andrew Johnston – Fitzroy Football Club
