= Tony Begovich =

Australian rules footballer

Personal information
- Full name: Anthony Michael Begovich
- Born: 7 August 1967 (age 59)
- Original team: Claremont
- Draft: 1989 VFL Post-draft
- Height: 180 cm (5 ft 11 in)
- Weight: 83 kg (183 lb)

Playing career^{1}
Years	Club	Games (Goals)
1990	West Coast Eagles	9 (2)
1993	Sydney Swans	5 (0)
Total		14 (2)
- ^{1} Playing statistics correct to the end of 1993.

Anthony Michael Begovich (born 7 August 1967) is a former Australian rules footballer who played with the West Coast Eagles and the Sydney Swans in the Australian Football League (AFL) during the early 1990s.

Begovich was selected by West Coast as a post-season pick in the 1989 VFL draft, from Claremont. He played nine times in the 1990 AFL season, including a semi final and preliminary final. A defender, he was hampered by injuries after his debut season and in the 1992 AFL draft was traded to Sydney along with Scott Watters, in return for the first pick of the draft, Drew Banfield.
