= Bob Spargo Sr. =

Australian rules footballer, born 1913

Bob Spargo

Personal information
- Full name: Robert Henry Spargo
- Born: 7 July 1913; South Dudley, Victoria
- Died: 14 May 1994 (aged 80); Wonthaggi, Victoria
- Original team: Riverside (FDFL)
- Height: 175 cm (5 ft 9 in)
- Weight: 69 kg (152 lb)

Playing career^{1}
Years	Club	Games (Goals)
1934–41	Footscray	65 (6)
1941	Williamstown (VFA)	9 (0)
1942	Melbourne	2 (0)
1941	Prahran (VFA)	19 (3)
Total		95 (9)
- ^{1} Playing statistics correct to the end of 1942.

Robert Henry Spargo (7 July 1913 – 14 May 1994) was an Australian rules footballer who played with Footscray and Melbourne in the Victorian Football League (VFL).

== Family ==
The son of Luke Spargo (1878-1944), and Rena Ann Spargo (1891-1980), née McHenry, Robert Henry Spargo was born at South Dudley, Victoria on 7 July 1913.

He married Dorothy Annie "Dot" White (1913–2016) in 1938. Spargo's two sons Bob Jr and Ricky also both played for Footscray Football Club. His grandson Paul played for North Melbourne and the Brisbane Bears and great-grandson Charlie plays for Melbourne Football Club.

== Football ==
As a schoolboy, he played for the Wonthaggi Technical School team, alongside Fred Backway and Bernie Guthrie.

=== Footscray (VFL) ===
Recruited from the Riverside Football Club in the Footscray Football League (FDFL), he played 65 senior games, and scored 6 goals, in his eight seasons with Footscray. During that time he also represented Victoria.

=== Essendon (VFL) ===
Having already begun training with Essendon, he was cleared from Footscray to Essendon on 5 June 1941. He played three matches for the Essendon Second XVIII (on 14 June, 21 June, and 27 June); and, without having played in the First XVIII, he applied for a clearance to Williamstown.

=== Williamstown (VFA) ===
Cleared from Essendon on 2 July 1941, he played his first match for Williamstown, against Yarraville, on 5 July 1941. He played in all of the 1941 season's remaining home-and-away: a total of 9 senior matches.

=== Melbourne (VFL) ===
Cleared from Williamstown on 13 May 1942, he played in two senior matches for Melbourne (16 May and 23 May 1942).

=== Prahran (VFA) ===
Cleared from Williamstown to Prahran on 11 April 1945, he played in the first 19 (of 20) home-and-away matches in the 1945 season. He injured his foot in the 1 September 1945 match against Brighton, and could not play in the last match of the season against Camberwell.

== Athlete ==
Employed as a fireman, Spargo was an accomplished professional athlete who was placed 3rd in both the 1936 and 1940 Stawell Gift finals. In 1936 he was 3rd off 9¾yds to Roy McCann and in 1940 he was 3rd off 8yds to Alex Reid.

== Death ==
He died at Wonthaggi, Victoria on 14 May 1994.
