= Mark Eustice =

Australian rules footballer

Personal information
- Full name: Mark Eustice
- Born: 14 February 1963 (age 63)
- Original team: Strathmore (EDFL)
- Height: 183 cm (6 ft 0 in)
- Weight: 84 kg (185 lb)

Playing career^{1}
Years	Club	Games (Goals)
1980–1984	Essendon	29 (19)
1985–1988	Richmond	62 (26)
1988–1991	Sydney Swans	46 (9)
Total		137 (54)
- ^{1} Playing statistics correct to the end of 1991.

Mark Eustice (born 14 February 1963) is a former Australian rules footballer who played with Essendon, Richmond and the Sydney Swans in the Victorian/Australian Football League (VFL/AFL).

Eustice, who played his first VFL game at just 17 years of age, never played more than nine games in a season while at Essendon. He was a member of the reserves premiership winning team of 1983 and played in Essendon's 1984 night premiership, but never participated in a VFL finals series. Used in a variety of positions, he often appeared as a wingman or half forward.

He received a clearance to Richmond for the 1985 season and found himself regularly selected for the seniors. He played 18 games that year and earned the first Brownlow Medal votes of his career when he kicked four goals in a win over Fitzroy. In 1986 he was Richmond's third leading disposal getter, averaging 20 a game. He made 18 appearances in 1987 and again found a lot of the ball, but it would be his last completed season at Richmond. Eight rounds into the 1988 season and after serving a two-week suspension for headbutting former teammate Steven Clark, Eustice was sacked by Richmond. He completed the season with Sydney, playing five games.

At Sydney he played mostly as a back pocket defender and appeared in the opening 20 rounds of the 1989 season before a broken jaw ended his year. He spent two further years with the Swans before being delisted but remained in the city and played for North Shore in the Sydney Football League.

He was the subject of media attention in 2010 when he revealed that he had undergone rehabilitation for long term drug abuse and was suffering from bipolar depression.
