= Eppelstun =

Eppelstun is a surname. Notable people with the surname include:

- Greg Eppelstun (born 1966), Australian rules footballer
- Michael Eppelstun, Australian bodyboarder
