= Stuart Steele =

Australian rules footballer

Personal information
- Full name: Stuart Steele
- Born: 28 March 1972 (age 54)
- Original team: Scotch College
- Draft: 1. 7, 1993 Pre-season draft

Playing career^{1}
Years	Club	Games (Goals)
1993	Richmond	2 (0)
- ^{1} Playing statistics correct to the end of 1993.

Stuart Steele (born 28 March 1972) is a former Australian rules footballer who played for Richmond in the Australian Football League (AFL) in 1993. He was recruited from the Hawthorn reserves team, with the 7th selection in the 1993 pre-season draft. He attended Scotch College, Melbourne as did his grandfather, Ray Steele, who also played for Richmond.
