= Paul Symmons =

Australian rules footballer (born 1973)

Personal information
- Full name: Paul Symmons
- Born: 2 September 1973 (age 53)
- Original team: West Perth
- Height: 189 cm (6 ft 2 in)
- Weight: 87 kg (192 lb)

Playing career^{1}
Years	Club	Games (Goals)
1994–2000	West Coast	99 (36)
2001–05	East Perth	83 (39)
- ^{1} Playing statistics correct to the end of 2005.

Paul Symmons (born 2 September 1973) is a former Australian rules footballer who played for the West Coast Eagles in the Australian Football League (AFL).

Symmons was picked up by West Coast with pick eight in the 1992 AFL draft, which they had received after trading Dean Laidley to North Melbourne. He played initially at West Perth and in 1994 won a Simpson Medal when he represented Western Australia in an interstate match against South Australia. In the same year, a premiership season for West Coast, Symmons made four appearances.

After being plagued by a shoulder problem in 1996, Symmons finished third in West Coast's Club Champion award the following season and polled three Brownlow Medal votes in successive games early in the year. He played his fifth final in 1998 but he was struggling for form and was delisted at the end of the 2000 AFL season.

A flanker, Symmons continued his career at East Perth and was a member of their 2001 and 2002 premiership teams.
