= Russell Williams (footballer) =

Australian rules footballer

Personal information
- Full name: Russell Williams
- Born: 20 January 1974 (age 52)
- Original team: South Fremantle
- Draft: 57th, 1992 AFL draft
- Height: 175 cm (5 ft 9 in)
- Weight: 77 kg (170 lb)

Playing career^{1}
| Years | Club | Games (Goals) |
| 1994 | Essendon | 3 (1) |
- ^{1} Playing statistics correct to the end of 1994.

Russell Williams (born 20 January 1974) is a former Australian rules footballer who played with Essendon in the Australian Football League (AFL).

Williams, an Indigenous Australian from South Fremantle, played his football as a rover. He made three appearances for reigning premiers Essendon in the 1994 AFL season and then returned to Western Australia, having been unable to settle in Melbourne.
