= Daniel Fletcher =

Australian rules footballer

- Fletcher coaching St Mary's

Personal information
- Full name: Daniel Fletcher
- Born: 16 August 1974
- Died: 4 October 2015 (aged 41); Lorne, Victoria
- Original teams: Geelong Falcons, (TAC Cup)
- Draft: No. 61, 1993 Pre-season Draft

Playing career^{1}
Years	Club	Games (Goals)
1994	Geelong	1 (0)
- ^{1} Playing statistics correct to the end of 1994.

Daniel Fletcher (16 August 1974 – 4 October 2015) was an Australian rules footballer who played for Geelong in the Australian Football League (AFL) in 1994. He was recruited from the Geelong Falcons in the TAC Cup with the 61st selection in the 1993 Pre-season Draft. His brother Simon Fletcher also played in the AFL, for Carlton.

Following his delisting by Geelong, Fletcher coached St Mary's in the Geelong Football League (GFL) from 2007 to 2011, taking them to a Premiership in 2008.

Fletcher was found dead in Lorne, Victoria in October 2015 aged 41, after apparently having fallen from an embankment.
