= Scott Allen (footballer) =

Australian rules footballer

Personal information
- Full name: Scott Allen
- Born: 30 January 1975 (age 51)
- Original team: Portarlington
- Draft: No. 59, 1992 National Draft
- Height: 182 cm (6 ft 0 in)
- Weight: 84 kg (185 lb)

Playing career^{1}
Years	Club	Games (Goals)
1994–1997	Footscray	15 (8)
- ^{1} Playing statistics correct to the end of 1997.

Scott Allen (born 30 January 1975) is a former Australian rules footballer who played with Footscray in the Australian Football League (AFL).

A utility, Allen was selected with pick 59 in the 1992 National Draft, from Portarlington. He appeared in just 15 senior games for Footscray but played finals football in each of his first two seasons.

Allen would later play for the Clarence Football Club in the Tasmanian Football League.
