= Lachlan Ross =

Australian rules footballer

Personal information
- Born: 12 August 1973 (age 53)
- Original team: West Adelaide (SANFL)
- Debut: Round 14, 1994, Essendon vs. Sydney, at MCG
- Height: 170 cm (5 ft 7 in)
- Weight: 74 kg (11 st 9 lb; 163 lb)

Playing career^{1}
Years	Club	Games (Goals)
1994	Essendon	2 (1)
- ^{1} Playing statistics correct to the end of 1994.

Lachlan Ross (born 12 August 1973) is a former Australian rules footballer who played with Essendon in the Australian Football League (AFL) and West Adelaide in the South Australian National Football League (SANFL). Ross was drafted by Essendon with pick #28 in the 1993 pre-season draft. He made his senior debut in 1994 against Sydney Swans, kicking a goal with his first kick.
