= Mark Attard =

Australian rules footballer

Personal information
- Full name: Mark Attard
- Born: 29 July 1974 (age 52)
- Original team: Eastern U18 (TAC Cup)
- Draft: No. 19, 1992 Mid-Season Draft

Playing career^{1}
| Years | Club | Games (Goals) |
| 1992 | North Melbourne | 3 (2) |
- ^{1} Playing statistics correct to the end of 1992.

Mark Attard (born 29 July 1974) is a former Australian rules footballer who played for North Melbourne in the Australian Football League (AFL) in 1992. He was recruited from the Eastern Ranges in the TAC Cup with the 19th selection in the 1992 Mid-Season Draft.
