= Sam Phillipou =

Australian rules footballer (born 1974)

Personal information
- Full name: Sam Phillipou
- Born: 18 September 1974 (age 52)
- Original teams: Woodville-West Torrens, (SANFL)
- Draft: No. 29, 1992 AFL draft

Playing career^{1}
Years	Club	Games (Goals)
1995	Footscray	3 (3)
- ^{1} Playing statistics correct to the end of 1995.

Sam Phillipou (born 18 September 1974) is a former Australian rules footballer who played for Footscray in the Australian Football League (AFL) in 1995. He was recruited from the Woodville-West Torrens Football Club in the South Australian National Football League (SANFL) with the 29th selection in the 1992 AFL draft. He played in South Australia for two years, before signing a two-year contract with Footscray at the end of the 1994 season. However, he was delisted at the end of the 1995 season, and returned to South Australia.

== Personal life ==
Phillipou's son Mattaes currently plays for St Kilda.
