= Ben Harrison (Australian footballer) =

Australian rules footballer (born 1975)

Personal information
- Full name: Ben Harrison
- Born: 17 January 1975 (age 51)
- Original team: Devonport (TFL Statewide)
- Draft: 103rd, 1992 AFL draft
- Height: 191 cm (6 ft 3 in)
- Weight: 96 kg (212 lb)

Playing career^{1}
Years	Club	Games (Goals)
1995	Carlton	2 (0)
1996–2000	Richmond	74 (39)
2001–2005	Western Bulldogs	85 (32)
Total		161 (71)
- ^{1} Playing statistics correct to the end of 2005.

Ben Harrison (born 17 January 1975) is a former Australian rules footballer who played with Carlton, Richmond and the Western Bulldogs in the Australian Football League (AFL).

A Tasmanian, Harrison was just 17 when he was picked up by Carlton in the 1992 AFL draft. He served a long apprenticeship before finally making his senior debut in 1995. His two games in 1995 were the only times he was able to break into the Carlton side, with the club forming such a strong 21 that they would go on to win the premiership that year. After taking home the reserve's "Best and Fairest" award in 1995, he joined his childhood friend Matthew Richardson at Richmond for the 1996 season, having been traded for Justin Murphy.

He only played eight games in his first season with Richmond but was a regular member of the team in 1997. In the final round of the home and away season, Harrison kicked the winning goal in a two-point win over Carlton. The result meant that his former club would miss the finals for the first time since 1992 and it would be the last game that their captain Stephen Kernahan played in the AFL. During both the 1997 and 1998 seasons, Harrison spent some time up forward and kicked four goals on three occasions. He was however primarily a key defender, also used as a half back flanker and on the wing.

One of only three Richmond footballers to play in all 22 games in 1998, Harrison had perhaps his best league season. He took 114 marks, the second most by a player from his club, kicked 15 goals and averaged just under 19 disposals a game. Harrison also secured five Brownlow Medal votes and finished fourth in the Jack Dyer Medal count.

In 1999 he was restricted by a hamstring injuries and didn't play until round nine, but then didn't miss a game for the rest of the year. He added another 14 games the following season and was then on the trading table once again, swapped to the Western Bulldogs for the 41st pick of the 2000 AFL draft, which was used on Andrew Krakouer. He played 82 of a possible 88 games from 2001 to 2004. A knee injury kept him out of the seniors for much of 2005 and he retired at the end of the year. He never got to play finals football during his league career but participated in the 2005 VFL Grand Final with Werribee.
