= Jeff Hilton =

Australian rules footballer (1972–2023)

Personal information
- Full name: Jeffrey Hilton
- Born: 27 May 1972
- Died: 6 August 2023 (aged 51)
- Original team: Dromana
- Height: 183 cm (6 ft 0 in)
- Weight: 87 kg (192 lb)

Playing career^{1}
Years	Club	Games (Goals)
1991–1992	St Kilda	6 (6)
1993–1996	Melbourne	43 (23)
Total		49 (29)
- ^{1} Playing statistics correct to the end of 1996.

Jeffrey Paul Hilton (27 May 1972 – 6 August 2023) was an Australian rules footballer who played with St Kilda and Melbourne in the Australian Football League (AFL).

Hilton was a utility player, recruited to St Kilda from Dromana. He only managed to break into the seniors at St Kilda six times and switched clubs in the 1992 National Draft, selected by Melbourne at pick 99.

In his first season with Melbourne he was restricted to the reserves and was a member of their premiership team. He was, however, regularly selected in 1994, making 19 appearances, three of them in finals. In 1995 he also played 19 games but he added just five more games in 1996 and was delisted.

Hilton went to Western Australian club Peel Thunder in 1997.

Jeff Hilton died on 6 August 2023, at the age of 51.
