= John Parker (Australian footballer) =

Australian rules footballer

Personal information
- Full name: John Parker
- Born: 17 May 1971 (age 55)
- Original team: Frankston Bombers (MPFL)
- Height: 185 cm (6 ft 1 in)
- Weight: 89 kg (196 lb)

Playing career^{1}
Years	Club	Games (Goals)
1993	Brisbane Bears	3 (0)
- ^{1} Playing statistics correct to the end of 1993.

John Parker (born 17 May 1971) is a former Australian rules footballer who played with the Brisbane Bears in the Australian Football League (AFL).

Originally from Mornington Peninsula Football League (MPFL) club Frankston Bombers, Parker was chosen by the Bears with the first pick of the 1992 Mid-Season Draft.

Parker didn't play a senior game that year and instead made his debut during the 1993 season, against Carlton at Princes Park.

The following week he played again, this time a home fixture against North Melbourne and he had 11 disposals.

Parker's only other appearance came in a 104-point loss to Fitzroy.
