= Robert Walker (Australian footballer) =

Australian rules footballer

Personal information
- Full name: Robert Walker
- Born: 20 March 1970 (age 56)
- Original team: De La Salle College
- Height: 188 cm (6 ft 2 in)
- Weight: 87 kg (192 lb)

Playing career^{1}
Years	Club	Games (Goals)
1990–1992	Richmond	5 (0)
- ^{1} Playing statistics correct to the end of 1992.

Robert Walker (born 20 March 1970) is a former Australian rules footballer who played with Richmond in the Australian Football League (AFL).

Walker, recruited from De La Salle College, played five senior AFL games, over three seasons at Richmond. He went to Hawthorn in the 1993 Pre-Season Draft but didn't make any league appearances for the club.
