= Paul Prymke =

Australian rules footballer

Personal information
- Full name: Paul Prymke
- Born: 8 December 1970 (age 55)
- Original teams: Mildura, Woodville-West Torrens
- Draft: No. 53, 1993 Pre-season Draft
- Height: 194 cm (6 ft 4 in)
- Weight: 98 kg (216 lb)

Playing career^{1}
Years	Club	Games (Goals)
1993–1996	Melbourne	49 (2)
- ^{1} Playing statistics correct to the end of 1996.

Career highlights
- Harold Ball Memorial Trophy: 1994

Paul Prymke (born 8 December 1970) is a former Australian rules footballer who played with Melbourne in the Australian Football League (AFL).

Prymke, was recruited from Woodville-West Torrens, but came from Mildura. He was selected by Melbourne with pick 53 of the 1993 Pre-season Draft. In 1994 he played 24 league games, three of them finals, followed by another 21 the following year. A centre half-back, Prymke won Melbourne's "Best First Year Player" award in 1994 and was third in their 1995 best and fairest. He retired prematurely due to a back injury.
