= Dean McRae =

Australian rules footballer

Personal information
- Full name: Dean McRae
- Born: 12 November 1968 (age 57)
- Original team: Sandgate (QAFL)
- Height: 186 cm (6 ft 1 in)
- Weight: 90 kg (198 lb)

Playing career^{1}
Years	Club	Games (Goals)
1987–1992	North Melbourne	81 (25)
1993–1996	Sydney Swans	60 (30)
Total		141 (55)
- ^{1} Playing statistics correct to the end of 1996.

Dean McRae (born 12 November 1968) is a former Australian rules footballer who played with North Melbourne and the Sydney Swans in the Victorian/Australian Football League (VFL/AFL).

Recruited from Queensland Australian Football League (QAFL) club Sandgate; McRae's family had moved to Bribie Island from Victoria in the late 1980s. Debuting in 1987, McRae played 81 games in six seasons for North Melbourne.

Prior to the 1992 National Draft, North Melbourne traded McRae to Sydney in return for the 110th selection of the draft, which they used to redraft Jeff Chandler.

McRae averaged 16 disposals a game from his 18 appearances for the Swans in 1993. After another solid season in 1994, McRae was the fifth leading disposal getter at the club in 1995. He lost his place in the Sydney team early in the 1996 AFL season and took no further part in their run to the Grand Final, where they would be defeated by McRae's former club.
