= Mattaes Phillipou =

Australian rules football player

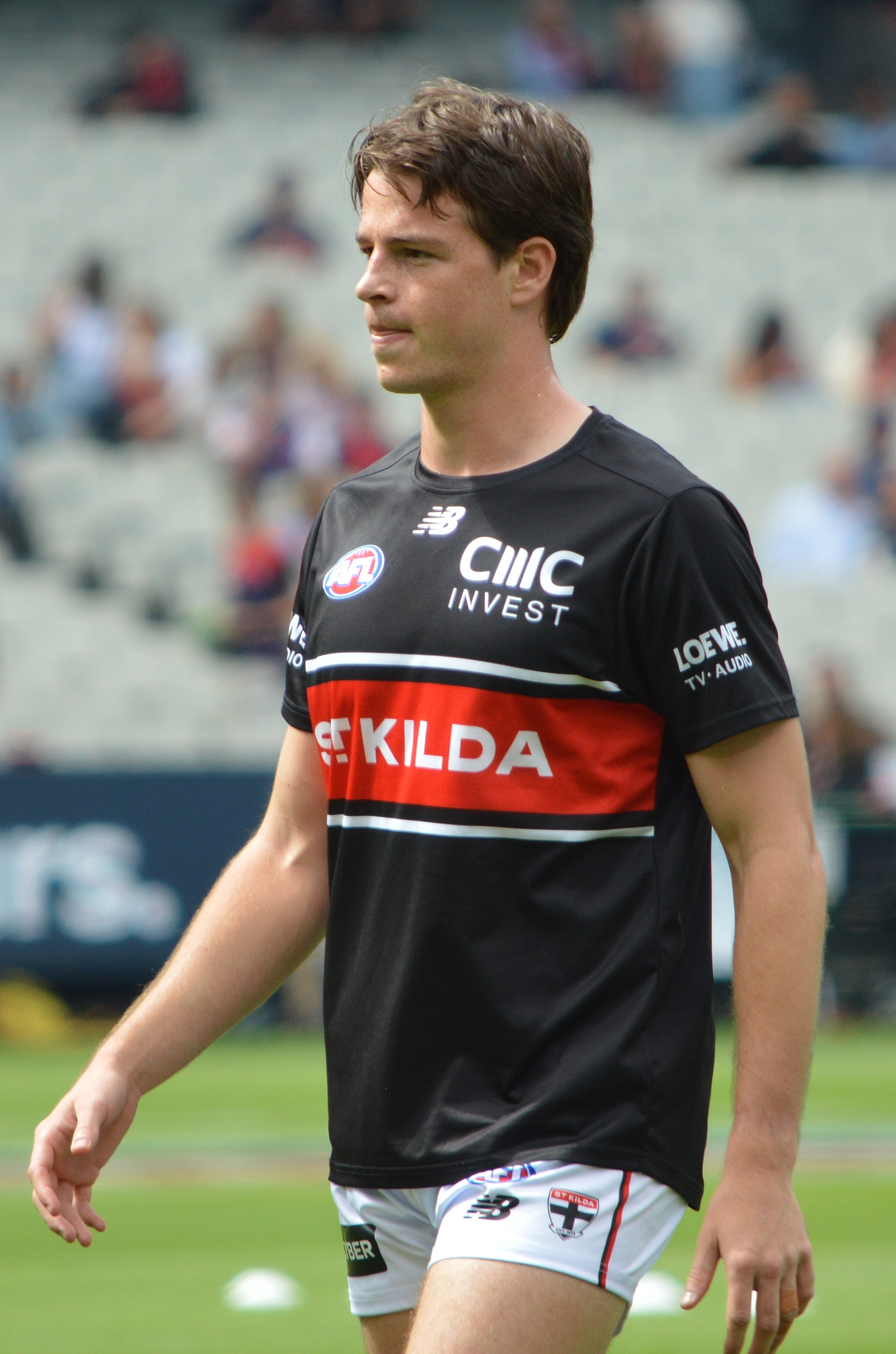
- Phillipou in March 2026

Personal information
- Full name: Mattaes Phillipou
- Born: 27 December 2004 (age 21)
- Original teams: PHOS Camden Football Club (Adelaide Footy League); Woodville-West Torrens Football Club (SANFL)
- Draft: No. 10, 2022 AFL draft
- Debut: Round 1, 2023, St Kilda vs. Fremantle, at Marvel Stadium
- Height: 190 cm (6 ft 3 in)
- Weight: 88 kg (194 lb)
- Position: Midfielder/Forward

Club information
- Current club: St Kilda
- Number: 25

Playing career^{1}
Years	Club	Games (Goals)
2023–	St Kilda	63 (35)
- ^{1} Playing statistics correct to the end of round 22, 2026.

Career highlights
- AFL Rising Star nominee: 2023

Mattaes Phillipou (born 27 December 2004) is a professional Australian rules footballer playing for the St Kilda Football Club in the Australian Football League (AFL). He was drafted by St Kilda with their first pick in the 2022 AFL draft, pick 10 overall.

== Early football career ==
Phillipou is the son of former AFL player Sam Phillipou, who played three games for the Western Bulldogs in 1995.

Phillipou generated plentiful excitement in his draft year, averaging 28 disposals and 1.5 goals in the SANFL under 18s competition. In the lead-up to the 2022 AFL draft, he was forecast to be taken by either Essendon or St Kilda in the first round.

== AFL career ==
Phillipou was taken by St Kilda with pick 10 in the 2022 AFL draft after Essendon instead opted to take Elijah Tsatas.

Phillipou made his AFL debut in Round 1 of the 2023 AFL season against Fremantle, where he gathered 16 disposals and kicked one goal. In Round 2, he scored 3 goals in a win over the Western Bulldogs. He was nominated for the AFL Rising Star in Round 8 against North Melbourne. Phillipou went on to play every match in his debut season, including the Elimination Final.

== Statistics ==
Updated to the end of round 22, 2026.

Legend
G	Goals	K	Kicks	D	Disposals	T	Tackles
B	Behinds	H	Handballs	M	Marks

Season	Team	No.	Games	Totals							Averages (per game)							Votes
Season	Team	No.	Games	G	B	K	H	D	M	T	G	B	K	H	D	M	T	Votes
2023	St Kilda	25	24	13	8	124	180	304	69	54	0.5	0.3	5.2	7.5	12.7	2.9	2.3	1
2024	St Kilda	25	13	8	8	107	80	187	38	48	0.6	0.6	8.2	6.2	14.4	2.9	3.7	0
2025	St Kilda	25	7	4	3	30	30	60	11	12	0.6	0.4	4.3	4.3	8.6	1.6	1.7	0
2026	St Kilda	25	19	10	14	144	181	325	64	65	0.5	0.7	7.6	9.5	17.1	3.4	3.4	0
Career			63	35	33	405	471	876	182	179	0.6	0.5	6.4	7.5	13.9	2.9	2.8	1
