= Josh Mail =

Australian rules footballer (1974–2025)

Personal information
- Full name: Joshua Michael Mail
- Born: 18 December 1974; Adelaide, South Australia
- Died: 3 February 2025 (aged 50); Moonta Bay, South Australia
- Original team: North Adelaide
- Draft: 27th, 1993 pre-season draft
- Height: 172 cm (5 ft 8 in)
- Weight: 80 kg (12 st 8 lb; 176 lb)

Playing career
Years	Club	Games (Goals)
1994	Adelaide	4 (0)

Joshua Michael Mail (18 December 1974 – 3 February 2025) was an Australian rules footballer who played with the Adelaide Crows in the Australian Football League (AFL).

== Biography ==
Mail was born in Adelaide, South Australia, and attended Northfield Primary and Northfield High schools. He spent his junior football days playing for his local footy club, South Australian Amateur Football League (SAAFL) club Gepps Cross before his recruitment by South Australian National Football League (SANFL) club North Adelaide.

Mail was graded by the Roosters at the age of just 15, playing him in the reserves. He would go on to make his senior SANFL debut in 1991 aged 16 years and 95 days, becoming the seventh youngest footballer in SANFL history.

A South Australian Teal Cup representative under the coaching of four-time Magarey Medallist and SANFL legend Russell Ebert, Mail played as a rover, forward and defender and was selected by Adelaide at #27 in the 1993 pre-season draft.

Mail made his AFL debut against Fitzroy at Football Park in round 10 of the 1994 AFL season and marked an impressive debut with 11 kicks, 5 marks and 4 handballs. He went on to play in the next three games for the Crows during the season but couldn't cement his place in the side, instead playing most of the season with North Adelaide.

Mail died from cancer on 3 February 2025 in Moonta Bay, at the age of 50.
