= Robert Pyman =

Australian rules footballer and coach

Personal information
- Full name: Robert Pyman
- Born: 6 October 1971 (age 55)
- Original team: Woodville-West Torrens (SANFL)
- Height: 180 cm (5 ft 11 in)
- Weight: 79 kg (174 lb)
- Position: Utility

Playing career^{1}
Years	Club	Games (Goals)
1993–95	North Melbourne	16 (8)
1996	Collingwood	5 (1)
1997	Melbourne	19 (8)
Total		40 (17)
- ^{1} Playing statistics correct to the end of 1997.

Career highlights
- Joseph Wren Memorial Trophy 1996

Robert Pyman (born 6 October 1971) is a former Australian rules footballer who played for North Melbourne, Collingwood and Melbourne in the Australian Football League (AFL) during the 1990s.

== Career ==
=== AFL ===
A Woodville-West Torrens 'best and fairest' winner in 1992, Pyman was secured by North Melbourne with the sixth pick of that year's draft, which they received after trading Paul Spargo to Brisbane – although Pyman was later personally fined $10,000 when it emerged that he had contacted some of the league's struggling clubs and warned them that he would stay in South Australia if one of those clubs drafted him, which contravened the AFL's draft tampering rules. He nevertheless remained eligible to play for North Melbourne, and took part in the 1993 AFL finals series. However, he managed only five senior appearances over the following two seasons and instead spent the majority of his time in the reserves.

In 1996 he crossed to Collingwood but again struggled to play senior football, despite winning the Joseph Wren Memorial Trophy as the best and fairest of the reserves. Pyman's final port of call was Melbourne and for the first time in his career he was a regular in the AFL, playing 19 of a possible 22 games. He received the only Brownlow votes of his career in the same season when he was adjudged 'best on ground' in a loss to Sydney at the SCG, for getting 18 kicks and eight handballs.

=== SANFL ===
Pyman resumed at Woodville-West Torrens in 1998 and topped their goal-kicking with 33 goals. He then turned to coaching and was an assistant to Dean Laidley at North Melbourne before becoming South Adelaide's coach in 2004. Pyman steered the SANFL club to fourth position in his third year but after a string of poor performances was sacked and replaced by former Geelong player Gary Cameron late in the 2007 season. He has since lodged a civil claim against South Adelaide for unfair dismissal.
