= Chris Bond (footballer) =

Australian rules footballer (born 1969)

Personal information
- Born: 26 January 1969 (age 57); Wynyard, Tasmania
- Original team: North Hobart (TFL)

Playing career^{1}
Years	Club	Games (Goals)
1990–1992	Carlton	22 (8)
1993–1997	Richmond	100 (32)
1998–1999	Fremantle	41 (5)
Total		163 (45)

Coaching career
Years	Club	Games (W–L–D)
2001–2002	Werribee (VFL)	45 (37–8–0)
- ^{1} Playing statistics correct to the end of 1999.

Career highlights
- Richmond Best and Fairest 1994; Fremantle captain 1999

Chris Bond (born 26 January 1969) is a former Australian rules footballer who played as a rover for the Carlton, Richmond and Fremantle Football Clubs in the Australian Football League (AFL). Since retiring as a player he has coached Werribee in the Victorian Football League (VFL) and has also been an assistant coach for the Western Bulldogs. He is currently the football operations manager at Fremantle.

== Carlton ==
Bond was selected in the 1989 VFL draft from the North Hobart Football Club and played his first senior AFL game at Carlton in 1990, but after three seasons, had only played 22 games. Ready to turn his back on the AFL, Bond signed with the Central District of the South Australian National Football League (SANFL). However, a friend and teammate at Carlton, Ian Herman, persuaded Bond to change his plans and join the Richmond Football Club.

== Richmond ==
In 1994, Bond won the Richmond Best and Fairest award. Through 1997, Bond missed only one game.

== Fremantle ==
At the end of the 1997 season, Bond was traded to Fremantle in exchange for an early draft pick. Bond's experience and reliability was a major attraction for Fremantle – facing the 1998 AFL season without the retiring Ben Allan and Scott Watters and a coach in Gerard Neesham on a one-year performance based contract extension.

Bond played two years for Fremantle, the second as captain of the team. After nine games in a row of losing to crosstown rivals West Coast Eagles, Bond led the team to their first Western Derby victory. Bond was dumped as captain at the end of 1999 and also de-listed after a lackluster season.

== Coaching career ==
After the 1999 season, Bond took a coaching job in Victoria with the Werribee Tigers, a VFL-affiliate of the Western Bulldogs. After winning the 2002 VFL finals, he was promoted to a coaching position with the Western Bulldogs, where he assisted head coach Rodney Eade. He left the Bulldogs after the 2007 AFL season to take a management role at Fremantle.
