= Marty Spargo =

Australian entrepreneur and content creator

- Education: University of Wollongong
- Occupations: Entrepreneur and content creator Former pilot for Qantas
- Known for: Founder of REIZE; Smart home content at both automatelife.net and automatedhome.com

Marty Spargo is an Australian entrepreneur and content creator. He holds a Commerce degree from the University of Wollongong, an Airline Transport Pilot’s License, and owns several businesses.

== Career ==
Marty was a pilot for Qantas in Australia, flying the A330 aircraft as a Second Officer on medium-haul routes to and from Australia.

He later switched careers and became a derivates trader where he traded options and futures on the Japanese government bond and stock market, Nikkei 225.

After retiring from trading, Marty had a sabbatical before launching his own energy drink brand, REIZE.

In 2018, he moved to Malaysia.

In 2023, Marty became involved in smart homes as both the Business Development Manager of automatelife.net and as the owner of automatedhome.com.
