= Peter Quill (footballer) =

Australian rules footballer

Personal information
- Full name: Peter Alan Quill
- Born: 23 August 1969 (age 57)
- Original team: East Fremantle (WAFL)
- Draft: No. 32, 1992 National Draft
- Height: 182 cm (6 ft 0 in)
- Weight: 84 kg (185 lb)

Playing career^{1}
Years	Club	Games (Goals)
1993–1997	Footscray	67 (20)
- ^{1} Playing statistics correct to the end of 1997.

Peter Alan Quill (born 23 August 1969) is a former Australian rules footballer who played with Footscray in the Australian Football League (AFL) and East Fremantle in the West Australian Football League (WAFL).

Originally from Thornlie in Perth, Quill made his senior WAFL debut for East Fremantle in 1988. a half forward flanker, Quill played 78 games for East Fremantle and was a member of their 1992 premiership team.

Footscray selected Quill with pick 32 in the 1992 National Draft and he would play five seasons with the club.
