= Darren Bourke =

Australian rules footballer

Personal information
- Full name: Darren Bourke
- Born: 25 March 1970 (age 56)
- Original team: Dandenong (VFL)
- Draft: No. 60, 1993 Pre-season Draft
- Height: 180 cm (5 ft 11 in)
- Weight: 84 kg (185 lb)

Playing career^{1}
Years	Club	Games (Goals)
1993–1996	St Kilda	32 (9)
- ^{1} Playing statistics correct to the end of 1996.

Darren Bourke (born 25 March 1970) is a former Australian rules footballer who played with St Kilda in the Australian Football League (AFL).

Bourke appeared in under-19s and reserves football for Melbourne in the late 1980s. His father, Barry Bourke, had played for the club.

St Kilda selected him at pick 60 in the 1993 Pre-season Draft, from Victorian Football League (VFL) club Dandenong. A midfielder, Bourke averaged 20 disposals a game in his debut season, from his 14 appearances. He earned the maximum three Brownlow Medal votes in just his third game, against the Sydney Swans at Waverley Park.
