= Ray Baxter =

Australian rules footballer (1940–2024)

Personal information
- Born: 24 February 1940
- Died: 11 November 2024 (aged 84)
- Original team: Kingsville
- Height: 188 cm (6 ft 2 in)
- Weight: 79 kg (174 lb)

Playing career^{1}
Years	Club	Games (Goals)
1958–1964	Footscray	80 (120)
- ^{1} Playing statistics correct to the end of 1964.

Ray Baxter (24 February 1940 – 11 November 2024) was an Australian rules footballer who played with Footscray in the Victorian Football League (VFL)

== Biography ==
Recruited locally from Kingsville, Baxter was a follower and key position player. He topped Footscray's goal-kicking in the 1959 VFL season, with 35 goals, six of which came in a loss to Essendon at Windy Hill. His efforts were rewarded with selection in the Victorian team which played Tasmania.

Baxter was the club's leading goal-kicker again in 1960, managing 37 goals, the seventh-biggest tally in the league that season. Playing as a centre half-back, Baxter was a member of the Footscray team which won the 1963 Night Premiership.

Following his departure from Footscray, Baxter served as Captain/ Coach of Victorian Football Association (VFA) club Mordialloc from 1965 to 1967. He was awarded Best & Fairest in both 1965 & 1966.

Baxter was successful in his career after football, being employed by Mazda in 1963, and becoming general manager by 1979. In 1987, he brought the Lease Plan to Australia as the Managing Director. Baxter was appointed Lease Plan Chairman for Australia & New Zealand in 1997, he held this position until his retirement in 2002.

Baxter continued working with Footscray (eventually the Western Bulldogs). He was Vice President of the Western Bulldogs Board from 1996 to 2001, a Director of the Forever Foundation and Chairman and Trustee of the Western Bulldogs Society (Bequests).

In 2010, following the breakdown of his son’s marriage, he brought legal proceedings against his former daughter in law, Dr Susan White, and his own son. The allegation brought was that he had loaned money to his son and his daughter in law. Despite being sued, his son never defended the case and gave evidence on behalf of his father. The judge decided that the evidence of his son, Darren Baxter, should be "treated with some care". The Court concluded that Mr Baxter's evidence was "vague and confusing" and "unsatisfactory". The claim against Dr White was dismissed. Baxter v Baxter [2010] VCC 0203. https://austlii.edu.au/au/cases/vic/VCC/2010/203.pdf

Baxter died on 11 November 2024, at the age of 84. Darren Baxter, his son, would also play for Footscray.
