= Kent Butcher =

Australian rules footballer

Personal information
- Full name: Kent Butcher
- Born: 5 November 1973 (age 52)
- Original team: Grovedale/Geelong
- Draft: 45th, 1993 Pre-Season draft
- Height: 180 cm (5 ft 11 in)
- Weight: 82 kg (181 lb)

Playing career^{1}
| Years | Club | Games (Goals) |
| 1993–1995 | Collingwood | 22 (3) |
| 1996 | Sydney Swans | 0 (0) |
- ^{1} Playing statistics correct to the end of 1996.

Career highlights
- Harry Collier Trophy 1993; 1994 AFL Rising Star nominee

Kent Butcher (born 5 November 1973) is a former Australian rules footballer who played with Collingwood in the Australian Football League (AFL).

Butcher played both under-19s and reserves football for Geelong, but it was at Collingwood that he started his AFL career. In round eight of the 1994 season, the rebounding defender would receive a Rising Star nomination for his 20 disposal game against St Kilda on the Melbourne Cricket Ground.

An injury brought an end to his time at Collingwood and he was delisted, and was picked up by the Sydney Swans with the seventh selection of the 1996 Pre-season draft. He didn't play a senior AFL game for the Swans.

Butcher, a former Grovedale player, would move back to Geelong, where he played and coached.
