= Matthew Powell (Australian footballer) =

Australian rules footballer

Personal information
- Full name: Matthew Powell
- Born: 27 September 1973 (age 53)
- Original team: South Adelaide
- Draft: 56th, 1992 AFL draft
- Height: 175 cm (5 ft 9 in)
- Weight: 87 kg (192 lb)

Playing career^{1}
Years	Club	Games (Goals)
1993–1995	Adelaide	16 (4)
- ^{1} Playing statistics correct to the end of 1995.

Matthew Powell (born 27 September 1973) is a former Australian rules footballer who played with Adelaide in the Australian Football League (AFL).

Powell was recruited from South Adelaide, with the 56th selection of the 1992 AFL draft and played two league games in 1993. Over the next two season he made 14 appearances, seven each year, but didn't do enough to stay on Adelaide's list.

He kept playing SANFL football until retiring at the end of the 2004 season. In 2002 he was a member of the Sturt which ended their 26-year premiership drought. Playing as a defender, he was awarded the Jack Oatey Medal for his grand final performance.

His son Tom Powell also played for Sturt and was drafted by North Melbourne in the 2020 AFL draft.
