= Glenn Sandford =

Australian rules footballer

Personal information
- Born: 20 September 1971 (age 55)
- Original team: St Damians
- Debut: Round 2, 3 April 1993, Collingwood vs. Geelong, at Victoria Park

Playing career^{1}
Years	Club	Games (Goals)
1993–1994	Collingwood	5 (1)
1995–1998	North Adelaide	60 (29)
- ^{1} Playing statistics correct to the end of 1994.

Glenn Sandford (born 20 September 1971) is a former Australian rules footballer who played in the Australian Football League (AFL).

From St Damians, Sandford was a strong ruckman when he made his AFL debut for Collingwood in Round 2, 1993. With Damian Monkhorst the primary ruckman for the club, Sandford was used as a back-up in his five career games, but played mostly at centre half-back when on the ground.

Sandford played three games in his debut season and another two in 1994 before being delisted by the club.

Sandford then moved to the South Australian National Football League (SANFL), playing for Norwood and North Adelaide.

Glenn now lives in Papua New Guinea and is a four-time Port Moresby Table Tennis (B grade) Open finalist.
