= Ian Herman =

Australian rules footballer

Personal information
- Full name: Ian Herman
- Born: 11 October 1965 (age 61)
- Original team: Haileybury College/Collegians
- Draft: 3rd overall, 1992 Mid-Season Draft
- Height: 183 cm (6 ft 0 in)
- Weight: 78 kg (172 lb)
- Position: Ruck-rover

Playing career^{1}
Years	Club	Games (Goals)
1987–1991	Carlton	48 (38)
1992–1993	Richmond	14 (6)
Total		62 (44)
- ^{1} Playing statistics correct to the end of 1993.

Ian Herman (born 11 October 1965) is a former Australian rules footballer who played with Carlton and Richmond in the Australian Football League (AFL).
