= Leigh Capsalis =

Australian rules footballer

Personal information
- Full name: Leigh Capsalis
- Born: 23 December 1971 (age 54)
- Original teams: Keysborough, (MPNFL)
- Draft: No. 69, 1993 Preseason Draft

Playing career^{1}
| Years | Club | Games (Goals) |
| 1993 | St Kilda | 1 (0) |
- ^{1} Playing statistics correct to the end of 1993.

Leigh Capsalis (born 23 December 1971) is a former Australian rules footballer who played for St Kilda in the Australian Football League (AFL) in 1993. He was recruited from the Keysborough Football Club in the Mornington Peninsula Nepean Football League (MPNFL) with the 69th selection in the 1993 Preseason Draft.
