= Tim Allen (footballer) =

Australian rules footballer (born 1970)

Personal information
- Full name: Timothy Allen
- Born: 12 October 1970 (age 56)
- Original team: Mornington
- Draft: No. 29, 1988 national draft
- Height: 191 cm (6 ft 3 in)
- Weight: 85 kg (187 lb)
- Position: Full-forward

Playing career^{1}
Years	Club	Games (Goals)
1991–1992	St Kilda	22 (13)
1993–1994	Hawthorn	11 (4)
1995	Geelong	1 (0)
Total		34 (17)
- ^{1} Playing statistics correct to the end of 1995.

Timothy Allen (born 12 October 1970) is a former Australian rules footballer who played with St Kilda, Hawthorn and Geelong in the Australian Football League (AFL) during the 1990s.

Selected in the 1988 VFL Draft, Allen was a key forward and spent most of his four seasons at St Kilda in the reserves. His preferred position was full-forward but as St Kilda had Tony Lockett at the time his opportunities were limited. He finally broke into the seniors towards the end of the 1991 AFL season and played five games. In the 1992 season he was selected more regularly and appeared in 17 of a possible 23 games. Allen, who was used in the ruck on occasions, received three Brownlow Medal votes for his 22 disposal effort in a win over Adelaide that year.

He was traded to Hawthorn at the end of the season, in return for the 119th pick of the 1992 AFL draft. In two seasons, he played just eleven games and nominated for the 1994 draft. Geelong secured him with pick 81 but with the club having appeared in two of the last three grand finals, it was always going to be difficult to make it into the seniors. They made the grand final again in 1995 and Allen's only game came in the final round of the home and away season, due to the absence of both Gary Ablett and Billy Brownless.

After leaving the AFL, Allen continued to play in the Mornington Peninsula Nepean Football League.
