= Dion Scott =

Australian rules footballer

Personal information
- Full name: Dion Scott
- Born: 1 April 1970 (age 56)
- Original team: Devonport (TFL Statewide)
- Draft: No. 8, 1988 national draft
- Height: 190 cm (6 ft 3 in)
- Weight: 105 kg (231 lb)
- Positions: Key Positions, Ruckman

Playing career^{1}
Years	Club	Games (Goals)
1990, 1992	Sydney Swans	6 (0)
1993–96	Brisbane Bears	49 (39)
1997–99	Brisbane Lions	24 (22)
Total		79 (61)
- ^{1} Playing statistics correct to the end of 1999.

Dion Scott (born 1 April 1970) is a former Australian rules footballer who played for the Sydney Swans, Brisbane Bears and Brisbane Lions in the Australian Football League (AFL) during the 1990s.

A Tasmanian, Scott was brought up in Ulverstone but played his early football at Devonport. His AFL career was hampered by constant injuries, the first of which came when he damaged his vertebra while training with Sydney at Maroubra beach in 1991. He only managed six appearances for the Swans in three seasons and in the 1992 AFL draft was traded to Brisbane. Scott played three finals in 1996, including Brisbane's one point Qualifying Final win over Essendon, in which he contributed three goals.

The Bears merged with Fitzroy in 1997 to form the Brisbane Lions and Scott was a foundation player, kicking two goals in their opening round loss to Adelaide. He later played with the Redland Australian Football Club.
