= Mary Spargo =

American journalist

- Born: July 5, 1904; Yonkers, New York
- Died: September 24, 1991 (aged 87); Albany, New York
- Occupations: Journalist, columnist
- Writing career
- Language: English

Mary Spargo (1904–1991) was a 20th-century American newspaper journalist and columnist, best known for her coverage for the Washington Post of the House Un-American Activities Committee (HUAC), Richard Nixon, the Hollywood Ten, and the Hiss-Chambers Case. She was also a former HUAC investigator and "secret FBI informer."

== Background ==
Spargo was born in Yonkers, New York, and grew up in Bennington, Vermont. Her father, John Spargo, was a leading figure in the Socialist Party in the years prior to World War I, and the author of a number of books about socialism and Karl Marx. In later years he became a critic of socialism, and an expert on Vermont history.

She studied at the University of Vermont.

== Career ==
Spargo started her career by working for newspapers in New England.

In 1940, she moved to Washington and worked at first as an investigator for the House Un-American Activities Committee.

In 1942, she began to work for the Washington Post, for which she covered the U.S. Congress until she left the Post in 1950.

Hollywood Ten: On May 29, 1947, she reported the beginning of the House Un-American Activities Committee's hearings of 30 Hollywood stars, ten of whom (the "Hollywood Ten") refused to answer questions members including Nixon and who received contempt of Congress indictments.

1948 Progressive Party Convention: Spargo went to Philadelphia, where on July 22 she reported on the lead-up to the 1948 Progressive National Convention that nominated former U.S. Vice President Henry A. Wallace against the Harry S. Truman (Democrats), Strom Thurmond (Dixiecrats), and Thomas E. Dewey (Republicans). "Peace–peace and security–that's the slogan of the self-styled Gideon's army gathered here. "Caravans for Wallace" drove around the city with drawings on their sides of the Democratic donkey and Republican elephant going around the "same old merry-go-round" under the banner of Wall Street. Woody Guthrie was on-hand to sing his tune from the People's Song book, "The Wallace-Taylor Train" (a take on his Almanac Singers tune "The Farmer-Labor Train," itself a take-off on famed folksong "The Wabash Cannonball"). Press kits included a "natty postcard" which shows Truman on piano and Dewey draped over it ("Lauren Bacall style") while they sing "Blest Be the Tie Binds" and "A Good Man is Hard to Find."

Hiss Case: In 1948, Spargo reported on the testimony of Elizabeth Bentley and Whittaker Chambers, who alleged that some half-dozen former federal government officials had formed a Soviet spy network that he ran, one of whom was Alger Hiss. After the first appearances of both Chambers and Hiss before the House Un-American Activities Committee, after which Hiss appeared more trustworthy, Spargo counseled Richard Nixon that, if his hunch was wrong and he pursued Hiss further through Chambers, Nixon would be a "dead duck." She also warned him that "This case is going to kill the Committee unless you can prove Chambers' story."

FBI Informant: During the hearings of William Remington (accused of Soviet espionage by Elizabeth Bentley, Remington's wife suggested that he give an exclusive statement to Spargo because she had once worked for the House Un-American Activities Committee. Remington's wife was hoping also that Spargo could advise him on what to do. Remington spoke to Spargo to give her a preview of his upcoming press conference that evening at the Willard Hotel: it was a diatribe against Congress. Spargo cautioned him that with such statement would "crucify himself." The approach she counseled included praise for the committee and for Bentley. His only connection to Communism came through marriage that gave him a relationship to Joseph North (writer), long-time managing editor of the New Masses magazine in the 1930s.

While at the Post, she served as vice president of the Washington-Baltimore Newspaper Guild.

After she left the Post, sh worked for the American Red Cross and Daughters of the American Revolution, for the latter of which she worked as head of public relations.

In 1958, she moved to Albany, where she worked for the Albany Times Union and the government of the State of New York.

In 1977, she retired.

== Personal and death ==
Spargo married William Sherman Pryor. They had one daughter. They divorced.

She died age 84 of a heart attack at St. Peter's Hospital in Albany, New York.
