= Charlie Spargo =

Australian rules footballer (born 1999)

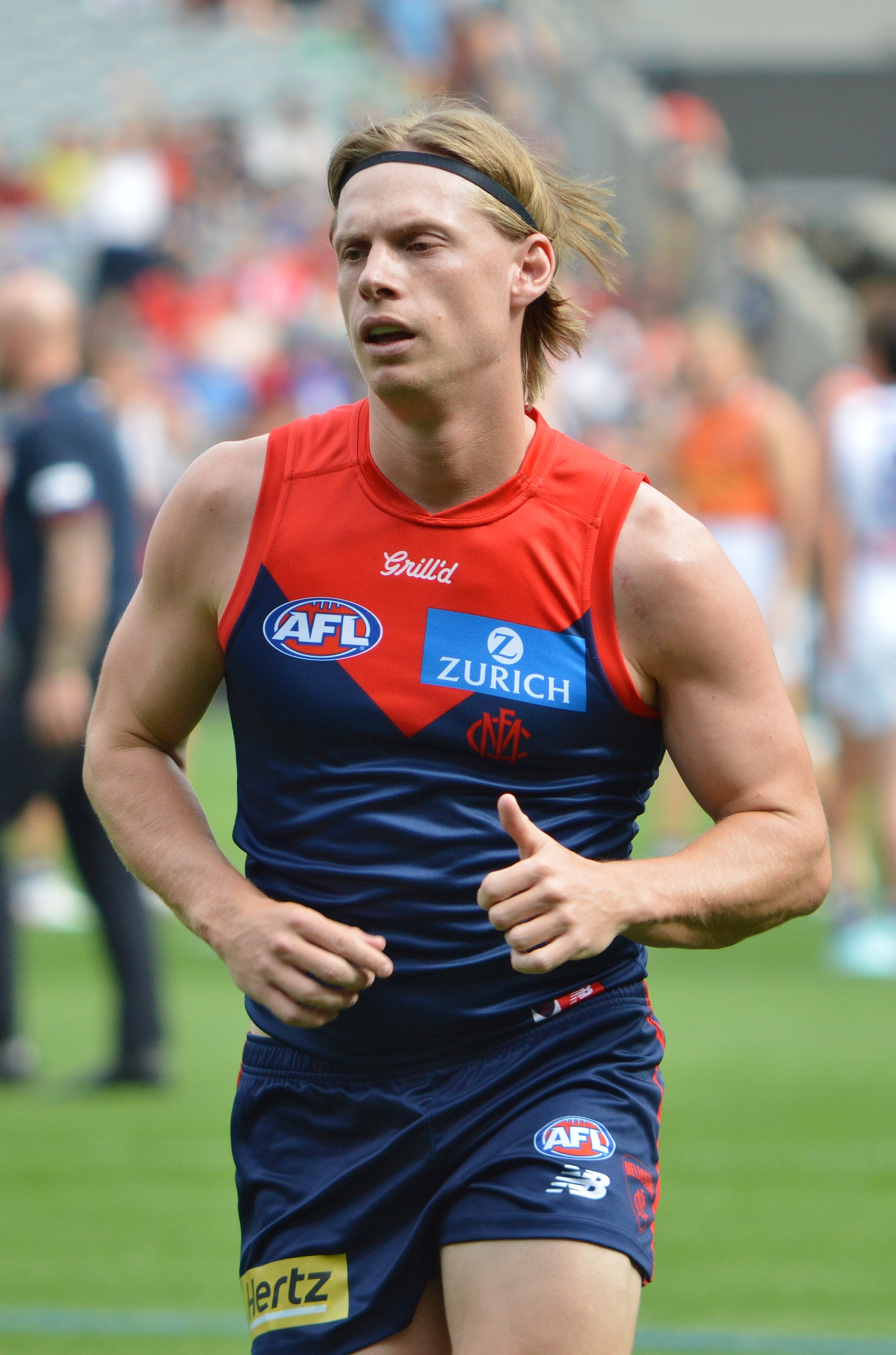
- Spargo playing for Melbourne in April 2025

Personal information
- Born: 25 November 1999 (age 26); Albury, New South Wales
- Original team: Murray Bushrangers (TAC Cup)
- Draft: No. 29, 2017 national draft
- Debut: Round 6, 2018, Melbourne vs. Essendon, at Etihad Stadium
- Height: 173 cm (5 ft 8 in)
- Weight: 76 kg (168 lb)
- Position: Forward

Club information
- Current club: North Melbourne
- Number: 13

Playing career^{1}
Years	Club	Games (Goals)
2018–2025	Melbourne	108 (64)
2026–	North Melbourne	17 (11)
Total		123 (74)
- ^{1} Playing statistics correct to the end of round 22, 2026.

Career highlights
- AFL premiership player: 2021

Charlie Spargo (born 25 November 1999) is a professional Australian rules footballer who plays for the North Melbourne Football Club in the Australian Football League (AFL). Spargo previously played for Melbourne. A small forward, 1.73 m (5 ft 8 in) tall and weighing 71 kg (157 lb), Spargo plays primarily as a forward, but also has the ability to play in the midfield. He has strong family connections in Australian football, whereby he is a fourth-generation VFL/AFL player, with his great-grandfather, grandfather, great uncle and father all playing in the VFL/AFL.

He was recognised as a talented footballer at a young age, being a part of the Greater Western Sydney Academy from twelve years of age. He also played as a bottom-aged player in the TAC Cup and in the Albury seniors at sixteen years of age. Further achievements as a junior included the Alan McLean Medal as the best player in division two of the under 16 championships, two-time selection in the AFL Academy and two-time selection for the Allies in the under 18 championships. Heading into his draft year, he was touted as a first-round draft selection; however, a season-ending shoulder injury saw him fall to the second round of the 2017 AFL draft when he was recruited by Melbourne. He made his AFL debut in Round 6 of the 2018 AFL season. Spargo was a part of Melbourne's 2021 premiership team, kicking one goal.

== Early life ==
Spargo was born to Kate and Paul Spargo on 25 November 1999 in Albury, New South Wales. Recognised as a talented footballer from a young age, Spargo was a part of the Greater Western Sydney Academy from twelve years of age. He attended Melbourne Grammar School from 2015 on a scholarship for grades ten to twelve. There, he nearly went down a pathway of soccer after scoring 7 goals in the annual School House vs Perry House match. At the end of 2015, Spargo earned selection in the AFL Academy due to his performances in the under-16 championships playing with the NSW/ACT Rams, where he won the Alan McLean Medal as the best player in division two. While he was in year 11 in 2016, he played football with the Albury Football Club seniors team in the Ovens & Murray Football League at 16 years of age and Murray Bushrangers in the TAC Cup as a bottom-aged player. In April, he played two games with the UWS Giants in the North East Australian Football League, averaging 17 disposals as part of the GWS Academy.

Despite being a bottom-aged player, Spargo was selected in the NSW/ACT Rams team in division two of the 2016 AFL Under 18 Championships with NSW/ACT talent manager, Darren Denneman, stating "[Spargo's] a player who uses the ball well and probably has one of the best footy brains in terms of understanding the game and knowing how to play it". His performances with the NSW/ACT Rams saw him earn selection in the Allies team in division one of the championships, whereby division one matches started a month after division two. Playing with the Murray Bushrangers, the team made it to the grand final in which the Bushrangers lost by seventeen points; Spargo recorded 24 disposals and was named the Bushrangers' best player by AFL Media journalist Callum Twomey. At the end of the season, he played in the under-17s All-Stars match and was named in Team Judd's best players by AFL Media after recording 16 disposals and a goal. His performances throughout the year saw him earn selection in the AFL Academy for the second consecutive year.

Heading into his final junior year, Spargo was touted as a first-round draft pick for the 2017 AFL draft. In March 2017, the AFL announced the Riverina would no longer be a part of the GWS Academy zone, meaning GWS would no longer have priority access to drafting Spargo in the 2017 draft. Despite the GWS Academy zone announcement, he played in an exhibition match for the GWS Academy against the Sydney Swans Academy a week after GWS lost access to Spargo, in the match he recorded a game-high twenty-five disposals along with six tackles, five inside 50s and a goal, and was named GWS' second best player by AFL Media's Giulio Di Giorgio. Playing school football for the first half of the year, he was selected to play for the Allies for the second consecutive year in the 2017 AFL Under 18 Championships. In his first match for the Allies, he dislocated his shoulder and was forced to miss the remainder of the season. He was listed with the Murray Bushrangers in the TAC Cup for the season but did not play a game due to GWS Academy commitments and injury.

== AFL career ==
=== Melbourne (2018–2025) ===
Spargo was drafted by Melbourne with their first selection and twenty-ninth overall in the 2017 national draft. He was eased into pre-season training with Melbourne due to his shoulder injury sustained in 2017. He played the start of the season in the Victorian Football League (VFL) with Melbourne's affiliate team, the Casey; in Casey's opening-round match, he was reported and suspended for one match for striking Coburg's Nick Mellington. He returned to the VFL in Round 3 against Richmond and his performance in the match saw him named for his AFL debut in the Round 6 match against Essendon at Etihad Stadium. In the 36-point win, he recorded 18 disposals and two goals with Fox Sports Australia's Anna Harrington writing Spargo was pivotal in the win and The Age's Anthony Colangelo noted he "played with a composure that belied his level of experience".

In June 2020, Spargo was suspended for two matches for breaching AFL COVID-19 protocols after he and teammate Kysaiah Pickett travelled via an Uber to an unauthorised house for a gathering.

In the 2021 AFL Grand Final, Spargo kicked a goal which contributed to Melbourne's first premiership in 57 years. On the 17 May 2022 Spargo signed a new three-year contract with Melbourne through to the 2025 season.

Following the end of the 2025 season, Spargo chose to exercise his rights as an unrestricted free agent following absence of senior selection due to an Achilles injury the year prior. Shortly after, Spargo announced his intention to join the Kangaroos. North Melbournes Head of Football Talent Brady Rawlings announced they would offer Spargo a contract when the free agency period opens.

=== North Melbourne (2026–present) ===
On 6 October 2025, Spargo completed his free agency move to North Melbourne.

== Statistics ==
Updated to the end of round 22, 2026.

Legend
G	Goals	K	Kicks	D	Disposals	T	Tackles
B	Behinds	H	Handballs	M	Marks

Season	Team	No.	Games	Totals							Averages (per game)							Votes
Season	Team	No.	Games	G	B	K	H	D	M	T	G	B	K	H	D	M	T	Votes
2018	Melbourne	9	18	14	9	112	107	219	66	55	0.8	0.5	6.2	5.9	12.2	3.7	3.1	0
2019	Melbourne	9	8	2	1	56	34	90	27	17	0.3	0.1	7.0	4.3	11.3	3.4	2.1	0
2020 (Note: The 2020 season was played with 17 home-and-away matches per team (down from 22) and 16-minute quarters with time on (down from 20-minute quarters with time on) due to the impact of the COVID-19 pandemic.)	Melbourne	9	8	8	1	38	27	65	18	11	1.0	0.1	4.8	3.4	8.1	2.3	1.4	0
2021^{#}	Melbourne	9	25	18	16	195	92	287	84	59	0.7	0.6	7.8	3.7	11.5	3.4	2.4	0
2022	Melbourne	9	24	10	12	179	103	282	96	57	0.4	0.5	7.5	4.3	11.8	4.0	2.4	0
2023 (Note: 2023 statistics include two games in which Spargo was substituted out of the game (rounds 5 & 13).)	Melbourne	9	14	11	6	92	48	140	45	26	0.8	0.4	6.6	3.4	10.0	3.2	1.9	0
2024	Melbourne	9	1	0	1	5	7	12	1	2	0.0	1.0	5.0	7.0	12.0	1.0	2.0	0
2025	Melbourne	9	10	1	4	46	50	96	21	26	0.1	0.4	4.6	5.0	9.6	2.1	2.6	0
2026	North Melbourne	13	17	11	3	110	103	213	68	32	0.6	0.2	6.5	6.1	12.5	4.0	1.9	0
Career			125	75	53	833	571	1404	426	285	0.6	0.4	6.7	4.6	11.2	3.4	2.3	0

== Honours and achievements ==
Team

- AFL premiership player (Melbourne): 2021
- McClelland Trophy (Melbourne): 2021

== Playing style ==
Spargo played as a midfielder throughout his junior years with AFL Media journalist, Callum Twomey, describing Spargo at the end of 2016 as a "tough and active midfielder who belies his size to dig into the packs and find the ball on a consistent basis". Heading into the 2017 AFL draft, he was touted as a player who could play both in the forward line and midfield, with Fox Sports Australia's Riley Beveridge writing Spargo is clean at ground level but also has the ability to play as a pressuring forward with his chase and tackle. Callum Twomey echoed this description by noting Spargo is a consistent ball winner who tackles hard and also play in the forward line.

Around the 2017 draft, his playing style was compared with Greater Western Sydney player's, Toby Greene's, by Fox Sports Australia's Ben Waterworth whereby both are "pocket rockets that [are] just as good in the air as [they are] on the ground" He also drew comparisons to VFL/AFL games-record holder, Brent Harvey, by the Herald Sun's Jon Ralph, with both Spargo and Harvey being the same height, in addition to similar playmaking skills and poise. After being drafted to Melbourne, Melbourne recruiter, Jason Taylor, stated Spargo would play the early part of his AFL career in the forward line due to his "ability to hit the scoreboard and his deceptive strength overhead", but would most likely move into the midfield throughout his career due to his ability to cover the ground.

== Family ==
He is a fourth-generation VFL/AFL footballer, whereby his father, Paul Spargo, played 81 games for North Melbourne and nine for the Brisbane Bears; his grandfather, Bob Spargo, played 80 matches for Footscray; his great uncle, Ricky Spargo, played 64 matches for Footscray; and his great-grandfather, Bob Spargo Sr., played 65 games for Footscray and two for Melbourne. His cousin Bo Nixon played for Collingwood and Hawthorn. He also considers Shane Warne and Greg "Blewey" Blewett, who played 145 and 46 tests for Australia respectively, fatherly figures with significant influence in his life, despite never meeting them.
