= John Howat =

Australian rules footballer

Personal information
- Full name: John Howat
- Born: 15 July 1970 (age 56)
- Original team: Bayside
- Height: 187 cm (6 ft 2 in)
- Weight: 89 kg (196 lb)

Playing career^{1}
Years	Club	Games (Goals)
1989–1992	Melbourne	20 (10)
1993–1996	Richmond	45 (2)
Total		65 (12)
- ^{1} Playing statistics correct to the end of 1996.

John Howat (born 15 July 1970) is a former Australian rules footballer who played with Melbourne and Richmond in the Australian Football League (AFL).

A tall utility player, Howat was used on both ends of the ground during his league career, which began in 1989. In his four seasons with Melbourne he never played more than six games in a season.

He was picked up by Richmond with the 97th selection of the 1992 AFL draft, where he rejoined with his previous coach John Northey. In just his second game for his new club, against the Brisbane Bears, Howat had 25 disposals and earned three Brownlow Medal votes for his efforts. Unlike at Melbourne, Howat was able to establish a regular place in the team and missed just three games in his debut season. He added another 17 games in 1994 and although he played just four times the following year, he appeared in Richmond's preliminary final loss.

Howat was delisted after the 1996 season and went on to coach Mitcham in the Eastern Football League, in 1999 and 2000. He played on some of the games great full forwards of all time including Tony Lockett, Jason Dunstall, Warwick Capper and Gary Ablett Senior.
