= Scott Direen =

Australian rules footballer

Personal information
- Full name: Scott Direen
- Born: 20 October 1972 (age 54)
- Original team: New Norfolk
- Draft: 95th, 1992 National Draft
- Height: 180 cm (5 ft 11 in)
- Weight: 83 kg (183 lb)

Playing career^{1}
Years	Club	Games (Goals)
1993–1997	Sydney Swans	52 (10)
- ^{1} Playing statistics correct to the end of 2004.

Scott Direen (born 20 October 1972) is a former Australian rules footballer who played with the Sydney Swans in the Australian Football League (AFL).

Drafted from Tasmanian club New Norfolk, Direen was a defender during his time in Sydney. He played 19 of a possible 22 games in 1995, the most appearances he made in a season. In 1996 he added another 13 games but was not selected in the grand final team, or in any of the finals. He had been badly injured that year in a game against Richmond, suffering spinal concussion.

Direen finished his career in South Australia, playing 114 games for Norwood, between 1998 and 2004. He won their best and fairest award in 2000.
