= Bernie Guthrie =

Australian rules footballer, born 1911

Personal information
- Full name: Bernie Guthrie
- Born: 22 September 1911
- Died: 26 April 1982 (aged 70)
- Original team: Wonthaggi
- Height: 184 cm (6 ft 0 in)
- Weight: 86 kg (190 lb)

Playing career^{1}
Years	Club	Games (Goals)
1933	Collingwood	7 (5)
1936–1937	North Melbourne	16 (9)
Total		23 (14)
- ^{1} Playing statistics correct to the end of 1937.

Bernie Guthrie (22 September 1911 – 26 April 1982) was an Australian rules footballer who played for the Collingwood Football Club and North Melbourne Football Club in the Victorian Football League (VFL).
