= Fred Backway =

Australian rules footballer, born 1913

Personal information
- Full name: Frederick Backway
- Born: 2 October 1913; Maryborough, Victoria
- Died: 28 March 1995 (aged 81)
- Original team: Wonthaggi
- Height: 170 cm (5 ft 7 in)
- Weight: 64 kg (141 lb)

Playing career^{1}
Years	Club	Games (Goals)
1933–34	South Melbourne	4 (2)
1935, 1937	Melbourne	3 (1)
1938	Fitzroy	1 (0)
Total		8 (3)
- ^{1} Playing statistics correct to the end of 1938.

Fred Backway (2 October 1913 – 28 March 1995) was an Australian rules footballer who played with South Melbourne, Melbourne and Fitzroy in the Victorian Football League (VFL).
