= Paul Bulluss =

Australian rules footballer

Personal information
- Full name: Paul Bulluss
- Born: 23 January 1970 (age 56)
- Original team: Woodville-West Torrens (SANFL)
- Draft: 52nd, 1992 AFL draft
- Height: 194 cm (6 ft 4 in)
- Weight: 95 kg (209 lb)

Playing career^{1}
Years	Club	Games (Goals)
1993–1998	Richmond	97 (20)
- ^{1} Playing statistics correct to the end of 1998.

Paul Bulluss (born 23 January 1970) is a former Australian rules footballer who played with Richmond in the Australian Football League (AFL) during the 1990s.

Originally from South Australian National Football League (SANFL) club Woodville-West Torrens, Bulluss was drafted with the 52nd pick of the 1992 AFL draft. He played 19 games in his debut season and in 1995 participated in Richmond's finals series. A key defender, he also played for South Australia in their State of Origin match against Victoria at the MCG in 1995.

After leaving Richmond at the end of the 1998 season he joined Balywn in the Southern Football League with whom he won a premiership. Bullus was named in the Woodville-West Torrens 'Team of the Decade'.
