= Nick Hanson =

Australian rules footballer

Personal information
- Full name: Nick Hanson
- Born: 21 September 1973 (age 53)
- Original teams: Sandringham, (VFA)
- Draft: 1. 76, 1993 Pre-season Draft

Playing career^{1}
Years	Club	Games (Goals)
1993	St Kilda	1 (0)
- ^{1} Playing statistics correct to the end of 1993.

Nick Hanson (born 21 September 1973) is a former Australian rules footballer who played for St Kilda in the Australian Football League (AFL) in 1993. He was recruited from the Sandringham Football Club in the Victorian Football Association (VFA) with the 76th selection in the 1993 Pre-season Draft.
