= Darren Payne =

Australian rules footballer

Personal information
- Full name: Darren Payne
- Born: 1 July 1974 (age 52)
- Original team: Doncaster Heights
- Height: 177 cm (5 ft 10 in)
- Weight: 81 kg (179 lb)

Playing career^{1}
Years	Club	Games (Goals)
1993–1995	Fitzroy	6 (1)
- ^{1} Playing statistics correct to the end of 1995.

Darren Payne (born 1 July 1974) is a former Australian rules footballer who played with Fitzroy in the Australian Football League (AFL).

Recruited from Doncaster Heights, Payne made his AFL debut in 1993 and played six league games over the course of three seasons.

Payne crossed to Victorian Football League (VFA) club Box Hill in 1996 and won their best and fairest award that year. In 1997 he moved to Western Australia to play for Claremont.
