= Andrew Tranquilli =

Australian rules footballer

Personal information
- Full name: Andrew Tranquilli
- Born: 21 April 1972 (age 54)
- Original team: Marcellin
- Draft: 68th, 1993 Pre-Season Draft
- Height: 186 cm (6 ft 1 in)
- Weight: 83 kg (183 lb)

Playing career^{1}
Years	Club	Games (Goals)
1993–1995	Collingwood	12 (20)
- ^{1} Playing statistics correct to the end of 1995.

Andrew Tranquilli (born 21 April 1972) is a former Australian rules footballer who played with Collingwood in the Australian Football League (AFL) during the 1990s.

Tranquilli, a half forward, was picked up by Collingwood in the 1993 Pre-Season draft with the 68th selection.

He played just once in 1993 but returned to the team in the opening round of the 1994 season. It was not until round 13, against West Coast at the MCG, that he appeared again and he put in the best performance of his career with six goals. This cemented his place in the side for the rest of the season, which ended with participation in a qualifying final.
