= Wayne Hernaman =

Australian rules footballer

Personal information
- Full name: Wayne John Hernaman
- Born: 15 May 1972 (age 54)
- Original teams: South Fremantle, (WAFL)
- Draft: No. 7, 1992 AFL draft

Playing career^{1}
Years	Club	Games (Goals)
1992	South Fremantle	18 (10)
1993–94	Richmond	20 (9)
- ^{1} Playing statistics correct to the end of 1994.

Wayne John Hernaman (born 15 May 1972) is a former Australian rules footballer who played twenty games for Richmond in the Australian Football League (AFL) between 1993 and 1994. He was recruited from the South Fremantle Football Club in the West Australian Football League (WAFL) with the 7th selection in the 1992 AFL draft.
