= Danny Morton =

Australian rules footballer (born 1973)

Personal information
- Born: 1 July 1973 (age 53)
- Original team: North Adelaide (SANFL)
- Draft: 70th, 1992 National Draft
- Height: 175 cm (5 ft 9 in)
- Weight: 64 kg (141 lb)
- Position: Rover

Playing career^{1}
| Years | Club | Games (Goals) |
| 1993–1996 | Fitzroy | 30 (17) |
| 1998–2000 | Port Adelaide | 20 (17) |
| Total | | 50 (34) |
- ^{1} Playing statistics correct to the end of 2000.

Danny Morton (born 1 July 1973) is a former Australian rules footballer who played with Fitzroy and Port Adelaide in the Australian Football League (AFL).

From South Australia, Morton played for North Adelaide in the South Australian National Football League before being drafted by Fitzroy with the 70th selection of the 1992 National Draft.

Morton played just 14 games in his first three seasons at Fitzroy, but managed 16 games in 1996, Fitzroy's last season before its merger with Brisbane Football Club.

Morton returned to North Adelaide for the 1997 SANFL season, playing well enough to be drafted by Port Adelaide with pick 41 at the 1997 Draft.

Morton made his debut for Port Adelaide in 1998 and when Port drew with Brisbane at Brisbane's home ground Gabba in round 12, Morton received two Brownlow Medal, finishing with 27 disposals and four goals. The following round, while playing against the Western Bulldogs, Morton badly injured his neck when he landed on his head after contesting a mark. His injury required surgery, with the C4 and C5 vertebrae from his neck being fused together using a bone from his hip. He did not play again for the rest of the season or in 1999. Morton returned to the AFL in 2000, appearing in seven of the first 10 rounds, but then lost his place in the team permanently.

Following his delisting by Port Adelaide at the end of 2000, Morton joined SANFL club Norwood in 2001.

After retiring from football, Morton became a PE teacher at Adelaide's Tyndale Christian School.
