= Robert Schaefer (footballer) =

Australian rules footballer

Personal information
- Full name: Robert Schaefer
- Born: 14 February 1972 (age 54)
- Original teams: Sturt, (SANFL)
- Draft: Richmond: No. 82, 1992 AFL draft Collingwood: No. 14, 1997 Pre-season Draft

Playing career^{1}
Years	Club	Games (Goals)
1993	Richmond	11 (3)
- ^{1} Playing statistics correct to the end of 1997.

Robert Schaefer (born 14 February 1972) is a former Australian rules footballer who played for Richmond in the Australian Football League (AFL) in 1993. He was recruited from the Sturt Football Club in the South Australian National Football League (SANFL) with the 82nd selection in the 1992 AFL draft.

After playing eleven games in 1993, he failed to play another game for Richmond before he was delisted at the end of the 1995 season. He returned to South Australia and switched teams to play for Central District. He was then selected by Collingwood with the 14th selection in the 1997 Pre-season Draft, but did not manage to play an AFL game for Collingwood.
