= Mark Viska =

Australian rules footballer

Personal information
- Full name: Mark Viska
- Born: 29 April 1971 (age 55)
- Original team: Glenelg
- Height: 178 cm (5 ft 10 in)
- Weight: 85 kg (187 lb)

Playing career^{1}
Years	Club	Games (Goals)
1993–1997	Adelaide	33 (1)
- ^{1} Playing statistics correct to the end of 1997.

Mark Viska (born 29 April 1971) is a former Australian rules footballer who played with Adelaide in the Australian Football League (AFL) during the 1990s.

Viska, who was a member of Glenelg's losing 1992 SANFL Grand Final team, joined Adelaide in 1993. He played mostly as a half back and played finals football in his debut season after making his first game mid year. Viska however could only put together 23 more appearances for Adelaide in the following four seasons, two of them in their 1997 premiership winning year. He retired from football after the 2001 SANFL season, having played 143 games for Glenelg.
