= Greg Doyle =

Australian rules footballer

Personal information
- Full name: Greg Doyle
- Born: 24 September 1970 (age 56)
- Original team: Springvale (VFA)
- Height: 190 cm (6 ft 3 in)
- Weight: 101 kg (223 lb)

Playing career^{1}
Years	Club	Games (Goals)
1990	St Kilda	2 (3)
1993–1996	Melbourne	29 (14)
Total		31 (17)
- ^{1} Playing statistics correct to the end of 1996.

Greg Doyle (born 24 September 1970) is a former Australian rules footballer who played with St Kilda and Melbourne in the Australian Football League (AFL).

Recruited from Victorian Football Association (VFA) club Springvale, Doyle played two senior games for St Kilda in 1990, before his sacking at the end of the season.

The following year Doyle moved to fellow VFA club Dandenong's, and was a member of Dandenong's 1991 premiership team.

Doyle returned to the AFL via the 1992 Mid-Season Draft, selected at pick two by Melbourne. In 1993 Doyle played in a reserves premiership but was selected more regularly in 1994, making 13 appearances.

Doyle played seven games in each of the next two seasons. He returned to the VFA/VFL in 1997 for Traralgon, winning the best and fairest that year.

Doyle was appointed head coach of Rye in 2000 and also spent time at Traralgon as an assistant coach. He served as assistant coach of TAC Cup team the Oakleigh Chargers from 2005 to 2008 and then worked with Vic Metro as an assistant coach, in 2009 and 2010.
