= Michael Dunstan =

Australian rules footballer

Personal information
- Full name: Michael Harold Dunstan
- Born: 12 March 1971 (age 55)
- Original team: South Fremantle (WAFL)
- Draft: 40th, 1992 AFL draft
- Height: 185 cm (6 ft 1 in)
- Weight: 88 kg (194 lb)

Playing career^{1}
| Years | Club | Games (Goals) |
| 1993–1994 | Fitzroy | 38 (30) |
| 1995 | West Coast Eagles | 5 (1) |
| Total | | 43 (31) |
- ^{1} Playing statistics correct to the end of 1995.

Michael Harold Dunstan (born 12 March 1971) is a former Australian rules footballer who played with Fitzroy and the West Coast Eagles in the Australian Football League (AFL).

From Western Australia, Dunstan made his debut for Western Australian Football League (WAFL) club South Fremantle in 1991 and was drafted by Fitzroy, with the 40th selection of the 1992 AFL draft.

Dunstan made his AFL debut in 1993, against Carlton and kicked goals with his first two kicks. He finished the season with 20 games and 20 goals and the half forward added another 18 games in 1994.

The rest of Dunstan's career was ruined by injury and he managed just five appearances after joining West Coast. He continued playing for South Fremantle but injuries forced him to retire in 1998.
