= Bob Spargo =

Australian rules footballer

Personal information
- Full name: Robert Leslie Spargo
- Born: 15 October 1939 (age 87)
- Original team: Footscray
- Height: 183 cm (6 ft 0 in)
- Weight: 81 kg (179 lb)
- Position: Centreman

Playing career^{1}
| Years | Club | Games (Goals) |
| 1958–1963 | Footscray | 80 (43) |
| 1964-1967 | West Perth | 64 (91) |
| Total | | 144 (134) |
- ^{1} Playing statistics correct to the end of 1963.

Robert Leslie Spargo (born 15 October 1939) is a former Australian rules footballer who played for Footscray in the Victorian Football League (VFL).

Spargo started as a half forward but soon established himself in the side as a centreman and it was in that position that he appeared in the 1961 VFL Grand Final loss to Hawthorn. He had his best VFL season in 1962 when he polled nine Brownlow Medal votes, placing him second behind John Schultz amongst Footscray players that year.

Spargo was lured over to West Perth in 1965, as captain-coach and he won a Simpson Medal the same year for his performance against the Victorians in an interstate match.

He comes from an Australian rules football playing family, his brother Ricky was a Footscray player as was their father, who also played for Melbourne Bob senior. A son, Paul Spargo, was an AFL footballer at North Melbourne and the Brisbane Bears. His grandson and Paul's son, Charlie Spargo plays for Melbourne and when he debuted the Spargo family became the first family to produce four league footballers in a direct line.

The family was also heavily involved in athletics with three Stawell Gift Finalists including Bob snr who ran third in both the 1936 and 1940 Stawell Gift finals, Bob Jnr who also ran in a Stawell Gift final and his brother Ricky who ran 5th in the 1974 Stawell Gift final.
