= Tony Godden (Australian footballer) =

Australian rules footballer

Personal information
- Born: 19 April 1972 (age 54)
- Original team: Subiaco (WAFL)
- Debut: Round 20, 1993, West Coast vs. Hawthorn, at Subiaco Oval

Playing career^{1}
Years	Club	Games (Goals)
1993–1995	West Coast	13 (8)
1996–1998	Fremantle	11 (6)
Total		24 (14)
- ^{1} Playing statistics correct to the end of 1998.

Tony Godden (born 19 April 1972) is a former Australian rules footballer who played for the West Coast Eagles and Fremantle in the Australian Football League (AFL).

He was originally drafted by the Eagles from Subiaco in the West Australian Football League with selection 64 in the 1992 AFL draft. After playing 13 games over three seasons he was selected by Fremantle as an uncontracted player. As per the AFL drafting rules at the time, the Eagles were then entitled to a compensation draft selection, which they used to select 16-year-old David Wirrpanda, who went on to play over 200 AFL games. Godden would play a total of 11 games for Fremantle in three seasons before being delisted at the end of the 1998 season after missing the entire 1997 season due to injury.
