= Chris Hollow =

Australian rules footballer

Personal information
- Full name: Chris Hollow
- Born: 21 November 1971 (age 54)
- Original team: Dandenong (VFL)
- Draft: No. 46, 1993 Pre-season Draft
- Height: 190 cm (6 ft 3 in)
- Weight: 85 kg (187 lb)

Playing career^{1}
Years	Club	Games (Goals)
1993–1995	St Kilda	24 (5)
- ^{1} Playing statistics correct to the end of 1995.

Chris Hollow (born 21 November 1971) is a former Australian rules footballer who played with St Kilda in the Australian Football League (AFL).

Hollow was selected by St Kilda with pick 46 in the 1993 Pre-season Draft, from Victorian Football League (VFL) club Dandenong. He played 24 league games for St Kilda, over the course of three seasons.

Following his AFL career, Hollow wrote for the television show Neighbours, perform in the band Sand Pebbles, and currently produces the breakfast show on ABC Radio Melbourne.
