= Darren Baxter (Australian footballer) =

Australian rules footballer

Personal information
- Full name: Darren Baxter
- Born: 19 March 1965 (age 61)
- Original team: East Malvern
- Height: 185 cm (6 ft 1 in)
- Weight: 85 kg (187 lb)

Playing career^{1}
Years	Club	Games (Goals)
1984–1992	Footscray	129 (28)
1993–1994	Hawthorn	27 (2)
Total		156 (30)
- ^{1} Playing statistics correct to the end of 1994.

Darren Baxter (born 19 March 1965) is a former Australian rules footballer who played with Footscray and Hawthorn in the Australian Football League (AFL).

The son of former Footscray footballer Ray Baxter, he could play a variety of roles but was used initially as a tagger before developing into a ruck-rover. It wasn't until 1987, when he played every game, that he cemented his spot in the team and he gave the club good service for the rest of the decade.

In both the 1991 and 1992 seasons, Baxter was Footscray's top kick getter and in the latter of those years came fourth in the league. He averaged 22.52 disposals a game in 1991 and the following season had 114 marks and 521 disposals from 25 appearances. In the 1992 Qualifying Final he had 25 disposals in a loss to Geelong and he played two further finals that year.

In the 1992 AFL draft, Baxter was surprisingly traded to Hawthorn in return for two late draft picks and played 19 games in his first season, including an elimination final.
