= Martin Heffernan =

Australian rules footballer

Personal information
- Full name: Martin Heffernan
- Born: 28 August 1972 (age 54)
- Original team: Terang
- Height: 193 cm (6 ft 4 in)
- Weight: 82 kg (181 lb)

Playing career^{1}
| Years | Club | Games (Goals) |
| 1992 | Geelong | 3 (1) |
| 1993 | Brisbane Bears | 2 (1) |
| Total | | 5 (2) |
- ^{1} Playing statistics correct to the end of 1993.

Martin Heffernan (born 28 August 1972) is a former Australian rules footballer who played with Geelong and the Brisbane Bears in the Australian Football League (AFL).

Originally from Terang, Heffernan played his three games for Geelong midway through the 1992 AFL season. With Geelong going on to make the grand final, Heffernan was unable to break into the seniors on any more occasions.

He was selected by Brisbane in the 1993 Pre-Season Draft with pick six but would only add two further games to his league tally.
