= John Warren Spargo =

John Warren Spargo from the Northrop Grumman Corporation, Redondo Beach, CA was named Fellow of the Institute of Electrical and Electronics Engineers (IEEE) in 2013 for leadership in superconducting electronics and related technologies.
