= Jeff Chandler (Australian footballer) =

Australian rules footballer

Personal information
- Full name: Jeff Chandler
- Born: 12 March 1966 (age 60)
- Original team: Strathmore
- Height: 179 cm (5 ft 10 in)
- Weight: 79 kg (174 lb)
- Position: Defence

Playing career^{1}
Years	Club	Games (Goals)
1987–92	North Melbourne	50 (4)
- ^{1} Playing statistics correct to the end of 1992.

Jeff Chandler (born 12 March 1966) is a former Australian rules footballer who played with North Melbourne in the Victorian Football League (VFL). He went at pick 110 in the 1992 AFL draft. He kicked four goals in his 50 games.
