= Mark Bunn (Australian footballer) =

Australian rules footballer (born 1970)

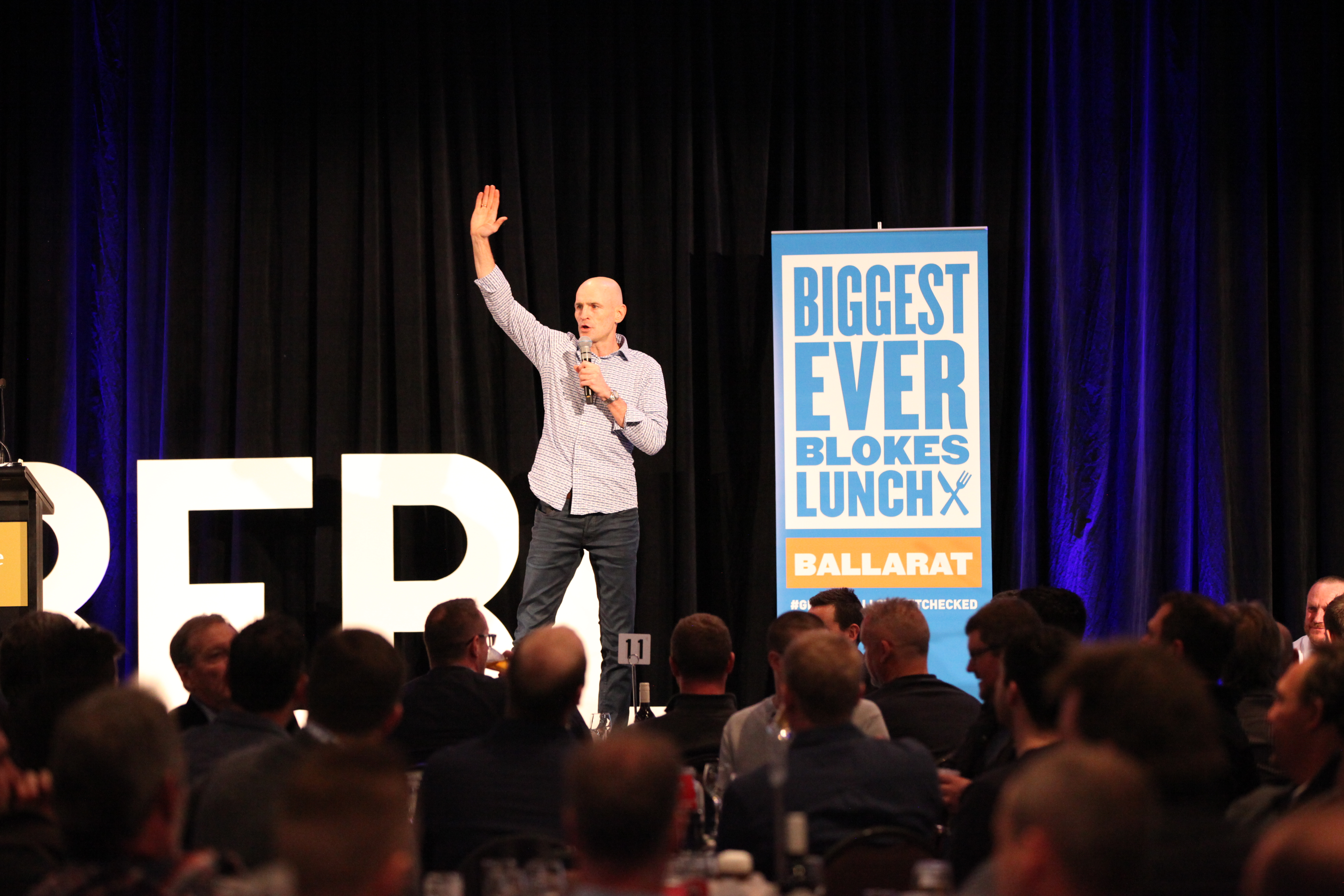
- Bunn speaking at a Men's Health Fundraiser in Ballarat, September 2019

Personal information
- Born: 24 October 1970 (age 56); Victoria
- Original team: East Doncaster
- Debut: Round 6, 1990, Fitzroy vs. Footscray, at VFL Park Waverley
- Height: 182 cm (6 ft 0 in)
- Weight: 78 kg (172 lb)

Playing career^{1}
| Years | Club | Games (Goals) |
| 1990–1992 | Fitzroy | 30 (1) |
| 1993–1995 | Hawthorn | 23 (1) |
| Total | | 53 (2) |
- ^{1} Playing statistics correct to the end of 1995.

Career highlights
- Runner-up Senior best and fairest 1990; 3 Reserve grade best and fairest

Mark Bunn (born 24 October 1970) is a former Australian rules footballer.

== Career ==
Bunn played in the AFL from 1990 to 1995, including with the Fitzroy Football Club between 1990 and 1992, and later the Hawthorn Football Club from 1993 to 1995. He played a total of 53 games.

== Post-football ==
Following his football career, Bunn has become a professional speaker in the areas of health, wellbeing, and business performance, specializing in combining Ayurvedic medicine with Western-health science.

In 2010, he wrote the book Ancient Wisdom for Modern Health.

== Publication and works ==
- Ancient Wisdom for Modern Health - The Essential Wisdoms of Health & Happiness. Enlightened Health Publishing. 2010. ISBN 978-0-9807597-0-9.
