= Jayson Daniels =

Australian rules footballer (born 1971)

Personal information
- Full name: Jayson Daniels
- Born: 19 February 1971 (age 55)
- Original team: Parkmore
- Positions: Defender, tagger

Playing career
Years	Club	Games (Goals)
1988–1992	St Kilda	74 (19)
1993–1995	Sydney	58 (4)
1996–1998	St Kilda	41 (7)
Total		173 (30)

Jayson Daniels (born 19 February 1971) is an Australian rules footballer who played in the VFL/AFL.

== Career ==
Debuting in the VFL in 1988, he was recruited from Parkmore, Victoria to the St Kilda Football Club. The red-headed Daniels, known as "Jack", was used in a number of defensive roles. In 1993, he debuted for the Sydney Swans, where he played until 1995. In 1996, he moved back to his original AFL team, the St Kilda Football Club. He was injured with a shoulder problem in 1997 and his final season of AFL was in 1998. Daniels played 173 AFL games in total.
