= Adrian Campbell =

Australian rules footballer

Personal information
- Full name: Adrian Campbell
- Born: 4 January 1969 (age 57); Ringwood, Victoria
- Original team: Traralgon (LVFL)
- Height: 190 cm (6 ft 3 in)
- Weight: 90 kg (198 lb)

Playing career^{1}
| Years | Club | Games (Goals) |
| 1988–1992 | Footscray | 30 (31) |
| 1993–1994 | Melbourne | 2 (5) |
| Total | | 32 (36) |
- ^{1} Playing statistics correct to the end of 1993.

Adrian Campbell (born 4 January 1969) is a former Australian rules footballer who played with Footscray and Melbourne in the Victorian Football League (VFL).

Campbell, who was recruited from LaTrobe Valley Football League (LVFL) club Traralgon, spent much of his time at Melbourne in the reserves. He did however, from his 14 senior games in 1989, top Footscray's goal-kicking. His tally of 21 goals was the lowest total from their leading goal-kicker since 1963.

He is now an assistant football coach of Vermont Football Club in Victoria.
