= Raymond Steele =

Australian rules footballer, born 1917

Personal information
- Born: 19 May 1917
- Died: 22 November 1993 (aged 76)
- Original team: University Blacks
- Height: 183 cm (6 ft 0 in)
- Weight: 81.5 kg (180 lb)

Playing career^{1}
Years	Club	Games (Goals)
1940–1943	Richmond	42 (1)
- ^{1} Playing statistics correct to the end of 1943.

Career highlights
- Richmond premiership player - 1943

Raymond Steele (19 May 1917 – 22 November 1993, educated at Scotch College, Melbourne) was an Australian rules footballer who played in the VFL from 1940 to 1943 for the Richmond Football Club.

Steele also played District Cricket for University and Hawthorn-East Melbourne between 1937 and 1949, later serving as President of the Victorian Cricket Association for 19 years and Treasurer of the Australian Cricket Board for 16 years. Steele was the manager of the Australian cricket team on its 1972 tour of England.

Steele was appointed as an officer of the Order of the British Empire, O.B.E. for services to cricket.

== Sources ==
- Chappell, I. (1972), Tigers among the Lions, Lynton Publications: Coromandel Valley. ISBN 0 86946 072 2.
- Hogan P: The Tigers Of Old, Richmond FC, Melbourne 1996
