= Frankston Bombers Football Netball Club =

Frankston Bombers

Names
- Full name: Frankston Bombers Football Netball Club
- Nickname: Bombers

Club details
- Founded: 1887; 139 years ago
- Colours
- Competition: MPNFL
- President: Jason Smith
- Premierships: (17): 1911, 1919, 1922, 1923, 1929, 1931, 1937, 1938, 1939, 1941, 1946, 1947, 1949, 1952, 1961, 1991, 2009
- Ground: Baxter Park

Uniforms
Home

Other information
- Official website: frankstonbombers.com.au

The Frankston Bombers Football Netball Club is an Australian rules football and netball club based in the southeastern region of Victoria, Australia. The football squad competes in the Mornington Peninsula Nepean Football League (MPNFL). Frankston has been responsible for the development of Australian football on the Mornington Peninsula since 1887.

== History ==
It is believed that J.C. "Jack" Sadleir was the founder of the club in 1887. The first reported match took place against Mornington. Frankston won the game by 4 goals to nil. Games were arranged between a group of teams across the Peninsula including Hastings and Mornington. Sadleir brought with him the black-with-red-sash guernsey. In the early years and right into the mid 1900s, Frankston was known as the “Red and Blacks.”

=== Peninsula Football Association ===
Frankston was one of five founding members of the Peninsula Football Association in 1908. In the inaugural season It lost the first Grand Final to Hastings. Frankston were Premiers in 1911, 1919, 1922, 1923, and 1931.

=== Mornington Peninsula Football League ===
At the end of the 1933 season, the Peninsula Football Association merged with the Peninsula District Football Association to form the Mornington Peninsula Football League. Frankston were MPFL Premiers in 1937, 1938, 1939, 1941, 1949, 1952 and 1961.

=== Victorian Football Association ===
In 1966, Frankston entered the Victorian Football Association Second Division. Its departure from the MPFL was acrimonious, with the MPFL refusing on three occasions over two years to grant the club the necessary clearance. In 1966 Frankston separated to form two clubs. Frankston (Later to become Frankston Dolphins) join the VFA, & Frankston Peninsula (Later to become Frankston Bombers) would continue to play in the MPFL. In 1975, Frankston Peninsula & Frankston Rovers amalgamate to become the Frankston Bombers Football Club.

=== Frankston Rovers ===
The Rovers formed and were originally called Bruce Park in 1963; they renamed themselves the Frankston Rovers in 1966. The club struggled on-field until it merged with Frankston Peninsula to form the Frankston Bombers in 1975.

=== Post-merger ===
In 1981, the new clubrooms at Baxter Park were opened. The club has won two premierships since the merger: 1991 and 2009.

== Premierships ==
- 1911, 1919, 1922, 1923, 1929, 1931, 1937, 1938, 1939, 1941, 1946, 1947, 1949, 1952, 1961, 1991, 2009
