= Brendan McCormack =

Australian rules footballer

Personal information
- Born: 28 June 1970 (age 56)
- Original team: East Doncaster
- Height: 187 cm (6 ft 2 in)
- Weight: 115 kg (254 lb)

Playing career^{1}
Years	Club	Games (Goals)
1989–1992	Fitzroy	44 (26)
1993–1994	Brisbane Bears	12 (9)
Total		56 (35)
- ^{1} Playing statistics correct to the end of 1994.

Brendan McCormack (born 28 June 1970) is a former Australian rules footballer who played with Fitzroy and the Brisbane Bears in the AFL during the early 1990s.
