= Ed Considine =

Australian rules footballer

Personal information
- Full name: Edward J. Considine
- Born: 19 September 1968 (age 58)
- Original team: St Joseph's (North Melbourne)
- Height: 186 cm (6 ft 1 in)
- Weight: 85 kg (187 lb)

Playing career^{1}
Years	Club	Games (Goals)
1986–1992	Essendon	49 (12)
1993–1995	Sydney	28 (6)
Total		77 (18)
- ^{1} Playing statistics correct to the end of 1995.

Edward "Ed" Considine (born 19 September 1968) is a former Australian rules footballer who played with Essendon and Sydney in the Victorian/Australian Football League (VFL/AFL).

Considine played his early football for St Joseph's and Strathmore. An All-Australian at Teal Cup level, he made his league debut in 1986 but could only put together semi regular games and spent much of his time in the reserves.

Often used as a half back flanker, Considine moved to Sydney in 1993 via a trade and in 1994 played 15 games, his best return. He retired after playing six AFL games in 1995.
