= Steven Clark (Australian footballer) =

Australian rules footballer (1961–2005)

Personal information
- Full name: Steven Clark
- Born: 5 May 1961
- Died: 12 November 2005 (aged 44); Diamond Creek
- Original team: Bulleen-Templestowe
- Height: 173 cm (5 ft 8 in)
- Weight: 76 kg (168 lb)
- Position: Rover

Playing career^{1}
Years	Club	Games (Goals)
1985–89	Essendon	53 (73)
1990–91	Melbourne	21 (17)
1992	St Kilda	6 (7)
Total		80 (97)
- ^{1} Playing statistics correct to the end of 1992.

Steven Clark (5 May 1961 – 12 November 2005) was an Australian rules footballer who played with Essendon, Melbourne and St Kilda in the Australian Football League (AFL), previously Victorian Football League (VFL).

Clark was a rover who had originally trialed with Fitzroy but was recruited to Essendon by Kevin Sheedy midway through the 1985 VFL season, despite being aged 24. He participated in four games that year, including the last two of the home and away season but missed out on the finals and subsequent premiership.

A strong season in 1986 saw Clark picked to play for the Victorian interstate team. He kicked 33 goals for the year, the third most at Essendon. This included a career best five goals in a win over Geelong at Windy Hill. His form wavered the following season but in 1988 he played well enough to kick 22 goals. He managed just three games in 1989 and was traded to Melbourne.

While he struggled to make it onto the field for Essendon due to the strength of the team, it was looking like he would become a regular at Melbourne as he appeared in the first three games of the 1990 AFL season, but he then suffered a serious knee injury. On his debut with Melbourne he had received two Brownlow Medal votes for three goals and 20 disposals against North Melbourne. He missed the rest of the season but came back in 1991 to play 18 of a possible 22 games but wasn't picked for Melbourne's finals series. For the second time in his career, Clark was traded and ended up at St Kilda, where he spent just one season.

In 2003 he was diagnosed with a growth on his pancreas, and despite being given only a few months to live, he survived for 2 more years.
