= John McCarthy (Australian footballer, born 1967) =

Australian rules footballer

Personal information
- Born: 30 March 1967 (age 59); Pontypridd, Wales
- Original team: North Hobart (TANFL)
- Height: 185 cm (6 ft 1 in)
- Weight: 89 kg (196 lb)

Playing career^{1}
Years	Club	Games (Goals)
1986–1992	North Melbourne	92 (101)
1993–1996	Fitzroy	71 (77)
Total		163 (178)
- ^{1} Playing statistics correct to the end of 1996.

John Frederick George McCarthy (born 30 March 1967) is a former Australian rules footballer who played with North Melbourne and Fitzroy in the VFL/AFL. Originally from Wales, McCarthy is one of the most successful Australian rules football players to have been born overseas. Between 1989 and 1993 he represented Tasmania regularly at interstate football.

McCarthy grew up in Tasmania and played his early football with North Hobart and developed into a key position player. He debuted in the VFL for North Melbourne in 1986 and spent seven seasons with the club. In 1993 he moved to Fitzroy and kicked 40 goals in his debut season.
