= Greg Eppelstun =

Australian rules footballer, born 1966

Personal information
- Born: 16 November 1966 (age 59)
- Original team: Won Wron Woodside
- Height: 185 cm (6 ft 1 in)
- Weight: 82 kg (181 lb)

Playing career^{1}
| Years | Club | Games (Goals) |
| 1986–1992 | Footscray | 102 (1) |
| 1993 | North Melbourne | 1 (0) |
| Total | | 103 (1) |
- ^{1} Playing statistics correct to the end of 1993.

Greg Eppelstun (born 16 November 1966) is a former Australian rules footballer in the VFL/AFL.

== Footscray career ==
Debuting with the Footscray Football Club in 1986, he was a reliable defender from Won Wron Woodside who went on to play 102 games (for 1 goal), and represented Victoria in State of Origin football in 1991.

== North Melbourne career ==
After only playing one game for Footscray midway through the 1992 season, in which he earned a Brownlow Medal vote as the third best player on the ground, Eppelstun was dropped back to the reserves for the remainder of the season. He then transferred to the North Melbourne Football Club for the 1993 season. He played the opening round of the 1993 AFL season for North, making his debut together with future North Melbourne coach Dean Laidley and 300-game player John Blakey. He injured his groin during the match and was replaced the next week by future 300 game player, Glenn Archer. He struggled with injury throughout the rest of the year and retired at the end of the season without playing another AFL game.
