= Drew Banfield =

Australian rules footballer, born 1974

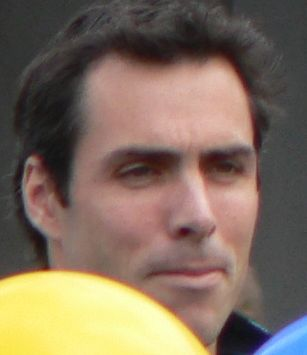
- Banfield with West Coast in September 2006

Personal information
- Full name: Drew Anthony Banfield
- Born: 27 February 1974 (age 52)
- Original team: Subiaco (WAFL)
- Draft: No. 1, 1992 National Draft, West Coast
- Debut: Round 16, 1993, West Coast vs. Essendon, at Melbourne Cricket Ground
- Height: 184 cm (6 ft 0 in)
- Weight: 88 kg (194 lb)
- Position: Defender/Utility

Playing career^{1}
Years	Club	Games (Goals)
1992–2006	Subiaco	32 (11)
1993–2006	West Coast	265 (76)
Total		297 (87)
- ^{1} Playing statistics correct to the end of 2006.

Career highlights
- 2× AFL premiership player: 1994, 2006; West Coast Club Champion: 1996; 2x Ross Glendinning Medal: 1997, 2001; AFL Rising Star nominee: 1994

Drew Anthony Banfield (born 27 February 1974) is a former Australian rules footballer who played for the West Coast Eagles in the Australian Football League (AFL).

Selected as the number 1 pick in the 1992 AFL draft, Banfield was recruited to West Coast Eagles where he appeared at the 1994 and the 2006 AFL Grand Finals. Twice recognized for his sportsmanship, he was awarded the Eagles' Club Champion Award in 1996 and shared the runner-up vote in 1999.

In 2006, Banfield was struggling for selection and fought his way into the side in round 9, but remained on the fringes of selection throughout the season. He missed out on the semi-final against the Western Bulldogs but was recalled for the preliminary final against Adelaide, and retained for the Grand Final against Sydney due to his experience. It was his second AFL premiership, twelve years after his first, and made him the only player to appear in both West Coast's 1994 and 2006 premiership teams. On 6 October 2006, Banfield announced his retirement from AFL football at the West Coast Eagles Club Champion awards, having played 265 games.

Banfield is married to Amber Lee-Steere and has four children, three sons, Bailey (not to be confused with Bailey Banfield of the Fremantle Football Club), Charlie and Harper, and Willow. Charlie was drafted by St Kilda Football Club in 2025 and made his AFL debut in the 2026 AFL season.

== Statistics ==
Legend
G	Goals	K	Kicks	D	Disposals	T	Tackles
B	Behinds	H	Handballs	M	Marks

Season	Team	No.	Games	Totals							Averages (per game)						
Season	Team	No.	Games	G	B	K	H	D	M	T	G	B	K	H	D	M	T
1993	West Coast	31	7	2	2	57	19	76	14	9	0.3	0.3	8.1	2.7	10.9	2.0	1.3
1994†	West Coast	6	24	7	4	192	116	308	39	46	0.3	0.2	8.0	4.8	12.8	1.6	1.9
1995	West Coast	6	23	6	7	180	179	359	53	48	0.3	0.3	7.8	7.8	15.6	2.3	2.1
1996	West Coast	6	24	9	3	240	220	460	72	48	0.4	0.1	10.0	9.2	19.2	3.0	2.0
1997	West Coast	6	21	14	8	229	176	405	70	53	0.7	0.4	10.9	8.4	19.3	3.3	2.5
1998	West Coast	6	22	11	4	217	148	365	60	51	0.5	0.2	9.9	6.7	16.6	2.7	2.3
1999	West Coast	6	24	6	8	259	173	432	59	18	0.3	0.3	10.8	7.2	18.0	2.5	0.8
2000	West Coast	6	17	6	3	162	138	300	44	40	0.4	0.2	9.5	8.1	17.6	2.6	2.4
2001	West Coast	6	9	4	1	76	69	145	24	23	0.4	0.1	8.4	7.7	16.1	2.7	2.6
2002	West Coast	6	22	1	2	168	123	291	55	56	0.0	0.1	7.6	5.6	13.2	2.5	2.5
2003	West Coast	6	22	3	4	145	142	287	54	38	0.1	0.2	6.6	6.5	13.0	2.5	1.7
2004	West Coast	6	11	2	0	110	56	166	42	21	0.2	0.0	10.0	5.1	15.1	3.8	1.9
2005	West Coast	6	25	3	2	197	145	342	90	46	0.1	0.1	7.9	5.8	13.7	3.6	1.8
2006†	West Coast	6	14	2	0	106	88	194	53	27	0.1	0.0	7.6	6.3	13.9	3.8	1.9
Career			265	76	48	2338	1792	4130	729	524	0.3	0.2	8.8	6.8	15.6	2.8	2.0
