= Scott Watters =

Australian rules footballer and coach

Personal information
- Full name: Scott Watters
- Born: 25 January 1969 (age 57)
- Original team: South Fremantle (WAFL)
- Draft: No. 5, 1988 pre-draft selection
- Height: 175 cm (5 ft 9 in)
- Weight: 82 kg (181 lb)

Playing career^{1}
Years	Club	Games (Goals)
1989–1999	South Fremantle	91 (35)
1989–1992	West Coast	46 (13)
1993–1994	Sydney	37 (11)
1995–1996	Fremantle	26 (6)
Total		200 (65)

Representative team honours^{2}
Years	Team	Games (Goals)
1988–1993	Western Australia	6 (3)

Coaching career^{3}
Years	Club	Games (W–L–D)
2007–2009	Subiaco	68 (53–15–0)
2008–2009	Western Australia	2 (2–0–0)
2012–2013	St Kilda	44 (17–27–0)
- ^{1} Playing statistics correct to the end of 1996.^{2} Representative statistics correct as of 1993.^{3} Coaching statistics correct as of 2013.

Career highlights
- Fremantle vice-captain 1995; South Fremantle best and fairest 1987; Subiaco premiership coach (2008)

Scott Watters (born 25 January 1969) is a former Australian rules football player and coach. As a player, he was drafted from the South Fremantle Football Club in the West Australian Football League (WAFL) to the West Coast Eagles in the Australian Football League (AFL) in 1988. He later played for the Sydney Swans and Fremantle. He was a member of the 1985 Teal Cup winning side, the first year that Western Australia had won the national championships. As a coach, he started his career in 2006 with WAFL team Subiaco, followed by a stint as an assistant coach with the Collingwood Football Club from 2010 to 2011. Watters then became the senior coach of the St Kilda Football Club, following Ross Lyon's departure, for two seasons from 2012 to 2013.

== Early life ==
Watters attended All Saints' College. He later helped coach the College's football teams.

== Playing career ==
=== West Coast Eagles ===
Watters was selected as a pre-draft selection in the 1988 VFL Draft by West Coast Eagles after he won the fairest and best award for South Fremantle in 1987. He played 46 games for the Eagles over the next four seasons, including their first ever grand final appearance in 1991. However, when he was not selected in the 1992 premiership team, he was traded to Sydney Swans as part of a deal which gave the Eagles the Number 1 draft pick, which they used to select Drew Banfield.

Watters played for West Coast Eagles from 1989 until 1992 for a total of 46 games and kicked a total of 13 goals.

=== Sydney Swans ===
After Watters was traded to the Sydney Swans, the reduction in public pressure in a non-AFL city and an injury free period saw Watters play some of his best football in the 37 games he played for the club. His good form in his first season was recognised with being runner-up in the Swans' best and fairest award; further, he earned three Brownlow Medal votes in the club's only win of the 1993 season, against Melbourne in round 13.

Watters played for Sydney Swans from 1993 until 1994 for a total of 37 games and kicked a total of 11 goals.

=== Fremantle ===
With the entry of the second Western Australian team in 1995, Watters joined the Fremantle Dockers and was the first vice-captain of the club. Injuries, however, would take their toll and at the end of the 1996 season he retired from AFL football.

Watters played for Fremantle from 1995 until 1996 for a total of 26 games and kicked a total of 6 goals.

=== South Fremantle (WAFL) ===
He continued to play for South Fremantle until the 1998 season, when he retired with a total of 207 senior games, 109 in the AFL, 92 in the WAFL and six for Western Australia. He is a member of the West Australian Football Two Hundred Club.

== Commentating career ==
After retiring as a player, Watters spent time as a radio commentator with Perth radio station 6PR.

== Coaching career ==
=== Early coaching career ===
In 2006, Watters was appointed the coach of the Subiaco Football Club colts team. In November 2006 he was appointed the league coach, after Peter German accepted an assistant coaching position with the Fremantle Football Club.

=== Collingwood Football Club assistant coach (2010-2011) ===
In late 2009, Watters signed with the Collingwood Football Club as an assistant coach under senior coach Mick Malthouse for seasons 2010 and 2011 and was part of the clubs 2010 premiership coaching panel.

=== St Kilda Football Club senior coach (2012-2013) ===
At the conclusion of the 2011 season, Watters was appointed the senior coach of the St Kilda Football Club, following the resignation of Ross Lyon. In Watters's first season as senior coach of the St Kilda Football club, in the 2012 season, The Saints under Watters finished ninth with twelve wins and ten losses, but they just missed out of the finals. But the Saints under Watters endured a miserable 2013 season to finish in sixteenth (third-last) place on the ladder with only five wins. Watters was sacked as St Kilda Football Club senior coach on 1 November 2013, at the end of the 2013 season. Watters was then replaced by Alan Richardson as St Kilda Football Club senior coach.

St Kilda Football Club President Peter Summers attributed that the club came to the decision to sack Watters, after a club review conducted by board member Andrew Thompson.
