= Ricky Spargo =

Australian rules footballer

Personal information
- Full name: Richard Allan Spargo
- Born: 21 August 1947 (age 79)
- Height: 175 cm (5 ft 9 in)
- Weight: 75 kg (165 lb)
- Position: Rover / Wing

Playing career^{1}
Years	Club	Games (Goals)
1966–71	Footscray	64 (65)
- ^{1} Playing statistics correct to the end of 1971.

Ricky Spargo (born 21 August 1947) is a former Australian rules footballer who played with Footscray in the Victorian Football League (VFL).

Like his father Bob senior who had run third in both the 1936 and 1940 Stawell Gift finals, Ricky was also a well performed professional runner, finishing fifth in the 1974 Stawell Gift final.

== Notes ==
- Watt, Gary (2008). Stawell Gift Almanac 1st ed. Legacy Books. Page 217.
