= Paul Spargo =

Australian rules footballer and coach

Personal information
- Born: 9 October 1966 (age 60)
- Original team: Albury (OMFL)
- Height: 182 cm (6 ft 0 in)
- Weight: 82 kg (181 lb)

Playing career^{1}
Years	Club	Games (Goals)
1985–1992	North Melbourne	81 (109)
1993	Brisbane Bears	9 (9)
Total		90 (118)
- ^{1} Playing statistics correct to the end of 1993.

Paul Spargo (born 9 October 1966) is a former Australian rules footballer who played with North Melbourne and the Brisbane Bears in the Australian Football League (AFL). A half forward, he is the son of Footscray's Grand Final player Bob Spargo. His own son Charlie Spargo plays for North Melbourne.

Originally from Albury, Spargo returned to coach the Albury Football Club in 1994, leading the team to the first of consecutive Ovens & Murray Football League (O&MFL) premierships the following year. He left in 1997, but returned for a year in 2002. Between 2003 and 2004 he was an assistant coach at the Richmond Football Club in the Australian Football League (AFL). In 2009, he again returned to Albury, and lead them to three consecutive premierships, becoming the first man to coach five O&MFL premiership teams.
