= Peter German =

Australian rules football player and coach (born 1965)

- German in July 2025

General Manager of Northern Bullants (known as Preston from 20 August 2025)
- In office 24 March 2025 – 21 October 2025
- Preceded by: Darren Bassett
- Succeeded by: Club liquidated

Personal details
- Born: Peter German; 2 February 1965 (age 61)
Australian rules football career
Personal information
- Nickname: Germo
- Original team: Oak Park
- Height: 182 cm (6 ft 0 in)
- Weight: 84 kg (185 lb)
- Position: Rover/midfielder
Playing career
Years	Club	Games (Goals)
1984–1994	North Melbourne	185 (201)
Representative team honours
Years	Team	Games (Goals)
1991	Victoria 2nd XVIII	2 (1)
Coaching career
Years	Club	Games (W–L–D)
1995–1997	Burnie Dockers	63 (46–17–0)
1998–1999	Hawthorn reserves	40 (12–28–0)
2002	Peel Thunder	18 (7–11–0)
2003–2007	Subiaco	88 (71–17–0)
2009	Casey	19 (10–9–0)
2010–2013	Williamstown	83 (58–24–1) (Note: This does not include Foxtel Cup matches, where Williamstown had a record of 5–1 (4–0 in 2011 and 0–1 in 2012) under German.)
2014–2017	Coburg	72 (20–52–0)
2019	Albury	4 (3–1–0)
2021–2022	Corowa-Rutherglen	31 (11–20–0)
2023–2024	Perth	34 (6–27–1)
Career highlights
- 2x WAFL premiership coach: 2004, 2006; VFL Coach of the Year: 2009; Foxtel Cup-winning coach: 2011; North Melbourne Football Club life member; Victorian Football League life member

Peter German (born 2 February 1965) is an Australian rules football coach and former player. He played 185 matches for North Melbourne in the Victorian/Australian Football League (VFL/AFL) between 1984 and 1994.

Since retiring as a player, German has served as the senior coach of nine clubs across four different states. He is a two-time premiership-winning coach in the West Australian Football League (WAFL) and a life member of the Victorian Football League (VFL).

== Career ==
Recruited from Oak Park, German made his debut for North Melbourne in the Victorian Football League (VFL) – later renamed to the Australian Football League (AFL) – in round 19 of the 1984 season against Hawthorn at Arden Street Oval. He became a regular member of the senior team in 1985, playing primarily as a rover and midfielder.

In 1991, German played for the Victoria "B" team in two interstate representative matches against Tasmania and Queensland. He retired from the AFL at the conclusion of the 1994 season after 201 goals in 185 games.

German's first coaching role was in 1995 in the Tasmanian Statewide League, where he was the inaugural captain-coach of the Burnie Dockers (the Burnie Hawks and Burnie Tigers had merged at the end of the 1993 season, but had still competed as the Burnie Hawks in 1994). The Dockers reached the grand final in 1996 and 1997, but were defeated by Clarence on both occasions.

German returned to Victoria to coach Hawthorn's reserves team in 1998 and 1999. Hawthorn finished second-last on the ladder in both seasons, with the AFL reserves competition disbanded and merged into the Victorian Football League (VFL) – formerly known as the Victorian Football Association (VFA) – at the end of the 1999 season. He was an assistant coach at the West Coast Eagles in 2000 and 2001.

In 2002, German served as the head coach of Peel Thunder in the West Australian Football League (WAFL) and played nine senior matches; the club finished tenth on the ladder with seven wins from eighteen matches. He moved to Subiaco the following year, coaching the club to a minor premiership before being defeated by West Perth in the 2003 grand final. Subiaco defeated Claremont by 48 points in the 2004 grand final to claim its first senior premiership since 1988. The club reached the preliminary final in 2005 before making a second grand final under German in 2006, defeating South Fremantle by 83 points. He coached Western Australia in a representative match against South Australia in 2006.

German returned to the AFL system in 2007 as an assistant coach at the Fremantle Football Club, before choosing not seek an extension of his contract at the end of the 2008 season in order to return to family in Melbourne. In 2009, German was appointed senior coach of the Casey Scorpions in the VFL for the club's first season under a new reserves affiliation with the Melbourne Football Club. He was named VFL Coach of the Year after the Scorpions finished sixth on the ladder and reached the finals series. German held "informal talks" with North Melbourne about becoming its AFL coach, but the club ultimately appointed Brad Scott to fill the position.

Ahead of the 2010 season, the Western Bulldogs recruited German to serve as a development coach and the senior coach of Williamstown, its then-affiliate in the VFL. Williamstown finished as minor premiers in 2010, earning qualification for the inaugural Foxtel Cup tournament in 2011, which it won. Williamstown also reached the 2011 VFL grand final but were defeated by Port Melbourne, who achieved a perfect season.

The Western Bulldogs ended its reserves affiliation with Williamstown at the end of the 2013 season and German moved to the Coburg Football Club, who had itself ended its alignment with Richmond. He was Coburg's senior coach for four years, during which the club never finished higher than twelfth on the ladder, although four players from the club were drafted to the AFL during this period.

After taking a break from coaching in 2018, German moved to the Ovens & Murray Football Netball League (OMFNL) for the 2019 season to serve as the senior coach of the Albury Tigers under a three-year contract. His tenure only lasted four matches (including three wins) before a "mutual decision" was made for him to depart the club, with The Border Mail reporting that a fallout with senior players was behind his departure.

German moved to Queensland in late 2019 to become the football manager of the North Cairns Tigers in the AFL Cairns competition. After one year, he returned to the OMFNL to coach Corowa-Rutherglen, which finished seventh in 2021 and eighth in 2022.

In September 2022, German returned to the WAFL as the senior coach of the Perth Football Club on a three-year deal. The club finished second-last on the ladder under German in both 2023 and 2024. He announced his resignation with one year remaining on his contract on 13 August 2024, with assistant coach Mark Stone replacing him for the remaining two matches of the season.

German returned to Victoria in 2025 and became the general manager of the Northern Bullants in the VFL. The club won only two matches during the year and had its licence revoked at the end of the season, with the VFL citing "on-field competitiveness and off-field financial liability" as factors in the decision. German left the Bullants on 21 October 2025 as a direct result of the licence termination, with the club entering voluntary liquidation two months later.

== Statistics ==
=== Coaching statistics ===
Legend
W	Wins	L	Losses	D	Draws	W%	Winning percentage	LP	Ladder position	LT	League teams

Season	Team	League	Games	W	L	D	W %	Ladder
1995	Burnie Dockers	TFL	20	12	8	0	60.0%	5 / 11
1996	Burnie Dockers	TFL	23	17	6	0	73.9%	2 / 11
1997	Burnie Dockers	TFL	20	17	3	0	85.0%	1 / 11
1998	Hawthorn	AFL (R)	20	6	14	0	30.0%	10 / 11
1999	Hawthorn	AFL (R)	20	6	14	0	30.0%	10 / 11
2002	Peel Thunder	WAFL	18	7	11	0	38.9%	8 / 9
2003	Subiaco	WAFL	22	16	6	0	72.7%	1 / 9
2004	Subiaco	WAFL	22	17	5	0	77.3%	1 / 9
2005	Subiaco	WAFL	22	18	4	0	81.8%	1 / 9
2006	Subiaco	WAFL	22	20	2	0	90.9%	1 / 9
2009	Casey	VFL	19	10	9	0	52.6%	6 / 13
2010	Williamstown	VFL	20	16	4	0	80.0%	1 / 14
2011	Williamstown	VFL	21	16	5	0	76.2%	2 / 13
2012	Williamstown	VFL	21	13	7	1	61.9%	5 / 13
2013	Williamstown	VFL	21	13	8	0	61.9%	3 / 14
2014	Coburg	VFL	18	5	13	0	27.8%	14 / 16
2015	Coburg	VFL	18	7	11	0	38.9%	12 / 15
2016	Coburg	VFL	18	6	12	0	33.3%	12 / 15
2017	Coburg	VFL	18	2	16	0	11.1%	13 / 14
2019	Albury	OMFNL	4	3	1	0	75.0%	—
2021	Corowa-Rutherglen	OMFNL	13	5	8	0	38.5%	7 / 10
2022	Corowa-Rutherglen	OMFNL	18	6	12	0	33.3%	8 / 10
2023	Perth	WAFL	18	2	15	1	11.1%	9 / 10
2024	Perth	WAFL	16	4	12	0	25.0%	—
