= Heath Shephard =

Australian rules footballer

Personal information
- Full name: Heath Shephard
- Born: 7 September 1969 (age 57)
- Original team: Robinvale (SFL)
- Draft: No. 109 (F/S), 1988 national draft
- Height: 179 cm (5 ft 10 in)
- Weight: 73 kg (161 lb)

Playing career^{1}
Years	Club	Games (Goals)
1989–1990	Collingwood	11 (16)
1992	Brisbane Bears	4 (1)
Total		15 (17)
- ^{1} Playing statistics correct to the end of 1992.

Heath Shephard (born 7 September 1969) is a former Australian rules footballer who played with Collingwood and the Brisbane Bears in the Victorian/Australian Football League (VFL/AFL).

Born in Tasmania, Shephard was playing with Sunraysia Football League club Robinvale when Collingwood drafted him under the Father–son rule, as his Graeme had played at the club in the early 1970s.

Shephard had a memorable VFL debut, against the Brisbane Bears at Victoria Park in the third round of the 1989 season. His 18 disposals included five goals and five behinds. He kicked another two goals the following week but his form then dropped off and he finished the season with nine games to his name.

In 1990, Collingwood broke their premiership drought and Shephard, having played only twice that year due to a loss of form and a broken arm, returned to Tasmania.

Shephard spent the 1991 season with the Burnie Hawks in the TFL Statewide League and returned to the AFL the following year, joining Brisbane. Perhaps influenced by Shephard's debut performance, which had come against them, the Bears used the 65th selection of the national draft to pick him up.

Shephard's stint in Brisbane was unsuccessful, managing just four senior games. He continued playing football in Victoria and topped the goal-kicking for West Preston Lakeside on three occasions.
