= 1994 TFL Statewide League season =

- Teams: Burnie Hawks; Clarence Kangaroos; Devonport Blues; Glenorchy Magpies; Hobart Tigers; Launceston Raiders; New Norfolk Eagles; North Hobart Demons; North Launceston Robins; Sandy Bay Seagulls; South Launceston Bulldogs
- Premiers: Clarence
- Minor premiers: Clarence; 8th minor premiership

Attendance
- Matches played: 105
- Total attendance: 144,535 (1,377 per match)

The 1994 TFL Statewide League premiership season was an Australian rules football competition, staged across Tasmania, Australia over twenty roster rounds and six finals series matches between 9 April and 24 September 1994.

This was the ninth season of statewide football and the League was known as the Cascade-Boags Draught Super League under a dual commercial naming-rights sponsorship agreement with both Cascade Brewery in Hobart and Boag's Brewery in Launceston.

== Participating Clubs ==
- Burnie Hawks Football Club
- Clarence District Football Club
- Devonport Football Club
- Glenorchy District Football Club
- Hobart Football Club
- Launceston Football Club
- New Norfolk District Football Club
- North Hobart Football Club
- North Launceston Football Club
- Sandy Bay Football Club
- South Launceston Football Club

=== 1994 TFL Statewide League Club Coaches ===
- Mark Lee (Burnie Hawks)
- Stevie Wright (Clarence)
- Andy Goodwin (Devonport)
- Kim Excell (Glenorchy)
- Wayne Petterd (Hobart)
- Peter Chisnall (Launceston)
- Darren Dennemann (New Norfolk)
- Andy Bennett (North Hobart)
- Robert Groenewegen (North Launceston)
- Chris Fagan (Sandy Bay)
- Dale Weightman (South Launceston)

=== TFL Statewide League Reserves Grand Final ===
- Sandy Bay 12.21 (93) v Nth Hobart 10.5 (65) – North Hobart Oval

=== TFL Statewide League Colts (Under-19's) Grand Final ===
- New Norfolk 11.15 (81) v Burnie Hawks 9.6 (60) – North Hobart Oval

Note: This season saw a Northern & Southern Colts Final, the premiers of each met in the Statewide Final.

=== TFL Fourths (Under-17's) Grand Final ===
- Glenorchy 5.10 (40) v New Norfolk 5.8 (38)

=== Leading Goalkickers: TFL Statewide League ===
- Paul Dac (Clarence) – 94

=== Medal Winners ===
- Michael Maple (North Hobart) – William Leitch Medal
- Jason Wilton (New Norfolk) – Darrel Baldock Medal (Best player in TFL Grand Final)
- Stephen Jackson (Burnie Hawks) – George Watt Medal (Reserves)
- Aaron Priest (Clarence) & Jonathon Alexander (Sth Launceston) – V.A Geard Medal (Under-19's)
- Damian Triffitt (New Norfolk) – D.R Plaister Medal (Under-17's)
- Daniel Hulm (Clarence) – Lefroy Medal (Best player in Interstate match)
- Shane Smith (Devonport) – Bob Withers Medal (Best player in Tasmania v Richmond game)

=== Interstate Matches ===
Exhibition Match (Saturday, 30 April 1994)

- Richmond 17.13 (115) v Tasmania 14.7 (91) – Att: 4,108 at North Hobart Oval
- Queensland 18.18 (126) v Tasmania 10.10 (70) – Brisbane

== 1994 TFL Statewide League Ladder ==
Pos	Team	Pld	W	L	D	PF	PA	PP	Pts
1	Clarence	18	13	5	0	1977	1542	128.2	52
2	Sandy Bay	18	12	6	0	2128	1624	131.0	48
3	New Norfolk	18	12	6	0	1900	1590	119.5	48
4	Devonport	18	11	7	0	1736	1491	116.4	44
5	Burnie Hawks	18	11	7	0	1802	1752	102.9	44
6	Glenorchy	18	10	8	0	1640	1412	116.1	40
7	North Hobart	18	10	8	0	1649	1571	105.0	40
8	North Launceston	18	9	8	1	1870	1499	124.7	38
9	South Launceston	18	7	11	0	1878	1979	94.9	28
10	Hobart	18	3	14	1	1508	1811	83.3	14
11	Launceston	18	0	18	0	1209	3026	40.0	0

=== Round 1 ===
(Saturday, 9 April & Sunday, 10 April 1994)

- Sandy Bay 14.15 (99) v Burnie Hawks 11.14 (80) – Att: 728 at North Hobart Oval
- Clarence 17.11 (113) v Nth Hobart 8.14 (62) – Att: 1,554 at Bellerive Oval
- Glenorchy 18.17 (125) v New Norfolk 15.12 (102) – Att: 1,533 at Boyer Oval
- Hobart 12.15 (87) v Devonport 12.10 (82) – Att: 1,038 at Devonport Oval
- Sth Launceston 33.15 (213) v Launceston 6.13 (49) – Att: 1,250 at York Park (Sunday)
- Bye: Nth Launceston.

=== Round 2 ===
(Saturday, 16 April 1994)

- Nth Hobart 18.10 (118) v Hobart 13.4 (82) – Att: 1,698 at North Hobart Oval
- New Norfolk 28.20 (188) v Launceston 6.8 (44) – Att: 956 at Boyer Oval
- Sandy Bay 16.12 (108) v Nth Launceston 14.19 (103) – Att: 901 at York Park
- Sth Launceston 19.10 (124) v Clarence 17.17 (119) – Att: 666 at Youngtown Memorial Ground *
- Burnie Hawks 17.15 (117) v Devonport 10.9 (69) – Att: 2,299 at West Park Oval (Night)
- Bye: Glenorchy.

Note: Sth Launceston sets record for greatest comeback victory, trailing by 78-points (4.6 to 16.12) during the third quarter.

=== Round 3 ===
(Saturday, 23 April & Sunday, 24 April 1994)

- Sandy Bay 25.12 (162) v Hobart 17.14 (116) – Att: 1,303 at North Hobart Oval
- Burnie Hawks 12.18 (90) v Glenorchy 12.16 (88) – Att: 1,309 at KGV Football Park
- Clarence 14.9 (93) v Nth Launceston 13.10 (88) – Att: 1,244 at Bellerive Oval
- Devonport 24.20 (164) v Launceston 11.7 (73) – Att: 1,088 at Devonport Oval
- New Norfolk 20.8 (128) v Nth Hobart 9.5 (59) – Att: 1,895 at Boyer Oval (Sunday)
- Bye: Sth Launceston.

=== Round 4 ===
(Saturday, 7 May & Sunday, 8 May 1994)

- New Norfolk 23.13 (151) v Hobart 12.10 (82) – Att: 1,007 at North Hobart Oval
- Devonport 18.15 (123) v Sth Launceston 17.18 (120) – Att: 921 at Youngtown Memorial Ground
- Burnie Hawks 15.16 (106) v Nth Hobart 10.15 (75) – Att: 1,007 at West Park Oval
- Glenorchy 17.12 (114) v Sandy Bay 9.14 (68) – Att: 1,520 at KGV Football Park (Sunday)
- Nth Launceston 27.26 (188) v Launceston 7.8 (50) – Att: 821 at York Park (Sunday)
- Bye: Clarence.

=== Round 5 ===
(Saturday, 14 May & Sunday, 15 May 1994)

- Sandy Bay 18.10 (118) v Clarence 10.12 (72) – Att: 1,520 at North Hobart Oval
- Hobart 13.14 (92) v Nth Launceston 11.20 (86) – Att: 801 at York Park
- Sth Launceston 20.13 (133) v Burnie Hawks 13.10 (88) – Att: 847 at Youngtown Memorial Ground
- New Norfolk 14.20 (104) v Devonport 12.8 (80) – Att: 1,209 at Devonport Oval
- Nth Hobart 18.11 (119) v Glenorchy 15.14 (104) – Att: 2,031 at North Hobart Oval (Sunday)
- Bye: Launceston.

=== Round 6 ===
(Saturday, 21 May 1994)

- Sth Launceston 12.22 (94) v Hobart 10.15 (75) – Att: 1,013 at North Hobart Oval
- Glenorchy 14.24 (108) v Devonport 8.11 (59) – Att: 1,062 at KGV Football Park
- Nth Launceston 17.23 (125) v New Norfolk 11.10 (76) – Att: 1,386 at Boyer Oval
- Nth Hobart 15.21 (111) v Launceston 16.3 (99) – Att: 711 at Windsor Park
- Clarence 13.8 (86) v Burnie Hawks 9.12 (66) – Att: 756 at West Park Oval (Night)
- Bye: Sandy Bay.

=== Round 7 ===
(Saturday, 28 May & Sunday, 29 May 1994)

- Glenorchy 13.15 (93) v Hobart 10.10 (70) – Att: 1,007 at North Hobart Oval
- Clarence 18.18 (126) v Launceston 13.8 (86) – Att: 857 at Bellerive Oval
- New Norfolk 18.15 (123) v Sth Launceston 13.14 (92) – Att: 1,095 at Youngtown Memorial Ground
- Burnie Hawks 19.9 (123) v Nth Launceston 8.11 (59) – Att: 853 at West Park Oval
- Sandy Bay 16.5 (101) v Nth Hobart 10.8 (68) – Att: 1,332 at North Hobart Oval (Sunday)
- Bye: Devonport.

=== Round 8 ===
(Saturday, 4 June 1994)

- Burnie Hawks 16.14 (110) v Hobart 12.14 (86) – Att: 685 at North Hobart Oval
- Glenorchy 22.20 (152) v Sth Launceston 15.9 (99) – Att: 1,034 at KGV Football Park
- Nth Hobart 11.11 (77) v Nth Launceston 8.18 (66) – Att: 866 at York Park
- Sandy Bay 28.21 (189) v Launceston 5.12 (42) – Att: 805 at Windsor Park
- Devonport 14.13 (97) v Clarence 8.12 (60) – Att: 1,061 at Devonport Oval
- Bye: New Norfolk.

=== Round 9 ===
(Saturday, 11 June & Sunday, 12 June 1994)

- Nth Hobart 14.17 (101) v Devonport 12.14 (86) – Att: 1,023 at North Hobart Oval
- Glenorchy 13.12 (90) v Clarence 7.10 (52) – Att: 1,754 at KGV Football Park
- Burnie Hawks 23.20 (158) v Launceston 19.12 (126) – Att: 907 at West Park Oval
- Sandy Bay 21.14 (140) v New Norfolk 14.4 (88) – Att: 1,530 at Boyer Oval (Sunday)
- Nth Launceston 15.16 (106) v Sth Launceston 4.8 (32) – Att: 1,902 at Youngtown Memorial Ground (Sunday)
- Bye: Hobart.

=== Round 10 ===
(Saturday, 18 June & Sunday, 19 June 1994)

- Hobart 26.17 (173) v Launceston 12.7 (79) – Att: 660 at North Hobart Oval
- Nth Launceston 7.19 (61) v Glenorchy 7.11 (53) – Att: 1,301 at KGV Football Park
- Nth Hobart 14.15 (99) v Sth Launceston 11.14 (80) – Att: 803 at Youngtown Memorial Ground
- Devonport 15.9 (99) v Sandy Bay 12.15 (87) – Att: 1,116 at Devonport Oval
- Clarence 23.8 (146) v New Norfolk 9.10 (64) – Att: 2,014 at Bellerive Oval (Sunday)
- Bye: Burnie Hawks.

=== Round 11 ===
(Saturday, 25 June & Sunday, 26 June 1994)

- Sandy Bay 26.22 (178) v Sth Launceston 13.3 (81) – Att: 855 at North Hobart Oval
- New Norfolk 24.19 (163) v Burnie Hawks 16.14 (110) – Att: 844 at Boyer Oval
- Glenorchy 30.14 (194) v Launceston 14.6 (90) – Att: 720 at York Park
- Clarence 14.10 (94) v Hobart 11.19 (85) – Att: 979 at North Hobart Oval (Sunday)
- Devonport 17.14 (116) v Nth Launceston 8.8 (56) – Att: 1,825 at York Park (Sunday)
- Bye: Nth Hobart.

=== Round 12 ===
(Saturday, 2 July & Sunday, 3 July 1994)

- Devonport 13.13 (91) v Hobart 8.12 (60) – Att: 642 at North Hobart Oval
- Glenorchy 9.12 (66) v New Norfolk 8.14 (62) – Att: 1,758 at KGV Football Park
- Sth Launceston 32.20 (212) v Launceston 6.13 (49) – Att: 836 at Youngtown Memorial Ground
- Sandy Bay 26.19 (175) v Burnie Hawks 13.15 (93) – Att: 1,073 at West Park Oval
- Clarence 17.9 (111) v Nth Hobart 11.6 (72) – Att: 2,008 at North Hobart Oval (Sunday)
- Bye: Nth Launceston.

=== Round 13 ===
(Saturday, 9 July & Sunday, 10 July 1994)

- Nth Launceston 18.19 (127) v Sandy Bay 10.11 (71) – Att: 1,028 at North Hobart Oval
- Clarence 20.21 (141) v Sth Launceston 15.9 (99) – Att: 1,020 at Bellerive Oval
- New Norfolk 17.16 (118) v Launceston 15.11 (101) – Att: 506 at York Park
- Nth Hobart 11.11 (77) v Hobart 10.12 (72) – Att: 1,329 at North Hobart Oval (Sunday)
- Devonport 17.16 (118) v Burnie Hawks 4.9 (33) – Att: 2,674 at Devonport Oval (Sunday)
- Bye: Glenorchy.

=== Round 14 ===
(Saturday, 16 July & Sunday, 17 July 1994)

- New Norfolk 12.17 (89) v Nth Hobart 9.12 (66) – Att: 1,243 at North Hobart Oval
- Clarence 21.16 (142) v Nth Launceston 10.14 (74) – Att: 1,135 at York Park
- Burnie Hawks 13.12 (90) v Glenorchy 11.11 (77) – Att: 750 at West Park Oval
- Sandy Bay 20.9 (129) v Hobart 11.10 (76) – Att: 2,421 at Snug Park (Sunday)
- Devonport 18.22 (130) v Launceston 9.3 (57) – Att: 907 at Windsor Park (Sunday)
- Bye: Sth Launceston.

=== Round 15 ===
(Saturday, 23 July 1994)

- Sandy Bay 14.16 (100) v Glenorchy 6.10 (46) – Att: 1,894 at KGV Football Park
- Nth Launceston 31.12 (198) v Launceston 6.10 (46) – Att: 857 at York Park
- Devonport 19.17 (131) v Sth Launceston 9.11 (65) – Att: 1,491 at Devonport Oval
- New Norfolk 19.16 (130) v Hobart 12.7 (79) – Att: 980 at Boyer Oval
- Bye: Clarence, Burnie Hawks, Nth Hobart.

=== Round 16 ===
(Saturday, 30 July 1994)

- Hobart 9.15 (69) v Nth Launceston 9.15 (69) – Att: 550 at North Hobart Oval
- Glenorchy 9.9 (63) v Nth Hobart 6.19 (55) – Att: 1,520 at KGV Football Park
- New Norfolk 12.15 (87) v Devonport 12.10 (82) – Att: 1,009 at Boyer Oval
- Clarence 17.9 (111) v Sandy Bay 13.5 (83) – Att: 1,674 at Bellerive Oval
- Burnie Hawks 17.17 (119) v Sth Launceston 9.9 (63) – Att: 752 at West Park Oval
- Bye: Launceston.

=== Round 17 ===
(Saturday, 6 August 1994)

- Nth Hobart 22.15 (147) v Launceston 6.13 (49) – Att: 687 at North Hobart Oval
- Burnie Hawks 18.9 (117) v Clarence 14.16 (100) – Att: 1,088 at Bellerive Oval
- Nth Launceston 11.17 (83) v New Norfolk 10.14 (74) – Att: 637 at York Park
- Sth Launceston 12.13 (85) v Hobart 10.15 (75) – Att: 510 at Youngtown Memorial Ground
- Devonport 3.11 (29) v Glenorchy 3.7 (25) – Att: 1,030 at Devonport Oval
- Bye: Sandy Bay.

=== Round 18 ===
(Saturday, 13 August 1994)

- Nth Hobart 24.13 (157) v Sandy Bay 9.8 (62) – Att: 1,116 at North Hobart Oval
- Glenorchy 12.8 (80) v Hobart 7.17 (59) – Att: 1,040 at KGV Football Park
- New Norfolk 10.10 (70) v Sth Launceston 6.10 (46) – Att: 751 at Boyer Oval
- Nth Launceston 18.18 (126) v Burnie Hawks 9.11 (65) – Att: 512 at York Park
- Clarence 25.18 (168) v Launceston 9.7 (61) – Att: 512 at Windsor Park
- Bye: Devonport.

=== Round 19 ===
(Saturday, 20 August & Sunday, 21 August 1994)

- Nth Hobart 15.19 (109) v Nth Launceston 9.14 (68) – Att: 1,176 at North Hobart Oval
- Clarence 25.22 (172) v Devonport 13.9 (87) – Att: 1,293 at Bellerive Oval
- Sth Launceston 20.16 (136) v Glenorchy 14.10 (94) – Att: 662 at Youngtown Memorial Ground
- Burnie Hawks 11.15 (81) v Hobart 10.10 (70) – Att: 705 at West Park Oval
- Sandy Bay 30.12 (192) v Launceston 9.14 (68) – Att: 606 at North Hobart Oval (Sunday)
- Bye: New Norfolk.

=== Round 20 ===
(Saturday, 27 August & Sunday, 28 August 1994)

- New Norfolk 11.17 (83) v Sandy Bay 8.16 (64) – Att: 1,519 at North Hobart Oval
- Burnie Hawks 23.18 (156) v Launceston 5.9 (39) – Att: 567 at Windsor Park
- Devonport 14.8 (92) v Nth Hobart 11.11 (77) – Att: 1,579 at Devonport Oval
- Clarence 11.5 (71) v Glenorchy 9.14 (68) – Att: 1,870 at Bellerive Oval (Sunday)
- Nth Launceston 28.18 (186) v Sth Launceston 14.19 (103) – Att: 1,041 at York Park (Sunday)
- Bye: Hobart.

=== Qualifying Final ===
(Saturday, 3 September 1994)

- Sandy Bay: 4.2 (26) | 6.6 (42) | 11.9 (75) | 13.13 (91)
- New Norfolk: 5.5 (35) | 9.10 (64) | 9.11 (65) | 11.15 (81)
- Attendance: 3,103 at North Hobart Oval

=== Elimination Final ===
(Sunday, 4 September 1994)

- Devonport Blues: 2.5 (17) | 5.6 (36) | 14.6 (90) | 16.8 (104)
- Burnie Hawks: 2.1 (13) | 5.6 (36) | 7.7 (49) | 8.10 (58)
- Attendance: 4,210 at Devonport Oval

=== Second Semi Final ===
(Saturday, 10 September 1994)

- Clarence: 4.3 (27) | 6.6 (42) | 10.10 (70) | 12.13 (85)
- Sandy Bay: 1.8 (14) | 6.11 (47) | 7.14 (56) | 9.16 (70)
- Attendance: 3,460 at North Hobart Oval

=== First Semi Final ===
(Sunday, 11 September 1994)

- New Norfolk: 5.4 (34) | 10.12 (72) | 16.13 (109) | 22.18 (150)
- Devonport: 4.1 (25) | 7.4 (46) | 9.8 (62) | 15.10 (100)
- Attendance: 3,062 at North Hobart Oval

=== Preliminary Final ===
(Sunday, 18 September 1994)

- New Norfolk: 5.5 (35) | 9.16 (70) | 12.20 (92) | 15.21 (111)
- Sandy Bay: 0.1 (1) | 2.3 (15) | 6.5 (41) | 13.7 (85)
- Attendance: 3,610 at North Hobart Oval

=== Grand Final ===
(Saturday, 24 September 1994) – (ABC-TV highlights: 1994 TFL Grand Final)

- Clarence: 5.3 (33) | 6.6 (42) | 9.10 (64) | 13.13 (91)
- New Norfolk: 3.1 (19) | 5.2 (32) | 6.3 (39) | 8.5 (53)
- Attendance: 14,230 at North Hobart Oval

Source: All scores and statistics courtesy of the Hobart Mercury, Launceston Examiner and North West Advocate publications.
