= Graeme Shephard =

Australian rules footballer

Personal information
- Full name: Graeme Shephard
- Born: 8 March 1949 (age 77)
- Original team: Cooee
- Height: 175 cm (5 ft 9 in)
- Weight: 76 kg (168 lb)
- Position: Rover

Playing career^{1}
Years	Club	Games (Goals)
1970, 1974–1975	Collingwood	46 (18)
- ^{1} Playing statistics correct to the end of 1975.

Graeme Shephard (born 8 March 1949) is a former Australian rules footballer who played for Collingwood in the Victorian Football League (VFL) during the 1970s.

Shephard, a Cooee 'best and fairest' winner in 1969, had his first stint at Collingwood in 1970 but returned to Tasmania the following season. He won his second 'best and fairest' in 1973 and played in Cooee's premiership team that year. A rover who could play as a centreman, Shephard also won the Wander Medal in 1973, the North West Football Union's top individual award.

Back in Collingwood colours, he participated in VFL finals series in 1974 and 1975. He was a member of another NWFU premiership team with Cooee in 1978, after coaching the club the previous year.

A regular Tasmanian interstate representative, he represented his state at the 1972 Perth Carnival. His son Heath also played with Collingwood.

In 2008, Shephard was inducted into the Tasmanian Football Hall of Fame.
