= 1996 TFL Statewide League season =

- Teams: Burnie Dockers; Clarence Kangaroos; Devonport Blues; Glenorchy Magpies; Hobart Tigers; Launceston Raiders; New Norfolk Eagles; North Hobart Demons; North Launceston Robins; Sandy Bay Seagulls; South Launceston Bulldogs
- Premiers: Clarence
- Minor premiers: Clarence; 9th minor premiership

Attendance
- Matches played: 116
- Total attendance: 155,163 (1,338 per match)

The 1996 TFL Statewide League premiership season was an Australian rules football competition, staged across Tasmania, Australia over twenty two roster rounds and six finals series matches between 6 April and 5 October 1996.

This was the eleventh season of statewide football and the League was known as the Cascade-Boags Draught Super League under a dual commercial naming-rights sponsorship agreement with both Cascade Brewery in Hobart and Boag's Brewery in Launceston.

== Participating Clubs ==
- Burnie Dockers Football Club
- Clarence District Football Club
- Devonport Football Club
- Glenorchy District Football Club
- Hobart Football Club
- Launceston Football Club
- New Norfolk District Football Club
- North Hobart Football Club
- North Launceston Football Club
- Sandy Bay Football Club
- South Launceston Football Club

=== 1996 TFL Statewide League Club Coaches ===
- Peter German (Burnie Dockers)
- Grant Fagan (Clarence)
- Andy Goodwin (Devonport)
- Paul Hamilton (Glenorchy)
- Wayne Petterd & Gary Williamson (Hobart)
- Michael Lockman (Launceston)
- Darren Dennemann (New Norfolk)
- Ricky Hanlon (North Hobart)
- Wes Lewis (North Launceston)
- Lance Spaulding (Sandy Bay)
- Peter Curran (South Launceston)

=== TFL Statewide League Reserves Grand Final ===
- Burnie Dockers 12.9 (81) v Clarence 9.20 (74) – North Hobart Oval

=== TFL Statewide League Colts (Under-19's) Grand Final ===
- Devonport 17.18 (120) v Nth Hobart 9.10 (64) – North Hobart Oval

=== Leading Goalkickers: TFL Statewide League ===
- Justin Plapp (Burnie Dockers) – 98
- Jason Gibson (Nth Launceston) – 92
- Ken Rainsford (Launceston) – 68
- Chris McGurk (Devonport) – 59

=== Medal Winners ===
- Danny Noonan (Clarence) – William Leitch Medal
- Daniel Hulm (Clarence) – Darrel Baldock Medal (Best player in TFL Grand Final)
- Brent Thomas (Launceston) – George Watt Medal (Reserves)
- Brent Dickson (Hobart) – V.A Geard Medal (Under-19's)

=== Interstate Matches ===
Interstate Match (Saturday, 1 June 1996)

- VFL 15.18 (108) v Tasmania 13.8 (86) – Att: 35,612 at Melbourne Cricket Ground (Double Header)

== 1996 TFL Statewide League Ladder ==
Pos	Team	Pld	W	L	D	PF	PA	PP	Pts
1	Clarence	20	17	3	0	2356	1434	164.3	68
2	Burnie Dockers	20	16	4	0	2263	1418	159.6	64
3	North Launceston	20	15	5	0	2156	1501	143.6	60
4	New Norfolk	20	14	6	0	1901	1671	113.8	56
5	Devonport	20	11	8	1	1908	1485	128.5	46
6	Glenorchy	20	10	10	0	1879	1497	125.5	40
7	Launceston	20	9	11	0	1726	2027	85.2	36
8	South Launceston	20	6	13	1	1573	1948	80.7	26
9	Sandy Bay	20	5	15	0	1330	2087	63.7	20
10	Hobart	20	5	15	0	1328	2095	63.4	20
11	North Hobart	20	1	19	0	1229	2486	49.4	4

=== Round 1 ===
(Saturday, 6 April & Monday, 8 April 1996)

- Sandy Bay 13.7 (85) v Sth Launceston 12.8 (80) – Att: 762 at North Hobart Oval
- Clarence 19.16 (130) v Nth Launceston 19.5 (119) – Att: 1,097 at York Park
- Devonport 15.9 (99) v Nth Hobart 4.8 (32) – Att: 1,038 at Devonport Oval
- New Norfolk 10.10 (70) v Glenorchy 9.9 (63) – Att: 1,974 at KGV Football Park (Monday)
- Burnie Dockers 25.10 (160) v Launceston 8.13 (61) – Att: 963 at Windsor Park (Monday)
- Bye: Hobart.

=== Round 2 ===
(Saturday, 13 April & Sunday, 14 April 1996)

- Clarence 20.16 (136) v Nth Hobart 8.6 (54) – Att: 1,291 at Bellerive Oval
- New Norfolk 14.15 (99) v Devonport 13.9 (87) – Att: 1,474 at Boyer Oval
- Burnie Dockers 19.12 (126) v Glenorchy 4.10 (34) – Att: 1,273 at West Park Oval
- Sandy Bay 15.18 (108) v Hobart 14.9 (93) – Att: 1,121 at TCA Ground (Sunday)
- Sth Launceston 20.10 (130) v Nth Launceston 17.7 (109) – Att: 1,286 at Youngtown Memorial Ground (Sunday)
- Bye: Launceston.

=== Round 3 ===
(Saturday, 20 April & Sunday, 21 April 1996)

- Sth Launceston 12.21 (93) v Nth Hobart 11.8 (74) – Att: 748 at North Hobart Oval
- Glenorchy 12.21 (93) v Launceston 4.13 (37) – Att: 897 at KGV Football Park
- New Norfolk 13.12 (90) v Clarence 12.16 (88) – Att: 1,897 at Bellerive Oval
- Nth Launceston 10.17 (77) v Hobart 5.13 (43) – Att: 910 at York Park
- Burnie Dockers 14.12 (96) v Devonport 10.10 (70) – Att: 3,093 at Devonport Oval (Sunday)
- Bye: Sandy Bay.

=== Round 4 ===
(Thursday, 25 April & Saturday, 27 April 1996)

- Hobart 15.11 (101) v Nth Hobart 8.15 (63) – Att: 1,204 at North Hobart Oval (Anzac Day)
- Nth Launceston 13.16 (94) v Sandy Bay 12.3 (75) – Att: 813 at North Hobart Oval
- New Norfolk 19.17 (131) v Sth Launceston 8.9 (57) – Att: 1,572 at Boyer Oval
- Launceston 14.13 (97) v Devonport 11.10 (76) – Att: 680 at York Park
- Burnie Dockers 17.10 (112) v Clarence 11.16 (82) – Att: 2,622 at West Park Oval
- Bye: Glenorchy.

=== Round 5 ===
(Saturday, 4 May 1996)

- Sandy Bay 12.14 (86) v Nth Hobart 9.12 (66) – Att: 1,005 at North Hobart Oval
- Clarence 17.19 (121) v Launceston 15.10 (100) – Att: 1,243 at Bellerive Oval
- New Norfolk 13.19 (97) v Hobart 7.13 (55) – Att: 1,420 at Boyer Oval
- Burnie Dockers 20.14 (134) v Sth Launceston 13.9 (87) – Att: 1,211 at York Park
- Glenorchy 15.9 (99) v Devonport 12.12 (84) – Att: 1,086 at Devonport Oval
- Bye: Nth Launceston.

=== Round 6 ===
(Saturday, 11 May & Sunday, 12 May 1996)

- Burnie Dockers 18.13 (121) v Hobart 13.8 (86) – Att: 828 at North Hobart Oval
- Clarence 14.12 (96) v Glenorchy 12.10 (82) – Att: 1,674 at KGV Football Park
- Nth Launceston 25.13 (163) v Nth Hobart 7.9 (51) – Att: 779 at York Park
- New Norfolk 12.8 (80) v Sandy Bay 8.14 (62) – Att: 1,148 at North Hobart Oval (Sunday)
- Launceston 15.7 (97) v Sth Launceston 9.9 (63) – Att: 861 at Windsor Park (Sunday)
- Bye: Devonport.

=== Round 7 ===
(Saturday, 18 May 1996)

- Launceston 17.12 (114) v Hobart 10.16 (76) – Att: 724 at TCA Ground
- Clarence 17.6 (108) v Devonport 8.16 (64) – Att: 1,077 at Bellerive Oval
- Nth Launceston 19.7 (121) v New Norfolk 11.8 (74) – Att: 1,411 at Boyer Oval
- Glenorchy 22.15 (147) v Sth Launceston 6.2 (38) – Att: 710 at Youngtown Memorial Ground
- Burnie Dockers 25.13 (163) v Sandy Bay 12.6 (78) – Att: 1,799 at West Park Oval
- Bye: Nth Hobart.

=== Round 8 ===
(Saturday, 25 May & Sunday, 26 May 1996)

- Sandy Bay 17.13 (115) v Launceston 13.9 (87) – Att: 955 at Queenborough Oval
- Hobart 11.17 (83) v Glenorchy 9.15 (69) – Att: 1,242 at KGV Football Park
- Nth Launceston 27.12 (174) v Burnie Dockers 8.10 (58) – Att: 2,557 at York Park
- Devonport 12.9 (81) v Sth Launceston 13.3 (81) – Att: 1,126 at Devonport Oval
- New Norfolk 23.16 (154) v Nth Hobart 8.10 (58) – Att: 1,304 at North Hobart Oval (Sunday)
- Bye: Clarence.

Note: As of 2013, the game at Devonport Oval is the most recent drawn match in the TFL or TSL.

=== Round 9 ===
(Saturday, 8 June, Sunday, 9 June & Monday, 10 June 1996)

- Devonport 14.11 (95) v Hobart 8.7 (55) – Att: 762 at North Hobart Oval
- Glenorchy 11.20 (86) v Sandy Bay 3.5 (23) – Att: 988 at KGV Football Park
- Burnie Dockers 19.21 (135) v Nth Hobart 6.6 (42) – Att: 1,372 at West Park Oval
- Clarence 15.18 (108) v Sth Launceston 16.6 (102) – Att: 693 at York Park (Sunday)
- Nth Launceston 17.10 (112) v Launceston 11.8 (74) – Att: 1,569 at York Park (Monday)
- Bye: New Norfolk.

=== Round 10 ===
(Saturday, 15 June 1996)

- Launceston 17.12 (114) v Nth Hobart 15.9 (99) – Att: 559 at North Hobart Oval
- Clarence 21.13 (139) v Hobart 7.11 (53) – Att: 1,081 at Bellerive Oval
- Burnie Dockers 17.10 (112) v New Norfolk 15.10 (100) – Att: 1,444 at Boyer Oval
- Nth Launceston 19.9 (123) v Glenorchy 9.12 (66) – Att: 1,137 at York Park
- Devonport 14.13 (97) v Sandy Bay 10.11 (71) – Att: 1,201 at Devonport Oval
- Bye: Sth Launceston.

=== Round 11 ===
(Saturday, 22 June & Sunday, 23 June 1996)

- Hobart 17.10 (112) v Sth Launceston 12.11 (83) – Att: 614 at TCA Ground
- Glenorchy 19.10 (124) v Nth Hobart 11.11 (77) – Att: 939 at KGV Football Park
- New Norfolk 21.9 (135) v Launceston 13.11 (89) – Att: 770 at Windsor Park
- Devonport 11.11 (77) v Nth Launceston 10.8 (68) – Att: 2,122 at Devonport Oval (Sunday)
- Clarence 18.19 (127) v Sandy Bay 11.8 (74) – Att: 1,058 at North Hobart Oval (Sunday)
- Bye: Burnie Dockers.

=== Round 12 ===
(Saturday, 29 June & Sunday, 30 June 1996)

- Devonport 19.17 (131) v Nth Hobart 11.10 (76) – Att: 602 at North Hobart Oval
- Nth Launceston 14.8 (92) v Clarence 11.13 (79) – Att: 1,450 at Bellerive Oval
- Sth Launceston 13.12 (90) v Sandy Bay 5.6 (36) – Att: 451 at Youngtown Memorial Ground
- Launceston 14.9 (93) v Burnie Dockers 13.13 (91) – Att: 955 at West Park Oval
- New Norfolk 13.10 (88) v Glenorchy 12.11 (83) – Att: 1,591 at Boyer Oval (Sunday)
- Bye: Hobart.

=== Round 13 ===
(Saturday, 6 July & Sunday, 7 July 1996)

- Sandy Bay 21.12 (138) v Hobart 16.9 (105) – Att: 871 at Queenborough Oval
- Glenorchy 13.18 (96) v Burnie Dockers 10.12 (72) – Att: 1,540 at KGV Football Park
- Devonport 15.17 (107) v New Norfolk 4.11 (35) – Att: 960 at Devonport Oval
- Clarence 22.10 (142) v Nth Hobart 10.12 (72) – Att: 870 at North Hobart Oval (Sunday)
- Nth Launceston 13.15 (93) v Sth Launceston 9.6 (60) – Att: 2,016 at York Park (Sunday)
- Bye: Launceston.

=== Round 14 ===
(Saturday, 13 July & Sunday, 14 July 1996)

- Nth Launceston 14.11 (95) v Hobart 8.6 (54) – Att: 663 at North Hobart Oval
- Sth Launceston 14.13 (97) v Nth Hobart 8.8 (56) – Att: 544 at Youngtown Memorial Ground
- Glenorchy 16.13 (109) v Launceston 10.10 (70) – Att: 798 at Windsor Park
- Clarence 19.19 (133) v New Norfolk 4.7 (31) – Att: 1,676 at Boyer Oval (Sunday)
- Burnie Dockers 10.13 (73) v Devonport 6.11 (47) – Att: 5,078 at West Park Oval (Sunday)
- Bye: Sandy Bay.

=== Round 15 ===
(Saturday, 20 July & Sunday, 21 July 1996)

- Clarence 12.12 (84) v Burnie Dockers 11.6 (72) – Att: 1,511 at Bellerive Oval
- Nth Launceston 18.19 (127) v Sandy Bay 12.9 (81) – Att: 726 at York Park
- New Norfolk 19.9 (123) v Sth Launceston 13.8 (86) – Att: 665 at Youngtown Memorial Ground
- Devonport 37.9 (231) v Launceston 10.6 (66) – Att: 1,591 at Devonport Oval
- Hobart 11.16 (82) v Nth Hobart 10.7 (67) – Att: 1,125 at North Hobart Oval (Sunday)
- Bye: Glenorchy.

=== Round 16 ===
(Saturday, 27 July & Sunday, 28 July 1996)

- New Norfolk 12.21 (93) v Hobart 13.6 (84) – Att: 1,694 at North Hobart Oval
- Glenorchy 15.11 (101) v Devonport 10.9 (69) – Att: 1,018 at KGV Football Park
- Clarence 13.14 (92) v Launceston 7.12 (54) – Att: 497 at York Park
- Burnie Dockers 22.22 (154) v Sth Launceston 8.5 (53) – Att: 1,448 at West Park Oval
- Nth Hobart 15.14 (104) v Sandy Bay 13.9 (87) – Att: 705 at North Hobart Oval (Sunday)
- Bye: Nth Launceston.

=== Round 17 ===
(Saturday, 3 August & Sunday, 4 August 1996)

- Nth Launceston 16.13 (109) v Nth Hobart 5.4 (34) – Att: 645 at North Hobart Oval
- New Norfolk 17.10 (112) v Sandy Bay 4.5 (29) – Att: 886 at Boyer Oval
- Burnie Dockers 14.18 (102) v Hobart 0.5 (5) – Att: 808 at West Park Oval *
- Clarence 11.6 (72) v Glenorchy 8.5 (53) – Att: 1,318 at Bellerive Oval (Sunday)
- Launceston 14.7 (91) v Sth Launceston 7.8 (50) – Att: 617 at York Park (Sunday)
- Bye: Devonport.

Note: Hobart becomes the first TFL club to record a goalless match since Clarence at KGV in 1958.

=== Round 18 ===
(Saturday, 10 August 1996)

- Burnie Dockers 18.16 (124) v Sandy Bay 4.9 (33) – Att: 590 at North Hobart Oval
- Sth Launceston 12.6 (78) v Glenorchy 10.6 (66) – Att: 764 at KGV Football Park
- Nth Launceston 20.14 (134) v New Norfolk 12.5 (77) – Att: 1,341 at York Park
- Launceston 17.15 (117) v Hobart 9.10 (64) – Att: 399 at Windsor Park *
- Clarence 19.8 (122) v Devonport 8.6 (54) – Att: 1,390 at Devonport Oval
- Bye: Nth Hobart.

Note: Official attendance of 399 is the lowest recorded attendance in the history of Statewide League football.

=== Round 19 ===
(Saturday, 17 August & Sunday, 18 August 1996)

- Hobart 10.18 (78) v Glenorchy 9.10 (64) – Att: 1,173 at North Hobart Oval
- New Norfolk 14.17 (101) v Nth Hobart 1.3 (9) – Att: 841 at Boyer Oval
- Launceston 9.10 (64) v Sandy Bay 3.8 (26) – Att: 402 at Windsor Park
- Devonport 14.7 (91) v Sth Launceston 7.7 (49) – Att: 678 at Youngtown Memorial Ground (Sunday)
- Burnie Dockers 10.13 (73) v Nth Launceston 6.4 (40) – Att: 2,531 at West Park Oval (Sunday)
- Bye: Clarence.

=== Round 20 ===
(Saturday, 24 August & Sunday, 25 August 1996)

- Burnie Dockers 24.20 (164) v Nth Hobart 10.9 (69) – Att: 548 at North Hobart Oval
- Clarence 20.16 (136) v Sth Launceston 12.12 (84) – Att: 1,001 at Bellerive Oval
- Nth Launceston 19.22 (136) v Launceston 8.5 (53) – Att: 1,088 at York Park
- Devonport 16.16 (112) v Hobart 6.5 (41) – Att: 1,082 at Devonport Oval
- Glenorchy 19.18 (132) v Sandy Bay 4.10 (34) – Att: 782 at North Hobart Oval (Sunday)
- Bye: New Norfolk.

=== Round 21 ===
(Saturday, 31 August & Sunday, 1 September 1996)

- Devonport 19.9 (123) v Sandy Bay 7.9 (51) – Att: 992 at North Hobart Oval
- Nth Launceston 15.15 (105) v Glenorchy 14.15 (99) – Att: 1,012 at KGV Football Park
- Launceston 24.11 (155) v Nth Hobart 7.10 (52) – Att: 486 at Windsor Park
- Burnie Dockers 17.19 (121) v New Norfolk 12.12 (84) – Att: 1,924 at West Park Oval
- Clarence 35.17 (227) v Hobart 5.4 (34) – Att: 804 at North Hobart Oval (Sunday) *
- Bye: Sth Launceston.

Note: This match was Hobart's 1000th TANFL/TFL match (the club's 1,016th senior match overall).

=== Round 22 ===
(Saturday, 7 September & Sunday, 8 September 1996)

- Glenorchy 33.15 (213) v Nth Hobart 11.8 (74) – Att: 837 at North Hobart Oval
- Clarence 19.19 (133) v Sandy Bay 5.8 (38) – Att: 2,243 at Bellerive Oval
- New Norfolk 19.12 (126) v Launceston 14.9 (93) – Att: 867 at Boyer Oval
- Sth Launceston 16.16 (112) v Hobart 2.12 (24) – Att: 490 at York Park
- Nth Launceston 17.11 (113) v Devonport 9.11 (65) – Att: 1,509 at York Park (Sunday)
- Bye: Burnie Dockers.

=== Elimination Final ===
(Sunday, 15 September 1996)

- Devonport: 4.1 (25) | 9.3 (57) | 16.4 (100) | 20.5 (125)
- New Norfolk: 3.2 (20) | 9.5 (59) | 11.9 (75) | 13.10 (88)
- Attendance: 2,045 at North Hobart Oval

=== Qualifying Final ===
(Sunday, 15 September 1996)

- Nth Launceston: 6.1 (37) | 7.1 (43) | 10.10 (70) | 11.12 (78)
- Burnie Dockers: 3.2 (20) | 4.5 (29) | 6.5 (41) | 9.11 (65)
- Attendance: 3,006 at West Park Oval

=== Second Semi Final ===
(Saturday, 21 September 1996)

- Clarence Roos: 5.2 (32) | 9.7 (61) | 11.11 (77) | 18.15 (123)
- Nth Launceston: 1.5 (11) | 3.8 (26) | 8.13 (61) | 10.14 (74)
- Attendance: 2,100 at North Hobart Oval

=== First Semi Final ===
(Sunday, 22 September 1996)

- Burnie Dockers: 8.2 (50) | 11.6 (72) | 15.9 (99) | 18.9 (117)
- Devonport Blues: 3.5 (23) | 9.6 (60) | 12.8 (80) | 13.9 (87)
- Attendance: 5,322 at West Park Oval

=== Preliminary Final ===
(Sunday, 29 September 1996)

- Burnie Dockers: 3.3 (21) | 5.5 (35) | 11.7 (73) | 14.9 (93)
- Nth Launceston: 2.5 (17) | 4.7 (31) | 5.9 (39) | 10.12 (72)
- Attendance: 2,061 at York Park

=== Grand Final ===
(Saturday, 5 October 1996) (ABC-TV highlights: 1996 TFL Grand Final)

- Clarence Roos: 3.4 (22) | 7.10 (52) | 12.14 (86) | 14.17 (101)
- Burnie Dockers: 2.3 (15) | 4.5 (29) | 7.9 (51) | 10.14 (74)
- Attendance: 12,352 at North Hobart Oval

Source: All scores and statistics courtesy of the Hobart Mercury, Launceston Examiner and North West Advocate publications.
