= 1993 TFL Statewide League season =

- Teams: Burnie Hawks; Clarence Kangaroos; Devonport Blues; Glenorchy Magpies; Hobart Tigers; New Norfolk Eagles; North Hobart Demons; North Launceston Robins; Sandy Bay Seagulls; South Launceston Bulldogs
- Premiers: Clarence
- Minor premiers: Clarence; 7th minor premiership

Attendance
- Matches played: 96
- Total attendance: 141,051 (1,469 per match)

The 1993 TFL Statewide League premiership season was an Australian rules football competition staged across Tasmania, Australia over eighteen roster rounds and six finals series matches between 4 April and 18 September 1993.

This was the eighth season of statewide football competition and The League was known as the Cascade-Boags Draught Super-League under a dual commercial naming-rights sponsorship agreement with both Cascade Brewery in Hobart and Boag's Brewery in Launceston.

The finals series was also sponsored by Telecom Mobilenet and known as the Telecom Mobilenet Finals Series.

== Participating Clubs ==
- Burnie Hawks Football Club
- Clarence District Football Club
- Devonport Blues Football Club
- Glenorchy District Football Club
- Hobart Football Club
- New Norfolk District Football Club
- North Hobart Football Club
- North Launceston Football Club
- Sandy Bay Football Club
- South Launceston Football Club

=== 1993 TFL Statewide League Club Coaches ===
- Michael Schulze (Burnie Hawks)
- Stevie Wright (Clarence)
- Peter Knights (Devonport)
- Kim Excell (Glenorchy)
- Greg Lane & Wayne Petterd (Hobart)
- Darren Denneman (New Norfolk)
- Andy Bennett (North Hobart)
- David Rhys-Jones (North Launceston)
- Chris Fagan (Sandy Bay)
- Bob Keddie & Craig Coombes (South Launceston)

=== St Luke's Cup (Reserves) Grand Final ===
- Glenorchy 16.11 (107) v Clarence 10.20 (80)

=== Statewide League Colts (Under-19's) Grand Final ===
- Nth Hobart 16.9 (105) v Clarence 7.15 (57)

=== Leading Goalkickers: TFL Statewide League ===
- Keith Robinson (Hobart) – 76
- Paul Dac (New Norfolk) – 66
- Byron Howard Jr (Nth Hobart) – 62
- Michael McGregor (Sandy Bay) – 61

=== Medal Winners ===
- Darryn Perry (Nth Hobart) & Rene Peters (New Norfolk) – William Leitch Medal
- Darren Winter (Clarence) – Darrel Baldock Medal (Best player in TFL Grand Final)
- Ricky Darley (Nth Hobart) – George Watt Medal (Reserves)
- Craig Carr (Glenorchy) – V.A Geard Medal (Under-19's)
- Ricky Braslin (New Norfolk) – D.R Plaister Medal (Under-17's)

=== Intrastate Matches ===
Area of Origin Match (Saturday, 8 May 1993)

- North 15.14 (104) v South 16.8 (104) – Att: 1,790 at Devonport Oval

=== Interstate Matches ===
Interstate Match (Sunday, 6 June 1993)

- TFL 11.8 (74) v Queensland 9.10 (64) – Att: 9,660 at Bellerive Oval (State of Origin Curtain Raiser)

State of Origin Match (Sunday, 6 June 1993)

- Queensland/Northern Territory 16.14 (110) v Tasmania 10.16 (76) – Att: 9,660 at Bellerive Oval

== Season summary ==
The 1993 TFL Statewide League season began on Sunday, 4 April with North Launceston recording a strong first-up victory over Devonport at York Park, the Robins along with Clarence – for many years seen as finals pretenders – were touted as the sides to watch with their respective leaders, former Carlton and South Melbourne VFL/AFL hard-man David Rhys-Jones (North Launceston) and former Sydney Swan Stevie Wright (Clarence) looking to put their stamp on the competition.

North Hobart, the reigning premiers from 1991 & 1992 had lost several players from their premiership teams and gained former Sandy Bay skipper Andy Bennett as coach, many in the football fraternity questioning whether the Demons would be able to cover their losses adequately while still struggling financially but the Demons were able to still produce excellent results to finish the roster season in second position, defying the critics.

Hobart would find 1993 as the year they began to crumble, after enduring prolonged success from 1986 to 1992, the Tigers lost captain-coach Mark Browning the previous October and the club had organised former Melbourne Demon Simon Eishold to replace him as coach, but owing to the club not being able to find Eishold or his wife suitable employment in Hobart (Tasmania's unemployment rate had hit 12.8% at this time), he resigned before the season started leading to a chain of events for the Tigers which was somewhat chaotic, finally the Tigers signed former St Kilda player Greg Lane as coach, but Lane himself, unable to commit to a full-time coaching role with his busy workload resigned after just five rounds of the season and was replaced by club stalwart Wayne Petterd.

After winning only two games in the first twelve rounds the turning point for the Tigers came against Clarence on 17 July, after trailing the Roos at half-time in a game in which Clarence had been heavily favoured in the free-kick count, Hobart's supporters exploded and field umpire Gene Phair was eventually assaulted in the race by an angry mob of Tiger fans.

A week later on 24 July was an even more remarkable display, with North Launceston trouncing the Tigers by 72-points in the second quarter at North Hobart Oval, Hobart went on a scoring spree from that point to reduce the Robins lead to just 1-point late in the final quarter before a goal to North Launceston seconds before the siren ended potentially the greatest comeback in TFL history.

The following weeks saw the Tigers form return and they would go on to shape the final five by winning four of their final five matches, including a last kick of the day loss to North Hobart on 14 August.

Glenorchy would shake off the disappointment of the previous three seasons and their near financial collapse to start the season in a blaze of glory by winning their opening six matches, their run stopped the week after one of the most controversial finishes to a match in Tasmanian football history on 22 May.

The Magpies, leading the Burnie Hawks by 17-points late into the last quarter in a fiery match at KGV in which there were seventeen reports, were awarded the game after the match was abandoned by central umpire Gary Dawson when Burnie Hawks' rugged defender Dale Whish-Wilson, earlier sent off the field for throwing a football at boundary umpire Peter Walker's head, ran back onto the field after Hawks player Leigh Heath sustained a corked thigh.

With no available players left on the bench to replace Heath, Whish-Wilson claimed he had asked the emergency umpire if he was allowed back onto the field and that the emergency umpire had just "shrugged his shoulders" at him, and therefore re-entered the playing field to take up his position when spotted by Dawson, he was ordered three times from the field by umpire Dawson and on television replays replies "No way! at the umpire in charge.

After refusing to leave the ground, the field umpires then abandoned the match and left the field in a scene of pandemonium as brawls broke out in the stands and eventually spilled out onto the streets outside the ground between rival supporters.

After a week of meetings, the TFL decided that the match would be declared as a forfeit by the Burnie Hawks with 4:53 remaining in the match, with the match scores at the time of the abandonment standing.

For his part, Whish-Wilson claimed he had been victimised by the field umpires all afternoon because of his reputation but was still handed a ten-match suspension.

For Glenorchy, they would struggle from that point and win just four more games for the season to limp into the five by virtue of a final round victory over Sandy Bay at Queenborough while the Hawks would continue on in fine style under former Geelong player Michael Shulze and cement a top-four position.

New Norfolk would start the season with great optimism, but after an opening day defeat to Sandy Bay at Boyer, Darren Denneman's Eagles would struggle to maintain any sort of consistency throughout the season and eventually needed to defeat an in-form Hobart at Boyer in the final round to make the finals, Hobart proved too good all day for a disappointing New Norfolk and Glenorchy, on the back of four losses in a row were able to defeat Sandy Bay at Queenborough to leapfrog them into the finals.

The southern matches played on 12 June (Round 8) featured heavy snowfalls while the matches were in progress, with the matches at North Hobart, Queenborough and Boyer all affected.

At the other end of the table, Sandy Bay started the season well with a young squad under Chris Fagan, only a year after the Seagulls required a major "Save The Bay" fundraising drive to raise enough funds for it to even stay in the TFL, the Bay finished the season on a disappointing note by winning only one of its final ten matches as more calls came out for the struggling club to merge (this time with Hobart) and to move away from the outdated Queenborough Oval and relocate to North Hobart Oval.

South Launceston would continue to struggle, the TFL was so concerned with the health of football in Launceston that a forum gathered in June to discuss ways to improve the health of the sport in the North, the Bulldogs had always under-performed and were continuing to do so and had very little support, North Launceston, despite good on-field results were struggling for crowds and the general interest in the sport in the region was seen to be falling quite significantly which was bad news for a financially stricken TFL that was now servicing a debt of more than A$300,000.

The TFL and General Manager Barry Breen were now looking at increasing teams for the 1994 season with the possibility of both Launceston and Ulverstone being called up to join the Statewide League.

The finals series began on 28 August with North Hobart and North Launceston doing battle at North Hobart Oval, the Robins finally ending their hoodoo against the Demons with a fantastic 18-point win in a classic confrontation.

The following day the Elimination Final featured Burnie Hawks and Glenorchy, again at North Hobart Oval, the choice of venue was not a popular one with the Coastal club who had finished two games clear and a significantly higher percentage above Glenorchy.

The two clubs who had fought out a controversial match earlier in the season would face off in a thrilling finish to the match, the Hawks had been too good for the first three quarters and still held a 27-point lead at the final change.

In the final quarter Glenorchy found form and played their best football for several months and produced an amazing ten goal final quarter to overrun a disappointed Burnie Hawks' team by 13-points.

The Second Semi Final would prove to be a dress rehearsal for the Grand Final, with Clarence and North Launceston locking horns in a hard-fought match at North Hobart.

The Robins and Roos had been in a see-sawing encounter, with Clarence scoring the decisive break in the third quarter with 4.7 to 1.4 for the quarter to eke out a slender two-goal lead at the final change. Despite inaccuracy in the final quarter, Clarence would run away to win the match by 24 points to make their first Grand Final since 1985.

Glenorchy and North Hobart would battle it out in the First Semi Final on 5 September at North Hobart Oval.

North Hobart, after a slow start and trailing Glenorchy by a point at half-time, went on a ten-goal third quarter rampage as a powerless Magpie outfit could do nothing to stop an ominous-looking Demon team from racing away to an impressive 73-point win.

In the Preliminary Final on 5 September, the two old rivals North Hobart and North Launceston would meet at a cold and showery North Hobart Oval.

The Demons were aiming to become the first club to win a hat-trick of premierships since Sandy Bay in 1976, 1977 and 1978, while the Robins were hellbent on denying their much-hated rival any attempt at glory, more so on their home ground.

After leading for the first three quarters North Hobart appeared to be headed to another Grand Final and keeping the dream of the treble alive.

In the final quarter North Launceston produced an amazing comeback, with steady rain falling, the majority of the 3,306 strong crowd against them and kicking to the Domain (scoreboard) end, the Robins produced a withering six goal to one burst to snuff out the Demons' fire and march into their third Grand Final in four years by 13-points, the visiting Robins fans celebratingly wildly in the Demons own end of the ground which led to some confrontations amongst supporters.

For the Demons, this was to mark the end of their glorious reign in the Statewide League which realised four premiership titles in seven years, in a few years North Hobart would sink to the lower reaches of the ladder and struggle to survive under crushing financial problems.

The Grand Final on 18 September would see two good friends, North Launceston's David Rhys-Jones and Clarence's Stevie Wright lead their prospective sides into battle at North Hobart Oval for premiership glory.

In what was recognised as one of the finest Grand Finals in the history of Statewide football, the Robins had gotten out to a solid lead in the second quarter before Clarence chipped away at their lead to reduce it to 15-points at half-time.

In the third quarter it was again North Launceston looking particularly dangerous, at the midway stage of the quarter Clarence went on a withering run producing seven goals to eventually hit the front nearing three-quarter time against a shell-shocked North Launceston.

In an even final quarter Clarence had eventually sneaked out to a match-winning lead before the Robins had one final tilt at the premiership, reducing the lead to only 9-points late in the game, the Robins once again were steaming forward as the siren sounded to give an ecstatic Clarence the flag for the first time since 1984.

== 1993 TFL Statewide League Ladder ==
| Pos | Team | Pld | W | L | D | PF | PA | PP | Pts |
|---|---|---|---|---|---|---|---|---|---|
| 1 | Clarence | 18 | 16 | 2 | 0 | 2151 | 1353 | 159.0 | 64 |
| 2 | North Hobart | 18 | 13 | 5 | 0 | 1881 | 1368 | 137.5 | 52 |
| 3 | North Launceston | 18 | 12 | 6 | 0 | 1989 | 1619 | 122.9 | 48 |
| 4 | Burnie Hawks | 18 | 12 | 6 | 0 | 1993 | 1701 | 117.2 | 48 |
| 5 | Glenorchy | 18 | 10 | 8 | 0 | 1686 | 1778 | 94.8 | 40 |
| 6 | New Norfolk | 18 | 9 | 9 | 0 | 1873 | 1854 | 101.0 | 36 |
| 7 | Hobart | 18 | 6 | 12 | 0 | 1764 | 1951 | 90.4 | 24 |
| 8 | Sandy Bay | 18 | 5 | 13 | 0 | 1725 | 2017 | 85.5 | 20 |
| 9 | South Launceston | 18 | 4 | 14 | 0 | 1379 | 2283 | 60.4 | 16 |
| 10 | Devonport | 18 | 3 | 15 | 0 | 1410 | 1927 | 73.2 | 12 |

=== Round 1 ===
(Sunday, 4 April, Saturday, 10 April & Monday, 12 April 1993)

- Nth Launceston 19.20 (134) v Devonport 13.5 (83) – Att: 1,779 at York Park (Sunday)
- Clarence 16.11 (107) v Nth Hobart 10.13 (73) – Att: 1,863 at Bellerive Oval (Saturday)
- Sandy Bay 23.15 (153) v New Norfolk 17.14 (116) – Att: 1,617 at Boyer Oval (Saturday)
- Glenorchy 18.18 (126) v Hobart 17.10 (112) – Att: 1,884 at North Hobart Oval (Monday)
- Burnie Hawks 24.10 (154) v Sth Launceston 20.11 (131) – Att: 1,182 at West Park Oval (Monday)

=== Round 2 ===
(Saturday, 17 April 1993)

- Nth Hobart 14.19 (103) v New Norfolk 11.13 (79) – Att: 1,621 at North Hobart Oval
- Burnie Hawks 20.19 (139) v Sandy Bay 17.11 (113) – Att: 782 at Queenborough Oval
- Glenorchy 10.13 (73) v Clarence 7.10 (52) – Att: 2,108 at KGV Football Park
- Nth Launceston 21.23 (149) v Sth Launceston 9.5 (59) – Att: 1,427 at Youngtown Memorial Ground
- Devonport 11.19 (85) v Hobart 10.14 (74) – Att: 1,012 at Devonport Oval

=== Round 3 ===
(Saturday, 24 April 1993)

- Hobart 18.13 (121) v Sth Launceston 14.18 (102) – Att: 864 at North Hobart Oval
- Sandy Bay 17.12 (114) v Devonport 10.16 (76) – Att: 808 at Queenborough Oval
- Glenorchy 17.14 (116) v New Norfolk 11.14 (80) – Att: 1,830 at Boyer Oval
- Nth Launceston 16.12 (108) v Nth Hobart 14.14 (98) – Att: 1,471 at York Park
- Clarence 17.14 (116) v Burnie Hawks 14.7 (91) – Att: 1,072 at West Park Oval

=== Round 4 ===
(Saturday, 1 May 1993)

- Burnie Hawks 16.7 (103) v Nth Hobart 12.12 (84) – Att: 1,248 at North Hobart Oval
- Nth Launceston 22.13 (145) v Sandy Bay 17.10 (112) – Att: 1,267 at Queenborough Oval
- Clarence 21.6 (132) v Hobart 10.14 (74) – Att: 1,634 at Bellerive Oval
- New Norfolk 20.13 (133) v Sth Launceston 14.17 (101) – Att: 674 at Youngtown Memorial Ground
- Glenorchy 14.7 (91) v Devonport 9.12 (66) – Att: 1,246 at Devonport Oval

=== Round 5 ===
(Saturday, 15 May 1993)

- Nth Hobart 17.19 (121) v Sandy Bay 10.10 (70) – Att: 1,626 at North Hobart Oval
- Glenorchy 27.11 (173) v Sth Launceston 11.16 (82) – Att: 1,276 at KGV Football Park
- Clarence 13.20 (98) v New Norfolk 12.10 (82) – Att: 1,269 at Boyer Oval
- Nth Launceston 19.13 (127) v Hobart 15.11 (101) – Att: 1,060 at York Park
- Burnie Hawks 14.22 (106) v Devonport 8.7 (55) – Att: 1,663 at West Park Oval (Night) *

Note: This was the first night match played in TFL history.

=== Round 6 ===
(Saturday, 22 May 1993)

- Sandy Bay 22.18 (150) v Hobart 11.13 (79) – Att: 1,192 at North Hobart Oval
- Glenorchy 16.16 (112) v Burnie Hawks 14.11 (95) – Att: 1,411 at KGV Football Park ^{1}
- Clarence 28.20 (188) v Sth Launceston 10.14 (74) – Att: 1,168 at Bellerive Oval
- Nth Launceston 25.13 (163) v New Norfolk 16.8 (104) – Att: 750 at York Park
- Nth Hobart 17.11 (113) v Devonport 11.9 (75) – Att: 1,019 at Devonport Oval

^{1} This match was abandoned with 4:53 remaining in the final quarter after Dale Whish-Wilson (Burnie Hawks) returned to the field after being sent off in the third quarter and verbally abused and threatened the umpires. The TFL ruled that the match was forfeited by the Burnie Hawks with scores being final, and Whish-Wilson was suspended for 10 matches for his conduct.

=== Round 7 ===
(Saturday, 29 May & Sunday, 30 May 1993)

- Clarence 23.17 (155) v Nth Launceston 8.15 (63) – Att: 1,670 at Bellerive Oval
- New Norfolk 15.12 (102) v Devonport 12.13 (85) – Att: 1,045 at Boyer Oval
- Sandy Bay 25.21 (171) v Sth Launceston 14.19 (103) – Att: 589 at Youngtown Memorial Ground
- Burnie Hawks 24.14 (158) v Hobart 19.16 (130) – Att: 930 at West Park Oval
- Nth Hobart 21.22 (148) v Glenorchy 9.11 (65) – Att: 3,007 at North Hobart Oval (Sunday)

=== Round 8 ===
(Saturday, 12 June 1993)

- Nth Hobart 12.16 (88) v Hobart 6.6 (42) – Att: 1,118 at North Hobart Oval
- Clarence 14.12 (96) v Sandy Bay 13.7 (85) – Att: 803 at Queenborough Oval
- New Norfolk 25.15 (165) v Burnie Hawks 14.12 (96) – Att: 783 at Boyer Oval
- Nth Launceston 21.13 (139) v Glenorchy 8.7 (55) – Att: 1,459 at York Park
- Devonport 20.20 (140) v Sth Launceston 5.7 (37) – Att: 836 at Devonport Oval

=== Round 9 ===
(Saturday, 19 June 1993)

- Hobart 15.16 (106) v New Norfolk 10.14 (74) – Att: 1,139 at North Hobart Oval
- Glenorchy 13.12 (90) v Sandy Bay 10.12 (72) – Att: 1,486 at KGV Football Park
- Clarence 17.21 (123) v Devonport 13.8 (86) – Att: 928 at Bellerive Oval
- Nth Hobart 12.26 (98) v Sth Launceston 2.8 (20) – Att: 528 at Youngtown Memorial Ground
- Burnie Hawks 7.12 (54) v Nth Launceston 2.13 (25) – Att: 876 at West Park Oval

=== Round 10 ===
(Saturday, 26 June & Sunday, 27 June 1993)

- Nth Hobart 19.17 (131) v Clarence 11.9 (75) – Att: 2,082 at North Hobart Oval
- New Norfolk 20.10 (130) v Sandy Bay 10.13 (73) – Att: 900 at Queenborough Oval
- Glenorchy 14.20 (104) v Hobart 9.10 (64) – Att: 1,357 at KGV Football Park
- Burnie Hawks 28.18 (186) v Sth Launceston 8.10 (58) – Att: 541 at Youngtown Memorial Ground
- Nth Launceston 23.18 (156) v Devonport 4.12 (36) – Att: 1,415 at Devonport Oval (Sunday)

=== Round 11 ===
(Saturday, 3 July 1993)

- Hobart 16.9 (105) v Devonport 13.15 (93) – Att: 665 at North Hobart Oval
- Clarence 16.14 (110) v Glenorchy 12.13 (85) – Att: 1,795 at Bellerive Oval
- New Norfolk 15.9 (99) v Nth Hobart 9.12 (66) – Att: 1,303 at Boyer Oval
- Sth Launceston 7.10 (52) v Nth Launceston 6.6 (42) – Att: 1,004 at York Park
- Burnie Hawks 10.22 (82) v Sandy Bay 3.9 (27) – Att: 658 at West Park Oval

=== Round 12 ===
(Saturday, 10 July 1993)

- Nth Hobart 17.7 (109) v Nth Launceston 13.11 (89) – Att: 1,580 at North Hobart Oval
- New Norfolk 18.17 (125) v Glenorchy 6.11 (47) – Att: 1,850 at KGV Football Park
- Clarence 20.12 (132) v Burnie Hawks 9.19 (73) – Att: 1,205 at Bellerive Oval
- Sth Launceston 16.9 (105) v Hobart 15.13 (103) – Att: 651 at Youngtown Memorial Ground
- Sandy Bay 13.10 (88) v Devonport 11.15 (81) – Att: 809 at Devonport Oval

=== Round 13 ===
(Saturday, 17 July 1993)

- Clarence 20.12 (132) v Hobart 13.15 (93) – Att: 1,333 at North Hobart Oval
- Glenorchy 15.13 (103) v Devonport 14.12 (96) – Att: 1,050 at KGV Football Park
- New Norfolk 19.11 (125) v Sth Launceston 15.8 (98) – Att: 1,271 at Boyer Oval
- Nth Launceston 20.15 (135) v Sandy Bay 15.12 (102) – Att: 1,089 at York Park
- Burnie Hawks 15.11 (101) v Nth Hobart 7.14 (56) – Att: 979 at West Park Oval

=== Round 14 ===
(Saturday, 24 July & Sunday, 25 July 1993)

- Nth Launceston 20.11 (131) v Hobart 18.16 (124) – Att: 857 at North Hobart Oval
- Nth Hobart 16.16 (112) v Sandy Bay 12.7 (79) – Att: 1,199 at Queenborough Oval
- Clarence 27.19 (181) v New Norfolk 7.9 (51) – Att: 1,734 at Bellerive Oval
- Sth Launceston 14.12 (96) v Glenorchy 12.10 (82) – Att: 692 at Youngtown Memorial Ground
- Burnie Hawks 17.18 (120) v Devonport 8.18 (66) – Att: 1,274 at Devonport Oval (Sunday)

=== Round 15 ===
(Saturday, 31 July 1993)

- Nth Hobart 22.17 (149) v Devonport 10.13 (73) – Att: 1,068 at North Hobart Oval
- Hobart 21.18 (144) v Sandy Bay 12.19 (91) – Att: 1,064 at Queenborough Oval
- New Norfolk 19.13 (127) v Nth Launceston 12.14 (86) – Att: 1,072 at Boyer Oval
- Clarence 16.17 (113) v Sth Launceston 6.15 (51) – Att: 595 at Youngtown Memorial Ground
- Burnie Hawks 19.16 (130) v Glenorchy 16.10 (106) – Att: 1,172 at West Park Oval

=== Round 16 ===
(Saturday, 7 August 1993)

- Hobart 16.13 (109) v Burnie Hawks 13.18 (96) – Att: 720 at North Hobart Oval
- Sth Launceston 10.22 (82) v Sandy Bay 10.16 (76) – Att: 659 at Queenborough Oval
- Nth Hobart 15.10 (100) v Glenorchy 7.10 (52) – Att: 1,816 at KGV Football Park
- Clarence 13.6 (84) v Nth Launceston 9.15 (69) – Att: 1,341 at York Park
- New Norfolk 16.14 (110) v Devonport 13.7 (85) – Att: 711 at Devonport Oval

=== Round 17 ===
(Saturday, 14 August 1993)

- Nth Hobart 11.13 (79) v Hobart 11.10 (76) – Att: 1,568 at North Hobart Oval
- Nth Launceston 18.12 (120) v Glenorchy 11.18 (84) – Att: 1,107 at KGV Football Park
- Clarence 25.14 (164) v Sandy Bay 8.10 (58) – Att: 1,349 at Bellerive Oval
- Devonport 12.16 (88) v Sth Launceston 10.16 (76) – Att: 707 at Youngtown Memorial Ground
- Burnie Hawks 19.15 (129) v New Norfolk 13.12 (90) – Att: 1,444 at West Park Oval

=== Round 18 ===
(Saturday, 21 August 1993)

- Nth Hobart 22.21 (153) v Sth Launceston 7.10 (52) – Att: 1,184 at North Hobart Oval
- Glenorchy 18.14 (122) v Sandy Bay 14.7 (91) – Att: 1,153 at Queenborough Oval
- Hobart 16.11 (107) v New Norfolk 11.15 (81) – Att: 1,444 at Boyer Oval
- Nth Launceston 14.24 (108) v Burnie Hawks 11.14 (80) – Att: 3,265 at York Park
- Clarence 17.12 (114) v Devonport 5.11 (41) – Att: 740 at Devonport Oval

=== Qualifying Final ===
(Saturday, 28 August 1993)

- Nth Launceston: 2.5 (17) | 9.10 (64) | 13.13 (91) | 18.19 (127)
- Nth Hobart: 3.3 (21) | 7.6 (48) | 12.12 (84) | 16.13 (109)
- Attendance: 3,266 at North Hobart Oval

=== Elimination Final ===
(Sunday, 29 August 1993)

- Glenorchy: 4.4 (28) | 8.9 (57) | 10.13 (73) | 20.15 (135)
- Burnie Hawks: 6.4 (40) | 12.5 (77) | 15.10 (100) | 18.14 (122)
- Attendance: 2,860 at North Hobart Oval

=== Second Semi Final ===
(Saturday, 4 September 1993)

- Clarence: 3.1 (19) | 6.4 (40) | 10.11 (71) | 12.20 (92)
- Nth Launceston: 2.5 (17) | 7.7 (49) | 8.11 (59) | 9.14 (68)
- Attendance: 3,501 at North Hobart Oval

=== First Semi Final ===
(Sunday, 5 September 1993)

- Nth Hobart: 5.5 (35) | 7.8 (50) | 17.12 (114) | 23.21 (159)
- Glenorchy: 5.2 (32) | 8.3 (51) | 10.5 (65) | 13.8 (86)
- Attendance: 4,526 at North Hobart Oval

=== Preliminary Final ===
(Saturday, 11 September 1993)

- Nth Launceston 0.2 (2) | 4.4 (28) | 5.6 (36) | 11.9 (75)
- Nth Hobart: 3.2 (20) | 5.4 (34) | 8.6 (54) | 9.8 (62)
- Attendance: 3,306 at North Hobart Oval

=== Grand Final ===
(Saturday, 18 September 1993) – (ABC-TV highlights: 1993 TFL Grand Final)

- Clarence: 2.3 (15) | 9.4 (58) | 16.6 (102) | 19.12 (126)
- Nth Launceston: 5.4 (34) | 11.7 (73) | 14.12 (96) | 17.15 (117)
- Attendance: 13,102 at North Hobart Oval
