= 2004 WAFL season =

Australian rules football season

- Teams: 9
- Premiers: Subiaco; 8th premiership
- Minor premiers: Subiaco; 9th minor premiership
- Sandover Medallist: Allistair Pickett (Subiaco)
- Bernie Naylor Medallist: Brad Smith (Subiaco)
- Matches played: 94

The 2004 WAFL season was the 120th season of the various incarnations of the West Australian Football League.

Subiaco, after eleven unsuccessful finals campaigns including six in succession, won its first premiership since Haydn Bunton, Jr. took them to the 1988 flag, whilst Swan Districts, largely clear of their severe financial troubles from the 1990s, played finals for the first time in a decade. During late May and June, perennial tailender Perth looked like playing finals for only the fourth time since 1979, but faltered badly in July and August.

The wooden spoon went to East Fremantle for the first time since their debut season of 1898, with three wins being the Sharks' worst record since that debut year when they won one match of sixteen (though they also lost seventeen matches in 1968 and 1970). The blue and whites suffered from two narrow losses and a botched resignation by coach Rod Lester-Smith which was unannounced but definite before East Fremantle's Round 13 game against Subiaco. 2003 premiers West Perth, suffering a crippling injury toll, fell to seventh, which remains their lowest position since the great revival under Jeff Gieschen in 1993.

The most notable occurrence during the season was Peel Thunder being recognised with a scoreless match for the first time in any major Australian Rules league since Subiaco failed to score against South Fremantle in August 1906, due to having their score of 10.10 wiped when former Fitzroy and Subiaco rover Peter Bird was ruled to have not been cleared for that opening match. Despite this setback and losing their first eight matches, the Thunder managed to avoid the wooden spoon with five wins being their third-best record in eight seasons and still their equal fifth-best in the WAFL as of 2014. Peel also won the Colts premiership with a major upset against South Fremantle in the Grand Final.

The season was also notable for the Lions moving their home games to the redeveloped Leederville Oval and for the first night games at that ground, both of which were viewed as resounding successes at a time when the WAFL was struggling with its reduced profile.

== Home-and-away season ==
=== Round 1 ===
	Round 1
Friday, 19 March (6:45 pm)	South Fremantle 10.8 (68)	def. by	West Perth 16.8 (104)	Fremantle Oval (crowd: 2800)
Saturday, 20 March (2:15 pm)	Perth 17.12 (114)	def.	East Fremantle 10.7 (67)	Lathlain Park (crowd: 2092)
Saturday, 20 March (2:15 pm)	Peel Thunder 0.0 (0)	def. by	Claremont 17.15 (117)	Rushton Park (crowd: 1233)
Saturday, 20 March (6:45 pm)	East Perth 12.7 (79)	def. by	Subiaco 16.8 (104)	Leederville Oval (crowd: 3470)
	Bye; Swan Districts
Peel's score is officially the lowest in the WAFL since 1906, when Subiaco failed to score against South Fremantle.; The Thunder actually scored 10.10 (70), but had their score annulled at the WAFL meeting on 13 April because Peter Bird's clearance from South Bunbury did not apply to this opening game.; The first night match at Leederville, between the second- and third-placed clubs of 2003, is viewed a resounding success.

=== Round 2 ===
	Round 2
Saturday, 27 March (2:15 pm)	East Perth 15.13 (103)	def.	Peel Thunder 13.9 (87)	Leederville Oval (crowd: 1320)
Saturday, 27 March (2:15 pm)	Swan Districts 10.19 (79)	def.	South Fremantle 8.13 (61)	Bassendean Oval (crowd: 1593)
Sunday, 28 March (2:15 pm)	Claremont 14.8 (92)	def.	Perth 12.7 (79)	Claremont Oval (crowd: 1741)
Sunday, 28 March (2:15 pm)	West Perth 9.12 (66)	def. by	Subiaco 12.10 (82)	Arena Joondalup (crowd: 2000)
	Bye; East Fremantle

=== Round 3 ===
	Round 3
Friday, 2 April (6:45 pm)	Subiaco 19.4 (118)	def.	Swan Districts 11.7 (73)	Leederville Oval (crowd: 2153)
Saturday, 3 April (2:15 pm)	East Fremantle 14.6 (90)	def. by	Claremont 22.18 (150)	East Fremantle Oval (crowd: 1290)
Saturday, 3 April (2:15 pm)	Perth 10.14 (74)	def. by	East Perth 13.11 (89)	Lathlain Park (crowd: 1765)
Saturday, 3 April (2:15 pm)	Peel Thunder 10.12 (72)	def. by	West Perth 13.20 (98)	Rushton Park (crowd: 1619)
	Bye; South Fremantle

=== Round 4 ===
	Round 4
Saturday, 10 April (2:15 pm)	West Perth 14.20 (104)	def.	Perth 9.9 (63)	Arena Joondalup (crowd: 1987)
Saturday, 10 April (2:15 pm)	Swan Districts 20.10 (130)	def.	Peel Thunder 13.5 (83)	Bassendean Oval (crowd: 1871)
Monday, 12 April (2:15 pm)	South Fremantle 12.15 (87)	def.	Subiaco 13.8 (86)	Fremantle Oval (crowd: 2077)
Monday, 12 April (2:15 pm)	East Perth 13.11 (89)	def.	East Fremantle 13.9 (87)	Leederville Oval (crowd: 2367)
	Bye; Claremont
Swan Districts kick crucial goals during time-on of the second and third quarters to ensure a more-competitive Peel team under Garry Hocking does not approach its first win.; Two thrilling games see the Fremantle clubs winless with Peel after four rounds, with Shark Jason Morgan denied an apparently fair goal after he toed the ball through a pack.

=== Round 5 ===
	Round 5
Saturday, 17 April (2:15 pm)	East Fremantle 17.6 (108)	def.	West Perth 15.13 (103)	East Fremantle Oval (crowd: 1328)
Saturday, 17 April (5:40 pm)	Peel Thunder 11.14 (80)	def. by	South Fremantle 23.16 (154)	Rushton Park (crowd: 1182)
Sunday, 18 April (2:15 pm)	Claremont 12.5 (77)	def.	East Perth 7.12 (54)	Claremont Oval (crowd: 1998)
Sunday, 18 April (2:15 pm)	Perth 18.15 (123)	def.	Swan Districts 11.6 (72)	Lathlain Park (crowd: 1690)
	Bye; Subiaco

=== Round 6 ===
	Round 6
Friday, 23 April (6:45 pm)	Subiaco 20.9 (129)	def.	Peel Thunder 11.7 (73)	Leederville Oval (crowd: 1592)
Saturday, 24 April (2:15 pm)	Swan Districts 14.11 (95)	def.	East Fremantle 12.9 (81)	Bassendean Oval (crowd: 1922)
Saturday, 24 April (2:15 pm)	South Fremantle 18.15 (123)	def.	Perth 12.10 (82)	Fremantle Oval (crowd: 1490)
Saturday, 24 April (2:15 pm)	West Perth 10.4 (64)	def. by	Claremont 13.17 (95)	Arena Joondalup (crowd: 1655)
	Bye; East Perth
Subiaco kick fifteen goals without Peel scoring after the winless and crippled Thunder led 6.4 (40) to 2.5 (17) early in the second quarter.

=== Round 7 ===
	Round 7
Friday, 30 April (6:45 pm)	East Perth 11.13 (79)	def.	West Perth 11.12 (78)	Leederville Oval (crowd: 3410)
Saturday, 1 May (2:15 pm)	Claremont 6.12 (48)	def. by	Swan Districts 8.10 (58)	Claremont Oval (crowd: 1811)
Saturday, 1 May (2:15 pm)	Perth 15.6 (96)	def.	Subiaco 8.10 (58)	Cunderdin (crowd: 1678)
Sunday, 2 May (2:15 pm)	East Fremantle 13.9 (87)	def. by	South Fremantle 14.10 (94)	East Fremantle Oval (crowd: 3065)
	Bye; Peel Thunder
Shane Beros, with fifteen possessions in the last quarter, takes advantage of Swan Districts' ability to turn the match into a stop-start affair and inflicts Claremont's first defeat.; Three late goals from Haydn North stop the Sharks from achieving a major upset despite another eight goals from Simister – who had now scored twenty in three matches.

=== Round 8 ===
	Round 8
Friday, 7 May (6:45 pm)	East Perth 7.11 (53)	def. by	Subiaco 12.9 (81)	Leederville Oval (crowd: 2447)
Saturday, 8 May (2:15 pm)	Peel Thunder 14.12 (96)	def. by	Claremont 13.19 (97)	Rushton Park (crowd: 1145)
	Bye; East Fremantle, Perth, South Fremantle, Swan Districts, West Perth
Claremont, unsettled by movements into and out of the AFL, avoid a huge upset only via a late behind from Anthony Jones. Victorian import Cameron Gauci kicks seven for Peel.; The result constituted the first time a WAFL/Westar Rules team had won scoring fewer goals since West Perth beat Subiaco in Round 14 of 1998.

=== Round 9 ===
	Round 9
Saturday, 15 May (2:15 pm)	Peel Thunder 10.8 (68)	def. by	Swan Districts 14.13 (97)	Rushton Park (crowd: 1678)
Saturday, 15 May (2:15 pm)	Subiaco 11.6 (72)	def. by	South Fremantle 10.16 (76)	Leederville Oval (crowd: 1337)
Saturday, 15 May (2:15 pm)	East Fremantle 7.13 (55)	def. by	East Perth 10.10 (70)	East Fremantle Oval (crowd: 1347)
Sunday, 16 May (2:15 pm)	Perth 12.12 (84)	def.	West Perth 8.14 (62)	Lathlain Park (crowd: 1692)
	Bye; Claremont
The hospitalisation of coach John Dimmer with a stomach cramp does not disturb South Fremantle and they produce an amazing last-quarter comeback where they go inside fifty metres twenty-five times to Subiaco's three.; A classy first half before persistent rain comes ensures Swans win as expected in a celebration for ninety-one-year-old Lal Mosey, the only survivor of their inaugural 1934 team.; East Fremantle coach Rod Lester-Smith's puzzling decision to move top goalkicker Scott Simister to centre half-forward and utility Jason Morgan to full-forward backfires – a fifteen-minute period in the third quarter of continuous attack that could have won the Sharks the game brings only three behinds.

=== Round 10 ===
	Round 10
Saturday, 22 May (2:15 pm)	Peel Thunder 13.13 (91)	def.	South Fremantle 11.15 (81)	Katanning (crowd: 1872)
Saturday, 22 May (2:15 pm)	West Perth 15.14 (104)	def.	East Fremantle 9.17 (71)	Arena Joondalup (crowd: 1224)
Saturday, 22 May (2:15 pm)	Swan Districts 10.7 (67)	def. by	Perth 11.17 (83)	Bassendean Oval (crowd: 2075)
Sunday, 23 May (2:15 pm)	East Perth 14.9 (93)	def. by	Claremont 14.11 (95)	Leederville Oval (crowd: 2297)
	Bye; Subiaco
Peel win their first match for 2004 with hard running and strong tackling at the finish after South Fremantle took the lead coming from several goals down throughout most of the second half.

=== Round 11 ===
	Round 11
Saturday, 29 May (2:15 pm)	Claremont 14.12 (96)	def.	West Perth 10.7 (67)	Claremont Oval (crowd: 1704)
Sunday, 30 May (2:15 pm)	Peel Thunder 7.6 (48)	def. by	Subiaco 17.11 (113)	Rushton Park (crowd: 1314)
Sunday, 30 May (2:15 pm)	Perth 15.8 (98)	def.	South Fremantle 10.13 (73)	Lathlain Park (crowd: 1894)
Sunday, 30 May (2:15 pm)	East Fremantle 8.9 (57)	def. by	Swan Districts 11.9 (75)	East Fremantle Oval (crowd: 1735)
	Bye; East Perth
Perth, despite lacking a ruckman after Nigel Edwards was injured, climb to third with their win over South Fremantle, who held on until late in the last quarter but were only briefly on top during the third.

=== Round 12 ===
	Round 12
Saturday, 5 June (2:15 pm)	Subiaco 16.6 (102)	def.	Perth 12.3 (75)	Leederville Oval (crowd: 1495)
Saturday, 5 June (2:15 pm)	Swan Districts 11.8 (74)	def.	Claremont 3.9 (27)	Bassendean Oval (crowd: 1973)
Monday, 7 June (2:15 pm)	South Fremantle 17.11 (113)	def.	East Fremantle 4.7 (31)	Fremantle Oval (crowd: 4214)
Monday, 7 June (2:15 pm)	West Perth 9.6 (60)	def. by	East Perth 12.14 (86)	Arena Joondalup (crowd: 3922)
	Bye; Peel Thunder
Claremont kick the lowest score ever by a visiting team at Bassendean Oval, with the previous lowest being 4.6 (30) by Peel the previous season.; Despite losing the toss on a very windy afternoon and finishing with nineteen fit men after a physical struggle, Swans' miserly defence completely blankets the league leader.; In front of the biggest crowd of the home-and-away season, East Fremantle show an extraordinary lack of skill and discipline in wet conditions – giving away four frees behind play whilst in possession – and South achieve six consecutive wins over their rivals for the first time since the 1917 Grand Final.

=== Round 13 ===
	Round 13
Saturday, 12 June (2:15 pm)	Claremont 11.4 (70)	def.	South Fremantle 8.6 (54)	Denmark (crowd: 2500)
Saturday, 12 June (2:15 pm)	Perth 12.18 (90)	def.	Peel Thunder 8.12 (60)	Lathlain Park (crowd: 1148)
Saturday, 12 June (2:15 pm)	East Fremantle 11.15 (81)	def. by	Subiaco 14.13 (97)	East Fremantle Oval (crowd: 1260)
Sunday, 13 June (2:15 pm)	East Perth 9.9 (63)	def. by	Swan Districts 11.12 (78)	Leederville Oval (crowd: 2820)
	Bye; West Perth
In a violent match won well by Perth after half-time, Peel allege Daniel Haines was struck twice and that their treatment by WAFL umpires is unfair compared to the older clubs.

=== Round 14 ===
	Round 14
Saturday, 26 June (2:15 pm)	Subiaco 15.10 (100)	def.	Claremont 14.7 (91)	Leederville Oval (crowd: 2235)
Saturday, 26 June (2:15 pm)	South Fremantle 13.12 (90)	def.	East Perth 11.10 (76)	Fremantle Oval (crowd: 2130)
Saturday, 26 June (2:15 pm)	Peel Thunder 18.5 (113)	def.	East Fremantle 14.6 (90)	Rushton Park (crowd: 1707)
Saturday, 26 June (2:15 pm)	Swan Districts 23.8 (146)	def.	West Perth 10.4 (64)	Bassendean Oval (crowd: 3185)
	Bye; Perth
Swans expose West Perth's extreme lack of height (only one player taller than 188 centimetres or 6.17 feet) and injury (only seven 2003 premiership players) to celebrate the retitling of Bassendean as ‘Steel Blue Oval' in superb style.; Unsuccessful WAFL state captain Brad Smith confirms his status as the league's most eminent player with five first-half goals, which leaves Claremont winning the $5000 prize for best club after fourteen rounds by a single point due to the deduction of Peel's 70 points from the opening round.; In his first WAFL game since the third round of 1999, Shaun McManus has 35 possessions despite blistered feet, but despite this and six second-quarter goals from fourth-gamer Andrew Wilkie the once proud Sharks move to the bottom as Peel prove much too consistent.

=== Round 15 ===
	Round 15
Friday, 2 July (6:45 pm)	East Perth 8.9 (57)	def. by	Subiaco 11.9 (75)	Leederville Oval (crowd: 1301)
Saturday, 3 July (2:15 pm)	Claremont 17.12 (114)	def.	Peel Thunder 6.10 (46)	Claremont Oval (crowd: 1028)
Saturday, 3 July (2:15 pm)	West Perth 14.9 (93)	def.	South Fremantle 11.9 (75)	Arena Joondalup (crowd: 1109)
Saturday, 3 July (2:15 pm)	East Fremantle 11.7 (73)	def. by	Perth 14.5 (89)	East Fremantle Oval (crowd: 1359)
	Bye; Swan Districts
East Perth suffer an amazing collapse after kicking 8.6 (54) to 2.2 (14) early in the second quarter, scoring only 0.3 (3) to 9.5 (59) for the rest of the match.; West Perth overcome the loss of Helen Logan (Note: Mother of then-current players Brendon and Adam Logan, and wife of former premiership player Ian Logan.) and after attending her Friday funeral they fought out the match as a "mark of respect".; Perth overcome a twenty-day break to move a game clear in the four with an impressive display of accuracy in tough conditions.

=== Round 16 ===
	Round 16
Saturday, 10 July (2:15 pm)	Peel Thunder 12.10 (82)	def. by	East Perth 15.7 (97)	Rushton Park (crowd: 1208)
Saturday, 10 July (2:15 pm)	Subiaco 15.8 (98)	def. by	West Perth 16.13 (109)	Leederville Oval (crowd: 1681)
Saturday, 10 July (2:15 pm)	South Fremantle 17.16 (118)	def.	Swan Districts 9.7 (61)	Fremantle Oval (crowd: 1603)
Saturday, 10 July (2:15 pm)	Perth 4.4 (28)	def. by	Claremont 28.18 (186)	Lathlain Park (crowd: 1536)
	Bye; East Fremantle
West Perth coach Darren Harris attach the WAFL's send-off rule after Simon Duckworth was ejected for using abusive language to a goal umpire. Brendon Logan nonetheless leads the Falcons to a fine win over the eventual premiers.; Perth kick their lowest score against Claremont, beating 4.9 (33) from 1991. the Demons had key forward Simon Rudd reported and faced a "please explain" over their supporters' abuse of field umpires.; Perth's reserves – needing players from Sunday League club Kenwick to field a team at all – scored only 0.1 (1) to Claremont's 18.24 (132), with the sole behind being rushed in the last quarter.

=== Round 17 ===
	Round 17
Saturday, 17 July (2:15 pm)	Claremont 15.21 (111)	def.	East Fremantle 10.8 (68)	Claremont Oval (crowd: 1712)
Saturday, 17 July (2:15 pm)	Subiaco 16.3 (99)	def.	Swan Districts 12.5 (77)	Port Hedland (crowd: 1434)
Saturday, 17 July (2:15 pm)	East Perth 16.13 (109)	def.	Perth 6.11 (47)	Leederville Oval (crowd: 1946)
Saturday, 17 July (2:15 pm)	West Perth 9.11 (65)	def. by	Peel Thunder 10.11 (71)	Arena Joondalup (crowd: 1414)
	Bye; South Fremantle
Brandon Hill becomes the first Peel player to reach one hundred WAFL/Westar Rules games and, despite possibly the mark of the year from Troy Longmuir, Peel win at Joondalup for the first time – in the process virtually ending West Perth's chances to defend their premiership.; Despite Troy Wilson kicking 2.9 (21), Perth suffer another embarrassment and Andrew Merrington from centre half-forward scores 5.1 (31) and Demon defender Rob Rushton gives a gift goal by kicking the ball thirty metres backwards to Merrington during the third quarter.

=== Round 18 ===
	Round 18
Saturday, 24 July (2:15 pm)	Swan Districts 10.8 (68)	def. by	Peel Thunder 10.14 (74)	Bassendean Oval (crowd: 1974)
Sunday, 25 July (2:15 pm)	South Fremantle 9.12 (66)	def. by	Subiaco 14.10 (94)	Fremantle Oval (crowd: 1657)
Sunday, 25 July (2:15 pm)	East Perth 14.13 (97)	def.	East Fremantle 12.9 (81)	Leederville Oval (crowd: 1789)
Sunday, 25 July (2:15 pm)	West Perth 19.6 (120)	def.	Perth 11.10 (76)	Arena Joondalup (crowd: 1615)
	Bye; Claremont
East Perth squander a chance for a huge victory and much-needed percentage when they let East Fremantle come back from 1.6 (12) to 7.10 (52) at half-time to only sixteen points down at the finish – leaving the Royals well behinds South Fremantle and Swan districts on percentage.; This time Subiaco hang on against South Fremantle to cement their double-chance berth against an opponent lacking key forward Ryan Murphy.; Peel record their first win at the newly christened "Steel Blue Oval" and their twenty-fifth as a WAFL/Westar Rules club via the directness of their play and Fremantle squad rover Dylan Smith's tenacity – thereby making East Fremantle almost certain of a first wooden spoon in 106 years.

=== Round 19 ===
	Round 19
Saturday, 31 July (2:15 pm)	East Fremantle 15.13 (103)	def.	West Perth 12.17 (89)	East Fremantle Oval (crowd: 1243)
Saturday, 31 July (2:15 pm)	Perth 13.11 (89)	def.	Swan Districts 11.18 (84)	Lathlain Park (crowd: 1456)
Saturday, 31 July (2:15 pm)	Peel Thunder 15.9 (99)	def. by	South Fremantle 20.11 (131)	Rushton Park (crowd: 1423)
Saturday, 31 July (2:15 pm)	Claremont 11.8 (74)	def. by	East Perth 12.6 (78)	Claremont Oval (crowd: 1771)
	Bye; Subiaco
Perth rebound from three humiliating losses to be only percentage out of the four as the club's character shines through despite poor disposal and weak second and third quarters.; East Perth move (though with a remaining bye) to third with a surprise win led by last-minute recall Adam Pickering, who collects twenty-six possessions and shuts out John Crabb.; Brent Jones' kicking practice pays off as he kicks a towering 55-metre goal that, along with the move of Leath Teakle onto Longmuir, shouts out the West Perth attack for East Fremantle's second win of 2004.

=== Round 20 ===
	Round 20
Saturday, 7 August (2:15 pm)	West Perth 17.7 (109)	def.	Claremont 5.12 (42)	Arena Joondalup (crowd: 1578)
Saturday, 7 August (2:15 pm)	Subiaco 23.8 (146)	def.	Peel Thunder 9.6 (60)	Leederville Oval (crowd: 1375)
Saturday, 7 August (2:15 pm)	South Fremantle 12.19 (91)	def.	Perth 7.7 (49)	Fremantle Oval (crowd: 1488)
Saturday, 7 August (2:15 pm)	Swan Districts 23.13 (151)	def.	East Fremantle 8.11 (59)	Bassendean Oval (crowd: 2139)
	Bye; East Perth
After holding East Fremantle to 0.5 (5) with the wind in the opening quarter, Swan Districts kick 22.9 (141) in the final three quarters to seal the wooden spoon and end a worrying four-match slump.; West Perth, via exceptionally fierce tackling, kick fifteen unanswered goals until the last minute of the game to show that, though out of the running, they could still shape the four.; Perth's lack of height, with no player above 192 centimetres (6 ft 4 in), is cruelly exposed by South Fremantle, who show with their victory that they could be a danger to Claremont and Subiaco in September.

=== Round 21 ===
	Round 21
Friday, 13 August (6:45 pm)	East Perth 11.7 (73)	def. by	West Perth 11.10 (76)	Leederville Oval (crowd: 1944)
Saturday, 14 August (2:15 pm)	East Fremantle 11.6 (72)	def. by	South Fremantle 13.19 (97)	East Fremantle Oval (crowd: 2165)
Saturday, 14 August (2:15 pm)	Claremont 27.13 (175)	def.	Swan Districts 8.7 (55)	Claremont Oval (crowd: 1668)
Saturday, 14 August (2:15 pm)	Perth 11.11 (77)	def.	Subiaco 11.8 (74)	Lathlain Park (crowd: 1324)
	Bye; Peel Thunder
Swan Districts are forced into physical training on the Sunday as they produce an insipid last three quarters where – with the advantage of the breeze in two of them – they score 6.5 (41) to Claremont's 23.9 (147).; An unusual incident whereby a kick by Hayden North during time-on in the last quarter struck a seagull does not disturb South Fremantle's matchwinning burst.

=== Round 22 ===
	Round 22
Saturday, 21 August (2:15 pm)	South Fremantle 10.10 (70)	def.	Claremont 7.17 (59)	Fremantle Oval (crowd: 2002)
Saturday, 21 August (2:15 pm)	Swan Districts 16.7 (103)	def.	East Perth 10.6 (66)	Bassendean Oval (crowd: 2888)
Saturday, 21 August (2:15 pm)	Peel Thunder 12.7 (79)	def.	Perth 10.11 (71)	Rushton Park (crowd: 1378)
Saturday, 21 August (2:15 pm)	Subiaco 20.15 (135)	def.	East Fremantle 12.8 (80)	Leederville Oval (crowd: 1036)
	Bye; West Perth
With Brad Smith clearly headed for the AFL in 2005, (Note: Smith was drafted by West Coast, but knee injuries meant he never played a single AFL match.) Subiaco found a ready-made replacement in former defender Sam Larkins, who combines with Smith for eleven goals as the Lions run away after East Fremantle looked within reach of an upset for a brief period in the third quarter.; An amazingly selfless act of courage by Shane Creevey allows Peel to hang on after being 39 points ahead at three-quarter time. Creevey absorbed a very hard bump from Perth forward Simon Rudd and managed to clear the ball. It was Creevey's fiftieth match and he copped a knee in the side.

=== Round 23 ===
	Round 23
Friday, 27 August (6:45 pm)	East Perth 11.13 (79)	def.	South Fremantle 3.4 (22)	Leederville Oval (crowd: 1319)
Saturday, 28 August (2:15 pm)	East Fremantle 13.13 (91)	def.	Peel Thunder 10.7 (67)	East Fremantle Oval (crowd: 1223)
Saturday, 28 August (2:15 pm)	West Perth 12.15 (87)	def. by	Swan Districts 13.10 (88)	Arena Joondalup (crowd: 1784)
Saturday, 28 August (2:15 pm)	Claremont 10.5 (65)	def. by	Subiaco 15.10 (100)	Claremont Oval (crowd: 1673)
	Bye; Perth
South Fremantle's score, on a wet night, was their lowest open-age score since kicking 2.7 (19) against East Fremantle in Round 9, 1926, and their lowest against East Perth since kicking 1.0 (6) in Round 2, 1918.; Troy Wilson kicks six in the cool, wet and very windy conditions, and the Royals kicked 4.3 (27) into the wind in the third quarter to stay in the running for the finals.; Swan Districts had to lose by 17 or more points for the Royals to get in, but won their first victory at Joondalup since 1994 to get into the finals for the first time since that season.; Subiaco win the minor premiership and the $5,000 "Prestige Loans Award", (Note: The "Prestige Loans Award" was given to the club with the best result between Rounds 15 and 23, during which the nine WAFL clubs played each other once.) but coach Peter German denies any advantage because he believes the win will simply make Claremont study the Lions' game more intensely.

== Ladder ==
2004 WAFL ladder
Pos	Team	Pld	W	L	D	PF	PA	PP	Pts
1	Subiaco (P)	20	15	5	0	1963	1489	131.8	60
2	Claremont	20	13	7	0	1881	1383	136.0	52
3	South Fremantle	20	12	8	0	1744	1562	111.7	48
4	Swan Districts	20	12	8	0	1731	1643	105.4	48
5	East Perth	20	11	9	0	1590	1526	104.2	44
6	Perth	20	10	10	0	1587	1785	88.9	40
7	West Perth	20	9	11	0	1722	1676	102.7	36
8	Peel Thunder	20	5	15	0	1449	2082	69.6	20
9	East Fremantle	20	3	17	0	1532	2053	74.6	12

Source: "2004 Ladder". WAFL Footy Facts.
Rules for classification: 1) points; 2) percentage; 3) number of points for.
(P) Premiers

== Finals ==
=== Semi-finals ===
	First semi-final
Sunday, 5 September (2:15 pm)	South Fremantle 12.12 (84)	def. by	Swan Districts 21.8 (134)	Subiaco Oval (crowd: 6,223)
In their first final since 1994 Swan Districts repel conclusively a third-quarter Bulldog challenge with six straight last quarter goals, three of them from Adam Lange. Swans wingman Craig DeCorsey kicks six goals, five in the first half.

	Second semi-final
Sunday, 5 September (5:45 pm)	Subiaco 19.14 (128)	def.	Claremont 9.14 (68)	Subiaco Oval (crowd: 5,773)
Subiaco dominate Claremont throughout the first three quarters, and Brad Smith becomes the first WAFL/Westar Rules player to kick 100 goals since Jon Dorotich in 1997.

=== Preliminary final ===
	Preliminary final
Sunday, 12 September (2:15 pm)	Claremont 16.12 (108)	def.	Swan Districts 9.17 (71)	Subiaco Oval (crowd: 7,508)
Claremont show up Swans' lack of finals experience as the black and whites go from 2.0 (12) to 2.12 (24) between the 10-minute mark of the opening quarter and time on in the third.; The final margin flatters Swan Districts who kick the last five goals.; Anthony Jones, normally a backman, plays a key role for the Tigers at centre half-forward.

=== Grand Final ===
2004 WAFL Grand Final
Sunday, 19 September	Subiaco	def.	Claremont	Subiaco Oval (crowd: 21,507)
5.3 (33); 7.6 (48); 10.8 (68); 15.9 (99)	Q1; Q2; Q3; Final	2.1 (13); 4.5 (29); 5.6 (36); 7.9 (51)	Umpires: David Corcoran, Luke Farmer, Mark Fussell; Simpson Medal: Paul Vines (Subiaco)
Smith 5, Larkins 4, Cossom, Vines, Haines, Beattie, Miller, Ambrose	Goals	Anthony Jones 3, Crabb, Cunningham, Wira, Crwford
Vines, Larkins, Holmes, Wooden, Cossan, Newick, Smith	Best	Harding, Brett Jones, Anthony Jones, Kowal, Crwaford
Maloney (thigh); Beattie (concussion)	Injuries	Wira (hamstring)
Sam Larkins provides a perfect antidote to Claremont's targetting of leading goalkicker Smith, and the Tigers do not take control at any stage, as eight unanswed goals in the second half ensure Subiaco's first premiership since 1988.
