= 1995 TFL Statewide League season =

- Teams: Burnie Dockers; Clarence Kangaroos; Devonport Blues; Glenorchy Magpies; Hobart Tigers; Launceston Raiders; New Norfolk Eagles; North Hobart Demons; North Launceston Robins; Sandy Bay Seagulls; South Launceston Bulldogs
- Premiers: North Launceston
- Minor premiers: North Launceston; 4th minor premiership

Attendance
- Matches played: 105
- Total attendance: 143,827 (1,370 per match)

The 1995 TFL Statewide League premiership season was an Australian rules football competition, staged across Tasmania, Australia over twenty roster rounds and six finals series matches between 8 April and 23 September 1995.

This was the tenth season of statewide football and the League was known as the Cascade-Boags Draught Super League under a dual commercial naming-rights sponsorship agreement with both Cascade Brewery in Hobart and Boag's Brewery in Launceston.

== Participating clubs ==
- Burnie Dockers Football Club
- Clarence District Football Club
- Devonport Football Club
- Glenorchy District Football Club
- Hobart Football Club
- Launceston Football Club
- New Norfolk District Football Club
- North Hobart Football Club
- North Launceston Football Club
- Sandy Bay Football Club
- South Launceston Football Club

=== 1995 TFL Statewide League Club Coaches ===
- Peter German (Burnie Dockers)
- Stevie Wright (Clarence)
- Andy Goodwin (Devonport)
- Kim Excell (Glenorchy)
- Wayne Petterd (Hobart)
- Peter Chisnall (Launceston)
- Darren Dennemann (New Norfolk)
- Ricky Hanlon (North Hobart)
- David Rhys-Jones (North Launceston)
- Michael Hibberd & Lance Spaulding (Sandy Bay)
- Dale Weightman (South Launceston)

=== TFL Statewide League Reserves Grand Final ===
- Nth Hobart 22.7 (139) v New Norfolk 12.9 (81) – North Hobart Oval

=== TFL Statewide League Colts (Under-19's) Grand Final ===
- Nth Hobart 19.10 (124) v Glenorchy 9.9 (63) – North Hobart Oval

=== TFL Fourths (Under-17's) Grand Final ===
- Glenorchy 12.8 (80) v Nth Hobart 11.12 (78) – KGV Football Park

=== Leading Goalkickers: TFL Statewide League ===
- Byron Howard Jnr (Nth Hobart) – 104
- Simon Byrne (Glenorchy) – 99
- Michael McGregor (Sandy Bay) – 93
- S.Smith (Sth Launceston) – 79

=== Medal Winners ===
- Danny Noonan (Clarence) & Geoff Wiggins (Sandy Bay) – William Leitch Medal
- Andrew McLean (Nth Launceston) – Darrel Baldock Medal (Best player in TFL Grand Final)
- Jeremy Busch (Nth Hobart) – George Watt Medal (Reserves)
- Ricky Braslin (New Norfolk) – V.A Geard Medal (Under-19's)
- Craig Haremza (New Norfolk) & Damian Triffitt (New Norfolk) – D.R Plaister Medal (Under-17's)

=== Interstate Matches ===
Interstate Match (Saturday, 13 May 1995)

- Tasmania 14.15 (99) v South Australia 12.12 (84) – Att: 4,198 at North Hobart Oval

== 1995 TFL Statewide League Ladder ==
Pos	Team	Pld	W	L	D	B	PF	PA	PP	Pts
1	North Launceston	18	17	1	0	2	2428	1189	204.2	68
2	Clarence	18	16	2	0	2	2362	1379	171.3	64
3	New Norfolk	18	13	5	0	2	1857	1514	122.7	52
4	Devonport	18	11	6	1	2	1938	1563	124.0	46
5	Burnie Dockers	18	11	7	0	2	1998	1526	130.9	44
6	Glenorchy	18	10	8	0	2	1881	1695	111.0	40
7	North Hobart	18	8	10	0	2	1594	1682	94.8	32
8	Sandy Bay	18	6	11	1	2	1702	1934	88.0	26
9	Hobart	18	2	16	0	2	1317	2038	64.6	8
10	South Launceston	18	2	16	0	2	1549	2453	63.1	8 (Note: South Launceston were stripped of four premiership points after defeating Launceston in Round 10 due to fielding an unregistered player, four points were awarded to Launceston.)
11	Launceston	18	2	16	0	2	1001	2668	37.5	8

=== Round 1 ===
(Saturday, 8 April & Sunday, 9 April 1995)

- Glenorchy 19.12 (126) v Nth Hobart 18.13 (121) – Att: 1,070 at KGV Football Park
- New Norfolk 13.8 (86) v Clarence 7.13 (55) – Att: 1,386 at Bellerive Oval
- Launceston 13.15 (93) v Hobart 11.16 (82) – Att: 490 at Windsor Park
- Nth Launceston 16.11 (107) v Burnie Dockers 14.7 (91) – Att: 1,620 at West Park Oval (Night)
- Sandy Bay 16.14 (110) v Sth Launceston 13.9 (87) – Att: 877 at North Hobart Oval (Sunday)
- Bye: Devonport.

=== Round 2 ===
(Saturday, 15 April & Monday, 17 April 1995)

- Nth Hobart 15.14 (104) v Hobart 10.10 (70) – Att: 1,401 at North Hobart Oval
- New Norfolk 21.22 (148) v Burnie Dockers 15.13 (103) – Att: 1,231 at Boyer Oval
- Devonport 28.27 (195) v Launceston 7.7 (49) – Att: 1,475 at Devonport Oval
- Glenorchy 20.16 (136) v Sandy Bay 11.10 (76) – Att: 1,844 at North Hobart Oval (Monday)

Bye: Clarence, Sth Launceston & Nth Launceston.

=== Round 3 ===
(Saturday, 22 April & Sunday, 23 April 1995)

- Devonport 19.11 (125) v Nth Hobart 9.11 (65) – Att: 1,006 at North Hobart Oval
- Clarence 18.13 (121) v Glenorchy 9.16 (70) – Att: 1,816 at Bellerive Oval
- Nth Launceston 18.17 (125) v New Norfolk 14.7 (91) – Att: 1,351 at York Park
- Burnie Dockers 18.8 (116) v Sth Launceston 17.12 (114) – Att: 1,419 at West Park Oval (Night)
- Hobart 16.13 (109) v Sandy Bay 12.6 (78) – Att: 1,487 at Snug Park (Sunday)
- Bye: Launceston.

=== Round 4 ===
(Saturday, 29 April & Sunday, 30 April 1995)

- Clarence 13.27 (105) v Hobart 6.9 (45) – Att: 1,140 at North Hobart Oval
- Glenorchy 12.16 (88) v Burnie Dockers 8.10 (58) – Att: 1,238 at KGV Football Park
- New Norfolk 18.25 (133) v Sth Launceston 8.10 (58) – Att: 641 at Youngtown Memorial Ground
- Devonport 21.18 (144) v Sandy Bay 17.14 (116) – Att: 2,000 at Devonport Oval
- Nth Launceston 24.12 (156) v Launceston 3.5 (23) – Att: 890 at York Park (Sunday)
- Bye: Nth Hobart.

=== Round 5 ===
(Saturday, 6 May & Sunday, 7 May 1995)

- Nth Hobart 21.20 (146) v Launceston 7.10 (52) – Att: 867 at North Hobart Oval
- Clarence 20.18 (138) v Devonport 15.8 (98) – Att: 1,296 at Bellerive Oval
- Nth Launceston 21.30 (156) v Sth Launceston 7.10 (52) – Att: 818 at Youngtown Memorial Ground
- Burnie Dockers 30.24 (204) v Hobart 7.6 (48) – Att: 970 at West Park Oval
- New Norfolk 21.17 (143) v Glenorchy 9.4 (58) – Att: 2,459 at Boyer Oval (Sunday)
- Bye: Sandy Bay

=== Round 6 ===
(Saturday, 20 May & Sunday, 21 May 1995)

- New Norfolk 20.14 (134) v Hobart 9.13 (67) – Att: 1,049 at North Hobart Oval
- Nth Launceston 12.11 (83) v Nth Hobart 12.9 (81) – Att: 1,128 at York Park
- Sandy Bay 20.24 (144) v Launceston 12.6 (78) – Att: 607 at Windsor Park
- Clarence 27.19 (181) v Sth Launceston 11.12 (78) – Att: 590 at Youngtown Memorial Ground (Sunday)
- Devonport 11.15 (81) v Burnie Dockers 10.13 (73) – Att: 4,012 at Devonport Oval (Sunday)
- Bye: Glenorchy

=== Round 7 ===
(Saturday, 27 May 1995)

- Nth Hobart 13.13 (91) v Sandy Bay 13.11 (89) – Att: 1,043 at North Hobart Oval
- Nth Launceston 28.15 (183) v Glenorchy 8.9 (57) – Att: 1,070 at KGV Football Park
- Clarence 28.30 (198) v Launceston 6.4 (40) – Att: 719 at Bellerive Oval
- New Norfolk 11.12 (78) v Devonport 10.11 (71) – Att: 1,192 at Boyer Oval
- Sth Launceston 12.10 (82) v Hobart 8.19 (67) – Att: 581 at Youngtown Memorial Ground
- Bye: Burnie Dockers.

=== Round 8 ===
(Saturday, 3 June & Sunday, 4 June 1995)

- Glenorchy 24.16 (160) v Hobart 8.11 (59) – Att: 1,157 at North Hobart Oval
- Nth Launceston 30.14 (194) v Sandy Bay 7.8 (50) – Att: 921 at York Park
- Burnie Dockers 29.22 (196) v Launceston 8.2 (50) – Att: 604 at Windsor Park
- Devonport 17.19 (121) v Sth Launceston 5.15 (45) – Att: 1,134 at Devonport Oval
- Clarence 22.13 (145) v Nth Hobart 13.9 (87) – Att: 1,713 at North Hobart Oval (Sunday)
- Bye: New Norfolk.

=== Round 9 ===
(Saturday, 10 June 1995)

- Burnie Dockers 13.7 (85) v Nth Hobart 8.10 (58) – Att: 911 at West Park Oval
- Devonport 17.14 (116) v Glenorchy 11.15 (81) – Att: 1,057 at KGV Football Park
- Nth Launceston 15.13 (103) v Hobart 11.13 (79) – Att: 748 at North Hobart Oval
- Clarence 22.16 (148) v Sandy Bay 11.9 (75) – Att: 977 at Bellerive Oval
- New Norfolk 14.21 (105) v Launceston 9.5 (59) – Att: 978 at Boyer Oval
- Bye: Sth Launceston

=== Round 10 ===
(Saturday, 17 June & Sunday, 18 June 1995)

- Burnie Dockers 15.11 (101) v Sandy Bay 13.10 (88) – Att: 626 at North Hobart Oval
- Nth Launceston 17.12 (114) v Clarence 8.18 (66) – Att: 3,687 at York Park
- Devonport 18.14 (122) v Hobart 9.14 (68) – Att: 1,101 at Devonport Oval
- New Norfolk 15.17 (107) v Nth Hobart 14.18 (102) – Att: 1,777 at North Hobart Oval (Sunday)
- Sth Launceston 17.16 (118) v Launceston 13.13 (91) – Att: 729 at Windsor Park (Sunday) *
- Bye: Glenorchy.

Note: Sth Launceston later deducted four premiership points for playing an unregistered player in this match.

=== Round 11 ===
(Saturday, 24 June & Sunday, 25 June 1995)

- Nth Hobart 19.17 (131) v Sth Launceston 11.14 (80) – Att: 937 at North Hobart Oval
- Glenorchy 27.22 (184) v Launceston 3.12 (30) – Att: 779 at KGV Football Park
- New Norfolk 19.10 (124) v Sandy Bay 13.11 (89) – Att: 1,084 at Boyer Oval
- Clarence 18.12 (120) v Burnie Dockers 17.6 (108) – Att: 1,217 at West Park Oval
- Nth Launceston 12.13 (85) v Devonport 8.13 (61) – Att: 3,053 at York Park (Sunday)
- Bye: Hobart.

=== Round 12 ===
(Saturday, 1 July & Sunday, 2 July 1995)

- Hobart 17.14 (116) v Launceston 5.2 (32) – Att: 522 at North Hobart Oval
- Glenorchy 14.12 (96) v Nth Hobart 14.7 (91) – Att: 1,196 at KGV Football Park
- Burnie Dockers 14.12 (96) v Nth Launceston 13.14 (92) – Att: 1,568 at York Park
- Sandy Bay 26.20 (176) v Sth Launceston 19.10 (124) – Att: 571 at Youngtown Memorial Ground
- Clarence 15.13 (103) v New Norfolk 8.17 (65) – Att: 2,589 at Boyer Oval (Sunday)
- Bye: Devonport.

=== Round 13 ===
(Saturday, 8 July & Sunday 9 July 1995)

- Glenorchy 17.14 (116) v Sandy Bay 15.11 (101) – Att: 1,061 at KGV Football Park
- Clarence 16.25 (121) v Sth Launceston 14.10 (94) – Att: 988 at Bellerive Oval
- Devonport 20.15 (135) v Launceston 14.8 (92) – Att: 692 at Windsor Park
- Burnie Dockers 20.8 (128) v New Norfolk 13.11 (89) – Att: 1,375 at West Park Oval
- Nth Hobart 15.14 (104) v Hobart 12.15 (87) – Att: 1,695 at TCA Ground (Sunday)
- Bye: Nth Launceston.

=== Round 14 ===
(Saturday, 15 July & Sunday, 16 July 1995)

- Sandy Bay 15.15 (105) v Hobart 16.5 (101) – Att: 905 at North Hobart Oval
- Nth Launceston 11.12 (78) v New Norfolk 9.12 (66) – Att: 1,026 at Boyer Oval
- Burnie Dockers 19.18 (132) v Sth Launceston 19.15 (129) – Att: 512 at Youngtown Memorial Ground
- Nth Hobart 14.12 (96) v Devonport 13.14 (92) – Att: 1,119 at Devonport Oval
- Clarence 20.20 (140) v Glenorchy 4.13 (37) – Att: 1,887 at KGV Football Park (Sunday)
- Bye: Launceston.

=== Round 15 ===
(Saturday, 22 July 1995)

- Sandy Bay 15.11 (101) v Devonport 14.17 (101) – Att: 661 at North Hobart Oval
- Clarence 27.15 (177) v Hobart 9.10 (64) – Att: 946 at Bellerive Oval
- New Norfolk 21.14 (140) v Sth Launceston 16.11 (107) – Att: 946 at Boyer Oval
- Nth Launceston 24.22 (166) v Launceston 4.4 (28) – Att: 751 at Windsor Park
- Burnie Dockers 12.19 (91) v Glenorchy 8.2 (50) – Att: 1,080 at West Park Oval
- Bye: Nth Hobart.

=== Round 16 ===
(Saturday, 29 July & Sunday, 30 July 1995)

- Burnie Dockers 13.13 (91) v Hobart 5.7 (37) – Att: 554 at North Hobart Oval
- New Norfolk 9.8 (62) v Glenorchy 6.11 (47) – Att: 1,281 at KGV Football Park
- Nth Hobart 13.14 (92) v Launceston 6.2 (38) – Att: 505 at Windsor Park
- Clarence 18.11 (119) v Devonport 14.15 (99) – Att: 1,280 at Devonport Oval
- Nth Launceston 47.14 (296) v Sth Launceston 10.8 (68) – Att: 1,218 at York Park (Sunday) *
- Bye: Sandy Bay.

Note: Nth Launceston sets a TFL all-time record score.

=== Round 17 ===
(Saturday, 5 August & Sunday, 6 August 1995)

- Nth Launceston 16.17 (113) v Nth Hobart 13.3 (81) – Att: 1,380 at North Hobart Oval
- New Norfolk 11.14 (80) v Hobart 11.8 (74) – Att: 869 at Boyer Oval
- Glenorchy 26.26 (182) v Sth Launceston 9.8 (62) – Att: 518 at Youngtown Memorial Ground *
- Sandy Bay 10.14 (74) v Launceston 4.4 (28) – Att: 442 at North Hobart Oval (Sunday)
- Devonport 12.11 (83) v Burnie Dockers 10.4 (64) – Att: 3,465 at West Park Oval (Sunday)
- Bye: Clarence.

Note: Simon Byrne (Glenorchy) sets TFL Statewide record of 17.9 in a single match.

=== Round 18 ===
(Saturday, 12 August & Sunday, 13 August 1995)

- Sth Launceston 15.16 (106) v Hobart 12.9 (81) – Att: 553 at Bellerive Oval *
- Nth Launceston 25.14 (164) v Glenorchy 12.8 (80) – Att: 1,019 at York Park
- Clarence 30.16 (196) v Launceston 13.11 (89) – Att: 401 at Windsor Park
- Devonport 15.14 (104) v New Norfolk 14.15 (99) – Att: 1,599 at Devonport Oval
- Sandy Bay 10.15 (75) v Nth Hobart 6.13 (49) – Att: 1,096 at Queenborough Oval (Sunday) *
- Bye: Burnie Dockers.

Note: Both Hobart & Sandy Bay home fixtures transferred to Bellerive & Queenborough due to unfit surface at North Hobart.

=== Round 19 ===
(Saturday, 19 August 1995)

- Nth Launceston 14.12 (96) v Sandy Bay 9.15 (69) – Att: 693 at North Hobart Oval
- Glenorchy 21.22 (148) v Hobart 10.7 (67) – Att: 842 at KGV Football Park
- Clarence 24.14 (158) v Nth Hobart 9.9 (63) – Att: 1,424 at Bellerive Oval
- Devonport 21.12 (138) v Sth Launceston 12.7 (79) – Att: 566 at Youngtown Memorial Ground
- Burnie Dockers 30.14 (194) v Launceston 11.5 (71) – Att: 946 at West Park Oval
- Bye: New Norfolk.

=== Round 20 ===
(Saturday, 26 August 1995)

- New Norfolk 16.10 (106) v Sandy Bay 13.8 (86) – Att: 714 at North Hobart Oval
- Clarence 10.12 (72) v Burnie Dockers 9.13 (67) – Att: 1,246 at Bellerive Oval
- Nth Hobart 11.14 (80) v Sth Launceston 9.11 (65) – Att: 716 at Youngtown Memorial Ground
- Glenorchy 26.15 (171) v Launceston 7.15 (57) – Att: 508 at Windsor Park
- Nth Launceston 17.13 (115) v Devonport 7.8 (50) – Att: 2,532 at York Park (Sunday)
- Bye: Hobart.

=== Qualifying Final ===
(Saturday, 2 September 1995)

- New Norfolk: 4.3 (27) | 5.8 (38) | 10.10 (70) | 12.12 (84)
- Clarence: 5.4 (34) | 6.8 (44) | 8.12 (60) | 10.14 (74)
- Attendance: 3,206 at North Hobart Oval

=== Elimination Final ===
(Sunday, 3 September 1995)

- Burnie Dockers: 1.1 (7) | 4.5 (29) | 4.9 (33) | 13.13 (91)
- Devonport Blues: 2.2 (14) | 2.3 (15) | 7.6 (48) | 8.6 (54)
- Attendance: 4,315 at Devonport Oval

=== Second Semi Final ===
(Saturday, 9 September 1995)

- Nth Launceston: 4.4 (28) | 5.5 (35) | 7.10 (52) | 12.12 (84)
- New Norfolk: 1.4 (10) | 5.6 (36) | 8.9 (57) | 10.12 (72)
- Attendance: 3,916 at York Park

=== First Semi Final ===
(Sunday, 10 September 1995)

- Clarence Roos: 3.5 (23) | 6.8 (44) | 12.13 (85) | 22.18 (150)
- Burnie Dockers: 4.2 (26) | 8.3 (51) | 10.4 (64) | 10.4 (64)
- Attendance: 2,524 at North Hobart Oval

=== Preliminary Final ===
(Sunday, 17 September 1995)

- Clarence: 6.6 (42) | 10.8 (68) | 11.13 (79) | 14.14 (98)
- New Norfolk: 3.0 (18) | 5.5 (35) | 8.8 (56) | 13.11 (89)
- Attendance: 4,425 at North Hobart Oval

=== Grand Final ===
(Saturday, 23 September 1995) – (ABC-TV highlights: 1995 TFL Grand Final)

- Nth Launceston: 4.5 (29) | 6.5 (41) | 9.8 (62) | 9.11 (65)
- Clarence: 3.2 (20) | 5.9 (39) | 6.11 (47) | 7.13 (55)
- Attendance: 9,448 at North Hobart Oval

Source: All scores and statistics courtesy of the Hobart Mercury, Launceston Examiner and North West Advocate publications.
