= Burnie Hawks Football Club =

Defunct Australian rules football club

Burnie Hawks

Names
- Full name: Burnie Hawks Football Club
- Nickname: Hawks
- Club song: "We're a happy team at Burnie"

Club details
- Founded: 1987
- Dissolved: 1994; 32 years ago
- Colours
- Competition: Tasmanian Football League
- Ground: West Park Oval

Uniforms
Home

The Burnie Hawks Football Club was an Australian rules football club based in Burnie, Tasmania, Australia from 1987 to 1994.

== History ==
The club was founded in 1987 after former North West Football Union (NWFU) club Cooee Bulldogs (1894–1986) closed down its operation in order to wipe out its large debts and rebrand itself with a more metropolitan-based name for its inclusion in the Tasmanian Football League (TFL) in that year.

Cooee had been locked in a battle with its West Park co-tenant (Burnie Tigers) to desperately gain a licence to join the Tasmanian competition from midway through 1986, and it was the rebranding of the club which was seen to have tipped the scales in favour of Cooee/Burnie Hawks.

The move did however cause much controversy with a bitter and at times spiteful rivalry forming with fellow former NWFU and later Northern Tasmanian Football League club Burnie Tigers, so much so that after a period of good onfield success for the new Hawks venture, Burnie Hawks junior development coach and ABC Radio commentator Geoff White stated in an interview on ABC Radio Football on 18 April 1992 that "sponsorship was becoming difficult to obtain, with businesses in the Burnie area refusing to support one club over the other for fear of a backlash by supporters of each club, it's just so divided at the moment, it's a real crying shame because this town (Burnie) could field a great team in State League football."

After making the finals in their inaugural season in 1987 the Hawks, on the back of solid crowd support powered to a preliminary final showdown with Glenorchy the following year but suffered a disastrous 110-point loss to the Magpies at North Hobart Oval. In 1989 and 1990 the Hawks narrowly missed out on finals appearances (their reserves team broke through for a premiership in 1990 however) but despite a finals appearance in 1991, the club was struggling for support and by the following season the club itself was in serious jeopardy with large debts and a rapidly sinking supporter base, so much so that the club had sought a merger with Burnie Tigers, as both clubs were struggling under the harsh economic recession hitting the state at the time.

The Burnie Hawks eventually absorbed the Burnie Tigers after the 1993 season had finished and from 1994, whilst still struggling with poor attendances, would play on as the Burnie Hawks despite the merger.

The Hawks' final season saw them once again play in the finals, their final match saw them defeated by Devonport by 46-points in front of a crowd of 4,210 at Devonport Oval in the 1994 Elimination Final on 4 September.

At the end of 1994 the club signed former North Melbourne player Peter German as captain-coach and one of his first tasks was to attempt to reunify the supporters of both clubs, as a result he adopted a full change of uniforms, colours and a new emblem as the Burnie Dockers.

== Summary ==
- Home ground – West Park Oval
- Established – 1987
- Playing colours – Brown and gold stripes
- Emblem – Hawks
- Club theme song – "We're a happy team at Burnie" (Tune: "Yankee Doodle")
- Affiliations – TFL Statewide League (1987–1994)
- Matches played – 158 (77–79–2) including finals

== Honours ==
=== TFL Premierships ===
Nil

=== TFL Runner Up ===
Nil

=== NWFU Premierships (Cooee) ===
1930, 1931, 1933, 1934, 1935, 1936, 1941, 1961, 1964, 1965, 1973, 1978, 1982

=== Tasmanian State Premierships (Cooee) ===
1964, 1978

=== Individual ===
George Watt Medal winners (Burnie Hawks)
(Best & Fairest Player in TFL Reserves)
1987 – Mark Radford (tied)
1994 – Stephen Jackson

Wander Medallists (Cooee)
(Best & Fairest Player in NWFU Seniors)
1949 – Len Hayes
1950 – Lou Redman
1973 – Graeme Shephard
1979 – Tom Lee

=== Senior Best & Fairest Winners (Burnie Hawks) ===
- 1987 – Dale Whish-Wilson
- 1988 – Wayne Keegan
- 1989 – Steven Cole
- 1990 – Paul Atkins
- 1991 – Paul Atkins
- 1992 – Leigh Heath
- 1993 – Paul Atkins
- 1994 – Brett Jones

=== Senior coaches ===
- 1987 – Warren "Putt" McCarthy
- 1988 – Warren "Putt" McCarthy
- 1989 – Colin Robertson
- 1990 - Mark Scott
- 1991 – Richard Lakeland
- 1992 – Richard Lakeland
- 1993 – Michael Schulze
- 1994 – Mark Lee

=== Club record match attendance ===
- 6,631 – Burnie Hawks v Glenorchy at North Hobart Oval for the 1988 TFL Preliminary Final

=== Club record home attendance ===
- 5,423 – Burnie Hawks v Devonport at West Park Oval on 24 April 1988

=== Club record score ===
- 30.18 (198) – Burnie Hawks v Devonport 18.15 (123) at West Park Oval on 30 July 1989

== Bibliography ==
- Devaney, John P. (2008). Full Points Footy Encyclopedia of Australian Football Clubs. Lulu.com. pp. 56–57. ISBN 978-0-9556897-0-3.
- ABC Radio Football (7ZR and 7NT) – Saturday, 18 April 1992.
