= Walkerville Football Club =

Names
- Full name: Walkerville Football Club
- Nickname: The Cats
- Club song: "The Walky Shuffle"

Club details
- Founded: 1901; 125 years ago
- Colours: White, navy blue
- Competition: Adelaide Footy League
- Ground: Walkerville Oval
- Training ground: Walkerville Oval

Uniforms
Home

Other information
- Official website: walkervillefc.com.au

The Walkerville Football Club, nicknamed the Cats, is an Australian rules football club that plays in the Adelaide Footy League and is based in Walkerville, Adelaide.

== History ==
The Walkerville Football Club was officially founded in 1901 but before then there have been previous Walkerville-based clubs. On 19 April 1876, there was a meeting to start a proposed Walkerville Football Club, and there was a Walkerville club that played at Gilberton in 1883. But the current club was founded in 1901 and took the field in 1902. The club played in the parkland area opposite the Buckingham Arms Hotel and wore red and white colours, playing on an oval located northwest to a field used by the North Adelaide Lacrosse Club. In 1911, the club recruited more men to play for them from the Walkerville Methodist Club, around the time when the club relocated its home ground to 'Pockers Paddock', a ground located on Smith Street, Walkerville. Known as Walkerville United, in 1912, the undefeated club was scheduled to play a match against West Adelaide in the South Australian National Football League but the game was never played.

== Premierships ==
The North Adelaide District Football Association was founded in 1921 where Walkerville was a founding member and won back to back premierships in 1931 and 1932.

In 1936 Walkerville joined the South Australian Amateur Football League and won the SAAFL Division 2 flag against Eastwood and won another in 1940. The club's first Division 1 flag was against Exeter in 1950, winning by 3 points. A second Division 1 flag followed in 1953 after minor premiers University lost to Exeter in their first semi final and played Walkerville who had beaten Exeter in the initial decider. The game was played at Alberton Oval and Walkerville won by 8 points.

In 1955, the club changed to a new guernsey with royal blue and white hoops from a chocolate and blue guernsey and won a 1966 Division 5 flag prior to new clubrooms being built three years later, in 1969.

The 1978 season saw the club relocate to Park 11 (Graduates Oval) in North Adelaide. The club amalgamated with North Adelaide Reserves in 1979 and joined the South Australian Football Association (SAFA) in 1980.

The 1990 move back to the SAAFL saw the Cats a very successful era with three A-Grade premierships in 1990 (D6), 1992 (D4), and 1999 (D3), along with a C-Grade premiership and 6 reserves premierships before the club changed its guernsey again to the current navy blue and white hoops in 1998. After the 1992 Division 4 flag, Walkerville and Flinders Park became the only clubs to win premierships in all grades from Division 1 to Division 6.

Since the 2000s, Walkerville has won another three A-Grade premierships, two in Division 3 in 2003 and 2009 and one in Division 4 2020.

== Merger history ==
Walkerville amalgamated with the North Adelaide Reserves Football Club prior to the 1979 season. North Adelaide Reserves was an independent suburban club and was not the reserves team of the North Adelaide Football Club. The club had previously been known as Thompson Memorial Football Club and later Thompson Football Club.

=== Thompson Memorial / North Adelaide Reserves ===
The club's origins were associated with the Congregational church community in North Adelaide. It was originally known as the Stanley Football Club, which was associated with the Thompson Memorial Congregational Church at Gilberton. In 1912, Stanley Football Club held its annual dinner at Thompson Memorial Church after completing an undefeated season and winning its third consecutive premiership. The Stanley name remained in use in 1915, while the Thompson Memorial name was in use by 1918.

Thompson Memorial competed for many years in church football before moving between metropolitan competitions during the Second World War. In 1941 the club temporarily combined with Spicer and All Souls in the United Church Football Association. By 1943 Thompson Memorial was competing independently in the Adelaide and Suburban Football Association and won the Blue Division premiership, defeating Kilkenny 11.10 to 11.9 in the grand final.

For the 1946 season Thompson Memorial transferred to the North Adelaide District Football Association (NADFA). The club became one of the stronger members of the competition during the following two decades. A 1947 team photograph describes Thompson Memorial as having completed that season undefeated, while the State Library of South Australia holds a photograph of the Thompson Football Club A2 premiership team of 1966.

At the end of 1968 the NADFA merged with the East Torrens Football Association to form the Norwood-North Football Association, of which Thompson became a member. The club subsequently adopted the name North Adelaide Reserves Football Club. Despite the name, it remained independent of the SANFL North Adelaide Football Club.

Following the collapse of the Norwood–North Football Association after the 1977 season, North Adelaide Reserves competed in the Adelaide and Suburban Football Association in 1978. The club won the A Grade premiership that season, defeating Adelaide Lutheran 12.11 to 4.9 in the grand final, along with winning the reserves premiership.

North Adelaide Reserves proposed an amalgamation with Walkerville during 1978, with the merger completed before the 1979 season. The combined club initially applied to join the South Australian Football Association, but the application was rejected and Walkerville instead competed in A3 of the South Australian Amateur Football League in 1979. The club subsequently entered the South Australian Football Association in 1980.

==== Premierships ====
Competition	Grade	Premiership years
United Church Football Association	Senior	1910, 1911, 1912
Adelaide and Suburban Football Association	Blue Division	1943
North Adelaide District Football Association	A1	1950, 1951, 1952, 1955, 1958, 1964
North Adelaide District Football Association	A2	1966
Adelaide and Suburban Football Association	A Grade	1978

The Stanley Football Club, predecessor of Thompson Memorial, won three consecutive premierships from 1910 to 1912. The 1912 side completed the season undefeated.

Thompson Memorial won the Adelaide and Suburban Football Association Blue Division premiership in 1943, defeating Kilkenny 11.10 to 11.9 in the grand final.

During its period in the North Adelaide District Football Association, Thompson became one of the competition's stronger clubs. The State Library of South Australia also holds a photograph of the club's 1966 A2 premiership team.

In its final season before amalgamating with Walkerville, North Adelaide Reserves won the 1978 Adelaide and Suburban Football Association A Grade premiership, defeating Adelaide Lutheran 12.11 to 4.9 in the grand final.

== Guernsey ==
The Walkerville Cats Senior Guernsey consists of white and navy blue horizontal stripes, similar to the Geelong Cats. The Juniors Guernsey are both the vertical hoops and a Baby Blue guernsey with a white sash and the junior logo in the middle.

== Home Grounds ==
- 1901-1910 - Robe Terrace, Medindie (Opposite the Buckingham Arms Hotel)
- 1911-1977 - 'Pockers Paddock', Smith Street, Walkerville
- 1978 - Park 11 (Graduates Oval), North Adelaide
- 1979–present - Walkerville Oval, Smith Street, Walkerville
