= Advertiser Shield =

Australian rules football competition

The Advertiser Shield, also known as the Junior Union Football Championship, was an annual Australian rules football competition in South Australia held between representative teams from the metropolitan leagues that were members of the SA Junior National Football Union from 1932. The Shield was named after and sponsored by The Advertiser.

== Advertiser Shield results ==
Year	Champions	Runner-up	Grand Final
1932	South Adelaide District FA	East Torrens FA	SADFA 11.15 (81) d ETDFA 10.9 (69) at Adelaide Oval
1933	Adelaide and Suburban FA	United Church FA	ASFA 4.12 (36) d UCFA 5.4 (34)
1934	South Australian Junior National FA	Adelaide and Suburban FA	SAJNFA 9.14 (68) d ASFA 8.11 (59) at Adelaide Oval
1935	Adelaide and Suburban FA	North Adelaide District FA	ASFA 12.6 (78) d NADFA 7.5 (47) at Adelaide Oval
1936	East Torrens FA	Adelaide and Suburban FA	ETFA 11.13 d ASFA 5.19
1937	Adelaide and Suburban FA	United Church FA	ASFA 9.4 (58) d UCFA 6.4 (40) at Adelaide Oval
1938	North Adelaide District FA	United Church FA	NADFA 9.10 (64) d UCFA 5.5 (35) at Adelaide Oval
1939	Adelaide and Suburban FA	East Torrens FA	ASFA 11.10 (76) d ETFA 9.15 (69) at Adelaide Oval
1940	Adelaide and Suburban FA	North Adelaide District FA	ASFA 8.10 (58) d NADFA 7.8 (50) at Adelaide Oval
1941–45	not held		
1946	North Adelaide District FA	Adelaide and Suburban Districts FA	NADFA 10.4 (64) d ASDFA 9.5 (59) at Adelaide Oval
1947	West Torrens District FA	United Church FA	WTDFA 4.18 (42) d UCFA 5.9 (39) at Adelaide Oval
1948	West Torrens District FA	North Adelaide District FA	WTDFA 5.10 (40) d NADFA 3.11 (29) at Adelaide Oval
1949	West Torrens District FA	Port Adelaide and District FA	WTDFA 10.10 (70) d PADFA 5.8 (38) at Adelaide Oval
1950	West Torrens District FA	United Church FA	WTDFA 5.19 (49) d UCFA 7.6 (48) at Adelaide Oval
1951	Sturt District FA	West Torrens District FA	SDFA 7.10 (52) d WTDFA 5.9 (39)
1952	East Torrens FA	West Torrens District FA	ETFA 9.15 (69) d WTDFA 4.7 (31)
1953	East Torrens FA	North Adelaide District FA	ETFA 13.8 (86) d NADFA 5.7 (37) at Adelaide Oval
1954	East Torrens FA	North Adelaide District FA	ETFA 9.16 (70) d NADFA 8.7 (55) at Adelaide Oval
1955			UCFA v ETFA
1956	North Adelaide District FA		
1957	North Adelaide District FA		
1958	North Adelaide District FA	East Torrens FA	NADFA 7.20 (62) d ETFA 7.14 (56)
1959	North Adelaide District FA		
1960	North Adelaide District FA		
1961	North Adelaide District FA	United Church FA	NADFA 11.15 (81) d UCFA 5.10 (40)

== Competing leagues and associations ==
The following is a list of known competitors in the Advertiser Shield:

Name	Known Years	Other Names	References
Adelaide and Suburban FA	1932–40, 1946-47	South Adelaide District FA (1932)	
Catholic Young Men's Society (CYMS) FA	1947-54		
East Torrens FA	1932, 1934–40, 1946–55, 1958		
North Adelaide District FA	1932–40, 1946-61		
Port Adelaide and District FA	1932, 1935–40, 1947, 1949, 1951		
Rechabite FA	1933		
Seaside United Church FA	1940		
South Australian Junior National FA	1933-34		
Sturt District FA	1946–47, 1949–52, 1954		
United Church FA	1932–40, 1946–47, 1950–52, 1954–55, 1961		
West Torrens District FA	1947-54		
Young Men's Christian Association (YMCA) FA	1932		
