= Eynesbury =

Eynesbury may refer to:

- Eynesbury, Cambridgeshire, a settlement in England
- Eynesbury, Victoria, a locality in Australia
- Eynesbury Senior College, a specialist Years 10, 11 and 12 college in Adelaide, South Australia
