= 1924 SAAFL season =

Sport History

1924 premiership season
- Teams: 8
- Premiers: Semaphore Central
- Minor premiers: Semaphore Central
- Wooden spooners: Y.M.C.A.
- Best and fairest: Arnold Smith (Teachers College)
- Leading goalkicker: Arthur Cowell (Semaphore Central) 57 goals

The 1924 SAAFL season was the 10th season of the South Australian Amateur Football League (SAAFL).

Kenilworth were granted a provisional affiliation, pending payment of its 1915 debt. Alberton Oval had become available for amateur matches when the Port Adelaide Council refused to give the South Australian Football League a five-year lease, it was then used regularly as Semaphore Central's home ground until 1930 when Largs Reserve became available. Teachers Training College played its matches at Hindmarsh and Kensington Ovals.

Following previous recommendations, players wore numbers on their guernseys.

A Representative match was proposed and accepted to the Barossa and Light Football Association to be played on 9th June. This match was abandoned over a disagreement over gate sharing.

== Results ==
=== Round 1 ===
	Round 1
Saturday, 3 May	Y.M.C.A. 8.4	def. by	Semaphore Centrals 17.17	Y.M.C.A. Grounds, Frome Road
Saturday, 3 May	University 10.16	def.	Dulwich 5.2	University Oval
Saturday, 3 May	Goodwood 6.15	def.	Kingswood 7.8	Goodwood Oval
Saturday, 3 May	Teachers Training College 10.15	def.	Kenilworth 10.10	{{{venue}}}

== Ladder ==
Pos	Team	Pld	W	L	D	Pts
1	Semaphore Central	14	14	0	0	28
2	Teachers Training College	14	11	3	0	22
3	University	14	10	4	0	20
4	Kenilworth	14	9	5	0	18
5	Kingswood	14	4	10	0	8
6	Goodwood	14	3	11	0	6
7	Dulwich	14	3	11	0	6
8	Y.M.C.A	14	2	12	0	4

== Finals ==
=== Semi Finals ===
	Semi-finals
Saturday, 6 September	Semaphore Central 9.10	def.	University 8.12	Alberton Oval
Saturday, 6 September	Teachers Training College 10.13	def.	Kenilworth 5.9	Thebarton Oval

=== Final ===
	Final
Saturday, 13 September	Semaphore Central 6.10	def.	Teachers Training College 5.9	Norwood Oval
