= 1930 SAAFL season =

1930 premiership season
- Date: 3 May - 13 September
- Premiers: A1: Kenilworth; A2: St. Peters OC
- Minor premiers: A1: Kenilworth; A2: Henley and Grange
- Wooden spooners: A1: Kingswood; A2: S.A. Railways Institute
- Best and fairest: A1 (Hone Medal): Rex Walter (Teachers Training College); A2: Charles Remnant (Henley & Grange)
- Leading goalkicker: A1: C.G. Rosenthal (Kenilworth) 57 goals A2: Jack Flood (St. Peter's O.C.) 60 goals

The 1930 SAAFL season was the 16th season of the South Australian Amateur Football League (SAAFL).

The 1930 season commenced on 3 May and concluded on 13 September.

S.A. Railways entered the competition, their home ground at Railways Oval (Park 25). Mount Barker were also admitted into the Amateur League, playing at Dunn Park. As South Adelaide Ramblers did not re-affiliate, only Henley & Grange were demoted to A2. Kingswood and Teachers Training College were promoted to A1 along with Mount Barker to form an even eight-team competition. Railways were admitted to A2 making that a seven-team competition. Semaphore Central played its matches at Largs Reserve.

== A1 ==
University A, Semaphore Central, Kenilworth, Underdale, St. Augustine, Teachers' College, Kingswood, Mount Barker

Pos	Team	Pld	W	L	D	PF	PA	Pts
1	Kenilworth	14	11	3	0	1361	830	22
2	University	14	10	4	0	1317	975	20
3	Semaphore Central	14	10	4	0	1032	838	20
4	Teachers Training College	14	9	4	1	1319	1007	19
5	Underdale United	14	9	4	1	1222	991	19
6	St. Augustine	14	3	11	0	682	1114	6
7	Mount Barker	14	2	12	0	825	1414	4
8	Kingswood	14	1	13	0	835	1322	2

=== Finals ===
==== Semi Finals ====
	Semi-finals
Saturday, 30 August	Kenilworth 18.15	def.	Semaphore Central 11.7	Norwood Oval
Saturday, 30 August	University 16.15	def.	Teachers Training College 14.14	Prince Alfred College Oval

==== Final ====
Final
Saturday, 6 September	Kenilworth	def.	University	Glenelg Oval
12.15	Q1; Q2; Q3; Final	12.13	Umpires: D. Busbridge
Gould 3, Ash 3, J. Smith 2, Main, W. Smith, Wundersitz, Dunn	Goals	Finlayson 5, Abbott 2, Sangster, Colebatch, Hann, Maitland, McPherson
Brunt, Meffert, Palmer, Ash, Wundersitz, W. Smith, R. Spencer	Best	Sangster, Habib, McMichael, Elix, McPherson, Abbot

== A2 ==
Henley and Grange, Prince Alfred Old Collegians, St. Peters Old Collegians, Scotch Old Collegians, University B, Y.M.C.A., Railways Institute.

Pos	Team	Pld	W	L	D	PF	PA	Pts
1	Henley and Grange	12	11	1	0	1186	641	22
2	Saint Peters Old Collegians	12	10	2	0	1012	661	20
3	Prince Alfred Old Collegians	12	8	4	0	731	697	16
4	Y.M.C.A	12	5	7	0	650	778	10
5	Scotch Old Collegians	12	4	8	0	496	600	8
6	University B	12	3	9	0	448	970	6
7	S.A. Railways Institute	12	1	11	0			2

=== Finals ===
==== Semi Finals ====
	Semi-finals
Saturday, 30 August	Henley and Grange 8.10	def.	Prince Alfred O.C. 7.8	Jubilee Oval
Saturday, 30 August	St. Peters O.C. 8.13	def.	Y.M.C.A. 5.15	Kenilworth Ground

==== Final ====
	Final
Saturday, 6 September	Henley and Grange 13.19	def. by	St. Peters O.C. 16.12	University Oval

==== Challenge Final ====
Final
Saturday, 13 September	Henley and Grange	def. by	St. Peters O.C.	Norwood Oval
6.8	Q1; Q2; Q3; Final	7.14	Umpires: J.H. Parkinson

== Representative ==
=== vs Metropolitan Amateur Football Association ===
SAAFL
B:	K.D. Inman (Semaphore Central)	Nettle (Teachers' College)	C.V. Thompson (Mount Barker)
HB:	Bridglands (St. Peter's O.C.)	R.D.S. Walter (Teachers' College)	Colley (St. Augustine)
C:	Brunt (Kenilworth)	Fahy (Underdale)	Jacka (Henley & Grange)
HF:	J.W. Flood (St. Peter's O.C.)	Hack (v.c.) (Teachers' College)	Harris (Henley & Grange)
F:	W. Smith (Kenilworth)	Downs (Teachers' College)	Hooper (Semaphore Central)
Foll:	Sangster (capt.) (University)	Venning (Railways' Institute)	A.A. McLeod (Scotch O.C.)
Res:	Halliday (Semaphore Central)	K.W. Packham (St. Augustine)	Rosenthal (Kenilworth)
Coach:	C. Keal		
Emg:	Res4: Evans (Prince Alfred O.C)		

Monday 9 June	S.A.A.F.L	def.	M.A.F.A.	Kensington Oval
5.6; 11.14; 15.19; 22.24 (156)	Q1; Q2; Q3; Final	3.2; 4.4; 8.7; 14.9 (93)
Downs 8, Flood 7, McLeod 3, Sangster, Hooper, Thompson, Harris	Goals	Barnett 4, Vickers 4, Chandler 2, Whiting 2, Mogg, Seabrook

=== vs Port Pirie Football Association ===
SAAFL
B:	Waldeck (Prince Alfred O.C.)	Stephenson (Kenilworth)	E.J. Male
HB:	Bridgeland (St. Peter's O.C.)	Walter (Teachers' College)	Colley (St. Augustine)
C:	Evans (Prince Alfred O.C.)	Brunt (Kenilworth)	Beatty (Kenilworth)
HF:	K.W. Packham	Hack (capt.) (Teachers' College)	Harris (Henley & Grange)
F:	W. Smith (Kenilworth)	Rosenthal (Kenilworth)	Halliday (Semaphore Central)
Foll:	Boyle (Y.M.C.A.)	Venning (Railways' Institute)	A.A. McLeod (Scotch O.C.)
Res:	Robertson (Scotch O.C.)		
Coach:	C.C. Chambers		

Monday 28 June	Port Pirie Association	def.	S.A.A.F.L	Memorial Oval, Port Pirie
4.3; 8.8; 14.12; 20.15 (135)	Q1; Q2; Q3; Final	1.3; 3.5; 5.8; 5.10 (70)	Umpires: L.P. Sandery
Boundy 8, Head 3, Patterson 3, Waters 2, Easson 2, Pritchard, Belcher	Goals	Rosenthal 4, Kinnear
Laube, Easson, Howard, Head, Ryan, Phillips, Yandell, Finn, WIllis	Best	Brunt, Hack, Rosenthal, Walter, Boyle, Venning, Evans, Harris

=== vs Combined Universities (Adelaide and Melbourne) ===
SAAFL
B:	Halliday	Tughy	Robertson
HB:	Waldeck	Walter	Colley
C:	Starr	Brunt	Evans
HF:	Remnant	Hack	Rosenthal
F:	Reynolds	Downs	McLeod
Foll:	Winnall	Boyle	W. Smith

Combined Universities
B:	Richards	Taylor	Baudinet
HB:	McBain	Sangster	Scharp
C:	Jens	MacFarlane	Wilson
HF:	Whitehead	McGregor	McMichael
F:	Matthews	La Fontaine	Finlayson
Foll:	Standish	Officer	Abbott

Wednesday, 20 August (3:00 pm)	S.A.A.F.L	def. by	Combined Universities	Prince Alfred College
4.2; 5.4; 9.8; 10.12 (72)	Q1; Q2; Q3; Final	5; 11.4; 12.7; 17.9 (111)
Downes 4, Remnant 2, Smith 2, Reynells, Walter	Goals	La Fontaine 10, Schulz 3, McGregor 3, Abbott
Evans, Starr, Brunt, Walter, Remnant	Best	La Fontaine, Officer, Taylor, Abbott, McGregor
