= 1933 SAAFL season =

1933 premiership season
- Date: 30 April - 16 September
- Premiers: A1: Underdale; A2: Kensington
- Minor premiers: A1: Underdale; A2: Flinders Park
- Wooden spooners: A1: St. Augustine; A2: Adelaide High O.S.
- Best and fairest: A1 (Hone Medal): Bill Walker (Kenilworth); A2 (Chambers Medal): W.J. Bentley (Teachers' Training College)
- Leading goalkicker: A1: Bill Hann (University) 66 goals A2: Gordon Sawley (Kensington) 139 goals

The 1933 SAAFL season was the 19th season of the South Australian Amateur Football League (SAAFL).

The season commenced on 29 April and concluded on 16 September.

An Australian Amateur Football Council was formed after an amateur sports club conference was held in Melbourne by the South Australian, Victorian, Western Australian and Tasmanian amateur football leagues. This would help deal with matters concerning the amateur status of footballers, the control of interstate matches, affiliation of junior leagues and details in regards to the interpretation of local rules and attitude to other bodies.

The S.A. Junior Amateur Football League, which is the S.A.A.F.L.'s junior body, was disbanded. This was after having received resignations at the annual meeting from Semaphore Central Juniors, Prince Alfred O.C., St. Peter's O.C., and King's O.C. The Junior Amateur League was intending to still operate with only four teams. Those teams being Kenilworth, Otiose, Goodwood, and Railways Institute.

University had amalgamated their B and C teams, to play in the Adelaide Students' Football Association as University B. University were joined by King's Old Collegians, Prince Alfred Old Collegians B and St. Peter's Old Collegians B. Colonel Light Gardens A and B, and Goodwood B both left to the new South Australian National Junior Football Association. Kingswood had folded at the end of 1932.

Semaphore Central Juniors renamed Exeter and joined the SAAFL proper.

The Amateur League Umpires' Association was formed.

The constitution was revised by a committee under chairman Jack Massey, which saw the introduction of life memberships. Nominated for life memberships were H.V. Millard (Secretary since 1922), Professor H. Darnley Naylor (President 1915-1926), Dr. F.S. Hone (President since 1927) and A.G. Donnell (Semaphore Central and state player). A sub-committee of Masset, F.L. Heritage (Umpires and Permit Committee) and C.G. Tideman was appointed to consider the nominations. They recommended the following:

1. that life memberships not be conferred on current office holders;
2. that life memberships be conferred only on officers or delegates of the Amateur League or others who have rendered outstanding service;
3. that only one life member be appointed at present, that person to be Darnley Naylor;
4. that players' long service certificates be not proceeded with at the moment - it was a matter for the clubs to decide and their advice was sought.

The League introduced a new rule so that the umpires can order a player off of the field if they commit a breach of the rules. Then umpire is to then submit a report of this to the league.

At the end of the season, Flinders Park were suspended by the Amateur Football League. This was due to, in the A2 Challenge Match, spectators invading the playing field and several fights occurring. This had been reported and on Thursday, 21 September 1933, the tribunal determined, in the interests of amateur football, to expel Flinders Park from the league. Flinders Park to play in the United Church Football Association from the 1934 season.

== A1 ==
University, Underdale United, Semaphore Central, Alberton Church United, Goodwood, St. Peter's Old Collegians, St. Augustine's, Kenilworth

=== Ladder ===
Pos	Team	Pld	W	L	D	PF	PA	PP	Pts
1	Underdale United	14	13	1	0	1464	1006		26
2	University	14	9	4	1	1396	1054		19
3	St. Peters Old Collegians	14	7	6	1	1121	1143	49.5	15
4	Kenilworth	14	7	6	1	1043	1107	48.5	15
5	Goodwood	14	7	7	0	1122	1244		14
6	Alberton Church United	14	5	8	1	965	1026		11
7	Semaphore Central	14	5	9	0	1057	1186		10
8	St. Augustine	14	1	13	0	1096	1480		2

=== Semi Finals ===
	Semi-finals
Saturday, 19 August	Underdale 13.13	def.	St. Peter's O.C. 10.14	University Oval
Saturday, 26 August	University 19.15	def.	Kenilworth 10.17	St. Peter's College Oval

=== Final ===
	Final
Saturday, 2 September	Underdale 7.7	def. by	University 10.9	Prince Alfred College Oval

=== Challenge Final ===
Sir George Murray Shield
Saturday, 9 September	Underdale	drew with	University	Prince Alfred College
9.15 (69)	Q1; Q2; Q3; Final	10.9 (69)	Umpires: Central: D. Busbridge. Boundary: G.K. Haskard, K. Gower

=== Challenge Final Replay ===
Sir George Murray Shield Replay
Saturday, 16 September	Underdale	def.	University	Thebarton Oval (crowd: 2000)
3.6 (24); 3.7 (25); 6.15 (51); 6.15 (51)	Q1; Q2; Q3; Final	0.0 (0); 3.3 (21); 3.6 (24); 6.10 (46)	Umpires: Field: D. Busbridge; Boundary: K.W. Packham, W. Minear
J. Wilson 3, Spain 2, Baird	Goals	Thompson 3, Day, James
Ryan, Hepworth, Burnett, J. Wilson, Kearns	Best	Larkin, McBain, Burnard, Thompson, McFarlane, Baudinet

== A2 ==
Prince Alfred Old Collegians, Henley and Grange, Teachers' College, Scotch Old Collegians, Y.M.C.A., Exeter, Flinders Park, Adelaide High Old Scholars, Kensington.

Pos	Team	Pld	W	L	D	PF	PA	Pts
1	Flinders Park	16	14	2	0	2052	828	28
2	Kensington	16	14	2	0	2040	958	28
3	Exeter	16	12	4	0	1412	998	24
4	Prince Alfred Old Collegians	16	11	5	0	1719	963	22
5	Henley and Grange	16	7	9	0	1143	1187	14
6	Scotch Old Collegians	16	7	9	0	1165	1438	14
7	Y.M.C.A	16	4	12	0	826	1782	8
8	Teachers Training College	16	3	13	0	1075	1770	6
9	Adelaide High O.S.	16	0	16	0	586	2076	0

=== Semi Finals ===
	Semi-finals
Saturday, 2 September	Flinders Park 22.21	def.	Exeter 6.10	University Oval
Saturday, 2 September	Kensington 10.20	def.	Prince Alfred O.C. 8.5	Rostrevor College

=== Final ===
	Final
Saturday, 9 September	Flinders Park 7.6	def. by	Kensington 14.15	Jubilee Oval
Umpire: F.J. Monten

=== Challenge Final ===
Mark Mitchell Shield
Saturday, 16 September	Flinders Park	def. by	Kensington	Unley Oval
4.5; 4.5; 5.12; 5.12 (42)	Q1; Q2; Q3; Final	3.0; 7.1; 7.11; 9.16 (70)	Umpires: Central: K. Gower; Boundary: W. Abbott, J. Hounslow
Howitt, Norman, Bradbrook, Walton, Trevan	Goals	G. Sawley 4, Bowen, Bertram, Hearn, Jones, Ramson
Ward, Prider, Walton, Dedman, C. Trevan, Dunlop	Best	Lyons, Smithies, Bertram, G. Sawley, A. Sawley
Flinders Park were reported due to the behaviour of their supporters.

== Representatives ==
=== vs Victorian Amateur Football Association ===
SAAFL
B:	Colley (St. Augustine's)	Baudinet (University)	Burnett (Underdale)
HB:	Bridgland (St. Peter's O.C.) capt.	McFarlane (University)	Burnard (University)
C:	Jones (Kensington)	Newland (St. Peter's O.C.)	Brunt (Kenilworth)
HF:	Bentley (Teachers' College)	Day (University)	Bradshaw (Prince Alfred O.C.)
F:	Conroy (Underdale)	Morton (St. Augustine's)	Le Messurier (St. Peter's O.C.)
Foll:	McGorm (Alberton Church United)	Dunlop (Flinders Park)	Walker (Kenilworth)
Res:	Tunbridge (Semaphore Central)	White (University)	
Coach:	H.V. Millard (secretary of Amateur League)		

Monday, 5 June (2:45pm)	V.A.F.A	def.	S.A.A.F.L.	Richmond Cricket Ground (crowd: 5000)
7.4 (46); 13.7 (85); 18.9 (117); 21.14 (140)	Q1; Q2; Q3; Final	2.3 (15); 4.5 (29); 9.11 (65); 12.14 (86)	Umpires: W. Riley; Marks Cup: La Fontaine
La Fontaine 14, Churchus 3, Mahlook, McGregor, Sibthorpe	Goals	Morton 4, Bradshaw 4, Day 3, Conroy
La Fontaine (BoG), Peters, McGregor, Morris, Churchus, Boyce, Davidson, Forty, Staues, Seabrook, Honey	Best	Brunt, Bradshaw, le Messurier, Day, Morton, McGorm, Bridgland, Colley, Bardinet
