= Henley Football Club =

Henley Sharks

Names
- Full name: Henley Sharks Football & Netball Club
- Nickname: Sharks
- Club song: "We are the Navy Blues"

2026 season

Club details
- Founded: 1899; 127 years ago
- Colours
- Competition: Adelaide Footy League; SANFL Juniors
- President: Dwayne Illies
- Coach: Daimon Head
- Captain: Tom Pillion
- Ground: Henley & Grange Memorial Oval

Uniforms
Home

Other information
- Official website: henleysharks.com.au

The Henley Sharks Football & Netball Club is an Australian sports club headquartered in Henley Beach, South Australia. Established in 1899, Henley's main sports are Australian rules football and netball. The football team currently plays in the Adelaide Footy League. The Henley 'Sharks' field 4 senior men's teams in the league, Division 2, Division 2 Reserves. The sharks in recent years have also established women's teams competing in Division 1, Division 1 Reserves along with the many many junior teams in the SANFL in grades ranging from Under 8's through to Under 18's boys & girls.

The Henley FC has been affiliated with several different leagues over their history including the SAAFL, West Torrens District Football Association, Adelaide & Suburban Football League and the South Australian Football Association (SAFA). The Henley Sharks have also been known as Grange, Henley Beach, Henley & Grange, Henley Two Blues, Henley Eagles, Henley District & Old Scholars and Henley Greek.

== History ==
The "Henley Football Club" was formed in 1899 and played its 1st season in a competition known as the "Port Adelaide Football Association". Before 1920 the club played at an oval of the Henley area.

In 1906 Henley affiliated to "Suburban United Football Association" and one year later it won the premiership at the Unley Oval against St. Bartholomew, being the first official championship won by the club.

Troops returning from World War I established the "Grange Football Club", playing in several competitions of South Australia. Before the 1920 season Grange FC merged with Henley to join forces and improve the level for the competition. The club was renamed "Henley & Grange Football Club" and played its home games at Grange Oval, which would be the venue for the next 27 years.

The team played the Grand Final that season but it was defeated by University. In 1934, Henley & Grange won its first Premiership in the Division 2.

Australian Football League (AFL) players who represented Henley as juniors include Warren Tredrea (Port Adelaide), Sam Phillipou (Western Bulldogs), Matthew Pavlich (Fremantle), Ken McGregor (Adelaide), Paul Bulluss (Richmond) and Brodie Smith (Adelaide).

== A-Grade Premierships ==
- South Australian Amateur Football League (SAAFL)
  - Division 1 (1): 2010
  - Division 2 (1): 2004 (Undefeated)

== Merger history ==
Henley Football Club was formed in 1994 as the Henley Greek Football Club, a merger of the Henley Districts and Old Scholars Football Club and the Greek Football Club, who had broken away from an existing merger with the Camden Football Club.

=== Henley District and Old Scholars ===
The Henley District and Old Scholars Football Club was formed in 1978 from a merger of the Henley Football Club and the Henley High Old Scholars Football Club. Initially participating in the South Australian Amateur Football League (SAAFL), Henley District and Old Scholars shifted to the South Australian Football Association (SAFA) in 1982, where it remained until it merged with the remnants of the Greek Football Club to form the Henley Greek Football Club and returning to the SAAFL.

A-Grade Premierships

- South Australian Football Association A1 (2)
  - 1992
  - 1993
- South Australian Football Association A2 (1)
  - 1983

==== Henley High Old Scholars ====
The Henley High Old Scholars Football Club was formed in 1974 and entered the South Australian Amateur Football League (SAAFL). The club lasted for four seasons before merging with Henley to form the Henley District and Old Scholars Football Club in 1978.

A-Grade Premierships

- South Australian Amateur Football League A5 (1)
  - 1974

=== Greek ===
The Greek Football Club was established as the Greek Orthodox Football Club participating in the United Church Football Association before it shifted to the South Australian Amateur Football League (SAAFL) in 1969. In 1970 the club was renamed the Greek Football Club and continued in the SAAFL until it entered a merger in 1987 with the Camden Football Club to form the Greek Camden Football Club. This partnership would last until 1994 when the partnership split with the Camden part merging with Plympton High Old Scholars to form the PHOS Camden Football Club, and the Greek component merging with Henley District and Old Scholars to form the Henley Greek Football Club.

A-Grade Premierships

- South Australian Amateur Football League A1 (1)
  - 1985
- South Australian Amateur Football League A2 (1)
  - 1982

=== Henley (1958–1977) ===
Henley Football Club was formed in 1958 as the Henley and Grange Football Club, a merger of the Henley Football Club and the Grange Football Club. In 1970 the club was renamed the Henley Football Club.

A-Grade Premierships

- South Australian Amateur Football League A2 (2)
  - 1965
  - 1973

==== Henley (1947–1958) ====
Henley Football Club was formed as the Henley Beach Football Club, known as the "Two Blues" in 1947 and entered the West Torrens District Football Association. In 1953 Henley shifted to the South Australian Amateur Football League (SAAFL) where it remained until it merged with the Grange Football Club in 1958 to form the Henley and Grange Football Club.

A-Grade Premierships

- West Torrens District Football Association Blue Division (3)
  - 1950
  - 1951 Undefeated
  - 1952 Undefeated
- South Australian Amateur Football League A2 (1)
  - 1954
- South Australian Amateur Football League A3 (1)
  - 1953 Undefeated

==== Grange (1920–1958) ====
Grange Football Club was formed as the Henley and Grange Football Club in 1920 as a merger of the Henley Beach Football Club and the Grange Football Club, initially participating in the South Australian Amateur Football League (SAAFL). In 1923 the club went into recess before reviving and joining the West Torrens Football Association. Henley and Grange returned to the SAAFL in 1927, and in 1937 was renamed the Grange Football Club and shifted to the Adelaide and Suburban Football Association. In 1947, Grange joined the reformed West Torrens District Football Association, returning to the SAAFL in 1955. In 1958 Grange merged with Henley and revived the Henley and Grange name.

A-Grade Premierships

- South Australian Amateur Football League A2 (1)
  - 1934
- West Torrens District Football Association Gold Division
  - 1948

===== Henley Beach (-1920) =====
The Henley Beach Football Club merged with the Grange Football Club in 1920 to form the Henley and Grange Football Club.

A-Grade Premierships

- Suburban United Football Association (1)
  - 1907
- Adelaide Junior Football Association (1)
  - 1913

===== Grange (-1920) =====
The Grange Football Club merged with the Henley Beach Football Club in 1920 to form the Henley & Grange Football Club.
