= 1937 SAAFL season =

1937 premiership season
- Date: 1 May - 18 September
- Premiers: A1: West Adelaide United; A2: Alberton Church United
- Minor premiers: A1: West Adelaide United; A2: Alberton Church United
- Wooden spooners: A1: Rechabites; A2: Combined Banks
- Best and fairest: A1 (Hone Medal): J.C. Stephens (Prince Alfred O.C.); R.T. Clark (St. Peter's O.C.) 31 votes A2 (Chambers Medal): I.H. Hooper (Pulteney O.S.); A.M.D. James (Banks) 36 votes
- Leading goalkicker: A1: J. Johnson (Semaphore Central) 105 goals A2: Isaac (Y.M.C.A.) 95 goals

The 1937 SAAFL season was the 23rd season of the South Australian Amateur Football League (SAAFL).

The season commenced on 1 May and concluded on 18 September.

Three clubs left the Amateur League, Goodwood did not reform, Henley & Grange who reverted to Grange left to play in the Adelaide & Suburban, and Holden's disbanded. Goodwood and Henley & Grange left A1, their places taken by the A2 Grand Finalists of 1936, Walkerville and Eastwood Rechabites. Three new clubs joined and entered A2, S.A. Railways Institute and Colonel Light Gardens who both returned from Adelaide & Suburban, and newly-formed Combined Banks. Broadview and Payneham also applied for affiliation, but were unsuccessful.

The Best and Fairest were won by two players in both A1 (Hone Medal) and A2 (Chambers Medal)

Due to "a brawl" among the spectators, between 40 and 50 people, the Amateur League held a special meeting on the 28 September 1937. By an overwhelming majority, the recommendation of the league tribunal that "in the interests of the league and football generally" the West Adelaide United Club would need to forfeit its membership. This did not affect their premiership win. The president of the Amateur League (Mr. J.T. Massey) stated that "The Amateur League particularly, always places the responsibility for supporters and their behaviour upon the constituent clubs. If a club is unable to control its followers then it is considered undesirable in the Amateur League." This decision has a precedent where the Flinders Park club were disqualified for a similar incident.

== A1 ==
West Adelaide United, Semaphore Central, St. Peter's Old Collegians, University, Underdale, Kenilworth, Exeter, Walkerville, Prince Alfred Old Collegians, and Rechabite.

=== Ladder ===
Pos	Team	Pld	W	L	D	PF	PA	Pts
1	West Adelaide United	18	14	4	0	1788	1395	28
2	Semaphore Central	18	13	5	0	1846	1353	26
3	St. Peter's O.C.	18	11	6	1	1766	1435	23
4	Prince Alfred O.C.	18	10	8	0	1678	1487	20
5	University	18	10	8	0	1487	1525	20
6	Underdale	18	9	8	1	1547	1463	19
7	Kenilworth	18	7	10	1	1394	1578	15
8	Exeter	18	7	11	0	1384	1594	14
9	Walkerville	18	6	11	1	1512	1655	13
10	Eastwood Rechabites	18	1	17	0	1108	2023	2

=== Finals ===
==== Semi-Finals ====
	Semi-finals
Saturday, 4 September	West Adelaide United 10.12	def.	St. Peter's O.C. 8.14	Prospect Oval
Saturday, 4 September	Semaphore Central 15.14	def. by	Prince Alfred O.C. 16.13	Norwood Oval

==== Final ====
Sir George Murray Shield
Saturday, 11 September	West Adelaide United	def. by	Prince Alfred O.C.	Thebarton Oval
5.7 (37); 7.10 (52); 7.11 (53); 7.17 (59)	Q1; Q2; Q3; Final	2.2 (14); 6.4 (40); 6.8 (44); 9.8 (62)	Umpires: J.H. Parkinson
Nash 3, Amos 2, Curthovs 1, Kemp 1	Goals	Dawkins 6, Ward 2, Bennett

==== Challenge Final ====
Sir George Murray Shield (Challenge Final)
Saturday, 18 September	West Adelaide United	def.	Prince Alfred O.C.	Prospect Oval
0.0 (0); 5.1 (31); 6.1 (37); 10.3 (63)	Q1; Q2; Q3; Final	2.5 (17); 2.6 (18); 6.9 (45); 7.10 (52)	Umpires: J.H. Parkinson
Keane 4, Nash 2, Amos 1, Rowell, Curthoys, L. Brown	Goals	Dawkins 4, Ward, Stanford, Bennett

== A2 ==
Railways Institute, Colonel Light Gardens, Alberton Church United, Christian Brothers Old Collegians, Teachers' College, Banks, Pulteney Old Scholars, King's Old Collegians, Y.M.C.A., and Old Scotch.

=== Ladder ===
Pos	Team	Pld	W	L	D	PF	PA	Pts
1	Alberton Church United	18	16	2	0	1651	856	32
2	Old Scotch	18	14	4	0	1781	1244	28
3	S.A. Railways Institute	18	13	5	0	1989	998	26
4	Colonel Light Gardens	18	12	6	0	1626	1134	24
5	Y.M.C.A	18	11	7	0	1255	1330	22
6	Teachers College	18	9	9	0	1613	1376	18
7	King's O.C.	17	6	11	0	1188	1349	12
8	Pulteney O.S.	18	5	13	0	1354	1820	10
9	Christian Brothers O.C.	17	2	15	0	848	1693	4
10	Combined Banks	18	1	17	0	837	2340	2

=== Finals ===
==== Semi-Finals ====
	Semi-finals
Saturday, 11 September	Alberton Church United 6.15	def.	Railways Institute 6.12	Alberton Oval
Saturday, 11 September	Old Scotch 7.11	def. by	Colonel Light Gardens 11.4	Prospect Oval

==== Final ====
Saturday, 18 September	Alberton Church United	def.	Colonel Light Gardens	Alberton Oval
6.7 (43)	Q1; Q2; Q3; Final	5.3 (33)	Umpires: S.H. Oehme

== Representative ==
=== vs S.A.F.A ===
A Match was arranged between the Amateur League and the S.A. Football Association (SANFL's B Grade) at Adelaide Oval on ANZAC Day following a request from the Returned Soldiers and Sailors' Imperial League, the proceeds for a fund for disabled returned men.

SAAFL
B:	K. South (University)	P. Klienschmidt (University)	H. Hawke (Walkerville)
HB:	M. Brookman (St. Peter's O.C.)	J. Johnson (Semaphore Central)	W. Brown (West Adelaide United)
C:	A. Hayward (St. Peter's O.C.)	B. Leak (Scotch O.C.)	L. Reeves (Eastwood)
HF:	I. Hooper (Pulteney)	J. Stephens (Prince Alfred O.C.)	J. Pash (Teachers' College)
F:	B. Lee (St. Peter's O.C.) capt.	R. Keane (West Adelaide United) v.c.	A. Amos (West Adelaide United)
Foll:	J. Bellhouse (West Adelaide United)	H. Hawke (Walkerville)	P. Le Messurier (University)
Int:	C. McCormick (West Adelaide United)		

SAFA
B:	W. Moyle (South Adelaide)	J. Quick (West Torrens)	H. Kersley (West Torrens)
HB:	J. Herbert (Sturt)	D. Carlos (Glenelg)	Fenwick
C:	C. Whicker (Port Adelaide)	J. Pratt (West Adelaide)	R. Hancock (Norwood)
HF:	D. Batt (Norwood)	L. Moulton (North Adelaide)	R. Dawe (Port Adelaide)
F:	C. Martindoff (South Adelaide)	J. Ritch (Port Adelaide)	R. Cassebohm (West Adelaide)
Foll:	G. Page (Norwood) capt.	C. Aintrope (Sturt)	C. Rix (North Adelaide)
Int:	W. Pike (Glenelg)		

Wednesday, 26 April (2:45 pm)	S.A. Football Association	drew with	S.A. Amateur League	Adelaide Oval
4.3 (27); 8.8 (56); 8.22 (70); 11.12 (78)	Q1; Q2; Q3; Final	1.8 (14); 4.13 (37); 8.9 (57); 9.24 (78)	Umpires: D. Eglinton
Ritch 4, Batt 2, Martindoff 2, Aistrope, Kersley, Dawe	Goals	Keane 2, Lee 2, Pash 2, Amos, Adcock, LeMessurier

=== vs Victorian Amateur Football Association ===
SAAFL
B:	P. Klienschmidt (University)	A. Inglis (Semaphore Central)	R. MacIlwain (Scotch O.C.)
HB:	H. Tuohy (Eastwood Rechabites)	H. Jarvis (Teachers' College)	J. Gower (Exeter)
C:	R. Clark (St. Peter's O.C.)	A. Hayward (St. Peter's O.C.)	L. Reeves (Eastwood Rechabites)
HF:	J. Stephens (Prince Alfred O.C.)	D. Ward (Prince Alfred O.C.)	J. Pash (Teachers' College)
F:	P. LeMessurier (University)	A. Dawkins (Prince Alfred O.C.)	B. Lee (St. Peter's O.C.) capt.
Foll:	R. Keane (West Adelaide United) v.c.	C. Adcock (King's O.C.)	L. Juttner (West Adelaide United)
Emg:	I. Hooper (Pulteney O.C.)	Richards	Juncken

VAFA
B:	L. Mithen	R. Baker	A. Buchan
HB:	D. Burnard	I. Galbraith (University) capt.	J. Davison
C:	J. Konway	J. Evans	T. Graham
HF:	F. Scott	G. Anderson	H. Rutherford
F:	F. Higginbotham	W. Pearson (Old Scotch) v.c.	J. Lucas
Foll:	J. Atkins	J. Bray	H. Day
Emg:	R. Kline	R. Stevenson	

Saturday, 7 August	VAFA	def. by	SAAFL	St. Kilda Cricket Ground (crowd: 2000)
7.3 (45); 9.3 (57_; 13.9 (87); 14.10 (94)	Q1; Q2; Q3; Final	1.5 (11); 8.9 (57); 12.11 (83); 17.14 (116)	Umpires: Antonio
Pearson 12, Bray, Day	Goals	Dawkins 7, Ward 4, Lee 3, Adcock, Juttner, Stephens
Pearson, Rutherford, Day, Gray, Anderson, Buchanan	Best	Adcock, Tuohy, Pash, Juttner, Lee, Dawkins, Hayward
Graham (thigh muscle)	Injuries	Reeves (hip)
