= 1947 SAAFL season =

1947 premiership season
- Date: 3 May - 13 September
- Premiers: A1: Exeter; A2: Goodwood; A3: Christian Brothers' O.C.
- Minor premiers: A1: Exeter; A2: Goodwood; A3: Railways' Institute
- Wooden spooners: A1: Prince Alfred O.C. A2: University B A3: Queen's O.C.
- Best and fairest: A1 (Hone Medal): Dick Halliday (Payneham, coach and v.c.); A2 (Chambers Medal): Bill Hay (St. Peter's O.C.); A3 (McKay Medal): Ivan Hooper (Pulteney O.S.)
- Leading goalkicker: A1: Bernie Jordan (Woodville) 42 goals A2: A3:

The 1947 SAAFL season was the 29th season of the South Australian Amateur Football League (SAAFL).

The season commenced on 3 May and concluded on 13 September.

Three new clubs were admitted, the returning Christian Brothers' Old Collegians and Payneham B, and Queen's Old Collegians. This made a total of 22 teams, the League create 3 grades, A1 and A2 had 8 teams each, and A3 with 6 teams. Grade A1 - Woodville, University, Colonel Light Gardens, Semaphore Central, Exeter, Walkerville, Payneham, Prince Alfred Old Scholars. Grade A2 - Goodwood, St. Peter's Old Collegians, Railways' Institute, King's Old Collegians, University B, Kelvinator, Alberton Church United, Kenilworth. Grade A3 - Teachers' College, Pulteney Old Scholars, Old Scotch, Christian Brothers' Old Collegians, Queen's Old Collegians, Payneham B. With the addition of A3, a new shield was created, the "Darnley Naylor Shield" in memory of the late Professor H. Darnley Naylor, the first president of the League.

Teachers' College, after an extremely dominant winning 24.29 to 1.5 against Old Scotch Collegians in round 1, winning 27.16 to 3.4 against Christian Brothers' O.C. in round 2, and winning 37.25 to 3.5 against Pulteney O.S. in round 3, were promoted into A2, Railways' Institute being relegated from round 4.

== A1 ==
=== Ladder ===
Pos	Team	Pld	W	L	D	PF	PA	Pts
1	Exeter	14	12	2	0	1297	1068	24
2	University	14	11	3	0	1173	870	22
3	Woodville	14	11	3	0	1307	1006	22
4	Payneham	14	7	7	0	1233	1120	14
5	Walkerville	14	6	8	0	1233	1307	12
6	Semaphore Central	14	3	11	0	907	1159	6
7	Colonel Light Gardens	14	3	11	0	857	1156	6
8	Prince Alfred O.C.	14	3	11	0	876	1199	6

=== Finals ===
==== Semi Finals ====
	Semi-finals
Saturday, 23 August	Exeter 10.11	def. by	Woodville 14.12	Payneham Oval
Saturday, 23 August	University 9.18	def.	Payneham 6.11	Teachers' College Oval

The match between University and Payneham was awarded to Payneham, due to University having played a man who was not an amateur at the time of his registration. That player being L. Streng, University were fined 5/ for each match Streng took part in. The committee had pointed out that no protest had been entered by Payneham, nor any club that Streng played against throughout the season, and the decision was made at the discretion of the Amateur League.

==== Final ====
Saturday, 6 September	Woodville	def.	Payneham	Teachers' College Oval
7.4; 12.9; 12.11; 17.18	Q1; Q2; Q3; Final	4.2; 7.3; 14.7; 15.7	Umpires: K.O. Carter

==== Challenge Final ====
Saturday, 13 September	Exeter	def.	Woodville	Alberton Oval (crowd: 2,000)
14.14	Q1; Q2; Q3; Final	6.8	Umpires: L.R. Cooper

== A2 ==
=== Ladder ===
Pos	Team	Pld	W	L	D	PF	PA	Pts
1	Goodwood	14	9	4	1	1026	882	19
2	Kelvinator	14	9	5	0	1185	927	18
3	Alberton Church United	14	9	5	0	1058	928	18
4	St. Peter's O.C.	13	6	6	1	917	942	15
5	Kenilworth	14	5	7	2	1000	1039	12
6	King's O.C.	14	6	8	0	1068	1130	12
7	Teachers' College	13	5	8	0	900	1021	10
8	University B	14	4	10	0	922	1207	8

=== Finals ===
==== Semi Finals ====
	Semi-finals
Saturday, 23 August	Kelvinator 12.17	def.	St. Peter's O.C. 4.15	Walkerville Oval
Saturday, 30 August	Goodwood 12.14	def.	Alberton Church United 6.9	Payneham Oval

==== Final ====
Saturday, 6 September	Goodwood	def.	Kelvinator	Payneham Oval
13.8	Q1; Q2; Q3; Final	9.8	Umpires: L.R. Cooper

== A3 ==
=== Ladder ===
Pos	Team	Pld	W	L	D	PF	PA	Pts
1	Railways' Institute	15	13	2	0			26
2	Christian Brothers O.C.	15	12	3	0			24
3	Payneham B	15	8	6	1			17
4	Pulteney O.S.	15	7	7	1			15
5	Old Scotch	15	3	12	0			6
6	Queen's O.C.	15	1	14	0			2

=== Finals ===
==== Semi Finals ====
	Semi-finals
Saturday, 30 August	Railways' Institute 10.15	def.	Payneham B 7.13	Teachers' College Oval
Saturday, 30 August	Christian Brothers' O.C. 27.12	def.	Pulteney O.S. 5.4	Prince Alfred College Oval

Railways' Institute were disqualified as they played a man who was a paid umpire, I. McLeod. However as they were minor premier, Railways' still has the right of challenge. They were fined 5/ for each occasion that McLeod played.

==== Final ====
Saturday, 6 September	Christian Brothers' O.C.	def.	Payneham B	Walkerville Oval
16.13	Q1; Q2; Q3; Final	9.11	Umpires: A.K. Tucker

==== Challenge Final ====
Saturday, 13 September	Railways' Institute	def. by	Christian Brothers' O.C.	Thebarton Oval
10.13	Q1; Q2; Q3; Final	11.8

== Representative ==
=== vs VAFA ===
SAAFL
VAFA

SAAFL
B:	Carr (Semaphore Central)	Hamilton (Woodville)	Duke (Payneham)
HB:	Griffiths (Semaphore Central)	Abbott (University)	Downing (Prince Alfred O.C.)
C:	Geoff Bray (Alberton Church United)	Tregonning (University) captain	Woodward (University)
HF:	Wood (King's O.C.)	Bennetts (Walkerville)	Davies (University)
F:	Webber (Teachers' College)	Jordan (Woodville)	Hay (St. Peter's O.C.)
Foll:	Garland (Woodville)	Whelan (Kenilworth)	Halliday (Payneham) vice-captain
Emg:	Teagke (Woodville)	Russell (Exeter)	Peters (Exeter)
Emg:	Winter (King's O.C.)		

VAFA
B:
HB:
C:
HF:
F:
Foll:

Saturday, 9 August (2:45 pm)	S.A.A.F.L.	def.	V.A.F.A.	Adelaide Oval
18.16 (124)	Q1; Q2; Q3; Final	11.14 (80)	Umpires: L.R. Cooper
