= Flinders Park Football Club =

Australian rules football club

Flinders Park

Names
- Full name: Flinders Park Football Club
- Nickname: Reds

2023 season
- After finals: Premiers
- Home-and-away season: 3rd

Club details
- Founded: 100 years ago 1927 - 2027
- Colours: red gold dark blue
- Competition: Adelaide Footy League
- President: Sam Snowdon
- Coach: Josh Gould
- Ground: Flinders Park

Uniforms
Home

Other information
- Official website: fpfc.com.au

The Flinders Park Football Club is an Australian sports club, mainly known for its Australian rules football team, which competes in the Adelaide Footy League.

Other sports practised at the club are cricket, and netball.

== History ==
The club was formed in 1927 as the Flinders Park Methodist Church Football Club when a meeting was held on 15 March 1927. The team played in the United Church Football Association in the B Division and wore a brown and blue guernsey, capping off their first season in history with a premiership win. The club remained in the United Church Association for six seasons until 1933 when the club applied to join the South Australian Amateur Football League. They played for one season in the SAAFL but were evicted from the league due to poor spectator behaviour and were moved to the Adelaide & Suburban Football League, where the Reds remained until 1946 That year the club won a second senior grade premiership.

In 1947, Flinders Park shifted leagues again, this time to the West Torrens District Football Association where they won another premiership that same year and the following year, in 1948, saw some more premiership success. The club moved back to the SAAFL in 1949 and over three decades, the Reds achieved a lot of success and the 1970s saw the club win back to back A-Grade premierships in 1976 and 1977. The 1978 season saw the club moving to the newly formed South Australian Football Association (SAFA) which was then the second tier of Australian rules football in South Australia. Flinders Park competed in the SAFA for a number of years and won another A-Grade premiership that same year, in 1978, and won a back to back premiership in 1979. A third premiership was won in 1981 and a fourth in 1983. The SAFA disbanded after the 1995 season which saw Flinders Park and most of its other member clubs transfer to the SAAFL. Upon transferring, the Division 4 side won the premiership in 1996.

In 2020 Flinders Park has senior A and B grade football teams competing in Division 3 and 3 Reserves of the Adelaide Footy League, C grade at C3 level, and a Senior Colts team competing in the Under 18.5 Red division as well as senior women's football in Division 4. Junior football is offered at all levels of SANFL Juniors for boys as well as two girls teams at under 12 and under 16 level, and the club has one of the strongest junior administrations in metropolitan Adelaide.

Also part of the club are the Flinders Park Cricket Club competing in 2018/19 in the Adelaide Turf Cricket Association's A2, B2 and LO1 levels with juniors in the Western Suburbs Junior Cricket Association.

In 2015 Flinders Park established netball teams that compete in the South Australian United Church Netball Association right across the grades, and has expanded at a rapid rate from the inaugural two winter teams in 2015 to some seven senior teams for summer 2018/19 and six during winter 2019.

== Premierships ==
- Division 1 - 1976, 1977
- Division 2 - 1956
- Division 3 - 1949, 2000, 2008, 2011, 2023
- Division 4 - 1996
- Division 5 - 1968
- Division 6 - 1970, 1973, 1974
- Division 7 - 2000
- Division 1 Reserves - 1976
- Division 2 Reserves - 1962, 1972, 1973
- Division 3 Reserves - 2008, 2011, 2016, 2018, 2019
- Division 7 Reserves - 2012
- C2 - 2009, 2010
- C3 - 2011, 2017, 2018, 2019
- C6 - 2011
- Division 5 Women - 2019
- U18 - 1962, 1968, 1970, 1971, 2017, 2018
