= Franklin Street, Adelaide =

Street in Adelaide, South Australia

Franklin Street South Australia
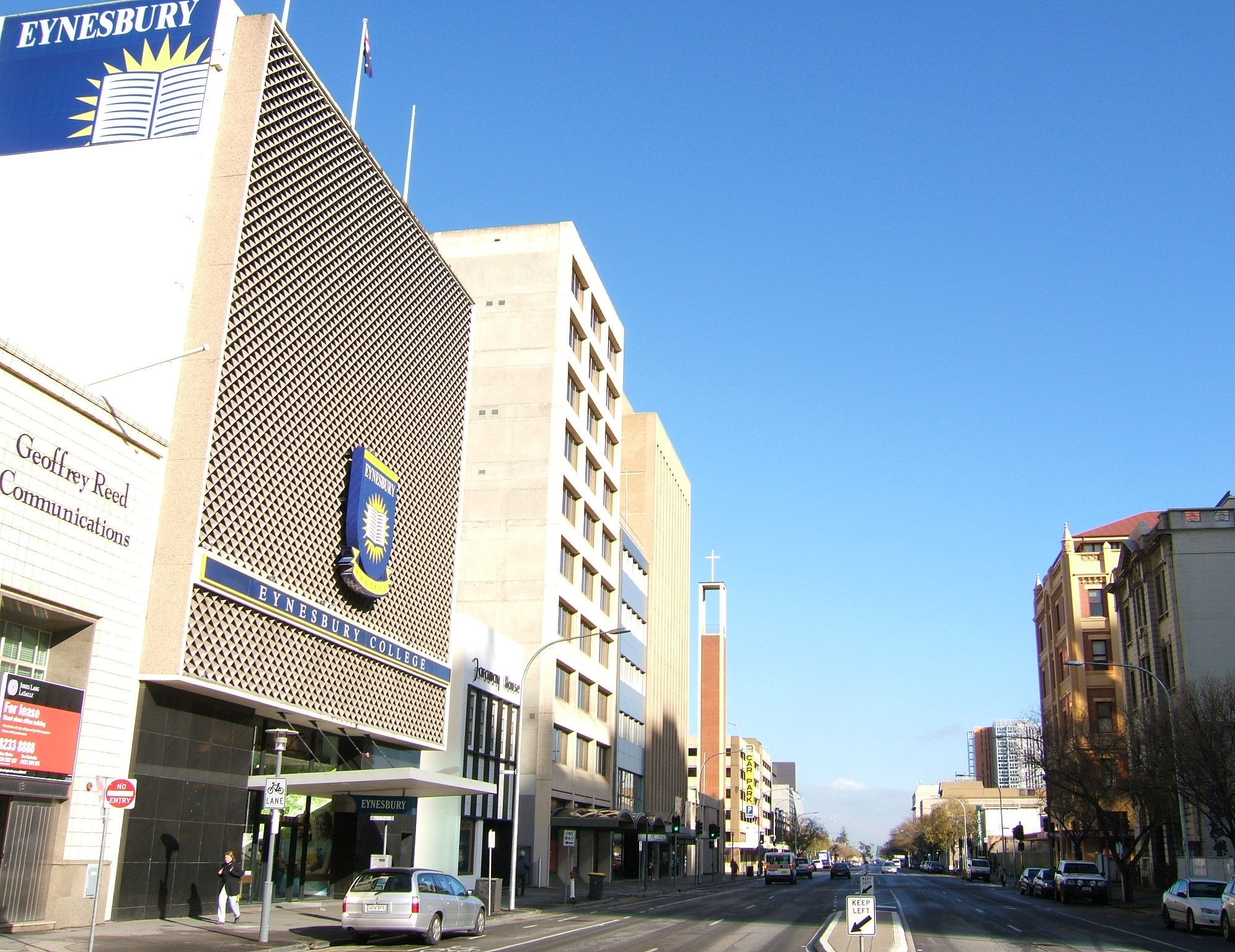
- Franklin Street, looking west from King William Street, 2010
- Coordinates: 34.927740°S 138.587740°E (West end); 34.927161°S 138.599834°E (East end)

General information
- Type: Street
- Location: Adelaide city centre
- Length: 1.1 km (0.7 mi)
- Opened: 1837

Major junctions
- West end: West Terrace; Adelaide
- Morphett Street; Victoria Square
- East end: King William Street; Adelaide

Location(s)
- LGA(s): City of Adelaide

Franklin Street is a main street in the Adelaide city centre, South Australia.

== Extent ==
Franklin Street terminates at its western end at West Terrace. The eastern end merges into the northern edge of Victoria Square and continues across King William Street as Flinders Street.

== History ==
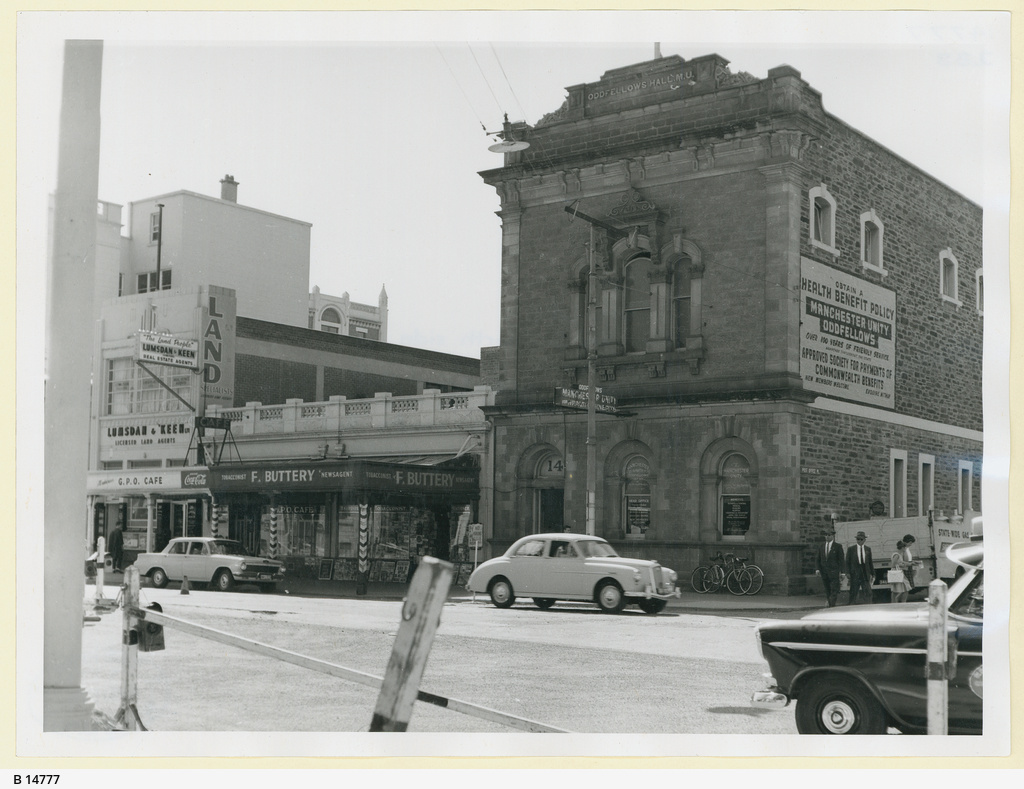
Franklin Street, north side, 1963.

The street was named on 23 May 1837 in honour of John Franklin, Arctic explorer and Governor of Van Diemen's Land (1837- 43).

Rev. James Maughan founded the Methodist New Connection in Flinders Street, which as of 1922 was the Central Mission. The Maughan Uniting Church, built in 1965, was demolished in 2016.

=== 2011 redevelopment ===
In 2011, the street commenced a mid-scale redevelopment of four major buildings:

- 50m 71–83 Franklin Street [Approved in 2014]
- 67m 42–56 Franklin Street [Approved in 2013]
- 72m City Central 8 [U/C – 2012]
- 73m 58–76 Franklin Street [U/C – 2014]

=== Tesla superchargers ===
In 2017, the first Tesla Superchargers in South Australia were installed in Franklin Street, along with generic vehicle chargers. This completed an Australian Tesla charging network that stretches as far as the Brisbane, over 2,000 km (1,200 mi) away.

== Notable buildings ==
Franklin Street is the location of the Adelaide General Post Office, Eynesbury Senior College, the Adelaide Central bus station, and various companies.

== Gallery ==
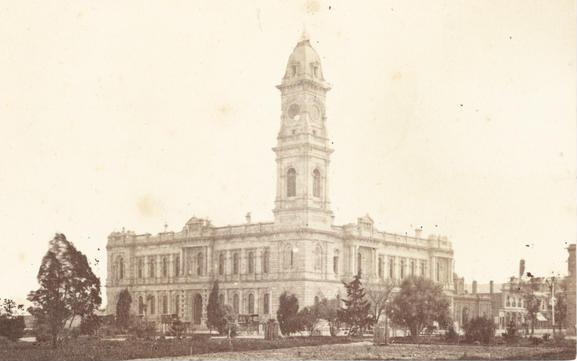
Adelaide GPO

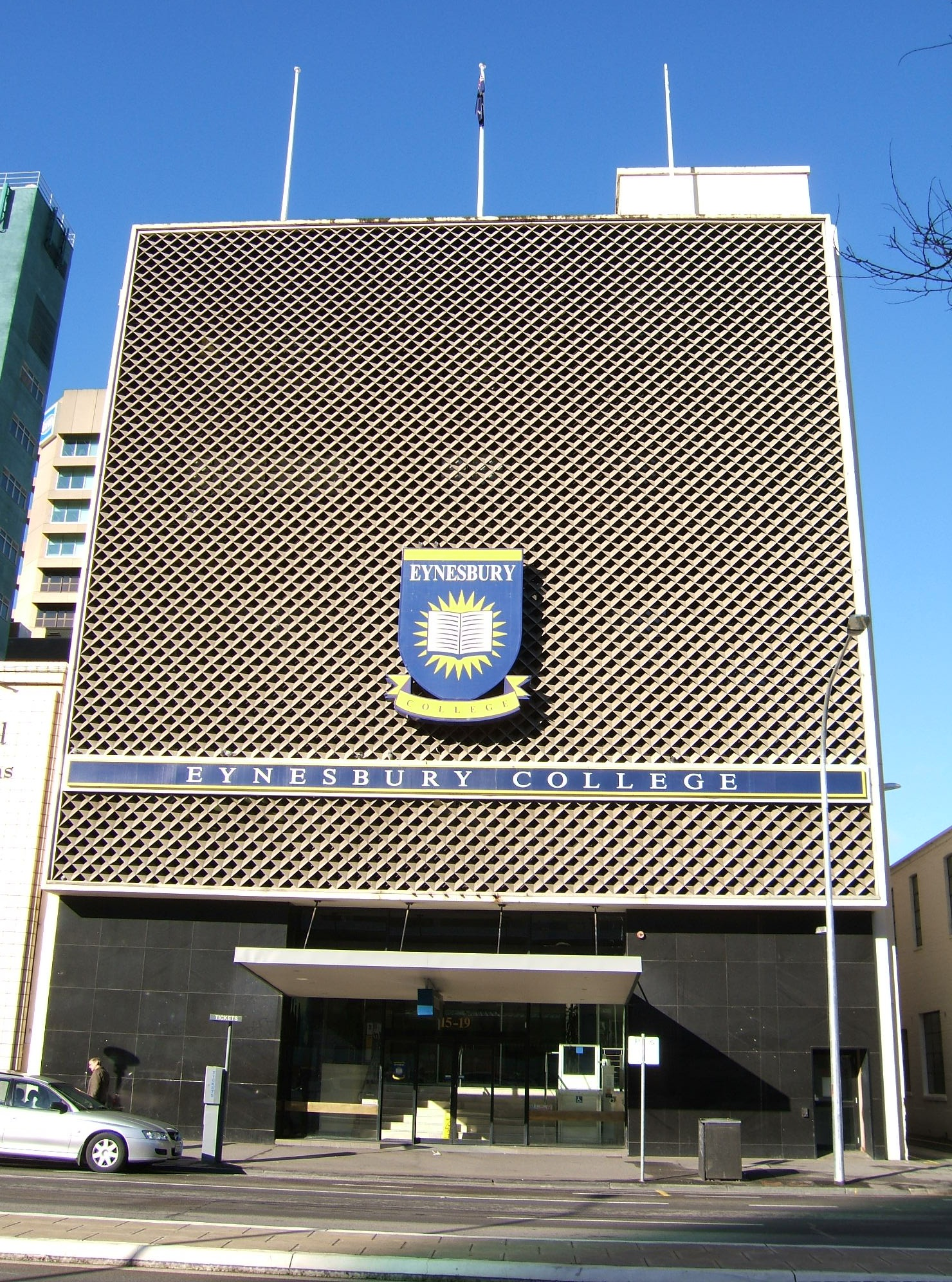
Eynesbury College

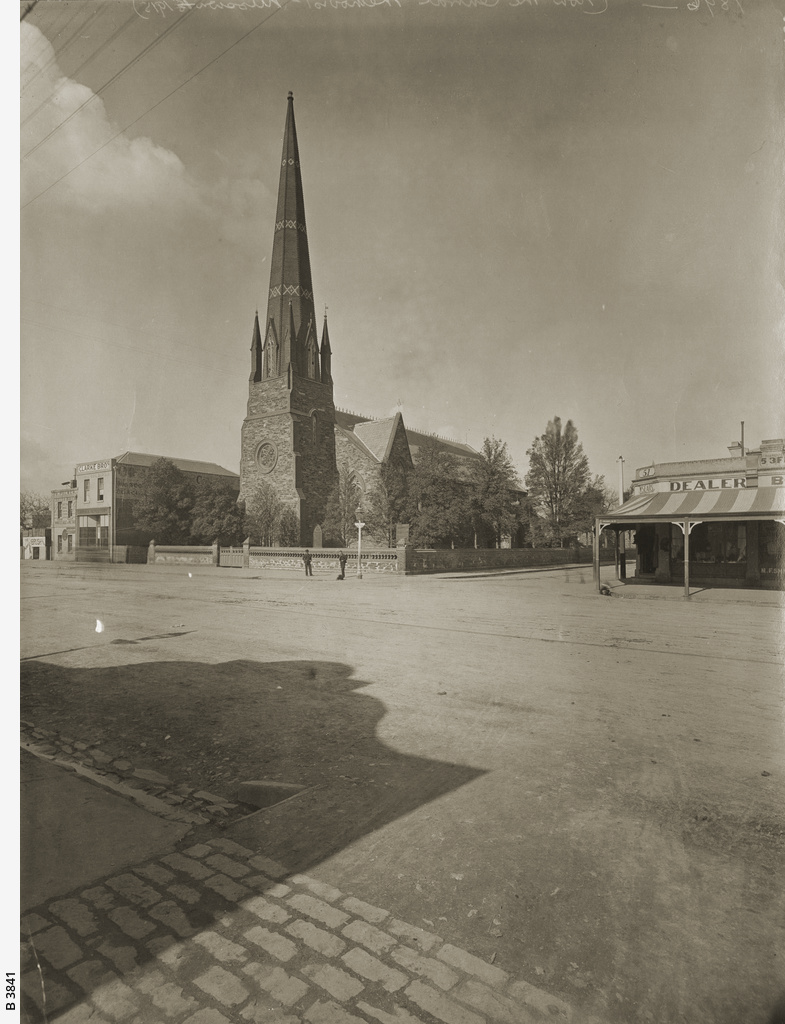
Maughan Church, 1896

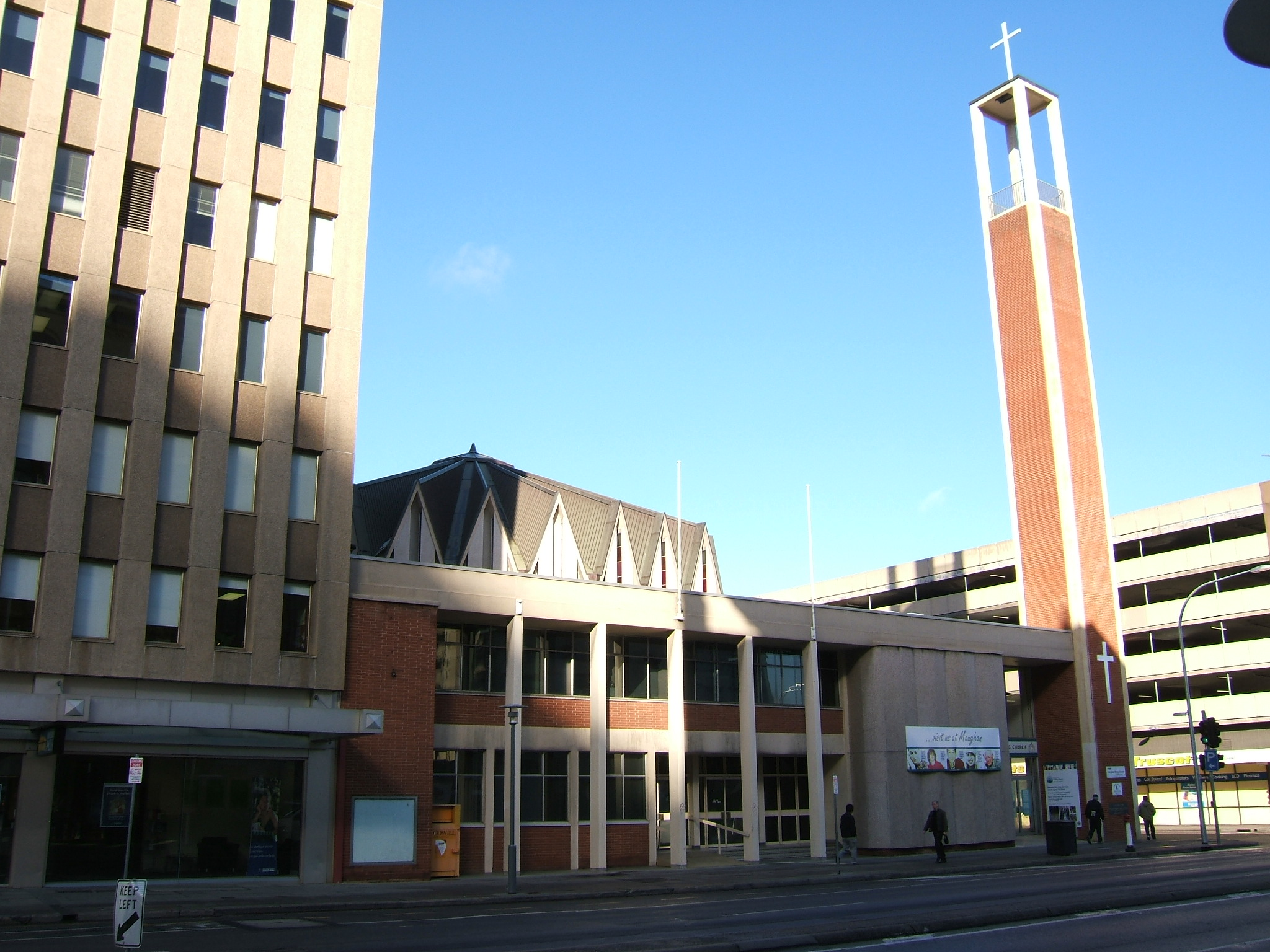
Maughan Church, 2010 (built 1965)

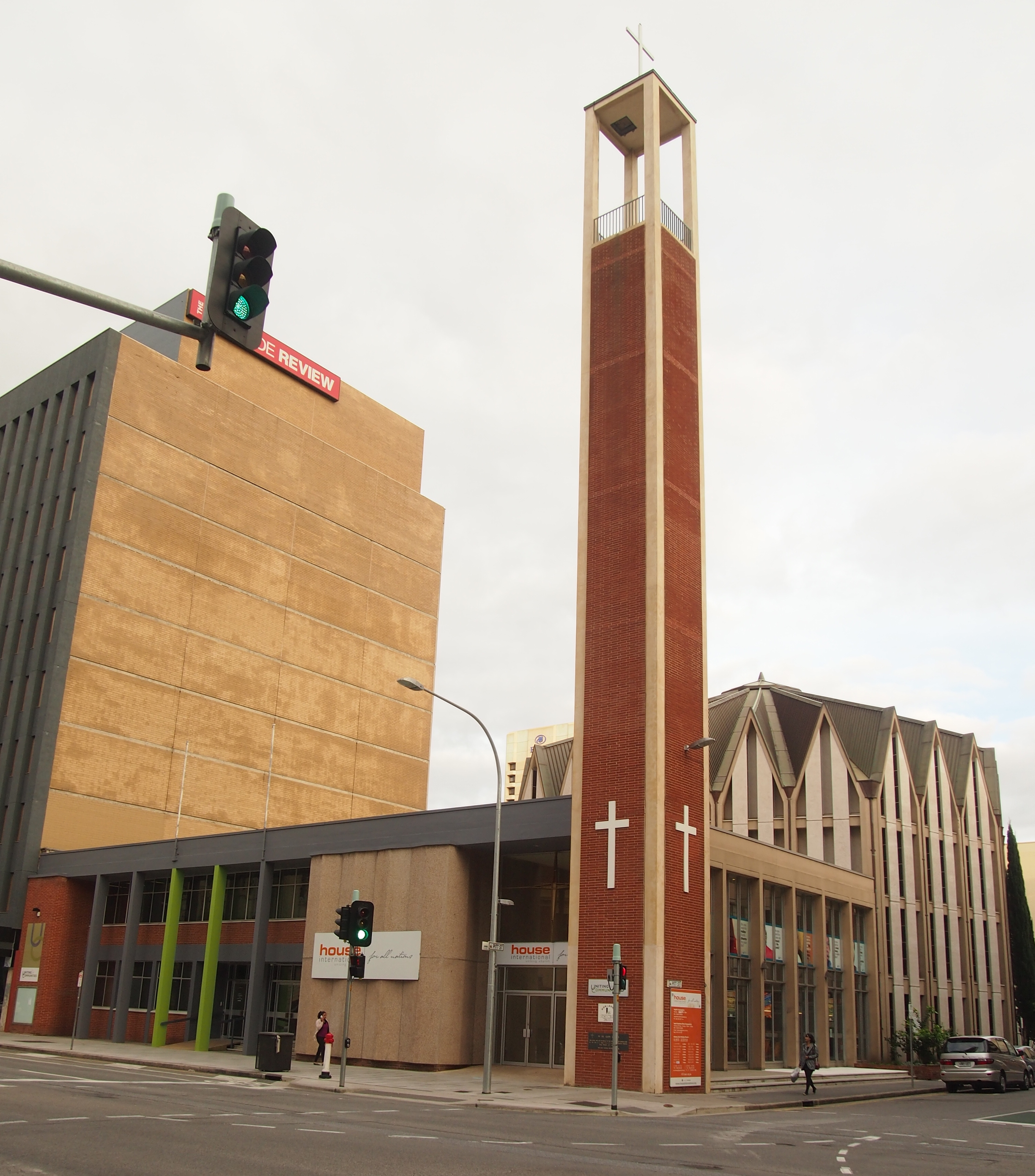
Maughan Uniting Church, 2014

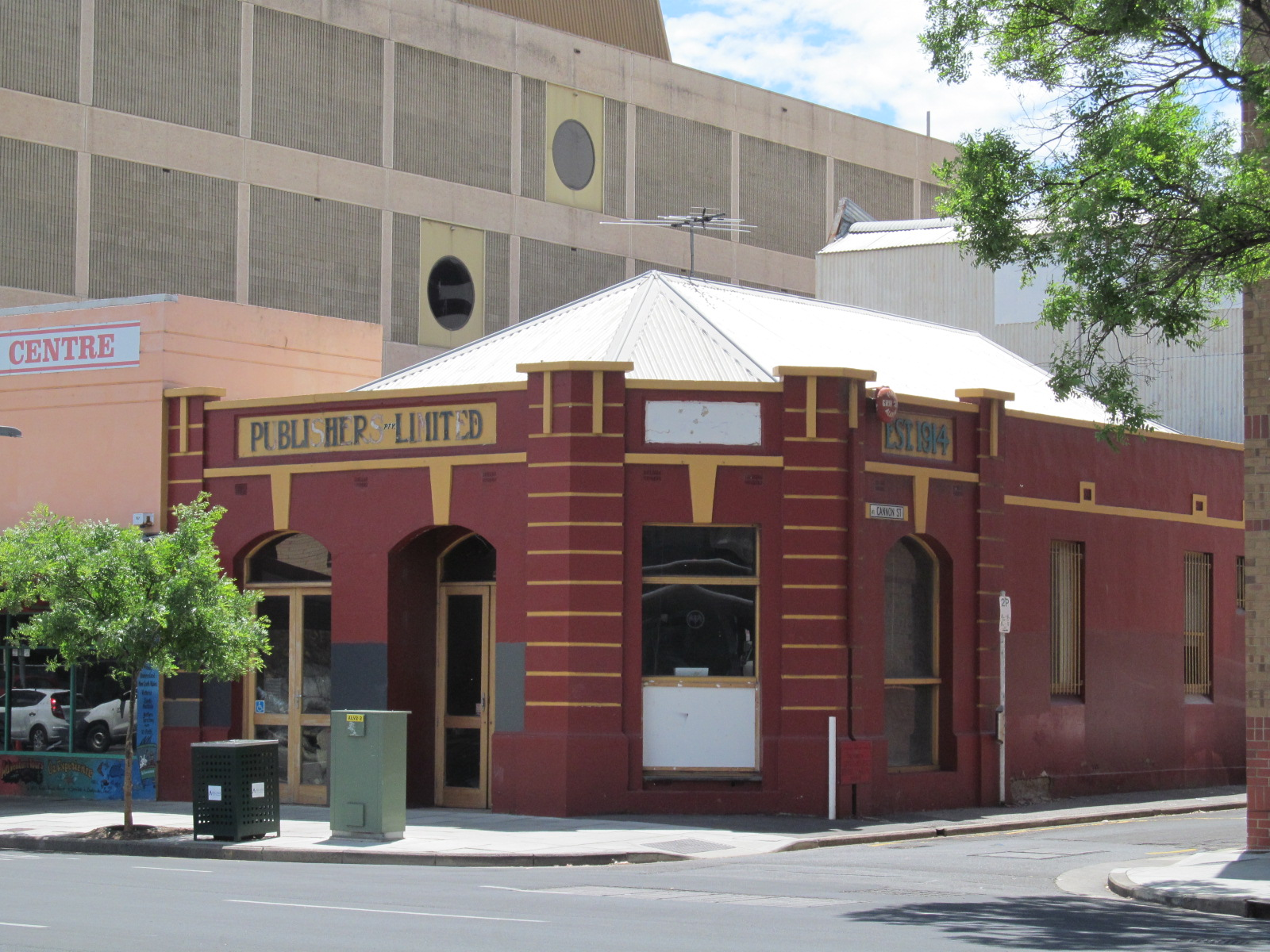
Publishers Limited, 2012 (built 1914)

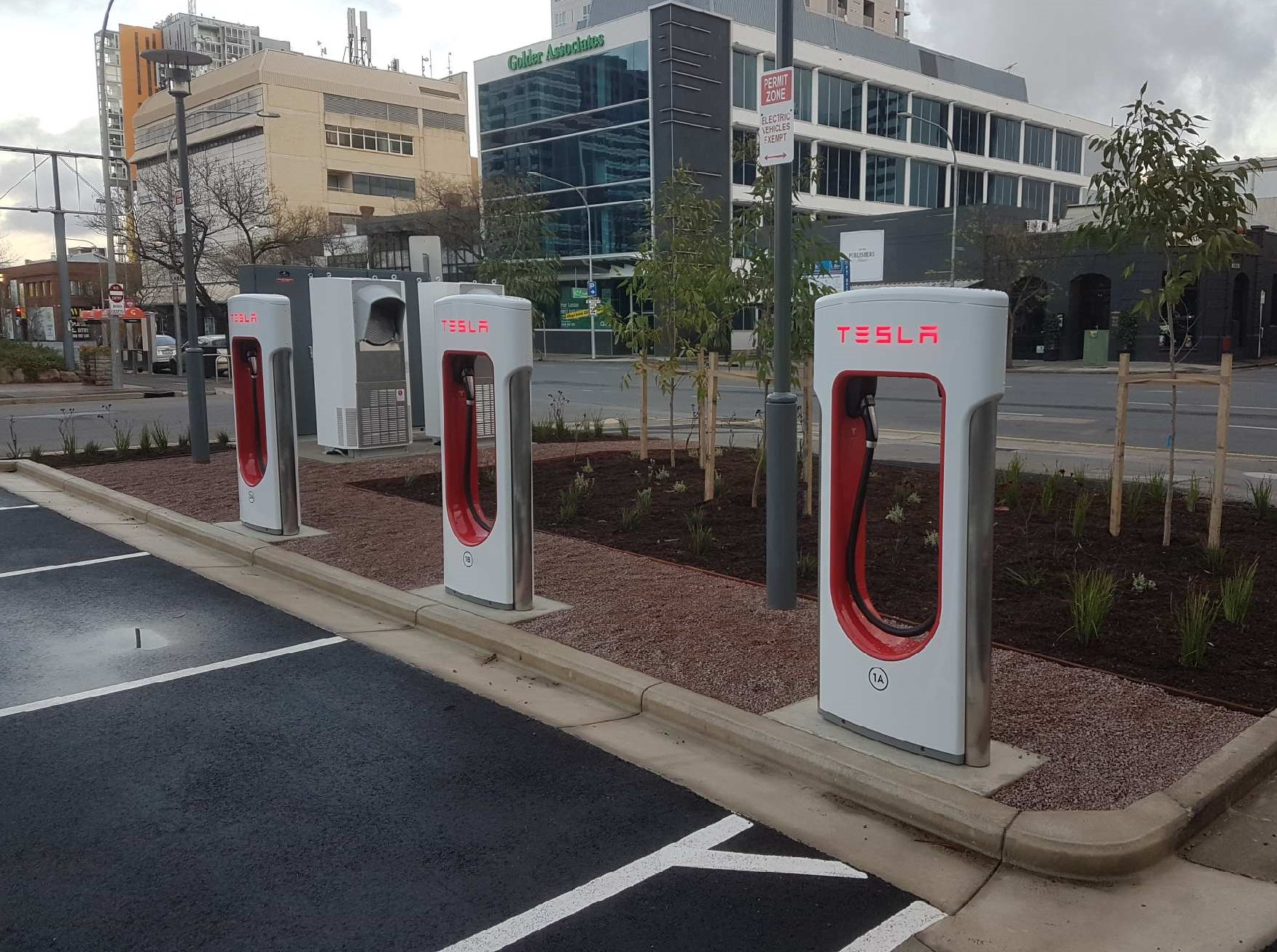
Tesla Superchargers
