= Eynesbury Senior College =

Former senior high school in Adelaide, South Australia

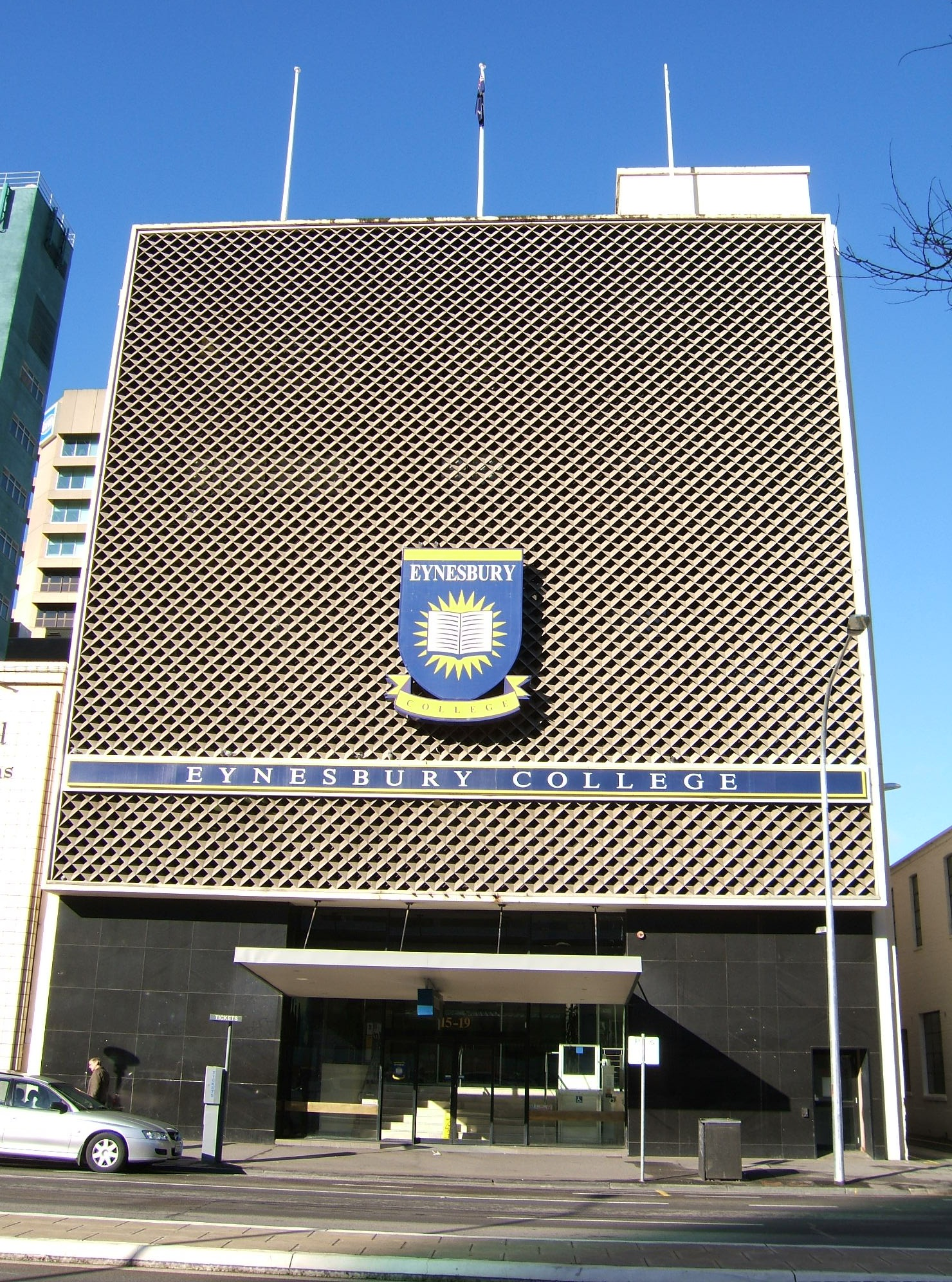
- The Franklin Street college campus

Location
- 15–19 Franklin Street, Adelaide, South Australia; 5000; Australia; 34°55′39″S 138°35′54″E

Information
- Type: Independent senior high school
- Motto: Many faces, different pathways – one goal...
- Established: 1989; 37 years ago
- Founder: Tony Stimson
- Closed: December 2021
- Principal: Claire Flenley
- Years offered: 10–12
- Newspaper: Eynesbury Times
- Website: www.esc.sa.edu.au

Eynesbury Senior College was an independent co-educational senior high school that operated between 1990 and 2021. It was located on Franklin Street in the city centre of Adelaide, South Australia in a five-storey, multi-function complex and catered for Year 10, 11 and 12 students.

Due to the impact the Coronavirus pandemic had on the number of international students enrolled at the school, Eynesbury Senior College stopped operation at the end of the 2021 academic year.

The college was characterised by an adult learning environment and approach to senior secondary education without the extra-curricular activities, extensive sporting programs, festivals and other activities featured in other schools. Teachers were available outside scheduled class times for one-to-one support, with students encouraged to see their teachers as colleagues and address them by their first name.

Eynesbury was known for its record of consistent academic success. The median Australian Tertiary Admission Rank of its students was around 87-90 each year with about 95% going on to undertake tertiary studies.

== History ==
=== Eynesbury House ===
Eynesbury House
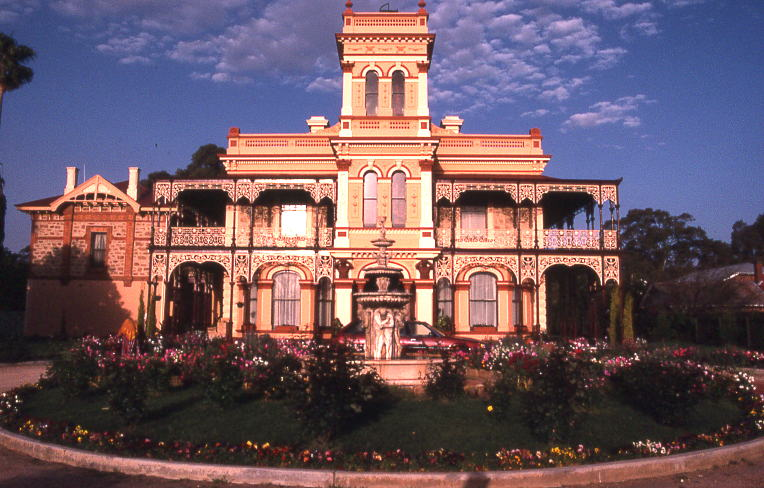
- The Kingswood Campus: Eynesbury House, pictured in 2008
- Interactive map of Eynesbury House
- Type: Former dwelling; now educational institution
- Etymology: Eynesbury, Cambridgeshire, England
- Location: 69 Belair Road, Kingswood, South Australia

History
- Built: 1880–1881
- Built for: William Martin Letchford

Site notes
- Area: 5.7 hectares (14 acres)
- Architectural styles: Italianate, Victorian Filigree
- Owner: Eynesbury Senior College

South Australian Heritage Register
- Official name: Eynesbury House (former dwelling)
- Designated: 12 January 1984
- Reference no.: 11526

Eynesbury House Senior Secondary College was established in 1989 in Eynesbury House, a heritage-listed late-Victorian Italianate former mansion located at 69 Belair Road, in the Adelaide suburb of Kingswood. The mansion was built by William Martin Letchford (1824–1880) on 6 hectares (14 acres) of land subdivided in 1854. With the death of Letchford's second wife in 1872, he moved to Glenelg and sold the property to businessman George Wilcox who named it Eynesbury and enhanced it considerably. The house was added to the South Australian Heritage Register on 12 January 1984. The name of the house was derived from Eynesbury, Cambridgeshire, in England.

At one stage, the house was occupied by Hare Krishnas and the transition from the temple to Eynesbury Senior College was completed in 1989 after the establishment of a laboratory and library.

=== Eynesbury College ===
Eynesbury became a registered school on 1 October 1989. The first intake of Year 11 and Year 12 students was in mid-January 1990, with an initial enrolment of 140 students. The school was initially registered as Eynesbury House Senior Secondary College. However it became known as Eynesbury College.

By 1995 the school had outgrown the Kingswood Campus and, in January 1996, a second larger campus was opened in Franklin Street in the heart of the city of Adelaide. Eynesbury remained a two-campus school until the end of 2001, when teaching was consolidated at an expanded and upgraded Franklin Street campus. Redevelopment of the Franklin Street campus took place over several stages. The first stage involved an extensive upgrade of electrical services, fire protection and the construction of laboratories. This was followed with the rebuilding of reception areas, the construction of additional computing classrooms and science laboratories, and the redevelopment of the outdoor terrace on the second floor as a modern, cafe-style recreation area for students. A new Drama centre was opened in July 2005. In Eynesbury's largest single capital development, the building's air conditioning plant was replaced in 2006. The original two lifts of the Franklin Street campus were replaced in early 2009.

Eynesbury celebrated its 20th birthday in 2009 with the opening of a new campus. Located in Coglin Street, Adelaide, the new campus was the location for the majority of Eynesbury's international students. The Eynesbury Institute of Business and Technology (EIBT) moved to the new campus in April 2009 and other programs followed soon after.

=== Closure ===
On the 16th of June 2021, Eynesbury Senior College announced it would close at the end of the 2021 academic year. Eynesbury Senior College chairman Stephen Spencer said the pending closure was due to the international border closure caused by the Covid-19 pandemic.

Before the international border closure, Navitas provided Eynesbury Senior College with up to 40 percent of its cohort through international students. It also provides us with staff, our Franklin Street campus, and essential shared facilities. He said.

Due to these reasons Navitas could no longer provide Eynesbury Senior College with a campus or the necessary facilities, support and, importantly, the international students that were required to remain operational.

The College Council explored and exhausted available options, including relocation of the campus and partnerships with other educational institutions. None of these options proved feasible and there was no viable alternative to closure at the end of 2021. Without the financial benefits of international students, remaining open in these circumstances could compromise the quality of the education that the students expect and deserve and affect their ability to attract and retain quality teaching staff.

== Curriculum ==
=== Senior High School ===
As a specialist college with students only in Years 10, 11 and 12, emphasis was placed on helping students prepare for tertiary studies. There were two lessons per week in each subject, each lesson being 1 hour and 50 minutes, with an informal break in the middle. Students were not required to be on campus during unscheduled lesson time.

New students could commence studies at the start of the first or second semester of Year 10 or Year 11. Year 12 students enrolled from the start of the year. Entry involved an extensive interview process, where future plans and directions, along with approaches to independent learning, were discussed. Eynesbury supported the notion of individualised programming, and students could undertake subjects at more than one year level.

There was an expectation that all students were engaged in full-time study at all times of their enrolment. Part-time study was typically only taken by students in Year 13 who wish to 'top-up' their results from Year 12. Under new legislation in South Australia, from 1 January 2009, all students under 17 years of age are to be engaged in full-time study or full-time work.

==== Year 10 ====
All students in Year 10 at Eynesbury studied a combination of compulsory whole year core subjects including English/English as a Second Language, 'Learning about Thinking', Mathematics, Science and Studies of Society and Environment. Choice subjects included: ASX Stock Exchange Challenge, Business Studies (Financial Literacy), Debating, Creative Writing, Drama, French, Health and Nutrition, Introduction to History, History Through Film, Electronic and Digital Publishing, Physical Education and Visual investigations. All Year 10 students were involved in the Eynesbury Mentor Program which incorporated the SACE Personal Learning Plan.

==== Year 11 ====
All students in Year 11 at Eynesbury studied a minimum of 110 credits (a whole year program), even if some Stage 1 units have already been completed. Students will be required to select 100 credits in addition to undertaking the Personal Learning Plan (10 credits) if necessary and the start of the Research Project.

The following subjects were offered at Stage 1 level: Accounting, Ancient Studies, Australian and International Politics, Biology, Business and Enterprise, Chemistry, Drama, Economics, English, English as a Second Language (ESL), Environmental Studies, French (Beginners Level), French (Continuers Level), Geography, Information Technology Systems, Japanese (Continuers Level), Legal Studies, Mathematics, Modern History, Physics, Psychology, Visual Arts - Art, Visual Arts - Design.

==== Year 12 ====
To be eligible for selection to a university program or course a student must have completed 80 credits of Tertiary Admissions Subjects (TAS). It is expected that all students will complete 80 credits of TAS by the end of Year 12. The following subjects were offered at Stage 2 level: Accounting, Australian and International Politics, Biology, Business and Enterprise, Chemistry, Chinese (Background Speakers Level), Classical Studies, Drama, Economics, English as a Second Language Studies, English Communications, English Studies, French (Continuers), Geography, Information Technology Studies, Japanese (Continuers), Legal Studies, Mathematical Applications, Mathematical Methods, Mathematical Studies, Specialist Mathematics, Modern History, Physics, Psychology.

=== Foundation Studies Program ===
In 1992, Eynesbury College delivered the first University Foundation Studies Program (FSP) in South Australia on behalf of the University of Adelaide. In 1994, Flinders University and the University of South Australia joined the program which became the South Australian Universities’ Foundation Studies Program. Foundation students were given provisional admission into the degree of their choice, subject to performance in the Foundation Studies Program. Admission was confirmed when students completed the Program and achieved the necessary entry score for that degree as set by the relevant target university.

In 2011, 96% of students who completed the FSP gained university places. The South Australian Universities’ Foundation Studies Program was recognised for entry into interstate universities (subject to meeting entry requirements) including the University of Melbourne, the University of New South Wales, Monash University, the University of Queensland and the University of Western Australia.

==== Standard and Accelerated Foundation Studies Programs ====
A Standard Foundation Studies Program commenced in January and completed in December. Students enrolled in Standard FSP studied several of their subjects with Australian Year 12 High School students. Three courses were compulsory for all FSP students:

- Language and Communication (4 hours per week - full course)
- International Studies (2 hours - half course), and
- Clear Thinking and Logic (2 hours - half course).

Students undertaking the Standard FSP (or Stage 2 of the Extended FSP) also took at least three electives from five streams of specialisation, and attended four hours per week for each elective course.

An Accelerated FSP commenced in April and ended in December. The Standard and Accelerated programs both led to a February intake of university. In addition, an Accelerated FSP commencing in September prepared students for mid-year (July) entry to university.

Student assessments for Standard and Accelerated FSP are based on work completed throughout the year and on a final examination held at the end of the course. Each full course is marked out of 100 and the marks of the two half courses (50 each) are added together and counted as one full course. An aggregate score out of 500 is calculated. For students taking three electives this is a simple addition of all marks. Students must achieve a score of 60% or more in Language and Communication, and 275 overall to be considered for admission, subject to specific degree entry scores and quotas. This provides a base score for consideration for entry to Australian universities.

==== Extended Foundation Studies Program ====
The Extended FSP is suitable for students who require some additional language development and/or revision in key academic areas. The Extended Program is 4 terms (15 months) in duration. Students take some of the first term (13 weeks) in separate classes specifically designed for Extended Foundation students with a focus on key competencies, skills and content essential for success at Foundation level. During this term, students take three 10-week Core courses (compulsory) and the equivalent of two 10-week Elective courses.

The following courses are compulsory: Language and Study Skills, An Introduction to Communication and Critical Thinking, Mathematics. Students select the equivalent of two full courses from the following introductory areas: An Introduction to Biological Sciences (Biology, Chemistry), An Introduction to the Pure Sciences (Physics, Chemistry, Additional Mathematics) and An Introduction to International Business (Accounting, Economics).

In January, successful Extended Program students join students from the Standard Foundation Studies Program and are integrated into classes with Australian and International Year 12 students for several Elective courses.

Assessment is conducted in two stages. The first stage is the assessment of Term 1 courses (as listed above). The assessment of Term 2 – 5 courses as per the Standard Foundation Studies Program is the second stage of evaluation. Assessment at both stages is based on 50% continuous assessment and 50% for final examinations. Results in the first stage are used to assess successful transition to the second stage. They are not used for the final assessment in the second stage or transition to university.

== See also ==
- List of schools in South Australia
