= West Torrens District Football Association =

The West Torrens District Football Association (WTDFA) was an Australian rules football competition based in the western suburbs of Adelaide, South Australia that initially ran from 1921 to 1926, folded, and then reformed for another 15 years from 1947. The association was first established following a meeting on 8 February 1921 involving the Kilkenny United, West Suburban, Croydon, Torrensides, Woodville and Underdale clubs along with the West Torrens Football Committee where it was decided to form an association.

== First era (1921–1926) ==
=== Member clubs ===
| Club | Years participating | Other names |
|---|---|---|
| Brompton | 1925–26 | Brompton Juniors (1925) |
| Brompton United | 1921 | |
| Croydon Juniors | 1923 | |
| Croydon Union | 1921–26 | |
| Ethelton | 1925 | |
| Henley and Grange | 1924–26 | |
| Henley Juniors | 1925 | |
| Kilkenny United | 1921–23 | |
| Lockleys | 1924–26 | |
| St. Saviour | 1921–24 | |
| Torrens Central | 1925 | |
| Torrenside | 1921–26 | |
| Torrensville United | 1924–25 | |
| Underdale United | 1921–26 | |
| West Suburban | 1921 | |
| West Torrens Centrals | 1922–25 | |
| Woodville Catholics | 1922–25 | |
| Woodville United | 1921–22 | |

=== Premierships ===
| Year | A-Grade |
|---|---|
| 1921 | Kilkenny United |
| 1922 | Underdale United |
| 1923 | Underdale United |
| 1924 | Croydon Union |
| 1925 | Croydon Union |
| 1926 | Underdale United |

== Second era (1947–1961) ==
=== Member clubs ===
| Club | Years participating | Other names |
|---|---|---|
| Albert Druids | 1947–61 | |
| Brompton | 1947–60 | |
| Brooklyn Park | 1950 | |
| Davies Coop | 1948–49 | |
| Don Bosco | 1949–50 | |
| Ethelton | 1952–56 | |
| Flinders Park | 1947–49 | |
| Grange | 1947–53 | |
| Henley Beach | 1947–52 | |
| Hindmarsh | 1948–50 | |
| Kilkenny United | 1947-52; 1957-60 | |
| Lockleys | 1951–59 | |
| North Croydon | 1948–52 | |
| Rosatala | 1952–53 | |
| Seaton Ramblers | 1958–60 | |
| Torrensville United | 1947–60 | |
| Woodville B | 1949–51 | |
| Woodville North | 1948–49 | |

=== Premierships ===
| Year | Blue Division | Gold Division |
|---|---|---|
| 1947 | Flinders Park (undefeated) | Torrensville United |
| 1948 | Flinders Park | Grange |
| 1949 | Hindmarsh | Brompton |
| 1950 | Henley Beach (undefeated) | Woodville B |
| 1951 | Henley Beach (undefeated) | Lockleys |
| 1952 | Henley Beach | Ethelton |
| 1953 | Lockleys | |
| 1954 | Albert Druids | |
| 1955 | Torrensville | |
| 1956 | Hindmarsh | |
| 1957 | Brompton | |
| 1958 | Albert Druids | |
| 1959 | Brompton | |
| 1960 | Brompton | |
| 1961 | Albert Druids | |
