= United Church Football Association =

Australian rules football competition (1906–1977)

The United Church Football Association was an Australian rules football competition based in the suburbs of Adelaide, South Australia from 1906 to 1977.

The competition was formed in April 1906 when delegates of some football clubs connected to churches in Adelaide met to establish a church association. The initial six clubs were Clayton Congregational, East Adelaide Methodist, Stanley Street Congregational, St Giles' Presbyterian, St Luke's Church of England, and St Mark's Church of England.

== Stanley Shield ==
The Stanley Shield was awarded to the champion team of the association from 1913. The shield was presented to the winner of a playoff between the A1 and A2 premiers. It was named after the Stanley Street team (later Thompson Memorial), which won three premierships in a row from 1910 to 1912.

Non A-Division/A1 Premiers in bold.

Year	Champions
1913	**Brompton** **Methodist**
1914	**Prospect** **Methodist**
1915	Walkerville Methodist
1916-1918	In Recess
1919	Glen Osmond Baptist
1920	Franklin Street Methodist
1921	Franklin Street Methodist
1922	Unley Methodist
1923	St Augustine's
1924	Unley Methodist
1925	St Augustine's
1926	Unley Methodist
1927	St Augustine's
1928	Unley Methodist
1929	Flinders Park Methodist
1930	Flinders Park Methodist
1931	Flinders Park Methodist
1932	Flinders Park Methodist
1933	Prospect Methodist
1934	Queenstown Church of Christ
1935	Queenstown Church of Christ
1936	Queenstown Church of Christ
1937	Queenstown Church of Christ
1938	
1939	St Patrick's
1940	
1941	
1942-1945	In Recess
1946	Queenstown Church of Christ
1947	**Park Street Church of Christ**
1948	**Royal Park** **Methodist**
1949	Royal Park Methodist
1950	
1951	Ovingham Methodist
1952	Ovingham Methodist
1953	Maylands Methodist
1954	
1955	
1956	
1957	
1958	
1959	
1960	
1961	
1962	
1963	
1964	
1965	
1966	
1967	
1968	
1969	
1970	
1971	
1972	
1973	
1974	
1975	
1976	
1977	

== Premierships ==
Year	A Division	B Division	C Division	D Division
1906	St Giles' Presbyterian			
1907	St Giles' Presbyterian			
1908	Stanley Street Congregational			
1909	St Luke's Church of England	Chapel Street		
1910	Stanley Street Congregational			
1911	Stanley Street Congregational			
1912	Stanley Street Congregational Undefeated	Parkside Methodist		
1913	Parkside Methodist	Brompton Methodist		
1914	St. Luke's Church of England	Walkerville Methodist	Richmond Baptist	
1915	Walkerville Methodist	Richmond Baptist		
1916 - 1918	In Recess (World War I)			
1919	Glen Osmond Baptist			
1920	Franklin Street Methodist Undefeated			
1921	Franklin Street Methodist			
1922	Unley Methodist Undefeated	Robert Street Church of Christ	Maylands Church of Christ	
1923	St. Augustine's Church of England			
1924	Unley Methodist	St Lawrence's		

Year	A1	A2	B1	B2
1925	St. Augustine's Church of England	Hindmarsh Place Christian Church	Mile End Church of Christ Undefeated	St James' Church of England
1926	Unley Methodist	Mile End Church of Christ	St James' Church of England	Royal Park Methodist
1927	St Augustine's Undefeated	Hindmarsh Baptist	Royal Park Methodist	Flinders Park Methodist
1928	Unley Methodist	St Cuthbert's Church of England	St James' Church of England	Queenstown Church of Christ
1929	Flinders Park Methodist	Burnside Christian Church	Clayton Congregational	
1930	Flinders Park Methodist	Clayton Congregational	Manthorpe Memorial	

Year	A Division	B Division	C Division	D Division
1931	Flinders Park Methodist	Queenstown Church of Christ	Maylands Church of Christ	
1932	Flinders Park Methodist	Norwood Church of Christ	College Park Congregational	
1933	Prospect Methodist	Manthorpe Memorial	Hindmarsh Baptist	
1934	Queenstown Church of Christ Undefeated	Brompton Methodist	Torrensville Methodist	St Giles' Presbyterian
1935	Queenstown Church of Christ Undefeated	St Patrick's		
1936	Queenstown Church of Christ Undefeated	Otiose	Port Adelaide Presbyterian	
1937	Queenstown Church of Christ	Port Adelaide Presbyterian	Unley Methodist	Clayton Congregational
1938	Queenstown Church of Christ	Norman Memorial	Croydon Methodist Undefeated	St Cuthbert's Church of England
1939	St Patrick's	Alberton Baptist	Holder Memorial	Ovingham Methodist
1940	Prospect Methodist	West Croydon Methodist	North Adelaide Baptist	Queen of Angels
1941	Queenstown Church of Christ	Queen of Angels	Holy Cross	
1942 - 1945	In Recess (World War II)			
1946	Queenstown Church of Christ	Enfield Methodist	Ovingham Methodist	
1947	Queenstown Church of Christ	Park Street Church of Christ	Royal Park Methodist	
1948	Prospect Methodist	Royal Park Methodist	West Croydon and North Adelaide Baptist	
1949	Royal Park Methodist	Colonel Light Gardens United	Richmond Baptist	
1950		Richmond Baptist	Unley Methodist	
1951	Ovingham Methodist	Malvern Methodist		
1952	Ovingham Methodist	Maylands Methodist		
1953	Maylands Methodist	Royal Park Methodist		
1954	Maylands Methodist	Allenby Gardens Methodist		
1955				
1956				
1957				
1958				
1959				
1960				
1961				
1962				
1963				
1964				
1965				
1966				
1967				
1968	Port Adelaide Presbyterian			
1969	Port Adelaide Presbyterian			
1970	Port Adelaide Presbyterian			
1971	Port Adelaide Presbyterian			
1972	Port Adelaide Presbyterian			
1973	Port Adelaide Presbyterian			

Year	A1	A2	B1	B2
1974	Port Adelaide Presbyterian	Brighton Methodist	Adelaide Lutheran	
1975	Adelaide Lutheran	Enfield Methodist		
1976	Adelaide Lutheran			
1977				

== Medallists ==
=== Moyes Medal ===
The Moyes Medal (officially called the John Moyes Memorial Trophy), named after Mr John Moyes who had founded the association, was awarded to the best overall player in the association.

- 1925 - A. Hamlyn
- 1926 - Burton (Prospect Methodist)
- 1927 - C. Rowbotham (Thompson Memorial)
- 1928 - H. Caller (Robert Street Church of Christ)
- 1931 - S. P. Burton (Prospect Methodist)
- 1934 - Tucker (Prospect Methodist)
- 1935 - C. Young (Maylands Church of Christ)
- 1938 - D. Bussell (Hindmarsh Baptist)
- 1940 - R. Day (Hindmarsh Baptist)
- 1971 - R. Lutze (Adelaide Lutheran)
- 1972 - D. Menzel (Adelaide Lutheran)
- 1975 - T. Parsons (Enfield Methodist)
- 1976 - J. Birch (Ovingham Methodist)
- 1977 - B. Miegel (Adelaide Lutheran)

McLennan Medal

- 1976 - T. Parsons (Enfield Methodist)

=== Philps Medal (A-Division Medal) ===
- 1931 - G. Walton (Flinders Park Methodist)
- 1935 - S. Chaplin (Manthorpe Memorial)
- 1940 - R. Day (Hindmarsh Baptist)

=== Patron's Medal (B-Division Medal) ===
- 1925 - M Knight
- 1926 - Pastor W. Graham (Fullarton Church of Christ)
- 1927 - R Lane (Clayton Congregational)
- 1931 - L Kelton (Grote Street Church of Christ)
- 1934 - Toseland (St Bartholomew's)
- 1935 - DJ Cahill (St Patrick's)
- 1938 - M Purdie (Prospect Church of Christ)
- 1940 - J Turnbull (Ovingham Methodist)

=== C-Division Medal ===
- 1934 - Hall (Spicer and All Souls)
- 1935 - C. Young (Maylands Church of Christ)
- 1938 - Wilson (Maylands Church of Christ)
- 1940 - W. Matthews (Maylands Church of Christ)

=== Patron's Medal (D-Division Medal) ===
- 1934 - Lyons (St Giles')
- 1938 - Kinter (Mile End Church of Christ)
- 1940 - D. Reddin (Parkside West Methodist)

== Member Clubs ==
Club	Denomination	Known Years Participating	Notes
Adelaide Congress Hall	Salvation Army		
Adelaide Lutheran	Lutheran	1951-79	St Steven's Lutheran (1951–52)
Alberton Baptist	Baptist	1935-47	
Alberton East Baptist	Baptist	1948-50	
Alberton and Ottaway United		1951-54	
Alberton Methodist	Uniting (Methodist)	1940	
All Saints		1927-35	
All Souls and Spicer	Uniting (Methodist)	1933-40	All Soul's and Spicer Memorial United (1933), Spicer and All Souls (1934–35)
Allenby Gardens	Uniting (Methodist)	1954-67	Allenby Gardens Methodist (1954)
Ambleside		1920	
Bowden Baptist	Baptist	1914-20	
Bowden Methodist	Uniting (Methodist)	1913-15	
Brighton Congregational	Uniting (Congregational)	1932	
Brighton Tigers	Uniting (Methodist)	1963-77	Brighton Methodist (1963–76)
Brompton Methodist	Uniting (Methodist)	1911-35	
Brooklyn Park Church of Christ	Church of Christ	1946-49	
Brooklyn Park U.C.	Uniting (Methodist)	1941	
Burnside Christian Church	Baptist	1923-36	
Campbelltown Methodist	Uniting (Methodist)	1911	
Cathedral		1911-13	
Chapel Street	Church of Christ	1907-13	
Clayton Congregational	Uniting (Congregational)	1906-37	
Clayton Methodist	Uniting (Methodist)	1931	
Clayton Norwood		1952	
Clayton and Wesley United	Uniting (Methodist)	1949-54	
College Park Congregational	Uniting (Congregational)	1928-48	
Colonel Light Gardens United	Uniting	1947-50	Colonel Light Gardens Presbyterian and Congregational United (1947)
Cottonville Church of Christ	Church of Christ	1924-25	
Cowandilla Church of Christ	Church of Christ	1925-28	
Croydon Church of Christ	Church of Christ	1927-31, 1937-46	
Croydon Congregational	Uniting (Congregational)	1930-32	
Croydon Methodist	Uniting (Methodist)	1936-41	
Draper Memorial	Uniting (Methodist)	1909-21	
Dulwich Park Congregational	Uniting (Congregational)	1932	
Dulwich Rovers		1919	
East Adelaide Methodist	Uniting (Methodist)	1906-08	
Edwardstown Baptist	Baptist	1974	
Enfield Methodist	Uniting (Methodist)	1934-54	
Flinders Park Methodist	Uniting (Methodist)	1927-32	
Flinders Street Baptist	Baptist	1910-14	
Franklin Street Methodist	Uniting (Methodist)	1913-21	
Franklin Street West Methodist	Uniting (Methodist)	1914-20	
Fullarton Church of Christ	Church of Christ	1926-50	
Gartrell Memorial Methodist	Uniting (Methodist)	1924-25, 1946-54	
Gartrell-Tusmore Methodist	Uniting (Methodist)	1948	
Glen Osmond Baptist	Baptist	1919	
Glenelg Church of Christ	Church of Christ	1927-48	
Glenunga Methodist	Uniting (Methodist)	1954	
Goodwood Baptist	Baptist	1932-33	
Goodwood Methodist	Uniting (Methodist)	1912-14, 1929-30	
Greek Orthodox	Greek Orthodox	1968	
Grote Street Church of Christ	Church of Christ	1929-31	
Henley Congregational	Uniting (Congregational)	1941	
Henley Methodist	Uniting (Methodist)	1941	
Highgate Congregational	Uniting (Congregational)	1934-35	
Hindmarsh Baptist	Baptist	1908-40	
Hindmarsh Church of Christ	Church of Christ	1924	
Hindmarsh Place Christian Church	Church of Christ	1925-28	
Holder Memorial	Uniting (Methodist)	1925-54	
Holy Cross	Catholic	1941	
Holy Trinity	Anglican	1926-28	
Immanuel Old Scholars	Lutheran	1977	
Islington Methodist	Uniting (Methodist)	1913-14	
Kent Town Methodist	Uniting (Methodist)	1934-35	
Kent Town Rovers		1919	
Keswick Methodist	Uniting (Methodist)	1929-30	
Kilkenny United		1919-21	
Madge Memorial Methodist	Uniting (Methodist)	1946-48	
Malvern Methodist	Uniting (Methodist)	1912-13, 1950-54	
Malvern and Rosefield Methodist	Uniting (Methodist)	1934-41, 1946-49	
Manthorpe Memorial	Uniting (Congregational)	1923-35	
Marryatville Juniors		1919	
Maylands Church of Christ	Church of Christ	1922-40, 1947-48	
Maylands Church of Christ and St Peters Presbyterian	mixed	1941	merger
Maylands Methodist	Uniting (Methodist)	1911-12, 1941, 1946-54	
Mile End Church of Christ	Church of Christ	1924-30, 1938, 1950	
Mile End and Dulwich Church of Christ	Church of Christ	1948-49	
Mitchell Memorial	Uniting (Presbyterian)	1925-30, 1934-35	Goodwood Presbyterian (1925–30)
Nailsworth Church of Christ	Church of Christ	1947-48	
Norman Memorial	Uniting (Congregational)	1936-39	
North Adelaide Baptist	Baptist	1907-15, 1920–25, 1938–41, 1946	
North Adelaide Juniors		1919	
North Adelaide Methodist	Uniting (Methodist)	1946-47	
Norwood and Kensington Methodist	Uniting (Methodist)	1933-38	
Norwood and Maylands Methodist United	Uniting (Methodist)	1932	
Norwood Baptist	Baptist	1930-34	
Norwood Church of Christ	Church of Christ	1929-33	
Norwood Methodist	Uniting (Methodist)	1930-35	
Norwood Wesley	Uniting (Methodist)	1907-20	
OTIOSE		1933-37	
Ovingham Methodist	Uniting (Methodist)	1913-15, 1925–26, 1939-76	
Park Street Church of Christ	Church of Christ	1924-27, 1937–40, 1946-48	
Parkside Methodist	Uniting (Methodist)	1911-13	became Kenilworth 1914
Parkside West Methodist	Uniting (Methodist)	1924-27, 1938-40	
Payneham Methodist	Uniting (Methodist)	1909-10, 1936–40, 1947-49	
Payneham and Woodville United		1950-52	
Port Adelaide Presbyterian	Uniting (Presbyterian)	1935-38, 1961-77	
Prospect Church of Christ	Church of Christ	1937-49	
Prospect Methodist	Uniting (Methodist)	1913-54	Prospect Methodists United (1950)
Prospect North Methodist	Uniting (Methodist)	1915	
Queen of Angels	Catholic	1939-41	
Queenstown Church of Christ	Church of Christ	1923-49, 1951-54	
Richmond Baptist	Baptist	1913-15, 1947-52	
Robert Street Church of Christ	Church of Christ	1922-30, 1937-38	
Royal Park Methodist	Uniting (Methodist)	1926-30, 1947-54	
Semaphore Baptist	Baptist	1935-36	
Semaphore Church of Christ	Church of Christ	1926-31	
St Augustine's Church of England	Anglican	1920-27	
St Bartholomew's Church of England	Anglican	1924-41, 1948-51	
St Cuthbert's Church of England	Anglican	1922-35, 1937-39	
St George's Church	Anglican	1909	
St Giles' Presbyterian	Uniting (Presbyterian)	1906-39	
St Ignatius'	Catholic	1924	
St James' Church of England	Anglican	1925-31	
St John's		1933	
St Laurence's	Catholic	1922-29	
St Luke's Church of England	Anglican	1906-15, 1919-20	
St Mark's Church of England	Anglican	1906-07, 1931, 1951	
St Mary's		1929	
St Mary Magdelene's	Anglican	1911-12	
St Michael's	Anglican	1913	
St Oswald's	Anglican	1926-27	
St Patrick's	Catholic	1930-40	
St Paul's	Anglican	1926	
St Peters Presbyterian	Uniting (Presbyterian)	1935-40	
St Saviour's	Catholic	1913-14	
St. Thomas'		1924	
Sturt Ramblers		1920	
Torrensville Methodist	Uniting (Methodist)	1933-35	
Thebarton Methodist	Uniting (Methodist)	1926-29	
Thompson Memorial	Uniting (Congregational)	1923-40	Stanley Street Congregational (1906–14)
Thompson, Spicer and All Souls	Uniting	1941	
Trinity	Anglican	1911	
Unley Methodist	Uniting (Methodist)	1920-41, 1947-54	
W.A. Baptists	Baptist	1926	
Walkerville Methodist	Uniting (Methodist)	1914-15, 1928-29	
Wellington Square Methodist	Uniting (Methodist)	1912-15, 1924-25	
Wesley	Uniting (Methodist)	1911	
West Croydon Methodist	Uniting (Methodist)	1935-41	
West Croydon Rovers		1926	
West Croydon-North Adelaide Baptist United	Baptist	1947-50	
West Hindmarsh Methodist	Uniting (Methodist)	1924	
Woodville District	Uniting (Methodist)		Mansfield Park Methodist (?-?)
Woodville Methodist	Uniting (Methodist)	1912-13, 1940	
Woodville Presbyterian	Uniting (Presbyterian)	1953-54	
Y.M.C.A.		1939	
