= 1989 VFL draft =

Draft for the Victorian Football League

The 1989 VFL draft was the fourth annual national draft held by the Victorian Football League (since changed its name to Australian Football League) as the main method for the 14 teams to recruit players for the 1990 season. It consisted of a trading period, pre-draft selections, the main national draft and the 1990 pre-season draft and a non-compulsory 1990 mid-year draft. The minimum age for most draftees was 16 and clubs other than the West Coast Eagles were only allowed to choose one player each from Western Australia. For the non-Queensland and NSW clubs, players from those states had to be 19 to be selected, by which time the Brisbane Bears or Sydney Swans would have had three chances to recruit them.

== Pre-draft picks ==
| Pick | Player | Drafted to | Recruited from | League | Games for new club |
|---|---|---|---|---|---|
| 1 | Peter Mann | West Coast | Claremont | WAFL | 0 |
| 2 | Ryan Turnbull | West Coast | Claremont | WAFL | 129 |
| 3 | Andrew Jarman | Brisbane Bears | North Adelaide | SANFL | 0 |
| 4 | Darren Jarman | Brisbane Bears | North Adelaide | SANFL | 0 |
| 5 | Kevin Caton | Brisbane Bears | Fitzroy | AFL | 8 |
| 6 | Peter Davidson | Brisbane Bears | West Coast | AFL | 7 |
| 7 | Brian Hinkley | Brisbane Bears | Essendon | AFL | 0 |
| 8 | Doug Smart | Brisbane Bears | North Adelaide | SANFL | 0 |
| 9 | Darren Denneman | Sydney | Geelong | AFL | 3 |
| 10 | Shane Fell | Sydney | Geelong | AFL | 15 |
| 11 | John Fidge | Sydney | Brisbane Bears | AFL | 0 |
| 12 | Paul Starbuck | Sydney | Carlton | AFL | 1 |

== Pre-draft trades ==
| Player | Traded to | Traded from | Games for new club |
|---|---|---|---|
| Peter Wilson | West Coast | Richmond | 117 |
| Gavin Keane | Brisbane Bears | Essendon | 7 |
| Trevor Poole | Geelong | Richmond | 54 |
| Gary Keane | Geelong | Fitzroy | 0 |
| Steven Clark | Melbourne | Essendon | 21 |
| Michael Scott | Melbourne | Geelong | 0 |
| Trevor Spencer | Melbourne | Essendon | 3 |
| Matthew Ryan | Sydney | Collingwood | 10 |

== 1989 national draft ==
| Round | Pick | Player | Drafted to | Recruited from | League | Games for new club |
|---|---|---|---|---|---|---|
| 1 | 1 | Anthony Banik | Richmond | Won Wron Woodside | Alberton Football League | 49 |
| 1 | 2 | Matthew Croft | Footscray | Mildura | Sunraysia Football League | 186 |
| 1 | 3 | Jody Arnol | St Kilda | North Hobart | TFL Statewide League | 13 |
| 1 | 4 | Peter Matera | West Coast | South Fremantle | WAFL | 253 |
| 1 | 5 | Brad Rowe | Brisbane Bears | East Fremantle | WAFL | 14 |
| 1 | 6 | Mark Brayshaw | North Melbourne | Claremont | WAFL | 32 |
| 1 | 7 | Stephen Edgar | Carlton | East Fremantle | WAFL | 14 |
| 1 | 8 | Brad Tunbridge | Sydney | East Fremantle | WAFL | 50 |
| 1 | 9 | Dale Kickett | Fitzroy | Claremont | WAFL | 15 |
| 1 | 10 | Daryl Groves | Collingwood | Maryborough | Bendigo Football League | 0 |
| 1 | 11 | Darren Smith | Essendon | Port Adelaide | SANFL | 0 |
| 1 | 12 | Gavin Wanganeen | Essendon | Port Adelaide | SANFL | 127 |
| 1 | 13 | Allister Scott | Richmond | Inverloch-Kongwak | Alberton Football League | 19 |
| 1 | 14 | Ben Allan | Hawthorn | Claremont | WAFL | 98 |
| 2 | 15 | Nathan Bower | Richmond | Mildura | Sunraysia Football League | 74 |
| 2 | 16 | Jason Shields | Footscray | Moe | Latrobe Valley Football League | 0 |
| 2 | 17 | Gilbert McAdam | St Kilda | Central District | SANFL | 53 |
| 2 | 18 | Robert Wren | Richmond | Assumption College | APS | 0 |
| 2 | 19 | Ashley Green | Essendon | Warragul | Latrobe Valley Football League | 0 |
| 2 | 20 | Brett Hawkey | North Melbourne | Nathalia | Murray Football League | 0 |
| 2 | 21 | Peter Doyle | Carlton | Union | | 0 |
| 2 | 22 | Mathew Hanrahan | Collingwood | Wickliffe-Lake Bolac | Mininera & District Football League | 0 |
| 2 | 23 | Roger Delaney | Fitzroy | Port Adelaide | SANFL | 1 |
| 2 | 24 | Michael Styles | Collingwood | Glenorchy | TFL Statewide League | 0 |
| 2 | 25 | Paul Rouvray | Melbourne | Glenelg | SANFL | 0 |
| 2 | 26 | Alister Carr | Essendon | South Bendigo | Bendigo Football League | 0 |
| 2 | 27 | Joel Saunders | Fitzroy | Bairnsdale | Latrobe Valley Football League | 0 |
| 2 | 28 | Jason Gibson | Hawthorn | Deloraine | TFL Statewide League | 0 |
| 3 | 29 | Wayne Campbell | Richmond | Golden Square | Bendigo Football League | 297 |
| 3 | 30 | Glenn Coleman | Footscray | Sydney | AFL | 69 |
| 3 | 31 | Darel Hart | St Kilda | North Adelaide | SANFL | 0 |
| 3 | 32 | Shaun Slater | Richmond | St Arnaud | North Central Football League | 0 |
| 3 | 33 | Shaun Hart | Brisbane Bears | Shepparton United | GVFL | 273 |
| 3 | 34 | Andrew Venner | North Melbourne | Ballarat YCW | BFL | 0 |
| 3 | 35 | Chris Bond | Carlton | North Hobart | TFL Statewide League | 22 |
| 3 | 36 | Rohan Smith | Sydney | Port Adelaide | SANFL | 0 |
| 3 | 37 | Shayne Stevenson | Fitzroy | Sandy Bay | TFL Statewide League | 11 |
| 3 | 38 | Gavin Rose | Collingwood | East Perth | WAFL | 0 |
| 3 | 39 | Peter Cransberg | Essendon | East Perth | WAFL | 79 |
| 3 | 40 | Travis St Clair | Essendon | South Bendigo | Bendigo Football League | 0 |
| 3 | 41 | Chris Waterworth | Richmond | Sandy Bay | TFL Statewide League | 0 |
| 3 | 42 | Matthew Robran | Hawthorn | Norwood | SANFL | 7 |
| 3 | 43 | Chris Guerts | Brisbane Bears | Warragul | Latrobe Valley Football League | 0 |
| 3 | 44 | Jonathan Solomon | Brisbane Bears | Seymour | GVFL | 2 |
| 3 | 45 | Sasha Dyson-Holland | Fitzroy | Leongatha | Latrobe Valley Football League | 0 |
| 3 | 46 | Shane Radbone | Essendon | Sturt | SANFL | 0 |
| 4 | 47 | Richard Gerke | Richmond | Woodville | SANFL | 0 |
| 4 | 48 | Dennis Rapacholi | Footscray | West Perth | WAFL | 0 |
| 4 | 49 | Greg Jones | St Kilda | Swan Districts | WAFL | 2 |
| 4 | 50 | Dean Irving | West Coast | South Fremantle | WAFL | 43 |
| 4 | 51 | Joe Wilson | Brisbane Bears | Wangaratta Rovers | OMNFL | 0 |
| 4 | 52 | Rod Jameson | North Melbourne | Glenelg | SANFL | 0 |
| 4 | 53 | Derek Coghlan | Carlton | Lemnos | GVFL | 0 |
| 4 | 54 | Steven Bozicevic | Sydney | Myrtleford | OMFNL | 0 |
| 4 | 55 | Grant Coffee | Fitzroy | Central District | SANFL | 0 |
| 4 | 56 | Shayne Bennett | Collingwood | North Adelaide | SANFL | 0 |
| 4 | 57 | Tim Moreland | Melbourne | Shepparton | GVFL | 0 |
| 4 | 58 | Jason Dullard | Essendon | Bairnsdale | Latrobe Valley Football League | 0 |
| 4 | 59 | Daniel Frawley | Geelong | Wangaratta | OMNFL | 0 |
| 4 | 60 | Chris Sharp | Hawthorn | East Ballarat | BFL | 0 |
| 5 | 61 | Simon Eastaugh | Richmond | Shepparton | GVFL | 0 |
| 5 | 62 | John Brunner | Footscray | Yarrawonga | OMNFL | 0 |
| 5 | 63 | Wayne Thornborrow | St Kilda | Glenelg | SANFL | 13 |
| 5 | 64 | Tony Evans | West Coast | Claremont | WAFL | 108 |
| 5 | 65 | Alan Schwartz | Essendon | West Torrens | SANFL | 0 |
| 5 | 66 | Shannon Bergmann | North Melbourne | Swan Hill | Central Murray Football League | 0 |
| 5 | 67 | Ben Judd | Carlton | Sturt | SANFL | 0 |
| 5 | 68 | Scott Tomlinson | Sydney | Shepparton United | GVFL | 0 |
| 5 | 69 | Jamie Elliott | Fitzroy | Maryborough | Bendigo Football League | 40 |
| 5 | 70 | Paul Williams | Collingwood | North Hobart | TFL Statewide League | 189 |
| 5 | 71 | Glenn Wilkins | Melbourne | North Hobart | TFL Statewide League | 0 |
| 5 | 72 | Glenn Crawford | Essendon | Barooga | Murray Football League | 0 |
| 5 | 73 | Tim Birthisel | Geelong | Inglewood | Loddon Valley Football League | 0 |
| 5 | 74 | Alistair Burke | Hawthorn | Tatura | GVFL | 0 |
| 6 | 75 | Stephen Pearce | Richmond | Echuca | GVFL | 0 |
| 6 | 76 | Shayne Ward | Footscray | Darley | BFL | 0 |
| 6 | 77 | Christian Lister | St Kilda | Golden Square | Bendigo Football League | 1 |
| 6 | 78 | Stephen Schwerdt | West Coast | Central District | SANFL | 0 |
| 6 | 79 | David Brown | Brisbane Bears | Port Adelaide | SANFL | 0 |
| 6 | 80 | Damien Murray | North Melbourne | West Adelaide | SANFL | 2 |
| 6 | 81 | Sam Gross | Carlton | Boort | North Central Football League | 0 |
| 6 | 82 | Troy Lehmann | Collingwood | North Adelaide | SANFL | 31 |
| 6 | 83 | Mark Robinson | Fitzroy | Glenorchy | TFL Statewide League | 0 |
| 6 | 84 | Matthew Kelly | Collingwood | Norwood | SANFL | 0 |
| 6 | 85 | Anthony Tohill | Melbourne | Swatragh GAC | Ireland | 0 |
| 6 | 86 | Gerrard Harrington | Essendon | Southport Football Club | QAFL | 0 |
| 6 | 87 | Ashley Coutts | Geelong | Kaniva | Kowree-Naracoorte-Tatiara Football League | 0 |
| 6 | 88 | Tim Leng | Hawthorn | Mildura | Sunraysia Football League | 0 |
| 7 | 89 | Jason Smith | Richmond | Lockington Bamawm United | Heathcote District Football League | 1 |
| 7 | 90 | Ben Cross | Footscray | East Warrnambool | Warrnambool District Football League | 0 |
| 7 | 91 | Grant Lawrie | St Kilda | Box Hill | VFA | 17 |
| 7 | 92 | Brett Heady | West Coast | Subiaco | WAFL | 156 |
| 7 | 93 | Tony Paynter | Brisbane Bears | Pakenham | MPNFL | 0 |
| 7 | 94 | John Bingham | North Melbourne | Old Haileyburians | VAFA | 0 |
| 7 | 95 | Jeremy Smith | Carlton | Sandy Bay | TFL Statewide League | 1 |
| 7 | 96 | Gary Stevens | Sydney | Waaia | Picola & District Football League | 5 |
| 7 | 97 | Paul McConville | Fitzroy | Golden Square | Bendigo Football League | 0 |
| 7 | 98 | Kym Russell | Collingwood | Sturt | SANFL | 3 |
| 7 | 99 | Nick Tsiotanis | Essendon | Bulleen-Templestowe | VAFA | 0 |
| 7 | 100 | David Pittman | Essendon | Norwood | SANFL | 0 |
| 7 | 101 | Richard Harrison | Geelong | South Adelaide | SANFL | 0 |
| 7 | 102 | Dion Sheehan | Hawthorn | Mansfield | GVFL | 0 |
| 8 | 103 | Brett Chalmers | Richmond | Port Adelaide | SANFL | 0 |
| 8 | 104 | Tony Trigg | Footscray | Bungaree | Central Highlands Football League | 0 |
| 8 | 105 | Stuart Annand | St Kilda | Redan | BFL | 0 |
| 8 | 106 | Ernie Hug | Collingwood | Sale | Latrobe Valley Football League | 0 |
| 8 | 107 | Sean Valenta | Brisbane Bears | Morningside | QAFL | 0 |
| 8 | 108 | Eric Lissenden | North Melbourne | Neerim-Neerim South | Ellinbank & District Football League | 2 |
| 8 | 109 | Colin Corkery | Carlton | Nemo Rangers GAA | Ireland | 0 |
| 8 | 110 | Craig Budarick | Sydney | Glenelg | SANFL | 0 |
| 8 | 111 | David Noble | Fitzroy | North Hobart | TFL Statewide League | 0 |
| 8 | 112 | Ashley McIntosh | West Coast | Claremont | WAFL | 242 |
| 8 | 113 | Shane Crothers | Geelong | Grovedale | GFL | 4 |
| 8 | 114 | Jason Walscgott | Essendon | West Gambier | Western Border Football League | 0 |
| 8 | 115 | Colm McManamon | Geelong | Burrishoole GAA | Ireland | 0 |
| 8 | 116 | Brendan Bicknall | Hawthorn | Shepparton | GVFL | 0 |

=== Post-draft picks ===
| Pick | Player | Drafted to | Recruited from | League | Games for new club |
|---|---|---|---|---|---|
| 1 | Dean Kemp | West Coast | Subiaco | WAFL | 243 |
| 2 | Tony Begovich | West Coast | Claremont | WAFL | 9 |
| 3 | Brad Gwilliam | West Coast | Claremont | WAFL | 4 |

== 1990 preseason draft ==
| # | Player | Recruited by | Recruited from | Games for new club |
|---|---|---|---|---|
| 1 | David Cloke | Richmond | Collingwood | 43 |
| 2 | Keenan Reynolds | Footscray | Essendon | 74 |
| 3 | Jim Krakouer | St Kilda | North Melbourne | 13 |
| 4 | Craig McGrath | West Coast | Fitzroy | 15 |
| 5 | Brad Edwards | Brisbane Bears | Fitzroy | 10 |
| 6 | Michael Gallagher | North Melbourne | Carlton | 38 |
| 7 | David Williams | Richmond | Melbourne | 0 |
| 8 | Danny Del-Re | Footscray | Williamstown (VFA) | 62 |
| 9 | Tim Pekin | St Kilda | Fitzroy | 112 |
| 10 | Phil Narkle | West Coast | West Coast | 9 |
| 11 | Richard Umbers | Brisbane Bears | Geelong | 4 |
| 12 | Gavin Lloyd | North Melbourne | Darley (RDFL) | 0 |
| 13 | Adrian Bassett | Carlton | Coburg (VFA) | 31 |
| 14 | Michael Kennedy | Sydney | Carlton | 15 |
| 15 | Robert Cummings | Fitzroy | Hawthorn | 1 |
| 16 | Rodney Gladman | Collingwood | East Ballarat (BFL) | 0 |
| 17 | Stuart Cameron | Melbourne | Fitzroy | 5 |
| 18 | Derek Kickett | Essendon | North Melbourne | 77 |
| 19 | Lynton Fitzpatrick | Geelong | Footscray | 0 |
| 20 | Greg Whittlesea | Hawthorn | Sturt (SANFL) | 4 |
| 21 | Chris Martin | Richmond | Hawthorn | 0 |
| 22 | Anthony Alessio | Footscray | Parkside (VAFA) | 0 |
| 23 | Russell Jeffrey | St Kilda | Jerilderie (MFL) | 27 |
| 24 | Warren Dean | West Coast | Melbourne | 0 |
| 25 | Scott Lawton | Brisbane Bears | Brisbane Bears | 0 |
| 26 | Darren Tarczon | North Melbourne | North Melbourne | 0 |
| 27 | Tim Rieniets | Carlton | Coburg (VFA) | 24 |
| 28 | David Wittey | Sydney | Brisbane Bears | 1 |
| 29 | Andrew Johnston | Fitzroy | Essendon | 9 |
| 30 | Darren Kupsch | Collingwood | North Adelaide (SANFL) | 0 |
| 31 | Scott Williamson | Melbourne | Wangaratta Rovers (O&MFL) | 0 |
| 32 | Ian McMullin | Essendon | Old Melbournians (VAFA) | 24 |
| 33 | Bret Bailey | Geelong | Melbourne | 1 |
| 34 | Peter Lodge | Hawthorn | Richmond | 0 |
| 35 | David Sullivan | Richmond | Camberwell (VFA) | 0 |
| 36 | Ian Rickman | Footscray | Williamstown (VFA) | 0 |
| 37 | Glen Kendall | St Kilda | Dromana (MPNFL) | 0 |
| 38 | Bret Hutchinson | West Coast | Subiaco (WAFL) | 0 |
| 39 | David Wearne | Brisbane | Brisbane | 18 |
| 40 | Ken Rainsford | North Melbourne | Port Melbourne (VFA) | 0 |
| 41 | Craig Hucker | Carlton | Carlton | 0 |
| 42 | Robbie Kerr | Sydney | Brunswick (VFA) | 10 |
| 43 | Nick Beardsley | Fitzroy | Hawthorn | 1 |
| 44 | Kane O'Brien | Collingwood | Collingwood | 0 |
| 45 | Robert Hickmott | Melbourne | Essendon | 2 |
| 46 | Neale Daniher | Essendon | Essendon | 7 |
| 47 | Simon Goosey | Geelong | Mornington | 0 |
| 48 | Michael Bawden | Hawthorn | Coorparoo (QAFL) | 0 |
| 49 | Ben Robertson | Carlton | Sydney | 3 |
| 50 | Damien Tresize | Sydney | Golden Square (BFL) | 0 |
| 51 | Mark Athorn | Fitzroy | Footscray | 21 |
| 52 | Dallas Normington | Collingwood | Kyabram (GVFL) | 0 |
| 53 | Mathew Sexton | Melbourne | Sandhurst (BFL) | 0 |
| 54 | Rohan Welsh | Essendon | Essendon | 0 |
| 55 | Michael Garvey | Geelong | Carlton | 0 |
| 56 | Lachlan McLean | Hawthorn | Warrandyte (NFL) | 0 |

== 1990 mid-season draft ==
| # | Player | Recruited by | Recruited from | Games for new club |
|---|---|---|---|---|
| 1 | Laurence Schache | Brisbane Bears | West Torrens (SANFL) | 29 |
| 2 | Dale Lewis | Sydney | North Ballarat | 182 |
| 3 | Mark Brady | Fitzroy | Old Scotch (VAFA) | 0 |
| 4 | Andrew Payze | Richmond | West Torrens (SANFL) | 0 |
| 5 | Tim Williamson | North Melbourne | Casterton (WBFL) | 0 |
| 6 | Craig Cross | Carlton | Burnie Football Club | 0 |
| 7 | Darren Bartsch | Geelong | West Adelaide (SANFL) | 0 |
| 8 | Phil Krakouer | Footscray | North Melbourne | 7 |
| 9 | Steven Cummings | St Kilda | Sandringham (VFA) | 14 |
| 10 | Craig McNaughton | West Coast | Sandhurst | 0 |
| 11 | Damian Stoney | Hawthorn | Old Xaverians (VAFA) | 0 |
| 12 | Jamie Duursma | Melbourne | Melbourne | 0 |
| 13 | Andrew Hardiman | Collingwood | South Warrnambool | 0 |
| 14 | Paul Morrish | Essendon | Richmond | 7 |
| 15 | David Greenhill | Brisbane Bears | Wodonga | 0 |
| 16 | Paul Smit | Sydney | Springvale (VFA) | 0 |
| 17 | Darron Wilkinson | Fitzroy | Camberwell (VFA) | 0 |
| 18 | Scott Turner | Richmond | Ararat | 144 |
| 19 | Anthony Pavey | North Melbourne | Churchill | 0 |
| 20 | Darren Read | Carlton | Dandenong (VFA) | 0 |
| 21 | Luke Hampshire | Geelong | Tyrendarra (VCFL) | 0 |
| 22 | Jamie Grant | Footscray | Daylesford (VCFL) | 5 |
| 23 | Damian Sexton | St Kilda | Yarrawonga (VCFL) | 4 |
| 24 | James Weeding | Hawthorn | Norwood (SANFL) | 0 |
| 25 | Peter Van Der Meer | Melbourne | Frankston | 0 |
| 26 | Stephen Anderson | Collingwood | South Warrnambool (VCFL) | 0 |
| 27 | David Robertson | Essendon | Euroa (VCFL) | 3 |
| 28 | Dean Strauch | Brisbane Bears | Golden Square (VCFL) | 0 |
| 29 | Tim Symes | Sydney | Benalla (VCFL) | 0 |
| 30 | Darren Collins | Fitzroy | Port Melbourne (VFA) | 4 |
| 31 | Damian Hancock | Geelong | Leitchville (VCFL) | 0 |
| 32 | Michael Frost | Footscray | Swan Hill (VCFL) | 13 |
| 33 | Bernie Harris | St Kilda | Terang (VCFL) | 5 |
| 34 | Stephen Moloney | Hawthorn | North Melbourne Old Boys (VAFA) | 0 |
| 35 | Paul Hogarth | Melbourne | Northern United (VCFL) | 0 |
| 36 | Jason Morton | Collingwood | Wagga (NSW) | 0 |
| 37 | Andrew Mills | Essendon | North Shore (NSW) | 0 |
| 38 | Glen Bartlett | Brisbane Bears | East Perth (WAFL) | 0 |
| 39 | Nick Tsiotinas | Footscray | Essendon | 0 |
| 40 | Chris Melican | St Kilda | Glenelg (SANFL) | 0 |
| 41 | Martin Cameron | Hawthorn | Traralgon | 0 |
| 42 | David Morrison | Melbourne | Devonport | 0 |
| 43 | Michael Thomson | Essendon | Richmond | 0 |
| 44 | Barry Spierings | Footscray | Werribee (VFA) | 0 |
| 45 | Jolyon Keeble | Hawthorn | Old Melbournians (VAFA) | 0 |
