= Darren Walsh =

Darren Walsh may refer to:

- Darren Walsh (director) (born 1969), British director, animator and writer
- Darren Walsh (footballer) (born 1984), Australian rules footballer
