= Tim Hazell =

Australian rules footballer (born 1981)

Personal information
- Full name: Tim Hazell
- Born: 13 June 1981 (age 45); Tassie
- Original team: Southern Districts (TFL)
- Draft: 55th, 1999 AFL draft to Hawthorn; 39th, 2003 Rookie Draft to Hawthorn 12th, 2004 Rookie Draft to Adelaide
- Height: 186 cm (6 ft 1 in)
- Weight: 89 kg (196 lb)

Playing career^{1}
Years	Club	Games (Goals)
2000–2003	Hawthorn	5 (3)
2004	Adelaide	0 (0)
- ^{1} Playing statistics correct to the end of 2004.

Career highlights
- VFL premiership player: 2001

Tim Hazell (born 13 June 1981) is a former Australian rules footballer who played with Hawthorn in the Australian Football League (AFL).

Hazell was drafted to Hawthorn from the Southern Districts Football Club in Tasmania with the 55th selection in the 1999 AFL draft. He only played five games for Hawthorn in 2001, before he was delisted, and but re-selected by Hawthorn to their rookie list in the 2003 Rookie Draft. He did not play another senior AFL game, despite being elevated to the Hawthorn senior list at the beginning of the 2003 season and then being selected by Adelaide with the 12th selection in the 2004 Rookie Draft. He was delisted by Adelaide at the end of the 2004 AFL season.

He attended The Hutchins School in Hobart. He has played for Port Melbourne and the Tasmanian Devils Football Club in the Victorian Football League (VFL) and Norwood Football Club in the South Australian National Football League whilst he was on the Adelaide list.
