= Jamie Elliott (footballer, born 1973) =

Australian rules footballer

Personal information
- Full name: Jamie Elliott
- Born: 6 February 1973 (age 53)
- Original team: Maryborough (Ballarat FL)
- Draft: 69th, 1989 VFL draft
- Height: 185 cm (6 ft 1 in)
- Weight: 85 kg (187 lb)

Playing career^{1}
| Years | Club | Games (Goals) |
| 1991–1993 | Fitzroy | 40 (7) |
| 1994–1995 | Richmond | 9 (1) |
| 1996 | St Kilda | 9 (1) |
| Total | | 58 (9) |
- ^{1} Playing statistics correct to the end of 1996.

Jamie Elliott (born 6 February 1973) is a former Australian rules footballer who played with Fitzroy, Richmond and St Kilda in the Australian Football League (AFL) during the 1990s.

Elliott was picked up by Fitzroy in the 1989 VFL draft and broke into the team for the first time in 1991. He was a regular fixture in the team that year but managed only 10 games in 1992. From 14 appearances in 1993 he averaged 16 disposals a game and at the end of the year requested to be released.

He joined Richmond in 1994, having been selected with the third pick of the pre-season draft but would struggle with injuries in his two seasons.

After the 1995 season, Elliott was traded to St Kilda in a swap for Wayne Thornborrow. He played in his club's Ansett Cup winning side but a shoulder injury suffered in the grand final meant he missed the first half of the regular season. In 1997 and 1998 he didn't play a single game and was delisted by St Kilda at the conclusion of the 1998 season.

In 2006 he kicked over 100 goals in a season for the Maryborough Rovers in the MCDFL.

Elliott was appointed coach of Bendigo Football League club Castlemaine in 2008 and remained with them for two seasons.

He returned to Maryborough in 2010, having been named joint coach.
