= Lissenden =

Lissenden may refer to:

- Eric Lissenden, Australian rules footballer
- Lissenden Gardens, area in north London, England
