= Heinz Tonn =

Australian rules footballer

Personal information
- Full name: Heinz Gustav Tonn
- Born: 26 April 1921; Hamburg, Weimar Republic
- Died: 4 April 2003 (aged 81)
- Original team: Golden Square
- Height: 188 cm (6 ft 2 in)
- Weight: 85 kg (187 lb)

Playing career^{1}
Years	Club	Games (Goals)
1947	Fitzroy	6 (2)
- ^{1} Playing statistics correct to the end of 1947.

Heinz Gustav Tonn (26 April 1921 – 4 April 2003) was an Australian rules footballer who played with Fitzroy in the Victorian Football League (VFL).

Tonn, who was born in Germany, served with the Australian Army in World War II.

A follower, Tonn played six games for Fitzroy in the 1947 VFL season.

He returned to his original club, Golden Square in 1948 and won that year's Bendigo Football League award for the best and fairest player. The following season he was appointed captain-coach of Castlemaine and won the award again, for the second season in succession in 1949.
