= Bendigo Gold Football Club =

Bendigo Gold
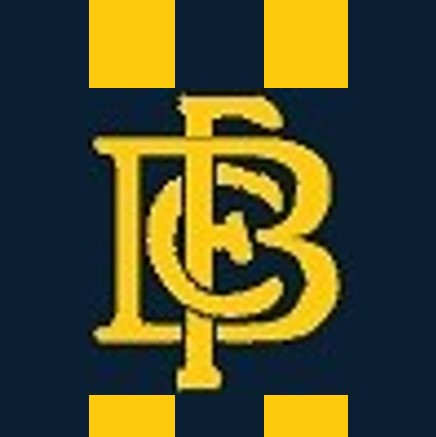

Names
- Full name: Bendigo Diggers Football Club Ltd
- Nickname: Gold
- Former nickname(s): Diggers, Bombers

Club details
- Founded: 1998
- Dissolved: 2014
- Colours: Blue Gold
- Competition: Victorian Football League
- Ground: Queen Elizabeth Oval (18,000); View Street, Bendigo

Uniforms
| Home | Historical |

Bendigo Gold was an Australian rules football club based in Bendigo, Victoria.

The club debuted in the Victorian Football League (VFL) in 1998 as the Bendigo Diggers Football Club, which remained its legal name for the duration of the club's existence despite subsequent nickname changes to the Bombers and then Gold in proceeding seasons. The club disbanded at the conclusion of the 2014 VFL season.

== History ==
The club entered the VFL in 1998 as the Bendigo Diggers. It struggled for on-field success, winning only seven games in its first three seasons, and enduring successive winless seasons in 2001 and 2002.

Starting from 2003 the club formed an affiliation with the Essendon Football Club in the Australian Football League, under which Essendon could field its reserves players in the Bendigo team. The Diggers mascot was changed to the Bendigo Bombers and the guernsey changed to black with a red sash, to match those of the Essendon AFL club. Over the following ten years of the clubs' affiliation, the club played finals five times, with its best finish and sole finals victory coming in 2005, when the club finished fourth. The club also endured another winless season during the affiliation, in 2009.

After the completion of the 2011 season, Essendon announced that the 2012 season would be the last season of affiliation with Bendigo; Essendon fielded a stand-alone reserves team in the VFL from 2013, and Bendigo returned to fielding a stand-alone senior team. To reflect the impending change, the team changed its name to the Bendigo Gold, starting in 2012 (the final season of the clubs' affiliation).

Without access to the professional players or financial support offered by its affiliation with Essendon, Bendigo quickly struggled to remain competitive as a stand-alone club. Bendigo was winless in both 2013 and 2014 – which, when added to the 2001 and 2002 seasons, represented four consecutive winless seasons as a stand-alone club. In June 2014, the club concluded that it was not financially viable in the long term; it consequently disbanded and left the VFL following the 2014 season.

=== Honour board ===
| Year | Finishing position | Coach | Captain/s | Best and Fairest | Leading Goalkicker |
|---|---|---|---|---|---|
| 1998 | 10th | Ross Smith | Ross Smith | Dave Lancaster | |
| 1999 | 11th (Last) | Nathan Bower | Nathan Bower | David Lancaster | |
| 2000 | 18th (Last) | Nathan Bower | Darren Walsh | Nick Carter | |
| 2001 | 16th (Last) | Neville Massina | Darren Walsh | Damien Lock | |
| 2002 | 16th (Last) | Damian Drum | Nick Carter | Nick Carter | |
| 2003 | 10th | Peter Banfield | Nick Carter | Nick Carter | |
| 2004 | 8th | Peter Banfield | Nick Carter | Jordan Doering | |
| 2005 | 4th | Matthew Knights | Nick Carter | Jordan Doering | |
| 2006 | 12th | Matthew Knights | Nick Carter | Ben Jolley | |
| 2007 | 8th | Matthew Knights | Simon Rosa | Kepler Bradley | |
| 2008 | 10th | Adrian Hickmott | James Flaherty | Hayden Skipworth | |
| 2009 | 13th (Last) | Adrian Hickmott | James Flaherty | Paul Scanlon | Darcy Daniher (14) |
| 2010 | 8th | Shannon Grant | James Flaherty | Michael Quinn | |
| 2011 | 7th | Shannon Grant | Ben Duscher / Trent Shinners | Ben Duscher | |
| 2012 | 8th | Hayden Skipworth | Ben Duscher / Trent Shinners | Brendan Lee | Matthew Little (52) |
| 2013 | 14th (Last) | Austinn Jones | Steven Stroobants | Alik Magin | Alik Magin (17) |
| 2014 | 16th (Last) | Austinn Jones | Steven Stroobants | Daniel Toman | Tyrone Downie (31) |
