= Damien Murray =

Damien Murray may refer to:

- Damien Murray (hurler)
- Damien Murray (footballer)
