= Shayne Stevenson =

Shayne Stevenson may refer to:

- Shayne Stevenson (footballer), Australian AFL player
- Shayne Stevenson (ice hockey), Canadian NHL player
