= Duscher =

Duscher is a surname. Notable people with the surname include:

- Aldo Duscher (born 1979), Argentine football manager and former player
- Ben Duscher (born 1987), Australian rules footballer
