= Darrell Wilkins =

Australian rules footballer, born 1915

Personal information
- Full name: Darrell Wilkins
- Born: 1 October 1915
- Died: 1 January 1964 (aged 48)
- Original team: Castlemaine
- Height: 170 cm (5 ft 7 in)
- Weight: 75 kg (165 lb)

Playing career^{1}
| Years | Club | Games (Goals) |
| 1936 | St Kilda | 2 (0) |
- ^{1} Playing statistics correct to the end of 1936.

Darrell Wilkins (1 October 1915 – 1 January 1964) was an Australian rules footballer who played with St Kilda in the Victorian Football League (VFL).
