= Nick Carter (footballer) =

Australian rules footballer

Personal information
- Full name: Nick Carter
- Born: 28 April 1978 (age 48)
- Original teams: Golden Square, Bendigo Pioneers
- Draft: 20th overall, 1995 AFL draft
- Height: 179 cm (5 ft 10 in)
- Weight: 86 kg (190 lb)
- Position: Midfielder

Playing career^{1}
Years	Club	Games (Goals)
1996	Fitzroy	17 (4)
1997–1998	Brisbane Lions	5 (1)
1999	Melbourne	3 (1)
Total		25 (6)
- ^{1} Playing statistics correct to the end of 1999.

Career highlights
- AFL Rising Star nominee: 1996

Nick Carter (born 28 April 1978) is a former Australian rules football player. During his career Carter played for Fitzroy, Brisbane and Melbourne in the Australian Football League (AFL).

== Early life ==
Carter began playing football for Golden Square as a junior. He then played for the Bendigo Pioneers in the TAC Cup. Carter played for the Victorian Country team at the 1995 AFL Under 18 Championships.

== AFL career ==
=== Fitzroy ===
Carter was drafted by Fitzroy Football Club with the 20th selection in the 1995 AFL draft, with coach Michael Nunan stating the club was looking for "players with pace and finish to play in the midfield". Carter had an impressive first AFL season, debuting in round 6 and remaining in the senior team for the rest of the season, playing 17 matches. He was nominated for the 1996 AFL Rising Star award in round 8. Despite a good season personally, Fitzroy struggled both on the field, winning only one match for the whole season, and financially. Fitzroy's administrator at the time negotiated a deal with Brisbane Bears whereby at the end of the 1996 season, Fitzroy's AFL operations were taken over by the Bears, to form the Brisbane Lions.

=== Brisbane ===
Only eight Fitzroy players became Brisbane Lions players, with the majority of the team coming from the Brisbane Bears list. Carter, however, was one of those eight players. In his two seasons with Brisbane, Carter only managed to play five games, struggling to break into the senior side of a team with what Martin Blake described as "the best depth in the competition".

=== Melbourne ===
After struggling to gain a spot in the Brisbane senior team, Carter was traded to Melbourne at the end of the 1998 season for the 45th draft pick in the 1998 AFL draft. Carter only managed three games for the Demons and he was delisted at the end of the 1999 season. Carter nominated for the 1999 AFL draft, but he was not selected, thereby ending his AFL career.

== Post-AFL career ==
After failing to be picked up in the 1999 Draft, Carter began playing with the Bendigo Diggers in the Victorian Football League (VFL). He played for Bendigo for eight seasons and was captain and assistant coach of the club during that time. In 2003 Carter was Bendigo's best and fairest player for the season, his third win of the award in four seasons. Carter also regularly represented the VFL when playing against other state leagues, such as the SANFL and the WAFL.

Carter is currently the coach of the Golden Square Football Club, the club he played junior football for.

== Honours ==
Carter was named captain of the Bendigo Team of the Decade. Bendigo's best and fairest award is named the Carter Medal, in honour of his contributions to the club. He became the first Bendigo player to play 100 games for the club.
