= Greg Jones (Australian footballer) =

Australian rules footballer

Personal information
- Full name: Greg Jones
- Born: 20 February 1970 (age 56)
- Original teams: Swan Districts, (WAFL)
- Draft: St Kilda: No. 49, 1989 VFL Draft Footscray: No. 6, 1992 Pre-season Draft

Playing career^{1}
| Years | Club | Games (Goals) |
| 1991 | St Kilda | 2 (0) |
- ^{1} Playing statistics correct to the end of 1991.

Greg Jones (born 20 February 1970) is a former Australian rules footballer who played for St Kilda in the Australian Football League (AFL) in 1991. He was recruited from the Swan Districts Football Club in the West Australian Football League (WAFL) with the 49th selection in the 1989 VFL Draft.
