= Jim Wilson (Australian footballer) =

Australian rules footballer (1930–2021)

"Jimmy" Harry Lachlan Wilson
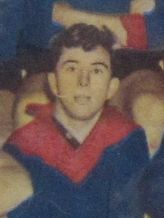

Personal information
- Full name: Harry Lachlan Wilson
- Born: 4 August 1930
- Died: 14 July 2021 (aged 90); Bendigo, Australia
- Original team: Golden Square
- Height: 163 cm (5 ft 4 in)
- Weight: 59 kg (130 lb)
- Position: Rover

Playing career^{1}
Years	Club	Games (Goals)
1952–1953	Melbourne	17 (16)
- ^{1} Playing statistics correct to the end of 1953.

Harry "Jimmy" Lachlan Wilson (4 August 1930 – 14 July 2021) was an Australian rules footballer who played with Melbourne in the Victorian Football League (VFL).

Wilson came down to Melbourne after winning the Bendigo Football League's Michelsen Medal in 1951, playing for Golden Square.

Wilson played 15 games and kicked 14 goals in the 1952 VFL season and made just two more appearances, the following season.

Wilson won Melbourne's best first year player in 1952 and then trained with South Melbourne in early 1954.

Wilson played with Rochester in 1955.

Wilson died in Bendigo on 14 July 2021, at the age of 90.

== Links ==
- Jim Wilson Profile at Demonwiki
- Jim Wilson Stats at AFL Tables
