= Wayne Thornborrow =

Australian rules footballer (born 1972)

Personal information
- Full name: Wayne Thornborrow
- Born: 27 December 1972 (age 53)
- Original team: Glenelg (SANFL)
- Draft: No. 63, 1989 National Draft
- Height: 198 cm (6 ft 6 in)
- Weight: 90 kg (198 lb)

Playing career^{1}
Years	Club	Games (Goals)
1991–1992 & 1997-1998	Glenelg	41 (33)
1994–1995	St Kilda	13 (10)
Total		54 (43)
- ^{1} Playing statistics correct to the end of 1998.

Wayne Thornborrow (born 27 December 1972) is a former Australian rules footballer who played with St Kilda in the Australian Football League (AFL) and Glenelg in the South Australian National Football League (SANFL).

Thornborrow was initially drafted by St Kilda in the 1989 National Draft, but the Glenelg recruit remained in South Australia and didn't play in the AFL until 1994. He played 13 games for St Kilda, in two seasons, then went to Richmond, which had traded Jamie Elliott for him. Thornborrow returned to Glenelg without playing senior football for Richmond.
