= Jack Showell =

Australian rules footballer, born 1915

Personal information
- Full name: Jack Showell
- Born: 7 February 1915
- Died: 13 December 1989 (aged 74)
- Original team: Castlemaine
- Height: 179 cm (5 ft 10 in)
- Weight: 81 kg (179 lb)

Playing career^{1}
Years	Club	Games (Goals)
1937–38	St Kilda	23 (0)
- ^{1} Playing statistics correct to the end of 1938.

Jack Showell (7 February 1915 – 13 December 1989) was an Australian rules footballer who played with St Kilda Football Club in the Victorian Football League (VFL).
