= Les Bogie =

Australian rules footballer, born 1911

Personal information
- Full name: Leslie William Bogie
- Born: 2 May 1911; Castlemaine, Victoria
- Died: 14 November 1983 (aged 72); Castlemaine, Victoria
- Original team: Castlemaine
- Height: 174 cm (5 ft 9 in)
- Weight: 63 kg (139 lb)

Playing career^{1}
Years	Club	Games (Goals)
1934–36	Footscray	25 (4)
- ^{1} Playing statistics correct to the end of 1936.

Leslie William Bogie (2 May 1911 – 14 November 1983) was an Australian rules footballer who played with Footscray in the Victorian Football League (VFL).

== Family ==
The son of William Smith Bogie (1882–1970), and Maud Alice Bogie (1885–1963), née Robins, Leslie William Bogie was born at Castlemaine, Victoria on 2 May 1911.

He married Rita Alice Askew (1918–2013) on 11 January 1941.

== Death ==
He died at Castlemaine, Victoria on 14 November 1983.
