= Stephen Edgar (footballer) =

Australian rules footballer

Personal information
- Full name: Stephen Edgar
- Born: 1 February 1967 (age 59)
- Original team: East Fremantle
- Draft: 7th overall, 1989 National draft
- Height: 175 cm (5 ft 9 in)
- Weight: 76 kg (168 lb)
- Position: Back pocket

Playing career^{1}
Years	Club	Games (Goals)
1990–1991	Carlton	14 (1)
- ^{1} Playing statistics correct to the end of 1991.

Career highlights
- WAFL premiership player, 1994

Stephen Edgar (born 1 February 1967) is a former Australian rules footballer who played with Carlton in the Australian Football League (AFL). Drafted from West Australian Football League (WAFL) team East Fremantle in 1989, Edgar played 14 games for Carlton in the two years he was at the club. After being delisted, Edgar moved back to his former team, East Fremantle, and won a WAFL premiership with the side in 1994, after replacing Jason Sherriff in the team after breaking his thumb and missing the Preliminary Final.
