= Bob Curtayne =

Australian rules footballer

Personal information
- Full name: Robert William Curtayne
- Born: 29 March 1894; Chewton, Victoria
- Died: 29 May 1970 (aged 76); Heidelberg, Victoria
- Original team: Castlemaine

Playing career^{1}
Years	Club	Games (Goals)
1920–21	St Kilda	23 (1)
- ^{1} Playing statistics correct to the end of 1921.

Robert William Curtayne (29 March 1894 – 29 May 1970) was an Australian rules footballer who played with St Kilda in the Victorian Football League (VFL).
