= Paul Starbuck =

Australian rules footballer

Personal information
- Full name: Paul Starbuck
- Born: 16 April 1967 (age 59)
- Original team: Castlemaine / Carlton
- Height: 185 cm (6 ft 1 in)
- Weight: 85 kg (187 lb)

Playing career^{1}
Years	Club	Games (Goals)
1990	Sydney Swans	1 (0)
- ^{1} Playing statistics correct to the end of 1990.

Paul Starbuck (born 16 April 1967) is a former Australian rules footballer who played with the Sydney Swans in the Australian Football League (AFL).

Starbuck played many reserves matches for Carlton, including a premiership in 1987, before getting his chance to play senior football. When he finally made his league debut he was at a new club, Sydney, having been selected in the 1989 VFL Draft. His appearance against Fitzroy in the 12th round of the 1990 AFL season was his only AFL game. He had 11 disposals.
