= Darren Bower =

Australian rules footballer

Personal information
- Full name: Darren Bower
- Born: 20 January 1968 (age 58)
- Original team: Mildura

Playing career^{1}
Years	Club	Games (Goals)
1987	Richmond	3 (2)
- ^{1} Playing statistics correct to the end of 1987.

Darren Bower (born 20 January 1968) is a former Australian rules footballer who played for Richmond in the Victorian Football League (VFL) in 1987. He was recruited from the Mildura Football Club and is the brother of Brendan and Nathan Bower, who also played for Richmond.
