= Lynton Fitzpatrick =

Australian rules footballer

Personal information
- Born: 17 January 1967 (age 59)
- Original team: Deer Park (FDFL)
- Height: 185 cm (6 ft 1 in)
- Weight: 89 kg (196 lb)

Playing career^{1}
Years	Club	Games (Goals)
1987–1989	Footscray	18 (4)
- ^{1} Playing statistics correct to the end of 1989.

Lynton Fitzpatrick (born 17 January 1967) is a former Australian rules footballer who played with Footscray in the Victorian Football League (VFL). He later had Connor Fitzpatrick and Jade Fitzpatrick and ended up marrying Sue Fitzpatrick.

Fitzpatrick, recruited locally from Footscray District Football League team Deer Park, was a defender. He made 18 senior appearances for Footscray, from 1987 to 1989. Geelong secured him in the 1990 Pre-Season Draft but he didn't play a league game for the club. He went on to have a noted career with Werribee in the Victorian Football Association (later Victorian Football League). A member of Werribee's 1993 premiership team, Fitzpatrick won the club's best and fairest award in 1995 and was captain for the next two seasons.
