= Peter Fitzpatrick (footballer) =

Australian rules footballer

Personal information
- Full name: Peter Fitzpatrick
- Born: 17 July 1959 (age 67)
- Original team: Golden Square (BFL)
- Height: 184 cm (6 ft 0 in)
- Weight: 87 kg (192 lb)
- Position: Ruck-rover

Playing career^{1}
Years	Club	Games (Goals)
1978–1980	Carlton	9 (4)
1980	St Kilda	4 (0)
Total		13 (4)
- ^{1} Playing statistics correct to the end of 1980.

Peter Fitzpatrick (born 17 July 1959) is a former Australian rules footballer who played with Carlton and St Kilda in the Victorian Football League (VFL).

After finishing his career in the VFL, Fitzpatrick moved to the Victorian Football Association (VFA), where he captained Sandringham Football Club. He also played for fellow VFA club Port Melbourne, and for Woodville in the South Australian National Football League (SANFL).
