= Fred Burge =

Australian rules footballer (1923–2018)

- Burge with Richmond

Personal information
- Full name: Frederick Charles Burge
- Born: 6 September 1923
- Died: 6 November 2018 (aged 95); Melbourne, Australia
- Original team: Castlemaine
- Height: 174 cm (5 ft 9 in)
- Weight: 75 kg (165 lb)

Playing career^{1}
Years	Club	Games (Goals)
1942–1950	Richmond	118 (105)
- ^{1} Playing statistics correct to the end of 1950.

Frederick Charles Burge (6 September 1923 – 6 November 2018) was an Australian rules footballer who played for Richmond in the Victorian Football League (VFL).

Burge, who arrived from Castlemaine, played in two grand finals early in his career, despite not being a regular member of the side. He was on a forward pocket in the 1942 VFL Grand Final, his sixth league game and started from the same position in the 1944 Grand Final, which was just his 15th appearance for Richmond. His side lost on both occasions.

He had his breakthrough year in 1945, kicking 55 goals from his 20 appearances, which made him Richmond's leading goal-kicker for the season. A rover, he played with the club until the 1951 pre-season, when he suffered a serious knee injury in practice. He died on 6 November 2018 at the age of 95 at a hospital in Melbourne.
