= Troy Clarke (Australian rules footballer) =

Australian rules footballer and coach

Personal information
- Born: 8 June 1969
- Died: 28 October 2013 (aged 44)
- Original team: South Cairns
- Height: 173 cm (5 ft 8 in)
- Weight: 74 kg (163 lb)

Playing career^{1}
Years	Club	Games (Goals)
1987–1990	West Torrens	64
1991–1996	Brisbane Bears	68 (31)
- ^{1} Playing statistics correct to the end of 1996.

Career highlights
- Brisbane Bears reserves premiership 1991

Troy Clarke (8 June 1969 – 28 October 2013) was an Australian rules footballer who played with the Brisbane Bears in the Australian Football League (AFL) during the 1990s. He is a member of the Queensland Football Hall of Fame.

== Career ==
=== Early career ===
Clarke represented Queensland at interstate football from junior level and was just 17 when he won the Crathern Medal with South Cairns as the "best and fairest" player in the 1986 AFL Cairns season.

=== West Torrens ===
In 1987, he joined South Australian National Football League club West Torrens and spent his four seasons playing mostly as a wingman. He was selected in the 1989 "West End All Stars Team of the Year".

=== Brisbane Bears ===
Despite not making onto the Brisbane Bears list when they joined the competition in 1987, Clarke's efforts in South Australia saw him signed by the club in 1991. He participated in their reserves premiership that year and also represented Queensland in a State of Origin win over Victoria. Small, fast and versatile, Clarke was used in many positions by Brisbane and received 12 Brownlow Medal votes during his career. An injury sustained in 1995 meant he had to undergo a knee reconstruction which ultimately ended his AFL career.

=== Coaching ===
Clarke took over from Lance Spaulding as coach of Sandy Bay for the 1997 TFL Statewide League season in Tasmania. The following season he took over as coach of the newly formed Southern Cats.

== Death ==
Clarke died from coronary atherosclerosis on 28 October 2013, aged 44.
