= Bret Hutchinson =

Australian rules footballer

Personal information
- Full name: Bret Hutchinson
- Born: 6 March 1964 (age 62)
- Draft: 38th pick, 1990 Pre-season Draft
- Height: 178 cm (5 ft 10 in)
- Weight: 73 kg (161 lb)

Playing career^{1}
Years	Club	Games (Goals)
1985	Melbourne	1 (0)
1986	Frankston	unknown
1987–93	Subiaco	105 (44)
- ^{1} Playing statistics correct to the end of 1993.

Career highlights
- Melbourne under-19 premiership side 1983; Melbourne reserves premiership side 1984; Melbourne reserves best and fairest 1985; Subiaco Best First Year Player 1987; Subiaco premiership side 1988

Bret Hutchinson (born 6 March 1964) is a former Australian rules footballer who played with the Melbourne Football Club in the Victorian Football League (VFL) and the Subiaco Football Club in the West Australian Football League (WAFL).

Zoned to Melbourne, Hutchinson played both under-19 and reserves football with the club between 1982 and 1984, playing in premiership sides in both 1983 (under-19s) and 1984 (reserves). He played his sole senior game for the game in round 15 of the 1985 VFL season, against Footscray at the Western Oval, recording 12 disposals. He was unable to play the following week after his face was splashed with battery acid from his car, causing chemical burns. Hutchinson did not play another senior game for the club, although he won the reserves best and fairest award in 1985, and transferred to the Frankston Football Club in the Victorian Football Association (VFA) for the 1986 season.

In 1987, Hutchinson again transferred clubs, moving to Subiaco in the WAFL (based in Perth, Western Australia), and won the club's Best First Year Player award. As a result of his form in the WAFL over the following seasons, including playing in Subiaco's premiership side in 1988, he was drafted by the West Coast Eagles in the VFL with the 38th pick in the 1990 Pre-season Draft. Hutchinson did not play a senior game for West Coast, and left Subiaco at the end of the 1993 season, having played 105 games and kicked 44 goals for the club.
