= Arthur Cummins =

Australian rules footballer

Personal information
- Full name: Arthur Edward Cummins
- Born: 19 August 1876; Castlemaine, Victoria
- Died: 5 December 1911 (aged 35); Fitzroy, Victoria
- Original team: Castlemaine

Playing career^{1}
Years	Club	Games (Goals)
1897	Carlton	7 (1)
- ^{1} Playing statistics correct to the end of 1897.

Arthur Edward Cummins (19 August 1876 – 5 December 1911) was an Australian rules footballer who played for the Carlton Football Club in the Victorian Football League (VFL). He has the unique record of his entire career consisting of seven consecutive matches against seven different opponents at seven different venues.
