= Darren Denneman =

Australian rules footballer

Personal information
- Full name: Darren Denneman
- Born: 23 March 1968 (age 58)
- Original team: Ocean Grove
- Height: 185 cm (6 ft 1 in)
- Weight: 80 kg (176 lb)

Playing career^{1}
Years	Club	Games (Goals)
1988	Geelong	4 (0)
1990	Sydney Swans	3 (0)
Total		7 (0)
- ^{1} Playing statistics correct to the end of 1990.

Darren Denneman (born 23 March 1968) is a former Australian rules footballer who played with Geelong and the Sydney Swans in the Victorian/Australian Football League (VFL/AFL).

Denneman was recruited locally by Geelong, from Ocean Grove. He made four appearances in the 1988 VFL season but didn't feature at all in 1989. Sydney acquired him in the 1989 VFL Draft and he played three games for them in 1990.

He now works for AFL NSW/ACT.
