= Southern Cats =

Names
- Full name: Southern Districts Football Club
- Nickname(s): Cats
- Club song: We're the pride of Southern Districts

Club details
- Founded: November 1997
- Dissolved: 31 May 1999
- Colours
- Competition: Tasmanian Football League
- Ground(s): North Hobart Oval (capacity: 18,000)
- Huonville Recreation Ground (capacity: 11,000)

Uniforms
Home	Away

The Southern Districts Football Club, also known as the Southern Cats, was an Australian rules football club based in North Hobart, Tasmania, Australia.

== Club history ==
The Southern Cats were formed under the guise of Project 2000, a brainchild of key football people from the Sandy Bay, Channel and Kingston Football Clubs in order to establish a football club to compete in the Kingborough and Huon region of southern Tasmania in the TFL Statewide League.

After a TFL-driven attempted merger between North Hobart, Hobart and Sandy Bay Football Clubs was overwhelmingly rejected by both North Hobart and Hobart financial members, the Sandy Bay Football Club, which had already announced that it would be going out of business in its own right at the end of the 1997 TFL season was left with no other option but to close down, arrangements were put in place to establish the new club and play games out of both North Hobart Oval and Huonville Recreation Ground, 35 kilometres south of Hobart to try to entice supporters from the Huon and Kingborough region into supporting a representative team from that region at the highest level of the sport within Tasmania.

After the 1997 TFL season had ended Hobart, South Launceston and Launceston all pulled out of the competition in favour of returning to regional football due to their already dire financial situations and the continually escalating costs of involvement with statewide football.

With New Norfolk also in deep financial trouble and the expectation that they too would also face exclusion from the TFL on both financial and geographical grounds, it was greatly surprising to many in the football public when TFL Chief Commissioner Michael Kent announced in late 1997 that New Norfolk were to be retained and that a new club (Southern Districts) were to be admitted to the statewide competition in 1998.

The Southern Cats were able to garner most of their players from the recently defunct Sandy Bay team and also were able to draw players from Hobart (who had entered the SFL) as well as other players from the Huon and Kingborough region, the club was presided over by former Kingston Football Club president and prominent businessman in the region, Denis Fuller.

The club's first match was at North Hobart Oval on 5 April 1998 when they lost to North Hobart by 5-points, they lost their first six TFL matches before recording a 134-point victory over New Norfolk at North Hobart Oval on 23 May, kicking their club record score and highest winning margin in the process.

After recording only two victories by round 12, the Cats then went on to record victories over Glenorchy, New Norfolk, North Hobart and Clarence to edge out Glenorchy by four premiership points and take fifth spot on the ladder at season's end to compete in the finals in their maiden season of football, the excitement was short-lived as dual reigning premier Clarence outclassed the Cats all day in the Elimination Final to win by 59-points.

Despite the general feeling of optimism at the on-field performance of the Southern Cats during their first season, their off-field position was not as strong, the club had no notable home base from which to generate revenue, had a supporter base which consisted largely of former Sandy Bay supporters and had failed to sway many supporters from the Kingborough and Huon region into supporting the club and had finished up with $80,000 of debt in 1998 with an average home attendance of just 1,055 spectators.

The 1999 season began optimistically for Southern Districts, in the pre-season the club won its only piece of silverware by taking out the Coca-Cola Challenge, however by the early part of the season the vultures were circling on the club as crowd numbers began to sink as rumours of financial problems and discontent within the club began to surface.

The Cats home match on 29 May, which ultimately was to be the club's final match, saw just 447 people attend to see Southern Districts defeat Devonport by 95-points at North Hobart Oval.

Two days later, on 31 May 1999 a meeting was convened by the Southern Districts Football Club and Football Tasmania whereby the club dropped a bombshell by announcing it would immediately cease operations after just 27 matches with debts of more than $100,000 which were continuing to increase (the League itself had a combined debt of $1.86 million at the time) and an average home of attendance for the season of only 864 people.

== History ==
- Home Ground – North Hobart Oval (1998–1999) & Huonville Recreation Ground (1998–1999)
- Established – 1997
- Playing Colours – White with Navy Blue hoops
- Emblem – Cats
- Club Theme Song – "We're the pride of Southern Districts!" (Tune: "Marine Hymn")
- Affiliations – TFL Statewide League & TSFL (1998–1999)
- Matches Played – 27 (8-19-0)

== Senior Best and Fairest winners ==
- 1998 – Scott Webster
- 1999 – Not Awarded

== Senior Coaches ==
- 1998 – Troy Clarke
- 1999 – Troy Clarke

== Senior Captains ==
- 1998 – Shayne Stevenson
- 1999 – Shayne Stevenson

== Club President ==
- 1998 – Denis Fuller
- 1999 – Denis Fuller

== Club Record Finals Match Attendance ==
- 2,243 – Southern Districts v Clarence at North Hobart Oval on 29 August 1998

== Club Record Roster Match Attendance ==
- 2,251 – Southern Districts v Burnie Dockers at West Park Oval on 18 April 1998

== Club Record Home Attendance ==
- 2,038 – Southern Districts v Glenorchy at Huonville Recreation Ground on 17 May 1998

== Club Record Score ==
- 27.20 (182) – Southern Districts v New Norfolk 6.12 (48) at North Hobart Oval on 23 May 1998
