= Ross Ousley =

Australian rules footballer

Personal information
- Full name: Ross Gregory Ousley
- Born: 3 March 1937; Newbridge, Victoria
- Died: 14 May 1993 (aged 56); Melbourne
- Original team: Golden Square
- Height: 183 cm (6 ft 0 in)
- Weight: 80.5 kg (177 lb)

Playing career^{1}
Years	Club	Games (Goals)
1956–58	Carlton	23 (15)
1959–60	Port Melbourne (VFA)	10 (6)
1961–68	Northcote (VFA)	26 (27)
- ^{1} Playing statistics correct to the end of 1958.

Ross Gregory Ousley (3 March 1937 – 14 May 1993) was an Australian rules footballer who played with Carlton in the Victorian Football League (VFL).
