= Jim May (Australian footballer) =

Australian rules footballer (1910–1979)

Personal information
- Full name: James Walter May
- Born: 15 April 1910; Wycheproof, Victoria
- Died: 24 November 1979 (aged 69); Caulfield South, Victoria
- Original team: Golden Square (BFL)
- Height: 188 cm (6 ft 2 in)
- Weight: 87 kg (192 lb)

Playing career^{1}
Years	Club	Games (Goals)
1940–41	Footscray	6 (3)
- ^{1} Playing statistics correct to the end of 1941.

James Walter May (15 April 1910 – 24 November 1979) was an Australian rules footballer who played with Footscray in the Victorian Football League (VFL).

He later served in the Royal Australian Air Force during the final years of World War II.
