= Ray Bower =

Australian rules footballer

Personal information
- Full name: Raymond John Bower
- Born: 5 January 1923
- Died: 16 May 1995 (aged 72)
- Original team: Castlemaine
- Height: 171 cm (5 ft 7 in)
- Weight: 68 kg (150 lb)

Playing career^{1}
Years	Club	Games (Goals)
1944–45	Richmond	13 (8)
1946–47	Essendon	10 (1)
1948, 52, 57	Port Melb (VFA)	21 (14)
Total		44 (23)
- ^{1} Playing statistics correct to the end of 1947.

Raymond John Bower (5 January 1923 – 16 May 1995) was an Australian rules footballer who played with Richmond and Essendon in the Victorian Football League (VFL).
