= Robert Thompson (Australian footballer, born 1947) =

Australian rules footballer

Personal information
- Full name: Robert W. Thompson
- Born: 19 June 1947 (age 79)
- Original team: Castlemaine
- Height: 174 cm (5 ft 9 in)
- Weight: 75 kg (165 lb)
- Positions: Back pocket, rover

Playing career^{1}
Years	Club	Games (Goals)
1967–71	Essendon	8 (0)
- ^{1} Playing statistics correct to the end of 1971.

Robert W. "Bob" Thompson (born 19 June 1947) is a former Australian rules footballer who played with Essendon in the Victorian Football League (VFL). While with Essendon he won a reserves premiership in 1968. After leaving the Bombers, he played with Subiaco in the West Australian Football League (WAFL), Preston in the Victorian Football Association (VFA) and then returned to his original team, Castlemaine. He was later an assistant coach of Essendon's under-19s and coached Essendon Grammar Old Boys.
