= Brian McMillan (footballer) =

Australian rules footballer (1941–2011)

Personal information
- Full name: Brian McMillan
- Born: 16 January 1941
- Died: 18 April 2011 (aged 70)
- Original team: Castlemaine
- Height: 178 cm (5 ft 10 in)
- Weight: 83 kg (183 lb)

Playing career^{1}
Years	Club	Games (Goals)
1962–64	Richmond	22 (6)
1965	Dandenong	13 (10)
- ^{1} Playing statistics correct to the end of 1964.

Career highlights
- 1962 VFL Night Premiership

Brian McMillan (16 January 1941 – 18 April 2011) was a former Australian rules footballer who played with Richmond in the Victorian Football League (VFL).
