= Nick Beardsley =

Australian rules footballer

Personal information
- Full name: Nicholas Beardsley
- Born: 23 September 1969 (age 57)
- Original team: East Camberwell
- Draft: No. 43, 1990 Preseason Draft

Playing career^{1}
Years	Club	Games (Goals)
1990	Fitzroy	1 (0)
- ^{1} Playing statistics correct to the end of 1990.

Nick Beardsley (born 23 September 1969) is a former Australian rules footballer who played for Fitzroy in the Australian Football League (AFL) in 1990. He was recruited from the East Camberwell Football Club to Hawthorn in 1986, but did not play a senior game for them. He was then drafted by Fitzroy with the 43rd selection in the 1990 Preseason Draft.
