= Robert Kerr (Australian footballer) =

Australian rules footballer

Personal information
- Full name: Robert Kerr
- Born: 19 March 1967 (age 59)
- Original team: Corpus Christie
- Height: 180 cm (5 ft 11 in)
- Weight: 83 kg (183 lb)

Playing career^{1}
Years	Club	Games (Goals)
1987–1988	North Melbourne	6 (0)
1990–1991	Sydney Swans	10 (2)
Total		16 (2)
- ^{1} Playing statistics correct to the end of 1991.

Robert "Robbie" Kerr (born 19 March 1967) is a former Australian rules footballer who played with North Melbourne and the Sydney Swans in the Australian Football League (AFL).

Kerr was recruited to North Melbourne from Corpus Christie. He made three appearances for North Melbourne in both the 1987 and 1988 seasons.

After playing for Brunswick in 1989, Kerr was picked up by Sydney in the 1990 Pre-Season Draft.
