= Norm McPherson =

Australian rules footballer

Personal information
- Full name: Norman John McPherson
- Born: 25 August 1907; Bendigo, Victoria
- Died: 24 May 1976 (aged 68); Bendigo, Victoria
- Original team: Castlemaine

Playing career^{1}
| Years | Club | Games (Goals) |
| 1931–1932 | South Melbourne | 9 (0) |
- ^{1} Playing statistics correct to the end of 1932.

Norman John McPherson (25 August 1907 – 24 May 1976) was an Australian rules footballer who played with South Melbourne in the Victorian Football League (VFL).
