= Allister Scott =

Australian rules footballer

Personal information
- Full name: Allister John Scott
- Born: 24 June 1971 (age 55)
- Original team: Scotch College
- Draft: No. 13, 1989 VFL Draft
- Height: 191 cm (6 ft 3 in)
- Weight: 88 kg (194 lb)

Playing career^{1}
Years	Club	Games (Goals)
1990–1993	Richmond	19 (10)
- ^{1} Playing statistics correct to the end of 1993.

Allister John Scott (born 24 June 1971) is a former Australian rules footballer who played with Richmond in the Australian Football League (AFL).

Scott played his early football at Inverloch-Kongwak and Scotch College.

He was selected by Richmond with pick 13 in the 1989 VFL Draft.

In his four-season career at Richmond, Scott played 19 senior AFL games. He kicked all of his nine career goals in the 1991 season.
