= Castlemaine Football Club =

Castlemaine

Names
- Full name: Castlemaine Football Netball Club
- Nickname: Magpies

2025 season
- After finals: N/A
- Home-and-away season: 7th (3 wins/7 losses)
- Leading goalkicker: Michael Hartley (17)
- Best and fairest: Bailey Henderson

Club details
- Founded: 1859; 167 years ago
- Colours: Black and White
- Competition: Bendigo Football League (BFL)
- Coach: Bailey Henderson
- Premierships: BFL: 4 (1926, 1952, 1992, 2000)
- Ground: Camp Reserve, Castlemaine (capacity: 7,000)

Uniforms
Home

Other information
- Official website: castlemainefnc.com.au

The Castlemaine Football Netball Club, nicknamed The Magpies, is an Australian rules football and netball club based in Castlemaine, Victoria, Australia and is currently a member of the Bendigo Football League.

The club is notable for several reasons. Formed in 1859, it is the second oldest documented football club in Australia after the Melbourne Football Club and it has produced many notable Australian rules footballers.

== History ==
=== Foundation ===
The first recorded football match on the Camp Reserve was in September 1855 between a team of Army soldiers and a team of goldminers. The "Castlemaine Football Club" was formed on 15 June 1859 at the Supreme Court Hotel, Castlemaine and chaired by T Butterworth with reference from an article in the Castlemaine Mail newspaper Castlemaine played its first match on 22 June 1859 on the Cricket Ground Barkers Creek.

Records for the foundation date was discovered in 2007 which rewrote history; as many had previously believed that the Geelong Football Club had been formed earlier.

=== Competition ===
The club was formed in an era before codified rules organised competition, but according to some sources, including Graeme Atkinson, "football" was popular in the goldfields region; and, without a league to participate in, the club was an irregular competitor during its first decade.

Timeline

- 1877 - 1879: Victorian Football Association
- 1889 - 1899: Castlemaine District Football Association
- 1900 - 1909: CFC in recess
- 1910 - 1913: Castlemaine District Football Association
- 1914 - 1924: Castlemaine District Football League
- 1925 - 1930: Bendigo Football League
- 1931 - Midland District Football League
- 1932 - 1938: Bendigo Football League
- 1939 - 1948: Castlemaine District Football League
- 1949 - 2019: Bendigo Football League

=== Uniform ===
The original uniform was a white cap with royal-blue Maltese cross.

=== 1925 ===
In 1925, Castlemaine joined the Bendigo Football League, coached by the West Australian champion Phil Matson, Castlemaine made the 1925 Grand Final, but lost to South Bendigo by 14 Points: 7.12 (54) to 6.4 (40).

=== Tragedy ===
In June 1953, Castlemaine footballer, Ian Brown accidentally received a knock to his head in an inter-league match between Bendigo Football League and Ballarat Football League and died in the Ballarat Hospital the following day.

== Football Premierships ==
Seniors

- Castlemaine District Football Association
  - 1895
  - 1897 - Castlemaine: 4.3 - 27 d Newstead: 2.4 - 16
  - 1915 - Castlemaine: 3.3 - 21 d Maldon: 1.12 - 18
- Castlemaine Wednesday Football Association
  - 1904
  - 1909

Bendigo Football League

- 1926 - Castlemaine: 13.18 - 96 d Sandhurst: 8.16 - 64
- 1952 - Castlemaine: 15.9 - 99 v Sandhurst: 9.16 - 70
- 1992 - Castlemaine: 14.13 - 97 d Golden Square: 14.8 - 92
- 2000 - Castlemaine: 12.11 - 83 d Kangaroo Flat: 9.17 - 71

Reserves

- 1956, 1981, 1996,

Thirds

- 1960, 1965,

== Alumni ==
=== Castlemaine players in the VFL/AFL ===
The following 47 footballers played with Castlemaine FC, prior to playing senior football in the VFL/AFL, and / or were drafted, with the year indicating their VFL/AFL debut. Not 100 percent sure if Jack Titus actually played with Castlemaine FC.

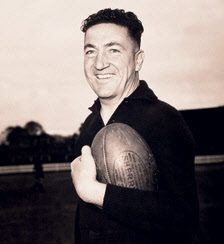
Percy Bentley

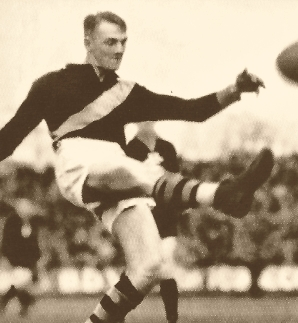
Jack Titus

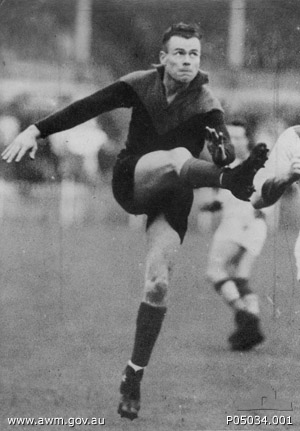
Ron Barassi Senior

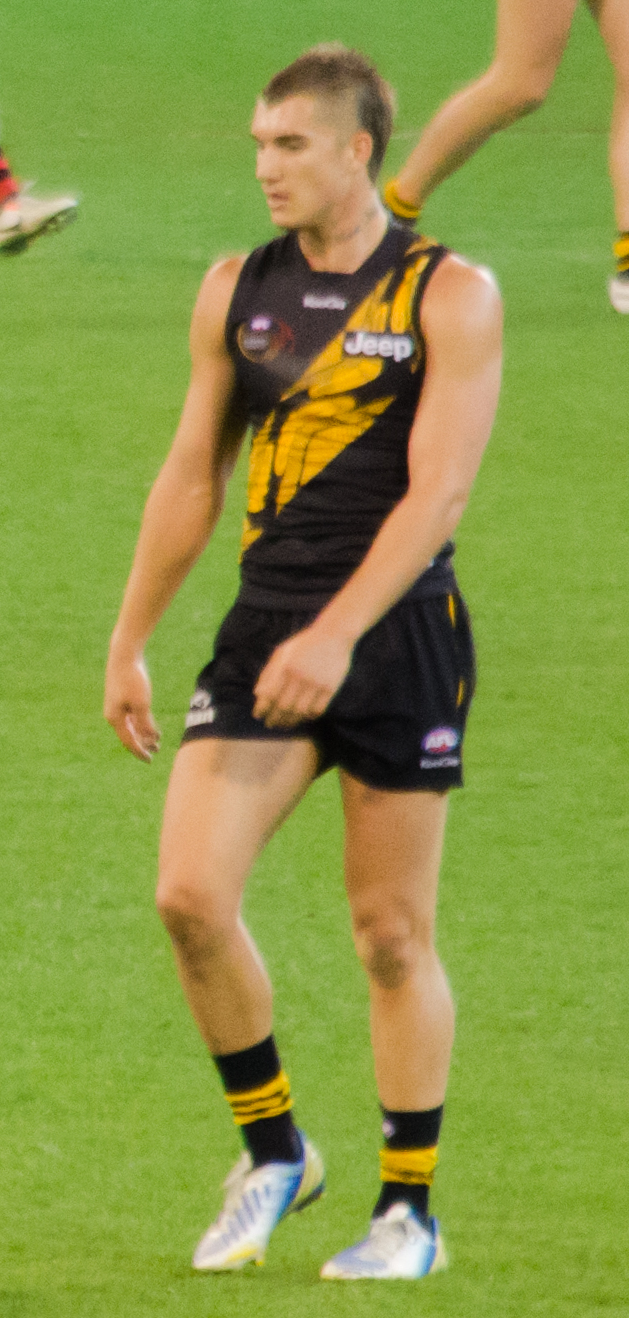
Dustin Martin

Player	VFL/AFL Clubs	VFL/AFL Career	Notes/References
Arthur Cummins	Carlton	1897	
John Everard	Essendon	1905	
Bill Sewart	Essendon	1905-15	1911 & 1912 VFL Premierships
Len Bowe	Essendon	1907-15	1911 & 1912 VFL Premierships
Bill Johnson	Essendon, Carlton	1907-12	1908 VFL Grand Finalist
Norm Oliver	Collingwood	1909-11	1910 VFL Premiership
Gil Ebbott	St Kilda	1911	
Victor Jackson	Collingwood	1912	
Bob Curtayne	St Kilda	1920-21	
Frank Gleeson	St Kilda	1920	
Percy Bentley	Richmond, Carlton	1925–40	1932, 1934 VFL Premierships
Jack Titus	Richmond	1926–43	1932, 1934 VFL Premierships
Jack Fincher	Richmond, Footscray	1927-33	1927-28-29 VFL Grand Finalist
Bert Smedley	St Kilda	1928-29	
Harry Crapper	Melbourne	1930–31	
Norm McPherson	South Melbourne	1931-2	
Matt Carland	Essendon, Footscray	1932 & 38	
Les Bogie	Footscray	1934-36	
David Wilkie	Essendon	1934	
Ron Barassi, Sr.	Melbourne	1936–40	1940 VFL Premiership
Ron McCann	Collingwood	1936	1936 Stawell Gift winner
Darrell Wilkins	St Kilda	1936	
Jack Showell	St Kilda	1936-38	
Arthur Sanger	Carlton	1938-47	1945 VFL Premiership
Fred Burge	Richmond	1942-50	1942 & 1944 VFL Grand Finalist
Bert Harper	Essendon	1943-52	1946 & 1950 VFL Premierships
Ray Bower	Richmond, Essendon	1944-47	
Jeff Patterson	South Melbourne	1951-54	
Vin Williams	Fitzroy	1952-59	
Graham Minihan	St Kilda	1953–59	
Bud Annand	St Kilda	1956–62	
Brian McMillan	Richmond	1962–64	1962 VFL Night Premiership
Kevin Delmenico	Footscray	1966–70	
Robert Thompson	Essendon	1968–71	1968 VFL Reserves Premiership
Peter Hall	Carlton	1971	
Peter Fyffe	Carlton	1970–73	
Mark Cross	Footscray	1974	
Warren Jones	Carlton, St Kilda	1978–85	1982 VFL Premiership
Lazar Vidovic	St Kilda	1989–97	
Rod Keogh	Melbourne, St Kilda	1990–98	1997 AFL Grand Finalist
Adrian Bassett	Carlton	1990-92	
Paul Starbuck	Sydney, Carlton	1990	
Steven Oliver	Carlton	1992–94	
Tom Kavanagh	Melbourne, Fitzroy	1993–94	
Heath Culpitt	Carlton	1999–2001	
Dustin Martin	Richmond	2010–24	2017, 2019, 2020 AFL Premierships
Kane Farrell	Port Adelaide	2018-	
