= Graham Minihan =

Australian rules footballer

Personal information
- Full name: Graham Minihan
- Born: 9 September 1934
- Died: 29 September 1991 (aged 57)
- Original team: Castlemaine
- Height: 170 cm (5 ft 7 in)
- Weight: 70 kg (154 lb)
- Position: Wing

Playing career^{1}
Years	Club	Games (Goals)
1953–59	St Kilda	77 (32)
- ^{1} Playing statistics correct to the end of 1959.

Graham Minihan (9 September 1934 – 29 September 1991) was a former Australian rules footballer who played with St Kilda in the Victorian Football League (VFL).
