= Jonathan Solomon =

Australian rules footballer

Personal information
- Full name: Jonathan Solomon
- Born: 14 November 1967 (age 58)
- Original team: Seymour
- Draft: 44th, 1989 VFL draft
- Height: 195 cm (6 ft 5 in)
- Weight: 95 kg (209 lb)

Playing career^{1}
Years	Club	Games (Goals)
1990	Brisbane Bears	2 (1)
- ^{1} Playing statistics correct to the end of 1990.

Jonathan Solomon (born 14 November 1967) is a former Australian rules footballer who played with the Brisbane Bears in the Australian Football League (AFL).

Solomon came from Seymour in country Victoria and came to Brisbane after being selected with the 44th pick of the 1989 VFL draft.

He played just two AFL games for the Bears, both in the 1990 AFL season. On his debut against Collingwood at Carrara he kicked a goal and had seven disposals. He appeared again the following round, when Brisbane met Carlton at Princes Park.
