= Nathan Bower =

Australian rules footballer

Personal information
- Full name: Nathan Bower
- Born: 8 June 1972 (age 54)
- Original team: Mildura
- Draft: 15th, 1989 VFL draft
- Height: 185 cm (6 ft 1 in)
- Weight: 80 kg (176 lb)

Playing career^{1}
Years	Club	Games (Goals)
1991–1998	Richmond	74 (22)
- ^{1} Playing statistics correct to the end of 1998.

Nathan Bower (born 8 June 1972) is a former Australian rules footballer who played with Richmond in the Australian Football League (AFL) during the 1990s.

Bower was one of three brothers from Mildura to play for Richmond, with Brendan and Darren Bower the others. He was picked up early in the 1989 VFL draft, for the 15th selection and was used at Richmond as a wingman, half back and tagger.

In 1993 he averaged 14.82 disposals but played just half the season. Only once, in 1995, did Bower play a full year in the seniors and his 20 games included three finals where he put in some decent performances.

Bower joined the Bendigo Diggers in 1999 as captain-coach, after being delisted by Richmond.
