= Jason Smith (Australian rules footballer) =

Australian rules footballer

Personal information
- Full name: Jason Smith
- Born: 13 August 1972 (age 54)
- Original team: Lockington
- Draft: No. 89, 1989 National Draft
- Height: 185 cm (6 ft 1 in)
- Weight: 80 kg (176 lb)

Playing career^{1}
Years	Club	Games (Goals)
1991	Richmond	1 (0)
- ^{1} Playing statistics correct to the end of 1991.

Jason Smith (born 13 August 1972) is a former Australian rules footballer who played with Richmond in the Australian Football League (AFL).

Smith was originally from Lockington and attended Assumption College, before being selected in the 1989 National Draft. He played in the opening round of the 1991 AFL season, against St Kilda at Waverley Park. It was his only senior appearance. He was a reserves player at Carlton in 1994.
