= Brad Tunbridge =

Australian rules footballer

Personal information
- Full name: Brad Tunbridge
- Born: 26 January 1964 (age 62)
- Original team: East Fremantle
- Draft: 8th, 1989 VFL draft
- Height: 195 cm (6 ft 5 in)
- Weight: 93 kg (205 lb)
- Position: Ruckman

Playing career^{1}
Years	Club	Games (Goals)
1990–1993	Sydney Swans	50 (17)
- ^{1} Playing statistics correct to the end of 1993.

Brad Tunbridge (born 26 January 1964) is a former Australian rules footballer who played with the Sydney Swans in the Australian Football League (AFL) during the 1990s.

Tunbridge was already 26 when he made his AFL debut, having started his career in the WAFL playing for East Fremantle.

A ruckman, he struggled with a back injury in his first season but performed well in the ruck in 1991 and 1992.

He had 293 hit-outs in 1992, the third most in the league. That season he also took 107 marks and finished as Sydney's equal best vote getter with Dale Lewis in the Brownlow Medal count with eight.
