= Bud Annand =

Australian rules footballer

Personal information
- Full name: Baden-Powell Annand
- Nickname: Bud
- Born: 18 June 1933
- Died: 10 April 1996 (aged 62)
- Original team: Castlemaine
- Height: 189 cm (6 ft 2 in)
- Weight: 91 kg (201 lb)
- Position: Follower

Playing career^{1}
Years	Club	Games (Goals)
1956–1962	St Kilda	106 (11)
- ^{1} Playing statistics correct to the end of 1962.

Baden-Powell "Bud" Annand (18 June 1933 – 10 April 1996) was an Australian rules footballer who played for the St Kilda Football Club in the Victorian Football League (VFL).

== VFL career ==
Annand was a reliable follower who played for St Kilda from 1956 to 1962, amassing 106 games and 11 goals. Annand joined the Saints from Castlemaine and became one of the most famous products from the club. After his final season, which possibly the best of his career, as he polled three Brownlow Medal votes, Annand left the Saints to coach Redan in the Ballarat Football League.

== Personal life ==
As the VFL was not fully professional at the time, Annand had a career as a police officer. As he rose up through the ranks of the Police Force, Annand was transferred throughout country Victoria. Annand spent four years at Redan before moving into the Western District and coaching in the Hampden Football League.

Bud was married to Heather Annand. One of their sons, David, born in 1968, was a contestant on the third season of The Mole where he was the seventh (out of twelve) contestant eliminated.
