= Christian Lister =

Australian rules footballer

Personal information
- Full name: Christian Lister
- Born: 14 July 1968 (age 58)
- Original teams: Golden Square, (Bendigo)
- Draft: No. 77, 1989 VFL Draft

Playing career^{1}
Years	Club	Games (Goals)
1990	St Kilda	1 (0)
- ^{1} Playing statistics correct to the end of 1990.

Christian Dale Lister (born 14 July 1968) is a former Australian rules footballer who played for St Kilda in the Australian Football League (AFL) in 1990. He was recruited from the Golden Square Football Club in the Bendigo Football League (BFL) with the 77th selection in the 1989 VFL Draft.
