= Rod Gladman =

Australian rules footballer

Personal information
- Full name: Rodney Gladman
- Born: 19 February 1968 (age 58)
- Original team: East Ballarat
- Height: 180 cm (5 ft 11 in)
- Weight: 81 kg (179 lb)

Playing career^{1}
Years	Club	Games (Goals)
1987	St Kilda	1 (0)
1990	Collingwood	0 (0)
- ^{1} Playing statistics correct to the end of 1987.

Rodney "Rod" Gladman (born 19 February 1968) is a former Australian rules footballer who played with St Kilda in the Victorian Football League (VFL).

Gladman spent most of his career with East Ballarat in the Ballarat Football League (BFL), but made one VFL appearance for St Kilda in the 1987 season, their round 14 loss to Geelong at Kardinia Park. He was picked up in the 1990 Pre-Season Draft by Collingwood, where he played only in the reserves.

He continued to play for East Ballarat after his stints in the VFL and was the BFL Leading Goal-kicker in 1992, with 61 goals.

From 1995 to 1997, Gladman coached Hepburn in the Central Highlands Football League (CHFL). He went back to East Ballarat in 1998 and won a club best and fairest. His next coaching appointment was at Creswick, which he led from 2000 to 2004, then Gordon, in 2005 and 2006. He joined a fourth CHFL club, Illabarook, for the 2012 season, but resigned during their 2013 campaign, after 29 successive losses.
