= Kym Russell =

Australian rules footballer

Personal information
- Full name: Kym Russell
- Born: 11 April 1968 (age 58)
- Original team: Sturt (SANFL
- Draft: 98th, 1989 VFL Draft
- Height: 180 cm (5 ft 11 in)
- Weight: 78 kg (172 lb)

Playing career^{1}
Years	Club	Games (Goals)
1991	Collingwood	3 (1)
- ^{1} Playing statistics correct to the end of 1991.

Kym Russell (born 11 April 1968) is a former Australian rules footballer who played with Collingwood in the Australian Football League (AFL).

Russell came to Collingwood from Sturt (South Australian National Football League (SANFL) club Sturt, with the 98th selection of the 1989 VFL Draft. He broke into the senior side for the first time midway through the 1991 AFL season and made three appearances for the reigning premiers. His younger brother, Scott Russell, was a teammate in each of those games.

Back in South Australia, Russell went on to play a total of 170 SANFL matches, 130 with Sturt and the other 40 for Norwood.

He was CEO of West Adelaide from 2009 to 2013.
