= Eric Lissenden =

Australian rules footballer

Personal information
- Full name: Eric Lissenden
- Born: 1 January 1972 (age 54)
- Original team: Neerim-Neerim South
- Draft: No. 108, 1989 National Draft; No. 65 1995 National Draft
- Height: 193 cm (6 ft 4 in)
- Weight: 90 kg (198 lb)

Playing career^{1}
| Years | Club | Games (Goals) |
| 1996 | North Melbourne | 2 (1) |
- ^{1} Playing statistics correct to the end of 1996.

Eric Lissenden (born 1 January 1972) is a former Australian rules footballer who played with North Melbourne in the Australian Football League (AFL).

Lissenden first came to North Melbourne via the 1989 National Draft, from Neerim-Neerim South. He was a key position forward and finished as the leading goalkicker in the Under 19s league for the 1990 season but didn't get to make a senior appearance. He instead made his way to Essendon, in the 1992 Mid-Season Draft. At Essendon he also failed to appear at AFL level but was given a second chance by North Melbourne in the 1995 National Draft, while playing for Warragul Industrials. He finally made his AFL debut in round 14 of the 1996 season in a win over Carlton at the Melbourne Cricket Ground and played his only other senior game the following round against Collingwood.
