= Frank Gleeson =

Australian rules footballer

Personal information
- Full name: Francis Victor Gleeson
- Born: 25 September 1897; Kyneton, Victoria
- Died: 12 June 1923 (aged 25); East Melbourne, Victoria
- Original team: Castlemaine

Playing career^{1}
Years	Club	Games (Goals)
1920	St Kilda	1 (0)
- ^{1} Playing statistics correct to the end of 1920.

Francis Victor Gleeson (25 September 1897 – 12 June 1923) was an Australian rules footballer who played with St Kilda in the Victorian Football League (VFL).
