= Gavin Keane =

Australian rules footballer

Personal information
- Full name: Gavin Keane
- Nickname: Marbles
- Born: 5 March 1966 (age 60)
- Original team: St Bernard's
- Height: 180 cm (5 ft 11 in)
- Weight: 76 kg (168 lb)

Playing career^{1}
Years	Club	Games (Goals)
1987–1988	Essendon	29 (18)
1990	Brisbane Bears	7 (0)
Total		36 (18)
- ^{1} Playing statistics correct to the end of 1990.

Gavin Keane (born 5 March 1966) is a former Australian rules footballer who played with Essendon and the Brisbane Bears in the Victorian/Australian Football League (VFL/AFL).

Keane, who was recruited from St Bernard's, averaged just under 20 disposals from 16 appearances in 1987, his first league season. He added another 13 games in 1988 but didn't play VFL football in 1989.

Traded to Brisbane at the end of the 1989 season, Keane played seven games at his new club in 1990, all losses.

A wingman, he also spent some time in the Victorian Football Association playing with Williamstown.
