= Adrian Bassett =

Australian rules footballer

Personal information
- Full name: Adrian Bassett
- Born: 11 March 1967 (age 59)
- Original team: Southport/Coburg
- Draft: No. 13, 1990 Pre-Season draft
- Height: 186 cm (6 ft 1 in)
- Weight: 81 kg (179 lb)
- Position: Defender

Playing career^{1}
Years	Club	Games (Goals)
1990–1992	Carlton	31 (12)
- ^{1} Playing statistics correct to the end of 1992.

Adrian Bassett (born 11 March 1967) is a former Australian rules footballer who played for the Carlton Football Club in the Australian Football League (AFL).
