= Ben Duscher =

Australian rules footballer

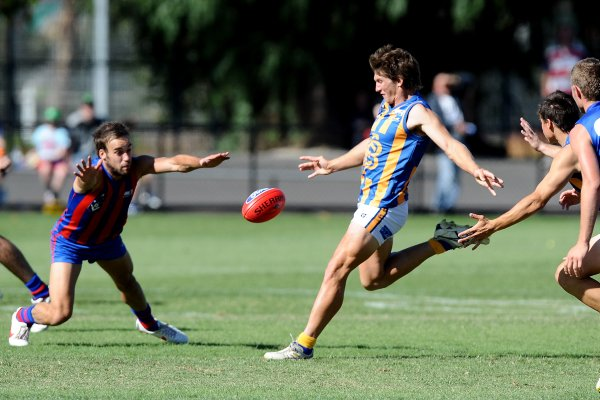
- Duscher as captain of Bendigo Gold; Football Club during 2012 season

Personal information
- Born: 29 September 1987 (age 39)
- Original team: Merbein Football Netball Club
- Height: 186 cm (6 ft 1 in)
- Weight: 90 kg (198 lb)

Playing career
- Bendigo Bombers; Bendigo Gold; Essendon VFL Football Club 2013 VFL 16 games 17 goals 2012 VFL 12 games 8 goals 2011 VFL 14 games 15 goals 2010 VFL 9 games 13 goals

Career highlights
- Premierships: Premiership with Balranald 2006; Premiership with Rochester 2008; Premiership Werrimull 2012 Club champion awards: Best First year player Bendigo Bombers 2010; Carter medal club best & fairest Bendigo Bombers 2011, Runner-up Carter medal best &fairest Bendigo Gold 2012, Best and Fairest Essendon VFL 2013 Representative selection: 2011 VCFL/VFL/AFL Young Guns; 2012 VFL State Squad

Ben Duscher (born 29 September 1987) is an Australian rules footballer; he was co-captain for the Bendigo Bombers in the Victorian Football League (VFL) in 2011; co-captain of Bendigo Gold VFL team in 2012 and was elected by his peers as co-captain of the Essendon VFL Football Club in 2013. At the commencement of the 2012 season he was rated number four amongst the players in the Victorian Football League (VFL). Mid 2013 season Ben was rated number 3 amongst the top 50 VFL players by Football Nation. Ben won the Carter medal for club champion (best and fairest) at the Bendigo Bombers in 2011 and was runner-up (for Bendigo Gold) in 2012. He won the Essendon VFL Best and Fairest in 2013.

== Junior career ==
Ben played with Merbein in the Sunraysia Football League, Mildura and the Bendigo Pioneers in the TAC Cup in 2005. In 2005 he was selected in the Victoria Country squad alongside Joel Selwood, Scott Pendlebury, Dale Thomas (footballer) and Shaun Higgins. Ben played in the Balranald Premiership winning team in the Central Murray Football League in 2006 In 2008 Ben played in the Goulburn Valley Football League (GVFL) where he was in the Rochester premiership winning team.

== Victorian Football League- major individual achievements ==
=== Treble captaincy ===
Ben has been co-captain of three VFL teams- the Bendigo Bombers VFL team (2011), the Bendigo Gold VFL team (2012) and the Essendon VFL team (2013).

=== Club champion ===
Ben won the Carter medal for best and fairest at the Bendigo Bombers in 2011, despite missing five games through injury. He'd won the award for best first year player in 2010. In 2012 for Bendigo Gold, Ben (185 votes) was runner up to Lee (190 votes) in the Best & Fairest, Bendigo Gold general manager Graham Pratt stating: "Because of injury, Ben played in [only] 12 VFL games, but he polled in 11 of them.". Ben won Best and Fairest for Essendon VFL in 2013.

=== VFL representative teams ===
Ben was selected for the 2011 VCFL/VFL/AFL Young Guns Game at TEAC Oval, Port Melbourne, on Sunday 18 September, as a curtain raiser to the VFL Senior Preliminary Final. Duscher was selected for the 32-man VFL State Squad for its game against the Tasmanian State side on Saturday 26 May 2012, but not in the final 22.

=== AFL Draft Combine ===
Ben was selected for the 2011 AFL draft combine and achieved an impressive 28/30 in the kicking efficiency test (players face away from 20m, 30m and 40m distant targets to left and right (two-meter wide circles), receive a ball, turn and, at a moment's notice, aim as directed) in the NAB AFL Draft Combine, but narrowly missed AFL drafting in 2011

=== Individual achievement in Bendigo Gold 2012 season ===
In the opening game of the 2012 season Duscher scored three goals and was amongst the best for Bendigo in its 20.17 (137) to 7.11 (53) defeat of the Frankston Dolphins. Bendigo coach Hayden Skipworth stated that Duscher "was fantastic, particularly early in the game, and he kicked three goals himself. There's no question in my mind he has what it takes to be on an AFL list." After playing three rounds of football in the 2012 season Duscher led the tallies for kicks (54, 15 from next), handballs (24, one from next), disposals (78, 19 from next), contested possessions (38, 10 from next) and tackles (22, 2 from next). The following week he was among the best on ground (with 29 disposals and a goal) in Bendigo's (18.14.122) win over Williamstown (15.13.103) Duscher being said to demonstrate how he can "play inside congestion, can split out into space as well as anyone in the VFL." Duscher was named amongst the best afield in Bendigo's 76 point win over Coburg on 10 June 2012. Duscher was also named amongst the best and kicked a goal in Bendigo's (14.16.100) win over Box Hill Hawks (9.14.68) on 16 June 2012, in a side with fifteen Essendon Football Club AFL senior and rookie-listed players. After returning from injury Duscher was amongst the best two on ground in the last two games of the season. At the end of the 2012 season Ben took time off his work as a carpenter to train with the Western Bulldogs; but after being told they preferred to draft players with established AFL records, Ben initially announced his intention to captain the young Bendigo Gold side in 2013.

=== Individual achievement with Essendon VFL Team ===
In 2013 Ben as well as being elected co-captain by his peers, Ben, as a recognition of his skill and experience, was contracted to roles with the Essendon VFL Football Club as a midfield assistant coach and in development-coaching. Ben was noted to be amongst the best on ground in the loss to Casey Scorpions on 20 April 2013. Ben was listed as best on ground for his club in the Essendon VFL (17.11.113) loss to Collingwood VFL (18.14.122) on 25 May 2013. Ben was listed best on ground for his club in Essendon's (13.10.88) loss to Geelong Cats (18.18.126) on 1 June 2013. Ben was listed as best on ground for his club in Essendon's (21.17.143) win over Sandringham (12.9.81) on 8 June 2013. He was named amongst the best on ground in Essendon's (6.9.45) loss to Williamstown (15.11.101) on 16 June 2013. He was named amongst the best in Essendon's (18.10.113) win over Northern Blues (6.13.49) on 7 July. Mid-season Ben was rated number 3 amongst the top 50 VFL players by Football Nation. Ben scored a goal and was named amongst the best in Essendon's (9.15.69) win over Casey Scorpions (9.4.58) on 21 July 2013. Ben kicked 3 goals and was named amongst the best in Essendon's (21.19.145) win over Bendigo FC (5.6.36) on 27 July 2013. Ben scored 5 goals and was best on ground (described as 'tearing the game apart') in Essendon's (16.12.108) win over Sandringham (9.11.65) on 3 August 2103. Ben was named amongst the best in Essendon's (18.15.123) win over Frankston (7.10.64) on 17 August 2013. Ben kicked two goals and was listed amongst the best in Essendon's (18.17.125) win over North Ballarat (13.8.86) on 23 August 2013. Ben won Best and Fairest for Essendon VFL in 2013.

== Regional notability and 2012 Millewa Football League premiership ==
Ben's nominated home team is Merbein in the Sunraysia Football League, where his older brothers Brad and Mark play. On 12 May 2012 the three brothers played together for the first time (when Bendigo FC had a VFL bye); Ben being dominant in the midfield with over 40 disposals and three goals in a 25.18 (168) to 10.14 (74) win over Nangiloc. On 8 September 2012, Werrimull (20.23 (143)) beat Gol Gol (4.5 (29)) in the Grand Final of the Millewa Football League with Ben, Mark and Brad Duscher being listed amongst the best on ground.
