= Golden Square Football Club =

Golden Square

Names
- Full name: Golden Square Football & Netball Club
- Nickname(s): Bulldogs

2024 season

Club details
- Founded: 1932; 93 years ago
- Colours
- Competition: Bendigo Football League
- Premierships: BFL (18) 1938, 1939, 1945, 1964, 1965, 1972, 1975, 1976, 1979, 1988, 1989, 2001, 2009, 2010, 2011, 2012, 2013, 2023
- Ground(s): Wade Street Oval, Golden Square

Uniforms
Home

Other information
- Official website: gsfnclub.com.au

The Golden Square Football Netball Club, nicknamed the Bulldogs, is an Australian rules football and netball club based in the Bendigo suburb of Golden Square, Victoria.

The club teams currently compete in the Bendigo Football Netball League. The senior football squad has participated in the league since 1935.

Former club full forward, Ron Best holds the Bendigo Football Netball League record for most recorded league goals.

== Football Premierships ==
Seniors

- Bendigo Football League (18)
  - 1938, 1939, 1945, 1964, 1965, 1972, 1975, 1976, 1979, 1988, 1989, 2001, 2009, 2010, 2011, 2012, 2013, 2023

Reserves

- ?

Thirds

- ?

== VFL / AFL players ==
The following footballers played with Golden Square prior to playing senior VFL / AFL football or were drafted, with the year indicating their VFL / AFL debut.

- 1901 - Robert Daykin
- 1940 - Jim May
- 1947 - Heinz Tonn
- 1952 - Jim Wilson
- 1956 - Ross Ousley
- 1962 - Des Dickson
- 1973 - Ray Byrne
- 1977 - Tony Southcombe
- 1978 - Peter Fitzpatrick
- 1978 - Peter McConville
- 1983 - Ricky Nixon
- 1984 - Greg Williams
- 1986 - Dean Strauch
- 1987 - Michael Gallagher
- 1990 - Christian Lister
- 1991 - Wayne Campbell
- 1994 - Rowan Warfe
- 1996 - Nick Carter
- 1997 - Nathan Brown
- 2002 - Rick Ladson
- 2019 - Jye Caldwell
- 2021 - Jack Ginnivan
