= Damien Murray (footballer) =

Australian rules footballer

Personal information
- Full name: Damien Murray
- Born: 6 December 1970 (age 55)
- Original team: West Adelaide (SANFL)
- Draft: No. 80, 1989 National Draft
- Height: 199 cm (6 ft 6 in)
- Weight: 81 kg (179 lb)

Playing career^{1}
Years	Club	Games (Goals)
1991	North Melbourne	2 (0)
- ^{1} Playing statistics correct to the end of 1991.

Damien Murray (born 6 December 1970) is a former Australian rules footballer who played with North Melbourne in the Australian Football League (AFL).

Originally from South Australian National Football League club West Adelaide, Murray was drafted by North Melbourne with pick 80 in the 1989 National Draft.

Murray made his senior AFL debut against the Brisbane Bears in Round Two of the 1991 AFL season. His next match, against Essendon in round three, would prove to be his final match.
