= Michael Gallagher (Australian footballer) =

Australian rules footballer

Personal information
- Full name: Michael Gallagher
- Born: 9 May 1966 (age 60)
- Original team: Golden Square (BFL)
- Height: 196 cm (6 ft 5 in)
- Weight: 86 kg (190 lb)
- Position: Ruck/Forward

Playing career^{1}
Years	Club	Games (Goals)
1987–1989	Carlton	16 (17)
1990–1992	North Melbourne	38 (6)
Total		54 (23)
- ^{1} Playing statistics correct to the end of 1992.

Michael Gallagher (born 9 May 1966) is a former Australian rules footballer who played with Carlton and North Melbourne in the Australian Football League (AFL).
