= Shayne Stevenson (footballer) =

Australian rules footballer

Personal information
- Full name: Shayne Stevenson
- Born: 12 June 1970 (age 56)
- Original team: Sandy Bay
- Draft: 37th overall, 1989 VFL draft
- Height: 179 cm (5 ft 10 in)
- Weight: 81 kg (179 lb)

Playing career^{1}
Years	Club	Games (Goals)
1991–93	Fitzroy	11 (9)
1994–97	Hawthorn	34 (30)
Total		45 (39)
- ^{1} Playing statistics correct to the end of 1997.

Shayne Stevenson (born 12 June 1970) is a former Australian rules footballer who played with Fitzroy and Hawthorn in the Australian Football League (AFL) during the 1990s.

A long kicking left footer, Stevenson joined the AFL from Tasmanian club Sandy Bay. He was recruited with the 37th pick in the draft and made his debut in the 1991 season. In his three years playing seniors at Fitzroy, Stevenson never once experienced a win.

His first season with Hawthorn, who picked him up in the 1994 Pre-Season Draft, was a contrast. He made his way into the team late in the year and participated in the Qualifying Final loss to North Melbourne, contributing 23 disposals and two goals.

Stevenson kicked a memorial goal at Waverley in Round 11 1995. Late into the match against Sydney an injured Stevenson was sent back into the field because of a spate of injuries, he hobbled to the forward pocket, the Hawks forced the ball forward and it bounce away from the back of a pack to Stevenson who then managed to dribble it through for a goal. He was later diagnosed to have a broken ankle and Stevenson missed the rest of the season.

Returning to Tasmania after his AFL career ended, Stevenson captained Southern Districts Cats in their brief, 27-game stint in Tasmanian Football League football before they folded in May 1999. Stevenson then crossed to Glenorchy and was a member of their 1999 premiership team. He replaced Paul Hamilton as Glenorchy coach in 2000 and served as general manager.

Stevenson, who went on to work with AFL Tasmania, is now Hawthorn's Tasmanian operations manager.
