= 1997 TFL Statewide League season =

- Teams: Burnie Dockers; Clarence Kangaroos; Devonport Power; Glenorchy Magpies; Hobart Tigers; Launceston Raiders; New Norfolk Eagles; North Hobart Demons; North Launceston Robins; Sandy Bay Seagulls; South Launceston Bulldogs
- Premiers: Clarence
- Minor premiers: Burnie Dockers; 1st minor premiership

Attendance
- Matches played: 105
- Total attendance: 128,183 (1,221 per match)

The 1997 TFL Statewide League premiership season was an Australian rules football competition, staged across Tasmania, Australia over twenty roster rounds and six finals series matches between 12 April and 20 September 1997.

This was the twelfth season of statewide football and the League was known as the Cascade-Boags Draught Super League under a dual commercial naming-rights sponsorship agreement with both Cascade Brewery in Hobart and Boag's Brewery in Launceston.

At the conclusion of this season four clubs left the competition owing to severe financial problems.

Hobart, in debt to the tune of $450,000, were already advised by TFL executives that they would not be granted a renewed licence to continue on in the TFL after this season and decided to join the SFL from 1998, both South Launceston and Launceston continued to find onfield success minimal and were also servicing large debts that looked likely to continue to grow and promptly pulled out of the competition and rejoined the NTFL from 1998 whilst Sandy Bay, unable to find a merger partner, was wound up at season's end and became defunct.

== Participating Clubs ==
- Burnie Dockers Football Club
- Clarence District Football Club
- Devonport Football Club
- Glenorchy District Football Club
- Hobart Football Club
- Launceston Football Club
- New Norfolk District Football Club
- North Hobart Football Club
- North Launceston Football Club
- Sandy Bay Football Club
- South Launceston Football Club

=== 1997 TFL Statewide League Club Coaches ===
- Peter German (Burnie Dockers)
- Grant Fagan (Clarence)
- Max Brown (Devonport Power)
- Paul Hamilton (Glenorchy)
- Gary Williamson (Hobart)
- Michael Lockman (Launceston)
- Rod Grinter (New Norfolk)
- John McCarthy (North Hobart)
- Wes Lewis (North Launceston)
- Troy Clarke (Sandy Bay)
- Peter Curran (South Launceston)

=== TFL Statewide League Reserves Grand Final ===
- Nth Launceston 10.17 (77) v Burnie Dockers 10.9 (69) – North Hobart Oval

=== TFL Statewide League Colts (Under-19's) Grand Final ===
- Devonport Power 9.16 (70) v Glenorchy 6.11 (47) – North Hobart Oval

=== Leading Goalkickers: TFL Statewide League ===
- Byron Howard Jnr (Nth Hobart) – 70
- Ken Rainsford (Launceston) – 61
- Andrew Hering (Burnie Dockers) – 49
- Jason Gibson (Nth Launceston) – 44

=== Medal Winners ===
- Fabian Carelli (Devonport Power) – William Leitch Medal
- Danny Noonan (Clarence) – Darrel Baldock Medal (Best player in TFL Grand Final)
- Paul Hamilton (Glenorchy) – TFL Coaches Award
- Ted Davis (Nth Launceston) & Brett Smith (Devonport Power) – George Watt Medal (Reserves)
- David Kamaric (Glenorchy) – V.A Geard Medal (Under-19's)

=== Interstate Matches ===
Interstate Match (Saturday, 21 June 1997)

- Tasmania 19.6 (120) v Westar Rules 10.13 (73) – Att: 3,490 at North Hobart Oval

== 1997 TFL Statewide League Ladder ==
Pos	Team	Pld	W	L	D	PF	PA	PP	Pts
1	Burnie Dockers	18	16	2	0	2108	1065	197.9	64
2	Clarence	18	15	3	0	2186	1273	171.7	60
3	Devonport Power	18	14	4	0	1932	1240	155.8	56
4	Glenorchy	18	13	5	0	1811	1242	145.8	52
5	New Norfolk	18	11	7	0	1741	1427	122.0	44
6	North Launceston	18	7	11	0	1752	1507	116.3	28
7	South Launceston	18	7	11	0	1206	1559	77.4	28
8	North Hobart	18	6	12	0	1482	1641	90.3	24
9	Launceston	18	5	13	0	1426	1907	74.8	20
10	Sandy Bay	18	5	13	0	1266	1833	69.1	20
11	Hobart	18	0	18	0	720	2918	24.7	0

=== Round 1 ===
(Saturday, 12 April 1997)

- New Norfolk 15.12 (102) v Sandy Bay 10.7 (67) – Att: 1,082 at North Hobart Oval
- Glenorchy 14.15 (99) v Nth Hobart 7.8 (50) – Att: 1,392 at KGV Football Park
- Clarence 19.19 (133) v Devonport Power 8.4 (52) – Att: 928 at Bellerive Oval
- Sth Launceston 19.22 (136) v Hobart 3.2 (20) – Att: 562 at York Park
- Burnie Dockers 16.8 (104) v Nth Launceston 15.13 (103) – Att: 2,876 at West Park Oval
- Bye: Launceston.

=== Round 2 ===
(Saturday, 19 April & Sunday, 20 April 1997)

- Nth Hobart 11.12 (78) v Sth Launceston 9.8 (62) – Att: 839 at North Hobart Oval
- Burnie Dockers 12.7 (79) v New Norfolk 8.7 (55) – Att: 1,098 at Boyer Oval
- Glenorchy 10.12 (72) v Nth Launceston 10.11 (71) – Att: 903 at York Park
- Devonport Power 19.13 (127) v Launceston 11.12 (78) – Att: 1,047 at Devonport Oval
- Sandy Bay 29.14 (188) v Hobart 5.7 (37) – Att: 994 at Queenborough Oval (Sunday)
- Bye: Clarence.

=== Round 3 ===
(Saturday, 26 April 1997)

- Clarence 18.8 (116) v Nth Hobart 14.16 (100) – Att: 1,450 at North Hobart Oval
- Glenorchy 21.30 (156) v Hobart 6.3 (39) – Att: 899 at KGV Football Park
- New Norfolk 17.15 (117) v Launceston 10.11 (71) – Att: 605 at York Park
- Devonport Power 17.17 (119) v Sth Launceston 4.6 (30) – Att: 765 at Youngtown Memorial Ground
- Burnie Dockers 14.7 (91) v Sandy Bay 4.6 (30) – Att: 2,269 at West Park Oval (Night)
- Bye: Nth Launceston.

=== Round 4 ===
(Saturday, 3 May & Sunday, 4 May 1997)

- Launceston 27.18 (180) v Hobart 5.9 (39) – Att: 615 at North Hobart Oval
- New Norfolk 12.13 (85) v Glenorchy 12.11 (83) – Att: 1,478 at Boyer Oval
- Sth Launceston 10.6 (66) v Sandy Bay 5.5 (35) – Att: 442 at York Park
- Nth Launceston 16.7 (103) v Clarence 10.19 (79) – Att: 1,026 at Bellerive Oval (Sunday)
- Devonport Power 9.7 (61) v Burnie Dockers 6.11 (47) – Att: 1,842 at Devonport Oval (Sunday)
- Bye: Nth Hobart

=== Round 5 ===
(Saturday, 10 May & Sunday, 11 May 1997)

- New Norfolk 16.10 (106) v Nth Hobart 7.11 (53) – Att: 1,267 at North Hobart Oval
- Glenorchy 20.15 (135) v Sandy Bay 5.12 (42) – Att: 1,317 at KGV Football Park
- Nth Launceston 24.22 (166) v Hobart 6.3 (39) – Att: 648 at York Park
- Burnie Dockers 10.17 (77) v Clarence 9.13 (67) – Att: 2,071 at West Park Oval
- Launceston 18.9 (117) v Sth Launceston 8.9 (57) – Att: 832 at Windsor Park (Sunday)
- Bye: Devonport Power.

=== Round 6 ===
(Saturday, 17 May & Sunday, 18 May 1997)

- Nth Hobart 18.10 (118) v Sandy Bay 7.8 (50) – Att: 958 at North Hobart Oval
- Clarence 30.22 (202) v Hobart 2.8 (20) – Att: 738 at Bellerive Oval
- Glenorchy 13.22 (100) v Sth Launceston 5.10 (40) – Att: 601 at York Park
- Devonport Power 17.16 (118) v New Norfolk 8.13 (61) – Att: 1,434 at Devonport Oval
- Nth Launceston 21.11 (137) v Launceston 15.9 (99) – Att: 1,407 at Windsor Park (Sunday)
- Bye: Burnie Dockers

=== Round 7 ===
(Saturday, 24 May & Sunday, 25 May 1997)

- Devonport Power 11.18 (84) v Nth Hobart 12.10 (82) – Att: 947 at North Hobart Oval
- Nth Launceston 13.14 (92) v New Norfolk 10.7 (67) – Att: 939 at Boyer Oval
- Launceston 13.12 (90) v Sandy Bay 11.11 (77) – Att: 425 at York Park
- Burnie Dockers 20.14 (134) v Sth Launceston 8.4 (52) – Att: 1,635 at West Park Oval
- Glenorchy 15.14 (104) v Clarence 10.16 (76) – Att: 1,974 at KGV Football Park (Sunday)
- Bye: Hobart.

=== Round 8 ===
(Saturday, 31 May & Sunday, 1 June 1997)

- Launceston 13.11 (89) v Nth Hobart 8.17 (65) – Att: 884 at North Hobart Oval
- Clarence 22.16 (148) v Sandy Bay 8.6 (54) – Att: 884 at Queenborough Oval
- Burnie Dockers 21.12 (138) v Glenorchy 15.6 (96) – Att: 2,125 at West Park Oval
- New Norfolk 30.20 (200) v Hobart 4.7 (31) – Att: 863 at North Hobart Oval (Sunday)
- Devonport Power 12.15 (87) v Nth Launceston 12.11 (83) – Att: 1,545 at York Park (Sunday)
- Bye: Sth Launceston.

=== Round 9 ===
(Saturday, 7 June & Sunday, 8 June 1997)

- Nth Hobart 17.7 (109) v Nth Launceston 9.6 (60) – Att: 1,017 at North Hobart Oval
- New Norfolk 12.5 (77) v Sth Launceston 6.11 (47) – Att: 620 at York Park
- Devonport Power 19.18 (132) v Sandy Bay 8.8 (56) – Att: 1,244 at Devonport Oval
- Burnie Dockers 35.28 (238) v Hobart 0.1 (1) – Att: 618 at North Hobart Oval (Sunday)*
- Clarence 20.18 (138) v Launceston 11.15 (81) – Att: 712 at York Park (Sunday)
- Bye: Glenorchy.

Note: Burnie records the greatest margin of victory in TFL history of 237 points.

=== Round 10 ===
(Saturday, 14 June 1997)

- Devonport Power 30.22 (202) v Hobart 4.6 (30) – Att: 502 at North Hobart Oval
- Glenorchy 13.10 (88) v Launceston 10.12 (72) – Att: 804 at KGV Football Park
- Clarence 15.4 (94) v Sth Launceston 7.3 (45) – Att: 703 at Bellerive Oval
- Nth Launceston 17.14 (116) v Sandy Bay 6.8 (44) – Att: 566 at York Park
- Burnie Dockers 24.11 (155) v Nth Hobart 6.13 (49) – Att: 1,539 at West Park Oval
- Bye: New Norfolk.

=== Round 11 ===
(Saturday, 22 June 1997)

- Nth Hobart 20.13 (133) v Hobart 3.9 (27) – Att: 836 at North Hobart Oval
- Clarence 19.11 (125) v New Norfolk 10.11 (71) – Att: 1,218 at Bellerive Oval
- Burnie Dockers 18.21 (129) v Launceston 11.6 (72) – Att: 725 at Windsor Park
- Sth Launceston 14.4 (88) v Nth Launceston 9.7 (61) – Att: 1,303 at Youngtown Memorial Ground
- Devonport Power 13.17 (95) v Glenorchy 9.6 (60) – Att: 1,644 at Devonport Oval
- Bye: Sandy Bay.

=== Round 12 ===
(Saturday, 28 June & Sunday, 29 June 1997)

- Sth Launceston 14.12 (96) v Hobart 10.2 (62) – Att: 484 at North Hobart Oval
- Clarence 15.11 (101) v Devonport Power 11.9 (75) – Att: 1,749 at Bellerive Oval
- New Norfolk 19.11 (125) v Sandy Bay 11.4 (70) – Att: 768 at Boyer Oval
- Burnie Dockers 22.17 (149) v Nth Launceston 6.8 (44) – Att: 1,132 at York Park
- Glenorchy 19.16 (130) v Nth Hobart 14.8 (92) – Att: 1,585 at North Hobart Oval (Sunday)
- Bye: Launceston

=== Round 13 ===
(Saturday, 5 July & Sunday, 6 July 1997)

- Sandy Bay 10.13 (73) v Hobart 7.8 (50) – Att: 684 at North Hobart Oval
- Glenorchy 18.17 (125) v Nth Launceston 10.11 (71) – Att: 1,130 at KGV Football Park
- Sth Launceston 12.11 (83) v Nth Hobart 10.12 (72) – Att: 439 at Youngtown Memorial Ground
- Burnie Dockers 15.19 (109) v New Norfolk 4.5 (29) – Att: 1,740 at West Park Oval
- Devonport Power 18.21 (129) v Launceston 8.8 (56) – Att: 712 at York Park (Sunday)
- Bye: Clarence.

=== Round 14 ===
(Saturday, 12 July 1997)

- Glenorchy 19.26 (140) v Hobart 9.1 (55) – Att: 777 at North Hobart Oval
- Burnie Dockers 16.14 (110) v Sandy Bay 11.10 (76) – Att: 476 at Queenborough Oval
- Clarence 18.19 (127) v Nth Hobart 6.8 (44) – Att: 1,078 at Bellerive Oval
- New Norfolk 18.14 (122) v Launceston 10.8 (68) – Att: 771 at Boyer Oval
- Devonport Power 18.14 (122) v Sth Launceston 2.4 (16) – Att: 1,186 at Devonport Oval
- Bye: Nth Launceston.

=== Round 15 ===
(Saturday, 19 July & Sunday, 20 July 1997)

- Sandy Bay 17.10 (112) v Sth Launceston 10.16 (76) – Att: 631 at North Hobart Oval
- Launceston 16.11 (107) v Hobart 8.6 (54) – Att: 482 at Windsor Park
- Clarence 17.8 (110) v Nth Launceston 12.7 (79) – Att: 813 at York Park (Sunday)
- Burnie Dockers 12.10 (82) v Devonport Power 11.9 (75) – Att: 5,590 at West Park Oval (Sunday)
- Bye: Glenorchy, North Hobart & New Norfolk.

=== Round 16 ===
(Saturday, 26 July & Sunday, 27 July 1997)

- Nth Launceston 32.16 (208) v Hobart 6.9 (45) – Att: 505 at North Hobart Oval
- Clarence 21.15 (141) v Burnie Dockers 13.5 (83) – Att: 1,824 at Bellerive Oval
- New Norfolk 13.13 (91) v Nth Hobart 13.8 (86) – Att: 910 at Boyer Oval
- Sth Launceston 21.18 (144) v Launceston 3.5 (23) – Att: 657 at Youngtown Memorial Ground (Sunday)
- Glenorchy 21.13 (139) v Sandy Bay 5.8 (38) – Att: 1,333 at Queenborough Oval (Sunday) *
- Bye: Devonport Power.

Note: Final TFL match ever staged at Queenborough Oval.

=== Round 17 ===
(Saturday, 2 August & Sunday, 3 August 1997)

- Sandy Bay 10.11 (71) v Nth Hobart 10.6 (66) – Att: 927 at North Hobart Oval
- Glenorchy 15.8 (98) v Sth Launceston 6.12 (48) – Att: 843 at KGV Football Park
- Devonport Power 19.18 (132) v New Norfolk 13.8 (86) – Att: 773 at Boyer Oval
- Nth Launceston 19.16 (130) v Launceston 5.12 (42) – Att: 698 at York Park
- Clarence 26.28 (184) v Hobart 8.4 (52) – Att: 698 at North Hobart Oval (Sunday)
- Bye: Burnie Dockers.

=== Round 18 ===
(Saturday, 9 August 1997)

- Sandy Bay 14.18 (102) v Launceston 10.6 (66) – Att: 400 at North Hobart Oval
- Clarence 15.8 (98) v Glenorchy 9.17 (71) – Att: 2,537 at Bellerive Oval
- New Norfolk 13.9 (87) v Nth Launceston 13.8 (86) – Att: 1,026 at York Park
- Burnie Dockers 23.20 (158) v Sth Launceston 7.6 (48) – Att: 804 at Youngtown Memorial Ground
- Devonport Power 21.18 (144) v Nth Hobart 8.9 (57) – Att: 1,157 at Devonport Oval
- Bye: Hobart.

=== Round 19 ===
(Saturday, 16 August 1997)

- Burnie Dockers 9.15 (69) v Glenorchy 2.9 (21) – Att: 1,249 at KGV Football Park
- Clarence 23.18 (156) v Sandy Bay 11.14 (80) – Att: 1,222 at Bellerive Oval *
- New Norfolk 28.21 (189) v Hobart 4.5 (29) – Att: 713 at Boyer Oval
- Nth Hobart 16.11 (107) v Launceston 11.8 (74) – Att: 418 at Windsor Park
- Devonport Power 14.14 (98) v Nth Launceston 12.10 (82) – Att: 1,006 at Devonport Oval
- Bye: Sth Launceston.

Note: Sandy Bay Football Club's final match in its history.

=== Round 20 ===
(Saturday, 23 August 1997)

- Nth Hobart 18.12 (120) v Hobart 11.6 (72) – Att: 1,826 at North Hobart Oval *
- Glenorchy 14.10 (94) v Devonport Power 9.8 (62) – Att: 1,016 at KGV Football Park
- Clarence 12.9 (81) v New Norfolk 11.5 (71) – Att: 1,045 at Boyer Oval
- Sth Launceston 8.18 (66) v Nth Launceston 8.11 (59) – Att: 901 at York Park *
- Burnie Dockers 21.19 (145) v Launceston 6.8 (44) – Att: 1,091 at West Park Oval *
- Bye: Sandy Bay.

Note: Hobart, Launceston & Sth Launceston Football Club's all play their final TFL matches.
North Launceston play their final match as the Robins, the club becomes known as 'Northern Bombers' the following year.

=== Elimination Final ===
(Sunday, 31 August 1997)

- Glenorchy: 5.4 (34) | 12.4 (76) | 16.9 (105) | 22.11 (143)
- New Norfolk: 0.4 (4) | 3.5 (23) | 7.5 (47) | 12.9 (81)
- Attendance: 2,518 at North Hobart Oval

=== Qualifying Final ===
(Saturday, 30 August 1997)

- Clarence Roos: 2.2 (14) | 6.9 (45) | 11.12 (78) | 19.17 (131)
- Devonport Power: 3.3 (21) | 5.3 (33) | 7.4 (46) | 12.4 (76)
- Attendance: 1,931 at North Hobart Oval

=== First Semi Final ===
(Saturday, 6 September 1997)

- Glenorchy: 2.3 (15) | 5.4 (34) | 14.5 (89) | 22.9 (141)
- Devonport Power: 2.3 (15) | 3.7 (25) | 6.9 (45) | 7.11 (53)
- Attendance: 1,615 at Devonport Oval

=== Second Semi Final ===
(Sunday, 7 September 1997)

- Burnie Dockers: 3.0 (18) | 9.3 (57) | 10.3 (63) | 14.4 (88)
- Clarence: 0.4 (4) | 0.4 (4) | 2.8 (20) | 2.8 (20)
- Attendance: 1,010 at West Park Oval

=== Preliminary Final ===
(Sunday, 14 September 1997)

- Clarence: 5.4 (34) | 8.8 (56) | 11.10 (76) | 15.15 (105)
- Glenorchy: 1.2 (8) | 6.5 (41) | 7.7 (49) | 10.9 (69)
- Attendance: 3,593 at North Hobart Oval

=== Grand Final ===
(Saturday, 20 September 1997)

- Clarence: 8.1 (49) | 11.3 (69) | 19.6 (120) | 20.9 (129)
- Burnie Dockers: 3.1 (19) | 9.6 (60) | 11.9 (75) | 18.14 (122)
- Attendance: 9,053 at North Hobart Oval

Source: All scores and statistics courtesy of the Hobart Mercury, Launceston Examiner and North West Advocate publications.
