= Darren Walsh (footballer) =

Australian rules footballer

Personal information
- Born: 27 December 1984 (age 41)
- Original team: Sandringham Dragons
- Debut: 19 April 2003, Essendon vs. Western Bulldogs, at Docklands Stadium
- Height: 186 cm (6 ft 1 in)
- Weight: 74 kg (163 lb)

Playing career^{1}
Years	Club	Games (Goals)
2003	Essendon	2 (0)
- ^{1} Playing statistics correct to the end of 2003.

Darren Walsh (born 27 December 1984) is a former Australian rules footballer who played for Essendon in the Australian Football League (AFL).

He was drafted by the Essendon Football Club in the 2002 National draft at pick 27 in the second round. He played two games in his first season with Essendon but ended the season with glandular fever. Walsh was delisted after the 2004 season without having played another game.
